= List of songs recorded by Regine Velasquez =

List of songs recorded by performer

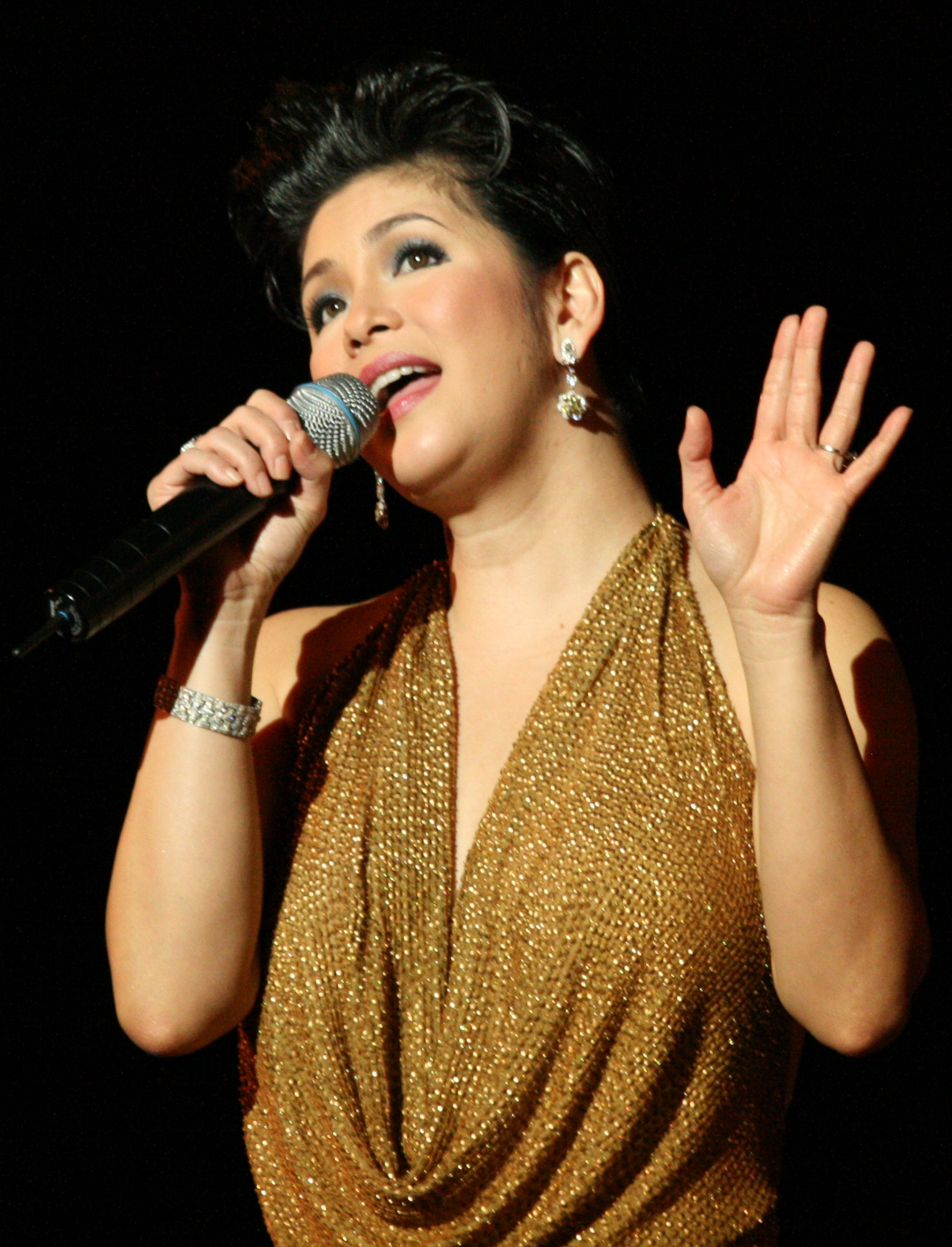
Velasquez performing at the Newark Symphony Hall in 2008

Filipino singer Regine Velasquez has recorded material for seventeen studio albums, eight soundtrack albums and five extended plays (EPs). She has also collaborated with other artists on duets and featured songs on their respective albums. After signing a record contract with Viva Records in 1987, Velasquez began to work with producers Vic del Rosario and Ronnie Henares, who co-produced all of the songs on her 1987 debut studio album Regine. Christine Bendebel wrote the tracks "Kung Maibabalik Ko Lang" and "Urong Sulong", while Awit Award-winning songwriter Vehnee Saturno co-wrote "Isang Lahi". Del Rosario and Henares also co-produced Velasquez's second studio album Nineteen 90 (1990); its lead single "Narito Ako" was written by Nonong Pedero and was originally recorded and performed by Maricris Belmont as an entry for the 1978 Metro Manila Popular Music Festival.

Tagala Talaga, Velasquez's third studio album, was released in October 1991 and featured cover versions of Filipino songs written by National Artist for Music recipients Ryan Cayabyab, Lucio San Pedro and Levi Celerio. The record's lead single "Buhay ng Buhay Ko" was written by Pedero and was originally recorded by Leah Navarro. Two more singles, "Anak" and "Sa Ugoy ng Duyan", were released in 1992 from Tagala Tagala. Velasquez released her fourth studio album Reason Enough in 1993. On it, she recorded a duet with Canadian singer Paul Anka for the record's first single "It's Hard to Say Goodbye", marking her first musical collaboration with an international artist. She also worked with Gary Valenciano, who co-wrote the album's second single "Sana Maulit Muli", which won the Awit Award for Best Performance by a Female Recording Artist in 1994.

After signing with PolyGram Records, Velasquez began working on her fifth studio album Listen Without Prejudice, which was released in 1994 and established her commercial music career in Southeast and East Asia. Different writers and producers, including Glenn Medeiros, John Laudon and Michael Au, significantly contributed to the album, writing and producing five songs among them. The critical and commercial success of Listen Without Prejudice was aided by the lead single "In Love with You", a duet recorded with Jacky Cheung. Velasquez subsequently released her sixth studio album My Love Emotion in 1995; Southern Sons' lead vocalist Phil Buckle wrote the album's title track. Velasquez also collaborated with Kazufumi Miyazawa and Mariya Takeuchi on three of the record's singles and recorded a cover version of British folk band Fairground Attraction's 1988 song "Perfect". The singer's seventh studio album Retro (1996) was aided by the release of several cover versions of international material, as well as of its lead single "Fly"—the only original song on the record. Maurice White, Al McKay and Allee Willis, members of the American disco-soul group Earth, Wind & Fire, are credited as songwriters due to the interpolation of the melody of their 1978 song "September". Velasquez's eight studio album Drawn (1998) marked her collaboration with executive producer Mark Feist, who also received songwriting and musical arrangement credits on the effort. In addition to Feist, Velasquez also worked with new songwriters, such as Charlotte Gibson and Shanice Wilson.

Velasquez's tenth studio album R2K was released in November 1999. A cover album, it contained the singles "I Don't Wanna Miss a Thing" (1998) by Aerosmith, "The Long and Winding Road" (1970) by the Beatles, "I'll Never Love This Way Again" (1979) by Dionne Warwick and "Music & Me" (1973) by Michael Jackson. The album has since been certified twelve times Platinum by the Philippine Association of the Record Industry (PARI). Following a two-year break, Velasquez released her eleventh studio album Reigne in 2001. She worked with producer Tats Faustino, who wrote "Dadalhin", and collaborated with singer Janno Gibbs for the ballad "Sa Aking Pag-iisa". The singer's succeeding records—Covers Volume 1 (2004), Covers Volume 2 (2006), Low Key (2008) and Fantasy (2010)—were cover albums. As executive producer of these albums, she enlisted longtime collaborators Jay Durias, Raul Mitra, and Gerard Salonga. In 2013, she released her sixteenth studio album Hulog Ka ng Langit, her first original material since Reigne. Its lead single was the title track of the album, and was followed by "Nathaniel (Gift of God)" and "Hele ni Inay". Velasquez's seventeenth studio album R3.0 was released in 2017; this triple CD set included the singles "Tadhana" and "Hugot". In addition to her music career, Velasquez has starred in films and recorded songs for her soundtrack albums. She further collaborated with Louie Ocampo on the songs "I Can" from Do Re Mi, and "You Are My Song" from Wanted Perfect Mother, while Ogie Alcasid wrote and produced several singles, including "Kailangan Ko'y Ikaw", "Pangako" and "Hanggang Ngayon".

== Songs ==
Key
†	Indicates single release
#	Indicates promotional single release
‡	Indicates live recording release

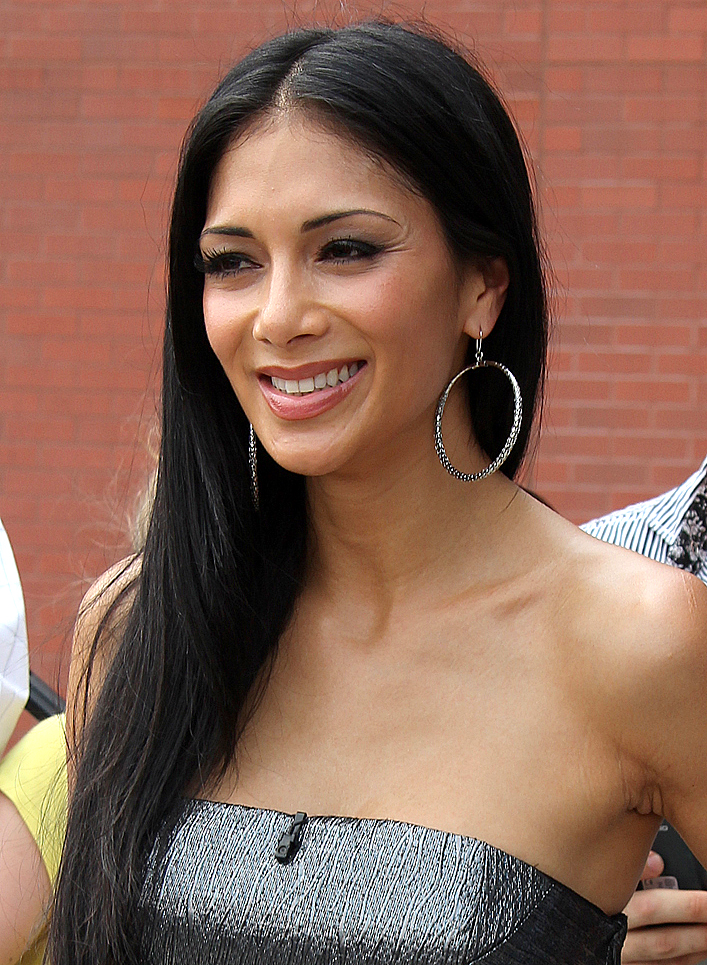
The Pussycat Dolls lead singer Nicole Scherzinger and Velasquez recorded a cover of "Nandito Ako".

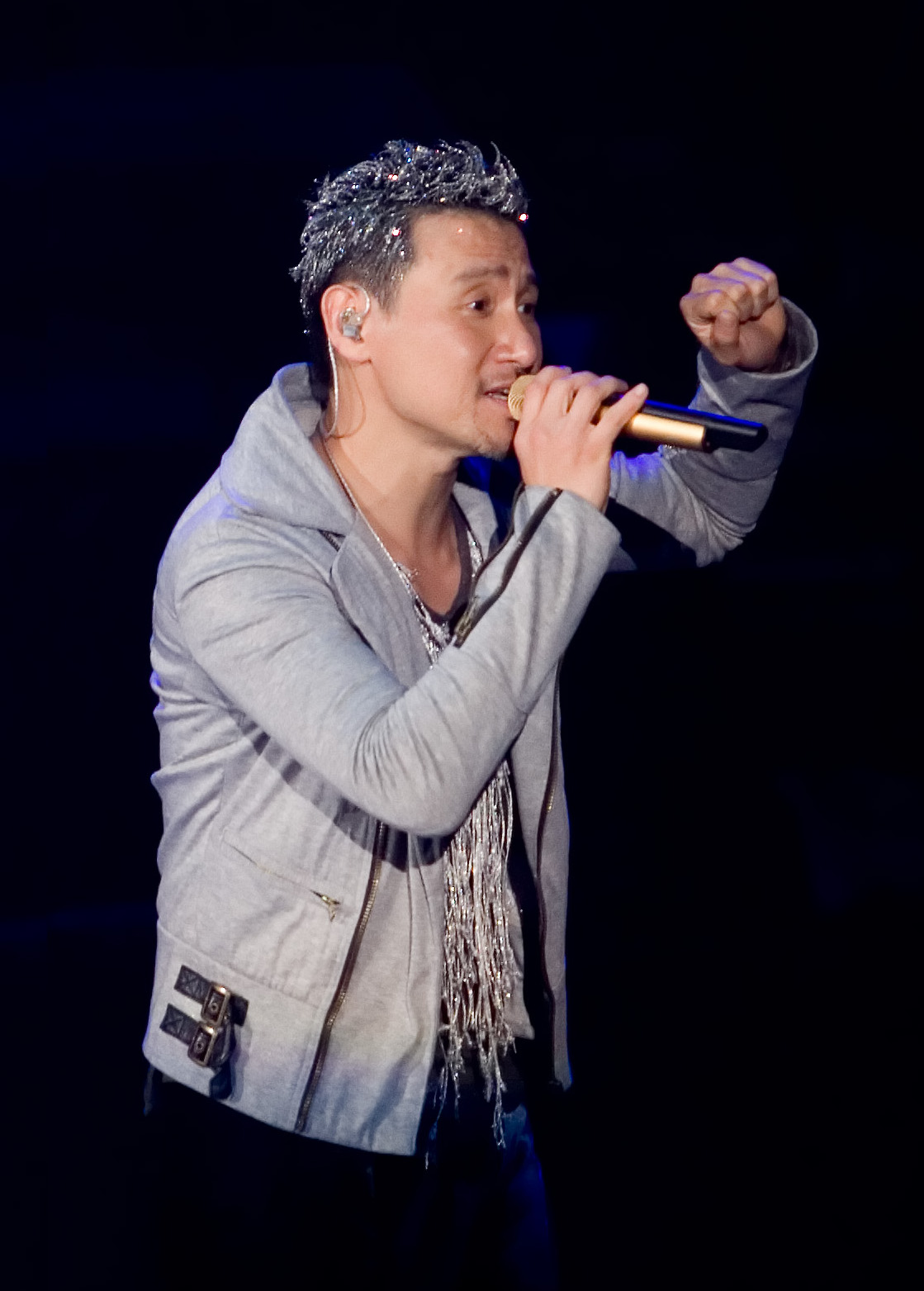
Velasquez collaborated with Jacky Cheung on the song "In Love with You".

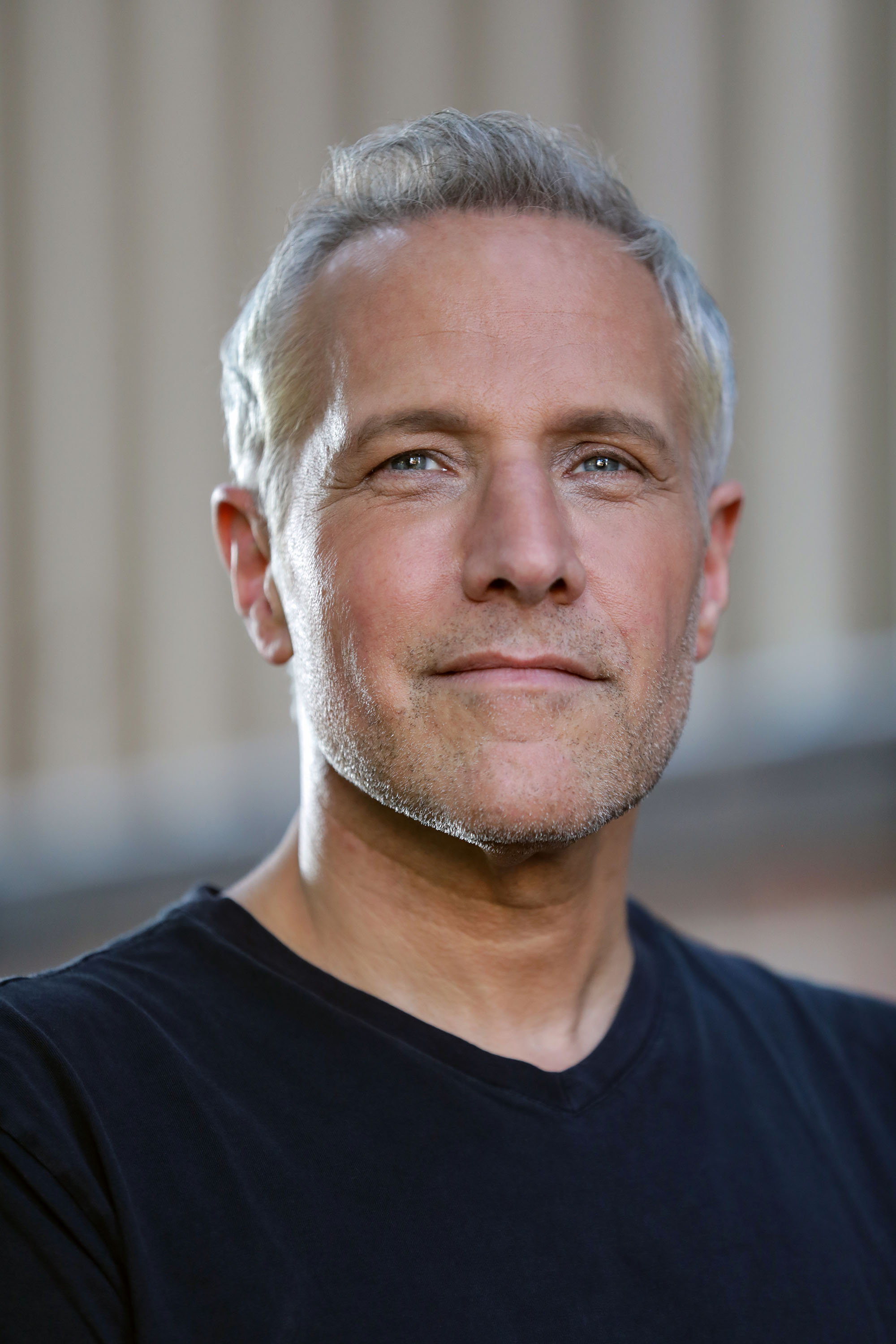
Jim Brickman is featured in Velasquez's cover of his song "Christmas Is" from Low Key.

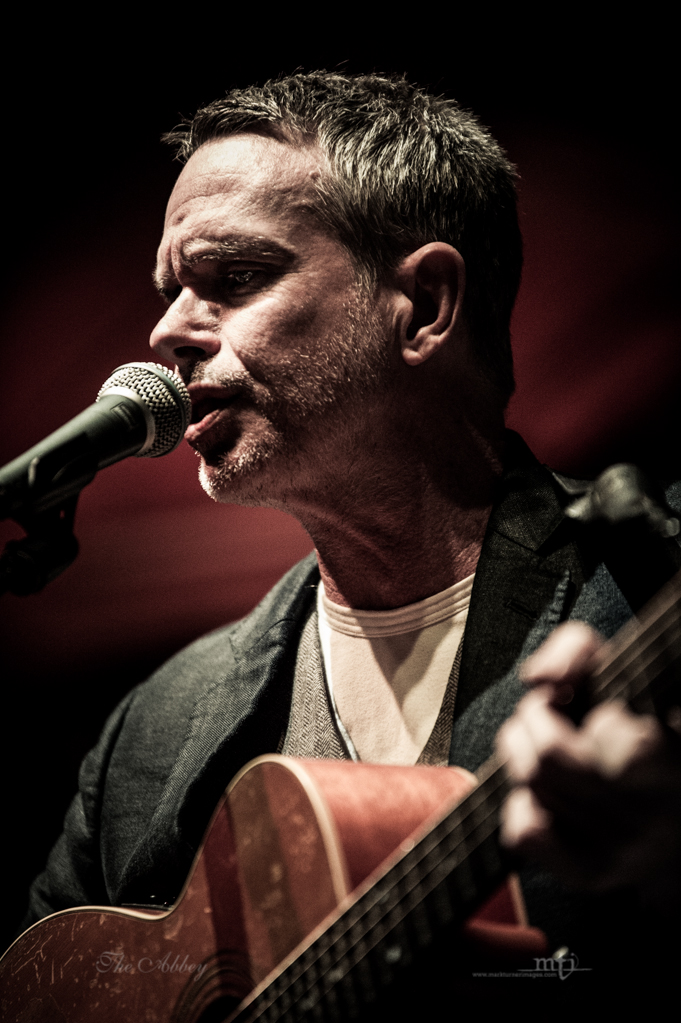
Rick Price re-recorded his single "Nothing Can Stop Us Now" as a duet with Velasquez.

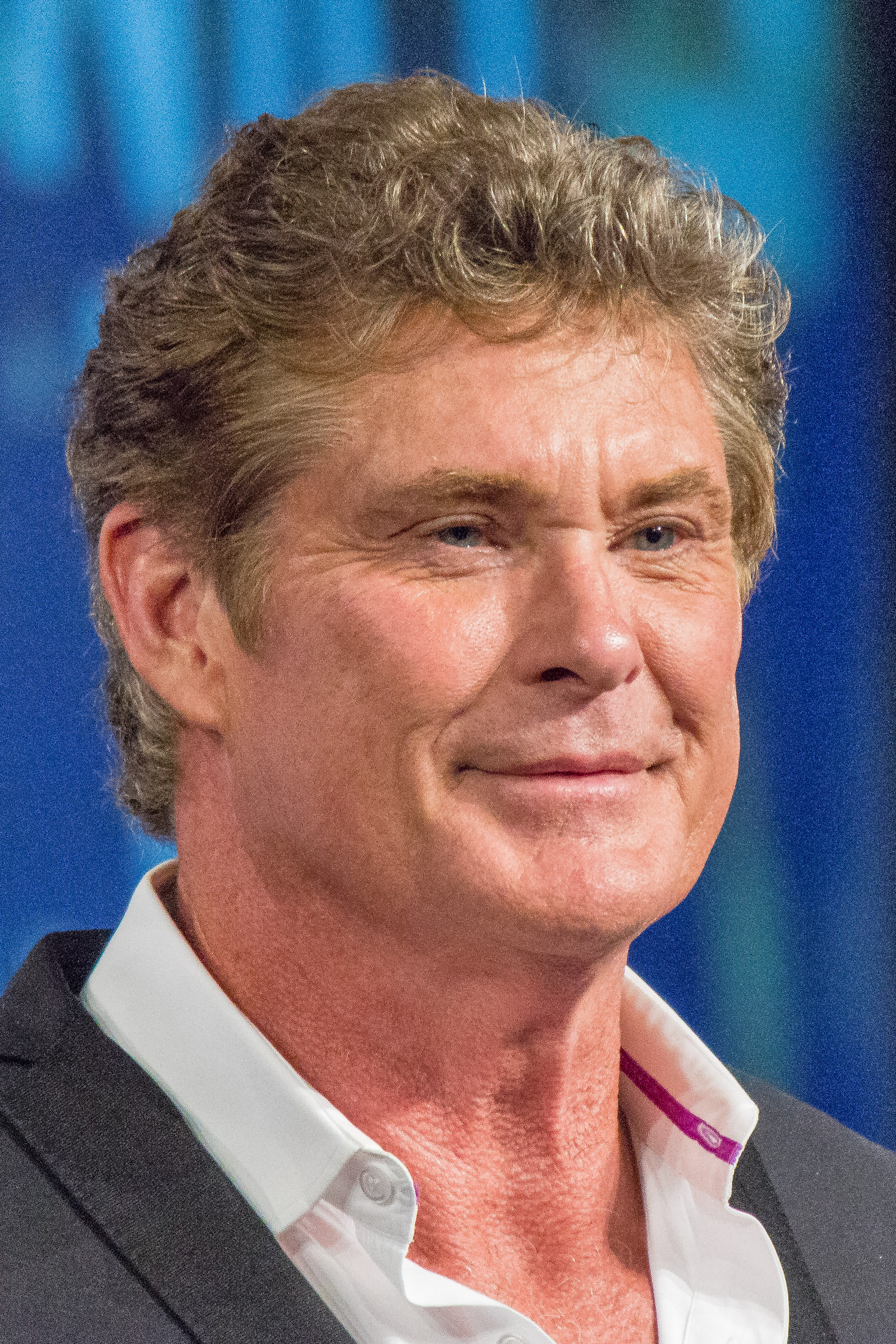
David Hasselhoff and Velasquez recorded "More Than Words Can Say" for the soundtrack of his film Legacy.

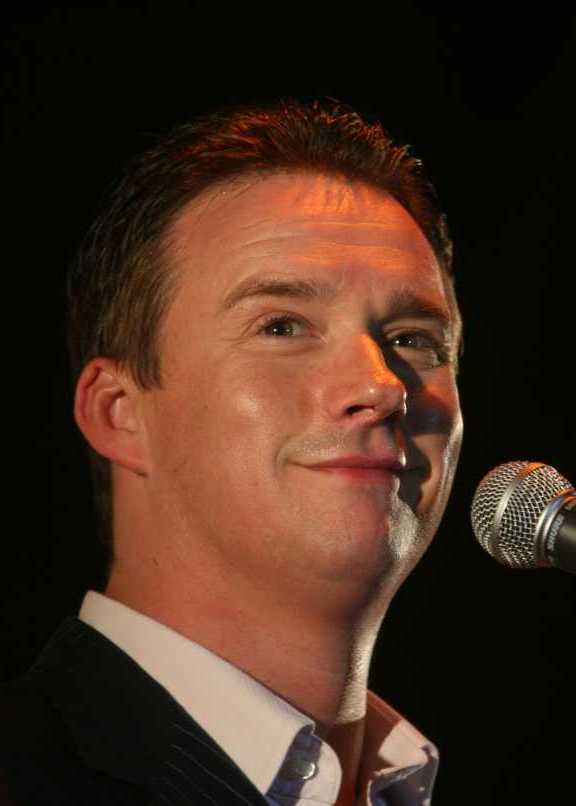
Velasquez is featured on Russell Watson's song "Live With Somebody You Love".

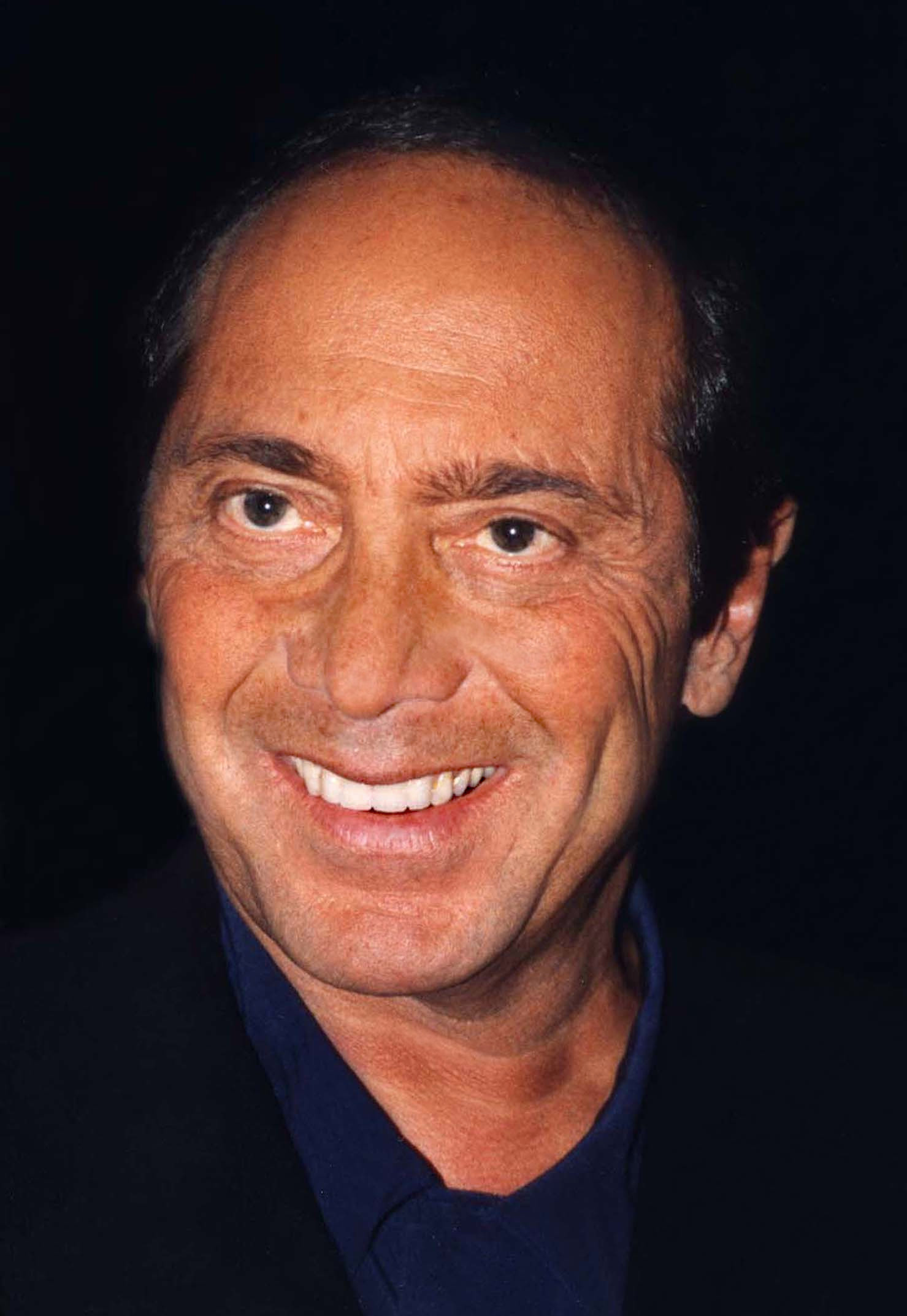
Paul Anka and Velasquez recorded a cover of "It's Hard to Say Goodbye".

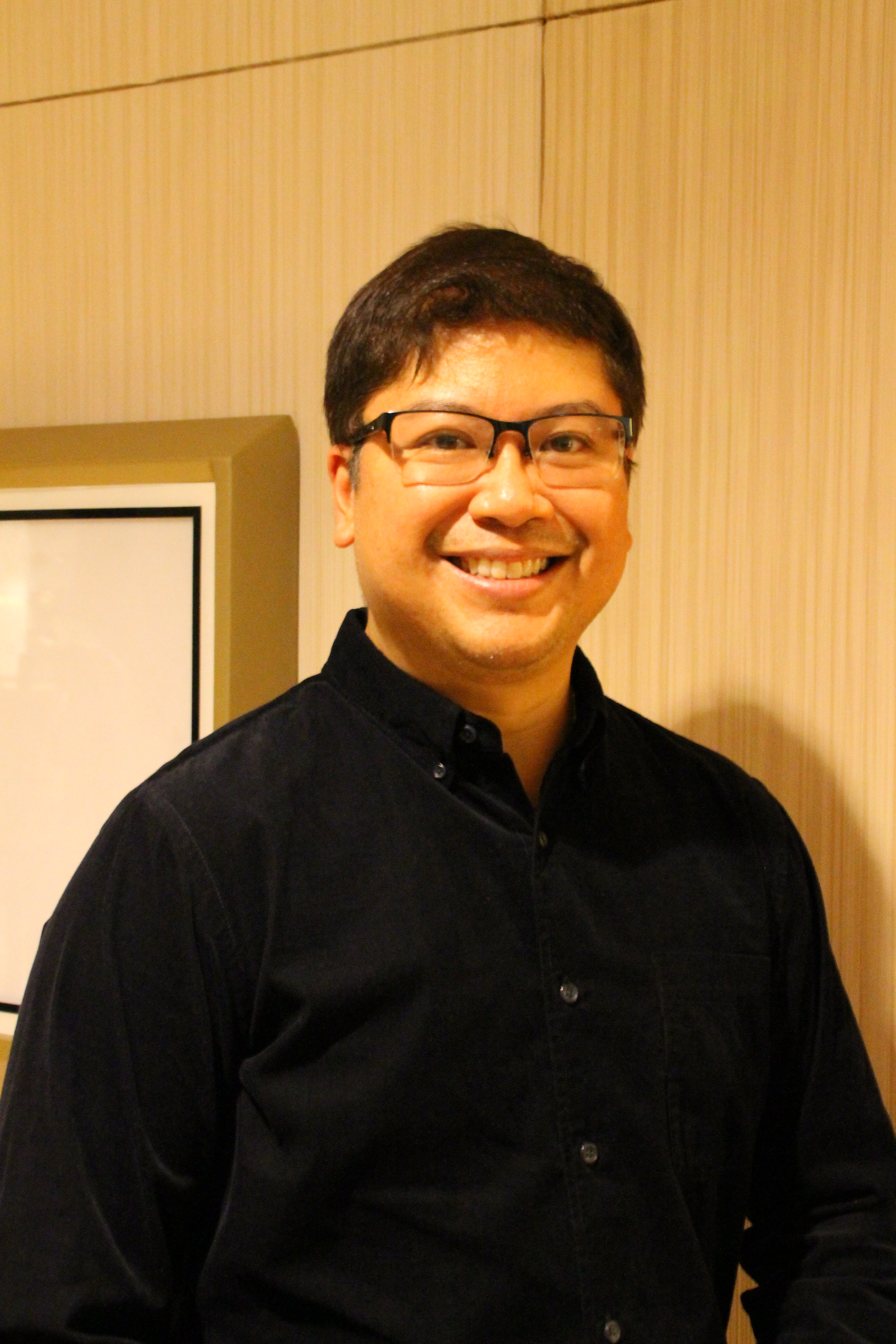
Gerard Salonga served as musical director for Regine Live: Songbird Sings the Classics and is featured in "With You I'm Born Again".

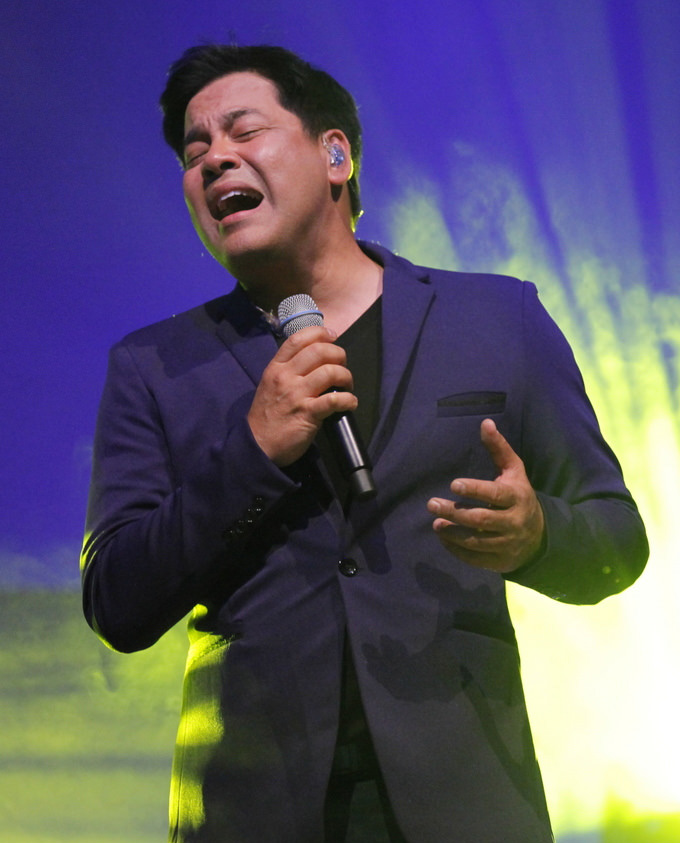
Martin Nievera co-wrote and features in the song "Forever". He also worked with Velasquez on "You Are My Song" and "Goodbye".

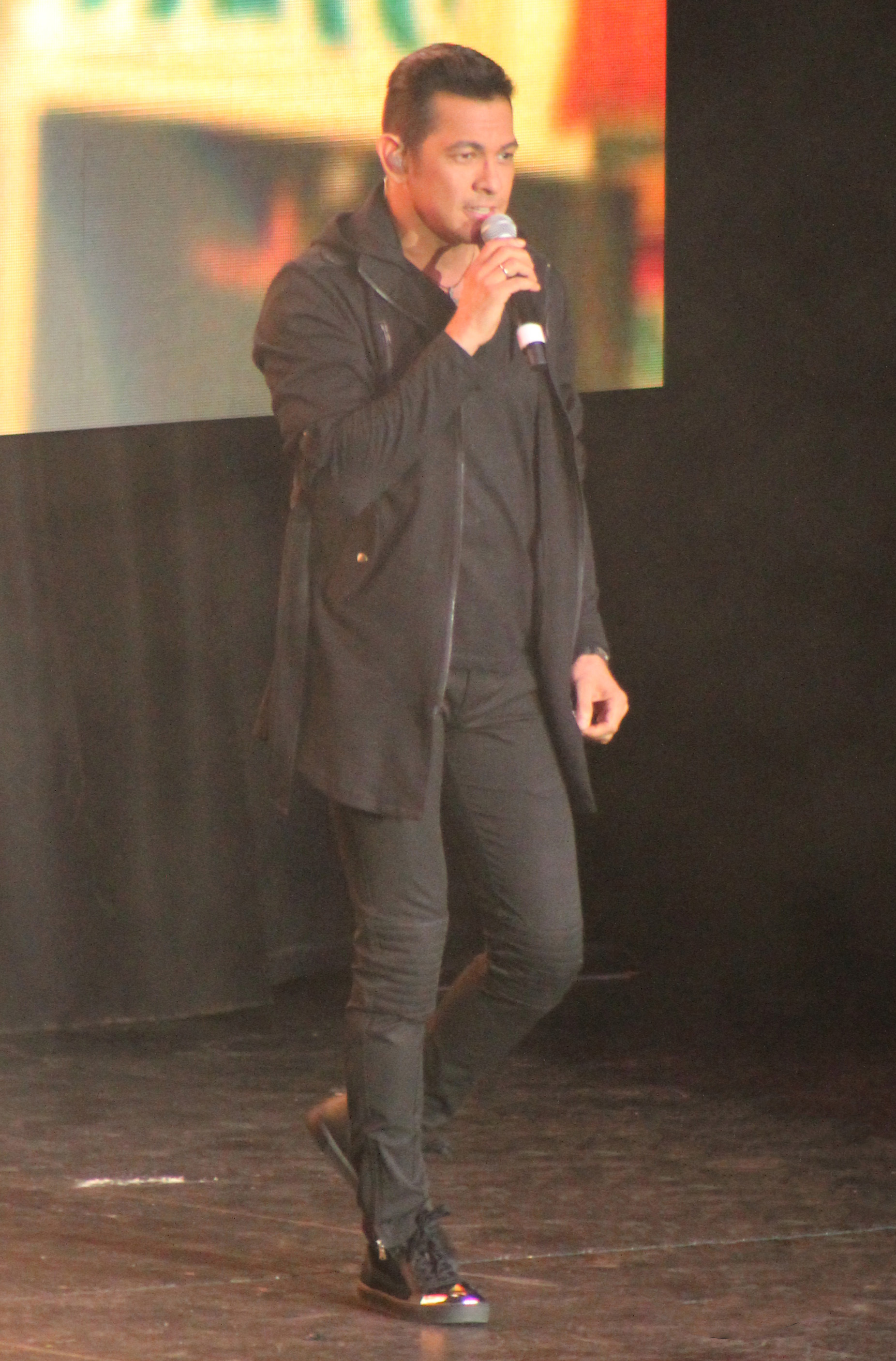
Gary Valenciano co-wrote "Sana Maulit Muli", while Velasquez provided guest vocals for Valenciano's "Each Passing Night" and "Muli".

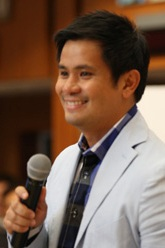
Velasquez's husband, Ogie Alcasid, wrote and produced a large majority of her songs for her films' soundtrack albums.

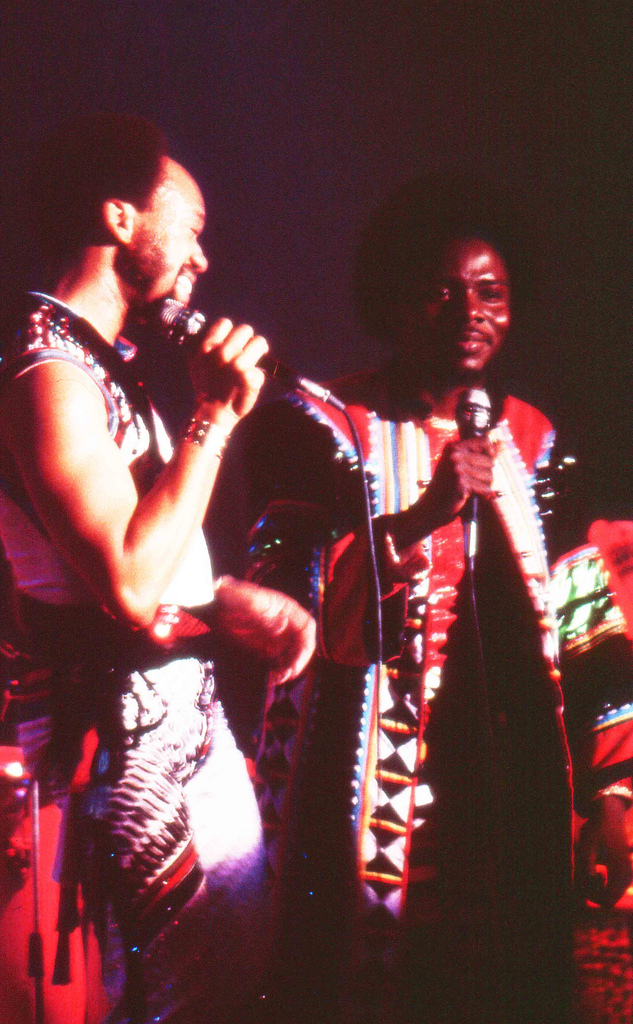
"Fly" interpolates Earth, Wind & Fire's song "September". Due to the interpolation, Maurice White, Al McKay and Allee Willis received co-writing credits.

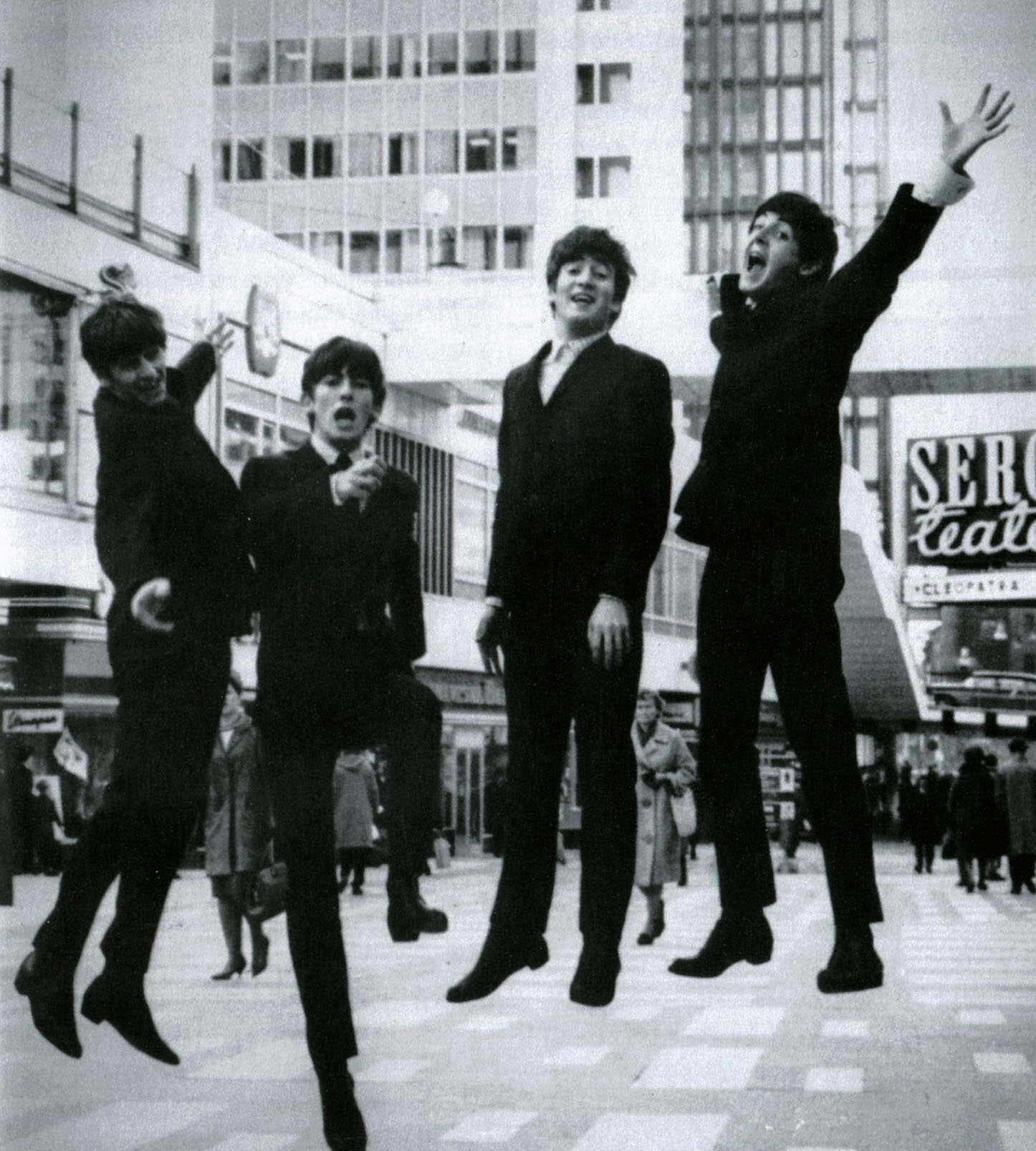
Velasquez has covered the Beatles' "Come Together", "Strawberry Fields Forever" and "The Long and Winding Road".

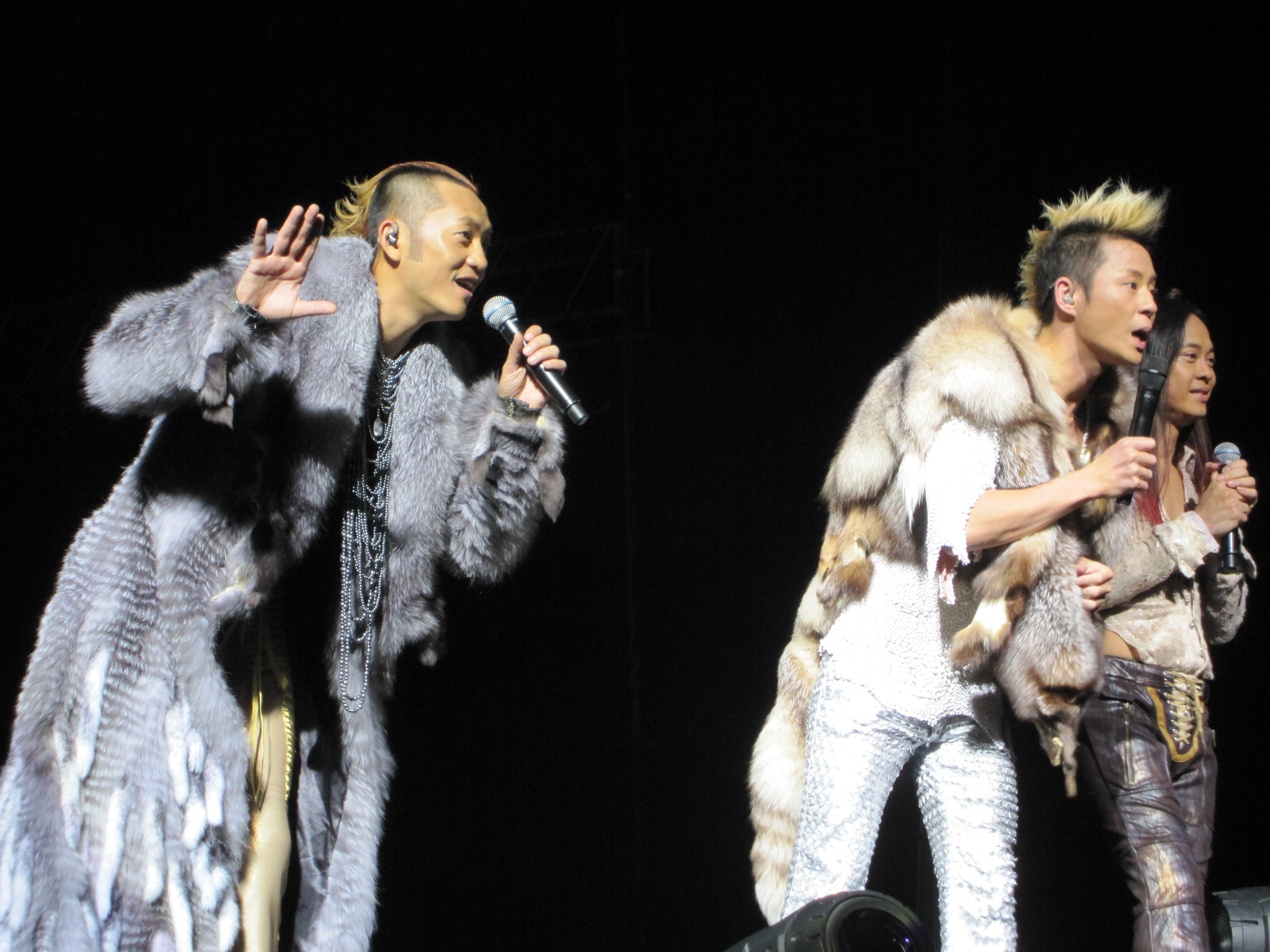
Remus Choy (pictured, center) and Velasquez recorded a cover of Andy Gibb and Olivia Newton-John's "I Can't Help It".

Name of song, credited artist(s), writer(s), originating album, and year of release
Song	Artist(s)	Writer(s)	Album	Year	Ref.
"Ako'y Iyong-iyo"	Regine Velasquez	Ogie Alcasid	Covers Volume 1	2004	
"Ako'y Sayo" #	Regine Velasquez	Ogie Alcasid	None (Note: Velasquez recorded "Ako'y Sayo" as the main theme song for the television series Totoy Bato in 2008.)	2008	
"Alipin" †	Regine Velasquez	Sam Santos	Till I Met You	2006	
"All My Life"	Regine Velasquez	Gerry Beckley	Fantasy	2010	
"Always"	Regine Velasquez (featuring Jay Perillo)	Monet Silvestre	Fantasy	2010	
"Amazing"	Regine Velasquez	Christopher Paul Janz	Hulog Ka ng Langit	2013	
"Anak" †	Regine Velasquez	Freddie Aguilar	Tagala Talaga	1991	
"And I Am Telling You (I'm Not Going)"	Regine Velasquez	Tom Eyen; Henry Krieger	Regine: Special Edition	1989	
"And I Love You So" †	Regine Velasquez	Don McLean	Low Key	2008	
"Ang Aking Awitin"	Regine Velasquez (featuring Jay Durias)	Edgardo Guerrero; Randy Ray	Covers Volume 1	2004	
"Araw, Ulap, Langit"	Regine Velasquez	Marlon Barnuevo	Hulog Ka ng Langit	2013	
"Araw-gabi" †	Regine Velasquez	Ryan Cayabyab	Covers Volume 1	2004	
"At Seventeen"	Regine Velasquez	Janis Ian	Low Key	2008	
"Autumn Leaves" ‡	Regine Velasquez	John Mercer; Jacques Anne Prevert	Regine Live: Songbird Sings the Classics	2000	
"Babae Ako" †	Regine Velasquez	Ogie Alcasid	Urduja	2008	
"Babalikang Muli"	Regine Velasquez	Larry Chua; Kenjiro Sakiya	Reason Enough	1993	
"Bakit Ako Mahihiya"	Regine Velasquez	Pablo Vergara	R3.0	2017	
"Bakit Ba Iniibig Ka" †	Erik Santos and Regine Velasquez	Ogie Alcasid	Loving You Now	2006	
"Barry Manilow Medley" ‡ (Note: Velasquez performs portions of "Could It Be Magic", "Weekend In New England", "Even Now" and "If I Should Love Again".)	Regine Velasquez	Adrienne Anderson; Randy Edelman; Barry Manilow; Martin Panzer	Regine Live: Songbird Sings the Classics	2000	
"Basil Valdez Medley" ‡ (Note: Velasquez performs portions of "Ngayon at Kailanman", "Iduyan Mo", "Kailan", "Hanggang sa Dulo ng Walang Hanggan" and "Kastilyong Buhangin".)	Regine Velasquez	Fred Areza; Ryan Cayabyab; George Canseco	Regine Live: Songbird Sings the Classics	2000	
"Been Waiting" †	Regine Velasquez	Francis Salazar	Fantasy	2010	
"Believe It" †	Regine Velasquez	Marita Manuel	Songs from Adarna: The Mythical Bird	1997	
"Bitaw" †	Poppert Bernadas and Regine Velasquez	Poppert Bernadas; Jesper Mercado	None (Note: "Bitaw" was digitally released as a non-album single in 2023.)	2023	
"Blue Suede Shoes"	Regine Velasquez	Carl Perkins	Covers Volume 2	2006	
"Bluer Than Blue" †	Regine Velasquez	Randy Goodrum; Bernice Parks	Retro	1996	
"Breaking Up Is Had to Do" ‡	Regine Velasquez	Ruth Bourne; Bede Cornstein	Regine Live: Songbird Sings the Classics	2000	
"Buhay ng Buhay Ko" †	Regine Velasquez	Nonong Pedero	Tagala Talaga	1991	
"Bukan Salah Cinta"	Sheila Majid and Regine Velasquez	Arnel de Pano; Trisno Asyraf Zainal Abidin	None (Note: "Bukan Salah Cinta" was originally released as a non-album single in 2010.)	2010	
"Bukas Sana"	Regine Velasquez	Mario Borja; Raymund Marcaida	Reigne	2001	
"Call Me"	Regine Velasquez	Debbie Harry; Giorgio Moroder	Covers Volume 2	2006	
"Can't Stop Thinking About Love"	Regine Velasquez	Gino Cruz	My Love Emotion	1995	
"Can't Take My Eyes Off You"	Regine Velasquez	Bob Crewe; Bob Gaudio	Pangarap Ko ang Ibigin Ka	2003	
"Christmas Is"	Regine Velasquez	Jim Brickman; Reggie Hamm; Mark Quinn Harris	Low Key	2008	
"Christmas Wish"	Regine Velasquez	Jay Montelibano	Love Was Born on Christmas Day	1996	
"The Closer I Get to You"	Norman Brown and Regine Velasquez	Reggie Lucas; James Mtume	Better Days Ahead	1996	
"Clouds Across the Moon"	Regine Velasquez	Richard Hewson	Low Key	2008	
"Color My World"	Regine Velasquez	Louie Ocampo; Nori Villena	Wanted: Perfect Mother	1996	
"Come Together"	Regine Velasquez	John Lennon; Paul McCartney	Covers Volume 2	2006	
"Could It Be"	Regine Velasquez	Lisa Dy; Chat Zamora	Reigne	2001	
"Cradle Me This Christmas"	Regine Velasquez	Lisa Diy	Love Was Born on Christmas Day	1996	
"Dadalhin" †	Regine Velasquez	Tats Faustino	Reigne	2001	
"Damdamin Ko Sa'yo"	Regine Velasquez	Vehnee Saturno	Reason Enough	1993	
"Dance with Me"	Regine Velasquez (featuring Teresita Velasquez)	John Hall; Johanna Hall	Retro	1996	
"Dancing Queen"	Regine Velasquez	Benny Andersson; Björn Ulvaeus; Stig Anderson	R2K	1999	
"Days Like These"	Regine Velasquez	Louis Biancanello; Henry Garcia; David Harper	My Love Emotion	1995	
"Di Bale Na Lang"	Regine Velasquez (featuring Andrew E.)	Gary Valenciano	Covers Volume 1	2004	
"Di Ka Nag-iisa" #	Regine Velasquez	Bassilyo Ignacio; Sisa Jamito	None (Note: Velasquez recorded "Di Ka Nag-iisa" as the main theme song for the television series Ang Probinsyano in 2021.)	2017	
"Di Na Nag-iisa" # (Note: Velasquez earlier recorded "Di Na Nag-iisa" as the main theme song for the television series Darna in 2005.)	Regine Velasquez	Jay Durias	Till I Met You	2006	
"Don't Go" †	Regine Velasquez	Teresita Agbayani	Till I Met You	2006	
"Dream Away"	Regine Velasquez	Jimmy Antiporda	R3.0	2017	
"Dying"	Regine Velasquez	John Ondrasik	Fantasy	2010	
"Each Day with You"	Regine Velasquez	Franklink Kleiner; Benedict Say	Covers Volume 1	2004	
"Each Passing Night"	Gary Valenciano (featuring Regine Velasquez)	Larry Scott; Amarie Testa; Gary Valenciano	Faces of Love	1990	
"Ebb Tide"	Regine Velasquez	Robert Maxwell; Carl Sigman	Regine	1987	
"Emotion"	Regine Velasquez	Barry Gibb; Robin Gibb	Drawn	1998	
"Evergreen"	Janno Gibbs and Regine Velasquez	Phil Ramone; Barbra Streisand	Divas & I	2001	
"Everyday"	Regine Velasquez	Cacai Velasquez	Kailangan Ko'y Ikaw	2000	
"Eyes Only for Me"	Jay R and Regine Velasquez	Adam Pondang; Andrew Michael Briol; Daniel Skeete; Jayde; Jay R Regine Velesquez; Sammy Tetzba	None (Note: "Eyes Only for Me" was digitally released as a non-album single in 2024.)	2024	
"Fairy Tale"	Regine Velasquez	Noel Mendez	Fantasy	2010	
"Fallin'"	Regine Velasquez	Janno Gibbs	Till I Met You	2006	
"Fallin'" †	Regine Velasquez	Marvin Hamlisch; Carole Bayer Sager	R2K	1999	
"Falling in Love in a Coffee Shop"	Regine Velasquez	Landon Pigg	Fantasy	2010	
"Fantasy" #	Regine Velasquez	Gerard Kenny	Fantasy	2010	
"Fast"	Regine Velasquez	Trina Belamide; Mark Lopez	My Love Emotion	1995	
"First Man in My Life"	Regine Velasquez	Ogie Alcasid	R3.0	2017	
"The First Time Ever I Saw Your Face"	Regine Velasquez	Ewan MacColl	Kailangan Ko'y Ikaw	2000	
"Fly" †	Regine Velasquez	Jungee Marcelo; Maurice White; Al McKay; Allee Willis	Retro	1996	
"Follow the Sun" †	Regine Velasquez	Glenn Medeiros	Listen Without Prejudice	1994	
"For the Love of You" †	Regine Velasquez (featuring Gabby Eigenmann and KC Montero)	O'Kelly Isley Jr. Ronald Isley; Rudolph Isley; Chris Jasper	R2K	1999	
"Forever" †	Martin Nievera and Regine Velasquez	Martin Nievera; Louie Ocampo	Roads	1994	
"Forevermore" †	Regine Velasquez	Joey Benin	Covers Volume 1	2004	
"Free Spirits"	Regine Velasquez	Noel Mendez	Reigne	2001	
"The Funny One (Ogie's Theme)"	Regine Velasquez	Isabella Ledesma	Fantasy	2010	
"Giliw"	Regine Velasquez	Jim Paredes	Kailangan Ko'y Ikaw	2000	
"Go the Distance"	Regine Velasquez	Michael Bolton	R3.0	2017	
"God Gave Me You"	Regine Velasquez	Andy Goldmark; James Dean Hicks; Jamie Houston	Hulog Ka ng Langit	2013	
"Good Friend"	Regine Velasquez	Elmer Bernstein; Norman Gimble	Low Key	2008	
"Goodbye"	Regine Velasquez	Louie Ocampo; Martin Nievera	My Love Emotion	1995	
"The Greatest Love of All"	Regine Velasquez	Michael Masser; Linda Creed	R3.0	2017	
"Habang May Buhay" †	Jaya and Regine Velasquez	Freddie Aguilar	Five	2000	
"Hagkan"	Regine Velasquez	Rowena Arrieta; Louie Ocampo	Tagala Talaga	1991	
"Hang On"	Regine Velasquez	Tats Faustino	Covers Volume 1	2004	
"Hanggang sa Dulo ng Walang Hanggan"	Regine Velasquez	George Canseco	Kaibigan: A Troy Laureta OPM Collective, Vol. 1	2021	
"Hanggang Ngayon" †	Ogie Alcasid and Regine Velasquez	Ogie Alcasid	A Better Man	2001	
"Happiness"	Regine Velasquez	Clark Gesner	Hulog Ka ng Langit	2013	
"Harana"	Regine Velasquez	Eric Yaptangco	Pangarap Ko ang Ibigin Ka	2003	
"Head Over Feet"	Regine Velasquez	Glen Ballard; Alanis Morissette	Covers, Vol. 2	2006	
"Heal Our Land" #	Regine Velasquez	Robin Brooks; Tom Brooks	None (Note: "Heal Our Land" was digitally released as a non-album single in 2020.)	2020	
"Hele ni Inay" †	Regine Velasquez	Roy del Valle; Lisa Tayko	Hulog Ka ng Langit	2013	
"Hello Again"	Regine Velasquez	Neil Diamond; Alan Lindgren	R2K	1999	
"Henry Mancini Medley" ‡ (Note: Velasquez performs portions of "Moon River", "Two for the Road" and "Moment to Moment".)	Regine Velasquez	Henry Mancini; Leslie Bricus; John Mercer	Regine Live: Songbird Sings the Classics	2000	
"Higher"	Regine Velasquez	Lisa Aschman; Jimmy Borja; Deanna Loveland	R3.0	2017	
"Himig Pasko"	Regine Velasquez	S.Y. Ramos	Love Was Born on Christmas Day	1996	
"Hinahanap-Hanap Kita" †	Regine Velasquez	Ely Buendia	Pangarap Ko ang Ibigin Ka	2003	
"Hindi Ka Nag-iisa" #	Regine Velasquez	Ogie Alcasid	None (Note: Velasquez recorded "Hindi Ka Nag-iisa" as the campaign song for the 2010 presidential campaign of Benigno Aquino III.)	2010	
"Hindi Ko Na Kayang Masaktan Pa"	Ogie Alcasid and Regine Velasquez	Ogie Alcasid	Lumilipad	2006	
"Hindi Na, Ayoko Na"	Regine Velasquez	Mon Faustino	Nineteen 90	1989	
"Hold Me in Your Arms" †	Regine Velasquez	Jack Jones; Phil Buckle	Covers Volume 2	2006	
"Hold on to Your Dreams"	Regine Velasquez	Andrei Dionisio	Love Was Born on Christmas Day	1996	
"Holiday"	Regine Velasquez	Klaus Meine; Rudolf Schenker	R2K	1999	
"Hot Stuff"	Regine Velasquez	Pete Bellotte; Harold Faltermeyer; Keith Forsey	Retro	1996	
"How Can I Tell"	Regine Velasquez	Cat Stevens	Low Key	2008	
"How Could You Leave" †	Regine Velasquez	Mark J. Feist	Drawn	1998	
"Hugot" †	Regine Velasquez	Miguel Mendoza	R3.0	2017	
"Hulog Ka ng Langit" †	Regine Velasquez	Aaron Paul del Rosario	Hulog Ka ng Langit	2013	
"I Am Beautiful" #	Regine Velasquez	Abby Asistio	None (Note: Velasquez released "I Am Beautiful" as a promotional single for the 2019 campaign of Australian cosmetics brand BYS.)	2019	
"I Believe I Can Fly"	Ivy Violan and Regine Velasquez	R. Kelly	At the Movies	2001	
"I Can" †	Regine Velasquez, Donna Cruz and Mikee Cojuangco	Edith Gallardo; Louie Ocampo	Do Re Mi	1996	
"I Can't Help It" †	Regine Velasquez (featuring Remus Choy)	Barry Gibb	Retro	1996	
"I Don't Wanna Miss a Thing" †	Regine Velasquez	Dianne Warren	R2K	1999	
"I Dream of Christmas"	Regine Velasquez	Christine Bendebel	Love Was Born on Christmas Day	1996	
"I Go Crazy"	Regine Velasquez	Paul Davis	Fantasy	2010	
"I Have to Say Goodbye"	Regine Velasquez	Ogie Alcasid	Nineteen 90	1989	
"I Just Don't Want to Be Lonely" † (Note: Originally released in 1973 by Ronnie Dyson and titled "Just Don't Want to Be Lonely".)	Regine Velasquez	Vinnie Barrett; Bobby Eli; John Freeman	Retro	1996	
"I Know"	Regine Velasquez	Edith Gallardo; Babsie Molina	Reigne	2001	
"I Know You By Heart"	Regine Velasquez	Trina Belamide	None (Note: Velasquez recorded "I Know You By Heart" as a non-album single in 2000 and released digitally in 2020.)	2000	
"ILY"	Regine Velasquez and Ogie Alcasid	DJ M.O.D. Darren & Cashwell	None (Note: "ILY" was digitally released as a non-album single in 2022.)	2022	
"I Never Dreamed Someone Like You Could Love Someone Like Me"	Regine Velasquez	Pino Donaggio	Low Key	2008	
"I Want to Know What Love Is"	Regine Velasquez	Mick Jones	Retro	1996	
"I Would Die for You"	Regine Velasquez	Jann Arden	Listen Without Prejudice	1994	
"I'd Rather Leave While I'm in Love"	Regine Velasquez	Carole Bayer Sager; Peter Allen	Low Key	2008	
"Iduyan Mo"	Jose Llana and Regine Velasquez	Ryan Cayabyab	Jose Llana	2003	
"If Ever You're in My Arms Again"	Regine Velasquez	Cynthia Weil; Michael Masser; Tom Snow	R2K	1999	
"If You Go Away" ‡ (Note: Velasquez re-recorded "If You Go Away" for her studio album R3.0.)	Regine Velasquez	Jacques Brel; Rod McKuen	Regine Live: Songbird Sings the Classics	2000	
"Ikaw" †	Regine Velasquez	George Canseco; Louie Ocampo	Drawn	1998	
"Ikaw ang Aking Mahal" #	Regine Velasquez	Ogie Alcasid	None (Note: Velasquez recorded "Ikaw ang Aking Mahal" as the main theme song for the television series The General's Daughter in 2019.)	2019	
"Ikaw ang Lahat sa Akin"	Regine Velasquez	Cecile Azarcon	Covers Volume 1	2004	
"Ikaw Nga" #	Regine Velasquez	Jay Durias	None (Note: Velasquez recorded "Ikaw Nga" as the main theme song for the television series Mulawin vs. Ravena in 2017.)	2017	
"Ikaw sa Paskong Ito"	Regine Velasquez	Jondi Samson	Love Was Born on Christmas Day	1996	
"I'll Never Love This Way Again"	Regine Velasquez	Richard Kerr; Will Jennings	R2K	1999	
"I'm Lost in a Lonely Harmony"	Regine Velasquez	Romeo Diaz; H. Ebert	Listen Without Prejudice	1994	
"In Love with You" †	Regine Velasquez and Jacky Cheung	John Laudon	Listen Without Prejudice	1994	
"In Your Eyes" †	Regine Velasquez	Dan Hill; Michael Masser	R2K	1999	
"Ipinagpanata Kita" †	Davey Langit (featuring Regine Velasquez)	Davey Langit; Therese Villarante	None (Note: "Ipinagpanata Kita" was digitally released as a non-album single in 2021.)	2021	
"Is This Feeling for Real"	Regine Velasquez	Mark Heimermann; David Mullen	Reason Enough	1993	
"Isang Lahi" †	Regine Velasquez	Vehnee Saturno; Freddie Saturno	Regine	1987	
"Istorya" †	Regine Velasquez	Carl Guevarra	None (Note: "Istorya" was digitally released as a non-album single in 2019.)	2020	
"It Must Have Been Love" †	Regine Velasquez	Per Gessle	Reginified	2023	
"It Doesn't Get Better Than This"	Regine Velasquez	Trina Belamide	MTV Fabulous Divas	2001	
"It's Hard to Say Goodbye" †	Regine Velasquez and Paul Anka	Jack White; Mark Spiro	Reason Enough	1993	
"Itutuloy"	Regine Velasquez	Edith Gallardo; Moy Ortiz	Pangako Ikaw Lang	2001	
"Just Like Before"	Gabby Eigenmann and Regine Velasquez	Tats Faustino	Loving	2001	
"Just the Way You Are"	Regine Velasquez and Ogie Alcasid	Bruno Mars; Philip Lawrence; Ari Levine; Khalil Walton; Khari Cain	Hulog Ka ng Langit	2013	
"Kahit Ika'y Panaginip Lang"	Regine Velasquez	Ryan Cayabyab	Tagala Talaga	1991	
"Kailan"	Regine Velasquez	Fred Areza	Covers Volume 1	2004	
"Kailangan Kita" #	Regine Velasquez	Ogie Alcasid	None (Note: Velasquez recorded "Kailangan Kita" as the main theme song for the television series La Vida Lena in 2021.)	2021	
"Kailangan Ko, Kailangan Mo"	Martin Nievera and Regine Velasquez	Gerry Paraiso	Awit ng Puso	2006	
"Kailangan Ko'y Ikaw" † (Note: Velasquez performed "Kailangan Ko'y Ikaw" for her live album Regine Live: Songbird Sings the Classics.)	Regine Velasquez	Ogie Alcasid	Kailangan Ko'y Ikaw	2000	
"Kaligayahan"	Regine Velasquez	Trina Belamide	Kailangan Ko'y Ikaw	2000	
"Kastilyong Buhangin"	Regine Velasquez	George Canseco	Tagala Talaga	1991	
"Kiss"	Regine Velasquez	Prince Nelson	Covers Volume 2	2006	
"Kiss on My List"	Regine Velasquez	Janna Allen; Daryl Hall	Covers Volume 2	2006	
"Know It"	Regine Velasquez	Tats Faustino	Nineteen 90	1989	
"Kung Kailan Pa"	Regine Velasquez	Edith Gallardo; Babsie Molina,	Reason Enough	1993	
"Kung Maibabalik Ko Lang" †	Regine Velasquez	Christine Bendebel	Regine	1987	
"Lagi Kitang Naalala" ‡	Regine Velasquez	Levi Celerio	Lagi Kitang Mamahalin (A Musical Tribute To The National Artists)	2003	
"Langit"	Afterimage (featuring Regine Velasquez)	Wency Cornejo	Bagong Araw	1996	
"Leader of the Band"	Regine Velasquez	Dan Fogelberg	Low Key	2008	
"Learning from Love"	Regine Velasquez	Tegku Malinda; Younky Soewarno	My Love Emotion	1995	
"Let You Be"	Regine Velasquez	Toto Sorioso	Reigne	2001	
"Let's Stay Together"	Regine Velasquez	Al Green; Willie Mitchell; Al Jackson Jr.	Covers, Vol. 2	2006	
"Light in the Dark"	Regine Velasquez	Marissa Bunag; Juan Miguel Salvador	Regine	1987	
"Linlangin Mo"	Regine Velasquez	Raul Mitra; Cacai Velasquez	Drawn	1998	
"Lipad ng Pangarap" (Note: Velasquez re-recorded "Lipad Ng Pangarap" as the main theme song for the television series Pira-Pirasong Paraiso in 2023.)	Angeline Quinto and Regine Velasquez	Arnel de Pano	Fall in Love Again	2012	
"A Little Love Goes a Long Way"	Regine Velasquez, Donna Cruz and Mikee Cojuangco	Edith Gallardo; Mon Ortiz	Do Re Mi	1996	
"Live with Somebody You Love"	Russell Watson and Regine Velasquez	Alain Boublil; Claude-Michel Schönberg	Only One Man	2013	
"The Long and Winding Road"	Regine Velasquez	John Lennon; Paul McCartney	R2K	1999	
"Long For Him"	Regine Velasquez	Lisa Dy	Reigne	2001	
"Longer"	Regine Velasquez	Dan Fogelberg	Low Key	2008	
"Looking Through the Eyes of Love" (Note: Originally released in 1978 by Melissa Manchester and titled "Through the Eyes of Love".)	Regine Velasquez	Marvin Hamlisch; Carole Bayer Sager	Retro	1996	
"Lost Without Your Love" †	Regine Velasquez	David Gates	R2K	1999	
"Love Again"	Regine Velasquez	Mark J. Feist; Shanice Wilson	Drawn	1998	
"Love Is Stronger Far Than We"	Regine Velasquez	Pierre Barouh; Francis Lai; Jerry Keller	The Best of Crossover Presents	2003	
"Love Me Again" †	Regine Velasquez	Homer Flores	None (Note: "Love Me Again" was originally released as a non-album single in 1986.)	1986	
"Love on the Airwaves"	Regine Velasquez	Chris Hamlet Thompson; Robert Watson	Reigne	2001	
"Love Songs Medley" (Note: Velasquez recorded portions of "I'll Always Love You" by Michael Johnson, "Love Is All That Matters" by Eric Carmen, "Longer" by Dan Fogelberg and "More Than You'll Ever Know" by Michael Ruff.)	Regine Velasquez	Eric Kaz; Tom Snow; Eric Carmen; Dan Fogelberg; Michael Ruff	R2K	1999	
"Love Was Born on Christmas Day"	Regine Velasquez	Christine Bendebel	Love Was Born on Christmas Day	1996	
"Love Will Keep Us Alive"	Regine Velasquez	Jim Capaldi; Paul Carrack; Peter Vale	Fantasy	2010	
"Mac Arthur Park"	Regine Velasquez	Jimmy Webb	R2K	1999	
"Maghihintay Ako" #	Regine Velasquez	Chi Datu; Allan Feliciano; Jun Lana	None (Note: Velasquez recorded "Maghihintay Ako" as the main theme song for the television series Atlantika in 2006.)	2006	
"Maghihintay Ako sa Iyo"	Regine Velasquez	Louie Ocampo; Baby Gil	Tagala Talaga	1991	
"Magkasuyo Buong Gabi" †	Janno Gibbs and Regine Velasquez	B. Hart	Unang Sikat (Note: "Magkasuyo Buong Gabi" was originally released on various artists' compilation album Unang Sikat in 1992; it was included in Velasquez's compilation album Unsolo in 2000.)	1992	
"Mahal Ko o Mahal Ako" #	Regine Velasquez	Edwin Marollano	None (Note: Velasquez recorded "Mahal Ko o Mahal Ako" as the main theme song for the television series Love Thy Woman in 2020.)	2020	
"Mahal na Mahal Kita"	Regine Velasquez	Archie Dairocas	Covers Volume 1	2004	
"Makita Kang Muli"	Ebe Dancel and Regine Velasquez	Jimmy Antiporda; Cymbee Antiporda	Bawat Daan	2015	
"Mangarap Lang"	Regine Velasquez	Cacai Velasquez	Till I Met You	2006	
"Manhid"	Regine Velasquez	Isha Abubakar	Paano Kita Iibigin	2007	
"Matibay"	Jona Viray and Regine Velasquez	Kiko Salazar	Jona	2017	
"Maybe It's You" #	Regine Velasquez	Chi Datu; Allan Feliciano; Jun Lana	None (Note: Velasquez recorded "Maybe It's You" as the main theme song for the television series Ako si Kim Samsoon in 2008.)	2008	
"Maybe Next Year"†	Regine Velasquez	Dada de Pano	Love Was Born on Christmas Day	1996	
"Maybe Now, Maybe Then"	Regine Velasquez	Nina Puno	Regine	1987	
"Messin' in My Head"	Regine Velasquez	Mark J. Feist; Shanice Wilson	Drawn	1998	
"Minsan Lang Kitang Iibigin" †	Regine Velasquez	Aaron Paul del Rosario	Covers Volume 1	2004	
"The Moment You Were Mine"	Regine Velasquez	B. Nielsen Chapman; S. Dorff	Listen Without Prejudice	1994	
"More Than Words Can Say" †	David Hasselhoff and Regine Velasquez	David Hasselhoff; Wade Hubbard; Glenn Morrow	None (Note: Velasquez and Hasselhoff recorded "More Than Words Can Say" for the latter's film Legacy in 1998; it was included in Velasquez's compilation album Unsolo in 2000.)	1998	
"Muli" †	Gary Valenciano and Regine Velasquez	Gary Valenciano	Hataw Na	1993	
"Muling Magmamahal"	Regine Velasquez and Piolo Pascual	Jonathan Manalo; Cynthia Roque	Paano Kita Iibigin	2007	
"Music & Me"	Regine Velasquez	Jerry Marcellino; Mel Larson; Don Fenceton; Mike Cannon	R2K	1999	
"Music of Goodbye"	Regine Velasquez	Alan Bergman; Marilyn Bergman	R2K	1999	
"My Child"	Regine Velasquez	Aaron Paul del Rosario	Hulog Ka ng Langit	2013	
"My Destiny"	Regine Velasquez	Toto Sorioso	Reigne	2001	
"My Girl, My Woman, My Friend"	Christian Bautista and Regine Velasquez	Jose Mari Chan	Romance Revisited: The Love Songs of Jose Mari Chan	2009	
"My Grown Up Christmas List"	Jed Madela and Regine Velasquez	David Foster; Linda Thompson-Jenner; Amy Grant	The Voice of Christmas	2009	
"My Love Emotion" †	Regine Velasquez	Phil Buckle	My Love Emotion	1995	
"My Miracle" #	Regine Velasquez	Raul Mitra	Pinoy Pop Superstar	2005	
"My Sweet Home"	Regine Velasquez	Mariya Takeuchi; Tommy Snyder; Tatsushi Umeyaki	My Love Emotion	1995	
"My World with You"	Regine Velasquez and Piolo Pascual	Niño Regalado	Paano Kita Iibigin	2007	
"Nag-iisa Lang" †	Regine Velasquez	Jonathan Manalo; Robert Labayen	None (Note: "Nag-iisa Lang" was digitally released as a non-album single in 2023.)	2023	
"Nandito Ako"	Regine Velasquez and Nicole Scherzinger	Aaron Paul del Rosario	Giliw: A Troy Laureta OPM Collective, Vol. 2	2021	
"Nandiyan Palagi" #	Regine Velasquez	Kedy Sanchez	None (Note: Velasquez recorded "Nandiyan Palagi" as the main theme song for the television series Genesis in 2013.)	2013	
"Nang Makita Ka"	Regine Velasquez	Teresita Agbayani	Reigne	2001	
"Narito Ako" †	Regine Velasquez	Nonong Pedero	Nineteen 90	1990	
"Nasa Puso"	Regine Velasquez	Edith Gallardo; Moy Ortiz	Reigne	2001	
"Nathaniel (Gift of God)" †	Regine Velasquez	Jude Gitamondoc	Hulog Ka ng Langit	2013	
"Never Be the Same"	Regine Velasquez	Christopher Cross	Low Key	2008	
"Never Ever Say Goodbye"	Regine Velasquez	Willy Cruz	Drawn	1998	
"Never Give Up"	Regine Velasquez	Amy Holland; Jeff Day	Covers, Vol. 2	2006	
"Ngayong Wala Ka Na"	Regine Velasquez	Archie Castillo; Onie Zamora	Nineteen 90	1989	
"No Walls, No Ceilings, No Floors" †	Regine Velasquez	Hal David; Archie Jordan	Low Key	2008	
"Nothing Left for Me"	Regine Velasquez	Shunichi Tokura; Trina Belamide	Retro	1996	
"Nothing Can Stop Us Now" †	Rick Price and Regine Velasquez	Rick Price; Heather Field; Patrick Gleeson	None (Note: "Nothing Can Stop Us Now" was digitally released as a non-album single in 2019.)	2019	
"Oceans"	Regine Velasquez	Matt Crocker; Joel Houston; Salomon Lighthelm	R3.0	2017	
"Of All the Things"	Regine Velasquez	Dennis Lambert; Brian Potter	Low Key	2008	
"OK Lang Ako"	Regine Velasquez	Chito Miranda	Fantasy	2010	
"On the Radio"	Regine Velasquez	Donna Summer; Giorgio Moroder	Covers, Vol. 2	2006	
"On the Wings of Love" †	Regine Velasquez	Jeffrey Osborne; Peter Schless	R2K	1999	
"Once in a Lifetime Love"	Regine Velasquez	Mark J. Feist; Charlotte Gibson	Drawn	1998	
"One"	Ogie Alcasid (featuring Regine Velasquez, Lani Misalucha and Jaya)	Ogie Alcasid	A Better Man	2001	
"One Day I'll Fly Away"	Regine Velasquez	Will Jennings; Joe Sample	Till I Met You	2006	
"The One I Love"	Regine Velasquez	Christine Bendebel	Regine	1987	
"One Love" †	Regine Velasquez	John Bettis; Richard Carpenter	R2K	1999	
"The One Real Thing"	Regine Velasquez	Trina Belamide	Hulog Ka ng Langit	2013	
"Only You"	Regine Velasquez	Joey Benin	Covers Volume 1	2004	
"Our Love"	Regine Velasquez	Michael McDonald; David Pack; Ted Templeman	Drawn	1998	
"Paalam"	Regine Velasquez	Rowena Arieta; Louie Ocampo	Covers, Vol. 1	2004	
"Paano Kita Iibigin" †	Regine Velasquez	Ogie Alcasid	Paano Kita Iibigin	2007	
"Pag-Ibig"	Regine Velasquez	Danny Javier	Hulog Ka ng Langit	2013	
"Pagbigyang Muli" †	Erik Santos and Regine Velasquez	Jonathan Manalo	15	2018	
"Palad sa Puso Mo"	Regine Velasquez	Willy Cruz	Do Re Mi	1996	
"Pangako" †	Regine Velasquez	Ogie Alcasid	Pangako Ikaw Lang	2001	
"Pangarap Ko ang Ibigin Ka" †	Regine Velasquez	Ogie Alcasid	Pangarap Ko ang Ibigin Ka	2003	
"Pangarap Ko'y Ikaw" †	Regine Velasquez	Raul Mitra; Cacai Velasquez	Covers Volume 1	2004	
"Pangarap Na Bituin" #	Regine Velasquez	Willy Cruz	Star for a Night	2002	
"Pangarap sa Aking Puso"	Regine Velasquez	Lisa Dy; Chat Zamora	Wanted: Perfect Mother	1996	
"Papa Don't Preach"	Regine Velasquez	Brian Elliot; Madonna	Fantasy	2010	
"Pare Ko"	Regine Velasquez	Ely Buendia	Paano Kita Iibigin	2007	
"Payapang Daigdig"	Regine Velasquez	Felipe de Leon	Love Was Born on Christmas Day	1996	
"Perfect"	Regine Velasquez	Mark E. Nevin	My Love Emotion	1995	
"Perfect"	Regine Velasquez	Medwin Marfil	Covers, Vol. 1	2004	
"The Perfect Year"	Gary Valenciano and Regine Velasquez	Andrew Lloyd Webber; Don Black; Christopher Hampton	Outside Looking In	1995	
"Perry's Will"	Regine Velasquez	Jingle Buena; Arnold Reyes	Reigne	2001	
"Please Be Careful with My Heart" †	Jose Mari Chan and Regine Velasquez	Jose Mari Chan	Constant Change	1989	
"Points of View	Jaya and Regine Velasquez	Louie Ocampo	Cool Change	2007	
"Promdi"	Regine Velasquez	Jose Mari Chan; Tessie Tomas	Nineteen 90	1989	
"Prove to You"	Regine Velasquez	Ruth Anna Mendoza	R3.0	2017	
"Push Mo Yan Te!"	Vice Ganda (featuring Regine Velasquez)	Rox Santos	#Trending	2014	
"Rainbow Connection"	Regine Velasquez	Paul Williams; Kenneth Ascher	Hulog Ka ng Langit	2013	
"Reason Enough" †	Regine Velasquez	Trina Belamide	Reason Enough	1993	
"Remember This Christmas"	Regine Velasquez	Trina Belamide	Love Was Born on Christmas Day	1996	
"Run to You" ‡	Regine Velasquez	Jud Friedman; Allan Rich	Regine Live: Songbird Sings the Classics	2000	
"S.M.I.L.E."	Regine Velasquez	Noel Mendez	Fantasy	2010	
"Sa Aking Pag-iisa" †	Regine Velasquez	Janno Gibbs	Reigne	2001	
"Sa Duyan ng Pag-ibig"	Regine Velasquez	Willy Cruz	Tagala Talaga	1991	
"Sa Kanya"	Matteo Guidicelli and Regine Velasquez	Ogie Alcasid	Matteo Guidicelli	2015	
"Sa Piling Mo" †	Regine Velasquez	Ogie Alcasid	Mars Ravelo's Captain Barbell	2003	
"Sa Ugoy ng Duyan"	Regine Velasquez	Levi Celerio; Lucio San Pedro	Tagala Talaga	1991	
"Sa Wakas"	Regine Velasquez	Trina Belamide	Till I Met You	2006	
"Sa'yo Na Lang Ako"	Regine Velasquez	Lara Maigue	Hulog Ka ng Langit	2013	
"Sabihin Mo Lang"	Regine Velasquez	Trina Belamide	Kailangan Ko'y Ikaw	2000	
"Sana ay Malaman Mo"	Regine Velasquez	Louie Ocampo	Till I Met You	2006	
"Sana Nga"	Regine Velasquez	Edith Gallardo; Reggie Molina	Pangako Ikaw Lang	2001	
"Sana Nga"	Regine Velasquez	Trina Belamide	Paano Kita Iibigin	2007	
"Sana'y Laging Ganito"	Regine Velasquez	Edwin Marollano	Fantasy	2010	
"Sana Maulit Muli" †	Regine Velasquez	Angeli Pangilinan; Gary Valenciano	Reason Enough	1993	
"Sandcastle"	Regine Velasquez	Patty Mayoralago; Babsie Molina	Reigne	2001	
"Say Goodbye"	Regine Velasquez	Lara Maigue	R3.0	2017	
"Say That You Love Me" †	Regine Velasquez	Louie Ocampo; Allan Ayque	Covers Volume 1	2004	
"Search for a Star" #	Regine Velasquez	Raul Mitra; Cacai Velasquez	Search for a Star	2003	
"Say You Love Me"	Regine Velasquez	Patti Austin	Reason Enough	1993	
"Send Me Someone to Love"	Regine Velasquez	Curtis Mayfield; Mel Villena	My Love Emotion	1995	
"Shake Your Groove Thing"	Regine Velasquez	Dino Fekaris; Freddie Perren	Retro	1996	
"Sharing the Same Dreams"	Regine Velasquez, Donna Cruz and Mikee Cojuangco	Edith Gallardo; Mon Ortiz	Do Re Mi	1996	
"She's Always a Woman"	Regine Velasquez	Billy Joel	Low Key	2008	
"Shine" †	Regine Velasquez	Trina Belamide	Shine	2005	
"Silly Love Songs"	Regine Velasquez	Paul McCartney; Linda McCartney	Covers Volume 2	2006	
"A Single Soul"	Reuben Laurente and Regine Velasquez	Reuben Laurente; Markel Luna	Pop Virtuosity	2016	
"Skybound"	Regine Velasquez	Maniell Dulay	R3.0	2017	
"Slip Away"	Regine Velasquez (featuring Gary Valenciano)	Gino Cruz	Reason Enough	1993	
"Smile"	Regine Velasquez	Robin Nievera	Fantasy	2010	
"So Much in Love"	Regine Velasquez	Frank Musker; Dominic Bugati	Covers Volume 2	2006	
"Someone to Watch Over Me"	Regine Velasquez (featuring Robert Arevalo)	George Gershwin; Ira Gershwin	Pangako Ikaw Lang	2001	
"Someone's Waiting for You"	Regine Velasquez	Ayu Robbins; Carol Connors; Sammy Fain	Hulog Ka ng Langit	2013	
"Sometime, Somewhere" ‡ (Note: Velasquez re-recorded "Sometime, Somewhere" for her studio album R3.0.)	Regine Velasquez	Ryan Cayabyab	Regine Live: Songbird Sings the Classics	2000	
"Somewhere" ‡	Regine Velasquez	Leonard Bernstein; Stephen Sondheim	Regine Live: Songbird Sings the Classics	2000	
"Somewhere Over the Rainbow"	Jed Madela and Regine Velasquez	Harold Arlen; Yip Harburg	Iconic	2015	
"Songbird" ‡	Regine Velasquez	Dave Wolfert; Stephen Nelson	Regine Live: Songbird Sings the Classics	2000	
"Sound of Silence" (Note: Originally released by Simon & Garfunkel in 1964 and titled "The Sound of Silence". Velasquez recorded portions of the song as an epilogue and prologue for her 1996 album, Retro.)	Regine Velasquez	Paul Simon	Retro	1996	
"A Star Burns Bright (At Christmas)"	Regine Velasquez	John Vallins; Gary Keady	Love Was Born on Christmas Day	1996	
"Still in Love"	Regine Velasquez	Brian McKnight	Covers Volume 2	2006	
"Stop! In the Name of Love"	Regine Velasquez, Donna Cruz and Mikee Cojuangco	Lamont Dozier; Eddie Holland; Brian Holland	Do Re Mi	1996	
"Straight Up"	Regine Velasquez	Elliot Wolff	Covers Volume 2	2006	
"Strawberry Fields Forever"	Regine Velasquez	John Lennon; Paul McCartney	Low Key	2008	
"Superstar"	Regine Velasquez	Bonnie Bramlett; Delaney Bramlett; Leon Russell	Retro	1996	
"Tadhana" †	Regine Velasquez	Armi Millare	R3.0	2017	
"Tahan"	Regine Velasquez	Cacai Velasquez; Regine Velasquez	Paano Kita Iibigin	2007	
"Take a Chance on Me"	Regine Velasquez	Benny Andersson; Björn Ulvaeus	Covers Volume 2	2006	
"Taking Flight"	Regine Velasquez	Rox Santos	R3.0	2017	
"Takipsilim"	Gloc-9 and Regine Velasquez	Aristotle Pollisco	Liham at Lihim	2013	
"Tanging Mahal"	Regine Velasquez	Ogie Alcasid	Pangako Ikaw Lang	2001	
"Tayong Dalawa"	Regine Velasquez	Trina Belamide	Reigne	2001	
"Tell Me"	Ariel Rivera and Regine Velasquez	Louie Ocampo	In My Life	2003	
"Tell Me That You Love Me"	Regine Velasquez	Terri Gibbs	Low Key	2008	
"That's Why I Love You"	Andrew E. and Regine Velasquez	Andrew Espiritu	Krispy Na Kreamy Pa	2000	
"The Only Exception" †	Regine Velasquez	Hayley Williams; Josh Farro	Reginified	2024	
"This Time"	Regine Velasquez	Yman Panaligan	Reigne	2001	
"This Time"	Regine Velasquez	Nyoy Volante	Fantasy	2010	
"Till I Met You" †	Regine Velasquez	Odette Quesada	Till I Met You	2006	
"To Reach You" †	Regine Velasquez	Lisa Dy; Chat Zamora	Reigne	2001	
"Tomorrow"	Regine Velasquez	Charles Strouse; Martin Charnin	Hulog Ka ng Langit	2013	
"Tonight"	Regine Velasquez	Janno Gibbs	Reason Enough	1993	
"Touched By Your Love "	Regine Velasquez	Marita Manuel	Songs from Adarna: The Mythical Bird	1997	
"True Romance" †	Regine Velasquez	Janno Gibbs	Fantasy	2010	
"Tunay Na Kayamanan" #	Regine Velasquez	Arlene Calvo	None (Note: Velasquez recorded "Tunay Na Kayamanan" as the main theme song for the television series Poor Señorita in 2016.)	2016	
"Tuwing Umuulan (At Kapiling Ka)" † (Note: Velasquez performed "Tuwing Umuulan (At Kapiling Ka)" for her live album Regine Live: Songbird Sings the Classics.)	Regine Velasquez	Ryan Cayabyab	Kailangan Ko'y Ikaw	2000	
"Unbreakable" †	Regine Velasquez and Moira Dela Torre	Trisha Denise; Vanessa Valdez; Jonathan Manalo	None (Note: Velasquez recorded "Unbreakable" as the main theme song for the movie Unbreakable in 2019.)	2019	
"Underrated"	Regine Velasquez	Jimmy Borja	R3.0	2017	
"Urong Sulong" †	Regine Velasquez	Christine Bendebel	Regine	1987	
"Usahay"	Regine Velasquez	Gregorio Labja	R3.0	2017	
"Wait and See"	Regine Velasquez	Kazufumi Miyazawa	My Love Emotion	1995	
"Walang Hanggang Ikaw"	Regine Velasquez	Jungee Marcelo	R3.0	2017	
"Walang Iba"	Regine Velasquez	Ogie Alcasid	Fantasy	2010	
"Walk in Love"	Regine Velasquez	David Batteau; John Klemmer	Low Key	2008	
"The Warrior is a Child"	Regine Velasquez	Twila Paris	R3.0	2017	
"The Way Love's Meant to Be"	Regine Velasquez	John Laudon; H. Yu	Listen Without Prejudice	1994	
"We Will Be Together"	Regine Velasquez	Waymon Chapman; Alex Yang	Listen Without Prejudice	1994	
"Weeping Willows, Cattails"	Regine Velasquez	Gordon Lightfoot	Low Key	2008	
"What About Love"	Regine Velasquez	Brian Allen; Sheron Alton; Jim Vallance	Fantasy	2010	
"What Are You Doing the Rest of Your Life" ‡	Regine Velasquez	Alan Bergman; Marilyn Bergman; Michel Legrand	Regine Live: Songbird Sings the Classics	2000	
"What Kind of Fool Am I?" †	Regine Velasquez	Leslie Bricusse; Anthony Newley	Listen Without Prejudice	1994	
"What We've Got"	Regine Velasquez	Trina Belamide	None (Note: Velasquez recorded "What We've Got" as a non-album single in 2000 and released digitally in 2020.)	2000	
"What You Are to Me"	Regine Velasquez	Reuben Laurente; Markel Luna	Reigne	2001	
"When I Fall in Love"	Nonoy Zuñiga and Regine Velasquez	Victor Young; Edward Heyman	The Love Album	2005	
"When You Believe"	Regine Velasquez and Lani Misalucha	Kenneth Edmonds; Stephen Schwartz	Kris Aquino: The Greatest Love	2008	
"Whenever We Say Goodbye"	Regine Velasquez	Trina Belamide	Drawn	1998	
"Where Are You Now?"	Regine Velasquez	Mark J. Feist	Drawn	1998	
"Where Do I Begin"	Regine Velasquez	Francis Lai; Carl Sigman	R3.0	2017	
"Wherever I Go"	Regine Velasquez	Liza Dy	Till I Met You	2006	
"Will There Really Be a Morning?"	Regine Velasquez	Joaquin Francisco Sanchez	Regine	1987	
"Wired for Love"	Regine Velasquez	Justin Wilde; Robert Greenberg	Nineteen 90	1989	
"With a Smile" †	Regine Velasquez	Ely Buendia	Pangako Ikaw Lang	2001	
"With You I'm Born Again" ‡	Regine Velasquez (featuring Gerard Salonga)	Carol Connors; David Shire	Regine Live: Songbird Sings the Classics	2000	
"A World of Friends" #	Regine Velasquez	Ryan Cayabyab; Joey Reyes	None (Note: Velasquez recorded "A World of Friends" as a promotional single for the Philippine Animal Welfare Society (PAWS) during its annual World Animal Day Philippines celebration.)	2021	
"Written in the Sand" #	Regine Velasquez	Agnes Caballa; Danny Tan	None (Note: Velasquez recorded "Written in the Sand" in 1999. The single premiered during the international broadcast of the BBC television special 2000 Today.)	1999	
"Xanadu"	Regine Velasquez	Jeff Lynne	Covers Volume 2	2006	
"You"	Regine Velasquez	Randy Edelman	Hulog Ka ng Langit	2013	
"You Are My Song" †	Regine Velasquez	Martin Nievera; Louie Ocampo	Wanted: Perfect Mother	1996	
"You and Me"	Regine Velasquez	Jason Wade; Jude Cole	Fantasy	2010	
"You Don't Know"	Regine Velasquez	Ogie Alcasid	Fantasy	2010	
"You Got It"	Regine Velasquez	Jeff Lynne; Roy Orbison; Tom Petty	Hulog Ka ng Langit	2013	
"You Were Meant for Me"	Regine Velasquez	Mon Espia	Nineteen 90	1989	
"You Were There" †	Regine Velasquez	Phil Buckle	Retro	1996	
"You Will Be My Music" ‡	Regine Velasquez	Joseph Raposo	Regine Live: Songbird Sings the Classics	2000	
"You'll Never Walk Alone"	Regine Velasquez	Richard Rodgers; Oscar Hammerstein II	Regine: Special Edition	1989	
"You've Made Me Stronger" †	Regine Velasquez	Trina Belamide	My Love Emotion	1995	
"Zoom" †	Regine Velasquez	Len Barry; Bobby Eli	Retro	1996	
