= R-15 (concert) =

2001 concert by Regine Velasquez

- Concert by Regine Velasquez
- Promotional poster for the show
- Location: Ermita, Manila, Philippines
- Venue: Manila Hotel
- Start date: April 21, 2001
- No. of shows: 1

Regine Velasquez concert chronology
- Songbird Sings the Classics (2000); R-15 (2001); Regine at the Movies (2001)

R-15 was a concert by Filipino singer Regine Velasquez held on April 21, 2001, at the Grand Ballroom of the Manila Hotel in Ermita. The show's concept and name is a reference to the fifteenth anniversary of Velasquez's professional debut in 1986. It was produced by EE Concert Productions, with Freddie Santos as the stage director. Gerard Salonga served as the music director and conductor, backed by the Manila Philharmonic Orchestra. The set list featured songs from Velasquez's discography, including tracks from her cover albums.

== Background and development ==
Regine Velasquez's career began with a record deal with OctoArts International and the release of her single "Love Me Again" in 1986. After appearing in the variety show The Penthouse Live!, she caught the attention of Ronnie Henares, a producer and talent manager who signed her to a management deal. The following year, she released her debut album Regine (1987) through Viva Records. In 1993, she signed an international record deal with PolyGram Records, and achieved commercial success in Asia with her albums Listen Without Prejudice (1994), My Love Emotion (1995) and Retro (1996). In April 1996, Velasquez staged a show, titled Isang Pasasalamat, at the University of the Philippines's Sunken Garden to celebrate her ten-year career milestone.

In April 2001, the Philippine Daily Inquirer published that Velasquez would headline a concert on the eve of her birthday on April 21, at the Manila Hotel's Fiesta Pavilion Grand Ballroom in Ermita. The show, titled R-15, was a "double celebration" which also marked the fifteenth anniversary of Velasquez's professional debut. Discussing her milestone, Velasquez stated: "This career made it possible for me to give my family a comfortable life. It taught me courage, self-confidence, and perseverance. I matured a lot because of this business." R-15 was produced by EE Concert Productions, with Freddie Santos as the stage director. She re-teamed with Gerard Salonga, who served as the show's music director and conductor, after their first collaboration in her concert Songbird Sings the Classics in 2000. Velasquez and Salonga were accompanied by the Manila Philharmonic Orchestra.

== Synopsis ==
The concert opened with Velasquez's performance of "Love Me Again" accompanied by the Manila Philharmonic Orchestra. She continued with two songs from her debut studio album: "Urong Sulong" and "Kung Maibabalik Ko Lang". Shortly after, she sang "Narito Ako" from Nineteen 90 (1990), before performing her cover of ABBA's "Dancing Queen" from her album R2K (2000), which was mashed with Orleans's "Dance with Me", a song from the cover album Retro (1996). During "Follow the Sun", a single from her Asian release Listen Without Prejudice (1994), Velasquez approached and mingled with the audience. Next, she began with "You've Made Stronger" from My Love Emotion (1995) and performed a medley of her duets joined by her background vocalists.

The setlist continued with an acoustic performance of a track from her 1993 album Reason Enough titled "Sana Maulit Muli", which was followed by renditions of Velasquez's soundtrack themes, "Kailangan Ko'y Ikaw", "Pangako", and "You Are My Song". She followed this with her cover of Jeffrey Osborne's "On the Wings of Love". The next number saw her perform a Spanish version of her single "Ikaw" from Drawn (1998), entitled "Tu". Southern Sons's "You Were There" was performed, before Velasquez closed the show with "You'll Never Walk Alone". After the song, she bowed and thanked the audience before exiting the stage. For the encore, Velasquez returned onstage for "Tuwing Umuulan" and "Never Ever Say Goodbye".

== Set list ==
This set list is adapted from the television special R-15. (Note: R-15 was aired as a television special in 2001 on GMA Network.)

1. "Love Me Again"
2. "Urong-Sulong"
3. "Kung Maibabalik Ko Lang"
4. "Narito Ako"
5. "Dancing Queen" / "Dance with Me"
6. "Follow the Sun"
7. "You've Made Me Stronger"
8. "Please Be Careful with My Heart" / "In Love with You" / "Forever" / "Muli" / "Magkasuyo Buong Gabi"
9. "Sana Maulit Muli"
10. "Kailangan Ko'y Ikaw"
11. "Pangako"
12. "You Are My Song"
13. "On the Wings of Love"
14. "Tu"
15. "You Were There"
16. "You'll Never Walk Alone"
17. "Tuwing Umuulan"

Encore

18. "Never Ever Say Goodbye"

== See also ==
- List of Regine Velasquez live performances
