= Covers (Regine Velasquez album) =

Covers Volume 1

Studio album by Regine Velasquez
- Released: October 10, 2004
- Recorded: 2003–September 2004
- Genre: Pop
- Length: 79:54
- Languages: English; Tagalog
- Label: Viva
- Producers: Regine Velasquez; Vic del Rosario, Jr. (executive); Vincent del Rosario (executive); Baby Gil (supervising); Alwyn B. Cruz (supervising)

Regine Velasquez chronology
| Viva Platinum Collection (2004) | Covers Volume 1 (2004) | Two of a Kind (2004) |

Singles from Covers Volume 1
- 1. "Forevermore" Released: August 2004; 2. "Minsan Lang Kitang Iibigin" Released: October 2004; 3. "Say That You Love Me" Released: October 2004; 4. "Araw-Gabi" Released: August 2005

Covers (also known as Covers Volume 1) is the twelfth studio album by Filipino singer Regine Velasquez, released in the Philippines on October 10, 2004, by Viva Records. It is a cover album that consists of love songs, originally recorded by male OPM acts from the 80's and 90's. It turned Platinum, three days after its official release.

The album was released on digital download through iTunes on August 1, 2004, with a slightly different cover. To date, the album has sold over 160,000 copies in the country, certified Quadruple Platinum by the Philippine Association of the Record Industry (PARI).

== Background ==
Early in 2004, Velasquez has not yet released any studio album since Reigne (2001), which was released three years before. She has only released a few soundtracks from her hit movies and compilations of her past songs. This was the reason Viva Recording Management decided for Velasquez to record another full studio album. Like R2K (1999), her last all-remake album, Covers consists of revivals hence the title of the album.

=== Concept ===
Covers, from the title itself, is a revival album. The idea of doing renditions of all-male OPM classics came up from Velasquez herself. According to her, it is a compilation of most of her favorite OPM songs rendered by mostly male artists. On an interview, she said "This is my way of introducing the young set of listeners to the beauty of OPM past". She said that she decided to come out with another revival album because "these songs are really beautiful and it will be a good idea to re-introduce them to the younger crowd". She further stated that she did not have a love life during that time, that is why the concept of the album is songs by male singers.

== Production and recording ==
Velasquez considers Covers as the most expensive album she has ever made, due to the fact that the original composers of the songs secure the rights of their materials, that her record company had to pull some strings just get their permission. She explained "On my part, I wouldn't have persisted on getting the songs if I felt I wouldn't be able to add something new to these. I'm not the type who'd remake something that's already perfect the first time around". Although, she just mentioned updating the arrangement and not revising too much of the materials, out of respect for the works.

She stated "I gave VIVA a list of my favorite songs and let them take care of it. Some songs in the list had to go for two reasons—one is because VIVA can't get the rights for the song, and two, because the original version is much too beautiful already to be altered". Each of the album's tracks was recorded for no more than forty-five minutes. Velasquez stated that if the time reaches above that limit, she begins to go deaf. She also admitted that as her study, she recorded the instrumental versions of all the tracks on a cassette tape, and played it in her car over and over again to know how she will perform the back-up vocals.

=== Songs ===
"Minsan Lang Kitang Iibigin" has personal resonance to both Velasquez and her former boyfriend Ariel Rivera, but she explains "that's not the reason why I chose the song". She stated that since the first she heard the song (from Rivera's album Simple Lang), it became her favorite. She also considers the album to be Rivera's best so far. However, she did not have to get his permission to allow her to revive the song, saying "I didn't have to because it wasn't Ariel who wrote the song. I did mention it to him casually during one taping for Forever in My Heart and he just said, 'That's nice'". "Say That You Love Me" has a significance in Velasquez's life. She expressed falling in love with the song, when Louie Ocampo re-arranged it during her tenth anniversary concert held at University of the Philippines Diliman. "Di Bale Na Lang" marks the first time in her career that she has done some rap verses. She was mentored by Filipino rapper-composer Andrew E., saying "it was fun doing the song, fun working with Andrew. He wrote the verses when he was in the studio na lang. Such an intelligent guy...". "Pangarap Ko'y Ikaw" is the only original song in the album. It was originally written for a male singer, but when Velasquez heard the song and got interested to it, she asked the composers, Raul Mitra and her sister Cacai, to lend it to her. The song "Dadalhin" originally included in her album Reigne, was re-recorded in an acoustic version and was put in the album as a hidden track.

== Track listing ==
Covers – Standard edition All tracks are produced by Regine Velasquez except where noted.
| No. | Title | Writer(s) | Original artist | Length |
|---|---|---|---|---|
| 1. | "Ako'y Iyong Iyo" | Ogie Alcasid | Alcasid | 5:31 |
| 2. | "Minsan Lang Kita Iibigin" | Aaron Paul Del Rosario | Ariel Rivera | 3:39 |
| 3. | "Forevermore" | Joey Benin | Side A | 5:12 |
| 4. | "Araw-Gabi (featuring Nonoy Zuniga)" | Ryan Cayabyab | Zuniga | 4:38 |
| 5. | "Say That You Love Me^{[a]}" | Louie Ocampo; Allan Ayque | Basil Valdez | 5:46 |
| 6. | "Di Bale Na Lang (featuring Andrew E.) / Dadalhin (Hidden Track)" | Gary Valenciano; Tats Faustino | Valenciano | 4:04 |
| 7. | "Each Day With You" | Franklink Kleiner; Benedict Say | Martin Nievera | 4:09 |
| 8. | "Pangarap Ko'y Ikaw" | Raul Mitra; Cacai Velasquez-Mitra | | 3:36 |
| 9. | "Perfect (with Medwin Marfil of True Faith)" | Marfil | True Faith | 4:20 |
| 10. | "Paalam^{[a]} / Ang Aking Awitin (featuring Jay Durias of South Border) (Hidden Track)" | Ocampo; Rowena Arieta; Randy Ray | Valdez; Side A | 4:16 |
| 11. | "Ikaw Ang Lahat Sa Akin^{[a]}" | Cecile Azarcon | Nievera | 5:21 |
| 12. | "Hang On" | Faustino | Valenciano | 4:30 |
| 13. | "Mahal Na Mahal Kita" | Archie Dairocas | Archie D. | 5:26 |
| 14. | "Only You (with Naldy Gonzales of Side A)" | Benin | Side A | 4:12 |
| 15. | "Kailan^{[b]}" | Fred Areza | Valdez | 5:00 |

=== Notes ===
- ^{^[a]} co-produced with Louie Ocampo
- ^{^[b]} co-produced with Gerard Salonga
- "Pangarap Ko'y Ikaw" and "Dadalhin" are original songs.
- The standard edition of the album includes a bonus VCD containing:
  1. "Minsan Lang Kitang Iibigin" (music video)
  2. "Forevermore" (theme from Forever in My Heart) (music video)
  3. "Say That You Love Me" (music video)
  4. "Pangarap Ko'y Ikaw" (music video)

== Personnel ==
Credits adapted from the liner notes of Covers.

=== Recording locations ===
- Amerasian Studios (Quezon City)
- The ATTIC
- Acoustic Underground
- MXN Studio

=== Vocals ===
- Regine Velasquez - Vocals (all tracks), background vocals (1,3,13)
- Nonoy Zuniga - vocals and background vocals (4)
- Andrew E. - vocals (6)
- Medwin Marfil - vocals (9)
- Jay Durias - vocals (10)
- Naldy Gonzales - vocals (14)
- Annie Nepomuceno - background vocals (2)
- Annie Quintos - background vocals (2)
- Moy Ortiz - background vocals (2)
- Zebedee Zuniga - background vocals (4)

=== Instrumentation ===
- Ric Mercado - guitar (1,5,10,11)
- Roy Mercado - drums (1)
- Cesar Aguas - guitar (2,6,9)
- DJ Francisco - violin (2,4,6,15)
- Ed Pasamba - cello (2,4,6,15)
- Rodel Lorenzo - viola (2,4,6)
- Ma. Cecilia Obtinario - violin (2,4,6,15)
- Renato Amoranto - oboe (2)
- Miong Pacana - bass guitar (6,9)
- Mike Alba - percussion (9)
- Mon Espia - guitar (10)
- Tina Pasamba - cello (15)
- Mitch Magadia - violin (15)

=== Production ===
- Regine Velasquez - producer (all tracks), background vocal arrangement (1,3,6,13)
- Vic Del Rosario - executive producer
- Vincent Del Rosario - executive producer
- Baby Gil - supervising producer
- Alwyn B. Cruz - supervising producer
- Mark Lopez - arranger (2,4)
- Rodel Lorenzo - additional string arrangement (2,4,6)
- Moy Ortiz - background vocal arrangement (2)
- Zebedee Zuniga - background vocal arrangement (4,12)
- Raul Mitra - arranger (3,8)
- Nino Regalado - arranger (7,12,14)
- Ric Mercado - arranger (1)
- Louie Ocampo - arranger and co-producer (5,10,11)
- Jimmy Antiporda - arranger (6)
- Cesar Aguas - arranger (6,9)
- Mon Espia - arranger (10)
- Jay Durias - arranger (13)
- Gerard Salonga - arranger and co-producer (15)

=== Technical ===
- Erik Payumo - mastering (all tracks),mixing and recording engineer (3,6,8,9,13)
- Raul Mitra - mixing (3,8), recording engineer (3,8)
- Aji Manalo - mixing and recording engineer (15)
- Jerry Joanino - mixing and recording engineer (5,10,11)

=== Design ===
- Jun De Leon - photography
- Sam S. Samson - album cover and lay-out design
- Diana Velasquez-Roque - production assistant
- Mike Duran - production assistant

== Sales and certifications ==
| Region | Certification | Certified units/sales |
|---|---|---|
| Philippines (PARI) | 4× Platinum | 160,000 |

== Release history ==
| Region | Release date | Label | Edition | Catalogue |
|---|---|---|---|---|
| United States | August 1, 2004 | Viva | Standard (Digital download) | |
| Philippines | October 10, 2004 | Viva | Standard (CD+VCD) | VR CDS 04 140 |
| Philippines | October 10, 2004 | Viva | Standard (Cassette) | VR CAS 04 140 |
