= Regine (disambiguation) =

Regine is a feminine given name.

Regine may also refer to:

- Regine (1927 film), a German silent drama film
- Regine (1935 film), a German drama film
- Regine (1956 film), a West German drama film
- Regine (album), a 1987 album by Regine Velasquez
