= Listen Without Prejudice =

Listen Without Prejudice may refer to:

- Listen Without Prejudice Vol. 1, a 1990 album by George Michael
- Listen Without Prejudice (Regine Velasquez album), a 1994 album by Regine Velasquez
