= Regine Live: Songbird Sings the Classics =

Live album by Regine Velasquez
- Released: December 2, 2000
- Recorded: October 6, 2000
- Venue: Westin Philippine Plaza, Pasay, Philippines
- Genre: pop; Blues; jazz
- Length: 67:12
- Label: Viva Records
- Producer: Regine Velasquez; Gerard Salonga; Vic del Rosario Jr. (executive); Vincent del Rosario (executive)

Regine Velasquez chronology
| Kailangan Ko'y Ikaw (2000) | Regine Live: Songbird Sings the Classics (2000) | Reigne (2001) |

Singles from Regine Live: Songbird Sings the Classics
- 1. "With You I'm Born Again" Released: October 2000

Regine Live: Songbird Sing the Classics is a live album by Filipino singer-actress Regine Velasquez, released in the Philippines on December 2, 2000, by Viva Records. The album was certified 6× Platinum by PRIMA, denoting shipments of 200,000+ copies sold in Philippines.

This album was recorded live from Velasquez's concert Songbird Sings the Classics at The Westin Philippine Plaza on October 6, 2000.

== Critical reception ==
Professional ratings
Review scores
| Source | Rating |
|---|---|
| AllMusic | 3/5 stars |

In a review of the album, David Gonzales of AllMusic wrote: "Velasquez's voice is difficult to hear on the beginning of "Autumn Leaves", a problem which plagues other songs here, including "Sometime Somewhere", "If You Go Away", "What Are You Doing the Rest of Your Life", and "Run to You", among others. She sings in a very high, thin register in the beginning of many songs, and this probably contributes to the problem, but the technical mixing could have been better, too."

== Track listing ==
Regine Live: Songbird Sing the Classics track listing
| No. | Title | Writer(s) | Length |
|---|---|---|---|
| 1. | "Songbird" (Opening Number) | Dave Wolfert; Stephen Nelson | 2:55 |
| 2. | "You Will Be My Music" | Joseph Raposo | 3:55 |
| 3. | "Mancini Medley ^{1}" | Henry Mancini; John Mercer; Leslie Bricus | 3:55 |
| 4. | "Autumn Leaves" | Mercer; Jacques Anne Prevert | 3:50 |
| 5. | "Tuwing Umuulan" | Ryan Cayabyab | 4:40 |
| 6. | "Basil Valdez Medley ^{2}" | George Canseco; Cayabyab; Fred Areza | 8:20 |
| 7. | "Sometime Somewhere" | Cayabyab | 5:30 |
| 8. | "Breaking Up Is Hard to Do" | Neil Sedaka; Howard Greenfield | 3:45 |
| 9. | "If You Go Away" | Jacques Romain; Brel-Rod McQuain | 4:44 |
| 10. | "What Are You Doing the Rest of Your Life" | Alan and Marilyn Bergman; Michel Legrand | 3:53 |
| 11. | "(I Wanna) Run to You" | Jud Friedman; Allan Rich | 4:51 |
| 12. | "With You I'm Born Again" (featuring Gerard Salonga) | Carol Connors; David Shire | 4:08 |
| 13. | "Kailangan Ko'y Ikaw" | Ogie Alcasid | 3:35 |
| 14. | "Barry Manilow Medley ^{3}" | Adrienne Anderson; Barry Manilow; Randy Edelman; Martin Panzer | 8:11 |
| 15. | "Somewhere" (hidden track) | Leonard Bernstein; Stephen Sondheim | 3:15 |

^{1} ("Moon River", "Two for the Road", "Moment to Moment")
^{2} ("Ngayon at Kailanman", "Iduyan Mo", "Kailan", "Hangggang sa Dulo ng Walang Hanggan", "Kastilyong Buhangin")
^{3} ("Could It Be Magic", "Weekend in New England", "Even Now", "If I Should Love Again")

== Musicians ==
- Gerard Salonga – conductor, piano
- Rica Arambulo – synthesizer
- Cesar Aguas – guitars (acoustic)
- Nino Regalado – drums
- Roger Herrera – guitars (electric), bass
- Benjie Bautista – violins
- DJ Francisco – violins
- Gonzalo Estrada – violins
- Bernadette Cardoniga – violins
- Jeremy Dadap – violins
- Rochel Lorenzo – violas
- Cecilia Obtinaro – violas
- Ed Pasamba – cellos
- Tina Pasamba – cellos

== See also ==
- Regine Velasquez discography
- List of best-selling albums in the Philippines
