= My Love Emotion =

Studio album by Regine Velasquez
- Released: 1995
- Recorded: 1994–1995
- Genre: Pop
- Length: 47:53
- Label: Polycosmic Records, Mercury Records
- Producer: Regine Velasquez, Primeline Management, Chito Ilagan, Alex Chan, Dezmond Doo

Regine Velasquez chronology
Listen Without Prejudice (1994)	My Love Emotion (1995)	Love Was Born On Christmas Day (1996)

Alternative cover
- Japan Release Cover

Professional ratings
Review scores
Source	Rating
All Music	4/5 stars
Artist Direct	4/5 stars

My Love Emotion is the seventh studio album of Filipino singer-actress Regine Velasquez, released in 1995 by Polycosmic Records in the Philippines, and distributed by Mercury Records. It was also released in other part of Asia like Hong Kong, Japan, China, Taiwan, Indonesia and Thailand under PolyGram Records.

Southern Sons's frontman, Phil Buckle, saw Velasquez in one of her performances in Singapore and later offered to collaborate with her, writing the title track for the album. The album made a combined regional and domestic sales of 250,000 copies, although it did not achieve the commercial and critical heights of its predecessor Listen Without Prejudice (1994).

== Track listing ==
My Love Emotion – Standard edition. Credits are adapted from the liner notes.

No.	Title	Writer(s)	Length
1.	"My Love Emotion"	Phil Buckle	5:39
2.	"You've Made Me Stronger"	Trina Belamide, Alvin Nunez	4:10
3.	"Learning From Love"	Younky Soewarno, Tegku Malinda	3:56
4.	"Send Me Someone To Love"	Curtis Mayfield, Mel Villena	3:50
5.	"Wait And See"	Kazufumi Miyazawa	5:41
6.	"Fast"	Trina Belamide, Mark Lopez	3:50
7.	"My Sweet Home"	Mariya Takeuchi, Tommy Snyder, Tatsushi Umeyaki	5:35
8.	"Perfect" (featuring The TUX)	Fairground Attraction	3:33
9.	"Days Like These"	Louis Biancaniello, David Harper	4:36
10.	"Can't Stop Thinking About Love"	Gino Cruz	5:23
11.	"Goodbye"	Louie Ocampo, Martin Nievera	4:00

Japanese edition (bonus track)
No.	Title	Writer(s)	Length
13.	"Just One More Time"	Mariya Takeuchi	4:10

== Sales and certifications ==
Region	Certification	Certified units/sales
China	—	125,000
Philippines (PARI)	3× Platinum	125,000

== Release history ==
Country	Distributor	Year
Hong Kong	PolyGram Records	1995
Singapore	PolyGram Records	1995
China	PolyGram Records	1995
Malaysia	PolyGram Records	1995
Korea	PolyGram Records	1995
Taiwan	PolyGram Records	1995
Indonesia	PolyGram Records	1995
Philippines	Polycosmic Records, Mercury Records	1995

== See also ==
- Regine Velasquez discography
- List of best-selling albums in the Philippines
