= Tagala Talaga =

Studio album by Regine Velasquez
- Released: October 1991
- Genre: Pop, OPM
- Length: 32:52
- Language: Tagalog
- Label: Sunshine/Vicor
- Producer: Chito Ilagan (executive); Ronnie Henares; Bambi Santos (assistant producer)

Regine Velasquez chronology
Nineteen 90 (1989)	Tagala Talaga (1991)	Reason Enough (1993)

Singles from Tagala Talaga
- 1. "Buhay Ng Buhay Ko" Released: October 1991; 2. "Kahit Ika’y Panaginip Lang" Released: November 1991

Professional ratings
Review scores
Source	Rating
Rate Your Music	3.5/5 stars

Tagala Talaga is the third studio album by Filipino singer-actress Regine Velasquez, released in October 1991 by Vicor Records in the Philippines in LP, cassette and CD format. It is her second album from Vicor Music Corporation after Nineteen 90 (1989). The album was produced by her then manager Ronnie Henares and consisted of Velasquez’ renditions of classic Filipino compositions by Freddie Aguilar, Ryan Cayabyab, Willy Cruz and George Canseco among others. The carrier single released is "Buhay Ng Buhay Ko" originally done by the Leah Navarro and composed by Nonong Pedero. The album was certified gold and double platinum by the Philippine Association of the Record Industry (PARI).

== Background ==
Tagala Talaga ("A Genuine Tagalog Lady") is her last album from Vicor Music Corporation before moving to Polycosmic Records. The album was her first all covers album re-interpreting classic OPM songs including compositions from National Artists for Music Awardees Ryan Cayabyab, Lucio D. San Pedro, and Levi Celerio. Velasquez had a concert with the same album title under the direction of Freddie Santos with the Philippine Philharmonic Orchestra after the album release.

== Track listing ==
No.	Title	Writer(s)	Original Artist(s)	Length
1.	"Maghihintay Ako Sa Iyo"	Louie Ocampo, Baby Gil	Anthony Castelo	03:54
2.	"Buhay Ng Buhay Ko"	Nonong Pedero	Leah Navarro	03:51
3.	"Sa Ugoy Ng Duyan" (with The Philippine Philharmonic Orchestra)	Lucio San Pedro, Levi Celerio	Irma Potenciano, Aurelio Estanislao, Evelyn Mandac	05:55
4.	"Kahit Ika'y Panaginip Lang"	Ryan Cayabyab	Basil Valdez	04:32
5.	"Sa Duyan Ng Pag-ibig"	Willy Cruz	Nonoy Zuñiga	03:36
6.	"Hagkan"	Louie Ocampo, Rowena Arrieta	Sharon Cuneta	03:14
7.	"Anak" (with The Philippine Philharmonic Orchestra)	Freddie Aguilar	Freddie Aguilar	03:55
8.	"Kastilyong Buhangin"	George Canseco	Basil Valdez	03:58

== Album Credits ==
Personnel

- Chito Ilagan – executive producer
- Ronnie Henares – producer
- Bambi Santos – assistant producer
- Ida Ramos-Henares – cover and design
- Jojo Isorena – cover and design
- Romy Peralta – photography

Production

- The Philippine Philharmonic Orchestra – orchestration, strings (tracks 3 and 7)
- Restituto Umali – conductor, arranger (tracks 3 and 7)
- Louie Ocampo – arranger (tracks 1 and 6)
- Eric Antonio – arranger (track 2)
- Henry Garcia – arranger (tracks 4 and 8)
- Carlo Bulahan – arranger (track 5)

== See also ==
- Regine Velasquez discography
- List of best-selling albums in the Philippines
