= Till I Met You =

- Poster
- Directed by: Mark A. Reyes
- Screenplay by: Benedict Mique
- Story by: Annette Gozon
- Produced by: Jose Mari Abacan; Veronique Del Rosario; Annette Gozon-Abrogar; Vic del Rosario Jr.
- Starring: Regine Velasquez; Robin Padilla
- Cinematography: Martin Jimenez
- Edited by: Marya Ignacio
- Music by: Arnold Buena; Allan Feliciano
- Production companies: VIVA Films; GMA Films; RCP Productions
- Distributed by: VIVA Films
- Release date: October 11, 2006
- Country: Philippines
- Language: Filipino
- Box office: ₱100,450,200.00

Till I Met You is a 2006 Philippine romantic film directed by Mark A. Reyes. The film stars Regine Velasquez and Robin Padilla.

Its first week gross was ₱40 million with a total lifetime gross of ₱100,450,200.00.

== Synopsis ==
Señor Manuel (Eddie Garcia) is an elderly gentleman who falls in love with the charming Luisa (Regine Velasquez), a confident trickster posing as a rich socialite. In preparation for their upcoming wedding, Señor Manuel takes Luisa back to see his hacienda and introduces his new fiancée to the staff. Among which is Gabriel (Robin Padilla), Manuel's right-hand man, who is not only well respected by the town's people, but is also the one person that Señor Manuel trusts the most. Likewise, Gabriel cares deeply for the old man and is very protective of the haciendero; so much so that during the initial meeting, the fiercely devoted Gabriel immediately becomes suspicious that Luisa is a fake and is only after Señor Manuel's money. In order to expose Luisa as nothing but a gold digger, caught in a tangled web of lies and deceit, all so unexpected... all so unwanted, what twisted fate awaits them?

== Cast ==
Main cast

- Regine Velasquez as Luisa
- Robin Padilla as Gabriel

Supporting cast

- Eddie Garcia† as Señor Manuel
- Marky Cielo† as Bryan
- Jackie Rice as Hazel
- Joonee Gamboa as Mang Pagal
- Mike "Pekto" Nacua as Tikyo
- Luz Valdez as Aling Loleng
- Idda Yaneza as Aling Martha
- Patricia Ismael as Marimar
- Kuh Ledesma as Aling Pacing
- Frannie Zamora as Designer
- Tracy Garcia as Videoke Crowd
- Marc Tupaz as Videoke Crowd
- Donald Rivera as Videoke Crowd
- Sam Santos as Videoke Crowd
- Jaimes Garcia as Videoke Crowd
- July Hidalgo as Drinking Crowd
