= Legacy (1998 film) =

- Film poster
- Directed by: T. J. Scott
- Screenplay by: Kevin Lund; T. J. Scott
- Story by: James Grady
- Produced by: Peer J. Oppenheimer; Dan Reardon; T.J. Scott; Michael D. Sellers; Pamela Vlastas
- Starring: David Hasselhoff; Donita Rose; Rod Steiger; Corin Nemec
- Cinematography: Sharone Meir
- Edited by: Bert Kish
- Music by: Ennio Di Berardo
- Production companies: ABS-CBN Entertainment; Quantum Entertainment; Chrome Pegasus Productions
- Distributed by: Star Pacific Cinema
- Release dates: October 9, 1998 (United States); July 19, 1999 (Philippines)
- Running time: 105 minutes
- Countries: Philippines; United States
- Language: English

Legacy is a 1998 action film directed by T. J. Scott. The film stars David Hasselhoff and Donita Rose.

== Synopsis ==
Jack Scott (David), an American war photographer, goes to the Philippines and helps Lana Cameron (Donita), an Asian American medical student, on a dangerous quest for her legacy and missing father.

== Cast and characters ==
- David Hasselhoff as Jack Scott
- Donita Rose as Lana Cameron
- Rod Steiger as Sadler
- Corin Nemec as Black
- Dennis Padilla as Edge
- Sunshine Dizon as Ding
- Chin Chin Gutierrez as Grace
- German Moreno as Santiago
- Benson Ventura as Hector
- Naess Verano as Zero
- Gary Lim as Bansot
- Richard Joson as Tommy
- Mon Confiado as doorman
- Angelika dela Cruz as The New York Times editor
- Cary Kwasizur as photojournalist

== Production ==
The project was originally intended for Brandon Lee, who died while filming for the 1994 film The Crow.
