= Reigne =

Studio album by Regine Velasquez
- Released: November 29, 2001
- Genres: Pop; OPM
- Length: 73:53
- Languages: English; Tagalog
- Label: Viva
- Producers: Regine Velasquez; Vic del Rosario, Jr. (executive); Vincent G. del Rosario III (executive)

Regine Velasquez chronology
Pangako… Ikaw Lang (2001)	Reigne (2001)	Pangarap Ko ang Ibigin Ka (2003)

Singles from Reigne
- 1. "To Reach You" Released: November 2001; 2. "Dadalhin" Released: May 2002; 3. "Sa Aking Pag-iisa" Released: October 2002

Reigne is the eleventh studio album by Filipino singer-actress Regine Velasquez, released in the Philippines on November 29, 2001, by Viva Records in CD and cassette formats and later in digital download. The album was produced by Velasquez and contained original Filipino compositions by Janno Gibbs, Trina Belamide and Tats Faustino among others. The carrier single released is "To Reach You" composed by Lisa Dy and Chat Zamora. The album was certified triple platinum by the Philippine Association of the Record Industry (PARI).

== Background ==
Reigne is her third studio album from Viva Records after doing two soundtrack albums under the label. The album title is an anagram of Velasquez's name, Regine and later used as one of her signature perfumes for Bench. The album also released a limited specially packaged long box edition that includes limited edition 14-carat gold Reigne necklace, exclusive song lyric booklet and full size photos taken by Jun de Leon, which is not available on the regular edition.

== Singles ==
- The lead single to be taken off the album is "To Reach You". The music video for the single was directed by Louie Ignacio and was nominated at the 2002 MTV Pilipinas Video Awards for Best Song, Best Female Video and Best Director.
- The second single is "Dadalhin" composed by Tats Faustino released in May 2002. The song garnered biggest airplay in local radio stations in Philippine history and remained number 1 until after four months. The song also became 2002's song of the year in the Philippines, and eventually went on to become one of Velasquez's signature original songs.
- The last single released was "Sa Aking Pag-iisa" in October 2002 and composed by fellow singer Janno Gibbs. The remix version of the song was arranged by Raul Mitra and was later included in Velasquez' Greatest Hits: An Audio Visual Anthology compilation album. The music video for the single was directed by Louie Ignacio.

== Regine: The Book ==
Three years after the album has been released, Velasquez together with Filipino photographer Jun de Leon collaborated to create a coffee table book which was named after the successful album. It features 200 pages of Velasquez's photographs chronicled by de Leon after working with the latter for five years. The coffee book comes in a special gift box that includes an EP CD with songs The First Time I Ever Saw Your Face and Misty Glass Window. It was released by Viva Foundation For The Arts.

== Track listing ==
Regine (standard version)

No.	Title	Writer(s)	Length
1.	"To Reach You"	Lisa Dy, Chat Zamora	03:30
2.	"This Time"	Yman Panaligan	04:06
3.	"Nasa Puso"	Moy Ortiz, Edith Gallardo	03:32
4.	"Dadalhin"	Tats Faustino	04:54
5.	"Love On The Airwaves"	Chris Hamlet Thompson, Robert Watson	03:56
6.	"Free Spirits"	Noel Mendez	03:41
7.	"Long For Him"	Lisa Dy	02:53
8.	"Sa Aking Pag-iisa"	Janno Gibbs	03:17
9.	"Perry’s Will" (featuring Cacai Velasquez)	Jingle Buena, Arnold Reyes	04:26
10.	"I Know"	Babsie Molina, Edith Gallardo	05:12
11.	"My Destiny"	Toto Sorioso	03:31
12.	"Bukas Sana"	Mario Borja, Raymund Marcaida	04:31
13.	"Nang Makita Ka"	Teresita Agbayani	03:54
14.	"Let You Be"	Toto Sorioso	04:43
15.	"Could It Be"	Lisa Dy, Chat Zamora	04:21
16.	"What You Are To Me"	Rueben Laurente, Markel Luna	05:16
17.	"Tayong Dalawa"	Trina Belamide	03:53
18.	"Sandcastle"	Patty Mayoralago, Babsie Molina	04:18

Regine: The Book (EP)

No.	Title	Writer(s)	Length
1.	"The First Time Ever I Saw Your Face"	Ewan MacColl	04:28
2.	"Misty Glass Window (I Wish Tonight)"	Pido Lalimarmo	04:19

== Album credits ==
Personnel

- Vic del Rosario, Jr. – executive producer
- Vincent G. del Rosario III – executive producer
- Regine Velasquez – producer
- Jun de Leon – photography

Production

- Regine Velasquez – vocals, background vocals
- Cacai Velasquez-Mitra – background vocals
- Trina Belamide – background vocals
- Marc Lopez – arranger
- Niño Regalado – arranger
- Rudy Lozano – arranger
- Tats Faustino – arranger
- Noel Mendez – arranger
- Raul Mitra – arranger
- Mon Faustino – arranger, vocal arranger, guitars
- Ding Faustino – guitars
- Ric Mercado – arranger, guitars
- Marvin Querido – arranger

== See also ==
- Regine Velasquez discography
- List of best-selling albums in the Philippines
