= Drawn (album) =

Studio album by Regine Velasquez-Alcasid
- Released: November 22, 1998
- Recorded: 1997–1998
- Genres: R&B, pop, easy listening
- Length: 45:27
- Labels: The MJF Company, Viva Records
- Producers: Mark J. Feist for the MJF Company (executive); Vic Del Rosario (executive); Ricky Del Rosario

Regine Velasquez-Alcasid chronology
Very Special (1998)	Drawn (1998)	R2K (1999)

Alternative cover
- Repackaged Release

Professional ratings
Review scores
Source	Rating
AllMusic	4/5 stars

Drawn is the ninth studio album of Filipino singer-actress Regine Velasquez-Alcasid, released on November 22, 1998. The album was recorded from 1997 to 1998. This is the first album that Velasquez ventured into soul and R&B music coming from her previous Asian-pop appeal. It was executively produced by Mark J. Feist of the MJF Company and co-produced by Viva Records. The album is distributed in the Philippines by Viva Music Group. Mark J. Feist also arranged all the tracks, wrote & co-wrote five songs and played instruments throughout. The album was certified 7× Platinum by the Philippine Association of the Record Industry (PARI) for sales of 240,000 units in the Philippines.

== Track listing ==
No.	Title	Writer(s)	Length
1.	"How Could You Leave"	Mark J. Feist	5:39
2.	"Once In A Lifetime Love"	Mark J. Feist, Charlotte Gibson	4:10
3.	"Messin' In My Head"	Mark J. Feist, Shanice Wilson	3:56
4.	"Love Again"	Mark J. Feist, Shanice Wilson	3:50
5.	"Ikaw"	Louie Ocampo, George Canseco	5:41
6.	"Emotion"	Barry Gibb, Robin Gibb	3:50
7.	"Where Are You Now?"	Mark J. Feist	5:35
8.	"Whenever We Say Goodbye"	Trina Belamide	3:33
9.	"Linlangin Mo"	Raul Mitra, Cacai Velasquez-Mitra	4:36
10.	"Our Love"	Michael McDonald, David Pack, Ted Templeman	5:23
11.	"Never Ever Say Goodbye"	Willy Cruz	4:00

== Personnel ==
Production

- Mark J. Feist – arranger except Linlangin Mo and Whenever We Say Goodbye; drums and synthesizers programming for all tracks
- Alex Daye – background vocals for How Could You Leave
- Charlotte Gibson – background vocals for Once In A Lifetime Love and Emotion
- Zebedee Zuniga – background vocals for Whenever We Say Goodbye
- Arnold Buena – arranger for Whenever We Say Goodbye
- Raul Mitra – arranger for Linlangin Mo
- Terrence Elliot – guitars for Once In A Lifetime Love, Love Again, Emotion and Our Love
- all tracks are mixed and recorded at Sailor Records Studio except the tracks Once In A Lifetime Love and Linlangin Mo which recorded at Capitol Recording Studio.

== See also ==
- Regine Velasquez discography
