= Nineteen 90 =

Studio album by Regine Velasquez-Alcasid
- Released: November 11, 1989
- Recorded: Vicor Records (Manila); 1989
- Genre: Pop
- Language: English, Filipino
- Label: Sunshine/Vicor
- Producer: Vic Del Rosario (executive); Orly Ilacad (executive); Ronnie Henares

Regine Velasquez-Alcasid chronology
Regine (1987)	Nineteen 90 (1989)	Tagala Talaga (1991)

Nineteen '90 is the second studio album from Filipina singer-actress Regine Velasquez-Alcasid on November 11, 1989. When it was released, Velasquez was a new contract artist for Vicor Music Corporation. and has signed up under Primeline Management Team under Ronnie Henares and Ida Henares. The album was recorded in Manila and was originally available in LP and cassette format. Later on, it was released in CD format.

== Songs ==
All the materials for Nineteen '90 are original OPM songs written for Velasquez, produced by Ronnie Henares with the exception of Narito Ako which was originally done by Kundiman artist Maricris Bermont and arranged by Doming Amarillo. This is the first time Velasquez has worked with singer-actor Ogie Alcasid, twenty-two years before they got married.

== Track listing ==
No.	Title	Writer(s)	Arranger(s)	Length
1.	"You Were Meant For Me"	Mon Espia	Cesar Aguas	04:12
2.	"Ngayong Wala Ka Na"	Archie Castillo, Onie Zamora	Cesar Aguas	03:45
3.	"Wired For Love"	Justin Wilde, Robert Greenberg	Mon Faustino	03:07
4.	"Hindi Na, Ayoko Na"	Mon Faustino	Mon Faustino	04:03
5.	"Know It"	Tats Faustino	Tats Faustino	04:06
6.	"Narito Ako"	Nonong Pedero	Louie Ocampo	03:19
7.	"I Have To Say Goodbye"	Ogie Alcasid	Homer Flores	03:50
8.	"Promdi"	Jose Mari Chan, Tessie Tomas	Homer Flores	04:02

== See also ==
- Regine Velasquez discography
- List of best-selling albums in the Philippines
