= Viktoria (singer) =

Filipina singer

- Born: Teresita Viktoria Elizaga Agbayani; July 28, 1969 (age 57); Quezon City Philippines
- Occupation: singer
- Years active: 1990–present

Viktoria (born Teresita Viktoria Elizaga Agbayani on July 28, 1969) is a Filipina singer.

== Early life ==
From the political clan of the Agbayani of Pangasinan, Viktoria started her singing career at age 17. While pursuing her singing career, she managed to finish a Mass communications degree at the University of the Philippines. She is the youngest daughter of Former Governor Aguedo Agbayani of Pangasinan.

== Discography ==
Viktoria first recognition in the Philippines with her music video "Sasabihin Ko Na". Her initial release was soon followed by two other music videos "Dahan Dahan” and "Tender Kisses". Her albums spawned singles such as "Dahan Dahan", "Sana", "Pwede Ba", and "To Be Near You", the single from the Soundtrack of the Hollywood TV series "Felicity".

=== Studio albums ===
- Viktoria (1992; OctoArts International, Inc.)
- Viktorious Viktoria (1995; OctoArts-EMI Music, Inc.)
- Secrets (1999; Sony Music Entertainment Philippines)
- Here To Stay (2005; Warner Music Philippines)
- Vixen (2016; FlipMusic Records)

AWARDS

MTV AWARDS PHILIPPINES 2000- Best Female Music Video

13TH AWIT AWARDS- Best Dance Recording (as producer, songwriter and singer) "Puede Ba"

13TH AWIT AWARDS - Music Video of the Year "Puede Ba"

13TH AWIT AWARDS - Best Performance in a Video "Puede Ba"

13TH AWIT AWARDS - Best Producer "Puede Ba"

KATHA MUSIC AWARDS 2000- Record of the Year

R.X. 93.1 AWARDS 2000- Female OPM Artist of the Year

Gold medalist 23rd SEA Games (sport Muay Thai )

Best Music Video Shockfest Film Festival 2012, Hollywood

Best International Music Video Pollygrind Film Festival 2012, Las Vegas

Nominated Best Soundtrack AOF International Music Festival 2012, Pasadena, California

Nominated Best Music Video AOF International Music Festival 2012, Pasadena, California

== Singles ==
- Addicted
- Are You Ready For Love
- Bongga
- Dahan-Dahan
- Dance With Me
- Dangerous
- Dedma
- Goodbye
- Hmmm Teka
- I Do
- If You Were Mine
- Ilipad Mo Ako
- Mahal Pa Rin Kita
- Nang Makita Ka
- Paano
- Padaplis
- Puede Ba?
- Sana
- Sasabihin Ko Na
- Sexy Boy
- Shubidu
- Tender Kisses
- To Be Near You
- Vixen
- What If
- Working Students

== Awards ==
Year	Award giving body	Category	Nominated work	Results
2000	Awit Awards	Best Dance Recording	"Puede Ba?"	Won
2000	Awit Awards	Best Music Video Producer	"Puede Ba?"	Won
2000	Awit Awards	Best Music Video Performance	"Puede Ba?"	Won
2000	Awit Awards	Best Music Video Director	"Puede Ba?"	Won
2000	Awit Awards	Music Video of the Year	"Puede Ba?"	Won
