= Tats Faustino =

- Origin: Manila, Philippines
- Genres: OPM, pop, r&b, classical, gospel, adult-contemporary
- Occupation(s): Producer, composer, lyricist, singer, arranger, record producer, multi-instrumentalist, drummer, percussionist
- Instrument(s): Drums, electric drums, vocals, piano, keyboards, guitar, synthesizers
- Years active: 1980–present
- Labels: Viva
- Website: www.tatsfaustinomusic.com

Tats Faustino is a Filipino musical composer, arranger, producer, musical director, songwriter, singer, multi-instrumentalist, percussionist, and drummer.

== Work ==
He composed "Hang On" for Gary Valenciano, "Hindi Magbabago" for Randy Santiago, "Dadalhin" for Regine Velasquez, "Nakaraang Pasko" for Kuh Ledesma and later Carol Banawa, Christian Bautista, and Martin Nievera and more original songs for other Filipino music artists.

He was music director/singer of Cicada Band during the late 80s, under the management of Babic Flores-Faustino, who became his wife. He was the resident music director with the SOP Band on SOP, and was resident musical director of Party Pilipinas.

He composed, wrote, and arranged the theme song for Encantadia, "Mahiwagang Puso", sung by Karylle and Jerome John Hughes. He produced a self-titled album of his own hit songs and compositions, Tats Faustino, released under Viva Records in 2006, with first single, "So Romantic". Singles that followed were "There's Nothing Left Inside" and "Dehin Dehin". Richard Gomez directed Tats Faustino's first music video "Dehin Dehin" with Karylle and Rufa Mae Quinto as guests. Al Quinn directed Tats Faustino's second music video "Handa Na" with Daiana Menezes in Enchanted Kingdom. His "Basta Ikaw" was one of the winners of Metropop 2000.

== Personal life ==
Tats Faustino was married to Babic Flores (1959-2020), who sang in his former band, Cicada. They have three children: Carissa, Margarita, and Nico.
