= Regine (album) =

Studio album by Regine Velasquez
- Released: 1987
- Recorded: 1986–1987
- Studio: AD & AD Recording Studios; Cinema Audio Recording Studio; Greenhills Sound Production Studios
- Genre: Pop; OPM
- Length: 30:54
- Language: English; Tagalog
- Label: Viva
- Producer: Ronnie Henares; Spanky Rigor; Vehnee Saturno; Ricky del Rosario (executive); Nonoy Tan (supervising)

Regine Velasquez chronology
Regine (1987)	Nineteen '90 (1989)

Singles from Regine
- 1. "Isang Lahi" Released: 1986; 2. "Kung Maibabalik Ko Lang" Released: 1987; 3. "Maybe Now, Maybe Then" Released: 1987; 4. "Urong Sulong" Released: 1988

Regine is the debut studio album by Filipino singer-actress Regine Velasquez, released in the Philippines in 1987, by Viva Records on LP and cassette and later re-released in 1994 on CD format and on January 6, 2002 as a digital download. The album was produced by Ronnie Henares, her then-manager. The album is distributed in the Philippines by Ivory Records and is composed of original Filipino compositions by Christine Bendebel, Vehnee Saturno and 1980s singer-composer Keno among others, except for "Ebb Tide" originally by Frank Chacksfield and His Orchestra, composed by Robert Maxwell and Carl Sigman. The carrier single was "Kung Maibabalik Ko Lang" together with "Maybe Now, Maybe Then".

== Background ==
Regine is Velasquez's first full studio album released after winning champion at RPN 9's Ang Bagong Kampeon singing competition. Although she recorded a song before the album titled "Love Me Again" released through OctoArts, but with her name "Chona Velasquez". However, in 1986, after performing in Martin Nievera's late night TV program The Penthouse Live! aired over GMA Radio Television Arts, Nievera suggested that she use her own name which is "Regine" than her nickname. It was then that under new management with Ronnie Henares got her a recording contract to Viva Records owned by Mr. Vic del Rosario. The album were produced by Henares, Spanky Rigor and Vehnee Saturno.

The song "Isang Lahi" was earlier used in the film Gabi Na, Kumander. "Kung Maibabalik Ko Lang" is also later used as the theme song of the 1989 movie of the same title starring Maricel Soriano (under Regal Films) and later turned into a Friday segment of Teysi ng Tahanan, which aired by ABS-CBN from 1991 to 1997, hosted by Tessie Tomas.

== Track listing ==
Regine track listing
No.	Title	Writer(s)	Length
1.	"Will There Really Be a Morning?"	Keno	3:27
2.	"Maybe Now, Maybe Then"	Nina Puno	3:35
3.	"Light in the Dark"	Marissa Bunag; Juan Miguel Salvador	4:09
4.	"Kung Maibabalik Ko Lang"	Christine Bendebel	4:27
5.	"The One I Love"	Mon del Rosario	3:21
6.	"Ebb Tide"	Robert Maxwell; Carl Sigman	4:25
7.	"Isang Lahi" (theme song from Gabi Na, Kumander)	Vehnee Saturno	4:01
8.	"Urong Sulong"	Bendebel	3:29
Total length:			30:54

== Release history ==
Region	Release date	Label	Edition	Catalogue
Philippines	1987	Viva	Standard (LP and Cassette)	VLP-87-001
Philippines	1994	Viva	Standard (CD)	VCD-94-059
Philippines	January 6, 2002	Viva	Standard (Digital download)	

== See also ==
- Regine Velasquez discography
- List of best-selling albums in the Philippines
