= Listen Without Prejudice (Regine Velasquez album) =

Studio album by Regine Velasquez
- Released: June 15, 1994
- Recorded: 1993–1994
- Studios: PolyGram Studios and Q Sound Recording Studio (Hong Kong); JR Music Studios and Midi Trax Studio (Manila)
- Genre: Pop
- Labels: Polycosmic Records, Mercury Records
- Producers: Alex Chan (Executive); Ronnie Henares; Chito Ilagan; Regine Velasquez

Regine Velasquez chronology
Reason Enough (1993)	Listen Without Prejudice (1994)	Special Collectors Edition (1994)

Singles from Listen Without Prejudice
- 1. "In Love With You (Featuring Jacky Cheung)" Released: May 26, 1994; 2. "Follow The Sun" Released: September 1, 1994; 3. "The Way Loves Meant To Be" Released: September 20, 1994; 4. "I Would Die For You" Released: October 24, 1994; 5. "Reason Enough" Released: December 21, 1994; 6. "What Kind Of Fool Am I?" Released: January 1, 1995

Alternative Cover
- Asian Cover

Listen Without Prejudice is the debut international studio album and sixth studio album overall of Filipina singer-actress Regine Velasquez. It was released in 1994 in the Philippines by Polycosmic Records and distributed there by Mercury Records; in other parts of Asia, including Hong Kong, Japan, China, Taiwan, Indonesia and Thailand, the album was released by PolyGram Records. Velasquez was the second Filipina artist to be signed on an international record label; the first was Lea Salonga, through Atlantic Records in 1993. The album's lead single "In Love With You" features a duet with Cantonese singer Jacky Cheung, which also included in his Mandarin compilation album True Love. Listen Without Prejudice has sold more than 700,000 copies worldwide, including 100,000 in the Philippines, making it the best-selling album of Velasquez's career to date.

== Track listing ==
"In Love With You" (1994)
A sample of the contemporary love ballad displaying Velasquez's softer, breathier timbre while demonstrating her harmonizing capabilities featuring Cantonese pop singer Jacky Cheung

No.	Title	Writer(s)	Producer(s)	Length
1.	"In Love With You (Duet with Jacky Cheung)"	John Laudon	Michael Au	3:28
2.	"Follow The Sun"	Glenn Medeiros, J. Cronin	Alex Yang	4:53
3.	"The Moment You Were Mine"	B. Nielsen Chapman, S. Dorff	Michael Au	4:47
4.	"Reason Enough"	Trina Belamide	Chito Ilagan, Ronnie Henares	4:06
5.	"What Kind Of Fool Am I?"	Leslie Bricusse, Anthony Newley	Ronnie Henares	4:11
6.	"We Will Be Together"	Alex Yang, Waymon Chapman	Alex Yang	4:43
7.	"The Way Love's Meant To Be"	H. Yu, John Laudon	Joseph LP	4:11
8.	"I'm Lost In A Lonely Harmony"	Romeo Diaz, H. Ebert	Chito Ilagan, Ricky Cortes	3:51
9.	"I Would Die For You"	J. Arden	Joseph LP	4:05
10.	"Say You Love Me"	Patti Austin	Chito Ilagan, Ronnie Henares	4:22
11.	"The Moment You Were Mine (The Reprise)"	B. Nielsen Chapman, S. Dorff	Alex Yang	3:48

== Personnel ==
Credits taken from Listen Without Prejudice liner notes

- Winifred Lai – art direction and image design
- Lawrence Ng – photography
- Ray Chan of Orient 4 – hair
- Boom! – make-up
- Ida Henares – voice image coach
- Louisa Ling – album coordinator
- Primeline Inc. – management
- Regine Velasquez – lead vocals, background vocals, album producer
- Jacky Cheung – guest vocals, background vocals
- Babsie Molina – background vocals
- Sylvia Macaraeg – background vocals
- Michael Au – producer, recording engineer, mixing
- Chito Ilagan – album producer, producer, co-producer, background vocal arrangement
- John Laudon – writer, keyboard and guitar
- Hung Wang Leung – strings, keyboard
- Vistine Pettis – saxophone
- Lam Wing Cheung – recording engineer
- Alex Yang – producer, arranger, mixing, mastering
- Patrick Delay – arranger
- Gary Kum – arranger
- Danny Chan – guitar
- Rico Cristobal – piano
- Robert Porter – recording engineer, mixing, mastering
- Frankie – recording engineer, mixing, mastering
- Chiu Tsang Hei – arranger, background vocals
- Ferment So – guitars
- Ronnie Henares – album producer, producer
- Alvin Nunez – music and arrangement
- Jun Dela Paz – recording engineer
- Joseph LP – producer, mixing
- Ryan Cayabyab – orchestral adaptation and re-arrangement
- Lorrie Ilustre – music and programming
- Waymon Chapman – writer, rap
- Richard Yuen – arranger, piano
- Melcho – drums
- Steve – bass
- Jim – guitars
- Clement Pong – recording engineer
- Romeo Diaz – arranger
- Ricky Cortes – producer, recording engineer
- Homer Flores – music and track arrangement
- Voltaire P. Opriano – recording engineer

== Sales and certifications ==
Region	Certification	Certified units/sales
China	—	300,000
Hong Kong (IFPI Hong Kong)	2× Gold	20,000^{*}
Indonesia (ASIRI)	Gold	
Malaysia (RIM)	Gold	
Philippines (PARI)	2× Platinum	100,000
Singapore (RIAS)	Gold	7,500^{*}
Taiwan (IFPI Taiwan)	2× Platinum	
Thailand	—	20,000
^{*} Sales figures based on certification alone.

== Release history ==
Country	Distributor	Year
Hong Kong	PolyGram Records	1994
Singapore	PolyGram Records	1994
China	PolyGram Records	1994
Malaysia	PolyGram Records	1994
South Korea	PolyGram Records	1994
Taiwan	PolyGram Records	1994
Indonesia	PolyGram Records	1994
Philippines	Polycosmic Records; Mercury Records	1994

== See also ==
- Regine Velasquez discography
