= Louie Ocampo =

Filipino composer and arranger (born 1960)

- Born: Jose Luis Ocampo; June 21, 1960 (age 66)
- Origin: Manila, Philippines
- Genres: OPM, pop, R&B, classical, gospel, adult-contemporary
- Occupations: Composer; songwriter; lyricist; arranger
- Instruments: Piano, keyboards, synthesizers, vocals
- Years active: 1977–present

Jose Luis Ocampo, professionally known as Louie Ocampo (born June 21, 1960) is a Filipino composer and arranger best known for his association with Martin Nievera. Regarded as one of the pillars and icons of Original Pilipino Music (OPM). His numerous hits, mostly collaborations, include Tell Me, Kahit Isang Saglit, Ewan, and You Are My Song.

== Life and career ==
In 1981, Ocampo studied music and film scoring at the Berklee College of Music in Boston, Massachusetts.

== Work ==
Ocampo also created the theme song and music for various media, including:

- Batibot, a children's television show
- "Babalik Ka Rin", a theme song composed by himself with lyrics by Chot Ulep, performed by Gary Valenciano for Duty Free Philippines in 1994
- Eat Bulaga!'s 25th Anniversary in 2004
- "Closer, You and I", used in the commercials of toothpaste Close Up, popularized by Gino Padilla
- "Tell Me", a song originally performed by Joey Albert, also covered by Lea Salonga, Side A, Janet Arnaiz, Thalía, David Pomeranz, and a duet by Ariel Rivera and Regine Velasquez
- "GMA Kapuso Jingle", a theme song of 2002 GMA Network Song performed by Regine Velasquez (1st version) and The Company (2nd version)
- One of the musical directors of the month on SOP Rules
- Arranger for the theme song of the film Felix Manalo, "Ang Sugo ng Diyos sa Mga Huling Araw"
- "Fly with Heart", Philippine Airlines' new jingle for its 85th anniversary in 2026.

He was one of the resident jurors of Pinoy Dream Academy Season II.

He is the original judge of Tawag ng Tanghalan then he came back to It's Showtime as a judge of Quarter 3 in Tawag ng Tanghalan.

== Filmography ==
=== Film ===
As composer

- Like Father, Like Son (1985)
- Forever (1994)
- Wanted: Perfect Mother (1996)
- Lagarista (2000)
- Home Along da Riber (2002)

=== Television ===
- Ryan Ryan Musikahan (1988) as a Special Guest
- Ikaw Lang ang Mamahalin (2001–2002)
- Ikaw Lang ang Mamahalin (2011–2012)
- 24/SG (concert film, 2014)
- Tawag ng Tanghalan (2016–present)
- La Luna Sangre (2017–2018)
- The Good Son (2017–2018)

== Concerts ==
| Date | Title | Venue | Country | Ref(s) |
|---|---|---|---|---|
| February 4-5, 2023 | Composer Ka Lang: 45th Anniversary Concert | The Theatre, Solaire Resort & Casino, Parañaque | Philippines | |
| February 14-15, 2023 | Composer Ka Lang: The Valentine Concert | The Theatre, Solaire Resort & Casino, Parañaque | Philippines | |

== Awards and nominations ==
| Year | Award giving body | Category | Nominated work | Results |
|---|---|---|---|---|
| 1979 | Metro Manila Popular Music Festival | | Ewan | Second Prize (with Winnie Arietta) |
| 2000 | Awit Awards | Best Musical Arrangement | Patricia's Lullabye | Won |
| 2000 | Awit Awards | Best Traditional Song | Dalagang Filipina | Won |
| 2000 | Awit Awards | Best Instrumental Performance | Patricia's Lullabye | Won |
| 2001 | Metropop Song Festival | | Pag-uwi | Grand Prize (with Joey Ayala) |
