= Unified (concert) =

2020 concert by Regine Velasquez and Sarah Geronimo

- Concert by Regine Velasquez and Sarah Geronimo
- Promotional poster for the show
- Location: Araneta Center, Quezon City, Philippines
- Venue: Araneta Coliseum
- Start date: February 14, 2020
- End date: February 15, 2020
- No. of shows: 2
Regine Velasquez concert chronology
Iconic (2019–2023)	Unified (2020)	Freedom: The Regine Velasquez-Alcasid Digital Concert (2021)
Sarah Geronimo concert chronology
This 15 Me (2018–2019)	Unified (2020)	Tala: The Film Concert (2021)

Unified was a co-headlining concert by Filipino singers Regine Velasquez and Sarah Geronimo. It was announced in December 2019 and held on two consecutive nights in February 2020 at the Araneta Coliseum in Quezon City. The show was a co-production by Viva Live and iMusic Entertainment, in partnership with the Pinoy Box Office, Tagalized Movie Channel, and K Movies Pinoy. Ticket sales were handled by TicketNet, with Colgate as a major sponsor. Raul Mitra and Louie Ocampo served as musical directors, while Paolo Valenciano was the stage director. The set list included songs taken from the singers discographies, as well as covers of various pop and OPM music.

Described as a production by two of the most powerful music artists in the Philippines, the concert was Velasquez and Geronimo's first joint venture, although they have appeared as guest acts for each other's shows in the past. Unified received positive reviews from music critics, who praised the pair's live performances and wardrobe. The production was named Concert of the Year, while Velasquez won Female Concert Performer of the Year at the Star Awards for Music. On February 26, 2021, a concert film was released via the streaming platform Vivamax.

== Background and development ==
In March 2002, Regine Velasquez presented the first season of the television singing contest Star for a Night, which was based on the British talent show of the same name. Sarah Geronimo won the competition and was signed to a management deal with Viva Records. Throughout her career, Geronimo has considered Velasquez a role model and credits her as a "mentor and inspiration", adding that Velasquez made her realize the value of hard work in pursuing a career in music. The pair has performed together in concerts, often as guest acts for each other's shows. Velasquez featured in Geronimo's Popstar: A Dream Come True (2004), The Other Side (2005), and Perfect 10 (2013). Meanwhile, Geronimo has appeared in Velasquez's Reigning Still (2004) and R3.0 (2017) concerts. On screen, they have co-starred in the superhero film Captain Barbell (2003), and Velasquez made a cameo appearance in Geronimo's family drama Unforgettable (2019).

In October 2018, Velasquez signed a network deal with ABS-CBN. In partnership with the television station, one of her first projects under the deal was hosting the musical variety show ASAP Natin' To, of which Geronimo is part of the ensemble performers. Velasquez has stated that she hoped to collaborate with Geronimo when she joins the show. On December 9, 2019, Viva Live announced through their social media accounts that the pair would be partaking in a co-headlining concert on February 14–15, 2020, at the Araneta Coliseum in Quezon City, with a show title called Unified. Raul Mitra and Louie Ocampo served as the musical directors, while Paolo Valenciano was the stage director. Tickets for the show went on sale for the general public on December 15 and was handled by TicketNet. The prices for the tickets were from ₱560 to ₱11,200. The Philippine Star reported that ticket sales grossed ₱17.5 million (US$350,000) within 24 hours of availability, asserting that it was an event by "two of the country's finest performers and biggest stars". In January 2020, additional seats were sold because of high demand.

The concert's behind the scenes special depicted the pair rehearsing with the band, the lead up to the event, and clips of fans waiting in line to show appreciation for the singers. When explaining the concept of the show, Valenciano stated that he drew inspiration from the awareness ribbon and its symbolism of solidarity and positivity. He envisioned the production design to be cohesive with the concert's title, collaborating with stage designer Enzo Pizarro, adding that "the design itself needs to communicate with our audience". The set list featured songs taken from the pair's catalog spanning the majority of their careers, and included covers of pop and OPM music. In the video, Ocampo spoke of his admiration for the pair, calling them vocally equipped and musically capable musicians. Although he acknowledged the process of choosing the songs as daunting, his objective was to pick out the finest songs from their discographies. Sushila Reyes, the vocal director, described the show as a musical treat, "It's a rare chance that you get to hear the best of their hits together, re-interpreted [and] re-invented".

Velasquez and Geronimo worked with multiple local designers for the shows' costumes, including Mak Tumang, Michael Leyva, Leo Almodal, Rajo Laurel, Neric Beltran, Edwin Tan, Jot Losa, and Nat Manilag. The pair wore blue embellished ensembles designed by Tumang and Leyva for the opening, while they donned sheer white crystal-encrusted gowns for the finale. Unified was a joint production by Viva Live and iMusic Entertainment, in partnership with media platforms Pinoy Box Office, Tagalized Movie Channel, and K Movies Pinoy; the oral hygiene brand Colgate was its major sponsor.

== Concert synopsis ==
Unified is over two hours and 30 minutes long. The concert opened with a video introduction of footage from Velasquez's and Geronimo's music videos, films, and past live performances. The pair then emerged from the upper stage and made their way down the staircases, performing "On the Wings of Love" (1982) and "Forever's Not Enough" (2003). Accompanied by dancers, the number continued with U2's Pride (In the Name of Love) (1984), which was mashed with Martin Garrix's and Bebe Rexha's "In the Name of Love" (2016), taking the latter's future bass motif and incorporating the chorus lines. They then delivered a welcome note, before playing a medley of songs from Filipino musicians Ben&Ben, Unique, and Moira Dela Torre. Geronimo leaves the stage and Velasquez sang a re-arranged version of the former's single "Isa Pang Araw". Geronimo followed this with a stripped-down rendition of Velasquez's 1990 single "Narito Ako".

The next segment opened with the duo seated centerstage performing "How Could You Say You Love Me" (2004), followed by "Dadalhin" (2002). After the number, Geronimo appeared from the upper stage surrounded by female dancers singing a medley of her dance tracks. Next, Velasquez performed the main theme of the drama series Love Thy Woman (2020). She was then joined by Geronimo and spoke briefly about the "divas of their respective generations", before transitioning into an Adele and Whitney Houston tribute number. The show continued with "Tala" (2016), which Geronimo performed as female dancers delivered a sensual choreography. Velasquez returned onstage and proceeded with "And I Am Telling You I'm Not Going" (1982), which she performed against a backdrop of deep red light beams. The final segment saw the pair perform covers of Michael Jackson's "Earth Song" (1995) and Jackie DeShannon's "What the World Needs Now Is Love" (1965). They followed with the contemporary inspirational songs "Rescue" (2019) and "Rise Up" (2015). The show concluded with an encore performance of the duo's uptempo songs "Urong Sulong" (1987) and "Sa Iyo" (2003).

== Reception and recording ==
A review by ABS-CBNnews.com praised Velasquez's and Geronimo's vocal abilities, making references to their renditions of "How Could You Say You Love Me" and "Dadalhin". It concluded: "As expected, they brought the house down by effortlessly hitting all the high notes even while sitting down." Ryan Arcadio from the Philippine Daily Inquirer commended Geronimo's performance of "Tala" for its "fierce" routine, highlighting its revamped choreography. The show's fashion also received praise. Elyse Ilagan of Metro magazine, wrote: "Sarah and Regine looked regal in lavish dresses. Embroidered to perfection, it reflected how the concert was nothing short of grand. And while it was a no brainer that people attended the show to hear Sarah and Regine sing, it wasn’t just their voices that shone through the stage."

At the 2022 Star Awards for Music, Unified was named Concert of the Year and Velasquez won Female Concert Performer of the Year. The pair also earned Best Collaboration in a Concert at the 2020 Aliw Awards. On February 26, 2021, a concert film was released via the streaming platform Vivamax.

== Set list ==
The set list is adapted from the concert film.

1. "On the Wings of Love" / "Forever's Not Enough"
2. "Pride (In the Name of Love)" / "In the Name of Love"
3. "Pagtingin" / "Sino" / "Tagu-Taguan
4. "Isa Pang Araw"
5. "Narito Ako"
6. "How Could You Say You Love Me" / "Dadalhin"
7. "Misteryo" / "Ikot-Ikot" / "Kilometro"
8. "Mahal Ko O Mahal Ako"
9. "All I Ask" / "Hello" / "Chasing Pavements"
10. "Run To You" / "Where Do Broken Hearts Go" / "I Have Nothing" / "All at Once" / "I Know Him So Well"
11. "Tala"
12. "And I Am Telling You I'm Not Going"
13. "Earth Song"
14. "What the World Needs Now Is Love"
15. "Rescue" / "Rise Up"

Encore

16. "Urong Sulong" / "Sa Iyo"

== See also ==
- List of Regine Velasquez live performances
