= Regine at the Theater =

2015 concert residency by Regine Velasquez

- Residency by Regine Velasquez
- Promotional poster for the show
- Location: Parañaque, Metro Manila, Philippines
- Venue: The Theatre at Solaire
- Start date: November 6, 2015
- End date: November 21, 2015
- Legs: 1
- No. of shows: 4

Regine Velasquez concert chronology
- Silver (2012); Regine at the Theater (2015); R3.0 (2017)

Regine at the Theater was a concert residency by Filipino recording artist Regine Velasquez at The Theatre at Solaire in Parañaque, Philippines. The residency began on November 6 and concluded on November 21, 2015, after completing four shows. The set list contained songs taken from various musicals, and featured selections from Broadway, off-Broadway and Filipino productions, including Noli Me Tángere, for which Velasquez originated the lead role of María Clara. It was exclusively promoted by iMusic Entertainment, with PLDT Inc. as sponsor. Raul Mitra served as music director, while Audie Gemora, Aicelle Santos, and Jona Viray were selected as special guests. The show was divided into two acts with an intermission. Regine at the Theater was critically appreciated, receiving praise for its theme and Velasquez's vocal abilities.

== Background and development ==
On August 21, 2015, Regine Velasquez announced through her social media account that she would perform four shows that November at The Theatre at Solaire in Parañaque, Philippines; the show would be titled Regine at the Theater. Velasquez partnered with telecommunications company PLDT Inc. and promoter iMusic Entertainment. The set on each night would be a collection of various musical themes mostly taken from Broadway and local productions, including the Filipino musical Noli Me Tángere, for which Velasquez originated the lead role of María Clara. In September, she previewed on her Instagram account portions of the songs she would perform, such as "Defying Gravity" from Wicked and "Still Hurting" from the off-Broadway musical The Last Five Years. Raul Mitra was chosen as music director for the production, while singers Audie Gemora, Aicelle Santos, and Jona Viray were selected as special guests. The concert was aired as a television special on GMA Network in 2016.

During a press conference for the concert series, Velasquez revealed that the show was initially conceived two years earlier at the suggestion of her late father, Gerry Velasquez. The project was later shelved due to scheduling conflicts. She stated that one of the reasons for the delay was her suffering from acid reflux which affected her singing. Velasquez further explained that her condition has since improved and that she can resume performing multiple shows. During rehearsals and preparation, she described the selection process as a "tedious" undertaking, saying, "We want to get the right mix [of] new songs and some expected songs and songs that I want to sing".

== Synopsis and reception ==
Throughout the four-day concert series, modified setlists were used. The concert opened with Velasquez, accompanied by a piano, singing the first verses of the show tune "I Am What I Am" from the musical La Cage aux Folles. The number continued with "The Heat Is On in Saigon" and "Singin' in the Rain" alternately mashed into the track, incorporating the chorus lines. She followed this with a performance of the West Side Story's "Somewhere". She then performed a medley of the Broadway musical themes: "I Don't Know How to Love Him" from Jesus Christ Superstar, "What I Did for Love" from A Chorus Line, and "Someone like You" from Jekyll & Hyde. Next she performed My Fair Lady's "I Could Have Danced All Night", before continuing with a medley of songs from Miss Saigon as a duet with Jona Viray, who alternated with Aicelle Santos on each weekend. She then sang the ballad "Still Hurting" from The Last Five Years and performed the hit "Halik" from the Filipino musical Rak of Aegis backed by a choir. The next segment saw Velasquez's rendition of the show tune "Tomorrow" from the musical Annie. A performance of songs from Wicked closed the first half of the show.

After an intermission, the second act opened with a performance of the title tune "The Phantom of the Opera" with Raul Mitra. This was followed by a rendition of the Sunset Boulevard track "As If We Never Said Goodbye" and "Corner of the Sky" from Pippin. The set list continued with a medley of songs from the 1995 Filipino musical Noli Me Tángere, where Velasquez was joined by Audie Gemora who starred opposite her in the production. "Fame" was performed after that, before transitioning to the Les Misérables solo "On My Own". She then performed Stephen Sondheim's "Send In the Clowns". The closing act saw Velasquez singing The Sound of Music theme "Climb Ev'ry Mountain". She returned onstage and ended the show with an encore performance of the torch songs from the musical Dreamgirls.

The concerts were met with positive responses from critics, who praised the show's theme and Velasquez's vocal abilities. Vladimir Bunoan of ABS-CBNnews.com deemed it an excellent production and commended the singer's vocal talents. He appreciated how much work went into preparing for the show. He further remarked: "Musical director Raul Mitra made sure to maximize Velasquez's vocal range with punishing arrangements and modulations such that the singer self-deprecatingly said that this is the most tiring show she has done." Bunoan concluded that, "Velasquez has always been affecting when she plays around with dynamics ... while the high notes were well applauded by her fans, [she] was actually more affecting in the quieter songs." Nerisa Almo writing for the Philippine Entertainment Portal noted that the highlights of the night, aside from the singer's vocal prowess; the dynamic between Velasquez and her fans.

== Set list ==
The set list given below was performed on November 6, 2015. The list evolved over the course of the concert residency, and sometimes included other numbers.

1. "I Am What I Am" / "The Heat Is On in Saigon" / "Singin' in the Rain"
2. "Somewhere"
3. "I Don't Know How to Love Him" / "What I Did for Love" / "Someone like You"
4. "I Could Have Danced All Night"
5. "The Movie In My Mind" / "I'd Give My Life for You" / "I Still Believe"
6. "Still Hurting"
7. "Halik"
8. "Tomorrow"
9. "For Good"
10. "Defying Gravity"
11. "The Phantom of the Opera"
12. "As If We Never Said Goodbye"
13. "Corner of the Sky"
14. "Magbalik Ka Na, Mahal" / "Awit Ni Isagani" / "Paalam Na Pag-ibig"
15. "Fame"
16. "On My Own"
17. "Send In the Clowns"
18. "Climb Ev'ry Mountain"

Encore

19. "And I Am Telling You I'm Not Going" / "One Night Only"

== Shows ==
List of concerts, showing date, city, venue, and guest act
Date	City	Venue	Guest act
November 6, 2015	Parañaque	The Theatre at Solaire	Audie Gemora; Aicelle Santos (Note: Santos and Viray alternated in the two set of weekends.); Jona Viray
November 7, 2015	Parañaque	The Theatre at Solaire	Audie Gemora; Aicelle Santos; Jona Viray
November 20, 2015	Parañaque	The Theatre at Solaire	Audie Gemora; Aicelle Santos; Jona Viray
November 21, 2015	Parañaque	The Theatre at Solaire	Audie Gemora; Aicelle Santos; Jona Viray

== See also ==
- List of Regine Velasquez live performances
