= R3.0 (concert) =

2017 concert by Regine Velasquez

- Concert by Regine Velasquez
- Promotional poster for the show
- Location: Pasay, Metro Manila, Philippines
- Venue: Mall of Asia Arena
- Start date: October 21, 2017
- End date: October 22, 2017
- No. of shows: 2

Regine Velasquez concert chronology
- Regine at the Theater (2015); R3.0 (2017); Iconic (2019–2023)

R3.0 was an arena concert by Filipino singer Regine Velasquez, held on October 21 and 22, 2017, at the Mall of Asia Arena in Pasay City. It was a part of Velasquez's promotion of her seventeenth studio album R3.0 (2017) and marked a celebration of the 30th anniversary of her professional debut in 1986. The set list featured songs predominantly taken from the album, with additional songs from her older albums and various covers of pop hits. It was exclusively promoted by Viva Live, Inc., with PLDT, Inc. as sponsor. Raul Mitra served as music director, while Paolo Valenciano was tapped as stage director.

During the two-night show, Velasquez invited several special guests, including musicians and actresses, and collaborated with numerous designers and fashion houses. The concert was acclaimed by critics, receiving praise for Velasquez's stage presence, wardrobe, and live performances. She received nominations from the Aliw Awards and Star Awards for Music for the production. The show was broadcast as a television special on February 18, 2018, airing on GMA Network.

== Background and development ==
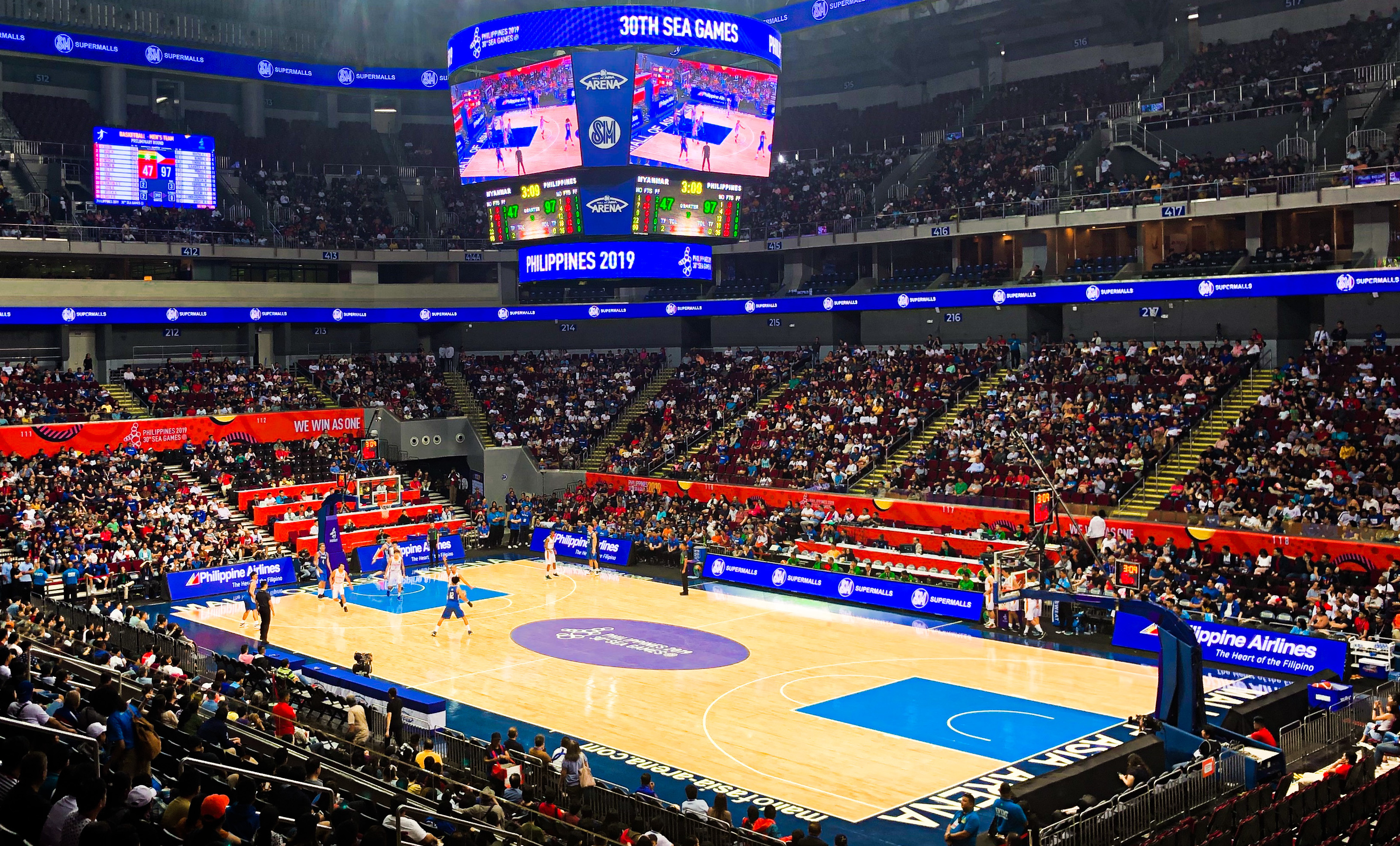
The Mall of Asia Arena in Pasay City, where the concert took place

When Regine Velasquez's record deal, with Viva Records, was announced in June 2017 by The Philippine Star, the article mentioned that the singer would perform a headlining showcase in support of the album. It was revealed that the concert, titled R3.0, would be held at the Mall of Asia Arena in Pasay on October 21 and would also celebrate the 30th anniversary of her professional debut. She has previously performed anniversary shows celebrating her 20th and 25th career milestones: Twenty staged at the Araneta Coliseum in 2006, and Silver held at the Mall of Asia Arena in 2012. Tickets for the show went on sale for the general public on July 25. The prices for the tickets were from ₱392 to ₱6,720. The date sold out in two days, which prompted a second show to be added on October 22. In August 2017, a cover of Up Dharma Down's song "Tadhana" was released as a promotional single for album, also titled R3.0. An original track, "Hugot", debuted as its lead single the following month. R3.0 was later released as a triple CD set on the opening night.

In an interview with the Philippine Daily Inquirer, Velasquez spoke in depth about the upcoming shows and described it as "exciting" and "challenging". She revealed that rehearsals and preparations made her anxious to stage another arena show because of its physical demands. Velasquez attributed it to the cancellation of her previous concert, Silver, for which she lost her voice from a viral infection. She asserted, "I have been getting lessons ... mostly to help strengthen and improve my vocal stamina. Our body changes as we get older, so does our vocal cords. Of course, I have to do promotional work, too, which involves using my voice." The concept of the shows revolve around Velasquez's career trajectory. She stated that the set for each night would be different, adding that her main objective was to deliver performances of her "signature" songs and "sweet, easy listening tunes".

Velasquez worked with multiple local designers for the shows' costumes, including Martin Bautista, Michael Leyva, Cocoy Lizaso and Cary Santiago. She wore a black feathered opera coat designed by Lizaso for the opening, while she donned an all-white ensemble designed by Leyva for the finale. The concert was promoted by Viva Live, Inc., with PLDT, Inc. as sponsor. Raul Mitra served as music director, while Paolo Valenciano was tapped as stage director. During the two-night show, Velasquez invited several special guests, including musicians Ogie Alcasid, Morissette, Mark Bautista, Sarah Geronimo, Jed Madela, Julie Anne San Jose, Angeline Quinto, Aicelle Santos, Erik Santos, and Jona Viray. It also featured a performance with actresses Mikee Cojuangco and Donna Cruz who co-starred with Velasquez in the 1996 musical comedy Do Re Mi.

== Concert synopsis ==
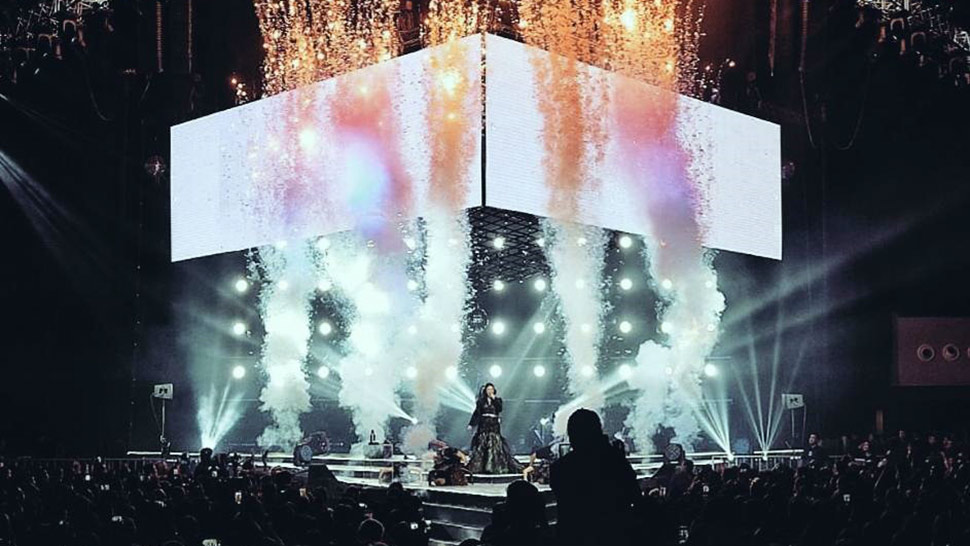
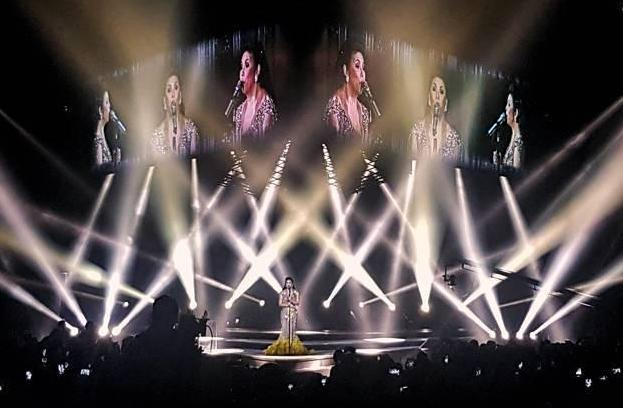
Velasquez pictured during the opening and the closing sequence of the show. During the beginning of the concert, she appeared onstage in a feathered opera coat performing a dance routine of "Call Me" (left). The finale of the show saw her centerstage singing her cover single "What Kind of Fool Am I" (right).

The concert began with a video introduction showing images of Velasquez and footage from her music videos, films, and past live performances. The LED screens were raised as Velasquez appeared onstage wearing a feathered opera coat and accompanied by background dancers. She opened the show with a cover of Blondie's "Call Me", which ended with a brief pyrotechnics. She followed with a performance of Donna Summer's "Hot Stuff", which she sang while performing the choreography. After a brief costume change, she began with a track from R3.0 titled "Tadhana", before transitioning to a medley of her duets alongside Mark Bautista, Jed Madela, and Erik Santos. "Araw Gabi" saw Velasquez walk towards the middle of the audience section as she sang to the crowd. Shortly after, she sang a medley of her OPM songs. For "I Can", she was joined by Mikee Cojuangco and Donna Cruz. The setlist continued with an Ogie Alcasid duet of her movie themes, including "Kailangan Ko'y Ikaw", "Pangako", "Sa Piling Mo", "Hanggang Ngayon" and "Pangarap Ko ay Ibigin Ka". She ended the segment with a performance of "Narito Ako".

The next segment saw Velasquez performing "Urong Sulong" as drag queens dressed in her notable gowns and ensembles moved around her. The show continued with a selection of various pop, rock, and R&B hits, including SWV's "Weak", Mariah Carey's "Butterfly", Queen's "We Will Rock You", and Beyoncé's "Single Ladies". Sarah Geronimo, joined her then to perform a medley of "Sana Maulit Muli", "Ikaw", "Dadalhin", and "Ikaw ang Lahat sa Akin". The R3.0 ballad "The First Man in My Life" was mashed with Dan Fogelberg's "Leader of the Band" and were performed on the setlist with Velasquez dedicating the songs to her late father. During Hillsong United's "Oceans", she kneeled onstage while performing the gospel song. After a brief interlude, "Go the Distance" followed. After the song ended, she bowed and thanked the audience before exiting the stage. For the encore, Velasquez returned onstage for a performance of the show tune "What Kind of Fool Am I".

== Reception ==
The concert garnered generally positive reviews from critics. Allan Policarpio from The Philippine Inquirer hailed the concert as "a night of introspection and profession of strengthened faith", praising the fact that the singer made a progress in her performances that "seemed to carry more emotional weight and vulnerability". He further remarked, "While she didn’t unleash those stratospheric notes with the same fearlessness or abandon, her power and resonance remained largely untouched. The slight rasp in her upper belts, on the other hand, added a new texture to her sound." Kara Bodegon of Billboard Philippines praised Velasquez's "vocal prowess and comedic side, basking in different genres". She wrote that the concert proved that "her legion of followers look forward to loyally sticking by her side for the next 30 years". Bodegon concluded, "She has touched many hearts in the past three decades, cutting through generations, and has proven that God-given talents are worth nurturing." Owen Maddela writing for Preview magazine commended the shows' costumes, saying, "the two-hour spectacle was its own fashion show".

For the production, Velasquez received nominations for Best Female Major Concert Act from the Aliw Awards and Female Concert Performer of the Year from the Star Awards for Music. The concert was aired as a television special on GMA Network on February 18, 2018.

== Set list ==
The set list given below was performed on October 22, 2017.

1. "Call Me"
2. "Hot Stuff"
3. "Reason Enough"
4. "Tadhana"
5. "In Love with You" / "Muli" / "Forever" / "Please Be Careful with My Heart"
6. "Araw Gabi"
7. "Kung Kailan Pa" / "Sa'yo Na Lang Ako" / "Ok Lang Ako" / "Sabihin Mo Lang"
8. "I Can"
9. "Kailangan Ko'y Ikaw" / "Pangako" / "Sa Piling Mo" / "Hanggang Ngayon" / "Pangarap Ko ay Ibigin Ka"
10. "Narito Ako"
11. "Urong Sulong"
12. "Weak" / "Butterfly" / "We Will Rock You" / "Single Ladies"
13. "Shake Your Groove Thing"
14. "Sana Maulit Muli" / "Ikaw" / "Dadalhin" / "Ikaw ang Lahat sa Akin"
15. "You'll Never Know"
16. "Leader of the Band"
17. "The First Man in My Life"
18. "Oceans"
19. "Go the Distance"

Encore

20. "What Kind of Fool Am I"

== Personnel ==
Credits and personnel are adapted from the television special R3.0. (Note: R3.0 was aired as a television special on GMA Network on February 18, 2018.)

Show

- Lilybeth G. Rasonable – executive in charge of production
- Paolo Valenciano – show direction, staging
- Louie Ignacio – television director
- Raul Mitra – musical director
- Maria Luisa Cadag – executive producer
- Darling De Jesus – supervising producer
- Ruth Roxanne Marinas – program manager
- Malou Bernardo – production manager
- Gina Quizon – assistant production manager
- Epoy Isorena – stage manager
- Marichu Ibarrientos – associate producer
- Jacob Jesuitas – assistant director
- Noel Ubico – floor director
- Zyrel Marquez – floor director
- Archie Riola – floor director
- Dominique Gallardo – lighting
- Jojo Panganiban – lighting
- Rards Corpuz – sound engineer
- Jun Bon Rustico – mixing engineer

Band

- Cesar Aguas – guitars
- Noel Mendoza – guitars
- Juan Miguel Rivera – keyboards
- Michael Asher Alba – bass
- Emmanuel Florendo – bass
- Romeo Pacana – bass
- Anthony Cailao – background vocalist
- Miriam Cynthia Marquez – background vocalist
- Samuel Gaddi – background vocalist
- Zebedee Zuñiga – background vocalist
- Dorothy Galvez – background vocalist
- Jenny Garcia – background vocalist
- Rose Marielle Mamaclay – background vocalist
- Kenneth Mendez – background vocalist
- Jun Ochoa – background vocalist

== See also ==
- List of Regine Velasquez live performances
