= Sana Maulit Muli =

Sana Maulit Muli may refer to:

- Sana Maulit Muli (film), a 1995 Filipino romantic drama film starring Lea Salonga and Aga Muhlach.
- Sana Maulit Muli (song), a 1988 single by Gary Valenciano.
- Sana Maulit Muli (TV series), a 2007 Philippine primetime soap opera aired on ABS-CBN.
