= Leo Almodal =

Filipino fashion designer

- Born: January 19, 1983 (age 43); Mandaue, Cebu, Philippines
- Education: University of Cebu (BEEd)
- Occupation: Fashion designer
- Website: almodal.com

Leo Almodal is a Filipino fashion designer based in Pasig. His fashion line is called Almodal.

== Early life and education ==
Leo Almodal was born in the Philippines. He took a degree in elementary education, majoring in English, graduating in 2000 magna cum laude.

Almodal discovered his artistic inclination at the age of six, first sketching an image of the Virgin Mary and later drawing Disney princesses—early inspirations that shaped his creative journey.

== Career ==
Almodal is the creative director and fashion designer of the fashion brand ALMODAL. The business is based in Pasig City, Manila.

== Notable clients ==
Actress Ara Mina wore an Almodal wedding gown for her wedding on June 30, 2021.

Anne Curtis wore a Almodal design for her comeback concert on June 11, 2022.

Other clients of his couture include Miss International Philippines 2022, Nicole Borromeo, and Miss Globe Philippines 2022, Chelsea Fernandez, on the coronation night of Binibining Pilipinas held May 28, 2023.

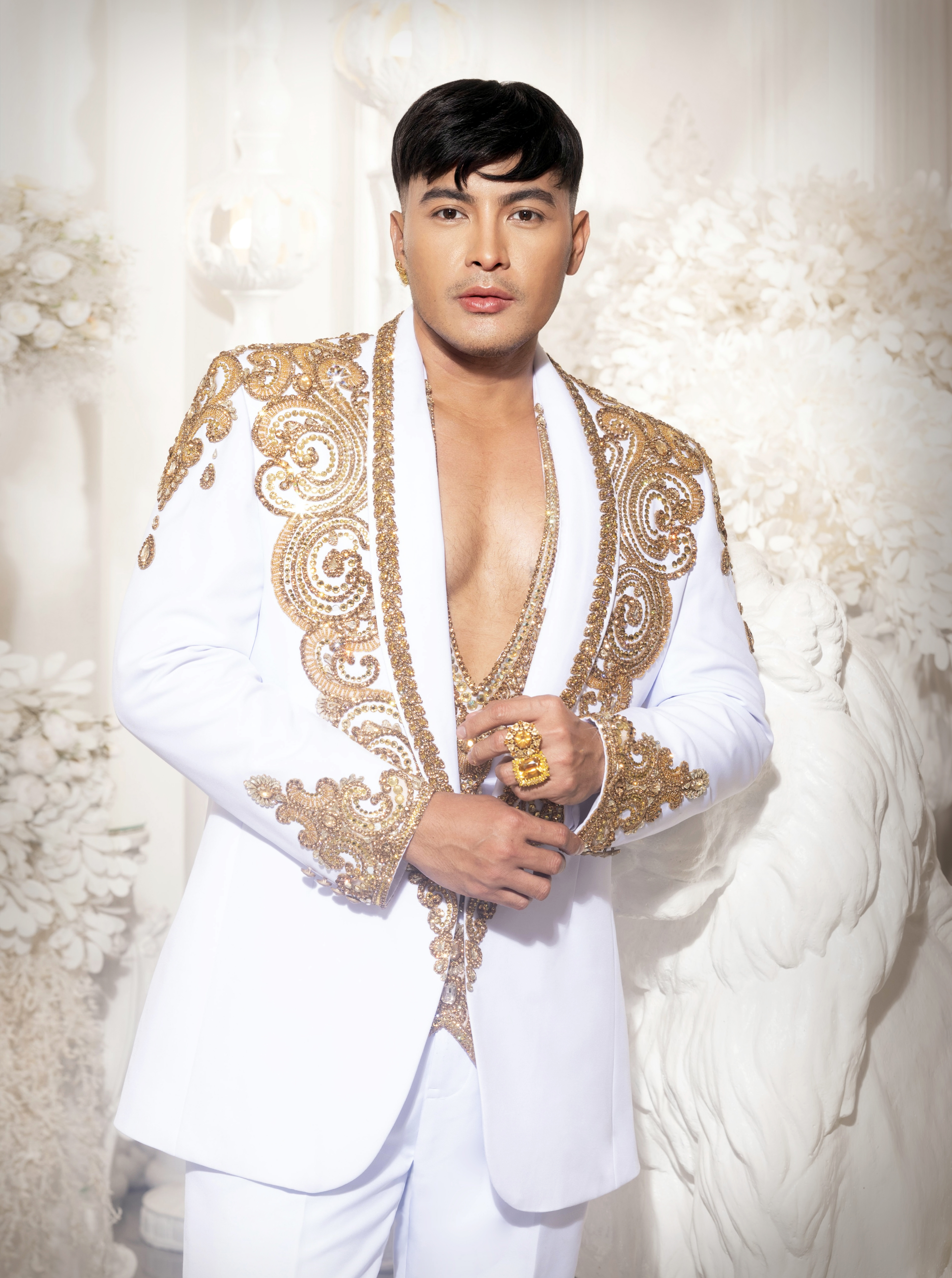
Baroque Gold couture ensemble showcasing refined craftsmanship and sophistication.

Sharon Cuneta and Regine Velasquez shared the stage in Iconic wearing gowns designed by Almodal.

== Fashion shows ==
In the first solo runway presentation, Welcome to My World (2024, Philippines), Almodal presented themed collections inspired by the sun, Philippine biodiversity, and fairy tales. The show emphasized empowerment through couture and highlighted a fusion of fashion and jewelry design. Almodal also debuted his gown collections during the Paris Fashion Week last 2024.
