= Hulog Ka ng Langit =

Studio album by Regine Velasquez-Alcasid
- Released: November 28, 2013
- Recorded: December 24, 2012–August 16, 2013
- Studio: Walker Street Recording Studio
- Genre: Pop
- Length: 69:32 (Standard edition); 72:34 (Deluxe edition)
- Language: English; Tagalog
- Label: Universal
- Producer: Kathleen Dy Go (executive); Regine Velasquez-Alcasid (producer); Ito Rapadas (associate); Diana Velasquez-Roque (associate)

Regine Velasquez-Alcasid chronology
Low Key and Fantasy Collection (2013)	Hulog Ka ng Langit (2013)	R3.0 (2017)

Singles from Hulog Ka ng Langit
- 1. "Hulog Ka ng Langit" Released: October 8, 2013; 2. "Sa'yo Na Lang Ako" Released: January 26, 2014

Hulog Ka ng Langit is the sixteenth studio album by Filipina singer Regine Velasquez-Alcasid, released in the Philippines on November 28, 2013, by Universal Records. It is her third and final full-length studio album under the record label following Fantasy from the year 2010. It is an album that consists of original songs and remakes that centers on motherhood and unconditional love. This album was dedicated to her only son Nathaniel James Alcasid. The album debuted at number one in all record bars in the Philippines and was certified Platinum in two weeks after its official release.

== Background ==
Velasquez married long-time partner, the Filipino singer-songwriter Ogie Alcasid in 2010 and eventually got pregnant causing her to cancel all existing professional commitments. She took a year-long hiatus for her sensitive pregnancy and thus, it took a few years before she could go back to the studio to record a full-length album. The making of the album had to be delayed due to the preparations for her 25th anniversary concert Silver in November 2012. Velasquez was also having difficulties coming back to singing after pregnancy due to the weight, she gained during pregnancy and the problems she encountered with her singing voice which was later attributed to acid reflux. Sometime in early 2013, Velasquez began recording some of the songs for the new album.

== Creation and composition ==
Hulog Ka ng Langit ("Heaven Sent") is a complete departure from Velasquez's previous album, Fantasy in 2010. She was known for records which centers on hopeless romantic love that is showcased through melancholic love songs, catchy pop hits and power ballads, packaged with her signature glamour. In this album, she kept intricate vocal styling at a minimum and focused on straightforward delivery instead. This record centers on being a tribute that is dedicated to her son, composed of lighthearted, heartwarming songs for mothers and children plus a line-up of a few love songs, old and new by various songwriters from the country and overseas, providing an inspirational vibe. As the debut single and title track of the album, "Hulog Ka ng Langit" embodies what the album is all about – unconditional love between husbands and wives and mothers to children. These are songs of love treated with sparkling arrangements by respected names in local music, who've all been part of Velasquez's career for the past several years. It is their work that keeps the upbeat mood throughout the album. There may be a hint of melancholy in some songs but the album exhibits the happy and blissful state where Velasquez is in her life now. Her singing is blithe and her musicians just went along. The idea of recording a baby album as they say came up from Velasquez herself. "I am a mommy and I thought it'll be nice to dedicate a whole album for my son. I waited for him for so long. 'Hulog Ka ng Langit' is actually not just for babies and mothers. The album also has a lot of love songs which listeners can dedicate to their loved ones", Velasquez shared. She recounts that when work has started for the album, the whole team was leaning towards making a niche baby album. She felt that love songs that have more general messages have to be included in the album to capture a wider market. "The challenge really was to have a special, not-so-typical baby album", shares Velasquez. "An album that can be appreciated by everyone – kids, parents, lovers, and family."

== Production and recording ==
Velasquez considers Hulog Ka ng Langit as the most memorable album she has ever made due to the fact that the album is a product of her love for her son and family. She explained "This is an album that can be appreciated by everyone – kids, parents, lovers, and family."

Recording was a long, tedious process. She explained that she was having a hard time going back to singing after giving birth, gaining and losing significant weight followed by the diagnosis of Acid Reflux around the time she was recording. The album took 9 months to finalize all the recording of vocals and finishing touches. She also added some candid soundbites of her son and herself in some songs which gives off a natural atmosphere and showcases the bond between mother and son. Her son's presence and participation is felt all throughout. The soundbites are taken from posted videos of Velasquez in her Instagram account.

== Packaging ==
The album features a slipcase covered by a portrait of Velasquez's face captured by the ace lens man Mark Nicdao. Inside is a colorful 40-page mini baby scrapbook featuring the pictures of her new family and her son Nate documented in Velasquez's Instagram account and compiled into the album with the lyrics of the songs.

== Marketing and promotion ==
Velasquez's first promotional appearance where she sang the carrier single of the album is in the local weekly musical/variety show Sunday All Stars on September 7, 2013. The album was initially pushed back from the month of September to October so that more recording in the studio could take place and was later revealed that the release was to be pushed back once more to November 16, 2013 with all promotion being delayed so that Velasquez could put finishing touches to the album.

The album was promoted in a series of mall shows. The "Regine Velasquez Alcasid Hulog Ka ng Langit Album Tour" started on November 16, 2013 taking place in different malls around the metro followed by provincial tour schedules. The album was initially available only in the mall shows and was made officially available nationwide on November 28, 2013.

The album was officially launched on Velasquez' musical-variety show Sunday All Stars on December 1, 2013. She performed the carrier single "Hulog Ka ng Langit" live and the songs "Amazing" with Rachelle Ann Go and "God Gave Me You" with Frencheska Farr.

== Commercial performance ==
Without the promotional blitz and the album not being available nationwide just yet, Hulog Ka ng Langit debuted at the number-one spot in all leading record charts in the Philippines. It became number 1 in all Astrovision/Astroplus and in Odyssey outlets for November 11–17, 2013 topping Karylle's K in OPM (local) Category and Lady Gaga's Artpop in Overall (local and foreign) Category. The album stayed at number 1 for three consecutive weeks.

Just a week after the album's TV launch in Sunday All Stars, Hulog Ka ng Langit certified Platinum within 2 weeks upon official nationwide release. The album was awarded on the December 8, 2013 episode of Sunday All Stars where Velasquez sang the Gary Valenciano original Filipino song "Hele ni Inay", a cut from the album.

== Track listing ==
Standard edition
No.	Title	Writer(s)	Arranger(s)	Length
1.	"Hulog Ka ng Langit"	Aaron Paul del Rosario	Mon Faustino	4:00
2.	"Rainbow Connection"	Paul Williams; Kenneth Ascher	Bond Samson	3:55
3.	"Amazing"	Christopher Paul Janz	Bobby Velasco	4:41
4.	"My Child"	Del Rosario	Marc Lopez	4:33
5.	"Pag-ibig"	Danny Javier	Jimmy Antiporda	3:38
6.	"Tomorrow"	Charles Strouse; Martin Charnin	Nino Regalado	2:59
7.	"Someone's Waiting for You"	Ayu Robbins; Carol Connors; Sammy Fain	Regalado	2:29
8.	"Araw, Ulap, Langit"	Marlon Barnuevo	Raul Mitra	4:32
9.	"Just the Way You Are" (with Ogie Alcasid)	Bruno Mars; Philip Lawrence; Ari Levine; Khalil Walton; Khari Cain	Velasco	3:51
10.	"Nathaniel (Gift of God)"	Jude Gitamondoc	Homer Flores	4:56
11.	"The One Real Thing"	Trina Belamide	Faustino	4:34
12.	"Happiness"	Clark Gesner	Mitra	3:15
13.	"Hele ni Inay"	Roy del Valle; Lisa Tayko	Flores	4:46
14.	"You"	Randy Edelman	Mitra	3:51
15.	"Sa'yo Na Lang Ako"	Lara Maigue	Noel Mendez	5:25
16.	"You Got It"	Jeff Lynne; Roy Orbison; Tom Petty	Regalado	3:40
17.	"God Gave Me You"	Andy Goldmark; Jamie Houston–Hicks	Mitra	4:20
Total length:				69:32

Deluxe edition bonus track
No.	Title	Writer(s)	Length
18.	"Believing in Me" (Gabay Guro tribute song for the teacher)	Ogie Alcasid	3:02
Total length:			72:34

== Personnel ==
- Regine Velasquez – vocals, background vocals, album producer, make up artist
- Kathleen Dy-Go – executive producer
- Ito Rapadas – associate producer, instrumental recording supervision, additional string arrangement
- Diana Velasquez-Roque – associate producer
- Deca Velasquez-Pineda – production assistant
- Ogie Alcasid – guest vocals
- Nathaniel James Velasquez Alcasid – soundbites
- Xerie Tan and Velvet Strings – violin and viola tracks
- Nino Regalado – arranger, live drum tracks
- Willy Villa – sound engineer
- Cris Buenviaje – sound engineer
- Jay Saturnino D. Lumboy – album concept and lay out
- Anne Kate Pinero – slip case cover
- Mark Nicdao – photography
- Veronica Gonzales – fashion stylist
- Francis Saran – hair stylist

== Certifications ==
Region	Certification	Certified units/sales
Philippines (PARI)	Platinum	15,000^{*}
^{*} Sales figures based on certification alone.

== Release history ==
Region	Release date	Label	Edition	Catalogue
Worldwide	November 20, 2013	Universal Records Philippines	Deluxe (Digital download + bonus track via iTunes)	
Philippines	November 28, 2013	Universal Records Philippines	Standard (CD)	CDP-94,1548
