= R3.0 =

- 3 disc box-set edition artwork

Studio album by Regine Velasquez-Alcasid
- Released: October 21, 2017
- Recorded: May–October 2017
- Studios: Walker Recording Studio (Velasquez-Alcasid's home studio) (Quezon City); Amerasian studio (Manila)
- Genres: Pop; OPM
- Length: 36:57 (Renditions - disc 1); 43:13 (Rise - disc 2); 46:09 (Reflections - disc 3)
- Languages: English, Filipino
- Label: Viva
- Producers: Regine Velasquez-Alcasid (also exec.); Vic del Rosario Jr.; Tony M. Ocampo; Vincent del Rosario; MG M. Mozo; Baby A. Gil; Diana Velasquez-Roque; Guia Gil Ferrer

Regine Velasquez-Alcasid chronology
Hulog Ka ng Langit (2013)	R3.0 (2017)	Reginified (2024)

Singles from R3.0
- 1. "Tadhana" Released: August 25, 2017; 2. "Hugot" Released: September 22, 2017

R3.0 is the seventeenth studio album by Filipino singer Regine Velasquez-Alcasid. It was released in the Philippines on October 21, 2017, by Viva Records. It is Velasquez' comeback album under the record label after parting ways with Viva in 2007 and released coincide her 30th anniversary concert held at Mall of Asia Arena. The album was certified Platinum by PARI with sales of 15,000 physical CD copies and digital album copies sold. The album consists of 30 songs. Velasquez worked on the album in less than a year, co-producing it with various musicians. She regularly uploaded pictures of her recording sessions on her Instagram account.

Thematically, R3.0 represents the singer's artistry and way of celebrating her 30th anniversary in the business. The 3-disc album are separated into three titles called Renditions, features covers from other artists that impacted her singing career the most, Rise, which features new original songs and Reflections, which consists of re-recorded songs that Velasquez released in the past.

R3.0 reached number one on iTunes Philippines and achieved Platinum Record Award, after six weeks of its official release.

== Track listing ==
Credits adapted from the liner notes of R3.0.

Renditions – Disc one
No.	Title	Writer(s)	Arranger(s)	Length
1.	"Tadhana"	UP Dharma Down	Raul Mitra	3:54
2.	"Bakit Ako Mahihiya"	Pablo Vergara	Bond Samson	4:23
3.	"If You Go Away"	Jacques Brel; Rod McKuen	Mitra	4:43
4.	"Sometime, Somewhere"	Ryan Cayabyab	Homer Flores	6:17
5.	"(Where Do I Begin) Love Story"	Francis Lai; Carl Sigman	Louie Ocampo	5:10
6.	"The Greatest Love of All"	Michael Masser; Linda Creed	Mon Faustino	5:25
7.	"The Warrior Is a Child"	Twila Paris	Mitra	4:03
8.	"Go the Distance"	Michael Bolton	Marc Lopez	5:26
9.	"Oceans"	Joel Houston; Matt Crocker; Salomon Lighthelm	Jem Florendo	4:59
10.	"Usahay"	Gregorio Labja	Mitra	3:48
Total length:				36:57

Rise – Disc two
No.	Title	Writer(s)	Arranger(s)	Length
1.	"Higher"	Jimmy Borja; Lisa Aschman; Deanna Loveland	Nikko Rivera	3:32
2.	"Hugot"	Miguel Mendoza	Gino Cruz	4:08
3.	"Skybound"	Maniell Dulay	Cruz	3:27
4.	"Prove to You"	Ruth Anna Mendoza	Florendo	3:08
5.	"Dream Away"	Jimmy Antiporda	Antiporda	4:18
6.	"Underrated"	Borja	Rivera	3:38
7.	"Walang Hanggang Ikaw"	Jungee Marcelo	Cezar Aguas	3:43
8.	"Say Goodbye"	Lara Maigue	Flores	3:58
9.	"Taking Flight"	Rox Santos	Florendo	4:06
10.	"First Man in My Life"	Ogie Alcasid	Ria Villena Osorio	4:18
Total length:				43:13

Reflections – Disc three
No.	Title	Writer(s)	Arranger(s)	Length
1.	"You Are My Song"	Louie Ocampo; Martin Nievera	Mitra	3:48
2.	"Araw Gabi"	Cayabyab	Ric Mercado	4:42
3.	"Dadalhin"	Tats Faustino	Aguas	5:38
4.	"Tanging Mahal"	Girl Valencia	Arnold Buena	4:35
5.	"Hindi Na, Ayoko Na"	Mon Faustino	Buena	4:43
6.	"I Have to Say Goodbye"	Alcasid	Lopez	4:43
7.	"On the Wings of Love"	Peter Harrison Schless; Jeffrey Osborne	Mitra	5:55
8.	"Isang Lahi"	Vehnee Saturno	Niño Regalado	4:14
9.	"Kung Maibabalik Ko Lang"	Christine Bendebel	Faustino	4:29
10.	"I Can" (featuring Nate Alcasid)	Ocampo; Edith Gallardo	Ocampo	2:58
Total length:				46:09

== Personnel ==
The following people are credited on the album:

Managerial

- Regine Velasquez-Alcasid – executive and album producer
- Vic del Rosario – executive producer
- Tony M. Ocampo – executive producer
- Vincent del Rosario – executive producer
- MG O. Mozo – supervising producer
- Baby A. Gil – supervising producer
- Diana Velasquez-Roque – associate producer
- Guia Gil-Ferrer – associate producer
- Civ Fontanilla - A&R direction
- Yen Barrette - A&R coordination

Performance credits

- Regine Velasquez-Alcasid –vocals, background vocals, background vocal arrangement
- Nate Alcasid – guest vocals
- Raul Mitra – background vocal arrangement
- Suy Galvez – background vocals
- Gail Blanco – background vocals
- Riva Ferrer-Jose – background vocals arrangement
- JC Jose – background vocals
- Tommy Virtucio – background vocals

Visuals and imagery

- Mark Nicdao – photography
- Cacai Velasquez-Mitra – art director
- Anna Paulino – layout and design
- Veron Gonzalez – stylist
- Raj Rivera – stylist
- Martin Bautista – wardrobe
- Cheetah Rivera – wardrobe
- Edwin Tan – wardrobe
- UNIQLO – wardrobe
- Jonathan Velasco – hairstylist
- Regine Velasquez-Alcasid – makeup artist

Instruments, Technical and Production

- Janno Queyquep – guitar, ukulele
- Chino David – violin
- Ted Amper – cello
- Joel Mendoza – mastering, mixing, recording engineer
- Cris Buenviaje – recording engineer
- Ponz Martinez – recording engineer

== Certifications ==
Region	Certification	Certified units/sales
Philippines (PARI)	Platinum	15,000^{*}
^{*} Sales figures based on certification alone.

== Release history ==
Region	Release date	Format	Edition	Label	Catalogue	Ref.
Philippines	October 21, 2017	CD	Standard	Viva	VR 3CD 17 001	
Worldwide	October 21, 2017	Digital download	Standard	Viva		
