= Iconic (tour) =

2019–23 tour by Sharon Cuneta and Regine Velasquez

- Tour by Sharon Cuneta and Regine Velasquez
- Promotional poster for the tour
- Location: Asia; North America
- Start date: October 18, 2019
- End date: March 26, 2023
- Legs: 4
- No. of shows: 16
Sharon Cuneta concert chronology
Sharon: My 40 Years (2018)	Iconic (2019–2023)	Love Sharon (2022)
Regine Velasquez concert chronology
R3.0 (2017)	Iconic (2019–2023)	Unified (2020)

Iconic was a co-headlining concert tour by Filipino singers Sharon Cuneta and Regine Velasquez. Comprising 16 shows, it began on October 18, 2019, at the Araneta Coliseum in Manila, and concluded on March 26, 2023, in Los Angeles. The tour in the United States was due to begin May 2020 with six dates scheduled, but these were postponed following the outbreak of the COVID-19 pandemic; new shows were announced after a two-year delay. It continued in June 2022 at the Resorts World Manila, followed by a series of shows in the United States throughout 2023. The concert tour featured guest appearances by Pilita Corrales, Jeremy Glinoga, and Zephanie Dimaranan.

Described as a production of "two unrivaled names in the music scene", the tour was Cuneta and Velasquez's first joint venture after the latter signed a deal with ABS-CBN in October 2018. It was inspired by their desire to perform each other's material from their early works, since they believe these would unite their different musical audiences. The set list included songs taken from the singers' discographies, as well as additional cover songs. The pair promoted the show extensively through television appearances and social media. Critics generally lauded the tour, praising the repertoire and both artists' chemistry and performance abilities. For their work, both singers earned an Aliw Award for Best Collaboration in a Concert in 2019, while Velasquez was named Female Concert Performer of the Year at the Star Awards for Music in 2021.

== Background and development ==
Regine Velasquez's music was influenced by singer and actress Sharon Cuneta early in her career. She has been vocal of her admiration of Cuneta, who she cites as one of her musical inspirations and most revered idols. Since her childhood, Velasquez has considered Cuneta a role model and credits her as a key inspiration in pursuing music. Velasquez remarked, "I've always idolized her ever since. The first song I memorized was "Mr. DJ". So, I have a [standard] Sharon Cuneta medley, and I've even seen most of her movies in the cinema." The pair first met in the late 1980s, and have often performed in various events and concerts with other acts. In June 2018, Cuneta stated that she hoped to collaborate with Velasquez for a concert. That October, Velasquez signed a deal with Philippine television network ABS-CBN. In partnership with the network, one of her first projects under the deal was a concert series, Regine at the Movies, for which Cuneta made a guest appearance.

On July 17, 2019, Cuneta announced through the Philippine Daily Inquirer and her social media accounts that the pair would be partaking in a concert in October, which she described as a "love project". In August, it was revealed that a two-night show would be held on October 18–19, at the Araneta Coliseum in Quezon City, with a show titled Iconic. Louie Ocampo and Raul Mitra were chosen as the music directors, while Rowell Santiago served as the stage director. These first shows included appearances by Zephanie Dimaranan and Jeremy Glinoga as supporting acts. Tickets for the show went on sale for the general public on August 10, and the prices ranged from ₱560 to ₱11,200.

The Daily Tribune reported that the show had a total of 19 production numbers and a running time of two and half hours, writing that it was an event of "two unrivaled names in the music scene", which will feature the pair performing each other's songs. When explaining the concept and title of the concert in an interview with the Manila Times, Cuneta asserted, "I think we've earned our places in show business ... modesty aside, the word 'icon' should not be used very lightly. You should use it for certain people ... there's a meaning to the word." The goal of the show was to bring two different groups of fans and music enthusiasts together, "It's not a showdown ... our fans, when they come, they keep in mind that it's a collaboration", she said.

Following the two-night show in Manila, it was confirmed that a concert tour was due to begin in May 2020, visiting six venues around the United States. However, the US was being impacted by the COVID-19 pandemic, imposing social restrictions that led to the cancellation of music events; no new dates were announced at the time. On March 4, 2022, News.ABS-CBN.com reported that Iconic was scheduled to be re-staged in Manila on June 17–18, at the Marriott Grand Ballroom of Resorts World Manila, with Pilita Corrales announced as a special guest. On June 16, 2022, a behind the scenes video was released which previewed rehearsals and the press conference for the show. The North American tour was then rescheduled to begin in July 2022. It kicked off on July 9 in Lincoln, California at the Thunder Valley Casino Resort. The following year, a second North American leg commenced in March 2023, adding six shows which concluded in Los Angeles.

== Promotion ==
In addition to online promotion, Cuneta and Velasquez made many appearances on television. They performed at variety shows, including ASAP Natin 'To, Gandang Gabi, Vice!, and It's Showtime. On November 6, 2019, the first part of the concert's behind-the-scenes video detailing the event premiered via Cuneta's YouTube channel. It showed rehearsals and preparations for the show and a snippet of her performing "Sana'y Wala Nang Wakas". In it, Cuneta stated that she is excited, yet nervous about the shows. She said, "Its two different styles coming together ... It's like apples and oranges. When you put them together should make a very curious but beautiful combination." Music director Louie Ocampo said that the process of selecting songs from both singers' extensive catalogue was a daunting task. The second behind-the-scenes video was released two weeks later, on November 22, 2019. During the video, Ocampo spoke of his admiration for the pair, highlighting that they are both grounded and straightforward.

== Synopsis and reception ==
The concert opened with an overture rendition of "Pangarap na Bituin". At the conclusion of the instrumental introduction, Velasquez descended down the stairs singing the first verses of the song. Cuneta then appeared onstage and followed with the second verse, before the pair continued performing the song as a duet. The duo then performed "You Are My Song" as the second number during the set. Velasquez then spoke briefly about the first song she memorized as a child, "Mr. DJ", before the pair began with the song and a medley of the Cuneta's movie theme songs. Cuneta leaves the stage and Velasquez sang a re-arranged version of her single "Dadalhin" followed by a cover of Cuneta's hit "Sinasamba Kita". As Velasquez left the stage, Cuneta began with "To Love Again" and transitioned to her cover of the former's song "Kailangan Ko'y Ikaw".

The next segment opened with the duo singing a medley of the Ogie Alcasid-penned soundtrack themes of Velasquez's films: "Paano Kita Iibigin", "Pangako", and "Pangarap Ko ang Ibigin Ka". The pair then sat centerstage and sang "Kahit Maputi na ang Buhok Ko", before performing Velasquez's covers of Ryan Cayabyab's songs, "Araw Gabi" and "Tuwing Umuulan". A medley of the duo's uptempo songs "Swing" and "Urong Sulong" were then performed, followed by a duet of Moira Dela Torre's "Kung Di Rin Lang Ikaw". A cover of The Juans's "Istorya" was then sung by Velasquez, followed by Cuneta's rendition of Juan Karlos Labajo's "Buwan". The final segment saw the pair singing "Bituing Walang Ningning", which was then followed by a mashup of "Narito Ako" and "Sana’y Wala nang Wakas". After the performance, the pair thanked the audience before exiting the stage. For the encore, the duo sang the love ballad "Ikaw", and then closed the show with a medley of 1980s music.

The concert tour was met with positive responses from critics. In a review of the opening night, Leah Salterio writing for News.ABS-CBN.com deemed it an emotional show and described it as a "trip down memory lane". She commended the pair's palpable chemistry and united performance. Salterio concluded, "Two hours will never be enough to squeeze in all the memorable hits of the two superstar singers in just one concert, performed in only one stage." The following concerts for the duration of the tour were also met with high praise: Rito Asilo of the Philippine Daily Inquirer lauded the June 2022 production at the Resorts Word Manila for showcasing "entertainment" and "nostalgia", and opined that each entertainer gave the other the opportunity to be the center of attention, while acknowledging their different types of success. He complimented Velasquez's unrivaled "technique and mastery of her voice", while he appreciated Cuneta's performances that "brings out the heart and soul of any song she sings". For the joint venture, the pair won Best Collaboration in a Concert at the 2019 Aliw Awards. At the 2021 Star Awards for Music, the tour received a nomination in the category for Concert of the Year, while Velasquez was named Female Concert Performer of the Year.

== Set list ==
The set list given below was performed on October 18, 2019.

1. "Pangarap na Bituin"
2. "You Are My Song"
3. "Mr. DJ" / "High School Life" / "P.S. I Love You" / "Dear Heart"
4. "Dadalhin"
5. "Sinasamba Kita"
6. "To Love Again"
7. "Kailangan Ko'y Ikaw"
8. "Paano Kita Iibigin" / "Pangako" / "Pangarap Ko ang Ibigin Ka"
9. "Kahit Maputi na ang Buhok Ko"
10. "Araw Gabi" / "Tuwing Umuulan"
11. "Swing" / "Urong Sulong"
12. "Kung Di Rin Lang Ikaw"
13. "Istorya"
14. "Buwan"
15. "Istorya"
16. "Bituing Walang Ningning"
17. "Narito Ako" / "Sana’y Wala nang Wakas"

Encore

18. "Ikaw"
19. "Breakout" / "Into the Groove / "I Wanna Dance with Somebody (Who Loves Me)" / "Gloria" / "No More Tears (Enough Is Enough)" / "I'm So Excited"

== Shows ==
List of concerts, showing date, city, country, and venue
Date	City	Country	Venue
Leg 1 — Asia
October 18, 2019	Manila	Philippines	Araneta Coliseum
October 19, 2019	Manila	Philippines	Araneta Coliseum
Leg 2 — Asia
June 17, 2022	Manila	Philippines	Resorts World Manila
June 18, 2022	Manila	Philippines	Resorts World Manila
Leg 3 — North America
July 9, 2022	Lincoln	United States	Thunder Valley Casino Resort
July 15, 2022	Chicago	United States	Copernicus Theater
July 16, 2022	Newark	United States	Newark Symphony Hall
July 17, 2022	Pasadena	United States	Pasadena Civic Auditorium
July 22, 2022	Temecula	United States	Pechanga Resort & Casino
July 23, 2022	Temecula	United States	Pechanga Resort & Casino
July 24, 2022	Seattle	United States	Benaroya Hall
Leg 4 — North America
March 17, 2023	San Jose	United States	San Jose Civic Center
March 18, 2023	Santa Ynez	United States	Chumash Casino Resort
March 19, 2023	Temecula	United States	Pechanga Resort & Casino
March 24, 2023	Las Vegas	United States	Central Church
March 26, 2023	Los Angeles	United States	Saban Theatre

== Cancelled shows ==
List of cancelled concerts, showing date, city, country, venue, and reason for cancellation
Date	City	Country	Reason
May 16, 2020	New York City	United States	COVID-19 pandemic
May 17, 2020	Washington, D.C.	United States	COVID-19 pandemic
May 23, 2020	Pasadena	United States	COVID-19 pandemic
May 24, 2020	Las Vegas	United States	COVID-19 pandemic
May 29, 2020	Santa Ynez	United States	COVID-19 pandemic
May 30, 2020	Lincoln	United States	COVID-19 pandemic

== See also ==
- List of Regine Velasquez live performances
