= Noli Me Tángere (musical) =

1995 musical based on José Rizal's novel of the same name

- Music: Ryan Cayabyab
- Lyrics: Bienvenido Lumbera
- Book: Bienvenido Lumbera
- Basis: Noli Me Tángere by José Rizal
- Premiere: 1995: Cultural Center of the Philippines, Manila

Noli Me Tángere, also known as Noli Me Tángere: The Musical, is a Filipino musical based on José Rizal's novel of the same name, with music by Ryan Cayabyab and libretto by Bienvenido Lumbera. Directed by Nonon Padilla, the musical premiered in 1995 at the Cultural Center of the Philippines (CCP) in Manila.

== Production history ==
The musical was produced after the success of Cayabyab's previous Rizal musical adaptation, El filibusterismo (1993). The musical was written by Ryan Cayabyab and Bienvenido Lumbera. It premiered in 1995 at the Cultural Center of the Philippines (CCP) in Manila and was directed by Nonon Padilla.

Since its original production, Noli Me Tángere has been restaged multiple times, including revivals in Manila in 2005 and 2011, Los Angeles, California in 2014, and Honolulu, Hawaii in 2018. It also toured in Japan and Malaysia.

The 2011 revival production, held to commemorate the 150th anniversary of Rizal's birth, was co-presented by the Cultural Center of the Philippines and the National Historical Commission of the Philippines. It ran at the CCP Tanghalang Aurelio Tolentino in Manila from August 5 through August 28, 2011. The set was designed by Salvador Bernal.

== Casts ==
Character	Original cast 1995	1st CCP Revival 2005	2nd CCP Revival 2011
Crisóstomo Ibarra	Audie Gemora / John Arcilla	Jon Joven / Arnold Reyes	Mark Bautista / Gian Magdangal
María Clara	Regine Velasquez / Monique Wilson / Gigi Posadas (1996)	Angeli Bayani / Lena McKenzie / Princess Virtudazo	Cris Villonco
Padre Dámaso	Bernardo Bernardo / Bodjie Pascua	Dodo Crisol / Rody Vera	Bodjie Pascua / Red Nuestro
Doña Victorina	Nanette Inventor / Sheila Francisco		Aireen Antonio
Kapitan Tiago		Bong Imbile / Red Nuestro	Red Nuestro
Padre Salvi			Al Gatmaitan
Sisa			Angeli Bayani
Elias			Jerald Napoles

== Television film ==
A television film adaptation of the musical was broadcast on December 30, 1995, on RPN (now CNN Philippines). Produced by the Film Development Foundation and directed by Jose Mari Avellana, it features Ariel Rivera and Monique Wilson in the respective roles of Crisóstomo Ibarra and María Clara; Audie Gemora, who originally played Ibarra on stage, agreed to play the role of Father Salvi instead.
