= Reginified =

Studio album by Regine Velasquez
- Released: November 22, 2024
- Length: 54:57
- Label: Star Music
- Producers: Jonathan Manalo; Regine Velasquez

Regine Velasquez chronology
R3.0 (2017)	Reginified (2024)

Singles from Reginified
- 1. "It Must Have Been Love" Released: October 13, 2023; 2. "The Only Exception" Released: July 26, 2024; 3. "'Di Sinasadya" Released: August 23, 2024; 4. "Someday" Released: September 27, 2024; 5. "Wherever You Are" Released: November 8, 2024; 6. "Crazy for You" Released: April 11, 2025

Reginified is the eighteenth studio album by Filipino singer Regine Velasquez. It was released on November 22, 2024, by Star Music. It features remakes of songs she performed in previous concerts and televised appearances. This album also marks her debut full-length release under the Star Music label.

The album's first single, a cover of Roxette's "It Must Have Been Love" was released on October 13, 2023. Its second single, a cover of Paramore's "The Only Exception", was released on July 26, 2024.

== Background ==
Velasquez first teased the release of the new album through a live stream on social media site TikTok on May 16, 2023, alongside her other music projects for that year. She teased that the tracks of that album will feature songs that she previously sung in her different concerts, or the songs she has previously performed on the Sunday noontime variety show ASAP. At the same time, she expressed thanks to her fans, who gave the idea for the title of the new album. She said in the livestream that the title and term Reginified came from her fans.

== Release ==
In May 2026, Velasquez announced that her 18th studio album, Reginified, would receive physical releases in vinyl LP, CD, and cassette formats through Backspacer Records. Originally released under Star Music in November 2024, the album contains 12 tracks previously performed by Velasquez in concerts and on the television variety show ASAP Natin 'To. The collectible editions, which became available for pre-order following the announcement, each include a unique photocard of the singer. In addition, the physical releases will feature four bonus tracks not included in the original digital edition.

== Track listing ==
Reginified track listing
No.	Title	Writer(s)	Arranger(s)	Length
1.	"'Di Sinasadya"	Ferdinand Aragon	Cezar Aguas	3:52
2.	"It Must Have Been Love"	Per Gessle	Raul Mitra	4:18
3.	"I'll Be Over You"	Steve Lukather, Randy Goodrum	Nikko Rivera	5:17
4.	"Wherever You Are"	Jay Durias, Vince Alaras	Jem Florendo	5:34
5.	"The Old Songs"	David Pomeranz, Buddy Kaye	Marc Lopez	4:48
6.	"Crazy for You"	John Bettis, Jon Lind	Raul Mitra	4:00
7.	"Ayoko Na Sana"	Odette Quesada, Bodjie Dasig	Marc Lopez	3:28
8.	"Someday"	Nyoy Volante	Bobby Velasco	3:50
9.	"The Only Exception"	Hayley Williams, Josh Farro	Nikko Rivera, Regine Velasquez	4:26
10.	"Baby One More Time"	Max Martin	Raul Mitra	4:56
11.	"Both Sides Now"	Joni Mitchell	Raul Mitra	5:12
12.	"Leaves"	Paolo Benjamin G. Guico	Homer Flores	5:16
Total length:				54:57
