= Silver (concert) =

2012 concert by Regine Velasquez

- Concert by Regine Velasquez
- Promotional poster for the show
- Location: Pasay, Metro Manila, Philippines
- Venue: Mall of Asia Arena
- Start date: November 16, 2012
- End date: January 5, 2013
- No. of shows: 2

Regine Velasquez concert chronology
- Ang Ating Musika (2007); Silver (2012); Regine at the Theater (2015)

Silver (also titled Silver Rewind) (Note: After its initial cancellation, Silver was rescheduled and promoted by some media publications as Silver Rewind.) was a two-day arena concert by Filipina entertainer Regine Velasquez. An initial concert was held on November 16, 2012, at the Mall of Asia Arena in Pasay City, with a second date taking place on January 5, 2013. Velasquez became the first local artist to play at the venue since it opened that May. The show's concept and name is a reference to the 25th anniversary of her professional debut in 1986. The setlist contained songs predominantly taken from Velasquez's discography and various covers. The show was produced by iMusic Entertainment, with GMA Network as its broadcast partner. Ryan Cayabyab and Raul Mitra served as music directors, accompanied by the Manila Philharmonic Orchestra.

Originally scheduled as a one-night show, Velasquez suffered from a viral infection and was forced to cancel her performance halfway through the concert after temporarily losing her voice. The event was rescheduled two months later, and featured Ogie Alcasid, Janno Gibbs, Gloc-9, La Diva, Rachelle Ann Go, Jaya, and Lani Misalucha as guest acts. The show was acclaimed by critics, receiving praise for Velasquez's vocal abilities and rapport with the audience, and was described as a "resounding redemption" from its initial cancellation.

== Background and development ==
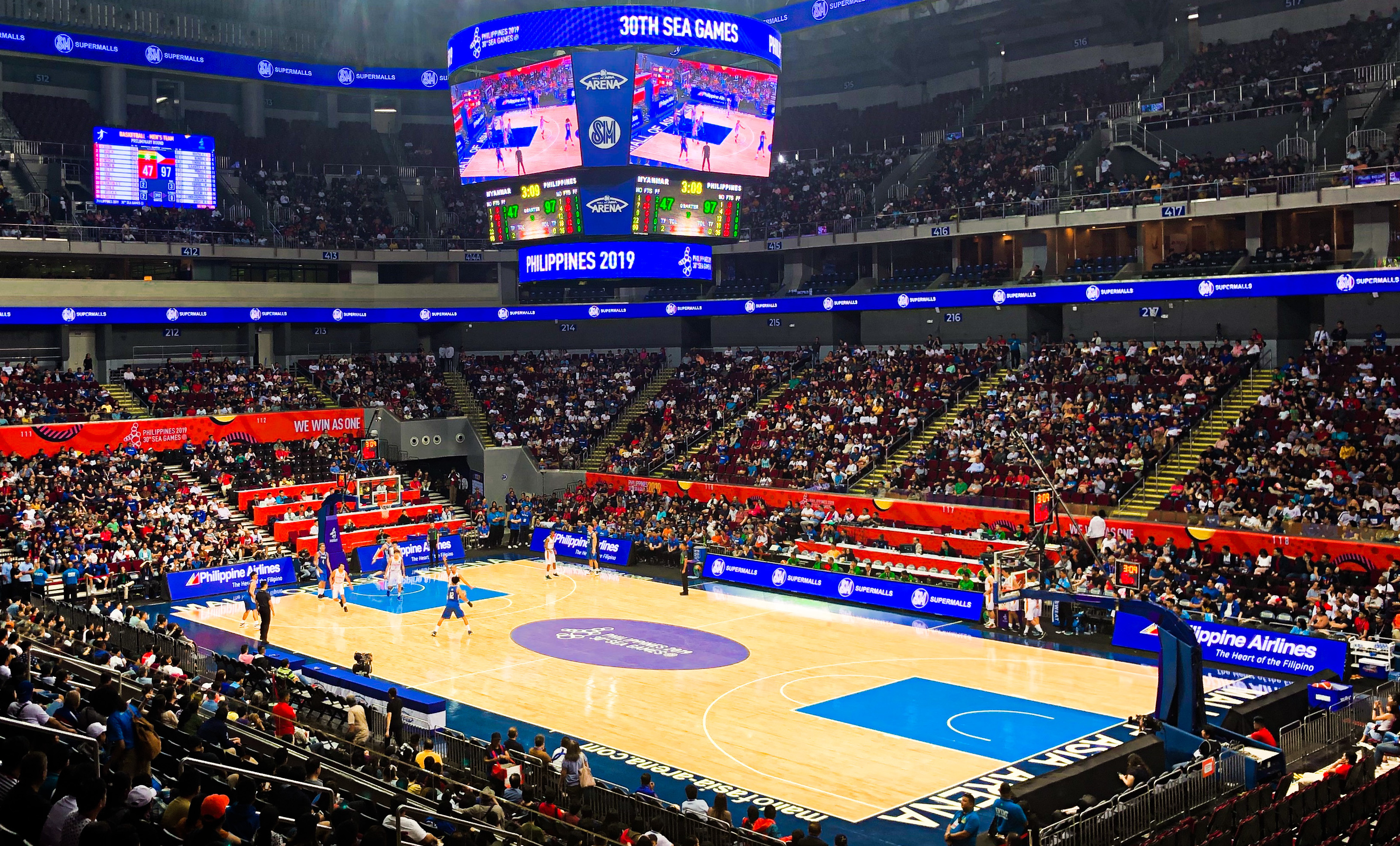
The concert took place at the Mall of Asia Arena in Pasay City, which marked Velasquez as the first Filipino solo act to perform at the venue.

Filipina singer Regine Velasquez's career began with a record deal with OctoArts International and the release of her single "Love Me Again" in 1986. After an appearance in the variety show The Penthouse Live!, she caught the attention of Ronnie Henares, a producer and talent manager who signed her to a management deal. In 1993, she signed an international record deal with PolyGram Records, and achieved commercial success in some Asian territories with her album Listen Without Prejudice (1994), which sold 700,000 copies regionally, making it the best-selling album of her career. Two more studio albums were released in the region, My Love Emotion (1995) and Retro (1997). She had previously performed anniversary shows celebrating her 10th and 20th career milestones: Isang Pasasalamat staged at the University of the Philippines's Sunken Garden in 1996, and Twenty held at the Araneta Coliseum in 2006, respectively.

On October 23, 2012, the Philippine Entertainment Portal announced that Velasquez would headline a concert on November 16 at the Mall of Asia Arena in Pasay City, which was dubbed as her "25th anniversary concert" and titled Silver. She became the first Filipino solo act to perform at the venue since it opened that May. The show was a joint production by GMA Network and iMusic Entertainment, with Smart Communications, McDonald's Philippines, and Bench as sponsors. Ryan Cayabyab and Raul Mitra were chosen as music directors, accompanied by the 60-member ensemble of the Manila Symphony Orchestra. Velasquez and her team selected Ogie Alcasid, Janno Gibbs, and Lani Misalucha as guest acts During rehearsals and preparations for the show, she revealed that the repertoire included some songs from her older albums that have been transformed into a more upbeat production, which she aimed to create an "element of surprise" for concertgoers and described it as a "new way of singing a particular song". She further said that it was vital for her to have the core of the show be a celebration and appreciation of her fans.

== Show cancellation ==
On the day of the concert, Velasquez suffered from a viral infection and temporarily lost her voice. During the show, she told to the audience: "I feel really weird standing in front of you, guys ... We thought of canceling the show because I don't have a voice." She continued to perform several numbers but was forced to cancel her performance halfway through the concert. Before leaving the stage, she announced that the show would be rescheduled at a later date: "I promise I'll do it again, and I'll do it for free, and I'll show you how it should be done ... You deserve better."

Two days later, music director Ryan Cayabyab said in a statement that he would waive his fees for the re-staging of the concert, while saying, "She came out there [after losing her voice] ... she had the courage to face ... not just courage, you really have to give her a medal." In an interview with H.O.T. TV, Velasquez described the cancellation of the concert as a humbling experience: "My health will fail me, my brain, my eyesight, my two legs will fail me, but never my voice. Never. I'll open my mouth and, always, my voice will come out. For the first time, nothing came out. So it was very difficult, but it was a journey for me and it was a lesson. There was a lesson for me to learn." On November 30, 2012, ABS-CBNnews.com reported January 5, 2013 as the rescheduled date, with the show alternatively referred to as Silver Rewind. Gloc-9, La Diva, Rachelle Ann Go, and Jaya were added as special guests.

== Synopsis and reception ==
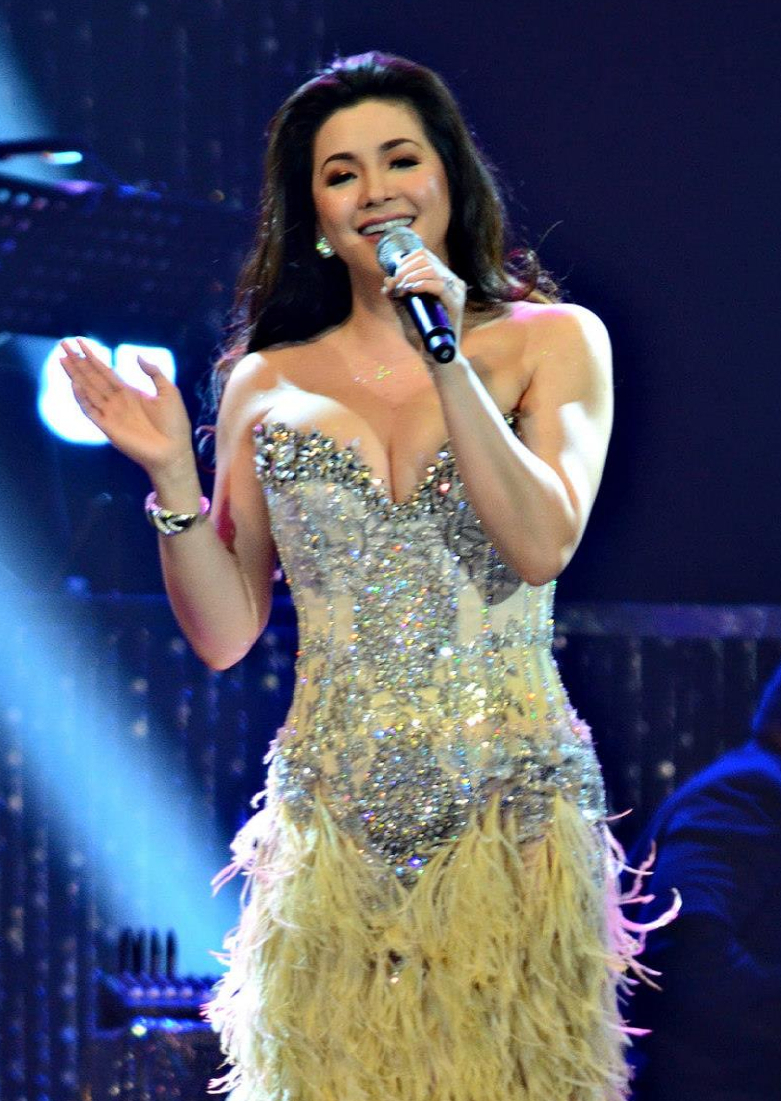
Velasquez performing during Silver Rewind

Silver Rewind started with Velasquez, dressed in a silver gown with long train, appearing from the upper stage accompanied by background dancers while singing several lines of "Shine". The song was mashed with Rihanna's "Where Have You Been" incorporating the chorus lines' trance elements. Shortly after, she began a medley of "Hot Stuff" and "Shake Your Groove Thing". After the number, she spoke briefly to the audience, saying, "I learned a lesson last year. It's not about me and it's not even about you. It's about glorifying God and this whole show we dedicate to You." Velasquez then sang a medley songs from her album Nineteen 90 (1990). She followed this with an orchestral arrangement of "Dadalhin", before being joined by Gloc-9 for a performance of "Sirena". The set list continued with an upbeat rendition of "You've Made Me Stronger". She closed the segment with a medley of her movie themes alongside Rachelle Ann Go, La Diva, and Jaya.

For "On the Wings of Love", Velasquez was lifted by fabrics for an aerial silk performance. This was followed by George Benson's "In Your Eyes" and Aerosmith's "I Don't Want to Miss a Thing". She was joined by Ogie Alcasid and Janno Gibbs for a medley of OPM songs. After a costume change, she performed Blondie's "Call Me". She followed this with a tribute number for her father and son with the songs "God Gave Me You" and "Leader of the Band". "Love Me Again" was introduced with a brief speech about her career beginnings, before closing the show with "You'll Never Walk Alone" and "You Are My Song". Velasquez returned onstage for an encore performance of "What Kind of Fool Am I?".

The concert was met with positive responses from critics. Jojo Panaligan of the Manila Bulletin praised Velasquez's wide vocal range and rapport with her audience. He emphasized how the singer managed to "regain her roar" in various musical numbers. Panaligan further remarked that the show was a "resounding redemption of reputation" after its initial cancellation. The Philippine Daily Inquirer's Dolly Anne Carvajal viewed the concert as "lovelier the second time around", and concluded that Velasquez delivered on her promise of a show the fans deserved. In a review by ABS-CBNnews.com, it noted that Velasquez showcased her powerful vocals without missing a note and a proof that "she still has what it takes". A writer for the Philippine Entertainment Portal summarized the show's concept as "a promise fulfilled" and observed that spectators were impressed of her performances.

Silver Rewind was aired as a television special on January 27, 2013, on GMA Network. For the production, Velasquez received nominations for Concert of the Year and Best Female Major Concert Act at the 5th Star Awards for Music, winning the latter.

== Set list ==
This set list is adapted from the television special Silver Rewind. (Note: Silver Rewind was aired as a television special on January 27, 2013 on GMA Network.)

1. "Shine"
2. "Hot Stuff" / "Shake Your Groove Thing"
3. "Narito Ako"
4. "Hindi Na Ayoko Na" / "Ngayong Wala Ka Na"
5. "Dadalhin"
6. "Sirena"
7. "You've Made Me Stronger"
8. "Pangarap Ko Ang Ibigin Ka" / "Pangako" / "Kailangan Ko'y Ikaw" / "Ikaw"
9. "On the Wings of Love"
10. "In Your Eyes"
11. "Kahit Ika'y Panaginip Lang" / "Araw Gabi" / "Tuwing Umuulan"
12. "I Don't Want to Miss a Thing"
13. "Hanggang Ngayon" / "Magkasuyo Buong Gabi"
14. "Call Me"
15. "God Gave Me You"
16. "Leader of the Band"
17. "Love Me Again"
18. "You'll Never Walk Alone" / "You Are My Song"

Encore

19. "What Kind of Fool Am I?"

== See also ==
- List of Regine Velasquez live performances
