= Retro (Regine Velasquez album) =

Studio album by Regine Velasquez
- Released: November 6, 1996
- Recorded: 1995–1996
- Studios: Dragon Recording Studio, Hong Kong
- Genres: Pop, dance
- Length: 1:00:49
- Language: English
- Labels: Polycosmic Records; MCA-Phil; Mercury Records; PolyGram Records
- Producers: Alex Chan (executive); Chito Ilagan; Regine Velasquez (associate)

Regine Velasquez chronology
My Love Emotion (1995)	Retro (1996)	Love Was Born On Christmas Day (1996)

Singles from Retro
- 1. "Fly"; 2. "I Just Don't Wanna Be Lonely"; 3. "Bluer Than Blue"; 4. "You Were There"; 5. "Zoom"; 6. "I Can't Help It (Duet with Remus Choy)"

Professional ratings
Review scores
Source	Rating
AllMusic	4/5 stars

Retro is the eighth studio album by Filipino singer-actress Regine Velasquez, released on November 6, 1996 through PolyGram Records. The album contains new arrangements of songs from the 1970s and 1980s such as Andy Gibb's "I Can't Help It", a duet with Remus Choy of Grasshopper, Melissa Manchester's "Through the Eyes of Love" and Foreigner's "I Want to Know What Love Is". Velasquez also did an acoustic version of Orleans's "Dance With Me" as a duet with her mother, Teresita Velasquez. Although most of the songs are remakes there are two songs ("Nothing Left for Me" and the lyrics to "Fly") with original content.

== Track listing ==
No.	Title	Writer(s)	Original artist(s)	Length
1.	"Prologue (Sound of Silence)"	Paul Simon	Simon & Garfunkel	0:37
2.	"Hot Stuff (House Mix)"	Pete Bellotte; Harold Faltermeyer; Keith Forsey	Donna Summer	4:05
3.	"I Can't Help It" (a duet with Remus Choy of Grasshopper)	Barry Gibb	Andy Gibb and Olivia Newton-John	4:35
4.	"Nothing Left For Me"	Syunichi Tokura; Trina Belamide		3:35
5.	"Shake Your Groove Thing"	Dino Fekaris; Freddie Perren	Peaches & Herb	5:25
6.	"Looking Through the Eyes of Love"	Marvin Hamlisch; Carole Bayer Sager	Melissa Manchester	4:37
7.	"Zoom"	Len Barry; Bobby Eli	Fat Larry's Band	4:50
8.	"I Want to Know What Love Is"	Mick Jones	Foreigner	4:26
9.	"Fly^{[a]}"	Jungee Marcelo (lyrics); Maurice White; Al McKay; Allee Willis		7:40
10.	"Dance With Me" (a duet with Mommy V.^{[b]})	John Hall; Johanna Hall	Orleans	3:03
11.	"You Were There"	Phil Buckle	Southern Sons	4:30
12.	"Superstar"	Bonnie Bramlett; Delaney Bramlett; Leon Russell	Delaney & Bonnie	5:50
13.	"I Just Don't Want to Be Lonely"	Bobby Eli; John Freeman; Vinnie Barrett	Ronnie Dyson	4:10
14.	"Bluer Than Blue^{[c]}"	Bernice Parks; Randy Goodrum	Michael Johnson	3:00
15.	"Epilogue (Sound Of Silence)"	Paul Simon	Simon & Garfunkel	0:35
Total length:				1:00:49

Notes

- ^{^a} contains samples from "September" by Earth, Wind & Fire.
- ^{^b} Teresita Velasquez, Regine's mother, is credited under the alias, "Mommy V.".
- ^{^c} not included on the early pressings of the album until it was released as a single.
- "Sound of Silence" (Prologue/Epilogue), "Looking Through the Eyes of Love" and "I Just Don't Want to Be Lonely" are originally titled "The Sounds of Silence", "Through the Eyes of Love" and "Just Don't Want to Be Lonely" from their original artists, respectively.

== Personnel ==
"Fly" (1996)
This clip interpolates melodies from Earth, Wind & Fire's 1978 single "September

Credits taken from Retro liner notes

Production

- Ronnie Ng – arranger (tracks 1 & 15)
- Beta Soul – arranger (track 2)
- Don Manalang – arranger (tracks 4, 5, 7, 8, 11, 13 & 14)
- Jeffrey Felix – arranger (tracks 5, 7, 8, 13 & 14)
- Jerry Joanino – arranger (tracks 6 & 10)
- Simon Chan – arranger (track 9)
- Dindo Aldecoa – arranger (tracks 10 & 12)

== See also ==
- Regine Velasquez discography
