= TicketNet =

Computerized ticketing network for concerts

- Type: Private
- Industry: Retail
- Founded: Manila, Philippine Commonwealth (1930s)
- Headquarters: Manila, Philippines
- Products: Tickets
- Website: www.ticketnet.com.ph

TicketNet is a computerized ticketing network for concerts, circus/ice show, sports events etc. exclusively for Araneta Coliseum and others. It has 31 outlets throughout the Philippines.

Araneta Coliseum is now called Smart Araneta Coliseum.
