= Sana Maulit Muli (song) =

1988 single by Gary Valenciano

Single by Gary Valenciano

from the album Moving Thoughts
- Released: 1988
- Recorded: Mid-1987
- Genre: Pop; Ballad
- Length: 4:38
- Label: WEA
- Songwriters: Gary Valenciano; Angeli Pangilinan-Valenciano
- Producer: Gary Valenciano

Gary Valenciano singles chronology
"Take Me Out of the Dark" (1988)	"Sana Maulit Muli" (1988)	"Saturday Night" (1988)

Lyric video
- "Sana Maulit Muli" on YouTube

"Sana Maulit Muli" (lit. 'Hope It Happens Again') is a song recorded by Filipino singer Gary Valenciano for his third studio album Moving Thoughts. Released in 1988 through WEA Records (present-day Universal Records), Valenciano composed and produced the song with his wife Angeli Pangilinan-Valenciano, who reworked the song from an English-language tribute for the Filipino actress Julie Vega.

"Sana Maulit MulI" would serve as the theme song of a film and TV series of the same name as well as "Ibulong mo sa Diyos".

== Background and composition ==
During a media conference of his retirement solo concert Pure Energy: One Last Time in 2024, Valenciano revealed that he initially wrote "Sana Maulit Muli" in English as a tribute for Julie Vega when she died in 1985. He further recalled that he was writing a song in English when he saw a newspaper that featured Vega dying in a hospital with Fernando Poe Jr. beside her.

Original English chorus

But why'd you close your eyes so soon?
Why'd you leave us all behind?
But why'd you close your eyes so soon?
You know me in our hearts and minds.
But why'd you close your eyes?

Given the context of the song, Valenciano promised Vega's parents that he would never release the English, expressing his wish to not profit from the song. When WEA Records asked Valenciano for a Filipino-language ballad, Valenciano's wife Angeli reworked the song in an entirely new context but retained the instrumental. Valenciano would agree to commercially release the reworked version of the song.

== Release and usage in media ==
"Sana Maulit Muli" was released a single for Valenciano's 1988 studio album Moving Thoughts.

The song became the theme song of a film of the same name starring Aga Muhlach and Lea Salonga in 1995 and won "Best Theme Song" at the 1995 FAMAS Awards. The movie was later adapted into an ABS-CBN soap opera in 2007. As the series' theme song, the song won Best Performance by a Male Recording Artist by People's Choice Award at the Awit Awards in 2008.

In 2003, Valenciano released a duet version of "Sana Maulit Muli" with Kyla under PolyEast Records, and they won "Best Performance by Duet" at the Awit Awards.

== Cover versions ==
- In 1994, Regine Velasquez released her rendition of "Sana Maulit Muli" in which she won "Best Performance by a Female Artist" at Awit Awards.
- In 1995, Lea Salonga, a lead actress in a film version, released her cover of "Sana Maulit Muli".
- In 2012, Aiza Seguerra released a cover of "Sana Maulit Muli" as a compilation album of the 2012 TV series Walang Hanggan.

== Awards and nominations ==
Year	Awards ceremony	Award	Results	Refs
1995	FAMAS Awards	Best Theme Song	Won	
2003	Awit Awards	Best Performance by Duet (with Kyla)	Won	
2008	Awit Awards	Best Performance by a Male Recording Artist (People's Choice Award)	Won	
2008	Awit Awards	Best Performance by a Male Recording Artist (Performance Award)	Nominated	
2008	Myx Music Awards	Favorite Media Soundtrack	Nominated	
