= Regine Velasquez =

Filipino singer and actress (born 1970)

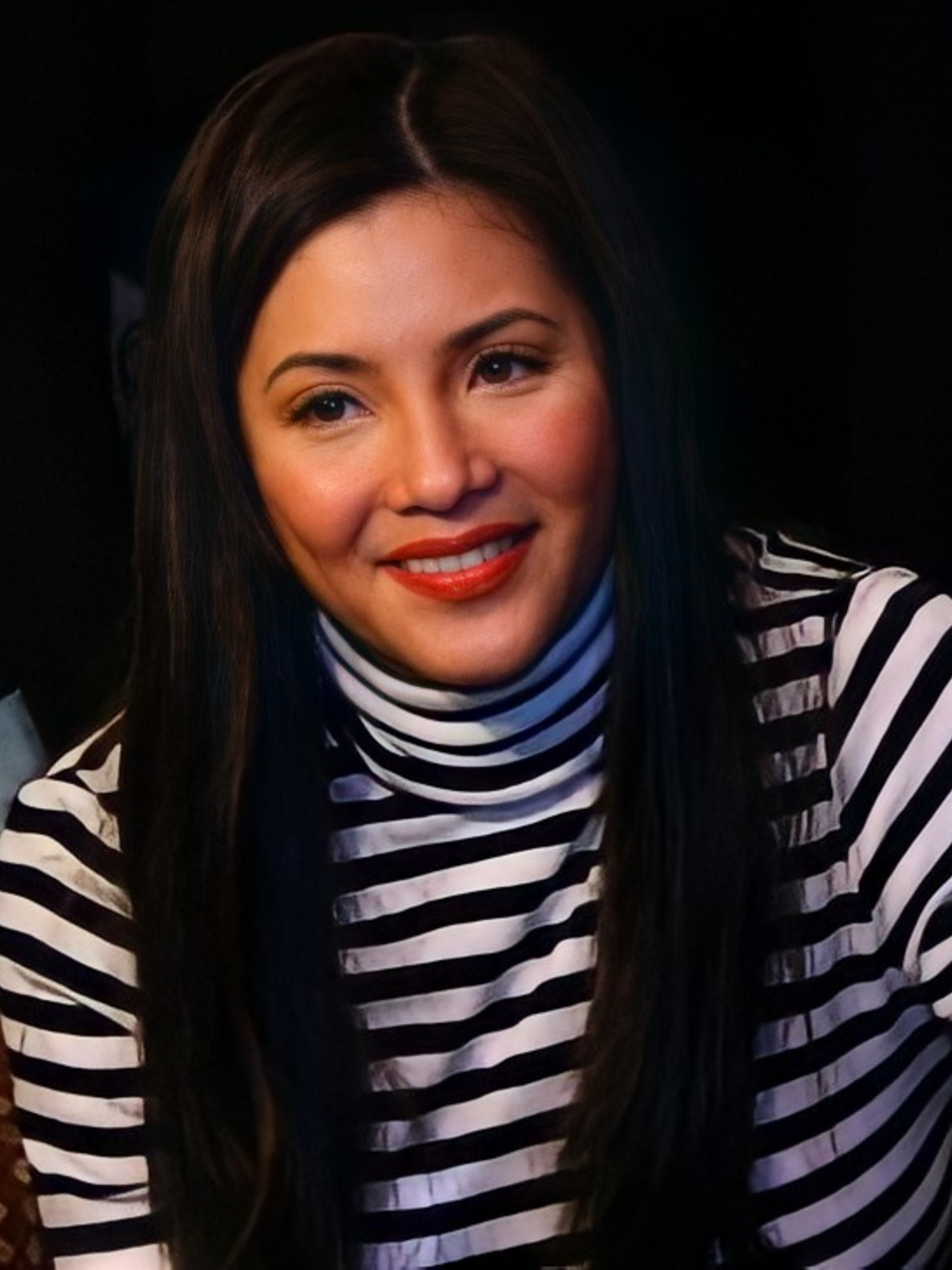
- Velasquez in 2010
- Born: Regina Encarnacion Ansong Velasquez; April 22, 1970 (age 56); Tondo, Manila, Philippines
- Occupations: Singer; actress; record producer
- Years active: 1986–present
- Works: Discography; filmography; performances; songs
- Spouse: Ogie Alcasid (m. 2010)
- Children: 1
- Awards: Full list
- Musical career
- Genres: OPM; pop
- Instrument: Vocals
- Labels: Vicor; PolyCosmic; PolyGram; Universal; Viva; Star Music

Regina Encarnacion Ansong Velasquez (/rɪˈdʒiːn vɛˈlæskɛz/ rij-EEN vel-ASK-ez; born April 22, 1970) is a Filipino singer and actress. She is considered one of the most influential figures in Philippine popular culture and is known for her vocal range and belting technique. She had unorthodox voice training during her childhood, where she was immersed neck-deep in the sea. Velasquez rose to prominence after winning the television talent show Ang Bagong Kampeon in 1984 and the Asia Pacific Singing Contest in 1989. Under the name Chona, she signed a recording contract with OctoArts International in 1986 and released the single "Love Me Again", which was commercially unsuccessful. The following year, she adopted the stage name Regine Velasquez for her debut studio album, Regine (1987), under the guidance of Viva Records executive Vic del Rosario and producer Ronnie Henares. She explored Manila sound and kundiman genres on her second and third studio albums, Nineteen 90 (1990) and Tagala Talaga (1991).

After signing an international record deal with PolyGram Records, Velasquez achieved commercial success in some Asian territories with her fifth album Listen Without Prejudice (1994), which sold more than 700,000 copies and became her highest-selling album to date, aided by its lead single "In Love with You". She experimented further with jazz and adult contemporary genres on My Love Emotion (1995), while she recorded covers on Retro (1996). After she left PolyGram to sign with Mark J. Feist's MJF Company in 1998, she released the R&B-influenced album Drawn. Velasquez's follow-up record, R2K (1999), was supported by remakes of "On the Wings of Love", "I'll Never Love This Way Again", and "I Don't Wanna Miss a Thing", and was subsequently certified twelve-times platinum by the Philippine Association of the Record Industry (PARI).

Velasquez played leading roles in the romantic comedies Kailangan Ko'y Ikaw (2000) and Pangako Ikaw Lang (2001), and received the Box Office Entertainment Award for Box Office Queen for the latter. Her performance as an intellectually disabled woman in an episode of the anthology series Maalaala Mo Kaya (2001) earned her a Star Award for Best Actress. She later starred in the prime time television series Forever in My Heart (2004), Ako si Kim Samsoon (2008), Totoy Bato (2009), Diva (2010), I Heart You, Pare! (2011), and Poor Señorita (2016). Velasquez also won the Golden Screen Award for Best Actress for playing a document forger in the comedy film Of All the Things (2012). She expanded her career into reality television talent shows as a presenter on Star for a Night (2002), Pinoy Pop Superstar (2004), and The Clash (2018), and as a judge on StarStruck (2015), Idol Philippines (2019), and Idol Kids Philippines (2025).

Having sold more than seven million records domestically and 1.5 million in Asia, Velasquez is the best-selling Filipino music artist of all time. Her accolades include two Asian Television Awards, two MTV Asia Awards, 23 Awit Awards, 18 Aliw Awards (including 3 Entertainer of the Year wins), 22 Box Office Entertainment Awards, and 18 Star Awards for Music. Referred to as "Asia's Songbird", she has consistently been credited with inspiring a generation of Filipino singers.

== Early life ==
"We were very poor but we were happy. My parents made sure that we ate on time and that was enough for me. [My father] had scoliosis and he was working at a construction site; he wasn't earning enough. My mom was good with money. She was able to stretch whatever little money we had."

— Velasquez on her childhood

Regina Encarnacion Ansong Velasquez was born on April 22, 1970, in Tondo, Manila, to Teresita (née Ansong) and Gerardo Velasquez. She has three sisters—Cacai, Diane, and Deca—and a brother, Jojo. Her family moved to Hinundayan, Southern Leyte, where Velasquez spent the early years of her life. At age three, Velasquez became interested in music after listening to her father's lullabies. She would listen to her mother play guitar and piano while her father sang, and cited Sharon Cuneta's "Mr. DJ" as one of the first songs she learned.

Velasquez started singing at age six; she underwent intensive vocal training with her father, who immersed her neck-deep in the sea and had her go through vocal runs. She credits this unorthodox method for strengthening her core and stomach muscles, and developing her lung capacity. Velasquez placed third in her first singing competition on Betty Mendez Livioco's The Tita Betty's Children Show.

When Velasquez was nine, her family moved to Balagtas, Bulacan, where she attended St. Lawrence Academy and competed for her school at the annual Bulacan Private Schools Association singing competition. In 1984, at fourteen, Velasquez auditioned for the RPN's reality television series Ang Bagong Kampeon. She qualified and became the show's senior division winner, defending her spot for eight consecutive weeks. Velasquez won the competition and was signed to a record deal with OctoArts International.

== Music career ==
=== 1986–1989: Career beginnings and Regine ===
In 1986, Velasquez initially used the stage name Chona and released the single "Love Me Again", which failed commercially. At the recommendation of another OctoArts recording artist, Pops Fernandez, she appeared on The Penthouse Live! While rehearsing for the show, Velasquez caught the attention of Ronnie Henares, a producer and talent manager who signed her to a management deal. Velasquez adopted the stage name Regine at the suggestion of Martin Nievera, Fernandez's husband and The Penthouse Live! co-host.

Velasquez signed with Viva Records and released her debut album Regine in 1987. Henares served as an executive producer and worked with songwriters Joaquin Francisco Sanchez and Vehnee Saturno. Three singles were released in 1987: "Kung Maibabalik Ko Lang", " Urong Sulong", and "Isang Lahi". During this period, Velasquez appeared on the ABS-CBN television shows Triple Treat and Teen Pan Alley. Two years after Regine's release, Velasquez represented the Philippines in the 1989 Asia Pacific Singing Contest in Hong Kong and won, performing the songs "You'll Never Walk Alone" from the musical Carousel and "And I Am Telling You I'm Not Going" from the musical Dreamgirls.

=== 1990–1993: Nineteen 90 and Reason Enough ===
Velasquez released her second studio album, Nineteen 90, in 1990. She worked with Louie Ocampo on the album's lead single "Narito Ako", which was originally recorded and performed by Maricris Bermont and written by Nonong Pedero for the 1978 Metro Manila Popular Music Festival. Later that year, she headlined her first major concert at the Folk Arts Theater. She recorded "Please Be Careful with My Heart" with Jose Mari Chan, who released the track on his album Constant Change; she also sang backing vocals on Gary Valenciano's "Each Passing Night", which appears on his album Faces of Love.

In 1991, Velasquez made her North American concert debut at Carnegie Hall in New York City, a first for an Asian solo artist. British theatrical producer Cameron Mackintosh later invited Velasquez to audition for the West End production of the musical Miss Saigon. She received a letter from the production offering to train her in London, which she declined: partly due to her lack of experience in musical theater, and also because she wished to remain with her family.

Velasquez's third studio album Tagala Talaga was released in October 1991. It includes cover versions of recordings by National Artist for Music recipients Ryan Cayabyab, Lucio San Pedro, and Levi Celerio. The album's lead single, titled "Buhay ng Buhay Ko", was originally recorded by Leah Navarro and was written by Pedero, with whom Velasquez had worked on Nineteen 90. Other notable singles from the album include "Anak" and "Sa Ugoy ng Duyan".

PolyGram Far East announced a joint-venture licensing deal in the Philippines in July 1993 with the formation of its subsidiary PolyCosmic Records. Velasquez recorded a duet titled "It's Hard to Say Goodbye" with Canadian singer Paul Anka, which became the new label's first release. The single was later included on her fourth studio album Reason Enough. David Gonzales of AllMusic described the album as "more attuned to international ears" and said Velasquez's vocals are "thin and unimpressive". One of its singles, "Sana Maulit Muli", won the Awit Award for Best Performance by a Female Recording Artist in 1994.

=== 1994–1998: Listen Without Prejudice and My Love Emotion ===
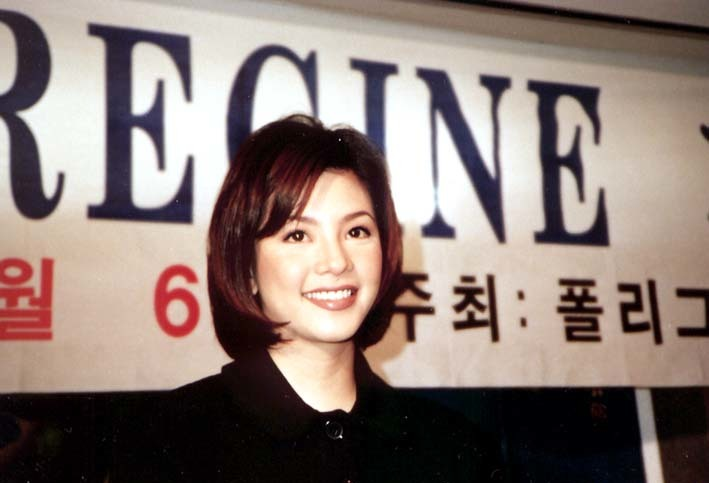
Velasquez at a press launch in 1996

Velasquez released her fifth studio album Listen Without Prejudice in 1994. She worked with songwriters, including Glenn Medeiros, Trina Belamide, and John Laudon. The album was released in several countries in Southeast and East Asia, including China, Hong Kong, Indonesia, Malaysia, Singapore, Taiwan, and Thailand. The album's lead single "In Love with You" features Cantonese singer Jacky Cheung. Gonzales commended the record's themes and said, "Cheung's presence on the duet had much to do with the overseas success". The album had sold more than 700,000 copies worldwide, including 100,000 in the Philippines, making it Velasquez's best-selling album to date.

Velasquez's sixth studio album My Love Emotion was released in 1995. The title track, which was written by Southern Sons vocalist Phil Buckle, was described by Gonzales as a "triumph [and] an outstanding vehicle, containing a strong melody and hook in the chorus". The album made a combined regional and domestic sales of 250,000 copies.

For her seventh studio album Retro (1996), Velasquez recorded cover versions of popular music of the 1970s and 1980s from artists including Donna Summer, Foreigner, and the Carpenters. The album's only original track, "Fly", is credited to Earth, Wind & Fire members Maurice White, Al McKay, and Allee Willis, because the song interpolates the melody of their single "September". Velasquez left PolyCosmic in 1998, and signed a six-album contract with the MJF Company. That year, her ninth studio album Drawn was released. MJF head Mark J. Feist wrote and produced most of the tracks, including the lead single "How Could You Leave". Drawn sold more than 40,000 copies and was awarded a platinum certification within two weeks of its release. (Note: Claimed sales figures are supported by the following specified certified units: For music certifications prior to 1990s up to 2006, PARI's threshold for an album to receive Platinum certification was 40,000 units shipped: Williamson, Nigel (January 22, 2000). "Global Music Impulse". Billboard. Vol. 112, no. 4. p. 69. ISSN 0006-2510. Archived from the original on July 24, 2013.; For music certifications beginning 2007, PARI's threshold for an album to receive Platinum certification was 30,000 units shipped: "International Certification Award Levels 2007" (PDF). International Federation of the Phonographic Industry. Archived from the original (PDF) on January 9, 2007.; For music certifications beginning 2008, PARI's threshold for an album to receive Platinum certification was 25,000 units shipped: "International Certification Award Levels 2008" (PDF). International Federation of the Phonographic Industry. Archived from the original (PDF) on June 25, 2008.; For music certifications beginning 2009, PARI's threshold for an album to receive Platinum certification was 20,000 units shipped: "International Certification Award Levels 2009" (PDF). International Federation of the Phonographic Industry. Archived from the original (PDF) on February 15, 2010.; For music certifications since 2013 to present, PARI's threshold for an album to receive Platinum certification was 15,000 units shipped: "International Certification Award Levels 2013" (PDF). International Federation of the Phonographic Industry. Archived from the original (PDF) on March 28, 2014.)

=== 1999–2003: R2K and Reigne ===
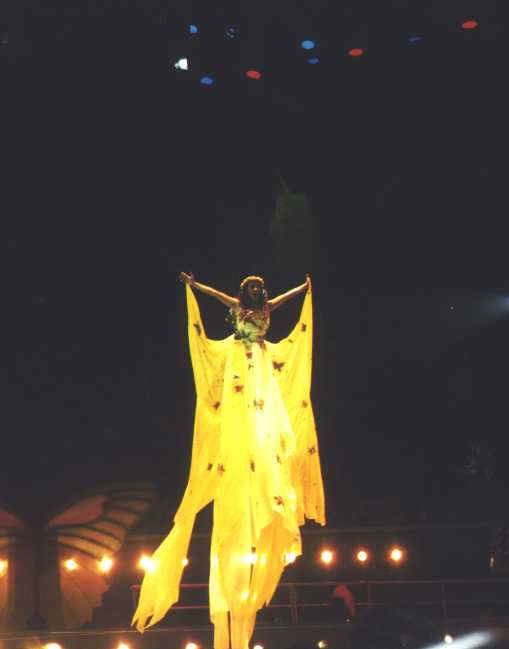
Velasquez performing "Butterfly" during her R2K Concert in April 2000

Velasquez produced most of her next album R2K, which was released on November 27, 1999. She recorded remakes of Jeffrey Osborne's "On the Wings of Love", Dionne Warwick's "I'll Never Love This Way Again", Aerosmith's "I Don't Wanna Miss a Thing", and ABBA's "Dancing Queen", among others. Gonzales criticized the record's "infatuation with Western popular music" and called Velasquez's singing "self-assured [but] also unimpressive". Commercially, R2K sold more than 40,000 copies in its second week of release, earning a platinum certification, and was certified four times platinum a year later. R2K has since been certified twelve times platinum, becoming the highest-selling album by a female artist in the Philippines. On December 31, 1999, Velasquez was a featured musical act in 2000 Today, a BBC millennium television special that attracted a worldwide audience of more than 800 million viewers with its core program broadcast across the world's time zones, which began with Kiribati Line Islands and ended in American Samoa.

Velasquez headlined and directed the R2K Concert at the Araneta Coliseum in April 2000, which won her Best Female Major Concert Act at the 13th Aliw Awards. Ricky Lo from The Philippine Star was generally impressed with the production and complimented Velasquez's "boundless energy and creativity". She also performed a concert at the Westin Philippine Plaza that year, which spawned the release of her first live album Regine Live: Songbird Sings the Classics in December 2000. Although it was criticized for its audio mixing, the album was certified six times platinum. Velasquez worked with Filipino songwriters for material on her eleventh studio album Reigne. The album and its lead single "To Reach You" were released in December 2001. Other singles were Tats Faustino's "Dadalhin" and Janno Gibbs' "Sa Aking Pag-iisa". Gonzales called the album "an adventurous set" and praised the quality of the songwriting.

Velasquez won the inaugural 2002 MTV Asia Award for Favorite Artist Philippines in February 2002. She performed "Cry" with Mandy Moore to promote the theatrical release of Moore's film A Walk to Remember. In March, Velasquez hosted the first season of Star for a Night, which is based on the British talent show of the same name. In April, she headlined a benefit concert called One Night with Regine at the National Museum of the Philippines, which was a collaboration with ABS-CBN Foundation to benefit Bantay Bata Foundation's child abuse response fund. The show won Best Musical Program at the 7th Asian Television Awards.

At the 2003 MTV Asia Awards, Velasquez won her second consecutive award for Favorite Artist Philippines. In May 2003, she embarked on Martin & Regine: The World Concert Tour with Nievera. The following month, Velasquez returned to host the second season of Search for a Star. That November, she had a concert residency named Songbird Sings Streisand, a tribute to American singer and actress Barbra Streisand, at Makati's Onstage Theatre.

=== 2004–2007: Covers Volume 1 and Volume 2 ===
In February 2004, Velasquez and Ogie Alcasid co-headlined a concert, The Songbird & The Songwriter, at the Araneta Coliseum, and they embarked on a North American tour that April. At the 17th Aliw Awards, she won Best Female Performance in a Concert and was nominated for Entertainer of the Year for the collaboration. Velasquez hosted the reality talent show Pinoy Pop Superstar, which began airing on GMA Network that July. In October 2004, she released "Forevermore", the lead single from her twelfth studio album Covers Volume 1. Its songs were originally recorded by Filipino male artists, and it was her most expensive cover album to produce due in part to the cost of securing licensing rights for songs by local songwriters, including Ariel Rivera's "Minsan Lang Kita Iibigan", Basil Valdez's "Say That You Love Me", and Nonoy Zuñiga's "Araw-Gabi". The album has since been certified six times Platinum.

Later in November and December 2005, Velasquez had an eight-day concert residency named Reflections at the Aliw Theater. The sequel album Covers Volume 2 was released in February 2006. Unlike its predecessor, it contains songs by foreign artists, including Alanis Morissette's "Head Over Feet", Blondie's "Call Me", and Elvis Presley's "Blue Suede Shoes". Manila Bulletin's Jojo Panaligan was generally impressed with Velasquez's "versatility" and the album tracks' "jazzy and blues-y interpretation". In October 2006, she performed a concert titled Twenty at the Araneta Coliseum, which won her Best Female Major Concert Act and Entertainer of the Year award at the 20th Aliw Awards. In 2007, she became co-host of the reality television show Celebrity Duets, an interactive music competition based on the eponymous original US show.

=== 2008–2012: Low Key and professional hiatus ===
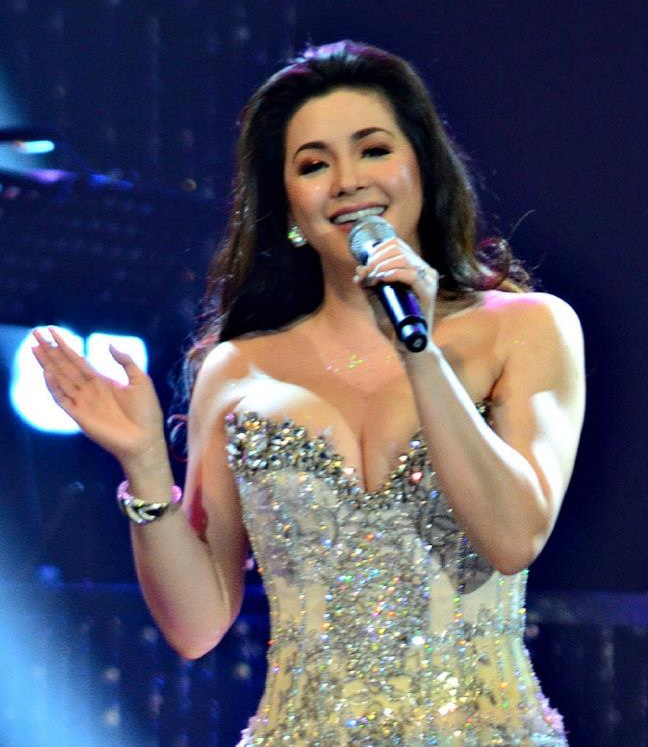
Velasquez on her Silver concert at the Mall of Asia Arena in 2013

Velasquez developed other television projects in 2008. She appeared in Songbird, a weekly late-night musical television show that featured performances by musical guests. She also featured in the musical television special The Best of Me, which was filmed at her residence in Quezon City. Velasquez signed a deal with Universal Records and released an album titled Low Key in December 2008. The album consists of cover versions of international songs that she described as "more relaxed, laid-back and restrained". It includes tracks such as Billy Joel's "She's Always a Woman", Dan Fogelberg's "Leader of the Band", and Janis Ian's "At Seventeen". The Philippine Daily Inquirer praised the album's maturity and wrote, "[Velasquez] no longer shrieks and shouts as much as she used to". The album sold more than 25,000 copies within two months of its release and was certified platinum. In May 2009, she appeared on the television documentary Roots to Riches, which chronicles her personal and professional struggles, and includes musical performances filmed in her hometown of Malolos, Bulacan. Later that month, she hosted the television talent show Are You the Next Big Star?.

Velasquez's next album, a double CD set called Fantasy, was released in December 2010. The first disc is composed of Original Pilipino Music (OPM) recordings and the second includes covers of international singles such as Madonna's "Papa Don't Preach", Toronto's "What About Love", and the Eagles' "Love Will Keep Us Alive". The Philippine Daily Inquirer called the album "vocally sumptuous" and was generally impressed with Velasquez's vocals and range. Fantasy received a platinum certification and earned three nominations at the 3rd Star Awards for Music. After receiving the Magna Award at the Myx Music Awards 2011, and the confirmation of her pregnancy, Velasquez took a hiatus from public engagements. She returned to television on October 6, 2012, with Sarap Diva, a weekly lifestyle talk show. On November 16, Velasquez performed a concert titled Silver at the Mall of Asia Arena, which was cut short after she lost her voice due to a viral infection.

=== 2013–2016: Silver Rewind and Hulog Ka ng Langit ===
After Silver's cancellation, Velasquez restaged the concert on January 5, 2013. The concert received generally favorable reviews; Manila Bulletin's Jojo Panaligan called it a "redemption of reputation", while Dolly Anne Carvajal of the Philippine Daily Inquirer said Velasquez did not fail to make up for the initial cancellation of the show. The following month, she co-headlined in Foursome alongside Alcasid, Fernandez, and Nievera. For both shows, Velasquez received four nominations at the 5th Star Awards for Music, winning Best Female Major Concert Act for Silver and Concert of the Year for Foursome.

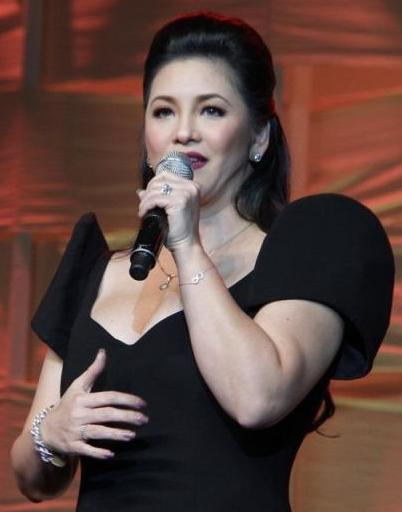
Velasquez at an event for Jollibee in 2015

In November 2013, Velasquez's album Hulog Ka ng Langit was released; it received a platinum certification for two-week sales of 15,000 copies. She won Best Inspirational Record for "Nathaniel (Gift of God)" and Best Christmas Recording for "Hele ni Inay" at the 27th Awit Awards, while Hulog Ka Ng Langit won Album Cover of the Year at the 6th Star Awards for Music. In 2014, she worked with Nievera in a one-night show titled Voices of Love, with Gloc-9 on "Takipsilim", and with Vice Ganda on "Push Mo Yan Teh!".

In February 2015, Velasquez appeared alongside Nievera, Valenciano, and Lani Misalucha in a concert titled Ultimate at the Mall of Asia Arena. She received accolades at the 47th Box Office Entertainment Awards, 7th Star Awards for Music, and 5th Edukcircle Awards for the production. In the same year, Velasquez served as a judge on the sixth season of the reality talent television show StarStruck. In November 2015, Velasquez headlined a four-date concert residency called Regine at the Theater, which featured songs from musicals.

For the third consecutive year, Velasquez appeared in a co-headlining concert at the Mall of Asia Arena in February 2016. The two-night show, Royals, reunited her with Nievera and also features Angeline Quinto and Erik Santos. Due to the concert's positive critical reception, Velasquez won Best Female Concert Performer at the 48th Box Office Entertainment Awards and Most Influential Concert Performer of the Year at the 6th Edukcircle Awards. In December 2016, People Asia magazine included Velasquez on its annual People of the Year list.

=== 2017–2020: R3.0 and television projects ===
Velasquez hosted Full House Tonight, which ran from February to May 2017. The following month, she announced that she had returned to Viva Records and that she had begun production of a new studio album called R3.0. In August 2017, a cover of Up Dharma Down's 2010 song "Tadhana" was released as a promotional single. An original track called "Hugot" was released as the album's lead single the following month. In November she headlined the R3.0 Concert at the Mall of Asia Arena, and two months later, with Alcasid, she played a four-date U.S. concert tour titled Mr. and Mrs. A.

Velasquez hosted the first season of the television talent show The Clash, which premiered on July 7, 2018. In October, she signed a network deal with ABS-CBN; her subsequent projects included serving as a judge on the Idol franchise series Idol Philippines, and hosting the musical variety show ASAP Natin 'To. In partnership with the network, Velasquez staged a three-date concert series, titled Regine at the Movies, at the New Frontier Theater, which opened on November 17, 2018, to critical appraisal centering on Velasquez's vocals.

Sharon Cuneta and Velasquez co-headlined a concert, Iconic, at the Araneta Coliseum in October 2019. For the show, she received the awards for Best Collaboration in a Concert and Entertainer of the Year at the 32nd Aliw Awards, becoming one of the few performers to win the latter honor thrice. Velasquez and Moira Dela Torre released a single together, "Unbreakable", for the soundtrack of the film of the same name. She also contributed to the soundtracks of the spy-action thriller series The General's Daughter (2019) and the drama series Love Thy Woman (2020). Having signed with BYS Cosmetics, Velasquez became the Australian beauty brand's ambassador. She released the promotional single, "I Am Beautiful", for their print media advertising campaign. In February 2020, Velasquez worked with Sarah Geronimo on a joint concert titled Unified.

Amidst the COVID-19 pandemic, Velasquez organized virtual benefit concerts in support of relief efforts. She curated One Night with Regine on April 25, 2020, to benefit the Bantay Bata Foundation's COVID-19 response fund; the special raised ₱4.2 million (US$77,000). That June, she worked with Jollibee Foods Corporation and appeared in Joy From Home, which raised money in support of the brand's food aid program. In collaboration with Alcasid, Velasquez joined forces with PLDT, Inc. for its No Learner Left Behind fundraiser. The initiative raised more than ₱1 million (US$20,000) to help provide reliable internet access and distance learning tools to students in rural areas and from disadvantaged families.

=== 2021–present: Freedom, Solo, and Reginified ===
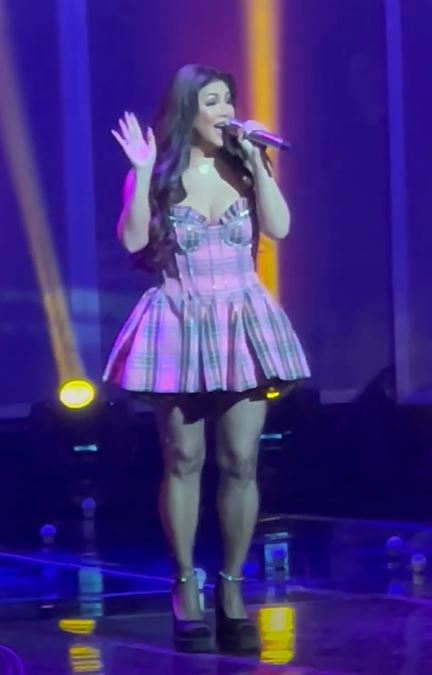
Velasquez on her Solo concert residency in 2023

Freedom was Velasquez's first livestream concert outside her benefit show ventures. Performed on February 28, 2021, at the ABS-CBN Studios, it was broadcast via four live streaming platforms. Velasquez said she crafted the virtual show because of her desire to perform material from a variety of music genres and step out of her comfort zone. Ticket sales grossed more than ₱1 million (US$20,000) within twelve hours after they were made available for purchase. Additional VIP tickets were sold because of high demand. Critics commended Freedom's intimate production and Velasquez's vocal performances. She featured on Davey Langit's single "Ipinagpanata Kita", released in August 2021. That year, she recorded the soundtrack themes for the drama series La Vida Lena and the action series Ang Probinsyano. At the 35th Awit Awards, Velasquez won Best Song Written for Movie/TV/Stage Play for her work on the latter.

Velasquez spent much of 2022 working on television projects. She returned as a judge for the second season of Idol Philippines, which premiered on June 25, 2022. In August, she joined the morning talk show Magandang Buhay as its host, replacing Karla Estrada. She then appeared as a guest judge on the first season of Drag Race Philippines, a spin-off of RuPaul's Drag Race. At the 13th Star Awards for Music, Velasquez won Concert of the Year and was named Female Concert Performer of the Year for her work on Unified. Following its initial cancellation, Velasquez and Cuneta embarked on a U.S. concert series for Iconic, which commenced on July 9, 2022.

After a two-year hiatus from headlining a live event, Velasquez staged a four-date concert residency, entitled Solo, at the Samsung Performing Arts Theater from February 17–25, 2023. Featuring songs she has never performed before, Velasquez experimented with disco, funk, and chill-out music styles on it. Reviewers praised Velasquez's mature artistry and vocals. Two extra dates in April were added to the itinerary after the show concluded its initial run. She then reunited with Cuneta on a second U.S. leg of the Iconic tour in March. On October 13, 2023, Velasquez released a cover of Roxette's "It Must Have Been Love", the lead single from her upcoming studio album, Reginified, which would feature remakes of songs she performed in previous concerts and televised appearances. At the Mall of Asia Arena in November 2023, she headlined Regine Rocks, a themed concert exploring rock music and its subgenres. It was followed by a three-date U.S. leg in February, and a re-staging in April.

== Acting career ==
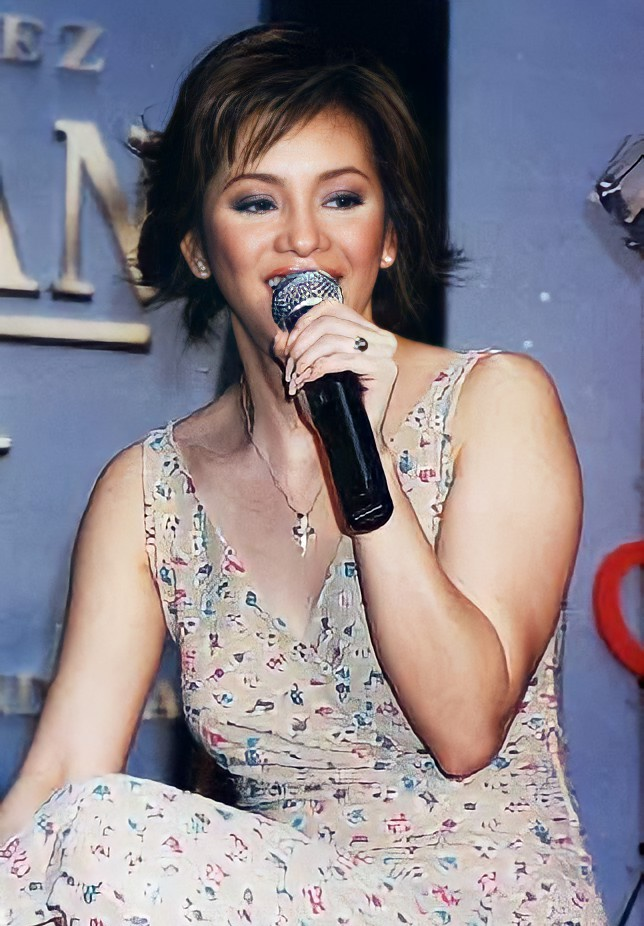
Velasquez promoting Kailangan Ko'y Ikaw in 2000

Velasquez made her film debut with a minor role in the 1988 comedy film The Untouchable Family. Its soundtrack includes her single "Urong Sulong". She continued to appear in a series of supporting roles in comedies, including Pik Pak Boom (1988) and Elvis and James 2 (1990). In 1995, she worked with composer Ryan Cayabyab on the musical theater version of José Rizal's Noli Me Tángere, where she played the female lead, María Clara. Vic del Rosario, head of Viva Entertainment's film production arm, saw Velasquez in one of her performances and offered her a starring role in a film, playing a music teacher in the romantic comedy Wanted: Perfect Mother (1996) opposite Christopher de Leon. Martin Nievera and Louie Ocampo wrote "You Are My Song" for the film's soundtrack, for which she won Best Movie Theme Song and Best Ballad Recording at the Awit Awards. Later in 1996, she starred alongside Donna Cruz and Mikee Cojuangco in the musical comedy Do Re Mi. Velasquez continued to play leading roles in romantic comedies, appearing in Honey Nasa Langit Na Ba Ako? (1998) with Janno Gibbs and Dahil May Isang Ikaw (1999) with Aga Muhlach. In 2000, she was a guest performer in an episode of the anthology drama series Habang May Buhay, playing Piolo Pascual's cancer-stricken love interest.

A key point in Velasquez's film career came when she was cast in Joyce Bernal's Kailangan Ko'y Ikaw (2000) opposite Robin Padilla. The film critic Noel Vera dismissed its plot as the "nth variation of Roman Holiday", but credited Velasquez for showcasing "her own public persona and charisma and sense of humor" to her character. Her next film release was the romantic comedy Pangako Ikaw Lang (2001), which reunited her with Bernal and Muhlach. She portrayed a florist who meets a patient (played by Muhlach) at the hospital where her father was admitted. A writer for The Philippine Star considered the pair's "unmistakable chemistry" to be the film's prime asset, while Vera was impressed with its direction and writing, and described Velasquez's performance as "sunny good nature [with a] light comic touch". Pangako Ikaw Lang was a commercial success, becoming the highest-grossing Filipino film of 2001. Velasquez was subsequently named Box Office Queen at the Box Office Entertainment Awards.

Also in 2001, Velasquez appeared in an episode of the anthology series Maalaala Mo Kaya, playing an intellectually disabled woman. It was the most-watched and highest-rated of the program, with a reported 47.9 percent viewership. For her portrayal, she won the Star Award for Best Single Performance by an Actress. The Yam Laranas-directed romantic drama Ikaw Lamang Hanggang Ngayon (2002), opposite Richard Gomez, saw her play a mundane and undesirable mail sorter. Writing for The Philippine Star, Butch Francisco deemed the film to be vacuous and awkward overall, but thought it had "moments of fun, entertainment and romance". She next took on the role of a woman who falls in love with a widowed man (played by De Leon) in the drama Pangarap Ko ang Ibigin Ka. The film premiered at the 2003 Manila Film Festival to polarized reception from critics; Isah Red of the Manila Standard criticized the film's visuals and lack of narrative coherence. Terming the film formulaic, Francisco believed that Velasquez was brilliant in "dramatic moments", in a performance he described as a "crowd pleaser", though he found her comedic delivery superfluous. That year, Velasquez starred alongside Bong Revilla in the superhero film Captain Barbell.

Although Velasquez did not make any film appearances in 2004, she made her prime time television debut in the drama series Forever in My Heart, in which she played a wedding planner caught in a love triangle with Gomez's and Ariel Rivera's characters. She next starred in romantic dramas, reuniting with Padilla in Till I Met You (2006) and with Pascual in Paano Kita Iibigin (2007); the latter earned her FAMAS and Luna Award nominations for Best Actress. In 2008, she played the titular character in the comedy series remake Ako si Kim Samsoon, based on the original South Korean television show. The show featured her as a chef hired by a restaurant owner (played by Mark Anthony Fernandez) to pretend to be his lover as a ruse for his overbearing mother. The Philippine Star's Arnel Ramos praised her pairing with Fernandez, commending their "crackling rapport that will no doubt send viewers in a romantic frenzy". In the same year, she provided her voice to the eponymous heroine in the animated film Urduja.

Velasquez made cameo appearances in three comedies of 2009—Kimmy Dora, OMG (Oh, My Girl!), and Yaya and Angelina: The Spoiled Brat Movie. She initially turned down an offer to star in the drama series Totoy Bato (2009) in favor of a musical-themed television project, but agreed after the latter production faced significant delays. Directed by Mac Alejandre and based on Carlo J. Caparas' comic book of the same name, it is about the fictional titular boxer (played by Padilla). She portrayed the part of the love interest to Padilla's character. The role required her to perform action scenes, and in preparation, undertook boxing training. After the project was greenlit, Velasquez was cast as Sampaguita, the lead in Dominic Zapata's 2010 musical comedy series Diva, a loosely adapted version of the 2006 film 200 Pounds Beauty. It follows a facially disfigured singer who undergoes a transformation. To look the part, she wore prosthetic makeup which took three hours to apply. The series featured numerous song covers sung onscreen by the characters. According to Velasquez, the song choices were integral to script development, and featured one to two production numbers per week. A journalist for The Philippine Star favored the show's tone and quality, highlighting Velasquez's musical numbers.

"They affect me so much physically and emotionally ... I'm the type of actress who can't let go of my character so easily. When I'm already able to get the right emotion, I just can't shake it off when I leave the set. I unconsciously bring home the character with me."

— Velasquez explaining why she is selective of dramatic roles

Andoy Ranay's I Heart You, Pare! was Velasquez's television project of 2011, which she described as a "flashy and colorful world" of the LGBT community. The series follows a woman who is on the run and disguises as a gay man after being wrongly accused of a crime. To play the dual roles of Tonya and Tonette, she created a backstory for her female character; and to get into the drag alter ego's physical and mental space during filming, modelled nuances and mannerisms on Ranay, who is openly gay. Later in 2011, Velasquez left the show for health reasons and was replaced by Iza Calzado. The romantic comedy Of All the Things (2012), in which she played a document forger, was Velasquez's third collaboration with Bernal and Muhlach. Philbert Dy of ClickTheCity termed the film a "tedious, unfocused mess that forces chemistry where none really exists". Despite this, she earned a Golden Screen Award for Best Actress for her performance. She next starred in the independent film Mrs. Recto, a comedy-drama set principally on Recto Avenue. The director Dante Nico Garcia wanted Velasquez to play the part of a single mother by deglamorizing—aspects that he felt were missing from performances she had done in the past—and thus asked her to dissociate from her "well-coifed" persona. The film only received a limited digital release on December 25, 2015.

In the series Poor Señorita (2016), Velasquez starred as a powerful and demanding business magnate, a character inspired by Meryl Streep's Miranda Priestly. In preparation, she kept her distance from the cast to maintain an uneasy chemistry in their scenes. In his review for the Philippine Daily Inquirer, Nestor Torre Jr. found her to be "perfectly cast" as the anti-hero, praising Velasquez for "opting to set her own pace, vocal placement, and tempo" in her portrayal. In 2017, she played the supporting part of an earth goddess in Mulawin vs. Ravena, a sequel to the 2004 fantasy series Mulawin, featuring Dennis Trillo and Miguel Tanfelix. She then portrayed the titular character in Yours Truly, Shirley (2019), an independent drama directed by Nigel Santos. It tells the story of a woman who believes her late husband is reincarnated in a pop star. Velasquez was reluctant to take the role, worried of being unprepared after a seven-year break from acting in a film. She ultimately agreed to the project after Santos convinced her to take the part. Oggs Cruz of Rappler was critical of Velasquez's "middling" delivery, writing that she lacked "the extent of absurdism" required of the role. Jocelyn Valle of the Philippine Entertainment Portal, however, took note of her earnest and mature characterization. She received a nomination for Best Actress at the Cinema One Originals Film Festival. In January 2020, Velasquez briefly appeared in the iWant comedy series My Single Lady.

== Artistry ==
=== Influences ===
As a child, Velasquez enjoyed listening to her father singing classic songs to lull her to sleep; she was drawn to traditional songs rather than nursery rhymes because of this routine. Since her childhood, Velasquez has considered Sharon Cuneta a role model and credits Cuneta as a key inspiration who led her to pursue a musical career.

Velasquez's music is influenced by artists such as Sheena Easton, Angela Bofill, Whitney Houston, and Mariah Carey in her early years. She admires Houston for her "style and R&B influence" and Carey's songwriting. On several occasions, Velasquez has cited Barbra Streisand as her main influence and musical inspiration, saying, "I look up to [Streisand] not just because of her enormous talent, but because of her fearlessness and dedication to excellence, her willingness to take risks and to be different." Streisand's music has frequently featured in Velasquez's repertoire throughout her career, including a series of concerts paying homage to Streisand, which Velasquez described as "a pleasure" to perform. Velasquez has also been influenced by many Filipino artists; early in her career, she cited Kuh Ledesma, Joey Albert, Gary Valenciano, Martin Nievera, and Pops Fernandez as her role models. She has also paid tribute to Filipino songwriters, including George Canseco, Rey Valera, Basil Valdez, Ryan Cayabyab, and Willy Cruz.

=== Musical style and themes ===
Velasquez's early-career music includes elements of traditional OPM love songs. She described how she developed her musical style, saying, "I was only 16 and people didn't know what to do with me. When they want me to sing love songs, they had to explain to me what it meant because I didn't know the feeling yet." Her debut album Regine includes ballads and bubblegum pop love songs; its themes revolve around feelings of "excitement and uncertainty", as well as "missed chances and regrets". Elvin Luciano from CNN Philippines wrote: "During her [initial] phase, she proved that Filipino love songs don't have to come pre-packaged in the kundiman-rooted love ballad." Her later releases, including Nineteen 90 and Tagala Talaga, capitalized on her popularity; they are dominated by Filipino love songs. Velasquez began working with foreign songwriters while planning her first regional album Listen Without Prejudice, which according to AllMusic is "oriented towards easy-listening love songs with adventurous, contemporary touches". The album features tracks with syncopated backbeats and hip-hop influences.

During the mid-1990s and the early 2000s, Velasquez's albums consisted primarily of cover versions of international material because of its commercial viability, and Filipinos' preference for American music. According to CNN Philippines, "Regine has a knack for choosing songs which at first, may not fit her, but eventually become her own." Many of her songs, particularly in Retro, Drawn, and R2K, contained R&B, soul, and hip-hop elements. Reigne is an OPM album that she described as "songs influenced by the music, artists, and genres that I enjoy listening to," and included tracks that are melancholic, sensual, and poetic. Her crossover to film saw significant use of contemporary love ballads in her catalog of soundtrack themes, describing the music as "straightforward, earnest, and lyrically simple".

=== Voice and timbre ===
Velasquez is known for her use of vocal belting, and credits the vocal training she received from her father as a child:

That was in Leyte. A long time ago. I must've been 7 years old. It didn't feel like training; [my father] didn't force me to do it. He just took us to the beach for a picnic. We lived near the ocean. While I was swimming, he would ask me to sing ... I think he got the idea from Rocky Marciano, the boxer. He read that Rocky practiced, shadow-boxed in the water. [In the ring] there's no pressure so it's easier … but in the water, you have no choice but to punch harder. My Papa merely applied the same principle to singing.

Velasquez is a soprano and is often praised for her range and technical ability. Luciano of CNN Philippines complimented her "trademark and sometimes melismatic vocals" while Gonzales adds her singing is "strong, emotive, and confident". She has often been criticized, however, for the excessive use of belting and oversinging. Gonzales described Velasquez's timbre as "thin, unimpressive and unappealing at times", and said her singing is "aiming for a higher [note], [which] she did all too often". Velasquez said, "I don't mean to make any songs hard. It's just that when I'm on stage, with the adrenaline rush and all, you get excited. I do try to hold back [because] otherwise I'd be screaming the whole show, that's not good."

== Legacy and influence ==
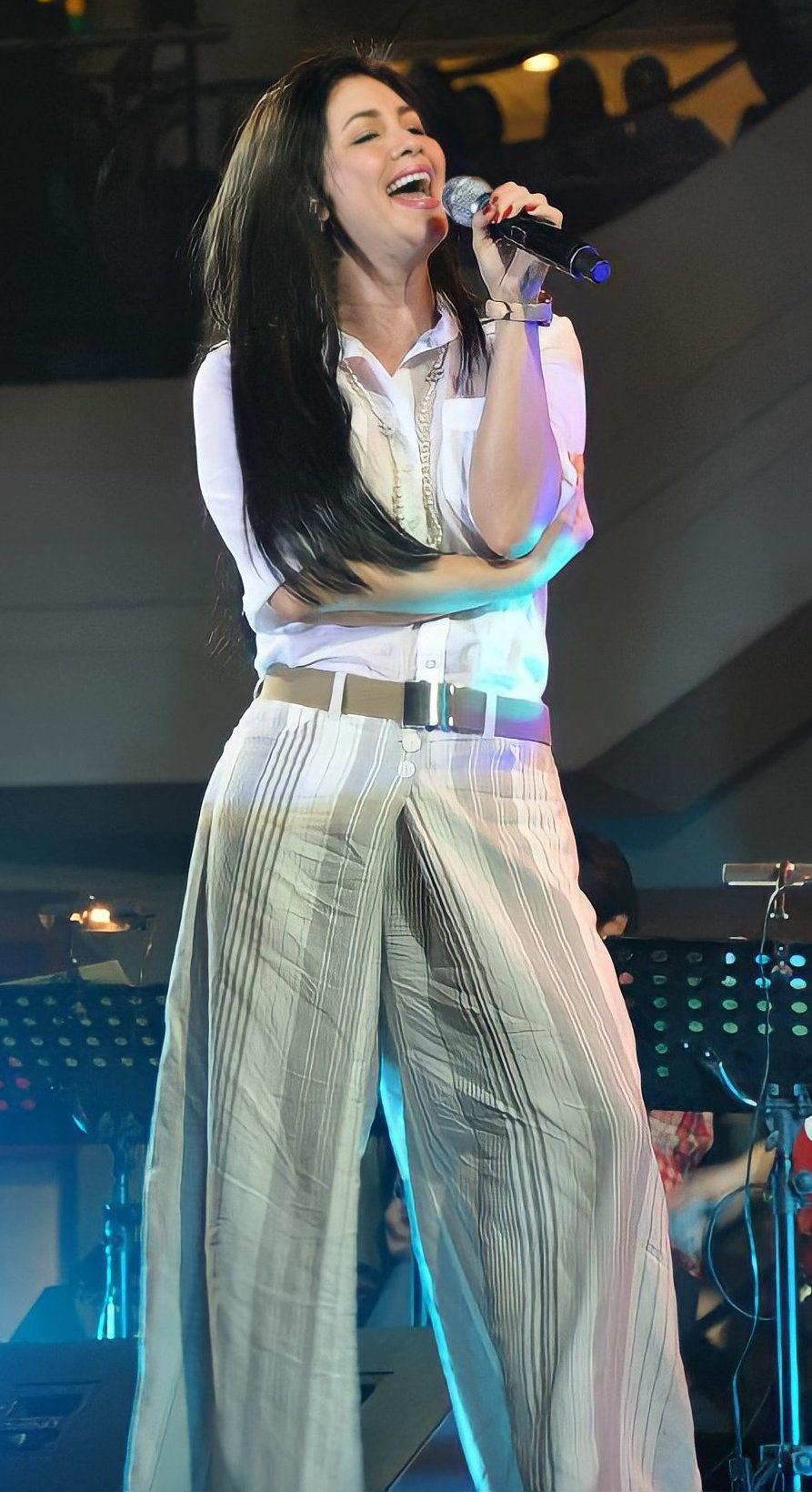
Velasquez performing during a promotional tour for Fantasy in 2010

Velasquez's vocal style and singing ability have significantly impacted Philippine popular and contemporary music. Critics have called her "Asia's Songbird" and she is often cited as one of Filipino music's most influential artists. According to Allan Policarpio of the Philippine Daily Inquirer, "Regine needed only to open her mouth and that celebrated voice would come out. She could sing seated, lying down or hoisted up in the air with a harness—no problem. And even when she was so sick she couldn't speak, she could still sing." Velasquez has also been recognized for playing a pivotal role in creating the "blue print" for becoming a "singing icon". Many critics complimented her work, often singling out Velasquez's influence. Luciano, writing for CNN Philippines, described her "legitimacy" as "enough to secure a space in pop culture" and said her musical career "continues to influence generations of OPM patrons and songbird wannabes up to this day", while according to The Philippine Star, "If one were to go by records and distinctions made, Regine Velasquez would win, hands down". She has often been regarded as a powerhouse for her performances and musical content.

Velasquez's use of vocal belting has been subject to scrutiny because young singers, including contestants on television talent shows, have imitated her singing technique. According to Nestor Torre Jr. of the Philippine Daily Inquirer, "The popularity of 'birit' [belting] started here with the amateur singing contests ... Then came Regine Velasquez, who also launched her own singing career the 'birit' way ... Trouble is, Regine's belting became so popular that her successor[s] ... imitated her." Manila Bulletin said, "Most of our top selling new female singers are still and mere parrots of [Velasquez] in terms of vocal acrobatics and predilection to show off her high range". Media critic Boy Abunda wrote, "Most of the young female singers currently making waves in the industry are cut from the same biritera [belter] cloth as Regine Velasquez."

Filipino pop, hip-hop, and R&B artists Aicelle Santos, Charice, Erik Santos, Jona Viray, Julie Anne San Jose, KZ Tandingan, Kyla, Mark Bautista, Morissette, Toni Gonzaga, and Yeng Constantino—among others—have cited Velasquez as an influence.

Velasquez's music has broadly influenced a younger generation of performers from reality television talent shows; Sarah Geronimo has stated Velasquez made her realize the value of hard work while Rachelle Ann Go and Angeline Quinto have both said Velasquez inspired them during their early years as aspiring singers. American Idol finalists Ramiele Malubay, Thia Megia, and Jessica Sanchez have expressed a desire to emulate Velasquez.

Velasquez has also been credited for her work and performances with international artists, including 98 Degrees, Alicia Keys, Coco Lee, Peabo Bryson, and Stephen Bishop. French composer Michel Legrand described working with Velasquez, saying "It's tough to sing a song after Barbra Streisand, I will tell you. But to sing with Regine is, I'm in heaven. She sings so well, she has such an extraordinary technical voice ... sensitive voice and talented expression." American singer Brian McKnight who co-headlined a concert with Velasquez, has complimented her singing, stating; "I got to sing onstage with Regine and it was one of the best experiences ever because she's one of the best singers I've ever heard."

== Other activities ==
=== Philanthropy ===
Velasquez has been involved with several charitable organizations. She became associated with the United Nations Children's Fund (UNICEF) in 2001 and worked on a documentary titled Speak Your Mind, which is about homeless children in Payatas, Quezon City, one of the Philippines' largest open dumpsites. The program was nominated for the UNICEF Child Rights Award.

One of Velasquez's highest-profile benefit concert appearances was in One Night with Regine, which she performed at the National Museum of the Philippines in support of the Bantay Bata Foundation, a child welfare organization. In 2005, Velasquez appeared in an episode of the lifestyle talk show Mel and Joey, and donated proceeds from an auction of her gowns to the GMA Kapuso Foundation's Christmas Give-a-Gift project. In 2009, Velasquez headlined a benefit television special called After The Rain: A Hopeful Christmas in the aftermath of Typhoon Ketsana (Ondoy). In October 2010, she became an ambassador for Operation Smile, a nonprofit organization that provides cleft lip and palate repair surgery to children worldwide. She recorded the theme "S.M.I.L.E.", which was written for the project and appears on her studio album Fantasy. In November 2013, proceeds from the sales of her album Hulog Ka Ng Langit were donated to the Philippine Red Cross in support of the Typhoon Haiyan (Yolanda) relief.

=== Product endorsements ===
Velasquez has worked on brand marketing initiatives for American fast-food restaurant chains Wendy's and KFC. She has signed advertising deals with several other brands, including Digitel, Lux, Nestlé Philippines, Nokia, and Smart Communications. Throughout 2005, she appeared as the face of the Department of Tourism's travel promotion campaign. In August 2009, working with the clothing and retail brand Bench, Velasquez promoted her fragrances for women, Reigne and Songbird. Velasquez has worked with fast-food restaurant chain Jollibee since 2018, and has appeared in several commercials with her son. They also had deals with Pampers, PLDT, and Nestlé's infant formula products. In February 2020, she partnered with beauty brand BYS and launched a cosmetics line, also named Reigne. She also became a spokesperson for Ariel laundry detergent and Vicks medicines.

== Personal life ==
Velasquez announced her relationship with singer-songwriter Ogie Alcasid in an article published by Yes! magazine in June 2007. On August 8, 2010, the couple announced their engagement, and in December, they married in Nasugbu, Batangas. She gave birth to their son, Nathaniel James, via caesarean section on November 8, 2011.

In 2013, Velasquez became a born-again Christian. It was revealed in March 2016 that she had suffered a miscarriage prior to her marriage to Alcasid and stated it was her reason for converting. Velasquez also said she had been attending Victory Christian Fellowship.

== Awards and recognition ==
Throughout her career, Velasquez has received many honors and awards, including MTV Asia's Favorite Artist Philippines in 2002 and 2003, and the Aliw Awards' Entertainer of the Year in 2007, 2009, and 2019. She has been the recipient of lifetime achievement awards, including the Awit Awards' Dangal ng Musikang Pilipino, the Star Awards for Music's Pilita Corrales Lifetime Achievement and Natatanging Alagad Ng Musika, FAMAS Awards' Golden Artist, and Myx Music's Magna Award.

Velasquez has sold more than seven million records in the Philippines and 1.5 million in Asia, making her the biggest-selling Filipino artist of all time. Eight of her albums have each sold over 200,000 copies. She was ranked first in Female Network's 2011 countdown of the "Top 25 Best Filipina Singers" and was included in Top 10 Asia magazine's list of "Ten Most Admired Female Singers in Asia". Velasquez has also received recognition for her work in television and film, such as the Box Office Queen award in 2002, the Star Awards for Television's Best Actress in 2002, and the Golden Screen Awards' Best Actress in 2013. She has received a total of 23 Awit Awards, 22 Box Office Entertainment Awards, 18 Aliw Awards, and 18 Star Awards for Music. In December 2007, Velasquez was honored with a star on the Philippines' Walk of Fame.

== Discography ==
- Regine (1987)
- Nineteen '90 (1989)
- Tagala Talaga (1991)
- Reason Enough (1993)
- Listen Without Prejudice (1994)
- My Love Emotion (1995)
- Retro (1996)
- Love Was Born on Christmas Day (1996)
- Drawn (1998)
- R2K (1999)
- Reigne (2001)
- Covers Volume 1 (2004)
- Covers Volume 2 (2006)
- Low Key (2008)
- Fantasy (2010)
- Hulog Ka ng Langit (2013)
- R3.0 (2017)
- Reginified (2024)
- Golden Hours (2026)

== Filmography ==
- Wanted Perfect Mother (1996)
- Do Re Mi (1996)
- Dahil May Isang Ikaw (1999)
- Kailangan Ko'y Ikaw (2000)
- Pangako Ikaw Lang (2001)
- Ikaw Lamang Hanggang Ngayon (2002)
- Pangarap Ko ang Ibigin Ka (2003)
- Till I Met You (2006)
- Paano Kita Iibigin (2007)
- Of All the Things (2012)
- Mrs. Recto (2015)
- Yours Truly, Shirley (2019)

== Concerts ==
Headlining concerts

- Narito Ako! (1990)
- In Season (1991)
- Music and Me (1993)
- Isang Pasasalamat (1996)
- Retro (1997)
- Drawn (1998)
- R2K: The Concert (2000)
- Songbird Sings the Classics (2001)
- R-15 (2001)
- One Night with Regine (2002)
- Reigning Still (2004)
- Twenty (2006)
- Silver (2013)
- R3.0 (2017)
- Freedom (2021)
- Regine Rocks (2023)
- Reset (2025)
- Finale (2026)

Co-headlining concerts

- Power of Two (with Kuh Ledesma) (1996)
- Celebration of Love (with Peabo Bryson and Jeffrey Osborne) (2000)
- Independent Women (with Jaya) (2001)
- Two for the Knight (with Brian McKnight) (2002)
- Songbird Sings Legrand (with Michel Legrand) (2003)
- Martin & Regine: The World Concert Tour (with Martin Nievera) (2003)
- The Songbird & The Songwriter (with Ogie Alcasid) (2004)
- Queens on Fire (with Pops Fernandez) (2005)
- Iconic (with Sharon Cuneta) (2019)
- Unified (with Sarah Geronimo) (2020)

Concert residencies

- Regine at the Movies (2001; 2018)
- Songbird Sings (2002)
- Songbird Sings Streisand (2003)
- Reflections (2005)
- Ang Ating Musika (2007)
- Regine at the Theater (2015)
- Solo (2023)

== See also ==
- List of best-selling albums in the Philippines
- List of Filipino singers
- List of Filipino actresses
- Music of the Philippines
- Philippine Association of the Record Industry
