= News.ABS-CBN.com =

Philippine website of ABS-CBN News

- Website type: News, Citizen Journalism, Social Media
- Available in: English; Filipino
- Headquarters: ABS-CBN Broadcasting Center, Diliman, Quezon City, {{{location_country}}}
- Area served: Worldwide
- Owners: ABS-CBN Corporation; ABS-CBN News and Current Affairs; ABS-CBN Digital Media
- Key people: Francis Toral (SVP/Head, Integrated News and Current Affairs); Nadia Trinidad (Head, ABS-CBN News Digital); Jaehwa Bernardo (Hallyu Corner, Korean Entertainment Stories)
- Website: abs-cbn.com/news
- Launched: 1997
- Current status: Active

News.ABS-CBN.com is a news website based in Quezon City, Philippines. It is owned by the media conglomerate ABS-CBN Corporation and it is predominantly targeted to the Filipino market. The website is maintained by the ABS-CBN Digital Media division of ABS-CBN while its contents are provided by ABS-CBN News. Aside from the website interface, users can also access its contents through its mobile app available in both iOS, android and Windows. The ABS-CBNnews.com app is also available on LG Smart TV. Although the domain address of the website was absorbed to the ABS-CBN.com website, it still retains the original logo. On the other hand, the old URL redirects to the current domain.

It is currently the top news website in the Philippines based on Alexa rankings and among the biggest Facebook publisher in the world according to NewsWhip. Its YouTube channel on the other hand has over two million subscribers and over one billion views, while its Twitter account has over two million followers.
