= List of awards and nominations received by Regine Velasquez =

Regine Velasquez awards and nominations
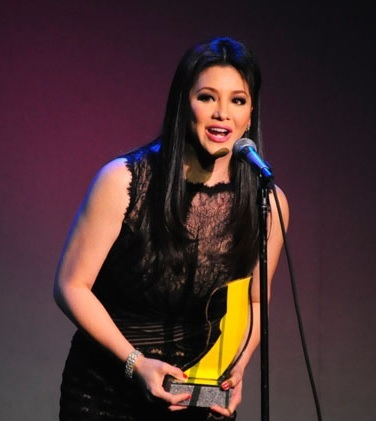
- Velasquez at the 2013 Golden Screen Awards
Awards and nominations
Award	Wins	Nominations
Aliw Awards	18	24
Anak TV Awards	3	3
Asian Television Awards	2	2
Awit Awards	23	51
Billboard Philippines Women in Music	2	2
Box Office Entertainment Awards	22	22
Catholic Mass Media Awards	2	2
EdukCircle Awards	4	4
FAMAS Awards	2	3
Filipino Music Awards	1	2
Golden Screen Awards	1	2
Katha Music Awards	1	4
KBP Golden Dove Award	1	1
Luna Awards	0	1
Manila Film Festival	0	1
Monster Radio Awards	2	2
MTV Asia Awards	2	3
MTV Pilipinas Music Award	3	5
Myx Music Awards	3	13
Star Awards for Movies	2	2
Star Awards for Music	18	54
Star Awards for Television	3	22
Wish 107.5 Music Awards	4	5
World Music Awards	0	3

Totals (Note: Certain award groups do not simply award one winner. They acknowledge several different recipients, have runners-up, and have third place. Since this is a specific recognition and is different from losing an award, runner-up mentions are considered wins in this award tally. For simplification and to avoid errors, each award in this list has been presumed to have had a prior nomination.)
- Wins: 119
- Nominations: 232

Regine Velasquez is a Filipino singer and actress who has received numerous awards and nominations for her contributions in music, film and television. She rose to prominence after winning the television talent show Ang Bagong Kampeon in 1984 and the Asia Pacific Singing Contest in 1989. Velasquez signed a record deal with Viva Records and released her self-titled debut album in 1987. Later that year, she was named Most Promising Female Entertainer at the 10th Aliw Awards for her work. Her succeeding albums Nineteen 90 (1990) and Tagala Talaga (1991) won her the awards for the Most Popular Female Entertainer at the Box Office Entertainment Award ceremonies in 1991 and 1992.

Reason Enough (1993), Velasquez's fourth studio album, included the single "Sana Maulit Muli". She won Awit Awards for Best Performance by a Female Recording Artist for the song, and Best Performance by a Duet for "Muli" with Gary Valenciano. Velasquez's first international album, Listen Without Prejudice, was released in May 1994. Its lead single "In Love With You" was nominated for two Perfect 10 Music Awards, including Favorite Performance in a Song. She had full conceptual and creative control as the executive producer of her tenth studio album R2K, which was released in November 1999. In support of the album, she headlined the R2K Concert in April 2000 and won Best Female Major Concert Act at the Aliw Awards for the production. Velasquez was also named the Most Popular Female Entertainer at 30th Box Office Entertainment Awards, making her the first artist in the award show's history to receive the honor for the tenth consecutive year.

Velasquez released "You Are My Song", the main theme of her film Wanted Perfect Mother (1996). The song won Best Movie Theme Song and Best Ballad Recording at the Awit Awards in 1997. She also starred in the motion picture Kailangan Ko'y Ikaw (2000) and released the soundtrack's eponymous lead single, which won the FAMAS and Star Award for Best Movie Theme Song, as well as her second Awit Award for Best Performance by a Female Recording Artist in 2001. Velasquez's eleventh studio album Reigne was released in November 2001; two of its singles, "To Reach You" and "Sa Aking Pag-iisa", garnered her consecutive wins as Favorite Artist Philippines at the 2002 and 2003 MTV Asia Awards. Velasquez then appeared in the romantic comedies Pangako Ikaw Lang (2001) and Of All the Things (2013), for which she was awarded the Box Office Queen and the Golden Screen Award for Best Actress, respectively.

Velasquez has also received recognition for her work in television; she has accrued three Star Awards for Best Actress in 2002, Best Female Host in 2005 and Best Talent Search Program Host in 2006. In December 2016, she was included in People Asia magazine's annual People of the Year list. In addition to competitive awards, Velasquez has been honored with many lifetime achievement awards, including the Awit Awards' Dangal ng Musikang Pilipino, the Star Awards for Music's Pilita Corales Lifetime Achievement Award, FAMAS Awards' Golden Artist, and Myx Music's Magna Award.

== Awards and nominations ==
Key
†	Indicates non-competitive categories

Awards and nominations received by Regine Velasquez
Award	Year (Note: Indicates the year of ceremony. Each year is linked to the article about the awards held that year, wherever possible.)	Recipient(s) and nominee(s)	Category	Result	Ref(s)
Aliw Awards	1987	Regine	Most Promising Female Entertainer	Won	
Aliw Awards	2000	R2K: The Concert	Best Female Major Concert Act	Won	
Aliw Awards	2001	R-15	Best Female Major Concert Act	Won	
Aliw Awards	2002	Two for the Knight	Best Female Major Concert Act	Won	
Aliw Awards	2003	Martin & Regine: The World Concert Tour	Best Female Major Concert Act	Won	
Aliw Awards	2003	Martin & Regine: The World Concert Tour	Best Major Concert Collaboration	Won	
Aliw Awards	2004	The Songbird & The Songwriter	Best Performance in a Concert (Female)	Won	
Aliw Awards	2005	Reigning Still	Best Female Major Concert Act	Nominated	
Aliw Awards	2005	Queens on Fire	Best Major Concert Collaboration	Nominated	
Aliw Awards	2007	Twenty	Best Female Major Concert Act	Won	
Aliw Awards	2007	Twenty	Entertainer of the Year	Won	
Aliw Awards	2009	Divas 4 Divas	Best Female Major Concert Act	Won	
Aliw Awards	2009	Divas 4 Divas	Best Major Concert Collaboration	Won	
Aliw Awards	2009	Divas 4 Divas	Entertainer of the Year	Won	
Aliw Awards	2012	Mr. & Mrs. A	Best Major Concert Collaboration	Nominated	
Aliw Awards	2013	Foursome	Best Major Concert Collaboration	Nominated	
Aliw Awards	2016	Royals	Best Major Concert Collaboration	Won	
Aliw Awards	2017	R3.0	Best Female Major Concert Act	Nominated	
Aliw Awards	2019	Iconic	Entertainer Of The Year	Won	
Aliw Awards	2019	Iconic	Best Collaboration in a Concert	Won	
Aliw Awards	2020	Unified	Best Collaboration in a Concert	Won	
Aliw Awards	2023	Solo	Best Female Major Concert Act	Nominated	
Aliw Awards	2023	Regine Velasquez	Lifetime Achievement Award †	Won	
Aliw Awards	2025	Reset	Best Female Artist in a Major Concert	Won	
Anak TV Awards	2014	Sarap Diva	Anak TV Seal	Won	
Anak TV Awards	2016	Sarap Diva	Anak TV Seal	Won	
Anak TV Awards	2023	Regine Velasquez	Anak TV Seal	Won	
Asian Television Awards	2002	One Night with Regine	Best Music Program	Won	
Asian Television Awards	2003	Back To Back Christmas	Best Entertainment Special	Won	
Awit Awards	1994	"Sana Maulit Muli"	Best Performance By A Female Recording Artist	Won	
Awit Awards	1994	"Muli" (with Gary Valenciano)	Best Performance by a Duet	Won	
Awit Awards	1995	"Forever" (with Martin Nievera)	Best Performance by a Duet	Won	
Awit Awards	1997	"You Are My Song"	Best Movie Theme Song Recording	Won	
Awit Awards	1997	"You Are My Song"	Best Ballad Recording	Won	
Awit Awards	2001	"Habang May Buhay" (with Jaya)	Best Performance by a Duet	Won	
Awit Awards	2001	"Kailangan Ko'y Ikaw"	Best Performance By A Female Recording Artist	Won	
Awit Awards	2001	"Kailangan Ko'y Ikaw"	Best Movie Theme Song Recording	Won	
Awit Awards	2001	"Kailangan Ko'y Ikaw"	Best Ballad Recording	Won	
Awit Awards	2004	"Pangarap Ko Ang Ibigin Ka"	Best Movie Theme Song Recording	Won	
Awit Awards	2004	"Magpakailanpaman" (with Ogie Alcasid)	Best Movie Theme Song Recording	Nominated	
Awit Awards	2004	"Tell Me" (with Ariel Rivera)	Best Performance By A Duet	Nominated	
Awit Awards	2004	"Tell Me" (with Ariel Rivera)	Best Musical Arrangement	Won	
Awit Awards	2004	"Tell Me" (with Ariel Rivera)	Best Vocal Arrangement	Won	
Awit Awards	2007	"A Single Soul" (with Reuben Laurente)	Best R&B Music	Won	
Awit Awards	2007	"A Single Soul" (with Reuben Laurente)	Best Performance By A Duet	Nominated	
Awit Awards	2007	"Kailangan Ko, Kailangan Mo" (with Martin Nievera)	Best Performance By A Duet	Nominated	
Awit Awards	2007	"Till I Met You"	Best Performance By A Female Recording Artist	Nominated	
Awit Awards	2007	"Di Na Nag-Iisa"	Best Song Written for Movie/TV/Stage Play	Nominated	
Awit Awards	2008	"Paano Kita Iibigin" (with Piolo Pascual)	Best Song Written for Movie/TV/Stage Play	Won	
Awit Awards	2008	"Paano Kita Iibigin" (with Piolo Pascual)	Best Performance By A Duet	Nominated	
Awit Awards	2009	"And I Love You So"	People's Choice Best Performance by a Female Recording Artist	Won	
Awit Awards	2009	"And I Love You So"	Best Performance by a Female Recording Artist	Nominated	
Awit Awards	2009	Low Key	Best Album Package	Nominated	
Awit Awards	2011	"You Don't Know"	Best Performance by a Female Recording Artist	Nominated	
Awit Awards	2011	Fantasy	Album of the Year	Nominated	
Awit Awards	2012	Regine Velasquez	Dangal Ng Musikang Pilipino Award †	Won	
Awit Awards	2013	"Lipad Ng Pangarap" (with Angeline Quinto)	Best Inspirational/Religious Recording	Won	
Awit Awards	2013	"Lipad Ng Pangarap" (with Angeline Quinto)	Best Collaboration	Nominated	
Awit Awards	2014	"Araw, Ulap, Langit"	Best Performance by a Female Recording Artist	Nominated	
Awit Awards	2014	Hulog Ka Ng Langit	Best Selling Album of the Year	Nominated	
Awit Awards	2014	"Hulog Ka Ng Langit"	Best Ballad Recording	Nominated	
Awit Awards	2014	"Nathaniel (Gift of God)"	Best Inspirational/Religious Recording	Won	
Awit Awards	2014	"Hele ni Inay"	Best Christmas Recording	Won	
Awit Awards	2014	"Nandiyan Palagi"	Best Song Written for Movie/TV/Stage Play	Nominated	
Awit Awards	2016	"Somewhere Over The Rainbow" (with Jed Madela)	Best Collaboration	Nominated	
Awit Awards	2018	"Hugot"	Best Performance by a Female Recording Artist	Nominated	
Awit Awards	2018	R3.0	Album of the Year	Nominated	
Awit Awards	2018	"Skybound"	Best Inspirational Recording	Nominated	
Awit Awards	2018	"Hugot"	Favorite Female Artist	Won	
Awit Awards	2018	R3.0	Favorite Album of The Year	Won	
Awit Awards	2019	"Pagbigyang Muli" (with Erik Santos)	Best Collaboration	Nominated	
Awit Awards	2020	"Unbreakable" (with Moira Dela Torre)	Best Collaboration	Nominated	
Awit Awards	2020	"Unbreakable" (with Moira Dela Torre)	Best Ballad Recording	Nominated	
Awit Awards	2020	"Unbreakable" (with Moira Dela Torre)	Best Pop Recording	Nominated	
Awit Awards	2020	"Unbreakable" (with Moira Dela Torre)	Best Song Written for Movie/TV/Stage Play	Nominated	
Awit Awards	2020	"Unbreakable" (with Moira Dela Torre)	Best Vocal Arrangement	Nominated	
Awit Awards	2021	"Mahal Ko O Mahal Ako"	Best Performance by a Female Recording Artist	Nominated	
Awit Awards	2022	"Di Ka Nag-iisa"	Best Song Written for Movie/TV/Stage Play	Won	
Awit Awards	2022	"Di Ka Nag-iisa"	Best Performance by a Female Recording Artist	Nominated	
Awit Awards	2025	"Ulit Ulit"	Best Original Soundtrack	Won	
Billboard Philippines Women in Music	2024	Regine Velasquez	Powerhouse Award †	Won	
Billboard Philippines Women in Music	2026	Regine Velasquez	Woman Of The Year	Won	
Box Office Entertainment Awards	1991	Nineteen 90	Most Popular Female Entertainer	Won	
Box Office Entertainment Awards	1992	Tagala Talaga	Most Popular Female Entertainer	Won	
Box Office Entertainment Awards	1993	Reason Enough	Most Popular Female Entertainer	Won	
Box Office Entertainment Awards	1994	Listen Without Prejudice	Most Popular Female Entertainer	Won	
Box Office Entertainment Awards	1995	My Love Emotion	Most Popular Female Entertainer	Won	
Box Office Entertainment Awards	1996	Retro	Most Popular Female Entertainer	Won	
Box Office Entertainment Awards	1997	Do Re Mi	Most Popular Female Entertainer	Won	
Box Office Entertainment Awards	1998	Drawn	Most Popular Female Entertainer	Won	
Box Office Entertainment Awards	1999	R2K	Most Popular Female Entertainer	Won	
Box Office Entertainment Awards	2000	Kailangan Ko'y Ikaw	Most Popular Female Entertainer	Won	
Box Office Entertainment Awards	2001	Regine Live: Songbird Sings the Classics	Most Popular Female Entertainer	Won	
Box Office Entertainment Awards	2002	Pangako Ikaw Lang	Box Office Queen	Won	
Box Office Entertainment Awards	2003	Pangarap Ko Ang Ibigin Ka	Female Entertainer of the Year	Won	
Box Office Entertainment Awards	2004	Covers Vol., 1	Female Entertainer of the Year	Won	
Box Office Entertainment Awards	2005	Reflections	Female Entertainer of the Year	Won	
Box Office Entertainment Awards	2007	Forever After	Concert Queen	Won	
Box Office Entertainment Awards	2015	Voices of Love	Female Concert Performer of the Year	Won	
Box Office Entertainment Awards	2016	Ultimate	Female Concert Performer of the Year	Won	
Box Office Entertainment Awards	2017	Royals	Female Concert Performer of the Year	Won	
Box Office Entertainment Awards	2018	#paMORE	Female Concert Performer of the Year	Won	
Box Office Entertainment Awards	2019	Regine at the Movies	Female Concert Performer of the Year	Won	
Box Office Entertainment Awards	2020	"Ikaw Ang Aking Mahal"	Female Recording Artist Of The Year	Won	
Catholic Mass Media Awards	2014	Hulog Ka Ng Langit	Best Secular Album	Won	
Catholic Mass Media Awards	2014	"Hulog Ka Ng Langit"	Best Inspirational Song	Won	
EdukCircle Awards	2015	Ultimate	Most Influential Concert Performer of the Year	Won	
EdukCircle Awards	2016	Royals	Most Influential Concert Performer of the Year	Won	
EdukCircle Awards	2018	R3.0	Most Influential Concert Performer of the Year	Won	
EdukCircle Awards	2019	The Songbird and The Song Horse	Most Influential Concert Performer of the Year	Won	
FAMAS Awards	2001	"Kailangan Ko'y Ikaw"	Best Movie Theme Song of the Year	Won	
FAMAS Awards	2006	Regine Velasquez	Golden Artist Award †	Won	
FAMAS Awards	2008	Paano Kita Iibigin	Best Actress	Nominated	
Filipino Music Awards	2005	Reset	Concert of the Year	Nominated	
Filipino Music Awards	2006	Regine Velasquez	Lifetime Achievement Award †	Won	
Golden Screen Awards	2004	Pangarap Ko ang Ibigin Ka	Best Actress in a Motion Picture – Comedy or Musical	Nominated	
Golden Screen Awards	2013	Of All The Things	Best Actress in a Motion Picture – Comedy or Musical	Won	
Katha Music Awards	1996	You've Made Me Stronger	Best Female Pop Vocals	Won	
Katha Music Awards	2000	Sabihin Mo Lang	Record Of The Year	Nominated	
Katha Music Awards	2002	Hanggang Ngayon (with Ogie Alcasid)	Pop Vocal Collaboration	Nominated	
Katha Music Awards	2002	One (with Ogie Alcasid, Lani Misalucha, and Jaya)	Pop Vocal Collaboration	Nominated	
KBP Golden Dove Award	2002	One Night with Regine	Best TV Special	Won	
Luna Awards	2008	Paano Kita Iibigin	Best Actress	Nominated	
Manila Film Festival	2003	Pangarap Ko ang Ibigin Ka	Best Actress	Nominated	
Monster Radio Awards	1996	You Are My Song	Female Solo Performance of the Year	Won	
Monster Radio Awards	1998	Drawn	Best Female Solo Artist of the Year	Won	
MTV Asia Awards	2002	"To Reach You"	Favorite Artist Philippines	Won	
MTV Asia Awards	2003	"Sa Aking Pag-iisa (Remix)"	Favorite Artist Philippines	Won	
MTV Asia Awards	2004	"Pangarap Ko Ang Ibigin Ka"	Favorite Artist Philippines	Nominated	
MTV Pilipinas Music Award	2001	"Lost Without Your Love"	Favorite Female Artist in a Video	Won	
MTV Pilipinas Music Award	2002	"To Reach You"	Favorite Female Artist in a Video	Nominated	
MTV Pilipinas Music Award	2002	"To Reach You"	Favorite Song	Nominated	
MTV Pilipinas Music Award	2003	"Sa Aking Pag-iisa (Remix)"	Favorite Female Artist in a Video	Won	
MTV Pilipinas Music Award	2003	"Sa Aking Pag-iisa (Remix)"	Favorite Song	Won	
Myx Music Awards	2007	"Bakit Ba Inibig Ka" (with Erik Santos)	Favorite Collaboration	Won	
Myx Music Awards	2007	"Hindi Ko Na Kaya Masaktan Pa" (with Ogie Alcasid)	Favorite Collaboration	Nominated	
Myx Music Awards	2008	"Paano Kita Iibigin" (with Piolo Pascual)	Favorite Collaboration	Nominated	
Myx Music Awards	2008	"Paano Kita Iibigin" (with Piolo Pascual)	Favorite Myx Live Performance	Nominated	
Myx Music Awards	2009	"Tell Me That You Love Me"	Favorite Mellow Video	Nominated	
Myx Music Awards	2009	Low Key	Favorite Mellow Artist	Nominated	
Myx Music Awards	2010	"And I Love You So"	Favorite Mellow Video	Nominated	
Myx Music Awards	2011	"You Don't Know"	Favorite Mellow Video	Nominated	
Myx Music Awards	2011	Regine Velasquez	Magna Award †	Won	
Myx Music Awards	2015	"Takipsilim" (with Gloc-9)	Favorite Collaboration	Won	
Myx Music Awards	2015	"Takipsilim" (with Gloc-9)	Best Music Video	Nominated	
Myx Music Awards	2017	"Makitang Kang Muli" (with Ebe Dancel)	Favorite Remake	Nominated	
Myx Music Awards	2019	"Pagbigyang Muli" (with Erik Santos)	Remake of the Year	Nominated	
Star Awards for Movies	2001	"Kailangan Ko'y Ikaw"	Best Movie Theme Song of the Year	Won	
Star Awards for Movies	2008	Paano Kita Iibigin	Darling of the Press	Won	
Star Awards for Music	2009	Low Key	Female Recording Artist of the Year	Won	
Star Awards for Music	2009	Low Key	Revival Album Of The Year	Won	
Star Awards for Music	2009	Low Key	Female Pop Artist of the Year	Nominated	
Star Awards for Music	2009	Low Key	Album Cover Design	Nominated	
Star Awards for Music	2009	"And I Love You So"	Music Video Of The Year	Nominated	
Star Awards for Music	2011	Fantasy	Female Recording Artist of the Year	Nominated	
Star Awards for Music	2011	Fantasy	Music Video of the Year	Nominated	
Star Awards for Music	2011	Fantasy	Female Pop Artist of the Year	Nominated	
Star Awards for Music	2012	Mr. & Mrs. A	Concert of the Year	Nominated	
Star Awards for Music	2012	Mr. & Mrs. A	Female Concert Performer of the Year	Nominated	
Star Awards for Music	2012	Regine Velasquez	Natatanging Alagad Ng Musika †	Won	
Star Awards for Music	2013	Silver	Female Concert Performer of the Year	Won	
Star Awards for Music	2013	Silver	Concert of the Year	Nominated	
Star Awards for Music	2013	Foursome	Female Concert Performer of the Year	Nominated	
Star Awards for Music	2013	Foursome	Concert of the Year	Won	
Star Awards for Music	2014	Hulog Ka Ng Langit	Album Cover Concept and Design of the Year	Won	
Star Awards for Music	2014	Hulog Ka Ng Langit	Album of the Year	Nominated	
Star Awards for Music	2014	Hulog Ka Ng Langit	Female Recording Artist of the Year	Nominated	
Star Awards for Music	2014	Hulog Ka Ng Langit	Female Pop Artist of the Year	Nominated	
Star Awards for Music	2014	Voices of Love	Concert of the Year	Nominated	
Star Awards for Music	2014	Voices of Love	Female Concert Performer of the Year	Nominated	
Star Awards for Music	2015	Ultimate	Female Concert Performer of the Year	Won	
Star Awards for Music	2015	Ultimate	Concert of the Year	Won	
Star Awards for Music	2015	"Push Mo Yan 'Teh" (with Vice Ganda)	Novelty Song of the Year	Nominated	
Star Awards for Music	2016	Royals	Female Concert Performer of the Year	Nominated	
Star Awards for Music	2016	Royals	Concert of the Year	Nominated	
Star Awards for Music	2018	"Hugot"	Female Recording Artist Of The Year	Nominated	
Star Awards for Music	2018	R3.0	Revival Album Of The Year	Nominated	
Star Awards for Music	2018	R3.0	Female Concert Performer Of The Year	Nominated	
Star Awards for Music	2018	R3.0	Concert Of The Year	Nominated	
Star Awards for Music	2018	#paMORE	Concert Of The Year	Won	
Star Awards for Music	2019	"Ikaw Ang Aking Mahal"	Female Recording Artist Of The Year	Nominated	
Star Awards for Music	2019	"Pagbigyang Muli" (with Erik Santos)	Collaboration Of The Year	Nominated	
Star Awards for Music	2019	Regine at the Movies	Female Concert Performer Of The Year	Nominated	
Star Awards for Music	2019	Regine at the Movies	Concert Of The Year	Nominated	
Star Awards for Music	2019	Regine Velasquez	Pilita Corales Lifetime Achievement Award †	Won	
Star Awards for Music	2021	"I Am Beautiful"	Female Recording Artist Of The Year	Won	
Star Awards for Music	2021	"I Am Beautiful"	Music Video Of The Year	Nominated	
Star Awards for Music	2021	Iconic	Female Concert Performer Of The Year	Won	
Star Awards for Music	2021	Iconic	Concert Of The Year	Nominated	
Star Awards for Music	2022	"Mahal Ko O Mahal Ako"	Female Recording Artist of the Year	Nominated	
Star Awards for Music	2022	"Mahal Ko O Mahal Ako"	Revival Recording of the Year	Nominated	
Star Awards for Music	2022	Unified	Female Concert Performer of the Year	Won	
Star Awards for Music	2022	Unified	Concert of the Year	Won	
Star Awards for Music	2022	Live for Jesus (with Ogie Alcasid, Jaya, and Gary Goditoc)	Inspirational Song of the Year	Nominated	
Star Awards for Music	2023	Freedom	Female Concert Performer of the Year	Won	
Star Awards for Music	2023	Freedom	Concert of the Year	Won	
Star Awards for Music	2023	"Hoy Love You" (with Ogie Alcasid)	Collaboration of the Year	Nominated	
Star Awards for Music	2024	Regine Rocks	Female Concert Performer of the Year	Won	
Star Awards for Music	2024	Regine Rocks	Concert of the Year	Nominated	
Star Awards for Music	2024	"Nag-Iisa Lang"	Female Recording Artist of the Year	Nominated	
Star Awards for Music	2026	Regine Rocks: The Repeat	Concert of the Year	Nominated	
Star Awards for Music	2026	Regine Rocks: The Repeat	Female Concert Performer of the Year	Won	
Star Awards for Music	2026	"Di Sinasadya"	Revival Recording of the Year	Nominated	
Star Awards for Television	2002	Maalaala Mo Kaya	Best Single Performance by an Actress in a Lead Role	Won	
Star Awards for Television	2005	SOP	Best Female TV Host	Won	
Star Awards for Television	2006	Pinoy Pop Superstar	Best Talent Search Program Host	Won	
Star Awards for Television	2006	SOP	Best Female TV Host	Nominated	
Star Awards for Television	2007	Pinoy Pop Superstar	Best Talent Search Program Host	Nominated	
Star Awards for Television	2007	SOP	Best Female TV Host	Nominated	
Star Awards for Television	2008	SOP	Best Female TV Host	Nominated	
Star Awards for Television	2009	Celebrity Duets	Best Talent Search Program Host	Nominated	
Star Awards for Television	2009	SOP	Best Female TV Host	Nominated	
Star Awards for Television	2010	Celebrity Duets	Best Talent Search Program Host	Nominated	
Star Awards for Television	2010	SOP	Best Female TV Host	Nominated	
Star Awards for Television	2011	Party Pilipinas	Best Female TV Host	Nominated	
Star Awards for Television	2012	Party Pilipinas	Best Female TV Host	Nominated	
Star Awards for Television	2013	Sarap Diva	Best Celebrity Talk Show Host	Nominated	
Star Awards for Television	2013	H.O.T. TV	Best Magazine Show Host	Nominated	
Star Awards for Television	2015	Bet ng Bayan	Best Talent Search Program Host	Nominated	
Star Awards for Television	2016	Sarap Diva	Best Celebrity Talk Show Host	Nominated	
Star Awards for Television	2017	Full House Tonight	Best Female TV Host	Nominated	
Star Awards for Television	2019	ASAP Natin 'To	Best Female TV Host	Nominated	
Star Awards for Television	2019	The Clash	Best Magazine Show Host	Nominated	
Star Awards for Television	2021	ASAP Natin 'To	Best Female TV Host	Nominated	
Star Awards for Television	2023	ASAP Natin 'To	Best Female TV Host	Nominated	
Wish 107.5 Music Awards	2018	Hugot	Ballad Song of the Year	Nominated	
Wish 107.5 Music Awards	2018	Araw Gabi	Bronze Wishclusive Elite Circle	Won	
Wish 107.5 Music Awards	2020	Araw Gabi	Silver Wishclusive Elite Circle	Won	
Wish 107.5 Music Awards	2022	Araw Gabi	Gold Wishclusive Elite Circle	Won	
Wish 107.5 Music Awards	2023	Regine Velasquez	KDR Icon of Musical Excellence †	Won	
World Music Awards	2013	Regine Velasquez	World's Best Entertainer of the Year	Nominated	
World Music Awards	2013	Regine Velasquez	World's Best Female Artist	Nominated	
World Music Awards	2013	Regine Velasquez	World's Best Live Act	Nominated	
