= One Night with Regine =

Benefit concert by Regine Velasquez

- Benefit concert by Regine Velasquez
- Location: Rizal Park, Manila City, Philippines
- Venue: National Museum of Anthropology
- Start date: April 26, 2002
- No. of shows: 1

Regine Velasquez concert chronology
- Two for the Knight (2002); One Night with Regine (2002); Songbird Sings (2002)

One Night with Regine was a benefit concert by Filipino entertainer Regine Velasquez that took place on April 26, 2002 at the National Museum of Anthropology in Rizal Park, Manila. The charity event was organized by ABS-CBN Foundation to raise funds in support of the Bantay Bata child welfare program, which aimed to promote awareness of disadvantaged and at-risk children. The proceeds were donated to benefit the development of a children's village in Velasquez's hometown of Bulacan.

Performed in front of the National Museum, the outdoor concert featured the 85-member ensemble of the San Miguel Philharmonic Orchestra accompanied by the San Miguel Master Chorale. Ryan Cayabyab served as conductor and musical director. The set list included songs taken from Velasquez's albums, as well as covers of OPM tracks and Broadway musical themes from the West Side Story, Mamma Mia!, Sunset Boulevard, and Les Misérables.

One Night with Regine received acclaim from critics, who praised Velasquez's vocal performance and the concert's aesthetics. The show was broadcast as a television special on June 2, 2002, airing on ABS-CBN. It was awarded Best Musical Program at the 7th Asian Television Awards and Best TV Special at the 12th KBP Golden Dove Awards.

== Background and development ==
Bantay Bata is a child protection program of the ABS-CBN Foundation which was founded in 1997 by philanthropist Gina Lopez. It provides social services to disadvantaged and at-risk children, mainly through a national emergency hotline that responds to reports of child abuse. The program includes services such as rescue operations, legal assistance, counselling, and community outreach. In early 2002, Lopez was involved with the development and construction of an accommodation center in Norzagaray, Bulacan, which would serve as a shelter to at least 200 children under the care of Bantay Bata. Lopez's hope was to raise funds in support of the project's completion. One Night with Regine was conceived after ABS-CBN network approached Velasquez for a television project in the summer of 2002.

I've been talking with people at Channel 2 [ABS-CBN], and they wanted to give me a summer special. So I said instead of doing a summer special, why don't I do a live concert, and I wanted to have a beneficiary, which they chose, Bantay Bata.

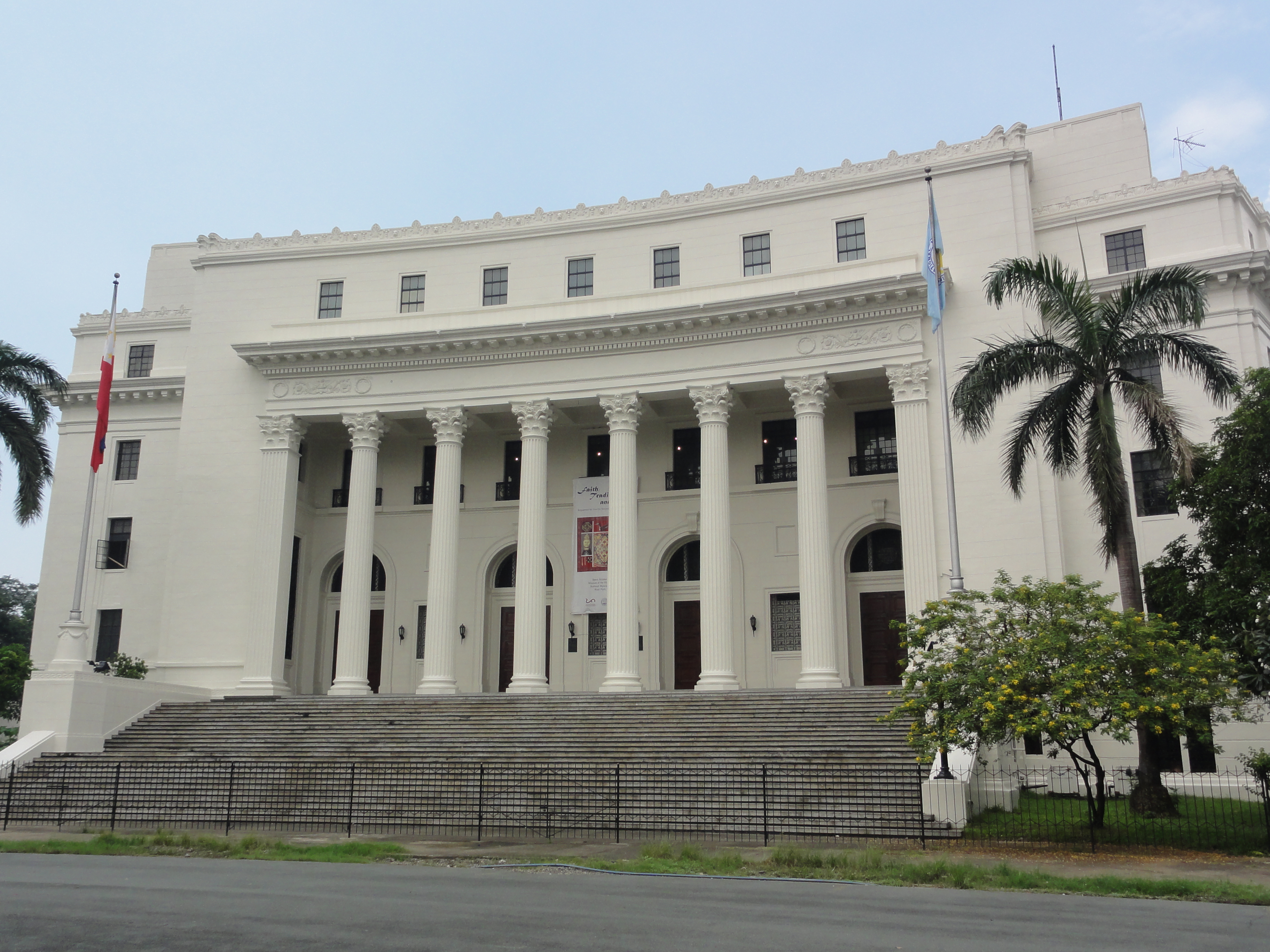
The National Museum of Anthropology at Rizal Park in Manila, where the concert took place

Having previously staged benefit concerts in support of the National Kidney Foundation Singapore and the Hong Kong AIDS Foundation, Velasquez committed to the fundraising project and spoke of having a "soft spot for the center" through her roots as a native of Bulacan. She was drawn to the idea of performing at an outdoor venue and suggested the National Museum of Anthropology, which was one of the filming locations of Ikaw Lamang Hanggang Ngayon, a comedy drama she starred in that year. After production of the film was completed, she presented the concept to ABS-CBN, with the museum selected as another beneficiary of the show. Velasquez campaigned to showcase the museum and its exhibits, saying, "I think it would be nice so that more people would come and visit".

By April, Ryan Cayabyab was announced as the show's musical director. The concert also featured an 85-member ensemble of the San Miguel Philharmonic Orchestra accompanied by the San Miguel Master Chorale. Johnny Manahan was chosen as television director, while guest performers included Ogie Alcasid, Carol Banawa, Bituin Escalante, Roselle Nava, and RJ Rosales. The entrance façade of the National Museum served as the main stage, with the orchestra and choir positioned at the grand stairway. A large-scale design of the letter "R" accentuated the pillars of the museum's left section.

== Concert synopsis ==
The concert opened with the San Miguel Philharmonic Orchestra playing an overture rendition of Velasquez's songs "Narito Ako", "Kung Maibabalik Ko Lang", and "Buhay ng Buhay Ko". (Note: One Night with Regine was aired as a television special on June 2, 2002 on ABS-CBN.) At the conclusion of the instrumental introduction, Velasquez is heard singing in a capella the first verses of Joe Raposo's "Sing". The number continued with the orchestra playing as Velasquez emerged from the museum's entrance doors making her way down the stairway to centerstage. "Sing" was mashed with the big band track "Sing, Sing, Sing (With a Swing)" taking the latter's horn motif and incorporating the chorus lines. She followed this with a performance of "Dadalhin" and sang a Spanish version of her single "Ikaw". RJ Rosales joined Velasquez to perform a medley of Broadway musical themes, such as "Tonight", "As If We Never Said Goodbye", "I Dreamed a Dream", "Memory", and "All I Ask of You". This was followed with a performance of "Say That You Love Me". For the next number, Velasquez sang a medley of her cover songs, "You Were There", "I'll Never Love This Way Again", "Fallin", and "The Long and Winding Road". She introduced Carol Banawa, Bituin Escalante, and Roselle Nava before leaving offstage. The singers performed Velasquez's single "Sana Maulit Muli", before she rejoined them for a performance of The Emotions's "Best of My Love".

Velasquez returned onstage and sang "Pagdating Ng Panahon" accompanied by the San Miguel Master Chorale. Velasquez then sat atop the piano and performed a medley of OPM songs with conductor Ryan Cayabyab, which included "Gaano Ko Ikaw Kamahal", "Saan Ka Man Naroroon", "Ang Pipit", "Kahit Konting Pagtingin", and "Sa Ugoy ng Duyan".The performance of "On the Wings of Love" saw Velasquez elevated at the tip of the letter "R" stage design structure. In the next segment, Velasquez began a medley of "At Seventeen", "Sandra", and "I've Never Been to Me". The setlist continued with a medley of her movie themes "Kailangan Ko'y Ikaw", "Pangako", and "Hanggang Ngayon" where she was joined by Ogie Alcasid. She followed this with a tribute number to Swedish pop group ABBA. "Sometime Somewhere" was performed after that, before continuing with Petula Clark's "You and I" and "Fill the World With Love". The closing act saw Velasquez singing the Yentl theme "A Piece of Sky". She then sat by the stairs and ended the show with an encore performance of "What Kind of Fool Am I?".

== Reception and recordings ==
The concert garnered generally positive reviews from critics. Ann Montemar-Oriondo of The Philippine Star complimented the outdoor staging of the show and praised Velasquez's performance as "world-class". She further added, "A Regine Velasquez concert invariably becomes a big musical event, but even by [Velasquez's] consistent standard, [One Night with Regine] may well linger in music lovers memories far longer than the rest." Similarly, Ricardo Ortega of the Philippine Daily Inquirer described the show as "memorable" and opined that Velasquez did not fall short of her audience's expectations. "Of course, [Velasquez] would not disappoint those who hunger for her signature high notes," he said.

Critics agreed that the highlight of the night was Velasquez's performance of an orchestral arrangement of "On the Wings of Love". Ortega wrote that, "[Velasquez] stood tall and mighty on the elevated left side of the huge letter 'R' at the top of the National Museum stairs and belted out a dramatically arranged On the Wings of Love." Meanwhile, Montemar-Oriondo cited the number as "dramatic" and an "awesome take". In retrospect, Velasquez has said in a 2021 interview that the concert was her "most memorable to this day" and added that there has not been a similar type of show staged since.

One Night with Regine was aired as a television special on June 2, 2002, on ABS-CBN. It was awarded Best Musical Program at the 7th Asian Television Awards and Best TV Special at the 12th KBP Golden Dove Awards.

== Set list ==
This set list is taken from the television special One Night with Regine.

1. "Sing" / "Sing, Sing, Sing (With a Swing)"
2. "Dadalhin"
3. "Ikaw"
4. "Tonight" / "As If We Never Said Goodbye" / "I Dreamed a Dream" / "Memory" / "All I Ask of You" (with RJ Rosales)
5. "Say That You Love Me"
6. "You Were There" / "I'll Never Love This Way Again" / "Fallin" / "The Long and Winding Road"
7. "Sana Maulit Muli" (Carol Banawa, Bituin Escalante, and Roselle Nava)
8. "Best of My Love" (with Carol Banawa, Bituin Escalante, and Roselle Nava)
9. "Pagdating ng Panahon"
10. "Gaano Ko Ikaw Kamahal" / "Saan Ka Man Naroroon" / "Ang Pipit" / "Kahit Konting Pagtingin" / "Sa Ugoy ng Duyan"
11. "On the Wings of Love"
12. "At Seventeen" / "Sandra" / "I've Never Been to Me"
13. "Kailangan Ko'y Ikaw" / "Pangako" / "Hanggang Ngayon" (with Ogie Alcasid)
14. "Bakit Ngayon Ka Lang" / "Ikaw Sana" (Ogie Alcasid)
15. "Thank You for the Music" / "Take a Chance on Me" / "Money, Money, Money" / "Mamma Mia"
16. "Sometime, Somewhere"
17. "You and I" / "Fill the World With Love"
18. "A Piece of Sky"

Encore

19. "What Kind of Fool Am I?"

== Personnel ==
Credits and personnel are taken from the television special One Night with Regine.

Show

- Charo Santos-Concio – overall in charge of production
- Johnny Manahan – television director
- Ryan Cayabyab – musical director
- Chit Guerrero – supervising producer
- Michael Francis Muñoz – production manager
- Patty Mayoralgo – production manager
- Esterbelle Francisco – executive producer
- Jinky Fabileco – associate producer
- Chris Violago – head writer
- Senedy Que – associate writer
- Alco Guerrero – segment director
- Topel Lee – segment director
- Boy Maybituin – lighting director
- Edmund Ty – visual consultant
- Gil Bien – set designer
- Wilmer Bayubay – stage manager
- Alex Magbanua – floor director
- Arnel Natividad – floor director
- Malou Sevilla – floor director

Band

- The San Miguel Philharmonic Orchestra
- The San Miguel Master Chorale
- Gerard Salonga – orchestral arrangements
- Raul Mitra – orchestral arrangements
- Louie Ocampo – orchestral arrangements
- Ed Nepomuceno – orchestral arrangements
- JC Merlino – orchestral arrangements
- Cesar Aguas – acoustic guitars
- Sonny Azurin – bass guitars
- Teddy Tipon – guitars

== See also ==
- List of Regine Velasquez live performances
