= Songbird Sings Streisand =

2003 concert residency by Regine Velasquez

- Residency by Regine Velasquez
- Promotional poster for the show
- Location: Makati, Metro Manila, Philippines
- Venue: Onstage Theater
- Start date: November 14, 2003
- End date: December 20, 2003
- Legs: 1
- No. of shows: 12

Regine Velasquez concert chronology
- Martin & Regine: The World Concert Tour (2003); Songbird Sings Streisand (2003); Reigning Still (2004)

Songbird Sings Streisand was a concert residency and tribute show by Filipino singer Regine Velasquez at the Onstage Theater in Makati. The residency began on November 14 and concluded on December 20, 2003, after completing twelve shows. The set list contained songs recorded by American singer-songwriter Barbra Streisand, who Velasquez described as an inspiration and influence. It featured Streisand's extensive catalogue in music, film, and theatre. The show was exclusively promoted by Maximedia International. Raul Mitra served as musical director for the production. Reviews for the show were generally positive, with critics praising Velasquez's vocal ability.

== Background and development ==
Regine Velasquez's music was influenced by foreign artists early in her career. She has been vocal of her admiration for American singer-songwriter Barbra Streisand, who she cites as her "musical inspiration" and "most revered idol". She has stated, "I’ve been singing [Streisand's] songs since I was 12 years old ... but they are not easy to sing. They’re very difficult. The melodies are very complicated." Velasquez further said that she admires Streisand's "fearlessness" and "dedication to excellence". In the early 1990s, Velasquez first performed a Streisand tribute show at the Mandarin Oriental Manila's Captain's Bar which was staged for four nights.

On October 25, 2003, the Philippine Daily Inquirer announced that Velasquez would return to perform a Streisand tribute show at the Onstage Theater in Makati for six nights on all weekends of November. All the songs on the show were selected from Streisand's extensive catalogue in music, film and theatre. Velasquez described the process as a "daunting task" and added that she hoped to include a variety of genres from "classics" to "standards". Velasquez re-teamed with Raul Mitra as musical director after their collaborations in 2001's Regine at the Movies and 2002's Songbird Sings. A week after the last performance, Maximedia added six more dates in December, bringing the number to twelve shows.

== Synopsis and reception ==
The concert began with Velasquez performing "As If We Never Said Goodbye". At the conclusion of the song, the curtains opened to reveal rows of musicians across the stage while she transitioned directly to Anyone Can Whistle's theme "Everybody Says Don't". She then sat centerstage and sang a medley of "Comin' In and Out of Your Life", "Kiss Me in the Rain", and "My Heart Belongs to Me". For the next number, she did renditions of Streisand's collaborations with the Bee Gees: "Guilty" and "Woman in Love". The set list continued with songs from the soundtrack of Streisand's 1976 musical romance drama A Star Is Born. "Memory" and "Send In the Clowns" were performed afterwards, before she closed the segment with a medley of "With One Look" and "Somewhere".

The next segment started with the show tune "Don't Rain on My Parade" from the musical Funny Girl. Velasquez then sang "The Way We Were", before continuing with a medley of Streisand's duets, such as "You Don't Bring Me Flowers", "Till I Loved You", and "I Finally Found Someone". Shortly after, she stood next to the piano for a performance of "The Music of the Night" with Raul Mitra. This was followed by a Latin-oriented rendition of "No More Tears (Enough Is Enough)". Next, she sang the show title tune "Songbird". After singing excerpts from "Papa, Can You Hear Me?", Velasquez proceeded to perform the songs from the 1983 musical film Yentl. She closed the show with an encore performance of "People" and "On a Clear Day (You Can See Forever)".

The concerts were met with positive responses from critics, who praised the show's theme and Velasquez's vocal abilities. Boy Abunda from The Philippine Star called it a "musical extravaganza" and an "audio-visual feast". He continued to commend the show's music, saying, "[Velasquez] not only chose the popular signature hits ... but she also included the more obscure selections". Abunda also described Velasquez as a "seasoned chanteuse" who "has mastered the fine art of belting". Meanwhile, the Philippine Daily Inquirer's Nestor Torre Jr. wrote: "[Velasquez] empathizes both emotionally and vocally with Streisand's repertoire, and this musical chemistry makes for her especially personal renditions of [Streisand's] signature songs."

== Set list ==
This set list is adapted from the television special Songbird Sings Streisand. (Note: Songbird Sings Streisand was aired as a television special on RPN in 2004.)

1. "As If We Never Said Goodbye"
2. "Everybody Says Don't"
3. "Comin' In and Out of Your Life" / "Kiss Me in the Rain" / "My Heart Belongs to Me"
4. "Guilty"
5. "Woman in Love"
6. "Lost Inside of You" / "With One More Look at You" / "Evergreen"
7. "Memory"
8. "Send In the Clowns"
9. "With One Look" / "Somewhere"
10. "Don't Rain on My Parade"
11. "The Way We Were"
12. "You Don't Bring Me Flowers" / "Till I Loved You" / "I Finally Found Someone" / "All of My Life"
13. "The Music of the Night"
14. "No More Tears (Enough Is Enough)"
15. "Songbird"
16. "Papa, Can You Hear Me?"
17. "The Way He Makes Me Feel" / "No Matter What Happens"
18. "A Piece of Sky"

Encore

19. "People"
20. "On a Clear Day (You Can See Forever)"

== Shows ==
List of concerts, showing date, city, and venue
Date	City	Venue
November 14, 2003	Makati	Onstage Theater
November 15, 2003	Makati	Onstage Theater
November 21, 2003	Makati	Onstage Theater
November 22, 2003	Makati	Onstage Theater
November 28, 2003	Makati	Onstage Theater
November 29, 2003	Makati	Onstage Theater
December 5, 2003	Makati	Onstage Theater
December 6, 2003	Makati	Onstage Theater
December 12, 2003	Makati	Onstage Theater
December 13, 2003	Makati	Onstage Theater
December 19, 2003	Makati	Onstage Theater
December 20, 2003	Makati	Onstage Theater

== See also ==
- List of Regine Velasquez live performances
