= Reflections (residency) =

2005 concert residency by Regine Velasquez

- Residency by Regine Velasquez
- Promotional poster for the show
- Location: Pasay, Metro Manila, Philippines
- Venue: Aliw Theater
- Start date: November 4, 2005
- End date: December 10, 2005
- Legs: 1
- No. of shows: 8

Regine Velasquez concert chronology
- Reigning Still (2004); Reflections (2005); Twenty (2006)

Reflections was a concert residency by Filipino singer Regine Velasquez at the Aliw Theater in Pasay. It began on November 4, 2005, and concluded on December 10, 2005, after eight shows. The set list featured songs curated by Velasquez from the discographies of her musical influences, such as Mariah Carey, Sharon Cuneta, Sheena Easton, Whitney Houston, and Kuh Ledesma. Velasquez aspired to perform songs that are reflective of her personal and professional life. She aimed to create a live experience in a more intimate environment, believing that it was a way for her to connect with her audience. The concert was jointly promoted by GMA Network and Aria Productions, with Velasquez as the stage director and Raul Mitra as the musical director. Jona Viray, Ai-Ai delas Alas, and Kim Flores were selected as guest acts.

== Background and development ==
Regine Velasquez's music featured elements rooted in American pop early in her career. Her musical style was influenced by artists such as Mariah Carey, Sheena Easton, and Whitney Houston. She admired Houston's R&B sound and praised Carey's songwriting, and cites various OPM artists, including Sharon Cuneta and Kuh Ledesma, as her role models. On September 21, 2005, The Philippine Star announced that Velasquez would perform eight shows to take place between November and December at the Aliw Theater in Pasay titled Reflections. The publication previewed that the residency's central focus would be performances that "reflect her life and career".

When explaining the concept and title of the show, Velasquez asserted: "It will be like a retrospective concert ...it will be an evening for looking back on how I started". She added that working on small-venue concerts allowed her to explore new ideas, and further said that she finds enjoyment with the "intimacy afforded by a [concert] series" to connect with her audience. The set list featured songs that were curated by Velasquez from the catalogue of her musical influences, which she described as songs "about my dreams, my aspirations and even my heartaches". It was jointly produced by GMA Network and Aria Productions. Velasquez served as the stage director, while Raul Mitra was chosen as musical director. Jona Viray, Ai-Ai delas Alas, and Kim Flores performed as guest acts.

== Synopsis and recordings ==
The concert opened with an overture of Irene Cara's "Fame". Two female performers portraying younger versions of Velasquez each took turns singing verses from the song. Velasquez then appeared onstage and joined the singers as the performance continued. She then transitioned directly into Gloria Estefan's "Rhythm Is Gonna Get You" accompanied by dancers. She followed this with the ballad "Break It to Me Gently" by Angela Bofill, before performing a medley of Sheena Easton's "For Your Eyes Only", "I Wouldn't Beg for Water", and"Almost Over You". After this, she sat centerstage and spoke of her admiration for Sharon Cuneta and proceeded with a performance of the latter's movie themes. Velasquez was then joined by Jona Viray for a duet number.

The next segment began with a medley of songs popularized by English girl group Spice Girls, including "2 Become 1", "Holler", "Say You'll Be There", "Wannabe", and "Who Do You Think You Are". The set list continued with a tribute number to Kuh Ledesma. She then performed a cover of Anita Baker's "Just Because". Velasquez then performed a medley of Mariah Carey's "Butterfly", "Never Too Far", and "My All", followed by the signature songs from the soundtrack of Whitney Houston's 1992 romantic film The Bodyguard. The show ended with an encore performance of Christina Aguilera's Reflection.

Reflections aired as a television special on GMA Network in 2006. For the production, Velasquez was awarded Female Entertainer of the Year at the 36th Box Office Entertainment Awards.

== Set list ==
This set list is adapted from the television special Reflections. (Note: Reflections was aired as a television special on GMA Network in 2006.)

1. "Fame"
2. "Rhythm Is Gonna Get You"
3. "Break It to Me Gently"
4. "For Your Eyes Only" / "I Wouldn't Beg for Water" / "Almost Over You"
5. "Mr. DJ" / "Dear Heart" / "P.S., I Love You"
6. "Kailangan Ko'y Ikaw" / "You Are My Song" / "You've Made Me Stronger" / "Dadalhin"
7. "2 Become 1" / "Holler" / "Say You'll Be There" / "Wannabe" / "Who Do You Think You Are"
8. "Dito Ba?" / "Sana Bukas Pa Ang Kahapon" / "Wakas" / "Sana"
9. "Just Because"
10. "Butterfly" / "Never Too Far" / "My All"
11. "I Will Always Love You" / "Run To You" / "I Have Nothing"

Encore

12. "Reflection"

== Shows ==
List of concerts, showing date, city, venue, and guest act
Date	City	Venue	Guest act
November 4, 2005	Pasay	Aliw Theater	Jona Viray; Ai-Ai delas Alas; Kim Flores
November 5, 2005	Pasay	Aliw Theater	Jona Viray; Ai-Ai delas Alas; Kim Flores
November 11, 2005	Pasay	Aliw Theater	Jona Viray; Ai-Ai delas Alas; Kim Flores
November 12, 2005	Pasay	Aliw Theater	Jona Viray; Ai-Ai delas Alas; Kim Flores
November 18, 2005	Pasay	Aliw Theater	Jona Viray; Ai-Ai delas Alas; Kim Flores
November 19, 2005	Pasay	Aliw Theater	Jona Viray; Ai-Ai delas Alas; Kim Flores
December 9, 2005	Pasay	Aliw Theater	Jona Viray; Ai-Ai delas Alas; Kim Flores
December 10, 2005	Pasay	Aliw Theater	Jona Viray; Ai-Ai delas Alas; Kim Flores

== See also ==
- List of Regine Velasquez live performances
