= Two knights =

Two knights may refer to:

- Two Knights Defense – chess opening
- Two knights endgame – chess endgame
- Two Knights from Brooklyn – 1949 film
- Two Arabian Knights – 1927 film
- Two Nights with Cleopatra – 1953 film
- Two for the Knight – 2002 concert by Brian McKnight and Regine Velasquez
- Two Knights (band) – an American Midwest emo band from Denton, Texas
