= Songbird Sings the Classics =

2000 concert by Regine Velasquez

- Concert by Regine Velasquez
- Promotional poster for the show
- Location: Pasay, Metro Manila, Philippines
- Venue: Westin Philippine Plaza
- Date: October 6, 2000
- No. of shows: 1

Regine Velasquez concert chronology
- R2K: The Concert (2000); Songbird Sings the Classics (2000); R-15 (2001)

Songbird Sings the Classics was a concert by Filipino singer Regine Velasquez, held on October 6, 2000, at the Grand Ballroom of the Westin Philippine Plaza in Pasay. It was produced by Maximedia International, with Pond's as the sponsor. The set list featured songs curated from 1960s and 1970s music, including those of Leonard Bernstein, Michel Legrand, Henry Mancini, and Barry Manilow. Gerard Salonga served as conductor and music director, backed by the 15-member ensemble of the Manila Philharmonic Orchestra. It was positively received by music critics, who praised the intimate show, and Velasquez's and Salonga's partnership.

== Background and development ==
On September 22, 2000, the Philippine Daily Inquirer published that Regine Velasquez would be performing a one-night concert at the Westin Philippine Plaza's Grand Ballroom in Pasay. The show was noted as Velasquez's commemoration of her fourteen-year career and was exclusively promoted by Maximedia International, with Pond's as its major sponsor. The set list featured songs curated from music of the 1960s and 1970s, including those of Leonard Bernstein, Michel Legrand, Henry Mancini, and Barry Manilow. It marked Velasquez's first collaboration with conductor and music director Gerard Salonga, whose previous works were primarily with his sister Lea. He has stated that he was thrilled with the idea of collaborating with other live performers: "I've always wanted to work with Regine, and I'm glad that we've been given a chance to do this concert together." Velasquez and Salonga were accompanied by the 15-member ensemble of the Manila Philharmonic Orchestra.

== Synopsis and reception ==
The concert opened with the Manila Philharmonic Orchestra playing an overture rendition of Barbra Streisand's "Songbird" and continued with Velasquez singing the first few verses of the song as she emerged from the audience section, making her way to centerstage. She followed this with a performance of "You Will Be My Music", before transitioning into a Mancini tribute number, which included the songs "Moon River", "Two For The Road", and "Moment To Moment". Next, Velasquez sang "Autumn Leaves" and "Tuwing Umuulan". The setlist continued with a medley of Basil Valdez's hits and Ryan Cayabyab's "Sometime Somewhere". The next number saw Velasquez perform a sultry rendition of Neil Sedaka's "Breaking Up Is Hard to Do". This was followed by "If You Go Away", "What Are You Doing the Rest of Your Life?", and "Run to You". Shortly after, Velasquez stood next to the piano for a duet performance of "With You I'm Born Again" with Salonga. At this point, Velasquez began a Barry Manilow tribute number, before closing the show with "Somewhere", and an encore performance of "What Kind of Fool Am I?"

The Philippine Daily Inquirer's Ruben Cruz was impressed by the show, describing Velasquez's and Salonga's collaboration a "brilliant team-up". He continued to compliment Velasquez's performance, writing, "After 14 years in the music business, it seems Regine has pretty much figured herself out. She knows where she's been and who she is and, even possibly, where to go, and the self-assurance shows onstage, in her performance, in the way she carries a conversation, even the way she looks." Cruz highlighted how she can "sing every song and set the listeners into a particular mood", calling her a "true songbird indeed". A journalist from The Philippine Star wrote that the concert was "another coup in the live music scene".

== Broadcast and recordings ==
Radio Philippines Network filmed the concert as a television special, titled Songbird Sings The Classics: A 14th Year Anniversary Presentation, which aired on October 13, 2000. After the broadcast, a live album was released by Viva Records in December. It contained 14 songs and the bonus track "Somewhere". In AllMusic's review, David Gonzales complimented Velasquez's vocals but criticized the album's audio mixing. It sold more than 240,000 copies (Note: Philippine sales figure equivalent of 6× platinum certification for Regine Live: Songbird Sings the Classics.) and received a sextuple platinum certification from the Philippine Association of the Record Industry.

== Set list ==
This set list is adapted from the television special Songbird Sings the Classics. (Note: Songbird Sings the Classics was aired as a television special on October 13, 2000 on RPN.)

1. "Songbird"
2. "You Will Be My Music"
3. "Moon River" / "Two For The Road" / "Moment to Moment"
4. "Autumn Leaves"
5. "Tuwing Umuulan"
6. "Ngayon At Kailanman" / "Iduyan Mo, Kailan" / "Hangggang Sa Dulo Ng Walang Hanggan" / "Kastilyong Buhangin"
7. "Sometime Somewhere"
8. "Breaking Up Is Hard to Do"
9. "If You Go Away"
10. "What Are You Doing the Rest of Your Life?"
11. "Run to You"
12. "With You I'm Born Again"
13. "Could It Be Magic" / "Weekend In New England" / "Even Now" / "If I Should Love Again"
14. "Kailangan Ko'y Ikaw"
15. "Somewhere"

Encore

16. "What Kind of Fool Am I?"

== See also ==
- List of Regine Velasquez live performances
