= Songbird Sings Legrand =

2003 concert by Michel Legrand and Regine Velasquez

- Concert by Michel Legrand and Regine Velasquez
- Promotional poster for the show
- Location: Pasay, Metro Manila, Philippines
- Venue: Philippine International Convention Center (PICC) Plenary Hall
- Start date: February 14, 2003
- End date: February 16, 2003
- No. of shows: 3
Regine Velasquez concert chronology
Songbird Sings (2002)	Songbird Sings Legrand (2003)	Martin & Regine: The World Concert Tour (2003)

Songbird Sings Legrand was a co-headlining concert by French composer Michel Legrand and Filipino singer Regine Velasquez. The concert was announced in December 2002 and held on three consecutive nights in February 2003 at the Philippine International Convention Center (PICC) Plenary Hall in Pasay. Velasquez performed songs selected from Legrand's discography, backed by the San Miguel Philharmonic Orchestra. The show was divided into two segments; the first which featured overtures conducted by Legrand, being followed by an intermission, before Velasquez joined the composer in the second segment.

Songbird Sings Legrand was a joint production by Maximedia International and CityLights Entertainment U.K., with GMA Network as the official broadcast partner. Initially announced for a two-night run, all the tickets made available for purchase sold out, which prompted a third show to be added. The concert was met with mixed reviews from music critics. Some praised the ambitious magnitude of the production, as well as Velasquez's more restrained performance, while others criticized the exclusion of Legrand's widely popular works from the set list.

== Background and development ==
In February 2002, Michel Legrand staged his first Valentine's Day show in Manila at the Philippine International Convention Center (PICC) Plenary Hall in Pasay with singer Kuh Ledesma. During that period, it was reported that Legrand later met with Regine Velasquez and promoter Maximedia International to discuss plans of a collaboration between the pair. Velasquez auditioned for the composer and chose to perform his songs "What Are You Doing the Rest of Your Life?" and "No Matter What Happens". Impressed by her performance, Legrand commented: "After she sang the first note, 'I told myself, that's for me! Let's get married—musically of course!'" Shortly after, it was revealed that Velasquez would record an album with Legrand in a deal worth a reported ₱15 million (US$725,500), and the pair would perform a series of shows in the Philippines. That May, Velasquez travelled to Paris and met with Legrand at his residence in preparation for the project. She considered it an "honor" to work with Legrand, saying, "The mere fact that he's worked with Barbra Streisand and all those other big artists already excites me."

On December 8, 2002, the Philippine Daily Inquirer confirmed the duo's collaboration, titled Songbird Sings Legrand, with dates announced as February 14–15, 2003 at the PICC Plenary Hall. Following the announcement of the two-night concert, all the tickets made available for the shows sold out, which prompted a third date to be added on February 16. The show was a joint production by Maximedia and CityLights Entertainment U.K., with hygiene brand Dove as its major sponsor. During the concert, Legrand and Velasquez were accompanied by the 60-member ensemble of the San Miguel Philharmonic Orchestra. It was aired as a two-part television special on May 11 and 18, 2003 on GMA Network.

== Synopsis and reception ==
The concert was divided into two segments; the first act featured Legrand and the San Miguel Philharmonic Orchestra playing overtures of the composer's works. These included renditions of "I Will Wait for You" from the 1964 musical drama The Umbrellas of Cherbourg, "How Do You Keep the Music Playing?" from the 1982 romantic comedy Best Friends, and "Summer Me, Winter Me" from the 1969 drama The Picasso Summer. After an intermission, Velasquez appeared onstage wearing a white ballgown and sang "Quand on s'aime" as a duet with Legrand. She then continued with "Between Yesterday and Tomorrow", before transitioning directly into several numbers, including Barbra Streisand's "On My Way to You". Next, Velasquez sang "Kailangan Ko'y Ikaw" accompanied by Legrand playing the piano, before she went offstage. After Legrand played two short pieces, Velasquez returned onstage and immediately started with "The Summer Knows" from the 1971 film Summer of '42. She then sat centerstage and performed "Something New in My Life" and "Happy". The setlist continued with duets of "What Are You Doing the Rest of Your Life?" and "The Windmills of Your Mind". For the final act, Velasquez and Legrand performed songs from the 1983 musical film Yentl. The pair closed the show with an encore performance of "A Piece of Sky".

The concert garnered mixed reviews from music critics. There was praise for the ambitious magnitude of its production, while it was criticized for its exclusion of Legrand's widely popular works from the repertoire. Vladimir Bunoan of the Philippine Daily Inquirer commended Velasquez's "subtle dramatic styling" and "moving" performances, but was critical of her limited musical numbers. He added, "Allowing Velasquez more stage time would not necessarily take out the focus from the composer. In fact, the songs, I believe, would be better served." He concluded, "[It] is still a well-produced, well-performed show. Clearly a cut above our usual concerts here. But there were just too many opportunities that have been missed." Writer Ronald Mangubat, also from the Philippine Daily Inquirer, was appreciative of Velasquez's "restrained singing" but felt that the show had little "verbal interaction", further writing that she "could have expressed herself more during the show ... there was an air of coldness in what was supposed to be a warm, romantic show". In contrast, The Philippine Star critic Jonathan Chua wrote, "[Velasquez's] singing at the concert was equal to the song. [She] substituted expression for exclamation, tempering what would have been merely strident." Journalist Edmund Sicam called the concert a "quiet interlude", writing, "[T]here were no sexy dancers or fancy lighting to jazz up the musical numbers ... [Velasquez] held back her powerful voice for many of the numbers, something she has never done in her other concerts. Legrand's music and enchanting lyrics were enough to get the audience to applaud heartily."

== Set list ==
This set list is adapted from the television special Songbird Sings Legrand. (Note: Songbird Sings Legrand was aired as a two-part television special on May 11 and 18, 2003 on GMA Network.)

1. "Quand on s'aime"
2. "Between Yesterday and Tomorrow"
3. "Watch What Happens"
4. "On My Way to You"
5. "Once You've Been In Love"
6. "Kailangan Ko'y Ikaw"
7. "The Summer Knows"
8. "Something New in My Life"
9. "Happy"
10. "What Are You Doing the Rest of Your Life?"
11. "Breezy's Song"
12. "The Windmills of Your Mind"
13. "Papa, Can You Hear Me?"
14. "The Way He Makes Me Feel"

Encore

15. "A Piece of Sky"

== Personnel ==
Credits and personnel are adapted from the television special Songbird Sings Legrand.

Show

- Rico Mortel – overall in charge of production
- Wilma V. Galvante – executive in charge of production
- Michel Legrand – musical director
- Janice Dee – production manager
- Beng Oebanda – assistant production manager
- Jojo Cano – stage manager
- Bojie Singson – stage manager
- Gerard Trouve – sound engineer
- Marvin Buenaventura – set designer
- Martin Jickaine – assistant director
- Perry Lansigan – floor director
- Shakira Maris-Villa – lighting director
- Rajo Laurel – costume design
- Jay Feliciano – hair and make-up

Band

- The San Miguel Philharmonic Orchestra
- Egay Gonzales – keyboards
- Cesar Aguas – guitars
- Soc Mina – guitars
- Teddy Tipon – drums

Executive producers

- Maximedia International
- CityLights Entertainment U.K.

== See also ==
- List of Regine Velasquez live performances
