= Martin & Regine: The World Concert Tour =

2003 concert tour by Martin Nievera and Regine Velasquez

- Tour by Martin Nievera and Regine Velasquez
- Promotional poster for the tour
- Start date: March 8, 2003
- End date: July 5, 2003
- Legs: 2
- No. of shows: 11
Martin Nievera concert chronology
Opening Night (2002)	Martin & Regine: The World Concert Tour (2003)	Tough Crowd (2004)
Regine Velasquez concert chronology
Songbird Sings Legrand (2003)	Martin & Regine: The World Concert Tour (2003)	Songbird Sings Streisand (2003)

Martin & Regine: The World Concert Tour was a co-headlining tour by Filipino performers Martin Nievera and Regine Velasquez. It began on March 8, 2003 in Honolulu, Hawaii and visited the United States and the Philippines. The joint tour came after the two had finished their own concert residencies at the Onstage Theatre in 2002 — Nievera's Opening Night and Velasquez's Songbird Sings. The tour was announced early in 2003 and was exclusively promoted by Maximedia International. The set list featured songs taken from both singers' discographies, including collaborations such as "You Are My Song" and "Forever", as well as various covers. Louie Ocampo and Gerard Salonga served as the musical directors for the United States and Philippine legs, respectively. Reviews for the tour were generally positive, with critics praising both artists' vocal abilities.

== Background and development ==
Martin Nievera and Regine Velasquez first collaborated in 1986 on the variety show The Penthouse Live!, where the former was a host. Velasquez had just released her single "Love Me Again" under the name Chona, and it was Nievera who later suggested she adopt the stage name Regine. The pair co-headlined a concert called Voices in October 1991 at the PhilSports Arena. Since then, other notable collaborations between the pair include "Forever", a duet from Nievera's 1994 album Roads and "You Are My Song", the soundtrack to Velasquez's 1996 film Wanted Perfect Mother which was written by Nievera.

Throughout 2002, both performers had their respective concert residencies at the Onstage Theatre in Makati, which were produced by Maximedia International. Nievera's Opening Night which ran from May to November, and Velasquez's Songbird Sings during November and December. In early 2003, Maximedia was announced as the production company for the pair's five-city co-headlining tour in the United States that began in Honolulu in March. A Philippine leg was added which included shows in Cebu, Pampanga, and Manila. Louie Ocampo served as the musical director for the United States concerts, while Gerard Salonga was tapped for the shows in the Philippines. Nievera described the tour as a "collision of two powerful voices" without the added "gimmick": "We're both balladeers and powerful singers ... so you won't see any dancers, fire eaters and things like that. You'll see two people really singing".

== Synopsis ==
The concert opened with the duo performing excerpts from "You Are My Song", followed by a rendition of Shalamar's "A Night to Remember". The setlist continued with covers of "It's You" and "With You I'm Born Again", before Nievera left the stage and Velasquez went on to perform a medley of Vanessa Carlton's "A Thousand Miles" and "Pretty Baby". She then sang "Pangarap Ko Ang Ibigin Ka", the main theme song of her film of the same name. Next, Nievera and Velasquez performed a medley of OPM duets, which was followed by Nievera's performance of "Chasing Time" and "True Love". The pair then performed "Used To Be" and "As".

The next segment opened with a tribute to James Ingram. Velasquez then performed a cover of Nievera's "Ikaw Ang Lahat Sa Akin", followed by "Hinahanap-Hanap Kita" and "Kailangan Kita". Nievera returned onstage for a performance of "My Sacrifice" and "I Don't Want to Miss a Thing". The next number saw the pair perform songs of Josh Groban, before closing with a medley of Broadway musical themes from the West Side Story, Jekyll & Hyde, Sweeney Todd: The Demon Barber of Fleet Street, and They're Playing Our Song. The show ended with an encore performance of "Forever" and "On the Wings of Love".

== Reception ==
The concerts were met with high praise from critics. In a review of the opening night in Manila, the Philippine Daily Inquirer's Vladimir Bunoan wrote: "With their penchant for showy vocals, the two singers are natural as singing partners, and one could even sense that they bring out the best in each other vocally." He praised the duo's "haunting" and "bombastic" renditions, which he described as "show-stoppers". Bunoan, however, felt that despite being a "vocal match-up", the pair lacked a "sizzling onstage chemistry". Journalist Leah Salterio was also positive of the United States shows, writing that the Nievera's and Velasquez's "combined star power drew in some of the biggest Fil-Am audiences in recent memory".

== Set list ==
This set list is adapted from the television special Martin & Regine: The World Concert Tour. (Note: Martin & Regine: The World Concert Tour was aired as a television special on ABS-CBN in 2003.)

1. "You Are My Song"
2. "A Night to Remember"
3. "It's You"
4. "With You I'm Born Again"
5. "A Thousand Miles" / "Pretty Baby"
6. "Pangarap Ko Ang Ibigin Ka"
7. "Umagang Kay Ganda" / "Magkasuyo Buong Gabi" / "Kailangan Ko, Kailangan Mo" / "I Don't Love You Anymore"
8. "Chasing Time" / "True Love"
9. "Used To Be"
10. "If You're Not the One"
11. "As"
12. "There's No Easy Way" / "I Don't Have the Heart" / "How Do You Keep the Music Playing?"
13. "Ikaw Ang Lahat Sa Akin"
14. "Hinahanap-Hanap Kita"
15. "Kailangan Kita"
16. "My Sacrifice" / "I Don't Want to Miss a Thing"
17. "Vincent" / "To Where You Are" / "You're Still You" / "All I Know Of Love" / "The Prayer"
18. "I Have a Love" / "Someone Like You" / "Not While I'm Around" / "If He Really Knew Me" / "Take Me as I Am" / "Somewhere"

Encore

19. "Forever" / "On the Wings of Love"

== Shows ==
List of concerts, showing date, city, country, and venue
Date (2003)	City	Country	Venue
Leg 1 — North America
March 8	Honolulu	United States	Hawaii Convention Center
March 15	San Diego	United States	Cox Arena
March 22	Chicago	United States	Arie Crown Theatre
March 29	San Francisco	United States	Cow Palace
April 5	Los Angeles	United States	Pauley Pavilion
Leg 2 — Asia
May 2	Cebu	Philippines	Waterfront Cebu City Hotel
May 9	Manila	Philippines	Araneta Coliseum
May 10	Manila	Philippines	Araneta Coliseum
June 14	Manila	Philippines	Araneta Coliseum
June 28	Pampanga	Philippines	Freedom Ring Amphitheater
July 5	Manila	Philippines	Araneta Coliseum

== See also ==
- List of Regine Velasquez live performances
