= Songbird Sings =

2002 concert residency by Regine Velasquez

- Residency by Regine Velasquez
- Promotional poster for the show
- Location: Makati, Metro Manila, Philippines
- Venue: Onstage Theater
- Start date: November 8, 2002
- End date: December 28, 2002
- Legs: 1
- No. of shows: 15

Regine Velasquez concert chronology
- One Night with Regine (2002); Songbird Sings (2002); Songbird Sings Legrand (2003)

Songbird Sings was a concert residency by Filipina singer Regine Velasquez at the Onstage Theater in Makati. The residency began on November 8 and concluded on December 28, 2002, after completing fifteen shows. The set list featured songs taken from Velasquez's discography. These incorporated tracks she released from her cover albums. The show was produced by Maximedia International. Raul Mitra served as musical director, while Gabby Eigenmann was selected as guest act. It was positively received by music critics, who praised the show's theme and Velasquez's live performance.

== Background and development ==
On November 2, 2002, the Philippine Daily Inquirer announced that Velasquez would perform fifteen shows on all weekends of November and December at the Onstage Theater in Makati. The series of shows was her second concert residency at the venue after Regine at the Movies in November 2001. She reunited with Raul Mitra, who served as musical director. Gabby Eigenmann also returned as guest act after collaborating with Velasquez in her concert series the previous year. The show was exclusively promoted by Maximedia International. The set list featured songs taken from Velasquez's discography, which included covers she recorded. It was described as a show that "focuse[d] on [Velasquez's] long and fruitful journey told through her own music". According to Velasquez, playing the show was deeply personal. She explained, "This concert is going to be all about me [and] how I started". She continued saying that it was vital for her to perform songs that significantly played a part in her career.

== Synopsis and reception ==
The show began with an overture of "Narito Ako", before transitioning into a folk rendition of the song. Velasquez continued the opening set with "Urong Sulong" joined by two female dancers. She then sat centerstage and sang the ballads "Linlangin Mo" and "You've Made Me Stronger". This was followed by an acoustic performance of "Sana Maulit Muli". For the next number, Velasquez sang "Perry's Will" and continued with an a cappella version of "Tuwing Umuulan" accompanied by her background vocalists singing the melodies. She ended the segment with a medley of her cover songs, such as Southern Sons' "You Were There", Michael Johnson's "Bluer Than Blue", and Ronnie Dyson's "Just Don't Want to Be Lonely".

The next segment saw Velasquez appear in the middle of the audience section as she walked down the stairs towards centerstage while performing Jeffrey Osborne's "On the Wings of Love". The setlist continued with her soundtrack themes, including "You Are My Song", "Ikaw", "Pangako", and "Kailangan Ko'y Ikaw". "Dadalhin" and "Sa Aking Pag-iisa" were performed afterwards. "Love Me Again" was introduced with a brief speech about her career beginnings. During "Follow The Sun", Velasquez went down to the audience section and interacted with the crowd. She then returned onstage and sang the show tune "What Kind of Fool Am I?", before ending the show with an encore performance of Aerosmith's "I Don't Want to Miss a Thing".

The concerts were met with positive responses from critics, who praised the show's theme and Velasquez's performance. The Philippine Daily Inquirer's Ronald Mangubat wrote: "[Velasquez's] concert did not disappoint. She was in her element as she sang the songs that made her who she is now ... she sang with ease, despite the high notes." He was also appreciative of Velasquez's "spontaneous simplicity" during her interactions with the audience. Nicole Valdez of The Philippine Star praised the show's concept, writing, "In the [Philippine] concert scene, it is no mean feat for any artist to do a concert of only his or her songs ... but then again, [Velasquez] has been known to take risks ... her concert series attests to this." Valdez further commended Velasquez's vocal ability and versatility, which she termed as "melancholic", "vivacious", and "endearing".

== Set list ==
This set list is taken from the television special Songbird Sings. (Note: Songbird Sings was aired as a television special on RPN in 2003.)

1. "Narito Ako"
2. "Urong Sulong"
3. "Linlangin Mo"
4. "You've Made Me Stronger"
5. "Sana Maulit Muli"
6. "Perry's Will"
7. "Tuwing Umuulan"
8. "You Were There" / "Bluer Than Blue" / "Just Don't Want to Be Lonely"
9. "On the Wings of Love"
10. "You Are My Song"
11. "Ikaw" / "Pangako" / "Kailangan Ko'y Ikaw"
12. "Adore"
13. "Dadalhin"
14. "Sa Aking Pag-iisa"
15. "Love Me Again"
16. "Follow The Sun"
17. "What Kind of Fool Am I?"

Encore

18. "I Don't Want to Miss a Thing"

== Shows ==
List of concerts, showing date, city, venue, and guest act
Date	City	Venue	Guest act
November 8, 2002	Makati	Onstage Theater	Gabby Eigenmann
November 9, 2002	Makati	Onstage Theater	Gabby Eigenmann
November 21, 2002	Makati	Onstage Theater	Gabby Eigenmann
November 22, 2002	Makati	Onstage Theater	Gabby Eigenmann
November 23, 2002	Makati	Onstage Theater	Gabby Eigenmann
November 29, 2002	Makati	Onstage Theater	Gabby Eigenmann
November 30, 2002	Makati	Onstage Theater	Gabby Eigenmann
December 6, 2002	Makati	Onstage Theater	Gabby Eigenmann
December 7, 2002	Makati	Onstage Theater	Gabby Eigenmann
December 13, 2002	Makati	Onstage Theater	Gabby Eigenmann
December 14, 2002	Makati	Onstage Theater	Gabby Eigenmann
December 20, 2002	Makati	Onstage Theater	Gabby Eigenmann
December 21, 2002	Makati	Onstage Theater	Gabby Eigenmann
December 27, 2002	Makati	Onstage Theater	Gabby Eigenmann
December 28, 2002	Makati	Onstage Theater	Gabby Eigenmann

== See also ==
- List of Regine Velasquez live performances
