= Reigning Still =

2004 concert by Regine Velasquez

- Promotional concert by Regine Velasquez
- Promotional poster for the show
- Location: Araneta Center, Quezon City, Philippines
- Venue: Araneta Coliseum
- Associated album: Covers Volume 1
- Start date: December 3, 2004
- End date: December 4, 2004
- No. of shows: 2

Regine Velasquez concert chronology
- Songbird Sings Streisand (2003); Reigning Still (2004); Reflections (2005)

Reigning Still was an arena concert by Filipino entertainer Regine Velasquez, held on December 3 and 4, 2004, at the Araneta Coliseum in Quezon City. It was part of Velasquez's campaign to support her twelfth studio album, Covers Volume 1 (2004). The set list featured songs predominantly taken from the album, and various covers of pop hits. It was exclusively promoted by GMA Network, with Smart Communications as sponsor. Velasquez served as the stage director for the show, which featured Andrew E., Sarah Geronimo, Sheryn Regis, Kyla, Francis Magalona, and Ariel Rivera as guest acts. Velasquez was nominated for Best Female Major Concert Act at the 18th Aliw Awards for the production.

== Background and development ==
Regine Velasquez released her twelfth studio album Covers Volume 1 on October 10, 2004. The cover album contains remakes of Original Pilipino Music (OPM) recorded by male artists, and was issued with a bonus Video CD (VCD) of four music videos for its tracks, including Ariel Rivera's "Minsan Lang Kitang Iibigin" and Martin Nievera's "Say That You Love Me". The album was a commercial success, selling over 30,000 copies a week after its release and earning a platinum certification from the Philippine Association of the Record Industry (PARI). As part of the album's promotion, Velasquez performed in small venue tours, which included the SM North EDSA and The Podium. In the same month, it was announced that Velasquez would perform a headlining concert on December 3–4, 2004, at the Araneta Coliseum with a show titled Reigning Still.

Velasquez was involved in every aspect of the two-night show, which she envisioned to be her "most spectacular ever". Similar to her previous arena concert in 2000, R2K: The Concert, Velasquez served as stage director, while Raul Mitra was chosen as musical director. During rehearsals and preparations for the show, she said that she was uncertain about staging an arena concert for its physical demands and cost, adding that this might be her last headlining production. She also expressed hesitation saying, "[if] people would still want to see me in a concert like [this] four years from now". The show was a joint production by GMA Network and Aria Productions, with Smart Communications as sponsor. Velasquez and her team selected Andrew E., Sarah Geronimo, Sheryn Regis, Kyla, Francis Magalona, and Ariel Rivera as special guests.

== Synopsis and recordings ==
The concert opened with a masquerade ball as Velasquez, wearing a Victorian era costume, appeared onstage with her background dancers while performing an uptempo version of Barry Manilow's "Could It Be Magic". She was joined by a caped magician performing tricks and illusions, before leaving offstage. The magician exited doing a vanishing act, and made Velasquez re-appear onstage as she began singing Britney Spears's "Toxic" while dancing. After a costume change, she performed "Di Bale Na Lang" with Andrew E. She closed the segment with Ariel Rivera's "Minsan Lang Kitang Iibigin".

The setlist continued with Velasquez's renditions of her singing competition songs, George Benson's "In Your Eyes" and Jennifer Holliday's "And I Am Telling You I'm Not Going". For the latter performance, she was joined by Sarah Geronimo, Sheryn Regis, and Kyla. This was followed by "Say That You Love Me". She then sang a duet of "Tell Me" with Rivera, before continuing with "Kailan". The next segment was a medley of "The Reason", "Bring Me to Life", and "In the End" with Francis Magalona. During the performance of "My Miracle", "I Believe I Can Fly", and "I Believe", Velasquez was accompanied by The San Miguel Chorale. For the final act, Velasquez performed a medley of Michael Jackson's hits. After the song ended, she thanked the audience before exiting the stage. Velasquez returned onstage for an encore performance of "Shine".

The concert aired as a television special on GMA Network in 2005. Velasquez received a nomination for Best Female Major Concert Act at the 18th Aliw Awards for the production.

== Set list ==
This set list is adapted from the television special Reigning Still. (Note: Reigning Still was aired as a television special on GMA Network in 2005.)

1. "Could It Be Magic"
2. "Toxic"
3. "Di Bale Na Lang" (with Andrew E.)
4. "Minsan Lang Kitang Iibigin"
5. "In Your Eyes"
6. "And I Am Telling You I'm Not Going" (with Sarah Geronimo, Sheryn Regis, and Kyla")
7. "Say That You Love Me"
8. "Tell Me" (with Ariel Rivera)
9. "Kailan"
10. "The Reason" / "Bring Me to Life" / "In the End" (with Francis Magalona)
11. "Kailangan Ko'y Ikaw"
12. "My Miracle" / "I Believe I Can Fly" / "I Believe"
13. "Billie Jean" / "Bad" / "Beat It" / "Thriller"

Encore

14. "Shine"

== Personnel ==
Credits and personnel are adapted from the television special Reigning Still.

Show

- Regine Velasquez – show direction, staging
- Raul Mitra – musical director
- Noel Cabacungan – television director
- Maro Garcia – assistant director
- Buboy Favor – floor director
- Rajo Laurel – costume design
- Pepsi Herrera – costume design
- Liza Camus – production manager
- Maribel Garcia – assistant production manager
- John Batalla – lighting
- Rene Cruz – sound engineer

Band

- The San Miguel Master Chorale
- Raul Mitra – keyboards
- Sony Matias – keyboards
- Bobby Rasco – guitars
- Cesar Aguas – guitars
- Tek Faustino – drums
- Niño Regalado – percussion
- Babsie Molina – background vocalist
- Sylvia Macaraeg – background vocalist
- Rene Martinez – background vocalist
- Roy del Valle – background vocalist
- Lisa del Valle – background vocalist

Dancers

- Nancy Crowe
- Des Guico
- Joyce Regala
- Joie Tinsay
- Kristine Averia
- Shiela Lacro
- Ida Ramos
- Charles Thompson
- Angel Sy
- Richard Argulla
- James Valdez
- Julius Obregon
- Nick Tala

Executive producers

- GMA Network
- Aria Productions

== See also ==
- List of Regine Velasquez live performances
