= Two for the Knight =

2002 concert by Brian McKnight and Regine Velasquez

- Concert by Brian McKnight and Regine Velasquez
- Promotional poster for the show
- Location: Araneta Center, Quezon City, Philippines
- Venue: Araneta Coliseum
- Start date: February 14, 2002
- End date: February 15, 2002
- No. of shows: 2
Brian McKnight concert chronology
An Evening with Brian McKnight (2002)	Two for the Knight (2002)	Brian McKnight at RodeoHouston (2002)
Regine Velasquez concert chronology
Regine at the Movies (2001)	Two for the Knight (2002)	One Night with Regine (2002)

Two for the Knight was a co-headlining concert by American singer-songwriter Brian McKnight and Filipino entertainer Regine Velasquez. The concert was announced in January 2002 and held on two consecutive nights in February at the Araneta Coliseum in Quezon City. It was promoted by Viva Concerts and MTV, with Mossimo as its sponsor. McKnight's set list included songs from his studio albums Brian McKnight (1992) and Back at One (1999), while Velasquez's set list included songs from her album Reigne (2001) and some covers. McKnight and Velasquez both performed solo sets, which were bridged by two duets. The show received positive reviews from critics, who praised the singers' performances.

== Background and development ==
In January 2000, American singer-songwriter Brian McKnight was reported to be in talks to collaborate with Regine Velasquez for her arena show, titled R2K: The Concert, that April. It was initially revealed that McKnight would be one of the guest acts for the concert, but instead appeared as a special guest for American musician Kenny Loggins's concert in Manila around the same time. On January 16, 2002, the Manila Standard announced that McKnight would return to Manila for a co-headlining concert with Velasquez at the Araneta Coliseum on February 14–15. Described as the "biggest team-up of a foreign and local artists", the show was jointly promoted by Viva Concerts and MTV, with Mossimo as its sponsor. Viva Concerts previewed that the pair will be performing individual segments as well as duets during the concert. McKnight has stated that he was thrilled to work with Velasquez, saying, "It'll be great to perform with Regine ... She has a fantastic voice. With our voices together, we should do well vocally."

== Synopsis and reception ==
Velasquez opened the show with a performance of "To Reach You" from her album Reigne (2001), before transitioning into "(I've Had) The Time of My Life". She then sat centerstage and sang the ballad "Never Too Far", which was followed by a medley of her film soundtracks: "Ikaw", "Pangako", and "Kailangan Ko'y Ikaw". Next, Velasquez performed a series of disco songs from the 1970s, which were followed by an acoustic version of "Hanggang Ngayon". She ended her segment with a rendition of Michael Bolton's "Go the Distance". For the next number, McKnight joined Velasquez onstage and the pair performed the duets "Love Is" and "Whenever You Call". McKnight's solo part then began with the Justin Timberlake collaboration "My Kind of Girl", as excerpts from Timberlake's part were shown onscreen. The setlist continued with the songs "6, 8, 12" and "Back at One". The show ended with his performance of "One Last Cry".

Writing for The Philippine Star, Kap Maceda praised McKnight's and Velasquez's performances and complimented the show's "musical value", calling it a "Valentine’s offering too tempting to resist". He continued to commend Velasquez's vocals during the duet numbers, saying, "Score a point for Filipino ability–which McKnight was only too willing to acknowledge". Maceda was also appreciative of McKnight's singing and his "equal dexterity with the guitar and keyboards". Similarly, the Manila Standard termed it "the most successful Valentine show of the year". The concert was recorded and later released in VHS and Video CD (VCD) format in June 2002.

== Set list ==
This set list is adapted from the live recording of Two for the Knight. (Note: Two for the Knight was released as a live recording in VHS and Video CD (VCD) format in June 2002.)

Regine Velasquez
1. "To Reach You"
2. "(I've Had) The Time of My Life"
3. "Never Too Far"
4. "Ikaw" / "Pangako" / "Kailangan Ko'y Ikaw"
5. "I Will Survive" / "If All Were Gonna Do Is Dance" / "Last Dance"
6. "Hanggang Ngayon"
7. "Go the Distance"
Brian McKnight
1. "Love Is" (performed with Velasquez)
2. "Whenever You Call" (performed with Velasquez)
3. "My Kind of Girl"
4. "6, 8, 12"
5. "Back at One"
6. "One Last Cry"

== See also ==
- List of Regine Velasquez live performances
