= Twenty (concert) =

2006 concert by Regine Velasquez

- Concert by Regine Velasquez
- Promotional poster for the show
- Location: Araneta Center, Quezon City, Philippines
- Venue: Araneta Coliseum
- Start date: October 13, 2006
- End date: October 14, 2006
- No. of shows: 2

Regine Velasquez concert chronology
- Reflections (2005); Twenty (2006); Ang Ating Musika (2007)

Twenty (also stylized as 20) (Note: Various media publications have referred to the concert's name as "Twenty" or "20".) was an arena concert by Filipino entertainer Regine Velasquez. It was announced in September 2006 and held on two consecutive nights in October 2006 at the Araneta Coliseum in Quezon City. Its concept and name is a reference to the 20th anniversary since her professional debut in 1986. The staging resembled a Roman colosseum connected by a grand staircase extending from the upper box gallery. The setlist predominantly contained songs taken from Velasquez's discography and various covers. The show was produced by Aria Productions, with GMA Network as its broadcast partner. Ronnie Henares served as stage director and Raul Mitra as musical director. Guest conductors were featured, including Louie Ocampo and Gerard Salonga, backed by the 60-member ensemble of the Manila Philharmonic Orchestra. It received positive reviews from music critics, who praised Velasquez's vocals and the production.

== Background and development ==
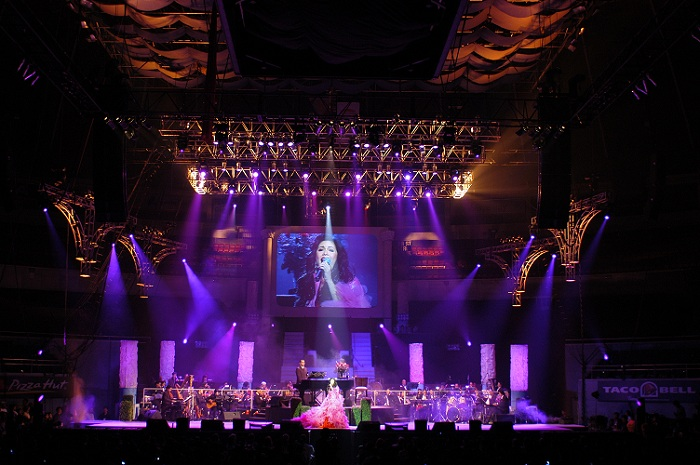
The stage was designed to resemble a Roman colosseum set up with pillars and a grand staircase

Regine Velasquez's career began with a record deal with OctoArts International and the release of her single "Love Me Again" in 1986. Initially introduced as Chona, she appeared on the variety show The Penthouse Live! and caught the attention of Ronnie Henares, a producer and talent manager who signed her to a management deal. She later adopted the stage name Regine at the suggestion of The Penthouse Live! host Martin Nievera. In 1996, Velasquez staged a show, named Isang Pasasalamat, at UPD's Sunken Garden to commemorate her then-ten-year-career.

On September 24, 2006, the Philippine Daily Inquirer published that Velasquez would headline a two-night concert to celebrate the 20th anniversary since her career debut. The show, titled Twenty, would be staged at the Araneta Coliseum on October 13–14 and exclusively promoted by Aria Productions. Velasquez stated, "It's a concert for the fans who have been with me for two decades. I will sing songs that are memorable, not only to me but also to my supporters." She further said that it was vital for her to challenge herself and still be passionate on every project:

It's true ... about my having changed my repertoire for the concert three times. And it's all because in the first two line-ups, I included a lot of songs, which I thought were people's favorites, not necessarily mine. But afterward, I realized, in all my concerts in the past I sang what I felt were peoples favorites. So, for the first time, let me sing songs that are my favorites and which had something to do with my career and my life at one time or another.

At the behest of Velasquez, Henares was tapped as the show's stage director, which marked their first collaboration since parting ways in 2003. Describing his involvement in the production as a "big honor", he said, "I've seen her grow and mature as a performer. She has not changed much but she has so much passion in her music now compared [to] before. And when it comes to giving ideas about her concert, she's really good at it. All I have to do is just put Regine's ideas into place." Raul Mitra served as musical director, accompanied by the 60-member ensemble of the Manila Philharmonic Orchestra. Several guest conductors also made special appearances during the show, including Louie Ocampo, Gerard Salonga, Mark Lopez, and Mon Faustino. The stage set up was built to resemble a Roman colosseum and featured a grand staircase extending from the upper box gallery.

== Synopsis and reception ==
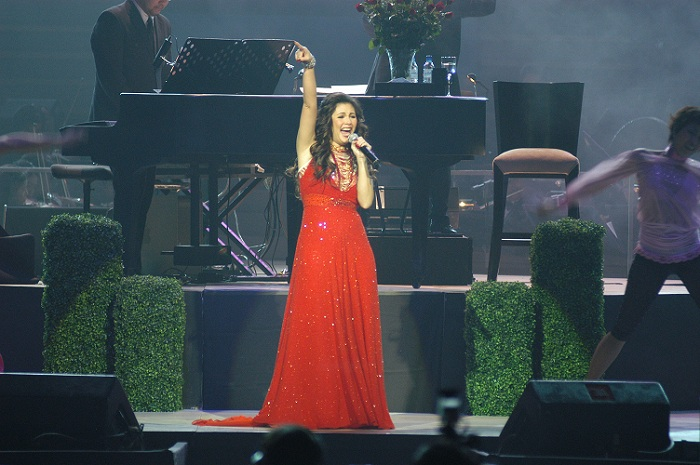
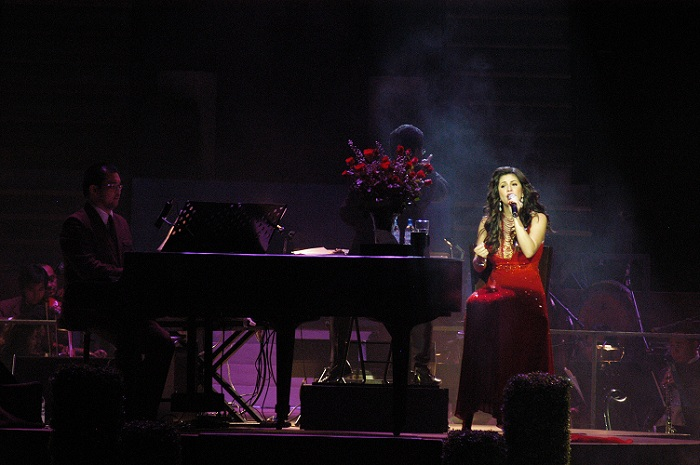
Velasquez doing a dance routine while performing "Hot Stuff" and "Shake Your Groove Thing" (left), and sitting next to the piano for "Sana Maulit Muli" (right)

The concert opened with Velasquez performing an operetta musical number telling the story of her career beginnings, before transitioning to "Narito Ako". Shortly after, she began a medley of "Hot Stuff" and "Shake Your Groove Thing" which contained samples of The Pussycat Dolls's "Buttons" and Don't Cha. She followed this with a performance of "Shine" and continued with an orchestral arrangement of "On the Wings of Love". For the next number, Velasquez sang the movie theme song "Music of Goodbye" while aerialists performed acrobatics. She then introduced conductor Louie Ocampo and began with "What Kind of Fool Am I?". The segment ended with Velasquez joined by various male singers as they sang a medley of her duets.

The setlist continued with guest conductor Mon Faustino at the helm of Velasquez's performance of "Sana Maulit Muli". Next, she began a Ogie Alcasid tribute number, before continuing with "I Don't Want to Miss a Thing". During the performance of "Love Me Again", Velasquez was joined by conductor Gerard Salonga. She spoke briefly to the crowd and thanked her parents, before performing Didith Reyes's "Bakit Ako Mahihiya" and a medley of songs she performed in talent competitions, including "You'll Never Walk Alone" and "And I Am Telling You I'm Not Going". After singing "Till I Met You", Velasquez closed the show with an encore performance of "The Greatest Love of All" and "I Believe".

The concert was met with a positive response from critics, who praised Velasquez's vocal abilities and the production. The Philippine Daily Inquirer's Ronald Mangubat described the show as "well-conceptualized" and "highly entertaining". He praised Velasquez's "bravura belting" and ability to sing "high notes with relative ease". He concluded, "[She did] what some singers failed to achieve—establish a strong connection to her audience". Jojo Panaligan from the Manila Bulletin wrote, "Regine has reached twenty years in the business because others, from past to present, could only approximate the power and impact of her voice. If this goes on, then so will she."

The concert was aired as a television special on GMA Network in 2006. Velasquez was named Best Female Major Concert Act and Entertainer of the Year at 20th Aliw Awards for the production.

== Set list ==
This set list is adapted from the television special Twenty. (Note: Twenty was aired as a television special on GMA Network in 2006.)

1. "Nais Ko" / "Narito Ako"
2. "Hot Stuff" / "Shake Your Groove Thing"
3. "Shine"
4. "On the Wings of Love"
5. "Music of Goodbye"
6. "What Kind of Fool Am I?"
7. "Please Be Careful with My Heart" / "Forever" / "It's Hard to Say Goodbye" / "Magkasuyo Buong Gabi" / "In Love with You" / "Hanggang Ngayon" / "Muli"
8. "Sana Maulit Muli"
9. "Kailangan Kita" / "Ikaw Lamang"
10. "I Don't Want to Miss a Thing"
11. "Love Me Again"
12. "Bakit Ako Mahihiya"
13. "In Your Eyes"
14. "You'll Never Walk Alone" / "And I Am Telling You I'm Not Going"
15. "Till I Met You"

Encore

16. "The Greatest Love of All" / "I Believe"

== Personnel ==
Credits and personnel are adapted from the television special Twenty.

Show

- Wilma Galvante – overall in charge of production
- Ronnie Henares – show direction, staging
- Regine Velasquez – show direction, staging
- Louie Ignacio – television director
- Raul Mitra – musical director
- Juel Balbon – executive producer
- Cacai Velasquez-Mitra – executive producer
- Corazon de Jesus – supervising producer
- Maro Garcia – associate producer
- Cez Urrutia – associate producer
- Hazel Abonita – production manager
- Liza Camus – production manager
- Epoy Isonera – stage manager
- Bodjie Singson – assistant stage manager
- Tess Padiernos – assistant stage director
- Jaime Mejia – lighting
- Jun Bon Rustico – sound engineer
- Mitoy Sta. Ana – set designer
- Rajo Laurel – costume design
- Pepsi Herrera – costume design
- Edwin Tan – costume design

Band

- Manila Philharmonic Orchestra
- U.P. Singing Ambassadors Choir
- Arturo Molina – conductor
- Gerard Salonga – guest conductor
- Louie Ocampo – guest conductor
- Mon Faustino – guest conductor
- Cesar Aguas – guitars
- Meong Pacana – guitars
- Sonny Matias – keyboards
- Bond Samson – keyboards
- Tek Faustino – drums
- Babsie Molina – background vocalist
- Sylvia Macaraeg – background vocalist
- Rene Martinez – background vocalist

== See also ==
- List of Regine Velasquez live performances
