= List of Regine Velasquez live performances =

Filipino artist live performances

Regine Velasquez live performances
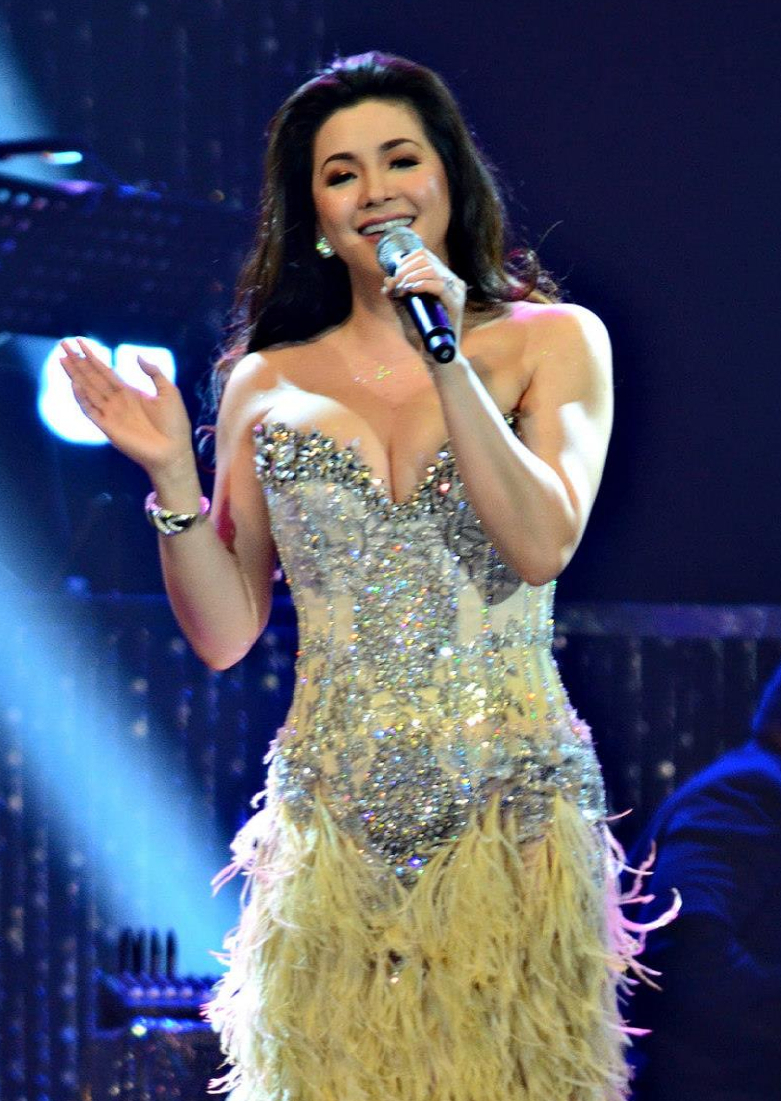
- Velasquez performing at her Mall of Asia Arena concert, Silver (2013)
- Headlining concerts: 21
- Co-headlining concerts: 26
- Concert residencies: 13
- Benefit concerts: 6

Filipino singer Regine Velasquez has headlined concerts and performed live at award ceremonies and on television specials. Her first live television performance came when she competed in the reality television talent show Ang Bagong Kampeon (1984), which she won with a performance of George Benson's "In Your Eyes". She released her first single, "Love Me Again", in 1986, under the name Chona. Since adopting the stage name Regine Velasquez, she appeared in televised performances on The Penthouse Live! and Triple Treat. She represented the Philippines at the 1989 Asia-Pacific Singing Contest, performing "You'll Never Walk Alone" and "And I Am Telling You I'm Not Going". She was a guest act for several performers, including Pops Fernandez, Kuh Ledesma, Martin Nievera and Gary Valenciano, and her debut concert, Regine at 17, was held at the Manila Midtown Hotel.

In 1990, Velasquez headlined Narito Ako, her first major concert, which was held at the Folk Arts Theater to promote her second studio album Nineteen 90, and made her North American concert debut at Carnegie Hall in New York City—a first for an Asian solo artist. She signed an international record deal and released the studio albums Listen Without Prejudice (1994), My Love Emotion (1995) and Retro (1996). During this period, Velasquez performed live at various events across Southeast and East Asia, including an appearance as opening and closing act at the Yoshinogari Ruins Music Festival in Saga Prefecture, Kyūshū, Japan. In April 1996, Velasquez staged Isang Pasasalamat, a concert commemorating her ten-year career, at UPD's Sunken Garden. To promote her tenth studio album, R2K (1999), she performed at Regine 2000, a three-day event at the Music Museum. In April 2000, she staged the R2K Concert at the Araneta Coliseum, which was critically acclaimed and earned Velasquez a live entertainment accolade from the Aliw Awards. She also performed a one-off concert at the Westin Philippine Plaza, which was recorded for her first live album, Regine Live: Songbird Sings the Classics (2000). That year, she co-headlined a show called Celebration of Love with Peabo Bryson and Jeffrey Osborne.

Velasquez received the inaugural Favorite Artist Philippines award at the 2002 MTV Asia Awards and performed "Cry" with Mandy Moore to promote the theatrical release of Moore's film A Walk to Remember. In April, at the National Museum of the Philippines, Velasquez headlined a benefit concert called One Night with Regine, which was a collaboration with ABS-CBN to benefit Bantay Bata Foundation's child abuse response fund. In the same year, she co-headlined Two for the Knight, a collaboration with Brian McKnight. In 2003, Velasquez collaborated with Michel Legrand and staged Songbird Sings Legrand at the PICC Plenary Hall. Later that year at Makati's Onstage Theatre, she headlined a twelve-date residency show named Songbird Sings Streisand, which was a tribute to Barbra Streisand.

At the Mall of Asia Arena in November 2012, Velasquez headlined Silver but the show was cut short after she lost her voice because of a viral infection—it was re-staged in January 2013. From 2013 to 2016, she co-headlined annual concerts at the Mall of Asia Arena: Foursome, Voices of Love, Ultimate and Royals. To promote her seventeenth studio album, R3.0 (2017), she staged a two-night show at the Mall of Asia Arena. In 2020, in support of relief efforts during the COVID-19 pandemic, Velasquez curated virtual benefit concerts One Night with Regine for Bantay Bata Foundation and Regine: Joy From Home for Jollibee Group Food Aid. She also released the single "Istorya", which she performed at the 25th Asian Television Awards and ASAP Natin 'To.

== Headlining concerts ==
List of headlining concerts, with dates, associated albums, venues and number of performances
Title	Date	Associated album(s)	Venue	City	Shows	Ref.
Narito Ako!	July 14, 1990	Nineteen 90	Folk Arts Theater	Manila	1	
Regine in Season	July 21, 1991	Nineteen 90	PhilSports Arena	Pasig	1	
Narito Ako sa New York!	October 11, 1991	Nineteen 90	Carnegie Hall	New York City	1	
A Song For You	August 1, 1992	Tagala Talaga	Folk Arts Theater	Manila	1	
Music & Me	July 30, 1993 – July 31, 1993	Reason Enough	Folk Arts Theater	Manila	2	
Isang Pasasalamat	April 20, 1996	None	UPD Sunken Garden	Quezon City	1	
Retro	July 18, 1997 – July 19, 1997	Retro	Folk Arts Theater	Manila	2	
Drawn	November 17, 1998 – December 5, 1998	Drawn	Music Museum	San Juan	4	
At Her Very Best	August 27, 1999	None	Westin Philippine Plaza	Pasay	1	
Regine 2000	December 3, 1999 – December 11, 1999	R2K	Music Museum	San Juan	3	
R2K: The Concert	April 7, 2000 – April 8, 2000	R2K	Araneta Coliseum	Quezon City	2	
Songbird Sings the Classics	October 11, 2000	Regine Live: Songbird Sings the Classics	Westin Philippine Plaza	Pasay	1	
Regine Live in Antipolo	December 30, 2000	None	Ynares Center	Antipolo	1	
R-15	April 21, 2001	None	Manila Hotel	Manila	1	
Reigning Still	December 3, 2004 – December 4, 2004	Covers, Vol. 1	Araneta Coliseum	Quezon City	2	
Twenty	October 13, 2006 – October 14, 2006	None	Araneta Coliseum	Quezon City	2	
Regine Most Requested	August 1, 2009 – August 8, 2009	None	SkyDome	Quezon City	2	
Silver	November 16, 2012; January 5, 2013	None	Mall of Asia Arena	Pasay	2	
R3.0	October 21, 2017 – October 22, 2017	R3.0	Mall of Asia Arena	Pasay	2	
Freedom	February 28, 2021	None	Virtual	Quezon City (Note: Freedom was produced by ABS-CBN Events and filmed at their studios in Quezon City.)	1	
Regine Rocks	November 25, 2023; April 19, 2024	None	Mall of Asia Arena	Pasay	2	

== Co-headlining concerts ==
List of co-headlining concerts, with co-headliners, dates, venues and number of performances
Title	Co-headliner(s)	Date	Venue	City	Shows	Ref.
Foolish Hearts	Janno Gibbs	February 13, 1991 – February 14, 1991	PICC Plenary Hall	Pasay	2	
Voices	Martin Nievera	October 4, 1991 – October 5, 1991	PhilSports Arena	Pasig	2	
Dream Team	Janno Gibbs; The Tux	March 13, 1993	Folk Arts Theater	Manila	1	
For the Record	Martin Nievera; Zsa Zsa Padilla; Gary Valenciano	August 7, 1993	Folk Arts Theater	Manila	1	
Two Hearts, One Beat	Ariel Rivera	July 15, 1994 – July 16, 1994	PICC Plenary Hall	Pasay	2	
Power of Two	Kuh Ledesma	June 15, 1996 – July 13, 1996	Music Museum	San Juan	5	
A Love Affair	Janno Gibbs	February 13, 1997 – February 14, 1997	PICC Plenary Hall	Pasay	2	
Celebration of Love	Peabo Bryson; Jeffrey Osborne	November 10, 2000 – November 11, 2000	Araneta Coliseum	Quezon City	2	
Independent Women	Jaya	February 10, 2001	PICC Plenary Hall	Pasay	1	
Two for the Knight	Brian McKnight	February 14, 2002 – February 15, 2002	Araneta Coliseum	Quezon City	2	
Songbird Sings Legrand	Michel Legrand	February 14, 2003 – February 16, 2003	PICC Plenary Hall	Pasay	3	
Martin & Regine: The World Concert Tour	Martin Nievera	May 9, 2003 – July 5, 2003	Araneta Coliseum	Quezon City	4	
The Songbird & The Songwriter	Ogie Alcasid	February 13, 2004 – February 14, 2004	Araneta Coliseum	Quezon City	2	
Queens on Fire	Pops Fernandez	February 11, 2005 – February 12, 2005	PhilSports Arena	Pasig	2	
Forever After	Ogie Alcasid; Ai-Ai delas Alas	February 10, 2006 – February 11, 2006	Araneta Coliseum	Quezon City	2	
Divas 4 Divas	Pops Fernandez; Kuh Ledesma; Zsa Zsa Padilla	December 6, 2008	Araneta Coliseum	Quezon City	1	
Mr. & Mrs. A	Ogie Alcasid	February 14, 2012	Araneta Coliseum	Quezon City	1	
Foursome	Ogie Alcasid; Pops Fernandez; Martin Nievera	February 14, 2013	Araneta Coliseum	Quezon City	1	
Voices of Love	Martin Nievera	February 14, 2014	Araneta Coliseum	Quezon City	1	
Ultimate	Lani Misalucha; Martin Nievera; Gary Valenciano	February 13, 2015 – February 14, 2015	Mall of Asia Arena	Pasay	2	
Royals	Martin Nievera; Angeline Quinto; Erik Santos	February 13, 2016 – February 14, 2016	Mall of Asia Arena	Pasay	2	
#PaMore	Martin Nievera; Angeline Quinto; Erik Santos	February 12, 2018	Mall of Asia Arena	Pasay	1	
The Songbird & The Songhorse	Vice Ganda	February 14, 2019 – February 16, 2019	Araneta Coliseum	Quezon City	3	
Iconic	Sharon Cuneta	October 18, 2019 – October 19, 2019	Araneta Coliseum	Quezon City	2	
Unified	Sarah Geronimo	February 14, 2020 – February 15, 2020	Araneta Coliseum	Quezon City	2	
Super Divas: The Concert	Vice Ganda	August 8, 2025 – August 9, 2025	Araneta Coliseum	Quezon City	2	

== Concert residencies ==
List of concerts residencies, with dates, venues and number of performances
Title	Date	Venue	City	Shows	Ref.
Regine at Circus Circus	July 1, 1987 – August 19, 1987; November 5, 1988 – December 28, 1988	Circus Circus Music Lounge	Manila	11	
Regine… of Age	October 12, 1988 – December 7, 1988	Birdland	Manila	8	
Sangkatutux Na… Regine Pa!	February 2, 1990 – March 22, 1990	Music Museum	San Juan	12	
Regine Animated	December 8, 1994 – December 17, 1994	Music Museum	San Juan	6	
Regine Unplugged	August 11, 1995 – December 23, 1995	Music Museum	San Juan	6	
Regine at the Movies	November 9, 2001 – December 30, 2001	Onstage Theatre	Makati	17	
Songbird Sings	November 8, 2002 – December 28, 2002	Onstage Theatre	Makati	15	
Songbird Sings Streisand	November 14, 2003 – December 20, 2003	Onstage Theatre	Makati	12	
Reflections	November 4, 2005 – December 10, 2005	Aliw Theater	Pasay	8	
Ang Ating Musika	November 9, 2007 – November 24, 2007	Aliw Theater	Pasay	6	
Regine at the Theater	November 6, 2015 – November 21, 2015	The Theatre at Solaire	Parañaque	4	
Regine at the Movies	November 17, 2018 – November 25, 2018	New Frontier Theater	Quezon City	3	
Solo	February 17, 2023 – April 29, 2023	Samsung Performing Arts Theater	Makati	6	

== Benefit concerts ==
List of benefit concerts, with dates, venues and number of performances
Title	Date	Venue	City	Shows	Ref.
Songbird Sings for the River	April 30, 1999	MET Museum	Manila	1	
One Night with Regine	April 26, 2002	National Museum of the Philippines	Manila	1	
One Enchanting Songbird	May 27, 2003	Le Pavillon	Pasay	1	
Bridges of Love	September 18, 2003	Makati Shangri-La	Makati	1	
One Night with Regine	April 25, 2020	Virtual	Quezon City (Note: The digital benefit concerts were filmed at Velasquez's residence in Quezon City.)	1	
Regine: Joy From Home	June 7, 2020	Virtual	Quezon City	1	
