= Barangay Apo =

Studio album by Apo Hiking Society
- Released: 1993
- Genre: Original Pilipino Music, Filipino rock, pop
- Label: Universal Records, Philippines

Apo Hiking Society chronology
1-2-3 (1992)	''Barangay Apo'' (1993)	Dating Alternatib (1996)

Barangay Apo is the fourteenth studio album of the Filipino trio Apo Hiking Society. It's a 9-track album released in 1993 under Universal Records.

== Track listing ==
1. Kating-kati at Di Mapakali (3:03)
2. Alam Niya (3:29)
3. Todo Bigay (4:23)
4. Consuelo (2:27)
5. Mamahalin Kita (3:26)
6. Suntok sa Buwan (4:16)
7. Sorry! (3:40)
8. Sa Liham Na Lang (4:36)
9. Nadale Na Naman (4:00)

== Related links ==
- The Official Apo Hiking Society Website
