= Sandra (song) =

Song by Barry Manilow

from the album Barry Manilow II
- Released: 1974
- Recorded: 1974
- Genre: Pop
- Length: 4:35
- Label: Bell
- Songwriter(s): Barry Manilow, Enoch Anderson

Barry Manilow singles chronology
"My Baby Loves Me" (1974)	"Sandra" (1974)	"Home Again" (1974)

"Sandra" is a song written by Barry Manilow and Enoch Anderson. A piano-based ballad, the song takes the voice of a lonely housewife looking back at missed opportunities, because she married at an early age. It was originally recorded by Manilow on his album, Barry Manilow II in 1974. Dusty Springfield covered the song on her 1978 album It Begins Again. In a contemporary interview with Music Week, Springfield praised the song's "own inbuilt drama" and considered it to be more personal when sung by a woman. Entertainer Bruce Forsyth recorded a version for his 1975 album The Bruce Forsyth Album. This version was Forsyth's first American single release, on Warner Bros.
