= R2K: The Concert =

2000 concert by Regine Velasquez

- Promotional concert by Regine Velasquez
- Promotional poster for the concert
- Location: Araneta Center, Quezon City, Philippines
- Venue: Araneta Coliseum
- Associated album: R2K
- Start date: April 7, 2000
- End date: April 8, 2000
- No. of shows: 2

Regine Velasquez concert chronology
- Regine 2000 (1999); R2K: The Concert (2000); Songbird Sings the Classics (2000)

R2K: The Concert was the first arena concert by Filipino entertainer Regine Velasquez, held on April 7 and 8, 2000, at the Araneta Coliseum in Quezon City. It was a part of Velasquez's promotion of her tenth studio album, R2K (1999). It was exclusively promoted by Viva Concerts, with beauty brands Pond's and Sunsilk as sponsors. Velasquez served as the stage and creative director for the show, which featured Ogie Alcasid, Gabby Eigenmann, Janno Gibbs, Jaya, and KC Montero as guest acts.

The concert's production and staging featured a 360-degree configuration with a semi-circular plexiglass stage, four large video screens, and an automated flying rig used during Velasquez's aerial performance of "On the Wings of Love" and "Butterfly". She collaborated on outfits with designer Rajo Laurel, who drew inspiration from Dolce & Gabbana's "print-on-print" collection. The set list included songs predominantly taken from R2K and various covers of pop hits from 1999 and 2000; these included "Larger than Life" by the Backstreet Boys and a medley of "If You Had My Love", "Waiting for Tonight", and "Let's Get Loud" by Jennifer Lopez, which she performed as part of the opening set.

R2K: The Concert received generally positive reviews from music critics, who praised Velasquez's showmanship and vocal abilities, as well as the stage production. Critics also lauded the costumes and her look during the concert. For her work, Velasquez was awarded Best Female Major Concert Act at the 13th Aliw Awards. The show was broadcast in its entirety on June 21, 2000, on Viva TV.

== Background and development ==
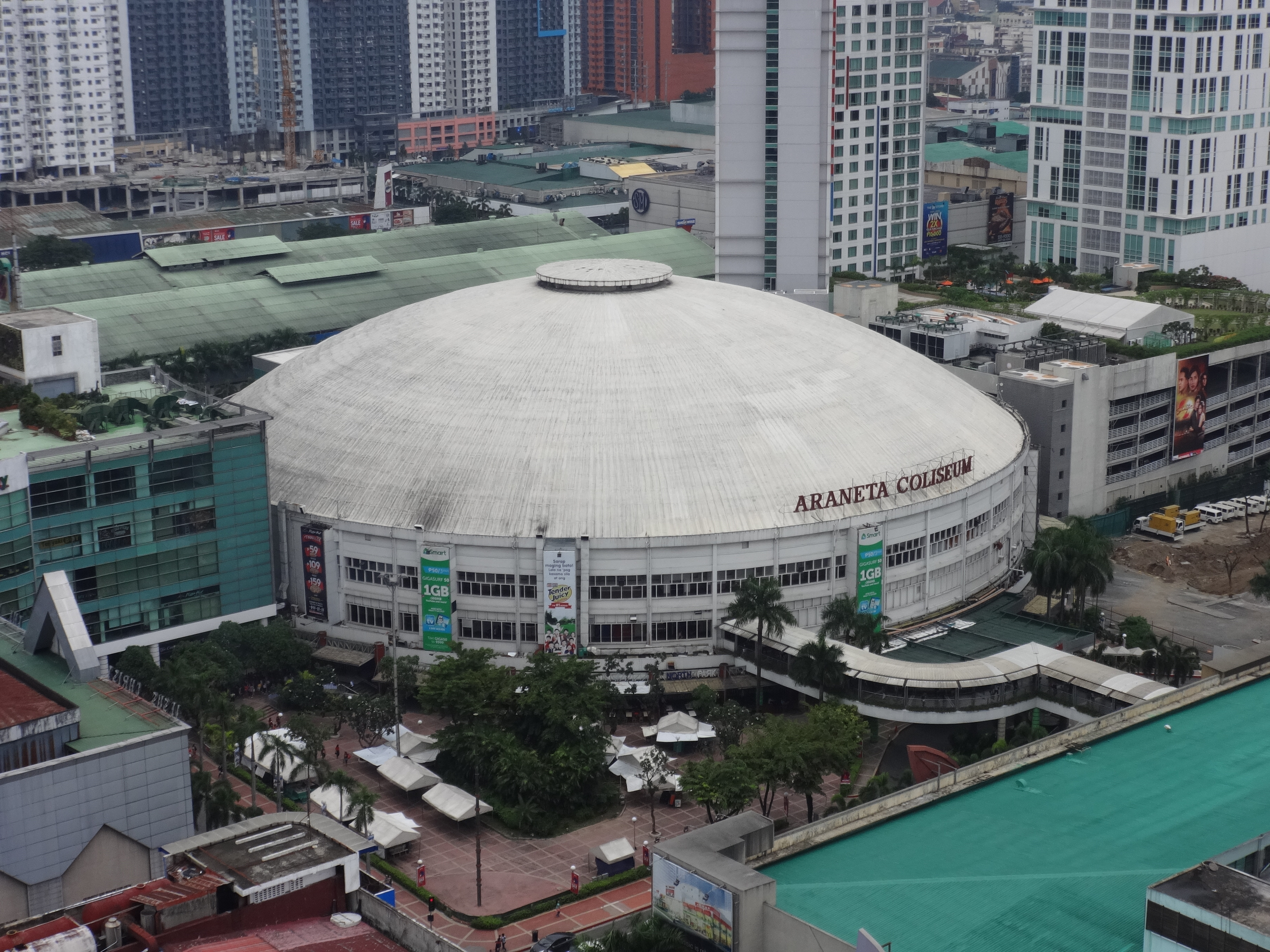
The Araneta Coliseum in Quezon City, where the concert took place

Regine Velasquez released her tenth studio album, R2K, on November 27, 1999. A cover album, it contains remakes of pop music from the 1970s and 1980s, issued with a bonus Video CD (VCD) of six music videos for its tracks, including Bread's "Lost Without Your Love" and George Benson's "In Your Eyes". Velasquez became the first Filipino artist to release an album with an accompanying VCD. The album was a commercial success, selling over 40,000 copies in the second week of release and earning a platinum certification from the Philippine Association of the Record Industry. As part of the album's promotion, Velasquez performed in small venues, which included a three-day event at the Music Museum called Regine 2000. In January 2000, Velasquez's publicist Hanzel Villafuerte revealed that she was planning a headlining concert in April. The following month, it was announced that Velasquez would perform two dates on April 7–8, at the Araneta Coliseum. The show's producers, Viva Concerts, officially named it R2K: The Concert, and partnered with beauty brands Pond's and Sunsilk as sponsors. Velasquez and her team selected Ogie Alcasid, Gabby Eigenmann, Janno Gibbs, Jaya, and KC Montero as special guests.

Unlike Velasquez's previous concerts—which were staged at the Folk Arts Theater, a 9,000-seat music venue—the concert was her first performance in a large-scale indoor arena. Velasquez stated that she was excited, yet nervous about the show: "It's my first time to perform at such a big venue. For the longest time, my manager wanted me to do it, but I felt I wasn't ready yet." Velasquez was heavily involved in planning and production, and revealed that rehearsals and preparations for it made her anxious. The Philippine Daily Inquirer previewed that it would be her "biggest and most expensive concert to date", adding that her main objective was to deliver performances that "range from pop, ballads, rock and even rap". She asserted, "I do this mainly to entertain ... I'm not out to prove anything. I just hope the public enjoys my performance". Velasquez served as stage and creative director, while Marc Lopez and Louie Ignacio were chosen as musical and television directors, respectively.

External videos
- Regine Velasquez talking to Jeepney TV on conceptualizing her aerial performance during R2K: The Concert, published February 19, 2019

The show featured a 360-degree configuration with an end-stage setup and four large video screens. The two-tiered stage design included a semi-circular plexiglass main platform, which connected to the upper stage by twin staircases. The central area of the stage was spaced for the musicians and background vocalists. The concert included elements of pyrotechnics and aerial suspension. Velasquez had been toying with the idea of doing an aerial performance after seeing Paula Abdul's Under My Spell Tour (1992) in Manila, and took inspiration from Abdul being transported by wires during a performance of "Spellbound". Velasquez presented the concept to her team and had an automated flying rig custom-built to be used for "On the Wings of Love".

Velasquez commissioned Rajo Laurel to create all her costumes during the show. The designer was inspired by Dolce & Gabbana's "print-on-print" collection, paying attention to "postmodern outfits" that embodied "elegance and high style". The opening outfit consisted of a black leather bodysuit with a monochromatic opera coat and accompanying knee high boots. For a quick costume change after the opening segment, Laurel produced a gold metallic spaghetti-strapped top, incorporating a psychedelic micro-mini skirt over animal print tights. Another piece worn by Velasquez during her aerial number was a yellow gown embellished with butterfly appliqués, which was accentuated with long skirt panels, and a black backless long gown patterned with sheer fabrics that bared the singer's midriff, upper thighs, and legs.

== Concert synopsis ==
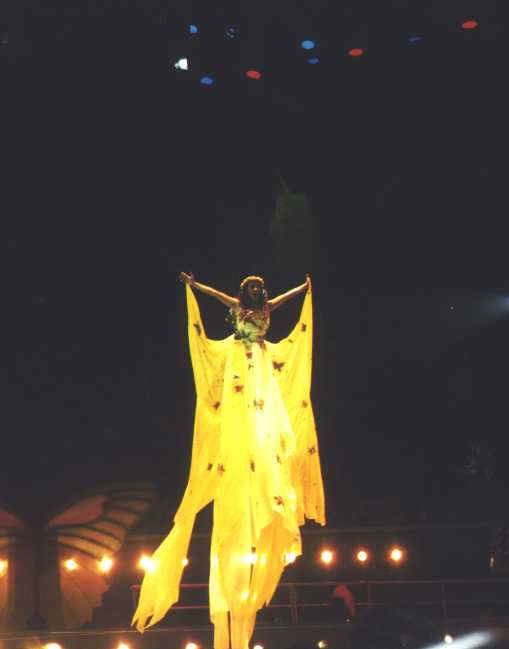
Considered the highlight of the show, Velasquez's aerial performance received positive critical reception (top). The concert's final act included a performance of Aerosmith's "I Don't Want to Miss a Thing" (1998) amidst a display of pyrotechnics (bottom).

The concert opened with a video montage showing images of Velasquez and footage from her music videos, films, and past live performances. As dancers lifted by wires performing aerial acrobatics descend, Velasquez sang excerpts from the chorus of the Backstreet Boys' "Larger than Life" (1999), before disappearing offstage. She reappeared on the upper stage and continued the song while dancing. After a costume change, Velasquez began a medley of Jennifer Lopez's "If You Had My Love", "Waiting for Tonight", and "Let's Get Loud". She then sat centerstage for a performance of the Carpenters' "One Love" (1971), transitioning directly into Dionne Warwick's "I'll Never Love This Way Again" (1979). The next segment opened with Velasquez performing ABBA's "Dancing Queen" (1976), which was mashed with Orleans's "Dance With Me" (1974). It was followed with a performance of "I Believe" (1953) and "The Prayer" (1999) alongside Ogie Alcasid and Janno Gibbs.

During the performance of "On the Wings of Love" (1982), Velasquez was lifted by wires, revealing long skirt panels adorned with butterfly appliqués that billowed out around her as if she was flying towards the audience. At the end of the performance, she sat down and spoke to the crowd about falling out of love, before performing Teri DeSario's "Fallin'" (1979). She closed the segment with Mariah Carey's "Butterfly" (1997), during which she was taken back to the upper stage by wires.

The setlist continued with the Isley Brothers' "For the Love of You" (1975), where Velasquez was joined by Eigenmann and Montero. The duo added a rap routine to the number. She then sang a duet of "Habang May Buhay" (1994) with Jaya, which was followed by a debut performance of "Kailangan Ko'y Ikaw", the main theme song of Velasquez's film of the same name. After confessing how she enjoyed recording love themes for films, Velasquez stated, "I never realized that one day, I would be able to sing the theme songs of my own movies", before she sang a medley of her film soundtracks. She then sat by the staircase for an acoustic performance of "Sana Maulit Muli", before continuing with Celine Dion's "That's the Way It Is" (1999).

For the final act, Velasquez sang a ballad version of Aerosmith's "I Don't Wanna Miss a Thing" (1998) with a brief pyrotechnics display at the conclusion of the number. After the song ended, she thanked the audience before exiting the stage. She performed "Written in the Sand" for the encore, which she had introduced as a song she interpreted during the millennium television special 2000 Today. She closed the show with a medley of 1980s music: "Fame", "Flashdance... What a Feeling", "Build Me Up Buttercup", and "Here Comes the Rain Again".

== Reception and recordings ==
The concert was met with positive responses from critics, who praised Velasquez's showmanship and vocal abilities. Ricky Lo of The Philippine Star described the show as a "fully loaded electrifying concert" and complimented Velasquez's "boundless energy and creativity". He appreciated how much work went into preparing for the show. Ramil Gulle, also from The Philippine Star, acknowledged that Velasquez's concert lived up to expectations, writing: "She put up a show that quite no other Filipino pop artist has." He commended her maturity and favored her ability to sing with "proper nuances" and "more heart", asserting that the show was a reminder of Velasquez's theatrics and vocal talents. Writing for the Manila Standard, Isah Red considered its production and vocal performances a benchmark against which other Philippine concerts can be measured.

Critics agreed that the highlight of the night was Velasquez's aerial performance. Lo termed it a "decidedly daring or risky action", while in a 2017 retrospective, Elvin Luciano from CNN Philippines argued that it was one of Velasquez's most memorable moments. Her fashion during the show also received praise. Red described Velasquez's costumes as "grand and lavish", adding that "the colors and the cuts made our eyes look and appreciate the designs". Alex Vergara of the Philippine Daily Inquirer commented that the outfits "did dazzle the audience and suit [Velasquez's] unique flair onstage". Although critics were appreciative of Velasquez's vocals, some were critical of her spiels; Red wrote, "They just didn't work ... the script was confused in capturing [Velasquez's] character. Similarly, Vergara said, "We're clueless on who wrote the script ... was there one at all?"

Velasquez received the Best Female Major Concert Act award at the 13th Aliw Awards for the production. Segments from the concert were filmed for the opening scenes of Velasquez's romantic film Kailangan Ko'y Ikaw (2000). The film featured multiple snippets of live performances from the show, including "On the Wings of Love". The concert was also aired as a television special on June 21, 2000, on Viva TV.

== Set list ==
This set list is representative of the second performance on April 8, 2000.

1. "Larger than Life"
2. "If You Had My Love" / "Waiting for Tonight" / "Let's Get Loud"
3. "One Love"
4. "I'll Never Love This Way Again"
5. "Dancing Queen" / "Dance With Me"
6. "The Prayer"/ "I Believe" (with Ogie Alcasid and Janno Gibbs)
7. "On the Wings of Love"
8. "Fallin'"
9. "Butterfly"
10. "For the Love of You" (with Gabby Eigenmann and KC Montero)
11. "Habang May Buhay" (with Jaya)
12. "Kailangan Ko'y Ikaw"
13. "You Are My Song" / "I Can" / "Tunay na Ligaya" / "Ikaw"
14. "Sana Maulit Muli"
15. "That's the Way It Is"
16. "I Don't Wanna Miss a Thing"

Encore

17. "Written in the Sand"
18. "Fame" / "Flashdance... What a Feeling" / "Build Me Up Buttercup" / "Here Comes the Rain Again"

== Personnel ==
Credits and personnel are adapted from R2K: The Concert television special.

Show

- Regine Velasquez – show direction, staging
- Louie Ignacio – television director
- Marc Lopez – musical director
- Rajo Laurel – costume design
- Jay Feliciano – hair and make-up
- Patty Mayoralgo – production manager
- Peggy Sangco – assistant production manager
- John Batalla – lighting
- Willy Munji – sound engineer
- Epoy Isorena – stage manager
- Ed Murillo – assistant stage manager
- Jo Tecson – stage design

Band

- Marvin Querido – keyboards
- Rica Arambulo – keyboards
- Cesar Aguas – guitars
- Noel Mendez – guitars
- Sonny Azurin – guitars
- Niño Regalado – drums
- Bo Razon – percussion
- Romy Francisco – brass
- Boogie Abarico – brass
- Dix Lucero – brass
- Ronnie Marquese – brass
- Babsie Molina – background vocalist
- Kitchie Molina – background vocalist
- Sylvia Macaraeg – background vocalist
- Rene Martinez – background vocalist
- Cecile Aurellado – background vocalist
- Sushi Reyes – background vocalist
- Manolo Tanquilot – background vocalist
- Zebedee Zuñiga – background vocalist

Executive producer

- Vic del Rosario

Dancers

- Hotlegs

== See also ==
- List of Regine Velasquez live performances
