= Bantay Bata =

Social welfare program in the Philippines

Bantay Bata 163
- The official logo of the program.
- Formation: February 14, 1997; 29 years ago
- Founder: Gina Lopez
- Headquarters: Mother Ignacia (corner Scout Albano), 1103 Quezon City, Philippines
- Location: n/a (various locations)
- Key people: Mark Lopez (Chairman); Ernie Lopez (Executive Director)
- Website: bantay-bata.com

Bantay Bata 163 (transl. Child Watch 163; Tagalog: [banˈtaɪ ˈbaːtaʔ]) is a social welfare program of ABS-CBN Foundation. Launched in 1997, it aims to protect disadvantaged and at-risk children through a nationwide network of social services. Among these services is the national emergency hotline, '163', which allows people to call in and report incidents of child abuse, exploitation and neglect.

Bantay Bata has offices in the major cities in the Philippines which allows it to respond immediately to the emergency calls. They are also able to offer online counseling for child-family relationships and assist victims of child sexual exploitation. The program also works with the national and local government agencies, such as the Department of Social Welfare and Development (DSWD).

From its establishment, Bantay Bata has become one of the most widely supported causes in the Philippines.

== History ==
Bantay Bata 163 was established on February 14, 1997, as a hotline and rescue operation of the ABS-CBN Foundation. Though the ABS-CBN Regional it expanded its service in these following areas:

- Davao - August 2000
- Cebu and Iloilo - January 2005
- Bicol and Zamboanga - February 2006
- Negros - 2007
- Pangasinan - October 2008
- Laguna and General Santos - February 2012

Before the centralized hotline was launched in July 2005, regional hotline was different from city to city.

On August 31, 2020, some services of Bantay Bata 163 discontinued as part of the retrenchment by ABS-CBN Corporation, due to denial of ABS-CBN's legislative franchise by the House of Representatives on July 10, 2020.

== Projects ==
=== Children’s Crisis Center ===
Bantay Bata also operates and provides a temporary shelter to rescued children before their cases are resolved legally. Children are provided with therapy and educational opportunities before they are reunited with their families or referred to proper child caring agencies.

=== Children's Village ===
Bantay Bata also established a Children’s Village to house and care for children who require further attention. Located in the outskirts of Metropolitan Manila, the Children's Village provides health and wellness care, nutrition, education and psychological development for these disadvantaged and at-risk kids.

Philippine President Gloria Macapagal-Arroyo led the groundbreaking ceremonies of the Bantay Bata 163 Children's Village March 29 in Norzagaray, Bulacan. The Village was officially opened on May 10, 2003, and inaugurated in November of the same year. Its construction was the collaboration of efforts by various companies and supporters who have generously donated their resources to build this paradise for the children.

=== Child Trafficking ===
Bantay Bata 163 is also actively involved in combatting and dealing with the problems of Child Trafficking in the Philippines. This includes: The act of trading or dealing with children, including but not limited to, the buying and selling children for money, or for any other consideration, or barter; and sexual exploitation wherein, children whether male or female, who for money, profit or any other consideration or due to the coercion or influence of any adult, syndicate or group, indulge in sexual intercourse or lascivious conduct, are deemed to be children exploited in prostitution and other sexual abuse.

=== Services ===
1. Direct Child Protective Services
2. Residential Services
3. Community and Family Support Services

=== Bantay Bata Regional Services ===
- Bicol Region
- Cebu
- Davao Region
- Soccsksargen
- Iloilo City
- Bacolod
- Eastern Visayas
- Pangasinan
- Laguna
- Batangas
- Palawan
- Mindoro
- Zamboanga City
- Cagayan de Oro
- Caraga
- Taguig
