= Regine at the Movies =

2001 concert residency by Regine Velasquez

- Residency by Regine Velasquez
- Promotional poster for the 2001 residency
- Location: Metro Manila, Philippines
- Venue: Music Museum; Onstage Theater; New Frontier Theater
- Dates: November 9, 2001 – December 30, 2001; November 17, 2018 – November 25, 2018
- Legs: 2
- No. of shows: 20

Regine Velasquez concert chronology
- R-15 (2001); Regine at the Movies (2001); Two for the Knight (2002)

Regine at the Movies was a concert residency by Filipino singer Regine Velasquez at the Music Museum in San Juan and the Onstage Theater in Makati. The residency began on November 9 and concluded on December 30, 2001, after completing seventeen shows. The set list featured various covers of film soundtracks, including Velasquez's movie themes. The show was exclusively promoted by Maximedia International. In November 2018, ABS-CBN produced the re-staging of the residency which was held during three non-consecutive nights in November at the New Frontier Theater. Gabby Eigenmann was the guest act during the 2001 series, while Sharon Cuneta, Daniel Padilla, and Piolo Pascual were selected for the 2018 shows. Raul Mitra served as musical director for both productions. It received a positive reception from music critics, who praised the intimate show and Velasquez's vocal abilities.

== Background and development ==
On October 21, 2001, the Philippine Daily Inquirer announced that Regine Velasquez partnered with promoter Maximedia International to perform twelve shows in November and December at the Music Museum in San Juan and the Onstage Theater in Makati. The set on each night would be a collection of film soundtracks, including movie theme songs recorded by Velasquez. Raul Mitra was announced as musical director, while Gabby Eigenmann was selected as guest act. On the week of the last two performances, Maximedia added five more shows, bringing the number to seventeen. Velasquez described the song selection process as an "eye-opener" and added that she hoped to "bring the good ones from the silver screen to the stage".

I am very excited about this show. I realize how important music is in films. The songs and not to mention the score, certainly enhance emotions and gives the scenes the kind of impact the director of the movie has envisioned, otherwise movies would be very bland without music.

In October 2018, Velasquez signed a two-year network deal with ABS-CBN. One of her initial collaborations with the network was the re-staging of the concert residency for three non-consecutive nights on November 17, 24, and 25, at the New Frontier Theater in Quezon. Mitra remained as the show's music director, while guest performers for each night were Piolo Pascual, Sharon Cuneta, and Daniel Padilla, respectively.

== Synopsis ==
=== 2001 shows ===
The concert opened with a rendition of the theme from Dirty Dancing (1987), "(I've Had) The Time of My Life". Shortly after, Velasquez sang the ballads "How Do I Live", "Because You Loved Me", and "My Heart Will Go On". She followed this with a medley of movie themes from the 1970s and 1980s, such as Tootsie's "It Might Be You" and Arthur's "Best That You Can Do". Next was another blend of covers, "I'll Never Say "Goodbye" and "Looking Through the Eyes of Love", before performing a duet of "Cruisin'" with Gabby Eigenmann. At this point, she sang "You Are My Song" from her film Wanted: Perfect Mother (1996).

Velasquez spoke to the audience about her fascination with Baz Luhrmann's musical film Moulin Rouge! and continued to sing a medley of songs from the soundtrack album. After these covers, Velasquez then performed the love themes from her romantic films, which included "Ikaw", "Pangako", and "Kailangan Ko'y Ikaw". After performing Mariah Carey's "Never Too Far", the setlist continued with Barbra Streisand's "The Way We Were" and "No Matter What Happens". She then sang "Flashdance... What a Feeling", followed by a medley of themes from Julia Roberts's films, "Fallen" from Pretty Woman (1990), "When You Say Nothing at All" from Notting Hill (1999), "All the Love in the World" from America's Sweethearts (2001), and "I Say a Little Prayer" from My Best Friend's Wedding (1997). Velasquez closed the show with the West Side Story's "Somewhere", and an encore performance of "I Don't Want to Miss a Thing".

=== 2018 shows ===
The performances of the songs during the 2001 shows that remained, include "My Heart Will Go On", "Flashdance... What a Feeling", "Never Too Far", "You Are My Song", and "I Don't Want to Miss a Thing". The 2018 setlist opened with Whitney Houston's "I Will Always Love You" from The Bodyguard transitioning directly into Survivor's "Eye of the Tiger" from Rocky III (1982). These numbers were then followed by Adam Levine's "Lost Stars", Mandy Moore's "Only Hope", and Aaliyah's "Journey to the Past".

Throughout the three-day shows, modified setlists were used. Velasquez continued to perform the soundtracks of her films, such as "Paano Kita Iibigin", "Till I Met You", and "Kailangan Ko'y Ikaw". A medley of themes from the James Bond franchise and A Star Is Born films were also performed. Velasquez then sang renditions of Roxette's "It Must Have Been Love" and Irving Berlin's "White Christmas", before doing a Henry Mancini tribute number. The show closed with the main theme song from Armageddon (1998). Justin Timberlake's "Can't Stop the Feeling!" was used for the encore of the show.

== Reception and recordings ==
The concerts were met with positive responses from critics, who praised the intimate show and Velasquez's vocal abilities. Rina Jimenez-David of the Philippine Daily Inquirer described the show as "nostalgic" and a "night of real entertainment". She commended Velasquez's performances and her "wonderfully down-to-earth spiels". Jimenez David said, "An intimate venue seems to fit [Velasquez] perfectly, allowing her greater rapport with her audience whom she by turns teases, cajoles, charms, and even poses with." Leah Salterio, also from the Philippine Daily Inquirer, was appreciative of the selection of movie theme songs and lauded Velasquez's "lung power" in performing "vocally challenging hit[s]". Salterio added, "[Velasquez] simply belted out one hit song after another", and further noted the singer's "trademark histrionics which she unabashedly displayed".

In a review of the 2018 show, Salterio wrote: "After more than three decades of performing, Velasquez still displayed her admirable vocal range in song after song, which delighted her audience, who couldn’t seem to have enough of [her] that night." Media critic Allan Policarpio commented, "If there was one good thing that could be gleaned from the mercurial temperament of [Velasquez's] voice these days, it is that it has somehow brought out in her a renewed sense of enthusiasm that was most apparent after getting through a demanding piece." He continued to praise her emotional connection and stage presence. Policarpio concluded by writing, "[Velasquez] made sure to remind everyone of what she was capable of, and why she’s one of the country’s most influential vocalists."

The 2001 concert was aired as a two-part television special on February 15 and 22, 2002 on RPN network. On November 24, 2018, the second night of the show was broadcast via pay-per-view livestreaming on Kapamilya Box Office. For the 2018 production, Velasquez received nominations for Female Concert Performer Of The Year from the Star Awards for Music and the Box Office Entertainment Awards, and won the latter.

== Set list ==
2001
1. "(I've Had) The Time of My Life"
2. "How Do I Live"
3. "I Want to Spend My Lifetime Loving You"
4. "Because You Loved Me"
5. "My Heart Will Go On"
6. "Can You Read My Mind?" / "It Might Be You" / "Foolish Heart" / "Do You Know Where You're Going To" / "Arthur's Theme (Best That You Can Do)" / "Got to Believe in Magic"
7. "The Promise (I'll Never Say "Goodbye)" / "Looking Through the Eyes of Love"
8. "Cruisin'" (with Gabby Eigenmann)
9. "You Are My Song"
10. "To Reach You"
11. "Nature Boy" / "Your Song" / "One Day I'll Fly Away" / "Come What May"
12. "Ikaw" / "Pangako" / "Kailangan Ko'y Ikaw"
13. "Never Too Far"
14. "Tuwing Umuulan"
15. "The Way We Were" / "No Matter What Happens"
16. "Flashdance... What a Feeling" / "Fame"
17. "Fallen" / "When You Say Nothing at All" / "All the Love in the World" / "I Say a Little Prayer"
18. "Somewhere"

Encore

19. "I Don't Want to Miss a Thing"
2018
1. "I Will Always Love You"
2. "Eye of the Tiger"
3. "Flashdance... What a Feeling"
4. "Lost Stars"
5. "Only Hope"
6. "Journey to the Past"
7. "Never Too Far"
8. "Tagpuan"
9. "You Are My Song"
10. "Paano Kita Iibigin"
11. "Nobody Does It Better" / "For Your Eyes Only" / "Diamonds Are Forever"
12. "It Must Have Been Love"
13. "With One More Look At You" / "I'll Never Love Again"
14. "White Christmas"
15. "Two for the Road" / "Moment to Moment" / "Moon River"
16. "I Don't Want to Miss a Thing"

Encore

17. "Can't Stop the Feeling!"
Notes
- The 2001 set list is adapted from the television special that aired on RPN. (Note: Regine at the Movies (2001) was aired as a two-part television special on February 15 and 22, 2002 on RPN.)
- The 2018 set list is adapted from the pay-per-view live streaming that was broadcast on KBO. (Note: Regine at the Movies (2018) was broadcast via pay-per-view live streaming on November 24, 2018 on KBO.)
- At the November 17, 2018 concert, Velasquez and Piolo Pascual performed "Paano Kita Iibigin".
- At the November 24, 2018 concert, Velasquez and Sharon Cuneta performed a medley of "Bituing Walang Ningning" and "Pangarap na Bituin".
- At the November 25, 2018 concert, Velasquez and Daniel Padilla performed "Nothing's Gonna Stop Us Now".

== Shows ==
List of concerts, showing date, city, venue, and guest act
Date	City	Venue	Guest act
Leg 1
November 9, 2001	San Juan	Music Museum	Gabby Eigenmann
November 10, 2001	San Juan	Music Museum	Gabby Eigenmann
November 16, 2001	San Juan	Music Museum	Gabby Eigenmann
November 17, 2001	San Juan	Music Museum	Gabby Eigenmann
November 23, 2001	Makati	Onstage Theater	Gabby Eigenmann
November 24, 2001	Makati	Onstage Theater	Gabby Eigenmann
November 30, 2001	Makati	Onstage Theater	Gabby Eigenmann
December 1, 2001	Makati	Onstage Theater	Gabby Eigenmann
December 7, 2001	Makati	Onstage Theater	Gabby Eigenmann
December 8, 2001	Makati	Onstage Theater	Gabby Eigenmann
December 15, 2001	Makati	Onstage Theater	Gabby Eigenmann
December 16, 2001	Makati	Onstage Theater	Gabby Eigenmann
December 21, 2001	Makati	Onstage Theater	Gabby Eigenmann
December 22, 2001	Makati	Onstage Theater	Gabby Eigenmann
December 28, 2001	Makati	Onstage Theater	Gabby Eigenmann
December 29, 2001	Makati	Onstage Theater	Gabby Eigenmann
December 30, 2001	Makati	Onstage Theater	Gabby Eigenmann
Leg 2
November 17, 2018	Quezon	New Frontier Theater	Piolo Pascual
November 24, 2018	Quezon	New Frontier Theater	Sharon Cuneta
November 25, 2018	Quezon	New Frontier Theater	Daniel Padilla

== See also ==
- List of Regine Velasquez live performances
