= On the Wings of Love (song) =

1982 song by Jeffrey Osborne

Single by Jeffrey Osborne

from the album Jeffrey Osborne
- B-side: "I'm Beggin'"
- Released: September 1982; February 1983 (UK)
- Genre: Pop
- Length: 4:00
- Label: A&M
- Songwriters: Peter Schless, Jeffrey Osborne
- Producer: George Duke

Jeffrey Osborne singles chronology
"I Really Don't Need No Light" (1982)	"On the Wings of Love" (1982)	"Eenie Meenie" (1983)

Audio
- "On the Wings of Love" on YouTube

"On the Wings of Love" is a song by Jeffrey Osborne from his self-titled debut album released in 1982. Written alongside Peter Schless, the song was the second single from the album.

"On the Wings of Love" peaked at No. 29 on the U.S. Billboard Hot 100, No. 13 R&B, and No. 7 Adult Contemporary. It did well in the UK, where it reached No. 11. It also hit No. 1 on the Canadian Adult Contemporary chart.

The song became his biggest hit in the United Kingdom. Meanwhile in the United States, it was his biggest hit since the L.T.D. song "Back in Love Again", on which he was the lead singer.

== Personnel ==
- Jeffrey Osborne – lead vocals, vocal arrangements, rhythm arrangements, background vocals
- George Duke – rhythm arrangements, piano
- Michael Sembello – guitar
- Steve Ferrone – drums
- Abraham Laboriel, Sr. – bass

== Chart history ==
=== Weekly charts ===
Chart (1982–84)	Peak position
Australia (Kent Music Report)	36
Belgium (Flanders)	28
Canada RPM Adult Contemporary	1
Ireland (IRMA)	15
Netherlands (Single Top 100)	43
UK Singles (Official Charts Company)	11
US Billboard Hot 100	29
US Hot R&B/Hip-Hop Songs (Billboard)	13
US Adult Contemporary (Billboard)	7
US Cash Box Top 100	23

Year-end charts
Chart (1984)	Position
UK Singles (Gallup)	91

== Cover versions ==
- Regine Velasquez recorded a cover of the song for the album R2K.
- Kyla recorded a cover of the song as the main theme song for the television series On the Wings of Love in 2015.
