= Kailangan Ko'y Ikaw (soundtrack) =

- The Original Soundtrack of Kailangan Ko'y Ikaw

Soundtrack album by Various Artists/ Regine Velasquez
- Released: July 28, 2000
- Genre: Pop, OPM
- Language: English, Tagalog
- Label: Viva
- Producer: Vic del Rosario, Jr. (executive); Regine Velasquez-Alcasid; Raul Mitra

Regine Velasquez chronology
Unsolo (2000)	Kailangan Ko'y Ikaw (2000)	Regine Live: Songbird Sings the Classics (2000)

Singles from Kailangan Ko'y Ikaw
- 1. "Kailangan Ko'y Ikaw" Released: 2000; 2. "Tuwing Umuulan" Released: 2000

Kailangan Ko'y Ikaw is the soundtrack to the 2000 Viva Films comedy and romance film of the same name starring Regine Velasquez and Robin Padilla. The soundtrack was released by Viva Records on 2000 in CD and cassette format. With the film's immense success, the single "Kailangan Ko'y Ikaw" shot to the top of the charts and the soundtrack sold more than 240,000+ copies in the Philippines.

== Content ==
The carrier single is the song "Kailangan Ko'y Ikaw" composed by Ogie Alcasid which was requested by Regine Velasquez to be the main love theme of the film. The song was created for only a day by Alcasid during his then wife Michelle Van Eimeren's second child pregnancy. The album went gold certified by the Philippine Association of the Record Industry (PARI) after a week upon release and turned platinum award after a month and considered one of the best selling soundtracks by a Filipino movie in the Philippines.

== Accolades ==
The song Kailangan Ko'y Ikaw received numerous awards and citation from different Philippine awards program including Awit Awards, Filipino Academy of Movie Arts & Sciences (FAMAS) Awards and PMPC Star Awards for Movies.

Year	Award	Category
2001	23rd Awit Awards	Best Performance By A Female Recording Artist
2001	23rd Awit Awards	Best Ballad Recording
2001	23rd Awit Awards	Best Movie/ TV/ Stage Theme Song Recording
2001	23rd Awit Awards	Song of the Year
2001	17th PMPC Star Awards for Movies	Movie Theme Song of the Year
2001	49th FAMAS Awards	Best Movie Theme Song

== Track listing ==
Kailangan Ko'y Ikaw (The Original Soundtrack)
No.	Title	Writer(s)	Performer(s)	Length
1.	"Kailangan Ko'y Ikaw"	Ogie Alcasid	Regine Velasquez	3:22
2.	"Star on a TV Show"	Hugo Peretti; Luigi Creatore; George David Weiss	Cacai Velasquez-Mitra	3:35
3.	"The First Time Ever I Saw Your Face"	Ewan MacColl	Regine Velasquez	4:28
4.	"Suntok Sa Buwan"	Danny Javier	Ely Buendia	3:03
5.	"Tuwing Umuulan (duet version)"	Ryan Cayabyab	Regine Velasquez; Robin Padilla	5:00
6.	"Giliw"	Jim Paredes	Regine Velasquez	3:12
7.	"Everyday^{[a]}"	Cacai Velasquez-Mitra	Regine Velasquez	4:23
8.	"The Best That I Can Be (She Loves Me)"	Jim Photoglo; Brian Francis Neary	Gabby Eigenmann	3:22
9.	"Tuwing Umuulan (solo version)"	Ryan Cayabyab	Regine Velasquez	5:00
10.	"Sabihin Mo Lang"	Trina Belamide	Regine Velasquez	3:52
11.	"My Heart Still Wishes For You"	Lisa Dy; Chat Zamora	Regine Velasquez	4:18
12.	"Kaligayahan"	Trina Belamide	Regine Velasquez	4:11
13.	"Kailangan Ko'y Ikaw (Main Theme)^{[b]}"	Ogie Alcasid	Regine Velasquez	4:10

Notes

- ^{^a}features uncredited vocals from Raul Mitra.
- ^{^b}the "Main Theme" is the film version which features the Manila Philharmonic Orchestra.

Cover credits

- "Star on a TV Show" is a cover originally from The Stylistics, from their 1974 album Heavy.
- "The First Time Ever I Saw Your Face" is a cover originally from Roberta Flack, from her 1969 album First Take.
- "Suntok Sa Buwan" is a cover originally from APO Hiking Society, from their 1993 album Barangay Apo.
- "Tuwing Umuulan" is a Ryan Cayabyab original, first popularized by Basil Valdez from his 1978 album, Basil.
- "The Best That I Can Be (She Loves Me)" is a Jim Photoglo original, first popularized by James Ingram from his 1983 album, It's Your Night.

== Personnel ==
The album was produced by Regine Velasquez and Raul Mitra.

- Regine Velasquez – vocals, background vocals
- Trina Belamide – background vocals
- Sonny Azurin – bass
- Roger Herrera – bass
- Marc Lopez – arranger
- Raul Mitra – arranger, vocals
- Eric Apuyan – engineer, mixing
- Eric Payumo – engineer
- Percival Fontanilla – A&R
- Ewan MacColl – composer
- Van Sean Deato – cover design

== Certifications ==
Country	Provider	Certification	Sales
Philippines	PARI	6× Platinum	240,000+

== See also ==
- Regine Velasquez discography
- List of best-selling albums in the Philippines
