= Lenka discography =

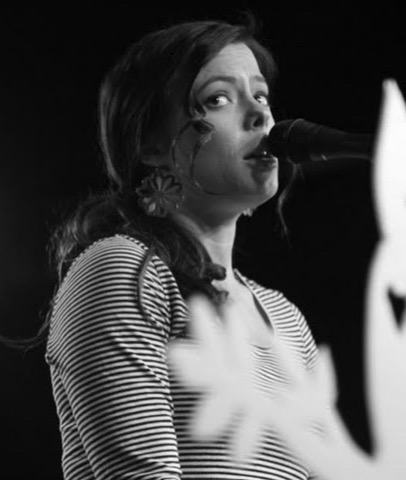
- Lenka performing in 2009
- Studio albums: 6
- EPs: 3
- Compilation albums: 1
- Singles: 16

The discography of Lenka Kripac, best known as simply Lenka, a singer-songwriter from New South Wales, Australia, consists of 6 studio albums, 3 extended plays, and 16 singles. This list does not include material released by Decoder Ring, a band in which Lenka was a member before pursuing a solo career.

Lenka released her debut self-titled album in 2008. The album's lead single, and Kripac's debut single, was titled "The Show" and remains her most successful single to date. Her second album, Two, was released over two years later in 2011, but failed to gain the same commercial success as the singer's debut album, due to a string of unsuccessful singles. In November 2012, "Everything at Once" was released as Two's third and final single after being sampled in a Windows 8 advertisement, and became Lenka's second most successful single to date. Her third studio album, Shadows, was released in June 2013. On 10 March 2015, she released the lead single "Blue Skies" from her new album, The Bright Side, released on 29 May in Germany. On 13 October 2017, she released her fifth album Attune, and over five years later, she released her sixth studio album Intraspectral.

== Albums ==
=== Studio albums ===
Title	Details	Peak chart positions							Certifications
Title	Details	AUT	GER	POL	KOR	SWI	UK	US	Certifications
Lenka	Released: 23 September 2008; Label: Epic	30	35	4	— (Note: "Lenka" did not enter the Circle Albums Chart, but peaked at number 98 on the Circle International Albums Chart.)	48	58	142	POL: Gold
Two	Released: 19 April 2011; Label: Epic	—	—	88	26	—	—	196	
Shadows	Released: 4 June 2013; Label: Skipalong	—	—	—	21	—	—	—	
The Bright Side	Released: 16 June 2015; Label: Skipalong	—	—	—	18	—	—	—	
Attune	Released: 13 October 2017; Label: Skipalong	—	—	—	— (Note: "Attune" did not enter the Gaon Albums Chart, but peaked at number 12 on the Gaon International Albums Chart.)	—	—	—	
Intraspectral	Released: 17 November 2023; Label: Skipalong	—	—	—	—	—	—	—	
Good Days	Released: 29 May 2026; Label: Skipalong	—	—	—	—	—	—	—	
"—" denotes a recording that did not chart or was not released in that territory

=== Compilation albums ===
Title	Details
Recover/Discover	Released: 21 November 2020; Label: Skipalong

== Extended plays ==
Title	Details
Live 2008	Released: 24 March 2009; Label: Epic
Recover	Released: 14 February 2020; Label: Skipalong
Discover	Released: 28 February 2020; Label: Skipalong

== Singles ==
Title	Year	Peak chart positions										Certifications	Album
Title	Year	AUS	AUT	BEL (FL)	CAN	GER	IRE	NED	NOR	SWI	UK	Certifications	Album
"The Show"	2008	65	13	54	—	23	—	—	—	21	22		Lenka
"Trouble Is a Friend"	2009	—	—	—	—	65	—	—	10	—	—		Lenka
"Heart Skips a Beat"	2011	—	—	53	—	—	—	—	—	—	—		Two
"Two"	2011	—	—	—	—	—	—	—	—	—	—		Two
"Everything at Once"	2012	—	24	8	69	18	63	27	—	53	69	BVMI: Gold	Two
"Heart to the Party"	2013	—	—	—	—	—	—	—	—	—	—		Shadows
"Nothing Here but Love"	2013	—	—	—	—	—	—	—	—	—	—		Shadows
"Blue Skies"	2015	—	—	—	—	—	—	—	—	—	—		The Bright Side
"Heal"	2017	—	—	—	—	—	—	—	—	—	—		Attune
"We Belong"	2019	—	—	—	—	—	—	—	—	—	—		Recover
"On My Side"	2019	—	—	—	—	—	—	—	—	—	—		Discover
"What Goes Up"	2020	—	—	—	—	—	—	—	—	—	—		Discover
"Season for Love" (with Silence Wang)	2021	—	—	—	—	—	—	—	—	—	—		Non-album singles
"Ivory Tower"	2021	—	—	—	—	—	—	—	—	—	—		Non-album singles
"Winter Sun"	2022	—	—	—	—	—	—	—	—	—	—		Non-album singles
"Stop Thinking So Much"	2022	—	—	—	—	—	—	—	—	—	—		Non-album singles
"One Moment"	2023	—	—	—	—	—	—	—	—	—	—		Intraspectral
"Silhouette"	2023	—	—	—	—	—	—	—	—	—	—		Intraspectral
"Champion" (featuring Josh Pyke)	2023	—	—	—	—	—	—	—	—	—	—		Intraspectral
"Magenta" (with Lexie Liu)	2025	—	—	—	—	—	—	—	—	—	—		Non-album single
"Sunshine Girl"	2026	—	—	—	—	—	—	—	—	—	—		Good Days
"Good Days"	2026	—	—	—	—	—	—	—	—	—	—		Good Days
"The Balance"	2026	—	—	—	—	—	—	—	—	—	—		Good Days
"—" denotes a recording that did not chart or was not released in that territory.

== Guest appearances ==
List of non-single guest appearances, with other performing artists, showing year released and album name
Title	Year	Other artist(s)	Album
"Panic Room"	2005	Paul Mac	Panic Room
"Addicted"	2010	Schiller	Atemlos
"Sunrise"	2010	Schiller	Atemlos
"Golden Moment"	2017	Transmission Project	Golden Moment – Single

== Footnotes ==
Notes for peak chart positions
