= Shadows (Lenka album) =

Studio album by Lenka
- Released: 2 June 2013
- Genres: Orchestral pop; indie-pop
- Length: 41:13
- Label: Skipalong
- Producers: Lenka; Tom Schutzinger; John O'Mahony; Pierre Marchand; Kevin Salem; Tawgs Salter

Lenka chronology
Two (2011)	Shadows (2013)	The Bright Side (2015)

Singles from Shadows
- 1. "Heart to the Party" Released: 8 May 2013; 2. "Nothing Here but Love" Released: 7 June 2013

Shadows is the third studio album by the Australian recording artist Lenka, released on 2 June 2013 by Skipalong Records. Recorded while she was pregnant with her first child, the album marked a stylistic shift from her earlier releases toward a softer indie-pop and orchestral pop record with a distinctly vintage character. According to Lenka, the project was inspired by nursery rhymes and lullabies conceived for adult audiences, which represents a departure from her previous style.

The album was preceded by the lead single "Heart to the Party", followed by "Nothing Here but Love", both of which received accompanying music videos. Lenka promoted Shadows through live performances, including a virtual concert on Stageit and a show at Den Atelier in Luxembourg. Upon release, the album reached number 22 on the Billboard Heatseekers Albums chart.

== Background and recording ==
Lenka initially had no intention of pursuing a career in the United States and had expected her visit to be brief. However, she relocated to California, where members of the music industry responded positively to her material and publishers encouraged her to record demonstration tracks. While performing in small venues at the Hotel Café in Los Angeles, she became acquainted with a community of local songwriters and began collaborating with them. She later signed with Epic Records and released her first two solo albums, Lenka (2008) and Two (2011). Her music was featured in television series including Grey's Anatomy, Ugly Betty and 90210, including that her 2012 single "Everything at Once" was used prominently in a commercial campaign for Windows 8.

=== Theme ===
It's supposed to be an album of nursery rhymes or lullabys, but for adults as well. I love the power of music that is subtle, that you can fall asleep to. And now that I've got a child and I'm married, there's different things that matter now. You care about other people, and I think that really came through in the music.

— Lenka, talking about the album's theme

Lenka characterised Shadows as being inspired by the form of "nursery rhymes and lullabies", though conceived with adult audiences in mind. She further emphasised her fondness for understated music and "the power of music that is subtle, that you can fall asleep to". She also stated that the album "was a departure from [her] normal style" and that she intentionally sought a different atmosphere for the project. She explained that she "would never stick with that mood", describing the period as "a sort of nesting cocoon moment".

In an interview with The Jakarta Post, Lenka downplayed commercial ambition, stating, "I'm not looking for some huge success; I don't want to be the king of the world." She described Shadows as being centred instead on "beautiful music and connecting with my fans", adding that she hoped her songs might "enter into their dreams". The album was recorded while Lenka was pregnant with her first child, Quinn. He inspired the most part of the album; "After the Winter" and "Two Heartbeats" were composed from his perspective prior to birth, with their tempo structured around the sound of his recorded heartbeat.

== Composition ==
=== Overview ===
Shadows is an indie-pop album which centres on a richly arranged orchestral pop sound with a distinctly vintage character, built around fluid melodies. In a telephone interview from Los Angeles, Lenka described the album as having "a lullaby quality", characterised by "quiet, dreamy songs" and "folky instrumentation" incorporating strings, bells and acoustic guitars. According to Matt Collar from AllMusic, the record represents a stylistic development from her earlier, more effervescent pop releases. Her previous works, he suggested, nodded towards 1960s singer-songwriter pop and contemporary indie acts such as Owl City and Lights, whereas Shadows adopts a broader, psychedelic-tinged palette reminiscent of Donovan, Nick Drake and Serge Gainsbourg.

=== Songs ===
"Two Hearbeats"
"Two Heartbeats" features heartbeat sounds of Lenka's baby.

The album opens with "Nothing Here but Love", a mid-tempo track originally recorded during a 2008 session with Canadian producer Pierre Marchand. According to The Seattle Times, the song features the singer's "whispery, almost childlike vocals". On the following track, "Faster with You", Lenka reflects on separation from her "other half", pairing lyrics about longing with "airy percussion" and a melody reminiscent of a music box. Writing for Glamour, Mickey Woods described the lead single "Heart to the Party" as unfolding at "the pace of a dreamy waltz", noting that Lenka's "winsome vocals" lend the track a "childlike quality". National Post's Rebecca Melnyk described "After the Winter" as built around a peaceful melody. The song was noted for revisiting themes of renewal and perseverance, with lyrics such as "when the trees have lost the colour, and the sky is full of fears" presented in a restrained style that allows listeners "space to feel a range of emotions". Both songs incorporate a carefully layered arrangement combining strings, brass, guitars and Wurlitzer keyboards, alongside a range of percussion instruments such as vibraphone and glockenspiel. Collar noted that "Two Heartbeats" is structured around "the whooshing in utero heartbeat of her baby". The closing track, "The Top of Memory Lane", is a ballad that reconnects with someone from one's past and the desire "to fall a little more into what we learned before", according to Chanun Poomsawai of Bangkok Post.

== Promotion ==
Shadows' lead single, "Heart to the Party", was released on 8 May 2013. Its music video, inspired by her first baby, was released a day later in Lenka's Vevo, and it was re-released on her YouTube channel three days later. "Nothing Here but Love" served as the album's second single on 7 June. She released its music video two weeks later. On 23 October, the music video for "After the Winter" was premiered. To support the album, Lenka held a virtual concert ar Stageit on April, performing from her backyard in Sydney. In August, she performed the concert at Den Atelier in Luxembourg.

== Critical reception ==
Professional ratings
Review scores
Source	Rating
AllMusic	4/5 stars

AllMusic's Matt Collar described Shadows as "a work of rapturous, ceaselessly melodic, vintage-sounding orchestral pop" that showcases Lenka's "elfin croon". He ultimately called the album "a tiny masterpiece". Chad Gorn of MXDWN acknowledged her initial breakout with "The Show" (2008) and her continued indie credibility. However, he felt that Shadows lacked the engaging energy of her past work. Writing for the Bangkok Post, Chanun Poomsawai observed that the album "boldly trades" the singer's "signature delight in introspective sentimentality", which he felt could come across as "too unvaried" at times. He noted that much of the album centres on sparse arrangements featuring percussion or soft piano, and suggested that while the restraint can be appealing, an excess may "bring on ennui". The Seattle Times' staff writer suggested that Shadows may particularly resonate with couples navigating the transformative experience of parenthood, writing that it "could become a favorite" in that context. They also highlighted that its "calming melodies and universal themes" may also resonate with a broader audience.

== Track listing ==
All tracks are written by Lenka Kripac, except where noted.

Standard edition
No.	Title	Writer(s)	Length
1.	"Nothing Here but Love"	Lenka Kripac; Thomas "Tawgs" Salter	3:30
2.	"Faster with You"	Kripac; Zac Rae	3:42
3.	"Heart to the Party"	Kripac; Tom Schutzinger	3:05
4.	"After the Winter"	Kripac; Paul Herman	3:32
5.	"Find a Way to You"		3:46
6.	"Honeybee"	Kripac; Jason Reeves	4:19
7.	"No Harm Tonight"		4:12
8.	"Two Heartbeats"		4:05
9.	"Monsters"		2:28
10.	"Nothing"	Kripac; Kevin Salem	4:23
11.	"The Top of Memory Lane"		4:12
Total length:			41:13

== Personnel ==
Credits were adapted from AllMusic.

- Lenka – vocals (all tracks), glockenspiel, instrumentation, keyboards, organ, piano, producer, synthesizer, vibraphone, wurlitzer
- Tracy Bonham – violin
- Gavin Brown – vocals
- Greg Calbi – mastering
- Lenny DeRose – engineer
- Jonathan Dreyfus – violin
- Jean Philippe Goncalves – bass guitar
- Graham Finn – guitars
- James Gulliver Hancock – artwork
- Zoe Hauptmann – bass guitar
- Paul Herman – composer
- Danny Levin – horn, horn engineer
- Pierre Marchand – producer
- Rich Mercurio – drums
- Francois Plante – vocals
- Zac Rae – composer, drums
- Jason Reeves – composer, background vocals
- Maxime St. Pierre – flugelhorn
- Kevin Salem – bass guitar, composer, engineer, guitar, keyboards, noise, percussion, producer, programming
- Thomas "Tawgs" Salter – composer, instrumentation, producer
- Tom Schutzinger – bass guitar, composer, drums, engineer, guitars, keyboards, percussion, producer, strings
- Pascal Shefteshy – engineer, acoustic guitar
- Doug Yowell – drums

== Charts ==
Weekly chart performance
Chart (2013)	Peak position
South Korean Albums (Circle)	21
US Heatseekers Albums (Billboard)	22

== Release history ==
List of release dates and formats
Region	Date	Format	Label	Ref.
Various	2 June 2013	CD; digital download; LP; streaming	Skipalong	
