= Selos (song) =

Single by Shaira
- Released: November 28, 2023; April 11, 2024 (re-released)
- Recorded: 2023
- Genre: Electronic dance music
- Length: 3:33
- Label: AHS Productions
- Songwriters: Krishna Ares Glang; Lenka Kripac; Thomas Salter
- Producer: Krishna Ares Glang

Shaira singles chronology
"Natibpad (Lalakeng Abusado)" (2023)	"Selos" (2023)	"Ikaw Lamang (BabyCakes Ko)" (2023)

Original Cover
- Single cover of "Selos" when it was first released in 2023

Music video
- "Selos" on YouTube

"Selos" (lit. 'Jealous') is a song by Filipino singer Shaira. It was released in 2023 and became a popular hit, particularly on social media platforms like TikTok. The song is an anthem about jealousy and heartbreak.

"Selos" is essentially a cover of the song "Trouble Is a Friend" by Lenka, an indie pop song released in 2009. On March 19, 2024, "Selos" was removed from music streaming services such as Spotify and Apple Music because it was deemed to infringe on copyright of the original song; the song was soon reinstated when AHS Productions came to an agreement with Lenka's camp to secure legal permission for the song.

== Background and composition ==
The core melody and musical structure of "Selos" are based on "Trouble Is a Friend". However, the lyrics of the two songs follow two different subject matters; "Selos" centers on heartbreak and jealousy while the original song has trouble as its central theme.

Krishna Ares Glang, who is also known as AG, wrote the lyrics for the song. AG has admitted the song is a remake of Lenka's song. The lyrics were inspired from AG's own experience of heartbreak and being jealous of seeing his romantic interest with another person.

== Reception ==
"Selos" became a viral trend on TikTok, with users creating their own dance covers and lip-sync videos to the song. A music video on YouTube was also released in late 2023 by Shaira with the disclaimer that it was made for "parody and entertainment purposes". The video garnered more than nine million views. The song's popularity helped to raise Shaira's profile and introduce Bangsamoro pop to a wider audience. "Selos" peaked at number one on Spotify's chart for viral hits.

== Controversy ==
Lenka, the musician who performed "Trouble Is a Friend", the song "Selos" is based on, took action against the publication of the song due to copyright issues.

In response, AHS Productions on March 19, 2024, voluntarily removed "Selos" from all streaming platforms as they worked towards securing a cover license for its use. The decision was made to ensure compliance with legal requirements and respect for the original artist's rights.

AHS Productions issued an official statement apologizing to fans who enjoyed "Selos" and expressing gratitude for their support. They acknowledged the unexpected success of the song and thanked listeners for embracing Shaira's cover rendition. The statement also conveyed the production team's pride in Shaira's newfound recognition as a prominent figure in Bangsamoro pop music. Three more songs would be removed from streaming platforms allegedly due to their melodies being copied from Indonesian songs.

On April 11, 2024, "Selos" was re-released after Shaira's team reached an agreement with Lenka's camp.

== Track listing ==
Digital download
No.	Title	Length
1.	"Selos"	3:33
