= Freedom (concert) =

2021 concert by Regine Velasquez

- Livestream concert by Regine Velasquez
- Promotional poster for the show
- Location: Worldwide
- Venue: ABS-CBN Studios (Manila)
- Date: February 28, 2021
- Duration: 120 minutes
- No. of shows: 1
- Guests: Bamboo Mañalac
- Producers: ABS-CBN Events

Regine Velasquez concert chronology
- Unified (2020); Freedom: The Regine Velasquez-Alcasid Digital Concert (2021); Solo (2023)

Freedom: The Regine Velasquez-Alcasid Digital Concert was a livestream concert by the Filipino recording artist Regine Velasquez. The concert was produced and broadcast by ABS-CBN Events through four live streaming platforms at 8:00 p.m. Philippine Standard Time on February 28, 2021. The concert's premise was "freedom of singing", stemming from Velasquez's desire to sing songs from several music genres and create a live experience on a stream for her fans longing for a sense of human connection. The set list included renditions of songs from artists such as Elton John, Chris Isaak, George Michael, Sara Bareilles, Dua Lipa, and Billie Eilish. Bamboo Mañalac performed as a special guest.

Freedom was filmed at ABS-CBN Studios in Manila, with musicians, background vocalists, and dancers on set. Initially scheduled for Valentine's Day, Freedom was postponed due to potential COVID-19 exposure among the production team, in line with strict quarantine guidelines affecting the city. The concert received positive reviews, praise centering on Velasquez's stage presence and performance. Commercially, ticket sales exceeded ₱1 million (US$20,000) within twelve hours after they were made available for purchase. There was a reshowing of the livestream, broadcast exclusively via Stageit on April 4, 2021.

== Background and development ==
The development of Freedom began after Regine Velasquez curated online benefit concerts in support of relief efforts during the COVID-19 pandemic. She performed One Night with Regine to benefit the Bantay Bata Foundation's COVID-19 response fund in April 2020. Two months later, she collaborated with Jollibee Foods Corporation on Regine: Joy From Home, which raised money in support of the brand's food aid program.

Freedom was officially announced on December 15, 2020, through ABS-CBNnews.com and Velasquez's social media accounts. A co-production between ABS-CBN Events and iMusic Entertainment, the show was scheduled to be livestreamed on February 14, 2021, via the web-based platform KTX. The promotional poster depicted a portrait of Velasquez's head shot in grayscale. Tickets for Freedom went on sale worldwide on January 8, 2021, for ₱1,200; VIP tickets were priced at ₱2,500. KTX reported that ticket sales grossed ₱500,000 within ten minutes of availability; all VIP tickets sold out after twelve hours, by which time the gross had exceeded ₱1 million (US$20,000). Additional VIP tickets were sold because of high demand.

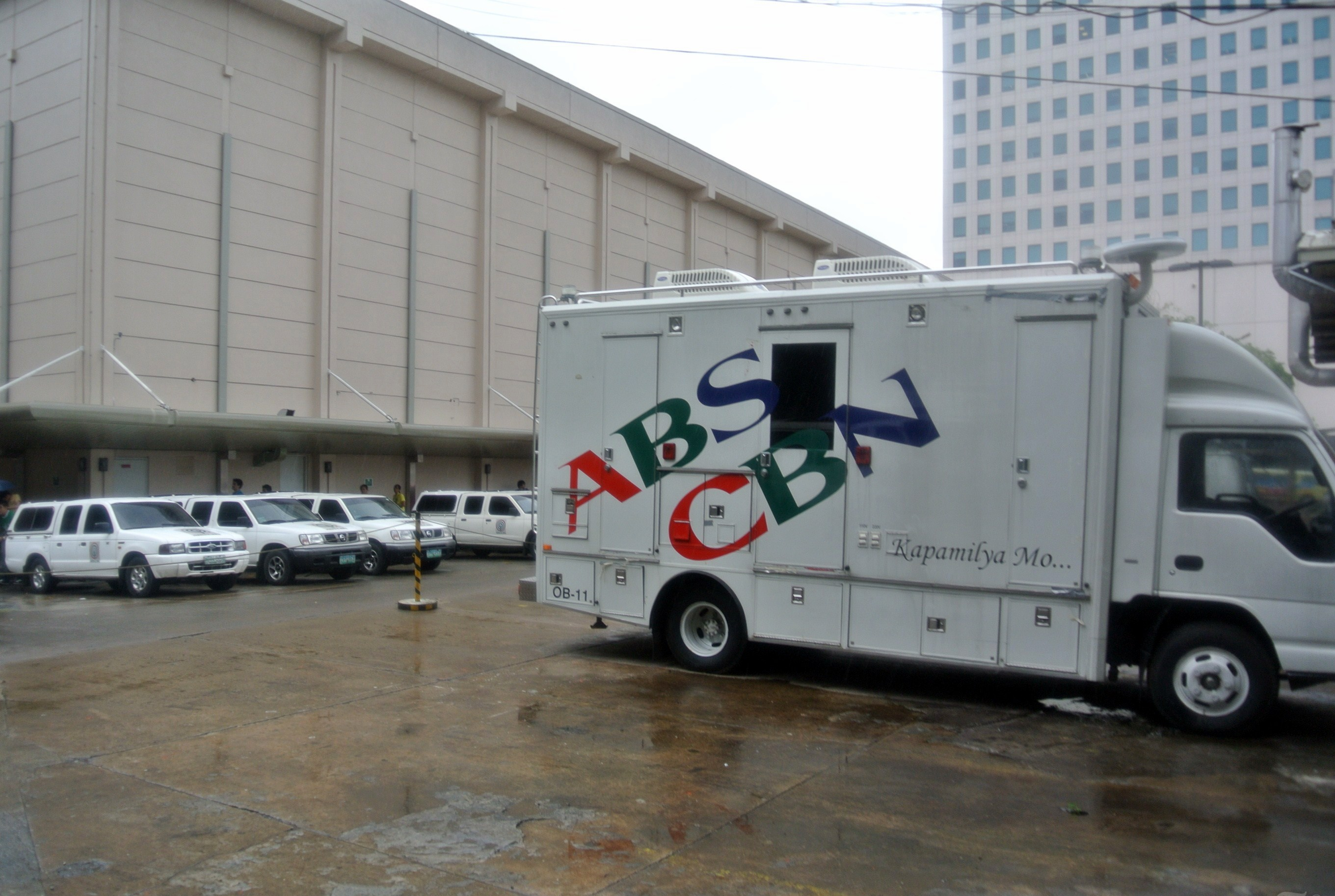
The ABS-CBN Studios in Manila, where the concert was filmed

Velasquez stated that the concert's name and concept were based on her desire to have "freedom of singing" anything she wanted, seeking to perform new material from several music genres and viewing it as an opportunity to challenge herself. With Freedom, Velasquez wielded more creative control, heavily involved in its planning and production, and she claimed the project fueled her artistic growth and maturity. Velasquez took her fans into consideration; she, like them, had wished for a sense of connection and freedom in light of pandemic lockdown protocols. Her main objective was to perform the songs with "an exciting twist", though she felt pressure with continuing to surprise her audience with her showmanship because they had set the bar high for her.

Freedom was filmed at ABS-CBN Studios in Manila using a full concert set-up, with live musicians, background vocalists, and dancers. The Philippine Star reported the show had a total of 20 production numbers and a running time of two hours, writing that it was one of the singer's "biggest online concerts". Raul Mitra was the music director, and Paolo Valenciano was the stage director.

On February 9, 2021, Velasquez and her team announced through social media that Freedom was postponed due to potential COVID-19 exposure within the production team. As a precaution to prevent any unexpected circumstances, she underwent self-quarantine following guidance on isolation and social restrictions that affected Manila. Five days later, after Velasquez tested negative for COVID-19, the concert was rescheduled to February 28 at 8:00 p.m. Philippine Standard Time (PST). The show was broadcast on additional platforms via iWantTFC, TFC IPTV, and Sky Pay-per-view. Freedom was made available to stream again on Stageit at 10:00 a.m. PST on April 4, 2021.

== Concert synopsis ==
The concert was divided into four acts and opened with a short video introduction narrated by Velasquez. Its set featured a large LED screen as a backdrop and geometric structures of birds hanging from the ceiling. Velasquez, in a red dress with a long cape, made her way to an elevated platform to perform George Michael's "Freedom!" (1990). She descended the podium and went straight into her rendition of "Brave" (2013) by Sara Bareilles, accompanied by female dancers performing a lyrical dance routine. The singer continued into a slower number, an a capella cover of Billie Eilish's "When the Party's Over" (2018), before transitioning into Chris Isaak's "Wicked Game" (1989). The next song was an English, stripped-down version of K-pop group Twice's 2017 single "Heart Shaker". For "Goodbye Yellow Brick Road" (1973) by Elton John, she performed with piano accompaniment from Mitra.

In the second act, Velasquez changed into a black lace bodysuit and performed Dua Lipa's "Levitating" (2020) while doing a choreography with her dancers. She put on a long coat for her own songs "Bukas Sana" (2001) and "Tanging Mahal" (2001); the Juans's "Istorya" (2017) and Ben&Ben's "Leaves" (2017), two songs from Filipino bands, were also part of the set list. To begin the third act, Bamboo Mañalac went onstage for a performance of his 2004 single "Masaya", before Velasquez, in a white silk suit, joined him for a duet of "Himala" (1996). Shortly after was Velasquez's cover of Adele's "Rolling in the Deep" (2010), which interpolated "In the End" (2001) by Linkin Park. Then, Velasquez spoke briefly about the 2021 documentary film Framing Britney Spears, which she watched while under quarantine, and hoped Spears could eventually achieve freedom from her conservatorship. To honor her, Velasquez sang "...Baby One More Time", Spears's 1998 debut single. She ended the segment with a duet with a holographic version of herself, performing "On the Wings of Love" (1982).

For the final act, Velasquez donned a yellow off-the-shoulder dress and began with Bob Dylan's "Make You Feel My Love" (1997) and Madonna's "Crazy for You" (1985), which she dedicated to her son and husband. Patti Austin's "I Will Remember You" (1991) was performed for an in memoriam segment that paid tribute to individuals in the Philippine entertainment industry, including those who had died from COVID-19. Velasquez, joined by her female dancers, performed a medley of songs that had gone viral on the online video platform TikTok. Freedom closed with an encore performance of Tears for Fears's "Mad World" (1982). VIP-ticket holders got to attend a virtual meet-and-greet and after party, apart from witnessing behind the scenes footage from Freedom's rehearsals.

== Critical reception ==
Freedom was met with positive reviews from critics. A review by the Philippine Entertainment Portal argued the show's production and vocal performances were benchmarks against which other Philippine online concerts could be measured. It wrote that Velasquez was "in her element" as she performed unforgettable and appealing songs one after another. In Rappler, Bea Cupin called the show "surprisingly intimate and edgy", praising Velasquez's relaxed demeanor and humor in spite of the virtual setting and lack of a large crowd: "If it was awkward at all for the singer, whose career has been defined by sold-out shows, to be surrounded only by her team, that certainly didn't show." Cupin concluded, "The music icon outdoes herself with an online concert that fans both old and new are sure to remember for years to come." A music critic from the Manila Standard remarked on the show's "intimate yet explosive live performance", making reference to her covers of "When the Party Is Over", "Baby One More Time", and "Goodbye Yellow Brick Road" that "bared Regine's beautiful range and exceptional artistry".

== Set list ==
This set list is adapted from ABS-CBNnews.com, and from the streaming concert itself.

1. "Freedom!"
2. "Brave"
3. "When the Party's Over"
4. "Wicked Game"
5. "Heart Shaker"
6. "Goodbye Yellow Brick Road"
7. "Levitating"
8. "Bukas Sana"
9. "Tanging Mahal"
10. "Istorya"
11. "Leaves"
12. "Masaya" / "Himala" (with Bamboo Mañalac)
13. "Rolling in the Deep" / "In the End"
14. "...Baby One More Time"
15. "On the Wings of Love"
16. "Make You Feel My Love"
17. "Crazy for You"
18. "I Will Remember You"
19. "Upside Down" / "All I Want" / "Mad at Disney"

Encore

20. "Mad World"

== See also ==
- List of Regine Velasquez live performances
