= Two (Lenka album) =

Studio album by Lenka
- Released: 28 February 2011
- Studio: Modern Dirt (London); Distortion Tank (Woodstock, NY); Frou Frou East (London); Maze (Atlanta, GA); Mushroom Stamp (Culver City, CA); Konk (London); Muttley Ranch (London); PapPap's Palace (Culver City, CA)
- Genre: Pop
- Length: 38:55
- Label: Epic
- Producer: Eg White; Guy Sigsworth; David Kosten

Lenka chronology
| Lenka (2008) | Two (2011) | Shadows (2013) |

Singles from Two
- 1. "Heart Skips a Beat" Released: 11 February 2011; 2. "Two" Released: 30 June 2011; 3. "Everything at Once" Released: 4 November 2012

Two is the second studio album by Australian recording artist Lenka. It was released on 28 February 2011 in Singapore through Epic Records.

The album was Lenka's second solo album after having been a member of the group Decoder Ring. The first single from the album, "Heart Skips a Beat", was released on 11 February 2011 to little commercial success. Because of this lack of success, Two failed to chart as well as its predecessor, Lenka (2008).

== Singles and promotional singles ==
"Heart Skips a Beat" was the lead single of Two; it was released on the 11 February 2011. A music video for the song was revealed on 17 March, through Vevo. The album's title track, "Two", served as the second single. Its music video was premiered on 30 June on YouTube. "Roll with the Punches" was released on 8 November 2010, as the first promotional single of the album. "Everything at Once" was released as the second promotional single through iTunes Store. Lenka performed the song on Jimmy Kimmel Live! along with "Heart Skips a Beat". It was used in a TV advertisement for Windows 8 in 2012, leading to its release as the third single on 4 November 2012. "Everything at Once" was a commercial success, being Lenka's second most successful single after her 2008 single, "The Show".

== Critical reception ==
Professional ratings
Review scores
| Source | Rating |
|---|---|
| AllMusic | 4/5 stars |
| Oklahoma Gazette | positive |

Two was well received by most critics, earning 4 stars out of 5 from AllMusic. AllMusic described the album as maintaining Lenka's bright and melodic style while incorporating a more modern sound, shifting from orchestral arrangements to a minimalistic approach with some electro-pop elements. The review highlighted tracks like "Roll with the Punches" for its sing-song style and "Two" for its rhythmic, stripped-down production.

== Track listing ==
Standard edition
| No. | Title | Writer(s) | Producer(s) | Length |
|---|---|---|---|---|
| 1. | "Two" | Eg White; Lenka Kripac | White; Kevin Salem | 3:16 |
| 2. | "Heart Skips a Beat" | Kripac | Guy Sigsworth | 3:21 |
| 3. | "Roll with the Punches" | Ben H. Allen; Kripac | Ben H. Allen | 3:19 |
| 4. | "Sad Song" | Kripac | David Kosten | 3:25 |
| 5. | "Everything at Once" | Kripac | Kosten | 2:37 |
| 6. | "Blinded by Love" | Kripac | Kosten | 3:50 |
| 7. | "Here to Stay" | White; Kripac | White; Kevin Salem | 4:02 |
| 8. | "You Will Be Mine" | Sigsworth; Kripac | Sigsworth | 3:28 |
| 9. | "Shock Me into Love" | Sigsworth; Kripac | Sigsworth | 3:26 |
| 10. | "Everything's OK" | Kripac | Sunny Levine | 3:50 |
| 11. | "The End of the World" | Kripac | Sunny Levine | 4:14 |
| Total length: | | | | 38:55 |

Expanded edition
| No. | Title | Writer(s) | Length |
|---|---|---|---|
| 12. | "Maybe I Love You" | Lenka Kripac | 3:27 |
| 13. | "Wrote Me Out" | Hunter Burgan; Kripac | 4:24 |
| 14. | "All My Bells Are Ringing" | | 2:33 |
| 15. | "Pull Me Apart" | | 3:18 |
| 16. | "Deep Blue" | | 3:52 |
| Total length: | | | 56:39 |

== Personnel ==
Credits were adapted from the liner notes and AllMusic.

=== Recording locations ===
- Modern Dirt Studios; London (1, 7)
- Distortion Tank Studios; Woodstock, NY (1, 7)
- Frou Frou East; London (2, 8–9)
- Maze Studios; Atlanta, GA (3)
- Mushroom Stamp; Culver City, CA (3)
- Konk Studios; London (4–6)
- Muttley Ranch Studios; London (4–6)
- PapPap's Palace; Culver City, CA (10–11)

=== Personnel ===
- Lenka – vocals, autoharp, Fender Rhodes, keyboards, Mellotron, organ, percussion, piano, synthesizer
- Ben H. Allen – mixing, piano, production (3)
- Ian Archer – guitar
- Guy Aroch – photography
- Adam Ayan – mastering
- Sigurdur Birkis – drums
- Lukas Burton – A&R
- Jason Cooper – drums
- Danny T. Levin – horn
- Samuel Dixon – bass guitar
- Mike DuClos – bass
- Chris Elms – engineer, guitar, mixing, programming
- Rob Gardner – engineer
- James Gulliver Hancock – artwork, design
- Robby Handley – bass guitar
- Joe Hegleman – management
- Danny Kalb – mixing
- Erik Kertes – bass guitar
- David Kosten – engineer, keyboards, mixing, percussion, production (4–7), programming
- Sunny Levine – drums, engineer, production (10–11), programming
- Dougal Lott – engineer
- Andy Page – engineer, guitar, mixing, programming
- Eamon Ryland – guitar, Mellotron, pedal steel
- Kevin Salem – additional production (7), bass, engineer, guitar, mixing
- Ron Shapiro – management
- Guy Sigsworth – keyboards, production (8–9), strings
- Eg White – drums, engineer, guitar, keyboards, producer
- David Wrench – engineer
- Amir Yaghmai – guitar, violin

== Charts ==
List of chart performance
| Chart (2011) | Peak position |
|---|---|
| Belgian Albums (Ultratop Flanders) | 132 |
| Belgian Albums (Ultratop Wallonia) | 69 |
| South Korean Albums (Circle) | 26 |
| South Korean International Albums (Circle) | 2 |
| Swiss Albums (Schweizer Hitparade) | 88 |
| US Billboard 200 | 196 |
| US Top Heatseekers (Billboard) | 5 |

== Release history ==
Release dates and formats
| Region | Date | Format(s) | Label | Ref. |
|---|---|---|---|---|
| Singapore | 28 February 2011 | Digital download; streaming | Epic | |
| United States | 19 April 2011 | CD; digital download; streaming | Epic | |
