= The Bright Side (Lenka album) =

Studio album by Lenka
- Released: 16 June 2015
- Genre: Pop
- Length: 35:37
- Labels: Sony; Hickory; Skipalong
- Producer: Lenka

Lenka chronology
Shadows (2013)	The Bright Side (2015)	Attune (2017)

Singles from The Bright Side
- 1. "Blue Skies" Released: 4 March 2015

The Bright Side is the fourth studio album by Australian recording artist Lenka, released on 16 June 2015 by Sony Music. "Blue Skies" was released as the lead single on 4 March 2015.

== Background ==
After self-releasing her third studio album, Shadows, on her own label, Skipalong Records, Lenka began writing her fourth effort. Lenka's third album came after her departure from Epic Records. Despite leaving her record company, in May 2015 it was announced that the album would be jointly released between Skipalong and Sony-ATV Music Publishing, which traditionally publishes Lenka's songs. The album was published through Sony ATV's record label, Hickory Records and Sony Red Music Distribution. Co-president of Sony ATV US, Danny Strickt, stated that "Sony/ATV is excited to be taking this innovative approach with Lenka whose music has long been hugely popular with brands, TV shows and filmmakers. The new partnership perfectly illustrates how the company’s A&R and synch teams can effectively combine to create new opportunities for our songwriters." Sony-ATV US vice-president said that "This is a really special partnership Sony/ATV has struck with Lenka. Our synch department has had such incredible success with her in the past and is receiving widespread interest for this new album."

Prior to her solo career, Lenka was known in Australia for her television appearances on Cheez TV and her work with the band Decoder Ring, particularly on the Somersault soundtrack. Although she initially gained recognition domestically as part of ensembles, it was her solo work that drew significant attention abroad, especially in Japan, where she found a particularly strong following. By the time of her fourth album, she had become associated with an indie pop sound characterized by brightness and optimism.

== Critical reception ==
The Bright Side ratings
Review scores
Source	Rating
HTF Magazine	3.5/5 stars
The Music	3/5 stars
Rolling Stone	3/5 stars
The UCSD Guardian	4/5 stars

Darren Levin of Rolling Stone wrote "It's a cloying album at times, but only someone with a heart of stone could deny such a joyous and refreshing worldview", praising Lenka's optimism and the beautiful messages that the songs convey to the listener. Jacqueline Kim from The UCSD Guardian gave the album 4 out of 5 stars and said "Still, we never lose that sense that the entire album sees the world as a glass that's half-full, and for that reason, it's just plain fun to listen to repeatedly. Yes, Lenka's pop sensibilities may sound intended for use in mass media (which would explain why "The Show" worked so well in Moneyball), but really, who's ever been ashamed to listen to something that was probably used as a cheery commercial jingle? Just take a leaf from Lenka's happy-go-lucky philosophy in 'Unique': 'I like to move around to a different beat, / ... /I don't really mind what you all think'." The Music noted that on The Bright Side, Lenka maintains an upbeat and positive mood, conveyed through her soft, breathy vocals. The review observed that the album's pop arrangements give it a soundtrack-like quality suited for commercials or TV series. Tracks such as "Blue Skies" and "Free" were described as lighthearted, while "Unique", with its line "I am me and that's unique", was said to carry a sweet tone.

== Single ==
"Blue Skies" was chosen as the album's lead single, being released on 27 February 2015, exclusively on some news sites where Lenka commented on the song, her inspirations and news about the new album. On 4 March, it was officially released on all digital platforms. Its music video was released on 10 March on her YouTube channel. Directed by her husband James Gulliver Hancock, the production shows Lenka cycling through the city and lying on the green grass of the yard looking at the clouds in the sky and interpreting the song. In some scenes the clouds take the form of letters, hands, hearts and raindrops. Lenka also appears jumping in a trampoline at various times. On 29 May 2015, a remix version of the song was released on a YouTube. On 9 January 2016, Lenka released an extended play of remixes of "Blue Skies".

== Other songs ==
"Unique" was first released in January 2014 in some countries, however, eventually entered the tracklist of the album and was chosen as a promotional track. The music video was recorded in "selfie" format, showing Lenka in several places and with different costumes singing the song. The video still counts on the participation of several fans from all parts of the world, who recorded small videos dancing the song and sent to the official email of Lenka. "Go Deeper" was also released as a promotional album, but did not have a video. In an interview, Lenka revealed that the song was written in 2006 and was inspired by her husband.

== Track listing ==
All songs were written by Lenka Kripac, except where noted.

The Bright Side track listing
No.	Title	Writer(s)	Producer(s)	Length
1.	"The Long Way Home"		Josh Schuberth	3:27
2.	"Blue Skies"		Damian Taylor	4:10
3.	"Free"	Lenka Kripac; Chris Braide	Braide	3:19
4.	"Unique"	Kripac; Jason Reeves	Dan Romer; The Orphanage	3:17
5.	"Get Together"		Josh Schuberth	2:55
6.	"Go Deeper"	Kripac; Jez Colin	Damian Taylor	3:54
7.	"We Are Powerful"	Kripac; Tim Myers	Myers	2:59
8.	"My Love"		Romer; The Orphanage	3:07
9.	"Hearts Brighter"		Tim Sommers	3:50
10.	"The Bright Side"		Schuberth	4:39
Total length:				35:37

iTunes bonus track
No.	Title	Writer(s)	Producer(s)	Length
11.	"It Gets Better"	Kripac; Myers	Myers	2:49
Total length:				38:26

== Charts ==
Chart (2015)	Peak position
South Korean Albums (Circle)	18
