= Shaira =

- Also known as: Shaira/Shairaa Moro; Shairaa
- Born: Shaira Abdullah Alimudin; 2001 or 2002 (age 24–25)
- Origin: Sultan Kudarat, Philippines
- Genre: Pop
- Occupation: Singer
- Instrument: Vocals
- Works: 2019–present
- Label: AHS Productions
- Member of: Trigger
- Spouse: Muiz Abdullah (married 2019)

Shaira Abdullah Alimudin (born 2001 or 2002), known professionally as Shaira Moro or by the mononym Shaira, is a Filipino singer from the Bangsamoro region who is best known for her song "Selos".

== Career ==
Shaira is a Filipino Moro singer who works under the record label AHS Productions. She is also part of the band named Trigger.

She would receive wider public attention online by early 2024, for her song "Selos" which was released the year prior and would earn the reputation as the "Queen of Bangsamoro Pop" in social media.

However, the song which is effectively a cover of the Lenka song "Trouble Is a Friend" would be voluntarily taken down from streaming platforms in March 2024 by her record label over copyright issues.

Three more songs would also be removed from streaming, namely: "Forever Single (Walang Jowa)", "Babaero na Pakboy", and "Machine Gun". They were allegedly derived from Indonesian songs "Masih Mencintainya" by the band Papinka, "Lagi Syantik" by Siti Badriah, and "Uwiw Uwiw" by Cita Citata respectively.

"Selos" would be re-released on April 11, 2024 following month after AHS's negotiations with Lenka's camp.

== Personal life ==
Shaira married Muiz Abdullah in 2019 when both were 17 years old, which is permissible under their religion of Islam. As of 2024, she is a graduating college student who is pursuing a degree in social work. Shaira hails from Sultan Kudarat.

== Discography ==
=== EPs ===
- Manifestations

=== Singles ===
Title	Release	Album	Ref(s)
"Maliga"	2023	Non-album single	
"Masandag a Mama"	2023	Non-album single	
"Gwapo da Kataga Nin"	2023	Non-album single	
"Datu Manis"	2023	Non-album single	
"Pakboy (Fuckboy)"	2023	Non-album single	
"Pabibisyo"	2023	Non-album single	
"Sigupan"	2023	Non-album single	
"Natipbad (Lalaking Abusado)"	2023	Non-album single	
"Maraming Salamat"	2023	Manifestations	
"Selos"	2023	Non-album single	
"Selos Na Yan Friend"	2024	Manifestations	
"Titig"	2024	Non-album single	
"Kabir"	2024	Manifestations	
"Forever Single (Walang Jowa)"	2024	Non-album single	
"Malaki"	2024	Non-album single	
"Mama Matulanged"	2024	Non-album single	
"Bebe"	2024	Non-album single	
"Paagara ko"	2024	Manifestations	
"Lalakeng Seryoso"	2024	Non-album single	
"Ateng"	2024	Non-album single	
"Kiber ni Shaira"	2024	Non-album single	
"Ey Ka Muna"	2024	Non-album single	
"Kiber (Ang Lupit Gumiling)"	2024	Manifestations	
"Lalayon (Maranao Song)"	2025	Non-album single	
"OTW"	2025	Non-album single	
"Hala Ka"	2025	Manifestations	
"Tindeg Ta Sa Kawingan"	2025	Non-album single	
"Oh Sinta"	2025	Non-album single	
"Marupok"	2025	Non-album single	
"Talipekas (Maguindanaon)"	2025	Non-album single	
"Talipekas"	2026	Non-album single	
"Libak"	2026	Non-album single	
"Agaw Pansin"	2026	Non-album single	
"Paulit Ulit"	2026	Non-album single	
"Diploma't Diskarte"	2026	Non-album single	
