= Good Days (Lenka album) =

Studio album by Lenka
- Released: 29 May 2026
- Studios: W Ave 34; Studios 301
- Genre: Pop
- Length: 33:47
- Label: Skipalong
- Producer: Tony Buchen

Lenka chronology
Intraspectral (2023)	Good Days (2026)

Singles from Good Days
- 1. "Sunshine Girl" Released: 10 April 2026; 2. "Good Days" Released: 5 May 2026; 3. "The Balance" Released: 22 May 2026

Good Days is the seventh studio album by the Australian singer-songwriter Lenka. It was released on 29 May 2026, through Skipalong Records. Lenka recorded the album in Sydney with producer Tony Buchen alongside live musicians, with an emphasis on minimal editing and retro-inspired recording techniques. Three singles preceded the album, "Sunshine Girl", the title track and "The Balance". A pop album influenced by vintage 1960s soul-pop, Good Days was depicted as a return to the style of her self-titled debut studio album (2008), influenced by artists such as the Beatles and the Zombies.

== Background and promotion ==
Lenka recorded Good Days at Sydney with a producer Tony Buchen alongside live musicians. She described herself as acting "like a director" during the sessions, as she provided the overall vision while Buchen assembled musicians and used retro recording equipment. The recording process emphasized spontaneity and minimal editing, with Lenka stating that they attempted to "keep the realness of it" by embracing imperfections and limiting the number of takes, particularly for the vocals. According to her, the approach was intended to preserve "the essence of a human being pouring themselves into the playing of the music". In an interview with Rolling Stone Australia, she noted that one of her primary goals for Good Days was for her existing fanbase to "cherish" the album. She expressed a desire to reach new audiences, describing her music as "the soundtrack to people's lives".

Lenka announced her seventh studio album, Good Days, after releasing its lead single "Sunshine Girl" on 10 April 2026. She performed a live performance at City Winery in New York on 17 April. On 5 May, she released a visualizer for her second single, "Good Days". "The Balance" was released on 22 May as the third single of Good Days.

== Music ==
Good Days is a pop album that incorporates elements of soul. Across the album, Lenka adopts various instrumentals such as horns, strings, and layered vocals. It reflects her whimsical and introspective songwriting style with minimal editing and effects which The Sun Malaysia described as "captur[ing] a sense of immediacy and human connection", mainly employing themes of writing, musicianship, and authenticity. Lenka described Good Days as a return to the style of her self-titled debut album (2008), citing influences from 1960s soul-pop acts such as the Beatles and the Zombies, and as an attempt to create a more "classic" record influenced by vintage soul and 1960s pop music. She also stated that the album reflected an attempt to revisit the "essence" of her earlier sound following years of "different tangents" experimentation.

The opening track, "Sunshine Girl", is a soul-infused pop song. According to Lenka, the title track "Good Days" is "a little bit more" of 1960s soul music, since she does not "write songs in a soul way". "They Never Said" features girl group sounds alongside doo-wop elements. The closing track "The Balance" contains flute sounds, and Lenka incorporated words submitted by members of her international fanbase describing experiences of joy and hardship. She used ChatGPT to help organize the submissions into "rhyming stanzas" before revising and tailoring the lyrics herself.

== Track listing ==
All tracks are written by Lenka Kripac; "Love Is a Beat" written with Tony Buchen and Josh Moriarty.

Good Days track listing
No.	Title	Length
1.	"Sunshine Girl"	3:22
2.	"Love Is a Beat"	3:32
3.	"Good Days"	3:39
4.	"They Never Said"	3:19
5.	"Heart Flame"	3:59
6.	"So Far So Good"	3:00
7.	"Mettle"	3:29
8.	"Archetypal"	3:27
9.	"Silver Linings"	3:10
10.	"The Balance"	2:59
Total length:		33:47

== Personnel ==
Credits are adapted from the album's liner notes.

- Lenka – vocals (all tracks), glockenspiel (track 1); toy piano, DX7 (5); piano, Wurlitzer (9)
- Tony Buchen – production, recording, mixing (all tracks); bass (1–9), flute (1, 10); organ, polychord, harpsichord (1); Mellotron (2, 9), vibraphone (5), Hammond (9), upright bass (10)
- Ollie Thorpe – guitar (1, 3–6), electric guitar (2, 8), pedal steel (5), acoustic guitar (8)
- Rob Woolf – Wurlitzer (1–4, 10), Hammond (3, 4, 6, 10), piano (3–8)
- Tully Ryan – drums (1, 3, 5, 8–10), percussion (10)
- Will Endicott – trumpet (1, 3, 6)
- Billy Ward – tenor saxophone (1, 3, 6)
- Rhys Moore – trombone (1, 3, 6)
- Luke Davidson – drums (2, 4, 6), percussion (2, 6)
- Yena Choi – violin (2, 5, 6, 9)
- Kristian Winther – violin (2, 5, 6, 9)
- Katherine Lukey – violin (2, 5, 6, 9)
- Dominic Azzi – violin (2, 5, 6, 9)
- Daniel Lopez – violin (2, 5, 6, 9)
- Anna Murakawa – violin (2, 5, 6, 9)
- Josh Moriarty – acoustic guitars, electric guitars (2)
- Simon French – trumpet (4, 7)
- Dave Reglar – tenor saxophone (4, 7)
- Michael Raper – trombone (4, 7)
- Brad Hasiuk – strings recording assistance
- Leon Zervos – mastering
- Ainslie McNamara – photography
- Caroline Prentice – styling assistance
