= Regine Rocks =

2023–2024 concert by Regine Velasquez

- Tour by Regine Velasquez
- Promotional poster for the concert
- Location: Asia; North America
- Start date: November 25, 2023
- End date: April 19, 2024
- Legs: 3
- No. of shows: 6

Regine Velasquez concert chronology
- Solo (2023); Regine Rocks (2023–2024); ...

Regine Rocks was a concert tour by Filipino singer Regine Velasquez. It commenced on November 25, 2023, at the Mall of Asia Arena in Manila and concluded on April 19, 2024. The shows in the United States began in February 2024 which visited select cities in California. It was initially conceived as a celebration of Velasquez's 35th anniversary since her professional debut, and was promoted as the lead-up event following her concert residency Solo at the Samsung Performing Arts Theater, which ran from February to April 2023. The concert's premise stems from Velasquez's desire to perform rock music and elements of subgenres such as pop rock, and slow rock. The show spans over 2.5 hours, with a set list of 33 songs, including music from rock artists such as Aerosmith, Bon Jovi, Coldplay, Guns N' Roses, Led Zeppelin, Nirvana, Queen, Radiohead, and the Rolling Stones.

The concert was exclusively promoted by iMusic Entertainment, with ticket sales handled by SM Tickets. Paolo Valenciano and Cacai Mitra served as stage directors, while Raul Mitra was the musical director. Yeng Constantino, Klarisse de Guzman, Morissette, and Jona Viray performed as guest acts for the opening night, while Darren Espanto and Juan Karlos Labajo were selected for the final date. Regine Rocks received generally positive reviews from music critics, with particular praise for the production value and artistic direction, as well as Velasquez's showmanship and vocal performance.

== Background and development ==
The development of Regine Rocks began after Regine Velasquez staged her concert residency, titled Solo, at the Samsung Performing Arts Theater. She performed six shows that commenced on February 17, 2023, which marked as a celebration of the 35th anniversary of her professional debut. On April 29, at the conclusion of Solo, Velasquez announced that she would headline a culminating concert on November 25. She has previously performed anniversary shows celebrating her 20th, 25th, and 30th career milestones: Twenty staged at the Araneta Coliseum in 2006, Silver in 2012, and R3.0 in 2017, the latter two held at the Mall of Asia Arena.

On May 19, 2023, Velasquez revealed through ABS-CBNnews.com the official title Regine Rocks, describing it as a "repertoire consisting entirely of rock tunes". She first announced that it will be held at the Mall of Asia Arena through her social media accounts on August 31. The promotional poster depicted a portrait of Velasquez's head shot in white monochrome. The concert was exclusively promoted by iMusic Entertainment, with Paolo Valenciano and Cacai Mitra as stage directors, while Raul Mitra was tapped as musical director. Tickets for the show went on sale for the general public on September 16 and was handled by SM Tickets. The prices for the tickets were from ₱840 to ₱13,440. The Philippine Star has described it as Velasquez's first rock-themed show, while the Philippine Daily Inquirer previewed that she would perform songs from music acts such as Bon Jovi, Led Zeppelin, and Queen.

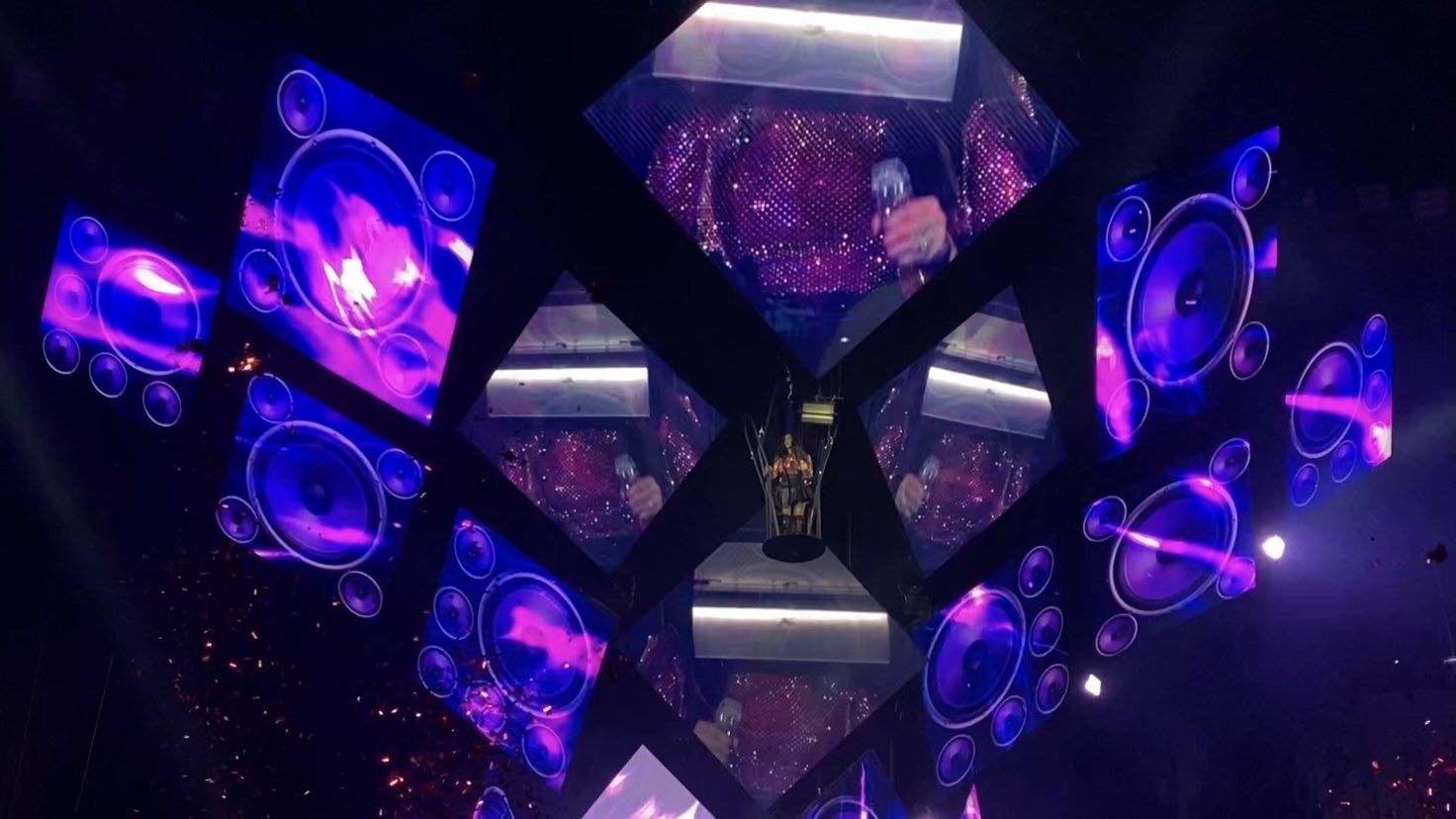
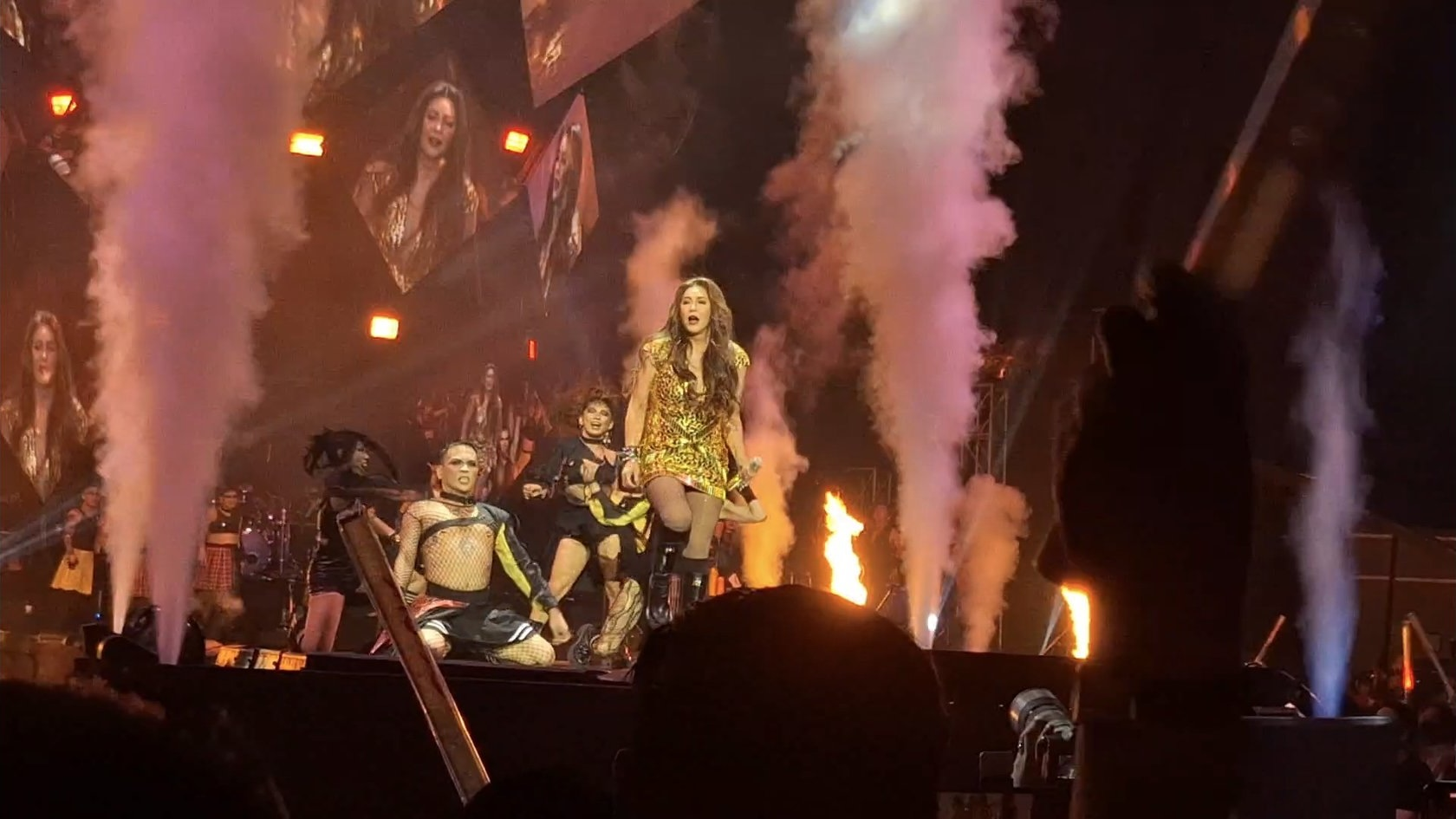
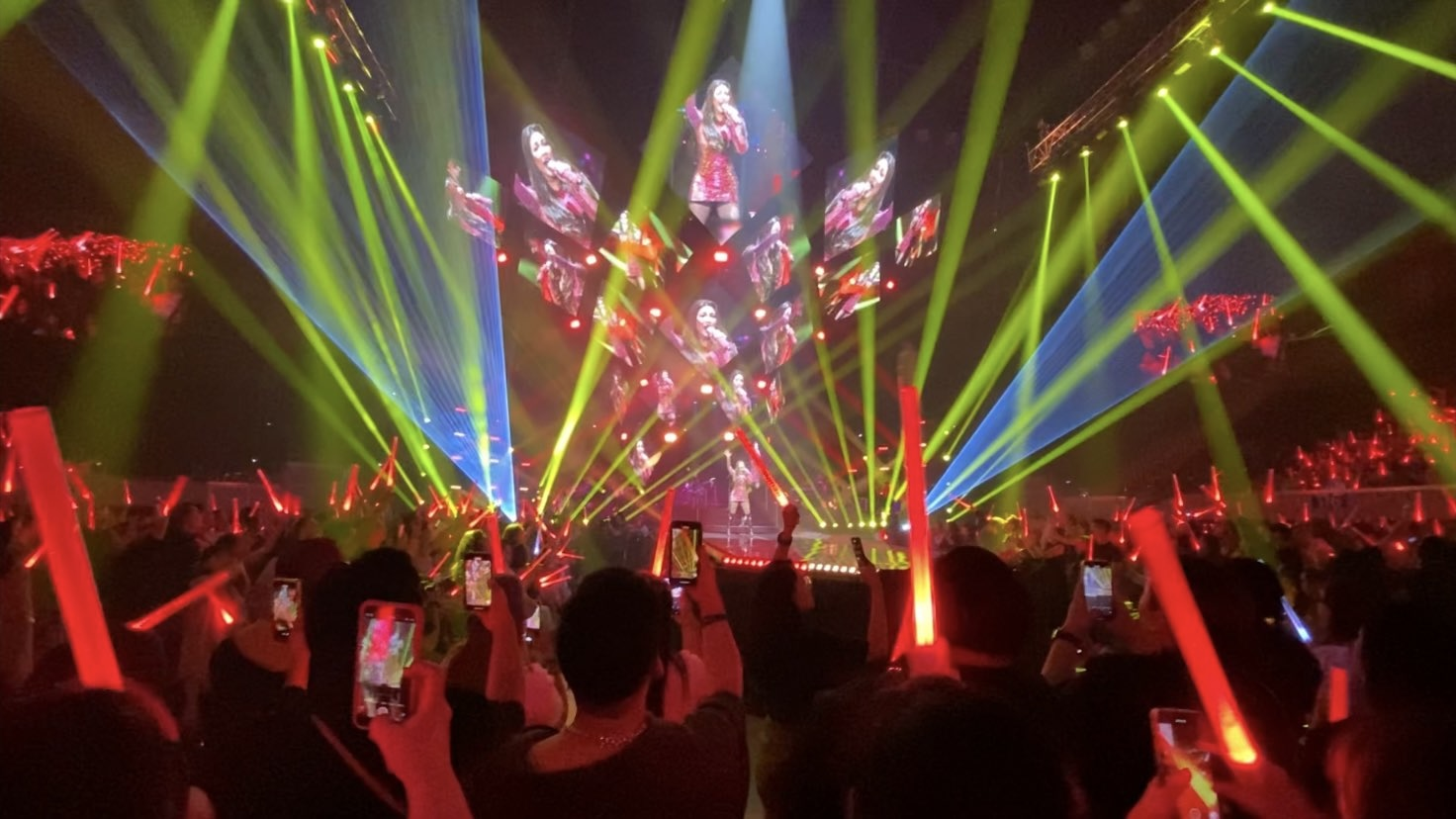
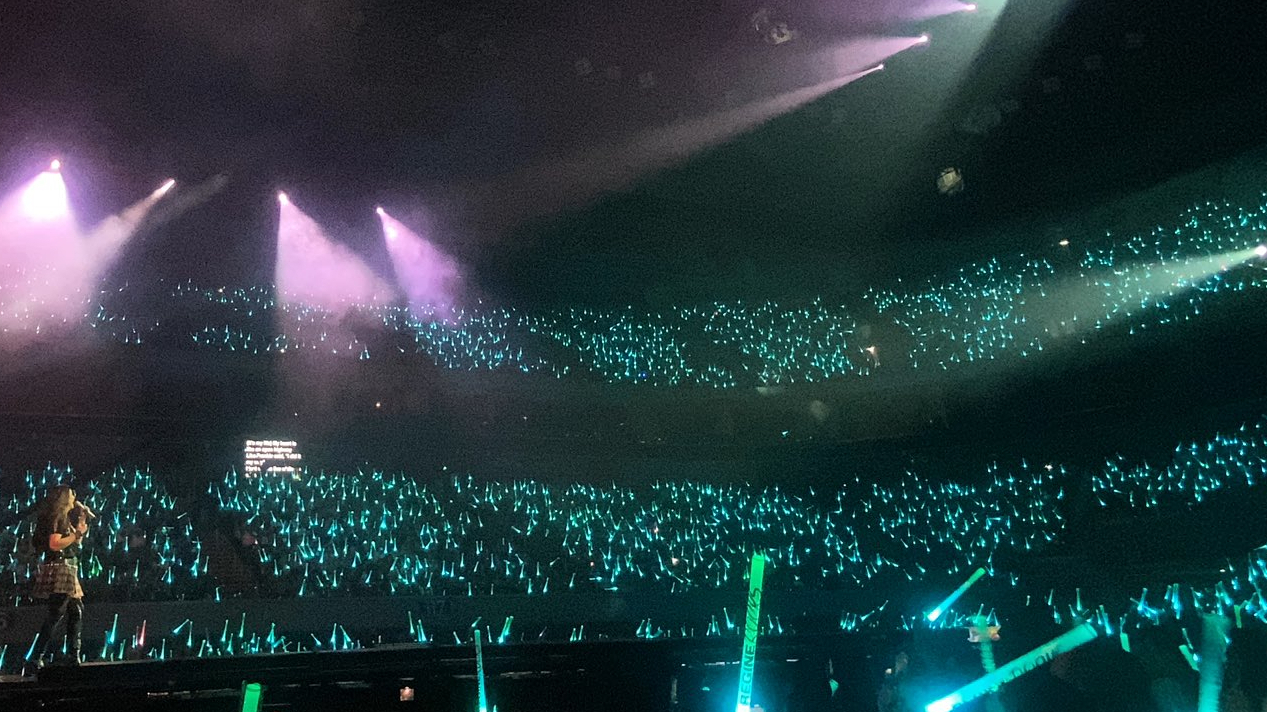
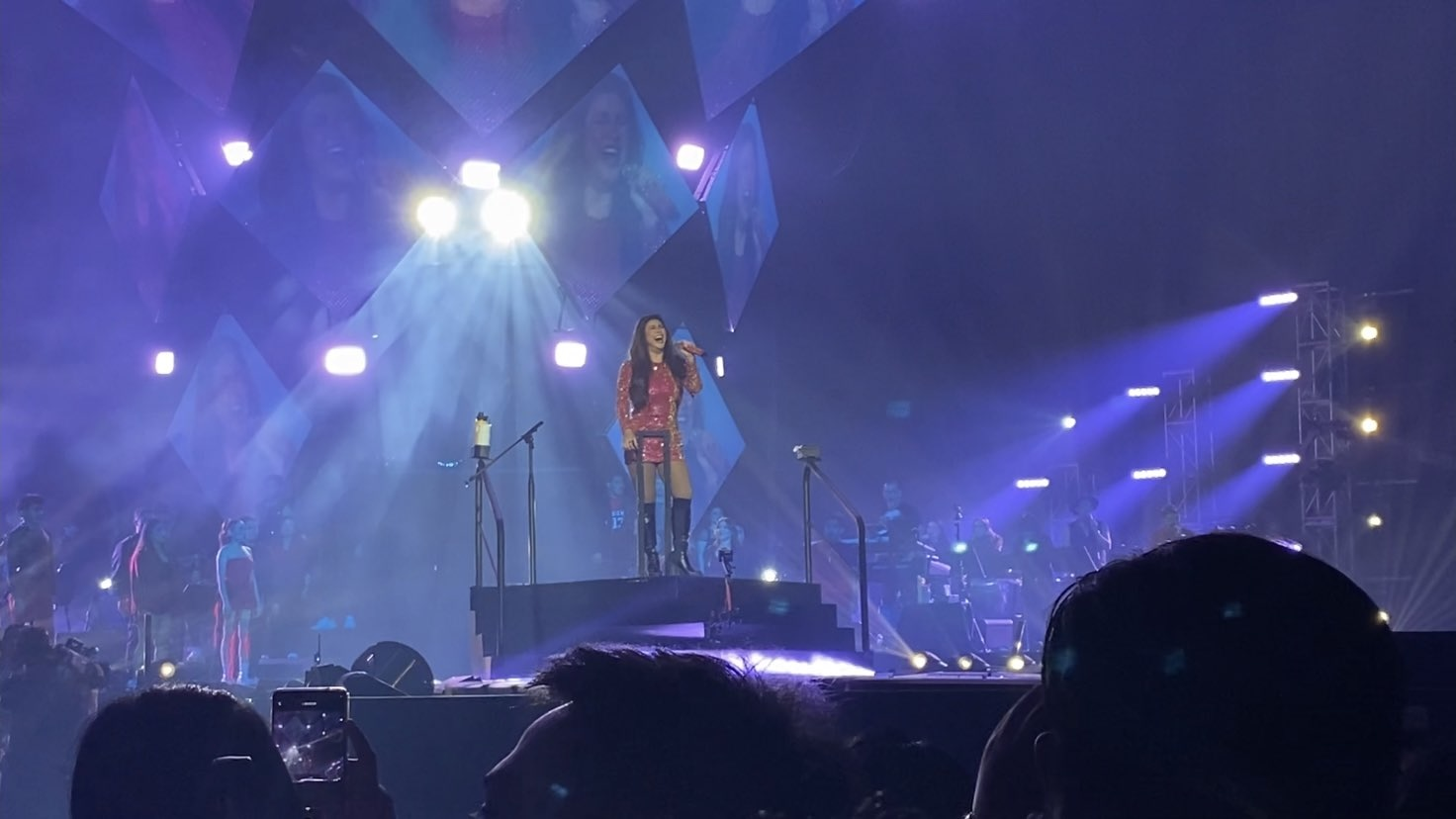
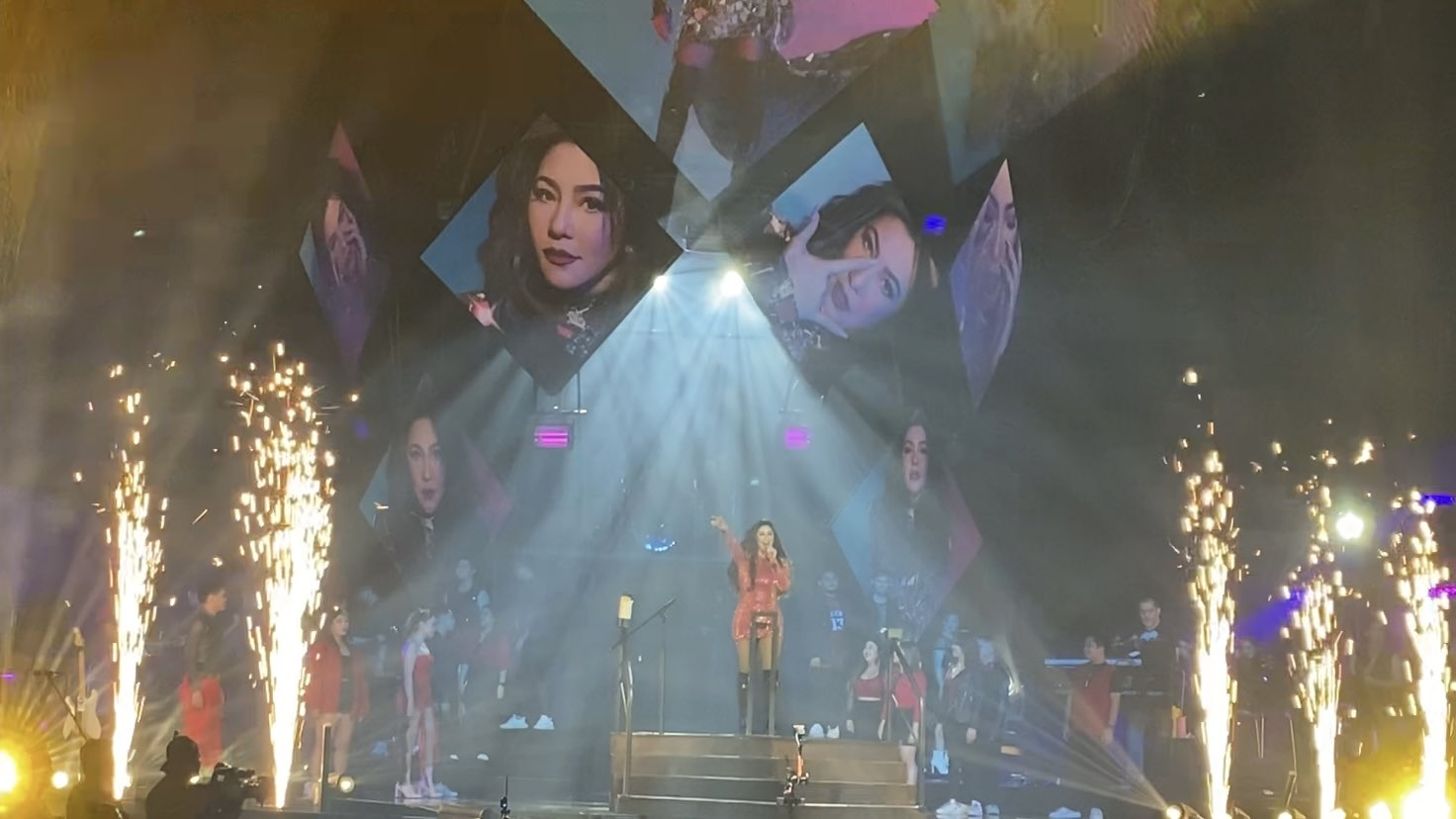
The production consists of LED screens, smoke machines, fire cannons, light beams, coordinated light sticks, hydraulic platforms, and pyrotechnics.

Valenciano described the idea of the concert, "It was conceptualized by both Regine and Cacai ... it was something that they wanted to do since before the pandemic." He added that the show's name and concept were based on Velasquez's desire to explore rock music, seeking to perform material from several subgenres such as pop rock and slow rock, including some of her songs that will be transformed into a rock-oriented production. Viewing it as an opportunity to challenge herself, Velasquez aimed to create a live experience for concertgoers completely different from what she has done in the past. With Regine Rocks, she collaborated on song selection with Cacai, Raul, and Valenciano. They initially came up with 40 song titles, which was eventually reduced. Raul, who was in charge of music direction and a longtime collaborator, called it a "dream project" for Velasquez. She claimed that preparing for the show fueled her artistry: "It's how the songs hit you, how you interpret them, how they make you feel—that's rock ... I'm a balladeer, but I just realized that rock suits me. I never imagined I'd be a rock singer."

The staging consists of a main stage with several digital displays connected by a broad rectangular ramp. It is equipped with a hydraulic platform that moves from the main stage towards the center of the ramp. Enzo Pizarro was in charge of the stage design and described the LED screen layout as heavily inspired by a vortex. Valenciano's objective was "to make everyone feel like Regine was in her prime, just by the stage design", drawing comparison to Velasquez's concert residency, Solo, which he described as "more minimalist". The set featured pyrotechnics, laser lights, smoke machines, and infrared-controlled light sticks. Nico Faustino was in charge of camera direction, while Mandy Marcos was the assistant stage director. GA Fallarme served as the visual designer, with Dominique Gallardo as the lighting director. During the first show, Velasquez invited special guest performers such as Yeng Constantino, Klarisse de Guzman, Morissette, and Jona Viray. This was followed by a series of concerts in Temecula, Los Angeles, and Rohnert Park, California in February 2024. The tour concluded in Manila on April 19, 2024, which featured Darren Espanto and Juan Karlos Labajo as guest acts.

== Concert synopsis ==
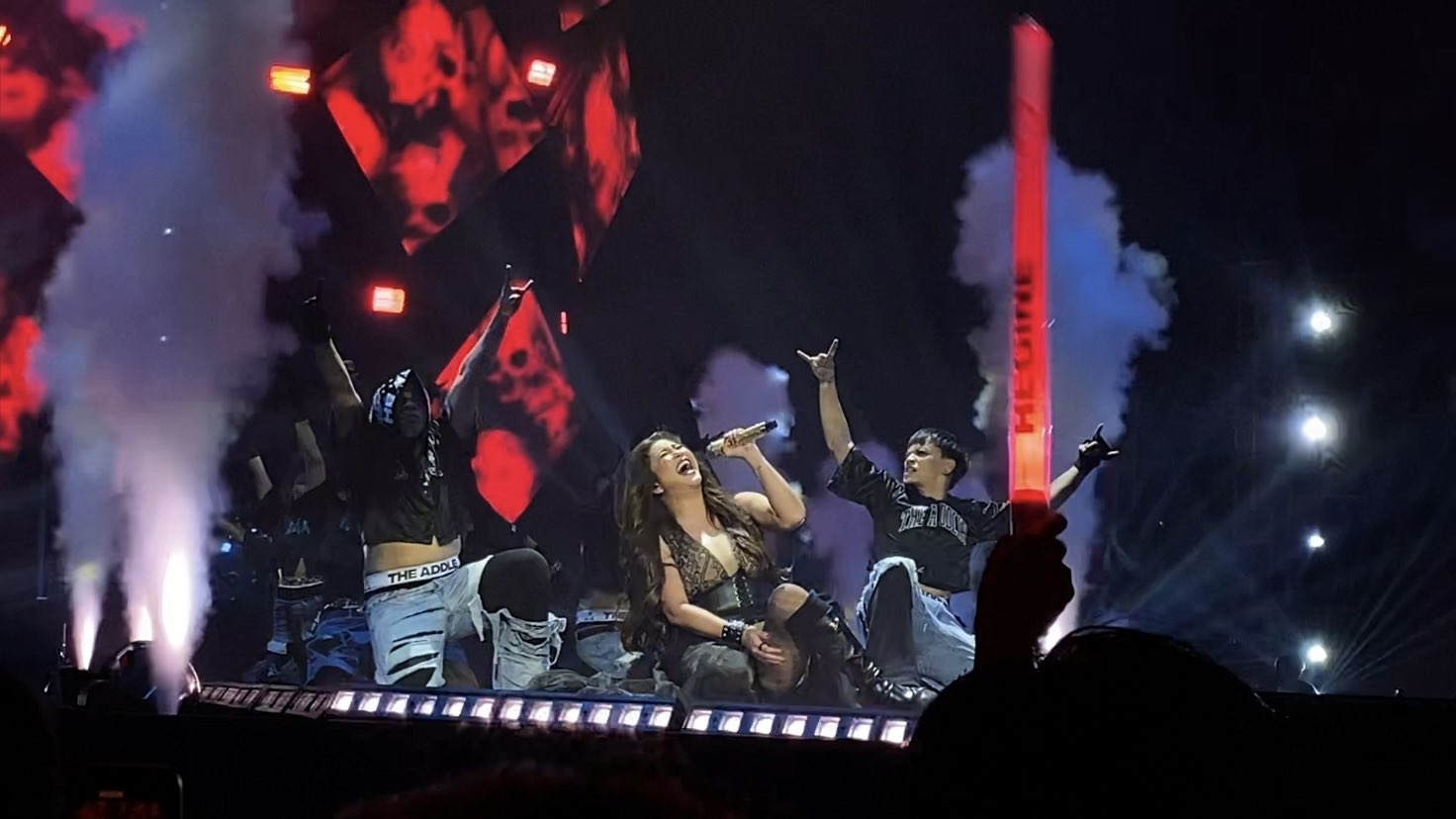
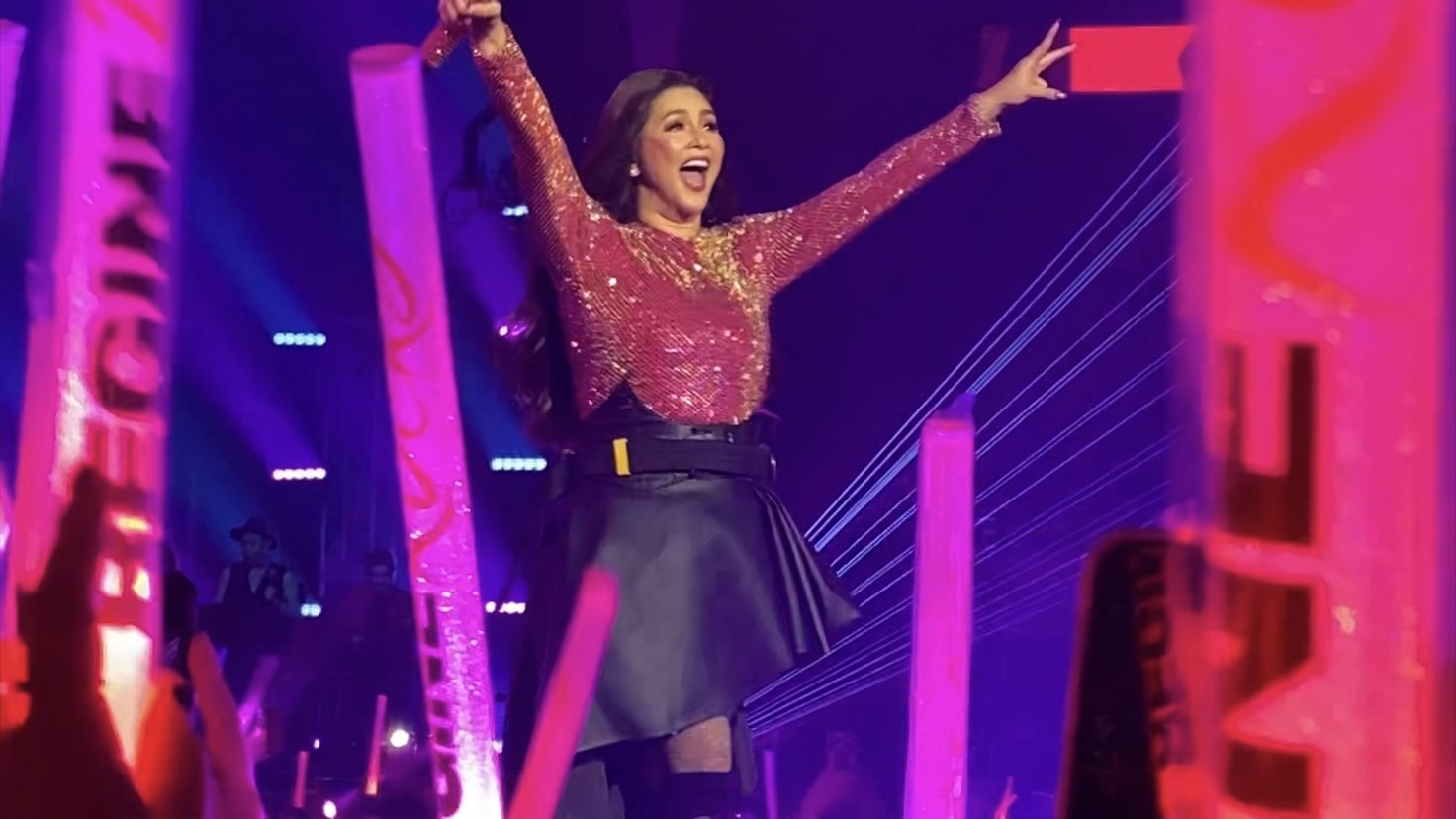
Velasquez performing Filipino rock music: Teeth's grunge-oriented single "Laklak" (top) and Rivermaya's inspirational rock song "Liwanag sa Dilim" (bottom)

Regine Rocks is over two hours and 30 minutes long. The concert opened with Velasquez, in a black bodysuit and metallic blazer, descending from an iron throne-inspired platform and singing excerpts from Queen's "Who Wants to Live Forever" (1986). She continued with a medley of the British rock band's hits, accompanied by dancers wearing gothic inspired costumes. She transitioned to a Bon Jovi tribute number, followed by Guns N' Roses's "Sweet Child o' Mine" (1988). She then delivered a welcome note, before playing Sampaguita's "Bonggahan" (1978). She followed this with Imago's "Sundo" (2006) and Kitchie Nadal's "Huwag Na Huwag Mong Sasabihin" (2004), two songs from Filipino female rock artists. Velasquez was joined by Yeng Constantino at the mid-stage in a performance of "Hawak Kamay". She sat at the elevated platform with a staircase on the main stage for a stripped-down rendition of the Eraserheads's 1996 song "Ang Huling El Bimbo". The segment concluded with her cover of Radiohead's debut single "Creep" (1992).

The second act began with an overture and operatic choir performance, as Velasquez reemerged in a black layered leather skirt with a silver chain top and delivered a rendition of the Rolling Stones's 1966 single Paint It Black. She was then joined by her dancers and sang her cover single "Call Me" (1980). Then, Velasquez honored American rock band Heart by performing a medley of their songs alongside Klarisse de Guzman, Morissette, and Jona Viray. She followed this with pop-rock anthems: Alanis Morissette's "You Oughta Know" (1995) and 4 Non Blondes's "What's Up? (1993). Velasquez ended the act with the 1977 song "Hotel California" from Eagles.

Velasquez changed to a tiered tartan skirt and commenced the last act with Paramore's "The Only Exception", which she dedicated to her husband. Shortly after, she performed her covers of "Fix You" (2005) by Coldplay, "Smells Like Teen Spirit" (1991) by Nirvana, and "Separate Ways (Worlds Apart)" (1983) by Journey. The set list continued with a rock-arranged rendition of Velasquez's 1995 single "You've Made Me Stronger" as she interacted with the audience through call and response. She then changed to a ruffled skirt and sang Led Zeppelin's "Stairway to Heaven" (1971). Next, she performed a mash-up of Aerosmith's "Dream On" (1973) and "I Don't Want to Miss a Thing" (1998), and returned atop the iron-throne platform. The number concluded with a brief pyrotechnics display as she was lifted above the stage. She reappeared on stage and closed the concert with an encore performance of the Filipino rock songs "Liwanag sa Dilim" (2003) and "Hallelujah" (2005).

The setlist was modified for the 2024 show. Many new songs and additional production numbers were included, and the concert spanned three hours long after revisions. A performance of "Bohemian Rhapsody" (1975) opened the show and transitioned directly into a medley of Queen's music. Velasquez continued to perform covers of Filipino rock musicians, adding Teeth's "Laklak" (2006) and Yano's "Banal Na Aso, Santong Kabayo" (1994). A medley of songs from American rock bands were also performed: "My Sacrifice" (2001) by Creed, "The Reason" (2004) by Hoobastank, and "Iris" (1998) by the Goo Goo Dolls. Her single "You Are My Song" (1995) was performed as a rock-oriented arrangement. Velasquez and Darren Espanto sang renditions of Fall Out Boy's "Centuries" (2014) and Evanescence's "Bring Me to Life" (2003). She also performed an Elvis Presley tribute number. Juan Karlos's single "Buwan" (2018) was performed by Velasquez, and she was joined by the band's lead vocalist, Juan Karlos Labajo, for "Ere" (2023).

== Critical reception ==
Regine Rocks was met with positive reviews from critics. ABS-CBNnews.com labeled it a "successful rock concert" which showcased "iconic rock tunes". The writer Ogie Narvaez Rodriguez from Abante acknowledged that Velasquez's concert lived up to expectations, with praise centering on her showmanship and vocal abilities. Writing for Billboard Philippines, Kara Angan commended the first show's production value and artistic direction, highlighting its theme and stage design. She underscored that the concert served as a reminder to everyone that she is "still in her prime". Angan opined that she displayed her "best, electrifying self", and declared that "it is still Regine Velasquez-Alcasid's world and we're just living in it". In her review of the final show, Angan continued to emphasize the versatility of its music, visuals, and performance art, complimenting Velasquez's stage presence and commitment to her artistry. She declared Regine Rocks as a "jaw-dropping" spectacle and concluded: "It's a tall order for any performer—classically trained or not—to fill ... but she made it look like a walk in the park".

== Set list ==
The set list given below was performed on November 25, 2023. The list evolved over the course of the tour, and sometimes included other numbers.

1. "Who Wants to Live Forever" / "We Will Rock You" / "Another One Bites the Dust" / "Radio Ga Ga"
2. "It's My Life" / "You Give Love a Bad Name" / "Livin' on a Prayer"
3. "Sweet Child o' Mine"
4. "Bonggahan"
5. "Sundo" / "Huwag Na Huwag Mong Sasabihin" / "Hawak Kamay"
6. "Ang Huling El Bimbo"
7. "Creep"
8. "Paint It Black"
9. "Call Me"
10. "What About Love" / "Nobody Home" / "These Dreams" / "Alone"
11. "You Oughta Know"
12. "What's Up?"
13. "Hotel California"
14. "The Only Exception"
15. "Fix You"
16. "Smells Like Teen Spirit"
17. "Separate Ways (Worlds Apart)"
18. "You've Made Me Stronger"
19. "Stairway to Heaven"
20. "Dream On" / "I Don't Want to Miss a Thing"

Encore

21. "Liwanag sa Dilim"
22. "Hallelujah"

== Shows ==
List of concerts, showing date, city, country, and venue
Date	City	Country	Venue
Leg 1 — Asia
November 25, 2023	Manila	Philippines	Mall of Asia Arena
Leg 2 — North America
February 9, 2024	Temecula	United States	Pechanga Resort & Casino
February 16, 2024	Rohnert Park	United States	Graton Resort & Casino
February 18, 2024	Rohnert Park	United States	Graton Resort & Casino
Leg 3 — Asia
April 19, 2024	Manila	Philippines	Mall of Asia Arena

== Cancelled shows ==
List of cancelled concerts, showing date, city, country, venue, and reason for cancellation
Date	City	Country	Venue	Reason
February 13, 2024 (Note: Postponed due to production issues, show to be rescheduled)	Los Angeles	United States	Saban Theatre	Production issues

== See also ==
- List of Regine Velasquez live performances
