= Everything at Once =

Single by Lenka

from the album Two
- Released: 4 November 2012
- Length: 2:38
- Label: Epic; Sony
- Songwriter: Lenka Kripac
- Producer: David Kosten

Lenka singles chronology
"Two" (2011)	"Everything at Once" (2012)	"Heart to the Party" (2013)

Music video
- "Everything at Once" on YouTube

"Everything at Once" is a song written and recorded by the Australian singer Lenka. It was released on 4 November 2012 as the third single from her second studio album, Two (2011).

== Release and commercial performance ==
"Everything at Once" was originally released as her second studio album Two's second promotional single in 2011; but it was later released as an official single in November 2012. It was featured in a Windows 8 commercial and Disney Studio All Access trailer, becoming Lenka's second most successful single after 2008's "The Show".

== Music video and live performance ==
Lenka performed "Everything at Once" in Jimmy Kimmel Live! with "Heart Skips a Beat". Its music video shows Lenka wearing a black and white striped dress dancing with two women with the background matching Lenka's dress. She starts miming with her hands the things she wants to be. Then, she starts dancing with eyes painted on her hands. She then forms a circle with the other women and begins to switch the background in order to match her and the women's dresses. The video then ends with Lenka falling backwards into the women's arms.

== Track listings ==
CD single

1. "Everything at Once" – 2:39
2. "Deep Blue" – 3:50

Digital download – EP

1. "Everything at Once" – 2:39
2. "The Show" – 3:56
3. "Trouble Is a Friend" – 3:36
4. "Heart Skips a Beat" – 3:22

== Charts ==
=== Weekly charts ===
Weekly chart performance
Chart (2012–2013)	Peak position
Austria (Ö3 Austria Top 40)	24
Belgium (Ultratop 50 Flanders)	8
Belgium (Ultratop 50 Wallonia)	8
Canada Hot 100 (Billboard)	69
CIS Airplay (TopHit)	2
Czech Republic Airplay (ČNS IFPI)	1
Germany (GfK)	18
Germany (Airplay Chart)	1
Hungary (Rádiós Top 40)	12
Ireland (IRMA)	63
Netherlands (Single Top 100)	27
Russia Airplay (TopHit)	5
Slovakia Airplay (ČNS IFPI)	93
South Korea (Gaon Digital Chart)	125
South Korea International Singles (Gaon)	7
Switzerland (Schweizer Hitparade)	53
UK Singles (Official Charts)	69
Ukraine Airplay (TopHit)	14

=== Year-end charts ===
Year-end charts
Chart (2012)	Position
South Korea (Gaon International Chart)	153
Chart (2013)	Position
Belgium (Ultratop Wallonia)	75
Germany (Official German Charts)	93
Hungary (Rádiós Top 40)	69
Russia Airplay (TopHit)	101
South Korea (Gaon International Chart)	48
South Korea (Gaon International Chart)	194
Ukraine Airplay (TopHit)	78

== Certifications ==
List of certifications and sales
Region	Certification	Certified units/sales
Germany (BVMI)	Gold	150,000^{^}
South Korea (Gaon)	—	243,623
^{^} Shipments figures based on certification alone.
