= Solo (residency) =

2023 concert residency by Regine Velasquez

- Residency by Regine Velasquez
- Promotional poster for the residency
- Location: Makati, Metro Manila, Philippines
- Venue: Samsung Performing Arts Theater
- Start date: February 17, 2023
- End date: April 29, 2023
- Legs: 1
- No. of shows: 6

Regine Velasquez concert chronology
- Freedom: The Regine Velasquez-Alcasid Digital Concert (2021); Solo (2023); Regine Rocks (2023–2024)

Solo was a concert residency by Filipino singer Regine Velasquez at the Samsung Performing Arts Theater in Makati. Consisting of six shows, it began on February 17 and concluded on April 29, 2023. After not performing for a live audience following the outbreak of the COVID-19 pandemic, Velasquez conceived the concert residency to celebrate the 35th anniversary of her professional debut. She described the show's concept as an artistic journey, with performances that would be devoid of front acts or special guests.

Velasquez aimed to create an intimate experience for concertgoers, which she found challenging for shows held in arenas. The set list contained songs she has never performed before and featured music from mainstream acts, such as Lizzo, Charlie Puth, Elvis Presley, and Madonna, as well as viral hits from the online video platform TikTok. It was exclusively promoted by iMusic Entertainment, with Raul Mitra serving as the music director, and Paolo Valenciano chosen as the stage director. Solo was critically appreciated, receiving praise for its theme and Velasquez's vocal abilities, and connection with the audience.

== Background and development ==
On August 3, 2022, Regine Velasquez revealed through ABS-CBNnews.com and her social media accounts that she would be performing a concert residency for a live audience in February 2023 at the Samsung Performing Arts Theater in Makati. It marked her first solo concert in two years since the COVID-19 pandemic, having only performed a livestreaming showcase, titled Freedom, on February 28, 2021. She co-headlined Iconic with Sharon Cuneta in October 2019, and teamed with Sarah Geronimo for Unified in March 2020. In November 20, Velasquez announced that Solo would be staged on four dates consisting of Friday and Saturday night shows between February 17–25. It was exclusively promoted by iMusic Entertainment, with Raul Mitra selected as the music director and Paolo Valenciano as the stage director. Tickets went on sale for all four shows on November 30. The concert series was conceived as part of the singer's 35th anniversary celebration since her professional debut. All the tickets made available for the shows sold out. Due to the high demand, two extra shows were added in April.

When explaining the concept and title of the show in an interview with entertainment podcast State of the Arts, Velasquez asserted, "The concerts that I do where I'm comfortable [performing] are the smaller, more intimate venues ... I'm okay with that because I feel relaxed and I can see people's faces." She added that working on a small-venue show allows her to conceptualize themes and encourages an artistic exploration with a variety of music genres. Unlike her previous concerts which featured co-headliners, Solo follows a recurring element of performances without any guests or special participants. With the concert series, she previewed, "There's a lot of new songs ... songs that you'll probably not expect me to sing." Velasquez revealed, these included music that had gone viral on the online video platform TikTok.

== Concert synopsis ==
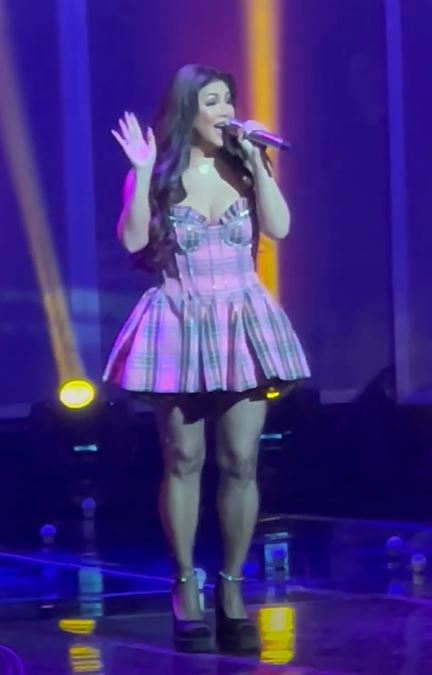
Velasquez sings a cover of Zack Tabudlo's "Binibini".

The concert ran for two hours. The stage featured a video wall backdrop, flashing neon lights, and smoke. Velasquez appeared on stage to an elevated platform and opened the show with Donna Lewis's "I Love You Always Forever" wearing a pink plaid Bavarian-inspired mini dress. She descended the podium and began Lizzo's up-tempo hit "About Damn Time", and performed the song's rap routine. She continued into a popular TikTok tune, Stacey Ryan's "Fall in Love Alone", and followed this with performances of tracks from Filipino musicians: Zack Tabudlo's "Binibini", Ferdinand Aragon's "Disinasadya", and Adie's "Paraluman". Shortly after, she began with Madonna's "Crazy for You", which she dedicated to her husband. Following the performance, she spoke briefly about her late father, who enjoyed listening to the music of Elvis Presley, before transitioning into a medley of the American rock and roll singer's ballad hits. The next number on the set list was her original song "Tanging Mahal", which was followed with a performance of another TikTok tune, Jvke's "Golden Hour".

The second act saw Velasquez changing outfits into a graphic-printed fishtail gown and beginning a performance of Charlie Puth's "We Don't Talk Anymore". This was followed by a holographic duet with herself singing The Juans's "Istorya" and "Hindi Tayo Pwede". She then proceeded with "OK Lang Ako", a track from her 2010 album Fantasy. A medley of songs by Filipina singer Ella May Saison were performed, before doing renditions of ABBA's "The Winner Takes It All" and Toto's "I'll Be Over You". The set list continued with an upbeat arrangement of her single "You've Made Me Stronger". Joni Mitchell's "Both Sides, Now" and Dua Lipa's "Love Again" were performed after. She then paid tribute to her son with Ben Rector's "Extraordinary Magic", as images of them were projected on the video screen. For Jessie J's "Flashlight", concertgoers illuminated their phones that flickered and flashed as they sang along with Velasquez. After the song ended, she bowed and thanked the audience before exiting the stage. For the encore, Velasquez returned on stage and sang her single "Araw Gabi". She closed the show with a performance of George Michael's "Freedom!".

== Critical reception ==
In a review of the opening night, Leah Salterio writing for ABS-CBNnews.com, highly praised Velasquez's "dauntless" live performance, and described her vocals as "pitch perfect" and "stratospheric". She believed the show was well-staged and commented that only Velasquez could manage to pull off a production of that scale. Salterio concluded, "There were no front act or guest to alternately regale the audience ... from start to finish, it was only Velasquez who ruled the stage and held the audience at the palm of her hand." Janelle Cabrera-Paraiso of Metro also complimented the singer's vocal range which "allowed her to render modern-day, millennial-favorite tracks flawlessly". She further remarked, "With over three decades of experience in the department, Regine's musical career is a mold not any name can easily fit. At 52, she is an exemplar of her craft and an icon to look up to in the industry".

== Set list ==
The set list given below was performed on February 17, 2023.

1. "I Love You Always Forever"
2. "About Damn Time"
3. "Fall in Love Alone"
4. "Binibini"
5. "Disinasadya"
6. "Paraluman"
7. "Crazy for You"
8. "Can't Help Falling in Love" / "Love Me Tender" / "Always on My Mind"
9. "Tanging Mahal"
10. "Golden Hour"
11. "We Don't Talk Anymore"
12. "Istorya" / "Hindi Tayo Pwede"
13. "OK Lang Ako"
14. "Now That You're Gone" / "Till My Heartaches End" / "If the Feeling Is Gone"
15. "The Winner Takes It All"
16. "I'll Be Over You"
17. "You've Made Me Stronger"
18. "Both Sides, Now"
19. "Love Again"
20. "Extraordinary Magic"
21. "Flashlight"

Encore

22. "Araw Gabi"
23. "Freedom!"

== Shows ==
List of concerts, showing date, city and venue
Date	City	Venue
February 17, 2023	Makati	Samsung Performing Arts Theater
February 18, 2023	Makati	Samsung Performing Arts Theater
February 24, 2023	Makati	Samsung Performing Arts Theater
February 25, 2023	Makati	Samsung Performing Arts Theater
April 28, 2023	Makati	Samsung Performing Arts Theater
April 29, 2023	Makati	Samsung Performing Arts Theater

== See also ==
- List of Regine Velasquez live performances
