= Intraspectral =

2023 studio album by Lenka

Studio album by Lenka
- Released: 17 November 2023
- Recorded: 2022–2023
- Studio: Golden Retriever; Endomusia
- Length: 36:51
- Label: Skipalong
- Producer: Dave Jenkins Jr; Josh Schuberth; Lenka

Lenka chronology
Attune (2017)	Intraspectral (2023)	Good Days (2026)

Singles from Intraspectral
- 1. "Silhouette" Released: 25 August 2023; 2. "Champion" Released: 6 October 2023

Intraspectral is the sixth studio album by the Australian singer-songwriter Lenka. It was released on 17 November 2023, by Skipalong Records.

== Background and theme ==
Following a brief hiatus after her previous work, Attune (2017), Lenka collaborated with producer Dave Jenkins Jr to create her sixth studio album Intraspectral. She coined the title from "intra" (within) and "spectral" (spectrum), describing it as "the rainbow within" to reflect the emotional diversity within oneself. Drawing from her acting background, Lenka embraced varied musical styles and character-driven performances. Balancing upbeat tracks like "Champion" with darker moments, the album aims to bring comfort and positivity while acknowledging life's challenges. Intraspectral was released on 17 November 2023, supported by a three-city tour in Australia.

Intraspectral is a collaborative project between Lenka and producer Dave Jenkins Jr, recorded in Eora and Sydney throughout 2022 and 2023. The album explores a wide range of upbeat, genre-blending styles, drawing influence from 1980s, late 1990s, and early 2000s indie pop. Described by Lenka as an "emergence album", it reflects themes of stepping back into the world with renewed joy and introspection. She expressed pride in the album's diverse, vintage-inspired sound, calling it a deeply personal and creatively fulfilling work.

== Singles ==
Lenka released the pre-release single "One Moment" on 15 April 2023, accompanied by a behind-the-scenes video. It was followed by the album's lead single, "Silhouette", released on 25 August 2023 along with its music video. A month later, she released the second and final single from the album, "Champion", featuring Josh Pyke.

== Critical reception ==
MXDWN stated in its review, "the emotional depth of this album is a journey for listeners to understand their magnitude of emotions and feelings", "What portrays this the most is the instrumental use of synthesizers, releasing her creativity, and the sweet sounds of her voice".

== Track listing ==
Intraspectral track listing
No.	Title	Writer(s)	Producer(s)	Length
1.	"The Entire Spectrum"	Lenka	Lenka	1:56
2.	"Champion" (featuring Josh Pyke)	Lenka; Pyke	Dave Jenkins Jr	3:24
3.	"Cabin in the Woods"	Lenka; Jenkins; Lucy Taylor	Jenkins	3:43
4.	"Silhouette"	Lenka; Josh Schuberth	Schuberth	3:49
5.	"Real Real Love"	Lenka	Jenkins	3:34
6.	"Okay"	Lenka	Jenkins	3:30
7.	"One Moment"	Lenka	Jenkins	3:47
8.	"Badly"	Lenka; Ben Corbett	Corbett; Jenkins	3:24
9.	"Unsaid"	Lenka; Jenkins	Jenkins	3:31
10.	"Hanging Tough"	Lenka	Jenkins	2:55
11.	"Ultraviolet"	Lenka; Julia Hamilton	Jenkins	3:25
Total length:				36:51

== Personnel ==
Credits were adapted from the liner notes.

=== Locations ===
- Golden Retriever (live band recording: track 3–8, 10)
- Endomusia Studios (recording: track 4)
- Rising Tide Studios (mixing: all tracks)
- Studios 301 (mastering)

=== Musicians ===
- Lenka – vocals, keyboards (all tracks)
- Ben Corbett – guitar (track 3–8)
- Ross James – bass guitar (track 3, 5–8)
- Dave Jenkins Jr – guitar, bass, keyboards, percussion (track 2, 9–10); drums, percussion (all tracks)
- Josh Schuberth – guitar, bass, keyboards, beats (track 4)
- Josh Pyke – additional vocals (track 2)
- Berry Public School Choir – choir vocals (track 7)

=== Technical ===
- Simon Berckelmon – recording (live band tracks 3–8, 10)
- Dave Jenkins Jr – mixing (all tracks)
- Steve Smart – mastering

=== Art and design ===
- Tanja Bruckner – cover photography
- Dave Jenkins Jr – studio photography
