= Attune =

Studio album by Lenka
- Released: 13 October 2017
- Length: 41:40
- Label: Skipalong; Sony
- Producer: Lenka

Lenka chronology
The Bright Side (2015)	Attune (2017)	Intraspectral (2023)

Singles from Attune
- 1. "Heal" Released: 8 September 2017

Attune is the fifth studio album by Australian recording artist Lenka, released on 13 October 2017 by Skipalong Records. "Heal" was released as the lead single from Attune on 8 September 2017.

Attune includes a paper-art diorama designed by James Gulliver Hancock, which customers can assemble themselves. The album did not chart in any market but received some positive reviews. Rolling Stone Australia noted its blend of light pop accessibility with deeper, thought-provoking themes.

== Singles ==
The album's lead single "Heal" was released on 8 September 2017. The song was written by Lenka and Sally Seltmann. "The song is inspired by conflict in relationships and how to get through it", said Lenka on her website. A music video which was directed by Lenka while her husband James Gulliver Hancock directed the artwork, was released on 13 September 2017 on her YouTube channel which featured her dancing with two dancers.

=== Promotional single ===
"Lucky" was chosen as the album's promotional single, being released on 11 August 2017. Lenka stated on her website that she wrote the song after having her daughter last year and the song was inspired by feeling the love in a big way on her daughter. The song had a digital video and was first released on 23 December 2016. The video only covered partial lyrics of the song and featured Lenka singing and playing her guitar.

== Additional feature ==
Attune includes a paper-art diorama designed by James Gulliver Hancock which requires customers to make it by themselves. Lenka released a video on 4 October 2017 on her website showing people how to turn the Attune CD cover into a pop-up diorama.

== Critical reception ==
Attune ratings
Review scores
Source	Rating
CityHub	3/5 stars
Forte Magazine	3/5 stars

The album failed to chart in any market, though Attune received positive reviews from some music critics. The album was previewed and commented by Rolling Stone Australia on 11 October 2017. Jonny Nail of Rolling Stone Australia said, "Attune is a remarkable rabbit-warren of an album, sucking us in with its seemingly shallow light-pop accessibility and then keeping us captivated with the underlying darkness and thought-provoking themes that bubble to the surface with little warning throughout". Lenka was complimented for her invigoration and significant messages of the songs in Attune.

== Track listing ==
All tracks are written and produced by Lenka Kripac, except where noted.

Attune track listing
No.	Title	Writer(s)	Length
1.	"Every Bird That Sings"		3:13
2.	"Arrow"		3:18
3.	"Heal"	Kripac; Sally Seltmann	4:00
4.	"Lucky"		3:20
5.	"Homo Sapien"		3:56
6.	"Flesh and Bone"		3:40
7.	"Slow Lane"		3:40
8.	"Animal (River Spirits)"		4:17
9.	"Bittersweet"		3:50
10.	"Crystal Ball"		3:27
11.	"Boom (Flesh and Bone Reprise)"		0:41
12.	"Disappear"		4:14
Total length:			41:40

== Charts ==
Chart (2017)	Peak position
South Korean International Albums (Gaon)	12
