= Lenka =

Australian singer and actress (born 1978)

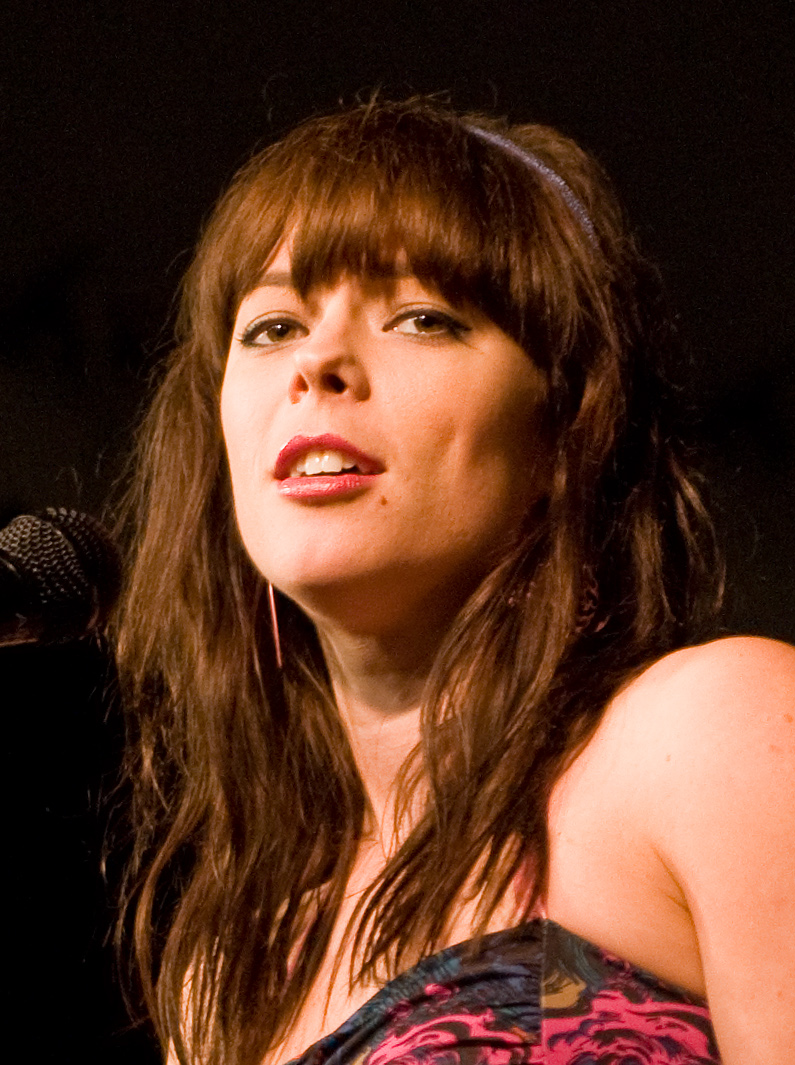
- Lenka in 2009

Background information
- Also known as: Lenka
- Born: Lenka Eden Kripac; 19 March 1978 (age 48); Bega, New South Wales, Australia
- Occupations: Singer-songwriter; actress
- Instruments: Vocals; piano; trumpet; tambourine; castanet; ukulele
- Works: Discography
- Years active: 1994–present
- Labels: Epic; Skipalong
- Website: lenkamusic.com

Lenka Eden Kripac (born 19 March 1978) is an Australian singer-songwriter and actress. She is best known for her 2008 single "The Show", which has been used in several advertisements for Old Navy, as well as the Nickelodeon film Angus, Thongs and Perfect Snogging and the 2011 film Moneyball. Her 2012 song "Everything at Once" was used in a Windows 8 television advertisement and a Disney Studio All Access commercial. Her most played songs on BBC are "All My Bells Are Ringing", "We Will Not Grow Old", "Everything at Once", "Don't Let Me Fall", and "Trouble Is a Friend".

== Early life ==
The daughter of Czech jazz trumpet musician Jiří Křipač and an Australian schoolteacher Eden, Lenka was born on 19 March 1978 and was raised in the Australian coastal town of Bega until age seven, when her family moved to Sydney. There she received her schooling, acting and music training, and started to work as a highly regarded theatre actress and later musician.

== Career ==
=== 1994–2007: Early years ===
As a teenager, Lenka studied acting at the Australian Theatre for Young People, where she trained with actress Cate Blanchett. Lenka starred in the Australian ABC-TV drama series GP as Vesna Kapek in the 1990s. She also hosted Cheez TV and has guest starred in other Australian TV series, including Home and Away, Wildside, Head Start, and Spellbinder. She appeared in Australian feature films The Dish and Lost Things, as well as in theatre productions. Lenka provided the vocals for two tracks on Paul Mac's 2005 album Panic Room, including its title track. She also served a member of the Australian electronic-rock crossover band Decoder Ring for two of their albums between 2004 and 2005. She then moved to California in 2007.

=== 2008–2013: Self-titled debut album ===
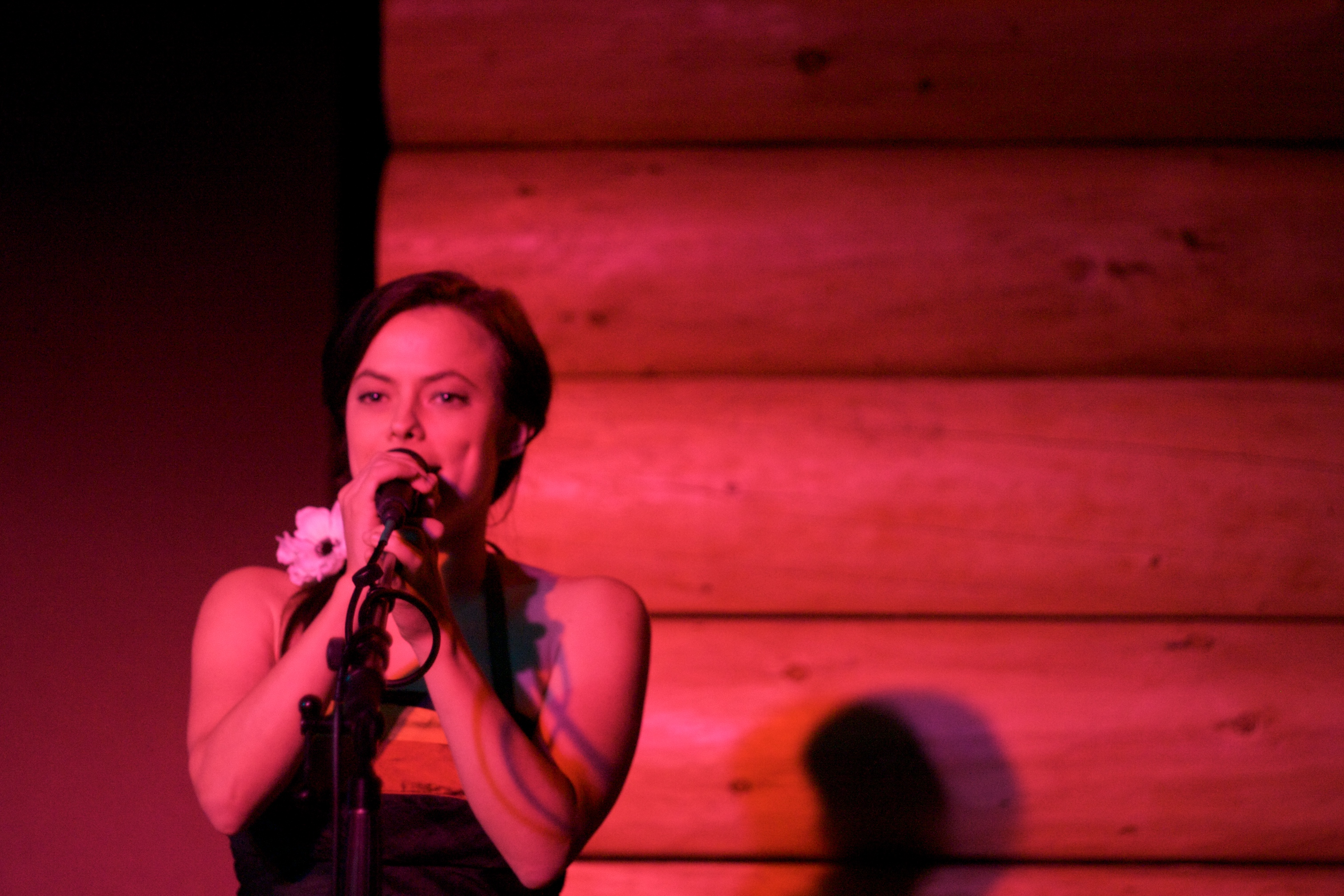
Lenka at the Hotel Cafe Tour at Doug Fir in Portland, Oregon

After adopting her first name as her sole artistic name, Lenka released her eponymous debut album on 24 September 2008, with "The Show", produced by Stuart Brawley, chosen to be the first single release from the set. The song appeared in various advertisements, including a major campaign for Old Navy, and was also featured in the Nickelodeon film Angus, Thongs and Perfect Snogging, as well as the 2011 film Moneyball. The album Lenka peaked at number 142 on the US Billboard 200. As a music artist, Lenka creates paper art type stop-motion animated music videos for each of her singles with her husband James Gulliver Hancock, a visual artist from Australia, for a deliberately childlike effect. She also provided vocals on two tracks ("Addicted" and "Sunrise") on German artist Schiller's album Atemlos, released in Germany on 12 March 2010.

In 2011, Lenka released her second studio album titled Two, which was inspired by her engagement and is full of romantic love songs. Despite a warm critical reception, the album failed to match the success of her debut album, reaching peak chart positions of 69 and 88 on the Belgian and Swiss charts, respectively. Its single, "Everything at Once", was featured in a Windows 8 advertisement and in a Disney Studio All Access commercial, becoming a worldwide success. Her third studio album, Shadows, was released in 2013— following the birth of her son Quinn who was featured in the music video for the album's lead single, "Heart to the Party".

=== 2015–present: Subsequent releases ===
Lenka's fourth studio album The Bright Side, was released in 2015 and the most featured single in this album became "Blue Skies". A remix version of the song, released on the YouTube remix channel Trap Nation, has over 30 million views on YouTube. Her fifth studio album, Attune, was released in 2017 and contains the track "Heal", which was created in cooperation with Australian singer and author Sally Seltmann. In 2023, She released her sixth studio album, Intraspectral. The album contains the single "Champion", featuring Australian singer Josh Pyke. In 2025, Lenka began the Magenta Tour starting in China, following the release of her song "Magenta". On 4 July 2025, Lenka revealed that she is going back into the studio for her upcoming seventh studio album. Lenka released its lead single, "Sunshine Girl", on 10 April 2026. That month, the album's title was revealed, Good Days, set to be released on May 29. Its title track was unveiled on 5 May.

== Personal life ==
Lenka currently resides in regional New South Wales, Australia. She is married to visual artist James Gulliver Hancock. She announced on 27 September 2011 that she was pregnant. In March 2012, she announced on Twitter that she had given birth to a boy named Quinn. In 2016, she gave birth to her daughter, Etta.

== Filmography ==
=== Film ===
Year	Title	Role	Notes
2000	The Dish	Marie McIntyre	Feature film
2004	Lost Things	Emily	Feature film

=== Television ===
Year	Title	Role	Notes
1994	Home and Away	Francine 'Frankie' Brooks	TV series, 10 episodes
1995–1997	Spellbinder	Josie	TV miniseries, 5 episodes
1995–1996	G.P.	Vesna Kapek	TV series, seasons 7–8, 23 episodes
1995–2005	Cheez TV	Host	TV series
1997	Medivac	Nikki Kershaw	TV series, season 2, 3 episodes
1998	Wildside	Jasmine Yakabovich	TV series, season 1, episode 11
2000	Above the Law	Dee Anne Williams	TV series, season 1, 5 ep
2000	Murder Call	Lily Aureli	TV series, season 3, episode 15: "Last Act"
2001	All Saints	Erin Shanahan	TV series, season 4, episode 19: "Can You Hear Me?"
2001	Head Start	Lucy Swain	TV miniseries, 5 episodes
2005	The Alice	Sally Fleming	TV miniseries, 2 episodes

=== Theatre ===
Sources are adapted from AusStage.

Year	Title	Notes
1993	The Garden of Granddaughters	Wharf Theatre, Sydney, with Playbox Theatre Company & STC
2002	Blue Window	Darlinghurst Theatre, Sydney
2002	Progress	Old Fitzroy Theatre, Sydney, with Cabin Crew Theatre
2004	Tales from the Arabian Nights	Laycock Street Theatre, Gosford with Kim Carpenter's Theatre of Image

== Discography ==
- Lenka (2008)
- Two (2011)
- Shadows (2013)
- The Bright Side (2015)
- Attune (2017)
- Intraspectral (2023)
- Good Days (2026)
