= Trouble Is a Friend =

Single by Lenka

from the album Lenka
- Released: 1 September 2009
- Recorded: 2008
- Genre: Pop
- Length: 3:35
- Label: Epic
- Songwriter(s): Thomas Salter; Lenka Kripac
- Producer(s): Mike Elizondo

Lenka singles chronology
| "The Show" (2008) | "Trouble Is a Friend" (2009) | "Heart Skips a Beat" (2011) |

Music videos
- "Trouble Is a Friend" on YouTube
- "Trouble Is a Friend (Spike Stent Remix)" on YouTube

"Trouble Is a Friend" is a song by Australian recording artist and actress Lenka from her debut studio album, Lenka (2008). It was released on 1 September 2009 as the album's second and final single. The song was written by Thomas Salter and Lenka. It was used in an episode from the fifth season of the popular medical drama Grey's Anatomy, teen drama television series 90210 and in the 2010 film Easy A.

== Music video ==
The official music video for "Trouble Is a Friend" (Note: The song included in the music video is Spike Stent Remix of the song.) shows Lenka making her way towards the screen. As the video progresses, her dresses and the backgrounds start to change in the verses. At times Lenka interacts with the newly found backgrounds and illustrations. The music video ends with the camera closing up on Lenka then fading out to a dark screen.

Original video, made by Lenka and James Gulliver Hancock, is a shadow figure production that follows a girl and her trouble, in the form of a dragon. The video ends with the girl getting into a hot air balloon and suffering a terrible fate.

== Live performances ==
Lenka performed the song on the 3 May 2013 episode of X Factor Indonesia.

== Track listing ==
1. "Trouble Is a Friend (Spike Stent Remix)" – 3:29

== Charts ==
| Chart (2009) | Peak position |
|---|---|
| German Singles Chart | 65 |
| Norwegian Singles Chart | 10 |

== "Selos" cover controversy ==
In 2024, Filipino singer Shaira released a song titled "Selos". However, it was discovered that "Selos" used the melody from Lenka's "Trouble Is a Friend". Despite having different lyrics in Tagalog, the unauthorized use of Lenka's melody raised copyright concerns. As a result, Shaira's song was voluntarily removed from streaming platforms on March 19, 2024. Shaira's recording label, AHS Channel, acknowledged the infringement and worked on securing a cover license for "Selos". They expressed their apologies to Lenka and thanked those who enjoyed Shaira's cover song.
