= Stageit =

Stageit.com
- Website type: Online performance venue
- Owner: Evan Lowenstein
- Website: www.stageit.com
- Commercial: Yes
- Launched: March 2011; 15 years ago
- Current status: Online

Stageit is a web-based performance venue headquartered in Hollywood, California. It hosts paid performances by musical artists who perform live via webcam. The performances are not archived or duplicated for distribution.

== Stageit currency ==
To purchase tickets to Stageit performances, or to tip, users must first purchase Stageit's currency, called "notes." One Stageit "note" is equivalent to ten cents. The performing artist decides how many notes a performance will cost.

== Live performances ==
Once a user purchases a ticket to a Stageit performance, they can join other audience members awaiting showtime in an online chat, which continues during the performance itself. Performances times and rates are set by artists. Performances on Stageit can last for up to thirty minutes. At the end of that time, artists are given the option to perform an additional twenty-minute encore set.

== Notable artists ==
Notable Stageit artists include:

- Jimmy Buffett
- Sara Bareilles
- Indigo Girls
- Tom Morello
- Jason Mraz
- Bonnie Raitt
- Blood on the Dance Floor
- Art Smith
- Jake Owen
- John Oates
- Hawthorne Heights
- Jordan Rudess
- Matt Nathanson
- Terry Bozzio
- Lee DeWyze
- Kottonmouth Kings
- Better Than Ezra
- Ryan Cabrera
- David Banner
- Jay Sean
- Kris Allen
- Joshua Radin
- Trey Songz
- Rick Springfield
- Plain White T's
- Debbie Gibson
- Korn
- Lisa Loeb
- Bowling For Soup
- Howie D
- Pomplamoose
- Tiffany Alvord
- Lacuna Coil
- Mayday Parade
- Less Than Jake
- Stryper
- The Ready Set
- Bob Schneider
- Tyler Ward
- Tyler Hilton
- Kane
- Justin Furstenfeld

== See also ==
- Spreecast
