= Lenka (album) =

Studio album by Lenka
- Released: 23 September 2008
- Recorded: 2008
- Studios: Wildsky (Montreal, Quebec); Phantom (Westlake Village, California); The Village (West Los Angeles, California); Ki Dorado (Burbank, California)
- Length: 38:42
- Label: Epic
- Producers: John Alagía; Mike Elizondo; Pierre Marchand; Stuart Brawley; Jason Lader

Lenka chronology
Lenka (2008)	Two (2011)

Singles from Lenka
- 1. "The Show" Released: 6 September 2008; 2. "Trouble Is a Friend" Released: 1 September 2009

Lenka is the debut studio album by Australian recording artist Lenka. It was released on 23 September 2008 by Epic Records. Produced by John Alagía, Mike Elizondo, Pierre Marchand, Stuart Brawley, and Jason Lader, it topped the Billboard Heatseekers and Pacific & South Atlantic charts.

The album's lead single, "The Show", was moderately successful, peaking at number 25 on the Billboard Adult Pop Songs chart. The second single, "Trouble Is a Friend", had less success, reaching number 65 on the German Singles Chart. AllMusic's Andrew Leahey praised Lenka as one of 2008's strongest newcomers, highlighting her vocal ability, songwriting, and catchy melodies, while noting the album's playful yet polished nature.

== Singles ==
"The Show" was released to digital retailers on 6 September 2008 as the album's lead single, and released on 15 June 2009 officially. The song had moderate success, peaking at number 25 on the US Billboard Adult Pop Songs chart, and at number 65 on the ARIA Singles Chart in Australia. "Trouble Is a Friend" was released to digital retailers as the album's second and final single on 1 September 2009. It failed to match the success of its predecessor, peaking at number 65 on the German Singles Chart.

== Composition ==
Lenka is enriched by a varied instrumental palette, with horns, cellos, violas, keyboards, and vibraphones given "equal space", resulting in a sound that feels both lush and bubbly. Lyrically, the album leans toward simple, universal reflections, sometimes downbeat observations such as the contemplative tone of "The Show" and the self-questioning mood of "Everything I'm Not". According to BBC, the lyrics focus on Lenka as a "bemused young lady in today's fast moving world", which emphasizes everyday imagery and affirmations rather than "any great revelations" with recurring references to a "big bad world" and statements of personal identity.

=== Music and lyrics ===
The albums opener "The Show" is described as "relentlessly cheerful" song that brims with "cleverly crafted hooks", with Lenka's internal rhymes and playful delivery helping the songs register as "pure radio gold". "Bring Me Down" incorporates more sassy in tone, as it opens with a "choir of Lenkas" and features a "badly whistled interlude" likened to Noah and the Whale's "5 Years Time". "Skipalong" contains a "nursery rhyme appeal" paired with an "almost Britpoppy melody", complementing its carefree lyrical tone. "Don't Let Me Fall" is noted for Lenka's "breathy sighs", and sets Lenka's "fragile voice" against a marching-band tempo. "Trouble Is a Friend" features "thrumming piano motif" that functions as a menacing undertow beneath the song's pop structure, and is noted for verses that are "brooding enough to engage you fully". "Like a Song", characterized as "tiny and tender", features "quiet piano chords and a sparse trumpet riff" and elevates Lenka "from being a cute girly singer to an actual artist", described as "drumless and expansive" with an "expectant stillness" created by vibes, synthetic strings, and oboe supporting a French-styled melody. It also illustrates how Lenka "still shines when the thick instrumental padding is stripped away".

== Critical reception ==
Professional ratings
Review scores
Source	Rating
AllMusic	4/5 stars
The Daily Telegraph	2/5 stars
Digital Spy	2/5 stars
Entertainment Weekly	B
The Guardian	3/5 stars
MusicOMH	2/5 stars

Lenka received generally mixed reviews from music critics. In the positive reviews, AllMusic review by Andrew Leahey highlights Lenka's debut album as a standout in 2008, calling her one of the year's strongest newcomers. BBC Music described the record's lyrics as light and observational rather than revelatory, often built around simple affirmations such as "I will always be me". While noting its strong "radio friendliness", they suggested that the album's persistent sweetness could feel cloying over a full listen, even as it hinted at "plenty of promise" beneath the surface. Caroline Sullivan's review for The Guardian highlights that while Lenka's solo debut doesn't fully set her apart from other breathy-voiced chanteuses like Sia and Jem, it leans more toward pop than they do.

In the negative reviews, Mayer Nissim of Digital Spy described the album as "assured, expensive and well put together" but felt that it faltered in its songwriting, lacking the "quirky charm" needed to stand out. John Murphy of MusicOMH also argued that the songs were "not strong enough to stretch over an album", ultimately calling the record "too bland and stodgy to hold any lasting appeal".

== Commercial performance ==
Lenka peaked at number 4 on the Polish Albums chart, while reaching number 30 in Austria, number 48 in Switzerland, and number 58 on the UK Albums Chart. In the United States, it entered the Billboard 200 at number 142. In Heatseekers chart, it peaked at number 3 overall and reached the top position in the Pacific and South Atlantic regional Heatseekers charts.

== Track listing ==
Lenka – standard edition
No.	Title	Writer(s)	Producer(s)	Length
1.	"The Show"	Lenka Kripac; Jason Reeves	Stuart Brawley	3:56
2.	"Bring Me Down"	Kripac; Brawley	Stuart Brawley	3:29
3.	"Skipalong"	Kripac; Michael Farrell	Pierre Marchand	3:53
4.	"Don't Let Me Fall"	Kripac; Thomas "Tawgs" Salter	Mike Elizondo	2:51
5.	"Anything I'm Not"	Kripac	Marchand	3:18
6.	"Knock Knock"	Kripac; Kevin Griffin	John Alagía	3:41
7.	"Dangerous and Sweet"	Kripac; Daniel Burns; Billy Mohler	Elizondo	3:32
8.	"Trouble Is a Friend"	Kripac; Salter	Elizondo	3:36
9.	"Live Like You're Dying"	Kripac	Jason Lader	3:49
10.	"Like a Song"	Kripac	Marchand	3:20
11.	"We Will Not Grow Old"	Kripac; Burns; Mohler	Elizondo	3:18
Total length:				38:42

Lenka – iTunes Store edition
No.	Title	Writer(s)	Producer(s)	Length
12.	"Force of Nature"	Lenka Kripac; Wally Gagel; Xandy Barry	Mike Elizondo	3:33
Total length:				42:15

Lenka – expanded edition
No.	Title	Writer(s)	Length
13.	"Trouble Is a Friend" (acoustic version)	Thomas "Tawgs" Salter; Lenka Kripac	3:43
14.	"Gravity Rides Everything" (Woodstock Session version)	Vivian Green; Buddy Broc; Eric Judy	3:52
15.	"Anything I'm Not" (Woodstock Session version)	Kripac	3:39
16.	"Vincent O'Brien" (Woodstock Session version)	Matthew Ward	2:49
17.	"We Will Not Grow Old" (Woodstock Session version)	Kripac; Billy Mohler; Dylan Burns	3:29
Total length:			58:27

== Credits and personnel ==
Credits were adapted from Barnes & Noble.

=== Recording locations ===
- Wildsky Studio; Montreal, Quebec (3, 5, 10)
- Phantom Studios; Westlake Village, California (4, 7, 8, 11)
- The Village; West Los Angeles, California (6)
- Ki Dorado Recording Studios; Burbank, California (9)

=== Performance credits ===
- Lenka - Primary Artist, Percussion (3, 5), Piano (1, 8, 10–11), Glockenspiel (3), Keyboards (7–8), Vocals (1–11), Vibes, Vibraphone (10)
- Keith Ciancia - Drums, Keyboards
- Luis Conte - Percussion (8)
- Larry Corbett - Cello (4)
- Joel Derouin - Strings, Violin
- Armen Garabedian - Violin (4)
- Mark Goldenberg - Bass (6)
- Victor Indrizzo - Drums (9)
- Roland Kato - Viola (4)
- Trevor Lawrence - Drums (8, 11)
- Danny Levin - Trombone (1–2), Trumpet (1–2, 7–8), Vocals (1)
- Pierre Marchand - Bass (10), Accordion (10)
- Josefina Vergara - Violin (4)
- John Alagia - Acoustic Guitar (6)
- Sean Hurley - Bass (1–2)
- Joey Waronker - Drums (7)
- Stuart Brawley - Organ (1–2), Piano (1–2), Keyboards (2), Vocals (1), Bells (1–2), Timpani (2), Vibes (1)
- Mike Elizondo - Acoustic Guitar (7), Bass (4, 7–8, 11), Electric Guitar (7–8, 11), Keyboards (7), Mellotron (8), Vibes (8)
- Maxime St-Pierre - Horn
- Joe Corcoran - Guitar (1–2), Percussion (2), Vocals (1), Moog Synthesizer (2)

- Zac Rae - Piano (4), Keyboards (4, 6–8)
- Howie Day - Vocals (7), Guest Appearance (7)
- Paz Lenchantin - Violin (9)
- Philip Vaiman - Violin (4)
- Adam MacDougall - Piano (9), Keyboards (9)
- Ana Lenchantin - Cello (9)
- Missy Higgins - Vocals (1)
- Lester Nuby - Drums (1–2)
- Tereza Stanislav - Strings, Violin (4)
- Jason Reeves - Vocals (1)
- Aaron Sterling - Drums (4)
- Pascal Shefteshy - Guitar (10)
- Wes Precourt - Violin (9)
- Mario de León - Violin (4), Concert Master
- Matthew Funes - Viola (4)
- Dan Rothschild - Bass (9)
- James Gulliver Hancock - Vocals (1)
- Dave Kostiner - Vocals (1)
- Jean Philippe Goncalves - Drums (3, 5)
- Maxime Saint Pierre - Trumpet (10), Horn (3, 5)
- Dan Thouin - Organ (3, 5), Piano (3, 5)
- Brian Macleod - Drums (6)
- Keefus Ciancia - Keyboards (7–8, 11)
- Francois Plante - Bass (3, 5)

=== Technical credits ===
- Dan Burns - Composer (7, 11)
- Greg Calbi - Mastering (1)
- Ted Jensen - Mastering
- Pierre Marchand - Producer (3, 5, 10), Engineer (3, 5, 10), Audio Production
- Brian Scheuble - Engineer (6), Mixing Engineer (6)
- John Alagia - Producer (6), Audio Production, Mixing Engineer (6)
- Suzie Katayama - String Contractor (4)
- Stuart Brawley - Arranger, Composer (2), Producer (1–2), Engineer, Horn Arrangements (1), Audio Production
- Mike Elizondo - Programming (4, 7–8, 11), Producer (4, 7–8, 11), Audio Production
- Pierre Girard - Engineer (3, 5, 10)
- Nicole Harding - Production Coordinator (1–2)
- Shari Sutcliffe - Production Coordinator (1–2)
- Kevin Salem - Mixing Engineer (3, 5)
- Brad Conrad - Assistant Engineer (6)

- Joe Corcoran - Programming (1), Engineer (1–2)
- Billy Mohler - Composer (7, 11)
- Jason Lader - Producer (9), Engineer (9), Audio Production
- Jason Reeves - Composer (1)
- Thomas Salter - Composer (4, 8)
- Sheri Lee - Art Direction
- Pascal Shefteshy - Engineer (3, 5, 10)
- David Paul Campbell - String Arrangements (4)
- Lenka - Composer (1–11)
- David Campbell - Arranger
- Fiona Brawley - Assistant Engineer (1–2)
- John Hanes - Mixing Engineer (2, 4, 7–8, 11)
- Serban Ghenea - Mixing Engineer (2, 4, 7–8, 11)
- Tim Roberts - Assistant Engineer (2, 4, 7–8, 11)
- Michael Farrell - Composer (3)
- Joel Derouin - Concert Master (4)
- Kevin Griffin - Composer (6)

== Charts ==
Chart	Peak position
Austrian Albums (Ö3 Austria)	30
Polish Albums (ZPAV)	4
South Korean International Albums (Circle)	98
Swiss Albums (Schweizer Hitparade)	48
UK Albums (Official Charts)	58
US Billboard 200	142
US Heatseekers (Billboard)	3

== Certifications ==
Region	Certification	Certified units/sales
Poland (ZPAV)	Gold	10,000^{*}
^{*} Sales figures based on certification alone.
