= Decoder Ring =

Australian rock band

- Origin: Sydney, New South Wales, Australia
- Genres: Electronica; post-rock; experimental rock; alternative rock
- Years active: 2001–present
- Labels: Hello Cleveland!; NO; Inertia; Bella Union
- Members: Matt Fitzgerald; Pete Kelly; Xavier Fijac; Matthew Steffen; Simon Killalea
- Past members: Tim Bruniges; Kenny Davis Jr; Ben Ely; Geoff Towner; Lenka Kripac; Tom Schutzinger

Decoder Ring are an Australian experimental electronic-rock crossover band from Australia.

== History ==
Decoder Ring was formed in 2001, in Sydney. The original line-up consisted of Tom Schutzinger (Keyboards, drums), Geoff Towner (bass, El Mopa), Pete Kelly (guitar, Sea Life Park), Kenny Davis Jr (keyboards, piano, The Jackson Code, The Blackeyed Susans) & Matt Fitzgerald (keyboards, guitar). This line-up recorded the EP Spooky Action at a Distance (2002) and the album Decoder Ring (2002). Geoff Towner departed in 2003 and was replaced by Ben Ely (Regurgitator).

The track "Night Shift" from Spooky Action at a Distance, featuring vocals by Jodi Phillis (Clouds), was featured in the soundtrack to the Alex Proyas film Garage Days (2002).

The band wrote the soundtrack for the 2004 Australian film Somersault, for which they won an AFI Award for 'Best Original Music Score', an Australian Screen Sound Guild Award for 'Soundtrack of the Year', a Lexus IF (Inside Film) Award for 'Best Music', 'Best Original Song Composed for a Feature Film, Telemovie, TV Series or Mini-Series' at the APRA/Australian Screen Music Awards, a Jackson Hole Film Festival Award for 'Best Score' and was nominated for an ARIA Award in the category of 'Best Soundtrack/Cast/Show Recording'.

Kenny Davis Jr & Ben Ely departed after the recording of Somersault in 2004, the band subsequently reconfiguring with new members Lenka (vocals, keyboards), Xavier Fijac (keyboards, samples) & Matthew Steffen (bass, [la Huva]).

The band wrote the soundtrack for the 2005 short feature Jewboy by writer/director Tony Krawitz, which was presented in 2006 at the Sundance Film Festival. All the band's performances are accompanied by film projections put on by Simon Killalea who, while not playing an instrument, is considered a member of the band. Both of the films were shown at the Cannes Film Festival.

2005 saw the release of the band's third full-length album Fractions, as well as performances at Homebake, the Big Day Out concerts, Splendour in the Grass, Cockatoo Island Festival and the Perth International Arts Festival.

In March 2006 Decoder Ring performed at the St Jerome's Laneway Festival in Sydney. A US tour saw them play shows in Los Angeles and New York City, as well as at the SXSW music festival in Austin, Texas. Upon their return home they played at The Great Escape Festival and Splendour in the Grass, as well as completing a national tour of Australia.

In 2007 a short film by Stephen Lance, Yolk, with music by Decoder Ring was screened as part of the Sydney Film Festival.

Recently 'Decoder Ring's remix of the song "Yama Yama" featured on an Australian Television advertisement for Tooheys Extra Dry beer. The song is adapted from Le Monde Fabuleux Des Yamasuki, a pseudo-Japanese concept album produced by French duo Jean Kluger and Daniel Vangarde (also known as The Yamasuki Singers) in 1972.

In 2009 Tom Schutzinger, key songwriter and founding member departed from the band.

== Discography ==
=== Albums ===
List of albums, with Australian chart positions
Title	Album details	Peak chart positions
Title	Album details	AUS
Decoder Ring	Released: 2002; Format: CD; Label: Hello Cleveland! (TAP002)	-
Somersault (Original Motion Picture Soundtrack)	Released: 2004; Format: CD; Label: Mana Soundtracks (20021)	-
Fractions	Released: September 2005; Format: CD; Label: NO Records (NN001)	80
They Blind the Stars, And the Wild Team	Released: 2009; Format: 2×CD; Label: Inertia Recordings (IR5228CD)	-

=== Extended plays ===
List of EPs, with selected details
Title	Details
Spooky Action at a Distance	Released: 2002; Format: CD; Label: Hello Cleveland! (TAP001)

== Awards and nominations ==
=== AIR Awards ===
The Australian Independent Record Awards (commonly known informally as AIR Awards) is an annual awards night to recognise, promote and celebrate the success of Australia's Independent Music sector.

Year	Nominee / work	Award	Result
2009	They Blind the Stars, and the Wild Team	Best Independent Album	Nominated

=== ARIA Music Awards ===
The ARIA Music Awards is an annual awards ceremony that recognises excellence, innovation, and achievement across all genres of Australian music. They commenced in 1987.

Year	Nominee / work	Award	Result	Ref.
2004	Somersault	Best Original Cast or Show Album	Nominated	
