= The Show (Lenka song) =

Single by Lenka

from the album Lenka
- Released: 6 September 2008
- Recorded: 2008
- Studio: The Backyard Studios (Los Angeles, California)
- Length: 3:55
- Label: Epic
- Songwriters: Jason Reeves; Lenka Kripac
- Producer: Stuart Brawley

Lenka singles chronology
"The Show" (2008)	"Trouble Is a Friend" (2009)

Music video
- "The Show (New Version)" on YouTube

"The Show" is the debut single by the Australian singer-songwriter Lenka, produced by Stuart Brawley. It was released on 6 September 2008. The song is on her first album, Lenka, released in October 2008. It was promoted as an iTunes Free Single of the Week.

== Track listing ==
1. "The Show" (Album Version) – 3:55
2. "Gravity Rides Everything" (The Woodstock Sessions) – 3:49

== Music video ==
The music video has Lenka sitting on a bench in a park singing her song and picking petals from a flower. She then flies to the next scene, where she is riding a bus and looking at the other people, including an old lady and a man who she notices is staring at her. She then flies to a photo shop, where she looks at a picture with her friends. There is also a scene in which she plays tennis without ever hitting the ball. The next scene is when she is riding a bicycle with grocery items. While she is riding the bike, she notices that people are dancing while she sings the second verse. Then she flies to a concert, where she sings the chorus and flies off to a restaurant, where she and the man from the bus are eating. The man notices that Lenka's food was sliced by an unseen object. She then goes to her house, in which her toothbrush brushes her teeth without her holding it, and she slowly goes to bed. She finishes by watching the TV (where everyone is singing her song along with her) and turning out the lights.

== Media use ==
It was used as the soundtrack for a 2008 Old Navy commercial, as an Ugly Betty season 3 2008 promo, in the 2008 film Angus, Thongs and Perfect Snogging, for the 2009 spring campaign of the Polish TV station TVN, in a 2009 commercial for the Malaysian telecommunications company TM, and in a 2010 commercial for the French insurance company GMF. Samples from the song were used in DFS sofa commercials in the UK. The song was covered by Kerris Dorsey in the 2011 movie Moneyball (set in 2002) and appears on its soundtrack. In addition, it was featured in the Korean television show My Love from the Star. In 2019, Japanese group Momoiro Cover Z covered the song with some new and original lyrics.

== Charts ==
=== Weekly charts ===
Chart (2008–09)	Peak position
Australia (ARIA)	65
Austria (Ö3 Austria Top 40)	13
Belgium (Ultratip Bubbling Under Flanders)	4
Czech Republic Airplay (ČNS IFPI)	35
Germany (GfK)	23
Switzerland (Schweizer Hitparade)	21
UK Singles (OCC)	22
US Adult Pop Airplay (Billboard)	25

=== Year-end charts ===
Chart (2009)	Position
Austria (Ö3 Austria Top 40)	73

== Sales ==
Region	Certification	Certified units/sales
South Korea (Gaon)	—	98,959

== Release history ==
"The Show" release history
Region	Date	Label	Format(s)	Catalog	Ref.
Australia	6 September 2008	Epic Records	Digital download	88697412892	
Australia	17 November 2008	Epic Records	CD single	88697412892	
