= Wendy Matthews discography =

- Studio albums: 9
- Soundtrack albums: 3
- Live albums: 2
- Compilation albums: 2
- Singles: 24
- Video albums: 4

Wendy Matthews is a Canadian-born Australian adult contemporary singer and songwriter. Her discography consists of nine studio albums, two live albums, two compilation albums, four video albums and twenty-four singles.

Matthews started recording as a session and jingles singer in Los Angeles in 1981, one of her early vocals was for "Willow Pattern" which appeared on Osamu Kitajima's album Dragon King in 1982. Further session work was followed by touring Australia with Glenn Shorrock (ex-Little River Band) into 1983. Matthews relocated to Sydney and continued her session work and joined bands including Models in 1985, Rockmelons in 1988 and Absent Friends in 1989. Matthews also supplied vocals for Australian Broadcasting Corporation (ABC) TV series, Dancing Daze (1986), she supplied lead vocals on four tracks for the related soundtrack, Dancing Daze – Rock and three singles, "Dancing Daze" (duet with Jenny Morris), "Dare to Be Bold" and "Might Have Been" (trio with Morris and Mark Williams). A second ABC TV series was Stringer (1987), where Matthews and Kate Ceberano released a duet album, You've Always Got the Blues – Songs from the ABC TV Series "Stringer" in 1988. The album peaked in the Top 10 on the Australian Kent Music Report Albums Chart.

Matthews released her debut solo studio album Émigré in 1990, which peaked at No. 11 on the ARIA Albums Chart.

== Albums ==
=== Studio albums ===
Title	Details	Peak chart positions	Certifications (sales thresholds)
Title	Details	AUS	Certifications (sales thresholds)
Émigré	Released: November 1990; Label: RooART (846 649-2); Formats: CD, cassette	11	ARIA: Platinum
Lily	Released: 28 September 1992; Label: RooArt (4509905472); Formats: CD, cassette	2	ARIA: 3× Platinum
The Witness Tree	Released: 14 November 1994; Label: RooArt (4509983912); Formats: CD, cassette	16	ARIA: Platinum
Ghosts	Released: 25 August 1997; Label: BMG Australia (74321510092); Formats: CD, cassette	43	
Beautiful View	Released: 17 July 2001; Label: BMG Australia (74321861512); Formats: CD	36	
Café Naturale	Released: 31 May 2004; Label: BMG Australia (82876617202); Formats: CD, digital download	42	
She	Released: 8 November 2008; Label: Barking Bear/MGM (9324690032587); Formats: CD, digital download	—	
The Welcome Fire	Released: 13 August 2013; Label: Ambition Entertainment/EMI Australia; Formats: CD, digital download	31	
Billie and Me: The White Room Sessions	Released: 27 July 2015; Label: Barking Bear; Formats: CD	—	
"—" denotes releases that did not chart.

=== As featured artist albums ===
Title	Details
Awakening (Hiroshi Sato featuring Wendy Matthews)	Released: 1982 (Japan); Label: Alfa (ALC-28035); Formats: CD, cassette

=== Live albums ===
Title	Details	Peak chart positions
Title	Details	AUS
The Way It Has to Be	Released: October 1991; Label: RooART (510 408-2); Formats: CD, cassette	102
Live at Mudgee RSL '91 and Bunnamah Estate '94	Released: 7 May 2021; Label: Black Box Records/ MGM Distribution; Formats: CD (limited), digital	—

=== Soundtracks ===
Title	Details	Peak chart positions	Certifications (sales thresholds)
Title	Details	AUS	Certifications (sales thresholds)
Dancing Daze (by Jenny Morris, Wendy Matthews, Mark Williams, Marc Hunter & Jane Clifton)	Released: February 1986; Label: ABC Music (RML 53191); Formats: LP, Cassette	—	
Illusion (by Mark Williams, Wendy Matthews, Martin Armiger & Peter Blakeley)	Released: 1986; Label: ABC Music (L 38529); Formats: LP	—	
You've Always Got the Blues – Songs from the ABC TV Series "Stringer" (with Kate Ceberano)	Released: April 1988; Label: ABC Music (L 38863); Formats: CD, cassette	7	ARIA: Platinum
"—" denotes releases that did not chart.

=== Compilation albums ===
Title	Details	Peak chart positions	Certifications (sales thresholds)
Title	Details	AUS	Certifications (sales thresholds)
Stepping Stones: The Best of Wendy Matthews	Released: 15 March 1999; Label: BMG Australia (74321648252); Formats: CD, cassette	4	ARIA: Platinum
The Essential Wendy Matthews	Released: 2007; Label: Sony BMG (88697120052); Formats: CD, digital download	—	
"—" denotes releases that did not chart.

=== Video albums ===
Year	Details
Live at the Sydney Opera House	Released: 1994; Label: BMG Australia (1120811-4); Format: Video
Ghosts EPK	Released: 1998; Label: BMG Australia; Format: Video
Stepping Stones - Best of	Released: 1999; Label: BMG Australia (74321650202); Format: Video
Stepping Stones - Best of	Released: 2003; Label: BMG Australia (82876566769); Format: DVD

== Singles ==
List of singles as credited artist, with Australian chart positions and certifications
Year	Single	Peak chart positions	Album
Year	Single	AUS	Album
1986	"Dancing Daze" (with Jenny Morris)	—	Dancing Daze
1986	"Dare to Be Bold"	—	Dancing Daze
1986	"Might Have Been" (with Morris and Mark Williams)	—	Dancing Daze
1988	"You've Always Got the Blues" (with Kate Ceberano)	—	You've Always Got the Blues
1988	"Guilty (Through Neglect)" (with Ceberano)	—	You've Always Got the Blues
1988	"Jump" (Rockmelons featuring Wendy Matthews)	—	Tales of the City (Rockmelons album)
1990	"I Don't Want to Be with Nobody but You" (Absent Friends featuring Wendy Matthews)	4	Here's Looking Up Your Address (Absent Friends album)
1990	"Token Angels"	18	Émigré
1991	"Woman's Gotta Have It"	34	Émigré
1991	"Let's Kiss (Like Angels Do)"	14	Émigré
1992	"The Day You Went Away"	2	Lily
1993	"Friday's Child"	15	Lily
1993	"If Only I Could"	41	Lily
1993	"T.K.O."	118	Lily
1994	"Standing Strong"	37	The Witness Tree
1995	"Love Will Keep Me Alive"	68	The Witness Tree
1995	"Say a Prayer"	—	The Witness Tree
1997	"Then I Walked Away"	75	Ghosts
1997	"Big"	200	Ghosts
1998	"Beloved"	49	Ghosts
1999	"I've Got to Have You"	127	Stepping Stones
2000	"Day by Day"	200	Godspell (Australian Cast Recording)
2000	"Free"	131	Beautiful View
2001	"Beautiful View"	88	Beautiful View
2001	"Like the Sun"	195	Beautiful View
2008	"Fallen Angels"	—	She
2013	"Amelia"	—	The Welcome Fire
2013	"Keeping My Distance"	—	The Welcome Fire
2016	"F U Cancer" (with Catherine Britt with Kasey Chambers, Beccy Cole, Lyn Bowtell, Josh Pyke, Wes Carr & Wendy Matthews)	—	non-album single
2019	"Help Is on Its Way" (with Glenn Shorrock, The McClymonts, Beccy Cole, Jasmine Rae, Travis Collins, Busby Marou and Fanny Lumsden)	—	non-album single
"—" denotes releases that did not chart.

== Other appearances ==
Year	Song	Artist	Album
1982	"Willow Pattern"	Osamu Kitajima	Dragon King
1982	"Say Goodbye"	Hiroshi Sato	Awakening
1987	"Oh! Darling"	Models	Non-album single
1989	"Skye Boat Song"	various artists	Five
1989	"The Sound of the Wind"	various artists	Six
1989	"Golden Slumbers" (with Rick Price)	various artists	Zzzero
1989	"Hallelujah"	Absent Friends	Here's Looking Up Your Address
1990	"Hullabaloo"	Absent Friends	Here's Looking Up Your Address
1990	"Harmony"	Absent Friends	Here's Looking Up Your Address
1993	"Silent Night"	various artists	The Spirit of Christmas 1993
1998	"Here Am I"	various artists	Good Vibrations – A Concert for Marc Hunter – The Live Event
2000	"Pure Inspiration"	various artists	Olympic Record
2001	"White Christmas"	various artists	The Spirit of Christmas 2001
2009	"Day You Went Away"	Phrase	Clockwork
2009	"Easy"	Adam Harvey	Both Sides Now
2010	"Flower on the Water"	John Williamson	Absolute Greatest: 40 Years True Blue
2025	"Don't Think Twice, It's All Right"	Swanee	Believe
