= Peter Blakeley discography =

- Studio albums: 3
- Extended plays: 1
- Singles: 11

Peter Blakeley is an Australian adult contemporary singer and songwriter. Blakeley has released three solo albums and eleven singles.

Blakeley was a lead singer for Rockmelons in the mid-1980s and launched his solo career in 1987 and had a hit single in Australia in 1990 with "Crying in the Chapel" (not the 1950s song).

== Albums ==
=== Studio albums ===
Year	Title	Peak chart position				Sales and Certifications
Year	Title	AUS	NZL	US	GER	Sales and Certifications
1987	Vicious: Released: 1987; Formats: Cassette, vinyl	99	—	—	—	
1990	Harry's Café De Wheels: Released: 1990; Formats: Cassette, CD, vinyl	3	35	—	2	AUS: Platinum
1993	The Pale Horse: Released: 1993; Formats: Cassette, CD, vinyl	72	—	—	—	
"—" denotes releases that did not chart.

=== Soundtracks ===
Year	Title & Details
1986	Illusion (by Mark Williams, Wendy Matthews, Martin Armiger & Peter Blakeley): Released: 1986; Label: ABC Music (L 38529); Formats: LP

== Extended plays ==
Year	Title & Details
1988	Truetone Sessions (US only): Released: 1988; Formats: Cassette, CD, vinyl

== Singles ==
Year	Single	Peak chart positions				Album
Year	Single	AUS	NZL	US	GER	Album
1986	"Must Be Chemical"	—	—	—	—	Illusion
1986	"Ain't That Peculiar"	65	—	—	—	Vicious
1987	"Caterina"	—	—	—	—	Vicious
1987	"Bye Bye Baby"	—	—	—	—	Vicious
1988	"Cattletrain"	—	—	—	—	Vicious
1989	"Crying in the Chapel"	3	7	34	57	Harry's Cafe De Wheels
1990	"The First Time Ever I Saw Your Face"	17	—	—	—	Harry's Cafe De Wheels
1990	"Quicksand"	81	—	—	—	Harry's Cafe De Wheels
1990	"You Never Heard It from Me"	61	—	—	—	Harry's Cafe De Wheels
1993	"I've Been Lonely"	61	—	—	—	The Pale Horse
1994	"God's Little Elvis"	—	—	—	—	The Pale Horse
"—" denotes releases that did not chart.
