= ARIA Award for Breakthrough Artist – Album =

Former Australian music award

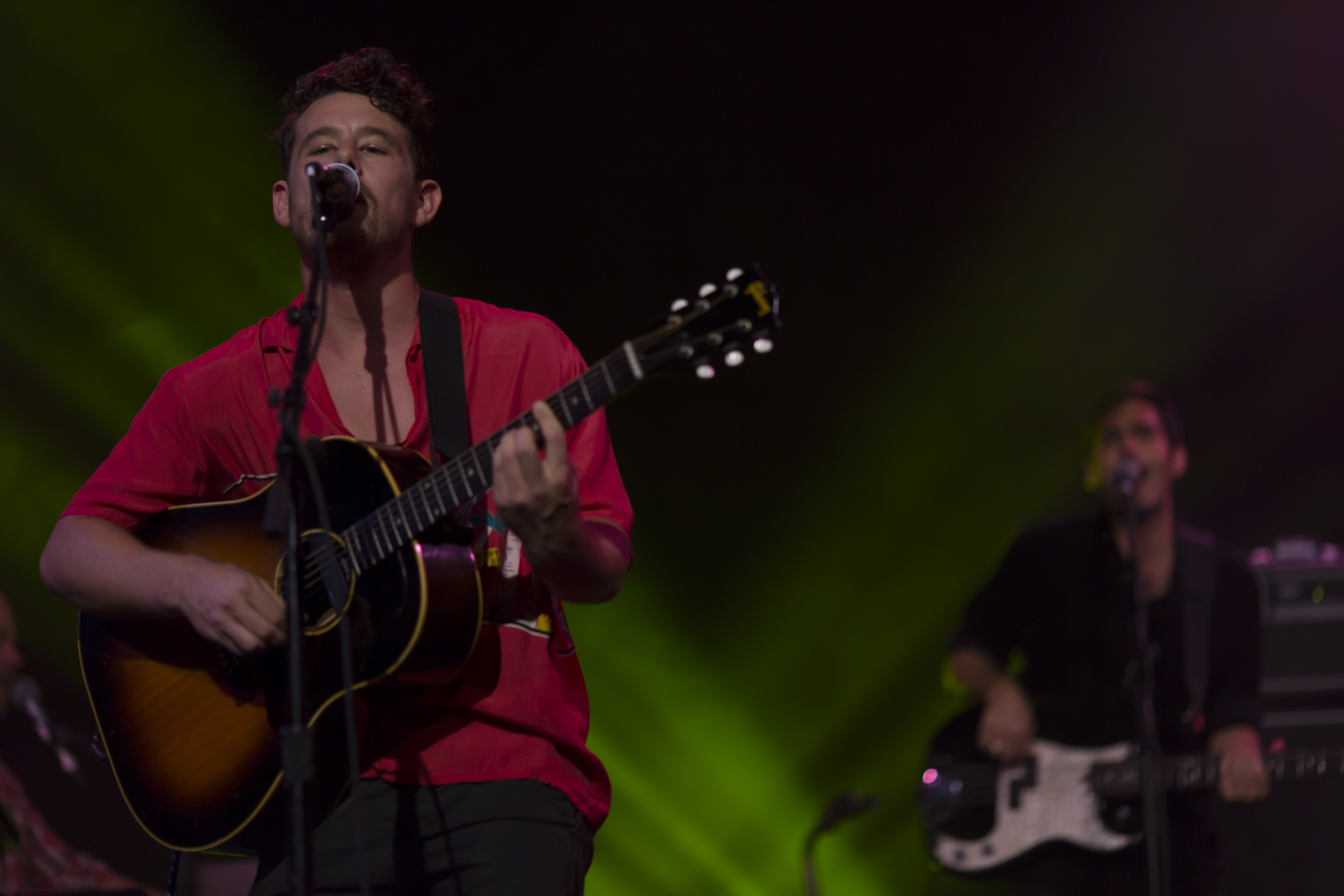
- 2011 winner Boy & Bear
- Country: Australia
- Presented by: Australian Recording Industry Association (ARIA)
- First award: 1989
- Final award: 2011
- Currently held by: Boy & Bear, Moonfire (2011)
- Website: www.ariaawards.com.au

The ARIA Music Award for Breakthrough Artist – Album is an award presented at the annual ARIA Music Awards, which recognises "the many achievements of Aussie artists across all music genres", since 1987. It is handed out by the Australian Recording Industry Association (ARIA), an organisation whose aim is "to advance the interests of the Australian record industry." The award is given to an Australian group or solo artist who has had an album appear in the ARIA Top 100 Albums Chart between the eligibility period, and is voted for by a judging academy, which comprises 1000 members from different areas of the music industry. However, "artists and groups are not eligible if they, or any member of the group, has previously been a final five (5) nominee in any ARIA Awards category with an album, or if they have been in a group that has previously been a final five (5) nominee with an album, or if they have had a previous Top 50 Album in the ARIA Album Chart."

The award for Breakthrough Artist – Album was first presented to 1927 and Rockmelons in 1989 for their albums ...Ish (1988) and Tales of the City (1988), respectively. Boy & Bear were the last act to receive the accolade in 2011 for their album Moonfire (2011). This award and the ARIA Award for Breakthrough Artist – Single were merged in 2012 to form a single award for Breakthrough Artist – Release.

== Winners and nominees ==
In the following table, the winner is highlighted in a separate colour, and in boldface; the nominees are those that are not highlighted or in boldface. All reliable sources used in this article make no mention of nominees prior to 1992.

Winner marked in a separate colour

Year	Winner(s)	Album Title
**1989** (3rd)	**1927**	**...Ish**
**1989** (3rd)	**Rockmelons**	**Tales of the City**
**1989** (3rd)	Catfish	Unlimited Address
**1989** (3rd)	Kylie Minogue	Kylie
**1989** (3rd)	Schnell Fenster	The Sound of Trees
**1990** (4th)	**Ian Moss**	**Matchbook**
**1990** (4th)	Gyan	Gyan
**1990** (4th)	Johnny Diesel & The Injectors	Johnny Diesel & The Injectors
**1990** (4th)	The Hummingbirds	loveBUZZ
**1990** (4th)	Max Q	Max Q
**1991** (5th)	**Margaret Urlich**	**Safety in Numbers**
**1991** (5th)	Absent Friends	Here's Looking Up Your Address
**1991** (5th)	Wendy Matthews	Émigré
**1991** (5th)	Archie Roach	Charcoal Lane
**1991** (5th)	Southern Sons	Southern Sons
**1992** (6th)
**1992** (6th)	**Baby Animals**	**Baby Animals**
**1992** (6th)	Clouds	Penny Century
**1992** (6th)	Deborah Conway	String of Pearls
**1992** (6th)	Richard Pleasance	Galleon
**1992** (6th)	Ratcat	Blind Love
**1993** (7th)
**1993** (7th)	**Frente!**	**Marvin the Album**
**1993** (7th)	Chris Wilson	Landlocked
**1993** (7th)	Company of Strangers	Company of Strangers
**1993** (7th)	The Dukes	Harbour City
**1993** (7th)	Rick Price	Heaven Knows
**1994** (8th)
**1994** (8th)	**The Badloves**	**Get On Board**
**1994** (8th)	Peter Andre	Peter Andre
**1994** (8th)	The Sharp	This Is the Sharp
**1994** (8th)	Things of Stone and Wood	The Yearning
**1994** (8th)	Tiddas	Sing About Life
**1995** (9th)
**1995** (9th)	**Silverchair**	**Frogstomp**
**1995** (9th)	Christine Anu	Stylin' Up
**1995** (9th)	D.I.G.	Dig Deeper
**1995** (9th)	Max Sharam	A Million Year Girl
**1995** (9th)	Vika and Linda	Vika and Linda
**1996** (10th)
**1996** (10th)	**Regurgitator**	**Tu-Plang**
**1996** (10th)	Ammonia	Mint 400
**1996** (10th)	Deni Hines	Imagination
**1996** (10th)	Merril Bainbridge	The Garden
**1996** (10th)	Pollyanna	Long Player
**1997** (11th)
**1997** (11th)	**Savage Garden**	**Savage Garden**
**1997** (11th)	The Earthmen	Love Walked In
**1997** (11th)	Human Nature	Telling Everybody
**1997** (11th)	Leonardo's Bride	Angel Blood
**1997** (11th)	Rebecca's Empire	Way of All Things
**1998** (12th)
**1998** (12th)	**Natalie Imbruglia**	**Left of the Middle**
**1998** (12th)	Cordrazine	From Here to Wherever
**1998** (12th)	Grinspoon	Guide to Better Living
**1998** (12th)	Jebediah	Slightly Odway
**1998** (12th)	The Superjesus	Sumo
**1999** (13th)
**1999** (13th)	**The Living End**	**The Living End**
**1999** (13th)	Bachelor Girl	Waiting for the Day
**1999** (13th)	Gerling	Children of Telepathic Experiences
**1999** (13th)	Marie Wilson	Real Life
**1999** (13th)	Not from There	Sand on Seven
**2000** (14th)
**2000** (14th)	**Killing Heidi**	**Reflector**
**2000** (14th)	Alex Lloyd	Black the Sun
**2000** (14th)	Sonic Animation	Orchid for the Afterworld
**2000** (14th)	Taxiride	Imaginate
**2000** (14th)	Vanessa Amorosi	The Power
**2001** (15th)
**2001** (15th)	**The Avalanches**	**Since I Left You**
**2001** (15th)	28 Days	Upstyledown
**2001** (15th)	Augie March	Sunset Studies
**2001** (15th)	John Butler Trio	Three
**2001** (15th)	Lo-Tel	Planet of the Stereos
**2002** (16th)
**2002** (16th)	**George**	**Polyserena**
**2002** (16th)	1200 Techniques	Choose One
**2002** (16th)	Dan Brodie and the Broken Arrows	Empty Arms, Broken Hearts
**2002** (16th)	Eskimo Joe	Girl
**2002** (16th)	The Vines	Highly Evolved
**2003** (17th)
**2003** (17th)	**Delta Goodrem**	**Innocent Eyes**
**2003** (17th)	Amiel	Audio Out
**2003** (17th)	Pete Murray	Feeler
**2003** (17th)	The Sleepy Jackson	Lovers
**2003** (17th)	The Waifs	Up All Night
**2004** (18th)
**2004** (18th)	**Jet**	**Get Born**
**2004** (18th)	The Cat Empire	The Cat Empire
**2004** (18th)	Dallas Crane	Dallas Crane
**2004** (18th)	Dan Kelly and the Alpha Males	Sing the Tabloid Blues
**2004** (18th)	Xavier Rudd	Solace
**2005** (19th)
**2005** (19th)	**Missy Higgins**	**The Sound of White**
**2005** (19th)	Evermore	Dreams
**2005** (19th)	Lior	Autumn Flow
**2005** (19th)	Little Birdy	BigBigLove
**2005** (19th)	Sarah Blasko	The Overture & the Underscore
**2006** (20th)
**2006** (20th)	**Wolfmother**	**Wolfmother**
**2006** (20th)	The Grates	Gravity Won't Get You High
**2006** (20th)	Hilltop Hoods	The Hard Road
**2006** (20th)	Rogue Traders	Here Come the Drums
**2006** (20th)	The Veronicas	The Secret Life Of...
**2007** (21st)
**2007** (21st)	**Sneaky Sound System**	**Sneaky Sound System**
**2007** (21st)	Airbourne	Runnin' Wild
**2007** (21st)	Expatriate	In the Midst of This
**2007** (21st)	Josh Pyke	Memories & Dust
**2007** (21st)	Kate Miller-Heidke	Little Eve
**2008** (22nd)
**2008** (22nd)	**Gabriella Cilmi**	**Lessons to Be Learned**
**2008** (22nd)	Angus & Julia Stone	A Book Like This
**2008** (22nd)	Midnight Juggernauts	Dystopia
**2008** (22nd)	Operator Please	Yes Yes Vindictive
**2008** (22nd)	Sam Sparro	Sam Sparro
**2009** (23rd)
**2009** (23rd)	**Ladyhawke**	**Ladyhawke**
**2009** (23rd)	Jessica Mauboy	Been Waiting
**2009** (23rd)	Lisa Mitchell	Wonder
**2009** (23rd)	Sia	Some People Have Real Problems^{[A]}
**2009** (23rd)	The Temper Trap	Conditions
**2010** (24th)
**2010** (24th)	No award given^{[B]}	
**2011** (25th)
**2011** (25th)	**Boy & Bear**	**Moonfire**
**2011** (25th)	Drapht	The Life of Riley
**2011** (25th)	Gypsy & The Cat	Gilgamesh
**2011** (25th)	Oh Mercy	Great Barrier Grief
**2011** (25th)	The Middle East	I Want That You Are Always Happy

== Notes ==
A: Despite the ARIA Awards website saying C. W. Stoneking was nominated for this award, the video for this award on the Official ARIA YouTube channel shows that Sia was nominated. This is the video: https://www.youtube.com/watch?v=DryNVmJ_AHs

B: In 2010, the Breakthrough Artist – Album award was merged with the Breakthrough Artist – Single accolade to form a sole award for Breakthrough Artist.
