= Derrick O'Connor =

Irish actor (1941–2018)

- Born: 3 January 1941; Dublin, Ireland
- Died: 29 June 2018 (aged 77); Santa Barbara, California, U.S.
- Education: East 15 Acting School
- Occupation: Actor
- Years active: 1968–2016
- Website: derrickoconnor.com

Derrick O'Connor (3 January 1941 – 29 June 2018) was an Irish actor, who worked extensively in the United Kingdom and the United States.

== Early life and education ==
O'Connor was born in Dublin in 1941, and raised there and in London, England. He trained at the East 15 Acting School in Essex.

== Career ==
=== Theatre ===
O'Connor first achieved prominence on stage in Edinburgh, thanks to his work with the Traverse Theatre and the Royal Lyceum Theatre. He starred in avant-garde plays by the likes of Stanley Eveling and Megan Terry. Under director Richard Eyre, he starred in productions of The Taming of the Shrew, The Caretaker, and Oh, What a Lovely War!. In London, he starred in The Merry-Go-Round at the Royal Court Theatre. He also starred in Moby-Dick (directed by Keith Johnstone), in Blood Sports opposite Simon Callow, and in Born Yesterday at the Royal Exchange, Manchester. He also performed with the Royal Shakespeare Company.

After moving to the United States, O'Connor directed and produced plays in San Francisco and Los Angeles.

=== Film and television ===
O'Connor was best known for his performance as South African mercenary Pieter Vorstedt in Lethal Weapon 2 and for his roles in three Terry Gilliam films. He also appeared as Jack Stone in the British police drama series The Professionals in the episode "You'll be Alright". Another role was that of Peter Morgan in the series Crown Court (1976). In 1980, he appeared as Ray Fox in the Thames TV series Fox.

Gilliam, who directed O'Connor in three films, had noted in his audio commentaries that O'Connor seemed to have a habit of relinquishing most of his dialogue in favour of physical character humour. Notable examples include Time Bandits, in which his character's dialogue was resorted to simple grunts while the Maid Marian character "translated" for him and in Brazil, in which O'Connor scrapped all of his character's dialogue and simply repeated the dialogue of Bob Hoskins' character.

In 1986, the BBC Scotland play Four of One by Gawn Grainger starred O'Connor along with Mark McManus, Derek Newark and Trevor Ray.

== Personal life ==
O'Connor married Mimi Suzanne Ploss in 1990. They had a son, Max, a filmmaker.

== Death ==
O'Connor died from pneumonia in Santa Barbara, on 29 June 2018, at the age of 77.

== Filmography ==
Year	Title	Role	Notes
1971	The Blood on Satan's Claw	Member of Mob Chasing Margaret	Uncredited
1973	The Final Programme	Frank	
1974	Butley	Irishman in pub	Uncredited
1977	Jabberwocky	Flying Hogfish Peasant	
1978	Sweeney 2	Llewelyn	
1978	On a Paving Stone Mounted		
1980	Fox	Ray Fox	TV series
1980	Bloody Kids	Detective Ritchie	TV movie
1980	Hawk the Slayer	Ralf	
1981	Time Bandits	Robber Leader	
1982	The Bell	Noel Spens	TV series
1982	The Missionary	Gym Trainer	
1984	Pope John Paul II	Swiacki	TV movie
1985	Brazil	Dowser	
1987	Hope and Glory	Mac	
1989	Lethal Weapon 2	Pieter Vorstedt	
1989	Dealers	Robby Barrell	
1993	Stark	Zimmerman	TV mini-series, 3 episodes
1994	Felidae	Mendel	(English dub)
1995	Ghosts	Jack Rudkin	Episode: " I'll Be Watching You"
1995	How to Make an American Quilt	Dean Reed	
1998	Deep Rising	Captain H.W. Atherton	
1999	End of Days	Thomas Aquinas	
2003	Daredevil	Father Everett	
2006	Pirates of the Caribbean: Dead Man's Chest	Very Old Man	
2006	Unrest	Walter Blackwell	
2007	The Blue Hour	Humphrey	
2014	Man from Reno	Stephen Luft	
2016	Pushing Dead	Sidewalk Salesman	

== Television ==
List of Derrick O'Connor television series credits
Year 1978	Title OUT	Role John pavey	Notes	Ref(s)
1982	The Professionals	Jack Stone	Episode: "You'll Be All Right"	
1988	Stringer	Frank Buchanan	Lead role	
1996	Tracey Takes On...	Kay's Father	Episode: "Death"	
2006	Monk	Inspector St. Clare	Episode: "Mr. Monk and the Big Reward"	
2009	EXIT Stage Left	Abe Baynor	Web series; 2 episodes	
