= Love Will Keep Us Alive =

1994 single by Eagles

Single by Eagles

from the album Hell Freezes Over
- Released: November 1994
- Length: 4:02
- Label: Geffen; Eagles Recording Company
- Songwriters: Jim Capaldi; Paul Carrack; Peter Vale
- Producers: Eagles; Elliot Scheiner; Rob Jacobs

Eagles singles chronology
"Get Over It" (1994)	"Love Will Keep Us Alive" (1994)	"Learn to Be Still" (1994)

"Love Will Keep Us Alive" is a song written by Jim Capaldi, Paul Carrack, and Peter Vale and recorded by American rock band the Eagles. It was first performed by the Eagles in 1994, during their Hell Freezes Over reunion tour, with lead vocals by bassist Timothy B. Schmit. This is the last single to feature Don Felder, who was terminated from the band in 2001. The song was nominated at the 38th Grammy Awards for Best Pop Performance by a Duo or Group with Vocals.

Although the song was never formally released as a single in the US, and thus was not eligible to appear on the US Billboard Hot 100 under the rules then in place, it spent three weeks at number one on the Billboard Adult Contemporary chart in early 1995 and reached number 22 on Billboard's Hot 100 Airplay chart. In the United Kingdom, "Love Will Keep Us Alive" was issued as a single and peaked at number 52 on the UK Singles Chart.

Aside from being on the album Hell Freezes Over, the song appears on the Eagles' box set Selected Works: 1972–1999 and their 2003 compilation album, The Very Best Of.

Paul Carrack recorded the song for his 1996 album, Blue Views; it also featured on his 2006 compilation album, Greatest Hits – The Story So Far. In 2011, Carrack and Schmit recorded the song in London with the Royal Philharmonic Orchestra and released it in the UK on the Carrack label.

== Background ==
According to the liner notes that accompanied their 2003 greatest hits CD, this song was written when Carrack, Capaldi, and Schmit were planning to form a new rock band with Don Felder and Max Carl during the late eighties or early nineties. The band had the working name of Malibu Men's Choir. This never materialized, so Schmit proposed the song for the Eagles' reunion album. According to Felder, they sent demo tapes to the Eagles manager, Irving Azoff, who rejected it as not good enough. Felder thought that it was ironic that the Eagles would later record one of those rejected songs.

== Personnel ==
- Glenn Frey – harmony and backing vocals, rhythm guitar
- Don Henley – harmony and backing vocals, drums
- Don Felder – slide guitar
- Joe Walsh – rhythm guitar
- Timothy B. Schmit – lead vocals, bass guitar

== Charts ==
=== Weekly charts ===
Weekly chart performance for "Love Will Keep Us Alive"
Chart (1994–1995)	Peak position
Canada Top Singles (RPM)	10
Canada Adult Contemporary (RPM)	11
US Radio Songs (Billboard)	22
US Adult Contemporary (Billboard)	1
US Adult Pop Airplay (Billboard)	37
US Pop Airplay (Billboard)	27

=== Year-end charts ===
Year-end chart performance for "Love Will Keep Us Alive"
Chart (1995)	Position
Canada Top Singles (RPM)	64
US Hot 100 Airplay (Billboard)	56
US Adult Contemporary (Billboard)	10

== Wendy Matthews' version ==
"Love Will Keep Me Alive"

Single by Wendy Matthews

from the album The Witness Tree
- Released: January 1995
- Length: 4:14
- Label: RooART
- Songwriters: Jim Capaldi; Paul Carrack; Peter Vale
- Producer: Booker T. Jones

Wendy Matthews singles chronology
"Standing Strong" (1994)	"Love Will Keep Me Alive" (1995)	"Say a Prayer" (1995)

Australian recording artist Wendy Matthews released a version of the song in January 1995, retitled as "Love Will Keep Me Alive" as the second single from her third studio album, The Witness Tree. The song peaked at number 68 on the ARIA Charts in April 1995

=== Track listing ===
1. "Love Will Keep Me Alive" - 4:14
2. "God Watch Over You" (Wash Over You Mix) - 7:04
3. "Remember My Forgotten Man" - 5:03

=== Charts ===
Chart (1995)	Peak position
Australia (ARIA)	68

== Other versions ==
"Love Will Keep Us Alive" was recorded by Capaldi and former Traffic bandmate Dave Mason on their 40,000 Headman tour and live album, and by Carrack (duet with Lindsay Dracass) on his 2007 album Old, New, Borrowed and Blue.

Terry Lin also covered this song on his 1999 compilation Love Singles.

Barry Darnell recorded a southern rock version on his 2018 release "Postcards From Tupelo" on Backyard Records in Macon, Georgia.

== See also ==
- List of Hot Adult Contemporary number ones of 1995
