= Bruno Dutot =

Australian painter

Bruno Dutot (born 19 October 1962) is a French-born Australian painter, known especially for his public mural of 'Oucha', a woman with a cat in Edgecliff, Sydney.

Born in Normandy, the youngest child of 8 siblings, Dutot trained at the École des Beaux-Arts, a fine arts school in Caen for 2 years.

Dutot emigrated to Australia in 1987 and promptly began infusing Sydney with French style by painting walls in various locations.

His artistic style has evolved from the red dress he used to draw in Paris to 'Rochelle', the elegant, stylised woman facing away from the viewer, with elongated, free-flowing arms, accompanied by a cat.

Rochelle is most famously displayed on the wall at the intersection of New South Head Road and Darling Point Road, Edgecliff. This iconic painting, best seen travelling East on New South Head Road, dates back to 1991 and has developed into a community project.

In 1993, Dutot was deported for overstaying his visa, but returned five years later. During this time, unbeknownst to him, other artists maintained the spirit of the artwork. Since his return, Dutot has regularly updated the wall with new themes and messages.

Dutot's public painting now holds cultural significance to many Sydneysiders. In an interview with Music Australia singer/songwriter Wendy Matthews summed it up: "Every time I come to the city I drive past her, see if she's changed. Sometimes she'll have a cat or be standing in snow. Though you never see her face, she's come to symbolise Sydney for me."

Paintings of Rochelle can now be found in art galleries around Sydney, usually with a variation of the title "Oucha".
