= Café Naturale =

Studio album by Wendy Matthews
- Released: 24 May 2004
- Recorded: 2003
- Studio: Tiger Studios in Sydney, Australia
- Genre: Pop
- Label: BMG
- Producer: Michael Szumowski

Wendy Matthews chronology
Beautiful View (2001)	Café Naturale (2004)	The Essential Wendy Matthews (2007)

Singles from Café Naturale
- 1. "All I Need" Released: April 2004

Café Naturale is the sixth studio album by singer Wendy Matthews, released by BMG in Australia on 24 May 2004. It is an album of cover songs chosen by Matthews and the album's producer, Michael Szumowski. The album yielded only one single, "All I Need".

In 2002, Matthews moved to a coastal haven outside Coffs Harbour, New South Wales. She spent a lot of time in her favourite cafe listening to records, and explains "there’s nothing like a song to bring you back to a specific moment or feeling in time." This led her to name the album Café Naturale.

She was surprised by some of the song choices. "Once we got into the studio the record started to reveal its personality to me. It all came together and the songs, these very melodic songs, started to make themselves known. It just worked."

The thought behind the album's cover artwork comes from a painting of a woman on a wall on Edgecliff Road in Sydney, Australia by Bruno Dutot in 1987. Matthews approached Dutot and she asked him to commission a painting of this woman for her cover. She states "basically, he's painted her as me with a chopstick in her hair and my dog at the feet. Every time I'm in Sydney I have to go and check the lady on the wall, what colour dress she's wearing this month, whether she's changed and she looks so cafe society to me, so I'm thrilled and honoured that he actually did a painting for this cover." Matthews says the painting has come to symbolise Sydney for her.

== Track listing ==
No.	Title	Writer(s)	Original artist	Length
1.	"All I Need"	Beth Hirsch	Air	4:20
2.	"Early Morning Rain"	Gordon Lightfoot	Ian & Sylvia	4:12
3.	"Love and Happiness"	Al Green	Al Green	3:43
4.	"Slave (Just for Love)"	Zekuumba Zekkariyas	Womack & Womack	5:03
5.	"Short Note"	Matt Moffitt	Matt Finish	4:03
6.	"This Time"	Tim Kellett, Robin Taylor-Firth	Olive	3:52
7.	"All That It Takes"	Ed Baden Powell, Steve Marston		2:53
8.	"Moon Beneath My Feet"	Naoise David Sheridan		3:41
9.	"A Kiss to Build a Dream On"	Oscar Hammerstein II, Bert Kalmar, Harry Ruby	Louis Armstrong	3:36
10.	"One"	Adam Clayton, David Evans, Paul Hewson, Larry Mullen	U2	4:33
11.	"Protection"	Grantley Marshall, Robert Del Naja, Tracey Thorn, Andrew Vowles	Massive Attack	4:36
12.	"The Wing and the Wheel"	Nanci Griffith	Nanci Griffith	3:16

== Charts ==
Chart (2004)	Peak position
Australian Albums (ARIA)	42
