= List of Hot Adult Contemporary number ones of 1995 =

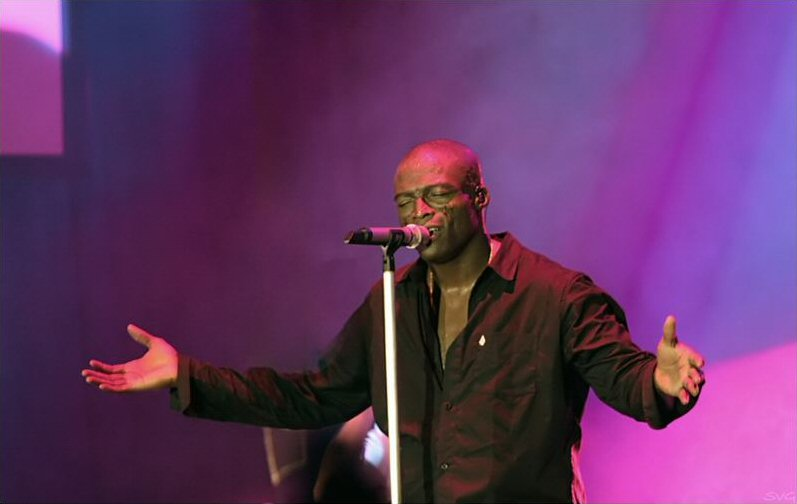
Seal spent 12 weeks at number one with his song "Kiss from a Rose".

In 1995, Billboard magazine published a chart ranking the top-performing songs in the United States in the adult contemporary music (AC) market. The chart, which in 1995 was published under the title Hot Adult Contemporary, has undergone various name changes during its history but has been published as Adult Contemporary since 1996. In 1995, 11 songs topped the chart, based on weekly airplay data from radio stations compiled by Nielsen Broadcast Data Systems.

On the first chart of the year, "I'm the Only One" by Melissa Etheridge moved up to number one, displacing the final number one of 1994, "I'll Make Love to You" by Boyz II Men. The two songs alternated at number one once again before the Eagles took the top spot with "Love Will Keep Us Alive" in the issue of Billboard dated January 28. The band had recently reunited more than a decade after breaking up, and "Love Will Keep Us Alive" was the group's second AC chart-topper, twenty years almost to the day after "Best of My Love" had reached number one. The Eagles were replaced at number one by Madonna with "Take a Bow", the fifth and final Adult Contemporary chart-topper for the singer dubbed the "Queen of Pop" but the longest-running, spending nine weeks atop the chart.

From early June until mid-November, three songs held the top spot, all of which were taken from film and TV soundtracks. The Canadian singer Bryan Adams spent five weeks at number one with "Have You Ever Really Loved a Woman?" from the film Don Juan de Marco. It was followed into the top spot in early July by "I'll Be There for You" by the Rembrandts, the theme song from the TV show Friends. In late August, the British singer Seal reached number one with "Kiss from a Rose", which featured on the soundtrack of the film Batman Forever. Seal's song remained at number one for 12 consecutive weeks, tying the record for the longest run atop the Adult Contemporary chart. The final AC chart-topper of 1995 was "One Sweet Day", a collaboration between Mariah Carey and Boyz II Men, which reached number one on the last chart of the year. The R&B ballad would go on to hold the top spot for the first 12 weeks of 1996 for a final total of 13 weeks at number one, another new record for the Adult Contemporary listing, as well as topping Billboard's pop chart, the Hot 100, for a record-breaking 16 weeks.

== Chart history ==
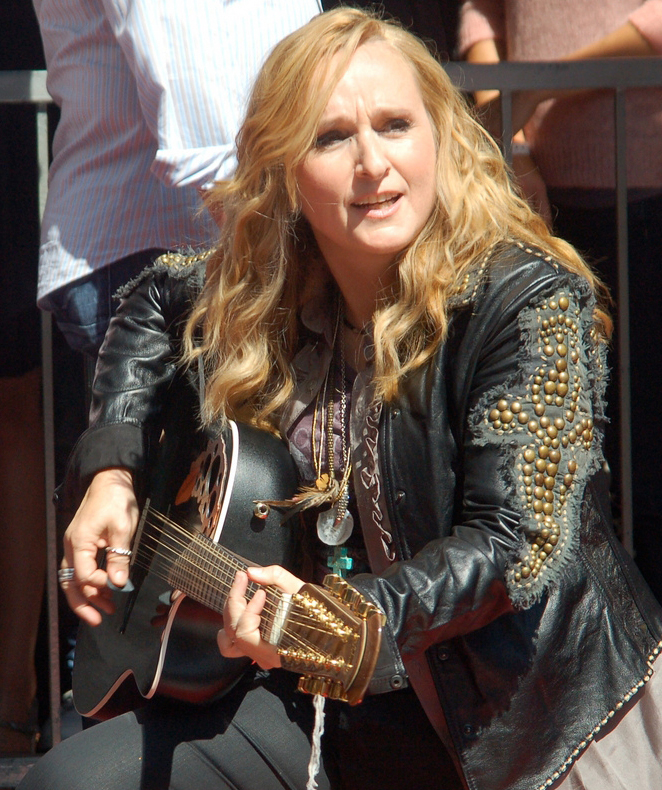
Melissa Etheridge had the first number one of 1995.

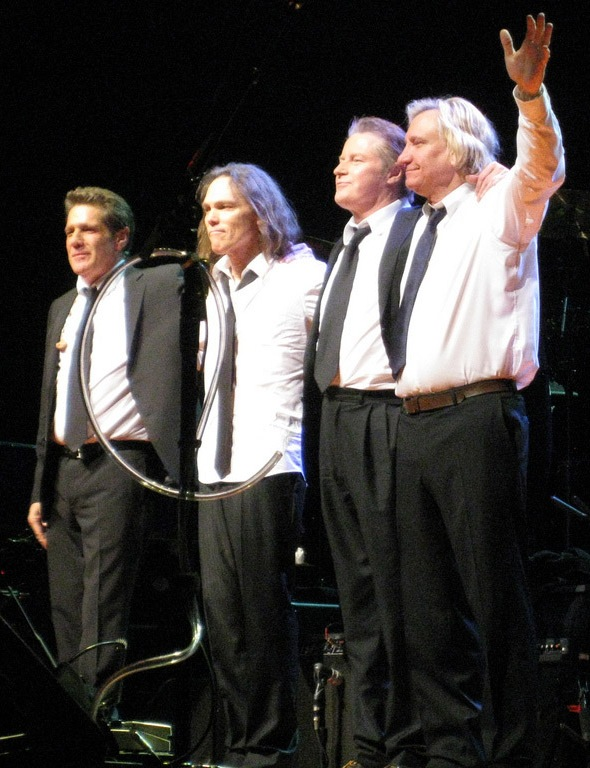
The Eagles topped the AC chart for the first time since 1975 with their song "Love Will Keep Us Alive".

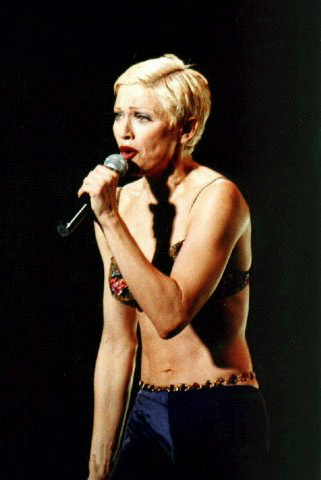
Madonna had her longest-running AC number one with "Take a Bow".

Chart history
Issue date	Title	Artist(s)	Ref.
January 7	"I'm the Only One"	Melissa Etheridge	
January 14	"I'll Make Love to You"	Boyz II Men	
January 21	"I'm the Only One"	Melissa Etheridge	
January 28	"Love Will Keep Us Alive"	Eagles	
February 4	"Love Will Keep Us Alive"	Eagles	
February 11	"Love Will Keep Us Alive"	Eagles	
February 18	"Take a Bow"	Madonna	
February 25	"Take a Bow"	Madonna	
March 4	"Take a Bow"	Madonna	
March 11	"Take a Bow"	Madonna	
March 18	"Take a Bow"	Madonna	
March 25	"Take a Bow"	Madonna	
April 1	"Take a Bow"	Madonna	
April 8	"Take a Bow"	Madonna	
April 15	"Take a Bow"	Madonna	
April 22	"In the House of Stone and Light"	Martin Page	
April 29	"In the House of Stone and Light"	Martin Page	
May 6	"In the House of Stone and Light"	Martin Page	
May 13	"In the House of Stone and Light"	Martin Page	
May 20	"Believe"	Elton John	
May 27	"Believe"	Elton John	
June 3	"Have You Ever Really Loved a Woman?"	Bryan Adams	
June 10	"Have You Ever Really Loved a Woman?"	Bryan Adams	
June 17	"Have You Ever Really Loved a Woman?"	Bryan Adams	
June 24	"Have You Ever Really Loved a Woman?"	Bryan Adams	
July 1	"Have You Ever Really Loved a Woman?"	Bryan Adams	
July 8	"I'll Be There for You"	The Rembrandts	
July 15	"I'll Be There for You"	The Rembrandts	
July 22	"I'll Be There for You"	The Rembrandts	
July 29	"I'll Be There for You"	The Rembrandts	
August 5	"I'll Be There for You"	The Rembrandts	
August 12	"I'll Be There for You"	The Rembrandts	
August 19	"I'll Be There for You"	The Rembrandts	
August 26	"Kiss from a Rose"	Seal	
September 2	"Kiss from a Rose"	Seal	
September 9	"Kiss from a Rose"	Seal	
September 16	"Kiss from a Rose"	Seal	
September 23	"Kiss from a Rose"	Seal	
September 30	"Kiss from a Rose"	Seal	
October 7	"Kiss from a Rose"	Seal	
October 14	"Kiss from a Rose"	Seal	
October 21	"Kiss from a Rose"	Seal	
October 28	"Kiss from a Rose"	Seal	
November 4	"Kiss from a Rose"	Seal	
November 11	"Kiss from a Rose"	Seal	
November 18	"As I Lay Me Down"	Sophie B. Hawkins	
November 25	"As I Lay Me Down"	Sophie B. Hawkins	
December 2	"As I Lay Me Down"	Sophie B. Hawkins	
December 9	"As I Lay Me Down"	Sophie B. Hawkins	
December 16	"As I Lay Me Down"	Sophie B. Hawkins	
December 23	"As I Lay Me Down"	Sophie B. Hawkins	
December 30	"One Sweet Day"	Mariah Carey & Boyz II Men	

== See also ==
- 1995 in music
- List of artists who reached number one on the U.S. Adult Contemporary chart
