= Bodysurfer (miniseries) =

- Based on: short stories of Robert Drewe
- Written by: Suzanne Hawley; Chris Lee; Denis Whitburn
- Directed by: Ian Barry
- Starring: Peter Kowitz; Joy Smithers; Linda Cropper
- Theme music composer: Martin Armiger
- Country of origin: Australia
- Original language: English
- No. of episodes: 4 x 1 hour

Original release
- Network: ABC
- Release: 9 August – 10 August 1989

Bodysurfer is a 1989 Australian mini series about a Sydney architect having a midlife crisis.

== Cast ==
- Peter Kowitz as David Lang
- Melissa Marshall as Helen Lang
- Joy Smithers as Lydia
- Linda Cropper as Anthea
- Patrick Ward as Kev Parnell
- Penne Hackforth-Jones as Angela Lang
- Abigail as Mrs. James
- Tim Robertson as Rex Lang
- Anthony Brandon Wong as Dr Wu
- Jerome Ehlers as Mooney Mooney Youth
- Richard Moir as Brian
- Peter Curtin as Bernie

== Music ==
- Martin Armiger - composer
- Derek Williams - orchestrator, conductor
