= Hullabaloo (song) =

Single by Absent Friends

from the album Here's Looking Up Your Address
- Released: March 1990
- Recorded: 1989
- Length: 4:16
- Label: RooART
- Songwriter(s): John Mackay, Sean Kelly
- Producer(s): Sean Kelly and Garry Gary Beers

Absent Friends singles chronology
| "Hallelujah" (1989) | "Hullabaloo" (1990) | "I Don't Want to Be with Nobody but You" (1990) |

"Hullabaloo" is a song by Australian band Absent Friends. It was released in March 1990 as the second single from third debut album Here's Looking Up Your Address. It peaked at number 46 on the Australian Singles Charts.

== Track listing ==
7" single (876 962-7)
| No. | Title | Writer(s) | Length |
|---|---|---|---|
| 1. | "Hullabaloo" | John Mackay, Sean Kelly | 4:16 |
| 2. | "A Short Walk" | Andrew Duffield, James Cockington | 4:00 |

CD single (876 963-2)
| No. | Title | Writer(s) | Length |
|---|---|---|---|
| 1. | "Hullabaloo" | John Mackay, Sean Kelly | 4:16 |
| 2. | "A Short Walk" | Andrew Duffield, James Cockington | 4:00 |
| 3. | "Bringing Up Edward" | Andrew Duffield | 2:59 |

== Charts ==
| Chart (1990) | Peak position |
|---|---|
| Australia (ARIA) | 40 |
