= Émigré (album) =

Album by Wendy Matthews discography

Studio album by Wendy Matthews
- Released: 2 November 1990
- Recorded: May–July 1990
- Genre: Pop
- Label: rooArt
- Producer: Ricky Fataar

Wendy Matthews chronology
You've Always Got the Blues (1988)	Émigré (1990)	The Way It Has to Be (1991)

Singles from Émigré
- 1. "Token Angels" Released: 2 September 1990; 2. "Woman's Gotta Have It" Released: 20 January 1991; 3. "Let's Kiss (Like Angels Do)" Released: 14 April 1991

Professional ratings
Review scores
Source	Rating
Allmusic	(?)

Émigré is the debut solo studio album by Australian singer-songwriter Wendy Matthews released by rooArt in Australia in November 1990. It was produced by Ricky Fataar and reached No. 11 on the Australian Albums Chart. It yielded three singles: "Token Angels", "Woman's Gotta Have It" and "Let's Kiss (Like Angels Do)". Matthews won the ARIA Award for Best Female Artist at the ARIA Music Awards of 1991.

== Background ==
Wendy Matthews completed her touring commitments for the new wave group Absent Friends in mid-1990. She went into the studio with producer Ricky Fataar (ex-Beach Boys, Rutles) to record her debut solo album, Émigré. Her session musicians included Absent Friends' members Garry Gary Beers (also in INXS) on bass guitar, Andrew Duffield on keyboards, Sean Kelly on guitar, Roger Mason on keyboards, James Valentine on saxophone, and Mick King on guitar. She also enlisted Tim Finn (Crowded House) and Peter Blakeley on backing vocals. The album peaked at No. 11 on the Australian Recording Industry Association Albums Charts. It spawned the hit singles "Token Angels" (No. 18 in November 1990), Bobby Womack's "Woman's Gotta Have It" (No. 34 in February 1991) and "Let's Kiss (Like Angels Do)" (No. 14 in June). Matthews won 'Best Female Artist' and 'Breakthrough Artist – Single' ("Token Angels") at the ARIA Music Awards of 1991. Matthews was also voted 'Best Female Singer' in the 1990 Australian Rolling Stone readers poll.

For touring in support of the album, Matthews used Paul Abrahams on bass guitar, Amanda Brown on oboe, violin (ex-The Go-Betweens), Robbie James on guitar (Gang Gajang), King on guitar, Lisa Maxwell on backing vocals, Mark Meyer on drums (Mark Gillespie Band, Moving Pictures), Mark O'Connor on keyboards and Valentine on saxophone. In October 1991, she issued a live mini-album The Way It Has to Be and toured as support to US R&B group, The Neville Brothers. At the end of 1991, Matthews recorded her second full-length album Lily, which was produced by T-Bone Burnett and released in late 1992.

== Track listing ==
All songwriters as listed.

1. "Token Angels" (Roger Mason) – 4:53
2. "As We Speak" (Robbie James, Paul Abrahams) – 4:17
3. "Won't Let Me Be (Georgia's Song)" (James Valentine, Wendy Matthews, Andrew Duffield) – 5:01
4. "Taking My Heart Around" (Danny Peck) – 4:35
5. "Square Moon" (Robbie James, Geoff Stapleton, K Govett) – 3:53
6. "Woman's Gotta Have It" (Bobby Womack) – 4:19
7. "State of Mind" (J Williams, B Cook) – 4:25
8. "Doomsday Lullaby" (Peck) – 4:38
9. "Goin' Back to My Roots" (Lamont Dozier) – 6:04
10. "Long Way from Home" (Matthews) – 3:12
11. "Let's Kiss (Like Angels Do)" (J Friedman, C Curtis) – 3:29

Note, track 10 "Long Way from Home" appears to be a cover of the Sandy Denny song "The Music Weaver" but Denny is not credited.

== Personnel ==
- Wendy Matthews – vocals
- Peter Blakeley – backing vocals
- Garry Gary Beers – bass guitar
- Andrew Duffield – keyboards
- Tim Finn – backing vocals
- Sean Kelly – guitar
- Mick King – guitar
- Robbie James – guitar
- Mark O'Connor – keyboards
- Roger Mason – keyboards
- James Valentine – saxophone

== Charts ==
Chart (1990/91)	Peak position
Australian Albums (ARIA)	11

== Certifications ==
Region	Certification	Certified units/sales
Australia (ARIA)	Platinum	70,000^{^}
^{^} Shipments figures based on certification alone.
