= Then I Walked Away =

Single by Wendy Matthews

from the album Ghosts
- Released: May 1997
- Studio: Megaphon and Studios 301
- Length: 4:12
- Label: Sony BMG
- Songwriter(s): Gary Clark, Eric Pressley
- Producer(s): Glenn Skinner, Wendy Matthews

Wendy Matthews singles chronology
"Say a Prayer" (1995)	"Then I Walked Away" (1997)	"Big" (1997)

"Then I Walked Away" is a song by Australian recording artist Wendy Matthews. It was released in May 1997 as the lead single from her fourth studio album, Ghosts. The song peaked at number 75 on the Australian charts.

At the ARIA Music Awards of 1997, the song was nominated for Best Female Artist.

== Track listing ==
1. "Then I Walked Away" (Edit) - 4:12
2. "Sweet Love" - 4:21
3. "Unfurl the Coil" - 4:37

== Charts ==
Chart (1997)	Peak position
Australia (ARIA)	75
