= The Way It Has to Be =

Live album by Wendy Matthews
- Released: 18 October 1991
- Recorded: Dallas Brooks Hall, 31 May 1991
- Genre: Pop
- Label: rooART

Wendy Matthews chronology
Émigré (1990)	The Way It Has to Be (1991)	Lily (1992)

The Way It Has to Be is the first live album released by Australian singer Wendy Matthews recorded in Melbourne in May 1991, the album was released in October 1991. Following the commercial and critical success of her album Émigré, Matthews assembled a touring band that included Paul Abrahams (bass), Robbie James (guitar), Michael King (guitar), Amanda Brown (oboe, violin), James Valentine (sax), Mark O'Connor (keyboards), Lisa Maxwell (backing vocals) and Mark Meyer (drums).

== Track listing ==
1. "If You're Ready" (Homer Banks, Raymond Jackson, Carl Hampton)
2. "As We Speak" (Paul Abrahams, Robbie James)
3. "Token Angels" (Roger Mason)
4. "I Didn't Take Your Man"
5. "Until You Say" (Preston Glass, Narada Michael Walden)
6. "Bitter Fruit" (Little Steven)
7. "Doomsday Lullaby" (Danny Bruce Peck)
8. "Take Your Time"
9. "Sweet Fire of Love" (Robbie Robertson, U2)

== Charts ==
Weekly chart performance for The Way It Has to Be
Chart (1990–91)	Peak position
Australian Albums (ARIA)	102
