= Stringer (TV series) =

1988 Australian television series

- Written by: Christopher Lee; Billy Marshall-Stoneking; Steve Wright
- Directed by: Kathy Mueller; Ken Cameron; Chris Thomson
- Starring: Derrick O'Connor; Nicholas Papademetriou
- Composer: Martin Armiger
- Country of origin: Australia
- Original language: English
- No. of seasons: 1
- No. of episodes: 8

Production
- Executive producer: Sandra Levy
- Producer: John Edwards
- Cinematography: Jeffrey Malouf
- Editors: Michael Honey; Bill Russo
- Running time: 60 minutes

Original release
- Network: ABC
- Release: April 25 – June 14, 1988

Stringer is an Australian television series that aired on ABC in 1988.

== Cast ==
- Derrick O'Connor as Frank Buchanan
- Nicholas Papademetriou as Yannis Moustakas
- Susan Lyons as Laura Chandler
- Lynette Curran as Valerie Gordon
- Dorothy St. Heaps as Kate McGuire
- Joy Smithers

== Synopsis ==
Stringer featured Derrick O'Connor as Frank Buchanan, a war correspondent who returns to Sydney and teams up with taxi driver Yannis Moustakas, played by Nicholas Papademetriou.

== Soundtrack ==
It was also noted for its music which was directed by Martin Armiger and featured Wendy Matthews and Kate Ceberano. The soundtrack album, titled You've Always Got the Blues, won two ARIA Music Awards in 1989.

== Reception ==
Commenting on the opening episode, The Canberra Times' Ian Warden wrote that it had "a story as sheer and transparent as panty hose" and speculated that the character of Yannis Moustakas may become a "major albatross around the program's neck". Of the same episode, Barbara Hutton in The Age said "The show may well get better as it goes on. Barbara Hooks of The Age called it "a simply splendid new drama series" saying that the writers "have taken standard, contrived themes and wrought the most marvellous variations".

Diana Simmonds of The Sydney Morning Herald wrote that Papademetriou "almost saves the day with his energetic and well-realised portrayal of Moustakis" and that "Stringer is not a total disaster but, with more care, it could have been a cracker." Richard Coleman in The Sydney Morning Herald said "The problem with Stringer is that, while it is very easy to look at and is very well played by its principals, nothing terribly much happens." Garrie Hutchinson in The Age wrote that it was "less dramatic than ancient episodes of Minder and not as funny as equally decrepit hours of The Goodies".
