= Love in the First Degree (film) =

2004 film

- Directed by: Michael Egan
- Written by: Bernie DeLeo
- Produced by: Tor Larsen; Michael Egan
- Starring: Rhett Giles; Joy Smithers
- Cinematography: Robert Agganis
- Edited by: Anne Ker
- Music by: Melanie Horsnell
- Distributed by: Half Mute
- Release date: 2004
- Running time: 87 minutes
- Country: Australia
- Language: English
- Budget: $100,000

Love in the First Degree is a 2004 Australian romantic comedy film directed by Michael Egan and starring Joy Smithers and Rhett Giles. It debuted at the 2004 Houston Worldfest.

== Cast ==
- Rhett Giles as Fred Thatcher
- Joy Smithers as Leslie Barrett
- Walter Kennard as Graham Gaines III
- Ally Fowler as Jill
- Kelly Butler as Trish
- Jonathan Elsom as Willard McPhee
- Rory Williamson as Jeff Dixon
- Gennie Nevinson as Elizabeth Barrett
- David Baldwin as Russell Barrett
- Leonid Dobrinsky as Boris

== Reception ==
In FilmInk Brian Duff gives it a rating of $8.50 (out of $20) and writes "Cliches are almost as ubiquitous here as indulgent Sydney skyline shots, and not nearly as welcome. However, some charm does find its way through the dusky malaise of the rom-com genre, often through what appears to be organic interactions, and generally well-paced dialogue." On At the Movies Margaret Pomeranz gave it 3 stars and David Stratton gave it 2 1/2. Pomeranz said "Do you know what impressed me about this film? The fact that Joy Smithers is such a talent and is so unused on the big screen in this country. She is actually the performance glue that holds this film together." Des Partridge in the Courier Mail gave it 2 1/2 stars saying "Giles and Smithers make an agreeable pairing, Rory Williamson as conceited actor Geoff Dixon has the best of the supporting roles, Robert Agganis's camerawork is impeccable, and Melanie Horsnell's music perfectly complements Egan's approach to the whimsical romance." Illawarra Mercury's Glen Humphries concludes "Love In The First Degree isn't going to set the world on fire, but that's not what it sets out to do. It's light, fun and entertaining." Ain't It Cool News's Latauro opines "The fact that they all jump in head-first makes it very difficult to dislike the film; the fact that it's set in a city that hasn't been done to death, with accents we haven't heard spouting rom-com dialogue... well, that's why it works. This film knows exactly what it is, and spends its entire running time enjoying itself."
