= Jonathan Elsom =

New Zealand actor

- Born: John Stephen Elsom; 22 September 1938 (age 87); Christchurch, South Island, New Zealand
- Occupations: Television actor; sculptor; artist; writer

Jonathan Elsom (born 22 September 1938) is a New Zealand-born television actor, writer, sculptor and artist. He appeared in many British and Australian television series and films, which include The Troubleshooters, The Avengers, The Saint, The Adventures of Don Quick, Z-Cars, Crown Court, Worzel Gummidge Down Under, The Feds, Review with Myles Barlow and others.

== Acting credits ==
| Title | Year | Role | Notes |
|---|---|---|---|
| Suspense | 1963 | Chris Hoather | Episode: "The White Hot Coal" |
| Festival | 1963 | Atiamov | Episode: "The Duel" |
| Armchair Theatre | 1964 | Hotel receptionist | Episode: "The Pretty English Girls" |
| Story Parade | 1964 | Guy | Episode: "The Bender" |
| Knock on Any Door | 1964 | Mills | Episode: "The Guests of Honour" |
| ITV Play of the Week | 1965 | Curate | Episode: "Mr. Fowlds" |
| Redcap | 1966 | Lieutenant Andrewa | Episode: "Rough Justice" |
| Our Man at St. Mark's | 1966 | Mr. Burns | Episode: "The Talking Machine" |
| The Troubleshooters | 1966 | Geoffrey Brady | Episode: "Four Cheers for Geoffrey" |
| The Baron | 1967 | Lieutenant | Episode: "Long Ago and Far Away" |
| Write a Play | 1967 | | Episode: "Revenge Is Not So Sweet & Shoplifting" |
| Escape | 1967 | Briggs | Episode: "The Kindness of Strangers" |
| Smashing Time | 1967 | Posh boyfriend at pie shop | Film |
| The Avengers | 1967 | Ackroyd / Chattell | 2 episodes |
| The Saint | 1968 | Andrew | Episode: "The Best Laid Schemes" |
| The Power Game | 1969 | John Lacey | Episode: "One Via Zurich" |
| Rogues' Gallery | 1969 | The Lieutenant | Episode: "The Wicked Stage" |
| ITV Sunday Night Theatre | 1969-1973 | Lieutenant / Man 1 / Linge | 3 episodes |
| Big Brother | 1970 | Anthony Thorne | Episode: "The Wife Factor" |
| The Mating Machine | 1970 | Foulkes | Episode: "Who Sleeps on the Right?" |
| The Adventures of Don Quick | 1970 | Dovax | Episode: "People Isn't Everything" |
| Catweazle | 1971 | Dr. Hawkins | Episode: "The Black Wheels" |
| The Mind of Mr. J. G. Reeder | 1971 | Max | Episode: "The Shadow Man" |
| Kate | 1971 | Dr. Hunter | Episode: "Call Her Sensitive" |
| Public Eye | 1971 | Mr. Thwaite Singleton | Episode: "John VII. Verse 24" |
| Z-Cars | 1971 | Cleve | Episode: "Collation: Part 1" |
| Up the Chastity Belt | 1972 | 1st Horseman | Film |
| Away from It All | 1973 | Nigel | Episode: "The Summer House" |
| Bowler | 1973 | Gilpin | Episode: "Sweet and Sour Charity" |
| Crown Court | 1973-1983 | Marcus Golding QC | 41 episodes |
| Marked Personal | 1974 | Rodney Blake | 2 episodes |
| Thriller | 1974 | John Stratford | Episode: "Only a Scream Away" |
| Special Branch | 1974 | Koniev | Episode: "Stand and Deliver" |
| Napoleon and Love | 1974 | Arnault | Episode: "Josephine" |
| Armchair Cinema | 1974 | Interviewer | Episode: "Regan" |
| The Early Life of Stephen Hind | 1974 | Duffy | 1 episode |
| A Private Enterprise | 1974 | | Film |
| The Venturers | 1975 | Michael Croxley | Episode: "Who Wants to Be a Millionaire?" |
| Circus | 1975 | Auld | 6 episodes |
| The Sweeney | 1976 | Mr. Bradshaw | Episode: "Selected Target" |
| Face of Darkness | 1976 | Philip | Film |
| Rising Damp | 1977 | Douglas | Episode: "Fawcett's Python" |
| Jubilee | 1977 | James Cartwright | Episode: "Plain Jane" |
| The Devil's Crown | 1978 | Leopold – Duke of Austria | Episode: "When Cage-Birds Sing" |
| Will Shakespeare | 1978 | Dr. Hall | Episode: "The Living Record" |
| Target | 1978 | George | Episode: "The Run" |
| Danger UXB | 1979 | Captain RAOC | Episode: "Just Like a Woman" |
| The Great Riviera Bank Robbery | 1979 | Magistrate | Film |
| To the Manor Born | 1979-1981 | J.J. Anderson | 4 episodes |
| The Godsend | 1980 | Executive | Film |
| Very Like a Whale | 1980 | Interviewer | TV movie |
| Jukes of Piccadilly | 1980 | Vincenzo | 2 episodes |
| Rough Cut | 1980 | Lambert | Film |
| Leap in the Dark | 1980 | David | "To Kill a King" |
| Lady Killers | 1980-1981 | Mr. Hutton / Mr. Anthony Hawke | 2 episodes |
| Kreuzfahrten eines Globetrotters | 1981 | Buchhändler | Episode: "Der schöpferische Impuls" |
| The Life and Times of David Lloyd George | 1981 | Maurice Hankey | 3 episodes |
| Bergerac | 1981 | Sammler | Episode: "Late for a Funeral" |
| Busted | 1983 | Mr. Parker | TV movie |
| By the Sword Divided | 1983 | Reverend Butterworth | 6 episodes |
| Struggle | 1983 | Forbes | Episode: "Better Red Than Dead" |
| Marjorie and Men | 1985 | Head waiter | Episode: "Talking the Waters" |
| Bulman | 1985 | Giuseppe | Episode: "A Moveable Feast" |
| Storyboard | 1985 | Captain Manders | Episode: "Ladies in Charge" |
| Mesmerized | 1985 | Public Prosecutor | Film |
| Minder | 1985-1989 | Muir | 2 episodes |
| Mapp and Lucia | 1986 | Motorist | Episode: "Change and Change About" |
| Executive Stress | 1986 | Mark Wilson | 1 episode |
| Ping Pong | 1987 | Probate Official | Film |
| Across the Lake | 1988 | Norman Buckley | TV movie |
| Worzel Gummidge Down Under | 1989 | Duke Ferguson | Episode: "The Beauty Contest" |
| Anglo-Saxon Attitudes | 1992 | Jasper Stringwell | 2 episodes |
| The Feds: Seduction | 1993 | Justin | TV movie |
| All Saints | 2000-2003 | Judge / Don Murphy | 11 episodes |
| Love in the First Degree | 2004 | Willard McPhee | Film |
| Review with Myles Barlow | 2010 | Herbert | 2 episodes |
| Pirates of the Caribbean: Dead Men Tell No Tales | 2017 | Priest | Film |
| Three Thousand | 2017 | Pop | Short, (post-production) |
