= Woman's Gotta Have It (song) =

1972 single by Bobby Womack

Single by Bobby Womack

from the album Understanding
- B-side: "(If You Don't Want My Love) Give It Back"
- Released: 1972
- Recorded: 1972
- Genre: R&B; soul
- Length: 3:30
- Label: UA 50902
- Songwriter(s): Darryl Carter; Bobby Womack; Linda Womack
- Producer(s): Bobby Womack

Bobby Womack singles chronology
"That's The Way I Feel About Cha" (1972)	"Woman's Gotta Have It" (1972)	"Sweet Caroline (Good Times Never Seemed So Good)" (1972)

"Woman's Gotta Have It" is a song written by Darryl Carter, Bobby Womack and Linda Womack. The song was recorded at American Sound Studio in Memphis, Tennessee.

== Song background ==
The idea for the song came from a marital situation that Darryl Carter knew of where the wife was about to "tip out" on an unresponsive husband. Carter and Linda Womack (the daughter of Sam Cooke and one-time stepdaughter of Bobby who later married Bobby's brother, Cecil) originally wrote the song with Jackie Wilson in mind.

== Chart performance ==
Released as a single from Bobby's 1972 album Understanding, it reached number one on the R&B chart and peaked at number 60 on the pop chart in the US.

== Wendy Matthews' version ==
"Woman's Gotta Have It"

Single by Wendy Matthews

from the album Émigré
- Released: January 1991
- Genre: Pop
- Label: RooART
- Producer(s): Ricky Fataar

Wendy Matthews singles chronology
"Token Angels" (1990)	"Woman's Gotta Have It" (1991)	"Let's Kiss (Like Angels Do)" (1991)

Australian recording artist Wendy Matthews released a version of the song in January 1991 as the second single from her debut solo studio album, Émigré. The song peaked at number 34 on the ARIA Charts.

=== Track listing ===
CD/7" single

1. "Woman's Gotta Have It" - 4:21
2. "Acid Rain" - 3:27

12" single

1. "Woman's Gotta Have It" (Club Mix)
2. "Acid Rain"
3. "Woman's Gotta Have It" (Club Dub)
4. "Token Angels"

=== Charts ===
Chart (1991)	Peak position
Australia (ARIA)	34

== Other versions ==
- The song was covered by James Taylor and included on Taylor's 1976 album In the Pocket. Rolling Stone critic Kit Rachlis described this version as "listless." On the other hand, Record World said that "Taylor's breezy vocal sound suits material like this Bobby Womack number perfectly."
- It has also been covered by Nona Gaye for the compilation 1-800-NEW FUNK
- The Neville Brothers on their: "Live At Tipitina's, September 24, 1982" LP
- K-Ci covered it on his 2006 album "My Book"
- Taylor Hicks on his 2009 album The Distance, and Calvin Richardson.

== See also ==
- List of Best Selling Soul Singles number ones of 1972
