= The Dukes (Australian band) =

Australian rock band

- Also known as: Sean Kelly and the Iron Dukes
- Origin: Sydney, New South Wales, Australia
- Genres: R&B, soul, funk
- Years active: 1990–1994
- Label: Sony Music
- Past members: Sean Kelly; Geoffrey Stapleton; Peter Willersdorf; Tony Georgeson; Mark Dennison; Kevin Dubber
- Website: The Dukes

The Dukes were an Australian rock band active from 1990 to 1994. Initially called Sean Kelly and the Iron Dukes, they were formed by Sean Kelly (ex-Models, Absent Friends) on vocals and keyboards; and Geoffrey Stapleton (GANGgajang, Absent Friends) on keyboards and guitar. They were soon joined by Michael Armiger (Paul Kelly and the Coloured Girls, The Go-Betweens) on bass guitar; Michael King (Absent Friends) on guitar and backing vocals; and John Mackay (Absent Friends) on drums and percussion.

== Biography ==
The band were originally called Sean Kelly and the Iron Dukes, but were renamed shortly after to the Dukes. The band was formed by Sean Kelly (Models) and Geoffrey Stapleton (GANGgajang) following their return to Sydney in 1990 after the completion of a European tour, supporting INXS, with their previous band Absent Friends. The original members of the Iron Dukes were Kelly, Stapleton, Michael Armiger (Paul Kelly and the Coloured Girls, The Go-Betweens), Michael King (Absent Friends) and John Mackay (Absent Friends). Other band members were bass player Peter Willersdorf, drummer Tony Georgeson, Mark Dennison (DD Smash) on saxophone and occasional keyboard and Kevin Dubber (DD Smash) on trumpet. The group debuted as Sean Kelly and the Iron Dukes at Patrick's Nite Club in Pennant Hills on 11 January 1990. In 1992 they signed with Sony Music.

That year, they released a number of singles, with "Gonna Get High" and "Faith" reaching No. 60 and No. 29 respectively on the Australian singles charts. In December 1992 the band released its debut and only album, Harbour City, it was co-written and co-produced by Kelly and Stapleton. Stapleton providing paintings for each song for the album booklet and the art work for all of the single and album covers. Harbour City was nominated for an ARIA Award in 1993 for the category 'Best Breakthrough Artist – Album'.

In 1993 they released "I Fought the Law" from soundtrack for the Yahoo Serious movie Reckless Kelly.

On 23 September 1993 The Dukes performed "Faith" to 250,000 people at Circular Quay, minutes before Sydney was announced as the host city for the 2000 Summer Olympics. The band disbanded in early 1994.

== Members ==
- Mark Dennison – saxophone (1991–1993)
- Kevin Dubber – trumpet (1991–1993)
- Tony Georgeson – drums, percussion (1991–1993)
- Sean Kelly – vocals, guitar (1991–1993)
- Geoff Stapleton – keyboard, guitar (1991–1993)
- Peter Willersdorf – bass (1991–1993)

== Discography ==
=== Studio albums ===
Title	Details	Peak chart positions
Title	Details	AUS
Harbour City	Released: December 1992; Label: Columbia (472082 2); Format: CD	88

=== Singles ===
Title	Year	Chart peak positions	Album
Title	Year	AUS	Album
"Gonna Get High"	1992	60	Harbour City
"Faith"	1992	29	Harbour City
"Nothing Can Bring Me Down"	1993	155	Harbour City
"I Fought the Law"	1993	88	Reckless Kelly

== Awards ==
=== ARIA Music Awards ===
The ARIA Music Awards is an annual awards ceremony that recognises excellence, innovation, and achievement across all genres of Australian music.

Year	Nominee / work	Award	Result
1993	Harbour City	Breakthrough Artist – Album	Nominated
