= Ghosts (Wendy Matthews album) =

Studio album by Wendy Matthews
- Released: 25 August 1997
- Label: Sony BMG
- Producer: Matthews; Glenn Skinner

Wendy Matthews chronology
The Witness Tree (1994)	Ghosts (1997)	Stepping Stones (1999)

Singles from Ghosts
- 1. "Then I Walked Away" Released: 19 May 1997; 2. "Big" Released: 15 September 1997; 3. "Beloved" Released: 19 February 1998

Ghosts is the fourth solo studio album by Australian singer Wendy Matthews released in Australia by Sony BMG on 25 August 1997. The album debuted and peaked at number 43 in Australia.

The album was nominated for Best Adult Contemporary Album at the ARIA Music Awards of 1998 but lost out to Looking for Butter Boy by Archie Roach.

== Track listing ==
1. "Break the Girl" - 4:31
2. "Then I Walked Away" - 4:31
3. "Your Slight Admiration" - 5:09
4. "Big" - 3:34
5. "I Lied" - 2:22
6. "Beloved" - 4:30
7. "Ten Miles of Timber" - 4:43
8. "Halcyon Days" - 4:40
9. "Soul Debt" - 4:40
10. "Ghosts" - 4:07
11. "My Secret" - 2:08
12. "Find Me Here" - 3:04
13. "Mountains" - 5:11

== Charts ==
Chart (1997)	Peak position
Australian Albums (ARIA)	43
