= She (Wendy Matthews album) =

Studio album by Wendy Matthews
- Released: 8 November 2008
- Recorded: 2007−08
- Genre: Pop
- Label: Barking Bear Records

Wendy Matthews chronology
The Essential Wendy Matthews (2007)	She (2008)	The Welcome Fire (2013)

Singles from She
- 1. "Fallen Angels" Released: 2008

She is the seventh studio album released by Australian singer Wendy Matthews in November 2008. She is a collection of personal favourite songs by women who have inspired her over the years, songs by Bonnie Raitt, Aretha Franklin, Chrissie Hynde, Joni Mitchell and Buffy Sainte-Marie. This is her first independent album on her own "Barking Bear Records" label.

== Track listing ==
1. Fallen Angels – 3:48 (Buffy Sainte-Marie from Coincidence and Likely Stories
2. Cherokee Louise – 4:23 (Joni Mitchell from Night Ride Home)
3. Four Strong Winds – 4:02 (Ian and Sylvia, Four Strong Winds)
4. She – 3:38 (Emmylou Harris from Luxury Liner)
5. 'Til You Come Back To Me – 3:02 (Aretha Franklin, Until You Come Back to Me)
6. Kid – 3:57 (The Pretenders, from Pretenders (album))
7. Silverblue – 3:03 (Linda Ronstadt from Prisoner in Disguise)
8. Fruits Of My Labour – 3:41 (Lucinda Williams from World Without Tears)
9. Faithless Love – 3:28 (Linda Ronstadt from Heart Like a Wheel)
10. 99 Pounds – 2:47 (Ann Peebles from Straight from the Heart)
11. Life Is A Red Wagon – 4:17 (Jane Siberry from Bound by the Beauty)
12. Home – 3:28 (Bonnie Raitt from Sweet Forgiveness)
