= Dancing Daze =

- Based on: idea by Michael Cove; Chrissie Koltai
- Written by: Michael Cove; John Misto; Debra Oswald; Mark Stiles
- Directed by: Peter Fisk; Geoffrey Nottage; Jane Campion; Ron Elliott
- Starring: Meryl Tankard; Patsy Stephen
- Theme music composer: Sharon O'Neill
- Country of origin: Australia
- Original language: English
- No. of episodes: 6 x 1 hour

Production
- Producer: Jan Chapman

Original release
- Network: ABC
- Release: 16 February 1986 – 1986

Dancing Daze is a 1986 Australian mini series about two sisters from Wagga Wagga who leave their family pig farm to make it as dancers in the big city. The ABC series stars Meryl Tankard as Phoebe Green and Patsy Stephen as Kate Green.

At the ARIA Music Awards of 1987, Wendy Matthews was nominated for the ARIA Award for Best Female Artist for the title track. Martin Armiger was also nominated for ARIA Award for Best Original Soundtrack, Cast or Show Album for the album.

== Cast ==
- Meryl Tankard as Phoebe Green
- Patsy Stephen as Kate Green
- Laurence Clifford as Joe Wyatt
- Lance Curtis as Harry
- Norman Kaye as Stephen Issacs
- Paul Chubb as Oliver
- Dinah Shearing
- Jane Clifton as Lee Harper

== Reception ==
Jacqueline Lee Lewes of The Sydney Morning Herald wrote "You will like Dancing Daze. There's an originality and energy about it which is contagious." Susan Molloy, also of The Sydney Morning Herald, said "This one has wit, style, imagination, youth-giving enthusiasm for anyone aged under 40 and more than 18, intelligent script, pacy scenes, fabulous fashion ..., can this be true? And it's from the ABC."

== Soundtrack ==
Dancing Daze

Soundtrack album by various
- Released: February 1986
- Recorded: 1985
- Studio: ABC Television Mixdown Suite
- Genre: Pop; Rock
- Label: ABC Music
- Producer: Martin Armiger

Dancing Daze soundtrack was released in February 1986. A second soundtrack album featuring the Sydney Symphony Orchestra was also released.

SIDE A:

1. "Dancing Daze" (Sharon O'Neill) performed by Wendy Matthews and Jenny Morris.
2. "Can I Dance" (Mick Walter, Glen Muirhead - G. Lungren) performed by Mark Williams.
3. "Second Opinion" (Jenny Morris, Richard Fataar) performed by Mark Williams.
4. "Dare to Be Bold" (Sharon O'Neill) performed by Wendy Matthews.
5. "You're So Curious" (Jennifer Hunter-Brown, Michael Hegarty) performed by Marc Hunter.
6. "Disaster" (Stephen Cummings, Dean Richards) performed by Jane Clifton.

SIDE V:

1. "Against the Dance" (Martin Armiger) performed by Mark Williams.
2. "I Love It When We're Dancing" (Greg Macainsh, David Briggs) performed by Martin Armiger and Sherlie Matthews
3. "Might Have Been" (Martin Armiger, Michael Cove) performed by Jenny Morris, Mark Williams, Wendy Matthews.
4. "Phoebe" (Martin Armiger) performed by Marc Hunter.
5. "Casanova Club" (Larry Van Kriedt) performed by Larry Van Kriedt.
6. "Lost in a Dancing Daze" (Martin Armiger) performed by Wendy Matthews.
