= Avant-garde theatre =

Avant-garde theatre may refer to:

- French avant-garde theatre
- Russian avant-garde
- Experimental theatre
