= I Don't Want to Be with Nobody but You =

1990 single by Absent Friends

- Australian artwork

Single by Absent Friends featuring Wendy Matthews

from the album Here's Looking Up Your Address
- B-side: "Hallelujah"; "Hullabaloo"
- Released: 16 April 1990
- Length: 4:46
- Label: RooART
- Songwriter: Eddie Floyd
- Producers: Sean Kelly; Garry Beers

Absent Friends singles chronology
"Hullabaloo" (1990)	"I Don't Want to Be with Nobody but You" (1990)	"Harmony" (1990)

Wendy Matthews singles chronology
"Jump" (1988)	"I Don't Want to Be with Nobody but You" (1990)	"Token Angels" (1990)

Alternative cover
- UK and European artwork

"I Don't Want to Be with Nobody but You" is a song originally recorded by Dorothy Moore for her 1976 album Misty Blue. It was written by Eddie Floyd, who recorded his own version in 2008 for the album Eddie Loves You So. Australian band Absent Friends covered the song for their 1990 debut album, Here's Looking Up Your Address, featuring Wendy Matthews on lead vocals and Peter Blakeley on backing vocals.

Absent Friends' version was released in April 1990 as the third single from Here's Looking Up Your Address and debuted on the Australian Singles Chart at No. 45 in May 1990, eventually peaking at No. 4 that July. It won the Single of the Year award at the 1991 ARIA Music Awards. Matthews subsequently included it on her 1999 greatest hits album, Stepping Stones and on her 2007 compilation album, The Essential Wendy Matthews.

== Track listings ==
Australian 7-inch, CD, and cassette single
No.	Title	Writer(s)	Length
1.	"I Don't Want to Be with Nobody but You"	Eddie Floyd	4:46
2.	"Hallelujah"	Sean Kelly	4:39

Australian 12-inch single
No.	Title	Writer(s)	Length
1.	"I Don't Want to Be with Nobody but You"	Floyd	4:46
2.	"Hallelujah"	Kelly	4:39
3.	"Hullabaloo"	Kelly, John MacKay	4:17

UK 12-inch and CD single
No.	Title	Writer(s)	Length
1.	"I Don't Want to Be with Nobody but You"	Floyd	4:46
2.	"Pomona's Place"	Kelly	3:01
3.	"Hallelujah"	Kelly	4:39
4.	"Hullabaloo"	Kelly, MacKay	4:17

== Charts ==
=== Weekly charts ===
Chart (1990)	Peak position
Australia (ARIA)	4

=== Year-end charts ===
Chart (1990)	Position
Australia (ARIA)	31

== Sales and certifications ==
Region	Certification	Certified units/sales
Australia (ARIA)	Gold	35,000^{^}
^{^} Shipments figures based on certification alone.

== Other versions ==
The song has also been covered by Stevie Salas on the album The Electric Pow Wow (1993), Anne Robertson on the Australian Idol - The Final 13 CD (2005) and by Joss Stone on her 2012 album, The Soul Sessions Vol. 2.
