= The Witness Tree =

Studio album by Wendy Matthews
- Released: 14 November 1994
- Recorded: 1994 at The Plant in Sausalito, California
- Genre: Pop
- Length: 53:42
- Label: rooArt
- Producer: Booker T. Jones

Wendy Matthews chronology
Lily (1992)	The Witness Tree (1994)	Ghosts (1997)

Singles from The Witness Tree
- 1. "Standing Strong" Released: 19 September 1994; 2. "Love Will Keep Me Alive" Released: 30 January 1995; 3. "Say a Prayer" Released: 1995

The Witness Tree is the third solo studio album by Australian singer Wendy Matthews, released in Australia by rooArt on 14 November 1994. It is a non-traditional gospel album, with Matthews stating "the spirit of gospel is so uplifting, I have a lot of faith, but for me it's more nature and the elements." The Witness Tree debuted inside the Australian ARIA Albums Chart top twenty, but sales fell considerably short of those of Matthews's 1992 album Lily. The album was nominated for an ARIA Award in 1995 for "Best Adult Contemporary Album" and yielded three singles; "Standing Strong", "Love Will Keep Me Alive" and "Say a Prayer".

The Witness Tree debuted at number sixteen on the Australian ARIA Albums Chart, becoming Matthews's fourth top twenty album. The album dropped out of the top fifty after two months, and spent a total of twenty-one weeks in the top one hundred. The Australian Recording Industry Association awarded the album a platinum certification for shipping 70,000 copies. At the ARIA Music Awards of 1995, the album was nominated for Best Adult Contemporary Album but lost the award to "I've Got a Plan" by My Friend The Chocolate Cake.

== Background and content ==
"The tree is an ancient symbol that pervades most cultures and North American Indians have the Witness Tree. As a child my mother told me that the beautiful upright pines in our area were Holy People who had come back as a tree to stand in witness for hundreds of years".

— Wendy Matthews, Stepping Stones (1999)

The Witness Tree was recorded in 1994 at The Plant in Sausalito, California and produced by Booker T. Jones. Matthews states she chose Jones for the producer because "we got along very, very well and he's just steeped in music and rhythm and soul. He was the first person I thought of with this slight gospel, for want of a better word, flavoured album, and he was really into it." The idea for the album came about as Matthews found her interests and motivations "have a connection to the things that I'm feeling are very important as I get older, which are family, the seasons and our connections to the earth."

She explaines "I've got a lot of trust in myself and in something higher, so I wanted to make a non-traditional gospel album. The spirit of gospel is so uplifting. They celebrate, y'know? I have a lot of faith, but for me it's more nature and the elements. My grandfather taught me that every question you've ever had can be answered in nature but we have lost the ability to look, let alone ask." Matthews admitted that a few people from her label rooArt had tried to dissuade her from creating the album but she remained firm. She explains "I suppose people tend to be scared off by that kind of stuff. Having said that I wasn't trying to make a traditional gospel album at all. I mean I'm very interested in all kinds of spiritual matters, but I'm not a traditionally religious person at all. I don't know ... maybe they got a little bit thrown by that one."

== Track listing ==
1. "Quiet Joys of Brotherhood" (Richard Fariña) – 3:18
2. "God Watch Over You" (Paddy McAloon) – 4:31
3. "Love Will Keep Me Alive" (Jim Capaldi, Paul Carrack, Peter Vale) – 4:14
4. "Standing Strong" (Matthews, Glenn Skinner) – 4:54
5. "Hymn of the Big Wheel" (Horace Andy, Neneh Cherry, Grantley Marshall, A. Vowles, Del Naja) – 5:22
6. "If I Can Dream" (Walter Earl Brown) – 3:47
7. "O Happy Day" (Edwin Hawkins) – 4:48
8. "Standback" (Tim Finn, Matthews) – 3:05
9. "It Ain't Wrong" (Booker T. Jones, Matthews, Don Walker) – 3:56
10. "Happy" (Finn, Matthews) – 3:26
11. "Ride" (McAloon) – 4:41
12. "Say a Prayer" (Jordan Knutson) – 3:20
13. "Ruins (Jesu, Joy of Man's Desire)" (Robbie James, Matthews) – 4:20

== Charts ==
=== Weekly charts ===
Weekly chart performance for The Witness Tree
Chart (1994–95)	Peak position
Australian Albums (ARIA)	16

=== Year-end charts ===
1994 year-end chart performance for The Witness Tree
Chart (1994)	Position
Australian Albums (ARIA)	75

== Certifications ==
Region	Certification	Certified units/sales
Australia (ARIA)	Platinum	70,000^{^}
^{^} Shipments figures based on certification alone.

== Personnel ==
The following people contributed to The Witness Tree:

- Johnnie Bamont — baritone saxophone.
- Kitty Beethoven — voice.
- Marquinho Brazil — shaker, caxixi, udu.
- Ndugu Chancler — drums.
- Jeff Cressman — trombone.
- Louis Fasman — trumpet, flugelhorn.
- Tim Finn — voice.
- Nikita Germaine — voice.
- Booker T. Jones — keyboards, organ, piano.
- John Lacey — didgeridoo.
- Tony Lindsay — voice.
- Bennie Reitvelo — bass.
- Marc Russo — saxophone.
- Larry Sampson — voice.
- Rick Wilson — guitar.

== See also ==
- A Witness Tree
