= Beloved (Wendy Matthews song) =

Single by Wendy Matthews

from the album Ghosts
- Released: February 1998
- Length: 4:15
- Label: Sony BMG
- Songwriter(s): Wendy Matthews, Glenn Skinner

Wendy Matthews singles chronology
"Big" (1997)	"Beloved" (1998)	"I've Got to Have You" (1999)

"Beloved" is a song by Australian recording artist Wendy Matthews. It was released in February 1998 as the third and final single from her fourth studio album, Ghosts. The song peaked at number 49 on the Australian charts in September 1998.

== Track listing ==
1. "Beloved" - 4:15
2. "I Lied" - 2:24
3. "Ruins (Jesu, Joy of Man's Desire)" - 4:25

== Charts ==
Chart (1998)	Peak position
Australia (ARIA)	49
