= Crying in the Chapel (Peter Blakeley song) =

Single by Peter Blakeley

from the album Harry's Café De Wheels
- Released: 13 November 1989
- Recorded: 1989
- Genre: Synthpop, pop
- Length: 3:40
- Label: Capitol Records
- Songwriters: Peter Blakeley, Aaron Zigmon
- Producer: Stewart Lavine

Peter Blakeley singles chronology
| "Cattletrain" (1988) | "Crying in the Chapel" (1989) | "Quicksand" (1990) |

"Crying in the Chapel" is a song by Australian pop singer Peter Blakeley. The song was released in November 1989 as the lead single from Blakeley's second studio album, Harry's Café De Wheels (1990). It was Blakeley's first single to receive commercial success, peaking at #3 on the ARIA Singles chart, and was certified Platinum.

At the ARIA Music Awards of 1990, "Crying in the Chapel" won Single of the Year. The song also earned Blakeley a nomination for Best Male Artist and Song of the Year.

== Track listings ==
=== 7" Single ===
- Side A "Crying in the Chapel" - 3:40
- Side B "Caterina" - 3:30

=== 12" Single ===
- Side A "Crying in the Chapel" (The Jungle Mix) - 6:15
- Side B "Crying in the Chapel" (The Jungle Dub)- 5:40

=== CD single ===
1. "Crying in the Chapel" - 3:40
2. "Caterina" - 3:30
3. "Vicious" - 3:50
4. "Crying in the Chapel" (The Jungle Mix) - 6:15

== Charts ==
=== Weekly charts ===
| Chart (1989/90) | Peak position |
|---|---|
| Australia (ARIA) | 3 |
| New Zealand (Recorded Music NZ) | 7 |
| West Germany (GfK) | 57 |

=== Year-end charts ===
| Year-end chart (1990) | Position |
|---|---|
| Australia (ARIA) | 18 |

== Certifications ==
| Region | Certification | Certified units/sales |
|---|---|---|
| Australia (ARIA) | Platinum | 70,000^{^} |
^{^} Shipments figures based on certification alone.
