= Dancing Daze (song) =

Single by Wendy Matthews and Jenny Morris

from the album Dancing Daze
- Released: January 1986
- Recorded: 1985
- Label: ABC Music
- Songwriter(s): Sharon O'Neill
- Producer(s): Martin Armiger

Wendy Matthews singles chronology
"Dancing Daze" (1986)	"Dare to Be Bold" (1986)

Jenny Morris singles chronology
"Get Some Humour" (1985)	"Dancing Daze" (1986)	"You're Gonna Get Hurt" (1986)

"Dancing Daze" is a song written by Sharon O'Neill and performed by Wendy Matthews and Jenny Morris. It was released in January 1986 as the lead single and main theme to the 1986 ABC television miniseries of the same name.

At the ARIA Music Awards of 1987, Wendy Matthews was nominated for Best Female Artist.

== Track listings ==
7" single (K-9897)
No.	Title	Writer(s)	Length
1.	"Dancing Daze" (performed by Wendy Matthews and Jenny Morris)	Sharon O'Neill
2.	"Last Chance To Dance" (performed by Martin Armiger)	Martin Armiger

12" single (X 14275)
No.	Title	Writer(s)	Length
1.	"Dancing Daze (Remix)" (performed by Wendy Matthews and Jenny Morris)	Sharon O'Neill
2.	"Dancing Daze (7" version)" (performed by Wendy Matthews and Jenny Morris)	Sharon O'Neill
3.	"Last Chance To Dance" (performed by Martin Armiger)	Martin Armiger
