= Beautiful View =

Studio album by Wendy Matthews
- Released: 7 May 2001
- Recorded: 2000
- Genre: Pop
- Length: 44:09
- Label: BMG
- Producer: Michael Szumowski

Wendy Matthews chronology
Stepping Stones (1999)	Beautiful View (2001)	Café Naturale (2004)

Singles from Beautiful View
- 1. "Free" Released: November 2000; 2. "Beautiful View" Released: 7 May 2001; 3. "Like the Sun" Released: October 2001

Beautiful View is the fifth studio album released by Australian singer Wendy Matthews released by BMG in Australia on 7 May 2001. It yielded three singles "Free", "Beautiful View" and "Like the Sun".

Matthews wrote the majority of the album on the north coast of New South Wales, Australia. She chose the name "Beautiful View" for the album because she wanted to "link it [the album] to this special place where I can look to the islands in winter and watch the whales frolicking in the ocean."

== Track listing ==
1. "Like the Sun" (Matthews, R. Reid, Michael Szumowski) – 4:16
2. "Free" (S. Peiken, G. Wells) – 3:54
3. "Beautiful View" (Greg Arnold, Cameron McKenzie) – 2:57
4. "Hollow Boy" (Matthews, Reid, Szumowski) – 4:08
5. "Roll Away the Stone" (Matthews, Reid, Szumowski) – 3:28
6. "No Vacancy" (Matthews, G. Skinner) – 4:27
7. "Maybe" – 3:52
8. "Right Now" – 3:38
9. "Waiting" (Mark Duffy) – 4:17
10. "Unravelling" – 4:45
11. "My Boy Before" (Paul Kelly, Matthews, Szumowski) – 4:27

Bonus CD

1. "I've Got to Have You" (3AM mix) – 4:14
2. "These Streets" (Sorry's mix) – 5:02
3. "Day by Day" (Last Suppers mix) – 4:56
4. "If Only I Could" (Timebomb mix) – 5:45
5. "Beautiful View" (View from Ashfield mix) – 4:32

== Charts ==
Chart (2001)	Peak position
Australian Albums (ARIA)	36
