= Joy Smithers =

Australian actress

- Born: 15 July 1963 (age 63); Australia
- Occupations: Actress, news presenter

Joy Smithers (born 15 July 1963) is an Australian actress, best known for her acting performances on television, and her role as a television news presenter, such as with MTV Australia in the late 1980s.

Her credits include: All The Way, Bangkok Hilton, The Flying Doctors, Home and Away, Lorca and the Outlaws, Wildside and All Saints. For a short time she was co-host of Good Morning Australia. In September 2008 Smithers made a return to acting, as Bridget Simmons in Home and Away.

Smithers appeared in the 2008 Australian surfing film Newcastle, as well as the 2015 action film Mad Max: Fury Road. At the age of 15, Smithers was offered the role of Max Rockatansky's wife, Jessie, in the original 1979 Mad Max, but was forced to decline after her parents would not let her travel to Adelaide for production.

== Filmography ==
=== Film ===
Year	Title	Role	Type
1982	Heatwave	Model	Feature film
1983	Stanley: Every Home Should Have One (aka Stanley)	Patty Norris	Feature film
1984	Lorca and the Outlaws (aka Starship / 2084)	Lena	Feature film
1985	Emoh Ruo	Terri Tunkley	Feature film
1985	Rebel	Mary - All Girl Band	Feature film
1987	Belinda	Liz	Feature film
1993	The Custodian	Helen Quinlan	Feature film
1994	The Seventh Floor	Tracey	Feature film
1994	Gino		Feature film
1995	Sex Is a Four Letter Word	Sylvia	Feature film
1995	Lucinda, 31	Lucinda	Film short
1996	River Street	Marcia	Feature film
1997	Little White Lies	Reb	Film short
1997	Heart of Fire	Julie Stoler	TV movie (US)
2004	Love In The First Degree (aka Straight to You)	Leslie Barrett	Feature film
2008	Newcastle	Flora	Feature film
2010	Lest We Forget	Bell	Film short
2012	Status Update: A Facebook Fairytale	Genevieve	Film short
2015	Mad Max: Fury Road	The Vuvalini	Feature film
2021	Step Into Paradise	Herself (with sister Sue Smithers)	Feature film documentary

=== Television ===
Year	Title	Role	Type
1983	Alpha Street		TV pilot
1983	Waterloo Station	Guest role	TV series, 1 episode
1983-85	Class of 83, 84, 85	Host	TV series
1983	An Open Go	Voice	Film documentary
1984	Making a Video Program	Presenter	Film documentary
1985	Out There	Host	TV series
1986	Alice to Nowhere	Betty Spencer	TV miniseries, 2 episodes
1986, 1990	The Flying Doctors	Kerry Samuelson / Claire Banks / Claire Dobson	TV series, 3 episodes
1987	MTV	Co-host	TV series
1987, 1988	Hey Hey It's Saturday	Herself ("Red Faces" segment)	TV series, 1 episode
1988, 1988	Hey Hey It's Saturday	Herself (with Eurogliders singing "It Must Be Love")	TV series, 1 episode
1988	All the Way	Gillian Porter	TV miniseries, 3 episodes
1988	Stringer		TV series
1988	Hey Hey It's Saturday	Herself (with Eurogliders singing "Listen")	TV series, 1 episode
1989	Bangkok Hilton	Mandy Engels	TV miniseries, 3 episodes
1989	Bodysurfer	Lydia	TV miniseries, 2 episodes
1990	Burke's Backyard	Guest Celebrity Gardener	TV series, 1 episode
1990	Tonight Live with Steve Vizard	Guest	TV series, 1 episode
1990	Insiders	Herself	TV series, 1 episode
1991	E Street	Helen McCarthur	TV series, 2 episodes
1991	Super Saturday	Herself	TV series, 1 episode
1992	In Sydney Today	Guest	TV series, 1 episode
1992, 1995	G.P.	Carmen Plant / Sgt. Sue 'Dusty' Miller	TV series, 2 episodes
1992, 1997-98	Good Morning Australia	Guest host	TV series, 1 episode
1992	The Shorn Sheep Show	Host	TV series
1993	Cartoon Connection	Host	TV series, 5 episodes
1993	Newlyweds	Amanda	TV series, 1 episode
1994	At Home	Guest	TV series, 1 episode
1994, 1997, 2008	Home and Away	Cathy / Paula Rogers / Bridget Simmons	TV series, 16 episodes
1994-1995	Heartbreak High	Karen Cooper / Cassandra	TV series, 4 episodes
1994	Denton	Guest	TV series, 1 episode
1994	Live It Up	Guest	TV series, 1 episode
1995	Blue Murder	Debra Smith	TV miniseries, 2 episodes
1996	English - Have A Go	Presenter	TV series
1996	Alternatives	Voice	TV documentary
1996	Monday to Friday	Guest	TV series, 1 episode
1996	Water Rats	Gabi Cunningham	TV series, 1 episode
1997	Australia's Strangest Home Improvements	Presenter	TV series
1997-98	Good Morning Australia	Guest	TV series, 2 episodes
1997	The Lacemaker: An Australian In Paris	Herself	TV special
1998	Denise	Guest	TV series, 1 episode
1999	Big Sky	Grace	TV series, 1 episode
1999	Wildside	Natasha Lodans	TV series, 1 episode
1999-2003	All Saints	Rose Stevens / Rose Carlton	TV series, 57 episodes
2001	The Royal Children's Hospital Variety Gala	Herself	TV special
2001	The Weakest Link	Contestant	TV series, 1 episode
2002	Beauty and the Beast	Herself	TV series, 1 episode
2002	The Best Of Aussie Cop Shows	Herself	TV special
2004	The Cooks	Freya Davies	TV series, 1 episode
2006	When Actors Go Bad	Herself	Short Video
2008	Mornings with Kerri-Anne	Guest	TV series, 1 episode
2009	The Making of 'Newcastle'	Herself	Video
2012	The Morning Show	Guest	TV series, 1 episode
2013-14	Wonderland	Felicity Philips	TV series, 4 episodes
2014, 2015	The Daily Edition	Guest (with sister Sue Smithers)	TV series, 2 episodes
2021	Amazing Grace	Maureen	TV series, 2 episodes
