= Illusion (musical) =

- Music: Martin Armiger
- Lyrics: Peter Carey and Martin Armiger
- Book: Peter Carey and Mike Mullins
- Productions: 1986 Adelaide

Illusion is an Australian rock musical by Peter Carey and Mike Mullins with songs by Carey and Martin Armiger, first performed at the Adelaide Festival of the Arts in 1986.

== Plot ==
Setting: Sydney, Australia

The story, a critique of American influences on Australian life through a 'surrealistic pantomime', concerns Travis the Private Eye. Carboni, the Common Man, a newspaper seller, tries to persuade Travis to track down the Glowing Man. Along the way Travis encounters politicians, the Church, the judiciary, the media, big business, police, criminals, junkies and others.

== Production history ==
Mullins had conceived the concept for Illusion in the early 1980 as the third part of a trilogy of experimental performance.

The musical was first performed for the Adelaide Festival of the Arts from 7 to 22 March 1986 at the Regent Theatre, Adelaide, directed by Mullins. The premiere production, one of the major works of the festival, experienced substantial difficulties. Carey withdrew his name as author of the book and retained only a credit for co-writing the lyrics. Following the first performance, three performances were cancelled during which the musical was reworked.

== Recording ==
A studio cast recording was released by ABC Records in 1986, featuring Wendy Matthews, Mark Williams, Peter Blakeley, Sherlie Matthews and Armiger. It was nominated for an ARIA Award for Best Original Soundtrack or Cast Recording in 1987. The songs "Must Be Chemical" and "When I Was a Little Boy" from the album performed by Peter Blakeley were released as a single.

=== Track listing ===
Side A

1. "Must Be Chemical" (vocals by Peter Blakeley)
2. "Yellowcake" (vocals by Sherlie Matthews)
3. "When I Was a Little Boy" (vocals by Peter Blakeley)
4. "Nice Warm Anger" (vocals by Mark Williams)
5. "There's Going to Be a Future" (vocals by Mark Williams & Sherlie Matthews)

Side B

1. "Metaphorically Speaking" (vocals by Wendy Matthews)
2. "No Interest" (vocals by Martin Armiger)
3. "The Glowing Man" (by Ulpia Erdos)
4. "The Defense" (vocals by Mark Williams)
5. "The Beat Begins" (vocals by Sherlie Matthews & Wendy Matthews)
6. "Only Half a Life" (vocals by Mark Williams & Wendy Matthews)
