= The Welcome Fire =

Studio album by Wendy Matthews
- Released: 13 August 2013
- Recorded: 2012−2013
- Genre: Pop
- Length: 35:59
- Labels: Ambition Entertainment; EMI Music
- Producer: John Castle

Wendy Matthews chronology
She (2008)	The Welcome Fire (2013)

Singles from The Welcome Fire
- 1. "Amelia" Released: 2013

The Welcome Fire is the eighth studio album by Australian singer Wendy Matthews, released on 13 August 2013. It is Matthews' first original album in 12 years. She co-wrote tracks along with Josh Pyke, Megan Washington, Mark Sholtez, Rod McCormack, John Castle, Kim Richey, Anthony Egizii and David Musumeci.

== Review ==
Ross Clelland from The Music AU said "[that] while these are mostly graceful adult pop songs, there is some intelligence and wit to the second guesses of "Keeping My Distance", or the typical thoughtful swing of "Everything I've Done Wrong". Her voice still feels and aches, and draws you in. Just classy."

A staff writer from 'Out in Perth' said "Featuring 10 solid tracks of contemporary adult music, the album is a consistent offering of quality tunes that it easy to play through from start to finish without reaching for the forward button any stage."

== Track listing ==
1. Follow You Down - 3:45
2. Amelia - 4:00
3. Feel Like Taking Your Man - 3:54
4. Little Boy - 3:06
5. It Won't Matter - 3:29
6. Keeping My Distance - 3:50
7. 415 Wilson Street - 3:27
8. Everything I've Done Wrong - 2:55
9. Who I Am - 4:15
10. It’s Alright - 3:28

== Charts ==
Chart (2013)	Peak position
Australian Albums (ARIA)	31
