= Let's Kiss (Like Angels Do) =

1991 single by Wendy Matthews

Single by Wendy Matthews

from the album Émigré
- Released: 8 April 1991
- Length: 3:29
- Label: rooART
- Songwriter(s): Cal Curtis, Jud Friedman
- Producer(s): Ricky Fataar

Wendy Matthews singles chronology
"Woman's Gotta Have It" (1991)	"Let's Kiss (Like Angels Do)" (1991)	"The Day You Went Away" (1992)

"Let's Kiss (Like Angels Do)" is a song by Australian recording artist Wendy Matthews. It was released in April 1991 as the third and final single from Matthew's debut solo studio album, Émigré. The song peaked at number 14 on the Australian ARIA Singles Chart. At the ARIA Music Awards of 1992, it earned Matthews a nomination for Best Female Artist.

== Track listings ==
CD and 7-inch single

1. "Let's Kiss (Like Angels Do)"
2. "I See the Light"

CD and 12-inch single

1. "Let's Kiss (Like Angels Do)" (Heavenly mix)
2. "I See the Light"
3. "Let's Kiss (Like Angels Do)"
4. "Woman's Gotta Have It" (acoustic)

== Charts ==
Chart (1991)	Peak position
Australia (ARIA)	14
