= Here's Looking Up Your Address =

Studio album by Absent Friends
- Released: 6 April 1990
- Recorded: 1989
- Studio: Paradise Studios, Rhinoceros Studios, Sydney, Australia
- Genre: Rock
- Label: RooART
- Producer: Garry Beers, Sean Kelly

Absent Friends chronology
Here's Looking Up Your Address (1990)	Networking (1990)

Singles from Here's Looking Up Your Address
- 1. "Hallelujah" Released: November 1989; 2. "Hullabaloo" Released: February 1990; 3. "I Don't Want to Be with Nobody but You" Released: April 1990; 4. "Harmony" Released: August 1990

Here's Looking Up Your Address is the debut studio album by Australian rock band Absent Friends. It was released in April 1990 and peaked at number 7 on the ARIA Charts and was certified gold.

== Track listing ==
All songs written by S. Kelly except where noted, according to Australasian Performing Right Association (APRA).

1. "Hullabaloo" (S. Kelly, J. Mackay) - 4:17
2. "Mean Streak" - 3:40
3. "Sister" - 3:59
4. "Hallelujah" (12") - 4:41
5. "Everybody Up" (S. Kelly, J. Mackay) - 4:16
6. "I Don't Want to Be with Nobody but You" (Eddie Floyd) - 4:47
7. "Come Clean" (S. Kelly, G. Beers) - 4:12
8. "The Water Is Wide" (Traditional) - 5:10
9. "Harmony" - 4:38
10. "I Had a Premonition" - 4:23
11. "Pomona's Place" - 3:01
12. "Clemency" (S.Kelly, G. Beers) - 4:26
13. "Here's Looking Up Your Address" (M. King) - 1:31
14. "Thank You Goodnight" - 5:05
15. "Hallelujah" (Choruses) - 3:39

== Charts ==
=== Weekly charts ===
Chart (1990)	Peak position
Australian Albums (ARIA)	7

=== Year-end charts ===
Chart (1990)	Position
Australian Albums (ARIA)	80

== Certification ==
Region	Certification	Certified units/sales
Australia (ARIA)	Gold	35,000^{^}
^{^} Shipments figures based on certification alone.

== Personnel ==
=== Musicians ===
Absent Friends

- Sean Kelly - guitar, keyboards, vocals
- Wendy Matthews - vocals
- Garry Beers - bass, vocals
- John Mackay - drums, percussion, synth.
- James Valentine - saxophone, clarinet, organ
- Michael King - guitar, vocals
- Nicole Ainslie - keyboards, organ, vocals
- Andrew Duffield - keyboards

More Friends

- Roger Mason - keyboards, synthesiser
- Peter Blakeley - vocals
- Jon Farriss - drums, percussion

=== Production ===
- Axolotl & Laz - Artwork
- Nick Mainsbridge - Engineer
- Sean Kelly - Producer
- Garry Beers - Producer
