= Peter Blakeley =

Background information
- Born: Peter Blakeley; 2 December 1960 (age 65); Sydney, Australia
- Genre: Soul
- Occupations: Musician, singer-songwriter, performer
- Instruments: Vocals, guitar
- Years active: 1978–present
- Labels: Truetone; Capitol; Giant
- Website: peterblakeley.com

Peter Blakeley is an Australian white soul/adult contemporary singer and songwriter.

Blakeley was a lead singer of the Rockmelons in the mid-1980s. He launched a solo career in 1987 and had a massive hit single in Australia in 1989 with "Crying in the Chapel", which was not a remake of the 1950s song "Crying in the Chapel". In 1990, he won an ARIA award for Single of the Year with "Crying in the Chapel:, the first single taken from his album Harry's Café De Wheels. The song went platinum in 1990.

Ian McFarlane, rock music journalist and author of Encyclopedia of Australian Rock and Pop (1999) wrote: "Peter Blakeley has been described by the founder of Atlantic Records Ahmet Ertegun, as 'The finest White Soul singer I have ever heard.'"

== 1978–1987: Early years ==
Peter Blakeley's earliest breakthrough came when he was invited by Richard Clapton to accompany him on an Australian national tour in 1978. Clapton would prove to be an important mentor in the early years. By this stage, Blakeley was closely involved with Sydney's music scene, which was at that time concentrated in the inner-city suburbs of Darlinghurst and Kings Cross.

Peter was involved with a number of line-ups between 1979 and 1984 including, Peter Black and The Reds (1980), The Blakeley Trio with Steve Stewart (Slime Men, Surry Hillbillies) and Denis Meagher, PM with Chris Bailey and Malcolm Green, Rat Tat Tat (1984) with Geoff Stapleton, Paul Abrahams, Jeff Raglus, Viola Dana and The Starlight Wranglers (1984) and Paris Green (1984).

The next phase of Blakeley's career prior to him forming Peter Blakeley & The Resurrection, was a spell as featured vocalist with pioneer pop/electronic outfit The Rockmelons. Peter can be heard on their second single "Sweat It Out" released on the Truetone Records label in 1985. Around this time, Peter also began performing and recording with Wendy Matthews, an affiliation which would continue through to the 1990 release of the Absent Friends single "I Don't Want to Be with Nobody but You" which featured Blakeley on backing vocals.

Peter Blakeley's commercial profile began to rise with the formation of Peter Blakeley & The Resurrection in 1986. This line-up included Wendy Matthews, Mark Punch, Hughie Benjamin, Paul Abrahams and Peter Kekel. With this line-up, Blakeley supported a number of international touring acts including Eric Clapton, the majority of the material presented in his live set at this stage was later recorded and released on the 1987 mini-album Vicious. Two singles were released during 1986, "Must Be Chemical" and a cover of Marvin Gaye's "Ain't That Peculiar".

"Must Be Chemical" and another song, "When I Was a Little Boy" were included on the soundtrack of the stage musical Illusion which was released towards the end of 1986 by ABC music. Illusion was commissioned by the Adelaide Festival of Arts and featured words from noted Australian author Peter Carey arranged to music by composer Martin Armiger. The single "Must Be Chemical" b/w "When I Was a Little Boy" was Blakeley's debut solo release for the Truetone label.

Vicious was produced by the renowned Ricky Fataar (well known for his work with The Beach Boys, Bonnie Raitt and The Monitors) and released through the Truetone Records label. Two singles lifted from this record, "Caterina" and "Bye Bye Baby" received support from commercial radio as did the album track Cattle Train. This album was later released for the American market as The Truetone Sessions by Capitol Records in 1988.

== 1988–1994 : Commercial success ==
Peter Blakeley moved to Los Angeles in 1988 to sign with Capitol Records in the US. The first US release was 'The Truetone Sessions' in 1988 on Capitol Records. In 1989, he released the album Harry's Café De Wheels, which was executive produced by Peter Asher.

Artists involved with the album included Linda Ronstadt, Siedah Garrett, Wendy Matthews and Andrew Gold, in addition to legendary session musicians such as Jeff Porcaro, Jim Keltner and Larry Klein. The lead single "Crying in the Chapel" was produced by Stewart Levine who worked extensively with Simply Red. Harry's Café De Wheels spawned a total of four singles including, "Crying in the Chapel", "Quicksand", "The First Time Ever I Saw Your Face", and "You Never Heard It From Me". The album was well received and highly successful, especially in Australia and Europe.

Towards the end of 1989, Blakeley contributed vocals to some of the tracks on Cher's Heart of Stone album. This release was also produced by Peter Asher and featured musical contributions from a number of people involved in the recording of the Harry's Café De Wheels album including, Andrew Gold, Frank Wolf, and Waddy Wachtel.

In 1990 he worked briefly with the Australian group Absent Friends which featured Wendy Matthews as lead vocalist. Blakeley provided the backing vocal and harmony on the song "I Don't Want to Be with Nobody but You" which peaked at number 4 in the Australian charts in May of that year. He was also instrumental in the band's arrangement and selection of the song. The single was the most successful song released by the Absent Friends and was lifted from the album Here's Looking Up Your Address.

In 1990, Blakeley recorded a cover of the 1965 song For Your Love by The Yardbirds for the various artists' soundtrack album for the Australian film The Crossing.

Between 1990 and 1991 Blakeley embarked on two world tours which took in the US, UK, Australia and Western Europe to promote the release of the Harry's Café De Wheels record. Members of Blakeley's touring band during this time included Teenie Hodges, Hopeton Hibbert, Junior Baillie, Roger Mason, Ron Francois and Deni Hines. By this stage, the single "Crying in the Chapel" had charted on the Billboard Adult Contemporary charts in the US and received significant radio support across Europe. Subsequent singles released from the album also charted in Australia.

Blakeley's follow up record The Pale Horse was released in 1993 by Giant/Warner in America. The album represented a different musical direction for Blakeley and incorporated stronger elements of Funk and Blues than Harry's Café De Wheels while still retaining a distinctive Soul sound. The album was recorded at the Paisley Park Studios in the US owned by Prince and included members of the New Power Generation on some of the tracks. The record was produced by Jeff Aldrich, David Z and Andrew Gold. David Z at that time had recently had major chart success with his production of The Fine Young Cannibals song "She Drives Me Crazy".

One of the songs from the album Be Thankful for What You've Got was used in the opening sequence of the film The Taking of Beverly Hills, the two singles released from the album were "I've Been Lonely" and "God's Little Elvis".

== Discography ==
=== Albums ===
- Vicious – True Tone (1987)
- Harry's Café De Wheels – Capitol (1990)
- The Pale Horse – Giant (1993)

== Awards and nominations ==
=== APRA Awards ===
The APRA Awards are held in Australia and New Zealand by the Australasian Performing Right Association to recognise songwriting skills, sales and airplay performance by its members annually.

Year	Nominee / work	Award	Result
1989/90	"Crying in the Chapel"	Most Performed Australasian Popular Work	Won

=== ARIA Music Awards ===
The ARIA Music Awards is an annual awards ceremony that recognises excellence, innovation, and achievement across all genres of Australian music.

Year	Nominee / work	Award	Result
1990	"Crying in the Chapel"	Single of the Year	Won
1990	"Crying in the Chapel"	Best Male Artist	Nominated
1990	"Crying in the Chapel"	Song of the Year	Nominated
1991	Harry's Café De Wheels	Best Male Artist	Nominated
1991	Harry's Café De Wheels	Best Cover Art	Nominated
