= Absent Friends (band) =

Australian band

- Also known as: Sean Kelly and His Absent Friends
- Origin: Sydney, New South Wales, Australia
- Years active: 1989–1990
- Labels: rooArt
- Past members: Sean Kelly; James Valentine; Garry Gary Beers; Geoffrey Stapleton; Wendy Matthews; Michael King; John Mackay; Ron Francois

Absent Friends were an Australian band from Sydney. The band was relatively short lived, forming in 1989 and disbanding in 1990. It featured a number of notable Australian musicians including Sean Kelly (Models, The Dukes), Andrew Duffield, James Valentine (both also ex-Models), Garry Gary Beers (INXS), Geoffrey Stapleton (GANGgajang) and Wendy Matthews.

== Biography ==
Following the break-up of Models in 1988, Sean Kelly attempted to launch a solo career with the single "Thank You, Goodnight" (March 1988) (which happened to be the name of Models' last tour), but the single was not a commercial success and in early 1989 Kelly found himself at a loose end. Kelly contacted a number of friends, with a view of putting together an informal band to play a few gigs. The impromptu cooperative was initially dubbed Sean Kelly and His Absent Friends. The initial line-up varied, usually dependent upon the availability of individual members at any given time. Sean Kelly and His Absent Friends kicked off life as a touring act in May 1989, with Kelly (vocals/guitar) joined on occasion by his partner Wendy Matthews (vocals)(who performed backing vocals for Models and was a guest vocalist on the Rockmelons debut and ARIA award winning album, Tales of the City), Garry Gary Beers (the bassist for INXS), Nicole Ainslie (keyboards/vocals), Andrew Duffield (keyboards) ex-Models, James Valentine (saxophone) ex-Models, Danglin' Brothers guitarist Michael King ex-Jimmy Barnes, and drummer John Mackay ex-Machinations. Within a couple of months the high-profile group were supporting Crowded House at their July 1989 'Rock For Land Rights' concert.

In late 1989 the band entered the recording studio to record a few original tracks that they had been playing live. The first single released by the newly named Absent Friends was "Hallelujah" in November 1989. The single peaked at number 100 on the ARIA Charts in January 1990. In March 1990, a second single titled "Hullabaloo" was released and peaked at number 46 on the Australian charts.

The album, Here's Looking Up Your Address was released on rooArt in April 1990 and peaked at number 7 on the ARIA Charts.

The album's third single, "I Don't Want to Be with Nobody but You" was a significant commercial success. It is a cover of the 1976 Dorothy Moore song, written by Eddie Floyd. "I Don't Want to Be with Nobody but You" peaked at number 4 on the Australian charts in July 1990 and was certified gold. At the ARIA Music Awards of 1991, the song won the ARIA Award for Best Single. The album yielded one more minor hit with "Harmony" reaching number 92 on the Australian singles charts. The band toured Australian throughout 1990, out of which a promotion live EP, Networking Live was reordered.

Later in 1990, Absent Friends supported INXS on an eight-week European tour, with ex-Eurogliders bassist Ron Francois taking Beers' place and GANGgajang keyboardist Geoff Stapleton filling the void on keyboards left by the departure of Duffield. Ainslie and Valentine also left the band at this time. The band played 10,000 seat stadiums through Sweden, Switzerland, Italy, France, Spain, the Netherlands, Denmark, Scotland, Ireland and England (including five performances at Wembley Arena).

Soon after Kelly decided that Absent Friends had run its course, and the band members went their separate ways.

Matthews soon after recorded her debut album, Émigré, whilst Kelly and Stapleton pieced together another band during 1991 called The Dukes.

== Members ==
- Wendy Matthews – lead/vocal (1989–1990)
- Sean Kelly – lead vocal/guitar (1989–1990)
- Michael "Mick" King – lead guitar/vocal (1989–1990)
- Garry Gary Beers – bass/vocal (1989–1990)
- Ron Francois – bass/vocal (1990)
- John Mackay – drums/percussion/keyboards/vocal (1989–1990)
- Geoffrey Stapleton – keyboards (1990)
- James Valentine – saxophone (1989)
- Andrew Duffield – keyboards (1989)
- Nicole Ainslie – keyboards/vocal (1989)

== Discography ==
=== Studio albums ===
Year	Album details	Peak chart positions	Certifications (sales thresholds)
Year	Album details	AUS	Certifications (sales thresholds)
1990	Here's Looking Up Your Address: Released: April 1990; Label: rooArt (842828-2); Formats: CD, cassette, LP	7	ARIA: Gold

=== Extended plays ===
Year	Album details
1990	Networking Live: Released: December 1990; Label: rooArt (878671-1); Formats: 12" LP

=== Singles ===
List of singles, with selected chart positions and certifications
Title	Year	Peak chart positions	Certifications	Album
Title	Year	AUS	Certifications	Album
"Hallelujah"	1989	100		Here's Looking Up Your Address
"Hullabaloo"	1990	46		Here's Looking Up Your Address
"I Don't Want to Be with Nobody but You" (as Absent Friends featuring Wendy Matthews)	1990	4	ARIA: Gold	Here's Looking Up Your Address
"Harmony"	1990	92		Here's Looking Up Your Address

== Awards and nominations ==
=== ARIA Music Awards ===
The ARIA Music Awards is an annual awards ceremony that recognises excellence, innovation, and achievement across all genres of Australian music. Lewis has won three awards from 14 nominations.

Year	Nominee / work	Award	Result
1991	"I Don't Want to Be with Nobody but You"	Single of the Year	Won
1991	"I Don't Want to Be with Nobody but You"	Breakthrough Artist – Single	Nominated
1991	Here's Looking Up Your Address	Breakthrough Artist – Album	Nominated
