= Harry's Café De Wheels =

Studio album by Peter Blakeley
- Released: 28 November 1989
- Recorded: 1988−89
- Studio: The Hop, Conway Studios, The Complex, Summa Recording Studios, Ocean Way Recording Studios; Los Angeles
- Genre: Soft Rock; funk; pop rock
- Length: 43:41
- Label: Capitol Records
- Producer: Peter Asher; Stewart Levine

Peter Blakeley chronology
Vicious (1987)	Harry's Café De Wheels (1989)	The Pale Horse (1993)

Singles from Harry's Café De Wheels
- 1. "Crying in the Chapel" Released: 13 November 1989; 2. "The First Time Ever I Saw Your Face" Released: March 1990; 3. "Quicksand" Released: 30 April 1990; 4. "You Never Heard It from Me" Released: June 1990

Professional ratings
Review scores
Source	Rating
AllMusic	2/5 stars

Harry's Café De Wheels is the second studio album by Australian singer Peter Blakeley. The album was released in November 1989 by Capitol Records.

At the ARIA Music Awards of 1991, the album was nominated for Best Cover Art. Blakeley was nominated for Best Male Artist.

== Track listing ==
No.	Title	Writer(s)	Length
1.	"Crying in the Chapel"	Peter Blakeley, Aaron Zigman	3:43
2.	"Quicksand"	Blakeley	3:59
3.	"You Never Heard It From Me"	Blakeley	3:38
4.	"First Time Ever I Saw Your Face"	Ewan MacColl	4:19
5.	"Heaven is Calling"	Blakeley, Zigman	4:10
6.	"Who Let My Secret Out"	Blakeley	4:17
7.	"Stranger in My Own Hometown"	Blakeley	3:41
8.	"There Must Be Something I Can Do"	Blakeley	3:57
9.	"Working for a Living"	Blakeley	4:07
10.	"Lost on the River"	Blakeley	4:38
11.	"Quicksand" (reprise)	Blakeley	3:49

== Charts ==
=== Weekly charts ===
Chart (1990)	Peak position
Australian Albums (ARIA)	3
New Zealand Albums (RMNZ)	35

=== Year-end charts ===
Chart (1990)	Peak position
Australian Albums (ARIA)	21

== Certifications ==
Region	Certification	Certified units/sales
Australia (ARIA)	Platinum	70,000^{^}
^{^} Shipments figures based on certification alone.
