= Standing Strong =

1994 single by Wendy Matthews

Single by Wendy Matthews

from the album The Witness Tree
- Released: 12 September 1994
- Studio: The Plant Recording (San Francisco, California)
- Length: 4:56
- Label: rooART
- Songwriters: Wendy Matthews, Glenn Skinner
- Producer: Booker T. Jones

Wendy Matthews singles chronology
"T.K.O." (1993)	"Standing Strong" (1994)	"Love Will Keep Me Alive" (1995)

"Standing Strong" is a song by Australian recording artist Wendy Matthews. It was released in September 1994 as the lead single from her third studio album, The Witness Tree. The song peaked at number 37 on the Australian ARIA Singles Chart. At the APRA Music Awards of 1995, the song won Most Performed Australian Work.

== Track listing ==
1. "Standing Strong" – 4:56
2. "Waiting in Vain" (live) – 5:28
3. "Iroquois Lullaby" (live) – 2:59

== Charts ==
Chart (1994–1995)	Peak position
Australia (ARIA)	37
Canada Adult Contemporary (RPM)	27
