= Token Angels =

Single by Wendy Matthews

from the album Émigré
- Released: 3 September 1990
- Genre: Pop
- Length: 4:53
- Label: RooART
- Songwriter(s): Roger Mason
- Producer(s): Ricky Fataar

Wendy Matthews singles chronology
"I Don't Want to Be with Nobody but You" (1990)	"Token Angels" (1990)	"Woman's Gotta Have It" (1991)

"Token Angels" is a song by Australian recording artist Wendy Matthews. It was released in September 1990 as the lead single from her debut solo studio album, Émigré.

At the ARIA Music Awards of 1991, the song won the ARIA Award for Breakthrough Artist - Single.

Matthews subsequently included the song on her 1999 greatest hits album, Stepping Stones, and her 2007 compilation album, The Essential Wendy Matthews.

== Track listing ==
CD Maxi / 12" single

1. "Token Angels" - 4:53
2. "Iroquois Lullaby"
3. "Fruit Bearing Tree"

== Charts ==
Chart (1990)	Peak position
Australia (ARIA)	18
