= Garry Gary Beers =

Australian musician

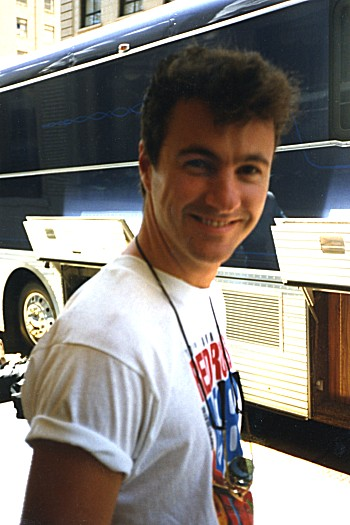
- Garry Gary Beers, August 1986

Background information
- Born: Garry William Beers; 22 June 1957 (age 69); Sydney, New South Wales, Australia
- Genres: New wave; rock
- Occupations: Musician; songwriter; producer
- Instruments: Bass guitar; vocals
- Years active: 1975–present
- Formerly of: INXS; Absent Friends

Garry William Beers (born 22 June 1957), known as Garry Gary Beers, is an Australian musician who was the bass guitarist for the rock group INXS.

== Career ==
Garry William Beers grew up in the Sydney suburb of Manly and attended The Forest High School.

Beers and Andrew Farriss formed the band Dr Dolphin, which was followed by the Farriss Brothers in 1977. Farriss Brothers became INXS in 1979 with Beers on bass guitar and double bass, Andrew Farriss on keyboards and guitar, Jon Farriss on drums and keyboards, Tim Farriss on lead guitar, Michael Hutchence on lead vocals and Kirk Pengilly on guitar, saxophone and backing vocals.

In 1989, while on hiatus from INXS, Beers joined Absent Friends as bass guitarist. Their No. 7 album, Here's Looking Up Your Address (May 1990) spawned the No. 4 hit single, "I Don't Want To Be With Nobody But You". He also plays the guitar, keyboards, and ukulele. Beers has co-written tracks for INXS including "Listen Like Thieves", "Don't Change", and "Perfect Strangers".

Beers co-wrote the song "Tangle With Your Mind" with Scott Weiland of Stone Temple Pilots for Weiland's solo CD Happy in Galoshes (2008).

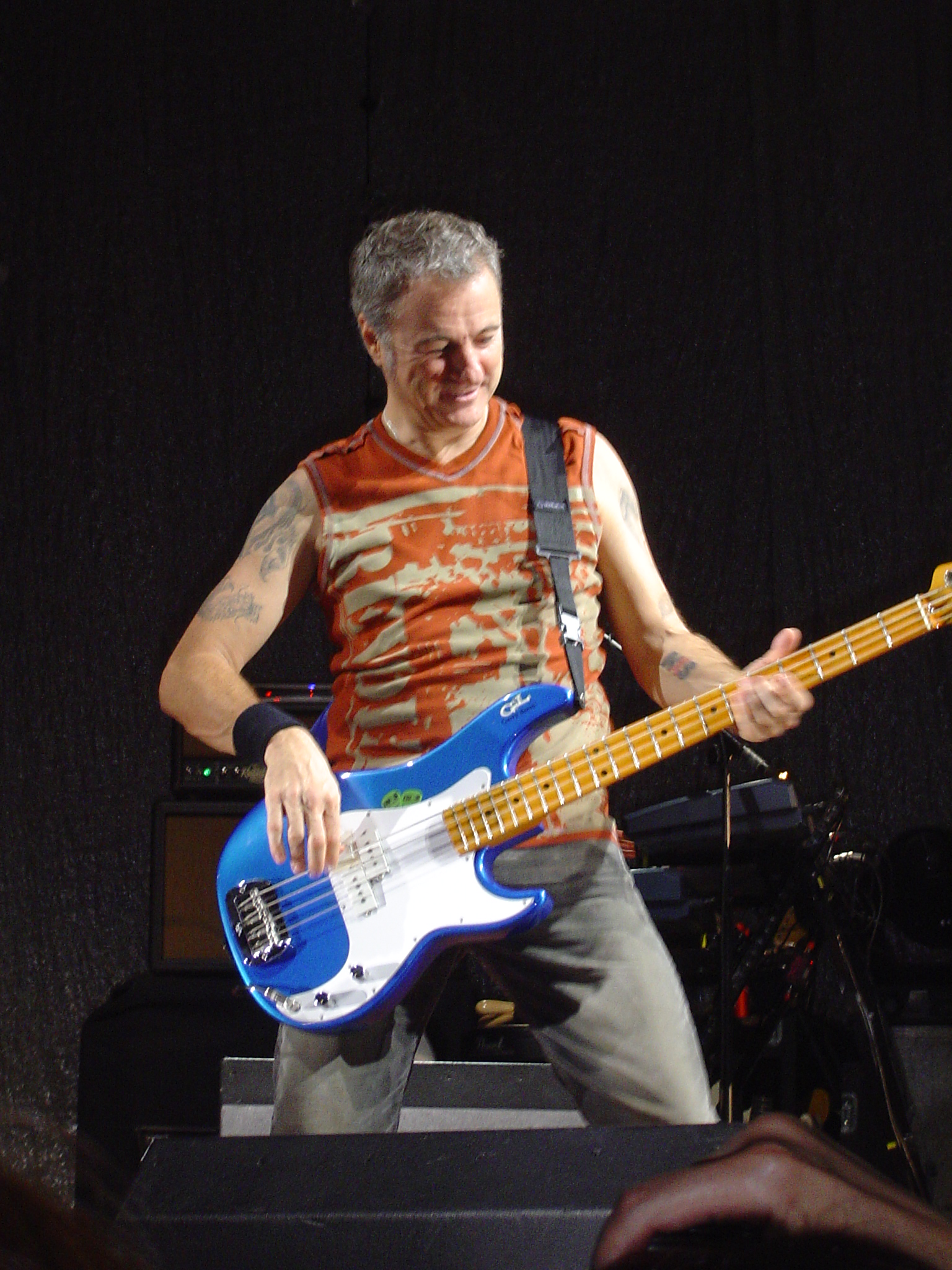
Garry Beers: INXS UK Tour, Brighton June 2007

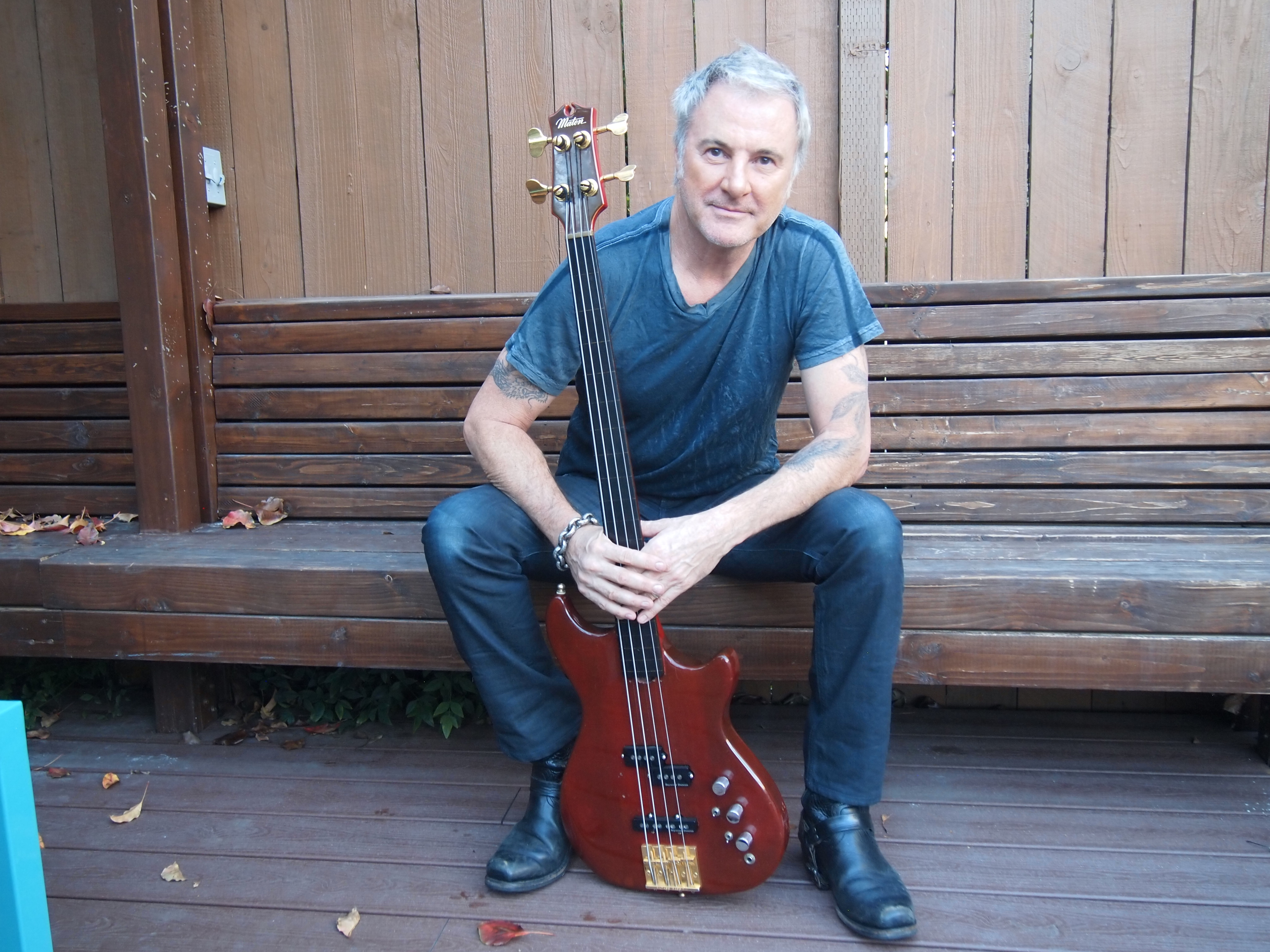
Garry Beers in January 2016
