= Wendy Matthews =

Australian singer

- Born: Wendy Joan Matthews; 13 January 1960 (age 66); Montreal, Quebec, Canada
- Genre: Pop
- Occupations: Singer-songwriter, performer
- Instrument: Vocals
- Years active: 1976–present
- Labels: Alfa; ABC; rooArt; Atlantic; BMG; Warner

Wendy Joan Matthews (born 13 January 1960) is a Canadian-born Australian singer-songwriter who has been a member of Models and Absent Friends and is a solo artist. She released Top 20 hit singles in the 1990s including "Token Angels", "Let's Kiss (Like Angels Do)", "The Day You Went Away" and "Friday's Child" with Top 20 albums, You've Always Got The Blues (duet album with Kate Ceberano), Émigré, Lily, The Witness Tree and her compilation, Stepping Stones. She has won six Australian Recording Industry Association (ARIA) Awards. According to rock music historian, Ian McFarlane she provides "extraordinary, crystal-clear vocals [...] a soulfulness that was the mark of a truly gifted singer".

Matthews appeared on three series of It Takes Two—an Australian TV celebrity singing competition—partnered with Richard Champion (2006), Russell Gilbert (2007) and John Mangos (2008). On 27 October 2010, Models were inducted into the ARIA Hall of Fame by Matthews.

== Biography ==
=== 1960–1981: early years ===
Wendy Joan Matthews was born in 1960 in Montreal, Quebec, Canada, with Abenaki (First Nations tribe), Spanish and Scottish ancestry. Peter and Joan Matthews already had a son, Gary born a year earlier and another son, Glenn followed a year after Matthews. She listened and sang along to Joni Mitchell, Linda Ronstadt and Barbra Streisand records. Her parents separated when she was 14, Peter became a Vancouver advertising executive and Joan took up yoga instructing near Quebec. At the age of 15 Matthews joined friends in the Little Benny Blues Band (named after Little Benny Park where they hung out). She left school at 16 and went busking across North America including south to Mexico with friends. By 1978, she was in Los Angeles where she busked, made jewellery and worked as a session singer. In February 1981, Matthews sang lead vocal for "Willow Pattern" on Osamu Kitajima's album Dragon King (1982). She met Japanese musician, Hiroshi Sato, and travelled to Japan to record lead vocals for his fourth album, Awakening, which was released in June on Alfa Records.

=== 1982–1990: soundtracks, Rockmelons and Absent Friends ===
Back in Los Angeles, Australian singer Glenn Shorrock (ex-Little River Band) asked her to provide backing vocals on his solo album Villain of the Peace (1982) and to join him on his subsequent six-week tour of Australia in 1983. Matthews decided to stay in Sydney at the tour's completion and found herself in demand as a session vocalist and singing jingles. She sang on albums by Jimmy Barnes, Richard Clapton, Tim Finn and Icehouse. After singing backing vocals on Models' 1985 album Out of Mind, Out of Sight, she became a regular vocalist for the band. Matthews and Models' guitarist and vocalist, Sean Kelly, had an 11-year personal relationship. Other backing singers for Models included Kate Ceberano and Zan Abeyratne, both members of I'm Talking – the two bands often toured together. In 1986, Matthews joined Peter Blakeley and The Resurrection, with Blakeley (ex-Rockmelons) on lead vocals, Chris Abrahams on bass guitar and piano (ex-The Benders), Jim Benjamin on drums and Mark Punch on guitar (Renée Geyer Band). Her second album with Models, Models' Media appeared in December which reached the top 30.

In 1985, Matthews recorded vocals for the soundtrack of Australian Broadcasting Corporation (ABC) TV series Dancing Daze (1986) with musical production by Martin Armiger. Her tracks were, "Dancing Daze" (duet with Jenny Morris), "Dare to Be Bold", "Might Have Been" (trio with Morris and Mark Williams) and "Lost in a Dancing Daze". First three of her tracks were released as singles but neither they nor the related album, Dancing Daze – Rock reached the top 50. ABC-TV and Armiger asked Matthews to sing with Ceberano on the soundtrack to the series Stringer in 1987. The soundtrack You've Always Got The Blues was released as a duet album by Ceberano and Matthews in April 1988 and reached No. 4 on the Australian Kent Music Report Albums Chart.

Matthews was a member of Noel's Cowards, a short term project, including ex-Split Enz members Noel Crombie on drums, Nigel Griggs on bass guitar and Phil Judd on guitar. Noel's Cowards, with Matthews on lead vocals, provided six tracks for the Australian movie Rikky and Pete (1988). She was featured vocalist on the single "Jump" released in October from Rockmelons' debut album Tales of the City. Tales of the City peaked at No. 14 on the ARIA Albums Chart. At the ARIA Music Awards of 1989, Rockmelons won 'Breakthrough Artist – Album' and Stringer won 'Best Original Soundtrack / Cast / Show Recording'.

Matthews joined the Australian supergroup, Absent Friends, in 1989 with Kelly and James Valentine of Models, Garry Gary Beers of INXS, Roger Mason and Mick King. She sang lead vocals on "I Don't Want to Be with Nobody but You" which reached No. 4 on the ARIA Singles Chart; the related album, Here's Looking Up Your Address peaked at No.7. The band toured Australia and then supported INXS on a European tour. During this period, Matthews continued her session work, singing on the Cher album Heart of Stone in 1989 and on Blakeley's solo album Harry's Café De Wheels in 1990. Absent Friends disbanded and Matthews pursued her solo career.

=== 1990–1999: solo success ===
In 1990, Matthews recorded her debut solo album Émigré with the assistance of Absent Friends members, Beers, Kelly, King, Mason, Valentine, Francois and Andrew Duffield as well as Tim Finn and Blakeley. It was produced by Ricky Fataar and released on the rooArt label owned by INXS manager, Chris Murphy; Émigré became a hit, being certified platinum. She won the Australian Rolling Stone magazine award for best female vocalist in 1990 for her debut album and her work with Absent Friends.

At the ARIA Music Awards of 1991, "I Don't Want to Be with Nobody but You" won the ARIA Award for Single of the Year for Absent Friends; while Matthews won two ARIA Awards, ARIA Award for Best Female Artist and ARIA Award for Breakthrough Artist – Single for "Token Angels", which hit No. 18. Subsequent hits from the album were "Woman's Gotta Have It" (No. 34) and "Let's Kiss (Like Angels Do)" (No. 14). Her touring band included Ron François on bass guitar (ex-Teardrop Explodes), Amanda Brown on oboe and violin (ex-The Go-Betweens), Robbie James on guitar (Ganggajang), King on guitar (Absent Friends), Lisa Maxwell on backing vocals, Mark Meyer on drums (Moving Pictures), Mark O'Connor on keyboards and Valentine on saxophone. On 31 May, she performed at Dallas Brooks Hall, Melbourne which was released as the live album The Way It Has to Be in October. She also supported the Neville Brothers on their Australian tour.

In February–March 1992 Matthews recorded her second solo studio album Lily in Los Angeles with T-Bone Burnett producing, it was released on 28 September while she was on tour supporting Simply Red. Her album peaked at No. 2 and achieved double-platinum in Australia selling over 140,000 copies. The lead single "The Day You Went Away" hit No. 2 while the album spawned two further hits in "Friday's Child" (No. 15) and "If Only I Could" (No. 41). At the ARIA Music Awards of 1992, Matthews was nominated for Best Female Artist. The Canadian CD release of Lily included a French-language version of "The Day You Went Away". Matthews toured internationally in 1993 including gigs in London, Montreal and New York. She won 'Best Female Artist' for Lily and both 'Best Single' and ARIA Award for Highest Selling Single for "The Day You Went Away" at the ARIA Music Awards of 1993. Matthews had a film role as a nightclub singer in Flynn (1993) which starred Guy Pearce as Australian-born actor Errol Flynn.

Matthews released her next album The Witness Tree on 14 November 1994, featuring the Top 40 hit "Standing Strong". The album went platinum selling 100,000 copies and she won her third ARIA award for Best Female Artist at the ARIA Music Awards of 1994 for "Friday's Child". In 1995, Matthews became an Australian citizen. Her single "Standing Strong" won 'Most Performed Australian Work' at the APRA Awards of 1995. She returned to Canada for a visit before the release of her next album Ghosts in 1997. The single "Beloved" from the album peaked at No. 49 on the Australian charts. In 1999, Matthews released Stepping Stones, a greatest hits package which hit No. 4, earning her another platinum certification. According to rock music historian, Ian McFarlane in his Encyclopedia of Australian Rock and Pop, Matthews provides "extraordinary, crystal-clear vocals [...] a soulfulness that was the mark of a truly gifted singer".

=== 2000–present: music, TV and other activities ===
In 2000, Matthews joined the cast of a new Australian musical theatre production of Godspell alongside Angry Anderson, Jimmy Barnes, Debra Byrne, Marie Wilson, Fiona Horne, Belinda Emmett, Paul Mercurio and Terence Trent D'Arby. In February, with rehearsals commencing, Matthews released her cover of "Day by Day" but financial difficulties prevented the musical from being staged. She contributed "Pure Inspiration" to Olympic Record – an album for the Sydney Olympics by various Australian artists.

In 2001, Matthews relocated from Sydney to a property near Coffs Harbour on the Mid North Coast of New South Wales. Her solo album, Beautiful View, was released on 17 July and made the Top 40. Produced by Michael Szumowski, it was her first with BMG records, and included three singles, "Free", "Beautiful View" and "Like the Sun" which did not reach the top 50. A limited edition of Beautiful View included a bonus six-track disc. The accompanying music videos were directed by Ryan Renshaw.

In 2003, Matthews sang a duet with Rod Stewart on the track "My Heart Stood Still" on the Australian release of his album As Time Goes By: The Great American Songbook, Volume II. She released her own covers album, Café Naturale in May 2004. Matthews explained why she recorded it acoustically, "To keep creative you have to break down your own personal barriers. With this record that meant moving away from pop and crafting something instrument-driven, something that feels like me playing live". The album includes acoustic versions of U2's "One" from their Achtung Baby album and Massive Attack's "Protection" from the album of the same name. The first single "All I Need" is a version of the Air song from the Moon Safari album. Matthews' album debuted in the top 50 of the ARIA charts.

Matthews embarked on the national Fallen Angels Tour during May–June 2008 and then co-headlined with Ian Moss in October–November. On 8 November, Matthews released the album She on her own independent record label, Barking Bear. The album is a personal collection of favourite songs by women who have inspired her, Bonnie Raitt, Aretha Franklin, Emmylou Harris, Chrissie Hynde, Joni Mitchell, Buffy Sainte-Marie, Lucinda Williams and Jane Siberry. In June 2010, she combined with country musician, Adam Harvey for the Both Sides Tour. In October 2010, Matthews performed at the Opening Ceremony of the Alice Springs Masters Games. On 27 October, her former band, Models were inducted into the ARIA Hall of Fame by Matthews. The line-up of Duffield, Ferrie, Kelly, Mason, Price and Valentine performed "I Hear Motion" and "Evolution". Matthews recalled meeting the group for the first time at a recording session – she was due to provide backing vocals but they were busy playing indoor cricket in the studio.

Matthews independently released Billie and Me: The White Room Sessions on 27 July 2015. The live album, available through her official website only, was recorded in the winter of 2012 with Brendan St Ledger on piano and Greg Royal on standup bass. The album celebrates the centenary year birth of Billie Holiday, who Matthews describes Holiday as an "iconic woman whose soul and music has been long admired."

In November 2016, Matthews featured on the Catherine Britt single, "F U Cancer" alongside Kasey Chambers, Beccy Cole, Lyn Bowtell, Josh Pyke and Wes Carr.

== TV appearances ==
Matthews has appeared on three series of Channel Seven's celebrity singing competition It Takes Two. The first series premiered on 28 May 2006, she was partnered by former Australian Rules footballer, Richard Champion, they were voted off in week six. On 1 May 2007, ahead of the second series, Matthews, David Hobson and Troy Cassar-Daley sang "Got to Get You into My Life" on celebrity dancing competition Dancing with the Stars grand final, which was won by Ceberano and her professional dance partner John Paul Collins. It Takes Two second series premiered on 8 May, where Matthews was paired with comedian Russell Gilbert, they were voted off in week four of the competition. The third series commenced on 12 February 2008 with John Mangos, news reader for Sky News Australia, and Matthews being voted off in week two. Matthews appeared on the TV show RocKwiz on 1 November 2008, she performed Toto's "Hold the Line" as a duet with Johnny Galvatron from The Galvatrons.

== Discography ==
- You've Always Got The Blues (duet album with Kate Ceberano) (1988)
- Émigré (1990)
- The Way It Has to Be (1991)
- Lily (1992)
- The Witness Tree (1994)
- Ghosts (1997)
- Beautiful View (2001)
- Café Naturale (2004)
- She (2008)
- The Welcome Fire (2013)
- Billie and Me: The White Room Sessions (2015)

== Awards and nominations ==
=== APRA Awards ===
The APRA Awards are presented annually from 1982 by the Australasian Performing Right Association (APRA).

Year	Nominee / work	Award	Result
1995	"Standing Strong" – (Wendy Matthews, Glenn Skinner)	Most Performed Australian Work	Won

=== ARIA Awards ===
The ARIA Music Awards are presented annually from 1987 by the Australian Recording Industry Association (ARIA). Matthews has won six awards from twenty-two nominations as a solo artist.

Year	Nominee / work	Award	Result
1987	"Dancing Daze"	Best Female Artist	Nominated
1989	You've Always Got The Blues (with Kate Ceberano)	Best Female Artist	Nominated
1989	You've Always Got The Blues (with Kate Ceberano)	Best Adult Contemporary Album	Nominated
1989	You've Always Got The Blues (with Kate Ceberano)	Best Jazz Album	Nominated
1991	Émigré	Best Female Artist	Won
1991	Émigré	Breakthrough Artist – Album	Nominated
1991	"(I Don't Want to Be With) Nobody but You – (Absent Friends featuring Wendy Matthews)	Single of the Year	Won
1991	"(I Don't Want to Be With) Nobody but You – (Absent Friends featuring Wendy Matthews)	Breakthrough Artist – Single	Nominated
1991	"Token Angels"	Breakthrough Artist – Single	Won
1992	"Let's Kiss (Like Angels Do)"	Best Female Artist	Nominated
1993	Lily	Album of the Year	Nominated
1993	Lily	Highest Selling Album	Nominated
1993	Lily	Best Female Artist	Won
1993	"The Day You Went Away"	Single of the Year	Won
1993	"The Day You Went Away"	Highest Selling Single	Won
1994	"Friday's Child"	Best Female Artist	Won
1994	Lily	Highest Selling Album	Nominated
1995	The Witness Tree	Best Adult Contemporary Album	Nominated
1995	The Witness Tree	Highest Selling Album	Nominated
1997	"Then I Walked Away"	Best Female Artist	Nominated
1998	Ghosts	Best Adult Contemporary Album	Nominated
1998	Ghosts except "Halcyon Days" – Tony Espie	Engineer of the Year	Nominated
2001	Beautiful View	Best Adult Contemporary Album	Nominated

Matthews has also won awards as a member of Rockmelons and projects (Stringers soundtrack album, You've Always Got the Blues – Songs from the ABC TV Series "Stringer").

Year	Nominee / work	Award	Result
1989	Tales of the City	Breakthrough Artist – Album	Won
1989	Stringer various Australia (Kate Ceberano, Matthews, Martin Armiger, Joy Smithers)	Best Original Soundtrack/Cast/Show Album	Won

=== Country Music Awards of Australia ===
The Country Music Awards of Australia (CMAA) (also known as the Golden Guitar Awards) is an annual awards night held in January during the Tamworth Country Music Festival, in Tamworth, New South Wales, celebrating recording excellence in the Australian country music industry. Matthews has won one awards from one nominations.

Year	Nominee / work	Award	Result
2017	"F U Cancer" (Catherine Britt with Kasey Chambers, Beccy Cole, Lyn Bowtell, Josh Pyke and Wes Carr)	Vocal Collaboration of the Year	Won

=== Mo Awards ===
The Australian Entertainment Mo Awards (commonly known informally as the Mo Awards), were annual Australian entertainment industry awards. They recognise achievements in live entertainment in Australia from 1975 to 2016. Wendy Matthews won one award in that time.

Year	Nominee / work	Award	Result (wins only)
1990	Wendy Matthews	Female Rock Performer of the Year	Won

=== Rolling Stone Awards ===
The Rolling Stone Awards.

Year	Nominee / work	Award	Result (wins only)
1990	Wendy Matthews	Best Female Vocalist	Won
