= Truth (Southern Sons album) =

1993 compilation album by Southern Sons

Compilation album by Southern Sons
- Released: Europe November 1993
- Recorded: 1990–1992
- Genre: Pop rock, soft rock
- Length: 48:59
- Label: RCA Records
- Producer: Ross Fraser, Louie Shelton

Southern Sons chronology
Nothing But The Truth (1992)	Truth (1993)	Zone (1996)

Truth is a compilation album by Australian music group Southern Sons. The album was released only in Europe and Canada by RCA Records in November 1993 on CD and audio cassette. The album contains an assortment of tracks taken from their first two studio albums, Southern Sons and Nothing But The Truth, it was produced by Ross Fraser and Louis Shelton

== Track listing ==
1. "Always and Ever" (P. Buckle) – 3:58
2. "Lead Me to Water" (P. Buckle) – 4:32
3. "Sometimes" (P. Bowman, P. Buckle) – 3:54
4. "Heart in Danger" (P. Buckle) – 4:58
5. "You Were There" (P. Buckle) – 3:58
6. "Shelter" (J. Jones, P. Buckle) – 5:18
7. "Still Love You So" (P. Buckle) – 4:45
8. "Hold Me in Your Arms" (P. Buckle) – 4:05
9. "Can't Wait Any Longer" (J. Jones, P. Buckle) – 4:24
10. "Nothing But The Truth" (P. Buckle) – 5:11
11. "What I See" (P. Bowman, P. Buckle) – 3:33

== Personnel ==
- Jack Jones – lead vocals, guitars
- Phil Buckle – guitars, backing vocals
- Virgil Donati – drums, keyboards
- Geoff Cain – bass
- Peter Bowman – guitars, backing vocals
- David Hirschfelder – string arrangements and keyboards on "Always And Ever" and "You Were There"
- Geoff Hales – additional percussion
