= The Fabulous Caprettos =

Australian band

The Fabulous Caprettos is an Australian supergroup consisting of Joe Camilleri, Dave Gleeson, Jack Jones, and Rai Thistlethwayte. The band formed in 2020, when they began rehearsing and recording. Gleeson replaced original member Daryl Braithwaite in mid-2023; Camilleri replaced original member Russell Morris in 2025.

The band toured in 2021 and again in 2023. Further tours were held in 2024 and 2025.

== Members ==
All members of the band remain on stage for the entire show, providing harmonies and backing vocals for each other's songs.

- Joe Camilleri, is the lead singer of Jo Jo Zep & The Falcons and The Black Sorrows.
- Dave Gleeson is the lead singer of The Screaming Jets and fronted The Angels from 2011 to 2023 following the death of lead singer Doc Neeson.
- Jack Jones was the lead singer of Southern Sons. He has recorded or toured with many singers, including John Farnham and Rick Price.
- Rai Thistlethwayte was the lead singer and primary songwriter of Thirsty Merc. He is a solo performer, session musician and teacher.

== Origin of the name ==
The original band members jokingly referred to themselves as the "greatest of all time" (goat). Not wanting to appear egotistical, they chose the Italian word for goat: capretto. Hence, The Fabulous Caprettos.

== Typical setlist ==
This is a setlist from the Braithwaite-Morris era of the band.

1. "Sweet, Sweet Love" (Morris)
2. "Howzat" (Braithwaite)
3. "Always and Ever" (Jones)
4. "20 Good Reasons" (Thitlethwayte)
5. "Hit the Ground Running" (Caprettos original)
6. "It's All Over Now, Baby Blue" (Morris)
7. "Love Songs" (Braithwaite)
8. "Hold Me in Your Arms" (Jones)
9. "Mousetrap Heart" (Thistlethwayte)
10. "Highway to the Heart" (Caprettos original)
11. "Understanding Love" (Thistlethwayte)
12. "Hush" (Morris)
13. "Lead Me to Water" (Jones)
14. "One Summer" (Braithwaite)
15. "In the Summertime" (Thistlethwayte)
16. "Heart in Danger" (Jones)
17. "The Real Thing" (Morris)
18. "The Horses" (Braithwaite, all)

== Band ==
- Joe Camilleri, vocals, saxophone
- Dave Gleeson: vocals
- Jack Jones, vocals, guitar
- Rai Thistlethwayte: vocals, keyboard, guitar

=== Former members ===
- Darryl Braithwaite, vocals
- Russell Morris, vocals, guitar

=== Backing musicians ===
- Jackie Barnes: drums
- Jason Vorherr: bass
