= Regine Velasquez discography =

Filipino artist discography

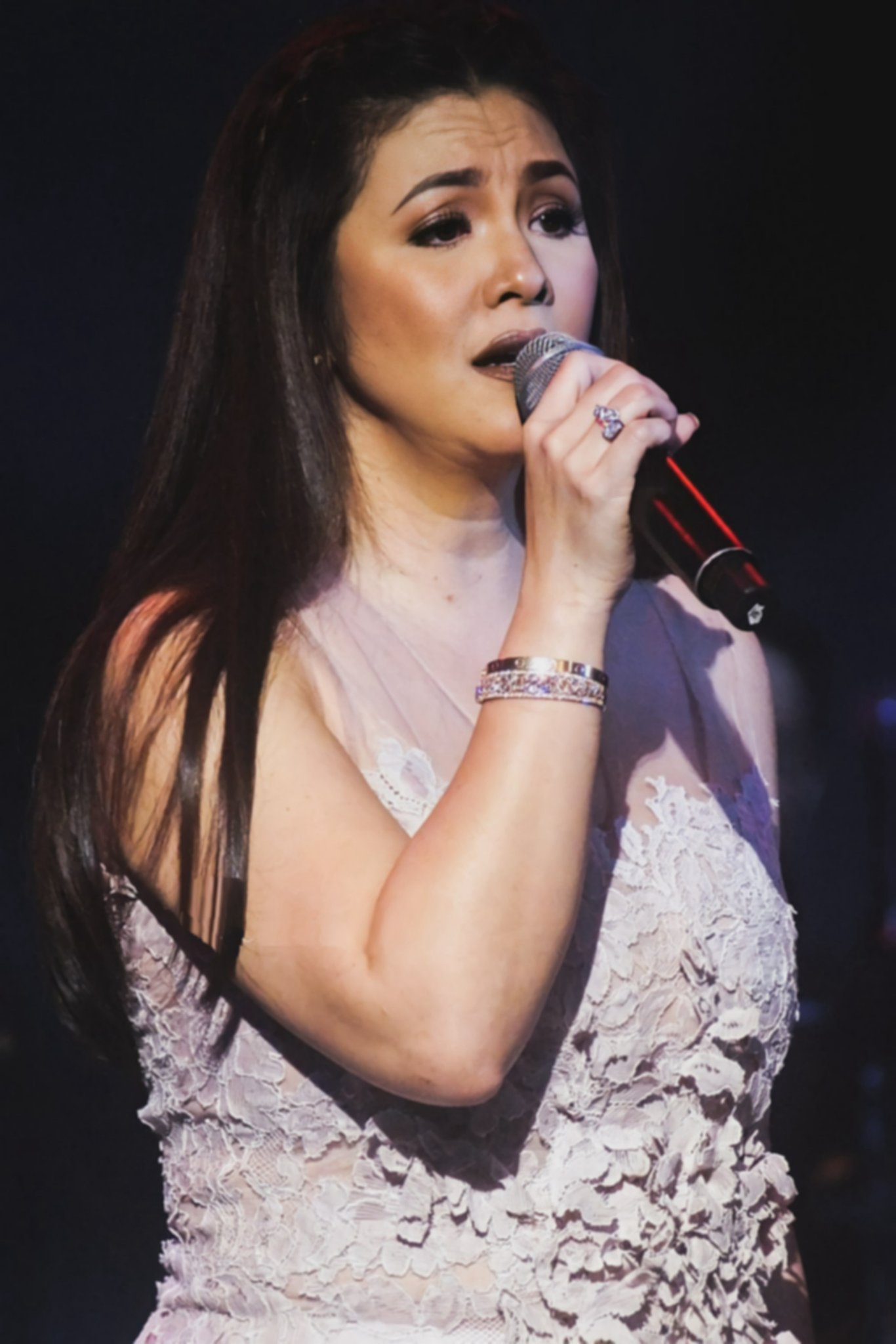
- Velasquez performing at ASAP Natin 'To in 2019
- Studio albums: 18
- Extended plays: 5
- Soundtrack albums: 8
- Live albums: 1
- Compilation albums: 15
- Singles: 93
- Promotional singles: 23
- Box sets: 1

Filipino singer Regine Velasquez has released eighteen studio albums, eight soundtrack albums, one live album, fifteen compilation albums, five extended plays (EPs), ninety-three singles (including nine as featured artist), and twenty-three promotional singles. In 1984, she won the television talent competition Ang Bagong Kampeon and was signed to a record deal with OctoArts International. She released her first single, "Love Me Again", in 1986, under the name Chona. After adopting the stage name Regine Velasquez, she signed with Viva Records in 1987 and released her debut studio album, Regine, that spawned three singles—"Kung Maibabalik Ko Lang", "Urong Sulong", and "Isang Lahi". In December 1989, she represented the Philippines at the Asia-Pacific Singing Contest, performing the songs "You'll Never Walk Alone" and "And I Am Telling You I'm Not Going", and won the competition. Her subsequent studio albums Nineteen 90 (1989) and Tagala Talaga (1991) featured the singles "Narito Ako" and "Buhay ng Buhay Ko", respectively. A cover version of "It's Hard to Say Goodbye" with Paul Anka became the lead single for her fourth studio album, Reason Enough, which was released in July 1993.

After Velasquez signed with PolyGram in 1994, she released her fifth studio album, Listen Without Prejudice, in countries including China, Hong Kong, Indonesia, Malaysia, Singapore, Taiwan, and Thailand. It featured the lead single "In Love With You", a duet with Jacky Cheung. The album has sold 700,000 copies in Asia, making it the best-selling album of her career to date. Two more studio albums were released in the region, My Love Emotion (1995) and Retro (1997). In 1998, Velasquez parted with PolyGram and signed with Los Angeles-based producer Mark J. Feist's MJF Company. Her ninth studio album, Drawn, was released in November 1998 and includes the singles "How Could You Leave" and "Ikaw". The next year, she released her tenth studio album, R2K (1999), which was subsequently certified twelve-times platinum by the Philippine Association of the Record Industry (PARI) and became the best-selling album by a female artist in the Philippines.

Velasquez released the soundtrack album Kailangan Ko'y Ikaw in July 2000. Its lead single served as the love theme of the motion picture of the same name. The album sold more than 240,000 copies and was certified six-times platinum. In October 2000, she released her first live album, Regine Live: Songbird Sings the Classics, a fifteen-piece setlist performed at the Westin Philippine Plaza in Manila. The singer's subsequent records—Covers Volume 1 (2004), Covers Volume 2 (2006), Low Key (2008) and Fantasy (2010)—were all cover albums. Velasquez took a three-year break to record new material and introduced a gospel-inspired album Hulog Ka ng Langit (2013), which includes the singles "Nathaniel (Gift of God)" and "Hele ni Inay". Her seventeenth studio album, R3.0, was released in October 2017. Its singles, "Tadhana" and "Hugot", were released a month earlier.

Having sold more than seven million records in the Philippines and a further million and a half in other parts of Asia, Velasquez is the best-selling Filipino artist of all time. According to PARI, she is also the only Filipino artist to have eight of her albums exceed sales of 200,000 units each.

== Albums ==
=== Studio albums ===
List of studio albums, with sales figures and certifications
Title	Album details	Sales	Certifications
Regine	Released: 1987; Label: Viva; Formats: LP, cassette, CD	PHI: 20,000 (Note: Philippine sales figure equivalent of gold certification for Regine.)	PARI: Gold (Note: Philippine music certification equivalent for sales of Regine.)
Nineteen 90	Released: November 11, 1989; Label: Vicor; Formats: LP, cassette, CD	PHI: 80,000 (Note: Philippine sales figure equivalent of gold certification for Nineteen 90.)	PARI: 2× Platinum (Note: Philippine music certification equivalent for sales of Nineteen 90.)
Tagala Talaga	Released: October 2, 1991; Label: Vicor; Formats: LP, cassette, CD		
Reason Enough	Released: July 1993; Label: PolyCosmic; Formats: LP, cassette, CD	PHI: 120,000 (Note: Philippine sales figure equivalent of 3× platinum certification for Reason Enough.)	PARI: 3× Platinum
Listen Without Prejudice	Released: 1994; Label: Mercury, Polygram, PolyCosmic; Formats: LP, cassette, CD	WW: 700,000 (Note: Worldwide sales figure for Listen Without Prejudice.); PHI: 100,000 (Note: Philippine sales figure for Listen Without Prejudice.); CHN: 300,000 (Note: China sales figure for Listen Without Prejudice.); THA: 20,000 (Note: Thailand sales figure for Listen Without Prejudice.)	PARI: 2× Platinum (Note: Philippine music certification equivalent for sales of Listen Without Prejudice.); ASIRI: Gold; IFPI TWN: 2× Platinum; IFPI HKG: Gold: RIAS: Gold; RIM: Gold
My Love Emotion	Released: 1995; Label: Mercury, Polygram, PolyCosmic; Formats: LP, cassette, CD	WW: 250,000 (Note: Worldwide sales figure for My Love Emotion.); PHI: 125,000 (Note: Philippine sales figure for My Love Emotion.); CHN: 125,000 (Note: China sales figure for My Love Emotion.)	PARI: 3× Platinum (Note: Philippine music certification equivalent for sales of My Love Emotion.)
Love Was Born on Christmas Day	Released: 1996; Label: PolyCosmic; Formats: LP, cassette, CD		
Retro	Released: 1997; Label: Mercury, Polygram, PolyCosmic; Formats: LP, cassette, CD	PHI: 120,000 (Note: Philippine sales figure equivalent of 3× platinum certification for Retro.)	PARI: 3× Platinum.
Drawn	Released: November 22, 1998; Label: MJF Company, Viva; Formats: LP, cassette, CD	PHI: 240,000 (Note: Philippine sales figure equivalent of 6× platinum certification for Drawn.)	PARI: 6× Platinum
R2K	Released: November 24, 1999; Label: Viva; Formats: LP, cassette, CD	PHI: 480,000 (Note: Philippine sales figure equivalent of 12× platinum certification for R2K.)	PARI: 12× Platinum
Reigne	Released: November 29, 2001; Label: Viva; Formats: LP, cassette, CD	PHI: 120,000 (Note: Philippine sales figure equivalent of 3× platinum certification for Reigne.)	PARI: 3× Platinum
Covers Volume 1	Released: October 19, 2004; Label: Viva; Formats: CD, digital download	PHI: 200,000 (Note: Philippine sales figure equivalent of 6× platinum certification for Covers Volume 1.)	PARI: 6× Platinum
Covers Volume 2	Released: January 30, 2006; Label: Viva; Formats: CD, digital download	PHI: 80,000 (Note: Philippine sales figure equivalent of 2× platinum certification for Covers Volume 2.)	PARI: 2× Platinum
Low Key	Released: December 16, 2008; Label: Universal; Formats: CD, digital download	PHI: 25,000	PARI: Platinum
Fantasy	Released: December 2010; Label: Universal; Formats: CD, digital download	PHI: 20,000 (Note: Philippine sales figure equivalent of platinum certification for Fantasy.)	PARI: Platinum
Hulog Ka ng Langit	Released: November 2013; Label: Universal; Formats: CD, digital download	PHI: 15,000 (Note: Philippine sales figure equivalent of platinum certification for Hulog Ka ng Langit.)	PARI: Platinum
R3.0	Released: October 21, 2017; Label: Viva; Formats: CD, digital download	PHI: 15,000 (Note: Philippine sales figure equivalent of platinum certification for R3.0.)	PARI: Platinum
Reginified	Released: November 22, 2024; Label: Star Music; Formats: CD, LP, digital download, cassette, streaming		

=== Live albums ===
List of live albums, with sales figures and certifications
Title	Album details	Sales	Certifications
Regine Live: Songbird Sings the Classics	Released: December 2, 2000 (Note: Live recording of the concert at the Westin Philippine Plaza on October 6, 2000.); Label: Viva; Formats: LP, cassette, CD	PHI: 240,000 (Note: Philippine sales figure equivalent of 6× platinum certification for Regine Live: Songbird Sings the Classics.)	PARI: 6× Platinum

=== Soundtrack albums ===
List of soundtrack albums, with sales figures and certifications
Title	Album details	Sales	Certifications
Wanted Perfect Mother	Released: May 16, 1996; Label: Viva; Formats: Cassette, CD		
Kailangan Ko'y Ikaw	Released: July 28, 2000; Label: Viva; Formats: Cassette, CD	PHI: 240,000 (Note: Philippine sales figure equivalent of 6× platinum certification for Kailangan Ko'y Ikaw.)	PARI: 6× Platinum
Pangako Ikaw Lang	Released: 2001; Label: Viva; Formats: Cassette, CD		
Pangarap Ko ang Ibigin Ka	Released: April 15, 2003; Label: Viva; Formats: Cassette, CD		
Captain Barbell	Released: December 19, 2003; Label: Viva; Formats: CD, digital download		
Till I Met You	Released: 2006; Label: Universal; Formats: CD, digital download		
Paano Kita Iibigin	Released: May 1, 2007; Label: Star; Formats: CD, digital download	PHI: 60,000 (Note: Philippine sales figure equivalent of 2× platinum certification for Paano Kita Iibigin.)	PARI: 2× Platinum
Urduja	Released: 2008; Label: Universal; Formats: CD, digital download		

=== Compilation albums ===
List of compilation albums
Title	Album details
Collectors Edition	Released: 1994; Label: Vicor; Formats: Cassette, CD
Very Special	Released: 1998; Label: PolyGram; Formats: Cassette, CD
Unsolo	Released: 2000; Label: MCA Universal; Formats: Cassette, CD
Greatest Hits: An Audio Visual Anthology	Released: 2002; Label: Viva; Formats: Cassette, CD
The Platinum Album	Released: 2004; Label: Vicor; Formats: CD, digital download
The Songbird & The Songwriter	Released: 2004; Label: Viva; Formats: Cassette, CD, digital download
Duets	Released: 2005; Label: EMI; Formats: Cassette, CD
Silver Series: Greatest Hits	Released: August 29, 2006; Label: Viva; Formats: CD, digital download
Silver Series: Movie Theme Songs	Released: August 29, 2006; Label: Viva; Formats: CD, digital download
Silver Series: Duets	Released: August 29, 2006; Label: Viva; Formats: CD, digital download
18 Greatest Hits	Released: January 1, 2009; Label: Viva; Formats: CD, digital download
Two of a Kind	Released: 2010; Label: PolyEast; Formats: Cassette, CD
Ogie & Regine: Ever After	Released: 2010; Label: PolyEast; Formats: CD, digital download
OPM Side By Side Hits of Regine Velasquez & Ogie Alcasid	Released: March 12, 2012; Label: Viva; Formats: CD, digital download
Total Recall	Released: May 29, 2012; Label: PolyEast; Formats: CD, LP, digital download

== Extended plays ==
List of extended plays
Title	Album details
Regine: Special Limited Edition	Released: 1991; Label: Vicor; Formats: LP, cassette, CD
In Love with You	Released: 1994; Label: PolyCosmic, Polygram; Formats: Cassette, CD
My Love Emotion	Released: 1995; Label: PolyCosmic, Polygram; Formats: Cassette, CD
Fly	Released: 1996; Label: Polycosmic, Polygram; Formats: Cassette, CD
Shine	Released: February 22, 2005; Label: Viva; Formats: Cassette, CD

== Box sets ==
List of box sets with notes
Title	Details	Notes
54 Greatest Hits	Released: 2010; Label: Viva; Format: CD	3-CD box set of previous recordings; Features "I Don't Want to Miss a Thing", "The First Time Ever I Saw Your Face", "Can't Take My Eyes Off You", "Music and Me" and "The Long and Winding Road"

== Singles ==
=== As lead artist ===
List of singles as lead artist, showing year released and originating album
Title	Year	Album
"Love Me Again"	1986	Non-album single
"Kung Maibabalik Ko Lang"	1987	Regine
"Urong Sulong"	1987	Regine
"Isang Lahi"	1987	Regine
"And I Am Telling You I'm Not Going"	1989	Regine: Special Limited Edition
"You'll Never Walk Alone"	1989	Regine: Special Limited Edition
"Please Be Careful with My Heart" (with Jose Mari Chan)	1989	Constant Change
"Narito Ako"	1989	Nineteen 90
"Buhay ng Buhay Ko"	1991	Tagala Talaga
"Anak"	1992	Tagala Talaga
"Sa Ugoy ng Duyan"	1992	Tagala Talaga
"Kastilyong Buhangin"	1992	Tagala Talaga
"Magkasuyo Buong Gabi" (Note: "Magkasuyo Buong Gabi" was originally released on various artists' compilation album Unang Sikat in 1992; it was included in Velasquez's compilation album Unsolo in 2000.) (with Janno Gibbs)	1992	Unsolo
"It's Hard to Say Goodbye" (with Paul Anka)	1993	Reason Enough
"Sana Maulit Muli"	1993	Reason Enough
"Reason Enough"	1993	Reason Enough
"Muli" (with Gary Valenciano)	1993	Hataw Na
"In Love with You" (with Jacky Cheung)	1994	Listen Without Prejudice
"Follow the Sun"	1994	Listen Without Prejudice
"I Would Die for You"	1994	Listen Without Prejudice
"Forever" (with Martin Nievera)	1994	Roads
"My Love Emotion"	1995	My Love Emotion
"You've Made Me Stronger"	1995	My Love Emotion
"You Are My Song"	1996	Wanted Perfect Mother
"I Can" (with Donna Cruz and Mikee Cojuangco)	1996	Do Re Mi
"Fly"	1996	Retro
"I Just Don't Want to Be Lonely"	1996	Retro
"Bluer Than Blue"	1996	Retro
"You Were There"	1996	Retro
"Zoom"	1996	Retro
"I Can't Help It" (with Remus Choy)	1996	Retro
"Love Was Born on Christmas Day"	1996	Love Was Born on Christmas Day
"Maybe Next Year"	1996	Love Was Born on Christmas Day
"Believe It"	1997	Songs from Adarna: The Mythical Bird
"How Could You Leave"	1998	Drawn
"Emotion"	1998	Drawn
"Ikaw"	1998	Drawn
"More Than Words Can Say" (Note: Velasquez and Hasselhoff recorded "More Than Words Can Say" for his film Legacy in 1998; it was included in Velasquez's compilation album Unsolo in 2000.) (with David Hasselhoff)	1998	Unsolo
"On the Wings of Love"	1999	R2K
"One Love"	1999	R2K
"Fallin'"	1999	R2K
"Lost Without Your Love"	1999	R2K
"For the Love of You"	1999	R2K
"In Your Eyes"	1999	R2K
"I Don't Wanna Miss a Thing"	2000	R2K
"Kailangan Ko'y Ikaw"	2000	Kailangan Ko'y Ikaw
"Tuwing Umuulan (At Kapiling Ka)"	2000	Kailangan Ko'y Ikaw
"With You I'm Born Again (with Gerard Salonga)	2000	Regine Live: Songbird Sings the Classics
"Habang May Buhay" (with Jaya)	2000	Five
"Pangako"	2001	Pangako Ikaw Lang
"With a Smile"	2001	Pangako Ikaw Lang
"To Reach You"	2001	Reigne
"Dadalhin"	2002	Reigne
"Sa Aking Pag-iisa"	2002	Reigne
"Hanggang Ngayon" (with Ogie Alcasid)	2002	A Better Man
"Pangarap Ko ang Ibigin Ka"	2003	Pangarap Ko ang Ibigin Ka
"Hinahanap Hanap Kita"	2003	Pangarap Ko ang Ibigin Ka
"Sa Piling Mo"	2003	Captain Barbell
"Forevermore"	2004	Covers Volume 1
"Minsan Lang Kitang Iibigin"	2004	Covers Volume 1
"Say That You Love Me"	2004	Covers Volume 1
"Pangarap Ko'y Ikaw"	2004	Covers Volume 1
"Shine"	2005	Shine
"Hold Me in Your Arms"	2006	Covers Volume 2
"Till I Met You"	2006	Till I Met You
"Alipin"	2006	Till I Met You
"Don't Go"	2006	Till I Met You
"Bakit Ba Iniibig Ka" (with Erik Santos)	2006	Loving You Now
"Paano Kita Iibigin" (with Piolo Pascual)	2007	Paano Kita Iibigin
"Tell Me That You Love Me"	2008	Low Key
"And I Love You So"	2008	Low Key
"Been Waiting"	2010	Fantasy
"Hulog Ka ng Langit"	2013	Hulog Ka ng Langit
"Sa'yo Na Lang Ako"	2013	Hulog Ka ng Langit
"Hele ni Inay"	2013	Hulog Ka ng Langit
"Tadhana"	2017	R3.0
"Hugot"	2017	R3.0
"Nothing Can Stop Us Now" (with Rick Price)	2019	Non-album single
"Unbreakable" (with Moira Dela Torre)	2019	Non-album single
"Istorya"	2020	Non-album single
"ILY" (with Ogie Alcasid and DJ M.O.D.)	2022	Non-album single
"Bitaw" (with Poppert Bernadas)	2023	Non-album single
"Nag-iisa Lang"	2023	Non-album single
"It Must Have Been Love"	2023	Reginified
"The Only Exception"	2024	Reginified

=== As featured artist ===
List of singles as featured artist, showing year released and originating album
Title	Year	Album
"Each Passing Night" (Gary Valenciano featuring Regine Velasquez)	1990	Faces of Love
"Lipad ng Pangarap" (Angeline Quinto featuring Regine Velasquez)	2012	Fall In Love Again
"Takipsilim" (Gloc-9 featuring Regine Velasquez)	2013	Liham at Lihim
"Push Mo Yan Te!" (Vice Ganda featuring Regine Velasquez)	2014	#Trending
"Somewhere Over the Rainbow" (Jed Madela featuring Regine Velasquez)	2015	Iconic
"Makita Kang Muli" (Ebe Dancel featuring Regine Velasquez)	2016	Bawat Daan
"Matibay" (Jonalyn Viray featuring Regine Velasquez)	2017	Jona
"Pagbigyang Muli" (Erik Santos featuring Regine Velasquez)	2018	Erik Santos 15
"Ipinagpanata Kita" (Davey Langit featuring Regine Velasquez)	2021	Non-album single
"Moonlight Kisses"(Jeremy Glinoga featuring Regine Velasquez)	2024	Late Night Madness

=== Promotional singles ===
List of promotional singles, showing year released and originating album
Title	Year	Album
"Written in the Sand" (Note: Velasquez recorded "Written in the Sand" in 1999. The single premiered during the international broadcast of the BBC television special 2000 Today.)	1999	Non-album promotional single
"Pangarap na Bituin" (Note: "Pangarap Na Bituin" was released as the main theme of the reality talent competition Star For a Night.)	2002	Star For a Night
"Search for a Star" (Note: "Search for a Star" was released as the main theme of the reality talent competition Search for a Star.)	2003	Search for a Star
"Di Na Nag-iisa" (Note: "Di Na Mag-iisa" was released as the main theme song for the television series Darna.)	2005	Non-album promotional single
"My Miracle" (Note: "My Miracle" was released as the main theme of the reality talent competition Pinoy Pop Superstar.)	2005	Pinoy Pop Superstar
"Maghihintay Ako" (Note: "Maghihintay Ako" was released as the main theme song for the television series Atlantika.)	2006	Non-album promotional single
"Maybe It's You" (Note: "Maybe It's You" was released as the main theme song for the television series Ako si Kim Samsoon.)	2008	Non-album promotional single
"When You Believe" (with Lani Misalucha)	2008	Kris Aquino: The Greatest Love
"Ako'y Sa'yo" (Note: "Ako'y Sayo" was released as the main theme song for the television series Totoy Bato.)	2009	Non-album promotional single
"Kaya Natin Ito!" (as part of OPM Artists United)	2009	Non-album charity single
"True Romance" (Note: "True Romance" was released as the main theme song for the television series I Heart You, Pare!.)	2010	Fantasy
"Walang Iba" (Note: "Walang Iba" was released as the main theme song for the television series Diva.)	2010	Fantasy
"S.M.I.L.E." (Operation Smile theme)	2010	Fantasy
"Biyahe Tayo!"	2011	Non-album promotional single
"Nandiyan Palagi" (Note: "Nandiyan Palagi" was released as the main theme song for the television series Genesis.)	2013	Non-album promotional single
"Tunay Na Kayamanan" (Note: "Tunay Na Kayamanan" was released as the main theme song for the television series Poor Señorita.)	2016	Non-album promotional single
"Ikaw Nga" (Note: "Ikaw Nga" was released as the main theme song for the television series Mulawin vs. Ravena.)	2017	Non-album promotional single
"I Am Beautiful"	2019	Non-album promotional single
"Ikaw Ang Aking Mahal" (Note: "Ikaw Ang Aking Mahal" was released as the main theme song for the television series The General's Daughter.)	2019	Non-album promotional single
"Mahal Ko O Mahal Ako" (Note: "Mahal Ko O Mahal Ako" was released as the main theme song for the television series Love Thy Woman.)	2020	Non-album promotional single
"Kailangan Kita" (Note: "Kailangan Kita" was released as the main theme song for the television series La Vida Lena.)	2021	Non-album promotional single
"Di Ka Nag-Iisa" (Note: "Di Ka Nag-Iisa" was released as the main theme song for the television series Ang Probinsyano.)	2021	Non-album promotional single
"Lipad Ng Pangarap" (Note: "Lipad Ng Pangarap" was released as the main theme song for the television series Pira-Pirasong Paraiso.)	2023	Non-album promotional single

== See also ==
- List of songs recorded by Regine Velasquez
