= Train Tracks (EP) =

EP by Southern Sons
- Released: June 1991
- Recorded: 1990–1991
- Genre: Pop, rock
- Length: 23:25
- Label: Wheatley Records, RCA Records
- Producer: Ross Fraser

Southern Sons chronology
Southern Sons (1990)	Train Tracks (1991)	Nothing But The Truth (1992)

Train Tracks is an EP by Australian band Southern Sons. The EP was released in Australia in June 1991 and reached number 40 on the ARIA charts. It is a limited edition pressing, released shortly after the release of their debut self-titled album.

== Track listing ==
1. "Waiting for That Train" (P. Bowman, P. Buckle) - 3:43
2. "More Than Enough" (Live) (P. Bowman, P. Buckle) - 4:02
3. "Do You Want My Love" (Live) (P. Buckle) - 3:51
4. "Make a Move" (Live) (P. Buckle) - 7:27
5. "Hold Me in Your Arms" (Live) (P. Buckle) - 4:25

== Personnel ==
- Jack Jones – lead vocals, guitar
- Phil Buckle – guitar, backing vocals
- Virgil Donati – drums, keyboards
- Geoff Cain – bass
- Peter Bowman – guitar, backing vocals

== Chart positions ==
Chart (1991)	Peak position
Australian Albums (ARIA)	40
