= 1991 ARIA Music Awards =

Annual Australian music awards

- Date: 25 March 1991
- Venue: Darling Harbour Convention Centre, Sydney, New South Wales

Highlights
- Most wins: Midnight Oil (6)
- Most nominations: Midnight Oil (8)
- Website: ariaawards.com.au

The Fifth Australian Recording Industry Association Music Awards (generally known as the ARIA Music Awards or simply the ARIAs) was held on 25 March 1991 at the Darling Harbour Convention Centre in Sydney. International host Bob Geldof was assisted by presenters to distribute 24 awards. There were live performances but the awards were not televised and the ceremony was noted for its three-hours plus length with Gary Morris, manager of Midnight Oil providing a 20-minute acceptance speech.

In addition to previous categories, "Lifetime Achievement Award" was created and first awarded posthumously to record producer and Albert Productions label owner, Ted Albert (who died in November 1990); an "Outstanding Achievement Award" was presented to Midnight Oil. The ARIA Hall of Fame inducted four artists: Don Burrows, Peter Dawson, Glenn Shorrock and Billy Thorpe.

== Ceremony details ==
Host Bob Geldof found the three-hour plus ceremony to be interminable and threatened to walk out. Midnight Oil's manager Gary Morris provided the longest acceptance speech of the night at 20 minutes. According to music journalist, Anthony O'Grady, "[he] covered a gambit [sic] of topics including the downfall of Western Civilization." Morris later stated that as the ceremony was not televised he decided to speak his mind. Billy Thorpe's speech on his Hall of Fame induction, "travelled almost as long ... [he] remembered friends and supporters throughout a 30-year career." According to ARIA spokesperson, Peter Rix, "It was my worst ARIA nightmare come true." Music commentator, Molly Meldrum, disapproved of Morris' speech length—they had already had a fracas at the ARIAs in 1988—Meldrum provided an even longer acceptance speech in 1993.

=== Presenters and performers ===
The ARIA Awards ceremony was hosted by Bob Geldof. Presenters and performers were:

Presenter(s)	Performer(s)	Ref.
Tina Arena	Daryl Braithwaite, Margaret Urlich	
Glenn A. Baker	Daryl Braithwaite, Margaret Urlich	
Peter Burgis	Daryl Braithwaite, Margaret Urlich	
Richard Clapton, John Farnham	Bull Sisters	
Maynard F# Crabbes	Bull Sisters	
Molly Meldrum	Bull Sisters	
Slim Dusty, Anne Kirkpatrick	Billy Thorpe with Mick Fleetwood's Zoo	
Mick Fleetwood, Richard Wilkins	Billy Thorpe with Mick Fleetwood's Zoo	
Michael Horrocks, John Williamson	Billy Thorpe with Mick Fleetwood's Zoo	
Craig McLachlan, Annette Shun Wah	Ratcat	
Peter O'Doherty, Reg Mombassa	Ratcat	
Paul Turner	Ratcat	
Brad Robinson	Archie Roach, Ruby Hunter, Paul Kelly, Charlie McMahon, Shane Howard	
Lisa Schouw	Archie Roach, Ruby Hunter, Paul Kelly, Charlie McMahon, Shane Howard	
Glenn Wheatley	Archie Roach, Ruby Hunter, Paul Kelly, Charlie McMahon, Shane Howard	

== Awards ==
The winners are listed in bold.

=== ARIA Awards ===
- Album of the Year
  - **Midnight Oil – Blue Sky Mining**
    - The Black Sorrows – Harley and Rose
    - John Farnham – Chain Reaction
    - INXS – X
    - Margaret Urlich – Safety in Numbers
- Single of the Year
  - **Absent Friends – "I Don't Want to Be With Nobody But You"**
    - Divinyls – "I Touch Myself"
    - John Farnham – "That's Freedom"
    - Hunters and Collectors – "Throw Your Arms Around Me"
    - Midnight Oil – "Blue Sky Mine"
- Highest Selling Album
  - **John Farnham – Chain Reaction**
- Highest Selling Single
  - **Craig McLachlan & Check 1-2 – "Mona"**
- Best Group
  - **Midnight Oil – Blue Sky Mining**
    - Boom Crash Opera – Look! Listen!!
    - The Black Sorrows – Harley and Rose
    - Hunters and Collectors – "Throw Your Arms Around Me"
    - INXS – X
- Best Female Artist
  - **Wendy Matthews** – **Émigré**
    - Kate Ceberano – Like Now
    - Grace Knight – Come In Spinner
    - Jenny Morris – "Piece of My Heart"
    - Margaret Urlich – Safety in Numbers
- Best Male Artist
  - **John Farnham – Chain Reaction**
    - Peter Blakeley – Harry's Café De Wheels
    - Jimmy Barnes – Two Fires
    - Daryl Braithwaite – Rise
    - Stephen Cummings – "Hell (You've Put Me Through)"
- Best New Talent
  - **Archie Roach – Charcoal Lane**
    - Doug Anthony Allstars – Icon
    - Sea Stories – Miller's Pond
    - Mary-Jo Starr – Too Many Movies
    - The Screaming Jets – "C'mon"
- Breakthrough Artist – Album
  - **Margaret Urlich – Safety in Numbers**
    - Absent Friends – Here's Looking Up Your Address
    - Wendy Matthews – Émigré
    - Archie Roach – Charcoal Lane
    - Southern Sons – Southern Sons
- Breakthrough Artist – Single
  - **Wendy Matthews – "Token Angels"**
    - Absent Friends – "I Don't Want to Be With Nobody But You"
    - Archie Roach – "Took the Children Away"
    - Seven Stories – "Sleeping Through Another War"
    - Southern Sons – "Heart in Danger"
- Best Country Album
  - **James Blundell – Hand It Down**
    - Luhrs & Crawford – Midnight In Paradise
    - Norma Murphy – Closer Now
    - Slim Dusty – Coming Home
    - Various Artists – Breaking Ground – New Directions in Country Music
- Best Independent Release
  - **The Killjoys – Ruby**
    - Blue Ruin – I'm Gonna Smile
    - Girl Monstar – "Joe Cool"
    - Roaring Jack – Through the Smoke of Innocence
    - Various Artists – Rockin Bethlehem: The Second Coming
- Best Indigenous Release
  - **Archie Roach – Charcoal Lane**
    - Coloured Stone – Crazy Mind
    - Various Artists – Australia All Over Macca's No. 4
    - Various Artists – From the Bush
    - Wild Pumpkins At Midnight – Little Victories
- Best Adult Contemporary Album
  - **Vince Jones and Grace Knight – Come in Spinner**
    - Andrew Pendlebury – Zing... Went To The Strings
    - Marc Hunter – Night & Day
    - Original Cast Recording – Paris
    - Tommy Emmanuel – Dare to Be Different
- Best Comedy Release
  - **John Clarke & Bryan Dawe – Great Interviews of the Twentieth Century**
    - The 12th Man – The 12th Man Again
    - The D-Generation – The Breakfast Tapes
    - Doug Anthony All Stars – Icon
    - HG Nelson & Roy Slaven – Wicket to Wicket

=== Fine Arts Awards ===
- Best Jazz Album
  - **Clarion Fracture Zone – Blue Shift**
  - **The Last Straw – The Last Straw**
    - Dale Barlow – Horn
    - Paul Grabowsky – The Moon and You
    - James Morrison – Snappy Doo
- Best Classical Album
  - **Stuart Challender, Sydney Symphony Orchestra – Sculthorpe: Orchestral Works**
    - David Helfgott – David Helfgott
    - Geoffrey Simon, Melbourne Symphony Orchestra – Percy Grainger: Orchestral Works
    - Hartley Newnham & Nicholas Routley – Hermit of Green Light
    - The Choir of Christ Church St Laurence – Victoria: Missa Surge Propera
- Best Children's Album
  - **Robyn Archer – Mrs Bottle's Burp** (Note: The full title for this album is Mrs Bottle's Absolutely Blurtingly Beautiful World-Beating Burp.)
    - Agro – The Agro Album
    - Don Spencer – Let's Have Fun
    - Glynn Nicholas & The Funky Fossils – The Dinosaur Album
    - John Williamson – JW's Family Album
- Best Original Soundtrack / Cast / Show Recording
  - **Jon English and David Mackay – Paris**
    - Brian May – Bloodmoon
    - Bruce Smeaton – Wendy Cracked a Walnut
    - Michael Askill & Nigel Westlake – Roads to Xanadu – The Genius That Was China
    - Vince Jones & Grace Knight – Come in Spinner

=== Artisan Awards ===
- Song of the Year
  - **Phil Buckle**, **John Farnham**, **Ross Fraser** – "**Burn for You**" **(John Farnham)**
    - Joe Camilleri and Nick Smith – "Harley + Rose" (The Black Sorrows)
    - Roger Mason – "Token Angels" (Wendy Matthews)
    - Midnight Oil – "Blue Sky Mine" (Midnight Oil)
    - Mark Seymour – "Turn a Blind Eye" (Hunters and Collectors)
- Producer of the Year
  - **Ross Fraser** – "**That's Freedom**" – **John Farnham**, "**Heart in Danger**" – **Southern Sons**, "**The Love We Make**" – **Girl Overboard**, "**Jukebox in Siberia**" and "**Tall Timber**" – **Skyhooks**
    - Martin Armiger – "Sophisticated Lady", "The Man I Love"/"I've Got You Under My Skin"/"She's Not There"/"Nature Boy" – Grace Knight/Vince Jones/Crowded House/Kate Ceberano
    - Ollie Olsen – "Monday Night by Satellite" – Max Q
    - Jeffrey Burstin, Joe Camilleri, Peter Luscombe – "Harley + Rose", "Angel Street", "Never Let Me Go", "Hold It up to the Mirror" – The Black Sorrows
    - Ricky Fataar – "Token Angels", "Woman's Gotta Have It" – Wendy Matthews
- Engineer of the Year
  - **David Nicholas** – "**Blue Sky Mine**", "**Forgotten Years**", "**King of the Mountain**", "**Bedlam Bridge**" – **Midnight Oil**, "**Suicide Blonde**", "**Disappear**" – **INXS**, "**Piece of My Heart**" – **Jenny Morris**
    - "Only You" – Bang the Drum
    - "Mona", "Amanda", "I Almost Felt Like Crying" – Craig McLachlan & Check 1-2
    - Doug Brady – "Strong as Steel", "I Need Your Body", "The Machine's Breaking Down" – Tina Arena, "Jukebox in Siberia" – Skyhooks, "Burn for You", "That's Freedom" – John Farnham, "Heart in Danger", "Always and Ever" – Southern Sons
    - Tony Espie – "Token Angels" – Wendy Matthews, "Somebody to Love" – Bughouse
- Best Video
  - **Claudia Castle** – "**Blue Sky Mine**" – **Midnight Oil**
    - "Permanent Friend" – Girl Overboard
    - "Suicide Blonde" – INXS
    - "That's Freedom" – John Farnham
    - "Dr Dynamite" – Mighty Big Crime
- Best Cover Art
  - **Livingstone Clarke, Midnight Oil – Midnight Oil – Blue Sky Mining**
    - Timothy Eames – Collected Works – Hunters & Collectors
    - Iva Davies and David Barnes – Code Blue – Icehouse
    - Jon Quinn – Chain Reaction – John Farnham
    - Capitol Art / Peter Blakeley – Harry's Café De Wheels – Peter Blakeley

== Achievement awards ==
=== Lifetime Achievement Award ===
- Ted Albert

=== Outstanding Achievement Award ===
- Midnight Oil

== ARIA Hall of Fame inductees ==
The Hall Of Fame inductees were:

- Don Burrows
- Peter Dawson
- Billy Thorpe
- Glenn Shorrock
