= Covers Volume 2 =

Covers, Volume 2

Studio album by Regine Velasquez
- Released: January 30, 2006
- Recorded: October – December 2005; Dragonlair Studio; Kahlil's Playground; Global Content Center
- Genres: Pop, jazz
- Length: 1:09:36
- Label: Viva
- Producers: Vic Del Rosario, Jr. (executive); Vincent del Rosario (executive); Regine Velasquez; Raul Mitra; Diane Velasquez-Roque (associate)

Regine Velasquez chronology
Covers, Vol. 1 (2004)	Covers, Volume 2 (2006)	Low Key (2008)

Singles from Covers, Vol. 2
- 1. "Hold Me In Your Arms" Released: January 2006

Covers, Volume 2 is the 13th studio album by Filipino singer-actress Regine Velasquez, released on January 30, 2006, by Viva Records in the Philippines in CD format and in digital download. The album contains different music genres including jazz and blues which is new to Velasquez' repertoire. It is her third cover album from Viva after R2K (1999) and Covers, Vol. 1 (2004), and includes covers of songs by Al Green, Paul McCartney and Wings, Blondie and Alanis Morissette among others. The first single released is Hold Me In Your Arms originally done by the Southern Sons. The album was certified platinum a month after its release.

== Background ==
Covers, Vol. 2 is her last album from Viva Records Corporation after eight years with five full-length studio albums, four movie soundtracks, one live album, one extended play, and two compilation albums. This album also marked for her 20th anniversary in Philippine showbiz.

Most of the songs were personally handpicked by Velasquez herself together with her sisters Cacai Velasquez-Mitra, also her manager and Diane Velasquez-Roque who is also her associate producer for this album. All of the international songs were presented with new arrangements in various musical genres. The album was produced by Velasquez with Raul Mitra and co-produced by South Border's Jay Durias. According to Velasquez, it was her most ambitious album to date because of innovative arrangements done with the songs but less expensive project than its predecessor, Covers, Vol. 1.

== Reviews ==
Professional ratings
Review scores
Source	Rating
BuzzStation	(Breakthrough)
Manila Standard Music Review	(Favorable)

Covers, Vol. 2 received generally positive reviews from music critics. Edgar Cruz of Buzzstation from the Daily Tribune wrote that Velasquez did a good job with the album stating "she gives them her own twists, which invigorate the highly textured songs with a feel and flavor entirely its own." While Ruel J. Mendoza of Manila Standard gave the album a favorable review. He also praised the album's arrangers, producers and musicians for re-inventing the arrangements of the cover songs. Veronica R. Samio of Pilipino Star Ngayon appreciated the style that Velasquez did with the original songs like "Blue Suede Shoes" making it a bluesy improvisation and Paula Abdul's pop "Straight Up" to a jazz repertoire.

== Track listing ==
No.	Title	Writer(s)	Original Artist(s)	Length
1.	"Call Me"	Debbie Harry, Giorgio Moroder	Blondie	03:58
2.	"Head Over Feet"	Alanis Morissette, Glen Ballard	Alanis Morissette	04:57
3.	"Let's Stay Together"	Al Green, Willie Mitchell, Al Jackson Jr.	Al Green	04:15
4.	"Come Together"	John Lennon, Paul McCartney	The Beatles	04:53
5.	"Never Give Up"	Amy Holland, Jeff Day	Amy Holland	04:19
6.	"Kiss On My List"	Janna Allen, Daryl Hall	Daryl Hall and John Oates	04:04
7.	"Silly Love Song"	Paul McCartney, Linda McCartney	Wings	04:43
8.	"Straight Up"	Elliot Wolff	Paula Abdul	04:54
9.	"Hold Me In Your Arms"	Jack Jones, Phil Buckle	Southern Sons	04:27
10.	"Xanadu"	Jeff Lynne	Olivia Newton-John & Electric Light Orchestra	04:12
11.	"Take A Chance" (featuring The Company)	Benny Andersson, Björn Ulvaeus	ABBA	04:03
12.	"Still In Love"	Brian McKnight	Brian McKnight	04:26
13.	"Blue Suede Shoes"	Carl Perkins	Carl Perkins/Elvis Presley	03:22
14.	"So Much In Love" (featuring Vince Alaras)	Frank Musker, Dominic Bugati	Sheena Easton	04:15
15.	"On The Radio"	Donna Summer, Giorgio Moroder	Donna Summer	04:18
16.	"Kiss"	Prince Nelson	Prince and The Revolution	04:36

== Album credits ==
Personnel

- Vic del Rosario Jr. – executive producer
- Vincent del Rosario – executive producer
- Diane Velasquez-Roque – associate producer
- Regine Velasquez-Alcasid – producer
- Raul Mitra – producer, recording engineer
- Jay Durias – producer
- Voltaire Orpiano – recording engineer
- Erik Payumo – recording engineer
- Lani Sarong – production assistant
- Sam S. Samson – graphic designer
- Jun de Leon – photography
- Aria Productions – management

Production

- Regine Velasquez – vocals, background vocals
- Arnie Mendaros – vocal arranger, background vocals (track 7)
- Cacai Velasquez-Mitra – background vocals (track 2)
- Boses-Marnie Jereza – background vocals (track 7)
- Bubbles Ganotan – background vocals (track 7)
- The Company – background vocals (track 11)
- Babsie Molina – background vocals (track 15)
- Sylvia Macaraeg – background vocals (track 15)
- Raul Mitra – arranger (tracks 1, 9 and 12), mixer (tracks 1, 4, 5, 6, 7, 10, 11 and 13)
- Jay Durias – arranger, mixer, co-producer (tracks 8 and 14), piano (track 8)
- Noel Mendez – arranger (tracks 1, 5 and 13), guitars (tracks 1, 3, 5 and 13), acoustic guitar (tracks 2, 5 and 13)
- Nino Regalado – arranger (tracks 2 and 6)
- Monet Silvestre – arranger (track 3)
- Cezar Aguas – arranger (track 4), guitars (track 4)
- Soc Mina – arranger (track 7)
- Ric Mercado – arranger (track 10), guitars (track 10)
- Moy Ortiz – arranger (track 11), background vocal (track 15)
- Mon Faustino – arranger (track 15)
- Gerard Salonga – arranger (track 16)
- Erik Payumo – mixer (track 16)
- Bobby Rasco – bass (track 1)
- Tots Tolentino – sax (track 1), flute (track 12)
- Jopat Gragera – oboe (track 2)
- Meong Pacana – bass (tracks 3, 4 and 13)
- Liza Lopez – strings-cello (tracks 3 and 15)
- Theodore Amper – strings-cello (tracks 9)
- Proceso Yusi – strings-violin (tracks 3 and 15)
- Antonio Bautista – strings-violin (tracks 3 and 15)
- Macky Chua – strings-violin (track 9)
- Karla Hotchkiss – strings-violin (track 9)
- Marites Ibero – strings-viola (tracks 3 and 15)
- Diane Acacio – strings-viola (track 9)
- George San Jose – drums (track 4)
- Mike Alba – percussion (track 5)
- Tek Faustino – acoustic box (track 13)
- Mel Villena – harmonica (track 13)
- All songs are recorded and mixed at Dragonlair Studio (except when noted)
- Tracks 8 and 14 are recorded and mixed at Kahlil's Playground
- Track 16 is recorded and mixed at Global Content Center

== See also ==
- Regine Velasquez discography
- List of best-selling albums in the Philippines
