= APRA Music Awards of 1994 =

Annual Australian music awards

- Date: 1994
- Location: Australia
- Website: apra-amcos.com.au

The Australasian Performing Right Association Awards of 1994 (generally known as APRA Awards) are a series of awards held in 1994. The APRA Music Awards were presented by Australasian Performing Right Association (APRA) and the Australasian Mechanical Copyright Owners Society (AMCOS).

== Awards ==
Winners are shown in bold with known nominees shown in plain.

Award	Nominations	Result
Songwriter of the Year	**Neil Finn**	Won
Ted Albert Memorial Award	**Ian "Molly" Meldrum**	Won
Song of the Year	**"Distant Sun"** (**Neil Finn**) by **Crowded House**	Won
Song of the Year	"Do You Love Me?" (Nick Cave) by Nick Cave	Nominated
Song of the Year	"Green Limousine" (Michael Spiby) by Michael Spiby	Nominated
Song of the Year	"Helping Hand" (Paul Woseen, Grant Walmsley, David Gleeson, Richard Lara, Bradley Heaney) by The Screaming Jets	Nominated
Song of the Year	"My Heavy Friend" (Anthony Kopa, Geoffrey Wells) by The Truth	Nominated
Country Song of the Year	**"Game of Love"** (**John Ross Beatty**, **Heather Field**, **James Gillard**) by **John Beatty**	Won
Country Song of the Year	"Good Woman" (John Williamson) by John Williamson	Nominated
Country Song of the Year	"Ringer From The Top End" (Joy McKean) by Slim Dusty	Nominated
Country Song of the Year	"She's My Ute" (Colin Buchanan, Lee Kernaghan, Rodney McCormack) by Lee Kernaghan	Nominated
Country Song of the Year	"Three Chain Road" (Lee Kernaghan, Garth Porter) by Lee Kernaghan	Nominated
Contemporary Classical Composition of the Year	**"Devil's Music"** (**Andrew Schultz**) by **Sydney Symphony Orchestra**	Won
Contemporary Classical Composition of the Year	"Colour Red Your Mouth Heart" (Gerard Brophy) by Queensland Symphony Orchestra	Nominated
Contemporary Classical Composition of the Year	"Grathawai" (Anne Boyd) by Adelaide Symphony Orchestra	Nominated
Contemporary Classical Composition of the Year	"In A Brilliant Blaze" (Brenton Broadstock) by Camerata (of the Australian Youth Orchestra)	Nominated
Contemporary Classical Composition of the Year	"Veni Creator Spiritus" (Ross Edwards) by Tasmanian Symphony Orchestra	Nominated
Children's Composition of the Year	**"Hot Potato"** (**Murray Cook**, **Jeffrey Fatt**, **Anthony Field**, **John Field**, **Gregory Page**) by **The Wiggles**	Won
Children's Composition of the Year	"The Monkey Dance" (Murray Cook, Jeff Fatt, Anthony Field, John Field, Gregory Page) by The Wiggles	Nominated
Children's Composition of the Year	"Mummy Song" a.k.a. "I Want My Mummy" (Colin Buchanan) by Colin Buchanan	Nominated
Children's Composition of the Year	"Totally Wild" (Christopher Harriott) by Christopher Harriott	Nominated
Jazz Composition of the Year	**"Favourite"** (**Alexander Hewetson**, **James Robertson**, **Terepai Richmond**, **Timothy Rollinson**, **Scott Saunders**) by **DIG**	Won
Jazz Composition of the Year	"Can't Say" (Colin Snape, Albert Dadon) by Al Bare	Nominated
Jazz Composition of the Year	"Melon" (John Foreman) by John Foreman	Nominated
Jazz Composition of the Year	"Re-Invent Yourself" (Alexander Hewetson, James Robertson, Terepai Richmond, Timothy Rollinson, Scott Saunders) by DIG	Nominated
Jazz Composition of the Year	"Sweet and Hot" (Paul Baker) by Maree Montgomery	Nominated
Most Performed Foreign Work	**"The River of Dreams"** (**Billy Joel**) by **Billy Joel**	Won
Most Performed Foreign Work	"All About Soul" (Billy Joel) by Billy Joel	Nominated
Most Performed Foreign Work	"Can't Help Falling in Love" (Hugo Peretti, Luigi Creatore, George David Weiss) by UB40	Nominated
Most Performed Foreign Work	"Please Forgive Me" (Bryan Adams, Robert Lange) by Bryan Adams	Nominated
Most Performed Foreign Work	"Runaway Train" (Dave Pirner) by Soul Asylum	Nominated
Most Performed Australian Work	**"Never Miss Your Water"** (**Mark Lizotte**, **John Daniel Tate**) by **Diesel**	Won
Most Performed Australian Work	"Distant Sun" (Neil Finn) by Crowded House	Nominated
Most Performed Australian Work	"Don't Tell Me What To Do" (Suze DeMarchi, Eddie Parise, Dave Leslie) by UB40	Nominated
Most Performed Australian Work	"Seemed Like A Good Idea" (John Farnham, Ross Wilson, Ross Fraser) by John Farnham	Nominated
Most Performed Australian Work	"You Were There" (Phillip Buckle) by Southern Sons	Nominated
Most Performed Australian Work Overseas	**"Weather with You"** (**Neil Finn**, **Tim Finn**) by **Crowded House**	Won
Best Film Score	**The Silver Brumby** (**Tassos Ioannides**) by **Tassos Ioannides**	Won
Best Film Score	"Bedevil" (Carl Vine) by Carl Vine	Nominated
Best Film Score	"Black River" (Andrew Schultz, Julianne Schultz) by Andrew Schultz	Nominated
Best Film Score	"Gross Misconduct" (Bruce Rowland) by Bruce Rowland	Nominated
Best Film Score	"The Nostradamus Kid" (Chris Neal) by Chris Neal	Nominated
Best Television Theme	**Mission Top Secret** (**Ian Davidson**) by **Ian Davidson**	Won
Best Television Theme	"The Damnation of Harvey McHugh" (Chris Neal) by Chris Neal	Nominated
Best Television Theme	"Heartbreak High" (Todd Hunter) by Todd Hunter	Nominated
Best Television Theme	"Heartland" (David Page) by David Page	Nominated
Best Television Theme	"Snowy" (Michael Easton, Michael Atkinson) by Michael Easton & Michael Atkinson	Nominated

== See also ==
- Music of Australia
