= Fantasy (Regine Velasquez album) =

Studio album by Regine Velasquez-Alcasid
- Released: November 21, 2010
- Genre: Pop, OPM, dance, R&B
- Language: Filipino, English
- Label: Universal Records (Philippines)
- Producer: Ramon Chuaying (Executive); Kathleen Dy-Go (Executive); Peter Chan (Executive); Ito Rapadas (Executive); Regine Velasquez-Alcasid (Executive)

Regine Velasquez-Alcasid chronology
Low Key (2008)	Fantasy (2010)	Hulog Ka Ng Langit (2013)

Alternative covers
- Black & White CD cover

Alternative covers
- inside CD cover

Singles from Fantasy
- 1. "Fantasy (promotional single)" Released: November 2010; 2. "You Don't Know" Released: December 2010; 3. "Been Waiting" Released: December 2010; 4. "True Romance" Released: January 2011

Fantasy is the 15th studio album by Filipino singer Regine Velasquez-Alcasid. The album was released on November 21, 2010 by Universal Records, which was her second full-length studio album under Universal after Low Key in 2008. The two-disc album contains both pop and mid-tempo sounds, as well as some softer and more contemporary melodies. The first disc contains new Original Pilipino Music (OPM) materials while the second disc contains cover songs from various artists. This two-disc album also consists of two packaging editions, the "colored one" and the "black & white edition", with each containing collector's item photo cards and the CDs. The photos used were taken by photographer Mark Nicdao. The album debuted at number one spot and was certified Gold Award after two weeks upon released. Fantasy was nominated at the 24th Philippine Awit Awards for Album of the Year and Best Performance by a Female Recording Artist for the song You Don't Know.

== Background ==
For this album, Velasquez pointed that she would like to work with young composers and assemble it with entirely new OPM materials than covering songs which done from her previous albums, Covers, Vol. 1, Covers, Vol. 2 and Low Key. And throughout the project, she worked with her now husband singer-songwriter Ogie Alcasid, with whom she had collaborated most of her hit songs from her previous albums. Though the second disc of the album contains mostly cover songs talking about being in love and marriage, the songs were mainly chosen by Velasquez herself going through her own wedding preparations at that time with Alcasid. The album also includes a song called S.M.I.L.E. written by Noel Mendez that became the theme song for Operation Smile after Velasquez became one of the ambassador to the foundation together with the main theme song of TV musical series Diva called Walang Iba and the love theme of TV romantic comedy series I ♥ You Pare! penned by Janno Gibbs called True Romance, both which Velasquez starred aired over GMA-7.

== Awards and Accolades ==
Year	Award	Category	Result
2011	Awit Awards	Best Performance by a Female Recording Artist	Nominated
2011	Awit Awards	Album of the Year	Nominated
2011	3rd Star Awards For Music 2011	Female Pop Artist of the Year	Nominated
2011	3rd Star Awards For Music 2011	Female Recording Artist ("You Don't Know")	Nominated
2011	3rd Star Awards For Music 2011	Music Video of the Year	Nominated

== Track listing ==
Disc One
No.	Title	Writer(s)	Length
1.	"You Don't Know"	Ogie Alcasid	4:07
2.	"Been Waiting"	Francis Salazar	4:16
3.	"Always" (featuring Jay Perillo)	Monet Silvestre	3:51
4.	"This Time"	Nyoy Volante	3:12
5.	"True Romance"	Janno Gibbs	4:04
6.	"Sana'y Laging Ganito" (originally done by Karylle)	Edwin Marollano	4:34
7.	"OK Lang Ako"	Chito Miranda	3:41
8.	"Fairy Tale"	Noel Mendez	4:23
9.	"Smile"	Robin Nievera	4:55
10.	"The Funny One (Ogie's Theme)"	Isabella Ledesma	4:17
11.	"S.M.I.L.E." (Operation Smile theme)	Noel Mendez	4:01
12.	"Walang Iba" (theme from the TV series Diva)	Ogie Alcasid	3:56

Disc Two
No.	Title	Writer(s)	Original Artist(s)	Length
1.	"Fantasy"	Gerard Kenny	Gerard Kenny, Drey Shepperd	3:26
2.	"All My Life"	Gerry Beckley	America	3:45
3.	"I Go Crazy"	Paul Davis	Paul Davis	3:51
4.	"What About Love"	Brian Allen, Sheron Alton, Jim Vallance	Toronto	3:46
5.	"Papa Don't Preach"	Brian Elliot, additional lyrics by Madonna	Madonna	5:17
6.	"You And Me"	Jason Wade, Jude Cole	Lifehouse	4:15
7.	"Without Me"	Clair Marlo	Clair Marlo	4:01
8.	"Falling in Love in a Coffee Shop"	Landon Pigg	Landon Pigg	4:28
9.	"Love Will Keep Us Alive"	Jim Capaldi, Paul Carrack, Peter Vale	The Eagles	3:30
10.	"Dying"	John Ondrasik	Five for Fighting	3:48

== See also ==
- Regine Velasquez discography
