= Girl Overboard =

Girl Overboard may refer to:

- Girl Overboard (band), an Australian pop music group, active from 1985-1993
- Girl Overboard (1929 film), a lost film
- Girl Overboard (1937 film), an American mystery film
