= Norma O'Hara Murphy =

Australian country singer

- Also known as: Norma Murphy
- Born: Murray Valley, Victoria Australia
- Genres: Country
- Labels: Country Records (1982-1984), Selection Records label (1985-1987), Festival Records (1988-1994), Larrikin Records (1995-1999), Bony Mountain Music (2010-present)
- Website: www.normaoharamurphy.com

Norma O'Hara Murphy is an Australian country music singer and songwriter. Her album Closer Now was nominated for ARIA Award for Best Country Album at the ARIA Music Awards of 1991. In 1989 she was inducted into the Australian Country Music Hands of Fame. She has won five Golden Guitars.

== Biography ==
Norma O'Hara Murphy was born and raised in the Murray Valley region of Victoria. Her mother's family were pioneers of the area. She is a third generation Irish/Australian.

=== 1982-1987: Career beginnings ===
In 1982, O'Hara Murphy recorded her debut album in Coffs Harbour. Rodeo Queen was released on the Country Records Label and was a finalist in the Country Music Awards of Australia (CMAA).

In 1985, O'Hara Murphy recorded her second studio album in Sydney. Vanishing Horsemen, was released on the Selection Records label. In 1986, she won her first Golden Guitar for "How the Firequeen Crossed the Swamp" and the Tamworth Songwriting Association Award for "Stumpy". In 1987, O'Hara Murphy released River Gums & Mallee Dust.

=== 1988-1999: Continued success and ARIA nomination ===
In 1988, O'Hara Murphy signed with Festival Records and wrote and produced her fourth studio album, Colours, released in 1989. In 1990, Closer Now was released. At the ARIA Music Awards of 1991, the album was nominated for ARIA Award for Best Country Album. In August 1991, the compilation Norma's Best was released featuring the single "The Banks of the Bogan", which peaked at number 147 on the ARIA Chart. The album peaked at number 132 on the ARIA Chart.

In 1992, O'Hara Murphy recorded Winds of Change at Enrec Studio. Her sixth studio album was released in 1993. The song "Barbwire & Bamboo" was nominated for a golden guitar in the heritage category, while "Tamworth (the song)" won O'Hara Murphy the Golden Guitar for Best Female Vocal Award.

In 1995 O'Hara Murphy moved to Larrikin Records and recorded her seventh studio album, Sweet Rain. In 1999 she produced and released the live album, Live in Bundaberg, through her own label Gumleaf Music. The album was recorded at The Brothers Club with Bundaberg musicians. Shortly after O'Hara Murphy took a break from recording.

=== 2000-present: Break and return to music, The Celtic Connection ===
The beginning of the twenty-first century O'Hara Murphy concentrated more on writing. She wrote and produced another two Golden Guitars winning songs, performed by Slim Dusty in 2001 and 2003.

In 2010, O'Hara Murphy returned to the recording studio and released Whiskey Gully Road on Bony Mountain Music. The title track was a finalist in the 2011 QMusic Awards. "Goin' For Glory" won the Stan Coster Bush Ballad Songwriting Award.

In 2011 O'Hara Murphy released her ninth studio album, The Celtic Connection (volume one) and she was a Finalist at the Celtic Awards in Glen Innes. A second Celtic Collection followed in 2013. In 2014, O'Hara Murphy won Australian Celtic Artist of the Year.

In October 2014, O'Hara Murphy released her eleventh studio album, Solid Gold, and was a return to country music. O'Hara Murphy was a finalist at the 2016 CMAA.

In 2017, O'Hara Murphy released Sweet Love.

In December 2019, O'Hara Murphy released her thirteenth studio album, Bloodlines. The album was nominated for Australian Celtic Awards in 2020.

== Discography ==
=== Studio albums ===
List of albums, with details and Australia chart positions
Title	Details	Peak chart positions
Title	Details	AUS
Rodeo Queen	Released: 1982; Label: Country Records	-
Vanishing Horsemen	Released: 1985; Label: Selection Records	-
River Gums & Mallee Dust	Released: 1987; Label: Selection Records	-
Colours	Released: 1989; Label: Festival Records	-
Closer Now	Released: 1990; Label: Festival Records	-
Winds of Change	Released: 1993; Label: Festival Records	-
Sweet Rain	Released: 1995; Label: Larrikin Records	-
Whiskey Gully Road	Released: 2010; Label: Bony Mountain Music	-
The Celtic Connection (volume one)	Released: 2011; Label: Bony Mountain Music	-
The Celtic Connection (volume two)	Released: 2013; Label: Bony Mountain Music	-
Solid Gold	Released: October 2014; Label: Bony Mountain Music	-
Sweet Love	Released: 27 October 2017; Label: Bony Mountain Music	-
Bloodlines	Released: 20 December 2019; Label: Bony Mountain Music	-

=== Live albums ===
List of albums, with details and Australia chart positions
Title	Details	Peak chart positions
Title	Details	AUS
Live in Bundaberg	Released: 1999; Label: Gumleaf Music	-

=== Compilation albums ===
List of albums, with details and Australia chart positions
Title	Details	Peak chart positions
Title	Details	AUS
Norma's Best	Released: August 1991; Label: Festival Records	132
The Best of Me	Released: January 2011; Label: Checked Label	-
The Celtic Connection Vol. 1 & 2 (Collector's Pack)	Released: September 2015; Label: Checked Label; Note: 2xCD set	-

== Awards ==
=== ARIA Music Awards ===
The ARIA Music Awards is an annual awards ceremony that recognises excellence, innovation, and achievement across all genres of Australian music.

Year	Nominee / work	Award	Result
1991	Closer Now	Best Country Album	Nominated

=== Country Music Awards of Australia ===
The Country Music Awards of Australia (CMAA) (also known as the Golden Guitar Awards) is an annual awards night held in January during the Tamworth Country Music Festival, celebrating recording excellence in the Australian country music industry. They have been held annually since 1973.

Year	Nominee / work	Award	Result (wins only)
1986	"How the Fire Queen Crossed the Swamp"	Heritage Award	Won
1989	herself	Hands of Fame	imprinted
1991	"Sarah's Memory"	Female Vocalist of the Year	Won
1993	"Tamworth"	Female Vocalist of the Year	Won
2001	"Paddy William" (performed by Slim Dusty, written by Norma O'Hara Murphy)	Bush Ballad of the Year	Won
2003	"Just An Old Cattle Dog" (performed by Slim Dusty, written by Norma O'Hara Murphy)	Bush Ballad of the Year	Won

=== Tamworth Songwriters Awards ===
The Tamworth Songwriters Association (TSA) is an annual songwriting contest for original country songs, awarded in January at the Tamworth Country Music Festival. They commenced in 1986. Norma O'Hara Murphy won three awards in that time.

Year	Nominee / work	Award	Result (wins only)
1986	"Stumpy" by Norma Murphy	New Songwriter Award	Won
1992	"Take a Cutting" by Norma O'Hara Murphy	Comedy/ Novelty Song of the Year	Won
1996	Norma O'Hara Murphy	Songmaker awards	awarded
