= Doug Anthony All Stars discography =

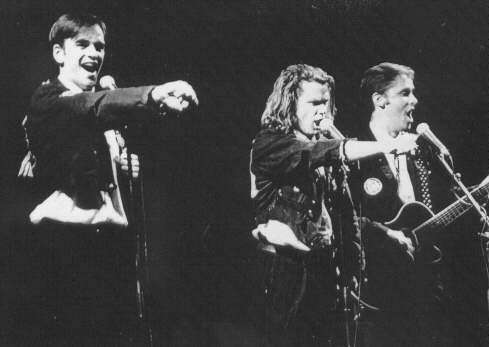
- Tim Ferguson, Paul McDermott and Richard Fidler performing in Hobart, Tasmania
- Studio albums: 1
- Extended plays: 2
- Live albums: 3
- Singles: 3
- B-sides: 2
- Video albums: 5
- Music videos: 1

The discography of the Doug Anthony All Stars, an Australian musical comedy group, consists of one studio album, two EPs, three singles, three live albums, three video releases and three DVD releases. One studio album, Blue, was recorded, but remains officially unreleased.

== Albums ==
List of albums, with selected chart positions
Title	Album details	Peak chart positions
Title	Album details	AUS
DAAS Icon	Released: May 1990; Label: DAAS Kapital/ CBS Records; Format: Vinyl, Cassette, CD	42
Dead & Alive	Released: December 1993; Label: EastWest; Format: Cassette, CD	72
DAAS Bootleg - Live in Edinburgh	Released: 1994; Label: DASS; Format: CD; Recorded at the Pleasance Theatre Assembly Rooms in Edinburgh in August 1993	-
The Last Concert	Released: 1995; Label: ABC Music; Format: Cassette; Recorded at the Footbridge Theatre in Sydney in 1994	-

== Extended plays ==
List of extended plays
Title	EP details
Let It Swing	Released: 1986; Label: DASS; Format: Cassette

== Video albums ==
List of video albums
Title	Details
Live at The National Theatre	Released: 1990; Label: Polygram Home Video; Format: VHS
The Edinburgh Years	Released: 1992; Label: DASS; Format: VHS
Dead & Alive	Released: 1993; Label: Warner Music Vision; Format: VHS
The Unlimited Uncollectible Sterling Deluxe Edition	Released: November 2008; Label: ABC DVD; Format: 2x DVD; Compilation DVD
