= Nicholas Routley =

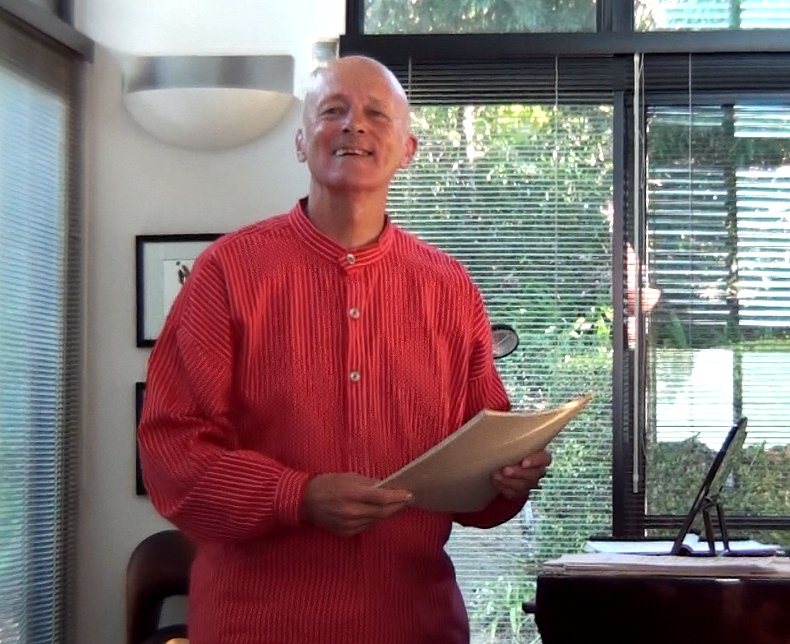
- Routley photographed in May 2016

Background information
- Born: 26 June 1947 (age 77); England

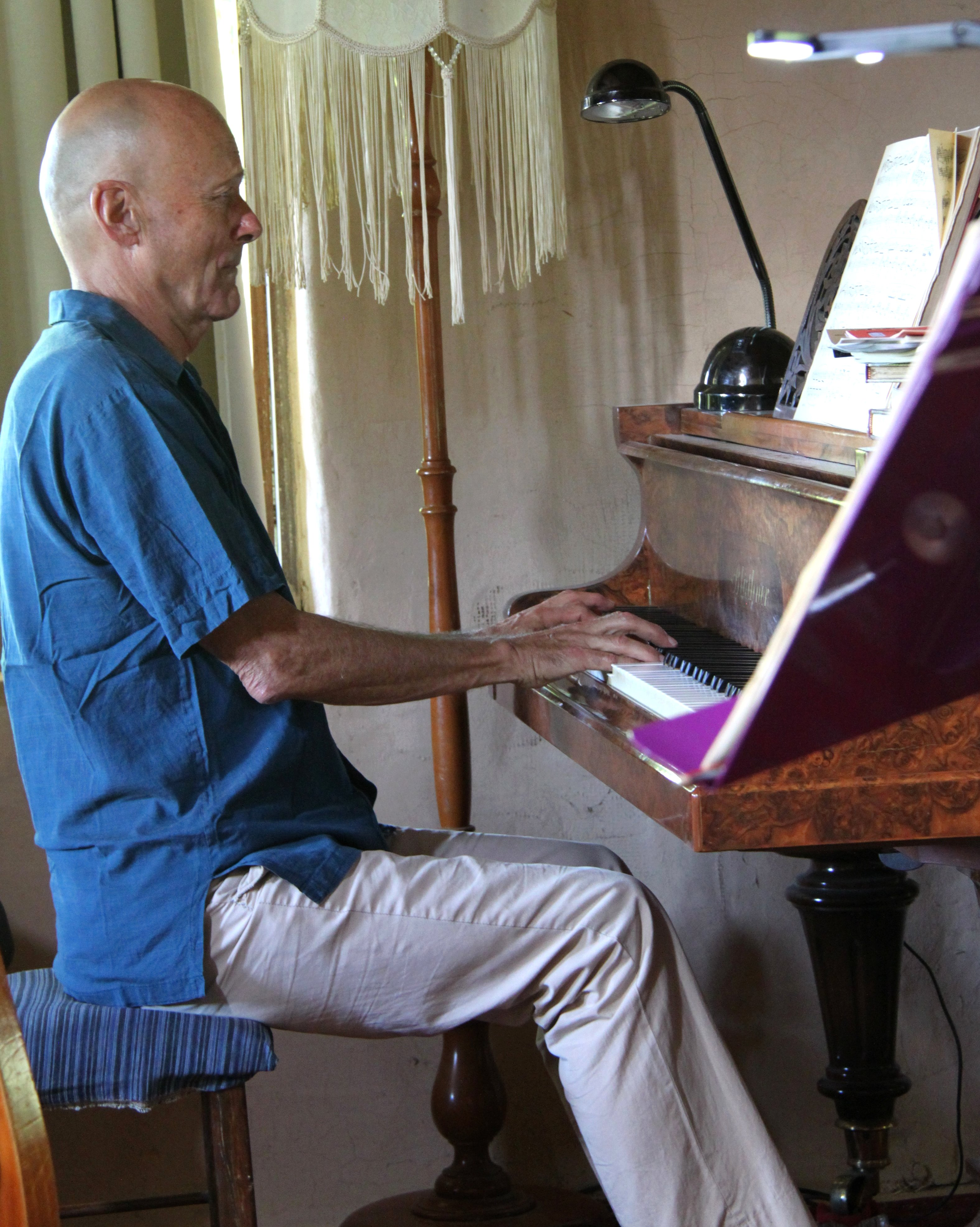
Routley in April 2016

Nicholas Routley born 26 June 1947 is an Australian pianist, conductor, accompanist and composer, and the founding director of the Sydney Chamber Choir. Born in England, he was educated in Edinburgh and studied music at St John's College, Cambridge; he immigrated to Australia in 1975 to take up a position at the Department of Music at the University of Sydney. Since 2009 he has resided in the Northern Rivers region of New South Wales (Lismore area) where he is on the teaching staff of the Northern Rivers Conservatorium of Music.

== Awards and nominations ==
=== ARIA Music Awards ===
The ARIA Music Awards is an annual awards ceremony that recognises excellence, innovation, and achievement across all genres of Australian music. They commenced in 1987.

Year	Nominee / work	Award	Result	Ref.
1991	Hermit of Green Light (with Hartley Newnham)	Best Classical Album	Nominated	
