= Ruby (The Killjoys album) =

Studio album by The Killjoys
- Released: October 1990
- Recorded: December 1989 – May 1990
- Studio: Sing Sing Studios
- Label: Audrey Records

The Killjoys chronology
Audrey (1989)	Ruby (1990)	Spin (1991)

Ruby is the debut studio album by Australian pop band, The Killjoys. The album was released in October 1990. At the ARIA Music Awards of 1991, the album won the ARIA Award for Best Independent Release.

== Reception ==
Professional ratings
Review scores
Source	Rating
AllMusic	4.5/5 stars

Stewart Mason from AllMusic said "Singer Anna Burley has a cool, detached voice that sounds just right over Craig Pilkington's strummy acoustics and muted trumpet. Caroline Schwerkolt's dreamy vibes are the group's other main sonic signature, adding a lovely texture to nearly every song on the album. Burley's lyrics aren't as memorable as the folk-tinged melodies, though the wistful 'Michael Told Me' does an admirable job of recalling a lost love without whininess or recrimination. A fantastic debut, Ruby shows that the spirit of twee pop was alive and well between its early-'80s and mid-'90s heydays."

== Track listing ==
1. "One & Only" - 2:33
2. "One More Hour" - 3:43
3. "Fall Around Me" - 4:09
4. "Michael Told Me" - 3:17
5. "I Don't Really Know" - 2:15
6. "Sometimes Blue" - 3:17
7. "Wish" - 2:58
8. "Don't Let Me Down" - 3:08
9. "The Greener Side" - 3:05
10. "I Can't Believe" - 2:43
11. Shifting Sands" - 3:35
12. "Take Me Down" - 4:06

== Charts ==
Chart (1991)	Peak position
Australian Albums (ARIA)	144
