= Nothing but the Truth (Southern Sons album) =

Nothing But The Truth
- Original 1992 release

Studio album by Southern Sons
- Released: November 6, 1992 (Australia)
- Recorded: 1991–1992
- Genre: Pop rock, soft rock
- Length: 54:46
- Label: RCA Records
- Producer: Louie Shelton

Southern Sons chronology
Train Tracks (1991)	Nothing But The Truth (1992)	Truth (1993)

Singles from Nothing But The Truth
- 1. "Lead Me to Water" Released: September 1992; 2. "Can't Wait Any Longer" Released: November 1992; 3. "You Were There" Released: March 1993; 4. "Sometimes" Released: 1993; 5. "Silent Witnesses" Released: 7 November 1993

1993 Re-Release Cover

Nothing But The Truth is the second studio album by Australian music group Southern Sons. The album was released in Australia in November 1992 and reached number 26 on the ARIA charts. The album produced by Louis Shelton and released through RCA Records, was re-released in 1993 with the bonus track, "Silent Witnesses". The album produced five singles, and was also released in the Australian iTunes Store as a digital download in 2010.

== Track listing ==
1. "Shelter" (J. Jones, P. Buckle) – 5:18
2. "Lead Me to Water" (P. Buckle) – 4:32
3. "Sometimes" (P. Buckle, P. Bowman, M. Spiro) – 3:54
4. "Is It Any Wonder" (P. Buckle) – 4:15
5. "Can't Wait Any Longer" (P. Buckle, J. Jones) – 4:24
6. "You Were There" (P. Buckle) – 3:58
7. "Nothing But The Truth" (P. Buckle) – 5:11
8. "Still Love You So" (P. Buckle) – 4:45
9. "Wildest Love" (P. Buckle) – 4:05
10. "Can't Breathe" (J. Jones) – 5:17
11. "So Unkind" (P. Buckle, J. Jones) – 4:23
12. "Silent Witnesses" (1993 reissue bonus track) (P. Buckle) – 4:46
13. "You Were There" (Unplugged) (1993 reissue bonus track) (P. Buckle)
14. "Lead Me to Water" (Unplugged) (1993 reissue bonus track) (P. Buckle)

== Personnel ==
- Jack Jones – lead vocals, guitars
- Phil Buckle – guitars, backing vocals
- Virgil Donati – drums, keyboards
- Geoff Cain – bass
- David Hirschfelder – string arrangements and keyboards on "You Were There"
- Geoff Hales – additional percussion

== Chart positions ==
Chart (1992)	Peak position
Australian Albums (ARIA)	26
