= The Killjoys (Australian band) =

Australian band

- Origin: Melbourne, Victoria, Australia
- Genres: Pop; folk
- Years active: 1987–2001
- Labels: Audrey; MXL/Mushroom/Festival
- Past members: see Members

The Killjoys were an Australian pop and folk band formed in 1987. The mainstay members were Anna Burley on lead vocals and guitar and Craig Pilkington on lead guitar and vocals. They attracted a wide following in the vibrant pub scene. Their debut album, Ruby won the ARIA Award for Best Independent Release at the ARIA Music Awards of 1991.

== History ==
=== 1987-1989: Band beginnings and Audrey ===
The Killjoys were formed in 1987 in Melbourne by Anna Burley on lead vocals and guitar (ex-Wild Science), Jeremy Craigie-Smith on bass guitar; Will Larsen on drums (ex-Michael Angelo and the Ceiling); Craig Pilkington on lead guitar, trumpet and vocals (ex-Wild Science) and Caroline Schwerkolt on vibraphone and keyboards. They were one of the promising bands, which emerged in the late 1980s including Sea Stories, the Fauves, the Hollowmen, the Glory Box, Ripe, Autohaze and Pray TV.

Prior to her time in Wild Science, Anna Burley did a stint in the Melbourne indie band, Blah Zero ... during the mid-1980s. Four songs were recorded at Richmond Recorders during that period, with Geof Rey Evans on guitar, Zoe Zurbo on bass and Larry Tidswell on drums. Tracks included Insecure, Eastern Zone and Russian Roulette.

Burley and Pilkington's previous group, Wild Science, had split into two different outfits, the Killjoys and Violet Town. Violet Town's other members were Wayne (Buz) Hissock on guitar and vocals, Warren Pitts on keyboards and vocals, Peter Van on drums, and Luke Blackburn on bass guitar and vocals. According to Australian musicologist, Ian McFarlane, the Killjoys' "sound mixed appealing pop melodies and bittersweet folk harmonies with a jazzy edge."

In mid-February 1989 the group issued a five-track extended play, Audrey, as a mini-album and as a music cassette on their own label, Audrey – it was co-produced by the band with Peter Jackson. They launched the released in Canberra and The Canberra Times' correspondent observed that "the music of the Killjoys has been described as a light blend of jazz, folk and pop." The EP had been recorded in the previous Easter but its release was delayed as the group gathered funding for its pressing and distribution. The tracks were co-written by Burley and Pilkington. Their debut single, "Fall Around Me", was released in November 1989. During 1990 they provided a cover version of the Seekers' 1964 single, "I'll Never Find Another You", for the tribute album, Used and Recovered.

=== 1990-1992: Ruby & Spin ===
In October 1990, The Killjoys released their debut studio album, Ruby, which was co-produced by Mark Woods and the group. AllMusic's Stewart Mason opined that "Burley has a cool, detached voice that sounds just right over [Pilkington]'s strummy acoustics and muted trumpet. [Schwerkolt]'s dreamy vibes are the group's other main sonic signature, adding a lovely texture to nearly every song." At the ARIA Music Awards of 1991 Ruby won the ARIA Award for Best Independent Release. As the group celebrated on a Sydney ferry, Schwerkolt accidentally dropped the trophy into Darling Harbour. Burley explained "She was really upset. She'd actually taken it off Craig because she thought he was too drunk. They hired a diver the next day... he couldn't find anything."

The album provided a single, "Michael Told Me". In November 1991 they released a four-track EP, Spin, which included "Calling Me On". It was produced by Tony Espie. By that time Craigie-Smith had been replaced on bass guitar by Daniel Palamara (ex-Michael Angelo and the Ceiling) who, in turn, was replaced by Michael Hohnen. The group travelled to the United Kingdom, late in 1992, to record their second album.

=== 1993-1996: A Million Suns and line-up changes ===
In March 1993, The Killjoys released their second studio album, A Million Suns, with Craig Leon. Burley detailed their choice of Leon, saying "He had such a diverse range. He'd done so many interesting things. We wanted someone who was into what we were doing..." Nic Haygarth of The Canberra Times felt that the album "will go some way to shifting that 'indie pop' label the band has been carrying. With Anna's emotionally taut vocal, agreeable harmonies, and their classy songwriting, it's hard to imagine too much going wrong." It provided two singles, "Beauty + Danger" and "I Lied".

The band underwent line-up changes with Larsen replaced on drums in 1993 by Dave Folley (ex-the Somerfields); Hohnen was replaced by David Nelson on bass guitar and Schwerkolt left in 1995. Early in that year Gary Aspinall joined on guitar, mandolin and organ (ex-Odolites, the Somerfields).

=== 1997-2001: Sun Bright Deep & Killjoys Retrospective ===
In November 1997, The Killjoys released a single, "Save Me", ahead of their third album, Sun Bright Deep which was released in March 1998. The album was co-produced by the group and Victor Van Vugt. At the ARIA Music Awards of 1998 the album was nominated for the ARIA Award for Best Adult Contemporary Album. Ed Nimmervoll caught their performance in February 1999 and he described how "Standing barefoot in the centre of the Killjoys spotlight is Anna Burley, the embodiment of the Killjoys music, eyes closed, arms outstretched and emphasising the emotion in the music as she sings songs about relationships and human frailty in the purest of voices. Anna's singing better than ever, the Killjoys are as good if not better than ever."

In 2001, a compilation album, Killjoys Retrospective was released.

=== 2006-present: Stealing Horses & Pearl ===
In 2006 the Killjoys released an album, Stealing Horses, the group's first in seven years. They released their fifth studio album, Pearl, in 2011. It is considered somewhat of a sequel to the band's iconic Ruby album, which was remastered and re-released alongside Pearl.

== Members ==
- Anna Burley – vocals, guitar (1988–2001)
- Jeremy Craigie-Smith – bass guitar (1988–90)
- Will Larsen – drums (1988–93)
- Craig Pilkington – guitar, trumpet, harmonium (1988–2001)
- Caroline Schwerkolt – vibraphone, keyboards (1988–95)
- Daniel Palamara – bass guitar (1990–91)
- Michael Hohnen – bass guitar (1991–95)
- David Folley – drums, percussion (1993–)
- Gary Aspinall – guitar, mandolin, organ (1995–2001)
- David Nelson – bass guitar, backing vocals (1995–2001)

== Discography ==
=== Studio albums ===
List of albums, with selected chart positions
Title	Album details	Peak chart positions
Title	Album details	AUS
Ruby	Released: October 1990; Label: Audrey Records (AUD003); Format: CD, LP	144
A Million Suns	Released: March 1993; Label: Mushroom Records (D30930); Format: CD	—
Sun Bright Deep	Released: March 1998; Label: Mushroom Records (D31837); Format: CD	—
Stealing Horses	Released: 2006; Label: Audrey Records (AUD017); Format: CD	—
Pearl	Released: 2011; Label: Popboomerang Records (PB073); Format: CD, Digital	—

=== Compilation albums ===
List of compilation album with selected details
Title	Details
Port Fairy Compilation	Released: 2001; Label: Audrey Records (AUD006); Format: CD
Acoustic Bootleg	Released: 2001; Label: Audrey Records (AUD007); Format: CD
Killjoys Retrospective	Released: 2001; Label: Audrey Records (AUD008) / Mushroom Records (MUSH4CD); Format: CD

=== Extended plays ===
List of EPs, with selected chart positions
Title	EP details	Peak chart positions
Title	EP details	AUS
Audrey	Released: February 1989; Label: Audrey Records (AUD001); Format: 12" Vinyl	—
Spin	Released: November 1991; Label: MXL Music/Mushroom(D 11063); Format: CD	136
The Optigan e.p	Released: December 2011; Label: Popboomerang Records; Format: Digital	—

=== Singles ===
Year	Title	Album
1989	"Fall Around Me"	Ruby
1991	"Michael Told Me"	Ruby
1991	"Calling Me On"	Spin
1993	"Beauty + Danger"	A Million Suns
1993	"I Lied"	A Million Suns
1994	"Love and Uncertainty"	A Million Suns (re-issue)
1995	"Come Around"	
1996	"Stupid Waste"	
1997	"Save Me"	Sun Bright Deep
1998	"The Better It Gets"	Sun Bright Deep
2002	"On the Radio"	
2003	"Letting You Go"	
2011	"My Old Guitar" (featuring Charles Jenkins)	Pearl

=== Other releases ===
- "I'll Never Find Another You" on Used and Recovered by Various Artists (1990)
- "Flame Trees" on Earth Music by Various Artists (June 1994) Mushroom Records/Festival Records
- Port Fairy Compilation (2000, released for the Port Fairy Folk Festival)
- Acoustic Bootleg: 15 Cover Songs (2000; cassette version released in 1995)
- Threnody (2002; Anna Burley [aka Red Lantern] solo record)

== Awards ==
=== ARIA Music Awards ===
The ARIA Music Awards is an annual awards ceremony that recognises excellence, innovation, and achievement across all genres of Australian music. The Killjoys won 1 award from 2 nominations.

Year	Nominee / work	Award	Result	Ref.
1991	Ruby	Best Independent Release	Won	
1998	Sun Bright Deep	Best Adult Contemporary Album	Nominated	
