= Electric Mary =

Australian rock band

- Origin: Melbourne, Victoria, Australia
- Genres: Classic rock, blues rock, rock, stoner rock
- Years active: 2003–2025
- Labels: Dinner For Wolves, MGM, Powerage, Bad Reputation, Big, Listenable
- Members: Rusty Brown; Pete Robinson; Alex Raunjak; Brett Wood
- Past members: Paul "Spyda" Marrett; Andy McIvor; Fox Fagan; Irwin Thomas; Patch Brown; Nathan Cavaleri; Glenn Proudfoot; Stephen (Venom) Brown; Davey Porter
- Website: www.electricmary.com

Electric Mary were an Australian hard rock and classic rock band from Melbourne. Their debut single "Sail On" reached #76 on the ARIA Singles chart.

== History ==
The band formed in 2003 and named themselves after Rusty Brown met Mary Culum Campbell, the manager of Jimi Hendrix's Electric Lady Studios in New York City. In 2008 they were finalists at the MusicOz Awards, nominated for Best Rock Band. They were also selected to support Whitesnake and Judas Priest. 2009 saw them tour with Alice Cooper and Glenn Hughes, as well as showcasing at Experience PRS for PRS Guitars in Stevensville, Maryland alongside the likes of Carlos Santana, Dweezil Zappa and Buddy Guy. In 2010 they supported Deep Purple. Whilst in the States, Electric Mary collaborated with engineer/producer Jason Corsaro on a live recording.

The latter part of 2010 saw the band perform at the World Cup in South Africa and then embark on an extensive concert tour of mainland Europe including Hell Fest in France.

In 2012 the band returned to Europe for an extensive tour taking in France, Spain and Belgium and then over to the UK and then went on to perform at the Hard Rock Hell Festival in Wales. The same year, the band's drummer Stephen (Venom) Brown decided to leave and was replaced by Davey Porter, who Rusty had played with on and off for the previous 20 years.

In 2014 the band released the EP The Last Great Hope and embarked on a European tour, selling out shows in Spain and France. Upon returning home, Davey fell from a roof and broke his ankle, which kept the band off the road for more than a year.

In 2016 the band discovered the lost tapes of Hell Dorado from the previous tour, it was a revelation and they quickly snapped up the services of The Machine to mix the album. The band were hellbent on using The Machine after falling in love with his work on records by the band Clutch.

A tour of Europe in October 2016 started the Straight Out of Hell Dorado tour. At the end of the 2016 Straight Out of Hell Dorado tour, Davey decided to depart from the band and after extensive searching Paul (Spyda) Marrett was signed up for drumming duties.

In 2017 the band started writing for the next album and by the end of 2017 recording had begun. The album, Mother, was released in February 2019.

2021 sees the latest single released "The King Of Rock'n'Roll" the first Production of Rusty's company www.beinsidethecircle 2022 electric Mary released the single "3 Days Gone" produced by Alex Raunjak who also made the video clip https://m.youtube.com/watch?v=Ha437abv0qY

On 24 November 2024, the band embarked on a farewell tour, with dates in Australia and Europe throughout 2025. The tour ended on 13 December 2025 at the Croxton Bandroom in the Melbourne suburb of Thornbury. The final song the band played was "My Best Friend".

== Discography ==
=== Albums ===
List of albums, with selected details
Title	Details
Four Hands High	Released: August 2004; Format: CD; Label: Big (BIGCD002)
Down to the Bone	Released: 2008; Format: CD, Digital, LP; Label: Powerage (PAGE006CD)
III	Released: 2011; Format: CD, Digital, LP; Label: Listenable Records (POSH163)
Alive in Hell Dorado	Released: 2016; Format: Digital; Label: Electric Mary (EMWW05); Note: Recorded live in November 2014
Mother	Released: 2019; Format: CD, Digital, LP; Label: Listenable Records (POSH408)

=== EPs ===
- The Definition of Insanity (2006)
- The Venom Principle (2008)
- Long Time Coming (2011)
- From the Vault (2012)
- The Last Great Hope (2014)

=== Singles ===
List of singles, with selected chart positions
Title	Year	Peak chart positions	Album
Title	Year	AUS	Album
"Sail On"	2004	76	Four Hands High
"Woman"	2017	—	Non-album singles
"It's Alright"	2019	—	Non-album singles
"The King of Rock'n'Roll"			Non-album singles
"3 Days Gone"	2022	—	
