= Girl Overboard (band) =

Australian pop rock band

- Also known as: Separate Tables (founded as)
- Origin: Melbourne, Victoria, Australia
- Genres: Pop rock Described by musicologist Ian McFarlane as a mix of dance pop, light jazz, American-style hard rock
- Years active: 1985–1993
- Label: RCA/BMG records
- Past members: see Members list below

Girl Overboard were a pop rock band formed in 1985 as Separate Tables by Lisa Schouw (a contralto) on lead vocals, Robin Gist on guitar, and Brett McNaughton on keyboards; with an expanded line-up, they changed their name. Girl Overboard released two albums: Paint a Picture (March 1990) and Go in 1993. The group split up in late 1993.

== History ==
=== 1983-1988: Founding ===
In 1983, future member of Girl Overboard, Lisa Schouw (born 5 March 1958 – 2 October 2020) joined as a vocalist for a Melbourne band, Pointz, where she worked alongside Robin Gist on guitar. Over two years they changed their name to Short Story, played around the town, and started negotiating a publishing and recording deal with Wheatley Records. However, the band fell apart before being signed. Schouw returned to New Zealand for six months, and returned to Australia to meet Gist and write songs. After auditioning various players they settled on keyboard player, Brett McNaughton, and together the three formed Separate Tables in 1985, initially using a drum machine.

Separate Tables' line-up was augmented by Lee Davidson on drums, Dean Hilson on saxophone and Jenny Milroy on backing vocals and percussion. They released an independent single, "Long Dark Night" backed with "Wrap Your Arms Around Me". After a year the band secured a recording deal with RCA/BMG and were a support act for John Farnham's Jack's Back Tour. They had a management contract with the Neil Clugston Organisation. Separate Tables promoted their single, "When the Word Came Down" (February 1988), by playing entertainment centres, concert halls and pubs around Australia. Their next single "Change My Sex" (May 1988) was largely ignored by radio. John Favaro joined on bass guitar and another single, "Wrap Your Arms Around Me" (February 1989), was released. They performed music for the soundtrack to the 1988 film Hungry Heart in which Schouw also costarred.

=== 1989-1992: Paint a Picture ===
The band began recording their debut album, Paint a Picture, with producer Ross Fraser at Metropolis Studios in Melbourne. At the ARIA Music Awards of 1989 Fraser won Producer of the Year for his work on "When the Word Came Down" by Separate Tables, Farnham's Age of Reason and the State's "Real Love". At the same ceremony Doug Brady won Engineer of the Year for his work on "Change My Sex" and "When the Word Came Down" by Separate Tables and additional works for other artists.

The name changed to Girl Overboard with the release of the next single, "I Can't Believe" (October 1989). Schouw explained to The Canberra Times' Kathryn Whitfield, why they changed, "We were playing pubs and were making a lot more noise and the name didn't describe the band, we are more emotional more energetic than that, so we became Girl Overboard." Whitfield observed, "Schouw, Gist and McNaughton have worked together on all the band's songs and though they all lean personally toward different musical styles they seem to reach perfect accord on the band's style." "I Can't Believe" was nominated for Breakthrough Artist – Single at ARIA Music Awards of 1990. A subsequent single, "The Love We Make" (January 1990), peaked at No. 23 on the ARIA Singles Chart. They toured Australia to promote Paint a Picture, which reached No. 18 on the ARIA Albums Chart. According to Australian musicologist, Ian McFarlane, "[their] sound was a safe mix of dance pop, light jazz and American-styled hard rock." They followed with a trip to United States and United Kingdom in 1991 to write new material, and "meet with song publishers and our record company." Fraser won another ARIA Award for his production work for Girl Overboard (and other artists) in 1991.

=== 1993: Go and break up ===
The band's second album, Go (1993), was recorded with producer, Charles Fisher, who provided an overall sense of cohesion while new drummer, Tony Day, had replaced Davidson. It provided the singles, "Chain of Fools", "Your Love", and "Jackie". Go and its singles were less successful on the charts and some band members became disillusioned. McFarlane felt, "[they] offered lushly textured pop with Schouw's rich contralto well to the fore." The band broke up late in 1993.

=== Death ===
Lead vocalist Schouw died from cancer on 2 October 2020, aged 62 and was honoured at the ARIA awards

== Members ==
- Lisa Schouw – vocals (d. 2020)
- Robin Gist – guitar
- Brett McNaughton – keyboards
- Lee Davidson – drums (album: Paint a Picture), Tony Day (Album Go)
- Jenny Milroy – backing vocals, percussion
- John Favaro – bass guitar
- Tony Day – drums
- John Farnham On Some Things Never Change

== Discography ==
=== Studio albums ===
List of albums, with selected chart positions and certifications
Title	Album details	Peak chart positions
Title	Album details	AUS
Paint a Picture	Released: 5 March 1990; Format: LP; Label: RCA/BMG	18
Go	Released: 8 March 1993; Format: LP; Label: RCA/BMG	91

=== Singles ===
Year	Single	Album	Chart positions
Year	Single	Album	AUS
1987	"Wrap Your Arms Around Me" / "Long Dark Night" (by Separate Tables)	non-album single	—
1987	"When the Word Came Down" (by Separate Tables)	non-album single	82
1988	"Change My Sex" (by Separate Tables)	non-album single	—
1989	"Wrap Your Arms Around Me" (re-recording) (by Separate Tables)	Paint a Picture	71
1989	"I Can't Believe"	Paint a Picture	43
1990	"The Love We Make"	Paint a Picture	23
1990	"Permanent Friend" / "Some Things Never Change"	Paint a Picture	85
1990	"In the Evening"	Paint a Picture	130
1991	"Who'll Stop the Rain"	non-album single	59
1992	"Your Love"	Go	70
1992	"Chain of Fools"	Go	138
1993	"Jackie"	Go	72
1993	"If You're Going to Leave Tonight"	Go	218

=== Music Videos ===
List of music videos, showing year released and directors
Year	Title	Album	Director
1987	"Long Dark Night" (as Separate Tables)	non-album video	Luigi Acquisto
1987	"Blue Falls the Rain" (as Separate Tables)	unreleased single and video	Luigi Acquisto
1987	"When the Word Came Down" (as Separate Tables)	non-album video	Luigi Acquisto
1989	"Wrap Your Arms Around Me" (as Separate Tables)	Paint A Picture	unknown
1989	"I Can't Believe"	Paint A Picture	unknown
1989	"I Can't Believe" (alternate version)	Paint A Picture	unknown
1990	"The Love We Make"	Paint A Picture	Maurice Todman
1990	"Permanent Friend"	Paint A Picture	Kriv Stenders
1990	"Some Things Never Change"	Paint A Picture	Jane Cole
1990	"In The Evening"	Paint A Picture	Kriv Stenders
1990	"In The Evening" (alternate version)	Paint A Picture	Kriv Stenders
1991	"I Can't Believe" (US version)	non-album videos	Grant Matthews
1991	"Who'll Stop The Rain"	non-album videos	Grant Matthews
1992	"Your Love"	Go	Paul Elliott and Sally Bongers
1992	"Chain Of Fools"	Go	Paul Elliott and Sally Bongers
1993	"Jackie"	Go	Paul Elliott

== Awards and nominations ==
=== ARIA Music Awards ===
The ARIA Music Awards is an annual awards ceremony that recognises excellence, innovation, and achievement across all genres of Australian music. They commenced in 1987.

Year	Nominee / work	Award	Result	Ref.
1990	"I Can't Believe"	Breakthrough Artist - Single	Nominated	
1990	Doug Brady for "I Can't Believe" by Girl Overboard	Engineer of the Year	Nominated	
1991	"Permanent Friend"	Best Video	Nominated	
1991	Ross Fraser for "The Love We Make" by Girl Overboard	Producer of the Year	Won	
