= Hartley Newnham =

Australian countertenor

Hartley Newnham is an Australian countertenor. Along with Nicholas Routley he was nominated for the 1991 ARIA Award for Best Classical Album for their album Hermit of Green Light.

Newnham was born in Queensland and studied music in Paris and London. He is a member of La Romanesca and Les Six.

== Awards and nominations ==
=== ARIA Music Awards ===
The ARIA Music Awards is an annual awards ceremony that recognises excellence, innovation, and achievement across all genres of Australian music. They commenced in 1987.

Year	Nominee / work	Award	Result	Ref.
1991	Hermit of Green Light (with Nicholas Routley)	Best Classical Album	Nominated	
