= DAAS Icon =

Studio album by Doug Anthony All Stars
- Released: 14 May 1990
- Recorded: 1989, Studio RBX, Melbourne
- Genre: Alternative rock
- Length: 43:00
- Label: CBS/DAAS Kapital
- Producer: Ross Cockle

Doug Anthony All Stars chronology
Let It Swing (1986)	DAAS Icon (1990)	Dead & Alive (1993)

DAAS Icon (also known as Icon) is the first and only studio album recorded and released by Australian comedy trio, the Doug Anthony All Stars. Released in 1990, it features the singles "I Want to Spill the Blood of a Hippy" and "Bottle". Icon went on to become the highest-selling independent album in Australia, but was banned in the UK due to a reference to the IRA in the song "KRSNA". This was later overturned by a British court.

At the ARIA Music Awards of 1991, the album was nominated for Best New Talent and Best Comedy Release.

Early versions of "Little Gospel Song" and "Change the Blades" previously appeared on their demo tape Let It Swing in 1986. "Shang-a-lang" samples part of the drum intro from the Beastie Boys' "She's Crafty".

== Track listing ==
All tracks capitalised as on the back cover (for CD) and inner sleeve (for LP).

All lyrics are written by Paul McDermott; all music is composed by Doug Anthony All Stars.

Side A
No.	Title	Length
1.	"Commies for Christ"	3:02
2.	"My Babys gone to Jail"	2:29
3.	"JACK"	1:57
4.	"Change the Blades"	3:14
5.	"KRS̈NA"	2:50
6.	"Shang-a-lang"	2:54
7.	"Little Gospel Song"	1:40
8.	"DEAD ELVIS"	2:45
Total length:		20:50

Side B
No.	Title	Length
9.	"i want to spill the blood of a Hippy"	4:54
10.	"Go to Church"	3:06
11.	"RAT"	3:12
12.	"Broad lic Nic"	3:10
13.	"2x"	2:13
14.	"Motorcycle St. Sebastian"	3:05
15.	"BOTTLE"	2:33
Total length:		22:13

== Personnel ==
- Produced by DAAS and The Cockle Factor
- Engineered by Ross Cockle and Melita Jagic
- All songs by Control
- Richard Fidler – guitars, sitar, Irish harp, axe and dinner plates, backing and harmony vocals
- Paul McDermott – lead vocals (tracks 1–5, 7, 8, 12, 14, 15), kettle drum, erhu, viola, sheet metals and cymbals, harmony vocals
- Tim Ferguson – lead vocals (tracks 6 and 9), keyboards, Fairlight, euphonium, kora, bachelors rags, backing and harmony vocals
- Andrew – brass
- Steve Hadley – double bass
- Rosie Westbrook – electric bass, double bass
- Angus Burchell, J.J. Hackett – drums
- Sam See – drum programmer
- Kerri Simpson – vocals
- Richard Lewis – artwork

== Charts ==
Chart (1990)	Peak position
Australian (ARIA Charts)	42
