= Low Key (album) =

Studio album by Regine Velasquez
- Released: November 14, 2008
- Recorded: 2008
- Genre: Easy listening; pop
- Length: 73:04
- Label: Universal Records
- Producer: Regine Velasquez-Alcasid (executive); Kathleen Dy-Go (executive); Ito Rapadas (line producer)

Regine Velasquez chronology
Covers, Vol. 2 (2006)	Low Key (2008)	Fantasy (2010)

Alternative covers
- Asian release

Alternative covers
- Re-release Package

Singles from Low Key
- 1. "Tell Me That You Love Me" Released: November 2008; 2. "No Walls, No Ceilings, No Floors" Released: December 2008; 3. "And I Love You So" Released: February 2009

Professional ratings
Review scores
Source	Rating
Philippine Daily Inquirer Music	5/5 stars
iTunes Ratings	4.5/5 stars

Low Key is the fourteenth studio album, and fifth cover album, by Filipina singer-actress Regine Velasquez-Alcasid, released on November 14, 2008 in physical format (cassette & CDs) and digital. The album was Velasquez's first album with Universal Records. It was certified gold a week after its release with sales of over 12,500 units on its first day and achieves platinum certification after a month. It became one of the best selling albums for year 2008–2009.

The album also includes a minus-one CD of all the tracks. An Asian edition of the album was released on December 16, 2008, and a Philippine re-release which feature a Christmas song bonus track original by Jim Brickman with a different cover album art. The album cover art is taken by Filipino photographer Mark Nicdao at Velasquez's home.

== Background ==
The song choices for the album were chosen by Velasquez herself together with her sisters, Cacai & Dianne from the list of their favorite songs heard on the radio during their childhood. According to Velasquez, she wanted the album to be easy listening and relaxed as possible, making it a departure from her “big ballads” usually heard in her previous works. As a result, the album was named Low Key, a remark on her mellow singing style in the whole process of its production. The songs included are very personal to Velasquez and also dedicated to her fans. There are also two songs included on the album that are dedicated to Velasquez's parents, Gerry and Tessie Velasquez; Dan Fogelberg's "Leader of the Band" for her father and Billy Joel's "She's Always a Woman" for her mother.

== Awards ==
Low Key won at the first Star Awards for Music for Female Recording Of The Year, Female Pop Artist Of The Year, Music Video Of The Year for "And I Love You So", Revival Album Of The Year and Album Cover Design. The album won Female Recording Of The Year and Revival Album Of The Year on October 29, 2009, at SM Skydome. It was also nominated at the 22nd Awit Awards for Best Selling Album Of The Year and Best Album Package.

== Track listing ==
No.	Title	Writer(s)	Original Artist(s)	Length
1.	"Tell Me That You Love Me"	Terri Gibbs	Steve Gibb	04:22
2.	"And I Love You So"	Don McLean	Don McLean	04:28
3.	"I'd Rather Leave While I'm In Love"	Carole Bayer Sager, Peter Allen	Carole Bayer Sager	04:03
4.	"I Never Dreamed Someone Like You Could Love Someone Like Me"	Katie Irving	Katie Irving	03:32
5.	"No Walls, No Ceilings, No Floors"	Hal David, Archie Jordan	Barbara Mandrell	03:42
6.	"Good Friend"	Elmer Bernstein, Norman Gimble	Mary MacGregor	03:25
7.	"How Can I Tell You"	Cat Stevens	Cat Stevens	02:57
8.	"Of All the Things"	Dennis Lambert, Brian Potter	Dennis Lambert	03:33
9.	"Longer"	Dan Fogelberg	Dan Fogelberg	03:38
10.	"At Seventeen"	Janis Ian	Janis Ian	04:44
11.	"She's Always a Woman"	Billy Joel	Billy Joel	05:16
12.	"Never Be the Same"	Christopher Cross	Christopher Cross	03:50
13.	"Strawberry Fields Forever"	John Lennon, Paul McCartney	The Beatles	04:23
14.	"Weeping Willows, Cattails"	Gordon Lightfoot	Jane Olivor	04:10
15.	"Leader Of The Band"	Dan Fogelberg	Dan Fogelberg	04:40
16.	"Walk In Love"	David Batteau, John Klemmer	David Batteau	03:46
17.	"Clouds Across the Moon"	Richard Hewson	The RAH Band	04:40
18.	"Christmas Is" (bonus track)	Jim Brickman, Reggie Hamm, Mark Quinn Harris	Jim Brickman	03:51

== Credits ==
Personnel

- Kathleen Dy-Go – executive producer
- Regine Velasquez-Alcasid – executive producer
- Ito Rapadas – line producer
- Jay Saturnino D. Lumboy – graphic designer, album concept
- Mark Nicdao – photography

Production

- Homer Flores – arranger (tracks 1 & 3)
- Jimmy Antiporda – arranger (track 2)
- Bobby Velasco – arranger (tracks 4 & 17)
- Bond Samson – arranger (tracks 5 & 9)
- Niño Regalado – arranger (tracks 6 & 16)
- Fred Garcia – arranger (tracks 7, 12 & 14)
- Noel Mendez – arranger (tracks 8, & 11)
- Raul Mitra – arranger (track 10)
- Ito Rapadas – arranger (track 18)
- Jay Durias – background vocals, arranger (track 15)
- Jim Brickman – background vocals, piano (track 18)
- Noel Mendez – guitars (tracks 8 &11)
- Janno Queyquep – guitars (tracks 2, 3, 4, 5, 6, 7, 10, 12, 14, 15, 16, 17 &18)
- Cezar Aguas – guitars (tracks 9 &13), arranger (track 13)

== See also ==
- Regine Velasquez discography
- List of best-selling albums in the Philippines
