= Jason Vorherr =

- Born: Jason Heath Vorherr
- Origin: Melbourne, Victoria
- Genres: Pop, Blues
- Occupation: Musician
- Instruments: Guitar, bass
- Years active: 1997–present
- Website: jasonvorherrmusic.com.au

Jason Heath Vorherr is an Australian guitarist, singer and songwriter. He is currently the bassist for the Daryl Braithwaite touring band.

== Career ==
Jason Vorherr started playing in cover bands as a bass guitarist and as a solo act in the late 1980s. His career as a backing musician began after Graeham Goble asked him to join the original members of Little River Band, Birtles Shorrock Goble on their comeback tour. He played bass guitar and performed backing vocals on their gold-award winning album and DVD Full Circle.

In addition to working with Daryl Braithwaite, he has worked with Glenn Shorrock, Brian Cadd, and The Fabulous Caprettos. He is also a resident producer and musician at Soggy Dog Recording Studio.

In 2022, Vorherr released the album Living in the Suburbs, drawn from his personal experiences growing up in the suburbs of Melbourne. The Australian Musician magazine awarded him "Musician of the Month" in August of that year.

== Personal life ==
Vorherr grew up in Scoresby, Victoria and attended Scoresby High School. He lives in Upwey, Victoria with his wife and daughter.

== Selected videos ==
- In The Sun - Jason Vorherr, 12 April 2020
- Sweetest Music - Jason Vorherr, 20 May 2020
- Birtles Shorrock Goble - Days On The Road (The Forum) October 2003, bass intro by Jason Vorherr, 10 June 2014
