= Foolish Lullaby =

Single by Laura Branigan

"Foolish Lullaby" is a song by Laura Branigan from her fourth studio album, Hold Me (1985). Written by Jack White and Mark Spiro and produced by White, the track was later reworked by Paul Anka under the title "It's Hard to Say Goodbye".

== Paul Anka versions ==
=== Paul Anka 1993 versions ===
In 1993, Paul Anka rewrote "Foolish Lullaby" and recorded it as "It's Hard to Say Goodbye". Produced by C+C Music Factory, the song appeared on his album Face in the Mirror. Anka also recorded a duet version with Filipino singer Regine Velasquez for the Asian edition of Face in the Mirror and for Velasquez's 1993 album Reason Enough.

=== Paul Anka and Celine Dion versions ===
"It's Hard to Say Goodbye"

Promotional single by Paul Anka and Celine Dion

from the album A Body of Work
- Released: January 1999
- Recorded: 1998
- Genre: Pop
- Length: 4:31
- Label: Epic
- Songwriters: Paul Anka; Mark Spiro; Jack White
- Producers: David Foster; Humberto Gatica

Audio
- "It's Hard to Say Goodbye" on YouTube

In 1996, Anka and Celine Dion recorded a bilingual version of "It's Hard to Say Goodbye", with Dion singing in Spanish and Anka in English. The Spanish lyrics were written by Adrian Posse and Humberto Gatica, and the track was produced by David Foster. Titled "Mejor Decir Adiós", it appeared on Anka's album Amigos, released on July 30, 1996.

In 1998, Anka and Dion recorded an English‑language duet version of "It's Hard to Say Goodbye". Produced by Foster and Gatica, it was included on Anka's album A Body of Work, issued on September 22, 1998. The song was released as a promotional single to US adult contemporary radio in January 1999. The single included a shortened radio edit running four minutes and sixteen seconds.

==== Critical reception ====
Chuck Taylor of Billboard praised the duet and compared it to Barbra Streisand and Neil Diamond's "You Don't Bring Me Flowers".

==== Commercial performance ====
In March 1999, Fred Bronson of Billboard noted that Dion might soon have three duets on the Adult Contemporary chart, as she was already charting with "I'm Your Angel" and "The Prayer". Although "It's Hard to Say Goodbye" did not enter the Billboard Adult Contemporary top 25, it reached number 26 on the Radio & Records Adult Contemporary top 30 chart.

==== Charts ====
Chart performance
Chart (1999)	Peak position
US Adult Contemporary (Radio & Records)	26
