= Heart in Danger =

1990 single by Southern Sons

- Australian CD single

Single by Southern Sons

from the album Southern Sons
- B-side: "Out of My Hands"
- Released: 23 July 1990
- Studio: Metropolis (Melbourne, Australia)
- Length: 4:59
- Label: RCA
- Songwriter(s): Phil Buckle
- Producer(s): Ross Fraser

Southern Sons singles chronology
"Heart in Danger" (1990)	"Always and Ever" (1990)

"Heart in Danger" is a song by Australian pop-rock band Southern Sons, released as the debut single in July 1990. It was written by the group's guitarist, Phil Buckle, and produced by Ross Fraser. The song peaked at number five in Australia and was included on their debut album, Southern Sons (1990).

== Background ==
Southern Sons were established in 1989 by all four members of the group the State, Peter Bowman on guitars and vocals, Phil Buckle on vocals and guitar, Geoff Cain on bass guitar and Virgil Donati on drums, which were joined by guitarist and vocalist Irwin Thomas (p.k.a. Jack Jones).

In August 1990, Southern Sons released their debut single "Heart in Danger", which peaked at number five on the ARIA Singles Chart. It was written by Buckle and produced by Ross Fraser. It was followed by the single, "Always and Ever" (November) and the group's debut self-titled album, Southern Sons (February 1991), which peaked at number five on the ARIA albums chart.

Southern Sons were criticised for sounding too similar to label-mate John Farnham; they "had to defend their sound, their image, their music but now say they're just happy doing what they do in their own time and way." Buckle "believes that despite the fact he writes music for both groups... the Sons guitar work makes for a harder sound." According to Victor Harbor Times' reviewer the album is a "mature and stylish collection of emotionally charged and musically impeccable pop/rock songs."

== Track listings ==
7-inch and cassette single
No.	Title	Writer(s)	Length
1.	"Heart in Danger"	Phil Buckle	4:48
2.	"Out of My Hands"	Virgil Donati, Buckle, Peter Bowman, Geoff Cain	4:20

European CD single
No.	Title	Writer(s)	Length
1.	"Heart in Danger"	Buckle	4:48
2.	"Out of My Hands"	Donati, Buckle, Bowman, Cain	4:20
3.	"More Than Enough"	Bowman, Buckle	3:40

== Charts ==
=== Weekly charts ===
Chart (1990)	Peak position
Australia (ARIA)	5

=== Year-end charts ===
Chart (1990)	Position
Australia (ARIA)	56

== Sales and certifications ==
Region	Certification	Certified units/sales
Australia (ARIA)	Gold	35,000^{^}
^{^} Shipments figures based on certification alone.
