= Southern Sons (album) =

Studio album by Southern Sons
- Released: 1 June 1990
- Recorded: 1989–90
- Genre: Pop rock, soft rock
- Length: 42:31
- Label: Wheatley Records
- Producer: Ross Fraser

Southern Sons chronology
Southern Sons (1990)	Train Tracks (1991)

Singles from Southern Sons
- 1. "Heart in Danger" Released: July 1990; 2. "Always And Ever" Released: November 1990; 3. "Hold Me in Your Arms" Released: March 1991; 4. "The World Is Mine" Released: 1991

Southern Sons is the self-titled debut album by Australian band Southern Sons. The album was released in Australia through Wheatley Records (best known as John Farnham's label) in June 1990 and reached number 5 on the ARIA charts. A total of 4 singles were released from the album.

At the ARIA Music Awards of 1991, the album was nominated for Breakthrough Artist – Album, but lost to Safety in Numbers by Margaret Urlich.

The album was re-released in 2009 by Sony BMG and was also released in the Australian iTunes Store as a digital download in 2010.

== Track listing ==
1. "Always And Ever" (P. Buckle) – 3:58
2. "Which Way" (P. Buckle) – 3:56
3. "Living This Way" (P. Bowman, P. Buckle) – 3:05
4. "Heart in Danger" (P. Buckle) – 4:58
5. "Hold Me in Your Arms" (P. Buckle) – 4:05
6. "Something More" (P. Buckle) – 3:40
7. "Waiting For That Train" (P. Buckle, P. Bowman) – 3:43
8. "More Than Enough" (P. Bowman, P. Buckle) – 3:41
9. "Hold On To The Memory" (P. Buckle, V. Donati) – 4:12
10. "The World Is Mine" (P. Buckle) – 3:47
11. "What I See" (P. Buckle, P. Bowman) – 3:33

== Personnel ==
- Jack Jones – lead vocals, guitars
- Phil Buckle – guitars, backing vocals
- Virgil Donati – drums, keyboards
- Geoff Cain – bass
- Peter Bowman – guitars, backing vocals

Guest artist

- David Hirschfelder – keyboards on "Always And Ever"

== Chart positions ==
=== Weekly charts ===
Chart (1990/91)	Peak position
Australian Albums (ARIA)	5

=== Year-End charts ===
Chart (1991)	Position
Australian Albums Chart	22
Australian Artist Albums Chart	5

=== Certifications ===
Region	Certification	Certified units/sales
Australia (ARIA)	2× Platinum	140,000^{^}
^{^} Shipments figures based on certification alone.
