= Reason Enough =

Studio album by Regine Velasquez
- Released: 1993
- Genre: Pop, OPM
- Language: Tagalog, English
- Label: PolyCosmic Records
- Producer: Chito Ilagan (producer); Ronnie Henares (producer); Gino Cruz (assistant producer); Mon Faustino (assistant producer)

Regine Velasquez chronology
Tagala Talaga (1991)	Reason Enough (1993)	Listen Without Prejudice (1994)

Singles from Reason Enough
- 1. "It's Hard to Say Goodbye the" Released: July 1993; 2. "Reason Enough" Released: July 1993

Reason Enough is the fourth album by Filipino singer-actress Regine Velasquez , released in 1993 under PolyCosmic Records and distributed by MCA Universal Inc. It was released on cassette, LP and CD. Her fourth album composed of Filipino composition by Vehnee Saturno, Janno Gibbs, Gary Valenciano , Trina Belamide and Kaniro Sakiya with two cover songs written by international singers Patti Austin and Paul Anka, whom Velasquez released a duet version of the song, Its Hard to Say Goodbye. The album was awarded double platinum in the Philippines.

== Background ==
In 1993, Velasquez released her fourth album, titled Reason Enough under PolyCosmic Records (known as UMG Philippines). The album contains 10 tracks.

=== Singles ===
Velasquez released her single, "Reason Enough", written by Trina Belamide, in July 1993. In the same month, the single, "It's Hard to Say Goodbye", a duet with Canadian-American singer Paul Anka, was released.

== Track listing ==
No.	Title	Writer(s)	Original artist(s)	Length
1.	"Is This Feeling for Real"	Rica Arambulo		4:40
2.	"Tonight"	Janno Gibbs		4:25
3.	"Kung Kailan Pa"	Babsie Molina; Edith Gallardo		3:20
4.	"Slip Away (duet with Gary Valenciano)"	Gino Cruz		5:58
5.	"Babalik Kang Muli"	Kanjiro Sakiya; Larry Chua		4:31
6.	"Sana Maulit Muli"	Gary Valenciano, Angeli Valenciano	Gary Valenciano	5:43
7.	"Reason Enough"	Trina Belamide		3:49
8.	"Say You Love Me"	Patti Austin	Patti Austin	3:50
9.	"Damdamin ko Sa Iyo"	Vehnee Saturno		4:13
10.	"It's Hard To Say Goodbye (duet with Paul Anka)"	Jack White, Mark Spiro, Paul Anka	Paul Anka and Celine Dion	4:22

== Personnel ==
Production

- Arrangers: Cezar Aguas, Rica Arambulo, Gino Cruz, Mon Faustino, Homer Flores, Alvin Nuñez, Gary Valenciano, Randy Waldman
- Engineered by Dindo Aldecoa, Nardz Corpuz, Willy Munji, Lito Palco, Monching Payumo, Jun Dela Paz, Dante San Pedro
- Produced by Chito Ilagan and Ronnie Henares
- Assistant producer – Bambi Santos
- Creative director – Ida Henares
- Director of photography – Raymond Isaac
- Digital remastering by Minith Splice Mota
- Recorded at JR Music Studio and Green Hills Sound Production

== Release history ==
Region	Release date	Label	Edition	Catalogue
Philippines	1993	PolyCosmic Records	Standard (LP and Cassette)	DST-92-222

== Certifications ==
Region	Certification	Certified units/sales
Philippines (PARI)	2× Platinum	80,000^{*}
^{*} Sales figures based on certification alone.
