= Silver Series: Movie Theme Songs =

Compilation album by Regine Velasquez
- Released: August 29, 2006
- Recorded: 1987–2003 (in the Philippines)
- Genre: Pop, OPM
- Length: 47:47
- Language: English, Tagalog
- Label: Viva Records
- Producer: Vincent Del Rosario Jr. (executive); Vincent Del Rosario (executive); Marivic Benedicto; Guia Gil Ferrer

Regine Velasquez chronology
Silver Series: Greatest Hits (2006)	Silver Series: Movie Theme Songs (2006)	Silver Series: Duets (2006)

Silver Series: Movie Theme Songs is the 9th compilation album by Filipino pop singer-actress Regine Velasquez-Alcasid released on August 8, 2006, and second among the Silver Series compilations. It was awarded by Philippine Association of the Record Industry as Platinum Status in the year 2008, denoting the shipments of 30,000+.

== Background ==
This album is a part of Velasquez's former label Viva Records 25th Silver Anniversary celebration, which they released their Silver Series project. The project is a compilation album of their past artists including Velasquez. This compilation consists of movie theme songs from Velasquez's own movies and the other movies that Velasquez only performed for a theme. Only Velasquez and Sharon Cuneta had released a silver series in 3 categories, Silver Series: Greatest Hits, Movie Theme Songs and Duets.

== Track listing ==
No.	Title	Writer(s)	Producer(s)	Length
1.	"Isang Lahi" (from the Movie Gabi Ka Na Kumander)	Vehnee Saturno	Vehnee Saturno	4:02
2.	"You Are My Song" (from the Movie Wanted Perfect Mother)	Louie Ocampo, Martin Nievera	Louie Ocampo	3:52
3.	"Pangarap Sa Aking Puso" (from the movie Wanted Perfect Mother)	Lisa Dy, Chat Zamora (courtesy of Harmony Music)	Rudy Lozano	3:09
4.	"Linlangin Mo" (from the movie Linlang)	Raul Mitra, Cacai Velasquez-Mitra	Mark Feist	4:46
5.	"Pangako" (from the Movie Pangako...Ikaw Lang)	Ogie Alcasid, Manilyn Reynes	Raul Mitra	4:33
6.	"Tanging Mahal" (from the movie Pangako...Ikaw Lang)	Girl Valencia	Regine Velasquez, Raul Mitra	4:04
7.	"Kailangan Ko'y Ikaw" (from the movie Kailangan Ko'y Ikaw)	Ogie Alcasid	Regine Velasquez, Raul Mitra	3:24
8.	"Hanggang Ngayon (with Ogie Alcasid)" (from the movie Ikaw Lamang Hanggang Ngayon)	Ogie Alcasid	Ogie Alcasid	4:32
9.	"Ikaw" (from the movie Dahil May Isang Ikaw)	George Canseco, Louie Ocampo	Mark Feist	3:20
10.	"Pangarap Ko Ang Ibigin Ka" (from the movie Pangarap Ko Ang Ibigin Ka)	Ogie Alcasid	Mon Faustino	5:21
11.	"Hinahanap-Hanap Kita" (from the movie Pangarap Ko Ang Ibigin Ka)	Rico Blanco	Nino Regalado	4:46
12.	"Sa Piling Mo" (from the Movie Captain Barbell)	Ogie Alcasid	Ogie Alcasid	3:50

== Release history ==
Country	Release date	Label
Philippines	August 29, 2006	Viva Records
