= Southern Sons =

Australian rock band

- Origin: Melbourne, Victoria, Australia
- Genres: Soft rock; pop rock
- Years active: 1989–1996, 2019–present
- Labels: Wheatley Records, RCA Records, Sony BMG
- Members: Jack Jones; Virgil Donati; Phil Buckle; Geoff Cain; Peter Bowman

Southern Sons is an Australian rock band, formed in Melbourne, Victoria in 1989 by members of The State along with lead vocalist and guitarist Irwin Thomas, who was then using the stage name Jack Jones. They are best known for their Australian top ten hits "Heart in Danger", "Hold Me in Your Arms", and "You Were There".

== Career ==
=== 1989–1991: Beginnings and Southern Sons ===
Southern Sons were established in 1989 and featured several members of the band The State, one such member guitarist Phil Buckle and Sons lead man Jack Jones in 1990 worked alongside John Farnham as session musicians on his album Chain Reaction, as well a accompanied Farnham on tour. The group signed a record deal with Farnham's manager Glenn Wheatley on his Wheatley Records label.

In July 1990, Southern Sons released their debut single "Heart in Danger", which peaked at number 5 on the ARIA Charts. In November 1990, the single "Always and Ever" was released as well as the group's debut self-titled album, Southern Sons peaked at number 5 on the ARIA albums chart. A third single, the ballad "Hold Me in Your Arms" was released in March 1991 and peaked at number 9.

=== 1992–1996: Nothing But the Truth and Zone ===
In August 1992, Southern Sons released "Lead Me to Water", the lead single from the group's second studio album. The song peaked at number 36. Nothing But the Truth, was released in November 1992 and came with the departure of guitarist Peter Bowman. The album's third single "You Were There" peaked at number 6 in May 1993. The Sydney Dance Company included three Southern Sons songs in its 1993 production of Beauty and the Beast.

Southern Sons' third and final studio album, Zone, was released in 1996. The album's lead single, "Don't Tell Me What's Right", featured vocals from Men at Work's Colin Hay. Soon after the album's release, Southern Sons disbanded.

=== 1996–2018: After Southern Sons ===
Jones was married to New Zealand-born Australian actress Rebecca Gibney from 1992–1995. The marriage ended in divorce. Jack Jones reverted to his birth name Irwin Thomas and has recorded under that name with several projects, including Mudhead and Electric Mary, while also joining John Farnham on multiple tours. In 1999 Jones played on the Tour of Duty – Concert for the Troops for peacekeeping Australian troops in Dili, East Timor.

=== 2019–present: Band re-formation ===
In 2019 the group re-formed after 22 years, for One Electric Day concert.

The group toured Australia in 2025 and again in 2026.

== Members ==
- Jack Jones – lead vocals, guitar
- Phil Buckle – guitar, vocals
- Peter Bowman – guitar, vocals
- Geoff Cain – bass
- Virgil Donati – drums, studio keyboards
- Pete Drummond - tour drums and vocals

== Discography ==
=== Studio albums ===
Title	Details	Peak chart positions	Certifications (sales thresholds)
Title	Details	AUS	Certifications (sales thresholds)
Southern Sons	Released: November 1990; Label: Wheatley, RCA, BMG; Formats: CD, vinyl, cassette	5	ARIA: 2× Platinum
Nothing But the Truth	Released: November 1992; Label: RCA, BMG; Formats: CD, cassette	26	
Zone	Released: August 1996; Label: RCA, BMG; Formats: CD, cassette	129	

=== Compilation albums ===
Title	Details
Truth	Released: 1993 (International release); Label: RCA, BMG

=== Extended plays ===
Title	Details	Peak chart positions
Title	Details	AUS
Train Tracks	Released: June 1991; Label: RCA, BMG; Formats: CD, cassette	40

=== Singles ===
Year	Single	Peak chart positions	Certifications (sales thresholds)	Album
Year	Single	AUS	Certifications (sales thresholds)	Album
1990	"Heart in Danger"	5	ARIA: Gold	Southern Sons
1990	"Always and Ever"	16		Southern Sons
1991	"Hold Me in Your Arms"	9		Southern Sons
1991	"The World Is Mine" (European release)	—N/a		Southern Sons
1992	"Lead Me to Water"	36		Nothing But the Truth
1992	"I Can't Wait Any Longer"	111		Nothing But the Truth
1993	"You Were There"	6	ARIA: Gold	Nothing But the Truth
1993	"Sometimes"	99		Nothing But the Truth
1993	"Silent Witnesses"	88		Nothing But the Truth
1996	"Don't Tell Me What's Right"	57		Zone
1996	"Trust in Me"	127		Zone

=== Video albums ===
Year	Album
1991	Southern Sons: The Video (VHS)

=== Music videos ===
Year	Song	Director
1990	"Heart in Danger"	Craig Griffin
1990	"Always and Ever"	Lance Reynolds
1990	"Hold Me in Your Arms"	Craig Griffin
1991	"Waiting for That Train"	Neil Stone, Robbie Blackburn
1992	"Lead Me to Water"	
1992	"You Were There"	
1995	"Trust in Me"	

=== Other appearances ===
Year	Song	Album
1993	"The Little Drummer Boy"	The Spirit of Christmas 1993
1995	"You Were There"	Music from Blue Heelers (Television soundtrack)

== Awards and nominations ==
=== APRA Awards ===
The APRA Awards are held in Australia and New Zealand by the Australasian Performing Right Association to recognise songwriting skills, sales and airplay performance by its members annually.

Year	Nominee / work	Award	Result
1991	"Heart in Danger" (Phil Buckle) by Southern Sons	Most Performed Australian Work	Won
1993	"You Were There" (Phil Buckle) by Southern Sons	Song of the Year	Nominated
1994	"You Were There" (Phil Buckle) by Southern Sons	Most Performed Australian Work	Nominated

=== ARIA Music Awards ===
The ARIA Music Awards is an annual awards ceremony that recognises excellence, innovation, and achievement across all genres of Australian music. They commenced in 1987. 1927 have won three awards.

Year	Nominee / work	Award	Result	Ref.
1991	"Heart in Danger"	Breakthrough Artist - Single	Nominated	
1991	Southern Sons	Breakthrough Artist - Album	Nominated	
1991	Ross Fraser for "Heart in Danger" by Southern Sons	Producer of the Year	Won	
1991	Doug Brady for "Always and Forever" and "Heart in Danger" by Southern Sons	Engineer of the Year	Nominated	
1992	"Hold Me in Your Arms"	Song of the Year	Nominated	
1992	Ross Fraser for "Hold Me in Your Arms" by Southern Sons	Producer of the Year	Nominated	
