= The State (band) =

Australian band

- Also known as: The Cutters
- Origin: Melbourne, Victoria, Australia
- Genres: Pop
- Years active: 1987–1989
- Labels: Wheatley Bros/BMG; RCA Victor
- Spinoffs: Southern Sons
- Past members: Peter Bowman; Phil Buckle; Geoff Cain; Virgil Donati

The State were an Australian band, which formed as The Cutters. Their second single, "Real Love" (October 1988), was nominated for the 1989 ARIA Award for Best New Talent. They released their debut album, Elementary, in February 1989. After that, all four members formed Southern Sons with Jack Jones late that year.

== History ==
The Cutters were formed in Melbourne by Peter Bowman on guitars and vocals (ex-Talk That Walk), Phil Buckle on vocals and guitar, and Geoff Cain on bass guitar. They were joined by Virgil Donati on drums (ex-Cloud Nine, Taste, Peter Cupples Band, the Cosy Connection) and changed their name to the State in 1987.

By 1988 the group were signed to Glenn Wheatley's label, Wheatley Bros Records, and released their debut single, "Responsible", in June. It was followed by "Real Love" in October. At the ARIA Music Awards of 1989 they were nominated for Best New Talent for "Real Love". They issued their debut album, Elementary, in February 1989.

The Age's Mike Daly observed, "[there] is some polished playing on [the album] but it is undermined by predictable material. The quartet... produce hi-tech pop dominated by Donati's hard-edged acoustic and synthesised rhythms. Buckle is an accomplished guitarist, a jazz fusion veteran like Donati, which gives this group more chops than most contemporary bands. The opener. 'Responsible', is catchy, while some flashy guitar is unleashed on 'Real Love' and 'One Step', with strong vocal back-up. But the songwriting is superficial and short on melodic hooks."

During 1989 the State supported the Eurythmics Australian tour. According to Australian musicologist, Ian McFarlane, "[their] future looked promising, but there was one vital ingredient required to make the push into the big time (i.e. a good frontman and songwriter)." The State members formed Southern Sons with American-born guitarist-vocalist, Jack Jones (a.k.a. Irwin Thomas), in 1989, who became their front man. Jones "had auditioned for the band previously but was considered too young."

== Band members ==
- Peter Bowman – guitar, vocals
- Phil Buckle – vocals, guitar
- Geoff Cain – bass guitar
- Virgil Donati – drums

== Discography ==
=== Albums ===
Title	Details
Elementary	Released: February 1989; Label: RCA Victor (VPCD0739); Format: Vinyl, CD

=== Singles ===
Year	Title	Album
1988	"Responsible"	Elementary
1988	"Real Love"	Elementary
1989	"So Lonely Now"	Elementary

== Awards and nominations ==
=== ARIA Music Awards ===
The ARIA Music Awards is an annual awards ceremony that recognises excellence, innovation, and achievement across all genres of Australian music. They commenced in 1987.

Year	Nominee / work	Award	Result	Ref.
1989	"Real Love"	Best New Talent	Nominated	
1989	Ross Fraser for "Real Love" by The State	Producer of the Year	Won	
1989	Doug Brady for "Real Love" & "So Lonely Now" by The State	Engineer of the Year	Won	
