= Lead Me to Water =

1992 single by Southern Sons

- Australian CD single

Single by Southern Sons

from the album Nothing but the Truth
- B-side: "Can't Breathe"
- Released: 31 August 1992
- Length: 4:44
- Label: RCA; BMG
- Songwriter(s): Phil Buckle
- Producer(s): Louie Shelton

Southern Sons singles chronology
| "The World Is Mine" (1991) | "Lead Me to Water" (1992) | "Sometimes" (1992) |

"Lead Me to Water" is a song by Australian pop-rock band Southern Sons. It was released in August 1992 as the first single from their second studio album, Nothing but the Truth (1992). The song peaked at number 36 in Australia.

== Track listing ==
CD single
| No. | Title | Writer(s) | Length |
|---|---|---|---|
| 1. | "Lead Me to Water" | Phil Buckle | 4:34 |
| 2. | "Can't Breathe" | | 5:20 |

== Weekly charts ==
| Chart (1992) | Peak position |
|---|---|
| Australia (ARIA) | 36 |
