= Always and Ever (song) =

- Australian CD single

Single by Southern Sons

from the album Southern Sons
- B-side: "Stand Alone"
- Released: 5 November 1990
- Length: 3:57
- Label: RCA
- Songwriter(s): Phil Buckle
- Producer(s): Ross Fraser

Southern Sons singles chronology
"Heart in Danger" (1990)	"Always and Ever" (1990)	"Hold Me in Your Arms" (1990)

"Always and Ever" is a song by Australian pop-rock band Southern Sons. It was released in November 1990 as the second single from their debut studio album, Southern Sons (1990). The song peaked at number 16 in Australia.

== Track listing ==
CD single

No.	Title	Writer(s)	Length
1.	"Always and Ever"	Phil Buckle	3:57
2.	"Stand Alone"	Jack Jones, Peter Bowman, Geoff Cain, Virgil Donati	4:15

== Charts ==
Chart (1991)	Peak position
Australia (ARIA)	16
