= You Were There =

- Australian CD single

Single by Southern Sons

from the album Nothing But the Truth
- B-side: "Wildest Love"
- Released: March 1993
- Recorded: 1992
- Studio: Quad Studios (New York)
- Genre: Soft rock
- Length: 3:59
- Label: BMG Records; Ariola Limited
- Songwriter: Phil Buckle
- Producer: Louie Shelton

Southern Sons singles chronology
"Can't Wait Any Longer" (1992)	"You Were There" (1993)	"Sometimes" (1993)

"You Were There" is a song by Australian pop-rock band Southern Sons. It was released in March 1993 as the third single taken from their second studio album, Nothing But the Truth (1992). The song peaked at number 6 in Australia, becoming the band's third top ten single. It also gained popularity in the Philippines.

The song featured in the Sydney Dance Company's production of Beauty and the Beast.

== Track listing ==
CD single (74321134562)

No.	Title	Writer(s)	Length
1.	"You Were There"	Phil Buckle	3:59
2.	"Wildest Love"		4:05

== Charts ==
=== Weekly charts ===
Chart (1993)	Peak position
Australia (ARIA)	6

=== Year-end chart ===
Chart (1993)	Position
Australia (ARIA) Chart	58

== Sales and certifications ==
Region	Certification	Certified units/sales
Australia (ARIA)	Gold	35,000^{^}
^{^} Shipments figures based on certification alone.
