= Hold Me in Your Arms (Southern Sons song) =

1991 single by Southern Sons

- Australian CD single

Single by Southern Sons

from the album Southern Sons
- B-side: "Which Way"
- Released: 18 March 1991
- Length: 4:04
- Label: RCA
- Songwriter: Phil Buckle
- Producer: Ross Fraser

Southern Sons singles chronology
| "Always and Ever" (1990) | "Hold Me in Your Arms" (1991) | "The World Is Mine" (1991) |

"Hold Me in Your Arms" is a song by Australian pop-rock band Southern Sons. It was released in March 1991 as the third single taken from their debut studio album, Southern Sons (1990). The song peaked at number 9 in Australia, becoming the band's second top ten single. At the ARIA Music Awards of 1992, the song was nominated for Song of the Year, losing to "Treaty (Filthy Lucre Remix)" by Yothu Yindi.

== Track listing ==
CD single (105207)

| No. | Title | Writer(s) | Length |
|---|---|---|---|
| 1. | "Hold Me in Your Arms" | Phil Buckle | 4:04 |
| 2. | "Which Way" | Phil Buckle | 3:58 |

== Charts ==
=== Weekly charts ===
| Chart (1991) | Peak position |
|---|---|
| Australia (ARIA) | 9 |

=== Year-end charts ===
| Chart (1991) | Position |
|---|---|
| Australia (ARIA) | 76 |

== Dami Im and Jack Jones version ==
"Hold Me in Your Arms"

Single by Dami Im and Jack Jones
- Released: 7 April 2017
- Genre: Pop
- Length: 3:49
- Label: Sony Music Australia
- Songwriter: Phil Buckle

Dami Im singles chronology
| "Fighting for Love" (2016) | "Hold Me in Your Arms" (2017) | "Crying Underwater" (2019) |

In January 2017, Dami Im sang the song with Guy Sebastian at the Australia Day concert. Sony Music Australia boss Denis Handlin commissioned the new version and secured the original voice of the song by Jack Jones to recreate the song with Im. The Dami Im and Jack Jones version was released on 7 April 2017.
