= Irwin Thomas =

Australian singer, guitarist

- Also known as: Jack Jones, Jack Thomas Whittridge Jones
- Born: Irwin Thomas Whittridge; 6 February 1971 (age 55); New York City, New York, U.S.
- Origin: Melbourne, Victoria, Australia
- Genres: Rock; hard rock; pop rock; soft rock; alternative
- Occupations: Singer; songwriter
- Instruments: Guitar, vocals
- Years active: 1989–present
- Labels: IRUSTU; BMG/Gotham
- Formerly of: Southern Sons; John Farnham; Electric Mary; Ahmet Zappa; Rick Price; Dami Im
- Website: irwinthomas.net

Irwin Thomas (born Irwin Thomas Whittridge, 6 February 1971) is an Australian-American singer-songwriter and guitarist. He has performed professionally as Jack Jones, including as lead vocalist-guitarist in the rock band Southern Sons (1990–1996). He is known for his collaborations with John Farnham. Since 2000, he has performed as Irwin Thomas and released a debut solo album, The Evolution of Irwin Thomas, in 2002. In 2017 his collaboration album with Rick Price, California Dreaming, peaked at No. 7 on the ARIA Albums chart. His other bands or collaborations include Electric Mary, She Said Yes, Ahmet Zappa and Dami Im. Southern Sons reformed in 2019, they have periodically performed and toured into 2026.

== Early life ==
Irwin Thomas Whittridge Jnr was born on 6 February 1971, in Manhattan, New York City. His father, Irwin Thomas Whittridge Snr (2 September 1908 – 24 June 1971), was a former World War 2 army private, who used the stage name, Jack Goode. As Goode he was a Broadway and Hollywood musical comedy actor, who died aged 62 of acute infectious hepatitis following surgery. His mother, Renalda Whittridge (née Green, 1946), was an English-born folk singer and dancer; she emigrated to Australia, as a widow with her son, in 1980. Thomas was later known as Jack Thomas Whittridge Jones.

== Music career ==
While at a secondary school in the city of Traralgon, in the mid-1980s, Thomas was a member of rock groups Get off the Cat and then Survival. In the late 1980s, he was a member of Hans Valen, which covered material by United States heavy rocker, Van Halen; and then he was in Gnomes of Zurich. As Jones, he auditioned as lead vocalist for a Melbourne-based rock-pop group, the State. The State had formed in 1987, with the line-up of Peter Bowman on lead guitar and backing vocals (ex-Cutters), Phil Buckle on guitar and lead vocals (Cutters), Geoff Cain on bass guitar and Virgil Donati on drums (Taste, Cutters). He was considered too young for that group.

In mid-1990, Thomas, as Jones (on lead guitar), worked alongside Buckle in John Farnham's backing band to record that artist's album, Chain Reaction (September 1990). Jones, on lead vocals and lead guitar, was asked by Buckle to form the Southern Sons, with former the State members: Bowman, Cain and Donati. In April 1991, Buckle explained to Charles Miranda of The Canberra Times that Jones was recruited because "[The State] were going nowhere fast. At this stage [in late 1989] Buckle realised that his songs had potential but his voice didn't".

Southern Sons' debut self-titled album was released on 1 June 1990, which peaked at No. 5 on the ARIA Albums chart. Their first single, "Heart in Danger", was released in August, it also reached No. 5 on the related ARIA Singles chart. Jones and Buckle toured Australia and Europe as members of Farnham's backing band to promote Chain Reaction. Southern Sons were a support act on Farnham's tours in 1990 and 1991. The group also undertook their own headlining national tours. Buckle disputed media criticism that Southern Sons "sounded too similar to John Farnham's music"; he felt that although "Jack Jones, has a similar voice, they are very different. He believes the Sons guitar work makes for a harder sound." Bowman left the group as a four-piece in mid-1992.

As a member of Southern Sons, Thomas co-wrote some of their later material, including three tracks on their second album, Nothing But the Truth (November 1992), and six of eleven tracks for their third album, Zone (1995). The latter album was co-produced by the band with former member, Bowman. By the end of 1995 Southern Sons had disbanded.

During the 1990s, Thomas worked as a session musician on albums by other artists including Lisa Edwards' Thru the Hoop (June 1993), Debra Byrne's Sleeping Child (July 1994), Phil and Tommy Emmanuel's Terra Firma (April 1995), Bachelor Girl's Waiting for the Day (November 1998), and Farnham's Live at the Regent Theatre 1st July 1999 (1999) as well as touring in Farnham's backing band for the I Can't Believe He's 50 Tour.

In 1996, Thomas and Donati formed a trio, Hong Kong Meeting, with Steve Hunter on bass guitar. Late in the next year Thomas and Donati joined Tina Arena's backing band for her national tour in support of her third solo studio album, In Deep (August 1997). In the following year, Thomas formed the Jack Jones Band with Garry Gary Beers on bass guitar (ex-INXS) and Alex Formosa on drums. In March 1998 they performed at the Good Vibrations benefit concert by various artists for Marc Hunter, the ailing lead singer of New Zealand-Australian band, Dragon, who had been diagnosed with throat cancer. Thomas covered the tracks "Are You Old Enough", "Voodoo Chile" and "Both of Me", he also performed a duet with Tommy Emmanuel on "Nothing to Lose". A double-CD and a VHS of the concert, both titled Good Vibrations – A Concert for Marc Hunter, were released in mid-1998. Hunter died in July 1998.

Thomas reverted to his birth name in 2000, working with Ahmet Zappa in Los Angeles, and with Beers. He has released music as a solo artist, first for BMG and then as an independent artist, with The Evolution of Irwin Thomas appearing in 2002. Since 2004, he has also been involved with Melbourne band Electric Mary, and he was also in the band, She Said Yes, led by Tania Doko, the lead singer of Bachelor Girl.

In 2019 Southern Sons re-formed after 22 years, for One Electric Day concert. The group toured Australia in 2025 and again in 2026.

=== Private life ===
Jones was married to New Zealand-born Australian actress Rebecca Gibney from 1992 to 1995, which ended in divorce. In December 1994, Gibney promoted her recent romantic comedy film, Lucky Break; she described her differences from her character, to The Canberra Times' David Bongiorno: "She's so unlike any other character I've played before. She's a woman you love to hate... And there's a part of me in there, because I know I wouldn't let my husband (Jack Jones of Southern Sons) go easily at all!"

== Discography ==
=== Albums ===
List of albums, with selected chart positions
Title	Album details	Peak chart positions
Title	Album details	AUS
The Evolution of Irwin Thomas	Released: 2002; Label: Gotham Records (GOTH02042)	-
Dis.con.nect.ed	Released: 2006; Label: IRUSTU Records	-
California Dreaming (with Rick Price)	Released: 29 September 2017; Label: Sony Music Australia	7
Christmas Is Nearing	Released: December 2019; Label: Jack Jones Music	-
Unplugged	Released: February 2020; Label: Jack Jones Music	-
The Vault Vol 1	Released: 2020; Label: Jack Jones Music	-

=== Extended plays ===
List of EPs, with selected details
Title	Details
Made in China	Released: August 2007; Label: Irwin Thomas
