= The Essential 1927 =

Greatest hits album by 1927
- Released: 21 June 2013
- Recorded: 1987−2013
- Genres: Australian rock; pop rock
- Labels: J.Albert & Son; Sony

1927 chronology
The Very Best of 1927 (1996)	The Essential 1927 (2013)	Generation-i (2013)

The Essential 1927 is a greatest hits album by the Australian pop rock band, 1927. It was released on 21 June 2013 and peaked at number 94. The album contains 5 ARIA Chart top 20 singles spanning the band's entire career. Tracks 15 & 16 are listed as "bonus tracks" and released on the band's fourth studio album Generation-i a month later.

== Track listing ==
No.	Title	Writer(s)	Original album	Length
1.	"That's When I Think of You"	Eric Weideman; Garry Frost	...ish, 1988	4:09
2.	"To Love Me"	Weideman; G. Frost	...ish	4:20
3.	"The Other Side"	Weideman	The Other Side, 1990	4:13
4.	"A World Without You"	G. Frost; Phillip Frost	The Other Side	3:18
5.	"Scars"	Weideman	1927, 1992	3:44
6.	"Tell Me a Story"	G. Frost	The Other Side	4:10
7.	"Compulsory Hero"	G. Frost	...ish	4:35
8.	"If I Could"	G. Frost	...ish	3:39
9.	"Don't Forget Me"	Weideman	The Other Side	4:38
10.	"You'll Never Know"	G. Frost; Armondo Hurley	...ish	3:39
11.	"It Ain't Love"	Weideman	1927	4:20
12.	"Give the Kid a Break"	G. Frost	...ish	3:37
13.	"Propaganda Machine"	Weideman; G. Frost; P. Frost	...ish	3:23
14.	"The Mess"	G. Frost	...ish	2:42
15.	"The Story Never Ends"	Weideman	New track	5:29
16.	"Where You Are"	Weideman; Simon Shapiro	New track	4:26

== Charts ==
Chart (2013)	Peak position
Australia (ARIA Chart)	94

== Release history ==
Country	Date	Format	Label	Catalogue
Australia	21 June 2013	CD, digital download	J.Albert & Son, Sony Music Australia	88883713962
