= The Very Best of 1927 =

Greatest hits album by 1927
- Released: 7 October 1996
- Recorded: 1988–1992, 1996
- Studio: Trafalgar Studios; Rhinoceros Studios; Paradise; The Shack
- Genre: Australian rock, pop rock
- Label: EastWest Records; WEA
- Producer: Charles Fisher; Jim Bonneford; Garry Frost; Mark Opitz; David Hemming

1927 chronology
1927 (1992)	The Very Best of 1927 (1996)	The Essential 1927 (2013)

Singles from The Very Best of 1927
- 1. "Nothing I Can Do" Released: November 1996

The Very Best of 1927 is the first greatest hits album by the Australian pop rock band, 1927, released on 7 October 1996. It includes tracks from the band's three studio albums (...Ish, The Other Side and 1927), with two previously unreleased songs.

== Track listing ==
No.	Title	Writer(s)	Producer(s)	Length
1.	"That's When I Think of You"	Eric Weideman; Garry Frost	Charles Fisher	4:13
2.	"You'll Never Know"	Armondo Hurley; Frost	Fisher	3:40
3.	"If I Could"	Frost	Fisher; Jim Bonneford	3:40
4.	"Tell Me a Story"	Frost	Fisher; Frost	4:10
5.	"Don't Forget Me"	Weideman	Fisher	4:40
6.	"The Other Side"	Weideman	Fisher	5:28
7.	"It Ain't Love"	Weideman	Mark Opitz	4:05
8.	"Scars"	Weideman	Opitz	3:49
9.	"To Love Me"	Eric Weideman; Frost	Fisher	4:21
10.	"Compulsory Hero"	Frost	Fisher	4:34
11.	"I'd Die for You" (Eric Weideman solo)	Frost	Frost; David Hemming	3:11
12.	"Nothing I Can Do" (Eric Weideman solo)	Weideman	Fisher	3:48
