= Generation-i =

Studio album by 1927
- Released: 9 August 2013
- Recorded: House of Rock Studio, Western Australia
- Genres: Australian rock; pop rock
- Labels: J.Albert & Son; Sony
- Producer: Eric Weideman

1927 chronology
The Essential 1927 (2013)	Generation-i (2013)

Singles from Generation-i
- 1. "Stop the World" Released: April 2013; 2. "The Story Never Ends" Released: June 2013

Generation-i is the fourth studio album by Australian rock band, 1927, released on 9 August 2013. It was their first studio since 1927 in 1992. The physical version appeared with a bonus DVD with eight live tracks, filmed during the 2012 Roxette tour at Rod Laver Arena (Melbourne), Challenger Stadium (Perth) and Brisbane Entertainment Centre (Brisbane). 1927 promoted the album with an Australian tour from June to September and with Belinda Carlisle from October to December 2013.

== Track listing ==
All tracks are written by Eric Weideman, except where noted.

CD/DD
No.	Title	Writer(s)	Length
1.	"Nobody Knows"		7:00
2.	"Somewhere Before"	Weideman; Simon Shapiro	4:27
3.	"Generation I"		2:01
4.	"The Story Never Ends"		5:34
5.	"All That I Touch"		4:44
6.	"Generation Y"		2:22
7.	"Stop the World"	Weideman; Shapiro	4:51
8.	"The Hell of It"		5:16
9.	"Stop"		4:18
10.	"City Talks"	Shapiro	4:23
11.	"Believe in Your Own Lies"	Shapiro	3:57
12.	"Generation X"		1:53
13.	"Fright of Your Life"		3:46
14.	"Where You Are"	Weideman; Shapiro	4:27

Bonus DVD (Limited Edition)

1. "Fright of Your Life"
2. "To Love Me"
3. "Don't Forget Me"
4. "You'll Never Know"
5. "Tell Me a Story"
6. "Compulsory Hero"
7. "If I Could"
8. "That's When I Think of You"

== Charts ==
Chart (2013)	Peak position
Australian Albums (ARIA)	100

== Release history ==
Country	Date	Format	Label	Catalogue
Australia	9 August 2013	CD, CD/DVD, digital download, streaming	J.Albert & Son, Sony Music Australia	88883762442
