= ARIA Award for Highest-Selling Single =

Former Australian music award

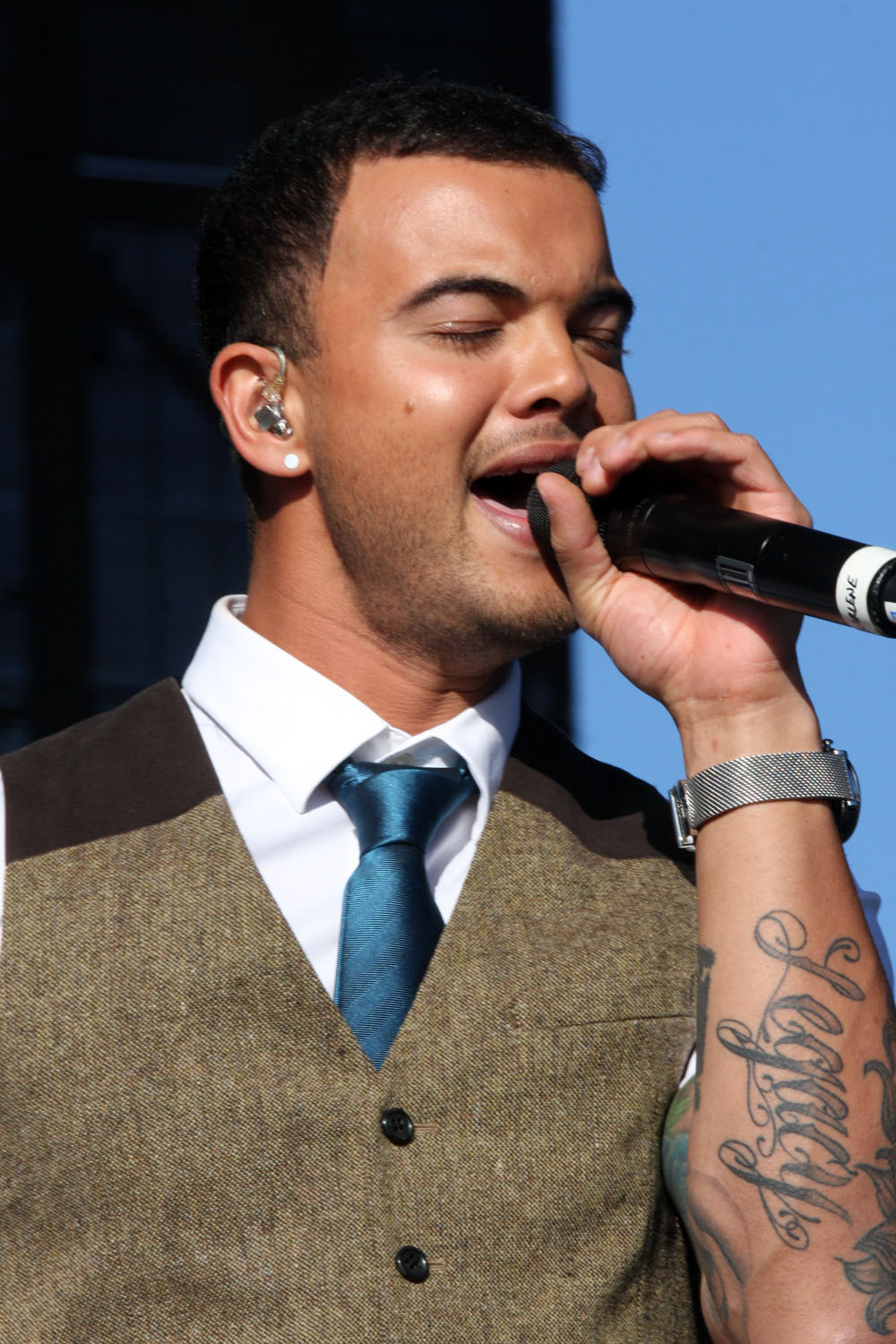
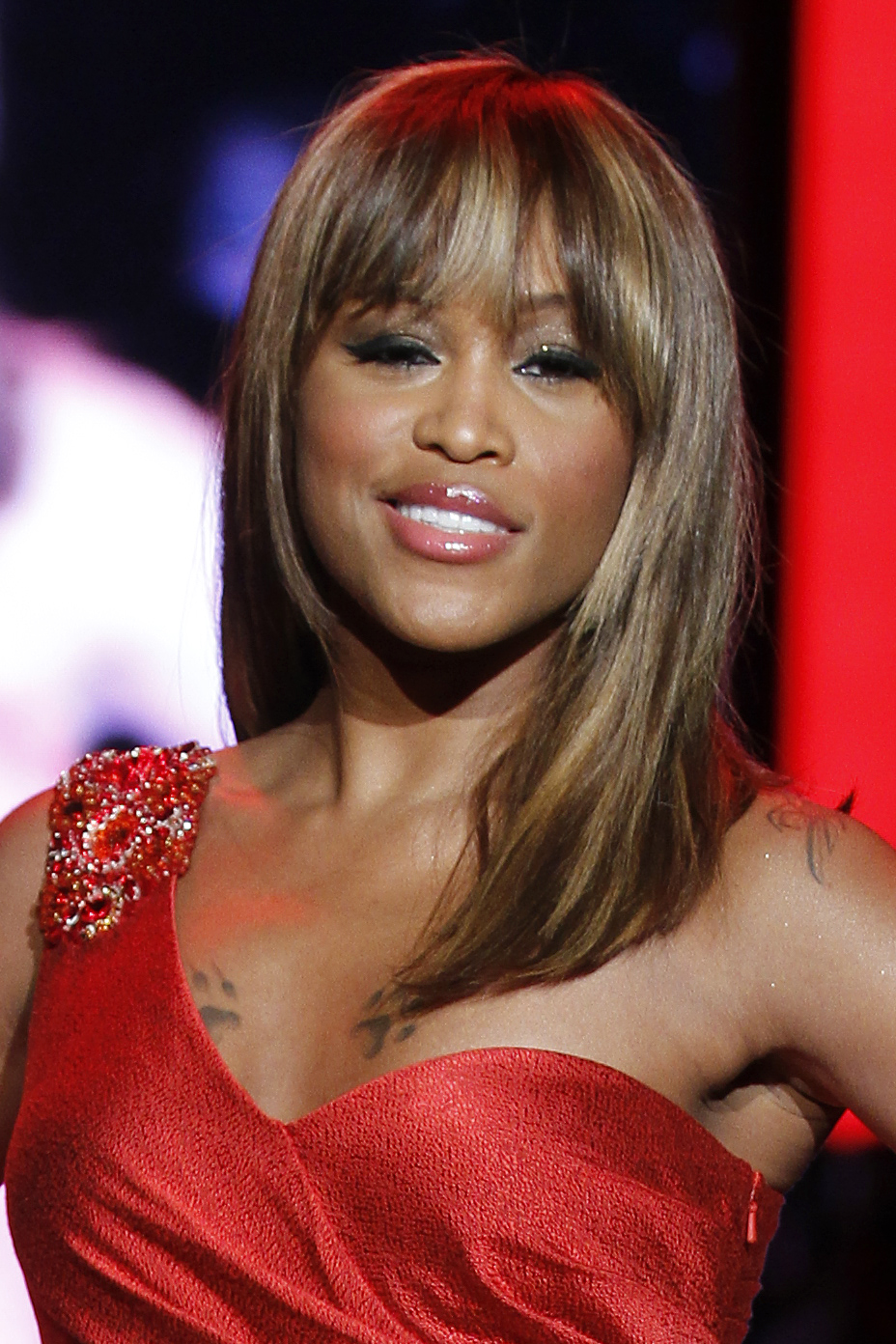
- 2011 winners Guy Sebastian (left) and Eve (right)
- Country: Australia
- Presented by: Australian Recording Industry Association (ARIA)
- First award: 1987
- Final award: 2011
- Currently held by: Guy Sebastian featuring Eve, "Who's That Girl" (2011)

Highlights
- Most wins: Kylie Minogue (3)
- Most nominations: Delta Goodrem (6)
- Website: www.ariaawards.com.au

The ARIA Music Award for Highest-Selling Single was an award presented at the annual ARIA Music Awards. It was presented from 1987 through to 2011.

Kylie Minogue held the record for the most wins at three (1988, 1989 and 2002). The only other artists to win multiple awards in this category were Silverchair in 1995 and 2007 and Guy Sebastian in 2004 and 2011. Delta Goodrem received the most nominations with six, while Human Nature had the most nominations without a win with five. Six artists received multiple nominations in the same year; Human Nature for "Don't Say Goodbye" and "Wishes" and Silverchair for "Abuse Me" and "Freak" in 1997, Natalie Imbruglia for "Big Mistake" and "Torn" in 1998, Goodrem for winning single "Born to Try", "Innocent Eyes" and "Lost Without You" in 2003, becoming the only artist nominated for three singles in the same year, Anthony Callea for winning single "The Prayer" and "Rain"/"Bridge over Troubled Water" in 2005 and the Veronicas for "Untouched" and "Hook Me Up" in 2008.

Five non-Australian artists were nominated as co-lead or featured artists; New Zealand singer Jon Stevens for "Everything's Alright" with Kate Ceberano and John Farnham in 1993, Irish singer Brian McFadden for "Almost Here" with Goodrem in 2005, and American rappers Eve for winning single "Who's That Girl" with Sebastian, becoming the only non-Australian winner, and Ludacris for "Saturday Night" with Jessica Mauboy, and New Zealand singer Kimbra for "Somebody That I Used to Know" with Gotye in 2011.

== Winners and nominees ==
In the following table, the winner is highlighted in a separate colour, and in boldface; the nominees are those that are not highlighted or in boldface.

Winner marked in a separate colour

Year	Winner(s)	Album title
**1987** (1st)
**1987** (1st)	**John Farnham**	**"You're the Voice"**
**1987** (1st)	Boom Crash Opera	"Great Wall"
**1987** (1st)	Do-Re-Mi	"Guns and Butter"
**1987** (1st)	Dragon	"Dreams of Ordinary Men"
**1987** (1st)	INXS & Jimmy Barnes	"Good Times"
**1987** (1st)	Pseudo Echo	"Funky Town"
**1987** (1st)	Wa Wa Nee	"Stimulation"
**1988** (2nd)	**Kylie Minogue**	**"Locomotion"**
**1989** (3rd)
**1989** (3rd)	**Kylie Minogue**	**"I Should Be So Lucky"**
**1989** (3rd)	1927	"If I Could"
**1989** (3rd)	Australian Olympians	"You're Not Alone"
**1989** (3rd)	Crowded House	"Better Be Home Soon"
**1989** (3rd)	John Farnham	"Age of Reason"
**1989** (3rd)	Go 101	"Build It Up"
**1990** (4th)	**Kate Ceberano**	**"Bedroom Eyes"**
**1991** (5th)	**Craig McLachlan and Check 1-2**	**"Mona"**
**1992** (6th)
**1992** (6th)	**Melissa Tkautz**	**"Read My Lips"**
**1992** (6th)	Daryl Braithwaite	"The Horses"
**1992** (6th)	Jimmy Barnes and John Farnham	"When Something Is Wrong with My Baby"
**1992** (6th)	The Screaming Jets	"Better"
**1992** (6th)	Jenny Morris	"Break in the Weather"
**1993** (7th)
**1993** (7th)	**Wendy Matthews**	**"The Day You Went Away"**
**1993** (7th)	Euphoria	"One in a Million"
**1993** (7th)	John Paul Young	"Love Is in the Air"
**1993** (7th)	Frente!	"Accidently Kelly Street"
**1993** (7th)	Girlfriend	"Take It from Me"
**1993** (7th)	Kate Ceberano, John Farnham and Jon Stevens	"Everything's Alright"
**1994** (8th)
**1994** (8th)	**Peter Andre**	**"Gimme a Little Sign"**
**1994** (8th)	Chocolate Starfish	"You're So Vain"
**1994** (8th)	INXS	"The Gift"
**1994** (8th)	The Screaming Jets	"Shivers"
**1994** (8th)	Things of Stone and Wood	"Happy Birthday Helen"
**1995** (9th)
**1995** (9th)	**Silverchair**	**"Tomorrow"**
**1995** (9th)	Merril Bainbridge	"Mouth"
**1995** (9th)	Chocolate Starfish	"Mountain"
**1995** (9th)	Kulcha	"Shaka Jam"
**1995** (9th)	Kylie Minogue	"Confide in Me"
**1996** (10th)
**1996** (10th)	**CDB**	**"Let's Groove"**
**1996** (10th)	Crowded House	"Everything Is Good for You"
**1996** (10th)	Merril Bainbridge	"Under the Water"
**1996** (10th)	Peter Andre	"Mysterious Girl"
**1996** (10th)	Regurgitator	New (EP) (Note: ARIA lists the Regurgitator highest selling single as "New Detention". Regurgitator's highest charting single for 1995/96 was "New". They have not released a single called "New Detention".)
**1997** (11th)
**1997** (11th)	**Savage Garden**	**"Truly Madly Deeply"**
**1997** (11th)	Human Nature	"Don't Say Goodbye"
**1997** (11th)	Human Nature	"Wishes"
**1997** (11th)	Silverchair	"Abuse Me"
**1997** (11th)	Silverchair	"Freak"
**1998** (12th)
**1998** (12th)	**The Living End**	**"Second Solution / Prisoner of Society"**
**1998** (12th)	John Farnham and Human Nature	"Every Time You Cry"
**1998** (12th)	Natalie Imbruglia	"Big Mistake"
**1998** (12th)	Natalie Imbruglia	"Torn"
**1998** (12th)	Tina Arena	"Burn"
**1999** (13th)
**1999** (13th)	**Joanne Accom**	**"Jackie"**
**1999** (13th)	Bachelor Girl	"Buses and Trains"
**1999** (13th)	Human Nature	"Last to Know"
**1999** (13th)	Savage Garden	"The Animal Song"
**1999** (13th)	Silverchair	"Anthem for the Year 2000"
**2000** (14th)
**2000** (14th)	**Madison Avenue**	**"Don't Call Me Baby"**
**2000** (14th)	Bardot	"Poison"
**2000** (14th)	Chris Franklin	"Bloke"
**2000** (14th)	Sister2Sister	"Sister"
**2000** (14th)	Vanessa Amorosi	"Absolutely Everybody"
**2001** (15th)
**2001** (15th)	**Scandal'us**	**"Me, Myself & I"**
**2001** (15th)	Human Nature	"He Don't Love You"
**2001** (15th)	Nikki Webster	"Strawberry Kisses"
**2001** (15th)	Powderfinger	"My Happiness" (Note: ARIA lists the Powderfinger highest selling single as "Odyssey Number Five". Powderfinger's highest charting single for 2000–2001 was "My Happiness", there is no track called "Odyssey Number Five" on their album, Odyssey Number Five.)
**2001** (15th)	Kylie Minogue	"On A Night Like This"
**2002** (16th)
**2002** (16th)	**Kylie Minogue**	**"Can't Get You Out of My Head"**
**2002** (16th)	Alex Lloyd	"Amazing"
**2002** (16th)	Holly Valance	"Kiss Kiss"
**2002** (16th)	Kasey Chambers	"Not Pretty Enough"
**2002** (16th)	Shakaya	"Stop Calling Me"
**2003** (17th)
**2003** (17th)	**Delta Goodrem**	**"Born to Try"**
**2003** (17th)	Amiel Daemion	"Lovesong"
**2003** (17th)	The Androids	"Do It with Madonna"
**2003** (17th)	Delta Goodrem	"Innocent Eyes"
**2003** (17th)	Delta Goodrem	"Lost Without You"
**2004** (18th)
**2004** (18th)	**Guy Sebastian**	**"Angels Brought Me Here"**
**2004** (18th)	Delta Goodrem	"Predictable"
**2004** (18th)	Paulini	"Angel Eyes"
**2004** (18th)	Shannon Noll	"What About Me"
**2004** (18th)	Spiderbait	"Black Betty"
**2005** (19th)
**2005** (19th)	**Anthony Callea**	**"The Prayer"**
**2005** (19th)	Anthony Callea	"Rain" / "Bridge Over Troubled Water"
**2005** (19th)	Casey Donovan	"Listen With Your Heart"
**2005** (19th)	Delta Goodrem and Brian McFadden	"Almost Here"
**2005** (19th)	Missy Higgins	"The Special Two"
**2006** (20th)
**2006** (20th)	**TV Rock featuring Seany B**	**"Flaunt It"**
**2006** (20th)	Kate DeAraugo	"Maybe Tonight"
**2006** (20th)	Lee Harding	"Wasabi"
**2006** (20th)	Shannon Noll	"Shine"
**2006** (20th)	Youth Group	"Forever Young"
**2007** (21st)
**2007** (21st)	**Silverchair**	**"Straight Lines"**
**2007** (21st)	Natalie Bassingthwaighte and Shannon Noll	"Don't Give Up"
**2007** (21st)	Missy Higgins	"Steer"
**2007** (21st)	Damien Leith	"Night of My Life"
**2007** (21st)	Wolfmother	"Joker & the Thief"
**2008** (22nd)
**2008** (22nd)	**Gabriella Cilmi**	**"Sweet About Me"**
**2008** (22nd)	Delta Goodrem	"In This Life"
**2008** (22nd)	The Potbelleez	"Don't Hold Back"
**2008** (22nd)	The Veronicas	"Untouched"
**2008** (22nd)	The Veronicas	"Hook Me Up"
**2009** (23rd)
**2009** (23rd)	**Jessica Mauboy**	**"Running Back"**
**2009** (23rd)	Empire of the Sun	"Walking on a Dream"
**2009** (23rd)	Evermore	"Hey Boys and Girls"
**2009** (23rd)	Jessica Mauboy	"Burn"
**2009** (23rd)	Wes Carr	"You"
**2010** (24th)
**2010** (24th)	No award given	
**2011** (25th)
**2011** (25th)	**Guy Sebastian featuring Eve**	**"Who's That Girl"**
**2011** (25th)	Birds of Tokyo	"Plans"
**2011** (25th)	Gotye featuring Kimbra	"Somebody That I Used to Know"
**2011** (25th)	Havana Brown	"We Run the Night"
**2011** (25th)	Jessica Mauboy featuring Ludacris	"Saturday Night"

== Artists with multiple wins ==
3 wins

- Kylie Minogue

2 wins

- Guy Sebastian
- Silverchair

== Artists with multiple nominations ==
6 nominations

- Delta Goodrem

5 nominations

- John Farnham
- Human Nature
- Kylie Minogue
- Silverchair

3 nominations

- Kate Ceberano (Note: Including "You're Not Alone" as a member of the supergroup Australian Olympians.)
- Jessica Mauboy
- Shannon Noll

2 nominations

- Peter Andre
- Merril Bainbridge
- Jimmy Barnes
- Daryl Braithwaite
- Anthony Callea
- Chocolate Starfish
- Crowded House
- Missy Higgins
- Natalie Imbruglia
- INXS
- Keren Minshull (Note: One as a member of Euphoria and "You're Not Alone" as a member of the supergroup Australian Olympians.)
- Savage Garden
- The Screaming Jets
- Guy Sebastian
- The Veronicas
