= ARIA Award for Breakthrough Artist – Single =

Former Australian music award

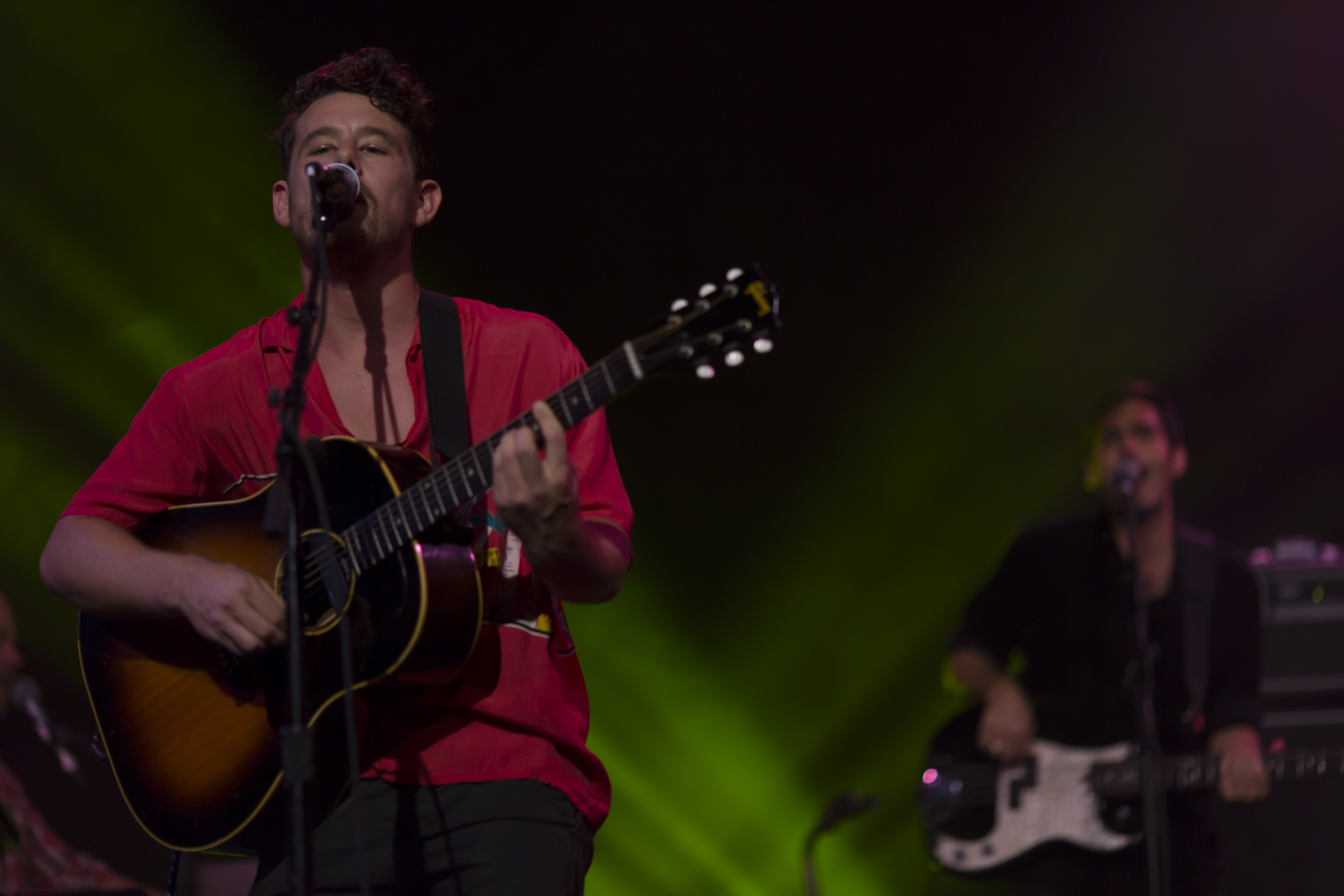
- 2011 winner Boy & Bear
- Country: Australia
- Presented by: Australian Recording Industry Association (ARIA)
- First award: 1989
- Final award: 2011
- Currently held by: Boy & Bear, "Feeding Line" (2011)
- Website: www.ariaawards.com.au

The ARIA Music Award for Breakthrough Artist – Single was an award presented at the annual ARIA Music Awards. It was presented from 1989 through to 2009 and 2011.

This, and the ARIA Award for Breakthrough Artist – Album was merged in 2012 to form a single award for Breakthrough Artist – Release.

== Winners and nominees ==
Year	Winner(s)	Album Title
1989 (3rd)	1927	"That's When I Think of You"
1989 (3rd)	Catfish	"When You Dance"
1989 (3rd)	Go 101	"Build It Up"
1989 (3rd)	The Hippos	"Dark Age"
1989 (3rd)	Johnny Diesel & the Injectors	"Don't Need Love"
1989 (3rd)	Schnell Fenster	"Whisper"
1990 (4th)	Ian Moss	"Tucker's Daughter"
1990 (4th)	Girl Overboard	"I Can't Believe"
1990 (4th)	Gyan	"Wait"
1990 (4th)	The Hummingbirds	"Blush"
1990 (4th)	Max Q	"Way of the World"
1991 (5th)	Wendy Matthews	"Token Angels"
1991 (5th)	Absent Friends featuring Wendy Matthews	"I Don't Want to Be with Nobody but You"
1991 (5th)	Archie Roach	"Took the Children Away"
1991 (5th)	Seven Stories	"Sleeping Through Another War"
1991 (5th)	Southern Sons	"Heart in Danger"
1992 (6th)
1992 (6th)	Baby Animals	"Early Warning"
1992 (6th)	Deborah Conway	"It's Only the Beginning"
1992 (6th)	Maybe Dolls	"Nervous Kid"
1992 (6th)	Troy Newman	"Love Gets Rough"
1992 (6th)	Richard Pleasance	"Sarah (I Miss You)"
1993 (7th)
1993 (7th)	Frente!	"Ordinary Angels"
1993 (7th)	Company of Strangers	"Motor City (I Get Lost)"
1993 (7th)	Rick Price	"Not a Day Goes By"
1993 (7th)	The Sharp	"Talking Sly"
1993 (7th)	Things of Stone and Wood	"Share This Wine"
1994 (8th)
1994 (8th)	The Badloves	"Lost"
1994 (8th)	Chocolate Starfish	"You're So Vain"
1994 (8th)	Christine Anu	"Last Train"
1994 (8th)	D.I.G	"Re-invent Yourself"
1994 (8th)	Vincent Stone	"Sunshine"
1995 (9th)
1995 (9th)	Silverchair	"Tomorrow"
1995 (9th)	Merril Bainbridge	"Mouth"
1995 (9th)	D.I.G.	"The Favourite"
1995 (9th)	Max Sharam	"Coma"
1995 (9th)	Vika and Linda	"When Will You Fall for Me"
1996 (10th)
1996 (10th)	Deni Hines	"It's Alright"
1996 (10th)	Monique Brumby	"Fool for You"
1996 (10th)	Nikka Costa	"Master Blaster"
1996 (10th)	Rail	"Immune Deficiency"
1996 (10th)	Savage Garden	"I Want You"
1997 (11th)
1997 (11th)	The Superjesus	"Shut My Eyes" / Eight Step Rail
1997 (11th)	Fini Scad	"Coppertone" / Testrider
1997 (11th)	Frank Bennett	"Creep"
1997 (11th)	Gina G	"Ooh Aah... Just a Little Bit"
1997 (11th)	Mark Seymour	"Last Ditch Cabaret"
1998 (12th)
1998 (12th)	Natalie Imbruglia	"Torn"
1998 (12th)	Hot Rollers	"Wickerman Shoes"
1998 (12th)	Diana Anaid	"I Go Off"
1998 (12th)	Primary	"Vicious Precious"
1998 (12th)	Marie Wilson	"Next Time"
1999 (13th)
1999 (13th)	Alex Lloyd	"Lucky Star"
1999 (13th)	Taxiride	"Get Set"
1999 (13th)	Frenzal Rhomb	"You Are Not My Friend"
1999 (13th)	Gerling	"Enter, Space Capsule"
1999 (13th)	Not from There	"Sich Offnen"
2000 (14th)
2000 (14th)	Madison Avenue	"Don't Call Me Baby"
2000 (14th)	28 Days	"Rip it Up"
2000 (14th)	Augie March	"Asleep in Perfection (Waltz)"
2000 (14th)	Lo-Tel	"Teenager of the Year"
2000 (14th)	Vanessa Amorosi	"Have a Look"
2001 (15th)
2001 (15th)	The Avalanches	"Frontier Psychiatrist"
2001 (15th)	Eskimo Joe	"Who Sold Her Out"
2001 (15th)	george	"Special Ones"
2001 (15th)	Lash	John Butler Trio EP
2001 (15th)	Lo-Tel	"Take Me Away"
2002 (16th)
2002 (16th)	The Vines	"Get Free"
2002 (16th)	1200 Techniques	"Karma (What Goes Around)"
2002 (16th)	Holly Valance	"Kiss Kiss"
2002 (16th)	Machine Gun Fellatio	"Girl of My Dreams (Is Giving Me Nightmares)"
2002 (16th)	The Waifs	"London Still"
2003 (17th)
2003 (17th)	Delta Goodrem	"Born to Try"
2003 (17th)	Candice Alley	"Falling"
2003 (17th)	The Casanovas	"Shake It"
2003 (17th)	Rogue Traders	"One of My Kind"
2003 (17th)	The Sleepy Jackson	"Vampire Racecourse"
2004 (18th)
2004 (18th)	Jet	"Are You Gonna Be My Girl"
2004 (18th)	Dallas Crane	"Dirty Hearts"
2004 (18th)	Little Birdy	"Relapse"
2004 (18th)	Missy Higgins	"Scar"
2004 (18th)	The Cat Empire	"Days Like These"
2005 (19th)
2005 (19th)	End of Fashion	'"O Yeah"
2005 (19th)	Joel Turner and the Modern Day Poets	"These Kids"
2005 (19th)	Kisschasy	"Do-Do's & Whoa-Oh's"
2005 (19th)	The Veronicas	"4ever"
2005 (19th)	Wolfmother	"Woman"
2006 (20th)
2006 (20th)	Youth Group	"Forever Young"
2006 (20th)	Gyroscope	"Fast Girl"
2006 (20th)	Hilltop Hoods	"Clown Prince"
2006 (20th)	Sneaky Sound System	"I Love It"
2006 (20th)	TV Rock featuring Seany B	"Flaunt It"
2006 (20th)	Starky	"Hey Bang Bang"
2007 (21st)
2007 (21st)	Operator Please	"Just a Song About Ping Pong"
2007 (21st)	Damien Leith	"Night of My Life"
2007 (21st)	Kate Miller-Heidke	"Words"
2007 (21st)	Small Mercies	"Innocent"
2007 (21st)	Something With Numbers	"Apple of the Eye (Lay Me Down)"
2008 (22nd)
2008 (22nd)	Gabriella Cilmi	"Sweet About Me"
2008 (22nd)	Angus & Julia Stone	"The Beast"
2008 (22nd)	Sam Sparro	"Black and Gold"
2008 (22nd)	The Panics	"Don't Fight It"
2008 (22nd)	The Potbelleez	"Don't Hold Back"
2009 (23rd)
2009 (23rd)	Ladyhawke	"My Delirium"
2009 (23rd)	Art vs. Science	Art vs. Science
2009 (23rd)	Bluejuice	"Broken Leg"
2009 (23rd)	Jessica Mauboy	"Running Back"
2009 (23rd)	Lisa Mitchell	"Coin Laundry"
2010 (24th)
2010 (24th)	No award given	
2011 (25th)
2011 (25th)	Boy & Bear	"Feeding Line"
2011 (25th)	Drapht	"Rapunzel"
2011 (25th)	Havana Brown	"We Run the Night"
2011 (25th)	The Jezabels	"Dark Storm"
2011 (25th)	Zoë Badwi	"Freefallin"
