= 1927 (disambiguation) =

1927 is a year in the Gregorian calendar.

1927 may also refer to:

- 1927 (band), an Australian band
  - 1927 (album), the band's 1992 self-titled album
- 1927 (theatre company), a British theatre company
