= Austen Tayshus =

Australian comedian

- Born: Alexander Jacob Gutman; New York City, New York, U.S.
- Occupations: Comedian, actor
- Years active: 1981–present
- Website: www.austentayshus.com

Alexander Jacob "Sandy" Gutman, better known as Austen Tayshus, is an American-born Jewish Australian comedian. He is best known for the 1983 comedy single "Australiana", a spoken word piece which is filled with Australian puns.

His humor often draws on his Jewish background. A tall man, standing at 198 centimetres (6 ft 6 in), he appears on stage wearing a black suit and dark sunglasses. He is characterised by a deep, resonant voice. He is often moody, and he is renowned for taunting his audience and venue staff.

== Early life and education ==
Alexander (Sandy) Jacob Gutman was born in New York City to Polish Jewish parents, and moved to Sydney at the age of one. He is the son of a Hasidic Holocaust survivor. He grew up in an Orthodox Jewish home.

Gutman attended Vaucluse Boys' High School from 1966 to 1971.

He received a Commonwealth Scholarship to Sydney University in 1972, where he began a dentistry degree. After two years he lost interest in dentistry and changed to an arts degree, and subsequently to a film directing course at the Australian Film, Television and Radio School (AFTRS), graduating as a film director in 1978. He wrote and directed three short comedies while at film school, Eric and Alice in 1975, Waves in 1976, and The End in 1977.

== Career ==
After graduation from the AFTRS, Gutman worked at ABC Television as an assistant cameraman in their Cinecamera department. From 1979 to 1980 he freelanced as a camera assistant and cinematographer on film clips for Australian bands including Cold Chisel, the Angels, and Mental as Anything.

=== 1981–1984 ===
Gutman's stand-up comedy career began at the Sydney Comedy Store at the beginning of 1981. The stage name "Austen Tayshus" is an aptronym based on the word "ostentatious".

He first gained public recognition in 1983 when he signed to Regular Records, who released his comedy single, "Australiana". It is a spoken word piece that contains many puns using Australian terms, especially the names of places and animals. "Australiana" became the biggest-selling Australian 12-inch single ever, and was number one on the charts in 1983 for 13 weeks.

In 1984, Tayshus released the single "Phantom Shuffle", which rose to number 16 nationally on the ARIA Chart, followed by his debut album When the Ticklers Stopped Quivering, which also peaked within the Australian top 100.

In 1984, he sold out the Sydney Entertainment Centre, supported by local comedians.

=== 1985–1989 ===
In February 1988, Tayshus released the single "Highway Corroboree", which peaked at number 46 on the Australian charts. It was lifted from the album Whispering Joke (itself a pun on the classic John Farnham album Whispering Jack). He performed the single live on the Sunday Program in 1988, on Channel Nine, especially for the Australian bicentennial anniversary. His controversial monologue sided with the Aboriginal people, and was highly critical of the first white settlers.

In the late 1980s, Tayshus toured Australia with other well-known comedians. He often introduced young and gifted new comics to his audiences.

=== 1990s: Film ===
In 1990 Tayshus relocated to Los Angeles to pursue a movie career. He had a small cameo in the Sharon Stone movie Sliver, directed by mate and fellow film school alumnus Phillip Noyce.

At night, Tayshus worked in comedy clubs in LA and in New York. He was represented for stand-up by Irvin Arthur and Associates in LA in 1993 and for film work by Metropolitain. He auditioned for movies including Ace Ventura Pet Detective and Clear and Present Danger.

His stay in Los Angeles culminated in a collaboration on a low-budget feature film titled Dream Factory, which he co-wrote with the Director Paschal Franchot, and was lead actor. The film was a tragi-comedy about Austen's last days in LA trying to become a big shot. It also included cameos from Naomi Watts, Billy Zane, and Nehemiah Persoff.

Returning to Australia in 1997, Tayshus wrote and starred in a short film titled Intolerance. At Tropfest in 1998, the film won the award for Best Film, and Tayshus won Best Actor. The film had been entered in competition under the name of a fictitious feminist filmmaker, Laura Feinstein. When the film won, the head of Tropfest, John Polson, announced that the top prize had finally been won by a woman. When the director, Paul Fenech, jumped up to claim the award, to everyone's surprise, saying there was no Laura Feinstein, it created great controversy.

The Tropfest win led directly to work on the Jane Campion film Holy Smoke!, Emma-Kate Croghan's Strange Planet and Baz Luhrmann's Moulin Rouge!.

In 1999, Tayshus participated in the television series Aussie Jokers, produced and directed by Paul Fenech for SBS TV. His segment was an historical journey about his father's Holocaust experiences in Poland, from his hometown of Łódź, to the death camp Treblinka, to his rescue from Bergen-Belsen. It traces Isaac Gutman's life from 1939 to 1945, when most of his family was murdered by the Germans. The documentary has been shown several times on SBS and is available on YouTube.

A documentary about Tayshus, produced by Angry Messiah Pictures and titled Austen Tayshus Skin in the Game, was completed in 2020 and was scheduled for release on Foxdocos Channel on 17 July 2022.

=== 1999–2009: "Footyana" ===
In July 2000, Tayshus released "Footyana", a comedy piece in the style of "Australiana", referring to Australian rules football and the National Rugby League. It includes such lines as:

- "Are Steve and Tin gay or something?" (Stephen Tingay)
- "We passed Liam the Burger Rings. Come on, Liam, pick a ring." (Liam Pickering)

He performed it live on the television show Live and Kicking to great acclaim.

=== 2010: Political career ===
In August 2010, Tayshus ran for the Australian House of Representatives in the Division of Warringah in the August federal election, representing the Australian Sex Party. He stood against Liberal Party leader Tony Abbott. He subsequently ran in the 2011 New South Wales state election as a member of the Outdoor Recreation Party, contesting opposition leader Barry O'Farrell's seat of Ku-ring-gai.

In 2012, Tayshus appeared as a panellist on the ABC's panel show Q&A to promote the release of his biography, Austen Tayshus: Merchant of Menace, written by Richard Murphy and Ross Fitzgerald.

In 2025, Tayshus faced criticism over a 2024 incident involving ABC regional radio. Tayshus alleged that his interview requests were denied due to antisemitism. In response, ABC Chair Kim Williams intervened multiple times, contacting editorial staff to question their decisions. This raised concerns about editorial independence within the ABC. It was later revealed that Tayshus had received significant airtime on the ABC, with over 90 minutes of free publicity across 11 segments since mid-2023.

== Personal life ==
Gutman has two adult daughters.

== Discography ==
=== Studio albums ===
List of studio albums, with selected details and chart positions
Title	Album details	Peak chart positions
Title	Album details	AUS
When the Ticklers Stopped Quivering	Released: December 1984; Label: Regular (RRLP 1214)	76
Whispering Joke	Released: February 1988; Label: MAX (MAX LP188)	—

=== Live albums ===
List of live albums
Title	Album details
Lounge Lizard Live	Released: 1985; Label: Regular Records (L38473)
Alive and Shticking	Released: 1994; Label: Laughing Stock

=== Singles ===
List of singles, with selected chart positions
Year	Single	Peak chart positions	Certification	Album
Year	Single	AUS	Certification	Album
1983	"Australiana"	1	ARIA: 2× Platinum	Non-album single
1984	"Phantom Shuffle"	16		When the Ticklers Stopped Quivering
1986	"The Pope Down Under"	—		Non-album single
1988	"Highway Corroboree"	43		Whispering Joke
1988	"They're Coming to Take Me Away, Ha Ha"	—		Whispering Joke
1989	"Put Down That Stubbie"	—		Non-album singles
1990	"Rappin' Back to My Roots"	—		Non-album singles
1995	"I'm Jacques Chirac (And I Don't Give a...!)"	—		Non-album singles
1998	"Xenophobia"	—		Non-album singles
2000	"Footyana"	78		Non-album singles

== Awards and nominations ==
=== Countdown Australia Music Awards ===
The Countdown Australia Music Awards were an awards ceremony produced by Countdown in collaboration with the Australian Recording Industry Association (ARIA), from 1981 to 1986.

Year	Nominee / work	Award	Result
1983	"Australiana"	Best Debut Single	Nominated
1983	himself	Special Achievement	Won
1984	"Phantom Shuffle"	Best Male Performance in a Video	Nominated

=== ARIA Music Awards ===
The ARIA Music Awards is an annual awards ceremony that commenced in 1987 and recognises excellence, innovation, and achievement across all genres of Australian music. Tayshus has been nominated for four awards.

Year	Nominee / work	Award	Result
1987	Do the Pope	Best Comedy Release	Nominated
1989	"Highway Corroboree"	Best Comedy Release	Nominated
1995	Alive and Schticking	Best Comedy Release	Nominated
1996	"I'm Jacques Chirac"	Best Comedy Release	Nominated

== Literature ==
- Fitzgerald, Ross; Murphy, Rick (2011). Austen Tayshus: The Merchant of Menace. Hale & Iremonger.
