= Australiana (song) =

Single by Austen Tayshus
- A-side: "Australiana"
- B-side: "The Comedy Commando"
- Released: June 1983
- Recorded: January 1983
- Studio: The Loony Bin and The Comedy Store
- Genre: Comedy
- Length: 4:23
- Label: Regular Records
- Songwriters: Billy Birmingham, Austen Tayshus
- Producers: Billy Birmingham, Paul Goodwin

Austen Tayshus singles chronology
"Australiana" (1983)	"Phantom Shuffle" (1984)

"Australiana" (Spanish for "Australian") is a spoken-word comedy single by Austen Tayshus, written by Billy Birmingham and recorded live at The Comedy Store, Sydney, in 1983. It was only available on 12-inch records. It was the No. 1 single in Australia in 1983 for eight weeks, seven of them consecutive.

== History ==
The single was banned in Victoria for a week, due to the B-side "The Comedy Commando". This led to a gap between the record's first number-one placing (15 August) and its seven-week run at the number-one spot (5 September – 17 October).

The single was rereleased on CD in 2003 (EMI 7243 5 52755 0 9), containing the A-side and the video for the A-side but not the original B-side.

== Sketch structure ==
The sketch is built on extensive sets of equivocations that form puns relating to Australian place names and icons, for example:

My mate, Boomer, rang. Said he was having a few people around for a Barbie. Will Walla be there? Vegie might come. Let's go, Anna. Only if Din goes. Nulla bores me. Speak ill of Warra. Ayers rock in. Alice springs into action. Thanks, Warra, ta. Has Eucum been in? Wait until Gum leaves. On the lawn, Ceston. Marie knows. Leave Jack around a party. Adel laid it on me. Do you wanna game of euchre, Lyptus? Can Wom bat? Can Tenta field? Dar wins every time. Is Bass straight? Swim in the River, Ina. I've got no cossie, Oscar. Without a thread, Bo. Perish the thought. No cooler bar maid. Where can Marsu pee, Al? You reek of Stockade. Cook a burra. A pair of queens land in. Crack on to Woomba. Try to mount Isa. Trying to plait her puss. Flash your wanger at her. What'll 'ey care? Seen a cock or two. Pack Bill a bong. Will a didgery do? Where's the Tally-Ho, Bart? Great, Barry—a reefer, What is it mate? Noosa Heads of course. Blew Mountains away. Lord! How? Hey! Man! How much can a Koala bear? Lead you astray, Liana.

== Track listing ==
Vinyl (RRT 606)

- Side A "Australiana"
- Side B "The Comedy Commando"

CD single (5527550)

1. "Australiana" - 4:23
2. "Australiana" (CD Rom) - 4:27

== Charts ==
=== Weekly charts ===
Chart (1983)	Position
Australian (Kent Music Report)	1

=== Year-end charts ===
Chart (1983)	Position
Australian (Kent Music Report)	1

== Certifications ==
Region	Certification	Certified units/sales
Australia (ARIA)	2× Platinum	200,000^{^}
^{^} Shipments figures based on certification alone.

== See also ==
- List of number-one singles in Australia during the 1980s
