= Tell Me a Story =

Tell Me a Story may refer to:

== Music ==
- "Tell Me a Story" (1927 song), 1990
- "Tell Me a Story (About the Night Before)", a song by Hilary Duff
- "Tell Me a Story" (Terry Gilkyson song), 1953, written by Terry Gilkyson and recorded by Jimmy Boyd & Frankie Laine
- "Tell Me a Story", a song by Iggy Pop from New Values

== Literature ==
- Tell Me a Story (book), a children's book by Mary Louisa Molesworth
- Tell Me a Story: Fifty Years and 60 Minutes in Television, a book by Don Hewitt
- Tell Me a Story: A New Look at Real and Artificial Memory, a book by Roger Schank
- "Tell Me a Story", a newspaper column carried by Universal Press Syndicate

== Television ==
- Tell Me a Story (TV series), CBS All Access series
