= 1989 ARIA Music Awards =

Annual Australian music awards

- Date: 6 March 1989
- Venue: Darling Harbour Convention Centre, Sydney, New South Wales

Highlights
- Most wins: Crowded House (4)
- Most nominations: 1927 (9); Crowded House (9)
- Website: ariaawards.com.au

The Third Australian Recording Industry Association Music Awards (generally known as the ARIA Music Awards or simply the ARIAs) was held on 6 March 1989 at the Darling Harbour Convention Centre in Sydney. First Australian host Greedy Smith of Mental As Anything was assisted by presenters George Martin, Jono & Dano, Barry Bissell of Take 40 Australia, Peter Collins, Peter Jamieson, Jonathan King and Brian Smith to distribute 24 awards. There were no live performances and the awards were not televised.

Some significant changes were made for the third ARIA Awards. In addition to previous categories, Best Independent Release, Breakthrough Artist – Single and Breakthrough Artist – Album were added. The ARIA Hall of Fame inducted two artists: Dame Nellie Melba and Ross Wilson. An Outstanding Achievement Award was presented to INXS. Music journalist, Anthony O'Grady cited ARIA spokesperson Peter Rix, who had felt that The Church's win Single of the Year with "Under the Milky Way" was a highlight. Rix elaborated, "the industry was capable of judging music on its merit, not by who'd recorded it. The Church were no one's darlings but they had written a great song."

== Presenters ==
The ARIA Awards ceremony was hosted by singer-songwriter Greedy Smith from Mental as Anything. Presenters were:

Presenter(s)	Ref.
Barry Bissell (host of Take 40 Australia)	
Peter Collins (New South Wales politician)
Peter Jamieson
Jono & Dano (comedy duo)
Jonathan King
George Martin (British producer)
Brian Smith

== Awards ==
Winners for each category are bolded with nominees provided below each winner.

=== ARIA Awards ===
- Album of the Year
  - **Crowded House – Temple of Low Men**
    - 1927 – ...ish
    - Big Pig – Bonk
    - The Black Sorrows – Hold On To Me
    - John Farnham – Age of Reason
- Single of the Year
  - **The Church – "Under the Milky Way"**
    - 1927 – "That's When I Think of You"
    - Crowded House – "Better Be Home Soon"
    - John Farnham – "Age of Reason"
    - INXS – "Never Tear Us Apart"
- Best Group
  - **INXS – "Never Tear Us Apart"**
    - The Black Sorrows – Hold On To Me
    - Crowded House – Temple of Low Men
    - The Go-Betweens – 16 Lovers Lane
    - Midnight Oil – "Dreamworld"
- Best Female Artist
  - **Kate Ceberano – You've Always Got the Blues**
    - Marcia Hines – "The Lord's Prayer"
    - Wendy Matthews – You've Always Got the Blues
    - Kylie Minogue – Kylie
    - Sharon O'Neill – "We're Only Human"
- Best Male Artist
  - **Jimmy Barnes – Barnestorming**
    - Stephen Cummings – A Life Is a Life
    - John Farnham – Age of Reason
    - Paul Kelly & The Coloured Girls – "Forty Miles to Saturday Night"
    - James Reyne – "Motor's Too Fast"
- Best New Talent
  - **Johnny Diesel & the Injectors – "Don't Need Love"**
    - Died Pretty – Lost
    - Go 101 – "Build It Up"
    - Roaring Jack – The Cat Among the Pigeons
    - The State – "Real Love"
- Breakthrough Artist – Album
  - **1927 – ...ish**
  - **Rockmelons – Tales of the City**
    - Catfish – Unlimited Address
    - Kylie Minogue – Kylie
    - Schnell Fenster – The Sound of Trees
- Breakthrough Artist – Single
  - **1927 – "That's When I Think of You"**
    - Catfish – "When You Dance"
    - Go 101 – "Build It Up"
    - The Hippos – "Dark Age"
    - Johnny Diesel & the Injectors – "Don't Need Love"
    - Schnell Fenster – "Whisper"
- Best Country Album
  - **John Williamson – Boomerang Café**
    - Flying Emus – "I Just Want to Dance With You"
    - Slim Dusty – G'day, G'day!
    - Smoky Dawson & Trevor Knight – "High Country"
    - Jenine Vaughan – "Gypsy Man"
- Best Indigenous Release
  - **Weddings Parties Anything – Roaring Days**
    - Kev Carmody – Pillars of Society
    - Flying Emus– "This Town" / "Darling Street"
    - Midnight Oil – "Dreamworld"
    - Dave Steel – "The Hardest Part"
- Best Adult Contemporary Album
  - **Crowded House – Temple of Low Men**
    - The Black Sorrows – Hold On To Me
    - Kate Ceberano & Wendy Matthews – You've Always Got the Blues
    - John Farnham – Age of Reason
    - Little River Band – Monsoon
- Best Comedy Release
  - **The Comedy Company – The Comedy Company Album**
    - Austen Tayshus – "Highway Corroboree"
    - Club Veg – Members & Guests & Things
    - Con the Fruiterer – "A Cuppla Days"
    - Kylie Mole – "So Excellent" / "I Go I Go"
    - Rodney Rude – Not Guilty
- Best Independent Release
  - **TISM – "Apathy"**
    - Eric Bogle – Something of Value
    - Flederman – Flederman
    - Larry Sitsky – Contemporary Australian Piano
    - The Spliffs – "Sixteen"
- Highest Selling Album
  - **John Farnham – Age of Reason**
    - The Comedy Company – The Comedy Company Album
    - Crowded House – Temple of Low Men
    - 1927 – ...ish
    - Kylie Minogue – Kylie
    - Various – Australia All Over Vol. 2
- Highest Selling Single
  - **Kylie Minogue – "I Should Be So Lucky"**
    - 1927 – "If I Could"
    - Australian Olympians – "You're Not Alone"
    - Crowded House – "Better Be Home Soon"
    - John Farnham – "Age of Reason"
    - Go 101 – "Build It Up"

=== Fine Arts Awards ===
- Best Jazz Album
  - **Wizards of Oz – Soundtrack**
    - Kate Ceberano & Wendy Matthews – You've Always Got the Blues
    - Cool Dudes – Cool Dudes
    - James Morrison – Postcards from Down Under
    - Various Artists – Jazz Live At Soup Plus
- Best Classical Album
  - **Flederman – Flederman**
    - George Dreyfus – Rush, The Adventures of Sebastian the Fox and Other Goodies
    - Jennifer McGregor – The Jennifer McGregor Album
    - Sydney Symphony Orchestra, Australian Youth Orchestra, Joan Carden, John Howard – Australia Day / Child of Australia
    - Various Artists – Tropic of Capricorn
- Best Children's Album
  - **Peter Combe – Newspaper Mama**
    - Darryl Cotton – Just for Kids
    - Noni Hazlehurst – Shout and Whisper
    - Harold G Raffe and Co – Harold and Friends
    - John Schumann – John Schumann Goes Looby-Loo
    - Don Spencer – Australian Animal Songs
    - The Wayfarers – Home Among the Gum Trees – Songs for Aussie Kids
    - Fay White – Did You See The Wind Today?
- Best Original Soundtrack / Cast / Show Recording
  - **Various (Kate Ceberano and Wendy Matthews) – You've Always Got the Blues (songs from the ABC TV series Stringer)**
    - Various artists – Rikky and Pete (original soundtrack)
    - David Reeves – Seven Little Australians (original Australian cast)
    - Bruce Rowland – The Man from Snowy River II (original soundtrack)
    - Various artists– Boulevard of Broken Dreams (original soundtrack)

=== Artisan Awards ===
- Song of the Year
  - **Neil Finn – "Better Be Home Soon" (Crowded House)**
    - Andrew Farriss / Michael Hutchence – "Never Tear Us Apart" (INXS)
    - Robert Forster / Grant McLennan – "Streets of Your Town" (The Go-Betweens)
    - Todd Hunter / Johanna Pigott – "Age of Reason" (John Farnham)
    - Steve Kilbey / Karin Jansson – "Under The Milky Way" – (The Church)
- Producer of the Year
  - **Ross Fraser – Age of Reason – John Farnham, "When the Word Came Down" – Separate Tables and "Real Love" – The State**
    - Joe Camilleri & Jeff Burstein – Hold On To Me – The Black Sorrows
    - Charles Fisher – "That's When I Think of You" – 1927 and Fingertips – The Cockroaches
    - Simon Hussey – Edge – Daryl Braithwaite
    - Les Karski & Guy Gray – "Dark Age" – The Hippos and "Clarity of Mind" – Spy vs Spy
- Engineer of the Year
  - **Doug Brady – "Iron Lung" – Big Pig (remix), Hold Onto To Me – The Black Sorrows, Age of Reason – John Farnham, "River" – Dragon, Children of the Western World – Steve Grace, "Cars and Planes" – Machinations (remix), "Change My Sex" – Separate Tables, "When the Word Came Down" – Separate Tables, "Real Love" – The State, "So Lonely Now" – The State**
    - Jim Bonnefond – ...ish – 1927 and Fingertips – The Cockroaches
    - Guy Gray – "Dark Age" – The Hippos, "Pick You Up" – Tony Llewellyn, "Dreamworld" – Midnight Oil, "Clarity of Mind" – Spy vs Spy
    - Ian McKenzie – Chantoozies – Chantoozies
    - David Price – Groove – Eurogliders and "Home" – Noiseworks
- Best Video
  - **Richard Lowenstein – "Never Tear Us Apart" – INXS**
    - Claudia Castle – "Big Hotel" – Big Pig
    - Andrew de Groot – "Dreamworld" – Midnight Oil
    - Paul Elliott – "When You Come" – Crowded House
    - Stephen Priest & Steve Hopkins – "Age of Reason" – John Farnham
- Best Cover Art
  - **Nick Seymour – Temple of Low Men – Crowded House**
    - The Add Agency – Up from Down Under – Tommy Emmanuel
    - Bruce Goold – Wild Desert Rose – Coloured Stone
    - Phil Judd – The Sound of Trees – Schnell Fenster
    - Malpass & Burrows – Age of Reason – John Farnham
    - Robyn Stacey & Richard Allan – Lost – Died Pretty
    - Eric Weideman – ...ish – 1927

== Achievement awards ==
=== Outstanding Achievement Award ===
- INXS

== ARIA Hall of Fame inductees ==
The Hall of Fame inductees were:

- Dame Nellie Melba
- Ross Wilson

== Multiple nominations and awards ==
Artists who received multiple nominations
Nominations	Artist
11	John Farnham
10	Crowded House (Note: Including the Rikky and Pete soundtrack.)
9	1927
5	The Black Sorrows
5	Kate Ceberano (Note: Including "You're Not Alone" as a member of the supergroup Australian Olympians.)
5	INXS
4	Wendy Matthews
4	Midnight Oil
4	Kylie Minogue
4	Schnell Fenster
3	Big Pig
3	Paul Field (Note: Two as a member of the Cockroaches and "You're Not Alone" as a member of the supergroup Australian Olympians.)
3	Go 101
3	The Hippos
3	The State
2	Mary Azzopardi (Note: One as a member of Rockmelon and "You're Not Alone" as a member of the supergroup Australian Olympians.)
2	Daryl Braithwaite
2	Catfish
2	The Church
2	The Cockroaches
2	Con the Fruiterer (Note: Including one for The Comedy Company.)
2	Stephen Cummings (Note: Including the Boulevard of Broken Dreams soundtrack.)
2	Smoky Dawson and Trevor Knight (Note: Including the various artists album Australia All Over Vol. 2.)
2	Died Pretty
2	Slim Dusty
2	Tommy Emmanuel
2	Flederman
2	Flying Emus
2	Renée Geyer (Note: Contributed to the Boulevard of Broken Dreams soundtrack and "You're Not Alone" as a member of the supergroup Australian Olympians.)
2	The Go-Betweens
2	Johnny Diesel & the Injectors
2	Grace Knight (Note: One as a member of Eurogliders and "You're Not Alone" as a member of the supergroup Australian Olympians.)
2	Kylie Mole
2	John Schumann
2	Spy vs Spy
2	Dave Steel (Note: Including one as a member of Weddings Parties Anything.)
2	Sydney Symphony Orchestra (Note: Including the various artists album Tropic of Capricorn.)
2	John Williamson

Artists who received multiple awards
Wins	Artist
4	Crowded House
3	John Farnham
3	INXS
2	1927
2	Kate Ceberano
2	The State
