= Highway Corroboree =

Single by Austen Tayshus

from the album Whispering Joke
- A-side: "Highway Corroboree"
- B-side: "Rolling Stones Reunion"
- Released: January 17, 1988
- Recorded: 1987
- Label: EMI Music Australia
- Songwriter(s): Austen Tayshus, Michelle Bleicher, Trevor Farrant
- Producer(s): Michelle Bleicher, Spencer Lee

Austen Tayshus singles chronology
"The Pope Down Under" (1986)	"Highway Corroboree" (1988)	"They're Coming to Take Me Away, Ha Ha" (1988)

"Highway Corroboree" is a comedy single by Austen Tayshus. Released in January 1988 as the lead single from Austen Tayshus' second studio album, Whispering Joke. The song peaked at number 43 on the Australian charts.

At the ARIA Music Awards of 1989, the song was nominated for Best Comedy Release.

== Track listing ==
Vinyl/CD Single (EMI Music)

- Side A "Highway Corroboree"
- Side B "Rolling Stones Reunion"

== Charts ==
Chart (1988)	Position
Australian (Kent Music Report)	43
