= When the Ticklers Stopped Quivering =

Studio album by Austen Tayshus
- Released: December 1984
- Label: Regular Records

Singles from When the Ticklers Stopped Quivering
- 1. "Phantom Shuffle" Released: October 1984

When the Ticklers Stopped Quivering is the debut studio album by Australian comedian, Austen Tayshus. The album was released in December 1984 and peaked at number 72 on the Australian Kent Music Report.

== Track listing ==
Vinyl/cassette Regular Records (RRLP1211) Side one
No.	Title	Length
1.	"Introduction and Abuse"
2.	"Random Breath Testing"
3.	"More Abuse"
4.	"Senseless Violence"
5.	"McMassacre"
6.	"Ka - Ris - Ma"
7.	"Mupersan"
8.	"Nechrophilia"
9.	"Birth of Jesus"
10.	"Tracheotomy"
11.	"Last Thoughts"

Side two
No.	Title	Length
1.	"Jesus Christ for Amex"
2.	"Spaghetti Western"
3.	"Fuck This"
4.	"Back to God"
5.	"Hooked On Smack"
6.	"No Cure For Herpes"
7.	"Phantom Shuffle (Megamix)"
8.	"When the Ticklers Stopped Quivering"

== Charts ==
Chart (1984/85)	Peak position
Australian Kent Music Report	72
