= Planet of the Stereos =

Studio album by Lo-Tel
- Released: October 2000
- Recorded: April 1999
- Studio: Studios 301, Sydney, New South Wales
- Genre: Alternative music, post-grunge, indie rock
- Length: 45:54
- Label: Murmur, Epic Records Australia
- Producer: Luke Hanigan; David Lumsdaine; Keith Cleversley

Lo-Tel chronology
Planet of the Stereos (2000)	The Lost Thing (2003)

Singles from Planet of the Stereos
- 1. "Genre Casting" Released: 2000; 2. "Teenager of the Year" Released: May 2000; 3. "A Pop Song Saved My Life" Released: September 2000; 4. "Crucifix" Released: 2000

Planet of the Stereos is the debut studio album released by Australian band Lo-Tel. The album was released in October 2000 and peaked at number 41 on the ARIA Charts.

At the ARIA Music Awards of 2001, the album was nominated for the ARIA Award for Breakthrough Artist – Album; losing out to Since I Left You by The Avalanches.

== Reception ==
Professional ratings
Review scores
Source	Rating
AllMusic	3/5 stars

Johnny Loftus from AllMusic said "Lo-Tel sounds at varying times like Vertical Horizon covering Seether, or vice versa. Opener 'A Pop Song Saved My Life' is a crunchy mid-tempo rocker jazzed up with wee-oo wee-oo synths, while the single 'Teenager of the Year' opts for a thicker post-grunge sound. Those whizzy keys return for 'Genre Casting', and 'Same...' is hooky enough to make an impression beyond its slick layers of electronics and electric guitar." adding "...Fans of mature, well-crafted alt rock with a slick pop edge should pick up a copy, and impress friends who only have Goo Goo Dolls albums."

== Track listing ==
1. "A Pop Song Saved My Life" - 3:32
2. "Hudson N.Y" - 4:23
3. "Crucifix" - 3:29
4. "Teenager of the Year" - 4:30
5. "Same..." - 3:01
6. "Anytime You See Fit" - 1:05
7. "Sweet Janelle" - 3:13
8. "Fashion" - 3:52
9. "Genre Casting" - 3:20
10. "Disconnected" - 3:05
11. "An Open Letter" - 3:43
12. "Game Show Host" - 8:39
13. "Teenager of the Year (Acoustic/Instrumental Version) (Bonus Track)" -3:08

=== Enhanced CD ===
1. "Genre Casting" (video) - 3:20
2. "A Pop Song Saved My Life" (video) - 3:28
3. "Teenager of the Year" (video) - 3:23

== Charts ==
Chart (2000)	Peak position
Australian Albums (ARIA)	41

== Release history ==
Region	Date	Label	Format	Catalogue
Australia	October 2000	Murmur Records / Epic Records	CD, Compact cassette	MATTCD108
United States of America	2003	Oglio Records	CD	OGL 82022-2
