= A Pop Song Saved My Life =

Single by Lo-Tel

from the album Planet of the Stereos
- Released: September 2000
- Recorded: 1999
- Length: 3:35
- Label: Murmur
- Songwriter: Luke Hanigan
- Producers: David Lumsdaine; Luke Hanigan

Lo-Tel singles chronology
"Teenager of the Year" (2000)	"A Pop Song Saved My Life" (2000)	"Crucifix" (2000)

"A Pop Song Saved My Life" is a song by Australian band Lo-Tel. It was released in September 2000 as the third single from the band's debut studio album Planet of the Stereos. The song peaked at number 75 in Australia.

== Track listing ==
CD single (MATTCD107)

1. "A Pop Song Saved My Life" - 3:35
2. "Replaced By Vinyl" -3:52
3. "www.writersblock.com" - 3:32
4. "Teenager of the Year" (acoustic version) - 4:36
5. "Teenager of the Year" (video clip) - 4:21

== Charts ==
Chart performance for "A Pop Song Saved My Life"
Chart (2000)	Peak position
Australia (ARIA)	75
