= Phantom Shuffle =

Single by Austen Tayshus

from the album When the Ticklers Stopped Quivering
- A-side: "Phantom Shuffle"
- B-side: "The First Televised Parliament"
- Released: October 1984
- Genre: Comedy
- Length: 5:15
- Label: Regular Records
- Songwriters: Ken Mathews, Steve Johnston
- Producer: Martin Armiger

Austen Tayshus singles chronology
"Australiana" (1983)	"Phantom Shuffle" (1984)	"The Pope Down Under" (1986)

"Phantom shuffle " is a comedy single by Austen Tayshus. Released in October 1984 as the lead and only single from Austen Tayshus' debut album, When the Ticklers Stopped Quivering. The song peaked at number 16 on the Australian charts.

At the 1984 Countdown Music Awards, the song was nominated for Best Male Performance in a Video.

== Track listing ==
Vinyl (RRT 613)

- Side A "Phantom Shuffle" - 5:15
- Side B "The First Televised Parliament" - 4:50

== Charts ==
=== Weekly charts ===
Chart (1984/85)	Position
Australian (Kent Music Report)	16
