= The Spliffs =

- Origin: Townsville, Queensland
- Genres: melodic guitar pop
- Years active: 1985 - 1988
- Labels: Revolution Records

The Spliffs were an Australian pop band which formed in Townsville in 1985. They broke up in 1988 after a van crash destroyed their equipment. Their single, "Sixteen" (1988), was nominated for the ARIA Award for Best Independent Release at the ARIA Music Awards of 1989. Bass guitarist and manager, John Watson, later formed Eleven: A Music Company, and managed acts such as silverchair, Missy Higgins, and Gotye.

== History ==
The Spliffs were formed in Townsville in 1985 by university friends, Ian Christensen on lead vocals, Andrew Reid on drums, Tim Corcoran on guitar and vocals, Jamie Forsberg on lead guitar and John Watson on bass guitar. They entered a local heat of a battle of the bands competition, where they played their four-song repertoire to win. Besides original material they covered 1960s guitar pop.

The Spliffs' debut single, "You Know What They'll Say", was released in 1986, Watson recalled, "We recorded it in a garage in Kuranda, and then had to sit around glueing the sleeve covers together, the usual independent method." The group relocated to Sydney at the end of that year, where the Harbour Agency (see Michael Gudinski), "picked us up. They helped us a lot, we got a lot of gigs through them." The group issued a seven-track extended play, House of Seven, in 1987, which was produced by Alan Thorne (Hoodoo Gurus, Paul Kelly, Weddings Parties Anything).

== Band members ==
- Ian Christensen – lead vocals
- Andrew Reid – drums
- Tim Corcoran – guitar, vocals
- Jamie Forsberg – lead guitar
- John Watson – bass guitar

== Discography ==
=== Albums ===
Title	Album details
House Of Seven	Released: 1988; Label: Revolution Records (REV LP 010)

=== Singles ===
Title	Year	Album
"You Know What They'll Say"	1986	non album single
"Merry Go Round"	1987	House of Seven
"Never Say Goodbye"	1987	House of Seven
"Sixteen"	1988	non album single

== Awards and nominations ==
=== ARIA Music Awards ===
The ARIA Music Awards are a set of annual ceremonies presented by Australian Recording Industry Association (ARIA), which recognise excellence, innovation, and achievement across all genres of the music of Australia. They commenced in 1987.

Year	Nominee / work	Award	Result	Ref.
1989	"Sixteen"	Best Independent Release	Nominated	
