= Hot Rollers =

Australian band

- Years active: 1998
- Labels: Polydor
- Members: Richie Lewis; Kram

Hot Rollers are an Australian band formed by Richie Lewis (Tumbleweed) and Mark "Kram" Maher (Spiderbait). Their single "Wickerman Shoes" saw them nominated for ARIA Award for Breakthrough Artist – Single.

Their song "Something To Remember" was briefly played in an episode of Australian television series "Lockie Leonard".

== Discography ==
=== Studio albums ===
| Title | Details | Peak chart positions |
| Title | Details | AUS |
|---|---|---|
| Hot Rollers | Released: 1998; Label: Polydor (557175 2); Format: CD | - |

=== Singles ===
| Year | Title | Peak chart position | Album |
| Year | Title | AUS | Album |
|---|---|---|---|
| 1998 | "Silver Bullets" | — | Hot Rollers |
| 1998 | "Wickerman Shoes" | — | Hot Rollers |

== Awards and nominations ==
=== ARIA Music Awards ===
The ARIA Music Awards is an annual awards ceremony that recognises excellence, innovation, and achievement across all genres of Australian music. They commenced in 1987.

| Year | Nominee / work | Award | Result | Ref. |
|---|---|---|---|---|
| 1998 | "Wickerman Shoes" | Breakthrough Artist - Single | Nominated | |
