= Lo-Tel =

Australian band

- Origin: Sydney, Australia
- Genre: Pop rock
- Years active: 1998–2003
- Labels: Murmur Records, Sony Music Australia
- Past members: Luke Hanigan (1998–2003); Dave Lumsdaine (1998–2003); Darren Brollo (1998–2002); Marty Hailey (2000–2003); Paul Wheeler (2002–2003)

Lo-Tel was a pop rock band based in Sydney, Australia. They achieved commercial success and are best known for their single "Teenager of the Year" released in 2000. They no longer perform as Lo-Tel; however, two past members continue to produce music.

== History ==
In 1998, Lo-Tel were initially a trio of Luke Hanigan (singer and guitarist), Dave Lumsdaine (bass), and Darren Brollo (drums), recording tracks in Hanigan's home studio. This led to their first shows, and, with the help of John O'Donnell, they were signed to Epic Records in 1999. Hanigan said, "It was almost like we tripped and wound up with a record contract; it was so ridiculously speedy." In April 1999, Lo-Tel recorded their debut album Planet of the Stereos. Hanigan said, "We spent five weeks making it, and then six months getting it remixed by various Americans."

Their first single, "Genre Casting", was released in early 2000 on vinyl only. "Teenager of the Year" was released in May 2000 and became a Top 40 hit on the back of its appearance in the popular Australian film Looking for Alibrandi. Marty Hailey joined the band in May 2000 on 2nd guitar, keyboards, and backing vocals. Planet of the Stereos was eventually released in October 2000 and achieved moderate commercial success. Two further singles from the album, "A Pop Song Saved My Life" and "Crucifix", enjoyed a similar amount of airplay and publicity but were less successful. In March 2001, Luke Hanigan married his longtime partner, Australian actor Pia Miranda, in Las Vegas.

After a two-year break, Lo-Tel regrouped in 2002 (with Paul Wheeler replacing Brollo) and released their second album, The Lost Thing, in August 2003, with artwork by Shaun Tan. Although the album track, "Angel", received widespread commercial airplay, The Lost Thing failed to make the Top 100. The band split in 2003.

Luke Hanigan continues to write music under a solo title. David Lumsdaine has had commercial success as a production music composer. Darren Brollo is now the owner of his very own music studio The dbmusic Drum Academy, which has been highly praised as the best drum studio in the hunter region.

== Discography ==
=== Albums ===
Title	Album details	Peak chart positions
Title	Album details	AUS
Planet of the Stereos	Released: October 2000; Formats: CD; Label: Murmur/Epic Records (MATTCD108)	41
The Lost Thing	Released: August 2003; Formats: CD; Label: Murmur/Sony Music (MATTCD122)	—

=== Singles ===
Title	Year	Peak chart positions	Album
Title	Year	AUS	Album
"Genre Casting"	2000	—	Planet of the Stereos
"Teenager of the Year"	2000	34	Planet of the Stereos
"A Pop Song Saved My Life"	2000	75	Planet of the Stereos
"Crucifix"	2000		Planet of the Stereos
"Angel"	2003	50	The Lost Thing

== Awards and nominations ==
=== ARIA Music Awards ===
The ARIA Music Awards are an annual series presented by Australian Recording Industry Association (ARIA) since 1987, which recognise excellence, innovation, and achievement across all genres of Australian music.

Year	Nominee / work	Award	Result
2000	"Teenager of the Year"	Breakthrough Artist – Single	Nominated
2001	Planet of the Stereos	Breakthrough Artist – Album	Nominated
