= Trevor Knight (singer) =

Australian musician

- Genres: Country

Trevor Knight is an Australian musician. Together with Smoky Dawson he was nominated for a 1989 ARIA Award for Best Country Album for their single "High Country". The pair also won Golden Guitars in 1988 for "Days Of Old Khancoban" and 1989 for "High Country".

== Discography ==
=== Albums ===
Title	Details
Sail Away	Released: 1978; Label: RCA Victor (VPL1 0167)
Spirit of the Green and Gold	Released: 1985; Label: Powderworks (POW 6107)
High Country (with Smoky Dawson)	Released: October 1988; Label: EMI (EMC 791266)
The Times They Are A'Changing (as Trevor Knight & The Newport Trio)	Released: 1991; Label: Pickwick Music (PKD 3189)
Across the Miles	Released: November 2003; Label: Shoestring Records Australia (SR52)
Spirit of the Eagle Rocky Mountain Echoes	Released: 2004; Label: Trevor Knight
Favourable Winds	Released: 2006; Label: Shoestring Records Australia (SR68)
The Ones that Got Away	Released: 2017; Label: Trevor Knight

== Awards ==
=== ARIA Music Awards ===
The ARIA Music Awards are a set of annual ceremonies presented by Australian Recording Industry Association (ARIA), which recognise excellence, innovation, and achievement across all genres of the music of Australia. They commenced in 1987.

Year	Nominee / work	Award	Result	Ref.
1989	High Country (with Smokey Dawson)	ARIA Award for Best Country Album	Nominated	

=== Country Music Awards of Australia ===
The Country Music Awards of Australia (CMAA) (also known as the Golden Guitar Awards) is an annual awards night held in January during the Tamworth Country Music Festival, celebrating recording excellence in the Australian country music industry. They have been held annually since 1973.

Year	Nominee / work	Award	Result
1988	"The Days Of Old Khancoban" Smoky Dawson & Trevor Knight's Newport Trio	Heritage Award	Won
1989	"High Country" Smoky Dawson & Trevor Knight	Vocal Group or Duo of the Year	Won

- Note: wins only
