= Go 101 =

- Years active: 1987 - 1990
- Labels: Mercury; Polygram
- Members: David Wilson; Daniel Alan; Steven Brooks; Simon Kershaw; Peter Badenoch; James Allmand

Go 101 was a Melbourne-based funk/pop band formed by David Wilson and Daniel Alan of the band Hue & Cry. Their debut single "Build It Up" saw them nominated for three awards at the ARIA Music Awards of 1989.

The band made a guest appearance in the Australian soap opera Neighbours on 8 May 1990. They played their single "Message (To a Broken Heart)" during a music appreciation class at Erinsborough High. Wilson also appeared in scenes with Melanie Pearson, played by Lucinda Cowden.

== Band members ==
- David Wilson – keyboards, vocals
- Daniel Alan – drums
- Steven Brooks – guitar
- Peter Badenoch – bass
- Simon Kershaw – keyboards
- James Allmand – keyboards

== Discography ==
=== Studio albums ===
Title	Details	Peak chart positions
Title	Details	AUS
Tempting Fate	Released: November 1989; Label: Mercury/Poyldor (841357-1 / 841357-2); Format: CD, LP	73

=== Singles ===
Year	Title	Chart positions	Album
Year	Title	AUS	Album
1988	"Build It Up"	55	Tempting Fate
1989	"Room for Love"	88	Tempting Fate
1989	"Jealous Heart"	66	Tempting Fate
1990	"Message (To a Broken Heart)"	131	Tempting Fate

== Awards ==
=== ARIA Music Awards ===
The ARIA Music Awards is an annual awards ceremony held by the Australian Recording Industry Association. Go 101 were nominated for three awards.

Year	Nominee / work	Award	Result
1989	"Build It up"	Best New Talent	Nominated
1989	"Build It up"	Breakthrough Artist – Single	Nominated
1989	"Build It up"	Highest Selling Single	Nominated
