= The Hippos (Australian band) =

Australian blues band

- Origin: Sydney, New South Wales, Australia
- Genres: Blues and Roots
- Years active: 1986–1990s
- Labels: Stoat Records, WEA, Exile Records
- Past members: Leszek Karski; John Power; Ace Follington; Ian Jones; Bridie King; David McBride; Nigel Harris; Tim Reeves; Matt Morrison; Rory McKibbon; Phil Groves

The Hippos were an Australian blues band formed in Sydney in 1985. The band released three albums in their time together and were nominated for three ARIA Music Awards at the ARIA Music Awards of 1989 for their song "Dark Age"

== Band members ==
The original band members included:

- Leszek (Lez) Karski – guitar, lead vocals. (Left to join the Bondi Cigars.)
- John Power – bass, lead vocals.
- Ace Follington – drums. (Left to join the Bondi Cigars.)
- Ian Jones – saxophone, percussion, backing vocals.
- Bridie King – keyboards, percussion, backing vocals.

Other musicians included:

- David McBride – trombone. (Hippocracy)
- Nigel Harris – trumpet. (Hippocracy)
- Tim Reeves – drums.
- Matt Morrison – drums.
- Rory McKibbon – guitar.
- Phil Groves – keyboards.

== Discography ==
=== Studio albums ===
Title	Album details	Peak chart positions
Title	Album details	AUS
Hippocracy	Released: June 1988; Label: WEA (255526-1, 255526-2); Format: CD, LP	55
Hippocalypse	Released: September 1989; Label: WEA (256713-1, 256713-2); Format: CD, LP	101
Creatures from the Back Saloon	Released: August 1993; Label: Exile / Festival (D31060); Format: CD	139

=== Extended plays ===
Title	Details
Mammal on the Move	Released: 1986; Label: Stoat Records (STOAT EP1); Format: LP

=== Singles ===
Title	Year	Peak chart positions	Album
Title	Year	AUS	Album
"Breaking Up Somebody's Home"	1988	—	Hippocracy
"Dark Age"	1988	45	Hippocracy
"Time and Motion"	1989	128	Hippocalypse
"Eat at Home"	1990	—	Hippocalypse

== Awards ==
The ARIA Music Awards is an annual awards ceremony that recognises excellence, innovation, and achievement across all genres of Australian music. The Hippos were nominated for three awards.

Year	Nominee / work	Award	Result
1989	"Dark Age"	Breakthrough Artist – Single	Nominated
1989	Les Karski & Guy Gray for "Dark Age"	Producer of the Year	Nominated
1989	Guy Gray for "Dark Age"	Engineer of the Year	Nominated
