= Dark Age (song) =

1998 song by the Australian blues group The Hippos

Single by The Hippos

from the album Hippocracy
- B-side: "Rodent Operative"
- Released: 30 May 1988
- Recorded: December 1987/January 1988
- Studio: Rhinoceros Studios
- Genre: Rock, power pop
- Length: 4:23
- Label: WEA
- Songwriter(s): Les Karski
- Producer(s): Les Karski & Guy Gray

The Hippos singles chronology
"Breaking Up Somebody's Home" (1988)	"Dark Age" (1988)	"Time and Motion" (1989)

"Dark Age" is a song by Australian blues group, The Hippos. The song was released on 30 May 1988 as the second and final single from the group's debut studio album, Hippocracy. "Dark Age" peaked at 45 in Australia.

At the ARIA Music Awards of 1989, the song was nominated for three awards; Breakthrough Artist – Single, Producer of the Year (Les Karski & Guy Gray) and Engineer of the Year (Guy Gray).

== Track listing ==
7" Single (7-258002)

1. "Dark Age"
2. "Rodent Operative"

== Charts ==
Chart (1988)	Peak position
Australia (ARIA)	45
