= Smoky Dawson =

Australian country music entertainer

Smoky Dawson AM MBE
- Dawson astride Flash at his ranch, Terrey Hills, August 1962

Background information
- Also known as: Herbert Henry Dawson
- Born: Herbert Henry Brown; 19 March 1913; Collingwood, Victoria, Australia
- Died: 13 February 2008 (aged 94) Sydney, New South Wales, Australia
- Genres: Western, folk, country
- Occupations: Musician; singer-songwriter; guitarist; radio presenter; television presenter
- Instruments: Vocals; steel-string acoustic guitar; harmonica; piano accordion
- Years active: 1932–2005 (professionally)
- Labels: Fidelity records, Columbia
- Formerly of: The Coral Island Boys; Smoky and the Pepsodent Rangers; Smokey and His Boys; Smokey and the Five Star Rangers; Slim Dusty; Tex Morton; Buddy Williams; Glen Campbell

Smoky Dawson (19 March 1913 – 13 February 2008), born as Herbert Henry Brown, was an Australian singer-songwriter and musician, who performed western and folk music with a tinge of country, he was a radio and television presenter and entertainer. He was widely touted as Australia's first singing cowboy complete with acoustic steel string guitar and yodel, in the style of Americans Gene Autry and Roy Rogers.

Dawson began performing professionally in 1932 and released his last album in 2005, aged 92. Through his high-rating syndicated radio serials (at their height broadcast on 100 stations), The Adventures of Smoky Dawson, as well as television appearances, comic books and songs, he created the persona of a happy-go-lucky singing cowboy.

Dawson did his own version of the western standard "Wild Colonial Boy", rewriting the words and music with American country singer Glen Campbell.

Dawson also met The Kelly Family, and wrote a ditty about Jim Kelly, the brother of Ned Kelly.

== Family ==
Dawson was born as Herbert Henry Brown on 19 March 1913 in Collingwood, Victoria. His father, Parker Frederick Peter Brown (21 November 1884 – 1957), was a labourer of Irish descent; his mother, Olive "Amy" Muir (ca. 1880 – June 1919), was of Scottish descent. His parents married in 1905, and they had five children, Leslie Muir Wood "Les" (1904–1920), Laura Olive Emily (1906–1941), Peter Frederick James (1908–1972), Herbert Henry "Herbie", and Edward Parker Peter "Ted" (aka Ted Dawson) (1915–1978).

The Browns initially lived in Melbourne and briefly moved to the rural area of Warrnambool. His father, Parker, also worked in a dispensary, and had performed as a baritone under the name Frederick Parker, at the Bijou, a theatre in Melbourne. Parker had studied as a medical student before serving in World War I.

Parker Dawson enlisted in the Australian Army in June 1915 and fought at Gallipoli from October until January 1916 and also served in Borneo. He was diagnosed with neurasthenia and was honourably discharged in August 1916 on medical grounds. Dawson later remembered, "[m]y dad went to Gallipoli ... but unfortunately he suffered a lot from it and so did the family". In June 1919 his mother, Amy, died of unspecified causes and the following year his brother, Les, died by drowning on Christmas Day. By that time his father had remarried. Smoky marched every year in the annual Anzac Day marches, right up until his death.

== Early life ==
Dawson's early life was unsettled, as his father Parker was prone to heavy drinking and violence, he repeatedly ran away from home after his beatings. Once he was nearly choked to death, ran off and, after being caught, he was chained in a dog's tent by his father. From the age of eight or nine he was "making up little ditties" which soothed him. At about nine-years-old, Dawson was so severely beaten that he ran away from home again. He travelled to his mother's family, the Muirs, in Melbourne and was sent, by a court order, to live for three years at the St. Vincent de Paul Boys' Orphanage, in South Melbourne. It was administered by the Catholic Church's Christian Brothers, and Dawson was baptised in that faith and took the confirmation name, Aidan. For school holidays he was sent to a farm in Eurack near Colac, run by the Carews. He had learned to sing at the orphanage and Jack Carew taught him to play the harmonica and piano accordion. At the age of thirteen Dawson left the orphanage to join his older brother, Peter, working on a farm at Stewarton (about 8 miles (13 km) from Goorambat). Each Saturday night he would sing at the local town hall with a repertoire that included "Funiculi, Funicula", "Little Brown Cottage" and "Good Morning, Good Morning".

== Music and performing career ==
In 1932 Smoky Dawson worked at a tannery and on weekends he played a lap steel guitar in a duo, The Coral Island Boys, with his younger brother, Ted, on Spanish guitar. Both sang lead vocals, with Ted's singing described by Dawson as "a much richer voice than mine. He had more depth in his voice". They performed then-popular songs, such as "Gee But I'm Lonesome for You Caroline" and "Southern Moon Keep on Shining". In 1934, Dawson formed a Western group with an accordionist, a bass guitarist, and Malcolm on violin; which cut a test acetate at Fidelity Records with Jack Murray recording. It was the first professional use of Dawson's nickname, "Smoky" – he had tried pipe smoking when living at Stewarton but it had sickened him. The recording led to sponsorship by Pepsodent – a toothpaste company – and so the group were named, Smoky and the Pepsodent Rangers. In 1935 they were the first Western group to be broadcast live on an Australian radio station, 3KZ, and by 1937 Dawson had his own radio show. His show was re-broadcast into New South Wales on 2CH as "Hill-billy Artists" by "Smoky" Dawson and His Boys. In 1941, he signed with Columbia Records, where he recorded his first commercial releases, including "I'm a Happy Go Lucky Cowhand" and "The Range in the Western Sky". He also toured around Australia.

Dawson had used music as a way of comforting himself and during World War II he took this talent to boost the morale of others. In 1939 upon the outbreak of the war he had attempted to enlist, but was rejected on medical grounds for a "bumpy heart". In 1940, with Smoky Dawson's Five-Star Rangers, he would perform at soldier's socials. In 1941 when the Japanese forces approached Australia, he enlisted as a non-combatant nursing orderly and was commandeered by the First Australian Army Entertainment Unit. On 13 March 1944, while still in the army, he married Florence "Dot" Cheers (12 October 1906 – 27 October 2010), an elocution teacher – they had met nine years earlier when both worked in radio. Western Mail's Louis Clark, described Dawson as an "Australian outback songster" and the unit as "an array of genius". Aside from music, Dawson would also perform at rodeos, circuses and country shows demonstrating his skill at knife-throwing using machetes, commando knives, tomahawks, or two-edged axes. By October 1949, Dawson had recorded about 60 tracks from his songbook of 280 tunes – all of them "have a cowboy setting—with a dash of romance". Dawson travelled around Australia for eight months a year while Dot remained behind as Auntie June on her own radio show for 3KZ.

Dot and Smoky Dawson, Adelaide, November 1952

In March 1951 Dawson, as a cowboy entertainer, narrated a documentary film, directed by Rudall Hayward, on Australian rough riders at a Kyabram rodeo, which was to be broadcast on United States TV. Dawson sang a self-written song praising their skills and noted "there's nothing half-baked about Australian rodeos or the boys who ride in them. They're entitled to all the credit we can give them ... Rodeos and rough riders are just as much a part of our national heritage as symphonies and seascapes". In June that year Dawson and Dot travelled to the US where he played and recorded demos in Nashville. While in New Jersey, he took the role of Petruchio in a stage version of the musical, Kiss Me, Kate. His trip to the US was cut short after he was injured in a car crash in Chattanooga, Tennessee; while driving to Shreveport, Louisiana, for an invitation to appear on Louisiana Hayride hosted by Jim Reeves, Dawson absent-mindedly ran a red light and his car was hit by a Cadillac going the opposite direction; he was hospitalised and his appearance on Louisiana Hayride never eventuated. When Dawson returned to Australia in September 1952 he was hailed as an "Australian singing 'cowboy' who has made good in the US at the expense of the world's best". For trick riding his palomino horse, Flash (1951–1982), was bedecked in American-style tack rather than Australian. Flash lived to be 31 years old and Dawson supplemented his feed by giving him porridge with a spoon.

== The Adventures of Smoky Dawson radio show ==
Echoing US singing cowboy, Roy Rogers, on 8 December 1952 Dawson starred in his own radio show, The Adventures of Smoky Dawson, which stayed on the air for ten years until 1962.

At its peak, Dawson's show was broadcast on 69 stations across the country. Dot also had her own radio shows for children. A related comic book of the same name was published from 1953 to 1962 and both featured "Dawson's persona [which] became 'Australia's favourite cowboy', with his faithful sidekick Jingles, his horse Flash and their young friend Billy fighting the evil outlaw Grogan, adhering to Smoky's 'code of the west', pausing for a song, a moral and sometimes a bowl of cornflakes, courtesy of the program's sponsor". For the radio show Dawson provided "rendition[s] of a magpie, kookaburra, rooster, turkey, pig, cow, an impatient horse, a posse with bloodhounds (with the bandit being shot), a pack of dogs fighting and next door's dog howling in the middle of the night". In 1957 he founded the Smoky Dawson Ranch on 26 acres (11 ha) farm at Ingleside as a venue to host country music shows, a horse riding school and a holiday camp for children.

== Television ==
In 1974 a TV series, Luke's Kingdom, was shot at Dawson's ranch. The following year he featured on This Is Your Life hosted by Mike Willesee.

In 1988 he appeared in two episodes of TV soap opera, A Country Practice, as a drifter, "Charlie McKeahnie", who passes through the fictional location of Wandin Valley and proposes to town gossip, "Esme Watson" (portrayed by Joyce Jacobs). His performance was so popular with viewers that he made another appearance the following year. Dawson was a Freemason.

== Death ==
In his later years Smoky Dawson was diagnosed with arthritis, emphysema and two hernias. In June 2000 he was knocked down by a hit-and-run driver and had spinal injuries. As of 2004 he and Dot presented a radio show on 2NSB and lived in Lane Cove. Herbert Henry "Smoky" Dawson died on 13 February 2008 after a short illness, aged 94. He was survived by his wife, Florence "Dot" Dawson, an elocutionist, radio actress and presenter, who died on 27 October 2010 at 104 years of age. In a 2005 interview Dawson indicated how he would like to be remembered, "Ah well, just as Herb. Just as one who's tried his best, he's carried out, lover of his country and always thought about the good things in life. Being honest and true to yourself, the main thing, true to yourself. And ah, I think to be remembered as an old friend".

== Awards and legacy ==
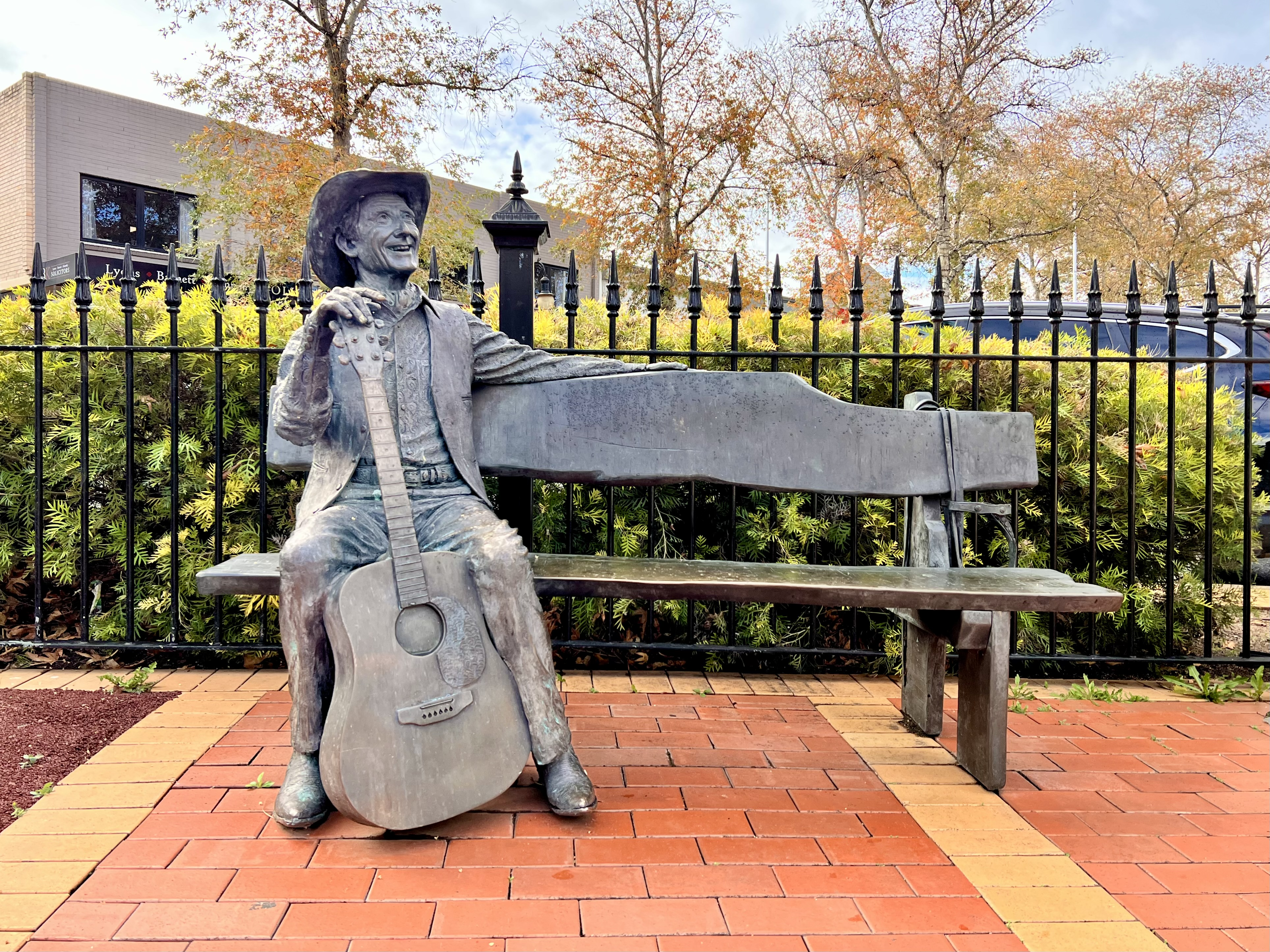
Smoky Dawson Bronze Statue, Tamworth, New South Wales

Smoky Dawson continued his long career of recording and performing after his radio show, and enjoyed performing until his death. He has frequently been recognised for his contributions to music and entertainment.

On 31 December 1982 Dawson was awarded an Order of the British Empire – Member (Civil) with the citation, "In recognition of service to country music".

In 1978 Dawson was inducted into the Australian Roll of Renown.

In 1985 he published his autobiography, Smoky Dawson: A Life. An updated and expanded addition was released in 2021.

In the 1999 Australia Day Honours Dawson was made a Member of the Order of Australia with the citation, "In recognition of service to country music".

In 2005 he was inducted into the Australian Record Industry Association Hall of Fame. In April 2007 he donated his first electric guitar to the Australian Stockman's Hall of Fame.

Smoky's Bar and Grill was opened in his name in 2005 at the West Diggers Club in Tamworth – he attended with Dot. His recording career spanned more than six decades, his last album, Homestead of My Dreams, was released in 2005.

Powerhouse Museum described him as "a singer, showman, songwriter, scriptwriter, knife and double-headed axe thrower and all round performer who has lived a long life entertaining audiences. Through his radio serials, comic books and songs he created the persona of a happy-go-lucky singing cowboy". From 2001 the museum has displayed his signed copy of the comic book, The Adventures of Smoky Dawson, and other memorabilia, which was subsequently donated by Dawson in 2004.

Near Dawson's former ranch in Terrey Hills is the "Smoky Dawson Pavilion", a multi-purpose hall (containing a full-sized basketball court) situated within Galstaun College at Ingleside. Smoky Dawson Pavilion opened in late 2014 with money from the estate of Dawson and Dot.

=== Australian Roll of Renown ===
The Australian Roll of Renown honours Australian and New Zealander musicians who have shaped the music industry by making a significant and lasting contribution to Country Music. It was inaugurated in 1976 and the inductee is announced at the Country Music Awards of Australia in Tamworth in January.

Year	Nominee / work	Award	Result
1978	Smoky Dawson	Australian Roll of Renown	inductee

=== ARIA Music Awards ===
The ARIA Music Awards is an annual awards ceremony that recognises excellence, innovation, and achievement across all genres of Australian music. They commenced in 1987. Dawson was inducted into the Hall of Fame in 2005.

Year	Nominee / work	Award	Result
1989	High Country (with Trevor Knight)	Best Country Album	Nominated
2005	Smoky Dawson	ARIA Hall of Fame	inductee

=== Country Music Awards of Australia ===
The Country Music Awards of Australia (CMAA) (also known as the Golden Guitar Awards) is an annual awards night held in January during the Tamworth Country Music Festival, celebrating recording excellence in the Australian country music industry. They have been held annually since 1973.

In 1988 Dawson and Trevor Knight won The Heritage Golden Guitar at the Country Music Awards of Australia for "The Days of Old Khancoban" – written by Dawson about the droving days of his youth in the Snowy Mountains. The following year Dawson and Knight won a second Golden Guitar for their song, "High Country", as Best Vocal Duo or Group.

Year	Nominee / work	Award	Result
1977	himself	Hands of Fame	imprint
1988	"The Days of Old Khancoban" Smoky Dawson & Trevor Knight's Newport Trio	Heritage Award	Won
1989	"High Country" Smoky Dawson & Trevor Knight	Vocal Group or Duo of the Year	Won

- Note: wins only

=== Mo Awards ===
The Australian Entertainment Mo Awards (commonly known informally as the Mo Awards), were annual Australian entertainment industry awards. They recognise achievements in live entertainment in Australia from 1975 to 2016. Smoky Dawson won one award in that time

Year	Nominee / work	Award	Result (wins only)
2007	Smoky Dawson	Outstanding Contribution to Country Music	awarded

=== Tamworth Songwriters Awards ===
The Tamworth Songwriters Association (TSA) is an annual songwriting contest for original country songs, awarded in January at the Tamworth Country Music Festival. They commenced in 1986. Smoky Dawson won four awards.

Year	Nominee / work	Award	Result (wins only)
1987	Smoky Dawson	Song of the Year Award	Won
1989	Smoky Dawson	Traditional Bush Ballad Award	Won
1990	Smoky Dawson	Songmaker Award	awarded
1997	Smoky Dawson	Tex Morton Award	awarded

== Bibliography ==
- Smoky, Dawson (1985). Smoky Dawson : a life. Illustrated by Pro Hart, Introduction by R. M. Williams. Sydney: Allen & Unwin. ISBN 978-0-86861-774-9.
