= Angel (Lo-Tel song) =

Single by Lo-Tel

from the album The Lost Thing
- Released: August 2003
- Recorded: 2003
- Label: Murmur
- Songwriter(s): Luke Hanigan
- Producer(s): Keith Cleversley

Lo-Tel singles chronology
"Crucifix" (2001)	"Angel" (2003)

"Angel" is a song by Australian band Lo-Tel. It was released in August 2003 as the lead and only single from the band's second studio album The Lost Thing. The song peaked at number 50 in Australia. It was the band's final release.

== Track listing ==
CD single (MATTCD131)

1. "Angel"
2. "Complacent Yet Anxious" (live)
3. "Insomniac"
4. "Crucifix" (alternate version)

== Charts ==
"Angel" debuted at number 53, becoming the band's highest debuting single. It peaked at number 50 in September 2003.

Chart (2003)	Peak position
Australia (ARIA)	50
