= You're Not Alone (Australian Olympians song) =

Single by Australian Olympians
- Released: 18 April 1988
- Recorded: Rhinoceros Studios, Sydney
- Genre: pop
- Length: 5:15
- Label: CBS
- Songwriters: Rob Hirst; Angry Anderson; Bernie Lynch; Mal Logan; John Schumann
- Producer: Mark Moffatt

"You're Not Alone" is a song released as the Australian official Olympic Team Song in 1988. It was credited to Australian Olympians which was made up of a selection of Australian rock and pop singers, television and radio announcers and olympic athletes. Profits from the sale of the record went towards the Australian Olympic Federation. The song peaked at number 18 in Australia in May 1988.

At the ARIA Music Awards of 1989, the song was nominated for 'Highest Selling Single', losing to "I Should Be So Lucky" by Kylie Minogue. The song was spoofed on an episode of The Comedy Company as We're Staying Home, performed by unfit suburban characters singing about watching the Olympics on television and eating fast food.

== Artists involved ==
Angry Anderson, Julie Anthony, Mary Azzopardi, Basia Bonkowski, Ian Belton, Daryl Braithwaite, Neil Brooks, Kate Ceberano, Jonathan Coleman, Tommy Emmanuel, Jon English, The Fabulous Singlettes, Paul Field, Renée Geyer, Michael Horrocks, Grace Knight, Brian Mannix, Norman May, Keren Minshull, Sam McNally, Mark Meyer, Mark Moffatt, Rick Price, Ian Rogerson, Vince Sorrenti, John Schumann, Richard Wilkins and Ross Wilson

== Track listing ==
CD Single (CBS 651556-7)

1. "You're Not Alone" - 5:15
2. "You're Not Alone" (Instrumental) - 5:15

== Charts ==
Chart (1988)	Peak position
Australia (ARIA)	18
