= Teenager of the Year (song) =

2000 single by Lo-Tel

Single by Lo-Tel

from the album Planet of the Stereos
- Released: May 2000
- Recorded: 1999
- Length: 4:30
- Label: Murmur
- Songwriter(s): Luke Hanigan
- Producer(s): Keith Cleversley

Lo-Tel singles chronology
"Genre Casting" (2000)	"Teenager of the Year" (2000)	"A Pop Song Saved My Life" (2000)

"Teenager of the Year" is a song by Australian band Lo-Tel. It was released in May 2000 as the second single from the band's debut studio album Planet of the Stereos. The song peaked at number 34 in Australia. At the ARIA Music Awards of 2000, the song was nominated for the ARIA Award for Breakthrough Artist – Single, losing out to "Don't Call Me Baby" by Madison Avenue.

== Track listing ==
Australian CD single (MATTCD102)

1. "Teenager of the Year" – 4:30
2. "Genre Casting" – 3:19
3. "Lessons in Spanish" – 1:06
4. "Looking for Alibrandi" (trailer) (video) – 2:06

== Charts ==
Chart (2000)	Peak position
Australia (ARIA)	34
