= Tropic of Capricorn (album) =

Compilation album
- Released: 1988
- Recorded: 1985–1987
- Genre: Orchestral music
- Length: 70 min
- Label: Australian Music Centre, in collaboration with ABC

Tropic of Capricorn is a compilation album of orchestral music. Subtitled Orchestral Music by Queensland Composers, the album has 5 tracks each composed by a different composer who had either worked or studied in Queensland. The album was nominated for 1989 ARIA Award for Best Classical Album.

== Track listing ==
1. Bacchanals (Wilfred Lehmann)
2. Garotte (Andrew Schultz)
3. Nadja (Gerard Brophy)
4. Bamaga diptych (Richard Mills)
5. Oboe concertino (Colin Brumby)

== Personnel ==
Orchestras
Queensland Symphony Orchestra (tracks 1,2,4,5)
Sydney Symphony Orchestra (3)
Queensland Theatre Orchestra (4)

Conductors
Wilfred Lehmann (1,5)
Robert Boughen (2)
Myer Fredman (3)
Richard Mills (4)

Additional
Barry Davis - oboe (5)
