= 1927 (band) =

Australian pop-rock band

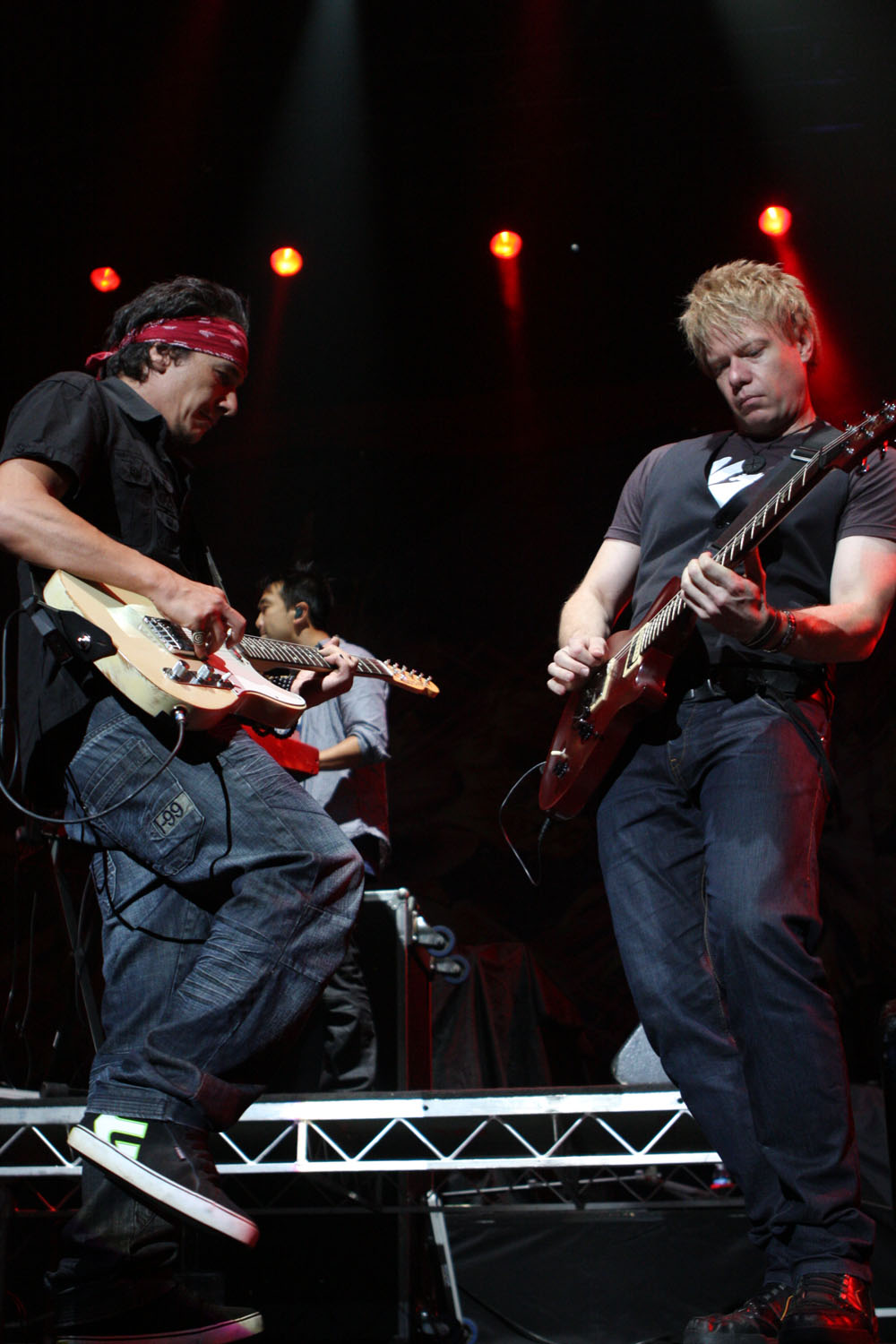
- 1927 performing, Sydney Entertainment Centre, February 2012; Eric Weideman at left Craig Laird (right)

Background information
- Origin: Melbourne, Australia
- Genres: Pop rock; soft rock
- Years active: 1987–1993; 2009–present
- Labels: Trafalgar; WEA; EastWest; Atlantic
- Members: Eric Weideman
- Past members: James Barton; Bill Frost; Garry Frost; Charlie Cole; Dave Dwyer; Phil Campbell; Simon Shapiro; Damien Cooper; Craig Laird
- Website: www.1927.net.au

1927 is an Australian pop rock band formed in 1987. The original lineup consisted of James Barton (drums), Billy Frost (bass guitar), his brother Garry Frost (guitar, keyboards), and Eric Weideman (vocals, guitar, keyboards). The band achieved mainstream success in the late 1980s and early 1990s with several hit songs.

Their debut album, ...ish (1988), was a commercial success, reaching multi-platinum status, peaking at No. 1 on the Australian ARIA albums chart. It produced the hit single "That's When I Think of You", peaking at No. 6 on the Australian singles charts. At the 1989 ARIA Music Awards, the band won Breakthrough Artist – Album for ...ish and Breakthrough Artist – Single for "That's When I Think of You."

Their second studio album, The Other Side (1990), continued their success. At the 1990 ARIA Music Awards, they won Best Video for "Compulsory Hero" directed by Geoffrey Barter.

In 1992, the group released a third studio album, 1927, which reached the top 40. However, they disbanded the following year. In 2009, Weideman reformed 1927 with a new lineup.

== History ==
=== 1984–1987: Formation ===
In 1984 guitarist and keyboardist Garry Frost had left Sydney-based pop rockers, Moving Pictures, after their second album, Matinée. Frost had co-written Moving Pictures' 1981 number-one hit "What About Me?". In late 1986 Frost was writing songs at his home studio for an unformed band project. In 1987, he was watching Nine Network's variety series Hey Hey It's Saturday's talent segment "Red Faces" when Erik Weideman appeared and performed a cover of The Police's hit single, "Roxanne". Garry drove from Sydney to Melbourne, about 880 km (550 mi), to recruit Weideman on lead vocals, guitar, and keyboards. Prior to joining 1927 Weideman had played in various cover bands including, Mixed Feelings, before starting a brief solo career. He later recalled, "I had only just started performing on my own. I was playing at a pub in Melbourne ... Then a friend of mine dared me to go on 'Red Faces'". The pair were joined by Garry's brother Bill Frost on bass guitar and James Barton on drums and the band 1927 were officially formed. The band's name, 1927, was drawn from a hat of suggestions and was from a favourite saying by Garry, "I haven't done that since 1927".

=== 1988–1989:...ish ===
After a year of seeking a recording contract, 1927 were signed by Charles Fisher for his label, Trafalgar Productions in 1988. With Fisher producing, the group recorded their debut single, "That's When I Think of You", which was released in July 1988 and peaked at No. 6 on the ARIA Singles Chart in September 1988. In October 1988 the band released their second single, "If I Could", which peaked at No. 4. In mid-November their debut album, ...ish was released. Rock music historian, Ian McFarlane, described it as "brimful of stirring, stately pop rock anthems". It peaked at No. 1 on the ARIA Albums Chart for four weeks and stayed in the Top 50 for 46 weeks. It was awarded 5× platinum certification – for shipment of more than 350,000 copies. As of 2002, it was in the top 10 of the most successful debut albums by Australian artists.

Two more top 20 singles from the album followed in 1989; "You'll Never Know" and "Compulsory Hero". In 1989 "That's When I Think of You" was released internationally, it peaked in the Top 50 on the United Kingdom Singles Chart, and just reached the United States Billboard Hot 100. At the ARIA Music Awards of 1989, 1927 won 'Breakthrough Artist – Single' for "That's When I Think of You" and 'Breakthrough Artist – Album' for ...ish. At the 1990 ceremony they won 'Best Video' for "Compulsory Hero", which was directed by Geoff Barter. The band added Charlie Cole on keyboards (ex-Moving Pictures) and toured Australia in support of the album and associated singles. By late 1989, they started work for their second album when Garry Frost announced he was leaving the band earlier the following year.

=== 1990–1993: The Other Side and 1927 ===
1927's founder Garry Frost was replaced by Dave Dwyer on guitars, keyboards and the band recorded The Other Side with Weideman as main songwriter, and Fisher and Garry producing. The Other Side, which peaked at No. 3 in July 1990, provided a Top 20 hit with "Tell Me a Story". McFarlane described the album as "full of lush, ambitious arrangements and well-crafted pop, but it lacked the charm and rousing choruses" of ...Ish". Barton left in 1992 to be replaced on drums by Phillip Campbell, and in November they released their eponymous third album, 1927 produced by Mark Opitz. 1927 reached the Top 40 and the lead single, "Scars", reached the Top 50 but the second single, "It Ain't Love", was less successful. 1927 were suffering financial and internal problems and disbanded in 1993.

=== 1994–2008: The Very Best of 1927 ===
In October 1996, a compilation album, The Very Best of 1927, was released, which included Weideman's debut solo single, "Nothing I Can’t Do". "Nothing I Can Do" peaked at No. 73 in Australia in 1997. Subsequently, Weideman performed as a solo artist.

1927 played various exclusive shows including the Here and Now '80s revival tour in the early 2000s, Weideman also continued with his solo career.

=== 2009–2018: Generation-i ===
In September 2009 the group re-issued ...ish as a digitally remastered edition featuring bonus live recordings of "Propaganda Machine" and "Compulsory Hero". The band, led by Weideman, reformed with Damien Cooper on drums, Craig Laird on lead guitar and backing vocals, and Simon Shapiro on bass guitar and backing vocals. On 15 June 2009 the band appeared on Mornings with Kerry-Anne and toured Australia during the latter half of the year into the start of 2010. In March they supported Simple Minds and followed in June with the second leg of the 20...ish Anniversary Tour.

In mid to late 2012, 1927 supported Roxette on the Australian leg of their Charm School tour and commenced pre-release orders for their forthcoming new studio album. In June, 1927 commenced their Generation-i Tour across the Australian east coast. In July 2013, The Essential 1927 was released and peaked at number 96. Generation-i was officially released through Sony in August 2013. A limited edition DVD featuring performances from the Roxette tour was included with the CD.

=== 2019: Paper Aeroplane ===
In October 2019, 1927 released a three-track EP, titled Paper Aeroplane, and supported its release with an Australian tour.

Laird left the band in 2022 after 12 years; he was the second-longest serving member of 1927 behind Erik Weideman.

== Members ==
=== Current members ===
- Erik Weideman (born 1964) – lead vocals, guitar, keyboards, drums (1987–present)

=== Former members ===
- James Barton – drums, backing vocals (1987–1992)
- Bill Frost – bass guitar, backing vocals (1987–1993)
- Garry Frost – guitar, keyboards, backing vocals (1987–1990)
- Charlie Cole – keyboards, backing vocals (1989–1992)
- David Dwyer – guitar, backing vocals, keyboards (1990–1993)
- Phillip Campbell – drums (1992–1993)
- Adam Warnock - Guitar and Backing Vocals (1999-2001)
- Simon Shapiro – bass guitar, backing vocals (2009–2019)
- Damien Cooper – drums (2009–2019)
- Craig Laird – lead guitar, backing vocals (2009–2022)

== Discography ==
=== Studio albums ===
List of studio albums, with selected chart positions and certifications
Title	Details	Peak chart positions		Certifications (sales threshold)
Title	Details	AUS	NZ	Certifications (sales threshold)
...ish	Released: 14 November 1988; Label: Trafalgar Productions (2354032), Atlantic Records (781986-2); Formats: LP, cassette, CD, digital download, streaming	1	35	AUS: 5× Platinum
The Other Side	Released: 16 July 1990; Label: Trafalgar Productions (9031-71369-2), Atlantic Records (82136-2); Formats: LP, cassette, CD, digital download, streaming	3	—	AUS: Platinum
1927	Released: 16 November 1992; Label: Trafalgar Productions (450991249-2); Formats: CD, digital download, streaming	40	—	
Generation-i	Released: 9 August 2013; Label: Alberts/SME (88883757302); Formats: CD, CD/DVD, digital download, streaming	100	—	
"—" denotes a recording that did not chart or was not released in that territory.

=== Compilation albums ===
List of compilation albums, with selected chart positions
Title	Details	Peak chart positions
Title	Details	AUS
The Very Best of 1927	Released: 7 October 1996; Label: EastWest Records/WEA (0630164952); Formats: Cassette, CD	—
The Essential 1927	Released: 21 June 2013; Label: Alberts/Sony Music Australia (88883713962); Formats: CD, digital download	94
"—" denotes a recording that did not chart or was not released in that territory.

=== Extended plays ===
List of extended plays
Title	Details
Paper Aeroplane	Released: 15 November 2019; Label: Self-released; Formats: Digital download, streaming

=== Singles ===
Year	Title	Peak chart positions			Album
Year	Title	AUS	UK	US	Album
1988	"That's When I Think of You"	6	46	100	...ish
1988	"If I Could"	4	101	—	...ish
1989	"You'll Never Know"	15	—	—	...ish
1989	"Compulsory Hero"	14	—	—	...ish
1989	"To Love Me"	70	—	—	...ish
1990	"Tell Me a Story"	17	—	—	The Other Side
1990	"Don't Forget Me"	42	—	—	The Other Side
1990	"The Other Side"	83	—	—	The Other Side
1992	"Scars"	46	—	—	1927
1993	"It Ain't Love"	123	—	—	1927
2013	"Stop the World"	—	—	—	Generation-i
2013	"The Story Never Ends"	—	—	—	Generation-i
"—" denotes a recording that did not chart or was not released in that territory.

== Awards and nominations ==
=== ARIA Music Awards ===
The ARIA Music Awards is an annual awards ceremony that recognises excellence, innovation, and achievement across all genres of Australian music. They commenced in 1987. 1927 have won three awards.

Year	Nominee / work	Award	Result	Ref.
1989	...ish	Album of the Year	Nominated	
1989	...ish	Breakthrough Artist – Album	Won	
1989	...ish	Highest Selling Album	Nominated	
1989	"If I Could"	Highest Selling Single	Nominated	
1989	"That's When I Think of You"	Single of the Year	Nominated	
1989	"That's When I Think of You"	Breakthrough Artist – Single	Won	
1989	Charles Fisher for 1927 "That's When I Think of You"	Producer of the Year	Nominated	
1989	Jim Bonnefond for 1927 ...ish	Engineer of the Year	Nominated	
1989	Erik Weideman for 1927 ...ish	Best Cover Art	Nominated	
1990	"Compulsory Hero"	Best Group	Nominated	
1990	Geoff Barter for 1927 - "Compulsory Hero"	Best Video	Won	
1990	Charles Fisher for 1927 "Compulsory Hero"	Producer of the Year	Nominated	
1993	Doug Brady for 1927 - "Scars"	Engineer of the Year	Nominated	
