= The Other Side (1927 album) =

Studio album by 1927
- Released: 16 July 1990
- Recorded: 1990
- Studio: Trafalgar Studios, Sydney
- Genre: Australian rock; pop rock
- Length: 41:10
- Label: Trafalgar; Atlantic; WEA
- Producer: Charles Fisher; Garry Frost

1927 chronology
...ish (1989)	The Other Side (1990)	1927 (1992)

Singles from The Other Side
- 1. "Tell Me a Story" Released: 28 May 1990; 2. "Don't Forget Me" Released: 23 July 1990; 3. "The Other Side" Released: October 1990

The Other Side is the second studio album by the Australian pop rock band 1927, which was released on 16 July 1990. It peaked at number three on the ARIA Albums chart and reached No. 50 on its Australian Year End Albums Chart for 1990.

== Background ==
The Other Side is the second studio album by Australian pop rock group, 1927. Founder Garry Frost had left early in 1990. The band recorded the album with Eric Weideman (lead vocals and guitar) as principal songwriter, and Charles Fisher producing and Frost co-producing. The line-up was Weidman joined by James Barton on drums and backing vocals, Charlie Cole on keyboards and backing vocals, and Garry's brother Bill Frost on bass guitar and backing vocals.

The Other Side peaked at No. 3 in July 1990 on the ARIA Albums chart and was preceded by their Top 20 hit single, "Tell Me a Story" (May). Australian musicologist, Ian McFarlane described the album as "full of lush, ambitious arrangements and well-crafted pop, but it lacked the charm and rousing choruses" of their debut album, ...Ish (1989). According to The Canberra Times' Cherie Marriott, "it comprises a strong selection of rock tracks and ballads whose subject matter range from love and friendship to thought provoking global issues."

== Track listing ==
No.	Title	Writer(s)	Length
1.	"Tell Me a Story"	Garry Frost	4:10
2.	"Don't Forget Me"	Eric Weideman	4:40
3.	"Doin' It Wrong"	Weideman	4:03
4.	"The Other Side"	Weideman	5:28
5.	"Africa"	Weideman	4:12
6.	"A World Without You"	Phillip Frost; G. Frost	3:17
7.	"A Day Like Today"	Weideman; P. Frost	3:30
8.	"Call on Me"	P. Frost; Weideman	3:55
9.	"Why?"	G. Frost	4:14
10.	"It's Gonna Get Better"	G. Frost	3:41
Total length:			41:10

== Personnel ==
=== 1927 ===
- James Barton – drums, backing vocals
- Charlie Cole – keyboards, backing vocals
- Bill Frost – bass guitar, backing vocals
- Eric Weideman – lead vocals, guitar

=== Additional musicians ===
- Dave Faulkner
- Erana Clark
- Garry Frost
- Gyan
- Maggie McKinney
- Rick Chadwick
- Rick Price,
- Shauna Jenson
- Sunil De Silva
- Graham Jessie – saxophone (track 5)

=== Technical ===
- Don Bartley – mastering
- Jim Bonnefond – engineering, remixer (tracks 1–5, 7)
- Oki Doke – photography
- Charles Fisher – production, remixer (tracks 1–5, 7)
- Trudi Fletcher – art direction
- Garry Frost – co-producer (tracks 1, 6, 9, 10)
- David Mackie – engineering assistance
- Philip Mortlock – cover concept

== Charts ==
=== Weekly charts ===
Chart (1990)	Peak position
Australian Albums (ARIA)	3

=== Year-end charts ===
Chart (1990)	Position
Australian Albums (ARIA)	50
Australian Artist Albums (ARIA)	15

== Certifications ==
Region	Certification	Certified units/sales
Australia (ARIA)	Platinum	70,000^{^}
^{^} Shipments figures based on certification alone.
