= ...Ish (album) =

...ish

Studio album by 1927
- Released: 14 November 1988
- Recorded: August–October 1988
- Genre: Australian rock; pop rock
- Length: 38:16
- Label: Trafalgar; Atlantic; WEA
- Producer: Charles Fisher; Jim Bonneford

1927 chronology
...ish (1988)	The Other Side (1990)

Singles from ...ish
- 1. "That's When I Think of You" Released: September 1988; 2. "If I Could" Released: November 1988; 3. "You'll Never Know" Released: February 1989; 4. "Compulsory Hero" Released: April 1989; 5. "To Love Me" Released: June 1989

...ish is the debut album by Australian pop rock band 1927, released on 14 November 1988, which peaked at number one for four weeks in early 1989 on the ARIA Albums Chart. The album remained in the top 50 for 46 weeks and reached No. 2 on the 1989 ARIA Year End Albums Chart. The album was awarded 5× platinum certification – for shipment of more than 350,000 copies. At the ARIA Music Awards of 1989, 1927 won 'Breakthrough Artist – Single' for "That's When I Think of You" and 'Breakthrough Artist – Album' for ...ish. At the 1990 ceremony the group won 'Best Video' for "Compulsory Hero", which was directed by Geoff Barter. In 1999 rock music historian, Ian McFarlane, described the album as "brimful of stirring, stately pop rock anthems". As of 2002, it was in the top 10 of the most successful debut albums by Australian artists.

== Background ==
1927 formed in Melbourne in 1987 as a pop, rock band with James Barton on drums, Bill Frost on bass guitar, his brother Garry Frost (ex-Moving Pictures) on guitar and keyboards, and Eric Weideman on lead vocals and guitar. After a year of vainly seeking a recording contract, 1927 were signed by Charles Fisher for his label, Trafalgar Productions. With Fisher producing the group recorded their debut single, "That's When I Think of You", which entered the ARIA Singles Chart in September 1988 and peaked at No. 6. It is co-written by Garry Frost and Weideman. In 2011 former Hi-5 member, Nathan Foley, covered "That's When I Think of You" on his live album, Acoustic Rhythms. In November 1988 the band released their second single, "If I Could", which peaked at No. 4. It was co-produced by Fisher with Jim Bonneford (their engineer), and was written by Garry Frost. In mid-November their debut album, ...ish, largely produced by Fisher (except "If I Could"), followed. Rock music historian, Ian McFarlane, described it as "brimful of stirring, stately pop rock anthems". It peaked at No. 1 on the ARIA Albums Chart for four weeks and stayed in the Top 100 for 71 weeks. It was awarded 5× platinum certification – for shipment of more than 350,000 copies. As of 2002, it was in the top 10 of the most successful debut albums by Australian artists.

Two more top 20 singles from the album followed, "You'll Never Know" (February 1989) and "Compulsory Hero" (April). A fifth single, "To Love Me", was issued in June but did not reach the top 50. In 1989 "That's When I Think of You" was released internationally, it peaked in the Top 50 on the United Kingdom Singles Chart, and just reached the United States Billboard Hot 100. At the ARIA Music Awards of 1989, 1927 won 'Breakthrough Artist – Single' for "That's When I Think of You" and 'Breakthrough Artist – Album' for ...ish. On the 1989 ARIA End of Year Top 50 Albums Chart it reached No. 2. At the 1990 ceremony the group won 'Best Video' for "Compulsory Hero", which was directed by Geoff Barter. The band added Charlie Cole on keyboards (ex-Moving Pictures) and toured Australia in support of the album and associated singles. By late 1989, they started work for their second album, The Other Side, when Garry Frost announced he was leaving the band early the following year.

== Track listing ==
All tracks are written by Garry Frost, except where noted

No.	Title	Writer(s)	Length
1.	"To Love Me"	Eric Weideman; Garry Frost	4:21
2.	"That's When I Think of You"	Weideman; G Frost	4:13
3.	"If I Could"		3:40
4.	"You'll Never Know"	Armondo Hurley; G Frost	3:40
5.	"Compulsory Hero"		4:34
6.	"All the People"	Weideman; G Frost	3:53
7.	"Nothing in the Universe"		4:05
8.	"Propaganda Machine"	Weideman; Philip Frost; G Frost	3:25
9.	"Give the Kid a Break"		3:35
10.	"The Mess"		2:43
Total length:			38:16

== Personnel ==
=== 1927 ===
- James Barton – drums
- Bill Frost – bass guitar
- Garry Frost – guitar, keyboards
- Eric Weideman – lead vocals, guitar

=== Technical ===
- Charles Fisher – production
- Jim Bonneford – production (track 3)
- David Hemming – engineering
- Jim Bonneford – engineering

== Chart positions ==
=== Weekly charts ===
Weekly chart performance for ...ish
Chart (1988–1989)	Peak position
Australian Albums (ARIA)	1
New Zealand Albums (RMNZ)	35

=== Year-end charts ===
Year-end chart performance for ...ish
Chart (1989)	Position
Australian Albums (ARIA)	2

== Certifications ==
Region	Certification	Certified units/sales
Australia (ARIA)	5× Platinum	350,000^{^}
^{^} Shipments figures based on certification alone.
