= The Comedy Store, Sydney =

Entertainment venue in Sydney, Australia

The Comedy Store is a venue for stand-up comedy in Sydney, Australia.

== History ==
The Comedy Store was established in 1981, after comedian Rodney Rude, then touring and living in North America, was asked by his friend Barry Wain to return to Australia to set up a comedy venue in Sydney, New South Wales. Rude did so, and was the first compere at the city venue.

In April 2008, a second Comedy Store, with seating for 300 patrons, was opened in Parramatta. However, in July 2008 the operating company, Tearoc Pty Ltd, went into voluntary liquidation. The Parramatta venue closed permanently, while the city one in the Entertainment Quarter, which had been closed for maintenance and repairs, was in doubt. There were no other comedy venues in the city.

Century Venues (who also operate the Metro, the Enmore and Factory Theatres in Sydney, and run the Sydney Comedy Festival), took over the Comedy Store in November 2008.

== Description ==
Comedy Store is not affiliated to the UK venues of the same name. It is a comedy venue situated in the Entertainment Quarter, Moore Park, Sydney.

As of 2026, The Comedy Store hosts not only hour-long shows of individual comedians, but also 90-minute sets featuring multiple artists from Thursday to Saturday nights, known as Showcases. There are two event spaces: The Comedy Store, seating 290, and Store Too, seating 120.

The Comedy Store is one of several venues that host the Sydney Comedy Festival.

== Notable comedians ==
Australian comedians such as Julia Morris, Dave Hughes, Kitty Flanagan, Carl Barron, and Adam Hills have performed at the venue, helping to launch their careers. Later came Wil Anderson, Urzila Carlson, Jim Jefferies, Tim Minchin, and Becky Lucas.

International stars such as Robin Williams, Tom Arnold, Doug Stanhope, Kevin Hart, Stephen K Amos, Sara Pascoe, and Sacha Baron Cohen have also had gigs at the Comedy Store.
