= You'll Never Know (1927 song) =

Single by 1927

from the album ...ish
- A-side: "You'll Never Know"
- B-side: "Willing and Able"
- Released: 23 January 1989
- Recorded: 1987–88
- Genre: Pop rock
- Length: 3:41
- Label: WEA
- Songwriters: Garry Frost; Armondo Hurley
- Producer: Charles Fisher

1927 singles chronology
"If I Could" (1988)	"You'll Never Know" (1989)	"Compulsory Hero" (1989)

"You'll Never Know" is the third single by Australian pop rock band 1927. The track was released in January 1989 and peaked at number 15 in March on the ARIA singles chart. The song is taken from their debut album...ish which peaked at number 1 on the ARIA Charts in April 1989.

== Track listing ==
7" single
No.	Title	Length
1.	"You'll Never Know"	3:41
2.	"Willing and Able"

12" single / CD single
No.	Title	Length
1.	"You'll Never Know"	3:41
2.	"Willing and Able"
3.	"Give the Kid a Break"	3:36
4.	"The Mess"	2:35

== Charts ==
=== Weekly chart ===
Chart (1989)	Peak position
Australia (ARIA)	15

=== Year-end chart ===
Chart (1989)	Position
Australia (ARIA)	81
