= Don't Forget Me (1927 song) =

Single by 1927

from the album The Other Side
- A-side: "Don't Forget Me"
- B-side: "It's Gonna Get Better"
- Released: 23 July 1990
- Recorded: 1989–90
- Genre: Pop rock
- Length: 4:40
- Label: WEA
- Songwriter: Eric Weideman
- Producer: Charles Fisher

1927 singles chronology
"Tell Me a Story" (1990)	"Don't Forget Me" (1990)	"The Other Side" (1990)

"Don't Forget Me" is the second single by Australian pop rock band 1927's second studio album The Other Side (1990). The track was released in July 1990 and peaked at number 42 on the ARIA singles chart.

== Track listing ==
7" / CD single
No.	Title	Length
1.	"Tell Me a Story"	4:40
2.	"It's Gonna Get Better"	3:41

12" / CD maxi
No.	Title	Length
1.	"Tell Me a Story"	4:40
2.	"All the People" (Live)	4:49
3.	"Seventeen"	3:33
4.	"It's Gonna Get Better"	3:41

== Charts ==
Chart (1990)	Peak position
Australia (ARIA)	42
