= Compulsory Hero =

Single by 1927

from the album ...ish
- A-side: "Compulsory Hero"
- B-side: "Propaganda Machine"
- Released: 17 April 1989
- Recorded: 1987–88
- Genre: Pop rock
- Length: 4:34
- Label: WEA
- Songwriter: Garry Frost
- Producer: Charles Fisher

1927 singles chronology
"You'll Never Know" (1988)	"Compulsory Hero" (1989)	"To Love Me" (1989)

"Compulsory Hero" is the fourth single by Australian pop rock band 1927. The track was released on 17 April 1989 and peaked at number 14 in May on the ARIA singles chart. The song is taken from their debut album ...ish which peaked at number 1 on the ARIA Charts in April 1989.

At the ARIA Music Awards of 1990, Geoff Barter won the ARIA Award for Best Video. The song was further nominated for Best Group but lost to The Black Sorrows.

The song talks about a father's experience in the Vietnam War.

== Track listing ==
7" / CD single
No.	Title	Length
1.	"Compulsory Hero"	4:34
2.	"Propaganda Machine"	3:25

== Charts ==
=== Weekly chart ===
Chart (1989)	Peak position
Australia (ARIA)	14
