= 1927 (album) =

Studio album by 1927
- Released: 16 November 1992
- Genre: Australian rock; pop rock
- Length: 47:04
- Label: Trafalgar; WEA
- Producer: Mark Opitz

1927 chronology
The Other Side (1990)	1927 (1992)	The Very Best of 1927 (1996)

Singles from 1927
- 1. "Scars" Released: October 1992; 2. "It Ain't Love" Released: 1993

1927 is the self-titled album by the Australian pop rock band, 1927 released in November 1992. It reached No. 40 on the ARIA albums chart.

== Track listing ==
All tracks are written by Eric Weideman, except where noted.

No.	Title	Writer(s)	Length
1.	"Dreamstate"	Eric Weideman; Philip Frost	4:28
2.	"It Ain't Love"		4:05
3.	"Scars"		3:49
4.	"Big White Bird"		6:03
5.	"Modern Culture"		3:18
6.	"Colour Division"		3:29
7.	"Fix of You"	Words: Eric Weideman; Sam Weideman; Music: Eric Weideman	4:53
8.	"Kaleidoscope Eyes"		3:08
9.	"Be My Baby"		4:25
10.	"All the Stars"	Eric Weideman; Philip Frost	4:00
11.	"Far Beyond The Probing Eye"	Philip Frost	3:05
12.	"Ladybird"		2:21
Total length:			47:04

== Charts ==
Chart (1992)	Peak position
Australian Albums (ARIA)	40

== Personnel ==
- Eric Weideman – vocals, guitar, keyboards
- Bill Frost – bass, vocals
- Dave Dwyer – guitar, vocals, keyboards
- Phillip Campbell – drums
