= Tell Me a Story (1927 song) =

Single by 1927

from the album The Other Side
- A-side: "Tell Me a Story"
- B-side: "Call on Me"
- Released: 28 May 1990
- Recorded: 1989–90
- Genre: Pop rock
- Length: 4:10
- Label: WEA
- Songwriter: Garry Frost
- Producers: Garry Frost; Charles Fisher

1927 singles chronology
"To Love Me" (1989)	"Tell Me a Story" (1990)	"Don't Forget Me" (1990)

"Tell Me a Story" is the first single by Australian pop rock band 1927's second studio album The Other Side (1990). The track was released in May 1990 and peaked at number 17 in May on the ARIA singles chart.

== Track listing ==
CD single
No.	Title	Length
1.	"Tell Me a Story"	4:10
2.	"Call on Me"	3:55

== Charts ==
=== Weekly charts ===
Chart (1990)	Peak position
Australia (ARIA)	17

=== Year-end chart ===
Chart (1990)	Position
Australia (ARIA)	96
