= That's When I Think of You =

1988 single by 1927

Single by 1927

from the album ...ish
- B-side: "Alright"; "The Mess"
- Released: 4 July 1988
- Length: 3:40
- Label: WEA
- Songwriters: Garry Frost; Eric Weideman
- Producer: Charles Fisher

1927 singles chronology
"That's When I Think of You" (1988)	"If I Could" (1988)

Music video
- "That's When I Think of You" on YouTube

"That's When I Think of You" is a song by Australian pop rock band 1927. The song was released on 4 July 1988 as their debut single and peaked at number six on the Australian ARIA Singles Chart. In May 1989, the song reached number 46 on the UK Singles Chart. The single also charted at number 100 on the US Billboard Hot 100 and number 55 on the Canadian RPM 100 Singles chart in August 1989.

The track won the award for Breakthrough Artist at the ARIA Music Awards of 1989 and was nominated for Single of the Year and Producer of the Year, losing to "Under the Milky Way" by the Church and "Age of Reason" by John Farnham, respectively.

== Background ==
1927 formed in Melbourne in 1987 as a pop rock band with James Barton on drums, Bill Frost on bass guitar, his brother Garry Frost (ex-Moving Pictures) on guitar and keyboards, and Eric Weideman on lead vocals and guitar. After a year of vainly seeking a recording contract, 1927 were signed mid-1988 by WEA.

== Track listings ==
All tracks are written by Garry Frost and Eric Weideman, except where noted.

7-inch single
No.	Title	Writer(s)	Length
1.	"That's When I Think of You"		3:40
2.	"Alright"	Frost	3:45

12-inch single
No.	Title	Writer(s)	Length
1.	"That's When I Think of You" (extended version)		5:25
2.	"That's When I Think of You"		3:40
3.	"The Mess"	Frost	2:35

European mini-CD single
No.	Title	Writer(s)	Length
1.	"That's When I Think of You"
2.	"Willing and Able"	Frost
3.	"Alright"	Frost
4.	"That's When I Think of You" (extended version)

== Charts ==
=== Weekly chart ===
Chart (1988–1989)	Peak position
Australia (ARIA)	6
Canada Top Singles (RPM)	55
UK Singles (Official Charts)	46
US Billboard Hot 100	100

=== Year-end chart ===
Chart (1988)	Position
Australia (ARIA)	40
Australian Artist (ARIA)	7

== Release history ==
Region	Date	Format(s)	Label(s)	Ref.
Australia	4 July 1988	7-inch vinyl	WEA	
United Kingdom	11 March 1989	7-inch vinyl; 12-inch vinyl	WEA	
Japan	25 September 1989	CD	WEA	
