= If I Could (1927 song) =

Single by 1927

from the album ...ish
- A-side: "If I Could"
- B-side: "Not Talking"
- Released: 24 October 1988
- Recorded: August–October 1988
- Genre: Pop rock
- Length: 3:40
- Label: WEA
- Songwriter: Garry Frost
- Producers: Charles Fisher; Jim Bonneford

1927 singles chronology
"That's When I Think of You" (1988)	"If I Could" (1988)	"You'll Never Know" (1989)

"If I Could" was the second single by Australian pop rock band 1927 from their debut album ...ish. The song was written by Garry Frost and released in October 1988. It peaked at number four on the ARIA Singles Chart and was certified gold.

== Track listing ==
No.	Title	Writer(s)	Length
1.	"If I Could"	Garry Frost	3:40
2.	"Not Talking"	Eric Weideman	2:46

== Charts ==
=== Weekly chart ===
Chart (1988–1989)	Peak position
Australia (ARIA)	4

=== Year-end chart ===
Chart (1989)	Position
Australia (ARIA)	21

== Certifications ==
Region	Certification	Certified units/sales
Australia (ARIA)	Gold	35,000^{^}
^{^} Shipments figures based on certification alone.
