= Pure Moods =

1990s new-age music album series

Compilation album by Various Artists
- Released: 1994 (original release); April 29, 1997 (re-release)
- Recorded: Various dates
- Genres: New-age; ambient; trip hop; downtempo
- Length: 69:04
- Label: Virgin Records

Professional ratings
Review scores
Source	Rating
AllMusic	5/5 stars
Pitchfork	7.5/10

Pure Moods is the first United States release of a series of compilation albums of new-age music released by Virgin Records. The original was titled Moods – A Contemporary Soundtrack and released in the UK in 1991. This was followed by Moods 2 in 1992. The series focuses on the genres of new-age, ambient, world music, and to a lesser extent, downtempo, trip-hop and smooth jazz. Several artists are featured regularly throughout the series such as Massive Attack, Moby, Delerium, Enigma, Enya, Adiemus, Sacred Spirit and Yanni.

The original volume of the series was initially promoted and sold by direct response television commercials. The first volume was initially released in 1994, with a different track listing from the 1997 re-release. There are twelve albums released by Virgin Records in the series — five "main entry" albums and six spin-off albums (Celtic, Scottish, Instrumental, Romantic, Gregorian and Christmas). Scottish Moods stands alone as an album featuring a single performer, David Methen and The Munros, while all the others are albums featuring multiple artists.

== Track listings ==
=== Pure Moods (original 1994 release) ===
No.	Title	Artist	Length
1.	"Return to Innocence"	Enigma	4:10
2.	"Sweet Lullaby"	Deep Forest	3:51
3.	"Crockett's Theme"	Jan Hammer	3:34
4.	"Oxygène Part IV"	Jean-Michel Jarre	3:19
5.	"Orinoco Flow"	Enya	3:46
6.	"Tubular Bells Part 1" (opening excerpt)	Mike Oldfield	4:59
7.	"Chariots of Fire"	Vangelis	3:26
8.	"The Heart Asks Pleasure First / The Promise" (theme from The Piano)	Michael Nyman	3:13
9.	"Chi Mai"	Ennio Morricone	5:04
10.	"Inspector Morse Theme"	Barrington Pheloung	2:08
11.	"Sadeness"	Enigma	4:16
12.	"Little Fluffy Clouds"	The Orb	4:02
13.	"Only You"	Praise	3:38
14.	"Aria on Air" (as featured on a British Airways commercial)	Malcolm McLaren	4:09
15.	"Lily Was Here"	David A. Stewart featuring Candy Dulfer	4:18
16.	"Songbird"	Kenny G	4:59
17.	"Merry Christmas Mr Lawrence"	Ryuichi Sakamoto	4:29
18.	"Twin Peaks Theme (Instrumental)"	Angelo Badalamenti	5:01
19.	"Theme from The Mission"	Ennio Morricone	2:52
20.	"Another Green World"	Brian Eno	1:31

=== Pure Moods (1997 re-release) ===
Release date: April 29, 1997
Label / Catalog #: Virgin Records US: 42186
UPC: 7 24384 21862 1

No.	Title	Artist	Length
1.	"Return to Innocence"	Enigma	4:10
2.	"Orinoco Flow"	Enya	3:46
3.	"Sweet Lullaby"	Deep Forest	3:51
4.	"Oxygène Part IV"	Jean-Michel Jarre	3:19
5.	"The X-Files Theme (DADO Paranormal Activity Mix)"	DJ Dado	3:30
6.	"Tubular Bells Part 1"	Mike Oldfield	4:59
7.	"Sadeness, Pt. 1"	Enigma	4:16
8.	"Adiemus"	Karl Jenkins	3:59
9.	"Crockett's Theme"	Jan Hammer	3:34
10.	"Theme from The Mission"	Ennio Morricone	2:52
11.	"Main Title Theme from The Last Emperor"	David Byrne	4:03
12.	"Yeha-Noha (Wishes of Happiness & Prosperity)"	Sacred Spirit	4:26
13.	"Theme from Twin Peaks: Fire Walk with Me"	Angelo Badalamenti	5:01
14.	"Makambo"	Geoffrey Oryema	5:01
15.	"My Wife with Champagne Shoulders"	Mark Isham	5:32
16.	"The Promise"	Michael Nyman	3:13
17.	"Lily Was Here"	David A. Stewart, Candy Dulfer	4:18

=== Instrumental Moods (original 1995 UK release) ===
Release date: November 6, 1995
Label / Catalogue Number: Virgin Records UK: VTCD 65
UPC: 7 24384 11232 5

No.	Title	Artist	Length
1.	"Riverdance"	John Anderson Concert Orchestra	3:51
2.	"Cacharpaya"	Incantation	2:54
3.	"Return to Innocence"	Enigma	4:08
4.	"Yeha-Noha (Wishes of Happiness & Prosperity)"	Sacred Spirit	4:26
5.	"The Celts"	Enya	2:57
6.	"Sentinel"	Mike Oldfield	3:56
7.	"Samba Pa Ti"	Santana	3:09
8.	"Albatross"	Fleetwood Mac	3:09
9.	"Love's Theme from Midnight Express"	Giorgio Moroder	5:33
10.	"Adiemus"	Karl Jenkins	3:59
11.	"Songbird"	Kenny G	4:59
12.	"Cavatina" (Theme from The Deer Hunter)	John Williams	3:35
13.	"Don't Cry For Me Argentina"	The Shadows	3:24
14.	"Inspector Morse Theme"	Barrington Pheloung	3:28
15.	"Brideshead Revisited theme"	Geoffrey Burgon	2:03
16.	"Theme from Soldier Soldier"	Jim Parker	2:54
17.	"Chi Mai"	Ennio Morricone	5:07
18.	"Stranger on the Shore"	Acker Bilk	2:58
19.	"Theme from People's Century"	People's Century Orchestra	1:46
20.	"Panis angelicus" (Theme from The Choir)	Anthony Way	3:23

=== Cinema Moods (1995) ===
Release year: 1995

No.	Title	Artist	Length
1.	"Theme From The Piano"	Michael Nyman
2.	"Theme From The Sheltering Sky"	Ryuichi Sakamoto
3.	"Theme From Dangerous Liaisons"	George Fenton
4.	"Theme From The Mission"	Ennio Morricone
5.	"Music From Shadowlands"	George Fenton
6.	"Theme From Jean de Florette"	Jean-Claude Petit
7.	"Opening Titles From The Remains Of The Day"	Richard Robbins
8.	"Theme From Germinal"	Jean-Louis Roques
9.	"Music From Betty Blue"	Gabriel Yared
10.	"Main Theme From The Last Emperor"	David Byrne
11.	"Music From The Killing Fields"	Mike Oldfield
12.	"Music From The Draughtsman's Contract"	Michael Nyman
13.	"Music From The Age of Innocence"	Elmer Bernstein
14.	"Theme From Hamlet"	Ennio Morricone
15.	"Music From A Room With A View"	Richard Robbins
16.	"Theme From Cinema Paradiso"	Ennio Morricone
17.	"Music From Platoon"	Samuel Barber
18.	"Theme From The Big Blue"	Éric Serra

=== Gregorian Moods (1997) ===
Release date: July 1997
Label / Catalogue Number: Virgin Records UK: VTCD 171

No.	Title	Artist	Length
1.	"Cantique de Jean Racine"	Gabriel Fauré
2.	"Ad Coenam Agni Providi"	Gregorian Chant
3.	"Locus Iste"	Anton Bruckner
4.	"Attende, Domine"	Gregorian Chant
5.	"Ave verum corpus"	Edward Elgar
6.	"Venite, Filli"	Gregorian Chant
7.	"Pange Lingua"	Gregorian Chant
8.	"Crux Fidelis"	King John Of Portugal
9.	"Laeta Dies Magni Ducis"	Gregorian Chant
10.	"Ave Verum Corpus"	Wolfgang Amadeus Mozart
11.	"Veni, Sancte Spiritus"	Gregorian Chant
12.	"Thou Knowest, Lord"	Henry Purcell
13.	"Domine, Jesu Christe"	Gregorian Chant
14.	"Geistliches Lied"	Johannes Brahms
15.	"A Solis Ortus Cardine"	Gregorian Chant
16.	"Magnificat"	Orlando di Lassus
17.	"Ave Verum Corpus"	William Byrd
18.	"Alma Redemptoris Mater"	Gregorian Chant
19.	"O How Amiable"	Ralph Vaughan Williams

=== Celtic Moods (1997) ===
Release date: November 11, 1997
Label / Catalog #: Virgin Records US: 44951

No.	Title	Artist	Length
1.	"Overture (Rob Roy/The Rieving Party)"	Carter Burwell	4:43
2.	"Theme From Harry's Game"	Clannad	2:30
3.	"Samain Night"	Loreena McKennitt	4:31
4.	"Only a Woman's Heart"	Eleanor McEvoy	3:38
5.	"Strange Boat"	The Waterboys	3:03
6.	"Invisible to You"	Mary Coughlan	4:30
7.	"The Call to Dance Medley (Westburne Reel, Andy Renwick's Ferret)"	Leahy	4:07
8.	"The Gaelic Reels"	Capercaillie	1:08
9.	"Sleepy Maggie"	Ashley MacIsaac	5:29
10.	"The Crib of Perches/Carmel Maloney Mulhaire's"	Matt Malloy	3:30
11.	"Blackbird"	Sharon Shannon	3:37
12.	"Heroine"	The Edge & Sinéad O'Connor	4:26
13.	"No Frontiers"	Mary Black	3:59
14.	"The Island"	Paul Brady	5:26
15.	"Caide Sin Don Te Sin?"	Altan	3:14
16.	"Ride On"	Christy Moore	4:06
17.	"Woodbrook"	Mícheál Ó Súilleabháin	3:29

=== Instrumental Moods (1998) ===
Release date: February 24, 1998
Label / Catalog #: Virgin Records US: 45397

No.	Title	Artist	Length
1.	"In the Full Moon Light"	3rd Force	4:40
2.	"Knocking on Forbidden Doors"	Enigma	3:54
3.	"Barcelona Nights"	Ottmar Liebert	4:03
4.	"Montezuma"	Cusco	4:07
5.	"Dawa (Cradlesong)"	Sacred Spirit	4:15
6.	"Heat (From The Fifth Element)"	Éric Serra	2:54
7.	"Tempest"	Jesse Cook	2:58
8.	"Cliffs of Dover"	Eric Johnson	3:44
9.	"Midnight Express"	Neal Schon	5:10
10.	"Weather Storm"	Massive Attack	4:59
11.	"Samba Pa Ti"	Santana	3:09
12.	"Sure-As-Not (Full Whack Dub)"	Afro Celt Sound System	6:51
13.	"Widescreen"	Vanessa-Mae	3:53
14.	"Gabriel's Oboe (From The Mission)"	Ennio Morricone	2:13
15.	"Cristofori's Dream"	David Lanz	6:02
16.	"Gathering of the Tribes"	Craig Chaquico	4:54

=== Christmas Moods (1998) ===
Release date: October 20, 1998
Label / Catalog #: Virgin Records US: 46753

No.	Title	Artist	Length
1.	"We Three Kings"	David Arkenstone	5:20
2.	"O Come All Ye Faithful"	Nando Lauria	3:28
3.	"I Believe in Father Christmas"	State of the Heart	3:16
4.	"Mistletoe and Wine"	State of the Heart	2:54
5.	"First Noel"	Spencer Brewer	4:54
6.	"Christmas Eve"	Ira Stein	4:34
7.	"Unto Us a Boy Is Born"	Michael Jones	4:08
8.	"Gloria"	Nando Lauria	5:58
9.	"Fairytale of New York"	State of the Heart	3:02
10.	"Blue Christmas"	State of the Heart	3:20
11.	"White Christmas"	State of the Heart	4:38
12.	"When a Child Is Born/Stay Another Day Medley"	State of the Heart	5:55
13.	"Ukrainian Carol"	Spencer Brewer	3:38
14.	"Away in a Manger"	David Darling	3:13
15.	"I Saw Three Ships"	David Arkenstone	4:33
16.	"Gaudete"	Mediæval Bæbes	2:17

=== Pure Moods II (1998) ===
Release date: November 17, 1998
Label / Catalog #: Virgin Records US: 46796

No.	Title	Artist	Length
1.	"The Mummers' Dance"	Loreena McKennitt	6:08
2.	"Montezuma"	Cusco	5:18
3.	"The Cradlesong (DaWa)" (remix)	Sacred Spirit	4:00
4.	"Nightingale"	Yanni	5:44
5.	"Life in a Northern Town"	Dream Academy	4:18
6.	"Zarabanda (Saraband)"	Adiemus	4:37
7.	"Euphoria (Firefly)"	Delerium	4:36
8.	"Weather Storm"	Craig Armstrong	6:05
9.	"Teardrop" (edit)	Massive Attack (featuring Elizabeth Fraser)	4:10
10.	"Theme from Harry's Game"	Clannad	2:27
11.	"Chariots of Fire"	Vangelis	3:31
12.	"Breezin'"	George Benson	5:39
13.	"Emily"	Dave Koz	5:30
14.	"2 the Night"	Ottmar Liebert	4:19
15.	"Beyond the Invisible" (short radio edit)	Enigma	3:43
16.	"The Mystic's Dream"	Loreena McKennitt	7:43

=== Scottish Moods (1999) ===
Release date: February 23, 1999
Label / Catalog #: Virgin Records US: 46986

No.	Title	Artist	Length
1.	"Dark Island"	David Methven and the Munros	2:48
2.	"Amazing Grace"	David Methven and the Munros	2:03
3.	"My Home"	David Methven and the Munros	2:37
4.	"Skye Boat Song"	David Methven and the Munros	2:32
5.	"Highland Cathedral"	David Methven and the Munros	2:51
6.	"Hasten and Come with Me"	David Methven and the Munros	2:47
7.	"Scots Wha Hae"	David Methven and the Munros	2:44
8.	"Flower of Scotland"	David Methven and the Munros	3:20
9.	"Scottish Soldier" (Green Hills of Tyrone)	David Methven and the Munros	4:26
10.	"El Alamein"	David Methven and the Munros	3:07
11.	"Lord Lovat's Lament"	David Methven and the Munros	2:42
12.	"Ye Banks and Braes"	David Methven and the Munros	3:27
13.	"Abide with Me"	David Methven and the Munros	2:30
14.	"Ae Fond Kiss"	David Methven and the Munros	3:51
15.	"Morag of Dunvegan"	David Methven and the Munros	1:56
16.	"Auld Lang Syne"	David Methven and the Munros	1:58
17.	"Glengarry's Lament"	David Methven and the Munros	2:00

=== Pure Moods III (2001) ===
Release date: February 6, 2001
Label / Catalog #: Virgin Records US: 50935

No.	Title	Artist	Length
1.	"Only If..."	Enya	3:18
2.	"Porcelain"	Moby	3:31
3.	"Life in Mono"	Mono	4:27
4.	"Games Without Frontiers" (Massive Attack / David Bottrill remix)	Peter Gabriel	5:18
5.	"Cristofori's Dream"	David Lanz	6:03
6.	"Land of Anaka"	Geoffrey Oryema and Brian Eno	5:19
7.	"Dela Dela"	Sacred Spirit	4:42
8.	"Merry Christmas, Mr. Lawrence"	Ryuichi Sakamoto	4:36
9.	"The Velocity of Love"	Suzanne Ciani	4:27
10.	"Ever So Lonely / Eyes / Ocean"	Sheila Chandra	3:24
11.	"Virtue"	Jesse Cook	4:08
12.	"Theme from Silk Road"	Kitaro	4:30
13.	"Synaesthetic"	Blue Man Group	5:32
14.	"On Sacred Ground"	Yanni	7:07
15.	"Gravity of Love"	Enigma	3:57
16.	"Deliver Me"	Sarah Brightman	4:00

=== Pure Moods IV (2002) ===
Release date: October 1, 2002
Label / Catalog #: Virgin Records US: 12082

No.	Title	Artist	Length
1.	"November"	Mythos	4:58
2.	"Purify"	Balligomingo	4:14
3.	"Shadows in Silence"	Enigma	4:19
4.	"Silence"	Delerium featuring Sarah McLachlan	6:34
5.	"Songs from a Secret Garden"	Secret Garden	3:31
6.	"One Man's Dream"	Yanni	2:45
7.	"Devotion"	Jim Brickman	3:36
8.	"Fields of Gold"	Eva Cassidy	4:42
9.	"Garden of Eden"	Govi	2:54
10.	"La Valse d'Amélie" (Theme from Amélie)	Yann Tiersen	2:00
11.	"Sea"	George Winston	2:42
12.	"God Moving Over the Face of the Waters"	Moby	5:45
13.	"Main Titles (From Chocolat)"	Rachel Portman	3:09
14.	"Angel"	Sarah McLachlan	4:28
15.	"She Moves Through the Fair"	B-Tribe	5:00
16.	"This Love"	Craig Armstrong featuring Elizabeth Fraser	6:19
17.	"River of Stars"	Paul Schwartz	4:04
18.	"When You're Falling"	Afro Celt Sound System featuring Peter Gabriel	5:17

=== Romantic Moods (2002) ===
Release year: 2002

No.	Title	Length
1.	"Endless Tide"	5:24
2.	"Sea of Serenity"	4:39
3.	"Starfinder"	5:44
4.	"Halycon Blue"	5:25
5.	"Leeward Shore"	5:11
6.	"Fantasea"	5:21
7.	"Forest Beneath the Waves"	4:38
8.	"Atlantica"	5:17
9.	"Driftwood"	5:41
10.	"Oceanic Dreams"	4:45

=== Pure Moods: Celestial Celebration (2004) ===
Release date: February 24, 2004
Label / Catalog #: Virgin Records US: 96797

No.	Title	Artist	Length
1.	"Here with Me"	Dido	4:16
2.	"Building a Mystery" (live)	Sarah McLachlan	4:08
3.	"Love of Strings"	Moby	6:12
4.	"More Than This"	Charlie Hunter featuring Norah Jones	4:11
5.	"Wake Up in New York"	Craig Armstrong featuring Evan Dando	3:32
6.	"Have a Day / Celebratory"	The Polyphonic Spree	4:39
7.	"Amado Mio"	Pink Martini	4:48
8.	"San Antonio"	Kinky	3:33
9.	"Euphoria" (edit)	Delerium	4:35
10.	"Voyageur" (Chillout Mix)	Enigma	4:54
11.	"Crescent Silver Scythe"	Sheila Chandra	3:48
12.	"I Don't Know What I Can Save You From" (Röyksopp Remix)	Kings of Convenience	4:16
13.	"Weather Storm"	Massive Attack	5:01
14.	"Harvest Moon"	Cassandra Wilson	5:03
15.	"The Chokin' Kind"	Joss Stone	3:38
16.	"Days Go By" (Acoustic Version)	Dirty Vegas	2:46
17.	"Ain't No Sunshine"	Eva Cassidy	3:25
18.	"What a Wonderful World"	Sarah Brightman	3:41
