= Stepping Stones (album) =

Stepping Stones- The Best Of

Greatest hits album by Wendy Matthews
- Released: 5 March 1999
- Recorded: 1989–1998
- Genre: Pop
- Label: Sony BMG

Wendy Matthews chronology
Ghosts (1997)	Stepping Stones- The Best Of (1999)	Beautiful View (2001)

Stepping Stones is a greatest-hits album released by Australian artist Wendy Matthews in March 1999. The album peaked at number 4 on the Australian charts. A DVD collection featuring all the music videos was also released.

== Track listing ==
No.	Title	Writer(s)	Album	Length
1.	"I've Got to Have You"	Kris Kristofferson	new recording	3:50
2.	"Friday's Child"	David Munday; Sandy Stewart	Lily	3:59
3.	"Token Angels"	Roger Mason	Émigré	4:50
4.	"The Day You Went Away"	Johnny Male	Lily	4:40
5.	"Standing Strong"	Wendy Matthews; Glenn Skinner	The Witness Tree	4:54
6.	"Let's Kiss (Like Angels Do)"	Cal Curtis; Jud Friedman	Émigré	3:27
7.	"Then I Walked Away"	Gary Clark; Eric Pressley	Ghosts	4:09
8.	"Beloved"	Matthews; Skinner	Ghosts	4:31
9.	"Happy"	Matthews; Tim Finn	The Witness Tree	3:26
10.	"Woman's Gotta Have It"	Bobby Womack	Émigré	4:18
11.	"If Only I Could"	Claus Zundel; Mike Staab; Sydney Youngblood; Ralf Hamm	Lily	3:52
12.	"Big"	Matthews; Skinner	Ghosts	3:32
13.	"Love Will Keep Me Alive"	Jim Capaldi; Paul Carrack; Peter Vale	The Witness Tree	4:15
14.	"I Don't Want to Be with Nobody but You" (Absent Friends featuring Wendy Matthews)	Eddie Floyd	Here's Looking Up Your Address	4:45
15.	"These Streets"	Christine Anu; David Bridie	new recording	3:40
16.	"T.K.O."	Cecil Womack	Lily	5:21
17.	"O Happy Day"	Edwin Hawkins	Witness Tree	4:48
18.	"Quiet Art"	Matthews; M. O'Connor)	Lily	5:51

== Charts ==
=== Weekly charts ===
Chart (1999)	Peak position
Australian Albums (ARIA)	4

=== Year-end charts ===
Chart (1999)	Rank
Australian Albums Chart	44
Australian Artist Albums Chart	10

== Certifications ==
Region	Certification	Certified units/sales
Australia (ARIA)	Platinum	70,000^{^}
^{^} Shipments figures based on certification alone.
