= Moroccan Spirit =

Moroccan Spirit is a down tempo new age/ethnic fusion musical project/album by German musicians Ralf Hamm, Markus Staab and Claus "The Brave" Zundel, Ibiza-based producers of Sacred Spirit, B-Tribe and other projects. Their music is often characterized as different from other projects by The Brave. They combine traditional Moroccan music with moderate club beats and synthesizer enhancement. Only one album was released under the project name in 2002. The album is sometimes counted as one of Sacred Spirit's (including some official sources). The Brave recorded authentic Moroccan singers and instruments for this album to which they then added their trademark ambiance and mood. The vocals are generally solo-voice, some male and some female. The track "Midunya" is a reworking of Medunya from the One Little Creature album, now with a more Arabic feel.

== Track listing ==
1. Music For 1001 Nights (Intro) 2:31
2. Jilala I: Nocturnal Ritual 6:06
3. Jim I Nim 3:45
4. Moroccan Soul 6:03
5. Moussem Of Regragas 4:52
6. Midunya 5:07
7. Narcisse Noir 3:38
8. Derviche 5:11
9. Jilala II: Nocturnal Ritual 3:29
10. La Mamounia 7:43
11. Moussem Mediouna 4:12
12. Music For 1001 Nights (Outro) 4:52

Some of tracks used fragments of Persian traditional music as accompaniment, such as a fragment of vocal by Master Mohammad Reza Shajarian in #3; a fragment of playing of Persian santour by Master Faramarz Payvar in #5; a fragment of "Night, Silence, desert" album by Master Keyhan Kalhor in #8; and a fragment of "Dastan" Album in "Chahargah mode" by Master Parviz Meshkatian in #10.
