= Yeha-Noha =

1994 single by Sacred Spirit

Single by Sacred Spirit

from the album Chants and Dances of the Native Americans
- Language: Navajo
- B-side: "Dawa"; "Ly-o-lay ale loya"
- Released: 1994
- Genre: New-age; world; ambient
- Length: 3:49; 4:29 (radio edit)
- Label: Virgin
- Producer: The Fearsome Brave

"Yeha-Noha (Wishes of Happiness and Prosperity)" is a song by German musical project Sacred Spirit. It was the first single from the album Chants and Dances of the Native Americans. Released in 1994, it achieved a great success in various countries, including France, where it topped the singles chart. It was sung in the Navajo language by Navajo elder Kee Chee Jake from Chinle, Arizona. The song is a remixed version of a portion of the Navajo Shoe Game song (a part of the origin myth describing a game played among the day animals and night animals where the animals who discovered the shoe in which a yucca ball was hidden would win a permanent state of daylight or night).

The song describes the Giant's (Yé'iitsoh) lament at the owl's attempt to cheat by stealing the ball, saying:

... shaa ninánóh'aah (you give it back to me)

... Yé'iitsoh jinínáá léi' (... The Giant says again and again...)

... ninánóh'aah (...give it back)

== Chart performance ==
The song was certified gold disc in France, after spending 19 weeks on the French Singles Chart, from 8 July 1995. It went to number 26, then jumped to number three and reached number one three weeks later. It topped the chart for six consecutive weeks, then did not stop to drop on the chart. The single charted for 16 weeks on the Ultratop 50, in the Wallonia region of Belgium. It debuted at number 20 on 5 August, reached the top ten in its third week, peaked at number three in its sixth week, then dropped on the chart. It was ranked 23rd on Wallonia's year-end. The song charted twice in United Kingdom in 1995: first for one week, at number 74, on 15 April, then for two weeks from in November, peaking at number 37. "Yeha-Noha" remained for 11 weeks on the US Billboard Dance Club Play chart, reaching number 13.

== Track listings ==
- CD single
1. "Yeha-Noha" – 3:49
2. "Dawa" – 4:18
- European CD maxi
1. "Yeha-Noha" (radio mix) – 4:29
2. "Yeha-Noha" (Tribal Totem mix) – 6:54
3. "Yeha-Noha" (Pow Wow mix) – 7:25
4. "Yeha-Noha" (Peace Pipe mix) – 4:31
- US CD maxi
1. "Yeha-Noha" – 4:04
2. "Yeha-Noha" (house mix with drop) – 8:17
3. "Yeha-Noha" (Buffalo Bump mix) – 10:22
4. "Yeha-Noha" (Pow Wow mix) – 7:25
5. "Ly-o-lay ale loya" (Vanishing Race mix) – 11:12
- 12-inch maxi
1. "Yeha-Noha" (house mix with drop) – 8:17
2. "Yeha-Noha" (Dancing Wolves mix) – 7:42
3. "Yeha-Noha" (Tribal mix) – 7:30
4. "Yeha-Noha" (Pow Wow mix) – 7:25

== Charts ==
=== Weekly charts ===
Weekly chart performance for "Yeha-Noha"
Chart (1994–1995)	Peak position
Australia (ARIA)	76
Belgium (Ultratop 50 Wallonia)	3
Europe (Eurochart Hot 100)	12
France (SNEP)	1
UK Singles (OCC)	37
US Dance Club Play (Billboard)	13

=== Year-end charts ===
Year-end chart performance for "Yeha-Noha"
Chart (1995)	Position
Belgium (Ultratop 50 Wallonia)	23
Europe (Eurochart Hot 100)	50
France (SNEP)	4

== Certifications ==
Certifications for "Yeha-Noha"
Region	Certification	Certified units/sales
France (SNEP)	Gold	250,000^{*}
^{*} Sales figures based on certification alone.

== Uses in the media ==
"Yeha-Noha" was generally credited to "Indians Sacred Spirit" in France, or also just "(The) Indians". Produced by The Fearsome Brave (Claus Zundel), the song was used in a TV advert for the Häagen-Dazs ice-cream in France.

This song, mainly instrumental with Native American vocals, was much aired on radio. The main tune, played the cello, was regularly presented on TF1, the first TV channel in France, as the future summer hit. It also made an appearance in a 1995 British cinema advertisement for the Survival International charity, in which Richard Gere talked about the struggle to survive of the few remaining Native Americans.

In 2003, Cloud 9 Screen Entertainment Group used a section of the track in the official trailer for its smash-hit teen drama series The Tribe.
