= Lily (Wendy Matthews album) =

Studio album by Wendy Matthews
- Released: 28 September 1992
- Recorded: February–March 1992 at Kiva West in Los Angeles and Rhinoceros Studio in Sydney, Australia
- Genre: Pop
- Label: rooArt
- Producer: T-Bone Burnett

Wendy Matthews chronology
The Way It Has to Be (1991)	Lily (1992)	The Witness Tree (1994)

Singles from Lily
- 1. "The Day You Went Away" Released: 31 August 1992; 2. "Friday's Child" Released: 18 January 1993; 3. "If Only I Could" Released: April 1993; 4. "T.K.O." Released: September 1993

Professional ratings
Review scores
Source	Rating
Allmusic	(?)

Lily is the second solo studio album by Australian singer-songwriter Wendy Matthews released by rooArt in Australia on 28 September 1992 (see 1992 in music). Matthews travelled to Canada with her mother for the album to discover their heritage, which influences the album. Matthews states the album "overall, has vulnerability . . . [it is] really heart on your sleeve stuff". The album won Matthews the ARIA Award for Best Female Artist at the ARIA Music Awards of 1993. It yielded four singles: "The Day You Went Away", "Friday's Child", "If Only I Could" and "T.K.O."

The album reached #2 on the Australian album charts and was certified triple-platinum in Australia.

A limited-edition version was later released with a bonus CD, IX, of live tracks. The first five tracks on the bonus disc were recorded live at the Montreux Jazz Festival, July 1993 and the last track is a French version of "The Day You Went Away".

The album was also released in North American and Europe on Atlantic/WEA.

== Track listing ==
All songwriters as listed

1. "Friday's Child" (David Munday, Sandy Stewart) – 3:56
2. "Walk Away" (B. Hogan, J. Koller) – 4:04
3. "T.K.O." (Cecil Womack) – 5:20
4. "Mother Can’t Do" (Robbie James) – 4:32
5. "Quiet Art" (W. Matthews, M. O'Connor) – 5:47
6. "The Day You Went Away" (Guy Batson, Jonathon Edward Male) – 4:39
7. "If Only I Could" (Ralf Hamm, Markus Stabb, Sydney Youngblood, Claus Zundel) – 4:39
8. "Homecoming Song" (Robbie James) – 5:01
9. "Face of Appalachia" (Lowell George, John Sebastian) – 5:26
10. "Naming Names" (S. Lynch, P. White) – 4:39
11. "Inexorably Yours" (John Joseph Gordon) – 3:16

Limited edition bonus disc - IX

1. "The Water Is Wide" (Traditional) – 3:57
2. "Square Moon" (K. Govett, G. Stapleton, R. James) – 4:06
3. "Doomsday Lullaby" (Danny Bruce Peck) – 4:26
4. "Going Back to My Roots" (Dozier Lamont Herbert) – 5:26
5. "The Weavers Song" – 1:52
6. "The Day You Went Away (French Version)" (Batson, Jonathon; French lyrics by Wendy Matthews) – 4:35

== Credits ==
- Wendy Matthews — vocals
- Jon Farriss — drums, percussion
- Garry Gary Beers — bass
- Booker T. Jones — keyboards
- Robbie James — guitar

== Release history ==
Region	Date	Label	Format	Catalogue
Australia	28 September 1992	RooART	CD, Cassette	4509905472
Australia	21 September 1993	Atlantic	CD	92269
Australia	9 December 1996	BMG	CD	74321444142

== Charts ==
Chart (1992–94)	Peak position
Australian Albums (ARIA)	2

=== End of year charts ===
Chart (1992)	Peak position
Australian ARIA Albums Chart	33
Chart (1993)	Peak position
Australian ARIA Albums Chart	26

== Certifications ==
Region	Certification	Certified units/sales
Australia (ARIA)	3× Platinum	210,000^{^}
^{^} Shipments figures based on certification alone.
