= Sensual Sensual =

Studio album by B-Tribe
- Released: 1998
- Label: Atlantic Records
- Producer: Claus Zundel

B-Tribe chronology
Suave Suave (1995)	Sensual Sensual (1998)	¡Spiritual, Spiritual! (2001)

Professional ratings
Review scores
Source	Rating
AllMusic	4/5 stars

Sensual Sensual is the third album by B-Tribe, released in 1998.

== Critical reception ==
The Orange County Register wrote that "while the flamenco-meets-techno element is still evident, this album is not even particularly danceable in parts, but the sound is now warmer, more lyrical and more melodic." The Evening Post dismissed "the loquacious Latino wailings and hobbled flamenco" as "glum revisitations of their earlier efforts—Suave Suave without the stomp and Fiesta Fatale minus its primal burn." The Knoxville News Sentinel concluded: "The album is monochromatic and derivative. Zundel only shows imagination in his exploitation of flamenco guitar, and he uses that gimmick ad nauseum [sic]."

== Track listing ==
1. "Overture (Concierto De Aranjuez)" - 4:04
2. "Alegria" - 5:59
3. "Sometimes" - 5:14
4. "Hablame" - 4:07
5. "Sensual Sensual" - 6:03
6. "Zapateado" - 5:51
7. "Tribute to J.S. Bach" - 3:19
8. "La Guapa" - 3:29
9. "Deseperada" - 3:48
10. "Sa Trincha" - 4:10
11. "Ahoy Ahoy" - 5:28
12. "Ultima Cancion" - 3:55
13. "La Unica Excusa..." - 3:13
