= Sit and Wait =

1989 single by Sydney Youngblood

Single by Sydney Youngblood

from the album Feeling Free
- B-side: "Feeling Free"
- Released: 1989
- Genre: R&B, Dance, Pop dance, house
- Length: 3:56
- Label: Circa; Virgin
- Songwriters: Ralf Hamm; Mike Staab; Sydney Youngblood; Claus Zundel
- Producer: Claus Zundel

Sydney Youngblood singles chronology
"If Only I Could" (1989)	"Sit and Wait" (1989)	"I'd Rather Go Blind" (1989)

"Sit and Wait" is a song recorded by American-German singer Sydney Youngblood. It was co-written by him and produced by Claus Zundel. The song was released in 1989 as the second single from his debut album, Feeling Free (1989), and was released in late 1989 and early 1990 in European countries. Like his previous single "If Only I Could", it had success on the charts, reaching the top 10 in Austria, the Netherlands, Sweden, Switzerland and West Germany. A music video was also produced to promote the single. It features the singer dressed as a military, performing and dancing with dancers at a cafe.

== Critical reception ==
Paul Lester from Melody Maker wrote, "'Sit and Wait' is about as likely to get the nation's heels galloping as the Grace Jones record." Lola Borg from Smash Hits felt "it has an infectiously lovely rune, a haunting piano and Syd sounding like he's just won the pools so exuberant is his singing, and it all ends up making you feel like the world is a somehow a much nicer place." David Giles of Music Week considered "Sit and Wait" a "strong song" with a "highly competent pop/soul tune" and a "clever instrumentation" which recalls Spandau Ballet or Black. A review in pan-European magazine Music & Media considered "Sit and Wait" as "simply not as good as "If Only I Could" but then again not many songs are", and also deemed it "probably a hit but [Youngblood] can do better".

== Track listings ==
These are the formats and track listings of major single releases of "Sit and Wait".

- 7-inch and CD single
1. "Sit and Wait" – 3:56
2. "Feeling Free" – 4:00
- CD maxi
1. "Sit and Wait" (Stationary to Stationary mix) – 7:06
2. "Feeling Free" (the "Jazzy Who?" mix) – 6:00
3. "If Only I Could" (the original 12-inch) – 6:30
- 12-inch maxi
1. "Sit and Wait" (Stationary to Stationary mix) – 7:06
2. "Sit and Wait" (dub) – 4:56
3. "Feeling Free" (the "Jazzy Who?" mix) – 6:00
- 12-inch maxi
1. "Sit and Wait" (Stationary to Stationary mix) – 7:04
2. "Feeling Free" (LP version) – 5:02
3. "Feeling Free" (the "Jazzy Who?" mix) – 5:55

== Credits ==
- Written by Claus Zundel, Mike Staab, Ralf Hamm and Sydney Youngblood
- Remix by Claus Zundel
- Artwork by Michael•Nash Assoc.
- Photography by Enrique Badulescu
- Arranged and produced by Claus Zundel

== Charts ==
=== Weekly charts ===
Weekly chart performance for "Sit and Wait"
Chart (1989–1990)	Peak position
Australia (ARIA)	59
Austria (Ö3 Austria Top 40)	2
Belgium (Ultratop 50 Flanders)	2
Denmark (IFPI)	14
Europe (Eurochart Hot 100)	10
France (SNEP)	21
Ireland (IRMA)	15
Italy (Musica e dischi)	16
Netherlands (Dutch Top 40)	6
Netherlands (Single Top 100)	7
Sweden (Sverigetopplistan)	2
Switzerland (Schweizer Hitparade)	6
UK Singles (OCC)	16
UK Dance (Music Week)	10
West Germany (GfK)	2

=== Year-end charts ===
Year-end chart performance for "Sit and Wait"
Chart (1990)	Position
Austria (Ö3 Austria Top 40)	25
Belgium (Ultratop)	47
Europe (Eurochart Hot 100)	54
Europe (European Airplay Top 50)	13
Europe (European Hit Radio)	10
Europe (European Dance Singles)	3
Germany (Media Control)	30
Sweden (Topplistan)	95
