= Beat the Border =

Studio album by Geoffrey Oryema
- Released: 1993
- Length: 41:37
- Label: Real World
- Producer: David Bottrill, Bob Ezrin

Geoffrey Oryema chronology
Exile (1990)	Beat the Border (1993)	Night to Night (1996)

Beat the Border is the second album by the Ugandan musician Geoffrey Oryema, released in 1993. Oryema supported the album by playing the 1993 WOMAD Festival.

== Production ==
The album was produced by David Bottrill and Bob Ezrin. Oryema sang in Acholi and English. Brian Eno, Manu Katché, and Ayub Ogada contributed to the album. Jean-Pierre Alarcen played guitar; Oryema played a seven-string nanga.

== Critical reception ==
Professional ratings
Review scores
Source	Rating
AllMusic	4.5/5 stars
The Tampa Tribune	4/4 stars

The Gazette wrote that "'Kel Kweyo', 'Lapwony' and 'Lajok' are stunning examples of modern African pop at its best," but noted that Oryema may regret "his own creative concessions with the Real World gang." The Edmonton Journal determined that Oryema's "soft, English delivery, gentle, funky beats and melodic hooks offer the most easily accessible sounds on the [Real World] label."

The Press-Enterprise opined that "Oryema's golden voice hovers like a mythic bird over songs that play like shafts of light and rhythm falling on the floor of a rainforest." The Tampa Tribune concluded that "the singer's rich vocals—alternately deep and soaring—are the continuous, seductive cord around which this variegated music is wrapped."

AllMusic wrote: "This highly creative mix of Ugandan songs and laid-back rock should have been a disaster, since the genres meet on the field of ambient dreams ... But expat Ugandan Geoffrey Oryema neither tries mainstreaming African sources to fit rock fissures nor piles extra beats and instruments on the heads of reluctant Western forms." The Toronto Sun listed Beat the Border as the 8th best album of 1993.

== Track listing ==
1. "The River"
2. "Kel Kweyo"
3. "Market Day"
4. "Lapwony"
5. "Umoja"
6. "Gang Deyo"
7. "Hard Labour"
8. "Payira Wind"
9. "Lajok"
10. "Nomad"
