= B-Tribe =

German musical project

B-Tribe, or The Barcelona Tribe of Soulsters, is a musical project of the German-born musicians and producers Claus Zundel, Markus Staab and Ralf Hamm ("The Brave"), who are also known for their Sacred Spirit project. Driven by the use of classical Spanish guitar and other elements of flamenco music, mixed with trip hop-like ambient tunes. All the albums were recorded in Zundels's own studio on Ibiza, Spain. Spanish musician Paco Fernandez plays guitars and cello parts are performed by Frankfurt Radio Orchestra member Eric Plummetaz. Singer Deborah Blando has also collaborated.

== Career ==
B-Tribe first hit the music scene in 1993 with ¡Fiesta Fatal!, the single of that title "¡Fiesta Fatal!" becoming a #1 dance hit in Europe. It peaked at #64 in the UK Singles Chart in October 1993. B-Tribe was born into a niche (coming out that same year was Enigma's The Cross of Changes, while Deep Forest's self-titled album had come out in late 1993). "¡Fiesta Fatal!" and Suave Suave (which was released in 1995) became part of a less commercial side of the so-called World music scene that was growing in popularity in the United States during the mid-1990s. The Brave released the third B-Tribe album Sensual Sensual. Their popularity would be evidenced in 1997, arguably the peak of the genre's popularity, with the release of the first Pure Moods album. B-Tribe did not make the cut for Pure Moods the album, but the rendition of "She Moved Through the Fair" from 2001's ¡Spiritual, Spiritual! was featured on the compilation Pure Moods IV.

The album ¡Spiritual, Spiritual! is the most ambient album by the project. Only a handful of tracks feature a distinct drumbeat and the cello features in only one song on the album. B-Tribe's next album was the aptly titled 5 in 2003; it features songwriting and vocal contributions by African supermodel Luna Mohamed. The sixth B-Tribe album was released twice – as a limited release in 2007 on Macao Cafe, and a re-release on Holophon in December 2008.

== Discography ==
=== Albums ===
- Fiesta Fatal!|¡Fiesta Fatal! (1993)
- Suave Suave (1995)
- Sensual Sensual (1998)
- ¡Spiritual, Spiritual! (2001)
- 5 (2003)
- Volume 6 (2008)
- Angels (2025) Europe Distribution Only
- Barcelona After Midnight (2026)

=== Singles ===
- "¡Fiesta Fatal!" (1993)
- "Nadie Entiende (Nobody Understands)" (1993)
- "You Won't See Me Cry" (1993)
- "Nanita (Spanish Lullaby)" (1995)
- "Que Mala Vida" (1996)
