= She Moved Through the Fair =

Traditional Irish folk song

"She Moved Through the Fair" (Roud 861) (also called "Our Wedding Day", "My Young Love Said to Me", "I Once Had a True Love", "She Moves Through the Fair" or "She Moved Through the Faire") is a traditional Irish folk song, with a number of iterations, that has been performed and recorded by various artists. The narrator sees his lover move away from him through the fair, after telling him that since her family will approve, "it will not be long [love] 'til our wedding day". She returns as a ghost at night, and repeats the words again, intimating her own tragic death and the couple's potential reunion in the afterlife. There are numerous alternate versions, some sung about a male lover, with different lyrics, such as "Our Wedding Day" and "My Young Love Said to Me", among others.

== Origins and structure ==
"She Moved Through the Fair" has been found both in Ireland and in Scotland, but pieces of the song were apparently first collected in County Donegal by Longford poet Padraic Colum and the musicologist Herbert Hughes.

The melody is in Mixolydian mode (major scale with a flattened seventh—a fairly common mode within Irish and Scottish musical traditions), placing a large emphasis on the 1st, 4th, 5th and 7th chords of the scale. John Loesberg speculated: "From its strange, almost Eastern sounding melody, it appears to be an air of some antiquity," but he does not define its age any more precisely.

== Origins and publishing of the lyrics ==
The lyrics were first published in Hughes' Irish Country Songs, published by Boosey & Hawkes in 1909. A common version goes as follows:

My young love said to me, "My mother won’t mind". "And my father won’t slight you, for your lack of kine." And she stepped away from me, and this, she did say: "It will not be long, love, 'til our wedding day."

She stepped away from me, and she moved through the fair. And, fondly, I watched her move here and move there. And then she moved onward, with one star awake. Like the swan in the evening moves over the lake.

Last night, she came to me; she came softly in. So softly she came, that her feet made no din. And she stepped closer to me, and this, she did say: "It will not be long, love, 'til our wedding day."

In a letter published in The Irish Times in 1970, Padraic Colum stated that he was the author of all but the final verse. He also described how Herbert Hughes collected the tune and then he, Colum, had kept the last verse of a traditional song and written a couple of verses to fit the music.

One verse was not included in the first publication: Colum soon realised that he had not put in the poem the fact that the woman had died before the marriage, and so he wrote the verse that begins: "The people were saying, that no two were e'er wed, but one had a sorrow that never was said ..." and sent it on to Hughes, too late for publication in that particular collection. This extra verse was published in other collections, along with the other three verses. The lyrics were also published in Colum's collection Wild Earth: And Other Poems (1916), though the traditional origin of the final verse is not mentioned there.

In the course of the same Irish Times correspondence, however, another music collector, Proinsias Ó Conluain, said he had recorded a song called "She Went Through the Fair", with words the same as the other three verses of "She Moved Through the Fair", sung by an old man who told him that "the song was a very old one" and that he had learned it as a young man from a basket-weaver in Glenavy.

== "Our Wedding Day" version ==
Irish singer Paddy Tunney related how Colum wrote an alternate version called upon returning from a literary gathering in Donegal with Herbert Hughes, among others. However, as the melody remains the same, Tunney suggested that it would be more accurate to say that Colum simply added new lyrics to an existing traditional song that, by then, had generated many variations throughout Ireland

Tunney, himself, collected a version from an Irish singer named Barney McGarvey. This version, similarly to the lyrics of "Our Wedding Day", was called "I Once Had a True Love". The opening four lines are highly reminiscent of "She Moved Through the Fair", and the second four lines are unmistakably taken from that composition.

The first verse says:

I once had a sweet-heart, I loved her so well.
I loved her far better than my tongue could tell.
Her parents, they slight me, for my want of gear;
So adieu to you, Molly, since you are not here.
I dreamed last night that my true love came in.
So softly she came that her feet made no din.
She stepped up to me, and this she did say:
"It will not be long, love, till our wedding day…"

The remaining two verses are quite different. Tunney also points to a version of the song that he obtained from his mother, who called it "My Young Love Said to Me", which recalls lyrics from the alternate version, as well. The first verse is virtually the same as Colum's, but the latter three verses are quite different:

My young love said to me, "My mother won't mind…
And my father won't slight you for your lack of kind."
And she went away from me, and this she did say:
"It will not be long, now, till our wedding day."
She went away from me, and she moved through the fair;
Where hand-slapping dealers' loud shouts rent the air.
The sunlight around her did sparkle and play,
Saying, "…it will not be long, now, till our wedding day."

When dew falls on meadow, and moths fill the night;
When glow of the greesagh on hearth throws half-light,
I'll slip from the casement, and we'll run away.
And it will not be long, love, till our wedding day.
According to promise, at midnight he rose;
But all that he found was the downfolded clothes.
The sheets, they lay empty; 'twas plain for to see.
And out of the window, with another, went she.

== Variants and related songs ==
One variant of the song is called "Our Wedding Day". A related song, "Out of the Window", was collected by Sam Henry from Eddie Butcher of Magilligan in Northern Ireland in around 1930 and published in 1979. Yet another song, "I Once Had a True Love", also appears to be related, as it shares some lyrics with "She Moved Through the Fair".

"I Was in Chains", written by Gavin Sutherland and recorded by The Sutherland Brothers on their album The Sutherland Brothers Band (1972), has a similar tune but completely different words. Paul Young covered this song on his album The Secret of Association (1985).

The 1989 song "Belfast Child" by Simple Minds incorporates the melody of "She Moved Through the Fair".

In the 1990s the tune was used in the winning entry in the Comórtas na nAmhrán Nuachumtha ("Competition for newly composed songs") in Ráth Cairn. The subject of the song, Bailéad an Phíolóta ("The Ballad of the Pilot"), was a plane crash that took place in 1989 on an unlit runway on Árainn Mhór.

Other name variants include "She Moved Thru' the Fair", "She Moved Thro' the Fair", and "He Moved Through the Fair".

== Performances and recordings ==
Scottish tenor Sydney MacEwan recorded the song in 1936 and Irish tenor John McCormack recorded it in 1941.

In 1952, folklorist Peter Kennedy recorded the McPeake Family singing a version based on that of Margaret Barry entitled "Our Wedding Day." It featured a bagpipe accompaniment by Francis McPeake, II. The traditional singer Paddy Tunney learned "She Moved Through the Fair" in County Fermanagh and recorded it in 1965. Other singers who sang it in the 1950s and the 1960s included Patrick Galvin, Dominic Behan and Anne Briggs. It was popular among members of the Traveller community in Ireland at that time.

Fairport Convention recorded the song in 1968, adapting the style of the song from the Traveller Margaret Barry, though she herself had learned it from the John McCormack vinyl recording. Former Fairport Convention guitarist and songwriter Richard Thompson regularly includes the song in concert performances. Also of note are the recordings of the song by Alan Stivell in 1973. Art Garfunkel (formerly of Simon & Garfunkel) recorded a particularly lush version on his album Watermark (1977), which featured Irish traditional band The Chieftains and was arranged by Paddy Moloney and Jimmy Webb.

Versions of the song recorded by Sinéad O'Connor (as used on the soundtrack of the film Michael Collins), Trees and Nana Mouskouri change the gender of the pronouns, so the song became "He Moved Through the Fair". O'Connor's and Trees' versions keep the original title even so, but Mouskouri changes it. In a 2015 interview, O'Connor expressed regret for having changed the gender. An alternative version of the lyrics is also used in Mary Black's version of the song.

In June 2016, the BBC TV series The Living and the Dead premiered a version of the song sung by Elizabeth Fraser in collaboration with the Insects.

=== Other notable versions ===
Artist	Title (if different)	Album	Year	Notes
10,000 Maniacs		Twice Told Tales	2015	
All About Eve		All About Eve	1988	
Arbouretum		Covered in Leaves	2012	
B-Tribe		¡Spiritual, Spiritual!	2001	
Margaret Barry			1951 (approx)	Available in multiple later collections.
Dominic Behan		Irish Songs	1958	
Boyzone		A Different Beat	1996	
Mary Black		Collected	1984	Sings an alternative version of the lyrics
Máire Brennan			1992	
Jeremy Brett		Twiggy	1975	
Anne Briggs			1963	
Sarah Brightman	"He Moved Through the Fair"		1998	
Jim Causley	"She Moved Through the Fair / Germany Clockmaker"	Dumnonia	2011	Devonshire variant
Celtic Thunder		Mythology	2013	
Celtic Woman		Celtic Woman	2004	
Tony Christie and Ranagri		The Great Irish Songbook	2015	
Charlotte Church		Charlotte Church	2000	
Slaid Cleaves		Dark River (compilation album)	2011	
Shirley Collins		Shirley Sings Irish (EP)	1963	
Andrea Corr		Celtic Skies (compilation album)	2012	
Culann's Hounds		One for the Road	2006	
Alfred Deller with Desmond Dupre		Folk Songs	1972	
Barbara Dickson		The Right Moment	1986	
Cara Dillon		Hill of Thieves	2009	
Donal Donnelly		Take the Name of Donnelly	1968	
Donovan	"One Star Awake"		2005	
The Doug Anthony Allstars		Blue	1991	Unreleased album
Enter the Haggis		Casualties of Retail	2005	
Eyeless in Gaza		Back from the Rains	1986	
Fairport Convention	"She Moves Through the Fair"	What We Did on Our Holidays	1968	
Marianne Faithfull		North Country Maid	1966	Re-recorded for Blazing Away (1990)
Órla Fallon		The Water Is Wide	2000	
Elizabeth Fraser with The Insects		Version for TV series The Living and the Dead	2016	
Rory Gallagher with Bert Jansch		Wheels Within Wheels	2003	
Art Garfunkel (featuring The Chieftains)		Watermark	1977	Arranged by Paddy Moloney and Jimmy Webb
Lesley Garrett		A North Country Lass	2012	
Davy Graham		From a London Hootenanny (EP) and British TV program 'Hullabaloo' on 2 November 1963.	1962	Guitar arrangement. Possibly the earliest recorded use of DADGAD tuning (in fact CGCFGC with a capo on second fret). See also Led Zeppelin, White Summer, below.
Cy Grant		Cool Folk!	1964	
Josh Groban		All That Echoes	2013	
Alan Hacker and Tony Coe	"One Star Awake"	Sun, Moon and Stars	1999	
Carolyn Hester		Carolyn Hester	1960	
Peter Hollens		Peter Hollens	2014	
Jam Nation		Way Down Below Buffalo Hell	1993	Arranged by Caroline Lavelle
Bert Jansch		Toy Balloon	1998	
Anthony Kearns		The Very Best of the Irish Tenors	2002	
Camilla Kerslake		Camilla Kerslake	2009	
The King's Singers		Watching the White Wheat	1985	Also on Spirit Voices (1997)
John Langstaff		Nottamun Town: British and American Folk Songs	2003	Remastered from 1950s
Led Zeppelin	"White Summer"	Coda	1993	Guitar-only arrangement based
Johnny Logan		The Irish Connection 2	2013	
Michael Londra		Celt	2006	
Benjamin Luxon		Simple Gifts: Benjamin Luxon and Bill Crofut sing Folks Songs at Tanglewood	1990	
Shane MacGowan and the Popes		"Rock 'N' Roll Paddy" (single)	1998	B-side
John Martyn		London Conversation – Remastered	2005	
Loreena McKennitt		Elemental	1985	Also on Nights from the Alhambra (2007)
Mediæval Bæbes		The Huntress	2012	
Rhys Meirion		Celticae – Cymru, Alba, Eire	2007	
Van Morrison and The Chieftains		Irish Heartbeat	1988	Live version in the video Van Morrison: The Concert (1990)
Nana Mouskouri	"He Moved Through the Fair"	Songs of the British Isles	1976	
No Carrier		Ghosts of the West Coast (EP)	2015	
Carol Noonan		Absolution	1995	
Odetta		One Grain of Sand	1963	
Hazel O'Connor			1995	
Sinéad O'Connor	"He Moved Through the Fair"		1996	Sang "He Moved Through the Fair"; used in the soundtrack of the film Michael Collins
Majella O'Donnell		At Last	2006	
Mary O'Hara		Songs of Erin	1956	
Maureen O'Hara	"He Moved Through the Fair"	Maureen O'Hara Sings Her Favourite Irish Songs	1961	
Mike Oldfield	"She Moves Through the Fair"	Voyager	1996	
Terry Oldfield		Celtic Spirit	2009	
Siobhan Owen		Celestial Echoes	2009	
Pentangle		In the Round	1986	
Marina Prior	Part of "Celtic Medley"	Marina Prior Live	2013	"Celtic Medley": "He Moved Through the Fair" / "Heigh Diddle Dum" / "Danny Boy"
Jean Redpath		Songs of Love, Lilt and Laughter	1963	
Maggie Reilly		Elena	1996	
Rua		Rua	2001	
Andreas Scholl		Wayfaring Stranger	2001	
Scooter	"Ratty's Revenge"	The Ultimate Aural Orgasm	2007	
Pete Seeger		Love Songs for Friends and Foes	1956	
Feargal Sharkey		Songs from the Mardi Gras	1991	
Fionnuala Sherry		Songs from Before	2010	
Wayne Shorter		Alegría	2003	Instrumental version
Alan Stivell		Chemins de Terre	1973	
Trees		Garden of Jane Delawney	1970	Sang "He Moved Through the Fair"
Hayley Westenra		Odyssey	2005	
Roger Whittaker		Folksongs of Our Island Volume 1	1977	
Nyle Wolfe		Home Ground	2009	
Brenda Wootton		So Long	2024	Presumably recorded in the 1970s or 1980s.
The Yardbirds	"White Summer"	Little Games	1967	
Charlie Zahm		The Celtic Balladeer	1999	
Oli Steadman		365 Days of Folk	2024	
