= The Day You Went Away =

1992 single by Soul Family Sensation

Single by Soul Family Sensation

from the album New Wave
- A-side: "Other Stuff"
- Released: 24 February 1992
- Length: 4:22
- Label: One Little Indian
- Songwriters: Guy Batson, Johnny Male
- Producers: Steward Brian Pugsley, Guy Batson, Johnny Male

Soul Family Sensation singles chronology
"Perfect Life" / "747 Tonight" (1991)	"The Day You Went Away" / "Other Stuff" (1992)

"The Day You Went Away" is a song by English pop/soul group Soul Family Sensation, released in February 1992 as the third single from the group's 1991 debut studio album, New Wave, on One Little Indian Records. It was written by Guy Batson and Johnny Male. Despite the success of their first single, "I Don't Even Know If I Should Call You Baby", which peaked at No. 49 on the UK Singles Chart, "The Day You Went Away" did not chart. In 1992, Australian singer-songwriter Wendy Matthews covered the song, which reached No. 2 on the Australian Singles Chart and won two ARIA Music Awards.

== Track listings ==
7-inch single

A. "The Day You Went Away"
AA. "Other Stuff" (Piccadilly Line mix)

12-inch and CD single

1. "The Day You Went Away"
2. "Other Stuff" (Circle Line mix)
3. "Other Stuff" (Piccadilly Line mix)
4. "Other Stuff" (Central Line mix)

== Wendy Matthews version ==
"The Day You Went Away"

Single by Wendy Matthews

from the album Lily
- Released: 17 August 1992
- Studio: Rhinoceros (Sydney, Australia)
- Length: 4:44
- Label: rooART
- Songwriters: Guy Batson, Johnny Male
- Producer: T-Bone Burnett

Wendy Matthews singles chronology
"Let's Kiss (Like Angels Do)" (1991)	"The Day You Went Away" (1992)	"Friday's Child" (1993)

Wendy Matthews' cover was released 17 August 1992 by rooArt as the lead single from her second solo studio album, Lily (1992). The song debuted on the Australian ARIA Singles Chart in August 1992, eventually peaking at No. 2 in December of the same year. This is Matthews' highest-charting single on the Australian chart. In the United Kingdom and Europe, the song was released on rooART in 1993 but was not a hit. Matthews subsequently included the song on her 1999 Greatest Hits album, Stepping Stones, and her 2007 compilation album, The Essential Wendy Matthews.

"The Day You Went Away" won two ARIA Music Awards at the ARIA Music Awards of 1993: one for Single of the Year and one for Highest Selling Single.

=== Composition ===
"The Day You Went Away" is performed in a slow 4/4 time with a vocal range of E4 to C♯6.

=== Track listings ===
Australian CD and cassette single
No.	Title	Writer(s)	Length
1.	"The Day You Went Away"	Guy Batson, Johnny Male
2.	"I Don't Want to Be with Nobody but You" (recorded live Melbourne, May 1991)	Eddie Floyd
3.	"Won't Let Me Be (Georgia's Song)" (recorded live Melbourne, May 1991)	Andrew Duffield, James Valentine, Wendy Matthews

Australian 7-inch single
No.	Title	Writer(s)	Length
1.	"The Day You Went Away"	Batson, Male
2.	"I Don't Want to Be with Nobody but You" (recorded live Melbourne, May 1991)	Floyd

=== Charts ===
==== Weekly charts ====
Chart (1992)	Peak position
Australia (ARIA)	2

==== Year-end charts ====
Chart (1992)	Position
Australia (ARIA)	8

=== Sales and certifications ===
Region	Certification	Certified units/sales
Australia (ARIA)	Platinum	70,000^{^}
^{^} Shipments figures based on certification alone.
