= Feeling Free (Sydney Youngblood album) =

Studio album by Sydney Youngblood
- Released: 1989, 1990 (North America)
- Label: Circa; Virgin
- Producer: Claus Zundel

Sydney Youngblood chronology
Feeling Free (1989)	Passion, Grace and Serious Bass... (1991)

Professional ratings
Review scores
Source	Rating
AllMusic	3/5 stars
Number One	3/5 stars
Record Mirror	4/5 stars

Feeling Free is the debut album by American-German singer Sydney Youngblood, released in 1989. It includes the singles "If Only I Could" and "Sit and Wait", which both reached the top 10 of a number of charts in Europe. Other singles released from the album include covers of Bill Withers' "Ain't No Sunshine" and Etta James' "I'd Rather Go Blind". In 1990, the album was released in North America with a rearranged track listing, under the title Sydney Youngblood.

== Track listing ==
All tracks written by Claus Zundel, Markus Staab, Ralf Hamm and Sydney Youngblood, except where noted.

1. "Feeling Free" (featuring Elaine Hudson)
2. "If Only I Could"
3. "I'd Rather Go Blind" (Etta James, Ellington Jordan, Billy Foster)
4. "Sit and Wait"
5. "Kiss and Say Goodbye" (Winfred Lovett)
6. "Ain't No Sunshine" (Bill Withers)
7. "I'm Your Lover"
8. "Not Just a Lover But a Friend"
9. "Congratulations"
10. "Could It Be (I'm in Love)"
11. "That Was Yesterday"
12. "Good Times Bad Times"

North American version – Sydney Youngblood

1. "If Only I Could"
2. "Don't Keep Me Waiting" (Dennis Morgan, Rob Fisher, Simon Climie)
3. "Not Just a Lover But a Friend"
4. "I'd Rather Go Blind"
5. "Sit and Wait"
6. "Ain't No Sunshine"
7. "Feeling Free"
8. "Kiss and Say Goodbye"
9. "Congratulations"
10. "Good Times and Bad Times"

== Charts and certifications ==
=== Weekly charts ===
Feeling Free

Chart (1989)	Peak position
Australian Albums Chart	59
Austrian Albums Chart	7
Dutch Albums Chart	56
German Albums Chart	9
New Zealand Albums Chart	19
Swedish Albums Chart	5
Swiss Albums Chart	9
UK Albums Chart	23

Sydney Youngblood

Chart (1990)	Peak position
US Billboard 200	185
US Top R&B/Hip-Hop Albums	72

=== Certifications ===
Region	Certification	Certified units/sales
Germany (BVMI)	Gold	250,000^{^}
Switzerland (IFPI Switzerland)	Gold	25,000^{^}
United Kingdom (BPI)	Gold	100,000^{^}
^{^} Shipments figures based on certification alone.
