= No Carrier (band) =

no:carrier
- Also known as: Fast Delay (1995)
- Genres: Dark wave, Synthpop, Pop music
- Years active: 1995–present
- Labels: Electric Heresy
- Members: Chris Wirsig; Cynthia Wechselberger
- Past members: Stefan Ritter
- Website: www.nocarriermusic.com

No Carrier (stylized as no:carrier) are a German-American Electro pop band, now residing in San Francisco and Los Angeles, that was founded in 1995 by singer, keyboardist, and producer Chris Wirsig and singer Stefan Ritter under the name Fast Delay, but soon renamed to no:carrier. In 2001 Cynthia Wechselberger replaced Stefan Ritter as singer.

no:carrier have released five studio albums and several EPs and Singles to date. Their last studio album Wisdom & Failure was released on April 29, 2014.

== History ==
no:carrier started off in Germany as an EBM band, consisting of Chris Wirsig and Stefan Ritter. Their first official release was the tape death:row in 1996, followed by processing in fall 1997, which was a solo project by Chris Wirsig after Stefan Ritter had left the band.

In 2001 singer Cynthia Wechselberger joined as the new singer and their style changed from EBM to Electro pop, Synthpop and Dark wave. In March 2002 the band released the album My Own Dream on their own label Electric Heresy. It received good reviews in several German electronic and dark music magazines, like Orkus, Electrocution, Dark Obsession and Black.

After Electric Heresy had been shut down for the time being in September 2003, no:carrier signed with the German label electric stars that re-released My Own Dream with a new packaging. In 2005 the band released the song Mr. Einstein, that was featured on NovaTune's Einstein tribute album mc2. Two years later Chris Wirsig re-activated the label Electric Heresy and re-released the first album in its original format including the 8-page booklet. One year later no:carrier wrote the music for the song Defensless on the album The 11th Hour by the Synthpop band Psyche.

Completely new songs were released in 2009: After the two digital singles Cask Of Wonders and Sin Of Regret the new album Between The Chairs was published by the end of the year. Also this album got good reviews in European magazines, e.g. in Sonic Seducer, Side-Line, Dark Spy, madgoth.de and Amboss-Mag. In the summer of 2011 Perfectly Safe, a third digital single from the album was released along with a video.

In 2012 Chris Wirsig relocated to San Francisco while Cynthia Wechselberger stayed in Germany, but the band decided to continue nevertheless.

From June 2013 on no:carrier set the stage for the publication of their third album Wisdom & Failure by releasing the singles/EPs Last Scene, The Nine Days' Queen (devoted to the life of Lady Jane Grey), and Confession. Wisdom & Failure was released on Electric Heresy for the US market on April 29 and in Europe on May 2, 2014. The publication was accompanied by a tour through California and Las Vegas, the official CD release party was at the Viper Room in West Hollywood. The performance from this night was released on the free download Live At The Viper Room, Los Angeles.

The album, as well as the EP and the singles, were reviewed in many publications in North America and Europe, such as The Big Takeover Side-Line Punknews.org Soletron Digital Journal

In May 2015 the band released four cover version (a first for them) of rather unusual songs for an electro band ("The Boys of Summer (song)" by Don Henley, "California" by Belinda Carlisle, "Room With A View" by Tony Carey and the Irish traditional "She Moved Through The Fair", which melody also was used by the Simple Minds in their song "Belfast Child"). This EP, "Ghosts Of The West Coast," is showing the dark side of California and the American Dream, says the band. For the first time no:carrier also worked with guest singers from California on this release including Kalib DuArte from the band Audio Terrorist.

After Chris Wirsig's move to Los Angeles the band grew with more guest vocalists and released the album "Broken Rainbow - Songs for an Apocalyptic World" in November 2016. The song Your Heroin was released as video single shortly before that. Apart from Cynthia Wechselberger and Chris Wirsig the current lineup of no:carrier also lists the singers Lauralee Brown, Liza Marie Sparks, Scilla Hess and Bobby Halvorson. With "Bad Moon Rising" the album also contains another cover version.

== Discography ==
- 1996: death:row
- 1997: Processing
- 2002: My Own Dream
- 2004: My Own Dream (re-release on Electric Stars)
- 2005: Mr. Einstein - Dub 2008
- 2009: Cask of Wonders
- 2010: Sin of Regret
- 2011: Between the Chairs
- 2011: Perfectly Safe
- 2013: Last Scene (limited)
- 2013: The Nine Days Queen
- 2014: Confession EP
- 2014: Wisdom & Failure
- 2014: Live at the Viper Room, Los Angeles
- 2015: Ghosts of the West Coast
- 2016: Broken Rainbow - Songs for an Apocalyptic World
