= Chants and Dances of the Native Americans =

1994 studio album by Sacred Spirit

Studio album by Sacred Spirit
- Released: 1994
- Genre: New-age
- Length: 54:31
- Label: Virgin

Sacred Spirit chronology
| Chants and Dances of the Native Americans (1994) | Sacred Spirit (Dance Remixes) (1995) |

Chants and Dances of the Native Americans, also referred to as Sacred Spirit, is the debut studio album by German musical project Sacred Spirit, released in 1994.

== Track listing ==
1. "How the West Was Lost (Intro and Prelude)" – 2:59
2. "Winter Ceremony (Tor-Cheney-Nahana)" – 6:56
3. "The Counterclockwise Circle Dance (Ly-O-Lay Ale Loya)" – 5:10
4. "Celebrate Wild Rice (Ya-Na-Hana)" – 7:05
5. "The Cradlesong (Dawa)" – 4:17
6. "Advice for the Young (Gitchi-Manidoo)" – 6:02
7. "Wishes of Happiness & Prosperity (Yeha-Noha)" – 4:03
8. "Elevation (Ta-Was-Ne)" – 2:39
9. "Intertribal Song to Stop the Rain (Heya-Hee)" – 7:45
10. "Heal the Soul (Shamanic Chant No.5)" – 1:20
11. "Brandishing the Tomahawk (Yo-Hey-O-Hee)" – 6:15

== Charts ==
Weekly chart performance for Chants and Dances of the Native Americans
| Chart (1994–1995) | Peak position |
|---|---|
| Australian Albums (ARIA) | 24 |
| Belgian Albums (Ultratop Flanders) | 6 |
| Belgian Albums (Ultratop Wallonia) | 1 |
| French Albums (SNEP) | 1 |
| German Albums (Offizielle Top 100) | 9 |
| New Zealand Albums (RMNZ) | 12 |
| Norwegian Albums (VG-lista) | 28 |
| Dutch Albums (Album Top 100) | 25 |
| Swedish Albums (Sverigetopplistan) | 9 |
| Swiss Albums (Schweizer Hitparade) | 8 |
| United Kingdom Albums (OCC) | 9 |

== Certifications and sales ==
Certifications and sales for Chants and Dances of the Native Americans
| Region | Certification | Certified units/sales |
|---|---|---|
| Belgium (BRMA) | Platinum | 50,000^{*} |
| France (SNEP) | 2× Platinum | 600,000^{*} |
| Germany (BVMI) | Gold | 250,000^{^} |
| Spain (Promusicae) | Platinum | 100,000^{^} |
| Sweden (GLF) | Gold | 50,000^{^} |
| United Kingdom (BPI) | Platinum | 300,000^{^} |
| United States | — | 211,621 |
Summaries
| Europe (IFPI) | Platinum | 1,000,000^{*} |
| Worldwide (as of 1996) | — | 1,750,000 |
^{*} Sales figures based on certification alone.^{^} Shipments figures based on certification alone.
