= If Only I Could =

1989 single by Sydney Youngblood

Single by Sydney Youngblood

from the album Feeling Free
- B-side: "Spooky"
- Released: 24 July 1989
- Genre: R&B; dance; house
- Length: 3:30
- Label: Virgin
- Songwriters: Claus Zundel; Mike Staab; Sydney Youngblood; Ralf Hamm
- Producer: Claus Zundel

Sydney Youngblood singles chronology
"Congratulations" (1988)	"If Only I Could" (1989)	"Sit and Wait" (1989)

Music video
- "If Only I Could" on YouTube

"If Only I Could" is a song by American-German singer-songwriter Sydney Youngblood. The track was co-written by Youngblood with Markus Friedrich Staab, Ralf Hamm, and Claus Zundel.

"If Only I Could" was released on vinyl, audio cassette and compact disc in July 1989 by Virgin Records, as the lead single from Youngblood's debut album, Feeling Free (1989). It is one of his biggest hits, reaching number one in Belgium and the top three in many countries, including the United Kingdom, where it was the 13th-best-selling single of 1989.

== Background ==
In the song, Youngblood evokes "the world of brotherhood and love that he would like to create 'if only [he] could'". This utopian humanism is "very uncommon in the songs devoted to nightclubs". "If Only I Could" uses the bassline and drumbeat from the Raze house track "Break 4 Love".

== Chart performance ==
"If Only I Could" peaked at number-one in Belgium and entered the top 10 in Austria, France, Ireland, Sweden, Switzerland, the United Kingdom, and West Germany, as well as on the Eurochart Hot 100, where it peaked at number four. In the UK, the single reached number three on the UK Singles Chart on 1 October 1989. It spent two weeks at that position and was the 13th best-selling single of 1989. The song was also a top-20 hit in Denmark and Finland. Outside Europe, "If Only I Could" reached numbers 28 and 122 in New Zealand and Australia, respectively. In West Asia, it became a top-20 hit in Israel, peaking at number 20 on 15 October 1989. It earned a gold record in Austria and West Germany and a silver record in the UK.

== Critical reception ==
Upon the release, Larry Flick from Billboard magazine said that the "rich-voiced crooner temporarily moves away from usual R&B arena and pumps up the bass for this tasty, deep-baked houser that splashes with a nifty Motown-flavored undercurrent and funky wah-wah guitars. The right edit could set urban and pop radio ablaze." A reviewer from Liverpool Echo named it "one of the nicest dance/pop records of recent months, bringing songs back into dance music. And – Sydney knows a good song when he hears one."

Pan-European magazine Music & Media wrote, "Finally, Youngblood has found a song good enough to take his smooth, sweet voice to the higher reaches of the charts. The song combines a variety of styles – reggae meets hip-house with a dash of lover's rock. A sympathetic production by Claus Zundell and some supremely tasteful Spanish guitar breaks make this record a melodic delight. Starting to move rapidly up the UK chart and looking likely to repeat that success across Europe." David Giles from Music Week noted the song's "lush, sonorous vocal driven by a pulsating bass line", and concluded that "Youngblood looks set to become a big name on the strength of this single." Jacqui Carter from Number One stated, "'If Only I Could' will be one of the 'classic cuts' this year and continually played for many years to come." Orla Swift from Record-Journal described the song as "jazzy".

Phil Cheeseman of Record Mirror wrote that single was "nice", adding that "you'll need the 12 inch to really appreciate this". In the same magazine, the extended version reviewed by James Hamilton is called a "jauntily chugging 120 bpm bubbly bouncer helped in the current climate by tinkling flamenco-ish guitar and chimes (two instrumental mixes too)". Retrospectively, AllMusic editor Jose F. Promis viewed the song as "pure, early-'90s house".

== Music video ==
A music video was produced to promote the single. It features Youngblood bouncing around a ball that resembled the earth, while donning urban clothing and traditional African clothing.

== Track listings ==
- 7-inch single
1. "If Only I Could" – 3:30
2. "Spooky" – 3:54
- 12-inch single
1. "If Only I Could" (extended version) – 6:30
2. "If Only I Could" (Pacha Garden mix) – 6:35
3. "If Only I Could" (instrumental) – 5:10
- 3-inch CD single
1. "If Only I Could" (radio edit) – 3:30
2. "If Only I Could" (extended version) – 6:30
3. "Spooky" – 3:54
- Cassette single
1. "If Only I Could" – 3:30
2. "Spookey" (Instrumental) – 3:54
3. "If Only I Could" – 3:30
4. "Spookey" (Instrumental) – 3:54

== Charts ==
=== Weekly charts ===
Weekly chart performance for "If Only I Could"
Chart (1989)	Peak position
Australia (ARIA)	122
Austria (Ö3 Austria Top 40)	3
Belgium (Ultratop 50 Flanders)	1
Denmark (IFPI)	14
Europe (Eurochart Hot 100)	5
Finland (Suomen virallinen lista)	17
France (SNEP)	8
Ireland (IRMA)	2
Israel (Israeli Singles Chart)	20
Italy Airplay (Music & Media)	4
Luxembourg (Radio Luxembourg)	1
New Zealand (Recorded Music NZ)	28
Netherlands (Dutch Top 40)	2
Netherlands (Single Top 100)	2
Sweden (Sverigetopplistan)	9
Switzerland (Schweizer Hitparade)	3
UK Singles (Official Charts)	3
UK Dance (Music Week)	2
West Germany (GfK)	3

=== Year-end charts ===
Year-end chart performance for "If Only I Could"
Chart (1989)	Position
Belgium (Ultratop 50 Flanders)	11
Europe (Eurochart Hot 100)	29
Netherlands (Dutch Top 40)	8
Netherlands (Single Top 100)	20
UK Singles (OCC)	13
West Germany (Media Control)	35

== Certifications ==
Certifications for "If Only I Could"
Region	Certification	Certified units/sales
Austria (IFPI Austria)	Gold	25,000^{*}
Germany (BVMI)	Gold	250,000^{^}
United Kingdom (BPI)	Silver	200,000^{^}
^{*} Sales figures based on certification alone.^{^} Shipments figures based on certification alone.

== Wendy Matthews version ==
"If Only I Could"

Single by Wendy Matthews

from the album Lily
- Released: 5 April 1993
- Length: 3:55
- Label: rooART
- Songwriters: Claus Zundel; Mike Staab; Sydney Youngblood; Ralf Hamm
- Producer: T-Bone Burnett

Wendy Matthews singles chronology
"Friday's Child" (1993)	"If Only I Could" (1993)	"T.K.O." (1993)

Australian recording artist Wendy Matthews released a version of the song in April 1993 as the third single from her second studio album, Lily. The song peaked at number 41 on the Australian ARIA Singles Chart.

=== Track listing ===
1. "If Only I Could" (edit) – 3:55
2. "If Only I Could" (Timebomb mix) – 5:45
3. "Until You Say" – 4:48

=== Charts ===
Weekly chart performance for "If Only I Could"
Chart (1993)	Peak position
Australia (ARIA)	41

== Other cover versions ==
In March 2007, a version by Tom Pulse Vs. Sydney Youngblood was released and peaked at number 89 on the German Singles Chart.
