= Attende, Domine =

Gregorian chant for Lent

Attende, Domine is a Christian liturgical chant for the season of Lent, referred to in English as the Lent Prose matching Rorate caeli which is known as the Advent prose. The themes of this hymn are the sinfulness of man and the mercy of God, a theological concept emphasised during Lent.

== Composition ==
The melody of Attende Domine is a musical plainsong created in the early 19th century. It includes a short refrain – Atténde Dómine, et miserére, quia peccávimus tibi – repeated between longer verses. Because of its great popularity, it was included in the books of Solesmes in the 20th century, but at the cost of two modifications: it was deprived of its original rhythm of Gallican plainchant, and its primitive French verses, inspired by Scripture, were replaced by the text of an ancient versified litanic rhythm of the Hispanic liturgy. The current lyrics are adapted from the Preces of the sext office of Wednesday of the fifth week of Lent in the Mozarabic rite which can be traced back to the 10th century, on which the monks of Solesmes composed a new melody following a Mode V Gregorian melody.

In the 1950s, French Canon Gaston Roussel harmonized the Attende refrain in four parts, entrusting the liturgical chant to the bass and keeping the traditional rhythm of Parisian plainchant as the Mozarabic verses were not harmonized. In 1962, Domenico Bartolucci, permanent director of the Pontifical Sistine Chapel Choir, composed another arrangement still sung to this day at Saint Peter's Basilica.

== Text ==
=== Latin ===
℟. Attende, Domine, et miserere, quia peccavimus tibi.

1. Ad te Rex summe, omnium redemptor,
  oculos nostros sublevamus flentes:
  exaudi, Christe, supplicantum preces. ℟.
2. Dextera Patris, lapis angularis,
  via salutis, ianua caelestis,
  ablue nostri maculas delicti. ℟.
3. Rogamus, Deus, tuam maiestatem:
  auribus sacris gemitus exaudi:
  crimina nostra placidus indulge. ℟.
4. Tibi fatemur crimina admissa:
  contrito corde pandimus occulta:
  tua Redemptor, pietas ignoscat. ℟.
5. Innocens captus, nec repugnans ductus,
  testibus falsis pro impiis damnatus:
  quos redemisti, tu conserva, Christe. ℟.

=== English ===
℟. Hear us, O mighty Lord, show us your Mercy: Sinners we stand before you.

1. To thee, Redeemer, on thy throne of glory:
  lift we our weeping eyes in holy pleadings:
  listen, O Jesu, to our supplications. ℟.
2. O thou chief cornerstone, right hand of the Father:
  way of salvation, gate of life celestial:
  cleanse thou our sinful souls from all defilement. ℟.
3. God, we implore thee, in thy glory seated:
  bow down and hearken to thy weeping children:
  pity and pardon all our grievous trespasses. ℟.
4. Sins oft committed now we lay before thee:
  with true contrition, now no more we veil them:
  grant us, Redeemer, loving absolution. ℟.
5. Innocent, captive, taken unresisting:
  falsely accused and for us sinners sentenced,
  save us, we pray thee, Jesu our Redeemer. ℟.

Adaptation by W.J. Birkbeck in The English Hymnal
