= Ain't No Sunshine =

1971 single by Bill Withers

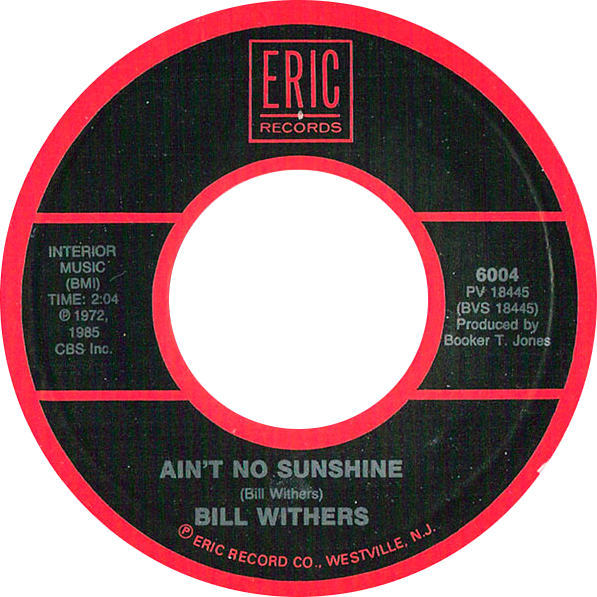
- Side B of the 1985 US reissue

Single by Bill Withers

from the album Just As I Am
- B-side: "Harlem"
- Released: July 1971
- Genre: R&B; soul; blues; folk rock
- Length: 2:04
- Label: Sussex
- Songwriter: Bill Withers
- Producer: Booker T. Jones

Bill Withers singles chronology
| "Harlem" (1971) | "Ain't No Sunshine" (1971) | "Grandma's Hands" (1971) |

Audio video
- "Ain't No Sunshine" on YouTube

"Ain't No Sunshine" is a song by American singer and songwriter Bill Withers, from his 1971 debut album Just As I Am. It was produced by Booker T. Jones, with Donald "Duck" Dunn on bass guitar, Al Jackson Jr. on drums and Stephen Stills on guitar. The song's strings were arranged by Jones. It was recorded in Los Angeles, with overdubs in Memphis by the track's engineer Terry Manning.

Released as a single in 1971, the song became the breakthrough hit for Withers and one of his best known tracks, reaching number six on the U.S. R&B Chart and number three on the Billboard Hot 100 chart. Billboard ranked it as the 23rd biggest hit single of 1971. It reached the Top 40 again in 2009 in the United Kingdom after a version was performed by Kris Allen on the eighth season of American Idol.

In 2024, the single was added to the National Recording Registry by the Library of Congress for it being "culturally, historically, and/or aesthetically significant".

== History ==
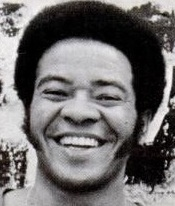
Withers in 1971

Withers was inspired to write the song after watching the 1962 movie Days of Wine and Roses. He explained, in reference to the characters played by Lee Remick and Jack Lemmon, "They were both alcoholics who were alternately weak and strong. It's like going back for seconds on rat poison. Sometimes you miss things that weren't particularly good for you. It's just something that crossed my mind from watching that movie, and probably something else that happened in my life that I'm not aware of."

For the song's bridge, Withers had intended to write more lyrics instead of repeating the phrase "I know" 26 times, but then followed the advice of the other musicians to leave it that way. Withers stated: "I was this factory worker puttering around. So when they said to leave it like that, I left it."

Withers, then 31, was working at a factory making lavatories for Boeing 747s at the time he wrote the song. When the song went gold, the record company presented Withers with a golden toilet seat, marking the start of his new career. "Ain't No Sunshine" was the first of Withers' three gold records in the U.S.

Originally released as the B-side to a song called "Harlem", "Ain't No Sunshine" was preferred by disc jockeys, and it became a huge hit, Withers' first. "Harlem" was later covered by The 5th Dimension, who featured it on their Soul and Inspiration album and released it as a single.

Withers performed "Ain't No Sunshine" on The Old Grey Whistle Test. It won the Grammy for Best R&B Song in 1972 and is ranked 285th on Rolling Stone's list of the 500 Greatest Songs of All Time. During the solar eclipse of August 12, 2026, Spotify noted a 3% increase in streaming of the song worldwide.

== Charts ==
=== Weekly charts ===
Weekly chart performance for "Ain't No Sunshine"
| Chart (1971) | Peak position |
|---|---|
| Australia (Kent Music Report) | 17 |
| Canada Top Singles RPM | 9 |
| US Billboard Hot 100 | 3 |
| US Adult Contemporary (Billboard) | 2 |
| US Best Selling Soul Singles (Billboard) | 6 |
| US Cash Box Top 100 | 4 |

2009 weekly chart performance for "Ain't No Sunshine"
| Chart (2009) | Peak position |
|---|---|
| UK Singles (OCC) | 40 |

2020 weekly chart performance for "Ain't No Sunshine"
| Chart (2020) | Peak position |
|---|---|
| Germany (GfK) | 76 |
| Ireland (IRMA) | 91 |
| Scottish Singles Sales (Official Charts) | 7 |
| Switzerland (Schweizer Hitparade) | 24 |

2024 weekly chart performance for "Ain't No Sunshine"
| Chart (2024) | Peak position |
|---|---|
| Global 200 (Billboard) | 136 |
| Greece International (IFPI) | 39 |
| Israel (Mako Hitlist) | 79 |
| Sweden Heatseeker (Sverigetopplistan) | 1 |

=== Year-end charts ===
Year-end chart performance for "Ain't No Sunshine"
| Chart (1971) | Position |
|---|---|
| US Billboard Hot 100 | 23 |
| US Cash Box Top 100 | 24 |
| US Best Selling Soul Singles (Billboard) | 21 |

== Certifications ==
Certifications for "Ain't No Sunshine"
| Region | Certification | Certified units/sales |
|---|---|---|
| Australia (ARIA) | Platinum | 70,000^{‡} |
| Denmark (IFPI Danmark) | 2× Platinum | 180,000^{‡} |
| Germany (BVMI) | Gold | 250,000^{‡} |
| Italy (FIMI) | Platinum | 50,000^{‡} |
| New Zealand (RMNZ) | 5× Platinum | 150,000^{‡} |
| Portugal (AFP) | 2× Platinum | 20,000^{‡} |
| Spain (Promusicae) | 2× Platinum | 120,000^{‡} |
| United Kingdom (BPI) | 2× Platinum | 1,200,000^{‡} |
| United States (RIAA) | 4× Platinum | 4,000,000^{‡} |
Streaming
| Greece (IFPI Greece) | Platinum | 2,000,000^{†} |
^{‡} Sales+streaming figures based on certification alone.^{†} Streaming-only figures based on certification alone.

== Michael Jackson version ==
"Ain't No Sunshine"
- Yellow sleeve variant of the Dutch single

Single by Michael Jackson

from the album Got to Be There
- B-side: "Ben"
- Released: July 3, 1972
- Recorded: November 1971
- Studio: Hitsville West (Los Angeles, California)
- Genre: Soul; psychedelic soul; teen pop
- Length: 4:09
- Label: Motown
- Songwriter: Bill Withers
- Producer: Hal Davis

Michael Jackson singles chronology
| "I Wanna Be Where You Are" (1972) | "Ain't No Sunshine" (1972) | "Ben" (1972) |

In 1971, singer Michael Jackson recorded a rendition of Bill Withers' song for his debut album Got to Be There (released in early 1972).

In the UK, the song was released as the third (and final) single from the album (after the two singles "Got to Be There" and "Rockin' Robin", a cover of Bobby Day's 1958 song). The song "I Wanna Be Where You Are", which was released as the third single in the US, was on the B-side. It was a hit, peaking in the UK Singles Chart at number 8 for 3 weeks in September 1972. The song was remixed by Benny Blanco for the 2009 release The Remix Suite. The song's drum break was sampled in "Gonna Love Me" by Teyana Taylor from her second studio album K.T.S.E..

=== Charts ===
1972 weekly chart performance for "Ain't No Sunshine" by Michael Jackson
| Chart (1972) | Peak position |
|---|---|
| UK Singles (OCC) | 8 |

2009 weekly chart performance for "Ain't No Sunshine" by Michael Jackson
| Chart (2009) | Peak position |
|---|---|
| UK Singles (Official Charts) | 92 |

== Other charted versions ==
In 1988, American-German singer Sydney Youngblood released his own version of "Ain't No Sunshine", which peaked at number 78 on the UK Singles Chart in July that year, with four weeks of charting. The song was later included on his debut album Feeling Free (1989) and was released as a single in France only in August 1990, peaking at number 35 and charting for six weeks in the SNEP top 50.

In November 1991, Australian pop band Rockmelons (featuring vocalist Deni Hines) released a version as the lead single of their second studio album, Form 1 Planet (1992). The version peaked at number five and was certified Gold in Australia. It also peaked at number eight in New Zealand.

The Nylons version was released in 1998 and reached number 53 on the Canadian Adult Contemporary chart. A South African male choral group Ladysmith Black Mambazo recorded its own version featuring vocalist Des'ree for their studio album In Harmony (1999). As a single, the version peaked at number 42 in the UK.

The heavy metal band Black Label Society covered the song entitled "Ain't No Sunshine When She's Gone" for their 2013 album Unblackened. As a single, the version peaked at number 42 on the Canadian Rock Chart.
