= Exile (Geoffrey Oryema album) =

Studio album by Geoffrey Oryema
- Released: 1990
- Recorded: 1990
- Genre: World Music
- Length: 37:23
- Label: Real World
- Producer: Brian Eno

Geoffrey Oryema chronology
Exile (1990)	Beat the Border (1993)

Exile is the debut album by the Ugandan musician Geoffrey Oryema. It was released in 1990. The album has sold more than 50,000 copies.

Oryema escaped his country after his father was assassinated during the rule of Idi Amin, as chronicled in "Solitude". Many of the songs contain nostalgia about the land and the people Oryema had to leave.

== Production ==
The album was produced by Brian Eno, with Eno and Peter Gabriel providing backing vocals on some songs. It was engineered by David Bottrill. Oryema played the lukeme, among other instruments. He sang in Acoli, English, and Swahili. The title track calls for an end to tribal fighting in Africa.

== Critical reception ==
Professional ratings
Review scores
Source	Rating
AllMusic	3/5 stars
Los Angeles Daily News	4/4 stars
Select	3/5 medals

The Los Angeles Daily News stated that "Oryema is a folk artist who sings in a syncopated style to the minimal backing of percussion, acoustic guitars and a seven-string harp called a nanga." The Syracuse Herald-Journal wrote that "the music is lively, the vocals intense."

== Track listing ==
All tracks written and composed by Geoffrey Oryema, unless noted.

1. "Piny Runa Woko"
2. "Land of Anaka" (Geoffrey Oryema and Brian Eno)
3. "Piri Wango Iya"
4. "Ye Ye Ye"
5. "Lacan Woto Kumu"
6. "Makambo" (music from "Likambo Ya Ngana" by Franco Luambo, uncredited)
7. "Jok Omako Nyako"
8. "Solitude"
9. "Lubanga"
10. "Exile"
