= Friday's Child (Wendy Matthews song) =

1993 single by Wendy Matthews

Single by Wendy Matthews

from the album Lily
- B-side: "So Tell Me How"; "Goin' Back to My Roots"; "La jour ou tu est partis (The Day You Went Away)"
- Released: January 1993
- Label: rooART
- Songwriters: David Munday; Sandy Stewart
- Producer: T-Bone Burnett

Wendy Matthews singles chronology
"The Day You Went Away" (1992)	"Friday's Child" (1993)	"If Only I Could" (1993)

"Friday's Child" is a song by Australian recording artist Wendy Matthews. It was released in January 1993 as the second single form Matthew's second studio album, Lily (1992). The song peaked at number 15 on the Australian ARIA Singles Chart. At the ARIA Music Awards of 1994, it won Best Female Artist.

== Track listing ==
Australian CD and cassette single

1. "Friday's Child"
2. "So Tell Me How"
3. "Goin' Back to My Roots"
4. "La jour ou tu est partis (The Day You Went Away)"

== Charts ==
Chart (1993)	Peak position
Australia (ARIA)	15
