= Geoffrey Oryema =

Ugandan musician (1953–2018)

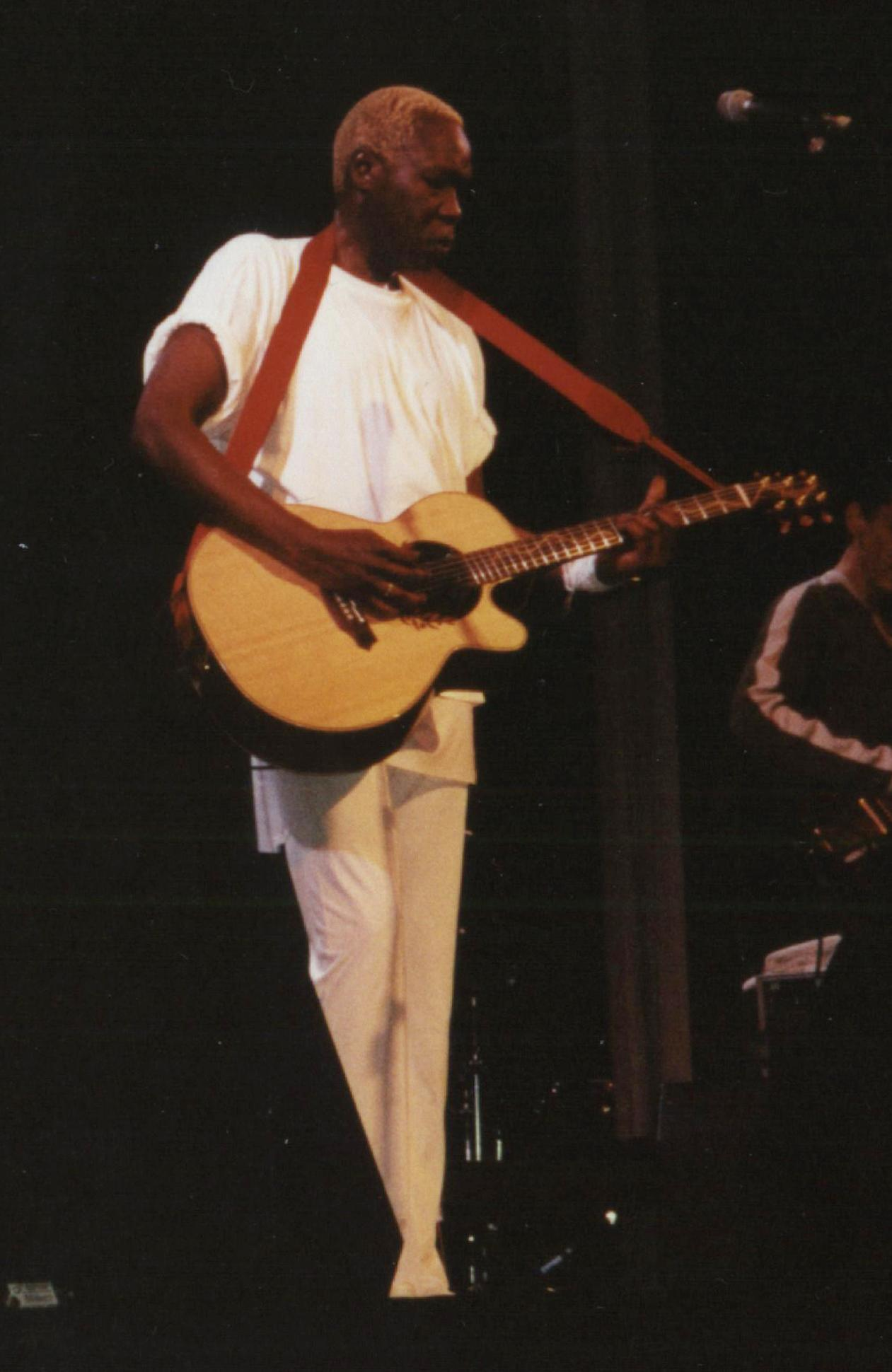
- Geoffrey Oryema during a concert in Mainz, Germany, 13 March 2001

Background information
- Born: Geoffrey Oryema; 16 April 1953; Soroti, Uganda
- Died: 22 June 2018 (aged 65) Lorient, France
- Genres: World music; Afro-pop-rock
- Occupation: Musician
- Years active: 1990–2018

Geoffrey Oryema (16 April 1953 – 22 June 2018) was a Ugandan musician from Nwoya District. In 1977 after the murder of his father, Erinayo Wilson Oryema, who was a cabinet minister in the government of Idi Amin, he began his life in exile. At the age of 24, and at the height of Amin's power, Oryema was smuggled out of the country in the trunk of a car.

== Background and education ==
Oryema's parents were Lt. Col. Erinayo Wilson Oryema who was the first Inspector general of police in Uganda from 1964 to 1971 and Janet Manjeri Acoyo.

== Career ==
He sang in the languages of his youth, Swahili and Acholi, the languages of his lost country, the "clear green land" of Uganda, and he also sang in English and French.

Oryema earned his international reputation on the release of his second album, Beat the Border. He had collaborated with Peter Gabriel, Brian Eno and others, and was backed by French musicians including Jean-Pierre Alarcen (guitar) and Patrick Buchmann (drums, percussion, backing vocals), touring with WOMAD in Australia, the USA, Japan, Brazil and Europe. In 1994 the band performed at Woodstock 94 celebrating the 25th anniversary of the legendary festival.

Gabriel's record label, Real World, helped with the first three of Oryema's albums, before his move to Sony International, a label established in France, where Oryema had lived since his exile.

In July 2005, he performed at the LIVE 8: Africa Calling concert in Cornwall, and with 1 Giant Leap at the Live 8 Edinburgh concert.

He resided in Paris, France, until his death from cancer. His ashes were delivered to Anaka.

== Personal life ==
Oryema was married to Regine. They had three children, Ajoline, Chantal and Oceng.

== Discography ==
- Exile (1990)
- Beat the Border (1993)
- Night to Night (1996)
- Spirit (2000)
- The Odysseus/Best Of (2002)
- Words (with Melanie Gabriel) (2004)
- From The Heart (Released on Long Tale Recordings) (2010)

== See also ==
- Idi Amin
- Abu Mayanja
- Miria Obote
