= ¡Spiritual, Spiritual! =

Studio album by B-Tribe
- Released: 2001

B-Tribe chronology
Sensual Sensual (1998)	¡Spiritual, Spiritual! (2001)	5 (2003)

¡Spiritual, Spiritual! is the fourth album by B-Tribe, released in 2001. According to the sleeve notes, "We believe there is a peace that lives within us all. It is a place of vision and clarity, where the rhythm of life moves in harmony with a higher consciousness".

== Track listing ==
No.	Title	Length
1.	"Intro"	2:48
2.	"Adagio in G Minor"	4:11
3.	"La Guitarra"	4:28
4.	"Sketches of St. Antoni"	4:52
5.	"Las Salinas"	5:44
6.	"Spiritual Spiritual"	6:55
7.	"Es Vedra"	4:55
8.	"Matador De Sa Pena"	5:33
9.	"Reprise: Spiritual"	1:55
10.	"Sunset in St. Carlos"	5:49
11.	"She Moves Through the Fair"	5:00
12.	"The Sun"	3:05
