= Sydney Youngblood =

American-German singer

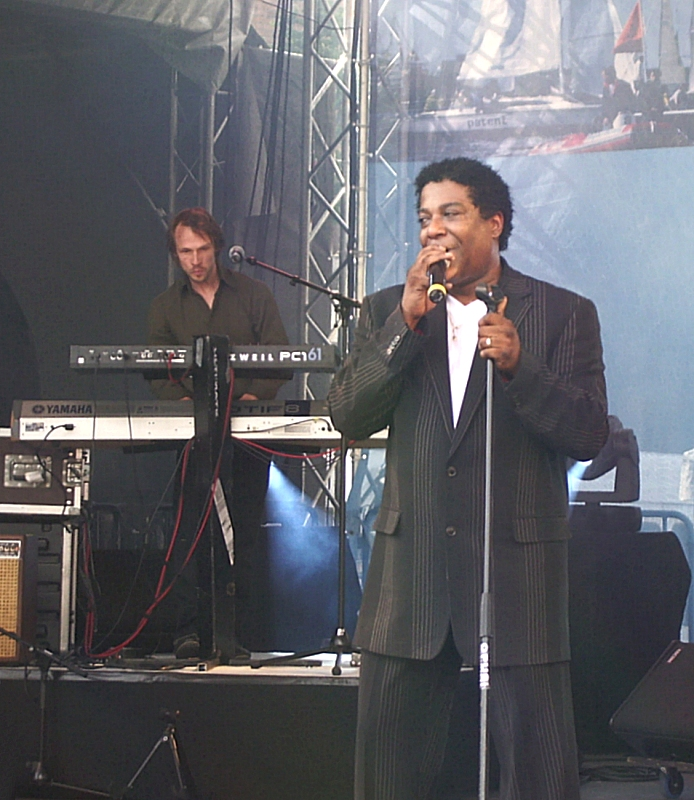
- Youngblood in 2008

Background information
- Born: Sydney Ford; December 2, 1960 (age 65); San Antonio, Texas, U.S.
- Genres: Dance; house
- Occupation: Singer
- Years active: 1988–present
- Labels: Circa Records; Virgin; Arista; RCA

Sydney Ford (born December 2, 1960), better known as Sydney Youngblood, is an American-German singer, actor and composer, who had several successful dance hits during the late 1980s and early 1990s.

== Early life ==
Ford was born in Texas. From an early age he loved singing. He won a competition aged six in his hometown where his grandmother called him "youngblood" for his "vibrancy" to perform. He played in a number of bands but at age twenty, he enlisted into the US army and served in Germany for five years. Ford returned home and returned to music, only this time seeking fame and fortune as a solo artist. Signed to Virgin Records, his first release was a cover of Bill Withers' "Ain't No Sunshine", which made a short appearance in the lower section of the UK Singles Chart in 1988.

== Career ==
Youngblood had two top 40 hits in the UK and Europe in 1988 and 1989, "Sit and Wait" and his debut "If Only I Could", which reached number three on the UK Singles Chart. The song uses the bassline and drumbeat from the Raze track "Break 4 Love".

In the US, the song "I'd Rather Go Blind" (originally sung by Etta James) enjoyed heavy rotation on the dance scene and made the top 10 on the Billboard Dance chart. "Sit and Wait" reached number 16 in the UK in December 1989.

Youngblood continued his success with the album Feeling Free, which also contained his earlier single, "Ain't No Sunshine".

In 2018, Youngblood participated in the 12th season of the German reality show I'm a Star – Get Me Out of Here! on RTL Television.

== Discography ==
=== Studio albums ===
List of albums, with selected details and chart positions
Title	Album details	Peak chart positions								
Title	Album details	US	AUS	AUT	GER	NED	NZ	SWE	SWI	UK
Feeling Free Sydney Youngblood	Released: 1989; Label: Circa; Format: LP, cassette, CD; Titled Sydney Youngblood for North America	185	59	7	9	56	19	5	9	23
Passion, Grace and Serious Bass...	Released: 1991; Label: Circa; Format: LP, cassette, CD	—	130	40	60	—	—	—	39	—
Just the Way It Is	Released: 1993; Label: RCA; Format: Cassette, CD	—	—	—	—	—	—	—	—	—
The Hat Won't Fit	Released: 1994; Label: RCA; Format: Cassette, CD	—	—	—	—	—	—	—	—	—
Black Magic	Released: February 2014; Label: 7soul; Format: CD, digital	—	—	—	—	—	—	—	—	—

=== Compilation albums ===
List of albums, with selected details
Title	Details
Hooked On You The Best Of	Released: 1994; Format: CD; Label: Virgin

=== Singles ===
Year	Single	Peak positions												Album
Year	Single	UK	AUS	AUT	BEL (FL)	FRA	GER	IRE	NED	NZ	SWE	SWI	US	Album
1988	"Ain't No Sunshine"	78	—	—	—	—	—	—	—	—	—	—	—	Feeling Free
1988	"Congratulations"	—	—	—	—	—	—	—	—	—	—	—	—	Feeling Free
1989	"If Only I Could"	3	122	3	1	8	3	2	2	28	9	3	—	Feeling Free
1989	"Sit and Wait"	16	59	2	2	21	2	15	7	—	2	6	—	Feeling Free
1990	"I'd Rather Go Blind"	44	71	—	34	—	23	—	—	—	—	—	46	Feeling Free
1990	"Ain't No Sunshine" (France only)	—	—	—	—	35	—	—	—	—	—	—	—	Feeling Free
1991	"Hooked on You"	72	120	—	—	35	36	—	—	—	34	27	—	Passion, Grace and Serious Bass...
1991	"Wherever You Go"	—	—	—	—	—	—	—	—	—	—	—	—	Passion, Grace and Serious Bass...
1993	"Anything"	48	163	—	27	—	51	—	—	—	—	—	—	Just the Way It Is
1993	"No Big Deal"	90	—	—	—	—	—	—	—	—	—	—	—	Just the Way It Is
1994	"So Good So Right (All I Can Do)"	—	—	—	—	—	91	—	—	—	—	—	—	The Hat Won't Fit
1999	"Christmas Song"	—	—	—	—	—	—	—	—	—	—	—	—	Singles only
2007	"If Only I Could" (Tom Pulse vs. Sydney Youngblood)	—	—	—	—	—	89	—	—	—	—	—	—	Singles only
2013	"Sit and Wait 2013" (with Jesse Ritch)	—	—	—	—	—	—	—	—	—	—	—	—	Singles only
"—" denotes releases that did not chart or were not released.

== See also ==
- List of house music artists and releases
