= Sacred Spirit =

German musical project

- Genres: Electronic; new age; world; ambient
- Years active: 1993–present
- Label: Higher Octave Music
- Members: Claus Zundel; Ralf Hamm; Markus Staab
- Website: www.sacredspirit.de

Sacred Spirit is a German musical project by Claus Zundel, Ralf Hamm, and Markus Staab. The music is of electronic, new age, world, and ambient genres. Sacred Spirit's total worldwide album sales are estimated at over 3 million copies. For each album sold, donations are made to the Native American Rights Fund, a non-profit Native American organization devoted to restoring the legal rights of Native Americans.

== History ==
The first album, Chants and Dances of the Native Americans was released in 1994. The album was nominated for best New Age album Grammy Award. In keeping with the Native American theme, Zundel adopted the pseudonym "The Fearsome Brave", and on his many other projects he is simply credited as "The Brave". The music conveys the stories, legends and plight of the Native Americans by combining sampled chants of the Navajo, Pueblo and Sioux tribes and Sami people yoik with synthesizer backings, all driven forth by a combination of traditional drumming and electronic dance-beats. The first single released off the album was "Yeha-Noha" (Wishes of happiness and prosperity), which was largely responsible for catapulting Sacred Spirit into the limelight. The single reached #1 position in number of countries, including 6 weeks at #1 in France. In the US, "Yeha Noha" sung by Navajo elder Kee Chee Jake of Chinle, Arizona reached top 20 on the Dance Club Songs chart. The album is arguably one of the most successful enigmatic projects ever, garnering sales of more than seven million albums worldwide. It reached top 10 and charted for twenty seven weeks in the UK Albums Chart.

In August 1995 "Tor-Cheney-Nahana (Winter Ceremony)" gained airplay in Madrid, Spain, according to playlists supplied to Music & Media Magazine for two of the top radio stations of the era.

A second album was released by Sacred Spirit, but it was a complete divergence from the original. The focus this time was around the blues singing of America. In keeping with the change of theme, the American release saw the group name also being changed, to Indigo Spirit.

Virgin Records released the third Sacred Spirit album in 2000. The album was nominated for best New Age Grammy Award in 2001. This time the project's name was slightly altered to Indians' Sacred Spirit (and in some areas even that was abbreviated to Indians' Spirit), probably to inform listeners that it was different from the second album. The subtitle is More Chants and Dances of the Native Americans. The album continues the mood and production of the first, however the album was more instrumental. Although all the tracks did feature chants or speech, each song was composed of many short samples pieced together, unlike the first album which tended to use one extended sample per song.

In 2003, two Sacred Spirit albums were released on Higher Octave music label. The first one, Jazzy Chill Out, featured the vocal samples from Lightnin' Hopkins, John Lee Hooker, Anita O'Day and Ella Fitzgerald.

On the other 2003 album, Bluesy Chill Out, Zundel collaborated with fellow Ibiza resident Dave “BK” Jeffs, a Northern Ireland native and former street musician, who plays regularly at a local club named Teatro Perera. Each track was created organically, with Jeffs (who also sings and plays flute and harmonica) composing improvisational slide and steel guitar riffs as a foundation for The Brave to build upon.

== Controversy ==
On the first album, the song "Ly-O-Lay Ale Loya (The Counterclockwise Circle Dance)" was presented as a native American chant, however the main vocals are an authentic Sami yoik ("Normo Jovnna" by Terje Tretnes), recorded in 1994 by Dutch Channel 4 during an interview as an example of a yoik. The recording, despite Channel 4's denial of having sold it, then ended up in a Virgin Records studio in the Netherlands. The Sami organisation Sámi kopiija demanded royalties from Virgin Records but this has so far been unsuccessful.

== Discography ==
=== Studio albums ===
List of studio albums, with selected details, chart positions and certifications
Title	Album details	Peak chart positions										Certifications
Title	Album details	GER	AUS	BEL (FL)	BEL (WA)	FRA	NED	NOR	SWE	SWI	UK	Certifications
Chants and Dances of the Native Americans	Released: 1994; Label: Virgin; Format: CD, cassette	9	25	6	1	—	26	28	9	8	9	BVMI: Gold; BEA: Platinum; BPI: Platinum; GLF: Gold; IFPI: Platinum; PROMUSICAE: Platinum; SNEP: 2× Platinum
Sacred Spirit Volume 2: Culture Clash	Released: 1997; Label: Virgin; Format: CD, cassette	59	66	—	42	—	59	—	53	—	24	BPI: Silver
Music for Fading Cultures (Pieces of Time)	Released: 1998 (Japan only); Label: Virgin; Format: CD	—	—	—	—	—	—	—	—	—	—	
Indians' Sacred Spirit: More Chants and Dances of the Native Americans	Released: 2000; Label: Virgin; Format: CD, cassette	95	—	—	—	37	88	—	—	—	—	
Volume 8: Jazzy Chill Out (featuring Eric-Jan Harmsen)	Released: 2003; Format: CD; Label: Higher Octave Music	—	—	—	—	—	—	—	—	—	—	
Volume 9: Bluesy Chill Out (featuring Dave "BK" Jeffs)	Released: 2003; Format: CD; Label: Higher Octave Music	—	—	—	—	—	—	—	—	—	—	

=== Remix albums ===
List of remix albums, with selected details
Title	Details
Sacred Spirit (Dance Remixes)	Released: 1995; Format: CD, 2×LP; Label: Virgin

=== Extended plays ===
List of EPs, with selected details
Title	Details
The Club Tepee	Released: 1994; Format: LP; Label: Virgin

=== Singles ===
List of singles, with selected chart positions
Title	Year	Peak chart positions					Album
Title	Year	GER	AUS	BEL (WA)	FRA	UK	Album
"Yeha-Noha (Wishes of Happiness and Prosperity)"	1994	—	76	3	1	37	The Club Tepee
"Ly-O-Lay-Ale Loya"	1995	—	—	—	—	—	Chants and Dances of the Native Americans
"Tor-Cheney-Nahana (Winter Ceremony)"	1995	—	—	—	—	45	Chants and Dances of the Native Americans
"Legends"	1997	100	—	—	—	—	Sacred Spirit Volume 2: Culture Clash
"Roots"	1997	—	—	—	—	—	Sacred Spirit Volume 2: Culture Clash
