= Claus Zundel =

German composer, songwriter, producer and pianist

Claus Zundel, also known as The Brave, is a German composer, songwriter, producer and pianist who has created several projects inspired by global cultures over the course of his career. The most notable are Sacred Spirit and B-Tribe, which sold 20 million copies combined, but he has a litany of Indie projects as well. These include Moroccan Spirit, Classical Spirit, Divine Works, Ancient Spirit, and Tango Jointz.

After beginning his career in the 1980s as a writer and producer for several German musicians, such as Hubert Kah, Zundel produced 2 pop albums for American-German singer/actor Sydney Youngblood. The first album, Feeling Free, included several hit singles that reached gold status in countries throughout Europe. The most successful one of these was "If Only I Could", which reached the top 3 in the UK charts upon release. While Zundel was signed to Circa Records UK, a short-lived label run by to-be Virgin USA executives Ashley Newton and Ray Cooper, the Youngblood records were distributed under Virgin Records U.K. The success of Feeling Free opened the door for Zundel into the international music world.

Zundel's musical style is often referred to as "The Brave Sound", coined for its unique stylistic and mixing choices. He makes a point to collaborate with musicians and singers from around the world using this label; creating "The Brave Sound" projects with them.

== Biography ==
Born in Heidelberg, Germany, Zundel got his professional start in 1980s R&B music, producing three tracks for Chaka Khan and several popular European artists over the course of the decade. Eventually tiring of his fast-paced lifestyle in Germany, Zundel moved to Ibiza, Spain in late '80s.

Musicians Ralf Hamm and Markus Staab joined Zundel as co-producers in 1988. In 1990, the three of them recorded under the name B.S.O.G., featuring vocals by Elaine Hudson. They released a single by the name of "Bow Wow Wow," with additional tracks "Wam Bam" and "Cooler Moments Of Vivaldi".

While living in Ibiza, Zundel found a passion for flamenco. In 1993 this coalesced with the creation of his first successful musical project: B-Tribe ("Barcelona Tribe of Soulsters"). With its first album, 1993s ¡Fiesta Fatal!, B-Tribe hit charts all over the world. Five more albums followed soon after, with total sales reaching over 5 million copies.

In 1995 Zundel created Sacred Spirit, his second multi-million selling project. Inspired by the history, cultures, and hardships of several North American Indigenous tribes, Sacred Spirit borrowed from Indigenous music much in the same way B-Tribe borrowed from flamenco. For example, the album Chants and Dances of Native Americans mixes ceremonial chants from members of the Sioux, Navajo, and Pueblo tribes with drum patterns and electronic sounds. It had mostly positive reception upon release, receiving multi-platinum awards from RIAA and selling 7 million copies worldwide. In 2001, a second album followed, named More Chants and Dances of Native Americans. With it, Zundel was nominated for Best New Age, Ambient, Or Chant Album at the 44th Grammy Awards. He lost to A Day Without Rain by Irish singer and songwriter Enya.

Other related projects over the next few years include Divine Works (1996) (responsible for the 1997 dance single "Ancient Person of My Heart"), Ancient Spirit (1997), and One Little Creature. Many songs from these projects are difficult to obtain. However, some tracks from Divine Works are on the Sacred Spirit's 2003 album Classical Spirit (2003). Classical Spirit is a collection of five famous classical pieces remixed by Claus, as well as five of his own compositions.

In 2002, Zundel found success once more with Moroccan Spirit, which was a "The Brave" mix of Moroccan native songs recorded by Zundel during a five-month trip to Morocco. He also produced the Rose Moore album Spirit Of Silence in 2002. In February 2007, a new Zundel produced album was released worldwide — Palermo Nuevo — under project name Tango Jointz. Named after the cosmopolitan cultural and musical hotspot in Buenos Aires, this album is a collection of musical offerings combining traditional tango sounds and Latin rhythms with electronic beats.

== Discography ==
Albums produced/written

- Sydney Youngblood - Just the Way it Is (1993)
- B-Tribe - Fiesta Fatal (Warner/Atlantic) (1994)
- Sacred Spirit - Chants And Dances Of The Native Americans (Virgin) (1995)
- B-Tribe - Suave Suave (Atlantic) (1995)
- Ancient Spirit (1997)
- Sacred Spirit - Culture Clash (Virgin) (1997), re-released as Indigo Spirit in 2000 on Higher Octave Music
- Divine Works - Soundtrack for the New Millennium (Virgin) (1997)
- Divine Works - Ancient Person Of My Heart (Virgin) (1997) (CD, Maxi-Single and as 12" vinyl)
- B-Tribe - Sensual Sensual (Atlantic) (1998)
- One Little Creature - Music of Fading Cultures - Pieces of Time (Virgin/Phantom) (1998)
- Hubert Kah - Rosemarie (1999)
- Sacred Spirit - More Chants And Dances Of The Native Americans (Higher Octave/Virgin) (2000)
- Ancient Spirits for a New Age - 5-CD Box Set
- B-Tribe - Spiritual Spiritual (Higher Octave) (2001)
- Moroccan Spirit - Moroccan Spirit (Higher Octave) (2002)
- Rose Moore - Spirit of Silence (2002)
- Classical Spirit - Classical Spirit (Higher Octave) (2003)
- B-Tribe - 5 (Higher Octave) (2003)
- Sacred Spirit - Jazzy Chill Out (Higher Octave) (2003)
- Sacred Spirit - Bluesy Chill Out (Higher Octave) (2003)
- Tango Jointz - Palermo Nuevo (La Escondida) (2007)
- Macao Cafe -presents b-tribe 6 (macaocafemusic) (2007)
- Holophone presents B-TRIBE 6 (Holophone) (2008)

Singles produced/written

- Raw Pulse - No Brothershit (Based On Take Five) (1994)
- B-Tribe - Fatal Fatal
- B-Tribe - Nanita
- B-Tribe - Que Mala Vida
