= Out of Mind, Out of Sight (song) =

Single by Models

from the album Out of Mind, Out of Sight
- B-side: "Seeing Is Believing"
- Released: June 1985
- Recorded: 1984–1985
- Genre: Rock
- Length: 3:38
- Label: Mushroom, Geffen
- Songwriter: James Freud
- Producers: Nick Launay, Mark Opitz

Models singles chronology
"Barbados" (1985)	"Out of Mind, Out of Sight" (1985)	"Cold Fever" (1985)

"Out of Mind, Out of Sight" is a by Australian new wave rock band Models from their fourth studio album, Out of Mind, Out of Sight. It was released in June 1985 and was their most successful single, which peaked at No. 1 on the Australian Kent Music Report singles chart. At the 1985 Countdown Music Awards, the song won Best Single. In January 2018, as part of Triple M's "Ozzest 100", the "most Australian" songs of all time, "Out Of Mind, Out Of Sight" was ranked number 92.

== Background ==
Models formed in Melbourne in 1978 by members from Teenage Radio Stars and JAM, after some line-up changes they were Andrew Duffield on keyboards, Mark Ferrie on bass guitar, Janis Friedenfelds (a.k.a. Johnny Crash) on drums and percussion, and Sean Kelly on vocals and lead guitar. By 1982, more line-up changes occurred, Ferrie and Friedenfelds had left and James Freud (ex-Teenage Radio Stars, James Freud & Berlin) joined on bass guitar and vocals. Kelly and Freud had been in high school bands which developed into Teenage Radio Stars. New Zealand drummer, Barton Price (ex-Crocodiles, Sardine v) joined later in 1982.

The Duffield, Freud, Kelly and Price version of the group released the highly regarded 1983 LP The Pleasure of Your Company, produced by Nick Launay. The video for the single "God Bless America", released in March 1984, featured backing singers Kate Ceberano and Zan Abeyratne (both members of I'm Talking). Models' next single, "Big on Love" was produced by Reggie Lucas. By late 1984, Models relocated to Sydney and Duffield – with his crucial influence on the band's sound – was forced out under acrimonious circumstances to be replaced by Roger Mason (ex- James Freud's Berlin) on keyboards and James Valentine on saxophone. For touring during late 1984 to 1985, the group was regularly augmented by backing singers Ceberano and Zan Abeyratne; and from 1985, by Canadian-born singer Wendy Matthews. Matthews and Kelly became a couple, remaining together for 11 years.

In early 1985, Models recorded more material for their next album, Out Of Mind Out Of Sight, produced by Mark Opitz, Reggie Lucas and Nick Launay. On 13 July, Models performed four songs for the Oz for Africa concert (part of the global Live Aid program) – "Big on Love", "I Hear Motion", "Stormy Tonight", and "Out Of Mind Out Of Sight". It was broadcast in Australia (on both Seven Network and Nine Network) and on MTV in the US. Models then went on a national tour with I'm Talking in July. The band released their most commercially successful album, Out Of Mind Out Of Sight in August on Mushroom Records, which peaked at No. 3 on the Kent Music Report album charts. For the tour Models were Freud, Kelly, Mason, Matthews, Price and Valentine with Ceberano, Zan Abeyratne, and her twin sister, Sherine Abeyratne (Big Pig) on backing vocals. The album provided five singles, the first, "Big on Love", was released well in advance of its album, in November 1984, and peaked at No. 24 on the Kent Music Report singles chart. The second single, "Barbados", was released in March 1985 and peaked at No. 2.

The third single, "Out Of Mind Out Of Sight", was released in June and reached No. 1, becoming their best-performing single. It was written by Freud, who was now writing or co-writing most of the Models' songs, and was the only No. 1 single on the Australian End of Year singles chart for 1985 by an Australian artist. In 1986, Geffen Records released "Out Of Mind Out Of Sight" internationally, and it appeared on the US Billboard Hot 100 singles chart, peaking at No. 37. The band toured the US in November, supporting Orchestral Manoeuvres in the Dark. Later that year, Models travelled to United Kingdom to record their next album, Models' Media, with Julian Mendelsohn and Mark Opitz, at Trevor Horn's state-of-the-art SARM West Studios in London.

== Song meaning ==
According to Freud, he was playing around with a tune called "Engine Driver" but did not like it. After encouragement from other band members, he wrote a chorus and it was renamed "Out Of Mind Out Of Sight". One reviewer described the song as "A bloated bag of pop clichés in praise of aerobics and feeling horny". However, Freud said the song is for his wife, Sally, it describes his love and promise to remain faithful – "Keeping my body tight".

== Track listing ==
Australian 7-inch vinyl release Mushroom Records (K 9673)

1. "Out of Mind, Out of Sight" (James Freud) – 3:38
2. "Seeing Is Believing" (Sean Kelly) – 3:36

International 7-inch vinyl release Geffen Records (928 762-7)

1. "Out of Mind, Out of Sight" (Freud) – 3:34
2. "Down in the Garden" (Kelly, Roger Mason) – 4:30

Australian 12-inch vinyl release Mushroom Records (X-14198)

1. "Out of Mind, Out of Sight (The Nnix Mmix!)" (Freud) – 5:58
2. "Seeing Is Believing" (Kelly) – 3:36
3. "Out of Mind, Out of Sight" (Freud) – 3:38

International 12-inch vinyl release Geffen Records (0-20435)

1. "Out of Mind, Out of Sight (Extended Dance Mix)" (Freud) – 6:18
2. "Seeing Is Believing" (Kelly) – 3:35
3. "Tropic of Cancer" (Kelly) – 4:28

== Personnel ==
Credited to:

Models members

- James Freud – bass guitar, vocals
- Sean Kelly – lead guitar, vocals
- Roger Mason – keyboards
- Barton Price – drums
- James Valentine – saxophone

Additional musicians

- Zan Abeyratne – backing vocals ("Out Of Mind Out Of Sight") also toured with Models
- Kate Ceberano – backing vocals ("Out Of Mind Out Of Sight") also toured with Models

Production details

- Producer – Mark Opitz
- Engineer – Chris Corr ("Out Of Mind Out Of Sight"), David Nicholas ("Seeing Is Believing")
- Remix – Nick Launay ("Out Of Mind Out Of Sight (The Nmix Mmix!)"); Stephen Thompson & Michael Barbiero ("Out of Mind Out of Sight (Extended Dance Mix)")
- Studios – Platinum Studios, Melbourne ("Out Of Mind Out Of Sight"); Rhinoceros Studios, Sydney ("Seeing Is Believing")
  - Remix studios – Mediasound, New York ("Out Of Mind Out Of Sight (Extended Dance Mix)")

Artwork

- Okidoke – cover art, photography

== Charts ==
=== Weekly charts ===
Chart (1985–1986)	Peak position
Australia (Kent Music Report)	1
New Zealand (Recorded Music NZ)	3
US Billboard Hot 100	37

=== Year-end charts ===
Chart (1985)	Position
Australia (Kent Music Report)	6
