= The Pleasure of Your Company =

Studio album by Models
- Released: 24 October 1983
- Recorded: Paradise Studios, Sydney, Australia; March–May 1983
- Genre: New wave
- Label: Mushroom
- Producer: Nick Launay

Models chronology
| Local &/or General (1981) | The Pleasure of Your Company (1983) | Out of Mind, Out of Sight (1985) |

Singles from The Pleasure of Your Company
- 1. "I Hear Motion" Released: 20 September 1983; 2. "No Shoulders, No Head" Released: December, 1983; 3. "God Bless America" Released: April, 1984

The Pleasure of Your Company is the third studio album by Australian new wave rock band Models, which peaked at No. 12 on the Australian albums chart. It was released in October 1983 on Mushroom Records with Nick Launay producing. The album provided three singles, "I Hear Motion" released in September, which peaked at No. 16. Neither "No Shoulders, No Head" released in December, nor "God Bless America" released in April 1984, peaked into the Australian Top 50 singles chart. The video for "God Bless America", from March 1984, featured backing singers Kate Ceberano and Zan Abeyratne (both members of I'm Talking).

At the 1983 Countdown Music Awards, the album was nominated for Best Australian Album.

== Background ==
Models had formed in Melbourne in 1978 by members from Teenage Radio Stars and JAM, after some line-up changes they were Andrew Duffield on keyboards, Mark Ferrie on bass guitar, Janis Friedenfelds (aka Johnny Crash) on drums and percussion, and Sean Kelly on vocals and lead guitar. In November 1980, Models released their first album, Alphabravocharliedeltaechofoxtrotgolf, on Mushroom Records. It peaked at No. 43 on the Australian albums chart. The album was well received by audiences on the live pub circuit. Early in 1981, Friedenfelds was replaced on drums by Mark Hough (aka Buster Stiggs) from New Zealand band The Swingers. In June, Models released a 10" album, Cut Lunch, which consisted of demo tracks produced by Tony Cohen and Models except "Atlantic Romantic" produced by Split Enz keyboard player Eddie Rayner and Models. After recording Cut Lunch, Models travelled to United Kingdom to record, Local &/or General, with Steve Tayler producing.

During 1982, further line-up changes occurred with Ferrie and Hough leaving early in the year. James Freud (ex-Teenage Radio Stars, James Freud & Berlin) joined the band on bass/vocals, with John Rowell (ex-Curse) on guitar, and Graham Scott (ex-Curse) on drums. Kelly and Freud had been in high school bands which developed into Teenage Radio Stars, Rowell and Scott left in May 1982, with Duffield following. New Zealand drummer, Barton Price (ex-Crocodiles, Sardine v) joined. They recorded a single, "On", produced by veteran rocker Lobby Loyde and released in August. It had no mainstream National singles chart success, but peaked at No. 1 on the independent charts. Gus Till (ex-Beargarden) briefly joined on keyboards until Duffield rejoined the band in December.

The Duffield, Freud, Kelly and Price version of the group released the highly regarded 1983 LP The Pleasure of Your Company, produced by Nick Launay. Its big drum sound and danceability, in particular, reflected Launay's influence, and Freud's more radio-friendly voice made the album more accessible. The album was critically acclaimed and peaked at No. 12 on the Australian albums chart, with the single "I Hear Motion" becoming a national No. 16 hit. Duffield later explained that the song's distinctive keyboard part had been inspired by the riff from the Stevie Wonder classic "Superstition". The band also released two other singles, "God Bless America" and "No Shoulders, No Head", neither charted into the Top 50. The band scored the support slot for David Bowie's 'Serious Moonlight' tour of Australia. Kelly and Duffield were invited to sing backing vocals on the INXS album, The Swing. The video for "God Bless America", from March 1984, featured backing singers Kate Ceberano and Zan Abeyratne (both members of I'm Talking). The music video was shot in 3D. Kelly appeared ready to disband Models and was even rehearsing with a new band. Mushroom Records convinced him to continue with Models and their next single, "Big on Love" produced by Reggie Lucas, peaked at No. 24.

By late 1984, Models relocated to Sydney and Duffield – with his crucial influence on the band's sound – was forced out under acrimonious circumstances to be replaced by Roger Mason (ex- James Freud's Berlin) on keyboards and James Valentine on saxophone. In early 1985, Models started recording material for their next album, Out of Mind, Out of Sight, produced by Mark Opitz, Reggie Lucas and Nick Launay. In October 2010, The Pleasure of Your Company was listed in the top 50 in the book, 100 Best Australian Albums.

== Track listing ==
All tracks are written by Andrew Duffield, Sean Kelly, James Freud, Barton Price unless otherwise shown.

The Pleasure of Your Company
| No. | Title | Length |
|---|---|---|
| 1. | "I Hear Motion" | 5:31 |
| 2. | "Facing the North Pole in August" | 3:31 |
| 3. | "God Bless America" | 3:41 |
| 4. | "Watch Your Mouth" | 3:30 |
| 5. | "No Shoulders, No Head" | 3:30 |
| 6. | "Holy Creation"" | 4:44 |
| 7. | "79 A.D." | 4:51 |
| 8. | "Sang the Butcher" | 3:17 |
| 9. | "Our Atmosphere" | 3:50 |
| 10. | "A Rainy Day" | 3:43 |

== Personnel ==
Models

- Andrew Duffield – keyboards, vocals
- James Freud – bass guitar, saxophone, vocals
- Sean Kelly – guitar, lead vocals
- Barton Price – drums, vocals

Additional personnel

- Zan Abeyratne – backing vocals ("God Bless America")
- Nadia Anderson – vocals ("No Shoulders, No Head")
- Kate Ceberano – backing vocals ("God Bless America")
- Deckchairs Overboard – vocals ("No Shoulders, No Head")
- Eric 'Fire Hazard' Gradman – violin ("79 A.D.")
- Jenny Morris – vocals ("No Shoulders, No Head")
- Johanna Pigott – vocals ("No Shoulders, No Head")

Technical personnel

- Nick Launay – Producer, engineer, Mixing
