= Out of Mind, Out of Sight (album) =

Studio album by Models
- Released: September 1985
- Recorded: Early 1985
- Genre: Rock
- Label: Mushroom
- Producer: Nick Launay, Reggie Lucas, Mark Opitz

Models chronology
Pleasure of your Company (1983)	Out of Mind, Out of Sight (1985)	Models' Media (1986)

Singles from Out of Mind, Out of Sight
- 1. "Big on Love" Released: 18 November 1984; 2. "Barbados" Released: 21 March 1985; 3. "Out of Mind, Out of Sight" Released: June 1985; 4. "Cold Fever" Released: October 1985; 5. "King of Kings" Released: December 1985

Professional ratings
Review scores
Source	Rating
AllMusic	2.5/5 stars

Out of Mind, Out of Sight is the fourth studio album by Australian new wave rock band Models. It was their most successful album and peaked at no. 3 on the Australian albums chart. It was released in September 1985 by Mushroom Records, with Nick Launay, Reggie Lucas and Mark Opitz producing.

The album provided five singles, with the first being "Big on Love" which was released in November 1984 and peaked at No. 24. Second single "Barbados" released in March 1985 peaked at No. 2, with the third single "Out of Mind, Out of Sight" released in July, which peaked at no. 1, being their best performed single. "Cold Fever" released in October peaked into the Top 50 but "King of Kings" their December release did not. In 1986, Geffen Records released Out of Mind, Out of Sight in the United States and it appeared on the Billboard 200 albums chart, with the single, "Out of Sight, Out of Mind", peaking at No. 37 on the Billboard Hot 100 singles chart

== Background ==
Models was formed in Melbourne in 1978 by members from Teenage Radio Stars and JAB. After some line-up changes they were Andrew Duffield on keyboards, Mark Ferrie on bass guitar, Janis Friedenfelds (aka Johnny Crash) on drums and percussion, and Sean Kelly on vocals and lead guitar. In November 1980, Models released their first album, Alphabravocharliedeltaechofoxtrotgolf, on Mushroom Records. By 1982, more line-up changes occurred, Ferrie and Friedenfelds had left and James Freud (ex-Teenage Radio Stars, James Freud & Berlin) joined the band on bass/vocals. New Zealand drummer, Barton Price (ex-Crocodiles, Sardine v) joined later in 1982.

The Duffield, Freud, Kelly, and Price version of the group released the album The Pleasure of Your Company, produced by Nick Launay. By late 1984, Models relocated to Sydney and Duffield left the band, replaced by Roger Mason on keyboards and James Valentine on saxophone. For touring during 1984–1985, the group was regularly augmented by backing singers Kate Ceberano, Zan Abeyratne (both members of I'm Talking); and in 1985, Canadian-born singer Wendy Matthews joined.

== The album ==
In early 1985, Models started recording material for Out of Mind, Out of Sight, produced by Mark Opitz, Reggie Lucas, and Nick Launay. It was their fourth studio album. On 13 July 1985, Models performed four songs for the Oz for Africa concert (part of the global Live Aid program) – "Big on Love", "I Hear Motion", "Stormy Tonight", "Out of Mind, Out of Sight". It was broadcast in Australia (on both Seven Network and Nine Network) and on MTV in the US. They then went on a national tour with I'm Talking in July 1985. The band released Out of Mind, Out of Sight in August or September 1985 on Mushroom Records. For the album, the band members were Freud, Kelly, Mason, Matthews, Price, and Valentine, with Ceberano, Zan Abeyratne]], and her twin sister, Sherine Abeyratne (Big Pig) on backing vocals.

It was their most successful album, and peaked at no. 3 on the Australian albums chart.

The album provided five singles, with the first being "Big on Love" released well in advance of its album, in November 1984, which peaked at No. 24. Second single "Barbados" released in March 1985, which peaked at No. 2, had been written by Freud and Duffield, and was a reggae influenced song. It related a tale of alcoholism and suicide, and later provided Freud with the titles of his two autobiographies, I Am the Voice Left from Drinking and I Am the Voice Left from Rehab. The video clip, directed by Richard Lowenstein, was influenced by the film, The Deer Hunter.

The third single, "Out of Mind, Out of Sight" released in July, which peaked at No. 1, was their best performed single. It was written by Freud, who was now writing or co-writing most of the Models' songs, and was the only No. 1 single on the Australian singles chart for 1985 by an Australian artist. "Cold Fever" released in October peaked into the Top 50 but "King of Kings" their December release did not. Proceeds for "King of Kings" were donated to the Salvation Army.

In 1986, Geffen Records released Out of Mind, Out of Sight in the United States and it appeared on the Billboard 200 albums chart, with the single, "Out of Sight, Out of Mind", peaking at No. 37 on the Billboard Hot 100 singles chart. The band toured the US in November 1986 supporting Orchestral Manoeuvres in the Dark.

Later that year, Models travelled to UK to record their next album, Models' Media, with Julian Mendelsohn and Mark Opitz, at Trevor Horn's state-of-the-art SARM West Studios in London. Models' Media, released in December which peaked at No. 30, was less successful than Out of Mind, Out of Sight.

== Track listing ==
=== Vinyl release (RML-53166) ===
1. "Out of Mind, Out of Sight" (James Freud) – 3:38
2. "Big on Love" (Sean Kelly, Reggie Lucas) – 3:52
3. "Ringing Like a Bell" (Kelly) – 3:37
4. "Stormy Tonight" (Freud) – 4:14
5. "These Blues" (Freud) – 4:28
6. "Cold Fever" (Freud) – 3:30
7. "Sooner in Heaven" (Freud) – 3:33
8. "Seeing Is Believing" (Kelly) – 3:36
9. "Barbados" (Freud, Andrew Duffield) – 4:14
10. "King of Kings" (Kelly) – 4:35

=== CD extra tracks (CD-53166) ===
1. "Big on Love" [12" version] – 6:07
2. "Barbados" [12" version] – 6:40
3. "Out of Mind, Out of Sight" [12" version] – 5:58

=== Cassette extra tracks (RMC-53166) ===
1. "Out of Mind, Out of Sight" (12" version)
2. "Big on Love" (12" Australian mix)
3. "Barbados" (12" version)
4. "Tropic of Cancer" (Kelly)
5. "Preacher of the Black Lagoon" (Freud, Kelly)
6. "Blue Moon" (Rodgers, Hart)
7. "Steamroller Blues" (Taylor)

== Personnel ==
Adapted from AllMusic and Discogs.

Models members

- James Freud – bass guitar, vocals
- Sean Kelly – lead guitar, vocals
- Wendy Matthews – backing vocals ("Cold Fever")
- Roger Mason – keyboards
- Barton Price – drums
- James Valentine – saxophone

Additional musicians

- Sherine Abeyratne – backing vocals ("Big on Love")
- Zan Abeyratne – backing vocals ("Out of Mind, Out of Sight", "Barbados") also toured with Models
- Kate Ceberano – backing vocals ("Out of Mind, Out of Sight", "Barbados") also toured with Models
- Ray Pereira – conga ("Sooner in Heaven")

Production details

- Producer – Nick Launay, Reggie Lucas^{[A]}, Mark Opitz^{[B]}
- Engineer – Chris Corr, Julian Mendelsohn^{[A]}
- Mastering – Paul Ibbotson

Artwork

- Paul Clarke – photography
- Okidoke – cover art, photography

Notes

- A "Big on Love" and its 12" remix were produced by Reggie Lucas and engineered by Julian Mendelsohn
- B The 12" versions of "Barbados" and "Out of Mind, Out of Sight" were produced by Mark Opitz

== Charts ==
=== Weekly charts ===
Chart (1985)	Peak position
Australia (Kent Music Report)	3
New Zealand Albums (RMNZ)	8

=== Year-end charts ===
Chart (1985)	Peak position
Australia (Kent Music Report)	17
