= Cut Lunch =

EP by Models
- Released: June 1981
- Recorded: Richmond Records, Melbourne 1981 "Atlantic Romantic" at AAV, Melbourne 1981
- Genre: New wave
- Length: 20:42
- Label: Mushroom
- Producer: Tony Cohen, Models "Atlantic Romantic" by Eddie Rayner, Models

Models chronology
Alphabravocharliedelta echofoxtrotgolf (1980)	Cut Lunch (1981)	Local and/or General (1981)

Cut Lunch is a mini-album or EP by Australian new wave band Models, originally released on 10" vinyl by Mushroom Records in June 1981.

The collection started off as demo recordings, which proved successful enough to release just before the group went to England to record their second album proper, Local and/or General. One track, "Man o' Action", was re-recorded for that album. Cut Lunch is generally regarded as the Models' release which is the most influenced by post-punk and dub, and least by conventional pop music. Apart from "Atlantic Romantic", which had been a live favourite of the group for a number of years, the songs were freshly composed: their lyrics were difficult to understand, and remain confusing even now. "Atlantic Romantic" was co-produced by Eddie Rayner of Split Enz fame.

A seven-and-a-half minute promotional music video was released for the mini-album, which combined videos for brief excerpts of each of the tracks (including a crude home-made claymation video for "Germ") with vox pop interviews conducted by the band members in the streets of Melbourne. No single was released, although "Two Cabs to the Toucan" was promoted on Countdown. Cut Lunch peaked at #37 in the Australian albums charts and at #38 on the singles charts. "Cut Lunch", the title track, and "Two Cabs to the Toucan" were the most played tracks on radio.

== Track listing ==
All tracks are written by Sean Kelly unless otherwise shown

Cut Lunch
No.	Title	Writer(s)	Length
1.	"Two Cabs to the Toucan"	Andrew Duffield, Sean Kelly	3:19
2.	"Germ (Teradacity Cometh)"		2:12
3.	"Atlantic Romantic"		3:29
4.	"Unfaithful to the Corps"	Mark Ferrie	3:29
5.	"Man O' Action"	Sean Kelly, Mark Hough	3:30
6.	"Cut Lunch"		4:43

== Personnel ==
=== Musicians ===
- Andrew Duffield – keyboards
- Mark Ferrie – bass guitar
- Sean Kelly – guitar, clarinet, vocals
- Buster Stiggs – drums

=== Production ===
- Producer – Tony Cohen
- Producer – Eddie Rayner ("Atlantic Romantic")
- Producer – Models
