= Big on Love =

Single by Models

from the album Out of Mind, Out of Sight
- B-side: "Preacher from the Black Lagoon"
- Released: 18 November 1984
- Genre: New wave, rock
- Length: 3:52
- Label: Mushroom Records
- Songwriter(s): Sean Kelly, Reggie Lucas
- Producer(s): Reggie Lucas

Models singles chronology
"Tropic of Cancer" (1984)	"Big on Love" (1984)	"Barbados" (1985)

Big on Love is a song by Australian new wave rock band Models. It was released as a single on 18 November 1984, well ahead of its parent album, Out of Mind, Out of Sight, which was issued in August 1985. It peaked at No. 24 on the Australian Kent Music Report Singles Chart in December 1984, remaining at that position for two weeks. It was produced for Mushroom Records by Reggie Lucas, and was co-written by Sean Kelly, the group's lead guitarist and lead vocalist, and Lucas. For the single, Models line up was Kelly, James Freud on backing vocals and bass guitar, Andrew Duffield on keyboards, and Barton Price on drums.
