= Chris Murphy (manager) =

Australian music executive (1954–2021)

Chris Murphy OAM
- Born: Christopher Mark Murphy; 9 November 1954; Darlinghurst, New South Wales, Australia
- Died: 16 January 2021 (aged 66); Ballina, New South Wales, Australia
- Occupations: Band manager, entrepreneur
- Years active: 1971–2021
- Spouse: Caroline Paidasch
- Children: 5
- Parent(s): Mark Murphy (father), Janice née Thomsen (mother)

Christopher Mark Murphy OAM (9 November 1954 – 16 January 2021) was an Australian music and multimedia entrepreneur. He was the band manager for INXS (late 1979 to June 1995, December 2008 to November 2012) and Models (from late 1984 to mid-1987). He died on 16 January 2021, aged 66, after being diagnosed with mantle cell lymphoma.

Murphy was awarded the Medal of the Order of Australia posthumously in the 2024 Australia Day Honours for "service to the performing arts through music".

== Early life ==
Christopher Mark Murphy was born on 9 November 1954 and grew up in Darlinghurst. His father, Mark Murphy, had run a theatrical booking agency, Mark Murphy & Associates, in Wollongong since 1960. A year after Mark died in 1969, Murphy, at the age of 16, joined his mother in running the agency but shifted its focus to rock music acts. Initially called Solo Management Agency, it became part of Murphy Media Academy (MMA) which eventually had offices in Australia and internationally.

== Manager of INXS (1979–1995) ==
Murphy continued as a booking agent until late in 1979 when he met with Gary Morris, then-manager of Australian rock groups Midnight Oil and INXS. Morris wanted to focus on Midnight Oil and asked Murphy to look after INXS, Murphy recalled:

The night Morris offered them to me, I told him I'd take them midway through their third song. I stood there thinking, "This is pretty funky'. This kid up front is pretty weird. This band plays really, really well ... What Morris didn't realise was that I only intended to take them on as their booking agent. I didn't want to be their manager.

— Chris Murphy

Nevertheless, by 1980 Murphy had "dissolved his rock agency and became manager of the band". He subsequently hired Gary Grant as the group's touring manager and by 1982 Grant was his business partner at MMA Management. In July that year Murphy had brokered a deal with Atco Records for INXS after "[he] had made numerous overseas trips setting up contacts". Grant declared that the "direct signing to a US label was one of the crucial elements in INXS's success". In 1983 MMA set up an office in New York and during the next three years either Murphy or Grant spent "10, 11 months of each year there".

In late 1984 Melbourne-based alternative rock group, Models, were considering breaking up, their label Mushroom Records tempted them with an offer of recording with US producer Reggie Lucas. INXS encouraged Murphy to sign the group to MMA: under his influence Models pursued a more commercial sound to a radio-friendly format. Models relocated to Sydney and long-term member, Andrew Duffield, was forced out of the group by Murphy under "controversial circumstances".

According to The Canberra Times' Tony Sarno "in the industry [Grant] and his partner [Murphy] are seen as good operators". By April 1986 INXS were "selling records overseas. Lots of them. [Grant] delights in telling how INXS, no, MMA Management as well have calculated success in America. He talks quickly, with an authority bordering on aggression".

Jenny Morris (ex-The Crocodiles, QED) told Stuart Coupe of The Canberra Times that back in 1985 Murphy "rang up and said, 'Why don't you come on the road with INXS for a couple of weeks and fill in a bit of time' ... I thought I might as well, and that turned into a two years thing that meant I did two world tours with the band". Morris had supplied backing vocals on their April 1984 album, The Swing, she performed a duet with INXS' lead singer, Michael Hutchence on their cover version of "Jackson" (also in April on Dekadance), and toured with them from 1985.

Under the management of Murphy and Grant, INXS went from a Sydney pub band to playing international venues including headlining a show at Wembley Stadium in July 1991 with 74,000 in attendance. INXS sold more than 30 million albums worldwide. Murphy also assisted in the commercial success of Models, which achieved two hits on the Kent Music Report Singles Chart in 1985, "Barbados" (March, No. 2) and "Out of Mind, Out of Sight" (July, No. 1).

During October 1986 Murphy and Grant teamed with fellow managers Jeremy Fabinyi (Mental as Anything), Mark Pope (Jimmy Barnes, Divinyls), and Ken West (I'm Talking) to stage the Australian Made series of concerts. The tour performance order was Mental as Anything, I'm Talking, The Triffids, The Saints, Divinyls, Models, Barnes and INXS. It began in Hobart in December and visited all state capitals ending in Sydney in late January the following year. Although the tour had been announced with claims of Australian mateship and cooperation, arguments ensued between various band managers over the proposed concert series film. Some bands felt they had been coerced into unfavourable tour contracts. The tour ended in a fracas when Murphy and Fabinyi argued backstage in Sydney and came to blows.

In the 1980s Murphy invested in digital broadcasting and music sales but also organic farming. He created a large-scale free range/organic chicken operation and ran a business for daily delivery of organic lamb to restaurants around the world. In 1987 Murphy was rated by BRW magazine as Australian Entrepreneur of the Year. In 1988 he established an independent record label, rooART, with Sebastian Chase (of Chase Records) and Justin Van Stom (formerly of MMA). It was initially distributed by PolyGram.

Murphy signed Australian acts to rooArt including Crash Politics, The Hummingbirds, Ratcat and You Am I. In June 1991 Ratcat had simultaneous number-one single, "Don't Go Now", and album, Blind Love, on the ARIA charts. In 1992 Murphy signed a deal with Time Warner Inc. for international distribution. In February 1995 You Am I had a number-one album with Hi Fi Way. Later rooArt acts included Wendy Matthews (ex-Models) and The Screaming Jets which also helped the label become more commercially popular in Australia. In the 1990s, he sold his publishing company, MMA Music, to PolyGram Music Publishing.

== rooART and Petrol Records ==
By June 1995, Murphy resigned his position with INXS to spend more time with his children. Ed Nimmervoll, a music journalist, observed that by the mid-1990s INXS' popularity had started to wane whereas "during [INXS'] rise [Murphy] had used strongarm tactics on the band's behalf, and now when the band needed moral support, maybe because of [his] past efforts that support was less inclined to be offered. [He] and the band decided to part ways". Initially Murphy focussed on rooART, which was sold to BMG by October in the following year. He had purchased a 50% stake in Australian Style magazine and invested in Sydney radio station 2SM. Over the next four years, 2SM's earnings doubled and Australian Style magazine's increased by 40%. Murphy was attracted to digital technology and formed one of Australia's first digital music broadcasting companies, Digital One, in 1999.

Petrol Records Pty Ltd emerged in 2001. Murphy curated a number of world music compilation albums under the banner of Seriously Good Music. The series sold in large numbers and produced over 500 Top 20 hits. This led to deals with Time Warner LIFE and iTunes, and receiving a Grammy Award nomination. Each of the eleven albums in Petrol's Seriously Good Music series focused on a specific genre or subgenre, such as Burlesque. Another of his ventures was the Not Lost in Translation series, accessing foreign language for youth culture zeitgeists.

In 2008 Murphy rejoined forces with INXS signing them to Petrol Electric and after two years they issued an album, Original Sin (November 2010). The album has guest vocalists re-recording earlier material by the band.

In 2016, Murphy sold a 50% stake of Petrol to UMG (Universal Music Group), which went on to sign a number of new bands such as the self-styled Australian 'Hippie Country' trio The Buckleys (siblings Sarah, Lachlan and Molly Buckley)

== Murphy Rights Management (2014–2021) ==
In April 2014, Murphy created Murphy Rights Management, a music entertainment company.
