= Local and/or General =

Studio album by Models
- Released: October 1981
- Recorded: Farmyard Studios, Bucks, United Kingdom
- Genre: New wave
- Label: Mushroom
- Producer: Stephen W Tayler, Models

Models chronology
| Cut Lunch (1980) | Local and/or General (1981) | Pleasure of your Company (1983) |

Singles from Local and/or General
- 1. "Local and/or General" Released: November 1981; 2. "Unhappy" Released: December 1982

Local &/or General is the second studio album by Australian new wave rock band Models, which peaked at #30 on the Australian albums chart. It was released in October 1981 on Mushroom Records with Stephen W Tayler producing.

Early in 1981, Janis Friedenfelds was replaced on drums by Mark Hough (a.k.a. Buster Stiggs) from New Zealand band The Swingers. Prior to flying to the United Kingdom to record Local &/Or General, Models had made some demo recordings, which proved successful enough to be released as an EP, Cut Lunch in June. One track, "Man o' Action", from that EP was re-recorded for Local &/or General. The album provided two singles, "Local and/or General" in November and "Unhappy" in 1982, neither peaked into the Australian Top 50 singles chart.

== Reception ==
Kelly said, "I got an interesting review in London in Sounds Magazine or Melody Maker. It said I sounded like David Bowie being boned up the arse."

== Track listing ==
All tracks are written by Sean Kelly and Andrew Duffield unless otherwise shown

Local and/or General
| No. | Title | Writer(s) | Length |
|---|---|---|---|
| 1. | "Local and/or General" | Sean Kelly | 3:20 |
| 2. | "Truth About Truth About Scientists" | | 2:22 |
| 3. | "Unhappy" | Mark Ferrie, Andrew Duffield | 3:22 |
| 4. | "Telstar" | Joe Meek | 0:55 |
| 5. | "Dying for My Country at the War" | Sean Kelly | 3:39 |
| 6. | "Drive and Reflex" | | 5:00 |
| 7. | "Bantam Had" | Sean Kelly | 4:04 |
| 8. | "Man O' Action" | Sean Kelly, Mark Hough | 3:40 |
| 9. | "Drunk in the House" | Sean Kelly, Andrew Duffield, Mark Ferrie, Mark Hough | 3:06 |
| 10. | "Tearing Hair Out" | Sean Kelly | 3:33 |
| 11. | "Rate of Change" | | 3:16 |

== Personnel ==
Credited to:

=== Musicians ===
Models

- Andrew Duffield — keyboards, EMS Synthi AKS
- Mark Ferrie — bass guitar
- Janis Freidenfelds (a.k.a. Johnny Crash) — percussion, traps, syncussion
- Sean Kelly — guitar, clarinet, vocals

=== Production ===
- Producer — Stephen W Tayler, Models
- Engineer — Stephen W Tayler, Tony Cohen
- Mix Engineer: Stephen W Tayler
- Re-mix — Steve Brown
- Artwork — Roy Snell
- Photography — Anton Corbijn

== In pop culture ==
The album gives its title to the name of a radio program focussing on new Australian music on Melbourne radio station Triple R.

Television music quiz program RocKwiz has a round on general music knowledge titled "Local and/or General" after the album.
