= Barbados (Models song) =

Single by Models

from the album Out of Mind, Out of Sight
- Released: March 1985
- Recorded: 1985
- Length: 4:15
- Label: Mushroom
- Songwriters: James Freud, Andrew Duffield
- Producers: Nick Launay, Reggie Lucas, Mark Opitz

Models singles chronology
"Big on Love" (1984)	"Barbados" (1985)	"Out of Mind, Out of Sight" (1985)

"Barbados" is a song by Australian band Models. It was the second single from their 1985 album Out of Mind, Out of Sight. The song was released in March 1985, and reached #2 on the Australian music charts.

== Composition and recording ==
The song is about Models bassist James Freud's alcoholism. The title of the first of Freud's autobiographical books I Am the Voice Left From Drinking is from lyrics in the song.

Co-composer Andrew Duffield later said, "I wrote the music for it and I really hated it. It's a dinky little piece of music. James had this metaphor in the song about drinking, which I thought was too obscure for the general public to pick up on. That was kinda lost on me."

Duffield was also unimpressed with producer Reggie Lucas, saying, "We'd say 'that's a bit obvious for us Reggie' and he'd reply 'Do you guys want to be on MTV or what?' We just kinda let him go and ended up remixing using Mark Opitz anyway."

== Music video ==
In the promotional video, James Freud is seen in a bar behaving all drunk with his bandmates and is, in some black and white scenes, shown driving an army jeep while pointing a gun at his head. He commits suicide at the end of the video. In November 2010, James Freud actually committed suicide, but it has not been disclosed how he died. The song and general mood of the video matched James' own personal demons.

== Charts ==
=== Weekly charts ===
Weekly chart performance for "Barbados"
Chart (1985)	Peak position
Australia (Kent Music Report)	2

=== Year-end charts ===
Year-end chart performance for "Barbados"
Chart (1985)	Position
Australia (Kent Music Report)	35
