= Roger Mason (musician) =

Australian keyboardist

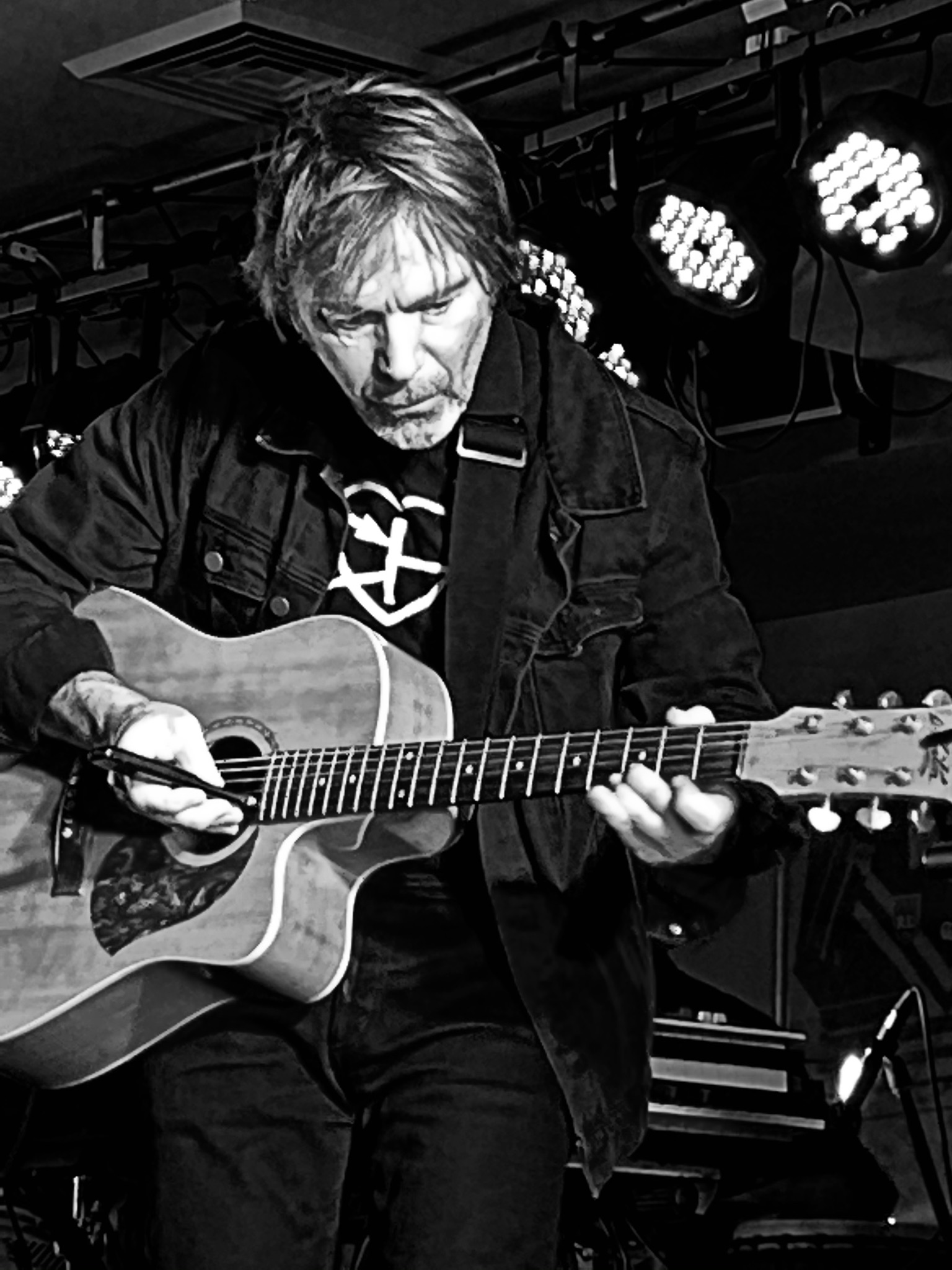

Background information
- Born: Roger Ashley Mason
- Genres: New wave; funk rock
- Occupations: Keyboardist; songwriter; screen music composer; vocals; multi-instrumentalist; TV composer
- Instruments: Keyboards; piano; guitar; dulcimer; cello; traditional and ancient instruments
- Years active: 1979–present
- Website: rogermasoncomposer.com

Roger Ashley Mason is an Australian keyboardist who has been a member of new wave groups Models, Absent Friends and Icehouse. He was a session and backing musician for United Kingdom's Gary Numan and for various Australian artists. From the early 1990s he has composed music for television and feature films.

He appeared on Models best performed album, Out of Mind, Out of Sight (1985), which reached No. 3 on the Australian Kent Music Report Albums Chart and provided a No. 2 hit "Barbados" and a No. 1 hit "Out of Mind, Out of Sight". On 27 October 2010, Models were inducted into the ARIA Hall of Fame by former member, Wendy Matthews.

As a composer, Mason has won 12 Australasian Performing Right Association (APRA) Awards for his TV and film work, MDA (presented in 2003), The Extra (2005), Peking to Paris (2006), The Last Confession of Alexander Pearce (2009), My Place (2010), The Outlaw Michael Howe (2014), The Code (2015), The Principal (2016) and Hungry Ghosts (2021).

== Biography ==
=== Early years ===
Roger Ashley Mason was a keyboardist in Colt early in 1979. He joined vocalist and guitarist James Freud (ex-Spread, Teenage Radio Stars) in James Freud & the Radio Stars with fellow Colt members Murray Doherty on bass guitar, Glenn McGrath on drums and Bryan Thomas on guitar, and later Tony Harvey on guitar and Mick Prague on bass. This line up plus various guest artists recorded the album " Breaking Silence" between July and November 1979 with further contributions made by Tony Lugton and Peter Cook before its completion and release in 1980. Further changes by year's end resulted in Freud and Mason joined by Peter Cook on guitar and backing vocals and Tommy Hosie on drums. They signed with Mushroom Records and their debut single, "Modern Girl," was released in May 1980, which peaked at No. 12 on the Australian Kent Music Report Singles Chart. They supported the English singer-keyboardist, Gary Numan, on his Australian tour. James Freud & the Radio Stars' debut album Breaking Silence was released in June, it was produced by Tony Cohen. Numan liked the album and offered to produce the next one in London, as there was already a UK band called The Radio Stars, a name change to James Freud & Berlin occurred. While in London, Mason joined Numan's backing band and was recorded on the live album, Living Ornaments '80. Neither Freud nor Numan were happy with the London-recorded album for James Freud & Berlin and it was not released and one month later, in March 1981, Freud disbanded the group. Freud and Mason returned to the UK with the intention of forming a new band, Orient-R, which only played a single performance before disbanding. Mason then went on to join Numan's touring band, and appeared on Numan's 1981 album, Dance and subsequent 1982 album, I, Assassin. While in London, Mason worked for glam rock guitarist, Rob Dean (ex-Japan) on a potential solo album. By 1984, Mason and Dean had combined with Hugo Burnham (Gang of Four) and Australian singer and bass guitarist Philip Foxman (Supernaut) to form funk rock outfit, Illustrated Man. They released a six-track mini-LP, Illustrated Man, then toured to New York but soon disbanded.

=== Models ===
In late 1984, Mason re-joined with Freud to replace Andrew Duffield on keyboards in Models. He appeared on their best performed album, Out of Mind, Out of Sight which reached No. 3 on the Australian Kent Music Report Albums Chart and spawned a No. 2 hit "Barbados" and a No. 1 hit "Out of Mind, Out of Sight". With Mason and Freud, the line-up of Models was Sean Kelly on lead guitar and vocals, Canadian-born Wendy Matthews on backing vocals, New Zealand-born Barton Price on drums and James Valentine on saxophone. Their final studio album, Models' Media was released in December 1986, which peaked in the Top 30 and the band had a slot on the Australian Made Tour into early 1987. Mason as lead singer and Kelly, formed a side-project, The Clampetts, to record cover versions of nine country music tracks, which was released in 1987 as The Last Hoedown.

=== Later projects ===
Mason joined Jenny Morris's backing band late in 1987, together with Amanda Vincent (ex-Eurogliders), Jehan Lindsay (Richard Clapton Band), Paul Burton (Mark Williams Band) following the release of Morris' debut solo album, Body and Soul.

In 1988 Mason toured with Los Angeles new wave group Wall of Voodoo and appeared on their live album The Ugly Americans in Australia. In late 1989 Mason re-united with former Models members, Kelly and Matthews performing on Absent Friends' first single, "Hallelujah". Mason then toured with Icehouse, following the release of their seventh studio album, Code Blue. He also was a member of Tommy Emmanuel's touring band between 1988 and 1992. In 1990, Matthews recorded her debut solo album Émigré with the assistance of Mason and various bandmates, Garry Gary Beers (Absent Friends, INXS), Kelly, Mick King (Absent Friends), Valentine and Duffield as well as Tim Finn and Peter Blakeley. Mason wrote her hit song, "Token Angels" which reached No. 18 on the Australian singles chart and won Matthews an ARIA Award in 1991 for 'Breakthrough Artist – Single'.

1992 saw Mason (keyboards) join Johnny Diesel's Rock 'n' Soul Tour, with Kane Baker on drums, Leslie Barlow on backing vocals, Matthew Branton on guitar and Jim Hilbun on bass guitar. In 1997, Mason teamed up with Graeme Revell to create the album Vision II - Spirit of Rumi, released through New York based Angel Records. The two coproduced, supplied some of the instrumental accompaniment, and set to music 11 poems by renowned 13th century poet Jalāl ad-Dīn Muhammad Rūmī. Vocals were provided by Noa, Lori Garson, Esther Dobong'Na Essiene a.k.a. Estha Divine, and the late Nusrat Fateh Ali Khan.

As a composer, Mason has won Australasian Performing Right Association (APRA) Awards for 'Best Soundtrack Album' for The Extra in 2005, 'Best Music for a Television Series or Serial' for Peking to Paris in 2006, 'Best Music for a Telemovie' for The Last Confession of Alexander Pearce in 2009, and Australian Academy of Cinema and Television Arts (AACTA) Awards for 'Best Original Music Score in Television' for The Code (Episode 1) (ABC) in 2015.{

On 27 October 2010, Models were inducted into the ARIA Hall of Fame by Matthews. He has played with Steve Kilbey and the Winged Heels.

== Awards and nominations ==
=== AGSC Awards ===
The Australian Guild of Screen Composers (AGSC) presented their annual awards for works by their members from 1996 to 2000. These awards were incorporated into the APRA Music Awards as the Screen Music Awards from 2002 (see below).

Year	Nominee / work	Award	Result	Ref.
1998	Africa's Elephant Kingdom (Roger Mason)	Best Music for a Documentary	Won	
1998	Africa's Elephant Kingdom (Mason) and Land of the Future Eaters (Robert Moss)	Best Original Music in a Television Series or Serial	Tied	
1999	The Day of the Roses (Mason)	Best Original Title Theme Composed for a Television Series, Serial or Mini-Series	Won	
1999	The Day of the Roses (Mason)	Best Music for a Mini-Series or a Telemovie	Won	
2000	Confessions of a Headhunter (Mason)	Best Original Music for a Short Film	Won	

=== ARIA Music Awards ===
The ARIA Music Awards is an annual awards ceremony that recognises excellence, innovation, and achievement across all genres of Australian music. They commenced in 1987.

Year	Nominee / work	Award	Result	Ref.
2005	The Extra	Best Original Cast or Show Album	Nominated	

=== APRA Music Awards ===
The APRA Music Awards are presented annually from 1982 by the Australasian Performing Right Association (APRA), "honouring composers and songwriters." After 2002 they also include the associated Screen Music Awards handed out by APRA, Australasian Mechanical Copyright Owners Society (AMCOS) and Australian Guild of Screen Composers (AGSC), which "acknowledges excellence and innovation in the field of screen composition."

Year	Nominee / work	Award	Result	Ref.
2003	Horses – The Story of Equus (Roger Mason)	Best Music for a Documentary	Won	
2003	MDA – "Episode 8" (Mason)	Best Music for a Television Series or Serial	Won	
2003	MDA (Mason)	Best Television Theme	Won	
2004	MDA – "Series 2, Episode 27" (Mason)	Best Music for a Television Series or Serial	Nominated	
2005	The Extra (Mason)	Feature Film Score of the Year	Nominated	
2005	The Extra (Mason)	Best Soundtrack Album	Won	
2006	Peking to Paris (Mason)	Best Music for a Television Series or Serial	Won	
2008	SBS Station ID – "Six Billion Stories & Counting" (Mason, Bryony Marks)	Best Music for an Advertisement	Nominated	
2009	The Last Confession of Alexander Pearce (Mason)	Best Music for a Mini-Series or Telemovie	Won	
2010	The Last Confession of Alexander Pearce (Mason)	Best Soundtrack Album	Nominated	
2010	My Place – "Episode 13: 1888 Victoria" (Mason)	Best Music for a Television Series or Serial	Nominated	
2010	My Place (Mason)	Best Television Theme	Won	
2011	My Place – "Season 2: Episode 1 – Henry 1878"	Best Music for Children's Television	Nominated	
2012	My Place – "Season 2: Episode 8 – Sarah 1798" (Mason)	Best Music for Children's Television	Nominated	
2012	This Dog's Life (Mason)	Best Music for a Short Film	Won	
2014	The Outlaw Michael Howe (Mason)	Best Music for a Mini-Series or Telemovie	Won	
2014	The Outlaw Michael Howe – "The Harvest & The Glory" (Mason)	Best Original Song Composed for the Screen	Nominated	
2015	The Code (Mason)	Best Music for a Television Series or Serial	Nominated	
2015	The Code (Mason)	Best Television Theme	Won	
2016	The Principal (Mason)	Best Music for a Television Series or Serial	Won	
2017	The Code (Mason)	Best Music for a Television Series or Serial	Nominated	
2020	The Commons (Mason)	Best Music for a Mini-Series or Telemovie	Nominated	
2020	The Commons (Mason)	Best Television Theme	Nominated	
2021	Hungry Ghosts (Mason)	Best Music for a Mini-Series or Telemovie	Won	
2021	Hungry Ghosts (Mason)	Best Television Theme	Nominated	
