= Models' Media =

Studio album by Models
- Released: December 1986
- Recorded: Sarm West Studios, London
- Genre: Rock
- Label: Mushroom Records
- Producer: Mark Opitz, Julian Mendelsohn

Models chronology
Out of Mind, Out of Sight (1985)	Models' Media (1986)	Models' Collection (1993)

Singles from Models' Media
- 1. "Evolution" Released: August __, 1986; 2. "Let's Kiss" Released: November __, 1986; 3. "Hold On" Released: February __, 1987

Models' Media is the fifth and final studio album by Australian rock band Models. Singles from the album were "Evolution", "Let's Kiss" and "Hold On".

== Track listing ==
All songs written by J. Freud except where noted, according to Australasian Performing Right Association (APRA).

1. "Evolution" (S. Kelly, J. Freud) - 4:02
2. "Let's Kiss" (S. Kelly) - 3:31
3. "Hold On" (S. Kelly, J. Freud) - 4:27
4. "Beast O' Mine" - 4:01
5. "Shootin' Train" (S. Kelly) - 4:06
6. "Build It Up" - 3:45
7. "Bitter Years" - 3:39
8. "Sky Went Grey" (S. Kelly) - 3:22
9. "I Had a Premonition" (S. Kelly) - 4:36
10. "Ghostworld" - 5:41

== Chart positions ==
Year	Chart	Position
1987	Australian Albums Chart	30
1987	New Zealand Albums (RMNZ)	44

== Personnel ==
=== Musicians ===
- James Freud - bass, vocals
- Sean Kelly - guitar, vocals
- Roger Mason - keyboards, vocals
- Wendy Matthews - vocals
- Barton Price - drums, percussion
- James Valentine - saxophone

=== Production ===
- Paul Clarke - Photography
- Julian Mendelsohn - Engineer
- Mark Opitz - Producer
- Julian Mendelsohn - Producer
