= Alphabravocharliedeltaechofoxtrotgolf =

1980 studio album by various artists

Studio album by Models
- Released: 1980
- Recorded: 1980
- Genre: New wave
- Length: 34:18
- Label: Mushroom

Models chronology
Alphabravocharliedeltaechofoxtrotgolf (1980)	Cut Lunch (1981)

Alphabravocharliedeltaechofoxtrotgolf is the first album by Australian new wave group Models. The title alludes to the first seven letters of the NATO phonetic alphabet. The title also refers to the designations of the natural divisions in the 12-note Western music scale in the key of 'C'. The LP album cover claimed it was produced by no-one, in fact, it was recorded independently by engineer Tony Cohen and the group, prior to signing with Mushroom Records. It was released in November 1980, but no singles were released commercially from the album, although "Two People Per km²" and "Uncontrollable Boy" were on a 12-inch disc released to radio stations, and a music video was made for "Two People Per km²".

The album was re-released on CD in 1990.

== Background ==
Models had formed in Melbourne in 1978 by former members of Teenage Radio Stars and JAB. Following some line-up changes they consolidated into Andrew Duffield on keyboards, Mark Ferrie on bass guitar, Janis Friedenfelds (a.k.a. Johnny Crash) on drums and percussion, and Sean Kelly on vocals and lead guitar. Their first release in October 1979 was a give-away single, "Early Morning Brain (It's Not Quite the Same as Sobriety)" backed with The Boys Next Door's "Scatterbrain". Friction within the band led to their break-up in November, record producers Vanda & Young asked Models to cut some demos - so they reformed at the end of December.

Their second single was another giveaway, "Owe You Nothing," composed of tracks from the Vanda and Young sessions. It appeared in August 1980. In November of that year the Duffield, Ferrie, Friedenfelds and Kelly line-up released Models' first album, Alphabravocharliedeltaechofoxtrotgolf, on Mushroom Records. It peaked at #43 on the Australian albums chart. The album was well received by audiences familiar with the group from the live pub circuit. No singles were released commercially from the album, although "Two People Per km²" and "Uncontrollable Boy" were on a 12-inch disc released to radio stations, and a music video was made for "Two People Per km²". The video was directed by Ray Argall as part of a short film about the group.

The band performed extensively both locally and interstate, supporting the Ramones and Midnight Oil on a national tour.

Early in 1981, Friedenfelds was replaced by Buster Stiggs from New Zealand band The Swingers. In June, Models released a 10" album, Cut Lunch, which consisted of further tracks originally intended as demos, produced by Tony Cohen and Models except one produced by Split Enz keyboard player Eddie Rayner.

== Recording ==
Engineer Tony Cohen said, "Sessions for the album went on for months. Sean had a terrific ear and could create something out of nothing. An absolute genius. Andrew would get the most bizarre sounds out of the keyboards."

== Reception ==
John di Mase in RAM said, "The album is one of my favourites of the year. The spark has been captured on vinyl. The band shows its influences, ska, new wave and electronics. It transcends any one form because of the Models' bold, intrepid approach."

== Track listing ==
All tracks are written by Sean Kelly unless otherwise shown

Alphabravocharliedeltaechofoxtrotgolf
No.	Title	Writer(s)	Length
1.	"21 Hz"" (instrumental)	Andrew Duffield, Mark Ferrie, Janis Friedenfelds, Sean Kelly	0:52
2.	"Strategic Air Command"	Andrew Duffield, Sean Kelly	3:01
3.	"Two People Per km²"		3:12
4.	"Pull the Pin"	Mark Ferrie	2:20
5.	"Twice Removed"		2:55
6.	"Pate Pedestrian"	Andrew Duffield, Mark Ferrie, Janis Friedenfelds, Sean Kelly	3:28
7.	"Kissing Around Corners"	Andrew Duffield, Mark Ferrie	3:29
8.	"All Stop"		3:41
9.	"Uncontrollable Boy (I'm Just An)"	Janis Friedenfelds	2:38
10.	"Young Rodents"		3:38
11.	"Hans Stand: A War Record"	Andrew Duffield, Mark Ferrie, Janis Friedenfelds, Sean Kelly	1:01
12.	"Happy Birthday IBM"	Andrew Duffield	4:00

== Personnel ==
=== Musicians ===
- Sean Kelly – guitar, clarinet, vocals
- Andrew Duffield – keyboards, EMS Synthi AKS
- Mark Ferrie – bass guitar; vocals on "Pull the Pin"
- Janis Freidenfelds (a.k.a. Johnny Crash) – percussion, traps, syncussion

=== Technical Personnel ===
- Producer – no-one; recorded independently by Models with Tony Cohen
- Engineer – Tony Cohen
