= I Hear Motion =

Single by Models

from the album The Pleasure of Your Company
- B-side: "No Talking"
- Released: 20 September 1983
- Recorded: 1983
- Genre: New Wave, Rock
- Length: 4:20
- Label: Mushroom
- Songwriter(s): Models
- Producer(s): Nick Launay

Models singles chronology
"On" (1982)	"I Hear Motion" (1983)	"No Shoulders No Head" (1983)

"I Hear Motion" was the first single from The Pleasure of Your Company, the third studio album by Australian new wave rock band Models.

It was a Top 20 success on the Australian Kent Music Report singles chart, peaking at No. 16 for two weeks, (although it climbed higher in several states and territories, placing at No. 12 on Melbourne's 3XY charts in October 1983).

At the 1983 Countdown Music Awards, the song was nominated for Best Australian Single.

Portions of "I Hear Motion" were included in the soundtrack of the 1988 movie, Young Einstein.

Duffield claimed the genesis for writing the song was an unsuccessful attempt at playing Stevie Wonder's "Superstition" on a keyboard.

== Reception ==
Countdown Magazine said at the time of release, ""I Hear Motion" showcases their new sound. It's sophisticated and slightly jarring, but ultimately wins you over with seductive rhythms that defy you to remain unmoved." The Sun-Herald said, "it's no wonder the first single from the album, "I Hear Motion", with its strong catchy beat, innovative keyboards and suave vocals hit the national charts".

== Track listing ==
Mushroom Records (K-9187)
No.	Title	Writer(s)	Length
1.	"I Hear Motion"	James Freud, Sean Kelly, Andrew Duffield, Barton Price	4:20
2.	"No Talking"	James Freud. Sean Kelly, Andrew Duffield, Barton Price	4:02

12" version
No.	Title	Writer(s)	Length
1.	"I Hear Motion (Extended Mix)"	James Freud. Sean Kelly, Andrew Duffield, Barton Price	6:28
2.	"No Talking"	James Freud. Sean Kelly, Andrew Duffield, Barton Price	4:02
3.	"I Hear Motion (Remix)"	James Freud. Sean Kelly, Andrew Duffield, Barton Price	4:44

I Hear Motion (Boxcar Remixes)
No.	Title	Writer(s)	Length
1.	"I Hear Motion (Mind Over Motion - 7" Edit)"	James Freud. Sean Kelly, Andrew Duffield, Barton Price	4:07
2.	"I Hear Motion (Mind Over Motion - Extended)"	James Freud. Sean Kelly, Andrew Duffield, Barton Price	4:35
3.	"I Hear Motion (Mind Over Motion - Trancemotion)"	James Freud. Sean Kelly, Andrew Duffield, Barton Price	4:34
4.	"I Hear Motion (Mind Over Motion - Drum Dub)"	James Freud. Sean Kelly, Andrew Duffield, Barton Price	3:57
5.	"I Hear Motion (Mind Over Motion - Instrumental)"	James Freud. Sean Kelly, Andrew Duffield, Barton Price	4:35

== Charts ==
=== Weekly charts ===
Weekly chart performance for "I Hear Motion"
Chart (1983)	Peak position
Australia (Kent Music Report)	16

=== Year-end charts ===
Year-end chart performance for "I Hear Motion"
Chart (1983)	Position
Australia (Kent Music Report)	91
