= Lenny Burns =

- Origin: England
- Genres: Punk, rock, country, baroque pop, chanson, burlesque
- Occupation(s): Singer, lyricist
- Years active: 2007–present
- Labels: EMI

Lenny Burns is a British singer and lyricist. Burns's varied style and individuality make him difficult to categorise. Live appearances are characterised by his acerbic sense of humour and tendency for provocation. In his personal life, Burns is a reclusive figure.

== Discography ==
- "Mr Sex", Track 1 on Burlesque: Seriously Good Music (Petrol Records and EMI America Records), Compact Disc, 2007
