= Desperate (Divinyls album) =

Studio album by Divinyls
- Released: January 1983
- Recorded: 1981–1982
- Genre: New wave, pub rock
- Length: 30:38 (Australian release); 33:25 (international release)
- Label: Chrysalis
- Producer: Mark Opitz

Divinyls chronology
Monkey Grip (1982)	Desperate (1983)	What a Life! (1985)

Singles from Desperate
- 1. "Science Fiction" Released: November 1982; 2. "Siren (Never Let You Go)" Released: April 1983; 3. "Casual Encounter" Released: August 1983

Professional ratings
Review scores
Source	Rating
AllMusic	3/5 stars
The Village Voice	A−

Desperate is the debut studio album and second overall album by Australian rock band Divinyls, released in 1983 by Chrysalis Records. The album contains the singles "Science Fiction" and "Siren (Never Let You Go)" and "Casual Encounter". The international version included the single "Boys in Town" from Monkey Grip.

== Background ==
Divinyls formed in 1980, founded by Mark McEntee and fronted by lead singer Chrissy Amphlett. After scoring several gigs, they were discovered by Australian director Ken Cameron. This led to Divinyls providing the entire soundtrack for his film Monkey Grip (1982). Amphlett was also given a supporting role in the film, playing a temperamental rock singer loosely based on herself, fronting a band played by other Divinyls members. In the film, the band performed their debut single "Boys in Town", as well as other songs "Only Lonely", "Elsie", "Only You", "Girlfriends" and "Gonna Get You", the latter being the first appearance of them in the film. The soundtrack Music from Monkey Grip was acknowledged as a Divinyls album, and when released in 1982, it made the top twenty-five of the Australian Albums Chart.

"Boys in Town" was a success in Australia where it made the top ten, peaking at number eight in 1981. The next year, "Science Fiction" was released and was also a success, peaking at number thirteen. When Desperate was released, it climbed the albums chart and eventually peaked at number five. In addition, it proved to be among the top twenty most successful albums of 1983, ranking in at number seventeen according to the Kent Music Report end of year chart.

The track listing of Desperate differed between the Australian release and the international version. Because Divinyls had already released the Monkey Grip soundtrack, which contained the songs performed in the film, in particular the single "Boys in Town", they were not included on the original Australian release of Desperate. This meant that "Science Fiction" was released as the official lead single. On the international release of Desperate, some of the songs from the Monkey Grip soundtrack were included as official album tracks, such as "Boys in Town", "Only Lonely", "Only You" and "Elsie".

The majority of the songs on Desperate were written by Amphlett and/or McEntee except "Siren (Never Let You Go)", which was written by band member Bjarne Ohlin, and "I'll Make You Happy", which was a cover of the original 1966 song by The Easybeats.

Caroline Records announced that a remastered CD version of the international version of Desperate album was released on 5 February 2008. In 2020, Rubellan Remasters released a remastered CD version of Desperate that compiled all the songs from both versions.

"Ring Me Up" was used in the teen comedy film Sixteen Candles (1984).

== Track listings ==
=== Australian release ===
No.	Title	Writer(s)	Length
1.	"I'll Make You Happy"	Stevie Wright, George Young	3:21
2.	"Science Fiction"	Chrissy Amphlett, Mark McEntee	3:32
3.	"Casual Encounter"	Amphlett, McEntee	3:05
4.	"Victoria"	McEntee	3:22
5.	"Siren (Never Let You Go)"	Bjarne Ohlin	2:28
6.	"Motion"	Amphlett, McEntee	3:16
7.	"Ring Me Up"	Amphlett, McEntee	3:07
8.	"Take a Chance"	Amphlett, McEntee	3:23
9.	"Sahara Rock"	Amphlett, McEntee	2:35
10.	"Don't You Go Walking"	McEntee	6:09

=== International release ===
No.	Title	Writer(s)	Length
1.	"Boys in Town"	Chrissy Amphlett, Mark McEntee	2:50
2.	"Only Lonely"	Amphlett, McEntee	3:15
3.	"Science Fiction"	Amphlett, McEntee	3:32
4.	"Siren (Never Let You Go)"	Bjarne Ohlin	2:28
5.	"Elsie"	Amphlett, McEntee	6:42
6.	"Only You"	Amphlett, McEntee	2:48
7.	"Ring Me Up"	Amphlett, McEntee	3:07
8.	"Victoria"	McEntee	3:19
9.	"Take a Chance"	Amphlett, McEntee	3:23
10.	"I'll Make You Happy"	Stevie Wright, George Young	3:21

== Charts ==
=== Weekly charts ===
Chart (1983)	Peak position
Australia (Kent Music Report)	5

=== End of year charts ===
End of Year Chart (1983)	Position
Australia (Kent Music Report)	17

== Certifications ==
Region	Certification	Certified units/sales
Australia (ARIA)	Platinum	100,000^{^}
^{^} Shipments figures based on certification alone.

== Personnel ==
- Chrissy Amphlett – lead vocals
- Mark McEntee – lead and acoustic guitars, backing vocals
- Bjarne Ohlin – keyboards, backing vocals, guitars
- Rick Grossman – bass
- Jeremy Paul – bass
- Richard Harvey – drums

Technical

- Bob Clearmountain – mixer
- Jeff Hendrickson – engineer
- Malcolm Pollack – engineer
- Mark Opitz – producer
