= Melbourne (album) =

Compilation album by Models
- Released: 2001
- Recorded: 1980s
- Length: 65:32
- Label: Shock Records

Models chronology
Models and Friends (1995)	Melbourne (2001)

Melbourne is a compilation album by the Models, recorded in the early 1980s and released in 2001. The album was distributed by Shock Records.

The album was compiled by dedicated Models fan, Mark Burchett (a band booking agent for Premier Artists), who compiled sixteen cuts of the Models' material before they signed with Mushroom Records, consisting of demos, studio cuts and live tracks with the assistance of Melbourne public radio station 3RRRFM. The liner notes for the album are written by Australian Rock historian Ian McFarlane.

== Track listing ==
1. "Body Shop" - 5:37
2. "Current Affair" - 3:30
3. "Whisper Through The Wall" - 3:43
4. "Party Girls" - 4:58
5. "Atlantic Romantic" - 5:09
6. "The Other People Incident" - 5:27
7. "Golden Arches" - 3:59
8. "John From Earth" - 4:32
9. "Brave New World" - 3:46
10. "Early Morning Brain (It's not quite the same as Sobriety)" - 4:26
11. "Progressive Office Pools" - 2:24
12. "Keep It A Secret" - 4:27
13. "Owe You Nothing" - 3:32
14. "Idiots In The Village" - 2:24
15. "All American Club Foot" - 3:31
16. "Elephant Man Elephant Woman" - 4:07
