= Burlesque (compilation album) =

Burlesque: Seriously Good Music

Compilation album by various artists
- Released: July 17, 2007
- Recorded: 2007
- Genre: Burlesque, neo-burlesque, pop music
- Length: 49:40
- Label: Petrol Records; EMI America
- Producer: CM Murphy

Various artists chronology
Bollywood: Seriously Good Music (2007)	Burlesque: Seriously Good Music (2007)	Reggae: Seriously Good Music (2007)

Burlesque: Seriously Good Music is a compilation album of eclectic and quirky contemporary burlesque and neo-burlesque performers from around the world, released in 2007. It was assembled by CM Murphy, manager of INXS and founder of Petrol Records. The album was released on compact disc by Petrol and EMI America Records with liner notes by Deborah Niski.

== Track listing ==
1. Lenny Burns: "Mr Sex"
2. I Monster: "No Nice Strippers"
3. In Flagranti: "Genital Blow Room"
4. Monsieur Blumenberg: "Seherezade Mon Amour"
5. Oleg Kostrow, SuperSonic Future: "In Three Hands (V Tri Ruki)"
6. Barth: "Picton Du Bocage"
7. Professor Angel Dust: "Lonely Souljah"
8. Julien Ribot: "Nue Sur Le Sofa"
9. Her Majesty's Sound: "I Am A Lady"
10. Francois Elie Roulin: "Parade"
11. Orient Expressions: "Lodos"
12. Olaf Hund: "Incompletude"

== The Seriously Good Music series ==
In 2006–2007, Petrol Records released a series of eleven albums in the Seriously Good Music series. Each album focuses on a specific genre or subgenre: Bollywood, bossa nova, burlesque, Celtic music, cocktail, Gypsy music, Latin music, lounge music, reggae, salsa music (and a second salsa album). The Burlesque collection is generally regarded as the best in the series.

== See also ==
- Teaserama—1950s burlesque film compilation of strippers (notably Bettie Page and Tempest Storm) and comedians (including Joe E. Ross a.k.a. Rupert Ritzik in The Phil Silvers Show), influence on burlesque performers
- Honey Harlow—stripper and showgirl, best remembered as Mrs. Lenny Bruce, influence on burlesque performers
- "These Boots Are Made for Walkin'"—1966 song written by Lee Hazlewood and recorded by Nancy Sinatra, influence on neo-burlesque musicians
- Beyond the Valley of the Dolls—1970s cult film directed by Russ Meyer with music composed mostly by Stu Phillips, influence on neo-burlesque musicians
- Carry On film series—long-running series of low-budget British comedy films, influence on British neo-burlesque performers
