= Models (band) =

Australian rock band

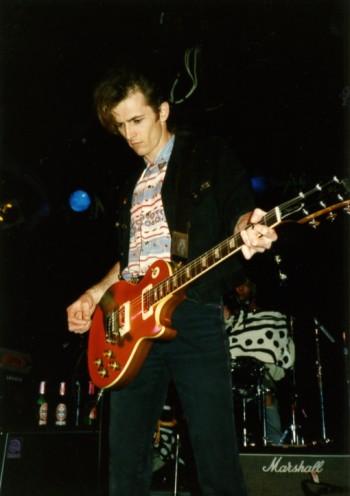
- Sean Kelly of Models onstage at Wolfgang's nightclub, San Francisco, California – 1986

Background information
- Origin: Melbourne, Victoria, Australia
- Genres: Post-punk, new wave
- Years active: 1978–1988, 2000–2001, 2006, 2008, 2010–present
- Labels: Mushroom; Festival; A&M; Geffen; Champignon; Shock
- Members: Sean Kelly; Andrew Duffield; Mark Ferrie; Ash Davies
- Past members: See members list below
- Website: https://modelsband.com

Models (also sometimes known as The Models) are an Australian rock band formed in Melbourne, Victoria, in August 1978. They went into hiatus in 1988, but re-formed in 2000, 2006 and 2008 to perform reunion concerts. The band began regularly performing again from 2010 onwards. "Out of Mind, Out of Sight", their only No. 1 hit, appeared on the Australian singles charts in July 1985. The related album, Out of Mind, Out of Sight, peaked at No. 3 on the Australian albums charts after its release in August. Out of Mind, Out of Sight appeared on the Billboard 200 albums chart, with the single, "Out of Mind, Out of Sight", peaking at No. 37 on the Billboard Hot 100 singles chart. An earlier song from the same album, "Barbados", had peaked at No. 2 on the Australian singles chart.

Models' early line-up included Andrew Duffield on keyboards, Mark Ferrie on bass guitar, Janis Freidenfelds (a.k.a. Johnny Crash) on drums and percussion, and Sean Kelly on vocals and lead guitar. A later line-up was mainstay Kelly on guitar, James Freud on vocals and bass, Roger Mason on keyboards, Barton Price on drums, and James Valentine on saxophone. Backing singers in the group included Zan Abeyratne and Kate Ceberano (both from I'm Talking) and Canadian-born Wendy Matthews. In early 1989, Duffield, Kelly, Matthews and Valentine were members of Absent Friends. On 27 October 2010, Models were inducted into the ARIA Hall of Fame by Matthews.

== History ==
=== 1977–1979: Early years ===
In 1977 Melbourne school friends Sean Kelly and James Freud formed their first band, Spread, which was soon renamed Teenage Radio Stars. They recorded two tracks for Suicide records' Lethal Weapons compilation album (1978) as well as a single, 'Wanna Be Ya Baby'.

Singer and guitarist Sean Kelly left in 1978 to form Models with bass guitarist Peter Sutcliffe (a.k.a. Pierre Voltaire and Pierre Sutcliffe, who won $503,000 in May 2014, on Australian TV quiz show Million Dollar Minute) and Ash Wednesday (formerly of JAB on keyboards, and Janis Friedenfelds (a.k.a. Johnny Crash) on drums and percussion. Models were more pop influenced than the earlier punk bands and had a wider appeal. The initial version of the group did not stay together for long as, after six months, Sutcliffe was replaced on bass by Mark Ferrie (ex-Myriad). In August 1979, Wednesday was replaced by Andrew Duffield from Whirlywirld on keyboards. The line-up of the band with Ferrie and Wednesday recorded demos which make up eight tracks of the 2001 album Melbourne. Their first release in October 1979 was a give-away, split single, "Early Morning Brain (It's Not Quite the Same as Sobriety)" backed with The Boys Next Door's "Scatterbrain". Friction within the band led to their decision to break up in November 1978. However they reformed at the end of December when ex-The Easybeats members, Harry Vanda and George Young, who were now record producers and songwriters, offered to cut some demos for them – Their second single, "Owe You Nothing" appeared in August 1980. Both singles were released independently and did not chart on the Top 40 Australian singles chart according to the Kent Music Report.

=== 1980–1982: Alphabravocharliedeltaechofoxtrotgolf to Local and/or General ===
Models performed extensively both locally and interstate, supporting the Ramones, The B-52's, XTC, The Vapors and Midnight Oil on national tours. Although they attracted significant record label interest, the group financed the recording of their first album Alphabravocharliedeltaechofoxtrotgolf. to guarantee creative control. Under manager Adrian Barker, they signed to Mushroom Records which released the album and, as a sign of its respect for the band, agreed not to release any singles from the album, which peaked at No. 43 on the Australian Kent Music Report Albums Chart. The group intended to record completely new material for their studio albums. Much of their earlier work was unreleased until 2002, when Models Melbourne, a compilation album of live and demo recordings, was released.

Models' early style was a spiky, distinctive blend of new wave, glam rock, dub and pop: it included Kelly's strangled singing voice, Duffield's virtuoso synthesiser performances (he used the EMS Synthi AKS), and the band's cryptic, slightly gruesome, lyrics (e.g., "Hans Stand: A War Record" from Alphabravocharliedeltaechofoxtrotgolf), which were mostly written or co-written by Kelly.

Early in 1981, following a support slot for The Police, the group signed an international deal with A&M Records. Friedenfelds was replaced on drums by Mark Hough (a.k.a. Buster Stiggs) from New Zealand band The Swingers before recording commenced on their international label release. Friedenfields went on to play with Sacred Cowboys, Beasts of Bourbon, The Slaughterman and Tombstone Hands. The band went to England to record with producer, Stephen Tayler producing. at Farmyard Studios, these tracks becoming the album Local and/or General.

In June, demo sessions recorded earlier in Australia so impressed the band that they were released as a 10" mini album, Cut Lunch (July 1981), which was produced by Tony Cohen and Models except one track produced by Split Enz keyboard player Eddie Rayner. Cut Lunch peaked at No. 37 on the albums chart and at No. 38 on the singles chart. It included the whimsical pop tune, "Two Cabs to the Toucan".

In October, their second full-length album Local &/or General, was released. Local and/or General peaked at No. 30 and provided the single, "Local &/or General" in November, which did not chart.

Both albums helped widen their audience nationally, thanks to regular radio exposure on Triple J in Sydney and on community stations in other cities, as well as national TV exposure through their innovative music videos on programs such as the Australian Broadcasting Corporation (ABC-TV) pop music show Countdown.

During 1982, further line-up changes occurred with Ferrie and Hough leaving early in the year. Ferrie went on to form Sacred Cowboys with Garry Gray and Terry Doolan. He later (as of November 2010) became bass player in the RocKwiz house band on SBS TV. Hough became a graphic artist, art director and designer. James Freud (ex-Teenage Radio Stars, James Freud & Berlin) joined the band on bass and vocals, with John Rowell on guitar and Graham Scott on drums (both ex-Curse). Kelly and Freud had been in high school bands which developed into Teenage Radio Stars. As part of James Freud and the Radio Stars, Freud had released a single, "Modern Girl", which peaked at No. 12 in 1980. Rowell and Scott left Models in May 1982, with Duffield following. New Zealand drummer, Barton Price (ex-Crocodiles, Sardine v) joined. They recorded a single, "On", produced by veteran rocker, Lobby Loyde, and released in August. It had no mainstream chart success, but peaked at No. 1 on the independent charts. Gus Till (ex-Beargarden) briefly joined on keyboards until Duffield rejoined in December. A 1982 film, Pop Movie, which featured animation and live footage of the Alphabravocharliedeltaechofoxtrotgolf era of the band, was screened on TV rock show, Nightmoves, as well as at a few cinemas.

=== 1983–1985: The Pleasure of Your Company to Out of Mind, Out of Sight ===
Models' line-up of Duffield, Freud, Kelly and Price issued the highly regarded The Pleasure of Your Company in October 1983, produced by Nick Launay. Its big drum sound and dance-ability reflected Launay's influence, and Freud's more radio-friendly voice made the album more accessible than previous releases. The album was critically acclaimed and peaked at No. 12, with the single "I Hear Motion" becoming a No. 16 hit. Duffield later explained that the song's distinctive keyboard part had been inspired by a riff from Stevie Wonder's hit "Superstition". "I Hear Motion" was used on the soundtrack for the Yahoo Serious film Young Einstein (1988). The band released two other singles, "God Bless America" and "No Shoulders, No Head", but neither charted in the Top 50. The band supported David Bowie for the Australian leg of his Serious Moonlight Tour in November. Kelly and Duffield were invited to sing backing vocals on the INXS album, The Swing. The video for "God Bless America", from March 1984, featured backing singers Zan Abeyratne and Kate Ceberano (both members of I'm Talking). Kelly appeared ready to disband Models and was even rehearsing with a new band. Mushroom Records convinced him to continue with Models and their next single, "Big on Love" produced by Reggie Lucas, was released in November 1984 and peaked at No. 24.

Fellow Australian band INXS were fans of Models; their manager, Chris Murphy signed them to his MMA management company. The group created a hybrid of their alternative roots with a more commercial sound and, under the influence of Murphy, they reassessed their direction and moved towards a more radio-friendly format. By late 1984, Models relocated to Sydney and Duffield – with his crucial influence on the band's sound – was forced out by Murphy under acrimonious circumstances to be replaced by Roger Mason (ex-James Freud's Berlin) on keyboards and James Valentine on saxophone. Duffield released a solo album, Ten Happy Fingers in 1986 on his own Retrograde Records label. For touring during 1983 to 1985, the group was regularly augmented by backing singers Abeyratne and Ceberano; and in 1985, Canadian-born singer Wendy Matthews joined. Matthews and Kelly became a couple, remaining together for 11 years, and later founded the band Absent Friends.

In early 1985, Models started recording material for their next album, Out of Mind, Out of Sight, produced by Launay, Lucas and Mark Opitz. A single from the album, "Barbados", was released in March, and peaked at No. 2. It was a reggae influenced song co-written by Freud and Duffield (prior to his departure). The song related a tale of alcoholism and suicide, it later provided Freud with the titles of his two autobiographies, I Am the Voice Left from Drinking (2002) and I Am the Voice Left from Rehab (2007). The video clip was influenced by the film, The Deer Hunter, it included a cameo by Garry Gary Beers of INXS and was directed by Richard Lowenstein.

On 13 July, Models performed four songs for the Oz for Africa concert (part of the global Live Aid program) – "Big on Love", "I Hear Motion", "Stormy Tonight", "Out of Mind, Out of Sight". It was broadcast in Australia (on both Seven Network and Nine Network) and on MTV in the United States. Models went on a national tour with I'm Talking in July. In November, the band appeared on The Royal Variety Performance for Prince Charles and Princess Diana – Rocking the Royals at the Victoria State Arts Centre. The band released their most commercially successful work with the No. 1 hit single "Out of Mind, Out of Sight" in June and the No. 3 album Out of Mind, Out of Sight in August. "Out of Mind, Out of Sight" was the only No. 1 single on the Australian singles chart for 1985 by an Australian artist. (Midnight Oil's Species Deceases which peaked at No. 1 on the singles charts in December 1985 was an EP.) For the album, Models were Freud, Kelly, Mason, Matthews, Price and Valentine with Zan Abeyratne, and her twin sister, Sherine Abeyratne (Big Pig) on backing vocals.

"Cold Fever" released in October was their next single, which appeared momentarily in the Top 40. It was followed by a Christmas single, "King of Kings", which contains portions of a speech by Martin Luther King Jr., issued in December with all proceeds donated to the Salvation Army, but it did not chart in the Top 50. In 1986, Geffen Records released Out of Mind, Out of Sight in the US and it appeared on the Billboard 200 albums chart, with the single, "Out of Sight, Out of Mind", peaking at No. 37 on the Billboard Hot 100 singles chart. The band toured the US in November supporting Orchestral Manoeuvres in the Dark.

=== 1986–1988: Models' Media to dissolution ===
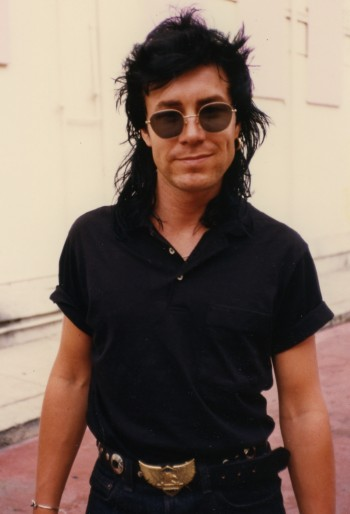
James Freud of Models outside The Roxy in West Hollywood, California, 1986

In 1986, Models went to UK to record their next album, Models' Media, with Julian Mendelsohn and Opitz, at Trevor Horn's state-of-the-art SARM West Studios in London. Two singles entered the Top 30, "Evolution" in September, and "Let's Kiss" in November. Models' Media was released in December and peaked at No. 30 making it less commercially successful than Out of Mind, Out of Sight. Models also featured on the Australian Made Tour of late 1986 to January 1987 with INXS, Mental as Anything, The Triffids, I'm Talking, The Saints, Divinyls and Jimmy Barnes on the ticket. "Hold On" was released in March 1987 and peaked in the Top 30, their final single was a cover of The Beatles' "Oh! Darling" in September which peaked in the Top 50.

During 1987, Ceberano and Matthews sang together on the soundtrack for ABC-TV series, Stringer, the resultant album, You've Always Got the Blues was released in 1988, and peaked at No. 4 on the albums chart. Models members, including Mason as lead singer and Kelly on bass guitar, formed a side-project, The Clampetts, to support Models on tour; the group recorded a live album of nine country music covers, released in 1987 as The Last Hoedown - Live! (Warts N'All). Valentine left Models to pursue a radio and television journalism career.

In 1988, the Thank You Goodnight Tour was conducted but the pressures of ten years of touring, as well as financial troubles, hastened the break-up of Models, which was announced in June 1988, however in 2008, Kelly disputed the break-up:

I remember in the late '80s I noticed James' [Freud] Record Company put out a press release that we'd split up, which was completely inaccurate. Because we had so many individuals in the group, we've always been able to sustain it in one form or another - and fortunately for me they've always let me be involved. As long as I'm there, we get to claim that continuity.

=== 1988–current: post-dissolution and reunions ===
Models' extended live exposure ensured that they stayed in the public eye when other contemporaries had been forgotten: the band's later work remained popular on radio throughout the 1990s; this, coupled with critical acclaim and cult appeal of earlier work, re-stimulated interest in their work in the latter half of that decade. The band reformed for a few gigs in 2000; in 2001 their rarities album Melbourne was released. Freud has written two memoirs, I Am The Voice Left From Drinking (2002) and I Am The Voice Left From Rehab (2007); the titles are both taken from "Barbados" and allude to his addiction with drugs and alcohol, and his subsequent recovery attempts.

Kelly and Matthews formed Absent Friends in early 1989 which included ex-Models members Duffield, Mason and Valentine. With Matthews on lead vocals their 1990 hit single, "I Don’t Want to Be with Nobody but You" peaked at No. 4 on the ARIA Charts. The associated album, Here's Looking Up Your Address peaked at No. 7. Absent Friends disbanded in 1991 and Kelly fronted The Dukes from 1991 to 1994. Matthews provided a No. 11 hit with her first solo album Émigré late in 1990. She followed with Lily, which peaked at No. 2 in 1992, and provided her best performed single, "The Day You Went Away", which also peaked at No. 2. Former drummer Scott was a member of Satellite (1993–1997). Matthews and Kelly separated as a couple in the mid-1990s.

Duffield wrote music (including the theme) for the Australian children's TV series, Round the Twist; and in 2007 composed all music and sound effects for the TV comedy, Kick. Duffield teamed up with Phil Kennihan to found a successful advertising music partnership.

Mason has composed soundtracks for many feature films and television series both locally and internationally. Valentine later worked in children's TV, is a popular radio host on 702 ABC Sydney and published a successful series of children's books. Price returned to New Zealand after stints with various Australian bands, and the world's first drum sample CD. Wednesday formed Crashland and plays with German avant garde band Einstürzende Neubauten.

Various versions of Models have reformed on several occasions for short tours, including in 2006 and in September 2008. The 2008 version was: Kelly, Freud, his son Jackson Freud (from Attack of the Mannequins) on guitar, Tim Rosewarne (ex-Big Pig, Chocolate Starfish) on keyboards and Cameron Goold (Propaganda Klann, Christine Anu backing band) on drums. In August 2010, Duffield, Ferrie, Kelly and Price reformed for two concerts in Sydney and Melbourne. On 27 October, Models were inducted into the ARIA Hall of Fame by Matthews. The line-up of Duffield, Ferrie, Kelly, Mason, Price and Valentine performed "I Hear Motion" and "Evolution". At this event, Matthews recalled meeting the group for the first time at a recording session – she was due to provide backing vocals, but they were busy playing indoor cricket in the studio. During the ceremony, Kelly explained Freud's absence by saying he had "another bicycle accident". A week later, Freud was found dead at his Hawthorn home on 4 November in a suspected suicide.

In 2013, Models (consisting of Duffield, Ferrie, Kelly, and Price) issued a self-released four-song EP titled GTK. A follow-up EP was issued in 2015: titled Memo, it also consisted of four songs.

== Members ==
Current members

- Sean Kelly – lead vocals, guitar, clarinet (1978–1988, 2000–2001, 2006, 2008, 2010–present)
- Mark Ferrie – bass guitar (1979–1982, 2001, 2010–present), backing vocals and occasional lead vocals (1979–1982, 2010–present)
- Andrew Duffield – keyboards, backing vocals (1979–1982, 1982–1984, 2010–present), occasional lead vocals (2010–present)
- Ash Davies – drums (2015–present)

Former members

- Janis Freidenfelds a.k.a. Johnny Crash – drums, percussion (1978–1981; died 2014)
- Peter Sutcliffe a.k.a. Pierre Voltaire – bass guitar (1978–1979)
- Ash Wednesday – keyboards (1978–1979, 2001)
- Mark Hough a.k.a. Buster Stiggs – drums (1981–1982; died 2018)
- James Freud – bass guitar, lead and backing vocals (1982–1988, 2000–2001, 2006, 2008; died 2010)
- John Rowell – guitar (1982)
- Graham Scott – drums (1982)
- Barton Price – drums (1982–1988, 2000, 2010–2015)
- Gus Till – keyboards (1982)
- James Valentine – saxophone (1984–1987; died 2026)
- Roger Mason – keyboards, backing vocals (1984–1988, 2000)
- Kate Ceberano – backing vocals (1983–1985)
- Zan Abeyratne – backing vocals (1983–1985)
- Sherine Abeyratne – backing vocals (1983–1985)
- Wendy Matthews – backing vocals (1985–1988)
- Jackson Freud – guitar (2008)
- Tim Rosewarne – keyboards (2008)
- Cameron Goold – drums (2008)

== Discography ==
=== Studio albums ===
Year	Album details	Peak chart positions		
Year	Album details	AUS	NZL	US
1980	Alphabravocharliedeltaechofoxtrotgolf: Released: November 1980; Label: Mushroom Records (L37495); Formats: CD, LP	43	—	—
1981	Local &/or General: Released: October 1981; Label: Mushroom (L37637); Formats: CD, cassette, LP	30	—	—
1983	The Pleasure of Your Company: Released: October 1983; Label: Mushroom (L38065); Formats: CD, cassette, LP	12	—	—
1985	Out of Mind, Out of Sight: Released: September 1985; Label: Mushroom (MUSH32239.2); Formats: CD, cassette, LP	3	8	84
1986	Models' Media: Released: October 1986; Label: Mushroom (RML 53216); Formats: CD, cassette, LP	30	44	—
"—" denotes releases that did not chart or were not released in that territory.

=== Compilation albums ===
Year	Album details
1993	Models' Collection: Released: November 1993; Label: Mushroom Records (MUSH32244.2); Formats: CD, cassette
1995	Models and Friends: Released: October 1995; Label: Champignon (D97022); Formats: CD, cassette
2001	Melbourne: Released: 2001; Label: Shock Records (EMU7982); Formats: CD
2010	The Essential Hits: Released: 13 August 2010; Label: Warner Music Australia (5249808182); Formats: CD, cassette

=== Extended plays ===
Year	EP details	Chart peak positions
Year	EP details	AUS
1980	Two People Per km^{2}: Released: November 1980; Label: independent (radio promotional release); Formats: EP	—
1981	Cut Lunch: Released: June 1981; Label: Mushroom Records (L20001); Formats: EP, mini-CD, mini-cassette	37
2013	GTK: Released: December 2013; Label: independent Gig only release; Formats: CD	—
2015	Memo: Released: June 2015; Label: independent; Formats: CD	—
"—" denotes releases that did not chart.

=== Singles ===
Year	Title	Peak chart positions				Album
Year	Title	AUS	NZL	US	US Main.	Album
1979	"Early Morning Brain (It's Not Quite the Same as Sobriety)"^{[A]}	—	—	—	—	Non-album single
1980	"Owe You Nothing"	—	—	—	—	Non-album single
1981	"Cut Lunch"^{[B]}	38	—	—	—	Cut Lunch (EP)
1981	"Local &/or General"	—	—	—	—	Local &/or General
1982	"Unhappy"	—	—	—	—	Local &/or General
1982	"On"	—	—	—	—	Non-album single
1983	"I Hear Motion"	16	—	—	—	The Pleasure of Your Company
1983	"No Shoulders No Head"	—	—	—	—	The Pleasure of Your Company
1984	"God Bless America"	96	—	—	—	The Pleasure of Your Company
1984	"Tropic of Cancer"	—	—	—	—	Non-album single
1984	"Big on Love"	24	—	—	—	Out of Mind, Out of Sight
1985	"Barbados"	2	32	—	—	Out of Mind, Out of Sight
1985	"Out of Mind, Out of Sight"	1	3	37	22	Out of Mind, Out of Sight
1985	"Cold Fever"	36	22	—	29	Out of Mind, Out of Sight
1985	"King of Kings"	96	—	—	—	Out of Mind, Out of Sight
1986	"Evolution"	21	—	—	—	Models' Media
1986	"Let's Kiss"	27	31	—	—	Models' Media
1987	"Hold On"	21	—	—	—	Models' Media
1987	"Oh! Darling"	48	—	—	—	Non-album single
"—" denotes a recording that did not chart or was not released in that territory.

== Notes ==
A."Early Morning Brain (It's Not Quite the Same as Sobriety)" was originally released by Models as a shared single with The Boys Next Door's "Scatterbrain" on the flip-side.
B.Cut Lunch (EP) charted on the Kent Music Report Albums Chart, with "Cut Lunch" and "Two Cabs to the Toucan" as the most played radio tunes. "Cut Lunch" also peaked on the related Singles Chart.

== Awards and nominations ==
=== ARIA Music Awards ===
The ARIA Music Awards is an annual awards ceremony that recognises excellence, innovation, and achievement across all genres of Australian music. They commenced in 1987. Models were inducted into the Hall of Fame in 2010.

Year	Nominee / work	Award	Result
1987	Mark Opitz for Models Media by Models	Producer of the Year	Won
1987	Richard Alan for Models Media by Models	Best Cover Art	Nominated
2010	Models	ARIA Hall of Fame	inductee

=== Countdown Music Awards ===
Countdown was an Australian pop music TV series on national broadcaster ABC-TV from 1974 to 1987, it presented music awards from 1979 to 1987, initially in conjunction with magazine TV Week. The TV Week / Countdown Awards were a combination of popular-voted and peer-voted awards.

Year	Nominee / work	Award	Result
1983	The Pleasure of Your Company	Best Australian Album	Nominated
1983	"I Hear Motion"	Best Single	Nominated
1984	"Big On Love"	Best Group Performance in a Video	Nominated
1985	"Out of Mind, Out of Sight"	Best Single	Won
