= Andrew Duffield =

Australian musician (born 1958)

- Born: Andrew Peter Duffield; 9 February 1958 (age 68); Melbourne, Victoria, Australia
- Genres: Electronic, alternative rock
- Occupations: Musician, producer, teacher
- Instruments: Keyboards, electronics, EMS Synthi AKS
- Years active: 1978–present
- Label: Retrograde
- Website: duffield.com.au

Andrew Peter Duffield (born 9 February 1958) is an Australian musician, producer and teacher. He has been a member, on keyboards, synthesisers or electronics, for various groups, including Whirlywirld, Models, and Absent Friends. Duffield has also been a backing musician for other artists both on tours and for studio sessions.

== Early life and education ==
Andrew Peter Duffield was born 9 February 1958 in Melbourne, Australia.

He studied electronic music with Felix Werder, classical music composer and critic, in Melbourne.

== Career ==
In June 1978 Duffield played synthesiser for The Boys Next Door's debut album, Door, Door (1979). In August 1978 Duffield on electronics, was a founding member of Whirlywirld with John Murphy on drums and electronics (ex-News); Ian "Ollie" Olsen on lead vocals, electronics, and saxophone (The Reals, The Young Charlatans); Dean Richards on guitar; and Simon Smith on electronics. This line-up issued a three-track self-titled extended play in April the following year. However, in January, Duffield had been replaced in Whirlywirld by Philip Jackson.

Early in 1979 Duffield joined Bohdan and The Instigators alongside Bohdan X (aka Bohdan Kubiakowski) on lead vocals and guitar; together with ex-The Chosen Few bandmates: Iain Weaver on lead vocals; Bruce Friday on lead guitar; Cal McAlpine on drums; and Ian Cunningham on bass guitar. Also that year Duffield scored music and provided arrangements for Film Work, a movie which compiled excerpts from four documentaries originally made by Waterside Workers Federation Film Unit between 1953 and 1958; and interviews with its members. By August Duffield had joined Models and Bohdan and The Instigators soon disbanded.

The Models formed in 1978. By the time Duffield joined on keyboards, the other members were Mark Ferrie on bass guitar; Janis Friedenfelds (aka Johnny Crash) on drums and percussion; and Sean Kelly on lead vocals and lead guitar. In October 1979 Models first release was a give-away, shared single, "Early Morning Brain (It's Not Quite the Same as Sobriety)" backed with The Boys Next Door's "Scatterbrain". In July 1980 Models line-up of Duffield with Crash, Ferrie, and Kelly, supported a gig by Ramones in Canberra.

Besides keyboards, including EMS Synthi AKS, Duffield also provided songwriting for six tracks on Models' debut album, Alphabravocharliedeltaechofoxtrotgolf (November 1980). The Canberra Times' Jonathan Green praised Duffields' "swelling, ricocheting keyboards". The group's second album, Local and/or General, appeared in October 1981 with Duffield co-writing five tracks. In May the following year Duffield quit Models but by December he had rejoined. During his absence from the group he scored the soundtrack for the 1982 Ian Pringle feature film, The Plains of Heaven (aka Panic Station). He appeared on Models' next album, The Pleasure of Your Company (October 1983), co-writing all ten tracks.

By late 1984, Models relocated to Sydney. They performed at a 1985 New Year's Day early morning gig with a line-up of Duffield, Kelly, James Freud (ex-Teenage Radio Stars, James Freud & Berlin) on bass guitar and vocals; Barton Price (ex-Crocodiles, Sardine v) on drums; and James Valentine on saxophone. Rachael Warren of The Canberra Times caught the show and felt "[a]nother interesting song of the night was Andrew Duffield's 'Beyond Rap'. He said how unhappy he is, that happiness is a bore, and you can forget all the 'Real Lifes' and 'Pseudo Echos'".

However, despite Duffield's crucial influence on the band's sound, he was forced out of Models by their recently appointed manager, Chris Murphy (INXS), under acrimonious circumstances: Murphy wanted the group to have a more commercial pop sound but Duffield felt this would be a "sell-out". He was replaced by Roger Mason (ex-James Freud & Berlin) on keyboards. Duffield had already co-written "Barbados" with Freud, which was issued in March 1985 as Models' second single from their next album, Out of Mind, Out of Sight, which appeared in August.

During 1985 Duffield and Phil Kenihan produced a three-track extended play, Over the Ropes – A Tribute to Jack Little by The Forearm Jolt, which used a compilation of commentaries by GTV 9 presenters, Jack Little and Paul Jennings, from their program, World Championship Wrestling. Little's catchphrases included "Wham! Bam! Thank you Mam!", "All I can say is – Wow!", "Be There!" and "That's all there is, there isn't any more!"

The EP was released as a tribute to the ailing Little, who died in early January the following year. The Forearm Jolt were a studio ensemble with Duffield on keyboards; Ferrie on bass guitar; Valentine on saxophone; twins sisters Sherine and Zan Abeyratne on vocals; Rozzi Bazzani on vocals; John Fielding on trumpet; Noel Crombie on thumps and bumps; and Andrew Pendlebury on lead guitar. Lyrics were co-written by Duffield, Kenihan and James Cockington.

In 1988 Duffield released his debut solo album, Ten Happy Fingers on his own Retrograde Records label. It was produced by Duffield and Kenihan, all nine tracks were written by Duffield. In the studio Duffield used a variety of musicians including Ferrie on gated bass guitar; Pendlebury on guitar and loops; Maurice Frawley on guitar; Gordon Pitts on Fairlight brass sound; Ron Strykert on guitar; and Wilbur Wilde on saxophone. Duffield wrote the theme song for the television series, Round the Twist. Lead vocals for "Round the Twist" were sung by Tamsin West, who portrayed one of the main characters, Linda Twist, in series 1 (1989). He also composed the music for series 1 and 2 (1992).

In May 1989 Duffield, on keyboards, joined Absent Friends, with former Models bandmates: Kelly on vocals and guitar; and Valentine on saxophone; they were joined by Wendy Matthews on lead vocals (latter day member of Models and Kelly's then-domestic partner); Nicole Ainslie on keyboards and backing vocals; Garry Gary Beers on bass guitar (on loan from INXS); Michael King (ex-Jimmy Barnes Band) on guitar; and John MacKay (Machinations) on drums.

By mid-December Absent Friends issued their debut single, "Hallelujah", which Canberra Times' Penelope Layland dismissed as "could quite easily have remained a figment of someone's imagination. It sounds as though they all had fun making it, but that's about it. The flip is a different mix of the same song". Absent Friends' debut album, Here's Looking Up Your Address, followed in April the next year and peaked at No. 7 on the ARIA Albums Chart. By late 1990 the group toured Europe supporting INXS but Duffield had been replaced by Geoffrey Stapleton (GANGgajang on hiatus) on keyboards.

Duffield and Kenihan continued their work as a production duo and expanded into TV advertising. Duffield participated in subsequent reformations of Models including in August 2010 for two concerts in Sydney and Melbourne. On 27 October that year, Models were inducted into the ARIA Hall of Fame by Matthews. The line-up of Duffield, Ferrie, Kelly, Mason, Price and Valentine performed "I Hear Motion" and "Evolution".

== Discography ==
=== Albums ===
List of albums, with selected details
Title	Details
Ten Happy Fingers	Released: 1986; Format: LP, CS; Label: Retrograde Records (RETRO001)
