= Nick Launay =

English record producer (born 1960)

- Born: Nicolas Launay; 5 March 1960 (age 66); London, England
- Genres: Rock; post-punk
- Occupations: Record producer; composer; recording engineer
- Years active: 1978–present

Nicolas Launay (born 5 March 1960) is an English record producer, composer and recording engineer, currently residing in Los Angeles, California. He has produced albums by Nick Cave and the Bad Seeds, Anna Calvi, Idles, Blue October, Black Rebel Motorcycle Club, Yeah Yeah Yeahs and Arcade Fire. Noted for his flamboyant style, he is among the most successful producers of the post-punk era, helming records from pivotal acts including Public Image Ltd, Gang of Four, Killing Joke, The Birthday Party, and The Slits.

Launay is known primarily for his passionate approach to recording with emphasis on raw sounds and capturing mood. Some of the artists he has worked with include: Kate Bush, Talking Heads, David Byrne, INXS, Models, Midnight Oil, Grinderman, Lou Reed, The Veils, Anna Calvi, Supergrass, The Living End, Band of Skulls, Silverchair and IDLES. He lives in Hollywood, United States and travels to London frequently. More recent work includes producing Yeah Yeah Yeahs' Mosquito, It's Blitz!, mixing Arcade Fire's Neon Bible and The Suburbs, producing and recording Nick Cave and the Bad Seeds' Push the Sky Away, Skeleton Tree along with Grinderman and Grinderman 2, We Mean It, Man! by Gogol Bordello, and Cartoon Darkness by Amyl and the Sniffers.

He is also known for setting trends by finding lesser known recording studios in the world and making them popular. In 2012, he encouraged Nick Cave and the Bad Seeds to record what became the Push the Sky Away album at a little-known studio in France called La Fabrique. At the time, no foreign band had worked there. Since then Morrissey, Radiohead, and Foals have all followed suit. Similarly with La Frette studios he produced Skeleton Tree and then recommended it to Arctic Monkeys via Domino Recording Company owner Laurence Bell. Alex Turner now records all his projects there, and others have followed.

== Biography ==
=== Background ===
The son of French author André Launay and fashion model Eve Launay, he was born in London, England and moved with his family to the village of Frigiliana in Spain at age eight, where his parents adopted a bohemian lifestyle. The family returned to England in 1976, where Launay developed a love of punk rock.

=== Career ===
In 1978, he began working at Tape One studios on Tottenham Court Road, where he was trained to edit hit songs for K-tel Top 20 compilation albums, reducing their length to 2½ minutes in order to fit 20 songs on one album. He recalled: "The trick was to keep all the good bits that people would recognize."

According to his website, Launay was late at work one night "frantically editing and reconstructing an experimental version of "Pop Muzik" by UK pop band M, for his own amusement, when he was visited by respected mastering engineer Denis Blackham." Blackham was so impressed with the new extended version, he played it the next day to M's Robin Scott. Launay says his version was released as a 12-inch single and became a Top 10 hit in the UK and other countries.

In 1980, Launay moved to Virgin Records' Townhouse studios, where he worked as an assistant engineer on albums including The Jam’s Sound Affects and XTC's Black Sea, assisting producers John Leckie, Tony Visconti, Steve Lillywhite and Hugh Padgham.

In 1981, as the most junior member assistant engineer, he was conscripted to work on a Public Image Ltd recording session for a single, "Home is Where the Heart is". In a PiL fan site interview Launay recalled:

None of the other assistant engineers at the Townhouse wanted to work with PiL because of John's reputation for throwing up, walking all over the mixing console, and being verbally abusive. The session started very slow because the engineer/producer they had chosen wasn't very familiar with the then very new and experimental SSL mixing console. This meant I had to keep showing him which button did what. Back then an assistant engineer's place was to stay very quiet, at the back of the room, operating the analogue tape machines. John sat in a big arm chair with two crates of Red Stripe, the Jamaican Beer, one on each side, and watched with amusement at me going back and forth trying my best to help the engineer out. John wanted a triplet delay on a particular vocal line, and the engineer didn't seem to understand what he meant. I was really into Dub Reggae at the time, so I set it up and it worked well. Later the engineer got up and left the room to have a piss. John got up and locked the door behind him. When he came back he started thumping on the door shouting, "Let me in..." John told him to fuck off.

Days later Launay was told PiL wanted him to mix a new song they had worked on. He was asked by the Townhouse manager whether he had done a mix before. "I remember lying and saying, Yes of course I have," he said. "She told me I would have to work alone, as no other assistant would do it. Once again I couldn't believe my luck."

Launay co-produced the band's The Flowers of Romance album (1981), which brought praise for its sonic oddities and prompted other bands including Killing Joke, The Slits, The Birthday Party and Gang of Four to collaborate with him in the studio.

He worked for two months as engineer on Kate Bush’s self-produced The Dreaming (1982), about which he remembers:

She had all these wild ideas. She would come in in the morning and go, in her very high voice, "Nick, can we make the drums sound like cannons?" So we would go in and try to make this drum kit sound like it was cannons going off – every kick drum, every snare. We made up these corrugated iron tunnels coming out of the drum kit, and we would mike up the tunnel.

He worked with producer Colin Newman of Wire on the Virgin Prunes' If I Die I Die (1982) before securing his first major production role on the fifth album by Midnight Oil, 10, 9, 8, 7, 6, 5, 4, 3, 2, 1 (1982).

== Production technique ==
Asked in the Mix interview for his formula for making a record, he said he usually went into rehearsals for about two weeks, experimenting with songs and arranging them in different ways, but with "strong, solid ideas" about how the songs should be arranged. After about two weeks' work, he enters the studio with the band:

I always work in studios where the whole band can be in the same room looking at each other ... The main point is to have fun and to basically capture that band at that point in their life doing the absolute best performance of that song. And if it takes 20 takes, then we'll do 20 takes. If they do two takes and the first one is just killer, then I might push them to do five just to see. And we might go back to that first take and use that. I record on analog because it sounds the best. There's nothing in the digital area yet that sounds as good as analog. Anybody who says there is hasn't listened to analog or hasn't lined their tape machine up properly.

== Production credits ==
- 1980: "Heart of Darkness" by Positive Noise
- 1981: "Flowers of Romance" single by Public Image Ltd
- 1981: The Flowers of Romance by Public Image Ltd
- 1981: "Follow the Leaders" single by Killing Joke
- 1981: What's THIS For...! by Killing Joke
- 1981: "To Hell with Poverty!" single by Gang of Four
- 1981: "Release the Bats" single by The Birthday Party
- 1981: "Earthbeat" single by The Slits
- 1982: "Empire Song" single by Killing Joke
- 1982: "Pagan Lovesong" by Virgin Prunes
- 1982: Junkyard by The Birthday Party
- 1982: 10, 9, 8, 7, 6, 5, 4, 3, 2, 1 by Midnight Oil
- 1983: Seance by The Church
- 1983: The Pleasure of Your Company by Models
- 1983: Grapes of Wrath by Spear of Destiny
- 1984: Red Sails in the Sunset by Midnight Oil
- 1984: The Swing by INXS
- 1985: Big Canoe by Tim Finn
- 1985: Out of Mind, Out of Sight by Models
- 1985: Over the Rainbow by Virgin Prunes
- 1985: Waiting for the Floods by The Armoury Show
- 1988: Bonk by Big Pig
- 1990: Code Blue by Icehouse
- 1991: Honeychild (album) by Jenny Morris
- 1992: Sand in the Vaseline: Popular Favorites by Talking Heads
  - "Popsicle", "Gangster of Love", "Lifetime Piling Up"
- 1992: Uh-Oh by David Byrne
- 1993: Earth and Sun and Moon by Midnight Oil
- 1994: Peach by The Lupins
- 1995: Example by For Squirrels
- 1996: Amazing Disgrace by The Posies
- 1997: Freak Show by Silverchair
- 1997: Transmitter by Automatic
- 1997: Never Bet the Devil Your Head by Subrosa
- 1998: Feeling Strangely Fine by Semisonic
- 1998: Freak*on*ica by Girls Against Boys
- 1998: Vicious Precious (EP) by Primary
- 1999: Neon Ballroom by Silverchair
- 1999: Chronicle Kings by Earth to Andy
- 2000: Consent to Treatment by Blue October
- 2000: Stereodreamscene by Deckard
- 2001: Roll On by The Living End
- 2002: Androgynous Jesus by Must
- 2003: Nocturama by Nick Cave and the Bad Seeds
- 2003: The Art of Losing by American Hi-Fi
- 2004: Aiming for Your Head by Betchadupa
- 2004: Abattoir Blues/The Lyre of Orpheus by Nick Cave and the Bad Seeds
- 2006: Nux Vomica by The Veils
- 2006: State of Emergency by The Living End
- 2007: Young Modern by Silverchair
- 2007: Grinderman by Grinderman
- 2007: Welcome the Night by The Ataris
- 2007: Is Is by Yeah Yeah Yeahs
- 2008: Diamond Hoo Ha by Supergrass
- 2008: Dig, Lazarus, Dig!!! by Nick Cave and the Bad Seeds
- 2009: It's Blitz! by Yeah Yeah Yeahs
- 2009: Quicken the Heart by Maxïmo Park
- 2009: Ignore the Ignorant by The Cribs
- 2010: Grinderman 2 by Grinderman
- 2011: Ornaments from the Silver Arcade by Young Knives
- 2013: Push the Sky Away by Nick Cave and The Bad Seeds
- 2013: Mosquito by Yeah Yeah Yeahs
- 2014: Himalayan by Band of Skulls
- 2015: Coming Forth by Day by Cassandra Wilson
- 2015: Freedom by Refused
- 2016: Skeleton Tree by Nick Cave and The Bad Seeds
- 2018: Wrong Creatures by Black Rebel Motorcycle Club
- 2018: Hunter by Anna Calvi
- 2018: Joy as an act of resistance by IDLES
- 2019: Scatter the Rats by L7
- 2019: Ride Again by Shakespeare's Sister
- 2019: Devour You by Starcrawler
- 2024 Cartoon Darkness by Amyl and the Sniffers
- 2026 We Mean It, Man! by Gogol Bordello

=== Mix/Recording credits ===
- 1981: The Dreaming by Kate Bush
- 1981: Face Value by Phil Collins
- 1985: Behind the Sun by Eric Clapton
- 1990: Suicide Blonde 12" by INXS
- 2004: A Song Is a City by Eskimo Joe
- 2005: Animal Serenade by Lou Reed
- 2007: Neon Bible by Arcade Fire
- 2008: Twenty One by Mystery Jets
- 2010: The Suburbs by Arcade Fire
- 2018: Joy as an Act of Resistance by IDLES
- 2019: Peek by CRX
- 2021: Comfort To Me by Amyl and the Sniffers

== Filmography ==
- Plush (2013)

== Awards ==
=== ARIA Music Awards ===
The ARIA Music Awards is an annual awards ceremony that recognises excellence, innovation, and achievement across all genres of Australian music. They commenced in 1987.

Year	Nominee / work	Award	Result	Ref.
1997	Nick Launay for Freak Show by Silverchair	Producer of the Year	Nominated	
1998	Nick Launay for "The Door" by Silverchair	Engineer of the Year	Won	
1999	Nick Launay for "Supposed to Be Here", "24000", "This Is the Sound" and "Come to Take You Home" by Primary and Neon Ballroom by Silverchair	Producer of the Year	Nominated	
1999	Nick Launay for "Supposed to Be Here", "24000", "This Is the Sound" and "Come to Take You Home" by Primary and Neon Ballroom by Silverchair	Engineer of the Year	Won	
2001	Nick Launay for Roll On by The Living End	Producer of the Year	Nominated	
2001	Nick Launay for Roll On by The Living End	Engineer of the Year	Nominated	
2006	Nick Launay for State of Emergency by The Living End	Producer of the Year	Nominated	
2006	Nick Launay for State of Emergency by The Living End	Engineer of the Year	Nominated	
