= Sherine Abeyratne =

Australian singer

- Born: Sherine Yvonne Abeyratne; 1961 (age 64–65); London, England, United Kingdom
- Occupations: Singer, Percussionist
- Formerly of: Big Pig (1985-1991); Backing vocalist for: Jo Jo Zep and the Falcons; Models; INXS; U2

Sherine Yvonne Abeyratne (born 1961) is an English-born Australian singer and percussionist, of Sri Lankan descent, who was performed as both a lead and backing vocalist.

== Biography ==
=== Early life ===
Abeyratne and her identical twin sister, Zan Abeyratne were born in 1961 in London, England to Sri Lankan-born parents, who also have two sons; their mother entertained her children by playing piano and dancing, while their father shared his admiration of Louis Armstrong and jazz music. After moving from London, the family lived in Sri Lanka for "several years" before migrating to Australia, where they were raised

=== Career ===
Sherine and her sister performed as backing vocalists for several groups including Jo Jo Zep, Models, INXS and U2

Both sisters became vocalists in bands both together, and separately, from 1978. They were members of Grand Wazoo, Whist Sherine left to become a backing vocalist for Jo Jo Zep and then INXS, Zan became a member of Bang. Sherine provided lead vocals for Big Pig from 1985 to 1991.

Sherine was also associated with Grand Wazoo Band of 1000 Dances, The Editions (1980–84), Bang, Big Choir, Bob Starkie Shape Up, Gospel Truth, Jo Jo Zep, Black Coffee, Dianna Boss and The Extremes, The Rock Party, Mercy Mercy (1991), Sherine, and Sherine's X Machine.
