= Buster Stiggs =

English-born New Zealand drummer (1954–2018)

Mark John Hough (8 December 1954 – 7 January 2018), known by the stage name Buster Stiggs, was an English-born New Zealand drummer.

Hough was born in Harold Wood, Essex, England, in 1954, moving to New Zealand as a child. His family settled in Hawke's Bay, and he attended Hastings Boys' High School before studying art at Elam School of Fine Arts in Auckland from 1972 to 1975. He began studying to be a teacher in 1976, but his primary interests were art and rock music, especially the nascent New Zealand punk scene.

Hough's first band was After Hours, the first band of a teenage Neil Finn, which lasted until 1977 when Finn was asked to join his brother's band, Split Enz. From here, Hough moved to the short-lived Fang, for whom he played drums. By late 1977 he was playing with up-and-coming Auckland punk band Suburban Reptiles using the stage name Buster Stiggs, which would remain with him for his whole musical career. He was a main songwriter of the band, writing their single "Saturday Night Stay At Home".

After briefly playing guitar with The Scavengers for a couple of gigs in 1978, Stiggs and fellow Suburban Reptile Bones Hillman joined Split Enz founder Phil Judd — a former schoolmate at Hastings Boys' — in a new three-piece band, The Swingers. The Swingers found quick success, and hit the charts with two singles, "One Good Reason" (1980) and "Counting the Beat" (1981). The latter reached the top of the charts in both New Zealand and Australia.

Stiggs left The Swingers just as their second single was starting to hit the charts, joining Australian band Models. He stayed with the band for under a year, failing to gel fully with the band's sound. After leaving Models, he moved to the back room of the rock industry, working as a graphic designer and designing record covers and tour posters.

Stiggs struggled with kidney disease and multiple myeloma in the last few years of his life, and finally succumbed to their combined effects in his adopted city of Perth, Australia, on 7 January 2018. He is survived by one son.
