= James Valentine (broadcaster) =

Australian musician and radio/TV presenter (1962–2026)

James Valentine AM
- Born: James Matthew Valentine; 12 September 1961; Ballarat, Victoria, Australia
- Died: 22 April 2026 (aged 64) Sydney, New South Wales, Australia
- Occupations: Musician; radio and television presenter; writer
- Instruments: Saxophone
- Years active: 1980–2026
- Formerly of: Jo Jo Zep & the Falcons; Models; Absent Friends

James Matthew Valentine (12 September 1961 – 22 April 2026) was an Australian musician, and radio and television presenter. As a saxophonist, he was a member of Jo Jo Zep (1982), Models (1984–87), and Absent Friends (1989–90).

== Early life and education ==
James Matthew Valentine was born on 12 September 1961 in Ballarat, Victoria. His father was a car salesman and his mother taught elocution and was a part-time radio announcer. He had two older brothers.

He attended Ballarat Grammar School where he learned saxophone, performing in the local area. In the early 1980s Valentine relocated to Melbourne to attend university, but after getting gigs from his second year onwards, "didn't pay much attention to uni after that because [he] wanted to be a jazz musician".

== Music career ==
In 1982, Valentine joined Joe Camilleri's group, Jo Jo Zep.

Valentine, on saxophone, and Kate Ceberano (later a member of I'm Talking), on lead vocals, were members of Diana Boss and the Extremes, a covers band which performed The Supremes material. Other members included James Freud (of Models) on bass guitar, Barton Price (also of Models) on drums and Zan Abeyratne (of I'm Talking, with Ceberano) on co-lead vocals. He described his experience, "The rhythm section of that band was The Models. When that finished, they asked me to go on tour with them and then I never left. All of a sudden I was in this pop band wearing black leather jackets."

He joined Models in late 1984, when they relocated to Sydney and he played saxophone with them until 1987, the group broke up in June of the following year. As a member of Models he appears on their studio albums, Out of Mind, Out of Sight (September 1985) and Models' Media (October 1986).

Valentine joined Absent Friends on saxophone and clarinet in 1989. They recorded an album, Here's Looking Up Your Address (April 1990). He also worked for Wendy Matthews (ex-Models, Absent Friends) on her debut solo album, Émigré (November 1990).

On 27 October 2010, Valentine as a member of the Models, was inducted into the ARIA Hall of Fame, in a presentation by Matthews, who was also a member of the band.The line-up of Duffield, Ferrie, Kelly, Mason, Price and Valentine performed "I Hear Motion" and "Evolution" at the induction ceremony.

== Radio and television career ==
Valentine was both a radio and television presenter. He was the host of The Afternoon Show on ABC TV, a children's afternoon TV series, from February 1987 until 1990. Valentine continued at the ABC as a presenter of TVTV, and later The Mix.

As a radio presenter he worked on 666 ABC Canberra, and presented the Afternoons show on ABC Radio Sydney as well as Upbeat each Sunday morning on ABC Jazz. Valentine wrote and presented comedy sketches on air for the ABC's Humour Australia website.

Valentine narrated Come Dine with Me Australia from 2010 to 2013 and Celebrity Come Dine With Me Australia from 2012 to 2014. He took over from Wendy Harmer and Robbie Buck as host of ABC Radio Sydney's Breakfast from Monday 13 December 2021 after the pair ended their run on Friday 10 December 2021.

At the end of 2023, it was announced that Valentine would return to the afternoon program, with Craig Reucassel taking over the breakfast show.

He announced his retirement from radio on 2 February 2026 to spend time on cancer treatment and to be with family.

== Writing ==
Valentine was also the author of a series of books for teenage boys, including the sci-fi novel trilogy JumpMan.

== Personal life ==
James Valentine was married to Joanna and the couple had two children.

=== Illness and death ===
In late 2023, Valentine had difficulty swallowing a meal, and underwent an endoscopy. This revealed a large tumour between the oesophagus and the stomach, and he was diagnosed with oesophageal cancer. He was offered two alternative treatments by different doctors, and chose the less invasive option, as the other, involving major surgery, would render him unable to play saxophone, as well as other major adjustments. He was treated in March 2024, but in June 2025 was alerted to a tumour in his omentum.

He died on 22 April 2026, at the age of 64, using voluntary assisted dying. Governor-general Sam Mostyn told ABC Radio that Valentine had been recommended and approved for appointment as a Member of the Order of Australia in the weeks before his death.

== Bibliography ==
- Valentine, James (2002), Jumpman, Random House Australia, ISBN 978-1-74051-789-8
  - Valentine, James (2005), Jumpman Rule #1 Don't Touch Anything (1st US ed.), New York Simon & Schuster Books for Young Readers, ISBN 978-0-689-86872-6
- Valentine, James (2003), Jumpman Rule 2, Random House Australia
  - Valentine, James (2005), Jumpman Rule #2 Don't Even Think About It! (1st US ed.), New York Simon & Schuster Books for Young Readers, ISBN 978-0-689-87353-9
- Valentine, James (2004), JumpMan Rule 3 : See Rule One!!!, Random House Australia, ISBN 978-1-74051-901-4
