= Mark Opitz =

Australian record producer

Mark Opitz AM
- Born: 1952 (age 72–73); Melbourne, Victoria, Australia
- Origin: Sydney, New South Wales, Australia
- Genres: Rock
- Occupations: Record producer, audio engineer
- Years active: 1971–present
- Website: markopitz.com

Mark Opitz AM (born 1952) is an Australian record producer and audio engineer. He started his career with the Australian Broadcasting Corporation in 1971. He has produced AC/DC, the Angels, Australian Crawl, Cold Chisel, Divinyls and INXS. He has won the ARIA Award for Producer of the Year in 1987 and 1988. He had previously won Best Australian Producer at the Countdown Awards for his work in 1980, 1982, 1985 and 1986. On 8 June 2020 he was appointed a Member of the Order of Australia (AM) for "significant service to the performing arts, particularly to music production." In August of that year he was listed as one of The 7 Most Influential Music Producers of All Time by Mixdown Magazine's David Tomisch and Will Brewster.

== Early years and personal life ==
Mark Opitz was born in Melbourne in 1952. His mother Shirley, his father and an older sibling had moved from Darwin in the early 1950s to suburban Upwey and then Croydon. During childhood his parents separated, he remained with his mother, living in Burwood. She worked as a nurse. His neighbour and best friend was Kym Gyngell. The family relocated to Brisbane when his parents were briefly reconciled. After the couple separated again Opitz and his sibling were cared for by various people before being placed in the Margaret Marr Memorial Home for Boys in Wynnum – run by the Methodists. While there he was subjected to emotional and physical abuse by the staff and bullying by fellow boarders. After leaving the boys home he relocated to Sydney in the early 1970s. He has four children from his two marriages. As from 2012 Opitz was married to Natalie (his second wife): they met in November 1998 at the Mushroom 25 Concert.

== Career ==
Opitz started his career at the Australian Broadcasting Corporation's ABC TV in Sydney in 1971 as a studio trainee working on children's TV show Mr. Squiggle and rock music series GTK. Initially he aspired to be a programme director, "I started as a cameraman. I worked on music shows." He became an audio engineer. In order to become a record producer he transferred to EMI in 1974 working in the mastering department. By 1976 he was label manager for EMI's Australian division of Capitol Records. He worked as assistant producer for EMI's in-house productions.

Opitz took a position as Vanda & Young's apprentice producer at EMI Studios 301 in Sydney in 1977. Under their tutelage he worked with Albert Productions artists AC/DC, Rose Tattoo, John Paul Young and Flash and the Pan. He developed his production skills as an audio engineer, mixing engineer and record producer. His early producing jobs were on the Angels' albums Face to Face (1978) and No Exit (1979). He assisted the Angels to develop their signature sound with thick guitars, which dominated Australia's 1980s airwaves.

Warner Music's management offered Opitz the position as Head of A&R during 1980, while he was producing the East album for Cold Chisel. As A&R he signed Billy Field and Divinyls to the label. He also produced further albums for Cold Chisel, Richard Clapton, Swanee and the Hitmen. He left Warner in 1982 to buy Rhinoceros Studios in Sydney, with a commercial partner, and set up his own production company. Over the next five years he produced albums for Jimmy Barnes, INXS, Models, Hoodoo Gurus, Australian Crawl, Noiseworks and the Reels. During the 1980s Opitz won Australian music industry awards for his production work on six occasions: Best Australian Producer at the Countdown Awards for 1980, 1982, 1985 and 1986; as well as Producer of the Year at the ARIA Music Awards of 1987 and the following year.

Opitz was based primarily in the United States and Europe during the 1990s while working with international artists. However, he produced more INXS studio albums Welcome to Wherever You Are (1992) and Full Moon, Dirty Hearts (1993). He had accompanied the group on their international tour, which resulted in the live album, Live Baby Live (1991), as well as Live at Wembley Stadium 1991 from their performance at Wembley Stadium. In the late 1990s Michael Gudinski of Mushroom Records invited Opitz to join his executive team and oversee Australian music recording projects in readiness for the sale of Gudinski's label to News Limited. Opitz worked in various facets of Mushroom Records' business interests and produced the Mushroom 25th Anniversary series of concerts, albums and TV/VHS specials in 1998.

Opitz is included in Billboard's All Time Top "Producer Encyclopaedia", which covers all genres of music. He worked with Bob Dylan on latter's Academy Award ceremony performance of "Things Have Changed" from the movie The Wonder Boys and on Kiss and Melbourne Symphony Orchestra's recording Kiss Symphony: Alive IV (2003). He has also worked with Lenny Kravitz, Ray Charles and the Beach Boys. Opitz' company The Best Seat in the House produced the INXS DVD/TV special I'm Only Looking for international release through Warner Music in the US and Universal Music for the rest of the world. This project included many interviews, mini-documentaries as well as music videos and live performance footage. He also produced the music for Kiss' US TV special/DVD release Rock the Nation in 2006 and Paul Stanley's solo project in 2007. He produced albums for Rose Tattoo, Jeff Lang, and Monique Brumby.

As of 2011 Opitz was a full voting member in all categories of both ARIA Awards in Australia and Grammy Awards in the US. He developed music programmes by merging various music genres for rock group Bad//Dreems from Adelaide. In 2016, the Australian National University (ANU) spent $12 million to establish their School of Music with Opitz as a Visiting Fellow of that department. In August 2017 he was listed as one of The 7 Most Influential Music Producers of All Time by Mixdown Magazine's David Tomisch and Will Brewster.

== Bibliography ==
- Wallis, Luke; Jenkins, Jeff; Opitz, Mark (2012), Sophisto-Punk: the Story of Mark Opitz and Oz Rock, North Sydney, NSW: Penguin Random House Australia, ISBN 978-1-74275-794-0

== Technical works ==
List of technical works by Mark Opitz
Year	Artist(s)	Work	Role(s)	Ref.
1977	John St Peeters	"Summer of Love" (single)	Producer	
1977	Reg Lindsay	Silence on the Line	Engineer	
1977	AC/DC	Let There Be Rock	Engineer	
1978	The Angels	Face to Face	Engineer, producer	
1978	The Angels	After the Rain – The Tour (EP)	Producer	
1978	AC/DC	Powerage	Engineer	
1979	The Angels	No Exit	Engineer, producer	
1979	The Reels	The Reels	Engineer, producer	
1979	The Angels	Out of the Blue (EP)	Producer	
1980	Cold Chisel	East	Engineer, producer	
1980	Swanee	Into the Night	Producer	
1981	The Hitmen	The Hitmen	Producer	
1981	Cold Chisel	Swingshift	Mixer, producer	
1982	Richard Clapton	The Great Escape	Producer	
1982	Divinyls	Monkey Grip EP	Producer	
1982	Cold Chisel	Circus Animals	Engineer, producer	
1982	INXS	Shabooh Shoobah	Engineer, producer	
1982	Swanee	This Time Its Different	Producer	
1983	Australian Crawl	Semantics (EP)	Producer	
1983	Divinyls	Desperate	Producer	
1983	INXS	Dekadance	Engineer, mixer, producer	
1984	Cold Chisel	Twentieth Century	Engineer, mixer	
1984	Eurogliders	This Island	Producer	
1984	Richard Clapton	Solidarity	Producer	
1984	Jimmy Barnes	Bodyswerve	Engineer, mixer, producer	
1984	Mental As Anything	"Apocalypso (Wiping the Smile Off Santa's Face)" (single)	Producer	
1984	Cold Chisel	Barking Spiders Live: 1983	Producer	
1984	Deckchairs Overboard	"Walking in the Dark" (single)	Producer	
1985	Divinyls	What a Life!	Producer	
1985	Flame Fortune	Flame Fortune (12" EP)	Producer	
1985	The Venetians	Step off the Edge	Producer	
1985	Models	Out of Mind, Out of Sight	Mixer, producer	
1985	Deckchairs Overboard	Deckchairs Overboard	Producer	
1985	Jimmy Barnes	For the Working Class Man	Producer	
1986	INXS and Jimmy Barnes	"Good Times" (single)	Producer	
1986	Spaniards	Locked in a Dance	Producer	
1986	Models	Models' Media	Producer	
1987	Hoodoo Gurus	Blow Your Cool!	Producer	
1987	Noiseworks	Noiseworks	Producer	
1987	INXS	Kick	Mixer, remaster	
1987	Jimmy Barnes	Freight Train Heart	Producer	
1987	Mental As Anything	Mouth to Mouth	Mixer	
1988	The Saints	Prodigal Son	Mixer	
1988	The Venetians	Amazing World	Producer	
1989	The Ocean Blue	The Ocean Blue	Producer	
1989	Mental As Anything	Cyclone Raymond	Producer	
1989	Cats in Boots	Kicked & Klawed	Producer	
1989	Scary Bill	Scary Bill	Producer	
1990	Steelheart	Steelheart	Producer	
1990	Red House	Red House	Producer	
1990	INXS	X	Remaster, remixer	
1991	INXS	Live Baby Live	Mixer, producer	
1991	Roxus	Nightstreet	Producer	
1992	1927	1927	Producer	
1992	INXS	Welcome to Wherever You Are	Producer, remaster, remixer	
1992	Ghost of an American Airman	Life Under Giants	Mixer, producer	
1993	INXS	Full Moon, Dirty Hearts	Mixer, producer	
1994	INXS	"The Strangest Party (These Are the Times)" (single)	Producer	
1997	Inqbator	Hatched	Mixer, producer	
1998	Hunters & Collectors	Juggernaut	Mixer, producer	
1998	Paul Kelly	Words and Music	Producer, remixer	
1999	Deadstar	Somewhere Over the Radio	Producer	
1999	Jimmy Barnes	Love and Fear	Engineer, mixer, producer	
1999	Little Angels	Little of the Past	Producer	
2002	Brooklyn Run	Brooklyn Run	Producer	
2002	Jimmy Barnes	Raw	Mastering, mixer	
2003	Kiss	Kiss Symphony: Alive IV	Mixer, producer	
2007	Rose Tattoo	Blood Brothers	Photographer, producer	
2007	Billy Thorpe	Solo – The Last Recordings	Producer	
2008	Paul Stanley	One Live Kiss	Mixer	
2009	Jeff Lang	Chimeradour	Producer	
2012	Sunset Riot	Uprising	Producer	
2013	Owen Campbell	The Pilgrim	Producer	
2017	Black Aces	Anywhere But Here	Producer	
2020	Rose Tattoo	Outlaws	Engineer, mixer, producer	

== Awards and nominations ==
=== ARIA Music Awards ===
The ARIA Music Awards is an annual awards ceremony that recognises excellence, innovation, and achievement across all genres of Australian music. They commenced in 1987.

Year	Nominee / work	Award	Result
1987	himself	Producer of the Year	Won
1988	himself	Producer of the Year	Won

=== TV Week / Countdown Awards ===
Countdown was an Australian pop music TV series on national broadcaster ABC-TV from 1974–1987, it presented music awards from 1979–1987, initially in conjunction with magazine TV Week. The TV Week / Countdown Awards were a combination of popular-voted and peer-voted awards.

Year	Nominee / work	Award	Result
1980	himself for East by Cold Chisel	Best Australian Producer	Won
1982	himself	Best Australian Producer	Won
1984	himself for work with Australian Crawl, INXS & Divinyls	Best Australian Producer	Nominated
1985	himself	Best Australian Producer	Won
1986	himself	Best Australian Producer	Won
