= James Freud =

Australian musician (1959–2010)

Background information
- Born: Colin Joseph McGlinchey; 29 June 1959; Melbourne, Victoria, Australia
- Died: 4 November 2010 (aged 51) Melbourne, Victoria, Australia
- Genre: Rock
- Instruments: Vocals, bass guitar, guitar
- Years active: 1976–2010
- Label: Mushroom

James Randall Freud (born Colin Joseph McGlinchey; 29 June 1959 – 4 November 2010) was an Australian rock musician-songwriter. He was a member of Models during the 1980s and wrote their two most popular singles, "Barbados" and "Out of Mind, Out of Sight".

His autobiographies I am the Voice Left from Drinking (2002) and I am the Voice Left from Rehab (2007) detail his career in music entertainment and addictions. On 27 October 2010, Models were inducted into the ARIA Hall of Fame by former member Wendy Matthews; Freud was absent from the ceremony.

== Biography ==
=== Early life ===
Freud was born as Colin Joseph McGlinchey on 29 June 1959 to Joe and Hannah McGlinchey and grew up in Melbourne. His interest in music began before he started school. "From the time I was five, I realised that was what I wanted to do. My uncle gave me all Frankie Avalon records and I just loved them. That was it, that was all I wanted to do". His father left the family when Freud was in his early teens. He attended St Thomas More Catholic Boys College in Vermont South (now part of Emmaus College).

Despite Freud's passion and musical talent, his mother, Hannah, was against the idea. He later changed his name to James Randall Freud. At the age of 17, Freud left to pursue his career and did not contact her for over two years. "We didn't communicate in any way until I could validate myself as a musician".

=== Early career (1976–1982) ===
Freud formed his first band, Sabre, at the age of 16, with high school friend and guitarist Sean Kelly and drummer Ian McFarlane. Their first performance was at his younger sister's slumber party. After hearing the Sex Pistols' song "God Save the Queen" in 1977, Freud formed The Spred with Kelly, and three other members. Formed late in 1977, Teenage Radio Stars was a glam-punk band with Freud on lead vocals and guitar and Kelly on guitar and vocals. When the opportunity came to record a single, "I Wanna Be Your Baby", later covered by Uncanny X-Men, two members were fired. Mick Prague and Mark Harvey joined the band and performed "I Wanna Be Your Baby" on Countdown.

By early 1979, with ex-members of Colt, he formed James Freud & the Radio Stars with Murray Doherty on bass guitar, Roger Mason on keyboards, Glenn McGrath on drums and Bryan Thomas on guitar, and later Tony Harvey playing guitar and Mick Prague on bass. This line up plus various guest artists recorded the album Breaking Silence between July and November 1979, with Tony Lugton and Peter Cook contributing before the completion and release in 1980. The former Colt members, Murray Doherty, Glenn McGrath and Bryan Thomas went on to form local Melbourne band Mod Cons and added vocalist/guitarist Derek Beautyman in 1980. Later, Tony Lugton (ex-Steeler) replaced Harvey on guitar and also provided keyboards. Further changes by year's end resulted in Freud and Mason joined by Peter Cook on guitar and backing vocals and Tommy Hosie on drums. They signed with Mushroom Records and their debut single, "Modern Girl," from Breaking Silence was released in May 1980, which peaked at No. 12 on the Australian Kent Music Report Singles Chart. They supported British singer-keyboardist, Gary Numan on his Australian tour. James Freud & the Radio Stars' debut album Breaking Silence was released in June, it was produced by Tony Cohen.

Breaking Silence impressed Numan such that he offered to produce an album for Freud in the UK. Because there was already a British band known as the Radio Stars, a name change occurred for Freud's backing band, who became known as James Freud & Berlin. In October, they released "Enemy Lines" from Breaking Silence. "Automatic Crazy", produced by Numan, followed in March 1981. However, neither Freud nor Numan were happy with the London-recorded album and it was not released. One month later Freud disbanded the group.

=== Models (1982–1988) ===
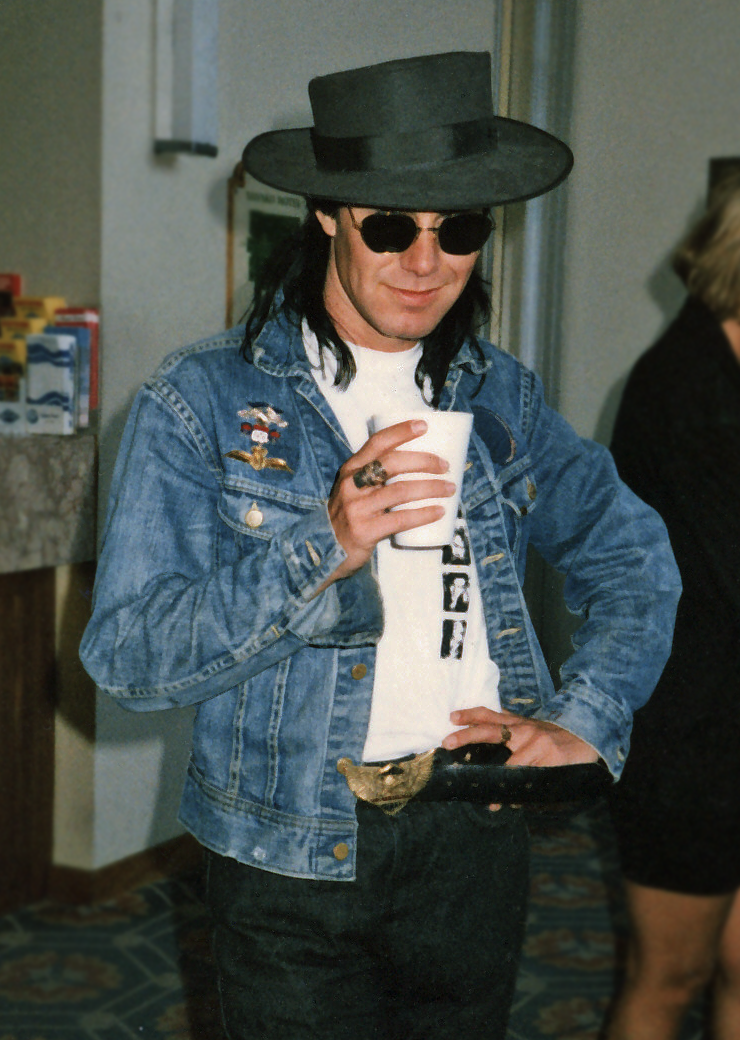
James Freud in San Francisco, California, on tour with Models 1986

In 1982, Freud joined Models as bass guitarist after the departure of Mark Ferrie, reuniting with old collaborator Kelly. Freud shared lead vocalist duties on some songs, beginning with one of his compositions, "Facing The North Pole in August" from The Pleasure of Your Company, recorded in 1983. In 1985, Two Freud-penned hits, "Barbados" (co-written with Andrew Duffield) and "Out of Mind, Out of Sight", took Models to No. 2 and No. 1 on the Australian singles chart, respectively. He remained in the band until they split in 1988.

=== Post-Models solo career (1989–2010) ===
In 1989, Freud went solo again, releasing Step into the Heat, the most expensive album released by Mushroom Records up to that point. However, it was not successful. In his 2002 autobiography Freud blamed the low quality of the songs he had written. After performing on pop music show Countdown Revolution, he criticised the show's format to music commentator, Ian Meldrum (creator and presenter on the earlier Countdown). Meldrum dismissed Freud with, "You're nothing but a fucking has-been. Look around you. See the new hosts of the show. They are the future of Australian music. You're on your way out now".

Freud teamed with vocalist and guitarist Martin Plaza as the dance group Beatfish, releasing an eponymous record in 1992. In 1995, Freud canned his next proposed solo album, BigMouth, but some material was used on the Hawaiian surf-themed Postcard to Hawaii album released in 1996 by his next band, Moondog. Freud was the lead vocalist with Plaza and Phil Ceberano on guitar and backing vocals. In 1999, he performed "One Tony Lockett", an ode to the footballer Tony Lockett, at the Sydney Cricket Ground, and released Today's Legends of AFL Football as James Freud & the Reserves.

In 1996, Freud went on to compose, sing and write the lyrics for the main title theme to the Australian children's television series Swinging for ABC TV.

Freud published his first autobiography in 2002, I Am the Voice Left from Drinking where he detailed his alcoholism and described how he nearly died on 24 March 2001 from alcohol poisoning and massive blood loss, "I was standing upon the wreckage of my youth; I probably wouldn't make it through the night and as I lay there, I couldn't help but wonder, 'How did I end up like this?'".

From 2007 to 2009 Freud performed with Melbourne tribute band 80s Enuff at Melbourne's Crown Casino. In 2008, he released See You in Hell, which was to prove his last solo studio album. Prior to his death, Freud was manager for his sons' band, Attack of the Mannequins, and assisted them with the development of their debut album, Rage of the World.

== Personal life ==
Freud married Sally Clifton in October 1983. Sally has written four books including Thank You, Goodnight: A Backstage Pass to Australian Rock'n'roll (1997) on the music industry. Together they had two sons, Jackson and Harrison Freud. The brothers formed their own rock band, Sonic Dogma, in 2005, which later became Attack of the Mannequins; the band was managed by Freud. His two autobiographies' titles, I am the Voice Left from Drinking (2002) and I am the Voice Left from Rehab (2007) refer to a lyric in the hit song "Barbados". The books chronicle his descent into alcoholism and his subsequent recovery attempts. His widow and two children reside in Melbourne, Australia.

== Death ==
On 4 November 2010, Freud was found dead at his home in Hawthorn, Melbourne. A week earlier, on 27 October, Models had been inducted into the ARIA Hall of Fame without Freud attending the ceremony. His absence was explained publicly as due to commitments to managing his sons' band. Privately, organisers were told that Freud would not attend because he could not be anywhere near alcohol. During the ceremony, Kelly explained the absence by saying Freud had "another bicycle accident".

A statement by Michael Gudinski, whose Mushroom Records launched Freud's solo career and that of Models, said:

James' battle with alcoholism has been well chronicled. His two books on his recovery and five years' sobriety were best-sellers and gave a lot of people who were suffering the same affliction comfort and hope. Unfortunately, James has succumbed to his disease and taken his own life this morning.

== Discography ==
=== Studio albums ===
List of albums, with selected chart positions
Title	Album details	Peak chart positions
Title	Album details	AUS
Breaking Silence (As James Freud and the Radio Stars)	Released: June 1980; Format: LP; Label: Mushroom Records (L37309)	75
Step into the Heat	Released: June 1989; Format: Label: Mushroom Records (TVL903306)	26
See You in Hell	Released: April 2008; Format: DD, CD; Label: Beatfish Records	-

=== Singles ===
List of singles, with selected chart positions
Year	Title	Peak chart positions	Album
Year	Title	AUS	Album
1980	"Modern Girl" (As James Freud and the Radio Stars)	12	Breaking Silence
1980	"Enemy Lines" (As James Freud's Berlin)	84	Breaking Silence
1981	"Automatic Crazy" (And Berlin)	-	Breaking Silence
1989	"Hurricane"	20	Step into the Heat
1989	"One Fine Day"	-	Step into the Heat
1989	"Let's Get It On"	-	Step into the Heat
1999	"There's Only One Tony Lockett" (and the Reserves)	38	Today's Legends of AFL Football

== Bibliography ==
Freud has written the following:

- Freud, James (2002). I am the Voice Left from Drinking : the Models – from the 'Burbs to 'Barbados' and Beyond. Pymble, NSW: HarperCollins. ISBN 0-7322-7440-0.
- Freud, James (2007). I am the Voice Left from Rehab. North Sydney, NSW: Random House. ISBN 978-1-74166-556-7.
