= Sean Kelly (Australian musician) =

Australian musician (born 1958)

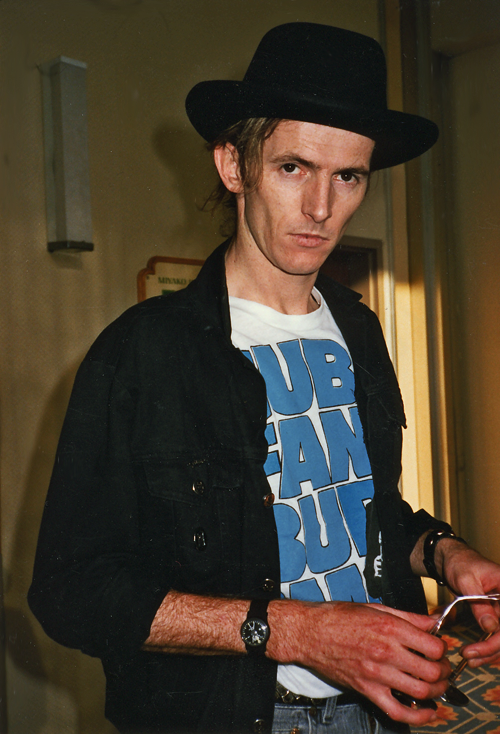
- Kelly in San Francisco, California, 1986

Background information
- Born: Sean Patrick Kelly; 9 November 1958 (age 67); Sydney, New South Wales, Australia
- Genres: Rock, new wave
- Years active: 1977−present
- Labels: Suicide, Mushroom, Polydor, RooArt, Columbia, Sony Music, Liberation Blue

Sean Patrick Kelly (born 9 November 1958) is an Australian singer, guitarist and songwriter best known as a founding member of the bands Models, Absent Friends and The Dukes.

== Early life ==
In his youth, Kelly was exposed to a variety of musical genres that eventually influenced his own style. Before developing a taste for pop music and the Top 40s, he would listen to his parents classical music and show tunes. Growing up in an Irish Catholic family, he was exposed to music from an early age. His mother, sisters and cousins play the piano, and he too learned how to play before switching to the guitar and drums in his teens.

At age 13, he took up guitar lessons and was taught by Ian Miller from JPY (John Paul Young) and the Allstars. Although his first love was the drums, he shifted focus to the guitar to further his ambitions as a songwriter. He met James Freud (Colin McGlinchey) in high school (St Thomas More Catholic Boys College) and the two of them got together with Ian McFarlane to form their first band. At the age of 15, he left home and moved into a boarding house in St Kilda, busking at Kings Cross and Paddy’s Market in Sydney.

== Career ==
Kelly started his professional career in 1977 in Spred, later called Teenage Radio Stars, alongside James Freud, who eventually joined him in Models. This was his first foray into the world of punk rock. Kelly joined the band when he was invited by Freud to replace another guitarist and even took on the role of a vocalist for the first time. After leaving Teenage Radio Stars, Kelly and fellow band member Peter Sutcliffe (Pierre Voltaire) joined with former JAB members Janis Friedenfelds (Johnny Crash) and Ash Wednesday to form Models. Models continued, with many line-up changes, until 1988.

Kelly released a solo single "Thankyou Goodnight" in 1989 and formed Absent Friends with his partner Wendy Matthews and Garry Gary Beers that same year. After a top ten album, Here's Looking Up Your Address (#7), a top ten single, "I Don't Wanna Be With Nobody But You" (#4), and an ARIA award the band broke up in 1990. Kelly provided guitar on Matthews' debut solo album, Émigré (November 1990).

Sean Kelly and The Iron Dukes were formed in 1990, becoming The Dukes soon after. After releasing the ARIA nominated album Harbour City the band broke up in 1994.

Since then, Kelly has played with Interchange Bench (1993–1998) alongside Andrew Duffield, Billy Miller, Ken Firth and Cal McCalpine; and also with Astrid Munday and Dystopia (1996–1999), together with Astrid Munday (vocals), Stephen Moffat (guitar), Tim Cleaver (bass), Shamus Goble (drums), Rosie Westbrook (bass) and Craig Williamson (drums). Kelly toured with a reformed Models in 2000 and 2001 before releasing his first solo album Moons of Jupiter in 2006. All but two of the tracks on Moons of Jupiter were songs recorded by Kelly with previous bands.

In 2010, Sean Kelly was inducted into the ARIA Hall of Fame for his work with Models, alongside many of his former bandmates (James Freud, Barton Price, Roger Mason, Andrew Duffield, Mark Ferrie and James Valentine). Over the years, Kelly has led several reunion shows of Models and toured with a reformed version of the band alongside Mark Ferrie, Barton Price and Andrew Duffield. Most notably, the band reunited to perform at the Homebake Festival and the Countdown Spectacular in 2006, followed by a series of one-off concerts with varying lineups.

== Discography ==
=== Albums ===
Title	Album details
Moons of Jupiter	Released: 2006; Label: Liberation Blue

=== Singles ===
Year	Title
1989	"Thankyou Goodnight"
