= Jenny Morris discography =

List of songs and albums made by Jenny Morris

- Studio albums: 6
- Soundtrack albums: 1
- Compilation albums: 2
- Singles: 25
- Video albums: 3
- Other appearances: 15

This article has the discography of Jenny Morris, a New Zealand-born, Australian-based singer and songwriter. She has released six studio albums, three video albums and twenty-five singles, in addition to two compilation albums on record labels WEA, EastWest, rooART, Yep! and Liberation Blue.

Morris' first success came with New Zealand band The Crocodiles, who had a top 20 hit single with "Tears". Re-locating to Sydney, Australia in February 1981, she became a back-up vocalist for INXS before going on to a successful solo career. Her Australian top 5 ARIA Albums are Shiver in 1989 and Honeychild in 1991, and her top 5 ARIA Singles are "She Has to Be Loved" and "Break in the Weather".

== Albums ==
=== Studio albums ===
List of studio albums, with selected chart positions and certifications
Title	Details	Chart peak positions		Certifications (sales thresholds)
Title	Details	AUS	NZ	Certifications (sales thresholds)
Body and Soul	Released: July 1987; Label: WEA (254897); Format: CD; Producer: Andrew Farriss, Mark Moffatt	13	21	ARIA: Platinum; RMNZ: Gold
Shiver	Released: 24 July 1989; Label: WEA (256462); Format: CD; Producer: Farriss	5	6	ARIA: 3× Platinum; RMNZ: Platinum
Honeychild	Released: October 1991; Label: EastWest (903175480); Format: CD; Producer: Mark Forrester, Nick Launay, Jenny Morris	5	5	ARIA: Platinum; RMNZ: Gold
Salvation Jane	Released: August 1995; Label: WEA, rooART (630110912); Format: CD; Producer: Farriss, Moffatt	70	—	
Hit & Myth	Released: August 2002; Label: Yep! Records (YEP005); Format: CD; Producer: Morris, Nick Wales	—	—	
Clear Blue in Stormy Skies	Released: 24 June 2006; Label: Liberation Blue (BLUE0882); Format: CD; Producer: Morris, Steve Balbi	—	—	
"—" denotes releases that did not chart or were not released in that country.

=== Compilation albums ===
List of compilation albums, with selected chart positions and certifications
Title	Details	Chart peak positions		Certifications (sales thresholds)
Title	Details	AUS	NZ	Certifications (sales thresholds)
The Best of Jenny Morris: The Story So Far	Released: November 1992; Label: EastWest (450991118); Format: CD; Producer: Various	12	4	ARIA: Gold; RMNZ: Gold
Listen: The Very Best of Jenny Morris	Released: 16 April 2004; Label: WEA (5046725952); Format: CD; Producer: Various	—	—	
"—" denotes releases that did not chart or were not released in that country.

=== Soundtracks ===
List of soundtracks, with selected details
Title	Details
Dancing Daze (by Jenny Morris, Wendy Matthews, Mark Williams, Marc Hunter & Jane Clifton)	Released: February 1986; Label: ABC Music (RML 53191); Format: CD, LP; Producer: Martin Armiger

== Singles ==
List of singles with selected chart positions and certifications
Title	Year	Peak chart positions		Certifications	Album
Title	Year	AUS	NZ	Certifications	Album
"Puberty Blues"	1981	88	—		Non-album singles
"Little by Little"	1982	—	—		Non-album singles
"Get Some Humour"	1985	92	—		Non-album singles
"Dancing Daze" (with Wendy Matthews)	1986	—	—		Dancing Daze
"You're Gonna Get Hurt"	1986	24	—		Body and Soul
"Might Have Been" (with Wendy Matthews and Mark Williams)	1986	—	—		Dancing Daze
"Body and Soul"	1987	55	—		Body and Soul
"You I Know"	1987	13	30		Body and Soul
"Lighthearted"	1987	70	30		Body and Soul
"Saved Me"	1989	27	37		Shiver
"She Has to Be Loved"	1989	5	3	ARIA: Gold; RMNZ: Gold	Shiver
"Street of Love"	1989	51	—		Shiver
"Aotearoa"	1990	—	35		Shiver
"Self Deceiver"	1990	94	—		Shiver
"Piece of My Heart"	1990	24	—		Non-album single
"Break in the Weather"	1991	2	5	ARIA: Gold	Honeychild
"I've Had You"	1991	39	39		Honeychild
"Zero"	1992	89	33		Honeychild
"Crackerjack Man"	1992	125	—		Honeychild
"Tears"	1992	92	18		The Best of Jenny Morris: The Story So Far
"The Price I Pay"	1993	78	—		Salvation Jane
"Only We Can Hear"	1994	120	—		Salvation Jane
"Rhythm and Flow"	1995	119	—		Salvation Jane
"In Too Deep"	1995	143	—		Salvation Jane
"What Do I Do Now"	1996	180	—		Salvation Jane
"Home"	2001		—		Hit & Myth
"Downtime"	2002	—	—		Hit & Myth

== Video albums ==
List of video albums
Year	Album details
1987	Body & Soul: Released: 1987; Label: WEA; Format: VHS
1992	The Story So Far: Released: 1992; Label: Warner Music Australia; Format: VHS
2005	Alive: Released: May 2005; Director: Ross Wood; Label: Warner Vision (BASE011); Format: DVD

== Other appearances ==
=== Various artists ===
- 1989 – Two ("I Wish I Was a Little Grub", "Isn't It Funny") ABC Records
- 1989 – Six ("Papa oom mow mow") ABC Records
- 1996 – Mantra Mix ("Rhythm and Flow")
- 1998 – Good Vibrations – A Concert for Marc Hunter ("O Zambezi", "In Too Deep")
- 1999 – The Underwater Melon Man
- 2002 – The Women at the Well ("Beggar on the Street of Love" – Track 14)

=== As session musician ===
- 1982 – Geoff Chunn – Tracks
- 1983 – I Am Joe's Music – I Am Joe's Music
- 1983 – Models – The Pleasure of Your Company
- 1984 – D.D. Smash – The Optimist
- 1984 – INXS – The Swing
- 1984 – Dropbears – Dropbears
- 1984 – INXS – Dekadance ("Jackson" duet with Michael Hutchence)
- 1989 – Various – ABC Children's Series No 2
- 1997 – Moondog – Moondog

== Music videos ==
- "Any Day of the Week" (with the Crocodiles) (1980)
- "Tears" (with the Crocodiles) (1980)
- "Hello Girl" (with the Crocodiles) (1980)
- "Telephone Lover" (with the Crocodiles) (1980)
- "Everywhere I Go" (with QED) (1983)
- "Solo and More" (with QED) (1984)
- "This One" (with QED) (1984)
- "Get Some Humour" (1985)
- "You're Gonna Get Hurt" (1986)
- "Body and Soul" (1987)
- "You I Know" (1987)
- "Lighthearted" (1987)
- "Are You Ready"(1987)
- "Saved Me" (1989)
- "She Has to Be Loved" (1989)
- "Street of Love" (1989)
- "Self Deceiver" (1990)
- "Break in the Weather" (1991)
- "I've Had You" (1991)
- "Zero" (1992)
- "Crackerjack Man" (1992)
- "Tears" (1992)
- "The Price I Pay" (1993)
- "Only We Can Hear" (1994)
- "In Too Deep" (1995)
- "Downtime" (2002)
