= Listen: The Very Best of Jenny Morris =

Greatest hits album by Jenny Morris
- Released: 16 April 2004
- Recorded: Sydney
- Genre: Pop
- Length: 43:43
- Label: Warner
- Producer: Andrew Farriss; Mark Forrester; Nick Launay; Alan Mansfield; Don Miller-Robinson; Jenny Morris

Jenny Morris chronology
Hit & Myth (2002)	Listen: The Very Best of Jenny Morris (2004)	Clear Blue in Stormy Skies (2006)

Listen: The Very Best of Jenny Morris is a compilation of songs by Australia-based New Zealand rock singer Jenny Morris. It includes both of her top 10 Australian hits, "She Has to Be Loved" and "Break in the Weather". Essentially a repackaging of her previous compilation, The Best of Jenny Morris: The Story So Far with new artwork and a bonus track, "Little Little", a gentle love song to her unborn child, taken from her 1989 album, Shiver.

== Track listing ==
Listen: The Very Best of Jenny Morris
No.	Title	Writer(s)	Length
1.	"Body & Soul" (Produced by A. Farriss)	Jenny Morris	3:17
2.	"She Has to Be Loved" (Produced by A. Farriss)	J. Morris, A. Farriss	4:05
3.	"Break in the Weather" (Produced, recorded and mixed by N. Launay)	J. Morris, T. Morris	4:32
4.	"Saved Me" (Produced by A. Farriss)	J. Morris, A. Farriss	3:49
5.	"You I Know" (Produced by M. Moffat)	N. Finn	4:09
6.	"Little Little" (Produced by A. Farriss)	J. Morris	3:55
7.	"Street of Love" (Produced by A. Farriss)	P. Kelly	3:13
8.	"Jackson" (Duet with Michael Hutchence, Produced by A. Farriss)	B. Wheeler, G. Rodgers	3:38
9.	"You're Gonna Get Hurt" (Produced by A. Farriss)	A. Farriss	3:39
10.	"Tears" (Produced by J. Morris, M. Forrester, remixed by N. Launay)	F. Flaws, A. Baysting	4:05
11.	"I've Had You" (Produced by J. Morris, M. Forrester, remixed by N. Launay)	J. Morris, P. Kelly	4:58
12.	"Zero" (Produced, recorded and mixed by N. Launay)	J. Morris, A. Farris	4:33
13.	"Fear" (Produced by D. Miller-Robinson, J. Morris)	J. Morris, T. Morris	3:37
14.	"Crackerjack Man" (Produced by J. Morris, M. Forrester, remixed by N. Launay)	J. Morris, A. Farriss	3:42
15.	"Self Deceiver" (Produced by A. Farriss)	J. Morris, P. Kelly	3:32
16.	"Get Some Humour" (Produced by A. Mansfield)	J. Morris	4:11
17.	"Piece of My Heart" (Produced by A. Farriss)	J. Ragovoy, B. Berns	3:16
