= The Best of Jenny Morris: The Story So Far =

Greatest hits album by Jenny Morris
- Released: November 9, 1992
- Recorded: 1985–1992
- Genre: Pop
- Label: EastWest (4509911182)

Jenny Morris chronology
Honeychild (1991)	The Best of Jenny Morris: The Story So Far (1992)	Salvation Jane (1995)

The Best of Jenny Morris: The Story So Far is the first greatest hits album by Australia-based New Zealand musician Jenny Morris. It was released in November 1992 and peaked at No.4 in New Zealand and 12 in Australia. It features tracks from her three studio albums, Body and Soul, Shiver and Honeychild and it includes both of her top 10 Australian hits, "She Has to Be Loved" and "Break in the Weather".

== Singles ==
"Tears" was released as a single and peaked at No92 in Australia and No18 in New Zealand. It was a cover of The Crocodiles' single from 1980, a band of which Morris was the lead singer.

== Track listing ==
CD

1. "Tears" (4:05)
2. "Get Some Humour" (4:11)
3. "You're Gonna Get Hurt" (3:39)
4. "Body and Soul" (3:17)
5. "You I Know" (4:09)
6. "Saved Me" (3:50)
7. "She Has to Be Loved" (4:05)
8. "Street of Love" (3:14)
9. "Self Deceiver" (3:32)
10. "Piece of My Heart" (3:17)
11. "Break in the Weather" (4:33)
12. "I've Had You" (4:58)
13. "Zero" (4:34)
14. "Crackerjackman" (3:42)
15. "Jackson" (with Michael Hutchence) (3:38)
16. "Fear" (4:56)

== Charts ==
Chart (1992–93)	Peak position
Australian ARIA Albums Chart	12
New Zealand Albums Chart	4

== Certifications ==
Region	Certification	Certified units/sales
Australia (ARIA)	Gold	35,000^{^}
New Zealand (RMNZ)	Gold	7,500^{^}
^{^} Shipments figures based on certification alone.
