= Jonathan Zwartz =

New Zealand-born Australian jazz musician and composer

- Born: Jonathan Peter Zwartz; Auckland, New Zealand
- Genres: Pop; jazz
- Occupation: Musician
- Instruments: Bass guitar; double bass
- Years active: 1981–present
- Labels: Independent; The Planet Company; MGM
- Formerly of: The Crocodiles
- Website: jonathanzwartz.com

Jonathan Peter Zwartz is a New Zealand-born Australian jazz musician. In the 2018 ARIA Music Awards, he won the Best Jazz Album category for his third album, Animarum, released in 2018.

== Early life ==
Zwartz was born in New Zealand.

== Career ==
=== 1980s ===
Jonathan Zwartz joined New Zealand pop band, the Crocodiles, on bass guitar, alongside Tony Backhouse on piano, Jenny Morris on lead vocals, Rick Morris (her brother) on guitar, and Barton Price on drums. The group were based in Auckland and performed at Sweetwaters 1981 in January before they relocated to Sydney in the following month. In July of that year Morris left to start her solo career, the remaining members had recorded a single, "Hello Girl", with vocals by Rick but they disbanded soon after.

Late in 1981 Zwartz and Backhouse formed the Vulgar Beatmen with Peter Boyd and Mike Gubb (both ex-Rough Justice). He became a session musician. Zwartz and Backhouse also joined ex-the Crocodiles member, Fane Flaws' project I Am Joe's Music, which issued a self-titled album in 1983. Other former members of the Crocodiles with contributions were Jenny Morris, Arthur Baysting and Peter Dasent. A single, "Life in Asia", was issued by the group in August, which Woroni's reviewer described, "Life on Coota beach perhaps. Complete with self styled poseuring, hip singing and New Zealand brand of paranoia. Basic and forgettable shit."

=== 1990s ===
In 1991 Zwartz, on bass guitar, joined the Bernie McGann Trio, a Sydney-based jazz group, with McGann on saxophone and John Pochee on drums. McGann eschewed piano and explained, "You tend to think that because there's no piano in the group, you're restricted to just playing some songs. But I think you can play anything at all, and it's a very open sort of group which when it works, works extremely well indeed."

In 1992, Zwartz was a member of Bobby Gebert's trio, alongside Gebert on piano and Andrew Dickeson on drums, which backed visiting English saxophonist, Ronnie Scott, in a performance in Canberra. Michael Foster of The Canberra Times wrote, "Wherever Scott went [the trio] were right with him, seemingly not needing the charts which Scott supplied. Their confidence was impressive, and justified."

Zwartz played double bass as a member of the Umbrellas, a Sydney jazz ensemble, with Dasent on piano, organ and accordion, Mark Bruwel on oboe, James Greening on trombone, Toby Hall on drums and Tim Hopkins on tenor saxophone. The Umbrellas recorded an album, Soundtrack to the Passing Parade (August 1993).

Zwartz worked in Vince Jones' backing band in November 1993, with Jones on trumpet and vocals, Hopkins on tenor saxophone, Peter Jones (no relation) on drums, Barney McAll on piano, and Ray Pereira on percussion. Once more the performance was well received by Foster.

=== 2000s ===
In 2000 he co-produced a ten-episode jazz music series, Pulse, for ABC-TV.

In 2009 Zwartz issued his debut solo album, The Sea.

=== 2010s ===
His next album, four years later, The Remembering & Forgetting of the Air (July 2013), was described by John Shand of The Sydney Morning Herald, as "...ambient in intent (although it could be used that way). But it has a deep peacefulness and a simple beauty carrying an implicit hint of ineffable sadness... [with] carefully layered production creates three-dimensional sound images...".

Zwartz third solo album, Animarum (February 2018), was feature album of the week on ABC Jazz, with their reviewer opining, "yet another smörgåsbord of intricate compositions, woven together... Each piece is unique, drawing on a plethora of musical influences from all over – yet they are also sequenced together to create a truly engrossing musical experience."

In June 2018 he led a performance of Animarum at the Sydney Con International Jazz Festival, which was well reviewed by The South Sydney Herald.

== Discography ==
=== Albums ===
Title	Details
The Australia 2000 Suite (with Bobby Gebert Trio, Andrew Dickeson)	Released: 1997; Label: Australia Council For The Arts; Format: CD
The Sea	Released: 2009; Label: Jonathan Zwartz; Format: CD
The Remembering & Forgetting of the Air	Released: 29 July 2013; Label: Jonathan Zwartz; Format: CD
Animarum	Released: February 2018; Label: Jonathan Zwartz (JZ003); Format: CD
This World (with Mike Nock, Hamish Stuart and Julien Wilson)	Released: 2019; Label: Lionsharecords (LSR20196); Format: CD, DD
Another Dance (with Mike Nock, Hamish Stuart and Julien Wilson)	Released: January 2022; Format: CD, Digital; Label: Lionsharecords (LSR20212)

== Awards and nominations ==
=== AIR Awards ===
The Australian Independent Record Awards (commonly known informally as AIR Awards) is an annual awards night to recognise, promote and celebrate the success of Australia's Independent Music sector.

Year	Nominee / work	Award	Result
2010	The Sea	Best Independent Jazz Album	Nominated
2013	The Remembering and Forgetting of the Air	Best Independent Jazz Album	Won
2019	Animarum	Best Independent Jazz Album	Won
2020	This World	Best Independent Jazz Album or EP	Nominated

=== ARIA Music Awards ===
The ARIA Music Awards is an annual awards ceremony that recognises excellence, innovation, and achievement across all genres of Australian music.

Year	Nominee / work	Award	Result	Ref.
2013	The Remembering & Forgetting of the Air	Best Jazz Album	Nominated	
2018	Animarum	Best Jazz Album	Won	
2020	This World (with Hamish Stuart, Julien Wilson & Mike Nock)	Best Jazz Album	Nominated	
2022	Another Dance (with Hamish Stuart, Julien Wilson & Mike Nock )	Best Jazz Album	Nominated	

=== Australian Jazz Bell Awards ===
The Australian Jazz Bell Awards, (also known as the Bell Awards or The Bells), are annual music awards for the jazz music genre in Australia.

Year	Nominee / work	Award	Result
2010	Epic	Best Australian Jazz Ensemble	Won
2010	"The Sea"	Best Australian Jazz Song	Won
2019	"Animarum" (from Animarum)	Best Jazz Work of the Year	Won

=== National Live Music Awards ===
The National Live Music Awards (NLMAs) are a broad recognition of Australia's diverse live industry, celebrating the success of the Australian live scene. The awards commenced in 2016.

Year	Nominee / work	Award	Result
2016	himself	Live Bassist of the Year	Nominated
2019	himself	Live Bassist of the Year	Nominated
2019	himself	Live Jazz Act of the Year	Nominated
