= Tears (The Crocodiles album) =

Studio album by The Crocodiles
- Released: April 1980
- Recorded: 1980
- Genre: Pop, rock
- Length: 32:31
- Label: Stunn, RCA Victor
- Producer: Glyn Tucker

The Crocodiles chronology
Tears (1980)	Looking at Ourselves (1980)

Singles from Tears
- 1. "Tears" Released: April 1980

Tears is the debut album by New Zealand pop band the Crocodiles. Both the album and title track were released in April 1980, and both reached No. 17 on the New Zealand album and singles charts respectively that year. The band's second single, "Whatcha Gonna Do", wasn't as successful, failing to chart. That year they won Best Group and Most Promising Group at the New Zealand Music Awards.

== Track listing ==
1. "New Wave Goodbye" (Flaws) – 3:20
2. "Any Day of the Week" (Baysting/Flaws/Dasent) - 3:29
3. "All Night Long" (Flaws/Backhouse) - 3:30
4. "Tears" (Baysting/Flaws) - 3:55
5. "In My Suit" (Flaws) - 3:44
6. "Young Ladies in Hot Cars" (Baysting/Backhouse) - 3:08
7. "Whatcha Gonna Do" (Baysting/Dasent) - 2:37
8. "Ribbons of Steel" (Flaws/Foley/Dasent/Backhouse) - 3:03
9. "It's the Latest" (Baysting/Backhouse) - 2:28
10. "Working Girl" (Baysting/Flaws/Dasent) - 3:21

== Singles ==
- "Tears"/"In My Suit" - RCA (MS 433) (1980) (NZ #17)
- "Whatcha Gonna Do"/"All Night Long" - RCA (103619) (1980)
- "New Wave Goodbye"/"Ribbons of Steel" - Aura (AUS126) (1981)

== Personnel ==
- Bass, vocals - Tina Matthews
- Drums - Bruno Lawrence
- Guitar, vocals - Tony Backhouse
- Guitar, vocals - Fane Flaws
- Piano, organ - Peter Dasent
- Vocals - Jenny Morris
