= Second Nature (Margaret Urlich album) =

Studio album by Margaret Urlich
- Released: May 1999
- Recorded: The Shed, Bowral, NSW, Australia, 1998–1999
- Genre: Pop
- Length: 48:39
- Labels: Thom Marketing, Sony Music New Zealand
- Producer: Eddie Rayner

Margaret Urlich chronology
The Deepest Blue (1995)	Second Nature (1999)

Second Nature is the fifth solo album (fourth studio album) by Margaret Urlich. Released in May 1999 in New Zealand, it achieved gold status and was her last album before her death in 2022. Second Nature was produced by Eddie Rayner from Split Enz and was recorded on and off over 12 months and involved musicians from Australia and New Zealand. The album comprised cover versions of some of Urlich's favourite New Zealand songs that she grew up with. These included artists like Split Enz, Crowded House, Dave Dobbyn, Max Merritt, Shona Laing, Don McGlashan and Tim Finn.

== Track listing ==
No.	Title	Writer(s)	Original artist	Length
1.	"Nature"	Wayne Mason	The Fourmyula	4:08
2.	"Slipping Away"	Max Merritt	Max Merritt & The Meteors	5:44
3.	"Tears"	Fane Flaws; Arthur Baysting	The Crocodiles	4:48
4.	"Glad I'm Not a Kennedy"	Shona Laing	Laing	3:57
5.	"I Hope I Never"	Tim Finn	Split Enz	4:19
6.	"Anchor Me"	Don McGlashan	The Mutton Birds	4:13
7.	"Don't Dream It's Over"	Neil Finn	Crowded House	4:20
8.	"Language"	Dave Dobbyn	Dobbyn	4:29
9.	"Whaling"	Dobbyn	DD Smash	4:49
10.	"Love, Hate, Revenge"	Irwin Levine; Ritchie Adams	The Avengers	3:47
11.	"Stuff 'n Nonsense"	T. Finn	Split Enz	4:01
Total length:				48:39

== Charts ==
Second Nature debuted at number 21 before peaking at number 11 in August 1999.

Chart (1999)	Peak position
New Zealand Albums Chart	11

== Certifications ==
Region	Certification	Certified units/sales
New Zealand (RMNZ)	Gold	7,500^{^}
^{^} Shipments figures based on certification alone.
