= Clear Blue in Stormy Skies =

Studio album by Jenny Morris
- Released: 24 June 2006
- Recorded: February 2006
- Genre: Pop
- Label: Liberation Blue
- Producer: Jenny Morris, Steve Balbi

Jenny Morris chronology
Listen: The Very Best of Jenny Morris (2004)	Clear Blue in Stormy Skies (2006)

Clear Blue in Stormy Skies is the sixth studio album by New Zealand singer Jenny Morris. It was released 24 June 2006, by Liberation Blue Records. It is a collection of Morris' remodelled radio hits of the 1980s and 1990s, including a retake of "You I Know", rewritten by its original songwriter, Neil Finn, an instrumental arrangement of her most requested song, "Little Little", and a cover of INXS' song, "This Time", in tribute to her friend Michael Hutchence. The one new song, "This Time", contains the album's title as a lyric.

Clear Blue in Stormy Skies was recorded in February 2006 with members of her backing band, Steve Balbi (Noiseworks, Electric Hippies) who co-produced; Paul Searles (Skunkhour) and Josh Quong Tart.

Morris' vocals were recorded on a vintage valve microphone once used by Frank Sinatra.

We also used a lot of this old spring reverb. It crapped out a lot and it was very frustrating, but man, when it worked it was amazing and I think that's why this album has got that special earthiness about it.

— Jenny Morris

== Track listing ==
1. "Break in the Weather" (J. Morris, T. Morris)
2. "Everywhere I Go" (J. Morris, T. Backhouse)
3. "You I Know" (N. Finn)
4. "The Time" (J. Morris, S.Balbi)
5. "She Has to Be Loved" (J. Morris, A. Farriss)
6. "This Time" (A. Farriss)
7. "Street of Love" (P. Kelly)
8. "Body and Soul" (J. Morris)
9. "You're Gonna Get Hurt" (A. Farriss)
10. "Rhythm & Flow" (J. Morris)
11. "Tennessee Waltz" (Pee Wee King, R. Stewart)
12. "(Little) Little Little" (J. Morris)

== Personnel ==
- Jenny Morris — vocals, guitar, percussion
- Neil Finn — guitar, backing vocals
- Steve Balbi — Produced by, guitars, double bass, toy drums, backing vocals
- Paul Searles — piano, wurlitzer, organ, hammond organ, Rhodes piano, backing vocals, percussion
- Josh Quong Tart — backing vocals
- Nick Hartley - Additional recording and mixing
