= Dropbear (disambiguation) =

Drop bear is a fictitious Australian animal.

Dropbear, drop bear or dropbears may refer to:

- Dropbear (software), an SSH (Secure Shell) software package
- Dropbear (book), a 2021 poetry collection by Evelyn Araluen
- The Dropbears, an Australian band
