= Salvation Jane =

Salvation Jane may refer to:

- Salvation Jane (film), 1927 American silent film directed by Phil Rosen
- Salvation Jane (album), 1995 album by Jenny Morris
- Salvation Jane, a common name for the plant Echium plantagineum in Australia
