= Puberty Blues =

Puberty Blues may refer to:

- Puberty Blues (novel), a 1979 novel by Gabrielle Carey and Kathy Lette
- Puberty Blues (film), a 1981 film based on the novel
- "Puberty Blues" (song), a song by Jenny Morris for the film
- Puberty Blues (TV series), an Australian drama television series
