= Andrew Garton =

Australian filmmaker, musician and lecturer

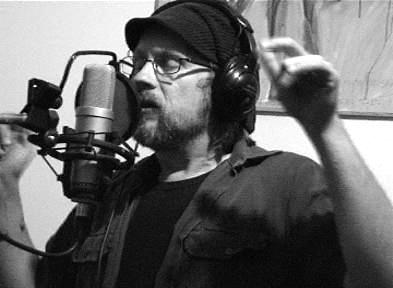
- Garton recording in Melbourne in 2007

Background information
- Born: Andrew Richard Matthew Garton; 19 May 1962 (age 64); Guildford, New South Wales, Australia
- Genres: Instrumental, psychedelic, ambient, folk
- Occupations: Composer, musician, songwriter, producer, film maker
- Instruments: Guitar, bass, keyboards, vocals, saxophone, theremin
- Years active: 1978–present
- Website: andrewgarton.com

Andrew Richard Matthew Garton (born 19 May 1962) is an Australian filmmaker, musician and lecturer in media and communications.

== Biography ==
Andrew Richard Matthew Garton was born on 19 May 1962 in Guildford. His grandmother, Jelena aka Elena (30 May 1903 – 1972), had fled the Russian Revolution post-1917 and worked as a nurse in former Yugoslavia. Elena met and married Andre Garton, a Red Army guard, they had two sons, Alex and Igor (born 14 January 1920). The family initially relocated to Austria; Igor, his mother and other family members migrated to Australia on USAT General Haan in October 1949.

Since the mid-1970s Garton participated in numerous independent and community media initiatives in Australia and South East Asia: from radio and public access video in his teens to computer networking in the late 1980s and 1990s with Pegasus Networks. Garton was motivated at an early age towards collaborative media art works, combining interests in music, performance and public media. In the past twenty-five years he has written and performed plays, joined and formed bands, written scores for television documentaries, penned countless songs, piano and electronic compositions, experimented with recording and performance techniques.

Garton began composing music in the late 1970s and studied composition with composer and pianist, Sykes Rose in the early 1980s. Garton went on to perform, write and record with numerous bands, ensembles and free improvisation groups including Private Lives. By 1983 the line-up was Garton on keyboards and Don Brown on drums (ex-Flowers); Bob Morton on saxophone; Phil Munro on bass guitar; and Jon Needham on guitar. In September that year, Shelley Dempsey of The Canberra Times felt the group were a "not in the least unpleasant sounding Sydney quintet, [they] feature a very stylish mix which is clever, but not too clever". His later groups were Astrobeatniks, Lingo Babel, White Punks on Hope and Back from Nowhere.

In the mid-80s Garton began composing for film and stage. He completed scores for numerous documentaries produced by UK's Channel 4 and the Australian Broadcasting Corporation (ABC), most notably, the award-winning Anyone Can be A Genius and In Grave Danger of Falling Food, a three-part series investigating the life-time work of Permaculture founder, Bill Mollison. Garton and Nick Jeanes co-composed the music for Mollison's ABC-TV series, Global Gardener (1991).

Garton's music for theatre is largely focused on his own solo works and spoken-word operas (Black Harlequin, Ausländer ind Staatenlose), with commissions for Queensland's Omniscient Gallery and the Debacle Theater Company, most notably their landmark interpretation of Anthony Burgess' A Clockwork Orange (1994).

== Collaborations and commissions ==
Garton contributed to several international and Australian collaborations with artists such as Stelarc, Ludwig Zeininger, Kazayuki Null, Hank Bull, Ollie Olsen, Brian Eno, Tetsuo Kogawa, Martin Breindl and Jimi Chen. Garton has performed with the International Theremin Orchestra and continues to be commissioned to produce sound works for both radio and Internet.

1997 saw the completion of his first major generative and online composition, the six-week opus, Sensorium Connect, commissioned by the ABC's, The Listening Room, and produced in collaboration with the performance artist, Stelarc.

In 1999 Garton was awarded the John Bird Award for Excellence in an Online Multimedia Production for his piece, Ausländer Micro, a virtual opera exploring the plight of Eastern European political refugees. The work was part of his Masters project at RMIT University, Ausländer ind Staatenlose (1995–1998), with a libretto based on a short story by his grandmother, Elena Garton. By 1999 Garton was working on Ausländer Micro at Toy Satellite with Justina Curtis, Bruce Morrison and John Power.

Mid-2000, Garton's nine-day, generative composition and installation, Tat Fat Size Temple, a collaborative work produced by Toy Satellite, was released internationally by ORF/KunstRadio (Austria) as CD and Booklet of their landmark collaborative netcast, Sound Drifting.

Other works include sound design for Bodyssey, an interactive CD-ROM by Gary Zebbington; STREET (e)SCAPE, a 24-hour generative soundscape commissioned by Alien Productions, KunstRadio and Polycollege Stobergasse, Austria; Sinawe, a performance produced in collaboration with video artist Kim Bounds, depicting numerous forms of traditional and contemporary Korean music for the Melbourne Fringe Festival.

Works of note include sound design for the award-winning interactives, MEMO, by Matt Riley and Mud Map, by Sam Fermo. Garton was composer/producer and artistic director for the Toy Satellite production, Undercurrents, which premiered at the Taipei International Arts Festival, April 2001. Late 2001 Garton toured Undercurrents in Australia, performing at the Melbourne International Film Festival, Melbourne Fringe Fashion Awards, This is Not Arts Festival and the Multimedia Arts Asia Pacific Festival with support from the Australia China Council.

Mid-2003 Garton completed a major work commissioned by the Australian Centre for the Moving Image - a video installation (From Drift to Derive) and prototype stop-motion narrative engine, D3, taking inspiration from Situationist theorists, including Guy Debord. In September that year The Age's Jenny Sinclair described D3 as a "combined exhibition and authoring engine" where users – typically Melbourne tourists – are able to "tap on a touch-screen map" to access "images from particular locations" and drop them into "a personal image repository".

From 2005 to 2006 Garton curated Frequency Post, a series of five sound pieces from composers in Australia, Taiwan and China, for KunstRadio. The series was broadcast twice across the EU.

You can listen to Garton's collaborative computer performance work Drift Theory 2 online at ABC Classic FM's classic/amp website. In October 2013 Garton presented his documentary, The Light Show, on Hugh McSpedden, a lighting and projection artist prominent from the 1960s to 1980s.

== Films ==
- Forged from Fire, 2019
- This Choir Sings Carols, 2018
- Stupendous, 2018
- Ocean in a Drop, 2017
- The Light Show, 2013

== Discography ==
- EP02, Rat Kangaroo, 2020
- Alone in Space, Andrew Garton, 2019
- EP01, Rat Kangaroo, 2019
- Empty, Andrew Garton, 2018
- Ocean in a Drop, Various artists, 2017
- Chasing the Sun, Andrew Garton, 2013 (Secession Records, SB:01)
- The Light Show, Sun-Bus-5, 2013 (Secession Records, SR:010)
- Son of Science, Andrew Garton, 2008 (Secession Records, SR:008)
- Little Flower, Andrew Garton, One Love Project, 2004 (for Navigator, curated and produced by Monbaza, Taiwan, Jul 2004)
- Headlock, Andrew Garton, 2004 (Secession Records, SR:007)
- Talking Crosswalks, 2004 (various artists, pumpkin records, pump 09–2004)
- Timor Mass, Andrew Garton, 2002 (Earthdance, Melbourne 2002)
- Creating Regions, Lost Time Accident, 2001 (Secession Records, SR:005)
- Secret City, DOODS, 2001 (Secession Records, SR:004)
- Future Schwitters, Andrew Garton, SchwittCD, 2001 (ORF/KunstRadio, Austria)
- Ramp Speed, Dark Ambient Operators, 2000 (MP3 Release, Secession Records, SR:003)
- Tat Fat Size Temple, Andrew Garton, Sound Drifting, 2000 (ORF/KunstRadio, Austria)
- ZERO, A Collection of Minute Soundworks, 2000 (2000 Audio Research Editions, compilation CD, The other side of zero - video positive 2000 - Liverpool, # ARECD103)
- Audible Lines, Lost Time Accident, 1999 (MP3 Release, Secession Records, SR:002)
- TRACE, A Collection of Artists Soundworks, 1999 (1999 Audio Research Editions, compilation double CD, Liverpool Biennial of Contemporary Art 1999, # ARECD102)
- Touchless, International Theremin Orchestra, 1998 (ORF/Kunstradio, Kunst Halle Krems, Austria)
- Age 2 Wonder At, Lost Time Accident, 1998 (Secession Records, SR:001)
- A Clockwork Orange, Andrew Garton and Andy Bagley, 1993 (Debacle Theatre Company, independent release)
- Work, The Private, 1985 (RCA. Despite performing on the album and his keyboard arrangements used elsewhere Garton was not credited.)
- Pleas/Like Her Daddy, Private Lives, 1984 (RCA)
- Live at the Wireless, 1983 (JJJ/ABC Records, live session with Private Lives)
- Pleas, Private Lives, 1983 (Independent EP release, produced by Private Lives and Baldy Karkitt. Recorded at Emerald City and mixed at Alberts Studios, Sydney.)

== Publications ==
=== Books ===
- Garton, A. 2017 - Right to Know - India's Internet Avant-Garde, Digital Empowerment Foundation, ISBN 978-81-933164-2-9

=== Book chapters ===
- Garton, A. 2017 - Doing the right thing, Global Information Society Watch 2017, Association for Progressive Communications, Hivos, ISBN 978-92-95102-83-5
- Garton, A. 2014 - Internet the panopticon: Exhibition and surveillance, Global Information Society Watch 2014 – Communications surveillance in the digital age, Association for Progressive Communications, Hivos, ISBN 978-92-95102-16-3
- Garton, A. 2011 - Australia Country Report, Global Information Society Watch 2011 – ICTs and Environmental Sustainability, Association for Progressive Communications, Hivos, ISBN 978-92-95096-14-1
- Garton, A. 2010 – Australia Country Report, Global Information Society Watch 2010 – ICTs and Environmental Sustainability, Association for Progressive Communications, Hivos, ISBN 92-95049-96-9
- Garton, A. 2008 - Herd Listening, Re-inventing Radio - Aspects of Radio as Art, Revolver, ISBN 978-3-86588-453-4
- Garton, A. 2005 - From BBS to Wireless: A Story of Art in Chips, At a Distance, MIT Press, ISBN 0-262-03328-3

=== Other publications ===
- Garton, A. (2013) Sarawak’s Kleptocracy Strikes Again, New Matilda, 29 Nov 2013
- Garton, A. (2011) Secure My Video Guide, EngageMedia, Floss Manuals
- Garton, A. (2005) Synesthesia Urbania - Towards an Australasian Commons, Filter, Australian Network for Art and Technology Magazine, Issue 61, pp. 4–5
- Garton, A. (2005) From BBS to Wireless: A Story of Art in Chips, At a Distance, MIT Press, ISBN 0-262-03328-3
- Garton, A. (1997) The Politics of Dissonance, Somesuch, Journal of New Musique Australia
- Garton, A. (1997) Theatre as Suspended Space, 1997, Falter, pp. 54–55
- Garton, A. (1997) Multimedia Imaging and Sound: Towards collaborative development of interactive sound and image, WSCG 97 Conference Proceedings, Volume III, Ed. Nadia Magnenat Thalmann, Václav Skala, University of West Bohemia Press, Plzeň, Czech Republic
- Garton, A. (1996) Lost Time Accidents, Somesuch, Journal of New Musique Australia
- Garton, A. (1996) Artists and Copyright in Cyberspace, Artlines, Issue 1.6, Arts Law Centre of Australia, ISSN 1324-695X.
- Garton, A. Parikh, J. Nanda, S. Fernandez, L. (1994) PAN Asia Networking Report, International Development and Research Centre, Singapore / Canada
- Garton, A. Garnsey, R. Peter, Ian. (1993) Networking for NGOs, AUSAID
