= Live at the Wireless =

Live music segment on Triple J

- Genre: Live music
- Running time: Sunday 7:00 pm (Triple J); Tuesday 6:00 pm & Saturday noon (Double J)
- Country of origin: Australia
- Home station: Triple J; Double J
- Hosted by: Anika Luna (Triple J); Caz Tran (Double J)
- Original release: 1983 – present
- Website: Triple J Double J

Live at the Wireless is the name given to live concert and festival recordings captured by Australian national youth radio station Triple J and its sister station Double J.

In the segment's earlier years, artists typically recorded their sets live in Triple J studios, before it shifted to capturing music at venues, which better expressed the crowd atmosphere. The Triple J live music and video team records, mixes and masters all sets.

Triple J have released several CD compilations of live recordings from the segment. In the age of streaming, many individual artists have released their Live at the Wireless recordings as albums, including Middle Kids and Ball Park Music.

== Live at the Wireless 1 ==
Recorded by the Triple team, compiled and released in 1983 was Triple J - Live At The Wireless 1

1. Private Lives - "Pleas"
2. The Particles - ("Bits Of) Wood"
3. Samurai Trash - "Samurai Stomp"
4. The Go-Betweens - "Hammer the Hammer"
5. The Triffids - "My Baby Thinks She's a Train"
6. Second Language - "Random Men"
7. Do-Re-Mi - "Bring the Hammer Down"
8. Dropbears - "Lay Him Down"
9. Soggy Porridge - "You've Changed"
10. Hoodoo Gurus - "Dig It Up"
11. Idiom Flesh - "Ritual"

== Live at the Wireless 2 ==

Recorded by the Triple team, compiled and released in 1991 was Triple J - Live At The Wireless 2

1. Killing Time- Holy Juice
2. Ratcat - Skin
3. Violent Femmes - Kiss Off
4. Louis Tillett- Long Walk Home
5. Concrete Blonde - Make Me Cry
6. Faith No More - Falling to Pieces
7. Nick Barker & The Reptiles- Miles To Go
8. Pop Will Eat Itself- Def. Con. One
9. Beasts Of Bourbon- Bad Revisited
10. Falling Joys- Puppy Drink
11. Andy Prieboy- Tomorrow Wendy
12. Not Drowning, Waving- Albert Namatjira
13. Archie Roach - Charcoal Lane
14. The Welcome Mat- Cake
15. Mudhoney- Touch Me I'm Sick
16. Straitjacket Fits - Such A Daze
17. The Blackeyed Susans- Glory Glory
18. Melanie Oxley & Chris Abrahams - Benchtop
19. Henry Rollins- I Know You

== Live at the Wireless 3 ==
Recorded by the Triple team, compiled and released in 1993 was Triple J - Live At The Wireless 3

1. DEF Rhyme - Sex Be High
2. Underground Lovers - Promenade
3. Matthew Sweet - Devil With the Green Eyes
4. The Truth- My Heavy Friend
5. Lucinda Williams- Changed The Locks
6. Throwing Muses - Firepile
7. Things of Stone and Wood - Share This Wine
8. Skunkhour - Bootyfull
9. Tumbleweed- Sundial
10. Headless Chickens - Juice
11. Belly - Dusted
12. DIG- Reinvent Yourself
13. The Badloves - I Remember
14. The Sharp- Train Of Thought
15. Screaming Jets - Here I Go
16. The Plums - Ride
17. Chris Wilson- The Big One
18. Faith No More - Midlife Crisis
