= Sardine v =

Australian post-punk band

- Also known as: Sardine
- Origin: Sydney, New South Wales, Australia
- Genres: Post-punk
- Years active: 1980–1983
- Labels: EMI; White; Phantom
- Past members: Ian Rilen; Stephanie Rilen; Phil Hall; Greg Skehill; Michael Skinner; Barton Price; Johanna Pigott; John Lloyd; Stuart Dunlop; Andrew Garton; Craig Rossi

Sardine v (Sardine) were an Australian post-punk band, formed in 1980 by Ian Rilen (X, Rose Tattoo) on guitar and vocals, and his then-wife, Stephanie Rilen (a.k.a. Stephanie Falconer) on lead vocals and keyboards. They released a single, "Sabotage" (1982), and an extended play, I Hate You (1983). Other members included Johanna Pigott on bass guitar and Andrew Garton on saxophone. Sardine v disbanded in 1983.

== History ==
According to Ian Rilen, Sardine v formed in 1980 in Sydney, Australia after he bought a keyboard for his children and his then-wife Stephanie Rilen (now Falconer). He had been unaware that Stephanie played piano until an incident when he was writing songs, and she began to play along with him.

Ian was on the guitar and vocals and Stephanie on lead vocals and keyboards. Sardine v soon recruited Phil Hall (Dropbears, Lime Spiders) on bass guitar and Greg Skehill on drums. Their first show, at the Rockgarden on 13 December 1980, was a sell out, sharing the bill with Machinations and Love Mum and the Urgent Ring Me's. An invitation, promotional card for the show was included in the Powerhouse Museum's "Real Wild Child" exhibition from 1994.

Sardine v were managed by SCAM (Suss City Artist Management), which also looked after the Sunnyboys, Machinations, Tablewaiters and Local Product. Lobby Loyde, part owner of SCAM, was co-producer on Sardine v's single, "Sabotage" (1981), with Damien Lovelock of the Celibate Rifles.

Alan Lefebvre of Tharunka opined that it "starts off like another boring pop song – count to 8 and oh but it comes on like a speed rush... Through blurry eyes in the pits of a sleazy pub or early morning Manzil Room is where the 'Sabotage' started... Wonderful stuff, and pass the whisky laced speed, whilst we wait for the album!"

Although the band was popular live (performing for crowds of 800-1000), their music sales did not match this.

A music video of the band performing "Sudan" was broadcast on ABC-TV's pop music show Countdown and showed Ian Rilen on guitar, Stephanie Rilen on keyboards and lead vocals, Johanna Pigott on bass guitar, and Barton Price on drums.

After the group broke up in 1983, Ian Rilen went back to playing with X. Clinton Walker later recalled that they were "inner city modern and looked like a million bucks with Ian in a powder blue suit and his hair all slicked back like a gangster and Steph in an evening gown, but it just fizzled out."

Hunters & Collectors covered their track "Stuck on You" on their 1986 album Human Frailty and added it to their set. Mark Seymour of Hunters & Collectors described the track "A Darlinghurst love triangle. Sardine V, the band... first witnessed at the Trade Union Club, 1983."

Stephanie Rilen later married Doug Falconer, the drummer of that band. Both tracks from the single appeared on compilation albums by various artists. The Deadly Hume covered "I Hate You" on the Phantom Records tenth anniversary compilation, Assorted Desecrations and Magnificent Mutations (1988).

== Members ==
- Ian Rilen – guitar, vocals (1980–83)
- Stephanie Rilen – keyboard, vocals (1980–83)
- Phil Hall – bass (1980–82)
- Greg Skehill – drums (1980–81)
- Michael Skinner - drums (1981)
- Barton Price – drums (1981–82)
- Johanna Pigott – bass (1982)
- John Lloyd – drums (1982)
- Stuart Dunlop – bass (1982–83)
- Andrew Garton – sax (1983)
- Craig Rossi – drums (1983)

== Discography ==
=== Albums ===
- I Hate You (mini-LP) (1983), Phantom PH-18

=== Singles ===
- "Sabotage"/"Sudan" (7") (1982), White Label Records – produced by Lobby Loyde

=== Compilation appearances ===
- "Stuck on You" - Fast Forward, FF008/009 (1982)
- "Sabotage" - The Mushroom Story: The Hits of the Eighties Vol 2, Mushroom MUSH33136.2 (1998)
- "Sudan" - Tales from the Australian Underground: Singles 1976-1989 (2003)
