= The Spats =

New Zealand band

Spats
- Origin: New Zealand
- Years active: 1977–1979
- Past members: Fane Flaws; Peter Dasent; Bruno Lawrence; Tony Backhouse

The Spats were a New Zealand band operating between 1977 and 1979. Members included Fane Flaws, Peter Dasent, Bruno Lawrence and Tony Backhouse. Spats worked with the Limbs Dance Company, a contemporary dance company based in New Zealand. One piece was called New Wave Goodbye.

The band became the nucleus of the Crocodiles, a new wave/pop band.
