= Jenny Morris (musician) =

New Zealand singer (born 1956)

Jenny Morris MNZM OAM
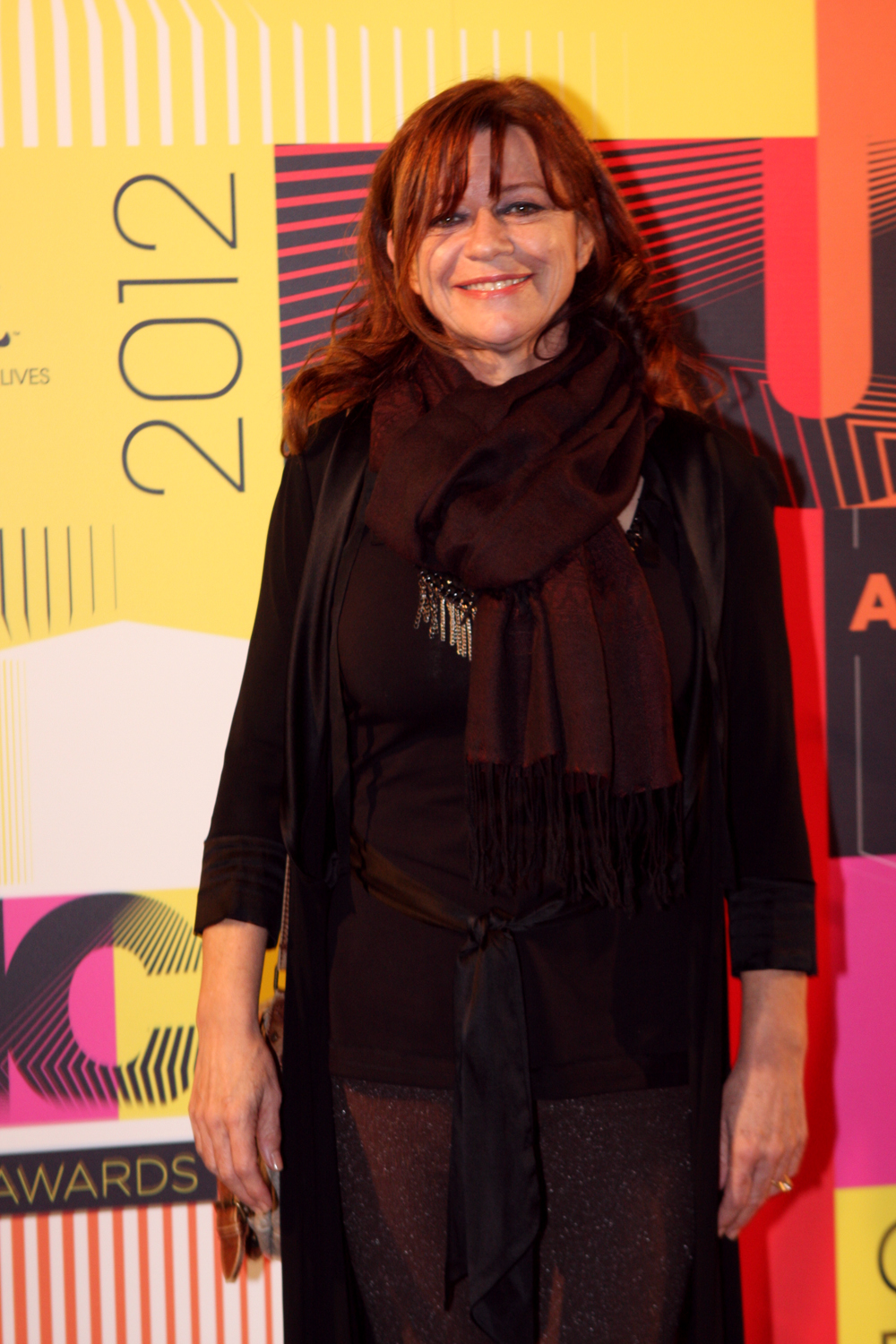
- Morris at the APRA Music Awards in 2012

Background information
- Born: Jennifer Patricia Morris; 29 September 1956 (age 70); Tokoroa, New Zealand
- Origin: Hamilton, New Zealand
- Genre: Pop
- Occupations: Songwriter, singer
- Instruments: Vocals, guitar
- Years active: 1976–present
- Labels: RCA Victor; Stunn; Mushroom; WEA; EMI; rooART; Yep!; Warner Music Australia; Liberation Blue
- Website: jennymorris.com

Jennifer Patricia Morris MNZM OAM (born 29 September 1956) is a New Zealand-Australian singer-songwriter. Her first success came with New Zealand band the Crocodiles, who had a top 20 hit single with "Tears". Re-locating to Sydney in February 1981, she was a backing vocalist for various groups and formed a trio, QED, in 1983.

Morris provided backing vocals for INXS on their 1984 album, The Swing. She then recorded a duet with lead singer, Michael Hutchence, on a cover of Nancy Sinatra and Lee Hazlewood's hit "Jackson"; it was included as a bonus track on the March 1985 (cassette only) INXS EP, Dekadance, which reached number two on the Australian Kent Music Report Albums Chart. Morris worked on their 1985–1986 Listen Like Thieves World Tour.

Her solo career includes top five Australian Recording Industry Association (ARIA) albums with Shiver in 1989 and Honeychild in 1991, and her top five ARIA singles are "She Has to Be Loved" and "Break in the Weather". These albums and singles also peaked in the top ten on the Recording Industry Association of New Zealand (RIANZ) charts.

Morris has won the ARIA Award for Best Female Artist twice, in 1987 and 1988 and was nominated for the same award in 1992. In 2003, on Australia Day (26 January), Morris became an Australian citizen and in 2010 she received the Medal of the Order of Australia. Morris has played a significant role in shaping the Australian music industry through leadership and advocacy especially as board member and then chair of the board of APRA.

On 11 June 2026, Morris was inducted in the ARIA Hall of Fame.

== Early life and education ==
Jennifer Patricia Morris was born on 29 September 1956 in Tokoroa, New Zealand, and grew up in Hamilton with three brothers (Alistair, Rhys and Tam) and four sisters (Maxine, Bronte, Joanne and Shanley). (Note: For full name including diminutive see Australasian Performing Right Association search result for songwriter and performer of "Get Some Humour".: For year of birth and New Zealand, see McFarlane.; For Tokoroa, see Chapman.; For Hamilton, see Dix.; For names of siblings: Tam and Shanley see Aprap article.; For Rhys as brother of Tam see Shopfront Theatre.; For sisters, Maxine, Bronte, Joanne R and Shanley see Gregg.)

Morris wrote a poem on the Vietnam War when she was 12 and used her sister's guitar to put it to music.

== Music career ==
=== Early years and the Crocodiles ===
Morris has stated that her influences include Aretha Franklin and Dusty Springfield. Her first professional performance was at age fifteen, at Andersons Theatre Restaurant, in Hamilton. In 1976 she became a singer with How's Your Father, who were finalists in the 'National Battle of the Bands'. She began working as a Home Economics teacher for two years at a high school near Wellington. Late in 1978, Morris joined an all-girl group, Wide Mouthed Frogs in Wellington, performing lead vocals. Fellow members were Kate Brockie on lead vocals, Andrea Gilkison on guitar, Tina Matthews on bass guitar, Bronwyn Murray on keyboards and Sally Zwartz on drums. In 1979 they released the track, "Some Day" for the compilation album, Home Grown Volume One; "Some Day" was cowritten with Tony Backhouse, guitarist of fellow Wellington band the Spats, which also had a track, "Young Ladies in Hot Cars", on the compilation.

Wide Mouthed Frogs worked with the Spats' members: drummer Bruno Lawrence sometimes played saxophone for them and keyboardist Peter Dasent became their musical director. By 1980, the Spats had evolved into the Crocodiles, under the mentorship of US producer Kim Fowley, and featured Backhouse, Dasent, Fane Flaws (guitar, vocals), Mark Hornibrook (bass guitar), Lawrence, and songwriter Arthur Baysting. Morris was asked to join and soon after, Hornibrook departed and was replaced by Matthews. The Crocodiles were managed by Mike Chunn (ex-Split Enz bassist) and regularly performed in Auckland. In January 1980, they played the high-profile Sweetwaters Music Festival and in April that year, they released their debut album, Tears, produced by Glyn Tucker, and its lead single, "Tears", both reached number 17 on the respective New Zealand albums and singles charts.

Lawrence left and was replaced on drums by Ian Gilroy (ex-Whizz Kids), then Flaws left, although he continued to write material for the second album. Released in November 1980, Looking at Ourselves, was produced by Ian Morris. That year, they won 'Best Group' and 'Most Promising Group' at the New Zealand Music Awards. The line-up went through further changes, Gilroy left to join the Swingers, then Matthews and Dasent left. In February 1981, following a repeat performance at the Sweetwaters Festival, The Crocodiles moved to Sydney, at the behest of their manager, Chunn, with new band members, Barton Price (drums), Rick 'Rikki' Morris (guitar) and Jonathan Zwartz (bass) only to disband in July. Price went on to join Models. Morris explained why The Crocodiles left:

New Zealand is not particularly supportive of its local music industry. [Going to Australia] was something people had done before and been successful, so we decided to do it too and maybe get some extra information from the trip.

— Jenny Morris, 1992.

=== QED and "Jackson" ===
Morris began her solo career with the single, "Puberty Blues" in December 1981 on Mushroom Records; it was the title track from the 1981 film Puberty Blues, which was a local box-office success. The song was written by Tim Finn and performed by Sharon O'Neill in the film. The B-side was "Adolescent Angst", which Morris recorded with The Morris Majors. "Puberty Blues" reached the Australian Kent Music Report Singles Chart top 100. The follow-up single, "Little By Little"—a cover of The Springfields 1960's song—was released in 1982 but failed to chart.

During 1982–1984, Morris continued as a session backing vocalist, contributing to releases by ex-manager Chunn's brother Geoff (also ex-Split Enz); ex-bandmate Flaws' project and album, I Am Joe's Music; the 1983 Models' album The Pleasure of Your Company; and New Zealand outfit D.D. Smash's 1984 album The Optimist, she went on to tour with D.D. Smash front man Dave Dobbyn, and the New Zealand version of The Party Boys. Morris was credited for Dropbears' 1984 mini-LP, Untitled, before contributing backing vocals to INXS' first number 1 album The Swing.

In late 1983, Morris formed QED in Sydney with guitarist Rex Goh (ex-Air Supply) and bassist Ian Belton (ex-Dave Dobbyn, Renée Geyer). The trio signed with EMI Australia and their recordings were produced by Mark Moffatt (The Saints, Mondo Rock, Tim Finn) and Ricky Fataar (Geyer, Finn, Kids in the Kitchen). Morris was now managed by Chris Murphy, who also handled INXS. QED recorded their versions of The Crocodiles' material including, "Everywhere I Go", "Animal Magic" and "You're So Hip"; Morris also co-wrote new songs with Goh. QED's debut single, "Everywhere I Go", was released in December, and performed on national television pop music show, Countdown, on 1 April 1984; it peaked at number 19 on the national chart. The follow-up single "Solo and More" was issued in March, but failed to chart. The third single, "This One", appeared in August and reached top 50. Additional musicians for QED's first album, Animal Magic, included keyboardist Amanda Vincent (Eurogliders, later joined the Jenny Morris band), drummer Steve Fearnly, saxophonist Tony Buchanan, and Fataar on drums. EMI released it in November, but sales remained low and the album did not chart. QED only released one album and disbanded by 1985, Morris continued session and touring work with other artists, Belton went on to Mondo Rock, and Goh to Eurogliders.

Morris recorded a duet with INXS lead singer, Michael Hutchence, on a cover of Nancy Sinatra and Lee Hazlewood's hit "Jackson", it was included as a bonus track on the April 1984 (cassette only) INXS EP, Dekadance, which reached number two on the charts. Morris and INXS performed "Jackson" live at the 1984 Countdown Music and Video Awards held on 19 May 1985. At Murphy's suggestion she teamed with INXS as a backing singer on their 1985 Australian tour—originally just for a few weeks—and stayed on for eighteen months on their 1985–1986 Listen Like Thieves World Tour. During her INXS-time, she shared a flat in Paddington with Hutchence and his partner at that time, producer Michele Bennett.

Morris recorded and, in November 1985, released her first single for Warner Entertainment Australia (WEA), "Get Some Humour", with a contribution from Dave Dobbyn, which reached the top 100.

=== Solo success: 1986–1994 ===
During the US leg of the Listen Like Thieves World Tour, in January 1986, Morris recorded "You're Gonna Get Hurt", which was written and produced by INXS songwriter and keyboardist, Andrew Farriss. Recorded with backing from INXS' Andrew and Jon Farriss and Garry Gary Beers, together with guitarist Ian Moss (ex-Cold Chisel), it was released in September and peaked at number 24. The next single "Body and Soul"—composed by Morris—reached number 55 in mid-1987.

In 1986 she performed on The Rock Party's Everything to Live For, a charity project initiated by The National Campaign Against Drug Abuse (NCADA), which included many Australasian musicians such as Big Pig's Sherine Abeyratne; Crowded House's Neil Finn, Tim Finn, Paul Hester, Eddie Rayner and Nick Seymour; Dynamic Hepnotics' Robert Susz; GANGgajang's Mark Callaghan, Robbie James and Geoff Stapleton; Paul Kelly & the Coloured Girls' Michael Barclay and Paul Kelly; Mental As Anything's Reg Mombassa and Martin Plaza; Models' Sean Kelly; The Promise's Greg Herbert; Rockmelons' Mary Azzopardi, Peter Blakeley and Danny De Costa; The Venetians' Rick Swinn; Vitabeats' Andrew Barnum and Lissa Barnum; and Deborah Conway, Spencer P. Jones, and John Kennedy.

In July 1987, Morris released her first solo album, Body and Soul, produced by Moffatt and Fataar and mixed by Tim Kramer. It sold over 70,000 copies in Australia (platinum status) reaching number 13 on the album charts in Australia and number 21 in New Zealand. The album spawned two further hits in "You I Know"—written by Neil Finn—which reached number 13 in Australia and number 30 in New Zealand, and "Lighthearted" peaked in the top 100 in both countries. Morris also hit the road with her backing band, including Vincent, Jehan Lindsay (ex-Richard Clapton Band), Paul Burton (ex-Mark Williams Band), and Roger Mason (ex-Models). Morris won back-to-back ARIA Awards for 'Best Female Artist' in 1987 and 1988. In 1988, Morris and photographer, Paul Clarke, were married.

Her next single "Saved Me" was released in July 1989 and reached the top 40 in Australia and New Zealand. It featured a distinctly Latin-Spanish feel permeated by funk undertones, with the promo video shot in Nicaragua by Richard Lowenstein. Morris' second solo album Shiver, followed in August and was produced by Farriss, with Morris writing ten of the eleven tracks. In between recording the album, she gave birth to her son, Hugh. The second single was "She Has to Be Loved", a song which melded funk rhythms with a pop hook. In addition, it featured a strong feminist theme, and quickly became a favourite among Morris's female fans. "She Has to Be Loved" became Morris' first Australasian top ten hit reaching number five in Australia and number three in New Zealand during October 1989. Shiver continued to chart over the Southern Hemisphere summer of 1989–1990, peaking at number five on the Australian album charts and number six in New Zealand, it established Morris as one of the best selling female artists in Australia. The track "Aotearoa"—Māori term for 'Land of the Long White Cloud' or New Zealand—received a special single release in New Zealand and reached top 40. The album eventually sold over 250,000 copies, achieving double platinum status in Australia. It spawned two more singles; "Street of Love" written by Australian songsmith Paul Kelly, which reached the top 100 in Australia; and the reggae inspired "Self Deceiver", penned by Morris and Kelly, which reached top 100 in Australia.

As one of Australia's leading female singer-songwriters, Morris toured extensively locally and internationally, first by backing Tears for Fears on the European leg of their 1989 Sowing the Seeds of Love Tour, then on Prince's 1990 Nude Tour in Denmark, Germany and France,—with Dweezil Zappa as her lead guitarist—and again with INXS on their X-Factor tour.

In 1990 she released a cover of "Piece of my Heart"—popularised by Janis Joplin—which peaked in the Australian top 40 in early 1991. She recorded her third album, Honeychild, with producers Nick Launay (Midnight Oil, Killing Joke) and Mark Forrester. The first single from the album, "Break in the Weather", was co-written by Morris and her youngest brother Tam, appeared in September 1991, it reached number two in Australia and number five in New Zealand. Honeychild was released in October and became her second consecutive top ten album, peaking at number five in Australia and New Zealand. Her session musicians, included Wendy Matthews and Midnight Oil's Jim Moginie. Honeychild spawned three more singles; "I've Had You", another Morris and Kelly collaboration, which reached top 50 in Australia and New Zealand; the funk laden "Zero", featuring the rhythm section of drummer Sly Dunbar and bassist Robbie Shakespeare, which peaked top 100 in Australia and top 40 in New Zealand; and "Crackerjack Man", which failed to reach the top 100 ARIA chart in Australia.

On 28 March 1992 Morris performed at the Concert for Life at Centennial Park in Sydney—a fund raiser for the Victor Chang Cardiac Research Centre—with Crowded House, Def FX, Diesel, INXS, Ratcat and Yothu Yindi. Due to inclement weather an expected attendance of 100,000 never eventuated and, with the event only raising $500,000, scandal was expressed in the media over funding distribution.

In November, The Best of Jenny Morris: The Story So Far, a best-of compilation was released, it included "Jackson" which was performed as a duet with Michael Hutchence and INXS on a 1985 Countdown episode, and a re-recorded version of an old The Crocodiles' hit "Tears". The album sold steadily and peaked at number four in New Zealand and number 12 on the Australian charts during May 1993, after Morris had supported Paul McCartney on the Australian leg of his The New World Tour. 1994 saw the birth of her daughter, Bella. Morris' next single, "The Price I Pay", a Billy Bragg cover, was her last appearance on the Australian ARIA top 100 singles chart.

=== Later years: 1995–current ===
Morris' next four singles "Only We Can Hear", "Rhythm and Flow", "In Too Deep", and "What Do I Do Now", were released over eighteen months, from mid-1994 to early 1996. Salvation Jane was released in July 1995, nearly four years after her last album, and featured some of her strongest vocal work, including the languid "Rhythm and Flow," with its Aboriginal influences. Issued on the rooArt label, it was produced by Andrew Farriss and Moffatt, together with Electric Hippies' duo Steve Balbi and Justin Stanley. The album featured songs from a song writing retreat held at Miles Copeland's castle in Bordeaux, France. Here, Morris co-wrote a number of songs with other international songwriters. Also in 1995, Morris became a non-executive writer director on the Australasian Performing Right Association (APRA) Board and as of 2009 is still on the Board. Morris made an appearance in the television drama, Water Rats, in 1997 she continued her gigs, worked for environmental causes and maintained her family life.

In October 2000 she performed with Vika and Linda Bull and Jodi Phillis, at a sold-out Carole King tribute show, Tapestry: the songs of Carole King, held at the Sydney Opera House; it then toured the other Australian capital cities in August–September 2001. In August 2002, Morris' released her next album, Hit & Myth, co-produced by Nick Wales (Coda), was released on 8 May 2002 by Yep! Records. The album features classical musicians (Renaissance Players, Winsome Evans), pop musicians (Davey Lane, Jodi Phillis (ex Clouds)) and jazz (PROP) musicians.

I had people playing on the album from different backgrounds– classical musicians, programmers, jazz musicians, pop. The songs have been crafted so long and so hard, they're not throw away but they're not inaccessible. It's lush, lots of strings beautifully arranged and then groove and beats and really modern sounds and classical guitars as well. It's a collage of all my influences really.

— Jenny Morris

Morris wrote or co-wrote nine of the eleven songs on the album, the others, "Guiding Star", was written by Neil Finn and "The Blacksmith" is a traditional folk song—the first one she learnt on guitar. Neither the album nor the singles "Home", released 29 October 2001, and "Downtime", released 15 July 2002, managed to chart. The music video for "Downtime" featured a number of well-known Australian actors, including Hugo Weaving, Bryan Brown, Matt Newton and Peter Fenton, miming the words to the song. Also in 2002, a portrait of Morris by artist Jan Williamson was entered in the Archibald Prize. The portrait did not win the main prize, but won both the popular awards, the "Packing Room Prize" and "The People's Choice Award". In February, Morris appeared on the SBS TV documentary, Mum's the Word, where high-profile women talked about being a working mother. She sang, "Little Little" an ode to her (then) unborn child written for her 1989 album, Shiver. In October Morris appeared in Finding Joy, a low budget independent Australian feature film, in a cameo role (Tracey). She sings part of a song called "Educated Kind of Thing". In November 2002 she performed at the Candlelight AIDS Memorial, in Darlinghurst, marking the beginning of AIDS awareness week.

In March 2003, Port Fairy's 27th Annual Folk Festival was staged with Archie Roach, John Williamson, Renée Geyer, Morris and emerging Australian band The Waifs were among the popular performers. In October she joined the board of Nordoff-Robbins Music Therapy Australia, and is an active member of their Fundraising Committee.

In April 2004, Listen: The Very Best of Jenny Morris a repackaging of her 1992 compilation, The Story So Far, was issued with new artwork and a bonus track, "Little Little", an ode to her then unborn baby. In May 2005, the Alive DVD was released, it was recorded in Sydney at The Basement and features Morris playing her hits with her band: Steve Balbi (Noiseworks); Paul Searles (Skunkhour); James Hasselwood (The Dissociatives); Jared Underwood (Coda) and actor Josh Quong Tart, with special guest appearances from Ian Moss, Andrew Farriss and Midnight Oil drummer Rob Hirst. The DVD was released with a bonus CD.

Clear Blue in Stormy Skies, her next album, was released by Liberation Music in June 2006 and includes a dozen remodelled versions of her radio hits of the 1980s and 1990s, together with some new material, a cover of the INXS song, "This Time", in tribute to Michael Hutchence, and a new song, "The Time".

In September 2009, Morris toured Afghanistan to Tarin Kowt and Kandahar and played for occupying troops. In October, she appeared on the SBS TV quiz show, RocKwiz, which included a performance of the Crowded House classic, "It's Only Natural", with Don McGlashan. She performed at the closing ceremony of the 2009 World Masters Games in Sydney, together with Dragon and The Choirboys.

In January 2010, Morris received the Order of Australia with a citation, "for service to the arts, particularly music, and to the community through charitable organisations". Morris was glad that her charity, Nordoff-Robbins was recognised. Morris appeared at the 2010 New Zealand International Arts Festival in Wellington on 13 March.

On 22 February 2016, the Australian Taxation Office initiated insolvency proceedings for her company Aymsolo Pty Ltd (aka Jenny Morris Band.)

In May 2017, Morris was the recipient of the Excellence in the Community award in recognition of her achievements behind the microphone and as a fundraiser for charities such as Nordoff-Robbins Music Therapy Australia and Support Act. The ceremony took place in Sydney with a number of guests'; including Neil Finn, Mark Lizotte and Jimmy Barnes performing Morris' songs.

In the 2019 New Year Honours, Morris was appointed a Member of the New Zealand Order of Merit, for services to music and charity fundraising.

In May 2021, Morris was cast in the upcoming superhero film Thor: Love and Thunder, set in the Marvel Cinematic Universe, in an undisclosed role.

== Honours and awards ==
=== Aotearoa Music Awards ===
The Aotearoa Music Awards (previously known as New Zealand Music Awards (NZMA)) are an annual awards night celebrating excellence in New Zealand music and have been presented annually since 1965.

Year	Nominee / work	Award	Result	Ref.
1982	Jenny Morris	Most Promising Female	Nominated	
1982	Jenny Morris	Female Vocalist of the Year	Nominated	
1992	Jenny Morris	International Achievement	Nominated	
1993	Jenny Morris	International Achievement	Won	
2018	Jenny Morris	New Zealand Music Hall of Fame	inductee	

=== ARIA Music Awards ===
The ARIA Music Awards is an annual awards ceremony that recognises excellence, innovation, and achievement across all genres of Australian music. They commenced in 1987.

Year	Nominee / work	Award	Result
1987	"You're Gonna Get Hurt"	Best Female Artist	Won
1988	Body and Soul	Best Female Artist	Won
1992	Honeychild	Best Female Artist	Nominated
2026	Jenny Morris	ARIA Hall of Fame	inducted

=== Countdown Australian Music Awards ===
Countdown was an Australian pop music TV series on national broadcaster ABC-TV from 1974 to 1987, it presented music awards from 1979 to 1987, initially in conjunction with magazine TV Week. The TV Week / Countdown Awards were a combination of popular-voted and peer-voted awards.

Year	Nominee / work	Award	Result
1984	herself	Most Popular Female Performer	Nominated
1986	"You're Gonna Get Hurt"	Best Female Performance in a Video	Won
1986	herself	Most Popular Female Performer	Nominated

=== Order of Australia ===
In 2010, Morris was awarded a Medal of the Order of Australia.

== Personal life ==
Morris married photographer, Paul Clarke, in 1986.

She has two brothers: Tam (a storyboard artist and musician) and Rhys (a graphic designer and web developer), and four sisters: Maxine, Bronte, Joanne and Shanley. Younger sister Shanley Del has also won an ARIA Award – as a country music artist in 1998. Her youngest brother, Tam Morris, co-wrote, "Break in the Weather" with Jenny; he is also in the group Tracky Dax as a singer-songwriter.

In 2003, on Australia Day (26 January), Morris became an Australian citizen. In 2005 Morris noticed the effects of a health disorder, spasmodic dysphonia, which affects both her speaking and singing voice. Subsequently, she has stopped publicly singing and in October 2015 appeared on Australian Story episode "Raise Your Voice" to publicise the disorder.

== Discography ==
- Body and Soul (1987)
- Shiver (1989)
- Honeychild (1991)
- Salvation Jane (1995)
- Hit & Myth (2002)
- Clear Blue in Stormy Skies (2006)

== Film and television ==
=== Film ===
Year	Title	Role	Notes
2002	Finding Joy		Feature film
2022	Thor: Love and Thunder		Feature film

== See also ==
- Music of Australia
- Music of New Zealand
