= The Windy City Strugglers =

- Origin: New Zealand
- Genres: Blues

The Windy City Strugglers are a New Zealand blues band formed in Wellington in 1968. Their music is based on the singing, songwriting, and guitar playing of Bill Lake, and the vocals of Rick Bryant. Their long-serving band members are Andrew Delahunty on guitar, harmonica and mandolin and on double bass Nick Bollinger who has a career as writer, critic and broadcaster and head of Red Rocks Records, the band's label. Their music is a amalgam of mostly black American styles with a range of other historical and contemporary influences. Originally acoustic, the band now largely uses electric instruments.

The group made its debut at the 1968 National Folk Festival when the line-up consisted only of Lake and Geoff Rashbrooke on piano and Mike Rashbrooke on jug. Bryant, already a fixture on the Wellington R&B scene, joined soon after. Though numerous musicians passed through the ranks of the early Strugglers, the group has existed in more or less its current form since Delahunty and Bollinger joined in the mid-1970s. While Bryant and Lake also played in rock groups such as Mammal, the Pelicans, and the Jive Bombers, the Strugglers always existed as an entity in its own right, performing whenever busy schedules make it possible. In 1990 Bryant and Lake released We're in the Same Boat, Brother, a cassette-only album that included some Strugglers material. In 1994 the Strugglers released their own self-titled CD, which won Best Folk Album in the New Zealand Music Awards. In 1998 the Strugglers released their second CD, On Top of the World, which also became a Music Awards winner.

While the Strugglers' blues and jug-band influences have been documented on their previous albums, the 2001 Snow on the Desert Road consisted entirely of original songs by singers Bryant and Lake (in collaboration with songwriting partner Arthur Baysting).

== Discography ==
Date of release	Title	Label	Charted	Certification	Catalog number
Albums
1994	The Windy City Strugglers	Red Rocks Records	–	–	
1998	On Top of the World	Red Rocks Records	–	–	
2000	Live at the Bunker		–	–	
2001	Snow on the Desert Road	Red Rocks Records	–	–	
2004	Kingfisher	Red Rocks Records	–	–	
2008	Shine On	Red Rocks Records	–	–	
2010	"Time Comes Around: The Best of the Windy City Strugglers (album)"	Red Rocks Records	–	–	

== Sources and external links ==
- Band's web site
- "The Windy City Strugglers: A Lifetime in Music" – by Trevor Reekie, for New Zealand Music Magazine.
- Blues artists in New Zealand documenting Rick Bryant, Jubilation, Windy City Strugglers and others
