= Cafe of the Gate of Salvation =

Australian a cappella gospel choir

- Years active: 1986 -

Café of the Gate of Salvation is a non-denominational a cappella gospel choir based in Sydney. Formed by musical director Tony Backhouse they are named after a cafe in Istanbul. Their album A Window in Heaven was nominated for Best World Music Album.

The choir consists of men and women singing in four part harmonies (soprano, alto, tenor, bass) and has ranged in size from thirty to fifty members. Several founding members continue to perform with the choir.

Since the choir's formation Café of the Gate of Salvation has made a commitment to share gospel music's ability to contribute to social justice, spirituality, joy, respect and pride. Run as an artist collective the choir has performed at events and festivals across Australia and the US and performed on the soundtrack of the Australian film Sweetie.

== Discography ==
=== Albums ===
Title	Details	Peak positions
Title	Details	AUS
The Café of the Gate of Salvation	Released: 1992; Label: Cotgos (CD.001); Formats: CD	—
A Window in Heaven	Released: April 1996; Label: Cotgos, Polygram (COTGCD2); Formats: CD	—

== Awards and nominations ==
=== ARIA Music Awards ===
The ARIA Music Awards is an annual awards ceremony that recognises excellence, innovation, and achievement across all genres of Australian music. They commenced in 1987.

Year	Nominee / work	Award	Result	Ref.
1996	A Window in Heaven	Best World Music Album	Nominated	
