= Tina Matthews =

Author/Illustrator and puppet maker

Christina "Tina" Matthews (born 1961 in Wellington, New Zealand) is a New Zealand author/illustrator and a puppet maker who works in Sydney, Australia. She also played bass guitar in bands such as The Wide-Mouthed Frogs and The Crocodiles.

== Biography ==
In 1979, Tina Matthews joined an all-girl group, The Wide Mouthed Frogs in Wellington, playing bass guitar. Fellow members were Jenny Morris on lead vocals, Katie Brockie on vocals, Andrea Gilkison on guitar, Bronwyn Murray on keyboards and Sally Zwartz on drums. In 1979 they released the track, "Some Day" for the compilation album, Home Grown Volume One. In 1980 they played the high-profile Sweetwaters Music Festival. Morris and Matthews also performed at the Sweetwaters Music Festival with the Crocodiles. Following the festival, The Wide Mouthed Frogs disbanded. In April 1980 The Crocodiles released their debut album Tears which, along with its lead single "Tears" reached No. 17 on the Recording Industry Association of New Zealand charts. In 1980 The Crocodiles won 'Best Group' and 'Most Promising Group' at the New Zealand Music Awards.

Matthews began her puppet making career in 1979, working on Summer City, a community arts project run by Graeme Nesbitt for the QE II Arts Council in New Zealand. In 1982 Matthews moved to Sydney, where she worked with master puppet makers Ross Hill, Beverley Campbell-Jackson and Peter Chester and director Richard Bradshaw at the Marionette Theatre of Australia. During the 1980s Matthews honed her skills by working on the Jim Henson movie Labyrinth, starring David Bowie. She later worked with designer Garth Frost to fabricate the puppets for Australian ABC television programme The Ferals and produced puppets for the ABC's Bananas in Pyjamas and The Upside Down Show with The Umbilical Brothers.

Matthews' first book, Out of the Egg, was published in Australia and New Zealand by Walker Books Australia and in the US by Houghton Mifflin Company in 2007. It is illustrated with Japanese woodblock prints. Out of the Egg is recommended in Walter E. Sawyer's Growing Up With Literature.

Out of the Egg was nominated in the Picture Book section of the 2008 New Zealand Post Book Awards for Children and Young Adults and won the award for Best First Book.

Waiting for Later was published by Walker Books Australia in 2011. It is about a young girl growing up over an autumn afternoon and the strongest themes are family, love of nature and independence. Waiting for Later is illustrated with wood block and stencil prints. It was shortlisted for the 2011 QLD Premier's Literary Awards, the NZ Post Book Awards for Children and Young Adults and the LIANZA Russell Clark award for illustration.

Matthews' picture book, A Great Cake is about imaginative play and home cooking. It is illustrated with stencils and woodblock prints and published by Walker Books Australia. A Great Cake was shorted listed for the 2013 NZ Post Book Awards for Children and Young Adults and won the LIANZA Russell Clark Award for illustration.

So Many Wonderfuls, a picture book for the young and old, was published by Walker Books Australia in 2014.

In 2017 Matthews self published Do What You're Doing, a read aloud, sing along story for the classroom, library or home about the perils of digital distraction and compulsive multi-tasking and the pleasures of giving something your undivided attention. It has been turned into a song by the Eeore Chanticleers.

In 1993 Tina Matthews self-published the Black and White Baby Mobile for newborn babies. It has sold over 40,000 copies and continues to be manufactured in New Zealand and Australia, distributed from Matthews' studio and sold in shops throughout Australia and New Zealand.

As well as creating picture books Matthews has taught puppetry at the National Institute of Dramatic Art in Sydney for many years. She was writer and illustrator in residence at the University of New England, Armidale during May 2014.

In 2018 Matthews published HOME, a frieze/book based on an Emily Dickinson poem.

== Bibliography ==
- Matthews, Tina; Gray, Wendy; Witt, David; Frost, Garth (1996). The Ferals Fantastic Fanbook. Sydney, Australia: ABC Books. ISBN 978-0-7333-0471-2.
- Matthews, Tina (2007). Out of the Egg. Newtown, NSW: Walker Books Australia. ISBN 978-1-921150-35-7.
- Matthews, Tina (2011). Waiting For Later. Newtown, NSW: Walker Books Australia. ISBN 978-1-921150-35-7.
- Matthews, Tina (2012). A Great Cake. Newtown, NSW: Walker Books Australia. ISBN 978-1-921720-06-2.
- Matthews, Tina (2014). So Many Wonderfuls. Newtown, NSW: Walker Books Australia. ISBN 978-1-922077-51-6.
- Matthews, Tina (2017). Do What You're Doing. Bondi, NSW: Tina Matthews. ISBN 978-0-648086-78-9.
