= In Too Deep (Jenny Morris song) =

1995 single by Jenny Morris

Single by Jenny Morris

from the album Salvation Jane
- Released: 7 August 1995
- Length: 4:42
- Label: rooArt
- Songwriter: Rick Nowels
- Producer: Andrew Farriss

Jenny Morris singles chronology
"Rhythm & Flow" (1995)	"In Too Deep" (1995)	"What Do I Do Know" (1995)

"In Too Deep" is a song written by Rick Nowels and produced by Andrew Farriss for Jenny Morris's fourth studio album Salvation Jane (1995). It was released as the album's fourth single but was not successful, peaking at number 143 on the Australian ARIA Singles Chart.

== Belinda Carlisle version ==
"In Too Deep"

Single by Belinda Carlisle

from the album A Woman & a Man
- B-side: "I See No Ships"
- Released: 1 July 1996
- Length: 4:05
- Label: Chrysalis
- Songwriter: Rick Nowels
- Producer: David Tickle

Belinda Carlisle singles chronology
"Lay Down Your Arms" (1993)	"In Too Deep" (1996)	"Always Breaking My Heart" (1996)

Music video
- "In Too Deep" on YouTube

American singer Belinda Carlisle covered "In Too Deep" for her sixth studio album, A Woman & a Man (1996). Her version, produced by David Tickle, charted at number six in the United Kingdom, number 10 in Hungary, and number 11 in Australia; in the latter country, the song is certified gold by the Australian Recording Industry Association (ARIA).

=== Critical reception ===
British magazine Music Week rated the song three out of five, adding, "Same formula and very likely the same success for Carlisle. Radio is already picking up on this Rick Nowels-penned track."

=== Music video ===
The accompanying music video was directed by David Nelson. It shows Belinda in Italy, dancing in the fountain, and a man in the bathroom, presumably her ex-boyfriend. It shows her and the man at the pool, with Belinda wearing a blue jacket at one scene. At the end of the music video, she and the man kisses as the crowd of spectators watch.

=== Track listings ===
- UK, Australian, and Japanese CD single
1. "In Too Deep" (single edit)
2. "I See No Ships"
3. "Jealous Guy"
4. "(We Want) the Same Thing"
- UK 7-inch picture disc and cassette single
1. "In Too Deep"
2. "(We Want) the Same Thing"

=== Charts ===
==== Weekly charts ====
Chart (1996)	Peak position
Australia (ARIA)	11
Estonia (Eesti Top 20)	3
Europe (Eurochart Hot 100)	33
European Airplay (European Hit Radio)	14
Hungary (Mahasz)	10
Iceland (Íslenski Listinn Topp 40)	24
Israel (Israeli Singles Chart)	4
Scottish Singles Sales (Official Charts)	6
Sweden (Sverigetopplistan)	59
UK Singles (Official Charts)	6
UK Airplay (Music Week)	4

==== Year-end charts ====
Chart (1996)	Position
Australia (ARIA)	70

=== Certifications ===
Region	Certification	Certified units/sales
Australia (ARIA)	Gold	35,000^{^}
^{^} Shipments figures based on certification alone.

=== Release history ===
Region	Date	Format(s)	Label(s)	Ref.
United Kingdom	1 July 1996	7-inch vinyl; CD; cassette	Chrysalis	
Japan	4 September 1996	CD	Chrysalis	
