= Lighthearted =

- CD single cover

Single by Jenny Morris

from the album Body and Soul
- A-side: "Lighthearted"
- B-side: "Are You Ready?"
- Released: 26 October 1987
- Genre: Pop/Rock
- Label: WEA
- Songwriter(s): Jenny Morris
- Producer(s): Mark Moffatt

Jenny Morris singles chronology
"You I Know" (1987)	"Lighthearted" (1987)	"Saved Me" (1989)

"Lighthearted" is a song by New Zealand musician, Jenny Morris. It was released in October 1987 the fourth and final single from her debut studio album, Body and Soul (1987).

== Track listings ==
CD Single/ 7" (WEA – 7-258170)

1. "Lighthearted" – 4:25
2. "Are You Ready?" – 4:48

12" Single/ (WEA – 0-258170)

1. "Lighthearted" (extended Peewee Ferris remix) – 7:28
2. "Are You Ready?" (Peewee Ferris extended) – 4:48
3. "Are You Ready?"(Lighthearted Remix) – 5:50

== Charts ==
=== Weekly charts ===
Chart (1987)	Peak position
Australia (Kent Music Report)	70
New Zealand (RMNZ)	30
