= Hit & Myth =

Studio album by Jenny Morris
- Released: August 2002
- Genre: Pop
- Label: Yep! Records
- Producers: Jenny Morris, Nick Wales

Jenny Morris chronology
Salvation Jane (1995)	Hit & Myth (2002)	Listen: The Very Best of Jenny Morris (2004)

Singles from Hit & Myth
- 1. "Home" Released: 29 October 2001; 2. "Downtime" Released: 15 July 2002

Hit & Myth is the fifth studio album by New Zealand singer Jenny Morris, released in August 2002, by Yep! Records, seven years since the release of her last album, Salvation Jane. Yep! was a new independent record label established by Warren Fahey, who founded Larrikin Records. The album was co-produced by Nick Wales (CODA), was released on 8 May 2002 by Yep! Records. The album features classical musicians (Renaissance Players, Winsome Evans), pop musicians (Davey Lane, Jodi Phillis (ex Clouds)) and jazz (PROP) musicians.

I had people playing on the album from different backgrounds– classical musicians, programmers, jazz musicians, pop. The songs have been crafted so long and so hard, they’re not throw away but they’re not inaccessible. It’s lush, lots of strings beautifully arranged and then groove and beats and really modern sounds and classical guitars as well. It’s a collage of all my influences really.

— Jenny Morris

We really went for a different set of instruments right across the album. We've got Renaissance instruments, antique 'analoguey' keyboards. Nick Wales [the album's producer] is a viola player, so he had access to string players who have worked together a lot, so I am really pleased with the strings. There's so many layers. That's what I like - an album that you don't necessarily get the first time.

— Jenny Morris

Morris wrote or co-wrote nine of the eleven songs on the album, the others, "Guiding Star", was written by Neil Finn and "The Blacksmith" is a traditional folk song. "The Blacksmith", according to the album liner notes, was the first song Morris learnt on the guitar and "an integral part of my writing influences ever since", whilst Morris attributes inspiration for the song "The Sculptor" to the 13th-century Islamic poet Jalaluddin Rumi.

The music video for "Downtime" featured a number of well-known Australian actors, including Hugo Weaving, Bryan Brown, Matt Newton and Peter Fenton, miming the words to the song.

Neither the album nor the singles "Home", released 29 October 2001, and "Downtime", released 15 July 2002, managed to chart.

== Track listing ==
1. "Downtime" (Jenny Morris, Nick Wales, S. Peach) - 4:21
2. "Home" (Jenny Morris) - 4:15
3. "Killer Man" (Jenny Morris, Andrew Farriss, T. Van Der Kuil) - 4:09
4. "I Climb High" (Jenny Morris) - 4:39
5. "Into the Water" (Jenny Morris, Tim Wedde) - 5:10
6. "The Blacksmith" (Traditional) - 3:41
7. "Its Happened Again" (Jenny Morris, Davey Lane) - 5;04
8. "Dressing Gown" (Jenny Morris) - 4:04
9. "Guiding Star" (Neil Finn) - 4:42
10. "The Sculptor" (Jenny Morris, Nick Wales) - 4:26
11. "Wailing Wall" (Jenny Morris) - 7:27

== Personnel ==
- Winsome Evans —
- Lew Kiek —
- Davey Lane — guitar, vocals
- Jodi Phillis — guitar, vocals
- Nick Wales — viola
- Tim Wedde — keyboards
