= Honeychild =

Studio album by Jenny Morris
- Released: 14 October 1991
- Genre: Pop, dance
- Label: East West Records
- Producer: Mark Forrester, Nick Launay, Jenny Morris

Jenny Morris chronology
Shiver (1989)	Honeychild (1991)	The Best of Jenny Morris: The Story So Far (1992)

Singles from Honeychild
- 1. "Break in the Weather" Released: September 1991; 2. "I've Had You" Released: November 1991; 3. "Zero" Released: 1992; 4. "Crackerjack Man" Released: 1992

Professional ratings
Review scores
Source	Rating
AllMusic	link

Honeychild is the third solo studio album by New Zealand singer Jenny Morris, released in October 1991 by East West Records. The album went for the same style as Morris's other two albums' acoustic pop, with a hint of dance music, and was produced by Nick Launay, with some songs co-produced by Mark Forrester. The album included a cover version of the song "Tempted" by the English band Squeeze.

Honeychild was Morris's second most successful album, after Shiver, peaking at #5 in Australia, and being accredited platinum by ARIA. Morris also received a nomination in the "Best Female Artist" category at the 1992 ARIA Music Awards.

"Break in the Weather", the first single released from the album in September 1991, became Morris's highest-charting single in Australia, peaking at #2. It also peaked at #5 in New Zealand. "I've Had You", released in November 1991, fared less well on the charts, peaking at #39 in both Australia and New Zealand. "Zero", the third single from the album, peaked at #33 in New Zealand, and number #89 in Australia. The final single released from the album, "Crackerjack Man", failed to chart.

== Track listing ==
No.	Title	Writer(s)	Length
1.	"Break in the Weather"	Jenny Morris, Tam Morris	4:29
2.	"Zero"	Andrew Farriss, J. Morris	4:32
3.	"Mercy"	A. Farriss, J. Morris	5:12
4.	"I've Had You"	Paul Kelly, J. Morris	5:14
5.	"Lost in Heaven""	J. Morris	4:57
6.	"Tempted"	Chris Difford, Glenn Tilbrook	4:16
7.	"Crackerjack Man"	A. Farriss, J. Morris	3:41
8.	"Action"	Don Miller-Robinson	4:38
9.	"Tall Poppies"	A. Farriss, J. Morris	2:52
10.	"There for You"	J. Morris	4:59
11.	"Tangled in Love"	A. Farriss, J. Morris	4:50
12.	"Near"	Dave Dobbyn, J. Morris	4:33
Total length:			54:13

== Charts ==
=== Weekly charts ===
Chart (1991)	Peak position
Australian Albums (ARIA)	5
New Zealand Albums (RMNZ)	5

=== Year-end charts ===
Chart (1991)	Peak position
Australia (ARIA)	93

== Certifications ==
Region	Certification	Certified units/sales
Australia (ARIA)	Platinum	70,000^{^}
New Zealand (RMNZ)	Gold	7,500^{^}
^{^} Shipments figures based on certification alone.

== Personnel ==
=== Musicians ===
- Mike Bukovsky - horns (tracks: 2, 5)
- Ashley Cadell - keyboards (tracks: 1 to 3, 6, 8, 10, 12)
- Dave Dobbyn - vocals (tracks: 1, 8)
- Sly Dunbar - drums (tracks: 1–3, 5, 6, 8, 10, 11)
- Andrew Farriss - guitar, keyboards (tracks: 1, 2, 3, 9, 10)
- Ricky Fataar - vocals (tracks: 1, 8)
- Chris Green - horns (tracks: 2, 5)
- James Green - horns (tracks: 2, 5)
- Chong Lim - keyboards (tracks: 9, 12)
- Roger Mason - keyboards (tracks: 4, 7, 12)
- Don Miller-Robinson - guitar, keyboards (tracks: 1, 2, 3, 4, 5, 6, 7, 8, 10, 11)
- Jenny Morris - vocals
- Victor Rounds - bass guitar (tracks: 4, 12)
- Robbie Shakespeare - bass guitar (tracks: 1–3, 5, 6, 8, 10, 11)
- Sunil de Silva - percussion (tracks: 1–8, 10–12)
- James Valentine - horns (tracks: 2, 5)
- Wendy Matthews - vocals (tracks: 8, 10)

=== Production ===
- Art direction - Cheryl Collins
- Photography - Grant Matthews, Stephen Price
- Producer - Jenny Morris (tracks: 4, 7, 9, 12)
- Producer, sound engineer, mixer - Mark Forrester (tracks: 4, 7, 9, 12), Nick Launay (tracks: 1–3, 5, 6, 8, 10, 11)
