= The Umbrellas (jazz ensemble) =

- Origin: Australia
- Genres: Jazz
- Years active: 1985–present
- Members: Peter Dasent, James Greening, Andrew Robson, Andrew "Wilks" Wilkie, Zoe Hauptmann, Steve Elphick, Toby Hall

The Umbrellas are an Australian jazz ensemble formed in 1985 to play Peter Dasent's compositions. The group has published five full-length albums. All are still available, the first four as rereleases.

Sydney, Australia based, the group's style has been described as unpredictable, quirky, surreal, and influenced by Italian film music. The band members improvise in order to flesh out the characters in each composition's "play".

The Italian connection is reinforced by the Bravo Nino Rota tribute album and by founder Dasent himself. As he states in a Jazz Australia interview, "In 1976 my local cinema, in a moment of inspired programming unusual in Wellington, New Zealand, at the time, took to screening Fellini films on Sunday nights. I would watch these amazing creations, and then find myself singing the theme music all the way home. When I moved to Sydney in 1981 I heard Hal Wilner’s wonderful tribute album Amarcord Nino Rota, with the sublime piano solos by Jaki Byard, Bill Frisell’s interpretation of “Juliet Of The Spirits” (actually his first recordings) and of course Carla Bley’s arrangement of 8 1/2. By then I’d realised I was listening to music that I would live with for the rest of my life."

== Instruments ==
- James Greening, trombone
- Andrew Robson, saxophone
- Zoe Hauptmann, bassist
- Toby Hall, drummer and vibes
- Ian Wilkie, marimba

== Discography ==
=== Albums ===
List of albums, with selected details
Title	Details
The Umbrellas	Released: 1986; Format: LP, Cassette; Label: Sound Of Music (SOM 1001)
Age of Elegance	Released: 1990; Format: CD; Label: Sound Of Music (SOM 1002)
Soundtrack to the Passing Parade	Released: 1992; Format: CD; Label: Jarra Hill Records (CDJHR2019)
Bravo Nino Rota	Released: 2001; Format: CD
ounge Suite Tango	Released: 2015; Format: CD, digital

== Awards and nominations ==
=== ARIA Music Awards ===
The ARIA Music Awards is an annual awards ceremony that recognises excellence, innovation, and achievement across all genres of Australian music. They commenced in 1987.

Year	Nominee / work	Award	Result	Ref.
2002	Bravo Nino Rota	Best Jazz Album	Nominated	
