= Tony Backhouse =

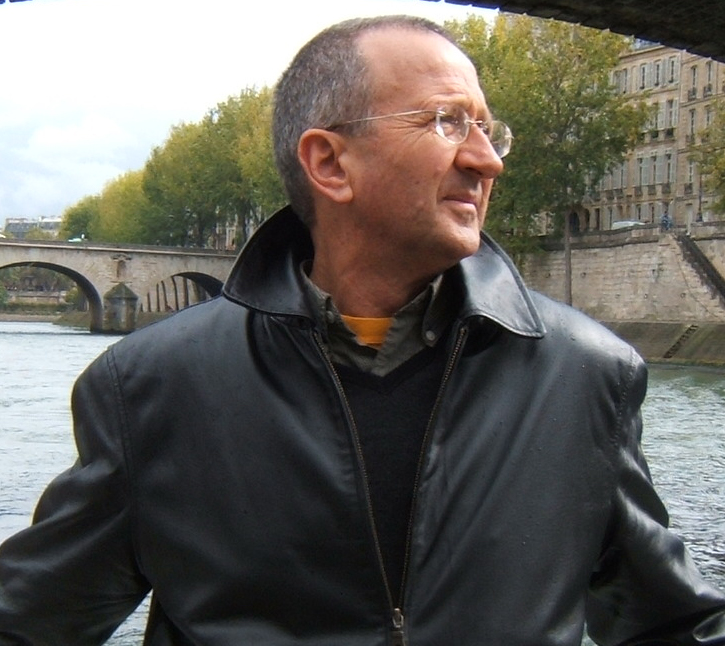
- Backhouse in 2009

Background information
- Born: 1947 (age 78–79)
- Origin: New Zealand
- Years active: 1971–present
- Formerly of: The Crocodiles; The Café of the Gate of Salvation

Tony Backhouse (born 1947) is a singer, musician and composer from New Zealand and is a key player in the Australasian a cappella movement. He played in New Zealand bands such as the Crocodiles, and formed Australian a cappella groups, the Elevators, the Cafe of the Gate of Salvation, the Honeybees and the Heavenly Light Quartet. Currently he lives in Sydney and works as a singer, composer, author and workshop leader, in the areas of vocal arranging and gospel music. He composes and arranges mainly for a cappella choirs, always with an ear to vernacular traditions – contemporary funk, African choirs, gospel – and to anything polyphonic. Works that typify his style are Jubilation and (I've Been Given) Two Wing as sung by the Café of the Gate of Salvation.

== Education and bands 1965—1985 ==
Backhouse completed a B.A. (English), and B.Mus. (Composition) at Victoria University of Wellington, New Zealand, in 1970, under the tutorship of composers David Farquhar and Jenny McLeod. He later completed a graduate course in ethnomusicology (focusing on blues and gospel) at University of Memphis, USA, with Professor David Evans.

In the early seventies, Backhouse composed and performed music for NZ radio, theatre, the NZ Film Unit, experimental performances and rock operas, but most of his energies were spent in NZ funk/soul/pop bands, including Mammal, Spats, Rough Justice and the Crocodiles (which won three Recording Industry Awards in 1980).

Relocating to Australia in 1981, and following the demise of the Crocodiles, Backhouse formed his own band, Vulgar Beatmen (with ex-Crocodile Jonathan Zwartz and ex-Rough Justice members Peter Boyd and Mike Gubb) and sang and/or played guitar with Renée Geyer, Joe Walsh, Jenny Morris, Jackie Orszaszcky, the Dan Johnson Band and others. He has arranged and recorded backing vocals for Dave Dobbyn, Tim Finn, Vince Jones, Justine Clarke, Kate Ceberano, Andy Anderson, Canadian bluesman Harry Manx, Dutch singer Pieter Bon, and the Umbrellas.

Backhouse's songs have been recorded by Jenny Morris, Renée Geyer and others, and he has contributed to film soundtracks including Sweetie (Jane Campion), Rodney & Juliet (Fane Flaws) and Braindead (Peter Jackson).

== A cappella & gospel ==
In the mid-eighties, after the Vulgar Beatmen broke up, Backhouse began to research African American a cappella sacred music traditions, and became increasingly involved in community music, choral directing and running vocal workshops. He founded the a cappella quartet the Elevators, a cappella gospel choirs the Café of the Gate of Salvation and the Honeybees and a cappella quartet the Heavenly Light Quartet.

Backhouse has received awards from the Contemporary A Cappella Society of America and composer commissions from The Song Company and the Australia Council. In 1990 he received an Australia Council International Study Grant to research Black gospel traditions at Memphis State University. In 2006, his song Lost in the Heavenly Light was nominated for the Australian Classical Music Awards for Vocal Work of the Year.

Since 1987, Backhouse has been running vocal workshops throughout Australia and New Zealand, (including schools, universities, WOMAD and other festivals) and internationally in Canada (West Coast Sacred Music Festival), Samoa, Fiji, France, Italy, Morocco and the UK, and has been a solo performer at festivals throughout Australia. He has been the longest-running tutor at the adult music camp Summersong (NSW) since the camp began in 2000.

He has published two African American gospel songbooks 'A cappella – Rehearsing For Heaven' (1995; accompanying double CD, 2003) and 'Move on Up' (2005), a book on directing vocal groups, 'Freeing the song' (2010), and a songbook of his original choral compositions 'In The Spirit' (2020).

== 2008 to present ==
Tony left the Cafe of the Gate of Salvation when he moved back to New Zealand in 2008. He continued to travel extensively, running workshops worldwide. He formed the Napier Gospel Choir in 2013, and sporadically contributed guitar and bass to gigs and recordings with Blessed Relief (Sydney), No Engine (Napier, NZ) and the Bend (NZ).

He moved back to Australia in 2018, and returned to the Cafe of the Gate of Salvation as their artistic director in 2022. His current activities include running workshops in a cappella traditions, composing and arranging for vocal ensembles and choirs, and singing with the Heavenly Light Quartet.

He continues to record original music with long-time colleague Peter Dasent; as Blessed Relief they released an album of original songs in 2017, Design For Living. The Bend's album We Disappear, poems by Sam Hunt set to music by Fane Flaws, Tony Backhouse and Peter Dasent, was released in 2021.With Peter, Tony continues to honour the memory of their late colleague (and inspiration) Fane Flaws by working towards the completion of the Bend's vast catalogue of unreleased tracks, all recorded over a period of 20 or so years.

Tony's album of experimental music (largely instrumental, electronic and percussive) The Disturbing Hedge was released in 2020.

== Recordings ==
- Beware The Man – Sam Hunt & Mammal (1974)
- Tears – The Crocodiles (1980)
- Looking at Ourselves – The Crocodiles (1981)
- The Café of the Gate of Salvation (1991)
- A Window in Heaven – The Café of the Gate of Salvation (1994)
- The Heavenly Light Quartet - The Heavenly Light Quartet (1997)
- Guided Meditations - Stephanie Dowrick & Tony Backhouse (2000)
- Rehearsing For Heaven (gospel anthology & tutorial) (2003)
- Deluxe -The Café of the Gate of Salvation (2004)
- Design For Living - Blessed Relief (2017)
- The Disturbing Hedge - Tony Backhouse (aka Van De Miért) (2020)
- Dig A Little Deeper - The Heavenly Light Quartet (2020)
- We Disappear - the Bend (2021)
- I Heard The Angels Singing - Tony Backhouse (2026)
- Distopiary - Tony Backhouse (aka Van De Miért) (2026)
