= Private Lives (band) =

British pop-music group

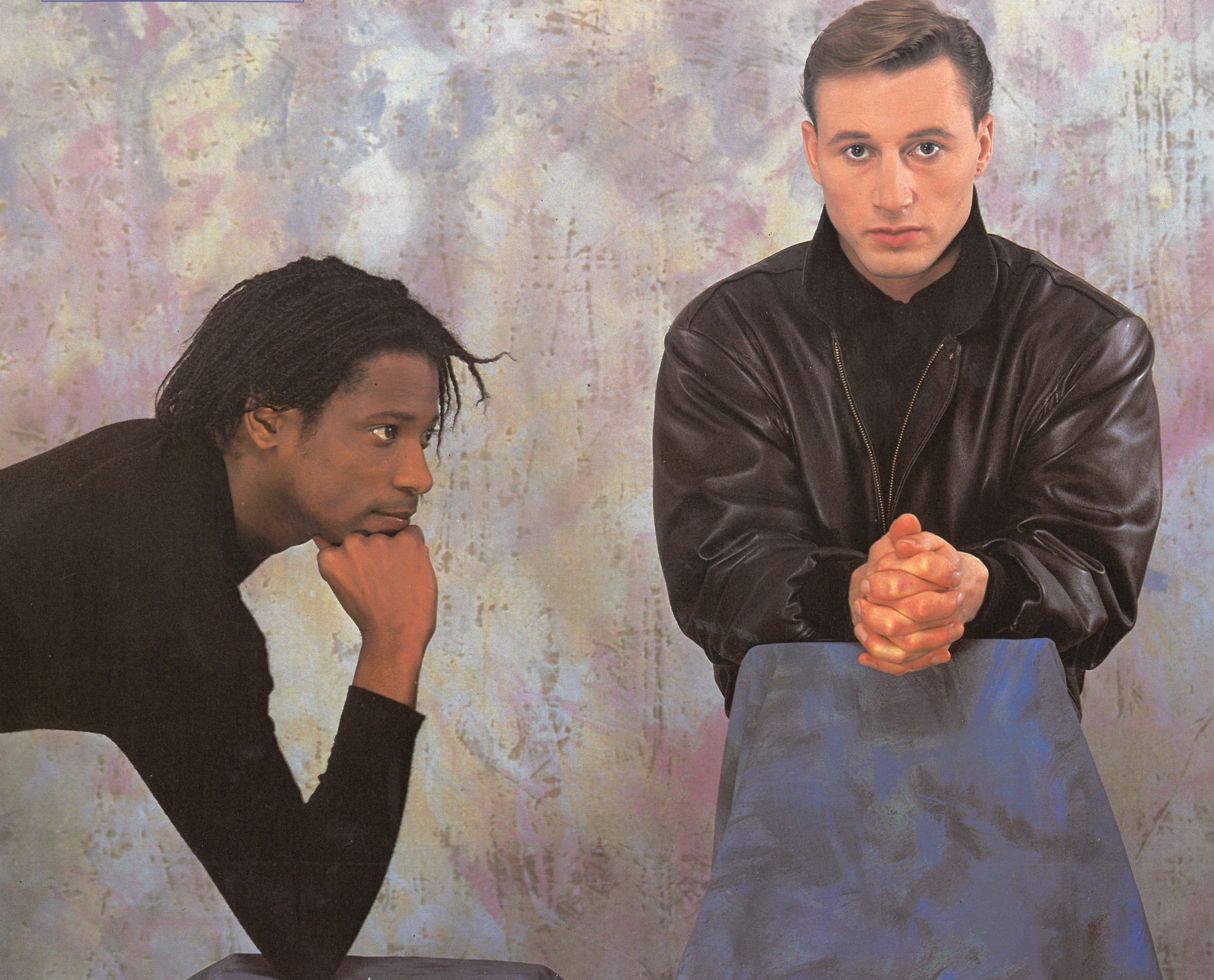
Morris Michael and John Adams of Private Lives

Private Lives were a British new wave band, active in the early to mid-1980s, who are best known for their 1984 charting single, "Living in a World (Turned Upside Down)".

== Biography ==
The band formed in 1980. At its core was vocalist and songwriter John Adams, accompanied by Rick Lane on keyboards and John Read on bass. The band's debut single, "Where Do I Go", was released by WEA on 1 August 1980. The song was written by Adams and Lane and produced by Adams and David Moore.

The band signed to the Chrysalis Records label, releasing a single, "Because You're Young", on 12 March 1982. It featured Adams on vocals, Lane on keyboards, Read on bass, Steve Harvey on drums and Bobby Valentino on violin, with guest appearances by Gary Barnacle on saxophone and Paul Harvey on guitar. The song was written by Adams and Lane and produced by Adams and Martin Rushent. The band's third single, "Memory of Your Name", also on Chrysalis was released on 13 August 1982. The lineup on the single featured Adams on vocals and drums, Read on bass and Lane on keyboards, with guest appearances by Simon Climie on guitar and Guy Baker on bass. It was produced by Tony Visconti. The band gathered a strong live following, but poor record sales led to them being dropped by the label and the band breaking up.

Private Lives re-emerged, this time as a duo with Adams on vocals and Morris Michael on guitar; though Lane was no longer in the band, he continued to co-write most of the band's material with Adams. The group signed with EMI Records and released a single, "Break the Chains", in September 1983. The song was written by Adams and Lane and produced by Peter Wade Schwier. The next single, "Living in a World (Turned Upside Down)", was released in January 1984. It was written by Adams and produced by Adams and Schwier. The single peaked at No. 53 on the UK Singles Chart in February of that year, remaining in the top 100 for five weeks. The success of the single was helped by a support slot on Hall and Oates' tour of the United Kingdom. The subsequent single, "From a River to a Sea", was released in May 1984 but failed to chart. "Living in a World (Turned Upside Down)" was re-recorded, remixed and re-released in October 1984.

Their debut album, Prejudice and Pride, was released by EMI Records in 1984. Among the backing musicians on the band's album were Kajagoogoo bassist Nick Beggs, English singer Kiki Dee and Ricky Wilde.

In 1985, Adams released his debut solo single, "Through the Eyes of Love", which was produced and co-written by Andy Taylor (Duran Duran). He then went onto release a solo album, Strong, on A&M Records in 1987, with one single, "Strip this Heart". All three failed to chart.

In 2016, Lost 80s Records re-released a remastered limited edition of Prejudice and Pride, which included six additional tracks, comprising the band's previous three singles and B-sides.

Though the band are not too well known in their native country, AllMusic music critic Michael Sutton claims that "Living in a World" enjoyed popularity as a turntable hit in Manila, Philippines, and is still played on the radio.

== Discography ==
=== Albums ===
- Prejudice and Pride - EMI Records (EJ 24 0136 1) (1984)

=== Singles ===
- "Where Do I Go" - WEA (K 18303) (1 August 1980)
- "Because You're Young" - Chrysalis (CHS 2564) (12 March 1982)
- "Memory of Your Name" - Chrysalis (CHS 2628) (13 August 1982)
- "Break the Chains" - EMI Records (PRIV 1) (September 1983)
- "Living in a World (Turned Upside Down)" - EMI Records (PRIV 2) (16 January 1984) - UK #53
- "From a River to a Sea" - EMI Records (PRIV 3) (May 1984)
