= Fane Flaws =

New Zealand musician and music video director (1951–2021)

Fane Michael Flaws (16 May 1951 – 17 June 2021) was a New Zealand musician, songwriter, director and artist.

== Career ==
Flaws was a member of bands including Blerta, Spats, and The Crocodiles. Until joining Blerta he was known by his second name Michael: Bruno Lawrence of Blerta insisted Fane was a better name.

When he was in The Crocodiles, he wrote the song "Tears" with Arthur Baysting. The single reached number 17 in the New Zealand charts.

He wrote songs for the films Braindead and Meet the Feebles, even voicing the Musician Frog in the latter.

He animated the revamped titles for Radio with Pictures in 1986, a Television New Zealand programme featuring popular and alternative music.

He was co-author, with Arthur Baysting and Peter Dasent, of the children's book The Underwater Melon Man and Other Unreasonable Rhymes. The book was published in 1998, a CD in 1999. In 2011, an edition was published with a DVD. Musicians appearing include Chris Knox, Jenny Morris, Neil Finn, Tim Finn, Renée Geyer, Tony Backhouse, Bic Runga and Boh Runga, the Topp Twins, Che Fu & King Kapisi and Dave Dobbyn.

He also designed rugs, paints and created assemblage art works from found objects such as demolition timber and building fittings.

== Short film ==
- Rodney and Juliet (1990)

== Music videos ==
Directed unless otherwise noted

Year	Song	Artist
1979	Tears	The Crocodiles
1981	Proud	Dropbears
1981	Shall We Go	Dropbears
1981	Come on Over	Matt Finish
1981	My Heart's on Fire	Machinations
1981	Get Some Humour	Jenny Morris
1981	Life in Asia	I Am Joe's Music
1981	Talking 'bout the Fridge	I Am Joe's Music
1981	The Way You Get Your Way	I Am Joe's Music
1983	Beautiful Things	The Front Lawn
1985	Diamonds on China	The Narcs
1986	Injun Joe	The Johnnys
1988	Sweet Lovers	Holidaymakers
1989	Parihaka	Tim Finn
1992	Dominion Road Director and Editor	The Mutton Birds
1992	Nature	The Mutton Birds
1993	Giant Friend	The Mutton Birds
1994	The Heater	The Mutton Birds
1994	In My Room directed by Leon Narbey, recut by Fane Flaws.	The Mutton Birds
1995	Anchor Me	The Mutton Birds
1995	Naked Flame	Dave Dobbyn
1999	Can You Hear Us	Neil Finn

== Awards ==
- Best Video at the New Zealand Music Awards, 1985 for The Narcs: Diamonds on China
- Best Video at the New Zealand Music Awards, 1988 for Holidaymakers: Sweet Lovers
- Best First Film at Clermont Ferrand Film Festival for Rodney and Juliet
- Best TV Graphics, 1989 NZ LIFTA Awards for Radio with Pictures

== Commercials ==
- Lemon & Paeroa soft drink. (1991)
- McDonald's (1991)
- New Zealand Police – community service commercial on babysitting. (1981)
- NZ Post (1991)
- Rexona Dry Solid anti perspirant (1990)

== Death ==
Flaws died on 17 June 2021, aged 70.
