= Salvation Jane (album) =

Studio album by Jenny Morris
- Released: 10 July 1995
- Genre: Pop
- Length: 59:28
- Label: rooArt
- Producers: Andrew Farriss, Mark Moffatt

Jenny Morris chronology
The Best of Jenny Morris: The Story So Far (1992)	Salvation Jane (1995)	Hit & Myth (2002)

Singles from Salvation Jane
- 1. "The Price I Pay" Released: 1993; 2. "Only We Can Hear" Released: 1994; 3. "Rhythm & Flow" Released: 1995; 4. "In Too Deep" Released: 1995; 5. "What Do I Do Now" Released: 1996

Salvation Jane is the fourth studio album by New Zealand singer Jenny Morris. It was released in July 1995 on the rooArt label, after a four-year gap from her last album. The album was produced by Andrew Farriss and Mark Moffatt, together with Electric Hippies' duo Steve Balbi and Justin Stanley. The album featured songs from a songwriting retreat held at Miles Copeland's castle, Chateau de Marouatte, in Bordeaux, France. Here, Morris co-wrote a number of songs with other international songwriters, including Jud Friedman, Rich Wayland, Mark Cawley and Dennis Greaves.

The album peaked at #70 upon its debut on the Australian ARIA album charts on the week ending 23 July 1995, and spent two weeks in the top 100.

"Salvation Jane" is one of several names by which the flowering plant Echium plantagineum is known in Australia.

== Track listing ==
1. "Rhythm and Flow" (Jenny Morris) – 5:37
2. "Cry and Cry" (Don Miller-Robinson, Jenny Morris) – 3:45
3. "What Do I Do Now" (Mark Forrester, Jenny Morris) – 4:47
4. "In Too Deep" (Rick Nowels) – 4:42
5. "Walking into Walls" (J. Friedman, Jenny Morris) – 4:03
6. "Frida" (Jenny Morris) – 4:01
7. "Hope (Now I Know)" (Dennis Greaves, Jenny Morris) – 2:59
8. "Price I Pay" (Billy Bragg) – 3:44
9. "Only We Can Hear" (Jenny Morris, Wally Wilson) – 4:08
10. "Digger" (Bill Baker, Mark Cawley, Jenny Morris) – 4:11
11. "Angels" (Jenny Morris) – 3:46
12. "Pain in Your Shadow" (Jenny Morris, Rich Wayland, Simon Wilson) – 4:50
13. "Salvation Jane" (Andrew Farriss) – 3:19

== Charts ==
Chart performance for Salvation Jane
Chart (1995)	Peak position
Australian Albums (ARIA)	70
