= Arthur Baysting =

New Zealand writer (1947–2019)

Arthur Baysting (17 April 1947 – 3 December 2019) was a New Zealand writer, producer and children's advocate. He lived in Auckland with his partner, artist Jean Clarkson. They had two grown children.

== Early career ==
Baysting was born in Blenheim, and grew up in Nelson. From the 1990s onward, Baysting became well known for his advocacy of New Zealand music. Before this he worked as a journalist, scriptwriter and stand-up comedian.

In Australia, his children's songs, co-written with Peter Dasent, have become popular through the ABC show Play School and recordings by the singer and its host Justine Clarke.

Early in his writing career, Baysting was a journalist with the magazine NZ Listener and published Young New Zealand Poets (1973), an anthology of poetry.

In 1977, Baysting (with Ian Mune) wrote the screenplay for Roger Donaldson's feature film Sleeping Dogs, a film credited with kick-starting the modern NZ film industry. He also collaborated with Donaldson on the series, Winners and Losers, and with Mune, on the children's television serial, The Mad Dog Gang.

== Career ==
=== 1970s–1980s ===
Baysting and his partner became members of the alternative theatre group Red Mole for their seven-month season at Wellington's Carmen's Balcony. Baysting was the cabaret's MC and his character, Neville Purvis, became one of New Zealand's early stand-up comedians. Purvis later starred in his own television series, The Neville Purvis Family Show.

This ended controversially in 1979 with Purvis apologising for the bad language in the series and adding, "at least we never said f**k," thereby becoming the first person to say the forbidden word on NZ television. Following complaints to the police, and media publicity around this event, free-lance work was scarce, and in 1980 Baysting and Clarkson moved to Sydney. While in Australia he was signed to Mushroom Music Publishing, later shifting administration of his repertoire to Origin Music.

The couple moved back to NZ in 1985 where Baysting wrote scripts for the production company The Gibson Group, including the satirical sketch series Public Eye and the tele-feature Undercover (featuring a very young Cliff Curtis). He contributed to the soundtrack of Peter Jackson's feature Meet The Feebles (1989).

He worked for several years at the Auckland Medical School, with Action on Smoking and Health (ASH) and through this met Labour back-bencher Helen Clark and became her electorate press secretary. Later (with Dyan Campbell and Margaret Dagg) he edited Making Policy Not Tea (Oxford University Press), a book of interviews with women MPs.

=== 1990s ===
For two years in the early 1990s, Baysting was President of the NZ Writers Guild and in 1992, he was elected NZ Writer/Director on the Board of the Australasian Performing Right Association (APRA), the body run by songwriters to license music and distribute music royalties.

Over the next 18 years, as APRA director, Baysting became involved in a number of cultural initiatives, notably the Green Ribbon campaign. This brought together industry groups such as SPADA, APRA, the Writers Guild, the Director's Guild, WIFT, the Technicians Guild and others to collectively lobby politicians for better access for NZ programming. The 1999 Endangered Species conference bought in experts from Ireland and Australia and put the issue of local radio and television content on to the political agenda.

Green Ribbon lobbied for more local content on television, for a 20% quota for NZ music on commercial radio, for a Music Commission and for a non-commercial national radio network for young people. They were successful with the first three objectives (although the 20% music quota is a "voluntary target"). The youth radio initiative was vigorously opposed by commercial radio and never eventuated.

=== 2000s ===
In 2001, for his work with the Green Ribbon campaign, Baysting received the inaugural SPADA/On Film Industry Champion award. The campaign found an ally in Helen Clark who went on to become the first NZ Prime Minister to hold the arts portfolio and who ushered in a remarkable period in New Zealand's cultural growth. In the same year Baysting and Mike Chunn produced the Nature's Best collection of the top 30 songs voted for by APRA members and other music luminaries. Released by Sony Music, it became the largest-selling NZ compilation and was followed by several successful follow-up releases.

In 2001 Baysting became co-director, with Cath Andersen, of the newly established Music Industry Commission. He later moved into the role of Project Director before leaving the NZMIC in 2006.

In 2008, Baysting and his family travelled to Tahiti, where his partner Jean Clarkson was part of a group exhibition by women descendants of the Tahitians who sailed to Pitcairn Island with the Bounty mutineers. He made a documentary of this Tahiti visit, called The 'Ahu Sistas, which told the women's side of this famous story. He also co-wrote songs with Pitcairn Islander Meralda Warren for the CD Pitcairn Island Songs.

In 2008, Baysting helped set up the annual APRA Children's Music Awards and in 2005/06 he was on the originating committee for the first New Zealand Ukulele Festival, now a popular annual event featuring over 3,000 young ukulele players.

=== 2010s ===
In 2012, Penguin/Viking Australia published the children's book The Gobbledygook is Eating a Book, written by Baysting and Justine Clarke. This was shortlisted for Best Children's Book in the Australian book awards and has since been translated and published in France.

Baysting became a respected songwriter working with many collaborators in a variety of genres. Artists who have recorded his songs include Al Hunter, Alex Papps, Anne Kirkpatrick, Bamboo, Beaver, Boh Runga, the Cafe at the Gate of Salvation, Che Fu, the Crocodiles, Chanelle Davis, Dragon, Fane Flaws, Forbidden Joe, Glenn Moffat, Hot Cafe, I Am Joe's Music, Jenny Morris (1980, "Tears"), King Kapisi, Kokomo, Linn Lorkin, the Living Hamsters, Marg Layton, Midge Marsden, Neville Purvis, Tony Backhouse and the Umbrellas. With his long-time collaborator Bill Lake he has written for the Pelicans and the Windy City Strugglers, Lake's country blues band, who have twice won Best Folk Album in the NZ music awards. Formed in 1968 the Strugglers were the subject of the 2008 Costa Botes documentary Struggle No More.

In 2011, he and Strugglers' bass player Nick Bollinger produced Shoebox Love Songs, a CD of traditional Rarotongan love songs by Will Crummer, featuring his daughter Annie. In 2013 and 2014 he was a part-time carer for his friend, stroke survivor Chris Knox.

At the 2013 Silver Scroll Awards, Lorde's producer and co-writer Joel Little paid tribute to Baysting for helping at various stages in his career beginning with a songwriting workshop at his school when Little was 10 years old.

In 2013, Justine Clarke's Little Day Out, featuring his songs, won Best Children's Album at the Australian ARIA music industry awards. In 2014 he received a platinum record for 70,000 sales of Clarke's CD I Like to Sing.

He was a full-time songwriter and often did group songwriting workshops and mentoring with teachers and young musicians.

In October 2018 he was presented with the Nostalgia Award from the Variety Artists Club of New Zealand for his contribution to New Zealand entertainment.

Baysting died on 3 December 2019 after a period of illness. He reportedly had continued to write songs until the end of his life.
