= Body and Soul (Jenny Morris album) =

Studio album by Jenny Morris
- Released: 27 July 1987
- Recorded: 1986–87 Sydney
- Genre: Pop
- Length: 42:45
- Label: Warner
- Producer: Andrew Farriss, Mark Moffatt

Jenny Morris chronology
Body and Soul (1987)	Shiver (1989)

Singles from Body and Soul
- 1. "You're Gonna Get Hurt" Released: September 1986; 2. "Body and Soul" Released: March 1987; 3. "You I Know" Released: July 1987; 4. "Lighthearted" Released: October 1987

Professional ratings
Review scores
Source	Rating
Allmusic	link

Body and Soul is the first solo studio album by New Zealand singer Jenny Morris, released in July 1987 by Warner Music Group. The album peaked at number 13 in Australia and 21 in New Zealand.

At the ARIA Music Awards of 1988, the album won Best Female Artist.

== Track listing ==
No.	Title	Writer(s)	Length
1.	"Body and Soul"	Jenny Morris	3:17
2.	"Rising Sun"	Steven Hufsteter, Tito Larriva, Tony Marsico, Chalo Quintana	3:22
3.	"You I Know"	Neil Finn	4:08
4.	"Lighthearted"	Morris	5:00
5.	"You're Gonna Get Hurt"	Andrew Farriss	3:38
6.	"Pass It Over"	Morris	3:25
7.	"Animal Magnetism"	Morris	3:50
8.	"Beating on the Same Drum"	Tim Finn	4:15
9.	"Tested Sentences"	Ian Belton, Fane Flaws, Morris	3:55
10.	"Trust Yourself"	Karen Steanis, Larry Van Kreig	4:21
11.	"Lighthearted" (Are You Ready mix)	Morris	3:07

== Personnel ==
- Bruce Allen – horn
- Garry Gary Beers – bass
- Ian Belton – bass
- John Bliss – drums
- Mike Bukovsky – horn
- Dave Dobbyn – backing vocals
- Andrew Farriss – guitar, keyboards, producer
- Ricky Fataar – drums
- Tim Finn – piano, vocals
- Wayne Goodwin – fiddle
- James Greening – horn
- Maggie McKinney – backing vocals
- Sam McNally – keyboards
- Mark Moffatt – electric and 12-string guitar, producer
- Jenny Morris – vocals, backing vocals
- Ian Moss – guitar, backing vocals
- Mark Meyer – drums
- Paul Panichi – trumpet
- Barton Price – drums
- Mark Punch – guitar, harmonica, backing vocals
- Andrew Reefman – drums
- Phil Small – bass
- Andrew Thompson – saxophone
- Amanda Vincent – organ, keyboards
- Mark Williams – backing vocals

== Charts ==
Chart (1987)	Peak position
Australian (Kent Music Report) Albums Chart	13
New Zealand Albums Chart	21

== Certifications ==
Region	Certification	Certified units/sales
Australia (ARIA)	Platinum	70,000^{^}
New Zealand (RMNZ)	Gold	7,500^{^}
^{^} Shipments figures based on certification alone.
