= Puberty Blues (song) =

Single by Jenny Morris
- A-side: "Puberty Blues"
- B-side: "Adolescent Angst"
- Released: December 1981
- Genre: Pop, rock
- Label: Mushroom Records
- Songwriter(s): Tim Finn
- Producer(s): Tim Finn, Neil Finn, Eddie Rayner

Jenny Morris singles chronology
"Puberty Blues" (1981)	"Little By Little" (1982)

"Puberty Blues" is a song written by New Zealand musician Tim Finn for the 1981 Australian film of the same name. In the film, New Zealand recording artist Sharon O'Neill performs the song. New Zealand recording artist Jenny Morris recorded the single version and released it in December 1981 as her debut single. The single version has alternate chorus lyrics to that of the film. The song peaked at number 88 on the Kent Music Report.

In a 2012 interview, Morris said "Sharon (O'Neill) had recorded the version for the film and afterwards Tim (Finn) decided he wanted another version for the single."

== Track listings ==
7" (K-8598)

1. "Puberty Blues"
2. "Adolescent Angst" (credited to the Morris Majors)

== Charts ==
Chart (1981/82)	Peak position
Australian (Kent Music Report) Singles	88
