= The Crocodiles =

New Zealand pop/new wave band

- Origin: New Zealand
- Genres: Pop, new wave
- Years active: 1979–1981
- Label: Stunn
- Past members: Fane Flaws; Peter Dasent; Tony Backhouse; Arthur Baysting; Jenny Morris; Tina Matthews; Bruno Lawrence; Ian Gilroy; Rick 'Rikki' Morris; Jonathan Zwartz; Barton Price

The Crocodiles were a New Zealand pop/new wave band formed in 1979 with lead singer Jenny Morris, who went on to commercial success as a solo artist in Australia; and later included drummer Barton Price, who subsequently joined Sardine v and then Models. The Crocodiles' top 20 hit single in New Zealand was "Tears" in 1980 from debut album Tears; a second album, Looking at Ourselves, appeared in November. The band relocated to Australia in February 1981 but disbanded in July without further releases.

== History ==
Fane Flaws was guitarist and Bruno Lawrence was drummer for Blerta (1971–1975); Flaws and Lawrence then went on to form the Spats (1977–1979) with Tony Backhouse on guitar and Peter Dasent on keyboards. In 1978, an all-female band, the Wide Mouthed Frogs, comprising Jenny Morris and Kate Brockie (lead vocals), Tina Matthews (bass guitarist), Andrea Gilkison (guitar), Bronwyn Murray (keyboards) and Sally Zwartz (drums) was established in Wellington, New Zealand, Lawrence played saxophone for the band at a number of their performances, and Dasent was the musical director for the band.

The Crocodiles evolved from the Spats, under the mentorship of US producer Kim Fowley, and were founded in 1979 in Auckland with Backhouse, Dasent, Flaws, Lawrence and Mark Hornibrook on bass guitar and songwriter Arthur Baysting. The lineup was finalised with Morris joining as lead singer. They were managed by Mike Chunn (ex-Split Enz), Mark Hornibrook was subsequently replaced by Mathews.

In April 1980, they released their debut album Tears (produced by Glyn Tucker), together with the single, "Tears". The album and the single both reached No. 17 on the New Zealand album and singles charts respectively that year. The band's second single, "Whatcha Gonna Do", however wasn't as successful, failing to chart. That year, they won Best Group and Most Promising Group at the New Zealand Music Awards. Lawrence then left the band and was replaced by Ian Gilroy (the Whizz Kids); Flaws also left the group but continued to provide material for the band's second album, Looking at Ourselves (produced by Ian Morris), which was released in November 1980 but failed to chart. In December 1980, Gilroy left to join the Swingers, with Dasent and Mathews leaving soon afterwards. A new lineup was formed with original members Morris and Backhouse joined by Barton Price (drums), Jonathan Swartz (bass) and Rick Morris (guitar).

In February 1981, the band flew to Australia but did not last long before dissolving; Morris beginning her solo career, Price joining Sardine v and then Models. Jonathan Zwartz became one of Australia's most sought-after bassists. Backhouse became a session musician with artists including Renée Geyer, Joe Walsh, Jenny Morris, Dave Dobbyn, Tim Finn and Vince Jones and immersed himself in a cappella gospel music. Dasent became a film composer, and Flaws became a successful video and film director. Flaws, Dasent and Backhouse continued to write and record together as the Bend; Dasent and Backhouse recorded as Blessed Relief.

== Discography ==
=== Albums ===
Year	Title	Label	Charted	Country	Catalog Number
1980	Tears: Released: April 1980	RCA Victor	17	New Zealand	VPL 10285
1980	Looking at Ourselves: Released: November 1980	Stunn	-	New Zealand	MLF 450

=== Singles ===
- "Tears"/"In My Suit" - RCA (MS 433) (1980) (NZ #17)
- "Whatcha Gonna Do"/"All Night Long" - RCA (103619) (1980)
- "Telephone Lover"/"Looking at Ourselves" - RCA (6538)(1980)
- "Teenarama"/"New Girl on the Beat" - RCA (103729) (1980)
- "Hello Girl"/"Romantic as Hell" - CBS (MS 476) (1980)
- "New Wave Goodbye"/"Ribbons of Steel" - Aura (AUS126) (1981)
