= Shiver (Jenny Morris album) =

Studio album by Jenny Morris
- Released: 24 July 1989
- Recorded: 1988–1989
- Genre: Pop
- Length: 37:26
- Label: Warner
- Producer: Andrew Farriss

Jenny Morris chronology
Body and Soul (1987)	Shiver (1989)	Honeychild (1991)

Singles from Shiver
- 1. "Saved Me" Released: June 1989; 2. "She Has to Be Loved" Released: August 1989; 3. "Street of Love" Released: December 1989; 4. "Aotearoa" Released: January 1990; 5. "Self Deceiver" Released: 1990

Professional ratings
Review scores
Source	Rating
AllMusic	4/5 stars

Shiver is the second solo studio album by New Zealand singer Jenny Morris, released on 24 July 1989 by Warner Music Group. The album was produced by Andrew Farriss and was critically acclaimed as Morris's "most successful – and best" album to date. Shiver debuted inside the top twenty on the Australian ARIA Albums Chart and was certified double platinum by ARIA. It yielded five singles: "Saved Me", "She Has to Be Loved", "Aotearoa", "Street of Love" and "Self Deceiver".

Shiver was commercially successful in Australia. In early August 1989, it debuted at number fifteen on the Australian ARIA Albums Chart. It went on to peak at number five on its fifteenth week and stayed there for two consecutive weeks. The album spent a total of forty-one weeks in the top fifty, and fifty-seven weeks in the top one-hundred. The Australian Recording Industry Association awarded the album double platinum certification for shipping 140,000 copies and became the thirtieth highest-selling album in Australia for 1989. It sold around 250,000 copies in Australia.

Jonathan Lewis of AllMusic stated that although Shiver was not a huge leap from her previous album, it showed that she was maturing as a songwriter. He ends the review stating, "The most successful – and best – of Jenny Morris' albums." The album also features Morris's cover version of "(Beggar on The) Street of Love" by Australian musician Paul Kelly.

In 2019, the album was re-released on vinyl and as a 30th Anniversary Edition.

== Track listing ==
Shiver track listing
No.	Title	Writer(s)	Length
1.	"Saved Me"	Andrew Farriss, Morris	3:46
2.	"Bag Lady"	Morris	3:11
3.	"She Has to Be Loved"	Farriss, Morris	4:05
4.	"Conscience"	Farriss, Morris	2:32
5.	"Street of Love"	Paul Kelly	3:03
6.	"Self Deceiver"	Morris, Kelly	3:34
7.	"Little Little"	Morris	3:55
8.	"Land of the Long White Cloud/Aotearoa"	Morris	3:49
9.	"Humanity"	Farriss, Morris	2:48
10.	"Shiver"	Morris	2:53

== Charts ==
=== Weekly charts ===
Weekly chart performance for Shiver
Chart (1989–1990)	Peak position
Australian ARIA Albums Chart	5
New Zealand Albums Chart	6

=== Year-end charts ===
Year-end chart performance for Shiver
Chart (1989)	Position
Australian ARIA Albums Chart	30
Chart (1990)	Position
Australian ARIA Albums Chart	82

== Certifications ==
Certifications for Shiver
Region	Certification	Certified units/sales
Australia (ARIA)	3× Platinum	210,000^{^}
New Zealand (RMNZ)	Platinum	15,000^{^}
^{^} Shipments figures based on certification alone.

== Release history ==
Release history and formats for Shiver
Region	Date	Label	Format	Catalogue
Australia/New Zealand	24 July 1989	Warner	CD, cassette	256462
Australia	23 August 2019	Warner Records	Limited edition LP	256462
