= Saved Me =

- CD single cover

Single by Jenny Morris

from the album Shiver
- A-side: "Saved Me"
- B-side: "Drown"
- Released: 19 June 1989
- Genre: Pop/Rock
- Label: WEA
- Songwriters: Andrew Farriss, Jenny Morris
- Producer: Andrew Farriss

Jenny Morris singles chronology
"Lighthearted" (1987)	"Saved Me" (1989)	"She Has to Be Loved" (1989)

"Saved Me" is a song by New Zealand musician, Jenny Morris. It was released in June 1989 the lead single from her second studio album, Shiver (1989).

== Track listings ==
CD Single/ 7" (WEA 7–257528)

1. "Saved Me" – 3:46
2. "Drown" – 3:32

Remixes (WEA 903171563–0)

1. "Saved Me" (UK Shiver Mix) – 5:30
2. "Saved Me" (UK Shake Mix) – 3:48
3. "Self Deceiver" (Extended Mix) – 3:45

== Charts ==
Chart (1989)	Peak position
Australia (ARIA)	27
New Zealand (Recorded Music NZ)	37

== Music video ==
The promotional music video (clip) for Saved Me was filmed in Nicaragua. Prominent landmarks used briefly in the clip include the Old Cathedral of Managua in Managua and the Guadalupe Church in Granada. While Morris visited Nicaragua at the time and appears in a few locations including a hotel, it is unclear that she traveled widely there.
