= I've Had You =

1991 single by Jenny Morris

- CD single cover

Single by Jenny Morris

from the album Honeychild
- B-side: "Who Loves Ya Babe"
- Released: 25 November 1991
- Length: 4:13
- Label: EastWest
- Songwriter(s): Jenny Morris, Paul Kelly
- Producer(s): Mark Forrester, Nick Launay, Jenny Morris

Jenny Morris singles chronology
"Break in the Weather" (1991)	"I've Had You" (1991)	"Zero" (1992)

"I've Had You" is a song by New Zealand musician Jenny Morris. It was released in November 1991 the second single from her third studio album, Honeychild (1991). The song reached number 39 in both New Zealand and Australia.

== Track listing ==
Australian CD single

1. "I've Had You"
2. "Who Loves Ya Babe"
3. "Piece of My Heart"
4. "Break in the Weather" (Fresh mix)

== Charts ==
Chart (1992)	Peak position
Australia (ARIA)	39
New Zealand (Recorded Music NZ)	39
