= You I Know =

- CD single cover

Single by Jenny Morris

from the album Body and Soul
- A-side: "You I Know"
- B-side: "Broke the Leather"
- Released: 27 July 1987
- Genre: Pop/Rock
- Label: WEA
- Songwriter(s): Neil Finn
- Producer(s): Mark Moffatt

Jenny Morris singles chronology
"Body and Soul" (1987)	"You I Know" (1987)	"Lighthearted" (1987)

"You I Know" is a song by New Zealand musician Jenny Morris. It was released in July 1987 as the third single from her debut studio album, Body and Soul (1987).

== Track listings ==
CD Single/ 7" (WEA – 0-258299)

1. "You I Know" – 4:10
2. "Broke the Leather" – 4:29

== Charts ==
=== Weekly charts ===
Chart (1987)	Peak position
Australia (Australian Music Report)	13
New Zealand (RMNZ)	30

=== Year-end charts ===
Chart (1987)	Position
Australia (Australian Music Report)	70
