= She Has to Be Loved =

1989 single by Jenny Morris

- 12-inch single cover

Single by Jenny Morris

from the album Shiver
- B-side: "Conscience"
- Released: 28 August 1989
- Length: 4:05
- Label: WEA
- Songwriters: Andrew Farriss, Jenny Morris
- Producer: Andrew Farriss

Jenny Morris singles chronology
"Saved Me" (1989)	"She Has to Be Loved" (1989)	"Street of Love" (1989)

Music video
- "She Has to Be Loved" on YouTube

"She Has to Be Loved" is a song by New Zealand singer-songwriter Jenny Morris. It was released in August 1989 as the second single from her second studio album, Shiver (1989). It became her most successful song in her home country, reaching number three on the RIANZ Singles Chart. It also entered the top five in Australia, reaching number five and becoming her highest-peaking hit there until 1991, when "Break in the Weather" reached number two.

== Track listings ==
7-inch and cassette single

1. "She Has to Be Loved" – 4:05
2. "Conscience" – 2:32

12-inch single

1. "She Has to Be Loved" (extended mix) – 6:18
2. "She Has to Be Loved" – 4:05
3. "Conscience" – 2:32

Mini-CD single

1. "She Has to Be Loved" – 4:05
2. "Conscience" – 2:32
3. "She Has to Be Loved" (extended mix) – 6:18

== Charts ==
=== Weekly charts ===
Chart (1989-1990)	Peak position
Australia (ARIA)	5
Italy Airplay (Music & Media)	4
New Zealand (Recorded Music NZ)	3

=== Year-end charts ===
Chart (1989)	Position
Australia (ARIA)	39

== Certifications ==
Region	Certification	Certified units/sales
Australia (ARIA)	Gold	35,000^{^}
New Zealand (RMNZ)	Gold	15,000^{‡}
^{^} Shipments figures based on certification alone.^{‡} Sales+streaming figures based on certification alone.
