= You're Gonna Get Hurt =

1986 single by Jenny Morris

- 7" vinyl single cover

Single by Jenny Morris

from the album Body and Soul
- A-side: "You're Gonna Get Hurt"
- B-side: "Cool"
- Released: 15 September 1986
- Genre: Pop/Rock
- Label: WEA
- Songwriter: Andrew Farriss
- Producer: Andrew Farriss

Jenny Morris singles chronology
"Dancing Daze" (1986)	"You're Gonna Get Hurt" (1986)	"Might Have Been" (1986)

"You're Gonna Get Hurt" is a song by New Zealand musician, Jenny Morris. It was released in September 1986 the lead single from her debut studio album, Body and Soul (1987). Also released at the same time was a 12" extended version, also featuring "Cool" as the B side, along with the 7" single version.

At the ARIA Music Awards of 1987, the song won Best Female Artist.

== Track listings ==
7" {nat|(WEA – 0-258635)}

1. "You're Gonna Get Hurt" – 3:39
2. "Cool" – 4:10

== Charts ==
Chart (1986)	Peak position
Australia (Kent Music Report)	24
