= Break in the Weather =

1991 single by Jenny Morris

- CD single cover

Single by Jenny Morris

from the album Honeychild
- B-side: "Lenny"
- Released: 9 September 1991
- Length: 4:28
- Label: EastWest
- Songwriter(s): Jenny Morris; Tam Morris
- Producer(s): Nick Launay

Jenny Morris singles chronology
"Piece of My Heart" (1990)	"Break in the Weather" (1991)	"I've Had You" (1991)

Music video
- "Break in the Weather" on YouTube

"Break in the Weather" is a song by New Zealand musician Jenny Morris. It was released in September 1991 the lead single from her third studio album, Honeychild (1991). The song became Morris's highest-peaking single in Australia, reaching number two for a week. In her native New Zealand, the song reached number five, making it her second-most-successful single, after 1989's "She Has to Be Loved".

== Track listings ==
Australian maxi-CD single

1. "Break in the Weather" (edited 7-inch) – 4:28
2. "Lenny" – 4:38
3. "Break in the Weather" (extended) – 5:49
4. "She Has to Be Loved" (12-inch Bridgeman Mix) – 6:24

German 7-inch single

A. "Break in the Weather" (edited 7-inch) – 3:36
B. "Lenny" – 4:38

== Charts ==
=== Weekly charts ===
Chart (1991)	Peak position
Australia (ARIA)	2
New Zealand (Recorded Music NZ)	5

=== Year-end charts ===
Chart (1991)	Position
Australia (ARIA)	52

== Certifications ==
Region	Certification	Certified units/sales
Australia (ARIA)	Gold	35,000^{^}
^{^} Shipments figures based on certification alone.
