= Dropbears =

Australian rock band

- Origin: Sydney, Australia
- Genres: Rock
- Years active: 1981–1987
- Past members: Johnny Batchelor; Simon Rudlin; Chris Toms; Phil Hall; James Elliot; Mike Knapp; Bob Cooper; Robert Hearn

Dropbears were an Australian rock band active in the early 1980s. They had a few national chart hits and received national airplay. They had a minor charting hit with "Shall We Go" in 1985.

== History ==
The band started life as The Socket Set in 1980, with Johnny Batchelor, Phil Hall (Sardine v, Lime Spiders), and a string of drummers. They played shows that included the sell-out opening night of The Saints' comeback Australian tour in 1980 (the Paralytic Tonight, Dublin Tomorrow tour).

As Dropbears, the band formed in Darlinghurst, Sydney, in 1981, with Batchelor, Simon Rudlin, and Chris "Chris Cross" Toms. Prior to this, Batchelor and Rudlin had been jamming with bass player Rod Brunel (from Sydney band The Singles), but it wasn't working well. Chris Cross, from Sydney punk band The Bedhogs, knew Batchelor, and asked him to join the band.

In 1982, Dropbears released the singles "Fun Loving" and "Lay Him Down", which both peaked at number one on the Sydney Indie charts. The following year, the band signed to WEA records and went on to release a series of successful singles.

In 2011, The Essential Dropbears was released through Warner Music Australia. The compilation album features ten tracks, including the 1985 chart hits "Shall We Go" and "In Your Eyes".

== Band members ==
- Johnny Batchelor – guitar, vocals (1980–86, 1987)
- Chris Cross (Chris Toms) – bass (1981–82)
- Phil Hall – bass, vocals (1980, 1982–86, 1987)
- Simon Rudlin – drums (1981–82)
- James Elliot – drums (1982)
- Mike Knapp – drums, backing vocals (1982–86, 1987)
- Bob Cooper – saxophones, lyricon (1983)
- Robert Hearn – guitar, guitar synth (1983–84)

== Discography ==
=== Studio albums ===
| Year | Album details | Peak chart positions |
| Year | Album details | AUS |
|---|---|---|
| 1984 | Untitled: Released: October 1984; Label: WEA Records (250809-1); Format: LP | 66 |

=== Compilations ===
| Year | Album details |
|---|---|
| 2011 | The Essential Dropbears: Released: 19 August 2011; Label: Warner Music Australia; Format: Compact Disc, Digital Download |

=== Singles ===
List of singles as lead artist, with selected chart positions and certifications
| Year | Title | Peak chart positions | Album |
| Year | Title | AUS | Album |
|---|---|---|---|
| 1981 | "Fun Loving" | – | non-album single |
| 1983 | "Lay Him Down" | – | non-album single |
| 1984 | "Shall We Go" | 61 | non-album single |
| 1984 | "Proud" | – | Untitled |
| 1985 | "In Your Eyes" | 90 | non-album single |
| 1986 | "Fun Loving" (re-release) | – | non-album single |
