= Peter Dasent =

New Zealand musician

Peter Desent
- Born: New Zealand
- Genres: Pop, new wave, jazz
- Occupations: Composer, musician, songwriter
- Instruments: Piano, keyboards
- Member of: The Umbrellas
- Formerly of: The Spats, The Crocodiles

Peter Dasent is a New Zealand born composer, pianist and songwriter who has lived and worked in Sydney, Australia since 1981, he has worked on numerous television and film scores .

== Music career ==
In NZ, Dasent played keyboards in the bands Spats, and The Crocodiles. He leads the chamber-jazz group the Umbrellas, is writing a book on the music of Nino Rota and currently works in music composition for film and television, most notably in the children's television series Play School.

Some of his more famous works were with film maker Peter Jackson in three of his early productions : Meet the Feebles (1989), Braindead (1992) and Heavenly Creatures (1994).

He also composed the music of three other movies : Channelling Baby (2000), Cubbyhouse (2001), and Voodoo Lagoon (2006), plus some music for TV series and documentaries.

Peter was part of a trans-Tasman recording band, the Bend, which releasedthe children's DVD/book The Underwatermelon Man and Other Unreasonable Rhymes in 1999. The Bend (Fane Flaws, Peter Dasent and Tony Backhouse) released an album of Sam Hunt's poems set to music, We Disappear in 2021. He collaborates with Tony Backhouse as Blessed Relief; the pair released their album Design For Living in 2017.
