= The Big Beat (Machinations album) =

Remix album by Machinations
- Released: May 1986
- Genre: Electronic, Synthpop
- Length: 46:30
- Label: White Label Records
- Producer: Bruce Brown, Julian Mendelsohn, Russell Dunlop

Machinations chronology
| Big Music (1985) | The Big Beat (1986) | Uptown (1988) |

The Big Beat is a remix album by Australian synthpop band Machinations. The album is a collection of 12" mixes and was released in May 1986 on White Label Records a subsidiary of Mushroom Records. The album peaked at number 83 on the Australian Kent Music Report.

== Track listing ==
Side A
| No. | Title | Writer(s) | Length |
|---|---|---|---|
| 1. | "One Closer Step" (Extended Mix) | Fred Loneragan, Nick Swan, Tim Doyle, Tony Starr | 6:29 |
| 2. | "No Say in It" (Mendeleson's Played Mix) | Fred Loneragan, Nick Swan, Tim Doyle, Tony Starr | 7:18 |
| 3. | "Execution of Love" (Extended Mix) | Fred Loneragan, Nick Swan, Tim Doyle, Tony Starr | 4:45 |
| 4. | "Pressure Sway" (Extended Mix) | Fred Loneragan, Nick Swan, Tim Doyle, Tony Starr | 4:58 |

Side B
| No. | Title | Writer(s) | Length |
|---|---|---|---|
| 1. | "My Heart's On Fire" (Extended Mix) | Fred Loneragan, Nick Swan, Tim Doyle, Tony Starr | 10:22 |
| 2. | "Jumping the Gap" (Extended Mix) | Fred Loneragan, Henry Downes, Nick Swan, Tim Doyle, Tony Starr | 4:56 |
| 3. | "You Got Me Going Again" (Extended Mix) | Fred Loneragan, Nick Swan, Tim Doyle, Tony Starr | 8:08 |

== Charts ==
| Chart (1986) | Peak position |
|---|---|
| Australia (Kent Music Report) | 83 |
