= Bear Witness =

1986 studio album by I'm Talking

Studio album by I'm Talking
- Released: 4 August 1986
- Recorded: January–March 1986
- Studios: François Kevorkian's (New York); AAV (Melbourne)
- Genres: Disco; pop rock; funk
- Length: 36:15
- Label: Regular
- Producers: Fred Maher; Martyn Webster

I'm Talking chronology
Bear Witness (1986)	Dancing (1988)

Singles from Bear Witness
- 1. "Do You Wanna Be?" Released: May 1986; 2. "Holy Word" Released: July 1986; 3. "How Can It Be?" Released: October 1986

Bear Witness is the first and only studio album by Australian pop rock band I'm Talking. The line-up was Zan Abeyratne and Kate Ceberano on co-lead vocals, Stephen Charlesworth on keyboards, Ian Cox on saxophone, Robert Goodge on lead guitar, Barbara Hogarth on bass guitar and Cameron Newman on drums. It was released in August 1986 on Regular Records and reached No. 14 on the Kent Music Report albums chart. All eight tracks were co-written by Cox (lyrics) and Goodge (music). The album yielded three singles, "Do You Wanna Be?" (May), "Holy Word" (July) and "How Can It Be?" (October).

At the 1986 Countdown Australian Music Awards Bear Witness was nominated for Best Debut Album. Richard Alan, responsible for its cover, was nominated for Best Cover Artist at the 1987 ARIA Music Awards. I'm Talking received international interest; as a result they undertook a 36-date tour of the United Kingdom supporting Five Star in late 1986. In October 2010, Bear Witness was listed in the book 100 Best Australian Albums. In December 2021 Rolling Stone Australia ranked it No. 162 on their list of 200 Greatest Australian Albums of All Time. An expanded re-mastered version of the album was issued in March 2018 by Bloodlines, a subsidiary of the Mushroom Group. It included three non-album singles—"Trust Me" (November 1984), "Lead the Way" (June 1985) and "Love Don't Live Here Anymore" (August)—as well as B-sides and mix tracks. This release peaked at No. 41 on the ARIA Top 100 Physical Albums chart and No. 2 on the ARIA Hitseeker Albums chart.

== Background ==
Bear Witness was the debut studio album issued by Australian pop rock band I'm Talking on 4 August 1986. The line-up was Zan Abeyratne and Kate Ceberano on co-lead vocals, Stephen Charlesworth on keyboards, Ian Cox on saxophone, Robert Goodge on lead guitar, Barbara Hogarth on bass guitar and Cameron Newman on drums. Whilst most contemporary Australian musicians were playing pub rock in the 1980s, I'm Talking provided London-influenced soul combined with American R&B and electro-funk.

Ceberano stated that the album's name has "no specific meaning". According to The Canberra Times' Pollyanna Sutton their earlier song writing process consisted of "a member presenting a melody to the other members, who in turn make up something to suit the riff on their own instruments, with [Cox] adding lyrics". Goodge later described it as being "a collaborative process not just with each other but with the producer and engineer".

=== Early releases ===
I'm Talking's first release was a six-track extended play, Someday (May 1984), on independent label Randelli. The title track was aired on SBS-TV's Rock Around the World with a music video created after "we did some music for this video art thing and they did a rock clip for us in return". Robert Randall and Frank Bendinelli of Randelli Music had created an art installation, More Love Stories (1984), at the Australian Centre for Contemporary Art, South Yarra, for which I'm Talking provided the music. The EP was recorded before Abeyratne joined, according to Newman: "[Abeyratne] was a friend of [Ceberano]'s. She joined after about three gigs. [Ceberano] suggested that she come along and do some backing vocals, because none of us could sing."

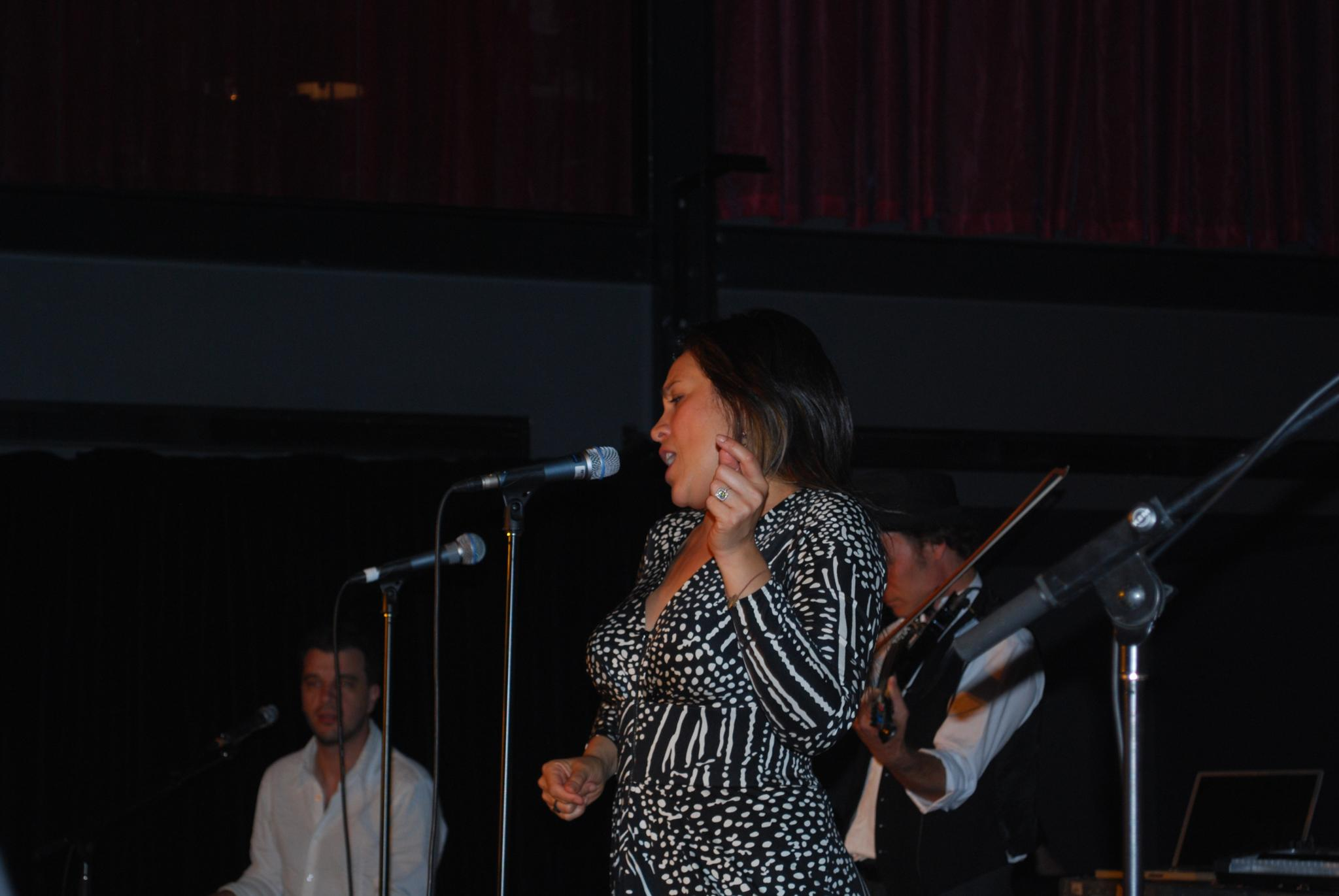
I'm Talking's co-lead singer, Kate Ceberano, solo performance, Melbourne, December 2009. On Bear Witness (1986 version) she provided lead vocals on six of eight tracks. The other tracks, "Holy Word" and "It's Over", had lead vocals by band mate, Zan Abeyratne.

The band were managed by Ken West and Vivian Lees, and following the release of Someday, they were signed to Regular Records, which had been founded by Cameron Allan and Martin Fabinyi. The group's initial work with Allan as producer were scrapped, "we just didn't see eye to eye. We didn't even reach the mix stage." Goodge expanded, "We spoke to lots of people who said, 'Yes, they knew what we wanted and they could do it', but we found that they couldn't. We threw the first tapes away, but we were learning all the time."

Eventually they found Ross Cockle (Glenn Shorrock, Real Life), "who had an empathy with the group and with disco". Their first three non-album singles—"Trust Me" (November 1984), "Lead the Way" (June 1985) and their cover version of Rose Royce's "Love Don't Live Here Anymore" (August)—were produced by Cockle for Regular Records. Writing credits for the first two singles were given as Ceberano, Charlesworth, Cox, Goodge, Hogarth and Newman. Ceberano later clarified that the other members of the group viewed the band as a collective, in which "everything was shared—the philosophy, the credits, the money"; however, in reality, she had little to do with the song writing or production. I'm Talking performed "Trust Me" on teen pop music TV programme Countdown on 9 December 1984. "Lead the Way" was broadcast on the same show in August 1985.

=== Debut album ===
In preparation for Bear Witness, Goodge explained that they would not use Cockle: "[he] was an engineer more than a musician, so we did all of the arrangements ourselves. For the album we'll use someone different again – we're talking to two American guys out of Scritti Politti who are interested in doing it. They contacted us when they were out here." Goodge also decided not to include their singles, "[they] won't be on it. I always feel that's a bit of a rip-off – we will have done four singles so we're almost up to one side of an album – there's no point. It's more fun for us to do all new stuff."

Bear Witness was produced by Fred Maher and Martyn Webster (chief engineer on ABC's How to Be a ... Zillionaire!) for Regular Records. Maher of British group Scritti Politti had seen "Lead the Way" on Countdown when his group had visited Australia and agreed to produce their album. He also provided drums on some tracks as regular drummer Newman "had trouble with some of the songs". They started recording it with Maher in New York at François Kevorkian's studio and finished with Webster at Melbourne's AAV Studios. Ceberano, in her autobiography, I'm Talking: My Life, My Words, My Music (2014), recalls that during their time in New York, Goodge and Maher disagreed on how the album should sound, particularly after Maher brought in his Scritti Politti band mate David Gamson to assist in programming and rearranging some songs. Ceberano stated "[Goodge] resented the whole idea that someone else could rearrange a song that he had written and represent it as a new piece of work".

The original album provided three singles, "Do You Wanna Be?" (May 1986), "Holy Word" – with lead vocals by Abeyratne – in July and "How Can It Be?" (October). Abeyratne's lead vocals for "Holy Word" occurred as Ceberano was unavailable the day they were recording its demos, according to Goodge. Abeyratne also sang lead vocals for the track "It's Over". Goodge later described recording "How Can It Be?", "[Maher] added the percussive flourishes but [Webster] mixed it alone. I think [Maher] loved the idea of doing a freestyle track but baulked at the idea of something so genre bearing his final imprint. I think [Webster] got it just right." Its music video was shot in Edinburgh, which shows Ceberano in the woods and has a "moody and romantic nature".

By the time the album was released Newman had been replaced on drums by Warren McLean (ex-Machinations). For international releases they were signed to London Records. The band received considerable international interest, and, as a result I'm Talking undertook a 36-date United Kingdom tour supporting Five Star. Back in their home country they added Kevin Wiltshire on keyboards and performed on the Australian Made tour from December 1986 to January 1987. In between tour dates, they recorded two new tracks, "So Far Away" and "Run Away with Me". In March, Abeyratne, Charlesworth and McLean left I'm Talking and the remaining four-piece disbanded in July.

== Reissues ==
For the CD version of Bear Witness, issued in 1996, I'm Talking added five tracks: two dance mixes of the album's first two singles, "Do You Wanna Be?" and "Holy Word", three A-sides of earlier singles: "Trust Me", "Lead the Way" and "Love Don't Live Here Anymore". Regular Records' former owner, Martin Fabinyi, provided Goodge with I'm Talking's studio master tapes in the late 2010s. Goodge worked on analogue tapes: some had to be baked to avoid their disintegration during remixing, and he was able to source a machine to play the tapes. This resulted in an expanded re-mastered version of the album, which was released in March 2018 on vinyl by Bloodlines, a subsidiary of the Mushroom Group. This version added two tracks from early singles, "Love Don't Live Here Anymore" and "Trust Me". On the same day in March 2018 the album was reissued as a 2× CD expanded version with the first disc having the same content as the related vinyl reissue and a second disc being a compilation of previously unreleased tracks ("So Far Away", "Run Away with Me"), 12" mixes ("Do You Wanna Be?", "Holy Word", "Disaster", "Someday"), B-sides of singles ("Disko (Fall in Love Forever)", "Cry Me a River") and mixes of two tracks ("Lead the Way" New York mix, "Do You Wanna Be" Stock Aitken Waterman (SAW) 12" mix). Bloodlines also provided a 36-track collector's edition via music download (DL), which Goodge analysed track-by-track. This version includes all the content from the 2× CD reissue plus 15 tracks: all of Someday EP and "rarities inspired by their New York experiences with hip hop culture and 12" mixes".

== Critical reception ==
AllMusic's Andy Kellman defined the group's range, which "eased across spring-loaded pop-funk, pure R&B balladry, and freestyle with a bright synthesis of played and programmed instrumentation." Deborah Cameron of The Canberra Times describes Bear Witness as having "a very strong disco sound, and while disco is not my preference, I have a feeling one day [Ceberano] will rise above it, the sound is good. It is a Countdown audience sound though, and if measured on a simple danceability criteria is energetic and dominated by Ceberano."

In October 2010 the CD re-issue version of 1996 was listed at number 93 in the book 100 Best Australian Albums. The authors—John O'Donnell, Toby Creswell and Craig Mathieson—explained that "[it] remains a definitive Australian pop album, stocked with single after impressive single." Its legacy "inspired a new generation of electronic artists and DJs who would make their mark in the 1990s and beyond." A Various Artists' compilation album of songs from those 100 albums was released in November 2010, which included "Trust Me". It is about personal relationships and was described by the book's writers, "the sting in the tale made clear where the power lay" in the relationship, with Ceberano exclaiming, "Everything is in my hands tonight."

The book's writers also state:

The tracks were full-bodied and vigorous, swept along by [Goodge]'s unobtrusive but finely honed funk guitar parts. The songs were richer than the first wave of Madonna's hits, which were breaking concurrently, and both [Ceberano] and [Abeyratne] were more powerful vocalists... The necessity of playing live grounded the compositions – the muscular assuredness of [Hogarth]'s bass on the likes of 'How Can it Be?', a melancholic funk ballad, allowed a young [Ceberano] to play a wronged diva... the music was upbeat but the lyrics were rarely celebratory... [T]he relationships described on Bear Witness are generally unbalanced – one party controls the other. When they're equal, there's simply mistrust.

Stack's Jeff Jenkins commented of the expanded reissue, "More than three decades later, the songs still sound sophisticated... [one of] the era's finest example[s] of dance-pop."

Cameron Adams of Rolling Stone Australia described "How Can It Be?" as having "channelled the slow-burn jazz tunes the wildly talented Ceberano sang before I’m Talking and returned to after they disbanded". When writing for The Herald Sun he observed "[it's] a stunning ballad that reminds you that [Ceberano] was then barely legal but had years of under-age jazz shows under her wings." In December 2021 Rolling Stone Australia ranked Bear Witness at No. 162 on their list of 200 Greatest Australian Albums of All Time. Adams, now writing for Rolling Stone Australia, observed, "[it's] a snapshot of Australian pop being changed forever, for the better", which "merged the escapism of Studio 54 dance music with the experimentalism of Melbourne post-punk/post-funk". Bryget Chrisfield of Stack described Ceberano's performance on "Someday" as "flawless vocal on [a] sax-tastic" song.

== Commercial reception ==
The original release of Bear Witness peaked at No. 14 on the Kent Music Report Albums Chart: "Do You Wanna Be?" reached No. 8 on the related Kent Music Report Singles Chart – their highest placement, while "Holy Word" got to No. 9. The 1996 CD reissue included the previous three singles: "Trust Me" had peaked at No. 10, "Lead the Way" at No. 25 and "Love Don't Live Here Anymore" at No. 21. "How Can It Be?", however, failed to chart, which Goodge and Ceberano put down to the fact that it was released when they were touring the UK and were unable to promote it.

At the 1986 Countdown Australian Music Awards Bear Witness was nominated for Best Debut Album. Richard Alan, responsible for the album's cover, was nominated for Best Cover Artist at the 1987 ARIA Music Awards. Considering earlier singles, which appear on the reissues of Bear Witness, "Trust Me" won Best Debut Single at the 1984 Countdown Australian Music Awards (held in May 1985), Ceberano was nominated for Best Female Performance in a Video ("Trust Me"), and the group won Most Promising New Talent. The 2018 reissue peaked at No. 41 on the ARIA Top 100 Physical Albums and No. 2 on its Hitseeker Albums chart.

== Track listings ==
=== 1986 vinyl/cassette tape version ===
Regular Records (RML 53202, RMC 53202)

All tracks are written by Ian Frank Cox, Robert William Goodge

Side A
No.	Title	Length
1.	"Do You Wanna Be?"	5:31
2.	"Holy Word" (lead vocals by Zan Abeyratne)	4:25
3.	"How Can It Be?"	4:30
4.	"Baby Baby Baby"	3:48

Side B
No.	Title	Length
5.	"Stay with Me"	5:29
6.	"It's Over" (lead vocals by Abeyratne)	4:04
7.	"Disaster"	3:57
8.	"Love Means Everything"	4:19
Total length:		36:15

=== 1986 CD version ===
Regular Records (CD 53202)

All tracks are written by Cox and Goodge.

No.	Title	Length
1.	"Do You Wanna Be?"	5:31
2.	"Holy Word" (lead vocals by Abeyratne)	4:25
3.	"How Can It Be?"	4:30
4.	"Baby Baby Baby"	3:48
5.	"Stay with Me"	5:29
6.	"It's Over" (lead vocals by Abeyratne)	4:04
7.	"Disaster"	3:57
8.	"Love Means Everything"	4:19
9.	"Do You Wanna Be?" (dance mix)	5:17
10.	"Holy Word" (dance mix by Martyn Webster)	5:29
Total length:		46:52

=== 1996 CD reissue ===
Regular Records (D91056, RMD51056, TVD91056)

All tracks are written by Cox and Goodge unless otherwise specified.

No.	Title	Writer(s)	Length
1.	"Do You Wanna Be?"		5:31
2.	"Holy Word" (lead vocals by Abeyratne)		4:25
3.	"How Can It Be?"		4:30
4.	"Baby Baby Baby"		3:48
5.	"Stay with Me"		5:29
6.	"It's Over" (lead vocals by Abeyratne)		4:04
7.	"Disaster"		3:57
8.	"Love Means Everything"		4:19
9.	"Do You Wanna Be?" (dance mix)		5:17
10.	"Holy Word" (dance mix by Martyn Webster)		5:29
11.	"Trust Me"	Kate Ceberano, Stephen Charlesworth, Cox, Goodge, Barbara Hogarth	3:49
12.	"Lead the Way"	Ceberano, Charlesworth, Cox, Goodge, Hogarth, Cameron Newman	3:49
13.	"Love Don't Live Here Anymore"	Miles Gregory	4:22
Total length:			58:49

=== 2018 vinyl reissue ===
Bloodlines/Universal Music Australia (BLOODLP9)

All tracks are written by Cox and Goodge unless otherwise specified.

Side A
No.	Title	Writer(s)	Length
1.	"Do You Wanna Be?"		5:31
2.	"Holy Word" (lead vocals by Abeyratne)		4:25
3.	"How Can It Be?"		4:30
4.	"Baby Baby Baby"		3:48
5.	"Love Don't Live Here Anymore"	Gregory	4:22

Side B
No.	Title	Writer(s)	Length
6.	"Stay with Me"		5:29
7.	"It's Over" (lead vocals by Abeyratne)		4:04
8.	"Disaster"		3:57
9.	"Love Means Everything"		4:19
10.	"Trust Me"	Ceberano, Charlesworth, Cox, Goodge, Hogarth	3:49
Total length:			44:31

=== 2018 expanded reissue edition ===
Bloodlines/Universal Music Australia (BLOOD15)

All tracks are written by Cox and Goodge unless otherwise specified.

Disc One – Bear Witness
No.	Title	Writer(s)	Length
1.	"Do You Wanna Be?"		5:31
2.	"Holy Word" (lead vocals by Abeyratne)		4:25
3.	"How Can It Be?"		4:30
4.	"Baby Baby Baby"		3:48
5.	"Love Don't Live Here Anymore" (original single version)	Gregory	4:29
6.	"Stay with Me"		5:29
7.	"It's Over" (lead vocals by Abeyratne)		4:04
8.	"Disaster"		3:57
9.	"Love Means Everything"		4:19
10.	"Trust Me" (original single version)	Ceberano, Charlesworth, Cox, Goodge, Hogarth	3:49

All tracks are written by Cox and Goodge unless otherwise specified.

Disc Two – Bonus Tracks
No.	Title	Writer(s)	Length
1.	"Lead the Way" (original single version)	Ceberano, Charlesworth, Cox, Goodge, Hogarth, Newman	3:49
2.	"So Far Away" (previously unreleased)		4:06
3.	"Do You Wanna Be?" (12" mix)		5:17
4.	"Holy Word" (12" mix)		5:29
5.	"Run Away with Me" (previously unreleased)		4:56
6.	"Disaster" (12" mix)		5:17
7.	"Someday" (12" mix from Someday EP)		7:04
8.	"Disko (Fall in Love Forever)" (B-Side on "Lead the Way")		4:19
9.	"Cry Me a River" (B-Side on "Love Don't Live Here Anymore")	Arthur Hamilton	4:10
10.	"Lead the Way" (New York version 12" mix)	Ceberano, Charlesworth, Cox, Goodge, Hogarth, Newman	8:40
11.	"Do You Wanna Be" (SAW version 12" mix)		7:20

=== 2018 collector's edition ===
Bloodlines

All tracks are written by Cox and Goodge unless otherwise specified.

Bear Witness (Collector's Edition)
No.	Title	Writer(s)	Length
1.	"Do You Wanna Be?"		5:31
2.	"Holy Word" (lead vocals by Abeyratne)		4:25
3.	"How Can It Be?"		4:30
4.	"Baby Baby Baby"		3:48
5.	"Love Don't Live Here Anymore" (original single version)	Gregory	4:29
6.	"Stay with Me"		5:29
7.	"It's Over" (lead vocals by Abeyratne)		4:04
8.	"Disaster"		3:57
9.	"Love Means Everything"		4:19
10.	"Trust Me" (original single version)	Ceberano, Charlesworth, Cox, Goodge, Hogarth	3:49
11.	"Lead the Way" (original single version)	Ceberano, Charlesworth, Cox, Goodge, Hogarth, Newman	3:49
12.	"So Far Away" (previously unreleased)		4:06
13.	"Do You Wanna Be?" (12" mix)		5:17
14.	"Holy Word" (12" mix)		5:29
15.	"Run Away with Me" (previously unreleased)		4:56
16.	"Disaster" (12" mix)		5:17
17.	"Someday" (12" mix from Someday EP)	Ceberano, Charlesworth, Cox, Goodge, Hogarth, Newman	7:04
18.	"Disko (Fall in Love Forever)" (B-Side on "Lead the Way")		4:19
19.	"Cry Me a River" (B-Side on "Love Don't Live Here Anymore")	Hamilton	4:10
20.	"Lead the Way" (New York version 12" mix)	Ceberano, Charlesworth, Cox, Goodge, Hogarth, Newman	8:40
21.	"Do You Wanna Be" (SAW version 12" mix)		7:20
22.	"Someday" (original single version)	Ceberano, Charlesworth, Cox, Goodge, Hogarth, Newman	3:54
23.	"Here, There and Everywhere" (from Cooking with George (Triple J))	Ceberano, Charlesworth, Cox, Goodge, Hogarth, Newman	3:40
24.	"Lead the Way" (New York version single mix, previously unreleased)	Ceberano, Charlesworth, Cox, Goodge, Hogarth, Newman	3:51
25.	"Trust Me" (12" mix)	Ceberano, Charlesworth, Cox, Goodge, Hogarth	5:49
26.	"Take It to the Bridge" (B-side of "Trust Me" (12" single))	Ceberano, Charlesworth, Cox, Goodge, Hogarth, Newman	3:44
27.	"Do You Wanna Be" (original single version)		4:11
28.	"Holy Word" (original single version, lead vocals by Abeyratne)		4:04
29.	"Scratchin'" (from Cooking with George (Triple J))	Ceberano, Charlesworth, Cox, Goodge, Hogarth, Newman	3:40
30.	"Stay with Me" (previously unreleased single mix)		3:28
31.	"Love Means Everything" (previously unreleased single mix)		4:07
32.	"The Restaurant" (from Someday EP)	Ceberano, Charlesworth, Cox, Goodge, Hogarth, Newman	2:02
33.	"Brief Encounter" (from Someday EP)	Ceberano, Charlesworth, Cox, Goodge, Hogarth, Newman	1:11
34.	"The Bar" (from Someday EP)	Ceberano, Charlesworth, Cox, Goodge, Hogarth, Newman	1:44
35.	"The Apartment" (from Someday EP)	Charlesworth, Laurie McCrae	1:40
36.	"Lead the Way" (12" mix)	Ceberano, Charlesworth, Cox, Goodge, Hogarth, Newman	5:45
Total length:			154:59

== Personnel ==
Credits:

I'm Talking

- Zan Abeyratne – backing vocals (except Someday tracks), lead vocals ("Holy Word", "It's Over")
- Kate Ceberano – lead vocals (except "Holy Word", "It's Over")
- Stephen Charlesworth – keyboards
- Ian Cox – saxophone
- Robert Goodge – guitar, twelve-string guitar
- Barbara Hogarth – bass guitar
- Cameron Newman – drums
- Warren McLean – drums ("So Far Away", "Run Away with Me")
- Kevin Wiltshire – keyboards ("So Far Away", "Run Away with Me")

Additional musicians

- Fred Maher – drum samples
- John Potoker – drum samples
- John Barrett – brass ("Baby Baby Baby", "Love Means Everything")
- Bill Harrower – brass ("Baby Baby Baby", "Love Means Everything")
- Peter Salt – brass ("Baby Baby Baby", "Love Means Everything")

Artisans

- Fred Maher – arrangements, producer ("Holy Word", "How Can It Be?", "Stay with Me, "It's Over", "Disaster")
- Martyn Webster – audio engineer, recording, mixing, producer ("Do You Wanna Be?, "Baby Baby Baby", "Love Means Everything")
- David Gamson – programming, rearrangements
- Ross Cockle – producer, audio engineer ("Trust Me", "Lead the Way", "Disko (Fall in Love Forever)", "Love Don't Live Here Anymore", "Cry Me a River")
- Robert Goodge – co-producer
- Stephen Charlesworth – co-producer
- Cameron Craig – assistant engineer
- Richard Allan – cover art
- Grant Mathews – cover design
- Warwick Bone – recording engineer ("Someday" 12" mix)
- Michael Letho – recording engineer ("Someday" 12" mix)
- Chris Wyatt – recording engineer ("Someday" 12" mix)
- Ian Curnow – remixer ("Do You Wanna Be" [SAW 12" mix])
- Phil Harding – remixer ("Do You Wanna Be" [SAW 12" mix])

== Charts ==
Chart peak position for 1986
Chart (1986)	Peak position
Australian Albums (Kent Music Report)	14

Chart peak position for 2018
Chart (2018)	Peak position
Australian Albums (ARIA)	– (Note: Bear Witness did not enter the Australian Top 100 albums in 2018 but did peak at number 41 on the Australian Physical Albums chart and number 2 on the Australian Hitseeker Albums chart.)

== Release history ==
Release dates and formats for Bear Witness
Region	Date	Format	Label	Catalogue No.
AUS	4 August 1986	LP / MC	Regular	RML / RMC 53202
AUS	4 August 1986	CD	Regular	CD 53202
AUS	1996	CD	Regular	D91056, RMD51056, TVD91056
AUS	23 March 2018	LP	Bloodlines/Universal	BLOODLP9
AUS	23 March 2018	2×CD	Bloodlines/Universal	BLOOD15
AUS	23 March 2018	DL	Bloodlines	–
