= Point Blank (disambiguation) =

Point blank is a close range for a ballistics shot.

Point Blank may also refer to:

== Music ==
- Point Blank (band), a Texas-based rock band from the 1980s best known for their hit "Nicole"

- Point Blank (1976 album), a self-titled album from this group

- Point Blank (hip hop group), a Canadian hip-hop collective

- Point Blank (2008 album), a self-titled album from this group

- Point Blank (Bonfire album)
- Point Blank (Dub Pistols album)
- Point Blank (Electric Pandas album), 1985
- Point Blank (Sean Kingston album)
- Point Blank (Nailbomb album), 1994
- Pointblank Records, a blues record label under Virgin Records
- Point Blank Music College, a school in London
- "Point Blank" (Bruce Springsteen song), a song from his 1980 album The River

== Films ==
- Point Blank (1967 film), a 1967 John Boorman film starring Lee Marvin
- Point Blank (1998 film), a film starring Mickey Rourke and featuring James Gammon
- Point Blank (2010 film), a 2010 French film
- Point Blank (2019 film), a 2019 American film directed by Joe Lynch

== Television ==
- Point Blank (TV series), a Canadian television comedy series

== Video games ==
- Point Blank (video game series), a series of light gun shooter arcade games by Namco
- Point Blank (2008 video game), a 2008 computer game developed by Zepetto

== Novels and publishing ==
- Point Blank (publisher), a mystery books imprint of Wildside Press
- PointBlank, a StarFist: Force Recon 2006 novel by David Sherman and Dan Cragg
- Point Blanc or Point Blank, an Alex Rider-series novel by Anthony Horowitz

== Other entertainment ==
- Point Blank (comics), a comic book by Ed Brubaker and Colin Wilson
- Pointblank (Transformers), a character in the Transformers franchise

== Places ==
- Point Blank, Texas, a town in the United States

== History ==
- Pointblank directive, an Allied war strategic policy of World War II that authorized the Operation Pointblank bombing offensive

== See also ==
- Grosse Pointe Blank, a 1997 American comedy movie
