= Australian Made: The Movie =

1987 film by Richard Lowenstein

- 1988 VHS cover
- Directed by: Richard Lowenstein
- Produced by: John McLean; Ian Gow
- Starring: INXS; Divinyls; Models; The Triffids; The Saints; I'm Talking; Jimmy Barnes
- Cinematography: Andrew de Groot
- Edited by: Jill Bilcock; Richard Lowenstein (add); Peter Carrodus (add); Christina de Podolinsky (add); Jill Holt (add); Robert Howard (add)
- Music by: Mark Opitz
- Distributed by: Village Roadshow, Hoyts
- Release date: 2 July 1987
- Running time: 90 minutes
- Country: Australia
- Language: English
- Box office: A$43,479 (Australia)

Australian Made: The Movie is a July 1987 live concert film of the Australian Made tour from December 1986 to January 1987.

The Australian Made tour featured internationally performing Australian acts, INXS, Divinyls, Models, The Triffids, The Saints, I'm Talking, Mental As Anything and Jimmy Barnes. The film was directed by INXS' video collaborator, Richard Lowenstein but did not contain any footage of Mental As Anything. Concert segments were linked by Troy Davies interviewing audience members and musicians.

== Release ==
Australian Made: The Movie was released in Australia on VHS in 1988. In 1989 in the United Kingdom, an edited VHS version, retitled as Australian Made: Featuring INXS Live, was issued which removed footage by Barnes. An edited DVD version was released in 2003 with all footage of The Triffids and Barnes removed. On 25 November 2016 a remastered version of the original film, with widescreen and remastered audio, was shown in Australian cinemas.

== Reception ==
=== Professional reviews ===
Professional ratings
Review scores
Source	Rating
Allmovie	2.5/5 stars
The Sydney Morning Herald	3.5/5 stars

Allmovie's Dan Pavlides summarised the film as depicting artists "which reflect the worldwide popularity of Australian rock music that emerged during the 1980s".

Craig Mathieson from The Sydney Morning Herald reviewed the film, saying: "the performances are well-mixed and cleanly shot. The camera at the foot of the stage tracks from one side to another, framing for posterity a young Kate Ceberano fronting I'm Talking on Lead the Way, while Saints frontman Chris Bailey surveys the crowd as Ghost Ships gets amplified to reach distant grandstands. The six gigs drew approximately 140,000 fans, and without giant screens or excess production you can see these individuals holding the attention of many."

== Cast ==
The cast includes:

Artist	Members
INXS	Garry Gary Beers, Andrew Farriss, Jon Farriss, Tim Farriss, Michael Hutchence, Kirk Pengilly
Divinyls	Chrissy Amphlett, Rick Grossman, Richard Harvey, Mark McEntee, Bjarne Ohlin
Models	James Freud, Sean Kelly, Roger Mason, Barton Price, James Valentine. Included Zan Abeyratne, Wendy Matthews & Kate Ceberano on backing vocals.
The Triffids	Jill Birt, Martyn Casey, Graham Lee, Alsy MacDonald, David McComb, Robert McComb
The Saints	Chris Bailey, Richard Burgman, Ivor Hay, Arturo Larizza
I'm Talking	Zan Abeyratne, Kate Ceberano, Stephen Charlesworth, Ian Cox, Robert Goodge, Barbara Hogarth, Warren McLean, Kevin Wiltshire
Jimmy Barnes	Jimmy Barnes, Peter Kekel

== Scenes ==
Australian Made: The Movie

1. Various artists / INXS – "Intro" / "Melting the Sun" (5:58)
2. Jimmy Barnes – "Ride the Night Away" (5:31)
3. The Triffids – "Wide Open Road" (5:46)
4. I'm Talking – "Lead the Way" (6:25)
5. The Saints – "Ghost Ships" (6:00)
6. Divinyls – "Only Lonely" (3:47)
7. Divinyls – "Temperamental" (3:59)
8. Models – "Let's Kiss" (5:44)
9. Models – "Out of Mind, Out of Sight" (4:44)
10. INXS – "Burn for You" (4:12)
11. Jimmy Barnes – "Lessons in Love" (5:44)
12. INXS – "What You Need" (6:04)
13. INXS – "The Loved One" (5:18)
14. Jimmy Barnes – "Working Class Man" (4:01)
15. INXS, Jimmy Barnes & a few friends – "Good Times" (4:28)
16. INXS – "Good Times" (instrumental) / "End titles" (2:38)

Australian Made: Featuring INXS Live DVD version

1. "Intro" – (2:56)
2. INXS – "Melting the Sun" (3:26)
3. I'm Talking – "Lead the Way" (4:20)
4. The Saints – "Ghostships" (3:51)
5. Models – "Let's Kiss" (3:31)
6. Models – "Out of Mind, Out of Sight" (3:50)
7. Divinyls – "Only Lonely" (2:59)
8. Divinyls – "Temperamental" (3:55)
9. INXS – "Burn for You" (4:00)
10. INXS – "Mystify" (3:11)
11. INXS – "What You Need" (4:36)
12. INXS – "The Loved One" (4:58)
13. INXS – "Don't Change" (6:49)
