= Oz for Africa =

Benefit concert in Sydney in 1985, part of Live Aid

- Genre: Pop; Rock
- Dates: 13 July 1985; 41 years ago
- Locations: Sydney Entertainment Centre, Sydney, New South Wales, Australia
- Years active: 1985
- Founders: Bob Geldof; Midge Ure
- Attendance: 11,000
- Website: www.live8live.com

Oz for Africa was an Australian concert held on 13 July 1985 at the Sydney Entertainment Centre. It was organised by Bill Gordon who also organised the EAT Concert held at the Myer Music Bowl in Melbourne at the end of January 1985. That event was televised nationally on Channel Nine. Over $1million was raised in the accompanying telethon. Gordon organised for all proceeds to go to the Red Cross. During the 10 hour event live satellite hook ups between Melbourne, Los Angeles and London included interviews with Geldof and many of the stars of the hit songs "We Are the World" & "Feed the World". The Oz for Africa concert was broadcast locally and internationally as part of the worldwide Live Aid performances to raise money for famine relief in Africa. The concert featured 17 bands performing some of their best-known songs.
All groups donated their services and the concert helped raise $10 million throughout Australia.

== Background ==
The original concert for famine relief in Ethiopia, called East Africa Tragedy (EAT) Appeal Concert, was held at the Myer Music Bowl, Melbourne on 27 January 1985. The concert was organised by Bill Gordon with assistance from Zev Eizics of Australian Concert Entertainment. Band Aid co-founder Midge Ure was brought to Australia to head the day-long televised performances. Live satellite crosses to fellow co-founder Bob Geldof and other Band Aid performers were included. The concert raised $1 million which was paid to the Red Cross.

Bill Gordon floated the idea of a UK concert with Ure utilising all of the performers of Band Aid's charity single "Do They Know It's Christmas?". Gordon visited Geldof and the Band Aid Committee in London in April 1985 to secure a place for Australia in the planned event. The idea grew to become the Live Aid concept, which was to have concerts in UK, USA and elsewhere (including Australia).

== Concert details ==
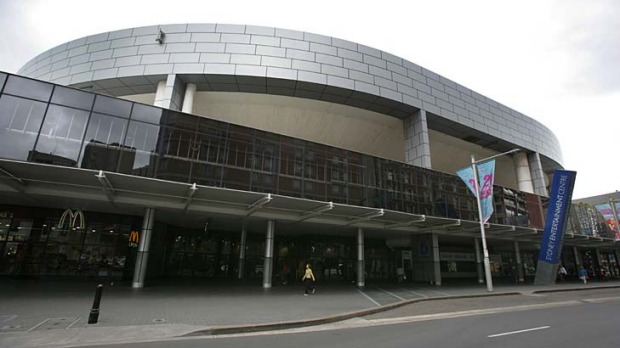
The Sydney Entertainment Center (exterior pictured) hosted the concert.

Due to time zone differences the Oz for Africa concert began twelve hours before the Wembley Stadium, London leg and was thus the first Live Aid concert.

Oz for Africa was organised by furniture dealer Bill Gordon and music producer Brian de Courcy, in co-operation with Geldof and the Band Aid trust. Gordon sold his furniture business to use the cash to support the concert. The compere, Ian "Molly" Meldrum, was the musical director of Australian Broadcasting Corporation’s TV pop show, Countdown.

The four-hour concert and telethon was broadcast on three Australian television networks; Channel 2 (ABC), Channel 7 and Channel 9. Sections of it were seen internationally during the world-wide live broadcast of Live Aid, some songs by INXS were shown on BBC in UK and other songs by Men at Work and Little River Band in United States on ABC. An edited version of Oz for Africa was broadcast on MTV from late at night on 12 July. Two INXS songs from the BBC broadcast are contained on Live Aid's four DVD boxed set released in 2004.

About 11,000 spectators paid $18.50 each, in order to see Oz for Africa. The concert and telethon, and the associated Sport Aid Oz, raised ten million Australian dollars for the International Disaster Emergency Committee in Australia. John Lilley of The Canberra Times attended the Sydney show and observed, "17 top Australian bands had the crowd of 11,500 jumping and clapping its approval." He found "[the venue] did not fill up until about two hours after the concert began, in time for the Machination's set. Its music and the following act by Dragon had most of the full house on their feet, singing and clapping. Even more joined in when Australian Crawl played 'Boy's Light Up'."

== Performance sequence ==
Song sequence with total set time for each band in brackets.

- Ian Meldrum: compere
- Mental As Anything:
  "Live It Up"
  "If You Leave Me, Can I Come Too?"
  "You're So Strong"
  Time On Stage (11:30)
- Machinations:
  "Pressure Sway"
  "My Heart's On Fire"
  "No Say in It"
  Time On Stage (15:30)
- I'm Talking:
  "Lead the Way"
  Time On Stage (5:15)
- Models:
  "Big on Love"
  "I Hear Motion"
  "Stormy Tonight"
  "Out of Mind, Out of Sight"
  Time On Stage (17:30)
- Do-Ré-Mi:
  "Man Overboard"
  "Warnings Moving Clockwise"
  "1000 Mouths"
  Time On Stage (13:00)
- Electric Pandas:
  "Missing Me"
  "Let's Gamble"
  Time On Stage (7:00)
- Dragon:
  "Speak No Evil"
  "Rain"
  "Are You Old Enough?"
  Time On Stage (16:00)
- Men at Work:
  "Maria", (Note: Broadcast by abc (American Broadcasting Company))
  "Overkill",
  "The Longest Night"
  Time On Stage (13:30)
- Australian Crawl:
  "Reckless (Don't Be So)"
  "Two Can Play"
  "The Boys Light Up"
  Time On Stage (16:30)
- Party Girls:
  "Isolation"
  Time On Stage (4:00)
- Uncanny X-Men:
  "Everybody Wants to Work"
  "50 Years"
  Time On Stage (8:00)
- Goanna:
  "Common Ground"
  "Song For Africa"
  "Solid Rock"
  Time On Stage (17:00)
- Little River Band:
  "Don't Blame Me",
  "Full Circle"
  "The Night Owls"
  "Playing to Win"
  Time On Stage (13:30)
- Mondo Rock:
  "Cool World"
  "The Moment"
  "The Modern Bop"
  "Come Said the Boy"
  Time On Stage (14:20)
- The Angels:
  "Small Price"
  "Eat City"
  "Underground"
  "Take a Long Line"
  Time On Stage (22:30)
- Renée Geyer:
  "Put a Little Love in Your Heart"
  "All My Love"
  "Telling it like it Is"
  Time On Stage (12:30)
- INXS:
  "Original Sin"
  "Listen Like Thieves"
  "Kiss the Dirt"
  "What You Need" (Note: Broadcast by BBC and later on the official 4-dvd box set 20th anniversary Live Aid (2004))
  "Don't Change"
  Time On Stage(22:00)

== Australia and Live 8 ==
It was announced by Geldof, in 2005, that he was preparing Live 8, a new project similar to Live Aid but for world poverty. Meldrum was approached for his opinion on a Live 8 concert in Australia: "I'm hoping, he'll [Geldof] do it, we will have the acts." After his efforts remained fruitless to develop an Australian version of Live 8, Meldrum with ex-Savage Garden front man Darren Hayes were the comperes, on Australian television, of a Preview of Live 8.
