= Esteem (album) =

Studio album by Machinations
- Released: April 1983
- Genre: Synthpop
- Length: 36:38
- Label: White; A&M
- Producer: Lobby Loyde, Paul Radcliffe, Russell Dunlop, Bruce Brown

Machinations chronology
Esteem (1983)	Big Music (1985)

Singles from Esteem
- 1. "Jack" Released: January 1983; 2. "Pressure Sway" Released: April 1983

Esteem is the debut studio album from Australian synthpop band Machinations. The album was released in April 1983 on White Label Records, a subsidiary of Mushroom Records.

== History ==
In late 1980, Machinations recorded some songs at Trafalgar Studios in November 1980, the band entered the studio with producer Lobby Loyde. These recordings resulted in the band's debut single, "Average Inadequacy"/"Arabia" in September 1981, and the four-track debut self-titled, Machinations EP, in December, both released on the independent Phantom Records label.

"Average Inadequacy" created enough interest for Mushroom's White Label to sign the band and reissue the single with a new B-side, "Machinations of Dance" in March 1982. A year later, Machinations issued a new single, "Jack"/"Be Double" in February 1983, prior to their debut album release, but it failed to chart. Esteem peaked at #54 on the Australian album charts. It was also released in the United States by A&M Records. Musically, the album contained synthpop with dark overtones, except for the single "Pressure Sway", a bright funk/pop song that was a dance-floor favourite.

== Reception ==
Cash Box magazine said "In the disquieting-but-danceable style of Tears for Fears and Depeche Mode, Australian quartet Machinations make rhythmic music with sinister overtones. The emphasis here is on extended cuts with oblique lyrics, creating a sustained, almost hypnotic mood. Vocalist Fred Loneragan has a limited range, but uses what he has effectively to express alienated sentiments."

== Singles ==
The first single, "Jack" was about US writer Jack Kerouac, and due to lyrical reference to illegal drugs ('I wanna take some 1960s LSD'), "Jack" was often not played in live sets when audiences included minors.

The second single off the album, "Pressure Sway", was released in April 1983 and reached #21 on the Australian singles charts during July 1983. It was released as both a 7" and 12" version. "Pressure Sway" also made an impact in the United States reaching #40 on Billboard's Club Play Singles chart.

== Track listing ==
All songs written by Doyle, Loneragan, Starr, Swan.

Australian release

Side A
No.	Title	Length
1.	"Esteem"	6:38
2.	"Pressure Sway"	3:53
3.	"Transient"	6:58

Side B
No.	Title	Length
1.	"Castle Hunting"	4:28
2.	"Jack"	3:27
3.	"Terminal Wharf"	5:28
4.	"The Hunt"	5:16

American release

Side A
No.	Title	Length
1.	"Pressure Sway"	4:05
2.	"Jump the Gap"	4:19
3.	"Average Inadequacy"	3:46

Side B
No.	Title	Length
1.	"Esteem"	6:42
2.	"Jack"	3:35
3.	"Transient"	6:55

== Charts ==
Chart (1983)	Peak position
Australia (Kent Music Report)	54

== Certifications ==
Region	Certification	Certified units/sales
Australia (ARIA)	Gold	20,000^{^}
^{^} Shipments figures based on certification alone.

== Personnel ==
- Tim Doyle — guitar
- Fred Loneragan — vocals
- Tony Starr — keyboards
- Nick Swan — bass guitar
