= Missing Me =

Missing Me may refer to:

- "Missing Me" (Electric Pandas song), a 1984 single by Electric Pandas
- "Missing Me" (Angie McMahon song), a 2018 single by Angie McMahon
- "Missing Me", a 2021 song by Gunna from the album DS4Ever
