= Lead the Way =

Lead the Way may refer to:

- Lead the Way (album), a 2000 studio album by T.W.D.Y.
- "Lead the Way" (song), a 1985 single by I'm Talking
- "Lead the Way", a song by Mariah Carey from the 2001 album Glitter
- "Lead the Way", a song by Flogging Molly from the 2022 album Anthem
