= Big Girls =

Single by Electric Pandas

from the album Point Blank
- A-side: "Big Girls"
- B-side: "T.V. Dogs"
- Released: May 1984
- Genre: Electronic, pop
- Length: 3:09
- Label: Regular Records
- Songwriter(s): Lin Buckfield
- Producer(s): Charles Fisher

Electric Pandas singles chronology
"Big Girls" (1984)	"Missing Me" (1985)

"Big Girls" is a song written by Lin Buckfield and recorded by the Australian band Electric Pandas. It was released in May 1984 as the band's debut single and it peaked at number 18 on the Australian Kent Music Report.

== Track listing ==
7" Single (RRSP 732)

- Side A "Big Girls" - 3:09
- Side B "T.V. Dogs" - 2:11

== Charts ==
Chart (1984)	Peak position
Australia (Kent Music Report)	18
