= Zan Abeyratne =

Australian-based singer (born 1961)

- Born: Suzanne Marguerite Abeyratne; 1961 (age 64–65); London, England
- Origin: Melbourne, Victoria, Australia
- Genres: Pop
- Occupation: Singer
- Instrument: Vocals
- Years active: 1978–present
- Labels: Mushroom/Festival; Amber/Polydor
- Member of: I'm Talking

Suzanne Marguerite Abeyratne (born 1961), who performs as Zan or Xan, is an Australian-based singer born in London. Abeyratne was a co-lead vocalist of I'm Talking (1984–87), alongside Kate Ceberano. She provided lead vocals on their single, "Holy Word" (July 1986), which peaked at No. 9 in Australia, and No. 21 in New Zealand. Along with her identical twin sister Sherine (a member of Big Pig (1985–91)), Abeyratne has provided backing vocals for Models, INXS, and U2, and has toured the world with other bands.

After the demise of I'm Talking, Abeyratne had a solo recording career. Her 1989 single, "It's Your Move", appeared in the top 100 on the ARIA Singles Chart. She acted, briefly, in season one of Round the Twist (1989), a children's TV comedy series. In October 2018 Abeyratne confirmed that she is due to reform I'm Talking in support of Bryan Ferry's Australian tour from February to April.

== Biography ==
=== 1961–1988: Early life, Models and I'm Talking ===
Suzanne (later shortened to Zan) Abeyratne and her identical twin sister, Sherine Abeyratne, were born in 1961 in London. Their Sri Lankan-born parents, also have two sons; their mother entertained her children by playing piano and with her dancing, while their father shared his admiration of Louis Armstrong and jazz music. After moving from London, the family lived in Sri Lanka for "several years" before migrating to Australia. Both sisters became vocalists in bands both together, and separately, from 1978. They were members of Grand Wazoo, Sherine left to become a backing vocalist for Jo Jo Zep and then INXS, while Zan became a member of Bang.

From 1983 to 1985 Abeyratne provided backing vocals for fellow Melbourne-based group, Models, including their single, "God Bless America" (April 1984), and appeared in the related music video and toured in support of that group's fourth studio album, Out of Mind, Out of Sight (August 1985). The Abeyratne twins were in the music video for Models single, "Barbados" (March 1985). The pair also worked on a record by Kids in the Kitchen. During her time with I'm Talking they performed, "Lead the Way", at the Oz for Africa concert in July 1985. They appeared before Charles and Diana at the Rockin' the Royals concert in Melbourne in November 1985, which was head-lined by INXS and included Models and Kids in the Kitchen.

In 1984, Abeyratne joined Melbourne-based pop music group, I'm Talking. That group had formed in the previous year by Kate Ceberano on lead vocals (ex-Expozay, Hoagy Cats), Stephen Charlesworth on keyboards, Ian Cox on saxophone, Robert Goodge on guitar, Barbara Hogarth on bass guitar and Cameron Newman on drums. Cox, Goodge and Hogarth were all ex-members of Essendon Airport, an electronic, post-punk band. Abeyratne was recorded on I'm Talking's single, "Trust Me" (November 1984), with Ceberano on lead vocals. Abeyratne provided lead vocals for "Holy Word" (July 1986), the second single from the group's debut album, Bear Witness (August). It peaked at No. 9 in Australia, and No. 21 in New Zealand.

Goodge described how Abeyratne was chosen for "Holy Word"'s vocals, "Kate wasn't available for the demos. Up until then Zan had resisted being a full time member, I guess we wanted to reward her as being part of the band and for all the work she'd done." She recalled, "It was awesome for me to get to sing that song. It was a special song for me. It came out and we got whisked off overseas so I didn't get to fully experience it all." Abeyratne toured internationally with the band and they returned for the Australian Made tour in December 1986 and the following January, before she left the group in March 1987.

=== 1989–1994: Zan solo career ===
Abeyratne's debut solo dance/pop single, "It's Your Move", was released via Mushroom Records/Festival Records under the mononym, Zan, in February 1989. It was co-written by Clyde Lieberman and Eliot Lewis, and was recorded in Los Angeles with Richard James Burgess producing. It peaked at number 82 on the ARIA Singles Chart. She followed with "Good Love", in November, but it did not reach the top 100. It was written by Paul Francis Gray (of Wa Wa Nee) and was produced by Todd Hunter (of Dragon).

Her next single, "Nobody Else", was released in March 1991, which was written by Ashley Cadell (ex-Flotsam Jetsam) and was covered by her next band, Mercy Mercy, which included her sister.

=== 1995–2017: Xan solo career ===
Abeyratne followed with "You're So Vain" in February 1995. Working as Xan, she released a solo album of the same name in 1995 via Amber Records/Polydor Records. It provided two singles, "Make It" and "Run Away Girl", in the same year. The album was co-produced by Abeyratne with Bob Brockmann. In October 2013 she was the featured vocalist on "Risin' Up" by StrictLove.

=== 2018–present: I'm Talking reformation and tour ===
In March 2018 I'm Talking's album, Bear Witness, was remastered and re-released on CD as well as an expanded version of 2× CDs with bonus tracks. In October 2018 Abeyratne confirmed that I'm Talking is due to reform, in support of Bryan Ferry's Australian tour, from February to April 2019. Joining her were Ceberano, Charlesworth, Goodge and Hogarth.

== Discography ==
=== Studio albums ===
List of studio albums, with selected details
Title	Album details
Xan (by Xan)	Released: 1995; Format: CD, cassette; Label: Amber/Polydor (529 022-2)

=== Singles ===
List of singles, with selected chart positions
Title	Year	Peak chart positions	Album
Title	Year	AUS	Album
Credited as Zan
"It's Your Move"	1989	82	Non-album singles
"Good Love"	1989	134	Non-album singles
"Nobody Else"	1991	—	Non-album singles
Credited as Xan
"Make It"	1995	—	Xan
"Run Away Girl"	1995	—	Xan
