= Missing Me (Electric Pandas song) =

Single by Electric Pandas

from the album Point Blank
- A-side: "Missing Me"
- B-side: "20 Revolutionaries"
- Released: July 1985
- Studio: Trafalgar Studios
- Genre: Pop music, Indie rock
- Length: 3:21
- Label: Regular Records
- Songwriter(s): Lin Buckfield
- Producer(s): Charles Fisher

Electric Pandas singles chronology
"Big Girls" (1984)	"Missing Me" (1985)	"Italian Boys" (1985)

"Missing Me" is a song written by Lin Buckfield and recorded by the Australian band Electric Pandas. It was released in July 1985 as the second single lifted from the band's debut album, Point Blank. The song peaked at number 41 on the Australian Kent Music Report.

In July 1985, Electric Pandas performed "Missing Me" for the Oz for Africa concert (part of the global Live Aid program). It was broadcast in Australia (on both Seven Network and Nine Network) and on MTV in the US.

== Track listing ==
7" Single (K 9781)

- Side A "Missing Me"
- Side B "20 Revolutionaries"

== Charts ==
Chart (1985)	Peak position
Australia (Kent Music Report)	41
