= Intimacy (song) =

- 7" sleeve

Single by Machinations

from the album Uptown
- B-side: "Hit by a Missile"
- Released: May 1988
- Recorded: 1988
- Studio: Studios 301, Sydney
- Genre: Pop rock; pop
- Label: White Label
- Songwriter(s): Fred Loneragan; Tony Starr; Nick Swan; Tim Doyle
- Producer(s): Andy Wallace

Machinations singles chronology
"Do to You" (1987)	"Intimacy" (1988)	"Do It to Me" (1988)

"Intimacy" is a song recorded by the Australian synth-pop band Machinations. It was released in May 1988 as the second single from the band's third studio album, Uptown. The song peaked at number 40 on the Australian ARIA Chart.

== Track listing ==
7" single (K 548)

- Side A "Intimacy"
- Side B "Hit by a Missile"

12" single (X 14601)

- Side A1 "Intimacy" (extended mix)
- Side A2 "Intimacy" (dub mix)
- Side B1 "Intimacy" (instrumental)
- Side B2 "Hit by a Missile"

== Charts ==
Chart (1988)	Peak position
Australia (ARIA)	40
