= Do to You =

- 7" sleeve

Single by Machinations

from the album Uptown
- B-side: "Looking Out for You"
- Released: August 1987
- Recorded: 1987
- Studio: Studios 301, Sydney
- Genre: Pop rock; pop
- Length: 3:58
- Label: White Label
- Songwriter(s): Fred Loneragan; Tony Starr; Nick Swan; Tim Doyle
- Producer(s): Andy Wallace

Machinations singles chronology
"Execution of Love" (1985)	"Do to You" (1987)	"Intimacy" (1988)

"Do to You" is a song recorded by the Australian synth-pop band Machinations. It was released in August 1987 as the lead single from the band's third studio album, Uptown. The song peaked at number 15 on the Australian Kent Music Report, becoming the band's second top 20 single.

A remixed 12" single was released in September 1987.

Australian band Infusion released a dance remix containing a sample of this track, "Do to You (In '82)" in 2004, which appeared on their album Six Feet Above Yesterday.

== Track listing ==
7" single (K 364)

- Side A "Do to You" – 3:58
- Side B "Looking Out for You" – 4:48

12" single (X 14506)

- Side A1 "Do to You" (The Pee Wee cut)
- Side B1 "Done"
- Side B2 "Looking Out for You" – 4:48

Fresh Berry mix 12" single (X 14530)

- Side A1 "Do to You" (Fresh Berry mix)
- Side B1 "Do to You" (Jam & Cream mix)
- Side B2 "Do to You" (Slam Jam mix)

== Charts ==
=== Weekly charts ===
Chart (1987)	Peak position
Australia (Kent Music Report)	15

=== Year-end charts ===
Chart (1987)	Position
Australia (Kent Music Report)	77
