= Point Blank (Electric Pandas album) =

Studio album by Electric Pandas
- Released: September 1985
- Studio: Trafalgar Studios, Sydney
- Genre: Pop rock, pop
- Label: Regular Records
- Producer: Charles Fisher

Singles from Point Blank
- 1. "Big Girls" Released: May 1984; 2. "Missing Me" Released: July 1985; 3. "Italian Boys" Released: October 1985

Point Blank is the first and only studio album by Australian band Electric Pandas. The album was released in September 1985 by Regular Records and peaked at No. 22 on the Australian Album Charts.

Regular Records re-issued the album on CD for release in 1993, however very few copies are known to exist and it is now one of the most collectible albums on CD by an Australian Band, generally fetching over AU$1000 on sites such as ebay on the rare occasion that it has surfaced for sale. The album was also released digitally by Laneway Music in 2016.

== Track listing ==
LP (L 38437)

Side A
No.	Title	Writer(s)	Length
1.	"Italian Boys"	Lin Buckfield	3:17
2.	"Another Day"	Buckfield, Tim Walter	2:27
3.	"Missing Me"	Buckfield	3:30
4.	"Sundays"	Buckfield	3:09
5.	"Let's Gamble"	Buckfield, Walter, Warren Slater	3:39

Side B
No.	Title	Writer(s)	Length
1.	"Same Mistakes"	Buckfield	3:23
2.	"Sobbing"	Buckfield	2:59
3.	"Advice"	Buckfield	3:10
4.	"Big Girls"	Buckfield	3:10
5.	"Pinned Down"	Buckfield	3:00
6.	"Not Bitter"	Buckfield	2:32

== Weekly charts ==
Chart (1985)	Peak position
Australian (Kent Music Report)	22
