= Uptown (Machinations album) =

Studio album by Machinations
- Released: October 1988
- Genre: Pop rock, pop
- Label: White
- Producer: Andy Wallace

Machinations chronology
| The Big Beat (1986) | Uptown (1988) |

Singles from Uptown
- 1. "Do to You" Released: August 1987; 2. "Intimacy" Released: May 1988; 3. "Do It To Me" Released: October 1988; 4. "Cars and Planes" Released: February 1989

Uptown is the third and final studio album from Australian synthpop band Machinations. The album was released in October 1988 and peaked at number 50 on the ARIA Charts.

== Reception ==
Juke said, "If Uptown was released as the work of some overseas studio band, rather than that of a talent honed on the Aussie pub circuit, it would be heard in the hippest clubs in Darlinghurst and Carlton, instead of grinding themselves into the beer-soaked carpet."

== Track listing ==
Side A
| No. | Title | Length |
|---|---|---|
| 1. | "Intimacy" | 3:41 |
| 2. | "Heartache" | 3:19 |
| 3. | "Do to You" | 4:13 |
| 4. | "Carpet at Daylight" | 3:35 |
| 5. | "Give It Up" | 4:05 |
| 6. | "I Can't Control Myself" | 3:18 |

Side B
| No. | Title | Length |
|---|---|---|
| 1. | "Uptown" | 4:51 |
| 2. | "Three Ways" | 4:28 |
| 3. | "Cars and Planes" | 3:33 |
| 4. | "Do It to Me" | 4:06 |
| 5. | "Normal" | 4:10 |

== Charts ==
| Chart (1988) | Peak position |
|---|---|
| Australian Albums (ARIA) | 50 |
