= Holy Word =

- 7" single

Single by I'm Talking

from the album Bear Witness
- A-side: "Holy Word"
- B-side: "Holy Word"
- Released: 28 July 1986
- Genre: Electronic music, Pop rock, Synth-pop
- Length: 4:25
- Label: Regular Records
- Songwriter(s): Robert Goodge, Ian Cox
- Producer(s): I'm Talking, Martyn Webster

I'm Talking singles chronology
"Do You Wanna Be?" (1986)	"Holy Word" (1986)	"How Can It Be?" (1986)

"Holy Word" is a song by Australian band I'm Talking. It was released in July 1986 as the second single from the band's debut studio album, Bear Witness. The song peaked at number 9 on the Australian Kent Music Report, becoming the band's third top ten single. Unlike their previous singles, group member Zan Abeyratne sings lead vocal on this track.

At the time of the recording, there were tensions that would eventually spell the end of the group as regular lead singer, Kate Ceberano was absent from the recording of the single, resulting in Abeyratne taking over the lead. In an interview with The Herald Sun, Ceberano remembers that missing those sessions, "will always be a thorn in my side." Lead guitarist and composer, Robert Goodge advising that "Up until then Zan had resisted being a full time member, I guess we wanted to reward her as being part of the band and for all the work she'd done."

In a 2009 interview Ceberano discussed how the introduction of Abeyratne as a co-lead singer instantly put her "nose went out of joint but I never felt like I was in a position to say so, because it would’ve felt like I was having a diva spat. To add insult to injury, (1986 hit) 'Holy Word' was given to her, when that was gonna be my fucking song – that was gonna be my hit!" Subsequently Ceberano in her autobiography, I'm Talking: My Life, My Words, My Music (2014), recalls "...the boys wrote a song especially for Zan. It was 'Holy Word'. As soon as I heard it, I knew it was going to be big. I didn't think she deserved it. As far as I was concerned, she had come between the rest of us and had been rewarded with a hit single."

On the other hand, Abeyratne says "It was awesome for me to get to sing that song... It was a special song for me. It came out and we got whisked off overseas so I didn't get to fully experience it all."

The song's accompanying video, directed by MacGregor Knox (Art Director on Richard Lowenstein's 1984 film, Strikebound and video director of Crowded House's "Weather with You"), was filmed in a Melbourne night club, Chasers, on Chapel Street, and featured a young Magda Szubanski among the dancers. The single also appeared on the soundtrack to the 1987 horror film Howling III during a club scene.

The 12" remix was recorded at Britannia Row, Pink Floyd’s studio in London, with Martyn Webster. Goodge recalls that "during recording a somewhat annoying geezer kept popping in to listen to what we were up to, again and again. We were wondering who this interloper was and were just about to tell him to piss off in our best Strine accents when [Webster] whispered it was Nick the drummer from Pink Floyd….oops!"

In February 2020, the group released a 6-track remix single of "Holy Word". The song was remixed by Dr. Packer, Filthy Lucre (comprising Gavin Campbell, DJ Paul Main and Goodge, who were also responsible for the 1991 remix of Yothu Yindi's single, "Treaty", known as "Treaty (Filthy Lucre remix)") and YolaDisko (Melbourne based producers Jolyon Petch and Jesus Loyola).

== Track listing ==
7" Single (K 39)

- Side A "Holy Word" - 4:25
- Side B "Holy Word" (instrumental) - 4:25

12" Single (X 13262)

- Side A "Holy Word" (Dance mix)
- Side B1 "Holy Word" - 4:25
- Side B2 "Holy Word" (instrumental) - 4:25

Remixes single

1. "Holy Word" (Dr. Packer remix) - 6:46
2. "Holy Word" (Filthy Lucre remix) - 6:40
3. "Holy Word" (YolaDisko remix) - 4:34
4. "Holy Word" (Dr. Packer remix - Radio edit) - 3:32
5. "Holy Word" (Filthy Lucre remix - Radio edit) - 3:55
6. "Holy Word" (YolaDisko remix - Radio edit) - 3:23

== Charts ==
=== Weekly charts ===
Chart (1986)	Peak position
Australia (Kent Music Report)	9
New Zealand (Recorded Music NZ)	21

=== Year-end charts ===
Chart (1986)	Position
Australia (Kent Music Report)	87
