= Electric Pandas =

Australian pop rock band

- Origin: Sydney, New South Wales, Australia
- Genres: Pop, rock
- Years active: 1983–1987, 2025-present
- Labels: Regular, Festival, Laneway Music
- Past members: see members list below

Electric Pandas are an Australian pop rock band, fronted by vocalist, guitarist and songwriter Lin Buckfield, which formed in Sydney in 1983. Fellow founders were Warren Slater on bass guitar, Mark Stinson on drums and Tim Walter on guitar. Their first release was the single "Big Girls" in 1984 on Regular Records, which peaked into the Top 10 on the Sydney charts. It was followed up by an EP, Let's Gamble. Electric Pandas' only album Point Blank was released in September 1985, which peaked at No. 22 on the Australian Kent Music Report Albums Chart. After Electric Pandas disbanded in 1987, Buckfield worked in television, eventually on Australian Broadcasting Corporation's Four Corners from 2000.

== Biography ==
Electric Pandas were formed in Sydney in 1983 and comprised Lin Buckfield on vocals and guitar, Tim 'Pretty Boy' Walter on guitar, Warren Slater on bass guitar and Mark 'Hips' Stinson on drums. Buckfield came up with the name as a reference to the English punk rock outfit Exotic Pandas. Buckfield had known that band whilst living in the United Kingdom during the late 1970s, and drew upon their sound to a degree in the Electric Pandas' early work.

The band were signed to the Regular Records label and their debut single, "Big Girls", written by Buckfield, was released in April 1984. The track was featured on commercial radio play lists and music commentator, Molly Meldrum, raved about Electric Pandas on Australian Broadcasting Corporation (ABC) pop music show Countdown. "Big Girls" peaked at No. 18 on the Kent Music Report for Australian singles charts by mid-year. A relentless touring schedule led up to the release of Electric Pandas' debut EP, Let's Gamble, in November 1984. The EP peaked at No. 81 on national charts. Prior to entering the studio to record their debut album, the band underwent significant changes with an entirely new line-up consisting of Buckfield, Craig Wachholz (Dee Minor and the Dischords), Marcel Chaloupka (Smith, Moving Parts), and Phillip Campbell on drums. Campbell and Wachholz both finished off recording tracks for the album with producer Charles Fisher in Sydney. Prior to the album's release Buckfield issued a duet single, "R.O.C.K." / "Under My Thumb", with James Reyne (Australian Crawl) for the Freestyle label in April 1985, which peaked at No. 44 on the charts. "Missing Me" was released in July 1985 and reached No. 41 on the charts. In July 1985, Electric Pandas performed two of their hit songs, "Missing Me" and "Let's Gamble", for the Oz for Africa concert (part of the global Live Aid program). It was broadcast in Australia (on both Seven Network and Nine Network) and on MTV in the US.

Electric Pandas released their debut album, Point Blank, in September 1985, which peaked at No. 22 on the Australian charts in November. "Italian Boys" was issued as the third single and peaked at No. 90. The line-up continued to change with Brad Holmes replacing Campbell, Marshall McAdam replacing Chaloupka on bass guitar and the addition of Charlie Chan on keyboards expanding Electric Pandas to a quintet.

The new line-up filmed videos, guest-hosted an episode of Countdown, and toured Australia. However, they did not release any new material although they recorded an ad for Coca-Cola in 1985. The jingle – concurrent with the "Coke is It!" campaign – was an English-language, rock-music remake of the Brazilian song "Águas de março", and was used for TV spots and on RCA/Columbia Pictures/Hoyts videos such as Ghostbusters.

Electric Pandas disbanded in April 1987. Buckfield and Wachholz, formed indie band F.O.O.D with former Dee Minor and the Dischords bass player Spole. F.O.O.D released a self-titled EP on Shock Records and then Buckfield and song writing partner Wachholz formed another band, Happy House. They recorded another Fisher-produced EP, Passion, with the single "Whatuwannadothatfor" released which gained support from 2JJJ but did not achieve mainstream chart success. Buckfield and Wachholz continued their song writing partnership along with touring Happy House both around Australia and across the UK, Europe and North America.

Buckfield became a current affairs researcher with Australia's Nine Network, then a television reporter, eventually working on ABC-TV's Four Corners. She played in another band called MisChalin, and then in a Sydney band, Bully Girls, with Wachholz joining on guitar for live performances.

Wachholz went on to found Lets Go Surfing – Bondi Surf School and plays in reformed Dee Minor & The Dischords.

Electric Pandas' keyboard player Charlie Chan signed as an artist with Sony Classical.

Electric Pandas reformed in 2025.

== Members ==
- Lin Buckfield – vocals, guitar (1983–1987, 2025–present)
- Warren Slater – bass (1983–1984)
- Mark Stinson – drums (1983–1984)
- Tim Walter – guitar (1983–1984)
- Phillip Campbell – drums (1985–1986)
- Marcel Chaloupka – bass (1985–1986)
- Craig Karl Wacholz – guitar (1985–1987)
- Charlie Chan – keyboards (1986–1987)
- Marshall McAdam - bass (1986-1987)
- Brad Holmes – drums (1986–1987)
- Neil McDonald – vocals (1986–1987)
- Lin Buckfield – vocals, guitar (2023–present)
- Craig Karl Wacholz – guitar (2023–present)
- Glen Pattison – drums (2023–present)
- Mark Paton – bass (2024-2025)

== Discography ==
=== Albums ===
Year	Album details	Peak chart positions
Year	Album details	AUS
1985	Point Blank: Released: September 1985; Label: Regular Records (L-38437); Format: LP	22

=== Extended Play ===
Year	Album details	Peak chart positions
Year	Album details	AUS
1984	Let's Gamble: Released: November 1984; Label: Randelli Records (RRM 005); Format: LP	81

=== Singles ===
List of singles as lead artist, with selected chart positions and certifications
Year	Title	Peak chart positions	Album
Year	Title	AUS	Album
1984	"Big Girls"	18	Point Blank
1985	"Missing Me"	41	Point Blank
1985	"Italian Boys"	90	Point Blank

== Awards and nominations ==
=== Countdown Australian Music Awards ===
Countdown was an Australian pop music TV series on national broadcaster ABC-TV from 1974–1987, it presented music awards from 1979–1987, initially in conjunction with magazine TV Week. The TV Week / Countdown Awards were a combination of popular-voted and peer-voted awards.

Year	Nominee / work	Award	Result
1984	themselves	Most Promising Talent	Nominated
