= Do You Wanna Be? =

- 7" single

Single by I'm Talking

from the album Bear Witness
- A-side: "Do You Wanna Be?"
- B-side: "Do You Wanna Be? (Instrumental)"
- Released: 5 May 1986
- Length: 4:10
- Label: Regular Records
- Songwriter(s): Robert Goodge, Ian Cox
- Producer(s): I'm Talking, Martyn Webster

I'm Talking singles chronology
"Love Don't Live Here Anymore" (1985)	"Do You Wanna Be?" (1986)	"Holy Word" (1986)

"Do You Wanna Be?" is a song by Australian band I'm Talking. It was released in May 1986 as the lead single from the band's debut studio album, Bear Witness. The song peaked at number 8 on the Australian Kent Music Report, becoming the band's highest charting single and second top ten single. An instrumental version of the song was featured in a flat party scene in the 1988 film For Queen and Country.

At the 1986 Countdown Australian Music Awards, Kate Ceberano was nominated for Best Female Performance in a Video.

The song's composer and band's guitarist, Robert Goodge, stated: "Shannon's "Let the Music Play", "Give Me Tonight" and Fonda Rae's "Touch Me" [were] the main influences, but we added in a harmonic structure that was reminiscent of something Chic might do."

== Track listing ==
7" Single (K 9925)

- Side A "Do You Wanna Be?" - 4:10
- Side B "Do You Wanna Be?" (instrumental) - 4:10

12" Single (X 13252)

- Side A "Do You Wanna Be?" (Extended) - 5:15
- Side B1 "Do You Wanna Be?" - 4:10
- Side B2 "Do You Wanna Be?" (instrumental) - 4:10

== Charts ==
=== Weekly charts ===
Chart (1986)	Peak position
Australia (Kent Music Report)	8
New Zealand (Recorded Music NZ)	30

=== Year-end charts ===
Chart (1986)	Position
Australia (Kent Music Report)	73
