= Big Music (Machinations album) =

Studio album by Machinations
- Released: 25 June 1985
- Studio: Rhinoceros Studios
- Genre: Synthpop, New-wave, pop
- Label: White
- Producer: Julian Mendelsohn

Machinations chronology
Esteem (1983)	Big Music (1985)	The Big Beat (1986)

Singles from Big Music
- 1. "No Say in It" Released: August 1984; 2. "My Heart's On Fire" Released: May 1985; 3. "You Got Me Going Again" Released: August 1985; 4. "Execution Of Love" Released: November 1985

Big Music is the second studio album from Australian synthpop band Machinations. The album was released in June 1985 and peaked at number 20 on the Kent Music Report.

== Background and Reception ==
Professional ratings
Review scores
Source	Rating
AllMusic	4/5 stars

Big Music is produced by Julian Mendelsohn who first worked with the band on the single "No Say in It" and who has worked with such British acts as Frankie Goes to Hollywood, Nik Kershaw and Art of Noise. Band member Fred Lonergan said "He was really great to work with [and] we wanted to record the album in November (of 1984) but after working with Julian we decided we would try and get him back out again. March (of 1984) was the earliest we could do it." Lonergan said "Variety is the keyword with this album. On the album we've got a reggae track, a ballad [and] a few dance tracks."

Australian musicologist, Ian McFarlane, declared that the group "[emerged] with the smoothest and most fully realised album of [their] career".

== Track listing ==
Side A
No.	Title	Length
1.	"My Heart's On Fire"	5:00
2.	"Predator"	3:45
3.	"Jabber"	3:50
4.	"Execution of Love"	3:58
5.	"Spark"	5:07

Side B
No.	Title	Length
1.	"No Say in It"	3:19
2.	"Don't Take Me"	4:11
3.	"You Got Me Going Again"	3:37
4.	"5 Minutes Black"	3:33
5.	"The Letter"	6:04

== Charts ==
Chart (1985)	Peak position
Australia (Kent Music Report)	20
