= I'm Talking =

Australian pop band

- Origin: Melbourne, Victoria, Australia
- Genres: Funk, pop
- Years active: 1983–1987; 2018–2020
- Labels: Randelli, Regular, Festival, Bloodlines
- Members: Kate Ceberano; Zan Abeyratne; Robert Goodge; Barbara Hogarth; Stephen Charlesworth; Miles Henry; Brodie Everist
- Past members: Ian Cox; Cameron Newman; Warren McLean; Kevin Wiltshire; John McAll; Philip Jackson; Tricky J Susie Ahern

I'm Talking were an Australian funk-pop rock band, which featured vocalists Kate Ceberano and Zan Abeyratne. They formed in 1983 in Melbourne and provided top ten hit singles "Trust Me", "Do You Wanna Be?" and "Holy Word" and a top fifteen album, Bear Witness, before disbanding in 1987. The group reunited in October 2018, and went on a 2019 tour as well as a series of small venue shows.

== History ==
=== 1983–1987: Bear Witness ===
After the break-up of Melbourne-based experimental funk band Essendon Airport in 1983, members Robert Goodge on guitar, Ian Cox on saxophone and Barbara Hogarth on bass guitar set about forming a band to create inventive, commercial, funk-pop music. I'm Talking's original line-up was Kate Ceberano on vocals (ex-Expozay, Hoagy Cats), Stephen Charlesworth on keyboards, Cox, Goodge, Hogarth and Cameron Newman on drums. They introduced sophisticated dance beat music to the pub rock scene. Their first notable show was at The Club in Collingwood on 16 December 1983. The EP Someday was released in May 1984 on the independent Randelli label. They also contributed to the soundtrack of the short film More Love Stories and songs "Here, There and Everywhere" and "Scratching" on the ABC compilation EP Cooking with George. They attracted the attention of manager Ken West and then signed to Regular Records. Zan Abeyratne (ex-Grand Wazoo, Bang) joined as a second lead vocalist.

I'm Talking released "Trust Me" in November 1984, which peaked at #10 on the Kent Music Report for the Australian singles charts. This was followed by "Lead the Way" in June 1985, then a cover of the Rose Royce song "Love Don't Live Here Anymore" in August, which both entered the top 30. Although their songs were initially credited to the band as a whole (i.e. I'm Talking), in fact Goodge and Cox wrote virtually all the music and lyrics. The group won 'Best New Talent' and 'Best Debut Single' for "Trust Me" for 1984 at the Countdown Awards ceremony broadcast in 1985. On 13 July, I'm Talking performed "Lead the Way" in the 1985 Oz for Africa concert (part of the global Live Aid program). It was broadcast in Australia (on both the Seven Network and Nine Network) and on MTV in the US.

I'm Talking recorded their debut album Bear Witness in Melbourne, and it was released in August 1986. Produced by Fred Maher (known for his work in Material and as drummer for Scritti Politti) and Martyn Webster, it peaked at #14 in the albums charts, and spawned three more singles for their Australian label Regular Records. "Do You Wanna Be?", entered the charts in May and peaked at #8, becoming their highest charting single. "Holy Word", released in July 1986, featured solo vocals by Abeyratne and peaked at #9. "How Can It Be?" was released in October 1986, and although it failed to enter the top 100, it was listed among a list of singles receiving significant sales reports beyond the top 100 in November 1986. They signed to London Records in the UK but disagreements between the band and that label led to "Do You Wanna Be?" being the only single released outside of Oceania. "Holy Word" appeared on the soundtrack to the 1987 horror film Howling III. At least three of their songs later appeared in the 1988 film For Queen & Country.

After returning from their 1986 UK tour supporting Five Star, there were line-up changes, Warren McLean (ex-Machinations) replaced Newman on drums and Kevin Wiltshire was 'imported' from the UK tour as a second keyboardist. That line-up appeared on the national Australian Made tour of January 1987. By March, Abeyratne, Charlesworth and McLean had left. New members were John McAll on keyboards, Philip Jackson on drum machine and electronics, Susie Ahern on backing vocals, and rapper Tricky J (Julien Lodge). New material was performed live by this line-up, but none was recorded. Ceberano won 'Most Popular Female Performer' for 1986 at the final Countdown Awards held in 1987. New material was performed live in 1987, but Ceberano departed to pursue her solo career and I'm Talking disbanded in July 1987. In 1988, a compilation, Dancing was released by Regular Records.

=== 1988–2017: After I'm Talking ===
After the break-up of I'm Talking, Ceberano launched her solo career; Abeyratne released three solo singles. Goodge, Cox and David Chesworth collaborated again in 1990 in the group "Power Trip featuring Mr Larry Weems". Goodge also went into partnership with Gavin Campbell and Paul Main in the '90s to form Filthy Lucre, specialising in remixes. They were responsible for transforming Yothu Yindi's folk-rock song "Treaty" into a dance-groove hit single. Goodge has also written and performed with Stephen Cummings since the 1990s. I'm Talking's manager, West, handled Ceberano for a brief time before going into partnership with Vivian Lees and launching their national rock festival The Big Day Out. John McAll went on to play and record with Goodge's former collaborator David Chesworth, and other jazz and rock acts.

In 2003 Goodge revived a trio of Essendon Airport with David Chesworth and Graham Lee. In 2007 Kate Ceberano appeared in the Countdown Spectacular 2 performing versions of I'm Talking's "Trust Me" and "Love Don't Live Here Anymore". As of 2008 Cox is a conservator at the State Library of Victoria. In October 2010, Bear Witness (1986) was listed in the book, 100 Best Australian Albums.

In 2014, Ceberano released her memoir, I'm Talking: My life, my words, my music, published by Hachette Australia. Ceberano co-wrote the book with Tom Gilling.

=== 2018–present: Reunion and Dyin' to Be Dancin' ===
In March 2018 Bear Witness was re-released with additional tracks, and the band started an official YouTube channel. The album was re-mastered for vinyl, cd, and digital download.

On 16 October 2018, the members of I'm Talking announced their return to the stage in 2019 as the supporting act for Bryan Ferry's Australian tour, between February and April. The reformed lineup consists of five of the seven original members: Goodge, Hogarth, Charlesworth, Ceberano, and Abeyratne. Ian Cox and Cameron Newman did not return due to personal commitments. Ceberano stated that she was "very excited about performing with I'm Talking again after so many years," adding that "[t]he music still sounds so great – fans are gonna love it!" On 9 November 2018, the group performed an acoustic set of cover songs during a segment on Myf Warhurst's ABC Radio program. The group later performed a special concert for their fans in Melbourne on 11 February 2019, which received great reviews. On 15 February 2019, the group released a live album titled Dyin' to Be Dancin, which featured songs from two shows recorded in August 1984 and May 1986. In July 2019, the group released new remixes for the songs "It's Over" (an album track on Bear Witness) and "Cry Me a River" (originally a b-side on the single "Love Don't Live Here Anymore").

In February 2020, the group released a 6-track remix single of "Holy Word".

== Members ==
Summarised from sources:

- Kate Ceberano – vocals (1983–1987, 2019)
- Stephen Charlesworth – keyboards (1983–1987, 2019)
- Ian Cox – saxophone (1983–1987)
- Robert Goodge – guitar (1983–1987, 2019)
- Barbara Hogarth – bass guitar (1983–1987, 2019)
- Cameron Newman – drums (1983–1986)
- Zan Abeyratne – vocals (1984–1987, 2019)
- Warren McLean – drums (1986–1987)
- Kevin Wiltshire – keyboards (1986–1987 session musician)
- John McAll – keyboards (1986-1987)
- Philip Jackson – drum machine, electronics (1987)
- Tricky J (Julien Lodge) – rapping (1987)
- Susie Ahern – backing vocals (1987)
- Miles Henry – drums (2019)
- Brodie Everist – saxophone (2019)

== Discography ==
=== Albums ===
List of albums, with selected chart positions
Title	Details	Peak chart positions	Accreditation
Title	Details	AUS	Accreditation
Bear Witness	Released: 4 August 1986; Label: Regular Records (RML 53202); Format: LP, cassette, CD	14	ARIA: Platinum
Dancing	Released: 12 December 1988; Remix album; Label: Regular (18009); Format: LP, cassette, VHS	—	
Dyin' to Be Dancin' (I'm Talking Live 1984–1986)	Released: 15 February 2019; Live album; Label: Bloodlines (BLOODLP46); Format: LP, download, streaming	—	

=== Extended play ===
List of EP, with selected chart positions
Year	Details
Someday	Released: May 1984; Label: Randelli (RR-84-1); Format: LP

=== Singles ===
List of singles as lead artist, with selected chart positions
Year	Title	Peak chart positions		Album
Year	Title	AUS	NZ	Album
1984	"Trust Me"	10	—	non-album singles
1985	"Lead the Way"	25	—	non-album singles
1985	"Love Don't Live Here Anymore"	21	—	non-album singles
1986	"Do You Wanna Be?"	8	30	Bear Witness
1986	"Holy Word"	9	21	Bear Witness
1986	"How Can It Be?"	—	—	Bear Witness

== Awards and nominations ==
=== ARIA Music Awards ===
The ARIA Music Awards is an annual awards ceremony held by the Australian Recording Industry Association. They commenced in 1987.

Year	Nominee / work	Award	Result
1987	Richard Alan for Bear Witness by I'm Talking	Best Cover Art	Nominated

=== Countdown Music Awards ===
Countdown was an Australian pop music TV series on national broadcaster ABC-TV from 1974–1987, it presented music awards from 1979–1987, initially in conjunction with magazine TV Week. The TV Week / Countdown Awards were a combination of popular-voted and peer-voted awards.

Year	Nominee / work	Award	Result
1984	"Trust Me"	Best Debut Single	Won
1984	Kate Ceberarno in "Trust Me" (I'm Talking)	Best Female Performance in a Video	Nominated
1984	I'm Talking	Most Promising Talent	Won
1986	Bear Witness	Best Debut Album	Nominated
