= Point Blank (band) =

American rock and roll band

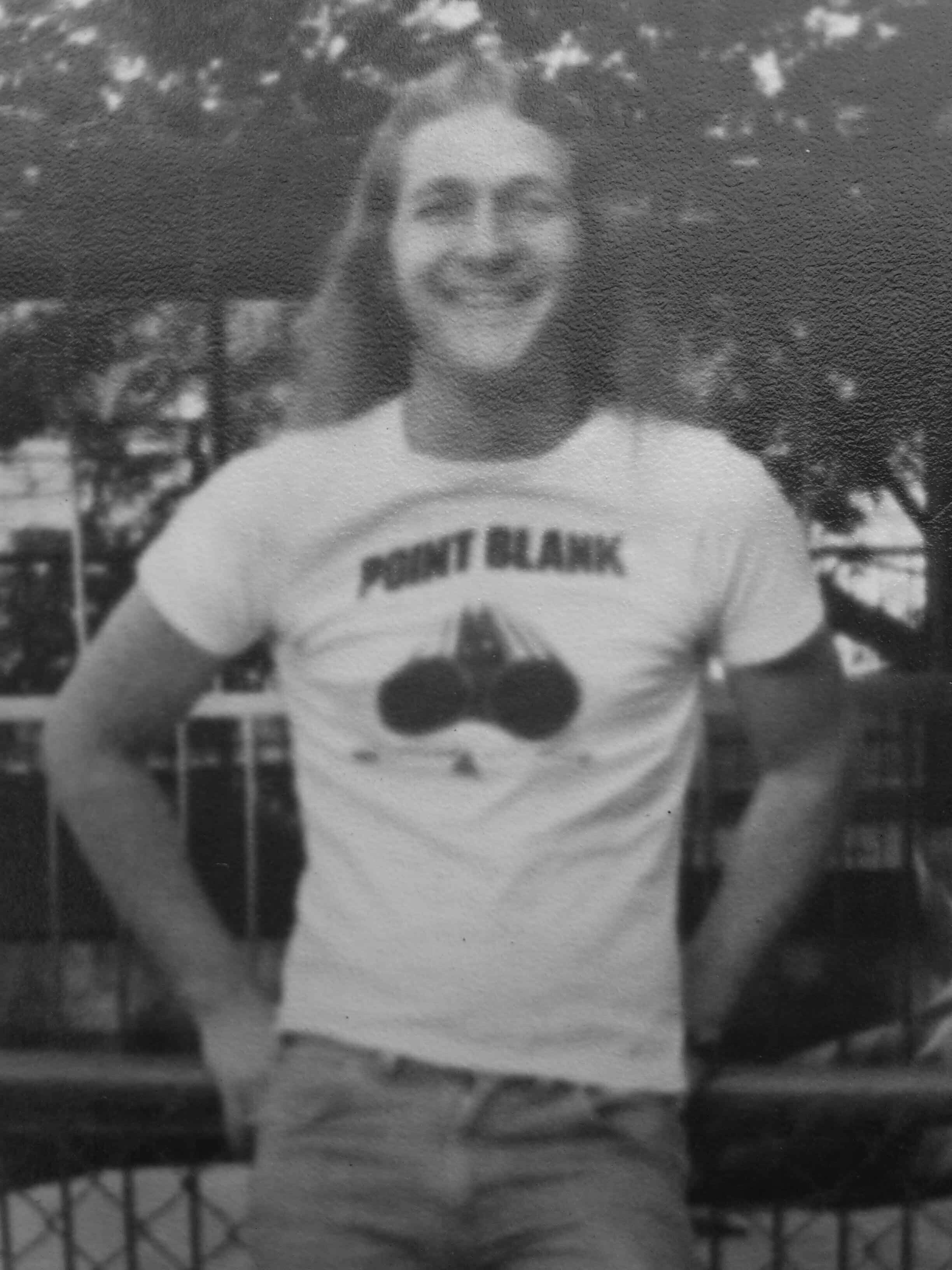
- Richard Heaton, drummer (c. 1974)

Point Blank was an American rock band hailing from Irving, Texas, United States. The band formed in 1974 in Irving, Texas, and recorded six albums between 1974 and 1982. Garnering occasional airplay on AOR radio stations, the band is best known for their only hit single, "Nicole", from 1981. Point Blank broke up in 1983.

== History ==
The band was discovered and managed by Bill Ham's Lone Wolf Productions (ZZ Top, and Eric Johnson). The original six albums were recorded in Memphis with engineer/producer Terry Manning. Point Blank's sound is rooted in southern rock and boogie, but drifted towards hard rock and mainstream AOR by the early 1980s. In 1981, they released their fifth album, American Exce$$, which included the hit single "Nicole". With strong air-play on AOR radio stations the track reached No. 20 on Billboard Magazine's Rock Tracks. Subsequently, "Nicole" was also released as a 45 RPM single and peaked inside the Top 40, at No. 39 on Billboard's Hot 100, before quickly dropping off the chart. In their heyday they were known for playing more than 200 shows per year. In 1982, they released their final album, On A Roll. While the title track reached No. 27 on Billboard's Rock chart, it failed to chart on the Hot 100, and the album itself got no higher than No. 127 on the Hot 200. In 1983 the band broke up.

In late 2009, Point Blank released Fight On!, their first studio album in 27 years. Both the Reloaded and Fight On! albums were released on the Dixiefrog label.

Guitarist Kim Davis died on October 18, 2010, from a self-inflicted gunshot wound, aged 58. James Russell Burns, better known as Rusty Burns, died in Denver from lung cancer on February 19, 2016, aged 63. The singer and a founding member, John O'Daniel, died from cancer on November 17, 2018; he was 70.

Drummer Richard Heaton is the last living original member of Point Blank. Irving Daily News 1975. Richard was known for his powerful playing, distinctive sound, and his early influence with other band members

== Discography ==
=== Albums ===
- Point Blank (Arista, 1976) (US No. 175)
- Second Season (Arista, 1977)
- Airplay (MCA, 1979) (US No. 175)
- The Hard Way (MCA, 1980) (US No. 110)
- American Exce$$ (MCA, 1981) (US No. 80)
- On A Roll (MCA, 1982) (US No. 119)
- Reloaded (Dixiefrog, 2006)
- Fight On! (Dixiefrog, 2009)
- Volume 9 (Fairway, 2014)
- Very Best (2019)

=== Singles ===
- "Let Me Stay With You Tonight" (1981) (US No. 107, US Rock No. 38)
- "Nicole" (1981) (US No. 39, US Rock No. 20)
- "On a Roll" (1982) (US Rock No. 27)
- "Let Her Go" (1982) (US No. 109)
- "Great White Line" (1982) (US Rock No. 34)

== Members ==
- **Bold** = Original members

1974

- **Rusty Burns** – Guitar
- **Kim Davis** – Guitar
- **Phillip Petty** – Bass
- **John O'Daniel** – Vocals
- **Richard Heaton** – Drums

1975

- **Rusty Burns** – Guitar
- **Kim Davis** – Guitar
- **Phillip Petty** – Bass
- **John O'Daniel** – Vocals
- **Richard Heaton** – Drums

1976

- **Rusty Burns** – Guitar
- **Kim Davis** – Guitar
- **John O'Daniel** – Vocals
- **Buzzy Gruen** – Drums
- **Phillip Petty** – Bass

1979

- **Rusty Burns** – Guitar
- **Kim Davis** – Guitar
- **John O'Daniel** – Vocals
- **Buzzy Gruen** – Drums
- Bill Randolph – Bass
- Steve Hardin – Keyboards

1980

- **Rusty Burns** – Guitar
- **Kim Davis** – Guitar
- **John O'Daniel** – Vocals
- **Buzzy Gruen** – Drums
- Bill Randolph – Bass

1981

- **Rusty Burns** – Guitar
- **Kim Davis** – Guitar
- **Buzzy Gruen** – Drums
- Bill Randolph – Bass
- Bubba Keith – Vocals
- Mike Hamilton – Keyboards

2005

- **Rusty Burns** – Guitar
- **John O'Daniel** – Vocals
- Phillip Petty – Bass
- **Buzzy Gruen** – Drums

2007

- **Rusty Burns** – Guitar
- **John O'Daniel** – Vocals
- Phillip Petty – Bass
- Mike Gage – Drums
- Buddy Whittington – Guitar
- Jeff Williams – Piano

2007

- **Rusty Burns** – Guitar
- **John O'Daniel** – Vocals
- Phillip Petty – Bass
- David Crockett – Drums
- Buddy Whittington – Guitar
- Larry Telford – Keyboards

2008

- **Rusty Burns** – Guitar
- **John O'Daniel** – Vocals
- Phillip Petty – Bass
- David Crockett – Drums
- Mouse Mayes – Guitar
- Larry Telford – Keyboards

2012

- **Rusty Burns** – Guitar
- **John O'Daniel** – Vocals
- Mouse Mayes – Guitar
- Larry Telford – Keyboards
- Kirk Powers – Bass
- Greg Hokanson – Drums

2014

- **Rusty Burns** – Guitar
- **John O'Daniel** – Vocals
- Mouse Mayes – Guitar
- Larry Telford – Keyboards
- Kirk Powers – Bass
- Mike Gage – Drums

2016-2018

- **John O'Daniel** – Vocals
- Mouse Mayes – Guitar
- Larry Telford – Keyboards
- Kirk Powers – Bass
- Greg Hokanson – Drums

2025

- Bubba Keith - Vocals, Guitar, Harmonica
- Mike Sauce - Vocals, Guitar
- Tuffy Burkhart - Vocals, Guitar
- Rex Mauney - Keyboards, Backing Vocals
- Mike Mikeska - Drums, Backing Vocals
- Kevin Davis - Bass, Backing Vocals
