= You Got Me Going Again =

- 7" sleeve

Single by Machinations

from the album Big Music
- B-side: "I Ain't Waiting for No Train"
- Released: August 1985
- Recorded: 1985
- Studio: Rhinoceros Studios, Sydney
- Genre: Electronic; synth-pop
- Length: 3:37
- Label: White Label
- Songwriter(s): Fred Loneragan; Tony Starr; Nick Swan; Tim Doyle
- Producer(s): Julian Mendelsohn

Machinations singles chronology
"My Heart's On Fire" (1985)	"You Got Me Going Again" (1985)	"Execution of Love" (1985)

"You Got Me Going Again" is a song recorded by the Australian synth-pop band Machinations. It was released in August 1985 as the third single from the band's second studio album, Big Music. The song peaked at number 39 on the Australian Kent Music Report.

== Track listing ==
7" single (K 9784)

- Side A "You Got Me Going Again" – 3:37
- Side B "I Ain't Waiting for No Train"

12" single (X 13219)

- Side A "You Got Me Going Again" (extended)
- Side B1 "You Got Me Going Again" (Sing-A-Long with Naomi)
- Side B2 "You Got Me Going Again" (Sing-A-Long without)

== Charts ==
Chart (1985)	Peak position
Australia (Kent Music Report)	39
