= Jumping the Gap =

- 7" sleeve

Single by Machinations
- B-side: "Terminal Wharf"
- Released: October 1983
- Recorded: 1983
- Studio: Albert Studios, Sydney
- Genre: New wave; synth-pop
- Length: 4:07
- Label: White Label
- Songwriter(s): Fred Loneragan; Tony Starr; Nick Swan; Tim Doyle
- Producer(s): Bruce Brown; Russell Dunlop

Machinations singles chronology
"Pressure Sway" (1983)	"Jumping the Gap" (1983)	"No Say in It" (1984)

"Jumping the Gap" is a song recorded by the Australian synth-pop band Machinations. It was released in October 1983 and peaked at number 59 on the Australian Kent Music Report.

== Track listing ==
7" single (K 9219)

- Side A "Jumping the Gap" – 4:07
- Side B "Terminal Wharf" – 5:28

12" single (X 13128)

- Side A1 "Jumping the Gap" (extended version) – 5:00
- Side B1 "Jumping the Gap" (dub mix) – 4:10
- Side B2 "Average Inadequacy" (club mix) – 5:20

== Charts ==
Chart (1983–84)	Peak position
Australia (Kent Music Report)	59
