= Australian Made =

1986–1987 Australian concert series

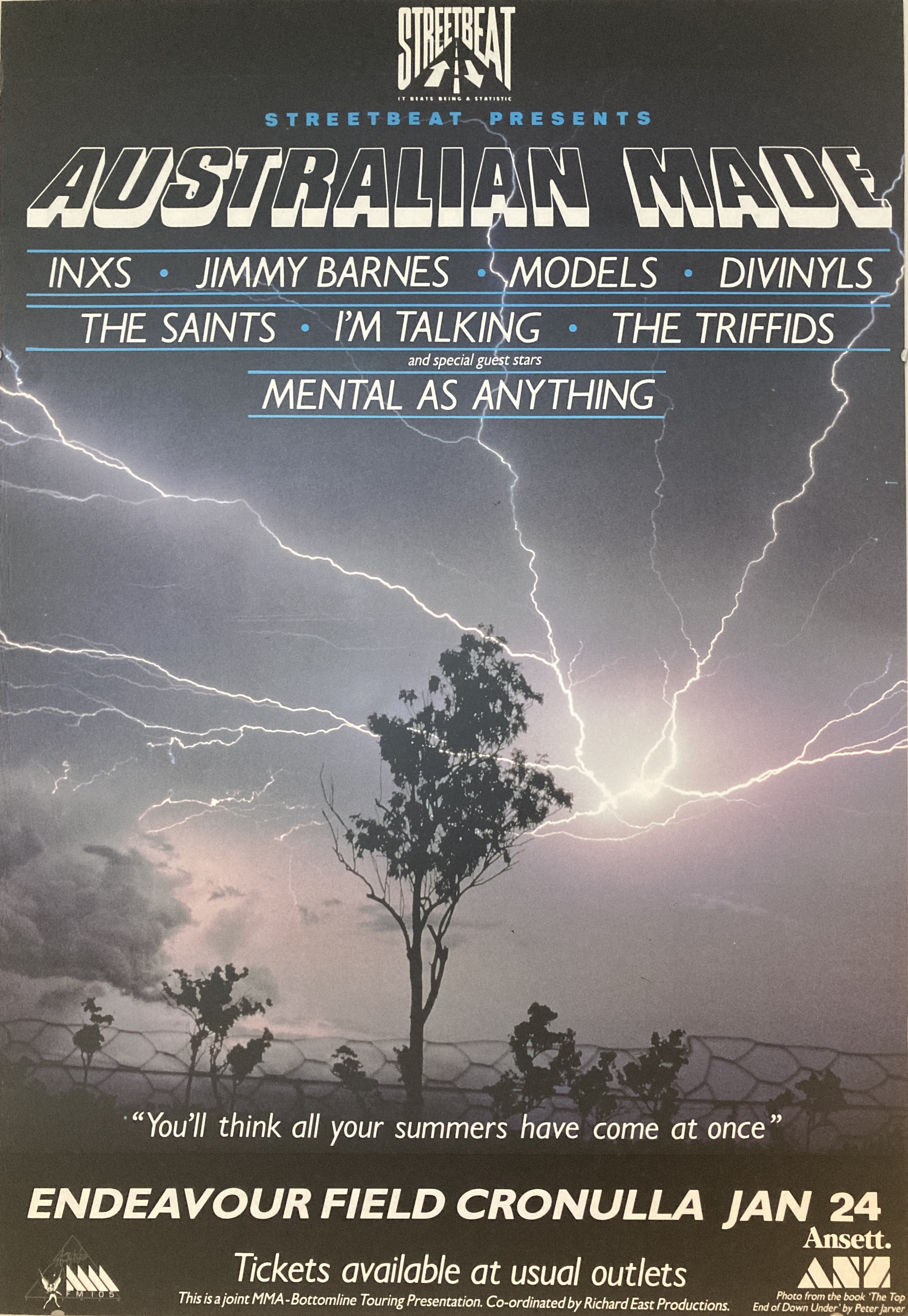
- Promotional poster for the Sydney concert
- Genre: Rock; new wave; pub rock
- Dates: 26 December 1986 – 26 January 1987
- Locations: Australia: Hobart (26 December 1986); Adelaide (1 January 1987); Melbourne (3 January 1987); Perth (10 January 1987); Brisbane (17 January 1987); Sydney (26 January 1987)
- Years active: 1986–1987
- Founders: Chris Murphy; Mark Pope; Michael Gudinski; Ken West
- Organiser: Chris Murphy; Mark Pope

Australian Made was a festival concert series held during 1986–1987 in the six state capitals of Australia and featured local rock acts Mental as Anything, I'm Talking, The Triffids, The Saints, Divinyls, Models, INXS and Jimmy Barnes. The series started in Hobart on 26 December 1986 and concluded in Sydney on 26 January 1987. Rock journalist Jeff Jenkins rated it as one of his 50 most significant events in Australian music history, "It wasn't a huge success, but it showed that an all-Australian festival could work." Australian Made was conceived to counter tours of international acts, like Dire Straits' 1985–1986 world tour, which were drying up funds for Australian groups. As from October 2010, the following artists have been inducted into the ARIA Hall of Fame: INXS and The Saints (both in 2001), Barnes (as a member of Cold Chisel in 1995 and solo in 2005), Divinyls (2006), The Triffids (2008), Mental As Anything (2009), and Models (2010).

To promote the tour, INXS and Barnes recorded a cover of The Easybeats song "Good Times" which was released in December 1986 as a single and used as the theme song. "Good Times" peaked at No. 2 on the Australian charts. The single peaked at No. 47 in the United States Billboard Hot 100 on 1 August 1987.

At the Sydney concert, Peter Trotter, playing saxophone for Mental As Anything, collapsed on stage and died a week later. The tour had a budget of $3.25 million, and was announced with claims of Australian mateship and cooperation; however arguments ensued between various band managers over the proposed concert series film. The tour ended in acrimony with two managers, Chris Murphy (for INXS) and Jeremy Fabinyi (for Mental As Anything), arguing backstage in Sydney and coming to blows. A film of the tour, Australian Made: The Movie, directed by Richard Lowenstein, was released in July 1987, but contained no footage of Mental As Anything performing. Rock historian Glenn A. Baker and Bob King wrote Australian Made, Gonna Have a Good Time Tonight : The Authorised Documentary of the Event in 1987 with detailed notations by Baker and photographs by King. According to rock music historian, Ian McFarlane, "the tour drew record crowds across the country. It was the first travelling festival tour to feature exclusively Australian bands".

== Background ==
Dire Straits, and other international acts, mounted Australia-wide tours in 1986 with promoters claiming that local acts couldn't fill large concert venues. Acts like INXS and Jimmy Barnes felt that a tour by internationally renowned Australians would fill these venues. In October 1986, Chris Murphy, of Mark Murphy Agency (MMA) and manager of INXS, Mark Pope, who managed Jimmy Barnes and Divinyls, and Mushroom Records boss Michael Gudinski, commenced negotiations to develop the Australian Made tour. Other promoters came on-board including Richard MacDonald and Gary Grant. Mushroom Records had released material by Models, managed by Murphy, while their touring partners I'm Talking were managed by Ken West and had released material on Regular Records. These band managers used their record labels and industry contacts to provide other local acts that had toured internationally, The Saints, The Triffids and Mental As Anything. The Triffids' guitarist Graham Lee stated that Hutchence had insisted on them being part of the bill, on the basis of their international success, even though they were not well renowned in Australia.

To promote the tour, INXS and Barnes (ex-Cold Chisel) recorded two songs, a cover of The Easybeats song "Good Times", and "Laying Down the Law" which Barnes co-wrote with INXS members Garry Gary Beers, Andrew Farriss, Jon Farriss, Michael Hutchence and Kirk Pengilly. Both songs were recorded, with "Laying Down the Law" also written, and "Good Times" film clip made, all on the same day. Tim Farriss, INXS lead guitarist, was unavailable for the recordings, as he was unable to be contacted due to fishing commitments. The single peaked at No. 2 on the Australian charts, and months later was featured in the Joel Schumacher 1987 film The Lost Boys and the associated The Lost Boys soundtrack. This allowed it to peak at No. 47 in the United States on 1 August 1987. The tour had a budget of $3.25 million, when the accounts were finally tabulated the promoters had lost $30,000 each. After the tour, there was a dispute over the royalty split on "Good Times". Four years later the single appeared on the British charts when The Lost Boys was released on video.

Barnes stated that the Subiaco concert had the best Rock 'N' Roll crowd he had ever seen. With the exception of keyboard player, Peter Kekel, Barnes employed an all Canadian backing band, that he had used for his own North American tours from 1985, for the Australian Made tour. All the acts travelled between capital cities on the same plane. Chrissy Amphlett of Divinyls wrote about the tour in her autobiography, Pleasure and Pain, she was impressed that various band members got along so well.

At the Sydney concert, Peter Trotter, playing trombone for Mental As Anything, collapsed on stage and died a week later. The tour was announced with claims of Australian mateship and cooperation, however arguments ensued between various band managers over the proposed concert series film. Some bands felt they had been coerced into unfavourable tour contracts. The tour ended in acrimony with two managers, Chris Murphy (for INXS) and Jeremy Fabinyi (for Mental As Anything), arguing backstage in Sydney and coming to blows. After the Sydney concert, Rick Grossman, bass guitarist of Divinyls, was fired from the group due to his heroin addiction, he attended the drug rehab centre, The Buttery, and eventually joined Hoodoo Gurus in 1988. The film of the tour, Australian Made: The Movie, directed by Richard Lowenstein, was released in July 1987, was shown in cinemas, and released on VHS home video, but contained no footage of Mental As Anything performing. An edited DVD version, Australian Made: Featuring INXS Live (a.k.a. INXS: Australian Made) was released in May 2008. In 1987 the book Australian Made was also published as a companion to the movie.

The 30th Anniversary Edition aired on the ABC in October 2021.

Over subsequent years almost all the artists from the Australian Made tour have become inductees into the ARIA Hall of Fame: INXS and The Saints were both inducted in 2001, Barnes was first inducted as a member of Cold Chisel in 1995 and then as a solo artist in 2005, Divinyls in 2006, The Triffids in 2008, Mental As Anything in 2009, and Models in 2010.

== Venues and dates ==
1. King George V Oval, Hobart – 26 December 1986
2. Thebarton Oval, Adelaide – 1 January 1987
3. Olympic Park, Melbourne – scheduled for 3 January, delayed due to weather – 4 January
4. Subiaco Oval, Perth – 10 January
5. Chandler Velodrome, Brisbane – 17 January
6. Endeavour Field, Sydney – 26 January

== The bands ==
Line-ups of the various bands in order of appearance:

- Mental As Anything – Peter O'Doherty, Reg Mombassa, Martin Plaza, Greedy Smith, David Twohill, Peter Trotter.
- I'm Talking – Zan Abeyratne, Kate Ceberano, Stephen Charlesworth, Ian Cox, Robert Goodge, Barbara Hogarth, Warren McLean, Kevin Wiltshire.
- The Triffids – Jill Birt, Martyn Casey, Graham Lee, Alsy MacDonald, David McComb, Robert McComb.
- The Saints – Chris Bailey, Richard Burgman, Ivor Hay, Arturo Larizza.
- Divinyls – Chrissy Amphlett, Rick Grossman, Richard Harvey, Mark McEntee, Bjarne Ohlin, Frank Infante.
- Models – James Freud, Sean Kelly, Roger Mason, Barton Price, James Valentine. Included Mary Azzapardi, Karen Bodington, Wendy Matthews on backing vocals.
- Jimmy Barnes – Jimmy Barnes, Peter Kekel.
- INXS – Garry Gary Beers, Andrew Farriss, Jon Farriss, Tim Farriss, Michael Hutchence, Kirk Pengilly.

== Certifications ==
Region	Certification	Certified units/sales
Australia (ARIA)	Platinum	15,000^{^}
^{^} Shipments figures based on certification alone.
