= Trust Me (I'm Talking song) =

Single by I'm Talking
- A-side: "Trust Me"
- B-side: "Take It to the Bridge"
- Released: 26 November 1984
- Recorded: October 1984
- Studio: AAV, Melbourne
- Genre: Synth-pop
- Length: 3:41
- Label: Regular
- Songwriters: Kate Ceberano; Stephen Charlesworth; Ian Cox; Robert Goodge; Barbara Hogarth; Cameron Newman
- Producers: I'm Talking, Ross Cockle

I'm Talking singles chronology
"Trust Me" (1984)	"Lead the Way" (1985)

"Trust Me" is the debut single written and recorded by the Australian band I'm Talking, released in November 1984. The line-up was Zan Abeyratne on backing vocals, Kate Ceberano on lead vocals, Stephen Charlesworth on keyboards, Ian Cox on saxophone, Robert Goodge on lead guitar, Barbara Hogarth on bass guitar and Cameron Newman on drums. It peaked at number 10 on the Kent Music Report singles chart. In May 1985 the song won Best Debut Single at the Countdown Awards of 1984.

== Background ==
"Trust Me" was recorded by Australian synth-pop band I'm Talking with the line-up of Zan Abeyratne on backing vocals, Kate Ceberano on lead vocals, Stephen Charlesworth on keyboards, Ian Cox on saxophone, Robert Goodge on lead guitar, Barbara Hogarth on bass guitar and Cameron Newman on drums. It was issued in November 1984 as a non-album single with Ross Cockle (Glenn Shorrock, Real Life) co-producing for Regular Records – their first recording for that label. It was co-written by band mates Ceberano, Charlesworth, Cox, Goodge, Hogarth and Newman. They also co-wrote its B-side "Take It to the Bridge".

== Recording ==
Goodge later recalled how they had scrapped earlier efforts to record "Trust Me" when working with label co-owner Cameron Allan, "we just didn't see eye to eye. We didn't even reach the mix stage." They found Cockle was "more egalitarian". Goodge acknowledges influences from "Street Dance" by Break Machine and "Let the Music Play" by Shannon, while their own track was "a mix of Freestyle and the lighter Beat Street production sound". For the 12" mix the group "set it out for the engineer in extended form and got them to add some delays etc. to the material."

Cockle later said, "It was a great combination with Kate and Zan. There was a freshness about them. Robert could play, Barbara was great- they looked and sounded fun. Robert knew exactly what he was after sound-wise and was quite single-minded about how it was to be executed. We recorded in a day and a half." Ceberano added, "I'm Talking's goal was to get funk and groove on the Australian charts."

== Reception ==
Paul Gardiner of The Canberra Times described "Trust Me" as, "a piece of pulsating smokey funk with soul vocals that, if a deal short of perfection, is nevertheless extremely good and certainly better than anything else in that bag produced in Australia."

== Track listing ==
7" single (RRSP 744)

- Side A "Trust Me" - 3:41
- Side B "Take It to the Bridge" - 3:40

12" single (RRT 615)

- Side A "Trust Me" (Extended) - 5:40
- Side B "Take It to the Bridge" - 3:40

== Charts ==
=== Weekly charts ===
Chart (1984/85)	Peak position
Australia (Kent Music Report)	10

=== Year-end charts ===
Chart (1985)	Position
Australia (Kent Music Report)	73
