= Machinations =

Australian band

- Origin: Sydney, New South Wales, Australia
- Genres: Synth-pop, pop
- Years active: 1980–1989, 1997, 2012–present
- Labels: Phantom, White, A&M, Epic, Mushroom, Almacantar
- Past members: See members list
- Website: myspace.com/machinations80s/bio

Machinations are an Australian synth-pop band which formed in 1980. They reached the top 20 on the Kent Music Report albums chart with Big Music in 1985. Their top 30 hits on the related singles chart are "Pressure Sway", "No Say in It", "My Heart's on Fire" and "Do to You". By 1989 the group had disbanded. They briefly reunited in 1997 and then reformed in 2012.

== History ==
=== 1980–1982: Debut EP ===
Machinations formed in 1980 in Sydney with the line up of Tim Doyle on guitar; Fred Loneragan on lead vocals; and Tony Starr on keyboards, vocals, and drum machine. Doyle and Starr had started song writing together at the end of 1979 using electronic instruments. Their school friend, Loneragan, joined, and in early 1980 Machinations played their first show at Garibaldi's in Darlinghurst. Another school friend, Nero (Nick) Swan, soon joined on bass guitar.

In late 1980, with the assistance of radio station Triple J, the band recorded tracks at Trafalgar Studios for the new music program. In November 1980 they entered a studio with Lobby Loyde as producer. The band's debut single, "Average Inadequacy", was released on 26 August 1981. Their debut self-titled, four-track extended play followed on 20 November; both appeared on the independent Phantom Records label. Machinations were managed by SCAM (Suss City Artist Management), which consisted of Sally Collins in partnership with Loyde. SCAM also managed The Triffids, Sardine v, The Sunnyboys, Tablewaiters and Local Product. "Average Inadequacy" created interest for Mushroom Records's imprint White Records Label to sign the band and reissue that single with a new B-side, "Machinations of Dance" in March 1982.

=== 1983–1984: Esteem and Big Music ===
In January 1983 the group released the single, "Jack". It was followed by "Pressure Sway" in April, which peaked at No. 21 on the Australian Kent Music Report singles chart. Shelley Dempsey of The Canberra Times described it as "probably [the band's] piece de resistance, (or most thrashed song, at least)". In the United States it reached No. 40 on the Billboard Club Play Singles chart.

In April 1983, Machinations released their debut album, Esteem, which peaked at No. 54 on the Kent Music Report albums chart. It was produced by Russell Dunlop. Woroni found that their live show is "tightly paced clever pop music" and that "it's gratifying to see that that punch has found its way on" the "very satisfying and worthwhile album". "Jumping the Gap" was released in October 1983. Dempsey declared that lead singer "Loneragan gives a high-powered performance which is probably rivalled only by Midnight Oil's Peter Garrett". Henry Downes provided percussion at live shows with the band and created the artwork for "Jumping the Gap".

Following the album's release, and an Australian tour supporting Joe Jackson, Machinations added Warren McLean on drums. Previously they had used a drum machine, Roland CR-78. The band recorded their second album, Big Music, at Rhinoceros Studios using Julian Mendelsohn as producer. Australian musicologist, Ian McFarlane, declared that the group "[emerged] with the smoothest and most fully realised album of [their] career". Big Music was released in June 1985 and peaked at No. 20.

Big Music provided three charting singles. The lead single, "No Say in It" was released in August 1984. The group found Mendelsohn "was really great to work with" on the single. They postponed working on the rest of the album until the producer was once again available. "No Say in It" is the band's highest charting single, it peaked at No. 14. The second single, "My Heart's On Fire" followed in May 1985 and reached No. 27. "You Got Me Going Again" was released in August and made No. 39. The album's fourth single, "Execution of Love", released in December failed to chart. Naomi Star provided backing vocals on most of the album, although Inez Lawson and Anne Redmond were featured on "No Say in It".

=== 1985–1989: The Big Beat, Uptown and disbandment ===
On 13 July 1985, Machinations performed three tracks, "Pressure Sway", "My Heart's On Fire" and "No Say in It", for the Oz for Africa concert (part of the global Live Aid program). It was broadcast in Australia (on both Seven Network and Nine Network) and on MTV in the US. The group developed a cult following in dance clubs during the mid-1980s. The Canberra Times' Andrew Ferrington felt they "have to be one of the best dance bands in the country at present. And Big Music is one of the best Australian dance albums about. It captures beat, depth and harmony that could well have eluded the Machis. The second side is by far the better. Led by 'No Say', the four other songs combine to give an exhausting record of the band at its best".

In May 1986, White Label released The Big Beat, a collection of dance remixes of previous singles which reached No. 83 on the albums chart. That year McLean left to join Melbourne funk-pop outfit, I'm Talking. He was replaced on drums, briefly by Downes and more permanently, by John MacKay (ex-Sea Monsters) in early 1987. The band were back in the studios soon after with US producer, Andy Wallace (Prince, Run DMC), recording a new album.

The band's third studio album, Uptown was released in October 1988 and reached No. 50 on the ARIA Charts. It provided four singles over eighteen months. The lead single, "Do to You" was released in August 1987 and reached No. 15. The second single, "Intimacy" reached No. 40, the third, "Do It to Me" peaked at No. 69 while the fourth, "Cars and Planes" failed to chart.

The group had become a popular band on the Australian touring circuit. Their activities were curtailed in April 1989 when a hit-and-run car accident left Loneragan with a broken neck, multiple cuts, bruises and concussion. He spent several months recuperating in hospital. Initially fellow band members intended to continue whilst Loneragan recovered, however the group disbanded as various members left to join other local groups. Swan toured with James Freud's band and with MacKay performed in Absent Friends.

=== 1990–present: Post-disbandment ===
In 1997 Machinations, with Loneragan, reconvened for live appearances, which they hoped would lead to new recordings; however no new material appeared.

In September 2006, US label Almacantar Records reissued the band's original 1981 EP with one additional track, "Average Inadequacy".

In February 2012, Machinations reformed and performed two shows at The Bridge Hotel in Rozelle and have continued infrequently since.

In 2020, Tony Starr was diagnosed with Motor Neurone Disease. He died on May 4, 2022.

== Members ==
- Tim Doyle – guitar (1980–present)
- Tony Starr – keyboards (1980–2022; died 2022)
- Fred Loneragan – vocals (1980–present)
- Nick (Nero) Swan – bass guitar (1981–2024)
- John Mackay – drums (1987–2016)

Former members

- Henri Downes – percussion (1982–83)
- Warren McLean – drums (1983–1986; died 2021)

Touring/session vocalists

- Naomi Starr, Toni Mott, Inez Lawson, Jenny Andrews, Ricardo.

== Discography ==
=== Studio albums ===
Title	Album details	Chart peak position			Certifications
Title	Album details	AUS	NZ	US CMJ Club	Certifications
Esteem	Released: April 1983; Label: White Label (L-37946); Format(s): Vinyl	54	—	22	ARIA: Gold
Big Music	Released: 24 June 1985; Label: White Label/Mushroom (L-38407); Format(s): Vinyl	20	36	—	
Uptown	Released: October 1988; Label: White/Mushroom (L-38925); Format(s): Vinyl, CD	50	—	—	

=== Extended plays ===
Title	Details
Machinations	Released: December 1981; Label: Phantom (PH-13); Format(s): Vinyl

=== Remix albums ===
Title	Album details	Chart peak position
Title	Album details	AUS
The Big Beat	Released: May 1986; Label: White Label (L-20051); Format(s): Vinyl, CD	83

=== Singles ===
List of singles as lead artist, with selected chart positions and certifications
Year	Title	Peak chart positions		Album
Year	Title	AUS	US Dance	Album
1981	"Average Inadequacy"	98	—	Non-album single
1983	"Jack"	—	—	Esteem
1983	"Pressure Sway"	21	40	Esteem
1983	"Jumping the Gap"	59	—	Non-album single
1984	"No Say in It"	14	—	Big Music
1985	"My Heart's on Fire"	27	—	Big Music
1985	"You Got Me Going Again"	39	—	Big Music
1985	"Execution of Love"	—	—	Big Music
1987	"Do to You"	15	—	Uptown
1988	"Intimacy"	40	—	Uptown
1988	"Do It to Me"	69	—	Uptown
1989	"Cars and Planes"	105	—	Uptown

== Awards and nominations ==
=== Countdown Australian Music Awards ===
Countdown was an Australian pop music TV series on national broadcaster ABC-TV from 1974 to 1987, it presented music awards from 1979–1987, initially in conjunction with magazine TV Week. The TV Week / Countdown Awards were a combination of popular-voted and peer-voted awards.

Year	Nominee / work	Award	Result
1984	"No Say in It"	Best Single	Nominated
