= Average Inadequacy =

- Original 7" sleeve

Single by Machinations
- B-side: "Arabia"; "Machinations of Dance"
- Released: August 1981
- Recorded: 1981
- Genre: New wave; synth-pop
- Length: 4:15
- Label: Phantom / White Label
- Songwriter(s): Fred Loneragan; Tony Starr; Nick Swan; Tim Doyle
- Producer(s): Lobby Loyde

Machinations singles chronology
"Average Inadequacy" (1981)	"Jack" (1983)

"Average Inadequacy" is a song written and recorded by the Australian synth-pop band Machinations. It was released in August 1981 as the band's debut single.

Mushroom Records's imprint White Label Records were interested and ultimately signed the band late in 1981, and the single was re-released in March 1982 under the White Label Records. The song peaked at number 98 on the Australian Kent Music Report in May 1982.

== Track listing ==
7" single (Phantom; PH-12)

- Side A "Average Inadequacy" – 4:15
- Side B "Arabia" – 4:44

7" single (White Label; K 8581)

- Side A "Average Inadequacy" – 4:04
- Side B "Machinations of Dance" – 3:37

== Charts ==
Chart (1982)	Peak position
Australia (Kent Music Report)	98
