= Point Blank (1976 album) =

Studio album by Point Blank
- Released: 1976
- Length: 32:21
- Label: Arista
- Producer: Bill Ham

Point Blank chronology
Point Blank (1976)	Second Season (1977)

Professional ratings
Review scores
Source	Rating
AllMusic	2/5 stars

Point Blank is the debut album by American Southern rock band Point Blank. Produced by Bill Ham, the album was released in 1976 by Arista Records.

== Track listing ==
1. "Free Man" – 5:08 (John O'Daniel, Rusty Burns)
2. "Moving" – 2:57 (O'Daniel, Kim Davis, Peter Gruen, Philip Petty, Burns)
3. "Wandering" – 5:19 (O'Daniel, Davis, Gruen, Petty, Burns)
4. "Bad Bees" – 2:31 (Petty, Burns)
5. "That's the Law" – 3:41 (O'Daniel, Davis, Gruen, Petty, Burns)
6. "Lone Star Fool" – 4:19 (O'Daniel, Davis)
7. "Distance" – 5:12 (O'Daniel, Davis, Gruen, Petty, Burns)
8. "In This World" – 3:09 (O'Daniel, Davis)

== Personnel ==
- Rusty Burns – guitar, slide guitar, vocals
- Kim Davis – guitar, vocals
- Peter Buzzy Gruen- drums, percussion
- John O'Daniel – vocals
- Phillip Petty – bass guitar
