= My Heart's on Fire =

- 7" sleeve

Single by Machinations

from the album Big Music
- B-side: "Spark"
- Released: May 1985
- Recorded: 1985
- Studio: Studios 301, Sydney
- Genre: Electronic; synth-pop
- Length: 4:15
- Label: White Label
- Songwriter(s): Fred Loneragan; Tony Starr; Nick Swan; Tim Doyle
- Producer(s): Julian Mendelsohn

Machinations singles chronology
"No Say in It" (1984)	"My Heart's on Fire" (1985)	"You Got Me Going Again" (1985)

"My Heart's on Fire" is a song recorded by the Australian synth-pop band Machinations. It was released in May 1985 as the second single from the band's second studio album, Big Music. The song peaked at number 27 on the Australian Kent Music Report.

== Track listing ==
7" single (K 9672)

- Side A "My Heart's on Fire" – 4:15
- Side B "Spark" – 5:05

12" single (X 13169)

- Side A "My Heart's on Fire" (extended) – 10:40
- Side B1 "My Heart's on Fire" (instrumental) – 7:11
- Side B2 "Spark" – 5:05

== Charts ==
Chart (1985)	Peak position
Australia (Kent Music Report)	27
