= Pressure Sway =

- 7" sleeve

Single by Machinations

from the album Esteem
- B-side: "Pushbike"
- Released: April 1983
- Recorded: 1983
- Studio: Albert Studios, Sydney
- Genre: New wave; synth-pop
- Length: 3:53
- Label: White Label
- Songwriter(s): Fred Loneragan; Tony Starr; Nick Swan; Tim Doyle
- Producer(s): Bruce Brown; Russell Dunlop

Machinations singles chronology
"Jack" (1983)	"Pressure Sway" (1983)	"Jumping the Gap" (1983)

"Pressure Sway" is a song recorded by the Australian synth-pop band Machinations. It was released in April 1983 as the second and final single from the band's debut studio album, Esteem and peaked at number 21 on the Australian Kent Music Report.

== Track listing ==
7" single (K 9074)

- Side A "Pressure Sway" – 3:53
- Side B "Pushbike" – 3:40

12" single (X 14030)

- Side A1 "Pressure Sway" (extended version) – 4:57
- Side B1 "Pressure Sway" (instrumental) – 6:16
- Side B2 "Pushbike" – 3:40

== Charts ==
Chart (1983)	Peak position
Australia (Kent Music Report)	21
