= No Say in It =

- 7" sleeve

Single by Machinations

from the album Big Music
- B-side: "Man Over Board"
- Released: August 1984
- Recorded: 1984
- Studio: Studios 301, Sydney
- Genre: New wave; synth-pop
- Length: 3:23
- Label: White Label
- Songwriters: Fred Loneragan; Tony Starr; Nick Swan; Tim Doyle
- Producer: Julian Mendelsohn

Machinations singles chronology
"Jumping the Gap" (1983)	"No Say in It" (1984)	"My Heart's On Fire" (1985)

"No Say in It" is a song recorded by the Australian synth-pop band Machinations. It was released in August 1984 as the lead single from the band's second studio album, Big Music. The song peaked at number 14 on the Australian Kent Music Report, becoming the band's first top 20 single. The song appeared in the film Ruthless People and was included on the soundtrack.

At the 1984 Countdown Music Awards, the song was nominated for Best Australian Single.

== Reception ==
Cash Box magazine said, "A power packed dance track from Australia's Machinations just right for progressive CHR and modern-leaning AOR."

== Track listing ==
7" single (K 9489)

No.	Title	Writer(s)	Length
1.	"No Say in It"	Fred Loneragan, Nick Swan, Tim Doyle, Tony Starr	3:23
2.	"Man Over Board"	Fred Loneragan, Nick Swan, Tim Doyle, Tony Starr	4:46

== Track listing ==
12" single (X 13169)

No.	Title	Writer(s)	Length
1.	"No Say in It" (Machinations Cut Mix)	Fred Loneragan, Nick Swan, Tim Doyle, Tony Starr	8:26
2.	"No Say in It" (Mendelsohn's Played Mix)	Fred Loneragan, Nick Swan, Tim Doyle, Tony Starr	7:11

== Charts ==
=== Weekly charts ===
Weekly chart performance for "No Say in It"
Chart (1984)	Peak position
Australia (Kent Music Report)	14

=== Year-end charts ===
Year-end chart performance for "No Say in It"
Chart (1984)	Position
Australia (Kent Music Report)	98
