= Lead the Way (song) =

- 7" single

Single by I'm Talking
- A-side: "Lead the Way"
- B-side: "Disko (Fall in Love Forever)"
- Released: 24 June 1985
- Recorded: May 1985
- Studio: AAV Studios, Melbourne
- Genre: Pop rock, Synth-pop
- Length: 3:47
- Label: Regular Records
- Songwriters: Kate Ceberano, Cameron Newman, Robert Goodge, Ian Cox, Barbara Hogarth, Stephen Charlesworth
- Producers: I'm Talking, Ross Cockle

I'm Talking singles chronology
"Trust Me" (1984)	"Lead the Way" (1985)	"Love Don't Live Here Anymore" (1985)

"Lead the Way" is a song written and recorded by the Australian band I'm Talking. It was released in June 1985 and peaked at number 25 on the Australian Kent Music Report.

According to the band's guitarist and composer, Robert Goodge production started "at Stalbridge Chambers, a dilapidated city building that seemed to house every groovy young artistic entrepreneur in town. Stephen Charlesworth and a gang of synthesiser wiz kids long had a studio there, and with Stephen operating the tape machines and synth sounds, it was a great place to try ideas." He goes onto state the song "gives a nod and a wink towards "Wanna Be Starting Something" but ends somewhere quite different. We had to have two attempts at recording it, starting at South Yarra’s Platinum but ending at Metropolis with the tried and true Ross Cockle at the desk."

On 13 July 1985, I'm Talking performed "Lead the Way" at the Oz for Africa concert (part of the global Live Aid program). It was broadcast in Australia (on both Seven Network and Nine Network) and on MTV in the US.

== Track listing ==
7" Single (K 9778)

- Side A "Lead the Way" - 3:47
- Side B "Disko (Fall in Love Forever)" - 4:33

12" Single (X 14189)

- Side A "Lead the Way" (Extended)
- Side B1 "Take It to the Bridge"
- Side B2 "Love Don't Live Here Anymore"

== Charts ==
Chart (1985)	Peak position
Australia (Kent Music Report)	25
