= Lin Buckfield =

Australian musician

- Born: Hong Kong
- Occupations: Television producer, reporter, journalist, musician

Linda Mary Buckfield is an Australian television producer, journalist and musician. Buckfield was the lead singer, songwriter and guitarist of the pop rock band Electric Pandas from 1983 to 1987. Buckfield's television work commenced in 1990, and she has since won five Walkley Awards.

== Biography ==
=== Music ===
Buckfield was the lead singer and guitarist for Electric Pandas through the mid-1980s. While a member of that band, she also released a duet with James Reyne in 1985 called "R.O.C.K.", which peaked at No. 44 on the charts. After the Electric Pandas disbanded, she formed another band called F.O.O.D. with Craig Karl Wacholz (guitar), Ray Spole (bass), Mike Spira (vocal rap) and Glen Patterson (drums). The group released a single called "Happy House" in 1990. Neil McKenzie (saxophone) and Dieter Pruggo (saxophone) were later added to the line-up, with the band's name being changed to Happy House. The newly named band then released a single, "What U Wanna Do That For?", two EPs called Shelter Down and Passion (1995), and an album, Happy House in 1993.

Buckfield has also played with MisChalin and is currently a member of Sydney band The Bully Girls.

=== Journalism ===
Buckfield started her television career in 1990 as a researcher, working on programs such as Street Stories and special projects. In 1994, Buckfield joined Channel 7 as a reporter for the satirical news program The Times. When the program folded, she worked on the Peter Manning-led Witness program, fronted by Jana Wendt. In 2000, she became a reporter/producer for Four Corners going on to win five Walkley Awards with the program, including a Gold Walkley in 2006. Since 2008, Buckfield has been the series producer for the ABC-TV series, Q&A.

== Discography ==
=== Singles ===
List of singles, with selected chart positions
Year	Title	Peak chart positions
Year	Title	AUS
1985	"R.O.C.K." (with James Reyne)	44

=== See also ===
- Electric Pandas

== Awards and nominations ==
=== Countdown Australian Music Awards ===
Countdown was an Australian pop music TV series on national broadcaster ABC-TV from 1974 to 1987, it presented music awards from 1979 to 1987, initially in conjunction with magazine TV Week. The TV Week / Countdown Awards were a combination of popular-voted and peer-voted awards.

Year	Nominee / work	Award	Result
1984	herself	Most Popular Female Performer	Nominated

=== Walkley Award ===
- 2000 Walkley Award (All Media) – Coverage of Indigenous Affairs, Go to Jail, Australian Broadcasting Corporation, (with Liz Jackson)
- 2000 Walkley Award (All Media) – Coverage of Sport, Fixing Cricket, Australian Broadcasting Corporation, (with Liz Jackson & Peter Cronau)
- 2005 Walkley Award (All Media) – International Journalism The Kilwa Incident, Australian Broadcasting Corporation (with Sally Neighbour and Jo Puccini)
- 2006 Walkley Award (Gold Walkley) – Stoking the Fires, Four Corners, Australian Broadcasting Corporation (with Liz Jackson and Peter Cronau)
- 2006 Walkley Award (All Media) – Coverage of the Asia-Pacific Region, Stoking the Fires, Four Corners, Australian Broadcasting Corporation (with Liz Jackson)
