= I Am =

I Am or I'm may refer to:

== Language and literature ==
- "I Am that I Am", a common English translation of the response God used in the Hebrew Bible when Moses asked for His name
  - I am (biblical term), a Christian term used in the Bible
- "I Am" (poem), 1848, by John Clare
- I Am: Eucharistic Meditations on the Gospel, a 1912 book by Cabrera de Armida112

== Film and television ==
- I Am, a 2005 Polish film directed by Dorota Kędzierzawska
- I Am (2009 film), a Russian film with Oksana Akinshina
- I Am (2010 American documentary film), a film by Tom Shadyac
- I Am (2010 American drama film), a Christian-themed film by John Ward
- I Am (2010 Indian film), an anthology film by Onir
- I Am, a 2011 Indian documentary film by Sonali Gulati
- I Am (2012 film), a documentary film about 32 SM Town K-pop artists
- I Am (film series), a series of celebrity documentary films
- I Am... (TV series), a 2019-2021 Channel 4 anthology television series
- "I Am." (Lovecraft Country), a 2020 television episode

== Music ==
=== Performers ===
- I Am (American band), an alternative rock band
- I Am (French band) or IAM, a hip hop band

=== Albums ===
- I Am... (Ayumi Hamasaki album) or the title song, 2002
- I Am (Becoming the Archetype album) or the title song, 2012
- I Am: Celine Dion (soundtrack) (2024)
- I Am (Chrisette Michele album), 2007
- I Am (Earth, Wind & Fire album), 1979
- I Am (Elisa Fiorillo album) or the title song, 1990
- I Am [ ], the 1995 debut album by Ké
- I Am (Leona Lewis album) or the title song (see below), 2015
- I Am (Mao Denda album), 2009
- I Am (Michael Tolcher album) or the title song, 2004
- I Am (Monrose album), 2008
- I Am... (Nas album), 1999
- I Am (Pain album), 2024
- I Am (Pete Townshend album), 1972
- I Am (Scout Niblett album) or the title song, 2003
- I Am (Yo Gotti album) or the title song, 2013
- I Am... Sasha Fierce, by Beyoncé, 2008
- I Am Mina, by Mina, 2011
- I Am..., by Futuristic, 2019
- I Am, by Texas in July, 2009

=== EPs ===
- I Am (EP), by (G)I-dle, 2018
- I'm (EP), by Sejeong, 2021
- I Am, by the Reverb Junkie (Michelle Chamuel), 2015
- I Am (Future Black President) The EP, by Novel, 2008
- I AM___, by Imogen Heap, 2025

=== Songs ===
- "I Am" (Awolnation song), 2015
- "I Am" (Crowder song), 2013
- "I Am" (Ive song), 2023
- "I Am" (Kid Rock song), 2004
- "I Am" (Killing Heidi song), 2004
- "I Am" (Leona Lewis song), 2015
- "I Am" (Mark Schultz song), 2006
- "I Am" (Mary J. Blige song), 2009
- "I Am" (Stan Walker song), 2023
- "I Am" (Train song), 2000
- "I Am" (Uncanny X-Men song), 1986
- "I Am", by Army of Lovers from The Gods of Earth and Heaven, 1993
- "I Am", by Axwell and Sick Individuals featuring Taylr Renee, 2013
- "I Am", by Bebe Rexha from Bebe, 2023
- "I Am", by Bobby Darin from Inside Out, 1967
- "I Am", by Bon Jovi from Have a Nice Day, 2005
- "I Am", by Christina Aguilera from Bionic, 2010
- "I Am", by Dio from Master of the Moon, 2004
- "I Am", by Dope from Group Therapy, 2003
- "I Am", by Drowning Pool from Sinner, 2001
- "I Am", by Godsmack from Faceless, 2003
- "I Am", by Hilary Duff from Hilary Duff, 2004
- "I Am", by Hitomi from Huma-rhythm, 2002
- "I Am", by Hollywood Undead from Notes from the Underground, 2013
- "I Am", by James Arthur from Back from the Edge, 2016
- "I Am", by JoJo from Mad Love, 2016
- "I Am", by Jorja Smith from the Black Panther film soundtrack, 2018
- "I Am", by Lil Baby and Gunna from Drip Harder, 2018
- "I Am", by Mýa from Liberation, 2007
- "I Am", by Radiator from Radiator, 1999
- "I Am", by Ricky Martin from Life, 2005
- "I Am", by Static-X from Wisconsin Death Trip, 1999
- "I Am", by Suggs from The Three Pyramids Club, 1998
- "I Am", by Yung Baby Tate from After the Rain, 2020
- "I Am (Interlude)", by Kendrick Lamar from Kendrick Lamar, 2009

=== Tours ===
- I Am Tour (Leona Lewis), 2016
- I Am... (Beyoncé tour), 2009

== Other uses ==
- "I AM" Activity, the original Ascended Master Teachings religious movement
- "i’m" initiative, of Windows Live Messenger
- "I Am", a 2008 slogan and marketing campaign by Orange United Kingdom
- "I AM", the slogan of the Invictus Games

== See also ==
- I Am What I Am (disambiguation)
- IAM (disambiguation)
- IM (disambiguation)
- "What I Am", a song by Edie Brickell
