= IAM =

IAM or Iam may refer to:

== Arts and media ==
- IAM (band), a French hip hop group from Marseille that formed in 1989
- I Am (American band), often styled I AM, an American rock band
- Intellectual Asset Management, an intellectual-property magazine
- IAM.BMEzine, a blogging website for members of BMEzine

== Organizations ==
- Maroc Telecom (Arabic transliteration: Ittisalat Al Maghrib), the main telecommunication company in Morocco
- Iglesia Anglicana de México; the Anglican Church of Mexico
- International Association of Machinists and Aerospace Workers, a North American labor union
- Institute of Advanced Motorists, former name of IAM RoadSmart, a UK charity for improving motorist standards
- Institute of Asset Management, a UK-based professional body for asset managers
- International Association of Memory, a governing body of international memory competitions
- International Assistance Mission, an NGO working in Afghanistan since 1966
- RAF Institute of Aviation Medicine, a British Royal Air Force aviation medicine research unit between 1945 and 1994
- International Academy of Macomb, a high school in Clinton Township, Macomb County, Michigan, US
- Institute of Administrative Management, a UK awarding organization and professional membership body for administrative and business managers
- Inversiones Aguas Metropolitanas, the controlling holding of Aguas Andinas
- Irish American Movement
- Islamic Association of Macau, an Islamic organization in Macau
- Municipal Affairs Bureau (Portuguese: Instituto para os Assuntos Municipais), a government department of Macau

== Science and technology ==
- Identity and access management, combining business processes, policies and technologies
- Integrated assessment modelling, a type of scientific modelling
- Integrated asset modelling, in the oil industry
- Internal auditory meatus, a canal in the temporal bone of the skull

== Other uses ==
- Iam, Caraș-Severin, a village in Berliște Commune, Caraş-Severin County, Romania
- IAM Cycling, a UCI WorldTour cycling team
- Master I. A. M. of Zwolle (c. 1440 – 1504), Dutch printmaker
- In Amenas Airport (IATA code: IAM), Algeria

== See also ==
- Iams, a brand of pet food
- I Am (disambiguation)
- 1 A.M. (disambiguation)
