= Don't Wake Me =

Single by Uncanny X-Men

from the album What You Give Is What You Get
- Released: September 1986
- Studio: Platinum Studios, Melbourne
- Genre: pop, pop rock
- Length: 3:24
- Label: CBS
- Songwriter(s): Brian Mannix
- Producer(s): Kevin Beamish

Uncanny X-Men singles chronology
"I Am" (1986)	"Don't Wake Me" (1986)	"Nothing Touches My World" (1987)

"Don't Wake Me" is a song by Australian pop-rock group Uncanny X-Men. The song was released in September 1986 as the second single from the band's second studio album, What You Give Is What You Get. The song peaked at number 31 on the Kent Music Report.

== Track listing ==
7" Vinyl (CBS - BA 3486)

1. "Don't Wake Me"
2. "Truckin' on into Alice"

== Charts ==
Chart (1986)	Position
Australian Kent Music Report	31
