= What You Give Is What You Get =

Studio album by Uncanny X-Men
- Released: October 1986
- Recorded: 1986
- Studio: Platinum Studios, (Melbourne)
- Genre: Pop rock, pop
- Label: CBS Records
- Producer: Kevin Beamish

Uncanny X-Men chronology
'Cos Life Hurts (1985)	What You Give Is What You Get (1986)

Singles from What You Give Is What You Get
- 1. "I Am" Released: April 1986; 2. "Don't Wake Me" Released: September 1986; 3. "Nothing Touches My World" Released: December 1986; 4. "Start Believing" Released: June 1987

'What You Give Is What You Get is the second and final studio album by Australian pop-rock group Uncanny X-Men. Uncanny X-Men signed to CBS Records in May 1986 and released What You Give Is What You Get in October 1986. The album was certified gold by the end of 1986.

== Track listing ==
Side A
No.	Title	Writer(s)	Length
1.	"Nothing Touches My World"	Brian Mannix, Ron Thiessen	4:52
2.	"Start Believing"	Chuck Hargreaves	3:40
3.	"I Am"	Mannix	3:29
4.	"About You"	Mannix, Hargreaves	4:30
5.	"Goodnight, So Long"	Mannix	3:48

Side B
No.	Title	Writer(s)	Length
1.	"I'm On Heat"	Mannix	3:54
2.	"Colour You Answer Blue"	Hargreaves, Brian Baker	4:49
3.	"Don't Wake Me"	Mannix	3:24
4.	"Playing the Titanic"	Mannix	2:53
5.	"What You Give"	Mannix	2:56

== Charts ==
Chart (1986)	Peak position
Australian (Kent Music Report)	19

== Certifications ==
Region	Certification	Certified units/sales
Australia (ARIA)	Gold	35,000^{^}
^{^} Shipments figures based on certification alone.

== Personnel ==
- John Kirk – bass
- Craig Waugh – drums
- Chris Corr – engineer
- Brett Kingman – guitar
- Joey Amenta – guitar
- Brian Mannix – vocals
