= 'SaliveOne! =

EP by Uncanny X-Men
- Released: November 1982
- Recorded: 2 November 1982
- Studio: AAV Studios, Melbourne
- Genre: Pop rock; pop
- Label: Mushroom
- Producer: Larry Tyler, Tony Buettel

Uncanny X-Men chronology
'SaliveOne! (1982)	Beach Party (1984)

'SaliveOne! is the debut extended play by Australian pop-rock group, Uncanny X-Men. It was released in November 1982 and peaked at No. 40 on the Kent Music Report Singles Chart. The EP was recorded live-in-the-studio in one day, two days after signing with Mushroom Records.

== Background ==
Uncanny X-Men had formed in Melbourne in 1981 and signed with Mushroom Records in 1982. They recorded a six-track extended play, 'SaliveOne!, live-in-the-studio at AAV Studios on 2 November 1982. Their line-up was Steve Harrison on bass guitar and vocals, Chuck Hargreaves on guitar and vocals, Brian Mannix on lead vocals and keyboards, Nick Matandos on drums and percussion, and Ron Thiessen on lead guitar and vocals. It was produced by Larry Tyler and Tony Buettel.

The name of the release is a pithy play upon the words "It's a live one!", as might be spoken in an Australian drawl.

== Track listing ==
Side A
No.	Title	Writer(s)	Length
1.	"Feel Right"	Brian Mannix, Ron Thiessen	3:39
2.	"Shame"	Mannix	3:51
3.	"I Wanna Be Your Baby"	J. Freud, S. Kelly	3:09

Side B
No.	Title	Writer(s)	Length
1.	"I'm the One"	Mannix, Steve Harrison	4:01
2.	"You Got Me"	Mannix, Thiessen, Harrison, Nick Matandos, Chuck Hargreaves	2:51
3.	"Pakistan"	Mannix, Thiessen	3:29

== Charts ==
Chart (1982)	Peak position
Australian Kent Music Report	40
