= 'Cos Life Hurts =

Studio album by Uncanny X-Men
- Released: June 1985
- Studio: Trafalgar Studios, Platinum Studios, Production Workshop
- Genre: Pop rock, synthpop, pop
- Label: Mushroom Records
- Producer: Red Sims; Chuck Hargreaves; Alan Mansfield

Uncanny X-Men chronology
Beach Party (1984)	'Cos Life Hurts (1985)	What You Give Is What You Get (1986)

Singles from 'Cos Life Hurts
- 1. "The Party" Released: February 1985; 2. "50 Years" Released: May 1985; 3. "Still Waiting" Released: August 1985

'Cos Life Hurts is the debut studio album by Australian pop-rock group Uncanny X-Men. 'Cos Life Hurts was released in June 1985 and sold over 100,000 copies in Australia. The album peaked at No. 3 in Australia and was certified 2× platinum.

== Track listing ==
Side A
No.	Title	Writer(s)	Length
1.	"Still Waiting"	Chuck Hargreaves	3:54
2.	"Work"	Brian Mannix	3:13
3.	"Boy (She Said)"	Mannix, Steve Harrison	3:10
4.	"Yoko"	Mannix	3:30
5.	"My Girl"	Hargreaves, Ron Thiessen	4:59

Side B
No.	Title	Writer(s)	Length
1.	"You Say That"	Hargreaves, Thiessen	3:41
2.	"Used to Know"	Mannix, Thiessen	3:33
3.	"The Party"	Mannix	3:05
4.	"50 Years"	Mannix, Thiessen	4:06
5.	"Best Looking Guy"	Mannix	2:47

== Charts ==
=== Weekly charts ===
Chart (1985)	Peak position
Australia (Kent Music Report)	3

=== Year-end charts ===
Chart (1985)	Peak position
Australia (Kent Music Report)	15

== Certifications ==
Region	Certification	Certified units/sales
Australia (ARIA)	2× Platinum	140,000^{^}
^{^} Shipments figures based on certification alone.
