= I Am What I Am =

I Am What I Am may refer to:

== Albums ==
- I Am What I Am (George Jones album)
- I Am What I Am (Mark Morrison EP)
- I Am What I Am (Merle Haggard album)
- I Am What I Am (Ruth Copeland album)
- I Am What I Am (Shirley Bassey album)
- I Am What I Am, a 1984 album by Jerry Lee Lewis
- I Am What I Am, a 1964 album by Milan the Leather Boy

== Songs ==
- "I Am What I Am" (King Von song) a song from Welcome to O'Block album of 2020
- "I Am What I Am" (Broadway musical song), a song from La Cage aux Folles
- "I Am What I Am" (Mark Owen song)
- "I Am What I Am" (Village People song)
- "I Am What I Am" (Emma Muscat song)
- "I Am What I Am", a song by Jonas Brothers from It's About Time
- "Am What I Am", a song by Kid Rock from Bad Reputation

== Films ==
- Col cuore in gola, a 1967 Italian film, released in the United States under the title I Am What I Am
- I Am What I Am (2021 film), a Chinese animated film by Sun Haipeng
- I Am What I Am (2022 film), a Japanese film by Shinya Tamada
- I Am What I Am 2, the 2024 Chinese animated sequel to the 2021 film

== See also ==
- "I Yam What I Yam", an early Popeye cartoon (1933), and an expression closely associated with the character
- I Am that I Am, taken from a Bible verse referring to God's name
- "I Am That I Am", a song by Peter Tosh from Equal Rights
- I Am Who I Am (disambiguation)
- Law of identity
