= I Am Tour =

I Am Tour may refer to:

- I Am Tour (Leona Lewis), was 2016 tour by British singer and songwriter Leona Lewis.
- I Am... World Tour (sometimes referred to as the I Am... Tour), was 2009 tour by American recording artist Beyoncé.

== See also ==
- I Am (disambiguation)
