= Uncanny X-Men (band) =

Australian rock band

- Origin: Melbourne, Victoria, Australia
- Genre: Pop rock
- Years active: 1980–1987; 1998; 2006; 2011; 2017
- Labels: Mushroom; Festival; CBS
- Members: Brian Mannix; Ron Thiessen; Chuck Hargreaves; John Kirk; Craig Waugh
- Past members: Steve Harrison; Nick Matandos; Joey Amenta; Brett Kingman

Uncanny X-Men were an Australian pop rock band which formed in late 1980. Their founding mainstay was lead singer Brian Mannix. Originally with Nick Matandos on drums and Ron Thiessen on guitar, they were soon joined by Chuck Hargreaves on guitar and Steve Harrison on bass guitar. John Kirk replaced Harrison and Craig Waugh replaced Matandos by 1984. The band's debut album, 'Cos Life Hurts (June 1985), peaked at No. 3 on the Australian Kent Music Report, and provided their highest-charting single "50 Years" which reached No. 4 on the related singles chart. Thiessen left to be eventually replaced by Brett Kingman. Their second album, What You Give is What You Get (October 1986), reached No. 19, and included a top 20 single, "I Am" (April). The group disbanded in 1987 and have occasionally reunited to play live concerts. Mannix has had a solo career as a singer, TV personality and actor.

== History ==
=== Beginnings: 1980–1982 ===
The Uncanny X-Men were named for the Marvel comic of the same name and were formed as a "hard edged guitar pop band" in Melbourne's western suburbs. They were originally a four-piece group, in late 1980, with Michael Helms on bass guitar, Brian Mannix on vocals and guitar, Nick Matandos on drums and Ron Thiessen on guitar. They were a regular Wednesday night attraction at the Pier Hotel in Frankston, Victoria.

In 1981 they became a five-piece when Helms left and was replaced by Steve Harrison on bass guitar and Chuck Hargreaves joined on guitar. Mannix became known for his mischievous and comical send-ups of other artists. The band were signed by Mushroom Records late in 1982 and released their six-track debut extended play, 'SaliveOne! in November, which peaked at No. 40 on the Kent Music Report. It had been recorded live-in-the-studio at Melbourne's AAV studios and radio stations featured its track, "Pakistan". They toured Australia in support of United States rock act Joan Jett & the Blackhearts.

=== Career peak: 1983–1987 ===
Early in 1983 Harrison was replaced on bass guitar by John Kirk and Uncanny X-Men released their single "How Do You Get Your Kicks" in March. It was written by Greg Macainsh of Skyhooks, who also co-produced the track with David Briggs. In late March 1983 they performed it on Australian TV pop music show, Countdown. Craig Waugh (ex-Primal Tears) replaced Matandos on drums and they released another single, "Time Goes So Fast", in August. They toured through 1984 and released another EP, Beach Party, in July, with its popular track, "Everybody Wants to Work".

"The Party" was released as a single in March 1985 and peaked at No. 17. In June 1985 the group released their debut studio album, 'Cos Life Hurts, which reached No. 2. Its second single, "50 Years", appeared at No. 6. Uncanny X-Men performed two songs for the 1985 Oz for Africa concert (part of the global Live Aid program) – "Everybody Wants to Work" and "50 Years" on 13 July. It was broadcast in Australia (on both Seven Network and Nine Network) and on MTV in the US. A third single "Still Waiting" from their debut album was released in August, the song becoming the unofficial anthem for Channel 9's popular Wide World of Sports program during the latter 1980s. Kirk, Mannix and Thiessen joined as guest musicians with The Incredible Penguins in 1985, for a cover of "Happy Xmas (War Is Over)", a charity project for research on little penguins, which peaked at No. 10 on the Australian Kent Music Report in December.

At the Countdown Australian Music Awards of 1985, which were held in April 1986, Uncanny X-Men were nominated for Most Popular Australian Group and Mannix for Most Popular Male Performer. Music journalist, Anthony O'Grady, described how the group's fans were "screeching dismay and derision every time their heroes were denied a prize. Finally, when INXS were announced Best Group and Michael Hutchence walked towards the stage, X-Men fans unfurled a 2 metre banner reading: '@*l! OFF POCK FACE'." Fans of both groups scuffled during the TV broadcast and as a result the Australian Recording Industry Association (ARIA) decided to hold their own awards ceremony in the following year.

Thiessen had left early in 1986 and briefly joined Kings of the Sun, he was temporarily replaced by Joey Amenta on guitar (ex-Taste, Redhouse, Russell Morris Band, Wendy and the Rockets) and more permanently by Brett Kingman (ex-Adventure). The band signed with CBS Records in May 1986 and released "I Am", which had reached No. 18 in May, ahead of their second album, What You Give Is What You Get, which peaked at No. 19 in November 1986. Further singles provided Uncanny X-Men with little chart success, and they disbanded in 1987.

=== Post-break up and reunions: 1987–present ===
Kingman, Mannix and Waugh joined with bass guitarist, Derek O'Leary, to form Dead Legends during 1989. Mannix then pursued a solo career including performing in pub rock bands and in stage plays. John Kirk moved into car sales in Brisbane, Chuck Hargreaves was a welder and fabricator in Perth, Craig Waugh drove trucks in Melbourne and Ron Thiessen built film and theatre sets in Sydney, although all still played in various bands.

In 1998 Uncanny X-Men reformed for a brief reunion with the line-up: Mannix, Thiessen, Hargreaves, Kirk and Waugh. In April 2006 the band reunited for a 'one-night only' concert at Crown Melbourne, the gig coinciding with their appearance on Channel 7's TV show, Where Are They Now?. In July 2009 founding member Steve Harrison died of cancer. They reunited again in March 2011, Mannix told Paul Cashmere of undercover.fm that the band hoped to record new music. On 23 November 2011 Uncanny X-Men closed out the final episode of popular ABC music quiz show, Spicks and Specks, playing a shortened version of "50 Years", which merged into "Everybody Wants to Work".

On 9 February 2014 Mannix appeared on Melbourne radio station Triple R's The Party Show and played the band's new song "Take It from Me", which they had debuted live at two Melbourne gigs in March 2011. In January 2017 the group played at the Rock in the Vines concert at Sutton Grange Winery, Victoria.

== Discography ==
=== Albums ===
Title	Album details	Chart peak position	Certifications
Title	Album details	AUS	Certifications
'Cos Life Hurts	Released: June 1985; Label: Mushroom Records (RML 53165); Formats: Vinyl Record	3	AUS:2× Platinum
What You Give is What You Get	Released: October 1986; Label: CBS Records (SBP 8204); Formats: Vinyl Record, Compact Disc	19	AUS:Gold

=== Extended plays ===
Title	Album details	Chart peak position
Title	Album details	AUS
'SaliveOne!	Released: November 1982; Label: Mushroom Records (L 20022); Formats: Vinyl Record	40
Beach Party	Released: August 1984; Label: Mushroom Records (X14068); Formats: Vinyl Record	32

=== Singles ===
Year	Title	Chart peak position	Album
Year	Title	AUS	Album
1983	"How Do You Get Your Kicks"	51	single-only release
1983	"Time Goes So Fast"	63	single-only release
1985	"The Party"	18	Cos Life Hurts
1985	"50 Years"	4	Cos Life Hurts
1985	"Still Waiting"	43	Cos Life Hurts
1986	"I Am"	18	What You Give is What You Get!
1986	"Don't Wake Me"	31	What You Give is What You Get!
1987	"Nothing Touches My World"	97	What You Give is What You Get!
1987	"Start Believing"	63	What You Give is What You Get!
2018	"Take It From Me"	–	non album single
2024	"It's a Shame"/"We Love It"	–	non album single

== Awards and nominations ==
=== Countdown Australian Music Awards ===
Countdown was an Australian pop music TV series on national broadcaster ABC-TV from 1974 to 1987, it presented music awards from 1979 to 1987, initially in conjunction with magazine TV Week. The TV Week / Countdown Awards were a combination of popular-voted and peer-voted awards.

Year	Nominee / work	Award	Result
1985	themselves	Most Popular Australian Group	Nominated

== Members ==
- Micheal Helms - bass guitar (1980–1981)
- Brian Mannix – lead vocals (1980–1987, 1998, 2006, 2011, 2017)
- Nick Matandos – drums (1980–1983)
- Ron Thiessen – guitar (1981–1986; 1987, 1998, 2006, 2011, 2017)
- Chuck Hargreaves – guitar (1981–1987, 1998, 2006, 2011, 2017)
- Steve Harrison – bass guitar (1981–1983; died 2009)
- John Kirk – bass guitar (1983–1987, 1998, 2006, 2011, 2017)
- Craig Waugh – drums (1983–1987, 1998, 2006, 2011, 2017)
- Joey Amenta - guitar (1986)
- Brett Kingman – guitar (1986-1987)
