= I Am Who I Am =

I Am Who I Am may refer to:

== Literature ==
- Modern English Bible versions' rendering of "I Am that I Am", is the name God gives Moses when he confronts the burning bush in Exodus 3:13–15
- I Am Who I Am, a 1978 play about Anna Anderson, written by Royce Ryton

== Music ==
=== Albums ===
- Sou quem Sou (I am who I am), a 1969 album by soccer player Armando Costa
- I Am Who I Am, a 2012 mixtape by Maino
- I Am Who I Am (album), a 2015 Country music record by former NHL hockey player Theo Fleury

=== Songs ===
- "I Am Who I Am" (Lara Fabian song), 2000
- "I Am Who I Am/Secret Love", a 2010 single by Lee Ryan
- "I Am Who I Am", a 2010 song from The Books album The Way Out
- "I Am Who I Am", a 2012 song from the Running Wild album Shadowmaker
- "I Am Who I Am", a 2013 song by Marta Ritova, a Latvian participant of the Eurovision Song Contest 2013

== See also ==
- I Am What I Am (disambiguation)
