= I Am (Uncanny X-Men song) =

- 12" Vinyl cover art

Single by Uncanny X-Men

from the album What You Give Is What You Get
- Released: April 1986
- Studio: Platinum Studios, Melbourne
- Genre: pop, pop rock
- Label: CBS
- Songwriter(s): Brian Mannix
- Producer(s): Kevin Beamish

Uncanny X-Men singles chronology
"Still Waiting" (1985)	"I Am" (1986)	"Don't Wake Me" (1985)

"I Am" is a song by Australian pop-rock group Uncanny X-Men. The song was released in April 1986 as the lead single from the band's second studio album, What You Give Is What You Get. The song as the first single released by the band on CBS Records. It peaked at number 18 on the Kent Music Report.

== Track listing ==
7" Vinyl (CBS - BA 3445)

1. "I Am"
2. "Treat Me Nice"
3. "Kill the Children"

12" Vinyl (CBS - BA12206)

1. "I Am" (Extended Version)
2. "Seaside"
3. "Treat Me Nice"
4. "Kill the Children"

== Charts ==
Chart (1986)	Position
Australian Kent Music Report	18
