= The Party (Uncanny X-Men song) =

Single by Uncanny X-Men

from the album 'Cos Life Hurts
- Released: February 1985
- Studio: Platinum Studios, Melbourne
- Genre: Pop, pop rock
- Length: 3:05
- Label: Mushroom Records
- Songwriter(s): Brian Mannix
- Producer(s): Red Pinko Sims

Uncanny X-Men singles chronology
"Time Goes So Fast" (1983)	"The Party" (1985)	"50 Years" (1985)

"The Party" is a song by Australian pop-rock group Uncanny X-Men. The song was released in February 1985 as the lead single from the band's debut studio album, 'Cos Life Hurts. It peaked at number 18 on the Kent Music Report, becoming the group's first top 20 single.

== Track listing ==
7" Vinyl/12" Vinyl (Mushroom – K-9579/X 13198)

1. "The Party"
2. "The Slug"

== Charts ==
Chart (1985)	Position
Australian Kent Music Report	18
