= 50 Years (song) =

Single by Uncanny X-Men

from the album 'Cos Life Hurts
- Released: May 1985
- Studio: Platinum Studios, Melbourne
- Genre: pop, Pop-rock, Soft rock
- Length: 4:06
- Label: Mushroom Records
- Songwriter(s): Brian Mannix; Ron Thiessen
- Producer(s): Red Pinko Sims

Uncanny X-Men singles chronology
"The Party" (1983)	"50 Years" (1985)	"Still Waiting" (1985)

"50 Years" is a song by Australian Rock-pop group Uncanny X-Men. The song was released in May 1985 as the second single from the band's debut studio album, 'Cos Life Hurts. It peaked at number 4 on the Kent Music Report, becoming the group's first top 5 single. The song was produced by Red Symons under the name Red Pinko Sims who added an extra chorus at the end.

Symons retrospectively said, "It does not have the naughty and vulgar charm of the other songs, tt is thoughtful and self-reflective" while Mannix said the song is "essentially about embracing the moment and living in the now."

== Background ==
When the label (Mushroom) heard "50 Years" they wanted it to be the lead single from the band's album. Mannix disagreed and met with Mushroom's Michael Gudinski to plead his case saying he wanted to release "Party" a song more representative of the band's sound at the time, then, release "50 Years" to "pull the rug out from under them."

Mannix said "I really liked a lot of those Rolling Stones ballads like "If You Really Want To Be My Friend" and "Wild Horses" so I was trying to write something like that. The lyrics pretty much wrote themselves. The line 'It don't mean nothin'' was just words I had when I was putting the chords together." Mannix continued saying some Vietnam War veterans have adopted the line as "Don't worry about it, what's done is done."

== Track listing ==
7" Vinyl (Mushroom – K-9671)

1. "50 Years"
2. "Best Looking Guy"

== Charts ==
=== Weekly charts ===
Chart (1985)	Peak position
Australia Kent Music Report	4

=== Year-end charts ===
Chart (1985)	Position
Australia (Kent Music Report)	27
