= Beach Party (EP) =

EP by Uncanny X-Men
- Released: August 1984
- Recorded: 1984
- Studio: AAV Studios, Melbourne
- Genre: Pop rock, pop
- Label: Mushroom Records
- Producer: Red Sims

Uncanny X-Men chronology
'SaliveOne! (1982)	Beach Party (1984)	'Cos Life Hurts (1985)

'Beach Party is an extended play by Australian pop-rock group Uncanny X-Men. 'Beach Party was released in August 1984 and peaked at No. 32 in Australia. The song "Everybody Wants to Work" was played on the radio to promote the EP.

== Track listing ==
Side A
No.	Title	Writer(s)	Length
1.	"Everybody Wants to Work"	Brian Mannix
2.	"Radio"	Mannix

Side B
No.	Title	Writer(s)	Length
1.	"Beach Party" (live at Chevron Hotel, Sydney (17 June 1984))	Mannix, Nick Matandos
2.	"Little Girls" (live at Chevron Hotel, Sydney (17 June 1984))	Mannix

== Charts ==
Chart (1984)	Peak position
Australian Kent Music Report Albums Chart	32
