= There's a Home =

Studio album by I Am
- Released: 1995
- Genre: Alternative rock, progressive rock
- Length: 48:46
- Label: U Call It Productions
- Producer: I Am

There's a Home is the 1995 debut of the Las Vegas alternative, progressive rock band I Am and contains thirteen tracks. The album was the only commercial release of I Am, which disbanded later that year. The album feature Greg Greer on vocals, Rod Arnett on bass, Dan Ryan on guitar, and video game music composer Frank Klepacki on drums. The album is influenced by Tool and Soundgarden, which are thanked in liner notes. The thirteenth song is not listed on the album; on this track, a somber man recites what are apparently self-help instructions and a humorous mantra—"the louder the apartment is, the happier I will be."

The song Destructible Times was used the same year in the video game Command & Conquer, specifically in the credits for the Brotherhood of Nod. Developers at Westwood Studios specifically requested the song because it "reflected the war aspect and bad-ass vibe of Nod's side." The band was once recorded live while performing this song. Greg Greer sued EA for copyright violation, but the case was dismissed. It was the first commercial album Klepacki's playing appeared on; he wrote several songs for the band. The album was recorded and engineered by Brett Hansen as Audio Art studios, and mastered by Brian Hamilton at Bernie Grundman Studios. Michael Lohr photographed the band. Though disbanded in 1995, Klepacki continues to support the band's music, offering There's a Home for sale on his website along with a t-shirt referencing Destructible Times.

== Track listing ==
I Am's "Destructible Times"
A 32 second sample of There's a Home track 11, "Destructible Times", which appeared in Command & Conquer

I Am's "Stand Alone"
A 30 second sample of There's a Home track 6, "Stand Alone", demonstrating the band's main musical style

1. Element
2. There's a Home
3. Finding Myself
4. Buzz
5. Progressive
6. Stand Alone
7. Costly
8. Bad Daze
9. Eyes
10. My Way
11. Destructible Times
12. Laughing It Off
13. I Will... (Bonus Track)

All tracks were written and performed by I Am.
