= Michael Tolcher =

American singer-songwriter

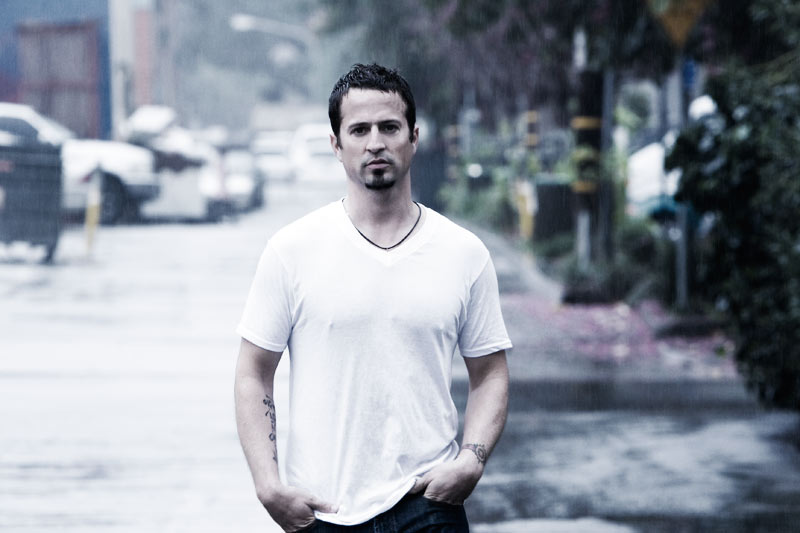

Background information
- Born: Front Royal, Virginia, U.S.
- Origin: Atlanta, Georgia
- Genres: Pop rock
- Occupation: Singer-songwriter
- Labels: A&M/Octone; Universal Music Group
- Website: michaeltolcher.com

Michael Tolcher is an American singer-songwriter who blends pop, blues, and urban grooves. He was born in Front Royal, Virginia, and has lived most of his life in and around Atlanta, Georgia.

== Biography ==
Growing up just south of Atlanta, Georgia, Tolcher, who got into music at a young age and wrote his first song at five, had his first public performance in his church choir around the same time. He was into sports his entire life, and ran track at UTC and Georgia Tech. He was injured in 1996 and began to then focus on music. He got his start at the Olympics in Atlanta as a street performer. Tolcher soon began touring in small venues around the country. Eventually arriving in New York City, he recorded his album I Am with producers Pop Rox in late 2003. It was released on Octone Records in 2004, and he toured as opening act for such artists as Maroon 5, Dave Matthews Band, Blues Traveler, Gavin Degraw, G Love & Special Sauce, The Funky Meters, Pat McGee Band, Everclear, The Clarks, Hanson, and Sister Hazel.

Tolcher's song "Sooner or Later" was the theme song for ABC's 2004–2005 series Life As We Know It. It also appears in the NBC sitcom Scrubs at the end of the episode titled "My Rite of Passage".

His song,"Bad Habits" featured in the episode "Near Wild Heaven" in the second season of One Tree Hill.

His song "Mission Responsible" was used as part of a public service announcement for the American Lung Association in 2004.

His song : "Speed Feels Better" was licensed out by Hilton Hotels and used for their 2008 Beijing Olympics Campaign.

His EP In the Meantime was released on March 10, 2009, and features "Speed Feels Better", "Wanting You Now", "Speed Feels Better Acoustic", and "Speed Feels Better" video. The "Speed Feels Better" video features cameos from various athletes: Amanda Beard, Andy Roddick, Barry Sanders, Kimmie Meissner, and Rick Ankiel.

Tolcher released his second full-length album, Eleven, on May 4, 2015.

In 2016 Michael had the good fortune of meeting REO Speedwagon at the Chicago White Sox game while singing the national anthem. He was invited on the spot to open some shows for them around the country.

Spring/ SUMMER 2018 : Tolcher is in the process of recording another album and will join Chicago (band) and Reo Speedwagon on tour in 36 cities around the USA.

== Discography ==
=== EPs ===
- Michael Tolcher EP (2003)
- See You Soon EP (2008)
- In the Meantime EP (2009)

=== Albums ===
- I Am (2004)
- Eleven (2015)
- Elemental (2018)

=== Singles ===
- "Mission Responsible" (2004)
- "Sooner or Later" (2005)
- "Speed Feels Better" (2009)

=== Compilations ===
- "Auld Lang Syne" on New Artist Holiday EP (2005)
