= How Do You Get Your Kicks =

Single by Uncanny X-Men
- Released: April 1983
- Studio: AAV Studios, Melbourne
- Genre: pop, pop rock
- Length: 3:36
- Label: Mushroom Records
- Songwriter(s): Greg Macainsh; David Briggs
- Producer(s): Greg Macainsh

Uncanny X-Men singles chronology
"How Do You Get Your Kicks" (1983)	"Time Goes So Fast" (1983)

"How Do You Get Your Kicks" is a song by Australian pop-rock group Uncanny X-Men. The song was released in April 1983 as the group's debut single. It peaked at number 51 on the Kent Music Report.

The music video included footage from their performance of the song on Countdown.

== Track listing ==
7" Vinyl (Mushroom – K-9034)

1. "How Do You Get Your Kicks" - 3:36
2. "Superhero" - 2:30

== Charts ==
Chart (1983)	Position
Australian Kent Music Report	51
