= Mao Denda =

Japanese singer-songwriter (born 1980)

Mao Denda 傳田 真央
- Also known as: Mao/d
- Born: Mao Denda; March 29, 1980 (age 46)
- Origin: Nagano, Nagano, Japan
- Genres: Pop; R&B
- Occupations: Singer; songwriter; record producer
- Instrument: Vocals
- Years active: 1999–2002, 2006–2018, 2020–present
- Labels: Mercury Entertainment; Kitty MME; Universal J; Playlist Zero
- Website: www.dendamao.com

Mao Denda (傳田 真央, Denda Mao; born March 29, 1980), also known as Mao/d (stylized MAO/d), is a Japanese singer-songwriter. In 2018 she announced that she was suspending her musical activities. She returned to the music industry in 2020 with the single "Plastic Eden".

== Discography ==
=== Singles ===
1. "Mimimoto ni Iru yo... (Ring the Bells)" (2000/1/19)
2. "Anata to Futari de (Be with Me All Day Long)" (2000/3/29)
3. "Masquerade" (2000/6/28)
4. "Happy Ever After/Soshite Me ga Sametara (3 Little Nights)" (2000/11/22)
5. "Dakiyoseta Destiny (Dream of Asia)" (2001/6/27)
6. "One Last Kiss (featuring Ai)" (2001/11/21)
7. "Very Love −0.5°C" (2006/11/22) as Mao/d
8. "Mizu no Inori: Joy" (2007/2/7) as Mao/d
9. "Bitter Sweet" (2009/3/18)
10. "Nakitaku Naru Kedo" (2009/7/1)
11. "My Style" (2009/11/25)

=== Studio albums ===
1. Eternal Voice (2000/12/20)
2. Diamond Kisses (2001/12/19)
3. I Am (2009/12/9)
4. Renai Chuudoku (2010/10/20)
5. Semi Double (2013/2/13)

=== EP albums ===
- Colors of Love (2007/12/5) as Mao/d
- Menz Collaboration (2012/9/5)

=== Remix albums ===
- Mao Denda Remixes (2001/3/28)

=== DVD ===
- Eternal Films History & Clips 1999–2001 (2001/10/24)
