= 1 A.M. =

- 1 A.M. is a time on the 12-hour clock. 1 A.M., 1am, One A.M. or variants, may also refer to:

== Film ==
- 01:00 A.M., 1995 Hong Kong horror film
- 1am (film), 2017 Tamil-language horror film
- One A.M. (1916 film), a Charlie Chaplin film
- One A.M. (unfinished film), by Jean-Luc Godard

== Music ==
- 1AM, a 2006 album by Taylor Deupree
- One A.M. (album), by Diverse, 2003
- "1AM" (song), by Taeyang, 2014
- "1AM", a song by The Subways from the 2005 album Young for Eternity
- "1AM", a song by YG from the 2014 album My Krazy Life
- "1AM", a song by Meek Mill from the 2018 album Legends of the Summer

== Other uses ==
- 1 attometre, a very small distance

== See also ==
- IAM (disambiguation)
- Lam (disambiguation)
