= I Am (Mao Denda album) =

Studio album by Mao Denda
- Released: December 9, 2009
- Recorded: 2008–2009
- Genre: Pop, R&B
- Length: 57:50
- Label: Universal J
- Producer: Mao Denda

Mao Denda chronology
Colors of Love (Mao Denda album) (2007)	I Am (2009)

Singles from I Am
- 1. "Bitter Sweet" Released: March 18, 2009; 2. "Nakitaku Naru Kedo" Released: July 1, 2009; 3. "My Style" Released: November 25, 2009

I Am is Mao Denda's third studio album and first in 8 years. It was released on December 9, 2009 and peaked at #25 on the weekly Oricon albums chart.

== Track listing ==
No.	Title	Lyrics	Music	Length
1.	"Always Love"	Mao Denda	Denda	31
2.	"Bitter Sweet"	Denda, Yuho Iwasato, Jeff Miyahara	Denda, Miyahara	4:55
3.	"Zutto (Always)"	Denda	Denda	5:14
4.	"Nakitaku Naru Kedo (泣きたくなるけど, But I'm About to Cry)"	Denda, Iwasato, Miyahara	Denda, Miyahara	4:25
5.	"Hare Tokidoki Ame (晴れ時々雨, Sunny, Sometimes Rainy)"	Denda, Miyahara	Denda, Miyahara	3:27
6.	"Let It Go"	Denda	Denda	4:50
7.	"Breathe In Love"	Denda, Iwasato	Denda	5:01
8.	"Be My Hero"	Denda	Fink Bro.	4:05
9.	"Oneway Exp."	Denda	Denda	6:04
10.	"Butterfly"	Denda, Mona	Ryosuke "Dr. R" Sakai	4:51
11.	"My Style"	Denda, Iwasato	Denda, Miyahara	3:54
12.	"Ritoru Meari (リトルメアリ, Little Mary)"	Denda	Denda	4:53
13.	"Someday"	Denda	Denda	2:13
14.	"Mimimoto ni Iru yo...:Ring the Bells Reprise (耳もとにいるよ…～Ring the bells REPRISE～, I'm Close to Your Ear...:Ring the Bells Reprise)" (Limited edition bonus track)	Denda	Denda	4:27

== Charts ==
=== Oricon Sales Charts ===
Release	Chart	Peak position	Debut sales	Sales total
December 9, 2009	Oricon Daily Albums Chart	20		9,826+
December 9, 2009	Oricon Weekly Albums Chart	25	5,412	9,826+
