= I Am (Michael Tolcher album) =

Studio album by Michael Tolcher
- Released: May 4, 2004
- Genre: Pop rock
- Length: 42:36
- Label: Octone
- Producer: Pop Rox

Michael Tolcher chronology
Michael Tolcher (2003)	I Am (2004)	See You Soon (2008)

Professional ratings
Review scores
Source	Rating
AllMusic	3/5 stars

I Am is Michael Tolcher's debut album, produced by Pop Rox. It was released on Octone Records on 4 May 2004.

Four of the songs had previously appeared on Tolcher's self-titled EP, released in 2003.

"Sooner Or Later" was used as the theme song for ABC's 2004-2005 series Life As We Know It.

== Track listing ==
1. "Mission Responsible" – 3:49
2. "Sooner or Later" – 3:49
3. "No One Above" – 3:16
4. "The Sun Song" – 4:04
5. "Bad Habits" – 4:19
6. "This Is What I Mean By That" – 3:13
7. "I Am" – 3:50
8. "Taxi Ride Kinda Night" – 2:25
9. "Kiss and Tell" – 3:02
10. "Miracle" – 3:17
11. "Kings In Castles" – 3:36
12. "Waiting" – 3:56

== Credits ==
- Michael Tolcher – vocals, guitar
- Warren Haynes – guitar, vocals
- Eddie Martinez – guitar
- Gary Phillips – guitar
- Robbie Kondor – piano
- Gavin DeGraw – piano, vocals
- Peter Levin – keyboards
- Paul Frazier – bass
- Carl Carter – bass
- Mo Roberts – drums
- Steven Wolf – drums
- Steve Williams – drums
- Duke Mushroom – percussion
- Questlove – additional percussion
- Chris Shaw – recording engineer
