= I Am What I Am 2 =

- Theatrical release poster
- Traditional Chinese: 雄獅少年2
- Simplified Chinese: 雄狮少年2
- Hanyu Pinyin: Xióngshī Shàonián 2
- Directed by: Sun Haipeng
- Written by: Sun Haipeng; Shen Cheng; Zhang Ting; Shi Mai
- Produced by: Zhang Miao; Cheng Haiming; Zheng Cheng
- Cinematography: Wang Lu
- Edited by: Ye Xiang
- Music by: Luan Hui
- Production companies: Beijing Splendid Culture & Entertainment; Yi Animation
- Distributed by: Beijing Splendid Culture & Entertainment
- Release date: December 14, 2024 (China)
- Running time: 133 minutes
- Country: China
- Language: Mandarin
- Box office: US$11.32 million

I Am What I Am 2 (Chinese: 雄狮少年2; lit. 'Lion Boy 2'), also known as The Kung Fu Kid internationally, is a 2024 Chinese animated martial arts comedy-drama film directed by Sun Haipeng. It is the sequel to I Am What I Am (2021).

Following the events of the previous film, Gyun leaves his hometown in Guangdong in search of work to pay for his sick father's healthcare. While the first focused on lion dancing in a traditional rural setting, the sequel depicts martial arts culture in the modern city of Shanghai.

The film was released in China on December 14, 2024. It received positive reviews, but was a box-office bomb, earning less than half of its production budget.

== Plot ==
Gyun's father is injured in a construction accident and falls into a coma. He eventually wakes at the end of the first film, following the victory of Gyun's team at the lion dance competition in Guangzhou. Now in Shanghai, Gyun works in a construction company to gather funds for his father's medical expenses.

Gyun's friends Mao and Gou come to him with an opportunity to perform an lion dance opening act for an exhibition by Quizhen Martial Art School, where they held mock sparring matches with various martial artists. However the Muy Thai fighter was stuck in traffic, so the gym had no choice but to dress up Gyun for the role. Gyun was promptly defeated by Master Zhang. The exhibition was interrupted by Xiao Zhangyang, the star fighter of Jinxin Fighting Club, who challenges and defeats Zhang with little effort. Due to the public humiliation, the school's investor pulls out. Zhang's adopted daughter, Xiaoyu, apologizes to the three boys for not being able to pay them, and gives her contact info to reach out to her once she gets the money.

Gyun is later fired from his job at the construction company after being blamed for theft, then evicted from his apartment for housing Mao and Guo in his one-person apartment. With no options left, Gyun goes to the Quizhen School, a seemingly small generic building overshadowed by the Jinxin Club next door, to get the money he was owed. He finds that Xiaoyu is being harassed by the students of Jinxin demanding compensation for a fake injury in her building. Gyun defends Xiaoyu from the bullies and shows off his raw talent for martial arts. Xiaoyu suggests that Gyun should participate in Shanghai Fight Night, a fighting tournament hosting various martial artists from around the world, on behalf of Quizhen for the chance to win prize money. Despite Zhang's initial refusal, the school has no choice after they receive a notice of foreclosure and Zhangyang threatening to buy the building. The three boys help Zhang and Xiaoyu pack up their school and later move into their apartment. Because of the lack of space, Zhang trains Gyun at his old martial art school, now an abandoned building overgrown with weeds. While they help Gyun train, they run a food stand to make ends meet.

Some time later, Gyun participates in his first match against Silva, a Brazilian fighter who specializes in taekwondo and capoeira. While Silva initially toys with him, Gyun manages to hold his own thanks to his training and his strong stances from lion dancing. Gyun manages to land a devastating blow to Silva's ankle, severely crippling his ability to kick. After landing a second hit to the same ankle, Silva was too injured to continue and Gyun won the match by knockout.

Zhang tells the boys how Quizhen fell and Jinxin rose to fame. Jinxin promoted themselves on being modernized martial arts and spread slander on traditional kung fu being a scam. In an effort to protect their reputation, many kung fu master fought Zhangyang, Zhang included. All of them were defeated by Zhangyang mysteriously strong punches and Zhang suffered a permanent injury to his vision because of it. Because of the school's faltering finances, Xiaoyu came back from studying abroad to help the school's finances.

Zhang puts all his focus on training Gyun while Mao and Guo run the food stand. Xiaoyu asks around hoping to find an investor. Gyun continues to win matches and move up in the ranks. Zhang tries to employ the help from former masters: masseuse Master Li who specializes in vital point striking art, butcher Master Elbow of Rolling Dragon Elbow, and magician Master Ming of Ying-Yang Hands. All three refuse to help. Xiaoyu finally manages to secure an anonymous investor on the condition that he also meets Gyun. However the investor turns out to be Jin Muyang, the investor of Jinxin Fighting Club and one of the sponsors of the tournament. Jin offers to pay off Quizhen School's debts, additional costs of renovation, and give Xiaoyu full control on how she wants to run it, on the one condition that the school be renamed as a branch of Jinxin. Xiaoyu rejects the offer and storms off, then goes to a theme park with Gyun. She helps Gyun find confidence in himself and they make a wish at the top of a ferris wheel.

Gyun continues to rise up in the ranks, and makes it to the semi-finals. He faces Yasang, a muy thai fighter from Thailand. While Gyun struggles to fight Yasang, Zhang notices that the timekeeper was bribed. When confronting the timekeeper, he receives a yellow then red card and removed from the ring. Despite taking many blows and hardly landing one, Gyun manages to land one strong kick to Yasang's jaw, winning the match by knockout.

While celebrating their victory into the finals, the Quizhen school is kicked off the abandoned property by construction workers after Jin buys the property for renovation. Then orchestrated by Jin, Gyun faces public slander when video footage of him fighting off the bullies that were harassing Xiaoyu was framed as him being the aggressor. Their reputation is ruined further as people found out about the school's financial ruin, Gyun posing as a muy thai fighter in the school exhibition, Gyun being fired from a construction company for theft, then false rumors of Gyun and his friends having a warrant for their arrest. The online backlash escalates to people finding Xiaoyu's address and phone number.

Gyun is later removed from the tournament and Zhangyang is pronounced the winner by default. Jinxin Fighting Club receives national publicity and expands, now employing the other contestants of the tournament such as Yasang and Silva. Gyun and his friends struggle to find work as everyone thinks they are criminals. With the school now in ruins, Xiaoyu offers her savings to Gyun to pay for his father's medical bills as she go back to the US to finish college. Gyun's lion dancing master and his mother hear about what is happening in Shanghai and urge him to come home. While the boys preparing to go back home, they are stopped by a journalist investigating the tournament. The journalist shows images from the tournament, Zhangyang's handwraps always have cracks in them after each match, which shouldn't be physically possible. They theorized that Zhangyang must have been cheating by using plaster powder in his wraps which would eventually harden from soaking in his sweat. Zhang now realizes this was how all the kung fu masters lost to his surprisingly strong punches.

As the Jinxin Fighting Club prepares to hold an outdoor public exhibition match to advertise their school, Gyun and his friends intervene and goad Zhangyang to a fight. He agrees despite Jin urging him to walk away. In the fight, Gyun uses the techniques taught to him by the three masters, who have now agreed to train him after learning how Zhangyang cheated. While Zhangyang initially held the advantage, Gyun was actually stalling to allow his plaster to harden. After Gyun struck against his punch with an elbow strike, Zhangyang's glove shattered, revealing to everyone how he cheated. As the audience, the other fighters, and Jin Muyang rejected him, Zhangyang still continued to find Gyun without rules. However without a referee, gloves, or solid footing since the rain made the ring wet, Zhangyang's style of fixed-environment kickboxing was unable to keep up with the Gyun's unrestricted varieties of kung fu styles, and admits defeat.

Impressed by Gyun's effort to uncover the truth and facing Zhangyang, one of Jinxin's original investors reaches out to the Quizhen School. They buy back their old building and Gyun manages to pay for his father's recovery.

== Voice cast ==
- Li Xin as Liu Jiajuan, also known as Gyun
- Chen Yexiong as Mao (lit. 'cat')
- Guo Hao as Gou (lit. 'dog')
- Cai Xinran as Wang Xiaoyu (lit. 'little rain')
- Wang Yilang as Zhang Wate, who studied kung-fu under Xiaoyu's father
- Zhang Jie as Jin Muyang

== Production ==
=== Development ===
Director Sun Haipeng had not initially planned on creating a sequel to I Am What I Am, but following positive reception after its release, he began development on the second film in March 2022.

Although Shanghai was initially chosen merely to take Gyun out of familiar territory, Sun later realized that it had a "strong martial tradition, despite its modern veneer [...] demonstrated by its association with figures like kung fu master Huo Yuanjia". The Guangdong-based creative team visited Shanghai seven times through all four seasons, photographing textures and details to accurately recreate its atmosphere.

The team took visual cues from landmarks such as the City God Temple, the Oriental Pearl Tower, Waibaidu Bridge, and Nanjing Road. Places the characters live in were based on traditional Shanghainese shikumen architecture from the late 1800s and early 1900s, and "Workers' New Villages" (Chinese: 工人新村), public housing built by the Shanghai municipal government from the 1950s onwards. Sun's visit to a soon-to-be-demolished building inspired the cramped 5-square-metre (54 sq ft) apartment shared by Gyun and his friends.

According to Sun, the script development process was challenging, undergoing three major revisions over a six-month period. A key difficulty lay in illustrating the relationship between the characters Gyun and Xiaoyu, and depicting their motivations for their involvement in martial arts.

=== Visual effects ===
Production started by the end of 2022, with the crew being allowed greater creative freedom compared to the first film.

Martial arts masters, including Zhang Peng, a shaolin specialist and national bajiquan champion, were hired as action choreographers, blocking scenes and providing motion capture for characters. The director additionally trained under Zhang for several months during production. Screenwriter Shen Cheng provided advice on the film's portrayal of wushu, having been a practitioner for twenty years, competed in tournaments, and written several wuxia novels.

=== Post-production ===
The film's sound design, dialogue recording, and mixing was done in Beijing under the supervision of POW Studios, a New Zealand-based post-production facility.

== Music ==
The soundtrack was composed by Luan Hui, then edited and mixed in Dolby Atmos by POW Studios in Wellington, New Zealand. It integrates the traditional tanggu, a type of drum used in lion dance, with elements of Chinese hip-hop and rock music. The soundtrack album was recorded at AIR Studios in London and released by Sony Music on January 15, 2025, containing 21 orchestral tracks and 6 songs by guest artists.

The theme song, "Nameless Man" (Chinese: 无名的人), was again sung by Angela Zhang, reprising her role from the first film. Twenty-one year old rapper Cas14 composed the ending theme, titled "Youth Power" (Chinese: 少年强), with lyrics inspired by Classical Chinese poetry.

== Release ==
=== Theatrical ===
The first footage of I Am What I Am 2 was shown at the 25th Shanghai International Film Festival on June 11, 2023. Production company Beijing Splendid Culture & Entertainment announced it would be part of "China's Teen Universe", a new series of films about China's youth, and set a release date for 2024.

The film was shown at advance screenings across 18 cities on December 7, 2024. It received a wide release in China in regular, Dolby Cinema, and IMAX formats a week later on December 14, 2024.

=== Streaming ===
The film was released on Chinese streaming platforms, including Tencent Video and Youku, on June 1, 2025, coinciding with the Dragon Boat Festival.

== Reception ==
I Am What I Am 2 earned CN¥57.54 million in its opening week and CN¥74.04 million in its first month. It ultimately made CN¥81.22 million (US$11.32 million), less than a third of the first film's CN¥250 million gross. As production and marketing costs were estimated to be CN¥200 million and CN¥80 million respectively, higher than the first's, the film's release resulted in a loss of roughly CN¥200 million (US$27 million).

In January 2025, the film was named one of the top ten Chinese films of the past year at the 31st Shanghai Film Critics Awards.

== Sequel ==
There were plans for a third film, focusing on dragon boat racing, to finish the trilogy, but its future was uncertain after I Am What I Am 2 did poorly at the box office. Producer Cheng Haiming later stated in an interview in January 2025 that the film was still under consideration, depending on the amount of government funding and backing from investors; it was reported to be in the planning stages in June 2025.
