= Integrated asset modelling =

Type of computer modelling

Integrated asset modelling (IAM) is the generic term used in the oil industry for computer modelling of both the subsurface and the surface elements of a field development. Historically the reservoir has always been modelled separately from the surface network and the facilities. In order to capture the interaction between those two or more standalone models, several time-consuming iterations were required. For example, a change in the water breakthrough leads to a change in the deliverability of the surface network which in turn leads to a production acceleration or deceleration in the reservoir. In order to go through this lengthy process more quickly, the industry has slowly been adopting a more integrated approach which captures the constraints imposed by the infrastructure on the network immediately.

== Basis ==
As the aim of an IAM is to provide a production forecast which honours both the physical realities of the reservoir and the infrastructure it needs to contain the following elements;

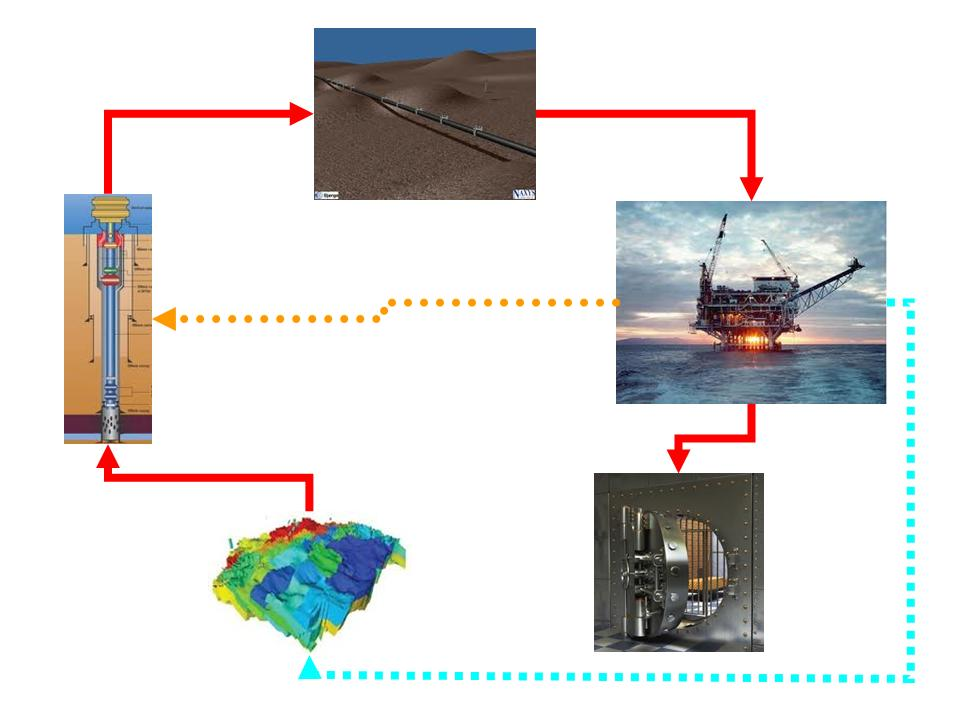
Typical Components of an IAM

- A pressure network
- A subsurface saturation model
- An availability model
- A constraint manager
- A production optimisation algorithm

Some but not all models also contain an economics and risk model component so that the IAM can be used for economic evaluation.

== IAM vs. IPM ==
The term Integrated Asset Modeling was first used by British Petroleum (BP), and this term is still maintained till date. Integrated asset modeling links individual simulators across technical disciplines, assets, computing environments, and locations. This collaborative methodology represents a shift in oil and gas field management, moving it toward a holistic management approach and away from disconnected teams working in isolation. The open framework of SLB’s Integrated Asset Modeling (IAM) software enables the coupling of a wide number of simulation software applications including reservoir simulation models (Eclipse, Intersect, MBX, IMEX, MBAL), multiphase flow simulation models (Pipesim, Olga, GAP), process and facilities simulation models (Symmetry, HYSYS, Petro-sim, UniSim) and economic domain models (Merak Peep).

Historically the terms Integrated Production Modeling and Integrated Asset Modeling have been used interchangeably. The modern use of Integrated Production Modeling was coined when Petroleum Experts Ltd. joined their MBAL modeling software with their GAP and Prosper modeling software to form an Integrated Production Model.

== Benefits of Integrated Asset Modelling ==
Having an IAM built of an asset or future project offers several advantages;

- Faster runtimes which allow scenario analysis and Monte Carlo analysis
- Insight in the interactions between various components of a development
- An answer in economic rather than recovery terms (not always available)

== Difficulties of Integrated Asset Modelling ==
By its very nature an IAM requires a multi disciplinary approach. Most companies are too compartmentalised for this to be easy, as a result of this an integrated approach has the following drawbacks;

- More difficult to spot errors
- Requires constant communication between various departments, ownership is either vague or too much part of one silo.

The biggest barrier to adoption of IAM is frequently the resistance of reservoir engineers to any simplification of the subsurface. This argument is sometimes valid, sometimes not, see below.

== Appropriate use of IAM ==
As with any other software because of the inherent limitations in any virtual model use of an IAM is only appropriate during various stages of a project life. There are no hard and fast rules for this as there are a variety of software packages on the market which offer very accurate modelling of a very small scope to very rough modelling of a very large scope and anything in between. Currently the definition of IAM contains anything from daily optimisation to portfolio management. The success or failure of an IAM implementation project therefore depends on selecting the tool which is as complex as it needs to be but no more. The following contains some examples of areas where an IAM is the appropriate decision support tool

- Concept Select
- Debottlenecking and optimisation of very large or complex infrastructures
- Life of field analysis of production optimisation scenarios

Note that for most of these areas the accuracy of the reservoir proxy is not important, the decision is made based on relative performance differences, not absolute values.

== Approach ==
Several different software packages are commercially available and there is a clear difference in philosophy between some of them.

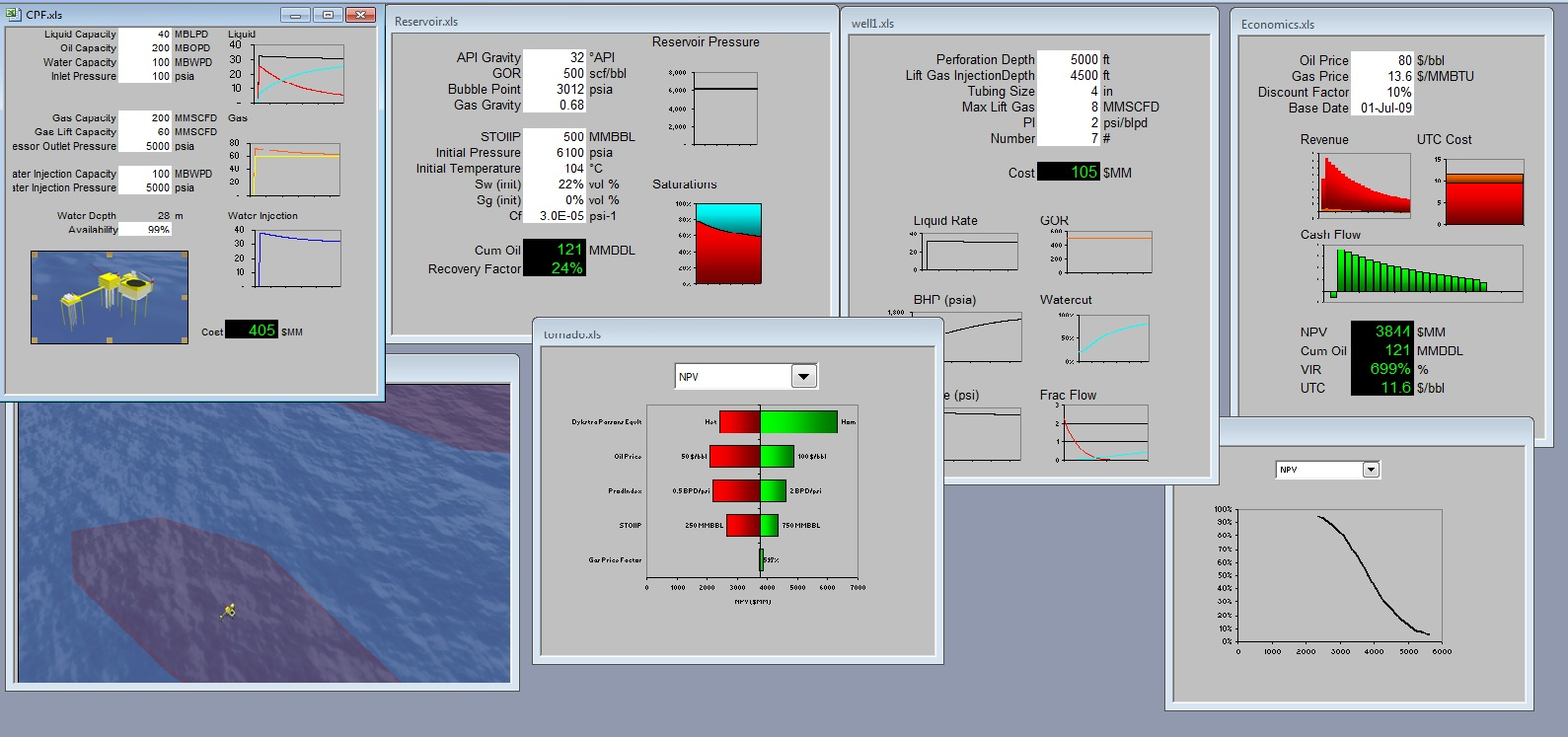
RAVE GUI screenshot

=== Linked Existing Software ===
Some vendors who have previously marketed standalone software for the subsurface and the surface are now marketing additional software which provides a datalink between the various packages. The obvious benefit of this approach is that there is no loss in accuracy and it does not require a remodelling exercise. However this approach also has its drawbacks, there is no time gain and the integration component of the entire package requires expertise which is not readily available, external specialist are frequently called upon to build and maintain the links between the components.

=== Bespoke Software ===
There are relatively few software packages on the market which are truly integrated, however these can offer the benefit of shorter runtimes and lower expertise thresholds.

=== Software as a service ===
A number of the established service companies now offer integrated asset modelling as a service. In practice this means that existing models will be either converted or linked by specialists to form an integrated solution. This solution is expensive but frequently the preferred option if the highest accuracy is required.

== Comparison of IAM tools ==
Name	Vendor	Philosophy	Complexity Application
Petrel	SLB	Full end-to-end integrated platform	Low - High
Intersect	SLB	High-resolution, high-fidelity tool for full integration of pore to process workflows	Low - High
Eclipse	SLB	Multi-reservoir to surface integrated asset modeling	Low - High
tNavigator	Rock Flow Dynamics	Fully integrated surface and subsurface integrated asset model	Low - High
CoFlow	CMG Ltd	A multi-fidelity, multi-disciplinary, IPSM tool	Low - High
Nexus	Halliburton	Multi-reservoir and surface integrated asset model	Low - High
enersight	3esi-Enersight	Integrated Asset Development	Low - Moderate
Pipe-It	Petrostreamz	Integrate and optimize models	Low - High
Avocet-IAM	SLB	Linked existing packages	Low - High
Pipesim	SLB	Linked existing packages	Low - High
GasAssure	Stochastic Simulation	Fully Integrated, Reservoir to Market Solution	Low - High
IPM	Petroleum Experts (PETEX)	Multi-Vendor packages linked	Low - High
ReO	Weatherford	IPM with option to do life of field	Low - Moderate
RAVE	Ingen	Bespoke	Low - Moderate/High
PetroVR	Caesar Systems	Accelerate Confidently	Low - High
FUTURES®	Serafim Ltd	Simplification of large, complex networks	Low - High
Maximus	KBC Advanced Technologies	Fully integrated surface and subsurface IPM tool	Low - High
Precept	Cleverfield	The simplest yet powerful IAM software	Low - High
Previso	Quorum Software	Model complex production systems in minutes	Low - High

== See also ==
- reservoir simulation
- petroleum engineering
