= Still Waiting (Uncanny X-Men song) =

Single by Uncanny X-Men

from the album 'Cos Life Hurts
- Released: August 1985
- Studio: Platinum Studios, Melbourne
- Genre: pop, pop rock
- Length: 3:49
- Label: Mushroom Records
- Songwriter(s): Chuck Hargreaves
- Producer(s): Alan Mansfield

Uncanny X-Men singles chronology
"50 Years" (1985)	"Still Waiting" (1985)	"I Am" (1986)

"Still Waiting" is a song by Australian pop-rock group Uncanny X-Men. The song was released in August 1985 as the third and final single from the band's debut studio album, 'Cos Life Hurts. It peaked at number 43 on the Kent Music Report, becoming the group's third consecutive top 50 single.

"Still Waiting" became an unofficial anthem for Channel 9's popular Wide World of Sports program throughout the remainder of the 1980s.

== Track listing ==
7" Vinyl (Mushroom – K-9805)

1. "Still Waiting" - 3:49
2. "Time Goes So Fast" (Recorded live at the Sydney Entertainment Centre on 7 July 1985) - 3:28

== Charts ==
Chart (1985)	Position
Australian Kent Music Report	43
