= I Am What I Am (2021 film) =

- Film poster
- Traditional Chinese: 雄獅少年
- Simplified Chinese: 雄狮少年
- Literal meaning: Male lion boy
- Hanyu Pinyin: Xióngshī Shàonián
- Jyutping: Hung^{4}si^{1} Siu^{3}nin^{4}
- Directed by: Sun Haipeng
- Written by: Li Zelin
- Produced by: Zhang Miao; Cheng Haiming
- Edited by: Ye Xiang
- Music by: Luan Hui
- Production company: Yi Animation
- Release dates: December 11, 2021 (premium large format); December 17, 2021 (wide release)
- Running time: 104 minutes
- Country: China
- Languages: Standard Chinese (Mandarin); Yue Chinese (Cantonese)
- Box office: US$39.4 million

I Am What I Am (simplified Chinese: 雄狮少年; traditional Chinese: 雄獅少年; pinyin: Xióngshī Shàonián; Jyutping: Hung^{4}si^{1} Siu^{3}nin^{4}; lit. 'Male lion boy') is a 2021 Chinese animated comedy-drama film directed by Sun Haipeng and distributed by Beijing Splendid Culture & Entertainment Co., Ltd. The film tells the story of Gyun, a left-behind teenager in a remote village, who forms a lion dancing team with his best friends, Mao and Gou, and eventually wins a lion dancing competition.

The film was released in China on December 17, 2021, with a positive word-of-mouth, but suffered from controversy among Chinese netizens due to the style of the character designs, which affected the box office. A sequel, I Am What I Am 2, was released in 2024.

== Plot ==
Gyun is a timid 18-year-old boy who lives with his grandfather in a village while his parents work on construction in Guangzhou. While watching a lion dance at a Lunar New Year festival, he was bullied by a team of black lion dancers who take his red envelope. Suddenly, a mysterious lone red lion dancer appears, takes the red envelope, and challenges the black lion to a Lettuce Picking Battle (a lion dancing tradition of masterfully scaling obstacles to grab a head of lettuce tied to a pole) using the stolen envelope. Both lions battle, scaling a scaffolding holding firecrackers, and the red lion wins, returning Gyun's red envelope. Gyun and the red lion run from the festival to escape the bullies, the red lion reveals to be a beautiful girl also named Gyun, a former lion dancing champion now Promotional Ambassador. She gives him her lion head and encourages him to pursue lion dancing, claiming that the flower of a cotton tree that fell on his head is proof that he is destined to be a hero. Later that night, Gyun makes a call to his parents, both wishing him Happy New Year and apologizing for not coming home to celebrate. Gyun says a prayer to a Buddha statue saying that he will compete in lion dancing to participate in the tournament in Guangzhou to see his parents and make them proud.

He enlists his friends to join his lion dancing team: a scrawney Mao and an overweight Guo. Mao would be the rear-end of the lion while Gou beats the drums, which they realized they don not have. While they parade the streets begging for a sponsor to buy them a drum, the black lion team recognizes the lion head they're holding. They smash the lion head and beat up the three boys. The boys determined to not give up, seek to enroll into a lion dancing school. However, since the local teacher is out of town, an elderly man points them into the direction of Qiang, an alcoholic salted fish seller. Qiang was once a profound lion dancer but gave up on the practice to settle down with his wife Jane and make a living. The boys relentlessly pursue him during his deliveries to beg him into teaching them. Qiang agrees to teach them since they volunteered to help him with his deliveries. Jane who was originally against Qiang returning to lion dancing eventually opens ups to him teaching the boys and they all grow close as the boys train. Qiang eventually takes the boys to buy a drum and red lion costume, and they compete against in a friendly match of Lettuce Picking against the students of local school they initially tried to enroll. The students completely obliterates the boys, and Qiang tells them they have a long way before they are ready to compete, but still to not give up. As the boys physically train and build muscle, their experience in lion dance becomes better and better. Qiang then tells the boys about how the pillars that lion dancers dance upon represent the peaks of mountains, and that every lion dancing pillars have one impossibly high pillar present called the Sky Pillar. The Sky Pillar exists to represent humility and that there will always be a mountain too high for lions to climb.

Some time passes, and the boys eventually compete in a qualifiers match to eventually compete in Guangzhou. As Qiang goes to get water for the boys, he is discouraged as he overhears clients complaining to Jane while she is delivering the fish by herself, insulting Qiang for still lion dancing in his old age instead of supporting his wife. Qiang gets cold feet and wants to help her deliver the fish instead of supporting the boys in their tournament. Jane tells him that she always loved his lion dancing but persuaded him against it because of pressure from her family and neighbors, and that she was wrong for taking away his dream. She convinces him to go back and support the boys in their tournament. Qiang comes to the tournament far too late, but realizes the boys won the qualifications. As Qiang, Jane, and the boys celebrate, Gyun hears from a neighbor that his parents have came home from Guangzhou early. Estatic, Gyun rushes home only to find why. Gyun's father fell into a coma after a construction accident with no news on potential recovery. Gyun leaves the village to find work in Guangzhou to provide for his family, his friends leave him a lion head so that he can still find time to practice while he is in the city.

Time passes, and Gyun takes up numerous jobs to send money back home. Meanwhile, Qiang, Mao, and Gou also work to provide some money for Gyun's family as well. Gyun slowly becomes more and more distant as he is working, calling home less and less. His friends and teacher, no longer receiving his calls, worry that he may not come back to compete. Gyun eventually meets up with Gyun, the girl that originally gifted him the red lion head. She is disheartened to see that he is not lion dancing, and told him the reason she persuaded him to be a lion dancer was because she was not allowed to be one professionally by her parents, and hoped that someone that shared the same name as her could make a career out of lion dancing in her place. While delivering food, Gyun comes across Team Limitless, a team of white lion dancers who bully him for delivering their food so late. It is revealed that Gyun did not intentionally give up on lion dancing, and was still practicing between jobs. However, because he strained himself working various jobs, he injured his foot and was not as graceful as he once was. He packs up and prepares to go home.

While on the way to the train station, Gyun's coworker convinces him to stay for a few minutes and watch the lion dancing tournament, the one that Gyun was supposed to be competing in. Because Gyun never showed up, Qiang had to take his place as the lion head. Qiang, Mao, and Gou compete in the tournament under the name Team Salted Fish, and immediately catches the attention of the audience and the other contestants for his age and talent. As the contestants compete in an obstacle course, some of the lions agreed to collaborate to take down Team Salted Fish. Qiang attempts to foil the other contestants by racing the course barefoot, causing the contestants to be nauseated by the smell. The plan only briefly works and Team Salted Fish is badly beaten. However Gyun rushes in with his lion head at the last minute to compete as Team Salted Fish's second lion, and successfully completes the obstacle course. Successfully reunited, Team Salted Fish moves on to the semi-finals, gaining the respect of the black lion dances that originally bullied them.

Team Salted Fish soon win the semi-finals and now compete against Team Limitless in a final obstacle course in a Lettuce Picking Battle. Both lions race across the course and eventually both grab pieces of the lettuce, declaring it a tie. The tie-breaker round would be an exhibition performance on pillars modified to be far more difficult, while judged on choreography. Team Limitless goes first and gracefully completes the course. However, its reveals that Gyun severely injured his foot during the previous final match, calling for Qiang to forfeit. Gyun refuses and chooses to continue the tournament. While dancing across the course, Gyun and Mao move precariously, broke their lion head, and almost fell, but still managed across the pillars. Just as they were about to finish the course, Gyun realizes that their mistakes and broken lion head would not be enough points to win, so he wants to make an attempt at the Sky Pillar. Everyone realizing that Team Salted Fish is attempting the impossible, the other teams beat their drums in encouragement, as Mao throws Gyun towards the pillar. At the last second, Gyun throws his lion head at the Sky Pillar and he falls into the water below. The crowd goes ecstatic and Team Salted Fish wins the tournament, as the broken red lion head landed on top of the Sky Pillar. Back at home, a lion visits a Buddha statue and Gyun's father slowly wakes up. An after-credit scene shows Gyun in a college dorm with pictures of his family, his friends, his teacher, and the tournament on the wall.

== Voice cast ==
- Li Xin as Gyun (Liu Jiajuan)
- Chen Ye Xiong as Mao (Liu Fu Jun)
- Guo Hao as Gou (Liu Zhixiong)
- Li Meng as Qiang (Xie Guoqiang)
- Li Jia Si as Zhen (Xu Hui Zhen)
- Cai Zhuangzhuang as Chen Zhuangcheng
- Qiu Mu as Ah Juan (Xu Juanran)
- Xiong Chenjie as Gyun's mother
- Ma Yufei as Gyun's father
- Bach as Gyun's grandfather
- Fu Bowen as the Host of Lion Dance Final Competition
- Wang Yuanying as the Lion Dance Master
- Chenglin Liu as Juvenile Gyun

== Controversy ==
A trailer for I Am What I Am attracted controversy on Weibo for being offensive due to the perceived exaggerated slanted eyes of the Chinese characters. Producer Zhang Miao defended the character design as aesthetic confidence as opposed to a traditional Western design of Asian characters in animation.

== Release ==
The film was released in China on December 17, 2021, and was produced and distributed by Beijing Splendid Culture & Entertainment Co., Ltd. in digital 2D, IMAX 2D, China Giant Screen 2D, and CINITY 2D. In December 2021, the film was included in the fifteenth batch of the Chinese National Copyright Administration's warning list for copyright protection of key works of the year 2021. On December 28, 2021, the production team officially announced the addition of a digital 2D Cantonese version.

== Reception ==
The movie was widely praised despite its modest box office takings. Peter Debruge of Variety called it a "ridiculously satisfying underdog sports story", saying, "The result is an inspired mix of engineering and ingenuity, distinguished by some of the most human character animation this side of the uncanny valley — not realistic, mind you, but relatable, and a welcome departure from the cutesy cartoony-ness of Pixar and its American ilk. [...] While I Am What I Am clearly speaks to various national-identity issues, the feelings represented are universal. There’s something to be said for how it celebrates characters from the bottom of society, like working-class Juan."

In CBR, Reuben Baron wrote, "20 years ago, a film that looks like I Am What I Am couldn't exist. What makes [it] downright groundbreaking on top of being gorgeous is that it was a low-budget independent production. For an indie to surpass even the stunning work bigger-budget animated films have accomplished [...] feels like as big a deal for CG films as District 9 and Ex Machina were for indie special effects. [...] Those curious about the future of independent animation will find a lot to appreciate when they get the chance to see it."

=== Accolades ===
Year	Award	Prize	Receiver	Result	Reference
2022	25th New York International Children's Film Festival	Feature Films Grand Prize	I Am What I Am	Nominated	
2022	19th Festival Nits de cinema oriental de Vic	The Audience Award	I Am What I Am	Won	
2022	19th Festival Nits de cinema oriental de Vic	The Critics Award	I Am What I Am	Won	
2024	Chinese Film Directors' Association Recognition 2020–2023	Movie of the Year (2021)	I Am What I Am	Nominated	
2024	Chinese Film Directors' Association Recognition 2020–2023	Special Jury Honors (2021)	I Am What I Am	Won	
2024	Chinese Film Directors' Association Recognition 2020–2023	Screenwriter of the Year (2021)	Li Zelin	Nominated	

== Expanded franchise ==
=== Sequel ===
The sequel, I Am What I Am 2, was released in 2024; its footage was first released at the 2023 Beijing Spendid Annual Launch. In order to earn money for his father's medical treatment, Gyun, a nobody who comes to Shanghai for work, agrees to participate in the “Shanghai Fight Night” martial arts competition on behalf of the declining Chuanwu Kung Fu Gym, for which he has to overcome all the masters, prejudices and himself.

=== Novel ===
The book I Am What I Am, published by Shanghai Translation Publishing House in 2023, is adapted from the animated film of the same name released at the end of 2021. The author is Li Zelin.

The novel tells the story of Gyun, a left-behind youth who is often bullied. Driven by his passion for lion dancing, he forms a lion dance team with his friends Mao and Gou. Under the training of Qiang, they endure many challenges, transforming from “sick cats” into “lions.” This realist work not only celebrates the dreams of ordinary people in extraordinary times but also praises the indomitable spirit of young people who refuse to give in and fight against fate.

=== Musical ===
On October 10, 2023, the cast of the Mandarin premiere of the musical I Am What I Am was officially announced. This musical, adapted from the Chinese animated film of the same name, is an original production by the Guangzhou Opera House. It highlights Lingnan’s lion dance culture, local customs, and the enduring spirit of hard work and perseverance characteristic of the Guangfu culture.

The show stars Fang Shujian, Guo Hongxu, Chen Keming, Jordan Chan, Kit Chan, and others. It had its national premiere at the Guangzhou Opera House from January 11 to 14, 2024.
