= I Am (American band) =

American alternative rock band

- Origin: Las Vegas, Nevada
- Genres: Alternative rock, progressive rock
- Years active: 1995
- Labels: U Call It Productions
- Members: Frank Klepacki; Greg Greer; Dan Ryan; Rod Arnett (as pictured)

I Am (often stylized as I AM) was an alternative progressive rock band formed in Las Vegas in 1995 and disbanded the same year. The rhythm section of the defunct band Shatterbone created the group and released an album in 1995. The band featured Greg Greer on vocals, Rod Arnett on bass, Dan Ryan on guitar, and video game music composer Frank Klepacki on drums.

== There's a Home ==
Their first and only album, There's a Home (1995), featured thirteen original tracks (one hidden) drawing influences from Tool and Soundgarden. The hidden thirteenth track, "I will...", simply features a man reciting self-help instructions and a humorous mantra — "the louder the apartment, the happier I will be."

The eleventh track, Destructible Times, was used the same year in the video game Command & Conquer, specifically in the credits for the Brotherhood of Nod faction. Developers at Westwood Studios requested the song's use because it "reflected the war aspect and bad-ass vibe of [Nod's] side." The band was once recorded live while performing this song. There's a Home was the first commercial album Klepacki's playing appeared on; he wrote several songs for the band. After the group broke up, Klepacki joined Home Cookin' while Arnett and Ryan formed Beatknuckle. Klepacki still supports the band's music, offering There's a Home for sale on his website along with a t-shirt referencing Destructible Times.

== Band members ==
- Rod Arnett - Bass guitar
- Greg Greer - vocals
- Frank Klepacki - drums
- Dan Ryan - Acoustic and electric guitar

== Discography ==
- There's a Home – 1995
