= Australian Recording Industry Association =

Australian music industry trade group

- Trade name: ARIA (1970s–present); Australian Recording Industry Association (1970s–present)
- Type: Trade group
- Founded: 1970s
- Headquarters: Sydney, New South Wales
- Number of locations: Australia
- Website: aria.com.au

The Australian Recording Industry Association (ARIA) is a trade association representing the Australian recording industry which was established in the 1970s by six major record companies: EMI, Festival, CBS, RCA, WEA and Universal, replacing the Association of Australian Record Manufacturers (AARM) which was formed in 1956. It oversees the collection, administration and distribution of music licences and royalties.

The association has more than 190 members, including small labels typically run by one to five people, medium-size organisations and very large companies with international affiliates. ARIA is administered by a board of directors comprising senior executives from record companies, both large and small.

== History ==
In 1956, the Association of Australian Record Manufacturers (AARM) was formed by Australia's major record companies. It was replaced in the 1970s by the Australian Recording Industry Association, which was established by the six major record companies operating in Australia, EMI (now part of Universal Music Group), Festival Records, CBS (now known as Sony Music), RCA (now part of Sony Music), WEA (now known as Warner Music Group) and Polygram (now known as Universal). It later included smaller record companies representing independent acts/labels and has over 100 members. By 1997, the six major labels provided 90% of all recordings made in Australia. ARIA is administered by a board of directors comprising senior executives from record companies, both large and small.

== ARIA charts ==
The ARIA Charts is the main Australian music sales charts, issued weekly by the Australian Recording Industry Association. The charts are a record of the highest selling singles and albums in various genres. All charts are compiled from data of both physical and digital sales from retailers in Australia.

The first printed national top 50 chart available in record stores, branded the Countdown chart, was dated the week ending 10 July 1983.

ARIA began compiling its own charts in-house from the chart survey dated 13 June 1988, corresponding with the printed top 50 chart dated the week ending 26 June 1988, at which time it became the official Australian chart.

== ARIA certifications ==
=== Current accreditation levels ===
A music single or album qualifies for a platinum certification if it exceeds 70,000 copies shipped to retailers and a gold certification for 35,000 copies shipped. The diamond certification was created in November 2015 to mark 500,000 sales/shipments. The diamond award includes an aggregation of sales of albums plus the sales of the tracks from that album after 1 July 2014, where 10 track sales equal one album. A silver certification for albums was introduced in November 2024. The silver award applies only to albums by Australian artists, released no earlier than 2021 and the required level of 20,000 units must be achieved within three years of the album's release.

For music DVDs (formerly videos), a gold accreditation originally represented 7,500 copies shipped, with a platinum accreditation representing 15,000 units shipped.

Format	Current accreditation levels			
Format	Silver	Gold	Platinum	Diamond
Album	20,000	35,000 (Note: Album figures can include "stream equivalent albums" since May 2017.)	70,000	500,000
Single	—N/a	35,000 (Note: Single figures can include "qualifying streams" since July 2015. Since March 2022 this also includes Official Content streams on YouTube.)	70,000	—N/a
Music DVD	—N/a	7,500	15,000	—N/a

=== Former accreditation levels ===
On 1 January 1977, the Australian Record Industry Association announced major revisions in its accreditation awards system. No longer were awards based on dollar terms but, rather, unit sales. Gold records will be awarded to singles selling 50,000 units, EPs selling 30,000 units and albums selling 20,000 units.

At the same time, the industry introduced a platinum award in recognition of the growth achievement of the Australian market. Platinum awards were issued to singles selling 100,000 and albums selling 50,000 units.

Format	Accreditation levels used from 1977 until 1983	
Format	Gold	Platinum
Album	20,000	50,000
Extended plays	30,000	—N/a
Single	50,000	100,000

Prior to 1977, awards were based on dollar value rather than unit sales and only issued gold awards.

Format	Accreditation levels used until 1976
Format	Gold
Album and single	$50,000

== ARIA Awards ==
=== ARIA No. 1 Chart Awards ===
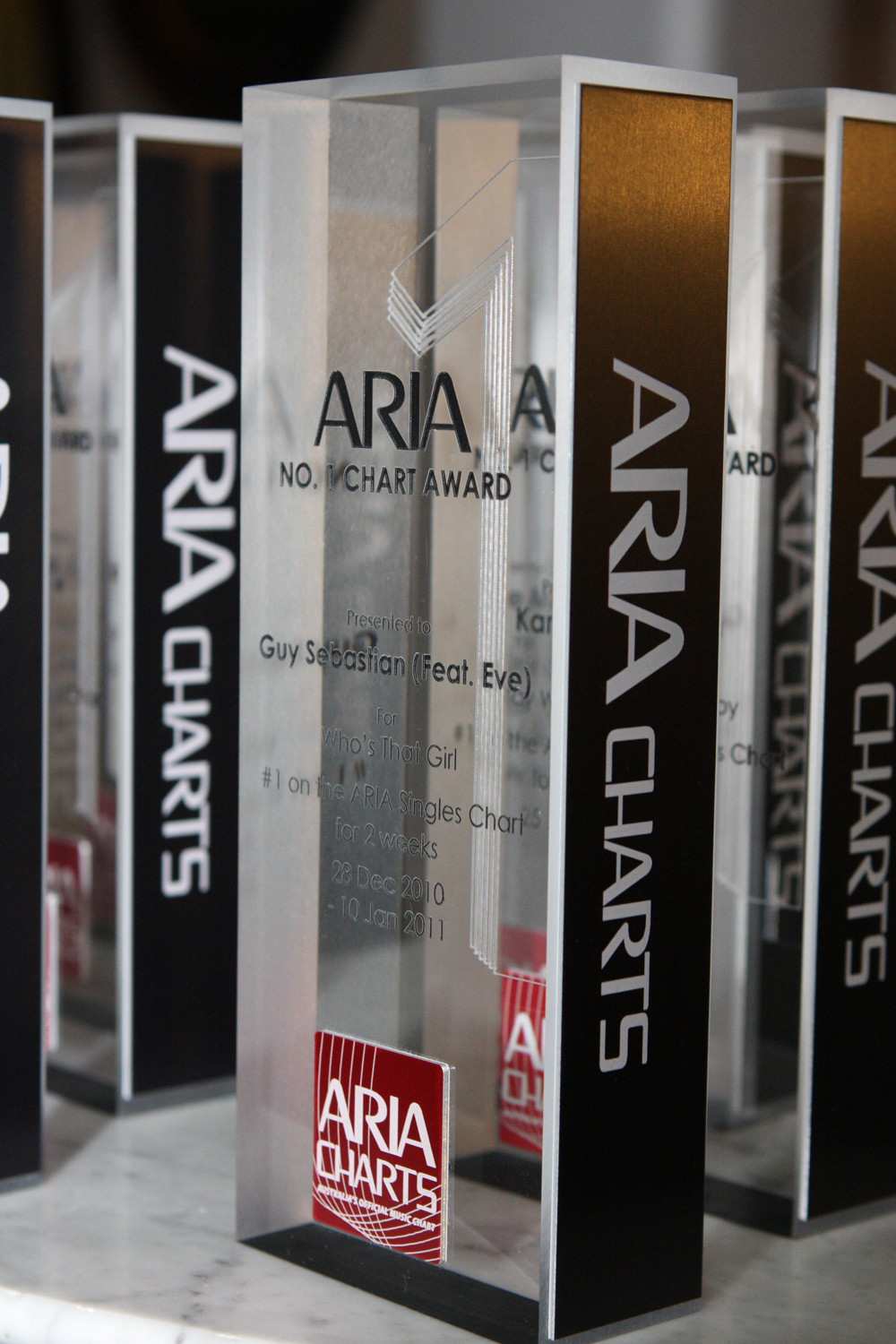
The ARIA Chart Award trophy

The ARIA No. 1 Chart Awards were established in 2002 to recognise Australian recording artists, who reached number one on the ARIA albums, singles and music DVDs charts. Since May 2014, international artists have also been eligible to receive the award. The awarding process is retroactive, meaning that records which peaked at number one prior to the introduction of the awards are still eligible to receive the award. A similar Australian Chart #1 Awards was established in August 2024, awarded to artists topping the Australian Albums Chart and Australian Singles Chart.

=== ARIA Music Awards ===
The ARIA Music Awards is an annual series of awards nights celebrating the Australian music industry. The event has been held annually since 1987; it encompasses the general genre-specific and popular awards known as the ARIA Awards, as well as the Fine Arts Awards and Artisan Awards (held separately from 2004), Lifetime Achievement Awards and the ARIA Hall of Fame (held separately from 2005 to 2010 but returned to the general ceremony in 2011).

Australian TV pop music show Countdown presented its own annual awards ceremony, Countdown Music and Video Awards, which was co-produced by Carolyn James (also known as Carolyn Bailey) during 1981–1984 in collaboration with ARIA. ARIA provided peer voting for some awards, while Countdown provided coupons in the related Countdown Magazine for viewers to vote for populist awards. At the 1985 Countdown awards ceremony, held on 14 April 1986, fans of INXS and Uncanny X-Men scuffled during the broadcast and as a result ARIA decided to hold their own awards.

Since 2 March 1987, ARIA administered its own entirely peer-voted ARIA Music Awards, to "recognise excellence and innovation in all genres of Australian music" with an annual ceremony. Initially included in the same awards ceremonies, it established the ARIA Hall of Fame in 1988 and has held separate annual ceremonies since 2005. The ARIA Hall of Fame "honours Australian musicians' achievements that have had a significant impact in Australia or around the world".

== Criticisms ==
Like most recording industry associations, ARIA has been criticised for fighting copyright infringement matters aggressively, although in Australia this has largely taken the form of aggressive advertising campaigns particularly in cinemas directly preceding movies. This criticism is stauncher in Australia due to the absence of an equivalent Digital Millennium Copyright Act or state crimes acts which clearly establish copyright infringement as a crime.

In February 2004, the Australian Record Industry Association (ARIA) took legal action against Kazaa, alleging copyright breaches. The trial began on 29 November 2004. On 6 February 2005, the homes of two Sharman Networks executives and the offices of Sharman Networks in Australia were raided under a court order by ARIA to gather evidence for the trial.

ARIA has been criticised by former Australian Idol judge and record producer Ian Dickson for a perceived intolerance of Australian Idol contestants, and a lack of nomination in the ARIA Awards.

== See also ==
- Music of Australia
