= Brian Mannix =

Australian rock music singer and actor (born 1961)

- Born: Brian Francis Mannix; 7 October 1961 (age 65); Melbourne, Victoria, Australia
- Genres: Pop, rock
- Occupations: Singer, actor
- Instrument: Vocals
- Years active: 1980–present
- Formerly of: Uncanny X-Men
- Spouse: Susan Mannix

Brian Francis Mannix (born 7 October 1961) is an Australian pop, rock music singer and actor. As lead singer, he was the founding mainstay of Uncanny X-Men (1980–1987). Mannix co-wrote their top 5 single, "50 Years" (1985). He undertook a solo career, while also participating in Uncanny X-Men reformations. Mannix collaborated with various fellow musical artists in 1980s-themed shows. He regularly appeared on television pop music quiz show, Spicks and Specks (2005–2011).

== Early years ==
Brian Francis Mannix was born on 7 October 1961. He attended St Francis De Sales Primary School in Oak Park and then St Bernard's College in Essendon. After finishing year 12, Mannix applied for Swinburne Film and Television School but was not accepted. He undertook various "normal jobs" for about a year before turning to a music career.

== 1981–1987: Uncanny X-Men ==
From 1981 to 1987, Mannix was the founding mainstay, lead singer and guitarist of Australian pop, rock band Uncanny X-Men, which formed in Melbourne. Besides Mannix the initial line-up included Micheal Helms on bass guitar and Nick Matandos on drums. Later members were Ron Thiessen on guitar, Chuck Hargreaves on guitar, Steve Harrison on bass guitar, John Kirk on bass guitar, Craig Waugh on drums, Joey Amenta on guitar and Brett Kingman on guitar. Australian musicologist, Ian McFarlane, described Mannix as "hyperactive, mischievous", who gained a reputation for "comic send-ups of other well-known artists".

Uncanny X-Men released two studio albums, 'Cos Life Hurts (1985, No. 3) and What You Give Is What You Get (1986, No. 19). Mannix wrote or co-wrote their hit singles, "The Party" (No. 18), "50 Years" (No. 4, both 1985) and "I Am" (1986, No. 18). At the 1985 Countdown Music and Video Awards (held in April 1986), they were nominated for Most Popular Australian Group and Mannix was nominated for Most Popular Male Performer. Uncanny X-Men disbanded in 1987, however Mannix periodically reformed the group for occasional performances (1998, 2006, 2011, 2017), including for Countdown Spectacular from June to August 2006.

In 1986, Mannix, while still a member of Uncanny X-Men, made his acting debut as Max in television medical drama series, The Flying Doctors.

== 1988–present: solo career ==
Mannix appeared as Mal in Daniel Abineri's musical theatre play, Bad Boy Johnny and the Prophets of Doom, from 16 September 1989. In the following year, he released a self-titled debut studio album, preceded by its single, "Beautiful People". Penelope Layland of The Canberra Times was disappointed by the album's "superficially attractive arrangements, its clever technical tricks and its fundamental lack of inspiration... to string together a bunch of fairly weak creative ideas." Neither album nor single charted on the Kent Music Report top 100.

In 1993 Mannix took the guest role of Connor Cleary in the Australian television soap opera, Neighbours. In November 1998, he wrote and directed a stage play, Countdown: The Musical Comedy, with Molly Meldrum portrayed by Michael Veitch. McFarlane observed "[it] was a loving and funny tribute to the Countdown era. It may have been shameless nostalgia, but with Veitch perfectly cast as Molly it was a hell of a lot of fun". It toured Australia through 1998 to 1999 and, in 2009, was revamped as Can't Believe It's not Countdown – It's a Musical Comedy. Mannix also wrote and directed the musical comedy, theatre play, The Bench, which was performed at the Comedy Club, Carlton in March–April 2001.

In 2006, Mannix was part of the Absolutely 80s tour, which played venues across the country and involved other popular eighties artists from Boom Crash Opera, Kids in the Kitchen, the Black Sorrows, the Choirboys and Wa Wa Nee. The tour continued through to 2018. In September 2006, he performed at the AFL Grand Final.

In 2012, Mannix appeared as a contestant the twelfth season of Australian version of television celebrity show, Dancing with the Stars, placing fifth. From mid-2016 to early 2017, he was cast as Buddy, in the stage musical, We Will Rock You.

== Discography ==
=== Albums ===
List of EPs, with selected details
Title	Details
Brian Mannix	Released: 1990; Label: Musicland Releases; Format: LP, MC, CD
Brian Mannix & The Frothy Green Discharge	Released: 2006; Label: Brian Mannix; Format: CD

== Awards and nominations ==
=== Countdown Australian Music Awards ===
Countdown was an Australian pop music TV series on national broadcaster ABC-TV from 1974 to 1987, it presented music awards from 1979 to 1987, initially in conjunction with magazine TV Week. The TV Week / Countdown Awards were a combination of popular-voted and peer-voted awards.

Year	Nominee / work	Award	Result
1985	himself	Most Popular Male Performer	Nominated
