= Sarah Blasko discography =

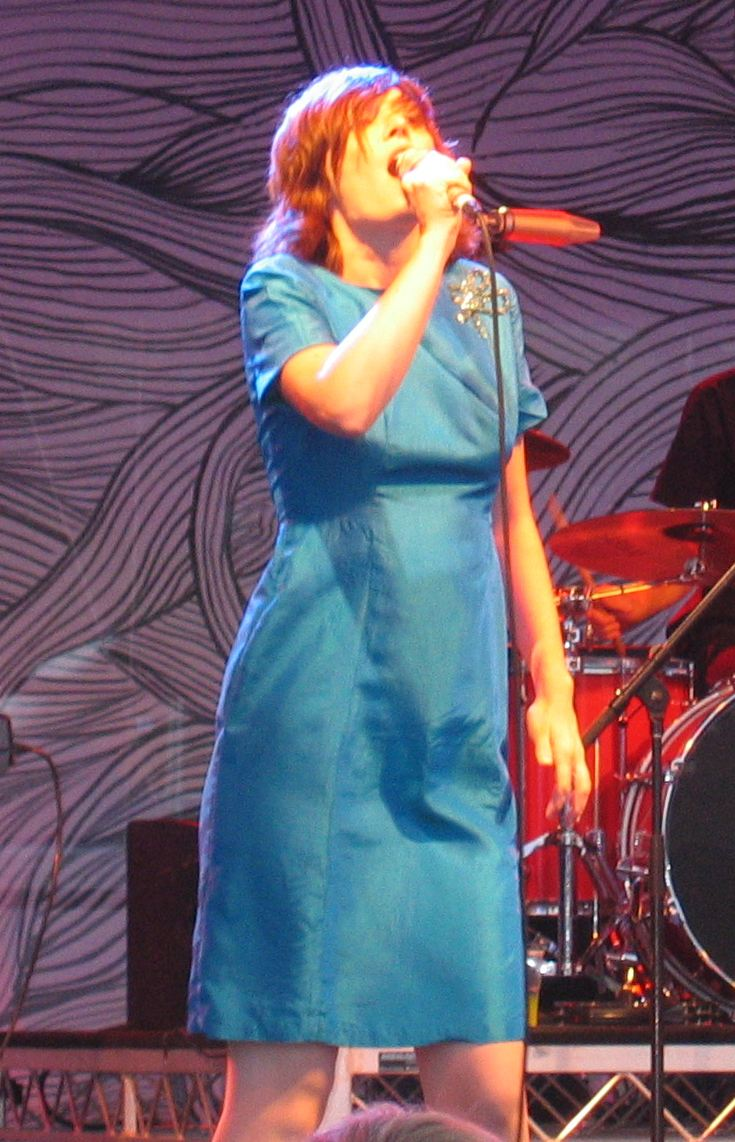
- Sarah Blasko in 2024
- Studio albums: 7
- EPs: 3
- Live albums: 3
- Singles: 24
- Album appearances: 5

The discography of Australian recording artist Sarah Blasko consists of seven studio albums, three live album, three extended plays and twenty-four singles.

== Albums ==
=== Studio albums ===
List of albums, with selected chart positions and certifications
Title	Album details	Peak chart positions						Certifications
Title	Album details	AUS	BEL	FRA	SWE	SWI	UK	Certifications
The Overture & the Underscore	Released: 11 October 2004; Label: Dew Process; Formats: CD, digital download	35	—	—	—	—	—	ARIA: Platinum
What the Sea Wants, the Sea Will Have	Released: 21 October 2006; Label: Dew Process; Formats: CD, digital download	7	—	—	—	—	—	ARIA: Platinum
As Day Follows Night	Released: 10 July 2009; Label: Dew Process; Formats: CD, digital download	5	77	100	53	58	191	ARIA: Platinum
I Awake	Released: 26 October 2012; Label: Dew Process; Formats: CD, digital download	9	—	—	—	—	—	
Eternal Return	Released: 6 November 2015; Label: EMI; Formats: CD, digital download	6	—	—	—	—	—	
Depth of Field	Released: 23 February 2018; Label: EMI; Formats: CD, vinyl, digital download	5	—	—	—	—	—	
I Just Need to Conquer This Mountain	Released: 1 November 2024; Label: EMI; Formats: CD, vinyl, digital download	37	—	—	—	—	—	
"—" denotes releases that failed to chart.

=== Live albums ===
List of albums, with selected details
Title	Album details
Live at the Forum	Released: 9 July 2010; Format: CD, digital download; Label: Dew Process; Mix Engineer: Sam Lowe
I Awake: Live At the Sydney Opera House	Released: 2013; Format: CD, digital download; Label: Dew Process
As Day Follows Night Live (10th Anniversary Performance)	Released: 9 October 2020; Format: as digital download on Bandcamp; Engineered and Mixed: Matt Landers; Recorded at: The Old 505 Theatre, Sydney
I Just Need to Conquer This Mountain - Live At The Factory Theatre	Released: 25 February 2025; Format: as digital download on Bandcamp; Recorded at: The Factory, Sydney

== Extended plays ==
List of EPs, with selected details
Title	EP details
Prelusive	Released: September 2002; Format: CD, digital download; Label: Independent
Live at the Playroom	Released: 1 September 2007; Format: digital download; Label: Dew Process
Cinema Songs	Released: 3 October 2009; Format: CD, digital download; Label: Dew Process
Forgotten World	Released: 1 May 2026; Format: digital download; Label: EMI

== Singles ==
=== Charted or certified singles ===
List of singles, with selected chart positions within a national top 200
Year	Title	Peak chart positions		Certifications	Album
Year	Title	AUS	UK physical	Certifications	Album
2009	"All I Want"	64	—	ARIA: Gold	As Day Follows Night
2009	"We Won't Run"	44	—	ARIA: Platinum	As Day Follows Night
2010	"No Turning Back"	—	64		As Day Follows Night
2015	"I'd Be Lost" / "Only One"	177	—		Eternal Return
"—" denotes releases that failed to chart.

=== Charity singles ===
List of charity singles
Year	Title	Peak chart positions	Notes
Year	Title	AUS	Notes
2014	"I Touch Myself" (as part of the I Touch Myself Project)	72	The I Touch Myself Project launched in 2014 with a mission to encourage young women to touch themselves regularly to find early signs of cancer.

=== Other appearances ===
List of other non-single song appearances
Title	Year	Album
"Your Way"	2003	Triple J Home and Hosed (The First Harvest)
"Don't Dream It's Over"	2005	She Will Have Her Way: Songs of Tim and Neil Finn
"Got You on My Radar", "The Weight Just Right", "Song for Val" & "Got Your Hooks In"	2005	The New Violence by Peabody
"Flame Trees"	2005	Little Fish
"Nothing in the Way"	2006	Emptiness Is Our Business by GB3
"Goodbye Yellow Brick Road"	2006	Triple J - Like a Version 2
"Bye, Bye Pride" & "Hold Your Horses" (with Darren Hanlon)	2007	Write Your Adventures Down (A Tribute to the Go-Betweens)
"By This River" (with Holly Throsby)	2007	One of You for Me by Holly Throsby
"Flame Trees"	2010	Tomorrow, When the War Began
"Hey Ya!"	2011	Triple J - Like a Version 7
"I Love It When It Rains"	2011	ReWiggled - A Tribute to the Wiggles
"Life On Mars"	2016	Triple J - Like a Version 12
"A Spell" (with Jack Colwell)	2020	Swandream by Jack Colwell
"I Promise it All to You" (with Marlophone)	2026	Remembered Adventures in Widescale
"Dance on Fire"	2026	Forever Young by War Child Australia
