= ARIA Award for Best Female Artist =

Former Australian music award

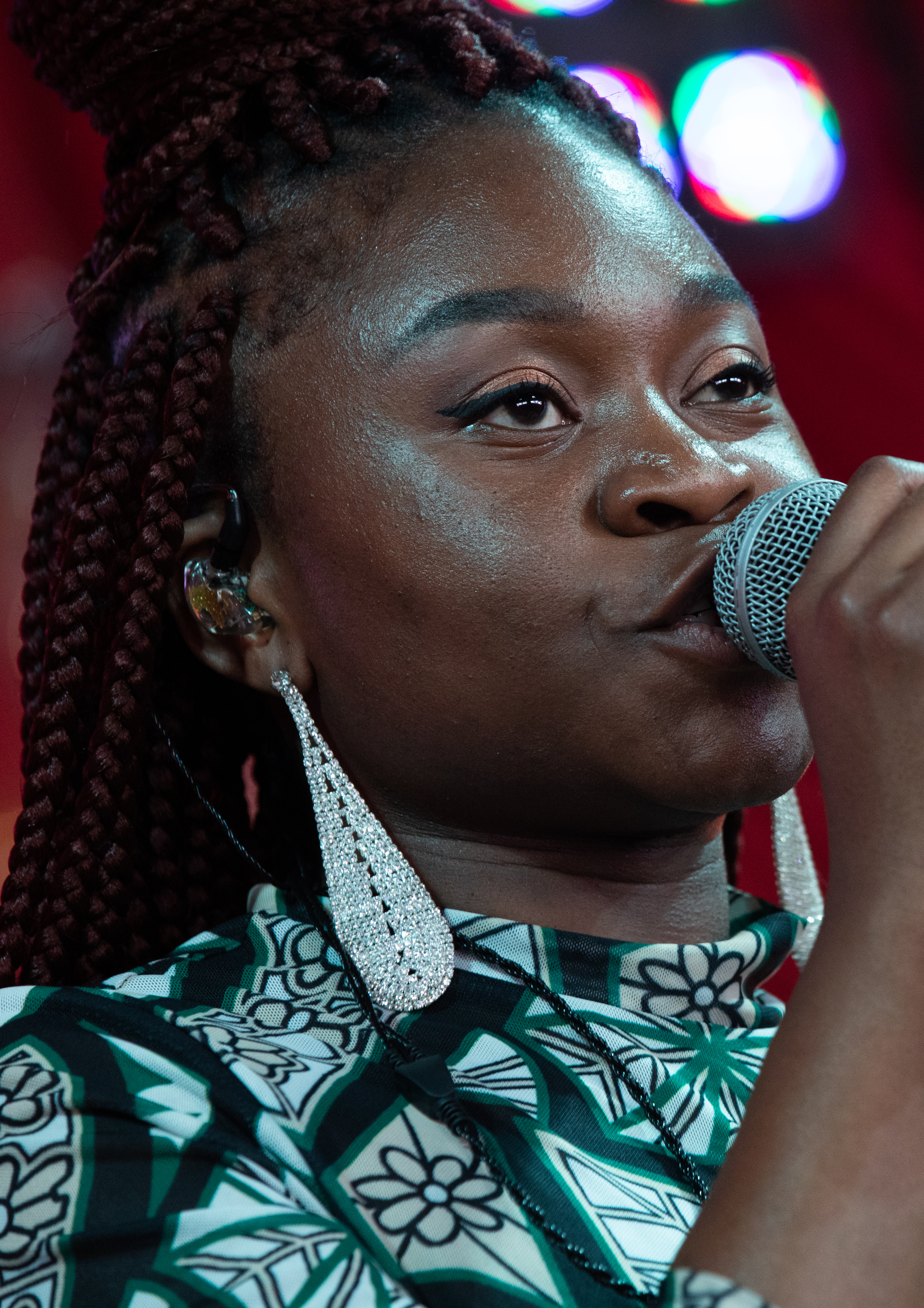
- 2020 winner Sampa the Great
- Country: Australia
- Presented by: Australian Recording Industry Association (ARIA)
- First award: 1987
- Final award: 2020
- Currently held by: Sampa the Great, The Return (2020)

Highlights
- Most wins: Kasey Chambers, Wendy Matthews and Sia (3 each)
- Most nominations: Kylie Minogue (14)
- Website: ariaawards.com.au

The ARIA Music Award for Best Female Artist was an award presented at the annual ARIA Music Awards, which recognised "the many achievements of Aussie artists across all music genres", since 1987. It was handed out by the Australian Recording Industry Association (ARIA), an organisation whose aim is "to advance the interests of the Australian record industry."

To be eligible, the female artist had to meet one of the following criteria: be an Australian citizen; be born in Australia; be a permanent resident or have applied for permanent residency (having lived in Australia for at least six months for two consecutive years prior to the awards and signed to an Australian record label in the case of an applicant); if they are from New Zealand they must have lived in Australia for at least six months for two consecutive years prior to the awards and signed to an Australian record label.

The ARIA Award for Best Female Artist was given to a female artist who had a single or an album appear in the ARIA Top 100 Singles Chart during the eligibility period, and was voted for by a judging academy, which consisted of 1,000 members from different areas of the music industry.

The award for Best Female Artist was first presented to Jenny Morris in 1987. Wendy Matthews, Sia and Kasey Chambers hold the record for the most wins, with three each, followed by Morris, Kate Ceberano, Natalie Imbruglia, Missy Higgins and Kimbra, the only artist to win both her nominations, with two. Six of those artists won in two consecutive years; Morris in 1987 and 1988, Ceberano in 1989 and 1990, Matthews in 1993 and 1994, Imbruglia in 1998 and 1999, Kimbra in 2011 and 2012 and Sia in 2016 and 2017. Kylie Minogue has received 14 nominations, more than any other artist, winning one in 2001 for her album Light Years (2000). Ceberano and Matthews received separate nominations for the same album, You've Always Got the Blues, in 1989, with the former winning.

This and the ARIA Award for Best Male Artist were merged in 2021 to form a single award for Best Artist.This change was designed to ensure that the ARIA Awards reflect and embrace equality and the true diversity of the music industry in 2021. In making this change, the number of nominees for Best Artist will be ten.

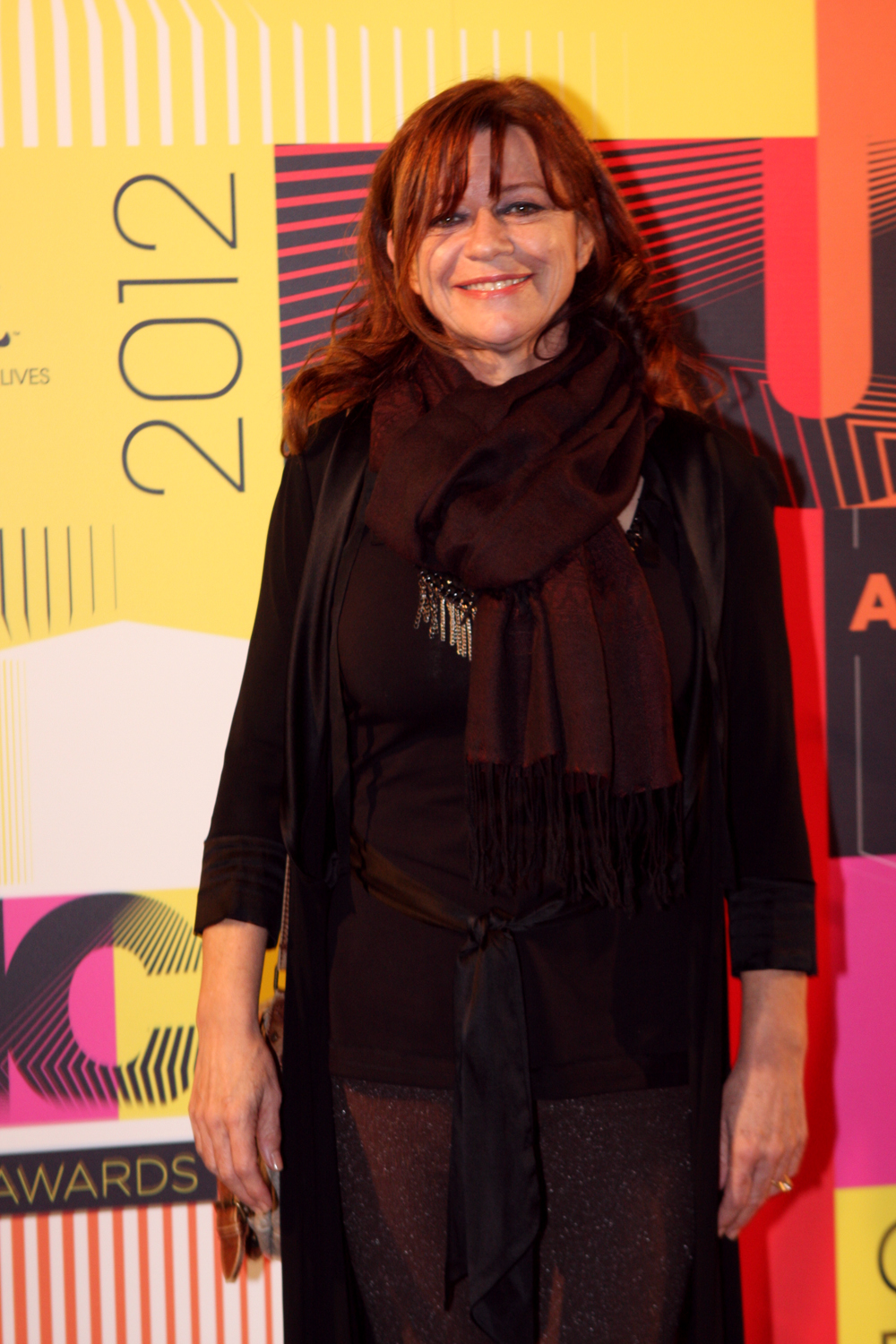
Jenny Morris won twice: for "You're Gonna Get Hurt" in 1987, and in 1988 for Body and Soul (1987).

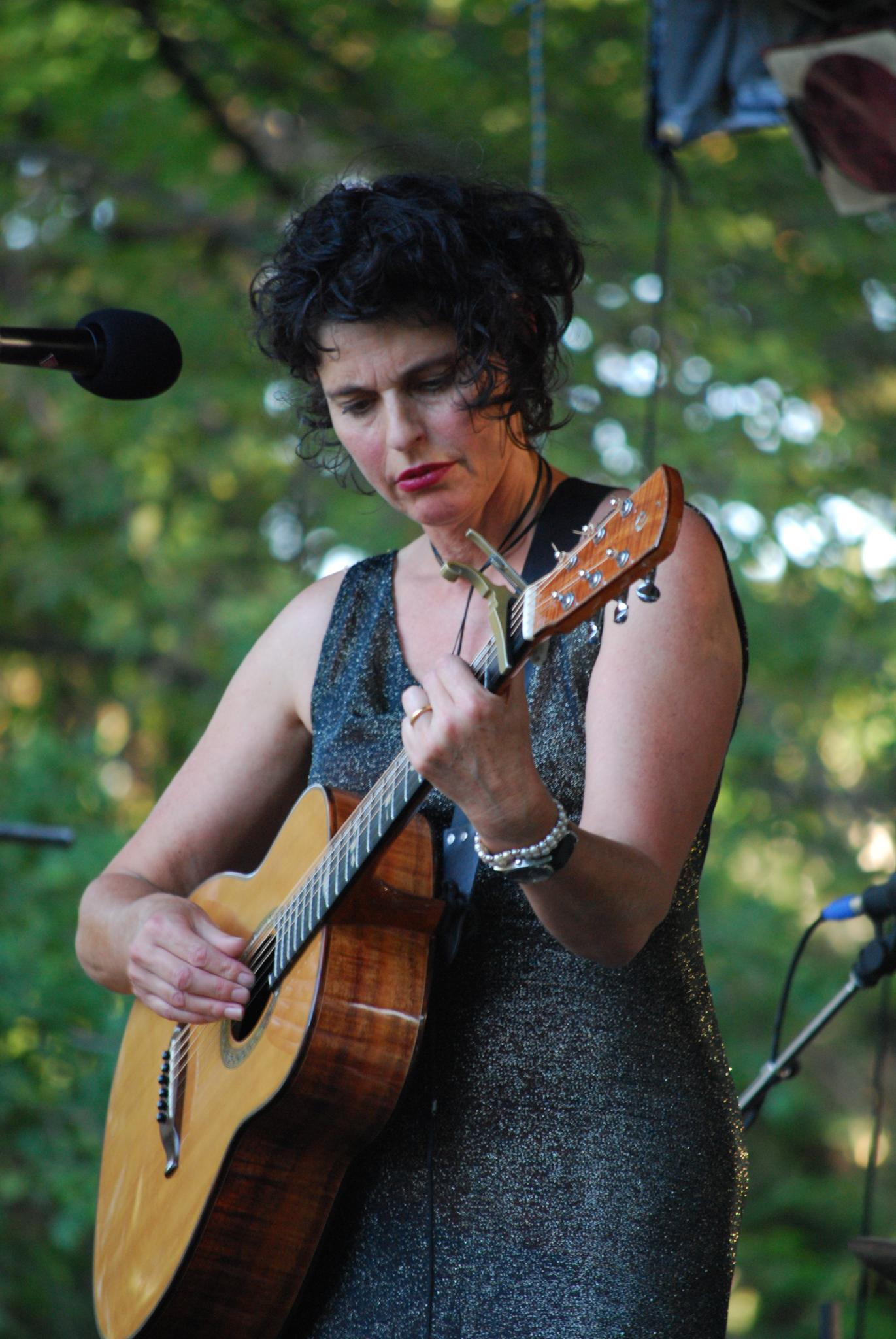
Deborah Conway won in 1992 for String of Pearls (1991).

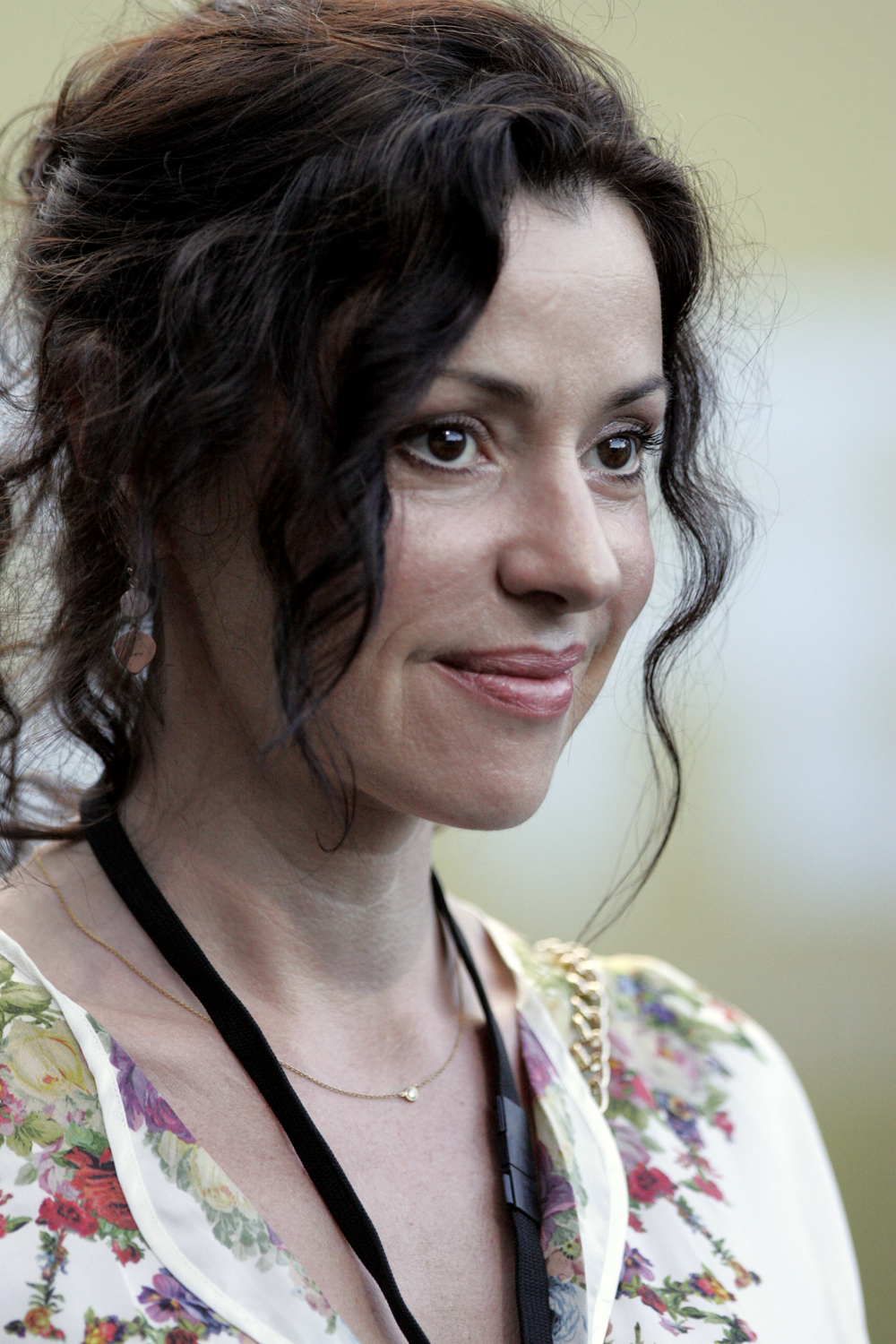
Tina Arena won in 1995 for Don't Ask (1994).

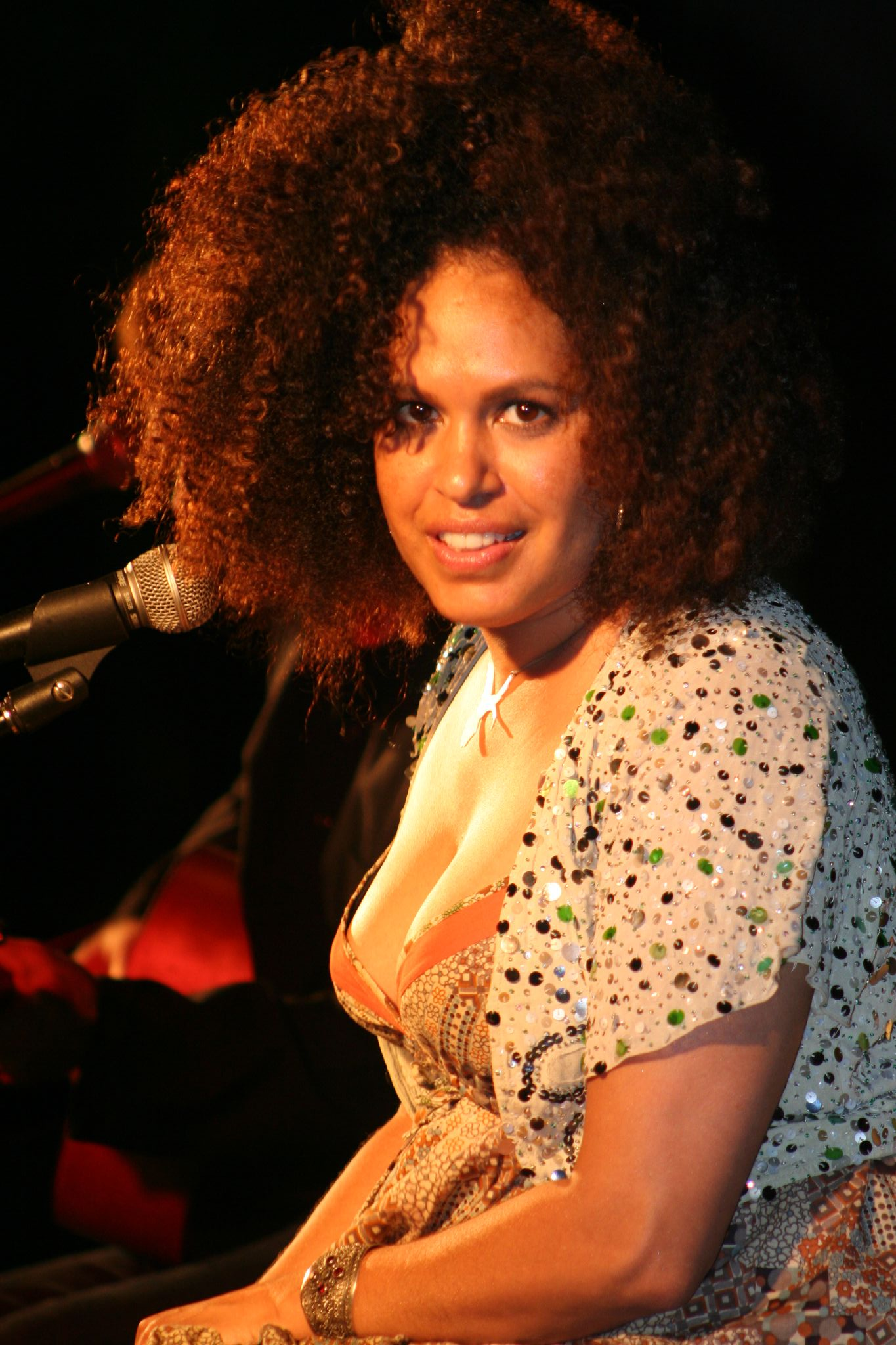
Christine Anu won in 1996 for Come On.

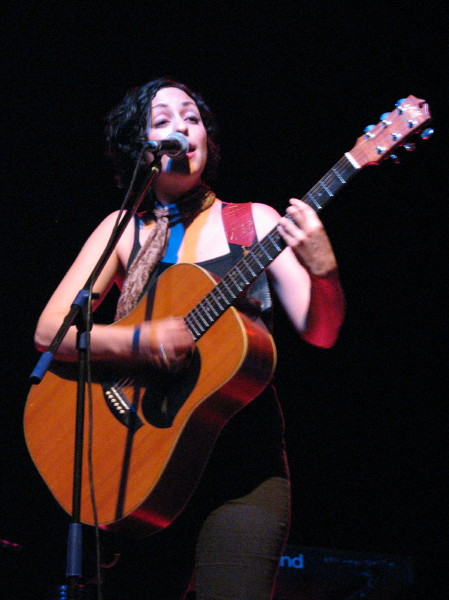
Monique Brumby won in 1997 for Mary.

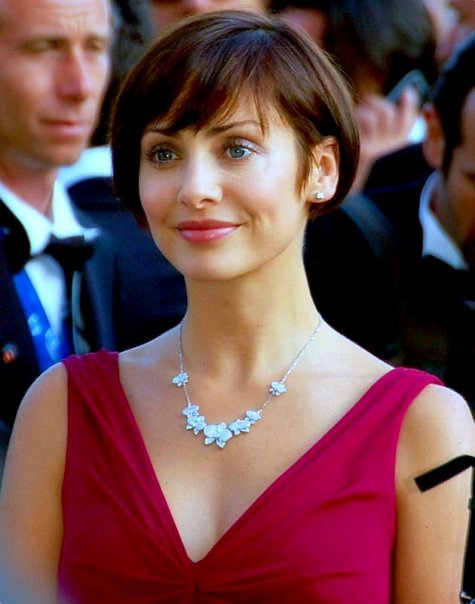
Natalie Imbruglia won twice for Left of the Middle (1997) in 1998 and Wishing I Was There in 1999.

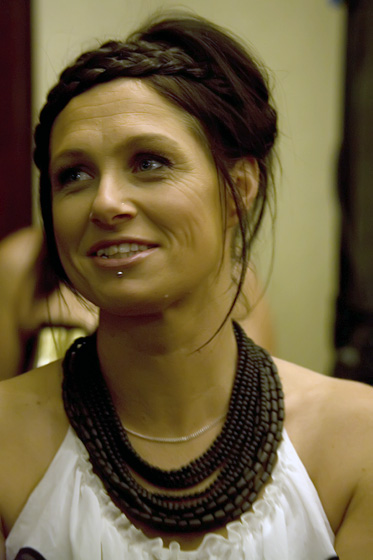
Along with Wendy Matthews, Kasey Chambers has the most wins with three in 2000, 2002 and 2004 for "The Captain", Barricades & Brickwalls (2001) and Wayward Angel (2004), respectively.

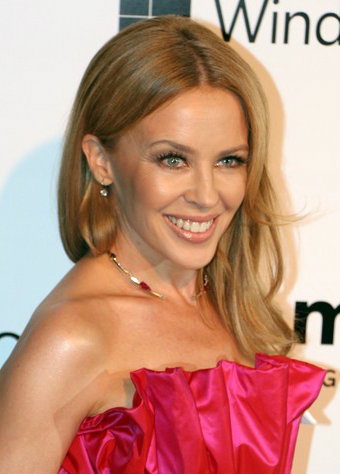
Kylie Minogue has been nominated the most in this category with 14, winning once for Light Years (2001).

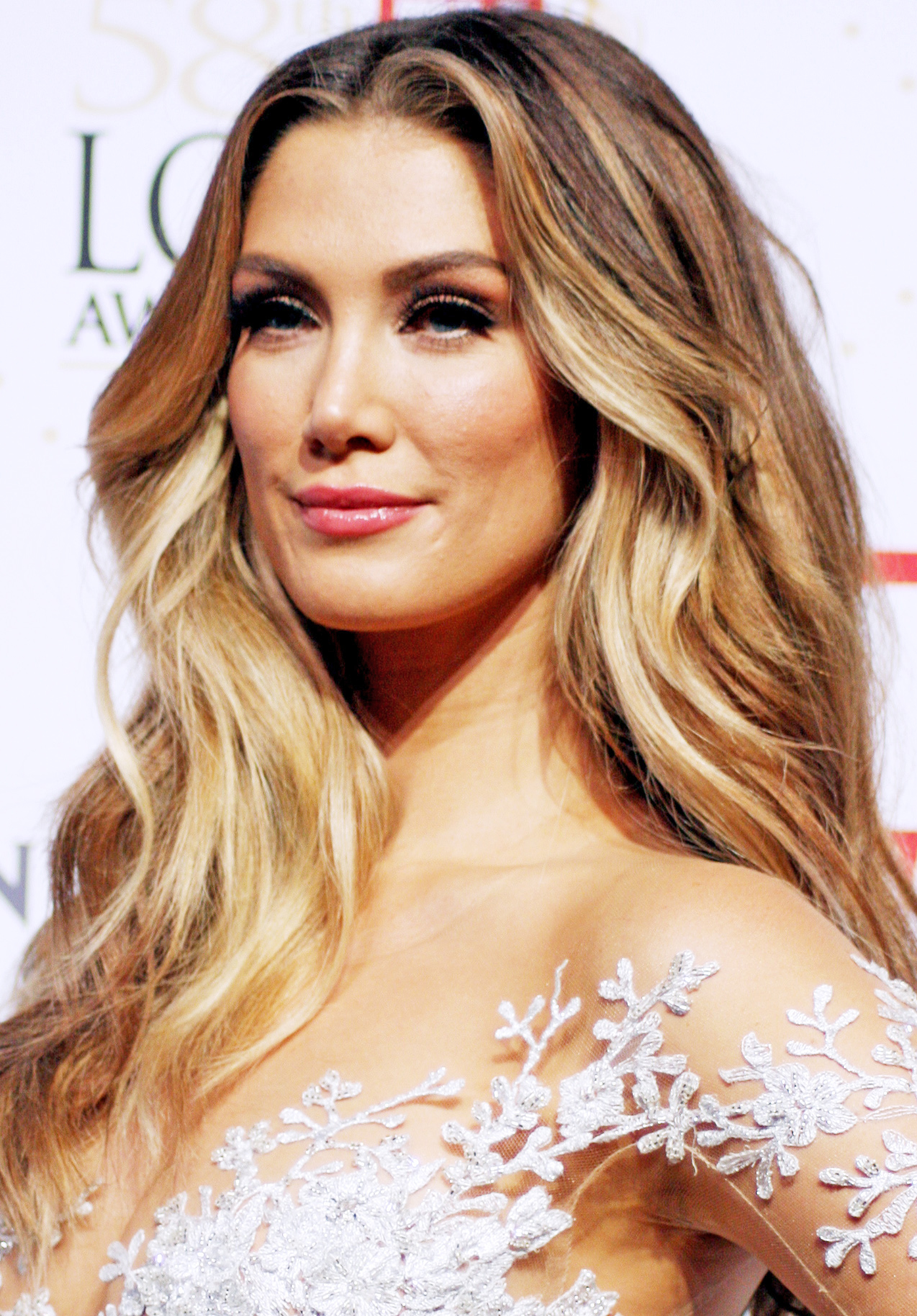
Delta Goodrem won this award for Innocent Eyes (2003).

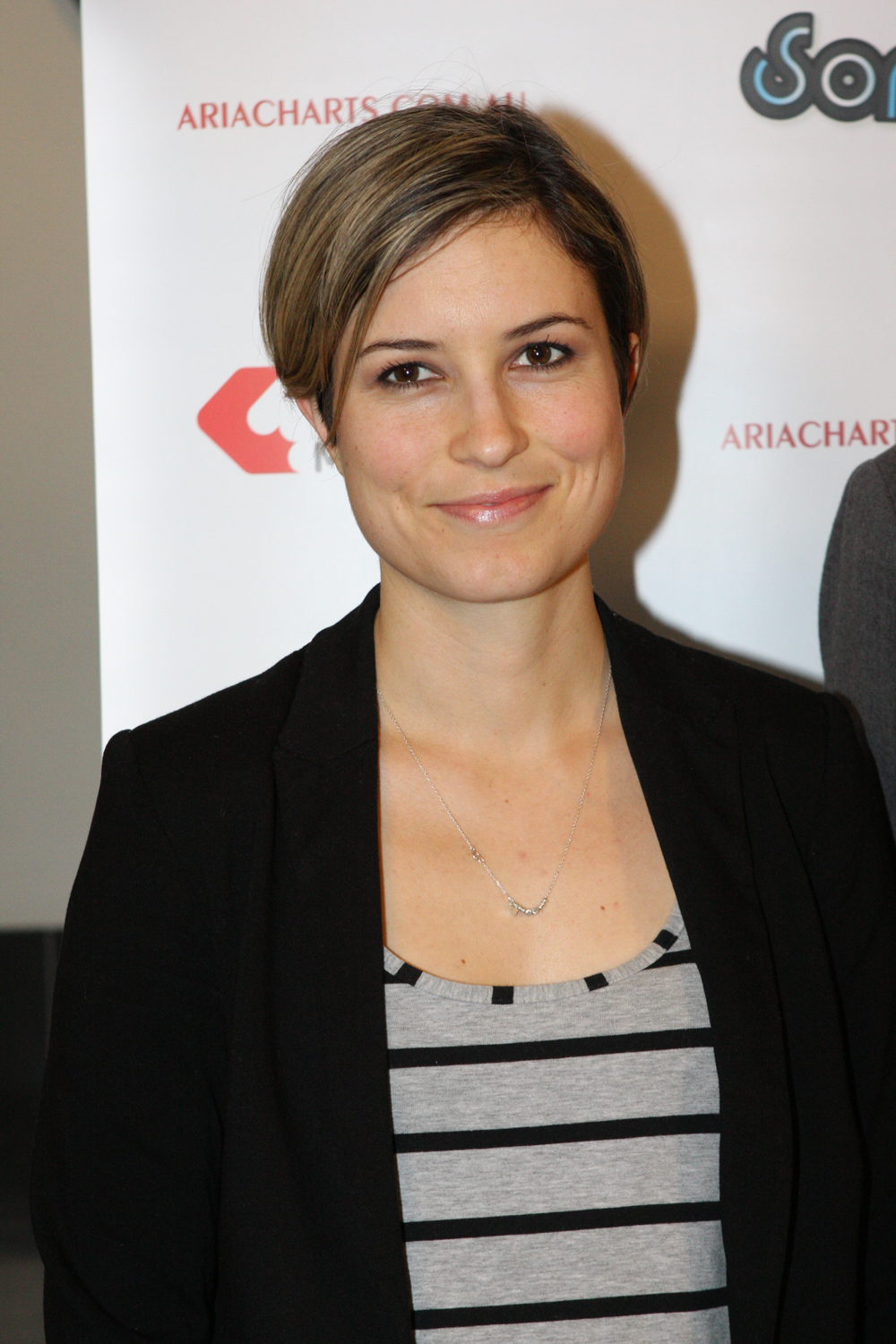
Missy Higgins won twice for The Sound of White (2004) and On a Clear Night (2007).

Clare Bowditch won in 2006 for What Was Left (2005).

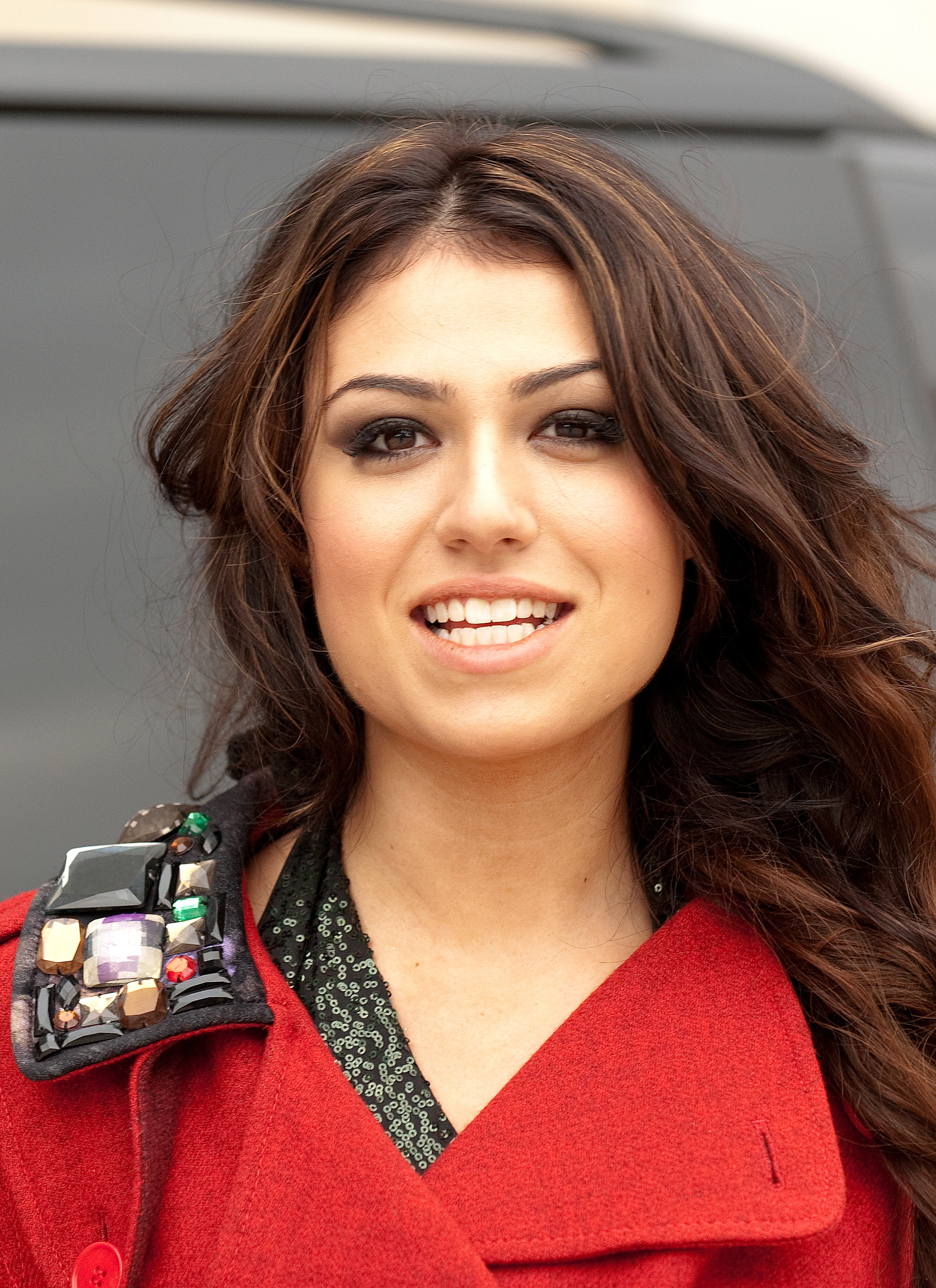
Gabriella Cilmi received the award in 2008 for Lessons to Be Learned (2008).

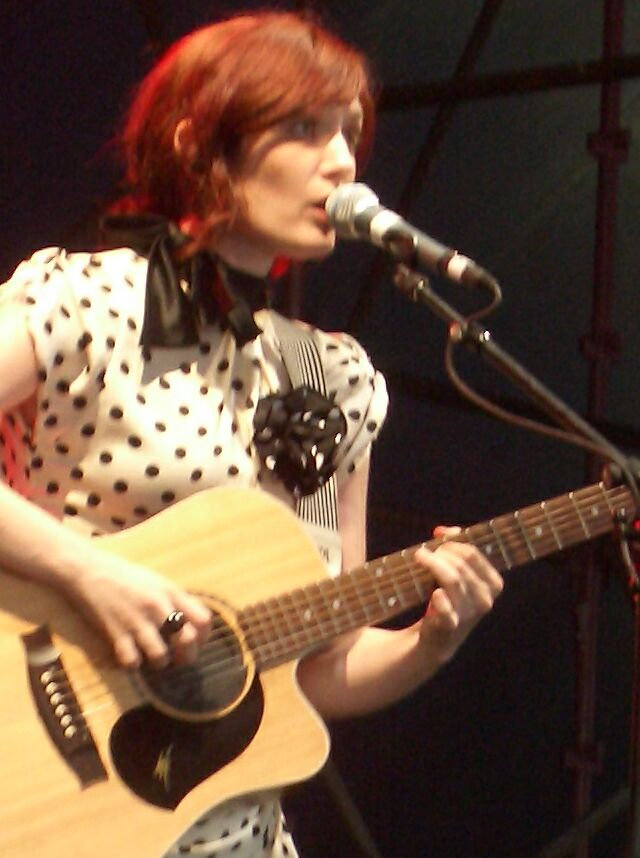
Sarah Blasko won for As Day Follows Night (2009).

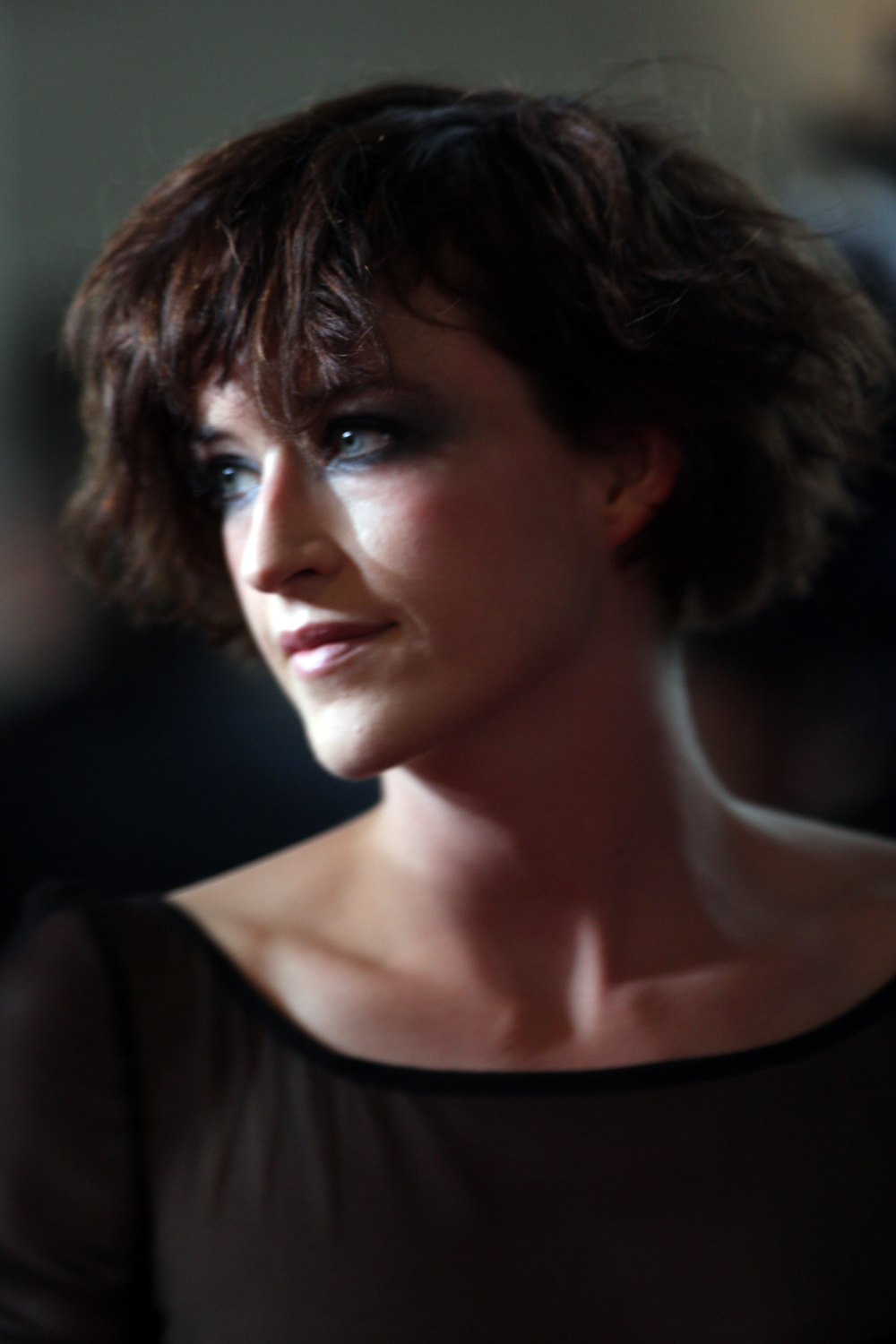
Washington won for I Believe You Liar (2010).

== Winners and nominees ==
In the following table: the years in the "Year" column are listed as per the ARIA Award ceremony; in the "Winner" column the winner for that particular year is always listed first and highlighted in a separate colour, in boldface and with a double dagger (‡); the nominees are placed alphabetically beneath the winner and are not highlighted or in boldface; the "Album/single title" column lists the title of the album or single that the artist was nominated for (no reliable sources lists the works that Kate Ceberano, Sharon O'Neill and Shona Laing were nominated for in 1988).

Table key
‡	Indicates the winner

Year	Winner	Album/single title	Ref.
**1987** (1st)
**1987** (1st)	**Jenny Morris‡**	**"You're Gonna Get Hurt"**	
**1987** (1st)	Jean Stafford	Burning Bright	
**1987** (1st)	Jo Kennedy	The Pack of Women	
**1987** (1st)	Renée Geyer	Renée Live at the Basement	
**1987** (1st)	Wendy Matthews	"Dancing Daze"	
**1988** (2nd)
**1988** (2nd)	**Jenny Morris‡**	**Body and Soul**	
**1988** (2nd)	Anne Kirkpatrick	Come Back Again	
**1988** (2nd)	Kate Ceberano	—N/a	
**1988** (2nd)	Sharon O'Neill	—N/a	
**1988** (2nd)	Shona Laing	—N/a	
**1989** (3rd)
**1989** (3rd)	**Kate Ceberano‡**	**You've Always Got the Blues**	
**1989** (3rd)	Marcia Hines	"The Lord's Prayer"	
**1989** (3rd)	Wendy Matthews	You've Always Got the Blues	
**1989** (3rd)	Kylie Minogue	Kylie	
**1989** (3rd)	Sharon O'Neill	"We're Only Human"	
**1990** (4th)
**1990** (4th)	**Kate Ceberano‡**	**Brave**	
**1990** (4th)	Robyne Dunn	Labour of Liberty	
**1990** (4th)	Gyan	Gyan	
**1990** (4th)	Kylie Minogue	Enjoy Yourself	
**1990** (4th)	Jenny Morris	Shiver	
**1991** (5th)
**1991** (5th)	**Wendy Matthews‡**	**Émigré**	
**1991** (5th)	Kate Ceberano	Like Now	
**1991** (5th)	Grace Knight	Come in Spinner	
**1991** (5th)	Jenny Morris	"Piece of My Heart"	
**1991** (5th)	Margaret Urlich	Safety in Numbers	
**1992** (6th)
**1992** (6th)	**Deborah Conway‡**	**String of Pearls**	
**1992** (6th)	Jenny Morris	Honeychild	
**1992** (6th)	Kate Ceberano	Think About It!	
**1992** (6th)	Kylie Minogue	Let's Get to It	
**1992** (6th)	Wendy Matthews	"Let's Kiss (Like Angels Do)"	
**1993** (7th)
**1993** (7th)	**Wendy Matthews‡**	**Lily**	
**1993** (7th)	Deborah Conway	"Release Me"	
**1993** (7th)	Deni Hines	"That Word (L.O.V.E.)"	
**1993** (7th)	Kate Ceberano	"I Don't Know How to Love Him"	
**1993** (7th)	Margaret Urlich	Chameleon Dreams	
**1994** (8th)
**1994** (8th)	**Wendy Matthews‡**	**"Friday's Child"**	
**1994** (8th)	Anne Kirkpatrick	Game of Love	
**1994** (8th)	Deborah Conway	Bitch Epic	
**1994** (8th)	Kate Ceberano	"You've Got a Friend"	
**1994** (8th)	Margaret Urlich	"Burnt Sienna"	
**1995** (9th)
**1995** (9th)	**Tina Arena‡**	**Don't Ask**	
**1995** (9th)	Christine Anu	Stylin Up	
**1995** (9th)	Kylie Minogue	Kylie Minogue	
**1995** (9th)	Max Sharam	A Million Year Girl	
**1995** (9th)	Merril Bainbridge	"Mouth"	
**1996** (10th)
**1996** (10th)	**Christine Anu‡**	**"Come On"**	
**1996** (10th)	Deni Hines	Imagination	
**1996** (10th)	Kate Ceberano	"Change"	
**1996** (10th)	Max Sharam	"Is It OK?/Huntinground"	
**1996** (10th)	Tina Arena	"Wasn't It Good"	
**1997** (11th)
**1997** (11th)	**Monique Brumby‡**	"**Mary**"	
**1997** (11th)	Annie Crummer	Seventh Wave	
**1997** (11th)	Deni Hines	"I'm Not in Love"	
**1997** (11th)	Nikka Costa	"Get Off My Sunshine"	
**1997** (11th)	Wendy Matthews	"Then I Walked Away"	
**1998** (12th)
**1998** (12th)	**Natalie Imbruglia‡**	**Left of the Middle**	
**1998** (12th)	Kate Ceberano	Pash	
**1998** (12th)	Kylie Minogue	Impossible Princess	
**1998** (12th)	Monique Brumby	Thylacine	
**1998** (12th)	Tina Arena	In Deep	
**1999** (13th)
**1999** (13th)	**Natalie Imbruglia‡**	**"Wishing I Was There"**	
**1999** (13th)	Kasey Chambers	The Captain	
**1999** (13th)	Kylie Minogue	"Cowboy Style"	
**1999** (13th)	Lisa Miller	As Far As Life Goes	
**1999** (13th)	Suze DeMarchi	Telelove	
**2000** (14th)
**2000** (14th)	**Kasey Chambers‡**	**"The Captain"**	
**2000** (14th)	Christine Anu	"Sunshine on a Rainy Day"	
**2000** (14th)	Diana Ah Naid	I Don't Think I'm Pregnant	
**2000** (14th)	Kylie Minogue	"Spinning Around"	
**2000** (14th)	Vanessa Amorosi	"Absolutely Everybody"	
**2001** (15th)
**2001** (15th)	**Kylie Minogue‡**	**Light Years**	
**2001** (15th)	Christine Anu	Come My Way	
**2001** (15th)	Jodi Phillis	In Dreams I Live	
**2001** (15th)	Leah Haywood	"Takin' Back What's Mine"	
**2001** (15th)	Vanessa Amorosi	The Power	
**2002** (16th)
**2002** (16th)	**Kasey Chambers‡**	**Barricades & Brickwalls**	
**2002** (16th)	Holly Valance	"Kiss Kiss"	
**2002** (16th)	Kylie Minogue	Fever	
**2002** (16th)	Lisa Miller	Car Tape	
**2002** (16th)	Natalie Imbruglia	White Lilies Island	
**2003** (17th)
**2003** (17th)	**Delta Goodrem‡**	**Innocent Eyes**	
**2003** (17th)	Amiel	Audio Out	
**2003** (17th)	Kylie Minogue	"Come into My World"	
**2003** (17th)	Renée Geyer	Tenderland	
**2003** (17th)	Sarah Blasko	Prelusive	
**2004** (18th)
**2004** (18th)	**Kasey Chambers‡**	**Wayward Angel**	
**2004** (18th)	Delta Goodrem	"Not Me, Not I"	
**2004** (18th)	Kylie Minogue	Body Language	
**2004** (18th)	Lisa Miller	Version Originale	
**2004** (18th)	Missy Higgins	"Scar"	
**2005** (19th)
**2005** (19th)	**Missy Higgins‡**	**The Sound of White**	
**2005** (19th)	Kylie Minogue	"I Believe in You"	
**2005** (19th)	Mia Dyson	Parking Lots	
**2005** (19th)	Natalie Imbruglia	Counting Down the Days	
**2005** (19th)	Sarah Blasko	The Overture & the Underscore	
**2006** (20th)
**2006** (20th)	**Clare Bowditch‡**	**What Was Left**	
**2006** (20th)	Holly Throsby	Under the Town	
**2006** (20th)	Jade MacRae	Jade MacRae	
**2006** (20th)	Jen Cloher	Dead Wood Falls	
**2006** (20th)	Kasey Chambers	"Nothing at All"	
**2007** (21st)
**2007** (21st)	**Missy Higgins‡**	**On a Clear Night**	
**2007** (21st)	Kasey Chambers	Carnival	
**2007** (21st)	Kate Miller-Heidke	Little Eve	
**2007** (21st)	Katie Noonan	"Time to Begin"	
**2007** (21st)	Sarah Blasko	What the Sea Wants, the Sea Will Have	
**2008** (22nd)
**2008** (22nd)	**Gabriella Cilmi‡**	**Lessons to Be Learned**	
**2008** (22nd)	Clare Bowditch	The Moon Looked On	
**2008** (22nd)	Holly Throsby	A Loud Call	
**2008** (22nd)	Kylie Minogue	X	
**2008** (22nd)	Missy Higgins	"Peachy"	
**2009** (23rd)
**2009** (23rd)	**Sarah Blasko‡**	**As Day Follows Night**	
**2009** (23rd)	Jessica Mauboy	Been Waiting	
**2009** (23rd)	Kate Miller-Heidke	Curiouser	
**2009** (23rd)	Ladyhawke	Ladyhawke	
**2009** (23rd)	Lisa Mitchell	Wonder	
**2010** (24th)
**2010** (24th)	**Washington‡**	**I Believe You Liar**	
**2010** (24th)	Clare Bowditch	Modern Day Addiction	
**2010** (24th)	Kylie Minogue	Aphrodite	
**2010** (24th)	Lisa Mitchell	"Oh! Hark!"	
**2010** (24th)	Sia	We Are Born	
**2011** (25th)
**2011** (25th)	**Kimbra‡**	**"Cameo Lover"**	
**2011** (25th)	Adalita	Adalita	
**2011** (25th)	Clare Bowditch	"Are You Ready Yet?"	
**2011** (25th)	Kasey Chambers	Little Bird	
**2011** (25th)	Washington	"Holy Moses"	
**2012** (26th)
**2012** (26th)	**Kimbra‡**	**Vows**	
**2012** (26th)	Jessica Mauboy	"Gotcha"	
**2012** (26th)	Lanie Lane	To the Horses	
**2012** (26th)	Missy Higgins	The Ol' Razzle Dazzle	
**2012** (26th)	Washington	Insomnia	
**2013** (27th)
**2013** (27th)	**Jessica Mauboy‡**	**"To the End of the Earth"**	
**2013** (27th)	Abbe May	Kiss My Apocalypse	
**2013** (27th)	Emma Louise	vs Head vs Heart	
**2013** (27th)	Missy Higgins	"Set Me on Fire"	
**2013** (27th)	Sarah Blasko	I Awake	
**2014** (28th)
**2014** (28th)	**Sia‡**	**1000 Forms of Fear**	
**2014** (28th)	Adalita	All Day Venus	
**2014** (28th)	Iggy Azalea	The New Classic	
**2014** (28th)	Jessica Mauboy	Beautiful	
**2014** (28th)	Kasey Chambers	Bittersweet	
**2015** (29th)
**2015** (29th)	**Courtney Barnett‡**	**Sometimes I Sit and Think, and Sometimes I Just Sit**	
**2015** (29th)	Jessica Mauboy	"Can I Get a Moment?"	
**2015** (29th)	Meg Mac	MegMac EP	
**2015** (29th)	Megan Washington	There There	
**2015** (29th)	Sia	"Elastic Heart"	
**2016** (30th)
**2016** (30th)	**Sia‡**	**This Is Acting**	
**2016** (30th)	Delta Goodrem	Wings of the Wild	
**2016** (30th)	Jessica Mauboy	"This Ain't Love"	
**2016** (30th)	Montaigne	Glorious Heights	
**2016** (30th)	Sarah Blasko	Eternal Return	
**2017** (31st)
**2017** (31st)	**Sia‡**	**"The Greatest"** (featuring Kendrick Lamar)	
**2017** (31st)	Amy Shark	Night Thinker	
**2017** (31st)	Jessica Mauboy	The Secret Daughter (Songs from the Original TV Series)	
**2017** (31st)	Julia Jacklin	Don't Let the Kids Win	
**2017** (31st)	Meg Mac	Low Blows	
**2018** (32nd)
**2018** (32nd)	**Amy Shark‡**	**Love Monster**	
**2018** (32nd)	Alison Wonderland	Awake	
**2018** (32nd)	Courtney Barnett	Tell Me How You Really Feel	
**2018** (32nd)	Sia	"Flames"	
**2018** (32nd)	Tash Sultana	Flow State	
**2019** (33rd)
**2019** (33rd)	**Tones and I‡**	**"Dance Monkey"**	
**2019** (33rd)	Amy Shark	"Mess Her Up"	
**2019** (33rd)	Jessica Mauboy	"Little Things"	
**2019** (33rd)	Julia Jacklin	Crushing	
**2019** (33rd)	Thelma Plum	Better in Blak	
**2020** (34th)
**2020** (34th)	**Sampa the Great‡**	**The Return**	
**2020** (34th)	Amy Shark	"Everybody Rise"	
**2020** (34th)	Miiesha	Nyaaringu	
**2020** (34th)	Sia	"Together"	
**2020** (34th)	Tones and I	"Bad Child"/"Can't Be Happy All the Time"	

== Multiple wins and nominations ==
The following individuals received two or more Best Female Artist awards:

Wins	Artist
3	Kasey Chambers
3	Wendy Matthews
3	Sia
2	Kate Ceberano
2	Missy Higgins
2	Natalie Imbruglia
2	Kimbra
2	Jenny Morris

The following individuals received two or more Best Female Artist nominations:

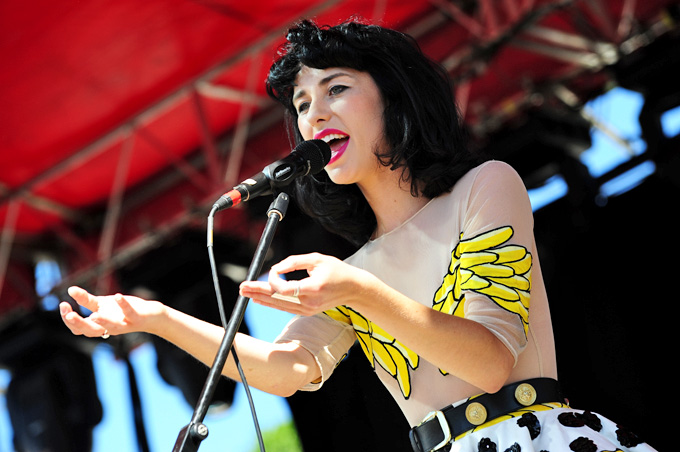
New Zealand-born artist, Kimbra won twice for "Cameo Lover" (2011) and Vows (2012).

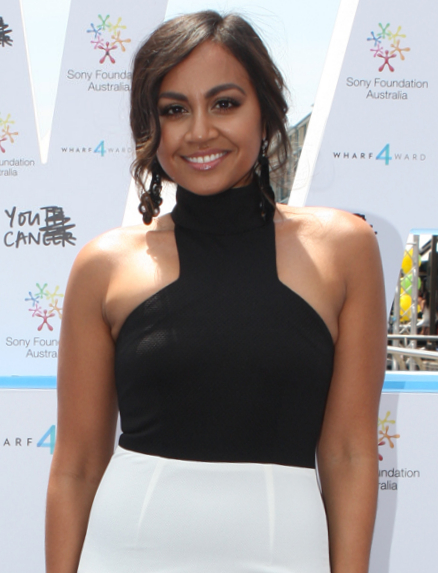
Jessica Mauboy received the award for "To the End of the Earth" (2013).

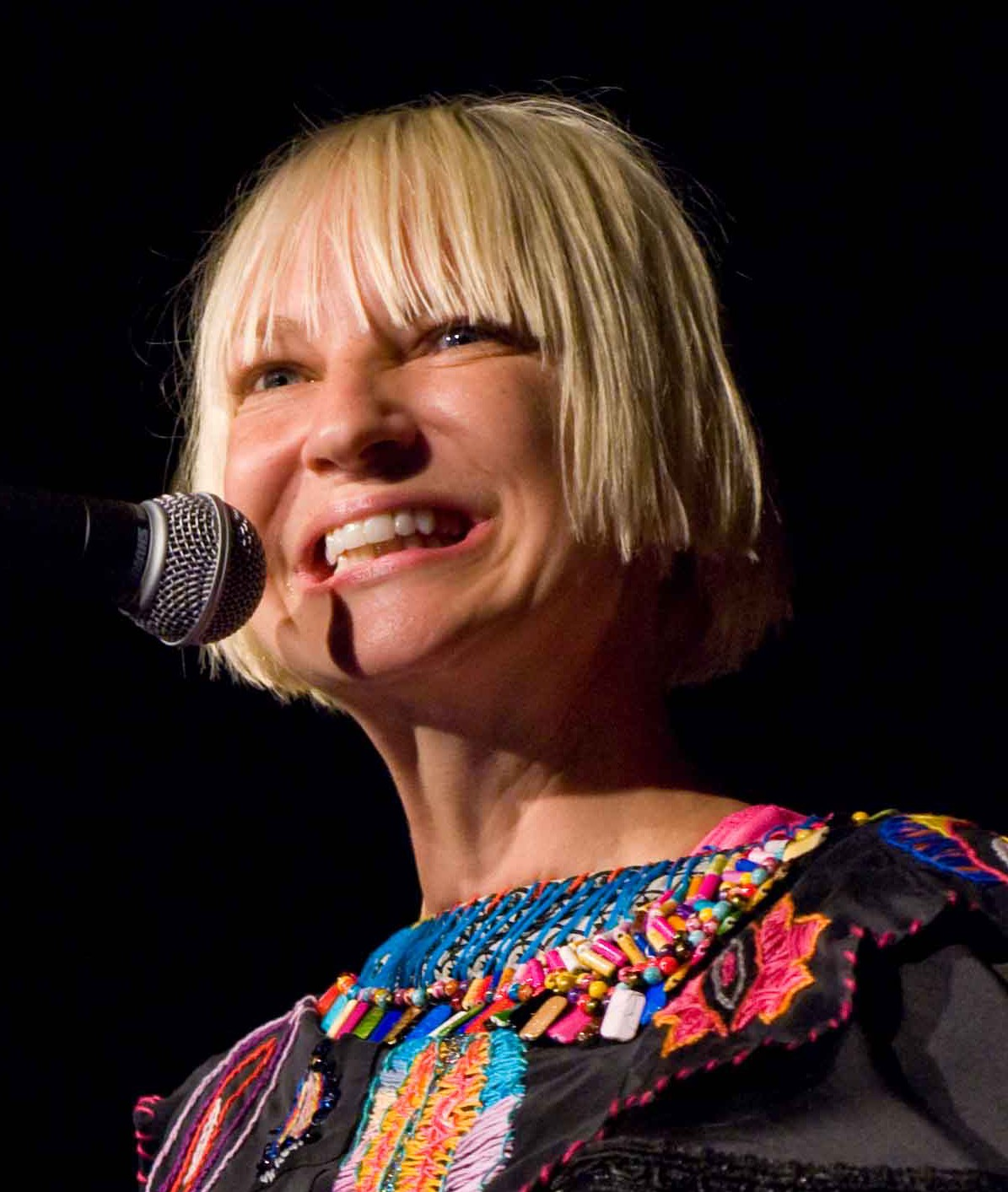
Sia has received the award twice for 1000 Forms of Fear (2014) and This Is Acting (2016).

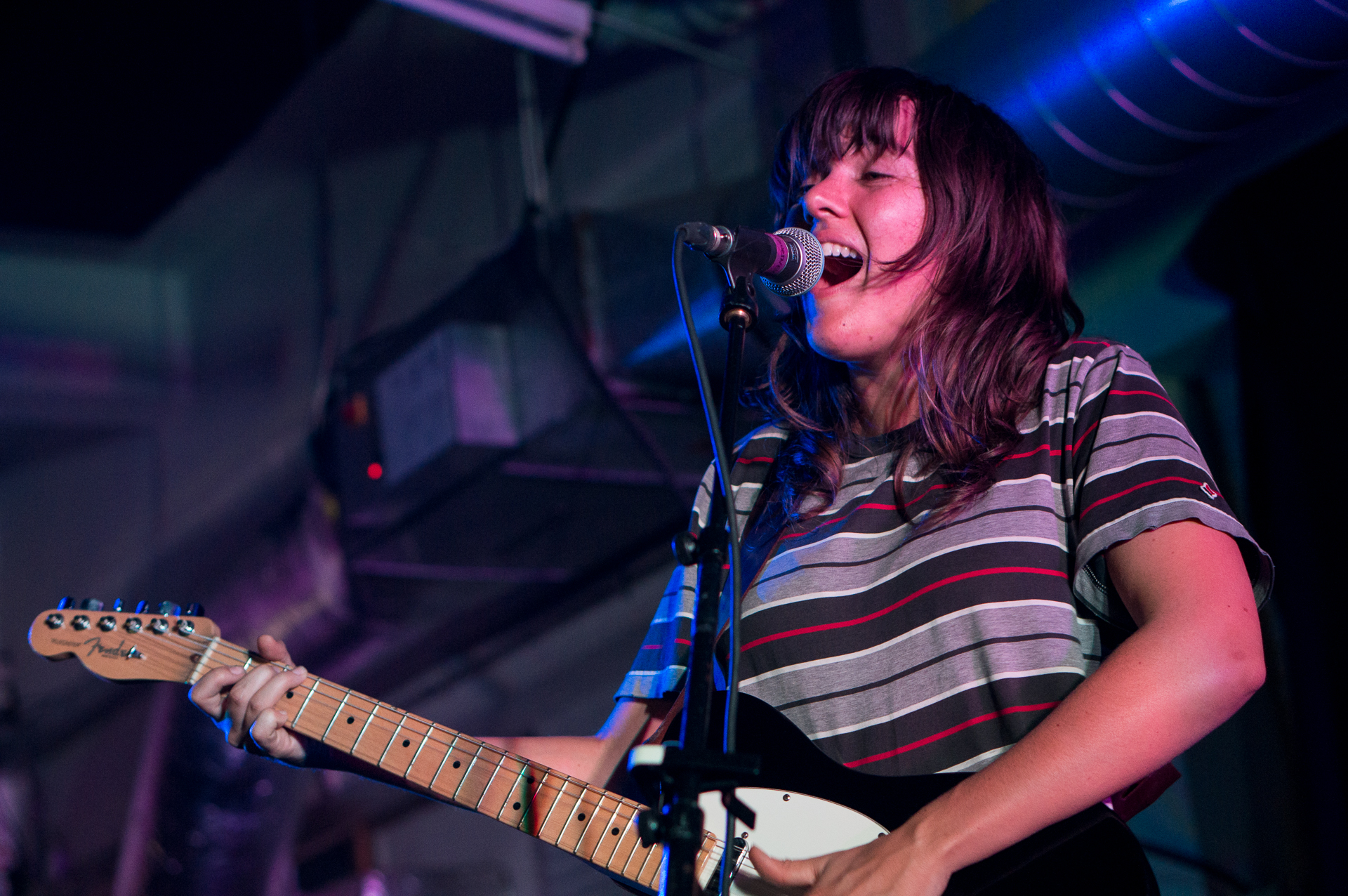
Courtney Barnett won in 2015 for Sometimes I Sit and Think, and Sometimes I Just Sit.

Nominations	Artist
14	Kylie Minogue
9	Kate Ceberano
8	Kasey Chambers
8	Jessica Mauboy
7	Wendy Matthews
7	Sia
6	Sarah Blasko
6	Missy Higgins
5	Jenny Morris
4	Christine Anu
4	Clare Bowditch
4	Natalie Imbruglia
4	Amy Shark
4	Megan Washington
3	Tina Arena
3	Deborah Conway
3	Delta Goodrem
3	Deni Hines
3	Lisa Miller
3	Margaret Urlich
2	Adalita
2	Vanessa Amorosi
2	Courtney Barnett
2	Monique Brumby
2	Renée Geyer
2	Kimbra
2	Anne Kirkpatrick
2	Meg Mac
2	Kate Miller-Heidke
2	Lisa Mitchell
2	Sharon O'Neill
2	Max Sharam
2	Julia Jacklin
2	Holly Throsby
2	Tones and I

== See also ==
- List of music awards honoring women
