= Depth of Field (disambiguation) =

Depth of field can refer to:

- Depth of field, in optics, the distance about the plane of focus (POF) where objects appear acceptably sharp in an image
- Depth of Field (album), album by Sarah Blasko (2018)
- Depth of Field, record label founded in 1997 by Bobby Previte
- Depth of Field, film production company founded by Paul Weitz and Chris Weitz
