= Robert F. Cranny =

- Born: Robert Francis Cranny; 2 July 1981 (age 45); Liverpool, England
- Genres: Rock and roll, pop, indie rock
- Occupations: Guitarist, keyboardist, songwriter, record producer
- Instruments: Guitar, keyboards
- Years active: 2002–present

Robert Francis Cranny (born 2 July 1981) is an English-born Australian musician, songwriter and record producer based in Sydney.

== Career ==
=== Peachfield ===
In 2019, Cranny began releasing music with new alt-Australiana six-piece, Peachfield. The band is described by Beat magazine as, "...a delicate blend of emotive lyrics, drifting piano, colourful narratives and soaring vocals".

Its debut EP Monuments of Debris was released in November 2020. The work is described by Beat magazine as, "...a sweeping exploration of Cranny’s own narratives of young Australian lives, set in urban, coastal and rural cities and towns."

=== Collaboration with Sarah Blasko ===
Robert F. Cranny co-wrote and co-produced the first two albums of Sydney musician, Sarah Blasko, The Overture & the Underscore (2004) and What The Sea Wants, The Sea Will Have (2006), both of which were certified platinum.

The Overture & the Underscore was recorded in Hollywood, California with engineer Wally Gagel (Eels, Old 97s, Folk Implosion) and session drummer Joey Waronker (Beck, The Smashing Pumpkins).

What The Sea Wants, The Sea Will Have was produced by Blasko, Cranny and Jim Moginie of Midnight Oil-fame. It was recorded in Neil Finn's Roundhead Studios in Auckland, New Zealand. The album won an ARIA award in 2007 for Best Pop Release.

Cranny co-wrote all tracks on both albums, with the exception of Beautiful Secrets. He is the sole writer of the song Perfect Now which has appeared in the television program, One Tree Hill.

On What The Sea Wants, The Sea Will Have, Cranny arranged and conducted a chamber ensemble as well as a Maori choir. In 2007, Sarah Blasko undertook a 12-date national tour accompanied by a five-piece chamber section. Cranny again scored the orchestral instruments. Songs from The Overture & the Underscore, which were never originally arranged for orchestral instruments, were also given this treatment.

=== Other production and musical work ===
In 2015, Cranny joined seminal Melbourne indie-rock band, Gersey, to write and record the band's fourth LP, "What You Kill". Cranny co-wrote the majority of tracks, played a CP-70 piano and was given a specific production credit for his work on the expansive "There Are Things That You And I Can Never Be".

In 2011, Cranny co-produced the debut album by Ben Salter, "The Cat". It was produced by Gareth Liddiard, Robert F. Cranny & Ben Salter at Liddiard's rural property in Myrtleford, Victoria. Liddiard's own band, The Drones had previously recorded the album Havilah at the property. Cranny made songwriting contributions to two album tracks, and personally wrote the song, "Know Your Strength" for the album.

In 2010, Cranny played an 11-date Australian tour as a keyboard player in Gersey, supporting US band, Pavement.

In 2009, he played keyboards for US indie-rock musician Spiral Stairs, including an appearance at the 2009 Sydney Laneway Festival.

In 2008, Cranny co-produced three tracks with Leonardo's Bride vocalist, Abby Dobson, for her debut solo album "Rise Up", including the single, "Horses".

Cranny has also performed and recorded with other artists such as Ben Salter, 78 Saab, Sianna Lee, The Maladies, The C-Minus Project, Darren Hanlon, Soap Star Joe, Gaslight Radio & Magic Lunchbox.

== Songs featured in television series ==
Robert F Cranny composed original songs that were used in the following TV series:

Year	Song	Artist	Composer	TV series	Season	Episode	Ref.
2005	"Always Worth It"	Sarah Blasko	Robert F Cranny & Sarah Blasko	Six Feet Under	5	12	
2006	"Perfect Now"	Sarah Blasko	Robert F Cranny	One Tree Hill	3	18	
2015	"Endlessness"	Gersey	Jackson/Cranny/Tulen/Bradie/Davis	The Royals	2	2	
2015	"It Means Nothing"	Gersey	Jackson/Cranny/Tulen/Bradie/Davis	The Royals	2	7	

== Record label ==
Along with Sarah Kelly from theredsunband, Robert F. Cranny owned and operated Enchanted Recordings, an independent record label based in Sydney, Australia, which was active between 2006 and 2010.

Enchanted Recordings was distributed nationally by Shock Records and employed the resources of Nonzero Records & Rice Is Nice. The label released the following catalogue:

=== Albums ===
- The Shiralee - theredsunband, June 2008, Enchanted Recordings
- Phoenix Propeller – Sianna Lee, March 2010, Enchanted Recordings

=== EPs ===
- Like An Arrow – theredsunband, November 2007, Enchanted Recordings

=== Singles ===
- The Eagle – theredsunband, August 2008, Enchanted Recordings

== Awards and recognition ==
"The Cat" by Ben Salter

- Won the Queensland Music Award for Album of the Year in 2012
- "West End Girls" listed at #28 on The Courier Mail's "Top 50 Queensland Songs"

"What The Sea Wants, The Sea Will Have" by Sarah Blasko

- Awarded a platinum sales accreditation in Australia
- Won an ARIA Award for Best Pop Release in 2007
- "{Explain}" (#79) and "Always on this Line" (#58) reached Triple J's Hottest 100 for 2006

"The Overture & the Underscore" by Sarah Blasko

- Awarded a platinum sales accreditation in Australia
- "Don't U Eva" (#27) reached Triple J's Hottest 100 for 2004
- Named the 10th Greatest Australian Album of All Time by Triple J Music Director, Richard Kingsmill

== Credits ==
=== Production credits ===
- Don't U Eva single – Sarah Blasko (2004) – produced by Sarah Blasko and Robert F Cranny
- The Overture & The Underscore – Sarah Blasko (2004) - produced by Sarah Blasko and Robert F Cranny
- She Will Have Her Way: The Songs of Neil & Tim Finn – Sarah Blasko (2005) – Don't Dream It's Over produced by Sarah Blasko and Robert F Cranny
- What The Sea Wants, The Sea Will Have - Sarah Blasko (2006) – produced by Sarah Blasko, Robert F Cranny and Jim Moginie
- Rise Up – Abby Dobson (2008) – three tracks produced by Robert F Cranny and Abby Dobson
- Horses single Abby Dobson (2009) – produced by Robert F Cranny and Abby Dobson
- Phoenix Propeller – Sianna Lee (2010) – Mercenary in Me produced by Robert F Cranny
- The Cat - Ben Salter (2011) – produced by Robert F Cranny, Gareth Liddiard & Ben Salter
- King Me - Love Parade (2013) – produced by Robert F Cranny
- Where The Ocean Starts EP - Katie Whyte (2013) - produced by Robert F Cranny
- What You Kill - Gersey (2016) - produced by Tim Whitten & Gersey
- "Helicopters To Find You" - Peachfield (2019) - produced by Robert F Cranny
- Monuments of Debris - Peachfield (2020) - produced by Robert F Cranny

=== Songwriting credits ===
- Don't U Eva single – Sarah Blasko (2004) – written by Sarah Blasko and Robert F Cranny
- The Overture & The Underscore – Sarah Blasko (2004) all tracks written by Sarah Blasko and Robert F Cranny, except "Beautiful Secrets" by Sarah Blasko & "Perfect Now" by Robert F Cranny.
- What The Sea Wants, The Sea Will Have (2006) – all tracks written by Sarah Blasko and Robert F Cranny
- Phoenix Propeller – Sianna Lee (2010) – You Are The Sea written by Sianna Lee and Robert F Cranny
- The Cat - Ben Salter (2011) – Know Your Strength written by Robert F Cranny, The Cat written by Ben Salter, Robert F Cranny & Gareth Liddiard
- Monuments of Debris - Peachfield (2020) - all tracks written by Robert F Cranny

=== Other recording credits ===
- Picture a Hum, Can't Hear a Sound – 78 Saab (2000) – piano, organ, synth
- Orange Syringe – Tom Morgan (2013) - Casio MT70, Hammond Organ
- "What You Kill" - Gersey (2016) - CP70, Roland JUNO, guitar, vocals, production
