= Don't U Eva =

Single by Sarah Blasko

from the album The Overture & the Underscore
- Released: September 2004
- Recorded: Bliss Recording Studios, L.A. April - June 2004
- Genre: Alternative
- Length: 15:07
- Label: Dew Process UMA DEW90142
- Songwriters: Sarah Blasko & Robert F Cranny
- Producers: Wally Gagel, Sarah Blasko & Robert F Cranny

Sarah Blasko singles chronology
| "Don't U Eva" (2004) | "Flame Trees" (2006) |

"Don't U Eva" is a song by Australian singer Sarah Blasko. It was released in September 2004 as the debut single from her debut studio album The Overture & the Underscore.

In Australia, the song was ranked #27 on Triple J's Hottest 100 of 2004.

It contained an exclusive original composition "Fall Down", a frequent appearance in Sarah's live shows, and "Into the Great Wide Open", a Tom Petty and the Heartbreakers cover originally found on the Heartbreaker's 1991 album of the same name.

Ben Lee makes a cameo appearance as the "A&R man" in "Into the Great Wide Open". He, Nadav & Edo Khan & Old Man River also sing backing vocals on this track.

It received a very limited release of around 1000 copies before being deleted.

== Track listing ==
1. "Don't U Eva" (edit) - 3:53
2. "All Coming Back" - 3:15
3. "Fall Down" - 4:06
4. "Into the Great Wide Open" - 3:51
- All tracks written by Sarah Blasko & Robert F Cranny except track 4 written by Tom Petty and Jeff Lynne.
