= Ernest Ellis (singer) =

Australian musician

- Born: Ernest Ellis
- Origin: Australia
- Genres: Pop
- Occupations: Singer; songwriter; musician
- Instruments: Vocals; piano
- Years active: 2009–present
- Website: www.ernestellis.com

Ernest Ellis is an Australian singer-songwriter. His fourth album, The Pariah, was written over four years after his move to New York City.

== Discography ==
=== Albums ===
List of albums, with selected details
| Title | Details |
|---|---|
| Hunting | Released: June 2010; Format: CD, digital; Label: Dew Process (DEW9000268) |
| Kings Canyon (as Ernest Ellis & The Panamas) | Released: 2011; Format: LP; Label: Dew Process |
| Cold Desire | Released: 2014; Format: CD, digital; Label: Spunk (URA452) |
| Be the Pariah | Released: August 2020; Format: CD, digital; Label: Heroism |

=== Charting singles ===
List of singles, with selected chart positions
| Title | Year | Peak chart positions | Album |
| Title | Year | AUS | Album |
|---|---|---|---|
| "Loveless" | 2010 | 72 | Hunting |
