= Luxurious (Sarah Blasko song) =

Single by Sarah Blasko

from the album Eternal Return
- Released: 30 October 2015
- Genre: Pop, alternative
- Length: 4:51
- Label: EMI
- Songwriters: Sarah Blasko; Ben Fletcher; David Hunt
- Producer: Burke Reid

Sarah Blasko singles chronology
"I'd Be Lost" / "Only One" (2015)	"Luxurious" (2015)	"I Wanna be Your Man" (2015)

Music video
- "Luxurious" on YouTube

"Luxurious" is a song by Australian singer-songwriter Sarah Blasko from her fifth studio album Eternal Return.

== Background and composition ==
"Luxurious" was written by Blasko with close collaborators Ben Fletcher and David Hunt. It was recorded at The Grove Studios in Sydney under the supervision of Australian-based producer Burke Reid.

Described by Blasko as "the most delicate song on the record", "Luxurious" is a torch song notable for being the only track off Eternal Return to not feature the album's distinct retro-futuristic sound.

I remember how still the room became when we stumbled upon it. It felt like something special then and it does now too.

The track is built around a bass progression fed through a Guyatone Tube Tremolo pedal while Blasko's vocals were recorded with a Neumann U47. Like the rest of the tracks on Eternal Return, lead vocals for the song were overdubbed late during Blasko's first pregnancy which made singing difficult.

== Music video ==
Two music videos were filmed for "Luxurious". A day prior to its digital release, a video by filmmaker Mike Daly was uploaded to Blasko's VEVO account. It features visuals by Daly which originally accompanied Blasko's performance at Sydney Opera House's Graphic Festival. In November 2016, Blasko uploaded another video for the song onto her YouTube account. The latest version, directed by Australian photographer Wilk, depicted her singing on the edge of a bed while surrounded by animated tulips.

== Track listing ==
1. "Luxurious" (Blasko, Fletcher, Hunt)
