= Jack Colwell =

Australian singer-songwriter (1989–2024)

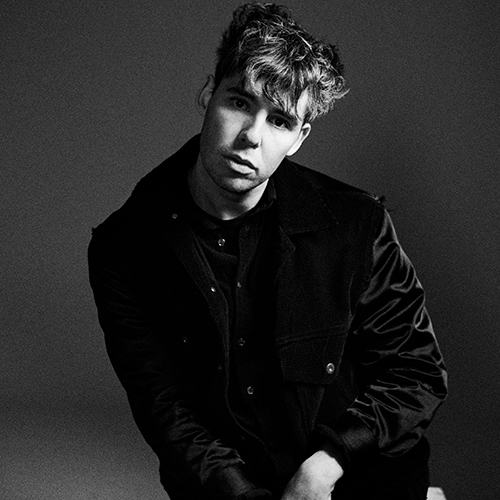
- Promotional photo of Colwell, 2020

Background information
- Born: 26 October 1989
- Died: 3 October 2024 (aged 34)
- Occupation: Singer-songwriter
- Instruments: Piano, vocals, guitar
- Years active: 2012–2024
- Website: https://jackcolwell.com.au

Jack Colwell (26 October 1989 – 3 October 2024) was an Australian singer-songwriter.

== Early life ==
Colwell attended the Conservatorium High School at the Sydney Conservatorium of Music.

Prior to launching his solo career, Colwell worked behind the scenes in the Australian music industry, assisting Karen O with her performance of "Stop The Virgens" at the Sydney Opera House in 2012 and arranging vocals for Architecture in Helsinki. He also had a band called Jack Colwell & The Owls.

== Career ==
Colwell attracted attention in August 2015 when Rolling Stone Australia premiered the video for his single "Don't Cry Those Tears".

The song topped AMRAP's Metro radio chart for four consecutive weeks but programmers at Triple J told Colwell, who was 25 years old at the time, that "Don't Cry Those Tears" sounded 'too old' to be played on the station.

In late August 2015, he self-released his first solo EP, Only When Flooded Could I Let Go.

In September 2015, Colwell appeared at Newtown Social Club as part of Rolling Stone's "Live Lodge" concert series. In November 2015, ARIA-winning singer-songwriter Sarah Blasko announced that Colwell would be the main support act on her 2016 Australian tour.

In August 2016, Colwell released When The World Explodes, an EP featuring remixes of songs from Only When Flooded... by HEALTH, Fennesz, Roly Porter, Ash Koosha, Rabit and Marcus Whale.

In October 2016, Colwell played a sold-out hometown show at the Sydney Opera House with a string ensemble.

=== Work with Patrick Wolf ===
In 2018, Colwell accompanied cult singer-songwriter and former Burberry model Patrick Wolf at Wolf's career-spanning Australian comeback concert. The pair reunited in January 2020 for a sold-out run of Wolf shows in London, with Colwell contributing arrangements and multi-instrumental accompaniment.

=== Swandream ===
Colwell self-released his debut album, Swandream, in 2020.

Produced by Sarah Blasko, Swandream was acclaimed by critics: NME declared it "an utterly visceral listen with immediate impact" while The Guardian said "Colwell and Blasko have built a full-immersion tale that is both theatrical and real."

BrooklynVegan called Swandream "a record loaded with lush, moody ballads and soaring anthems" and Junkee crowned it "the fieriest and most beautiful album of the year so far".

Swandream ranked #5 on NME's '25 Best Australian Albums of 2020' list.

Prior to the album's release, Colwell shared a collaboration with Owen Pallett, "I Will Not Change My Ways". The song was recorded in one take while Colwell was in Pallett's native Toronto. An alternative version appeared on Swandream.

A track from the album, "In My Dreams", was remixed by Robin Guthrie of the Cocteau Twins. Guthrie's version appeared alongside remixes by Joel Amey of Wolf Alice and Australian musicians Rainbow Chan and Marcus Whale on the EP Swanlux.

=== Literary work ===
Colwell wrote essays for The Guardian, Kill Your Darlings and others, and delivered talks at the National Young Writers' Festival and the Emerging Writers' Festival.

== Advocacy ==
In November 2016, Colwell released the fundraising single No Mercy in honour of deceased Australian Indigenous teenager Tyrone Unsworth.

In September 2017, Colwell programmed and performed at Unity: the Equality Campaign concert at the Enmore Theatre in Sydney with Sarah Blasko, Killing Heidi, The Jezabels and others. Proceeds from the event went to Australian Marriage Equality, a registered charity advocating for the legalisation of same-sex marriage in Australia.

== Personal life and death ==
Colwell was born three months prematurely on 26 October 1989.

Colwell was gay; after his death, his friend Gen Fricker described him as "out and flamboyant at 14."

Colwell was a survivor of childhood domestic abuse, as described in the Swandream song "The Sound of Music." He wrote that the events "destroyed the innocence of my childhood and drained the sense of fantasy and wonder from my youth."

Colwell was a noted Tori Amos fan. In 2017, he told Double J: "What I love about Tori is that she made the piano cool."

In his 2015 Kill Your Darlings essay Ears with Feet: Life Among the Tori Amos Super Fans he wrote: "I had allowed her music to save my life during a time when I saw no way out. When you yourself are a teenager struggling with your sexuality, who was also raped by a stranger, listening to the work of Tori Amos can be pretty powerful stuff."

Colwell died by suicide on 3 October 2024 at the age of 34.
