= All I Want (Sarah Blasko song) =

Single by Sarah Blasko

from the album As Day Follows Night
- Released: May 2009
- Length: 3:53
- Label: Dew Process
- Songwriter: Sarah Blasko
- Producer: Björn Yttling

Sarah Blasko singles chronology
"Always on This Line" (2006)	"All I Want" (2009)	"We Won't Run" (2009)

"All I Want" is a song by Australian singer/songwriter Sarah Blasko. The song was released in May 2009 as the lead single from her third studio album As Day Follows Night. The song peaked at number 64 on the ARIA Chart.

The song placed at number 29 on the Triple J Hottest 100, 2009.

At the 2009 ARIA Music Awards, the Head Pictures, Damon Escott, Stephen Lance directed video was nominated for Best Video.

At the APRA Music Awards of 2010, the song was nominated for Song of the Year.

== Track listing ==
Digital download and streaming
No.	Title	Length
1.	"All I Want"

== Charts ==
Chart (2009)	Peak position
Australia (ARIA)	64

== Certifications ==
Region	Certification	Certified units/sales
Australia (ARIA)	Gold	35,000^{‡}
^{‡} Sales+streaming figures based on certification alone.
