= We Won't Run (Sarah Blasko song) =

Single by Sarah Blasko

from the album As Day Follows Night
- Released: August 2009
- Length: 4:00
- Label: Dew Process
- Songwriter: Sarah Blasko
- Producer: Björn Yttling

Sarah Blasko singles chronology
"All I Want" (2009)	"We Won't Run" (2009)	"Bird on a Wire" (2010)

"We Won't Run" is a song by Australian singer/songwriter Sarah Blasko. The song was released in August 2009 as the second single from her third studio album As Day Follows Night. The song peaked at number 44 on the ARIA Chart.

The song placed at number 28 on the Triple J Hottest 100, 2009.

At the APRA Music Awards of 2010, the song was shortlisted for Song of the Year.

The single was released in the United Kingdom on 2 March 2010.

== Reception ==
Music-News gave it 3/5 saying "Quite gentle acoustic sounds and a voice to die for. 'We Won't Run' is a very pleasant spring like track with great melody, highlighting Sarah's voice perfectly."

== Track listing ==
Digital download and streaming
No.	Title	Length
1.	"We Won't Run"	4:00

== Charts ==
Chart (2009)	Peak position
Australia (ARIA)	44

== Certifications ==
Region	Certification	Certified units/sales
Australia (ARIA)	Platinum	70,000^{‡}
^{‡} Sales+streaming figures based on certification alone.
