= I'd Be Lost / Only One =

"I'd Be Lost" / "Only One"

Single by Sarah Blasko

from the album Eternal Return
- Released: 18 September 2015
- Genre: Pop, alternative
- Length: 4:30 (I'd Be Lost); 4:16 (Only One)
- Label: EMI
- Songwriters: Sarah Blasko; Ben Fletcher; David Hunt; Nick Wales
- Producer: Burke Reid

Sarah Blasko singles chronology
"Fool" (2015)	"I'd Be Lost" / "Only One" (2015)	"Luxurious" (2015)

"I'd Be Lost" and "Only One" are two songs recorded by Australian singer-songwriter Sarah Blasko for her fifth studio album Eternal Return. Both songs premiered on 13 September 2015 during Richard Kingsmill's new music segment on Triple J and were released as a double A-side on 18 September 2015.

== Music video ==
On 5 November 2015, the music videos for "I'd Be Lost" and "Only One" were uploaded to Blasko's VEVO channel. "I'd Be Lost" features the singer in front of a backdrop of incoming traffic, ending with her being engulfed in light. "Only One" follows Blasko as she makes her way alone through a carpark and starts dancing.

== Track listing ==
1. "I'd Be Lost" (Blasko, Fletcher, Hunt)
2. "Only One" (Blasko, Wales)

== Charts ==
Chart (2015)	Peak position
Australia (ARIA)	177
