= Prelusive =

EP by Sarah Blasko
- Released: September 2002
- Studio: Satellite Studios, Sydney
- Genre: Alternative
- Length: 26:19
- Label: Independent release
- Producer: Sarah Blasko & Nicholas Schneider

Sarah Blasko chronology
Prelusive (2002)	The Overture & the Underscore (2004)

Prelusive is the 2002 independent debut EP by Australian singer–songwriter Sarah Blasko.

A video was made for "Your Way", and the song received a great deal of airplay on youth radio station Triple J.

The EP is called 'Prelusive' "because that means introductory, from the word 'Prelude', which is a musical term meaning a short, independent composition" said Blasko in a 2003 interview. "And so I thought that word really fit because [the EP] is relatively short- only six songs, and it’s independent, and it’s a composition, or a number of compositions."

The EP was re-released by Sarah's new label Dew Process (UMA DEW90062) in March 2003.

== Track listing ==
1. "Your Way" – 4:04
2. "Will You Ever Know" – 3:45
3. "Be Tonight" – 4:59
4. "Sweet Surrender" – 4:24
5. "Follow The Sun" – 4:16
6. "New Religion" – 4:51
- Tracks 1 & 2 written by Sarah Blasko & Nicholas Schneider, 3 & 6 written by Sarah Blasko and tracks 4 & 5 written by Sarah Blasko and Hugh Wilson.

== Studio crew ==
- Sarah Blasko – vox, guitar, keyboards
- Nicholas Schneider – guitar, keyboards, programming, flute
- Willem New – bass
- Jeff De Araujo – drums
- Hugh Wilson – keyboards, guitar
- Mixed by Steve Francis, mastered by Adam McElnea.
