= The Overture & the Underscore =

Studio album by Sarah Blasko
- Released: October 2004
- Recorded: Bliss Recording Studios, L.A. April - June 2004
- Genre: Alternative
- Length: 49:08
- Label: Dew Process UMA DEW90132
- Producers: Wally Gagel, Sarah Blasko & Robert F Cranny

Sarah Blasko chronology
Prelusive EP (2002)	The Overture & the Underscore (2004)	What the Sea Wants, the Sea Will Have (2006)

Singles from The Overture & the Underscore
- 1. "Don't U Eva" Released: September 2004

The Overture & the Underscore is the debut studio album released by Australian singer-songwriter Sarah Blasko in October 2004.

Blasko said "Essentially I wanted there to be something really classic about the album. The kind of debut albums I like are those that don't try and do too much too soon, that point towards a number of possible directions, and that give the songs some room to move. It was really important to me that my voice and the songs had some character and that there was an intimacy to them. We tried to achieve this by using little or no effect on the voice and not going too far with overdubs."

== Reception ==
Professional ratings
Review scores
Source	Rating
AAP	09/06/05
The Courier-Mail	4/5 stars
The Daily Telegraph	4.5/5 stars
The Sydney Morning Herald	08/10/04

Triple J music director Richard Kingsmill rated it ninth on his list of favourite 2004 albums. In 2011, he named it the 10th Greatest Australian Album Of All Time.

== Track list ==
1. "All Coming Back" – 3:15
2. "Beautiful Secrets" – 3:24
3. "Always Worth It" – 3:46
4. "At Your Best" – 3:36
5. "Don't U Eva" – 4:19
6. "Counting Sheep" – 4:21
7. "Perfect Now" – 3:33
8. "Sweet November" – 3:55
9. "Cinders" – 4:09
10. "True Intentions" – 4:11
11. "Remorse" – 15:38 [The song "Remorse" ends at 5:31. After 5 minutes of silence (5:31 - 10:31), begins the hidden track "Long Time".]
- All songs written by Sarah Blasko and Robert F Cranny.

== Charts ==
Chart (2004)	Peak position
Australian Albums (ARIA)	35

== Certifications ==
Region	Certification	Certified units/sales
Australia (ARIA)	Platinum	70,000^{^}
^{^} Shipments figures based on certification alone.
