= What the Sea Wants, the Sea Will Have =

What The Sea Wants, The Sea Will Have

Studio album by Sarah Blasko
- Released: 21 October 2006
- Recorded: Roundhead Studios, Auckland; April 2006
- Genre: Alternative
- Length: 48:19
- Label: Dew Process
- Producer: Sarah Blasko, Robert F Cranny, Jim Moginie

Sarah Blasko chronology
The Overture & the Underscore (2004)	What The Sea Wants, The Sea Will Have (2006)	As Day Follows Night (2009)

Singles from What the Sea Wants, the Sea Will Have
- 1. "Explain" Released: 2006; 2. "Always on This Line" Released: 2006

Professional ratings
Review scores
Source	Rating
AbsolutePunk.net	77%
AllMusic	4/5 stars
Tiny Mix Tapes	3.5/5 stars

What the Sea Wants, the Sea Will Have is the second album by Australian songwriter Sarah Blasko. The whole album can be listened to on Blasko's website.

The first radio-only single from the album is entitled "{Explain}". The second single lifted from the album is "Always on this Line" and the third single is "Planet New Year". The single "Amazing Things" was the last single from the album. The album cover was photographed by Warwick Baker.

At the J Award of 2006, the album was nominated for Australian Album of the Year. At the ARIA Music Awards of 2007, the album won the ARIA Award for Best Pop Release.

== Track listing ==
All tracks are written by Sarah Blasko & Robert F. Cranny.

No.	Title	Length
1.	"For You"	5:02
2.	"The Garden's End"	3:54
3.	"{Explain}"	4:05
4.	"The Albatross"	3:24
5.	"Planet New Year"	3:41
6.	"Amazing Things"	4:17
7.	"Always on This Line"	4:10
8.	"The Woman by the Well"	3:53
9.	"Hammer"	4:27
10.	"Queen of Apology"	3:32
11.	"Showstopper"	3:32
12.	"I Could Never Belong to You"	4:21

== Credits ==
- Sarah Blasko – vocals, drum programming, synth, vibraphone, organ, Wurlitzer, acoustic guitar.
- Robert F Cranny – acoustic & electric guitars, piano, Mellotron, organ, harmonium, SH-101, drum machine, bass guitar on "For You", synth bass on "The Garden's End".
- Jeff de Araujo – drums and percussion
- Jim Moginie – mellotron, piano, wurlitzer, toy piano, Omnichord, electric guitar on "Hammer"
- David Symes – bass guitar, synth bass
- Stéphanie Zarka – violin
- Michele O'Young – violin
- David Wicks – viola
- Andy Hines – cello
- Andy Meisel – double bass
- Melaine Vanden Broek – bassoon

== Charts ==
Chart (2006)	Peak position
Australian Albums (ARIA)	7

== Certifications ==
Region	Certification	Certified units/sales
Australia (ARIA)	Platinum	70,000^{^}
^{^} Shipments figures based on certification alone.
