= As Day Follows Night =

Studio album by Sarah Blasko
- Released: 10 July 2009
- Recorded: Atlantic Studios & Decibel Studios, Stockholm, Sweden; February — March 2009
- Genre: Alternative rock
- Length: 47:26
- Label: Dew Process
- Producer: Bjorn Yttling

Sarah Blasko chronology
What the Sea Wants, the Sea Will Have (2006)	As Day Follows Night (2009)	I Awake (2012)

Professional ratings
Review scores
Source	Rating
Allmusic	3.5/5 stars
The Second Supper	4/5 stars

As Day Follows Night is the third album by Australian singer/songwriter Sarah Blasko. It was produced by Bjorn Yttling of Peter, Bjorn and John and recorded in early 2009 in Stockholm, Sweden. It was released in Australia on 10 July 2009. The making of As Day Follows Night was chronicled by Blasko on her blog.

At the J Awards of 2009, the album won Australian Album of the Year.

== Album ==
In regards to the album's lyrical themes, Blasko told Rolling Stone Australia magazine: "The basis is definitely my life, but I like to take it into a heightened reality. I like the idea of 'the character' on the record. I like musicals, I like it to be fancy."

The first single "All I Want" debuted on Richard Kingsmill's show on radio station Triple J on 2 May 2009. Two subsequent singles have since been released "No Turning back" and "We Won't Run". In the UK "I Never Knew" received a special promotional single release in August 2010.

A special edition was also released, consisting of the album, a bonus disc of Sarah performing some of her favourite songs from movies, and four magic ink cards with paintbrushes.

== Performance ==
The album was nominated for the ARIA Album of the Year Award in 2009 and won the ARIA for Best Female Artist. On 4 December 2009, she was awarded Triple J's J Award for Australian Album of the Year. In October 2010, it was listed at No. 19 in the book, 100 Best Australian Albums.

"We Won't Run" and "All I Want" made the Triple J Hottest 100 list for 2009, coming in at 28 and 29 respectively. "We Won't Run" also appeared in the pilot episodes of The CW shows, The Secret Circle and Ringer

"Over and Over" contains a few lines of the Talking Heads song "Road To Nowhere".

== Track listing ==
All songs by Sarah Blasko, unless otherwise noted

1. "Down on Love" – 2:31
2. "All I Want" – 3:54
3. "Bird on a Wire" – 3:14
4. "Hold on My Heart" – 4:04
5. "We Won't Run" – 4:01
6. "Is My Baby Yours?" – 3:38
7. "Sleeper Awake" – 6:18
8. "No Turning Back" – 4:02
9. "Lost & Defeated" – 3:34
10. "Over & Over" (Blasko/David Byrne) - 3:59
11. "I Never Knew" – 4:11
12. "Night & Day" – 4:00

Bonus disc "Cinema Blasko"

1. "Seems Like Old Times" (from Annie Hall) – 2:31
2. "Something Good" (from The Sound of Music) – 3:21
3. "Maybe This Time" (from Cabaret) – 3:23
4. "Out Here on My Own" (from Fame) – 3:20
5. "Xanadu" (from Xanadu) – 3:43

== Charts ==
=== Weekly charts ===
Chart (2009–2010)	Peak position
Australian Albums (ARIA)	5
Belgian Albums (Ultratop Wallonia)	77
French Albums (SNEP)	100
Swedish Albums (Sverigetopplistan)	53
Swiss Albums (Schweizer Hitparade)	58
UK Independent Albums (Official Charts)	24

=== Year-end charts ===
Chart (2009)	Position
Australian Albums (ARIA)	39
Chart (2010)	Position
Australian Albums (ARIA)	96

== Certifications ==
Region	Certification	Certified units/sales
Australia (ARIA)	Platinum	70,000^{^}
^{^} Shipments figures based on certification alone.
