= Depth of Field (album) =

Studio album by Sarah Blasko
- Released: 23 February 2018
- Genre: Pop, Indie pop
- Label: EMI

Sarah Blasko chronology
| Eternal Return (2015) | Depth of Field (2018) | I Just Need to Conquer This Mountain (2024) |

Depth of Field is the sixth studio album by ARIA award-winning Australian singer-songwriter Sarah Blasko. The album was released in Australia on 23 February 2018 through EMI.

== Reception ==
Everett True from The Guardian gave the album 5/5 saying "The songs on Blasko's sixth album feel possessed of a dark undercurrent, the sort of edge that comes around after you have spent one too many late-night hours waiting for your partner to return home from carousing." adding "These are as great as any Australian pop I have heard, from Kylie Minogue to The Easybeats."

Dan Condon said "Depth of Field is an intimate look at the darkness that pervades modern relationships [and it's] proof that Blasko is still pushing into new and exciting creative corners."

== Track listing ==
1. "Phantom" - 4:29
2. "A Shot" - 4:21
3. "Never Let Me Go" - 3:44
4. "Everybody Wants to Sin" - 3:50
5. "Heaven Sent" - 4:10
6. "Making It Up" - 4:30
7. "Savour It" - 4:03
8. "Another" - 3:22
9. "Read My Mind" - 4:24
10. "Leads Me Back" - 4:13

== Charts ==
| Chart (2018) | Peak position |
|---|---|
| Australian Albums (ARIA) | 5 |
