= I Awake =

Studio album by Sarah Blasko
- Released: 26 October 2012
- Recorded: April – August 2012 at Atlantic Studios, Stockholm, Sweden
- Genre: Alternative
- Label: Dew Process
- Producer: Sarah Blasko

Sarah Blasko chronology
As Day Follows Night (2009)	I Awake (2012)	Eternal Return (2015)

Singles from I Awake
- 1. "I Awake" Released: 17 September 2012

I Awake is the fourth studio album by Australian singer-songwriter Sarah Blasko, released in Australia on 26 October 2012.

At the J Awards of 2012, the album was nominated for Australian Album of the Year.

== Background and development ==
Blasko assumed the role of producer for this album, and the recording of it brought the artist back to Atlantic Studios in Stockholm, Sweden, where her third album, As Day Follows Night, was recorded. Orchestral elements were recorded in May, 2012 in Sofia, Bulgaria with the help of a 52-piece orchestra provided by Bulgaria's New Symphony Orchestra.

== Release and promotion ==
Teasing of I Awake began on 10 April 2012, when the singer published a clip of a recording session in Atlantic Studios via her YouTube channel. Two clips of a Bulgarian Symphony Orchestra recording some material were then shared in May, 2012 via the same channel. Finally, the artist added five short clips to her YouTube account between 3 September 2012 and 9 September 2012.

The album and its eponymous first single was officially announced via her website and her Facebook page on 10 September 2012. The single was scheduled for release on the iTunes Store on September 17, 2012. The track list of the album was confirmed on her website on 14 September 2012. The first single was officially uploaded to Blasko's YouTube account on 16 September 2012.

Pre-ordering for the album began shortly after the release of the first single. A standard edition was released, along with a Super Deluxe version which contained a vinyl LP and a book.

== Track listing ==
No.	Title	Length
1.	"I Awake"	3:27
2.	"An Arrow"	3:22
3.	"Bury This"	3:07
4.	"God-Fearing"	4:33
5.	"All of Me"	4:29
6.	"New Country"	4:02
7.	"Here"	4:33
8.	"Illusory Light"	4:03
9.	"Fool"	3:28
10.	"Cast The Net"	3:52
11.	"An Oyster, A Pearl"	4:21
12.	"Not Yet"	3:23

== Charts ==
Chart (2012/13)	Peak position
Australian Albums (ARIA)	9

== Personnel ==
Credits and personnel adapted from AllMusic.

- Sarah Blasko – vocals (all tracks), composer
- Bulgarian Symphony Orchestra – instruments (all tracks)
- Fredrik Kinbom – composer
- Fredrik Rundqvist – composer
- David Symes – composer
