= Eternal Return (Sarah Blasko album) =

Studio album by Sarah Blasko
- Released: 6 November 2015
- Recorded: 2015
- Studio: The Grove Studios
- Genres: Pop, alternative, electronic
- Length: 42:12
- Labels: EMI, Amazon, MVKA
- Producer: Burke Reid

Sarah Blasko chronology
I Awake (2012)	Eternal Return (2015)	Depth of Field (2018)

Eternal Return is the fifth studio album by ARIA award-winning Australian singer-songwriter Sarah Blasko. The album was released on 6 November 2015 through EMI in Australia and Amazon in the US, and in the UK on 5 February 2016 through MVKA.

== Production ==
Having completed a world tour promoting her fourth studio album, I Awake (2012), as well as having contributed to various other musical projects, Sarah Blasko returned to the studio. In March 2015 she announced via Twitter that she was completing her final week of recording for her new album. By late April 2015 further details of the recording were announced on Blasko's website "The as yet untitled album will hopefully be released late in 2015, recorded at The Grove Studios on the NSW Central Coast by Engineer/Producer Burke Reid (Courtney Barnett, The Drones et al) & mixed by Welshman David Wrench (FKA twigs, Jack Ladder, Caribou, Seekae)."

Later in 2015 while promoting Eternal Return, Sarah Blasko revealed to Sydney Morning Herald's Bernard Zuel that she was also expecting her first child during the recording of the album. She stated "It was [a matter of] 'hurry up, he wants to get out'," she says. "It felt like a very special, honest and open time.".

In an interview with The Guardian Blasko further discussed her song writing process for the album citing a new relationship as an influence. "I wanted to write some love songs. There's other subject matter on there but there's no hiding it's about love – capturing the sensation at the time it was happening [to me] in its early fresh stages."

== Release and promotion ==
Two tracks, 'I'd be Lost' and 'Only One', were made available on iTunes and music streaming services in the weeks before the release of Eternal Return. On 11 October Sarah Blasko performed songs from Eternal Return at the Sydney Opera House as part of the Graphic Festival. On 4 November Sarah Blasko announced the dates for a tour that would include nine performances across Australia beginning in Canberra on 6 April 2016 and concluding in Perth on 30 April 2016.

Six music videos were also released to promote Eternal Return. "I'd be Lost", "Only One", "I Wanna Be Your Man", "Without" and two versions of "Luxurious" were made available on Sarah Blasko's YouTube and Vevo channels. The videos for "I'd be Lost" and "Without" were also played on ABC TV's long running music program Rage.

== Reception ==
Eternal Return debuted at No. 6 on the Australian ARIA Charts.

The album received significant praise from music critics.

The Guardian's Everett True who gave Eternal Return 5 out of 5 stars. True stated "This album feels epic, in the way Bruce Springsteen and Donna Summer once felt epic, back around the middle of the 70s, making sad, sensual anthems of everyday observation and desire that many people mistook for throwaway radio fodder."

Ingmar Duldig of The AU Review applauded Blasko's positive approach to the topic of new love.

Rolling Stone's Annabel Ross gave Eternal Return 4/5 stars and described it as "...a love album that's unequivocal in its declaration, but stylistically its position is less obvious, and much more interesting."

Julie Palmer of The Hertfordshire Mercury recommended Eternal Return and described it, her first experience at hearing a Sarah Blasko album, as a delight.

== Track listing ==
Eternal Return was produced by Burke Reid and mixed by David Wrench. Written by Sarah Blasko, Ben Fletcher, David Hunt and Nick Wales.

1. I Am Ready 4:29
2. I Wanna Be Your Man 3:53
3. Better With You 4:23
4. I'd Be Lost 4:30
5. Maybe This Time 3:40
6. Beyond 3:57
7. Luxurious 4:51
8. Only One 4:16
9. Say What You Want 4:24
10. Without 3:59

== Charts ==
Chart (2015)	Peak position
Australian Albums (ARIA)	6
