= Sarah Blasko =

Australian indie rock musician (born 1976)

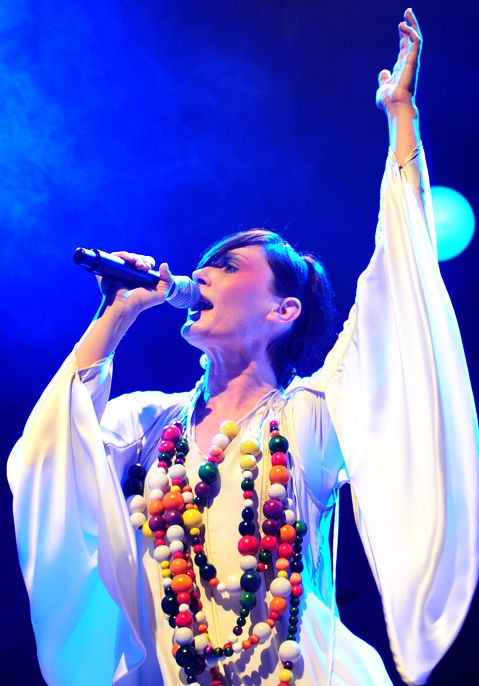
- Blasko performing at the Astor Theatre in Perth, November 2010

Background information
- Also known as: Sarah Semmens; Sorija
- Born: Sarah Elizabeth Blaskow; 23 September 1976 (age 50); Sydney, New South Wales, Australia
- Genres: Indie rock; indie pop; anti-folk
- Occupations: Singer; songwriter; musician; record producer
- Instruments: Vocals; piano; keyboards; organ; vibraphone; guitar
- Years active: 1991–present
- Labels: Dew Process; Universal; Low Altitude
- Website: www.sarahblasko.com

Sarah Elizabeth Blaskow (born 23 September 1976), known professionally as Sarah Blasko, is an Australian singer, songwriter, musician and record producer. From April 2002, Blasko developed her solo career after fronting Sydney-based band Acquiesce between the mid-1990s and 2001. She had performed under her then married name, Sarah Semmens, and, after leaving Acquiesce, as Sorija in a briefly existing duo of that name. As a solo artist, Blasko has released seven studio albums: The Overture & the Underscore (11 October 2004); What the Sea Wants, the Sea Will Have (21 October 2006), which peaked at No. 7 on the ARIA Albums Chart; As Day Follows Night (10 July 2009), which reached No. 5; I Awake (26 October 2012), which made No. 9, Eternal Return (6 November 2015); Depth of Field (23 February 2018); and I Just Need to Conquer This Mountain (1 November 2024).

At the ARIA Music Awards of 2007, Blasko won Best Pop Release for her second album. Her third album won the Best Female Artist in 2009 and her fourth album was nominated for the same category in 2013. In October 2010, As Day Follows Night was listed at No. 19 in the book 100 Best Australian Albums; the authors noted that it "turned on emotional subtlety and instrumental clarity. It sounded like little else in 2009, or most any other year".

== Early life ==
Sarah Blasko is the stage name of Sarah Elizabeth Blaskow, who was born on 23 September 1976 and grew up in Sydney. Her family had just returned from French-speaking Réunion, where both of her parents were Christian missionaries. They had attended Christian Life Centre with Frank Houston as their pastor. Blasko's mother, Ellie (died c. 2000 of bowel cancer), was a nurse and her father, Nikolai David Blaskow, was a teacher at Gippsland Grammar School. Her father is from a Bulgarian-German background. Blasko has an older sister, Kate. Upon their return to Australia, her parents frequently changed denominations including Anglican, Baptist, Uniting, and Charismatic; and settled at a Pentecostal church in Sydney, which later became the Hillsong Church. Blasko started singing at church. She later recalled "[music] was something I kind of fell into. My sister was always the singer of the family, I wanted to be a vet. I grew up going to church which was often a very musical place".

While Blasko was attending high school, she formed a jazz-blues group with Kate. By the age of 15, Blasko was concerned that she "wouldn't make it" and this was partially influenced by the church's apocalyptic message of the "End of the World" and "Christ's Return". She eventually left the church in her final year of school, declaring that its emphasis on material success "just didn't fit" with her, or her interpretation of the scriptures. However, she has since stated that she still believes in God, despite her perception that such an admission is unpopular in Australia. By the age of 18, she had written her first songs. She had no formal singing lessons until age 19 and she also started playing guitar. At university, Blasko completed a degree in English literature and film.

=== Acquiesce and Sorija ===
In the mid-1990s, Blasko joined a Sydney band, Acquiesce, on lead vocals, with founding members Paul Camilleri on guitar, Steve Foxe on violin, Dave Hemmings on drums, Ted Langtree on bass guitar and her sister, Kate Halcrow, on harmony vocals. By 1998, tracks were co-written by Blasko and Camilleri, the group recorded an extended play, Aa for Acquiesce, which was released in September 1999. Also that year, the group won a New South Wales campus band competition and received greater local attention. Dave Cullen (of Brotherhood Lush) replaced Langtree on bass guitar and they released a single, "Breathing In", in November 2000. Both EP and single were produced by Hugh Wilson (King Luan, Vertigo, Science for Girls, Brooklyn Social, Huboi, The Blue Phoenix).

Acquiesce disbanded by January 2001 and Blasko, as Sorija, teamed up with acoustic guitarist Nick Schneider in a short-lived project, also named Sorija. Blasko remembered that "[things] started getting weird with the last band I was in when we ended up going to counselling together! This was about the time that I decided to leave and started working on some solo stuff". As an acoustic pop-electronic duo, they played gigs in Sydney until April 2002. Songs performed by the duo and written by Blasko include "Be Tonight" and "New Religion"; co-written with Schneider: "Will You Ever Know" and "Your Way"; co-written with Wilson: "Sweet Surrender" and "Follow the Sun".

== Solo career ==
=== 2002–2003: Prelusive ===
By April 2002, Blasko was performing as a solo artist and, in late September, she released her debut six-track EP Prelusive, all the tracks were previously performed by Sorija. For the EP Blasko provided vocals, guitar and keyboards, and co-produced it with Schneider (also on guitar, keyboards, and flute) and Wilson (also on guitar and keyboards). Other session musicians were Jeff de Arujo on drums and Willem New on bass guitar. Two tracks were solely written by Blasko, two co-written with Schneider and two with Wilson. She launched the EP at The Hopetoun Hotel, and by October the lead track, "Your Way", had been added to national radio station Triple J's play list. She produced the music video for "Your Way", which appeared on Channel V and rage in November.

Blasko had released and promoted her material independently, with financial assistance from her then-manager, Craig New. She explained "[I was] starting to get my head around computer home recording ... I decided to put out my own EP independently. Most of it was recorded at home. I was fortunate enough to have JJJ pick up on one of the tracks almost immediately". Blasko signed to Brisbane-based label, Dew Process, which repackaged and re-released Prelusive in March 2003. At the ARIA Music Awards of 2003 she received her first nomination: as Best Female Artist for her work on Prelusive and "Your Way".

=== 2004–2005: The Overture & the Underscore ===
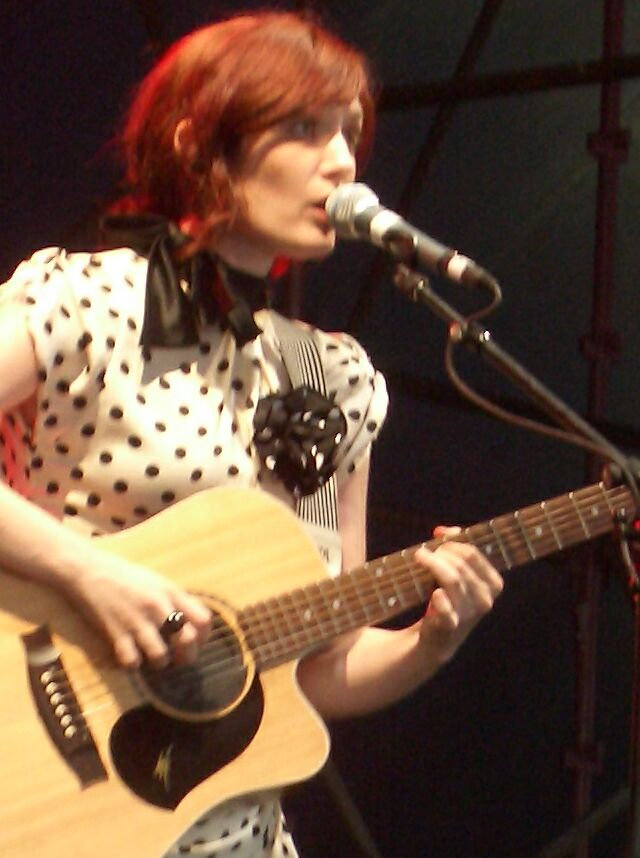
Blasko singing and on acoustic guitar, Big Day Out, Melbourne, January 2006

On 11 October 2004, Blasko released her debut studio album, The Overture & the Underscore, which had been recorded in Hollywood at the studio of engineer Wally Gagel during the first half of the year. She co-produced the album with Gagel and fellow songwriter Robert F. Cranny. Gagel engineered and mixed the album, with assistance from Bruce MacFarlane. Joey Waronker (Beck, Atoms for Peace) played drums and percussion on all songs, while Cranny played various instruments on the album. Blasko recalled: "I stayed in a backpackers hostel right near Hollywood Boulevard and worked on the album six days a week for two months ... I really wanted there to be something pretty classic about it. I was honestly surprised by what a 'complete' record it sounded to me when I stepped away from it".

The album peaked in the Top 40 on the ARIA Albums Chart. It was reviewed by Bernard Zuel of The Sydney Morning Herald, who felt "Blasko works in the territory where Ed Harcourt and Fiona Apple shine, taking some of the new acoustic framework (think Turin Brakes) and some of the folk-meets-electronica stuff that came out in the post-Portishead years and applies them to straightforward pop songs". Allmusic's Tammy La Gorce finds Blasko is "an entrancing artist who sings exceptionally well but is bent on making you guess what brews within her heart rather than pouring it out to you". Triple J declared it the Feature Album of the Week because it is "a beautiful encapsulation of her life and influences and a showcase for her truly amazing voice".

Three music videos were produced for album tracks: "Don't U Eva", "Always Worth It" and "Perfect Now". Her debut EP and album were focused around acoustic guitar and utilised both live and programmed drums. At the ARIA Music Awards of 2005, Blasko received four nominations: Album of the Year, Best Female Artist, Breakthrough Artist – Album, and Best Pop Release. By 2008 The Overture & the Underscore received platinum accreditation by ARIA for shipment of over 70,000 copies.

=== 2006–2007: What the Sea Wants, the Sea Will Have ===
Blasko spent April 2006 recording her second album, What the Sea Wants, the Sea Will Have, in Auckland, New Zealand, at Roundhead Studio, which is owned by Crowded House frontman, Neil Finn. She co-produced the album with Cranny and Jim Moginie (ex-Midnight Oil), which featured musical contributions from Dave Symes, de Araujo, Moginie and Cranny, and was mixed by Victor Van Vugt. All the tracks were co-written by Blasko with Cranny. The album was released in Australia on 21 October, which debuted at No. 7 on the ARIA Albums Charts, and in 2008 it received platinum accreditation.

Zuel felt the album "doesn't sound like a 15-year-old's choice. It is darker and more subdued than her debut, which sold to teens and adults and marked Blasko as an intriguing rising star; the second album is liberally spotted with regrets, plans for reconciliations and a quest to make sense of life". Susan Frances at AbsolutePunk.net rates the musicianship and production higher than Blasko's vocals, where "[she] is made up to sound more impressive than she actually is on the album ... [she has] a limited range so the tunes have a mundane drone. Her vocal melodies transform the girl next door to a femme fatale figure which may explain why so many of those radiant reviews for her album come from male writers". Frances summarises the album as "pleasant and relates to people who are going through a loss or a low point in their lives ... tailored for those going through woeful moods".

The first radio-only single released from the album was "[explain]" on 11 September, with a music video previously viewable at her official website. Other videos were provided for her next single, "Always on this Line", and for "Planet New Year". "Always on this Line" was listed at No. 58 and "[explain]" at No. 79 on Triple J's Hottest 100 for 2006. In October 2006 Blasko showcased tracks from her second album with an appearance at the Legs 11 concert, a breast cancer benefit, which included Tex Perkins and Tim Rogers playing with the Sydney Youth Orchestra. At the ARIA Music Awards of 2007 Blasko won her first trophy: Best Pop Release; she was also nominated for Best Female Artist, Best Cover Art (with Sharon Chai); and Paul McKercher was nominated for Engineer of the Year for the album.

=== 2008-2009: As Day Follows Night ===
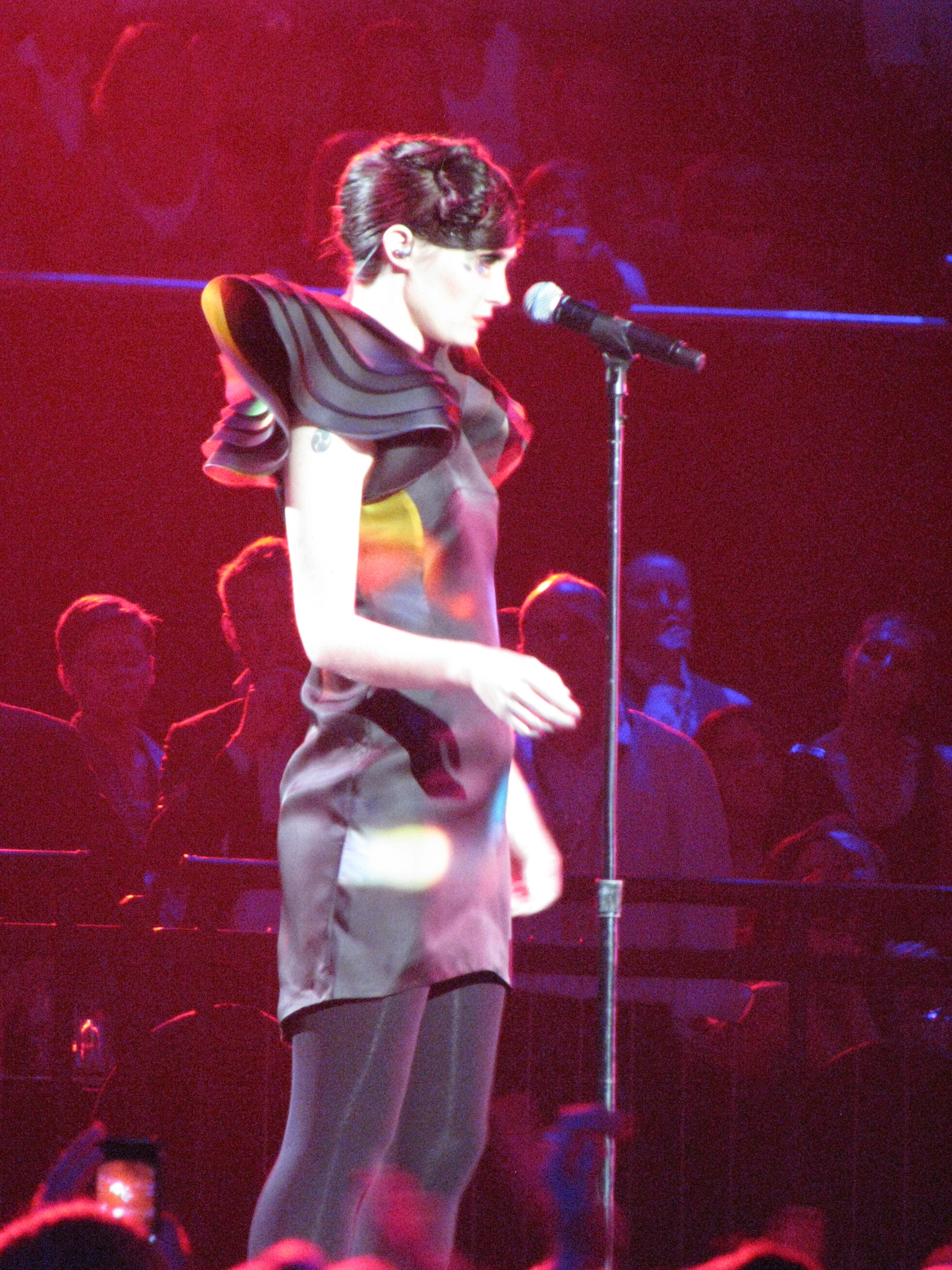
Blasko performing at the ARIA Music Awards ceremony, Acer Arena, Sydney, in November 2009. She won Best Female Artist for her third studio album, As Day Follows Night.

In 2008, Blasko co-composed the score, with Stefan Gregory (sound designer), for Bell Shakespeare's production of Hamlet, which ran from June to August. Diana Simmonds of Stage Noise was disappointed by an aspect of the opening night "[l]ess successful on opening night at least were the songs which open and then punctuate the action, composed and performed by [Blasko]. Her face mike and/or the sound balance muddied the lyrics and the one thing you need in Shakespeare is to hear the words". Whereas Helen Barry of Australian Stage felt Blasko was "truly sublime ... [h]er musical accompaniments add a layer of melancholy rapture to the performance which goes to the heart of Hamlet's grief, anger and loss. Ingeniously, Blasko is incorporated into the production itself as one of the players, which creates a seamless quality to her musical interludes".

While working on the Hamlet score, Blasko also began composing for her third studio album, As Day Follows Night. She had written all the tracks on her own – except "Over & Over", which was co-written with David Byrne – without input from long term co-writer and co-producer, Cranny. From late January 2009 Blasko recorded it in Stockholm, Sweden, and blogged on her official site about her experiences. She decided to record in a simpler and more straight forward manner – without electric guitars and keyboards. The album was produced by Bjorn Yttling (of Peter Bjorn and John) and was released in Australia on 10 July, peaking at No. 5 on the ARIA Albums Chart. It appeared in the Top 100 on European albums charts: Belgium, France, Sweden, and Switzerland.

Jason Treuen described the album for Rolling Stone as "a bold step in [her] journey as an artist and one that strips off the layers of her previous work to expose both her startling talent and her most naked emotions and fears". Adam Greenberg for Allmusic felt it followed "a more piano-driven path. The result is a surprising one. [Her] voice is at once fragile and careful, holding a lot of breathy similarities to contemporary female singer/songwriters (including Feist and Sara Bareilles), while the music incorporates many contemporary touches from the meeting points between electronica and folk. Though there are pieces of tinkling, lilting modernity throughout, there are also massive throwbacks to sounds that, in today's world, are seemingly lost and gone".

The lead single, "All I Want", appeared ahead of the album in May but did not reach the Australian top 50. Its second single, "We Won't Run", peaked at No. 44 on the ARIA Singles Chart, and No. 21 on the Belgian Ultratip Chart. At the ARIA Music Awards of 2009 Blasko won her second trophy: Best Female Artist; her album was also nominated for Album of the Year, Best Pop Release, and Best Cover Art (with Sharon Chai); while "All I Want" was nominated for Best Video – directed by Head Pictures, Damon Escott, Stephen Lance. By the end of the year the album had received platinum accreditation. In October 2010 it was listed at No. 19 in the book, 100 Best Australian Albums; the authors noted that it "turned on emotional subtlety and instrumental clarity. It sounded like little else in 2009, or most any other year".

In July 2009 Blasko had also released a live album, Live at the Forum, which had been recorded during a performance at the Melbourne venue, Forum Theatre. During mid-2010 she repackaged As Day Follows Night with Live at the Forum for a 2× CD album. Nick Mason of The Dwarf website felt that although "[the live disc] showcases without doubt a faithful recreation of her latest work", it was "a fairly flimsy bonus to an album that can easily stand alone in its brilliance".

=== 2010-2011: Seeker Lover Keeper ===
During August 2010, Blasko recorded an album, Seeker Lover Keeper, in New York for the group of the same name with fellow founding members and Australian singer-songwriters, Sally Seltmann and Holly Throsby. The group's debut album peaked at No. 3 on the ARIA Albums Charts in June 2011, Blasko's highest chart entry. The trio embarked on a national tour to promote the album in June and July that year. Of the album's 12 tracks each of the artists had an equal share of four tracks, however Blasko takes lead vocal on five tracks including "Rely on Me" written by Throsby, Blasko described "I was reluctant to do it but the girls kept asking me. I couldn't hear myself singing that one until Holly made me do it. I enjoyed it because the song has real generosity to it". Greenberg felt Blasko's lead vocals were on the "most memorable tracks, using her signature form of lilting power". By year's end, all three artists had returned to their respective solo careers.

=== 2012-2014: I Awake ===
On 26 October 2012, Blasko issued her fourth studio album, I Awake, which reached No. 9 on the ARIA Albums Chart. To start recording tracks, she had travelled first to Sweden earlier in the year and then in May went on to Sofia where she was backed by the Bulgarian Symphony Orchestra with strings arranged by Nicholas Wales. Blasko produced the album on her own, as her preferred choice, Yttling, was unavailable. Beat Magazine's Chris Girdler noted "[it] has a completely different feel to [Seeker Lover Keeper] ... [and] is an insular, soul-searching piece that gets its balance from Blasko's gorgeous vocal guiding us through the trials and tribulations, as well as a sympathetic symphonic instrumentation". Craig Mathieson at The Age noted her last two albums were "starkly personal song cycles, staffed by jazz-inflected rhythms, sparsely exotic textures and a relentless sense of an artist getting to grips with her life. But if the previous record embraced solitude as a means of self-control, then the new one tackles coming to grips with the outside world". To promote the album, in February the next year, she toured every Australian state: where she invited the local capital city orchestra to accompany her on stage. At the ARIA Music Awards of 2013 Blasko was nominated for Best Female Artist and Best Contemporary Adult Album.

=== 2015–2016: Eternal Return ===
In 2015, Blasko collaborated with Nick Wales, a Sydney-based composer, to co-create the soundtrack for Emergence, a theatre dance performance. The album of the same name was issued in May 2015 by Blasko and Wales. In August 2015 Blasko announced that her fifth studio album, Eternal Return, was due for release in November with a preview in September–October at the Sydney Opera House. On 6 November 2015 Eternal Return was released. The album debuted on the Australian ARIA charts at #6. In the same week of Eternal Return's release Blasko announced a tour in support of the album that would take place in April 2016. At the ARIA Music Awards of 2016 Blasko was nominated for Best Female Artist and won for Best Adult Alternative Album.

=== 2017–present: Depth of Field & I Just Need to Conquer This Mountain ===
On 10 November 2017, Blasko announced her sixth studio album called, Depth of Field. This came with the announcement of the first single from the album "Phantom" and accompanying video directed by Mclean Stephenson. Much of Depth of Field was written and recorded during a two-week artist residency at Campbelltown Arts Centre in Sydney, Australia, alongside long time collaborator Nick Wales, David Hunt, and Ben Fletcher. The album was released on 23 February 2018.

During the writing and recording process of Depth of Field, film maker Brendan Fletcher filmed the process and turned the footage into an upcoming documentary called Blasko, Narrated by Blasko herself, the documentary is an intimate portrait of the artist as she composes the new album. The documentary aired on 14 November 2017 on the Australian Broadcasting Corporation.

Blasko provided original songs for the soundtrack of Bell Shakespeare's 2023 production of Twelfth Night. She was initially hesitant to approach the comedy play; however, upon reading it, "[she] realised that characters like Sebastian and Viola are experiencing a huge amount of grief" and that "the treatment of Malvolio" is "really intense". Travis Johnson of TimeOut praised Blasko's originals, "reminding us that, for all the ribaldry, the story is rooted in real emotion and longing".

In July 2024, Blasko announced I Just Need to Conquer This Mountain will be released in November 2024.

== Touring ==
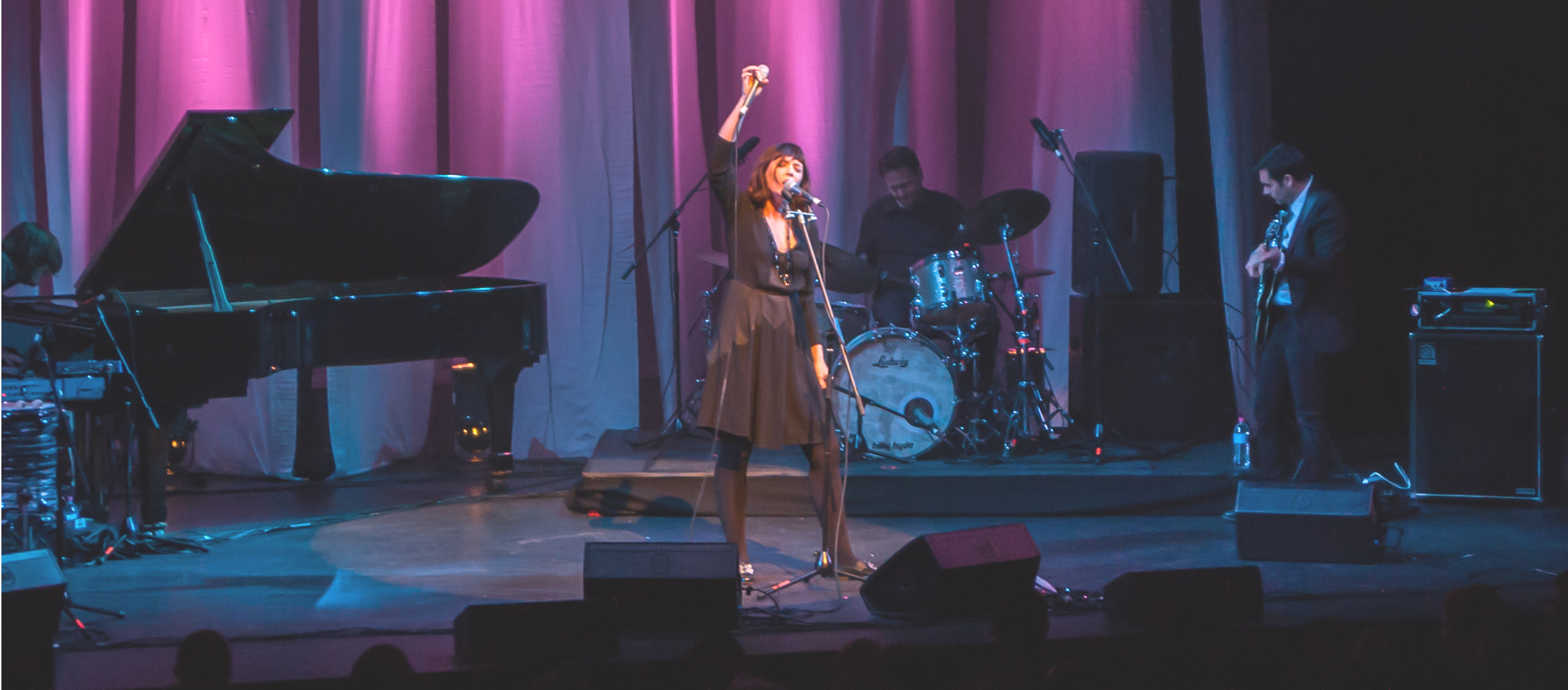
Blasko performing with her backing band in July 2013. They are Ben Fletcher (ex-Bluebottle Kiss, The Devoted Few) on guitar and other instruments; David Hunt on piano and ukulele; Fredrik Rundqvist on drums; and David Symes on bass guitar.

Sarah Blasko has toured extensively in Australia, as well as the US, Canada, UK and Ireland. Although the exact configuration varies, she performs with a five- or six-piece band usually consisting of drums, electric and synth bass, acoustic and electric guitar, plus keyboards and various samplers/effects units. Due to the breadth of arrangement, most of the touring musicians are multi-instrumentalists.

She also performed in a duo with Cranny accompanying on guitar and keyboards. In both formats, Blasko plays acoustic guitar and occasional keyboards. She has toured with folk/roots artists such as Ray LaMontagne and played outdoor rock festivals. In March 2005, she appeared at the South by Southwest festival where she wanted to "give some people who don't have a clue who you are, or those who have maybe heard a little about you, the chance to see what you do with their own eyes & ears. More than anything, you've just got to be yourself".

Blasko has toured the UK and Ireland with Tom McRae, and US and Canada with Ray LaMontagne, James Blunt and Martha Wainwright. She has played at Woodford Folk Festival, The Falls Festival, Homebake, Splendour in the Grass, Festival of the Sun, WOMADelaide festival and in 2006 joined the national Big Day Out tour.

In March 2007, Blasko performed a special concert in Perth, Western Australia in the Octagon Theatre of the University of Western Australia. Blasko supported by a string quartet and a local guitarist. In January 2009, Blasko played to thousands at the Southbound festival in Busselton, Western Australia. In May 2010, Sarah Blasko toured the UK supporting The Temper Trap. Later that year she also toured through the rest of Europe. In 2012, Blasko performed with Snow Patrol at their acoustic shows in Melbourne (30 September) and Sydney (1 October). She joined lead singer Gary Lightbody for the duet "Set Fire to the Third Bar".

During 2013, Blasko toured Australia; in February, she was supported by a different state symphony orchestra at each capital city, as well as her regular backing band: Ben Fletcher (ex-Bluebottle Kiss, The Devoted Few) on guitar and other instruments; David Hunt on piano and ukulele; Fredrik Rundqvist on drums; and David Symes on bass guitar. By July she was touring with her backing band and Fletcher was also her support act.

In 2015, at her preview show of Eternal Return, Blasko introduced an entirely new backing band. She was joined by Lawrence Pike on drums, Donny Benet on bass, Sarah Belkner on keys, autoharp and backing vocals, Neil Sutherland on keyboards and synthesizer and David Hunt on guitar and keyboards.

In 2017, Blasko embarked on an extensive tour around metro and regional areas of Australia, performing solo to audiences. Blasko states that she "hopes to reimagine material from all of my albums and premiere some new songs as well", and that it "feels like the right time to challenge myself, take the leap and finally do some headline shows on my own".

== Personal life ==
Blasko married Cameron Semmens in 1997, having been with him for two years prior. Semmens is a performance poet and, in the latter years of being a member of Acquiesce, Blasko performed under her married name, "Sarah Semmens". Blasko and Cameron each had a complementary Shinto tattoo on their respective shoulders. The marriage lasted five years; Blasko told Zuel in 2006 that she had "an early unsuccessful marriage". Album notes for Blasko's debut solo EP, Prelusive, acknowledge Cameron as her muse.

From early 2004, Blasko worked with fellow musician, co-composer, and co-producer Robert F. Cranny, including on her first two albums. Prior to her third album being recorded in January 2009, their creative and personal relationship "had ended some time back".

She appeared at a breast cancer benefit concert in October 2006, as "[other] forms of cancer have affected my family, and I have friends whose families have been impacted by breast cancer. It made sense to me to play at such an event".

Blasko prefers vintage clothes, music, and art. In 2009, she revealed in a Rolling Stone Australia interview: "I like things that are old and have been lived in. It probably started as a kid when my family shopped at Vinnies because we hardly had any money. I like things that stand the test of time".

Blasko gave birth to a son in July 2015, with her partner Dave Miller. She has had periodic bouts of depression and stopped writing during 2016. She considered ending her music career but resumed for Depth of Field.

== Discography ==
Solo

- The Overture & the Underscore (2004)
- What the Sea Wants, the Sea Will Have (2006)
- As Day Follows Night (2009)
- I Awake (2012)
- Eternal Return (2015)
- Depth of Field (2018)
- I Just Need to Conquer This Mountain (2024)

with Seeker Lover Keeper

- Seeker Lover Keeper (2011)
- Wild Seeds (2019)

== Awards and nominations ==
=== APRA Awards ===
The APRA Awards are held in Australia and New Zealand by the Australasian Performing Right Association to recognise songwriting skills, sales and airplay performance by its members annually.

Year	Nominee / work	Award	Result	Ref.
2010	"All I Want"	Song of the Year	Nominated	
2010	"We Won't Run"	Song of the Year	Shortlisted	
2014	"God Fearing" (Sarah Blasko and The Slavey Folklore Quartet)	Song of the Year	Shortlisted	

=== ARIA awards ===
Blasko has won three Australian Recording Industry Association (ARIA) Music Awards from 19 nominations.

Year	Nominee / work	Award	Result
2003	Prelusive	Best Female Artist	Nominated
2005	The Overture & the Underscore	Album of the Year	Nominated
2005	The Overture & the Underscore	Best Female Artist	Nominated
2005	The Overture & the Underscore	Best Pop Release	Nominated
2005	The Overture & the Underscore	Breakthrough Artist – Album	Nominated
2007	What the Sea Wants, the Sea Will Have	Best Female Artist	Nominated
2007	What the Sea Wants, the Sea Will Have	Best Pop Release	Won
2007	Sharon Chai, Sarah Blasko – What the Sea Wants, the Sea Will Have	Best Cover Art	Nominated
2007	Paul McKercher – What the Sea Wants, the Sea Will Have	Engineer of the Year	Nominated
2009	As Day Follows Night	Album of the Year	Nominated
2009	As Day Follows Night	Best Female Artist	Won
2009	As Day Follows Night	Best Pop Release	Nominated
2009	Sharon Chai – As Day Follows Night	Best Cover Art	Nominated
2009	Head Pictures, Damon Escott, Stephen Lance – "All I Want"	Best Video	Nominated
2010	Krozm (Chris Hill, Ewan Macleod and Lachlan Dickie) - "Bird On A Wire"	Best Video	Nominated
2013	I Awake	Best Female Artist	Nominated
2013	I Awake	Best Adult Contemporary Album	Nominated
2016	Eternal Return	Best Female Artist	Nominated
2016	Eternal Return	Best Adult Alternative Album	Won

=== Australian Music Prize ===
The Australian Music Prize (the AMP) is an annual award of $30,000 given to an Australian band or solo artist in recognition of the merit of an album released during the year of award. It commenced in 2005.

Year	Nominee / work	Award	Result
2006	What the Sea Wants, The Sea Will Have	Australian Music Prize	Nominated
2009	As Day Follows Night	Australian Music Prize	Nominated
2015	Eternal Return	Australian Music Prize	Nominated

=== Australian Women in Music Awards ===
The Australian Women in Music Awards is an annual event that celebrates outstanding women in the Australian Music Industry who have made significant and lasting contributions in their chosen field. They commenced in 2018.

Year	Nominee / work	Award	Result
2018	Sarah Blasko	Songwriter Award	Nominated

=== EG Awards / Music Victoria Awards ===
The EG Awards (known as Music Victoria Awards since 2013) are an annual awards night celebrating Victorian music. They commenced in 2006.

Year	Nominee / work	Award	Result
2009	Sarah Blasko	Best Female	Unknown

=== J Awards ===
The J Awards are an annual series of Australian music awards that were established by the Australian Broadcasting Corporation's youth-focused radio station Triple J. They commenced in 2005.

Year	Nominee / work	Award	Result
2006	What the Sea Wants, the Sea Will Have	Australian Album of the Year	Nominated
2009	As Day Follows Night	Australian Album of the Year	Won
2012	I Awake	Australian Album of the Year	Nominated

=== Other awards ===
Year	Award-giving Body	Award	Result
2006	Jack Awards	Best Female Live Performer	Won
