= Dew Process =

Australian independent record label

- Founded: 2002 (23 years ago)
- Founder: Paul Piticco
- Distributor: Universal Music Australia
- Genre: Alternative rock; electronica; indie rock; punk rock
- Country of origin: Australia
- Location: Fortitude Valley, Queensland
- Official website: www.dew-process.com

Dew Process is an Australian independent record label, based in Brisbane, Queensland, founded and owned by Australian music industry figure Paul Piticco.

== Operational ==
The label operates in two primary areas: traditional development of Australian talent and the provision of promotional, marketing and distribution services for artists based in other countries who are looking to establish their music in Australia and New Zealand.

== Management and distribution ==
Dew Process is part of the Secret Sounds group, with offices in Brisbane and Sydney. The label is distributed by Universal Music Australia.

== Current roster ==
- Bernard Fanning
- London Grammar
- Mallrat
- Mumford and Sons
- Old Mervs
- Sam Fender
- Sly Withers
- Tired Lion
- Tkay Maidza
- Tyne-James Organ
- Waax

== Discography ==
Discography adapted from AllMusic and Dew Process.

- The Fergusons - Never Too Young To Hitchhike (February 2003)
- The Fergusons - "Sinner is Red" (14 July 2003)
- The Tremors - Can I Get a Whiskey (29 September 2003)
- The Tremors - Cash Up Front, No Kissing (6 September 2004)
- Sarah Blasko - The Overture & the Underscore (11 October 2004)
- The Grates - The Ouch. The Touch. (14 February 2005)
- Drag - The Way Out (10 July 2005)
- Bernard Fanning - Tea & Sympathy (31 October 2005)
- Expatriate - Lovers le Strange (31 October 2005)
- Sarah Blasko - What the Sea Wants, the Sea Will Have (21 October 2006)
- Expatriate - Play a Part EP (12 February 2007)
- Expatriate - In the Midst of This (21 April 2007)
- Shout Out Louds - Our Ill Wills (25 April 2007)
- Powderfinger - Dream Days at the Hotel Existence (4 June 2007)
- Dropkick Murphys - The Meanest of Times (18 September 2007)
- The Panics - Cruel Guards (15 October 2007)
- Various artists - No Man's Woman (20 October 2007)
- Yves Klein Blue - Yves Klein Blue Draw Attention to Themselves (1 April 2008)
- The Living End - White Noise (19 July 2008)
- The Grates - Teeth Lost, Hearts Won (2 August 2008)
- The Living End - Rarities (15 November 2008)
- Yves Klein Blue - Ragged & Ecstatic (7 July 2009)
- Sarah Blasko - As Day Follows Night (10 July 2009)
- Whitley - Go Forth, Find Mammoth (30 October 2009)
- Last Dinosaurs - Back from the Dead (26 February 2010)
- Ernest Ellis - Hunting (6 October 2010)
- The John Steel Singers - Tangalooma (5 November 2010)
- Guineafowl - Hello Anxiety (11 February 2011)
- Jebediah - Kosciuszko (15 April 2011)
- Seeker Lover Keeper - Seeker Lover Keeper (3 June 2011)
- The Grates - Secret Rituals (17 June 2011)
- The Living End - The Ending Is Just the Beginning Repeating (22 July 2011)
- The Panics - Rain on the Humming Wire (29 July 2011)
- Ben Lee - Deeper into Dream (11 October 2011)
- Bluejuice - Company (11 November 2011)
- Last Dinosaurs - In a Million Years (2 March 2012)
- James Vincent McMorrow - Early in the Morning (re-issue) (13 March 2012)
- Electric Guest - Mondo (re-issue) (15 May 2012)
- Mosman Alder - Burn Bright (22 May 2012)
- White Arrows - Dry Land is Not a Myth (19 June 2012)
- Expatriate - Hyper / Heart (9 July 2012)
- Sarah Blasko - I Awake (re-issue) (6 November 2012)
- Bernard Fanning - Departures (7 June 2013)
- Whitley - Even the Stars Are a Mess (5 July 2013)
- Gossling - Harvest of Gold (1 November 2013)
- The John Steel Singers - Everything's a Thread (8 November 2013)
- James Vincent McMorrow - Post Tropical (10 January 2014)
- Kingswood - Microscopic Wars (22 August 2014)
- Little May - Little May (10 October 2014)
- Bluejuice - Retrospectable (1 September 2014)
- Many Things - Burn Together (11 April 2015)
- Paul Conrad - "Records" (14 July 2015)
- Eves the Behavior - Eves the Behavior (24 July 2015)
- Last Dinosaurs - Wellness (28 August 2015)
- Little May - For the Company (9 October 2015)
- Paul Conrad - "California" (9 October 2015)
- L.K. McKay - "Tip Toe" (18 January 2016)
- Bloc Party - Hymns (29 January 2016)
- The Living End - Shift (13 May 2016)
- Bernard Fanning - Civil Dusk (5 August 2016)
- Tired Lion - "Agoraphobia" (6 October 2016)
- The Panics - Hole in Your Pocket (7 October 2016)
- James Vincent McMorrow - We Move (2 September 2016)
- Kingswood - After Hours, Close To Dawn (17 February 2017)
- Antony & Cleopatra - "Dust" (14 May 2017)
- Bernard Fanning - Brutal Dawn (26 May 2017)
- James Vincent McMorrow - True Care (26 May 2017)
- Chapel - "Do the Marino" (29 June 2017)
- Tired Lion - Dumb Days (15 September 2017)
- Ecca Vandal - Ecca Vandal (20 October 2017)
- Antony & Cleopatra - "Twitch" (16 November 2017)
- Tyne-James Organ - "Watch You Go" (30 November 2017)
- Alice Ivy - I'm Dreaming (9 February 2018)
- Antony & Cleopatra - "The Islands" (19 April 2018)
- The Beths - Future Me Hates Me (10 August 2018)
- Kingswood - "Messed It Up" (25 September 2018)
- Eves Karydas - Summerskin (28 September 2018)
- Amwin - "DeLorean" (4 October 2018)
- Last Dinosaurs - Yumeno Garden (5 October 2018)
- Little May - "Lover" (30 October 2018)
- Joyride - Sunrise Chaser (9 November 2018)
- Antony & Cleopatra - Hurt Like Hell (23 November 2018)
- Waax - Big Grief (23 August 2019)

== See also ==
- List of record labels
