= Kate Ceberano discography =

Australian singer

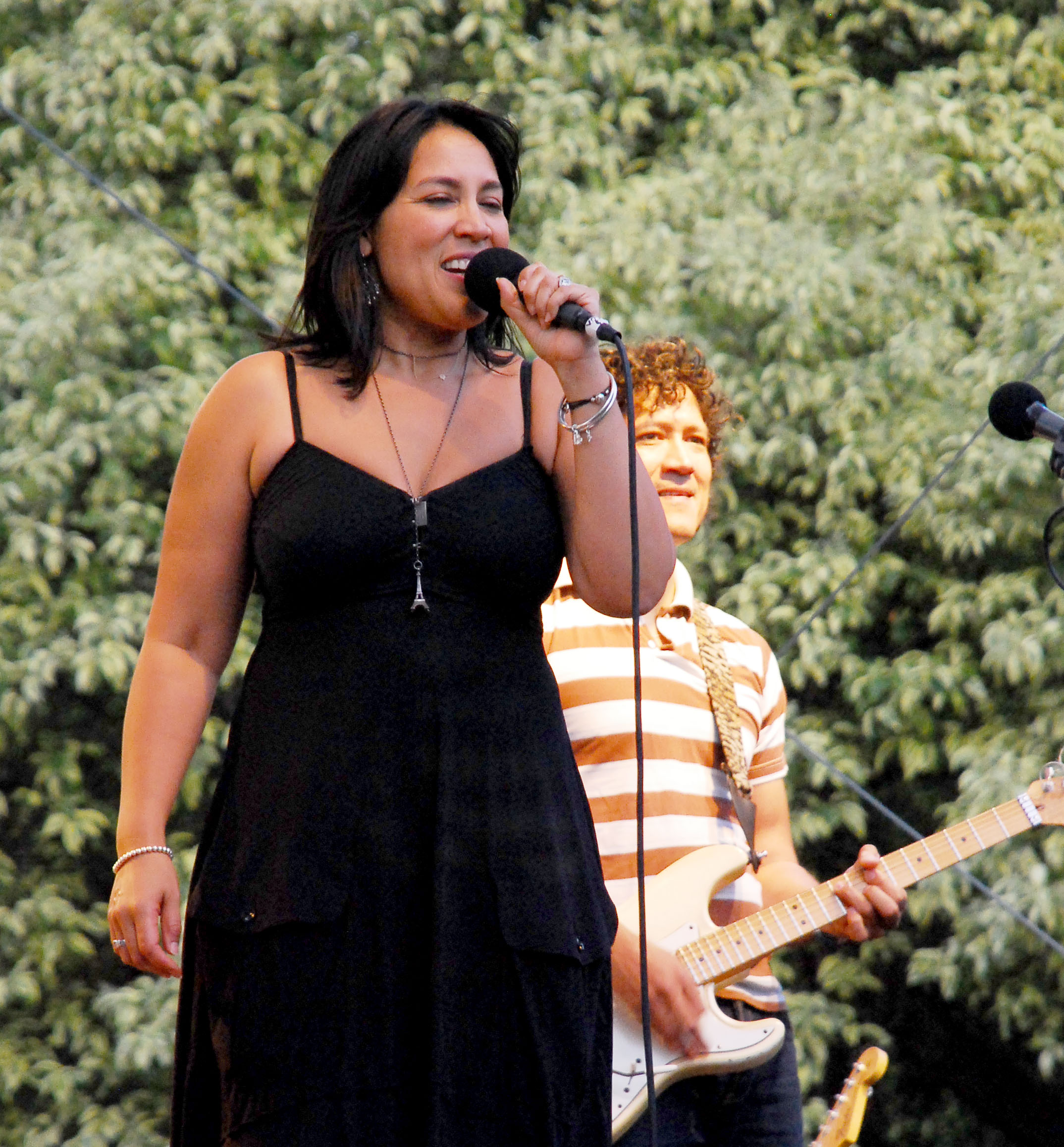
- Ceberano in 2008
- Studio albums: 18
- Soundtrack albums: 2
- Live albums: 5
- Compilation albums: 2
- Singles: 45

Australian singer Kate Ceberano has released 18 studio albums, two compilation albums, five live albums, two soundtrack album, and 45 singles.

In May 2023, Ceberano released her thirtieth career album (18 studio, 5 live, 2 soundtrack and 2 compilations, including 3 albums with I'm Talking), My Life Is a Symphony. As of 2024, Ceberano has 11 platinum and 8 gold albums and has won 5 ARIA Music Awards. Additionally, at the 2026 ARIA Music Awards she will be inducted in the ARIA Hall of Fame.

== Albums ==
=== Studio albums ===
List of studio albums, with selected chart positions and certifications
Title	Album details	Peak chart positions	Certifications
Title	Album details	AUS	Certifications
Brave	Released: August 1989; Label: Regular, Festival; Format: CD, LP cassette	2	AUS: 3× Platinum
Like Now	Released: August 1990; Label: Regular; Format: CD, LP, Cassette	18	
Think About It!	Released: September 1991; Label: Regular, Festival; Format: CD, LP, cassette	24	
Blue Box	Released: July 1996; Label: Mushroom; Format: CD, cassette	18	
Pash	Released: May 1998; Label: Mushroom; Format: CD, cassette	23	AUS: Gold
The Girl Can Help It	Released: September 2003; Label: Ceberano, ABC; Format: CD, cassette	115	
19 Days in New York	Released: September 2004; Label: ABC, Universal; Format: CD, Cassette	52	
Nine Lime Avenue	Released: 27 April 2007; Label: Universal; Format: CD, digital download	4	AUS: Platinum
So Much Beauty	Released: 26 April 2008; Label: Universal; Format: CD, digital download	9	
Bittersweet	with Mark Isham; Released: 10 April 2009; Label: Universal, Earle-Tones Music; Format: CD, digital download	80	
Dallas et Kate	with Dallas Cosmas; Released: 14 May 2009; Label: Prototype Musique; Format: CD, digital download	—	
Merry Christmas	Released: 13 November 2009; Label: Universal; Format: CD, digital download	17	AUS: Gold
Kensal Road	Released: 26 July 2013; Label: Sony; Format: CD, digital download	23	
Lullaby	with Nigel MacLean; Released: 24 November 2015; Label: MacLean, Ceberano; Format: CD, digital download	—	
Tryst	with Paul Grabowsky; Released: 3 May 2019; Label: ABC / Universal Music; Format: CD, digital download, streaming	147	
The Dangerous Age	with Steve Kilbey and Sean Sennett; Released: 31 January 2020; Label: Format: CD, digital download, streaming	—	
Sweet Inspiration	Released: 5 February 2021; Label: Sony Music Australia; Format: CD, digital download, streaming	5	
My Life Is a Symphony	with Melbourne Symphony Orchestra; Released: 12 May 2023; Label: ABC Music; Format: CD, digital download, streaming	6	

=== Live albums ===
List of live albums, with selected chart positions and certifications
Title	Album details	Peak chart positions	Certifications
Title	Album details	AUS	Certifications
Kate Ceberano and her Septet	Released: March 1987; Label: Regular, Festival; Format: Vinyl, cassette, CD, digital download	29	AUS: Gold
Open the Door – Live at Mietta's	with Jex Saarelaht; Released: 1992; Label: Ziga Zuga, Mushroom; Format: CD, cassette	—	
Kate Ceberano and Friends	Released: January 1994; Label: Mushroom; Format: CD, cassette	19	AUS: Gold
Kate Ceberano Live with the WASO	Released: April 2006; Label: Thompson Music, ABC; Format: CD, cassette, digital download	141	
The Monash Sessions	Released: 7 October 2016; Label: Monash University, JazzHead, MGM; Format: CD, digital download	—	
Australian Made Live	Released: 15 August 2025; Label: UMA (7870928); Format: CD, digital download, LP (June 2026)	65	

=== Soundtrack albums ===
List of compilation albums, with selected chart positions and certifications
Title	Album details	Peak chart positions	Certifications
Title	Album details	AUS	Certifications
You've Always Got the Blues	with Wendy Matthews; Released: June 1988; Label: ABC; Format: Vinyl, cassette	7	AUS: Platinum
Jesus Christ Superstar	Released: 6 July 1992; Label: Mushroom; Format: CD, cassette	1	AUS: 4× Platinum

=== Compilation albums ===
List of compilation albums, with selected chart positions and certifications
Title	Album details	Peak chart positions	Certifications
Title	Album details	AUS	Certifications
True Romantic	Released: June 1999; Label: Mushroom; Format: CD, cassette; Note: This was re-released in July 2004 as The Definitive Collection	9	AUS: 2× Platinum
Anthology	Released: 6 May 2016; Label: ABC; Format: CD, digital download	9	

== Singles ==
=== As lead artist ===
List of singles, with selected chart positions and certifications
Title	Year	Peak chart positions			Certifications	Album
Title	Year	AUS	NZ	UK	Certifications	Album
"I'm Beginning to See the Light"	1987	—	—	—		Kate Ceberano and Her Septet
"You've Always Got the Blues" (with Wendy Matthews)	1988	—	—	—		You've Always Got the Blues
"Guilty (Through Neglect)" (with Wendy Matthews)	1988	—	—	—		You've Always Got the Blues
"Bedroom Eyes"	1989	2	38	—	AUS: Platinum	Brave
"Love Dimension"	1989	14	—	—		Brave
"Young Boys Are My Weakness"/"Brave"	1989	15	—	98		Brave
"That's What I Call Love"	1990	30	—	—		Brave
"Dindi"	1990	158	—	—		Like Now
"Nature Boy"	1990	121	—	—		The Crossing Soundtrack
"Every Little Thing"	1991	34	—	—		Think About It!
"Satisfied"	1991	71	—	—		Think About It!
"See Right Through"	1991	33	—	—		Think About It!
"Calling You" (with Andrew Pendlebury)	1992	97	—	—		Don't Hold Back That Feeling (Andrew Pendlebury album)
"Everything's Alright" (with John Farnham and Jon Stevens)	1992	6	—	—	AUS: Gold	Jesus Christ Superstar
"I Don't Know How to Love Him"	1992	38	—	—		Jesus Christ Superstar
"You've Got a Friend" (Bass Culture featuring Kate Ceberano)	1993	100	—	—		BC Nation (Bass Culture album)
"Feeling Alright"	1994	112	—	—		Kate Ceberano and Friends
"All That I Want Is You"	1994	88	—	—		Blue Box
"Change"	1995	100	—	—		Blue Box
"Love and Affection"	1996	91	—	—		Blue Box
"Blue Box"	1996	163	—	—		Blue Box
"Pash"	1997	10	36	—	AUS: Gold	Pash
"Love Is Alive"	1998	57	—	—		Pash
"Time to Think"	1998	—	—	—		Pash
"I Won't Let You Down"	1999	50	—	—		True Romantic
"True Romantic"	1999	79	—	—		True Romantic
"Yes"	2002	—	—	—		The Girl Can Help It
"Higher and Higher"	2004	—	—	—		19 Days in New York
"At Last"	2004	—	—	—		19 Days in New York
"Unchained Melody"	2006	—	—	—		Kate Ceberano Live with the WASO
"Go Your Own Way"	2007	—	—	—		Nine Lime Avenue
"She Will Be Loved"	2008	—	—	—		So Much Beauty
"My One and Only Love" (with Mark Isham)	2009	—	—	—		Bittersweet
"It's Only Christmas" (with Ronan Keating)	2009	—	—	—		Merry Christmas
"Magnet"	2013	—	—	—		Kensal Road
"Falling Slowly" (with David Campbell)	2014	—	—	—		Non-album single
"A Song for You" (with Paul Grabowsky)	2019	—	—	—		Tryst
"I Touch Myself" (with Paul Grabowsky)	2019	—	—	—		Tryst
"Monument City Lights, 1973" (with Steve Kilbey & Sean Sennett)	2019	—	—	—		The Dangerous Age
"My Restless Heart" (with Steve Kilbey & Sean Sennett)	2019	—	—	—		The Dangerous Age
"All Tied Up" (with Steve Kilbey & Sean Sennett)	2019	—	—	—		The Dangerous Age
"Hold On"	2020	—	—	—		Sweet Inspiration
"Sweet Inspiration"	2020	—	—	—		Sweet Inspiration
"Pash" (with Melbourne Symphony Orchestra)	2023	—	—	—		My Life Is a Symphony
"Louis' Song" (with Melbourne Symphony Orchestra)	2023	—	—	—		My Life Is a Symphony
"—" denotes items which were not released in that country or did not chart.

=== Other singles ===
List of singles as featured artist, with selected chart positions and certifications
Title	Year	Peak chart positions
Title	Year	AUS
"You're Not Alone" (as Australian Olympians)	1988	18
"I Touch Myself" (as part of the I Touch Myself Project)	2014	72
"You're the Voice" (as part of United Voices Against Domestic Violence)	2017	—
"Golden" (live) (Smitn featuring Kate Ceberano)	2021	—
"Stop Searching for Love" (Jake Mason Trio featuring Kate Ceberano)	2026	—

=== Other appearances ===
List of other non-single song appearances
Title	Year	Album
"Think About It" (with The Ministry of Fun)	1992	Triple J – Live at the Wireless Volume 2
"Stairway to Heaven" (with The Ministry of Fun)	1992	The Money or the Gun – Stairways to Heaven
"I Want You"	1992	Garbo (The Soundtrack from the Movie Starring Los Trios Ringbarkus)
"Save Your Love for Me"	1993	Triple M Cordless
"Imagine"	1993	The Spirit of Christmas
"Throw Your Arms Around Me"	1994	Earth Music
"Children of the World" (with Jean-Paul Wabotai)	1994	The Spirit of Christmas '94
"Bathroom Habits" (with Cameron Daddo)	1995	I Can Do That!
"Shopping Wisely" (with Cameron Daddo)	1995	I Can Do That!
"Office Waste" (with Cameron Daddo)	1995	I Can Do That!
"Sustainable Development" (with Cameron Daddo)	1995	I Can Do That!
"The 3Rs" (with Cameron Daddo)	1995	I Can Do That!
"Everything's Alright" (live) (with John Farnham)	1999	Live at the Regent Theatre – 1st July 1999
"Help!" (live) (with John Farnham)	1999	Live at the Regent Theatre – 1st July 1999
"Two Hands"	1999	Two Hands (soundtrack)
"I Remember"	1999	The Spirit of Christmas 1999
"Little Drummer Boy"	2000	The Very Best of Carols By Candlelight
"If I Had You"	2001	The Magic Pudding (soundtrack)
"There's Nothing Wrong with Being Wrong Sometimes"	2002	The Women at the Well – The Songs of Paul Kelly
"Every 1's a Winner"	2003	Horseplay (soundtrack)
"Ain't Nothing Like the Real Thing" (with Eran James)	2007	RocKwiz Duets Volume 2
"Trust Me"	2007	The Countdown Spectacular Live 2
"Love Don't Live Here Anymore"	2007	The Countdown Spectacular Live 2
"Santa Baby"	2008	The Spirit of Christmas 2008
"I'll Be Home for Christmas"	2015	The Spirit of Christmas 2015
"I Like Peace I Like Quiet" (with Gypsy Ceberano)	2016	Famous Friends: Celebrating 50 Years of Play School
"Love Is Christmas"	2016	The Spirit of Christmas 2016
"Lead the Way" (live)	2018	Countdown: Live at The Sydney Opera House
"Heart of Glass" (live)	2018	Countdown: Live at The Sydney Opera House
"Dancing Queen" (live)	2018	Countdown: Live at The Sydney Opera House
"Moments" (with Bliss n Eso and Vince Harder)	2020	Music from the Home Front
"Brave" (with Katie Noonan and Karin Schaupp)	2024	Songs of the Southern Skies Vol. 2

== See also ==
- Bear Witness
- Models (band)
