= Anthology (Kate Ceberano album) =

Greatest hits album by Kate Ceberano
- Released: 6 May 2016
- Recorded: 1986–2015
- Genres: Pop, soul, jazz, synth-pop, pop rock, adult contemporary
- Length: 3:36:40
- Label: ABC Music

Kate Ceberano chronology
| Lullaby (2015) | Anthology (2016) | The Monash Sessions (2016) |

Anthology is the third greatest hits collection and 24th album in total by Australian singer songwriter, Kate Ceberano. The album is a three-disc, 53-track greatest hits collection spanning her 30-year career and features all of her hits as well as rarities, live tracks, special projects, and duets with John Farnham, Ronan Keating, Paul Kelly, Wendy Matthews and David Campbell.

"I'm immensely proud of this collection of songs. It is my life's work in song to date and it's been amazing revisiting these memories. I hope everyone enjoys them as much as me," Kate said in a statement. Anthology was released on 6 May.

== Critical reception ==
Professional ratings
Review scores
| Source | Rating |
|---|---|
| Herald Sun | 3.5/5 stars |
| Sydney Morning Herald | 2.5/5 stars |

Cameron Adams from Herald Sun gave the album 3.5 out of 5 saying; "Kate Ceberano has been a proud, lifelong square peg - these 53 tracks the gloriously diverse proof of an increasingly rare kind of career. Her soulful '80s pop with I'm Talking hasn't dated, "Brave" showcases the in-house talent at Ceberano HQ, while disco/house gem "Love Dimension" may be her most underrated single. Even as Ceberano was busy charming the charts, she detoured into jazz and blues, still making dance and rock/pop and the epic Jesus Christ Superstar era. Anthology showcases her rampant song-writing, passionate covers and the fact you never know what's next."

Bernard Zuel from Sydney Morning Herald gave the album 2.5 out of 5 saying; "[Kate's] long, varied, mixed career is all here in a gargantuan triple-disc set. It begins with a "Pash", ends with a hymn and covers theatre, jazz, pop, dance(ish), duets and Christmas fare. It's impressive in its sweep and longevity, but the inadvertently telling absence of a central essay or even chronological written history in the packaging sums up the problem: it has been a career with no discernible pattern or solid beating heart that is purely her." adding "Love Don't Live Here Anymore" is one of her best moments.

== Track listing ==
CD1

| No. | Title | Writer(s) | Album | Length |
|---|---|---|---|---|
| 1. | "Pash" | Kate Ceberano; Mark Goldenberg | Pash | 4:17 |
| 2. | "Trust Me" (I'm Talking) | K. Ceberano; Robert Goodge; Ian Cox; Barbara Hogarth; Stephen Charlesworth | Bear Witness | 3:49 |
| 3. | "Love Don't Live Here Anymore" (I'm Talking) | Gregory Miles, James Miles | Bear Witness | 4:28 |
| 4. | "Brave" | K. Ceberano; Phil Ceberano | Brave | 5:32 |
| 5. | "Young Boys are My Weakness" | Ronald La Pread; William King | Brave | 3:22 |
| 6. | "Love Dimension" | Anderson; Sean Oliver; Kay Montano; Misty Oldland | Brave | 3:46 |
| 7. | "Bedroom Eyes" | Raymond Jones; Sam McKinney | Brave | 3:55 |
| 8. | "Change" | Anna Jolley; Brian Harris; Mark Jolley | Blue Box | 3:59 |
| 9. | "All That I Want Is You" | K. Ceberano | Blue Box | 4:15 |
| 10. | "I Won't Let You Down" | Jim Diamond; Tony Hymas | True Romantic | 4:29 |
| 11. | "Love is Alive" | K. Ceberano; Goldenberg | Pash | 4:15 |
| 12. | "Yes" | K. Ceberano | The Girl Can Help It | 3:45 |
| 13. | "Let Me In" | K. Ceberano; P. Ceberano | The Girl Can Help It | 4:15 |
| 14. | "Champion" | K. Ceberano; James Bryan | Kensal Road | 3:49 |
| 15. | "True Romantic" | K. Ceberano; Goldenberg | True Romantic | 4:18 |
| 16. | "See Right Through" | K. Ceberano; Rob Burke | Think About It! | 4:10 |
| 17. | "That's What I Call Love" | Ashley Cadell; Ceberano | Brave | 4:01 |
| 18. | "Feeling Alright" (with Phil Ceberano) | Dave Mason | Kate Ceberano and Friends | 4:26 |

CD2

| No. | Title | Writer(s) | Album | Length |
|---|---|---|---|---|
| 1. | "We've Only Just Begun" | Paul Williams; Roger Nichols | The Castle (soundtrack) | 3:07 |
| 2. | "I Don't Know How to Love Him" (with John Farnham) | Andrew Lloyd Webber; Tim Rice | Jesus Christ Superstar | 4:26 |
| 3. | "Beautiful Life" | K. Ceberano | The Girl Can Help It | 3:55 |
| 4. | "Falling Slowly" (with David Campbell) | Glen Hansard; Markéta Irglová | non-album single | 3:51 |
| 5. | "Calling You" (with Andrew Pendlebury) | B.Telson | Don't Hold Back That Feeling | 4:04 |
| 6. | "There’s Nothing Wrong with Being Wrong Sometimes" (with Paul Kelly) | Paul Kelly & the Stormwater Boys | The Women at the Well: The Songs of Paul Kelly | 3:51 |
| 7. | "The Cake and the Candle" (with Paul Kelly) | Kelly | Kate Ceberano and Friends | 3:51 |
| 8. | "Living with Lies" | K. Ceberano; Allen Friedman; Fred Maher | Blue Box | 4:38 |
| 9. | "Time to Think" | K. Ceberano; Chas Jankel | Pash | 4:34 |
| 10. | "Love and Affection" | Joan Armatrading | Blue Box | 4:03 |
| 11. | "You've Always Got the Blues" (with Wendy Matthews) | Mickey Newberry | You've Always Got the Blues | 4:21 |
| 12. | "Cry Me a River" (with Wendy Matthews) | Arthur Hamilton | You've Always Got the Blues | 2:47 |
| 13. | "Magnet" | James Bryan; Yuna Zarai | Kensal Road | 3:48 |
| 14. | "You're Gonna Lose Her" (with Paul Kelly) | K. Ceberano; Kelly | new recording | 3:59 |
| 15. | "Bring It On" | K. Ceberano; Vivian Campbell | The Girl Can Help It | 3:29 |
| 16. | "Everything's Alright" (with John Farnham and Jon Stevens) | Lloyd-Webber; Rice | Jesus Christ Superstar | 4:47 |
| 17. | "Help" (live with John Farnham) | Lennon–McCartney | Live at the Regent Theatre | 5:04 |

CD3

| No. | Title | Writer(s) | Album | Length |
|---|---|---|---|---|
| 1. | "A Song for You" (live with WASO) | Leon Russell | Kate Ceberano Live with the WASO | 5:00 |
| 2. | "Unchained Melody" (live with WASO) | Alex North; Hy Zaret | Kate Ceberano Live with the WASO | 4:32 |
| 3. | "Sleep Song" (live with WASO) | Brendan Graham; Rolf Løvland | Kate Ceberano Live with the WASO | 4:20 |
| 4. | "Sunburn" | K. Ceberano | The Girl Can Help It | 4:08 |
| 5. | "The First Time Ever I Saw Your Face" | Ewan MacColl | Nine Lime Avenue | 4:18 |
| 6. | "Throw Your Arms Around Me" | John Archer; Geoffrey Crosby; Douglas Falconer; Jack Howard; Robert Miles; Mark Seymour; Michael Waters | Nine Lime Avenue | 3:33 |
| 7. | "Since I Fell for You" | Buddy Johnson | 19 Days in New York | 4:06 |
| 8. | "At Last" | Mack Gordon; Harry Warren | 19 Days in New York | 2:32 |
| 9. | "A Natural Woman" | Gerry Goffin; Carole King; Jerry Wexler | 19 Days in New York | 4:49 |
| 10. | "My One and Only Love" | Robert Mellin; Guy Wood | Like Now | 4:28 |
| 11. | "Skylark" (with Mark Isham) | Johnny Mercer; Hoagy Carmichael | Bittersweet | 4:08 |
| 12. | "Heroes" | David Bowie; Brian Eno | Nine Lime Avenue | 4:33 |
| 13. | "She Will Be Loved" | Adam Levine; James Valentine | So Much Beauty | 4:03 |
| 14. | "Stars and Satellites" | K. Ceberano; Paul Gray | So Much Beauty | 4:13 |
| 15. | "So Much Beauty" | K. Ceberano; Dallas Cosmas | So Much Beauty | 3:05 |
| 16. | "It's Only Christmas" (with Ronan Keating) | Ronan Keating; K.Ceberano; Paul Barry | Merry Christmas | 3:25 |
| 17. | "Little Robin" (with Nigel MacLean) | | Lullaby | 2:41 |
| 18. | "Emmanuel / Oh Holy Night" (With Mark Vincent) | Adolphe Adam | Merry Christmas | 4:55 |

== Charts ==
| Chart (2016) | Peak position |
|---|---|
| Australian Albums (ARIA) | 9 |

== Release history ==
| Region | Date | Format | Edition(s) | Label | Catalogue |
|---|---|---|---|---|---|
| Australia | 6 May 2016 | CD; digital download | Standard | ABC Music | 4788941 |
