= My Life Is a Symphony =

Studio album by Kate Ceberano with Melbourne Symphony Orchestra
- Released: 12 May 2023
- Studios: Iwaki Auditorium, ABC Southbank, Sing Sing Studios - Melbourne Australia
- Label: ABC Music
- Producers: Roscoe James Irwin, Justin Stanley, Lee Rogers, Duncan Yardley

Kate Ceberano albums chronology
| Sweet Inspiration (2021) | My Life Is a Symphony (2023) | Australian Made Live (2025) |

Singles from My Life Is a Symphony
- 1. "Pash" Released: 13 February 2023; 2. "Louis' Song" Released: 14 April 2023

My Life Is a Symphony is the eighteenth studio and thirtieth career album by Australian singer, Kate Ceberano. The album features new versions of Ceberano's songs, from the four decade career and is a collaboration with Melbourne Symphony Orchestra. The album was announced in February 2023 and released on 12 May 2023. It peaked at number 6 on the ARIA charts.

About the album, Ceberano said "This album was conceived and the orchestra recorded in the last months before the Covid blackout. After several years of waiting to complete it, when I finally got to return to the project and record the vocals it was a very emotional experience for me... back in a studio where i had recorded Brave 35 years before – and with my daughter now singing backing vocals. I never wanted to take anything for granted again. I was more committed, bolder, and more willing to back my stories and songwriting. The power of the orchestra, the arrangements by my talented friend Roscoe have given new life to songs that together we cherrypicked from my albums over the years. Songs that are meaningful to me, earmarking personal memories and travelling with me across 4 decades."

At the 2023 ARIA Music Awards, the album was nominated for Best Adult Contemporary Album.

At the AIR Awards of 2024, the album was nominated for Best Independent Pop Album or EP.

== Reception ==
Female called the album a "breathtaking celebration of Kates's songwriting from across her 40-year recording career."

== Commercial performance ==
The album debuted at number 6 on the ARIA chart. It is Ceberano's 17th ARIA top 50 album, including albums with her Septet, I'm Talking and Wendy Matthews.

== Track listing ==
The album contains ten covers of Kate's previous tracks. "Brave" is from her debut solo studio album Brave, "Time To Think", "Pash", "Sympathy" and "Courage" from her 1998 album Pash, "Sunburn" and "Cherry Blossom Lipstick" from her 2003 album The Girl Can Help It, "Earth & Sky" from her 2009 collaborative album Dallas et Kate, and "Louis' Song" and "Champion" from her 2013 album Kensal Road.

| No. | Title | Writer(s) | Length |
|---|---|---|---|
| 1. | "Brave" | Kate Ceberano, Phil Ceberano | 5:01 |
| 2. | "Earth & Sky" | K. Ceberano, Dallas Cosmos | 4:05 |
| 3. | "Time to Think" | K. Ceberano, Chaz Jankel | 4:43 |
| 4. | "Pash" | K. Ceberano, Mark Goldenberg | 4:56 |
| 5. | "Courage" | K. Ceberano, Goldenberg | 4:45 |
| 6. | "Louis' Song" | K. Ceberano, Paul Cecchinelli | 5:00 |
| 7. | "Sympathy" | K. Ceberano, Peter Vettesse | 4:41 |
| 8. | "Sunburn" | K. Ceberano | 3:45 |
| 9. | "Cherry Blossom Lipstick" | K. Ceberano, Goldenberg | 5:37 |
| 10. | "Champion" | K. Ceberano, James Bryan | 4:06 |

== Charts ==
Chart performance for My Life Is a Symphony
| Chart (2023) | Peak position |
|---|---|
| Australian Albums (ARIA) | 6 |
