= True Romantic =

True Romantic – The Best Of

Greatest hits album by Kate Ceberano
- Released: June 25, 1999
- Genre: Pop, soul, jazz, synthpop, pop rock
- Length: 76:07
- Label: Mushroom

Kate Ceberano chronology
Pash (1998)	True Romantic – The Best Of (1999)	The Girl Can Help It (2003)

Kate Ceberano albums chronology
19 Days in New York (2004)	The Definitive Collection (2004)	Kate Ceberano Live with the WASO (2006)

Alternate cover
- The Definitive Collection (2004)

Singles from True Romantic
- 1. "I Won't Let You Down" Released: May 1999; 2. "True Romantic" Released: October 1999

True Romantic – The Best of Kate Ceberano is a greatest hits album released by Australian recording artist Kate Ceberano. It was a commercial success, peaking at number 9 on the Australian Recording Industry Association (ARIA) album chart, and was certified platinum in Australia. The album was re-released in 2004, under the title The Definitive Collection.

It includes songs from her time with I'm Talking, tracks from Jesus Christ Superstar, her studio albums Brave, Think About It!, Blue Box and Pash as well as two new tracks.

== Track listing ==
1. "True Romantic" – 4:20
2. "Pash" – 4:22
3. "I Won't Let You Down" – 4:31
4. "Calling You" (with Andrew Pendlebury) – 4:09
5. "Everything's Alright" (with John Farnham and Jon Stevens) – 4:49
6. "Love and Affection" – 4:06
7. "Change" – 4:01
8. "Feeling Alright" – 4:28
9. "Brave" – 5:32
10. "Bedroom Eyes" – 3:56
11. "Time to Think" – 4:37
12. "I Don't Know How to Love Him" (with John Farnham) – 4:26
13. "Love Is Alive" – 4:17
14. "Young Boys are My Weakness" – 3:24
15. "All That I Want Is You" – 4:17
16. "Love Don't Live Here Anymore" (I'm Talking) – 4:29
17. "See Right Through" – 4:11
18. "Trust Me" (I'm Talking) – 3:45

Track 8 is a live track.

2CD limited edition (Live at the Sydney State Theatre October 1999)

1. "To Sir with Love"
2. "Brave"
3. "I Don't Know How to Love Him"
4. "I Still Call Australia Home"
5. "True Romantic"
6. "Feelin' Alright" (with Vika & Linda and Vanessa Amorosi)

== Charts ==
The album debuted at number 15 and later peaked at number 9 in July 1999.

=== Weekly chart ===
Chart (1999/2000)	Peak position
Australian Albums (ARIA)	9

=== Year-end chart ===
Chart (1999)	Position
Australian Albums (ARIA)	40

== Certification ==
Region	Certification	Certified units/sales
Australia (ARIA)	2× Platinum	140,000^{^}
^{^} Shipments figures based on certification alone.

== Notes ==
- Tracks 1 and 3 Recorded at Shabby Road, Valley Village, California. Mixed at Sunset Sound Recorders, Hollywood, California.
- Tracks 2,11 and 13 Recorded at Shabby Road, Valley Village, California. Mixed at The Village, West Los Angeles, California.
- Tracks 5 and 12 Recorded and mixed at Metropolis Audio, Melbourne.
- Track 6 Recorded at Chartbound Sound, Gotham Audio and Sing Sing, Melbourne. Mixed at Sing Sing, Melbourne.
- Track 7 Recorded at Chartbound Sound, Melbourne and Studios 301, Sydney. Mixed at Sony Studios, New York City.
- Track 8 Mixed at Metropolis Audio, Melbourne.
- Track 9 Engineered at Platinum Studios, Melbourne.
- Track 10 Engineered at RAK Studios and Maison Rouge Studios, London.
- Track 14 Engineered at PWL Studios, London.
- Track 15 Recorded at Axis Studios, New York City. Mixed at Axis Studios, New York City.
- Track 17 Recorded and mixed at Shakedown Sound, New York City. Remixed at Gotham Audio, Melbourne.
- Remastering: Studios 301, April 1999
