= Open the Door =

Open the Door may refer to:

- Open the Door (Roger Hodgson album), 2000
  - "Open the Door", the album's title track
- Open the Door (Pentangle album), 1985
  - "Open the Door", the album's title track
- "Open the Door" (Betty Carter song)
- "Open the Door" (Magnapop song)
- "Open the Door", a song by Die Antwoord
- "Open the Door", a song by Bad Gyal and Govana featuring DJ Papis
- "Open the Door", a song by James Booker
- "Open the Door", a song by Im Chang-jung
- "Open the Door", a song by Sugababes from Change
- "Open the Door", a song by Zion I and The Grouch from Heroes in the City of Dope
- "Open the Door (To Your Heart)", a song by Van Morrison from Born to Sing: No Plan B
- "Song for Judith (Open the Door)", a song by Judy Collins

== See also ==
- Open the Door - Live at Mietta's, a 1992 collaborative live jazz album by Jex Saarelaht and Kate Ceberano
- "Open the Door, Richard", a 1954 song first recorded by Jack McVea
- Open the door see mountain, a Chinglish expression
- "Let My Love Open the Door", a 1980 Pete Townshend song
- The Open Door, an album by the American rock band Evanescence
