= The Dangerous Age =

The Dangerous Age may refer to:

- The Dangerous Age (1923 film), an American silent drama film
- The Dangerous Age (1950 film), a Mexican drama film
- The Dangerous Age (album), a 2020 album by Kate Ceberano, Steve Kilbey and Sean Sennett

== See also ==
- Dangerous Age, a 1988 album by Bad Company
- A Dangerous Age, a 1957 film directed by Sidney J. Furie
