= Kate Ceberano Live with the WASO =

Kate Ceberano Live with the West Australian Symphony Orchestra

Live album by Kate Ceberano
- Released: April 2006
- Recorded: 4 and 6 November 2005
- Venue: The Perth Concert Hall
- Label: Thompson Music, ABC

Kate Ceberano chronology
The Definitive Collection (2004)	Kate Ceberano Live with the West Australian Symphony Orchestra (2006)	Nine Lime Avenue (2007)

Kate Ceberano Live with the WASO is a live album by Kate Ceberano with West Australian Symphony Orchestra. It was released April 2006, and peaked at number 141 on the ARIA Charts.

== Background ==
On 4 and 6 November 2005, Kate Ceberano performed two concerts at The Perth Concert Hall with the West Australian Symphony Orchestra. The concerts were orchestrated by conductor Sean O'Boyle. Ceberano performed an eclectic collection of songs, featuring Kate's own works as well as covers including "Unchained Melody", "The Drugs Don't Work", and Joe Cocker's "A Song for You". The concert was recorded and released on CD and DVD in 2006.

== Track listing ==
=== CD / digital download ===
No.	Title	Writer(s)	Length
1.	"Intro"		0:56
2.	"A Song for You"	Leon Russell	5:15
3.	"Unchained Melody"	Alex North & Hy Zaret	4:43
4.	"The Man with the Child in His Eyes"	Kate Bush	3:47
5.	"'Round This Time"	Geln Reither, Kate Ceberano & Paul Gildea	3:39
6.	"Calling You"	Bob Telson	4:12
7.	"In the Cave"	Sean O'Boyle	1:17
8.	"The Drugs Don't Work"	Richard Ashcroft	4:43
9.	"Untouchable"	Kate Ceberano, Mark Goldenberg, Paul Kelly & Phil Ceberano	5:23
10.	"Let's All Get Together"	Don Walker	5:38
11.	"Sunburn"	Kate Ceberano	5:02
12.	"Sleep Song"	Brendan Graham & Rolf Løvland	4:23
13.	"Something's Gotten Hold of My Heart"	Roger Greenaway & Roger Cook	4:38
14.	"Cherry Blossom Lipstick"	Kate Ceberano & Mark Goldenberg	5:22
15.	"The Logical Song"	Rick Davies & Roger Hodgson	5:30
16.	"Brave / Pash"	Kate Ceberano, Phil Ceberano & Mark Goldenberg	4:02
17.	"Beautiful Life"	Kate Ceberano	4:02
18.	"State of Independence"	Jon Anderson & Vangelis	6:58

=== DVD ===
1. A Song for You
2. Unchained Melody
3. The Man with the Child in His Eyes
4. Calling You
5. Beautiful Life
6. In the Cave
7. The Drugs Don't Work
8. Untouchable
9. Let's All Get Together
10. Sleep Song
11. The Logical Song
12. Brave
13. Pash
14. State of Independence

DVD Special Features

1. "19 Days in New York" (documentary)
2. "Unchained Melody" (video clip)

== Credits ==
- Conductor: Sean O'Boyle
- Drums: Andrew Fisenden
- Electric Bass: Dane Alderson
- Keyboards, Saxophone: Glenn Reither
- Orchestra: West Australian Symphony Orchestra
- Piano: Aaron Chulai
- Programmed By: Glenn Reither (tracks: 2 to 12, 14 to 18), Julien Lodge (tracks: 13)

== Charts ==
Chart (2006)	Peak position
Australian Albums (ARIA)	141
