= Australian Made Live =

Live album by Kate Ceberano
- Released: 15 August 2025
- Recorded: 29 June 2025
- Venue: Frankston Arts Centre
- Labels: Rogers and Ceberano, Universal

Kate Ceberano chronology
My Life Is a Symphony (2023)	Australian Made Live (2025)

Australian Made Live is a live album recorded by Australian singer Kate Ceberano. The album was recorded in Frankston during her Australian Made Live Tour and released on 15 August 2025. The album debuted at number 65 on the ARIA Charts.

On 5 June 2026, a deluxe edition was released digitally alongside the standard album on vinyl.

== Background ==
The Australia Made Live tour was announced in March 2025 and commenced in June 2025. The tour pays tribute to the 1986-87 Australian tour of the same name, whilst also celebrating the Australian songs and artists that shaped her career. The original 22-date tour was extended in April 2025 due to popular demand and extended again into 2026 with 30 additional "encore performance" from August to November 2026.

Upon release of the tour, Ceberano said, "It's so important for me to express my culture, my Australia, in song. This is a love letter to the artists, bands, audiences and storytellers who I've travelled with over this vast continent for four decades, a deep dive into what makes me an Australian artist: my hungry heart holding their words to my chest, making them the soundtrack to my life".

In July 2025, Ceberano announced the live album would be released on 15 August 2025.

== Critical reception ==
Professional ratings
Review scores
Source	Rating
On Your Markus	5/5 stars

Markus Hamence from On Your Markus said "If you want a record to press play on and feel proud to be Australian, this is your ticket kids. It's not just Ceberano performing – she's acting as a vessel for the country's soundtrack, weaving her story into the wider Aussie narrative." Concluding the review with "It's fun, it's funny, it's heartfelt – and most of all, it's defiantly, unashamedly Australian made."

== Track listing ==
No.	Title	Writer(s)	Original artist	Length
1.	"Australian Made Live"	Darren Hart	n/a	0:10
2.	"Out of Mind, Out of Sight"	James Freud	Models	1:11
3.	"I Can't Help Myself"	Iva Davies	Flowers (later known as Icehouse)	2:38
4.	"Straight Lines" (interlude)	Daniel Johns, Julian Hamilton	Silverchair	0:56
5.	"Hold On"	Kate Ceberano, Rodrigo Bustos, Jessica Fairley,	Kate Ceberano	3:55
6.	"Burn for You" (interlude)	Andrew Farriss, Michael Hutchence	INXS	0:22
7.	"That Way I Made You Feel"	Ed Kuepper	Ed Kuepper	3:22
8.	"Under the Milky Way"	Karin Jansson, Steve Kilbey	The Church	3:48
9.	"All Tied Up"	Ceberano, Steve Kilbey, Sean Sennett	Kate Ceberano, Steve Kilbey and Sean Sennett	3:23
10.	"Quasimodo's Dream"	Dave Mason	The Reels	3:26
11.	"Slave"	James Reyne, Jim Vallance	James Reyne	4:05
12.	"Brave"	Ceberano, Philip Ceberano	Kate Ceberano	3:49
13.	"Harley + Rose"	Joe Camilleri, Nick Smith	The Black Sorrows	3:03
14.	"Wish You Well"	Bernard Fanning	Bernard Fanning	2:06
15.	"You Got Nothing I Want"	Jimmy Barnes	Cold Chisel	3:20
16.	"Eagle Rock" (interlude)	Ross Wilson	Daddy Cool	1:46
17.	"It's a Man's Man's Man's World"	James Brown	James Brown (covered by Renée Geyer)	2:44
18.	"Boys in Town"	Christina Amphlett, Mark McEntee, Jeremy Paul	Divinyls	2:46
19.	"I Touch Myself"	Amphlett, Tom Kelly, McEntee, Billy Steinberg	Divinyls	2:38
20.	"I Hear Motion / Talking to a Stranger"	Andrew Duffield, Freud, Sean Kelly, Barton Price, Mark Seymour	Models / Hunters & Collectors	3:38
21.	"Do You Wanna Be? / Trust Me / Holy Word"	Ceberano, Stephen Charlesworth, Ian Cox, Robert Goodge, Barbara Hogarth, Cameron Newman	I'm Talking	6:50
22.	"Chandelier"	Sia Furler, Jesse Shatkin	Sia	2:22
23.	"Joker & the Thief"	Myles Heskett, Chris Ross, Andrew Stockdale	Wolfmother	1:59
24.	"Pash"	Ceberano, Mark Goldberg	Kate Ceberano	4:11
25.	"Bedroom Eyes"	Raymond Jones, Sam McKinney	Kate Ceberano	3:31
26.	"If You Leave Me, Can I Come Too? / Barbados"	Martin Plaza, Duffield, Freud	Mental As Anything / Models	2:18
27.	"I See Red"	Tim Finn	Split Enz	3:01
28.	"Cake and the Candle"	Paul Kelly	Kate Ceberano and Paul Kelly	2:31

Deluxe edition
No.	Title	Writer(s)	Original artist	Length
29.	"Catherine Wheel"	Megan Washington	Megan Washington	4:07
30.	"Know Your Product"	Chris Bailey, Kuepper	The Saints	1:40

== Charts ==
Chart (2025)	Peak position
Australian Albums (ARIA)	65

== Release History ==
Country	Date	Format	Edition	Label	Catalogue
Australia	15 August 2025	CD, Digital Download	Standard	Rogers and Ceberano, Universal Music Australia	7870928
Australia	5 June 2026	2×LP, Digital Download	Deluxe	Rogers and Ceberano, Universal Music Australia	5716587
