= Please Leave Your Light On =

Studio album by Paul Kelly and Paul Grabowsky
- Released: 31 July 2020
- Recorded: August 23–25, 2019
- Studio: David Li Sound Gallery, Monash University, Melbourne
- Label: EMI Music Australia

Paul Kelly studio chronology
Forty Days (2020)	Please Leave Your Light On (2020)	Paul Kelly's Christmas Train (2021)

Paul Grabowsky chronology
Tryst (2019)	Please Leave Your Light On (2020)

Singles from Please Leave Your Light On
- 1. "If I Could Start Today Again" Released: 17 June 2020; 2. "Please Leave Your Light On" Released: 18 June 2020; 3. "Young Lovers" Released: 17 July 2020

Please Leave Your Light On is a collaborative studio album by Australian musicians Paul Kelly, and Paul Grabowsky. The album was released on 31 July 2020. The collection features Kelly performing songs from nine of his albums, along with the previously unreleased track "True to You" and a cover of Cole Porter's "Every Time We Say Goodbye" to new interpretations by Grabowsky.

The album was announced on 17 June 2020 and in a press statement, Grabowsky said "The performances are intimate, and shine a light on lyrical moments from the Kelly oeuvre. Paul is a generous collaborator, always listening closely to what I am doing, and giving me the freedom to bring my own interpretation to the songs. I think people will hear, and hopefully enjoy, the deep communication that we are bringing to the performances." with Kelly adding "Singing with Paul is like walking a tightrope. It's as if we are acrobats together. We have to pay serious attention to one another to pull the songs off. I like that."

Grabowsky said the album was inspired by Frank Sinatra, Nelson Riddle, Bill Evans and Tony Bennett. "They're massive influences upon me and they've been massive influences upon this project. That was kind of a baseline for what we were trying to do."

At the 2020 ARIA Music Awards it won ARIA Award for Best Jazz Album.

== Background ==
In the early 1990s, Kelly was booked to perform "Winter Coat" on The Steve Vizard show in which Grabowsky was the musical director.

Kelly and Grabowsky met in 1995 while Grabowsky was making a series of television programs for the ABC about different aspect of music-making called Access All Areas. Grabowsky recalls "We talked about song writing. I was struck by the fact that Paul is driven by a similar impulse to my own, namely an ongoing fascination with music in its many forms."

The duo first worked together on a project with the Australian Art Orchestra, called Meet Me in the Middle of the Air, which involved a ten-piece ensemble, Vika and Linda Bull and Kelly singing Grabowsky's arrangements of songs of his which all had biblical references. It toured nationally in 2010.

In 2019, Grabowsky was asked to curate a series of concerts at the UKARIA Cultural Centre in Mt Barker, South Australia, in which I work in duo settings with various singers. Grabowsky asked Kelly who agreed. Kelly proposed that they record and the recording took place at Monash University Campus late in 2019.

Paul Grabowsky told noise11 "Pauls songs cover a very wide spectrum. I cannot think of another songwriter in Australia who has covered as much ground as Paul. In the same interview, Kelly said that not all of his older songs would fit this concept saying "Certain songs are hard to do away from the way they were originally recorded. A good example of that is 'Before Too Long'. I am always trying to sing my songs differently or find new ways to do them but 'Before Too Long' resists another way to do it; the chords move very quickly, there is just no other way to do that song. Another one of my songs is 'To Her Door'. It's got to have that feel and it has that melody that Steve Connolly laid down in stone. Every guitar player I have played with since sees no reason to try and fuck with it. Some songs resist that change but in choosing songs for this album I chose songs that were more manurable, I guess."

== Reception ==
Jeff Jenkins from Stack said "This affair follows a similar formula (to 2019's Tryst with Kate Ceberano): Grabowsky's peerless piano playing accompanying one voice (and some occasional harmonica). The song selection digs deep, shining a light on some gems in Kelly's catalogue... Paul Kelly is rightly revered as our finest songwriter, but his vocal is underrated."

== Track listing ==
All tracks composed by Paul Kelly (except where indicated)

No.	Title	Writer(s)	Length
1.	"True to You"		3:43
2.	"Petrichor"		4:05
3.	"What a Woman Loves a Man"		3:42
4.	"Sonnet 138"	lyrics: William Shakespeare	4:09
5.	"Time and Tide"	Paul Kelly, Alan Pigram	3:00
6.	"Young Lovers"	lyrics: Paul Kelly; music: Paul Kelly, Dan Luscombe, Dan Kelly	4:19
7.	"Every Time We Say Goodbye"	Cole Porter	4:17
8.	"Please Leave Your Light On"		4:10
9.	"You Can Put Your Shoes Under My Bed"		3:22
10.	"Winter Coat"		4:07
11.	"God's Grandeur"	lyrics: Gerard Manley Hopkins	2:20
12.	"If I Could Start Today Again"		3:05

== Charts ==
=== Weekly charts ===
Chart performance for Please Leave Your Light On
Chart (2020)	Peak position
Australian Albums (ARIA)	3

==== Year-end charts ====
Chart (2020)	Position
Australian Top Jazz & Blues Albums (ARIA)	1
Chart (2021)	Position
Australian Jazz and Blues Albums (ARIA)	19

== Release history ==
Country	Date	Format	Label	Catalogue
Australia	31 July 2020	Compact disc; LP; digital download; streaming	EMI Music Australia	GAWD031S
