= Ceberano =

Ceberano is a last name. Notable people with this last name include:

- Kate Ceberano (born 1966), Australian singer and actress
- Tino Ceberano (born 1941), American/Australian karateka
