= Tryst (album) =

Studio album by Kate Ceberano and Paul Grabowsky
- Released: 3 May 2019
- Genre: Jazz
- Length: 63:17
- Label: ABC

Kate Ceberano chronology
| The Monash Sessions (2016) | Tryst (2019) | The Dangerous Age (2020) |

Paul Grabowsky chronology
| Moons of Jupiter (2018) | Tryst (2019) | Please Leave Your Light On (2020) |

Singles from Tryst
- 1. "A Song for You" Released: 29 March 2019; 2. "I Touch Myself" Released: 19 April 2019

Tryst is a collaborative studio album by Australian recording artists Kate Ceberano and Paul Grabowsky, released on 3 May 2019. The album is a collection of love song and reinterpretations from the past 50 years.

At the ARIA Music Awards of 2019 it won Best Jazz Album.

At the AIR Awards of 2020, the album won Best Independent Jazz Album or EP.

== Background and release ==
In 1999 Kate Ceberano and Paul Grabowsky performed a one-off show at The Continental in Melbourne for Valentine's Day. That performance would grow a close and enduring friendship. The album is a set of songs revisiting the theme of the impact of love and loss we all endure.

== Reception ==
Jeff Jenkins from Stack Magazine said "Tryst is the perfect title for this romantic rendezvous, a collection of late-night love songs... this is a magical combination, Ceberano's peerless voice and Grabowsky's exquisite piano playing".

== Track listing ==
| No. | Title | Writer(s) | Length |
|---|---|---|---|
| 1. | "Wild Is the Wind" | Dimitri Tiomkin, Ned Washington | 5:20 |
| 2. | "A Song for You" | Leon Russell | 4:08 |
| 3. | "For Cilla" (medley) | | 13:57 |
| 4. | "Make You Feel My Love" | Bob Dylan | 5:10 |
| 5. | "Suzanne" | | 5:18 |
| 6. | "Melange D'Amour" (medley) | | 9:09 |
| 7. | "The First Time Ever I Saw Your Face" | Ewan MacColl | 6:14 |
| 8. | "I Touch Myself" | Christina Amphlett, Tom Kelly, Mark McEntee, Billy Steinberg | 3:44 |
| 9. | "Forever Young" | Bob Dylan | 4:54 |
| 10. | "Skylark" | Johnny Mercer, Hoagy Carmichael | 5:23 |

== Charts ==
| Chart (2019) | Peak position |
|---|---|
| Australian Albums (ARIA) | 147 |

== Release history ==
| Country | Date | Format | Label | Catalogue |
|---|---|---|---|---|
| Australia | 3 May 2019 | Compact Disc; digital download; streaming | ABC / Universal Music Australia | 7762180 |
