= Sweet Inspiration (Kate Ceberano album) =

Studio album by Kate Ceberano
- Released: 5 February 2021
- Recorded: 2020
- Length: 53:07
- Label: Sony Music Australia
- Producer: Kate Cerebano, Roscoe James Irwin

Kate Ceberano chronology
The Dangerous Age (2020)	Sweet Inspiration (2021)	My Life Is a Symphony (2023)

Singles from Sweet Inspiration
- 1. "Hold On" Released: 15 October 2020; 2. "Sweet Inspiration" Released: 3 December 2020

Sweet Inspiration is the seventeenth studio album recorded by Australian singer, Kate Ceberano. It was released in February 2021 and peaked at number 5 on the ARIA charts.

Speaking about the album, Ceberano said "What should have been a very simple, loving collection of favourite songs, recorded (just because) with friends over a few winters day in Melbourne... turned into an experience that will forever shape my future as an artist. The world turned suddenly upside down overnight with panic and unknowns, and singing seemed too simple – inappropriate and indulgent in the face of the times. But Nina Simone says the artist MUST 'sing for the times' and so I wrote 'Sweet Inspiration'. Inspired by a strong title and series of chords (thank you Rick Price) they sent me in the right direction."

== Reception ==
Zoë Radas from Stack Magazine called the album "one of Kate's best" saying "Most covers albums are pointless, showing an artist out of ideas and playing it safe – a triumph of commercialism over creativity. But the occasional covers collection is something special, providing an insight into an artist's influences as well as giving new meaning to classic songs. These are soothing songs for the soul, and the perfect album for troubled times.".

== Commercial performance ==
The album debuted at number 5 on the ARIA chart for the week commencing 15 February 2021. It is Ceberano's first top 5 album since Nine Lime Avenue in 2007 and is her seventh Australian top ten album.

== Track listing ==
No.	Title	Writer(s)	Length
1.	"If It Be Your Will"	Leonard Cohen	5:38
2.	"So Far Away"	Carole King	4:28
3.	"Sweet Inspiration"	Kate Ceberano, Rick Price	4:16
4.	"If These Walls Could Speak"	Jimmy Webb	3:49
5.	"Mirror Ball"	Guy Garvey, Craig Potter, Mark Potter, Peter Turner, Richard Jupp	5:30
6.	"I Honestly Love You"	Peter Allen, Jeff Barry	4:01
7.	"Hold On"	Ceberano, Rodrigo Bustos, Jess Fairlie	4:46
8.	"When I Need You"	Carole Bayer Sager, Albert Hammond	5:29
9.	"You Needed Me"	Charles Randolph Goodrum	3:43
10.	"You Do Something to Me"	Paul Weller	3:46
11.	"I Will Always Love You"	Dolly Parton	3:21
12.	"The Long and Winding Road"	Paul McCartney, John Lennon	4:20
Total length:			53:07

== Charts ==
Chart (2021)	Peak position
Australian Albums (ARIA)	5
