= Kate Ceberano and Friends =

Live album by Kate Ceberano and Friends
- Released: January 1994
- Recorded: 1993
- Genre: Jazz, blues, pop
- Label: Mushroom
- Producer: Larry Meltzer

Kate Ceberano and Friends chronology
Open the Door - Live at Mietta's (1992)	Kate Ceberano and Friends (1994)	Blue Box (1996)

Singles from Kate Ceberano and Friends
- 1. "Feeling Alright" Released: 14 February 1994

Kate Ceberano and Friends is an album by Kate Ceberano released through Mushroom Records in 1994.

== Background ==
The album was made up of musical selections from the 1993 ABC TV series Kate Ceberano & Friends. The album was a commercial success, charting in the top 20 in Ceberano's native Australia.

== Track listing ==
No.	Title	Writer(s)	Performer/s	Length
1.	"Feeling Alright"	Dave Mason	Kate Ceberano and Phillip Ceberano	4:26
2.	"Now And Again"	Paul Gray	Kate Ceberano	3:58
3.	"Our House"	Graham Nash	Angie Hart	2:59
4.	"I Can't Make You Love Me"	Allen Shamblin & Mike Reid	Kate Ceberano	4:30
5.	"A Song for You"	Leon Russell	Vince Jones	4:47
6.	"I Believe When I Fall in Love"	Stevie Wonder & Yvonne Wright	Kate Ceberano	3:47
7.	"I've Got You Under My Skin"	Cole Porter	Margaret Urlich and Dale Barlow	3:48
8.	"Jesse"	Janis Ian	Kate Ceberano	4:49
9.	"You've Always Got the Blues"	Mickey Newbury	Kate Ceberano and Debra Byrne	3:59
10.	"The Cake and the Candle"	Paul Kelly	Kate Ceberano and Paul Kelly	3:51
11.	"Patsy Cline Medley*"	Hank Cochran, Harlan Howard, Alan Block, Don Hecht & Willie Nelson	Kate Ceberano and Deborah Conway	4:27
12.	"Don't Knock My Love"	Brad Shapiro and Wilson Pickett	Kate Ceberano and Jon Stevens	2:57
13.	"Dream a Little Dream of Me"	Fabian Andre, Gus Kahn and Wilbur Schwandt	Kate Ceberano and The Moovin' & Groovin' Orchestra	2:18
Total length:				54:17

- "Patsy Cline Medley" is made up of three songs; "I Fall to Pieces", "Walkin' After Midnight" and "Crazy"

== Charts ==
Kate Ceberano and Friends debuted at number 31, before reaching a peak of number 19 in Australia in February 1994.

Chart (1994)	Peak position
Australian Albums (ARIA)	19

== Certification ==
Region	Certification	Certified units/sales
Australia (ARIA)	Gold	35,000^{^}
^{^} Shipments figures based on certification alone.
