= Dallas et Kate =

Studio album by Dallas Cosmas and Kate Ceberano
- Released: 14 May 2009
- Recorded: 2006–2007
- Studio: Cromwell Street, Collingwood, Australia
- Label: Prototype Musique
- Producer: Dallas Cosmas

Kate Ceberano albums chronology
Bittersweet (2009)	Dallas et Kate (2009)	Merry Christmas (2009)

Dallas et Kate is a collaborative studio album by Dallas Cosmas and Kate Ceberano. The album was released in May 2009. Ceberano said; "It was such a fun and organic experience making some truly aesthetic art." Additional musicians on the album are Paul Richards, Matthew Shadwick, Clinton Rankin and Bindy Cohen.

== Background ==
In late 2006, Ceberano and Cosmas commenced recording original songs at Ceberano's house. The album was not completed as Ceberano was invited to compete on Dancing with the Stars. In September 2008, Ceberano discussed the recording on her website saying the album "...is a collection of moody originals, very special pieces, all carefully arranged and produced by Dallas. All songs co-written by the two of us and I even got to play drums on a couple of tracks", adding she was "sad to have to let the project go by the wayside". Cosmas finished the work on the album whilst Ceberano competed on Dancing with the Stars and two seasons of It Takes Two across 2007 and 2008. A song from this recording session became the title track on Ceberano's 2008, top 10 album So Much Beauty which led to the long-player, Dallas et Kate finally being released. It also included an early version of "The Little Things", which later appeared in a re-worked form on the 2013 album Kensal Road. Ceberano said "Dal and I share a common love for French pop songs and lyrics that flow like a stream of "Unconsciousness". He is tres groovy and we had a wonderful time experimenting in the studio in my back yard. It should be released sometime soon".

The album was released on independent production label, Prototype Musique in May 2009.

== Reception ==
APRA Magazine said: "This is a journey through creativity where Kate lets go of everything and says exactly what she wants to say. Witness the intimacy and beauty that is Kate Ceberano together with the ever-musical Dallas Cosmas. The beautiful coincidence that has brought the lush vocals of Kate Ceberano and emotive production of Dallas Cosmas together has resulted in the cinematic-pop that is 'Dallas et Kate'. Twelve original compositions exploring melodic themes of the connectivity that is our life in this time and space… This record is a collaboration, produced by Dallas with full input from the Wonderfulls and friends."

== Track listing ==
1. "We Could Be" – 3:27
2. "So Much Beauty" – 3:08
3. "Always Wanting" – 2:42
4. "Everything" – 4:09
5. "Never Let You Fall" – 2:48
6. "Sunday Morning" – 4:16
7. "Wanting More" – 3:24
8. "Radiate" – 3:13
9. "Earth and Sky" – 3:21
10. "The Little Things" – 3:25
11. "Whatever Comes" – 4:06
12. "Courage" – 4:40
- All tracks written by Ceberano / Cosmas except for track 12 written by Ceberano / Mark Goldenberg.

== Release history ==
Country	Date	Format	Label	Catalogue
Australia	14 May 2009	Digital download, CD	Prototype Musique	PM 9316340000688
