= Every Little Thing (Kate Ceberano song) =

Single by Kate Ceberano

from the album Think About It!
- A-side: "Every Little Thing"
- B-side: "Losing You"
- Released: July 1991
- Recorded: 1991
- Genre: Pop, synthpop
- Label: Festival
- Songwriter: Ashley Cadell
- Producer: Ashley Cadell

Kate Ceberano singles chronology
"Nature Boy" (1990)	"Every Little Thing" (1991)	"Satisfied" (1991)

Alternative cover
- remix version

"Every Little Thing" is a 1991 song by Australian singer Kate Ceberano. It was released as the first single from her studio album, Think About It! (1991). It was released in July 1991 on the Festival Records label and spent nine weeks in the top 50 and peaked at No.34 on the Australian singles charts.

== Track listing ==
CD Single

1. "Every Little Thing" - 3:47
2. "Losing You" -

The Remixes

1. "Every Little Thing" (7" Mix) - 3:49
2. "Every Little Thing" (Wicked Thing Mix) - 5:20
3. "Every Little Thing" (The Essence Mix) - 5:49

== Charts ==
=== Weekly charts ===
Chart (1991)	Peak position
Australia (ARIA)	34
