= Lullaby (Kate Ceberano and Nigel MacLean album) =

Studio album by Kate Ceberano
- Released: 24 November 2015
- Studio: Madcat Sound, Huntingdale, Victoria, Australia
- Genre: Children's, Easy listening
- Label: MacLean/Ceberano

Kate Ceberano chronology
| Kensal Road (2013) | Lullaby (2015) | Anthology (2016) |

Lullaby is a collaborative studio album by Australian singer Kate Ceberano and New Zealand-born musician Nigel MacLean that was released in November 2015,

Lullaby was inspired by Kate's Hawaiian background where mothers sing to their children as they go to sleep.

Kate said "Our buckskin baby was born 12 years ago now and I wanted to give her a gift for choosing us as her guardians. And during the making of this album Nigel's son was also born. Together, we were inspired to make an album to soothe both mother and child and set in an early contact with music, lush, classical and quirky. A soundtrack to parenting that could enchant both child, mother and really anyone looking to unwind after a big day. An escape..."

Nigel said "How fortunate to be making a Lullaby album as my newborn arrives! Sleep may be a necessity for babies but little afforded by their carers. With my newborn lying in his bassinet as I worked on these tracks it was the perfect remedy for both myself and my little one. This collection of songs arose around us and kept us feeling calm and full of bliss. The exquisite vocals of Kate deliver a musical cushion for my baby to rest his head on. A beautiful journey that only ends in bliss...."

== Background ==
In 2014 Ceberano became the first Australian woman to be inducted into the Australian Songwriters Association (ASA) Hall of Fame and despite having been in the entertainment industry for over 25 years She counts motherhood to daughter Gypsy as her biggest achievement yet.

== Reception ==
Warren Photography, a friend of Nigel MacLean photographed Kate and her daughter Gypsy. He said of the album; "Lullaby [is] a beautiful soft set of soothing lullabies for babies, kids and mothers."

== Track listing ==
1. "Baby Mine" – 3:35
2. "A Song to Remember You By" – 6:00
3. "Pupuhinuhinu" – 3:28
4. "Owl and the Pussycat" – 4:23
5. "Sleepsong" – 4:04
6. "Little Robin" – 2:41
7. "Buckskin Baby" – 3:26
8. "New World" – 3:41
9. "Hine" – 2:32
10. "Candy Clouds" – 2:38
11. "La La Land" – 2:59
12. "'night Tom" – 2:06

== Personnel ==
- Kate Ceberano – vocals
- Nigel MacLean – arrangements, piano, kora
- Doug de Vries – guitar, cavaco
- Phil Ceberano – guitar, vocals, ukulele
- Sam Lemann – guitar, ukulele
- Emily Rosner – harp
- John Norton – oud
- Ben Robertson – bass
- Laurie Ernst – drums, percussion
- David Bromley – cover art
