= Live at the Regent Theatre – 1st July 1999 =

Live at the Regent Theatre – 1 July 1999

Live album by John Farnham
- Released: 30 August 1999 (Australia)
- Recorded: 1 July 1999
- Genres: Pop, rock
- Length: 59:06
- Labels: Sony BMG, RCA, Gotham
- Producer: Ross Fraser

John Farnham chronology
Highlights from The Main Event (1999)	Live at the Regent Theatre – 1 July 1999 (1999)	33⅓ (2000)

Live at the Regent Theatre – 1 July 1999 is a live album by Australian singer John Farnham. The album was released in Australia on 30 August 1999, and peaked on the ARIA charts at No. 7.

This album features performances from Kate Ceberano, Merril Bainbridge, Nana-Zhami (featuring Farnham's son Robert), James Reyne and Human Nature. This album was recorded on Farnham's 50th birthday, and was a part of the "I Can't Believe He's 50!" celebrations and subsequent tour.

== Track listing ==
1. "Reasons" (S. See) – 4:21
2. "One" (Harry Nilsson) – 2:54
3. "Everything's Alright" (with Kate Ceberano) (Webber, Rice) – 4:17
4. "Help!" (with Kate Ceberano)(J. Lennon, P. McCartney) – 5:04
5. "A Touch of Paradise" (R. Wilson, G. Smith) – 4:46
6. "Age Of Reason"(T. Hunter, J. Pigott) – 4:50
7. "Burn For You" (with Merril Bainbridge) (P. Buckle, J. Farnham, R. Faser) – 4:24
8. "Raindrops Keep Falling on My Head" (with Merril Bainbridge) (B. Bacharach, H. David) – 4:11
9. "Chain Reaction" (D. Stewart, S. Stewart) – 3:53
10. "Infatuation" (M. Brady, G. Goble) – 3:17
11. "Don't You Know It's Magic" (with James Reyne) (Brian Cadd) – 4:11
12. "Comic Conversations" (with James Reyne) (J. Bromley) – 3:26
13. "Who's Lovin' You" (with Human Nature) (W. Robinson) – 4:21
14. "Everytime You Cry" (with Human Nature) (S. Peiken, G. Sutton) – 4:51
15. "That's Freedom" (T. Kimmel, J. Chapman) – 4:35
16. "Playing To Win" (G. Goble, J. Farnham, D. Hirschfelder, S. Housden, S. Proffer, W. Nelson, S. Prestwich) – 3:11
17. "I Wish" (Stevie Wonder) – 3:56
18. "You're the Voice" (M. Ryder, C. Thompson, A. Qunta, K. Reid) – 4:39

== Charts ==
=== Weekly charts ===
Chart (1999)	Peak position
Australian Albums (ARIA)	7

=== Year-end charts ===
Chart (1999)	Position
Australian Albums (ARIA)	51

== Certifications ==
Region	Certification	Certified units/sales
Australia (ARIA)	Platinum	70,000^{^}
^{^} Shipments figures based on certification alone.
