= Love Dimension =

Single by Kate Ceberano

from the album Brave
- A-side: "Love Dimension"
- B-side: "Like Now"
- Released: 10 July 1989
- Recorded: Platinum Studios, Melbourne
- Genre: Pop, synthpop
- Label: Festival
- Songwriters: Anderson, Sean Oliver, Kay Montano, Misty Oldland
- Producers: Ashley Cadell, Nick Launay, Phil Ceberano

Kate Ceberano singles chronology
"Bedroom Eyes" (1989)	"Love Dimension" (1989)	"Brave/ Young Boys are My Weakness" (1989)

"Love Dimension" is a 1989 song by Australian singer Kate Ceberano. It was released in July 1989 on Festival Records as the second single from her third solo album, Brave. The single spent thirteen weeks in the top 50 of the Australian singles charts and peaked at No.14.

== Track listing ==
12" single / Cass Single Track listing

No.	Title	Writer(s)	Length
1.	"Love Dimension"	Anderson, Sean Oliver, Kay Montano, Misty Oldland	3:46
2.	"Love Dimension (Hyper Mix)" (Produced by Peewee Ferris)	Anderson, Sean Oliver, Kay Montano, Misty Oldland	6:35

CD single Track listing

No.	Title	Writer(s)	Length
1.	"Love Dimension"	Anderson, Sean Oliver, Kay Montano, Misty Oldland	3:46
2.	"Love Dimension (Hyper Mix)" (Produced by PeeWee Ferris)	Anderson, Sean Oliver, Kay Montano, Misty Oldland	6:35
3.	"Love Dimension (Dimented Mix)" (Produced by PeeWee Ferris)	Anderson, Sean Oliver, Kay Montano, Misty Oldland	6:06
4.	"Like Now" (Produced by Kate Ceberano And Her Sextet)	Jex Saarelaht, Russell Smith	3:37

== Charts ==
=== Weekly charts ===
Chart (1989)	Peak position
Australia (ARIA)	14

==== Year-end charts ====
Chart (1989)	Position
Australia (ARIA)	89
