= Like Now =

Studio album by Kate Ceberano
- Released: August 1990
- Genre: Jazz; blues; pop
- Length: 50:03
- Label: Regular
- Producer: Various

Kate Ceberano chronology
Brave (1989)	Like Now (1990)	Think About It! (1991)

Singles from Like Now
- 1. "Dindi" Released: August 1990

Like Now is a studio album by Australian singer Kate Ceberano and her Sextet, and released in August 1990. It was Ceberano's second jazz album, following her 1987 live album Kate Ceberano and her Septet; but unlike that album, this was recorded in a studio. It peaked at No. 18 in Australia.

Ceberano won the award for Best Female Jazz Performer at the 1991 Mo Awards.

== Background ==
Following the major success of her 1989 pop album Brave, Ceberano returned to the studio and recorded a jazz album with her sextet.

"Dindi" was released as the only single from the album in August 1990. The song peaked at number 158 on the ARIA Chart.

== Critical reception ==
On 19 October 1990, Adrian Jackson, the director of the Wangaratta Jazz Festival gave the album a positive review in the Business Review Weekly saying; "On her first jazz recording Kate Ceberano and her Septet, she proved that she had a good voice and knew how to swing and have fun. Here, she takes the next step. Not only does she sparkle on songs such as 'Tight' and 'Talk to me Baby', she also sounds as if she knows what she's doing talking about on numbers such as 'You're Blasé', 'Save You Love for Me' and 'Tryin' Times'. Some purists might harbour doubts about Ceberano's credibility as a jazz singer, but this album dispels them. Apart from the vocals, it also offers strong contributions from her band, including some brilliant piano from Jex Saarelaht".

== Track listing ==
No.	Title	Writer(s)	Length
1.	"Like Now"	Russell Smith, Jex Saarelaht	3:37
2.	"Talk to Me Baby"	Robert E. Dolan, Johnny Mercer	3:07
3.	"Save Your Love for Me"	Buddy Johnson	3:41
4.	"Pent-Up House"	Sonny Rollins, Jex Saarelaht	3:42
5.	"Tight"	Betty Carter	2:27
6.	"You're Blasé"	Bruce Sievier, Ord Hamilton	3:55
7.	"Catalonian Knights"	Russell Smith, Dexter Gordon	5:15
8.	"Samba Minha"	Doug DeVries, Jex Saarelaht	4:07
9.	"My One and Only Love"	Robert Mellin, Guy Wood	7:00
10.	"Kate's Blues"	Kate Ceberano, Jex Saarelaht	4:10
11.	"Dindi"	Antônio Carlos Jobim	4:23
12.	"Tryin' Times"	Donny Hathaway, Leroy Hutson	4:47

- The album was dedicated to the late Dexter Gordon and the late Sarah Vaughan.

== Charts ==
Like Now debuted at No. 47, before peaking at No. 18 in September 1990.

Chart (1990)	Peak position
Australian Albums (ARIA)	18

== Credits ==
- Produced by Jex Saarelaht, Kate Ceberano, Peter Jones, Philip Ceberano, Robert Burke, Russell Smith and Stuart Speed
- Arranged by Peter De Visser
- Engineered by Frank Andrewartha (tracks 8, 10 and 12), Peter McLean (tracks 1–7, 9 and 11), Tony Tosti (tracks 8 and 10)

=== Musicians ===
- Bass: Stuart Speed
- Drums: Peter Jones
- Guitar: Doug DeVries and Philip Ceberano
- Percussion: Dennis Close
- Piano: Jex Saarelaht
- Saxophone, Flute: Robert Burke
- Strings: Cindy Watkin, David Shafer, Fintan Murphy, Jacqui Johnson, Laurence Jacks, Lorraine Hook, Ron Layton, Rudolf Osadnik and Siobhan Statkiewicz
- Trumpet, trombone: Russell Smith
