= Merry Christmas (Kate Ceberano album) =

Studio album by Kate Ceberano
- Released: 13 November 2009
- Recorded: 2009
- Genre: Pop, Christmas
- Length: 43:30
- Label: Universal Music Australia
- Producer: Chong Lim

Kate Ceberano chronology
Dallas et Kate (2009)	Merry Christmas (2009)	Kensal Road (2013)

Singles from Merry Christmas
- 1. "It's Only Christmas" Released: 11 December 2009

Merry Christmas is the first Christmas album recorded by Australian recording artist Kate Ceberano and was certified Gold by ARIA. The album includes a duet with Ronan Keating.

== Track listing ==
Merry Christmas features 12 tracks, 11 Christmas classics and "Radiate", which originally featured on her previous album Dallas et Kate. "Radiate" was composed by Dallas Cosmas and Ceberano.

1. "White Christmas" – 3:26
2. "Feliz Navidad" – 3:14
3. "Jingle Bell Rock" – 3:34
4. "Santa Baby" – 3:24
5. "I Saw Mommy Kissing Santa Claus" – 3:05
6. "Have Yourself a Merry Little Christmas" – 4:12
7. "Santa Claus Is Coming to Town" – 2:35
8. "Jingle Bells" – 2:54
9. "The Christmas Song" – 4:22
10. "Blue Christmas" – 3:28
11. "Happy Christmas (War Is Over)" – 5:52
12. "It's Only Christmas" (edit) with Ronan Keating – 3:24
13. "Radiate" – 3:13

The album was re-released on 12 November 2010: this edition removed "Radiate" and added three new tracks, including a duet with David Campbell and one with Jimmy Little.

13. "Baby, It's Cold Outside" with David Campbell – 2:52
14. "Emmanuel / Oh Holy Night" – 4:55
15. "I Remember" with Jimmy Little – 3:50

== Critical reception ==
Reviews for Merry Christmas were generally positive. Thomas' music reviewer said, "Get ready to be wowed and well and truly in the Christmas spirit with the exceptional new Christmas album from Australia's much loved and award winning Kate Ceberano! Kate has added her charms to a new level of 'Christmas album', featuring classics with a twist, that only Kate could deliver". Beauty and Lace said, "Kate Ceberano’s Merry Christmas contains classics that everyone is familiar with, twisted to suit Kate’s style. It has a very upbeat and jazzy feel to it that will get your toes tapping and have you singing along before you even realise".

== Charts ==
=== Weekly charts ===
Merry Christmas debuted at number 33 before peaking at 17 in the week commencing 27 December 2009. It re-entered in December 2010, peaking at 35 for the chart issued 26 December 2010.

Chart (2009–2011)	Peak position
Australian Albums (ARIA)	17

== Certifications ==
Region	Certification	Certified units/sales
Australia (ARIA)	Gold	35,000^{^}
^{^} Shipments figures based on certification alone.

== Credits ==
Credits adapted from the album sleeve

- Gregg Spence - trumpet
- Jordan Murray - trombone
- Angus Burchall - drums, percussion
- Chong Lim - piano, keyboards
- Kate Ceberano - background vocals
- Lachlan Davidson - saxophone
- Michelle Serret - background vocals
- Rod Davies, Stuart Fraser - guitar
