= That's What I Call Love =

Single by Kate Ceberano

from the album Brave / She-Devil
- A-side: "That's What I Call love"
- B-side: "Catalonian Knights"
- Released: 18 February 1990
- Genre: Pop, Electronic, Synth pop
- Label: Festival/ London Records
- Songwriters: Ashley Cadell, Kate Ceberano
- Producer: Simon Climie

Kate Ceberano singles chronology
"Young Boys Are My Weakness" (1989)	"That's What I Call Love" (1990)	"Dindi" (1990)

"That's What I Call Love" is a 1989 song by Australian singer Kate Ceberano. It was released as the fourth and final single from her third solo album, Brave. It was also included on the She-Devil soundtrack. It was released in February 1990 and peaked at 30 in Australia in April 1990.

== Track listing ==
CD Single/ Vinyl (K1027)

1. "That's What I Call Love" - 4:02
2. "Catalonian Knights" (Kate Ceberano And Her Sextet) - 5:32

== Charts ==
=== Weekly charts ===
Chart (1990)	Peak position
ARIA Singles Chart	30
