= My One and Only Love =

1953 song by Guy Wood and Robert Mellin

Song
- Written: 1952
- Published: 1953 by Sherwin Music
- Composer: Guy Wood
- Lyricist: Robert Mellin

"My One and Only Love" is a 1953 popular song with music written by Guy Wood and lyrics by Robert Mellin. Notable renditions by Frank Sinatra (1953), and later by John Coltrane and Johnny Hartman (1963), have made the song part of the jazz standard musical repertoire.

== Structure ==
Published in 1953, it is a conventional 32-bar song with four 8-bar sections, including a bridge ("Type A" or "AABA" song structure). Typically performed as a ballad, it has an aria-like melody that is a challenge to many vocalists; in the key of C, the song's melody extends from G below middle C to the second D above middle C.

== History ==
The song originated in 1947 under the title "Music from Beyond the Moon", with music by Guy B. Wood and lyrics by Jack Lawrence. Vocalist Vic Damone recorded this version in the same year and released it as a B-side to "I'll Always Be In Love With You" (Mercury 5072), but it was unsuccessful. In 1952, Robert Mellin wrote a new title and lyrics for the song, and it was republished the next year as “My One and Only Love”.

== Jazz standard ==
When Frank Sinatra recorded it in 1953 with Nelson Riddle, first released as B-side to his hit single "I've Got the World on a String" (Capitol 2505), it became known as a jazz standard. Then popular saxophonist Charlie Ventura saw the song's "jazz potential" and recorded the first instrumental version in the very same year.

As an instrumental jazz standard, it remained predominantly a song for tenor saxophonists. Ben Webster recorded the tune with Art Tatum in autumn 1956 and [Coleman Hawkins] with [Hank Jones] in 1958. John Coltrane recorded his version with vocalist Johnny Hartman ten years after Ventura in 1963 (John Coltrane and Johnny Hartman). This was followed by Sonny Rollins in 1964. He re-recorded it in 1977, this time on soprano saxophone. Later interpretations came from Chico Freeman, Michael Brecker, and Joshua Redman.

Vocal renditions of "My One and Only Love" were recorded by Ella Fitzgerald (Decca 29746), Johnny Mathis, Doris Day, Mark Murphy, Chet Baker and Kurt Elling. Cassandra Wilson turned the song into an up-tempo swing number.

== Cover versions ==
Date	Performer	Type	Album, notes	Source
1947	Vic Damone	vocal	single, B-side, as "Music from Beyond the Moon"	
1948	Tony Martin	vocal	single, as "Music from Beyond the Moon"	
1953	Frank Sinatra	vocal	single, B-side; appears on later compilation This Is Sinatra!	
1953	Charlie Ventura	instrumental	Charlie Ventura's Open House	
1954	Art Tatum and Ben Webster		The Tatum Group Masterpieces, Volume Eight	
1955	Ella Fitzgerald	vocal	single	
1955	Sarah Vaughan	vocal	The Divine Sarah	
1957	Pepper Adams	instrumental	Pepper Adams Quintet	
1957	Carmen McRae	vocal	By Special Request	
1957	Horace Silver	instrumental	The Stylings of Silver	
1958	Johnny Mathis	vocal	Warm	
1959	Henry Mancini	instrumental	The Mancini Touch	
1960	Magni Wentzel	vocal	single	
1960	Frank Sinatra	vocal	during the Nice 'n' Easy sessions	
1960	Jimmy Smith	instrumental	Plain Talk	
1961	Dion	vocal	Alone with Dion	
1962	Dean Martin	vocal	Cha Cha de Amor	
1962	Ella Fitzgerald	instrumental	Ella Swings Gently with Nelson	
1962	Doris Day	vocal	Duet	
1962	Andy Williams	vocal	Warm and Willing	
1962	Grant Green	instrumental	Born to Be Blue	
1963	John Coltrane and Johnny Hartman	vocal	John Coltrane and Johnny Hartman	
1964	Oscar Peterson	instrumental	We Get Requests	
1965	Sonny Rollins	instrumental	The Complete RCA Victor Recordings	
1965	Nancy Wilson	vocal	Gentle Is My Love	
1965	Wes Montgomery	instrumental	Bumpin'	
1966	Joe Zawinul	instrumental	Money in the Pocket	
1968	Chick Corea	instrumental	Now He Sings, Now He Sobs	
1970	Louis Armstrong	vocal	Louis Armstrong and His Friends	
1973	MFSB	instrumental	Love Is the Message	
1974	McCoy Tyner	instrumental	Atlantis	
1977	Sonny Rollins	instrumental	Easy Living	
1977	Radka Toneff	vocal	Butterfly	
1978	Chico Freeman	instrumental	Beyond the Rain	
1981	Joe Henderson & Chick Corea	instrumental	Relaxin' At Camarillo	
1987	Michael Brecker	instrumental	Michael Brecker	
1988	Cassandra Wilson	vocal	Blue Skies	
1989	Chet Baker	vocal	Chet Baker Sings and Plays from the Film Let's Get Lost	
1989	Chick Corea	instrumental	Chick Corea Akoustic Band	
1990	Kate Ceberano	vocal	Like Now	
1991	Rickie Lee Jones	vocal	Pop Pop	
1992	Ray Bryant	instrumental	Plays Blues and Ballads	
1993	Joe Sample	instrumental	Invitation	
1993	Diane Schuur	vocal	Love Songs	
1995	Joshua Redman	instrumental	Spirit of the Moment - Live at the Village Vanguard	
1995	Sting	vocal	Leaving Las Vegas (soundtrack)	
1996	Buddy Rich	instrumental	Rich and Famous	
1998	Fred Hersch & Bill Frisell	instrumental	Songs We Know	
2001	Mark Murphy	vocal	Once to Every Heart	
2005	Rod Stewart	vocal	Thanks for the Memory: The Great American Songbook, Volume IV	
2005	Chris Botti with Paula Cole	vocal	To Love Again: The Duets	
2008	Yo-Yo Ma	instrumental	Songs of Joy & Peace	
2008	Irvin Mayfield and Ellis Marsalis	instrumental	Love Song, Ballads, and Standards	
2009	Mark Isham and Kate Ceberano	vocal	Bittersweet	
2009	Kurt Elling	vocal	Dedicated to You: Kurt Elling Sings the Music of Coltrane and Hartman	
2011	George Benson	vocal	Guitar Man	
2011	Doris Day	vocal	My Heart	
2012	Paul McCartney	vocal	Kisses on the Bottom	
2014	Jamie Cullum	vocal	Interlude	
2017	Bob Dylan	vocal	Triplicate	
2020	VARITDA	vocal	Mood	
2025	Emmet Cohen Trio w/ Patrick Bartley	Instrumental	Emmet's Place Vol. 128	
