= Bittersweet (Mark Isham and Kate Ceberano album) =

Studio album by Mark Isham and Kate Ceberano
- Released: 10 April 2009
- Recorded: Mad Hatter Studios, Los Angeles, 2009
- Genre: Jazz, easy listening
- Label: Universal Music Australia
- Producer: Mark Isham

Kate Ceberano albums chronology
So Much Beauty (2008)	Bittersweet (2009)	Dallas et Kate (2009)

Bittersweet is an album of jazz standards by American musician Mark Isham and Australian vocalist Kate Ceberano. It is Ceberano's first jazz album in twenty years. The album received a nomination for Best Jazz Album at the 2009 ARIA Awards.

Isham and Ceberano performed at the Sundance Film Festival in 2003 and wanted to record an album together. In early 2009, Ceberano flew to Isham's estate outside Los Angeles and recorded the album in his home studio. The pair recorded the album live without overdubs in just three days.

== Track listing ==
#	Title	Original performer	Duration
1	"My One and Only Love"	Frank Sinatra	4:29
2	"Skylark"	Anita O'Day	4:10
3	"In a Sentimental Mood"	Duke Ellington	4:57
4	"Don't Get Around Much Anymore"	Duke Ellington	4:24
5	"In My Solitude"	Paul Robeson	4:31
6	"Night and Day"	Cole Porter	5:05
7	"I Wanna Be Loved"	The Andrews Sisters	6:48
8	"Easy Living"	Ralph Rainger	4:17
9	"Lush Life"	Billy Strayhorn	4:18
10	"Do It Again"	Irène Bordoni	4:13
11	"Every Time We Say Good Bye"	Cole Porter	5:12

== Personnel ==
- Kate Ceberano – vocals
- Mark Isham – trumpet, flugelhorn
- Alan Pasqua – piano
- Tom Warrington – bass
- Peter Erskine – drums

== Charts ==
Chart (2009)	Peak position
Australian Albums (ARIA)	80
