= Kate Ceberano and Her Septet =

Live album by Kate Ceberano
- Released: March 1987
- Recorded: 13–14 June 1986, Melbourne
- Genre: Jazz, blues, pop
- Length: 54:17
- Label: Regular, Festival

Kate Ceberano chronology
Kate Ceberano and Her Septet (1987)	You've Always Got the Blues (with Wendy Matthews (1988)

Singles from Kate Ceberano and Her Septet
- 1. "I'm Beginning to See the Light" Released: February 1987

Kate Ceberano and Her Septet is a live album recorded by Australian singer Kate Ceberano, released in March 1987. Ceberano's first solo release, the album peaked at number 29 in Australia.

== Background ==
Whilst still performing with the band I'm Talking in early 1986, Ceberano was asked by events promoter Clifford Hocking to step in and replace a cancelled jazz performer at the Perth International Jazz Festival with a week's notice. Ceberano quickly established a septet and the performance was an unexpected success. Immediately after, Hocking asked Ceberano to perform again at the ANZ Pavilion State Theatre in Melbourne between 13–14 June 1986. According to her 2014 autobiography, Ceberano said the idea "frightened the life out [of her]" as she thought no one would come. However, the performance was a success and the live recording was released as her debut album in 1987.

There was a TV special released, and although not officially released, various clips are available to view on YouTube.

== Track listing ==
No.	Title	Writer(s)	Original artist	Length
1.	"I'm Beginning to See the Light"	Don George, Duke Ellington, Harry James & Johnny Hodges	Ella Fitzgerald (1944)	2:30
2.	"My Baby Just Cares for Me"	Gus Khan & Walter Donaldson	Eddie Cantor (1930)	3:54
3.	"Midnight Sun"	Johnny Mercer, Lionel Hampton & Sonny Burke	Lionel Hampton Orchestra (1947)	3:28
4.	"Love Me or Leave Me" (with Stuart Speed)	Gus Khan & Walter Donaldson	Ruth Etting (1928)	4:57
5.	"Ill Wind"	Harold Arlen & Ted Koehler	Adelaide Hall (1934)	3:10
6.	"Memory Serves"	Bill Laswell & Michael Beinhorn	Material (1981)	5:31
7.	"Two Sleepy People" (with Phillip Ceberano)	Frank Loesser & Hoagy Carmichael	Hoagy Carmichael (1938)	3:47
8.	"Heart"	Jerry Ross & Richard Adler	Eddie Fisher (1955)	2:44
9.	"I'm Hip"	Bob Dorough & Dave Frishberg	Broken Bells & Bill Takas (1976)	2:44
10.	"Lush Life"	Billy Strayhorn	Billy Strayhorn (1938)	6:17
11.	"One Note Samba"	Antônio Carlos Jobim & Newton Mendonça	João Gilberto (1960)	2:41
12.	"And the Angels Sing"	Jonny Mercer & Ziggy Elman	Martha Tilton (1944)	2:24
13.	"The Masquerade Is Over"	Allie Wrubel & Herbert Magidson	Allie Wrubel	6:06
14.	"Yeah Yeah" (with Russell Smith)	Georgie Fame	Mongo Santamaría (1963)	4:29
Total length:				54:17

== Singles ==
- "I'm Beginning to See the Light" was released as the first and only single from the album in 1987.

It was released as a 2-Track single.

Side A "I'm Beginning to See the Light"
Side B "Lush Life"

== Release history ==
Country	Date	Format	Label
Australia	1987	Vinyl, Cassette	Festival Records
Australia	May 1989	CD	Festival Records
Australia		Digital Download	Festival Records

== Charts ==
Chart (1987)	Peak position
Australia (Kent Music Report)	29

== Certification ==
Region	Certification	Certified units/sales
Australia (ARIA)	Gold	35,000^{^}
^{^} Shipments figures based on certification alone.

== Credits ==
- Bass – Stuart Speed
- Drums – Peter Jones
- Engineer – Ross Cockle
- Guitar – Philip Ceberano
- Piano, Arranged By – Jex Saarelaht
- Saxophone – Robert Burke
- Trombone – Russell Smith
- Vibraphone [Vibes], Percussion – Alex Pertout
