= The Dangerous Age (album) =

Studio album by Kate Ceberano and Steve Kilbey and Sean Sennett
- Released: 31 January 2020
- Length: 42:00
- Label: Self-released
- Producer: Kate Ceberano; Rod Bustos

Kate Ceberano chronology
Tryst (2019)	The Dangerous Age (2020)	Sweet Inspiration (2020)

Singles from The Dangerous Age
- 1. "Monument City Lights, 1973" Released: 23 August 2019; 2. "My Restless Heart" Released: 23 October 2019; 3. "All Tied Up" Released: 19 November 2019

The Dangerous Age is a collaborative studio album by Australian recording artists Kate Ceberano, Steve Kilbey and Sean Sennett, released on 31 January 2020.

Ceberano recorded the album with her co-producer Rod Bustos in Melbourne. Kilbey and Sennett added their parts in Sydney and Brisbane. The album was mixed by Jason Millhouse in Brisbane.

In a statement, Sean Sennett said "working with Kate and Steve has been a thrill. Ceberano and Kilbey were big figures in the culture when I was growing up... To have sat with Kate in her studio jamming while we were writing 'Not the Loving Kind', or to be hitting lyric lines back and forth with Steve during the writing of 'Monument City Lights, 1973' was a fantastic experience for me".

The cover portrait for The Dangerous Age was shot by Justine Walpole who is best known for her work with Prince.

== Critical reception ==
Professional ratings
Review scores
Source	Rating
Forté Magazine	4.5/5 stars

Tammy Walters from Forté Magazine called the album "pure gold" saying "The Dangerous Age is a blend of each artist's personalities and stylistic backgrounds" with "Different background aside, the trio mould into one another like wet concrete, but the chemistry sets them into solid gold." Noel Mengel from Music Trust said "Sparks don't always fly when different songwriters work together. But they certainly do here." Mengel added "The most remarkable thing about it isn't how much it reminds the listener of where these writers have been before as how it so often takes them somewhere new." Jeff Jenkins from Stack called the album "adventurous and inviting" and said "Ceberano takes the lead, and her vocal is pop perfection, while Kilbey's voice has undeniable presence. They complement each other brilliantly, bringing these hypnotic tales to life. An unlikely combination, but a triumph."

== Commercial performance ==
The album did not chart on the ARIA Charts top 100, but peaked at number 6 on the AIR chart.

== Track listing ==
The Dangerous Age track listing
No.	Title	Writer(s)	Length
1.	"All Tied Up"	Kate Ceberano, Sean Sennett, Steve Kilbey	4:23
2.	"Monument City Lights 1973"	Ceberano, Sennett, Kilbey	4:17
3.	"On Love"	Ceberano, Sennett, Kilbey	3:51
4.	"The Dangerous Age"	Ceberano, Sennett, Kilbey	2:51
5.	"Shot from Memory"	Ceberano, Sennett, Kilbey	3:15
6.	"My Restless Heart"	Ceberano, Sennett	3:17
7.	"Girl On the Highwire"	Ceberano, Sennett, Kilbey	3:08
8.	"So Long Ago"	Ceberano, Sennett	2:58
9.	"Not the Loving Kind"	Ceberano, Sennett	2:59
10.	"The Losing Game"	Ceberano, Sennett	4:09
11.	"Glacial Speed"	Ceberano, Sennett, Kilbey	4:09
12.	"Whatever Happened to Steven Valentine?"	Amanda Kramer, Sennett, Kilbey	3:07

== Personnel ==
- Kate Ceberano – vocals
- Steve Kilbey – vocals
- Sean Sennett – vocals
- Rod Bustos – acoustic guitar, electric guitars, slide guitar, synth bass, table, drum programming, piano, synthesisers, glockenspiel
- Jason Millhouse – guitar
- John Salerno – drums
- Paul Cecchinelli – piano, keys, cello
- Alison Ainsworth – backing vocals

== Release history ==
Release formats for The Dangerous Age
Territory	Date	Format	Label	Catalogue
Australia	31 January 2020	CD; digital download; streaming	Universal Music Australia	0851550
Australia	31 July 2020	LP (limited to 275 copies)	Universal Music Australia	0851551
Australia	29 September 2023	LP (white re-issue)	Universal Music Australia	4896930

== See also ==
- List of 2020 albums
