= Think About It! =

Studio album by Kate Ceberano
- Released: September 1991
- Studio: Melbourne, New York
- Genre: Pop, electronic, house
- Length: 41:03
- Label: Regular, Festival
- Producer: Andres Levin, Arthur Baker, Ashley Cadell, Camus Mare Celli

Kate Ceberano chronology
| Like Now (1990) | Think About It! (1991) | Jesus Christ Superstar (1992) |

Singles from Think About It!
- 1. "Every Little Thing" Released: July 1991; 2. "Satisfied" Released: September 1991; 3. "See Right Through" Released: November 1991

Think About It! is a 1991 album by recording artist Kate Ceberano. It is her first pop album after her highly successful 1989 album Brave. The album spawned three singles; with "See Right Through" being the most successful, peaking at number 33 in Australia in December 1991.

== Critical reception ==
On 14 November 1991, Shane Danielsen of The Sydney Morning Herald said the album is "bright, slickly produced and essentially appealing, but hardly likely to inspire any revolutions".

== Track listing ==
The album was released on CD, Cassette and vinyl LP.

| No. | Title | Writer(s) | Length |
|---|---|---|---|
| 1. | "Every Little Thing" | Ashley Cadell | 3:47 |
| 2. | "Think About It" | Julien Lodge, Kate Ceberano | 4:20 |
| 3. | "See Right Through" | Kate Ceberano, Rob Burke | 4:08 |
| 4. | "Satisfied" | Ashley Cadell | 4:57 |
| 5. | "The Message" | Andres Levin, Camus Celli, Chris Max | 5:13 |
| 6. | "What Am I Gonna Do" | Alexander Nettlebeck, Kate Ceberano, Phil Ceberano | 5:14 |
| 7. | "Call Me Yours" | Kate Ceberano, Rob Burke | 4:41 |
| 8. | "So Fine" | Ashley Cadell, Kate Ceberano | 4:02 |
| 9. | "Meaning of Life" | Arthur Baker, Eric Kupper, Kate Ceberano | 4:59 |
| 10. | "Everything Will Be Alright" | Ashley Cadell | 4:46 |
| Total length: | | | 41:03 |

== Charts ==
| Chart (1991) | Peak position |
|---|---|
| Australian Albums (ARIA) | 24 |
