= Blue Box (album) =

Studio album by Kate Ceberano
- Released: 1996
- Recorded: 1993–96; New York, Los Angeles, London, Sydney
- Genre: Pop, R&B, soul
- Length: 62:40
- Label: Mushroom
- Producer: Alan Friedman, Ashley Cadell, Fred Maher, Kate Ceberano, Mark Goldenberg and Mike Shipley

Kate Ceberano chronology
Kate Ceberano and Friends (1994)	Blue Box (1996)	Pash (1997)

Singles from Blue Box
- 1. "All I Want Is You" Released: June 1994; 2. "Change" Released: November 1995; 3. "Love and Affection" Released: June 1996; 4. "Blue Box" Released: 1996

Blue Box is a studio album released by Australian recording artist Kate Ceberano in 1996. The album peaked at number 18 on the ARIA Charts. The album's second single, "Change" was nominated for two ARIA Awards in 1996.

== Background and recording ==
Following the success of the 1992 Australian leg of Jesus Christ Superstar, Ceberano was inundated with interest from various record labels. She elected to go with Elektra Records and moved to New York to record an album with producer Fred Maher. On the eve of delivering the album to the label, Elekra records named Sylvia Rhone as its chairman and CEO. Rhone sacked seventy-eight artists (including Ceberano) as she wanted to turn the Elektra into a hip hop label and Ceberano's album was scrapped. Some of these songs appeared on Blue Box.

Ceberano returned to Australia where she filmed the TV show and recorded the album Kate Ceberano and Friends, which was released in January 1994. Ceberano hired Richard East as her manager and they signed with Mushroom Records to record a new album. Ceberano and East travelled to London to write and record and whilst East was stayed in London to work on the musical Mamma Mia!, Ceberano travelled to Los Angeles and worked with Mark Goldenberg on a number of songs. Mushroom Records eventually released the album in 1996, which consisted of songs from all of these recording sessions. In her 2014 autobiography, Ceberano said "I'm not sure how the [new] material sat with the Globe songs. After all the arguing, with myself and with other people, over what kind of singer I was, whether I was a jazz singer or a pop singer, Blue Box gave me the confidence to think of myself simply as a singer".

== Track listing ==
No.	Title	Writer(s)	Length
1.	"Change"	M Jolly, A Jolly & B Harris	3:59
2.	"Blue Box"	K Ceberano, Mark Goldenberg & Mike Shipley	6:49
3.	"Love and Affection"	Joan Armatrading	4:06
4.	"The Rules"	Allen Friedman, Fred Maher & K Ceberano	6:22
5.	"Living with Lies"	Allen Friedman, Fred Maher & K Ceberano	4:38
6.	"Looking at You"	Dave Cole, Allen Friedman, Fred Maher & K Ceberano	5:51
7.	"All That I Want Is You"	Kate Ceberano	4:20
8.	"One Small Request"	Allen Friedman, Fred Maher & K Ceberano	4:51
9.	"Something That You Really Need"	Allen Friedman, Fred Maher & K Ceberano	4:29
10.	"Around This Time of Day"	K Ceberano, Glen Reither, & Paul Gildea	3:45
11.	"Mantra"	K. Ceberano, Kevin McCormick, Mark Goldenberg & Mike Shipley	5:20
12.	"Save Your Love for Me"	Buddy Johnson	4:22
13.	"Brilliant Lies" (Taken from the film, Brilliant Lies)	Nerida Tyson-Chew, Rajan Kamahl & Richard Franklin	3:56
Total length:			62:40

== Charts ==
Chart (1996)	Peak position
Australian Albums (ARIA)	18

== Awards ==
Ceberano was nominated for two ARIA Music Awards at the 1996 ceremony.

Year	Nominee / work	Award	Result
1996	"Change"	Best Female Artist	Nominated
1996	"Change"	Best Adult Contemporary Album	Nominated
