= Young Boys Are My Weakness =

"Young Boys Are My Weakness" / "Brave"

Single by Kate Ceberano

from the album Brave
- A-side: "Young Boys Are My Weakness/Brave"
- B-side: "Higher Ground"
- Released: July 1989 (UK); October 1989 (Australia)
- Genre: Pop, funk, soul
- Label: Festival; London
- Songwriters: Ronald La Pread; William King
- Producers: Phil Harding; Ian Curnow; Ashley Cadell

Kate Ceberano singles chronology
"Love Dimension" (1989)	"Young Boys Are My Weakness" / "Brave" (1989)	"That's What I Call Love" (1990)

Alternative cover

"Young Boys Are My Weakness" is a 1989 song by Australian singer Kate Ceberano. It was released as her debut solo single in the UK in July 1989, and in Australia as the third single from her third solo album, Brave. It was released in October 1989 on the Festival Records label in Australia and on London Records internationally. The song is a slightly re-worded cover version of The Commodores' 1974 song "Young Girls Are My Weakness", taken from their album Machine Gun.

The song, along with album track "Obsession", was recorded with Phil Harding and Ian Curnow at PWL Studios, with Harding recalling, "for us to work with such a great singer was an unusual treat."

In Australia, it was released as a double A-sided single with "Brave".

It spent fifteen weeks in the top 50 and peaked at No. 15 on the Australian singles chart, and No. 98 in the United Kingdom. This is Ceberano's only song to make the top 100 in the United Kingdom.

Ceberano now refuses to perform the song, due to its controversial lyrics — feeling her present age now makes it inappropriate.

== Track listing ==
European 7" single and cassette single
No.	Title	Writer(s)	Producer(s)	Length
1.	"Young Boys Are My Weakness"	Ronald La Pread and William King	Phil Harding, Ian Curnow	3:24
2.	"Higher Ground"	Stevie Wonder	Ashley Cadell	3:38

European CD Maxi
No.	Title	Writer(s)	Producer(s)	Length
1.	"Young Boys Are My Weakness"	Ronald La Pread and William King	Phil Harding, Ian Curnow	3:24
2.	"Young Boys Are My Weakness" (extended version)	Ronald La Pread and William King	Phil Harding, Ian Curnow (remixers)	7:10
3.	"Higher Ground"	Stevie Wonder	Ashley Cadell	5:33

Australian 7" vinyl
No.	Title	Writer(s)	Producer(s)	Length
1.	"Brave"	Kate Ceberano, Philip Ceberano	Nick Launay	5:32
2.	"Young Boys Are My Weakness"	Ronald La Pread and William King	Phil Harding, Ian Curnow	3:24

Australian 12" vinyl
No.	Title	Writer(s)	Producer(s)	Length
1.	"Young Boys Are My Weakness"	Ronald La Pread and William King	Phil Harding, Ian Curnow	3:24
2.	"Brave"	Kate Ceberano, Philip Ceberano	Nick Launay	5:32
3.	"Young Boys Are My Weakness" (Blacksmith Remix)	Ronald La Pread and William King	Phil Harding, Ian Curnow

== Charts ==
=== Weekly charts ===
Chart (1989)	Peak position
Australian Singles Chart	15
UK Singles Chart	98
