= Kensal Road =

Studio album by Kate Ceberano
- Released: 26 July 2013
- Recorded: Kensaltown Studios, London, 2013
- Genres: Pop; rock; folk
- Length: 41:02
- Label: Sony Music Australia
- Producers: Steve Scanlon; Ben Balfour

Kate Ceberano chronology
Merry Christmas (2009)	Kensal Road (2013)	Lullaby (2015)

Singles from Kensal Road
- 1. "Magnet" Released: 31 May 2013

Kensal Road is a studio album by Australian recording artist Kate Ceberano that was released on 26 July 2013.

== Background ==
Kensal Road was recorded in the United Kingdom with songwriter/producer James Bryan and marks Kate Ceberano's first recordings of original material since The Girl Can Help It in 2003. It contains elements of Ceberano's original pop sound and was announced Kensal Road as "a new chapter" in Ceberano's musical career.

Ceberano said about the album: "I think it's one of my favourite albums because of the elements that went into making it, working with some amazing European musicians, having the creative control and the support of Sony Music Australia. Rather than me having to go to them and say I want to do this they said 'we're ready for you to do this now' and that is a beautiful reversal of flow if you know what I mean."

Musically, Kensal Road incorporates Kate's early musical influences of Hawaiian folk music and Fleetwood Mac, but was also created to reflect the genres of nu-folk and nu-country, being influenced by such singer/songwriters as Mumford & Sons, Laura Marling and Ryan Adams.

== Singles ==
- "Magnet" was released as the first single on 31 May 2013. A video was released via Ceberano's Vevo account on 7 October 2013.
- A video for "How High" was released on 12 November 2013.

== Critical reception ==
Tex Miller of Forte Magazine gave the album a positive review, saying: "Straight off the bat, you are greeted with sweet vocal harmonies and some country-esque pop guitar lines that features ukulele, mandolin and guitar to name just a few of the instruments that James Bryan has played." He admitted not previously being a fan of Ceberano, but continued by adding: "If you've previously been sceptical of Kate Ceberano, give this a listen, it will change your tune."

== Track listing ==
The album was released digitally and physically in Australia on 26 July 2013.

No.	Title	Writer(s)	Length
1.	"Garden State"	James Bryan, Kate Ceberano	3:32
2.	"You and I" (featuring Jeremy Lister)	James Bryan, Jeremy Lister	3:16
3.	"So Far From Home"	James Bryan, Kate Ceberano	3:36
4.	"Champion"	James Bryan, Kate Ceberano	3:50
5.	"Have It All"	Ian Barter, Kate Ceberano	3:53
6.	"Magnet"	James Bryan, Yuna Zarai	3:49
7.	"Louis' Song"	Kate Ceberano, Paul Cecchinelli	4:25
8.	"My Heavy Heart"	Kyle Ryan Hurlbut, Sarah Siskind	3:22
9.	"Jez"	James Bryan, Kate Ceberano	3:42
10.	"How High"	James Bryan, Kate Ceberano	3:38
11.	"The Little Things"	Dallas Cosmas, Kate Ceberano	4:18

== Charts ==
Chart (2013)	Peak position
Australian Albums (ARIA)	23

== Tour ==
To promote the album, Ceberano toured Australia throughout October and November 2013. She played the drums in this tour. The support act was Alison Ainsworth, a Triple J Unearthed feature singer and songwriter from Melbourne.

The tour received positive reviews, including one from Gen Adams of Weekend Notes, who said: "Past hits like 'Brave', 'Pash' and 'I Don't Know How To Love Him' were popular. Her new songs were listened to with delight as she sang them faultlessly and passionately. In between songs, her banter with the audience was genuine and her fun-loving and bubbly personality exuded love and comfort. Her years of experience and professionalism brought a natural feel to the stage. Audience participation was welcomed and this made the crowds feel like they were part of Kate's extended family. We were invited to join in with choruses, singing rhythms and clapping beats".

Tour dates:

Date	Location	Venue
2 October 2013	Albany	Albany Entertainment Centre
3 October 2013	Bunbury	Bunbury Entertainment Centre
4 October 2013	Mandurah	Mandurah Performing Arts Centre
5 October 2013	Perth	Regal Theatre Perth
10 October 2013	Port Pirie	Northern Festival Centre
11 October 2013	Adelaide	Her Majesty's Theatre Adelaide
18 October 2013	Coolangatta	Twin Towns
20 October 2013	Brisbane	Brisbane Powerhouse
24 October 2013	Geelong	Geelong Playhouse
26 October 2013	Melbourne	The Palms at Crown
30 October 2013	Canberra	Canberra Southern Cross Club
31 October 2013	Wollongong	Illawarra Performing Arts Centre
1 November 2013	Newcastle	Wests New Lambton Theatre
2 November 2013	Sydney	York Theatre
3 November 2013	Penrith	Evan Theatre
