= Pash (album) =

Studio album by Kate Ceberano
- Released: 1 May 1998
- Genre: Pop
- Length: 51:23
- Label: Festival Mushroom

Kate Ceberano chronology
Blue Box (1996)	Pash (1998)	True Romantic: The Best Of (1999)

Singles from Pash
- 1. "Pash" Released: December 1997; 2. "Love is Alive" Released: April 1998; 3. "Time to Think" Released: July 1998

Pash is an album released by Australian recording artist Kate Ceberano in May 1998.

Ceberano stated in her 2014 autobiography that the album Pash is "naked, unabashed pop" but the most personal album she has ever made: "It had taken me fifteen years to get to the point where I was confident enough to make decisions and to see them through. Before Pash I had been too willing to let others make the decisions for me, even when it was my band and my face on the album cover. I didn't trust my own instincts as an artist. Pash was the artistic breakthrough I needed. I wrote or co-wrote all the tracks".

Ceberano explains that she wrote the song "Courage" with Mark Goldenberg as a wedding present for her mother. She was inspired by her mother's statement, "I can't believe I've found a man who has the courage to love me".

== Track listing ==
No.	Title	Writer(s)	Length
1.	"Pash"	Kate Ceberano and Mark Goldenberg	4:21
2.	"Trying Too Hard"	Ceberano and Daniel Knight	3:58
3.	"Love Is Alive"	Ceberano and Goldenberg	4:17
4.	"Time to Think"	Ceberano and Chas Jankel	4:35
5.	"Mary Magdalene"	Ceberano and Pete Glenister	4:32
6.	"There's No Feeling"	Andy Wright and Ceberano	4:27
7.	"Don't Come Around"	Ceberano and Glenister	4:41
8.	"Sympathy"	Ceberano and John Vettese	3:51
9.	"Helen"	Ceberano and Goldenberg	4:15
10.	"Shy Baby"	Ceberano and Knight	4:26
11.	"Courage"	Ceberano and Goldenberg	3:59
12.	"Vision"	Ceberano and Goldenberg	4:55

== Credits ==
- Peter Bernstein – string arrangement (track 3)
- Suzy Katayama – string arrangement
- Kevin McCormick – bass (tracks 2, 5–8 and 12)
- Daniel Smith – cello (tracks 4, 8 and 10)
- Rudolph Stein – cello (tracks 8 and 10)
- Mauricio Lewak – drums (tracks 2, 3, 5–8 and 12)
- Mark Goldenberg – arrangement, guitar, keyboards, production, programming, recording, steel guitar (track 11)
- Roger Moutenot – mixing
- David Nottingham – mixing assistance
- Bob Salcedo – string recording
- Eve Sprecher – violin (tracks 8 and 10)
- Daniel Knight - Keyboards
- Robin Lorentz – violin (tracks 8 and 10)

== Charts ==
Chart (1998)	Peak position
Australian Albums (ARIA)	10

== Certification ==
Region	Certification	Certified units/sales
Australia (ARIA)	Gold	35,000^{^}
^{^} Shipments figures based on certification alone.
