= So Much Beauty =

Studio album by Kate Ceberano
- Released: 26 April 2008
- Recorded: 2007–2008, Sound Management Studios
- Genre: Pop, soul, jazz
- Length: 50:05
- Label: Universal Music Australia
- Producer: Steve Scanlon, Ben Balfour

Kate Ceberano chronology
Nine Lime Avenue (2007)	So Much Beauty (2008)	Bittersweet (2009)

Singles from So Much Beauty
- 1. "She Will Be Loved" Released: 26 April 2008

So Much Beauty is a studio album by Australian recording artist Kate Ceberano. It was released on 26 April 2008.

Excluding the three new tracks, "So Much Beauty", "Stars and Satellites" and "Never Say Never", the remaining 9 songs are cover versions. Ceberano co-wrote all three originals; she co-wrote "Never Say Never" with Eddie Chacon of Charles & Eddie.

Ceberano recorded it in co-producer's Steve Scanlon's lounge room, with the aim of "keeping both herself and her band relaxed".

== Track listing ==
#	Title	Original performer	Writer	Duration
1	"Suddenly I See"	KT Tunstall	Tunstall	3:54
2	"Live to Tell"	Madonna	Madonna, Patrick Leonard	4:51
3	"She Will Be Loved"	Maroon 5	Adam Levine, James Valentine, Jesse Carmichael, Mickey Madden, Ryan Dusick	4:04
4	"Avalon"	Roxy Music	Bryan Ferry	4:30
5	"So Much Beauty"	Kate Ceberano	Kate Ceberano, Dallas Cosmas	3:05
6	"I'll Stand by You"	The Pretenders	Chrissie Hynde, Billy Steinberg, Tom Kelly	4:34
7	"Chasing Cars"	Snow Patrol	Gary Lightbody, Jonathon Quinn, Nathan Connolly, Paul Wilson, Tom Simpson	3:54
8	"Stars and Satellites"	Kate Ceberano	Ceberano, Paul Gray	4:13
9	"Play Me"	Neil Diamond	Diamond	3:35
10	"Never Say Never"	Kate Ceberano	Eddie Chacon	3:38
11	"Babylon"	David Gray	Gray	4:41
12	"Bridge over Troubled Water"	Simon & Garfunkel	Simon	4:05

== Charts ==
Chart (2008)	Peak position
Australian Albums (ARIA)	9
