= 19 Days in New York =

Studio album by Kate Ceberano
- Released: 20 September 2004
- Recorded: 2004, New York City
- Genres: Rock; pop
- Labels: ABC; UMA
- Producers: Billy Davis; Leonard Caston

Kate Ceberano chronology
The Girl Can Help It (2003)	19 Days in New York (2004)	The Definitive Collection (2004)

Singles from 19 Days in New York
- 1. "Higher and Higher" Released: 2004 (promo); 2. "At Last" Released: 2004 (promo)

19 Days in New York is a studio album by Australian singer Kate Ceberano. It was released in September 2004 and consisted entirely of cover versions of previously released material.

== Background ==
On 6 January 2004, Ceberano gave birth to her first child, a daughter named "Gypsy" before travelling to New York City to record 19 Days in New York. She says; "New York is a strong part of my musical dreaming. When I was a kid I always had ambitions to go to New York to either live, play music and be part of the musical scene. If I have lived in a past life, I am sure I would have lived there because I have such a fondness for the atmosphere. I love the fact they celebrate their artists, they embrace eccentricities, they have more patience and tolerance for not so ordinary artists. It made me feel completely relaxed and in my element."

== Singles ==
Although no official singles were released from the album, promotional videos for "Higher and Higher" and "At Last" were released late in 2004.

== Track listing ==
No.	Title	Writer(s)	Length
1.	"Since I Fell for You"	Buddy Johnson	3:36
2.	"At Last"	Mack Gordon & Harry Warren	2:31
3.	"Seven Day Fool"	Berry Gordy, Sonny Woods, Tyran Carlo	5:14
4.	"Higher and Higher"	Carl Smith, Gary Jackson & Raynard Miner	5:38
5.	"Will You Still Love Me Tomorrow"	Gerry Goffin & Carole King	5:41
6.	"Wanted: Lover, No Experience Necessary"	Leonard Caston & Lloyd Webber	3:53
7.	"A Natural Woman"	Gerry Goffin, Carole King & Jerry Wexler	4:48
8.	"Fever"	Eddie Cooley & John Davenport	4:03
9.	"I Had a Talk with My Man"	Leonard Caston & Roquel Davis	4:25
10.	"Let It Be Me"	Gilbert Bécaud & Manny Curtis	3:29

== Credits ==
- Acoustic Bass: Wilbur Bascomb
- Arranged By: George Bergold (tracks: 2, 7, 8) & Leonard Caston (tracks: 1, 3 to 6, 9, 10)
- Backing Vocals: La Tanya Hall, Leonard Caston, Nicki Richards
- Bass: Jonathan Sanborn, Victor Flowers
- Drums: Buddy Williams, Reggie Flowers
- Engineer: George Karras
- Executive-Producer: Pierre Baroni, Ralph Carr
- Guitar: Gerald Flowers, Lou Volpe
- Mastered By: David Briggs, Steve Scanlon
- Mixed By: Steve Scanlon
- Piano: Eric Reed, George Pearson
- Producer: Billy Davis, Leonard Caston
- Exclusively licensed to Australian Broadcasting Corporation. Marketed in Australasia by Universal Music under exclusive licence.

== Charts ==
=== Weekly charts ===
Chart (2004)	Peak position
ARIA Albums Chart	52
ARIA Jazz Albums Chart	3

=== Year-end charts ===
Chart (2004)	Position
ARIA Jazz Albums Chart	12
