= Nine Lime Avenue =

Studio album by Kate Ceberano
- Released: 21 April 2007
- Genre: Pop, soul, jazz, Funk, Adult contemporary
- Length: Universal Music Australia
- Producer: Richard Pleasance

Kate Ceberano chronology
Kate Ceberano Live with the WASO (2006)	Nine Lime Avenue (2007)	So Much Beauty (2008)

Singles from Nine Lime Avenue
- 1. "Go Your Own Way" Released: 5 May 2007

Nine Lime Avenue is a studio album by Australian recording artist, Kate Ceberano. The album consists entirely of cover versions. The album was released in April 2007 and peaked at number 4 on the ARIA Charts.

== Background ==
Commencing in February 2007, Ceberano competed in series 6 of Dancing with the Stars Australia, (which Ceberano would go on to win). The album was recorded whilst she was competing in this series, in just three weeks.

The record is a homage to her favourite songs of the 80's. Every song has been reinvented to mould the Kate Ceberano style. Ceberano said of the album, "I grew up on Lime Avenue and spent all my teenage years through the 80's listening to different music and firing up my lust for a career in music. I'm so nostalgic about that period of my life and in many ways wished we still had that house… this album I guess is a collection of different songs connected to different memories from that time"

== Track listing ==
#	Title	Original performer	Duration
1	"Heroes"	David Bowie	4:31
2	"Raspberry Beret"	Prince & The Revolution	4:35
3	"Do You Really Want To Hurt Me"	Culture Club	4:45
4	"Love My Way"	The Psychedelic Furs	4:30
5	"The First Time Ever I Saw Your Face"	Peggy Seeger	4:17
6	"Throw Your Arms"	Hunters & Collectors	3:34
7	"Brass In Pocket"	The Pretenders	3:15
8	"If You Leave Me"	Mental As Anything	3:59
9	"Roxanne"	The Police	2:33
10	"Go Your Own Way"	Fleetwood Mac	3:38
11	"It Must Be Love"	Labi Siffre	4:41

== Charts ==
=== Weekly chart ===
The album was a commercial success. After debuting at #14, it later peaked at #4 on 20 May 2007.

Chart (2007)	Peak position
Australian Albums (ARIA)	4

=== End of year charts ===
Chart (2007)	Position
Australian Albums (ARIA)	66

== Certification ==
Region	Certification	Certified units/sales
Australia (ARIA)	Platinum	70,000^{^}
^{^} Shipments figures based on certification alone.

== Personnel ==
Credits: Arranged By – Kate Ceberano, Philip Ceberano, Richard Pleasance, Sam Keevers, Steve Hadley, Thom Mann
Backing Vocals – Philip Ceberano, Richard Pleasance, Steve Hadley, Thom Mann (tracks: 1, 10)
Bass – Richard Pleasance (tracks: 4), Steve Hadley (tracks: 1 to 3, 5 to 11)
Guitar – Philip Ceberano (tracks: 1 to 3, 5 to 11), Richard Pleasance
Keyboards – Richard Pleasance (tracks: 4), Sam Keevers (tracks: 1 to 3, 5 to 11)
Mandolin – Richard Pleasance
Mastered By, Mixed By – Steve Scanlon
Percussion – Javier Fredes (tracks: 8)
Piano – Sam Keevers
Producer – Richard Pleasance
Recorded By – Richard Pleasance
Violin – Nigel MacLean (tracks: 4)

== Tour ==
Following the success of the album, Ceberano announced a national tour. Ceberano performed 'Brass In Pocket', 'Raspberry Beret' and 'Roxanne' as well as her greatest hits, 'Bedroom Eyes', 'Brave' and 'Pash' and her Jesus Christ Superstar spotlight song 'I Don't Know How To Love Him'.

Nine Lime Avenue Tour Dates

Date	Location	Venue
14 September 2007	Sydney	The Star Theatre
21 September 2007	Brisbane	QPAC Concert Hall
22 September 2007	Newcastle	Newcastle Civic Theature
25 September 2007	Wollongong	Regent Theatre
26 September 2007	Geelong	Coast Hall
27 September 2007	Melbourne	Hammer Hall
28 September 2007	Hobart	Wrest Point Casino
1 October 2007	Adelaide	Festival Hall
