= You've Always Got the Blues =

Soundtrack album by Kate Ceberano and Wendy Matthews
- Released: 17 June 1988
- Genre: Pop, folk, world, country
- Label: ABC Records
- Producer: Martin Armiger

Kate Ceberano chronology
Kate Ceberano and her Septet (1987)	You've Always Got the Blues (1988)	Brave (1989)

Wendy Matthews chronology
You've Always Got the Blues (1998)	Émigré (1990)

Singles from You've Always Got the Blues
- 1. "You've Always Got the Blues" Released: April 1988; 2. "Guilty (Through Neglect)" Released: August 1988

You've Always Got the Blues is a 1988 album by Kate Ceberano and Wendy Matthews recorded as the soundtrack for the ABC TV series Stringer. The album, put together by Martin Armiger, is primarily composed of duets performed by Ceberano and Matthews but also features vocals by Joy Smithers and Armiger. According to Ceberano's 2014 autobiography, she and Matthews recorded the album in 48 hours.

The album received two ARIA Awards in 1989, for Best Female Artist (Kate Ceberano) and Best Original Soundtrack/Cast/Show Recording. It was also nominated for Best Female Artist (Wendy Matthews), Best Jazz Album and Best Adult Contemporary Album.

== Track listing ==
You've Always Got The Blues
No.	Title	Writer(s)	Performer	Length
1.	"You've Always Got The Blues"	Mickey Newberry	Kate Ceberano, Wendy Matthews	4:20
2.	"Guilty (Through Neglect)"	DD Smash, Dave Dobbyn	Kate Ceberano, Wendy Matthews	4:18
3.	"Back From the Dead"	Martin Armiger	Kate Ceberano, Wendy Matthews	3:53
4.	"The Danger Zone"	Curtis Mayfield	Kate Ceberano, Wendy Matthews	2:18
5.	"Stringer"	Martin Armiger	Kate Ceberano, Wendy Matthews	2:54
6.	"Sing to Me"	Don Walker	Kate Ceberano	3:33
7.	"The Girl in the Picture"	Don Walker, Steve Prestwich	Kate Ceberano, Wendy Matthews	3:48
8.	"3 = 2 + 1 (Shame)"	Martin Armiger	Kate Ceberano, Wendy Matthews	2:50
9.	"Cry Me a River"	Arthur Hamilton	Kate Ceberano, Wendy Matthews	2:47
10.	"Don't You Take It Too Bad"	Townes Van Zandt	Wendy Matthews, Martin Armiger	4:03
11.	"Young Love"	Joy Smithers, Martin Armiger, Rob Grosser	Joy Smithers	3:45
12.	"The Way You Look Tonight"	Dorothy Fields, Jerome Kern	Wendy Matthews, Kate Ceberano	2:26

== Charts ==
The album debuted and peaked at number No. 7 on 26 June 1988 on the ARIA Albums Chart and was certified platinum in Australia.

=== Weekly charts ===
Chart (1988)	Peak position
Australian Albums (ARIA)	7

=== Year-end charts ===
Chart (1988)	Position
Australian Albums (ARIA)	35

== Certification ==
Region	Certification	Certified units/sales
Australia (ARIA)	Platinum	70,000^{^}
^{^} Shipments figures based on certification alone.

== Personnel ==
=== Musicians ===
- Tony Buchanan – alto saxophone, baritone saxophone
- Graham Jesse – horns
- Kate Ceberano – vocals
- Wendy Matthews – vocals
- Joy Smithers – vocals ("Young Love")
- Joe Creighton – bass
- Ricky Fataar – drums
- Ken Francis – guitar ("The Girl in the Picture", "Young Love")
- Rex Goh – guitar
- Martin Armiger – keyboards, vocals ("Don't You Take It Too Bad")
- Andrew Thomas Wilson – hammond organ ("Guilty (Through Neglect)", "Stringer")
- Kenny Kitchings – pedal steel guitar
- Max Lambert – piano
- Col Loughnan – tenor saxophone
- Paul Panici – trumpet, flugelhorn

=== Production ===
- Producer – Martin Armiger
- Recording, Mixing – Mike Stavrou
- Mastering – Don Bartley
