= The Girl Can Help It =

Studio album by Kate Ceberano
- Released: September 2003
- Length: 46:27
- Label: Ceberano (licensed to ABC Music)
- Producers: Kate Ceberano, Richard Pleasance, Mark Goldenberg, Pam Reswick, Steve Scanlon and John Ryan

Kate Ceberano chronology
True Romantic (1999)	The Girl Can Help It (2003)	19 Days in New York (2004)

Singles from The Girl Can Help It
- 1. "Yes" Released: August 2003

The Girl Can Help It is a studio album by Australian singer Kate Ceberano. The album was dedicated to L. Ron Hubbard, the author and founder of the Church of Scientology. Released September 2003, the album peaked at number 115 on the ARIA charts.

== Background ==
Following the release of her 1999 best of album True Romantic, Ceberano has moved to the United States. In 2002, she discovered she was pregnant with her first child and wanted to move back to Melbourne. In her 2014 autobiography, Ceberano says she started recording the album in May 2003 and was eager to finish the album and tour before the baby was due in December.

Ceberano launched the album with a series of live shows, where she sang and played the piano live for the first time.

== Track listing ==
No.	Title	Writer(s)	Length
1.	"Beautiful Life"	Kate Ceberano	3:50
2.	"Sunburn"	Ceberano	4:09
3.	"Yes"	Ceberano	3:45
4.	"Pilot"	Ceberano, Michael Duff	3:41
5.	"I Hope I Never"	Tim Finn	5:11
6.	"A Good Thing"	Ceberano, Pam Reswick	3:38
7.	"Bring It On"	Ceberano, Vivian Campbell	3:30
8.	"Let Me In"	Ceberano, Phillip Ceberano	4:15
9.	"3 Small Words"	Ceberano, Duff	3:38
10.	"Let's All Get Together"	Don Walker	3:03
11.	"Cherry Blossom Lipstick"	Ceberano, Mark Goldenberg	5:17
Total length:			46:27

- Enhanced CD includes "Yes" music video directed and produced by Lee Rogers.

== Charts ==
Chart (2003)	Peak position
Australian Albums (ARIA)	115
