= Brave (Kate Ceberano album) =

Studio album by Kate Ceberano
- Released: 4 August 1989
- Genre: Pop
- Length: 41:07
- Labels: Regular, Festival

Kate Ceberano chronology
| You've Always Got the Blues (1988) | Brave (1989) | Like Now (1990) |

Singles from Brave
- 1. "Bedroom Eyes" Released: 17 April 1989; 2. "Love Dimension" Released: July 1989; 3. "Young Boys Are My Weakness"/"Brave" Released: October 1989; 4. "That's What I Call Love" Released: 18 February 1990

Brave is the debut solo studio album by Australian singer-songwriter Kate Ceberano, after her previous collaborative album with Wendy Matthews. It was her first solo foray into pop after two previously more adult-oriented albums. The album was released in August 1989 by Regular Records. ARIA has certified the album for triple platinum sales in Australia.

== Album history ==
A mix of contemporary pop and dance tracks and soul covers, Brave became a major success on the Australian albums chart, firmly establishing Ceberano as one of Australia's premier artists, and would become the most commercially successful album of her solo career.

Brave was nominated for the ARIA Award for Best Australian Album - making Ceberano the first female solo artist to be nominated for this award. Brave also established Ceberano's role as a chameleon of sorts, following on from successful jazz and adult-oriented releases, Brave also seemed to, in part, pay homage to her dance roots as a vocalist in Australian band I'm Talking.

Two tracks, "Young Boys Are My Weakness" and "Obsession", were recorded with Phil Harding and Ian Curnow at PWL Studios, with Harding recalling, "for us to work with such a great singer was an unusual treat."

The album spawned a succession of four top 40 singles; "Bedroom Eyes", "Love Dimension", "Brave"/"Young Boys Are My Weakness" and "That's What I Call Love", all of which achieved strong rotation on Australian radio and helped propel the album to triple platinum status.

Brave went on to become the fifth highest selling album of 1989 by a local artist on the ARIA Albums Chart, and the 20th highest selling album of 1989 in Australia.. It reached a peak of number 2 on the Australian albums chart.

== Critical reception ==
Reviewed at the time of release, Juke said, "The music is straight down the white line of the road, with Ceberano's voice - as pure and pitch-correct as ever - holding a straighter course than on her jazz-tinged live set. Even though she says this is a pop album, her love of jazz can't help shining through."

== Track listing ==
Side one

1. "Since You've Been Gone"
2. "Love Dimension"
3. "Quasimodo's Dream"
4. "Young Boys Are My Weakness"
5. "Brave"

Side two

6. "Bedroom Eyes"
7. "That's What I Call Love"
8. "Higher Ground"
9. "Obsession"
10. "Changing with the Years"

== Charts ==
The album debuted and peaked at number 2 in September 1989.

=== Weekly chart ===
| Chart (1989/90) | Peak position |
|---|---|
| Australian Albums (ARIA) | 2 |

=== Year-end chart ===
| Chart (1989) | Position |
|---|---|
| Australian Albums (ARIA) | 20 |
| Chart (1990) | Position |
| Australian Albums (ARIA) | 74 |

== Certification ==
| Region | Certification | Certified units/sales |
|---|---|---|
| Australia (ARIA) | 3× Platinum | 210,000^{^} |
^{^} Shipments figures based on certification alone.
