= Pash (song) =

1997 single by Kate Ceberano

Single by Kate Ceberano

from the album Pash
- Released: 1997
- Studio: Shabby Road (Valley Village, California)
- Genre: Pop
- Length: 3:36
- Label: Mushroom
- Songwriters: Kate Ceberano; Mark Goldenberg
- Producer: Mark Goldenberg

Kate Ceberano singles chronology
"Blue Box" (1996)	"Pash" (1997)	"Love Is Alive" (1998)

"Pash" is a pop song by Australian singer Kate Ceberano. It was released in 1997 as the first single from her sixth studio album of the same name. The track was co-written by Ceberano with the album's producer, Mark Goldenberg. In March 1998, it peaked at number 10 on the Australian ARIA Singles Chart and was certified gold by the Australian Recording Industry Association (ARIA) for shipment of 35,000 copies. In New Zealand, it reached the top 40. At the ARIA Music Awards of 1998, Ceberano was nominated for Best Female Artist for "Pash". AllMusic's Jonathan Lewis reviewed the album and observed, "The '60s-influenced pop of the title track became her biggest hit since 'Bedroom Eyes'."

== Background ==
Australian singer Kate Ceberano had started her solo career in 1987 after providing lead vocals for funk-pop, rock group I'm Talking (1983–1987). Ten years later she prepared material for her sixth studio album, Pash, which appeared in May 1998. It was produced by Mark Goldenberg for Mushroom Records and provided the title track as its lead single, which was issued in November 1997.

"Pash" was co-written by Ceberano and Goldenberg and peaked at number 10 on the Australian ARIA Singles Chart. It spent twenty-one weeks on the Australian Singles Chart top 50 and was certified gold by the ARIA in March 1998 for shipment of 35,000 copies. On the New Zealand Singles Chart, it reached number 36.

In October 1998, "Pash" earned Ceberano her ninth nomination for an ARIA Award for Best Female Artist but she lost to Natalie Imbruglia. AllMusic's Jonathan Lewis observed, "The '60s-influenced pop of the title track became her biggest hit since 'Bedroom Eyes'."

== Track listing ==
Australian maxi-CD single

1. "Pash" (radio edit) (Kate Ceberano, Mark Goldenberg)
2. "Helen" (Ceberano, Goldenberg)
3. "Pash" (karaoke kiss-along) (Ceberano, Goldenberg)

== Charts ==
=== Weekly charts ===
Chart (1997–1998)	Peak position
Australia (ARIA)	10
New Zealand (Recorded Music NZ)	36

=== Year-end charts ===
Chart (1998)	Position
Australia (ARIA)	61

== Certifications ==
Region	Certification	Certified units/sales
Australia (ARIA)	Gold	35,000^{^}
^{^} Shipments figures based on certification alone.

== Cover versions ==
- In 2015, Dorsal Fins covered the song for Triple J Like a Version - Volume 11.
