= Bedroom Eyes (song) =

1989 single by Kate Ceberano

Single by Kate Ceberano

from the album Brave
- B-side: "Kate's Blues"
- Released: 17 April 1989
- Studio: Rak (London, England)
- Length: 3:55
- Label: Regular, Festival
- Songwriters: Raymond Jones, Sam McKinney
- Producers: Nick Launay, Raymond Jones

Kate Ceberano singles chronology
"Guilty (Through Neglect)" (1988)	"Bedroom Eyes" (1989)	"Love Dimension" (1989)

"Bedroom Eyes" is a song by Australian singer Kate Ceberano. It was released as the first single from her debut solo album, Brave, in April 1989 through Regular and Festival Records. "Bedroom Eyes" spent six weeks at No. 2 on the Australian ARIA Singles Chart and became the seventh-highest-selling single in Australia as well as the highest-selling single by an Australian artist in 1989.

== Track listings ==
Australian and New Zealand 7-inch single

No.	Title	Writer(s)	Length
1.	"Bedroom Eyes" (Produced by Nick Launay and Raymond Jones)	Raymond Jones, Sam McKinney	3:55
2.	"Kate's Blues" (Produced by Kate Ceberano and her Sextet)	Jex Saarelaht, Kate Ceberano, Russell Smith	3:36

Australian 12-inch single

No.	Title	Writer(s)	Length
1.	"Bedroom Eyes" (extended remix)	R. Jones, S. McKinney
2.	"Bedroom Eyes"	R. Jones, S. McKinney
3.	"Kate's Blues"	J. Saarelaht, K. Ceberano, R. Smith

== Charts ==
=== Weekly charts ===
Chart (1989)	Peak position
Australia (ARIA)	2
New Zealand (Recorded Music NZ)	38

=== Year-end charts ===
Chart (1989)	Position
Australia (ARIA)	7

== Certifications ==
Region	Certification	Certified units/sales
Australia (ARIA)	Platinum	70,000^{^}
^{^} Shipments figures based on certification alone.

== Release history ==
Region	Date	Format(s)	Label(s)	Ref.
Australia	17 April 1989	7-inch vinyl; 12-inch vinyl; cassette	Regular; Festival	
United Kingdom	25 September 1989	7-inch vinyl; 12-inch vinyl	London	
