= Kate Ceberano =

Australian singer

Kate Ceberano AM
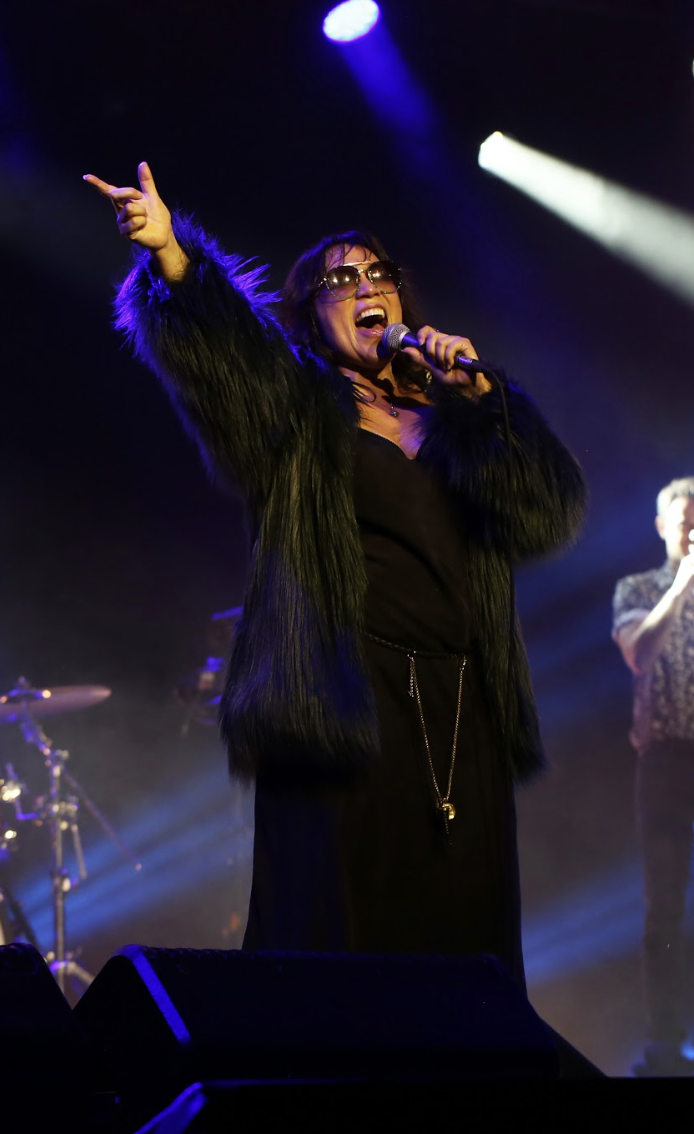
- Ceberano at Bluesfest 2022

Background information
- Born: Catherine Yvette Ceberano; 17 November 1966 (age 60); Melbourne, Victoria, Australia
- Genres: Pop, rock, soul, jazz
- Occupations: Singer; songwriter; pianist; actress; musical theatre performer; TV personality
- Years active: 1983–present
- Labels: Sony, ABC
- Website: kateceberano.com

Catherine Yvette Ceberano (/səˈbrɑːnoʊ/ or /sɛbəˈrɑːnoʊ/, born 17 November 1966) is an Australian singer and actress. She performs in the rock, soul, jazz, and pop genres, as well as in film and musicals such as Jesus Christ Superstar. Her single "Bedroom Eyes" received a platinum sales certification in 1989. Ceberano was the artistic director of the Adelaide Cabaret Festival in 2012, 2013, and 2014. A Member of the Order of Australia, she has also won many awards, including AIR Awards, Mo Awards, and ARIA Awards. At the 2026 ARIA Music Awards, she was inducted in the ARIA Hall of Fame.

== Early life and education ==
Catherine Yvette Ceberano was born in Melbourne, Australia, to an American father of Filipino descent and an Australian mother. Her father is karate master Tino Ceberano, from Hawaii. Her maternal forebears were some of the earliest settlers and government officials in South Australia, Victoria and Tasmania.

== Career ==
=== Music ===
==== 1980s: I'm Talking, You've Always Got the Blues and Brave ====
Ceberano first came to prominence as lead singer for I'm Talking in 1984 with her first top 10 single "Trust Me". I'm Talking are acknowledged as the band "who pioneered New York-style art pop in Australia during the Jurassic Period of Pub Rock". The group was managed by Ken West, now known for being a co-founder of the Big Day Out events. The group's debut album, Bear Witness, included three top ten singles, two top twenty singles and achieved a platinum sales certification. Ceberano won the Most Popular Female Performer award at the 1986 Countdown Awards.

After the debut album, the group broke up and Ceberano went solo. It was then, in the late 1980s, that she earned a reputation for her soul, jazz and pop repertoire. Radio stations labelled her as having "one of the greatest voices our music industry has ever produced". Ceberano's first solo album was the live recording Kate Ceberano and her Septet, released in March 1987. In September 1987, Ceberano represented Australia at the 1987 ABU Popular Song Contest with the song "Time Can't Keep Us Apart", written by Allan Zavod, winning the contest.

In 1988, she collaborated with Wendy Matthews on the album You've Always Got the Blues, which was the soundtrack to the ABC Television show Stringer. The album peaked at No. 7 on the ARIA charts and earned her a nomination for the ARIA Award for Best Female Artist in 1988.

In 1989, Ceberano released her album Brave, which sold triple platinum. The album was the 20th highest-selling album in Australia in 1989 and spawned four singles, including "Bedroom Eyes", which became the fifth highest-selling single in Australia in 1989 and the highest-selling single by an Australian artist that year. Two tracks, "Young Boys Are My Weakness" and "Obsession", were recorded with Phil Harding and Ian Curnow at PWL Studios, with Harding recalling, "for us to work with such a great singer was an unusual treat."

At the 1989 ARIA awards, she won the ARIA Award for Best Female Artist and ARIA Award for Highest Selling Single for "Bedroom Eyes".

==== 1990s: Think About It!, Jesus Christ Superstar, Blue Box, Pash and True Romantic ====
In 1990, Ceberano contributed "Nature Boy" to The Crossing soundtrack. At the end of 1990, she received three Mo Awards for Jazz Performer, Female Rock Performer and Contemporary Concert Performer of the Year.

In 1991, Ceberano released Think About It! in 1991. In 1992, she joined the cast of the Australian national tour of Jesus Christ Superstar, taking the role of Mary Magdalene. The album was the highest-selling album in Australia in 1992, certified four times platinum. Three singles were released from the album, including "Everything's Alright" (with John Farnham and Jon Stevens), which peaked at No. 6 on the ARIA charts. Ceberano won a Logie Award for Most Popular Music Video in 1993 for "Everything's Alright". "I Don't Know How To Love Him" was the second single and won Ceberano another nomination for Best Female Artist in 1993. Ceberano followed this success with a late-night cabaret show on ABC-TV called Kate Ceberano and Friends (1993–1994). The album from the program was certified gold and peaked at No. 19 in 1994.

Ceberano travelled to New York and recorded a number of songs which were to appear of an album with the working title of Globe. The album was scrapped by label Elektra Records. However, a number of recordings from this session appears on her 1996 album Blue Box which also went gold. She was nominated for another Best Female Artist at the ARIA Music Awards of 1995. In 1997 she co-wrote and released "Pash", a pop song which went platinum. The album Pash went to No. 5 on the ARIA charts, was certified gold and the first album to bear Ceberano's songwriting credit on every track.

In 1999, Ceberano released her first greatest hits collection, True Romantic: The Best of Kate Ceberano. The album included 16 hits from her career to date, along with two new singles, "I Won't Let You Down" and "True Romantic". The album peaking in at No. 9 on the ARIA Album Charts and was certified double platinum. Ceberano was part of two major Australian tours that year – the John Farnham I Can't Believe He's 50 tour and her own greatest hits Australian tour (supported by Vika & Linda and Vanessa Amorosi).

==== 2000s: The Girl Can Help It, Nine Lime Avenue, So Much Beauty & Merry Christmas ====
In the early 2000s, Ceberano relocating to Los Angeles and signed with Chicago Kid Records, which released her single "Yes" in 2002. As Ceberano wrote in her autobiography, she wrote an album titled The Girl Who Ruled The World, which was ultimately declined by her Australian record company. Returning to Australia, Ceberano signed with an Australian manager and released her 2003 studio album The Girl Can Help It, which peaked at number 115 on the ARIA charts.

In 2007, Ceberano saluted the 1980s with her cover album Nine Lime Avenue, which was recorded in three weeks while she was on television show Dancing with the Stars. The album was a commercial success, peaking at No. 4 and gave Ceberano her first top 5 album since 1989's "Brave". Ceberano toured in late 2007 before recording another cover album, released in 2008, titled So Much Beauty, which peaked at No. 9 in Australia.

Ceberano released three albums in 2009: the first is a collaborative jazz album that was recorded with Mark Isham, titled Bittersweet, which earned Ceberano a nomination at the 2009 ARIA awards; the second, an indie album with Dallas Cosmas, titled Dallas et Kate; and in November, Ceberano released her first Christmas album, simply titled Merry Christmas, which was certified gold.

==== 2010s: Kensal Road, Anthology and Tryst ====
In 2010, Ceberano was crowned Queen of Moomba, while Molly Meldrum was crowned King.

Ceberano launched a studio album in August 2013, recorded in London and titled Kensal Road, it was her first album of new material in ten years. The album was preceded by the single release "Magnet" and Ceberano toured nationally in October 2013.

On 6 May 2016, her 3-disc Anthology album was released. On 15 April 2018, Ceberano performed at the 2018 Commonwealth Games closing ceremony.

On 17 October 2018, Ceberano confirmed that she will reunite with I'm Talking, who will return to the stage in 2019 for to support Bryan Ferry's Australian tour. "I never, ever thought I'm Talking would reform and I'm a very optimistic person. The band split due to external pressures. So this reunion feels really good. Everything's amicable, we're all getting along. You learn a lot in hindsight. After 30 plus years things take on a treasured hue. You're not tired of the songs. They actually sound awesome. We are a time capsule."

In 2019, Ceberano released Tryst with Paul Grabowsky. The album won the ARIA Award for Best Jazz Album at the ARIA Music Awards of 2019.

==== 2020s: Sweet Inspiration, My Life Is a Symphony and Australian Made Live ====
In February 2021, Ceberano released Sweet Inspiration, her 17th studio and 28th career album. It includes ten cover versions and two original tracks.

In May 2023, Ceberano released My Life Is a Symphony with Melbourne Symphony Orchestra.

Throughout 2025, Ceberano toured the Australian Made Live, which was extended into 2026. The live album Australian Made Live was released in August 2025.

As of June 2026, she is one of only four Australian artists alongside AC/DC, Midnight Oil, and Kylie Minogue to achieve Top 10 albums across five consecutive decades.

=== Film and television ===
Ceberano made her acting debut in a feature film, playing Jenna in Dust Off the Wings, directed by her husband, Lee Rogers.

In 1993, Ceberano hosted her own late-night cabaret-style show on ABC TV called Kate Ceberano And Friends.

In 1999, Ceberano starred in the film Molokai: The Story of Father Damien, which was directed by Paul Cox.

In 2005, Ceberano was a judge in the inaugural season of X Factor Australia, along with Mark Holden and John Reid, then Natalie Imbruglia became her replacement, before joining Dancing with the Stars in 2007, of which she was crowned champion. Late that year, Ceberano participated in series 2 of It Takes Two, where she mentored Australian swimmer Daniel Kowalski. She returned in 2008 for series 3 and mentored Australian Football League (AFL) player Russell Robertson, who would go on to be runner-up.

In January 2008, Ceberano's family tree and career was documented in SBS's Who Do You Think You Are? (series 1/ episode 2).

From January 2011, Ceberano was a presenter on the Nine Network's Getaway television series, as well as a relief host for Kerri-Anne Kennerley's morning program also on the Nine Network. In November 2011, Ceberano was announced as the host of the Nine Network's television series Excess Baggage.

In late 2019, she was eliminated seventh from The Masked Singer and revealed to be the 'Lion'.

== Other activities ==
As the Berlei Curves ambassador, Ceberano launched the debut Berlei Curves Spring Summer 2010 collection and remained in this role in September 2012.

Ceberano was appointed the Victorian Ambassador for the National Breast Cancer Foundation. As the Victorian Ambassador, she helps to raise funds and awareness about breast cancer. Ceberano explained: "I like to be as involved as I possibly can in causes I feel strongly about. Yes, I am a musician, but if I can do more to help others then I will."

From August to October 2012, she played the part of Bloody Mary in the Bartlett Sher directed revival of the musical South Pacific throughout the Australian east coast. The show included Teddy Tahu Rhodes, Lisa McCune, and Eddie Perfect.

Her memoir, I'm Talking: My Life, My Words, My Music, was published by Hachette Australia in 2014. She co-wrote the book with Tom Gilling.

On 3 October 2015, she sang the Australian national anthem before AFL Grand Final at the MCG in Melbourne, Australia.

== Personal life ==
In February 1996, Ceberano married Lee Rogers after an almost four-year engagement. They married at Mietta O'Donnell's Queenscliff Hotel on Port Phillip Bay. In 2004, she gave birth to their daughter.

Portraits of Ceberano have twice won the Archibald Packing Room Prize: Peter Robertson's in 1994 and Kathrin Longhurst's in 2021. Christine O'Hagan's portrait of her was also an Archibald finalist in 2010.

Ceberano is a Scientologist.

== Discography ==
- You've Always Got the Blues (with Wendy Matthews, 1988)
- Brave (1989)
- Like Now (as Kate Ceberano & Her Sextet, 1990)
- Think About It! (1991)
- Blue Box (1996)
- Pash (1998)
- True Romantic (1999)
- The Girl Can Help It (2003)
- 19 Days in New York (2004)
- Nine Lime Avenue (2007)
- So Much Beauty (2008)
- Bittersweet (with Mark Isham, 2009)
- Dallas et Kate (with Dallas Cosmos, 2009)
- Merry Christmas (2009)
- Kensal Road (2013)
- Lullaby (with Nigel MacLean, 2015)
- Anthology (2016)
- Tryst (with Paul Grabowsky, 2019)
- The Dangerous Age (with Steve Kilbey and Sean Sennett, 2020)
- Sweet Inspiration (2021)
- My Life Is a Symphony (with Melbourne Symphony Orchestra, 2023)

== Awards and nominations ==
=== AIR Awards ===
The Australian Independent Record Awards (commonly known informally as AIR Awards) is an annual awards night to recognise, promote and celebrate the success of Australia's Independent Music sector.

Year	Nominee / work	Award	Result	Ref.
2020	Tryst	Best Independent Jazz Album or EP	Won	
2024	My Life Is a Symphony	Best Independent Pop Album or EP	Nominated	

=== APRA Awards ===
The APRA Awards are held in Australia and New Zealand by the Australasian Performing Right Association to recognise songwriting skills, sales and airplay performance by its members annually. Ceberano has been nominated for one award.

Year	Nominee / work	Award	Result
1999	"Love Is Alive" (Mark Goldenberg and Kate Ceberano)	Most Performed Australian Work	Nominated

=== ARIA Awards ===
The ARIA Music Awards is an annual awards ceremony that recognises excellence, innovation, and achievement across all genres of Australian music. As of 2026, Ceberano has been nominated for 22 awards, with five wins, Best Female Artist (1989 and 1990), Highest Selling Single (1990), Highest Selling Album (1993) and Best Jazz Album (2019).

At the 2026 ARIA Music Awards, Ceberano will be inducted in the ARIA Hall of Fame.

Year	Nominee / work	Award	Result
1988	—N/a	Best Female Artist	Nominated
1989	You've Always Got the Blues	Best Female Artist	Won
1989	You've Always Got the Blues	Best Adult Contemporary Album (with Wendy Matthews)	Nominated
1989	You've Always Got the Blues	Best Jazz Album (with Wendy Matthews)	Nominated
1990	"Bedroom Eyes"	Highest Selling Single	Won
1990	Brave	Album of the Year	Nominated
1990	Brave	Best Female Artist	Won
1991	Like Now	Best Female Artist	Nominated
1992	Think About It!	Best Female Artist	Nominated
1993	"I Don't Know How to Love Him"	Best Female Artist	Nominated
1993	"Everything's Alright" (with John Farnham and Jon Stevens)	Highest Selling Single	Nominated
1993	Jesus Christ Superstar (soundtrack)	Highest Selling Album	Won
1993	Jesus Christ Superstar (soundtrack)	Best Original Soundtrack / Cast / Show Recording	Nominated
1993	David Hirschfelder for Kate Ceberano – "I Don't Know How to Love Him"	Producer of the Year	Nominated
1994	Best Female Artist	"You've Got a Friend"	Nominated
1996	Best Female Artist	"Change"	Nominated
1996	Best Adult Contemporary Album	"Change"	Nominated
1998	"Pash"	Best Female Artist	Nominated
2009	Bittersweet	Best Jazz Album (with Mark Isham)	Nominated
2019	Tryst	Best Jazz Album (with Paul Grabowsky)	Won
2023	My Life Is a Symphony	Best Adult Contemporary Album	Nominated
2026	Kate Ceberano	ARIA Hall of Fame	inducted

=== Australian Songwriters Hall of Fame ===
The Australian Songwriters Hall of Fame was established in 2004 to honour the lifetime achievements of some of Australia's greatest songwriters.

Year	Nominee / work	Award	Result
2014	herself	Australian Songwriters Hall of Fame	inducted

=== Australian Women in Music Awards ===
The Australian Women in Music Awards is an annual event that celebrates outstanding women in the Australian Music Industry who have made significant and lasting contributions in their chosen field. They commenced in 2018.

Year	Nominee / work	Award	Result	Ref.
2021	Kate Ceberano	Lifetime Achievement Award	Nominated	
2023	Kate Ceberano	Lifetime Achievement Award	awarded	

=== Countdown Awards ===
Countdown was an Australian pop music TV series on national broadcaster ABC-TV from 1974 to 1987, it presented music awards from 1979 to 1987. The Countdown Music and Video Awards were succeeded by the ARIA Awards. The 1986 awards ceremony was held on 19 July 1987 at Sydney Opera House, it followed the last regular Countdown show.

Year	Nominee / work	Award	Result
1984	herself ("Trust Me" by I'm Talking)	Best Female Performance in a Video	Nominated
1986	herself	Most Popular Female Performer	Won
1986	herself ("Do You Wanna Be?" by I'm Talking)	Best Female Performance in a Video	Nominated

=== Helpmann Awards ===
The Helpmann Awards is an awards show, celebrating live entertainment and performing arts in Australia, presented by industry group Live Performance Australia since 2001. Note: 2020 and 2021 were cancelled due to the COVID-19 pandemic.

Year	Nominee / work	Award	Result	Ref.
2008	Nine Lime Avenue tour	Best Performance in an Australian Contemporary Concert	Nominated	

=== Logie Awards ===
The Logie Awards (officially the TV Week Logie Awards) is an annual gathering to celebrate Australian television, sponsored and organised by magazine TV Week, with the first ceremony in 1959, known then as the TV Week Awards, the awards are presented in 20 categories representing both public and industry voted awards.

Year	Nominee / work	Award	Result
1993	"Everything's Alright" (with John Farnham and Jon Stevens)	Most Popular Music Video	Won

=== Mo Awards ===
The Australian Entertainment Mo Awards (commonly known informally as the Mo Awards), were annual Australian entertainment industry awards. They recognise achievements in live entertainment in Australia from 1975 to 2016. Ceberano won four awards in that time.

Year	Nominee / work	Award	Result (wins only)
1989	herself	Contemporary Concert Performer of the Year	Won
1989	herself	Female Rock Performer of the Year	Won
1989	herself	Rock Performer of the Year	Won
1990	herself	Jazz Performer of the Year	Won

=== Order of Australia ===
In the 2016 Queen's Birthday Honours, Ceberano was appointed Member of the Order of Australia for significant service to the performing arts, particularly music, as a singer, songwriter and entertainer, and to charitable organisations.

=== World Music Awards ===
The World Music Awards was an international award show founded in 1989 under the patronage of Albert II, Prince of Monaco and co-founder/executive producer John Martinotti. The event was based in Monte Carlo. Awards were presented to the world's best-selling artists in a number of categories and to the best-selling artists from each major territory.

Year	Nominee / work	Award	Result	Ref.
1990	herself	Best-Selling Australian Artist	Won	

== Film and television ==
=== Films ===
- 1986 Love Della (short film), Director: Graeme Wood
- 1987 Australian Made: The Movie, Director: Richard Lowenstein
- 1989 Arguing the Toss of a Cat (telemovie), Director: Christine Sammers
- 1997 Dust Off the Wings (feature film), Director: Lee Rogers
- 1999 Molokai: The Story of Father Damien (feature film), Director: Paul Cox
- 1999 Opening theatrical sequence for Sydney's Fox Studios, Director: Baz Luhrmann

=== Television highlights ===
- The X Factor (Australia) (Channel 10, 2005)
- Dancing with the Stars (Channel 7, 2007) — winner of series 6
- It Takes Two (Channel 7, 2007–2008) — runner-up of series 3
- Who Do You Think You Are? (SBS, Series 1, Episode 2, 2008)
- Neighbours (Channel 10, 2010)
- Getaway (Channel 9, 2011)
- The Living Room (Channel 10, 17 July 2015)
- The Masked Singer Australia (Channel 10, 2019) — eliminated seventh

== See also ==
- Models
- I'm Talking

Awards and achievements
Preceded by Anthony Koutoufides & Natalie Lowe	Dancing with the Stars (Australia) winner Season 6 (Early 2007 with John Paul Collins)	Succeeded by Bridie Carter & Craig Monley
