= Little Birdy discography =

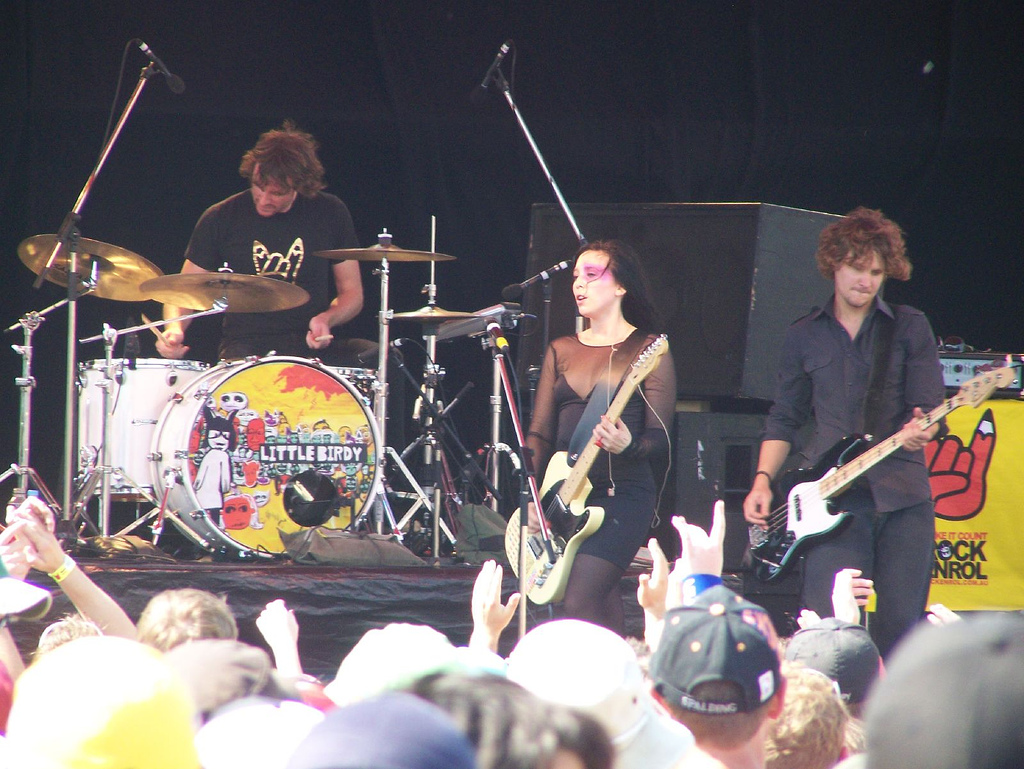
- Little Birdy at Big Day Out, Perth, 2007
- Studio albums: 3
- Extended plays: 2
- Singles: 12

The discography of Little Birdy, an Australian indie rock band, consists of three studio albums, two EPs, and twelve singles.

== Studio albums ==
Title	Details	Peak chart positions	Certifications (sales thresholds)
Title	Details	AUS	Certifications (sales thresholds)
BigBigLove	Released: 4 October 2004; Label: Eleven (ELEVENCD29); Format: CD, digital download	5	ARIA: Gold
Hollywood	Released: 13 October 2006; Label: Eleven (ELEVENCD50); Format: CD, digital download	9	ARIA: Gold
Confetti	Released: 8 May 2009; Label: Eleven (ELEVENCD86); Format: CD, digital download	6	ARIA: Gold

== EPs ==
Title	Details	Peak chart positions
Title	Details	AUS
Little Birdy	Released: 6 October 2003; Label: Eleven (ELEVENCD17); Format: CD, digital download	27
This Is a Love Song EP	Released: 1 March 2004; Label: Eleven (ELEVENCD22); Format: CD, digital download	22

== Singles ==
Year	Title	Peak chart positions		Album
Year	Title	AUS	Triple J Hottest 100	Album
2003	"Relapse"	—	16	Little Birdy
2003	"Baby Blue"	—	25	Little Birdy
2004	"Beautiful to Me"	27	8	BigBigLove
2004	"Tonight's the Night"	76	78	BigBigLove
2005	"Excited"	44	—	BigBigLove
2006	"Come On Come On"	18	11	Hollywood
2007	"Bodies"	68	—	Hollywood
2007	"After Dark"	—	—	Hollywood
2009	"Brother"	90	34	Confetti
2009	"Summarize"	54	159	Confetti
2009	"Hairdo"	—	—	Confetti
2009	"Stay Wild"	—	—	Confetti
"—" denotes a recording that did not chart or was not released in that territory.

== Collaborations ==
- "Where Did I Go Wrong?" (2009) - Rosie Catalano featuring Little Birdy
