= Triple J's Hottest 100 of 2009 =

Annual music poll presented by a national Australian radio station

2009 Triple J Hottest 100
- Album artwork for the CD compilation

Countdown details
- Date of countdown: 26 January 2010

Countdown highlights
- Winning song: Mumford & Sons "Little Lion Man"
- Most entries: Muse; Florence and the Machine (4 tracks)

Chronology
← Previous; 2009 (Of All Time)	Next → 2010

The 2009 Triple J's Hottest 100 Volume 17, was announced on January 26, 2010. It is the seventeenth countdown of the most popular songs of the year, as chosen by the listeners of Australian radio station Triple J.

Voting commenced on Boxing Day, 26 December 2009, and closed on 17 January 2010. 1.1 million votes were received, a record number.

Controversy began when it was rumoured that the winner had been unintentionally leaked by the ABC. The ABC Shop website promoted the February issue of Jmag with a description stating "Topping the 2009 countdown is Mumford & Sons' 'Little Lion Man'". Triple J neither confirmed nor denied the rumour with some even claiming it was a hoax, amounting to a clever marketing campaign. The leak led Sportingbet Australia to close all betting on the countdown. The leak proved to be accurate. For the first time, the number one song was performed live on air by the winning artist, Mumford & Sons, from Triple J studios, followed by the studio version of the song.

== Full list ==
Note: Australian artists

#	Song	Artist	Country of origin
1	Little Lion Man (Note: The number one song had the largest winning margin in Triple J Hottest 100 history.)	Mumford & Sons	United Kingdom
2	Parlez Vous Francais?	Art vs. Science	Australia
3	Chase That Feeling	Hilltop Hoods	Australia
4	Lisztomania	Phoenix	France
5	Broken Leg	Bluejuice	Australia
6	Bulletproof	La Roux	United Kingdom
7	Coin Laundry	Lisa Mitchell	Australia
8	Not Fair	Lily Allen	United Kingdom
9	Uprising	Muse	United Kingdom
10	Dog Days Are Over	Florence & the Machine	United Kingdom
11	Heads Will Roll	Yeah Yeah Yeahs	United States
12	Bonkers	Dizzee Rascal and Armand van Helden	United Kingdom/United States
13	1901	Phoenix	France
14	Sticks 'n' Stones	Jamie T	United Kingdom
15	Home	Edward Sharpe & the Magnetic Zeros	United States
16	Heavy Cross	Gossip	United States
17	Fire	Kasabian	United Kingdom
18	Shooting Stars	Bag Raiders	Australia
19	Undisclosed Desires	Muse	United Kingdom
20	Sleepyhead	Passion Pit	United States
21	Fader	The Temper Trap	Australia
22	Cousins	Vampire Weekend	United States
23	Warp 1.9	The Bloody Beetroots featuring Steve Aoki	Italy/United States
24	Carol Brown	Flight of the Conchords	New Zealand
25	Zero	Yeah Yeah Yeahs	United States
26	Help I'm Alive	Metric	Canada
27	In for the Kill	La Roux	United Kingdom
28	We Won't Run	Sarah Blasko	Australia
29	All I Want	Sarah Blasko	Australia
30	Hurt Feelings	Flight of the Conchords	New Zealand
31	The Waitress Song	Seth Sentry	Australia
32	Ramona Was a Waitress	Paul Dempsey	Australia
33	Pursuit of Happiness	Kid Cudi featuring MGMT and Ratatat	United States
34	Brother	Little Birdy	Australia
35	Resistance	Muse	United Kingdom
36	(If You're Wondering If I Want You To) I Want You To	Weezer	United States
37	Still Standing	Hilltop Hoods	Australia
38	Little Secrets	Passion Pit	United States
39	One Way Road	John Butler Trio	Australia
40	And the Boys	Angus & Julia Stone	Australia
41	Audacity of Huge	Simian Mobile Disco featuring Chris Keating	United Kingdom/United States
42	Vanilla	British India	Australia
43	Awesome	The Bloody Beetroots featuring The Cool Kids	Italy/United States
44	Rabbit Heart (Raise It Up)	Florence & the Machine	United Kingdom
45	Drumming Song	Florence & the Machine	United Kingdom
46	Blood Bank	Bon Iver	United States
47	Set Fire to the Hive	Karnivool	Australia
48	Science of Fear	The Temper Trap	Australia
49	All of the Dreamers	Powderfinger	Australia
50	Buttons (CSS Remix)	Sia	Australia/Brazil (Note: CSS is the first artist from Brazil to feature in the Hottest 100. They are also the first artist from South America to feature in the countdown.)
51	Where Did All the Love Go?	Kasabian	United Kingdom
52	Horchata	Vampire Weekend	United States
53	Animal	Miike Snow	Sweden
54	Crying Lightning	Arctic Monkeys	United Kingdom
55	No You Girls	Franz Ferdinand	United Kingdom
56	Islands	The xx	United Kingdom
57	The Good News	Philadelphia Grand Jury	Australia
58	Love Lost	The Temper Trap	Australia
59	I'm Not Alone	Calvin Harris	United Kingdom
60	22	Lily Allen	United Kingdom
61	Two Weeks	Grizzly Bear	United States
62	One More Chance	Bloc Party	United Kingdom
63	All I Know	Karnivool	Australia
64	Blood	The Middle East	Australia
65	Foreign Land	Eskimo Joe	Australia
66	Pictures	Illy	Australia
67	Cement	Washington	Australia
68	Omen	The Prodigy	United Kingdom
69	Meet Me on the Equinox	Death Cab for Cutie	United States
70	My Girls	Animal Collective	United States
71	Byrds of Prey	Bertie Blackman	Australia
72	You've Changed	Sia	Australia
73	Heartbreaker	MSTRKRFT featuring John Legend	Canada/United States
74	Friend in the Field	Art vs. Science	Australia
75	New Moon Rising	Wolfmother	Australia
76	11th Dimension	Julian Casablancas	United States
77	She's a Genius	Jet	Australia
78	Remember Me (Note: The song "Remember Me" by Blue Boy charted in the countdown for the second time after a cover by Tame Impala featured at No. 78. The original version charted at No. 91 in 1997.)	Tame Impala	Australia
79	Getting Wise	Yves Klein Blue	Australia
80	Holiday	Dizzee Rascal	United Kingdom
81	The Cave	Mumford & Sons	United Kingdom
82	Sometimes	Miami Horror	Australia
83	Raindrops	Basement Jaxx	United Kingdom
84	United States of Eurasia	Muse	United Kingdom
85	Underdog	Kasabian	United Kingdom
86	Too Many Dicks (On the Dance Floor)	Flight of the Conchords	New Zealand
87	The Darkest Side	The Middle East	Australia
88	Creeping Out Sara	NOFX	United States
89	D.O.A. (Death of Auto-Tune)	Jay-Z	United States
90	Kiss with a Fist	Florence & the Machine	United Kingdom
91	I've Got Friends	Manchester Orchestra	United States
92	Skeleton Boy	Friendly Fires	United Kingdom
93	Thump	Bertie Blackman	Australia
94	Blue Lips	Regina Spektor	United States
95	Panic Switch	Silversun Pickups	United States
96	Ghosts 'n' Stuff	Deadmau5 featuring Rob Swire	Canada/Australia
97	Laughing With	Regina Spektor	United States
98	New Fang	Them Crooked Vultures	United States
99	Hell	Tegan & Sara	Canada
100	Wheels	Foo Fighters	United States

=== #101–#200 List ===
On 31 January 2010, Richard Kingsmill revealed the "second 100 songs" (#101–#200) list on his blog.

#	Song	Artist	Country of origin
101	(Ain't) Telling the Truth	Bluejuice	Australia
102	Dominos	The Big Pink	United Kingdom
103	Comeback	Grinspoon	Australia
104	Clean White Love	Lisa Mitchell	Australia
105	For Emma	Bon Iver	United States
106	Ready for the Weekend	Calvin Harris	United Kingdom
107	The Reeling	Passion Pit	United States
108	That Look You Give That Guy	Eels	United States
109	On Tour	Bliss n Eso	Australia
110	Out the Airlock	Paul Dempsey	Australia
111	Little Did I Know	Funkoars featuring Ash Grunwald	Australia
112	Cornerstone	Arctic Monkeys	United Kingdom
113	Auditorium	Mos Def featuring Slick Rick	United States
114	Gimme Sympathy	Metric	Canada
115	Scattered Diamonds	Hungry Kids of Hungary	Australia
116	Romeo and Juliet (Like a Version)	Lisa Mitchell	Australia
117	Kiss of Life	Friendly Fires	United Kingdom
118	The Light You Burned	Hilltop Hoods featuring Trials	Australia
119	Daniel	Bat for Lashes	United Kingdom
120	Heart	Bertie Blackman	Australia
121	The Space on the Wall	Dead Letter Circus	Australia
122	Bruises	Chairlift	United States
123	Without You	Empire of the Sun	Australia
124	Bird on a Wire	Sarah Blasko	Australia
125	Hollywood	Art vs. Science	Australia
126	Where Yah From	Drapht	Australia
127	Simple Boy	Karnivool	Australia
128	Fast Friends	Paul Dempsey	Australia
129	I Remember	Deadmau5 and Kaskade	Canada/United States
130	Shining Down	Lupe Fiasco featuring Matthew Santos	United States
131	The Girl and the Robot	Röyksopp	Norway
132	Gold Guns Girls	Metric	Canada
133	Lasso	Phoenix	France
134	Let's Go Surfing	The Drums	United States
135	Battle for the Sun	Placebo	United Kingdom
136	Goliath	Karnivool	Australia
137	Anyway	Duck Sauce	United States
138	Run	Grinspoon	Australia
139	Sex From the Bong (Like a Version) (Note: Mash up of Sex on Fire by Kings of Leon and Hits from the Bong by Cypress Hill)	Something with Numbers	Australia
140	Audience	Cold War Kids	United States
141	Down River	The Temper Trap	Australia
142	For What It's Worth	Placebo	United Kingdom
143	Head, First, Down	Whitley	Australia
144	The Start of War	Clare Bowditch & the New Slang	Australia
145	Fresh Blood	Eels	United States
146	Heartbreak Scorsese	Snob Scrilla	Australia
147	Mind Eraser, No Chaser	Them Crooked Vultures	United States
148	Young Cardinals	Alexisonfire	Canada
149	Under Pressure (Like a Version)	Ben Harper & Relentless7	United States
150	Lay It Down	Peter Bjorn & John	Sweden
151	Crystalised	The xx	United Kingdom
152	One Life Stand	Hot Chip	United Kingdom
153	It's Nice to Know You Work Alone	Silversun Pickups	United States
154	Sigh No More	Mumford & Sons	United Kingdom
155	Mexican Mavis	Boy & Bear	Australia
156	Chaka Demus	Jamie T	United Kingdom
157	Dirtee Cash	Dizzee Rascal	United Kingdom
158	Hairdo	Little Birdy	Australia
159	Summarize	Little Birdy	Australia
160	Tigerlily	La Roux	United Kingdom
161	So Human	Lady Sovereign	United Kingdom
162	Spaceship	Phrase	Australia
163	No Turning Back	Sarah Blasko	Australia
164	While You Wait for the Others	Grizzly Bear	United States
165	White Feather	Wolfmother	Australia
166	The Price	Dappled Cities	Australia
167	Medicate	AFI	United States
168	I'm Not Your Toy	La Roux	United Kingdom
169	Gifted	N.A.S.A. featuring Kanye West, Santigold, and Lykke Li	United States/Sweden
170	Gold Canary	Cloud Control	Australia
171	How to Tame Lions	Washington	Australia
172	I'm Going to Kill You	Philadelphia Grand Jury	Australia
173	Unnatural Selection	Muse	United Kingdom
174	Vlad the Impaler	Kasabian	United Kingdom
175	A Community Service Announcement	Jonathan Boulet	Australia
176	Quicksand	La Roux	United Kingdom
177	No One Loves Me & Neither Do I	Them Crooked Vultures	United States
178	Sick Muse	Metric	Canada
179	Ordinary	Red Riders	Australia
180	Inshalla	Eskimo Joe	Australia
181	I Belong to You (+Mon Cœur S'ouvre a ta Voix)	Muse	United Kingdom
182	There's No Secrets This Year	Silversun Pickups	United States
183	Moth's Wings	Passion Pit	United States
184	Black Cats	Bertie Blackman	Australia
185	Sundown Syndrome	Tame Impala	Australia
186	White Blank Page	Mumford & Sons	United Kingdom
187	Change	Daniel Merriweather featuring Wale	Australia/United States
188	All Is Love	Karen O and The Kids	United States
189	Fifty in Five	Hilltop Hoods	Australia
190	Percussion Gun	White Rabbits	United States
191	You've Got the Love	Florence & the Machine	United Kingdom
192	So Jealous	Lisa Mitchell	Australia
193	MK Ultra	Muse	United Kingdom
194	Sunny Afternoon (Like a Version)	The Cat Empire	Australia
195	With This Ship	The Basics	Australia
196	Bounce	MSTRKRFT featuring N.O.R.E. and Isis	Canada/United States
197	Oh! Hark!	Lisa Mitchell	Australia
198	Hillatoppa	Hilltop Hoods	Australia
199	Back to the Start	Lily Allen	United Kingdom
200	Shruggin	Urthboy featuring Jane Tyrrell	Australia

== Artists with multiple entries ==
#	Artist	Tracks
4	Muse	9, 19, 35, 84
4	Florence and the Machine (Note: Florence and the Machine's four tracks is the equal highest total from a female artist. Lily Allen set the record in 2006)	10, 44, 45, 90
3	Kasabian	17, 51, 85
3	The Temper Trap	21, 48, 58
3	Flight of the Conchords	24, 30, 86
3	Sia (Note: Twice solo (50, 72), once with Flight of the Conchords (24))	24, 50, 72
2	Mumford & Sons	1, 81
2	Art vs. Science	2, 74
2	Hilltop Hoods	3, 37
2	Phoenix	4, 13
2	La Roux	6, 27
2	Lily Allen	8, 60
2	Yeah Yeah Yeahs	11, 25
2	Dizzee Rascal	12, 80
2	Passion Pit	20, 38
2	Vampire Weekend	22, 52
2	The Bloody Beetroots	23, 43
2	Sarah Blasko	28, 29
2	Karnivool	47, 63
2	Bertie Blackman	71, 93
2	The Middle East	64, 87
2	Regina Spektor	94, 97
2	Dave Grohl (Note: Once with Them Crooked Vultures (98) once with the Foo Fighters (100))	98, 100

== Countries represented ==
Country	#
Australia (Note: The 37 Australian songs is the fewest since 1997.)	38
United Kingdom	29
United States (Note: This was the first countdown to not feature an artist from the United States in the top 10.)	28
Canada	4
New Zealand	3
France	2
Italy	2
Sweden	1
Brazil	1

== Top 20 Albums of 2009 ==
Bold indicates Hottest 100 winner. Sarah Blasko won the J Award for As Day Follows Night.

#	Artist	Album	Country of origin	Tracks in the Hottest 100
1	Phoenix	Wolfgang Amadeus Phoenix	France	4, 13
2	The Temper Trap	Conditions	Australia	21, 48, 58
3	Muse	The Resistance	United Kingdom	9, 19, 35, 84
4	**Mumford & Sons**	**Sigh No More**	**United Kingdom**	**1, 81**
5	Florence and the Machine	Lungs	United Kingdom	10, 44, 45, 90
6	Sarah Blasko	As Day Follows Night	Australia	28, 29
7	Yeah Yeah Yeahs	It's Blitz!	United States	11, 25
8	Paul Dempsey	Everything Is True	Australia	32
9	Lisa Mitchell	Wonder	Australia	7 (91 in 2008)
10	Passion Pit	Manners	United States	20, 38
11	Lily Allen	It's Not Me, It's You	United Kingdom	8, 60 (46, 90 in 2008)
12	Kasabian	West Ryder Pauper Lunatic Asylum	United Kingdom	17, 51, 85
13	Hilltop Hoods	State of the Art	Australia	3, 37
14	La Roux	La Roux	United Kingdom	6, 27
15	Metric	Fantasies	Canada	26
16	Arctic Monkeys	Humbug	United Kingdom	54
17	Karnivool	Sound Awake	Australia	47, 63
18	Bertie Blackman	Secrets & Lies	Australia	71, 93
19	Grizzly Bear	Veckatimest	United States	61
20	Them Crooked Vultures	Them Crooked Vultures	United States	98

Countries Represented in the 2009 Triple J Album Poll
Country	#
Australia	7
United Kingdom	7
United States	4
France	1
Canada	1

== CD release ==
Triple J's Hottest 100 Volume 17 is the compilation featuring the best of the Top 100 voted tracks on two CDs.

CD 1
1. Mumford & Sons – "Little Lion Man" (#1)
2. Phoenix – "Lisztomania" (#4)
3. Art vs. Science – Parlez Vous Français?" (#2)
4. La Roux – "Bulletproof" (#6)
5. Muse – "Uprising" (#9)
6. "Hilltop Hoods" – Chase That Feeling (#3)
7. Gossip – "Heavy Cross" (#16)
8. Bluejuice – "Broken Leg" (#5)
9. John Butler Trio – "One Way Road" (#39)
10. Kasabian – "Fire" (#17)
11. Florence and the Machine – "Dog Days Are Over" (#10)
12. Miike Snow – "Animal" (#53)
13. Simian Mobile Disco feat. Chris Keating – "Audacity of Huge" (#41)
14. Lisa Mitchell – "Coin Laundry" (#7)
15. Weezer – "(If You're Wondering If I Want You To) I Want You To" (#36)
16. Powderfinger – "All of the Dreamers" (#49)
17. The Middle East – "Blood" (#64)
18. The xx – "Islands" (#56)
19. Kid Cudi feat. MGMT & Ratatat – "Pursuit of Happiness" (#33)
20. Bag Raiders – "Shooting Stars" (#18)
21. Sia – "Buttons (CSS Remix)" (#50)
CD 2
1. Dizzee Rascal & Armand Van Helden – "Bonkers" (#12)
2. Yeah Yeah Yeahs – "Heads Will Roll" (#11)
3. Vampire Weekend – "Cousins" (#22)
4. Passion Pit – "Sleepyhead" (#20)
5. Edward Sharpe and the Magnetic Zeros – "Home" (#15)
6. Lily Allen – "Not Fair" (#8)
7. Paul Dempsey – "Ramona Was a Waitress" (#32)
8. The Temper Trap – "Fader" (#21)
9. The Bloody Beetroots feat. Steve Aoki – "Warp 1.9" (#23)
10. Karnivool – "Set Fire to the Hive" (#47)
11. Metric – "Help I'm Alive" (#26)
12. Sarah Blasko – "We Won't Run" (#28)
13. Seth Sentry – "The Waitress Song" (#31)
14. Grizzly Bear – "Two Weeks" (#61)
15. Basement Jaxx – "Raindrops" (#83)
16. Miami Horror – "Sometimes" (#82)
17. Philadelphia Grand Jury – "The Good News" (#57)
18. Jamie T – "Sticks 'n' Stones" (#14)
19. Arctic Monkeys – "Crying Lightning" (#54)
20. Washington – "Cement" (#67)
21. Animal Collective – "My Girls" (#70)

=== DVD Release ===
1. Mumford & Sons – "Little Lion Man" (#1)
2. Art vs. Science – Parlez Vous Français?" (#2)
3. "Hilltop Hoods" – Chase That Feeling (#3)
4. Phoenix – "Lisztomania" (#4)
5. Bluejuice – "Broken Leg" (#5)
6. La Roux – "Bulletproof" (#6)
7. Lisa Mitchell – "Coin Laundry" (#7)
8. Lily Allen – "Not Fair" (#8)
9. Muse – "Uprising" (#9)
10. Florence and the Machine – "Dog Days Are Over" (#10)
11. Yeah Yeah Yeahs – "Heads Will Roll" (#11)
12. Dizzee Rascal & Armand Van Helden – "Bonkers" (#12)
13. Jamie T – "Sticks 'n' Stones" (#14)
14. Gossip – "Heavy Cross" (#16)
15. Kasabian – "Fire" (#17)
16. Bag Raiders – "Shooting Stars" (#18)
17. Passion Pit – "Sleepyhead" (#20)
18. The Temper Trap – "Fader" (#21)
19. Vampire Weekend – "Cousins" (#22)
20. The Bloody Beetroots feat. Steve Aoki – "Warp 1.9" (#23)
21. Metric – "Help I'm Alive" (#26)
22. Sarah Blasko – "We Won't Run" (#28)
23. Seth Sentry – "The Waitress Song" (#31)
24. Paul Dempsey – "Ramona Was a Waitress" (#32)
25. Kid Cudi feat. MGMT & Ratatat – "Pursuit of Happiness" (#33)
26. Little Birdy – "Brother" (#34)
27. Weezer – "(If You're Wondering If I Want You To) I Want You To" (#36)
28. John Butler Trio – "One Way Road" (#39)
29. Angus & Julia Stone – "And the Boys" (#40)
30. Simian Mobile Disco feat. Chris Keating – "Audacity of Huge" (#41)
31. British India – "Vanilla" (#42)
32. Karnivool – "Set Fire to the Hive" (#47)
33. Powderfinger – "All of the Dreamers" (#49)
34. Sia – "Buttons" (#50)
35. Miike Snow – "Animal" (#53)
36. Arctic Monkeys – "Crying Lightning" (#54)
37. Philadelphia Grand Jury – "The Good News" (#57)
38. Bertie Blackman – "Byrds of Prey" (#71)
39. Bloc Party – "One More Chance" (#62)
40. Grizzly Bear – "Two Weeks" (#61)
41. The Middle East – "Blood" (#64)
42. Animal Collective – "My Girls" (#70)
