= Brother (Little Birdy song) =

Single by Little Birdy

from the album Confetti
- Released: April 2009
- Genre: Indie rock
- Length: 3:39:00
- Label: Eleven/Universal
- Songwriter(s): Katy Steele
- Producer(s): Steve Schram, Little Birdy

Little Birdy singles chronology
"After Dark" (2007)	"Brother" (2009)	"Summarize" (2009)

"Brother" is the first single released from Australian indie rock band Little Birdy's third studio album, Confetti. The song reached No. 90 on the Australian Singles Chart, and polled at No. 34 on the Triple J Hottest 100 of 2009. Originally offered as a free download, the song is also the fifth track on the "Summarize" single.

== Background ==
The song is written by singer and guitarist Katy Steele and features Paul Kelly on backing vocals and harmonica, but for live performances and in the music video for the song, bassist Scott ('Barney') O'Donoghue plays the harmonica.

The experience of working with Paul just reminded me of why he’s such a legend. It wasn’t like he just rocked up to the studio to do a session – he really poured everything into it. We kinda felt like he joined our band for that day and that was a pretty great feeling.

— Katy Steele

The song, according to Matt Chequer, was a last minute addition to the album while the band recorded at Melbourne's Sing Sing Studios.

Brother was one of the later songs Katy wrote, but she didn’t actually think it was that good. She showed us late one afternoon when we’d had a bit of a crap day. She said, 'Ah, well I’ve got this song' and we were all blown away by it. We recorded it there and then and it pretty much stayed like that for the album. I thought the song would sound good with a harmonica on it, but we didn’t really know anyone who could play harmonica apart from Paul Kelly. Katy gave him a call to see if he’d be interested. He was up for it and in town, so it worked really well. I dunno what it is about their two voices, because separately you’d think that they wouldn’t work, but they do sound really lovely together I think.

— Matt Chequer

In an interview on Triple J when Steele was queried whether the song was about her brother Luke, she responded "It's about a lot of things. I don't write songs about one thing. I mean yeah, obviously the first line is about him but y'know the second line is about my Dad and the third line's about my Mama. It's really just about family."

== Track listing ==
All tracks are written by Katy Steele

Brother
No.	Title	Length
1.	"Brother"	3:39

== Charts ==
Chart performance for "Brother"
Chart (2009)	Peak position
Australia (ARIA)	90
