= Excited (Little Birdy song) =

Single by Little Birdy

from the album BigBigLove
- Released: 18 April 2005
- Genre: Alternative rock
- Length: 3:39
- Label: Virgin/EMI
- Songwriter(s): Katy Steele
- Producer(s): Paul McKercher

Little Birdy singles chronology
| "Tonight's the Night" (2005) | "Excited" (2005) | "Come On Come On" (2006) |

"Excited" is the third single from Australian indie rock band Little Birdy's debut album, BigBigLove, released on 18 April 2005. It was produced by Paul McKercher at Big Jesus Burger Studios, and mixed at Studios 301.

"Excited" reached number 44 on the Australian ARIA Singles Charts.

The B-side of the single includes a live version of "Beautiful to Me" recorded at the 2005 Big Day Out, a short experimental noise track, "Definition" and a version of the Lee Hazlewood song "These Boots Are Made for Walkin'".

== Critical reception ==
The Oz Music Project felt that it was "a catchy-enough song, with menacing guitars crunching in each ear. However, central to the equation are Steele’s impish vocals. Without her singing – pushed to its limits, thin in the high registers, but always communicative – the song would be a generic grunge-lite song."

Carmine Pascuzzi at Mediasearch considers that Katy Steele's vocals "could be something of an acquired taste" she has "admired the tenacious way in which they deliver their music." In her review of the single she stated "they impress again with ‘Excited’. It’s slightly darker than some of their previously sweeter tracks. The extra depth allows Katy’s vocals to expand into a soaring escape."

Australian music publication, FasterLouder, describes "Excited", with its indie guitar groove and Steele’s wrought singing style, as "setting the tone well for the rest of the album."

== Track listing ==
All tracks are written by Katy Steele, except as shown

"Excited" single track listing
| No. | Title | Length |
|---|---|---|
| 1. | "Excited" | 3:39 |
| 2. | "Definition" | 0:48 |
| 3. | "These Boots are Made for Walking" (Lee Hazlewood) | 2:31 |
| 4. | "Beautiful to Me (Live)" | 3:54 |

== Charts ==
Chart performance for "Excited"
| Chart (2005) | Peak position |
|---|---|
| Australia (ARIA) | 44 |
