= Miles Brown (musician) =

Australian musician, composer and producer (born 1978)

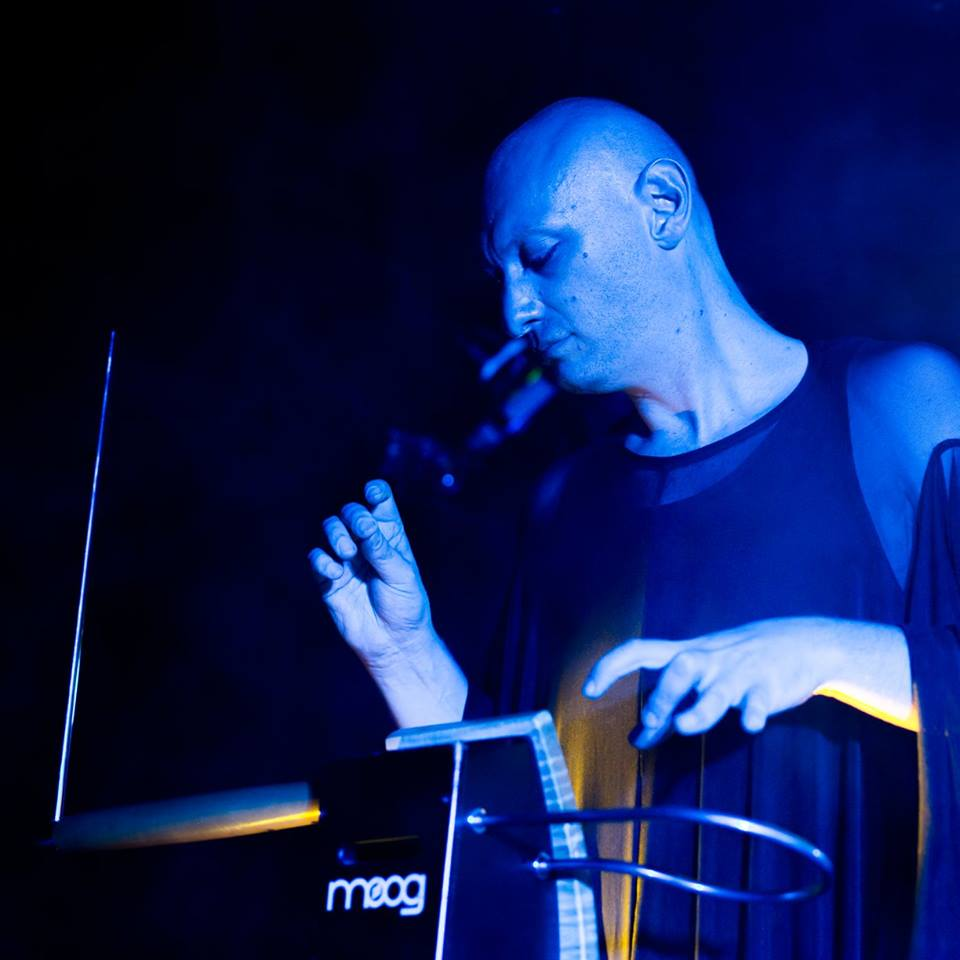
- Brown in 2016

Background information
- Born: 4 January 1978 (age 48)
- Origin: Hobart, Tasmania, Australia
- Genres: Electronic, progressive rock, synthwave, synthpop, experimental, industrial, film score
- Occupations: Musician, composer, performer, producer, curator, sound artist
- Instruments: Theremin, analogue synthesizer, electric bass, pipe organ, vocals, electronics
- Years active: 1995–present
- Labels: Death Waltz Recording Company, Mondo, It Records, Twisted Nerve Australia, Homeless, Exo, Denovali Records, Trendkill, Seed Records, Unstable Ape Records, Nosferatunes
- Website: milesbrown.com.au

Miles Brown (born 4 January 1978) is an Australian theremin player, composer, multi-instrumentalist, producer, music curator and sound artist. Best known for his work with Australian instrumental electronic act The Night Terrors, Brown has also performed with Lou Reed, Laurie Anderson, Goblin, Black Mountain, Mick Harvey, Alexander Hacke, Danielle de Picciotto, Bardo Pond, Heirs and The Narcoleptor.

== Biography ==
Brown was born in Hobart, Tasmania, and developed his practice in the experimental art rock scene of Melbourne. He is a student of Russian theremin virtuosa Lydia Kavina, the first cousin twice removed of Léon Theremin (the inventor of the instrument).

With his band The Night Terrors, Brown has explored the theremin as a lead instrument in an electronic progressive rock scenario. The Night Terrors have released four albums and have toured with Hawkwind, Goblin, Melt-Banana, Serena-Maneesh and Black Mountain. The Night Terrors are often described as horror film soundtrack music.

Brown has also worked with Australian experimental industrial band Heirs, touring Europe and Australia supporting Alcest, Primordial and Årabrot, and contributing to the records Fowl (2010) and Hunter (2011).

In May 2014, Brown was commissioned by the City of Melbourne to compose an album of music for the Melbourne Town Hall's Grand pipe organ, the largest grand romantic organ in the Southern Hemisphere. Pavor Nocturnus: Composition for Grand Organ, Theremin, Electronics and Percussion was performed by The Night Terrors, recorded on Friday the 13th of July and launched on Halloween 31 October 2014. The album was released by the label Twisted Nerve Australia, a joint imprint between Dual Planet and UK producer / music archivist Andy Votel. A special edition was released by UK cult movie soundtrack label Death Waltz Recording Company / Mondo

Brown’s debut solo album, Séance Fiction, was released in 2015 on Death Waltz and It Records. His solo material explores the theremin and analogue synthesiser in the realms of dark wave, gothic disco and cosmic electronics.

In 2019, Brown debuted The Narcoleptor – his new experimental collaboration with classical harpist and vocalist Mary Doumany. The Narcoleptor's debut EP was released that year on Nosferatunes Records.

Brown's sophomore solo album, The Gateway, was released by Death Waltz in 2020 to celebrate with the 100th anniversary of the theremin. The Gateway features a contemporary expansion of the classic theremin sound in the style of 'gothic sci-fi techno'. Brown plays the Moog Etherwave Pro theremin, employing both its familiar heterodyne voicing and controlling analogue synthesisers via CV.

In 2021, The Narcoleptor released their debut LP Transmogrification on Nosferatunes. The album explores the microtonal capacities of theremin, analogue electronics, post-Celtic lever harp and voice.

In 2023, The Night Terrors reunited to release their fourth album, Hypnotica: Composition for Theremin and Electronic Music Synthesizer, on Disdain Records. A departure from their previous work, this album focuses on the unique emotional capabilities of theremin in an ethereal electronic darkwave context.

Brown played theremin on the soundtrack to Australian supernatural horror film Late Night with the Devil (2023), written and directed by Colin and Cameron Cairnes, starring David Dastmalchian.

== Discography ==
=== Solo ===
- 2020: The Gateway – Death Waltz Originals
- 2019: Shudder Speed (single) – Nosferatunes
- 2015: Séance Fiction – Death Waltz Originals / Mondo / It Records
- 2014: Electrics (single) – It Records

=== The Night Terrors ===
- 2023: Hypnotica: Composition for Theremin and Electronic Music Synthesizer - Disdain Records
- 2014: Pavor Nocturnus: Composition for Grand Organ, Theremin, Electronics and Percussion – Twisted Nerve Australia
- 2014: Spiral Vortex – Homeless
- 2012: Monster / Lasers For Eyes (12" EP) – OSCL / Seed Records
- 2009: Back To Zero – Exo / Trendkill / Homeless
- 2003: Lightless – Unstable Ape Records
- 2002: The Night Terrors – Unstable Ape Records

=== The Narcoleptor ===
- 2021: Transmogrification LP – Nosferatunes
- 2019: The Narcoleptor 12" EP – Nosferatunes

=== Studio collaborations ===
- 2022: Grace Cummings – 'Fly A Kite' – Storm Queen - ATO Records
- 2019: Black Lung – 'NXIVM II' – NXIVM – Ant-Zen
- 2019: Jess Ribeiro w/ Mick Harvey – Wildflowers – Remote Control
- 2019: Cat Hope / Monash Art Ensemble 'The Dark Hip Falls' – Here Now Hear – FMR Records
- 2013: Sankt Otten – 'Mach bitte, dass es leiser wird' – Messias Maschine – Denovali
- 2011: Antoni Maiovvi – 'Murderfunk Night Terrors Remix' –Trial By Bullet – Seed Records
- 2011: Heirs – Hunter – Denovali / OSCL
- 2010: Heirs – Fowl – Denovali
- 2009: Little Birdy – Confetti – Universal Music

== Film scores ==
- 2019: Volatilis (with The Narcoleptor) directed by Jenna Eriksen
- 2016: Dark Whispers – Volume 1 (anthology), segment: Watch Me, directed by Briony Kidd
- 2015: Our Extra Sensory Selves, directed by Allison Gibbs – Centre for Contemporary Arts, Glasgow, UK
- 2015: Insomnolence, directed by Kiefer Findlow

== Live scores ==
- 2023: The Narcoleptor - Nosferatu – Eine Symphonie des Grauens (1922), directed by F. W. Murnau - Monster Fest, Melbourne
- 2017: Crossing – with Unconscious Collective, House of Vnholy, J. P. Shilo, Alexander Hacke and Danielle de Picciotto, Dark Mofo, Tasmania.
- 2017: RE(PURPOSE): THE MVMNT – with Natalie Abbott, Dancehouse (Melbourne)
- 2015: Miles Brown & Drill Folly – The Seashell and the Clergyman, directed by Germaine Dulac – Fabrica Gallery, Brighton, UK

== Videos ==
- "Levitation" from The Night Terrors - Hypnotica: Composition for Theremin and Electronic Music Synthesizer (2023), directed by bl00dsp0rts
- "Speaking In Tongues" from The Gateway (2020), directed by bl00dsp0rts
- "Shudder Speed" single (2019), directed by Geoffrey O'Connor
- "I (excerpt)" from The Narcoleptor EP (2019), directed by Jenna Eriksen
- "Feeder" from Séance Fiction (2015), directed by Agostino Soldati
- "Apparition" from Séance Fiction (2015), directed by Agostino Soldati
- "Megafauna" from The Night Terrors – Pavor Nocturnus: Composition for Grand Organ, Theremin, Electronics and Percussion (2014), directed by Agostino Soldati
- "Hunter" from Heirs – Hunter (2012), directed by Brent Stegeman and Damian Coward
