= Marx and Venus =

- Genre: Comedy
- Created by: Geoffrey Atherden
- Starring: Bryce Youngman; Rhoda Lopez
- Opening theme: Little Birdy's "Come on Come on"
- Country of origin: Australia
- Original language: English
- No. of seasons: 1
- No. of episodes: 25

Production
- Executive producer: Sue Taylor
- Producers: Natalie Bell; Ian Booth; Francesca Strano
- Running time: 5 minutes
- Production company: Taylor Media Pty Ltd

Original release
- Network: SBS TV
- Release: 6 August 2007 – 11 February 2008

Marx and Venus was an Australian television comedy series broadcast on SBS TV. Set in Perth, Western Australia, the program was about two flatmates; John Marx, played by Bryce Youngman and Venus Hoy, played by Rhoda Lopez. Originally Emma Lung was to play Venus Hoy, but she pulled out of the project before filming.

The program premiered on 6 August 2007. Episodes of the show are only five minutes long, and it was generally shown around 8:30pm each Monday night.

The theme music for the opening titles is "Come on Come on" by Little Birdy.
