= Bodies (Little Birdy song) =

Single by Little Birdy

from the album Hollywood
- Released: 23 January 2007
- Genre: Indie rock
- Length: 3:46
- Label: Eleven; EMI
- Songwriter(s): Katy Steele
- Producer(s): John King

Little Birdy singles chronology
"Come On Come On" (2006)	"Bodies" (2007)	"After Dark" (2007)

"Bodies" is a song by Little Birdy from their second album, Hollywood. The song was the second single released from the album, and the fifth in the band's history. The single was released on 23 January 2007. "Bodies" peaked at number 68 on the ARIA Charts.

The single included four B-sides, including: "Beware Wolf", a cover of a song by a fellow Perth band Gyroscope, and a remix of "Hollywood", by Damien Crosby, from another Perth band The Panda Band.

An additional B-side titled "Clear It Out" was also slated for release on the single but did not appear. It was later briefly available on the band's MySpace page.

In the New South Wales State Parliament in March 2009, the Hon. Robyn Parker cited the song as highlighting

the guilt women feel for having normal healthy bodies that are not of model size and the wish for acceptance of women just as they are.

— Robyn Parker

== Track listing ==
1. "Bodies" (radio version) – 3:46
2. "Beware Wolf" – 3:31
3. "Hollywood" (remix) – 3:08
4. "Come on Come On" (alternative version) – 2:54
5. "Bodies" (demo) – 4:06

== Charts ==
Chart performance for "Bodies"
Chart (2007)	Peak position
Australia (ARIA)	68
