= Mind Eraser =

Mind Eraser may refer to:

- Mind Eraser (roller coaster), a suspended looping roller coaster at several parks
- The Mind Eraser (Geauga Lake), a Flying Cobra boomerang roller coaster
- "Mind Eraser", a song by The Black Keys from the 2011 album El Camino
- "Mind Eraser", a 2018 single by CRUISR
- "Mind Eraser, No Chaser", a 2009 song by Them Crooked Vultures
- Mind Eraser, a variation of the Black Russian cocktail
