= Beautiful to Me =

Beautiful to Me may refer to:

- "Beautiful to Me" (Little Birdy song)
- "Beautiful to Me" (Olly Murs song)
- "Beautiful to Me" (Shane Filan song)
