= Little Birdy (EP) =

EP by Little Birdy
- Released: 6 October 2003
- Genre: Alternative rock; indie rock
- Length: 16:30
- Label: Eleven; EMI

Little Birdy chronology
Little Birdy (2003)	This Is a Love Song (2004)

Singles from Little Birdy
- 1. "Relapse" Released: 2003; 2. "Baby Blue" Released: 2003

Little Birdy is the debut EP by Australian indie rock band Little Birdy. The EP was co-produced by Little Birdy with Andy Lawson, Joel Quartermain, and Rodney Aravena from Perth's Debaser Studios. It was released after their 2003 Kiss My WAMi win for "Best New Band" and "Best Female Vocalist", and just in time to coincide with East Coast appearances at Livid.

== Commercial performance ==
"Relapse" which reached the number 1 most requested song on Triple J's Net 50. and was voted as number 16 song of 2003 on the Triple J Hottest 100, with "Baby Blue" coming in at number 25. "Relapse" was also nominated in the 2004 ARIA Awards "Breakthrough Artist—Single" category. The EP reached a peak of number 27 on the Australian ARIA Singles Charts. "I Should Have Known" (originally packaged under the name "I Should of Known") was later re-recorded as "Andy Warhol" for their debut album BigBigLove, as was "Relapse".

== Track listing ==
No.	Title	Length
1.	"Relapse"	3:37
2.	"Baby Blue"	4:01
3.	"Too Late"	3:15
4.	"I Should Have Known"	5:37

== Charts ==
Chart performance for Little Birdy
Chart (2003)	Peak position
Australia (ARIA)	27
