= Tonight's the Night (Little Birdy song) =

Single by Little Birdy

from the album BigBigLove
- Released: 29 November 2004
- Genre: Indie rock
- Length: 3:44
- Label: Eleven
- Songwriters: K. Steele, M. Chequer
- Producer: Paul McKercher

Little Birdy singles chronology
"'Beautiful to Me'" (2004)	"Tonight's the Night" (2004)	"'Excited'" (2005)

"Tonight's the Night" is the second single from Little Birdy's debut album BigBigLove and was released 29 November 2004 by Eleven and distributed by Virgin/EMI. The song appeared at No. 76 on the ARIA Singles Chart Top 100. Like the other tracks on the album it was produced by Paul McKercher at Big Jesus Burger Studios and mixed at Studios 301.

The single's title track proves Katy Steele's knack for penning Bacharach-esque hooks is undeniable .. they sound classic but not retro.

The main thing that I wanted to do with this record was to have as much classic, memorable melody as possible. The songs are all based on feelings and emotion, for each song had a particular vision"

— Katy Steele 2004.

"Tonight's the Night" features the addition of a fifth member, guitarist and keyboardist Fergus Deasy (touring guitarist with Eskimo Joe). Accompanying the single is two remixes of Losing You and a demo of Forever - the original versions of which both appear on BigBigLove. The Blurb's Evan Alexander, described the song as "a fair offering from this newly hyped Perth four piece [and its] jingle jangle chords punctuate a stuttered intro before Katy Steele’s breathy vocal kick the forefront in". In an interview with the Sydney Morning Herald, guitarist, Simon Leach, describes the song as old school with a 1980s influence.

"Tonight's the Night" has got that really '80s pop thing, with the keys and the arpeggios.

— Simon Leach, October 2004

"Tonight's the Night" reached No. 78 on the Triple J Hottest 100 for 2004.

== Track listing ==
No.	Title	Writer(s)	Length
1.	"Tonight's the Night" (mixed by Paul Kercher)	K. Steele, M. Chequer	3:44
2.	"Losing You (Sanskrit remix edit)" (mixed by Sanskrit)	K. Steele	3:43
3.	"Forever (Demo)" (mixed by Matt Chequer, Rodney Aravena)	K. Steele, S. Leach	3:44
4.	"Losing You (Sanskrit remix)" (mixed by Sanskrit)	K. Steele	6:48

== Charts ==
Chart performance for "Tonight's the Night"
Chart (2004)	Peak position
Australia (ARIA)	76

== Release history ==
Release history and formats for "Tonight's the Night"
Region	Date	Format	Label	Catalog no.
Australia	29 November 2004	CD single	Eleven	ELEVENCD31
Australia	29 November 2004	Digital download	Eleven	
