= Hollywood (Little Birdy album) =

Studio album by Little Birdy
- Released: 13 October 2006
- Genre: Indie rock
- Length: 47:34
- Label: Eleven / EMI
- Producer: John King

Little Birdy chronology
BigBigLove (2004)	Hollywood (2006)	Confetti (2009)

Singles from Hollywood
- 1. "Come On Come On" Released: 15 September 2006; 2. "Bodies" Released: 23 January 2007; 3. "After Dark" Released: 11 May 2007

Professional ratings
Review scores
Source	Rating
The Dwarf	(favorable)

Hollywood is the second studio album by Australian indie rock band Little Birdy. The album was recorded in Los Angeles and produced by John King of the production duo The Dust Brothers and engineer Clif Norrell.

The first single released from the album was "Come On Come On", which reached number 18 on its debut on the Australian ARIA Singles Charts and was one of the top most requested songs on Triple J.

The second single from the album, "Bodies", was released on 23 January 2007. A limited edition copy of the album was also released with a bonus DVD The Making of Hollywood and the "Come On Come On" video clip.

In March 2007, the album was certified gold by the Australian Recording Industry Association.

== Background ==
"Actually the initial title for the album was actually going to be Inside I’m Crying, Outside I’m Dancing which kind of describes the feeling for the album as a whole but in the end we decided on Hollywood" explains Katy. "I wrote the title song a few weeks before we even starting looking into where to record the album and as far as we knew we were probably going to record somewhere in the UK. It was weird that the song came before we knew we were going there."

"We had pretty much all of the album demo’d before going over to record with John so we were in a much better position mentally than the first album." says drummer Matt.

"I think there was actually a lot less pressure on us this time around. At least this time we knew our audience and knew what to expect, so that made it easier" agrees bassist Scott.

== Release ==
"After Dark" is the third single from Hollywood. It has been described as "a song that hints at the spellbinding nocturnal intrigue of the album as a whole." The videoclip for the song was first aired on ABC TV's rage on 12 May 2007. The videoclip was directed by Paul Goldman, who also directed the videoclip for "Beautiful to Me" and Alice Bell.

== Track listing ==
All lyrics are written by Katy Steele, except "On and On" written by Simon Leach; all music is composed by Little Birdy.

No.	Title	Length
1.	"Hollywood"	1:38
2.	"Come on Come On"	3:53
3.	"Bodies"	3:36
4.	"After Dark"	3:56
5.	"Please Don't Lay Me Down"	4:59
6.	"Music"	3:16
7.	"If I"	3:55
8.	"Somebody New"	4:04
9.	"Better Off Alone"	3:44
10.	"Set You Alight"	3:47
11.	"Don't"	3:37
12.	"Feeding on the Night"	3:31
13.	"On and On"	3:38

== Charts ==
Year	Chart	Peak position
2006	Australian ARIA Albums Chart	#9

=== Certifications ===
Country	Certification	Sales
Australia	Gold	35,000+
