= Summarize =

Single by Little Birdy

from the album Confetti
- Released: 10 April 2009
- Recorded: 2008–2009
- Genre: Rock
- Length: 3:21
- Label: Eleven
- Songwriter: Little Birdy
- Producers: Steve Schram, Little Birdy

Little Birdy singles chronology
"Brother" (2009)	"Summarize" (2009)	"Hairdo" (2009)

"Summarize" was the second single, but the first 'official' single, released from Australian indie rock band Little Birdy's third studio album, Confetti. It was released on 10 April 2009, and the single made it to number 54 on the ARIA charts, reaching No. 10 on the physical singles and No. 8 on the ARIA Australian Artists charts.

Whilst "Summarize" failed to make Triple J's Hottest 100 for 2009, it did make to No. 159 on the "second 100 songs" (#101–#200) list, released by Triple J's Richard Kingsmill.

Two versions were released: a CD single featuring the track "One in a Million", and an iTunes version which featured the track "Sorrow" instead. Additionally, the song "Brother" was moved from Track 5 (CD) to Track 4 (iTunes).

The video was directed by Stephen Lance and Damon Escott, at Head Pictures, and "fuses imagery from the Stax & Motown era with some undeniably post-modern hues".

== Reviews ==
Atavan Halen on Sputnik Music described it as "sweet vintage pop with some infectious horns and perfectly syncopated handclaps."

Patrick Donovan in the Sydney Morning Herald called it "upbeat '60s pop".

Rip it Up magazine stated that it was "right up there as one of their best (and maybe earns some bonus points for the hand claps)."

BMA magazine said that "with its 'Kiss-Kiss Bang-Bang' lyrics is up there with the band’s best".

== Track listing ==
All tracks are written by Little Birdy.

CD single
No.	Title	Length
1.	"Summarize"	3:21
2.	"'Til the Morning"	4:07
3.	"Song for Yasmin"	2:32
4.	"One in a Million"	4:06
5.	"Brother"	3:37

iTunes release
No.	Title	Length
1.	"Summarize"	3:21
2.	"'Til the Morning"	4:07
3.	"Song for Yasmin"	2:32
4.	"Brother"	3:37
5.	"Sorrow"	4:31

== Charts ==
Chart performance for "Summarize"
Chart (2009)	Peak position
Australia (ARIA)	54

== Release history ==
Release history and formats for "Summarize"
Region	Date	Label	Format	Catalogue
Australia	10 April 2009	Eleven	CD	ELEVENCD85
