= Come On Come On (Little Birdy song) =

Single by Little Birdy

from the album Hollywood
- Released: 16 September 2006
- Genre: Indie rock
- Length: 3:54
- Label: Eleven; EMI
- Songwriter(s): Katy Steele
- Producer(s): John King

Little Birdy singles chronology
"Excited" (2005)	"Come On Come On" (2006)	"Bodies" (2006)

"Come On Come On" is the first single from Little Birdy's second album Hollywood and was released on 16 September 2006. The single debuted at No. 18 on the Australia ARIA Singles Chart and polled at No. 11 on Triple J's Hottest 100 for 2006.

“Come On Come On”, as with the other tracks on Hollywood, was recorded in Los Angeles in 2006 with producer John King, one half of the production duo, The Dust Brothers (Beck, Beastie Boys) and engineer Clif Norrell (Weezer, R.E.M., You Am I).

"Come On Come On" is the band's highest-charting single to date. Following the release of the single Little Birdy embarked on a national tour supported by fellow a Western Australian band, One Horse Town.

"Come On Come On" features as the theme for the SBS television series Marx and Venus, which commenced screening in 2007. It was also used in the Underbelly season 1 episode "Luv U 4 Eva" when introducing Andrew Veniamin.

It features three B-sides, including a version of the Split Enz classic "Six Months In a Leaky Boat", which was recorded in 2005 for the compilation album She Will Have Her Way featuring female Australian and New Zealand musicians performing songs written by Neil Finn and Tim Finn, members of Split Enz and Crowded House. This version of Six Months In A Leaky Boat reached No. 96 on Triple J's Hottest 100 for 2005. The single also includes an instrumental song "Music for Love Robots", written by the band's guitarist, Simon Leach.

The music video for "Come On Come On" was produced by Paul Butler and Scott Walton of Fifty Fifty Films (Powderfinger, Pete Murray) and was nominated for 'Most Popular Music Video' at the 2007 Western Australian Music Industry Awards.

== Critical reception ==
Kerrie Nannings (The Program) describes "Come On Come On" as "a catchy; synth-rock tune with Katy’s wrought, plaintive and distinctive vocals being almost an instrument in their own right."

== Track listing ==
All tracks are written by Katy Steele, except as shown

"Come On Come On" single track listing
No.	Title	Length
1.	"Come On Come On"	3:54
2.	"Six Months in a Leaky Boat" (Tim Finn)	3:54
3.	"Music for Love Robots" (Simon Leach)	2:34
4.	"We Are the Ones Who Watch Over You While You Sleep"	3:35

== Charts ==
Chart performance for "Come On Come On"
Chart (2006)	Peak position
Australia (ARIA)	18
