= This Is a Love Song EP =

EP by Little Birdy
- Released: 1 March 2004
- Genre: Indie rock
- Length: 15:04
- Label: Eleven / EMI

Little Birdy chronology
Little Birdy (2003)	This Is a Love Song EP (2004)	BigBigLove (2004)

This Is a Love Song EP is the second EP by Australian indie rock band Little Birdy, and the follow-up to the Little Birdy EP. It was released on 1 March 2004 and debuted at No. 22 on the Australian Singles Chart on 8 March 2004. "This Is a Love Song" polled at No. 40 on Triple J's Hottest 100 of 2004.

== Track listing ==
All tracks are written by Katy Steele, except as shown

No.	Title	Length
1.	"This Is a Love Song"	2:31
2.	"Alright" (Katy Steele, Simon Leach)	3:20
3.	"Bad for You"	3:42
4.	"Sing Me a Lullaby"	2:16
5.	"Now the Rain Is Falling"	3:11

== Charts ==
Year	Chart	Peak position
2004	ARIA Australian Singles Chart	22
