= Them Crooked Vultures (album) =

Studio album by Them Crooked Vultures
- Released: November 13, 2009
- Recorded: January – August 2009
- Studio: Pink Duck Studios (Burbank, California); Chalice Studios (Hollywood, California)
- Genre: Hard rock; alternative rock
- Length: 66:22
- Label: Interscope; DGC; RCA
- Producer: Them Crooked Vultures

Singles from Them Crooked Vultures
- 1. "New Fang" Released: October 26, 2009; 2. "Mind Eraser, No Chaser" Released: November 3, 2009

Them Crooked Vultures is the only studio album by American rock supergroup Them Crooked Vultures. It was released on November 13, 2009. The first single from the album, "New Fang", was released on October 26, 2009, followed by "Mind Eraser, No Chaser" on November 3. The album debuted at number 12 on the Billboard 200, selling 70,000 units in the US in its first week.

== Release history ==
The first single from the album, "New Fang", was released on October 26, 2009. On November 3, 2009, they released their second single, via free download on iTunes, entitled "Mind Eraser, No Chaser". "Dead End Friends" was released as a promotional single on the same day as the album's release.

The album was first released on November 13, 2009, in Ireland, Germany, the Netherlands, Belgium and Australia. It was then released by DGC/Interscope in the United States on November 17, 2009; it was released in the United Kingdom by Columbia a day earlier. Prior to release, the album could be viewed on the band's YouTube channel.

The song "Scumbag Blues" was released as a playable track on the 2010 video games Guitar Hero: Warriors of Rock and Gran Turismo 5, while "Dead End Friends" is playable in Rock Band 3 and featured in Skate 3.

== Reception ==
Professional ratings
Aggregate scores
Source	Rating
AnyDecentMusic?	7.3/10
Metacritic	75/100
Review scores
Source	Rating
AllMusic	4/5 stars
The A.V. Club	B+
Chicago Tribune	3.5/4 stars
Entertainment Weekly	B+
The Guardian	3/5 stars
The Independent	4/5 stars
MSN Music (Consumer Guide)	B−
Pitchfork	6.2/10
Rolling Stone	3.5/5 stars
The Times	4/5 stars

The album received a Metascore of 75 from review aggregator Metacritic, based on 23 critics, indicating generally favorable reviews. Rhapsody deemed it the 19th best album of 2009. Chicago Tribune reviewer Greg Kot was particularly complimentary of the album, giving it a rating of 3.5/4, he said "Nasty riffs and sticky melodies are everywhere". He also praised multi-instrumentalist John Paul Jones, saying his "mastery of texture, whether on funky Clavinet for 'Scumbag Blues,' classical piano on 'Spinning in Daffodils' or slide guitar for 'Reptiles,' is the band's secret weapon".

The A.V. Club's Steven Hyden said the group's album "doesn’t equal the considerable awesomeness of its ancestors (the aforementioned Led Zeppelin, Nirvana and Queens of the Stone Age); it sounds like a second-tier Queens Of The Stone Age record", and that it "could have fit comfortably under Homme’s usual banner". He did however, commend it for being "a hell of a lot of fun" and awarded it a B+, adding "The biggest pleasure of Them Crooked Vultures is hearing three supremely gifted players fall together quickly and easily on songs built on simple riffs that sound like they were made up on a lark five minutes earlier."

David Quantick of BBC gave the album a highly favorable review saying "Their debut album is very good indeed. Released, rather oddly, at virtually the same time as Foo Fighters' new greatest hits collection, this album sounds by and large like QOTSA, as Homme sings and plays guitar, but with – unsurprisingly really – Zeppelin-esque touches. From 'Scumbag Blues', which could have fitted loudly on the second Zep’ album, to the superb single 'No One Loves Me & Neither Do I', which is a distant cousin to 'Trampled Under Foot', this is a proper rock album that's very aware of its roots."

== Track listing ==
All tracks are written by and produced by Them Crooked Vultures.

No.	Title	Length
1.	"No One Loves Me & Neither Do I"	5:10
2.	"Mind Eraser, No Chaser"	4:07
3.	"New Fang"	3:49
4.	"Dead End Friends"	3:15
5.	"Elephants"	6:50
6.	"Scumbag Blues"	4:26
7.	"Bandoliers"	5:42
8.	"Reptiles"	4:16
9.	"Interlude with Ludes"	3:45
10.	"Warsaw or the First Breath You Take After You Give Up"	7:50
11.	"Caligulove"	4:55
12.	"Gunman"	4:45
13.	"Spinning in Daffodils"	7:28

iTunes bonus tracks
No.	Title	Length
14.	"No One Loves Me & Neither Do I" (Live)	5:46
15.	"Gunman" (Live) (pre-order only)	4:59

2010 Japanese deluxe edition bonus CD: Live from Sydney
No.	Title	Length
1.	"No One Loves Me & Neither Do I"	5:55
2.	"Dead End Friends"	3:34
3.	"Scumbag Blues"	7:50
4.	"Elephants"	7:14
5.	"HWY 1"	5:56

== Personnel ==
Them Crooked Vultures

- Josh Homme – vocals, guitars, production
- John Paul Jones – bass guitar, keyboards, piano, clavinet, optigan, mandolin, backing vocals, production
- Dave Grohl – drums, percussion, backing vocals, production

Production personnel

- Alan Moulder – recording, mixing
- Alain Johannes – recording and guitar overdubs on "Dead End Friends", "Reptiles", and "Interlude with Ludes", additional vocals recording
- Justin Smith – recording assistance, also Justin from "Fresh Pots" with Dave Grohl
- Chris Kaysch – mixing assistance
- Brian Gardner – mastering
- Mike Bozzi – mastering assistance

Additional personnel

- Liam Lynch – artwork, graphic design
- Morning Breath – art direction

== Chart positions ==
=== Weekly charts ===
Chart (2009)	Peak position
Australian Albums (ARIA)	4
Austrian Albums (Ö3 Austria)	25
Belgian Albums (Ultratop Flanders)	5
Belgian Albums (Ultratop Wallonia)	21
Canadian Albums (Billboard)	5
Dutch Albums (Album Top 100)	9
Finnish Albums (Suomen virallinen lista)	13
French Albums (SNEP)	38
German Albums (Offizielle Top 100)	13
Italian Albums (FIMI)	86
Irish Albums (IRMA)	16
New Zealand Albums (RMNZ)	2
Norwegian Albums (VG-lista)	5
Scottish Albums (OCC)	12
Spanish Albums (Promusicae)	59
Swedish Albums (Sverigetopplistan)	33
Swiss Albums (Schweizer Hitparade)	10
UK Albums (OCC)	13
US Billboard 200	12
US Top Rock Albums (Billboard)	4

Chart (2010)	Peak position
Croatian International Albums (HDU)	5
Danish Albums (Hitlisten)	22
Greek Albums (IFPI)	35
Mexican Albums (Top 100 Mexico)	84

=== Year-end charts ===
Chart (2009)	Position
Australian Albums (ARIA)	66
New Zealand Albums (RMNZ)	46
UK Albums (OCC)	107

Chart (2010)	Position
Belgian Albums (Ultratop Flanders)	60
Dutch Albums (Album Top 100)	95
UK Albums (OCC)	197
US Billboard 200	111
US Top Rock Albums (Billboard)	30

== Certifications ==
Region	Certification	Certified units/sales
Australia (ARIA)	Gold	35,000^{^}
Canada (Music Canada)	Platinum	80,000^{^}
New Zealand (RMNZ)	Gold	7,500^{^}
United Kingdom (BPI)	Gold	100,000^{*}
^{*} Sales figures based on certification alone.^{^} Shipments figures based on certification alone.
