= Them Crooked Vultures =

American rock supergroup

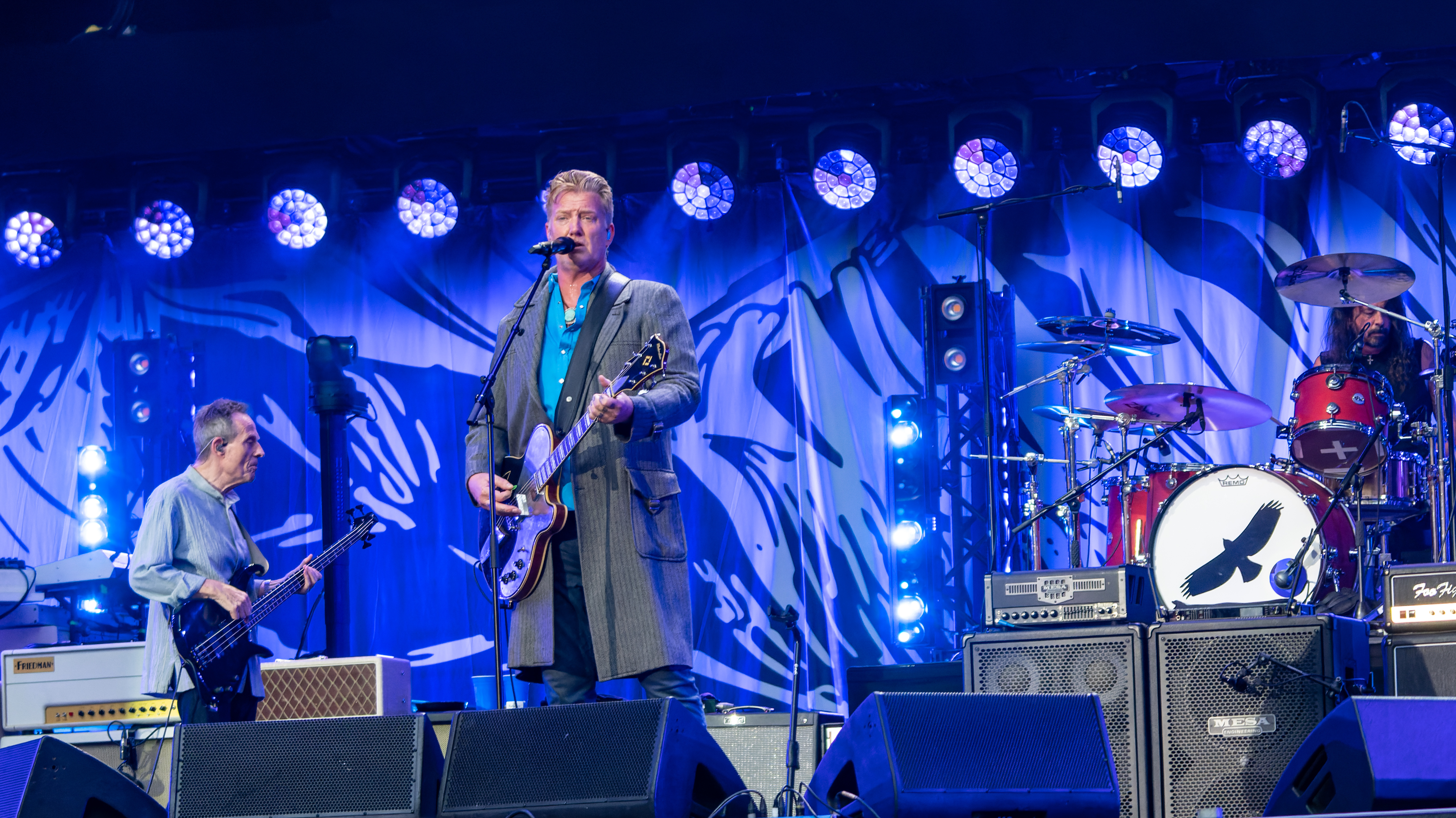
- Them Crooked Vultures performing at the Taylor Hawkins tribute concert in September 2022; from left to right: John Paul Jones, Josh Homme, Dave Grohl

Background information
- Origin: Los Angeles, California, U.S.
- Genres: Hard rock; alternative rock
- Years active: 2009–2010; 2022 (hiatus)
- Labels: Sony; Interscope
- Spinoff of: Queens of the Stone Age; Led Zeppelin; Foo Fighters
- Members: Josh Homme; John Paul Jones; Dave Grohl
- Website: themcrookedvultures.com

Them Crooked Vultures is an American and British rock supergroup formed in Los Angeles in 2009 with American musician Josh Homme on lead vocals and guitar, British musician John Paul Jones on bass and keyboards, and American musician Dave Grohl on drums and backing vocals. Chilean-American guitarist Alain Johannes also joins the group during live performances.

The band began recording in February 2009, and performed its first gig in Chicago on August 9, 2009, followed by a European debut on August 19. On October 1, the group embarked on the worldwide (excluding Africa, South America, and most Asia) Deserve the Future Tour with dates going into 2010. The band's first single "New Fang" was released in October 2009, followed by its self-titled debut album the following month, which debuted at No. 12 on the Billboard 200. The group won the 2011 Grammy Award for Best Hard Rock Performance for "New Fang".

After going on hiatus in 2010, each member of the band has expressed interest in reuniting to record a new album, with conflicting schedules being cited as the primary delay of a full-scale reunion. In September 2022, Them Crooked Vultures reunited for a pair of performances at both London's Wembley Stadium and the Los Angeles Kia Forum, both as part of tribute shows in honour of Foo Fighters' late drummer Taylor Hawkins. In both shows, the group were also joined by Greg Kurstin on keyboards.

In 2025, Jeff Mezydlo of Yardbarker included the band in his list of "the greatest metal acts that formed in the 2000s".

== History ==
=== Beginnings and Them Crooked Vultures (2005–2009) ===
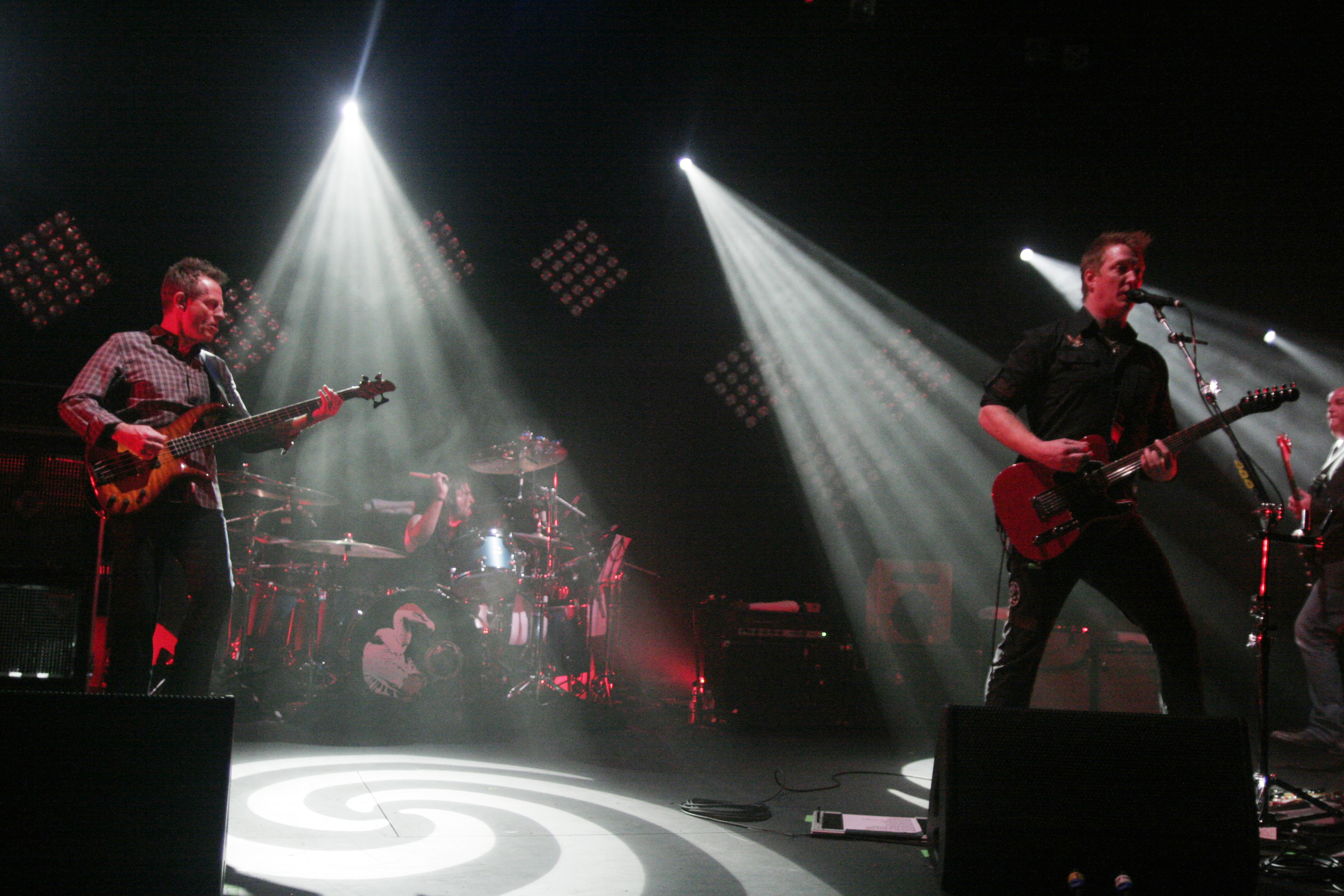
Them Crooked Vultures performing in 2009 at the Paramount in Seattle

A collaboration between Josh Homme, John Paul Jones, and Dave Grohl was first publicly mentioned by Grohl in a 2005 interview with Mojo, in which he declared "The next project that I'm trying to initiate involves me on drums, Josh Homme on guitar, and John Paul Jones playing bass." In a 2019 post on his Facebook page, Jimmy Page suggested that he could have been part of the band as well, based on conversations he had with Grohl. Of the nascent project, Homme's ex-wife Brody Dalle commented in July 2009 that "I'm not at liberty to talk about it [...] but I think [the project] is pretty amazing. Just beats and sounds like you've never heard before." After finding that the name Caligula was already taken, the members arbitrarily chose "Them Crooked Vultures" as a name with no significance.

British music magazine NME reported in July 2009 that the trio had begun recording in Los Angeles. The band performed its first show at the Metro, Chicago on August 9, 2009, at midnight. The band played all original material during its 80-minute set, debuting such songs as opener "Elephants", "Scumbag Blues", "Caligulove" and closing song "No One Loves Me & Neither Do I". The band made its European debut on August 19 with a performance at Melkweg in the Netherlands, the same day on which a short video clip of studio footage was uploaded by the band, featuring the song "No One Loves Me & Neither Do I".

With subsequent festival performances in Europe at Pukkelpop and Lowlands, the band first performed in the United Kingdom at London's Brixton Academy supporting English alternative rock band Arctic Monkeys on August 26. The trio subsequently performed at the Reading and Leeds Festivals on August 28 and 29, playing the Leeds Festival first then moving onto Reading the next day.

Them Crooked Vultures was released by Interscope Records in North America, and Sony Music internationally. On October 21, radio personality Alan Cross announced the lead single for Them Crooked Vultures debut album to be "New Fang" which premiered on October 26. The single was released on November 2 worldwide as a free download. Icon vs. Icon subsequently announced that the album would be released on November 17, 2009. On November 3, the band gave a free copy of "Mind Eraser (No Chaser)" to fans that had bought tickets to a live performance and offered it on iTunes as a free download. On November 9, Them Crooked Vultures started streaming their full album on their website, and also through a link to their mailing list with the title "Fuck Patience, Let's Dance."

On September 1, the band announced two 2009 tours of North America and the United Kingdom, in October and December respectively. The 2009 tour was titled Deserve the Future Tour and the UK leg sold out in just under 12 minutes, making it one of the quickest sold tours in the UK — without the band even officially releasing a song to date. On September 21, the band also announced three Germany dates for December 2009.

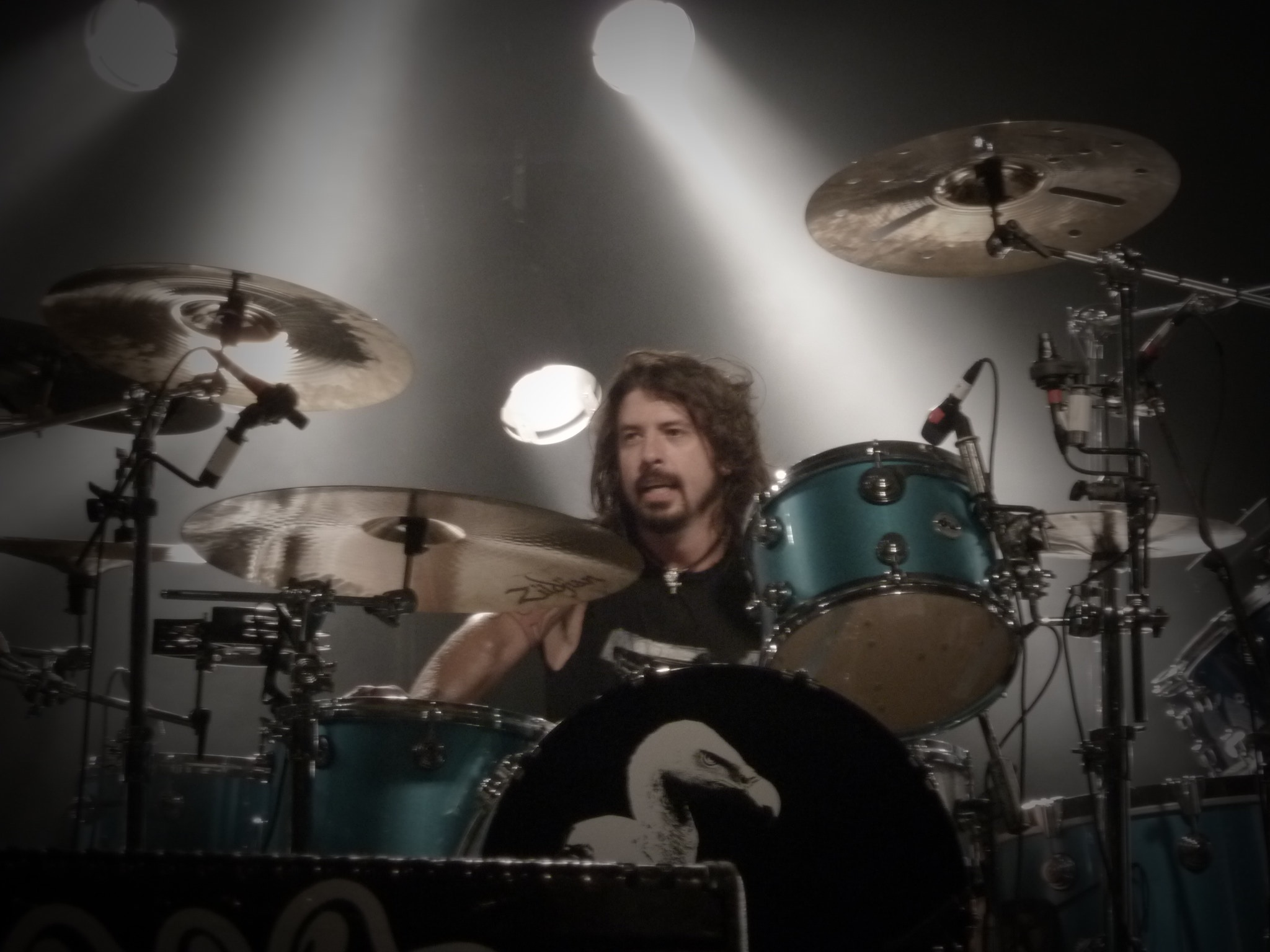
Grohl performing with Them Crooked Vultures in August 2009

On November 17, 2009, the single "New Fang" was released as a downloadable song for Rock Band 2. On October 26, 2010, the song titled "Dead End Friends" was included as an on-disc track for the game Rock Band 3.

On January 25, 2010, it was confirmed that the band would perform at the Download Festival 2010.

On February 6, 2010, the band performed the songs "Mind Eraser, No Chaser" (now the second single) and "New Fang" as musical guests on Saturday Night Live. Dave Grohl also appeared in a sketch near the end of the show. A week later, the band appeared on the PBS show Austin City Limits broadcast February 13, 2010. The band appeared on Jimmy Kimmel Live! on April 13–14, 2010.

The band also confirmed a series of festival appearances for 2010, including the Coachella Music Festival on April 16, Roskilde Festival, the Peace & Love Festival in Borlange, Sweden on July 1, 2010, and Hove Festival in Arendal, Norway on June 30, 2010. The band closed the show on the Alternastage at Rock Am Ring, Nürburg, Germany, playing after midnight on June 7, 2010.

In March, it was announced that the group were to play at The Royal Albert Hall in aid of The Teenage Cancer Trust with support coming from Little Fish.

On April 20, 2010, Them Crooked Vultures released a digital 45 onto iTunes featuring the songs "Mind Eraser, No Chaser" and the song "Hwy 1" on the A side. "Hwy 1" wasn't featured on the band's self-titled album but was usually played live. For those reasons, the version of "Hwy 1" featured was recorded live in Sydney, Australia. The B-side featured "Vulture Speak", an interview with the band members.

=== Hiatus and possible second album (2010–2022) ===
Grohl said in an interview that they are working on a second album that will be "more powerful than the first one". John Paul Jones also stated in an interview while touring in New Zealand that they will be recording a new album. When asked about the futures of Grohl and Homme's bands Jones said that they will get their frontmen back "eventually". A video was uploaded to the band's official YouTube channel entitled 'Fresh Pots' which NME claimed was filmed during recording for their follow-up album. Grohl clarified after the video's release that it was filmed a year prior, during the self-titled album's recording sessions.

On November 12, 2010, in an interview with BBC 6 Music, John Paul Jones has confirmed that the band is ready to resume working on putting together new material for a fresh release, and will go into the studio very soon. Jones has also stated that they are tentatively a year or so away from completing the CD, hinting on a possible late 2011 release.

In November 2011, touring member Alain Johannes noted that there are definitely plans to record a second studio album, stating: "The way that the cycles happen, you know, Dave jumped right into Foos, and then Josh toured more than a solid year with Queens for the self-titled album. So I expect at some point after the Queens cycle that there will be [another album]."

In December 2012, when asked about the band's future, Dave Grohl stated: "We've talked about it, I know that someday we'll get back together and do stuff, because we love playing with each other." Grohl once again mentioned a possible reunion in an interview with Zane Lowe on Apple Music's Beats 1 radio station in June 2017.

In an interview with The Guardian in August 2019, Grohl stated: "It's still hard to accept that I got to play in a band with [John Paul Jones]. Technically we're still a band. [...] We practice once every decade, and we're coming up on another decade aren't we? I don't have any official news but there's always something cooking." In a further interview with NME, Grohl elaborated: "We've talked. We've got together. I never say never. If you want me to be your drummer, we either have to be best fucking friends or you have to be better than Josh Homme and John Paul Jones. If those guys call and say that it's time to go, then I'm gonna go because that's the band. That's the band that I want to be the drummer of forever. Josh and I talk about it all the time. I know that John would love to as well. It's also like herding cats. So, we'll see."

=== Reunion for tribute shows (2022) ===
In September 2022, the band reunited for two tribute shows dedicated to the late Foo Fighters drummer Taylor Hawkins. At Wembley Stadium, the group performed "Gunman" as well as covers of Elton John's "Goodbye Yellow Brick Road" and Queens of the Stone Age's "Long Slow Goodbye". At the KIA Forum show, they reprised the same set, with "Dead End Friends" played instead of "Gunman". During both performances, the group was joined by Greg Kurstin on keyboards and Alain Johannes on guitar.

== Musical style ==
Them Crooked Vultures has been described as hard rock and alternative rock. According to Louder Sound, "Them Crooked Vultures is loaded with ample elements of sludge metal, noise rock, grunge, stoner rock, and a generous dash of classic psychedelic rock sensibilities."

== Band members ==
Official members

- Josh Homme – lead vocals, guitars, slide guitar
- John Paul Jones – bass, keyboards, clavinet, piano, keytar, lap steel guitar, slide bass guitar, mandolin, violin, backing vocals
- Dave Grohl – drums, percussion, backing vocals

Touring members

- Alain Johannes – guitars, slide guitar, bass, keyboards, backing vocals

== Discography ==
=== Studio albums ===
List of studio albums, with selected details, chart positions and certifications
Title	Album details	Peak chart positions										Certifications
Title	Album details	US	AUS	BEL	CAN	FRA	GER	IRE	NZ	NOR	UK	Certifications
Them Crooked Vultures	Released: November 17, 2009; Label: DGC/Interscope; Format: CD, LP	12	4	5	5	38	13	16	2	5	13	ARIA: Gold; BPI: Gold; MC: Platinum; RMNZ: Gold

=== Singles ===
Title	Year	Peak chart positions										Album
Title	Year	US Bub.	US Alt.	US Rock	AUS	BEL (FL)	CAN	CAN Rock	MEX	UK	UK Rock	Album
"New Fang"	2009	24	10	14	70	69	39	1	15	156	10	Them Crooked Vultures
"Mind Eraser, No Chaser"	2009	— (Note: "Mind Eraser, No Chaser" did not enter the US Bubbling Under singles chart, but peaked at number 4 on the US Hot Singles Sales chart.)	39	—	—	—	—	33	—	— (Note: "Mind Eraser, No Chaser" did not enter the UK Singles Chart, but peaked at number 25 on the UK Physical Singles Chart.)	23	Them Crooked Vultures
"—" denotes a recording that did not chart or was not released in that territory.

== Awards and nominations ==
Grammy Awards

The Grammy Awards are awarded annually by the National Academy of Recording Arts and Sciences.

Year	Nominee / work	Award	Result
2011	"New Fang"	Best Hard Rock Performance	Won
