= New Fang =

Single by Them Crooked Vultures

from the album Them Crooked Vultures
- Released: October 26, 2009
- Recorded: January–August 2009
- Studio: Pink Duck Studios, Los Angeles, California
- Genre: Rock
- Length: 3:49
- Label: Sony BMG, DGC/Interscope, Columbia
- Songwriters: Josh Homme, John Paul Jones, Dave Grohl
- Producer: Them Crooked Vultures

Them Crooked Vultures singles chronology
"New Fang" (2009)	"Mind Eraser, No Chaser" (2009)

"New Fang" is the debut single by Los Angeles–based rock supergroup Them Crooked Vultures. It was the first track the band worked on. "New Fang" was released as the first single from the band's self-titled debut album (2009). The single was released to radio on October 26, 2009. It entered the top ten of the Alternative Songs chart, peaking at number 10, and the top twenty on both the Hot Mainstream Rock Tracks (number 13) and Rock Songs (number 14) charts. The song, as performed by the band during a New York concert on October 15, 2009, was described by New York Times writer Nate Chinen as one of the band's "more buoyant tunes, hint[ing] at Southern boogie rock."

The song also won a Grammy Award for Best Hard Rock Performance at the 53rd Grammy Awards on February 13, 2011. It was the last song to win the award before its discontinuation.

== Appearances in other media ==
The song was made available as downloadable content for Rock Band for the Xbox 360 on November 17, 2009, for Nintendo Wii on November 24, 2009, and for PlayStation 3 on December 3, 2009.

== Chart performance ==
=== Weekly charts ===
Weekly chart performance for "New Fang"
Chart (2009–2010)	Peak position
Australia (ARIA)	70
Canada Hot 100 (Billboard)	39
Canada Rock (Billboard)	1
UK Singles Chart (Official Charts Company)	156
UK Rock & Metal (Official Charts)	10
US Hot Rock & Alternative Songs (Billboard)	14

=== Year-end charts ===
Year-end chart performance for "New Fang"
Chart (2010)	Position
US Hot Rock Songs (Billboard)	44
