= Confetti (Little Birdy album) =

Studio album by Little Birdy
- Released: 8 May 2009
- Recorded: 2008–2009
- Genre: Rock, Alternative
- Label: Eleven/Universal
- Producer: Little Birdy, Steven Schram

Little Birdy chronology
Hollywood (2006)	Confetti (2009)

Singles from Confetti
- 1. "Brother" Released: April 2009; 2. "Summarize" Released: 17 April 2009; 3. "Hairdo" Released: 28 July 2009; 4. "Stay Wild" Released: October 2009

Professional ratings
Review scores
Source	Rating
AllMusic	2.5/5 stars
BMA Magazine	(favorable)
The Dwarf	(favorable)
FasterLouder	(unfavorable)
Rave Magazine	4/5 stars
The Vine	(unfavorable)

Confetti is the third studio album by Australian indie rock band Little Birdy, released on 8 May 2009. It debuted at number 6 on the ARIA album charts.

== Background ==
In an interview, Steele describes the inspiration behind the title: "Confetti fell out of my mouth, the word just literally came out of nowhere".

"Brother" is inspired by a lifetime with her brother, Luke and father, Rick. It opens with the couplet "my brother you taught me how to fly, my papa you taught me how to cry".

This song was straight up. Sometimes I wondered if we should even put it on the record because it's just so honest and brutal – brutal in the fragile sense.

— Katy Steele

== Production ==
Australian musician Paul Kelly adds vocals and harmonica to the track, returning the favour for the backing vocals Katy provided on some sessions for him a few years back.

The experience of working with Paul just reminded me of why he's such a legend. It wasn’t like he just rocked up to the studio to do a session – he really poured everything into it. We kinda felt like he joined our band for that day and that was a pretty great feeling.

— Katy Steele

== Singles ==
"Summarize" was the second single released from Confetti on 10 April 2009. The single made it to number 54 on the ARIA charts.

"Hairdo" was the third single, released on 28 July 2009. Katy Steele of "HotSource.com.au" described its message as to be "yourself in life [..], in a place where you are comfortable and happy in your own skin". The video for "Hairdo" was filmed in a warehouse at Melbourne's Docklands and was directed by D'Arcy Foley-Dawson.

"Stay Wild" the fourth single from the album, released digitally in October 2009. Initially the song "Confetti" was planned to be a single, but it was switched with "Stay Wild" instead. A music video was produced to promote the single, featuring Katy Steele out there in the country surrounded by the green, surveying her surrounds, perusing Boinga Bob’s iconic Warburton, Victoria home. Joined by the rest of the band (each carrying a different coloured flag), she sets out into the great wild outdoors to breathe in the crisp fresh air.

This is a full-on driving song. It's a song about being free, embracing life, moving. We got the gospel choir in for it and the bass and drums sound very '70s, which is totally cool. It's a glorious kind of song.

— Katy Steele

== Track listing ==
All tracks are written by Katy Steele, except "Porcelain" written by Simon Leach.

Confetti
No.	Title	Length
1.	"Brother"	3:37
2.	"Summarize"	3:19
3.	"Hairdo"	4:10
4.	"Stay Wild"	4:09
5.	"Into My Arms"	3:58
6.	"Dark of Night"	3:27
7.	"It Ain't True"	1:07
8.	"Run Run Run"	4:17
9.	"Crazy"	3:07
10.	"Everyone is Sleeping"	4:07
11.	"Confetti" (includes hidden track "Porcelain")	12:24
12.	"Baby Love" (iTunes bonus track – Deluxe Version)	2:58
13.	"New York" (iTunes bonus track – Standard/Deluxe Versions)	4:59

Confetti – Limited Edition DVD
No.	Title	Length
1.	"DVD: The Making of Confetti, A Documentary"
2.	"Track By Track, An Insight From The Band"
3.	""Summarize" – Behind The Scenes"
4.	""Summarize" – Video"
5.	""Brother" – Video"

== Charts ==
Year	Chart	Peak position
2009	ARIA Albums Charts	#6

=== End of year charts ===
Year	Chart	Rank
2009	Australian ARIA End of year Chart	#93

=== Certifications ===
Country	Certification	Sales
Australia	Gold	35,000+

== Release history ==
Region	Date	Label	Format	Catalogue
Australia	8 May 2009	Eleven/Universal	CD, Digital download	ELEVENCD86
Australia	8 May 2009	Eleven/Universal	CD/DVD	ELEVENCDSP86

== Personnel ==
=== Musicians ===
==== Little Birdy ====
- Katy Steele – vocals, guitar, keyboard
- Simon Leach – guitar, synthesiser, steel guitar
- Scott 'Barney' O'Donoghue – bass guitar, vocals, melodica, harmonica
- Matt Chequer – drums, percussion

==== Additional musicians ====
- Paul Coyle – trumpet (track 2)
- Shannon Barnett – trombone (track 2)
- Tom Spender – tenor saxophone (track 2)
- Peter Mitchell – baritone saxophone (track 2)
- Jessica Bell – violin (track 4, 5 and 10)
- Willow Stahlut – violin (track 4, 5 and 10)
- Ewen Bramble – cello (track 4, 5 and 10)
- Christian Read – viola (track 4, 5 and 10)
- Garret Costigan – pedal steel guitar (track 4)
- Miles Brown – theremin (tracks 3 and 10)
- Craig Shanahan – percussion (track 10)
- Charlie Thorpe – vocals (track 6)
- Josie De Sousa-Ray – vocals (track 6)
- Paul Kelly – vocals, harmonica (track 1)
- Fergus Deasy – guitar (track 1)

=== Credits ===
- Production – Little Birdy, Matt Chequer, Steve Schram
- Recording and Mixing – Steve Schram
- Recording Assistant – Alex Beck
- Mixing Assistants – Lachlan Wooden, Mick Rafferty, Davin Pidoto, Jim White
- Mastered – Bob Ludwig
- Artwork – Simon Leach
- Photography – Tony Mott, Louise Griew
- Cover – Simon Ozolins
