= Mind Eraser, No Chaser =

Single by Them Crooked Vultures

from the album Them Crooked Vultures
- B-side: "HWY 1" (Live From Sydney)/"Vulture Speak"
- Released: November 3, 2009
- Recorded: January–August 2009 in Pink Duck Studios, Los Angeles, California
- Genre: Alternative rock, hard rock
- Length: 4:07
- Label: Sony BMG, DGC/Interscope, Columbia
- Songwriters: Josh Homme, John Paul Jones, Dave Grohl
- Producer: Them Crooked Vultures

Them Crooked Vultures singles chronology
"New Fang" (2009)	"Mind Eraser, No Chaser" (2009)

"Mind Eraser, No Chaser" is the second single released by rock supergroup Them Crooked Vultures. "Mind Eraser, No Chaser" was released on November 3, 2009 as the second single from the band's self-titled debut album (2009). It was released as iTunes's Single Of The Week as part of promotion for their debut album. The song features vocals from both guitarist Josh Homme and drummer Dave Grohl.

On April 20, 2010, Them Crooked Vultures released a picture disc featuring the songs "Mind Eraser, No Chaser" and a live version of the song "HWY 1" recorded in Sydney, plus an interview on the B-side. The release was in aid of Record Store Day. The single was also released on iTunes.

== Charts ==
Chart (2009–2010)	Peak position
Canada Rock (Billboard)	33
US Alternative Airplay (Billboard)	39
US Hot Singles Sales (Billboard)	4
