= BigBigLove =

Studio album by Little Birdy
- Released: 4 October 2004
- Genres: Alternative rock Indie rock
- Length: 45:15
- Label: Virgin / EMI

Little Birdy chronology
This Is a Love Song EP (2004)	BigBigLove (2004)	Hollywood (2006)

Singles from BigBigLove
- 1. "Beautiful to Me" Released: 14 September 2004; 2. "Tonight's the Night" Released: 29 November 2004; 3. "Excited" Released: 18 April 2005

Professional ratings
Review scores
Source	Rating
FasterLouder	(favorable)

BigBigLove is the debut studio album by Australian indie rock band Little Birdy, released in Australia on 4 October 2004. It reached number 5 in the ARIA music charts and was certified gold less than a month after its release. The album was produced by Paul McKercher at Big Jesus Burger Studios and mixed at Studios 301.

Three singles were released from the album; "Beautiful to Me", which reached number 27, "Tonight's the Night", and "Excited", which reached number 44 on the ARIA Singles Charts.

The album was nominated for four ARIA Awards in 2004; Best Breakthrough Artist/Album, Best Rock Album, Best Producer, and Best Engineer. Two tracks from the album reached the Triple J Hottest 100 for 2004; "Beautiful to Me" at number 8 and "Tonight's the Night" at number 78.

The album features a more pop-oriented, commercial alternative rock sound than their later records, which experimented with electronic music and folk.

== Background ==
The main thing that I wanted to do with this record was to have as much classic, memorable melody as possible. The songs are all based on feelings and emotion, for each song had a particular vision. It covers all the colours we wanted to show with a first record. BigBigLove is built from that big hole I had inside. It’s amazing how close this band has become and how fast we understand each other now. We have grown a million years in one year.

— Katy Steele, November 2004

McKercher was selected to produce after Steele was impressed with his work on Augie March's debut album, Sunset Studies.

We wanted a pretty classic-sounding album; we didn't want to do anything that sounded really now.

— Katy Steele, October 2004

== Track listing ==
No.	Title	Length
1.	"Excited"	3:37
2.	"Come on Little Heartbreaker"	3:48
3.	"Beautiful to Me"	3:29
4.	"It's All My Fault"	3:02
5.	"Tonight's the Night"	3:44
6.	"Message to God"	3:37
7.	"Losing You"	5:00
8.	"Relapse"	3:36
9.	"Forever"	3:24
10.	"Close to You"	4:44
11.	"It's a Rule for You All"	1:32
12.	"Andy Warhol"	5:38
13.	"Baby Blue" (Japanese Limited Edition bonus track)	3:59

Bonus Live at the Enmore Theatre CD
No.	Title	Length
1.	"Lullaby"	2:09
2.	"Baby Blue"	3:46
3.	"This Is a Love Song"	2:40
4.	"Relapse"	3:47
5.	"Excited"	3:32

== Charts ==
Year	Chart	Peak position
2004	Australian ARIA Album Charts	5

=== Certifications ===
Country	Certification	Sales
Australia	Gold	35,000+
