= Beautiful to Me (Little Birdy song) =

2004 single by Little Birdy

Single by Little Birdy

from the album BigBigLove
- B-side: "It's All My Fault" (demo); "Raised in the Day of the Rich and the Weary"
- Released: 13 September 2004
- Length: 3:24
- Label: Eleven: A Music Company; Virgin
- Songwriters: Matt Chequer; Simon Leach; Scott O'Donoghue; Katy Steele
- Producer: Paul McKercher

Little Birdy singles chronology
"Beautiful to Me" (2004)	"Tonight's the Night" (2004)

"Beautiful to Me" is a song by Australian indie rock band Little Birdy, released as the lead single from their debut album, BigBigLove. It was issued as their debut single on 13 September 2004 and reached number 27 on the Australian ARIA Singles Charts. The song reached number two on the Triple J Net 50 and was ranked number eight on Triple J's Hottest 100 of 2004.

== Track listing ==
No.	Title	Length
1.	"Beautiful to Me"	3:24
2.	"It's All My Fault" (demo)	3:29
3.	"Raised in the Day of the Rich and the Weary"	4:20

== Charts ==
Chart (2004)	Peak position
Australia (ARIA)	27
