= Katy Steele =

Australian singer, guitarist and songwriter

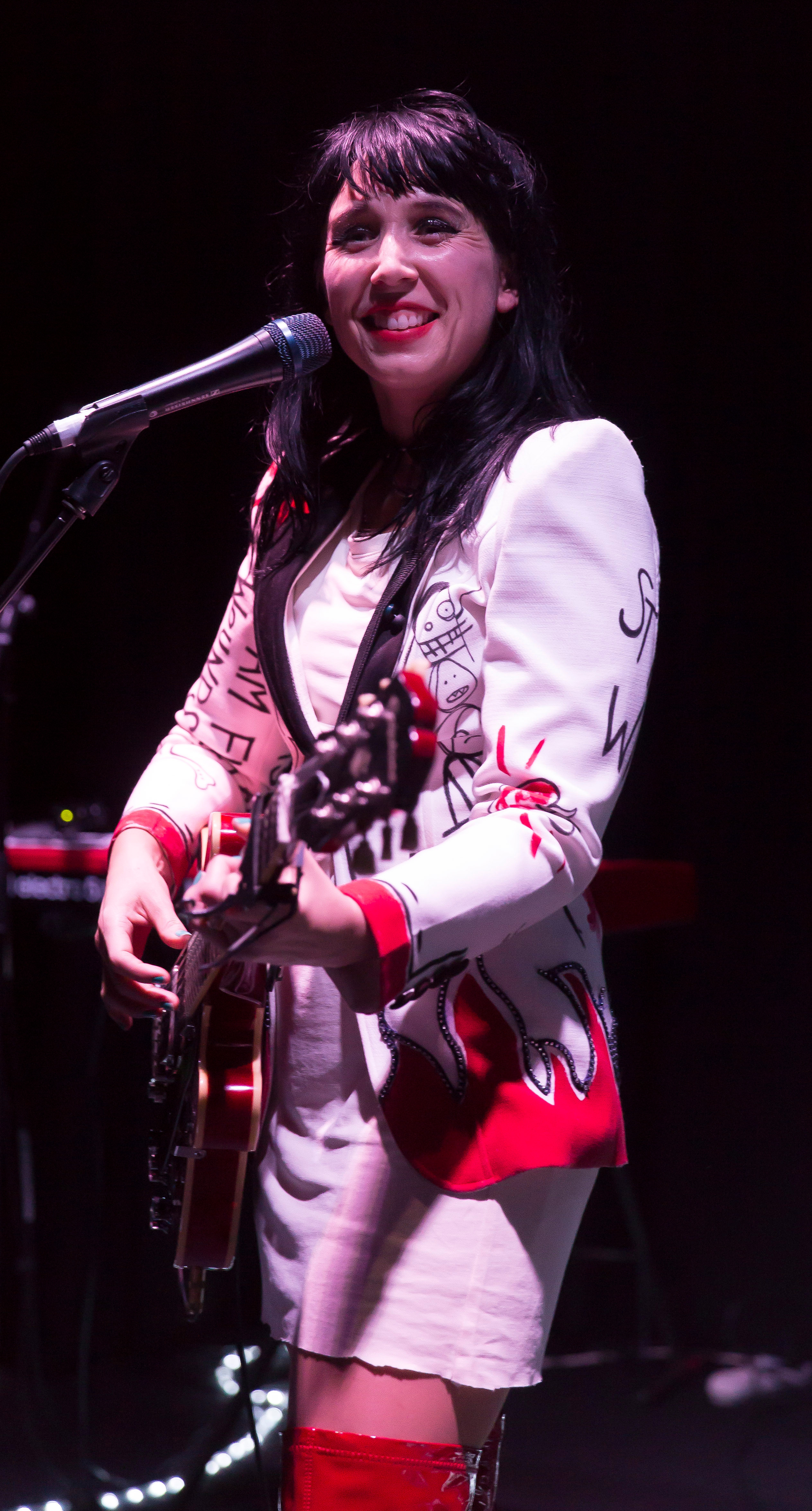
- Steele in 2017

Background information
- Born: Kate Elizabeth Steele; 9 September 1983 (age 43); Perth, Western Australia, Australia
- Genres: Rock, pop
- Occupations: Musician, guitarist, singer, songwriter, keyboard
- Instruments: Vocals, guitar
- Years active: 2001–present
- Member of: Little Birdy

Kate Elizabeth Steele (born 9 September 1983) is an Australian singer, guitarist and songwriter of the four-piece rock band Little Birdy.

== Early life ==
Steele was born Kate Elizabeth Steele on 9 September 1983, in Perth, Western Australia, and has a fraternal twin brother, Jake. She and her brother are the youngest in the family. Her father, Rick Steele, was a New Zealand–born accomplished blues musician, together with Katy's oldest brother Jesse on drums, in his band, Rick Steele & The Hot Biscuit Band. Her older brother, Luke, is the vocalist, guitarist and songwriter of alternative rock band The Sleepy Jackson and also a member of the electronic music duo Empire of the Sun. Jake performs on keyboards with his own band, Injured Ninja.

Steele grew up in the southern suburb of Jandakot and went to Mount Lawley Senior High School. She first started playing in a Perth electro-pop band, The Plastik Scene, in 2001.

== Career ==
=== Little Birdy (2002–2009, 2024–present) ===
In 2002, Steele left the band and joined Simon Leach to form Little Birdy. Steele won the inaugural Jessica Michalik Contemporary Music Award, presented by The Big Day Out on 8 March 2004. In 2004, she was also awarded the Contemporary Music Prize by the Australasian Performing Right Association (APRA). At the 2005 West Australian Music Industry Awards Steele won the WAMi for 'Best Female Vocalist'. She also recorded a version of the classic, "Six Months In a Leaky Boat", on the compilation album, She Will Have Her Way, a collection of Neil and Tim Finn songs performed by female Australian and New Zealand musicians. The song reached number 96 on Triple J's Hottest 100 for 2005

In 2007, Steele won best female performer in the Australian live music awards. Katy has attracted comparisons to Kate Bush and PJ Harvey .

Also in 2007, Steele was invited by Paul Kelly to open for him on his 2007 'Stolen Apples' tour. Faced with a long run of solo shows, Steele set about writing new material.

In Perth I had a room which was really cool. It was a music room dedicated to writing. When I was asked to support Paul Kelly, I wrote "Confetti", "Into My Arms", "Stay Wild" and maybe six or seven other songs. I was so nervous about the Paul Kelly tour because they were theatre shows and I’d never played on my own before. So I wrote a whole bunch of songs that would hopefully sound good with just what I had — vocals and guitar.

— Katy Steele

The material was then adapted and forms the basis of Little Birdy's new album, Confetti.

In 2008, Steele relocated to Brunswick, with the other band members also moving to Melbourne. In early 2010 Steele announced on Triple J radio that she would be moving to New York and the band announced that they would be taking some time out to pursue other individual ventures.

In 2024, Steele, along with Leach and O'Donoghue, reformed Little Birdy for the first time since 2009 to perform a series of shows around Australia for the Hotter Than Hell festival. In March 2025, to commemorate the 21st anniversary of BigBigLove, they would announce a reunion tour titled "BigBigLove 21st Birthday Tour", which took place around Australia between June and August the same year.

=== Solo career (2010–present) ===
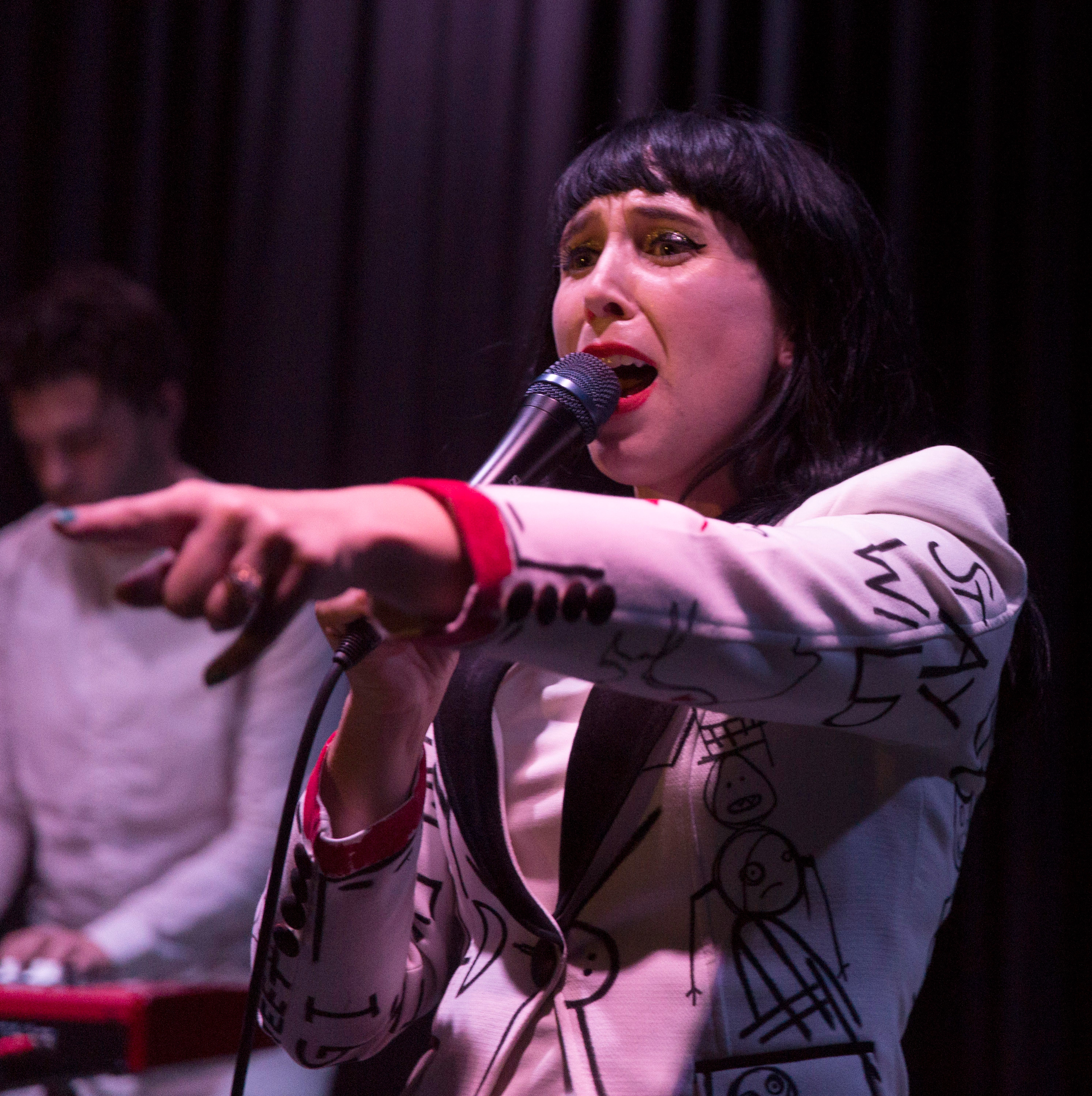
Steele in 2017

Steele moved to New York City in March 2010 for a change of scenery, and to start work on her new solo project.

"I’ve always loved the idea of NYC. The largeness, the intensity, the struggle. A lot of my idols have either come from New York or moved there at some point, so it’s something I’ve always wanted to do. There has never really been a chance in my life before now to have a break, or to pursue other directions."

In May 2010, Steele returned home for a whirlwind sold-out tour to the major capital cities. She showcased her new material, along with some old classics, and stirred the audience with insights into her new life, and love, in New York.

In July 2010, Steele was back in Australia supporting Richard Ashcroft (The Verve) on the Australian leg of his tour, and upon her return to New York, she announced her appointment as the Music Ambassador for the Williamsburg International Film Festival (Willifest 2010), for which a video for her song "Sorrow" was recorded.

Steele collaborated with her brother, Luke on "Good Things" as part of a Maurice Frawley tribute album.

In late November 2011, Steele featured in a new release singing harmonies with Josh Pyke on the song, "Punch in the Heart". The video for the song sees both singers in a split-screen view performing twin one-take recordings singing to the camera.

On 13 March 2013, Steele's first single, "Fire Me Up" premiered on the Triple J radio program Home & Hosed. "Fire Me Up" was also available through Bandcamp, where the track could be downloaded for free.

Steele released her debut studio album, Human, on 21 October 2016. The album reached No. 23 on the Australian album charts and Steele undertook a thirteen-date national tour in February to March 2017 in support of the album's release.

On 29 September 2022, Steele released her first single since 2013, titled "Feel So Bad".

On 31 March 2023, Steele released "Come and See Me" from her forthcoming album, Big Star.

== Personal life ==
In December 2017 Steele married Scottish musician, Graham McLuskie, and in April 2018 she had a daughter, Iona.

== Discography ==
=== Studio albums ===
Title	Details	Peak chart positions
Title	Details	AUS
Human	Released: 21 October 2016; Label: Create/Control (CC0001296); Format: CD, digital download	23
Big Star	Released: 9 June 2023; Label: Love and a Shotgun; Format: CD, digital download	—

== Awards and nominations ==
=== West Australian Music Industry Awards ===
The West Australian Music Industry Awards (WAMIs) are annual awards presented to the local contemporary music industry, put on annually by the Western Australian Music Industry Association Inc (WAM). Katy Steele won three awards.

Year	Nominee / work	Award	Result (wins only)
2003	Katy Steele	Most Popular Local Original Female Vocalist	Won
2005	Katy Steele	Best Female Vocalist	Won
2006	Katy Steele	Best Female Vocalist	Won
