= Little Birdy =

Australian alternative rock band

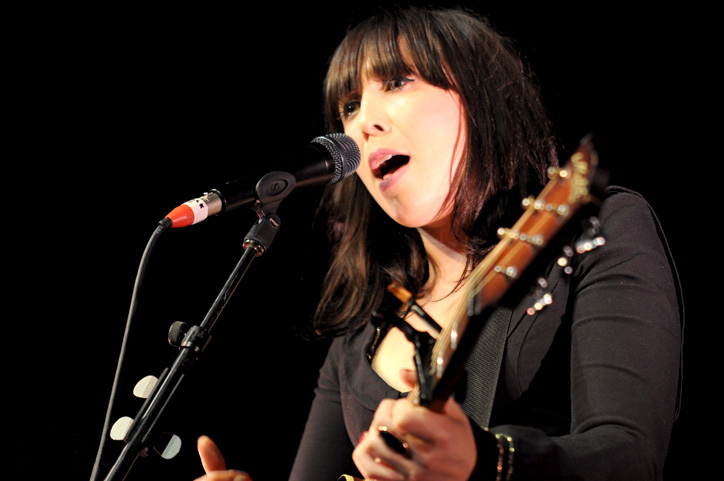
- Little Birdy at the Capitol, 2009

Background information
- Origin: Perth, Western Australia
- Genres: Indie rock, alternative rock
- Years active: 2002–2010, 2024–present
- Labels: Eleven, Virgin, EMI, Universal
- Members: Simon Leach; Scott ('Barney') O'Donoghue; Katy Steele
- Past members: Matt Chequer; Fergus Deasy
- Website: www.little-birdy.com

Little Birdy is an Australian alternative rock band formed in Perth, Western Australia, in 2002 by singer and guitarist Katy Steele, drummer Matt Chequer, guitarist and keyboardist Simon Leach, and bass guitarist Scott O'Donoghue. They gained public attention when their single "Relapse" gained popularity on alternative radio stations such as Triple J, leading them to be signed by the record label Eleven: A Music Company. They released three studio albums (all three of which entered the top ten in the ARIA charts), two EPs, and ten singles in their original run.

== Early history ==
Katy Steele's father Rick Steele was a local blues musician in various cover bands, and her brothers Jesse and Luke were both members of The Sleepy Jackson. Jesse left the band in 2000. Steele was the singer-songwriter and guitarist in her band, The Plastik Scene. A friend of Luke's, Simon Leach, heard Steele singing at her brother's 21st birthday party. "Katy was always there... She was around 15 when I saw her sing. Three years later, Katy and I were playing together." Steele left her band and, with Leach as drummer, they performed several gigs as a duo. Scott ('Barney') O'Donoghue later offered to play bass guitar. Leach became tired of percussion and began playing guitar when Matt Chequer joined on drums. In 2002 Little Birdy was formed, named after the Ween song of the same name.

A demo, leaked to radio, was played on alternative stations. A friend of the band dropped a copy at band manager Phil Stevens' home (manager of The Waifs, John Butler Trio and The Flairz). Stevens offered his management services. The band supported Placebo, Morcheeba, and The Superjesus in Perth concerts. A home recording of one of their songs won a WAMi Award for "Indie-Alternative Song of the Year". Triple J, a national radio station, started playing an early version of "Relapse", while local Perth radio station Nova 93.7 aired a demo of "Baby Blue". As a result of independent media coverage and radio playing demos, Australian labels sought to sign the band. Little Birdy opted for the independent Eleven label with distribution through Virgin Records-EMI. Steele, along with Leach, who was a graphic designer, quit their jobs and became full-time musicians after the signing.

== Recording career ==
Little Birdy released their self-titled debut EP Little Birdy in October 2003, which peaked at No. 27 on the ARIA Singles Chart. "Relapse" reached No. 16 on the Triple J Hottest 100 and "Baby Blue" attained No. 25. In September, Steele, in an interview on Whammo.com.au, described the band's progress: "I think we've already written a lot of the first album already. A lot of songs we play live would be awesome if they were recorded". The band played gigs in London and New York City later that year, with interest from international record companies.

Their second EP, This Is a Love Song, was issued in March 2004 and debuted at No. 22. Also in that month, Steele won the inaugural Jessica Michalik Contemporary Music Award, presented by The Big Day Out. At the ARIA Music Awards of 2004, "Relapse" was nominated for 'Breakthrough Artist - Single'.

In October, the band released their debut album, BigBigLove, which was produced and engineered by Paul McKercher (The Cruel Sea, Spiderbait, Augie March) and peaked at No. 5 on the ARIA Albums Chart. It contains new versions of "Beautiful" (renamed "Beautiful to Me") and "Relapse", and includes "I Should've Known" with its original title of "Andy Warhol". The album received generally positive critical reviews. Two tracks reached the Triple J Hottest 100 of 2004, "Beautiful to Me" at No. 8 and "Tonight's the Night" at No. 78. Another track, "This Is a Love Song", taken from their This Is a Love Song, attained No. 40.

In 2005, at the WAMi Awards, Steele won 'Best Female Vocalist' and "Beautiful to Me" won 'Most Popular Music Video'. Additional nominations were, Leach for 'Best Guitarist', the band for 'Best Popular Act', 'Most Popular Commercial Pop Act' and 'Best Indie/Pop Act', and BigBigLove as 'Most Popular Album'. At the ARIA Music Awards of 2005, BigBigLove was nominated in four categories: 'Breakthrough Artist - Album', 'Best Rock Album', 'Producer of the Year" (McKercher), and 'Engineer of the Year' (McKercher). Also that year, Little Birdy's version of "Six Months in a Leaky Boat" from the tribute album, She Will Have Her Way, of Neil and Tim Finn songs performed by female Australian and New Zealand musicians, reached No. 96 on Triple J's Hottest 100 of 2005.

During 2006, the band recorded tracks for their second album, Hollywood, which peaked at No. 9 in October. The first single was "Come on Come on", in September, which reached No. 18 – the group's highest-charting single to date. It was placed 11th on the Triple J Hottest 100, 2006.

In 2008, the band relocated to Melbourne and started recording a third album, Confetti, which they released in May 2009 and peaked at No. 6. A website was created for previews of new recordings and videos of studio sessions. The album was self-produced and the band worked with engineer-mixer Steven Schram. It was nominated for 'Best Adult Contemporary Album' and 'Engineer of the Year' (Schram) at the ARIA Music Awards of 2009. In February, they issued a music video for the first song, "Brother". The song features Paul Kelly on backing vocals and harmonica.

Confetti's first official single, "Summarize", was released in April, it was followed by "Hairdo" and "Stay Wild". In February 2010, Chequer announced on the band's website that Steele moved to New York and expected to work on her debut solo album, Leach was working on solo material, O'Donoghue was working with other bands, and Chequer himself was doing production work. Steele trialled some solo material at four Australian concerts in May.

== Touring ==
Little Birdy undertook its own concerts throughout Australia in 2004 and 2005. They supported R.E.M. during the Australian leg of their world tour in 2005. Little Birdy appeared at national festivals in 2007, including Falls Festival, Big Day Out, Sonic Bloom Festival, Southbound (in Busselton, Western Australia), and Great Escape Festival (Sydney).

Little Birdy appeared at Sound Relief at the Sydney Cricket Ground in March 2009, which was a benefit concert for victims of Victorian bush fires and Queensland floods.

In 2024, Little Birdy reunited for the first time since 2009 to perform a series of shows around Australia for the Hotter Than Hell festival. In March 2025, to commemorate the 21st anniversary of BigBigLove, they would announce a reunion tour titled "BigBigLove 21st Birthday Tour", which took place around Australia between June and August the same year.

== Members ==
Current members

- Katy Steele – lead vocals, rhythm guitar (2002–2010, 2024–present)
- Simon Leach – lead guitar, synthesizer, pedal steel (2002–2010, 2024–present)
- Scott 'Barney' O'Donoghue – bass guitar, backing vocals, melodica, harmonica (2002–2010, 2024–present)

Current touring musicians

- Sam Maher – drums, percussion (2024–present)

Former members

- Matt Chequer – drums, percussion (2002–2010)

Former touring musicians

- Fergus Deasy – keyboards, backing vocals, synthesizer, rhythm guitar (2006–2010)

== Discography ==
Studio albums

- BigBigLove (2004)
- Hollywood (2006)
- Confetti (2009)

== Awards and nominations ==
=== ARIA Music Awards ===
The ARIA Music Awards is an annual awards ceremony that recognises excellence, innovation, and achievement across all genres of Australian music. They commenced in 1987.

Year	Nominee / work	Award	Result	Ref.
2004	"Relapse"	Breakthrough Artist - Single	Nominated	
2005	BigBigLove	Breakthrough Artist - Album	Nominated	
2005	BigBigLove	Best Rock Album	Nominated	
2005	Paul McKercher for Little Birdy's BigBigLove	Engineer of the Year	Nominated	
2005	Paul McKercher for Little Birdy's BigBigLove	Producer of the Year	Nominated	

=== WAM Song of the Year ===
The WAM Song of the Year was formed by the Western Australian Rock Music Industry Association Inc. (WARMIA) in 1985, with its main aim to develop and run annual awards recognising achievements within the music industry in Western Australia.

Year	Nominee / work	Award	Result
2003	"Andy Warhol"	Indi Pop/Rock	Won

=== West Australian Music Industry Awards ===
The West Australian Music Industry Awards (WAMIs) are annual awards presented to the local contemporary music industry, put on annually by the Western Australian Music Industry Association Inc (WAM). Little Birdy won five awards.

Year	Nominee / work	Award	Result (wins only)
2003	Little Birdy	Most Popular Local Original New Act	Won
2003	Katy Steele (Little Birdy)	Most Popular Local Original Female Vocalist	Won
2005	"Beautiful to Me"	Most Popular Music Video	Won
2005	Katy Steele (Little Birdy)	Best Female Vocalist	Won
2006	Katy Steele (Little Birdy)	Best Female Vocalist	Won
