= Albert Einstein in popular culture =

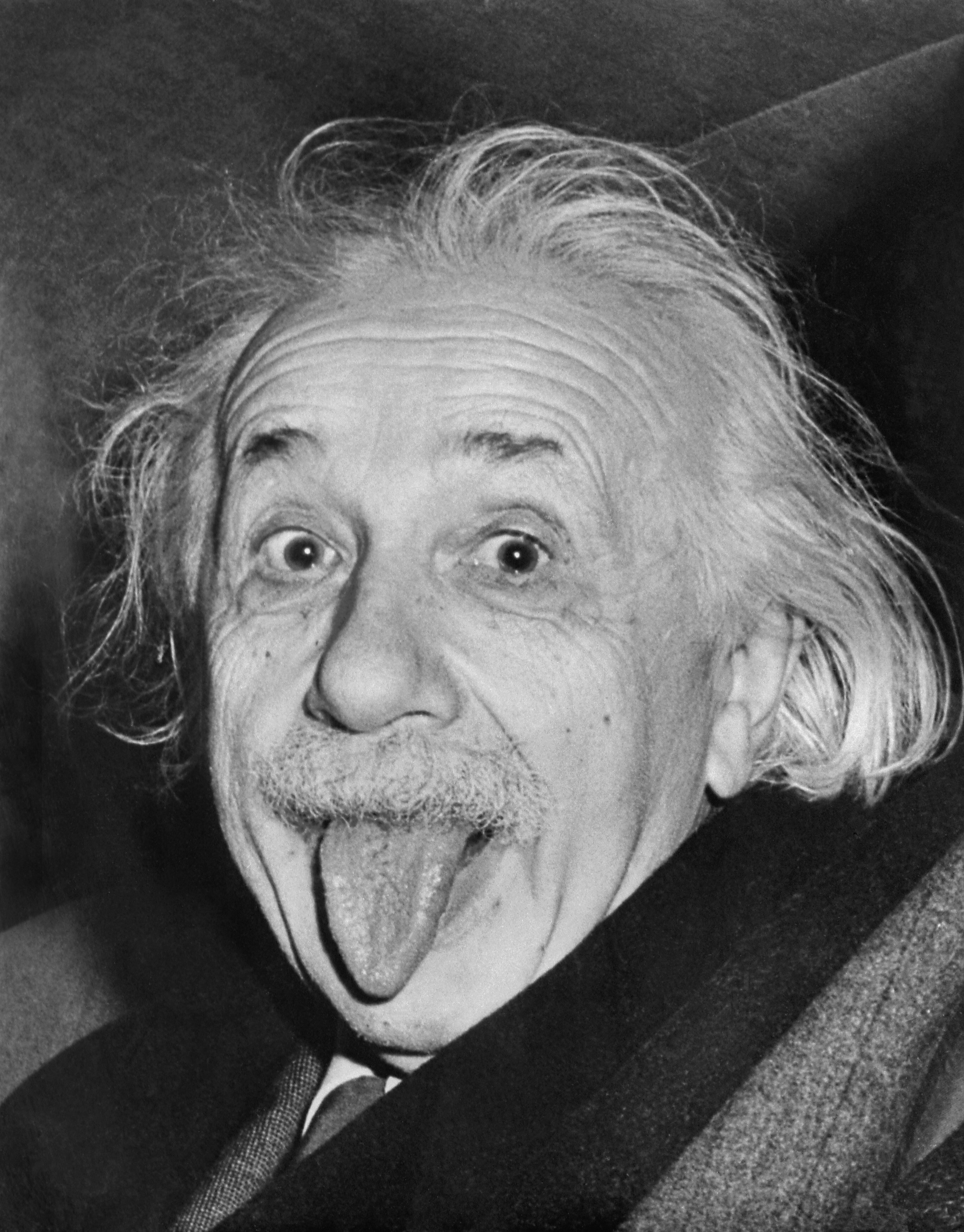
A photograph of Einstein taken by Arthur Sasse in 1951, sitting in a car on his 72nd birthday, having been asked to smile for the camera once again

The German-born theoretical physicist Albert Einstein has been the subject of (or inspiration for) many works of popular culture.

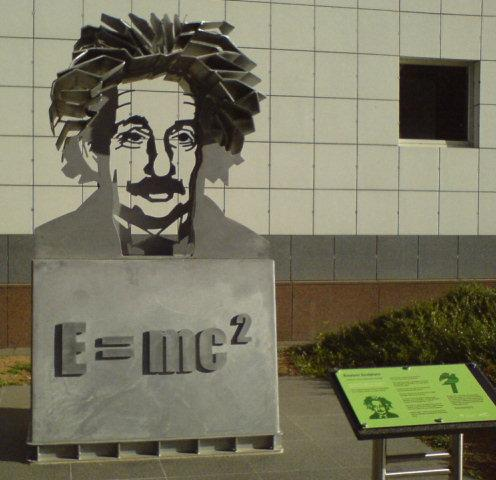
Einstein sculpture at Questacon in April 2008

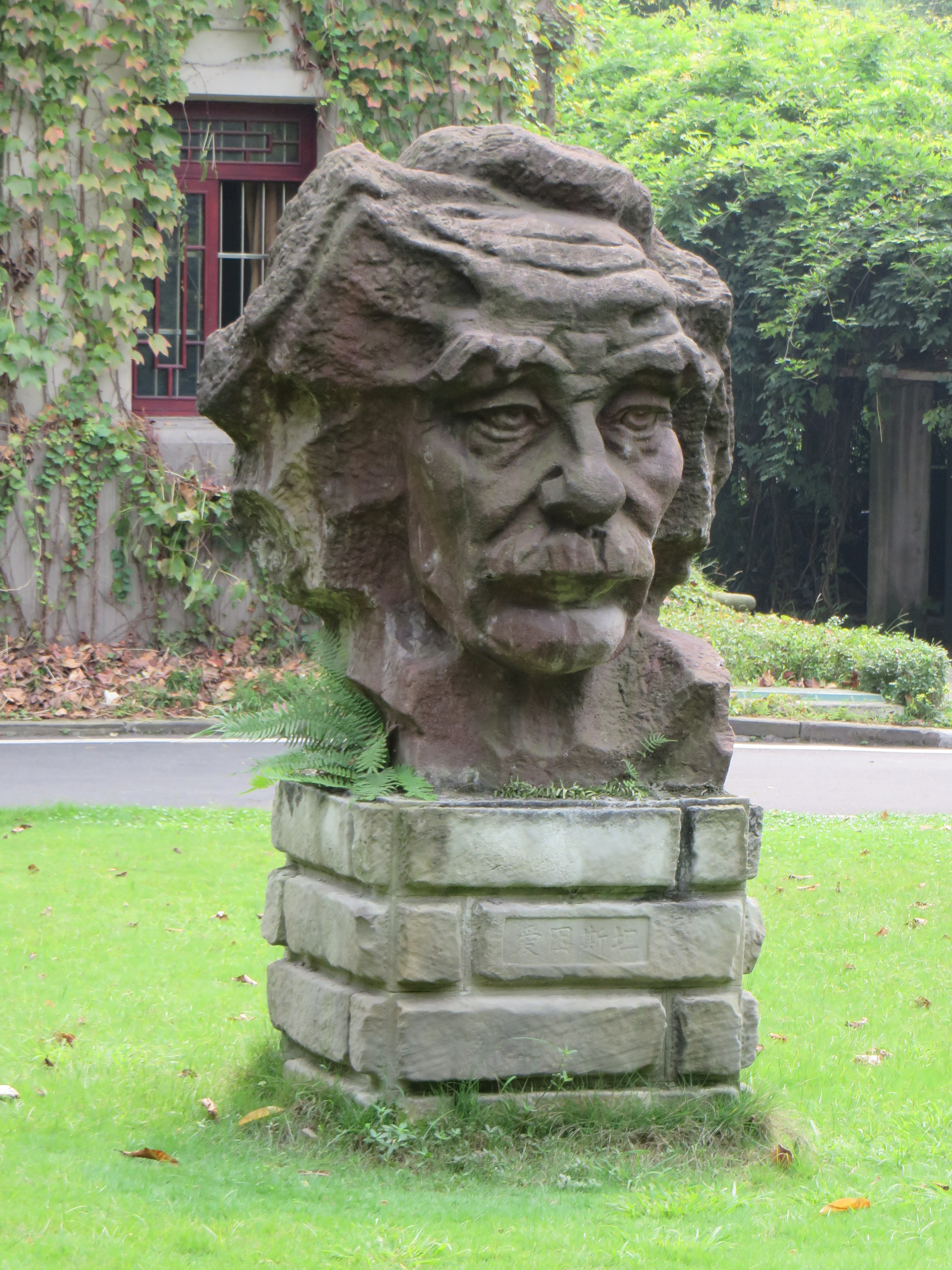
Bust of Einstein, Southwest University

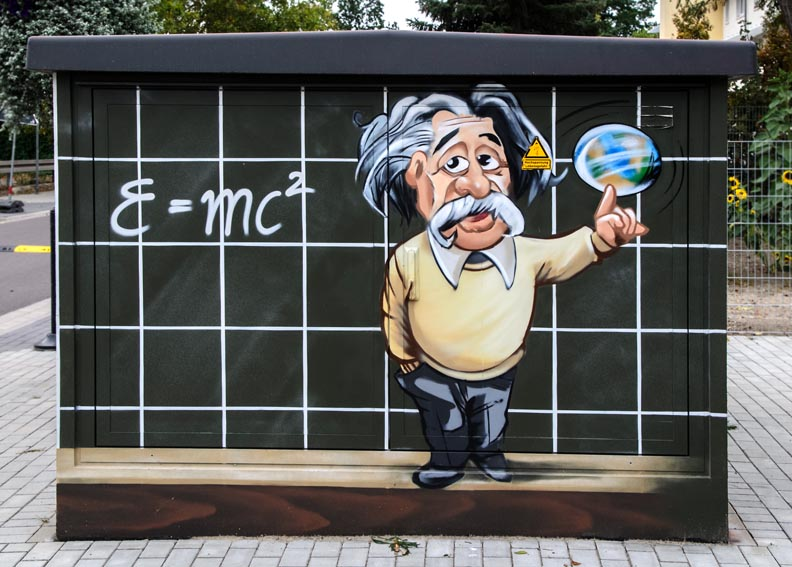
A cartoon of Albert Einstein

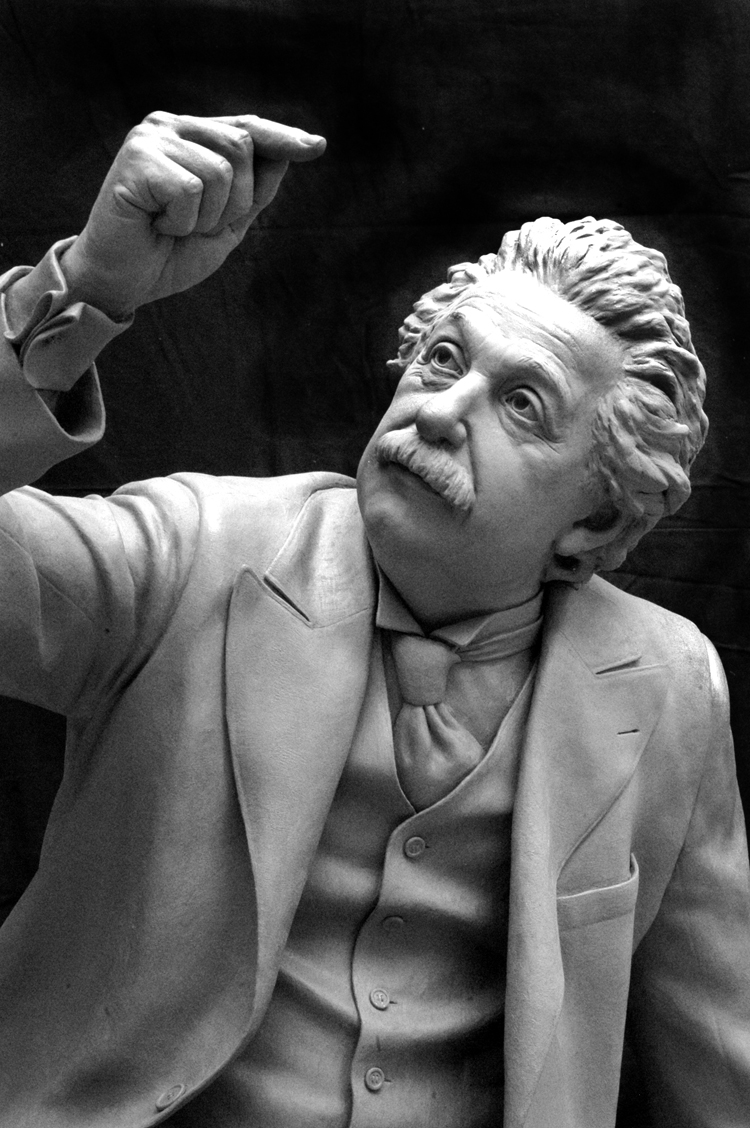
Statue of Einstein at the Griffith Observatory, Los Angeles

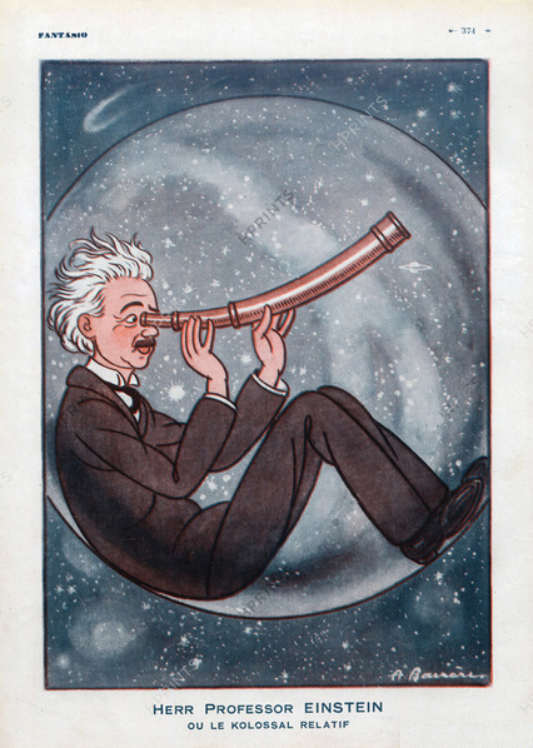
Adrien Barrère - Professor Einstein, 1930

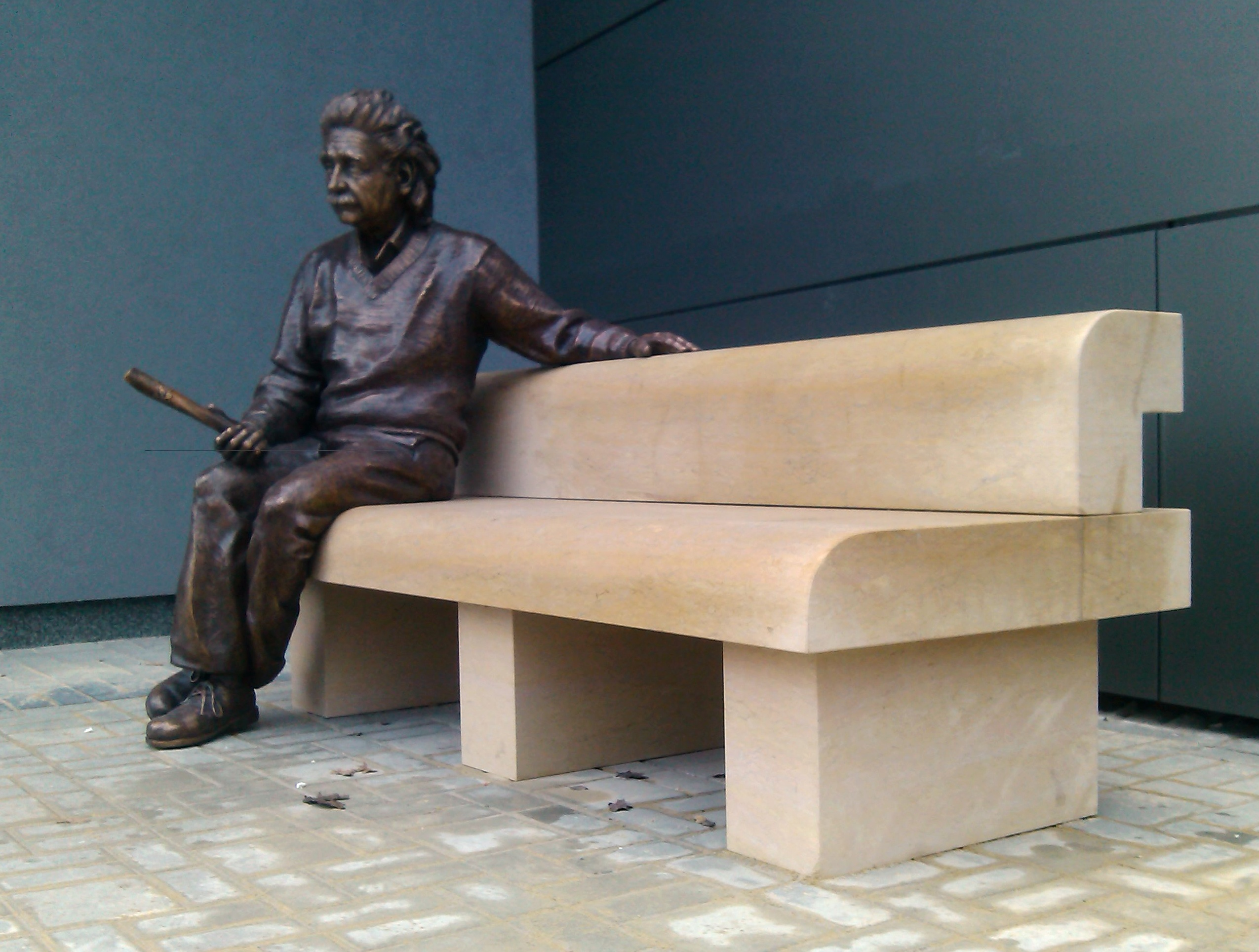
Albert Einstein - IQ Landia Liberec

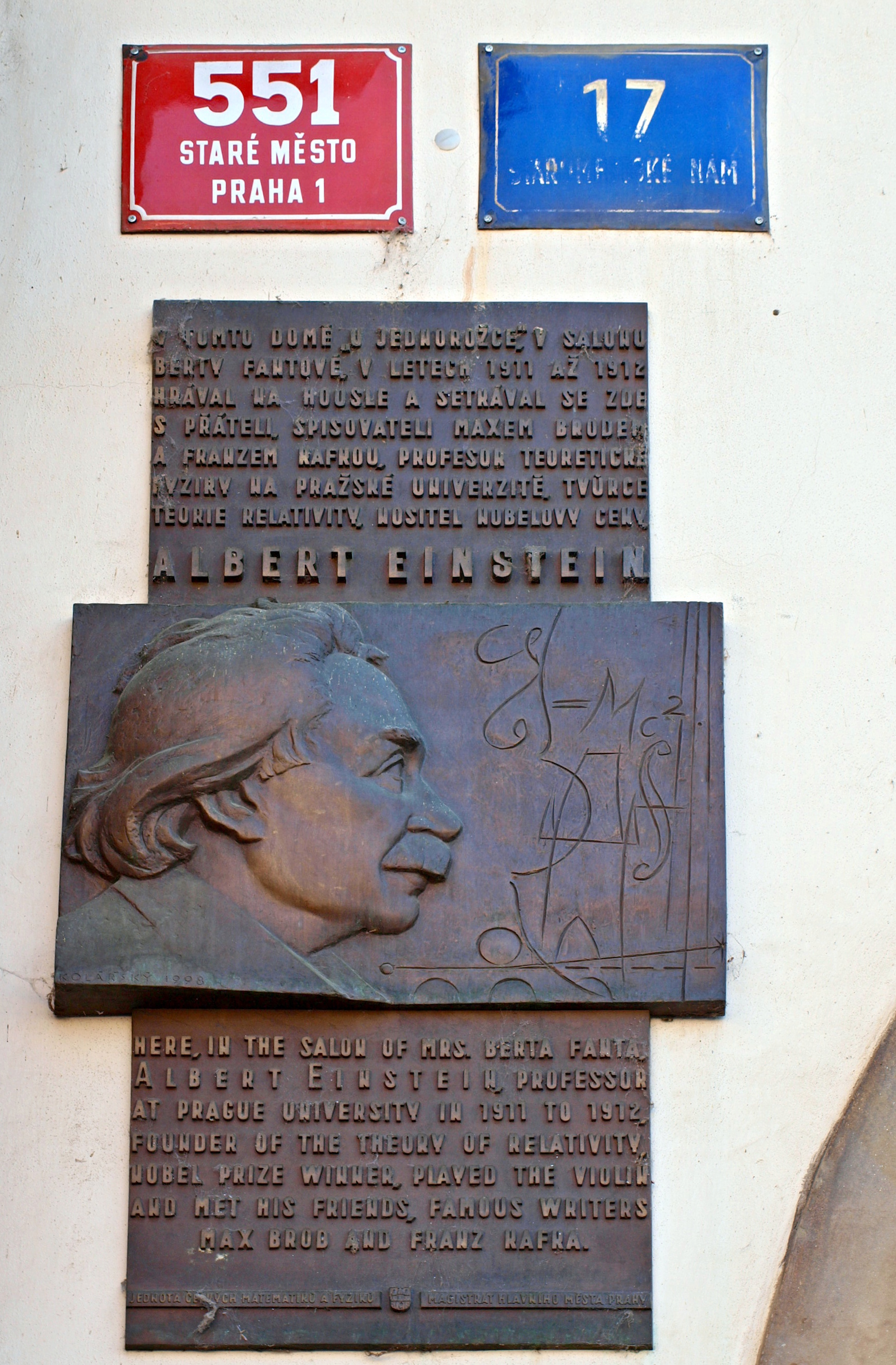
Einstein wall in Czech Republic

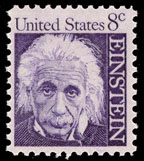
Albert Einstein on a 1966 US stamp

Einstein is a favorite model for depictions of absent-minded professors; his expressive face and distinctive hairstyles have been widely copied and exaggerated. Time magazine's Frederic Golden wrote that Einstein was "a cartoonist's dream come true".

"Einstein" has become a byword for an extremely intelligent person. It may also be used ironically when someone states the obvious or demonstrates a lack of wisdom or intelligence (as in "Way to go, Einstein!")

Many quotes that have become popular via the Internet have been misattributed to him, including "The definition of insanity is doing the same thing over and over and expecting a different result".

== Recognition ==
In 1999, leading physicists voted Einstein the "greatest physicist ever".

His birthday, March 14, is also Pi Day, so called because 3/14 (March 14 in shorthand month-day format) corresponds to 3.14, the first three digits of the number Pi. The town of Princeton, New Jersey, where Einstein lived for more than 20 years, celebrates March 14 every year as "Princeton Pi Day and Einstein Birthday Party".

=== Usage of his name and image ===
The children's television show Little Einsteins and the educational toys and videos of the Baby Einstein series both use Einstein's name, though not his image.

Iranian cartoonist and humorist Javad Alizadeh publishes a column titled "4D Humor" in his Persian monthly Humor & Caricature, which features cartoons, caricatures and stories on Einstein-related topics. In 1991, he published in the column a comic book on Einstein's life and work, inspired mainly by the theory of relativity.

On Einstein's 72nd birthday on March 14, 1951, United Press photographer Arthur Sasse was trying to persuade him to smile for the camera, but having smiled for photographers many times that day, Einstein stuck out his tongue instead. This photograph became one of the most popular ever taken of Einstein, often used in merchandise depicting him in a lighthearted sense. Einstein enjoyed this photo and requested UPI to give him nine copies for personal use, one of which he signed for a reporter. On June 19, 2009, the original signed photograph was sold at auction for $74,324, a record for an Einstein picture at the time. The photo was sold again on July 27, 2017 for $125,000.

Salesforce acquired a 20-year license in 2016 for $20 million to be the only business-oriented software company permitted to use his likeness. Einstein's likeness is used as a company mascot and his name is used for the company's artificial intelligence features.

=== Licensing ===
Einstein bequeathed his estate, as well as the use of his image (see personality rights), to the Hebrew University of Jerusalem, which from the mid-1980s has sponsored the Einstein Papers Project with the Princeton University Press. Einstein actively supported the university during his life and this support continues with the royalties received from licensing activities. GreenLight licences the commercial use of the name "Albert Einstein" and associated imagery and likenesses of Einstein, as agent for the Hebrew University of Jerusalem. As head licensee, the corporation can control commercial usage of Einstein's name and theoretically ensure compliance with certain standards (e.g., when Einstein's name is used as a trademark, the ™ symbol must be used).

In 2012, Judge Howard Matz of a United States district court found that although a General Motors advertisement featuring Einstein's image was "tasteless", it was not illegal. Judge Matz wrote that "the obviously humorous ad for the 2010 Terrain having been published 55 years or more after Einstein's death, it is unlikely that any viewer of it could reasonably infer that Einstein, or whoever succeeded to any right of publicity that Einstein may have had, was endorsing the GMC Terrain".

Hebrew University asked that publicity rights be extended to the 70 years associated with copyright protection. Judge Matz declined, stating "the Ninth Circuit recently noted that Marilyn Monroe considered herself to belong 'to the Public and to the world'". He also stated: "There is no evidence that Albert Einstein saw himself that way, but he did become the symbol and embodiment of genius. His persona has become thoroughly ingrained in our cultural heritage. Now, nearly 60 years after his death, that persona should be freely available to those who seek to appropriate it as part of their own expression, even in tasteless ads".

=== Handedness ===
There is a persistent popular belief that Einstein was left-handed, but there is no evidence that he was, and the belief has been called a myth. Einstein wrote with his right hand and authoritative sources state flatly that he was right-handed. An autopsy on Einstein's brain showed a symmetry between the two hemispheres, rather than a left-sided dominance as is typical of most right-handed people or a right-sided dominance as found in most left-handed people.

=== Educational institutions ===
Several schools, colleges and universities are named after Einstein, including in Germany, Honduras and the United States.

== In science fiction ==
Science fiction scholar Gary Westfahl has described Einstein as an unusually prominent cultural icon in science fiction, attributing this status to a combination of his scientific achievements, celebrity, and distinctive public persona. Einstein has consequently appeared in numerous works of fiction in a variety of forms, including portrayals of the historical Einstein, simulated or fictionalized versions of him, and characters modelled on him. Science-fictional portrayals have particularly associated Einstein with time travel, alternate history, advanced technology, and fictional extensions of his scientific work.

== In media and drama ==
=== Stage ===
Einstein has been the subject of or inspiration for many novels, films, and plays, such as Steve Martin's comedic play Picasso at the Lapin Agile. He was the subject of Paul Dessau's 1974 opera Einstein and in Philip Glass's 1976 opera Einstein on the Beach; his humorous side is the subject of Ed Metzger's one-man play Albert Einstein: The Practical Bohemian. He features prominently in Daniel Kehlmann's play about Kurt Gödel, Ghosts in Princeton (2011).

=== Film ===
The 1988 film Young Einstein presents a fictionalized version of Einstein’s early life. In this version, he is the son of a Tasmanian apple farmer who not only develops the theory of relativity, but also surfing and rock ‘n roll. His theory, e=mc^{2} is shown as method for splitting beer atoms.

Einstein was portrayed by Ludwig Stössel in the 1947 film The Beginning or the End.

He was the subject (along with Arthur Eddington) of the BBC Two film Einstein and Eddington (featuring David Tennant as Eddington and Andy Serkis as Einstein, and detailing Einstein's development of his theories and Eddington's attempts to prove them) and in Yahoo Serious's intentionally inaccurate biography of Einstein as an Australian in the film Young Einstein (although the movie is fictionalized).

An Einstein-like character appears in Nicolas Roeg's 1985 film Insignificance. Set in New York in 1953, the film includes a scene in which "The Professor" (played by Michael Emil), the character evidently representing Albert Einstein, discusses relativity with "The Actress" (Theresa Russell), a Marilyn Monroe-like character.

Einstein was portrayed by Walter Matthau in the 1994 romantic comedy film I.Q.

In the 2001 film A.I.: Artificial Intelligence, he was portrayed as a holographic personality called Dr. Know (voiced by Robin Williams).

In the film Night at the Museum: Battle of the Smithsonian, he and the other bobbleheads live in the Air and Space Museum.

The 2009 film The Nutcracker in 3D includes a character named Uncle Albert (played by Nathan Lane) who resembles Einstein, speaks with a German accent, and recites Albert Einstein quotes, but is never explicitly identified as Einstein.

The Star Wars character Yoda's wrinkles were modeled after Einstein's to give the impression of exceptional intelligence.

In the film Back to the Future, Dr. Emmett 'Doc' Brown (played by Christopher Lloyd and portrayed as a brilliant scientist, time traveler and inventor) has a dog named Einstein, who is named after Brown's favorite scientist and bears a superficial resemblance to him. Lloyd also credited Einstein as being his inspiration for the character.

In the 2011 film Transformers: Dark of the Moon, the Autobot Que sports an Einstein-inspired head design, including his wild hairstyle, dapper mustache, and eyes. However, his accent is often confused for being German because of these similarities. Like his G1 counterpart and Einstein alike, he is one of the most intelligent members of his team, and is an accomplished scientist and inventor. However, his onscreen name "Que" was derived from Professor Q, a James Bond character, who also inspired Wheeljack/Que's overall character.

In the 2014 CGI-animated film, Mr. Peabody & Sherman, Einstein only appeared in the film's climax, voice-portrayed by Mel Brooks.

Einstein was portrayed by David Shackleton in the 2018 film Holmes & Watson.

In the 2023 film Oppenheimer, Einstein was portrayed by Tom Conti.

=== Television ===
A holographic representation of Einstein (played by Jim Norton) appeared in two episodes of Star Trek: The Next Generation. He first appears to debate physics with Reginald Barclay in "The Nth Degree". Norton returns in the first part of "Descent". The episode starts on the Enterprise with a game of poker being played by holodeck representations of Einstein, Sir Isaac Newton and Stephen Hawking (portrayed by himself). All are programmed by Lt. Commander Data, playing as the fourth person in the game.

In Dexter's Laboratory, Einstein is boy genius Dexter's hero.

The Voyagers! episode "The Travels of Marco...and Friends" begins with Bogg and Jeff landing in New York in 1930 and saving Einstein from a potentially fatal accident.

In The Super Mario Bros. Super Show, Einstein was played by Ed Metzger.

In Touched by an Angel, Einstein was played by Harold Gould.

In Eureka, the titular town was established when President Harry S. Truman commissioned development of a top-secret lab, staffed by Albert Einstein, after World War II and it became home to the scientists and their families working there.

In the Rick and Morty episode "A Rickle in Time", time-traveling monsters beat up Einstein, whom they had mistaken for Rick Sanchez.

In Genius, Einstein is portrayed by Geoffrey Rush and Johnny Flynn as the elder and younger Einstein respectively.

Einstein is portrayed by John Rubinstein in the Legends of Tomorrow episode "Out of Time". He is later mentioned in the episode "The Curse of the Earth Totem", where he was trapped in the ice age due to being displaced in time.

The German Netflix series Dark begins a with a quote about the perception of time by Einstein.

Einstein is portrayed by Eric Charters in episode 11 of season 13 "Staring Blindly into the Future" (January 13, 2020) of the Canadian television period drama Murdoch Mysteries where he explains the theory of general relativity. He is also mentioned in episode 13 of season 12 "Murdoch and the Undetectable Man" (January 28, 2019).

In 2023, the BBC produced the docudrama Einstein and the Bomb, featuring both stock footage of Einstein and dramatizations where he is played by Aidan McArdle.

In One Piece, Dr. Vegapunk is clearly inspired by Albert Einstein. He bears a strong physical resemblance to the scientist, and his protruding tongue references the famous photograph taken on Einstein's 72nd birthday. Continuing the homage, Vegapunk's English voice actor, Kent Williams, performs the character with an exaggerated German accent, reflecting Einstein's country of origin.

=== Web series ===
Einstein is one of the main characters in the web series Super Science Friends.

On the seventh episode of Epic Rap Battles of History, Einstein (portrayed by Zach Sherwin) faced off against Stephen Hawking (portrayed by series co-founder Nice Peter).

== In literature ==
Jean-Claude Carrière's 2005 French novel Einstein S'il Vous Plaît (Einstein If You Please) portrays a fictional conversation between Einstein and a student.

Alan Lightman's first book, Einstein's Dreams, consists of short stories which are portrayed as being the dreams of Einstein while he was working on the theory of relativity; these stories explain how time would work in imaginary parallel universes.

Novelist Jacob M. Appel's Einstein's Beach House relates a fictional battle over the settlement of Einstein's estate after his death.

David Bodanis's book E=mc^{2}: A Biography of the World's Most Famous Equation describes Einstein's equation which defines mass-energy equivalence, and the other scientists before during and after his time that contributed to the understanding we have about the equation.

Marie Hermanson's Swedish crime novel Den stora utställningen (The Great Exhibition) is set during the 1923 Gothenburg Exhibition where Einstein held his official Nobel Lecture after being awarded the 1921 Nobel Prize in Physics. In this fictional version of events, Einstein is the intended victim of an antisemitic murder plot and one of the viewpoint characters.

== In visual arts ==
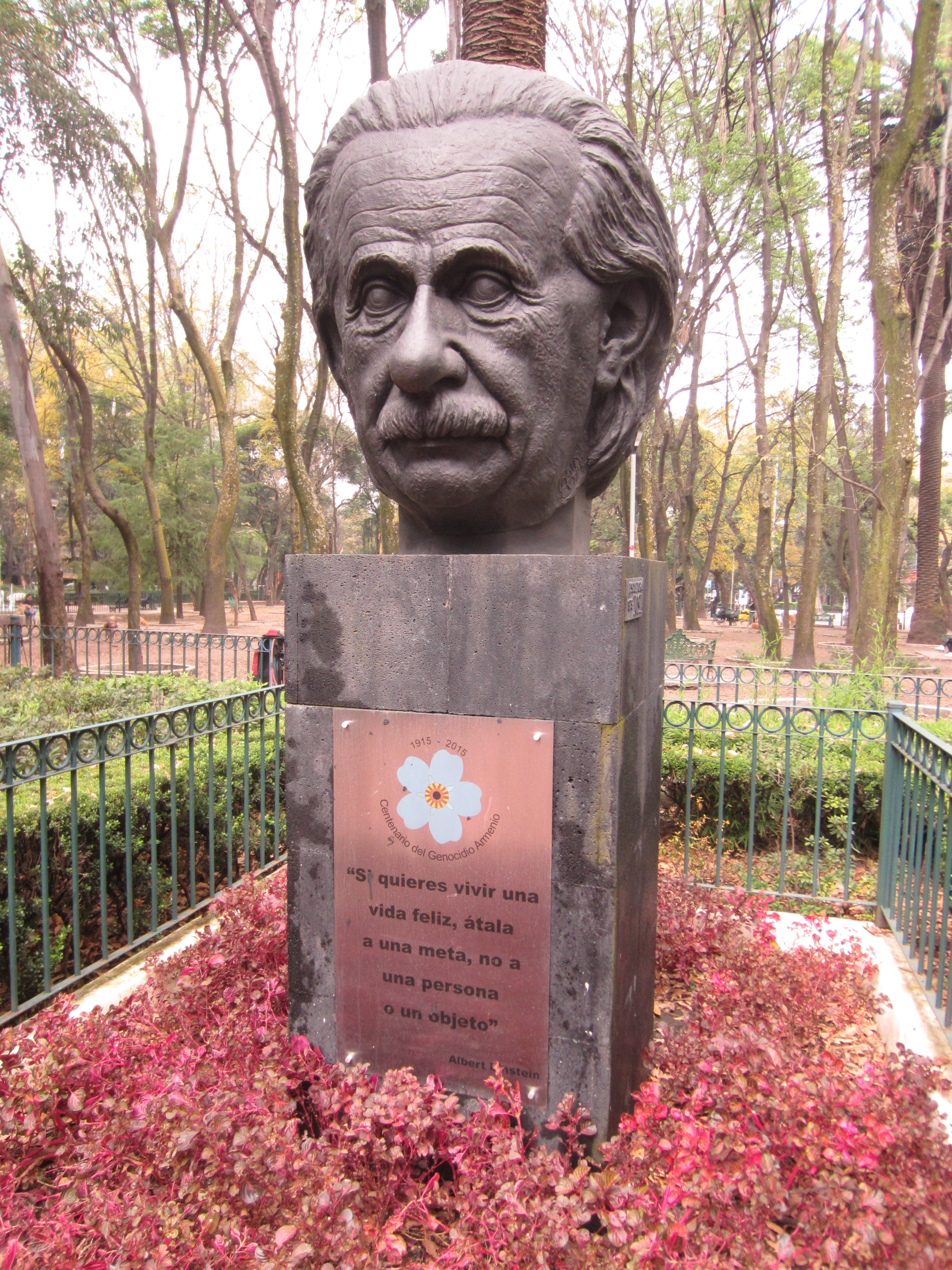
Bust of Einstein

In 1939, the Alley Oop comic strip introduced a time-traveling character named Dr. Elbert Wonmug, who has had several story lines in the strip ever since. "Wonmug" is a play on the English translation of the name "Einstein" -- "ein" meaning one (won) and "stein" meaning a style of drinking mug.

In 1940, Philadelphia artist Louis Hirshman created a caricature of Einstein using found objects, including a wild mop of hair, an abacus chest and shirt collar scribbled with the equation 2+2 = 2+2. In 1977, the piece was purchased by the Philadelphia Museum of Art.

== In music ==
- Einstein is one of the celebrities on the cover of the Beatles' Sgt. Pepper's Lonely Hearts Club Band.
- The Moody Blues include his likeness on the cover of A Question of Balance, released in 1970.
- Bob Dylan pays a tribute to him in a verse in "Desolation Row".
- Mariah Carey's eleventh studio album is entitled E=MC^{2} after Einstein's celebrated equation.
- Big Audio Dynamite featured a song titled E=MC2 on their first album This is Big Audio Dynamite.
- Carolina Crown Drum and Bugle Corps 2013 show was titled "E=MC^{2}", and won 1st place in the 2013 DCI World Class Championship.
- Tech N9ne's 2001 song "Einstein" is named after him.
- Kelly Clarkson's 2011 song "Einstein" is named after him.
- Greek singer Giorgos Lembesis released a song titled "Einstein", in which he states that he always admired Albert Einstein, but now he needs his help with his relationship problems.
- The song "Portrait (He Knew)" by Kansas is about Albert Einstein and his life.

== In typography ==
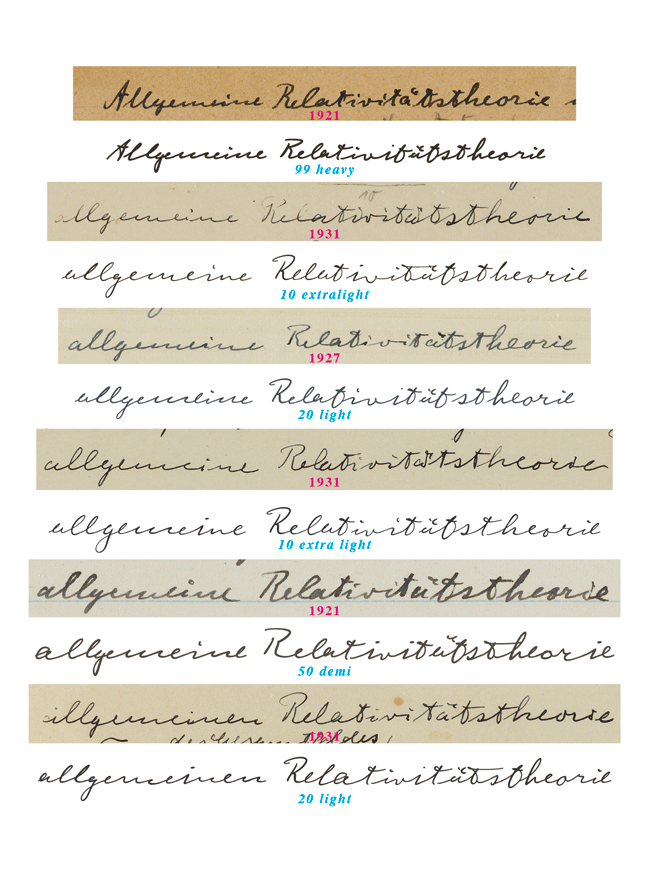
Comparison of Albert Einstein's handwriting between 1921 and 1931 and the Albert Einstein Font. The writing says "allgemeine Relativitätstheorie", German for "general theory of relativity".

Albert Einstein's handwriting has been digitised as a font in an art project by typographer Harald Geisler and dancer Elizabeth Waterhouse. The font enables the user to write like Einstein on a computer or smartphone. The project was created in collaboration with the Albert Einstein Archives Jerusalem and presented in 2015 on the crowdfunding platform Kickstarter where the campaign was supported by 2,334 backers. Each letter of the font is based on Einstein's manuscripts, different variations of each letter are stored in the font and exchanged automatically during typing to create a natural look.

The Albert Einstein font was used to reenact the 1932 letter exchange between Einstein and Sigmund Freud (published in 1933 under the title "Why War"). In 2017, at the 85th anniversary of the exchange, Harald Geisler presented the project on Kickstarter in collaboration with the Sigmund Freud Museum (Vienna) and the Albert Einstein Archives. Supporters of the project could choose to either receive the letters themselves or send them to politicians typeset in the handwriting of Einstein and Freud.

== In video games ==
- Einstein is an integral character in the Command & Conquer: Red Alert series, being responsible in Red Alert for altering the course of history using a time traveling device he created to remove Adolf Hitler from existence in an attempt to prevent the horrors of World War II, inadvertently leading to the Soviet Union's rise to power and conflict with Europe. He continues to be featured in the altered timeline in Red Alert and Red Alert 2, developing time travel technology for use by the Allies, and his fictional murder at the hands of the Soviets (also involving a time machine) is a central plot point of Red Alert 3.
- In the original Mega Man video game, Dr. Wily's design is inspired by Albert Einstein and was initially conceived to appear as a tall, thin scientist with a mustache, glasses, balding hair, and lab coat.
- In Half-Life, one of the scientist npc models is internally named "Einstein". Although it is actually modeled after George Washington.
- An Einstein pastiche, along pastiches of Tesla, Newton and Darwin, are enemies in the mobile game Realms of Pixel.

== See also ==
- List of things named after Albert Einstein
- Benjamin Franklin in popular culture
- Isaac Newton in popular culture
- Nikola Tesla in popular culture
- Thomas Edison in popular culture
