= Jazz in the Domain =

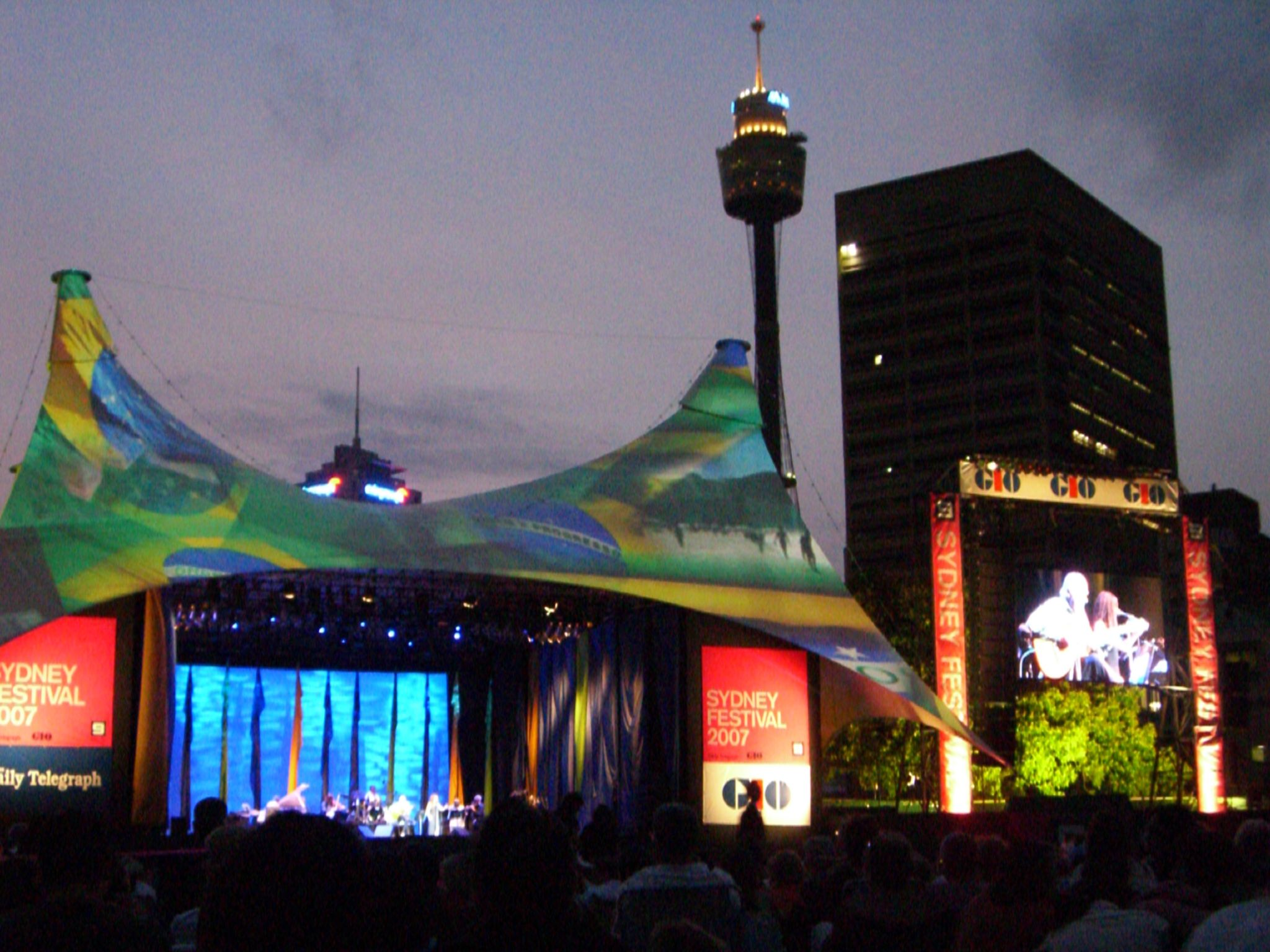
Jazz in the Domain at the Sydney Festival in 2007.

Jazz in The Domain was (until a name change in 2010) the first of several large, public, open-air concerts that take place in The Domain, Sydney during the local summer holiday month of January. As the first major public event of the Sydney Festival, it was often officially opened by the Lord Mayor of Sydney.

== History ==
Jazz in the Domain was traditionally held on the second Saturday evening of January and was then followed by its two sister concerts Symphony in The Domain and Opera in The Domain on the third and fourth Saturday evenings in January respectively.

Although the concert continues to be held it was renamed 'Summer Sounds in the Domain' for the 2010 Festival and since then it has moved away from the mainstream jazz, featuring instead a variety of world musicians.

Prior to its renaming in 2010 the concert was usually fronted by one or more famous Australian jazz music identities. Su Cruickshank, Ricky May and James Morrison (musician) all headlined the concert over the years.

== Attendance ==
As with the other summer concerts in The Domain, Jazz in the Domain usually attracted crowds of up to 100,000 people (in good weather), filling the area to capacity.

The main performances usually started around dusk although entertainment was often provided for people who arrived early. Many people arrive at all the summer concerts in The Domain hours prior to the official start time so as to gain the best spots close to the stage.

== Concerts by year ==
- The 2010: Toumani Diabate's Symmetric Orchestra with Vieux Farka Toure
- The 2009: "The Gypsy Queens & Kings", with Fanfare Ciocarlia and special guest singers including Macedonia's "Queen of the Gypsy Singers" Esma Redzepova, Bulgarian star Jony Iliev, Hungarian Mitsou and Romanian Florentina Sandu.
- The 2008: "El Barrio" with the "Spanish Harlem Orchestra".
- The 2007: "Noite Brasil", with Oscar Castro-Neves, Airto Moreira, Abraham Laboriel and Alex Acuna.
