= Reckless Kelly =

- Theatrical release poster
- Directed by: Yahoo Serious
- Written by: Yahoo Serious; Warwick Ross; David Roach; Lulu Serious
- Produced by: Yahoo Serious; Warwick Ross
- Starring: Yahoo Serious; Melora Hardin; Alexei Sayle; Hugo Weaving
- Cinematography: Kevin Hayward
- Edited by: Lawrence Jordan
- Music by: Anthony Marinelli; Tommy Tycho
- Production company: Serious Productions
- Distributed by: Warner Bros. (through Roadshow Distributors)
- Release date: 8 April 1993
- Running time: 103 minutes
- Country: Australia
- Language: English
- Budget: A$20 million (est.)
- Box office: A$5.4 million

Reckless Kelly is a 1993 Australian comedy film produced, written, directed and starring Yahoo Serious. It co-stars Melora Hardin, Alexei Sayle and Hugo Weaving. The story is a satirical take on a modern-day Ned Kelly, a famous Australian outlaw.

== Plot ==
A modern-day Ned Kelly robs banks in Australia and gives all the money to the poor people. Ned is forced to go to Hollywood to make enough money to save his family's land. As it goes against his belief, he cannot simply rob banks there for his own benefit. Ned is forced to find another way to come up with the $1 million required to save his family island. That is when a movie producer shows up and gives Ned an offer he cannot refuse.

== Cast ==
- Yahoo Serious as Ned Kelly
- Melora Hardin as Robin Banks
- Alexei Sayle as Major Wib
- Hugo Weaving as Sir John
- Kathleen Freeman as Mrs. Delance
- John Pinette as Sam Delance
- Bob Maza as Dan Kelly
- Martin Ferrero as Ernie the Fan
- Anthony Ackroyd as Joe Kelly
- Max Walker as Newsreader
- Willie Fennell as Mr. Arnold
- Tracy Mann as Miss Twisty
- Tyler Coppin as Hollywood Bank Teller
- Robert Alan Beuth as Beverly Hills Bank Teller
- Lulu Pinkus as Hollywood Supermarket Checkout

== Production ==
The film was financed by Warner Bros, Village Roadshow and the Australian Film Finance Corporation. Serious used many of the same key creatives he had on Young Einstein.

== Reception ==
Neil Jillett, film critic for The Age wrote, "There are some good gags along the way, and a few of the plot's twists have an entertainingly surreal zaniness. But there is much heavy going too. Most of the messages Serious loads into the film—protect the environment, hate violence and banks, mock the British, go for a republic, sneer at American fads and religious hypocrisy—are presented with a smugness that was missing from Young Einstein".

== Box office ==
Reckless Kelly opened at number one at the Australian box office with a gross of $2,036,224. It remained at number one for a second week and went on to gross $5,444,534 at the Australian box office.

== Soundtrack ==
Reckless Kelly

Soundtrack album by various artists
- Released: April 1993
- Label: Picture This

Singles from Reckless Kelly
- 1. "Wild Thing" Released: March 1993; 2. "I Fought the Law" Released: April 1993

=== Track listing ===
No.	Title	Writer(s)	Length
1.	"Born to Be Wild" (by INXS)	Mars Bonfire	3:52
2.	"I Fought the Law" (by The Dukes)	Sonny Curtis	2:57
3.	"Wild Thing" (by Divinyls)	Chip Taylor	4:15
4.	"Awabakelly" (by Yahoo Serious)	Yahoo Serious; Alan Dargin	1:18
5.	"Djäpana" (by Yothu Yindi)	Mandawuy Yunupiŋu	4:03
6.	"Ride" (by Mental As Anything)	Martin Plaza	3:16
7.	"Handle the Flame" (by Anthony Warlow)	Serious; David Roach; Tycha	2:32
8.	"Happiness Is a Warm Gun" (by The Dukes)	Lennon–McCartney	3:03
9.	"Reckless Angles" (by Yahoo Serious)	Serious; Tycha	0:39
10.	"From a Million Miles" (by Single Gun Theory)	Single Gun Theory	4:36
11.	"Faith" (by The Dukes)	Sean Kelly; Geoffrey Stapleton	3:20
12.	"As You Like It" (by Steve Kilbey)	Kilbey	4:28
13.	"Bedazzled" (by Succotash)	Succotash	3:52
14.	"Reckless" (by James Reyne)	Reyne	6:06
15.	"Happy On My Way" (by Doyle Lawson & Quicksilver)	Pete Pyle	1:59
16.	"Such Is Life" (by Yahoo Serious and Victorian Philharmonic Orchestra)	Serious; Tycha	0:57
17.	"Handle the Flame (finale)" (by Anthony Warlow)	Serious; David Roach; Tycha	0:26

=== Charts ===
Weekly chart performance for Reckless Kelly
Chart (1993)	Peak position
Australian Albums (ARIA)	22

== See also ==
- Cinema of Australia
