= Sydney Festival =

Arts and cultural festival in Australia

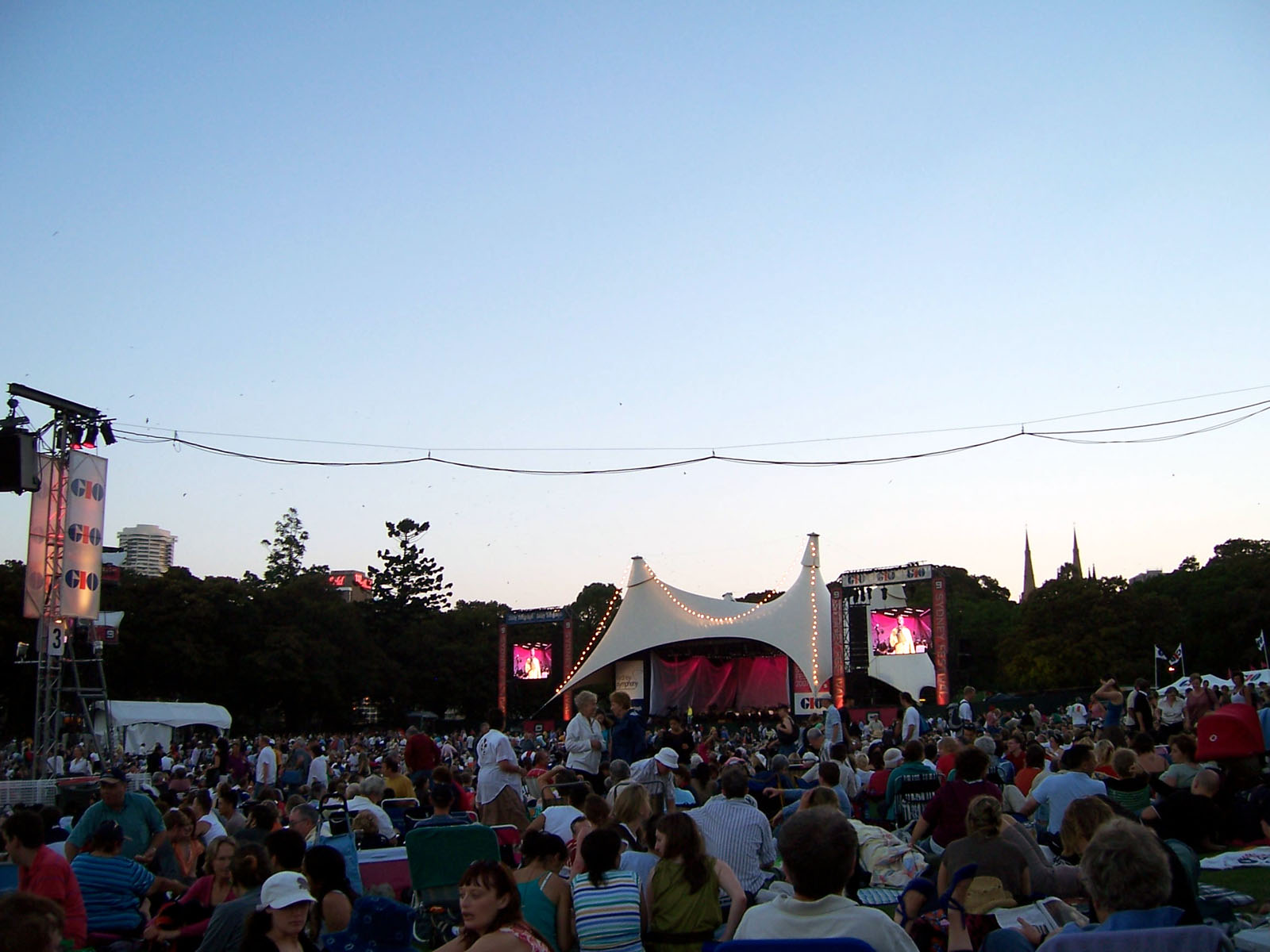
- Part of Sydney Festival, Symphony in The Domain, pictured in 2007
- Genre: Major arts, theatre, music and cultural festival
- Begins: Second week of January
- Ends: Final week of January
- Frequency: Annually
- Location: Sydney
- Years active: 49
- Inaugurated: 1977
- Participants: 964 artists (2019)
- Attendance: 365,000 to free events (2019); 107,000 to ticketed events (2019)
- Patron: Margaret Beazley
- Website: www.sydneyfestival.org.au

Sydney Festival is a major arts festival in Australia's largest city, Sydney, that runs for three weeks every January since it was established in 1977. The festival program features over 100 events from local and international artists and includes contemporary and classical music, dance, circus, drama, visual arts and artist talks. The festival attracts approximately 500,000 people to its large-scale free outdoor events and 150,000 to its ticketed events and contributes more than A$55 million to the economy of New South Wales.

== History ==
The origins of Sydney Festival are in the Waratah Festival, which was established in 1956 by the Sydney Committee and took place from late October to early November, coinciding with the blooming of the NSW emblematic flower, the Waratah. It was an important cultural event that included a parade, a popular art competition, beauty contests, exhibitions, performances and the Lord Mayor's reception at the Sydney Town Hall.

Sydney Festival was established by the Sydney Committee, the NSW State Government and the City of Sydney with a view to attracting people into the city centre during the summer holiday month of January. In many ways it is probably still best understood as a celebration of Sydney and what the city has to offer. In the festival's early years, its program offered everything from vintage car rallies, face-painting and kite-flying to bocce, dog obedience trials and Chinese scarf dancing.

For three weeks the festival offers a program of more than 330 performances and 100 events involving 900 artists from 17 countries, covering dance, theatre, music, visual arts, cross media and forums. In any given year, the program's diversity might include burlesque circus to New York rap to Russian theatre; from contemporary dance to family programs to traditional Indigenous arts practice. The festival uses at least 30 venues including the city's main theatre venues such as Sydney Theatre, Carriageworks, City Recital Hall and venues at Sydney Opera House and in Parramatta, as well as community halls, parks and the city streets themselves.

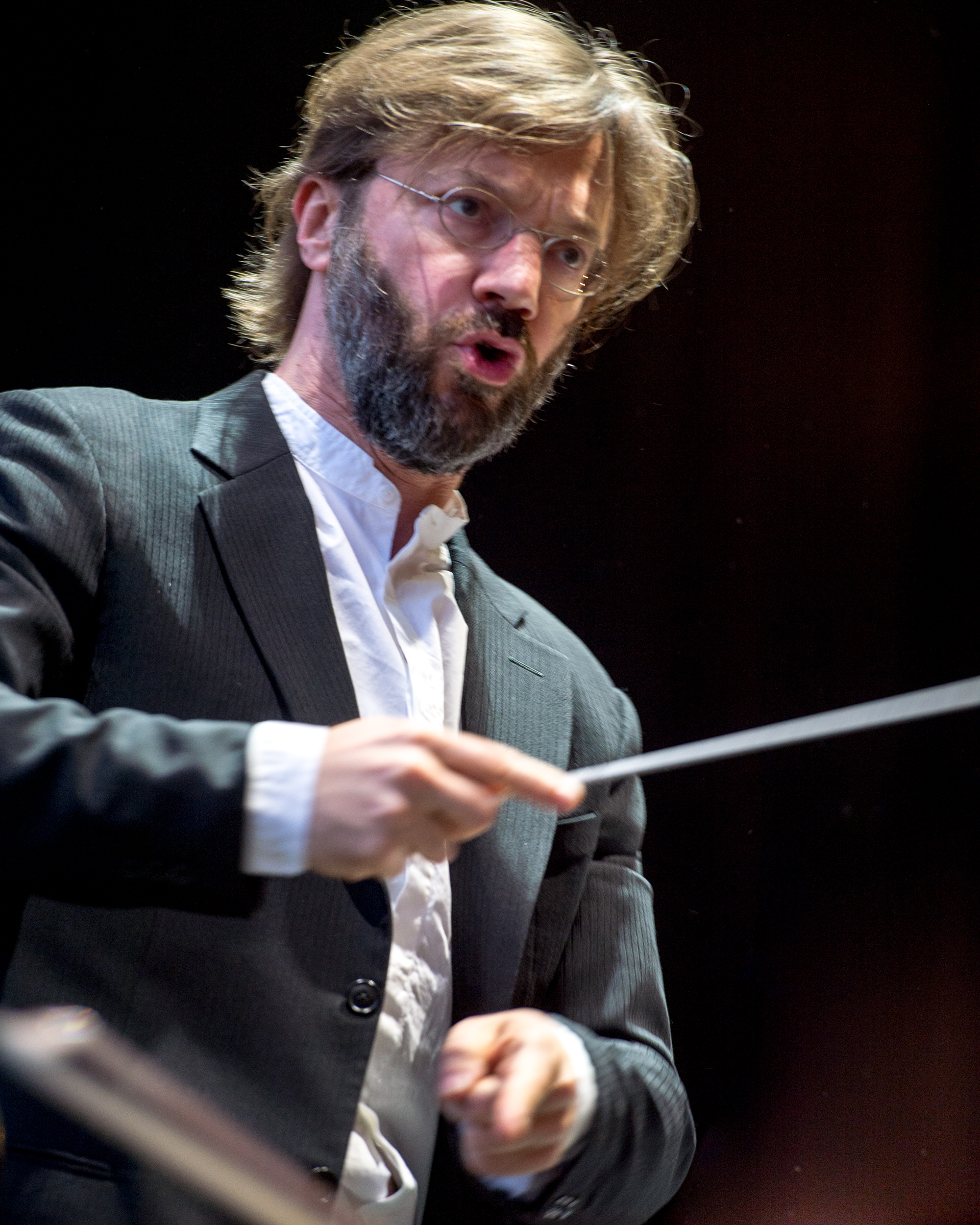
André de Ridder at the Sydney Festival Symphony in the Domain 40th Birthday concert in 2016

Sydney Festival presents a number of large-scale free outdoor events including the long-running Concerts in The Domain, each attracting up to 60,000 people, a decrease from peaks of 80,000 people during earlier years. At its peak, it is estimated that the festival attracted 1.5 million people.

The Festival has a history of presenting Australian premieres and many of Australia's most memorable productions such as Cloudstreet have resulted from Sydney Festival's commitment to nurture local artists. It has brought many of the world's great artists to Sydney for the first time including: Ariane Mnouchkine and Thèâtre du Soleil (Flood Drummers), Robert Wilson (The Black Rider), Robert Lepage (Far Side of the Moon, The Andersen Project, Lipsynch), George Piper Dances, Netherlands Dance Theatre, James Thiérrée (Junebug Symphony, Au Revoir Parapluie), Philip Glass, Ian McKellen (Dance of Death), Batsheva Dance Company, National Theatre of Scotland (Black Watch, Aalst), Christopher Wheeldon Company, All Tomorrow's Parties, Al Green, Katona Jozsef Theatre, Bon Iver, Grizzly Bear, The National, Sufjan Stevens and Joanna Newsom.

A survey of 1,500 attendees conducted during the 2011 festival revealed that patrons mainly live in Greater Sydney (83%), with approximately 11,500 visitors from interstate and overseas attending festival events.

Not without controversy, the festival has faced challenges with profitability in its early years and was subject to a riot at a New Year's Eve concert at Sydney Opera House in 1980, when 68 people were arrested and 150 were taken to hospital; and criticism about the festival's artistic credibility.

== Sydney Festival Program ==
The Festival's inclusive programming, broad range of free events and accessible pricing policies for the ticketed shows means that Sydney Festival is open to all. Within the program there is always a group of shows – all about an hour long – with $35 tickets. Tickets to all performances are available on the day for only $25 at the Tix for Next to Nix booth in Martin Place in the heart of Sydney's CBD.

From 2008 to 2012 the Festival's free opening event was Festival First Night, attracting approximately 200,000 people into the city centre.

Sydney Festival program highlights include Schaubuhne Berlin's Hamlet, Headlong's Six Characters in Search of an Author, Peter Sellars' Oedipus Rex & Symphony of Psalms, 43 Rajastani musicians in The Manganiyar Seduction, Al Green, Fabulous Beast's Giselle and Rian, John Cale, Grizzly Bear, Grace Jones, Laura Marling, James Thiérrée, Björk, Patrick Watson, Manu Chao, David Byrne, Herrenhausen's fashion opera Semele Walk with costumes by Vivienne Westwood, Sasha Waltz' Dido and Aeneas, Antony; and many more.

Sydney Festival has a strong tradition of creating opportunities for Australian artists, with 23 world premières of new Australian work across the 2013 and 2014 Festivals.

The free program for Sydney Festival includes concerts in The Domain or Parramatta, such as the outdoor concert by Indian superstar AR Rahman (with an audience of 50,000 people) in 2010, and the much-loved annual Ferrython with four Sydney ferries racing around Sydney Harbour.

The Festival's late night venues, both presenting contemporary music, are the Festival Paradiso Bar and Festival Village in Hyde Park with the latter hosting The Famous Spiegeltent, a traditional European wooden dance hall.

As a part of corporate responsibility, the festival has a Reconciliation Action Plan which envisages engaging with Aboriginal and Torres Strait Islander artists and communities to positively contribute towards closing the gap between Indigenous and other Australians.

== Boycott ==
In May 2020 Sydney Festival received $20,000 sponsorship from the Israeli Embassy to support Sydney Dance Company production of Decadence, created by Israeli choreographer Ohad Naharin and Tel Aviv's Batsheva Dance Company. The Sydney Festival listed Israel as a "star partner" on the festival website. A coalition of anti-apartheid advocates and organisations met with Sydney Festival in late 2021 to request the removal of Israel as a star partner of the event, which the festival refused.

In December 2021 the Palestine Justice Movement Sydney announced a boycott of the 2022 Sydney Festival, urging "artists who oppose apartheid to withdraw their participation from the festival", for "all members of the public who oppose apartheid to not attend Festival events" and for "Festival board members who oppose apartheid to resign from the board". The boycott is consistent with global movement Boycott Divestment and Sanctions that aims to use economic sanctions to end Israel's oppression of Palestinians.

By the start of the festival, more than 25 acts had pulled out, including comedian Tom Ballard, Nazeem Hussain, the Belvoir Theatre production of Black Brass, First Nations dance company Marrugeku, Arab Theatre Studio, and Bankstown Poetry Slam.

== Festival directors ==
Director	Years active	Country of origin	Notes
Stephen Hall	1977–1994	Australian	Appointed in November 1975, initially as executive director and later as general manager. Hall's contract was terminated three days short of his 18th festival after the 1994 festival suffered a loss of about $500,000, the biggest in its history.
Anthony Steel	1995–1997	Australian	
Leo Schofield	1998–2001	Australian	Schofield's tenure included overlap as artistic director of the arts festival associated with the 2000 Summer Olympics and 2000 Summer Paralympics
Brett Sheehy	2002–2005	Australian	Sheehy went on to be appointed artistic director of the Adelaide Festival from 2006 to 2008, followed by the Melbourne Festival from 2009 to 2012.
Fergus Linehan	2006–2009	Irish	
Lindy Hume	2010–2012	Australian	
Lieven Bertels	2013–2016	Belgian	After his successful first Sydney Festival in 2013, Bertels' contract got extended to include the 2016 festival, the 40th anniversary edition.
Wesley Enoch	2017–2021	Australian	Playwright and artistic director who had previously directed six projects for Sydney Festival, Enoch brought fresh perspectives by Indigenous Australian artists and performers to the festival.
Olivia Ansell	2021–present	Australian	Within the first six months of her appointment, Sydney Festival received $20,000 sponsorship from the Israeli Embassy which resulted in a boycott of Ansell's debut festival in 2022

== See also ==
- Symphony in the Domain
- Summer Sounds in the Domain
- Opera in The Domain
- List of festivals in Australia
