= Su Cruickshank =

- Born: Susan Cruickshank; 31 August 1946; Newcastle, New South Wales, Australia
- Died: 8 December 2009 (aged 63) Newcastle, New South Wales, Australia
- Genre: Jazz
- Occupations: Singer; actress; writer
- Instrument: Vocals
- Years active: 1970s–2009

Susan Cruickshank (31 August 1946 – 8 December 2009) was an Australian jazz and blues singer, actress, writer and entertainer. She was well known though her live performances with her group Trios Los Conchos and her appearances in TV, film and radio. Regarded as one of the finest female jazz singers in Australian history, she was nicknamed "The Queen of Jazz" and "The Diva on the Hill".

== Early life ==
Cruickshank was born in Newcastle, New South Wales, the eldest of four children of pharmacist Duncan Cruickshank and his wife Joyce. She grew up in the suburb of Adamstown in a musical family. Her father played double bass and her paternal grandmother had been a singer.

== Career ==
In the 1970s, Cruickshank moved to London and worked as a singer in a variety of low-end jazz clubs. She returned to Australia in 1979 and began to rise to public prominence, notably through successfully hosting a string of Sydney's annual Jazz in the Domain summer outdoor concerts.

She subsequently appeared in many Australian film and television roles and was especially well known for her role as Mrs Einstein, the mother of Yahoo Serious in the 1988 surprise hit (in Australia) film Young Einstein and, from 1992, for her regular appearances on Bert Newton's top-rating nationally-broadcast morning entertainment show Good Morning Australia.

In 1993-4 she hosted her own talk show on ABC TV called In Company with Su Cruickshank and continued to make frequent guest appearances in a wide variety of Australian drama, comedy and light entertainment programs for the rest of the decade, as well as appearing in a number of TV commercials. She maintained a long-running fortnightly radio spot on the nationally broadcast ABC Local Radio Overnights program and is often remembered for her appearances on the nationally televised World Series Debates that were a gala event of the Melbourne International Comedy Festival in the early 1990s.

A large woman, Cruickshank briefly co-owned a Portuguese-themed restaurant in Newtown, New South Wales, in the late 1990s and often made use of her size in her onstage and onscreen personas and it became a signature part of her public image.

== Death ==
Cruickshank suffered from a long-term illness in her last years and she died on 8 December 2009. A memorial concert was held to celebrate her life in her home town of Newcastle a week after her death.

== Personal life ==
Cruickshank married and divorced in the 1970s and never remarried. She had two stepchildren, Effie and Saabeah Theos, to her Ghanaian partner of eight years.

== Acting roles ==
=== Film ===
- Somewhere in the Darkness (1998)
- Your Move: An Emergency Life Saving Adventure (1997)
- Young Einstein (1988)
- Those Dear Departed (1987)
- Playing Beatie Bow (1986)
- Undercover (1984)
- Fatty Finn (1980)

=== Television ===
- The Mike Walsh Show (1980) Guest as herself
- E Street
- A Country Practice
- The Young Doctors as Bathsheba Smith (1981)
- Stock Squad

== Publications ==
- Cruickshank, Su, Bring A Plate to The Mortdale Scout Hall – The Autobiography of a Fat Tart Complete with Recipes, Sun Books, 1992, ISBN 0-7251-0677-8
