= Hembiträdet =

2004 novel by Marie Hermanson

- Author: Marie Hermanson
- Language: Swedish
- Published: 2004
- Publisher: Albert Bonniers
- Publication place: Sweden

Hembiträdet is a 2004 Marie Hermanson novel.

== Premise ==
Yvonne begins her employment as a housemaid for the Ekberg spouses, who lives in a single family house area.
