= Young Einstein =

1988 comedy Australian film by Yahoo Serious

- Theatrical release poster
- Directed by: Yahoo Serious
- Written by: David Roach; Yahoo Serious
- Produced by: David Roach; Warwick Ross; Yahoo Serious
- Starring: Yahoo Serious; Odile Le Clezio; John Howard
- Cinematography: Jeff Darling
- Edited by: David Roach; Amanda Robson; Neil Thumpston; Peter Whitmore
- Music by: Martin Armiger; William Motzing; Tommy Tycho
- Distributed by: Warner Bros. (through Greater Union Film Distributors)
- Release dates: 15 December 1988 (Australia); 4 August 1989 (United States)
- Running time: 91 minutes
- Country: Australia
- Language: English
- Budget: $5 million
- Box office: $24.9 million

Young Einstein is a 1988 Australian comedy film written, produced, directed by and starring Yahoo Serious. It is a fantasized account of the life of Albert Einstein which alters all people, places and circumstances of his life, including relocating the theoretical physicist to Australia, having him split the atom with a chisel, and inventing rock and roll and surfing. Although highly successful in Australia, and winning an award from the Australian Film Institute Awards, it was poorly received by critics in the United States. At the APRA Music Awards of 1990, the soundtrack won Most Performed Australasian Work for Film.

== Plot ==
Albert Einstein, the son of an apple farmer in Tasmania in the early 1900s, is interested in physics rather than the family business. His father shows him his grandfather's "laboratory", a remote shed where he made beer. His father tells him that they have tried for years to introduce bubbles to beer, saying that the person who can will change the world forever.

After heavy drinking, Einstein postulates the theory of mass–energy equivalence (E=MC^{2}) as a formula to split beer atoms to create bubbles in beer. After spending all night preparing, he splits a beer atom (with hammer and chisel), which causes the shed to explode. After Einstein excitedly shows his parents the formula and a glass of beer with bubbles in it, his father encourages him to head to the Australian mainland and patent the formula. On a train to Sydney, he meets Marie Curie, a Polish-French scientist studying at the University of Sydney, and Preston Preston, the pompous manager of the Sydney Patent Office. Marie is fascinated by Einstein, while Preston is annoyed by him.

In Sydney, Einstein lodges in a whorehouse and finds that the patent office will not accept scientific theories. Einstein leaves and meets Marie at the university, only to upset her professor by erasing his work and writing his own theory. Though he is thrown out, Marie becomes more taken with him. Preston attempts to woo Marie with his upper-class lifestyle. During a performance at a social club, she mentions her interest in Einstein's theory. Jealous, Preston has his clerk call Einstein in to take his formula for safe keeping. Preston turns the formula over to the Bavarian Brothers, a pair of brewmasters who intend to use the formula to get rich.

As Einstein invents rock and roll and the electric violin, he begins a romance with Marie. While at a beach, he demonstrates surfing for her. As they leave, Marie wishes the moment could last forever. Inspired, Einstein comes up with the theory of relativity on the spot, amazing Marie. As they return to the hotel, the clerk tells him that Preston is creating a keg using his formula. When Einstein protests, the Bavarian Brothers claim that Einstein is insane and have him committed. Einstein's electric violin is destroyed, and he is kept isolated. Marie confronts Preston, who says Einstein would have done nothing with his work and he is trying to help people.

Marie infiltrates the institution as Einstein's father confronts Einstein in the shower room, and reveals Preston's plot. When Einstein expresses helplessness, Marie leaves disappointed. Einstein rebuilds his violin into an electric guitar, uses it to short out the security system, and escapes. Upon finding she has returned to France, Einstein sails a small steamboat to France and wins her back by promising to stop Preston. They use the Curie family hot air balloon and head to the Nobel ceremony in Paris that night, attended by many inventors and scientific luminaries.

Charles Darwin announces Preston is the winner of this year's Nobel Prize for his beer bubble discovery. Einstein interrupts Preston's speech and questions if Preston knows what happens when an atom is split. When Darwin realizes that Preston has unknowingly built an atomic bomb, he orders Preston to stop. Preston scoffs at the warning and starts the keg, which starts shaking and building up pressure. Einstein attaches his guitar to the keg to drain it despite Marie's warning that this will kill him. Einstein plays a guitar riff, which causes the keg to lose power. Preston attempts to kill Einstein, but Marie knocks him unconscious. Einstein radiates pure energy, which causes a massive feedback, then an explosion.

As the smoke clears, Einstein is revealed to be unharmed. He and Marie kiss as the assembled crowd cheers while Preston had been escorted out and committed. He returns to Tasmania with the keg and the Nobel Prize. He tells his family that he will give his formula to the world instead of keeping it for personal gain. Marie questions what will happen if governments use that formula to create atomic weapons. Einstein naively expresses his trust in the governments of the world, announces he has learned a new theory, and then plays a rock and roll song.

== Cast ==
- Yahoo Serious as Albert Einstein
- Odile Le Clezio as Marie Curie
- John Howard as Preston Preston
- Ian "Peewee" Wilson as Mr. Einstein
- Su Cruickshank as Mrs. Einstein
- Lulu Pinkus as The Blonde
- Kaarin Fairfax as The Brunette
- Jonathan Coleman as Wolfgang Bavarian
- Basil Clarke as Charles Darwin
- Steve Abbott as Brian Asprin
- Esben Storm as Wilbur Wright
- Georgie Parker as Country girl fan

== Production ==
Serious first became interested in Albert Einstein when he was travelling down the Amazon River and saw a local wearing a T-shirt with a picture of a physicist on it. The image was that of Einstein sticking out his tongue, taken by photographer Arthur Sasse.

On returning from the Amazon, Serious adapted a previous screenplay called The Great Galute which he had written with David Roach. It was a story about an Australian who invents rock and roll. The two developed The Great Galute into Young Einstein.

The film was created on an extremely low budget, so low that Serious sold his car to generate funds, cameras were borrowed, and his mother cooked for the crew.

Serious managed to get Australian Film Commission support for the movie. By March 1984, an hour of the film had been shot, partly by the AFC and partly by private investment. Serious was then able to pre-sell the film to an American company, Film Accord, for $2 million. This enabled him to raise the film's original budget of $2.2 million. The movie started filming again late in 1985 and went for seven weeks, from 23 September, taking place in Newcastle and Wollombi, near Cessnock in the Hunter Valley, with the second unit at various locations throughout Australia. A 91-minute version of the film was entered in the 1986 AFI Awards where composer William Motzing won Best Music.

In 1986, Film Accord sued the production to recover its distribution guarantee and the rushes, claiming the film delivered was not the one it had contracted to buy. The dispute was settled out of court.

Serious was unhappy with his first version of the film. Graham Burke from Roadshow saw it and became enthusiastic about its possibilities. Roadshow bought out Film Accord in March 1987, persuaded Warner Bros. to take on the film for international distribution outside Australia, and financed re-shooting, re-editing and re-scoring, resulting in an hour of new material which included a new ending and new music score which included the addition of songs by artists such as Paul Kelly, Icehouse and Mental As Anything. This pushed the budget of the film up to $5 million. Warner Bros. contributed A$4 million to the full version of the film, and would go on to spend $8 million on marketing the film in the United States alone.

Serious's key collaborators in the movie were co-writer David Roach, co-producer Warwick Rodd and associate producer Lulu Pinkus. He has said it helped that they all shared the same vision for the movie which got them through the long production process.

Serious refused to consider making a sequel to the film, as he stated in interviews that he was opposed to them in general.

== Reception ==
=== Critical response ===
The film received negative reviews in the United States, with Spin describing the release as a "marketing misfire" due to Warner Bros.' "PR department's penchant for overkill". Roger Ebert called it a "one-joke movie, and I didn't laugh much the first time." He theorized that the lack of appeal to American audiences was because the film's comedy taps "the vast and inexhaustible fascination the Australians have about their own isolation and gawky charm. But the jokes don't travel very well." He gave the film one star out of a possible four. On their television show, Ebert's colleague Gene Siskel said he "didn't laugh once" during the film and named it one of the worst pictures of 1989. The Washington Post was also unimpressed: Rita Kempley called the film "dumber-than-a-bowling-ball" and questioned its mass appeal; Desson Howe noted that distributor Warner Bros. had made it a "pre-processed legend" regardless of merit. The New York Times was more tempered, noting that though the film was "an uneven series of sketches strung along an extended joke", that the first time director Serious "is a much more adept film maker than his loony plot suggests."

The Los Angeles Times gave a favorable review, saying the film would appeal to younger audiences and that "it's just about impossible to dislike a movie in which examples of the hero's pacifism include his risking his life to save kitties from being baked to death inside a pie." Neil Jillett of Australia's The Age reviewed the film positively, noting that despite some "directorial slackness", the film was "a lively work that is sophisticated and innocent, witty and farcical, satirical and unmalicious, intelligent but not condescending, full of concern with big issues but not arrogantly didactic, thoroughly Australian but not nationalistic." Variety meanwhile thought that the film relied on the performance of Yahoo Serious, who they described "exhibits a brash and confident sense of humor, endearing personality, and a fondness for sight gags." Although giving it a low rating, Leonard Maltin stated, "any movie with 'cat pies' can't be all bad".

In the UK, William Russell for the Glasgow Herald described the film as "trying too hard to be funny for its own good." Rotten Tomatoes gives the film a 36% rating based on reviews from 33 critics. The website's consensus reads: "Young Einstein suggests Yahoo Serious could be an effective leading man in the right comedic setting -- but this disappointingly uneven outing isn't it."

=== Box office ===
Young Einstein grossed A$13,383,377 at the box office in Australia. On release in Australia, it became the fifth biggest opening in Australian film history behind "Crocodile" Dundee, "Crocodile" Dundee II, Rocky IV, and Fatal Attraction. It grossed A$1.26 million in the opening weekend, despite being released in only three states. It was only the third film of 1988 to exceed the A$1 million mark at the Australian box office. Young Einstein became the tenth most successful film released at the Australian box office, after being the second most successful Australian film ever on release after "Crocodile" Dundee.

In the United States, it debuted at No. 8 on opening weekend. US distributor Warner Bros., hoping for similar crossover success as "Crocodile" Dundee, spent US$8 million on a major marketing push. It continues to be regarded as a flop. It did, however, end its US theatrical run at a slightly profitable $11,536,599.

The film has been released on DVD in region 1. The DVD is available in Australia by LA Entertainment.

== Soundtrack ==
Young Einstein (A Serious Motion Picture Soundtrack)

Soundtrack album by various artists
- Released: December 1988
- Label: Mushroom Records

Singles from Young Einstein (A Serious Motion Picture Soundtrack)
- 1. "Rock And Roll Music" Released: November 1988; 2. "The Music Goes 'Round My Head" Released: November 1988; 3. "Dumb Things" Released: January 1989

=== Track listing ===
No.	Title	Writer(s)	Length
1.	"Roll and Rock Music" (by Yahoo Serious)	Yahoo Serious; Ludwig van Beethoven; W. Mötzing	0:28
2.	"Rock and Roll Music" (by Mental As Anything)	Chuck Berry	3:00
3.	"The Music Goes 'Round My Head" (by The Saints)	Harry Vanda; George Young	3:44
4.	"Who Can You Trust (Main Theme)" (by Yahoo Serious and Lulu)	Serious; Mötzing	0:29
5.	"Dumb Things" (by Paul Kelly and the Coloured Girls)	Paul Kelly	2:42
6.	"Hungry Town" (by Big Pig)	Big Pig	3:04
7.	"Great Southern Land" (by Icehouse)	Iva Davies	5:10
8.	"Great Big Brain" (by The Song Company)	Serious; David Roach; George Frideric Handel; Mötzing	0:35
9.	"The Tasmanian" (by Yahoo Serious)	Serious	0:07
10.	"I Hear Motion" (by The Models)	The Models	3:32
11.	"Theory of Relativity" (by Yahoo Serious)	Serious; Martin Armiger	1:14
12.	"At First Sight" (by The Stems)	Dom Mariani	4:01
13.	"A Fist Full of Scientists" (by Ennio Morricone)	The Good, the Bad and the Ugly; Morricone	1:18
14.	"Weirdo Libido" (by Lime Spiders)	Mick Blood; Mathier	3:39
15.	"Young Einstein Pacifist" (by Yahoo Serious)	Serious; Mötzing	2:11

=== Charts ===
Weekly chart performance for Young Einstein
Chart (1989)	Peak position
Australian Albums (ARIA)	6

Year-end chart performance for Young Einstein
Chart (1989)	Position
Australian Albums (ARIA)	43

=== Certifications ===
Region	Certification	Certified units/sales
Australia (ARIA)	Platinum	70,000^{^}
^{^} Shipments figures based on certification alone.

== Awards ==
Organization	Award category	Result
Australian Film Institute Awards	Best Cinematography	Nominated
Australian Film Institute Awards	Best Original Music Score	Won
Australian Film Institute Awards	Best Original Screenplay	Nominated
Australian Film Institute Awards	Best Sound	Nominated
