= Lulu Pinkus =

Australian actress and screenwriter

- Other name: Lulu Serious
- Occupations: Stage, film and television actress
- Years active: 1975–1983; 1993, 2000
- Spouse: Yahoo Serious (m. 1989–2007)

Lulu Pinkus is an Australian screenwriter, producer, stage, film and television actress. She made appearances on numerous television crime and police dramas during the 1970s and early 80s, including a nine-episode stint on Prisoner, as well as supporting roles in a number of feature films. She was also the wife of Yahoo Serious and has been involved in producing all of his films: Young Einstein, Reckless Kelly and Mr. Accident. Pinkus is also an accomplished artist, having been featured in several art exhibitions.

== Career ==
Pinkus made her television acting debut in 1975 with guest spots on Division 4 and Homicide, making a second appearance on the latter series a year later. She also appeared in the television miniseries Against the Wind, Cop Shop and Chopper Squad in 1978. She also performed with the Australian Performing Group at the Pram Factory and as part of the Hoopla Foundation's reading of the play Freaks in 1978. She performed in a Melbourne production of Snoo Wilson's The Everest Hotel alongside Jillian Archer and Helen Hemingway in June of the same year. Following this came her first major role, a storyline spanning 11 episodes (of which she appears in 9) in the cult soap opera Prisoner playing Melinda Cross. Melinda, a university friend of Karen Travers (Peta Toppano), is arrested when she attempts to blackmail a married university lecturer with whom she had been having an affair.

She made her feature film debut that same year in the post-apocalyptic film Mad Max (1979), one of several Prisoner cast members to appear in the film. Her brief role was as the Nightrider's punky girlfriend. She also had supporting roles in the thrillers Thirst (1979) and Snapshot (1979). She continued working in television starring in the miniseries The Last Outlaw (1980), the television movie Intimate Strangers (1981) and guest starred on Bellamy and A Country Practice between 1981 and 1982. Her last role was in the film A Slice of Life (1983).

She was the associate producer of Young Einstein (1988), in which she made a cameo appearance, and married Yahoo Serious on 22 January 1989. Following her marriage to Serious, she became involved in all his later film projects. She wrote and co-produced, as Lulu Serious, Reckless Kelly (1993) and Mr. Accident (2000). She was also the film's music coordinator and casting director. In May 2007, it was reported that Pinkus and Serious had separated. In February 2008, she appeared at an art exhibition in New South Wales. Her collection was considered unconventional combining pop culture "with religious imagery & fairy tale motifs".

=== Film ===
Year	Title	Role	Type
1979	Mad Max	Nightrider's Girl	Feature film
1979	Snapshot (aka The Day After Halloween)	Wendy	Feature film
1979	Thirst	Nurse	Feature film
1982	A Slice of Life	Addy	Feature film
1988	Young Einstein	The Blonde	Feature film
1993	Reckless Kelly	Hollywood Supermarket Check-out	Feature film
2000	Mr. Accident	Rock Clip Chick (as Lulu Serious)	Feature film
2022	Three Thousand Years of Longing	Old Merchant Wife	Feature film

=== Television ===
Year	Title	Role	Type
1974	Matlock Police	Nurse	TV series, 1 episode
1974; 1975	Division 4	Shop Assistant / Ellen Swanson	TV series, 2 episodes
1975; 1976	Homicide	Chrissie / Robbie Meyer	TV series, 2 episodes
1978–1980	Cop Shop	Corrie Williams / Shirley Baker / Linda Hobbs / Felicity Browning / Heather Browning / Celia Denton	TV series, 11 episodes
1978	Chopper Squad	Kate	TV series, 1 episode
1978	Against The Wind	Jenny	TV miniseries, 2 episodes
1979	Patrol Boat	Chris	TV series, 1 episode
1979	Prisoner	Melinda Cross	TV series, 9 episodes
1980	The Last Outlaw	Helen	TV miniseries, 4 episodes
1980	Water Under the Bridge	Ann	TV miniseries, 1 episode
1981	Menotti		TV series, 1 episode
1981	Intimate Strangers	Dirk	TV miniseries, 2 episodes
1981	Bellamy	Maureen	TV series, episode 24: "Jodie's Story"
1981; 1982	Holiday Island	Linda Cross / Kim Mason	TV series, 2 episodes
1982	A Country Practice	Tracy	TV series, 2 episodes
