= Mr. Accident =

- Theatrical release poster
- Directed by: Yahoo Serious
- Written by: Yahoo Serious; David Roach
- Produced by: Yahoo Serious; Warwick Ross; Lulu Serious; Dennis Kiely
- Starring: Yahoo Serious; Helen Dallimore; David Field; Garry McDonald
- Cinematography: Steve Arnold
- Edited by: Simon Martin
- Music by: Nerida Tyson-Chew
- Production companies: United Artists; Carlotta Films
- Distributed by: Roadshow Film Distributors
- Release date: 24 March 2000
- Running time: 89 minutes
- Country: Australia
- Language: English
- Budget: <$10 million
- Box office: $1.6 million

Mr. Accident is a 2000 Australian comedy film written, directed, produced by, and starring Yahoo Serious. It was filmed in September and October 1998 in Sydney.

== Plot ==
Roger Crumpkin is an accident-prone young man who works as a maintenance fitter at the Big Egg Factory, which bears an uncanny resemblance to the Sydney Opera House. One day, Roger and his friend Lyndon go to a club, where the bartender offers Roger a cigarette, which he smokes, triggering a massive nicotine addiction.

Crumpkin lives in an upper apartment in a high rise building, "The Future", overlooking the Sydney Harbour Bridge. He meets Sunday Valentine, a chicken sexer from the egg company, who had read her keytag upside-down and enters his apartment by mistake. When hanging out his washing on the Hills hoist on the roof, he meets her again; she uses the area for her observatory, searching for extra-terrestrial intelligence. A mutual attraction develops.

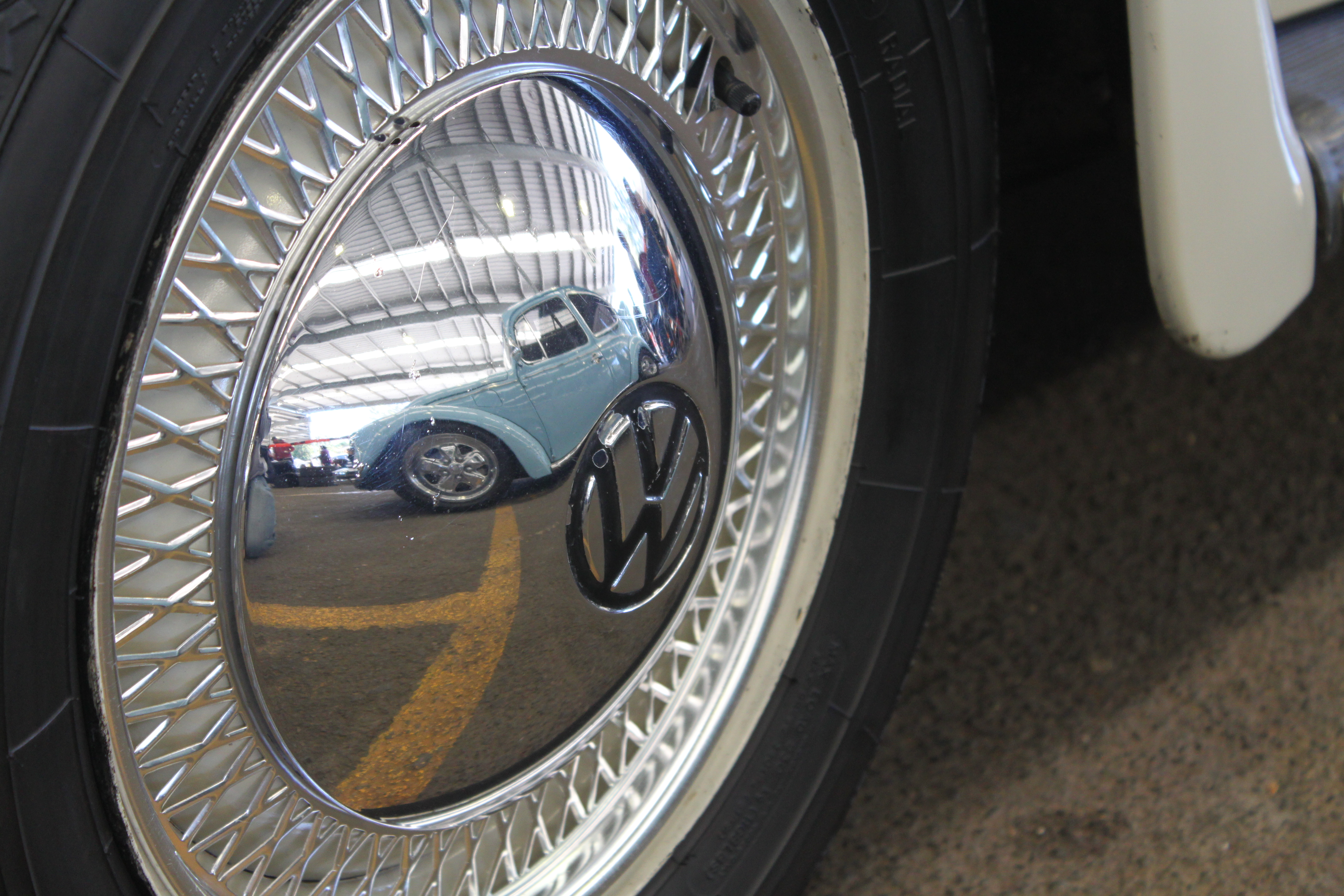
VW hubcap

After a series of mishaps of his own making, Crumpkin drives through a barrier and into a deep excavation. He and Lyndon crawl from the wreckage and find, embedded in an ancient stratum, a metal object resembling a hubcap from a Volkswagen Beetle. Back at his apartment, he finds it has properties beyond those of ordinary metals: it can't be dented, and absorbs heat without getting hot. He steps outside his room: it is rubbish collection day, and bins are out by the stair on every level. He trips and initiates an avalanche of rubbish which gathers all the way down to ground floor. Crumpkin gets knocked through the window while saving a baby — his fall is broken numerous times on the way down, so survives in time to be buried under the garbage that pours out the entrance.

He shows the hubcap to Sunday, and convinces her that it belongs to a UFO and conclude it belongs to a mother ship that crashed millions of years ago. They return to the excavation with a metal detector. Under the dirt they find a big, metal object. They pull it out, only find an ordinary car, a VW Beetle, and Sunday loses her faith in him. To restore her trust, Crumpkin takes Sunday to dinner at Mummies, an up-market Egyptian-themed restaurant but after a series of accidents they are forced to leave. As a final insult, Crumpkin accidentally sprays Sunday with sump oil; she storms off. Crumpkin's evil boss, Duxton, arrives on the scene. He has a lust for Sunday but is unaware of Crumpkin's involvement. They share a cigarette.

Crumpkin finds his craving for nicotine is assuaged by eating eggs, and unintentionally kills Barry, his goldfish with a morsel of boiled egg. Back at the egg factory, Duxton boasts of how he is flooding the market with nicotine-laced eggs, and how he took over the business from his nicer brother Kelvin by trapping him in a fridge and crushing him. He then forces Crumpkin and Lyndon into a two-door fridge for a similar fate, and drives it to a recycling plant, but they escape unnoticed. Duxton drives off with Sunday, while Crumpkin gives chase. He is injured but reconciles with Sunday, and tells her about Duxton's plot.

Crumpkin and Sunday flee to the apartment, where Duxton confronts them, and tries to trap them in the room's fridge. Crumpkin fights back but Sunday is trapped. Duxton cuts the cable, all that is preventing the fridge from falling headlong. Audrey, the Jack Russell Terrier dog, catches the cable and Crumpkin pulls Sunday back up. Duxton falls head first down the stairwell and is no more. Sunday decides to leave town, but before she can catch the bus Crumpkin returns her music box, which he has repaired. They kiss and make up. Meanwhile the hubcap, which has served as a dog's bowl, levitates out of the window and somewhere in space reattaches to the landing gear of a UFO, which retracts its undercarriage and flies away.

== Cast ==
- Yahoo Serious as Roger Crumpkin
- Helen Dallimore as Sunday Valentine
- David Field as Duxton Chevalier / Sir Walter Raleigh
- Garry McDonald as Kelvin Chevalier
- Grant Piro as Lyndon
- Lisbeth Gorr as Corporal Brigette (Sunday's flatmate)
- Paul Livingston as Enigmatic Stranger (in excavation)
- Lulu Pinkus as Rock Clip Chick
- Pippa Grandison as Nightclub Natasha
- Felix Williamson as Rats

== Soundtrack ==
- "Hot Hot Hot" (Cassell) Arrow
- "Welcome" (Rumour/Perkins) The Cruel Sea
- "Buster" (Spiderbait) Spiderbait
- "Mysterioso-so" (Haymes, Kelly, Raglus, Roberts) The Feeling Groovies
- "Godfather of Cool" (Tom Carlyon) Luxedo
- "Mambo UK" (Jesus Alemany) Cubanismo
- "Eggs Benedict'em" (Serious, Roach, Tyson-Chew) Victorian Philharmonic & Melbourne Chorale
- "Wall of Skank" (Haymes, Kelly, Raglus, Roberts) The Feeling Groovies
- "I'm In Love with My Car" (Reg Mombassa) Mental as Anything
- "Afrobras" (Alves) Luciano Alves
- "Theta State" (Cartright, Keiller) sonicanimation
- "Universally Lonely" (N. Tyson-Chew) Victorian Philharmonic
- "Moon River" (Mancini) Henry Mancini
- "Kid Indestructible (28 Days) 28 Days
- "Oh Dear! Oh No! Uh Oh! (Serious, Roach, Tyson-Chew) Victorian Philharmonic & Melbourne Chorale
- "Roger On Sunday" (N. Tyson Chew) Victorian Philharmonic

== Reception ==
Mr. Accident grossed $1,612,424 at the box office in Australia.

The film holds a 17% approval rating at Rotten Tomatoes, based on 6 reviews (5 negative, 1 positive).

== See also ==
- Cinema of Australia
