= Harald Geisler =

German artist

- Born: 1980 (age 45–46); Frankfurt am Main
- Education: Hochschule für Gestaltung Offenbach am Main
- Notable work: Sigmund Freud Typeface, Albert Einstein Font, Typographic Wall Calendar, Typographic Postcards Series

Harald Geisler is an artist known for his typographic projects about the role of writing in society. He was born 1980 in Frankfurt am Main, Germany and graduated in 2009 at the University of Art and Design Offenbach am Main.

In 2009 Geisler started creating typefaces and since then released 28 typefaces. With an emphasis on handwriting he developed a method to design fonts that focuses on movement rather than outlines. In 2013 while drawing a font based on Sigmund Freud's manuscripts he started to store multiple versions of each letter in the font instead of fixed ligatures, and created a technique called polyalphabetic substitution that would alter between multiple versions of each letter based on the surrounding letters. This means that when a typist types, the ligatures in each word change so that they are not overused, giving the writing a more realistic look. The technique was based on the rotating barrels of an Enigma encryption machine.

His work is controversially discussed among designers and aims to engage a wider audience in a discourse about typography. His projects are often financed through crowdfunding.

== Typefaces ==
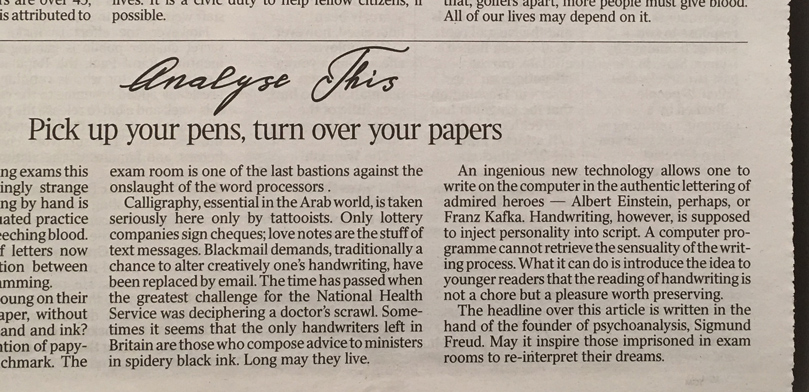
Sigmund Freud Font used in The Times of London

=== Sigmund Freud Typeface ===
The idea of the Sigmund Freud typeface is inspired by imagining a person writing a letter to his or hers shrink in Sigmund Freud's handwriting. It is based on eight handwritten documents from 1883 to 1938 selected from the archive of the Sigmund Freud Museum Vienna. in 2015 the font was used in the Times, replacing Times New Roman font in a headline of an article discussing the value of handwriting.

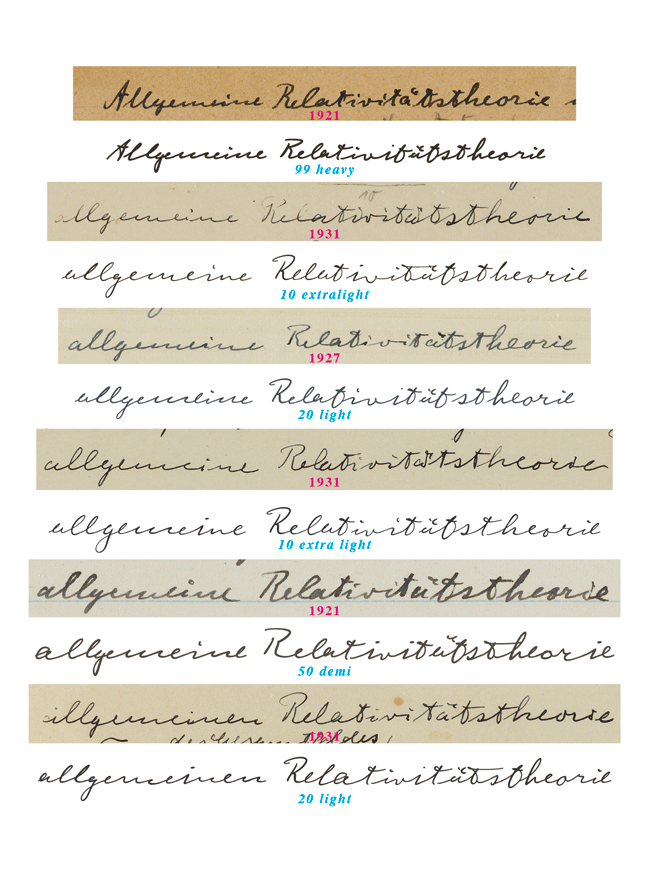
Samples of Albert Einstein's handwriting compared with the Albert Einstein Font.

=== Albert Einstein Font ===
The Albert Einstein Font is based on Albert Einstein's handwriting. The font holds five variations of each letter that are based on manuscripts from the Albert Einstein Archives in Jerusalem. The letters were recreated using a digital pen to reconstruct the original movement that was used to create them. The project was supported by the Albert Einstein Estate and the production of the font was funded through a Kickstarter Campaign supported by 2334 Backers.

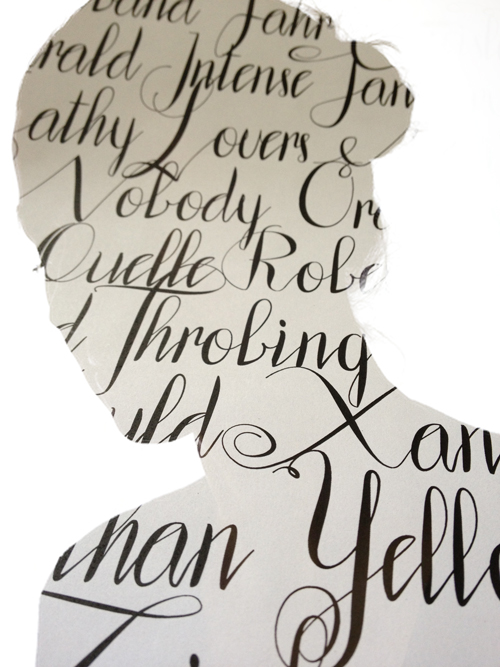
Conspired Lovers Font Specimen

=== Conspired Lovers ===
Conspired Lovers is based on Geisler's own handwriting. The design of the font is inspired by love-letter writing.

== Notable works ==
=== Pen-pals Project ===
The Pen-pals Project was a historic reenactment of the letter exchange between Albert Einstein and Sigmund Freud in 1932, discussing the possibility to "free mankind from the menace of war". In 2017, commemorating the 85th anniversary of the exchange, Geisler reproduced and send the letters from the same location and time of year. Supporters of the project on the crowdfunding platform Kickstarter received copies of the letters or addressed copies to politicians.

=== Typographic Wall Calendar ===
The Typographic Wall Calendar is a poster series about the notation of time. It is compiled of the number of used keyboard keys that enumerate the year, laid out in a grid and read from left to right. The first print of the series was produced in 2009.

=== Typographic Postcards ===
Started as a spin off from the Typographic Wall Calendar Series and since then produced 28 typographic cards based on the topic of writing.

== Publications ==
=== Designing Programmes ===
In collaboration with Karl Gerstner, Geisler created in 2007 an updated version of Gerstner's "Designing Programmes" form 1964.

== See also ==
Albert Einstein in popular culture#In typography
