= Symphony in the Domain =

Open-air concert, part of Sydney Festival

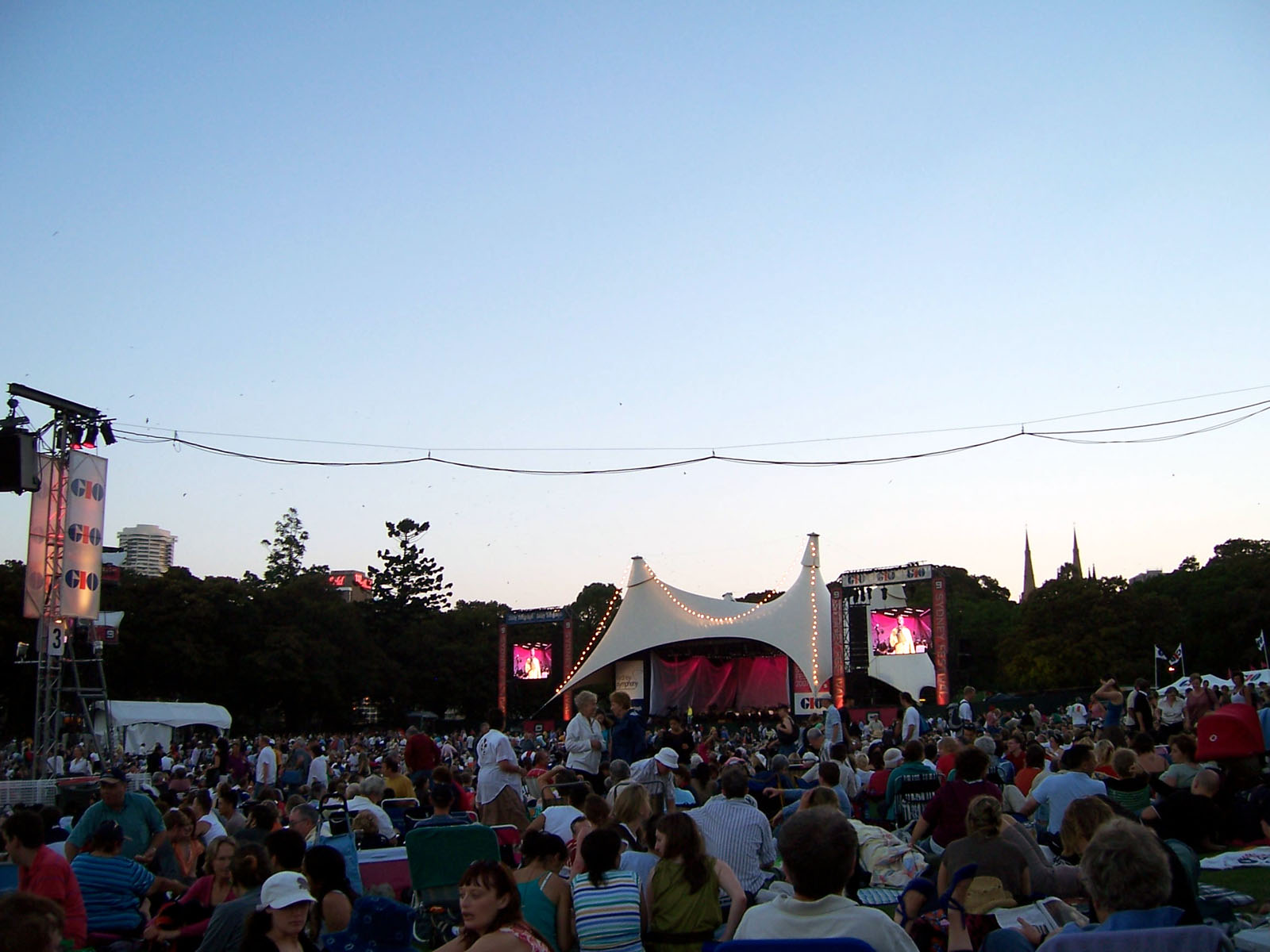
Symphony in The Domain

Symphony in The Domain (formerly known as Symphony Under the Stars) is the second of three open-air concerts that are held in The Domain, Sydney - Summer Sounds and Symphony, as part of Sydney Festival, and Mazda Opera in The Domain. Symphony in The Domain, performed by the Sydney Symphony, is traditionally held on the third Saturday evening of January. In 2014, the event was moved to the third Sunday, coinciding with Australia Day; in 2015, the event was also held on a Sunday. In 2007, the event celebrated its 25th anniversary, with a record crowd of 85,000 people.

It is preceded by Summer Sounds in The Domain (formally Jazz in The Domain) the previous Saturday, and followed by Opera in The Domain. All the concerts are free.

Symphony in The Domain presents a wide variety of classical music, most often including contemporary classical music by Australian composers.

The event is popular with both locals and tourists, and has become a celebrated part of Sydney Festival, as well as Sydney summer culture in general. Families make a night of it, many arriving with blankets and picnic banquets, making for a relaxed atmosphere. As with all the Domain concerts, Symphony in The Domain has a performance time of two and a half hours, although entertainment is provided for people who arrive early to secure vantage areas closer to the main stage. Classical music lovers have been known to camp overnight to mark their spots on the massive lawns of The Domain.

On some years, crowds are welcomed to the event by the Lord Mayor of Sydney, and the Premier of NSW. The concert always traditionally ends with Tchaikovsky's 1812 Overture, with the finale complemented by cannons, a fireworks display above The Domain, and with the bells of St Mary's Cathedral tolling in the background.
