= Kokoda Track Foundation =

Australia-based not-for-profit organisation

The Kokoda Track Foundation
- Type: Educational Charity
- Website: ktf.ngo

The Kokoda Track Foundation (KTF) is an international aid organisation working in Papua New Guinea. The foundation was established in 2003 and supports the indigenous people of that country. The Foundation provides education, health, equality and leadership programmes.

== History ==
The Kokoda Track Foundation is an Australian not-for-profit organisation that works with the communities living along and around the Kokoda Track in Papua New Guinea (PNG). Following its formation in 2003, the KTF funded and prepared a Strategic Plan for Tourism for the Kokoda Track. The Kokoda Track Foundation lobbied for, and on 11 June 2003, the PNG government established, the Kokoda Track Special Purpose Authority (KTA). The KTA's first action was the development of an ecotrekking strategy to enable the people along the track "to optimise the benefits from tourism and enable them to take a leading role in their own development". The Foundation initially started provided young children in PNG with school scholarships. Over the years, the Foundation increased its support to include other areas of health, education and welfare.

The Chairman of KTF is Ian Kemish and the CEO is Genevieve Nelson. Board members include Yahoo Serious and Bill James (co-founder of Flight Centre).

== In Papua New Guinea ==
The foundation currently works in four main areas: education, health, equality and leadership.
