= Marie Hermanson =

Swedish writer and journalist

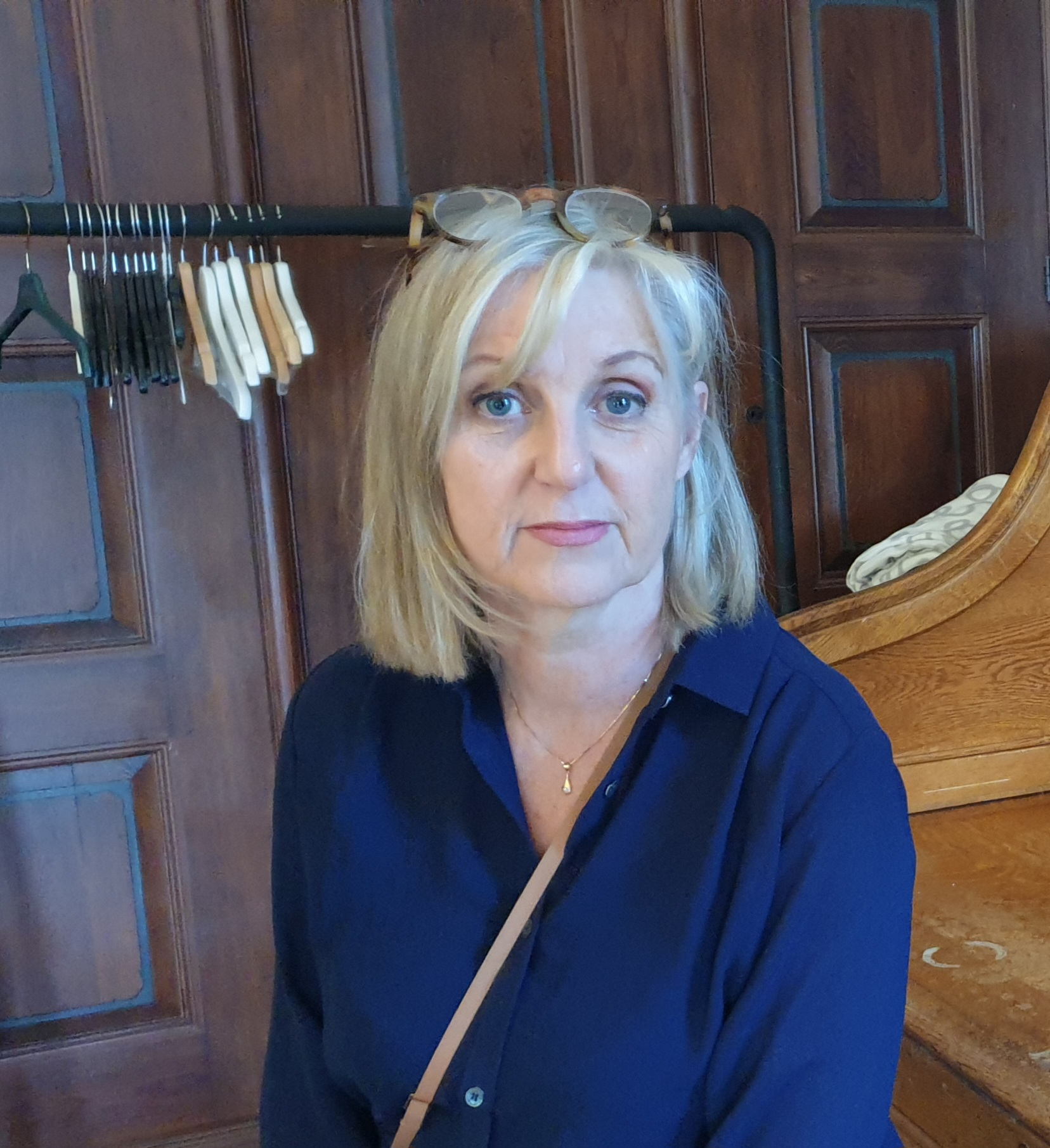
- Marie Hermanson (2024)
- Born: 1956 (age 69–70); Gothenburg, Sweden
- Occupations: journalist, writer
- Writing career
- Language: Swedish
- Period: 1986–

Marie Hermanson (born 1956) is a Swedish writer and journalist. Many of her novels evoke fairy tales and myths, characterized by her sensually realist style. The Devil's Sanctuary, her first novel to be translated into English, appeared in 2013.

== Biography ==
Born in Sävedalen, a suburb of Gothenburg, Hermanson attended the Gothenburg School of Journalism (Journalisthögskolan) before studying sociology and literature at University of Gothenburg. She then worked for various newspapers until 1986 when she published Det finns ett hål i verkligheten (There is a Hole in Reality), evoking fairy tales and myths. Her novel Snövit (1990) provides her own interpretation of Snow White while in Tvillingsystrana (The Twin Sisters, 1993), Värddjuret (The Parasite's Host, 1995) and Musselstranden (The Mussel Shore, 1998), she adds sensuality to the fairly tale genre, drawing on the renewed interest in realism characterizing Nordic literature in the late 20th century.

Himmelsdalen (2011), her first novel to be translated into English, appeared as The Devil's Sanctuary in 2013. The thriller tells the story of estranged twin brothers who meet at an Alpine clinic.

== Bibliography ==
- Det finns ett hål i verkligheten, 1986
- Snövit, 1990
- Tvillingsystrarna, 1993
- Värddjuret, 1995
- Musselstranden, 1998
- Ett oskrivet blad, 2001
- Hembiträdet, 2004
- Mannen under trappan, 2005
- Svampkungens son, 2007
- Himmelsdalen, 2011, translated as The Devil's Sanctuary, 2013
- Skymningslandet, 2014
- Den stora utställningen, 2018
- Pestön, 2021

== Awards ==
- Partille Bookstore's Writer's Scholarship −1997
- Bokhandelns val – 2005

=== Nominations ===
August Prize – 1995 (for Värddjuret).
