= Louis Hirshman =

American caricaturist

Lou Hirshman
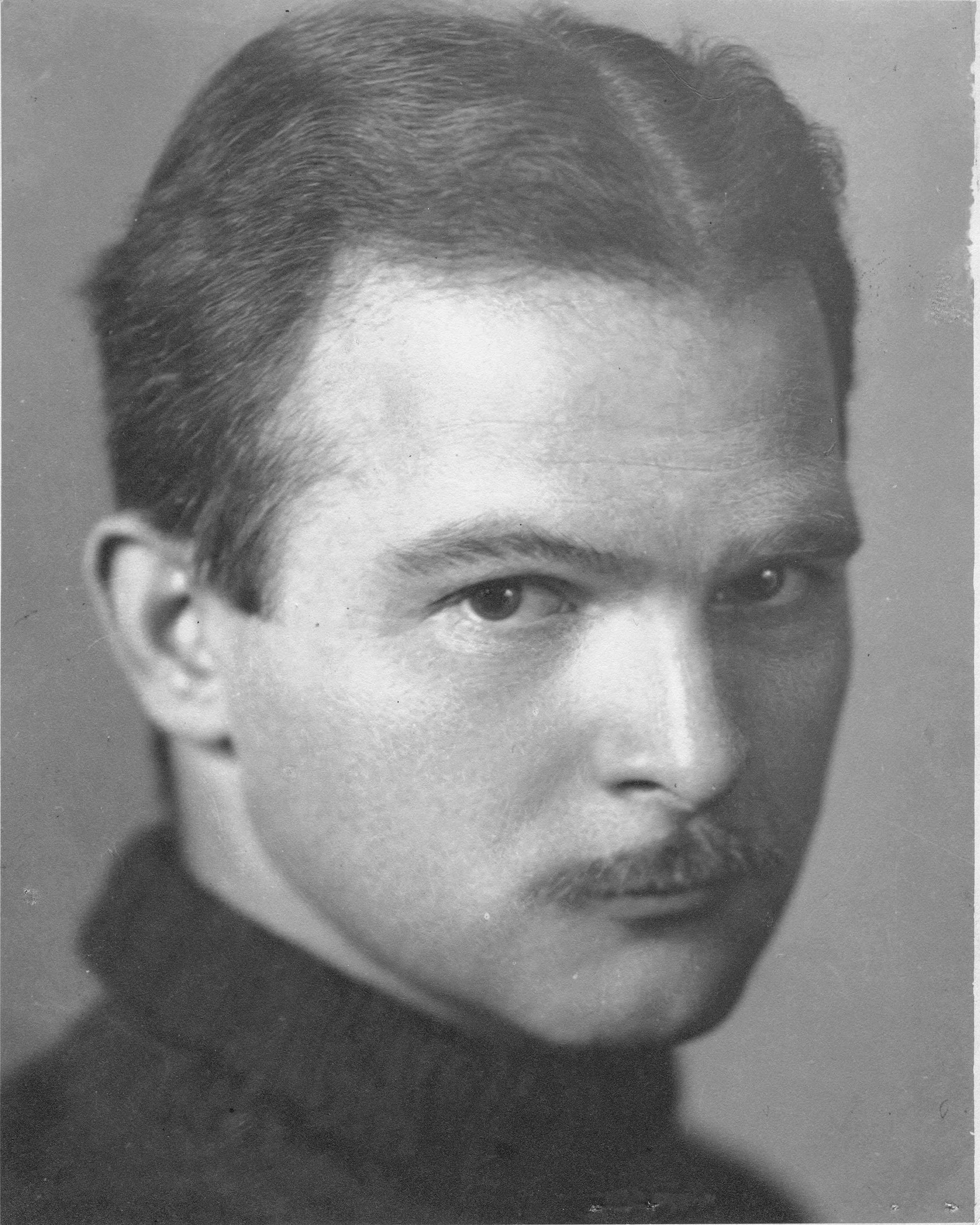
- Lou Hirshman as a young man
- Born: 1905; Ukraine
- Died: 1986 (aged 80–81); Philadelphia, Pennsylvania

Louis "Lou" Hirshman (1905–1986) was an American artist known for his witty and imaginative use of found objects for caricatures of celebrities and politicians, and in later years for scenes of everyday life.

Unlike sketched or painted two-dimensional caricatures, these collages, known as constructions, are reliefs on glass-covered, framed flat boards created using common items and discarded junk, a genre that Bostonia magazine once dubbed the "Out-of-the-Ashcan School." His creations exaggerated the icons of his day, such as Adolf Hitler, Groucho Marx, John F. Kennedy, and Fidel Castro, depicting them with gloves, spools of thread, peanut shells, and chains.

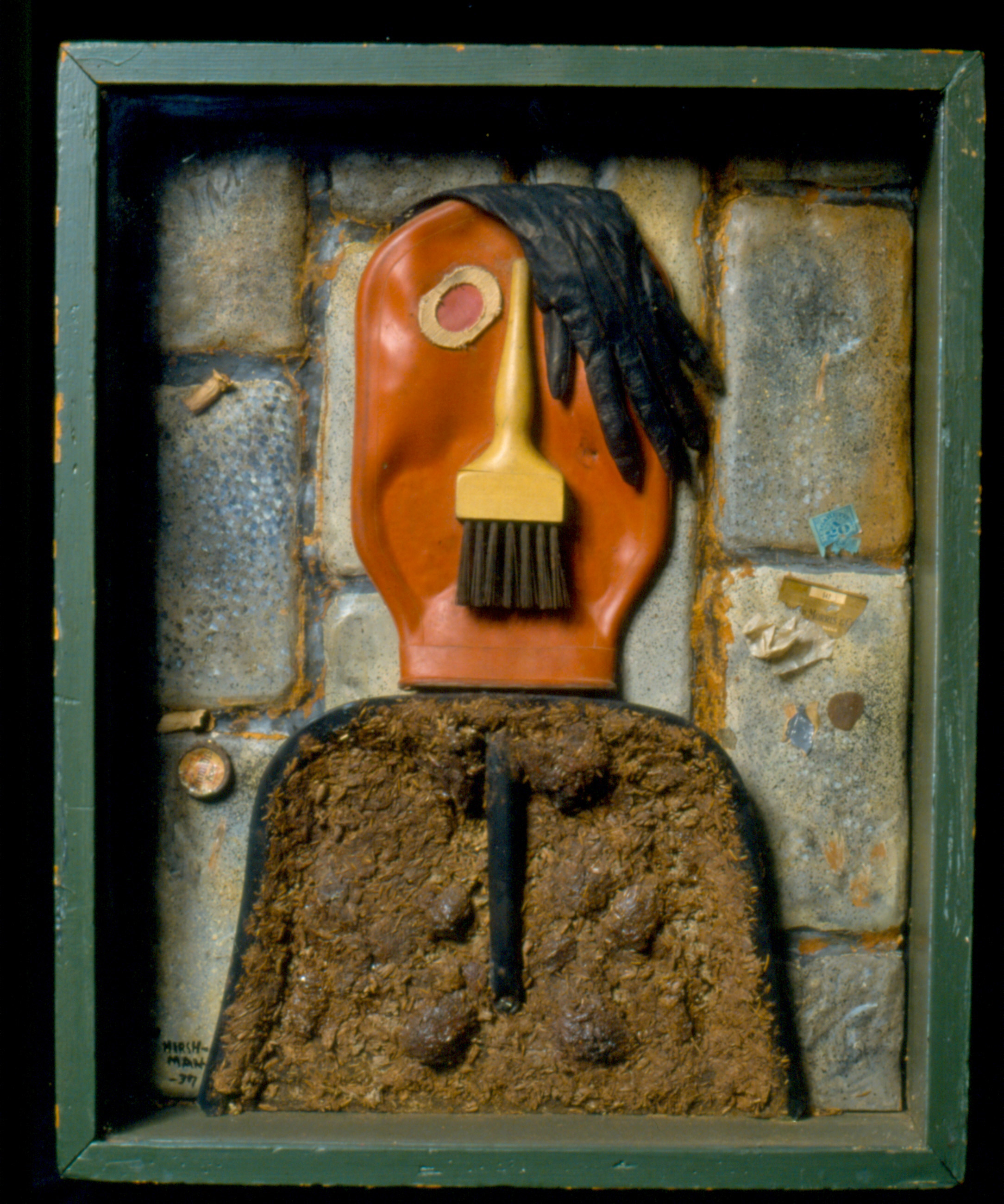
Adolf Hitler by Lou Hirshman - 1937

Hirshman's most famous artwork was arguably his 1940 representation of Albert Einstein, with the mathematician sporting a wild mop of hair, an abacus chest and shirt collar scribbled with the equation 2+2 = 2+2. In 1977, the piece was purchased by the Philadelphia Museum of Art.

Although his pieces often engendered laughter as viewers recognized the parts of familiar items that informed the subject as a whole, Hirshman – as well as colleagues—considered these representations serious works of art. In his last period, he shifted into caricaturizing scenes of everyday life and archetypes, all with his clever mix of found objects.

== Birth and early life ==
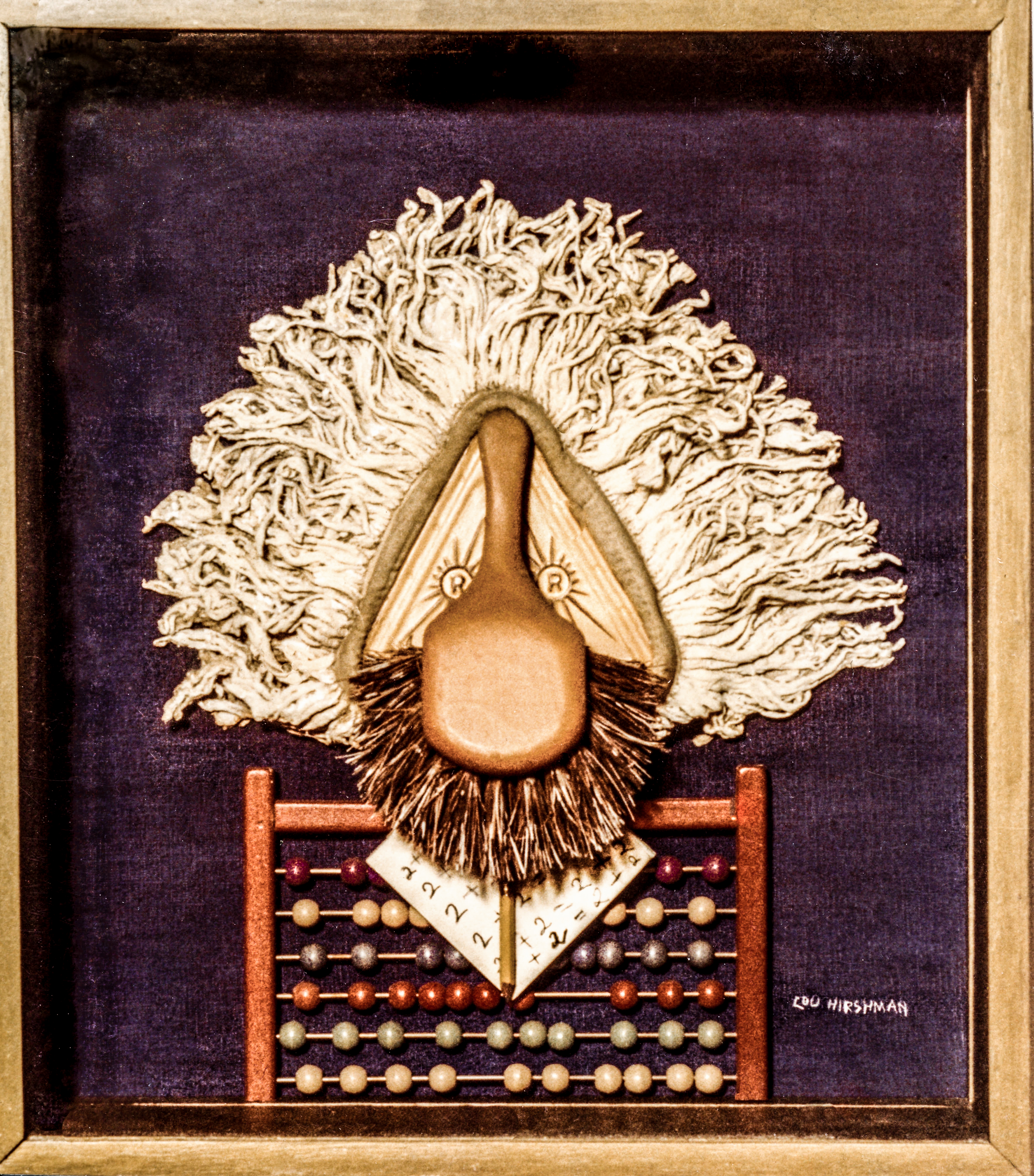
Albert Einstein by Louis Hirshman - 1940

Hirshman was born in 1905 in western Russia, now part of Ukraine, to Jewish parents. Trying to escape hard times, his mother and father decided to take their nine children to the United States. After his father, along with several of Hirshman's older siblings, emigrated to Philadelphia, Pennsylvania, he found work in a sweatshop, saving enough money to reunite the family. In 1909, four-year-old Louis, the second youngest in the family, sailed to the U.S. through Ellis Island with his mother and the remaining siblings to join his father. From that point on, except for a stint in the U.S. Army during World War II, he lived his entire life in Philadelphia.

As a child of a poor family, Hirshman claimed he would sometimes ease his pangs of hunger by drawing pictures of food, a skill that became useful for his later artworks that often contained what appeared to be perishables, such as bananas and spiders, but were actually created in his studio.

== Training in art and brief career in filmmaking ==
Hirshman left school at the end of 10th grade and started doing art professionally in 1920. Little is known about his artistic activities during the decade, however, The Philadelphia Inquirer stated that at some point Hirshman received a grant from the Barnes Foundation, an art institute in Philadelphia, to study art in Paris as well as in Italy. He also attended the Pennsylvania Academy of the Fine Arts in Philadelphia. A lover of movies, the Marx Brothers and Charlie Chaplin would later become subjects of his witty constructions. Hirshman co-founded the avant-garde Cinema Crafters of Philadelphia in 1928. In 1930, Hirshman, taking on the nom de plume of Hershell Louis, and several colleagues made the experimental film Story of a Nobody, in which the camera takes the subjective view of an invisible protagonist. It has since been hailed as one of the first examples of avant-garde filmmaking in the US. The only copy, archived at the Museum of Modern Art in New York, deteriorated and was discarded in 1956.

In the mid-1930s, Hirshman joined the Graphic Sketch Club, an art school in Philadelphia for local artists. While Hirshman had been doing oil paintings, he shifted toward drawing caricatures. In 1938, a premier ballerina, Catherine Littlefield, incensed by an unflattering caricature, entered Hirshman's studio, slapped him on the cheek and tore up the drawing.

== New kind of caricature ==
Hirshman had already been experimenting with his constructions. His first major piece was in 1935, a biting caricature of the rich business magnate, John D. Rockefeller, the co-founder Standard Oil (coat and cap of crushed rock and a silver dime for an eye). By 1938, with an increased portfolio, Hirshman was approached by Look magazine. The popular weekly journal ran a two-page, black-and-white spread featuring four of his pieces: Adolf Hitler with a house painter's brush for nose and mustache (Hitler was rumored to be a house painter) and a dustpan of manure for the shirt, Harpo Marx with tomatoes for hair, Italian dictator Benito Mussolini with a toilet plunger for a scowling mouth, the Duchess and Duke of Windsor, the well-off American divorcee Wallis Simpson with a pocketbook face, and milquetoast-timid former King Edward VIII with a slice-of-toast head and sunny-side-up egg eye. His work also appeared in several other publications, including Vanity Fair. In May 2015, the New York-based Society of Illustrators hosted a lecture on forgotten caricaturists, which highlighted Hirshman's work.

== Jobs and wartime ==
Married in 1939, the following year Hirshman began working at a commercial artist studio doing portraits, murals, cartoons and landscapes, as well as painting designs on plates. As World War II raged, he also created posters for the Works Project Administration (WPA), a federal program started during the Great Depression, as part of the Federal Art Project. In 1943, Hirshman went into the U.S. Army and was stationed in Texas, largely doing graphics duties, such as training aids.

== Teaching career ==
After his discharge in 1946, Hirshman moved back to Philadelphia, eventually joining the faculty at the highly respected Samuel S. Fleisher Art Memorial, a free art school with evening and Saturday classes (now administered by the Philadelphia Museum of Art). He was appointed faculty director in 1960, serving until his retirement in 1977.

There are very few known pieces created by Hirshman from 1950 through 1961. But in 1962, he produced Tap Dancer, his first construction featuring an archetype rather than a public figure. Hirshman still occasionally did caricatures of politicians, including pre-assassination President John F. Kennedy with a coconut forelock of hair (Hirshman put the piece in storage for many years after Kennedy's death), USSR leader Nikita Khrushchev with a potato nose and garlic clove teeth, and Cuban leader Fidel Castro with a beard of chain and a doughnut mouth holding a hotdog Havana. His last caricature of a public figure was a 1964 portrayal of a rat-like French President Charles de Gaulle in profile with the foot part a large upside-down sock representing his large proboscis.

== Shift in subject matter ==
During this transition period, Hirshman began using his found objects to mimic the world he saw around him (and the world in his head), a shift in direction that was to last until the end of his life. Largely unknown, this large collection of collages reveal an artist finding caricature, both humorous and serious, in a vase of flowers (Still Life), animals (Elephant and The Hunt), loneliness (Brooding Young Girl), and dozens of other motifs. Anything could be anything – handcuffs as glasses (The Psychiatrist), tin can lids for tree leaves (The Storm), a pair children's scissors as crossed swords (The Duel), or halved peach pits for breasts (Topless Waitress).

== Death ==
Hirshman died on July 26, 1986, at his home in Philadelphia. According to The Philadelphia Inquirer, an unfinished construction was still on his easel.
