= Arthur Sasse =

American photographer (1899–1991)

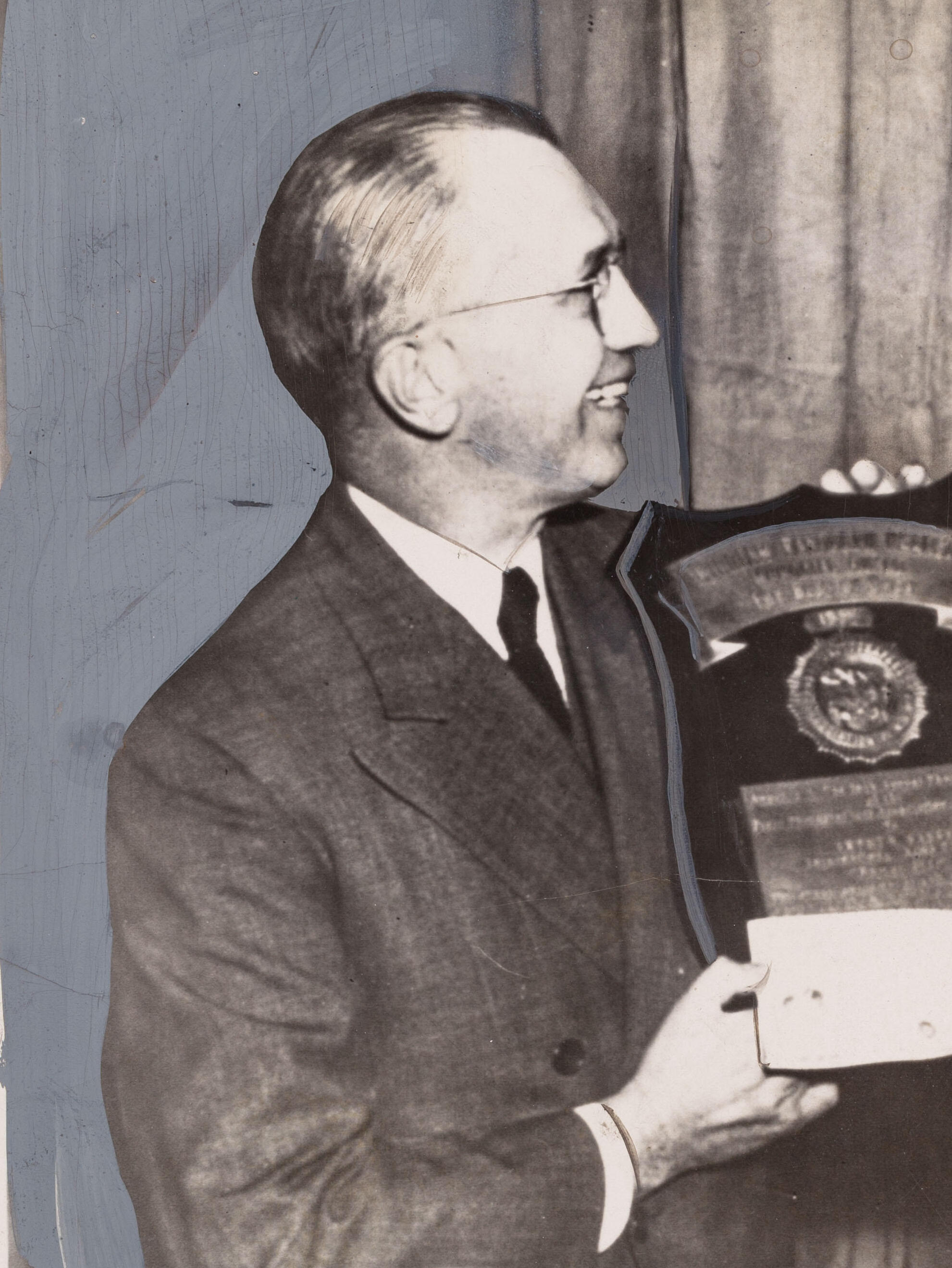
Sasse in 1952

Arthur Hjalmar Sasse (January 20, 1899 – October 3, 1991) was an American UPI photographer. In 1948, his pictures were exhibited at a show at the Bronx Zoo. He is best known for his photo of Albert Einstein sticking his tongue out.

== Biography ==
Arthur Sasse was born in Manhattan, New York. Before the age of 20, he was working as a photographer for Bronx Home News, and by 1942 he was working for International News Photo.

== Einstein photo ==
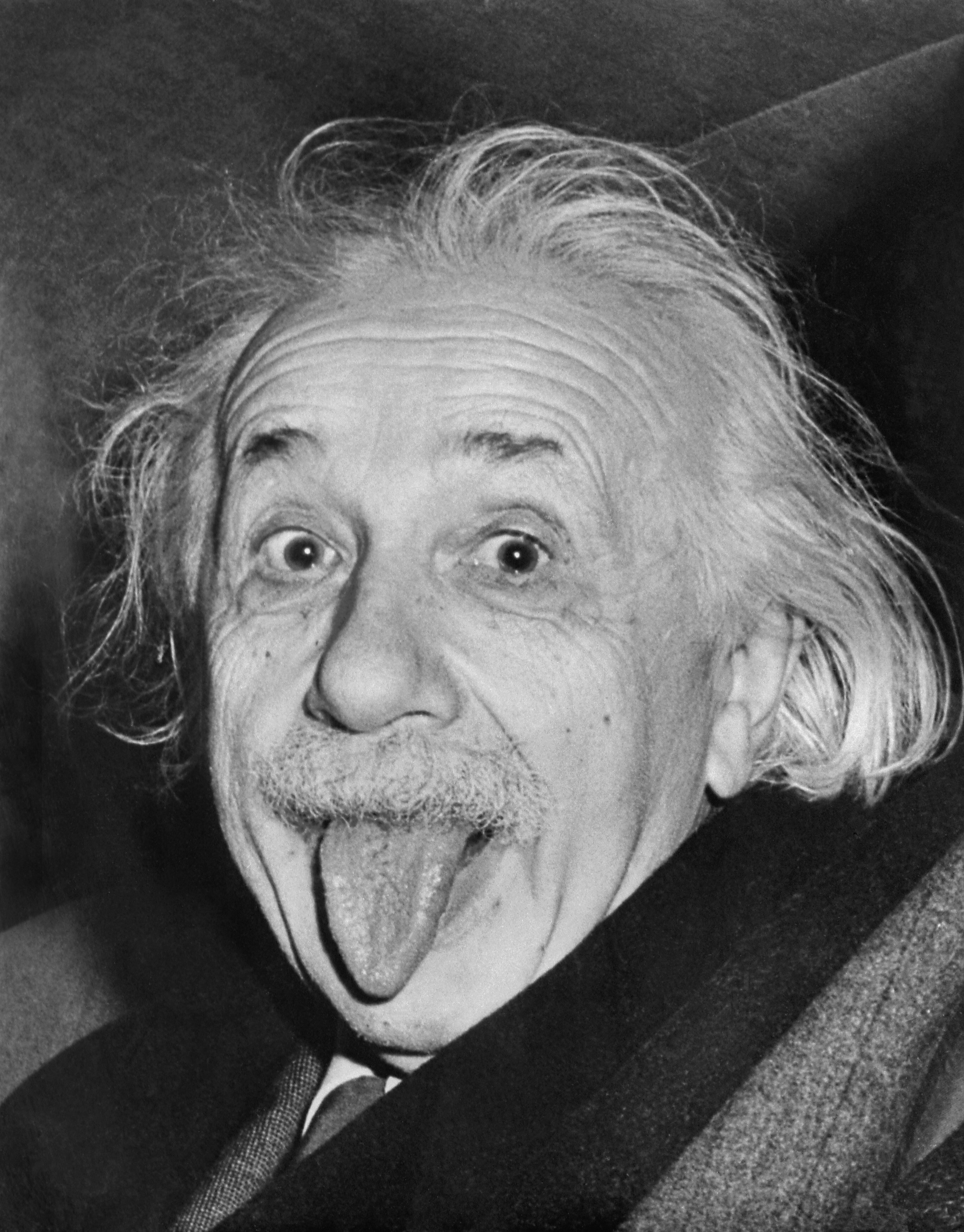
The photo of Albert Einstein sticking his tongue out

The photo of Einstein sticking his tongue out was taken on March 14, 1951, after Einstein's 72nd birthday celebration at The Princeton Club. He made the iconic shot, but the other photographers surrounding the car missed it. The appropriateness of the photo was heavily debated by Sasse's editors before being published on International News Photos Network. It became one of the most popular photos ever taken of Einstein, who himself requested nine prints for his personal use.

The picture showed a "nutty professor" and playful side of Einstein rather than the serious one that many assumed about the man.

The picture became so popular that it was widely reproduced on posters and stickers. The original picture was auctioned off for $72,300, making it the most expensive Einstein photograph ever sold.
