= Yahoo Serious =

Australian actor, director and composer (born 1953)

- Born: Greg Gomez Pead; 27 July 1953 (age 73); Cardiff, New South Wales, Australia
- Occupations: Actor; director; composer
- Years active: 1974–2000
- Spouse: Lulu Serious (c. 1988 – 2007)

Greg Gomez Pead (born 27 July 1953), known professionally as Yahoo Serious, (Note: Name-change by deed poll in 1980) is an Australian actor. His films include the comedy films Young Einstein (1988), Reckless Kelly (1993), and Mr. Accident (2000). Serious writes, directs, produces, stars in, and has composed the scores for his movies.

== Early life ==
Greg Gomez Pead was born on 27 July 1953 in Cardiff, New South Wales. He attended Glendale East Public School and Cardiff High School, then worked as a tyre fitter to pay for his tuition at the National Art School in Sydney, but was expelled.

== Career ==
After being expelled from art school, Serious co-wrote, co-produced, edited and directed at age 21 his first film, Coaltown, "with the assistance of the Australian Film Institute". Released in 1977, Coaltown explores the social and political history of coal mining.

In 1988, Serious co-wrote, produced, directed, and played the title role in Young Einstein as a young apple farmer in Tasmania who derives the formula E=mc² while trying to discover a means of creating beer bubbles, splitting the beer atom in the process. After leaving Tasmania for Sydney on the mainland to patent his discovery, he goes on to develop rock music and surfing, romances Marie Curie, and saves Paris from an atomic bomb. The film's popularity propelled Serious to stardom which saw him appear on the cover of Time magazine and the Australian edition of Mad magazine, and get his own primetime slot on MTV. The movie was a success in Australia but a critical and commercial flop upon receiving a wide release in the United States.

In 1993, Serious released his next film, Reckless Kelly, a satire about a modern descendant of the notorious Australian bank robber Ned Kelly who also becomes a movie star in Hollywood. While Reckless Kelly was a hit in Australia, it failed outside of the country and ended Serious's bid for mainstream international popularity. In 2000, Serious released his third film, Mr. Accident, about the most accident-prone man in the world. Like Reckless Kelly, the film was not a commercial success outside Australia.

Serious is a director of the Kokoda Track Foundation, a humanitarian organisation focused on Papua New Guinea.

In 2019, in a rare Q&A session at Sydney's Hayden Orpheum Picture Palace, Serious stated in response to a question about what he had been doing recently, "I have been writing and I hope to continue to make some more movies."

== Honours and awards ==
Serious received an honorary doctorate from the University of Newcastle in 1996.

Serious was a guest celebrity for the opening of the 2000 Sydney Olympics.

== Personal life ==
Shortly after the production of Young Einstein, Serious married Lulu Pinkus. Their relationship ended in 2007.

In July 2020, Serious was evicted from his Sydney rental property and ordered to pay $15,000 in rent arrears to the landlords. Serious stated that he was unable to pay due to the impacts of the COVID-19 pandemic, but was unable to substantiate this claim.

In March 2025, Serious was accused of refusing to leave the home of an elderly man who had found him homeless and sleeping in his car.

== Lawsuit against Yahoo! ==
In August 2000, Yahoo Serious sued the search engine Yahoo! for trademark infringement. The case was thrown out because Serious could not prove that he sells products or services under the name "Yahoo" and therefore could not prove that he suffered harm or confusion due to the search engine.

== Filmography ==
- Young Einstein (1988) – Actor, director, writer and producer
- Reckless Kelly (1993) – Actor, director, writer and producer
- Mr. Accident (2000) – Actor, director, writer and producer

=== As himself ===
- Cinema 3 – (1990) – TV series, 1 episode
- Waltzing Matilda: The Song That Shaped a Nation (1995) – Documentary
- In the Cannes (2007) – Short documentary film
