= Opera in The Domain =

Opera in the Domain presented by Opera Australia is an open-air concert held in the Phillip Precinct of the Royal Botanical Gardens, Sydney. Every January, thousands of Sydneysiders flock to The Domain for a night of free opera. The event itself has been running since 1982 and since 2005 has been sponsored by Mazda Australia, adopting its new name Mazda Opera in the Domain. Mazda Australia became the principal sponsor in 2012.

In 2011, Opera Australia for the first time presented the crowd favorite Carmen which attracted over 40,000 people, almost bringing the Phillip Precinct to capacity.

"Opera in the Domain" was preceded by "Opera in the Park" which commenced in 1982 with La Traviata starring Dame Joan Surtherland. Sutherland also sang the next five Operas in the Park, ensuring massive crowds.

== List of Performances ==
Year	Opera	Composer	Estimated Attendance	Date of Show	Principal Sponsor	Ref.
1982	La traviata	Giuseppe Verdi		1982		
2006	Madama Butterfly	Giacomo Puccini			Mazda	
2007	Turandot	Giacomo Puccini		27 January 2007	Mazda	
2008						
2009	Cavalleria Rusticana	Pietro Mascagni		31 January 2009	Mazda	
2009	Pagliacci	Ruggero Leoncavallo		31 January 2009	Mazda	
2010	Candide	Leonard Bernstein		30 January 2010	Mazda	
2011	Carmen	Georges Bizet	40,000+		Mazda	
2012	The Pearl Fishers	Georges Bizet		28 January 2012	Mazda	
2013	La boheme	Giacomo Puccini		2 February 2013	Mazda	
2014	"Habanera" (Carmen); "Condotta ell'era in ceppi" (Il trovatore); "Tutti i fior" (Madama Butterfly)					
2015	Arias from: Carmen; The Barber of Seville; Turnadot and Tosca; The Pearl Fishers					
2016				23 January 2016	Mazda	
2017	"Largo al factotum" (The Barber of Seville)	Gioachino Rossini		21 January 2017	Mazda	
2017	"Habanera" (Carmen)	Georges Bizet		21 January 2017	Mazda	
2017	"Votre Toast" (Carmen)	Georges Bizet		21 January 2017	Mazda	
2017	"Au fond du temple saint" (The Pearlfishers)	Georges Bizet		21 January 2017	Mazda	
2017	"Dein ist mein ganzes Herz" (Das Land des Lächelns)	Franz Lehár		21 January 2017	Mazda	
2017	"Jewel Song" (Faust)	Charles Gounod; Jules Barbier; Michel Carré		21 January 2017	Mazda	
2017	"Che gelida manina" (La bohème)	Giacomo Puccini		21 January 2017	Mazda	
2017	"Dôme épais le jasmin" (Lakmé)	Léo Delibes		21 January 2017	Mazda	
2017	"De' miei bollenti spiriti … O mio rimorso" (La Traviata)	Giuseppe Verdi		21 January 2017	Mazda	
2017	"Follie! Follie! Sempre libera" (La Traviata)	Giuseppe Verdi		21 January 2017	Mazda	
