= Farm Cove, New South Wales =

Bight in Australia

Coordinates: 33°51′40″S 151°13′08″E

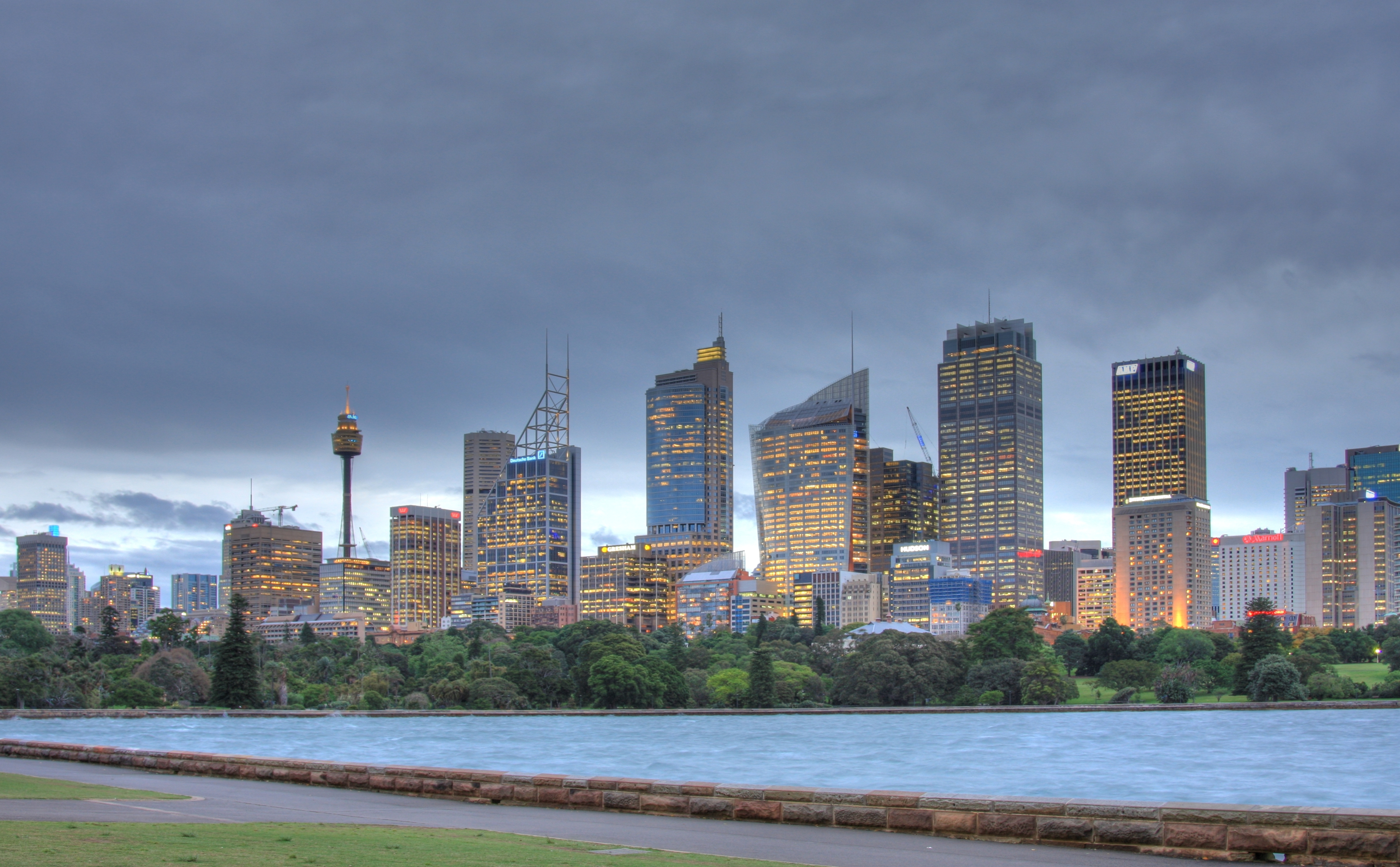
Farm Cove looking towards the City of Sydney

Farm Cove is a tidal inlet and shallow bay in Sydney Harbour, separated from Sydney Cove by Bennelong Point, New South Wales, Australia (site of the Sydney Opera House). Farm Cove is one of the places around Sydney Harbour that has been officially gazetted as a dual named site by the Geographical Names Board (GNB). The official dual name for this place is: 'Farm Cove / Wahganmuggalee'.

Known to the indigenous inhabitants of Sydney as Woccanmagully, Farm Cove was used by them as an initiation ground and for the "Kangaroo and Dog Dance". The land immediately adjacent to Farm Cove was set aside soon after first European settlement in 1788 by Governor Arthur Phillip for the Government House Domain, a private reserve for the NSW Governor. The first farm for the colony was thereafter established in the area, subsequently lending its name to the cove. After the failure of this first farm, and the transfer of agricultural efforts elsewhere in the colony, Governor Lachlan Macquarie established the Royal Botanic Garden, Sydney around Farm Cove in 1816. Farm Cove was used as an anchorage for Royal Navy, Royal Australian Navy and visiting naval vessels until the 1960s.

On 3 February 1954, Farm Cove was the site of where Queen Elizabeth II, Queen of Australia, landed at the beginning of her first visit to Australia. It was the first occasion on which a reigning monarch had set foot on Australian soil.

== Gallery ==
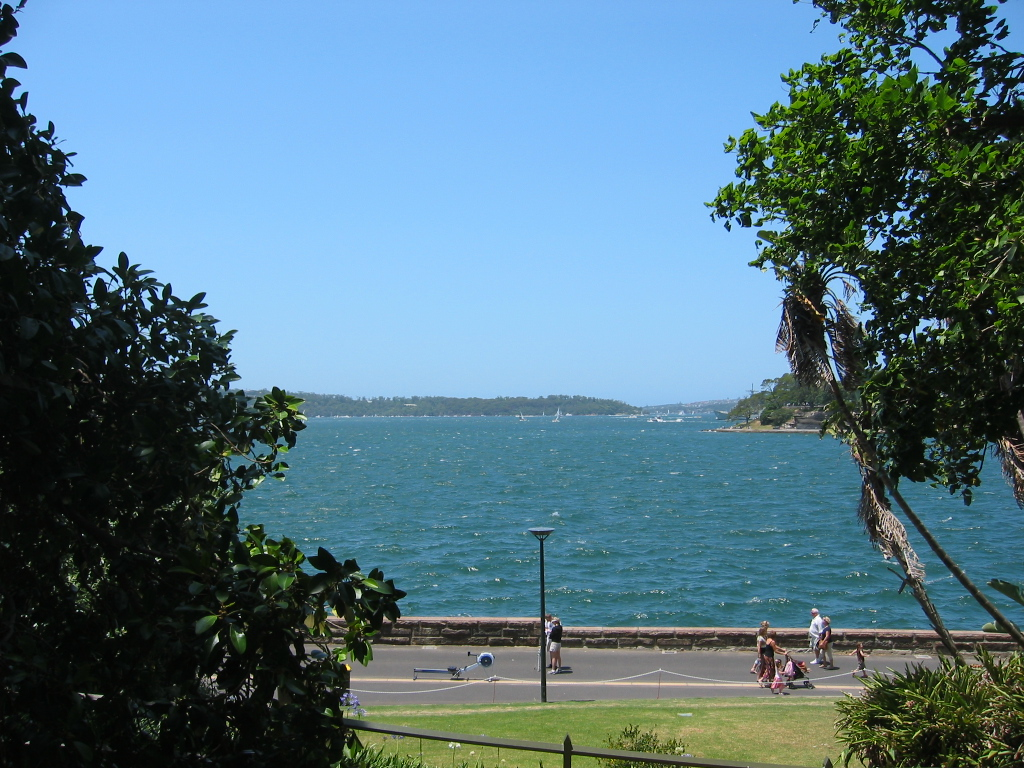
Farm Cove.

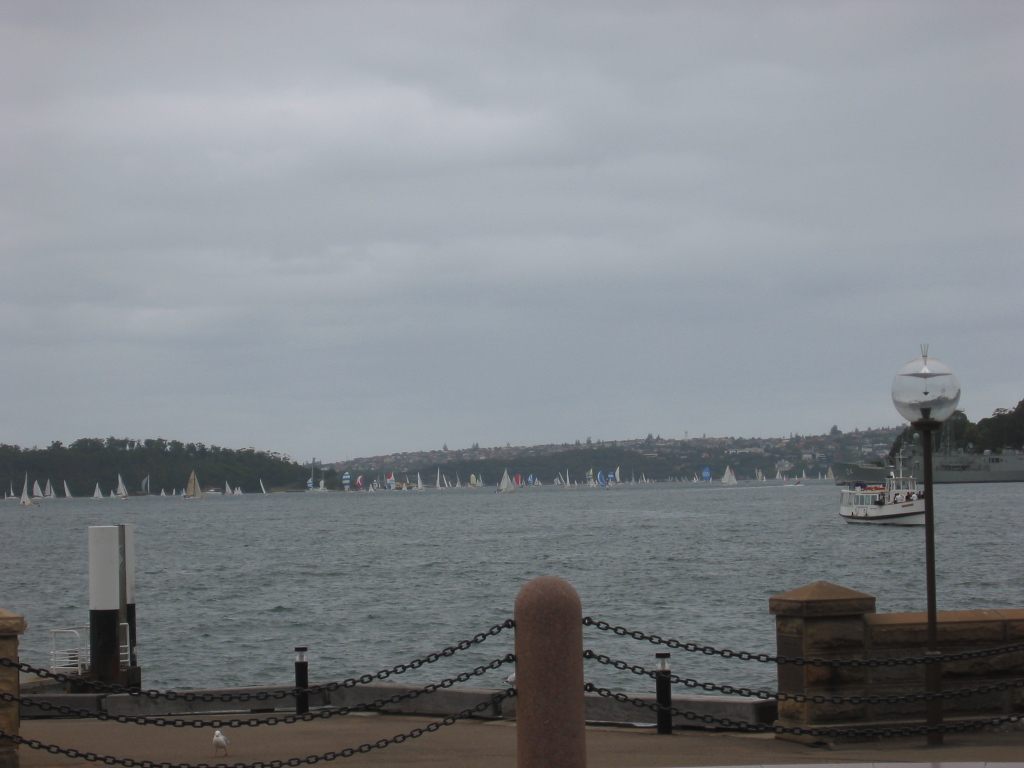
Yachts out in the harbour.

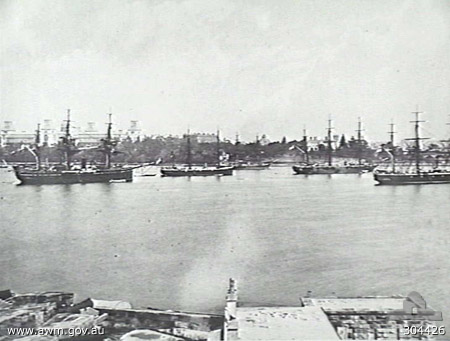
Ships of the Royal Navy's Squadron on the Australia Station moored in Farm Cove.

== See also ==
- Geography of Sydney
