= The Domain, Sydney =

Park in Sydney, Australia

The Domain
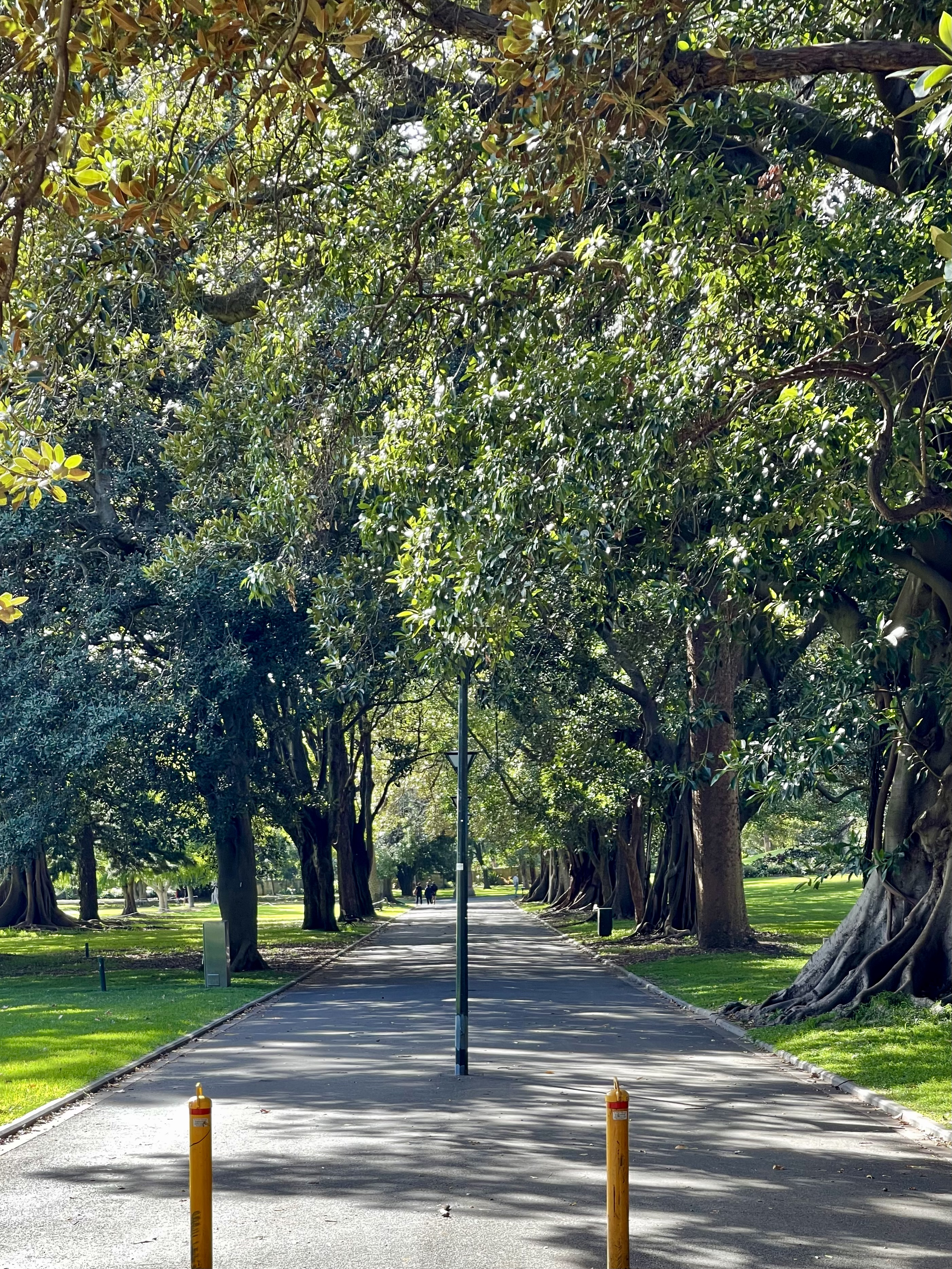
- Paths of The Domain, Sydney

- Location within Sydney
- Type: Natural area; sports fields
- Location: Sydney
- Coordinates: 33°52′6″S 151°12′53″E
- Area: 34 hectares (84 acres)
- Created: c. 1830s
- Operator: Royal Botanic Gardens & Domain Trust
- Status: Open all year
- Public transit: Wynyard, Martin Place, Circular Quay or St James; Martin Place; Circular Quay; 441, 304, 333, 396 or 343

New South Wales Heritage Register
- Official name: The Domain
- Type: State heritage (landscape)
- Designated: 2 April 1999
- Reference no.: 1070
- Builders: Charles Fraser; Allan Cunningham; Richard Cunningham; Charles Moore; Joseph Maiden; Carrick Chambers

The Domain is a heritage-listed 34-hectare (84-acre) area of open space on the eastern fringe of the Sydney central business district, Australia. Separating the central business district from Woolloomooloo, The Domain adjoins the Royal Botanic Garden and is managed by The Royal Botanic Gardens and Domain Trust, a division of the Office of Environment & Heritage. The Domain is used as a venue for outdoor concerts, open-air events, large political gatherings and rallies, as well as being used daily by the people of Sydney for exercise and relaxation. Along with the Royal Botanic Garden, The Domain was added to the New South Wales State Heritage Register on 2 April 1999.

== History ==
=== Early colonial use (1788–1809) ===
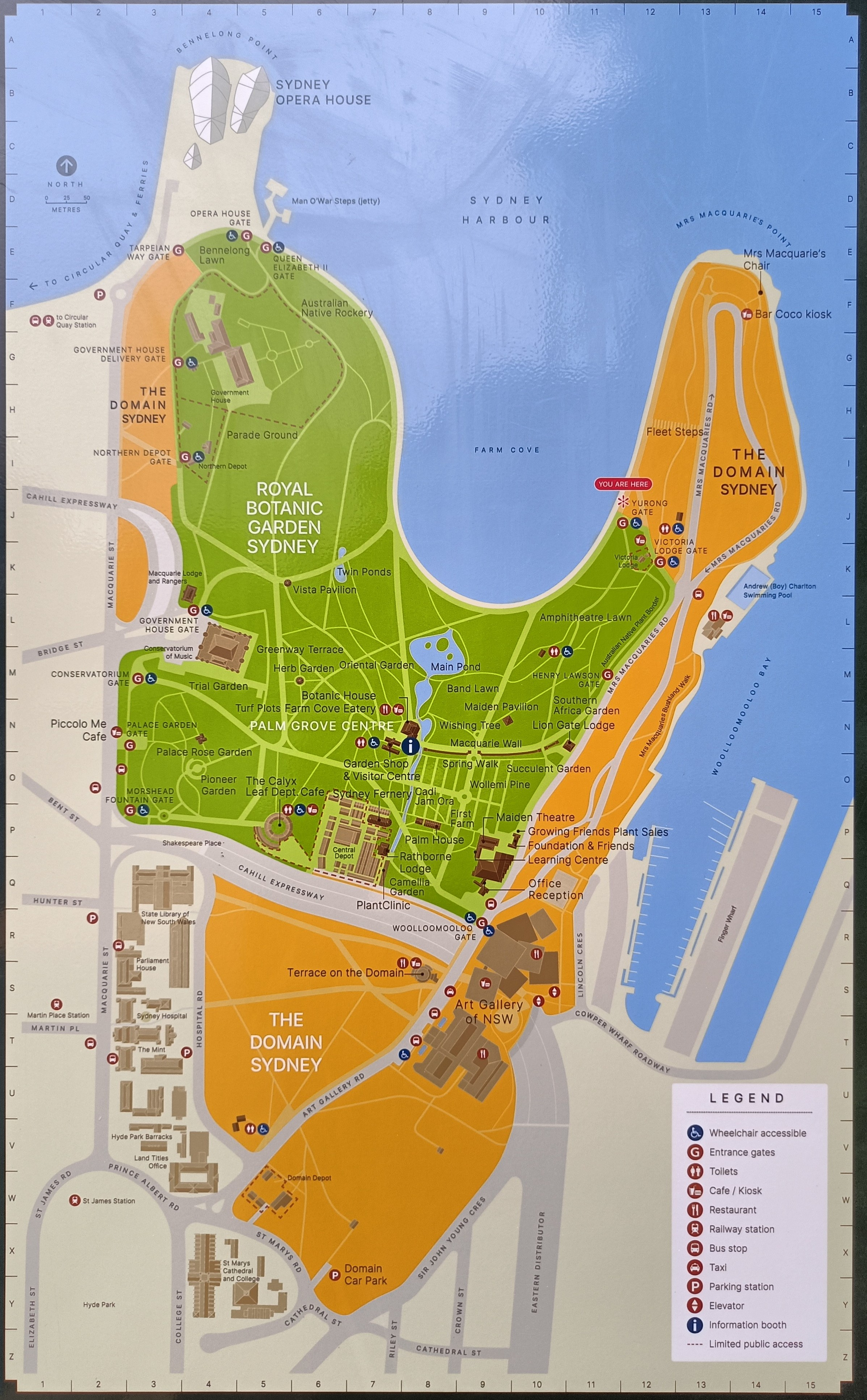
The Botanic Garden and the Domain.

By July 1788, six months after the First Fleet had landed in Sydney Cove, Governor Arthur Phillip had established "a farm of 4 hectares (9 acres) of corn" by a stream which still flows through the present palm grove into appropriately named Farm Cove. Phillip set the land aside for the Crown but did not determine what its purpose would be. He said it should be free of leaseholds but then allowed people to use it anyway, as did subsequent Acting Government and Governors. The site received the first plants and seeds brought by Phillip from Rio de Janeiro and the Cape of Good Hope. Further up the valley of the stream that flowed into Farm Cove, Governor Phillip set aside an open area for the Governor's exclusive use known as the 'Phillip Domain'. It covered the area east of the Tank Stream to the head of Woolloomooloo (Walla Mulla) Bay. By September 1788 8 hectares (20 acres) were cleared for crops. By 1789 agricultural activity had been mainly relocated to Rose Hill (Parramatta) due to much greater crop success there, and poor soil/results at Farm Cove. The Farm Cove (Woccanmagully) area was then leased out for private farming for the next twenty years. Between 1800 and 1807 grants of land were made under Governors Paterson and others to private farmers in Farm Cove's east (Anson's Point). The main botanic garden function was transferred to Rose Hill (Parramatta) between 1800 and 1810 under Governor King.

Despite a ditch being dug to define its boundary in 1792, the Domain was gradually encroached upon by others in subsequent years. Governor Bligh determined it should be the Governor's Domain in 1807 and the boundaries, especially the southern boundary, were changed. From 1807 Bligh resumed 8 hectares (19 acres) as The Domain, cancelled and converted former private farm grants on the eastern side of Farm Cove to public land incorporated back into the Governor's Domain. Farming activity decreased, buildings were demolished near (present) Government House and carriage roads around Bennelong Point and Farm Cove were constructed, along with the planting of a shrubbery and laying out of walks. Bligh's attempts to reclaim The Domain was among the many causes of the 'Rum Rebellion' of 26 January 1808.

=== Establishment of the Domain and Botanic Garden (1810–1830s) ===
The southern part of The Domain was not set aside as a public park until 1810. As soon as he arrived in 1810, Bligh's successor Governor Macquarie built stone walls around the Government House garden and the Government Domain, separating them from Hyde Park. The traditional foundation date of the Botanic Garden is taken as the date of completion of Mrs Macquarie's Road, on 13 June 1816. By 1817 the Domain was completely enclosed and the road system completed including several gates to regulate horse-drawn traffic. The Domain itself was cleared of trees and opened as a public area in the 1830s. Eventually, the Inner Domain, the area closest to Government House, was entirely consumed by the Government Gardens while the area now known as the Domain was then the Outer Domain. Macquarie improved the garden, building a protecting wall on the harbour side and constructing and landscaping a road running around The Domain, north of the Government gardens/nursery at some distance from the shore, and bridging over Farm Cove Creek to Mrs Macquarie's Chair on Mrs Macquarie's Point in the east. Swamp mahogany (Eucalyptus robusta) trees were planted to line this road, perhaps the earliest "Street trees" planted in the colony. Another 1813–1816 planting was of the black booyong (Heritiera actinophylla) west of the palm grove, which remains. On the completion of these works the area was officially inaugurated as a Botanic Garden in 1816. In 1821 the Government House stables (now the Conservatorium of Music), designed by Government Architect Francis Greenway, was completed in The Domain's north near Macquarie and Bridge streets.

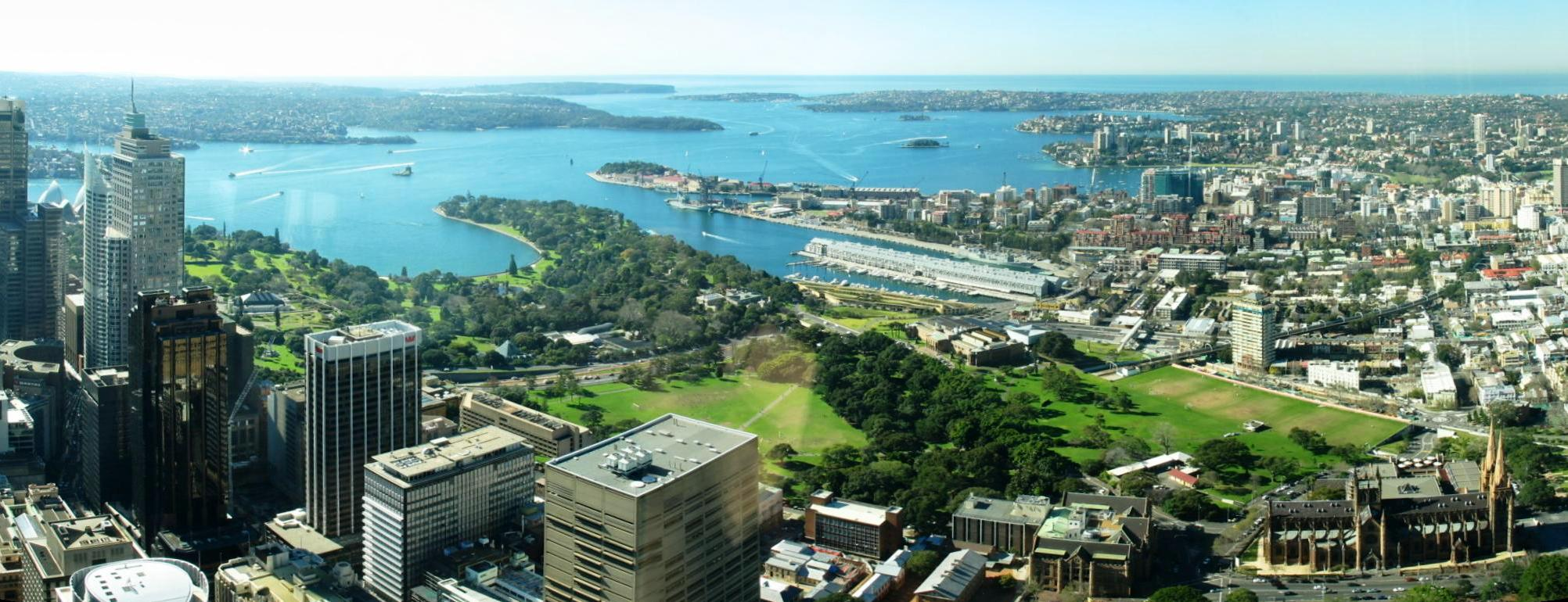
The Domain stretching across from the bottom right to the centre. 2003

Despite the Domain being whittled away in subsequent years it remained an important buffer to the Botanic Garden. The native vegetation was cleared and the gullies of Phillip Precinct filled. During the 1830s the expansive green space of the Domain was now opened to the public, who strolled and picnicked there. The Domain west of Macquarie Street was then sold to pay for the construction of new Government House and Circular Quay. Throughout the 19th century, the south-western part of The Domain was gradually taken up by government and public buildings, including the Hyde Park Barracks, the Sydney Mint, Sydney Hospital, Parliament House, the State Library of New South Wales and the Land Registry Office. The Art Gallery of New South Wales was built on the eastern side of The Domain.

In 1831 the public use of The Domain was formally invited by Governor Darling, and became accepted policy (very controlled before that). In the 1830s the Lower Garden area at the head of Farm cove was developed and the shoreline laid out in an ornamental fashion with serpentine paths. Between 1837 and 1845 Government House built in The Domain's north (north of the current extent of the gardens).

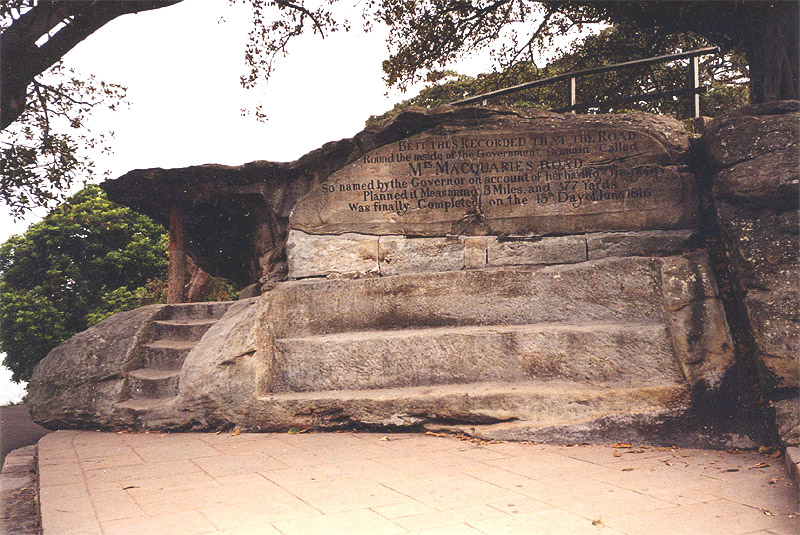
Mrs Macquarie's Chair was created in 1816.

=== The Domain Cricket Ground ===
Cricket matches, which had been played in Hyde Park since the early 19th century, moved to the Domain in the 1850s. New South Wales had beaten Victoria by three wickets in their first inter-colonial match held in Melbourne in 1856. The return match was played in the Domain from 14 to 16 January 1857 and New South Wales won again, this time by 65 runs.

Although used for cricket for the next 14 years, the Domain was not a high quality ground even by the standards of the day. It was a rough, uneven, open paddock and cricketers clashed with the public who insisted it was public parkland. It was also still used to graze cattle and cow pats often had to be removed before a game could begin. Despite the fact that a game of cricket was a major occasion, often attended by the Governor, and the leading players promenaded with their ladies, the ground was not enclosed and spectators could not be charged an entrance fee.

These continuing problems were well known to those who attended a public meeting in the Domain on 13 December 1859 when the New South Wales Cricket Association was formed. The search began for a more suitable ground and was still going on when the first England side toured Australia in 1862. In the absence of another venue, they played a NSW XXII at the Domain.

A solution of sorts to the venue problem was found when the Albert Ground opened in Redfern on 29 October 1864. Although it featured good facilities for players and crowd alike, the cost to the NSWCA of staging matches there was so high that it continued to use the Domain until the early 1870s. In all, six first-class matches were played in the Domain between the 1856–57 and 1868–69 seasons.

Season	Teams	Date	Result	Ref
1856–57	New South Wales v Victoria	14–16 January 1857	New South Wales won by 65 runs	
1858–59	New South Wales v Victoria	20–22 January 1859	Victoria won by 2 wickets	
1860–61	New South Wales v Victoria	14–16 February 1861	Victoria won by 21 runs	
1862–63	New South Wales v Victoria	5–7 February 1863	New South Wales won by 84 runs	
1866–67	New South Wales v Victoria	26–27 December 1866	New South Wales won by an innings and 13 runs	
1868–69	New South Wales v Victoria	4–6 March 1869	Victoria won by 78 runs	

=== Developments and events in the twentieth century ===
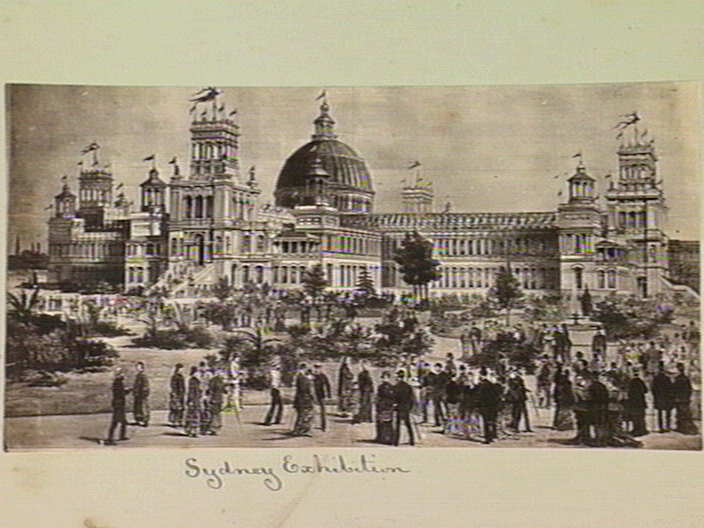
The International Exhibition of 1879 at the Garden Palace

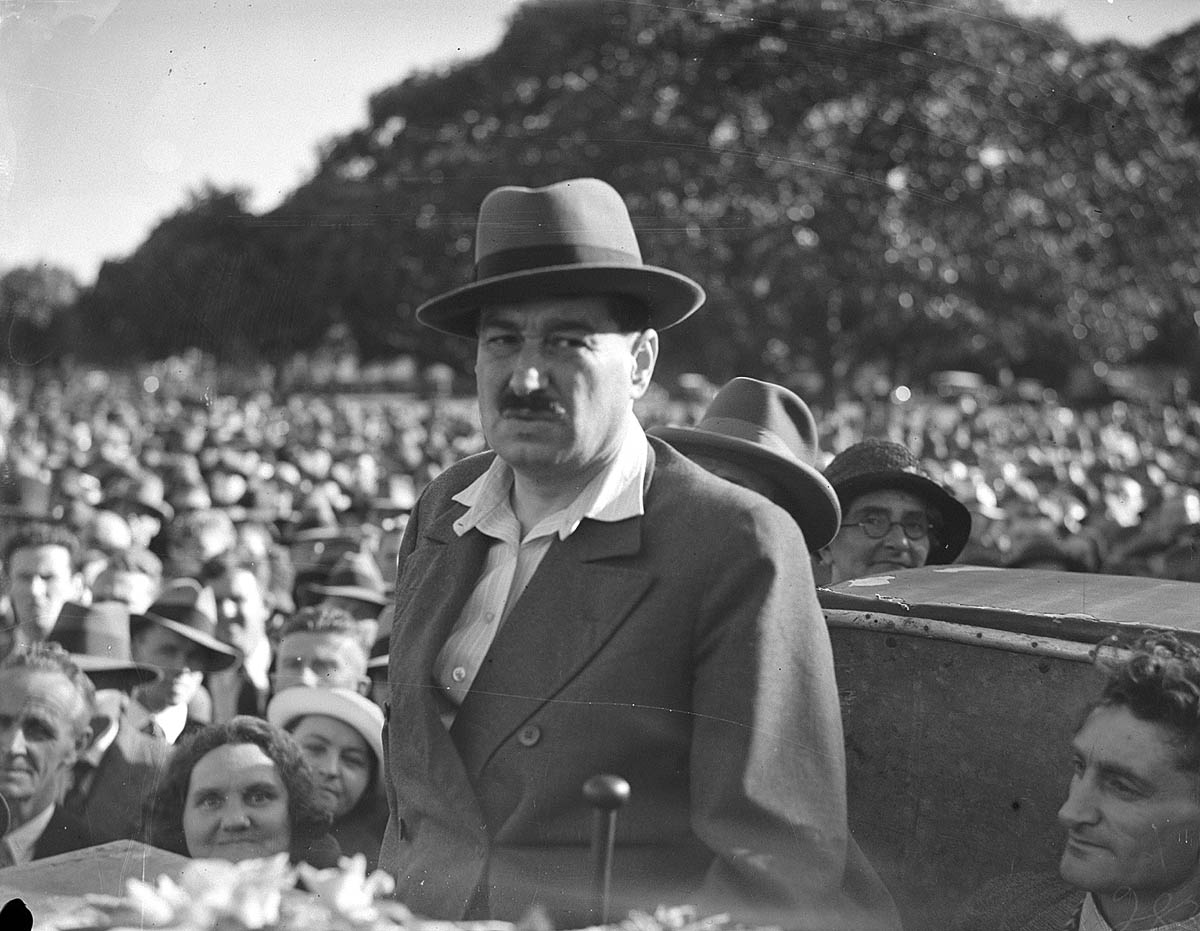
Czech journalist Egon Kisch in the Domain warning of the dangers of fascism, 1935.

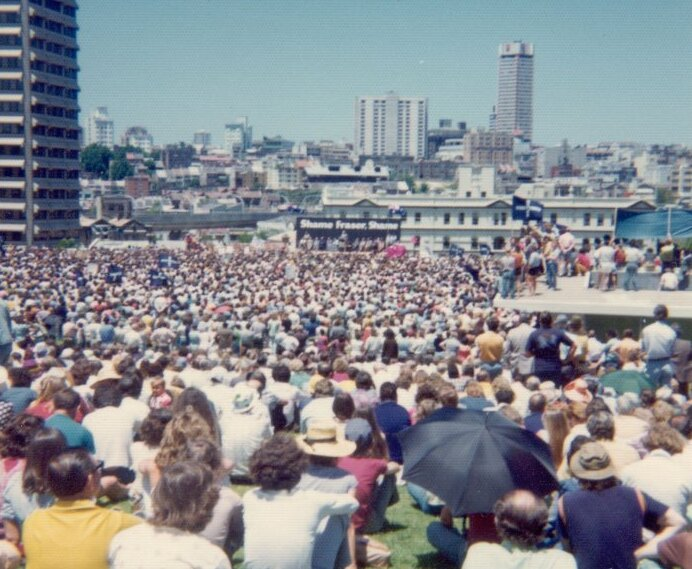
Crowd at ALP policy launch in the Domain on 24 November 1975

The Domain was subsequently used for military and ceremonial events and evolved as a venue for soap box oratory and political meetings. From 1860 the Domain was opened up at night to pedestrians, allowing people to use this valuable recreational space on summer evenings. It became known as the Park where the Gates Never Close. Carriage traffic however remained restricted after dusk for many years. In c. 1865 The Domain gate lodge and gates were built at the junction of Hospital Road and Prince Albert Road, and the Victoria Lodge gate house and gates were built east of the Botanic Garden near Mrs Macquarie's Point.

The growing city of Sydney put great pressure on the Domain. A major encroachment was the construction of the Garden Palace for the Sydney International Exhibition (1879). Only its gates and some statues remain after a fire in 1882. The site of the Garden Palace was later absorbed into the Royal Botanic Garden. In 1883 2 hectares (5 acres) of Outer Domain was incorporated into the Lower Garden, completing the ring of waterfront along Farm Cove. In the 1880s the Tarpeian Rock is a prominent, dramatic and significant sandstone cliff landscape feature on the north west boundary of The Domain facing Bennelong Point and the Sydney Opera House, cut for the extension of Macquarie Street. It derives its name from the famous rock on the Capitoline Hill in Rome from where prisoners were hurled to their deaths in ancient times. A stairway gives access from close to the Sydney Opera House to the top of the rock and the gardens. An early carving in the sandstone cliff is located about 3 metres (9.8 ft) above the fifth step from the base of the cliff. The carving reads "The Tarpeian Way". It possibly dates from the time of construction in the 1880s.

Between 1908 and 1916 the Conservatorium of Music was created in adapted former Governor's Stables in the Western Domain. By 1916 there were 72.6 hectares (179 acres) of gardens/Domain. During the 1920s, cut and cover tunnelling impacted the Western Domain to create City Circle underground rail line. Between 1956 and 1959 Outer Domain land was taken by Sydney City Council to construct a car park (now the Domain Car Parking station), with the resultant loss of 47 relatively rare trees, and land. The parking station can be accessed via a moving footway from College Street, near St Mary's and other surrounding roads.

A number of significant political rallies and meetings have occurred in the Domain, including Palm Sunday rallies, May Day demonstrations, and anti-war and anti-conscription protests. On 17 February 1935, the Czech journalist Egon Kisch addressed a crowd of 18,000 in the Domain warning of the dangers of Hitler's Nazi regime. His visit was organised by the Movement Against War and Fascism and vehemently opposed by the Lyons Government. Kisch polarized Australian politics in 1935 when he denounced Hitler's Nazi government and warned of war and concentration camps. During the bitter election campaign following the Australian constitutional crisis of 1975 the Australian Labor Party and its leader Gough Whitlam (who had recently been dismissed as Prime Minister by the Governor-General) held their policy launch in 'the Domain' on 24 November 1975 before a huge crowd. 30,000 attended the gathering, overspilling the Domain.

For decades, starting in the 1950s, the resistance fighter and anarchist Jelesko Grancharoff went to the Domain each Sunday to distribute anarchist newspapers, first Freedom, and later his own newspaper, Red and Black.

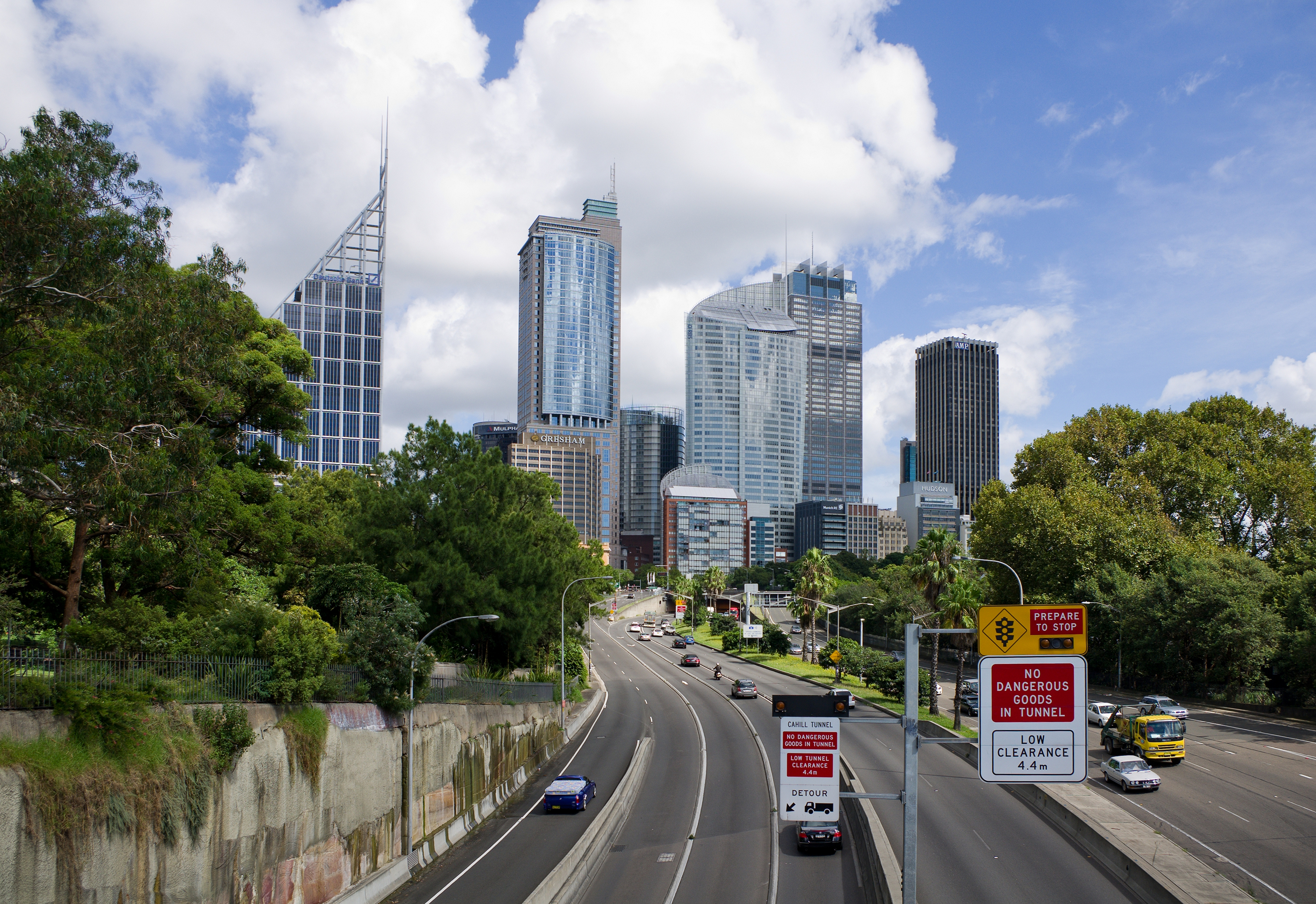
The Cahill Expressway as it passes through The Domain

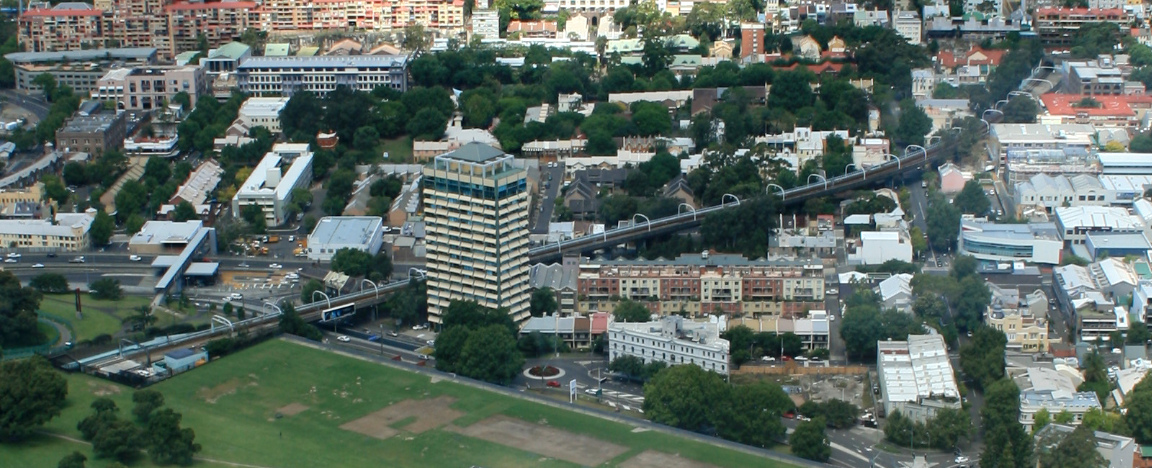
The Eastern Suburbs Line railway exits the tunnel on the eastern side of The Domain and proceeds across Woolloomooloo as a viaduct

In more recent years, major transport projects have affected the Domain. The most significant of these was the building of the Cahill Expressway in 1952. As part of this project to build an eastern tributary to the Sydney Harbour Bridge, the small roads to the north and east of the Domain were widened into expressways. After the completion of the project, traffic moving south from the Bridge could pass through a tunnel built into the western part of the Royal Botanic Tunnels, after which it became a sunken road built into the northern edge of The Domain. The road crosses the eastern part of The Domain in a tunnel, exiting through the slope on the east side of The Domain, after which it continues south along the eastern edge of the Domain as the Eastern Distributor. The Cahill Expressway emphatically separated The Domain from the Royal Botanic Garden, and destroyed the close spatial relationship between the garden and The Domain. Between 1958 and the 1960s, the Cahill Expressway resumption and construction work began, dissecting The Domain and Botanic Garden, partly destroying Fig Tree Avenue (first entrance, planted 1847) and loss of 24 palm trees and 12 other trees lost. The Domain and the Botanic Gardens were severed for the first time since 1792. Then in the 1970s, the rail tunnel for the Eastern Suburbs Line was built under the southern part of the Domain: the railway exits the tunnel on the eastern slopes of The Domain, after which (owing to the large change in ground elevation) it becomes a viaduct. Concrete ventilation shafts for Martin Place station are located on Hospital Road. In 1992, the Sydney Harbour Tunnel was built, with its southern section under the northwestern part of The Domain.

=== Developments in the twenty-first century ===
In 2000 the toilet block in the Palm Grove was adapted and extended to become the Garden Shop, renamed the Palm Grove Centre. In 2000–01 a new police memorial wall was erected in outer Domain to the south of the Art Gallery of NSW. The Conservatorium of Music was redeveloped with new underground extensions, demolition of trial grass beds and incorporation of new roof garden areas to gardens over the new conservatorium. A new land bridge was built (completed in 2005) over the Cahill Expressway/Eastern Distributor redevelopment, linking the Art Gallery of NSW, Mrs Macquarie's Road, Domain and Gardens, small additional land area and new native plantings to the Domain. In 2002 the Andrew "Boy" Charlton Pool was redeveloped by the Sydney City Council in the outer Domain on Woolloomooloo Bay.

In 2004 new sound walls were built (and their inside face planted) facing the Cahill Expressway to mitigate increased noise from the Cross City Tunnel and expressway into the Phillip Precinct of The Domain. Also that year in that precinct of the Domain, the tree plantation in the Phillip Precinct of the Domain facing Hospital Road was replaced in some public controversy, removing ten previously existing trees and planting 30 replacements (hoop pines, white figs and Washingtonia robusta fan palms) in a triple avenue arrangement.

In its present configuration, The Domain covers 34 hectares (84 acres) and is still a popular venue for Sydney residents and visitors to relax and enjoy views of the City and Sydney Harbour. On any weekday lunchtime, its roads are filled with joggers and its grass used for corporate soccer and touch football competitions.

== Description and features ==
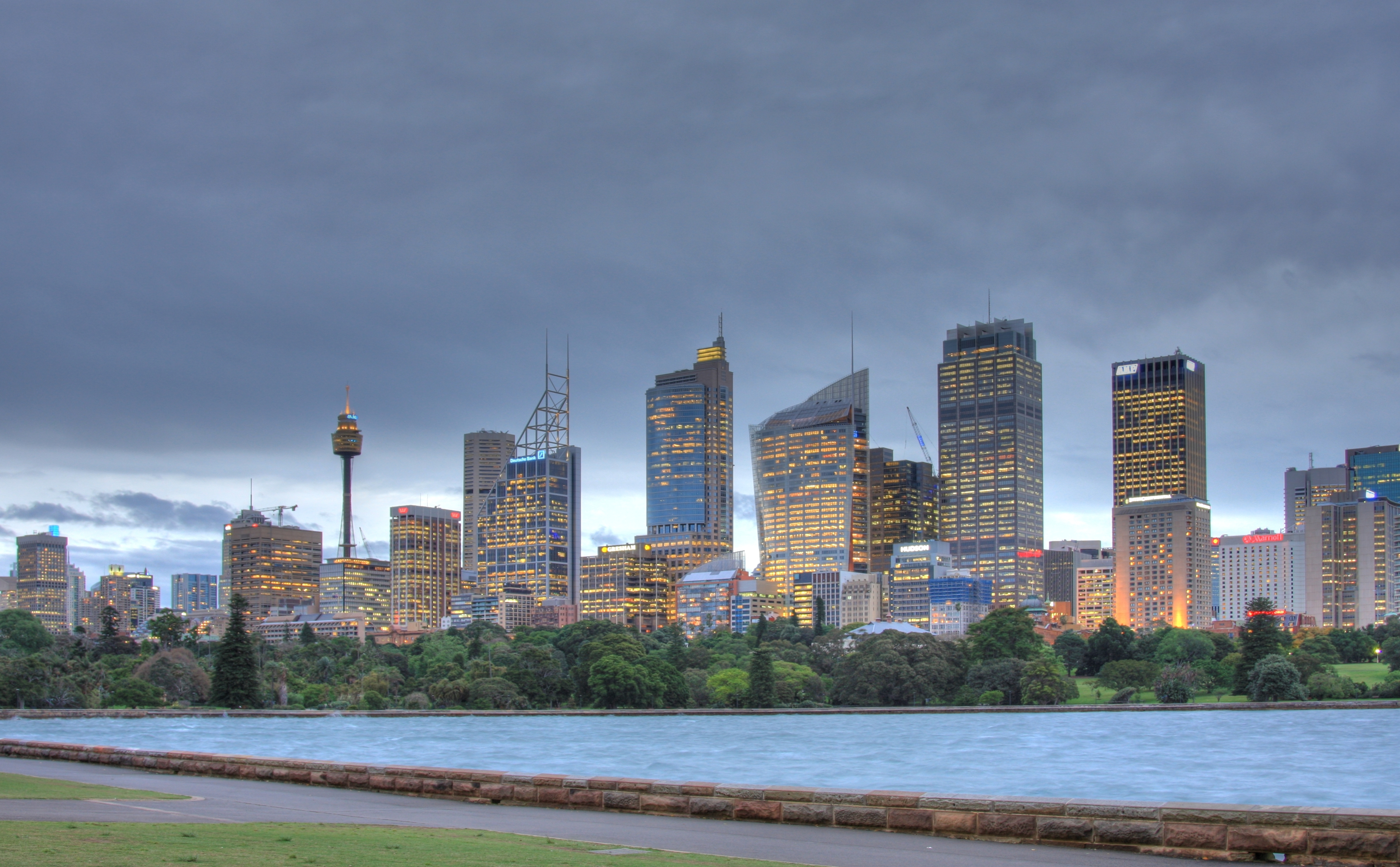
Sydney skyline at dusk, view from Mrs Macquarie Point, The Domain

The Domain today begins in the south on St Mary's Road, to the north of St Mary's Cathedral and the northeast of Hyde Park, and ends in the north at Mrs Macquarie's Point, a headland on Sydney Harbour. It is roughly divided into three sections by a road running north–south (Art Gallery Road in the south, Mrs Macquarie's Road in the north), and the east-west Cahill Expressway: the Domain occupies roughly the south-west, south-east and north-east quadrants formed by these roads, while the Royal Botanic Garden is to the north-west. From the north-west corner of the south-west quadrant, a small band of parkland extends north along the western edge of the Royal Botanic Garden, leading to an elevated open area overlooking the Sydney Opera House, which is also part of The Domain.

=== South-west: Phillip Precinct ===
The part of the Domain to the west of Art Gallery Road and to the south of Cahill Expressway consists of a large open grassed area surrounded by groups of mature trees to the east and south. It is named "Phillip Precinct" after Arthur Phillip. This area is crossed by several walkways, and has a restaurant called "Pavilion on the Park" in the north-east corner. The public institutions of Macquarie Street, such as Sydney Hospital, Parliament House and the State Library, back onto the park. Being easily accessible from Sydney's financial district via walkways through these public buildings, this part of the park is a popular area for city workers to relax, exercise and play sports. This open area frequently hosts meetings and events. During the summer months, a temporary stage is erected in the south of this area, and concerts and other events are held, with the remainder of the open grass area used for seating. The north side of this area is marked by an open-air section of the Cahill Expressway, sunken below the ground level of the park.

Speakers Corner (an area for public speaking) is located in the northeastern part of this part of the Domain, close to the Art Gallery of New South Wales. Officially established in 1878, this area was historically an important gathering place where any person may turn up unannounced and talk on any subject they wish, although they were likely to be heckled by people holding opposing views. This has historically been the focal point of free speech in Sydney. Although now largely disused, the corner's role is enshrined in legislation, and a steel platform with engravings commemorating notable speakers still occasionally attracts speakers on Sunday afternoons.

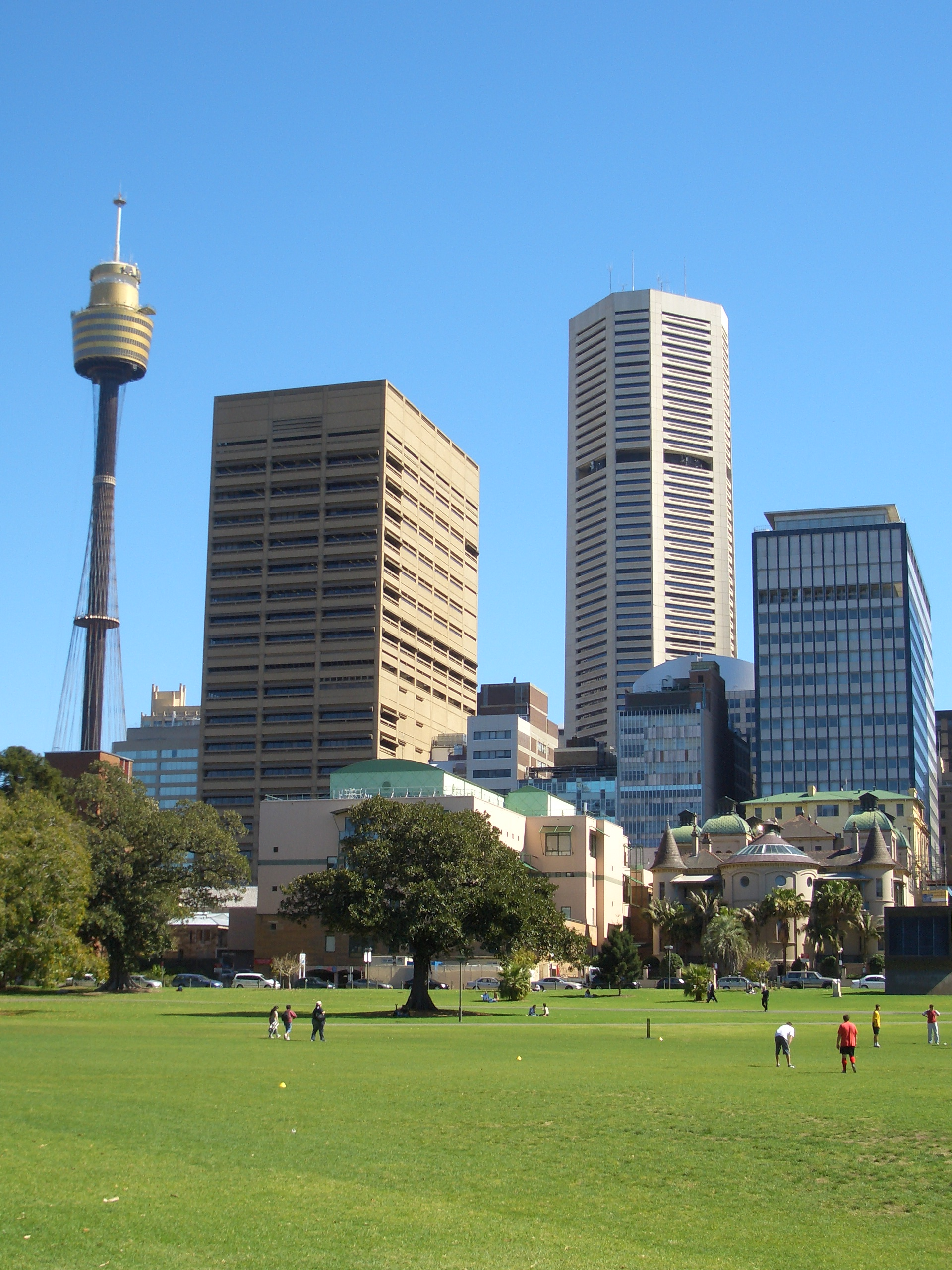
Casual sport on the open grassland

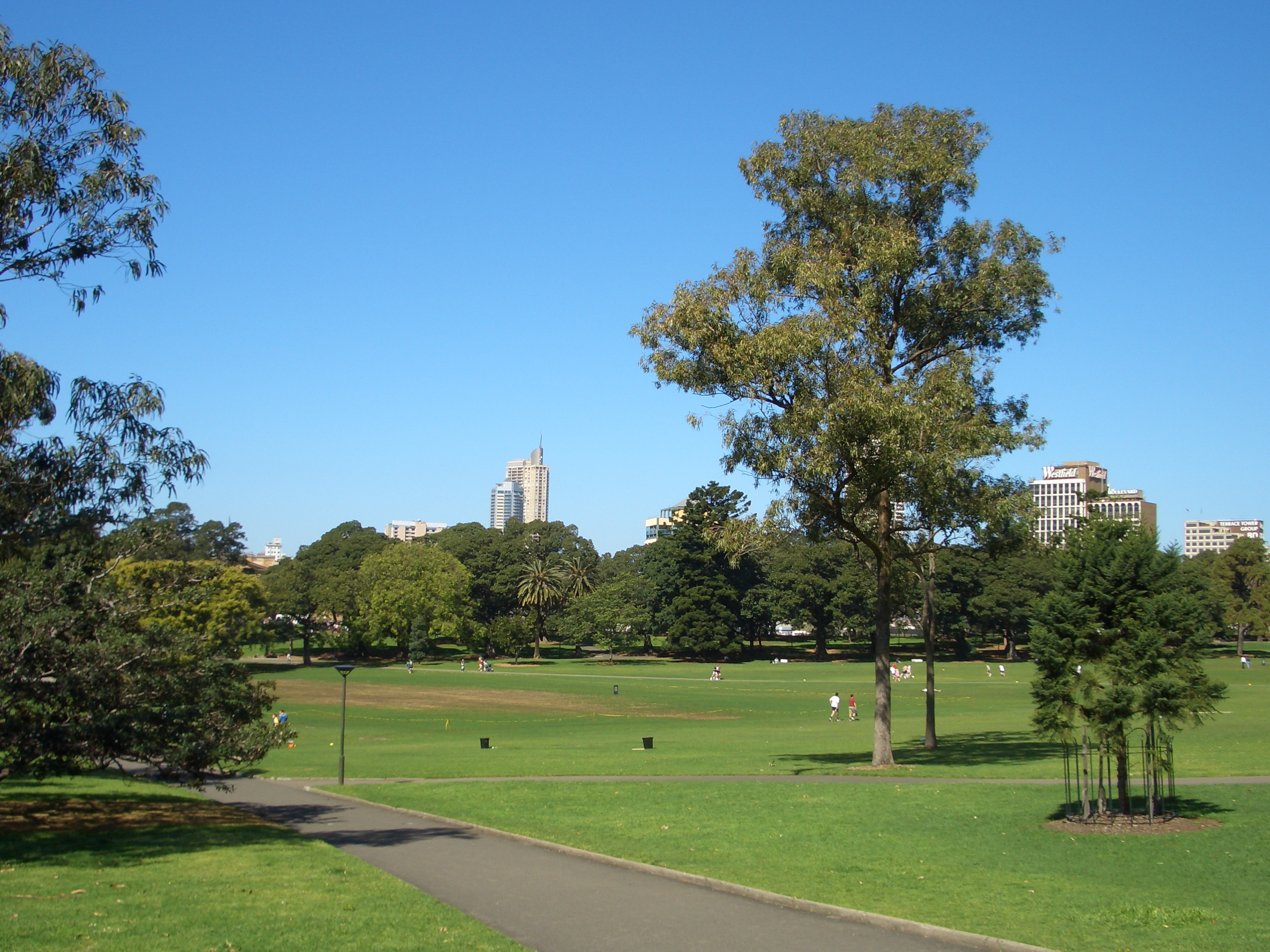
The Domain on a spring day

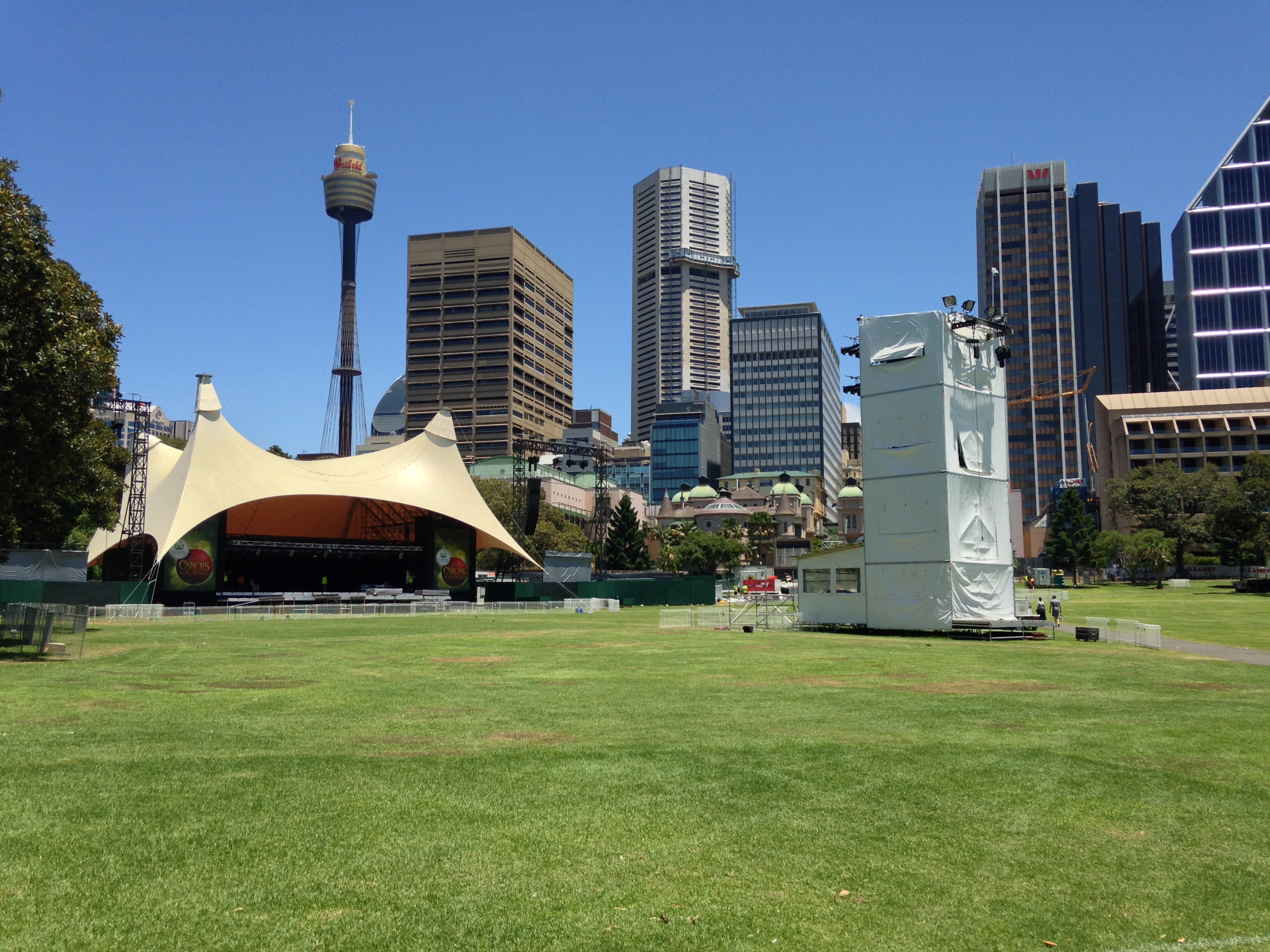
The temporary summer stage

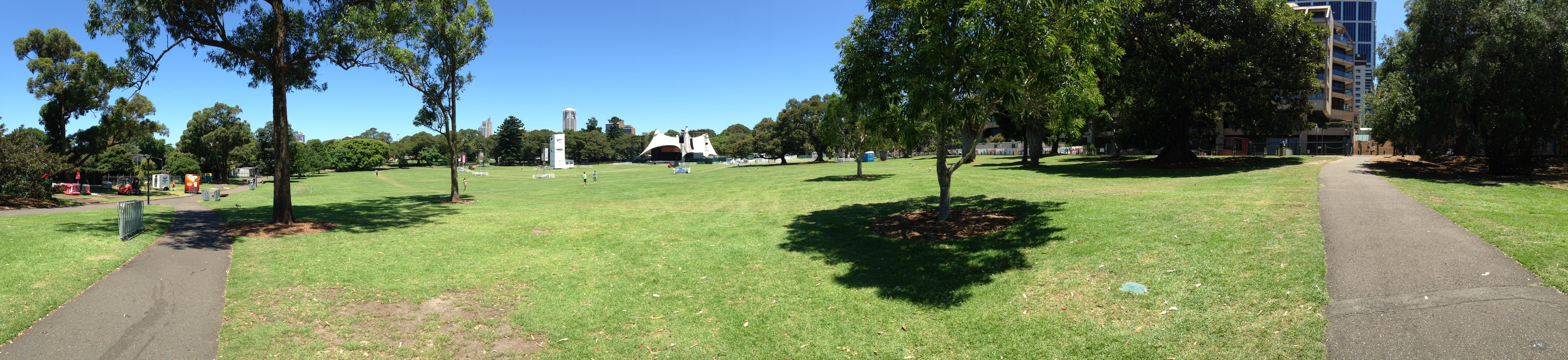
Panorama of the Phillip precinct

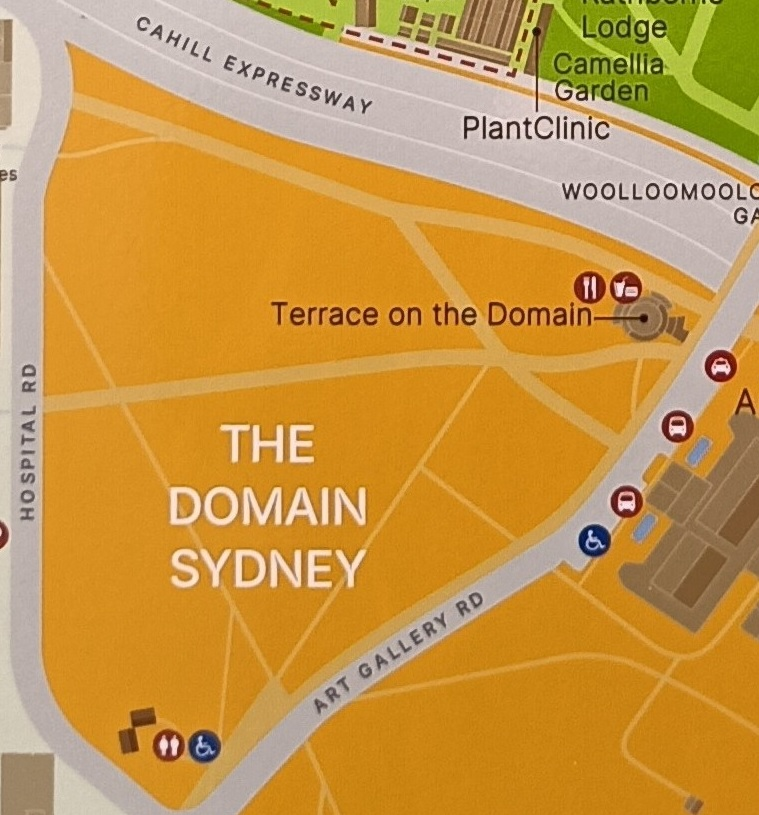
Phillip precinct

=== South-east: Crescent Precinct ===
The part of the Domain to the east of Art Gallery Road and to the south and west of Cahill Expressway falls in the east via a sharp slope towards the much lower-lying Woolloomooloo. It is named the "Crescent Precinct" after the Sir John Young Crescent that marks its eastern boundary. This part of the Domain contains the Art Gallery of New South Wales and it has a large neo-classical façade facing Art Gallery Road and a modern extension built onto the eastern slope that was completed in 2022 . Near the southern end of Art Gallery Road is the main entrance to the Domain from the junction of Prince Albert Road, College Street and St Mary's Road, which features a historical gatehouse and playing fields are also located in the south-east of this area, built above the Domain Parking Station.

The Domain Parking Station is a 1,130 space car park that caters predominantly for The Art Gallery of NSW patrons, The Domain event attendees, and inner city workers, now known as "Domain Car Park". The Domain Car Park also houses a moving walkway which takes parkers from the car park to the top of Hyde Park. The walkway, or travelator, is 207 metres in length. The Express Walkway features a painted mural, "Tunnel Vision – Sydney" created by internationally known Sydney born artist Tim Guider in 1996. The mural includes one of the world's earliest light sculpture installations at the Hyde Park entrance. The mural is painted along both walls for the entire length of the walkway and features Aboriginal and local scenes. The walkway has been the longest continuous moving walkway in the world since its construction in 1961.

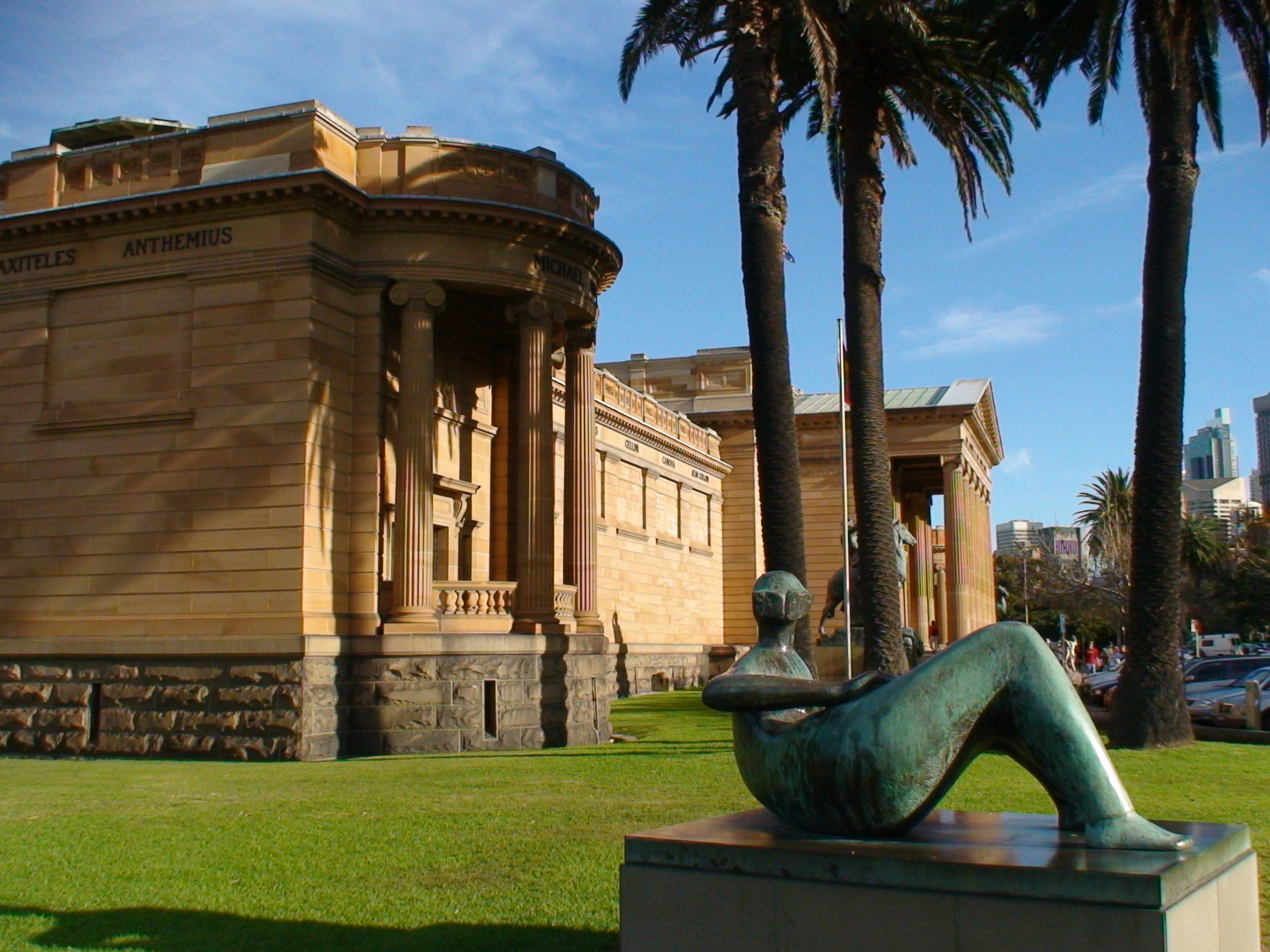
The Art Gallery of New South Wales. 2008

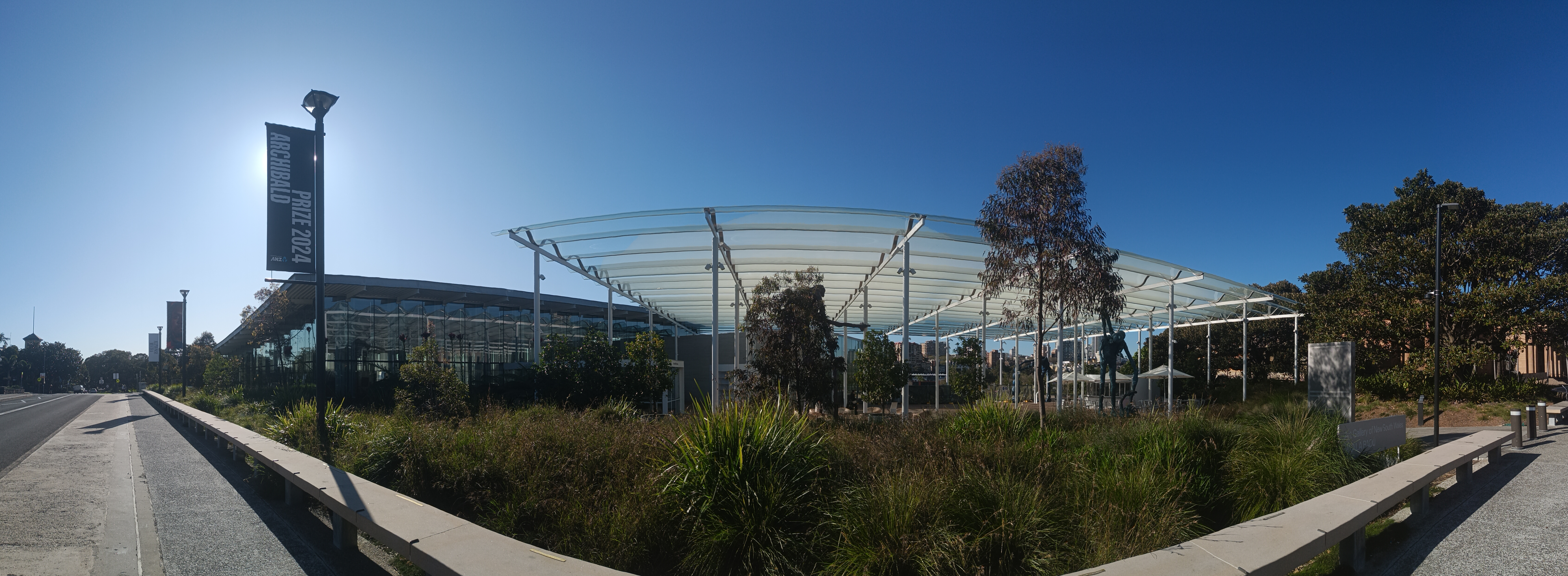
View looking east towards the Art Gallery of New South Wales. 2024

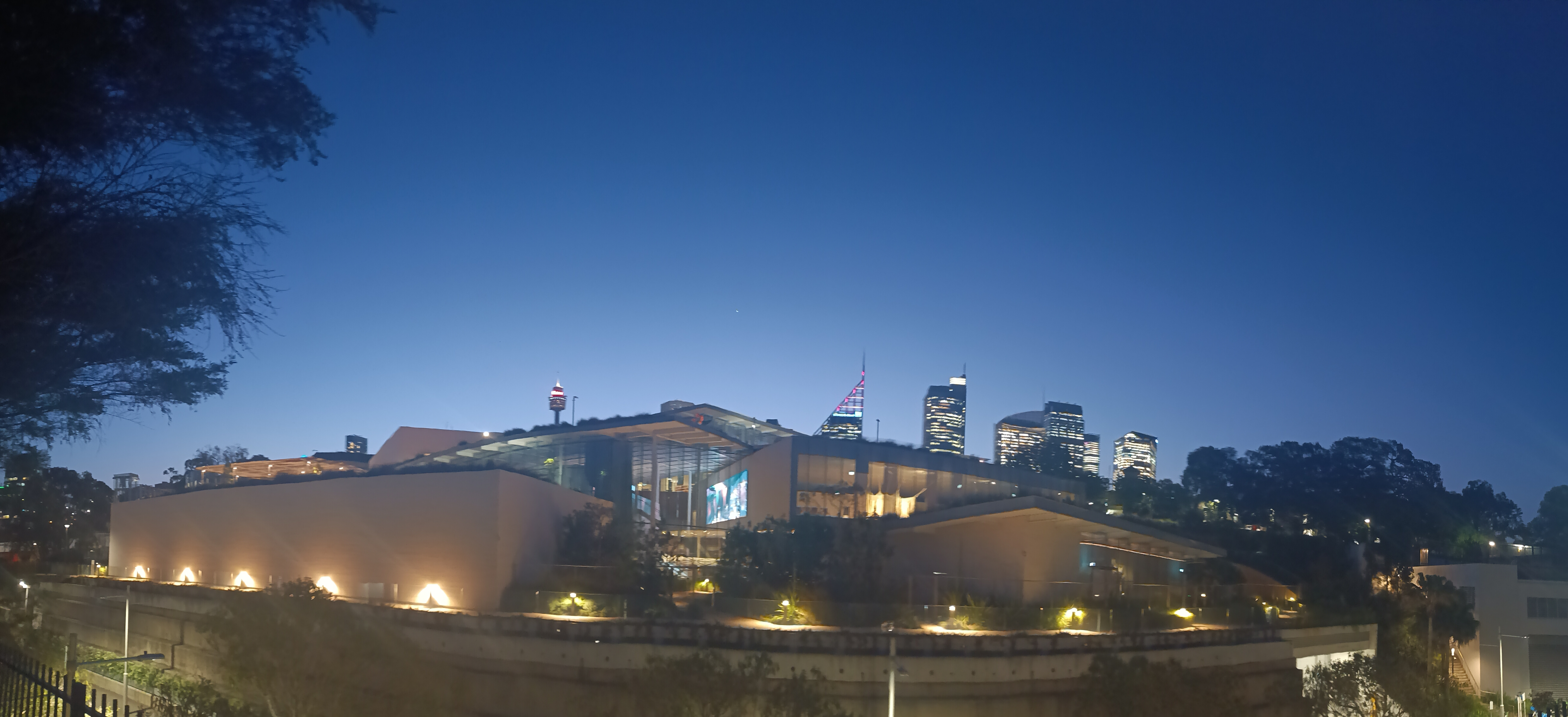
View looking west towards the Art Gallery of New South Wales. 2024

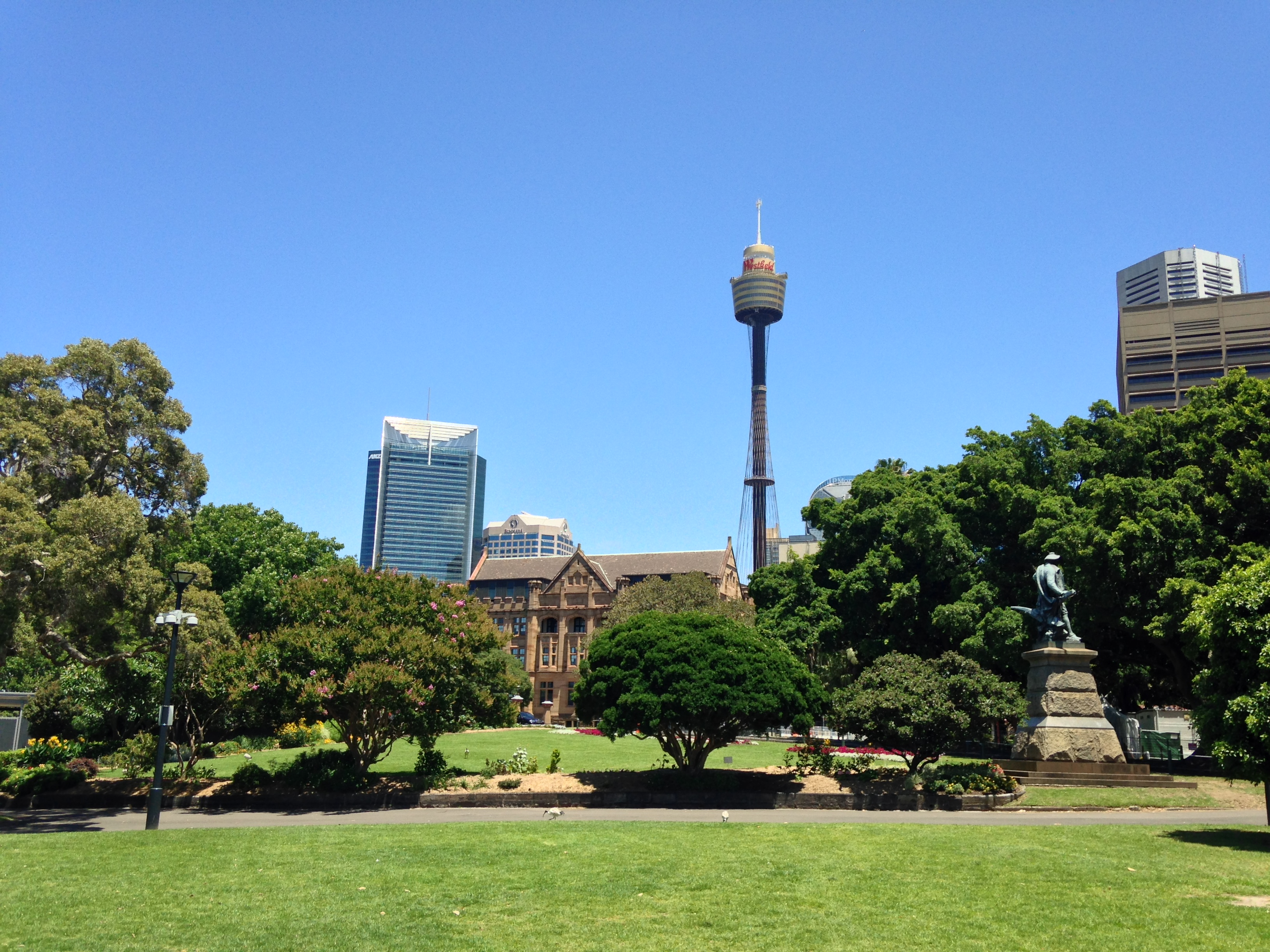
The Robbie Burns statue

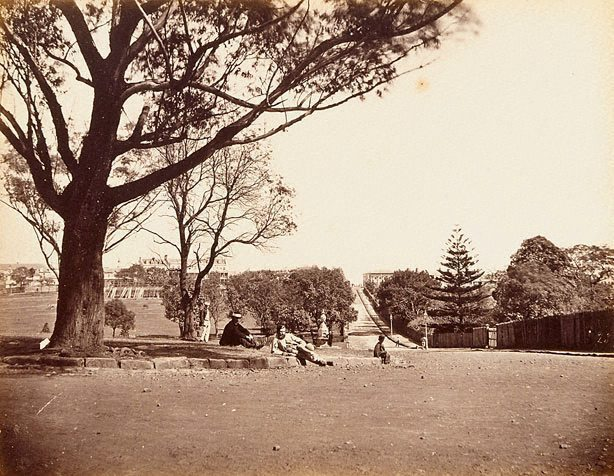
The Crescent precinct in the 1870s

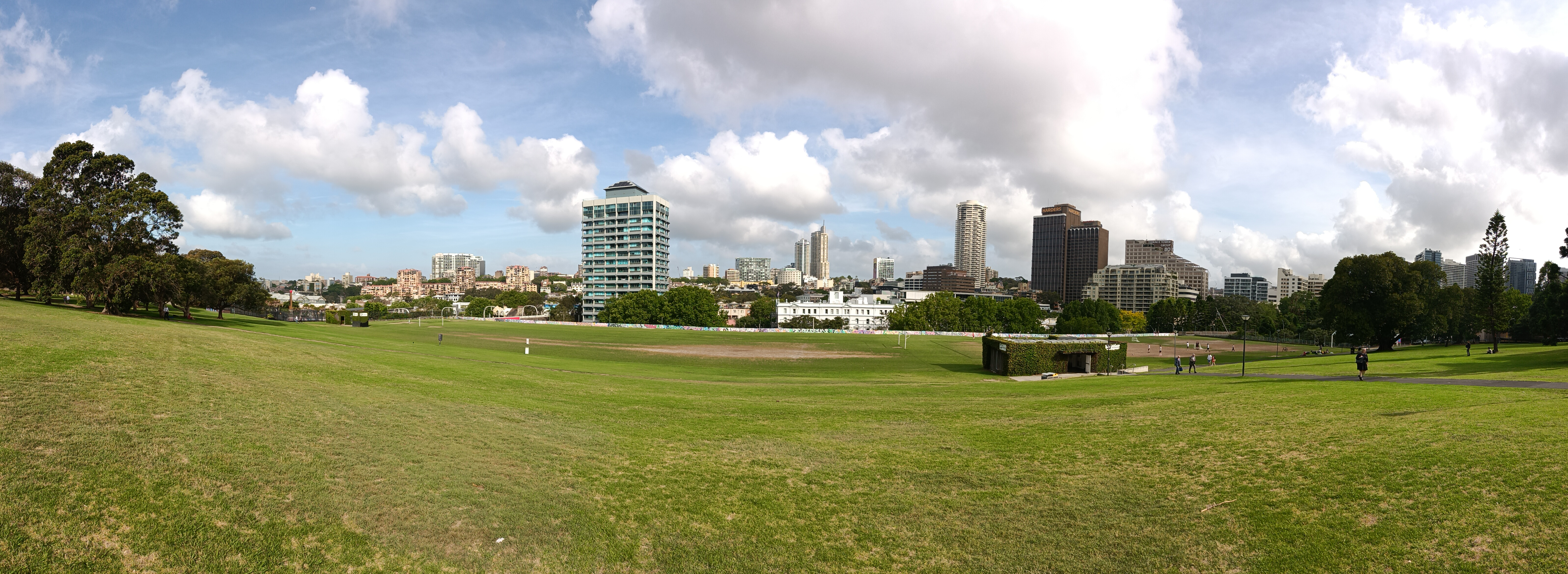
The slope at the eastern end of the Domain.

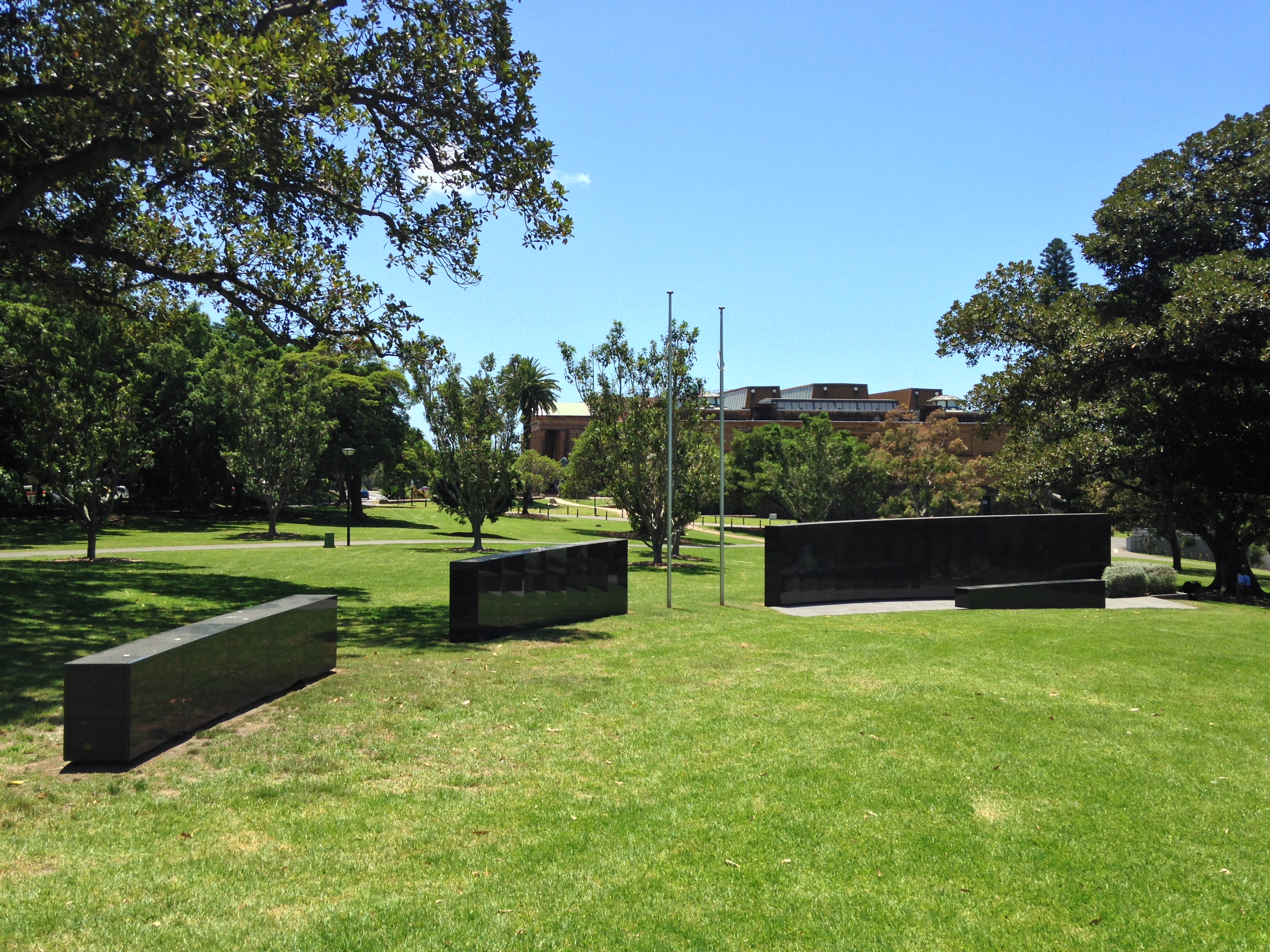
NSW Police Memorial, Art Gallery behind

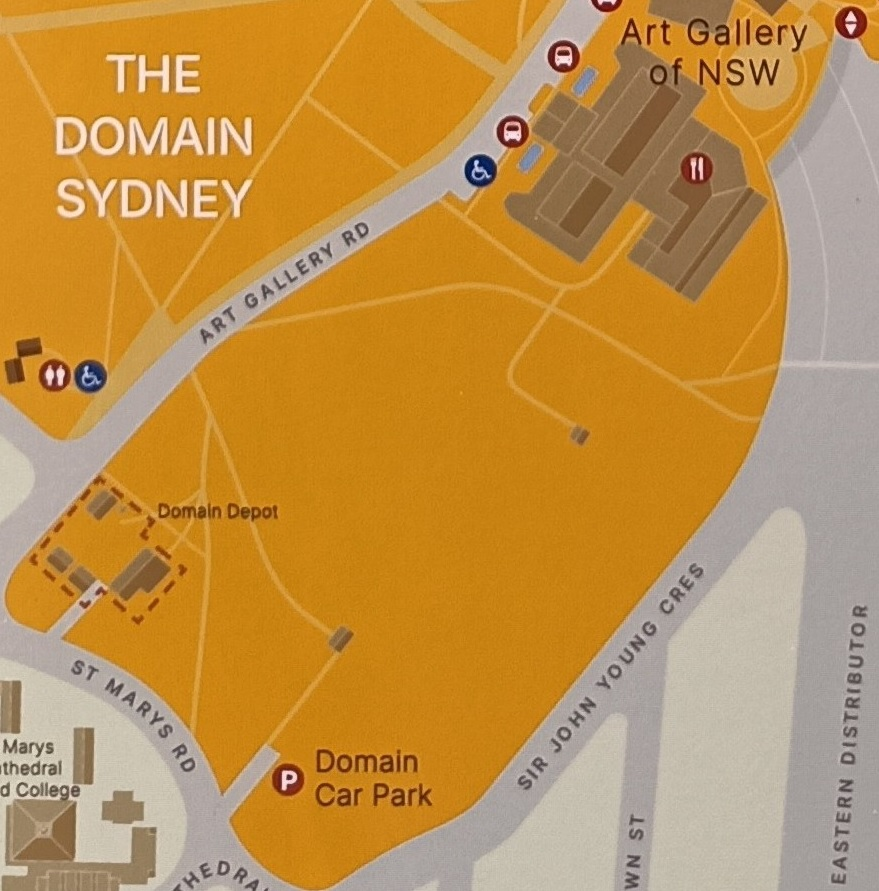
Crescent precinct

=== North-east: Yurong Precinct and Mrs Macquarie's Point ===
North of the Art Gallery of New South Wales, Art Gallery Road passes over the Cahill Expressway, with a narrow section of parkland built over the expressway connecting the Crescent Precinct with the "Yurong Precinct" at Mrs Macquaries Point. In this section, the Domain is a narrow section of greenery bounded by the Royal Botanic Gardens to the west of the roadway and the waters of Woolloomooloo Bay to the east. To the north, the Domain occupies the entirety of the peninsula of Mrs Macquarie's Point, with Farm Cove to the west and Woolloomooloo Bay to the east. Offering the iconic view of the Sydney Opera House alongside the Sydney Harbour Bridge, Mrs Macquarie's Point is a popular destination for tourists and photographers.

Mrs Macquarie's Chair was carved out of the rock for Governor Lachlan Macquarie's wife, so she could sit and observe the passing ships. Above the chair is an inscription recording the completion of Mrs Macquaries Road on 13 June 1816.

The Fleet Steps link Farm Cove to Mrs Macquarie Road. It is named after the Great White Fleet of the US Navy, and was built for the visit of that fleet to Sydney in 1908. It is the point where Queen Elizabeth II first set foot on Australian soil, and a commemorative wall plaque marks the event. The site is often used for large marquee functions, with views of the Opera House and Harbour Bridge.

The Andrew "Boy" Charlton Pool is an outdoor swimming facility beside Wolloomooloo Bay. Veil of Trees is a sculpture of illuminated glass panels installed between the Andrew (Boy) Charlton Pool and the "Lion Gate Lodge" of the Royal Botanic Gardens in 1999.

The iconic view from Mrs Macquarie's Point taken before the fireworks on New Years Eve 2004.

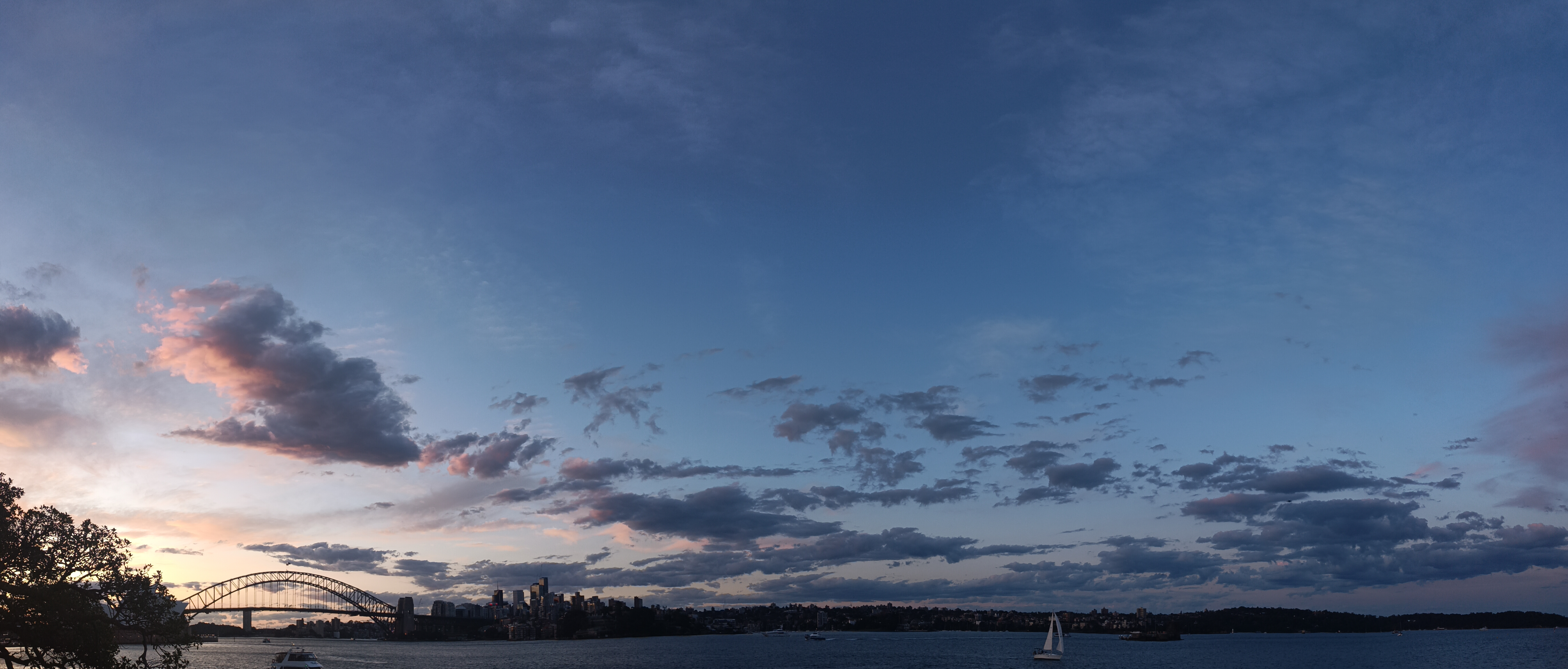
A view of Sydney Harbour. 2024

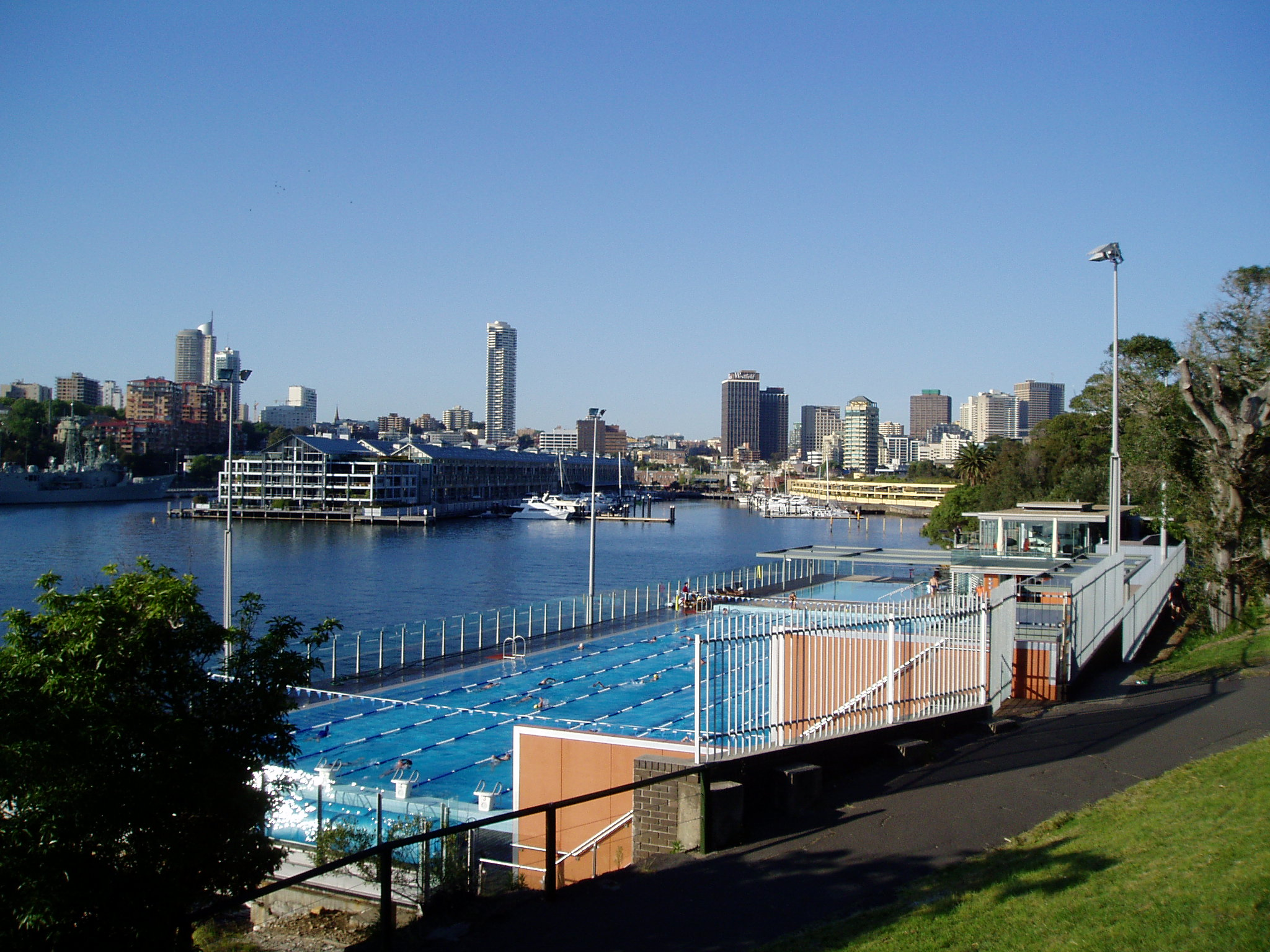
Andrew (Boy) Charlton Pool and Woolloomooloo Bay on the eastern side of the Yurong precinct. 2007

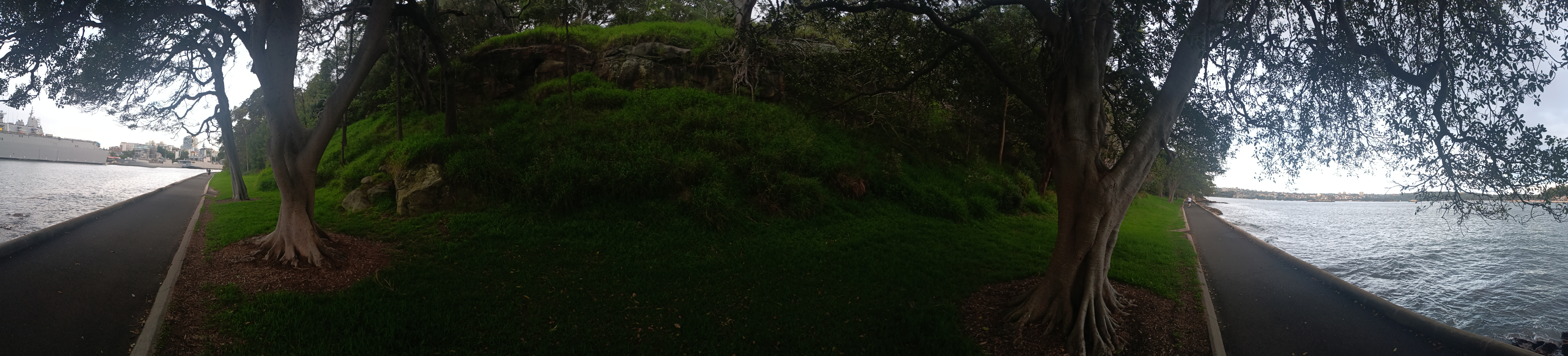
Trail running along the water at Woolloomooloo Bay. 2026

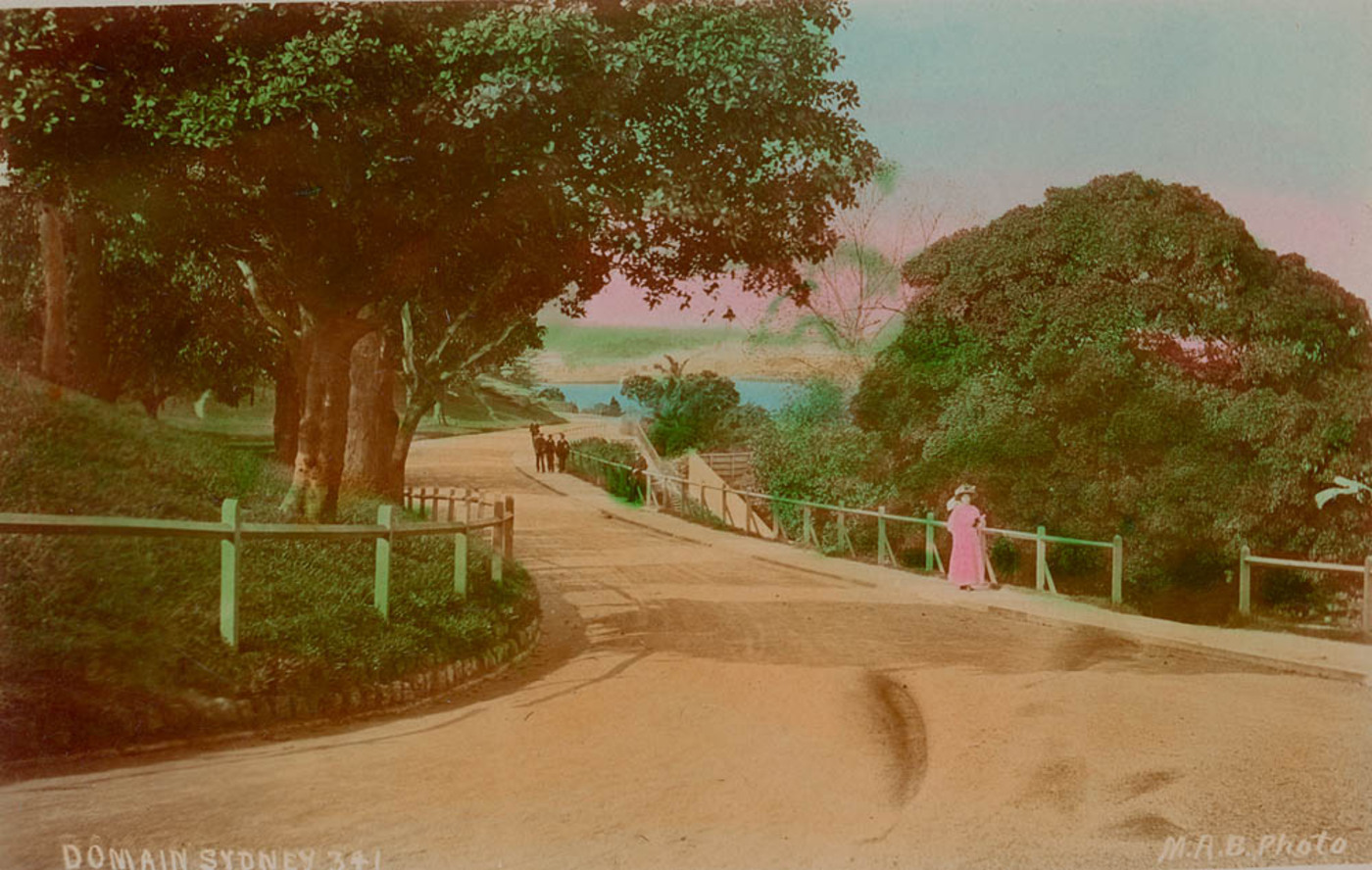
The road to Mrs Macquarie's Point c. 1900-1927

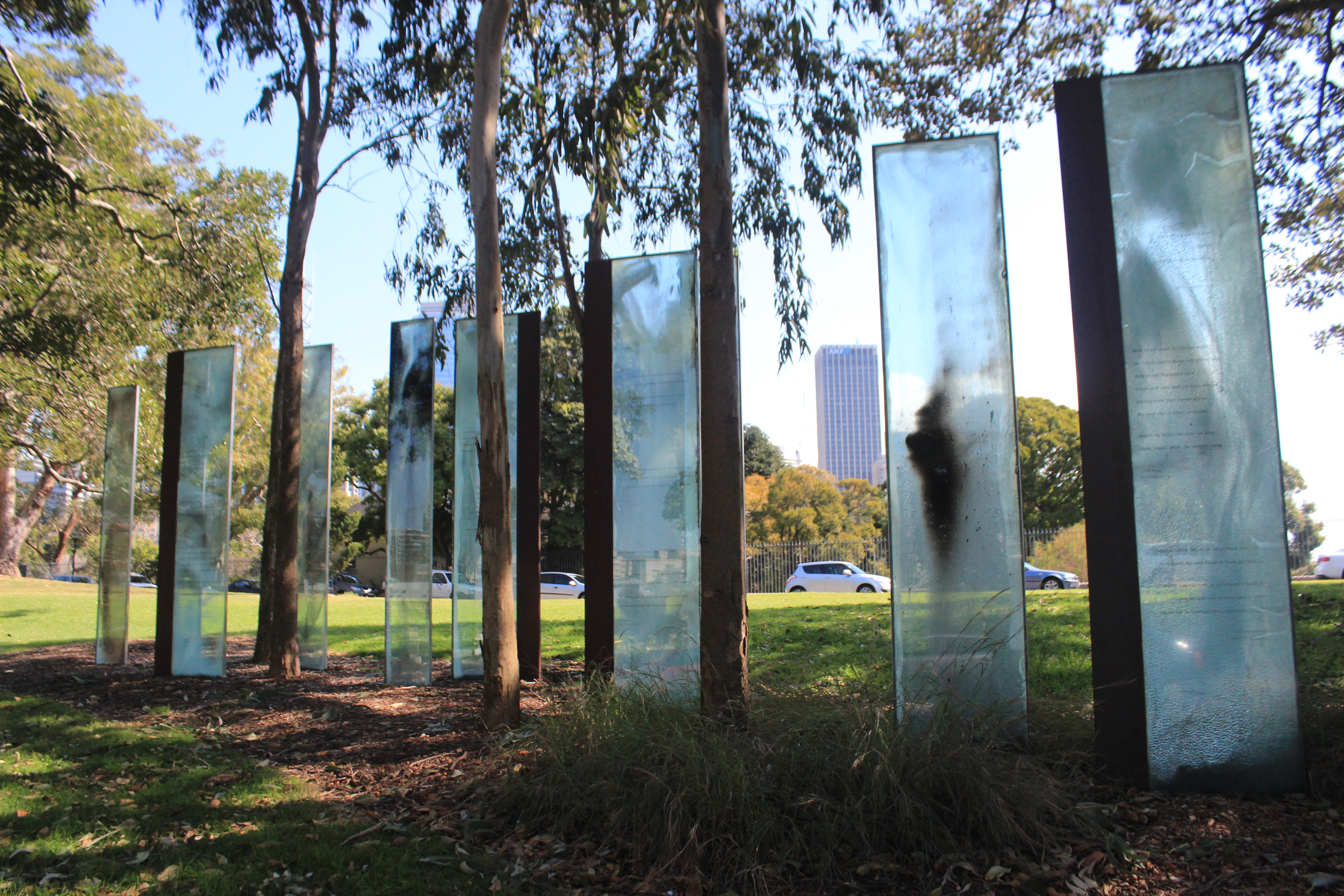
Veil of Trees sculpture. 2015

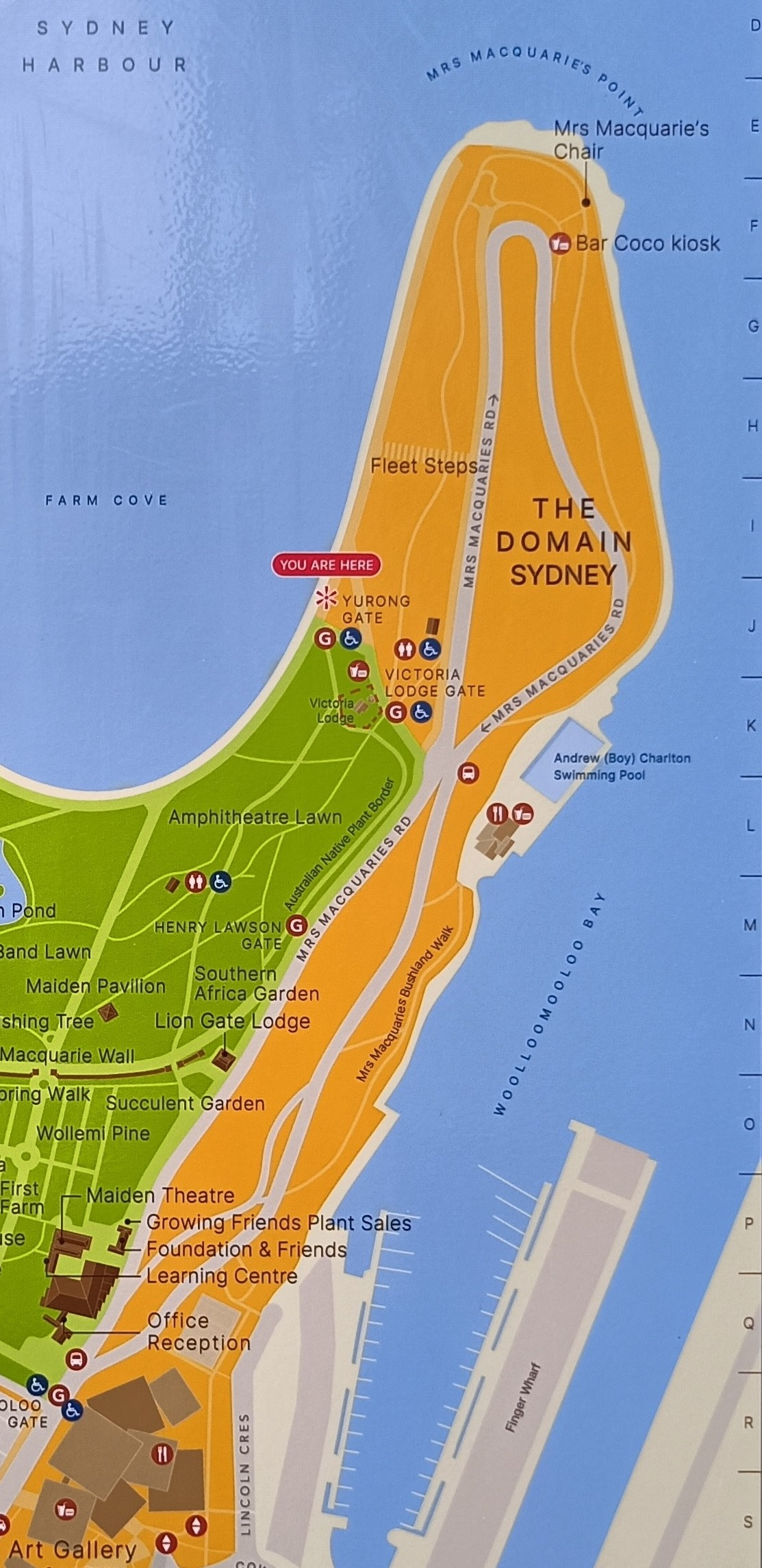
Yurong Precinct

=== North-west: Tarpeian Precinct ===
Cut off from the rest of the Domain by the Cahill Expressway, a narrow strip of open parkland runs alongside the eastern side of Macquarie Street and the western boundary of the Royal Botanic Gardens, rising towards the north to encompass the elevated area near Bennelong Point, which overlooks the forecourt of the Sydney Opera House via a rocky escarpment. This area is named the "Tarpeian Precinct", after the resemblance of the escarpment to the Tarpeian Rock. This relatively small elevated green space dotted with large trees has views from above to parts of Circular Quay, the Harbour Bridge and the Opera House. Government House is immediately to the south-east of this area. The historical sightlines from the Tarpeian Precinct to Circular Quay and beyond were significantly disrupted by the construction of the Bennelong Apartments.

Historically, part of this precinct (formerly the Inner Domain) was in 1869 used as a playing oval for two football games between Sydney University students and the crew of HMS Rosario which was anchored at Farm Cove. In 1870 members of the newly formed Wallaroo Football Club (rugby union) used the area as a training field. The western portion of this open space survives today as the narrow sliver of parkland situated directly across from 89 to 119 Macquarie Street, with the remainder replaced by the opening cut roadway section of the southern entry of the Cahill Expressway.

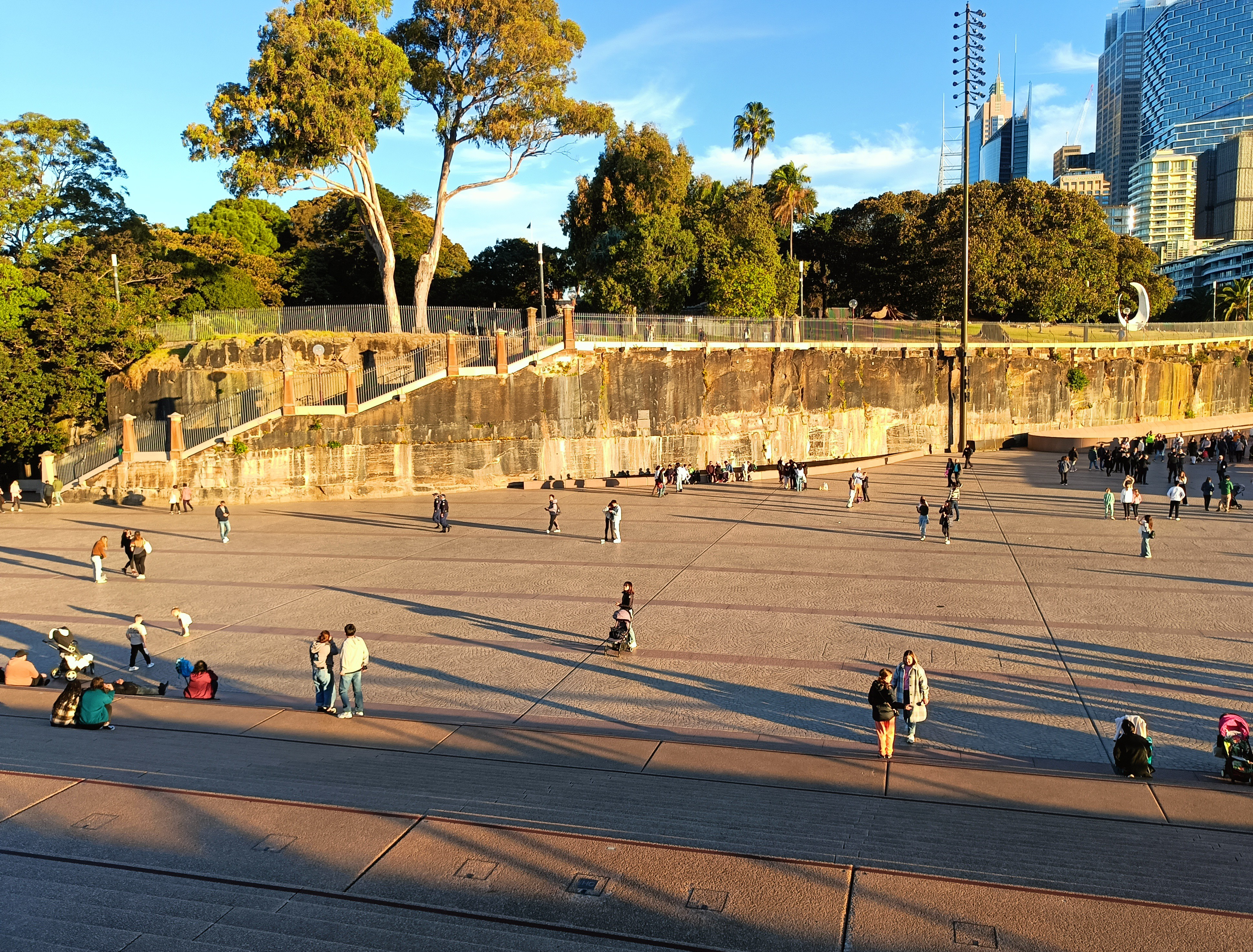
Steps leading up to the Domain.

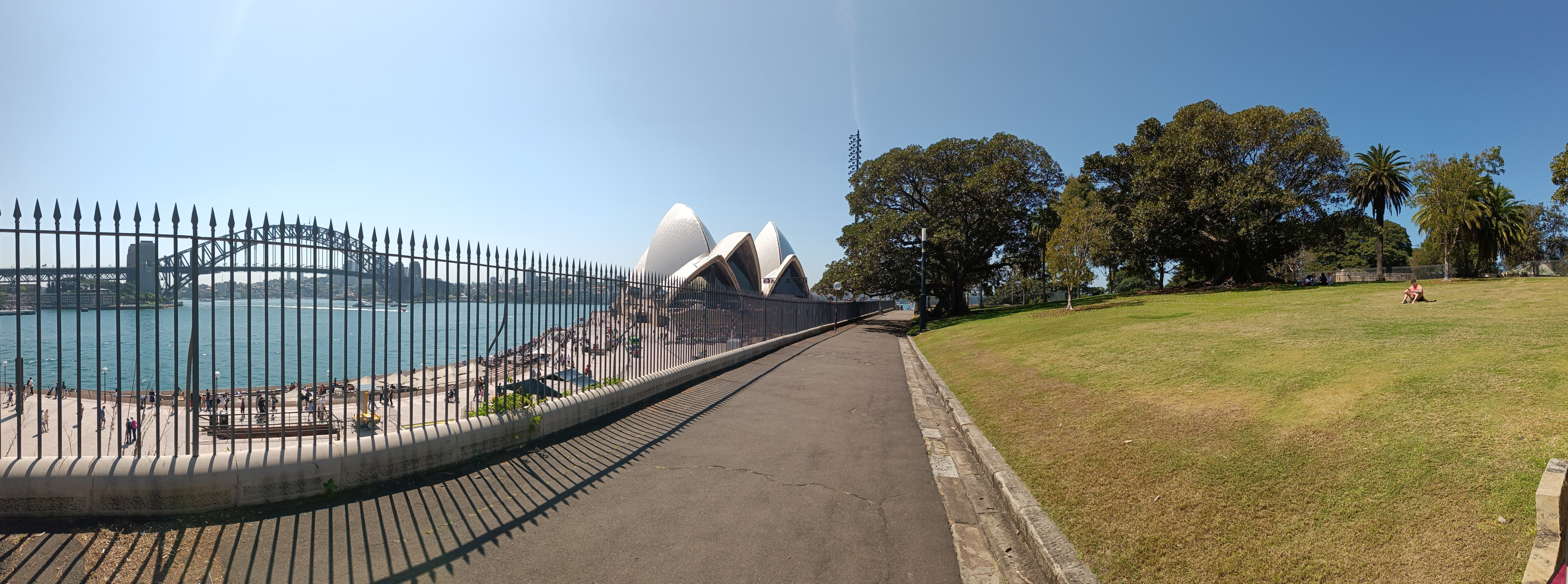
A view of Sydney Harbour from the Domain. September 2023

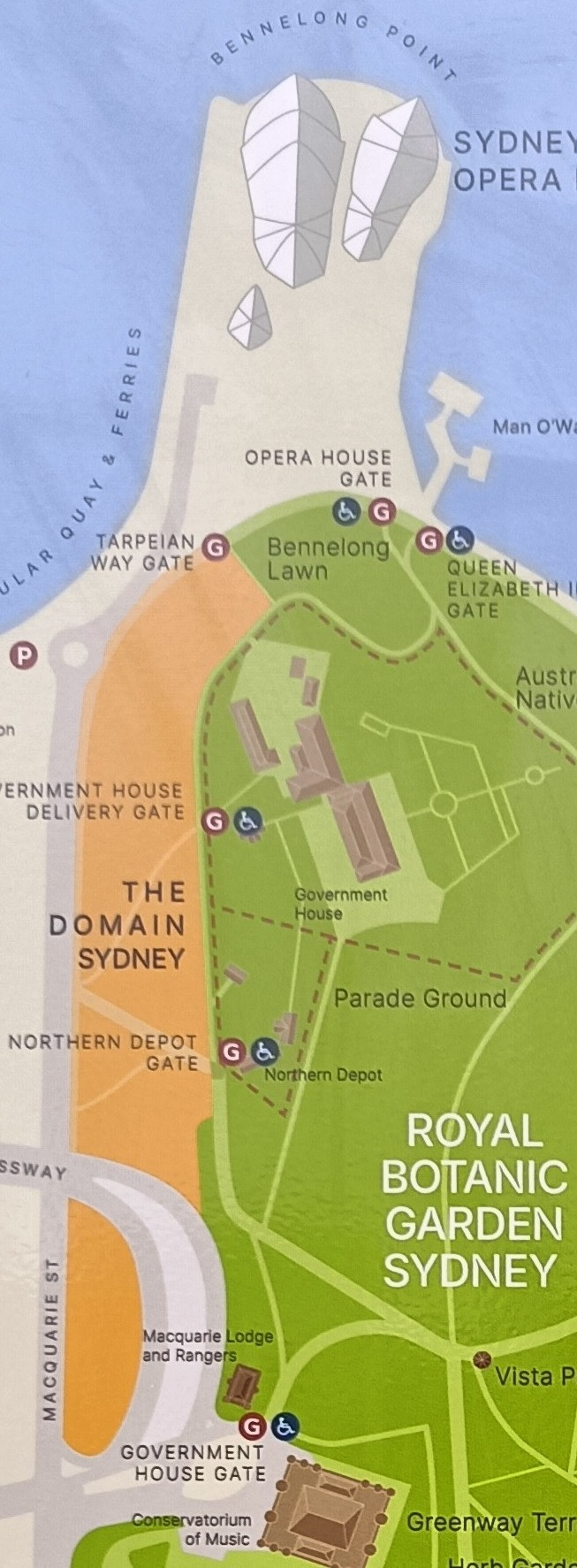
Tarpeian precinct

== Events ==
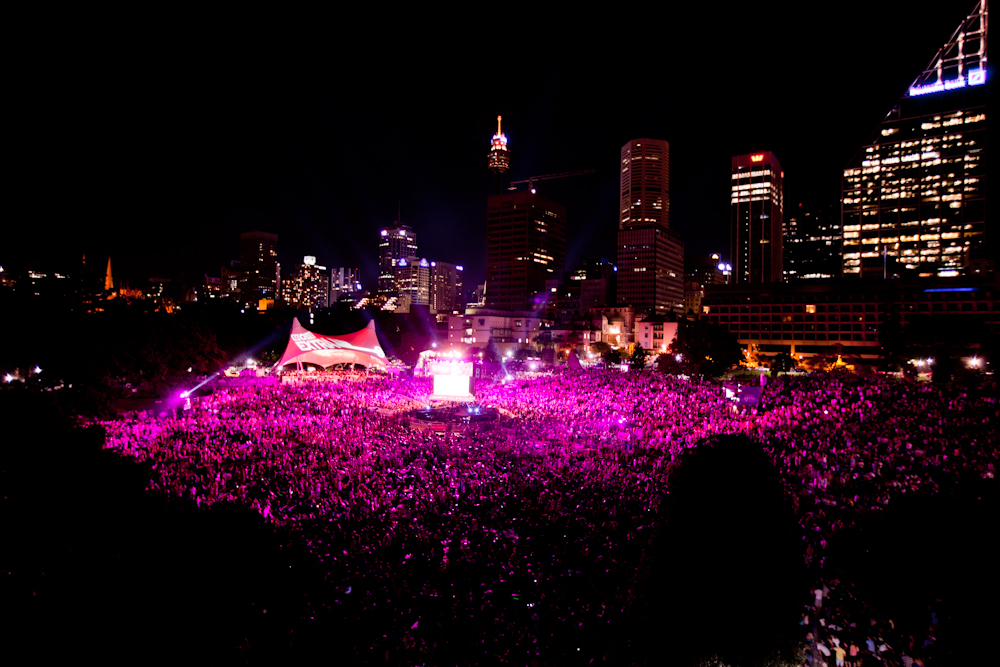
The Domain's open grass area filled with spectators at night during the Tropfest short film festival. (2011)

A number of major events are hosted every year in the Domain, mostly during the Summer holiday months of December and January and many as part of the Sydney Festival. These large events occur in the Phillip precinct where a temporary covered stage is erected every November for the summer festival season.

Some of the more popular and long-running annual events that have become Sydney 'traditions' include the nationally televised Carols in the Domain (held on the evening of the last Saturday before Christmas) and the Sydney Festival trio of Symphony in The Domain (featuring the Sydney Symphony Orchestra), Jazz in the Domain and Opera in The Domain (featuring Opera Australia), held on consecutive Saturday evenings in January. The Tropfest short film festival was held in the Domain each February from 1999 until 2013, when it outgrew the Domain and moved four kilometres south-east to the much larger Centennial Park.

An 'Open Air Cinema' operates in the summer months near the Fleet Steps. The movie screen sits on pylons in the water at Farm Cove with the audience seated along the foreshore, facing directly towards the Opera House and Harbour Bridge. The screen lies horizontally above the water of Farm Cove to allow patrons to enjoy the views before the movie begins and then lifts to the vertical position for the movie screening.

The Fleet Steps are used since 2012 for annual outdoor opera stagings at the Handa Opera on Sydney Harbour, during the months of March and April.

== Heritage listing ==
The Royal Botanic Gardens and The Domain were listed on the New South Wales State Heritage Register on 2 April 1999. As at 22 September 1998, The Royal Botanic Gardens and The Domain collectively are of exceptional national, state and local significance as:

=== General values ===
- It is one of the earliest surviving colonial botanic gardens in the world and one of the oldest, richest and most extensive early public cultural landscapes in Australia with a substantially intact area and major precincts that are nationally rare from a historic, scientific, aesthetic and social perspective, and which continue to fulfil diverse use expectations by remaining freely accessible and in high demand from a broad community spectrum;
- As it contains three of the most important collections for botanical science in Australia notable for their rarity, diversity, size and scientific value – its living collection which is distinguished by many rare and unusual cultivated plants, the extensive preserved collections of the Herbarium and comprehensive botanical library (scientific/technical and research values);
- Additionally The Domain is of historical and aesthetic value on a national level for its ability to demonstrate its dual role as the prime example of a pleasure ground attached to Government House and as a leading example of a public park developed from the mid 19th century as an early designated landscape for public use (1831) the site was at the forefront of international concerns for the integration of public parks within city planning and development.

=== Primary values ===
- As an important and integral part of the boundaries – from 1792 – of the first permanent European settlement in Australia. It is also an integral part of a large group of early Australian colonial sites located along, and linked by, Macquarie Street, including the largest surviving group of Governor Macquarie-era places in Australia. Individually and collectively these sites have considerable potential to reveal much about the formative town planning, settlement and development pattern of the City of Sydney (historic and technical/research values);
- It contains one of the earliest established botanic gardens in the southern hemisphere (1816); the whole site comprises a broad and idiosyncratic collection of native and exotic plants (8000 taxa and 45,000 accessions) acquired over a period of 190 years for the purpose of scientific study including research for agriculture, ornamental horticulture and industry (scientific/technical/research and historic values);
- It contains three of the most valuable assets to botanical science in Australia – its living collection which is distinguished by many rare and unusual cultivated plants, the preserved collections of the herbarium and the RBG library archives (scientific/technical/research and historic values);
- It continues, uninterrupted, a close and direct link with the study, classification and cultivation of the indigenous vegetation of NSW from the time of Charles Fraser (1817) and remaining a core function of the institution and landscape (scientific/technical/research and historic values);
- The place has strong and direct associations with many notable early botanical explorers and collectors such as William Paterson, John Carne Bidwill, Ludwig Leichhardt and John Richardson; and with their important plant acquisitions still extant in the living and preserved collections (scientific/technical/research and historic values);
- It has strong and direct associations with various prominent early directors such as Charles Fraser, Richard and Allan Cunningham, Charles Moore and Joseph Maiden – who were largely responsible for the present overall form of the landscape as well as the content and organisation of the plant collections (scientific/technical/research and historic values);
- It has strong and direct associations with many distinguished 20th century scientists – such as Dr Darnell-Smith, Knowles Mair, Robert Anderson and Dr Lawrence Johnson – whose research, using the living and preserved collections of the place and building on the work of the 19th century RBG botanists, forms the basis of contemporary knowledge and understanding of Australian plants. The collections remain an important basis for contemporary research in systematic and horticultural botany and plant ecology by various Australian and international scientists (scientific/technical/research and historic values);
- It is closely associated with the history and development of the principal government residences – as well as the Governors – of New South Wales; and it remains an integral part of the historical and visual landscape of Government House and of the archaeological remains of the First Government House (scientific/technical/research and historic values);
- It is a nationally important representative example of a largely intact high-Victorian/Edwardian subtropical Gardenesque landscape design – retaining elements of the earlier Macquarie-era "estate park" – with the capacity to indicate evolving landscape design styles in Australia over the past 200 years (historic & aesthetic values);
- It retains many important components of the various phases of its layout – including paths, fences, bedding areas, plantations, views, monuments, statuary, fountains, walling, steps, other landscape furnishings and gate houses – that give the landscape its distinctive visual and botanical character (historic, aesthetic & technical/research values);
- Both the overall place as well as particular areas within it are highly valued by the community – for strong personal associations and memories, and for providing a sense of identity and continuity of use. The place has been, and continues to be, the focus of important historic events in the cultural and political life of New South Wales (social & historic values);
- It fulfils an important role as a part of the quintessential setting for nearby architectural landmarks such as the Sydney Opera House, St Mary's Cathedral and Aurora Place – all having, individually, exceptional aesthetic value. The Tarpeian Rock is a prominent, dramatic and significant sandstone cliff landscape feature of the Domain facing Bennelong Point and the Sydney Opera House, cut for the extension of Macquarie Street and an example of 19th century romanticism (aesthetic value);
- It is an integral part of Sydney's scenic harbour landscape (aesthetic value);
- It remains a potent source of inspiration for artists and writers since the inception of the colony; and as a setting for public art (historic, aesthetic & social values);
- Despite various interventions over the last 200 years it is still possible to appreciate the basic form of the pre-European landscape – the two ridged promontories enclosing the central gully (aesthetic value);
- The place demonstrates changing fashions in horticulture, garden design and ornament, and the practice of botany through its landscape and architectural design and art as it has continued to be developed, reshaped and embellished by successive directors and overseers (historic & aesthetic values);
- The trialling of various plant species – for example Canary Island date palms (Phoenix canariensis), brush box (Lophostemon confertus) and Hill's fig (Ficus microcarpa var. Hillii) – within the place has subsequently influenced their popularity and use throughout Sydney and beyond (scientific/technical/research and aesthetic values);
- As a landscape it has also been the setting for earlier important structures such as the Exhibition Palace, Fort Macquarie, the Crimean War period fortifications, the temporary Federation pavilion and for which some archaeological evidence may remain (scientific/technical/research values); and
- From an early date the place developed, and continues to develop, a didactic role of increasing knowledge and understanding about plants through displays, public lectures, tours and social events based on the living collections and the landscape setting (social value).

=== The Domain ===
The Domain is individually of exceptional value to Australia, NSW and Sydney:

- As an important and integral part of the boundaries, from 1792, of the first permanent European settlement in Australia. It is also an integral part of a large group of early Australian colonial sites located along, and linked by, Macquarie Street including the largest surviving group of Governor Macquarie-era places in Australia. Individually and collectively these sites have considerable potential to reveal much about the formative town planning, settlement and development pattern of the City of Sydney (historic value);
- For its close association with the development of the Royal Botanic Garden and of botanical study in Australia, as the location of early (1788) agricultural, botanical and horticultural enterprise and, since 1848, through the joint management of the Domain and Gardens under one directorship (historic value);
- As a notable venue in the landscape of public protest, both collective and individual, as a place of assembly for the demonstration of concern, opposition and disquiet and in particular, to challenge Government policy and authority (historic and social value);
- As the home, from the 1870s, of the Domain orators – synonymous with free speech, a platform for a vibrant tradition of public speaking of all creeds, beliefs, life styles and political persuasions in the tradition of London's Hyde Park corner (historic & social value);
- As evidence of the erosion and alienation of public space under pressure of urban development and of dominance of transport issues in the history of planning in Sydney and a focus for debate concerning the value of public space and the rights of citizens; and
- For its association with sporting history in Australia, as a venue for a wide range of sporting activities including the provision of sports facilities for city workers and firms' teams, the home of first class cricket in NSW from 1857 to 1871, the first public playground (gymnasium) and, in 1846, as the venue for the first swimming championship known to have been held in Australia. It is also the site of the first formalised swimming in Sydney – an activity that continues there (historic & social value).

=== Historical significance ===
The Royal Botanic Gardens and The Domain also have exceptional historical significance as:

- The second oldest Botanic gardens in the southern hemisphere (officially established in 1816), Rio de Janeiro being the oldest;
- The site of the first attempts at agriculture in the colony in 1788 and a rare example on a world scale where a modern nation's first attempts at feeding itself can be traced and seen;
- The site of Governor Phillip's farm within the middle garden, still evident in the way the axes of the current beds and paths follow the original furrows;
- A core remnant of Governor Phillip's original Government/Governor's Domain (1792);
- An important part of Governor Macquarie's plan for Sydney;
- The first extensive open space designated in Sydney, and representative of a small group of early 19th century public spaces in Sydney;
- A site of early public recreation since 1831, in continuous public use since;
- Evidence of remnant native vegetation remaining from the time of white settlement of the Sydney area.
- Retention of many important structures and memorials from early Colonial times when the gardens formed part of the original Governor's Domain (such as the c.1812 Macquarie wall and gateway, Mrs Macquarie's Road, fountains, statues, gates, a varied collection of buildings both public (e.g.: herbarium) and private (e.g.; Victoria Lodge gate house, Superintendent's residence/Cunningham Building, Old Herbarium/Anderson Building));
- A beautiful and varied collection of plants, statuary, fountains, monuments, and structures representative of Victorian cultural attainments and garden embellishments;
- Demonstrating a very early example of providing public access to open space or parkland (1831 cf 1850s in England);
- Their being the site of the first zoo in Australia;
- Their being the site of the 1878 International Exhibition, and Garden Palace, a major event for Sydney and the first such exhibition in Australia, featuring works of art and industry.

=== Associations ===
The Gardens and The Domain demonstrate strong or special associations with the life and works of persons, groups of persons of importance in NSW's cultural and natural history, including:

- Their association with the work and influence of key figures in the European scientific world such as Sir Joseph Banks, Sir William Hooker and Joseph Dalton Hooker at Kew Gardens, London;
- Their association with the life and works of past Domain overseers, including David Wilson, August Kloster and James Jones, many of whom made significant contributions to the development of the Domain and other public areas in Sydney designed by the Directors of the Botanic Gardens and their staff;
- For their rich heritage of memorials as elements of urban design, including The Domain's Henry Kendall memorial seat, the Palace Garden Gates and wall, the Cunningham memorial island and obelisk, the monument to the forces of the Desert Mounted Corps wall, the Captain Arthur Phillip fountain monument and the sunken garden memorial to the Pioneers.

=== Aesthetic significance ===
The Gardens and The Domain have aesthetic significance for the following reasons:

- As a palimpsest of one hundred and fifty years of Colonial and Victorian garden design with some very fine late 19th century landscaping;
- For demonstrating a mixture of early 19th century garden design styles with Colonial style geometric beds in the middle garden and picturesque romantic style features such as serpentine paths and island beds in the other areas;
- Their design as a public pleasure garden, containing many enclosed scenes enhanced with decorative foliage and water forms and providing many enframed views across the harbour;
- For the public role key Directors such as Moore and Maiden played in propagating and promoting rainforest tree and palm species and good design in garden making in the planting of public streets, parks and institutional grounds around NSW;
- Their continuing educational role in demonstrating high standards of ornamental horticulture to the public;
- As an important major defining landscape and recreational asset of Sydney;
- For The Domain's role as a contributing and defining element providing continuity in the series of public parklands extending from Hyde Park to the Royal Botanic Gardens, important in the open space network of the City of Sydney;
- Because of the reciprocal visual relationship between the Gardens and Domain and the historic buildings group along Macquarie Street, Hospital Road and St. Mary's Cathedral. These buildings are part of the setting of the Gardens and Domain, and the Gardens and Domain in turn form a parkland backdrop setting for these buildings, which is appreciated by their users and the public;
- For including a number of individually significant structures of high aesthetic value such as the Art Gallery of NSW, the Domain Lodge and a group of statues and memorials including the Robert Burns statue;
- For their rich tradition of gently curving walls, including the two Macquarie walls, the Farm Cove sea wall, the Woolloomooloo gates and wall, the Government House western terrace walls and the walls that originally contained The Domain.

=== Scientific significance ===
The Gardens and The Domain have scientific significance as:

- Australia's oldest scientific institution (1816);
- Continuing centre for scientific research, particularly in systematic taxonomic botany;
- Historic centre for economic botany and experimental horticulture, being a key place for exportation of Australian native plants (most active period of exporting to Europe was up until 1820), and for the importation, acclimatisation, propagation and dispersal of plants establishing many of Australia's horticultural and agricultural industries, such as the wine and olive industries and experimenting with many others (opium poppies, eucalypt oil distillation);
- Their demonstration of the extensive international colonial exchange network of botanic gardens in promoting plant exploration, discovery, taxonomy, propagation, dispersal and cultivation;
- Their association with the work and influence of key figures in the European scientific world such as Sir Joseph Banks, Sir William Hooker and Joseph Dalton Hooker at Kew Gardens, London;
- Their association with the work and influence of key figures in Australian botany such as Alan Cunningham, Charles Fraser, John Carne Bidwill, Charles Moore, Joseph Maiden;
- Their rich (c110 species) and early (1860s) collection of temperate and subtropical climate palms, considered one of the finest in the world;
- Their fine collection of trees from the South Pacific and other Pacific regions, including of the family Araucariaceae (e.g.: the genera Araucaria and Agathis) and figs (the genus Ficus).

=== Social significance ===
The Gardens and The Domain have social significance for the following reasons:

- They demonstrate a very early example of providing public access to open space or parkland (1831 cf 1850s in England);
- Their long and continuing role in providing pleasure, edification and interest to the public while at the same time representing key social values such as law, order and social status;
- Their recreational use by the community over a long period and the domain which has traditionally been the centre for political and religious discussion and meetings and continues to provide venues for large public gatherings and entertainment;
- Their being the site of the first zoo in Australia (1860 aviary);
- Their being the site of the 1878 International Exhibition, and Garden Palace, a major event for Sydney and the first such exhibition in Australia, featuring works of art and industry;
- Their continuing role in public education through lectures, demonstration plantings etc. on the value and diversity of plants, their beauty, range, uses and cultivation, and more recently on nature conservation and biodiversity issues;
- Their continuing educational role in demonstrating high standards of ornamental horticulture to the public;
- As a significant site for political and religious discussion and meetings, democratic debate and the expression of dissent, in the Domain;
- As demonstration of the importance placed upon accessible and inalienable public space in Sydney, which dates back to the 1830s;
- As a habitat to a threatened fauna species, the grey headed flying fox (bat).

=== Archaeological significance ===
The Gardens and The Domain are identified in the Archaeological Zoning Plan for Central Sydney as an Area of Archaeological Potential, with the potential to yield information that will contribute to an understanding of NSW's cultural or natural history. It is an area potentially rich in archaeological remains, dating from Aboriginal occupation and the earliest years of the establishment of the colony.

The Domain Oil Tanks

The Domain oil tanks are:

1. a relic of the various construction activities associated with the war effort and with the operation of Garden Island as the headquarters of the Australian Navy (criterion (a) historic);
2. associated with the Department of Defence and its operations during World War 2 (criterion (b) association);
3. demonstrative of mass and reinforced concrete construction methods developed by the Metropolitan Water & Sewerage & Drainage Board (MWS & DB) for water (and other liquid) storage purposes in the early 20th century (criterion (e) technical/research);
4. the only example in Sydney of underground wartime fuel storage tanks (criterion (f) rarity); and
5. representative of tanks constructed by the MWS & DB for the storage of fluids in the early 20th century and reflect the then latest development of a construction design dating from the mid 19th century (criterion (g) representative).

The Tarpeian Way

The Tarpeian Way is of State significance for its prominence as a quarried, weathered sandstone cliff face, with stone steps and iron railing, which defines the northern boundary of the Royal Botanic Gardens and the southern boundary of the Sydney Opera House. The drama, scale and simplicity of the quarried sandstone face of theTarpeian Wall plays a crucial role in supporting the entry point and setting of the Sydney Opera House, where it provides an enclosing "backstage wall" to the open forecourt space. It is considered a "crucial element in [the World Heritage] Buffer Zone . . . including its steps and upper perimeter fence. Although not legally on the Sydney Opera House site, it immediately borders and defines its southern edge and the open space of the forecourt. Because of its scale, location and configuration, it plays a crucial role in the approach and entry experience, setting, and definition, of the Sydney Opera House site." A substantial rock cutting of the Bennelong Headland, undertaken in 1880 at a cost of £6,000, it enabled the extension of Macquarie Street. 'Its vertical quarried sandstone face, with its steps and fence, is an historic artefact in its own right and retains the only visible evidence of activities on the Sydney Opera House site predating the Opera House itself.' Its traces of anti-Vietnam War graffiti dating from the 1970s are of State significance as a remnant of an important Australian social movement in a major public space. The Tarpeian Way is of local significance for its associations with politicians and bureaucrats who authorised and undertook the cutting in 1880 including Sydney Alderman C. Moore, J. S. Farnell, then Minister for Lands, E. Bradridge, City Surveyor and Mr. Moriarty, the Engineer for Harbours and Rivers. The Tarpeian Way has an unusually dramatic, classical association through its name with the famous rock in Rome from which prisoners were hurled to their deaths in ancient times. The Tarpeian Way is of State social significance for the high regard in which it is held as a dramatic backdrop to the forecourt space of the Sydney Opera House, and as an access point between the Sydney Opera House and the royal Botanic Gardens. It is often used by members of the public enjoying its marvellous views of the Sydney Opera House and harbour setting.

== See also ==
- Parks in Sydney
- Royal Botanic Gardens, Sydney
- Centennial Park
- Geography of Sydney
