= Clifton Hill Community Music Centre =

Former music and performance art venue in Melbourne, Australia

The Clifton Hill Community Music Centre (CHCMC), also known as the Organ Factory, was an artist-run music and performance art space in Clifton Hill, a suburb of Melbourne, Victoria, Australia. Located in a 19th-century factory used to construct the grand organ in the Melbourne Town Hall, it was co-founded in 1976 by composers Warren Burt and Ron Nagorcka, and ran concerts on a near-weekly basis until 1983. It closed the following year.

The CHCMC was guided by anarchist principles, with no money being charged of audience members or supplied to performers, and no restrictions on access to the space. This alternative set of values fostered a highly eclectic and experimental scene involving "a strange mix of Melbourne intelligentsia, music academics, and precocious post-punks". Bands that frequently performed at the CHCMC include Tsk Tsk Tsk and Essendon Airport, co-founded by Philip Brophy and David Chesworth, respectively. In 1979, the pair established both the magazine New Music and the record label Innocent Records as a means of documenting the CHCMC scene. Other CHCMC regulars included composers Paul Schütze and Ernie Althoff as well as art critic Paul Taylor, whose journal Art & Text served as an outlet for critical post-structuralist discussion of CHCMC performances.

Today the CHCMC is "one of the better-documented scenes in Australian experimental music history", and is regarded as both "an important place in the history of new music in Australia" and "a significant site for the development of Australian cultural postmodernism".

== History ==
The Clifton Hill Community Music Centre (CHCMC) was co-founded in 1976 by composers Warren Burt and Ron Nagorcka. Around this time, experimental music began to find institutional support in Melbourne, particularly at La Trobe University, which under composer Keith Humble established a progressive experimental music department in 1975 with the American-born Burt and others teaching its classes. Earlier, Nagorcka had initiated innovative projects such as the New Improvisers Action Group for Gnostic and Rhythmic Awareness (NIAGGRA) at La Mama Theatre (1972–74) and co-founded the New Music Centre (NMC), a hub for contemporary and electronic musicians. During a stint at the University of California in the United States, Nagorcka collaborated with Burt presenting performances at a university venue called the Atomic Cafe. Their experiences from these ventures inspired them to establish the principles for what would become the CHCMC: no entry fees or performer payments, open access for all types of performances, and an anarchic, non-hierarchical structure. Upon founding the Centre, Nagorcka and Burt soon handed over coordination to young Latrobe student composer David Chesworth, who organised concert series between 1978 and 1982. Coordination was subsequently handled by Andrew Preston in 1982–83 and Robert Goodge in 1983–84. The coordinator handled scheduling, building access, and basic publicity, with minimal equipment and promotion provided. The CHCMC found a home in a disused factory in inner suburban Clifton Hill. Built in the 1880s, it was used to construct the grand organ in the Melbourne Town Hall.

The CHCMC, through its "anyone can do it" ethos, nurtured many young Australian composers, including Paul Schütze, Ernie Althoff, Ros Bandt, David Brown, and Rik Rue. A number of regulars at the CHCMC had worked in more mainstream and commercial music, such as Les Gilbert of the psychedelic rock band Wild Cherries. Among the international composers who performed there were Englishman Trevor Wishart, New Zealander David Watson, and Americans Bill Fontana and David Dunn. CHCMC performances were often multimedia in nature, incorporating cheap electronics and readymade materials in ways that dissolved boundaries of music, video art, performance art and installation art. "Post-Cagean" composers associated with La Trobe's music department, such as John Crawford and Warren Burt, drew on modernist inspired counter-culture methods when creating pieces for the CHCMC. A younger generation of acts, including post-punk bands Tsk Tsk Tsk (co-founded by Philip Brophy) and Essendon Airport (co-founded by David Chesworth), developed a minimalist and consciously kitsch take on popular music "drawing attention to the spectacle of culture, to culture as spectacle, its disguised modes of construction, assumptions and concealed meanings." This distinguished the Clifton Hill scene from other post-punk scenes in Melbourne, including the Little Band scene, based in nearby Fitzroy. According to John Murphy, the Little Band scene was "in some ways very anti" what the "Clifton Hill mob" were doing: "Philip Brophy was very against emotion in music, while the little bands thing was meant to be wild and chaotic". St Kilda's Crystal Ballroom scene, although more rock-orientated, proved receptive, with CHCMC acts playing there on occasion.

Between 1978 and 1980, activities at the CHCMC were documented in its own quarterly magazine, New Music, co-founded by Brophy and Chesworth. The magazine invited any person, regardless of background, to submit a review of a CHCMC performance they had seen, which the performer would then respond to in an interview with the reviewer. New Music published each review and a transcript of its follow-up interview side by side. In 1979, Brophy and Chesworth founded Innocent Records, which became a platform for releasing CHCMC compilations as well as albums, EPs, and singles from their own bands and other CHCMC-connected projects. After Sydney group Severed Heads performed at the CHCMC, key member Tom Ellard included many CHCMC performers on One Stop Shopping (1981), a compilation released through his label Terse Tapes. CHCMC recordings also appeared on issues of the cassette magazine Fast Forward (1980–82).

In 1981, members of Tsk Tsk Tsk staged their disco project Asphixiation at the George Paton Gallery, which Althoff identified as "probably the first major acceptance by the visual arts world of [the CHCMC]". Around this time, art critic Paul Taylor, a regular attendee and one-time performer at the CHCMC, emerged as one of its most prominent supporters. His journal Art & Text, founded in 1981, published writing on the CHCMC through the lens of France-based post-structuralist theories. Art & Text also featured written contributions from CHCMC stalwarts, including Chesworth, who later said that the journal "started the process of legitimisation" of their ideas, and that "all of a sudden this output of people ... [Taylor] introduced back into the discourse." Many CHCMC artists were represented in Taylor's landmark exhibition POPISM (1982), held at the National Gallery of Victoria. It helped introduce the work of the CHCMC to a wider audience and sparked the first public debate in Australia about structuralist theories.

The CHCMC hosted Melbourne Fringe Festival events in February and March of 1983, and in early 1984, it was granted funding for the first time by the Victorian Ministry for the Arts. Despite these strides, audience attendance began to decline, as did the presence of regular performers, many of whom were away in Europe as members of the Australian contingent sent to the Festival d'automne à Paris. Also, in June 1983, the Organ Factory closed to undergo extensive renovations, forcing the CHCMC to relocate to a venue in Richmond. The following year in March, it was decided to disband the CHCMC.

== Legacy ==
In a special feature on the CHCMC, published in 2006, England's The Wire wrote that Essendon Airport and Tsk Tsk Tsk, guided by postmodern thought, mounted "a thoroughgoing critique of rock music and its received widsoms", and "broached formal ideas about pop and rock, questioning the shadowplay that goes on within rock discourse". For these reasons, it compared their output with that of projects based in England at the time, such as Scritti Politti, and the group Red Krayola's collaboration with Art & Language. The Wire continued:

... [the CHCMC] at its best offered an 'all channels open' approach to music making. The music, thinking and writing that circulated around the centre simultaneously addressed meta-musical concerns about the place of art and the artist within politics and ideology.

The National Gallery of Victoria has collected CHCMC-related works, and drew on the scene's output in curating the 2013 exhibition Mix Tape 1980s: Appropriation, Subculture, Critical Style. The CHCMC is also represented in the collection of the Melbourne Electronic Sound Studio, which has lent relevant artefacts to the Australian Music Vault. In 2009, the Melbourne International Film Festival screened CHCMC short films and video art as part of the program “Punk Becomes Pop: The Australian Post-Punk Underground”.

In its 2019–20 lecture series Defining Moments: Australian Exhibition Histories 1968–1999, the Australian Centre for Contemporary Art (ACCA) invited guest lecturers to each speak on one of sixteen key events that have shaped Australian art since 1968. Chesworth presented on the CHCMC.

== See also ==
- Postmodern music

== Bibliography ==
- Althoff, Ernie (1989). "The Clifton Hill Community Music Centre: 1976 - 1983". NMA Magazine (7). NMA Publications: 39–44.
- Andrews, Ian (2009). "The Lost Decade: Post-Punk, Experimental and Industrial Electronic Music". In Priest, Gail (ed.). Experimental Music: Audio Explorations in Australia. University of New South Wales Press. pp. 36–56. ISBN 9780230320833.
- Bebbington, Warren Arthur, ed. (1997). The Oxford Companion to Australian Music. Oxford University Press. ISBN 9780195534320.
- Broadstock, Brenton (1995). Sound Ideas: Australian Composers Born Since 1950. Australian Music Centre. ISBN 9780646224978.
- Dale, Jon (2006). "Once Upon a Time in Melbourne". The Wire. No. 272. pp. 32–37.
- Dale, Jonathan (2013). "Clifton Hill Community Music Centre and early music (including Essendon Airport)". In Croggon, Nicholas; Hughes, Helen (eds.). Impresario: Paul Taylor, The Melbourne Years, 1981-1984. Monash University Museum of Art. pp. 36–56. ISBN 9781922099082.
- Dale, Jonathan (2009). "Post-Punk and Vision". Senses of Cinema (52). Senses of Cinema Inc.
- Knowles, Julian (2008). Hood, Anthony; Wilkie, Sonia (eds.). "Liminal Electronic Musics: Post-Punk Experimentation in Australia in the 1970s-1980s". Australasian Computer Music Conference. Sydney Conservatorium of Music: 37–45.
- Kouvaras, Linda Ioanna (2016). Loading the Silence: Australian Sound Art in the Post-Digital Age. Taylor & Francis. ISBN 9781317103837.
- Licht, Alan (2019). Sound Art Revisited. Bloomsbury Publishing. ISBN 9781501333149.
- Nichols, David (2016). Dig: Australian Rock and Pop Music, 1960-85. Verse Chorus Press. ISBN 9781891241611.
- Scott-Maxwell, Aline; Whiteoak, John (2003). Currency Companion to Music and Dance in Australia. Currency House. ISBN 9780958121316.
- Walker, Clinton (1996). Stranded: The Secret History of Australian Independent Music 1977–1991. Pan Macmillan. ISBN 978-0-7329-0883-6.

Theses

- Davis, Jared Victor (2018). Noise to Signal: DIY Music Practice in Melbourne 1976–2016 (PhD). Melbourne, Vic.: Monash University. doi:10.26180/5bce65233951f.
- Fox, Robin (2002). Aspects of experimental music in Melbourne, 1975-1979: focussing on the La Trobe University Music Department and the Clifton Hill Community Music Centre (Masters). Melbourne, Vic.: Monash University.
- Fliedner, Kelly (2016). Circuits, computers, cassettes, correspondence: the Clifton Hill Community Music Centre 1976 - 1984 (Masters). Melbourne, Vic.: University of Melbourne. hdl:11343/123612.
