= Paul Taylor (art critic) =

Australian art critic, born 1957

- Born: 1957; Melbourne
- Died: 7 September 1992 (aged 34–35); Melbourne
- Education: Monash University
- Occupation: Art critic
- Known for: Founder of "Art & Text"

Paul Taylor (1957–7 September 1992) was an Australian art critic, curator, editor and publisher. In 1981, he founded Art & Text, the contemporary art journal considered to be responsible for generating and promoting postmodernist discourse in Australian art.

== Life ==
Taylor was born in 1957 in Melbourne, Australia. He completed a Bachelor of Arts (Hons.) at Monash University, Melbourne in 1979, studying under Patrick McCaughey (founder of the Visual Arts department at Monash University) with fellow students including Jenepher Duncan and Jan Minchin.

In 1981, Taylor founded the contemporary Australian art journal Art & Text. He curated the landmark exhibition 'Popism' in 1982 at the National Gallery of Victoria, Melbourne, and, the following year, the smaller though equally significant 'Tall Poppies' at the University of Melbourne Gallery. In 1984, Taylor edited and published an anthology of criticism titled Anything Goes: Art in Australia 1970–1980. In the same year, Taylor invited Sydney theorist and critic Paul Foss to edit Art & Text when Taylor planned to move to New York. Taylor established himself there as an art journalist, writing for Vanity Fair, Interview, Parkett, Flash Art and The New York Times. In 1988, he curated the exhibition Impresario: Malcolm McLaren and the British New Wave for the New Museum of Contemporary Art in New York. In 1992, Taylor returned to Melbourne, where he died from AIDS-related lymphoma.

In 2012, Taylor was the subject of the symposium Impresario: Paul Taylor, Art & Text POPISM at Monash University. A book, based on the symposium, was published in 2013.

== Art & Text ==
Taylor's journal Art & Text presented a new vision for Australian art that was grounded in the translation, interpretation and application of French poststructuralist theory to contemporary art. In 1983, issue 11 included the first English translation of Jean Baudrillard’s essay "The Precession of Simulacra". Taylor maintained an enduring commitment to the New Wave sub-culture and its subsequent theorisation by sociologists such as Dick Hebdige. Notably influential on Taylor's thinking was Hebdige's book 1979 book, Subculture: The Meaning of Style.

Under Taylor's editorship, Art & Text worked closely with contemporary artists to publish both their writings and their artworks in the form of artist pages. These artists included Imants Tillers, John Nixon, Maria Kozic, Peter Tyndall, Howard Arkley, David Chesworth, Philip Brophy, Juan Davila and Vivienne Shark LeWitt among others.

Following a symposium organised by Monash University's MUMA in September 2012, a plan to produce a book about Taylor was announced. In December 2013, Helen Hughes and Nicholas Croggon released Impresario: Paul Taylor, The Melbourne Years, 1981-1984.

Taylor bequeathed his papers to the National Gallery of Australia Research Library.

== Bibliography ==
- Taylor, Paul. 'Popism', Melbourne, Victoria: National Gallery of Victoria, 1982.
- Taylor, Paul (ed.). Anything Goes: Art in Australia 1970–1980, Melbourne: Art & Text, 1984.
- Taylor, Paul. After Andy: SoHo in the Eighties, Melbourne: Schwartz City, 1995.
- Taylor, Paul. Impresario: Malcolm McLaren and the British New Wave. Cambridge, Massachusetts: MIT Press, 1988. ISBN 978-0-262-70035-1
- Foss, Paul, McKenzie, Rob, Chambers, Ross and Butler, Rex (eds). The & Files: Paul Foss, Art & Text 1981–2002, Brisbane: Institute of Modern Art and Florida: Whale and Star, 2009.

=== Critical studies and reviews of Taylor's work ===
- Jaspers, Anneke (Summer 2014–2015). "In the 'second degree' : revisiting Paul Taylor's 'POPISM' at the NGV". Art Monthly Australia. 276: 50–55.
