= Innocent Records (Australia) =

Defunct Australian record label

Innocent Records was an independent Australian label that released records between 1979 and 1983.

Run by David Chesworth and Philip Brophy, the label was set up to release music by their projects, → ↑ → and Essendon Airport, and solo work by Chesworth and others. It also released two compilations of new music from the Clifton Hill Community Music Centre in 1978–1979 and 1980. Many releases had screen printed covers created by Brophy and Maria Kozic (also in → ↑ →) and most were produced by Chesworth and John Campbell.

== See also ==
- Lists of record labels
