= Crystal Ballroom (Melbourne) =

Music venue in Melbourne, Victoria, Australia

Coordinates: 37°51′33.8″S 144°58′38.5″E

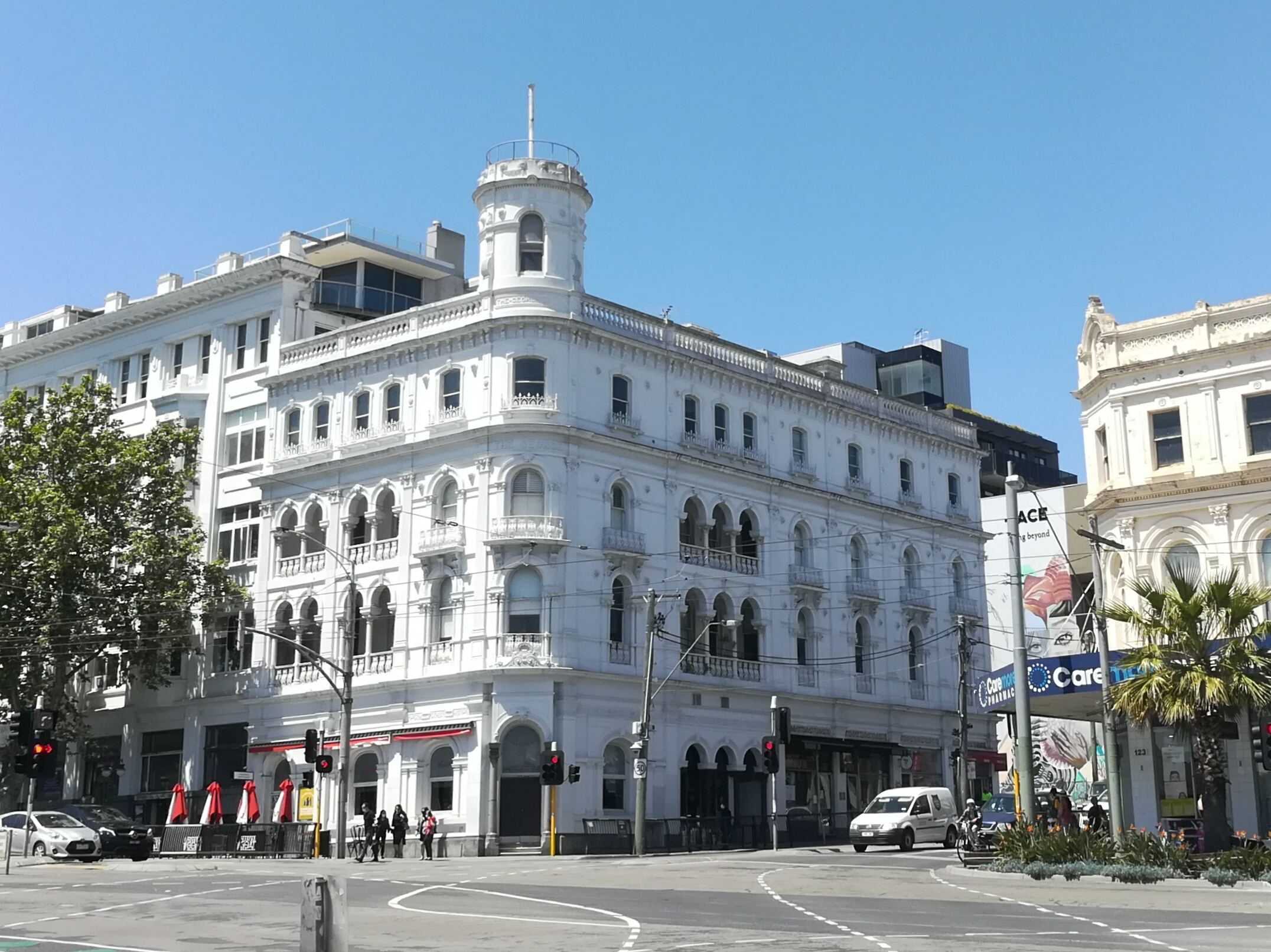
George Hotel, home of the Crystal Ballroom

The Crystal Ballroom (also known as the Seaview Ballroom and the Wintergarden Room) was a music venue that opened in 1978 in St Kilda, an inner suburb of Melbourne, Australia. Located within the George Hotel at 125 Fitzroy Street, it quickly became the epicentre of Melbourne's post-punk scene, launching the careers of The Birthday Party, Dead Can Dance and other local groups, as well as hosting international acts, including The Cure, New Order and The Fall.

The Ballroom occupied a Victorian age ballroom adorned with chandeliers, which inspired the venue's name. Owned by Australian rules football identity Graeme Richmond, it was initially run by music promoter Dolores San Miguel (who also ran St Kilda's Esplanade Hotel), then by Laurie Richards, founder of the Tiger Lounge in Richmond and the Jump Club in Fitzroy. In 1980, they co-ran the Ballroom and San Miguel opened on the ground floor a second performance space, the Paradise Lounge, which became a hub for Melbourne's Little Band scene. Richards also founded Crystal Ballroom Records to release 7-inch singles as giveaways at certain shows. Nigel Rennard, owner of Missing Link Records, took over as booker in 1981. San Miguel returned in 1984 and ran the Ballroom until it was forced to close in 1987 due to its reputation for drug dealing and general decrepitness.

== History ==
=== Background ===
The Crystal Ballroom occupied several rooms within the George Hotel at 125 Fitzroy Street, St Kilda, which was established in 1857 as the Terminus Hotel and located at the end of the original St Kilda railway line. St Kilda at the time was an affluent area and became well known over the next century as Melbourne's seaside playground, home to amusement parks and other attractions. In 1885, the hotel was rebuilt to a design by architect Harry Browse Gibbs, featuring a large dining room that would go on to serve as a ballroom. In the 1960s, the ballroom became a venue for cabaret acts such as Helen Reddy and Barry Crocker. St Kilda's glamour had begun to fade during this period, and by the early 1970s, Fitzroy Street was the public face of Melbourne's red light district, known for prostitution, drug-related street crime, and fringe and underground cultures.

=== The Ballroom ===
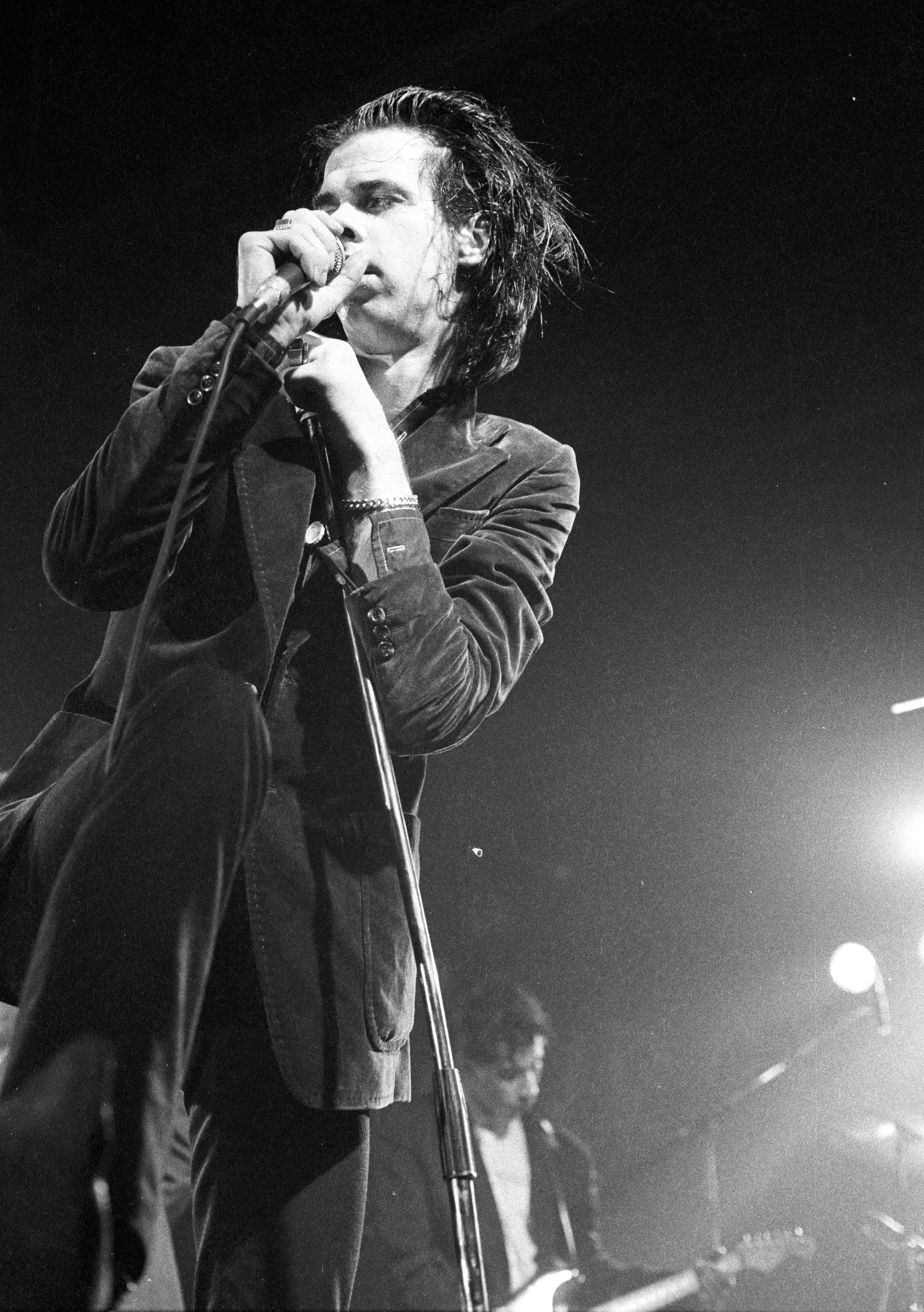
Nick Cave performing in 1986. Music journalist Clinton Walker referred to the Ballroom as Cave's "first great stage".

In 1978, Dolores San Miguel approached the hotel's proprietor, Richmond Football Club administrator Graeme Richmond, with a proposal to book acts from Melbourne's burgeoning punk rock and new wave scenes. Richmond agreed, and in August San Miguel converted a side room on an upper floor of the hotel into the Wintergarden Room. The first band to play there was JAB, who had recently relocated to Melbourne from Adelaide. San Miguel soon took control of the upstairs ballroom, which she also christened the Wintergarden Room. The first ballroom gig was held on 2 September and headlined by The Birthday Party, featuring Nick Cave, Mick Harvey and Rowland S. Howard. The band soon had a Saturday night residency at the venue; one of their January 1979 shows marked the debut live performance of Whirlywirld, a supporting act fronted by Ollie Olsen. Other Melbourne bands that took to the ballroom stage around this time include Crime and the City Solution, Primitive Calculators, Equal Local and Models, as well as Essendon Airport and Tsk Tsk Tsk, both principally associated with the Organ Factory, an artist-run space in Clifton Hill.

In February 1979 the venue was taken over by Laurie Richards, who renamed it the Crystal Ballroom. That year, he established Crystal Ballroom Records to release special-pressed seven-inch singles recorded by Ballroom bands, which were given away for free at the venue at the end of a number of gigs. While Richards continued to regularly book local groups, he also attracted many touring bands from other states and overseas.

San Miguel returned in April 1980 to run weeknight gigs in what she christened the Paradise Lounge on the ground floor. Melbourne's Little Band scene flourished here, giving rise to acts such as Dead Can Dance, which featured Lisa Gerrard and Brendan Perry and went on to regularly headline at the Ballroom; they played an Australian farewell show at the Ballroom on the cusp of relocating to London, England in May 1982. Another notable band to emerge during this period was Hunters & Collectors, featuring members of little band and Paradise Lounge regulars the Jetsonnes. Hunters & Collectors rehearsed for over a month at the Ballroom before staging their first ever live performance there in May 1981. The Birthday Party played their last ever show at the venue on 9 June 1983. After the band disbanded later that year, frontman Cave organised a New Year's Show at the Ballroom, playing with a backing band under the moniker Nick Cave: Man or Myth?, a group now recognised as the first live incarnation of Nick Cave and the Bad Seeds. The Birthday Party and the Bad Seeds, along with Ballroom stalwarts the Moodists, inspired a new generation of dark, noisy punk blues bands at the venue, including the Wreckery, Fungus Brains, Blue Ruin and Sacred Cowboys.

After Laurie left in January 1981, San Miguel co-ran the Crystal Ballroom, which she renamed the Seaview Ballroom, with Nigel Rennard until a falling out in September 1981, whereby San Miguel vacated her position. Rennard ran it until the end of 1983. San Miguel returned as the venue's owner the following year.

=== Closure and aftermath ===
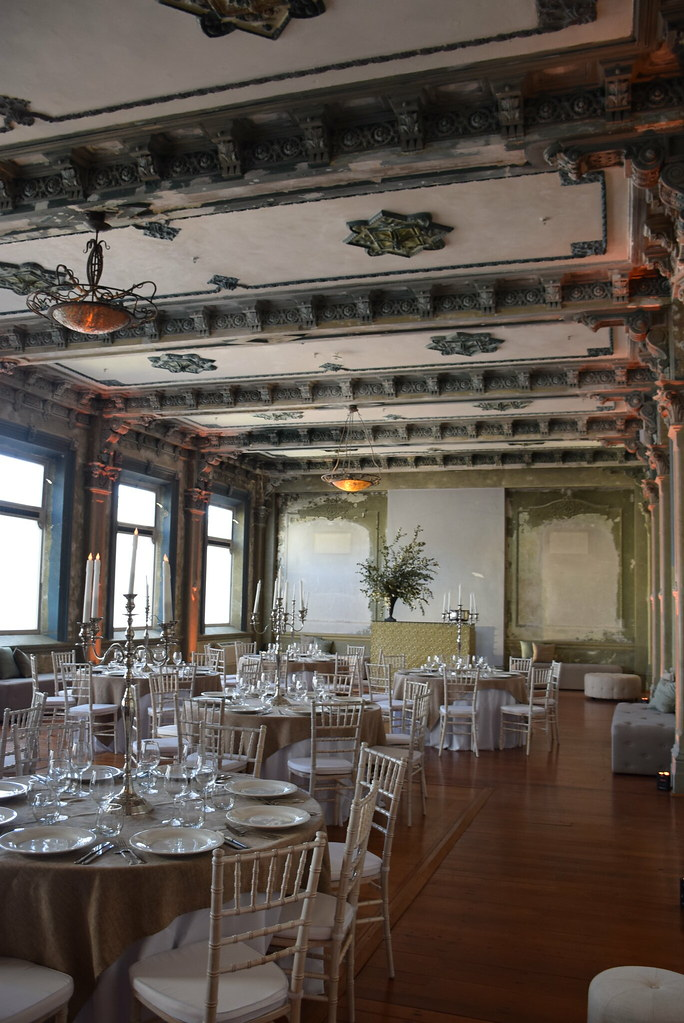
The ballroom in 2016

By 1986, the Ballroom had become notorious as a drug dealing venue, which, along with other criminal activities, led to a forced closure and de-licensing in 1987. The hotel reopened in 1991, and in 1995–96 it was redeveloped as apartments, with the ballroom converted into a function room, and shops, cafes and bars occupying the ground level. Today the George is also home to two music venues: the George Lounge and George Lane.

== Notable regulars and performers ==
The Ballroom scene attracted many artists working in a variety of mediums. Filmmakers John Hillcoat, Richard Lowenstein, Paul Goldman and Chris Kennedy shot Ballroom concerts and directed music videos for Ballroom bands. The video for the Birthday Party's 1981 single "Nick the Stripper" was filmed by Goldman and edited by Hillcoat, and features many Ballroom regulars partying in a Hieronymus Bosch-inspired "carnival vision of hell". Members of the Ballroom scene were also recruited for Lowenstein's post-apocalyptic video accompanying the debut single of Hunters & Collectors, "Talking to a Stranger" (1982). Painter Howard Arkley, one of the venue's regulars, created Ballroom gig posters, while Jenny Watson captured its subculture in a series of paintings; Nick Cave used one of Watson's paintings as an onstage prop during a 1979 show at the Ballroom. Other members of the Ballroom scene included fashion designers Jenny Bannister and Alannah Hill, photographers Rennie Ellis and Polly Borland, writers Michel Faber, Andy Griffiths, Tobsha Learner and Sonya Voumard, television presenter Margot O'Neill and magazine editor Deborah Thomas.

The Ballroom was a staging ground for Melbourne bands the Birthday Party, Dead Can Dance, Hunters & Collectors, Crime and the City Solution, Models, the Moodists, the Wreckery, TISM, Paul Kelly and the Dots, Cosmic Psychos and Venom P. Stinger. It also showcased the following interstate groups: INXS, Laughing Clowns, Radio Birdman, Sunnyboys, the Celibate Rifles, Beasts of Bourbon, X, Hoodoo Gurus, Died Pretty, SPK, the Reels, Rose Tattoo, Icehouse, Hard-Ons, Pel Mel, XL Capris, Midnight Oil and the Church from Sydney; the Go-Betweens, the Saints and the Riptides from Brisbane; the Scientists, the Stems and the Triffids from Perth; the Angels and Cold Chisel from Adelaide; and Tactics from Canberra. Originally from New Zealand, Mi-Sex and Split Enz also appeared at the Ballroom. Other international bands who played there include Simple Minds, the Cure, Magazine, Echo & the Bunnymen, the Psychedelic Furs, the Stranglers, XTC, the Teardrop Explodes, the Residents, Snakefinger, Squeeze, Public Image Ltd, New Order, the Gun Club, John Cooper Clarke, Dr. Feelgood, the Human League, John Cale, Violent Femmes, Iggy Pop, the Fall, Jonathan Richman and the Modern Lovers and Dead Kennedys. During their 27 November 1982 Ballroom show, New Order debuted live "Blue Monday", a few months ahead of its release as a single.

== Legacy ==
The Ballroom, and its association with a host of local and international music acts, has been documented in a wide range of media. The Crystal Ballroom scene inspired the creation of a number of zines, including Pulp, Fast Forward and Tension. It was also covered in the punk magazine Roadrunner, which celebrated its second birthday at the venue in 1980. Australian culture critic Clinton Walker devoted much of his first book, Inner City Sound (1981), to the Ballroom, and in his fourth book Stranded: The Secret History of Australian Independent Music 1977-1991 (1996), he revisits the time and place in greater detail.

Paul Kelly and the Coloured Girls refer to the venue in their song "The Ballroom", released on the band's 1986 album Gossip.

Live Ballroom recordings have appeared on official releases by acts such as The Moodists, Crime and the City Solution, Radio Birdman, Iggy Pop and New Race. Side 2 of Adelaide band Grong Grong's self-titled debut album, released in 1986 on Alternative Tentacles, is composed of songs from their October 1983 Ballroom show.

The 1986 punk film Dogs in Space, directed by Richard Lowenstein and starring Michael Hutchence, is partially shot and set in the Crystal Ballroom, and features many musicians, artists and others who frequented the venue. The Ballroom's role in Melbourne music is also reflected upon in Lowenstein's 2011 documentary We're Livin' on Dog Food. In 2011, San Miguel published a book titled The Ballroom: The Melbourne Punk & Post Punk Scene.

== See also ==
- Esplanade Hotel, alternative music venue in St Kilda
- Prince of Wales Hotel, alternative music venue in St Kilda
- Music of Melbourne
