= Tsk Tsk Tsk =

Australian artist collective

Tsk Tsk Tsk → ↑ →
- Origin: Melbourne, Victoria, Australia
- Genres: Experimental, experimental rock, free improvisation, electronic, art rock, minimalism
- Years active: 1977–1986
- Labels: Innocent, Present, Dumb Films, Crystal Ballroom, Missing Link
- Past members: Philip Brophy; Ralph Traviato; Leigh Parkhill; Maria Kozic; Jayne Stevenson

→ ↑ → (pronounced as three clicks, often written incorrectly as Tsk Tsk Tsk or Tch Tch Tch) was an Australian music, art and performance group, best known for their experimental music. They formed in Melbourne in 1977 and were led by Philip Brophy. The group performed music, produced artwork, films, videos, live theatre, multi-media, and wrote literature.

== History ==
The Clifton Hill Community Music Centre, located in the Melbourne suburb of Clifton Hill, was an artist-run space focused on the performance of new sound art and experimental music, and was the base for Philip Brophy's project, → ↑ →. Sometimes compared to Andy Warhol's Factory collective, the group provided experimental music (Brophy on drums or synthesiser), films, videos, and live theatrical performances exploring his aesthetic and cultural interests, often on a minimal budget. → ↑ → were often seen as working with Roland Barthes theory of The Death of The Author. They were primarily interested in demystifying creative practices and analysing cultural phenomenons, stripping them down to their most basic defining characteristics. Musically the group touched upon a wide range of experimental styles including minimalism, punk rock, muzak, krautrock and disco, usually with no vocalist, which frustrated countless music audiences. While they were regularly presenting music and performances in art spaces like the Clifton Hill Community Music Centre and even the National Gallery of Victoria, → ↑ → frequently played with post-punk and new wave bands, including The Boys Next Door at pubs like the Crystal Ballroom in St. Kilda to non-art audiences.

Over the project's operation it involved over sixty of Brophy's friends in variable line-ups that included musician David Chesworth from Essendon Airport, a post-punk band who explored similar experimental music forms, on synthesiser, and visual artists Maria Kozic and Jayne Stevenson both on synthesiser. The group grew to notable popularity in the early-mid 1980s, being asked to participate in a range of large scale Australian exhibitions, including Paul Taylor’s Popism at the National Gallery of Victoria in 1982, the 1982 Biennale of Sydney, and the Art Gallery of New South Wales art festival Perspecta in 1983. Artistically, they were closely linked to Paul Taylor, the artists in his Popism exhibition including Juan Davila, Howard Arkley and Jenny Watson, and Taylor’s journal Art & Text to which Brophy contributed. Crossover between this art scene with the Melbourne post-punk and new wave can be seen in both Arkley and Watson painting of images of Nick Cave, but also in Art & Text publishing articles about music subcultures, Taylor even using current music terms to describe these young visual artists as the “Australian New Wave”. → ↑ → crossed both though, appearing in exhibitions with the aforementioned artists but also performing frequently with groups like The Boys Next Door and including them in gigs they organised such as Punk Gunk where they performed their work/band “Punk Band”.

The band performed or exhibited in Europe, including London's Institute of Contemporary Arts and Paris' Museum of Modern Art. In 1983 Brophy produced a retrospective book, Made by → ↑ →, which is co-credited to → ↑ →. He dissolved the project shortly after the 1986 European tour of Stills, but continued to work with Kozic prior to her relocation to New York City.

In 1982-83 Brophy (drums) and Traviato (sax) also played and recorded with the post-punk big band Hot Half Hour, a large ensemble led by Dean Richards (guitar) which included members of Equal Local and other Melbourne groups.

== Asphixiation: What is This Thing Called 'Disco'? ==
This work first appeared as a performance and installation by → ↑ → in 1980 at the George Paton Gallery called Asphixiation: What is This Thing Called ‘Disco’?. It featured large screen printed reproductions of fashion magazines and several plinths with instruments, tape players and hanging frames, all lit with neon. The performance involved the group miming to a disco album they made, the reel-to-reel visibly playing, and was recorded by David Chesworth, the album itself written in five days. In contrast to earlier → ↑ → recordings, this album included lyrics and vocals. After this show, a representative of Missing Link Records approached the group about doing a single, to see if it would be a breakthrough hit like they had the previous year with The Flying Lizards' "Money". If this was successful they would put out the whole album. The single was for the song "L'Acrostique D'Amour" with the b-side "The Crush" and was released under the name Asphixiation. Seemingly the records did not sell enough, so the album was released on Brophy and Chesworth's label Innocent, with the single re-pressed by Innocent and packaged with the album. The project was focused on what Brophy saw as a phenomenon of disco being used to market a whole range of consumer products, tied to its ongoing commercialisation in mainstream music.

== Legacy ==
The music of → ↑ → has appeared on various compilations from the 2000s into the 2010s which look at underground Australian new wave music. → ↑ → and Asphixiation appear on both of Chapter Music's Can’t Stop It! compilations. Andras Fox and Instant Peterson made a compilation titled Midnite Spares in 2016 of "overlooked avant-pop and electronic works" released on Efficient Space, an offshoot label of Noise in My Head. The record included "Sedation" as well as a later song by Maria Kozic and The MK Sound, the MK Sound being Philip Brophy, both members of → ↑ →, called "Trust Me". Chapter Music reissued the Asphixiation album What is Thing Thing Called ‘Disco’? in July 2017, along with the additional single it originally came with, as well as new liner notes and photographs. In the context of art, → ↑ → were included in the National Gallery of Victoria's 2013 exhibition Mix Tape 1980s: Appropriation, Subculture, Critical Style which used a lot of material from Paul Taylor's 1982 Popism exhibition. It also included several albums available to listen to, including Asphixiation's What is This Thing Called ‘Disco’?.

== Members ==
→ ↑ → was a fluid project with some key members. The following list indicates individuals known to be involved in the project but the extent/years of their involvement is problematic.

=== Key members ===
- Philip Brophy – drums, synthesiser (1977–1986)
- Ralph Traviato – saxophone, synthesiser (1977–1983)
- Leigh Parkhill – guitar, synthesiser (1977–1983)
- Maria Kozic – synthesiser (1978–1986)
- Jayne Stevenson – synthesiser (1978–1983)

=== Participants ===
- Anthony (Anthe) Montemurro – synthesiser (1977–1978)
- Alan Gaunt – synthesiser (1977–1978)
- Ernie Althoff - saxophone (Wartime Art 1980)
- Kim Beissel – saxophone (Wartime Art 1980); actor (No Dance 1985 version, Stills 1986)
- Frank Bendinelli – video maker (Spaces 1981)
- Robert Randall – video maker (Spaces 1981)
- Rod Bishop – film producer (No Dance 1985 version)
- Melanie Brelis - actor (Stills 1986)
- David Chesworth – synthesiser, actor (Stills 1986)
- Ian Cox – saxophone
- Paul Fletcher – drums
- Robert Goodge – guitar
- Barbara Hogarth – bass guitar
- Philip Moreland – (1983)

== Bibliography ==
- Brophy, Philip, ed. (1983). Made by → ↑ →, 1977–1982. Northcote, Vic: self-published. OCLC 219829632.

== Discography ==
=== Albums ===
- Live (1980 double-cassette)
- Live Vol. 2 (1980 double-cassette)
- Caprice (December 1980, Present Records)
- Spaces (October 1981, Innocent)
- No Dance (soundtrack, 1982, Present)
- "What Is This Thing Called 'Disco'?" (as Asphixiation) (December 1981, Innocent, reissued July 2017, Chapter Music)

=== Extended plays ===
- Venetian Rendezvous (April 1979, repressed May 1979, Innocent)
- Nice Noise (September 1979, repressed November 1979, Innocent)
- → ↑ → (March 1980, Innocent)
- Sound Tracks (1983, Present Records)

=== Singles ===
- "Pop Art" (shared single with Eric Gradman: Man & Machine) (December 1979, Crystal Ballroom)
- "L'Acrostique D'Amour" b/w "The Crush" (as Asphixiation) (February 1981, Missing Link, repressed December 1981, Innocent)

=== Compilations ===
- New Music 1978/79 (1981, Innocent) featuring "Oomgawa Wana Tuba Bibi"
- New Music 1980 (1981, Innocent) featuring "Various Levels"
- Can't Stop It! (2001, Chapter Music) featuring "One Note Song"
- Inner City Sound (2005, Laughing Outlaw Records) featuring "Pop Art"
- Can't Stop It! II (2007, Chapter Music) featuring "The Crush" (as Asphixiation)
- Midnite Spares (2016, Efficient Space) featuring "Sedation"

== Filmography ==
A music video for the song "Aural Risk" by → ↑ → under the name Asphixiation was made in 1982. It was shown on Australian TV only once until Chapter Music uploaded it to YouTube on April 13, 2017, for their reissue of the Asphixiation album.

Ten Super 8 films, which were made by → ↑ → during 1978–1982, were later transferred to video tape (136 min). The collection is credited to Philip Brophy (film maker) and Tch Tch Tch (Performing arts group):

- Super 8 films made by Tch Tch Tch
  - Phantom No. 362 – 29 min
  - Suspense/Play – 13 min
  - Excerpts from Contracted Cinema – 12 min
  - 1980 Moscow Olympics Opening Ceremony on HSV7 – 9 min
  - The Celluloid Self – 13 min
  - Romantic Story – 20 min
  - I-You-We – 6 min
  - Caprice – 4 min
  - Excerpts from Muzak, Rock and Minimalism – 10 min
  - No Dance – 20 min

== See also ==
- Essendon Airport
