= Vivienne Garrett =

Australian actress

- Born: . c.1952 (aged 73-74); Sydney, Australia
- Education: National Institute of Dramatic Art (NIDA)
- Occupations: Actress; theatre director; former restaurateur; drama/elocution tutor; yoga instructor/therapist

Vivienne Garrett (born c.1952) is an Australian-based theatre, film and television actress. She is a theatre director, acting and voice coach and also a qualified yoga instructor and therapist. She was born in Sydney and now lives in Western Australia. Garrett graduated from the National Institute of Dramatic Art (NIDA) in 1970.

Her best known role was as rebellious teenager Rose Godolfus (later Myers), an original character in TV serial Number 96, her character was involved in numerous controversial storylines.

== Early life ==
Garratt was born in c. 1952, to a father who was a professional squash player, who served in the military during World War II, where he was held as a POW at Changi, she trained in the arts at the National Institute of Dramatic Art and in Canada in Voice and movement.

== Early career ==
Garratt a primary school student was chosen to star in a theatrical production of The Little Mermaid where she was spotted by Geoff Harvey the then musical director for TCN-9 and subsequently began performing and singing on children's television talent show Comedy Capers. While still a teenager, her first screen acting role was in The Unloved produced by NLT Productions in 1968. After graduating from NIDA she toured with a Theatre in Education company and had guest roles in police dramas Homicide and Matlock Police.

== Career ==
Garrett, at age of 19, was cast in her best known role as rebellious Rose Godolfus, the daughter of deli owner Aldo (Johnny Lockwood), in top-rated soap opera Number 96. She was a member of the original cast of Number 96 when it began in March 1972.

Number 96 brought sexual situations and nude scenes to Australian television for the first time. Although series star Abigail became famous for being the first woman to appear topless on Australian television, in fact it was Garrett, who was topless in the serial's first episode, who deserves the credit. However the scene was screened only in Sydney. By the time the episode went to air in other localities in the days following, the shot had been cut by censors after complaints from viewers. Garrett remained in the show for five months, breaking her contract and leaving the series over a storyline where Rose was gang raped by a group of bikers in which the script called for her to be actually enjoying it.

After leaving Number 96 she had a guest role in Division 4 and also worked in theatre. She spent three years as a company member of Rex Cramphorn's celebrated Performance Syndicate appearing in productions including The Tempest, Shakuntala and the Ring of Recognition, Muriel, Berenice, and Scapin. They also devised original physical theatre pieces and worked with internationally acclaimed Jerzy Grotowski and his company.

She resumed the role of Rose for a limited number of episodes of Number 96 in 1975, and appeared in a recurring sketch in comedy series The Norman Gunston Show called The Checkout Chicks. This sketch, written by Bill Harding, was a send-up of melodramatic soap operas and set in a supermarket. It featured other former Number 96 actors – Abigail, Candy Raymond, Philippa Baker, Judy Lynne, Anne Louise Lambert, John Paramor and Johnny Lockwood.

In 1976 she travelled to India where she studied yoga, meditation and philosophy at an ashram for 12 months under the guidance of Baba Muktananda in Ganeshpuri. She wrote about the experience in 1977 for the lifestyle magazine Simply Living. Back in Australia, she worked on student films for Australian Film Television and Radio School and continued to act in theatre and on screen.

== Filmography ==
=== Film ===
Year	Title	Role	Type
1976	Caddie	Maudie's friend 2	Feature film
1979	The Hero	The Actress / Lara Bell	Short film
1983	For Love or Money	Self	Documentary film
1988	Boundaries of the Heart	Freda	Feature film
1993	Blackfellas	Youth Worker	Feature film
1998	Seclusion	Angela	Short film
2001	Let's Get Skase	Ruth D’Amato	TV movie
2020	I Met a Girl	Female driver	Feature film

=== Television ===
Year	Title	Role	Type
	Comedy Capers	Performer/singer	TV talent show
1968	The Unloved		TV series
1971	Homicide	Carol Archer	TV series, 1 episode
1973	Division 4	Alison	TV series, 1 episode
1971 / 1974	Matlock Police	Angela / Beth Hill	TV series
1972, 1975	Number 96	Rose Godolfus / Rose Myers	TV series, 50 episodes
1975	The Norman Gunston Show	Member of The Checkout Chicks	TV series, 6 episodes
1978	Cop Shop	Ruth Forest	TV series, 2 episodes
1984	Mother and Son	Tessa	TV series, 1 episode
1984	Bodyline	Post Office Clerk	TV miniseries, 2 episodes
1993	Haydaze	Jill Simmons	TV series
1993	Ship to Shore		TV series
1996	Sweat	Mary Rodriguez	TV series, 1 episode
1998	Minty	Pamela-Anne	TV series
	Streetsmartz		TV series
2001	Let's Get Skase	Ruth D'Amato	Feature film
2003	The Shark Net	Mrs Halliday	TV miniseries, 1 episode
2019	Lift	Lynne	TV series

== Theatre ==
Year	Title	Role	Notes
1950s	The Little Mermaid		High school performance
1967	The Choephori (The Libation Bearers)		University of NSW
1969	Antigone		NIDA Theatre
1969	Student Graduation Plays		Jane Street Theatre
1970	A Midsummer Night's Dream		University of NSW & Old Tote Theatre
1970	Blood Wedding		University of NSW, Old Tote Theatre
1971	Hamlet		Phillip Street Theatre
1972	Dear Janet Rosenberg, Dear Mr. Kooning		AMP Theatrette, Sydney
1972	Butterflies Are Free		Twelfth Night Theatre
1973	Measure for Measure		Union Hall, Adelaide
1974	Shakuntala and the Ring of Recognition		Australian Mineral Foundation Theatre with Rex Cramphorn's Performance Syndicate
1974	My Shadow and Me		Jane Street Theatre
1974	Muriel		Jane Street Theatre with Rex Cramphorn's Performance Syndicate
1975	Berenice		Sydney Opera House with Rex Cramphorn's Performance Syndicate
1975	Scapin		Sydney Opera House with Rex Cramphorn's Performance Syndicate
	The Tempest	Miranda / Ariel	Rex Cramphorn's Performance Syndicate
1975	Mariner		Jane Street Theatre
1975	Interplay		Jane Street Theatre
1978	Dusa, Fish, Stas and Vi		Russell Street Theatre, Playhouse Theatre, Perth, Union Hall, Adelaide & Theatre Royal, Sydney
1978	As You Like It	Celia	Jane Street Theatre
1979	The Lady of the Camellias		Sydney Opera House
1979	On Our Selection	Sarah	Jane Street Theatre & Nimrod Theatre
1979	Waiting for Godot		Jane Street Theatre
1979	The House of the Deaf Man		Nimrod Theatre
1980	The Bride of Gospel Place		Jane Street Theatre
1980	The Dybbuk	Leye	Jane Street Theatre
1982	Variations		Belvoir St Theatre & Nimrod Theatre
1983	Top Girls	Marlene	Nimrod Theatre
1984	The Servant of Two Masters		Nimrod Theatre
1984	Extremities		Sydney Opera House
1985	Cheapside		Seymour Centre
1988	Europe		Playhouse Theatre, Perth
1988	A Chorus of Disapproval		Playhouse Theatre, Perth
1988	Rough Crossing		Playhouse Theatre, Perth
1988	From Here to Maternity		Princess May Theatre, Fremantle
1990	The Death of Minnie	Minnie	One-woman show by Barry Dickens
1990	The Christian Brothers		The Studio Theatre, Subiaco
1991	The Popular Mechanics		Playhouse Theatre, Perth
1991	Emma		Old Customs House, Fremantle, The Hole in the Wall Theatre, Players, Civic Square, ACT
1993	Blood Moon		Western Australia
1993	Witchplay	Batcha	Perth Institute of Contemporary Arts. One-woman show by Tobsha Learner (Garrett also produced)
1994	The Lift		Perth Institute of Contemporary Arts
1994	Brilliant Lies		Playhouse Theatre, Perth
1994	Breaststroke		SWY Theatre, Perth
1995	Dead Funny	Eleanor	Perth Theatre Company
1995	Subi Shorts Program 1: Family Running for Mr Whippy / The Price of Prayer / Darling Oscar		Subiaco Theatre Centre
1996	Burning Time	Kel	Malthouse Theatre & Subiaco Theatre Centre
1996	Blackrock		Subiaco Theatre Centre
2001	The Vagina Monologues		Subiaco Theatre Centre
2003	Breaststroke		Rechabite Hall, Perth
2003	Necessary Targets	J.S.	Darlinghurst Theatre
2004	Live Acts on Stage		Playhouse Theatre, Perth
2004	The Vagina Monologues		University of Sydney
2005	Necessary Targets	J.S.	Malthouse Theatre
2007	Life x 3		Playhouse Theatre, Perth
2009	Checklist for an Armed Robber		Victoria Hall
2009	The Lonely Hearts Club		Victoria Hall
2010	The Clean House	Anna	Cremorne Theatre for Black Swan State Theatre Company
2011	When the Rain Stops Falling		State Theatre Centre of WA, Heath Ledger Theatre
2012	Biddies		Australian tour
2013	Other Desert Cities	Silda	State Theatre Centre of WA, Heath Ledger Theatre for Black Swan State Theatre Company & Playhouse, South Bank for Queensland Theatre Company
2016	Lighten Up	Bronwyn	Stables Theatre, Sydney
2016	The Children		Royal Court Jerwood Theatre for Theatre 180
2018	Summer of the Seventeenth Doll	Emma Leech	State Theatre Centre of WA, Heath Ledger Theatre
2020	Summer of the Seventeenth Doll		Online from WA
	The Crucible		Old Tote Theatre
	Equus		

== Theatre awards ==
In 1995 Garrett won the Swan Gold Award for Most Outstanding Female Actor for her portrayal of Eleanor in Dead Funny for the Perth Theatre Company. In 2014 she won Best Female Support Actor for her role of Silda in Other Desert Cities for Black Swan State Theatre Company/Queensland Theatre Company. She has also been nominated for roles in Live Acts on Stage, Equus, The Clean House and Summer of the Seventeenth Doll.

== Directing ==
Garrett has worked as a theatre director on productions of Breaststroke, Ursula's Ecstasy, The Spook, Margritte and Tartuffe. She has also directed more than twenty short story productions for ABC Radio National.

== Further work ==
Since 2006 Garrett could be heard on Australian television as a voice-over artist. She has also taught Stage and Screen Acting, Voice and Theatre Studies at the Western Australian Academy of Performing Arts, University of Notre Dame Australia, TAFTA and NIDA.

== Studies ==
After graduating from NIDA with a BA in Dramatic Arts Garrett went on to post graduate studies in Voice and Shakespearean Text at Simon Fraser University, Vancouver BC, Canada.
