= Roslyn Oxley9 Gallery =

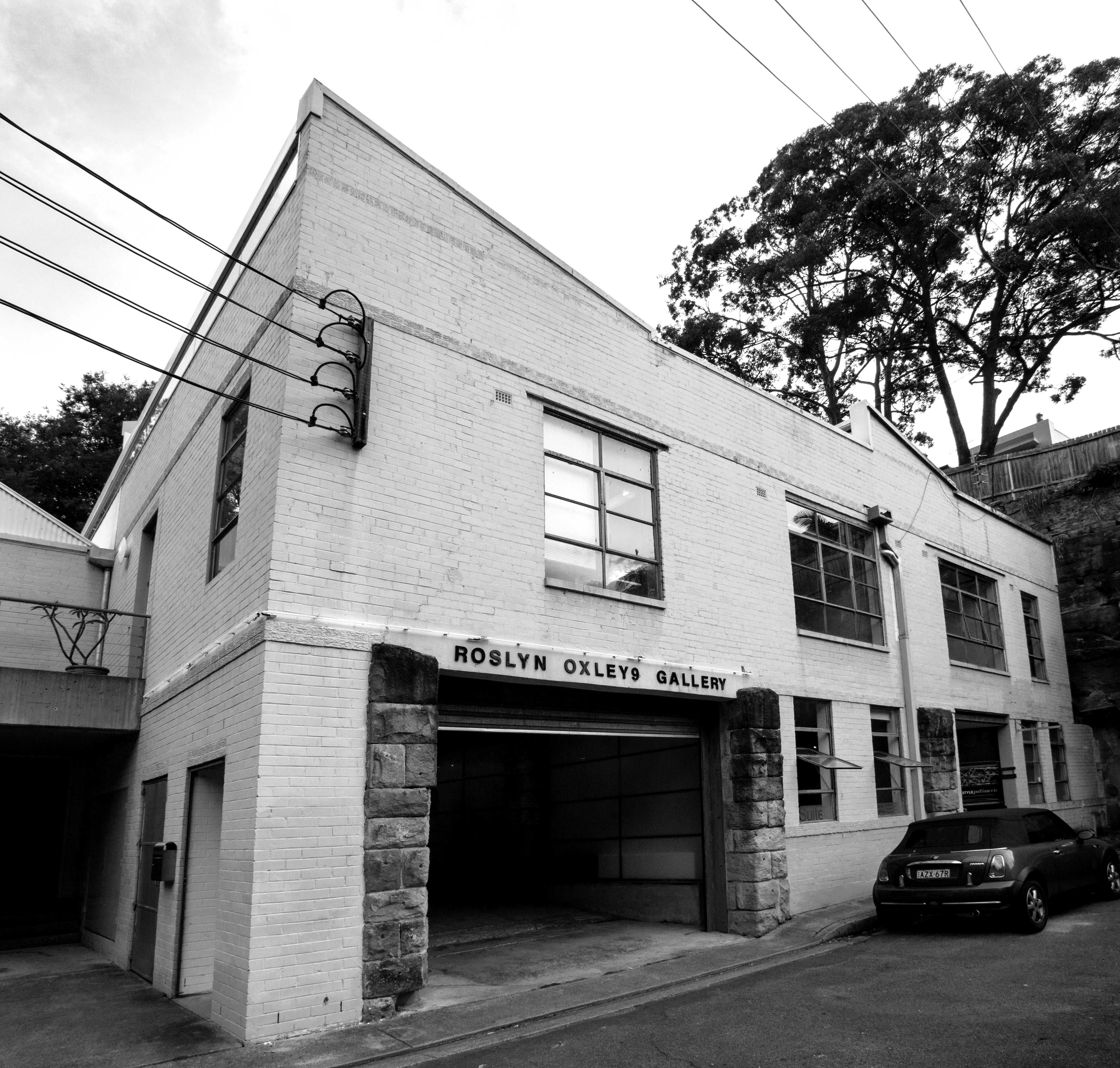
Roslyn Oxley9 Gallery

Roslyn Oxley9 Gallery is an art gallery in Sydney, owned and operated by Roslyn Oxley and her husband Tony Oxley. The gallery has been a longstanding contributor to regional, national and international art fairs, and supporter of a range of mono-disciplinary and interdisciplinary contemporary artists. Artists represented by Roslyn Oxley9 Gallery include Isaac Julien, Yayoi Kusama and representatives for Australia and New Zealand at the Venice Biennale.

== History ==
The gallery opened in Macdonald Street, Paddington, in March 1982 with an exhibition of paintings by Gareth Sansom. The gallery's second exhibition was part of the Biennale of Sydney, when gallery artist Juan Davila's multi-panel work 'Stupid as a Painter' quickly gained notoriety.

=== 1980s ===
In 1983, 12 gallery artists were included in ‘D’un autre continent: l’Australie, le rêve et le réel’ at the ARC, Paris Museum of Modern Art. Mike Parr and Ken Unsworth were included in ‘An Australian Accent’, the Kaldor Public Art Projects exhibition that travelled to New York's MoMA PS1 and Washington DC's Corcoran Gallery of Art in 1984. That year gallery artists Dale Frank, John Nixon and Vivienne Shark LeWitt were included in ‘Australian Visions’ at the Solomon R. Guggenheim Museum, New York. 6 gallery artists were included ‘Edge to Edge: Australian Contemporary Art to Japan’ that travelled to Osaka, Tokyo, Nagoya and Hokkaido. In 1986, Roslyn Oxley9 Gallery held the first solo show of Marc Newson, with his Lockheed Lounge Seminal.

=== 1990s ===
In 1990, the gallery moved to its current location in Soudan Lane, Paddington. That year the gallery was invited to participate at Art Cologne, the first of many involvements at international art fairs.

At the new premises in Soudan Lane, Roslyn Oxley9 Gallery's stable of artists expanded during the decade to include Rosalie Gascoigne, Bill Henson, Fiona Hall, Tracey Moffatt, Patricia Piccinini and David Noonan. In 1993, Jenny Watson became the first Roslyn Oxley9 Gallery artist to represent Australia at the Venice Biennale with her exhibition 'Painting will Veils and False Tails'. Bill Henson also represented Australia in the Venice Biennale in 1995, curated by Isobel Crombie.

== Artists ==
Roslyn Oxley9 Gallery represents over 40 artists from a range of artistic disciplines, in addition to the estates of Robert Campbell Junior, Rosalie Gascoigne and Bronwyn Oliver. The gallery has nurtured the international careers of Australian artists such as A Constructed World, Fiona Hall, Bill Henson, Tracey Moffatt, David Noonan and Patricia Piccinini, and has actively promoted the work of international artists such as Wim Delvoye, Isaac Julien, Teppei Kaneuji and Yayoi Kusama.

=== International Artists at Roslyn Oxley9 Gallery ===
| Artist name | Year(s) | Nationality |
|---|---|---|
| Joyce Stillman-Myers | 1982 | United States |
| William Tillyer | 1982 | United Kingdom |
| Susan Hiller | 1983 | United States |
| John Bellany | 1983, 1987 | United Kingdom |
| Bill Culbert | 1994–2019 | New Zealand |
| Jacqueline Fraser | 1998–2019 | New Zealand |
| Anthony Howell | 1984 | United Kingdom |
| Keith Haring | 1986 | United States |
| David Tremlett | 1988 | United Kingdom |
| Brice Marden | 1989 | United States |
| Issey Miyake (designer) | 1990 | Japan |
| Pierre et Gilles | 1995 | France |
| Erwin Olaf | 1996 | The Netherlands |
| Young British Artists group show | 1996 | United Kingdom |
| Robert Mapplethorpe | 1997, 2000 | United States |
| Mariko Mori | 1997 | Japan |
| Yayoi Kusama | 2002, 2005, 2007, 2009 | Japan |
| Tracey Emin | 2004 | United Kingdom |
| Michael Bell-Smith | 2007 | United States |
| Teppei Kaneuji | 2009, 2011, 2013 | Japan |
| Isaac Julien | 2010, 2014 – 2019 | United Kingdom |
| Wim Delvoye | 2012 | Belgium |
| Jim Lambie | 2015 | United Kingdom |

=== Australian artists at Roslyn Oxley9 Gallery ===
Another hallmark of Roslyn Oxley9 Gallery has been the regular exhibition of artists not represented by the gallery. These have included Marc Newson (1986), Harry Seidler (1992, 2004), Pierre et Gilles (1995), Erwin Olaf (1996), Robert Mapplethorpe (1996, 1997, 2000), William Yang (1997), Mariko Mori (1997), Elmgreen and Dragset (2000), Tracey Emin (2004), Hernan Bas (2007), Michael Bell-Smith (2007) and Lorraine Connelly-Northy (2019).

=== Exhibition of Bill Henson works ===
In May 2008, Roslyn Oxley9 Gallery was preparing for an exhibition of the works of artist Bill Henson. The subjects of some works included nude teenage children. Following public complaints to the New South Wales police by eight individuals, including a complaint made by Hetty Johnston, a child protection advocate (from the organisation Bravehearts), police raided the gallery and took into custody over 20 of Henson's photographs. The police considered whether the gallery or Henson may have committed an offence of "production, dissemination or possession of child pornography". In the following days, ACT Policing also seized Henson works, held by the National Gallery of Australia, for consideration under separate legislation. Around two weeks after the photographs were taken from the gallery by police, prosecutors recommended against the laying of charges. The incident sparked national debate, and some other galleries, including Newcastle Art Gallery and Albury Art Gallery, removed Henson works from their walls.

In May 2010, Roslyn Oxley9 Gallery hosted another show of Henson's work. The gallery submitted some of the works to the Australian Classification Board prior to exhibition, to obtain a classification. The Board concluded that the images would be "unlikely to offend a reasonable adult".

== International Art fairs ==
Roslyn Oxley9 Gallery appeared for seven consecutive years at Art Cologne (1990–96, 2012). In 1996 it was also invited to Art Basel in Basel, appearing for 13 consecutive years. There have been regular appearances at Art Forum Berlin (1997–98, 2010), ARCO (2000–02), The Armory Show (2000–04, 2006), Art Basel Hong Kong (2010–19) and the VIP Art Fair (2011–12). In 2013, Roslyn Oxley9 Gallery was the only Australian gallery to exhibit at Frieze New York. The same year it was selected by the international editors of Time Out as one of the highlights of Art Basel Hong Kong.

The gallery has participated regularly in the Venice Biennale. Recent exhibitions include Patricia Piccinini's 'We Are Family' in 2003, Callum Morton's 'Valhalla' in 2007, Hany Armanious' 'The Golden Thread' in 2011, Fiona Hall's 'Wrong Way Time' in 2015 and Tracey Moffatt's 'MY HORIZON' in 2017. Roslyn Oxley9 Gallery has also presented New Zealand artists in the Venice Biennale. Jacqueline Fraser represented New Zealand in 2001. Michael Parekowhai represented New Zealand in 2011 and Bill Culbert in 2013.

== Publications ==
Roslyn Oxley9 Gallery's photographic archive has contributed to a number of exhibition catalogues, monographs and artist books, including:

- Contemporary Art from Australia and New Zealand. Art & Australia Pty Ltd and Dott.
- Del Kathryn Barton. Piper.
- Fiona Hall. Piper.
- Julie Rrap: Body Double. Museum of Contemporary Art and Piper.
- Patricia Piccinini: Nearly Beloved. Piper.
