= Dolores San Miguel =

Australian music promoter and author (1950–2022)

Dolores San Miguel (1 November 1950 – 4 March 2022) was a music promoter and author from Melbourne, Australia.

== Career ==
Dolores San Miguel began her career in Melbourne's music scene in 1975, and became best known for opening the music venue Crystal Ballroom (then known as Seaview Ballroom) at St Kilda’s Seaview Hotel in 1978. She expanded her work as booking agent across several other venues, and is credited with giving the first shows to bands Boys Next Door, Models, Hunters & Collectors, La Femme, and Scrap Museum. International bands such as Public Image Ltd and The Cure also played at the Crystal Ballroom, and it was frequented by film directors, photographers, fashion designers, and artists, including Richard Lowenstein, Howard Arkley, and Jenny Watson.

When the Seaview Hotel's owner wanted to book high-profile acts rather than local, San Miguel protested and was replaced as the venue promoter in 1979. She was invited back the following year to run a new night called The Paradise Lounge.

In 2009 she was included in the documentary We're Livin' on Dog Food on Melbourne's underground music scene of 1977–81. She wrote her own book about the scene titled The Ballroom – The Melbourne Punk and Post-Punk Scene, which was published by Melbourne Books in 2011.

After moving to her ancestral home in Alella, Spain in 2016, she died in March 2022 aged 72.

== Bibliography ==
- 2011 - The Ballroom – The Melbourne Punk and Post-Punk Scene
- 2014 - The secret love letters : a family history
