= Annese =

Annese is a surname. Notable people with the surname include:

- Gennaro Annese (1604–1648), Italian Revolutionary
- Maurie Annese (born 1971), Australian actor and producer
- Vincenzo Alberto Annese (born 1984), Italian footballer and manager
