= Althoff =

Althoff is a surname. Notable people with the surname include:

- Bobbi Althoff (born 1997), American podcaster and social media personality
- Ernie Althoff, Australian musician
- Friedrich Althoff (1839–1908), Prussian Minister of Culture
- Kai Althoff (born 1966), German painter
- Pamela Althoff (born 1953), Republican Illinois State Senator

== See also ==
- Althoff Studios, an erstwhile (1939–1946) Film Studio in Berlin Babelsberg (Germany), later property of DEFA
- Althoff Catholic high school, high school in Belleville, Illinois
