= Body Melt =

1993 Australian body horror film

- DVD cover
- Directed by: Philip Brophy
- Written by: Rod Bishop; Philip Brophy
- Produced by: Rod Bishop; Daniel Scharf
- Starring: Gerard Kennedy; Andrew Daddo; Ian Smith; Vincent Gil; Regina Gaigalas
- Cinematography: Ray Argall
- Edited by: Bill Murphy
- Music by: Philip Brophy
- Production company: Bodymelt Pty Ltd
- Distributed by: DUMB Films (Australia)
- Release dates: 1993 (Sitges International Fantastic Film Festival); 1994 (Australia)
- Running time: 81 minutes
- Country: Australia
- Language: English
- Budget: AU$1,650,000

Body Melt is a 1993 Australian independent body horror film directed by Philip Brophy and written by Brophy and Rod Bishop. Brophy and Bishop were members of the experimental music group → ↑ →. Brophy also composed the film's score. The movie satirises suburban lifestyles and fitness fads.

== Plot ==
Ryan, an employee of the Vimuville health spa, sets out early one morning to warn the residents of Pebbles Court in the suburb of Homesville in Melbourne that they've been targeted for experiments with their illegal new vitamins. His lover and Vimuville's manager, Shaan, having correctly suspected that he was only using her to find out about her plans, sneakily administers a major overdose of the vitamins to him, causing his body to begin mutating uncontrollably as he nears Pebbles Court. He breaks the speed limits in an attempt to get there alive, and tries to record a warning on a dictaphone, but crashes and is thrown through the windshield of his car, before tentacles sprout from his throat and smother him to death, retreating into his body before the pursuing police can arrive on the scene. Veteran detective Sam Phillips is assigned to investigate, aided by his rookie partner Johnno.

With Ryan dead, and Phillips and Johnno not finding anything untoward in their initial investigation of Vimuville, Shaan is free to continue with her plan to experiment on the residents of Pebbles Court, despite the warnings of her business partner and the local family physician, Dr. Carrera, that they need more time to test the vitamins, which he was one of the main developers of. The first to die is Cheryl Rand, a pregnant young woman whose placenta detaches itself and begins scuttling around their house and attacks her husband Brian, before Cheryl's unborn child explodes, blowing open her stomach and killing her. Brian is wrongly arrested for her murder, and Carrera, having shown up to make a house call on her, takes the opportunity to check in on next-door neighbor Paul Matthews, who was also sent a sample of the vitamins. He finds Matthews with the lower half of his face rotted away, and he attacks Carrera with superhuman strength, ripping off Carrera's ear before the doctor is able to give him a fatal overdose of a sedative. However, Carrera forgets to take the vial of sedative with him when he flees, and the two detectives find it and his ear with Matthews' body.

In the meantime, a subplot sees two young Pebbles Court residents named Sal and Gino try to take a trip to Vimuville to accept an offer to act as sperm donors, but they get lost and end up at a farm owned by a disfigured man named Pud, whose mutated and even more disfigured children eventually kill them. It transpires that Pud is the former colleague of Dr. Carrera, with the mutations of him and his family being the result of experimenting on himself while developing the vitamins, after which he was cut out of any credit for developing them. Carrera shows up to confront him, and Pud reveals that he deliberately omitted a vital part of the vitamin formula from his notes, ensuring that the vitamins would be fatal to anyone who took them.

Shaan, meanwhile, welcomes another set of Pebbles Court residents, the Noble family, and feeds them samples of food illicitly laced with Vimuville's vitamins, though the family's daughter, Elloise refuses to eat it due to being on an organic food diet. Elloise's younger brother Brandon is the first to die, injuring himself in a rollerskating accident, after which his body disintegrates in the course of the night. The rest of the family remain unaware of his demise, and the following morning, the family's father, Thompson develops an uncontrollable sneezing fit which soon causes his head to dissolve into mucus. Elloise tries to get help from Shaan, but finds that she herself has succumbed to the effects of the vitamins, incoherently mumbling Vimuville's slogan with her face half-melted; Elloise tries to get Shaan's attention by slapping her around the face, but this causes Shaan's head to implode, killing her. After she drives to a nearby doctor's surgery with her mother Angelica, Elloise finally realises that the food was spiked with the vitamins, but this comes too late to save Angelica, who dies when her tongue suddenly grows to be several feet long and chokes her to death.

Carrera arrives at Vimuville to find all its employees dead from various mutations, and is cornered by the two detectives in Shaan's office, where he commits suicide by shooting himself in the head. The detectives note that their findings will at least exonerate Brian Rand of murdering his wife, only to return to their police station to find the interior covered in green slime, which Brian, having also consumed the vitamins, projectile vomits until he eventually dies. Inspecting his body, the local coroner dryly notes that a new classification for death, "death of hypernatural causes" has been created as a result of the incident. In the film's closing shot, the vitamins are shown on the shelves of a local store, showing that some of them were sent to retailers before Vimuville was shut down.

== Cast ==
- Gerard Kennedy as Det. Samuel Phillips
- Andrew Daddo as Johnno
- Ian Smith as Dr. Carrera
- Regina Gaigalas as Shaan
- Vincent Gil as Pud
- Neil Foley as Bab
- Anthea Davis as Slab
- Matthew Newton as Bronto
- Lesley Baker as Mack
- Amy Grove-Rogers as Old Woman
- Adrian Wright as Thompson Noble
- Jillian Murray as Angelica Noble
- Ben Geurens as Brandon Noble
- Amanda Douge as Elloise Noble
- Brett Climo as Brian Rand
- Lisa McCune as Cheryl Rand
- Nick Polites as Sal Ciccone
- Maurie Annese as Gino Argento
- William McInnes as Paul Matthews
- Robert Simper as Ryan
- Suzi Dougherty as Kate
- Bill Young as Willie
- Tommy Dysart as Sergeant
- Tiffany Lamb as Secretary

== Production ==
The film was shot in October and November 1992.

The screenplay was developed from four short stories by Brophy. The film was funded by the Australian Film Commission and Film Victoria, and was shot on Super 16 mm film for enlargement to 35 mm. The film's special make-up effects were created by Bob McCarron. Production design was by Maria Kozic, with art direction by Peta Lawson.

== Release ==
Body Melt screened at the Sitges International Fantastic Film Festival and the BFI London Film Festival in 1993. It was first screened at the Melbourne International Film Festival in 1994 and returned to the festival's programme in 2022.

The film received a limited Australian theatrical release through DUMB Films in 1994, followed by a domestic video release through 21st Century.

== Critical reception ==
Martin Unsworth of Starburst praised the film's inventive gore and satirical elements, while noting that its episodic structure sometimes came at the expense of narrative cohesion.

Chris Coffel of Bloody Disgusting described the film as a satire of health and fitness culture, comparing its slapstick gore to the work of Sam Raimi and early Peter Jackson. He also considered the satire relevant beyond the period in which the film was made.

In a 2025 review for Horror Press, Luis Pomales-Diaz praised the practical effects but argued that their excess initially obscured the film's social commentary. He ultimately interpreted the film as an absurdist satire of corporate exploitation and public indifference to institutional wrongdoing.

Film critic Adrian Martin discussed the film's fragmented narrative and spatial construction in programme notes for Cinema Reborn. He also highlighted Brophy's sound design, arguing that its blending of music, ambient sound and bodily effects contributes to the film's disorienting sensory experience.

=== Accolades ===
Award	Category	Subject	Result
AFI Awards (1994)	Best Editing	Bill Murphy	Nominated
AFI Awards (1994)	Best Sound	Philip Brophy, Steve Burgess, Craig Carter and Gary Wilkins	Nominated
AFI Awards (1994)	Best Costume Design	Anna Borghesi	Nominated
Saturn Award	Best Genre Video Release		Nominated
Sitges Film Festival (1993)	Best Film	Philip Brophy	Nominated

== Home media ==
In August 2006, Umbrella Entertainment released Body Melt on DVD in Australia. The release had received an MA 15+ classification from the Australian Classification Board on 21 June 2006. The DVD included the original theatrical trailer, a behind-the-scenes featurette with cast and crew, and a storyboard gallery.

On 25 September 2018, Vinegar Syndrome released Body Melt in North America as a Blu-ray/DVD combo pack, featuring a new 2K restoration from the original 16 mm camera negative.

== See also ==
- Cinema of Australia
