= Equal Local =

Australian synth-pop band

- Origin: Melbourne, Victoria, Australia
- Genres: Minimal wave; post-punk; Synth-pop
- Years active: 1980–1982
- Labels: Missing Link Records; Powderworks Records
- Past members: Bryce Perrin; Dean Richards; Ian Cox; Melissa Webb; Mick Hauser; Philip Jackson; Robin Whittle; Stephen Ewart

Equal Local were an Australian synth-pop band, formed in Melbourne, Victoria in 1980. The original line-up was Dean Richards on guitar, Philip Jackson on synthesisers, trumpet and rhythm generator, Melissa Webb on synthesisers and piano, Bryce Perrin on double bass, and Mick Hauser on saxophone. Richards and Jackson were ex-members of electronic post-punk group Whirlywirld.

== History ==
Equal Local formed in early 1980 and quickly attracted a cult following within Melbourne's Crystal Ballroom scene, appearing on bills alongside fellow synth-pop acts Essendon Airport and Tsk Tsk Tsk, and garnering acclaim from critics such as Clinton Walker, who called them "the best, most important band to emerge in Melbourne since The Birthday Party left for England." Equal Local created avant-garde instrumental music that combined a post-punk edge with elements of cocktail music, jazz and funk, among other genres. Using a computer designed and built for the band by member Robin Whittle, they were also pioneers in the use of programmable beat sequencing software during live performance, predating the release of Fairlight CMI's "Page R" by a couple of years.

When The Birthday Party returned to Melbourne in early 1980 to record their album Prayers on Fire with producer Tony Cohen, Jackson, Hauser and Ewart were invited by the band to contribute horns to two songs: the LP's first single "Nick the Stripper", and "Zoo Music Girl". Also in 1980, Equal Local provided the soundtrack for the documentary Punkline, filmed in the Crystal Ballroom.

Two songs by Equal Local, "Widespread" and "Barren and Wasted", appeared on the fifth edition of the cassette magazine Fast Forward, released in 1981. That year, Equal Local released the EP Madagascar on Missing Link Records, and in 1982, Powderworks Records released their song "12 Ways to Go" as a single. The band toured interstate before disbanding in 1982. That year, a recording of their last ever show, held at the Crystal Ballroom on 29 May 1982, was released as a live album by the cassette label Rash (DECISIONS).

== Discography ==
=== Live albums ===
- How Did We Miss These? (1982) – Rash (DECISIONS)

=== Extended plays ===
- Madagascar (1981) – Missing Link Records

=== Split singles ===
- "12 Ways to Go"/"Yank" (1982) – Powderworks Records

== Bibliography ==
Books

- Walker, Clinton (1996). Stranded: The Secret History of Australian Independent Music, 1977-1991. Pan Macmillan. ISBN 9780732908836.
