= To Hell 'n' Back =

Compilation album by Grong Grong
- Released: December 8, 2009
- Recorded: May 1983 – 1984
- Studio: Various: Hitsville Studios; (Adelaide, Australia); Seaview Ballroom; (Melbourne, Australia); Studio 202; (Adelaide, Australia
- Genre: Garage punk; noise rock
- Length: 75:32
- Label: Memorandum

Grong Grong chronology
Grong Grong (1986)	To Hell 'n' Back (2009)

To Hell 'n' Back is an anthology album of Grong Grong, released on December 8, 2009, by Memorandum Recordings.

== Reception ==
Professional ratings
Review scores
Source	Rating
Allmusic	4/5 stars

AllMusic awarded To Hell 'n' Back four out of five stars, saying "plenty of bands have made music like this that's full of arty calculation, but Grong Grong gave their noises a brutal, purposeful focus and feral passion that was both comic and just a bit scary." Spin and Trouser Press compared the band favorably to Scratch Acid, Killdozer and The Birthday Party and was especially complimentary towards Charles Tolnay's dissonant guitar technique.

== Track listing ==
No.	Title	Writer(s)	Length
1.	"Grong Grong"	Farkas, Klestines, Taskas, Tolnay	4:30
2.	"Angels & Demons"	Farkas, Taskas	5:10
3.	"Club Grotesque"	Farkas, Taskas, Tolnay	4:02
4.	"Louie the Fly"	Taskas, Tolnay	3:41
5.	"Black Hell"	Farkas, Klestines, Taskas, Tolnay	3:58
6.	"Japanese Train Driver"	Klestines, Tolnay	3:20
7.	"Vlad the Impaler"	Tolnay	2:57
8.	"Poor Herb"	Buchan, Tolnay	4:03
9.	"Looking at You" (MC5 cover)	Davis, Kramer, Smith, Thompson, Tyner	3:14
10.	"Who's Got It"	Farkas, Klestines, Taskas, Tolnay	3:43
11.	"The Hills Have Eyes" (The Meteors cover)	Fenech	2:51
12.	"Swine"	Taskas	3:54
13.	"Human Fly" (The Cramps cover)	Purkhiser, Wallace	2:38
14.	"Loose" (The Stooges cover)	Alexander, Asheton, Asheton, Osterberg	2:59
15.	"Hungry Jack McDonald"	Farkas, Klestines, Taskas, Tolnay	3:43
16.	"Meat Axe"	Farkas, Taskas	5:16
17.	"Poor Herb" (The Gongk Show)	Buchan, Tolnay	4:37
18.	"Loose (The Gongk Show)" (The Stooges cover)	Alexander, Asheton, Asheton, Osterberg	3:48
19.	"Grong Grong" (The Gongk Show)	Farkas, Klestines, Taskas, Tolnay	4:15
20.	"Hills Have Eyes" (The Gongk Show)	Fenech	2:53

== Personnel ==
Adapted from the To Hell 'n' Back liner notes.

Grong Grong

- Michael Farkas – lead vocals, saxophone, synthesizer, mixing
- George Klestines – drums, mixing
- Dave Taskas – bass guitar, mixing
- Charles Tolnay – guitar, mixing

Production and design

- Jello Biafra – liner notes
- Caroline Birkett – photography
- Eric Cecil – liner notes
- Andrew DeCaux – cover art, illustrations
- Bruce Griffiths – photography
- Regina Hayson – photography
- Russell Hopkinson – mastering
- Ian Underwood – illustrations, design

== Release history ==
Region	Date	Label	Format	Catalog
Australia	2009	Memorandum	CD	Memo6
