= Maria Kozic =

Australian artist

Maria Kozic (born 10 August 1957) is an Australian feminist painter, sculptor, designer, musician, and video artist originally from Melbourne, who currently lives and works in Brooklyn, New York City. Kozic came to prominence as a member of the Philip Brophy-led experimental art collective → ↑ →, before establishing herself as a leading member of Australia's avant-garde and conceptual art movements in the 1980s and 1990s.

== Career ==
Kozic studied art at the Phillip Institute of Technology in the northern Melbourne suburb of Preston. In 1978, she joined → ↑ → (pronounced tsk tsk tsk), playing synthesiser and singing in the group originally based out of the Clifton Hill Community Music Centre. As a member of → ↑ →, Kozic performed or exhibited post-punk and experimental music, film, and visual art internationally, before Brophy dissolved the group in 1986. Kozic and Brophy continued to collaborate through the 1980s and 1990s.

In 1992, Kozic released the experimental synth-pop album Viral Pulse under the name Maria Kozic and the MK Sound, under Brophy's label Present Records.

As a designer, Kozic has created album artwork for David Chesworth and Essendon Airport. Kozic was the production designer on the 1993 cult body horror comedy film Body Melt, directed by Brophy and co-written by Brophy and Rod Bishop, another former member of → ↑ →.

== Art style and practice ==
Kozic is an interdisciplinary artist whose practice encompasses traditional fine art media including painting, sculpture, photography, printmaking, and drawing, as well as more experimental work in film, video, theatre, performance art, sound, and installation. Critic Adrian Martin described Kozic's work, which is associated with postmodernism and pop art, as "boundlessly clever, witty and inventive."

Kozic adopts a punk or DIY feminist outlook, and often references or re-works pop culture iconography including horror and cult cinema posters, comic books, pop music, and her own artwork. Several of her paintings re-work canonical pieces by celebrated artists such as Andy Warhol, Edvard Munch, and Piet Mondrian.

Kozic has also created installations, including the inflatable sculpture Blue Boy (1992), which was affixed to the roof of the Museum of Contemporary Art, Sydney. In 1990, she installed billboards featuring photographs of herself and the words "Maria Kozic Is BITCH" in prominent locations throughout inner Sydney and Melbourne. This work, Maria Kozic Is BITCH, became an iconic work of Australian feminist art.

== Exhibitions ==
As a member of → ↑ →, Kozic participated in a range of major contemporary art exhibitions in Australia. Her first solo exhibition, Maria Kozic, was staged in 1988 at the Institute of Modern Art, Brisbane. Her artwork has been exhibited across Australia, including at the National Gallery of Victoria, Queensland Art Gallery, Art Gallery of NSW, Museum of Contemporary Art, Australian Centre for Contemporary Art, Heide Museum of Modern Art, as well as at galleries and museums in London, New York and Paris.
