= Grong Grong (band) =

Australian punk rock band

- Origin: Adelaide, South Australia, Australia
- Genres: Grunge; noise rock; punk rock; garage punk; garage rock
- Years active: 1982–1984; 2009–2013
- Labels: Aberrant; Alternative Tentacles; Memorandum; No Patience
- Past members: Michael Farkas; George Klestinis; David Taskas; Charles Tolnay; Nathan Dale; Michael Wilczek; Patrick Kavanagh

Grong Grong were a punk rock band from Adelaide, South Australia. They formed in 1982 with Michael Farkas on vocals, synthesiser and saxophone, his half-brother Charlie Tolnay on guitar, George Klestinis on drums, and Dave Taskas on bass guitar. They disbanded in late 1984 after Farkas had overdosed and lapsed into a drug-induced coma for nine months. He recovered and worked in other bands including Hack. Grong Grong reformed in 2009 with Farkas, Klestinis and Tolnay joined by Nathan Dale on bass guitar; but disbanded again in 2013. They issued a self-titled album in 1984 and a live album, Live at the Sound Lounge, in 2014.

== History ==
=== Early years (1982–84) ===
Grong Grong were named after Michael Farkas consumed acid on a road trip from Adelaide to Sydney. After losing his grip on reality, he arrived in the rural village Grong Grong, which Farkas found hilarious. While in Sydney trying to get in a club for free, he pretended to be in a band, Grong Grong, to gain access. The ruse worked and he decided the name was lucky.

In Adelaide in 1982 Grong Grong were started by Farkas on lead vocals, synthesiser and sometimes saxophone, his half-brother Charlie Tolnay on guitar, George Klestinis on drums (ex-Perdition), and Dave Taskas on bass guitar (ex-Blood Sport). They drew upon influences of the Birthday Party, the Pop Group, the Stooges and Pere Ubu. They made their performance debut at a party in February 1983. Their harsh and brutal sound met with extreme reaction. In May of that year Grong Grong won a free recording session during a local radio telethon. They recorded four tracks meant for release as a demo.

After supporting Melbourne band, Corpsegrinders, Grong Grong took a support slot for the Dead Kennedys at the Thebarton town hall in 1983. They impressed that group's singer, Jello Biafra, "I lay awake for about two nights after seeing [them], still wondering if I actually saw what I really saw." Biafra signed Grong Grong to Alternative Tentacles and financed their first album. He later collaborated with Tolnay on the album, Tumor Circus, and he signed Farkas' later band, Hack, to Alternative Tentacles.

On Christmas Day 1984, Farkas went into a drug-induced coma, which lasted nine months. Though he recovered, the band had split up. As of 2013 Grong Grong are one of two Australian bands to sign with Alternative Tentacles (the other is Hack). Klestinis and Tolnay formed King Snake Roost in Adelaide in 1985, they were briefly joined by Taskas in 1987. Farkas recovered and worked in other bands including Hack.

Their self-titled debut album was released posthumously in 1986. It comprised a studio side of four tracks recorded from July to October 1983 and a live side of five tracks recorded at the Seaview Ballroom, Melbourne in October 1983. An expanded, remastered version of 20 tracks, with an additional 17-track DVD disc, was issued in 1998 via Memorandum Recordings. Australian musicologist, Ian McFarlane, observed, "[they] were the original post-punk, grunge noise terrorists... [their] brand of psychotic, swamp rock was akin to a Mac truck driving slowly through a china shop while the Cramps' 'I Ain't Nothing but a Gorehound' blasted out over a nearby PA system!"

=== Reformation (2009–13) ===
In 2009 original members Farkas, Tolnay and Klestinis reunited with the assistance of Nathan Dale on bass, a former member of Farkas' band Hack. Memorandum Records released a compilation album, To Hell 'n' Back. The reformed group embarked on a tour of Australia's eastern states. On return to Adelaide Klestinis returned to his career as a DJ and film maker and was replaced on drums by Michael Wilczek, a collaborator with Dale in Peterhead, White Tiger and Glamville. Wilczek performed his first gig with the band without rehearsal and improvised his way through a 15-song set, the next night week departing on tour to Melbourne.

Since 2009 Grong Grong has played across Australia, with gigs in Melbourne, Sydney, Brisbane, Newcastle and Geelong, and supported Biafra and his Guantanamo School of Medicine, re-establishing their connection after 30 years. A live performance by Grong Grong at 3D Radio on 27 October 2013 was issued posthumously in the following year as Live at the Sound Lounge.

Grong Grong are and influence on noise rock, they were one of the first bands to refer to the term, grunge. They contributed to the Australian "Swamp Rock" genre, which later influenced/mutated into the Black Eye scene in Sydney and is a contributor to the Pigfuck sound popularised in the United States.

Guitarist Charlie Tolnay passed away in Pennington, South Australia on 15th September 2017.

== Members ==
- Michael Farkas – lead vocals, synthesiser, saxophone (1982–84, 2009–13)
- George Klestinis – drums (1982–84, 2009)
- David Taskas – bass guitar (1982–84, 2009–13)
- Charles Tolnay – guitar (1982–84, 2009–13; died 2017)
- Nathan Dale – bass guitar (2009–13)
- Michael Wilczek – drums (2010–13)
- Patrick Kavanagh

== Discography ==
=== Albums ===
- Grong Grong (1986) – Aberrant (Grunt1), Alternative Tentacles (Virus049)
- To Hell 'n' Back (compilation, 2009) – Memorandum (Memo6)
- Live at the Sound Lounge (live, 2014)
