= Essendon Airport (band) =

Australian band

- Origin: Melbourne, Victoria, Australia
- Genres: Electronic; post-punk
- Years active: 1978–1983; 2003; 2011; 2022–present
- Labels: Innocent; Chapter Music
- Members: David Chesworth; Robert Goodge; Paul Fletcher; Barbara Hogarth; Graham Lee
- Past members: Ian Cox; Phil Bywater

Essendon Airport is an Australian electronic music, post-punk group formed in 1978 which explored experimental minimalist and funk music. Founding mainstays were the duo of David Chesworth on electric piano and drum machine and Robert Goodge on guitar. They were joined in late 1980 by Ian Cox on saxophone and Paul Fletcher on drums.

In 1982 they added Barbara Hogarth on bass guitar but disbanded in the following year. The group issued a four-track extended play, Sonic Investigations (Of the Trivial) (May 1980), and a studio album, Palimpsest (May 1982). They reformed as the original duo line-up for occasional performances in 2003 after the issue of a compilation album, Sonic Investigations of the Trivial. A new double CD version of Palimpsest, and other live material, was released by Chapter Music in August 2011.

In September 2022, the group released their first new music in 40 years, with the double-A 7" single "Agua Por Favor"/"Ten Thousand Steps", featuring vocalist Anne Cessna. Their second studio album, MOR, followed in 2025.

== History ==
=== 1978–80: Formation to Sonic Investigations ===
Formed in Melbourne, Essendon Airport began as an instrumental electronic music duo in 1978 by Robert Goodge on lead guitar and David Chesworth on Wurlitzer electric piano and a home made drum machine, bought via the Trading Post. Both members lived in or near the suburb of Essendon, and took the name of Essendon Airport which since 1971 was no longer an international terminal (replaced by Melbourne Airport in Tullamarine).

The duo version released a four-track extended play, Sonic Investigations (Of the Trivial), in May 1980 on Innocent Records. The duo described the EP's tracks, "songs which combine many of the most facile and insipid kinds of music in a redeemingly dignified manner... creating new trivia out of old. All this takes place along with a kind of pedantic fetishism for small-repetition games - the music travels in circles, spirals and solid blocks of sameness and difference." The label, Innocent Records, was co-owned by Chesworth and Philip Brophy (of performance group, → ↑ →).

Essendon Airport followed with a single, "Talking to Cleopatra" (September 1980), with Anne Cessna (a.k.a. Anne Sanger) on lead vocals. Sanger later recalled working with the duo, "we were sitting around one night when Robert and David were tossing around the idea of recording a single with a vocalist. But who should that be? I said I'd do it. I was partly being facetious. I wasn’t at all sure I could sing. Neither were they." According to theMusic.com.au's writer, "[it] went on to be something of a cult favourite among the Melburnian alt-music scene of the early 1980s."

This incarnation of Essendon Airport is less well known than later versions of the group, but performaned at venues around Melbourne including the Clifton Hill Community Music Centre and supports at the Crystal Ballroom where they supported acts such as Midnight Oil and Jimmy and the Boys.

=== 1980–83: Palimpsest to break-up ===
Late in 1980 Essendon Airport became a four-piece, adding Ian Cox on saxophone and Paul Fletcher on drums. They performed around Melbourne's newly emerging post-punk inner-city venues such as the Crystal Ballroom, various galleries such as the George Paton, and the Clifton Hill Community Music Centre (CHCMC), a venue for experimental music, performance and film during this time. They worked closely with → ↑ →.

Embellished with Fletcher's arrhythmic drumming and Ian Cox' sweet, brittle saxophone, the four-piece provided a range of styles from extreme minimalism to plundering the hidden resonances in the popular song. Examples can be heard on the debut studio album, Palimpsest (Innocent Records), which appeared in May 1982. The group also made recordings for the Fast Forward cassette magazine and a disc give-away for the Art Network magazine.

Adding bass player Barabara Hogarth (from Government Drums with Willy Zygier and Richard Pleasance), the group developed material with a funk feel and performed head-lining shows at the Jump Club, and Crystal Ballroom, and toured to Sydney. Australian musicologist, Ian McFarlane, described the five-piece line-up, "[they] played a hybrid of modern jazz, rock and funk." No recordings by the quintet were released until 2011, when the 2× CD version of Palimpsest included live and studio tracks, including a live-to-air performances on 3RRR FM from the Crystal Ballroom which was their final performance. The group disbanded in mid-1983.

After the dissolution of Essendon Airport, Chesworth continued performing as a soloist and in 1985 formed a new group, Whaddya Want?, with Warwick Bone on synthesiser, Phillip Jackson (ex-Whirlywirld, Equal Local) on synthesiser, Bill McDonald on bass guitar and Michael Sheridan on lead guitar. Goodge, Cox and Hogarth formed the nucleus of the successful pop-funk band, I'm Talking in late 1983, which included Kate Ceberano as lead vocalist. Three years after the dissolution of I'm Talking, Cox, Chesworth and Goodge collaborated again, in 1990, in the group, Power Trip featuring Mr Larry Weems, alongside John Course, Angus Davidson, Mark Forrester, John McCall and Simon Polinski. Chesworth later formed the instrumental group, the David Chesworth Ensemble, for which Goodge has occasionally performed.

=== 2003–present: Reformations ===
In 2003, a compilation CD was released via Chapter Music entitled Sonic Investigations of The Trivial, comprising live and studio recordings of the duo from 1978-1980. Following this release Essendon Airport have given occasional performances in their original duo guise. They perform their original music having painstakingly transferred the drum machine sounds from old tapes onto computer and have also added some new pieces. Graham Lee (ex-The Triffids) has been accompanying them on pedal-steel guitar. In 2011 Chapter Music reissued Palimpsest as a 2× CD with additional live tracks, and a four-piece version with Chesworth, Fletcher and Goodge were joined by Phil Bywater to perform live in support of the release. Bywater stood in for original saxophonist Ian Cox.

In September 2022, the group released the double-A 7" single "Agua Por Favor"/"Ten Thousand Steps", featuring vocalist Anne Cessna, and artwork by Paul Fletcher. In October 2025, the group released their second studio album, MOR, as a limited edition vinyl release. The album revisits early material from the Sonic Investigations era with an expanded line-up of musicians, and also features one newly written song, "Malibu".

== Members ==
- David Chesworth – Wurlitzer electric piano, keyboard, drum machine, vocals (1978–83, 2003, 2011, 2022-present)
- Robert Goodge – guitar (1978–83, 2003, 2011, 2022-present)
- Ian Cox – saxophone (1980–83)
- Paul Fletcher – drums (1980–83, 2011, 2025-present)
- Barbara Hogarth – bass guitar (1982–83, 2025-present)
- Graham Lee – pedal steel guitar (2005–10, 2022-present)
- Phil Bywater – saxophone (2011)
- Mia Alexander – saxophone (2026)

== Discography ==
=== Albums ===
List of albums, with selected details
Title	Details
Palimpsest	Released: 1982; Format: LP; Label: Innocent Records
MOR	Released: 2025; Format: LP, digital; Label: Chapter Music

=== Extended plays ===
List of EPs, with selected details
Title	Details
Sonic Investigations (Of the Trivial)	Released: 1979; Format: 7" EP; Label: Innocent Records

=== Singles ===
List of singles, with selected details
Title	Year	Album
"Talking to Cleopatra" (by Anne Cessna & Essendon Airport)	1980	non album single
"Agua Por Favor"/"Ten Thousand Steps" (featuring Anne Cessna)	2022	non album single

=== Compilation albums ===
List of compilations, with selected details
Title	Details
Sonic Investigations of the Trivial	Released: 2003; Format: CD; Label: Chapter Music; Features the Sonic Investigations (of the Trivial) EP with additional tracks

== Awards and nominations ==
=== AIR Awards ===
The Australian Independent Record Awards (commonly known informally as AIR Awards) is an annual awards night to recognise, promote and celebrate the success of Australia's Independent Music sector.

Year	Nominee / work	Award	Result	Ref.
2026	MOR	Best Independent Electronic Album or EP	Nominated	
