= Wicked Voice =

Compilation album by David Chesworth
- Released: 2001
- Genre: Classical
- Label: ABC Classics
- Producer: David Chesworth; Peter Taplin; Stephen Snelleman

Wicked Voice, subtitled Songs, arias and humorous refrains, is a 2001 album by David Chesworth. The album is a collection of tracks from his earlier works Insatiable, Sabat Jesus, Call of the Wild, Lacuna and The Two Executioners. It was nominated for the ARIA Music Award for Best Original Show/Cast Album in 2001.

The Australian's Deborah Jones says "As well as a gift for melody, Chesworth shows a delight in regular, pulsating rhythms and intriguing textures involving a mix of voice, instruments, real-life sounds and synthesisers." Roger Covell in The Sydney Morning Herald wrote "Not everything in this piece is equally arresting, but it is rarely less than interesting. Chesworth in general persuades a listener that his musical choices represent a series of genuine personal impulses, mixing pop, historical and concert-hall styles and resources, rather than any particular desk-bound credo."

== Track listing ==
Sabat Jesus (1990)

1. To the Gods
2. Speaking
3. Alone
4. Without a Name
5. A Stranger That You Know
6. Crash
7. Angels of the Everyday
8. Travelling the Sky

Call of the Wild (1988)

9. Third Song

Lacuna (1992)

10. Glink

The Two Executioners (1994)

11. Apprehensive Arrival
12. Wonderful Life
13. Death
14. Mr Jean Lagune
15. A Moment of Change
16. Marceline

Insatiable (1985)

17. The Lover At Night
18. Transition 1
19. Sentiment Is a By-product
20. I Wish Therefore I Am
21. Transition 2
22. Your Arrival, Your Return or Your Death
23. I Must Go
24. A Lover's Discourse
25. Life Incomplete
26. Final Act
