= Haydaze =

Australian children's television series

Haydaze is an Australian children's television series that first screened on the Ten Network in 1990. The thirteen part series follows the lives of the Carmichael family, an old family of pioneering stock, who clash with the city bred Simmons family, who buy the neighbouring farm to get "back to basics".

Haydaze was produced by Paul Barron, directed by Paul Moloney and David Rapsey and written by Glenda Hambly, David Rapsey and John Rapsey.

== Cast ==
- Bartholomew John as John Carmichael
- Darren Kelly as Mark Carmichael
- Annie Murtagh-Monks as Annie Carmichael
- Shannon Armstrong as Linda Carmichael
- Brayden West as Sean Carmichael
- Robert Van Mackelenberg as Perry Simmons
- Vivienne Garrett as Jill Simmons
- Denise Vose as Rebecca Simmons

== International ==
The series was shown in Germany as Rebecca und die Jungen von nebenan (Rebecca and the boys next door).

== See also ==
- List of Australian television series
