= Ernie Althoff =

Australian artist

Ernie Althoff is an Australian musician, composer, instrument builder, and visual artist. He was born in Mildura, Victoria in 1950.

== Career ==
He was involved in the Clifton Hill Community Music Centre during the late 1970s and early 1980s. Althoff began exhibiting his music machines instruments in 1981, though his larger installation exhibits began in 1988. Althoff has made graphic scores for other musicians to play his instruments, which often sound different each time they are 'played'.

Besides numerous tracks on compilations since the late 1970s, Althoff has released three full-length solo albums. Althoff's For two on blue piece was recorded live on 23 September 1987 at the ABC's Broadcast Music Department and on 24 November 1987 was aired on ABC-FM's Audio Spectrum program. Althoff's 1999 Heliosonics album is a collection of sounds from solar powered machines. The making of this album was supported by The Australia Council's New Media Arts Fund. Warren Burt wrote in his Chroma review of the album, Ernie is out there with the real thing, the unpredictability of physical systems and the real world, making a music that is both intricate and complex, and yet open and calming as well.

Larry Wendt, in his article in Continuum Journal in 1994, described Althoff as a 'sonic nomad' for being a modern composer who works with both electrical based instruments and acoustic instruments and wrote that 'he has had an active career as a sonic "explorer" and performer since 1978'.

Gail Priest, in her 2006 RealTime review of his performance at the Mistral installation at Artspace, described Ernie Althoff's process as, 'Althoff's materials are basic: wood, metal, glass, plastic. He creates relations between the materials setting them in motion either through his own actions or in the use of small motors in order to create a shifting sonic percussive landscape underpinned by a humming drone.

== Discography ==
- Kerosene Replaced by Gas Freeform Vocal Trio for Handheld Instruments (I.D.A), New Music 1978/79, Innocent Records _{NON 007} (1980)
- Metal Motor Music Art Network Music Supplement, issue 6, Flexi Disc _{AN 001} (1982)
- Music Machines NMATAPES 2, NMA Publications, Melbourne (1983)
- Divide by 4? No, Divide by 3 (I.D.A), Composing for Radio, Public Broadcasting Association of Australia, (cassette) (1983)
- The Way I See It / You've Got the Option C60 Cassette, NMA Publications (1985)
- Any Questions? NMATAPES 5, NMA Publications (1987)
- Music Machines From the Pages of Experimental Musical Instruments vol 2, Experimental Musical Instruments, Nicasio, California (1987)
- Tea party, Currawong bush park installation and In the corner, Sound in space (CD), Museum of Contemporary Art, Sydney (1995)
- Best intentions (E.Althoff and G. Davis), Frog Peak collaborative project (CDx2) Frog Peak Music, U.S.A. (1998)
- Heliosonics NMA Publications _{NMACD 9904} (1999)
- Music For Seven Metal Machines Pedestrian Tapes _{PX 037} (March 1990)
- For Two on Blue NMA, cassette (1990)
- David and Frederick (Track 6), Soundcapsule 1 Realtime Arts (2009)
