= Roslyn Oxley =

Australian gallerist and art dealer

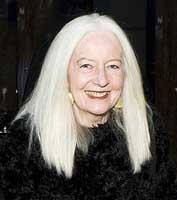
- Roslyn Oxley
- Born: Sydney, New South Wales, Australia
- Father: John Robert Walton

Roslyn Oxley is an Australian gallerist and art dealer. With her husband Tony Oxley, she owns and operates Roslyn Oxley9 Gallery, which opened in March 1982 with an exhibition by Gareth Sansom. In January 2013, Roslyn Oxley, together with Tony Oxley was awarded the Medal of the Order of Australia for her services to the visual arts and the community. Roslyn Oxley is considered one of the most influential gallerists in Australia, supporting the cause of contemporary art, ‘including that which is non-commercial and otherwise challenging’.

== Early life ==
Roslyn Oxley was born in Sydney as Roslyn Walton and is the daughter of John Robert Walton, founder of the Australian department store Waltons. From 1957 to 1960, Oxley studied art and design at East Sydney Technical College, now the National Art School. For the next two decades she worked as an interior designer in Sydney, Melbourne and New York City for firms and designers including Peddle Thorp & Walker (now PTW Architects and Raymond Loewy). In 1970 she married Anthony Oxley and together they co-founded Roslyn Oxley9 Gallery in 1982.

== Philanthropy ==
In January 2013, Roslyn and Tony Oxley were also awarded the Medal of the Order of Australia for their services to the visual arts and the community.
