= Grong Grong (album) =

Studio album by Grong Grong
- Released: May 5, 1986
- Recorded: July – October 1983
- Studio: Seaview Ballroom (Melbourne)
- Genre: Garage punk; noise rock
- Length: 34:46
- Label: Aberrant

Grong Grong chronology
Grong Grong (1986)	To Hell 'n' Back (2009)

Grong Grong is the eponymously titled debut studio album of Grong Grong, released in 1986 by Aberrant Records.

== Reception ==
Professional ratings
Review scores
Source	Rating
Allmusic	2/5 stars

Allmusic awarded Grong Grong two out of five possible stars. Spin compared the band favorably to The Birthday Party, saying "Grong's sound screeches and shimmers smoothly in vibrato-drowned squiggles" and that the songs "only hint at the dark, heavy, and twisted minds behind this flat black slab." Deborah Sprague of Trouser Press was especially complimentary towards guitarist Charles Tolnay, saying "where his fine abstract-expressionist guitar mist was subordinate to a series of overly pious Birthday Party eulogies like "Poor Herb" and "Louise the Fly."

== Track listing ==
Studio Side
No.	Title	Lyrics	Music	Length
1.	"Grong Grong"	Farkas, Klestines, Taskas, Tolnay	Farkas, Klestines, Taskas, Tolnay	4:28
2.	"Angels & Demons"	Farkas	Taskas	5:10
3.	"Club Grotesque"	Farkas	Taskas, Tolnay	4:01
4.	"Louie the Fly"	Taskas	Tolnay	3:39

Live Side
No.	Title	Lyrics	Music	Length
1.	"Poor Herb"	Buchan	Tonlay	2:50
2.	"Looking at You" (MC5 cover)	Davis, Kramer, Smith, Thompson, Tyner	Davis, Kramer, Smith, Thompson, Tyner	3:03
3.	"The Hills Have Eyes" (The Meteors cover)	Fenech	Fenech	2:46
4.	"Who's Got It"	Farkas	Tolnay	3:45
5.	"Vlad the Impaler"	Tolnay	Tolnay	4:04

== Personnel ==
Adapted from the Grong Grong liner notes.

Grong Grong

- Michael Farkas – lead vocals, saxophone, synthesizer, mixing
- George Klestines – drums, mixing
- Dave Taskas – bass guitar, mixing
- Charles Tolnay – guitar, mixing

Production and design

- Andrew DeCaux – cover art, illustrations
- Regina Hayson – photography
- Patrick O'Pillage (O'Pillage) – design

== Release history ==
Region	Date	Label	Format	Catalog
Australia	1986	Aberrant	LP	Grunt1
United States	1986	Alternative Tentacles	LP	VIRUS 49
