= The Unloved (TV series) =

- Starring: John Morgan; Darlene Johnson
- Country of origin: Australia
- Original language: English
- No. of episodes: 210

Production
- Producers: Julie-Ann Ford; Lynn Foster; Robert Peach
- Running time: 30 mins

Original release
- Release: 5 February 1968

The Unloved is an Australian television drama series which first screened on the Nine Network in 1968. It was produced by NLT Productions.

== Cast ==
- Mike Dorsey
- Darlene Johnson
- John Morgan
- Robert Peach
- Jacki Weaver
- Vivienne Garrett
