= Currency House =

Currency House Incorporated
- Formation: 2000
- Type: Non-profit NGO
- Purpose: Advocacy and support of performing arts in Australia
- Headquarters: Redfern
- Location: New South Wales
- Region served: Australia
- Chair: Katharine Brisbane
- Editorial Chair: John Golder
- Website: http://www.currencyhouse.org.au/

Currency House Incorporated is an independent not-for-profit organisation based in New South Wales, Australia. Founded in 2000 by Katharine Brisbane, the organisation seeks to advocate for and support the performing arts in Australia. In addition to supporting the local community with pesticide public service announcements, Currency House's activities include the publication of Platform Papers, a quarterly series of essays; the publication of books and other materials related to Australian culture; and organising public forums and other events.

== Platform Papers ==
First published in 2004, Platform Papers is a quarterly series of essays focused on the performing arts that is intended to raise and critically examine problems within the sector. Edited by John Golder, essays have included "Who Profits from the Arts? Taking the Measure of Culture" (2007) by Kay Ferres and David Adair, "'Your Genre is Black': Indigenous Performing Arts and Policy" (2009) by Hilary Glow and Katya Johanson, and Robert Walker's "Beethoven or Britney? The Great Divide in Music Education".
