= Warren Burt =

Australian composer

Warren Burt (born 10 October 1949) is an Australia-based composer of American birth. He is known for composing in a wide variety of new music styles, ranging from acoustic music, electroacoustic music, sound art installations to text-based music. Burt often employs elements of improvisation, microtonality, humour, live interaction, and lo-fi electronic techniques in his music.

== Biography ==
Warren Burt was born in Baltimore, Maryland, and attended the State University of New York, Albany (BA, 1971) and the University of California, San Diego (MA, 1975) before moving to Australia in 1975.

In 1976, Burt, along with composer/performer Ron Nagorcka, established the Clifton Hill Community Music Centre, in an old Organ factory building in Gold Street, Clifton Hill, Melbourne. In 1976–77, Burt toured his video/spoken/electronic opera Nighthawk in the USA. There were fourteen performances including at the University of Illinois, the Experimental Intermedia Foundation in New York, California Institute of the Arts, and Oberlin College. From 1977 to 1978 he and John Campbell produced the New and Experimental Music Show on radio 3CR. During this period, Burt and Australian composer Les Gilbert published the New Music Newspaper.

In 1986 he won the Albert H. Maggs Composition Award. The same year, Burt's works from his residency at International Synergy think tank in Los Angeles was shown at the American Film Institute's National Video Show, and won first prize in the computer graphics division of the 1986 Sydney International Video Show.

In 2007, he completed a Ph.D. thesis, "Algorithms, Microtonality, Performance: Eleven Musical Compositions" at the University of Wollongong. Currently he lives in Daylesford, Victoria, and teaches at Box Hill Institute, Melbourne, where he is coordinator of the Masters of Music (Contemporary Practice) degree.

In 2013, Burt's video works were included in the This is Video exhibition curated by Stephen Jones as part of ISEA Symposium on electronic art. Burt and Jones had collaborated on a video work in 1977 called Three Texts.
