= Maurie Annese =

Australian actor and producer

- Occupations: Producer, actor
- Known for: Body Melt

Maurie Annese is an Australian actor and producer.

He most recently starred in and co-produced I Can't Believe it's Not Countdown, it's a Musical Comedy, in collaboration with Brian Mannix and Crown Entertainment.

In 2002 during Melbourne's Mid Summer Festival he produced the sell out hit musical “I Should Be So Lucky” at Chapel Off Chapel in collaboration with writer, director and co-producer David Knox.

Recent television appearances include playing the character Sophos in Dead Gorgeous (2010), the Rush episode "Freedom" and as host in his own T.V show in 2004, The National Karaoke Challenge on SBS.

He has appeared in a number of films, most notably Body Melt (1993), Love and Other Catastrophes (1996) and My Brother Jack (2001).

https://www.ausstage.edu.au/pages/event/14528
