= Rex Cramphorn =

Australian theatre director

- Rex Cramphorn, 1975
- Born: Rex Roy Cramphorn; 10 January 1941; Brisbane, Australia
- Died: 22 November 1991 (aged 50); Sydney, Australia
- Education: University of Sydney, University of Queensland, National Institute of Dramatic Art, Australian Film, Television and Radio School
- Occupations: Theatre director, playwright, costume designer, theatre critic, theorist, translator, lighting designer, set designer

Rex Roy Cramphorn (sometimes identified by the variant Cramphorne) (10 January 1941 – 22 November 1991) was an Australian theatre director, playwright, costume designer, theatre critic, theorist and translator, active in the 1970s and 1980s. additional he also served as an assistant stage manager and lighting and set designer.

== Freelance director and theatre critic ==
Cramphorn was one of a generation of theatre directors who emerged in Australia in the 1960s. He aspired to establish a permanent Australian performance ensemble, multi-skilled and committed, such as had been done by the Polish theatre director Jerzy Grotowski with whom he worked for a time, but there was not the audience, the assured funding nor the interest in Cramphorn's preference for non-commercial projects to achieve this.

As a freelance director he was involved in some 55 theatre productions around Australia in the 1970s and 1980s. He was resident director at Melbourne's Playbox Theatre in the early 1980s.

The best of Cramphorn's theatre productions were said to be the equal of any Grotowski production; in others it was evident that Cramphorn seemed to demand almost as much of his audience as he did of his players. In a 1973 interview, Cramphorn described the kind of productions he hoped to create:

I’m not interested in presenting the violence of life around me or its chaos and doubt. I’m interested, in a very simple-minded and romantic way, in things that confirm one’s faith in something – whether it be a thing as abstract as the skill of story-telling or whether it be a story like “The Tempest” about a personal and spiritual development. The theatre that I like to see and I’d like to make is outside reality. I’d like it to be an artistic whole, to have the kind of discipline that ballet and opera have. So I think I work in reaction to the life around me.

As a theatre critic during the early 1970s, Cramphorn contributed 110 theatre reviews to several newspapers. In these forthright, uncompromising and scholarly reviews, Cramphorn indicated initially that there was little that pleased him in the Sydney theatre scene, a view summarised by his metaphor "a withering mistletoe on our gum-tree culture". He hailed, however, the emergence of new talents such at Louis Nowra and John Bell.

== Costume designer ==
Cramphorn designed the costumes for the musical Jesus Christ Superstar and many of his own productions. One of Cramphorn's earliest projects was at the 1968 Festival of Perth, where he designed the costumes for Aarne Neeme and Philip Parsons’ production of Richard III at the New Fortune Theatre (University of Western Australia).

== Personal life ==
Cramphorn was born in Brisbane, Australia and attended Brisbane Boys' College. His tertiary education was at the University of New South Wales: MA in Drama, University of Queensland: BA Hons in French and English studies, graduate of the National Institute of Dramatic Art: 1967 (named as Cramphorne) and the Australian Film TV and Radio school.

Many men and women fell for Cramphorn. His capacity for empathising with actors, encyclopaedic knowledge especially of all things French, and "large pocket-Adonis" good looks prompted many to seek his personal commitment. Most remained his friends, however, long after he had persuaded them, gently, that they could be no more than that. At age 20 he inspired a poem containing this stanza:

You may love the boy and lay him naked across your knees and kiss him and make him laugh but it isn't you he sees

== Death and commemoration ==
Cramphorn died in Sydney, 22 November 1991 of AIDS related causes, aged 50. Glowing tributes and obituary notices began to appear, in contrast to the faltering recognition Cramphorn had received in life. In them may be read assessments such as:

- this most intelligent, gentle and well-read of Australian directors
- the only real philosopher the Australian theatre has produced
- Australian theatre has lost one of its most challenging and sensitive talents
- that rare and important figure, a philosopher and visionary of the arts
- the most formally innovative director this country has ever produced
- the most original director of his generation, and certainly the most rigorous and uncompromising.
- I had the pleasure of working with Rex on several projects and will certainly add to this tribute.

Among Cramphorn's effects were thirty boxes of papers which he bequeathed to the Department of Performance Studies at the University of Sydney. Selections from this archive form the basis for Associate Professor Ian Maxwell's publication A Raffish Experiment – The Selected Writings of Rex Cramphorn published by Currency Press in 2009.

A biennial $30,000 Rex Cramphorn Theatre Scholarship has been established by the New South Wales Government. and the Australian Film TV and Radio school. An annual series of Rex Cramphorn lectures – a memorial set up by his friends and colleagues - was begun in 1995, Jim Sharman giving the first lecture.

A studio in the University of Sydney's Centre for Performance Studies has been named in his honour (popularly known as "The Rex").
