= Vivienne Shark LeWitt =

Australian artist (born 1956)

Vivienne LeWitt
- Born: 1956 (age 69–70); Sale, Victoria
- Education: Bachelor of Fine Art at University of Tasmania, PHD of Fine Arts at Alexander Mackie College Sydney
- Known for: Painting and illustrative work

Vivienne Shark LeWitt (born 1956) is an Australian painter and illustrator from Sale, Victoria, iconic for her witty and subversive allegorical art style that explores the human experience. She continues to create art and is living and working in Melbourne, Australia.

== Overview ==
LeWitt became educated at the University of Tasmania School of Art in 1978, beginning her career in visual arts before attaining a Diploma of Fine Art at Alexander Mackie College, Sydney in 2023. Her art uses illustrations intermixed with wordplay to engage the viewer in allegorical narratives that combine humour with social critique. Known for the witty and subersive character of her work, LeWitt asks moral questions about the complicated and unintentionally comedic nature of being human.

In an interview LeWitt explained how pre-renaissance imagery and thematic symbolism influenced her illustrations as a result of her passion for art history. The symbolic presence takes predominance in her work, using it "as a vehicle for the exploration of dreams and romantic sentiment". This early career artstyle has reemerged in recent years alongside the occasional use of Biblical connotations or symbolism; her 2023 exhibition 'Sine Proprio' uses spiritual imagery and titles to explore religious poverty in relation to art.

Expressing a longstanding interest in writing and storytelling, LeWitt's art typically engages the viewer with an interplay between the piece and its title in order to add a sense of story or witt to the illustration, which she considers important in order to connect with her audience and communicate humanity. This attracted her to cartoonish genres as movie posters, book covers, or comic images always contain a sense of movement or action as well as a 'duty of meaning'. LeWitt's movement into this cartoon style in the 1990s was inspired by the 'out of register casualness' of watercolour alongside graphic artists such as Andy Warhol. This enabled her to depict banal mundane tasks with humour and lightness accompanied by a 'lemony twist' in the form of a strong ironic presence that makes her work very iconic.

== Career ==
Beginning her artist career in the 1980s, LeWitt worked with and was supported by Melbourne's Australian Print Workshop from 1981 to 1988, alongside winning a VAB Travel Grant in 1983. Her early works are intimate and dreamy, mimicking old medieval and pre-renaissance imagery to create themes of fable, romance, and 'subconscious' symbolic meaning that prompt further deliberation. Intentionally working with simplistic clipped oil on linen, her work deviated from contemporary styles of the era by having small frames and muted, non-aggressive colour pallets.

In the 1990s her creative style shifted as she developed a preference for sparse means, typically working with watercolour and paper despite receiving a VACB Project Grant in 1996. Her illustrations of this era typically depict banal mundane tasks and explore nuances of feeling in our natural comedy of manners. Participating in cartoonish genres, LeWitt's work became increasingly notationally economical, linear, and simplistically elegant in style that converges with light humour. Still focusing on allegory as both means and end, LeWitt's art is described as "a study in the psychology of human relations and the resonance of archetypal truths and meanings".

LeWitt's iconic work has been given exhibitions predominantly in Australian galleries such as the Roslyn Oxley9 Gallery, the Anna Schwartz Gallery, and the National Gallery of Victoria amongst others. Additionally, she has participated in group exhibitions internationally; in 1999 she had works in the Karyn Lovegrove Gallery's 'Spellbound', Los Angeles, in 1985 her work was noted for its unique style in a New York exhibit featuring Australian artists, and in 1984 she participated in the ANZ Art Exhibition in Edinburgh. Her earliest international appearance was at a Paris Museum of Modern Art exhibition 'Le Reve et Le Reel' in 1983.

Now spanning over four decades, her most recent solo exhibition was 'The Wind Cries Mary' in 2025 at the Roslyn Oxley9 Gallery, and in 2024 she worked on a group exhibition for the Adelaide Biennial of Australian Art.
