= Memorandum Recordings =

Memorandum Recordings is an Australian record label dedicated to conserving and archiving important Australian sounds from the brink. It is the inhouse archival imprint for Sydney Distributor, Reverberbation, and reflects the director's keen interest in Australia's rich (and often overlooked) musical past.

Future releases include remastered compilations for Lubricated Goat and The Moodists.

== List of releases ==
No.	Artist	Title	Format	Year	Ref.
01	Toys Went Berserk	The Bitter & The Sweet: Best & Rarest	2× CD	2005	
02	Tactics	The Sound of the Sound, Vol. 1	2× CD	2006	
03	Kryptonics	Rejectionville	2× CD	2007	
04	Tactics	The Sound of the Sound, Vol. 2	2× CD	2008	
05	The Wreckery	Past Imperfect	2× CD	2008	
06	Grong Grong	To Hell 'n' Back	CD/DVD	2009	
07	Chad's Tree	Crossing off the Miles	2× CD	2010	
08	Bloodloss	The Truth Is Marching In (1983–1991)	2× CD	2010	

== See also ==
- List of record labels
