= Philip Brophy =

Australian film director

Philip Brophy, born in Reservoir, Melbourne 1959 is an Australian musician, composer, sound designer, filmmaker, writer, graphic designer, educator and academic.

== Music ==
In 1977, Brophy formed the experimental group → ↑ → more often written (though wrongly) as Tsk Tsk Tsk or Tch Tch Tch, (pronounced tsk tsk tsk) with Ralph Traviato, Alan Gaunt and Leigh Parkhill. Sometimes compared to Andy Warhol's Factory, the group produced experimental music (Brophy on drums or synthesiser), films, videos, and live theatrical performances exploring Brophy's aesthetic and cultural interests, often on a minimal budget. Over the ten years of the group's operation it involved over sixty of Brophy's friends and acquaintances including musician David Chesworth, and visual artists Maria Kozic and Jayne Stevenson. They performed in a wide range of Australian venues including pubs, galleries, university campuses and the Clifton Hill Community Music Centre. They also performed or exhibited in Europe, including London's ICA. Brophy dissolved the group in the late 1980s, issuing a retrospective book "Made by → ↑ →", but continued to work with Kozic for some time.

In 1980, he founded the Innocent Records label with fellow Melbourne musician David Chesworth. Throughout the early 1980s, Brophy wrote numerous compositions and multi-media pieces. During 1985 he was the drummer in Olympic Sideburns. In the late 1990s, Brophy founded the Sound Punch label, and released both solo works, and collaborations with Maria Kozic, Bill McDonald, and fellow RMIT academic Philip Samartzis.

== Film ==
After the dissolution of → ↑ →, with whom Brophy had made numerous collaborative film and video works (including Super-8 and 16mm versions of No Dance), he set his ambitions on making higher budget films, and became more involved in sound design.

In 1988 he made an experimental short film Salt, Saliva, Sperm and Sweat. His first feature film, Body Melt, was released in 1993, and was funded by the Australian Film Commission and Film Victoria. Two short films were produced in 2004, The Sound Of Milk and Words In My Mouth - Voices In My Head (Anna).

== Academia ==
Brophy has had works published in journals such as Virgin Press, Art & Text and Fast Forward and has presented papers at various film conferences since the early 1980s. He began teaching sound and media at the Phillip Institute of Technology in 1982. He began teaching cinema studies at RMIT in 1986.

== Other activities ==
Between 1985 and 2002 he co-presented, with Bruce Milne, the irreverent cultural theory and music radio show Eeek!, on Melbourne radio station 3RRR (102.7 MHz). At the time it was the most popular show on the station. Brophy has regularly written for The Wire magazine about film soundtracks, also Film Comment. He was the director of the Cinesonic International Conference on Film Scores & Sound Design, and has edited three journals from the conference.

He has had two books published by the British Film Institute, including 100 Anime, exploring Japanese animation.

Philip Brophy has also exhibited his artworks in art galleries for exhibitions such as 'Vox' and the Ian Potter Museum of Art at the University of Melbourne.

== Bibliography ==
- Made by → ↑ →, Ed. Philip Brophy, Melbourne, 1983
- Kaboom: Explosive Animation, Ed. Philip Brophy, Museum of Contemporary Art, Sydney, 1994
- Cinesonic: The World of Sound in Film, Ed. Philip Brophy, AFTRS Publishing, Sydney, 1998
- Cinesonic: Cinema and the Sound of Music, Ed. Philip Brophy, AFTRS Publishing, Sydney, 1999
- Cinesonic: Experiencing The Soundtrack, Ed. Philip Brophy, AFTRS Publishing, Sydney, 2002
- 100 Modern Soundtracks, Philip Brophy, BFI, London, 2004
- 100 Anime, Philip Brophy, BFI, London, 2005
- TEZUKA: The Marvel of Manga, Ed. Philip Brophy, National Gallery of Victoria, Melbourne, 2006
- The Adventures of Priscilla, Queen of the Desert – Australian Screen Classics, Philip Brophy, Currency Press, Sydney, 2008
- Philip Brophy: Colour me dead, curated by Bala Starr, Ian Potter Museum of Art, Melbourne, 2013
