= Tobsha Learner =

British/Australian writer

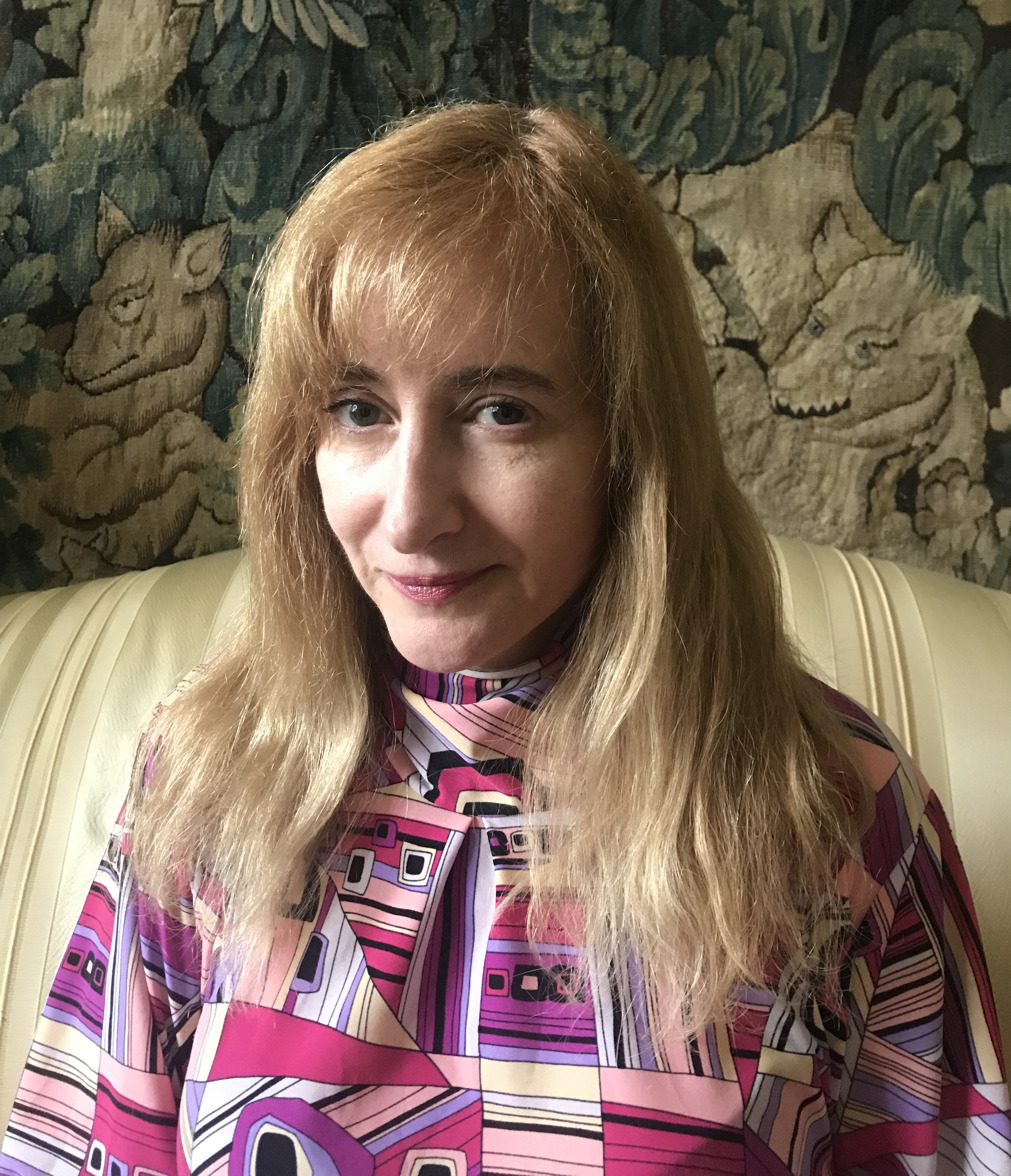
Tobsha Learner

Tobsha Learner is a British/Australian novelist, playwright and screenwriter. Her first collection of short stories, Quiver, sold 150,000 copies worldwide. She has sold over 790 thousand books and is in translation in a number of countries. Her publishers have included Tor US, LittleBrown UK and HarperCollins AU. She is married with three stepsons, and while currently residing in New York has until recently divided her time between London and California.

== Early life ==
Learner was born in Cambridge, England and raised in London. She is the daughter of Anglo-Australian parents: Arnold Learner, an English-born mathematician, who was killed in a motorcycle accident in London at forty and his first wife Eva Learner née Rechts, social worker, feminist and humanist who was born in Palestine then migrated to Australia aged four. Learner's parents moved to England in the late 1950s.

Learner went to Paddington Comprehensive then onto Hornsey College of Art for a Foundation year. During that year she also trained as a marble carver in Carrara, Italy, apprenticed to the Australian sculptor Joel Ellenberg. After which she migrated at eighteen to Melbourne, Australia. She then went to the Victorian College of the Arts to complete a BA in sculpture. But in her second year, began to return to her first love of theatre. Firstly through performance art then playwriting after becoming one of the founders of avant-garde theatre company 'Straight-face Productions.'

In 1989, Learner was one of the founding sponsors of the National Foundation for Australian Women. Her "Literary papers, 1983-1992", are held by the Mitchell Library at the State Library of New South Wales.

After completing her degree she moved to Sydney, where she did a playwright's course at the National Institute of Dramatic Art then on to AFTRS, the Australian Film, Television and Radio School for a screenwriting course.

== Plays ==
=== Plays ===
- Is It Buckskin That Holds the Card?, 1984
- Angels, 1988
- The Waters of Pham Thi Lan, 1994
- Wolf : A Dedication to Priapus, Currency Press, 1992, ISBN 0868193356
- The Glass Mermaid, Currency Press, 1994, ISBN 0868193941
- Les Enfants du Paradis, adaptor of the work by Jacques Prevert, 1988
- Miracles, Currency Press, 1998, ISBN 086819557X
- Seven Acts of Love (as witnessed by a cat), Hilary Linstead & Associates, 1995
- Fidelity, 2004
- Black Wedding, 2009

=== Short plays ===
- Feast, 1993
- The Gun in History, 1994
- Cage, 2017

=== One person plays ===
- Witchplay, Currency Press, 1995, ISBN 0868194182
- Mistress, 1990
- S.N.A.G., 1992
- Homage, 2004

=== Radio plays ===
- Volkov, 1987
- Lionheart, 1992
- Queen Song, Australian Broadcast Corporation, 1996

== Short films ==
- Feast, 1990, directed by Jill Moonie
- Antonio's Angel (original story by Rosalba Clemente)
- Succubus, directed by Harry Weinmann

== Books ==
=== Historical fiction (as Tobsha Learner) ===
- The Witch of Cologne, Forge, 2005, ISBN 0765314304
- Soul, HarperCollins, 2006, ISBN 9780732281090
- The Magick of Master Lilly, Little, Brown Book Group, 2018, ISBN 9780751562125

=== Thrillers (as T.S.Learner) ===
- Sphinx: A Secret for a Thousand Years, HarperCollins, 2009, ISBN 9780732286736, Sphere, Little Brown UK
- The Map: Decipher the Clues, Discover the Truth, HarperCollins, 2012, ISBN 9780732293376
- The Stolen, Sphere, 2014, ISBN 9780751550580

=== Thrillers (as Tobsha Learner) ===
- Madonna Mars : An Erotic Thriller, Viking, 1998, ISBN 0670880345
- Picture This, Unbound, 2016, ISBN 9781911586012

=== Erotic fiction (short story collection) ===
- Quiver: A Book of Erotic Tales, Viking, 1996, ISBN 0670873098
- Tremble: Sensual Fables of the Mystical and Sinister, HarperCollins, 2004, ISBN 0732270634
- Yearn: Tales of Lust and Longing, HarperCollins, 2011, ISBN 9780732291815
