= Ron Nagorcka =

Ron Nagorcka (born 1948) is an Australian composer, didjeridu and keyboard player. Nagorcka has been an important figure in the Australian experimental music scene for some 40 years.

Since 1988 he has been living in Tasmania. He has created a large body of works for sampled bird and animal sounds, conventional instruments, and didjeridu, in large part using complex just intonation systems.
