= Jenny Watson (artist) =

Australian artist (born 1951)

- Born: Jennifer Watson; Melbourne
- Education: National Gallery of Victoria Art School; State College of Victoria
- Style: painting

Jennifer Watson (born 1951) is an Australian artist known for her paintings that combine text and images.

== Biography ==
Jenny Watson was born in Melbourne in 1951 and she lives and works in Samford, Queensland. Her formative years as an artist were in the 1970s in Melbourne and London. In 1972, she completed a Diploma of Painting at the National Gallery of Victoria Art School, Melbourne. In 1973, she completed a Diploma of Education at the State College of Victoria. She had her first solo show in 1973.

Early influences on her practice include conceptual art, feminism and the punk scene in London and Melbourne. Uniquely, her work takes these influences into the domain of figurative painting. She has developed her own visual language that frequently combines text with images. She currently mentors at Queensland College of Art, Griffith University.

== Career ==
Watson came to prominence in Australia during the 1980s, a period in Australian art history when the relationship between word and image, painting and photography, and art and popular culture were important themes. Her work is part of this investigation of ideas about visual representation that characterised conceptualism and critical postmodernism. Both conceptualism and critical postmodernism stress distancing from the subject matter they represent, whether through deadpan presentation of material or an ironic tone, in contrast Watson's practice frequently suggests an intimate or personal approach to her material.

Watson said of her approach: “I quickly realised that being a serious woman artist was not unusual, and with that possibility established, it allowed me to develop the work more radically, away from figuration towards philosophical, conceptual practice, and ultimately towards my own autobiographical take.”

From 1978-1984 Watson was a partner in the Melbourne artist-run gallery Art Projects.

Watson's work has been described as confessional by art historian Benedikt Stegmayer thereby positioning her work alongside the work of younger artists such as Tracey Emin.

In 1993, she represented Australia at the 45th Venice Biennale. In 2017 a major survey of her work was shown at the Museum of Contemporary Art in Sydney and Heide Museum of Modern Art, Melbourne.

== Works ==
- Selected Solo Exhibitions
- 2025: 5 Drawings, Galerie Transit, Belgium
- 2017: Jenny Watson, The Fabric of Fantasy, Museum of Contemporary Art, Sydney, Australia
- 2016: Jenny Watson, Chronicles, Griffith University Art Gallery, Brisbane, Australia
- 2016: Just a Girl, Roslyn Oxley9 Gallery, Sydney, Australia
- 2015: Fabrications, Anna Schwartz Gallery, Melbourne, Australia
- 2014 Garden of Eden and Child's Play, Galerie Transit, Belgium
- Selected Group Exhibitions
- 2016: Painting, More Painting-Chapter 2, Australian Centre for Contemporary Art, Melbourne, Australia
- 2015: Redlands Konica Minolta Art Prize, National Art School, Sydney, Australia
- 2014: Solitaire, Tarrawarra Museum of Art, Healesville, Victoria, Australia
- 2013: Mix Tape 1980s: Appropriation, Subculture, Critical Style, National Gallery of Victoria, Melbourne, Australia
- 2012: Contemporary Australia: Women, Gallery of Modern Art, Brisbane, Australia.
- 2002: Fieldwork: Australian Art 1968 - 2002, National Gallery of Victoria, Federation Square, Melbourne, Australia

== Awards ==
- 1999: Semifinalist, “Parque de la Memoria”, Sculpture Prize, Argentina
- 1997: Residency, Chemnitz, Germany July 1998
- 1997: Residency, College of Fine Arts, Hanoi, Vietnam December 1997 – March 1998
- 1997: Deacons Graham and James/ Arts 21 Award
- 1990: Winner of the Portia Geach Memorial Award
- 1987: Newcastle Art Prize (joint winner with Mike Parr)
- 1986: Gold Medal, Indian Triennale, Delhi
- 1984: Half Standard Grant, Visual Arts Board
- 1980: Grant to Individuals, Visual Arts Board
- 1979: Alliance Francaise Fellowship
- 1975: Georges’ Prize (shared) Travel Grant, Visual Arts Board
