= Juan Davila (artist) =

Chilean/Australian artist and writer

- Born: 1946 (age 79–80); Santiago, Chile
- Known for: Painting
- Awards: Benalla nude art prize (2014)

Juan Davila (born 1946, in Santiago, Chile) is a Chilean-Australian artist and writer who migrated to Melbourne, Australia, in 1974. He is represented in major collections throughout Australia, as well as New York's Museum of Modern Art, the Tate (London) and the Museo Extremeño e Iberoamericano de Arte Contemporáneo in Spain. His works are often controversial, and in 2019 the Australian Christian Lobby called for one of his pictures to be removed from Griffith University Art Museum in Brisbane, which was part of an exhibition called The Abyss. The artwork Holy Family, depicts Mary cradling a giant penis, in the style of the famous Michelangelo sculpture The Pieta.

== Life ==
Davila was born in Chile and studied at Colegio del Verbo Divino in Santiago 1951–1963. He studied Law at the University of Chile (1965–1969) and subsequently attended the Fine Arts School of the University of Chile (1970–1972). His first solo exhibition in his native country was Latinamerican Artistic Coordination at CAL Gallery, Santiago in 1974. In that year he moved to Melbourne.

== Work ==
Davila is primarily a painter but he has also exhibited drawings and installation art. He is prolific and has exhibited throughout Australia, South and North America and Europe. He was included in the 1982 and 1984 Biennales of Sydney, the 1998 São Paulo Biennial and the 2007 Documenta 12 in Germany.

His work was given a survey exhibition at Canberra's Drill Hall Gallery in 2002, and major retrospective exhibitions at the Museum of Contemporary Art Australia in Sydney in 2006 and the National Gallery of Victoria in 2007.

His work has been called "a collage of quotations" and references other artists, psychoanalysis and pornography.

His work Stupid as a Painter was seized by police on the basis of alleged obscenity at the Fourth Biennale of Sydney in 1982.

His 1994 painting The Liberator Simón Bolívar led to a formal protest by Venezuela, Colombia and Ecuador to the Chilean government.

He has also addressed themes of Australian politics and history, including unflattering portrayals of politicians like Bob Hawke and Paul Keating, and a sexualised, scatological reworking of the Burke and Wills story. In 2002 he had an exhibition called Woomera themed around the desert immigration detention centre. Critic Robert Nelson said that this exhibition demonstrated Davila's "resonant social voice" speaking out against an Australia in which "the unethical is normalized".

In the catalogue essay for that exhibition Davila wrote: "Even most of our intellectuals today seem unable to formulate an idea of the nation we want, so facilitating the current culture of indifference to the reductionism under which we live. We seem to have lost the capacity to relate to any other culture or being but the Western one….Social issues, disturbance, difference, misery, madness and strangeness are silenced by emphasizing in the other only that which resembles us, or by distancing the other and its desire as alien, thus erasing the capacity of anyone to address or challenge us…”

He is often linked with his friend and fellow Melbourne artist Howard Arkley, with whom he collaborated for an exhibition called Blue Chip Instant Decorator in 1991, at Tolarno Galleries in South Yarra. Their second collaboration, Icon Interior, was incomplete at the time of Arkley's death and finally exhibited at Kalli Rolfe Contemporary Art in 2001. His later work tends to be less confrontational, as exemplified by his 2011 show The Moral Meaning of Wilderness at MUMA, though he courted controversy again in 2019 with his work Holy Family, depicting the Virgin Mary cradling a giant penis.

Davila was the inaugural winner of the non-acquisitive $50,000 Benalla Nude Art Prize for 2014.
