= David Chesworth =

Australian composer

- Born: 1958 (age 67–68); Stoke-on-Trent, England
- Origin: Melbourne, Australia
- Genres: Experimental, Minimalism, Post-punk, Electronic, Contemporary classical
- Occupations: Composer, Sound artist, Interdisciplinary artist
- Years active: 1970s–present
- Labels: Innocent Records, ABC Classics, Chapter Music
- Website: www.leberandchesworth.com

David Chesworth (born 1958) is an English-born Australian interdisciplinary artist, composer and sound designer. Known for his conceptual, and at times, minimalist music, he has worked solo, in post-punk groups (Essendon Airport, Whadya Want?), electronic music, contemporary ensembles and experimental performance. He has also created installation and video artworks with collaborator Sonia Leber, such as Zaum Tractor included in the 56th Venice Biennale (2015) and This Is Before We Disappear From View commissioned by Sydney Biennale (2014).

== Works ==
The Master's Voice by Sonia Leber and David Chesworth, City Walk, Canberra

Chesworth's creative output includes music, sound art, video, installation and performance, often in collaboration with other artists. His compositions and installations have been exhibited and performed at Ars Electronica, Festival d'automne à Paris, Edinburgh Festival, BAM's Next Wave Festival, Bang on a Can Marathon, Sydney Biennale and the Venice Biennale. In 2012 he was artist in residence at the MONA Festival of Art and Music in Hobart which featured performances by the David Chesworth Ensemble and artworks made with collaborator Sonia Leber.

Chesworth's artworks and music often explore their own framing and contextual ambiguity. The New Grove Dictionary of Music and Musicians writes:

Chesworth’s work focuses on the social in human experience, emphasizing shared cultural spaces – how music and sounds of diverse nature interact with cultural memory and performative contexts. The direct appeal of his musical surfaces, his collaborative working methods, and the implicit critique of traditional boundaries between genres, academic and popular subcultures, and art forms in his music and art can provoke audiences who adhere to musical styles and genres.

Early in his career Chesworth coordinated the Clifton Hill Community Music Centre in Melbourne, a centre for experimental music, performance, film and video. He performed extensively in the late 1970s and early '80s as a solo performer and with post-punk group Essendon Airport. Through Innocent Records, a label he co-founded with Philip Brophy, he released solo records that playfully deconstruct cultural tropes, including 50 Synthesizer Greats! and Layer on Layer, and with the group Essendon Airport – Sonic Investigations of the Trivial and Palimpsest, and Whadya Want? – Skippy Knows. These have been reissued on CD and vinyl.

=== Installations ===
Together with collaborator Sonia Leber, Chesworth has created a series of public art and gallery installations that 'exist significantly in the world of the imaginary'. Including 5000 Calls, a permanent 'sonic environment' for the surrounds of the Sydney Olympic Stadium for the 2000 Olympics. Other Leber and Chesworth projects include We, The Masters, a sound installation for Melbourne City Square, commissioned by Australian Centre for Contemporary Art (ACCA), We Are Printers Too, a 'speculative and archaeological' video set in the former Age Newspaper building in Melbourne. They have created public domain installations in Ljubljana, Cardiff, and New Zealand. Leber and Chesworth were the 2007 recipients of the Australian Centre for Contemporary Art's Helen Macpherson Smith Commission, for which they created the major installation work Almost Always Everywhere Apparent. Their recent major mid-career survey exhibition, Architecture Makes Us was exhibited at Centre for Contemporary Photography in Melbourne and has toured to several states including UNSW Galleries in Sydney.

Chesworth and Leber collaborated with Simeon Nelson on Proximities, a 2006 Commonwealth Games public sound-art commission for William Barak Bridge in Melbourne and Oceanic Endless for Melbourne's Cardinia Council in 2007.

=== Experimental Performance ===
Chesworth's interest in exploring wider extra-musical contexts has led to his involvement with performance artworks and experimental opera. Insatiable, was completed in 1986. Since then he has worked with Melbourne's Chamber Made Opera (Recital, The Two Executioners and Lacuna), and with the Melbourne International Arts Festival (Cosmonaut, commissioned by Opera Australia, and Sabat Jesus). In 2010 Chesworth created the performance artwork Richter/Meinhof-Opera which was presented at Australian Centre for Contemporary Art for the 2010 Melbourne International Arts Festival and at the Art Gallery of NSW. The CD Wicked Voice containing material from various productions was released on ABC Classics.

=== David Chesworth Ensemble ===
Chesworth is the artistic director of David Chesworth Ensemble. The ensemble has released four CDs, Exotica Suite (nominated for the ARIA Classical Release of the Year), Badlands (also released in the USA), Music To See Through, and Vanishing Tekopia. "Panopticon" from Music To See Through was awarded Instrumental Work of the Year at the APRA Classical Music Awards. The ensemble has given numerous performances including the Melbourne Festival, performances with Nick Cave and the Bad Seeds at the Forum in Melbourne. International appearances include BAM's Next Wave Festival, the Bang on a Can Marathon in New York, the Kennedy Center in Washington, and performances in Slovenia, France and the UK, where they appeared at the Big Chill Festival.

== Biography ==
He was born in Stoke-on-Trent, England. Chesworth's parents moved the family from Britain to Melbourne, Australia in the late 1960s. Chesworth studied at La Trobe University, including time with composers Jeff Pressing, Warren Burt and Graham Hair. He was awarded a doctorate in philosophy at Monash University, for which he was awarded the Mollie Holeman Medal for research excellence. He was recently a Vice-Chancellor's Research Fellow at RMIT University. He lives in Melbourne in partnership with Sonia Leber. They are directors of the company Wax Sound Media and have one daughter.

== Discography ==
David Chesworth

- 50 50 Synthesizer Greats! (1979)
- Layer on Layer (1981)
- Industry & Leisure EP (1982)
- Spiral Rebound (1982)
- Drive Time with Bill McDonald (1984)
- Stories of Imitation and Corruption (1984)
- Chris Mann and David Chesworth single (1985)
- No Particular Place (1986)
- Tantrum (1988)
- Silicon Valley Soundscapes (1990)
- Risky Business (1991)
- Remnants (1996)
- Environment Videowall Soundscape (1998)
- Wicked Voice (2001)
- Disk of Idioms (2004)
- The Unattended Serge 1978 / Five Evolutionary Things 1979 (2014)
- Shark Bay (2016)
- Here Comes Everything (2018)
- 90s Minimal Wave & Ambience (2018)
- Nice Assorted Biscuits (2018)
- Serge Bowl Performance (2021)
- Where I Am (2023)
- Sun Rocks and Metals (2024)
- Fun Machine Dirges (2025)

The Dave & Phil Duo

- Present Themselves 7" with Philip Brophy (1980)

Essendon Airport

- Sonic Investigations of the Trivial EP (1980)
- Talking To Cleopatra 7" with Anne Cessna (1980)
- Palimpsest (1982)
- Agua Por Favor b/w Ten Thousand Steps 7" with Anne Cessna (2022)
- MOR (2025)

Whadya Want?

- Life on TV 7" (1985)
- Skippy Knows (1985)

The David Chesworth Ensemble

- Exotica Suite (1992)
- Badlands (1998)
- Music To See Through (2005)
- Vanishing Tekopia (2011)
- Sport (2020)

== Experimental operatic works ==
- Insatiable (1986): music & texts by Chesworth
- Recital (1988): music by Chesworth, Puccini, Mozart et al., text by Douglas Horton and Helen Noonan, produced by Chamber Made Opera
- Lacuna (1992): music by Chesworth, text by Douglas Horton, produced by Chamber Made Opera
- The Two Executioners (1994): music by Chesworth, text by Douglas Horton, produced by Chamber Made Opera
- The Light Room (2001): opera devised with Company in Space
- Cosmonaut (2004): music by Chesworth, text by Tony MacGregor
- Richter/Meinhof-Opera (2010): music and text by Chesworth, after a libretto by Tony MacGregor.

== Installation artworks ==
Collaborations with Sonia Leber include

- 5000 Calls (2000 – ongoing) Sydney Olympic Stadium
- The Masters Voice (2001 – 2011) The Walk Civic, Canberra
- The Persuaders (2003) Australian Centre for the Moving Image, Melbourne
- Proximities (2006 – ongoing) at the William Barak Bridge, Melbourne
- Almost Always Everywhere Apparent (2007) Helen Macpherson Smith Commission Australian Centre for Contemporary Art, Melbourne
- Space-Shifter (2009) Conical, Melbourne
- We Are Printer's Too (2012) Melbourne Now, National Gallery of Victoria, Melbourne
- This Is Before We Disappear From View (2014) Biennale of Sydney
- Zaum Tractor (2013) 56th Venice Biennale

== Awards and nominations ==
- Prix Ars Electronica. Honorable Mention awarded to Southgate, Chesworth's score for the opening ceremony of Southgate, Melbourne, 1991.
- Churchill Fellowship. In 1997 Chesworth was awarded a travel fellowship to the US, France and UK to investigate new audio technologies.
- ATOM Awards (Australian Teachers of Media). Chesworth's TV opera Insatiable won most innovative film.
- ARIA Awards (Aust. Record Industry Assoc.). The David Chesworth Ensemble CD Exotica Suite was nominated for the 1994 Best Classical CD ARIA Award.
- Green Room Awards. Chesworth's music and sound design for the play Life After George received a 2000 Green Room award.
- The Age Performing Arts Award. Awarded to Chesworth/Horton opera The Two Executioners
- The Myer Group Arts Award. Awarded to the Chesworth/Horton opera Lacuna
- Substation Contemporary Art Prize, winner 2016 One from Mosta Two From Zabbar
- Gold Coast Art Prize, winner 2014 We Are Printers Too
- Melbourne Prize for Urban Sculpture, finalist 2011 We, The Masters

=== APRA Classical Music Awards ===
The APRA Classical Music Awards are presented annually by Australasian Performing Right Association (APRA) and Australian Music Centre (AMC).

Year	Nominee / work	Award	Result
2006	"Floating World" (David Chesworth) – David Chesworth Ensemble	Instrumental Work of the Year	Nominated
2006	"Panopticon" (David Chesworth) – David Chesworth Ensemble	Instrumental Work of the Year	Won
2006	"Wait a While" (David Chesworth) – David Chesworth Ensemble	Instrumental Work of the Year	Nominated
