= Fast Forward (cassette magazine) =

Australian post-punk cassette magazine

Fast Forward was a cassette magazine documenting post-punk music in the early 1980s. It was edited in Melbourne, Australia, by Bruce Milne and Andrew Maine, with graphic design by Michael Trudgeon. The cassettes interspersed interviews with music and were packaged with printed artwork and distributed in record shops around Australia and abroad. Thirteen issues were produced between November 1980 and October 1982.

== Background ==
Maine and Milne were presenters on independent Melbourne station 3RRR and had access to material via radio and Milne's connections with independent record stores Au Go Go and Missing Link Records. They had planned a magazine with a flexidisc, but found they were able to obtain large quantities of unsold pre-recorded cassettes from manufacturers. They bulk-erased these and repackaged them with new content and labels. Editing, erasing, and dubbing was done using equipment at the 3RRR studio.

The temporary or makeshift nature of cassettes was part of the appeal. Milne told Rolling Stone's Andrea Jones in 1981 that "I don't see the music we put down on those tapes as being a permanent document like a record. We hope that people will hear the tape and then go out and see the bands".

In a 2011 interview in Mess+Noise magazine, Milne said: "I was so fanatical about music. I was running gigs and pretending to be managing bands, starting a record label and working at Missing Link, and doing radio shows. When the whole punk thing happened I was right there at ground zero. There was a sense that finally our kind of music had come along. I knew it was incredibly important at the time, so I was trying to document it in any way that I could. By the time I started Fast Forward, in late 1980, I had already been writing for the major music magazines, but also doing fanzines for a number of years. As anyone who writes about music knows, you get to a stage where you go, 'This is a great record, but there are a limited number of adjectives I can use to describe it.' This frustrated me, but I wanted people to know about this music."

== Cassette magazines ==
A number of cassette magazines appeared in the early 1980s, such as the British pop magazine Mix, and Seattle's Sub Pop which alternated cassette and print editions and which later became a record label. It is likely that Fast Forward was one of the first cassette magazines, and that it inspired Sub Pop.

== Contents ==
Fast Forward was effectively a purchasable radio show (not a "compilation album" as some have termed it, as interviews and other spoken-word material were integral to the content) in packaging which began with a simple one-piece "cover" in a plastic bag to a silk-screened wallet with various leaflets and booklets in its various pockets. Trudgeon explained that normally a "cassette is usually a small, miserably packaged object that has no intrinsic qualities".

Highlights include live music from the Laughing Clowns, the Go-Betweens' demos for "Send me a Lullabye", Rowland Howard's "Shivers" as performed by The Young Charlatans, Pel Mel's "No Word from China" recorded as a "demo", and interviews with The Fall and The Birthday Party. The most ambitious Fast Forward was probably the double-issue; it included two ninety-minute cassettes and extra print material.

As Jon Stratton has demonstrated, Fast Forward was not based on a notion of "Australian music to the world", unlike, for instance, Mark Dodgson's Big Back Yard show which was distributed to non-profit radio around the world in the late 80s. It was not exclusively local and would feature music from anywhere, the prime criteria being the editors' taste, and the proviso that it had not (yet) been released on vinyl.

== Final issues ==
At the time of the last few issues, Fast Forward was selling thousands of copies, making money, and attracting investors. However, Milne and Maine's tastes in music diverged, with Maine desiring to become more mainstream.

Milne quit, and Maine renamed Fast Forward to Crowd, a magazine-with-cassette with more of a fashion focus. This became print-only with its second issue, and ceased publication after the third.

== Collections ==
The National Film and Sound Archive holds a complete set of Fast Forward, which has been preserved and digitised.

The RMIT Design Archives also holds a complete set of Fast Forward.
