= No (band) =

Australian band

- Origin: Melbourne, Victoria, Australia
- Genres: Post punk
- Years active: 1986–1989
- Labels: Ultimate; Au-Go-Go
- Past members: See Members section

No were an Australian band, active during the late 1980s. They blended electronic music with nihilistic punk rock, in a similar fashion to New York's Suicide. The band was formed by Ollie Olsen (Whirlywirld, Orchestra of Skin and Bone), Marie Hoy (Sacred Cowboys, Orchestra of Skin and Bone) and Michael Sheridan (Great White Noise, Transwaste), later including John Murphy (Whirlywirld, Orchestra of Skin and Bone) and others. They released a self-titled 12" EP (1988) and two LPs; Glory for the Shit for Brains (1987), and Once We Were Scum, Now We Are God (1989).

== History ==
Following Olsen's work as musical director on Richard Lowenstein's 1986 feature film, Dogs in Space. The soundtrack included two re-recorded Whirlywirld songs, "Win/Lose", and "Rooms for the Memory". The soundtrack album peaking at No. 46 on the Australian album chart and "Rooms for the Memory", which featured Michael Hutchence (INXS), reached No. 11 on the Australian mainstream chart in February 1987.

Olsen then formed No in late 1986, performing on keyboards, vocals, drum machine and sampler, with Marie Hoy on keyboards, vocals, samples alongside Michael Sheridan on guitar. They were subsequently joined by Kevin McMahon on bass guitar. Both Hoy and Olsen had been members of post-punk group Orchestra of Skin and Bone, while Hoy acted in Dogs in Space and provided lead vocals on "Shivers" for its soundtrack. In August 1987, the band supported Big Black when they toured Australia. In November they released their first album, Glory for the Shit for Brains, on Ultimate Records. The songs were all written by Olsen, recorded at Jam Tin Studios in Cheltenham, Victoria, in late 1986/early 1987, and produced by Olsen and Gus Till (Beargarden and Models).

The album was followed in September 1988 by a self-titled EP, on Au-Go-Go Records, which featured a re-working of Jimi Hendrix's "Are You Experienced?". Sheridan later recalled working with Hoy and Olsen, "Surrounded by players of technology I decided to use the hold function on a BOSS DE 200 delay unit to achieve a way of sampling real-time phrases. I'd play these back through a second amplifier. This was a great way to play, having the best of 'hands on' the instrument and off while manipulating ones own sounds via a machine." The remaining songs on No were written by Olsen, recorded in late 1987 at Jam Tin Studios, and produced by the band and Till.

In 1989 the band released its second album, Once We Were Scum, Now We are God, on Au-Go-Go Records. The album was recorded live on 9 September 1988 at the Carlton, Victoria nightclub, Tiger Lounge, and then mixed and produced by the band, Till and Simon Polinski at the Powerplant Studios in Carlton. Byron Colley, in the July 1989 edition of Spin, described the "center of the band's sound is something like a huge Martin Rev automaton, bloated to intensity and gorged with diesel amphetamine. Heaped on top is scittery, scuzzed up, feedback-guitar and Ollie's aggresso-rant-voice-stug. On extended tunes, like "Glory For The Shit For Brains", this has the same intenso-scrunch wallop as Suicide's "Frankie Teardrop" but with only about as much deviation-in-spatial characteristics as a flaming car rolling end over end down a hill. Just beautiful." In a subsequent Spin article/interview with Michael Hutchence, Joel Levy states the album "collapses skittering despair and ranting fury into a swirling cacophony."

While still a member of No, Sheridan formed Dumb and the Ugly (1987–93) with John Murphy on drums and noise tapes (ex-the Wreckery) and David Brown on bass guitar. No disbanded in September 1989 with Olsen and Hutchence collaborating on a musical project, Max Q, co-producing a self-titled album combining electronic music with orchestra, bass, guitar and backing vocals. Max Q also included Sheridan and Murphy, with Hoy supplying backing vocals for the album.

== Discography ==
=== Albums ===
- Glory for the Shit for Brains - Ultimate Records (ULP001) (November 1987)
- Once We Were Scum, Now We Are God - Au-Go-Go Records (ANDA 94) (1989)
  - First pressing of LP included 7" "200 Years"

Both albums were later issued on CD.

=== EPs ===
- No 12" - Au Go Go Records (ANDA 88) (September 1988) - Cell/Are You Experienced?//Bigot/Death To The Users Of The World

== Members ==
- Marie Hoy - keyboards, vocals, samples
- Ollie Olsen - keyboards, vocals, sampler
- Michael Sheridan - guitar
- Kevin McMahon - bass guitar
