= Dumb and the Ugly =

Australian metal band

- Origin: Melbourne, Victoria, Australia
- Genre: Avant-garde metal
- Years active: 1987–1993
- Label: Dr Jim's
- Past members: David Brown; John Murphy; Michael Sheridan

Dumb and the Ugly were an Australian avant-garde metal band. They formed in 1987 with Michael Sheridan (also in No and then Max Q) on guitar; John Murphy (Whirlywirld, Orchestra of Skin and Bone, Max Q) on drums and synthesisers; and David Brown (Mulch, Ultratune) on bass guitar and guitar. Murphy and Sheridan had worked together in previous bands, generally working behind Ollie Olsen.

Dumb and the Ugly released a 12"EP (1990), a 7" single, "Blue Monk" / "Lazy 8" (1991), and a studio album on CD, Atmospheres of Metal (1992), all on the Dr Jim's label. The album includes guest musicians, Mia Stone, Jason Vassallo and Olsen. Olsen co-wrote "Knife Ladder" and "Atmosphere 145" with the band, while Stone co-wrote "One Fingered Man".

In a 2002 interview, Murphy recalled his time in Dumb and the Ugly, they were "a 3-piece outfit in which I played drums and some samples. This was formed with some very old friends from my teenage years who also played with other acts. This act was in the style of Sonic Youth meets Hendrix and Chrome/Helios Creed."
