= Beargarden (band) =

Australian musical group

- Origin: Melbourne, Victoria, Australia
- Genre: New wave
- Years active: 1982–1986
- Label: Virgin
- Past members: Sam Sejavka; Shane Andalou; Simon Polinski; Carl Manuell; Gus Till; Ross Farnell; Shaun Anderson
- Website: Facebook page

Beargarden was an Australian new wave band from Melbourne which, though well regarded critically, failed to achieve widespread success. It evolved directly from the post-punk group The Ears which disbanded in 1981 and reformed under the new name with Ross Farnell replacing Cathy McQuade on bass. The other members were Sam Sejavka (vocals) Mick Lewis (guitar), Carl Manuell (drums) and Gus Till (keyboards). Lewis was replaced later that year by Shane Andalou.

== Live performances ==
Not long after Beargarden began performing live, manager/publisher Chris Murphy developed an interest in the band, having seen them at the Crystal Ballroom, playing in support of INXS who he managed at the time. INXS members Michael Hutchence and Andrew Farriss also saw potential in Beargarden and expressed interest in producing a studio recording.

INXS invited the band to support them on an eleven show tour through Sydney and Chris Murphy signed them to his publishing company MMA. With a building industry vibe, the band also secured prominent support slots with Cold Chisel, Divinyls, Echo & The Bunnymen, The Teardrop Explodes and others. In February 1982, encouraged by Murphy, Beargarden signed a recording contract with RCA.

== Disbanded ==
Several months afterwards, riddled with internal strife, Beargarden disbanded. Sejavka occupied himself with a brief-lived band that did not see the outside of a rehearsal room, and wrote the play Planetarium, which was produced soon after. Keyboardist Gus Till joined the Models for a number of Australian tours.

== Reformed ==
Around the beginning of 1983, urged by Till and again encouraged by Chris Murphy, Beargarden reformed. Ex-Models tour-manager Chris Melios became manager and the band signed with booking agency Nucleus. The band's music moved further towards the pop standard of the day, abandoning the last chaotic influences of their precursors The Ears. With the RCA contract annulled, Virgin Records Australia chose Beargarden as their first Australian signing.

== Recordings ==
A single, "The Finer Things", was produced by Ross Cockle at AAV studios in South Melbourne and released in October 1984 with a film clip directed by John Hillcoat and featuring a young Noah Taylor.

Though the single made little impact on the charts, the band's fortunes continued to improve. Sebastian Chase, who had previously managed The Reels and Dragon, replaced Melios. Beargarden supported Orchestral Manoeuvres in the Dark on their Australian tour, as well as, in Melbourne, Culture Club, Simple Minds and Eurythmics.

In July 1985, Beargarden began recording their debut album, All That Fall, at Albert Studios in Sydney with producers Bruce Brown & Russel Dunlop. A second single "I Write the News" resulted from these sessions. The B-side, "Sixty Perfect Windows", had been recorded at Richmond Recorders, Melbourne, produced by Michael Hutchence and Andrew Farris (Hutchence also provides backing vocals for the track). A film clip for "I Write The News" was directed by Paul Goldman (director of Australian Rules, The Night They Called It a Day, The Ben Cousins Story). The single penetrated the lower reaches of the charts but despite heavy promotion and good airplay it was not a hit.

All That Fall took a great many months to complete and during this time the band's inner turmoil again boiled to the surface. Bassist Ross Farnell was replaced by Simon Polinski, and Shaun Andersen (brother of guitarist Shane Andalou) was recruited as second guitar. These changes exacerbated the band's pre-existing instability and, after the release of a third single 'Drink Drink Drink', it folded. Paul Goldman directed a clip for 'Drink Drink Drink' but, given the suggestive nature of the song title and the mistaking of burning scarecrows for burning crucifixes by the producers of Countdown, the video was not shown and the single made little impact.

== Disintegration ==
Beargarden's disintegration was accompanied by acrimony and incidents of poor and/or outrageous behaviour on stage. Virgin quickly divested themselves of the product and All That Fall was ultimately released to little fanfare on Chase Records, accompanied by a fourth and final single "A Seaside Song".

== Members ==
Sam Sejavka embarked on a successful writing career, inadvertently becoming infamous as the template for Michael Hutchence's character in the cult movie Dogs in Space. Gus Till joined Michael Hutchence's project Max Q before forming Third Eye with Ollie Olsen. He continues to record and produce music. Ross Farnell went on to play in Melbourne band, Crash Politics. Simon Polinski is now a sound engineer and music producer and has worked with major Australian artists such as The Church, Paul Kelly, Ollie Olsen and Stephen Cummings. His work with Yothu Yindi earned him an Aria Award.

== Album downloads ==
In 2010 two Beargarden albums, All That Fall and a collection of b-sides and demos entitled The Word That Refers to The Word That Refers to Walt Disney became available for download on Bandcamp.

== Discography ==
=== Albums/EPs ===
Year	Title	Label
1986	All That Fall	Virgin
2010	The Word That Refers to the Word That Refers to Walt Disney	Bandcamp

=== Singles ===
Year	Title	AU	Label
1984	"The Finer Things"	–	Virgin VOZ 001
1985	"I Write the News"	56	Virgin VOZ 004
1985	"Drink Drink Drink"	–	Virgin VOZ 007
1986	"A Seaside Song"	–	Chase
