= Max Q (album) =

Studio album by Max Q
- Released: September 1989
- Studio: Rhino Studios, Darlinghurst, New South Wales
- Genre: Synthpop; pop rock; electronic
- Length: 46:07
- Label: CBS
- Producer: Michael Hutchence, Ollie Olsen

Singles from Max Q
- 1. "Way of the World" Released: 28 August 1989; 2. "Sometimes" Released: 30 October 1989; 3. "Monday Night by Satellite" Released: March 1990

Max Q is the first and only studio album by Australian band Max Q. The album was released in September 1989. It was certified gold in Australia.

At the ARIA Music Awards of 1990, the album was nominated for ARIA Award for Breakthrough Artist – Album.

== Reception ==
Professional ratings
Review scores
Source	Rating
AllMusic	3/5 stars

Dan Jones said "Max Q deserves some long overdue attention. Constructed around Olsen's hybrid electronic song structures, Max Q explodes with invention at every turn. 'Sometimes' and 'Way of the World' bristle with a vibe of punk/agro meets disco/house splendor – an area bands like Depeche Mode and Massive Attack have explored in depth. Jittery guitars clash with looped percussion attacks, and Michael's raging vocal workouts head butt powerful orchestral flourishes and the odd sonic bleep. There's a lot of raw noise going on here, but some of it is certainly beautiful".

== Track listing ==
No.	Title	Writer(s)	Length
1.	"Sometimes"	Ollie Olsen	5:33
2.	"Way of the World"	Olsen	4:09
3.	"Ghost of the Year"	Olsen	4:19
4.	"Everything"	Michael Hutchence, Olsen	4:57
5.	"Concrete"	Hutchence, Olsen	5:15
6.	"Zero-2-0"	Hutchence, Olsen	1:32
7.	"Soul Engine"	Hutchence, Olsen	3:51
8.	"Buckethead"	Olsen	4:01
9.	"Monday Night by Satellite"	Olsen	3:35
10.	"Tight"	Hutchence, Olsen	3:37
11.	"Ot-Ven-Rot"	Hutchence, Olsen	5:15

Japanese bonus tracks
No.	Title	Writer(s)	Length
12.	"Sometimes" (Rock House Extended)	Olsen	5:45
13.	"Way of the World" (12" Mix)	Olsen	4:37
14.	"Zero-2-O" (Todd Terry Mix)	Hutchence, Olsen	4:20
15.	"Ghost of the Year" (Todd Terry Mix)	Olsen	4:23

== Personnel ==
Max Q members

- Michael Hutchence – vocals
- Ollie Olsen – producer
- Arne Hanna – guitar
- Michael Sheridan – guitar, feedback
- Bill McDonald – bass guitar
- Gus Till – piano, MIDI programming
- John Murphy – drums, percussion, trumpet, screams

Additional personnel

- Peggy Harley – backing vocals
- Marie Hoy – backing vocals ("Soul Engine")
- Pat Powell – backing vocals ("Bucket Head")
- Pam Ross – narration
- Paula Jones – engineer
- Design: Tony Redhead [Electric Paint]

== Charts ==
=== Weekly charts ===
Chart (1989–1990)	Peak position
Australian Albums (ARIA)	13
New Zealand Albums (RMNZ)	27
UK Albums (OCC)	69
US Billboard 200	182

=== Year-end charts ===
Chart (1989)	Peak position
Australian Albums (ARIA)	93

== Certification ==
Region	Certification	Certified units/sales
Australia (ARIA)	Gold	35,000^{^}
^{^} Shipments figures based on certification alone.

== Release history ==
Region	Date	Format(s)	Label	Catalogue
Australia	September 1989	CD; LP; Cassette	CBS	465906
Europe	September 1989	CD; LP; Cassette	Mercury Records	838 942
North America	September 1989	CD; LP; Cassette	Atlantic Records	82014
Japan	25 March 1990	CD; LP; Cassette	Alfa International ALCB-38	ALCB-38
