= Max q (disambiguation) =

Max q is the maximum value of dynamic pressure associated with a body travelling through the atmosphere, typically a spacecraft during launch.

Max q or Max Q may also refer to:

- Max Q (astronaut band), a musical group from Houston, Texas, made up of NASA astronauts
- Max Q (Australian band), a musical group from the 1980s, fronted by Michael Hutchence of INXS
  - Max Q (album), a 1989 studio album by Australian band Max Q
- Max Q (film), a 1998 television movie about a fictional Space Shuttle disaster
- Max Q (quartet), the 2007 Barbershop Harmony Society International quartet champion
- Max Quordlepleen, a character in The Hitchhiker's Guide to the Galaxy
- Nvidia Max-Q, variants of graphics processing units (GPUs) with a lower thermal design power (TDP)
- Maritime Launch Services, a Canadian space transport services company that trades on the NEO Exchange under the symbol MAXQ
- Maxim MAXQ, a line of microcontrollers with a design based on the transport triggered architecture

== See also ==
- Q-Max, a type of ship
