= John Gillies (artist and musician) =

Australian artist and musician

- Born: 1960; Beaudesert, Queensland, Australia
- Education: Sydney College of the Arts, University of Southern Queensland
- Years active: 1980–present
- Known for: Video art, Experimental Music
- Notable work: Techno/Dumb/Show, Divide

John Gillies is an Australian visual artist, filmmaker and musician, particularly known for his "multi-layered and complex" video works and installations. He has also curated a number of video art programs.

Gillies studied visual art and music at the University of Southern Queensland, including film and video with David Perry. Later he studied at Sydney College of the Arts.

He has produced many video art works since the 1980s including Hymn (1983), Techno/Dumb/Show (1991), Armada (1994–98), My Sister's Room (2000) and Divide (2006). and is particularly known for his collaborations with performers including The Sydney Front (Techno/Dumb/Show and Test), Clare Grant (The Mary Stuart Tapes) and Tess de Quincey (The de Quincey Tapes and Shiver Remix). Based partially on the writings of the early twentieth century Polish avant-garde writer and artist Witkacy and his argument in Australia with anthropologist Bronisław Malinowski, Gillies created the film and art installation, Witkacy & Malinowski: a cinematic séance in 23 scenes.

Gillies has recorded and performed as a solo musician (often with video projection), and was drummer and percussionist with experimental musician Jon Rose, keyboardist Jamie Fielding and Indigenous singer-songwriter Kev Carmody. The subsequent Carmody releases Street Beat and the album Bloodlines, which included the song From Little Things Big Things Grow, were nominated for ARIA awards in 1993 and 1994. He has had a long collaboration with guitarist Michael Sheridan, including playing in Sydney post-punk jazz band Great White Noise, Slaughterhouse (aka Slawterhaus) and with singer Radical Son.

== Collections ==
- Art Gallery of New South Wales, Sydney
- Fukuyama Museum of Art, Hiroshima
- Australian Centre for the Moving Image, Melbourne
- Museum of Contemporary Art Australia, Sydney
- Queensland Art Gallery, Brisbane
- National Gallery of Australia, Canberra
