= Naevus (band) =

British neofolk group

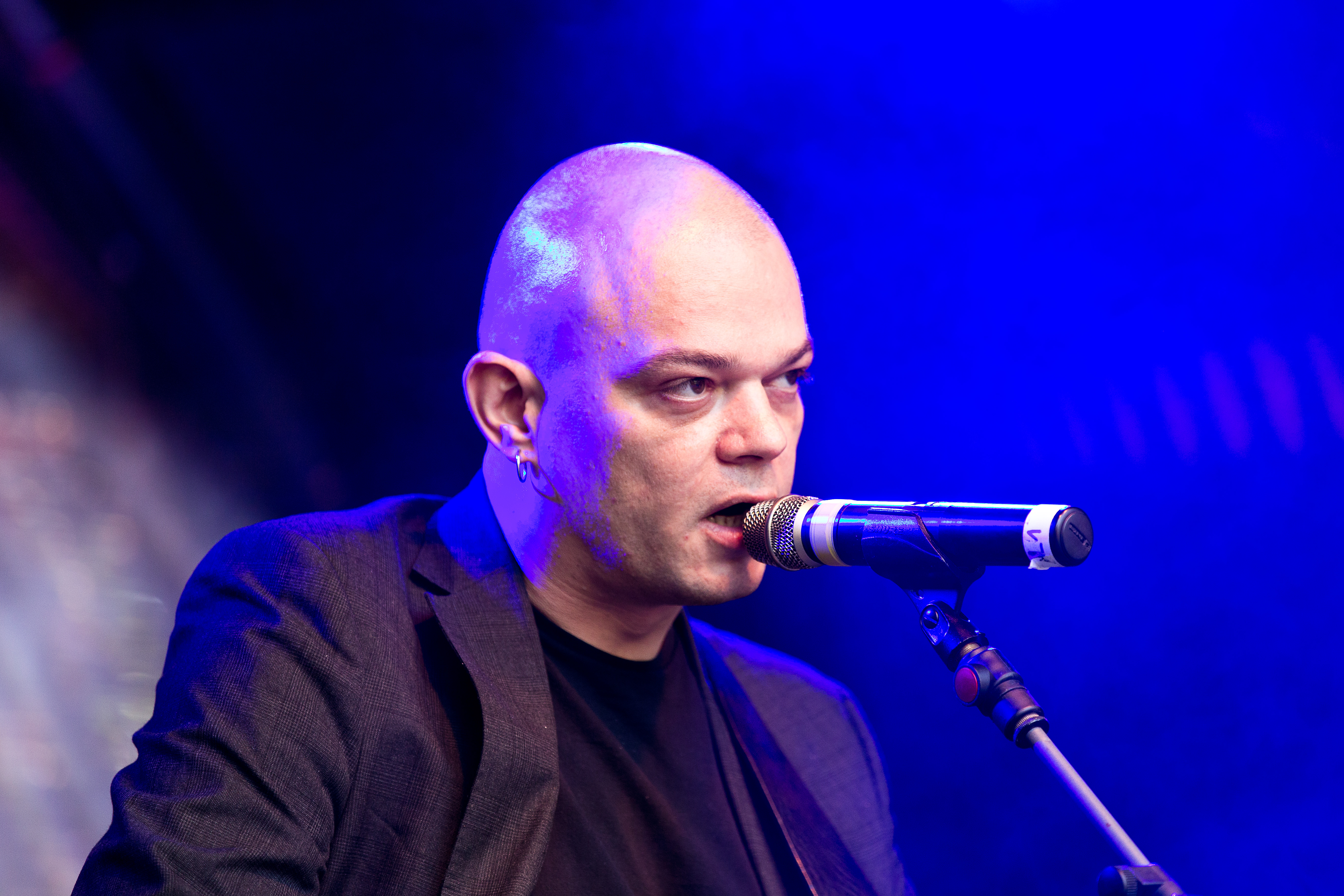
- Naevus at the Nocturnal Culture Night 10 festival, Germany 2015

Background information
- Origin: London, UK
- Genres: Neofolk, experimental rock, acoustic, post-punk
- Years active: 1998 – present
- Labels: Wooden Lung, S.P.K.R., Operative, Old Europa Cafe, Hau Ruck!, Terra Fria, Dagaz Music, Klanggalerie, Tourette, 4iB, Fluttering Dragon
- Members: Lloyd James; Ben McLees; Hunter Barr; Sam Astley
- Past members: John Murphy; Joanne Owen; Greg Ferrari; Arthur Shaw; Dan Knowler; Simone Skeleton; Aurora Lee; Clay Young

Naevus are a British experimental rock group. Formed in London in 1998 by Lloyd James (vocals, acoustic guitar) and Joanne Owen (bass, accordion), Naevus were often categorised as part of the 'neofolk' genre. Their music has also drawn comparison with acts such as Swans and Wire, and often includes elements of industrial music.

The band released four albums between 1999 and 2004 before expanding to a four-piece with the addition of John Murphy (drums) and Greg Ferrari (electric guitar). Their first album with the expanded line-up was Silent Life, which was a critical success, and included contributions from members of Urge Within, Sieben, and Current 93. Their sixth album, Relatively Close to the Sea, saw them combining elements of their earlier post-punk sounds alongside more melodic material and progressive rock elements. In 2009, Hunter Barr returned as drummer, having previously played on EP The Body Speaks in 2004, and the EP Days that Go followed in 2010. The seventh Naevus album, The Division of Labour, was completed by Lloyd James as a solo effort and was released in May 2012. In 2013, the compilation CDs Stations and Others were released, gathering together all singles, B-sides and compilation tracks from 2001 to 2012 as well as new and previously unreleased material. The EP Backsaddling was released in 2014, followed by the eighth, ninth and tenth Naevus studio albums, Curses, Time Again and Raise Your Puppet in 2018, 2020 and 2025 respectively.

== Discography ==
=== Studio albums ===
- Truffles of Love (1999), Wooden Lung
- Soil (2001), S.P.K.R.
- Behaviour (2002), Operative
- Perfection is a Process (2004), Operative/Old Europa Cafe
- Silent Life (2007), Hau Ruck!
- Relatively Close to the Sea (2008), Hau Ruck!
- The Division of Labour (2012), Hau Ruck!/Klanggalerie
- Curses (2018), Wooden Lung/Old Europa Cafe
- Time Again (2020), Hau Ruck!
- Raise Your Puppet (2025), Fluttering Dragon

=== EPs ===
- Sail Away (2003), Hau Ruck!
- The Body Speaks (2004), Hau Ruck!
- Go Grow (2008), Hau Ruck!
- Days that Go (2010), Hau Ruck!
- Backsaddling (2014), 4iB

=== Live album ===
- Appetite and Application (2014), Klanggalerie

=== Collaborative releases ===
- This is not Failure (1999, with Womb and Leisure Hive), not on label
- Document Three (2004, with KnifeLadder), Terra Fria
- Bedtime/Badtime (2005, with Spiritual Front), Old Europa Cafe
- Music Box 2008 (2008, with Rose McDowall and Sonver), Dagaz Music

=== Compilations ===
- Stations (2013), Tourette
- Others (2013), Tourette
- Water's Work (2018), Wooden Lung
