= Peril (band) =

Japanese-Australian industrial band

- Origin: Melbourne, Victoria, Australia
- Genres: Industrial; funk rock
- Years active: 1992–1996
- Labels: Dr Jim's; Sound Factory; Red Note
- Past members: Tony Buck; Kato Hideki; Michael Sheridan; Otomo Yoshihide; Thierry Fossemalle

Peril were a Japanese and Australian industrial band operating from 1992 to 1996. They released three albums, Peril (1993), Multiverse (1994) and Astro (1996).

== History ==
Peril were founded in Melbourne by Tony Buck on drums, samples and machine (also in the Necks) and they were active from 1992 to 1996. Their music was mostly improvised with Buck's drum-triggered samples providing a complex rhythmic base, over this is the turntablism and guitar of Otomo Yoshihide (also in Ground Zero (band)) and other rock improvised elements from Michael Sheridan on guitar (ex-No) and Kato Hideki (bass guitar, vocals) from Japan.

In 2006 Buck listed ten of his most influential albums, including The Mind Is a Terrible Thing to Taste (November 1989) by Ministry, which he described as "The sound, power, great mix of sampling and big guitars, space, simplicity, beats...I couldn't get enough of it for quite sometime. The influence of this band played a big part in some of the sounds I was going for in my band Peril I think."

Peril performed at the Sydney Sesquicentenary Jazz Festival in February 1992. The group recorded and performed internationally throughout Europe and Asia. Their debut, self-titled album was released via the local label, Dr Jim's Records, in 1993. It had been recorded partly in Melbourne and in Tokyo.

"The music was the most extreme collage of styles and textures that I've ever been gloriously immersed in. The depth to which sounds were crossed made Zorn's Naked City sound like a mere pit band."– Michael Sheridan

A second album, Multiverse, was recorded in the Netherlands between July and October 1993, and released in 1994 via Invisible / SF Records (Sound Factory) – the latter label is from Hong Kong. Buck and the group had relocated to the Netherlands where Hideki was replaced by Melbourne-born Thierry Fossemalle on bass guitar, for that album.

François Couture of AllMusic described how Multiverse "pushes the trio's art further into aural assault while retaining a wild funk-rock basis." In early 1994 Buck, Sheridan and Yoshihide were members of the Chaotic Violin, alongside Chris Abrahams (of the Necks) and Jon Rose, which performed at the Harbourside Brasserie in Sydney where Peril also appeared.

The group's third album, Astro, was released in 1996 via Red Note, with Buck producing. By that time they had relocated to Berlin where they disbanded during that year. Buck formed a group, Glacial, and also worked on experimental music. Sheridan issued his solo album, Digital Jamming, in 1996. Yoshihide continued with Ground Zero and his solo work. Fossemalle was later in Ute and from 1999 lives in Byron Bay.

== Discography ==
- Peril – Dr Jim's Records (1993)
- Multiverse – Invisible / SF Records (Sound Factory) (1994)
- Astro – Red Note (1996)
