= Primitive Calculators =

Australian post-punk band

- Origin: Melbourne, Victoria, Australia
- Genres: Post-punk; synth punk; noise rock; electronic
- Years active: 1978–1980; 2009–2018
- Label: Chapter
- Past members: Stuart Grant; David Light; Frank Lovece; Denise Rosenberg
- Website: primitivecalculators.com

Primitive Calculators were an Australian post-punk band, formed in 1978. Described by British critic Everett True as sounding like "a very aggressive Suicide", the band were known for their mix of harsh guitar noise, fast and repetitive drum machine beats, and abrasive synthesisers. Along with fellow Melbourne act Whirlywirld, the Primitive Calculators played a leading role in founding the experimental Little Band Scene of the late 1970s, wherein both bands and other acts formed numerous short-lived bands by frequently swapping members and inviting non-musicians to join in at live shows. They reformed periodically, with a live self-titled album released in 1982, which had been recorded at a 1979 performance. Primitive Calculators reunited again in 2009.

== History ==
=== First era ===
Primitive Calculators were formed in 1978 in Melbourne as an electronic music group by Stuart Grant on guitar and vocals, David Light on bass guitar and keyboards, Frank Lovece on drum machine and vocals and Denise Rosenberg on keyboards. The members had met as teenagers in Springvale, a working-class outer suburb of Melbourne, in the early 1970s. The four moved together in 1977 to St Kilda, then the centre of the local punk rock scene, where they formed the Moths. Despite socialising with Nick Cave from the Boys Next Door they remained outsiders of that scene.

In 1978 the Moths moved to Fitzroy and renamed themselves as Primitive Calculations for recording. They found like-minded friends, Ollie Olsen and John Murphy of Whirlywirld. They drew influence from proto-punk acts like the Godz, the Velvet Underground, Texan 1960s psychedelic punk, James Brown, the Silver Apples and Australian band Billy Thorpe and the Aztecs.

The band were instrumental in organising a series of gigs named "Little Band nights", where hastily formed bands would play for 15 minutes each; this led to recording a compilation extended play (EP). They became known for their use of a screeching Mosrite Ventures model guitar, primitive synthesisers (a Wasp and Roland SH2), an electronic organ played via effects pedals and an extra fast drum machine (Roland CR-78). Their live show in 1979 at The Hearts hotel, Carlton was recorded; they had been supporting the Boys Next Door. Late that year they issued an independent single, "Do that Dance".

The Primitive Calculators played their last gig in March 1980, though their self-titled live album came out in 1982. It was from the 1979 show at The Hearts hotel. The band reformed briefly in 1986 to perform a version of their song "Pumping Ugly Muscle" in the Richard Lowenstein film Dogs in Space (they later appeared in Lowenstein's 2009 documentary We're Livin' on Dog Food). According to music journalist, Clinton Walker, "[they] delivered a raw, savage, kinetic sound that could only be compared with" the New York no wave scene.

=== Second era ===
In 2001, a 1979 live recording of "Pumping Ugly Muscle" was included in Can't Stop It, a compilation of Australian post-punk bands from 1978 to 1982, released by Chapter Music. Its title is taken from the Primitive Calculators' studio recording in December 1979, which was the B-side of their "Do That Dance" single. The recording led to renewed interest in the band and the 2003 release of an EP, Glitter Kids, which used three live recordings from 1979, via Meeuw Muzik in the Netherlands.

The Primitive Calculators' album was reissued on CD by Chapter Music in 2004, with the inclusion of extra tracks from related projects (their first band the Moths from 1978 and other live recordings from 1979). In March 2007, Chapter Music released Primitive Calculators and Friends, 1979 to 1982, a CD that contained the only studio recordings of the band (the 7-inch single from 1979), the "Little Band" single, also from 1979, and live tracks from Little Band nights. It also contained other recordings from bands the members formed after 1980, including "Zye Ye Ye" (recorded in London in 1981 with Olsen and Murphy), and bands formed after the return of band members to Australia from Europe, in 1982.

In January 2009, the band reformed for the inaugural Australian All Tomorrow's Parties music festival, curated by Nick Cave and the Bad Seeds and held at Mount Buller in Victoria. The band subsequently recorded a new album, The World Is Fucked, released in 2013. Grant explained the album title in a December 2013 interview:

The album is called The World is F---ed because that's what we believe. The world's not any better now – in fact, it's worse. I can remember when the hippopotamus and rhinoceros weren't endangered species. I can remember when there was opposition, and when Chicago School economics wasn't a naturalised reality of life. And the anger in our music is because it doesn't need to be like that – and we don't need to be this nasty society.

Grant described in 2013 that he enjoys reading, drinking coffee and tea, and "being of use in other people's lives". He revealed that his band intended to record another album: "I want to make a psychedelic-space-folk record about taking hallucinogenic drugs." Midway through its recording the band were invited by Genjing Records and Split Works to play Jue Festival 2015 in Beijing and Shanghai. Frank Lovece left the group before the tour. They toured China also playing Xi’an, Yiwu and Wuhan and released a tour edition split 7-inch with activist noise artist Torturing Nurse. Denise Rosenberg (as Denise Hilton) left the band after that tour.

In 2016, it Records released "On Drugs", a single from Primitive Calculators' proposed album of the same name. It is a boogie-rock, soul inspired track, focused on the central character. Grant signalled a change in the band's direction. In August 2017 David Light left the group. On 10 January 2018 Frank Lovece died. On Drugs was released on 13 April 2018 with Grant the only original member of Primitive Calculaters left. They played a few times but disbanded later that year.

== Citations ==
- Spencer, Chris (1989). Who's who of Australian rock. Fitzroy, Vic.: Five Mile Press.
- Walker, Clinton (1996). Stranded: The Secret History of Australian Independent Music 1977–1991. Sydney: Pan Macmillan.
