= Sam Sejavka =

Australian writer, actor and musician (born 1960)

- Born: Samuel Marcus Sejavka; 2 April 1960 (age 66); Melbourne, Victoria, Australia
- Genres: Art punk; glam pop
- Occupations: Musician; actor; writer
- Instrument: Vocals
- Years active: 1979–present
- Website: Archive of now defunct official webpage

Samuel Marcus Sejavka (born 2 April 1960) is an Australian writer, actor and musician. He was lead vocalist for post punk bands The Ears (1979–81) and Beargarden (1982–86). He and the Ears were the inspiration for the 1986 film, Dogs in Space. The main character, Sam, was played by INXS vocalist Michael Hutchence.

== Early life ==
Sejavka was born in 1960 in Melbourne. His father, Vilis Sejavka (1923–1980), was a labourer from Lasupag, Latvia, and a former conscript for the Latvian Legion during World War 2. Vilis migrated to Australia in September 1948 via SS Wooster Victory. He settled in Melbourne and became an Australian citizen in July 1954. Sejavka grew up in Mount Waverley, where he attended Holy Family Primary, a Catholic school. He attended secondary school at St Kevin’s College in Toorak.

Sejavka spent most of his early working life singing and composing music. From 1979 to 1981 he was the lead vocalist of an art punk band, the Ears, which issued the singles, "Leap for Lunch" (early 1980) and "Scarecrow" (early 1981). Fellow band mates were Mick Lewis on guitar, Cathy McQuade on bass guitar, Charles "Chuck" Meo on drums and Tim McLaughlin on keyboards. Australian musicologist, Ian McFarlane, described their singles, which "echoed the sounds of David Bowie and Brian Ferry crossed with Magazine and The Boys Next Door." He observed, "[they] became one of the most popular bands on the Melbourne inner-city/Crystal Ballroom scene."

After the Ears disbanded in late 1981 Sejavka became the lead vocalist for glam poppers, Beargarden (1982–86). Fellow founders were Ross Farnell on bass guitar (ex-Daily Planet), Carl Manuel on drums and Gus Till on keyboards (both former latter day members of the Ears). They were signed to Chase Records and had a minor hit with their single, "The Finer Things" (September 1984), and an album All That Fall (November 1986). McFarlane noticed, "[they] adopted a sophisticated, quasi-decadent look and style that drew from English antecedents like Roxy Music, Japan and Psychedelic Furs."

The fictionalised bio-pic and musical film, Dogs in Space (December 1986), written and directed by his friend and former flat mate, Richard Lowenstein, drew inspiration from various episodes of Sejavka's life during the late 1970s. Its title is from a track of the same name by the Ears, which was co-written by Sejavka and Lewis. The main male character, Sam, was portrayed by INXS vocalist, Michael Hutchence as the lead vocalist of a band, Dogs in Space; Meo took the role of "Chuck" their drummer; while Sejavka appears briefly in a party scene, addressed by Hutchence as "Michael".

== Writing and acting ==
Since the 1990s, Sejavka concentrated on his work as an actor, writer and playwright. In 1995 his play, All Flesh is Glass, took him to New York as part of an exchange programme organised by New Dramatists and the Australian National Playwright's Centre.

Sejavka appeared in stage productions including: The Death of Peter Pan, Quintessence and Shipwreck!, all directed by Robert Chuter and produced at La Mama Theatre, Carlton. Sejavka also wrote the acclaimed plays The Hive and the award-winning In Angel Gear. In the 2010s he documented local life in Mt Waverley via his blog.

Sejavka has published many short prose works. His screenplay for the hour-length film, Earthbound, was the first film script to be short-listed for the Louis Esson Drama prize. Sometimes he works as a theatre director.

His play, Mysterium, commissioned by Kickhouse theatre, won the 1999 Wal Cherry Award. In mid-2000 he played Oscar Wilde in Barry Dickins' play, Believe me Oscar Wilde at La Mama. His other productions include The Lord of Misrule and Sruti Smriti.

He adapted Jacob Rosenberg's long-form poem, Shylock, for the stage. This work centred around an adaptation of Shakespeare's The Merchant of Venice set in a Jewish ghetto in Nazi-occupied Poland. He later worked on Ambergris – set on an island off the coast of Queensland, dealing with beauty and greed, and As Above So Below – a play about the occult practices of the poet, W. B. Yeats. He is a parent and collected 19th-century horror and fantasy novels.

== Bibliography ==
- Planetarium
- Restoring the Picture of Dorian Gray directed by Australian theatre/film director Robert Chuter
- Advice from a Caterpillar
- In the Service of Beauty
- Sejavka, Sam (1997), "The Hive", in Jones, Liz (ed.), The La Mama Collection: Six Plays for the 1990s, Currency Press, ISBN 978-0-86819-532-2, "Contents: 1. "The Hive"/Sam Sejavka" Note: "The Hive" is winner of the Victorian Premier's Louis Esson Prize for Drama in 1990, directed by Robert Chuter then adapted in 2006 by Chamber Made into a music-theatre work
- In Angel Gear (winner of the Victorian Green Room Awards Best Production), directed by Robert Chuter
- Mammothrept (produced while he was playwright-in-residence at La Mama Theatre, Melbourne).
- Sejavka, Sam (2005), "Seed Habit", in Oakley, Barry (ed.), On the Edge: 30 Modern Australian Short Stories, Five Mile Press, ISBN 978-1-74124-853-1, "26: "Seed Habit" / Sam Sejavka"
