= Sometimes (Max Q song) =

Single by Max Q

from the album Max Q
- Released: 30 October 1989
- Genre: Synth-pop, electronic
- Length: 3:42
- Label: CBS
- Songwriter: Ollie Olsen
- Producers: Michael Hutchence; Ollie Olsen

Max Q singles chronology
"Way of the World" (1989)	"Sometimes" (1989)	"Monday Night by Satellite" (1990)

"Sometimes" is a song recorded by Australian band Max Q. It was released in October 1989 as the band's second single from their debut self-titled album (1989).

The song was first released on the 1985 self-titled album by the song's writer Ollie Olsen's previous band Orchestra of Skin and Bone and rerecorded for the Max Q album.

The Sacred Cowboys also covered "Sometimes" on their 1988 album Trouble From Providence.

== Track listing ==
- 7"
1. "Sometimes" (Straight Rock mix) – 3:42
2. "Love Man" – 4:18
- 12"/CD Maxi
1. "Sometimes" (Straight Rock mix) – 3:42
2. "Sometimes" (Rock House extended mix) – 5:45
3. "Love Man" – 4:18
4. "Sometimes" (Dub mix) – 4:00

== Charts ==
Chart (1989/1990)	Peak position
Australia (ARIA)	31
New Zealand (Recorded Music NZ)	37
UK Singles (OCC)	52

== Release history ==
Country	Date	Format	Label
Australia	30 October 1989	7", 12", cassette single, CD single	CBS
United Kingdom	5 February 1990	7", 12", cassette single, CD single	Mercury Records
