= Sandy Evans =

Australian jazz composer, saxophonist, and teacher

Sandy Evans OAM
- Origin: Australia
- Genre: Jazz
- Occupations: Composer; instrumentalist; teacher
- Instruments: Tenor saxophone; soprano saxophone; flute
- Years active: 1982–present
- Website: sandyevans.com.au

Sandy Evans is an Australian jazz composer, saxophonist, and teacher. Recognition of her work has included receiving an Order of Australia Medal in 2010 for services to music.

== Career ==
In the early 1980s Evans played in Great White Noise with Michael Sheridan and formed the group Women and Children First, which included Jamie Fielding, Steve Elphick, Indra Lesmana and Tony Buck.

Evans composed the music for the 1999 radio drama Testimony: The Legend of Charlie Parker, which showcased the poetry of Yusef Komunyakaa, and was broadcast on ABC's Soundstage FM.

In 2008 she delivered the 10th Annual Peggy Glanville-Hicks Address. At the APRA Music Awards of 2013, her composition Meetings at the Table of Time performed by members of the Australian Art Orchestra and the Sruthi Laya Ensemble won Performance of the Year and was nominated for Work of the Year – Jazz.

In 2014 she was awarded a PhD from Macquarie University, Australia, for practice-based research in Carnatic Jazz Intercultural music. She also received a Churchill Fellowship to visit India in 2014 and began to collaborate with Aneesh Pradhan and Shubha Mudgal. She is currently a lecturer in Jazz at the University of New South Wales.

She leads the Sandy Evans Trio (with Brett Hirst (double bass) and Toby Hall (drums) and Sextet, and co-leads the jazz and improvisational ensembles Clarion Fracture Zone and GEST8. As a performer, she is also a member of Mara!, The catholics, the Australian Art Orchestra, Ten Part Invention, and austraLYSIS, among other ensembles.

In 2023 Evans established the Evans Robson Quartet with both Sandy Evans and Andrew Robson on saxophone with Brett Hirst on bass and Hamish Stuart on drums. In 2025 they released an album called Zenith.

== Recordings ==
Sandy Evans has performed on more than 30 albums.

- Blue Shift (1990) with Clarion Fracture Zone.
- Zones On Parade (1993) with Clarion Fracture Zone.
- What This Love Can Do (1994) with Clarion Fracture Zone.
- Less Stable Elements (1996) with Clarion Fracture Zone.
- Unidentified Spaces (2000) with Ten Part Invention
- Not in the Mood (2002) Sandy Evans Trio.
- Canticle (2002) with Clarion Fracture Zone and featuring Paul Cutlan and Martenitsa Choir.
- The Edge of Pleasure (2009) Sandy Evans Trio.
- When the Sky Cries Rainbows (2011)
- Cosmic Waves (2012) Sandy Evans and Friends with Guru Kaaraikkudi Mani and Sruthi Laya.
- Yonder (2013) with The Catholics
- Kapture (2015) with Bobby Singh, Brett Hirst, Toby Hall and Saragan Sriranganathan.
- What She Sees (2018) Silke Eberhard and Sandy Evans, Rufus Records.
- Bridge of Dreams (2018) Sandy Evans in collaboration with Sirens Big Band, Shubha Mudgal, Aneesh Pradhan, Sudhir Nayak and Bobby Singh. Developed over several years and recorded across two continents from Mumbai to Sydney.
- Postcards from the Anthropocene (2020) Sandy Evans / Adam Hulbert / Hamish Stuart, Eupcaccia Records.
- The Running Tide (2024) Sandy Evans Trio (Sandy Evans, Brett Hirst and Toby Hall)
- Zenith (2025) Evans Robson Quartet. (Sandy Evans, Andrew Robson, Brett Hirst and Hamish Stuart)

== Awards ==
=== AIR Awards ===
The Australian Independent Record Awards (commonly known informally as AIR Awards) is an annual awards night to recognise, promote and celebrate the success of Australia's Independent Music sector.

Year	Nominee / work	Award	Result
2011	When the Sky Cries Rainbows	Best Independent Jazz Album	Won

=== Mo Awards ===
The Australian Entertainment Mo Awards (commonly known informally as the Mo Awards), were annual Australian entertainment industry awards. They recognise achievements in live entertainment in Australia from 1975 to 2016. Sandy Evans won two awards in that time.

Year	Nominee / work	Award	Result (wins only)
1992	Sandy Evans	Female Jazz Instrumental Performer of the Year	Won
1995	Sandy Evans	Jazz Instrumental Performer of the Year	Won
