= 1990 ARIA Music Awards =

Annual Australian music awards

- Date: 26 March 1990
- Venue: Darling Harbour Convention Centre, Sydney, New South Wales

Highlights
- Most wins: Ian Moss (5)
- Most nominations: Ian Moss (6)
- Website: ariaawards.com.au

The Fourth Australian Recording Industry Association Music Awards (generally known as the ARIA Music Awards or simply the ARIAs) was held on 26 March 1990 at the Darling Harbour Convention Centre in Sydney. Australian host Glenn Shorrock of Little River Band was assisted by Quincy Jones, and other presenters, to distribute 24 awards. For the first time there were live performances but the awards were not televised.

The ARIA Hall of Fame inducted two artists: Percy Grainger and Sherbet. An Outstanding Achievement Award was presented to Kylie Minogue.

== Presenters and performers ==
The ARIA Awards ceremony was hosted by singer-songwriter Glenn Shorrock. Presenters and performers were:

| Presenter(s) | Performer(s) | Ref. |
|---|---|---|
| Billy Birmingham | James Blundell – "Forty Miles to Saturday Night" | |
| Club Veg's Vic Davies, Mal Lees | James Blundell – "Forty Miles to Saturday Night" | |
| John Farnham | James Blundell – "Forty Miles to Saturday Night" | |
| Quincy Jones | Tommy Emmanuel, James Morrison, Sherine – "How High the Moon" | |
| Tania Lacey | Tommy Emmanuel, James Morrison, Sherine – "How High the Moon" | |
| Molly Meldrum | Tommy Emmanuel, James Morrison, Sherine – "How High the Moon" | |
| Daryl Somers | Peter Blakeley, Kate Ceberano, Ten Wedge – "The First Time Ever I Saw Your Face" | |
| James Valentine | Peter Blakeley, Kate Ceberano, Ten Wedge – "The First Time Ever I Saw Your Face" | |

== Awards ==
Final nominees for only some awards are available in reliable sources. Where not available, winners are listed.

=== ARIA Awards ===
- Album of the Year
  - Ian Moss – Matchbook
    - Kate Ceberano – Brave
    - Stephen Cummings – A New Kind of Blue
    - Hunters & Collectors – Ghost Nation
    - Paul Kelly & The Messengers – So Much Water So Close To Home
- Single of the Year
  - Peter Blakeley – "Crying in the Chapel"
    - Hunters & Collectors – "When The River Runs Dry"
    - Ian Moss – "Tucker's Daughter"
    - Max Q – "Way of the World"
    - The Black Sorrows – "Chained to the Wheel"
- Highest Selling Album
  - Diesel – Johnny Diesel & the Injectors
- Highest Selling Single
  - Kate Ceberano – "Bedroom Eyes"
- Best Group
  - The Black Sorrows – Hold On to Me
    - 1927 – "Compulsory Hero"
    - Boom Crash Opera – These Here Are Crazy Times
    - Johnny Diesel & The Injectors – Johnny Diesel & the Injectors
    - Hunters & Collectors – Ghost Nation
- Best Female Artist
  - Kate Ceberano – Brave
    - Robyne Dunn – Labour of Liberty
    - Gyan – Gyan
    - Kylie Minogue – Enjoy Yourself
    - Jenny Morris – Shiver
- Best Male Artist
  - Ian Moss – Matchbook
    - Peter Blakeley – "Crying in the Chapel"
    - Joe Camilleri – "Angel Dove"
    - Stephen Cummings – A New Kind of Blue
    - Paul Kelly – So Much Water So Close To Home
- Best New Talent
  - Gyan – Gyan
    - The Hummingbirds – loveBUZZ
    - Martha's Vineyard – Martha's Vineyard
    - Tall Tales and True – Shiver
    - Tania Bowra – Heaven and Earth
- Breakthrough Artist – Album
  - Ian Moss – Matchbook
    - Gyan – Gyan
    - Johnny Diesel & The Injectors – Johnny Diesel & The Injectors
    - The Hummingbirds – loveBUZZ
    - Max Q – Max Q
- Breakthrough Artist – Single
  - Ian Moss – "Tucker's Daughter"
    - Girl Overboard – "I Can't Believe"
    - Gyan – "Wait"
    - The Hummingbirds – "Blush"
    - Max Q – "Way of the World"
- Best Country Album
  - John Williamson – Warragul
    - Slim Dusty & Anne Kirkpatrick – Two Singers, One Song
    - Ted Egan – This Land Australia
    - The Flying Emus – Postcards From Paradise
    - The Happening Thang – The Happening Thang
- Best Independent Release
  - Wild Pumpkins at Midnight – This Machine Is Made of People
    - Dubrovniks – Dubrovnik Blues
    - Girl Monstar – "Surfing on a Wave" / "He's Hell"
    - Sirocco – Port of Call
    - Various Artists – Rockin' Bethlehem
- Best Indigenous Release
  - Weddings Parties Anything – The Big Don't Argue
    - Coloured Stone – Wild Desert Rose
    - Gondwanaland – Wildlife
    - Scrap Metal – Broken Down Man
    - Yothu Yindi – Homeland Movement
- Best Adult Contemporary Album
  - Stephen Cummings – A New Kind of Blue
    - Dragon – Bondi Road
    - Not Drowning, Waving – Claim
    - Paul Kelly & The Messengers – So Much Water So Close To Home
    - John Williamson – Warragul
- Best Comedy Release
  - The D-Generation – The Satanic Sketches
    - The Comedy Company – Comedy Company Classics
    - Fast Forward – Fast Forward – Take One
    - Kevin Bloody Wilson – My Australian Roots
    - Roy Slaven – Rampaging Roy... The Life and Times of Roy Slaven

=== Fine Arts Awards ===
- Best Jazz Album
  - Paul Grabowsky Trio – Six by Three
    - Allan Browne – Genre Jumping Jazz
    - James Morrison – Swiss Encounter – Live at the Montreux Jazz Festival
    - Various Artists – Jim McLeod's Jazz Tracks
    - Vince Jones – Trustworthy Little Sweethearts
- Best Classical Album
  - Tasmanian Symphony Chamber Players – Vivaldi: The Four Seasons
    - Australian Youth Orchestra – Works by Koehne, Stravinsky, Messiaen, Ravel
    - Geoffrey Collins & David Miller – Flute Australia Volume 2
    - Jane Rutter – Nocturnes & Preludes for Flutes
    - Various Artists – Landscapes
- Best Children's Album
  - Various Artists – Happy Birthday Series
    - Don Spencer – Australia For Kids
    - Noni Hazlehurst & Sydney Symphony Orchestra – Peter and the Wolf/Carnival of the Animals
    - Peter Combe – Chopsticks
    - The Cast of Pugwall – Pugwall – Original Music from the Television Series
- Best Original Soundtrack / Cast / Show Recording
  - Original Cast Recording – Anything Goes
    - Australian Cast Recording – 42nd Street
    - Various Artists – Sons of Steel
    - Various Artists – Spirits of the Air, Gremlins of the Clouds
    - Various Artists – The Navigator

=== Artisan Awards ===
- Song of the Year
  - "Tucker's Daughter" (Ian Moss) – Ian Moss, Don Walker
    - "Chained to the Wheel" (The Black Sorrows) – Joe Camilleri, Nick Smith
    - "Crying in the Chapel" (Peter Blakeley) – Peter Blakeley, Aaron Zigman
    - "When the River Runs Dry" (Hunters and Collectors) – Mark Seymour, John Archer, Doug Falconer, Jack Howard, Robert Miles, Barry Palmer, Jeremy Smith, Michael Waters
    - "Careless" (Paul Kelly & The Messengers) – Paul Kelly
- Producer of the Year
  - Andrew Farriss – Shiver – Jenny Morris
    - Charles Fisher – 1927/Gyan – "Compulsory Hero"/Gyan
    - Clive Martin, Hunters & Collectors – Ghost Nation – Hunters & Collectors
    - Mark Moffatt – "Make Me Smile (Come Up and See Me)"/"Clever Man", "Calm and Crystal Clear"/"Raindance"/"Stuck on You"/"Washaway"/"You Got a Mirror", "Who Do You Take It To" – Nick Barker & the Reptiles/Neil Murray/Steve Hoy/Paul Norton/The Shivers/Ross Wilson
    - Jeff Burstin, Joe Camilleri – "The Crack Up", "Chained to the Wheel" – The Black Sorrows
- Engineer of the Year
  - Alan Wright – "The Best Years of Our Lives", "I Am an Island"/"Touch the Fire"/"Save Me", "She Has to Be Loved"/"Simple Man" – Richard Clapton/Icehouse/Jenny Morris/Noiseworks
    - Mark Moffatt – "Burn"/"The World Seems Difficult"/"Different Drum"/"Calm and Crystal Clear", "Clever Man" – Bell Jar/Mental as Anything/Flying Emus/Neil Murray
    - Doug Roberts - "Onion Skin", "Get Out of the House!", "The Best Thing", "End Up Where I Started" – Boom Crash Opera
    - Paula Jones – Max Q – Max Q
    - Doug Brady – "Fire Down Below"/"Communication"/"I Can't Believe"/"Page One" – The Black Sorrows/John Farnham & Dani'Elle/Girl Overboard/David Hirschfelder
- Best Video
  - Geoff Barter – "Compulsory Hero" – 1927
    - "Onion Skin" – Boom Crash Opera
    - "When the River Runs Dry" – Hunters & Collectors
    - "Saved Me" – Jenny Morris
    - "Sometimes" – Max Q
    - "Spirits Song" – Meaningful Eye Contact
- Best Cover Art
  - Rob Miles – Hunters & Collectors – Ghost Nation
    - Greg O'Connor – These Here Are Crazy Times – Boom Crash Opera
    - Martin Fabinyi – Brave – Kate Ceberano
    - Deborah Parry Graphics / Ben Evans – Happy Birthday Series – Various Artists
    - Stephen Thomas – The Big Don't Argue – Weddings Parties Anything

== Outstanding Achievement Award ==
- Kylie Minogue

== ARIA Hall of Fame inductees ==
The Hall of Fame inductees were:

- Percy Grainger
- Sherbet
