= Way of the World (Max Q song) =

1989 single by Max Q

Single by Max Q

from the album Max Q
- B-side: "Zero 2 0"
- Released: 28 August 1989
- Length: 4:08
- Label: CBS
- Songwriter: Ollie Olsen
- Producers: Michael Hutchence; Ollie Olsen

Max Q singles chronology
"Way of the World" (1989)	"Sometimes" (1989)

"Way of the World" is a song by Australian band Max Q, released in August 1989 as the band's debut and lead single from their debut self-titled album (1989). The song reached number eight in Australia, number five in New Zealand, and number six on the US Billboard Modern Rock Tracks chart. At the ARIA Music Awards of 1990, the song was nominated for two awards: Single of the Year and Breakthrough Artist – Single.

== Track listings ==
- 7-inch
1. "Way of the World" – 4:08
2. "Zero 2 0" (Todd Terry mix) – 4:20
- 12-inch and CD
1. "Way of the World" (12-inch mix) – 4:37
2. "Way of the World" (7-inch mix) – 4:08
3. "Zero 2 0" (Todd Terry mix) – 4:20
4. "Ghost of the Year (Todd Terry mix) – 4:23

== Charts ==
=== Weekly charts ===
Chart (1989)	Peak position
Australia (ARIA)	8
New Zealand (Recorded Music NZ)	5
UK Singles (OCC)	87
US Dance Club Play (Billboard)	44
US Modern Rock Tracks (Billboard)	6

=== Year-end charts ===
Chart (1989)	Position
Australia (ARIA)	73

== Release history ==
Region	Date	Format	Label	Ref.
Australia	28 August 1989	7-inch vinyl; 12-inch vinyl; CD; cassette	CBS	
United Kingdom	18 September 1989	7-inch vinyl; 12-inch vinyl; CD	Mercury	
Japan	25 March 1990	Mini-CD	Alfa	

== Other versions ==
- Something For Kate vocalist and guitarist Paul Dempsey released a cover on his 2025 solo album Shotgun Karaoke Vol.II.
