= Saskia Post =

American-born Australian actress (1960–2020)

- Born: Saskia Steenkamer; 1 August 1960; Martinez, California, US
- Died: 16 March 2020 (aged 59); Melbourne, Australia
- Occupation: Actress
- Years active: 1982–2020

Saskia Post (1 August 1960 – 16 March 2020) was a US-born Australian actress. She is best known for her leading role in the 1986 film Dogs in Space. Post also acted in the 1985 film Bliss and the 1991 film Proof, as well as numerous Australian television series.

== Early life ==
Saskia Post was born in Martinez, California, in 1961. Her Dutch parents moved between America and Japan, before settling in Australia in 1975. At high school she studied acting and singing and after completing high school she spent a year attending acting workshops and dance classes in Sydney. She studied writing at RMIT. She then commenced a degree course in drama and arts at the University of New South Wales but gave it up after 12 months to attend a full-time course at The Drama Studio in Sydney in 1981.

== Career ==
Shortly after completing her studies, Post obtained her first television role as Julianna Sleven, a Dutch refugee, in The Sullivans, an Australian drama television series about an average middle-class Melbourne family and the effect World War II had on their lives. Post moved to Melbourne and worked on the series for 12 months before leaving in 1984 to take part in the John Duigan film One Night Stand, in which she played Eva, a Czech-born bank teller.

In 1985, Post appeared in the AFI Award winning film Bliss as Honey Barbara's daughter. This was followed in 1986 with a feature role in the Richard Lowenstein film Dogs in Space, a story about a group of young musicians and music fans sharing a house in the inner Melbourne suburb of Richmond. In the film, Post played the role of Anna, the girlfriend of Sam (Michael Hutchence).

Post also appeared in numerous stage productions in Melbourne and Sydney, including Hating Alison Ashley, Salome, Endgrain, Train to Transcience, Could I Have this Dance?, In Angel Gear and Figures in Glass both directed by friend Robert Chuter, Skin and Vincent in Brixton.

== Personal life and death ==
Post lived her final years in Trentham, Victoria, where she worked as a transpersonal art therapist and worked at a local primary school as an integration aide.

Post died following a cardiac arrest from complications stemming from a congenital heart condition, at the Alfred Hospital in Melbourne on 16 March 2020. She was 59.

== Filmography ==
=== Film ===
Year	Title	Role	Notes
1984	One Night Stand	Eva	Feature film
1985	Bliss	Harry's Daughter	Feature film
1986	Dogs in Space	Anna	Feature film
1991	Proof	Waitress	Feature film
1997	True Love and Chaos	Sam	Feature film
2009	We're Livin' on Dog Food	Herself	Film documentary
2017	Throbbin' 84	Doreen	Film (final role)

=== Television ===
Year	Title	Role	Notes
1982	The Sullivans	Julianna Sleven	TV series
1982–1983	Sons and Daughters	Kerry Mitchell	TV series, 15 episodes
1985	A Country Practice	Michelle Longet	TV series, 2 episodes
1986	Return to Eden	Jessica Stewart	TV series, 11 episodes
1987	A Country Practice	Pammie Allen	TV series, 2 episodes
1991	All Together Now	Susan	TV series, episode: "Stuck on You"
1996	Ocean Girl	Hypnotherapist	TV series, 1 episode
2000	Introducing Gary Petty	Emily	TV series, 6 episodes
2000	Eugénie Sandler P.I.	Angela Duvier	TV series, 11 episodes
2002	Short Cuts	Louise	TV series
2010	City Homicide	Gloria Beck	TV series, 1 episode

== Stage ==
Year	Title	Role	Venue / Co.
1989	Salome	Salome	Crossroads Theatre, Sydney
1990	In Angel Gear	Karin	St Martins Youth Arts Centre, Melbourne
1990	Advice from a Caterpillar		La Mama, Melbourne, Universal Theatre, Melbourne
1990	Figures in Glass		Irene Mitchell Studio, Melbourne
1993	Train to Transience: All Aboard / Dead Ahead / In Transit / Feast		Irene Mitchell Studio, Melbourne
1993	Could I Have This Dance?		Melbourne Athenaeum
1995	Skin		Top of the Town, Melbourne
1996	Endgrain		Napier Street Theatre, Melbourne
2003; 2004	A Night of Grand Guignol (Laboratory of Hallucinations; Three Skeleton Key; Tics, or Doing the Deed)		Carlton Courthouse, Melbourne, Colac Otways Performing Arts and Cultural Centre, Karralyka Centre, Upper Yarra Arts and Entertainment Centre, Harrison Theatre, Swan Hill, Knox Community Arts Centre, Bayswater, Ruffy Public Hall with La Mama
2005	Vincent in Brixton	Ursula Loyer	Red Stitch Actors Theatre, Melbourne
2008	Sushi Wushi Woo		Australian Centre of Performing Arts, Melbourne
	Hating Alison Ashley		
