= Shit for brains =

Shit for brains may refer to:

- "Glory for the Shit for Brains, a 1987 LP by Australian rock band No
- "Shit for Brains", a 1989 single by English industrial musician PIG
