= David Brown (Australian musician) =

Australian musician

- Also known as: Candlesnuffer
- Born: David Michael Brown; 1956 (age 68–69); Melbourne, Victoria, Australia
- Genres: Jazz; heavy metal; experimental
- Occupation: Musician
- Instruments: Bass guitar; guitar; percussion
- Years active: 1978–present
- Website: candlesnuffer.org

David Michael Brown (born 1956) is an Australian musician. He played bass guitar or guitar in improvisatory ensembles beginning in 1978. His solo material is issued under the name Candlesnuffer.

== Early life ==
David Brown was born in 1956 and raised in Melbourne, Australia.

His music career started in 1978, when David Tolley(Brown's teacher) formed False Start with funding from the Music Board of the Australia Council. Brown played bass guitar and guitar.

From 1978 to 1983, Brown played guitar and percussion in Signals, with David Wadelton, Chris Knowles, and Philip Thomson. They performed at the Clifton Hill Community Music Centre and La Mama Theatre, as well as art exhibitions (such as the Biennale of Sydney) and galleries.

In 1983, Brown played bass guitar with Jamie Fielding and Philip Thomson as Skeleton.

From 1983 to 1985 he performed in Mulch, with Mark Ewenson and Tom Fielding.

From 1985 to 1987, Brown played in Ultratune with Robert Corbett and Terry McDermott.

In 1987, Brown joined Dumb And The Ugly with Michael Sheridan and John Murphy.

In 1992, he formed Bucketrider, a jazz / heavy metal group, with Sean Baxter, Tim O'Dwyer, Adam Simmons, and James Wilkinson.

In 1995, Brown and Sean Baxter formed a duo called Lazy.

In 1996 he formed Terminal Hz, a trio with Sean Baxter and KK Null. He also performed in The Crowded Foxhole with Louis Peake, Sean Baxter, and Tim O'Dwyer.

Brown has performed at numerous festivals and exhibitions, such as What Is Music, Next Wave, and Cinesonic.
