= Browning Mummery (electronic sound works) =

- Also known as: boxmusik
- Origin: Sydney, Australia
- Genres: electronic music/post punk/industrial music
- Years active: 1983–present
- Labels: Obelisk, Vinyl On Demand, Inner City Uprising, Novichok, Tesco Archaic Documents, CCP, Ice Age Productions
- Members: Andrew Lonsdale
- Past members: John Murphy; Max Hawk; Gavin Williams

The early dark wave band Browning Mummery began in Sydney in 1983, formed by Australian electronic musician Andrew Lonsdale (born 1961), as both a collaborative and solo entity for electronic sound works.

== History ==
Created by Andrew Lonsdale who began producing electronic and experimental music in Rockhampton, Queensland, Australia in 1980; releasing work in the early 80s Australian electronic/industrial/experimental music scene, including early Browning Mummery cassettes as well as others by boxmusik, ismISM (aka 47 1/2), and Atomic Disease (with late artist Nigel Gurney). In the early 80s Andrew performed as both boxmusik and Browning Mummery, and also played in several post-punk bands including Wrong Kind Of Stone Age and Mutant Death; in the late 90s Andrew recorded with John Murphy in industrial band Shining Vril.

Browning Mummery first performed live in 1983 in a live air radio performance on 2MBS-FM in Sydney, released on the Lunakhod cassette album (Cntmprr-ydtns, 1984, series compilation with Severed Heads, Bleak, and others). Browning Mummery has appeared on many other compilations including BNE (Transcom, 2014) and All My Sins Remembered – The Sonic Worlds of John Murphy (Epicurean, 2016); the 2010 CD compilation Artefacts of Australian Experimental Music: volume ii 1973–1984 (Shame File Music, 2011); and in the Vinyl On Demand "Magnetophonics" box set (2016). The film/performance Square by Jo Cunynghame, with Browning Mummery's soundtrack, was a feature at Melbourne's Arts Festival (1985); several other independent films, stage performances, and installations have featured Browning's work. Browning Mummery also has had several tape albums re-released on vinyl since 2016. The Obiter Scripta album (1984) is a key release, having been issued and reissued several times.

The Browning Mummery sound is genre-defying: drawing on experimental influences as well as techniques from dub, improvisation, industrial music, musique concrète, montage / cut-up, and environmental soundscaping. Browning Mummery has evolved from using tape and analog gear for composition and recording (including home-built instruments and processors by SwSw Thrght), to the use of digital equipment and computer-based techniques since 1988. Browning Mummery has also performed live on many FM radio stations around Australia, including 4ZZZ (1999, 2004), 2RSR (1983), 2MBS (1982–85), as well as on American and European FM radio playlists in the 1980s, and live in Berlin in 2015.

Based in Brisbane since 1993, the project continues to perform and release electronic music, often with collaborations. John Murphy was a member from 1987 until his death in 2015; the late Gavin Williams from Wrong Kind of Stone Age (1960–2020) was an early member, and Max Hawk (1961–2009) from Electric Tipi also played with the project from 1993.

== Releases ==
=== Cassettes ===
- Evidence of Ritual, c30, (Boxmusik, BOX2, 1983)
- Oracles & Prescriptions, c60, (Boxmusik, BOX3, 1983)
- Obiter Scripta, c60, (Boxmusik, BOX5, 1984)
- Rustic Acts Without Reality, (Cntmprr-ydtns, 1984), (Lunakhod compilation)
- Opera, c60, (Cosmic Conspiracy Productions, Cabal C-023, 1989)
- (Untitled), c30, (No Labels Interested, 2020), (End-Tek / Browning Mummery split cassette)

=== CDs ===
- Browning Mummery, (Obelisk, ObeliskCD01, 1997)
- The best time to buy is when the blood is flowing in the streets, (Obelisk, 1998) (Limited edition CDR)
- Audiomorphica, (Obelisk, 2005) (Limited edition CDR)
- Music For Torture & Interrogation, (Obelisk, 2006) (Limited edition CDR)
- Songs of the Bicardiac Assembly, (Obelisk, 2009) (Limited edition CDR)
- Man In A Hole, (Obelisk, 2010) (Limited edition CDR)
- Fields Of Stone, (Obelisk, 2010) (Limited edition CDR)
- Epistle To The Zone Enders, (Ice Age Productions, 2013) (Limited edition CDR & online release)
- Live / Berlin And Melbourne, (Inner City Uprising, 2021) (Limited edition CDR)

=== LPs ===
- Songs Of The Bicardiac Assembly, (Obelisk ObeliskLP01, 2008)
- Borderlands, (Vinyl On Demand, VOD144, 2016)
- Obiter Scripta, (Tesco Archaic Documents, ARCHAIC 010, 2016)

=== Singles ===
- Lament For Comrade Time, (Novichok, NVK006, 2021), (split 45 rpm single with Krang Music: How I Want To .... Ronald Reagan)

=== Film/Video/Soundtracks ===
- Light Industry, 10 min. 8 mm film soundtrack, (1983) (film – P&J Productions)
- Soldiers of the Cross, 10 min. 8 mm film + soundtrack, (1984) (film – BM)
- Square, 25 min. 16 mm film soundtrack, (1984–85) (film – Jo Cunnynghame)
- FOI, Optus Localvision documentary, (1998) (station interview, live footage, and sound)
- Chop Wood, 10 min video soundtrack (2003) (film – B. Paradise)
