= Wrong Kind of Stone Age =

Australian musical group

- Origin: Sydney, New South Wales, Australia
- Genres: Post punk, instrumental rock
- Years active: 1983–1991
- Label: InsideOut
- Past members: Gavin Williams; Miriam Williamson; Drew Mayson; Andy Lonsdale; Jodi Grist; Jeremy Vermeesch; Geoff Nolan; Craig McLeod; Bryce Cannon; Andy Rantzen

Wrong Kind of Stone Age was an Australian post-punk band formed in 1983 in inner-city Sydney by Gavin Williams (of Sydney punk band Identity X) and Miriam Williamson. The early Wrong Kind of Stone Age sound was a unique and wild fusion of post-punk attitude and bottom-heavy sonic distortion with strong dub and tribal influences, using Miriam's vocal range. They used occasional tape montage, didgeridoo, clarinet, or electronic noise.

Following some notorious inaugural performances, and the release of their first tape, Grace and Grossness, Wrong Kind of Stone Age soon attracted an appreciative audience, and built an enduring reputation. They regularly partnered with bands such as the Wet Taxis, Bloodloss, and Box of Fish; one show at the Rehearsal Room in Redfern attracted the Tactical Response unit. Wrong Kind of Stone Age supported the Dead Kennedys at Sefton, in Sydney's west, on their 1983 Australian tour. Jello Biafra at the time described them as "one of the best morbid-ambient post-punk bands I've ever seen or heard".

The band's lineup shifted considerably in the first year or so of existence: alongside Miriam and Gavin could sometimes be found Drew Mayson, Andy Lonsdale, Jodi Grist, Jeremy Vermeesch, Geoff Nolan, and others.

By 1984, in time for their only vinyl recordings, the membership stabilized as Gavin Williams (guitar), Miriam Williamson (voice), Geoff Nolan (bass), Craig McLeod (drums). The Flying Low to Batavia EP was released in Sydney in 1984, and sold rapidly. For several years this highly acclaimed four-piece played at many infamous inner-Sydney venues, like The Britannia and The Sandringham, although only a handful of tracks would be recorded and released.

By the late 80s the style and the band members had shifted again: the sound became even more dub-infused, deprecating the 'grungy' bottom end and making stronger use of electronica and Middle Eastern-styled rhythms (while losing none of its uniqueness). The tribal lineup by the end of the decade consisted of Miriam and Gavin, with Bryce Cannon (percussion), Andy Rantzen (keyboards), and Drew Mayson (guitar). In 1989, Wrong Kind of Stone Age released a cassette LP, Traditional Musik, on the Cosmic Conspiracy Productions label which was noted as "a significant label" by Shannon O'Neill in his article in Experimental Music: Audio Explorations in Australia. The band was playing live at venues such as the Evil Star (Evening Star Hotel), which O'Neill also mentions were where the Cosmic Conspiracy label events were held, organized by label owner and 2MBS-FM radio broadcaster, Alex Karinsky. Probably the most successful lineup, they were renowned for often spellbinding performances.

The band began to fragment in the early 90s. The last Wrong Kind of Stone Age performances were in 1991, with a hard-edged instrumental dub set, performed by Gavin Williams (guitar, rhythms, percussion), Drew Mayson (guitar), Andy Lonsdale (synthesizer, tapes, mixing).

Miriam Williamson recorded with Pelican Daughters, and Itch-e & Scratch-e (formed by Andy Rantzen and Paul Mac), in the early 1990s; she is creating new material as Princess Universe. Itch-e & Scratch-e, with Miriam, won an Aria award for their track Sweetness and Light (Itch-E & Scratch-E, Itch-E Kitch-E Koo, Second Nature/Volition, 1993). Wrong Kind of Stone Age samples are also used on Pelican Daughters recordings (Pelican Daughters, Fishbones and Wishbones, Silent Records, 1991: Pelican Daughters, Bliss, Silent Records, 1994). Wrong Kind of Stone Age tracks appear on several 1990s compilations—Go and Do It(1996), and Bloodstains Across Australia(1998). Gavin Williams plays on the 1989 Browning Mummery track The Sorcerer's Philosophy, (Browning Mummery CD, Obelisk, 1996).

== Discography ==
=== Albums ===
- Grace and Grossness - Cassette LP, Sydney, 1983
- Traditional Musik- Cosmic Conspiracy Productions (Cabal C-010) (1989) (Cassette LP)

=== EPs ===
- Flying Low to Batavia - White Label (1984) (7-inch EP)

=== Compilations ===
- Not So Humdrum - Aberrant Records (1984) (songs: "The End" & "Criminal")
- Go and Do It - Small Axe (1996) (songs:"The End" & "Criminal")
- Bloodstains Across Australia - Bloodstains (1998) (song: "Run Amok")
