= We're Livin' on Dog Food =

2009 Australian documentary film

We're Living' on Dog Food is a 2009 Australian documentary about the Melbourne underground music scene of 1977–81, including the little band scene. It was directed by Richard Lowenstein.

== Interviewees ==
- Philip Brophy
- Alannah Hill
- Rowland S. Howard
- Ollie Olsen
- Primitive Calculators
