= Taipan Tiger Girls =

Taipan Tiger Girls is an experimental drone band based in Melbourne, Australia. The line-up consists of Ollie Olsen (synthesiser), Mat Watson (drums) and Lisa MacKinney (guitar). The band formed in 2014 with Watson and Olsen, MacKinney joining later.

The band released its debut album, 1, in February 2015 on It Records, an improvised live recording. The release was a limited edition of 100 vinyl LPs that sold out in a week, and was also released on CD and download. TheMusic rated it 3.5/5, saying "Their highly recommended sound is a monster kosmische grind that writhes and hypnotises". Bob Fish of Cyclic Defrost described their track, "Motion" and how they "make long and beautiful walls of noise, intricate and psychedelic; delicate and tough."

Their follow-up album "2", was released in August 2016, also on It Records. "2" was recorded and mixed by Kalju Tonuma and received No. 1 Feature Record at PBS FM.
