= Michael Sheridan (musician) =

Australian musician

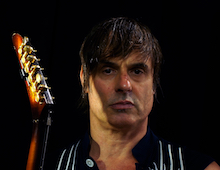

Background information
- Born: Melbourne, Victoria, Australia
- Instruments: Guitars, programmable devices
- Years active: 1975–present

Michael Sheridan is an Australian guitarist. Having played and recorded with an array of artists his versatility in original music spans the styles of rock, jazz, punk, industrial, metal, and sonic art including glitch and noise. He has released solo works such as Scaleshack and Digital Jamming, and collaborations with Nicholas Littlemore and associates. He has been a member of several bands since 1975, including No (1987–1989) with Ollie Olsen and Marie Hoy, which were described as "One of Australia's most compelling stage acts incorporating speed metal, hip hop and electro funk". In 1989 he followed Olsen to join Max Q with Michael Hutchence of INXS on vocals.

== Early life and career ==
Sheridan was born and raised in Melbourne. In the 1970s, whilst still at secondary school, he became fascinated by the guitar playing of Jimi Hendrix and others. He has been a member of several bands since 1975. Sheridan moved to Sydney to further his interest in improvised music. In 1982 he formed a jazz-punk outfit, Great White Noise, which included Sandy Evans, Diane Spence, Lenny Bastiaans, Tony Buck, John Gillies, soon followed by an improvisation group, Slaughter House 3, with Jon Rose and John Gillies. By the mid-1980s Sheridan had moved back to Melbourne and formed Transwaste with Jamie Fielding and Peter Jones. He also played in Whaddya Want? with David Chesworth.

In 1987 Sheridan, on lead guitar, joined an electro-punk band, No, with Marie Hoy on keyboards and samples, Kevin McMahon on bass guitar and Ollie Olsen on vocals, samples and keyboards. Australian musicologist, Ian McFarlane, described them as "the ultimate crossover act due to its confrontational fusion of hardcore energy, abrasive heavy metal guitar riffs, electro-funk beats and acid-house grooves." Sheridan and Olsen also work with Michael Hutchence (of INXS) in Max Q (1989–90). While still a member of No, Sheridan formed Dumb and the Ugly (1987–93) with John Murphy on drums and noise tapes (ex-the Wreckery) and David Brown on bass guitar.

In 1990 Sheridan released a solo CD, Scaleshack, utilising sampling and dub techniques. Soon after he joined Peril, with Tony Buck, Otomo Yoshihide, and Kato Hideki. From 1991 to 1993 he was also a member of RAW with Barry Deenik on bass guitar, Ross Wilson on lead vocals (ex-Mondo Rock) and Craig Waugh on drums (ex-Uncanny X-Men). McFarlane observed that they "played an aggressive blend of rock and funk but, aside from building up a strong cult following on the Australian pub circuit, the band did not issue any recordings before breaking up."

Sheridan's next solo CD, Digital Jamming, was released in 1996 also features performances by Jon Rose and Jim Denley. Both Scaleshack and Digital Jamming were later re-released by Shame File Music. Sheridan also studied and completed a Bachelor of Music degree at the Sydney Conservatorium of Music 2000, and qualified as a teacher and composer. In March 2012 a quartet with Sheridan on eight-string guitar, Chris Abrahams on piano, John Gillies on percussion and Jon Rose on violin performed and recorded Improvisation at People's Republic in Sydney.

== Discography ==
=== Albums ===
==== Solo projects ====
- Cell Block (1983, solo guitar recorded East Sydney Tech. cassette limited release, Pedestrian Tapes)
- Post Transwaste '85 (1985, solo guitar recorded Trinity College Chapel, cassette limited release, No Label)
- Scaleshack (1990, CD, Digital Download, Bandcamp published 2019, Zenith Wa Records, ZWR_01) https://scaleshack.bandcamp.com/
- Digital Jamming (1996, CD, Black Hole Records, HOLE018. Digital Download, Bandcamp published 2020, Zenith Wa Records, ZWR_018) https://michaelsheridan-soloproject.bandcamp.com/

==== Collaborative and compilation albums ====
- March of the Five Limbs - Keys Music Association - Double vinyl LP, 1982 (compilation: Great White Noise, The Freeboppers, John Gilles Duo, under former name Mike Tinney) Hot Records, Australia, KMALP 8301-2
- Jon Rose / Forward Of Short Leg - vinyl LP [(Slawterhaus Band rec.1983, under former name Michael Tinney) Published 1987, Dossier Records, Berlin, Dossier ST 7529]
- Beyond The Southern Cross - Australian and New Zealand Bands - Double vinyl Lp. [rec. 1983, published 1984 (Great White Noise) INK Records, subsidiary of Red Flame, United Kingdom INK 4D]
- Live at the Wireless - Compilation, The EP, 12" vinyl (1983, Great White Noise recorded live JJJ 105.7 FM - Sydney, Australia)
- Jon Rose Fringe Benefits - double CD compilation (History of the recorded music label Fringe Benefits - An Australian Archive 1977 - 1985) Entropy Stereo Recordings, Ann Arbor, Mi USA. Entropy 006
- Transwaste - Collection - album, Digital Download ('Best Of' recorded 1984, Bandcamp published 2019, Zenith Wa Records, ZWR_06)
- Ecco Homo - Motor Cycle Baby, 12" vinyl Ep (1988, Copyright & Pub. RooArt, Sydney Australia, 872 261-1)
- NO - Glory For The Shit For Brains - vinyl LP (1988, Ultimate Records, Melbourne, ULP 001)
- NO - Self Titled - 12" vinyl EP, (1989, Augo-go, Melbourne, Australia, ANDA 81)
- NO - Once We Were Scum Now We Are God, vinyl LP, (recorded live 1990, Ltd. Ed. pack includes poster & 12" single 200 Years, Augo-go, Melbourne, Australia, ANDA 94)
- MAX Q - Self Titled - LP vinyl (1989, Oceania Recording, CBS inc. Aust & USA. CBS 465906 1)
- MAX Q - Self Titled - CD album (1989, Oceania Recording, CBS inc. Aust & USA. CBS 465906 2)
- MAX Q - Self Titled - LP cassette (1989, Oceania Recording, CBS inc. Aust & USA. CBS 465906 4)
- MAX Q - Way Of The World - 12" EP vinyl (1989, Todd Terry 12" & 7" mixes: Zero 2 0, and, Ghost Of The Year mix, Oceania Recording, CBS inc. Aust & USA CBS 555555 6)
- MAX Q - Way Of The World - 7" Single, vinyl (1989, Todd Terry 7" mix including Zero 2 0, Oceania Recording, CBS inc. Aust & USA CBS 555555 7)
- MAX Q - Way Of The World - CD Single (1989, Todd Terry 7" mix including Zero 2 0, Oceania Recording, CBS inc. Aust & USA CBS 555555 2)
- MAX Q - Sometimes - 7" Single, vinyl (1989, Todd Terry's Straight Rock Mix, Love Man remix by Todd Terry & Mark Harder, Oceania Recording, CBS inc. Aust & USA CBS 655419 7)
- MAX Q - Sometimes - CD Single (1989, Todd Terry's Straight Rock Mix, Love Man remix by Todd Terry & Mark Harder, Oceania Recording, CBS inc. Aust & USA CBS 655419 2)
- MAX Q - Monday Night By Satellite 7" Single, vinyl (1989, B side - Ot-Ven-Rot, Oceania Recording, CBS inc. Aust & USA CBS 655655 7)
- MAX Q - Sometimes - 12" EP vinyl (1989, Todd Terry Mixes: Rock House Extended & Dub Mix, Love Man remix by Todd Terry & Mark Harder, Oceania Recording, CBS inc. Aust & USA CBS 655419 6)
- MAX Q - Sometimes - 12" EP vinyl (1989, Paul Oakenfold Mixes: Future Mix, Land Of Oz Mix, Land Of Oz Instrumental Mix, Oceania Recording, CBS inc. Aust & USA 655419 0)
- Dumb & the Ugly - Self titled - Mini LP 12" vinyl (published 1990, recorded 1989, Doctor Jim's, Melbourne, Australia, Dr JIM 2)
- Vampyroteutis Infernalis - Bummer Vol.1 - vinyl single 7", 1990 (Compilation: Dumb & the Ugly, Hugo Race, Fetish 69, Practical Folk Music, ltd. ed. 600, Vampyroteutis Infernalis Record label, pressing 092021, Germany.
- Dumb & the Ugly - Self titled - Single 7" vinyl (published 1991, recorded 1990, Doctor Jim's, Melbourne, Australia, Dr JIM 3)
- BLUNT 12 solid gold inner-city hits - LP vinyl compilation (1991, Dumb & the Ugly, Modern Records, Sydney, Australia, BLUNT-003)
- Dumb & the Ugly - Atmospheres Of Metal - CD album (published 1992, Doctor Jim's, Melbourne, Australia, Dr JIM 6)
- SCOURGE - Scourge - Single 7" vinyl, 1993 (Phoenix - co-production with Adam Quaife, Platinum Studios) Death Valley Records, Melbourne, Australia, DV-003
- PERIL - Peril - CD album, 1993, Dr Jims Records, Melbourne, Australia, Dr JIM 7.
- FOIL - Affirmative - CD EP, 1993 (Co-production and guitar) Melbourne, Australia, EP CD02 - Winter 1993
- PERIL - Multiverse - CD album, 1994, Sound Factory Hong Kong, distributed by Black Hole Recordings Melbourne, Australia, SFCD 015
- Lucy Guerin - Incarnadine - Dance Duet, 1994 - Lucy Guerin - Director & choreography. James Lo - sound design/composition. Solo guitar track 'Grief' from Scaleshack II cassette. https://vimeo.com/711006349
- Kerri Simpson - Vévé - The Arousing - CD album 1995, Shock Records, Melbourne, Australia, SPUD CD 002
- Kerri Simpson & Vévé - Speak - CD album 1996, Pub. Karmic hit, Cop. Kerri Simpson, KH 005
- Stephen Cummings - Escapist - CD album,1996, [Your'e A Dream (Cummins/Burstin) - with John Murphy - drums] Polydor Records, Australia, 5318402
- Psy-Harmonics Volume 3 - Hacking The Reality Myth, CD Compilation, 1996 (MAX Q - Sometimes - budget Truffles Mix) Polygram Music Publishing, PSY003
- Martin & Peter Wesley-Smith - QUITO - CD album, 1997(a Documentary Drama about schizophrenia & East Timor, Music by Martin, lyrics by Peter) Tall Poppies Records, Sydney, Australia, TP111.
- Professional test Record - Black Hole - CD album, 1997 (Antilogue - with David Quinn) Black Hole Records, HOLE019
- Primitive Ghost - SKIN - CD EP, 1998 (with Ollie Olsen, Baby Lemonade, Lucky Rich, Fab, and Bryan St James) P & C Warner Music Australia, 3984241072
- Primitive Ghost - UNRELEASED - album, 1999, Recorded at Sing Sing Studios, P & C Warner Music Australia, unreleased
- Monique Brumby - Wrecking Ball - The Eventide EP - CD 1998 (guitar on Wrecking Ball) Sony Music Australia, 666470 2
- Ju Ju Space Jazz - Intersound - CD album 2000, C & P Kookyburra Droppings, www.clubkooky.com, Sydney Australia, KBDCD 005
- David Bridie - Act of free Choice - CD album, 2000 (Produced & Mixed by Ian Caples Brixton, London, UK) P & C EMI 7243 5 30180 2 3
- Ambi-Ant Beatz - A Chill Out Journey - Double CD album compilation, 2000 (Dumb & the Ugly - Atmosphere 145º ) GA04, green ant.com
- Smeagol's Workshop - The Creation Series Volume 1 - CD album compilation, 2002, Copyright dreameyesentertainment.com 2002
- Monique Brumby - Driving Home - CD EP, 2003 (guitar on Nobody's Perfect) P & C Monique Brumby for Little Wind records & Productions, M1 250
- Melanie Oxley and Chris Abrahams - Blood Oranges - CD album, 2003, distribution Vitamin Records, P & C Remote Music, Sydney, Australia, rem5
- YUNYU - Twisted Tales - Quirtz Download Album, 2012 (Twisted Tales - A Song Cycle, Guitar on: BlueBeard, Butterflies, Red, Snegurochka, Matchgirl) https://yunyu.bandcamp.com/
- All My Sins Remembered - The Sonic Worlds of John Murphy - 3CD Set & booklet, 2016 (Mandrix rec. live1975 - Evolution, Dumb & the Ugly - Lunacy 145º from the album Atmospheres of Metal) Berlin, Germany, The Epicurian cure.10
- Barney McAll TXQ - Global Intimacy, CD album & Digital Download, 2018 (Facebook Killed the Arts, written by Barney McAll & SIA) Produced by Barney McAll TorniquetX, Extra Celestial Arts, Melb. Australia
- The Two Leaves - A Nicholas Littlemore & Michael Sheridan collaboration - Obtusifolia, Digital Download LP, 2018 (guitar and processing. includes guest track The Pool with Latasha Alcindor) Spotify, Apple Music.
- YUNYU - Pirates of the Silk Road - single track, 2019 (VR mod for Beat Sabre - Composition collaboration, guitar) https://yunyu.bandcamp.com/track/pirates-of-the-silk-road
- Cherry2000 - Banned For Life - album, 2019 (recorded and produced by Cherry2000 2013 -19, Rachael Lafferty, Andy Ranzen, Julie Kim, Michael Sheridan, Digital Download LP) https://cherry-2000.bandcamp.com/
- DARKGLOVE with Hellen Rose & Li'l Mac - LONG LOST SOUL - album, 2020 (Produced by Michael Sheridan, Greg Williams, Carl Manuell, Digital Download LP) https://darkglove.bandcamp.com/album/long-lost-soul
- DARKGLOVE with Hellen Rose - 7" vinyl EP, Ltd. Ed. of 200, 2020 (Co-produced by Zenith Wa Records and Vital Music) Three tracks selected from the album: Long Lost Soul, Chicago Street Prayer, Entrapment Dub. Zenith Wa Records https://darkglove.bandcamp.com/album/long-lost-soul
- DARKGLOVE - MURDA - Digital Download / Streaming album, 2022 (Produced by Michael Sheridan) Zenith Wa Records https://darkglove.bandcamp.com/album/murda
- BROWNING MUMMERY - Digital Download / Streaming Compilation album, Sashimi Halloween 2022. Track 4, Circling the Body https://sashimmyrecords.bandcamp.com/album/sashimmy-halloween-2022
- DARKGLOVE - MURDA - 7" vinyl EP, Ltd. Ed. of 200, 2023 (Co-produced by Zenith Wa Records and Vital Music) Three tracks selected from the album: https://darkglove.bandcamp.com
- DARKGLOVE - RAIN - Digital Download / Streaming album, 2023 (Produced by Michael Sheridan) Zenith Wa Records https://darkglove.bandcamp.com/album/rain
- BROWNING MUMMERY - Digital Download / Streaming Compilation album, Sashimi Halloween 2023. Track 2, C25T25 - aethyr mix.https://sashimmyrecords.bandcamp.com/track/c25t25-aethyr-mix-browning-mummery
- DARKGLOVE - RAIN - LISMORE TRIBUTE - 7" vinyl EP, Ltd. Ed. of 200, 2024 (Co-produced by Zenith Wa Records and Vital Music ZWR-20) Three tracks selected from the album: https://darkglove.bandcamp.com
- BROWNING MUMMERY - Digital Download / Streaming Compilation album, Sashimi Halloween 2024. Track 2, Foot of The Mountain https://sashimmyrecords.bandcamp.com/track/foot-of-the-mountain-browning-mummery
- BLASTLINE ASSEMBLY - Digital Download / Streaming Compilation album, 2025. Track 1, G.O.D. SPEED 50 - DARK GLOVE. Track 5, Cut Snakes - DARKGLOVE. Track 6 - CHRONOS : Aether, Chaos & Egg - SHEZ. Track 7, SOUL IN LAND (tech wreck mix) BROWNING MUMMERY. Zenith Wa Records ZWR_23. https://blastlineassembly.bandcamp.com/album/room-7
- BROWNING MUMMERY - Digital Download / Streaming Compilation album, Sashimi Halloween 2025. Track 11, Black Flames. https://sashimmyrecords.bandcamp.com/track/black-flames-browning-mummery
- JUJU HORN - TOKYO DAWN - Digital Download / Streaming album. Collaboration: track 4, Tokyo Dawn. Track 5 2032. Released November 4, 2024. https://jujuhorn.bandcamp.com/album/tokyo-dawn
- BROWNING MUMMERY - Today Does Not Exist - Digital Download / Streaming album, Collaboration & co-production, 2025. https://browningmummery.bandcamp.com/album/today-does-not-exist
- DARKGLOVE - FOE - Digital Download / Streaming album, 2026 (Produced by Michael Sheridan) Zenith Wa Records, ZWR_24 https://darkglove.bandcamp.com/album/foe

=== Film soundtracks ===
- Dogs in Space - Written and Directed by Richard Lowenstein, 1986 (incidental guitar music) Copyright Skouras Pictures Midnightmovies.com MM DVD 003
- The Monkey's Mask - Directed by Samantha Lang, based on the book written by Dorothy Porter, 2000 (guitar on soundtrack) Australian Screen Sound Guild award for Soundtrack of the Year in 2001, Arena Film Production DVD MMA2016
- The Monkey's Mask - Single Gun Theory, CD Soundtrack 2001 (classical guitar on CD track 20 'Evidence') Australian Screen Sound Guild award for Soundtrack of the Year in 2001, ABC Classics 461 726-2
- Mystify - Michael Hutchence - A Documentary Film - Written, Directed and Produced by Richard Lowenstein, 2019 (sections of the film feature the music of Max Q, includes a visual appearance) Ghost Pictures, Australia.
- White Light - A George Gittoes production, 2019 (guitar theme composition throughout the film) Music Director Hellen Rose. Awarded, Best Feature Film Documentary Syracuse International Film Festival 2019, also winning the Sydney International Film Festival's Bassel Shehade Award for Social Justice.

=== Music videos ===
- Max Q - Way of the World, 1989 (Directed by Richard Lowenstein)
- Max Q - Sometimes, 1989 (Directed by Richard Lowenstein)
- Max Q - Monday Night by Satellite, 1989 (Directed by Richard Lowenstein)
- Primitive Ghost - Skin, 1998 (Directed by James Widdowson)

=== Australian television ===
- PERIL - The Noise on SBS Television- music documentary, directed by Annette Shun Wah ABC Television 1994,
- Dumb & the Ugly - The Noise on SBS - music documentary, Directed by Annette Shun Wah ABC Television 1994
