= Little Band scene =

Music scene

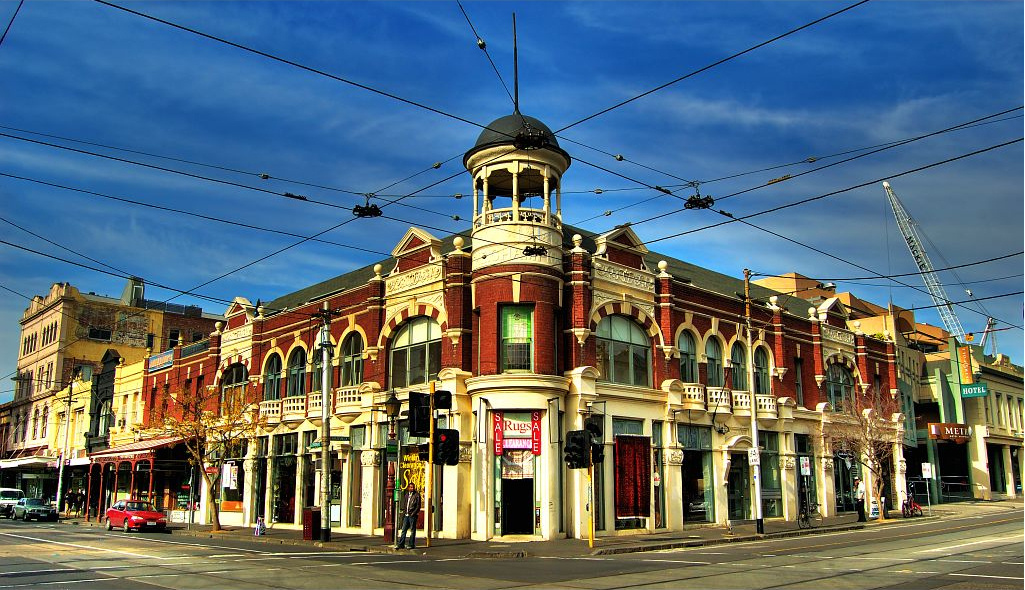
The Champion Hotel in Fitzroy was a popular venue among the little bands, hosting monthly "Little Band Nights" throughout much of 1979 and 1980.

The Little Band scene was an experimental post-punk scene which flourished in Melbourne, Victoria, Australia, from late 1978 until early 1981. Instigated by groups Primitive Calculators and Whirlywhirld, this scene was concentrated in the inner suburbs of Fitzroy and St Kilda, and involved many short-lived bands that played live only once or twice before changing names and swapping members.

The little bands played in small venues, often pubs, and their shows were recorded and broadcast by radio announcer Alan Bamford on community station 3RRR. In the scene, the distinctions between performers and audience were blurred, with many little bands made up of non-musicians on borrowed equipment and encouraging spontaneous participation during their shows.

The scene gave rise to several notable bands, including Dead Can Dance and Hunters & Collectors, and also served as the backdrop for the 1986 cult film Dogs in Space, starring INXS frontman Michael Hutchence. The little band concept has been intermittently revived into the 21st century, with the Melbourne Fringe Festival and a number of Melbourne pubs hosting Little Band Nights.

== History ==
"There were impromptu bands with noise guitars, drum machines, briefcase synthesisers, being played by people that had never learned to play music. The bands didn't really exist; they just played in loungerooms, and occasionally at venues. It was all low-tech equipment, but at the same time it was almost state-of-the-art, cutting-edge equipment—not what you'd consider rock'n'roll instrumentation."

— Ash Wednesday on the Little Band scene

In 1978, members of Primitive Calculators, an experimental post-punk group from Melbourne, formed a short-lived side band, the Leapfrogs. Using it as their own opening act, they decided to form other "little bands" with friends, Ollie Olsen and other members of Whirlywirld who lived next door to the group in Fitzroy North, with rehearsal spaces in each house. The little bands grew in number, sharing instruments and equipment, and the term "North Fitzroy Beat" was coined to describe their sound. Soon they started staging "Little Band Nights" at various inner city venues, notably the Champion Hotel in Fitzroy, the Crystal Ballroom in St Kilda and the Exford in Chinatown, with occasional appearances in Carlton, Collingwood and Richmond. At first, strict rules were imposed: no little band was allowed to play more than twice and could have no more than fifteen minutes worth of material. According to Primitive Calculators frontman Stuart Grant, it was "the punk ethos of disposability, novelty and working against the grain of the standard modes of procedure in the music business."

Many of the little bands were composed of painters, poets, filmmakers, performance artists, and other non-musicians who enjoyed the opportunity to realise their naive musical ideas. Little band member John Murphy explained that "a lot of the original participants were artists who applied the Dada sort of approach of their painting". One journalist described the little bands' output as "sloppy, clangy and discordant. By turns, they could sound equally fantastic: a mixture of epileptic drum machine rhythms, stabbing synth lines and creepy/witty lyrics making for oddly compelling results."

Some members of the scene had received proper training in electronic music and composition, including Whirlywirld's Ollie Olsen, who studied under Melbourne-based composer Felix Werder. Drummer Eve Bondarenko, a former member of Wimmins Circus and then the all-women feminist band Girls' Garage Band, left the band to join the Little Band scene (after which the band re-formed with a new drummer as Toxic Shock).

Little band member and radio announcer Alan Bamford began recording Little Band Nights using a TEAC reel-to-reel tape recorder and a Shure microphone. Immediately following each gig, he caught a tram to 3RRR's Fitzroy premises, where he broadcast the tapes on his midnight show. The scene continued to grow, and at later nights, up to ten little bands would perform.

The little bands interacted with other distinct post-punk scenes in Melbourne, such as the St Kilda scene centred at the Crystal Ballroom, where they occasionally supported The Birthday Party and Crime & the City Solution. The "wild and chaotic" nature of the little bands stood in stark contrast to "the more academic form of experimentalism" of Essendon Airport, Tsk Tsk Tsk, Paul Schütze, Ernie Althoff, and others associated with the Organ Factory, an artist-run space in Clifton Hill. According to Murphy, the little bands reviled the "Clifton Hill mob" for being against emotion in music, while Tsk Tsk Tsk founder Philip Brophy regarded the Little Band scene as anti-intellectual, and its music "harsh and sometimes painful".

After the Calculators and Whirlywirld left Melbourne for Europe and London in early 1980, the Little Band scene centred on the shared spaces of Use No Hooks and The Incredibly Strange Creatures Who Stopped Living and Became Mixed Up Zombies. The scene had effectively ended by early 1981.

=== Aftermath ===
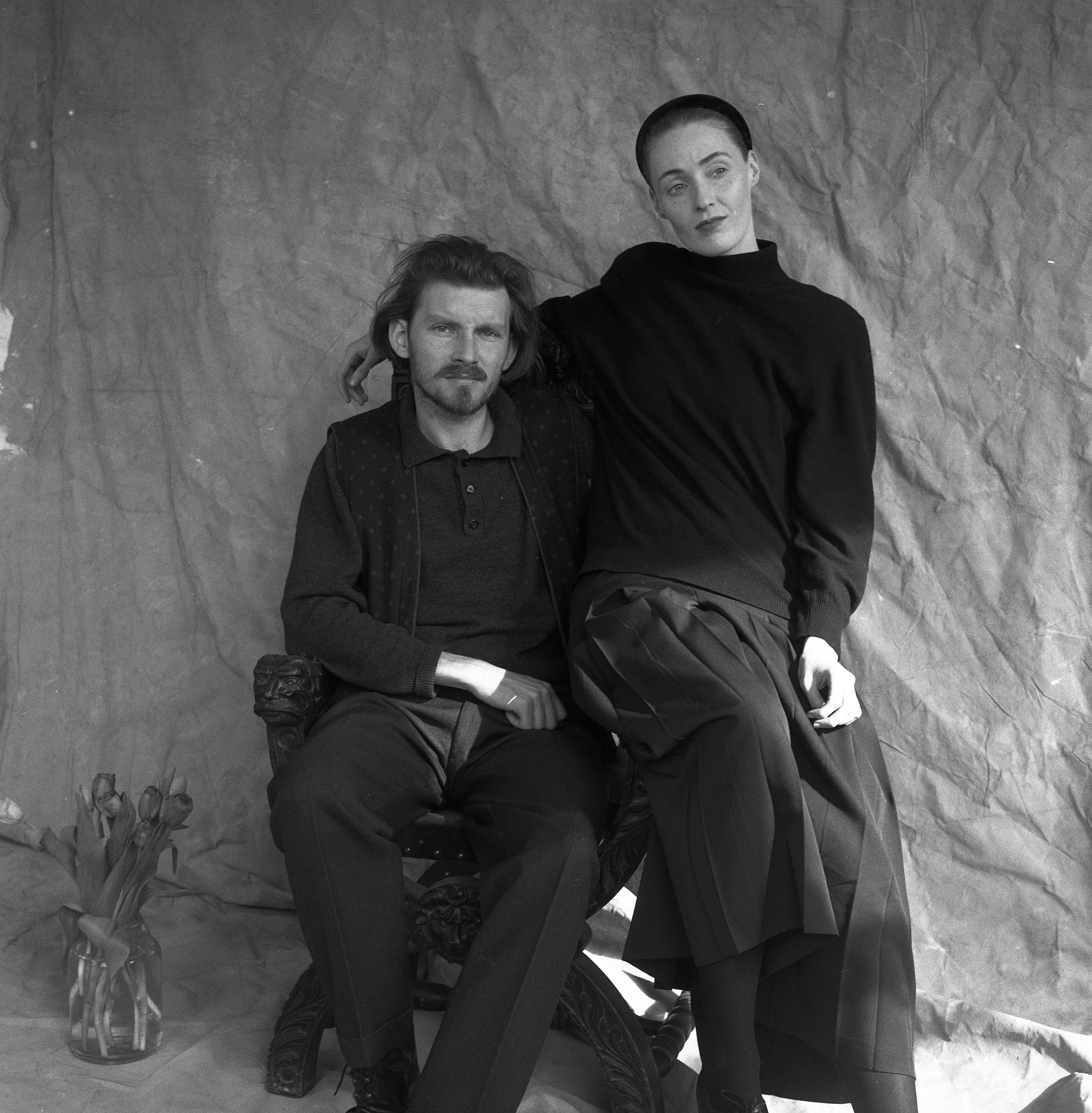
Dead Can Dance members Brendan Perry and Lisa Gerrard met in the Little Band scene.

Several lasting musical partnerships were forged in the scene: Lisa Gerrard and Brendan Perry went on to achieve international fame as Dead Can Dance; members of the Jetsonnes regrouped to form Hunters & Collectors; Kim Beissel and Chris Astley joined the Melbourne incarnation of Crime & the City Solution; and the Serious Young Insects later became Boom Crash Opera. Zorros also formed out of an impromptu jam during one of the Champion Hotel's Little Band Nights in early 1980.

== Recordings and releases ==
Alan Bamford collaborated with Max Robenstone, owner of Climax Records in Fitzroy, in paying for the pressing of Little Bands (1980), an EP featuring studio recordings by Morpions, Ronnie and the Rhythm Boys, The Take and Too Fat to Fit Through the Door. The first phase of the scene—up to the departure of the Calculators and Whirlywirld—was documented on an unreleased double LP, No Sin Like Dancing, that is catalogued in Clinton Walker's 1981 book Inner City Sound. Several little bands can also be found on the 1981 One Stop Shopping compilation curated by Severed Heads member Tom Ellard and released through Terse Tapes, as well as on issues of Fast Forward (1980–82), a cassette magazine founded and edited by Bruce Milne of Au Go Go Records. Bootleg copies of Alan Bamford's live recordings of the little bands are also known to exist.

Since the scene ended, little band recordings have appeared on Chapter Music releases, including the 2007 Primitive Calculators and Friends CD, the Can't Stop It! compilation series, and The Job (2020), which features previously unreleased Use No Hooks recordings. In 2016, German label Vinyl On Demand released Magnetophonics: Australian Underground Music 1978–1984, featuring several little bands.

== Legacy and influence ==
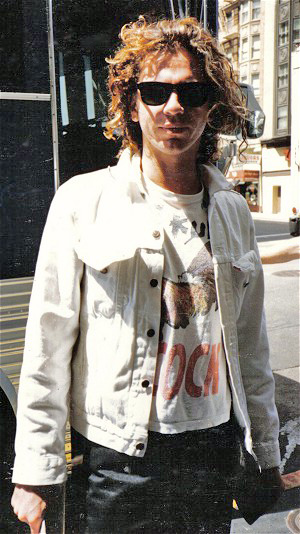
INXS frontman Michael Hutchence starred in Dogs in Space (1986), a film based on the Little Band scene.

Influenced by the little bands concept in Melbourne, post-punk group Pel Mel started a similar scene in Sydney in 1980, albeit smaller in scale and more studio-based.

The Little Band scene was fictionalised in the 1986 cult film Dogs in Space, directed by Richard Lowenstein and starring INXS frontman Michael Hutchence. Original little band Thrush and the Cunts appear with the song "Diseases", and little band figurehead Marie Hoy performs a cover of "Shivers" by the Boys Next Door. The live music scenes were supervised by Whirlywirld's Ollie Olsen, who also appears in the film. Coinciding with the film's long-awaited re-release, Lowenstein revisited Dogs in Space, the Little Band scene and Melbourne post-punk in general in the 2009 documentary We're Livin' on Dog Food, featuring rare footage and interviews with various members of the scene.

In 2010, the Melbourne Fringe Festival staged two shows dedicated to Little Band scene's ethos of ephemerality. Participants included members of contemporary bands the Boat People, the Crayon Fields, the Devastations, Dick Diver and Pikelet, among others. Chapter Music's Guy Blackman also participated, as well as members of Primitive Calculators with special guests the Take, an original little band which reformed for the first time in 30 years. Since then, several Melbourne venues, including The Tote, have helped to revive the little bands concept with shows often headlined by the reformed Primitive Calculators. On 14 June 2025, Chapter Music convened another Little Bands event sponsored by Rising at the Young and Jackson Hotel.

== List of little bands ==
Bands listed in bold went on to become fully fledged gigging groups.

- $2.50
- 66 Johnsons
- The Alan Bamford Musical Experience
- The Albert Hammond Megastar
- Anne's Dance Marathon Band
- The Art Circus
- Bags of Personality
- The Band of Hope and Glory
- The Beaumaris Tennis Club Quartet
- BeisselBoyceBoswell
- The Buck Stops Here
- The Child Molestor + 4
- Clang
- Club Allusion
- Company I Keep
- Consider Town Planning
- **Corporate Body**
- Delicatessants
- The Devils
- Dresden War Crimes
- The Eastwood Family
- The Egg
- The Franging Stuttgarters
- The Great Mastabini
- The Go Set
- **Government Drums**
- Hey There
- The Incredible Metronomic Blues Band
- **The Incredibly Strange Creatures Who Stopped Living and Became Mixed Up Zombies**
- Intro Muzak Band
- The Irreplacables
- The Ivan Durrants
- Invisible Music
- The J P Sartre Band
- **The Jetsonnes**
- Jim Buck Solo
- Jimmy Haemorrhoid and the Piles
- Junk Logic
- Kim and Mark
- The Klu
- The Leapfrogs
- Lest We Forget
- The Lunatic Fringe
- **The Melbourne SS**
- Morpions
- The Nookies
- The Oroton Bags
- The Pastel Bats
- The Persons Brothers
- **People With Chairs Up Their Noses**
- The Potato Cooperative
- The Quits
- Rosehip and the Teas
- Ralf Horrors
- Ronnie and the Rhythm Boys
- Sample Only
- The Sandmen
- The Saxophone Caper
- Seaside Resort
- **Serious Young Insects**
- Sing Sing
- Shop Soiled
- **The Shower Scene From Psycho**
- Simplex
- Small Men Big Cars
- Somersaulting Consciences
- The Soporifics
- The Spanish Inquisition
- Stand by Your Guns
- The Swinging Hoy Family
- The Take
- Tarax Show
- Three Toed Sloths
- Thrush and the Cunts
- Too Fat to Fit Through the Door
- Too Many Daves
- **Use No Hooks**
- World of Sport

== See also ==
- Culture of Melbourne
- Music of Melbourne
