= All That Fall (album) =

Studio album by Beargarden
- Released: 1986
- Recorded: Albert Studios, Sydney - 1985
- Genre: New wave
- Label: Chase Records
- Producer: Bruce Brown, Russel Dunlop

Beargarden chronology
All That Fall (1986)	The Word That Refers To The Word That Refers to Walt Disney (2010)

Singles from All That Fall
- 1. "I Write the News" Released: 1985; 2. "Drink Drink Drink" Released: 1985; 3. "A Seaside Song" Released: 1986

All That Fall is the debut album by Australian new wave group Beargarden. It was released in 1986 on Chase Records.

Beargarden were selected by Virgin Records Australia as their first Australian signing. Under their new label the band released a single, "The Finer Things", which was produced by Ross Cockle at AAV studios in South Melbourne and released in October 1984 with a film clip directed by John Hillcoat and featuring a young Noah Taylor. The single however made little impact on the charts.

In July 1985, Beargarden began recording their debut album, All That Fall, at Albert Studios in Sydney with producers Bruce Brown and Russel Dunlop. A second single, "I Write the News", resulted from these sessions. The B-side, "Sixty Perfect Windows", had been recorded previously at Richmond Recorders, Melbourne, and was produced by Michael Hutchence and Andrew Farris (Hutchence provides backing vocals for the track). A film clip for "I Write The News" was directed by Paul Goldman (Australian Rules, The Night They Called It a Day, The Ben Cousins Story).

All That Fall took a great many months to complete and during this time the band's inner turmoil again boiled to the surface. Bassist Ross Farnell was replaced by Simon Polinski, and Shaun Andersen (brother of guitarist Shane Andalou) was recruited as second guitar. These changes exacerbated the band's pre-existing instability and, after the release of a third single "Drink Drink Drink"', it folded. Paul Goldman directed a clip for "Drink Drink Drink" but, given the suggestive nature of the song title and the mistaking of burning scarecrows for burning crucifixes by the producers of Countdown, it failed to air and the single made little impact.

Beargarden's disintegration was accompanied by acrimony and incidents of poor and/or outrageous behaviour on stage. Virgin quickly divested themselves of the product and All That Fall was ultimately released to little fanfare on Chase Records, accompanied by a fourth and final single "A Seaside Song". Sejavka said of the delayed release, "I'm glad it's coming out because the songs are still good and it shows part of the history of the group. Unfortunately it sounds quite dated now."

Originally appearing on vinyl, it never received an official CD release, though in 2010 became available for download, initially through Bandcamp.

== Track listing ==
1. "A Minute In Black & White" - 5:02
2. "The Tell Tale Heart" - 4:13
3. "A Year In The Shade" - 4:31
4. "I Write The News" - 4:01
5. "Drink Drink Drink" - 4:20
6. "A Seaside Song" - 4:29
7. "All That Fall" - 5:38
8. "This Time Tomorrow" - 4:48
9. "Bright Penny" - 7:05
