= Crash Politics =

Australian Band

- Origin: Sydney, Australia
- Years active: 1982–1990
- Labels: rooArt
- Past members: Stuart Paton, Andrew Reefman, Andrew Storer, Michael Wood, Ross Farnell, Andrew Steward, Peter Dolso

Crash Politics were an Australian rock group, active from 1982 to 1990. In this time, they released two studio albums.

== Career ==
Crash Politics formed in 1982 with the three original members Stuart Paton (Vocals, Guitar), Andrew Reefman (Drums) and Andrew Storer (Bass), jamming in Reefman's garage. All three lived in the northern Sydney suburbs of Belrose and Frenchs Forest. They were soon joined by fourth member Michael Wood (guitar and keyboards) and began playing in pubs around Sydney.

In 1986, the band signed with management Chris Murphy and Sebastian Chase's MMA Music and recorded their first 6 track EP A Taste of Things to Come, released on Chase Records. The EP generated two singles, "The Same" and "Sheep".

In mid 1987 the band parted ways with original bassist Andrew Storer who was replaced by Ross Farnell. At this time the band became the first group signed to Murphy's new label rooArt Records.

In 1988, the band released their debut studio album, Mother's Intention. The album generated two singles, "Stop" and "Great Smell of Freedom". A national tour to support and promote Mother's Intention lasted only one gig following a car crash in Wagga Wagga that left Farnell in hospital and with many months recovery to follow. After a hiatus the band brought in guitarist Andrew Steward to allow Paton to concentrate on vocals.

In 1989 the band went into the studio with engineer Mark Roberts and Nick Mainsbridge to self-produce the 6 track EP Tails of the Freshmen?. By this time the internal politics of Crash were fractious. Andrew Steward was replaced on guitar by Peter Dolso. rooArt returned the band to the studio to record new songs and expand the Freshman EP into a full-length album. By the time the new album Kiss My Mind was released in 1990 the band was in its final throes. Farnell had left the band to return to Melbourne, replaced for a very short time on bass by Scott Millard. Following further internal discord, Andrew Reefman and Michael Wood decided no more was to be gained by continuing, and the group disbanded later in 1990.

In 1992 Stuart Paton died in tragic circumstances.

== Discography ==
=== Albums ===
List of albums
Title	Album details
Mothers' Intention	Released: 1988; Format: CD, cassette, LP; Label: rooArt (836 1123-2)
Kiss My Mind	Released: 1990; Format: CD, cassette, LP; Label: rooArt (846 758-2)

=== Extended plays ===
List of EPs
Title	EP details
A Taste of Things to Come written by Andrew Storer	Released: 1986; Format: Cassette, LP; Label: Chase (CLP 11)
Tales of the Freshmen	Released: 1989; Format: CD, cassette, LP; Label: rooArt (876 737-2)

=== Charting singles ===
List of singles, with selected chart positions
Title	Year	Peak chart positions	Album
Title	Year	AUS	Album
"Never Too Popular"	1990	76	Kiss My Mind
