= Adam Briscomb =

Australian actor

Adam Briscomb is an Australian actor, best known for his role as Adam Tate in the television soap opera Sons and Daughters.
