= Joanne Owen =

British author

Joanne Owen is a British author, born in Neyland, Pembrokeshire, Wales.

Joanne Owen was born in Pembrokeshire, Wales, and studied anthropology, Archaeology and Social Sciences at St. John's College, Cambridge. She has worked in children's bookselling and publishing ever since. Joanne plays bass guitar and accordion in a band and lives in London.
