= Jamie Fielding (musician) =

Australian pianist, composer, and experimental musician

Jamie Fielding (1960–1993) was an Australian pianist, composer, and experimental musician.

Fielding began his music career as a jazz musician, but later became interested in electronic music, working extensively with a Yamaha DX-7 synthesiser. He performed in Michael Sheridan's Slaughter House 3 ensemble, and with various Sydney musicians, such as pianist Chris Abrahams. Fielding died in a train accident, aged 32. In 1991 Fielding had recorded the Extinkt LP, with Guy Maddison (bass, trombone), Sybilla (vocals), Peter Harvey (drums), Jon Evans (tapes), Michael Sheridan (guitar), and John Murphy (synth). The CD was released posthumously on the Dr Jims label. A triple CD overview of Fielding's music, Notes From The Underground was compiled by Michael Sheridan and Martin Jackson, and released on the Australian Independent Jazz Artist label.

Jamie Fielding, Martin Jackson and others founded the Melbourne Jazz Co-operative in late 1982 with the intention of presenting as wide a range of jazz styles as on offer in Melbourne at the time. A broad range of jazz styles were encouraged including rock-influenced, bebop, avant-garde to fusion.
