= Marie Hoy =

Australian musician and actress

- Origin: Melbourne, Australia
- Occupations: Musician; actress
- Instruments: Vocals; keyboards
- Years active: 1978–present
- Formerly of: No; Sacred Cowboys; Orchestra of Skin and Bone

Marie Hoy is an Australian musician and actress. As a vocalist and keyboardist, she was a member of Sacred Cowboys, Orchestra of Skin and Bone (1984–86), No (1987–89) and a number of bands in Melbourne's Little Band scene. As an actor, she appeared in the 1986 film Dogs in Space, where she performed the Boys Next Door's track, "Shivers". She worked with performance artist, Stelarc, on a short science fiction film, Otherzone (1998).

== Biography ==
Marie Hoy began as a musician in the Melbourne punk band, Thrush and the Cunts, in 1978. One of their tracks, "Diseases", appeared in soundtrack of the film, Dogs in Space (1986), which depicts the local little band scene from the late 1970s. She was also a member of Too Fat to Fit Through the Door, alongside Marcus Bergner, Michael Buckley, Tom Hoy, Dave Light and Stuart Grant. They issued a track, "Flintstones Meet the Flintsones", on a four-track split extended play, Little Band (1979), with one track each by Morpions, the Take, and Ronnie and the Rhythm Boys.

As an actress, Hoy appeared in the short film Incubus (1983), collaborating with Bergner and Buckley. In the same year she appeared in another short, Etrusco Me, directed by Bergner. Initially conceived as a prop for a performance by singer and musician Marie Hoy (who also appears in it), "Etrusco Me" was screened at the Melbourne International Film Festival in July–August 2009. The film juxtaposes and intermixes sculptural and linguistic elements, shifting meaning and sense, which parallels the theatrical atmospherics and ballistics later characteristically employed in the plays by the Austrian writer/artist Werner Schwab.

Hoy also appeared in Dogs in Space, as front woman of Marie Hoy and Friends, to perform the Boys Next Door's track, "Shivers". Tim Groves of Senses of Cinema observed "Nick Cave fans will appreciate a snippet of the Boys Next Door's version of their classic 'Shivers' (but pine for the rest of the clip, especially when Hoy performs the song at a gig)."

In 1984, Hoy joined post-punk band, Orchestra of Skin and Bone, on lead vocals and keyboards with Arnie Hanna on guitar, David Hoy on cello, Tom Hoy on saxophone, Lochie Kirkwood on vocals and saxophone, Ollie Olsen on lead vocals and guitar, Dugald McKenzie on vocals and autoharp, John Murphy on drums, James Rogers on trumpet and Peter Scully on guitar. They issued a self-titled album in 1985 before disbanding in the following year.

Hoy on keyboards, vocals and samples with Olsen formed another post-punk band, No, in 1987 including Kevin McMahon on bass guitar and Michael Sheridan on lead guitar. They released two albums, Glory for the Shit for Brains (1987) and Once We Were Scum, Now We Are God (1989), before disbanding in 1989.
