= Orchestra of Skin and Bone =

- Origin: Melbourne, Victoria, Australia
- Genres: Electronic; techno-dance; post punk
- Years active: 1984–1986
- Label: Major
- Past members: Arnie Hanna; David Hoy; Marie Hoy; Tom Hoy; Loki Lockwood; John Murphy; Ollie Olsen; James Rogers; Peter Scully; Dugald Mackenzie

Orchestra of Skin and Bone were an Australian post-punk band active from 1984 to 1986. The band's core members were Ollie Olsen, Marie Hoy and John Murphy.

They released a self-titled album in 1985, with the line-up of Olsen on lead vocals and guitar, Murphy on drums, Arnie Hanna on guitar, Marie Hoy on keyboards, David Hoy on cello, Tom Hoy on saxophone, Loki Lockwood on piano frames, Dugald McKenzie on vocals and harmonica, James Rogers on trumpet and Peter Scully on guitar.

They also released cassettes on underground noise labels. According to Australian musicologist, Ian McFarlane, the ensemble "proved incomprehensible to local audiences and rarely played live." Two tracks from the album, "Sometimes", and "Ot-Ven-Rot" later appeared on the album by Olsen's project with Michael Hutchence, Max Q.

== Discography ==
- Orchestra of Skin and Bone (1985) – Major Records (MRLP 003)
- Orchestra of Skin and Bone 1984–1986 (1986) – Extreme (DEX 4715) Re-released on CD (1991)
