= Dogs in Space =

1986 Australian film by Richard Lowenstein

- Original theatrical poster
- Directed by: Richard Lowenstein
- Written by: Richard Lowenstein
- Produced by: Glenys Rowe
- Starring: Michael Hutchence; Saskia Post; Nique Needles; Chris Haywood; Deanna Bond; Tony Helou; Laura Swanson; Emma de Clario
- Cinematography: Andrew de Groot
- Edited by: Jill Bilcock
- Music by: Ollie Olsen; Michael Hutchence
- Distributed by: Hoyts
- Release date: 18 December 1986
- Running time: 103 minutes
- Country: Australia
- Language: English
- Budget: AU$2 million—$3 million
- Box office: AU$367,351

Dogs in Space is a 1986 Australian drama film set in Melbourne's "Little Band" post-punk music scene in 1978. Written and directed by Richard Lowenstein, the film stars Michael Hutchence as the drug-addled frontman of the fictitious band from which the film takes its name.

== Plot ==
Dogs in Space centres on a group of young music fans sharing a house in the inner Melbourne suburb of Richmond. Sam (Michael Hutchence) and Tim (Nique Needles) are the key members of a band called Dogs in Space, and share a house with a variety of social misfits, including Sam's girlfriend Anna (Saskia Post), a university student called Luchio (Tony Helou) and a transient and apparently nameless teenager known only as The Girl (Deanna Bond).

The film's minimal plot traces the day-to-day existence of the characters, particularly the relationship between Sam and Anna, and is largely made up of a sequence of party scenes involving live music and drug use. In between, there are trips to Ballarat (at the time, the closest town to Melbourne with a 24-hour convenience store) and humorous encounters with an aggressive neighbour (Joe Camilleri) and one character's fast-talking, chainsaw-wielding uncle (Chris Haywood), who simply turns up one afternoon with his family (the baby in this scene is Lowenstein's niece Robyn). There is also a minor incident in which the characters burn some rubbish in a plan to claim it as a piece of Skylab for a local radio station. In the end, the group's dysfunctional and hedonistic lifestyle claims a victim when Anna dies from a heroin overdose. Footage of Sputnik 2 is intercut with the narrative, focused largely on Laika (the first dog in space), and can also be seen on television in the background of several scenes.

== Cast ==
- Michael Hutchence as Sam
- Saskia Post as Anna
- Nique Needles as Tim
- Deanna Bond as The Girl
- Tony Helou as Luchio
- Chris Haywood as Chainsaw Man
- Peter Walsh as Anthony
- Laura Swanson as Clare
- Hugo Race as Pierre
- Alannah Hill as Anna's girlfriend
- Edward Clayton-Jones as Nick
- Noah Taylor as Bowie fan
- Adam Briscomb as Grant
- Michele Bennett as Grant's girl (as Michelle Bennett)
- Lian Lunson as Grant's girl

== Production ==
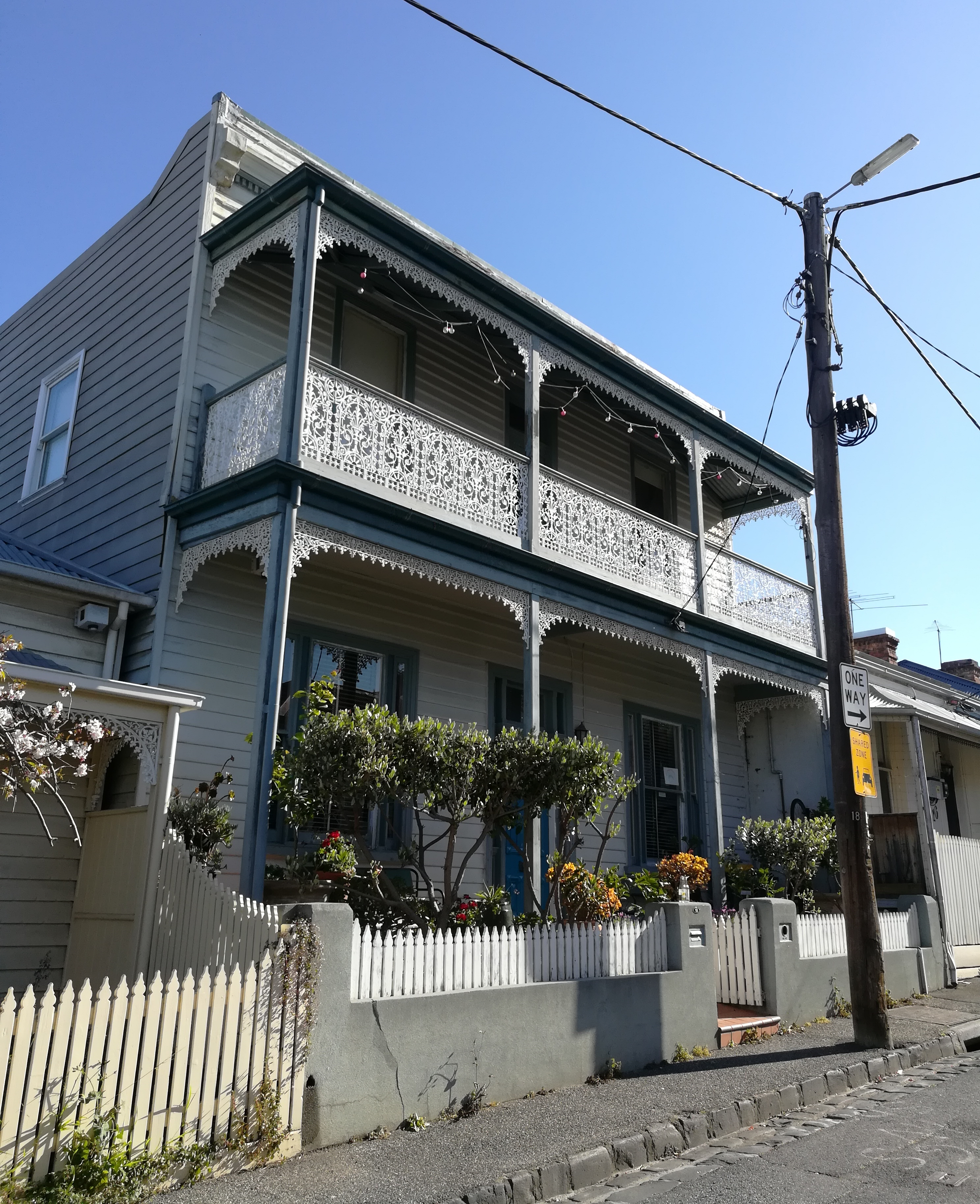
The Victorian era weatherboard terrace at Berry Street, Richmond, otherwise known as the "Dogs in Space house".

The script was based on Lowenstein's personal experiences of living in a shared house in Melbourne in the late '70s. Prior to making the film, Lowenstein had made a series of promotional clips for songs from the INXS album The Swing and wrote the lead role with singer Michael Hutchence in mind. Funds were raised through the Burrowes Group. The production company was Central Park Films Pty Ltd (Lowenstein's production company)

The central character Sam is based on Sam Sejavka from the band The Ears, with whom Lowenstein lived in the 1970s. Chuck Meo, who plays a drummer in the movie, also lived with the pair. The house, at 18 Berry Street, Richmond, was the same house Lowenstein and Sejavka shared and was rented from its new owners and modified at considerable expense for the film. The Heritage Victoria listed Pelaco Sign appears in scenes throughout the film. Lowenstein wrote himself out of the film and several of his exploits were attributed to the character Tim (Nique Needles). Sejavka has a brief cameo in a party scene as a character called Michael. Sejavka was upset by the fictionalisation of parts of his life, saying, "Even though it's an interesting time that should be documented, I find it hard to believe Richard could do this to his friends. It's just Richard's version of what happened. It's not the correct version."

== Music ==
The soundtrack was released on Chase Records in February 1987 (CLPX14), featuring several tracks from reformed "little bands" and other contemporary tracks of the time.

The album came in two versions: a censored version in a white sleeve with the band name "Thrush & the Cunts" bowdlerised to "Thrush and the C**ts" and possibly-offensive song vocal tracks removed, and an "R"-rated version in a black sleeve with all band names in full, movie dialogue between the songs, and all vocal tracks in full. The album's liner notes were written by Clinton Walker.

Chase Records went out of business soon after and, despite much effort, the record has never been reissued and has remained unavailable since. It is now a collector's item, commanding high prices. It was only available on LP and cassette and was issued on CD – at least the censored version appeared on discount bins in shopping malls in Lisbon, Portugal, somewhere around 1996–1997.

The Hutchence tracks were his second official solo recordings, after releasing a single in 1982 titled "Speed Kills" from the soundtrack to the film Freedom, and his first with Ollie Olsen. They would later collaborate on the Max Q recordings.

Side One:

1. "Dog Food" (Iggy Pop)
2. "Dogs in Space" (Michael Hutchence)
3. "Win/Lose" (Ollie Olsen)
4. "Anthrax" (Gang of Four)
5. "Skysaw" (Brian Eno)
6. "True Love" (Marching Girls)
7. "Shivers" (Boys Next Door)

Side Two:

1. "Diseases" (Thrush & the Cunts)
2. "Pumping Ugly Muscle" (The Primitive Calculators)
3. "Golf Course" (Hutchence)
4. "The Green Dragon" (Hutchence)
5. "Shivers" (Marie Hoy and friends)
6. "Endless Sea" (Iggy Pop)
7. "Rooms for the Memory" (Hutchence)

Charts

Chart (1987)	Peak position
Australia (Kent Music Report)	46

== Release ==
=== Box office ===
Dogs in Space grossed $367,351 at the box office in Australia. The movie's box-office prospects were negatively affected by an R rating by the OFLC. It was re-classified MA15+ for subsequent DVD and Blu-ray releases.

=== Home media ===
Dogs in Space was released on DVD by Umbrella Entertainment in September 2009. The DVD is compatible with all region codes and includes special features such as the original theatrical and Director's cut trailers, various audio commentaries, a featurette titled We're Livin' on Dog Food, a making-of, rehearsal vision, a screen test, behind the scenes, still galleries, interviews, and short films.

In March 2010, Umbrella Entertainment released the film on Blu-ray.

== See also ==
- Melbourne in film
- Cinema of Australia
- List of Australian films
