= Paula Jones (audio engineer) =

Australian audio engineer

Paula Jones is an Australian audio engineer who has worked with Elton John, Michael Hutchence, and Marcella Detroit. In 1990, she was nominated for the ARIA (Australian Record Industry Association) Australian Engineer Of The Year for her work engineering/mixing the Max Q album with Michael Hutchence. She engineered "Can You Feel The Love Tonight" which went on to win an Academy Award for Best Original Song.

== Early life ==
Jones grew up in Sydney. She became interested in learning sound when she was 15 and dating a guitarist in a local cover band. She started asking questions to the engineers at every gig.

== Professional career ==
Jones started her career at Sydney's Rhinoceros Recording Studios where she worked with producers and artists including Chris Thomas, David Nicholas and INXS. She was asked to go to London to assist on a mix Air Studios when she was 22.

In London, she continued working with Chris Thomas engineering for artists such as Elton John and with producers Dave Stewart (Eurythmics) and Martin Chambers (The Pretenders). She has worked out of world class studios including AIR Lyndhurst, Olympic, The Townhouse and SARM West. The success of the Lion King soundtrack prompted her to move to Los Angeles.

While living in Los Angeles she partnered with Tony Brock to remix Korn and 311, Rick Rubin for a Puff Daddy remix and she produced and co wrote with Marcella Detroit. Jones programmed beats and engineered projects for song writers Rick Nowels and Billy Steinberg. She has also worked with Charlie Clouser on projects with Rob Zombie and others.

Credits include -

- Elton John - "Circle Of Life" - engineer
- In The Dark - indie horror film score composition
- Tyler Conti - debut album - engineer

== Personal life ==
She has one child and resides in Australia.
