= John Murphy (musician) =

Australian musician

- Also known as: John Smith from the Suburbs; Jonh Murphy; Shining Vril
- Born: John Russell Murphy; 11 July 1959; Melbourne, Victoria, Australia
- Died: 11 October 2015 (aged 56) Berlin, Germany
- Genres: Post-punk; ambient; industrial
- Occupation: Musician
- Instruments: Drums; percussion
- Years active: 1977–2015
- Formerly of: News; Whirlywirld; The Associates; Orchestra of Skin and Bone; No; Max Q; Whitehouse; Death in June; Browning Mummery; Naevus

John Russell Murphy (11 July 1959 – 11 October 2015) was an Australian drummer, percussionist and multi-instrumental session musician who played in Australian and British post-punk, ambient and industrial music groups.

== Early life ==
John Russell Murphy was born on 11 July 1959 and raised in Melbourne, Victoria. His father, Russ Murphy, was a jazz drummer who played for many years with the Graeme Bell All Stars, John started learning drums and percussion from the age of 4. For secondary schooling he attended Scotch College, where he played in the school orchestra and in military and Scottish pipe bands.

== Career ==
John Murphy, as John Smith from the Suburbs, was the founding drummer in 1977 of punk band, News, with Adam Punk (real name Gavin Quinn) on vocals, Jarryl Circus (real name Jarryl Wirth) on guitar and Joy Relentless (real name Julie Jordan) on bass guitar. Jordan, Quinn and Wirth were all former members of Babeez. News' debut single, "Dirty Lies", was released in May 1978. In the following year they issued "Dowanna Love" and then "Sweet Dancer".

By May 1979, Murphy had left News and joined Whirlywirld, fronted by Ollie Olsen on lead vocals. Along with fellow Melbourne group Primitive Calculators, Whirlywirld was instrumental in fostering the experimental Little Band scene, of which Murphy was an active participant. Murphy served as an advisor for, and appeared in, director Richard Lowenstein's dramatisation of the scene, the 1986 film Dogs in Space. In 1980 Murphy and Olsen travelled to London and formed Hugo Klang, which issued a single, "Grand Life for Fools and Idiots", in 1982. They followed with "The Wheel of Fat". Murphy returned to Australia in 1984 where he continued to work with Olsen until the early 1990s in various post-punk bands: Orchestra of Skin and Bone (1984–86), No (1987–89), and Max Q (1989–90).

Murphy worked with the following acts: the Associates (1980–81), Dumb and the Ugly, Harpoon (1995–97) Sooterkin Flesh, the Slub, SPK, Lustmord, Our Father of Serpents, Stress, Jaundiced Eye, the Wreckery (1988), Box the Jesuit (1990), Bushpig (1992), Whitehouse, Death in June, Der Blutharsch, Sword Volcano Complex, Browning Mummery, Current 93, Blood Axis, Kraang, Sleeping Pictures, Scorpion Wind, Naevus, Nikolas Schreck, NON and Of the Wand & the Moon, in addition to playing on sessions for Nico, Zeena Schreck, the The, Gene Loves Jezebel and Shriekback.

He recorded solo under the name Shining Vril, and as part of the industrial electronic trio Knifeladder, and as a member of the folk-noise group Foresta Di Ferro, and as part of the industrial music trio Last Dominion Lost.

Murphy died from an illness in Berlin, at the age of 56.

== Tributes ==
After his death, the Epicurean record label produced a lavishly printed, three-CD box set compilation of various musical artists who performed with Murphy throughout his life, from the very earliest years up until his end months. The extensive memorial tribute, All My Sins Remembered – The Sonic Worlds of John Murphy is a collaborative effort of many musicians to help raise financial support for Murphy's widow to offset the medical and funeral expenses incurred.
