= Max Q (Australian band) =

Australian band

- Origin: Melbourne, Victoria, Australia
- Genres: Synth-pop; pop rock; electronic
- Years active: 1989–1990
- Labels: Atlantic; CBS; Mercury
- Past members: Michael Hutchence; Ollie Olsen; Arne Hanna; Michael Sheridan; Bill McDonald; Gus Till; John Murphy

Max Q were a short-lived Australian band formed in 1989. Playing electronic music, the band was a collaboration between Michael Hutchence of INXS and Ollie Olsen (Whirlywirld, Dogs in Space soundtrack).

== Biography ==
Max Q consisted of Hutchence (vocals and songwriting) and Olsen (songwriting and production), who were accompanied by key members of the post-punk scene in Melbourne, Australia; most of whom had previously collaborated with Olsen. The project followed on from Hutchence and Olsen's work on the film Dogs in Space, where they had first met.

Max Q released its sole self-titled album in 1989 and had minor hits with the songs "Way of the World" and "Sometimes". The album was certified gold in Australia, and was the 93rd highest-selling album of 1989 in Australia. Max Q was less successful in other countries. The album is no longer in print and has never been re-issued. The band never performed any live shows.

In 2019, INXS' manager Chris Murphy said he would love to reissue the Max Q album, but that legal issues were not yet resolved.

== Name ==
While the project was named after Ollie Olsen's dog Max, max q is also an aerospace term referring to the point at which the dynamic pressure (q) on a launch vehicle is greatest. Consequently, there is another band called Max Q, which consists of astronauts assigned to the Johnson Space Center in Houston, Texas.

== Band members ==
In a 1989 interview, Hutchence revealed his perspective on the Max Q musicians:

Ollie isn't supposed to hang around with pop stars and I'm not supposed to hang around with punk types. The band is made up of rowdy friends from Melbourne. These guys are good musicians who've never had a chance. Most of them have never even been in a studio. These are real underground people who don't have any money. Some of them have never been on a plane before. They were worried that working with me, they'd lose their underground status.

Contrary to Hutchence's statement, all of the members of Max Q had previously made studio recordings.

- Michael Hutchence – vocals, songwriting (died 1997)
- Ollie Olsen – production, songwriting (died 2024)
- Arne Hanna – guitar
- Michael Sheridan – guitar, feedback
- Bill McDonald – bass guitar
- Gus Till – piano, MIDI programming
- John Murphy – drums, percussion, trumpet, screams (died 2015)

Additional musicians

- Peggy Harley – backing vocals
- Marie Hoy – backing vocals ("Soul Engine")
- Pat Powell – backing vocals ("Bucket Head")
- Pam Ross – narration
- Recorded at Rhino Studios, Darlinghurst
- Paula (Peej) Jones – engineer

== Discography ==
=== Albums ===
Title	Details	Peak positions				Certifications (thresholds)
Title	Details	AUS	NZ	UK	US	Certifications (thresholds)
Max Q	Released: September 1989; Label: CBS; Format: CD, cassette, LP	13	27	69	182	ARIA: Gold

=== Singles ===
Title	Year	Chart positions					Album
Title	Year	AUS	NZ	UK	US Dance	US Mod. Rock	Album
"Way of the World"	1989	8	5	87	44	6	Max Q
"Sometimes"	1989	31	37	53	—	—	Max Q
"Monday Night by Satellite"	1990	107	—	—	—	—	Max Q

== ARIA Awards ==
Year	Nominee / work	Award	Result
1990	"Way of the World"	Breakthrough Artist – Single	Nominated
1990	"Way of the World"	Single of the Year	Nominated
1990	Max Q	Breakthrough Artist – Album	Nominated
