= Ollie Olsen =

Australian musician, composer and sound designer (1958–2024)

- Olsen in c. 1980s

Background information
- Also known as: Ollie Olsen; Ollie Jngbert Christian Olsen
- Born: Ian Christopher Olsen; 20 February 1958; Melbourne, Victoria, Australia
- Died: 16 October 2024 (aged 66) Melbourne, Victoria, Australia
- Genres: Post-punk; electronica; techno; dance; avant-garde
- Occupations: Musician; composer; sound designer
- Instruments: Synthesizers; vocals; guitar; saxophone; clarinet; violin; percussion
- Years active: 1977–2019; 2020–2024
- Labels: Mushroom Music; Psy-Harmonics; Universal
- Formerly of: Orchestra of Skin and Bone; Whirlywirld; No; Max Q; Taipan Tiger Girls
- Spouse: Jayne Olsen (m. 2024)

Ollie Jngbert Christian Olsen (born Ian Christopher Olsen, 20 February 1958 – 16 October 2024) was an Australian multi-instrumentalist, composer, sound designer and pioneer of electronic music in the Southern Hemisphere. From the mid-1970s until his later years, he performed, recorded and produced electronic, rock and experimental music. His post-punk groups included Whirlywirld (1978–80), Orchestra of Skin and Bone (1984–86) and No (1987–89). Olsen joined with Michael Hutchence (of INXS) to form a short-term band, Max Q, which issued an album in 1989. He co-founded the alternative electronic music record label Psy-Harmonics with Bruce Butler in 1993, and later continued with Andrew Till. In 2014 he formed Taipan Tiger Girls.

== Biography ==
Ollie Jngbert Christian Olsen (born Ian Christopher Olsen) was born in 1958 in Melbourne. He grew up with a sibling in suburban Blackburn, and when he was 11 years old the family spent four months in Norway in mid-1969.

Olsen developed an interest in electronic music as a teenager in the mid-1970s, studying with Felix Werder. Olsen issued a range of work from experimental to film and television soundtracks, pop and dance music, installation projects and established record labels. According to Australian musicologist Ian McFarlane, he is "recognised as one of the key figures in the Australian post-punk electronic movement of the late 1970s. Ever the experimentalist, Olsen's eclectic career in avant-garde rock took him from the Reals, one of the original Melbourne punk combos of the late 1970s, through to the acid-house/techno/trance outfit Third Eye. He was also the driving force behind the Psy-Harmonics label."

=== Melbourne in the 1970s and 1980s ===
In the late 1970s, Olsen formed two punk/post-punk bands, as leader and vocalist, as well as being a key figure in the Melbourne little band scene. His punk bands included the Reals and the Young Charlatans. Aside from Olsen on guitar, the Reals' line-up was Peter Cave on drums, Gary Gray on lead vocals and Chris Walsh on bass guitar. At the end of 1977, he formed the Young Charlatans with Janine Hall on bass guitar, Rowland S. Howard on guitar (ex-Obsessions) and Jeffrey Wegener on drums (ex-Saints). Australian music journalist Clinton Walker described this band as having "inner-city 'supergroup' status from the outset and helped pioneer post-punk rock in Australia."

Howard had written his iconic song "Shivers" while with the Young Charlatans, it was later recorded and released by a group Howard joined soon afterwards, The Boys Next Door. Young Charlatans recorded the first (and second) version of "Shivers" as part of their unreleased demos, which were made by Bruce Milne for a future single on his Au Go Go Records label.

The Young Charlatans broke up in May 1978 and Olsen, on lead vocals, synthesiser, clarinet and saxophone, formed Whirlywirld, with Andrew Duffield on synthesiser, John Murphy on drums (ex-the News), Dean Richards on guitar and Simon Smith on synthesiser. Their debut self-titled three-track extended play was released in June 1979 via Missing Link Records. Olsen wrote two tracks and co-wrote the third with Murphy. The group issued a second self-titled EP in February 1980. The first 500 copies also included a bonus single, "Sextronics", but Whirlywirld disbanded before it appeared.

Olsen and Murphy relocated to the United Kingdom in early 1980 on the recommendation of Iggy Pop. The Canberra Times' Jonathan Green reported that "The Ig was impressed with the band's first EP when out here last year". The duo formed the Beast Apparel, which later became Hugo Klang, and released a single, "Grand Life for Fools and Idiots", in 1982. Olsen returned to Australia in the following year and continued Hugo Klang with Alan Bamford, Tom Hoy and Laughton Ellery, before this group split up in 1983.

In 1984 Olsen on vocals and guitar, Marie Hoy on keyboards and vocals and Murphy as drummer formed "an avant-garde outfit", Orchestra of Skin and Bone. Marie Hoy had been an instigator of the Melbourne 'little bands' scene, as a member of Too Fat to Fit Through the Door and others. Other musicians associated with Orchestra of Skin and Bone included David Hoy on cello, Tom Hoy on saxophone, Lochie Kirkwood on vocals and saxophone, Dugald McKenzie on vocals and harmonica, James Rogers on trumpet and Peter Scully on guitar. They issued a self-titled album in 1986 and disbanded soon afterwards. The following year, Ollie formed No, with Olsen on keyboards, vocals, drum machine and sampler, Marie Hoy on keyboards, vocals and samples alongside Kevin McMahon on bass guitar and Michael Sheridan on guitar in 1987.

=== Dogs in Space to Max Q ===
Film director Richard Lowenstein asked Olsen to appear in and work as music director for his feature film Dogs in Space (December 1986). Olsen supervised the reforming of acts from the late 1970s little band scene and produced music recordings for the soundtrack. He re-recorded material by Whirlywirld including two singles, "Win/Lose" (April 1987) as a solo effort, and "Rooms for the Memory" (February) by the film's star, Michael Hutchence (of INXS). The film also featured Marie Hoy singing "Shivers". In a 2009 interview, following the restoration of the original film for a DVD release, Lowenstein told Trevor Block:

But Whirlywirld were always the ones for me. I mean, their music is in the movie itself, over the end credits. And the great thing about Ollie [Olsen], and one of the reasons I asked him to do so much in the movie, is that his songs have always had a feel to them, a kind of mood that fitted in with what we were doing. You'd die to make a video for some of his songs, he uses so many great images, and the rhythms he uses are amazing as well.

In 1989 Olsen and Hutchence collaborated on a musical project, Max Q, co-producing a self-titled album combining electronic music with orchestra, bass, guitar and backing vocals. The Max Q band included Arne Hanna (guitar), Bill McDonald (bass), John Murphy (drums, percussion), Michael Sheridan (guitar) and Gus Till (keyboards). After recording Olsen and Hutchence travelled to New York City to mix the tracks with DJ Todd Terry.

Max Q is featured in the 2019 film Mystify by Richard Lowenstein.

=== 1990s onwards ===
Olsen returned to Australia and turned his attentions to trance music, co-founding an Australian electronic music label, Psy-Harmonics, with Gus Till's brother, Andrew Till, and recording under the name Third Eye. From the 1990s onwards, he worked increasingly in sound design and scores for film and scores for television.

Olsen lectured on and taught electronic music at various universities and symposia, and he also performed with a wide variety of international artists.

As of 2006, Olsen was working on a number of recording projects—mostly electro-acoustic pieces—with artists from Australia, Japan and South Africa, for performance and release in 2006. Olsen's musical output that year consisted of the release of an album, I Am The Server (13 February 2006), through the Greek record label Creative Space, and the release of an electro-acoustic album entitled Simulated. I Am The Server was composed, recorded and engineered by Olsen, with additional music from Bill McDonald and Peter Luscombe; the album was mastered by Simon Pool at LGM studios, and the album artwork was produced by Maro Kassoti. Simulated was composed, performed and engineered by Olsen, between 1999 and 2006, mastered by Simon Pool at LGM studios, in January 2006, and the album artwork was, again, produced by Maro Kassoti.

In January 2019, Olsen announced his retirement from music via Facebook. In May 2020, Olsen announced publicly online on making a return to music and the release of the Whirlywirld Complete Discography 1978-80 LP on HoZac Records due out in June 2020.

In 2020, Olsen was diagnosed with multiple system atrophy (MSA). In January 2023 music journalist Jane Gazzo, singer Adalita and producer Nick Launay re-recorded Olsen's 1978 composition "Rooms for the Memory"—originally a top-20 solo single for Hutchence in 1986 and also used in the associated film Dogs in Space. Olsen's MSA was announced in June 2023 and the new rendition featuring Mick Harvey, Andrew Duffield and Mat Watson (Taipan Tiger Girls) was due for release in July with proceeds in support of his ongoing medical expenses. In June 2023, it was reported by Greg Phillips of Australian Musician, that Olsen's condition "continues to deteriorate as there is currently no known cure."

In early October 2024, it was announced that Olsen would be inducted into the Music Victoria Hall of Fame on 24 October 2024.

Olsen married his long-term partner and carer, Jayne Olsen, on 9 October 2024.

Olsen died on 16 October 2024, at the age of 66.

== List of past bands ==
Credits:

- The Reals (1977): guitar
- The Young Charlatans (1977–78)
- Whirlywirld (1978–80): lead vocals, synthesiser, saxophone
- The Beast Apparel / Hugo Klang (1981–83)
- Lion Feed
- Orchestra of Skin and Bone (1984–86): vocals, guitar
- NO (1987–89): keyboards, vocals, sampler
- Max Q (1989–90)
- Third Eye
- The Visitors
- Shaolin Wooden Men
- Psyko Disko
- Antediluvian Rocking Horse
- I Am The Server
- Primitive Ghost
- Taipan Tiger Girls
- Spectral Electron Chromas
- Kitty Chrome
- Vanish from this state of Whatever

== Collaborations and projects ==
- Nominated for Best Original Music Score for the movie Head On at the Australian Film Institute Awards (AFI Awards, 1998)
- "Regenerative Generative Generative" psychedelic (re)constructions (real-time interactive sound and image) and translations of sound into visual responses. The culmination of a series of interactive and generative compositions explored over the past two decades by Andrew Garton, Ollie Olsen and John Power. Australian Centre for Contemporary Art, Melbourne, 2000 This is Not Art Festival, Newcastle, NSW, 2000
- "From Drift to Derive" Multi-screen video, 5.1 generative sound by Andrew Garton and Ollie Olsen Australian Centre for the Moving Image, Melbourne, 2003 Small Black Box, Institute for Modern Art, Brisbane, Australia, 2003
- Composed score for "The Loved Ones" 2009
- Composed score for "Birthday" 2009
- Released debut album with Taipan Tiger Girls – 2015

== Psy-Harmonics record label ==
In 1993, Olsen formed Psy-Harmonics, an independent record label, with Andrew Till, which specialised in electronic music.
