= Rex Mossop =

Australia dual-code rugby international footballer

- Born: Rex Peers Mossop; 18 February 1928 Five Dock, New South Wales, Australia
- Died: 17 June 2011 (aged 83) St Leonards, New South Wales, Australia
- Occupation: Television commentator

Rugby union career
- Position: Lock
Amateur team(s)
Years	Team	Apps	(Points)
1947-51	Manly RUFC		
International career
Years	Team	Apps	(Points)
1948-51	Australia	8	
- Rugby league career

Playing information
- Position: Prop, Second-row
Club
Years	Team	Pld	T	G	FG	P
1951–54	Leigh	98	16	0	0	48
1956–63	Manly-Warringah	129	11	0	0	33
	Total	227	27	0	0	81
Representative
Years	Team	Pld	T	G	FG	P
1957–60	New South Wales	8	0	0	0	0
1958–60	Australia	3	0	0	0	0
1957–60	NSW City	2	0	0	0	0

Rex Peers "Moose" Mossop (18 February 1928 – 17 June 2011) was an Australian rugby union and rugby league footballer who played in the 1940s, 1950s and 1960s – a dual-code international, and an Australian television personality from 1964 until 1991.

== Rugby union career ==
Mossop played rugby union for the Manly club and played eight tests for the Wallabies from 1948 to 1951. His international rugby union career was played at lock. In 1950 he was chosen in the All-Australian team for that season selected by the magazine Sporting Life.

== Rugby league career ==
Switching to rugby league in England in 1951, he played with Championship side Leigh. He returned to Australia and Sydney's Northern Beaches in 1956, joining the Manly-Warringah Sea Eagles who played in the New South Wales Rugby League Premiership and became the cornerstone of their forward pack in the late 1950s.

Ever an aggressive front-row forward, Mossop played in the Manly sides that lost to the St George Dragons in grand finals in 1957 and 1959. In the lead up to the 1959 Grand Final, rumours were circulating that Mossop was carrying a broken cheekbone. From the kick off, Saints' forwards took turns at testing Mossop's injury with opposing prop Harry Bath giving him particular attention. For most of the match the Manly forward copped a hammering until in frustration, Mossop retaliated by standing on Bath's head. A brawl broke out between the two and the referee Darcy Lawler sent both off. Mossop later recalled how after both he and Bath had left the league judiciary the following week, that they got talking and both got a laugh about being told off like naughty school boys. A mutual respect for each other had developed into what would be a lifelong friendship between the pair.

Notwithstanding his uncompromising playing style, Mossop won a newspaper's "best and fairest" award for the 1958 season.

He first represented Australia in rugby league at age 30 in 1958 in the first Test against the touring Great Britain side at the Sydney Cricket Ground, an appearance in which he became Australia's 25th dual code rugby international, following Ken Kearney (a teammate that day playing hooker) and preceding Arthur Summons. He scored a try on début as the Australian's defeated the tourists 25–8. Mossop then played in the remaining Ashes Tests though the Lions would go on to win the remaining games and the series 2–1. He then toured with the Kangaroos to Great Britain in 1959-60 as vice-captain. Mossop played a total of nine Tests for Australia.

In 1959, Mossop played in the New South Wales loss to Queensland that attracted 35,261 spectators to the Brisbane Exhibition Ground, smashing Brisbane's previous record for an interstate match of 22,817. Queensland won the game 17–15.

He played 136 games for Manly, retiring in 1963 at age 35.

Rex Mossop is listed on the Australian Rugby League Players Register as Kangaroo No. 336.

== Commentator ==
As was normal for professional rugby league players of the time, Mossop had a full-time job: as a car salesman for one of Sydney's largest car dealers, Stacks Holden. In 1963, he heard that Channel 7 were advertising for a sports director. Despite not having any television or broadcasting experience, Mossop won the position over sixty applicants for the job, many of whom possessed better television credentials than he did.

Mossop first appeared on air in 1964 and called his first game in 1965, only four years after former player Ray Stehr had carried out the first ever commercial telecast on Channel 9 in 1961. He spent 20 years as host of a rugby league preview show including the Controversy Corner discussion segment. From the early 1970s till 1990 on Sydney channels Seven and then Ten he was the voice of rugby league and the pre-eminent TV match broadcast caller. His criticism of players and referees was blunt and uncompromising and his calling style was seen by opposing fans as parochially favouring Manly. His match commentaries and indeed his other forays into the public domain were often filled with tautological descriptors that in eastern state Australian vernacular became known as "Mossopisms": These mistakes also led to his nickname, "Rox Messup".

- "if I keep getting Boyd and O'Grady mixed up, it's because they look alike, especially around the head"
- "tiny, diminutive, little Mark Shulman"
- "he seems to be favouring a groin injury at the top of his leg"
- "now the referee's giving him a verbal tongue lashing"
- "I don't think the male genitals or the female genitals should be rammed down people's throats … to use a colloquialism."
- "He's made a great yardage of 25 metres."
- "There's too many backs in the three quarter line".
- "He's making good forward progress".

He also recorded such classics as:

- "Son of a very famous father"
- "A little bit marginal"
- "Very mobile running"

The perceived parochialism towards Manly - and a gruff style that bordered on arrogance - often alienated him with league supporters, so much so that he was once famously hit in the side of the head with a piece of fruit thrown at him while giving a live post-match summary. With his long association with Channel 7 many celebrities and media still refer to ATN Channel 7 as Channel REX.

As a commentator, Mossop also covered the 1978, 1982 and 1986 Kangaroo Tours for Australian television. Never one to hold back his comments, when describing the Australians 34-4 demolition of Great Britain in the second test at Elland Road in Leeds during the undefeated 1986 tour, Mossop said as Brett Kenny crossed for the Kangaroos 6th try (pushing the score at that stage to 32-0) "Australia carved them up. They've decimated, dissected and absolutely diabolically destroyed this Great Britain side today"'.

Through his work with Channel 7 during the 1960s, Mossop also became a commentator at the Sydney Showground Speedway during the summer months. He would also commentate on other speedway events during his career including working with ATN's motorsports director and Liverpool City Raceway promoter Mike Raymond on televised events from Liverpool such as the 1982 Speedway World Pairs Championship Final.

== Other television work ==
From 1970 to 1971, Mossop was the "Beast" on the television talk show Beauty and the Beast.

From 1991 to 1995, he was a regular panel member on Andrew Denton's sport-themed comedy talk show, Live and Sweaty, on the ABC alongside others including actor Lex "The Swine" Marinos, former Australian rules footballer Peter "Crackers" Keenan, Karen Tighe, Debbie "Skull of Rust" Spillane and Elle McFeast (Libbi Gorr).

He made an appearance on Tonight Live with Steve Vizard in 1992 alongside openly gay comedian Julian Clary in which Mossop refused to shake Clary's hand and espoused homophobic opinions towards Clary.

== Honours ==
Mossop became a life member of the New South Wales Rugby League (NSWRL) in 1999 in recognition of services to the game.

In 2006, Mossop was named in both the Manly Rugby League and Manly Rugby Union "best ever" sides, highlighting his enormous contribution to both codes.

Rex Mossop was awarded the Australian Sports Medal on 24 October 2000 for services to Rugby League.

== Personal ==
Mossop was the younger son of Norman Mossop, a World War I veteran of English descent who had been wounded in battle at Passchendale, and Nellie Mossop (née Kirkpatrick) who was of Scottish descent. Born in Five Dock, New South Wales, he had an elder brother, Kirk, who later became a noted artist. The family lived in Five Dock but moved to Balgowlah by the time he was five. He attended Manly Boys High School, leaving in 1943 to become initially an apprentice fitter and turner, and later a sales representative for a variety of businesses prior to his career in television.

Mossop married Joan Mildred Bell on 26 October 1951 at St Matthew's Church, Manly. The couple had two sons, Kirk (1952) and Gregory (1956).

In 1976, Mossop made a citizen's arrest of a nudist at Balgowlah Beach later stating "I don't need the male genitalia rammed down my throat".

In his final years, Mossop suffered from Alzheimer's disease. He died aged 83 on 17 June 2011 at the Royal North Shore Hospital in Sydney surrounded by family and friends. His funeral was held on 24 June 2011 at St Matthew's Church, Manly.

As a mark of respect for Mossop, the Manly Warringah Sea Eagles players wore black armbands for their round 15 clash with traditional rivals Parramatta on 20 June 2011 at Manly's home ground, Brookvale Oval, and a minute's silence was observed before kick off.
