= Dave Graney =

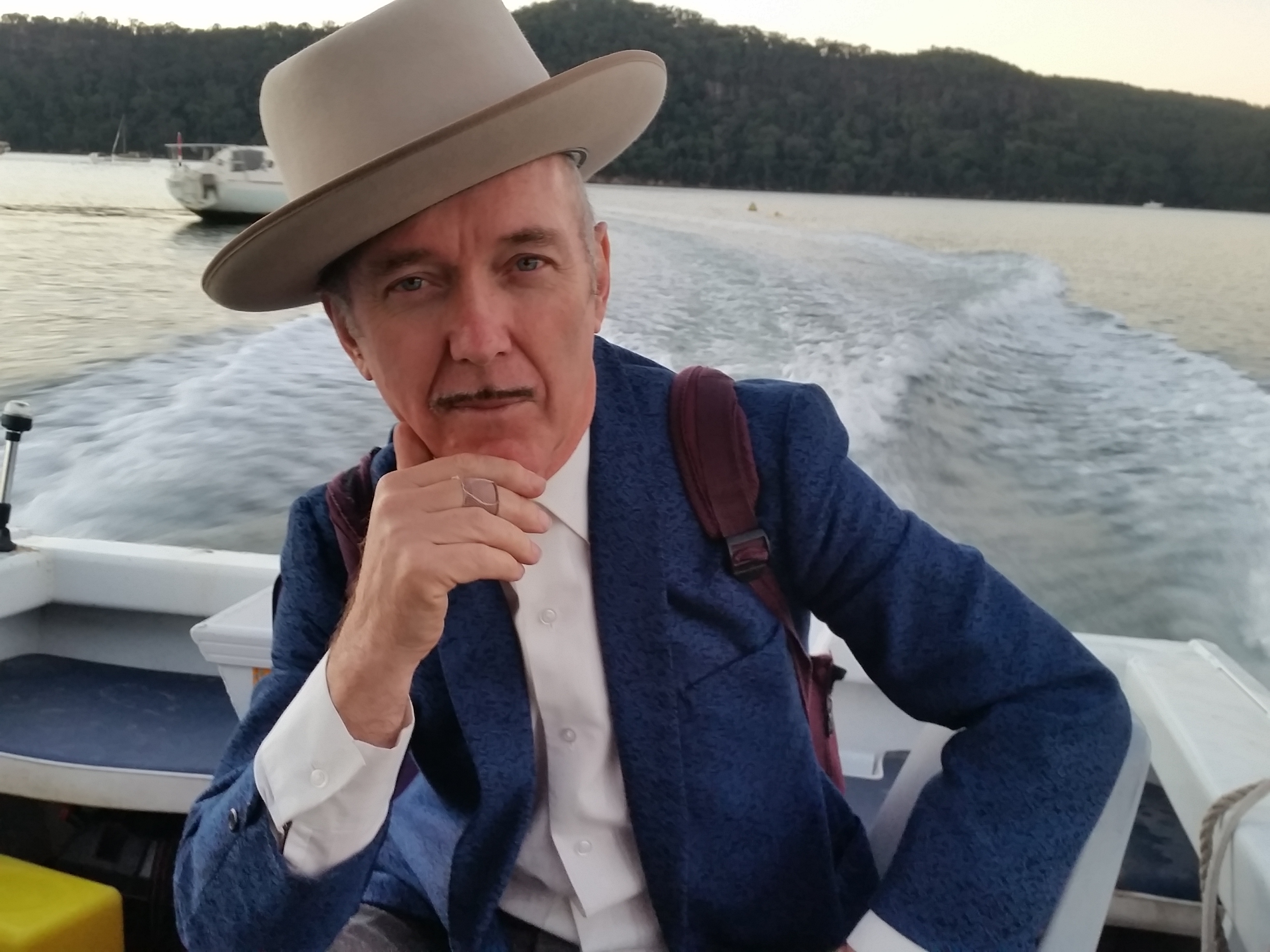
- Graney in 2019

Background information
- Born: David John Graney; 1959 (age 66–67); Mount Gambier, South Australia, Australia
- Genres: Rock, pop
- Occupations: Musician, songwriter, composer, author
- Instruments: Guitar, vocals
- Years active: 1978–present
- Labels: Red Flame, Creation, TIM, Fire, Torn & Frayed, Id, Mercury, Universal, Festival, Liberation, COCKAIGNE
- Website: davegraney.com

David John Graney (born 1959) is an Australian rock musician, singer-songwriter and author. Since 1978, Graney has collaborated with drummer-multi instrumentalist Clare Moore. The pair have fronted or been involved with numerous bands including The Moodists (1980 to 1987), Dave Graney and the White Buffaloes (1989 to 1990), Dave Graney and the Coral Snakes (1987 to 1989, 1991 to 1997), The Dave Graney Show (1998 to 2003), Dave Graney and Clare Moore featuring The Lurid Yellow Mist or Dave Graney and The Lurid Yellow Mist (2004 to 2011) and Dave Graney and The mistLY. Many albums since Let's Get Tight in 2017 have been credited to Dave Graney and Clare Moore.

Graney was awarded the ARIA Award for Best Male Artist at the 1996 ARIA Music Awards for his work on The Soft 'n' Sexy Sound, while "Feelin' Kinda Sporty" won the ARIA Award for Best Video in 1997 and he has received seven other ARIA Award nominations. Since 2009, Graney has co-presented a radio show on Melbourne's 3RRR called Banana Lounge Broadcasting or BLB. He has published two memoirs, 1001 Australian Nights (2011) and WORKSHY (2018) and two lyrics books It Is Written, Baby (1997) and There He Goes with His Eye Out (2023)

== Biography ==
=== Early years to The Moodists ===
Graney grew up in Mount Gambier, South Australia. He attended St Mary's Primary School, Marist Brothers College, McDonald Park Primary School and Mount Gambier High School. He finished school after Year 12. In 1978, he relocated to Adelaide and, as lead vocalist, he teamed with drummer Clare Moore to form Sputniks with Liz Dealey on bass guitar, Phillip Costello on guitar and Steve Miller on guitar. Sputniks released one single, "Second Glance" on an independent label before moving to Melbourne in 1979 where they disbanded. Graney, Miller and Moore formed post-punk group The Moodists with Steve Carman on bass guitar in 1980. They released a single "Where the Trees Walk Downnhill"/"I Should Have Been Here" on the Au Go Go label. Carman was soon replaced by Chris Walsh on bass guitar. This line-up released a single "Gone Dead"/"Chad's Car", and an EP "Engine Shudder" on the Au Go Go label. In April 1983, Mick Turner (previously in Sick Things, Fungus Brains, later in Dirty Three) joined on guitar and they relocated to the United Kingdom in October. They released their studio album "Thirsty's Calling" in 1984 on the Red Flame label with Victor Van Vugt co producing with band along with engineer Tony Harris . Red Flame also released a six track mini album in 1985 called "Double Life". A single "Justice and Money Too" was released on the Creation label. Chris Walsh left in the same year, 1985. David McClymont joined on bass and the band recorded two 12" EPs "Take the Red Carpet out of Town" and "Someone's Got to Give" on the T.I.M. label in the UK.

=== 1986–1998: The Coral Snakes and White Buffaloes ===
In late 1986, The Moodists ground to a halt and after taking a break Dave Graney and Clare Moore formed Dave Graney 'n' the Coral Snakes (also seen as Dave Graney with the Coral Snakes) in late 1987 and played in London pubs and clubs. Other members were Gordy Blair on bass guitar, Malcolm Ross (ex-Orange Juice, The Moodists) on guitar and Louis Vause on piano and keyboards. In 1988, with Barry Adamson (former member of Magazine, Nick Cave and the Bad Seeds) producing, they recorded enough material for an extended play, "At His Stone Beach" released in September on the Fire label. The cover had ornate Edwardian lettering by UK illustrator Dave Western. By 1989, Graney and Moore were ordered out of the country by UK immigration authorities. The four tracks, "World Full of Daughters", "Listen to Her Lovers Sing", "A Deal Made for Somebody Else" and "The Greatest Show in Town", were later included on CD version of the Dave Graney with the White Buffaloes album, "My Life on the Plains".

Back in Melbourne, the couple formed Dave Graney with The White Buffaloes with Rod Hayward (ex-Little Murders) on guitar, Conway Savage (Boy Kings) on keyboards and Walsh (The Moodists) on bass guitar. Graney sported an Edwardian/Western image, wearing snakeskin and brown suede, sporting a curled moustache and waxed goatee. The band released "My Life on the Plains" in 1989 with Phil Vinall producing. Vinall, a friend of Graney and Moore, later worked with The Auteurs, Placebo and Magic Dirt (among others). The album included tracks written by other artists, such as Gene Clark, Fred Neil, Gram Parsons and the traditional "Streets of Laredo". In their live shows they included songs by Doug Sahm, Lou Reed, Buffy Sainte-Marie and Tim Rose. The title was from an autobiographical tome by George Armstrong Custer in 1876, the year he died at the Battle of the Little Bighorn. The cover featured images of a young Jesse James, Custer and ornate Edwardian lettering by London artist Dave Western, based on a Frederic Remington cowboy painting. It reflected Graney's obsession with wild western myth and late 1960s psychedelic bands with similar tastes, The Charlatans and Quicksilver Messenger Service from San Francisco. No singles were released from the album, although a video was shot by Tony Mahony for "Robert Ford on the Stage". Savage left to join Nick Cave and the Bad Seeds and they were joined on pedal steel guitar by Graham Lee (The Triffids). This line-up recorded "Codine", a live in the studio four track extended play, which was issued late in the year. It was later added to the CD version of the "I Was The Hunter... and I Was The Prey" album. "Codine" was written by Buffy Sainte-Marie and had been performed by The Charlatans in swaggering space cowboy style while the Dave Graney with the White Buffaloes cover version was equally tough. The EP sleeve was another Dave Western illustration.

During June 1990, Graney, Moore and Hayward travelled to London and recorded "I Was the Hunter... and I Was the Prey" with Blair on bass guitar, Ross on guitar, and Vause on piano. The album was produced by Vinall at a Croydon home studio run by former Procol Harum organist Matthew Fisher. The cover by Western shows Graney with full 'Hickok' curled moustache and velvet pomp. It was not issued until May 1992, due to a crisis with indie distribution in the UK, under the name Dave Graney with the Coral Snakes. In mid-1991, the band had moved back to Melbourne with a line-up of Blair, Graney, Moore, and Hayward; with Robin Casinader on keyboards (ex-the Wreckery). In July 1992, they released a live album, Lure of the Tropics on the Torn & Frayed label on Shock Records. It was recorded at St Kilda's Prince of Wales Hotel. The cover art was by Tony Mahony, the album featured three other improvised tracks (along with the title piece) and was originally mixed by Phil McKellar – it was re-released in 1997 with extra tracks and remixed by Tony Cohen.

For their April 1993 album, Night of the Wolverine, the band signed with PolyGram, Andrew Picouleau (ex-Sacred Cowboys) provided the bass guitar and Tony Cohen co-produced. The album has been described as "a certified Australian rock classic. It captured Graney at a new peak of his songwriting powers ... [tracks were] full of elegant and eccentric detail". Tex Perkins (The Cruel Sea) guested on lead vocals for "Night of the Wolverine II" with Amanda Brotchie on backing vocals. The title track and "You're Just Too Hip, Baby" reached No. 48 and No. 59 on Triple J's Hottest 100 for 1993. Cover art was by Mahony who directed the video for "You're Just Too Hip, Baby". The band toured outside the inner city of Melbourne and Sydney for the first time backing Hunters & Collectors, then The Cruel Sea before heading their own national tour. The album and tours had raised their profile with mainstream music critics. "Night of the Wolverine" earned an ARIA Award nomination for 'Best Alternative Release' at the 1994 ceremony. It was released on the This Way Up label in the UK in 1996.

The band's next album, "You Wanna Be There But You Don't Wanna Travel", which peaked at No. 10 on the Australian Recording Industry Association (ARIA) Album Charts, was released in June 1994. With Blair back on bass guitar, it was co-produced with Cohen. The singles from the album were, "I'm Gonna Release Your Soul" in April, and "You Wanna Be Loved" in August. A limited edition of the album included a bonus disc, Unbuttoned, with seven extra tracks. The promotional film clip for "I'm Gonna Release Your Soul", directed by Mahony, was nominated as 'Best Video' in 1995.

The group's July 1995 album, The Soft 'n' Sexy Sound, was produced by Victor Van Vugt. It reached the Top 40 and earned Graney the 'Best Male Artist' accolade at the 1996 ARIA Music Awards. Graney was wearing a hot pink, crushed velvet suit and a wig and said (under his breath) 'King of Pop'. This was a reference to a 1970s pop award which was presented by teen magazine, Go-Set. The album also received nominations as 'Best Cover Art' for Mahony and 'Producer of the Year' for Victor Vaughan [sic]. (Note: Australian Recording Industry Association incorrectly spells producer, Victor Van Vugt, as Victor Vaughan.) "I'm not Afraid to Be Heavy" (June), "Rock 'n' Roll Is Where I Hide" (August) and "I'm Gonna Live in My Own Big World" (February 1996) were issued as singles. The limited edition album's bonus disc, Music for Colourful Racing Identities, featured seven live tracks. It was also accompanied by a media CD with an interview of Graney by HG Nelson called A Word in Yer Shell, Like. It was released in the UK and Europe on the This Way Up label in 1996. Graney and Moore spent six months of the year recording and working in London.

The next album, The Devil Drives, was released in May 1997, and reached the Top 20. It was recorded in Melbourne and mixed in London at Maison Rouge studios and co-produced by Graney, Moore and David Ruffy along with engineer Kenny Jones. It spawned the single, "Feelin' Kinda Sporty" (co-written with Clare Moore) . The single won 'Best Video' by Mahony in 1997, the album was nominated for 'Best Cover Art' by Mahony and Graney received a nomination as 'Best Male Artist'. The single was promoted with an appearance on the daytime soap Neighbours, in which Dave sent up his sinister lounge-core persona in a pastel blue suit and a fedora – in one memorable scene holding the character Toadfish upside down and shaking him for the return of his mobile phone. It is unknown what if any impact this had on sales of the record. The second single was "A Man on the Make". The Devil Drives was the last studio album for Dave Graney and the Coral Snakes and with Universal Music as Graney and Moore disbanded the group and parted ways with the label in December. Album also accompanied by a media CD with an interview with Dave Graney called Coffins Have no Pockets, which was part of a media booklet based on a Holden Monaro owner's manual. In 1997 Graney released his first book, It is Written, Baby, a collection of his lyrics interspersed with fragments of journalism, memoir and opinion, with photographs by Mahony.

Dave Graney 'n' the Coral Snakes released a compilation, The Baddest, in September 1999. It included an unreleased version of "The Sheriff of Hell" from The Devil Drives which was re-recorded and remixed with Andrew Duffield (ex-Models) on keyboards, Phil Kenihan and Billy Miller (The Ferrets) on guitar and vocals. The same team had remixed "Feelin' Kinda Sporty" the previous year. It also featured an unreleased cover version of the AC/DC song "Show Business". Cover art was provided by Tony Mahony.

=== 1998–present: The Dave Graney Show- the Royal Dave Graney Show – the Lurid Yellow Mist to the mistLY ===
Graney and Moore's next band was The Dave Graney Show (elaborated in 2003 to The Royal Dave Graney Show), which formed in early 1998 with Stuart Perera on guitar and Adele Pickvance (Robert Forster Band) on bass guitar. The single, "Between Times", and The Dave Graney Show were released in November on Festival Records. Guest musicians included Duffield, Sean Kelly (ex-Models) on backing vocals and Billy Miller. It was co-produced with Duffield and Kenihan. In February 1999, "Your Masters Must Be Pleased with You" was released as a single and Billy Miller had permanently joined the line-up. The latter single's video was part of a twenty-minute film shot and edited by Mahony called Smile and Wave. This album saw half of it recorded and played by only Graney and Moore, then the rest of the band was brought in to play the other half.

Graney and Moore continued to perform live around Australia and released material on their own Melbourne based label, Cockaigne. Cockaigne's first release was The Dave Graney Show's single, "Drugs are Wasted on the Young" in February 2000 ahead of the album, Kiss Tomorrow Goodbye in April. It was co-produced by Graney, Moore and Adam Rhodes. Other singles were "Out of the Loop" (with Mahony video) and "Have You Heard About the Melbourne Mafia?", both with cover art by Mahony. Graney described the album as "dark, brandy flavoured funk". It was released in the UK and Europe on Cooking Vinyl. A tour of Europe, with a line-up of Graney, Moore and Perera, supporting Nick Cave and The Bad Seeds followed in 2001. It was during this tour that Graney contracted a filthy lung infection which resulted in an operation at a hospital in Paris. Clare Moore released her first solo album, The Third Woman, on Chapter Music in August.

July 2002, saw the release of Heroic Blues, which was produced by Graney, Moore and Adam Rhodes. The single, "Are We Goin' Too Fast For Love?", was issued. The title track was recorded live at a sound check at the Tarwin Lower Pub earlier in the year. Graney improvised the vocal about a performer playing to an empty room. He called it a "folk soul" album.

Moore appeared with Melbourne band, The Sand Pebbles, on stage as well as on record. She contributed strings and keyboards to albums by Kim Salmon as well as the Wagons. She played on Robert Forster's (The Go-Betweens) covers CD I Had a New York Girlfriend. She appears with Jane Dust and the Giant Hoopoes, her own band the Dames and with jazz combination Henry Manetta and the Trip. Graney and Moore engineered and mixed the debut albums by the Darling Downs (Salmon and Ron Peno) and the Muddy Spurs. They both played in Salmon, the seven guitar, two drummer heavy rock orchestra devised and led by Kim Salmon.

In 2003, Graney and Moore briefly reformed The Moodists – with Turner, Steve Miller and Walsh – for a limited number of performances in Melbourne to promote the release of a double compilation album, Two Fisted Art (1980 -1986). The album was released on the W.Minc label – run by Steve Miller – in 2003 and contains nineteen of the band's studio tracks on the first disc and sixteen previously unreleased live recordings (recorded in Sydney (March 1983), Melbourne (December 1984) and London (July 1985)) on the second disc. As Dave Graney and Clare Moore, the couple worked on the soundtrack for the feature film, Bad Eggs, and released Music from the Motion Picture – Bad Eggs in July. They received a nomination for ARIA Award for Best Original Soundtrack, Cast or Show Album at the 2003 ceremony.

The Brother Who Lived was released in 2003 by The Royal Dave Graney Show (a nod to the Royal Melbourne Show) – with a line-up of Graney on vocals, harmonica, organ, and bass, acoustic and electric guitars; Moore on drums, vocals, keyboards, percussion; Billy Miller on acoustic and electric guitars, and vocals; Perera on vocals and electric guitar; and Pickvance on vocals, percussion and bass guitar. It was produced by Graney, Moore and J Walker. Singles issued were "Midnight to Dawn" and "All Our Friends Were Stars". The latter had a video shot and edited by Graney, Tony Mahony made a video for "The Brother Who Lived". The main part of the album was recorded, after The Moodists reunion, in a day with all the band in the studio together. Four other tracks were recorded and mixed by Graney and Moore at their Melbourne studio. Pickvance left the group and bass guitar was taken up by Stu Thomas (Kim Salmon and the Surrealists, Kim Salmon and the Business, Salmon, The Stu Thomas Paradox) in 2004.

Graney contributed music to and played a small (musical) part in a stage production of the 1960s British play Stone in 2004. Graney and Moore released a double album, Hashish and Liquor, in 2005, with the first disc, Hashish performed by Graney and the second, Liquor by Moore. Jazz pianist Mark Fitzgibbon played on a lot of the album and Warren Ellis (Bad Seeds-Dirty Three) guested on flute, mandolin and violin.

In 2006, Graney's Point Blank was recorded, which he described as "a song cycle of a life as a heavy entertainer", for which he was accompanied by jazz musician Mark Fitzgibbon (The Moodists) on piano and Clare Moore on vibraphone. Concurrently, a touring trio of Graney (12-string, vocal), Moore (vibes, vocal) and Stu Thomas aka Stu D (baritone guitar, vocal) was formed, performing extensively across Australia, in support of the 2006 CD, Keepin' it Unreal on Cockaigne. This trio appeared in Europe in 2008 as opening act for Nick Cave and the Bad Seeds.

In 2007 Graney and Moore with guitarist, Perera, pianist Mark Fitzgibbon and bass player Stu Thomas were billed as The Lurid Yellow Mist featuring Dave Graney and Clare Moore (or as Dave Graney and The Lurid Yellow Mist). The name of the band, according to Moore, was based on the strange miasmic cloud that the man in the 1957 science fiction film, The Incredible Shrinking Man drove his speedboat through just before he started his transformation. As a collective they worked on a batch of new songs at the Yarraville Mouth Organ Band (YMOB) hall, before entering Sing Sing Studios in September where they laid down eight tracks in a day, virtually recording live. Graney and Moore then mixed it at their home studio, Ponderosa, finishing in November. The resultant album, We Wuz Curious was released on the Illustrious Artists label on 14 June 2008. The first single, "I'm in the Future Now", issued in November 2007, had music written by Stu Thomas, who also made the video (filmed in Cocos Islands). A video was also made for "Let's Kill God Again", which received some radio promotion.

In May 2009, Graney released his first album credited as a solo billing, Knock Yourself Out. Described by Graney as an "electro boogie" album. It was produced, recorded and mixed by Graney, with Moore co-writing some tracks, arranging and contributing instrumentation, with Thomas and Perera from The Lurid Yellow Mist as guest performers. A video was produced for the title track, "Knock Yourself Out", directed by Nick Cowan, it was shot in Hosier Lane and Smith Street, Melbourne.

A follow-up show to the narrative performance Point Blank was performed at the Butterfly Club in 2009, which was called Live in Hell. It featured songs by Graney with other Hell-related tunes by Elvis Presley, Roxy Music, the Fall and the Doors. Mostly without any amplification, the line-up was Perera on acoustic guitar, Thomas on bass guitar, Moore on a small drum kit and Graney on vocals. In 2010, a third narrative style show was performed at the Butterfly Club. MC Bits featured the duo of Graney accompanied by Mark Fitzgibbon on piano.

2010 saw the release of Supermodified, a remix and remastering compilation project where Graney went back to the 2001 and 2003 albums Heroic Blues and The Brother Who Lived to sing, play extra guitars and add keyboards and percussion and remix the songs. Previously unreleased tracks were included in the package of 18 tracks, with a Mahony illustration on the cover.

2011 saw the release of Rock'n'Roll is Where I Hide, on Liberation. The album was recorded at Soundpark in Melbourne by Graney and The Lurid Yellow Mist and mixed by Victor Van Vugt in New York. A collection of re-recordings with The Lurid Yellow Mist of songs from his back catalogue. It was released with Graney's second book, 1001 Australian Nights, by Affirm Press, which concentrates on his life as an artist and performer.

In 2012, the band's name was altered to Dave Graney & The mistLY, and the album You've Been in My Mind was released by Cockaigne. The lead single was "Flash in the Pantz", with an accompanying video of the band shot live at Meredith Music Festival 2011. A further video for "We Need a Champion" was filmed and edited by Nick Cowan.

Graney and Moore also played and recorded an album as rhythm section for Howard and the NDE, a band fronted by old friend Harry Howard (These Immortal Souls, Crime & the City Solution, the Pink Stainless Tail) and Edwina Preston.

2013 saw a series of digital only singles released as work was begun on a solo acoustic album.

A fourth narrative show was also performed at the Butterfly Club in Melbourne. A solo show called Early Folk featured Dave Graney playing songs from across his career which had been inspired by the town of Mt Gambier.

May 2014 saw the release of Fearful Wiggings, the second album to be credited as a "solo" album. Again, Clare Moore featured extensively on the album playing vibes and singing. UK guitarist Nick Harper played on two tracks and Graney recorded all the lead vocals with Lisa Gerard (Dead Can Dance) at her studio in country Victoria. Three songs from the album had accompanying video clips. The song "Everything was Legendary with Robert" had a video made for it by film makers Donna McRae and Michael Vale, while a video for "Country Roads, Unwinding" was made by Dave Graney. This video featured footage of the drive along the Coorong between Adelaide and Mount Gambier shot by Heath Britton.

2015 saw the release of several digital only albums. 2015 also saw the first of several reunion shows with Dave Graney 'n' the Coral Snakes, playing to sellout crowds in Melbourne, Sydney, Newcastle and Adelaide.

The Melbourne annual Leaps and Bounds Festival honoured Dave Graney and Clare Moore as Living Legends and a concert was held at the Gasometer Hotel with many Melbourne musicians paying tribute to the pair by playing their songs. The performances went for 5 hours.

Dave Graney and The mistLY played an ATP Festival in Prestatyn, Wales, curated by comedian Stewart Lee, a long time supporter of their activities. They joined up with former guitarist Malcolm Ross and played shows in Edinburgh, Glasgow, Manchester (including a BBC6 session with dj Marc Riley) and continued on to dates in France, Holland, Belgium and London.

In July 2016 there was a further return show for Dave Graney 'n' the Coral Snakes to a packed house in Melbourne.

In April 2019, Dave Graney and The mistLY released an album called Zippa Deedoo What Is/Was That/This?

In November 2019 a digital only studio album was released by Dave Graney and Clare Moore called One Million Years DC. The album featured guest appearances by Shane Reilly from the Lost Ragas on pedal steel and Coral Snake Robin Casinader on mellotron.

In December 2019, Dave Graney and Clare Moore were inducted into South Australian Music Hall of Fame.

In 2021, the album Everything Was Funny was released, credited to Dave Graney and Clare Moore.

In 2022, the album In a Mistly was released, credited to Dave Graney and Clare Moore.

2023 saw a national tour by Dave Graney and the Coral Snakes for the 30th anniversary of the Night Of The Wolverine album.

In April 2024, Dave Graney and Clare Moore released (strangely) (emotional).

November 2024, digital studio album by Graney and Clare Moore I Passed Through Minor Chord in a Morning.

April 2026 saw the release of the Dave Graney and Clare Moore album Laburnum Of The Mind on Compact Disc, digital streaming and vinyl.

== Other performances ==
Graney has played at the Big Day Out festival on many occasions, as well as the Livid festival and the Falls Festival. He performed on the TV shows Recovery, Nomad, Smash Hits, Live and Sweaty, Denton, Midday with Kerry Anne, Jimeoin, Shaun Micallef's Micallef Tonight, Mornings with Bert Newton, AM with Denise Drysdale, Sale of the Century, The Games, RocKwiz, Spicks and Specks, Australia's Dumbest Musician, Neighbours (two-episode story), Review, and Roy and HG's Club Buggery (1996–1997). He wrote a lyric book, It Is Written, Baby. With Moore, he composed and performed the score of the movie Bad Eggs, and for Mahony's short film Ray. Graney contributed music to and played a small (musical) part in Stone, a stage production of the 1960s British play.

In September 2013, Graney also sang on Nick Harper's CD (Riven) on a track called "The Beginning is Nigh".

== Bibliography ==
- Graney, Dave (1997). It Is Written, Baby. Photographs by Tony Mahony. Milsons Point, New South Wales: Random House. ISBN 0-09-183666-2.
- Graney, Dave (2011). 1001 Australian Nights : An Aesthetic Memoir. Mulgrave, Victoria: Affirm Press. ISBN 978-0-9807904-3-6.
- Graney, Dave. Workshy: My Life as a Bludge. Mulgrave, Victoria: Affirm Press. ISBN 9781925584325
- Graney, Dave. There He Goes with His Eye Out (collected lyrics 1980–2023).

== Discography ==
=== Studio albums ===
List of studio albums, with selected chart positions and certifications
Title	Album details	Peak chart positions
Title	Album details	AUS
My Life on the Plains (with The White Buffaloes)	Released: 1989; Label: Id, Mercury Records (532864-2); Formats: CD, CS, LP	–
I Was the Hunter... and I Was the Prey (with the Coral Snakes)	Released: 1991; Label: Id, Mercury Records (532865-2); Formats: CD, CS, LP	–
Night of the Wolverine (with the Coral Snakes)	Released: 1993; Label: Id, Mercury Records (Id00152); Formats: CD	–
You Wanna Be There But You Don't Wanna Travel (with the Coral Snakes)	Released: June 1994; Label: Id, Mercury Records (522381-2); Formats: CD	10
The Soft 'n' Sexy Sound (with the Coral Snakes)	Released: July 1995; Label: Id, Mercury Records (528416-2); Formats: CD	36
The Devil Drives (with the Coral Snakes)	Released: May 1997; Label: Id, Mercury Records (534803-2); Formats: CD	18
The Dave Graney Show (as The Dave Graney Show)	Released: November 1998; Label: Festival Records (D31911); Formats: CD	–
Kiss Tomorrow Goodbye (as The Dave Graney Show)	Released: April 2000; Label: Cockaigne (COCK002); Formats: CD, digital	–
Heroic Blues (as The Dave Graney Show)	Released: 2002; Label: Cockaigne (COCK005); Formats: CD, digital	–
The Brother Who Lived (as The Royal Dave Graney Show)	Released: October 2003; Label: Cockaigne (COCK008); Formats: CD, digital	–
Hashish and Liquor (with Clare Moore)	Released: 2005; Label: Reverberation (REV018); Formats: 2×CD, digital	–
Keepin' It Unreal (with Clare Moore)	Released: 2006; Label: Reverberation (REV029); Formats: CD, digital	–
We Wuz Curious (As The Lurid Yellow Mist featuring Dave Graney And Clare Moore)	Released: June 2008; Label: Illustrious Artists (IARLP 204); Formats: CD, digital	–
Knock Yourself Out	Released: May 2009; Label: Cockaigne (COCK017); Formats: CD, digital	–
Supermodified (with The Lurid Yellow Mist)	Released: August 2010; Label: Cockaigne (COCK018); Formats: CD, digital	–
Rock 'n' Roll Is Where I Hide	Released: April 2011; Label: Liberation Music (LMCD0132); Formats: CD, digital	–
You've Been in My Mind (with the MistLY)	Released: 2012; Label: Cockaigne (COCK021); Formats: CD, digital	–
Fearful Wiggings	Released: 2014; Label: Cockaigne (COCK030); Formats: CD, digital	–
Let's Get Tight (with Clare Moore)	Released: 2017; Label: Cockaigne (COCK55); Formats: CD, digital	–
Zippa Deedoo What Is/Was That/This (with the MistLY)	Released: March 2019; Label: Cockaigne (COCK063); Formats: CD, digital	–
One Million Years DC (with Clare Moore)	Released: October 2019; Label: Cockaigne; Formats: digital	–
Everything Was Funny (with Clare Moore)	Released: October 2021; Label: Cockaigne (COCK70); Formats: CD, digital	–
In a MistLY (with Clare Moore)	Released: November 2022; Label: Cockaigne (COCK75); Formats: CD, digital	–
(strangely) (emotional) (with Clare Moore)	Released: April 2024; Label: Cockaigne; Formats: CD, digital	–
I Passed Through Minor Chord in a Morning (with Clare Moore)	Released: November 2024; Label: Cockaigne; Formats: digital	–
Laburnum Of The Mind (with Clare Moore)	Released April 2026 Label : Cockaigne Formats : CD Digital Vinyl	

=== Soundtracks ===
List of soundtrack albums, with selected chart positions and certifications
Title	Album details	Peak chart positions
Title	Album details	AUS
Bad Eggs (with Clare Moore)	Released: July 2003; Label: Liberation Music (LIBCD5077.2); Formats: CD	–
Johnny Ghost (with Clare Moore)	Released: 2011; Label: Cockaigne; Formats: digital	-
Lost Gully Road (with Clare Moore)	Released: 2017; Label: Cockaigne; Formats: digital	-

=== Live albums ===
List of live albums, with selected chart positions and certifications
Title	Album details	Peak chart positions
Title	Album details	AUS
The Lure of the Tropics (with the Coral Snakes)	Released: July 1992; Label: Torn & Frayed (TORN CD 1); Formats: CD,	–
Point Blank (with Clare Moore and Mark Fitzgibbon)	Released: April 2015; Label: Wolverine Enterprises; Formats: digital	–
Live in Hell (with Clare Moore, Stu Thomas and Stuart Perera)	Released: April 2015; Label: Wolverine Enterprises; Formats: digital	–
In Concert (with Clare Moore and Robin Casinader)	Released: May 2020; Label: Wolverine Enterprises; Formats: digital	–
Dave Graney and Clare Moore with Georgio "the dove" Valentino and Malcolm Ross	Released: August 2020; Label: Wolverine Enterprises; Formats: digital	–
Lyve At Byrds (with the MistLY)	Released: February 2022; Label: Cockaigne; Formats: digital; Note: Recorded on 8 November 2019 at Bird's Basement, Melbourne	–

=== Compilation albums ===
List of compilation albums, with selected chart positions and certifications
Title	Album details	Peak chart positions
Title	Album details	AUS
The Soft 'n' Sexy Sound and Simply The Best 'El Supremo (with the Coral Snakes)	Released: November 1996; Label: Id, Mercury Records; Formats: 2×CD	–
The Baddest (with the Coral Snakes)	Released: 1999; Label: Grudge (153754-2); Formats: CD	–
The Mercury Years 1994-1997 (with the Coral Snakes)	Released: May 2013; Label: Universal Music Australia; Formats: 4×CD, digital	–
Play mistLY for Me – Live Recordings Vol 1	Released: February 2015; Label: Wolverine Enterprises; Formats: digital	–
Night of the Wolverine Demos	Released: August 2015; Label: Wolverine Enterprises; Formats: digital	–
Once I Loved the Torn Ocean's Road: 80s/90s Demos Vol. 2	Released: October 2015; Label: Wolverine Enterprises; Formats: digital	–

=== Extended plays ===
List of EPS with selected chart positions and certifications
Title	Album details	Peak chart positions
Title	Album details	AUS
At His Stone Beach (with The White Buffaloes)	Released: September 1988 (UK); Label: Fire Records (BLAZE 32T); Formats: 12" LP	–
Codine (with The White Buffaloes)	Released: 1990 (UK); Label: Fire Records (BLAZE 45T); Formats: 12" LP; Note: Recorded Live in Melbourne	–

=== Charting singles ===
List of charting singles, with selected chart positions
Title	Year	Peak chart positions	Album
Title	Year	AUS	Album
"I'm Gonna Release Your Soul" (with the Coral Snakes)	1994	81	You Wanna Be There But You Don't Wanna Travel
"Feelin' Kinda Sporty" (with the Coral Snakes)	1997	78	The Devil Drives

== Awards and nominations ==
=== ARIA Awards ===
The ARIA Music Awards are presented annually from 1987 by the Australian Recording Industry Association (ARIA). Graney and Dave Graney 'n' the Coral Snakes have won two awards from nine nominations.

Year	Nominee / work	Award	Result
1994	Night of the Wolverine – Dave Graney & the Coral Snakes	Best Alternative Release	Nominated
1995	"I'm Gonna Release Your Soul" – Tony Mahony (Note: Australian Recording Industry Association incorrectly spells video director or cover artist as Tony Mahoney.) – Dave Graney & the Coral Snakes	Best Video	Nominated
1996	The Soft 'n' Sexy Sound – Dave Graney	Best Male Artist	Won
1996	The Soft 'n' Sexy Sound – Victor Van Vugt – Dave Graney & the Coral Snakes'	Producer of the Year	Nominated
1996	The Soft 'n' Sexy Sound – Tony Mahony – Dave Graney & the Coral Snakes	Best Cover Art	Nominated
1997	The Devil Drives – Dave Graney	Best Male Artist	Nominated
1997	"Feelin' Kinda Sporty" – Tony Mahony – Dave Graney & the Coral Snakes	Best Video	Won
1997	The Devil Drives – Tony Mahony – Dave Graney & the Coral Snakes	Best Cover Art	Nominated
2003	Music from the Motion Picture – Bad Eggs – Dave Graney and Clare Moore	Best Original Soundtrack Album	Nominated

=== EG Awards / Music Victoria Awards ===
The EG Awards (known as Music Victoria Awards since 2013) are an annual awards night celebrating Victorian music. They commenced in 2006.

Year	Nominee / work	Award	Result
2012	Dave Graney	Best Male	Nominated

=== South Australian Music Awards ===
The South Australian Music Awards (previously known as the Fowler's Live Music Awards) are annual awards that exist to recognise, promote and celebrate excellence in the South Australian contemporary music industry. They commenced in 2012.

Year	Nominee / work	Award	Result (wins only)
2019	Dave Graney	South Australian Music Hall of Fame	inducted

== Notes and references ==
=== References ===
General

- Lewis, Jonathan. Dave Graney Biography at AllMusic. Retrieved 12 January 2011.

Specific
