= You Wanna Be There But You Don't Wanna Travel =

Studio album by Dave Graney 'n' the Coral Snakes
- Released: June 1994
- Recorded: January–February, April 1994
- Studios: Metropolis Studios, Melbourne
- Genre: Rock
- Length: 57:37
- Label: Mercury / Id
- Producers: Dave Graney 'n' the Coral Snakes, Tony Cohen

Dave Graney 'n' the Coral Snakes chronology
Night of the Wolverine (1993)	You Wanna Be There But You Don't Wanna Travel (1994)	The Soft 'n' Sexy Sound (1995)

You Wanna Be There But You Don't Wanna Travel is the fourth album by Dave Graney 'n' the Coral Snakes (also seen as Dave Graney with the Coral Snakes). With Graney on vocals, the Coral Snakes line-up included his wife Clare Moore on drums and percussion; Robin Casinader on keyboards, violin and mandolin; Rob Hayward on lead guitar; and early member Gordy Blair returned on bass guitar. It was released in June 1994 on Mercury Records. The album peaked at No. 10 on the Australian Recording Industry Association (ARIA) Album Charts. It was co-produced by the band with Tony Cohen.

The singles from the album were, "I'm Gonna Release Your Soul" in April, and "You Wanna Be Loved" in August. The promotional film clip for "I'm Gonna Release Your Soul", directed by Tony Mahony, was nominated as 'Best Video' at the ARIA Music Awards of 1995.

== Background ==
You Wanna Be There But You Don't Wanna Travel is the fourth album for Dave Graney 'n' the Coral Snakes (also seen as Dave Graney with the Coral Snakes). For their previous album, Night of the Wolverine (April 1993), the band had signed with PolyGram, Andrew Picouleau (ex-Sacred Cowboys) provided the bass guitar and Tony Cohen co-produced. The band toured backing Hunters & Collectors, then The Cruel Sea before heading their own tour. The album and tours had raised their profile with mainstream music critics.

The band's fourth album, You Wanna Be There But You Don't Wanna Travel, which peaked at No. 10 on the Australian Recording Industry Association (ARIA) Album Charts, was released in June 1994. The line-up was Graney on vocals, Clare Moore on drums and percussion, Robin Casinader on keyboards, violin and mandolin, Rob Hayward on lead guitar and earlier member, Gordy Blair back on bass guitar. It was also co-produced by the group with Cohen. The singles from the album were, "I'm Gonna Release Your Soul" in April, and "You Wanna Be Loved" in August. Promotional film clip for "I'm Gonna Release Your Soul", directed by Mahony, was nominated as 'Best Video' in 1995.

Tony Mahony came up with an idea to do a one shot clip. This involved a lot of things going right on the day and we kept the very last run through.

— Dave Graney

The limited edition album, the first 1,000 copies, included a bonus disc, Unbuttoned, with seven extra tracks.

The band was full of creativity, in April, as the record was going into production, we were asked to record some extra songs as a give away disc and came up with seven extra tracks. They included a cover version of "Pillow Talk" by Sylvia Robinson and "32-20 Blues" by Robert Johnson (The Charlatans). It also included a song, "Late, Late, Late" written and sung by Robin Casinader.

— Dave Graney

You Wanna Be There But You Don't Wanna Travel was released in the UK and Europe on This Way Up label in 1996, with a different cover and a different track listing.

== Reception ==
=== Professional reviews ===
Professional ratings
Review scores
Source	Rating
Allmusic	8/10 stars

Allmusic's Jonathan Lewis said the album was released "At a time when grunge was still a potent force, ... Graney continued to defy trends by releasing successful albums that owed more to lounge music than they did '70s rock". Ed Nimmervoll described Graney, "he had everything going for him - critics, the audience and the record company ... reinvent himself in line with the expectation, and did, changing into the larger-than-life satin-suited rock and roll hustler". Ian McFarlane said the band "consolidated their new-found success with the album".

== Track listing ==
Original Australian release

1. "I'm Gonna Release Your Soul" (Dave Graney) – 3:45
2. "There Was a Time" (Graney) – 3:30
3. "You Wanna Be Loved" (Graney) – 4:59
4. "Warren Oates" (Graney) – 3:39
5. "Soul into Time" (Graney) – 4:28
6. "Won't You Ride with Me" (Graney, Rob Hayward) – 4:14
7. "New Life in a New Town" (Graney) – 3:13
8. "Livin' Out Your Tomorrow (Hard Against Yesterday)" (Graney, Clare Moore) – 4:20
9. "Imagine If What You Did on Your Weekend Was Your Life" (Graney) – 4:21
10. "You Wanna Be There But You Don't Wanna Travel" (Graney) – 4:06
11. "Let Me Tell You About Yourself" (Graney) – 4:23
12. "The Word Is Nah" (Graney) – 2:47
13. "The Stars Baby, the Stars" (Graney) – 4:21
14. "We Didn't Have the Words to Say It (We Didn't Have the Words to Get Around)" (Graney, Robin Casinader) – 5:29

Unbuttoned

1. "The Confessions of Serge Gainsbourg" (Moore, Hayward, Casinader, Gordy Blair) – 6:48
2. "It's Your Crowd I Hate" (Graney, Moore, Blair, Hayward, Casinader) – 5:16
3. "Late, Late, Late" (Casinader) – 3:28
4. "The Lady from Bangkok" (Graney, Moore, Blair, Hayward, Casinader) – 4:10
5. "Pillow Talk" (Michael Burton, Sylvia Robinson) – 4:39
6. "Java la Grande (Celestial Boogie)" (Graney, Blair) – 4:25
7. "32-20 Blues" (Robert Johnson) – 3:28

1996 European release

1. "The Confessions of Serge Gainsbourg" (Moore, Hayward, Casinader, Blair) – 6:44
2. "The Stars Baby, the Stars" (Graney) – 4:19
3. "I'm Gonna Release Your Soul" (Graney) – 3:45
4. "There Was a Time" (Graney) – 3:30
5. "You Wanna Be Loved" (Graney) – 4:59
6. "Warren Oates" (Graney) – 3:39
7. "Soul into Time" (Graney) – 4:28
8. "Won't You Ride with Me" (Graney, Hayward) – 4:14
9. "The Word Is Nah" (Graney) – 2:47
10. "Livin' Out Your Tomorrow (Hard Against Yesterday)" (Graney, Moore) – 4:20
11. "Imagine If What You Did on Your Weekend Was Your Life" (Graney) – 4:21
12. "You Wanna Be There But You Don't Wanna Travel" (Graney) – 4:06
13. "We Didn't Have the Words to Say It (We Didn't Have the Words to Get Around)" (Graney, Casinader) – 5:29

== Personnel ==
Dave Graney 'n' the Coral Snakes members

- Gordy Blair – bass guitar
- Robin Casinader – keyboards, violin, mandolin, lead vocals (on "Late, Late, Late")
- Dave Graney – lead vocals (except "Late, Late, Late")
- Rob Hayward – guitar
- Clare Moore – drums, percussion

Production details

- Producer – Tony Cohen, Dave Graney 'n' the Coral Snakes
- Engineer – Tony Cohen
- Studio – Metropolis, Melbourne (recording, mixing)

Art work

- Cover art – Tony Mahony
