= Night of the Wolverine =

- 1993 Mercury digipak front cover

Studio album by Dave Graney 'n' the Coral Snakes
- Released: April 1993
- Recorded: 20–22 December 1992
- Genre: Rock
- Length: 53:40
- Label: Mercury
- Producers: Dave Graney 'n' the Coral Snakes, Tony Cohen

Dave Graney 'n' the Coral Snakes chronology
The Lure of the Tropics (1992)	Night of the Wolverine (1993)	You Wanna Be There But You Don't Wanna Travel (1994)

Alternative Cover
- 1996 re-release

Night of the Wolverine is the third album by Dave Graney 'n' the Coral Snakes (also seen as Dave Graney with the Coral Snakes). The album was released in April 1993 on Mercury Records. With Graney on vocals, the Coral Snakes line-up included his wife Clare Moore on drums and percussion; Robin Casinader on keyboards, violin and mandolin; Rob Hayward on lead guitar; and Andrew Picouleau on bass guitar. Tex Perkins of tour mates, The Cruel Sea, guested on lead vocals for "Night of the Wolverine II" with Amanda Mitchell on backing vocals. The title track and "You're Just Too Hip, Baby" reached No. 48 and No. 59, respectively, on Triple J's Hottest 100 for 1993. Night of the Wolverine earned an ARIA Award nomination for 'Best Alternative Release' at the 1994 ARIA Music Awards.

== Background ==
At the end of 1992, Graney signed a publishing deal with Polygram music and used the advance to finance the recording of Night of the Wolverine.

It was going to have to be cheap so we recorded what we'd been working on as "the soft'n'sexy shows" and got Andrew [Picouleau] in to guest on bass. On Saturday December the 19th we played at the Lounge, on the Sunday we recorded 9 songs at Metropolis, on the Monday and Tuesday we recorded two more songs and then mixed the whole lot at Atlantis. Adam Yazxhi, who had worked at MDS, who imported My Life on the Plains and I Was the Hunter... and I Was the Prey into Australia, was now setting up a small label at Mercury and wanted to put the album out. The title track was an attempt to make something in the style of Lou Reed's "Street Hassle". That was a long story song which featured a sweet middle section where Bruce Springsteen came in to read a few lines of lyrical stuff. In the middle of ours, Tex Perkins from the Cruel Sea came in and did something similar, "The King of Adelaide".

— Dave Graney

It is described as "a certified Australian rock classic. It captured Graney at the peak of his songwriting powers ... [tracks were] full of elegant and eccentric detail". Tex Perkins (The Cruel Sea) guested on lead vocals for "Night of the Wolverine II" with Amanda Mitchell on backing vocals. No singles were released but a video was made by Tony Mahony for the song "You're Just Too Hip, Baby". The title track and "You're Just Too Hip, Baby" reached No. 48 and No. 59, respectively, on Triple J's Hottest 100 for 1993. The band undertook a six-week national tour with Hunters & Collectors, followed by another national tour with The Cruel Sea; this raised their profile with mainstream music critics. The album earned an ARIA Award nomination for 'Best Alternative Release' at the 1994 ARIA Music Awards.

Night of the Wolverine was re-released in 1996 in Australia with a different cover, and in the United Kingdom on the This Way Up label. Two singles, "Three Dead Passengers" and "You're Just Too Hip, Baby" were released at that time. It was also re-released on the Cockaigne label in 2004 with extra tracks from albums after Coral Snakes disbanded.

== Reception ==
=== Professional reviews ===
Professional ratings
Review scores
Source	Rating
Allmusic	7/10 stars

Allmusic's Jonathan Lewis said the album was "Part lounge, part country, and part straightforward pop... A disarmingly likeable mixture of gently humorous lyrics backed by the impeccable musicianship of the Coral Snakes, this album deserved to be huge". Ed Nimmervoll described the album, "[it] revealed, the fertile imagination of its primary songwriter, shedding the cowboy clothes for the mysteriously elusive character of the 'Wolverine'. The album is one of the classic records of Australian music, Graney dipping into his own past as well as literature and film for inspiration. The album's contents, and high profile tours... set Dave Graney up to become a firm favourite with Australian music critics. Night of the Wolverine had been written and recorded without a conscious plan of attack. It just was". Ian McFarlane said it was "a certified Australian rock classic. It captured Graney at the peak of his songwriting powers... [tracks were] full of elegant and eccentric detail".

== Track listing ==
1. "You're Just Too Hip Baby" (Dave Graney) – 4:20
2. "Mogambo" (Graney) – 3:49
3. "Night of the Wolverine I" (Graney) – 4:46
4. "I'm Just Havin' One O' Those Lives"(Graney) – 3:47
5. "I Held the Cool Breeze" (Graney) – 4:24
6. "I Remember You (You're the Girl I Love)" (Graney) – 3:40
7. "Three Dead Passengers in a Stolen Second Hand Ford" (Graney, Stephen Cummings) – 4:00
8. "That's the Way It's Gonna Be"(Graney) – 3:56
9. "Maggie Cassidy" (Graney) – 4:11
10. "You Need to Suffer" (Graney) – 3:19
11. "Night of the Wolverine II" (Graney) – 8:32
  (i) "If I Could Have Stayed at Home"
  (ii) "The King of Adelaide"
  (iii) "You Could Always Make the Band Laugh"
12. "Out There (In the Night of Time)" (Graney) – 4:56

Bonus tracks

13. "Death by a Thousand Sucks" (Graney) – 3:36
14. "All of Me" (Clare Moore) – 2:58
15. "Don't Mess with the Blood" (Graney) – 3:28
16. "All Our Friends Were Stars" (Graney) – 3:53
17. "Are You Wearing Despair?" (Robin Casinader) – 5:59
18. "La Nuit du Wolverine" (Graney) – 4:46

== Personnel ==
Dave Graney 'n' the Coral Snakes members

- Robin Casinader – keyboards, violin, mandolin
- Dave Graney – vocals
- Rob Hayward – guitar
- Clare Moore – drums, percussion
- Andrew Picouleau – bass guitar

Additional musicians

- Amanda Mitchell – background vocals on "Night of the Wolverine II"
- Tex Perkins – lead vocals on "Night of the Wolverine II"

Production details

- Producer – Tony Cohen, Dave Graney 'n' the Coral Snakes
- Engineer – Tony Cohen
- Studio – Metropolis (recording); Atlantis, Melbourne (recording, mixing)

Art work

- Cover art – Tony Mahony
