= Give someone enough rope =

Give someone enough rope, and they will hang themselves is a proverb or idiomatic expression meaning that given the opportunity, a person will fail on their own merits, or suffer the consequences of their own actions.

Give someone enough rope or enough rope may also refer to:

- Give 'Em Enough Rope, a 1978 album by English punk group the Clash
- Enough Rope, a 2003 to 2008 Australian TV interview series
- Enough Rope (film), a 1963 film
- Enough Rope, Dorothy Parker's first collection of poetry in 1926

== See also ==
- Not Enough Rope
- Wikipedia:Give 'em enough rope, an essay about dealing with blocked editors
