= The Devil Drives =

Studio album by Dave Graney 'n' The Coral Snakes
- Released: May 1997
- Recorded: August 1996
- Studio: Kiss Studios, Melbourne
- Genre: Rock
- Label: Mercury
- Producer: Dave Graney, Clare Moore, David Ruffy

Dave Graney 'n' The Coral Snakes chronology
The Soft 'n' Sexy Sound (1995)	The Devil Drives (1997)	The Baddest (1999)

The Devil Drives is the sixth album by Dave Graney 'n' The Coral Snakes. It was released in May 1997 on Mercury Records. The album peaked at No. 18 on the Australian Recording Industry Association (ARIA) Album Charts. It was also produced by Dave Graney, Clare Moore and David Ruffy. The album was recorded in August 1996 in Kiss Studios, Melbourne and mixed in October 1996 at London at Matrix Maison Rouge studios.

The singles from the album were, "Feelin Kinda Sporty" in April, and "A Man on the Make" in September. The album was also accompanied by a media CD with an interview with Dave Graney called Coffins Have No Pockets. This was part of a media booklet based on a Holden Monaro owners manual in a plastic booklet/folder. The single won 'Best Video' by Mahony in 1997, the album was nominated for 'Best Cover Art' by Mahony and Graney received a nomination as 'Best Male Artist'. It was the last studio album with the Coral Snakes and with Universal Music as the group disbanded in December.

== Title concept ==
The name of the album follows the old proverb "Needs must when the devil drives", in which drive is a reference to coercing or (figuratively) pushing. However, the imagery of the album is suggestive of a literal interpretation of the devil driving (piloting) a car.

== Reception ==
=== Professional reviews ===
See table.

Professional ratings
Review scores
Source	Rating
Allmusic	4/5 stars

== Track listing ==
1. "The Oblivion Seekers" - 3:57
2. "My Only Regret (I Opened My Mouth)" - 4:25
3. "I Don't Know You Exist" - 4:15
4. "Rackin' Up Some Zeds" - 4:25
5. "Everybody Loves a Mass Killer" - 4:52
6. "I Dig the Pioneers" - 3:50
7. "The Sheriff of Hell" - 4:58
8. "Pianola Roll" - 3:16
9. "Land of the Giants" - 5:24
10. "I Love Your Gravity" - 4:48
11. "Biker in Business Class" - 4:29
12. "A Man on the Make" - 4:11
13. "Pascal et Caroline" - 6:41
14. "The Devil Drives" - 3:59
15. "Feelin' Kinda Sporty" - 3:11

== Personnel ==
=== Musicians ===
- Andy Baldwin - violin
- Rebecca Barnard - backing vocals
- Gordy Blair - bass, backing vocals
- Robin Casinader - piano, organ, violin, backing vocals
- Dave Graney - vocals, acoustic guitar
- Rod Hayward - guitar, backing vocals
- Clare Moore - drums, percussion, organ, vibraphone, vocals
- David Ruffy - sampler (programming, edits, loops)
- Liduina Van Der Sman - flute, backing vocals

=== Production details ===
Engineer - Kenny Jones Engineer Assistant - Sean Thompson Engineer - Andy Baldwin Mixer - David Ruffy Producer - Dave Graney, Clare Moore, David Ruffy Studio - Kiss, Melbourne (recording) Matrix Maison Rouge, London (Mixing)

=== Artwork ===
Cover art - Tony Mahony
