= Satellite (Australian band) =

Australian hard rock band

- Origin: Melbourne, Australia
- Genres: Hard rock
- Years active: 1993–1997
- Labels: Emmlos/Shock
- Past members: Bryce Ewing; Alex Fricke; Simon Granger; Graham Scott; Mia Stone

Satellite were an Australian hard rock band, formed in 1993 by Bryce Ewing on guitar, Alex Fricke on bass guitar, Simon Grainger on guitar, Graham Scott on drums and Mia Stone on lead vocals They released two studio albums, Wicked Wanda (1995) and Feed the Monster (1996) before disbanding in 1997.

== History ==
Melbourne band, Satellite were formed as a hard rock quintet in 1993 by Bryce Ewing on guitar, Alex Fricke on bass guitar, Simon Granger on guitar, Graham Scott on drums (ex-Models) and Mia Stone on lead vocals. Stone had been performing in the local music scene since the mid-1980s. She was the lead singer of Pizza Sluts, in July 1984, with Lindsay Brunsdon on drums (also in Ku Klux Frankenstein), Dave Dog on saxophone (ex-End Result), Dave Jetson on guitar and Iggy Stewart on bass guitar. Peter Tyrrell replaced Jetson on guitar. According to their sometime drummer and music journalist Ian McFarlane they provided "a jazzy brand of acid-grunge noise inspired by 1960s psychedelia and 1970s funk". The group broke up in January 1986. Stone's next band, Stone Circle included bandmates Jetson and Tyrrell together with Angela Chenoweth on bass guitar and Mark Costello on drums. This group were "playing modern acid rock" and released a single, "Fairground" in 1990 but disbanded in the following year. By that time Stone was working in Dirty Strangers, which Scott joined on drums in 1992.

McFarlane described Satellite's style, "hard-edged, gothic grunge rock". Their debut album, Wicked Wanda, was issued in July 1995, which was produced by Adam Calaitzis for Emmlos/Shock. The titular character was created by Stone as "[an] aggressive, ten-armed... subversive" version of Tank Girl. A comic book of Wanda's adventures, drawn by the album's cover artist and cartoonist Dillon Naylor, was included. Their second album, Feed the Monster, followed in November 1996. The group disbanded by 1997 with Stone turning to solo and side projects. One of Stone's projects, Michaela, had the singer teamed with Hugo Race (ex-the Wreckery), where she provided her "operatic blues voice backed by samples of Euro-classical music, electronic loops" and Race's guitar and organ. Ewing and Granger were members of the Stubble Band in early 2000s.

== Members ==
- Bryce Ewing – guitar
- Alex Fricke – bass guitar
- Simon Grainger – guitar
- Graham Scott – drums
- Mia Stone – vocals

== Discography ==
=== Albums ===
- Wicked Wanda (July 1995) – Emmlos/Shock (EMMLOS2)
- Feed the Monster (1996) – Emmlos/Shock (EMMLOS3)
