= Ezra Lee (musician) =

Australian musician (born 1986)

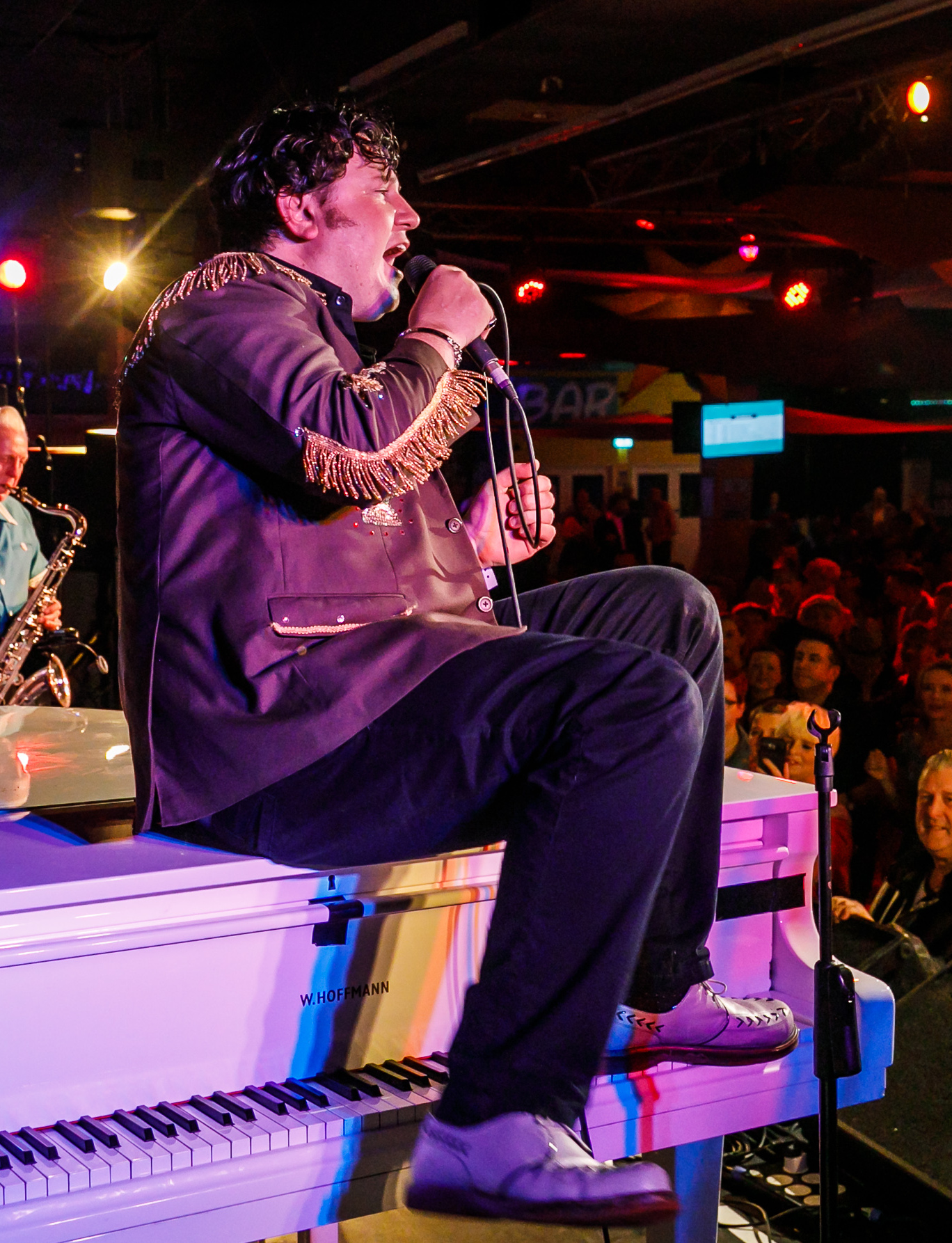
- Ezra Lee, Rhythm Riot, Camber Sands, UK, 2019

Background information
- Born: Ezra Lee Matzenik; 15 October 1986 (age 39); Tamworth, New South Wales, Australia
- Genres: Rockabilly; rhythm 'n' blues; blues
- Occupations: Singer-songwriter, musician
- Instruments: Vocals, piano
- Years active: 1999–present
- Labels: Preston, Rhythm Bomb

Ezra Lee (né Matzenik; 15 October 1986) is an Australian singer-songwriter and pianist.

== Biography ==
Ezra Lee, was born on 15 October 1986, in Tamworth, New South Wales. His father, Ed Matzenik, taught him to play piano at the age of four. Lee later used his father's record collection to learn boogie woogie and barrelhouse piano styles. Lee took blues lessons from Dr John and Johnny 'B. Goode' Johnson when they toured Australia, and developed his own piano style within these genres.

At age 14, Lee joined Johnny Green's Blues Cowboys and toured with them for six years. In 2009, Melbourne rockabilly label, Preston Records, released two of Lee's albums, Out of the Valley and You Can't Stop a Freight Train. In May 2010, Lee travelled to Barcelona, Spain to perform at the Screamin' Rockabilly Festival to support Bill Haley's Original Comets.

In November–December 2010 and February 2011, Lee performed in The Ultimate Rock 'n' Roll Jam Session, a musical theatre show with James Blundell, Nick Barker, Dave Larkin and Doug Parkinson. On 22 April 2011, Lee performed at the Viva Las Vegas Rockabilly Weekend in the US, supporting Jerry Lee Lewis.

In 2012, Lee recorded Ca$hed Up n Crazy ín Maitland, NSW. Lee performed in the UK and Europe. His next album, Coal Fired Man, was recorded in Berlin for Rhythm Bomb Records. In March 2013, Lee and his band opened, and were the backing band, for the "Queen of Rockabilly", Wanda Jackson, on her six date Australian tour.

In 2014, Lee moved to Melbourne, Victoria and joined the Australian rock group The Heatbrokers which features Van and Cal Walker, guitarist Jeff Lang and drummer Ash Davies. Ezra also recorded the albums Motor Head Baby (2015) and Boomerang Boogie (2016) on Rhythm Bomb records.

In 2018 Lee toured Europe and performed at the Rockin' Race Jamboree and was reviewed by John Howard in the May/June edition of Vintage Rock Magazine. In 2019 Melbourne record label Cat House Music released Copy Cat Killer - A Tribute To Jerry Lee Lewis and in May 2020 Ezra Lee released the country album Cryin'At The Wheel feat. Red Rivers, Jeff Lang and Gary Young (Daddy Cool), Paulie Bignell (The Detonators), Andy Scott and Steve Williams (John Farnham Band).

== Discography ==
=== Studio albums ===
- Preston Rockabilly #2 – Out of the Valley (split album, separate tracks by Ezra Lee, Pat Capocci Combo, and Danny [Wegryzn] and the Cosmic Tremors) (28 February 2009) – Preston Records
- You Can't Stop a Freight Train (April 2009) – Preston Records
- Ca$hed Up 'n' Crazy (2012) – Edjumacation Records
- Coal Fired Man (14 December 2012) – Rhythm Bomb Records (Germany)
- Motor Head Baby (Ezra Lee with Firebird Trio and Hank Elwood Green) (2014)
- Boomerang Boogie (2016)
- Copycat Killer (2019) - Cat House Music
- Cryin' At The Wheel (2020) - Cat House Music

=== Other appearances ===
- Delinquent Beat by Pat Capocci (2010) – Preston Records, guest appearance
- Rockabilly Comp – It's a Gas! (compilation album, 2010) – Preston Records
- Rockabilly Comp – Viva Las Vegas Rockabilly Weekend – The Sounds of Sin City (2011) – VLV Rockabilly Weekend Records
- Rockabilly Comp – Let's Talk About a Party – 32 Sleazy Tunes to Party Around the World (2012) – Rhythm Bomb Records (Germany)
- Rockabilly Comp – Graveland Jamboree (2012) – Rhythm Bomb Records
- Hank Green's Blues (2012) – Edjumacation Records
- Lost and Dangerous by Paulie Bignell and the Thorbury Two (2014) – Hailstone Studios, guest appearance
- Underbilly #2 (2014)
- Joel Sutton Rhythm & Blues Revue (with Vika Bull) (2019) - Lonesome Belle Music
