= Anthony Morgan (comedian) =

Australian actor, writer and stand-up comedian

Anthony Morgan is an Australian actor, writer and stand-up comedian. Morgan has performed his conversational stand-up style comedy across Australia as well as London, Manchester and twice at the Edinburgh Fringe Festival. Morgan began working in television in 1991 as a regular on The Big Gig and guest appearances on Hey Hey It's Saturday and Tonight Live with Steve Vizard. In 1994-1995 he made guest appearances on Denton as the roving Melbourne correspondent.

== Career ==
Morgan started his career as a comedian in 1982.

After a hiatus from 1998 to 2015, Morgan has appeared in the TV shows Randling, Problems, Ronny Chieng: International Student, and Rosehaven.

== Television ==
- Randling
- Problems
- Rosehaven (2016)
- Ronny Chieng: International Student (2017)
