= Andrew Denton's Interview =

- Genre: Talk show
- Created by: Andrew Denton; Jon Casimir
- Presented by: Andrew Denton
- Country of origin: Australia
- Original language: English
- No. of seasons: 2
- No. of episodes: 23 (List of episodes)

Production
- Production location: NEP Studios Sydney
- Running time: 60 minutes
- Production company: Legacy Media

Original release
- Network: Seven Network
- Release: 17 April 2018 – 13 August 2019

Andrew Denton's Interview (also stylised as "interview") is an Australian talk show hosted by Andrew Denton and broadcast on the Seven Network from 17 April 2018. The series saw Denton sit down with celebrities and other notable individuals.

Following the conclusion of the second season, it was the decision of the team not to return for a third season.

== Series overview ==
Season	Episodes	Originally aired	
Season	Episodes	Season premiere	Season finale
1	17	17 April 2018	7 August 2018
2	16	23 April 2019	13 August 2019

== Episodes ==
=== Season 1 (2018) ===
No. overall	No. in Season	Original airdate	Guest(s)	Aus. Viewers
1	1	17 April 2018	Cate & Bronte Campbell and Robert Plant	661,000
2	2	24 April 2018	Mick Fanning and Ty & Molly Hallam	593,000
3	3	1 May 2018	Richard Roxburgh and Celeste Barber	514,000
4	4	8 May 2018	Cher and Ross Noble	471,000
5	5	15 May 2018	Daniel Johns	560,000
6	6	22 May 2018	Charlie Goldsmith & Shane "Shag" Hanrahan	552,000
7	7	29 May 2018	Magda Szubanski	673,000
8	8	5 June 2018	Gene Simmons & Jennifer Burge	423,000
9	9	12 June 2018	Rebecca Sharrock & Janice Lorraine	567,000
10	10	19 June 2018	Lily Allen & Rosie Batty	507,000
11	11	26 June 2018	Denise Scott & Tim Winton	599,000
12	12	3 July 2018	Guy Pearce & Tim Minchin	545,000
13	13	10 July 2018	Michelle Payne and Neil & Liam Finn	554,000
14	14	17 July 2018	Angela White & Dylan Alcott	501,000
15	15	24 July 2018	Alienor Le Gouvello & Troye Sivan	469,000
16	16	31 July 2018	Keith Urban	533,000
17	17	7 August 2018	Amanda Lindhout	528,000

=== Season 2 (2019) ===
No. overall	No. in Season	Original airdate	Guest(s)	Aus. Viewers
18	1	23 April 2019	Angry & Roxanne Anderson	610,000
19	2	30 April 2019	Casey Donovan	546,000
20	3	7 May 2019	Jacki Weaver & Priscilla Sutton	507,000
21	4	14 May 2019	Steve Martin / Martin Short	425,000
22	5	21 May 2019	Ralph & Kathy Kelly	455,000
23	6	28 May 2019	Jimmy Barnes	526,000
24	7	4 June 2019	Rebecca Gibney and Scott & Nicole Guerini	582,000
25	8	11 June 2019	Michael Caine	528,000
26	9	18 June 2019	Madonna & Lasey Dunaman / Felicia Foxx	449,000
27	10	25 June 2019	Dr Munjed Al Muderis	476,000
28	11	2 July 2019	Stephen Curry	472,000
29	12	9 July 2019	Jade Hameister	398,000
30	13	16 July 2019	Carl Barron	492,000
31	14	23 July 2019	Amanda Keller	575,000
32	15	6 August 2019	Jessica Mauboy	468,000
33	16	13 August 2019	Julie Bishop	741,000
