= Libbi Gorr =

Australian broadcaster

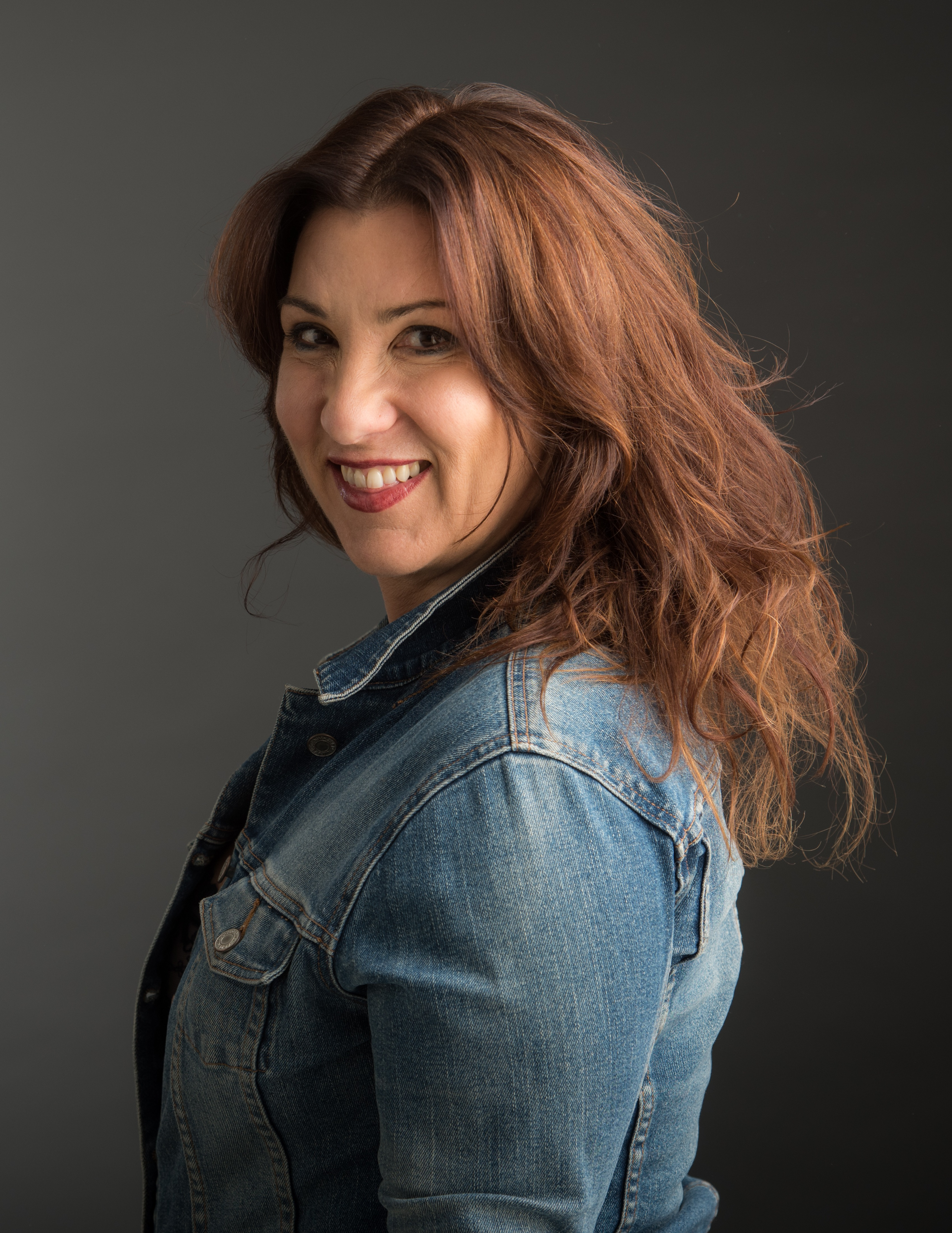
- Gorr in 2015
- Born: Lisbeth Joanne Gorr; 24 March 1965 (age 61); Melbourne, Victoria, Australia
- Education: Methodist Ladies College, Melbourne; University of Melbourne
- Occupations: TV personality; radio broadcaster; author; actress; voice artist
- Years active: 1988−present
- Known for: Character Elle McFeast
- Partner: Stewart Burchmore
- Children: Che, Dali
- Honours: Victorian Honour Roll of Women (2024)

Lisbeth Joanne "Libbi" Gorr (born 24 March 1965) is an Australian broadcaster working in both TV and radio. Gorr is also an author, voice artist, writer and performer. She first came to prominence with the satirical television character that she created called "Elle McFeast".

== Early life ==
Gorr was born in Melbourne into a Jewish Australian family grew up in Murrumbeena and was educated at the Methodist Ladies' College. She began working in comedy while she was an arts and law student at the University of Melbourne. Gorr graduated with a Bachelor of Arts and Bachelor of Laws in 1988. After graduation she became an articled clerk with the Melbourne law firm Phillips Fox. Gorr had her first regular media job as the voice of the Sportsgirl fashion chain when she was asked to "sound" like a photo of supermodel Elle Macpherson.

She also performed with the Hot Bagels, an all-women cabaret group.

== Television ==
As the character Elle McFeast, Gorr performed in a number of award-winning television shows, including Andrew Denton's Live and Sweaty. She hosted Live and Sweaty for another two years after Denton's retirement from the show in 1993, becoming the first woman to host a sports/comedy show in Australia.

In 1995, Libbi Gorr created McFeast: Live from the Bowels of Parliament House. This was a 30 minute weekly political satire/comedy show. The final credits featured Gorr dancing on the desks of Australian parliamentarians to "She's So Fine", by the Easybeats. It ran for two seasons.

As McFeast, Gorr also created 14 TV specials, including Breasts, Sex, Guys and Videotape, Portrait of a Power Pussy and the television show Elle McFeast Live. Gorr made the transition to appearing as herself on camera hosting the Marie Claire "What Women Want" forums, and the televised IF awards for film in Australia. In 2001 a portrait of her, entitled "Excelle – Libbi Gorr", by painter Margarita Georgiadis, was entered in the Archibald Prize for portraiture. The painting was hung as a finalist. A photographic portrait by Petrea Hicks was also hung the following year.

In 2003, she performed a live show "Dirty Sweet Cherry on Top!" at the Sydney Opera House

In 2007, Gorr hosted the short-lived Nine Network show The Catch Up. The program, a revised version of the American program The View, ran for only four months before being cancelled due to poor ratings. Gorr, however, received positive reviews.

Gorr has contributed to Studio 10 on Network Ten as a studio panellist and Melbourne correspondent.

In 2016, Gorr began presenting stories as a guest reporter for the ABC flagship current affairs program 7.30.

== Radio and journalism ==
In January 2012, Gorr joined ABC Radio Melbourne as host of the Sunday morning program. She also regularly hosted Breakfast when Red Symons was the main presenter and on leave.

In December 2021, Gorr announced her resignation from ABC Radio Melbourne to pursue her creative interests. Her last show on ABC Radio Melbourne was on 19 December 2021.

== Books ==
Gorr has authored two books for Harper Collins, The A–Z of Mummy Manners: An Etiquette Guide for Managing Other Children's Mothers and Assorted Mummy Dilemmas (2011) and The Bedtime Poem For Edible Children illustrated by Bradley Trevor Greive (2012).

== Personal life ==
Gorr's partner is freelance producer and director Stewart Burchmore (brother of actor Rhonda Burchmore). They have two children and live in Melbourne.
