= The Moodists =

Post-punk band from Australia

- Origin: Melbourne, Victoria, Australia
- Genres: Post-punk
- Years active: 1980–1987
- Labels: Au Go Go; Red Flame/Virgin; Creation Records; W. Minc
- Past members: Steve Carmen; Dave Graney; Clare Moore; Steve Miller; Chris Walsh; Mick Turner; David McClymont; Malcolm Ross

The Moodists were an Australian post-punk band. They were formed in late 1980 by Dave Graney on lead vocals, Clare Moore on drums and Steve Miller on guitar, all from punk group the Sputniks. They added bass guitarist Chris Walsh in early 1981, and in April 1983 added guitarist Mick Turner (ex-Sick Things, Fungus Brains). They issued their sole studio album, Thirsty's Calling, in April 1984. Turner left in January 1985 and the group disbanded in 1987.

== History ==
The Moodists were formed as a rock group in Melbourne late in 1980 after three members of Adelaide-based punk band, the Sputniks, had relocated there: Dave Graney on lead vocals, Clare Moore on drums, and Steve Miller on guitar; they were joined by Steven Carmen on bass guitar. The band were signed by Bruce Milne and Greta Moon to their Au Go Go label in 1981, and Carmen was replaced on bass guitar by Chris Walsh (ex-the Negatives).

The Moodists' debut single, "Where the Trees Walk Downhill", was issued in October 1981. It was followed by a second single, "Gone Dead", in June 1982, which was produced by Victor Van Vugt. A six-track EP, Engine Shudder, appeared in January 1983, co-produced by Van Vugt with Tony Cohen and Chris Thompson. It had been recorded at Richmond Recorders in Melbourne in the previous October; session saxophonists Nick Danyi and David Paliser each provided work on a track. In April of that year, Mick Turner on lead guitar (ex-Sick Things, Fungus Brains) joined. Australian musicologist Ian McFarlane felt Turner provided "his squalling guitar work to the band's unnerving, avant-garage rock noise."

In October 1983, the Moodists relocated to London at the behest of the Red Flame label, which had released an extended version of Engine Shudder with "Gone Dead" added. They recorded their only full album, Thirsty's Calling, with Van Vugt co-producing with the group. It was recorded and mixed at Livingstone Studios, London. Van Vugt had travelled from Melbourne with the band as their live sound mixer. The Moodists performed a John Peel session as the album came out.

Thirsty's Calling was issued in Australia on Virgin Records, and on Red Flame in the United Kingdom. McFarlane declared "[it] drew favourable reviews, although the fickle UK music press tended to harp on about The Birthday Party comparisons. Even such ludicrous descriptions as 'garage jazz-punk' only hinted at the band's powerful sound." They toured Europe and the United States before returning to Australia in November of that year. There they supported Public Image Limited on their 1984 tour of Australia, along with local punk band Box of Fish. Turner left the group to reform Fungus Brains. He would later become a founding mainstay of Dirty Three.

The Moodists' second EP, Double Life (1985), "contained tracks like the rumbling 'Six Dead Birds'." They returned to Australia for six months and then back to the UK. Another John Peel session was undertaken in that year; they then toured northern Europe and had a short US tour. They released a single through Creation Records, "Justice and Money Too", in August 1985. Session musicians included Mick Harvey on piano and Adam Peters on viola. McFarlane noticed that it "featured light, bluesy pop augmented with strings and piano."

The group released more music on the TIM label in 1986; these were co-produced by the band with Van Vugt. McFarlane opined that they "had toned down somewhat, the band had lost none of its ability to craft unique and compelling songs." By that time, Walsh had returned to Australia, and been replaced by David McClymont, previously a member of Scottish band Orange Juice. The Moodists' final gig was in London, with the line-up of Graney, Miller, Moore and McClymont, joined by Malcolm Ross, like McClymont also formerly of Orange Juice, on guitar.

After the Moodists disbanded in 1987, Graney, Moore and Ross formed the first of Graney's solo groups: Dave Graney with the Coral Snakes. This band also included Gordy Blair on bass guitar and Louis Vause on piano. They recorded an EP for Fire Records, which was produced by Barry Adamson.

In 2003, a compilation double CD, Two Fisted Art, was released on the W.Minc label – run by Miller with Graham Lee – and the band reformed for a limited number of live performances in Melbourne. Two Fisted Art featured one disc which collected most of the band's studio recordings; the second disc was live and unreleased material from 1982 in Melbourne and 1984 in London. In 2004, a DVD, The Moodists Live in London, of a performance recorded for British TV in 1984 was released by Umbrella Entertainment. The band were asked for new contributions, and reconvened for a filmed interview for the disc, as well as providing film of another, more raw performance at The Haçienda in Manchester.

== Discography ==
=== Albums ===
List of Albums
Title	Details
Thirsty's Calling	Released: April 1984; Label: Red Flame (RFA 39); Formats: LP, CS
Two Fisted Art (1980–1986)	Released: 2003; Label: W. Minc (WMINCD 027); Formats: 2×CD

=== Extended Plays ===
List of EPs
Title	Details
Engine Shudder	Released: 1983; Label: Au Go Go (ANDA 26); Formats: LP, CS; UK Indie #19
Double Life	Released: 1985; Label: Red Flame (RFM 44); Formats: LP, CS
Justice And Money Too	Released: 1985; Label: Creation Records; Formats: EP, Single; UK Indie #42
The Moodists	Released: 1987; Label: T.I.M. (12 MoT 5); Formats: LP, CS

== See also ==
- Dave Graney
- Dirty Three
