= Randling =

2012 Australian comedy TV series

- Genre: Quiz show
- Presented by: Andrew Denton
- Country of origin: Australia
- Original language: English
- No. of series: 1
- No. of episodes: 27

Production
- Running time: 27–35 minutes

Original release
- Network: ABC1
- Release: 2 May – 31 October 2012

Randling was an Australian comedic word-based television quiz show hosted by Andrew Denton. It aired on ABC1 at 8:30 on Wednesday nights, with the show repeated on Fridays on ABC2 at 11pm.

The show was hosted by Andrew Denton who posed questions to two teams of two guest panellists. The panellists included Merrick Watts, Julia Zemiro, Annabel Crabb, Jennifer Byrne, Rob Carlton, Angus Sampson, Robyn Butler, Genevieve Morris, Wendy Harmer, Dave O'Neil, Toby Schmitz, Benjamin Law, Heath Franklin, Felicity Ward, Toby Truslove, Anthony Morgan, David Marr, Jonathan Biggins, Chris Taylor and Michael Williams.

The guests competed in teams such as the Fitzroy Fireballs, The Southern Furies, Manchester & Haberdashery United, Northern Thrusters, The Argopelters, West Coast Odd Sox, The Bette Davis Cup Squad, Roget's Ramjets, The Ducks of War and The Help RC. The teams battled it out over 27 weeks to win the Randling trophy.

The show concluded on 31 October 2012 with The Fitzroy Fireballs, consisting of Dave O'Neil and Anthony Morgan winning the Grand Final defeating The Ducks of War, consisting of Heath Franklin and Felicity Ward.

The show did not return in 2013.
