= I Don't Care As Long As We Beat New Zealand =

Single by Andrew Denton and the Cast of Live and Sweaty
- Released: August 31, 1992
- Recorded: May−June 1992
- Studio: Trackdown Studio
- Length: 3:58
- Label: ABCTV Comedy, Festival Records
- Songwriter(s): Andrew Denton, Chris Harriot
- Producer(s): Chris Harriott

"I Don't Care As Long As We Beat New Zealand" is a song by Andrew Denton and the Cast of Live and Sweaty. The single was released in August 1992 peaked at number 38 on the ARIA Charts.

At the ARIA Music Awards of 1993 the song was nominated for the ARIA Award for Best Comedy Release.

== Track listing ==
CD/Cassingle (ABCTV Comedy – D 16041)

1. "I Don't Care As Long As We Beat New Zealand" - 3:58
2. "We Did Quite Well for a Country Our Size" - 4:03

== Charts ==
Chart (1992)	Peak position
Australia (ARIA)	38
