= Glenn Mitchell (sports broadcaster) =

Australian sports commentator

Glenn Mitchell (born 15 March 1963) is a former sports commentator and writer for the Australian Broadcasting Corporation

== Commentary career ==
He joined ABC Sport in Perth in January 1990.

He commentated at four Olympic Games – Atlanta 1996, Sydney 2000, Athens 2004, Beijing 2008 – principally calling cycling and co-hosted the coverage of the opening and closing ceremonies in Athens and Beijing.

He also commentated the track and field for ABC-TV at the 1996 and 2000 Summer Paralympics and worked on four Commonwealth Games – Kuala Lumpur 1998, Manchester 2002, Melbourne 2006 and Delhi 2010 – calling cycling and co-hosting the opening and closing ceremonies at each.

Mitchell commentated nearly 200 Test and limited overs cricket matches, covering 13 overseas tours to England, South Africa, India, Sri Lanka, New Zealand and the United Arab Emirates.

He was well known for his repartee on air with former Australian Test spinner, Kerry O'Keeffe.

Mitchell called over 900 AFL and WAFL Australian rules football games for the ABC on both television and radio and NBL and WNBL basketball on both mediums.

During his career with the ABC he commentated over 20 sports including world championships in cycling, water polo and triathlon.

Since leaving the ABC Mitchell has worked as a freelancer in the media commentating cricket on radio and television for the South African Broadcasting Corporation and Australian Football on radio stations 6PR and 6IX, as well as weekly appearances on Sky News and Mix 94.5 and a regular contributor to BBC Five Live. He is also a columnist for sports website, The Roar.

== Personal life ==
On 26 May 2011, Mitchell resigned from the ABC following a mental breakdown.

Since leaving the ABC he has conducted numerous mental health presentations around Western Australia calling on his own experiences to help remove the stigma associated with mental illness.

In 1998 he wrote Pursuing Excellence, a biography of Western Australia's sportswomen for the Women's Sport Foundation of Western Australia.

He was awarded the Australian Sports Medal by the Governor-General of Australia for services to sport in September 2000.

He is married to ABC Grandstand and television presenter, Karen Tighe. The couple have a son.
