= Nick Barker (Australian musician) =

Australian musician

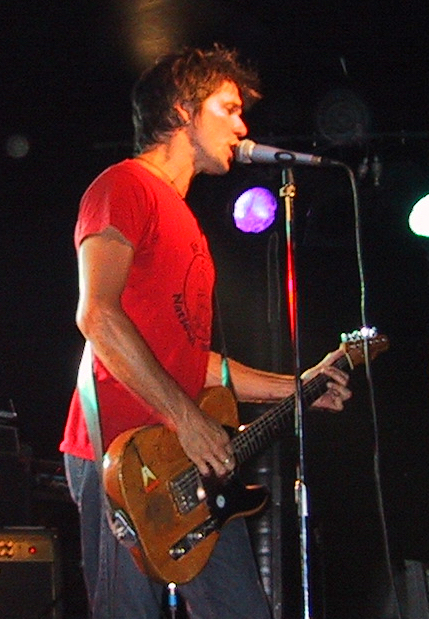
- On stage, Queensland, February 2003

Background information
- Born: Nicholas Paul Barker
- Origin: Melbourne, Australia
- Genres: Rock; blues; punk rock; power pop
- Occupations: Musician; singer-songwriter
- Instruments: Vocals; guitar; bass
- Years active: 1980–present
- Labels: White/Mushroom; Festival; Air; Golden Robot Records
- Formerly of: The Curse; Beachouse; Reptile Smile; Freak Power; the Wreckery; Hugo Race and the True Spirit; Mark Seymour and the Daydreamers; Nick Barker and the Reptiles; Barker; Nick Barker Band; the Heartache State
- Website: facebook.com/pages/Nick-Barker-and-The-Reptiles/279103542127590

Nicholas Paul Barker is an Australian singer-songwriter and guitarist who formed a rock, power pop band, Nick Barker & the Reptiles, in March 1988. Their cover version of Cockney Rebel's "Make Me Smile (Come Up and See Me)" reached the top 30 on the Australian Recording Industry Association (ARIA) Singles Chart in November 1989. They provided two top 40 albums on the related ARIA Albums Chart, Goin' to Pieces (1989) and After the Show (1991). He formed another group, Barker, in 1993, and their single, "Time Bomb", was listed at No. 20 on Triple J Hottest 100 for 1994. Barker then went solo from 1995.

== Biography ==
=== Early years ===
Nicholas Paul Barker left secondary school in the late 1970s and started an apprenticeship in a workshop. He was the bass guitarist for a succession of Melbourne-based bands, starting with the Curse during 1980–1981, and during the summer of 1982–1983 he played and recorded with Beachouse. Also in the Curse's line-up were Adrian Chynoweth on guitar, Nique Needles, John Rowell and Graeme Scott. He moved to Reptile Smile with Chynoweth and Nick Cross, Rick Hawkins and Tony Hawkins during 1983–1984, then Freak Power with Chynoweth, Needles and Scott, before joining the Wreckery, a rock and blues group, in December 1985.

The Wreckery had formed earlier in 1985 with Robin Casinader on drums, piano, Hammond organ, guitar and violin (ex-Plays with Marionettes, Horla), Edward Clayton-Jones on guitar, organ and vocals (ex-Fabulous Marquises, Plays with Marionettes, Horla, Nick Cave and the Bad Seeds), Tadeusz O'Biegly on bass guitar, Hugo Race on vocals and guitar (ex-Plays with Marionettes, Nick Cave and the Bad Seeds) and Charles Todd on saxophone, organ (ex-Wild Dog Rodeo, Cattletruck). Barker performed on their releases, Yeh My People (mini-album, 1986), Here at Pain's Insistence (1987), The Collection (compilation, 1988), and Laying Down Law (1988), but he had left early in 1988, before the latter appeared.

=== 1988-1993: Nick Barker & the Reptiles ===
Barker moved to lead guitar and lead vocals when he formed Nick Barker & the Reptiles, a rock, blues and power pop band in March 1988, with former bandmate Chynoweth on guitar, Drew Basford on bass guitar, and David Pinder on drums. They signed to Mushroom Records' White Label imprint. Their debut single, "Another Me" was released in December. Chris Harris joined the group on harmonica. Also during 1988 and 1989, Barker was a member of Hugo Race and the True Spirit and Mark Seymour and the Daydreamers on bass guitar.

Nick Barker & the Reptiles released their debut album, Goin' to Pieces, in August 1989, which peaked in the Australian Recording Industry Association (ARIA) Albums Chart at No. 35. It was co-produced by Jim Faraci (Femme Fatale), Mark Moffatt (Mental As Anything, Midnight Oil) and Chris Bailey (ex-The Saints). Penelope Layland of The Canberra Times observed, "Patchy production marrs this debut album from [the group]. Their music really relies on its rough and rude edge, and without it, loses much of its appeal... [it] is hardly a dismal failure, [they] just haven't quite come up with the goods. You can only make so many excuses for a debut album. After that it comes down to the fact that a patchy album costs just as much as a great one."

The band's cover version of Cockney Rebel's "Make Me Smile (Come Up and See Me)" reached the top 30 on the ARIA Singles Chart in November. They undertook a touring schedule with 200 performances a year on the national pub rock circuit. Australian musicologist, Ian McFarlane, described how "[their] sassy brand of commercial rock'n'blues found immediate acceptance... [by] becoming one of the archetypal Oz Rock pub bands of the era." In 1990 Matthew Heydon joined on keyboards and Marc Scully (ex-Love Rodeo, Deadly Hume) replaced Basford on bass guitar.

Their second album, After the Show was released in March 1991, was produced by Los Angeles-based, Joe Hardy (Steve Earle, Tom Cochrane), which peaked at No. 33. McFarlane opined, "it was a diverse collection of songs, ranging from tough rock'n'roll and bar-room boogies to ballads." The Canberra Times' John Lilley felt, "they have well and truly strayed from the norm by not only promptly releasing a second album but making it a worthy one as well... [their] sound has not been forcefully smoothed out beyond recognition in the recording studio. Their enthusiastic live sound has been allowed to seep through."

None of After the Show's three singles charted in the top 50. "Out in the Open" appeared in February 1992 and was followed by an extended play, Loose, in April. Its tracks were used as fill music on the TV program Nine's Wide World of Sports.

After a hiatus and overseas travel, Barker returned to Melbourne and disbanded the Reptiles in 1993.

=== 1993-1995: Barker ===
In 1993, Barker formed Barker with ex-Reptile Heydon, and Venom Brown on drums (ex-Massive Appendage), Tim Henwood on guitar and Anthony Ragg on bass guitar (ex-Kings of the Sun). They released three singles and an album, Happy Man, in 1994 and followed with Son of Happy Man EP in 1995. Of their singles, "Time Bomb", was voted No. 20 on Triple J Hottest 100 list for 1994.

=== 1996-present: Solo career ===
Barker's solo career started with the album 1996 album Damn Mermaids!. His backing band were Lincoln Jones on bass guitar and Craig Whitelock on drums.

In 1997, Barker branched into acting roles, including minor appearances in TV series Blue Heelers and Pizza, and appearing in a role in feature film Amy, alongside Rachel Griffiths, produced by David Parker and Nadia Tass. He also penned and performed songs for its soundtrack, which included work by Ed Kuepper, Lamb and Philip Judd, (ex-Split Enz).

Barker released his second solo album, Annie Get Your Guru in 1999.

In 2001 Barker released, Returned Service; acoustic tracks culled from live performances in Adelaide and Melbourne. Australian music journalist Ed Nimmervoll observed "[he] can stand in front of an audience with his acoustic guitar and simply perform song after song, songs from his past or recent songs. No need for all the industry trappings... Songs about real life, things he's done, seen and thought, stripped back versions of songs you'll be familiar with ('Miles to Go', 'Time Bomb', 'Imogen'), and rarer songs." He had signed to Croxton Records, an imprint co-founded by former Weddings Parties Anything front man, Mick Thomas. Barker became popular in Brazil, and released Sanctuary – Best of there in 2002.

In 2003, he released Backyard Six, featuring a musical response to the Bali bombings, "Plait Your Hair". In 2005 Barker re-did his earlier songs as part of the Liberation Blue Acoustic Series on C-sides.

In addition to his own recording and touring commitments, Barker has produced young Adelaide rock act Southpaw. Barker has written tracks, recorded and performed with Mark Seymour (Hunters & Collectors), Paul Kelly, and You Am I front man, Tim Rogers. Matt Heydon of the Reptiles went on to Jimmy Barnes' band, Marc Scully later joined Ratcat, and Tim Henwood of Barker later joined the Superjesus and the Androids. Barker toured with Rogers, including to the United Kingdom and Europe; he toured in Jimmy Barnes' band for the New Zealand leg of the In the Heat of Night tour, during 2006–07.

In November and December 2010 and the following February, Barker performed in a musical theatre show, The Ultimate Rock 'n' Roll Jam Session, with James Blundell, Dave Larkin, Ezra Lee and Doug Parkinson.

In March 2011 Barker played at the Whorouly Hotel Beer Garden to mark the first of its type in the revitalised pub. Barker's band comprised Michael Barclay on drums, Alan Brooker (ex-Paul Kelly and the Dots) on bass guitar, and Justin Garner on lead guitar. It was organised by Troy Wood and publicans Graham Wood and Jennifer Garrett. According to Geelong-based music critic Rokdog (Chris Nicholls), it was an early contender for 2011 gig of the year. During July of that year, he took the lead role of Bon Scott in a musical, Hell Ain't a Bad Place to Be – The Story of Bon Scott, premiering at Melbourne's Athenaeum Theatre.

In 2014, Barker fronted the Heartache State, a group formed with Garner and Brown. They released a self-titled album in March 2015. In September 2017 they issued their second album, Last of the Buffalo on Golden Robot Records. Barker observed, "It really feels like a band now, loose but with a lot of spirit. Making it was easy and fun, and that's what playing music was always supposed to be… we love the bloody thing!!!"

In 2023, Barker released a new album called Exoskeleton through Golden Robot. The single was Chinese Burn. Barker has been touring recently with James Reyne and Boom Crash Opera nationally.

== Discography ==
=== Studio albums ===
List of studio albums, with release date, label, and Australian chart positions shown
Title	Details	Peak chart positions
Title	Details	AUS
as Nick Barker & the Reptiles
Goin' to Pieces	Released: August 1989; Label:White Label Records/Mushroom Records (L30097, D30097, C30097); Formats: CD, LP, cassette	35
After the Show	Released: March 1991; Label:White Label Records/Mushroom Records (L30513, D30513, C30513); Formats: CD, LP, cassette	33
as Barker
Happy Man	Released: September 1994; Label: Mushroom Records (D31226); Formats: CD	57
as Nick Barker
Damn Mermaids!	Released: August 1996; Label: White Label Records/Mushroom Records (D31592); Formats: CD	144
Annie Get Your Guru	Released: 1999; Label: Air Recordings (air 5); Formats: CD	-
Backyard Six	Released: 2003; Label: Croxton Records (croxt017); Formats: CD	-
C-sides	Released: 2005; Label: Liberation Blue (BLUE077.2); Formats: CD; Note: Liberation Blue Acoustic Series	-
Black Water Blues	Released: February 2009; Label: Hired Goon Records; Formats: digital download	-

=== Live albums ===
List of live albums, with release date and label shown
Title	Details
as Nick Barker
Returned Service – Live Acoustic Album	Released: 2001; Label: Croxton Records (croxt008); Formats:

=== Compilation albums ===
List of compilation, with release date and label shown
Title	Details
as Nick Barker
Sanctuary – Best of	Released: 2002 (Brasil); Label: Tronador Music (TMSS21-2); Formats: CD

=== Extended plays ===
List of EPs, with release date and label shown
Title	Details
as Nick Barker & the Reptiles
Loose	Released: April 1992; Label: Mushroom Records (D11121); Formats: CD
as Barker
Son of Happy Man	Released: 1995; Label: Mushroom Records (D11981); Formats: CD

=== Singles ===
List of singles, with year released, selected chart positions, and album name shown
Title	Year	Peak chart positions	Album
Title	Year	AUS	Album
as Nick Barker & the Reptiles
"Another Me"	1988	67	Goin' to Pieces
"(Sure Beats) Goin' to Pieces"	1989	87	Goin' to Pieces
"Make Me Smile (Come Up and See Me)"	1989	30	Goin' to Pieces
"Resurrection Time"	1990	86	Goin' to Pieces
"Won't Get You Loved"	1991	53	After the Show
"Can't Hold on"	1991	84	After the Show
"Miles to Go"	1991	103	After the Show
"Out in the Open"	1992	81	Loose
as Barker
"Heard So Much About You"	1994	88	Happy Man
"World's a Peach"	1994	-	Happy Man
"Time Bomb"	1994	-	Happy Man
as Nick Barker
"Imogen"	1996	167	Damn Mermaids!
"Someone Like You"	1996	-	Damn Mermaids!
"By Your Side (Mr Popular)"	1997	-	Amy (soundtrack)
"Thylacine"	1999	-	Annie Get Your Guru
"Where I Wanna Be" (with Felicity Urquhart)	2021	-	
