= Hugo Race =

Australian musician and record producer

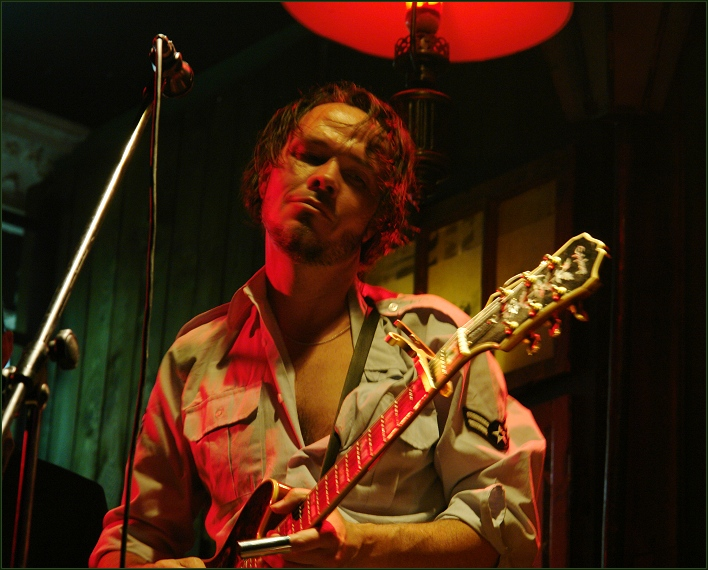
- Race performing in Zielona Góra, Poland, May 2006

Background information
- Born: Hugo Justin Race; May 1963 (age 62); Melbourne, Australia
- Genres: Alternative rock, blues rock
- Occupation(s): Musician, singer-songwriter, producer, screenwriter
- Instrument(s): Vocals, guitar
- Years active: 1978–present
- Labels: Normal, Pandemonium, Roadshow/PolyGram, Glitterhouse, Spooky, Darla, Rampant
- Website: www.hugoracemusic.com

Hugo Justin Race (born 23 May 1963) is an Australian rock musician and record producer who had been based in Europe from 1989 to 2011. He was a member of Nick Cave and the Bad Seeds (1983–85), and The Wreckery (1984–89) with Nick Barker and Robin Casinader. As from October 2013 he was simultaneously a member of Hugo Race and the True Spirit, Hugo Race Fatalists, and Dirtmusic. True Spirit have released 12 albums. Race returned to live in Australia in 2011.

== Life and career ==
Hugo Justin Race was born in the early 1960s in Melbourne and grew up in an Anglo-Irish family. His father listened to musical theatre and classical music, his mother played piano, he has brothers and a sister. In 1978 he formed Dum Dum Fit as the lead vocalist and guitarist with Robin Casinader on keyboards. Two years later Race and Casinader formed Plays with Marionettes which also included Edward Clayton-Jones on guitar, organ, and vocals (ex-The Fabulous Marquises) and Nick Seymour on bass guitar.

Australian musicologist, Ian McFarlane, described their sound as "aggravating style of jazzy no-wave noise", although they developed a local following on the "inner-city/Crystal Ballroom circuit". In 1982 they issued a shared single with their track, "Witchen Kopf", backed by a track from the group, People with Chairs up Their Noses. Another track, "Hellbelly", appeared on a various artists album, This Is Hot, in 1984. It was co-written by Race and Casinader, however by February 1984 the band had separated.

Late in 1983 Race on guitar joined Nick Cave on lead vocals (ex-The Birthday Party) in his new band, Nick Cave: Man or Myth?. By mid-1984 Cave's backing band were renamed The Bad Seeds and had issued their debut album, From Her to Eternity. The title track was co-written by Race and Cave with bandmates Barry Adamson, Blixa Bargeld, Mick Harvey, and Anita Lane. The group toured the United States, United Kingdom and the rest of Europe, during the European leg Clayton-Jones joined The Bad Seeds temporarily replacing Bargeld.

Late that year Race and Clayton-Jones returned to Melbourne to form The Wreckery, as a blues, rock band. By January 1985 the line up included Race, Casinder (also on drums), and Clayton-Jones with Tadeusz O'Biegly on bass guitar; and Charles Todd on saxophone and organ (ex-Wild Dog Rodeo, Cattletruck). McFarlane described the group as "inner-city angst kings [which] proffered a lurching brand of gutbucket St Kilda blues by way of the Mississippi delta. It was a fiery sound totally unique in Australia at the time". Race was described as "enigmatic, petulant ... whose bleak visions stabbed at the heart of the human condition".

The group recorded their debut five-track extended play, I Think this Town is Nervous, which was issued by Hot Records in December 1985. By that time O'Biegly had been replaced by Nick Barker on bass guitar (ex-Curse, Reptile Smile). Race wrote the majority of the group's material. They issued two studio albums, Here at Pains Insistence (August 1987) and Laying Down Law (October 1988), before they disbanded by mid-1989.

While a member of The Wreckery, in 1987, Race co-wrote the screen play for Ghosts... of the Civil Dead (December 1988), a feature film directed by John Hillcoat, which starred Cave and Dave Mason (of The Reels) in their debut acting roles. Back in 1986 Race had a minor role, Pierre, in Dogs in Space, which was directed by Richard Lowenstein and starred Michael Hutchence and Saskia Post. In 1988 Race had his own starring role as the titular character of Mack the Knife who is a "sociopath"; the film was released as In Too Deep (1989). The Canberra Times reviewer described Race's character as "a drifting crim plotting the next route to easy money" but felt that the film "degenerates into a collection of characters in search of an ending".

Also during 1987 Race, Barker and Casinader recorded as The True Spirit with guest musicians Bryan Colechin on bass guitar, John Murphy on percussion, and Chris Wilson on harmonica. A track, "Certified Fool", appeared on a various artists' album, Melbourne Stuff. The same recording sessions resulted in the debut album by Hugo Race & The True Spirit, Rue Morgue Blues, which appeared in June 1988 on the Rampant Records (for Australian market) and Normal Records (for German market). The album was engineered by John Phillips (of not drowning, waving) and produced by Race.

Late in 1989 Race relocated to Europe, initially to London then living in Berlin, Germany. In 1990 he issued Earls World under the moniker, The True Spirit. He was joined in the studio by Alex Hacke on guitar and slide guitar (of Einstürzende Neubauten); Chris Hughes on tabla (of Slub); John Molineux on harmonica; Rainer Lingk on banjo, guitar and bass guitar; and Thomas Wydler on drums (both of Die Haut). Race used a similar line up to record his next album, Second Revelator (1991), with additional work by former bandmate Harvey (of The Bad Seeds) on piano, organ, bass guitar, backing vocals, percussion and as producer.

To promote the album Race used The True Spirit line up of Casinader, Clayton-Jones, Colechin and Hughes (now on drums). They toured Australia in December 1991 and released the album there in January the next year on Survival Records. They toured Australia again in February 1993 and followed with another album, Spiritual Thirst. With Race in the studio were Colechin, Hughes, Molineux and Ralf Droge on trombone and keyboards; Race also produced the album.

In 1995 the group released Valley of Light on the German label, Glitterhouse and, in February the next year, on the Australian label, Roadshow Music. It included a cover version of Captain Beefheart's "Clear Spot". The album was co-produced by Race with Tony Cohen. The next album, Wet Dream, which appeared in June 1997, was described as "industrial-trance-blues", by UK magazine, Melody Maker. By 1998 Race was living in Italy, he toured Australia first as a solo artist and then at the end of the year with The True Spirit.

In 1999 Race set up his own production base, Helixed, which incorporated diverse side-projects including the Italian-based Sepiatone, an "atmospheric electronic/acoustic project" with Marta Collica (ex-Mice Vice); the Zürich-based, Transfargo (RecRec Music, Switzerland) with Dimitri de Perrot which issued an album, Mil Transit (2003); and a Sicilian-based multimedia project, Merola Matrix (Desvelos Records, Sardinia). He has also produced Italian artists such as Cesare Basile and Nove Rose. In January 2000 he worked with Australian singer, Mia Stone (ex-Stone Circus, Satellite) and her group, Michaela.

In 2001 Race issued a compilation 2× CD album, Long Time Ago, which contained material by The True Spirit from 1988 to 1999. He had a minor role as the Vampire Bass Player in Michael Rymer's film Queen of the Damned (February 2002). In 2007 he joined Chris Brokaw (ex-Codeine) and Chris Eckman to issue the album, Dirtmusic. In 2010 he formed Hugo Race Fatalists with Antonio Gramentieri and Diego Sapignoli from the Italian instrumental band, Sacri Cuori. They released two albums: Fatalists (Interbang/Gusstaff, 2010) and We Never Had Control (Interbang/Gusstaff, 2012). In 2011 he returned to live in Australia. As from October 2013 Race was simultaneously a member of Hugo Race and the True Spirit, Hugo Race Fatalists, and Dirtmusic.

== Discography ==
Hugo Race is credited with: vocals, guitars (lead, rhythm, bass), sequencers, samplers, keyboards, saxophone, congas, Moog synthesiser, Hammond organ, producer.

The Wreckery

- Yeh My People (1987)
- Here at Pains Insistence (1987)
- Laying Down Law (1988)
- Past Imperfection (2008)

Nick Cave & The Bad Seeds

- From Her to Eternity (1984)
- Kicking Against the Pricks (1986)
- Tender Prey (1988)
- Murder Ballads (1996)
- The Best of Nick Cave & The Bad Seeds (1998)
- B-Sides & Rarities (2005)

Lilium

- Felt (2010)

Hugo Race & The True Spirit

- Rue Morgue Blues (June 1988)
- Earls World (1990)
- Second Revelator (1991)
- Spiritual Thirst (1993)
- Valley of Light (1995)
- Wet Dream (June 1997)
- Chemical Wedding (1998)
- Last Frontier (1999)
- Long Time Ago (compilation album, 2001)
- The Goldstreet Sessions (2003)
- Live in Monaco (2004)
- Ambuscado (2005)
- Taoist Priests (2006)
- 53rd State (2008)
- Live in Wołów Jail (2009)
- Live in Brussels (2015)
- The Spirit (2015)
- Starbirth/Stardeath (2020)

Solo

- Stations of the Cross (Limited Release) (1994)
- The Merola Matrix (2004)
- Fatalists (2010)
- Between Hemispheres (2011)
- No But It's True (2012)
- Dishee (2021)

DirtMusic

- DirtMusic (2007)
- In the Desert (Live) (2008)
- BKO (2010)
- Troubles (2013)
- Lion City (2014)
- Bu Bir Ruya (2018)

Sepiatone

- In Sepiatone (2001)
- Darksummer (2004)
- Echoes On (2011)

Transfargo

- Mil Transit (2003)

Hugo Race & Fatalists

- We Never Had Control (2011)
- Orphans – EP (2014)
- 24 Hours to Nowhere (2016)
- Taken by the Dream (2019)
- Onceuponatimeinitaly (2022)

Hugo Race & Michelangelo Russo

- John Lee Hooker's World Today (2017)

Catherine Graindorge & Hugo Race

- Long Distance Operators (2017)
