= Problems (TV series) =

Problems is an Australian television comedy series starring Sam Simmons. The series premiered on 21 November 2012 on ABC.

== Cast ==
- Sam Simmons as Sam
- Lawrence Mooney as Mooney
- Ronny Chieng as Mr Meowgi
- Anthony Morgan as Morgan
- Claudia O'Doherty as Claudia
- David Quirk as Dave
- Gary Sweet as Mr Moth
- Susie Porter as Mrs Moth
- Reg Gorman as Ron
- Doug Bayne as Brian
- Sue Jones as Claudia's mum
- Kate McCartney
- Laura Hughes

== Episodes ==
- Episode 1: Taco Night
- Episode 2: Bus Crush
- Episode 3: First Hot Day
- Episode 4: The Cardboard Angel

== See also ==
- List of Australian television series
- List of programs broadcast by ABC (Australian TV network)
