= Enough Rope =

Australian television interview show

- Also known as: Enough Rope with Andrew Denton
- Created by: Andrew Denton, Anita Jacoby
- Presented by: Andrew Denton
- Country of origin: Australia
- Original language: English

Original release
- Network: ABC1
- Release: 17 March 2003 – 8 December 2008

Related
- Elders with Andrew Denton (2008–2009)

Enough Rope with Andrew Denton (often shortened to Enough Rope) is a television interview show originally broadcast on ABC1 in Australia. The title of the show came from the phrase "give someone enough rope and they'll hang themselves".

The program was the brainchild of Australian comedian, social critic, producer and media personality Andrew Denton, who hosted the show. The hour-long chat show aired from 2003 to 2008.

== Overview ==
The show was based around in-depth interviews Denton held with a celebrity or person of note, usually before a studio audience. Many high-profile guests would comment on Denton's meticulous research in interview preparation.

In addition to celebrities, Denton's interviewees have included people who are perceived to have extraordinary life stories or to hold interesting professions. An occasional feature of the show was "Show & Tell", in which Denton interviewed members of the studio audience, who revealed unusual stories about themselves.

The show initially competed against the Nine Network's Micallef Tonight in the Monday 9:30 pm timeslot, and critics have claimed that Enough Rope's high ratings forced Nine to axe their program. Throughout 2004 and 2005 Enough Rope continued to dominate, averaging well over a million viewers weekly. At the beginning of both 2007 and 2008, the series began with several More Than Enough Rope specials, a series that revisited interviews with past guests along with behind the scenes footage. In 2008, the series had a series of interviews with people who are of 'older age', and these interviews were re-titled Elders with Andrew Denton instead of the usual 'Enough Rope' banner. Elders also aired in 2009. The show also included three 'On the Road' specials in which Denton travelled to a small country town and interviewed some of the local residents about their lives and experiences. The towns which the show visited were Rainbow, Victoria (2006), Mount Isa, Queensland (2007) and Kununurra, Western Australia (2008).

In an interview with The Sydney Morning Herald in October 2008, Denton announced that the 2008 season would be the last. He claims to have ended the show because he thought "It's a good time to finish." and saw his television future behind the camera. In a 2018 interview he said it was because he believed more of his guests were putting on an act instead of being themselves.

== Notable guests ==
Some of the high-profile international guests that appeared on the show include former U.S. President Bill Clinton, David Attenborough, Al Gore, Jerry Seinfeld, Jim Carrey, Bob Geldof, Antonio Banderas, Helen Mirren, Bono, Dave Grohl, Dr Jane Goodall, Elton John, Crown Princess Mary of Denmark, Angelina Jolie, Clint Eastwood, Mel Brooks, and Michael Parkinson. Denton sometimes flew to international destinations to conduct his interviews.

On a local level, comedian Dave Hughes opened up about what led him to give up alcohol, and lifestyle television pioneer Don Burke shed some light on the axing of his show, Burke's Backyard. A highly publicised interview with disgraced footballer Wayne Carey conducted in the weeks after a series of controversies drew in a television audience of 1.5 million viewers. Other Australian guests of note include Bernie Banton, Russell Crowe and Tim Minchin and Kevin Bloody Wilson.

Enough Rope was at the centre of political controversy in 2005 due to a controversial interview with former ALP opposition leader Mark Latham which almost did not make it to air (Latham was also interviewed for Lateline). In 2004, Denton interviewed the controversial anti-immigration figure from Australian politics, Pauline Hanson, who argued that she was not a racist.

For the final program, aired on 8 December 2008, the guests were Ben Stiller and Wendy Whiteley.

== See also ==
- List of Australian television series
- Publication of Latham's Diaries and public appearances
