= Denton (talk show) =

Australian television show

Denton is an Australian hour-long live late night talk show and interview program hosted by the eponymous Andrew Denton. It aired on the Seven Network between 1994 and 1995. Regular guests included Amanda Keller and Bobcat Goldthwaite. Anthony Morgan had a recurring role as the roving Melbourne correspondent. Andrew won the 'Most Popular Comedy Personality' Logie Award in 1996, for his role in Denton
