= Live and Sweaty =

1991 sports Australian TV series

- Genre: Panel show
- Created by: Andrew Denton
- Presented by: Andrew Denton (1991–93); Elle McFeast (1994)
- Country of origin: Australia
- Original language: English
- No. of seasons: 4

Original release
- Network: ABC Television
- Release: 22 March 1991 – 14 December 1994

Live and Sweaty is an Australian sports television program, broadcast on the ABC from 1991 until 1994. Hosted by Andrew Denton (and later Elle McFeast), the show was part panel-based, part talk show and part comedy, and predated The Footy Show which has a similar format.

== Live and Sweaty regulars ==
Andrew Denton was the show's host, and this was Denton's third series for the ABC (after Blah Blah Blah and The Money or the Gun). Comedian Libbi Gorr (in her Elle McFeast persona) was a roving reporter, panellist and eventual host of the show when Denton left in 1993.

Other regular panel members were actor Lex "The Swine" Marinos (always introduced with a Zorba the Greek style musical theme), Triple J presenter Debbie "Skull of Rust" Spillane, former NRL player Rex "The Moose" Mossop, and Peter "Crackers" Keenan. A sports news segment was presented by ABC sportscaster Karen Tighe.

== Notable stunts ==
In 1992, Denton challenged the Prime Minister of Australia, Paul Keating, to a game of ten-pin bowling. Keating made no comment, but Denton continued to up the ante over the course of the year, protesting outside Parliament House and organising petitions urging the Prime Minister to accept the challenge. Keating eventually relented, not to the game, but appeared in a live interview with Denton.

In the lead up to the 1992 Summer Olympics, Denton and the rest of the regular cast of the show recorded the song "I Don't Care As Long As We Beat New Zealand" parodying the sporting rivalry between Australia and New Zealand. It was released as a single and reached #38 on the Australian charts.

== Discography ==
=== Singles ===
Title	Year	Peak chart positions
Title	Year	AUS
"I Don't Care As Long As We Beat New Zealand" (with Andrew Denton)	1992	38

== Awards and nominations ==
=== ARIA Music Awards ===
The ARIA Music Awards are a set of annual ceremonies presented by Australian Recording Industry Association (ARIA), which recognise excellence, innovation, and achievement across all genres of the music of Australia. They commenced in 1987.

Year	Nominee / work	Award	Result	Ref.
1993	"I Don't Care As Long As We Beat New Zealand"	Best Comedy Release	Nominated	

== See also ==
- List of Australian television series
