= Elle McFeast =

Fictional character on Australian television

Elle McFeast is an Australian television character created by comedian Libbi Gorr. The character appeared in several shows during the 1990s, beginning with the ABC series Live and Sweaty in 1991. The character became the host of the show in 1993. This was followed by her own chat show in 1995 called McFeast Live.

Gorr made a series of ABC specials as McFeast, including Breasts, My Big Bottom and Power Pussy, during which she interviewed Australian politicians, sports personalities and celebrities. In 1994, she won a gold medal at the New York Festival of Television for Sex, Guys and Videotape.

== Awards and nominations ==
=== ARIA Music Awards ===
The ARIA Music Awards are a set of annual ceremonies presented by Australian Recording Industry Association (ARIA), which recognise excellence, innovation, and achievement across all genres of the music of Australia. They commenced in 1987.

Year	Nominee / work	Award	Result	Ref.
1997	Breasts	Best Comedy Release	Nominated	
