= Karen Tighe =

Australian sports journalist

Karen Anne Tighe (pronounced "tie") is a former Australian Broadcasting Corporation radio and television sports presenter. She grew up and was educated in Sydney, and completed a Bachelor of Arts in communications and psychology at Macquarie University. She joined the ABC sports department as a television reporter and presenter in 1989. In 1997 she moved to ABC radio as the anchor of the ABC Radio Grandstand sports program.

Tighe has covered various sports and sporting events including the Paralympic Games in Barcelona, Atlanta, Lillehammer, and Sydney. She also reported at the Kuala Lumpur Commonwealth Games and the Hopman Cup.

In the early 1990s, she was a panel member on the Friday night ABC television show Live and Sweaty where she presented a news segment.

In 2003, she married fellow sports presenter Glenn Mitchell and relocated to Perth, Western Australia from where she has worked for the ABC, providing ABC television sports reporting as well as presenting the Grandstand show. The couple have a son.

In March 2020, she was hospitalised after a bout of herpesviral encephalitis and due to lengthy recovery from resulting severe short-term memory loss, she has not subsequently taken part in sports broadcasting. In February 2024, she announced her retirement from the ABC to focus on her health.

She is the first person to have won the Sport Australia Awards (Media Award) twice, in 2000 and 2001. In 2000, Tighe was awarded the Australian Sports Medal for "many years outstanding service to the Paralympic movement". In February 2020, she received a Sport Australia Lifetime Achievement Award.
