= Not Enough Rope =

Australian musical group

Background information
- Origin: Perth, Western Australia, Australia
- Genres: Folk, rock
- Years active: 1994 - 2001
- Members: Matt Galligan; Matt Kealley; Todd Lynch; Michael D. Lane; Steve Bow
- Website: Official website

Not Enough Rope was a five-piece folk-rock band from Perth, active from 1994 to 2001.

== Biography ==
Not Enough Rope was founded in 1994 at the Kalamunda Hotel in Perth, Western Australia. The group added two members and put on performances, supporting Things of Stone and Wood in 1995 and performing on stage with Jewel.

The name Not Enough Rope was inspired by a frayed rope clothesline.

Their 2001 album Paying Off My Radials album features a cover of The Triffids' "Wide Open Road".

Matt Kealley joined acoustic folk rock band, Jigger, and, Todd Lynch and Michael D. Lane formed King Brown and Shanks Pony. Michael performs and facilitates music.

== Members ==
- Matt Galligan - vocals, acoustic guitar, mandolin
- Matt Kealley - drums, percussion, harmonica, vocals
- Todd Lynch - accordion, piano organ, didgeridoo
- Byron Mavrick - lead guitar (original member)
- Adrian Conti - bass, acoustic guitar, mandolin (original member)
- Mike Lane - bass, acoustic guitar, mandolin
- Steve Bow - sound guy

== Discography ==
=== Albums ===
- Fingerpistol (1998)
- Paying Off My Radials (2001)

=== EPs ===
- I'll Tell You When I See You (May 1996)AUS #97

=== Singles ===
- "My Way" (24 May 1998)
