= Clare Moore =

Australian musician

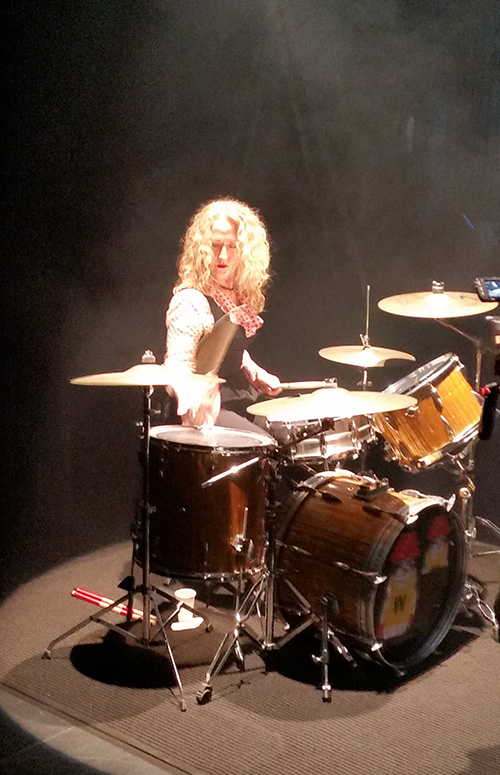
Clare Moore at Her Majesty's Theatre in 2018

Clare Christina Moore is an Australian musician, songwriter, arranger, producer and performer whose principal instrument is the drums. She has also performed as a keyboard player, singer and vibraphone player. Moore writes and performs with songwriter and performer Dave Graney, involved in various bands including The Moodists, Dave Graney 'n' the Coral Snakes, the Dave Graney Show, the Lurid Yellow Mist featuring Dave Graney and Clare Moore and Dave Graney & the mistLY.

She also wrote, sang and performed and released an album as part of The Dames, a band she formed with Kaye Louise Patterson (piano). Since 2018, she was in The Routines, a band with Jane Dust, Emily Jarrett and Will Hindmarsh.

== History ==
Moore began performing in 1974, playing drums at school and at Rock Mass, in Adelaide. One of her teachers in this time was the noted musician and nun Sister Janet Mead. The Moodists first recorded two singles and a 12"EP for Au Go Go Records in Melbourne. She went to the UK in October 1983 after being signed by Red Flame Records. She also toured extensively in Europe and the USA. The Moodists returned to Australia in 1985 after a short tour of the US to tour nationally opening for Public Image Ltd. The Moodists then returned to the UK and released a 12"single on Creation Records. With David McClymont - formerly of Postcard Records band Orange Juice - joining on bass, they released two further EPs on Tim records. The band lineup at their end in late 1986 was Clare Moore on drums, David McClymont on bass, Steve Miller on guitar and Dave Graney on vocals. In 1987, singer Dave Graney decided to pursue a solo career and, with Moore as his music director, formed Dave Graney and The Coral Snakes and recorded an EP for Fire Records produced by Barry Adamson before returning to Australia in late 1988. In Melbourne in the following five or six years they worked with Universal Records, for whom they recorded four albums, then continued independently with Dave Graney & the mistLY and also releasing albums and performing as Dave Graney and Clare Moore.

In 1994 Moore played drums and provided backing vocals on most of the tracks for former Go-Between Robert Forster's solo album I Had A New York Girlfriend - a collection of cover versions. In 2024 the album was re-issued under a new title Beautiful Hearts.

Moore also played drums in Harry Howard and the NDE for three albums and the Routines.

Moore released her debut solo album The Third Woman in 2001.

In 2005, there was also the double album Hashish and Liquor with Graney. Working with Graney, Moore co-wrote the soundtrack to the Tony Martin film Bad Eggs.

Other soundtrack work includes various ABC documentaries, the short film Ray by Tony Mahony, and the features made by Donna McRae, Johnny Ghost and Lost Gully Road.

In 2010, Moore worked on the Arts Centre project about Australian female musicians called Rock Chicks.

In 2011, Clare Moore composed and recorded the theme for TV series A Quiet Word With .... by Tony Martin.

== Discography ==
=== Studio albums ===
List of studio albums, with selected chart positions and certifications
Title	Album details	Peak chart positions
Title	Album details	AUS
The Third Woman	Released: 2001; Label: Chapter Music (CH35); Formats: CD	-
Hashish and Liquor (with Dave Graney)	Released: 2005; Label: Reverberation (REV018); Formats: 2×CD, digital	-
Keepin' It Unreal (with Dave Graney)	Released: 2006; Label: Reverberation (REV029); Formats: CD, digital	-
We Wuz Curious (As The Lurid Yellow Mist featuring Dave Graney and Clare Moore)	Released: June 2008; Label: Illustrious Artists (IARLP 204); Formats: CD, digital	-
The Dames (as The Dames)	Released: April 2013; Label: Wolverine Enterprises; Formats: compact disc and digital	-
Let's Get Tight (with Dave Graney)	Released: 2017; Label: Cockaigne (COCK55); Formats: CD, digital	-
One Million Years DC (with Dave Graney)	Released: 2019; Label: Cockaigne; Formats: digital	-
Everything Was Funny (with Dave Graney)	Released: October 2021; Label: Cockaigne (COCK70); Formats: CD, digital	-
In a mistLY (with Dave Graney)	Released: November 2022; Label: Wolverine Enterprises; Formats: compact disc and digital	-
(strangely) (emotional) (with Dave Graney)	Released: April 2024; Label: Formats: CD, digital	-
I Passed Through Minor Chord in a Morning (with Dave Graney)	Released: November 2024; Label: Cockaigne; Formats: digital	–

=== Soundtracks ===
List of live albums, with selected chart positions and certifications
Title	Album details	Peak chart positions
Title	Album details	AUS
Bad Eggs (with Dave Graney)	Released: July 2003; Label: Liberation Music (LIBCD5077.2); Formats: CD	-
Johnny Ghost (with Dave Graney)	Released: 2011; Label: Cockaigne; Formats: digital	-
Lost Gully Road (with Dave Graney)	Released: 2017; Label: Cockaigne; Formats: digital	-

=== Live albums ===
List of live albums, with selected chart positions and certifications
Title	Album details	Peak chart positions
Title	Album details	AUS
Point Blank (with Dave Graney and Mark Fitzgibbon)	Released: April 2015; Label: Wolverine Enterprises; Formats: digital	-
Live in Hell (with Dave Graney, Stu Thomas and Stuart Perera)	Released: April 2015; Label: Wolverine Enterprises; Formats: digital	-
In Concert (with Dave Graney and Robin Casinader)	Released: May 2020; Label: Wolverine Enterprises; Formats: digital	-
"the Dove" Valentino (with Dave Graney and Malcolm Ross)	Released: August 2020; Label: Wolverine Enterprises; Formats: digital	-
Lyve At Byrds (with Dave Graney and the mistLY)	Released: February 2022; Label: Cockaigne; Formats: digital; Note: Recorded on 8 November 2019 at Bird's Basement, Melbourne	-

== Awards and nominations ==
=== ARIA Music Awards ===
The ARIA Music Awards are a set of annual ceremonies presented by Australian Recording Industry Association (ARIA), which recognise excellence, innovation, and achievement across all genres of the music of Australia. They commenced in 1987.

Year	Nominee / work	Award	Result	Ref.
2003	Music from the Motion Picture – Bad Eggs (Dave Graney and Clare Moore)	Best Original Soundtrack Recording	Nominated	

=== Australian Women in Music Awards ===
The Australian Women in Music Awards is an annual event that celebrates outstanding women in the Australian Music Industry who have made significant and lasting contributions in their chosen field. They commenced in 2018.

Year	Nominee / work	Award	Result	Ref.
2023	Clare Moore	Lifetime Achievement Award	Awarded	
