= Andrew Denton =

Australian television producer, comedian and host

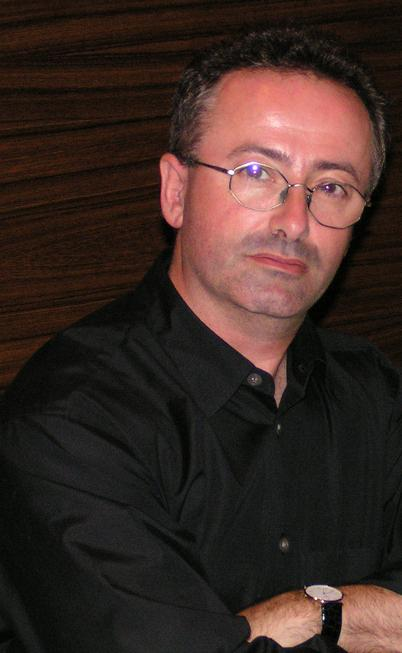
- Denton in 2004
- Born: 4 May 1960 (age 66); Sydney, Australia
- Occupations: Television presenter; producer; writer; radio personality; comedian
- Spouse: Jennifer Byrne

Andrew Christopher Denton (born 4 May 1960) is an Australian television producer, comedian, Gold Logie–nominated television presenter and former radio host, and was the host of the ABC's weekly television interview program Enough Rope and the ABC game show Randling. He is known for his comedy and interviewing technique. He is also responsible for introducing the troupe of The Chaser to Australian audiences.

== Early life ==
Denton is the son of Kit Denton, writer and the author of the novel The Breaker, about Australian soldier Breaker Morant. He went to Roseville Public School in Sydney, before attending Blue Mountains Grammar School in Wentworth Falls. In 1977 he attended Guildford Grammar School in Perth. He then studied at Mitchell College of Advanced Education (MCAE) (now Charles Sturt University) in Bathurst, and graduated with a Bachelor of Arts in communications in 1982. He was involved in the campus radio station, 2MCE.

== Career ==
=== Radio ===
Denton worked on Australian radio stations early in his media career, beginning as a writer for radio presenter Doug Mulray on Triple M Sydney. He had an early involvement in the Sydney Theatresports movement.

Denton worked as a morning radio host for the Triple M in Sydney. His time on Triple M included the House From Hell reality TV program, in which various contestants were placed in a house together and involved in various stunts, tricks and tortures. Denton has said in radio interviews that he regrets being involved in the program due to the unacceptable level of human manipulation.

=== Television ===
Denton made his first television appearance as an extra on the ABC television series The Investigators, and progressed to being a member of the team that was runner-up on the Australian improvised comedy show Theatresports in 1987.

Between 1988 and 1995 he hosted the TV shows Blah Blah Blah (1988), The Money or the Gun (1989–1990), Live and Sweaty (1991–1995), all on ABC-TV, as well as a comedy talk show, Denton (1994–1995), which aired on Seven Network. These shows were talk-based. Live and Sweaty focused on sports and was panel-based.

Each week on The Money or the Gun, Denton had a musical guest play a cover version of Led Zeppelin's "Stairway to Heaven" in a different musical style, usually the genre of the guest's own musical style.

Robert Plant and Jimmy Page, musicians from Led Zeppelin, later appeared on Denton to perform a Rolf Harris song. (Harris performed a notable version of "Stairway to Heaven", with wobble board solo.) Denton saw the beginning of the Musical Challenge segment, and challenged musical guests to perform a song from a barrel full of well-known songs. This segment evolved during his time on Triple M, resulting in three albums, with tracks including Tina Arena singing Cold Chisel's "Cheap Wine", The Wiggles singing AC/DC's "It's a Long Way to the Top", Neil Finn performing Marvin Gaye's "Sexual Healing", James Reyne performing Kate Bush's "Wuthering Heights", Barenaked Ladies performing Prince's "When Doves Cry", and Paul Kelly performing Prince's "Little Red Corvette". Three volumes were released on CD titled Andrew Denton's Musical Challenge. In the early 1990s, Denton was the first guest programmer on Rage.

Denton appeared as a contestant on the Nine Network's Sale of the Century.

While presenting his talk show Denton, he launched a public subscription scheme to hire a bounty hunter to capture fugitive businessman Christopher Skase, who was attempting to avoid extradition to Australia at the time. He had a cameo appearance in the Australian film Let's Get Skase.

In 2003, Denton began hosting Enough Rope with Andrew Denton. He was executive producer and script editor for ABC's The Election Chaser and CNNNN. In an audience development survey in 2004, respondents named Denton as one of the "most liked and recognisable" personalities on Australian television. Enough Rope ended in late 2008. Also in 2003, Denton provided the narration for the ABC TV animated documentary series Human Contraptions.

Asked about the best skill an interviewer can bring to the job, Denton said: "Research, clearly. Listening, obviously. And leaving myself open to the possibility it won't go the way I expect."

In 2009, Denton hosted the second season of Elders, a series of interviews with ageing notable Australians. After this series finished, Denton took a few years off being in front of the camera and spent more time behind the scenes. In 2012, he returned to hosting duties, to ABC's game show, Randling.

In 2014, Denton appeared on the SBS TV program Who Do You Think You Are?, tracing his Jewish family line to Poland, as well as to Meir Katzenellenbogen. He visited the Treblinka extermination camp and contemplated what his fate might have been had his grandfather not moved to England.

In 2018, Denton hosted Interview, produced by Legacy Media for the Seven Network.

=== Film ===
Denton's first feature-length documentary, God on My Side, documents his visit to the National Religious Broadcasters Convention. It was first shown at the Sydney Film Festival in June 2006 with plans to show it as a TV special on ABC's Enough Rope. It was screened in Australian cinemas from 2 November 2006. Denton insists he is not anti-Christian.

In 2011, Denton served as executive producer on the crowd-funded horror film The Tunnel. The film was directed by Carlo Ledesma, co-written, co-produced and co-edited by Julian Harvey and Enzo Tedeschi, and produced with Denton's production company Zapruder's Other Films.

=== Stage ===
Denton appeared as Malcolm Turnbull in the Belvoir Street Theatre production of A Royal Commission into the Australian Economy, written by John Clarke and Ross Stevenson, and participated in the early years of the ABC's World Series Debating.

=== Production ===
Zapruder's Other Films is a production company founded in 1989 by Denton, Anita Jacoby, and Peter Thompson. The company was named for Abraham Zapruder, the man who filmed the assassination of President John F. Kennedy. Works produced by the company include:

- CNNNN (2002–2003)
- David Tench Tonight (2006)
- Enough Rope (2003–2008)
- The Gruen Transfer (2008–present)
- Elders (2008–2009)
- 30 Seconds (2009)
- Hungry Beast (2009–2011)
- Gruen Nation (2010)
- The Tunnel (2011)
- AFP (2011)
- The Joy of Sets (2011)
- Randling (2012)

In early 2012, Zapruder merged with Cordell Jigsaw to form CJZ and, in June 2013, Denton sold his share of the company at the same time he announced that he was quitting television.

=== Literature ===
Denton accompanied Tony Horwitz on portions of his research for the book Spying on the South, and is a character in the narrative.

== In popular culture ==
In 2022 Tasmanian band 208L Containers released an album, A Night at the Mirage, which they described as "a concept album about Andrew Denton and Christopher Skase".

== Personal life ==
Denton lives in Sydney. He and his wife, TV presenter Jennifer Byrne, have a son. He is a supporter of the South Sydney Rabbitohs. Denton is also an atheist. In 2017, Denton was diagnosed with advanced heart disease, and he underwent a successful triple bypass surgery.

== Discography ==
=== Compilation albums ===
| Title | Details | Certification |
|---|---|---|
| The Andrew Denton Breakfast Show Musical Challenge | Released: 2000; Label: Columbia | ARIA: Gold |
| The Andrew Denton Breakfast Show Musical Challenge 2: Even More Challenged! | Released: 2001; Label: Columbia | |
| Triple M Musical Challenge 3 – Third Time Lucky! | Released: 2002; Label: Columbia | |

=== Singles ===
| Title | Year | Peak chart positions |
| Title | Year | AUS |
|---|---|---|
| "I Don't Care As Long As We Beat New Zealand" (with the cast of Live and Sweaty) | 1992 | 38 |

== Awards and nominations ==
=== ARIA Music Awards ===
The ARIA Music Awards are a set of annual ceremonies presented by Australian Recording Industry Association (ARIA), which recognise excellence, innovation, and achievement across all genres of the music of Australia. They commenced in 1987.

| Year | Nominee / work | Award | Result | Ref. |
|---|---|---|---|---|
| 1993 | "I Don't Care As Long As We Beat New Zealand" | Best Comedy Release | Nominated | |

=== Logie Awards ===
Denton has been involved with the Logie Awards since the 1990s. He was the host of the awards ceremony in 1999 and 2000. Denton was nominated for several Logie awards:

- The Gold Logie Award for Most Popular Personality on Australian Television in 2008 and 2009, for his role in Enough Rope
- The "Most Popular Light Entertainment Personality" award in 1994 and 1995, for his roles in Live and Sweaty and Denton
- The "Most Popular Comedy Personality" award in 1996, for his role in Denton
- The "Most Popular Presenter" award in 2005, 2008 and 2009, for his role in Enough Rope
