= The Wreckery =

- Origin: Melbourne, Australia
- Genres: Rock; blues
- Years active: 1985–1989; 2008
- Labels: Rampant; Citadel

The Wreckery are an Australian punk blues group which formed in 1985 in Melbourne. The founding members were Hugo Race on vocals and guitar, Robin Casinader on drums, piano, Hammond organ, guitar and violin, Edward Clayton-Jones on guitar, organ and vocals, Tadeusz O'Biegly on bass guitar, and Charles Todd on saxophone and organ. Within a year, Nick Barker had replaced O'Biegly on bass guitar. The band issued two studio albums, Here at Pain's Insistence (August 1987) and Laying Down Law (1988), before disbanding in mid-1989. In 2008, they briefly reunited in support of a compilation album, Past Imperfect.

== History ==
The Wreckery were formed in January 1985 in Melbourne by Robin Casinader on drums, piano, Hammond organ, guitar and violin (ex-Plays with Marionettes, Horla); Edward Clayton-Jones on guitar, organ and vocals (ex-Fabulous Marquises, Plays with Marionettes, Horla, Nick Cave and the Bad Seeds); Tadeusz O'Biegly on bass guitar; Hugo Race on lead vocals and guitar (ex-Plays with Marionettes, Nick Cave and the Bad Seeds) and Charles Todd on saxophone and organ (ex-Wild Dog Rodeo, Cattletruck).

Mark Deming of AllMusic opined that they were "One of the more important bands on the Australian post-punk scene of the 1980s, Melbourne's the Wreckery played dark, atmospheric music informed by the blues and the same sort of chemical and cultural obsessions as their contemporaries Nick Cave and the Bad Seeds." Australian musicologist, Ian McFarlane, observed that they were "Led by the enigmatic, petulant Hugo Race, whose bleak visions stabbed at the heart of the human condition, [the group] defied conventional approaches to plough a deep furrow of dark romantic melodrama."

Casinader and Race had been bandmates in Dum Dum Fit (1978), before forming Plays with Marionettes with Clayton-Jones. Clayton-Jones and Race with both members of Nick Cave and the Bad Seeds. In early April 1985, the Wreckery recorded their debut five-track mini-album, I Think This Town Is Nervous (Hot Records, December), at Melbourne's Dex Studios. Nick Barker (ex-Curse, Reptile Smile) had replaced O'Biegly on bass guitar.

During 1986, the group's concerts were broadcast on ABC-TV's Edge of the Wedge and on SBS-TV's The Noise. In April of that year, they recorded their second EP, Yeh My People (Rampant Records, January 1987). The EP provided their single, "No Shoes for This Road". According to McFarlane, "Race wrote the bulk of the band's material, although one of the standout tracks on Yeh My People was Clayton-Jones' tremulous 'Overload'." Deming observed that "like its precursor, [it] did well on the Australian indie charts and helped the band become a frequent presence on the touring circuit."

The Wreckery issued their first full-length studio album, Here at Pain's Insistence, in August 1987, via Rampant Records. The group produced it with Bruce Johnson as audio engineer. Andree Coelli of The Canberra Times interviewed Todd, who explained "It's a good progression from the last album, the songs are probably better defined, not so much in style and music, but the songwriting is maturing. It's not the same for every track, there are some twisted songs and some not-so-twisted songs." McFarlane felt it "was a consolidation of the band's thematic approach." In November, the album provided a single, "Everlasting Sleep", which McFarlane found was "beguiling".

A four-track EP, Ruling Energy, appeared in February 1988, which McFarlane opined displayed "four more slices of moody, rough-shod R&B." The group followed with a compilation album, The Collection, in October on Rampant Records. However the label was "having financial problems" and the Wreckery signed with Citadel Records to release their second studio album, Laying Down Law, in October, which had been preceded by the single, "Good to Be Gone", in August.

Deming preferred the second album, which is "regarded by many as the group's strongest work." Barker, Clayton-Jones and Todd had all left soon after the album was recorded, in early 1988. Deming noted that "tensions within the band, exaggerated by touring and health issues, came to a head, and by the time Laying Down the Law was released, the Wreckery had already chosen to split up after a brief tour." During 1988, Casinader shifted over to guitar and keyboards while they added two new members: Brian Colechin on bass guitar (ex-Marching Girls) and John Murphy on drums (ex-News, Whirlywirld, Associates, Slub). After the tour, in mid-1989, the Wreckery disbanded.

In August 2008, Casinader and Race reformed the group to release a 2× CD album, Past Imperfect, with a tour of the east coast in support.

== Discography ==
=== Studio albums ===
- Here at Pain's Insistence (14 August 1987) – Rampant Records
- Laying down Law (1988) - Citadel Records
- Fake Is Forever (2023)

=== Compilation albums ===
- The Collection (October 1988) – Rampant Records
- Past Imperfect (August 2008) – Memorandum Recordings

=== Extended plays ===
- I Think This Town Is Nervous (December 1985) – Hot Records (HOTM4)
- Yeh My People (January 1987) – Rampant Records (MLRR012)
- Ruling Energy (February 1988) – Rampant Records

=== Singles ===
- "No Shoes for This Road" (1987)
- "Everlasting Sleep" (1987)
