= Robin Casinader =

Robin Romesh Casinader is an Australian composer, arranger, and multi-instrumentalist.

He has been a member of many bands including Plays with Marionettes with Hugo Race, the Wreckery with Race and Nick Barker, and Dave Graney and the Coral Snakes. He has also performed and written music for his solo projects and bands which have included Hood (which featured Pearly Black) and The Vanishing Lady.

His two solo albums have featured other musicians singing the majority of the lead vocals: Chris Wilson provided vocals for All This Will Be Yours and Pearly Black was the featured singer on Useful Tunes.

Robin featured in the 2002 film Queen of the Damned as a Vampire Pianist. He worked as violin coach to lead actor Stuart Townsend and some of his music features in the soundtrack (although not on the soundtrack album).
