= Mystify: A Musical Journey with Michael Hutchence =

Compilation album by Michael Hutchence
- Released: 5 July 2019
- Recorded: Various
- Studio: Various
- Genre: Rock
- Length: 59:24
- Label: Petrol; Universal Music
- Producer: Chris Murphy; Mark Edwards

Michael Hutchence chronology
Michael Hutchence (1999)	Mystify: A Musical Journey with Michael Hutchence (2019)

Singles from Mystify: A Musical Journey with Michael Hutchence
- 1. "Spill the Wine" Released: 24 May 2019; 2. "Please (You Got That ...)" Released: 27 June 2019

Mystify: A Musical Journey with Michael Hutchence is a compilation album by Australian recording artist Michael Hutchence. The album was released by Petrol Records and Universal Music Group on 5 July 2019, on CD, cassette, vinyl and digital formats. It features several INXS songs and unreleased recordings including several tracks with dialog. The album was released as a complementary recording to the 2019 documentary film, Mystify: Michael Hutchence.

== Singles ==
On 24 May 2019, a cover of Eric Burdon & War's "Spill the Wine" was released as the album's lead single. The song was the fourth most added song to Australian radio in the week following its release.

On 27 June 2019, a new version of "Please (You Got That ...)" credited to INXS and Ray Charles was released as the album's second single. The track was originally recorded in Charles' studio in Los Angeles and released as a single in December 1993 from the band's ninth studio album Full Moon, Dirty Hearts. The new version includes in-studio banter between Hutchence and Charles.

== Track listing ==
All tracks performed by INXS, except where noted. All tracks written by Andrew Farriss and Michael Hutchence, except where noted.

Mystify: A Musical Journey with Michael Hutchence track listing
No.	Title	Writer(s)	Length
1.	"Let It Ride" / "Deliver Me" (demo)		2:57
2.	"Black & White"		2:32
3.	"Need You Tonight" (live 1988)		1:21
4.	"Under My Thumb" (Michael Hutchence with the London Symphony Orchestra)	Mick Jagger; Keith Richards	2:22
5.	"Please (You Got That ...)" (studio outtake)		4:14
6.	"What You Need"		3:27
7.	"Don't Change"	Garry Gary Beers; A. Farriss; Jon Farriss; Tim Farriss; Hutchence; Kirk Pengilly	0:55
8.	"Spill the Wine" (Michael Hutchence)	Charles Miller; Howard E. Scott; B.B. Dickerson; Lonnie Jordan; Harold Ray Brown; Thomas "Papa Dee" Allen; Lee Oskar	3:35
9.	"Move On"		3:36
10.	"Need You Tonight"		3:37
11.	"Devil Inside"		1:53
12.	"Love Is (What I Say)"	Beers; Anthony Braxton-Smith; A. Farriss; J. Farriss; T. Farriss; Hutchence; Pengilly	2:08
13.	"Baby Don't Cry"	A. Farriss	4:38
14.	"All I'm Saying" (Michael Hutchence)	Hutchence; Tim Simenon	3:18
15.	"Shine Like It Does"		3:08
16.	"Burn for You"		3:02
17.	"Viking Juice"		1:46
18.	"Kiss the Dirt (Falling Down the Mountain)"		3:11
19.	"Original Sin"		4:10
20.	"Never Tear Us Apart" (Michael Hutchence, Mylène Farmer and INXS)		3:44
Total length:			59:24

== Charts ==
Chart performance for Mystify: A Musical Journey with Michael Hutchence
Chart (2019)	Peak position
Australian Albums (ARIA)	28

== Release history ==
Release history for Mystify: A Musical Journey with Michael Hutchence
Country	Date	Format	Label	Catalogue
Australia	5 July 2019	CD, digital download, 2×LP	Petrol	7790168 / 7790172
Europe, Japan	5 July 2019	CD, digital download, cassette	UMC	
Europe, Japan	30 August 2019	2×LP	UMC	
Japan	6 September 2019	2×LP	UMC	
