= Please (You Got That ...) =

1993 single by INXS

Single by INXS

from the album Full Moon, Dirty Hearts
- Released: 15 November 1993
- Studio: Capri Digital (Capri, Italy)
- Length: 3:05
- Label: EastWest
- Songwriters: Andrew Farriss; Michael Hutchence
- Producers: Mark Opitz; INXS

INXS singles chronology
"The Gift" (1993)	"Please (You Got That ...)" (1993)	"Time" (1994)

Music video
- "Please (You Got That ...)" on YouTube

"Please (You Got That ...)" is a song by Australian rock band INXS, released in November 1993 by Eastwest Records as the second single from their ninth studio album, Full Moon, Dirty Hearts (1993). The song was written by Andrew Farriss and Michael Hutchence and features guest vocals by American singer, songwriter and pianist Ray Charles. In June 2019, a new version of the song was released as the second single from the 2019 documentary film Mystify and lifted from the soundtrack, Mystify: A Musical Journey with Michael Hutchence.

== Background ==
When Ray Charles arrived to sing his part, Michael Hutchence was there in the studio to teach him how to produce the Hutchencesque vocal style. "Mr. Charles," Michael respectfully addressed him, "... it (the melody) goes like this ... (Michael sings the line and Ray Charles attempts to imitate it). After many attempts Charles says, "Sir (Michael), I know I will eventually get it right" ... and of course he did.

== Critical reception ==
Larry Flick from Billboard magazine wrote, "Now here's an offbeat pairing. How 'bout Aussie rock act INXS with legendary bluesman Charles, as interpreted by Chicago's Eric "E-Smoove" Miller? Believe it or not, the chemistry is unmistakable. Domestic release comes on the heels of huge import action, which can only help unlock a few of the bolted doors the band has met at pop radio in recent times."

== B-sides ==
The B-sides on the first of two UK CD single releases include a remix of "Please (You Got That ...)", an extended mix of "Freedom Deep" from the Full Moon, Dirty Hearts album and a live performance of "Communication" from Welcome to Wherever You Are, which was recorded in Santa Monica, California, on the Get Out of The House tour.

== Track listings ==
- CD1
1. "Please (You Got That ...)"
2. "Please (You Got That ...)" (main edit)
3. "Freedom Deep" (extended 12-inch mix)
4. "Communication" (live)
- CD2 and 12-inch single
1. "Please (You Got That ...)" (Club Need mix)
2. "Please (You Got That ...)" (Needful dub mix)
3. "Please (You Got That ...)" (Downtown dub mix)
4. "Please (You Got That ...)" (Downtown instrumental mix)
- Cassette single
1. "Please (You Got That ...)"
2. "Freedom Deep" (extended 12-inch mix)

== Charts ==
Chart (1993–1994)	Peak position
Australia (ARIA)	37
Iceland (Íslenski Listinn Topp 40)	10
Netherlands (Dutch Top 40 Tipparade)	17
New Zealand (Recorded Music NZ)	46
UK Singles (OCC)	50
UK Airplay (Music Week)	40
US Dance Club Songs (Billboard)	9

== Release history ==
Region	Date	Format(s)	Label	Ref.
Australia	15 November 1993	CD	EastWest	
United Kingdom	29 November 1993	12-inch vinyl; CD; cassette	Mercury	
Japan	25 January 1994	CD	EastWest Japan	
