= Hughie Green =

English actor and TV personality (1920–1997)

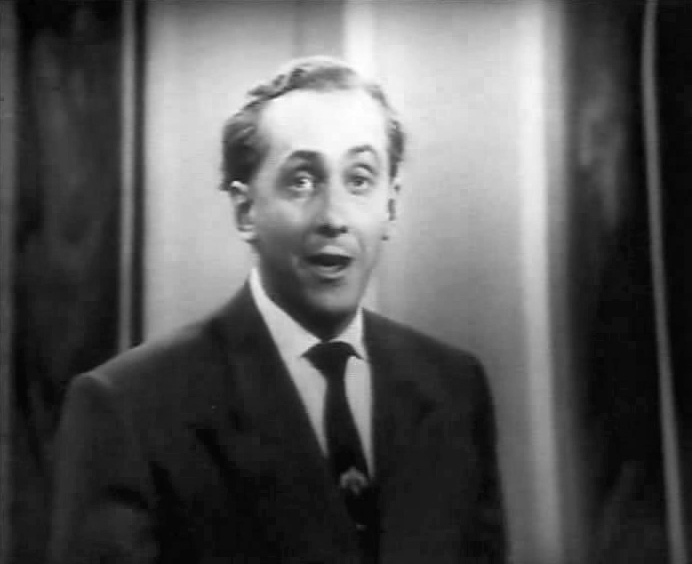
- Green presenting the first episode of Double Your Money, 1955
- Born: Hugh Hughes Green; 2 February 1920; Marylebone, London, England
- Died: 3 May 1997 (aged 77); Chelsea, London, England
- Resting place: Golders Green Crematorium, London
- Education: Arnold House School
- Occupations: Radio and television presenter, game show host, actor
- Years active: 1943–1978
- Known for: Double Your Money; Opportunity Knocks
- Spouse: Claire Wilson (m. 1942; div. 1975)
- Children: 4, including Paula Yates
- Relatives: Peaches Geldof (granddaughter); Pixie Geldof (granddaughter); Tiger Hutchence-Geldof (granddaughter)

Hugh Hughes Green OStJ (2 February 1920 – 3 May 1997) was an English radio and television presenter, game show host and actor.

== Early life ==
Green was born in Marylebone, London, to a Scottish father, Hugh Aitchison Green, a former British Army officer from Glasgow who made his fortune supplying canned fish to the Allied forces in the First World War, and an English mother, Violet Elenore (née Price), from Surrey, the daughter of an Irish gardener. The family had a home in Meopham, Kent, where the children lived with their mother, who took frequent lovers, while their father did business from the Savoy Hotel, and often stayed there. Green attended Arnold House School, a boys' prep school, in the St John's Wood district of Westminster, Greater London.

== Career ==
=== Child performer ===
After the family business went bankrupt, Green's father encouraged his stage-obsessed son into performance, and by the age of 14, Hughie Green had his own BBC Radio show and created and toured with his own all-children cast concert party called "Hughie Green and his Gang". After an extensive tour of Canada, in 1935 Green appeared in his first film, Midshipman Easy, then went to Hollywood, California, where he appeared in the film Tom Brown's School Days and at the Cocoanut Grove with his cabaret act.

=== Second World War ===
Having already fathered his first illegitimate child with a Birmingham usherette, at the age of 17 and having been caught in North America on the declaration of war, during the Second World War Green served as a pilot in the Royal Canadian Air Force, ferrying aircraft across the Atlantic with RAF Ferry Command. In 1942, he married Montreal society beauty Claire Wilson, and went on to work in the aircraft industry as a ferry transport pilot and stunt pilot. From 1947, when he returned to London, he was involved in business activities that included selling aircraft.

=== Radio presenter ===
In 1949, Green devised a talent show called Opportunity Knocks, which was commissioned by BBC Radio. The show lasted for only one series, and Green was apparently told it was "too American" for the British audience. After the show was cancelled, Green sued the BBC, Carroll Levis, and six friends and family of Levis, alleging a conspiracy to keep his Opportunity Knocks show off the air to preserve Levis's rival show, Discoveries. The case came to trial at the High Court in May 1955, with Green represented by Viscount Hailsham. The trial lasted for twenty days, but on 27 May, after a retirement of only 20 minutes, the jury returned a verdict for the defendants. As a result of the costs in the case, Green's creditors filed a petition for his bankruptcy, and a receiving order was made on 8 May 1956. He was not discharged from bankruptcy until 18 June 1958.

=== Mainstream popularity ===
Green became a household name in 1955, with the ITV quiz show Double Your Money, which had actually originated some years earlier on Radio Luxembourg. Green brought his future co-host Monica Rose to the screen. Rose, a chirpy 15-year-old Cockney junior accounts clerk, had won £8 answering questions on famous women and was invited back by Green to be a hostess.

On 8 November 1966, Hughie Green presented the show from The House of Friendship in Moscow. Along with Monica Rose, he also had Natasha Vasylyeva as assistant. Because the Communist Party would not allow money as a prize, the top prize was a television set.

Green's most successful show format was his self-developed long-running talent show, Opportunity Knocks. It started as a UK-wide touring show produced for the radio, and one of Green's early finds was singer Frankie Vaughan, who came second as part of a duet. When the show transferred to television on the ITV network, first in 1956 and then again from 1964, it began the show-business careers of Les Dawson, Lena Zavaroni, Pam Ayres, and Mary Hopkin, among others. Green, who possessed a pilot's licence, would fly the panel of judges between audition venues all over Britain, in his small Cessna aircraft.

His game show The Sky's the Limit was generally considered a failure, and was dropped by most ITV regional companies after the first run, although it lasted until 1974 in the Yorkshire and Granada regions, eventually being cancelled because of low ratings, combined with a falling-out between Green and producer Jess Yates.

Right up until its final shows, Opportunity Knocks was a ratings hit that attracted up to 18 million viewers weekly. However, Green, known for his right-wing politics, had decided he was bigger than the show format he had devised, and began politicising an apolitical family-friendly format. It has been suggested that Green believed that Harold Wilson and his Labour government were communists, that Prince Philip, Duke of Edinburgh, should replace Wilson as leader of the country and, to that end, he used Opportunity Knocks as an end-of-year soapbox, telling the country at the end of 1974 to 'wake up!' Two years later, in December 1976, Green recited a monologue about the state of the United Kingdom, followed by a choir singing "Stand Up and Be Counted", with the words coming up in subtitles: "Stand up and be counted, where the managers manage and the workers don't go on strike". It was released as a single in 1977, and partly seen as an open gesture of support for Conservative leader Margaret Thatcher; he was disciplined by Thames Television, but continued to make political comments. After numerous viewer complaints, Thames axed the show in March 1978, despite it attracting high ratings, something Green mentioned in a bitter rant against Thames in his last show. The family-friendly Opportunity Knocks was replaced by the youth-orientated comedy series The Kenny Everett Video Show, which attracted 10 million viewers, although it never achieved the ratings of Opportunity Knocks.

In 1983, Green sued the New Zealand Broadcasting Corporation, claiming its 1975–78 version of Opportunity Knocks infringed his copyright. He lost and in 1989 the Judicial Committee of the Privy Council rejected his appeal, leaving him a £250,000 legal bill.

After his rather slow-paced and "end of the pier" entertainment-style shows were replaced with more active audience participation formats, Green tried presenting variants on the Opportunity Knocks theme in Ireland, Australia and in the USSR.

== Style ==
Green was often mocked for his permanent door-to-door salesman's smile and Canadian accent. His catchphrase "I mean that most sincerely" was also mocked, to such an extent that it is sometimes mistakenly believed to have been invented by the impressionist Mike Yarwood, who was known for his impersonation of Green. In a 1992 TV interview, Green told Phillip Schofield that he had come up with the catchphrase himself. During Double Your Money, Green kept up an occasional but good-natured feud with quiz show host Michael Miles, who hosted Take Your Pick. Miles even appeared on one occasion with a huge bouquet of flowers for a guest, to Green's mock indignation.

== Recordings ==
Green made a number of recordings. As a solo act he released singles on the Parlophone, Decca, Columbia, EMI and Philips labels. He also recorded an album, Songs For Children which was released on York Records MYK 601 in 1971.

== Personal life ==
Green met Montreal socialite Claire Wilson on a cruise liner in the mid-1930s when both were still teenagers. They married in 1942 and settled in Montreal, before moving to London in 1947. The couple had two children. The family lived in a fifth-floor flat in Baker Street, London, although with Green's numerous affairs and self-obsession, including taking luxury holidays and often spending Christmas on his own, his children defined it as "highly dysfunctional".

The Greens separated in 1961 and filed for divorce in March 1975, after Green started an affair with Gwen Claremont, the sister of an earlier lover, Pat. Later that year, Claire married Upstairs, Downstairs actor David Langton. After the separation from his wife, Green's drinking became more compulsive, while his affairs continued, even during the height of his fame presenting Opportunity Knocks. Journalist Noel Botham approached Green to expose him, but Green countered with a lawsuit threat. Eventually, the two became friends.

Botham then became key in two stories in Green's life. Green grew frustrated by Yorkshire Television's failure to remove programme producer Jess Yates when he requested this to be done, and so leaked to Botham the stories of Yates' affair with the young actress Anita Kay, whose story, published in the News of the World, destroyed Yates' career. In May 1997, shortly after Green's death, Botham wrote the exposé story, also in the News of the World, of Green being the biological father of Jess Yates' daughter, TV presenter Paula Yates, something she read when the tabloids printed the story, and which was later confirmed with a DNA test result in December 1997.

Through his daughter Paula Yates, Green had four other granddaughters whom he never knew: Fifi, Peaches and Pixie Geldof, fathered by Bob Geldof; and Tiger Hutchence-Geldof, fathered by Michael Hutchence and legally adopted by Bob Geldof in 2007.

Green's final partner for the last five years of his life was Christina Sharples, widow of his long-term musical director Bob Sharples, who had died in 1987.

== Death ==
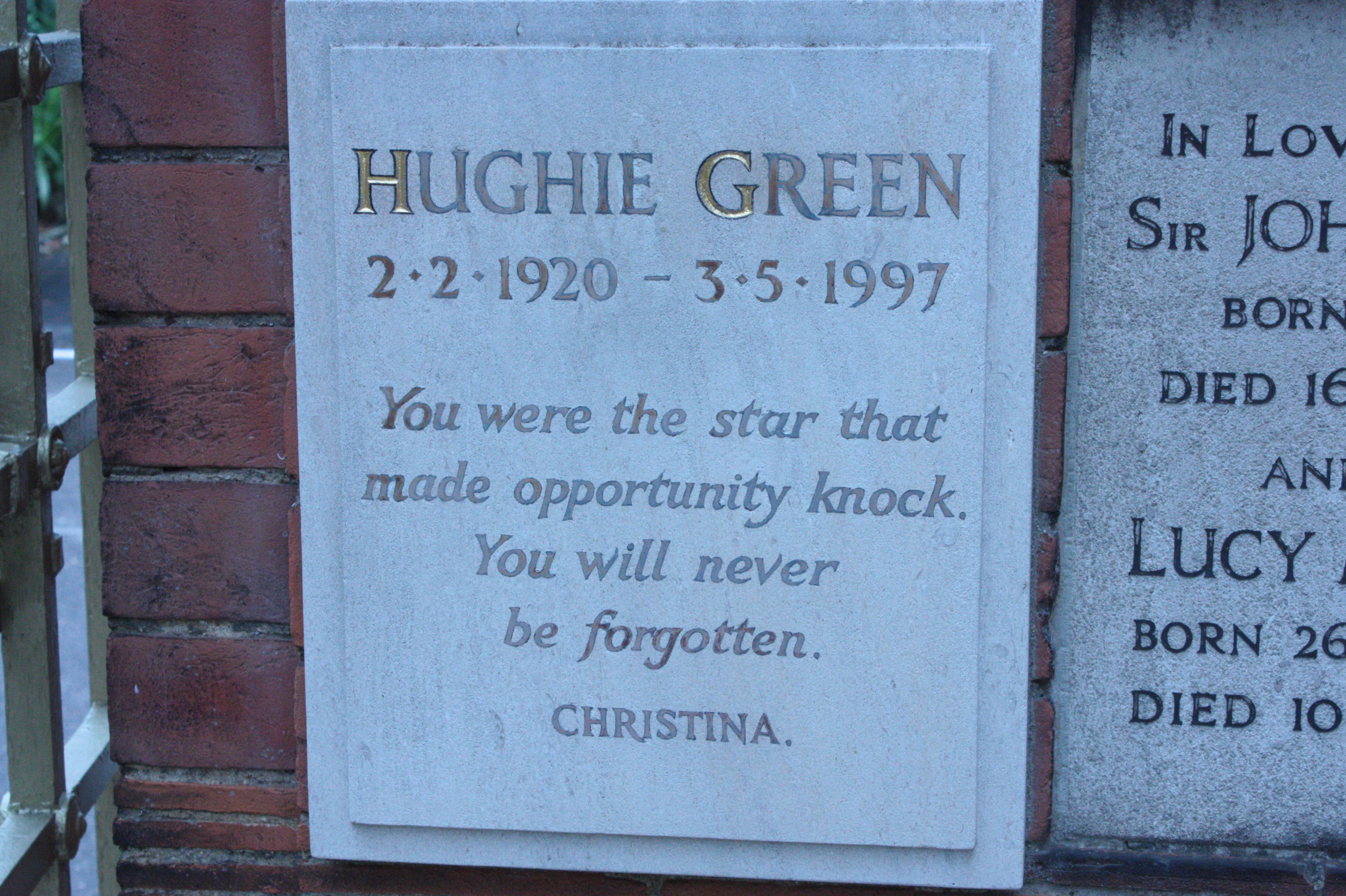
Memorial plaque to Hughie Green, Golders Green Crematorium

In July 1993, after a lifetime of smoking a pipe, heavy drinking and latterly taking recreational barbiturates, Green was diagnosed with oesophageal cancer, and admitted to the Royal Marsden Hospital, Chelsea, London. By 1997, the cancer had spread to his lungs. Green died in hospital on Saturday 3 May 1997, aged 77.

His memorial at Golders Green Crematorium reads: "You were the star that made opportunity knock. You will never be forgotten".

== Legacy ==
In light of the death in 2000 of his daughter Paula Yates, his son Christopher Green, wrote the biographical perspective Hughie and Paula: The Tangled Lives of Hughie Green and Paula Yates.

On 2 April 2008 a TV film, Hughie Green, Most Sincerely, starring Trevor Eve, was broadcast on BBC Four. In The Sunday Telegraph of 3 February 2008, his daughter Linda Plentl said the film would "reopen intolerable wounds". She told of her struggle with his legacy and her three meetings with half-sister Paula Yates.

== Filmography ==
Year	Title	Role	Notes
1934	Little Friend	boy	uncredited
1935	Radio Pirates	impressionist	
1935	Midshipman Easy	Midshipman Easy	
1937	Melody and Romance	Hughie Hawkins	
1939	Down Our Alley	Hughie Dunstable	
1939	Music Hall Parade	himself	
1940	Tom Brown's School Days	Walker Brooke	
1947	If Winter Comes	Freddie Perch	
1948	Hills of Home	Geordie	
1949	Paper Orchid	Harold Croup	
1978	What's Up Superdoc!	Bob Scratchitt	final film role
