= Dotti =

Dotti is an Italian surname. Notable people with the surname include:

- DOTTi The Deity (born Okeowo Oladotun Alani; 1994), Nigerian singer and songwriter
- Alan David Dotti (born 1977), Brazilian footballer
- Andrea Dotti (disambiguation), multiple people
- Bartolomeo Dotti (1651–1713), Italian satirical poet and adventurer
- Carlo Francesco Dotti (1670–1759), Bolognese architect
- Isabel Dotti (born 1947), Argentine mathematician
- Juan Pablo Dotti (born 1984), Argentine cyclist
- Mario Dotti, Italian rugby union player
- Orlando Octacílio Dotti (born 1930), Brazilian Roman Catholic bishop
- Piero Dotti (1939–2026), Italian footballer
- Roberto Dotti (born 1961), Italian cyclist
- Tommaso Dotti, Italian short track speed skater

== See also ==
- Dotti (retailer), Australian fashion retailer
