= Freedom Deep =

Single by INXS

from the album Full Moon, Dirty Hearts
- Released: 18 April 1994
- Studio: Capri Digital (Capri, Italy)
- Length: 3.59
- Label: EastWest
- Songwriters: Andrew Farriss; Michael Hutchence

INXS singles chronology
"Time" (1993)	"Freedom Deep" (1994)	"The Strangest Party (These Are the Times)" (1994)

"Freedom Deep" is the fourth and final single from the 1993 album, Full Moon, Dirty Hearts, by Australian rock band INXS. The song was written by Andrew Farriss and Michael Hutchence.

== Background ==
"Freedom Deep" was played live at The Great Music Experience in Nara, Japan in May 1994 at the UNESCO Concert, the idea being to bring together Japanese and Western Music. The song arrangement was backed up by a unique selection of Japanese instruments which fitted in perfectly with the songs' musical style. Other artists at the Event were Bob Dylan, Bon Jovi and Joni Mitchell.

The single was only released in Japan and Australia, where it charted at #111 on the ARIA singles chart.

== B-sides ==
The B-sides on maxi-CD single and cassette releases include three remixes of tracks on the Full Moon, Dirty Hearts album

== Track listings ==
CD Maxi Single (4509957882)

1. Freedom Deep (3:59)
2. Please (You Got That …) (E-Smoove Club Mix) (8:01)
3. Cut Your Roses Down (Sure Is Pure Mix) (6:55)
4. Viking Juice (The Butcher Mix) (3:14)

== Charts ==
Chart (1994)	Peak position
Australia (ARIA)	111
