= Paula Yates =

British television personality and writer (1959–2000)

- Born: Paula Elizabeth Yates; 24 April 1959; Colwyn Bay, Denbighshire, Wales
- Died: 17 September 2000 (aged 41); Notting Hill, London, England
- Occupations: Television presenter, writer
- Years active: 1979–2000
- Known for: The Tube; The Big Breakfast
- Spouse: Bob Geldof (m. 1986; div. 1996)
- Partner: Michael Hutchence (1995–1997; his death)
- Children: 4, including Peaches, Pixie and Tiger
- Parents: Jess Yates (legal father); Hughie Green (biological father)

Paula Elizabeth Yates (24 April 1959 – 17 September 2000) was a British television presenter and writer. She was best known for presenting the Channel 4 television programmes The Tube and The Big Breakfast. She was subjected to intense media attention and scrutiny, owing to her popularity and her relationships with musicians Bob Geldof and Michael Hutchence.

== Early life ==
Born on 24 April 1959 in Colwyn Bay, Wales, to English parents, Yates was brought up in a show business family. Her mother was Elaine Smith (whose stage name was Heller Toren, and who later wrote under the pseudonym Helene Thornton). Up until 1997, Yates believed her biological father to be Jess Yates, who hosted the ITV religious programme Stars on Sunday. A DNA test in that year revealed that her biological father was game show host Hughie Green.

Yates described her childhood as lonely and isolated, stating that her mother was absent for much of her upbringing. She attended a village primary school, Penrhos College, and Ysgol Aberconwy. The Yates family ran the Deganwy Castle Hotel for a time.

== Career ==
In 1979, Yates began her career as a music journalist with a column called "Natural Blonde" in the Record Mirror, shortly after posing for Penthouse magazine.

Yates first came to prominence in the 1980s, as co-presenter (with Jools Holland) of the Channel 4 pop music programme The Tube.

In 1982, Yates released a version of the Nancy Sinatra hit song "These Boots Are Made for Walkin'" from the Music of Quality and Distinction Volume One album by B.E.F. (British Electric Foundation).

She also appeared alongside her friend Jennifer Saunders in 1987 for a spoof documentary on pop group Bananarama.

After the births of her daughters, Yates wrote two books on motherhood. She continued with her rock journalism, in addition to being presenter of the music show The Tube.

Yates became known for her "on the bed" interviews on the show The Big Breakfast, produced by her husband, Bob Geldof.

At the time of her death in 2000, Yates was working on a book titled Sex and Death, writing about her life from the moment she visited Hutchence's body in the mortuary.

== Personal life ==
Yates met Geldof in the early days of the Boomtown Rats. They began a romantic relationship in 1976 when she flew to Paris to surprise him while the band was playing there. Their first daughter, Fifi, was born in 1983. After ten years together, Yates and Geldof married on 31 August 1986 in Las Vegas, with Simon Le Bon of Duran Duran acting as best man. The couple then had two more daughters, Peaches on 13 March 1989, and Pixie on 17 September 1990.

Whilst married to Geldof, Yates had a year-long affair with American singer Terence Trent D'Arby. She also had a six-year long affair with actor Rupert Everett.

In 1985, Yates met INXS lead singer Michael Hutchence while interviewing him for Channel 4's rock magazine programme The Tube. During this appearance on The Tube, Yates was reportedly asked to leave Hutchence alone by the road manager of INXS when she walked up to him and said, "I'm going to have that boy [Hutchence]". Yates was unmoved by the manager's request and began attending INXS concerts at numerous locations for the next few years, even taking her young daughter Fifi along. Yates maintained irregular contact with Hutchence during the intervening nine years, and their affair had been under way for some months before their Big Breakfast interview in October 1994.

Geldof and Yates separated in February 1995 and divorced in May 1996. On 22 July 1996, Yates gave birth to a daughter by Hutchence, Tiger Lily.

On 22 November 1997, Hutchence was found dead in a hotel room in Sydney. The coroner ruled his death as suicide by hanging. Yates had planned to visit Hutchence in Australia with their daughter and Yates's three other children, but Geldof had taken legal action to prevent the visit. Yates indicated that when she informed Hutchence that she would not be able to bring the girls to Australia as previously intended, Hutchence was "terribly upset" and said, "'I don't know how I'll live without seeing Tiger'". Following Hutchence's death, Yates became distraught, refusing to accept the coroner's verdict of suicide and insisting that it was a case of auto-erotic asphyxiation.

In December 1997, a few weeks after Hutchence's death and while Yates was fighting for custody of her daughter with Hutchence, a DNA paternity test confirmed tabloid media speculation that Jess Yates, who had died in April 1993, was not her biological father after all. The test showed that Yates was fathered by show host Hughie Green, who had died six months before Hutchence.

In June 1998, Geldof won full custody of the couple's three daughters after Yates attempted suicide.

Yates met Kingsley O'Keke during her stay in treatment, but the pair broke up after a six-week romance. O'Keke later sold his story to a tabloid newspaper.

== Death ==
On 17 September 2000, on Pixie's 10th birthday, Yates died at her home in Notting Hill at the age of 41 of a heroin overdose. The coroner ruled that it was not a suicide, but a result of "foolish and incautious" behaviour. Yates was discovered in the presence of her four-year-old daughter, Tiger Lily. A friend disclosed during the inquest that Yates had not taken illegal drugs for nearly two years, and the coroner, Paul Knapman, concluded that although the amount Yates had taken would not have killed an addict, "an unsophisticated taker of heroin" like Yates had no tolerance for the drug.

Soon after Yates's death, Geldof assumed foster custody of Tiger Lily so that she could be brought up with her three elder half-sisters, Fifi, Peaches and Pixie. Her aunt, Tina Hutchence, the sister of Michael Hutchence, was denied permission by the judge to apply for Tiger Lily to live with her in California. In 2007, Geldof adopted Tiger Lily and changed her surname to Geldof; as of 2022, Tiger's legal name was Heavenly Hiraani Tiger Lily Hutchence-Geldof.

On 7 April 2014, Yates's second-eldest daughter Peaches also died of a heroin overdose, aged 25. One day before her death, she uploaded a picture to her Instagram of herself as a young girl and her mother under the caption "Me and my Mum."

== Legacy ==
On 14 March 2023, Yates was the subject of a two-part Channel 4 documentary, entitled Paula, which looked at her life and career. The documentary highlighted the intense media surrounding Yates and the often negative coverage in the British press. Paula included interviews with her friends and social commentators including best friend Belinda Brewin, Nicky Clarke, Robbie Williams, Vanessa Feltz and Grace Dent, and used archive footage of Yates and previously unheard recorded interviews, conducted shortly after the death of Hutchence. Brewin revealed that she and Yates had been shopping on the Fulham Road in London, when they met Diana, Princess of Wales, who told Yates: "I love it when you're on the front page of the papers, because it means I got the day off".

In a review for Paula, Lucy Mangan, writing for The Guardian, hailed the documentary as "a glorious celebration of the most witty, flirty woman to ever grace our TVs" and gave the show 4/5 stars. Carol Midgeley, writing for The Times, also gave the documentary 4/5 stars, opining that Yates was a "fizzling force of nature". Gerard Gilbert, writing for the newspaper I, rated the documentary 3/5 stars, adding that he "was left with a tragic sense that Yates's untimely death robbed us of an intriguing second act".

The first episode of the documentary garnered 970,000 viewers, beating that night's BBC2 and Channel 5 offerings.

== Filmography ==
=== Selected credits ===
Year	Title	Role	Notes
1982–1987	The Tube	Presenter	122 episodes
1982–1992	Wogan	Herself	6 episodes
1985	Fashion Aid	Herself	
1988	French and Saunders	Herself	Episode: Christmas Special
1992–1995	The Big Breakfast	Herself/ On the Bed Interviewer	
1995	Sex with Paula	Presenter	
2000	Friday Night's All Wright	Herself	Episode dated 18 February 2000
2019	Mystify: Michael Hutchence	Herself	Feature documentary; archive footage
2023	Paula	Herself	2-part Channel 4 documentary

== Bibliography ==
Yates was the author of several books, including:

- Rock Stars in Their Underpants (1980)
- A Tail of Two Kitties (1983)
- Blondes (1983)
- Sex with Paula Yates (1986)
- The Fun Starts Here (1990)
- The Fun Don't Stop: Loads of Rip-roaring Activities for You and Your Toddler (1991)
- And the Fun Goes On: A Practical Guide to Playing and Learning with Your Pre-school Child (1991)
- Village People (1993)
- The Autobiography (1995)
- Sex & Death (2000 Unpublished)

== Works cited ==
- Agar, Gerry (2014). Paula, Michael and Bob: Everything You Know Is Wrong. Michael O'Mara Books. ISBN 978-1-78243-315-6.
- Bozza, Anthony (2005). INXS Story To Story: The Official Autobiography. Bantam Books. ISBN 978-0-593-05517-5.
- Green, Christopher; Clerk, Carol (2003). Hughie and Paula: The Tangled Lives of Hughie Green and Paula Yates. London: Robson. ISBN 1-86105-609-5.
- Rojek, Chris (2001). Celebrity. London: Reaktion Books. ISBN 1-86189-104-0.
