= Time (INXS song) =

1994 single by INXS

Single by INXS

from the album Full Moon, Dirty Hearts
- Released: 24 January 1994
- Length: 2:55
- Label: EastWest
- Songwriters: Andrew Farriss, Michael Hutchence
- Producers: Mark Opitz, INXS

INXS singles chronology
"Please (You Got That ...)" (1993)	"Time" (1994)	"Freedom Deep" (1994)

"Time" is a song by Australian rock band INXS, released as the third single from their ninth studio album, Full Moon, Dirty Hearts (1993). Written by Andrew Farriss and Michael Hutchence, the song was released only in Australia and Japan as a "Souvenir EP" to coincide with the Dirty Honeymoon Tour in Australia and the Southern Hemisphere.

== B-sides ==
The B-sides on the maxi CD single and cassette releases include live performances of "Communication" and "Taste It" from Welcome to Wherever You Are, as well as "The Gift" and "Please (You Got That ...)" from Full Moon, Dirty Hearts, which were all recorded on 8 May 1993 in Santa Monica, California, on the Get Out of the House tour.

== Track listings ==
CD and cassette single

1. "Time"
2. "Communication" (live)
3. "The Gift" (live)
4. "Please (You Got That ...)" (live)
5. "Taste It" (live)

== Charts ==
Chart (1994)	Peak position
Australia (ARIA)	36

== Release history ==
Region	Date	Format(s)	Label	Ref.
Australia	24 January 1994	CD	EastWest	
Japan	25 March 1994	CD	EastWest	
