= Pixie Geldof =

English model and singer

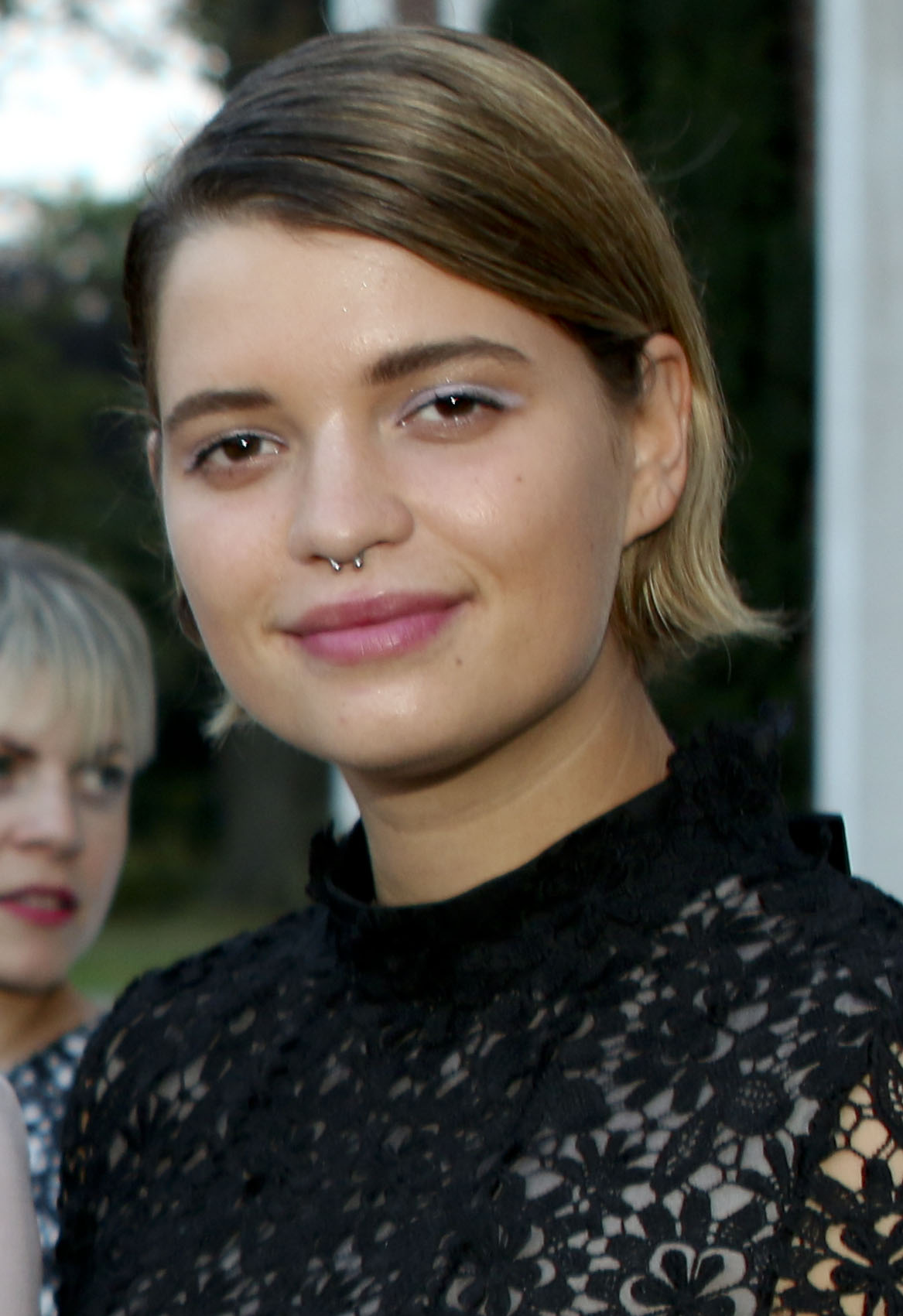
- Geldof in 2014
- Born: Little Pixie Geldof; 17 September 1990 (age 36); London, England
- Occupations: Model; singer-songwriter
- Years active: 2008–present
- Spouse: George Barnett (m. 2017)
- Children: 1
- Parents: Bob Geldof (father); Paula Yates (mother)
- Relatives: Peaches Geldof (sister); Tiger Hutchence-Geldof (half-sister); Hughie Green (maternal grandfather)

Little Pixie Geldof (born 17 September 1990) is an English-born model and singer. She is the third daughter of Irish musician Bob Geldof and Paula Yates.

== Early life ==
Geldof is the third daughter of Irish musician Bob Geldof and Paula Yates. She is also the biological granddaughter of Hughie Green. Pixie had two sisters, Fifi Trixibelle Geldof (born 1983) and Peaches Geldof (1989–2014), and has a half-sister, Heavenly Hiraani Tiger Lily Hutchence-Geldof (born 1996), from her mother's relationship with INXS frontman Michael Hutchence. Her great-grandmother was Jewish.

== Career ==
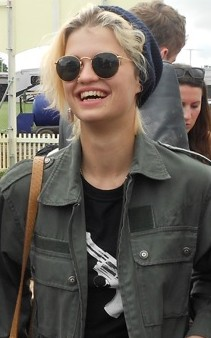
Geldof in June 2011

=== Modeling ===
Her first magazine cover modeling appearance was for Tatler in 2008. She has also been the face of advertising campaigns for Levi's, Diesel, Henry Holland, Razzle, Agent Provocateur, Loewe and Pringle of Scotland, as well as modelling for Vivienne Westwood, Luella and Jeremy Scott. She modeled for Debenhams in 2010.

=== Music ===
Geldof is the lead singer of the band Violet, who released their first single in May 2012. She was scheduled to DJ at the 2014 Coachella in April but cancelled it due to the death of her sister.

She released her first album I'm Yours in November 2016. It was recorded in Los Angeles and produced by Tony Hoffer.

== Personal life ==
Geldof is vegan, and as of February 2013, lives in Upper Clapton with George Barnett, drummer of These New Puritans. The couple married in June 2017 in Mallorca. They have one child, a daughter born in 2021.

=== Activism ===
Geldof has a passion for marine wildlife, especially sharks. She is an advocate for marine conservation and was one of the ambassadors for the #PassOnPlastic campaign against the pollution of water by single use plastic led by Project Zero and Sky Ocean Rescue.

She also advocates against animal testing in the cosmetic industry. In October 2018, she was part of a delegation that went to the United Nations in New York City to present a petition launched by The Body Shop to end cosmetic animal testing worldwide.
