= Jess Yates =

British television presenter (1918–1993)

- Born: Jesse Frederick Joseph Yates; 20 December 1918; Tyldesley, Lancashire, England
- Died: 9 April 1993 (aged 74); Llandudno, Wales
- Occupations: Television presenter, producer
- Known for: Stars on Sunday
- Spouse: Elaine Smith (m. 1958–1975)
- Children: Paula Yates

Jesse Frederick Joseph Yates (20 December 1918 – 9 April 1993) was a British television presenter and producer. He was the creator, presenter and producer of Yorkshire Television's religious programme Stars on Sunday.

He was born in Tyldesley, Lancashire. His family moved to Llandudno when he was five. After leaving school, Yates worked as a cinema organist. He was born into a show business family; his mother booked stage acts. After the war he worked for BBC Television as a freelance designer and joined the BBC on the production side in 1949. He was involved with programmes such as Come Dancing, The Good Old Days and the Miss World competition.

In 1968, he became Head of Children's programmes for Yorkshire Television. The following year, he began hosting Stars on Sunday. Yates introduced the show seated at an electric organ, placed in front of a stained-glass window. One of his many observations was, "We can't see round the bend in the road, but God can." The programme attracted many special guests, including Harry Secombe, Dame Anna Neagle and Gracie Fields. He was quoted as wanting stars to appear on the programme as that is what he thought would persuade viewers to tune in.

From 1958 to 1975, Yates was married to actress and author Elaine Smith (whose stage name was Heller Toren, and who later wrote under the pseudonym Helene Thornton), who gave birth to a daughter Paula, born in 1959. His TV presenting career ended in 1974 when it was publicly revealed that he had been having an affair with young actress Anita Kay, although he was separated from his wife at the time. Amid the ensuing furore, Yates had to be smuggled from Yorkshire Television's studio complex in Leeds in the boot of a car.

Jess Yates died of a stroke in April 1993, aged 74. In December 1997, a DNA test revealed that Paula Yates's biological father was not Jess Yates, but the television presenter Hughie Green, a one-time friend of Jess Yates who became his long-term rival from the 1960s onwards. Green was a key man in exposing Jess Yates's affair with Anita Kay back in 1974.

== Sources ==
- The Daily Telegraph Third Book of Obituaries (Entertainers), edited by Hugh Massingberd
