= Michael Hutchence (album) =

Studio album by Michael Hutchence
- Released: 14 December 1999
- Recorded: 1995–1997
- Studio: Real World Studios, Nomis Studios, London, and Andy Gill's home studio, London.
- Genre: Alternative rock; electronic
- Length: 52:43
- Label: V2
- Producer: Andy Gill; Michael Hutchence; Danny Saber
- Compiler: Andy Gill

Michael Hutchence chronology
Michael Hutchence (1999)	Mystify: A Musical Journey with Michael Hutchence (2019)

Singles from Michael Hutchence
- 1. "A Straight Line" Released: 1999; 2. "Slide Away" Released: 2000 (promo)

Michael Hutchence is the only solo album by Australian singer Michael Hutchence, known as the lead vocalist of INXS from 1977 until his death in 1997. The album was posthumously released on 14 December 1999, over two years after Hutchence's death.

Hutchence began work on what would become his posthumous solo album in 1995 with Tim Simenon. He then invited Andy Gill (of Gang of Four) to perform on and co-write the album. Gill joined Hutchence at his house and home studio in Roquefort-les-Pins and over a five-month period continued to write and record in France and London. They were fans of Black Grape and decided to enlist Black Grape producer Danny Saber as co-producer with Gill of the album. After Hutchence's death in 1997, Gill asked Bono, singer of U2 and Hutchence's friend, to record additional vocals which were added to the track "Slide Away".

This album was simply dedicated to "Tiger" in reference to Hutchence's daughter, Tiger Hutchence-Geldof. The last song that Hutchence worked on before his death was "Possibilities", which is track 2 on the album.

== Commercial performance ==
In the singer's native Australia, the album entered and peaked at number three on the Australian Albums Chart on the week of 24 October 1999, and spent a total of three weeks in the charts. The album was quickly certified Gold by the Australian Recording Industry Association (ARIA). In the UK, the album peaked at number 90 and lasted one week in the charts.

== Critical reception ==
Professional ratings
Review scores
Source	Rating
AllMusic	3/5 stars
PopMatters	8/10 stars
Rolling Stone	3.5/5 stars

The album received positive reviews upon its release and was noted by some critics for being dark and moody. Rolling Stone staff writer David Fricke gave the album three and a half out of five stars, stating "Much of the music on this record has a gray chill". He admired the singer's motivation on the record saying "Hutchence was as serious about his craft as he was intoxicated by rock-star living" and that "he set his arena-rock torch singing in a provocative landscape of melancholy-machine music." In his AllMusic review, journalist Carlo Wolff rated the album three stars out of five and wrote "there is enough good material here to warrant a listen, perhaps even shed a tear." He added, "this curious, occasionally exciting collection showcases the more vulnerable side of Hutchence" and that "this autobiographical album resonates beyond its sad, faintly kinky pedigree". Editor and writer Patrick Schabe scored the album 8 out of 10 stars in his review for PopMatters writing "On Michael Hutchence's eponymously titled solo album, it's not a disappointing pastime" and that "this piece is thankfully an incredible success."

== Track listing ==
Michael Hutchence track listing
No.	Title	Writer(s)	Length
1.	"Let Me Show You"	Andy Gill; Michael Hutchence	3:38
2.	"Possibilities"	Hutchence; Danny Saber	4:31
3.	"Get on the Inside"	Gill; Hutchence	4:48
4.	"Fear"	Gill; Hutchence	3:43
5.	"All I'm Saying"	Hutchence; Tim Simenon	4:05
6.	"A Straight Line"	Hutchence; Gill	3:38
7.	"Baby It's Alright"	Hutchence; Saber	3:52
8.	"Don't Save Me from Myself"	Hutchence; Gill	3:21
9.	"She Flirts for England"	Hutchence; Gill	3:12
10.	"Flesh and Blood"	Hutchence; Gill	5:03
11.	"Put the Pieces Back Together"	Hutchence; Gill	4:38
12.	"Breathe"	Hutchence; Saber	3:52
13.	"Slide Away" (featuring Bono)	Hutchence; Gill	4:22
Total length:			52:43

== Personnel ==
- Michael Hutchence – vocals
- Kenny Aronoff – drums on "Possibilities", "Baby It's Alright", and "Breathe"
- Bono – vocals on "Slide Away"
- Harry Borden – photography
- Jason Clift – assistant engineer at Nomis Studios, London, UK
- Jonathan Cohen – cello on "Flesh and Blood" and "Slide Away"
- Kevin Cummins – photography
- Gail Ann Dorsey – backing vocals on "Flesh and Blood" and "Slide Away"
- Bernard Fowler – backing vocals on "Baby It's Alright"
- Joanna Gammie – viola on "Flesh and Blood" and "Slide Away"
- Andy Gill – guitar on "Let Me Show You", "Get on the Inside", "Fear", "All I'm saying", "A Straight Line", "Don't Save Me from Myself", "She Flirts for England", "Flesh and Blood", "Put the Pieces Back Together", and "Slide Away"; bass guitar on "Fear", "Flesh and Blood", and "Slide Away"; keyboards on "She Flirts for England", "Slide Away", "Flesh and Blood"; programming on "Let Me Show You", "Fear", "All I'm Saying", "A Straight Line", "Get on the Inside", "Don't Save Me from Myself", "She Flirts for England", "Flesh and Blood", "Put the Pieces Back Together", and "Slide Away"; production
- Denise Johnson – backing vocals on "Get on the Inside", "Fear", "A Straight Line", "Put the Pieces Back Together"
- Ged Lynch – drums on "Let Me Show You", "Fear", "A Straight Line", "Don't Save Me from Myself", "Put the Pieces Back Together" and percussion on "Get on the Inside" and "All I'm Saying"
- Steve Madaio – trumpet on "Get on the Inside"
- Steve Monty – drums on "Fear"
- Susan McGill – violin on "Flesh and Blood" and "Slide Away"
- Tony Morse – string arrangement on "Possibilities" and "Baby It's Alright"
- Tim Palmer – mixing on "Flesh and Blood" and "Slide Away"
- Guy Pratt – bass guitar on "Let Me Show You", "Fear", "Don't Save Me from Myself", "Put the Pieces Back Together"
- Steven Price – acoustic guitar on "Flesh and Blood" and string arrangement on "Flesh and Blood" and "Slide Away"
- Herb Ritts – photography
- Danny Saber – bass guitar on "Let Me Show You", "Possibilities", "Get on the Inside", "A Straight Line", "Baby It's Alright", "Don't Save Me from Myself", "Put the Pieces Back Together", "Breathe"; guitar on "Let Me Show You", "Possibilities", "Get on the Inside", "Fear", "All I'm Saying", "A Straight Line", "Baby It's Alright", "Don't Save Me from Myself", "Put the Pieces Back Together", "Breathe"; keyboards on "Possibilities", "Get on the Inside", "All I'm Saying", "A Straight Line", "Baby It's Alright", "Breathe"; drums on "Breathe", programming on "Let Me Show You", "Possibilities", "Get on the Inside", "Fear", "All I'm Saying", "A Straight Line", "Baby It's Alright", "Don't Save Me from Myself", "Flesh and Blood", "Put the Pieces Back Together", "Breathe"; production
- Stevie Salas – guitar on "Baby It's Alright"
- Paul Stoney – assistant engineer at Nomis Studios, London, UK
- Joe Strummer – vocals on "Let Me Show You"
- Natalie Thompson – violin on "Flesh and Blood" and "Slide Away"
- David L. Woodruff – horn on "A Straight Line"
- John 'X' – backing vocals on "Get on the Inside", mixing on "Let Me Show You", "Possibilities", "Get on the Inside", "Fear", "All I'm Saying", "A Straight Line", "Baby It's Alright", "Don't Save Me from Myself", "She Flirts for England", "Put the Pieces Back Together" and "Breathe"

== Charts and certifications ==
=== Weekly charts ===
Chart (1999)	Peak position
Australian Albums (ARIA)	3
Scottish Albums (OCC)	94
UK Albums (OCC)	90
UK Independent Albums (OCC)	13
US Billboard 200	200

=== Year-end charts ===
Chart (1999)	Position
Australian Albums (ARIA)	60

=== Certifications ===
Region	Certification	Certified units/sales
Australia (ARIA)	Platinum	70,000^{^}
United States (RIAA)	—	34,042
^{^} Shipments figures based on certification alone.
