= Mystify: Michael Hutchence =

2019 documentary film by Richard Lowenstein

- Theatrical release poster
- Directed by: Richard Lowenstein
- Written by: Richard Lowenstein
- Produced by: Maya Gnyp; John Battsek; Sue Murray; Mark Fennessy; Richard Lowenstein; Lynn-Maree Milburn; Andrew de Groot
- Starring: Michael Hutchence (See below)
- Cinematography: Andrew de Groot
- Edited by: Richard Lowenstein; Lynn-Maree Milburn; Tayler Martin
- Music by: Warren Ellis
- Production companies: Passion Pictures; Ghost Pictures
- Distributed by: Madman Entertainment (Australia); Dogwoof (International)
- Release dates: 25 April 2019 (Tribeca); 4 July 2019 (Australia)
- Running time: 102 minutes
- Countries: Australia; United Kingdom
- Language: English
- Box office: $1.1 million

Mystify: Michael Hutchence is a 2019 documentary film about the life of musician, actor and singer-songwriter Michael Hutchence, lead vocalist of the Australian rock band INXS. It is written and directed by Richard Lowenstein and relies primarily on rare archive footage, outtakes, private home video and audio commentary provided by friends, ex-partners, band members, record producers and family. An Australian-British venture, the film was produced by Ghost Pictures and Passion Pictures in association with Baird Films and Film Victoria with Madman Entertainment and Dogwoof serving as distributors.

Mystify: Michael Hutchence had its world premiere at the Tribeca Film Festival on 25 April 2019, and was theatrically released in Australia on 4 July 2019. The film was released in the United Kingdom on 18 October receiving generally positive reviews from critics.

== Synopsis ==
Mystify covers the life of INXS lead singer Michael Hutchence, featuring private home video and archive footage. During the relationship between Minogue and Hutchence, previously unseen privately shot footage shows them in Hong Kong harbour, on board the Orient Express, and at Hutchence’s home in the south of France. In the early 1990s an incident occurred while cycling on holiday in Copenhagen with then girlfriend Helena Christensen, where Hutchence gets shoved to the ground by a taxi driver, hitting his head on the curb and losing consciousness. According to Christensen, Hutchence was rushed to hospital and woke up determined to leave. The injury resulted in Hutchence having permanent loss of sense of smell and taste as discussed by psychologist and cognitive neuroscientist, Rachel Herz. Clips show Yates and Hutchence in a 1985 interview on Channel 4's rock magazine programme The Tube and many years later on The Big Breakfast interview in October 1994. Recollections with voice-overs in the film include Michele Bennett, Kylie Minogue, siblings Rhett and Tina Hutchence, father Kelland Hutchence, stepmother Susie, producer Nick Launay, Bono and INXS band members; composer and keyboardist Andrew Farriss, guitarist Tim Farriss, bassist Garry Gary Beers and drummer Jon Farriss. The film ends with INXS performing at London’s Wembley Stadium and the song "Mystify" plays over the credits.

== Production ==
=== Development ===
Plans for a biographical drama film about Michael Hutchence were being developed with a script written by Australian film-maker Richard Lowenstein. Lowenstein had previously collaborated with Hutchence in Dogs in Space and INXS music videos. The film was to feature an actor as Hutchence, however the idea of casting someone proved very difficult and with the announcement of the miniseries INXS: Never Tear Us Apart, it made the director switch to an archival documentary. The documentary film gathered early development funding and support by the Australian Broadcasting Corporation (ABC), Screen Australia and Film Victoria.

A pitch trailer was produced and shown at the 2016 Australian International Documentary Conference in Melbourne where BBC Music took interest. In July 2016, it was announced that a documentary film about the singer-songwriter Michael Hutchence had the official support of INXS band members and manager Chris Murphy, with Richard Lowenstein signed on to direct.

The director conducted the first interview (for the biopic research) in 2010 with U2 lead singer Bono who were on tour in Melbourne. Band members from INXS were then interviewed and filmed in 2011, gradually building up an archive of footage. During the interview process, Lowenstein had decided to record just the audio, having individual interviewees in a dark recording studio. A total of around sixty people were interviewed.

Tapes of archival footage of varying quality were found in the directors attic lost for twenty years. In October 2017, long negotiations began for the rights to use INXS music in the film, but ended with no deal due to a dispute with Murphy of Petrol Records over the documentary’s ownership in return. This lead the director to produce an edit of the film with no music from the INXS catalogue. Eventually, Lowenstein made contact with Hutchence’s daughter Tiger Hutchence-Geldof (the daughter of Hutchence and Paula Yates) in London, through Susie Hutchence’s advice. Lowenstein flew to London in October 2018 to meet. After viewing a rough cut of the film, Tiger Lily made contact with the band’s management and record company. A day later, a deal was struck to use nine INXS tracks.

The post-production and supervision of the film were completed by United Finishing Artists with the sound mixing done at Soundfirm, Melbourne.

=== Music ===
Composer Warren Ellis was in charge of the film's music and score. The documentary features various digitally-restored tracks which were remixed by Giles Martin in Dolby Atmos supplied by INXS. Music also included are by Hutchence, Max Q with Ollie Olsen, Kylie Minogue, Nick Cave, instrumentals by Ólafur Arnalds and Nils Frahm.

The film includes tracks, such as: "Never Tear Us Apart" and "Sometimes". Lowenstein stated that there has been no official soundtrack album released, however, a complementary album was released on 5 July 2019 titled Mystify: A Musical Journey with Michael Hutchence.

== Release ==
The world premiere of Mystify: Michael Hutchence took place in Manhattan at the Tribeca Film Festival on 25 April 2019, including a live Q&A session with the film’s director after the screening. Over the next few months it played in festivals around Canada, Australia, Czech Republic, Germany and New Zealand, building anticipation: at the Hot Docs in Toronto, Sydney, Munich and New Zealand Film Festivals. Advance screenings with Lowenstein in attendance for special Q&A sessions followed in June, at the Astor Theatre in Melbourne, Ritz Cinema in Sydney and the European premiere held at the Karlovy Vary International Film Festival.

An official trailer was released on 4 June 2019 and featured the songs "Mystify" and "Never Tear Us Apart" by INXS. It was released in cinemas across Australia on 4 July and in New Zealand on 12 September through Madman Entertainment.

Initially the film was screened out of competition during the BFI London Film Festival on 4 October 2019 at the Curzon Mayfair Cinema and then released in the United Kingdom on 18 October through Dogwoof. The Netherlands saw a release on 24 October by Piece of Magic entertainment. In the United States Fathom Events and Shout! Factory theatrically released the film for one-night-only on 7 January 2020.

=== Broadcast ===
In Australia, the documentary was aired by ABC Television during 24 November 2019. Channel BBC Two aired the film in the UK on 28 December.

=== Home media ===
It was released on DVD, digital and Blu-ray disc in Australia by Madman Entertainment on 25 November 2019. It contains twelve special features including early days - where they discuss the band’s formation, acting, discussing Prague where three INXS music videos were filmed and Professor of Psychiatry, Steve Ellen’s analyses into Hutchence’s death. Dogwoof released the film in the United Kingdom and Ireland on 9 December. The extra features include an interview with director Richard Lowenstein and producer Chris Thomas, deleted scenes and theatrical trailer. It entered the UK Official DVD Chart at No. 98, the week ending 21 December.

== Reception ==
=== Box office ===
Mystify: Michael Hutchence grossed A$1.1 million (US$705,044) in Australia and $453,851 in other territories, for a total worldwide gross of $1,158,895.

==== Australia ====
In Australia it made A$368,642 (US$257,216) from 114 screens including previews and festival screenings, in its opening weekend, finishing tenth at the box office grossing A$485,825 ($338,979) in the week ending 7 July. It made another A$179,000 ($125,772) from 79 screens in its second weekend with a 51% decrease from the first week; finishing thirteenth and grossing A$761,000 ($534,167) through 11 days. On its third weekend the film made A$83,000 ($58,678) from 55 screens finishing seventeenth grossing a total of A$893,000 (US$628,874). After the fourth week of release, the film shown on 61 screens had a total of A$988,000 crossing the A$1 million mark before the following weekend. On its ninth week at the end of August it was played on 10 screens grossing a total of A$1,141,000.

==== Other territories ====
On its first weekend in New Zealand it made US$8,713 across 21 screens. It made another $1,329 from 7 screens on its second weekend. By its fifth week it had grossed a total of $14,699. In the United Kingdom it made £62,776 ($81,453) from 8 cinemas with an average of £7,847 ($10,182) per screen in its opening weekend, finishing twelfth at the box office. It made another £10,146 ($13,021) in its second weekend, with the film added to 3 screens over the previous week for a total of 11; grossing £79,199 ($101,641) through 12 days. In its third weekend it made £4,578 ($5,929) shown on 9 cinemas, and in its fourth weekend the film fell 72% to £1,434 ($1,834) screened at 4 cinemas. On its fifth weekend it made £1,353, a drop of 6% and on its sixth it made £621 on 3 cinemas. On its seventh weekend it made £3,139, a 405% increase of over the previous week to have a U.K. box office total of £110,345 ($142,767).

=== Critical response ===
Upon its premiere at the 2019 Tribeca Film Festival, the film received positive reviews from critics. On review aggregator Rotten Tomatoes, the film holds an approval rating of 100% based on 41 reviews, with an average rating of 7.4/10. The site's critical consensus reads, "Engrossing for casual listeners as well as hardcore fans, Mystify: Michael Hutchence sheds a poignant light on a life and career cut short by tragedy." Metacritic assigned the film a weighted average score of 73 out of 100, based on 8 critics, indicating "generally favorable reviews".

Variety film critic Katherine Turman described it as "While Mystify in many ways amplifies the tragedy of Hutchence's death, it also goes a long way toward explaining and humanizing it." In a positive review for Vogue, Laird Borrelli-Persson wrote "Mystify is proof that Hutchence was, and is, much loved. Also missed, in excess." Graham Fuller of Screen International called the film a "Stand-out documentary" and wrote, "The densely woven and worshipfully presented archival footage of the INXS frontman, on stage and off, is a reminder that in terms of wild talent and Dionysian sexiness, he belongs in the same company as Mick Jagger, Jim Morrison, and Robert Plant." He concludes: "What lifts it above the majority of documentaries about celebrities and artists is its extraordinary intimacy." Harry Windsor, writing for the Hollywood Reporter, said: "It should prove essential viewing for the subject's fans: a tender portrait of the man's highs and lows that sheds new light on the broken years that directly preceded his suicide at 37."

Leigh Paatsch writing for the Herald Sun gave the film 4/5 stars, saying: "Quite wisely, the new documentary Mystify: Michael Hutchence doesn't concern itself with smoothing out all the erroneous wrinkles that have crumpled the late INXS frontman's life story over time." Karl Quinn of The Age called the film Lowenstein's "slow-burning labour of love." The Australian's David Stratton summed up the film as "a terrific documentary, and as complete a portrait of this talented singer as you could wish." calling it "a detailed and revealing portrait"; he rated the film four out of five stars. Vicky Roach from The Daily Telegraph gave the film 3 out of 5, saying: "While it’s more visually interesting, there are times when this storytelling device results in a kind of emotional disconnect. And although they corroborate Lowenstein’s version of events, the band’s role in Hutchence’s story feels strangely under-amplified — emotionally and musically." She summed up the film as "A measured, personal, densely woven account of the man behind the myth." DM Bradley, writing for the Adelaide Review, said: "Richard Lowenstein’s beautifully sad documentary study of the all-too-short life of his late friend Michael Hutchence is a most moving memorial, and rather more about the man than the music."

Graeme Tuckett from Stuff.co.nz gave the film 3.5 out of 5 stars, saying: "Mystify is unapologetically one for the fans. But, seeing it as someone who thought he didn't particularly care about Hutchence's story, I was moved." Eddie Harrison of The List awarded the film 4 out of 5 stars, remarking that "Mystify can only be a cautionary tale, yet there's plenty of evidence that Hutchence was an electrifying performer in his prime." Time Out’s, Philip De Semlyen described it "As the tragedy unfolds, there's a strange solace in seeing this captivating enigma somehow emerging intact", giving it 4 out of 5 marks. The Sunday Times Edward Porter gave it three out of five stars, wrote "There are insights into the gloomy later years, but it's memorable chiefly for its envy-inducing picture of the upside of being a rock star."

=== Accolades ===
Award	Date of ceremony	Category	Recipients	Result	Ref.
AACTA Awards	4 December 2019	Best Documentary	Mystify: Michael Hutchence	Nominated	
AACTA Awards	4 December 2019	Best Editing in a Documentary	Mystify: Michael Hutchence	Nominated	
AACTA Awards	4 December 2019	Best Sound in a Documentary	Mystify: Michael Hutchence	Nominated	
ASSG	December 2019	Best Sound for a Documentary	Mystify: Michael Hutchence	Won	
BFI London Film Festival	2–13 October 2019	Best feature-length documentary (Grierson Award)	Mystify: Michael Hutchence	Nominated	
FCCA	2020	Best Feature Documentary	Mystify: Michael Hutchence	Nominated	
Tribeca Film Festival	2 May 2019	Best Documentary Feature	Mystify: Michael Hutchence	Nominated	

- ASSG Best Sound for a Documentary: Robert Mackenzie - Re-Recording Mixer & Sound Designer, Simon Rosenberg - Dialogue Editor, Mick Boraso - Sound Designer, Lynn-Maree Milburn - Additional Sound Designer.

==== Voter nominated ====
The film was nominated for Best Music Film at the NME Awards on 12 February 2020.

== See also ==
- List of Australian films of 2019
- List of documentary films
- INXS
