= Peaches Geldof =

British journalist, television presenter, and model (1989–2014)

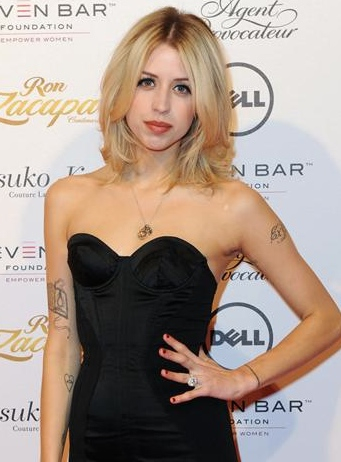
- Geldof in November 2012
- Born: Peaches Honeyblossom Geldof; 13 March 1989; London, England
- Died: 7 April 2014 (aged 25); Wrotham, Kent, England
- Occupations: Columnist; television personality; model
- Years active: 2004–2014
- Height: 5 ft 7 in (1.70 m)
- Spouses: Max Drummey (m. 2008; div. 2011); Thomas Cohen (m. 2012)
- Children: 2
- Parents: Bob Geldof (father); Paula Yates (mother)
- Relatives: Pixie Geldof (sister); Tiger Hutchence-Geldof (half-sister); Hughie Green (maternal grandfather)

Peaches Honeyblossom Geldof (13 March 1989 – 7 April 2014) (Note: Geldof's body was discovered at her home at around 13:30 on Monday 7 April 2014, and initial media reports gave this as the date of her death. Evidence presented at the inquest included the possibility that she had died after 20:00 on Sunday 6 April 2014.) was an English columnist, television personality, and model.

Born and raised in London, Geldof was educated at Queen's College after her parents' divorce in 1996, and later moved to New York City, where she was a writer for the UK edition of Elle Girl magazine. She also worked in television, producing and developing her own television programmes which were broadcast in the United Kingdom in 2006. In the later part of her life, Geldof worked primarily in modelling and television, and gave birth to sons in 2012 and 2013.

Geldof was found dead at her home in 2014; the inquest found that she died of a heroin overdose.

== Early life ==
Peaches Geldof was born in London on 13 March 1989, the second daughter of Bob Geldof and Paula Yates, and granddaughter of Hughie Green. She had two sisters, Fifi Trixibelle Geldof (born 1983) and Little Pixie Geldof (born 1990), and also one half-sister, Heavenly Hiraani Tiger Lily Hutchence-Geldof (born 1996).

She grew up in Chelsea, London, and Faversham, and was educated at Queen's College, London. After moving out of her father's house at the age of eighteen, she rented a flat in Islington. She completed her A-Levels and was accepted at Queen Mary University of London, where she planned to study English literature and journalism, but deferred it to move to New York City with her then-husband, Max Drummey.

== Career ==
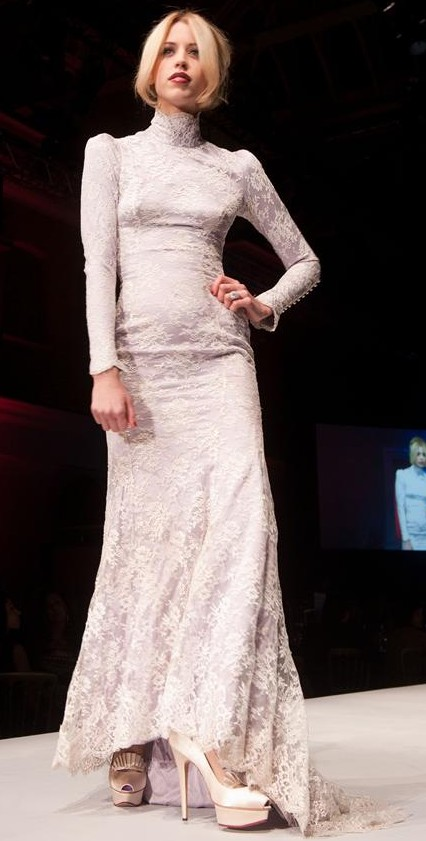
Geldof modelling at Lingerie London Event in November 2012

Geldof wrote a magazine column for the UK edition of Elle Girl, starting with its April 2004 issue and continuing until the magazine folded in October 2005. From the ages of 14 to 17, she wrote a weekly socio-political column for The Daily Telegraph, and numerous articles for The Guardian.

In 2005, she wrote and presented a documentary television programme, Peaches Geldof: Teenage Spirit, which was followed by Peaches Geldof: Teen America, which aired on Sky One on 1 March 2006. In 2006, Geldof was placed at number seven in the Tatler's list of Top Ten Fashion Icons for the year, the youngest person on the list. In 2007, readers of FHM voted her the 53rd sexiest woman in the world.

In September 2007, she made her catwalk début modelling for PPQ at London Fashion Week. She was also announced as the face of the Australian fashion line Dotti. Premiering on 19 October 2008 was Peaches: Disappear Here, an MTV One reality series in which she founded a new youth-oriented magazine.

In 2009, she was signed to a six-figure modelling deal to become the face of the Miss Ultimo collection. In 2010 she was dropped from Ultimo after nude pictures and allegations of drug use were posted on the Internet and published in the media. Geldof denied the claims and said, "I am disappointed that Ultimo has decided not to extend my contract based on a wildly exaggerated account of a night in Los Angeles five months ago." Michelle Mone, the head of Ultimo underwear, said that "as a brand that targets young women, we feel it is impossible for Peaches to continue".

In 2011, Geldof presented a six-part ITV2 series called OMG! with Peaches Geldof, a magazine-format chat and guest show with audience participation.

== Personal life ==
In 2000, when she was 11 years old, her mother died of a heroin overdose at the age of 41. In a 2013 interview with Elle magazine, Geldof explained how difficult coming to terms with her mother's death was:

I remember the day my mother died, and it's still hard to talk about it. I just blocked it out. I went to school the next day because my father's mentality was "keep calm and carry on". So we all went to school and tried to act as if nothing had happened. But it had happened. I didn't grieve. I didn't cry at her funeral. I couldn't express anything because I was just numb to it all. I didn't start grieving for my mother properly until I was maybe 16.

On 5 August 2008, Geldof married Max Drummey, an American musician from the band Chester French, at A Little White Wedding Chapel in Las Vegas. On 7 February 2009, the couple announced that they had amicably decided to end their marriage. In April 2011, Drummey filed for divorce in Los Angeles, citing irreconcilable differences.

For a while in 2010, she lived in the same house in Los Angeles as Christina Curry, the daughter of former MTV veejay Adam Curry and Dutch singer Patricia Paay. Plans for the two to make a reality television series for MTV were aborted for unknown reasons.

In June 2011, Geldof became engaged to Thomas Cohen, lead singer of the London band S.C.U.M. They were married on 8 September 2012, at the same church in Davington, Kent, where her parents married 26 years earlier, and also where her mother's funeral was held in 2000. Geldof had two sons with Cohen, born in 2012 and 2013.

Geldof professed to being a Scientologist during a 2009 interview with Fearne Cotton for the documentary series When Fearne Met Peaches Geldof, and in November that year she attended the 25th anniversary of the International Association of Scientologists at Saint Hill Manor in East Grinstead, West Sussex. She later explored aspects of Judaism, and in 2013 began to express interest in Ordo Templi Orientis (O.T.O.), describing it as "a belief system to apply to day-to-day life to attain peacefulness". She had the initials OTO tattooed on her left forearm. She also revealed that she identified as a Thelemite, an adherent of Aleister Crowley's religion, Thelema.

In 2013, Geldof released details via her Twitter account that risked identifying victims of former Lostprophets lead singer and convicted child sex offender Ian Watkins, leading her to have to make a public apology.

== Death ==
On 7 April 2014, Geldof was found dead at her home in Wrotham, Kent. The police found and seized drug paraphernalia at the house. Bob Geldof said in a statement: "We are beyond pain. She was the wildest, funniest, cleverest, wittiest and the most bonkers of all of us. We loved her and will cherish her forever." Her widower Thomas Cohen said in a statement: "My beloved wife Peaches was adored by myself and her two sons Astala and Phaedra and I shall bring them up with their mother in their hearts every day."

Geldof's funeral took place on 21 April 2014 at St Mary Magdalene and St Lawrence Church in Davington, Kent, the same church where she was married, where her parents were married, and where her mother's funeral service was held. The private service was attended by her father, husband, other family and friends and various members of the UK entertainment and fashion industries.

=== Inquest ===
The inquest opened into Geldof's death at Gravesend Old Town Hall on 1 May 2014. On 23 July, the coroner found that the cause of her death was opioid intoxication, and recorded a verdict of drug-related death. There was no evidence it was deliberate. Geldof had been taking the maintenance drug methadone for two and a half years before her death. She had started taking heroin again in February 2014, and 6.9 grams (1/4 oz) of the drug was found in the house. On 3 July 2015, Kent Police announced that they had ended the investigation into her death, as they had "exhausted all lines of inquiry" trying to find out who had supplied Geldof with the Class A drug.
