= Patricia Glassop =

Australian film and television makeup artist

- Born: Patricia Agnes Kennedy; 6 July 1926; Australia
- Died: 21 September 2010 (aged 84); Brisbane, Queensland, Australia
- Occupations: Film and television makeup artist and author
- Spouse(s): Kelland Hutchence (m. 1960; div. 1977) Ross Glassop (m. 1991)
- Children: 3, including Michael Hutchence
- Relatives: Tiger Hutchence-Geldof (granddaughter)

Patricia Agnes Glassop (née Kennedy) (6 July 1926 – 21 September 2010), also professionally known as Patricia Hutchence, was an Australian film and television makeup artist, and was the mother of INXS frontman Michael Hutchence and grandmother of Hutchence’s daughter, Tiger Hutchence-Geldof. In later years she was an author.

== Biography ==
Patricia Agnes Kennedy was born on 6 July 1926. In her teens, she became a model and carried on modeling up to her thirties. She was first married at the age of eighteen. A year later, she gave birth to a daughter, Tina. She later divorced her first husband, whose name is not a matter of public record.

She subsequently married her second husband Kelland Hutchence. On 22 January 1960, her first son Michael was born. Two years later, her second son Rhett was born. The family moved to Hong Kong when son Michael was four years old and stayed there until he was twelve years old.

In 1966, while still living in Hong Kong, both Patricia and her daughter Tina became involved in the film Strange Portrait, starring Jeffrey Hunter. Patricia had the makeup artist job and Tina had a small part in the film. Fellow Australian Terry Bourke was involved with the production of the film. The film, however, never saw release.

In 1970, she worked as makeup and hair stylist in the film Noon Sunday. It was her second time working with Bourke.

Her marriage to Hutchence lasted seventeen years. In 1991, aged 62, she married Ross Glassop, a retired pilot who was in the Royal Australian Air Force.

== Death ==
She died, aged 84, on 21 September 2010. She was survived by two of her three children: Tina and Rhett.

== Author ==
=== As Patricia Glassop ===
- Caring for the family's future : a practical guide to identification and management of perinatal anxiety and depression by Bryanne Barnett, Cathrine Fowler, Patricia Glossop - ISBN 0949324973 Chipping Norton, N.S.W. : Surrey Beatty & Sons Pty Ltd, c2004
- Just a man : the real Michael Hutchence by Tina Hutchence and Patricia Glassop - ISBN 0283063564 London : Sidgwick & Jackson, 2000

=== As Patricia Hutchence ===
- Make-up is magic by Patricia Hutchence ISBN 0949773875 (paperback) - Crows Nest, N.S.W. : Little Hills Press, 1988
  Hardcover title - Make-up is magic, For the 1920s to now, corrective, fantasy and fun ISBN 0949773824

== Makeup and hair stylist ==
Television
Title	Episode	Director	Date	Role	Notes #
The Young Doctors	Episode #1.1		1976	Makeup artist	As Pat Kennedy
The Young Doctors	Episode #1.2 to Episode #1.36		1976	Makeup artist	38 episodes uncredited?
The Young Doctors	Episode #1.40		1976	Makeup artist	As Pat Kennedy
The Young Doctors	"Episode #1.1396"		1983	Makeup artist	As Pat Hutchence
Sons and Daughters	Various episodes		1983	Makeup artist	As Patricia Hutchence

Film
Title	Director	Year	Role	Notes #
Strange Portrait	Jeffrey Stone	1976	Makeup artist	as Pat Hutchence
Noon Sunday	Terry Bourke	1970	Makeup artist, hair stylist	
And Millions Will Die	Leslie H. Martinson	1973	Makeup artist	As Pat Hutchence
Death Race 2000	Paul Bartel	1975	Makeup artist	As Pat Hutchence
The Great Texas Dynamite Chase	Michael Pressman	1976	Makeup artist	As Pat Hutchence
Cat Murkil and the Silks	John A. Bushelman	1976	Makeup artist	As Pat Hutchence

Video
Title	Director	Year	Role	Notes #
Better the Devil You Know	Paul Goldman	1990	Makeup artist	Kylie Minogue music video
