= Full Moon, Dirty Hearts =

Studio album by INXS
- Released: 1 November 1993
- Recorded: November 1992 – October 1993
- Studios: Capri Digital Studios, Capri
- Genre: Rock
- Length: 39:51
- Label: EastWest
- Producers: Mark Opitz, INXS

INXS chronology
Welcome to Wherever You Are (1992)	Full Moon, Dirty Hearts (1993)	The Greatest Hits (1994)

Singles from Full Moon, Dirty Hearts
- 1. "The Gift" Released: 1 October 1993; 2. "Please (You Got That ...)" Released: 15 November 1993; 3. "Time" Released: 24 January 1994; 4. "Freedom Deep" Released: 18 April 1994

Full Moon, Dirty Hearts is the ninth studio album by Australian rock band INXS. It was released on 2 November 1993, through East West Records in Australia, in the United Kingdom by Phonogram's Mercury Records label, and by Atlantic Records in the United States. The album drew mixed reviews, and sold less than previous works. The straight-ahead rock sound of the album was compared to the Rolling Stones by several reviewers, especially with reference to their 1972 album Exile on Main St., seen as a return to basics. Full Moon, Dirty Hearts was followed by the Dirty Honeymoon world tour of 1993–1994.

"Please (You Got That ...)" featured vocals by Ray Charles and was released as a single. The title track featured vocals by the Pretenders lead singer, Chrissie Hynde.

The band's manager, Chris Murphy, arranged to shoot videos for every song on the album. Twelve videos were shot on a small budget by twelve up-and-coming Australian directors.

The Japanese edition of the album included a cover of Steppenwolf's "Born to Be Wild", which was specially recorded for the April 1993 launch of Virgin Radio in the UK.

== Background ==
As INXS were finishing their previous studio album Welcome to Wherever You Are, they decided not to tour; instead the group recorded a follow-up album, then toured for both albums.

Following the release of Welcome to Wherever You Are, the band spent the next few months promoting the album across various countries in Europe, including the UK, France and Sweden. While promoting the album in Europe, vocalist Michael Hutchence visited then-girlfriend Helena Christensen in her home city of Copenhagen in Denmark. The couple were returning home on their bikes one night when Hutchence, who was standing in an alley with his bike, was punched from behind by a taxi driver and fell to the ground, hitting his head on the curb. He sustained a fractured skull and suffered the loss of his senses of smell and taste, and spent two weeks recovering in a Copenhagen hospital. In the unofficial biography Michael Hutchence: A Tragic Rock & Roll Story, Australian author Vince Lovegrove wrote, "It had a very strange effect on Michael. The injury also caused the singer to act erratically, abusively and to suffer insomnia". These conditions had an impact on the production of Full Moon, Dirty Hearts.

== Recording and production ==
The album was written soon after the release and promotion of the band's previous album, Welcome to Wherever You Are, at the end of November 1992. The album was recorded and produced at Capri Studio on the Isle of Capri in Italy, and completed in February 1993. The Capri Studio had just re-opened during the recording of Welcome to Wherever You Are and after spotting an ad for it in a trade magazine, Hutchence and producer Mark Opitz insisted that the band should record their next record there. Rehearsals for Full Moon, Dirty Hearts took place at Hutchence's villa in the south of France in October 1992 where the group were often distracted by other celebrities and supermodels who Hutchence regularly invited. The group decided to set off to the Isle of Capri early, arriving on the island one month after rehearsals. The journey was long and tiring for all members of the band as it took them almost two days of travelling to get there. Once on the island, each member of the band received their own villa, with the studio itself located close by; the studio sat atop a steep cliff, overlooking the Bay of Naples. Guitarist and saxophonist Kirk Pengilly recalls, "It was like a five-star Alcatraz". Hutchence and Opitz shared a villa on the island with Hutchence living upstairs and Opitz living downstairs.

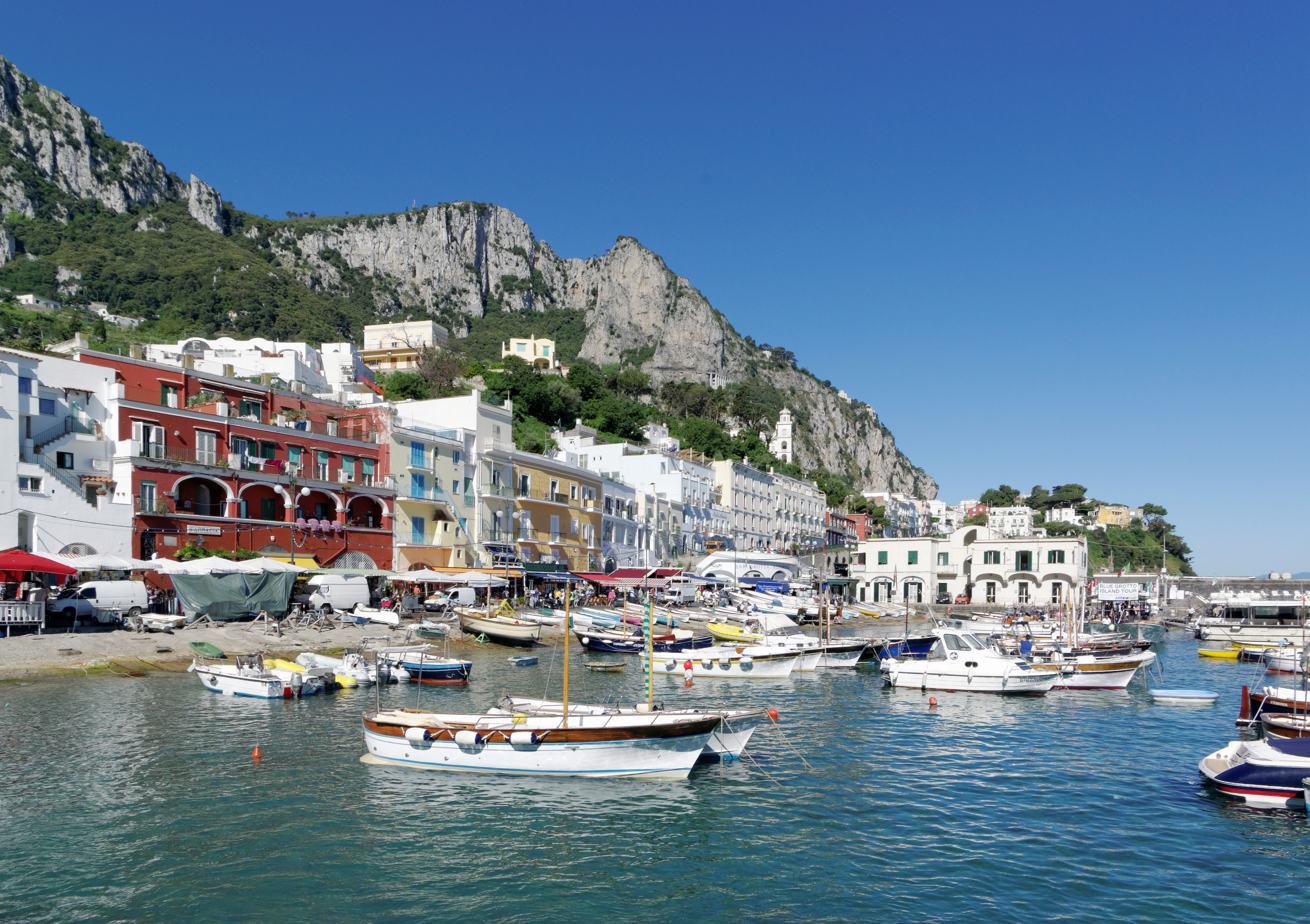
Full Moon, Dirty Hearts was recorded on the Isle of Capri.

Hutchence's condition raised concerns throughout the recording process. At first he became distraught about being isolated on the island. On the first night, Opitz was awakened at four a.m. to the sound of furniture being smashed upstairs by Hutchence. During one session, Hutchence threatened to stab bassist Gary Beers with a knife after the two had a dispute. Songwriter and multi-instrumentalist Andrew Farriss recalls another incident where Hutchence shoved his microphone straight through the strings of an acoustic guitar while shouting, "We need more aggression on this track!" In the band's 2005 official autobiography – INXS: Story to Story, Pengilly recalls, "Michael had very violent moments. He threw his microphone stand around inside the studio, and he threw violent tantrums all the time". The group took a one-month break for the Christmas period, allowing Hutchence time to recover from his condition and the rest of the band time to spend with their families. Before breaking for the Christmas holidays, the band got half of the album completed. Hutchence returned to his estate in France, later joining Farriss in London to write the last remaining songs for the album.

At the start of the New Year, Hutchence and Farriss returned to the Isle of Capri one week earlier along with Opitz and engineer Niven Garland. Upon returning to the sessions in Capri, Hutchence's behaviour had progressively returned to normal. While riding the hour and a half journey on the ferry from Naples to Capri, Hutchence began writing the lyrics for the album's title track. Chrissie Hynde from the Pretenders would perform the song along with Hutchence. As the remaining members of INXS were preparing to return to the island, Hutchence, Farriss, Opitz and Garland managed to get six more tracks for the album finished including, "Days of Rust", "Please (You Got That...)", "Freedom Deep", "Kill the Pain", "Viking Juice" and the title track. Production of the album came to an end in late February 1993 with everyone spending the final night capturing ideas and doing last minute touch ups on some of the tracks. The following morning, INXS caught the morning ferry back to Naples to prepare for their journey to Paris to carry out additional work on the album. Opitz took the recording tapes to Los Angeles where he mixed them with mixing engineer Bob Clearmountain. Clearmountain previously engineered and mixed the band's best selling album, Kick.

While recording overdubs at a studio in Paris, Hutchence and Farriss discovered that Ray Charles was recording at the same studio. The pair asked his engineer if Charles would be interested in recording vocals on two tracks for the album, "Make Your Peace" and "Please (You Got That...)". Charles passed on "Make Your Peace" because he thought the key was too high for his voice but he agreed to perform vocals on "Please (You Got That...)". The duet between Hutchence and Charles took place at Charles' own recording studio in Los Angeles. Charles agreed to appear in the song's music video and would also perform the song live with INXS (a few days before the album's release) on the Late Show with David Letterman. The mixing of the album was completed by Opitz in July back on Capri while the band were touring some of the new songs on their Get Out of the House tour throughout the spring and summer.

== Composition ==
Following the experimentation of Welcome to Wherever You Are, INXS' aim for Full Moon, Dirty Hearts was to return to the rock sound of their earliest work. The album is raw and stripped-down with a noisy, rootsy sound, and largely comprises visceral rock songs. Greg Kot considered the album "bolder" than its predecessor, saying that its "loose mix of dirty guitars and warped ambiance" borrows elements of hip hop, techno and grunge. According to critic J.D. Considine, the group's rhythmic backbone had shifted from classic funk to "hip hop-inflected grooves", albeit with a stronger soul element in the songs. The Sydney Morning Herald commented that "the dance songs have more groove and the ballads have more soul." Some compared the album to U2, with Vox's Andrew Mueller opining that the album sounds like "an attempt to bring off the sort of reinvention and revival that U2 had accomplished with Achtung Baby." Ira Robbins of Trouser Press also likened the "panels of thick mechanical guitar distortion, fuzzed bass and weird-snare veneer" on "The Gift", "Days of Rust", "Time" and "Viking Juice (The End of Rock & Roll)" to the band.

The album opens energetically with "Days of Rust", which has been compared to Midnight Oil and the Rolling Stones, with "Time" also evoking the latter band. "The Gift" is an industrial rock song, whose persistent industrial bassline and distorted guitars lend it an hypnotic quality. The music has been compared to Nine Inch Nails, while Hutchence's vocals were compared to U2's "The Fly". "Make Your Peace" and "I'm Only Looking" feature funk rock repetition. The latter song has been compared to the "jagged funk" of David Bowie's mid-1970s Thin White Duke era, with spoken word segments reminiscent of Jim Morrison. The Sydney Morning Herald grouped "Days of Rust", "Make Your Peace" and "It's Only Time" as the closest INXS had come to heavy rock.

The funky blues rock song "Please (You Got That...)" is a duet between Hutchence and soul singer Ray Charles, with a sound that has also been compared to the Rolling Stones. One of several diversions from the record's driving sound, the title track is a sensuous, blues-influenced duet between Hutchence and Chrissie Hynde, described by Jon O'Brien of Classic Pop as "barroom blues" and a "whisky-soaked requiem". A further departure from the album's rock sound, "Freedom Deep" is an Eastern-flavoured, piano-based ballad, commencing with a section of ambience before developing into a panoramic rock song. The Eastern instrumentation provides the song's hypnotic effect. "Kill the Pain" is another piano ballad, with dense production and anguished vocals. "Cut Your Roses" embellishes a hip hop groove with horns, while "The Messenger" is a grungy song. Spoken vocals also drive the psychedelic closing song, "Viking Juice (The End of Rock & Roll)".

== Reception ==
Professional ratings
Review scores
Source	Rating
All Music Guide to Rock	1/5 stars
Calgary Herald	B+
Chicago Tribune	3.5/4 stars
The Cincinnati Post	3.5/5 stars
Leader-Telegram	4.0/5 stars
MusicHound Rock	4/5
Philadelphia Daily News	3/4 stars
Q	4/5 stars
(The New) Rolling Stone Album Guide	3/5 stars
The Sydney Morning Herald	4/4 stars

Full Moon, Dirty Hearts received mixed reviews on its release. Andy Gill of The Independent said the album was "a return to rock music, pure and simple, with hard drums and big, dirty guitars". In his review for the 2002 book All Music Guide to Rock, Stephen Thomas Erlewine rated the album one star out of five and said, "Full Moon, Dirty Hearts sounds tired and as calculated as X." He concluded his review by stating, "INXS sounds energetic throughout the album, but the experimentation is poorly executed and there is a serious lack of strong songs and singles, apart from two duets: 'Please (You Got That ...)' with Ray Charles and the title track, which features Chrissie Hynde." Erlewine's one-star review was ported from the book to the AllMusic website in 2002, but after March 2024 the website changed the rating to two stars.

Billboard (magazine) Hailed, the Aussie rock giants again for making bold inroads into new sonic terrain. Initiating, Among the curve balls here are duets with Ray Charles and Chrissie Hyde - on "Please (You Got That...)" and title cut, respectively - and a track mixed by Brian Eno that bears his stamp, On the more conventional side, "The Gift," which is apt to appeal to Inxs' album rock and modern rock supporters." Entertainment Weekly "Wrote"-...FULL MOON DIRTY HEARTS is full of killer hooks. There's something in nearly every song that Jumps out at you, propulsive drum attacks, Jabbing bass lines, and, above all, flashes of lightning - sharp melody..." Rating: B."

Music Week gave the album four out of five stars, and described the rock-heavy style as the band taking "a step back" from their "flirtations with funk and pop sensibilities". The Accrington Observer, said "Thrilled To Excess" Writing a positive review of the Album. With no punches pulled it roars in with Days of Rust, a strong and heavy song which is vaguely reminiscent of Big Country, they wrote, this is the start of a rollercoaster ride of seriously sexy guitars, thumping drums and gut-wrenching bass lines designed purely to thrill."

Andrew Smith, writing for The Journal (Newcastle upon Tyne newspaper) was favorable in his review, praising the band for managing to still sound fresh and creative as well as highly professional. Yet he found, Inxs are at their best playing good rock 'n' roll and this release has plenty of it." Ian Gittins of Melody Maker Opined that "Inxs are exactly sly enough to surprise us", he advised. "Inxs are too thick-wristed to be ethereal, but Full Moon... has its joys. I'm only looking is oddly lovely, the lads dropping the blues-beat for a fluent funkstep which even slinks into fetching freeform jazz. Yowsa!" While ending his review more mixed, signaling even though there is no startling self-reinvention like U2, and the band sounding like they've been playing together for 17 years, he appreciated a few of the albums tracks. Vlado Forgac of The Morning Star (British Columbia newspaper) mentions, This Australian sextet is now showing remarkable signs of growth and maturity while refusing to remain dormant. He called the album a winner."

Giving the album four stars out of five, Q hailed it as excellent", writing: "[Full Moon is] tougher - sounding and more aggressive than anything previously bearing [INXS] name...it's still got weird corners and makes the best job yet of capturing the vitality of INXS' live performance...". While noting the competent playing and expensive production, Select's Clark Collis complained that the record lacks decent songs, writing that "the band succeed in promoting an atmosphere of been there, done that". In his NME review, Paul Moody opined that the band attempts to be "hip", as evident by the 'manful' content, the monochrome sleeve photos and handwritten track listing. However, Moody believed that, "desperate as INXS are to create a mood of U2-like Euro-chic, they are unable to write a decent lyric or a song that resists the temptation to be overblown", adding that even Brian Eno failed to contribute the desired "weirdness" to "I'm Only Looking".

Writing for The Daily Telegraph, Tony Parsons opined that this was the band's "most exciting album for years", comparing it to the Rolling Stones' Exile on Main St. as both albums represent "the sound of a band getting back to the greasy basics". Parsons concludes that "Full Moon, Dirty Hearts is INXS at their stomping best." The Press (York) announced, The Aussie rockers have really got back to the basics for the recording of this long player: It includes a couple of stunning duets: They ended the review positive, giving the release an 'Excellent' 4 out of 4 stars."

Music critic J. D. Considine of The Baltimore Sun said in his review. "There's plenty of edge to the material here, from the dense, dark throb of 'The Gift' to the grungy, Stones-like snarl of 'The Messenger, ' but that hardly takes away from the music's melodic appeal." Considine continued, "it's the bands freshest sounding effort in ages." Greg Kot of the Chicago Tribune wrote in his review that, "like the Stones at their peak, INXS takes bits of what's hot – grunge, techno, hip-hop – and makes it their own. The loose mix of dirty guitars and warped ambiance, plus winning cameos by Ray Charles and Chrissie Hynde, makes "Full Moon, Dirty Hearts" the equal of anything INXS has ever released."

Philadelphia Daily News's Chuck Arnold compared INXS to the Rolling Stones, writing that on "lively, live-sounding cuts like 'Days of Rust,' 'The Gift' and 'The Messenger,' they tear it up like a rough-and-rowdy bar band getting paid with all the beer they can drink." Arnold said that the album shows "that Hutchence still has, unequivocally, one of the best voices in modern rock." Jim Farber of the New York Daily News suggested that "Full Moon, Dirty Hearts, was the bands most charged work since "Kick" in 1987. He noted nine of the Album's 12 cuts feature dance-worthy grooves, and nearly all the choruses prove catchy."

=== Commercial performance ===
Full Moon, Dirty Hearts entered the Billboard Top 200 in November 1993. It peaked at number 53 and lasted only five weeks in the charts. The album did perform better outside the States having charted at number 3 in the United Kingdom and number 4 in Australia, earning Gold certifications in both countries. The music video for "The Gift", featuring Gulf War and Holocaust footage, was banned by MTV, who had previously been supportive of the group.

== Track listing ==
All tracks are written by Andrew Farriss and Michael Hutchence, except where noted.

Full Moon, Dirty Hearts track listing
No.	Title	Writer(s)	Length
1.	"Days of Rust"		3:08
2.	"The Gift"	Jon Farriss, Michael Hutchence and Kirk Pengilly	4:03
3.	"Make Your Peace"		2:40
4.	"Time"		2:52
5.	"I'm Only Looking"		3:31
6.	"Please (You Got That...)" (featuring Ray Charles)		3:02
7.	"Full Moon, Dirty Hearts" (featuring Chrissie Hynde)		3:29
8.	"Freedom Deep"		3:59
9.	"Kill the Pain"		3:00
10.	"Cut Your Roses Down"		3:28
11.	"The Messenger"		3:28
12.	"Viking Juice"		3:11
Total length:			39:51

Bonus track on Japanese edition
No.	Title	Writer(s)	Length
13.	"Born to Be Wild"	Mars Bonfire	3:51

== Personnel ==
Personnel as listed in the album's liner notes are:

INXS

- Michael Hutchence – vocals
- Andrew Farriss – keyboards, guitars
- Tim Farriss – guitars
- Kirk Pengilly – guitars, saxophone, vocals
- Garry Gary Beers – bass, vocals
- Jon Farriss – drums, percussion, vocals

Additional musicians

- John Kirk – trumpet on "I'm Only Looking"
- Ray Charles – vocals on "Please (You Got That...)"
- Chrissie Hynde – vocals on "Full Moon, Dirty Hearts"

Production

- Mark Opitz – producer, mixing (2, 4, 6, 7, 8, 10, 12)
- INXS – producers, front cover design
- Chris Kimsey – vocal producer (7)
- Bob Clearmountain – mixing (1, 3, 9, 10)
- Niven Garland – engineer, mixing (2, 4, 6, 7, 8, 10, 12)
- Brian Eno – mixing (5)
- Max Carola – assistant engineer
- Ben Fenner – assistant engineer
- Alex Firla – assistant engineer
- Bruce Keen – assistant engineer
- Pete Lewis – assistant engineer
- John Mansey – assistant engineer
- Melissa Van Twest – assistant engineer
- Randy Wine – assistant engineer
- Kevin Metcalfe – mastering engineer
- Michael Nash – design
- Enrique Badulescu – front cover photography
- Garry Beers – inside photography
- Leslie Farriss – inside photography
- Katerina Jebb – inside photography

Studios

- Additional recording and mixing at Studio Guillaume Tell (Suresnes, France); Olympic Studios and Westside Studios (London, UK); A&M Studios (Hollywood, California, US).
- Mastered at The Town House (London, UK).

== Charts and certifications ==
=== Weekly charts ===
Weekly chart performance for Full Moon, Dirty Hearts
Chart (1993–1994)	Peak position
Australian Albums (ARIA)	4
Austrian Albums (Ö3 Austria)	18
Dutch Albums (Album Top 100)	70
German Albums (Offizielle Top 100)	27
New Zealand Albums (RMNZ)	36
Norwegian Albums (VG-lista)	14
Swedish Albums (Sverigetopplistan)	8
Swiss Albums (Schweizer Hitparade)	9
UK Albums (Official Charts)	3
US Billboard 200	53

=== Sales and certifications ===
Sales and certifications for Full Moon, Dirty Hearts
Region	Certification	Certified units/sales
Australia (ARIA)	Gold	35,000^{^}
United Kingdom (BPI)	Gold	100,000^{^}
United States	—	152,000
^{^} Shipments figures based on certification alone.
