= Andrea Dotti =

Andrea Dotti may refer to:

- Andrea Dotti (psychiatrist) (1938–2007), Italian psychiatrist, second husband of Audrey Hepburn
- Andrea Dotti (priest) (1256–1315), Italian Servite preacher
