= Tiger Hutchence-Geldof =

English-Australian singer-songwriter (born 1996)

- Born: Heavenly Hiraani Tiger Lily Hutchence; 22 July 1996 (age 30); London, England
- Education: Goldsmiths, University of London
- Occupation: Singer-songwriter
- Years active: 2015–present
- Works: Tragic Tiger's Sad Meltdown (2022)
- Spouse: Ben Archer (m. 2025)
- Children: 1
- Parents: Michael Hutchence (father); Paula Yates (mother); Bob Geldof (adoptive father)
- Relatives: Peaches Geldof (half-sister); Pixie Geldof (half-sister); Patricia Glassop (biological paternal grandmother); Hughie Green (biological maternal grandfather)

Heavenly Hiraani Tiger Lily Hutchence-Geldof (born 22 July 1996), known professionally as Tiger Hutchence-Geldof (Note: Since 2019.) (formerly Tiger Lily Hutchence Geldof, Tiger Lily Hutchence-Geldof and Heavenly), is an English-Australian singer-songwriter and art psychotherapist. She is the daughter of Australian singer-songwriter Michael Hutchence and British TV presenter Paula Yates. After her parents died when she was a young child, she was legally adopted and raised alongside her three half-sisters by her mother's former husband, Irish singer-songwriter and activist Bob Geldof. She made her stage debut as a singer in 2020 and released her debut album, Tragic Tiger's Sad Meltdown, in 2022.

== Early life ==
Heavenly Hiraani Tiger Lily Hutchence-Geldof (née Heavenly Hiraani Tiger Lily Hutchence) was born in London, England, on 22 July 1996, to Michael Hutchence, the Australian lead singer of rock band INXS, and British TV presenter Paula Yates. She was born at home in the bathroom and her father helped with the delivery. Her half-sister Pixie chose the name "Heavenly"; Hutchence chose the name "Hiraani" after a family friend, it also being his favourite Polynesian word, meaning "Princess of the beautiful sky"; and Yates chose the name "Tiger Lily". Her parents called her "Tiger" and "Tiger Lily".

When she was one year old, her father died by suicide in Sydney, Australia, on 22 November 1997. After Hutchence's death, Yates suffered from depression and drug addiction, and fought against Hutchence's family, who wanted to take custody of their daughter. Her mother died of a drug overdose on 17 September 2000. Yates's body was discovered in the presence of Hutchence-Geldof, who was then four years old and was alone with her mother when she died.

The day after Yates's death, her ex-husband, Irish singer-songwriter and activist Bob Geldof, was granted temporary custody of Hutchence-Geldof so that she could be brought up with her three older half-sisters, Fifi, Peaches and Pixie. Hutchence's sister, Tina, also applied for custody of Hutchence-Geldof soon after Yates's death, but the judge rejected her counter-application to bring Hutchence-Geldof to live with her in California.

On 14 December 2000, Geldof was awarded full custody of Hutchence-Geldof, and she remained in London with him and her older half-sisters. Her paternal grandfather, Kell Hutchence, who had tried to gain temporary custody of Hutchence-Geldof in 1998 when Yates was being treated for depression at a clinic in London, supported the court's decision. In 2007, she was adopted by Geldof, who legally changed her surname, despite opposition from Hutchence's mother and sister. In 2008, her full legal name became Heavenly Hiraani Tiger Lily Hutchence Geldof. As of 2022, (Note: It is not clear exactly when it became her legal name.) her full legal name is Heavenly Hiraani Tiger Lily Hutchence-Geldof.

When she turned 18, she moved from London to New York to escape the spotlight on the Geldof family and to study drama. She postponed her acting studies following the death of her half-sister Peaches in 2014, under similar circumstances to their mother's death.

In 2019, she graduated from Goldsmiths, University of London, with a psychology degree.

== Career ==
In 2015, Hutchence-Geldof appeared in the film The Rise of the Krays and was credited as Tiger Lily Hutchence Geldof.

In 2016, she made her modeling debut for a charity cause for a Fairtrade-registered shirt factory in Southern India. She also worked as a photographer for the online fashion magazine Hunger.

She started using the name Tiger Hutchence-Geldof circa 2019.

In March 2020, she released on Bandcamp a 3-track EP titled Tragic Tiger's Sad Meltdown under the name "Heavenly".

In September 2020, she made her stage debut at the East Perth venue Barbes, where she performed original, melancholic alt-folk songs under the stage name "Heavenly".

In February 2022, she released her debut album, Tragic Tiger's Sad Meltdown, which features songs written after the 2014 death of her half-sister, Peaches Geldof. She recorded the album in Fremantle, Australia and released it under the name "Heavenly".

From April to May 2025, she held an art exhibition at the Big Yin Gallery in London under the name Tiger Hutchence-Geldof alongside Lily Gutierrez titled I Want More. On the gallery's website, she was described as "a musician and art psychotherapist".

== Personal life ==
Australian singer Nick Cave is her godfather.

After graduating from university in 2019, Hutchence-Geldof moved to Fremantle in Western Australia where she lived with her then-boyfriend, Australian musician Nick Allbrook, with whom she was in a relationship from 2017 to 2022. She moved back to the UK in 2023.

Hutchence-Geldof started dating British film director and model Ben Archer in 2023. They married on 12 April 2025 in London while Hutchence-Geldof was pregnant with the couple's first child, born a few months later.

== In popular culture ==
Michael Hutchence's 1999 posthumous self-titled solo album was dedicated to her.

INXS's 2006 single "God's Top Ten" was written by Andrew Farriss as a tribute to Hutchence and a gift for his daughter.

She was mentioned in the 2014 Australian biographical miniseries INXS: Never Tear Us Apart.

== Discography ==
- Tragic Tiger's Sad Meltdown (EP) (2020)
- Tragic Tiger's Sad Meltdown (2022)
