= Devil Inside (INXS song) =

1988 single by INXS

- Cover art for Australian edition

Single by INXS

from the album Kick
- B-side: "On the Rocks"
- Released: 8 February 1988
- Genre: New wave; funk rock; dance-rock
- Length: 5:11 (album version); 3:55 (single version)
- Label: WEA
- Songwriters: Andrew Farriss; Michael Hutchence
- Producer: Chris Thomas

INXS singles chronology
"New Sensation" (1987)	"Devil Inside" (1988)	"Never Tear Us Apart" (1988)

Music video
- "Devil Inside" on YouTube

"Devil Inside" is a song by Australian rock band INXS. It was written by Andrew Farriss and Michael Hutchence and was released as the second single (third in the UK) from the band's sixth studio album, Kick (1987), in February 1988. The song reached number two on the US Billboard Hot 100 for two weeks. "Devil Inside" also peaked at number six in Australia, number three in Canada, and number two in New Zealand.

== Critical reception ==
Cash Box stated that the band "[uses] a Daytripper-like guitar sound and riff it under a sultry, breathy vocal to put the point across." Pitchfork called it "state-of-the-art ’80s funk-pop played with enough charisma and volume for the cheap seats."

== Track listings ==
US 7-inch single

1. "Devil Inside" (5:11)
2. "On the Rocks" (3:05)

US 12-inch single

1. "Devil Inside" (remixed version) (6:36)
2. "Devil Inside" (edited version) (3:54)
3. "On the Rocks" (3:05)

== Charts ==
=== Weekly charts ===
Chart (1988)	Peak position
Australia (Australian Music Report)	6
Belgium (Ultratop 50 Flanders)	26
Canada Top Singles (RPM)	3
Ecuador (UPI)	2
Europe (Eurochart Hot 100)	67
France (SNEP)	20
Ireland (IRMA)	25
Italy Airplay (Music & Media)	16
Netherlands (Dutch Top 40 Tipparade)	6
Netherlands (Single Top 100)	41
New Zealand (Recorded Music NZ)	2
UK Singles (Official Charts)	47
US Billboard Hot 100	2
US Dance Singles Sales (Billboard)	32
US Mainstream Rock (Billboard)	2
US Cash Box Top 100	2
West Germany (GfK)	33

=== Year-end charts ===
Chart (1988)	Position
Canada Top Singles (RPM)	24
New Zealand (RIANZ)	46
US Billboard Hot 100	46
US Album Rock Tracks (Billboard)	13
US Cash Box Top 100	25

== Certifications ==
Region	Certification	Certified units/sales
New Zealand (RMNZ)	Gold	15,000^{‡}
^{‡} Sales+streaming figures based on certification alone.

== Release history ==
Region	Date	Format(s)	Label(s)	Ref.
Australia	8 February 1988	7-inch vinyl; 12-inch vinyl	WEA	
United Kingdom	22 February 1988	7-inch vinyl; 12-inch vinyl	Mercury; Phonogram	
United Kingdom	14 March 1988	CD	Mercury; Phonogram	
Japan	25 April 1988	Mini-CD	WEA	
