= DOTTi The Deity =

Nigerian singer

- Born: Okeowo Oladotun Alani; 20 July 1994 (age 32); Ibadan, Oyo State, Nigeria
- Origin: Oyo State, Nigeria
- Genres: Afrobeats; Neo-folk; Afro-soul
- Occupations: Singer-songwriter; performer
- Instrument: Vocals
- Years active: 2019–present

Okeowo Oladotun Alani (born 20 July 1994), professionally known as DOTTi The Deity, is a Nigerian singer and songwriter. He is known for the hit single “Forever Sweet”, which was released in 2022.

== Biography ==
A native of Ibadan, Oyo State, Oladotun was born on 20 July 1994. At a young age, due to separation from his parents, he had to relocate to Lagos State to live with his grandparents. He acquired his primary and secondary education in Lagos state. In 2013, he graduated with a National Diploma in Music Technology from The Polytechnic, Ibadan.

== Career ==
Oladotun was interested in music from an early age and started singing at the age of six. He officially started his music career in December 2019, with the launch of his first single, "Jolly Christmas", which was produced by Rotimikeys. The next year, during the COVID-19 pandemic, he released his first EP. titled Songs in Isolation. It comprised five songs, including "Social Distance", "Wura" and "Bilisi".

In 2021, Oladotun won the maiden edition of the MTN Y’ello music competition.

His single "Forever Sweet" was featured on the soundtrack of Breath of Life.

In May 2023, he launched his sophomore EP, For You Knew Me.

DOTTi (Okeowo Oladotun) won the 2025 Future Awards Africa Prize for Music for his artistry and contribution to music. He received the award at the 19th edition of the ceremony, which took place in Lagos on November 8, 2025.

== Discography ==
=== EPs/albums ===
List of albums, with selected details
Title	Album details
Songs in Isolation	Released: May 2020; Format: Digital download
For You Know Me	Released: May 2023; Format: Digital download
Madam Dearest Pt. 1	Released: June 2024; Format: Digital download

=== Singles ===
- "Jolly Christmas" (2019)
- "Forever Sweet" (2022)
- "Abeke" (2023)
- "For Time Heals" (2023)
- "Big shirt & boxers", ft. Reminisce (2024)
