= Stars on Sunday (TV series) =

British TV religious programme (1969–1979)

- Stars on Sunday title card
- Genre: Religious programming
- Created by: Jess Yates
- Presented by: Liz Fox (1969–1970); Jess Yates (1970–1973); Noele Gordon (1972–1978); Gracie Fields (1970–1979); Violet Carson (1970–1972); Harry Secombe (1969–1979) and others
- Country of origin: United Kingdom
- Original language: English

Production
- Producer: Jess Yates
- Production company: Yorkshire Television

Original release
- Network: ITV
- Release: 17 August 1969 – 13 May 1979

Related
- Choirs on Sunday; Highway

Stars on Sunday is a religious request programme produced by Yorkshire Television (YTV) and broadcast on the ITV network between 1969 and 1979. It aired on Sunday early evenings during what was known colloquially as the "God Slot", the time in television schedules set aside for religious broadcasting.

== Origin ==
Yorkshire Television executive and producer Jess Yates developed Stars on Sunday as a replacement for outgoing show, Choirs on Sunday. The new format was a religious variety show with sets of a house and grounds created in the YTV studios in Leeds. One backdrop was the towering west front of the house; other scenes took place in the grounds, a waterfall and lake, the rose garden, the hall of dreams, a ruined abbey and a paddock. The most substantial set was the Lady Chapel constructed around genuine stained-glass windows recovered from St John's Church, Bury, during demolition. Originally the windows had been exhibited at The Great Exhibition of 1851 in Hyde Park, London. When hosting the show Yates would be seated at an organ in front of the window. He gained the nickname "The Bishop" for his solemn delivery style.

Viewers wrote in to request hymns or Bible readings and these were performed by a series of guest celebrities.

== Success and popularity ==
A key element to the early success of the programme was Yates's ability to persuade UK and international celebrities to appear in the religious show for a small fraction of their normal fee. They were paid the minimum Equity fee of £49.

The programme was reported to have increased its viewing figures from 600,000 to around seven million at the peak of its success, although other reports cite regular audiences of more than 15 million.

Yates's contract with YTV was terminated in 1974 when it was revealed that he had been having an affair with young actress Anita Kay. He was separated from his wife at the time. The programme continued for another five years.

While a "significant" proportion of the inserts recorded for the programme survive, only a small number of complete editions are known to still exist.

== Guests ==
Guest hosts and contributors included:

- Moira Anderson
- Archbishop of Canterbury
- Archbishop of York
- Janet Baker
- Shirley Bassey
- Peter Sellers
- The Beverley Sisters
- Raymond Burr
- Patricia Cahill
- Violet Carson
- Bing Crosby
- Ken Dodd
- Doncaster Wheatsheaf Girls Choir
- Gracie Fields
- Maggie Fitzgibbon
- John Gielgud
- Gerald Harper
- Anita Harris
- Edward Heath
- Howard Keel
- Princess Grace of Monaco
- Eartha Kitt
- Christopher Lee
- James Mason
- Raymond Massey
- Johnny Mathis
- Keith Michell
- Matt Monro
- Earl Mountbatten of Burma
- Anna Neagle
- Roy Orbison
- Gene Pitney
- Cliff Richard
- Ralph Richardson
- Diana Rigg
- Harry Secombe
- Sandie Shaw
- Bill Simpson
- Dorothy Squires
- Kiri Te Kanawa
- Lovelace Watkins
- Norman Wisdom
