= Michael Hutchence =

Australian singer (1960–1997)

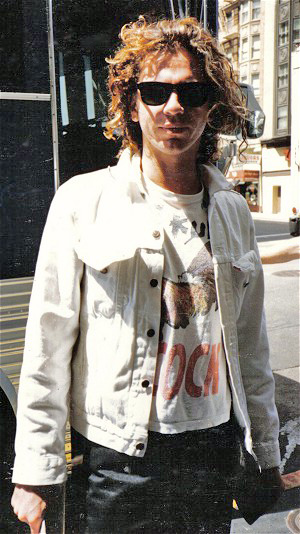
- Hutchence in 1986
- Born: 22 January 1960; Sydney, Australia
- Died: 22 November 1997 (aged 37); Sydney, Australia
- Cause of death: Suicide by hanging
- Occupations: Singer; songwriter
- Years active: 1977–1997
- Partner(s): Michele Bennett (1982–1987); Paula Yates (1995–1997)
- Children: Tiger Hutchence-Geldof
- Parents: Kelland Frank Hutchence (father); Patricia Glassop (mother)
- Musical career
- Genres: Rock; alternative rock; new wave; pop rock
- Instrument: Vocals
- Labels: Atco; Atlantic; Epic; Mercury; V2; Warner
- Formerly of: INXS; Max Q
- Website: michaelhutchence.com

Michael Kelland John Hutchence (22 January 1960 – 22 November 1997) was an Australian singer and songwriter. He was the co-founder, lead singer and lyricist of the rock band INXS from 1977 until his death in 1997. The band sold over 50 million records worldwide, making them one of Australia's highest-selling music acts of all time. INXS were inducted into the ARIA Hall of Fame in 2001.

Hutchence was also a member of the short-lived band Max Q. He recorded some solo material and acted in films such as Dogs in Space (1986) and Frankenstein Unbound (1990). Hutchence was known for his string of love affairs with actresses, models and singers, and his private life was often covered in the international press. He had a daughter, Tiger Hutchence-Geldof, with British television presenter Paula Yates. Hutchence died by suicide in a Sydney hotel room on 22 November 1997 at the age of 37.

== Early life ==
Michael Hutchence was born in the Crows Nest suburb of Sydney on 22 January 1960, the son of make-up artist Patricia Glassop and businessman Kelland Frank "Kell" Hutchence. He had an elder half-sister named Tina. His paternal grandparents were an English couple who had relocated to Sydney in 1922, while his maternal grandfather was from County Cork, Ireland.

Following Kell's business interests, the Hutchence family moved to Brisbane, where Hutchence's younger brother Rhett was born. They later left Australia for Hong Kong. During the early years in Hong Kong, both boys attended Glenealy Junior School and Beacon Hill School. Hutchence showed promise as a swimmer before badly breaking his arm. He then began to show interest in poetry and performed his first song in a local toy store commercial. He later attended King George V School during his early teens. The family returned to Sydney in 1972, buying a house in Belrose.

Hutchence attended Davidson High School, where he met and befriended Andrew Farriss. Around this time, the two spent a lot of time jamming with Farriss's brothers Tim and Jon in the garage. Farriss convinced Hutchence to join his band, Doctor Dolphin, alongside their classmates Kent Kerny and Neil Sanders. Bassist Garry Beers and drummer Geoff Kennelly from nearby Forest High School completed the line-up.

Hutchence's parents separated when he was 15 and he lived with his mother and half-sister in California for a short time in 1976. He later returned to Sydney with them. In 1977, a new band called the Farriss Brothers was formed with Andrew on keyboards, Tim on lead guitar and Jon on drums. Hutchence joined on vocals and Beers on bass, while Kirk Pengilly joined on guitar and saxophone. The band made their debut on 16 August 1977 at a venue in Whale Beach.

== Career ==
=== Early career ===
Hutchence, the Farriss brothers, Kerny, Sanders, Beers and Kennelly briefly performed as the Vegetables, singing "We Are the Vegetables". Ten months later, they returned to Sydney and recorded a set of demos. The Farriss Brothers regularly supported hard rockers Midnight Oil on the pub rock circuit, and were renamed as INXS in 1979. Their first performance under the new name was on 1 September at the Oceanview Hotel in Toukley. In May 1980, the group released their first single, "Simple Simon"/"We Are the Vegetables", which was followed by the debut album INXS in October. Their first Top 40 Australian hit on the Kent Music Report Singles Chart, "Just Keep Walking", was released in September 1980. Hutchence became the main spokesman for the band, and co-wrote almost all of the band's songs with Andrew Farriss.

According to Hutchence, most of the songs on the band's second album, Underneath the Colours, were written within a fairly short space of time: "Most bands shudder at the prospect of having 20 years to write their first album and four days to write their second. For us, though, it was good. It left less room for us to go off on all sorts of tangents." Soon after recording sessions for Underneath the Colours – produced by Richard Clapton – had finished, band members started work on outside projects. Hutchence recorded "Speed Kills", written by Don Walker of hard rockers Cold Chisel, for the soundtrack to the 1982 film Freedom, directed by Scott Hicks. It was Hutchence's first solo single and was released by WEA in April 1982.

=== Stardom and acting career ===
In March 1985, after Hutchence and INXS recorded their album The Swing (1984), WEA released the Australian version of Dekadance as a limited edition cassette only EP of six tracks including remixes from the album. The cassette also included a cover version of Nancy Sinatra and Lee Hazlewood's hit "Jackson", which Hutchence sang as a duet with Jenny Morris, a backing singer for The Swing sessions. The EP reached No 2 on the Kent Music Report Albums Chart. Hutchence provided vocals for new wave band Beargarden's 1985 single release.

On 19 May 1984, INXS won seven awards at the Countdown Music and Video Awards ceremony, including Best Songwriter for Hutchence and Andrew, and Most Popular Male for Hutchence. They performed "Burn for You" dressed in Akubras (a brand of hats) and Drizabones (a brand of outdoor coats/oilskin jackets) followed by Hutchence and Morris singing "Jackson" to close.

In 1986, Hutchence played Sam, the male lead in the Australian film Dogs in Space, directed by Richard Lowenstein, who also directed several music videos for INXS. Hutchence provided four original songs to the film's soundtrack. Also working on the film and its soundtrack, as music director, was Ollie Olsen (ex-Whirlywirld).

Late in 1986, before commencing work on a new INXS album and while supposedly taking an eight-month break, the band's management decided to stage the Australian Made tour as a series of major outdoor concerts across the country. The roster featured INXS, Jimmy Barnes (Cold Chisel), Models, Divinyls, Mental as Anything, the Triffids and I'm Talking. To promote the tour, Hutchence and Barnes shared vocals on the Easybeats cover "Good Times" and "Laying Down the Law", which Barnes co-wrote with Beers, Andrew Farriss, Jon Farriss, Hutchence and Pengilly. "Good Times" was used as the theme for the concert series of 1986–1987. It peaked at No. 2 on the Australian charts, and months later was featured in the Joel Schumacher film The Lost Boys and its soundtrack, allowing it to peak at No. 47 in the US on 1 August 1987. Divinyls' lead singer Chrissy Amphlett enjoyed the tour and reconnected with Hutchence, stating that "[he] was a sweet man, who said in one interview that he wanted me to have his baby". In 1987, Hutchence provided vocals for Richard Clapton's album Glory Road, which was produced by Jon Farriss.

INXS released Kick in October 1987, and the album provided the band with worldwide popularity. Kick peaked at No. 1 in Australia, No. 3 on the US Billboard 200, No. 9 in UK, and No. 15 in Austria. The band's most successful studio album, Kick has been certified six times platinum by the RIAA and spawned four US top 10 singles ("New Sensation", "Never Tear Us Apart", "Devil Inside" and "Need You Tonight", the last reaching the top of the US Billboard singles charts). According to 1001 Songs: The Great Songs of All Time and the Artists, Stories and Secrets Behind Them, the single "Need You Tonight" is not lyrically complex; it is Hutchence's performance where "he sings in kittenish whisper, gently drawing back with the incredible lust of a tiger hunting in the night" that makes the song "as sexy and funky as any white rock group has ever been". In September 1988, the band swept the MTV Video Music Awards with the video for "Need You Tonight/Mediate" winning in five categories.

In 1989, Hutchence collaborated further with Olsen for the Max Q project and was joined by members of Olsen's previous groups including Whirlywirld, No and Orchestra of Skin and Bone. They released a self-titled album and three singles, "Way of the World", "Sometimes" and "Monday Night by Satellite". Max Q disbanded in 1990. Max Q showed Hutchence exploring the darker side of his music and, with Olsen, he created "one of the most innovative dance music albums of the decade". Hutchence wrote most of the music and provided "an extraordinary performance ... it was one of the most significant statements Hutchence was to make". In 1990, Hutchence portrayed nineteenth-century Romantic poet Percy Shelley in Roger Corman's film version of Frankenstein Unbound, which was based on a science fiction time travel story of the same name written by Brian Aldiss.

In 1990, INXS released X, which spawned more international hits such as "Suicide Blonde" and "Disappear" (both Top 10 in the US). "Suicide Blonde" peaked at No. 2 in Australia and No. 11 in the UK. Hutchence, with Andrew Farriss, wrote the song after Hutchence's then-girlfriend, Kylie Minogue, used the phrase "suicide blonde" to describe her look during her 1989 film The Delinquents; the film depicted Minogue in a platinum blonde wig. Hutchence won Best International Artist at the 1991 BRIT Awards with INXS winning the related group award. Hutchence provided vocals for pub rockers Noiseworks' album Love Versus Money (1991). Welcome to Wherever You Are was released by INXS in August 1992. It received good critical reviews and went to No. 1 in the UK.

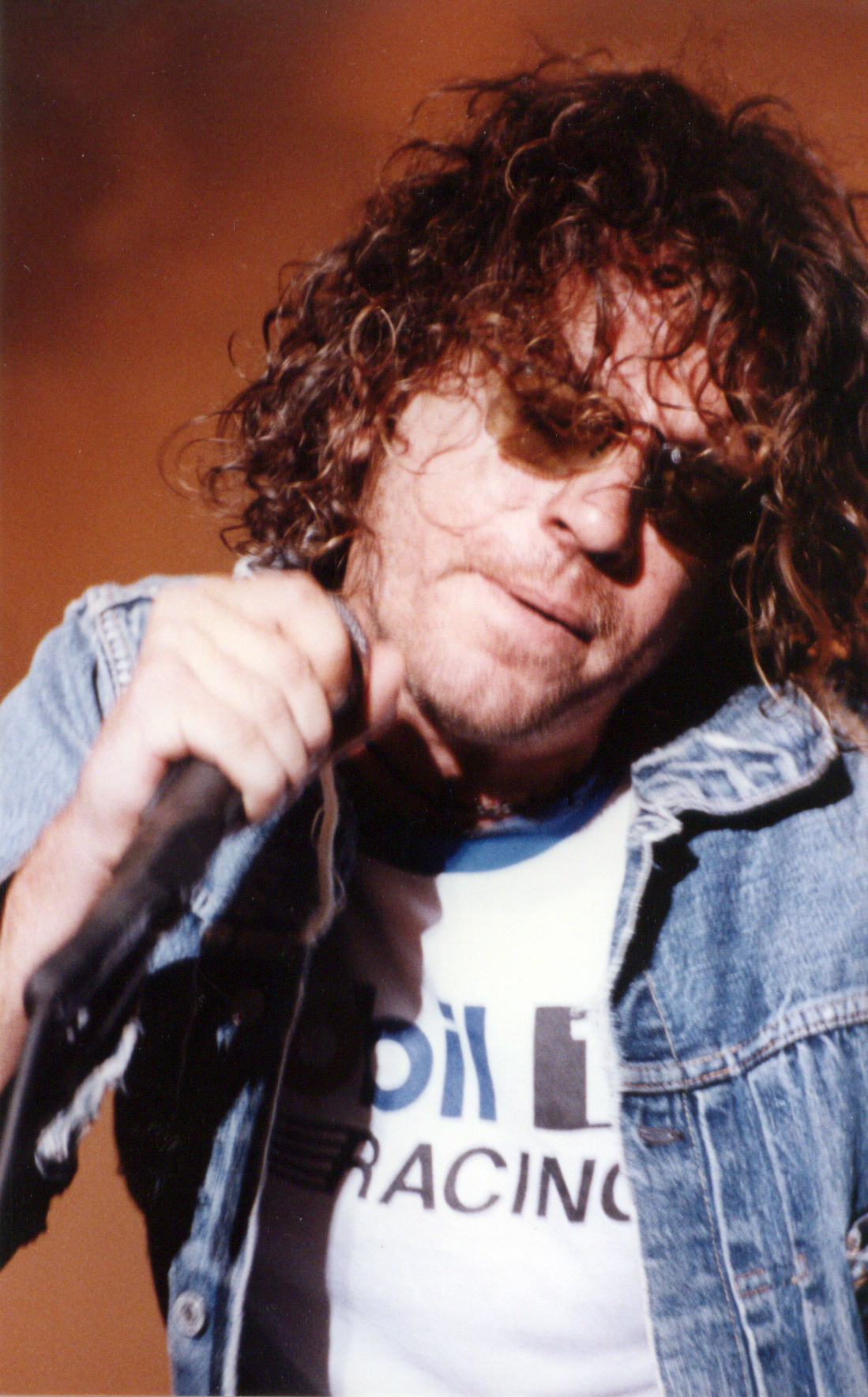
January 1994, on stage during the Dirty Honeymoon world tour

=== Later career ===
Hutchence and INXS faced reduced commercial success with Full Moon, Dirty Hearts, especially in the US. The band took time off to rest and be with their families, while Hutchence remained in the public eye through his romances. He commenced work on a self-titled solo album in the mid-1990s. INXS recorded the band's 10th official album, Elegantly Wasted, in 1997.

=== Artistry ===
Hutchence was a baritone. His vocal range spanned from the bass B1 to the high tenor F#5. In 2013, News.com.au ranked Hutchence fourth in a list of the 15 greatest Australian singers of all time. Billboard described Hutchence as "charismatic" with a "seductive purr and [a] lithe, magnetic stage presence". Paul Donoughue, of Australia's ABC, wrote that Hutchence had "a phenomenal voice — moody, sexual, and dynamic, able to shift effortlessly from fragile to cocksure". Reviewing an INXS concert, Dave Simpson of The Guardian wrote that "Watching Hutchence, hair flailing, crotch thrusting, a mischievous smile forever creeping across his leathery face, I realised that here was a man born to be onstage, living and loving every minute, an explosion of sexual energy." Hutchence biographer Toby Creswell asserted that "Hutchence was, without question, one of the truly great frontmen — he expressed the music in a dynamic way that few others could."

== Personal life ==
According to People, Hutchence's "public brawls and onetime open drug use" led London tabloids to dub him the "wild man of rock". Between 1982 and 1987, he dated Australian film producer Michele Bennett, with whom he shared a flat in Paddington along with New Zealand-Australian singer Jenny Morris, who was INXS's backing vocalist. Bennett inspired INXS's 1988 hit song "Never Tear Us Apart", and introduced Hutchence to Australian filmmaker Richard Lowenstein, who ended up directing several music videos for INXS, including the one for "Never Tear Us Apart". According to Hutchence's sister, Tina, Bennett was the only woman that Hutchence said he had considered marrying.

Lowenstein, who was close friends with Hutchence, also said that he believed Bennett was the only woman Hutchence would marry; "I always felt that, after everything, he'd go back and marry Michele and have a baby with her," he told The Independent in 1998. Bennett and Hutchence remained close friends after the end of their relationship and she was described as Hutchence's "first real love", his "closest friend and confidante".

He was romantically linked to Australian singer and actress Kylie Minogue between 1989 and 1991, American singer Belinda Carlisle, British actress and model Patsy Kensit, Danish model Helena Christensen between 1991 and 1995, and Australian actress Kym Wilson.

In August 1992, Hutchence and Christensen were riding their bicycles at night in Copenhagen. They were eating pizza in a narrow street when a taxi tried to get through, but "didn't beep its horn or anything". The taxi driver then exited his vehicle and assaulted Hutchence, causing him to fall backwards and hit his head on the pavement; he suffered a fractured skull. According to Christensen when Hutchence regained consciousness at the hospital and was aggressive; the doctors believed he was drunk and let him check himself out of the hospital. He spent the next month in Christensen's apartment with serious medical problems such as talking nonsense, vomiting regularly, and not eating or sleeping normally. After a month he agreed to see her family doctor who sent him to Paris for a brain scan. He was left with brain damage and completely lost his sense of smell, as well as losing a significant amount of his sense of taste. The injury led to periods of depression and increased levels of aggression. According to INXS bandmate Beers, Hutchence brandished a knife and threatened to kill him during the 1993 recording of Full Moon, Dirty Hearts. Beers recalled, "Over those six weeks, Michael threatened or physically confronted nearly every member of the band."

In the mid-1990s, Hutchence became romantically involved with British television presenter Paula Yates. They met in 1985, during an interview for the British TV program The Tube. Yates interviewed him again in 1994 for her Big Breakfast show, and their affair was soon uncovered by the British press. At the time, Yates was married to the Boomtown Rats singer and Live Aid organiser Bob Geldof. Media scrutiny was intense, and Hutchence assaulted a photographer who had followed them. Yates's separation from Geldof in February 1995 sparked a public and at times bitter custody battle over their daughters. Yates and Geldof divorced in May 1996.

On 22 July 1996, Yates gave birth to her daughter with Hutchence, Heavenly Hiraani Tiger Lily Hutchence, who was born in the bathroom of their London home while Hutchence helped with the delivery. In September 1996, Yates and Hutchence made headlines when they were arrested on suspicion of drug possession after the family nanny reportedly found a small amount of opium in a shoebox underneath their bed. The case was dropped due to lack of evidence. Yates died on 17 September 2000 of an accidental heroin overdose; she was discovered in the presence of her and Hutchence's then four-year-old daughter. Soon after Yates's death, Geldof assumed foster custody of their daughter so that she could be brought up with her three older half-sisters, Fifi, Peaches and Pixie. In 2007, their daughter was adopted by Geldof, who legally changed her surname, despite opposition from Hutchence's mother and sister. Her full legal name became Heavenly Hiraani Tiger Lily Hutchence-Geldof.

Hutchence met singer Nick Cave in 1984. He had been a fan of Cave's group The Birthday Party and observed the earliest versions of the group that developed into Nick Cave and the Bad Seeds. Though initially casually acquainted, the friendship between Hutchence and Cave grew much closer by the early 1990s when they both lived in London and briefly co-owned a small bistro.

== Death ==
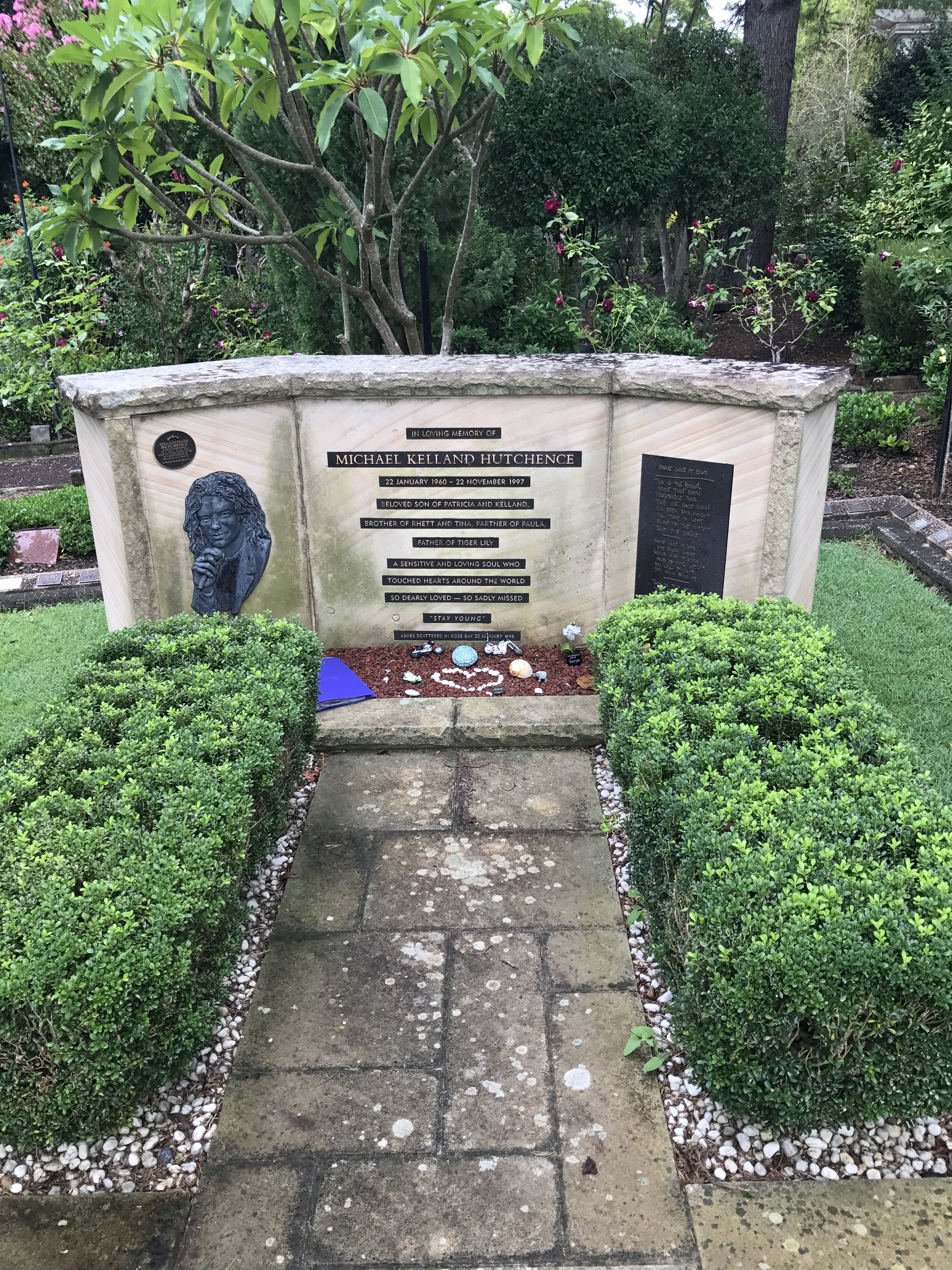
Hutchence memorial at Northern Suburbs Crematorium, North Ryde, New South Wales. Inscription reads: "In loving memory of Michael Kelland Hutchence, 22 January 1960 - 22 November 1997. Beloved son of Patricia and Kelland, brother of Rhett and Tina, partner of Paula, father of Tiger Lily. A sensitive and loving soul who touched hearts around the world. So dearly loved - so sadly missed. 'Stay young'. Ashes Scattered in Rose Bay 22 January 1998."

On 22 November 1997, at the age of 37, Hutchence was found dead in his room at the Ritz-Carlton hotel in the Double Bay suburb of Sydney. His cause of death was recorded as suicide by hanging. Earlier that year, Hutchence had started a world tour with INXS to support the April 1997 release of their tenth studio album Elegantly Wasted. The band's final 20th anniversary tour was to occur in Australia in November and December 1997. The first concert of the tour was scheduled for 23 November in Sydney, where the band rehearsed on 21 November.

During the tour, Paula Yates planned to visit Hutchence in Sydney for Christmas and stay for three months with their daughter and two of Yates's three other children, Peaches and Pixie, but her ongoing custody battle with ex-husband Bob Geldof prevented the visit from happening. Geldof and Yates each gave police statements concerning the phone calls they exchanged with Hutchence on the morning of his death, but did not volunteer their phone records. Yates's statement on 26 November indicated that she had informed Hutchence of the Geldof girls' custody hearing being adjourned until 17 December, which meant that Yates would not be able to bring their daughter and the Geldof girls to Australia for a visit as previously intended. According to Yates, Hutchence "was frightened and couldn't stand a minute more without his baby ... [he] was terribly upset and he said 'I don't know how I'll live without seeing Tiger'." She indicated that Hutchence said he was going to call Geldof "to let the girls come to Australia". Geldof's police statements and evidence to the coroner indicated he did receive a call from Hutchence, who was "hectoring and abusive and threatening" during their phone conversation. The occupant in the room next to Hutchence's heard a loud male voice and swearing at about 5:00 am; the coroner was satisfied that this was Hutchence arguing with Geldof.

Actress Kym Wilson and her then-boyfriend, Andrew Rayment, who visited Hutchence in his hotel room on the evening of 21 November, were the last people to see him alive; they arrived some time after 11:00 pm and left around 5:00 am. Wilson stated that she, Rayment and Hutchence had between six and eight drinks but were hardly drunk, and that Hutchence talked passionately about his relationship with Yates and their daughter and was anxious about the custody case between Yates and Geldof. Wilson said that Hutchence believed it was right that he and Yates get custody of the children, and that he was proud that Yates and Geldof's daughters called him "daddy". Wilson denied that there were drugs in the room while she was there and also denied that they had sex.

At 9:38 am on 22 November, Hutchence left a voicemail to his manager, Martha Troup, in which he said: "Martha, Michael here, I f---ing had enough." Troup rang his hotel room immediately but there was no answer. Hutchence called Troup again at 9:50 am and left a message on her answering machine; it was reported that he "sounded as if he was affected by something and was slow and deep." Worried by the call, Troup spoke to INXS tour manager, John Martin, who said that he had received a note from Hutchence stating that he was "not going to rehearsals today". At 9:54 am, Hutchence spoke with a former girlfriend, Michele Bennett, who was the last person that he called on the morning of his death. According to Bennett, Hutchence was crying, sounded upset, said he could not sleep and told her he needed to see her. Bennett arrived at his hotel room door at about 10:40 am, but there was no response, so she thought he had fallen asleep and wrote him a note and left it at reception. Hutchence's body was discovered naked behind the door to his room by a hotel maid at 11:50 am. Police reported that Hutchence had used a leather belt tied to the automatic door closer at the top of the door.

Following Hutchence's death, some of his friends, relatives and doctors provided statements to the police. Bennett, who made her phone records available to the detectives without them requesting it, said on her police statement that Hutchence had never expressed previous suicidal inclinations. Hutchence's mother, Patricia Glassop, said that he had been in a depressed state. On 17 October 1997, Hutchence consulted a London psychiatrist, Mark Collins, in regard to a minor depression that he was experiencing. Collins stated that there was no hint of suicidal thinking by Hutchence. Hutchence was prescribed Prozac for the first time in December 1995 by J. Borham, a London medical practitioner, to treat depression. He was prescribed Prozac for the last time on 1 November 1997, three weeks before his death.

On 6 February 1998, after an autopsy and coronial inquest, New South Wales's state coroner, Derrick Hand, presented his report. The report ruled that Hutchence's death was suicide while depressed and under the influence of alcohol and other drugs. "An analysis report of Hutchence's blood [indicated] the presence of alcohol, cocaine, Prozac and prescription drugs." In producing his coroner's report, Hand had specifically considered the suggestions of accidental death (coupled with the fact that Hutchence left no suicide note), but had discounted them based on substantial evidence presented to the contrary. In a 1999 interview on 60 Minutes and in the Channel 4 documentary film In Excess: The Death of Michael Hutchence, Yates claimed that Hutchence's death might have resulted from autoerotic asphyxiation; this claim contradicted her previous statements to police investigators and the coroner. Police dismissed Yates's version of Hutchence's death. Yates initially blamed Geldof for Hutchence's death, stating that the custody battle and their last phone call had driven Hutchence to despair.

While conducting research for his 2019 documentary Mystify: Michael Hutchence, director Richard Lowenstein found six or seven interviews where Hutchence had mentioned suicide, stating things such as: "no one minds if you kill yourself". Lowenstein also found stick figures that Hutchence had drawn of himself with a noose around his neck in his diaries from the 1980s. Lowenstein had access to Hutchence's full autopsy report and said there was no evidence of autoerotic asphyxiation in it. Hutchence's body being found naked also contributed to the myth created by Yates and spread by British tabloids that his death was the result from autoerotic asphyxiation. But his sister Tina said in her 2000 book Just a Man: The Real Michael Hutchence that he had the habit of sleeping naked since his teens. Lowenstein stated in a 2019 interview that Hutchence would often lounge naked in his hotel room, even when Lowenstein visited him. "Unfortunately, Michael dying from autoerotic asphyxiation was a rumour spread after he died for certain people wanting to hide that he wasn't depressed, that he was more than happy. The press went berserk, but there was absolutely no evidence. [...] It just didn't add up. He's ringing his longtime girlfriend, Michele (Bennett), 20 minutes before (his death). You don't ring someone crying, [bawling] your eyes out and then go off and have some autoeroticism 20 minutes later when she's banging on the door and you're not alive anymore. I don't think that's possible", he said. Lowenstein also asked all of Hutchence's girlfriends if he liked being strangled or tied up, but all of them said "no".

=== Funeral and memorial ===
On 27 November 1997, Hutchence's funeral was held at St Andrew's Cathedral in Sydney and was attended by 600 people, including his family, bandmates, Paula Yates and their daughter, Hutchence's favourite singer, Tom Jones, and former girlfriends Kylie Minogue and Helena Christensen. The funeral was broadcast live on Australian television. His casket was carried out of the cathedral by members of INXS and his younger brother, Rhett; "Never Tear Us Apart" was played in the background. Nick Cave, a friend of Hutchence, performed his 1997 song "Into My Arms" during the funeral and requested that television cameras be switched off. At one point, an individual had to be escorted out due to attempting to commit suicide from the balcony. Hutchence's parents asked that in lieu of flowers, donations should be sent to UNICEF and the Starlight Foundation. Rhett claimed in his 2004 book, Total XS, that on the previous day at the funeral home, Yates had told him she put a gram of heroin into Michael's pocket.

Hutchence was cremated and his ashes were divided into thirds between his parents, his siblings, and Yates and their daughter, following a battle between his family and Yates that started over Hutchence's wish to be cremated. The portion that went to his mother was buried at Forest Lawn Memorial Park in Hollywood Hills, California. The portion that went to his father was scattered into Sydney Harbour, in Rose Bay, on what would have been Hutchence's 38th birthday on 22 January 1998, and a tombstone was placed at Northern Suburbs Memorial Gardens in North Ryde, Sydney. Yates kept her portion of Hutchence's ashes in a cushion she slept with.

== Legacy ==
After Hutchence's death, INXS continued recording and performing until 2012. According to the Recording Industry Association of America (RIAA), INXS have sold 15 million units in the United States alone. As of 2018, INXS have sold over 50 million records worldwide. INXS were inducted into the ARIA Hall of Fame in 2001.

Hutchence's solo album, Michael Hutchence, was released in October 1999. He had started on the album in 1995, recording songs in between INXS sessions; he had last worked on it three days before his death. The last song he recorded was "Possibilities". The album includes "Slide Away", a duet with U2's Bono; Bono's vocals were recorded after Hutchence's death. The 1999 movie Limp includes a cameo by Hutchence.

On 18 June 2000, Hutchence's mother Patricia Glassop and his sister Tina Hutchence released their book Just a Man: The Real Michael Hutchence, which has been described as "an odd biography ... [that] combines the basic facts of Hutchence's early life ... with an almost too-intimate view of the authors' feelings".

On 20 August 2005, Melbourne's The Age reported on the disposition of Hutchence's estate and assets, which, although estimated at between $10 million and $20 million, amounted to virtually nothing. The remainder of his estate had reportedly been sold off or swallowed in legal fees.

A documentary about Hutchence, Michael Hutchence: The Last Rockstar, aired on Australia's Seven Network in 2017. In 2019, Mystify: Michael Hutchence—another documentary about Hutchence's life directed by Richard Lowenstein—was released.

== Discography ==
=== Posthumous albums ===
Title	Details	Peak chart positions		Certifications
Title	Details	AUS	UK	Certifications
Michael Hutchence	Released: 14 December 1999; Label: V2	3	90	ARIA: Gold
Mystify: A Musical Journey with Michael Hutchence	Released: 5 July 2019; Label: Petrol	28	—	

=== Singles ===
Title	Year	Peak chart positions		Album
Title	Year	AUS	UK	Album
"Speed Kills"	1982	—	—	Freedom (soundtrack)
"Rooms for the Memory"	1987	11	—	Dogs in Space (soundtrack)
"A Straight Line"	1999	44	89	Michael Hutchence
"Friction"	2015	—	—	Non-album single
"Spill the Wine"	2019	—	—	Mystify: A Musical Journey with Michael Hutchence

=== Other appearances ===
List of other non-single song appearances
Title	Year	Album
"Forest Theme" (with Don Walker)	1982	Freedom (Original Motion Picture Soundtrack)
"Dogs in Space", "Golf Course" and "The Green Dragon"	1987	Dogs in Space (Original Motion Picture Soundtrack)
"Under My Thumb" (with the London Symphony Orchestra)	1994	Symphonic Music of the Rolling Stones
"Baby Let's Play House" (with NRBQ)	1994	It's Now or Never: The Tribute to Elvis
"The Passenger"	1995	Batman Forever Original Motion Picture Soundtrack
"Spill the Wine"	1996	Barb Wire Original Motion Picture Soundtrack
"Red Hill"	1996	One Voice: The Songs of Chage & Aska
"The King Is Gone" (with the Heads)	1996	No Talking, Just Head

== Tributes and dedications ==
- In 1997, Duran Duran wrote the song "Michael You've Got a Lot to Answer For". The song appeared on their album Medazzaland. Lead singer Simon Le Bon told Q magazine that the song, released shortly before Hutchence's death, was about "Michael being a naughty boy ... when he was living with Paula Yates. He did like his substances."
- Nick Cave sang "Into My Arms" at Hutchence's funeral on 27 November 1997. The funeral was broadcast live on Australian TV. Out of respect, Cave requested the song not be televised.
- Terri Nunn of Berlin and Billy Corgan collaborated on "Sacred and Profane" for Berlin's 2000 album Live: Sacred & Profane. Nunn said, "The song is about my first experience seeing [Hutchence] because that changed my life. He influenced me probably more than anyone else as a performer. I became 12 years old in five minutes wanting to have sex with him. That's all I wanted! Oh my God. Everybody did! You just wanted him. He was the epitome of [a] rock star."
- Bono, a close friend of Hutchence, wrote "Stuck in a Moment You Can't Get Out Of" on the 2000 U2 album All That You Can't Leave Behind. The song is written in the form of an argument about suicide in which he tries to convince Hutchence of its foolishness. Bono characterised the song as a good old row between friends, adding that he felt guilty for never having had it with Hutchence in real life. In a 2005 interview, Bono regretted that he had not spent more time with Hutchence. Bono's wife, Alison Hewson, had seen Hutchence before his death and noted "he looked a bit shaky to [her]".
- INXS's 2006 single "God's Top Ten" (with new singer J.D. Fortune) was written by Andrew Farriss as a tribute to Hutchence and his daughter.
- On 23 November 2019, U2 paid tribute to Hutchence in Sydney, Australia, on their Joshua Tree Tour.

== Awards and nominations ==
=== APRA Awards ===
The APRA Awards are presented annually from 1982 by the Australasian Performing Right Association (APRA), "honouring composers and songwriters". They commenced in 1982.

Year	Nominee / work	Award	Result	Ref.
2021	"Break My Heart" by Dua Lipa (Andrew Farriss, Michael Hutchence, Dua Lipa, Jordan Johnson, Stefan Johnson, Ali Tamposi, Andrew Watt)	Song of the Year	Shortlisted	
2021	"Break My Heart" by Dua Lipa (Andrew Farriss, Michael Hutchence, Dua Lipa, Jordan Johnson, Stefan Johnson, Ali Tamposi, Andrew Watt)	Most Performed Pop Work	Nominated	
2021	"Break My Heart" by Dua Lipa (Andrew Farriss, Michael Hutchence, Dua Lipa, Jordan Johnson, Stefan Johnson, Ali Tamposi, Andrew Watt)	Most Performed Australian Work	Nominated	

=== Australian Songwriters Hall of Fame ===
The Australian Songwriters Hall of Fame was established in 2004 to honour the lifetime achievements of some of Australia's greatest songwriters.

Year	Nominee / work	Award	Result
2016	Himself	Australian Songwriters Hall of Fame	inducted

=== Countdown Australian Music Awards ===
Countdown was an Australian pop music TV series on national broadcaster ABC-TV from 1974 to 1987, it presented music awards from 1979 to 1987, initially in conjunction with magazine TV Week. The TV Week / Countdown Awards were a combination of popular-voted and peer-voted awards.

Year	Nominee / work	Award	Result
1984	Himself (with Andrew Farriss)	Best Songwriter	Won
1984	Himself	Most Popular Male Performer	Won
1984	Himself ("Burn for You" by INXS)	Best Male Performance in a Video	Nominated
1986	Himself	Most Popular Male Performer	Nominated
