= Craig Melville =

Australian television comedy director

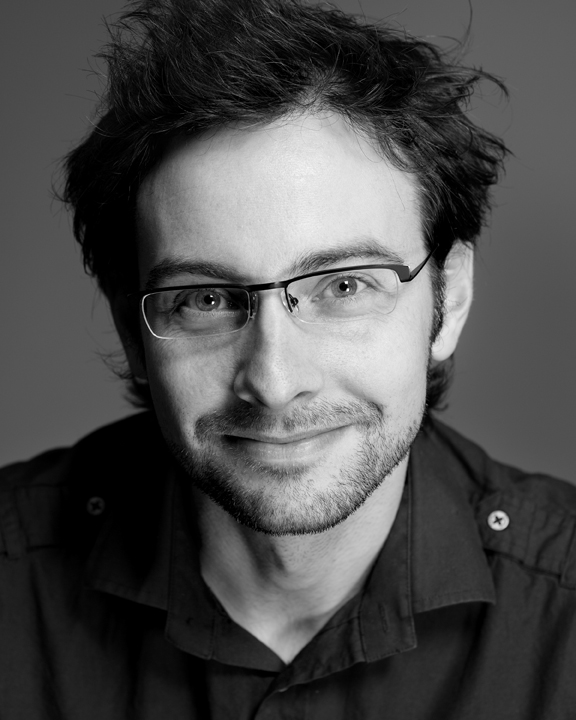
- Born: Craig James Melville; Melbourne, Australia
- Occupations: Director; Producer
- Known for: Maximum Choppage; John Safran vs God; The Chaser's War on Everything; John Safran's Race Relations; Lawrence Leung's Choose Your Own Adventure; Lawrence Leung's Unbelievable

Craig James Melville is an Australian television comedy director. He is best known for his collaborations with comedians John Safran, Lawrence Leung and The Chaser.

== Filmography ==
=== Television ===
- Maximum Choppage Series Director (2015)
- The Elegant Gentleman's Guide to Knife Fighting – Director (2013)
- Lawrence Leung's Unbelievable Director / Producer (2011)
- John Safran's Race Relations Director / Producer (2009)
- The Chaser's War on Everything: Series 1, 2 & 3 – Director / Producer (2006–2009)
- Lawrence Leung's Choose Your Own Adventure – Director / Producer (2008)
- The Chaser Decides: Series 2 – Director /Producer (2007)
- Speaking in Tongues – Director / Producer (2005–2006)
- John Safran vs God Director (2004–2005)
- John Safran's Music Jamboree Segment Director (2002)
- The Late Report John Safran Segment Director (1999)
- John Safran: Media Tycoon Director (1998)
- John Safran: Master Chef Director (1998)

=== Music clips ===
- Brother Mouth - "Neck Pillow" 2025
- Brother Mouth - "Douche Canoe" 2023
- The Bedroom Philosopher – "Northcote (So Hungover)" (2010)
- TISM – "Thunderbirds Are Coming Out" (1998) TISM_Thunderbirds
- TISM – "Whatareya?" (1998)
- Magic Dirt – "She-Riff" (1999) MagicDirt
- Frenzal Rhomb – 'We're Going Out Tonight" (2000)
- Frank Bennett – "Opportunities", "Let's Make Lots of Money" (1999)
- Josh Abrahams – "Addicted to Bass" (1998)
- John Safran – "Not the Sunscreen Song" (1997)

=== Short film ===
- Dead Island 2: Another Day in HELL.A. The Polygamist (2013)
- Smithston (2013)
- Dentally Disturbed (co-director) (2004)
- Brief Fiction (1996)

== Awards ==
=== Television Awards ===
Maximum Choppage (ABC)

- Australian Directors' Guild - Best Comedy - Nomination

John Safran's Race Relations (ABC)

- Australian Directors' Guild – Best Comedy – Nomination
- Australian Directors' Guild – Best Reality / Light Entertainment – Nomination
- Rose D'or 2010 – Best Comedy – Nomination (Producers: John Safran & Laura Waters)
- Rose D'or 2010 – Social Award – Nomination (Producers: John Safran & Laura Waters)

Lawrence Leung's Unbelievable (ABC)

- Australian Directors' Guild Awards – Best Television Comedy – Nomination 2009

Lawrence Leung's Choose Your Own Adventure (ABC)

- AFI Awards – Nomination – Best Television Comedy 2009
- Australian Directors' Guild Awards – Best Achievement in Television Comedy – Nomination

The Chaser's War on Everything (ABC)

- AFI Award 2006 – Best Television Comedy – Winner (Producers: Mark FitzGerald, Julian Morrow, Andy Nehl)
- AFI Award 2007 – Best Television Comedy – Nomination (Producers: Andy Nehl, Julian Morrow, Jo Wathen)
- Logie Award 2008 – Most Outstanding Comedy Program – Nomination

John Safran vs God

- AFI Award – Winner – Best Television Comedy (Producers: John Safran and Selin Yaman)
- Logie Awards – Nomination – Most Outstanding Comedy Program

John Safran's Music Jamboree director – various segments

- AFI Award – Winner – Best Comedy Series – 2003 (Producers: Selin Yaman & John Safran)
- Logie Awards – Nomination – Most Outstanding Comedy Program – 2003

=== Music Video Awards ===
Year	Song	Artist	Awards & Nominations	Ref
2010	Northcote (So Hungover)	The Bedroom Philosopher	American International Film Festival – Best Music Video American International Film Festival – Best Director Music Video; Australian Cinematographers Society – Best Cinematography in a Music Video (Silver); Australian Directors' Guild Awards – Best Music Video; Canada International Film Festival – Award of Excellence; Channel V – Ripe Clip of the Week; Colorado Film Festival – Best Music Video; Houston Comedy Film Festival – Best Cinematography in a Music Video; Los Angeles Cinema Festival of Hollywood – Best Music Video; Los Angeles Movie Awards – Award of Excellence; Metropolitan Film Festival of New York – Honourable Mention; Mountain Film Festival California – Best Music Video; Royal Flush Film Festival – Best Music Video; Rage – Indy Clip of the Week; St Kilda Film Festival – Best Independent Music Video; Urban Mediamakers Film Festival – Best Music Video – Runner Up; 15 Minutes of Fame Film Festival – Best Music Video	
1998	Thunderbirds Are Coming Out	TISM	Australian Cinematographers Society Award – Best Cinematography in a Music Video – Honourable Mention	
1998	Addicted to Bass	Josh Abrahams	Nominated ARIA Music Awards Nominated for Best Music Video	

=== Short Film Awards ===
The Polygamist

- Iron Mule Comedy Festival New York – Judges Favourite Award

Dentally Disturbed (co-director) (2004) SF_Dentally_Disturbed

- Flickerfest 2005 – Sydney – Winner of SBS Television Award
- Portland International Film Festival (USA) – Audience Choice Award 2005
- Down Under Film Festival 'Best Australian Short Comedy' 2005
- Sony Tropfest 'Best of the Rest' competition winner
- London Rushes Soho Short Film Festival – Best Newcomer – Runner up
- Angry Film Festival – Runner-up

Brief Fiction (1996)

- Gold – Australian Cinematographers Society Awards 1996

Love Hurts

- Silver – Australian Cinematographers Society Awards – Fictional Drama Shorts – Cinema and TV 1999
