= Dentally Disturbed =

- Directed by: Craig Melville; Cameron Mitchell
- Written by: Cameron Mitchell
- Produced by: Jodie Crawford-Fish; David Curry; Craig Melville
- Starring: Ben Anderson; Damian Callinan; Kate Gorman; John Safran
- Cinematography: Germain McMicking
- Edited by: Craig Melville; Cameron Mitchell
- Distributed by: Money Shot
- Release date: 31 January 2004
- Running time: 6 minutes
- Country: Australia
- Language: English

Dentally Disturbed is an Australian short film written by Cameron Mitchell and directed by Craig Melville and Cameron Mitchell. It first aired on SBS in Australia on 24 December 2004.

== Plot ==
The film begins with Ed (Ben Anderson) shopping in the supermarket with his wife, Gina (Kate Gorman). Ed searches the shelves for dental floss, but can't find any. Both Gina and a supermarket employee seem to have never heard of it before: "You mean, toothpicks?" Ed asks his friends, his dentist, Google, and even the local radio station, all of them confused as to the origin of the product and as to why toothpicks would not suffice. Finally, Ed proposes the idea of dental floss to Oral-B. The CEO rejects it, saying "The wheel's already been invented, mate!" The CEO too, has never heard of it. In desperation, Ed purchases some candles, which he begins to strip down in order to use the wax-covered string inside as dental floss. Gina, sensing his maddening fight with this problem, convinces Ed to move on. As she does this, however, she is searching frantically through her bag to find her tampons. Confused, Ed asks, "What the hell are tampons?"

== Cast ==
The film features only four main actors, who have all featured in their own television shows.

- Ben Anderson as Ed
- Damian Callinan as Market Employee
- Kate Gorman as Gina
- John Safran as Radio DJ

Ben Anderson and Damian Callinan are both regular characters on the Australian comedy skitHOUSE. John Safran, who portrays himself, featured on John Safran vs God, and Kate Gorman acted in You and Your Stupid Mate.

== Critical acclaim ==
The National Flossing Council: "Dentally Disturbed" is "a funny, thought provoking story"

== Festivals and awards ==
- 2005 Flickerfest International Short Film Festival. Winner, "SBS Eastcarpet Award"
- 2005 Portland International Short Film Festival. Winner, "Audience choice award"
- 2005 Down Under Film Festival. Winner, "Best Australian Short Comedy"
- 2005 Sony Tropfest. Winner, "Best of the Rest competition"
- 2005 London Rushes Soho Short Film Festival. Runner-up for "Best Newcomer".
- Qantas In-flight Entertainment programme, Licensing deal
- Angry Film Festival, Runner Up
