= The Dukes of Broxstonia season 1 =

The Dukes of Broxstonia
- Season 1
- No. of episodes: 10

Release
- Original network: ABC3
- Original release: 2 August 2010 – 2 January 2011

Season chronology
- Next → Season 2

The first season of animated series "The Dukes Of Broxstonia" first broadcast on ABC3 Australia on 2 August 2010 and ended on 2 January 2011. It contains 10 episodes available as 40 seconds episodes, in 480 SD format. The season began with "Ear Ache" and ended with "On TV".

== Episode list ==
The Dukes of Broxstonia season 1 episodes
No. overall	No. in season	Title	Original release date	Prod. code
1	1	"Ear Ache"	2 August 2010	101
The Dukes are tuning up in their studio when Barj scratches his ear with his drumstick. A deluge of wax pours out. The wax forms into a clone of Barj. Barj is in love. Arj and Larj look on in amazement as Barj dances with his waxy clone. Larj decides to do something about it and melts the wax clone with a hairdryer.
2	2	"Itchier & Scratchier"	3 August 2010	102
The Dukes are playing at a concert. Larj has an itchy head. He removes his cap to reveal a lice dancing on his scalp to their music. The lice bites Larj. Arj sprays Larj with a can - we see its 'extra extra volume' hairspray. Larj's lice grows into a massive monster who attacks the Dukes. They defend themselves - but then realise the lice only wants to play. Barj hands him a tambourine and, still freaked out, the Dukes play on with the lice.
3	3	"Fan Belt"	4 August 2010	103
The Dukes are backstage in their trailer after their concert. They can hear a baying crowd. When Arj looks outside he sees weird ugly alien girl fans. They scream for Arj and he retreats into the trailer. When Barj opens the door, the girls bellow for him too. Larj gives it a go and finds the girls uninterested. So Arj and Barj open up Larj and step inside him. They make their escape inside Larj.
4	4	"Pants Orf"	5 August 2010	104
The Dukes leap out from their tour bus expecting some serious fanage - but instead find all the girls distracted by a superhero in costume. The Dukes make fun of the superhero - who then dispatches the Dukes to show them who's boss. All the Dukes end up wedgied with their pants pulled up high over their heads. They waddle off grumbling.
5	5	"Pizza Fight"	6 August 2010	105
The Dukes are having a pizza backstage when Arj and Larj fight over the last slice. Arj and Barj's tug of war over the pizza continues through to their concert. They try everything to win but when they knock over the staging and end up underneath a huge backdrop, it's Larj who ends up getting the last bite.
6	6	"Pot Luck"	9 August 2010	106
The Dukes are driving in their van when they spot a "Welcome Dukes" sign. Little do they know it's a reception for some royal Dukes, not them! The Dukes crash the party, driving their van into the dining area. But when Larj takes it too far and throws a cake at the party host, the fed up royals chase them outside.
7	7	"Desert Duel"	10 August 2010	107
The Dukes are driving across the desert when they run into their boy band rivals, the Lukes of Flokstonia. The Dukes and Lukes transform their vans into dragsters and race across the desert. The Dukes crash into stadium fencing and end up on stage, taking over the Lukes' gig and winning the race.
8	8	"Moon Tour"	11 August 2010	108
The Dukes are abducted by aliens and taken by their egg-shaped spaceship to their odd planet. The Dukes leap into action and play for their freaky hosts, but neither Barj's drumming nor Arj's singing goes down well. When Larj's guitar solo has the aliens cheering, he decides to stage dive, squashing the eggy-aliens in the process.
9	9	"Wash Day"	29 November 2010	109
The Dukes stink - literally. It's time to visit the laundromat. In goes Barj's underpants, Arj's Mohawk hair and Larj. But when Larj exits, he's been transformed into a violin-playing suit wearing classical musician! The girls love him but the Dukes don't. Arj notices the machine is set to "Delicate" so they put Larj back in and change the cycle to "Heavy." Larj returns to his normal stinking self!
10	10	"On TV"	2 January 2011	110
Barj's yelling wakes Arj and Larj up. He holds a TV up in the air. The Dukes are on TV! On the television, we see the Dukes latest film clip and endure their crazy new song. At the end of the clip the Broxstonian national anthem plays as the Broxstonian flag (a bear wearing armour) is hoisted. Arj and Larj salute as Barj's pajama pants fall down.
