= The Dukes of Broxstonia season 3 =

The Dukes of Broxstonia
- Season 3
- No. of episodes: 10

Release
- Original network: ABC3
- Original release: 15 April – 26 April 2013

Season chronology
- ← Previous; Season 2

The third and last season of animated series "The Dukes Of Broxstonia" first broadcast on ABC3 Australia on 15 April 2013 and ended on 26 April 2013. It contains 10 episodes of 7 minutes which include two 3 minute episodes, Broxstonian advertisements for products like stinky breath mints and extra-strong hair gel and other shorts. The third series is also available as 3 minute episodes only. The "Mojo" episode was selected for the Annecy Animation Festival 2013, in 1080i HD format. The season began with "Fly" and ended with "Dukes in Space".

The Dukes of Bröxstônia received the Children's Television Production of the Year Award at the 2013 Screen Producers Australia Awards.

== Episode list ==
The Dukes of Broxstonia season 3 episodes
| No. overall | No. in season | Title | Original release date | Prod. code |
|---|---|---|---|---|
| 21 | 1 | "Fly" | 15 April 2013 | 301 |
Arj battles with a fly inside the van.
| 22 | 2 | "Arj-o-phone" | 16 April 2013 | 302 |
Arj swallows a microphone stand and becomes a coveted piece of musical equipment.
| 23 | 3 | "Undies" | 17 April 2013 | 303 |
Larj's underpants get so grotty, they become alive and split up the band.
| 24 | 4 | "Game" | 18 April 2013 | 304 |
Barj gets stuck inside an 80's pixelated video game.
| 25 | 5 | "Skinny" | 19 April 2013 | 305 |
The Lukes send a cyborg version of Barj's mum on tour with the Dukes to fatten them up.
| 26 | 6 | "Robobarj" | 22 April 2013 | 306 |
After an accident, Barj's body is rebuilt with robotic elements turning him into a super cyborg sleuth!
| 27 | 7 | "Mojo" | 23 April 2013 | 307 |
Larj loses his mojo and turns to the Broxstonian rock god for help.
| 28 | 8 | "Wanted" | 24 April 2013 | 308 |
Larj draws a moustache on Barj and he's mistaken for a wild west villain.
| 29 | 9 | "Royal Dukes" | 25 April 2013 | 309 |
The Dukes catch a ride in a limo and end up at a royal party.
| 30 | 10 | "Dukes In Space" | 26 April 2013 | 310 |
The Dukes head into space! Note − Series finale
