= Northcote (So Hungover) =

Single by The Bedroom Philosopher

from the album Songs from the 86 Tram
- Released: February 2010
- Recorded: October 2009
- Genre: indie rock, comedy rock,
- Length: 3:45
- Label: Shock Records
- Songwriter: Justin Heazlewood
- Producer: Chris Scallan

The Bedroom Philosopher singles chronology
"Wow Wow's Song" (2009)	"Northcote (So Hungover)" (2010)

"Northcote (So Hungover)" is a song by Australian musical comedian The Bedroom Philosopher released in February 2010 and is taken from the ARIA-nominated album Songs from the 86 Tram. It was a notable radio hit on national broadcaster Triple J and its film clip, directed by Craig Melville and produced by David Curry, received over 500,000 views on YouTube.

The song featured in the following year's Triple J Hottest 100 and charted at 12 on the Australian independent charts.

== Personnel ==
- Justin Heazlewood – vocals and acoustic guitar
- Andy Hazel – bass and backing vocals
- Gordon Blake – electric guitar and backing vocals
- Hugh Rabinovici – drums

== Awards ==
- Australian Directors Guild Award - Best Music Video
- Australian Cinematographers Society Award - Best Cinematography in a Music Video - Silver
- California International Film Festival - Best Music Video
- St Kilda Film Festival - Best Independent Music Video
- Best Music Video Award at the 2010 Royal Flush Festival
