= Funemployed (book) =

Book and album by Justin Heazlewood

- Funemployed: Life as an Artist in Australia
- Author: Justin Heazlewood
- Language: English
- Genre: Cultural studies
- Published: 1 June 2014 (Affirm Press)
- Publication place: Australia
- Pages: 214
- ISBN: 9781922213228

Funemployed is the name of both a book by Australian author, performer and musician Justin Heazlewood and an album by his alter-ego The Bedroom Philosopher. It was serialised on ABC Radio National, and also made available as a podcast

== Summary ==
Described by its author as 'Part confessional and part rogue self-help book' , Funemployed details financial, psychological and logistical challenges facing creative individuals in Australia. Drawing on Heazlewood's own experiences, the book features interviews with Tony Martin, Gotye, John Safran, Clare Bowditch, Amanda Palmer and many others.

Funemployed was launched with a complete live reading at Melbourne venue The Howler.

== Album ==
Heazlewood released an eight-track soundtrack album Funemployed LP to accompany the book. It was initially released under his own name but later changed to The Bedroom Philosopher. It features spoken word pieces from interview subjects Brian Ritchie, Tim Rogers and Sam Simmons. This followed the Funemployed EP which remained released under his own name and was distributed via a download code with the initial run of books.
