= Speaking in Tongues (TV series) =

Australian television program

- Opening Title
- Starring: John Safran; Father Bob Maguire
- Country of origin: Australia
- Original language: English
- No. of seasons: 1
- No. of episodes: 12

Production
- Executive producer: Michael Lynch
- Producers: Craig Melville; David Curry

Original release
- Network: SBS
- Release: 7 November 2005 – 23 January 2006

Speaking in Tongues is an Australian television program broadcast on SBS Television. The first episode was broadcast on 7 November 2005. The series ran for twelve episodes, with the final episode airing on 23 January 2006.

The program is hosted by John Safran and Father Bob Maguire, who discuss current events from a religious perspective, often in a comedic manner. Maguire, a Catholic priest from South Melbourne, originally appeared on the early show John Safran vs God.

Speaking in Tongues was the first Australian television program to be released as a free podcast. The episodes were released for download on the morning following each week's broadcast .

The series was directed by John Safran vs God director Craig Melville.
