= Gaytime =

Gaytime may refer to:

- Golden Gaytime, an Australian ice cream brand
- Gaytime TV, a late-night BBC2 magazine programme
- Gaytime, a comic revue which starred British comedian Reg Varney

== See also ==
- Gay Times
