= Raspberry Cordial =

Australian hip-hop group

- Origin: Melbourne, Victoria, Australia
- Genres: Hip-hop
- Years active: 1991–1993
- Label: Independent
- Past members: Chris Lumsden; John Safran

Raspberry Cordial were an Australian hip-hop duo formed in 1991 by Chris Lumsden on keyboards and John Safran on lead vocals. George Weinberg played drums on the first rehearsal, but was quickly replaced with a drum machine. When the duo formed Safran was in Year 12 at Yeshivah College, an orthodox Jewish high school; while Lumsden was his friend.

They achieved some success, playing live shows in Melbourne, Geelong and Shepparton. They received heavy rotation airplay on local community radio, and were second in the RMIT Battle of the Bands competition. Their concert backstage rider asked for two drinks – anything more came out of the band's $60 performance fee.

Raspberry Cordial's first release was 1991's Melbourne Tram, on cassette of which Safran apparently has four hundred unsold copies. In 2002 on his TV series, Music Jamboree, Safran offered to send two copies of Melbourne Tram and an essay about the work to anyone who sent in their old copy, presumably worn out from overplay.

After winning a state government youth music initiative, Raspberry Cordial released Taste Test on CD in 1993. One of its tracks, "University Elevator Music", is available for download in MP3 format from Triple J (see here). Raspberry Cordial broke up after their second release, following negative comments made by Safran's then-girlfriend.

In June 2003 on ABC1 TV show, Enough Rope, Safran told the host, Andrew Denton, that "I just wanted to be a rapper, and I tried pretty damn hard... the world wasn't ready for white rappers then" and that they "broke down the wall that Eminem's been able to walk through".

== Discography ==
- Melbourne Tram (cassette, 1991)
- Taste Test (CD, 1993)
