= Ben Anderson (actor) =

Australian actor

Ben Anderson is an Australian actor from Melbourne, Australia. He is best known on Australian TV for his role on popular soap Neighbours as lawyer Tim Collins. In 2006–07, he was part of the ensemble cast of the second and third seasons of improvisational game-show Thank God You're Here, played various sketch characters on satirical news show Newstopia, and continued his work on Neighbours.

== Filmography ==
Year	Title	Role	Notes
2016	Nowhere Boys: The Book of Shadows	Ken Ferne	
2013-14	Wentworth	Detective Tanner	Guest Cast (1.2, 1,10, 2.12)
2013-2014	Nowhere Boys	Ken Ferne	
2012	House Husbands	Pete Rivers	
2008	The Hollowmen	Various	
2007	Newstopia	Various	
2006	Five Moments Of Infidelity	Conrad	
2006 – 2009	Thank God You're Here	Various	Ensemble cast
2004	Dentally Disturbed	Ed	
2004	skitHOUSE	Various	Also a writer
2003	Legacy Of The Silver Shadow	Travis Teale	
2003	Take Away	Builder	
2001–2005, 2007–2010, 2013–2022	Neighbours	Tim Collins	Recurring role
2001	Blonde	Drama Teacher	
1997	Brief Fiction	Dan	
