= In Bed with My Doona =

In Bed With My Doona

Studio album by The Bedroom Philosopher
- Released: 2005
- Recorded: July – October 2004; HumbleHouse Studios; Penrith, New South Wales, Australia
- Genre: Comedy rock
- Length: 54:14
- Labels: Nan and Pop Records
- Producer: Ken Heazlewood

The Bedroom Philosopher chronology
Living on the Edge of My Bed (2003)	In Bed With My Doona (2005)	Brown and Orange (2009)

In Bed With My Doona is the second album by Australian comedian/musician The Bedroom Philosopher and is a reference to the Madonna film Madonna: Truth or Dare which was known in some countries as In Bed with Madonna. It was released on Nan and Pop Records in 2005 (see 2005 in music).

The release was taken strongly by Triple J's audience, with the first single "I'm So Postmodern" reaching number 72 in the Hottest 100. Postmodern's music video was featured regularly on Rage (TV program) and was directed by The Bedroom Philosopher and comedian/writer/director, Dan Ilic.

Follow-up singles included "Folkstar" and "Golden Gaytime", a song about the ice cream bar of the same name.

The first 100 copies contain Track 16, "Special Features", which is a live track recorded at Mic in Hand comedy night, Friend in Hand Hotel, Sydney September 2004.

An additional 100 copies featured a special ‘coloured barcode’ but no live track, and were produced for the regional tour of Western Australia supporting Australian folk comedy trio Tripod.

== Track listing ==
1. Love Theme From Centrelink
2. Golden Gaytime
3. Megan The Vegan
4. I'm So Postmodern
5. McRock
6. Megan The Vegan (reprise)
7. Folkstar
8. High On Life
9. Kicking The Footy With God
10. You’re So Vague
11. Saving Myself For Marriage
12. Everybody’s Got The Same Insecurities As You
13. Happy Cow
14. The Heart Song
15. Folkstar Part II

== Personnel ==
=== Musicians ===
- Justin Heazlewood - Vocals and Guitar.

=== Technical ===
- Produced, recorded and mixed by Ken Heazlewood.
