= John Safran's Music Jamboree =

2002 Australian TV series

- Genre: Comedy; Documentary; Music
- Written by: John Safran; Mark O'Toole
- Directed by: Craig Melville, Richard Lowenstein, Lynn-Maree Milburn, Keri D. Light
- Presented by: John Safran
- Country of origin: Australia
- No. of seasons: 1
- No. of episodes: 10

Production
- Executive producer: Richard Lowenstein
- Producers: Richard Lowenstein, Selin Yaman and Ghost Pictures
- Production companies: Ghost Pictures Pty Ltd, Ghost of Your Ex-Boyfriend and SBS Independent

Original release
- Network: SBS television
- Release: 2002 – 2002

Related
- John Safran vs God

John Safran's Music Jamboree (or just Music Jamboree) is a light-hearted Australian music documentary television series, hosted by John Safran for SBS television. The program was produced by Richard Lowenstein, Selin Yaman and Ghost Pictures and directed by Craig Melville, Richard Lowenstein and a number of other directors under the production company Ghost of Your Ex-Boyfriend Productions in association with SBS Independent. It screened in 2002, and consisted of sketches and outlandish public stunts, typical of Safran's work. The series won two Australian Film Institute Awards; "Best Comedy Series" and "Most Innovative Program Concept". SBS followed the series up with the similarly styled John Safran vs God in 2004.

An infamous stunt of the series was sneaking nine friends into an exclusive Melbourne nightclub by dressing them up as the masked American metal band, Slipknot. The producers arranged entry for the impostors by pretending to be an American management company over the phone.

Other stunts included disguising himself as well known entertainers such as Ozzy Osbourne and Prince to harass the public, sketch versions of music videos such as Eminem, the creation of Jew Town, a Jewish boy band to compete with Christian pop, and returning to Yeshivah College to pay homage to Kevin Bacon in Footloose. He also details his time in the hip-hop group Raspberry Cordial, and the related incident in which he met the Beastie Boys and the band's former DJ attempted to steal his girlfriend at the time.

A regular segment on the series was "The Music Mole". In this segment a person dressed in a large mole costume (much like a mascot) was interviewed by Safran. The person was reported to be an insider (i.e. a mole) in the music industry who would reveal little known, often controversial facts about both the Australian and international music industries.
