= Murder in Mississippi (book) =

Book by John Safran

- Author: John Safran
- Language: English
- Genre: True crime
- Published: 25 September 2013
- Publisher: Hamish Hamilton (Penguin Books)
- Publication place: Australia; United States
- Pages: 368
- Awards: 2014 Ned Kelly Award for True Crime
- ISBN: 1926428463
- OCLC: 855788533

Murder in Mississippi: The True Story of How I Met a White Supremacist, Befriended His Black Killer and Wrote this Book is a 2013 true crime book written by Australian comedian and documentary-maker John Safran. It was published as God'll Cut You Down in the US. The book won the 2014 Ned Kelly Award for True Crime.

The book chronicles the events of Rankin County white supremacist Richard Barrett's murder by 23-year-old African-American Vincent McGee and explores the relationship between the two men.
