= Golden Gaytime =

Australian ice cream brand

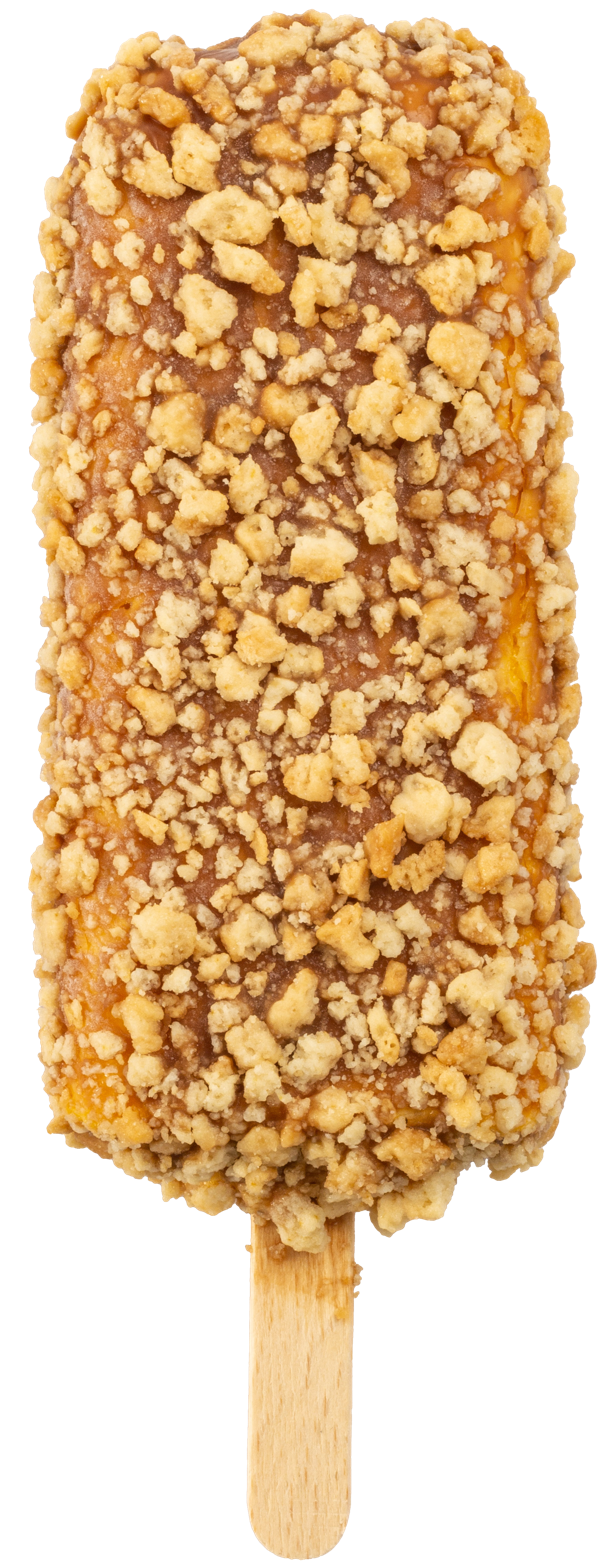
- An original flavour Golden Gaytime
- Alternative names: Cookie Crumble
- Type: Ice cream
- Course: Dessert
- Place of origin: Australia
- Invented: 1959; 67 years ago

Golden Gaytime (Cookie Crumble in New Zealand) is an ice cream snack that is made and distributed by the Streets confectionery company in Australia, and first released in 1970. It is a toffee and vanilla ice cream dipped in compound chocolate, and wrapped in vanilla biscuit-like "crumbs" on a wooden paddlepop-stick. Its name has survived intact regardless, or because, of the possible homosexual connotations in modern decades.

== Variations ==
On 4 August 2015, Streets released Golden Gaytime ice-cream tub format in addition to its usual popsicle stick format, as well as selling a tub of the ice cream's crumbs on the side. On 7 September 2016, Streets released the Golden Gaytime cross Cornetto cone – named Golden Gaynetto – in addition to other formats. In 2017, Streets released a Golden Gaytime ice-cream sandwich named the Golden Gaytime Sanga ("Sanga" being Australian slang for sandwich). A rainbow variant was also created in support of the LGBT community in 2017. In the summer of 2020, several locations in Melbourne and Sydney held pop-up stores that contained various exclusive crumb variations, ranging from vanilla crumb, musk sticks, strawberry hard candy, popping candy and edible glitter, to vanilla crumb, pretzel bits and salted caramel drizzle.

Gaytime has also collaborated with various other companies to release Gaytime-flavoured versions of their products, including Gaytime Krispy Kreme donuts, Gaytime Coco Pops, and various Gaytime dessert mixes made by Green's baking, including mousse, cake, brownies and brookies.

=== Flavours ===
Various flavours have been introduced, especially in the mid-2010s onwards, with some exclusive to particular stores (Krispy Kreme doughnut flavoured Golden Gaytime was initially released exclusively in Australian 7-Eleven stores). A plant-based version suitable for vegans was introduced in September 2022. Unlike most flavours, the plant-based option has remained a permanent fixture in their lineup.

| Flavour variety | Date introduced |
|---|---|
| Wild Strawberry | 1959 |
| Strawberry | 2015 |
| Mint | 2015 |
| Chocolate | 2015 |
| Unicorn | 2017 |
| Piña Colada | 2017 |
| Choc Mint McMint Face | 2017 |
| Choc Fever | 2018 |
| Salty | 2018 |
| Violet Crumble | 2019 |
| Krispy Kreme | 2020 |
| Birthday Cake | 2020 |
| Coco Pops | 2021 |
| Crunchy Nut | 2021 |
| Froot Loops | 2021 |
| Plant Based | 2022 |
| Oak Chocolate Milk | 2022 |
| Vanilla Malt Shake | 2023 |
| Strawberries and Cream | 2024 |
| (Inspired by) Caramel Slice | 2024 |

== Advertising ==
The company appears to embrace the camp name by retaining the tagline from the 1980s, "It's hard to have a Gaytime on your own". Footage from the 1980s commercials were reused in 2015 to celebrate the launch of the new flavours. The in-home boxes feature the words "4 delicious chances to have a gay time". Ads featuring the slogan also occasionally featured men who would accidentally get into risqué positions whilst trying to get a Gaytime. In 2009, Streets started re-airing a television commercial from the 1980s.

== Cultural impact ==
The double meaning of the name is highlighted in The Bedroom Philosopher song "Golden Gaytime".

In 2018, several Indonesians attempted to boycott Unilever over the product due to its name and the rainbow variant that was released in 2017 to support the LGBT community. Unilever Indonesia released a statement in support of the boycotters, but also pointed out that Gaytimes have never been sold in Indonesia either.

In early 2021, an online petition to change the product's name to something "less offensive" gained traction on social media. However, it was met with backlash by the general public, including counterpetitions, and the original petition to rename was withdrawn. Streets has stated that they would not change the product's name. In the same year, the name of the product was criticised by a Muslim association in Malaysia.

== See also ==
- Unilever
- Streets (ice cream)
