= Not the Sunscreen Song =

Single by John Safran
- Released: December 1997
- Studio: Kiss Studios, Melbourne
- Length: 5:20
- Label: Shock Records
- Songwriter(s): John Safran
- Producer(s): Andy Baldwin, John Safran

"Not the Sunscreen Song" is a song by Australian personality, John Safran released in December 1997.

The song is a parody of Baz Luhrmann's 1997 single "Everybody's Free (To Wear Sunscreen)" which is a recording of a spoken word of essay on how to live a happier life written as a hypothetical commencement speech by columnist Mary Schmich, in June 1997 via the Chicago Tribune. The song also sampled Luhrmann's remixed version of the song "Everybody's Free (To Feel Good)" by Rozalla.

"Not the Sunscreen Song" peaked at number 20 on the Australian ARIA Charts.

At the ARIA Music Awards of 1998, the song was nominated for Best Comedy Release.

In Triple M's 2005 Greatest Songs Ever Written and Performed Since the Beginning of Time poll, "Not the Sunscreen Song" came in at #706 – one spot above "Superstition" by Stevie Wonder.

== Track listing ==
CD single (huge009cds)
No.	Title	Length
1.	"Not the Sunscreen Song" (vocals Nick Disbray)	5:20
2.	"Track 2"	0.04
3.	"Track 3"	0:04

== Charts ==
Chart (1998)	Peak position
Australia (ARIA)	20
