= Brown and Orange =

Brown & Orange

Studio album by The Bedroom Philosopher
- Released: 2009
- Recorded: September 2006 – September 2008; The Soft Centre; Northcote, Melbourne, Australia
- Genre: Comedy rock
- Length: 53:25
- Label: Nan and Pop Records
- Producer: The Bedroom Philosopher with Chris Scallan, Martin "Moose" Lubran and Ken Heazlewood

The Bedroom Philosopher chronology
In Bed with My Doona (2005)	Brown & Orange (2009)	Songs from the 86 Tram (2010)

Brown & Orange is an album by the Australian folk comedian The Bedroom Philosopher (Justin Heazlewood) released in February 2009. It was produced by Chris Scallan, Martin "Moose" Lubran and Ken Heazlewood.

It is the second album by The Bedroom Philosopher, following In Bed with My Doona in 2005, which contained his radio hit "I'm So Post Modern", the most popular independently released Australian single in 2005, reaching number 72 in the following year's Triple J Hottest 100.

The music video for the album's second single, "Wow Wow's Song", acquired 20,000 plays on YouTube within its first five days of release and garnered many impressive statistics in Australia, New Zealand and globally.

Concerts performed in 2008 as The Bedroom Philosopher and His Awkwardstra premiered many of the songs on the album.

== Personnel ==
- Justin Heazlewood - vocals, guitar
- Martin "Moose" Lubran - keyboards, guitar, percussion, vibraphone
- Haydn Meggit - drums
- John Maddox - double bass
- Andy Hazel - bass guitar
- Harry Angus - trumpet
- Tripod - backing vocals
- Wow Wow - vocals
- Xani Colac - violin
- Michael O'Connor - flute
- Hanna Silver - piano, synthesizers
- Anna Knight - vocals
- Will Hindmarsh - harmonica
- Miles O'Neil - banjo

== Track listing ==
1. "Strange Piece of Music"
2. "Party in My Head"
3. "What Am I Supposed to Be Doing?"
4. "The Happiest Boy"
5. "I'm So Lonely"
6. "(Brown)"
7. "Jesus on Big Brother"
8. "For the Love I Have for You"
9. "Circus Bear"
10. "(Orange)"
11. "Swan Song"
12. "Deux Cygnes Noirs"
13. "Wow Wow's Song (La La La)"
14. "(Social Life at the Psychiatric Unit 30.07.77)"

== Singles ==
- "The Happiest Boy" was released as a single in September 2007.
- "Wow Wow's Song", in an edited format, was released as a single in October 2008.
- "Party In My Head" was released in March 2009
