= Wear Sunscreen =

1997 essay by Mary Schmich

"Advice, like youth, probably just wasted on the young", commonly known by the title "Wear Sunscreen", is an essay written as a hypothetical commencement speech by columnist Mary Schmich, originally published in the June 1, 1997, issue of the Chicago Tribune. The essay, giving various pieces of advice on how to live a happier life and avoid common frustrations, spread massively via viral email, is often erroneously described as a commencement speech given by author Kurt Vonnegut at MIT.

The essay became the basis for a successful spoken word song released in 1997 by Baz Luhrmann, "Everybody's Free (To Wear Sunscreen)", also known as "The Sunscreen Song". The song reached number one in Ireland and the United Kingdom and inspired numerous parodies.

== Chicago Tribune column ==
Mary Schmich's column "Advice, like youth, probably just wasted on the young" was published in the Chicago Tribune on June 1, 1997. In the column's introduction, Schmich presents the essay as the commencement speech she would give if she were asked to give one.

In the speech, she insistently recommends the wearing of sunscreen, and dispenses other advice and warnings which are intended to help people live a happier life and avoid common frustrations. She later explained that the inspiration came from seeing a young woman sunbathing, and hoping that she was wearing sunscreen, unlike Schmich herself at that age.

The essay soon became the subject of an urban legend which claimed it was an MIT commencement speech given by author Kurt Vonnegut. In reality, MIT's commencement speaker in 1997 was Kofi Annan and Vonnegut had never been a commencement speaker there. Despite a follow-up article by Schmich on August 3, 1997, the story became so widespread that Vonnegut's lawyer began receiving requests to reprint the speech. Vonnegut commented that he would have been proud had the words been his.

Schmich published a short gift book adaptation of the essay, Wear Sunscreen: A Primer for Real Life, in 1998. A tenth anniversary edition was published in 2008.

== Baz Luhrmann version ==
"Everybody's Free (To Wear Sunscreen)"

Single by Baz Luhrmann

from the album Something for Everybody
- B-side: "Love Is in the Air"
- Released: 1997
- Genre: Spoken word
- Length: 7:09 (album version); 5:05 (radio edit)
- Label: EMI; Capitol
- Songwriters: Mary Schmich; Nigel Swanston; Tim Cox
- Producers: Baz Luhrmann; Josh Abrahams; Nellee Hooper

The essay was used in its entirety by Australian film director Baz Luhrmann on his 1998 album Something for Everybody, as "Everybody's Free (To Wear Sunscreen)". Also known as "The Sunscreen Song", it samples Luhrmann's remixed version of the song "Everybody's Free (To Feel Good)" by Rozalla, and opens with the words, "Ladies and Gentlemen of the Class of '99" (instead of "'97", as in the original column). The song features a spoken-word track set over a mellow backing track. The "Wear Sunscreen" speech is narrated by Australian voice actor Lee Perry. The backing is the choral version of "Everybody's Free (To Feel Good)", a 1991 song by Rozalla, used in Luhrmann's film William Shakespeare's Romeo + Juliet. The chorus, also from "Everybody's Free", is sung by Quindon Tarver.

=== Background ===
Luhrmann explained that Anton Monsted, Josh Abrahams, and he were working on the remix when Monsted received an email with the supposed Vonnegut speech. They decided to use it but were doubtful of getting through to Vonnegut for permission before their deadline, which was only one or two days away. While searching the Internet for contact information they came upon the "Sunscreen" authorship controversy and discovered that Schmich was the actual author. They emailed her and, with her permission, recorded the song the next day.

=== Release ===
Originally released on the album Something for Everybody (1997), "Everybody's Free (To Wear Sunscreen)" gained popularity in 1998 in some areas of the US, when a Portland radio station started to air it. The single came out in 1999.

"Everybody's Free (To Wear Sunscreen)" was released as a single in some territories in 1997, with the speech (including its opening words, "Ladies and Gentlemen of the Class of '97") completely intact. This version appeared in the Triple J Hottest 100 of that year at number 16 in the countdown, and was released on the subsequent CD in early 1998. A limited-edition CD single was issued in the United States on February 9, 1999, but only in the Pacific Northwest region. In the United Kingdom, the song was released on May 31, 1999.

=== Versions ===
There are four versions of the song: the original 7:09 minute mix from the album Baz Luhrmann Presents: Something for Everybody; a 1999 single release which features a 5:05 minute edit that lacks both choruses; "Geographic's Factor 15+ Mix" that runs for 4:42 minutes; and a "2007 Mix" of the original 7:09 minute version released on the 10th Anniversary Edition of the William Shakespeare's Romeo + Juliet soundtrack, on which the opening words are changed to "Ladies and gentlemen of the class of 2007".

The song also appeared in Germany and was soon followed by a German version with the title "Sonnencreme". The German translation is narrated by the German actor Dieter Brandecker. A Brazilian version, entitled "Filtro Solar", is narrated in Portuguese by journalist and TV presenter Pedro Bial and was released in the last 2003 edition of the program Fantástico, on Rede Globo. This version became a radio success in 2004. A Russian adaptation of the song, recorded live by Silver Rain Radio, was performed by Alex Dubas and Yolka. An Israeli adaptation of the song, named "Matters One Should Know" (דברים שכדאי לדעת), was recorded and released for the Israeli Children's channel in 2004 by Avri Gilad, Rinat Gabay and MC Shiri. Other versions include a Finnish version titled "Aurinkovoiteella onneen", performed by Erkki Saarela, and a Belgian version called "Beslis zelf maar (of je zonnemelk gebruikt)", performed by Frank Aendenboom.

=== Critical reception ===
Daily Record wrote, "Luhrmann's single is the biggest spoken-word hit since JJ Barrie topped the charts with 'No Charge' in 1976. The lyrics began life as a newspaper article." James Oldham from NME commented, "Unless you have been holidaying on Jupiter for the last two months, this remarkable and potentially nauseating record will have burrowed its way into your deep subconscious by now." He added, "Luhrmann's postmodern masterpiece is half pisstake, half soul-soothing brain massage and all genius; a DIY pop landmark for the end of the self-help decade. Buy this record. Twenty years from now, in ways you can't even begin to imagine today, you will be glad you did."

=== Chart performance ===
The song was a top-10 hit across Europe but was largely obscure in the US until Aaron Scofield, a producer in Phoenix, edited the original 12-inch version into a segment of a syndicated radio show called Modern Mix. This show played on many stations in the United States. In Portland, Oregon—where Modern Mix played on KNRK—listeners began requesting the track. KNRK program director Mark Hamilton edited the song for time and began playing it regularly. He distributed the song to other program directors that he networked with and the song exploded in the US. The song reached number 24 on the Billboard Hot 100 Airplay in the United States; by the time it was released as a commercial single in the country, radio airplay had declined significantly, and only managed to peak at number 45 on the Billboard Hot 100. In Canada the song peaked at number 11 on the RPM Top Singles chart and topped the RPM Adult Contemporary chart. It also reached number one in the United Kingdom and Ireland, partly due to a media campaign by Radio One DJ Chris Moyles. On August 10, 2008, the song re-entered the UK Singles Chart at number 72.

=== Music video ===
There are two videos for the song: one which uses the 1999 5:05 minute single edit of the song (the version in which Quindon Tarver is not featured), directed and animated by Bill Barminski; and another using the 7:09 minute edit made by the Brazilian advertising agency DM9DDB.

=== Track listings ===
UK CD and cassette single

1. "Everybody's Free (To Wear Sunscreen)" (performed by Quindon Tarver—edit) – 5:05
2. "Everybody's Free (To Wear Sunscreen)" (performed by Lee Parry—Geographic's Factor 15+ mix) – 4:42
3. "Love Is in the Air" (performed by John Paul Young—Fran mix) – 4:29

European CD single

1. "Everybody's Free (To Wear Sunscreen)" (performed by Quindon Tarver—edit) – 5:05
2. "Everybody's Free (To Wear Sunscreen)" (performed by Lee Parry—Geographic's Factor 15+ mix) – 4:42

US CD single

1. "Everybody's Free (To Wear Sunscreen)" (performed by Quindon Tarver—edit)
2. "I'm Losing You" (performed by Lani—Day mix)

=== Charts ===
==== Weekly charts ====
| Chart (1997–1999) | Peak position |
|---|---|
| Australia (ARIA) | 65 |
| Belgium (Ultratop 50 Flanders) | 31 |
| Canada Top Singles (RPM) | 11 |
| Canada Adult Contemporary (RPM) | 1 |
| Denmark (IFPI) | 13 |
| Europe (Eurochart Hot 100) | 9 |
| Germany (GfK) | 44 |
| Ireland (IRMA) | 1 |
| Netherlands (Dutch Top 40) | 29 |
| Netherlands (Single Top 100) | 26 |
| Norway (VG-lista) | 8 |
| Scottish Singles Sales (Official Charts) | 1 |
| Sweden (Sverigetopplistan) | 15 |
| Switzerland (Schweizer Hitparade) | 36 |
| UK Singles (Official Charts) | 1 |
| US Billboard Hot 100 | 45 |
| US Adult Contemporary (Billboard) | 27 |
| US Adult Pop Airplay (Billboard) | 10 |
| US Pop Airplay (Billboard) | 17 |

==== Year-end charts ====
| Chart (1999) | Position |
|---|---|
| Canada Top Singles (RPM) | 66 |
| Canada Adult Contemporary (RPM) | 36 |
| Netherlands (Dutch Top 40) | 171 |
| UK Singles (OCC) | 31 |
| US Adult Top 40 (Billboard) | 66 |

=== Certifications ===
| Region | Certification | Certified units/sales |
|---|---|---|
| United Kingdom (BPI) | Platinum | 600,000^{^} |
^{^} Shipments figures based on certification alone.

=== Release history ===
| Region | Date | Format(s) | Label(s) | Ref. |
|---|---|---|---|---|
| Various | 1997 | —N/a | EMI; Capitol | |
| United States | February 9, 1999 | Limited-edition CD | Capitol | |
| United Kingdom | May 31, 1999 | CD; cassette | EMI; Capitol | |

== Parodies ==
The Baz Luhrmann song version inspired numerous parodies. In December 1997, John Safran released a song entitled "Not the Sunscreen Song" which peaked at number 20 in Australia.

American comedian Chris Rock enjoyed great success with his spoken word song "No Sex (In the Champagne Room)" featuring Gerald Levert from his television special and album Bigger & Blacker, which was in turn parodied on Mad TV as "Ain't No Blacks on the TV Screen" in the style of Rock's stand-up. The song was also parodied in an episode of House of Mouse performed by Jiminy Cricket (voiced by Eddie Carroll). The comedy group Three Dead Trolls in a Baggie also made a parody entitled "The Sunscreen Marketing Board". Jegsy Dodd and the Original Sinners' version, "Grumpy Old Men", was voted favourite track of 2005 by BBC Radio 1 listeners in their annual Festive 50 poll.

Angelos Epithemiou's live tour included a parody of the song titled "Don't Muck About".

A parody entitled "Mow Against The Grain" by the Hill Family Singers appears on the 1999 King of the Hill soundtrack album.

Another parody by comedian Simmi Areff was played on South African radio station East Coast Radio at the conclusion of the 2010 FIFA World Cup.

An additional parody was created in 1999 by London Capital Radio Breakfast Show host Chris Tarrant, who created a version called "Wear Slippers" which consisted of him reading an alternative version of the sunscreen lyrics and demonstrated his disdain for Baz Luhrmann's version.

In the commencement speech that he gave at his own graduation from UCSF in 1999, which went viral on YouTube, ZDoggMD instructed newly minted physicians that they should "wear shoe covers" because the hospital is "a dangerous place for expensive shoes".

In 2016, musician and software developer Dylan Beattie created a parody entitled "Flatscreens" with the original lyrics reworked as advice for a career in software development.

== Bibliography ==
- Wear Sunscreen (Andrews McMeel Publishing, 1998) ISBN 0-8362-5528-3
