= Richard Barrett (lawyer) =

American lawyer (1943–2010)

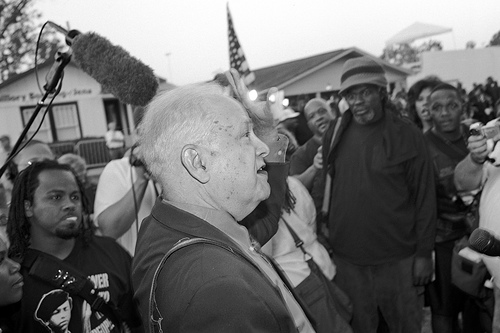
- Barrett at the September 20, 2007 Jena Six Rally, Jena, Louisiana
- Born: February 18, 1943; New York City, U.S.
- Died: April 22, 2010 (aged 67); Jackson, Mississippi, U.S.
- Cause of death: Stab wounds
- Occupations: Lawyer, White Nationalist
- Known for: Founded the Mississippi branch of the Nationalist Movement

Richard Barrett (February 18, 1943 – April 22, 2010) was an American white nationalist, lawyer and self-proclaimed leader in the nationalist Skinheadz movement. Barrett was a speaker and editor of the All The Way monthly newsletter. He was general counsel of the white nationalist organisation, Nationalist Movement, which he founded in Mississippi.

== Early life ==
Barrett was born in New York City, and according to his biography, his family moved away to avoid the influx of Jewish and Puerto Rican immigrants. He graduated from Rutgers University, and fought in the Vietnam War. He graduated from Memphis State University Law School in 1974.

== Political career ==
In 1968, Barrett served as executive director of the South Carolina branch of the American Independent Party, on behalf of George C. Wallace's presidential bid. He organized and chaired Youth for Wallace and in 1969, he organized and chaired the National Youth Alliance (which later transformed into the National Alliance). In 1976, he was chairman of Democrats for Reagan and in 1977, he served as judge-advocate of the Veterans of Foreign Wars.

== Writings and activities ==
In 1982, Barrett published The Commission, a memoir advocating the resettlement of "those who were once citizens" to "Puerto Rico, Mexico, Israel, the Orient, and Africa." Contending that non-whites, especially blacks, were inferior: "The Negro race... possess[es] no creativity of its own [and] pulls the vitality away from civilization." He advocated sterilization and abortions of the "unfit".

In 1989, Barrett visited England. He attended the Annual General Meeting of the National Front political party where he signed "The New Atlantic Charter" pledging solidarity between the party and the Nationalist Movement. There he linked up with Alan Harvey to support apartheid in South Africa. The following year, Barrett played host to Nick Griffin.

In 1992, Barrett argued the case of Forsyth County, Georgia v. The Nationalist Movement before the United States Supreme Court. In 2004, Barrett organized a booth at the Neshoba County Fair in Mississippi for the public to shake hands with Edgar Ray Killen and sign a petition of support. Killen, who did not appear at the aforementioned event, was later convicted of manslaughter for his role in the 1964 Ku Klux Klan-led murders of Chaney, Goodman, and Schwerner. In an interview, Barrett predicted that the nation would rally around Killen. Barrett represented Tennessee activist James L. Hart in 2006, when Hart was removed from the ballot by the GOP on the grounds of not being a bona fide member of the party due to his promotion of eugenics. Barrett's efforts were not successful, and Hart was forced to run as a write-in candidate.

== Death ==
On Thursday April 22, 2010, a neighbor called 911 at around 8:00 AM and reported seeing smoke coming from inside Barrett's home. Firefighters arrived and found Barrett's corpse near the back door of the house, which was unlocked. He had been beaten and stabbed to death by a 23-year-old black male, Vincent Justin McGee. After stealing a wallet and a gun from the victim, McGee set fire to the corpse and was apprehended within hours. At trial, McGee claimed that Barrett had dropped his pants and asked McGee to perform a sexual act on him, sending McGee into a panic. An autopsy revealed that Barrett suffered multiple stab wounds to his neck area, blunt force trauma to the head, and fractured ribs. He had been stabbed a total of 35 times. McGee was on probation after having been released in February from the Mississippi State Penitentiary (Parchman) in Sunflower County. He had been serving a six-year sentence for assault and grand larceny and had been eligible for release in December 2010, but was released early due to overcrowding in the prison. He was staying at his mother's house three doors down from the Barrett residence at the time of the murder.

After being apprehended, McGee provided the police with information which led to the arrests of three more suspects. Michael Dent, Vicky Dent, and Albert Lewis were each charged with accessory after the fact and arson. McGee pleaded guilty to manslaughter, arson, and burglary on July 28, 2011. He was sentenced to 20 years on the manslaughter charge, 20 years on the arson charge, and 25 years on the burglary charge – 65 years in total.

Jerry Mitchell, the famed investigative reporter noted for his coverage of Civil Rights-era murders and injustices that had long been disregarded, including the murder of Medgar Evers, covered Barrett's political activities at length. Though an ardent opponent of Barrett's political positions, Mitchell called Barrett a "victim of hate" and noted, "No one deserves to be beaten and stabbed 35 times before being set on fire. No one deserves to die from the hands of hate, not even someone who has sown its seeds for a lifetime."

Barrett's murder is the subject of the book God'll Cut You Down aka Murder in Mississippi by John Safran.
