= SBS independent =

Australian film commissioning organisation

SBS Independent
- Type: Division of Special Broadcasting Service
- Industry: Television production
- Founded: August 1994
- Defunct: December 2007
- Fate: Merged with SBS Content and Online Division
- Products: Television series, documentaries, feature films, animation
- Parent: Special Broadcasting Service

SBS independent (SBSi) operated as the commissioning house for Australia's multicultural public broadcaster, the Special Broadcasting Service (SBS), between August 1994 and December 2007.

== History ==
SBS independent was instituted via the landmark "Creative Nation" cultural policy initiative released in October 1994 by the Keating government. The core purpose of the institution was to commission multicultural content from Australian independent film and television producers. At the end of December 2007, SBSi ceased to function as an administratively independent institution, and was merged with the SBS Content and Online Division.

== Selections ==
For the 13 years that it operated, SBSi commissioned more than 810 titles spanning feature film, animation, television drama, documentary, comedy, variety and reality programs, totalling over 1500 hours of content. This content was often commissioned from inexperienced and early-career television and filmmakers, many of whom come from non-English speaking and Indigenous backgrounds. SBSi titles have attracted significant critical acclaim internationally, winning in excess of 450 awards, including a 2003 Academy Award for Adam Elliot's animated short film, Harvie Krumpet.

== Impact and significance ==
SBSi was a significant cultural institution that reshaped production and representational practices in the Australian film and television sectors. Most significantly, through collaborative partnerships with other federal and state film financing organisations, SBSi helped to nurture a new generation of Indigenous filmmakers, including Ivan Sen, Warwick Thornton and Rachel Perkins.

SBSi commissioned feature films, drama series, animation, single documentaries, and documentary series.

== Productions ==
Films commissioned by SBSi include:

=== Animation ===
- Animated Tales of the World
- Bobtales
- Harvie Krumpet
- John Callahan's Quads!
- Leunig
- The Mysterious Geographic Explorations of Jasper Morello

=== Comedy ===
- Wilfred
- Pizza (TV series)

=== Documentary ===
- The Prodigal Son
- Australia By Numbers series
- Fond Memories of Cuba
- Golden Sandals: The Art of Reg Mombassa
- John Safran's Music Jamboree
- John Safran vs God
- Nerds F.C.
- Poles Apart
- Sydney 2000
- The Animated Leunig
- Decadence
- Bush School

=== Films ===
- Australian Rules
- Beneath Clouds
- The Boys
- City Loop
- Dirty War
- Floating Life
- Fresh Air
- Habibi Jammin'
- Jewboy
- Kabbarli
- Kidnapped!
- La Spagnola
- Look Both Ways
- Mallboy
- Martha's New Coat
- Mullet
- Nijinsky
- Pioneers of Love
- Plains Empty
- The Quiet Room
- Radiance
- Shit Skin (IDI3)
- Silent Partner
- Submariners
- Teesh And Trude
- Ten Canoes
- The Illustrated Family Doctor
- The Tracker
- Walking on Water
- Yolngu Boy
