= Lawrence Leung's Unbelievable =

2011 Australian comedy TV series

- Promotional title image
- Genre: Comedy
- Directed by: Craig Melville, Nathan Earl
- Starring: Lawrence Leung
- Composer: Peter Isaac
- Country of origin: Australia
- Original language: English
- No. of seasons: 1
- No. of episodes: 6

Production
- Executive producers: Martin Robertson and Julian Morrow (for Chaser Broadcasting); Ian Knight (for ABC TV)
- Producers: Nathan Earl, Craig Melville
- Running time: 26 minutes

Original release
- Network: ABC1
- Release: 15 June – 20 July 2011

Lawrence Leung's Unbelievable is a six-part Australian television comedy series, starring and primarily written by Melbourne comedian Lawrence Leung and produced by Unbelievable Productions.

In each episode, Leung—a self-confessed sceptic—investigates a type of paranormal phenomenon such as psychics, ghosts, UFOs, magic and psychological manipulation. In the final episode, Leung conducts an elaborate experiment to attempt to turn a sceptic into a believer in the paranormal.

== Episodes ==
#	Title	Airdate	Timeslot	Ratings (Note: Overall national viewers, numbers in brackets indicate nightly ratings position.)
Series 1 (2011)
1	"Psychics"	15 June 2011	Wednesday 9:30 pm – 10:00 pm	457,000 (25th)
2	"Ghosts"	22 June 2011	Wednesday 9:30 pm – 10:00 pm	474,000 (27th)
3	"UFOs"	29 June 2011	Wednesday 9:30 pm – 10:00 pm	432,000 (30th)
4	"Magic"	6 July 2011	Wednesday 9:30 pm – 10:00 pm	414,000 (28th)
5	"Manipulation"	13 July 2011	Wednesday 9:30 pm – 10:00 pm	380,000 (28th)
6	"The Experiment"	20 July 2011	Wednesday 9:30 pm – 10:00 pm	375,000 (29th)
Average series ratings				422,000
