= Forsyth County v. Nationalist Movement =

Forsyth County, Georgia v. The Nationalist Movement
- Supreme Court of the United States

Argued March 31, 1992 Decided June 19, 1992
- Full case name: Forsyth County, Georgia, Petitioner v. The Nationalist Movement
- Citations: 505 U.S. 123 (more) 112 S.Ct. 2395; 120 L. Ed. 2d 101

Case history
- Prior: Nationalist Movement v. City of Cumming, Forsyth Cty., Ga., 913 F.2d 885 (11th Cir. 1990), rehearing en banc granted, 921 F.2d 1125 (11th Cir. 1990); panel opinion reinstated on rehearing, 934 F.2d 1482 (11th Cir. 1991); cert. granted, 502 U.S. 1023 (1992).
- Subsequent: On remand, Nationalist Movement v. City of Cumming, Ga., 92 F.3d 1135 (11th Cir. 1996).

Holding
- An ordinance which charges more than a nominal fee for use of a public forum is unconstitutional.

Court membership
- Chief Justice William Rehnquist Associate Justices Byron White · Harry Blackmun; John P. Stevens · Sandra Day O'Connor; Antonin Scalia · Anthony Kennedy; David Souter · Clarence Thomas

Case opinions
- Majority: Blackmun, joined by Stevens, O'Connor, Kennedy, Souter
- Dissent: Rehnquist, joined by White, Scalia, Thomas

Laws applied
- U.S. Const. amend. I

Forsyth County, Georgia v. The Nationalist Movement, 505 U.S. 123 (1992), was a case in which the United States Supreme Court limited the ability of local governments to charge fees for the use of public places for private activities. By a 5–4 vote, the court ruled that an ordinance allowing the local government to set varying fees for different events violated the First Amendment due to the lack of "narrowly drawn, reasonable, and definite standards" governing the amount of the fee.

== Background ==
Prior Supreme Court opinions had held that public officials could charge fees as a pre-condition for activists to assemble in public places or march down public streets. The rationale was that a fee to recover the costs of police protection, clean-up, and administrative costs did not violate the right to speak and assemble under the First Amendment. The fees sometimes ranged into the millions of dollars.

On January 17, 1987, a group of ninety demonstrators conducted a "March Against Fear and Intimidation" in Cumming, Forsyth County, Georgia that was met by as many as three hundred counter-protesters including the Forsyth County Defense League (an independent affiliate of the Nationalist Movement, which advocates the expulsion of all non-whites from the United States) and the Ku Klux Klan. According to Forsyth County, Georgia at least eight counter-protesters were arrested on charges of carrying concealed weapons and trespassing. The following weekend, January 24, 1987, there was a civil rights march attended by 20,000 integrationists, including civil rights leaders, U.S. senators and other senior officials. They were met again by counter-protesters led by The Nationalist Movement.

Sixty-six Nationalists were arrested on charges of parading without a permit. In the aftermath, all Nationalists were acquitted. In U.S. Federal District Court in Atlanta, Judge William Clark O'Kelley dismissed the case, threatened to charge the Nationalists with perjury, fined them $8,000.00 for bringing a "frivolous" lawsuit and barred Richard Barrett, who also served as the Nationalists' attorney, from his court.

On appeal to the U.S. Court of Appeals for the 11th Circuit, Barrett argued that no fees whatsoever could be charged; however, the court ruled for the Nationalists on the grounds that a "nominal" fee could be charged. Although there was a dispute over what was "nominal," O'Kelley was reversed and the fines were vacated. O'Kelley rescinded his ban on the Nationalists' attorney. Forsyth County appealed to the U.S. Supreme Court, which granted certiorari. Robert S. Stubbs III and Gordon A. Smith, arguing on behalf of Forsyth County, insisted that the Girl Scouts and a local track club had been charged nominal fees, so the Nationalists were being treated equally. The American Civil Liberties Union filed an amicus brief in which they contended that a nominal fee of $100.00 sufficed.

== Opinion of the Court ==
The Supreme Court ruled 5–4 in favor of the Nationalists on the ground that the ordinance unconstitutionally permitted the county to charge differing fees to different groups without any objective standards to prevent the county from basing the fee on the political views that a group sought to express. The court held that the ordinance violated the First Amendment due to the lack of "narrowly drawn, reasonable, and definite standards" governing the amount of the fee.

Nothing in the law or its application prevents the official from encouraging some views and discouraging others through the arbitrary application of fees. The First Amendment prohibits the vesting of such unbridled discretion in a government official.

The majority rejected Forsyth County's argument that the ordinance was content-neutral because it was aimed at offsetting the cost of maintaining public order:

The costs to which petitioner refers are those associated with the public's reaction to the speech. Listeners' reaction to speech is not a content-neutral basis for regulation.

== Subsequent developments ==
The holding immediately impacted Simi Valley, California, which had banned the Nationalists on the grounds that they did not comply with regulations mandating a thirty-day waiting-period and that providing police protection was "too costly." The city immediately rescinded its objections and provided police-protection.

In 2000, Morris County, New Jersey, sued the Nationalists, alleging that they could not parade and rally because they refused to post a $8 million bond. The Nationalists removed the case from state court to federal court in Newark, where Judge John W. Bissell held, in Morris County, New Jersey v. The Nationalist Movement, that although the bond was unconstitutional, officials could impose a "hold-harmless" clause, requiring the Nationalists to pay for damages caused by rioters against them. Bissell, also, refused to award attorney fees. On appeal to the U.S. Court of Appeals for the Third Circuit, Bissell was reversed, all restrictions were struck down and substantial attorney fees awarded to the Nationalists. The U.S. Park Service immediately removed its requirement for similar fees and bonds, which it had interposed for the Nationalists' rally at the Liberty Bell. The event then proceeded, without restrictions and with full police protection. In the end, two Nationalists, Joshua Laub and Mathew McSweeney Sheard, were arrested for knocking over a speaker.

== See also ==
- The Nationalist Movement
- Richard Barrett (lawyer)
- List of United States Supreme Court cases, volume 505
- List of United States Supreme Court cases
- Lists of United States Supreme Court cases by volume
- List of United States Supreme Court cases by the Rehnquist Court
