= Nationalist Movement =

White nationalist organization

The Nationalist Movement uses a variation of the Hungarian Arrow Cross, called the Crosstar, as its logo.

The Nationalist Movement is a Mississippi-founded white nationalist organization with headquarters in Georgia that advocates what it calls a "pro-majority" position. It has been called white supremacist by the Associated Press and Anti-Defamation League, among others. After Richard Barrett was murdered, he was succeeded by Thomas Reiter with a unanimous vote. The original secretary was Barry Hackney, but the position of Secretary was later discontinued by Thomas Reiter. The new leader, Thomas Reiter saved most Nationalist Movement assets and intellectual property after Barrett's murder. The symbol of the movement is the Crosstar. In 2012, Travis Golie was sworn in as the Leader of The Nationalist Movement as endorsed by the former leader. Like Reiter, Golie was an original Barrett-era Nationalist Movement member. Golie returned The Nationalist Movement headquarters to the South where it originated.

== Lawsuits ==
In 1987, the movement applied for 501(c)(3) non-profit status. This status was denied due to the organization's use of resources for non-charitable purposes. The movement filed a lawsuit challenging the decision on constitutional grounds, but was defeated. The movement was active in protests against Martin Luther King Jr. Day in Atlanta, Georgia in 1989. Its Neighborhood, Home, Family and Country parade and rally in South Boston drew crowds and police. It held a demonstration in Simi Valley, California in 1992, in defense of the police officers accused of beating Rodney King. In 1993, it held a "Majority-Rights Freedom Rally" at the Colorado State Capitol, in opposition to gay rights.

In 1992, it won in the United States Supreme Court, in Forsyth County, Georgia v. The Nationalist Movement, establishing new First Amendment jurisprudence, which lifted bans on its use of public property and mandated police protection for its parades and rallies. It was sued in 1993 by the Texas Human Rights Commission, alleging that it violated the federal housing bill, but it won the case and had prohibitions against free speech stricken from federal housing regulations. Financial support came from donations of members and occasional court-awarded damages from opponents. It sees itself as policing the ranks of nationalists, often supporting the prosecution of white supremacists, such as Matthew Hale and David Duke.

== Crosstar ==
Crosstar, the website of the Nationalist Movement, was launched on June 13, 1996. Richard Barrett served as administrator from its founding until his death in 2010 at which time Thomas Reiter was unanimously elected as First Officer and Administrator of Crosstar. On November 11, 2011, the site relaunched in a modern, social network format. The site ceased operation in 2016.

== All The Way ==
All The Way was the official organ of the Nationalist Movement from 1987 to 1996, published monthly at Learned, Mississippi. Correspondents included Travis Golie, Barry Hackney and Gerald McManus.

It was founded in June 1987. Richard Barrett served as editor from its founding until his death in 2010. In 1996, the publication migrated to the Internet, appearing in both print and online versions.

The newspaper maintained editorial policies in favor of what it termed "majority-rule democracy." It reported current events from a white supremacist standpoint, including appeals from Marines and others to get out of Iraq and Afghanistan. All The Way showcased white supremacists, notably Edgar Ray Killen, and billed itself as "the longest-running continually published nationalist newspaper."

== See also ==
- List of white nationalist organizations
