= Maximum Choppage =

Television series

- Genre: Comedy
- Directed by: Craig Melville
- Starring: Lawrence Leung; Stephanie Son; Dave Eastgate
- Country of origin: Australia
- No. of seasons: 1
- No. of episodes: 6

Production
- Executive producers: Debbie Lee; Tony Ayres
- Producers: Sophie Miller, Julie Eckersley, Linda Micsko
- Running time: 29 minutes per episode
- Production company: Matchbox Pictures

Original release
- Network: ABC2
- Release: 24 February – 31 March 2015

Maximum Choppage is an Australian television comedy series starring Lawrence Leung. The six-part series premiered in 2015 on ABC2. It is directed by Craig Melville and written by Leung, Duncan Sarkies and Josh Mapleston. It is produced by Julie Eckersley, Sophie Miller and Linda Micsko with executive producers Tony Ayres and Debbie Lee. The series is based on the film work of Timothy Ly which was developed into the TV series by Matchbox Pictures.

== Cast ==
Lawrence Leung stars as Simon Chan

- Lawrence Leung as Simon Chan
- Dave Eastgate as Egg
- Stephanie Son as Petal
- Darren Gilshenan as Mayor Crawford
- Georgina Haig as Elle
- Jason Chong as Pump'd
- Anthony Brandon Wong as Le Bok
- Andy Trieu as Fury
- Felino Dolloso as Kai Le
- Kathryn Yuen as Mother
- Tiriel Mora as Barry St Clair

== Episodes ==
=== Season 1 (2015) ===
No. overall	No. in season	Title	Directed by	Written by	Original release date
1	1	"Episode 1"	Craig Melville	Lawrence Leung & Duncan Sarkies	24 February 2015
2	2	"Episode 2"	Craig Melville	Josh Mapleston & Duncan Sarkies	3 March 2015
3	3	"Episode 3"	Craig Melville	Duncan Sarkies	10 March 2015
4	4	"Episode 4"	Craig Melville	Lawrence Leung	17 March 2015
5	5	"Episode 5"	Craig Melville	Duncan Sarkies & Lawrence Leung	24 March 2015
6	6	"Episode 6"	Craig Melville	Lawrence Leung	31 March 2015

== See also ==
- List of Australian television series
- List of programs broadcast by ABC (Australian TV network)
