= Justin Heazlewood =

Australian musician and comedian

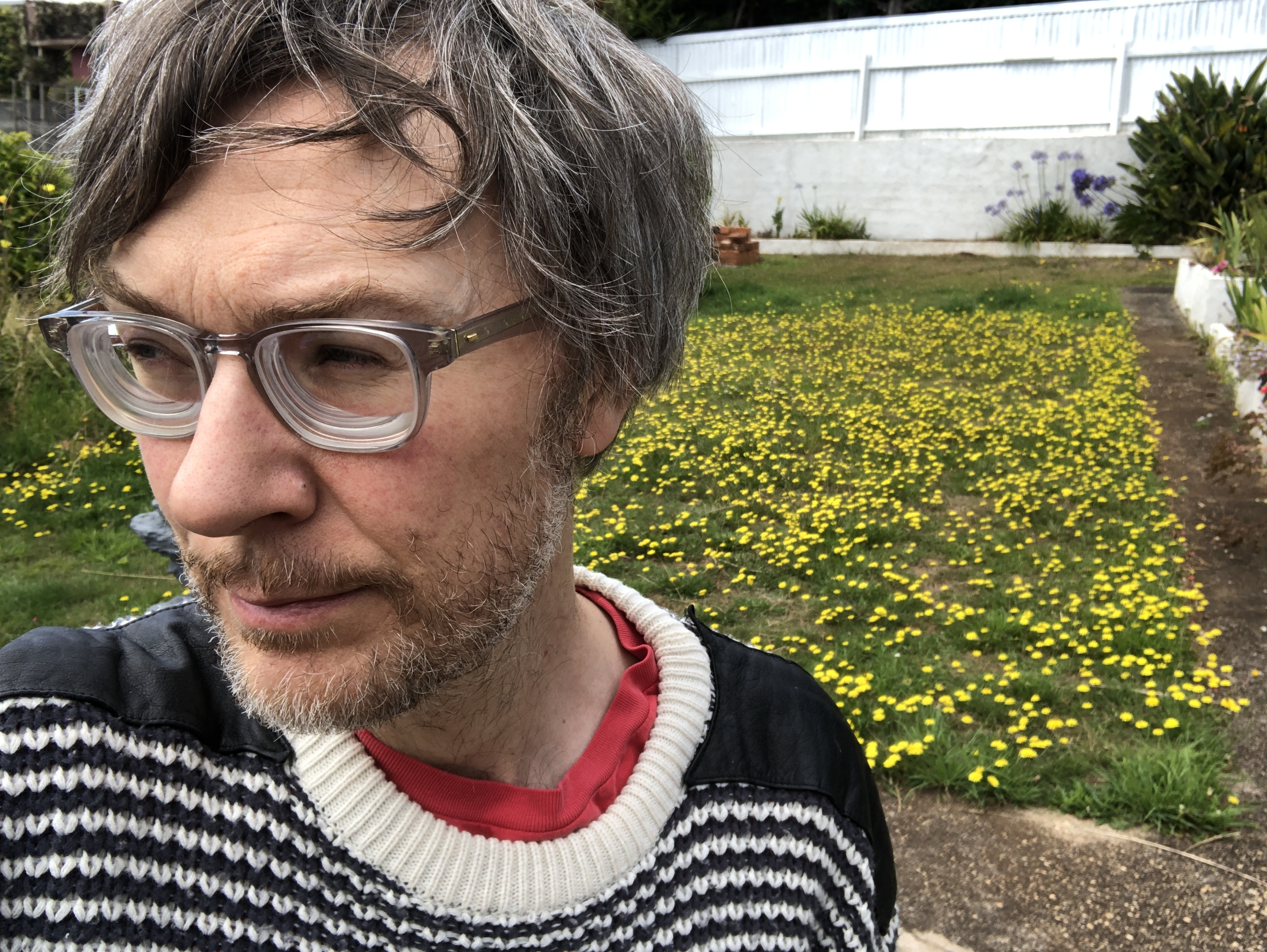
- Heazlewood in Burnie in 2020
- Born: Justin Heazlewood; Burnie, Tasmania, Australia
- Occupations: Writer; singer-songwriter; comedian; journalist; speaker
The Bedroom Philosopher
- Origin: Belconnen, Australian Capital Territory, Australia
- Genres: Musical comedy; folk; acoustic; psychedelic; pop
- Occupation: Musician
- Instruments: Vocals; guitar; accordion
- Years active: 2002–2017
- Labels: Shock; Nan & Pop Records
- Website: justinheazlewood.com

Justin Heazlewood (born 1980), a.k.a. the Bedroom Philosopher, is an Australian author, songwriter and performer. He has released several albums of musical comedy, toured Australia extensively, been nominated for an ARIA Award and published books about his experiences in the entertainment industry.

== Recording career ==
=== 2002–2005 Living on the Edge of My Bed ===
The Bedroom Philosopher began in 2002, Heazlewood submitted a three-minute radio piece for the ABC Heywire competition about his passion for folk music, which led to him becoming a regular guest on Triple J's The Morning Show. He also filmed two pilot episodes of The Bedroom Philosopher Show for ABC's Fly TV. He also secured his first major musical gig, playing support for Bodyjar and The Bumblebeez at Triple J's Unearthed concert later that year.

The Bedroom Philosopher has performed in past years at the Big Day Out, Falls Festival, Melbourne Fringe Festival, Adelaide Fringe Festival, National Folk Festival, Perth International Arts Festival and Melbourne International Comedy Festival. His first three Melbourne Comedy Festival Shows included Living on the Edge of My Bed (2003), In Bed with My Doona (2004), and Pyjamarama (2005). In 2006 he teamed up with Josh Earl to form The Renegades of Folk, performing a Melbourne Comedy Festival show of the same name.

The Bedroom Philosopher's first album, Living on the Edge of My Bed featured tracks which had earlier been played on The Morning Show, and was released in 2003. This collection was only sold at live shows until it was rereleased digitally in 2022.

=== 2005–2008 "I'm So Post Modern" ===
In 2005 the Bedroom Philosopher released his first retail and studio album, In Bed with My Doona, produced by his uncle Ken Heazlewood. This release was taken to strongly by Triple J's audience, with the first single "I'm So Post Modern" becoming a high-rotation hit, reaching number 72 in the Hottest 100. The Bedroom Philosopher was the only unsigned artist to make the list in 2005. His self-produced film clip of "I'm So Post Modern" (by Dan Ilic) also featured on the Hottest 100 DVD.

2007 saw the introduction of 'The Awkwardstra', composed of Andy Hazel on bass and Hugh Rabinovici on drums. Late 2008 saw the addition of Jamie Power on percussion and Gordon Blake on sitar. This coincided with the release of second single "Wow Wow's Song (La La La)" which quickly became a YouTube hit, and featured popular comedy trio Tripod featuring as backing vocalists. This was released as a precursor to his second album Brown and Orange.

=== 2008–2009 Brown and Orange ===
After performing at Perth International Arts Festival The Bedroom Philosopher completed his second album Brown and Orange with producers Chris Scallan and Martin "Moose" Lubran, released in February 2009. The first single from this was "The Happiest Boy", released in October 2007. The video clip of "The Happiest Boy" was made by David Blumenstein at Nakedfella Productions.

The album was promoted with a national tour.

=== 2009–2010 Songs from the 86 Tram ===
April 2009 saw The Bedroom Philosopher debuting his show Songs from the 86 Tram in the Melbourne Comedy Festival. He won the Director's Choice award for outstanding show and reprised it in the 2009 Melbourne Fringe Festival. Songs from this show comprise his third album Songs from the 86 Tram, recorded in August and September 2009. The show was nominated for three 2009 Green Room Awards winning for best cabaret production. The show was revised for a sold-out run at the 2010 Melbourne International Comedy Festival.

Heazlewood appeared as "Re-enactment John" in the ABCTV series John Safran's Race Relations in late 2009.

Songs from the 86 Tram album was presaged by the single "Northcote", released to radio in February 2010. The single peaked at number 12 in the Australian Independent Singles charts and received high rotation on Triple J. The album was released 16 April 2010.

An accompanying Australian national tour to promote the album ran from 12 August until 5 September 2010.

On 28 September 2010 the album was nominated for an ARIA Award for Best Comedy Release.

=== "Northcote (So Hungover)" music video ===
The music video for song "Northcote (So Hungover)" was created by director Craig Melville and produced by David Curry. The video satirises hipster culture which is currently popular in inner-city Melbourne, with humorous stereotypes and pretension thought to be present in neo-hipsterism. The Bedroom Philosopher has since recorded a version of the song composed entirely of comments made on the film clip's YouTube page.

On 23 September 2010 the clip won the Australian Director Guild award in the music video category. On 20 November 2010 it won a silver Australian Cinematographers Society music video award, Best Independent Production Award at the St Kilda Film Festival and Best Music Video Award at the 15 Minutes of Fame Festival in Florida. The filmclip was also voted in Rage's Top 50 film clips of 2010, and the song in the Triple J Hottest 100 in 2011.

=== 2011–2012 Wit Bix ===
2011 saw the release of the songs "Leaving My Hairdresser" and "Tram Inspector", the film clip for the latter charting at 19 in Rage's Top 100 Filmclips of 2011. The Bedroom Philosopher embarked on several solo tours, including opening for The Dresden Dolls on their national tour and performed his show Wit Bix at the Melbourne Comedy Festival. The A Very Beddy Christmas EP was released in November, with a modern adaptation of the Christmas carol "Twelve Days of Christmas" released as a radio single.

== Discography ==
=== Albums ===
List of albums
Title	Album details
Living on the Edge...of My Bed	Released: 2003 (Rereleased 2022); Label: Nan & Pop Records; Formats: CD, download
In Bed with My Doona	Released: 2004; Label: Nan & Pop Records; Formats: CD, download
Brown and Orange	Released: 2009; Label: Nan & Pop Records (NANPOP002); Formats: CD, download
Songs from the 86 Tram	Released: 2010; Label: Nan & Pop Records (NANPOP003); Formats: CD, download
A Very Beddy Christmas	Released: 2011; Label: Nan & Pop Records; Formats: CD, download
Funemployed LP	Released: 2015; Label: Nan & Pop Records (NANPOP006); Formats: CD, download

== Literary career ==
Under his own name, Justin Heazlewood has published four books and written for a number of Australian publications and a television show.

From 2002 until 2012, Heazlewood wrote a fortnightly column for Canberra streetpress BMA called "Struth Be Told". From 2007 until 2011 Heazlewood was a senior writer for Frankie Magazine. Since this time he has contributed to Australian magazines The Big Issue and JMag. His works have also appeared in Australian publications Sleepers Magazine, Rattapallax, Going Down Swinging, The Sex Mook,Mess + Noise and The Death Mook.

From 1999 to 2005, Heazlewood was a regular contributor and editorial committee member for Voiceworks.

From 2005 to 2006, Heazlewood was a full-time writer for the Network Ten sketch comedy program The Ronnie Johns Half Hour.

As The Bedroom Philosopher, Heazlewood published a monthly ezine LapTopping from 2005 to 2012. A regular ezine under his own name entitled Justin Heazlewood's Fuzzy Logic was launched in 2021.

In 2009 Heazlewood created the sketch radio show 'Lime Champions' on Melbourne community radio Triple R. He co-hosted it with Melbourne comedians Damien Lawlor, Josh Earl and Eva Johansen. He left the show in 2010.

In 2012 Heazlewood published his first book The Bedroom Philosopher Diaries. The E-book was published by Affirm, earning praise from Tony Martin, Benjamin Law, Dave Graney and Neil Gaiman.

=== 2014–2015 Funemployed ===
Heazlewood spent 2013 and much of 2014 working on his non-fiction book Funemployed, about the challenges faced by people in the Australian creative industries was published in May 2014. The book was adapted into a radio series broadcast on ABC Radio National and accompanied by an album of the same name. A single "I Don't Know What I'm Doing With My Life" was released under his own name from an EP accompanying the book. The "Funemployed LP" album (later released as The Bedroom Philosopher) features spoken word pieces from interview subjects Brian Ritchie, Tim Rogers and Sam Simmons.

=== 2018–2022 Get Up Mum ===
From 2015 Heazlewood went into hiatus to work on his childhood memoir Get Up Mum. This was a deeply personal work about the experience of growing up as a child carer for a parent with schizophrenia. It is set in his hometown of Burnie, Tasmania and spans one year in his life from 1992 to 1993. To write in the voice of his 12-year-old self he drew from a collection of diaries and cassette recordings made of himself and his family. Get Up Mum was published in May 2018 with launches at Melbourne Writers Festival and Brisbane Writers Festival. In 2019 the book was adapted into a 10-part series for the ABC Radio National program Life Matters. The series was performed entirely by Heazlewood and featured samples of his childhood cassette recordings.

In 2020 Heazlewood was commissioned to produce a live theatrical version of Get Up Mum by Adelaide-based Far and Away Productions. Heazlewood relocated to his hometown Burnie for an extended period and received several grants from Arts Tasmania. The new work premiered at the Theatre Royal, Hobart in March 2022.

In 2020 Heazlewood gave a witness statement for the Royal Commission into Victoria’s Mental Health System. Since 2018 he has been an ambassador for Satellite Foundation who support young people caring for a family member with a mental illness.

=== 2023-2025 Dream Burnie ===
During the pandemic, Heazlewood moved back to his hometown of Burnie. He became involved with the Burnie Arts Council who were celebrating their 75th anniversary. Heazlewood collaborated with them on a book project honouring twenty prominent artistic alumni from the area. The resulting publication Dream Burnie is an exhaustive memoir, art book and cultural time capsule featuring advertisements and tales from the 1980s and 1990s sourced from newspaper's his Mum had kept.

A limited edition of 750 copies were printed. These were hand-embellished with stickers and individually numbered. Dream Burnie was released on February 3, 2025. Heazlewood and the Burnie Arts Council embarked on a Tasmanian and East Coast tour to promote it, featuring a pop-up art exhibition displaying work from artists featured in the book. It received praise from Myf Warhurst and Wally De Backer and included an interview with Peter Garrett explaining Midnight Oil's 1981 song called 'Burnie.'

== World records ==
- Longest continuous performance of Daryl Braithwaite's "The Horses" while riding on a horse carousel on Melbourne Cup day in Canberra – (30 minutes).
- Longest continuous performance of John Farnham's "You're The Voice" in Melbourne – (9 hours).
- Longest demonstration of 'BoonRapping' (reading David Boon's autobiography in a hip hop style) in Hobart – (12.5 minutes).
- Artist with the most performances at the venue 'Stage Door: The Cafe' in Burnie, Tasmania.

== Awards and nominations ==
=== ARIA Music Awards ===
The ARIA Music Awards are a set of annual ceremonies presented by Australian Recording Industry Association (ARIA), which recognise excellence, innovation, and achievement across all genres of the music of Australia. They commenced in 1987.

Year	Nominee / work	Award	Result	Ref.
2010	Songs from the 86 Tram (as The Bedroom Philosopher)	Best Comedy Release	Nominated	

=== Melbourne International Comedy Festival ===
The Melbourne International Comedy Festival is the largest stand-alone comedy festival and the second-largest international comedy festival in the world. They commenced in 1987.

Year	Nominee / work	Award	Result	Ref.
2009	Songs from the 86 Tram (as The Bedroom Philosopher)	Director's Choice Award	Won	

=== Green Room Awards ===
Year	Nominee / work	Award	Result	Ref.
2009	Songs from the 86 Tram (as The Bedroom Philosopher)	Best Cabaret Production	Won	
