= List of The Dukes of Broxstonia episodes =

The Dukes of Broxstonia is an Australian animated series which aired over 3 seasons.

== Series overview ==
The Dukes of Broxstonia series overview
Season	Episodes	Originally aired		DVD release date		
Season	Episodes	Season premiere	Season finale	Region 1	Region 2	Region 4
1	10	2 August 2010	2 January 2011	TBA		
2	10	10 January 2011	23 January 2012	TBA		
3	10	15 April 2013	26 April 2013	TBA		

== Episode list ==
=== Season 1 (2010–11) ===
The Dukes of Broxstonia season 1 episodes
No. overall	No. in season	Title	Original release date	Prod. code
1	1	"Ear Ache"	2 August 2010	101
2	2	"Itchier & Scratchier"	3 August 2010	102
3	3	"Fan Belt"	4 August 2010	103
4	4	"Pants Orf"	5 August 2010	104
5	5	"Pizza Fight"	6 August 2010	105
6	6	"Pot Luck"	9 August 2010	106
7	7	"Desert Duel"	10 August 2010	107
8	8	"Moon Tour"	11 August 2010	108
9	9	"Wash Day"	29 November 2010	109
10	10	"On TV"	2 January 2011	110

=== Season 2 (2011–12) ===
The Dukes of Broxstonia season 2 episodes
No. overall	No. in season	Title	Original release date	Prod. code
11	1	"Bite Night"	10 January 2011	201
12	2	"Axe Affair"	2 June 2011	202
13	3	"Photoshoot"	1 September 2011	208
14	4	"Tomatoes"	30 October 2011	207
15	5	"Planet Of Babies"	19 December 2011	205
16	6	"Robot Bouncer"	26 December 2011	206
17	7	"Back to Bröxstônia"	2 January 2012	204
18	8	"Strong Arj"	9 January 2012	203
19	9	"Trophy"	16 January 2012	209
20	10	"Larj in Love"	23 January 2012	210

=== Season 3 (2013) ===
The Dukes of Broxstonia season 3 episodes
No. overall	No. in season	Title	Original release date	Prod. code
21	1	"Fly"	15 April 2013	301
22	2	"Arj-o-phone"	16 April 2013	302
23	3	"Undies"	17 April 2013	303
24	4	"Game"	18 April 2013	304
25	5	"Skinny"	19 April 2013	305
26	6	"Robobarj"	22 April 2013	306
27	7	"Mojo"	23 April 2013	307
28	8	"Wanted"	24 April 2013	308
29	9	"Royal Dukes"	25 April 2013	309
30	10	"Dukes In Space"	26 April 2013	310
