= John Safran's Race Relations =

Australian TV series

- Created by: John Safran
- Directed by: Craig Melville, Lynn-Maree Milburn
- Presented by: John Safran
- Composer: Peter Isaac
- Country of origin: Australia
- Original language: English
- No. of seasons: 1
- No. of episodes: 8

Production
- Executive producers: Laura Waters, Debbie Lee
- Producers: John Safran, Laura Waters, John Molloy, Craig Melville, Roland Kapferer

Original release
- Network: ABC1
- Release: 21 October 2009 – December 2009

John Safran's Race Relations is an Australian comedy documentary television series by John Safran broadcast on ABC1 in 2009. The eight-part series is about cross-cultural, interracial and interfaith love. His globetrotting takes him to the Philippines, Togo, Japan, Thailand, UK, Israel and Palestine, Netherlands, the United States.

== Episodes ==
=== Episode 1 ===
Episode 1 saw Safran travelling to Israel where his Palestinian boom mic operator made a donation to a sperm bank, then to the West Bank where a donation to a clinic was made by John, in an attempt to make half Jewish half Palestinian children – a "Jalestinian"

Noting that he has dated three Eurasian women, Safran conducts an experiment by stealing and smelling the underwear of five Jewish and five Eurasian women (including Nicole Scherzinger of the Pussycat Dolls and actress Dichen Lachman) to see which he "prefers".

=== Episode 2 ===
Inspired by the 1961 book Black Like Me, Safran travels the streets of Chicago after undergoing makeup that makes him appear black. He interviews some militants, preaches at a predominantly black church and confronts people for using the N word.

=== Episode 3 ===
After ex-Muslim purported former terrorist Walid Shoebat tells Safran that his hatred of Jews was quashed after watching Fiddler on the Roof 300 times, Safran heads to the Palestinian territories, where he attempts to "de-brainwash" representatives of Fatah and Hamas by performing "If I Were a Rich Man" for them. Satisfied with their positive response, Safran performs the song on a Palestinian Broadcasting Corporation talk show.

Safran attempts to rid himself of Jewish guilt about inter-racial relationships by flying a shiksa (non-Jewish woman) to Amsterdam, where he asks her to make out with him in Anne Frank's attic. He then travels to America, where Wayne Griffiths of NORM (the National Organization for Restoring Men) helps him to reverse his circumcision.

=== Episode 4 ===
Safran travels to Togo for a voodoo death, and later confronts his ex-girlfriend he remains obsessed with.

=== Episode 5 ===
Safran dons an Elephant Man disguise to try to discover whether he is attractive to Asian women, confronts his father about being a self-hating Jew, and takes matters into his own hands in a showdown with Holocaust-denier David Irving. Safran arranged for the interview to take place in a radio studio that had been altered to resemble a gas chamber. During the interview, he left the room, blocked the door and opened a gas cylinder, telling Irving that the room was filling with gas and that he would deny the incident if Irving reported it. Irving appeared amused by the prank. The segment received a mixed response:academic Dvir Abramovich criticised it as an insensitive use of Holocaust imagery, while writer Julie Szego defended it as satire that exposed Irving's racist views.

=== Episode 6 ===
With the help of his two best friends, Safran digs a hole next to his mother's grave and performs a Kabbalah ritual in order to ask her if she wishes for him to marry a Jewish girl. Unsatisfied with the response, he travels to Japan to take advantage of a service that allows patrons to hire people to be their relatives. He pours out his feelings to his "mother" who tells him that she believes real love and a connection are more important than race or religion.

=== Episode 7 ===
Safran explores Christian domestic discipline, the philosophy of Star Trek as a religion replacement, and goes on a date as a Thai lady boy to help get over his Eurasian ex-girlfriend.

=== Episode 8 ===
Safran attempts to prove ethnic identity is simply a social construct by undergoing a fake wedding ceremony to a Muslim (and relation of Osama bin Laden) woman pretending to be Jewish and make a break from past and enter the world of post-race by subjecting himself to devotional crucifixion in the Philippines.

== See also ==
- John Safran vs God
- John Safran's Music Jamboree
- List of Australian television series
