= Lawrence Leung's Choose Your Own Adventure =

2009 Australian comedy TV series

- Genre: Comedy
- Directed by: Craig Melville, Nathan Earl
- Starring: Lawrence Leung
- Composer: Peter Isaac
- Country of origin: Australia
- Original language: English
- No. of seasons: 1
- No. of episodes: 6

Production
- Executive producers: Martin Robertson and Julian Morrow (for Chaser Broadcasting); Megan Harding (for ABC TV)
- Producers: Andy Nehl, Nathan Earl, Craig Melville
- Running time: 26 minutes

Original release
- Network: ABC1
- Release: 25 March – 29 April 2009

Lawrence Leung's Choose Your Own Adventure is a six-part Australian television comedy series, starring and primarily written by Melbourne comedian Lawrence Leung and produced by Chaser Broadcasting. The series was filmed over nine weeks from May 2008 in Sydney, Melbourne and Los Angeles, it depicts Leung setting out to achieve the dreams he had as a ten-year-old boy living in the 1980s. It premiered at 9:30 pm on 25 March 2009 on ABC1. The series aired in syndication in the United States under the title The Lost Adventures of Lawrence Leung on Vibrant TV Network.

== Overview ==
Lawrence Leung's Choose Your Own Adventure is described as "an imaginative documentary/comedy/adventure series where the innocence of childhood ambition clashes with the realities of adulthood, resulting in unexpected consequences that are hair-raising, heart-warming and hilarious. It's about finding out who we are, how we've changed and what we can be."

In each episode Leung attempts to revisit aspects and ambitions of his childhood life. In the first episode, Lawrence sets out to find and impress his childhood sweetheart Angela, whom he has not seen since leaving the primary school she attended. Other ambitions include Lawrence finding out how to be a rock star, how to be a man, how to be cool, how to be the best in the world and how to be himself. In each episode, he meets with an expert in each field and seeks their advice, as well as that of his parents Doris and Leo. Guest stars Lawrence meets during the course of the series include Tiffany, Ian Dickson, Margaret Pomeranz, David Stratton, Kerry O'Brien, Tim Rogers and Shabba Doo.

The show's website also features additional content in the form of games, clips, competitions, wallpaper and expert tips and tricks. After each broadcast viewers will also be able to watch previously aired episodes. The episodes are only viewable for residents of Australia.

On 7 May 2009, the two-disc complete series DVD of Lawrence Leung's Choose Your Own Adventure was released. Extras include deleted scenes, music videos and a 57 min tutorial taught by Lawrence Leung entitled "How To Solve The Rubik's Cube".

== Episodes ==
#	Title	Airdate	Timeslot	Ratings (Note: Overall national viewers, numbers in brackets indicate nightly ratings position.)
Series 1 (2009)
1	"Find Love"	25 March 2009	Wednesday 9:30 pm – 10:00 pm	674,000 (23rd)
2	"Be a Rock Star"	1 April 2009	Wednesday 9:30 pm – 10:00 pm	490,000 (27th)
3	"Be a Man"	8 April 2009	Wednesday 9:30 pm – 10:00 pm	551,000 (28th)
4	"Be the Best in the World"	15 April 2009	Wednesday 9:30 pm – 10:00 pm	700,000 (25th)
5	"Be Cool"	22 April 2009	Wednesday 9:30 pm – 10:00 pm	602,000 (29th)
6	"Be Myself"	29 April 2009	Wednesday 9:30 pm – 10:00 pm	666,000 (28th)
Average series ratings				613,833

== See also ==
- Lawrence Leung
