= The Dukes of Broxstonia season 2 =

The Dukes of Broxstonia
- Season 2
- No. of episodes: 10

Release
- Original network: ABC3
- Original release: 10 January 2011 – 23 January 2012

Season chronology
- ← Previous; Season 1 Next → Season 3

The second season of Animated series The Dukes Of Broxstonia first broadcast on ABC3 Australia on 10 January 2011 and ended on 23 January 2012. It contains 10 episodes available as 3 minutes episodes in 1080i HD format. The season began with "Bite Night" and ended with "Larj In Love".

== Episode list ==
The Dukes of Broxstonia season 2 episodes
No. overall	No. in season	Title	Original release date	Prod. code
11	1	"Bite Night"	10 January 2011	201
The Dukes stay over in a spooky looking hotel.
12	2	"Axe Affair"	2 June 2011	202
Larj is fed up with his old guitar and kicks it out. He takes up with a keytar (a keyboard guitar) instead.
13	3	"Photoshoot"	1 September 2011	208
The Dukes are having photos taken for their new album cover.
14	4	"Tomatoes"	30 October 2011	207
The Dukes stop by a hamburger store where Barj tries tomato sauce (ketchup) for the first time.
15	5	"Planet Of Babies"	19 December 2011	205
The Dukes are zapped by a magical rattle to a planet ruled by a giant baby.
16	6	"Robot Bouncer"	26 December 2011	206
The Dukes are in a rush to get to a concert. Barj is busting to go to the toilet - but Arj refuses to stop.
17	7	"Back to Bröxstônia"	2 January 2012	204
The Dukes are summoned back to Bröxstônia to play at the President’s daughters birthday party.
18	8	"Strong Arj"	9 January 2012	203
The Dukes are playing at an outdoor music festival with rides and stalls.
19	9	"Trophy"	16 January 2012	209
The Dukes and their rivals the Lukes of Flökstônia are up against each other for ‘Best Band Hair’ at a music award show.
20	10	"Larj in Love"	23 January 2012	210
The Dukes do a sound check at a gig near a cemetery.
