= Andrew McClelland =

Australian comedian and writer

Andrew McClelland is an Australian comedian, writer and DJ from Melbourne, Victoria.

== Comedian ==
McClelland has performed hour-long comedy shows around Australia, New Zealand and at the Edinburgh Fringe Festival since 2003. His past shows have included Tie Her To The Tracks (2012 Moosehead recipient), Andrew McClelland’s One Man Stand (2012 Crikey's 'Best of the Fest' award), and Andrew McClelland's Somewhat Accurate History of Pirates (1550-2017) (2004 Piece of Wood Award). He is a frequent collaborator of comedian Lawrence Leung.

=== Comedy Awards ===
Melbourne International Comedy Festival 'Piece of Wood' (Comedian's Choice) Award.

Sydney Comedy Festival Judges Panel Award.

Melbourne International Comedy Festival Moosehead Award.

Crikey 'Best of the Fest' Award.

=== Shows ===
2004 A Somewhat Accurate History of Pirates

2005 The Somewhat Secret Secret Society Show (with Lawrence Leung)

2006 Andrew McClelland's Mix Tape

2007 Andrew McClelland's Somewhat Ambitious Solution for Making the World a Better Place

2008 Andrew McClelland's Guide to Being a Modern Gentleman

2009 Time Ninjas (with Lawrence Leung)

2010 Andrew McClelland's Somewhat Accurate History of the Fall of the Roman Empire

2011 Truth be Told

2012 One Man Stand

2012 Tie Her to the Tracks

2013 Hang the DJ

2015 Overdressed and Underwhelmed

2016 We Really Must do this Again Sometime

2018 Andrew McClelland's seated Walking Tour of Western Europe

== Television ==
McClelland has had numerous television appearances including Spicks and Specks (ABC), In Siberia Tonight (SBS), Stand Up Australia (The Comedy Channel), AD/BC (SBS), The Chaser's War on Everything (ABC1), The Circle (Channel 10), Slide Show (Channel 7), Tonightly with Tom Ballard (ABC), Comedy Up Late (ABC), and providing all main character voices for The Dukes of Broxtonia (ABC3).

== DJing ==
Andrew has DJd since 2003 and has been head DJ at Mr McClelland's Finishing School since 2008 and sometimes performs a children's DJing show 'Mr McClelland's Starting School.'

He was also the only support act for Cher's 2018 Australia/New Zealand tour and Robbie Williams support for a secret gig in Melbourne in 2022.

Andrew currently DJs parties and functions around Australia and internationally.
