= Songs from the 86 Tram =

Studio album by The Bedroom Philosopher
- Released: 16 April 2010 (Australia)
- Recorded: The Soft Centre, Melbourne; October–December 2009
- Genres: Musical comedy, folk pop, indie rock
- Length: 49:54
- Label: Shock
- Producer: Chris Scallan

The Bedroom Philosopher chronology
Brown and Orange (2009)	Songs from the 86 Tram (2010)

Singles from Songs from the 86 Tram
- 1. "Northcote (so Hungover)" Released: 21 January 2010

Songs from the 86 Tram is the third full-length album by the ARIA nominated Australian musical comedian The Bedroom Philosopher, the performing persona of Justin Heazlewood. It is the soundtrack to his award-winning live comedy show. The album marks his first release on an established record label, Shock Records, and the first recording with his backing band, The Awkwardstra.

== Themes ==
The album is notable for its theme; narrating the lives of passengers on board a Melbourne tram, navigating the Route 86, from Bundoora to Docklands via Northcote, Collingwood and through the Melbourne CBD.

Heazlewood describes the album as an exercise in character exploration: In comedy, bogans get made fun of all the time, and old people and junkies are all easy targets. I was interested in taking on demographics that are rarely satirised in any way.

Noting a lack of art, new media or otherwise, exploring modern Australian identity or actively countering international cultural influence, Heazlewood notes the importance of Songs from the 86 Tram as attempting to fill an underrepresented "non-bogan Australian pride": "From growing up with Sesame Street right through to any comedy on TV being British or American, I feel like we’re really up against it to forge any kind of uniquely Australian culture. And then we’ve got our own cultural cringe. We’re not that proud of ourselves. The line [on "Sudanese"] that Australia is basically just America with Milo and possums... at times that's how I feel. It's just a bunch of American shops and TV and music, so what are you left with?"

== Reception ==
Reviews for the album were wholly positive with several noting his song "Northcote (So Hungover)" as exemplifying the first example of an emerging "new Australian-American accent".

== Track listing ==
All lyrics and music written by The Bedroom Philosopher, arrangements by Hugh Rabinovici and Chris Scallan, and played by The Bedroom Philosopher and his Awkwardstra:

1. "Middle Aged Mum" – 4:20
2. "We are Tramily" – 4:01
3. "Sudanese" – 2:33
4. "Trishine" - 2:14
5. "Interlewd" – 0:32
6. "Northcote (So Hungover)" – 3:44
7. "Irish Girl" – 3:04
8. "Tram Inspector" – 3:30
9. "Man on a Tram" – 1:12
10. "Song to Nod Off To" – 4:23
11. "In My Day (Nan)" – 2:37
12. "New Media" – 4:13
13. "Old Man at End" – 5:01

== Personnel ==
- Justin Heazlewood - vocals, guitar, accordion
- Hugh Rabinovici - drums, backing vocals
- Gordon Blake - guitar, sitar, backing vocals
- Jamie Power - percussion, backing vocals
- Andy Hazel - bass guitar, backing vocals
- Harry Angus - trumpet
- Scott Griffiths - piano, harp, synths, percussion
- Jessica Venables - cello
- Willow Stahlut - violin, viola
- Xani Colac - violin
- David Rabinovici - violin
- DJ Who - scratching
- Nicole Shenko - backing vocals
