= Lawrence Leung =

Australian comedian

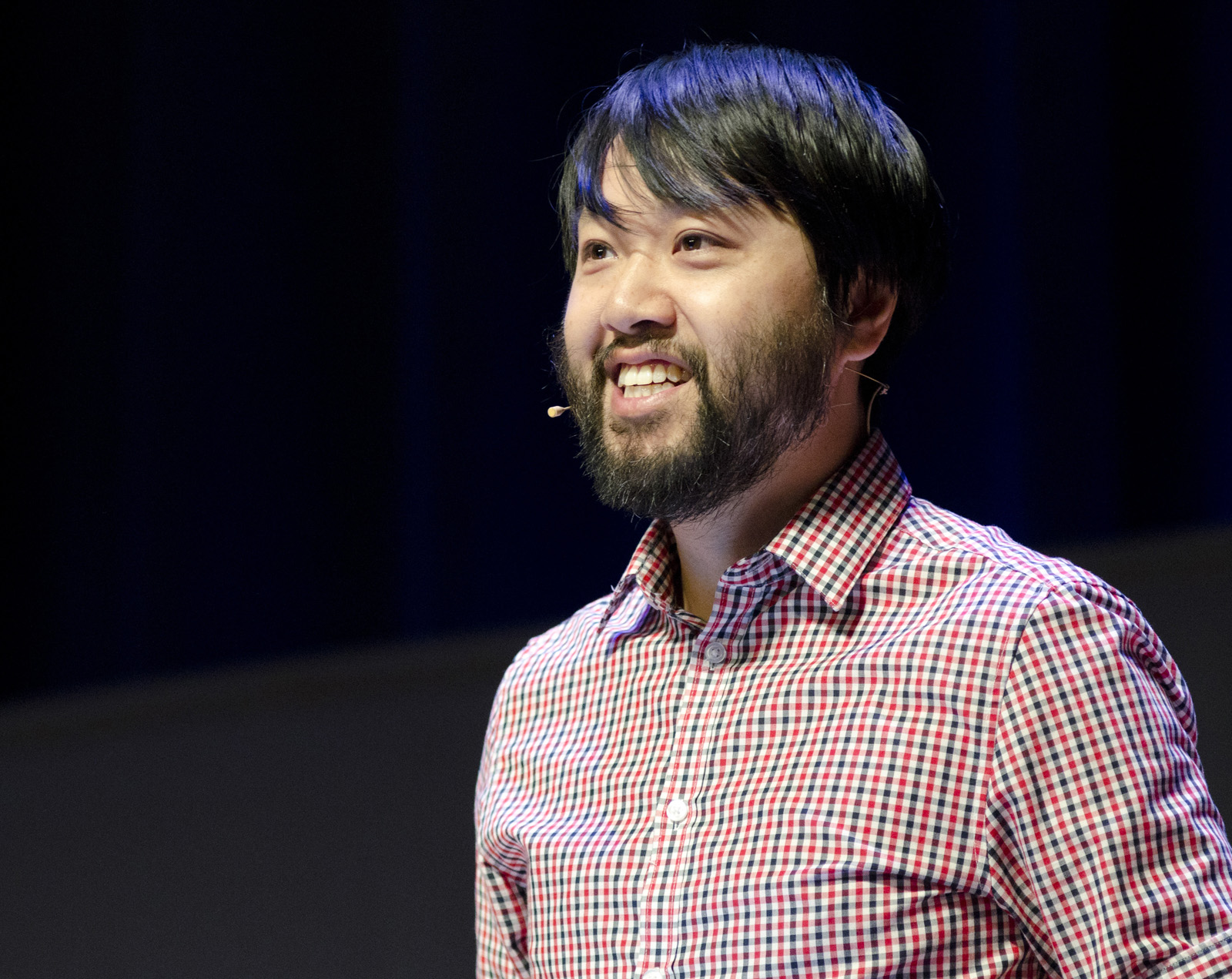
- Leung speaking at the Australian Skeptics National Convention 2017
- Born: Melbourne, Australia
- Education: University of Melbourne
- Occupations: Comedian, writer, director, actor
- Known for: Maximum Choppage; Lawrence Leung's Choose Your Own Adventure; Lawrence Leung's Unbelievable
- Website: lawrenceleung.com

Lawrence Leung is an Australian comedian, writer, director and actor from Melbourne. He is best known for his television series Lawrence Leung's Choose Your Own Adventure based his one-man shows on stories about his obsessions, such as breakdancing, ghosts, the Rubik's Cube, and his family.

== Career ==
=== Comedian and writer ===
Leung has performed in shows in London's West End and at the Edinburgh Fringe festival, as well as having toured Australia extensively. In 2001, his show Sucker won Best Solo Show at the Melbourne Fringe Festival, and in 2007, his show Lawrence Leung Learns to Breakdance won the Age Critic's Award for best Australian show at the Melbourne International Comedy Festival and the Best Local (Australian) Show at the 2008 Sydney Comedy Festival. His other shows included Skeptic, The Marvellous Misadventures of Puzzle Boy and Lawrence Leung Wants A Jetpack. He has also written pranks for the satirical comedy TV show The Chaser's War on Everything.

Leung has performed frequently with Andrew McClelland; the pair have been friends since school and started in comedy together in an improvised comedy group called the Improbables, which also featured other young Melbourne comedians including Nick Caddaye (from sketch troupe Anarchist Guild Social Committee), Adam McKenzie (from comedy trio The Hounds) and UK-based comic Yianni Agisilaou. Their collaborations include The Paradoxical Adventures of Lawrence Leung and Andrew McClelland: Time Ninjas in 2009, which both parodied their usual comedy styles and explored their youth together. Time Ninjas won the Jury Award at the 2009 Sydney Comedy Festival.

=== Television and radio ===
Leung was the writer and star of Lawrence Leung's Choose Your Own Adventure, which aired on ABC1 and ABC2 in 2009. The show revolves around Leung attempting to re-live childhood ambitions and is described as "an imaginative documentary/comedy/adventure series where the innocence of childhood ambition clashes with the realities of adulthood, resulting in unexpected consequences that are hair-raising, heart-warming and hilarious." In April 2009, he released a soundtrack EP from the show called Choose Your Own Adventure: Music from the ABC TV Series, consisting of six tracks, mostly from the "Be a Rock Star" and "Find Love" episodes. The 2-disc complete series DVD of Lawrence Leung's Choose Your Own Adventure was released on 7 May 2009. Extras include deleted scenes, music videos and a 57min tutorial taught by Leung entitled "How To Solve The Rubik's Cube".

Leung returned to ABC1 in 2011 with a new six-part documentary series titled Lawrence Leung's Unbelievable which investigated supernatural phenomena such as aliens, psychic powers, magic, and ghosts – and why some people feel the need to believe in these things.

Maximum Choppage is an Australian television comedy series starring Lawrence Leung. The six-part series premiered in 2015 on ABC2. It is directed by Craig Melville and written by Leung, Duncan Sarkies and Josh Mapleston. It is produced by Julie Eckersley, Sophie Miller and Linda Micsko with executive producers Tony Ayres and Debbie Lee. The series is based on the film work of Timothy Ly which was developed into the TV series by Matchbox Pictures. Lawrence Leung stars as Simon Chan who has returned to his hometown of Cabramatta. Whilst everyone thinks he was studying at a legendary martial arts school in Beijing, the truth is he was at Marshall's Art School, in Melbourne. Skilful with a paintbrush but clueless in combat, Simon is the exact opposite of an action hero. However, due to his mother's boasting, everyone in Cabramatta thinks he is a kung fu master and the new saviour of their town.

Leung has been a regular guest on breakfast radio (3RRR Breakfasters) and appeared on Tony Martin & Ed Kavalee's Get This (3MMM) and Loose Ends (BBC).

Leung performed a guest stand-up set on RMITV's The Loft Live Episode 12 of Season 8 13 April 2000 broadcast on Channel 31 Melbourne.

He also co-hosted the Sunday morning breakfast show on Melbourne's Fox FM in 2005 and 2006 with Courteney Hocking and Andrew McClelland.

Leung wrote and presented regular off-beat mini-documentaries for Steve "The Sandman" Abbott's variety show In Siberia Tonight (SBS TV, 2004).

He was a writer of pranks for two seasons of ABC TV's The Chaser's War On Everything and has appeared on a variety of television shows including The Today Show (Nine Network), Stand Up Australia (The Comedy Channel), The Edinburgh Show (BBC2), Open House (RTÉ).

On 4 April 2009, Leung was guest programmer on ABC1's popular and long running overnight music video show Rage.

On 26 May 2009, Leung appeared as a guest on Australian game show Talkin' 'Bout Your Generation.

On 7 April 2013 Leung appeared on Australian television series Offspring as Dr. Elvis Kwan.

In 2017, Leung recorded Episode 1 of Series 2 of ABC Kids Play School Story Time, reading Lynley Dodd's "Hairy Maclary and Zachary Quack".

== Recognition and awards ==
Lawrence Leung's Choose Your Own Adventure was nominated for a 2009 AFI Award in the category of Best Television Comedy.

Leung has a Star Wars character named after him (Lar Le'ung, a Jedi Master) in the 2009 Star Wars comic book series Star Wars: Invasion, written by Tom Taylor and illustrated by Colin Wilson.

He won GQ Australia's Man of the Year 2009, in the category of Comedic Talent of the Year.

== Filmography ==
=== Film ===
Year	Title	Role	Notes
2003	The Long Lunch	Ingnatius	
2005	Webster Say	Mam with Dog	Short film
2006	I Could Be Anybody	Felix	Short film
2013	Zero to Hero	Hero	Short film
2013	Nerds in Love	Emilio	Short film
2015	Sucker	The Real Lawrence Leung	
2017	Mother, Child	Alex	Short film

=== Television ===
Year	Title	Role	Notes
2012	House Husbands	Jasper	2 episodes
2013–17	Offspring	Dr. Elvis Kwan	32 episodes
2015	Maximum Choppage	Simon Chan	6 episodes
2017	Newton's Law	Dr. Jarrod Renfree	Episode: "The Uncertainty Principle"
2017	Top of the Lake	Nate	2 episodes
2017	St Francis	Dr. Elvis Kwan	Episode: "Webisode 4"
2018; 2021	Why Are You Like This	Daniel	3 episodes
2019	My Life Is Murder	Ken	Episode: "Mirror Mirror"
