= Yeshivah College, Australia =

Chabad school in Victoria, Australia

Yeshivah College
- Hebrew: ישיבה אהלי יוסף יצחק ליובאוויטש, romanized: Yeshivas Oholei Yosef Yitzchok Lubavitch

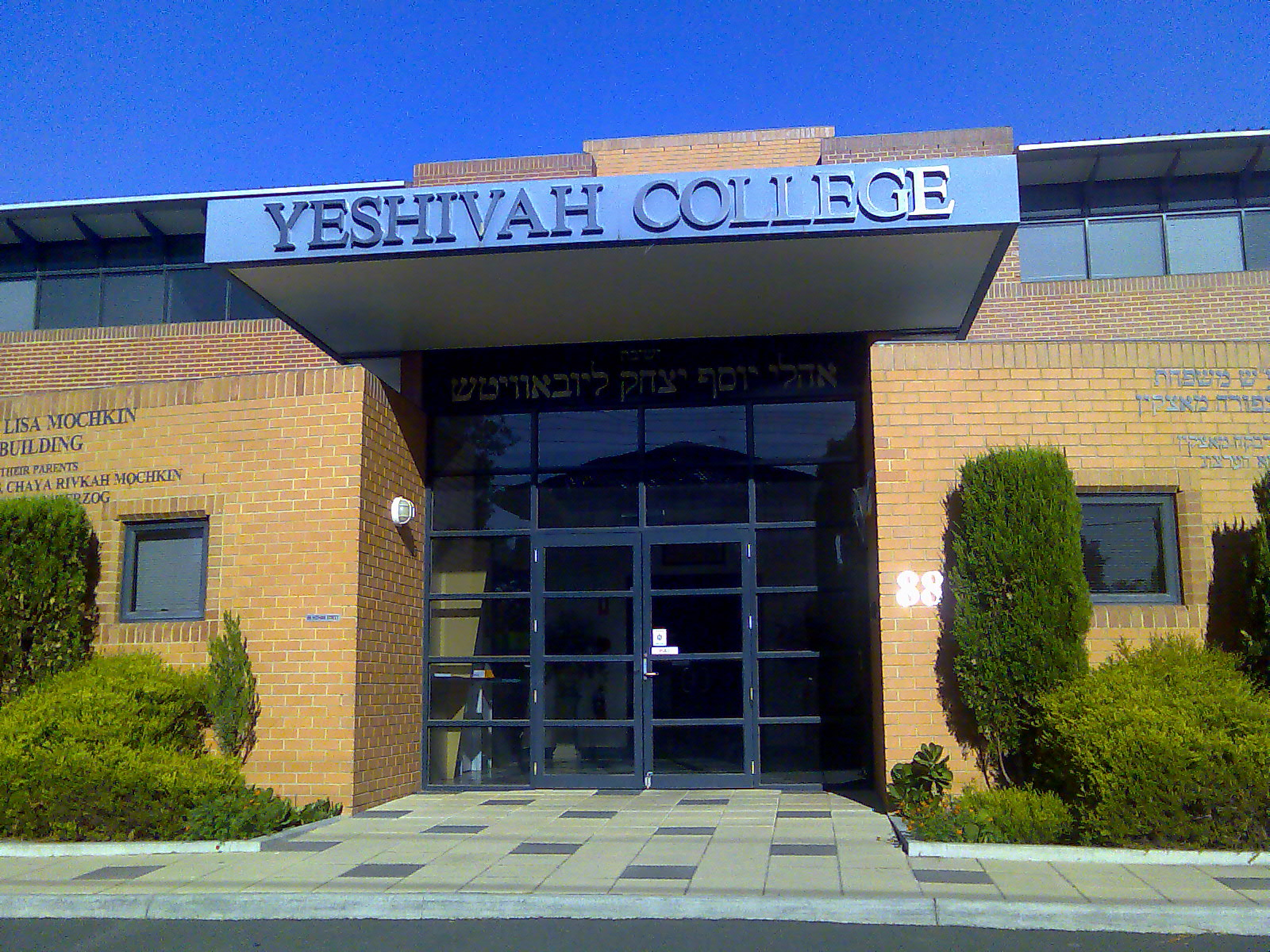
- The Mochkin Building, which serves as the entrance to the Yeshivah primary school

Location
- East St Kilda, Victoria; Australia; 37°52′07″S 145°00′00″E

Information
- Type: Independent comprehensive single-sex primary and secondary Jewish day school
- Religious affiliation: Jewish
- Denomination: Orthodoxy; Chabad-Lubavitch
- Established: 1955; 71 years ago
- Principal: Rabbi Elisha Greenbaum
- Key people: The Lubavitcher Rebbe; Rabbi Y. D. Groner, OBD; Rabbi Mendel Lipskier
- Years: K–12
- Gender: Boys
- Enrolment: 420 (2019)
- Colours: Navy blue and gold
- Slogan: Educating for life
- Website: ybr.vic.edu.au

Yeshivah College, officially Yeshivas Oholei Yosef Yitzchok Lubavitch (Hebrew: ישיבה אהלי יוסף יצחק ליובאוויטש), is an independent Orthodox Jewish comprehensive single-sex primary and secondary Jewish day school for boys, located in the Melbourne suburb of St Kilda East, in Victoria, Australia.

The school is run by the Chabad-Lubavitch movement's Yeshivah Centre, and caters to students from kindergarten through to Year 12.

== History ==
The previous Lubavitcher Rebbe sent five Chabad families to establish a community in Australia. They originally moved to Shepparton as there was already a Chabad family there. In the 1950s they moved to Melbourne and started the school in 1958. Rabbi Yitzchak Dovid Groner was sent from New York to help in the school and not long after his arrival he became the principal and director of the school.

Yeshivah College now thrives on the same campus as Yeshivah Shule, the community's synagogue.

In 2017, the school had the distinction of having the Chief Rabbi of Israel come and address students. Rabbi David Lau was visiting Melbourne on his Australia tour.

== Administration ==
The school is part of a worldwide network of the umbrella, and Rabbi Mordechai Berger was the principal of the high school, having replaced Rabbi Avrohom Glick at the start of the 2008 school year, however, Rabbi Glick stepped in as Interim Menahel when Rabbi Berger left at the end of the 2009 school year. Rabbi Glick ended his term as Interim Menahel at the end of term two, being succeeded by Rabbi Yehoshua Smukler from Sydney, Australia who finished in 2019 and then moved to Moriah College, Sydney. Following his exit, Dr Shimon Waronker took the position however due to issues relating to COVID-19, he was unable to continue as principal. After his departure, Mrs. Barbara Belfer took the position as interim principal over Yeshivah and Beth Rivkah Colleges. The current Principal of Yeshivah-Beth Rivkah Colleges is Rabbi Elisha Greenbaum.

== Curriculum ==
For students in Year 10 and upwards, Yeshivah College has two educational tracks. One is a dual curriculum including both religious studies and general education studies. The other is a religious studies-only curriculum known as 'Mesivta Melbourne' (Hebrew for "academy").

The Mesivta program consists of Chassidus, Talmud, Shulchan Aruch, and many other Jewish texts and subjects. Every month the students get together for a "farbrengen" a gathering in which stories and words of inspiration are shared by students, teachers, and guest speakers. The students regularly publish a kovetz (compilation of talmudic novelties). Overall the Mesivta students provide a sense of Jewishness to the school.

== Shluchim ==
Every year a group of shluchim (emissaries) are sent to assist the teachers and mashpias of the school in setting an example for today's students. They do so by instituting mivtzos - programs that encourage the practice of Chassidic life. In most years, the shluchim are sent from Ohlei Torah Rabbinical College in America.

Over the years the number of Shluchim to the school has varied between five and six for a one-year stay, although during the COVID-19 pandemic they stayed for 2 years.

== In the community ==
Yeshivah scores top VCE results for a non-selective boys-only school.

The Yeshivah College is part of a larger network of facilities of the Yeshivah Centre, which includes a youth movement, Jewish studies classes, day camps, and many other initiatives for Melbourne's wider Jewish community.

The Melbourne Lubavitch community is part of a larger Haredi community based in Melbourne.

== Controversies ==
While the college received criticism for its handling of reported child abuse in the 1990s, it has also been lauded for its efforts to reach out to victims and for the strength of its child protection policies at the present. In 2015, Yeshivah established a groundbreaking redress scheme for victims years before any other Jewish school and predating the National Redress Scheme.

The college was investigated by the Australian Royal Commission into Institutional Responses to Child Sexual Abuse, for alleged abuses that occurred during the tenure of Rabbi Avrohom Glick, where Glick served as Principal in the 1980s and 1990s. In 2015, Glick resigned from all posts at Yeshivah College. He also tendered his resignation from the spiritual committee of the Yeshivah Centre.

== Notable alumni ==
- Rabbi Yaakov Glasman
- Rabbi Mordechai Gutnick
- Rabbi Moshe Gutnick
- Joseph Gutnick – mining magnate
- John Safran – award-winning comedian
- David Solomon – noted international Jewish historian and author
- Manny Waks – founder of the sexual abuse victims' advocate group, Tzedek. Featured in the documentary film that covers allegations of child sex abuse at Yeshivah College.

== See also ==
- List of non-government schools in Victoria
- Hasidic Judaism
- Judaism in Australia
