= The Dukes of Broxstonia =

- Genre: Comedy; Innuendo; Slapstick
- Created by: Suren Perera; Stu Connolly
- Written by: Stu Connolly
- Directed by: Suren Perera, Stu Connolly
- Voices of: Andrew McClelland
- Composer: Scott Collins
- Country of origin: Australia
- No. of seasons: 3
- No. of episodes: 30 (list of episodes)

Production
- Executive producer: Donna Andrews
- Producer: Stu Connolly
- Running time: 50 seconds (season 1); 3 minutes (season 2); 7 minutes (season 3)
- Production company: Sticky Pictures

Original release
- Network: ABC3
- Release: 2 August 2010 – 26 April 2013

The Dukes of Bröxstônia is an Australian short animated non-dialogue television series created by Suren Perera and Stu Connolly. The show was originally commissioned as shorts for the launch of ABC3 and then as 3 minute episodes for a further 2 seasons. The third season was released as 7 minute episodes including the previously released 3 minute episodes, as well as fictional Bröxstônian advertisements for products unique to the show and the Bröxstônian country. The show initially aired on Cartoon Network in Asia, and later aired on Disney XD in the United States and Germany, Cartoon Network in Latin America and Kix (now Pop Max) in the UK.

== Premise ==
Dukes of Bröxstônia follows three teenage boys who make up a punk band from the fictional country of Bröxstônia. Singer Arj, drummer Barj and guitarist Larj are always on tour, enjoying fast-paced adventures, living the dream away from home as they deal with monstrous fans, cyborg robots, video game monsters and wild west villains. There's also their rivals, the Lukes of neighbouring country Flökstônia who are always out to thwart the Dukes, motivated by a historical conflict between their two countries which goes back thousands of years.

=== Dukes characters ===
- Arj – is the loud lead singer, he sports a unique punky hairstyle. His favourite food is donuts.
- Barj – is the bespectacled drummer, he has a terror of spiders, loves ice cream and often gets into trouble as he's impulsive.
- Larj – is the grotty guitarist of the band, he has sky blue hair and a unique relationship with his beloved guitar.

=== Lukes characters ===
All Lukes have the first name Luke. They are a boy band from neighbouring Floxstônia and are the Dukes' rivals.

=== Airing ===
==== Season 1 ====
Season 1 was aired on ABC3 and contain 10 episodes of 45 seconds, premiering on 2 August 2010 and ending on 2 January 2011 and was presented on 480 SDTV format.

==== Season 2 ====
Season 2 was aired on ABC3 and contain 10 episodes of 3 minutes, premiering on 10 January 2011 and ending on 23 January 2012 and was presented on 1080i HDTV format.

==== Season 3 ====
Season 3 was aired on ABC3 and contain 10 episodes of 7 minutes (official running), premiering on 15 April 2013 and ending on 26 April 2013 and was presented on 1080i HDTV format.
