= John Safran vs God =

2004 Australian TV series

- Genre: Documentary
- Developed by: Ghost Pictures
- Written by: John Safran; Mark O'Toole
- Directed by: Craig Melville
- Presented by: John Safran
- Opening theme: Peter Isaac
- Composer: Chris Copping
- Country of origin: Australia
- Original language: English
- No. of seasons: 1
- No. of episodes: 8

Production
- Executive producer: Richard Lowenstein
- Producers: Richard Lowenstein; Selin Yaman; Ghost Pictures
- Running time: 28 minutes
- Production company: Ghost Pictures

Original release
- Network: SBS Independent
- Release: 30 August – 18 October 2004

John Safran vs God is an eight-part television documentary series by John Safran which was broadcast on SBS TV of Australia in 2004. It has been described in a media release as "John Safran's most audacious project yet". It had a much more serious tone than Safran's previous work Music Jamboree. The show was released by Ghost of Your Ex-Boyfriend Productions and SBS Independent, was co-written with Mark O'Toole, directed by Craig Melville, and produced by Richard Lowenstein, Selin Yaman, and Ghost Pictures. The production team was known as Ghost of Your Ex-Boyfriend Productions, an amalgamation of John Safran's Ex-Boyfriend Productions, and Richard Lowenstein's Ghost Productions. The series won the 2005 Australian Film Institute Award for Best Comedy Series.

The show's opening theme is "Hate Priest" by the band Mozart on Crack. The opening sequence features John in a black suit breaking out of a patch of black scorched earth with his bare hands during a thunderstorm. The words of Revelation 20:7, "when the thousand years are over Satan will be released from his prison", are spoken in a low pseudo-ominous voice.

== Episode guide ==
=== Episode one ===
- In the UK, Safran meets Sheikh Omar Bakri and Sheikh Abu Hamza and succeeds in getting a fatwa placed on Rove McManus for dropping John's scheduled appearance on Rove Live. The fatwa was later removed from McManus.
- Safran tries out a religion based on the hallucinogenic cactus plant Peyote; vomiting and weak hallucinations ensue.
- Safran examines Scientology at the expense of Jamie Packer and the Nine Network.

=== Episode two ===
- Safran looks at the duplicity of Australia's "Sorry" attitude to Indigenous Rights
- Safran tries out zen Buddhism in Japan, the segment includes two incidents of Safran being beaten with a stick as punishment for mistakes made with meditation and philosophical questions
- Safran examines the link between Satanism and Freemasonry

=== Episode three ===
- Despite being Jewish, Safran attempts to join a branch of the Ku Klux Klan in California
- Safran tries out Catholicism under the guidance of Father Bob Maguire
- Safran holds a competition in which Australian-Palestinians vie for his Israeli citizenship by recreating segments from Music Jamboree

=== Episode four ===
- Safran examines Mormon cinema in Salt Lake City, proposing his "Extreme Mormons" film
- Safran tries out Vodou in Haiti, participating in the "Day of the Dead" ceremony
- John visits a Jewish gun advocate and rabbi in Los Angeles, in a bid to show that American gun rights activists consist of more than fundamentalist Christians

The Vodou segment was graphic, featuring the TV crew being attacked, spiritual possession, and a goat having its testicles bitten off and its throat slit.

=== Episode five ===
- John travels to Sicily to confess to a priest that he stole some batteries and masturbated in a bed owned by the priest during Race Around the World
- Again in Salt Lake City, Safran tries some atheistic door knocking to harass local Mormons
- In India, Safran tries out the spiritual teachings of several Hindu gurus

=== Episode six ===
- John auditions for the Harlem Gospel Choir with a tuneless rendition of "Amazing Grace"
- John tries out Ásatrú ("the Viking religion") taking part in a remembrance ceremony in the United States
- Big Brother series one contestant Sara-Marie Fedele helps Safran attempt to broker peace between Australian representatives of both sides of the Israeli–Palestinian conflict.
- Inspired by rumours in Malawi John confronts Australian politicians in Canberra to try and discover if any are vampires

The only politician who was found to be a so-called "vampire" was Kevin Rudd who would later become Prime Minister.

=== Episode seven ===
- John travels to Mozambique to lift a curse from the Socceroos at the behest of football legend Johnny Warren
- Again in Salt Lake City, Safran finds out what is so special about "Mormon underwear"
- With the help of Canberra mathematician Brendan McKay, John uncovers the link between The Bible Code, the September 11 attacks, and rapper Vanilla Ice
- John examines the realistic goals of religious boycotts

=== Episode eight ===
The eighth episode was the most controversial. Instead of its usual format of various segments, the show featured a single story: the exorcism of John's demons by Christian exorcist and fundamentalist preacher Bob Larson. There was none of the humour that characterised the preceding episodes. The exorcism was dramatic and realistic and no explanation was given at the end of the episode as to John's behaviour. On the Yahoo! "Cult of Safran" web group a stormy discussion started on whether John was actually faking - Safran's lisp is absent while allegedly possessed. Safran appeared in several radio and television plug spots for the show post-production/pre-screening and only briefly commented on the exorcism episode as a very intense segment to film. After the screening of the episode, Safran appeared in an interview on ABC radio and said he didn't remember a lot of the experience. The sales pitch for the DVD is "you've seen the exorcism, now buy the DVD".

== See also ==
- List of Australian television series
