= John Safran =

Australian filmmaker and radio personality (born 1972)

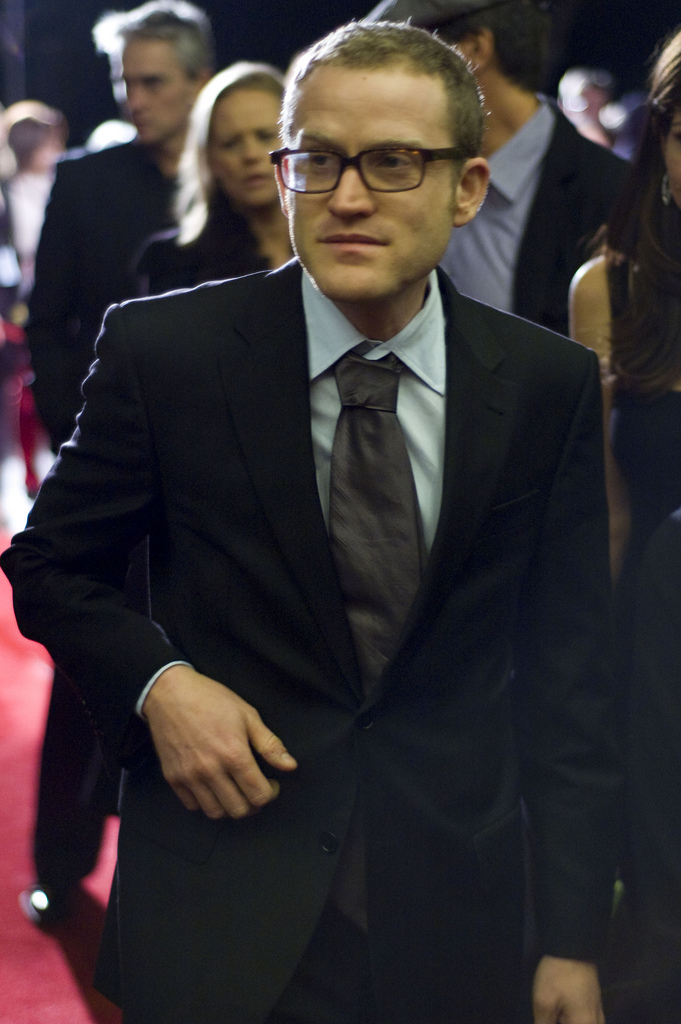
- Safran at the 2009 Melbourne International Film Festival
- Born: John Michael Safran; 13 August 1972 (age 54); Melbourne, Victoria, Australia
- Other names: Yehoshua Safran (Hebrew: יְהוֹשֻׁעַ ספרן)
- Occupations: Documentarian; Journalist; Radio presenter; Author
- Years active: 1997–present
- Known for: John Safran's Music Jamboree; John Safran vs God; Race Around the World; Sunday Night Safran
- Notable work: Murder in Mississippi
- Parents: Alex Safran (father); Gitl Obronzka (mother)
- Relatives: Margaret (sister)
- Website: www.johnsafran.com

John Michael Safran (Hebrew: יְהוֹשֻׁעַ ספרן, romanized: Yehoshua Safran; born 13 August 1972) is an Australian radio personality, satirist, documentary maker and author, known for combining humour with religious, political and ethnic issues. First gaining fame appearing in Race Around the World in 1997, Safran went on to produce a series of documentaries, television shows and host radio programs.

Safran is known for his television stunts, which include placing a fatwa on Australian television host Rove McManus, sneaking nine young men into an exclusive Melbourne nightclub by disguising them as members of American nu metal band Slipknot, running through Jerusalem wearing nothing but the beanie and scarf of St Kilda Football Club, driving a remote-controlled seagull with a cigarette onto the Melbourne Cricket Ground, and his confrontation with A Current Affair host Ray Martin.

He currently works as a journalist and author. He released his latest book, Squat, in October 2024.

== Early life ==
Safran was born in Melbourne to Jewish parents. His maternal grandparents were Polish Jewish Bundists. Safran's mother, Gitl, was born in Uzbekistan as they were fleeing their home country for Australia. She died in 2003. His paternal ancestors were German Jews and left shortly before the rise of Nazi Germany. He has one older sister, Margaret.

He grew up in Balwyn North and attended North Balwyn Primary School, Balwyn High School and Yeshivah College from Year 8 onwards. He describes himself at Yeshivah, an all-boys Orthodox Jewish school, as being "the least religious kid in the most religious school in Australia".

After school he studied journalism at RMIT University. He eventually dropped out without completing his degree and began work in advertising for Clemenger Harvie. During this time he also worked as a copywriter for Mazda, Village Roadshow and Sea World, where he wrote the company's jingle.

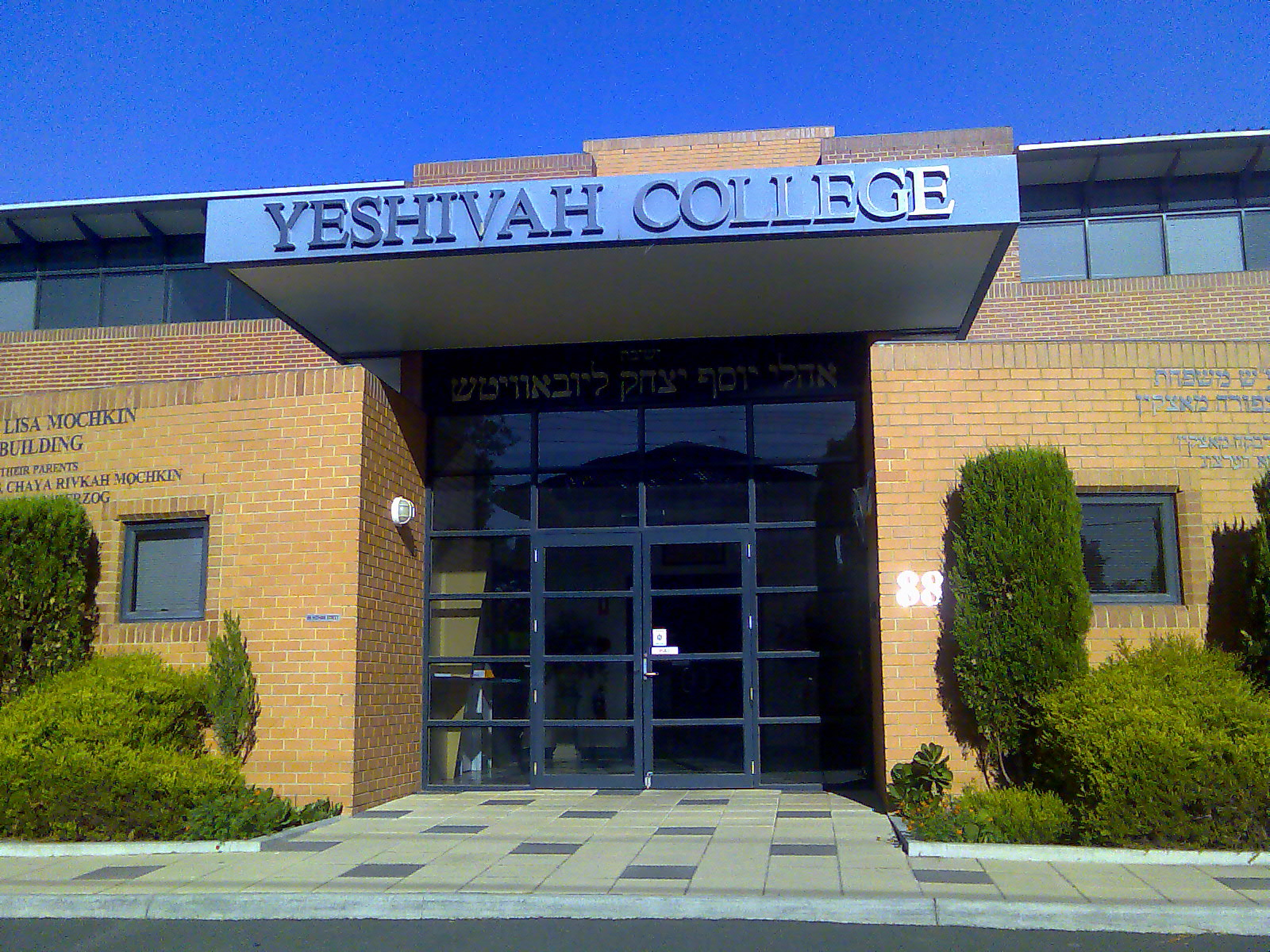
Yeshivah College, Melbourne

During his final year in high school, Safran formed the hip-hop group Raspberry Cordial with his friend Chris Lumsden. They played to some success, receiving high rotation airplay on the city's community radio, playing many gigs in Melbourne and coming second in the RMIT Battle of the Bands competition.

After winning a government youth music initiative, they followed up with Taste Test, of which 500 copies were pressed. Of those only 93 sold, so the remaining 407 had to be crushed. He said that the world just "wasn't ready for white rappers then" and Raspberry Cordial "broke down the wall that Eminem's been able to walk through", referencing the well-known Caucasian rapper Eminem and his success in an industry predominantly African-American.

== Career ==
=== 1997–1998: Race Around the World ===
Safran's first experience of national fame came via Race Around the World, a television competition for young documentarians run by the ABC. In his audition tape, Safran was required to submit ten seconds of black, but instead he submitted ten seconds of yellow.

Safran started the race off timid and tame, being locked inside an Osaka subway station in his first entry. However, he quickly broke what he called the "fear barrier" to film his now famous segments. He ran streaking naked through the streets of Jerusalem wearing only the scarf and beanie of his favourite football club, St Kilda, to prove that God is Jewish (St Kilda's only Grand Final win fell on the same day as Yom Kippur). He was baptised and placed a Voodoo curse on his ex-girlfriend in the Ivory Coast. He sneaked into Disneyland via a work area and attached information plaques he made about founder Walt Disney to a display (highlighting little-known Disney "facts" such as Walt Disney's alleged early support for Adolf Hitler) and got a Catholic priest to review death metal music.

Safran's segments scored well with both the judges and the public audience, Safran topped the viewer poll. He was, however, disqualified for a segment taped in a confessional booth (the program forbade hidden camera footage); the disqualification of the segment and subsequent loss of points meant that he finished last in the first season of Race Around the World.

=== 1998–2002: After The Race ===
After this brush with fame, the ABC commissioned two 30-minute TV pilots from Safran.

One pilot called John Safran: Media Tycoon focused on the media industry, airing in 1998. It became famous for a segment involving Ray Martin, then host of tabloid current affairs TV show A Current Affair, where Safran harassed him in the style characteristic of A Current Affair by sorting through his bin, which was later satirised by comedian Shaun Micallef. Martin had set up members of the Paxton family. Safran and one of the victims, Shane Paxton, turned up to Martin's home. Martin and his wife Dianne physically threatened Safran. Martin's wife ripped apart Safran's papier mâché hat and Ray grabbed Safran by the collar, prompting Shane Paxton to intervene. Martin was in contact with the ABC and specifically warned Safran in the segment that he had spoken to Roger Grant, who was then Head of Corporate Affairs at the ABC. Martin's connection with this executive at the ABC is suspected to be a reason the series never made it to air. The Ray Martin segment was later played on Media Watch, John Safran: The Lost Pilot and on YouTube. In 2014, Martin still appeared bitter about the incident, calling Safran a "serial pest".

The second pilot was titled John Safran: Master Chef. This pilot focused on the food industry. Notably, it featured a cooking segment where Safran prepared a beef dish. The twist comes when he arrives at an abattoir and shows detailed footage of cows being slaughtered to complete the dish. Though all unsuccessful, the pilots became hits via the Internet among university students. Safran also recorded a parody of Baz Luhrmann's song "Everybody's Free (To Wear Sunscreen)" entitled "Not the Sunscreen Song", which includes lines such as "Never live in Adelaide, it's a hole" and "Remember, you can't get pregnant the first time you have sex". It peaked at No. 20 in 1998 and was nominated for an ARIA. In Triple M's 2005 Greatest Songs Ever Written and Performed Since the Beginning of Time poll, "Not the Sunscreen Song" came in at #706 – one spot above "Superstition" by Stevie Wonder.

Safran also presented segments for the Seven Network's now defunct The Late Report, some were also screened in the United Kingdom with Channel 4's Disinformation program. Safran attained police attention for a stunt to try and coerce cricketer Shane Warne into breaking a "no smoking" clause in an advertising contract with a nicotine gum manufacturer. Safran drove a remote controlled seagull with a cigarette onto the MCG pitch during a match. He was arrested for "pitch invasion", but the charges were dropped.

=== 2002–2003: Music Jamboree ===
In 2002, Safran launched his documentary series John Safran's Music Jamboree. On one occasion Safran and his crew stormed the courtyard of his former school and amid shocked religious students and teachers, he and his crew began to dance to the song "Footloose". He was also able to gain entry into an exclusive Melbourne night club by dressing up nine men as the band Slipknot. Screened on SBS on Saturday nights, it opened Safran's work to youth 12 to 20 years old, who had not seen the original Race Around the World material. The show won the AFI award in 2003 for "Best Comedy Series".

=== 2004–2005: John Safran vs God ===
In August 2004 he debuted his new show John Safran vs God, also on the SBS television network. The first seven episodes were typical Safran informative satire. The series' finale featured Safran being exorcised of demons which had supposedly possessed him during his dabblings with world religions. The exorcism was performed by well-known Christian fundamentalist Bob Larson. In an interview with an Australian radio personality, Safran said that he "felt something was going on", and that "there was something about the expression on my face". In an interview on Andrew Denton's Enough Rope program, he claimed that he had no memory of the events during the exorcism, and stated that the footage shown on the show was merely the most interesting from hours of footage. John Safran vs God won a 2005 AFI Award for "Best Comedy Series".

Before the exorcism, Safran went to Mozambique to have a curse, previously placed on the Australian national football team by a now-deceased witch doctor, lifted. He and former Australian football team captain Johnny Warren were covered in chicken's blood in the process. Subsequently, on 16 November 2005, Australia qualified for the World Cup for the first time since 1974.

=== 2005: Speaking in Tongues ===
In 2005 and 2006, Safran co-hosted a television talk show entitled Speaking in Tongues with Father Bob Maguire, a Catholic priest who was featured in John Safran vs God. The 12-part series broadcast on SBS Television and began on 7 November 2005.

=== 2007–2010: Race Relations ===
Safran spent portions of 2007 in Los Angeles shooting a pilot entitled John Safran Saves America for American MTV in which he tried to convince emos to fight in Iraq, visited therapists who claim they can cure people of racism, and attempted to become gay to increase his standing in Hollywood. Safran stated in an interview that he had not heard back from the production company Reveille Productions whether the program has been purchased for production or not but as time went by, "the answer isn't getting any yesser".

In 2009 John Safran's Race Relations, an eight-part comedy documentary television series, was picked up by the ABC. As part of this series, on 10 April 2009, John Safran took part in a devotional crucifixion, an annual event occurring on Good Friday in the Philippines. Safran was crucified in Barangay Kapitangan, Paombong, Bulacan, just outside Manila along with three other men and one woman. He had nails driven through his hands and feet and hung on the cross for five minutes before being taken down and given medical treatment in a nearby tent set up for the purpose. It was nominated for a 2010 Logie Award in the category of Light Entertainment.

== Radio presenter and Sunday Night Safran ==
As of 2002, Safran had been a regular host of Melbourne community radio station 3RRR (Triple R) on its morning show "Breakfasters". Additionally, he co-hosted the weekly radio show Sunday Night Safran on national youth radio station Triple J with Father Bob Maguire. After a lengthy hiatus late 2008 due to a busy filming schedule, Sunday Night Safran returned to the airwaves on 12 July 2009. The program ended at the end of 2015.

The program was iconic because the co-hosts talked to each other for much longer than instructed to (one such incident involved Fr Bob and Safran looking up the word monstrance in a dictionary following a dispute) and referring to the audience as "Dear Listeners". By Safran's own admission, Maguire and he "only seem to talk about Scrabble and White Supremacists".

During the program's run, Safran and Maguire were able to get interviews from people such as religious scholar Reza Aslan, Julian Assange's mother Christine, The Exorcist star Linda Blair, philosopher and School of Life founder Alain de Botton, writer, retired prison doctor and psychiatrist Theodore Dalrymple, West Memphis Three Damien Echols, antitheist Christopher Hitchens, conspiracy theorist David Icke, former white supremacist skinhead Frank Meeink, pro-euthanasia doctor Philip Nitschke, The Act of Killing director Joshua Oppenheimer, journalist and writer Jon Ronson, true crime writer and Ted Bundy co-worker Ann Rule, the Lizardman Erik Sprague, African-American pro-Israel political activist and Zionist Chloé Valdary, Jewish activist against child sexual abuse Manny Waks, psychic Lisa Williams and John Safran's dad, Alex.

== Non-fiction writing and journalism ==
After discovering that a subject of his series Race Relations, "Mississippi's most notorious white supremacist" Richard Barrett, had been murdered, Safran returned to Mississippi to cover the trial. In 2013 Penguin Books published Safran's memoir of his experiences on this trip, Murder in Mississippi (published as God'll Cut You Down in the US). In 2014 he received a Ned Kelly Award for Best True Crime for the book. Safran writes for a number of newspapers, including the Sydney Morning Herald and Vice News.

Safran has also written a book about extremism in Australia, titled Depends What You Mean By Extremist. It was published in May 2017.

His investigation into Big Tobacco, Puff Piece was published in August 2021. It was shortlisted for the 2022 Prime Minister's Literary Award for Nonfiction.

His book Squat, released in October 2024, describes his experience squatting in a Los Angeles mansion owned by Kanye West.

== Personal life ==
Safran's favourite board game is Scrabble. However, he prefers to play one-on-one compared with four or more players, as he considers that a one-on-one game is a "game of skill" instead of a "game of luck". He also owns all the comprehensive Scrabble dictionaries. Furthermore, Safran has a Scrabble Rug, a Scrabble board costume, Michael Groves Special Edition Scrabble, Hebrew Scrabble, CD-Rom Scrabble, Keyring Scrabble and a Scrabble watch.

John Safran was painted by Yvette Coppersmith and entered in the 2009 Archibald Prize. The painting was a finalist. A portrait by Avraham Vofsi titled John Safran as David and Goliath was a finalist in the 2022 Archibald Prize.

Safran has stated that he believes in a force or unifying spirit, and has some "supernatural beliefs". He went on to explain that he doesn't think "these things have to be absolutely true to sort of be invigorating". Furthermore, he thinks mysticism is "a bit like trying to see how long you can hold your breath underwater or like driving without a seatbelt and it’s just like it’s fun. Like so basically religion is a bit like – trying to ban religion is like trying to ban snowboarding or something. It’s just like the rituals are just – can be really fun". He thinks that organised religion "gets a pretty good break in Australia", as they don't have to pay as much tax and are allowed to preach against homosexuals.

Safran publicly stated that religious education should be allowed in schools, and disagrees that it is manipulation.

It’s like saying if you’re going to listen to heavy metal albums you’re going to go on shooting sprees. It’s not like having a chaplain in your school like it’s the only influence that’s going to be on the kid. [...] You’re just going to jump into strange people, so you bump into the chaplain and he’s teaching you all that strange stuff and then, I don’t know, you grow up and then you’ve got these cool stories about the mad chaplain at your school.

Safran's first date was with a girl called Meg whom he was doing work experience with at the Australian Jewish News in Year 10. They saw Indiana Jones and the Last Crusade together. At university he began a relationship with a Bolivian girl, but it ended because Safran was "obsessed with [his] creative work", and at 19 Safran did not want the relationship to turn into something more serious.

Safran dated playwright Lally Katz.

== Work ==
=== Bibliography ===
| Date first published | Title | Publisher information | Notes |
|---|---|---|---|
| 25 September 2013 | Murder in Mississippi (Published as God'll Cut You Down in the US) | Hamish Hamilton, paperback, ISBN 1-92642-846-3 | Awarded the 2014 Ned Kelly Award for True Crime |
| 1 May 2017 | Depends What You Mean By Extremist | Hamish Hamilton, paperback, ISBN 978-1-92-642877-2 | |
| 31 August 2021 | Puff Piece | Hamish Hamilton, paperback, ISBN 978-1-76-089015-5 | |
| 22 October 2024 | Squat | Penguin, paperback, ISBN 978-1-76-089017-9 | |

=== Filmography ===
| Year | Title | Functioned as | | | | |
| Year | Title | Writer | Producer | Host | Actor | Notes |
|---|---|---|---|---|---|---|
| 1997 | Race Around the World | No | No | No | Yes | Racer |
| 1998 | John Safran: Master Chef | Yes | No | Yes | No | |
| 1998 | John Safran: Media Tycoon | Yes | No | Yes | No | |
| 1999 | 13 Secret Herbs & Spices (Short) | No | No | No | Yes | Chickenman |
| 1999 | The Late Report | Yes | No | Yes | No | |
| 2000 | The Big Schmooze | No | No | Yes | No | |
| 2002 | Music Jamboree | Yes | Yes | Yes | No | Won 2003 AACTA Award for Best Television Comedy Series |
| 2004 | John Safran vs God | Yes | Yes | Yes | No | Won 2005 AACTA Award for Best Television Comedy Series |
| 2004 | Medusa: First Date (Short) | No | No | No | Yes | Parrot |
| 2004 | Dentally Disturbed (Short) | No | No | No | Yes | Radio DJ |
| 2005 | Webster Say (Short) | No | No | No | Yes | Slacks man |
| 2005-2006 | Speaking in Tongues | Yes | Yes | Yes | No | |
| 2008 | Professor Pebbles | No | No | No | Yes | Voice |
| 2009 | John Safran's Race Relations | Yes | Yes | Yes | No | |
| 2011 | Jedis & Juggalos: Your Census Guide | Yes | Yes | Yes | No | |
| 2011 | The Bazura Project | No | No | No | Yes | Lee's father |
| 2012 | Cedric & Hope (Short) | No | No | No | Yes | Lemming |
| 2013 | In Bob We Trust | No | No | No | Yes | Himself |
| 2016 | The Goddam Election! | No | No | Yes | No | |
| 2022 | King Gizzard & The Lizard Wizard - Black Hot Soup (DJ Shadow's "My Own Reality" Re-Write Music Video) | No | No | No | Yes | Dancer |
| 2026 | Race Around the World | No | No | No | No | Judge |

=== Discography ===
| Title | Year | Peak chart positions | Album |
| Title | Year | AUS | Album |
|---|---|---|---|
| Melbourne Tram | 1991 | — | Melbourne Tram |
| "There's No Kangaroos in My Backyard" | 1991 | — | Melbourne Tram |
| "Let's Play Matchbox Cars" | 1991 | — | Melbourne Tram |
| "University Elevator Music" | 1993 | — | Taste Test |
| "Not the Sunscreen Song" | 1997 | 20 | |
| "Jew Town" | 2002 | — | non-album single |
| "Some Bobby That I Used to Know" (feat. Bob Maguire) | 2012 | — | non-album single |
"—" denotes releases that did not chart or were not released.
