= Hyakumonogatari Kaidankai =

Japanese parlor game

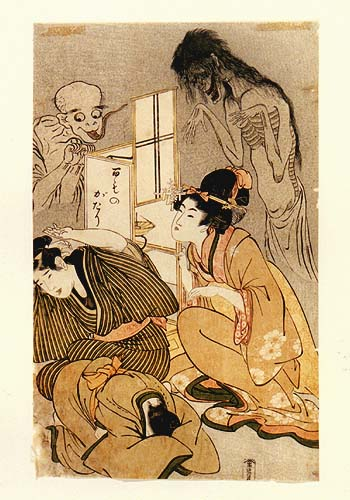
Kitagawa Utamaro, One Hundred Stories of Demons and Spirits

Hyakumonogatari Kaidankai (百物語怪談会; lit. "A Gathering of One Hundred Supernatural Tales") was a popular didactic Buddhist-inspired parlour game during the Edo period in Japan.

== Play ==
The game is played after nightfall in one of two ways.

The simplest form involves participants sitting in a circle in a room where 100 andon lamps or candles are lit. As participants take turns telling ghost stories and tales of the supernatural, a lantern is snuffed out after each story, causing the room to become darker and darker as the night and the game progress.

A second variation integrates elements of a kimodameshi "test of courage" into the game. Rather than one room, three connected rooms are used. In one of the end rooms, 99 andon lamps or candles are lit, and a small mirror positioned on a table. Guests gather in the other end room, with the 100th lamp. The center room remains empty and unlit. Ideally, the rooms are arranged in an L-shape so guests can see the light from the lantern room, but have no direct line of sight from the storytelling room into the lantern room, but this is not required. After each story, the storyteller takes the lamp, leaving the other participants in darkness as they pass through the center, empty room and into the lantern room. There, they extinguish one of the 99 lamps, look into the mirror, and then return to the group. The final lamp is extinguished after the final storyteller, or entire group, travels to the lantern room to snuff it out in front of the mirror.

The game is considered a ritual method of summoning spirits, with the supernatural arriving and being present in the darkness after the 100th lamp is snuffed out. Due to this superstition, it is a common practice for participants to leave the game incomplete, and stop after the ninety-ninth tale, symbolically leaving the 100th story untold and the final lamp still lit to prevent summoning any supernatural beings who may have been drawn by the stories. On a practical note, completing all 100 tales takes many hours and players may run out of stories, so shorter versions of the game are popular.

Because so many stories are required to complete the full game, guests often began to bring books and anthologies of ghoulish encounters and folkloric tales passed on by villagers who claimed to have experienced supernatural encounters to recite. These tales soon became known as kaidan.

== History ==
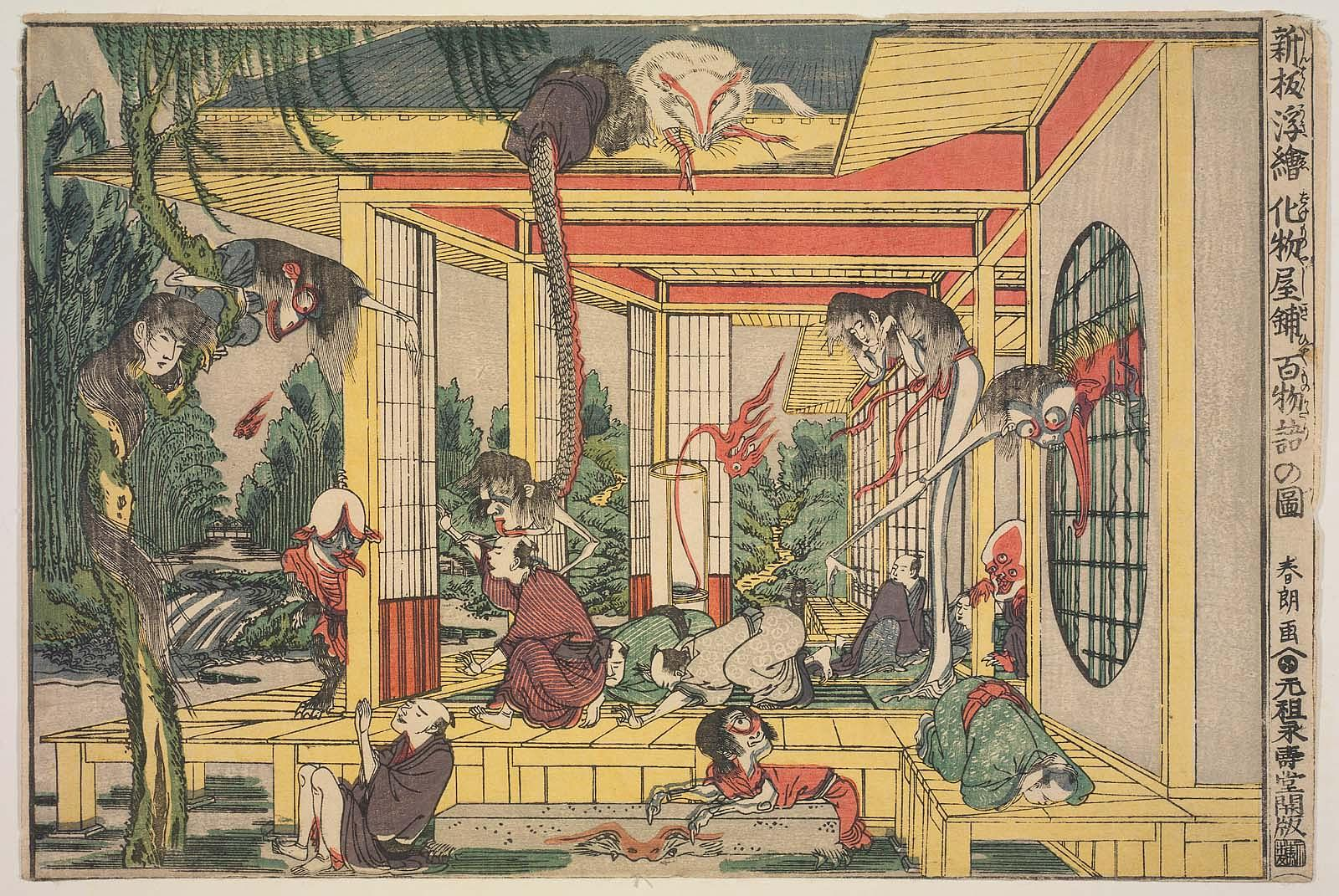
Hokusai, One Hundred Ghost Stories in a Haunted House (Shinpan uki-e bakemono yashiki hyaku monogatari no zu), c. 1790

The exact origins of Hyakumonogatari Kaidankai are unknown. It is believed that it was first played amongst the samurai class as a test of courage. In Ogita Ansei's 1660 nursery tale "Otogi Monogatari", a version of Hyakumonogatari Kaidankai was described in which the narrative tells of several young samurai telling tales in the vein of the game. In the tale, as one samurai finished the one-hundredth tale, he began to extinguish the candle when suddenly he sees a giant gnarled hand descend upon him from above. While some of the samurai cowered in fear, a swipe of his sword revealed the hand to be merely the shadow of a spider.

Summer is the traditionally-preferred season for playing the game. This is both because Obon (the Japanese festival of the dead) takes place in the summer and because of the Japanese folk belief that the shivers and goosebumps from being afraid have a cooling effect desired in the sweltering summer heat.

At first, the game was popular amongst the aristocratic warrior class, but it soon garnered favorable reputation amongst the working class peasants and town people. With a heightened interest in telling newer and original kaidan, people began scouring the countryside for tales of the mysterious, many of which combined a mixture of ghostly vengeance and elements of karma in Buddhism.

A true popular phenomenon, the hype of Hyakumonogatari Kaidankai (combined with new printing technology) created a boom in the publication of kaidan-themed books collecting appropriate tales from every corner of Japan and China. In 1677, the first kaidan-shu was published. Known as Shokoku Hyakumonogatari (100 Tales of Many Countries) the book earned popularity for having been a compilation of tales from people residing in several countries, and who further claimed each tale was true.

Later books in this genre also often used the term Hyakumonogatari in the title; the popularity of many of these tales continued long after the fad for the game had faded.

== In other media ==
Hyakumonogatari Kaidankai became a cult phenomenon in Japan; while the hype of these tales has receded, many J-horror films and Japanese urban legends can be attributed to the game's influence.

Woodblock painter and founder of the Maruyama-Shijo School of Painting Maruyama Okyo is considered the first artist to offer paintings of the yūrei who were frequently cast in kaidan.

The telling of tales in a game of Hyakumonogatari Kaidankai formed the basis of the 1968 film Yokai Monsters: 100 Monsters.

In 2002, the TV series Kaidan Hyakumonogatari (starring Naoto Takenaka) aired on Fuji TV. The series used the basis of Hyakumonogatari Kaidankai to tell classic Japanese ghost stories and ran for 11 episodes.

The popularity of the game is not limited to Japan; in the Paranormal State episode "Freshman Fear", members of the Penn State Paranormal Research Society play the Ancient Japanese Game of One Hundred Candles during their investigation of a supposed haunting in a student dormitory.

Other cultural influences include:

- The tenth episode of the anime xxxHolic where Yūko invites Watanuki, Doumeki and Himawari to a game of Hyakumonogatari Kaidankai.
- An episode of the anime School Rumble where the students of 2-C can be seen playing the game throughout the episode.
- The opening of the anime Ghost Hunt.
- A scene in the manga Sundome where the members of the Roman Club play the game.
- The Girls und Panzer spin-off manga Girls und Panzer: Motto Love Love Sakusen Desu! where the girls in the sensha-dō club organize a Hyakumonogatari night (with the Edo period history buff making full use of rakugo conventions). The game is seen in a more comical tone with the various team recounting mysterious events like everything was either completely normal or of no importance.
- "100 Stories", one of the "conversation skills" in Persona 2: Eternal Punishment, which includes a special reward for when players manage to display all 100 scripted stories.
  - The book item 100 Ghost Stories that can be read in Persona 4 to increase Courage.
- The 1968 film Yokai Monsters:100 Monsters starring Miwa Takada.
- The fifth episode of the anime Sengoku Otome: Momoiro Paradox where the main characters are forced to participate in the game by a group of undead samurai warriors.
- The book Night Film by Marisha Pessl.
- The anime Kaidan Restaurant where each episode is broken up into three "dishes" (Appetizer, Main Dish, and Dessert); the "Dessert" is a ghost story told by one of the main characters while playing the game.
- Volume 3 of The Zashiki Warashi of Intellectual Village visual novel series.
- The MMORPG The Secret World where friendly ultraterrestrials explain in communications left around Tokyo's Oni-and-Elder-God-besieged Kaidan neighborhood that Hyakumonogatari Kaidankai was a name originally referring to themselves before it was given to the game that they had in fact created in order to gently educate humanity about the dangers facing it in such places.
- Anthony Bourdain's comic series Hungry Ghosts where the game is used as a framing device to tell several horror stories derived from popular folklore.
- The Legend of the Five Rings Roleplaying Game tabletop RPG where Hyakumonogatari Kaidenkai features prominently in the Book of Void sourcebook (both as a game played by characters in the setting and as a particular book).
- An episode of the anime Yamishibai where a group of characters play the game and recite all the preceding episodes of the series before that episode.
- An episode of the anime The Apothecary Diaries where Maomao and Yinghua swap scary ghost stories during a hot summer night with palace women in a dark enclosed room.

== See also ==
- Hyakunin Isshu
- Kaidan
- Karuta
- Kimodameshi
