= Asheville School =

Prep school in Asheville, North Carolina, US

Location
- 360 Asheville School Road; Asheville, North Carolina 28806; United States; 35°33′43″N 82°37′21″W
- Asheville School
- U.S. National Register of Historic Places
- U.S. Historic district
- Location: Roughly bounded by Patton Ave., Norfolk Southern rail line, Interstate 40, Sand Hill Rd., and Malvern Hills subdivision, Asheville, North Carolina
- Built: 1900
- Architects: Beadle, Chauncey, et al
- Architectural style: Tudor Revival
- NRHP reference No.: 96000614
- Added to NRHP: June 3, 1996

Information
- Type: Private, Boarding
- Established: 1900 (126 years ago)
- CEEB code: 340120
- Head of school: Anthony H. Sgro
- Faculty: 65.8
- Enrollment: 295 (2019)
- Average class size: 14 students
- Student to teacher ratio: 5:1
- Campus size: 300 acres (120 ha)
- Campus type: Suburban
- Colors: Blue and white
- Athletics: North Carolina Independent Schools Athletic Association (NCISAA)
- Tuition: Boarding Students: $76,950 Day Students: $47,660
- Website: www.ashevilleschool.org

Asheville School is a private university-preparatory boarding school in Asheville, North Carolina founded in 1900. The campus sits on 300 acres (120 ha) amid the scenic Blue Ridge Mountains and currently enrolls 295 students in grades nine through twelve. The campus was named by Architectural Digest magazine in 2018 as the most beautiful private school campus in North Carolina. In 2015, the school was ranked the seventh best boarding school in the U.S. by independent education organization TheBestSchools.org.

== History ==
Asheville School was founded in 1900 by Charles Andrews Mitchell and Newton Mitchell Anderson. Previously, the pair founded the University School in Cleveland, Ohio in 1890. Fifty-three male boarding students from grades five through twelve called "forms" were enrolled in the school's first year.

== Academics ==
Asheville School's academic course of study stresses a core curriculum of the humanities, sciences, mathematics, foreign language, and the arts.

Asheville School has a humanities program structured in a series of four year-long courses: Ancient Studies, World Studies, European Studies, and American Studies. The academic program focuses heavily on writing and ends with a final research project, the Senior Demonstration. The project requires seniors to produce one ten-page paper on a topic of their choosing and complete an oral defense for twenty minutes.

== Mountaineering ==
Asheville School has a mountaineering program where students can participate in backpacking, rock climbing, whitewater kayaking, snow skiing, caving, and mountain biking. Many students take mountaineering as an afternoon activity for daily on-campus instruction and practice. On-campus facilities include a high-ropes course, an Alpine Tower, a bouldering wall, a swimming pool (for kayak instruction), and 200 acres (0.81 km^{2}) of forested land with miles of trails for biking and exploring. Pupils go on trips to places such as Looking Glass Rock in Pisgah National Forest, the Tuckasegee and French Broad rivers, and the Tsali Recreational area. Early leaders of the outdoors program were mountaineering leaders Pop Hollandsworth and Vince Lee.

== Community life ==
The Asheville School student body is made up of approximately 80% boarding students and 20% day students. The school has students from twenty-six states and thirteen countries. Roughly a quarter of the students receive need-based financial aid. The school has about the same number of males and females.

Boarding students live in one of three dormitories: Lawrence Hall, Anderson Hall, and Kehaya House.

The school community gathers several times a week for chapel services and convocations. Sixth formers are required to deliver a ten-minute talk alongside another student, an event that (along with the Senior Demonstration) represents the capstone of a student's career at Asheville School.

The community service requirement–one that is common among boarding schools–differs at Asheville in that students complete 40 hours of service for one organization and submit an essay about that experience to the headmaster.

== Traditions ==
The football rival of Asheville School (the Blues) is Christ School (the Greenies). At Asheville School, the rivalry game is preceded by a week of festivities that culminates in a pep rally the evening before the Blues take the field. The Asheville School/Christ School rivalry represents North Carolina's longest-running high school athletic rivalry.

== Notable alumni ==
Notable alumni of Asheville School include:

- Roberts Blossom – theatre, film and television character actor, and poet
- Kent H. Dixon - author, scholar, translator
- Pete Dye – golf course designer
- Harvey Samuel Firestone Jr. – was chairman of the board of the Firestone Tire and Rubber Company
- Edward Gaylord – Oklahoma billionaire businessman, media mogul and philanthropist
- Langdon Brown Gilkey – Protestant ecumenical theologian
- José Antonio González Anaya – economist who served as the minister of finance and public credit of Mexico
- Perla Haney-Jardine – actress
- James Hormel – philanthropist, LGBT activist, and diplomat who served as the United States Ambassador to Luxembourg from 1999 to 2001
- Stephen A. Jarislowsky – Canadian business magnate, investor, and philanthropist
- Samuel Curtis Johnson, Jr. – businessman; fourth generation of his family to lead S. C. Johnson & Son, Inc.
- Roy Sangwoo Kim – singer-songwriter and radio presenter
- H. C. Robbins Landon – musicologist, journalist, historian and broadcaster
- Andrew Lownie – British historian and author
- Ralph Millard – plastic surgeon who developed several techniques used in cleft lip and palate surgeries
- Marisha Pessl – writer known for her novels Special Topics in Calamity Physics, Night Film, and Neverworld Wake
- Jennifer Pharr Davis – long distance hiker
- James Arthur "Art" Pope – North Carolina businessman, philanthropist, attorney and former government official
- Charles P. Ries – former U.S. diplomat
- Bellamy Young – actress and singer, best known for her role as Melody "Mellie" Grant in the ABC drama series Scandal
