= List of Working!! episodes =

Working!! DVD volume 1 cover

Working!! is an anime television series adapted from the four-panel comic strip manga series of the same title by Karino Takatsu. It was written and directed by Yoshimasa Hiraike and produced by A-1 Pictures. Chief animator Shingo Adachi also served as the character designer and Yōta Tsuruoka of Rakuonsha was the sound director. The story follows 16-year-old Sōta Takanashi who gets a part-time job working at the family restaurant Wagnaria. Sōta finds the people he works with have many quirks, himself included.

The first season of the anime aired between April 4 and June 26, 2010, on the Tokyo MX Japanese television network, and was later released on seven DVD compilation volumes, each containing two episodes, except for the first volume which contains one episode. The volumes were released between April 21 and October 27, 2010, by Aniplex. A Blu-ray Disc box set of the series will be released on August 24, 2011, in Japan by Aniplex. The anime is licensed for release in North America by NIS America, and an English-subtitled DVD box set was released in March 2011 under the title Wagnaria!!. A second anime season titled Working'!! aired between October 1 and December 24, 2011. A preview of the first episode aired on September 3, 2011. A third season, Working!!!, aired between July 4 and September 26, 2015, and is licensed in North America by Aniplex of America. A one-hour finale aired on December 26, 2015.

The last series takes place at another Wagnaria restaurant with a different main protagonist. High school freshman Daisuke Higashida reluctantly takes up a part-time job after his father's company goes bankrupt. Its title was WWW.Working!! and aired from October 1 to December 24, 2016.

The background music of the series was composed and arranged by Keiichi Okabe, Keiichi Hirokawa, Hidekazu Tanaka, Kuniyuki Takahashi and Keigo Hoashi of the group Monaca. Three pieces of theme music are used for the first season: one opening theme and two ending themes. The opening theme is "Someone Else" performed by Kana Asumi, Saki Fujita and Eri Kitamura, while the main ending theme is "Heart no Edge ni Idomō Go to Heart Edge" (ハートのエッジに挑もう Go to Heart Edge) performed by Jun Fukuyama, Daisuke Ono and Hiroshi Kamiya. The ending theme for episode nine is "Golden Day" (ゴールデン・デイ), also performed by Fujita. For the second season, the opening theme is "Coolish Walk", again performed by Asumi, Fujita and Kitamura, while the ending theme is "Itsumo no Yōni Love & Peace!!" (いつものようにLOVE&PEACE!!, Always Love & Peace!!), also performed by Fukuyama, Ono and Kamiya. For the third and final season, the opening theme is "Now!!! Gamble", once again performed by Asumi, Fujita and Kitamura, while the ending theme is "Matsuge ni Lock" (まつ毛にLOCK, Lock with your Eyelashes), once again performed by Fukuyama, Ono and Kamiya.

== Episode listing ==
=== Working!! (2010) ===
No.	Title	Original release date
1	"Welcome to Wagnaria: Takanashi Works."; Transliteration: "Wagunaria e Yōkoso Takanashi, Hataraku." (Japanese: ワグナリアへようこそ♪小鳥遊、働く。)	April 4, 2010
Popura Taneshima is an undersized high school girl working at a family restaurant named Wagnaria and is told by the manager to find a new employee. After asking strangers and friends, she finds a boy from her school named Sōta Takanashi who agrees to work at the restaurant. Sōta quickly adjusts to working at Wagnaria as he meets the other employees and learns their various quirks. Sōta gets on the bad side of the manager, Kyōko Shirafuji, after a comment about her age, leading her to overwork him for several weeks. One day, Sōta is put on the same shift with Mahiru Inami, a girl whom he had not met yet, who suffers from androphobia and punches Sōta in the face upon first meeting him.
2	"Inami, Androphobic. But I'm Scared..."; Transliteration: "Inami, Dansei Kyōfushō. Datte Kowainda mon..." (Japanese: 伊波、男性恐怖症。だって怖いんだもん...)	April 11, 2010
Sōta does not get along well with Mahiru due to her constantly punching him. Mahiru is also irritated by Sōta's comments and after talking with Popura she is adamant about getting him to change his opinion of her, though she affirms she still hates him. Fellow waitress Yachiyo Todoroki asks Mahiru to clear a table with male customers, but Sōta has to stop her before she hits them and Yachiyo covers for her. Sōta wonders if the restaurant will be okay with the employees all having strange quirks, but Popura assures him that they have regular returning customers as well as normal customers.
3	"Yachiyo, Kyōko, Satō... and the Returning Mr. Otoo"; Transliteration: "Yachiyo to Kyōko to Satō... to, Kaette Kita Otoo-san" (Japanese: 八千代と杏子と佐藤... と、帰ってきた音尾さん)	April 18, 2010
Sōta notices that Mahiru is perfect when it comes to female customers and asks her questions about her fear of men. Mahiru says she is trying to get over her fear and that talking with Sōta is easier than most men, though he is also easier to hit. Sōta wonders why Yachiyo carries a katana all the time since it scares the customers. Yachiyo tells him that it is because her family sells cutlery and that it is dangerous at night. One of the chefs, Jun Satō, tells Sōta of how Kyōko protected Yachiyo from bullies when she was in grade school, and in return, Yachiyo has been following Kyōko and makes parfaits for her at work. The general manager of Wagnaria, Otoo, appears at the restaurant; he rarely visits as he is always trying to find his missing wife. Yachiyo comes down with a cold and Kyōko tries to fill in for her in the meantime with not much luck. Several days later after Yachiyo returns, Popura remarks how Jun might like Yachiyo because he is always nice to her, and Sōta realizes this is true.
4	"Sōma, An Overly Refreshing Guy"; Transliteration: "Sōma, Sawayakasugiru Seinen" (Japanese: 相馬、さわやかすぎる青年)	April 25, 2010
One of Sōta's older sisters, Kozue, collapses drunk in front of Wagnaria, but he tries to keep the fact they are related a secret. Mahiru and chef Hiroomi Sōma find out however, and Mahiru also finds out that as a child Sōta used to be dressed like a girl by his parents and older sisters. Sōta pleads with her to keep this secret from everyone else. Sōta wonders what kind of person Hiroomi is, and quickly realizes that he uses people's secrets to blackmail them to do his work for him, despite appearing to be cheerful. Due to a comment from Hiroomi, Yachiyo asks Jun if he likes Kyōko, much to his annoyance. Sōta later finds out that Hiroomi is afraid of Mahiru and that he used to get punched a lot more before Sōta started working at Wagnaria.
5	"A Different Wagnaria than Usual on a Sick Day"; Transliteration: "Aru Kaze no Hi ni..., Itsumo to Chigau Wagunaria" (Japanese: ある風邪の日に...、いつもと違うワグナリア)	May 1, 2010
Mahiru tries her best to at least greet male customers at the door, but still cannot bring herself to overcome her fear. Hiroomi tells Sōta how Jun picks on Popura to relieve his stress related to Yachiyo giving all her attention to Kyōko. Yachiyo attempts to protect Popura, but they get scared by Jun. After another comment by Hiroomi, Yachiyo asks Jun if he likes Popura, and is again intimidated by Satō's response. When Sōta's younger sister gets sick, he takes her to the hospital, but without him at Wagnaria, Jun and Hiroomi have to help as waiters because Mahiru can only serve women. Kyōko works the register while Mahiru helps out in the kitchen. Sōta arrives after closing time and brings a care package for everyone due to the trouble caused by his absence.
6	"The Melancholy of Sōta, the Women of the Takanashi Family"; Transliteration: "Sōta no Yūutsu, Takanashi-ke no Onnatachi" (Japanese: 宗太の憂鬱、小鳥遊家の女達)	May 8, 2010
Sōta gets mad at his sisters for watching old home movies featuring him dressed like a girl. At work, Jun gives Yachiyo a gift for White Day, and Sōta gives gifts to Popura and Mahiru. At home, Sōta has a hard time dealing with his older sisters, and is starting to fear that his younger sister Nazuna will grow up to have a wicked personality. Sōta's sister Kozue gets mad at him for being overly nice to their sister Izumi, but when she enters his room to mess it up out of anger, she notices the old toy rabbit she gave him as a child is the only room decoration he owns. On the way home from the store, Sōta meets Inami and helps her to buy rice; they meet Sōta's sister Kazue on the way back. When he gets home, Kozue is no longer mad at Sōta because of the rabbit.
7	"Otoo Comes Back After a While, and the New Worker = Yamada (!?)"; Transliteration: "Hisashiburi no Otoo to, Atarashii Baito = Yamada (!?)" (Japanese: 久しぶりの音尾と、新しいバイト = 山田(!?))	May 15, 2010
Wagnaria manager Hyōgo Otoo brings back a mysterious girl who says her name is Aoi Yamada and is 16 years old, the same age as Sōta. Although Popura and Inami accept Aoi as a new member of Wagnaria, Sōta is aware her life story is a lie. Aoi constantly exhibits clumsiness and a lack of common sense, and as a result Sōta and Jun take an immediate disliking to her. Yachiyo befriends Aoi, whom she takes to be a mother-figure, while Otoo is labelled as her father-figure. Aoi tells Yachiyo that Jun has feelings for her, which later culminates in a disastrous confession by Jun and a denial by Yachiyo. Popura gets the two of them together the next day, where Jun decides to tell a subtle lie to calm Yachiyo down and get the restaurant back to normal.
8	"Inami's First? Outing!"; Transliteration: "Inami, Hajimete? no O-de-ka-ke!" (Japanese: 伊波、はじめて?のお・で・か・け!)	May 22, 2010
Wagnaria has to close down after a water pipe breaks, and Popura suggests going to an onsen. Sōta initially plans not on going due to having to air out some umeboshi, but his sister Nazuna tells him that she will take care of it. While Kyōko said she was going to drive the girls, she ends up oversleeping and by chance Jun meets the girls while driving to return some DVDs and offers to take them. While his car runs out of gas on the way, Kyōko drives up and the girls take her car instead, leaving Jun behind. Sōta and Hiroomi meet up with the girls and Sōta offers to take care of Inami, while Hiroomi is with Popura and Aoi, and Kyōko is with Yachiyo. At the end of the day when the girls are going back home, Mahiru thinks that Sōta was indeed very nice to her, but was rude when she hit him. Both Sōta and Hiroomi are driven home by Jun.
9	"Kotori-chan Appears!!"; Transliteration: "Kotori-chan Tōjō!!" (Japanese: ことりちゃん登場!!)	May 29, 2010
Mahiru's father heard from her mother that she received a gift on White Day from a boy, but Mahiru tried to hide this by saying she received the gift from a girl. With her father coming to Wagnaria to confirm whether this is true, Inami asks Sōta to cross-dress for the day to fool her father. While he initially refuses, the other employees get him to change his mind and he goes along with it, dressing as a girl and calling himself Kotori. When Mahiru's father finally arrives, Sōta starts a conversation with him, and finds out that he actually indoctrinated Mahiru over a period of ten years using films, TV and books to make her fear men, as well as placing heavy weights in all her belongings to make her muscles stronger. Sōta angrily lectures him about his parenting and tells him to go home and later apologize to his daughter. Mahiru realizes she is in love with Sōta after watching him stand up for her.
10	"The Truth to the Suspicion... Nazuna Works."; Transliteration: "Giwaku no Shinsō..., Nazuna Hataraku." (Japanese: 疑惑の真相...、なずな働く。)	June 5, 2010
Kyōko leaves for a business trip, leaving Yachiyo depressed, so Hiroomi offers Jun as her temporary replacement, which frustrates him until Kyōko's return. Popura tries to help Mahiru with her feelings for Sōta. Sōta and Mahiru walk home together as a first step in curing her fear of men, and Nazuna sees them together. Nazuna comes to work at Wagnaria the next day because of a report she needs to write for class. Nazuna confronts Mahiru after witnessing her usual behavior of hitting her brother, and asks her if he enjoys getting hit. Mahiru misunderstands, thinking Nazuna is asking if she likes Sōta, and responds yes, causing Nazuna to mistakenly think Sōta is a masochist. Sōta says to Mahiru that he will stand by her until he cures her of her androphobia.
11	"The Two of Them Back Then, Yachiyo and Satō. And, Welcome to the Takanashi Family"; Transliteration: "Ano Koro no Futari, Yachiyo to Satō. To, Yōkoso Takanashi-ke e" (Japanese: あの頃の二人、八千代と佐藤。と、ようこそ小鳥遊家へ)	June 12, 2010
Aoi believes that Popura has a crush on Sōta, but it turns out that she merely wants him to cross-dress because she admired him as a girl. Sōta refuses to cross-dress for her. Hiroomi brings some old photos of Kyōko, Yachiyo and Jun and they reminisce about what it was like back then. Kozue continues to visit the restaurant, causing Sōta problems. Later, Aoi reads a ghost story to Mahiru and Popura, the latter of whom has become so scared that Jun offers to drive her home. When Sōta and Mahiru are walking home, they discover that Aoi followed them because she too was scared of being alone, and Mahiru also does not want to go home alone. Sōta brings them back to his house for the night, where Mahiru and Aoi keep Kozue company while Sōta is able to get some chores done. Kozue hears from Aoi that Mahiru likes Sōta, and she is later disappointed to find them only playing cards together.
12	"What the!? The Last Night Before the Decisive Battle. Taneshima's Repayment"; Transliteration: "Nazeka!? no Kessen Zen'ya. Taneshima no Ongaeshi" (Japanese: なぜか!?の決戦前夜。種島の恩返し)	June 19, 2010
Popura feels that Sōta is keeping secrets from her, and she later muses about wanting to see him cross-dress again. Popura notices Sōta left his student ID with his commuting pass, and decides to take it back to his home, where she meets his three older sisters. When Sōta goes to apologize the following day about not telling her about his older sisters, he says he will honor any request, which leads Popura to suggest he go out on a date with Mahiru. Popura tries to help the situation by tying Mahiru's arms so she does not hit Sōta, but this fails as she kicks him instead. Mahiru spends much of the night before the date trying to decide on where to go and what to wear, while Sōta is more worried about surviving.
13	"The "Decisive Battle" Known As the Date, What Happens After With Takanashi and Inami..."; Transliteration: "Dēto to Iu Na no "Kessen", Takanashi to Inami no Sorekara..." (Japanese: デートと言う名の"決戦"、小鳥遊と伊波のそれから...)	June 26, 2010
Sōta arrives for his date with Mahiru though, thanks to the interference of Hiroomi, Aoi, and Popura, he ends up going dressed as Kotori. While Jun makes sure no one follows them on their date by taking the others for a meal and clothes shopping, Sōta and Mahiru go on their date, visiting a few cute places. At various points, Sōta tries to get Mahiru to hold his hand, though this gets interrupted either before they can touch, or before Mahiru tries to punch him. Meanwhile, back at Wagnaria, typically normal employee Maya Matsumoto is worried that the weirdness of the other employees is rubbing off on her. As rain starts to pour, Mahiru hears Sōta liken her to a dog. When Sōta tries to rectify what he said, he ends up calling her a "cute, vicious dog", with Mahiru getting hung up on the "cute" part. As they return to work the next day, life returns to normal.

=== Working'!! (2011) ===
No.	Title	Original release date
1	"Popura's Nature"; Transliteration: "Popura no Iji" (Japanese: ぽぷらの意地)	September 3, 2011 (preview); October 1, 2011
Popura becomes upset with Sōta constantly calling her small. Later, Sōta becomes devastated when Kyōko kills a bug, inadvertently insulting Popura and Mahiru in the process.
2	"Ideal for Family Planning"; Transliteration: "Risō no Kazoku Keikaku" (Japanese: 理想の家族計画)	October 8, 2011
Aoi becomes curious about Hiroomi's secret life and drags Popura into stalking him, despite the fact he is completely aware of it. Later, Popura tries to get Sōta to treat Mahiru nicer. Tired of Jun's teasing, Popura tries to get revenge on him which does not go to plan. Meanwhile, Aoi acts very clingily around Otoo after he comes back from his recent trip.
3	"What's Behind the Slump"; Transliteration: "Suranpu no Wake" (Japanese: スランプの理由)	October 15, 2011
Sōta's novelist sister Izumi enters a slump when she assumes he is dating Popura and will stop paying attention to her. She decides to go on a journey where she ends up meeting Mahiru who helps cheer her up. As Sōta looks after Izumi, Nazuna helps out at Wagnaria, which annoys Aoi who believes she is outshining her. After hearing about it, Nazuna puts on an act to make Aoi feel better about herself.
4	"Manhole Spiral"; Transliteration: "Manhōru Supairaru" (Japanese: マンホールスパイラル)	October 22, 2011
While out shopping for some more cream, Kyōko and Yachiyo end up meeting Otoo's long-lost wife, Haruna. As Yachiyo debates whether to tell Kyōko about her, she disappears again. As Yachiyo feels guilty about it, Mahiru learns about Jun's one-sided crush on Yachiyo and starts feeling sorry for him, leading Sōta to believe she has a crush on Jun. With some support from Jun, Yachiyo apologises to Otoo after he returns and cheers up.
5	"Wagnaria's Big Stomach"; Transliteration: "Wagunaria no Kyodai na Ibukuro" (Japanese: ワグナリアの巨大な胃袋)	October 29, 2011
Popura and the others try to think of ways to help Sōta get along better with Kyōko. Wanting to be spoiled in a similar manner to Kyōko, Aoi starts learning how to make parfaits, much to the dismay of Satō. In order to stop Kyōko from eating everything in the store, Hiroomi tells a white lie which leaves her stunned. When Sōta finds a lost girl, Kyōko is told to look after her, and even avoids taking her food. After the girl is reunited with her mother, Jun gives Kyōko some food as thanks.
6	"Hired, Fired, Tired"; Transliteration: "Shūnin, Kainin, Mō Kannin" (Japanese: 就任、解任、もう堪忍)	November 5, 2011
Popura and Jun end up catching colds due to Aoi's clumsiness, so Kyōko calls in two of her juniors, Yōhei and Mitsuki Mashiba, twin siblings who don't get along. When Kyōko offers to put someone else in charge of looking after Mahiru, Sōta becomes upset and falls out with Mahiru, but Mahiru soon manages to build up the courage to make up with him.
7	"Bad Tuning of Love"; Transliteration: "Koi no Baddo Chūningu" (Japanese: 恋のバッドチューニング)	November 12, 2011
Mahiru meets a boy calling himself Kirio Yamada, who she believes might be Aoi's brother. As he is able to withstand her punches, Mahiru ends up conversing well with Kirio, who starts developing feelings for her, but Sōta becomes downhearted when he sees the two getting along. He begins acting strangely the next day and ends up bashing his head against the wall, leading him to think he might have become a masochist. Later, Kozue manages to get the waitresses to dress up in animal cosplay.
8	"Oh, My Little Sister!"; Transliteration: "Aa, Imōto yo!" (Japanese: 嗚呼、妹よ)	November 19, 2011
Sōta becomes depressed when he discovers Nazuna has grown as tall as him and has Popura act like his little sister for the day. Mahiru becomes jealous of this and works with Hiroomi to try to get Sōta to call her cute. The next day, Kirio comes to Wagnaria to look for his sister, but finds himself coming into conflict with the men, while Hiroomi attempts to keep him and Aoi from meeting each other.
9	"Love is So Global"; Transliteration: "Ai wa Konna ni Gurōbaru" (Japanese: 愛はこんなにグローバル)	November 26, 2011
Jun takes Yachiyo to buy a cellphone, while Kozue takes a liking to Yōhei. Meanwhile, Mitsuki becomes suspicious of Jun's familiarity with Yachiyo while Aoi runs away after Sota scolds her.
10	"Cellphone, No Problem"; Transliteration: "Kētai, Mōmantai" (Japanese: ケータイ無問題)	December 3, 2011
Mahiru finds herself a bit too close to Sōta for comfort when he tries to stop a tower of boxes from falling on her, which leads her to become a bit fearful of him the next day. This turns into a complete freakout after she discovers Sōta touching her head while she was asleep and stops coming to work. Later, Popura gets locked in the freezer and initially suspects Jun, but soon finds Aoi just did it accidentally. After Mahiru doesn't show up at work all week, Sōta goes to visit her in Kotori-guise to apologise and exchange phone numbers.
11	"It's Resolve, Is That a Problem?"; Transliteration: "Ketsui Desu ga, Nani ka?" (Japanese: 決意ですが、何か？)	December 10, 2011
Aoi searches for her teddy bear, Daisy, only to find that Satō had just put it in her room. Later, Yachiyo overhears a conversation between Jun and Mitsuki and assumes the two are going out with each other. As Jun notices Yachiyo's weird behaviour, he takes some advice from Popura to put some pressure on himself to sort things out with Yachiyo.
12	"Daisy Dies"; Transliteration: "Deijī Shisu" (Japanese: デイジー死す)	December 17, 2011
Popura and Aoi try to help Mahiru train to cure her androphobia by dressing her up as a guy, but with no such luck. Later, Sōta and Mahiru start exchanging text messages, which causes Izumi to worry. Sōta also runs into Kirio, who manages to deduce that Mahiru has feelings for him. Later one night, Aoi gets locked out of the restaurant, but Jun manages to sort things out for her. Later, Popura and Aoi try to help out Mahiru's progress by exposing her to the other men, only for her to nearly end up punching Hiroomi. Meanwhile, Popura becomes elated when she is finally able to reach the broken items report sheet that was normally out of her reach.
13	"Farewell, Popura"; Transliteration: "Sayonara, Popura" (Japanese: さよならぽぷら)	December 24, 2011
While Popura is pleased to finally reach the report sheet, Sōta is horrified by the thought of her growing taller. While talking about the future, Aoi ends up turning a statement from Popura that she might have to leave Wagnaria some time in the future to a rumour that she is actually quitting, which she spreads to the other staff members. As the staff have their concerns over this, much to the annoyance of Maya, Popura is confused by their weird reactions to her. After Maya helps Popura with her worries, the truth about Aoi's rumor soon comes out.

=== Working!!! (2015) ===
No.	Title	Original release date
1	"All Quiet on the Wagnaria Front"; Transliteration: "Wagunaria Sensen Ijō Nashi" (Japanese: ワグナリア戦線異状なし)	July 4, 2015
Sōta spends the day looking after the little girl who came before, leading Popura to start feeling a little left out. The next day, Mahiru meets Yamada on her way to work and they search for Yamada's sister (Aoi) together, and Aoi comes across Haruna (Otoo's lost wife), who she sees coincidentally as her potential mother and brings her to Wagnaria. The other staff try to keep Haruna put until Otoo returns, but she somehow manages to escape.
2	"The Night Porter!?"; Transliteration: "Ai no Arashi!?" (Japanese: 愛の嵐!?)	July 11, 2015
Sōta is given the task of reporting his family's activities to Toru Minegishi, Kazue's ex-husband and their mother's employee, who has an annoyingly masochistic behavior. The next day, Sōta has to deal with his poor eyesight after his glasses broke. Hiroomi somehow tries to encourage Jun to ask Yachiyo out for a drink.
3	"The Longest Night"; Transliteration: "Shijō Saidai no Yoru" (Japanese: 史上最大の夜)	July 18, 2015
With their days off coinciding with each other, Jun finally manages to ask Yachiyo out for a drink. Having never gone out drinking before, Yachiyo gets some dubious advice from Kozue. Meanwhile, Aoi tries to get Sōta to rub her head like he inadvertently did the other day. At the end of their night of drinking, Yachiyo is taken aback when Jun suddenly hugs her.
4	"The Hurt Knocker"; Transliteration: "Hāto Nokkā" (Japanese: ハートノッカー)	July 25, 2015
As Yahciyo remains spaced out over the previous day's events, Popura tries to act more reliably to fill in for her, while Mitsuki tests Jun to see how compatible he is with Yachiyo. Meanwhile, Sōta is bewildered over suddenly finding Mahiru to be cute, outright denying Kirio's suggestion that he might be in love with her. While trying to compliment Mahiru on how much she's improved with her androphobia, Sōta inadvertently upsets her by suggesting she find someone else to fall in love with.
5	"Super Bags in the Heart"; Transliteration: "Sūpā Baggu in za Hāto" (Japanese: スーパーバッグ・イン・ザ・ハート)	August 1, 2015
While Sōta remains stressed over the other day's events, Izumi, assuming he had broken up with Popura, tries to set Sōta and Mahiru up with each other, unaware of the actual circumstances between them. As a result, Mahiru meets up with Sōta while wearing a paper bag on the head, bearing her feelings in front of the "stranger" before her until Sōta unmasks her. As things soon start falling into place for him, Sōta starts to get heated up over the thought of Mahiru being in love with him.
6	"Yamada vs. Yamada"; Transliteration: "Yamada, Yāmada" (Japanese: 山田, やーまだ)	August 8, 2015
As Sōta feels conflicted over his feelings towards Mahiru, Aoi, wanting Hiroomi to give her some attention, tries to obtain information on the blossoming relationships. Later, Popura gets a toothache and takes the day off, having a dream where she becomes a magical girl. Meanwhile, Kirio ends up discovering Aoi, who is revealed to be the sister he was searching for, and is met with resistance when he tries to take her back home.
7	"The Goodbye Girl (Yamada)"; Transliteration: "Gubbai Gāru" (Japanese: グッバイ山田(ガール))	August 15, 2015
Staying over at Sōta's house, Aoi explains her backstory about being constantly forced to study by her mother, inevitably pointing out the reason she ran away was because Kirio ate her natto. As the other staff members try to convince Aoi to return home over the next few days, Popura asks Kirio to bring over his mother, Kikuno, who is revealed to have trouble talking with others clearly to the point that her children need a manual to understand her. Conflicted over having never read the manual herself, Aoi runs off and comes across Haruna, who encourages her to get along with her mother. Aoi quickly rekindles with her mother, returning Haruna back to Otoo in the process, and decides to go back home.
8	"Mystic Sugar"; Transliteration: "Misuchikku Shugā" (Japanese: ミスチック・シュガー)	August 22, 2015
With Aoi's situation resolved, Sōta continues to be in denial over his feelings for Mahiru. Meanwhile, having finally learned Yachiyo's birthday, Jun gives her all the presents that he hadn't had the courage to give her before. Later, Aoi gets herself a cellphone, which she attempts to use to communicate with Kikuno, while Popura becomes depressed when she believes she's gotten shorter. Meanwhile, Kirio tries to make himself Hiroomi's little brother in order to recover his status as Aoi's big brother.
9	"Fatal Situation"; Transliteration: "Kiken na Jijō" (Japanese: 危険な事情)	August 29, 2015
As Popura becomes more aware of the relationships blooming around her, she and Aoi question Otoo about the restaurant's stance on romantic relationships. Later, Minegishi comes to the restaurant to tell Sōta something and gets punched by Mahiru, leading her to feel she hasn't gotten over her androphobia, but Sōta manages to calm her down, while the punch itself prompts Minegishi to get back together with Kazue. Afterwards, Sōta becomes fearful when he learns his mother is coming home for the first time in years.
10	"That Woman Shizuka"; Transliteration: "Sono Onna Shizuka" (Japanese: その女シズカ)	September 5, 2015
Mitsuki and Youhei deal with Kozue as she worries about being lonely, eventually giving their support after inadvertently upsetting her. Meanwhile, Sōta's mother, Shizuka, returns home and shows an interest in Sōta's love life, leaving him concerned for Mahiru's safety.
11	"The Love and Reminiscence of Something"; Transliteration: "Ai to Tsuioku no Nanika" (Japanese: 愛と追憶のなにか)	September 12, 2015
Jun finally works up the courage to confess to Yachiyo, but it doesn't go well and Yachiyo goes into hiding. After managing to find her, Jun gives a direct confession which she finally reciprocates. Afterwards, Kyoko seems to want to stop Yachiyo making parfaits for her, saying she shouldn't be tied down to her, but Jun accepts that Kyoko is a key part of the girl he fell in love with. With Kyoko lifting the ban on co-workers dating, Sōta, feeling he needs to come to some conclusion about Mahiru, starts crossdressing as Kotori again to try and understand when things changed between them.
12	"Working Girl?"; Transliteration: "Wākingu Gāru?" (Japanese: ワーキング・ガール?)	September 19, 2015
Still dressed as Kotori, Sōta gets some surprisingly sound love advice from Kirio, who instantly sees through his disguise. Meanwhile, Sōta and Jun become curious about how Hiroomi hasn't been snooping into people's businesses lately, only to find he has simply been more secretive about it. Later, Yachiyo tells Popura that she plans to quit Wagnaria to expand her horizons, assigning her as the next chief. After being told by Popura to confront his problem, Sōta asks Mahiru about which form he prefers, ultimately deciding to stop cross-dressing and ask her out on a date.
13	"Midday Duel"; Transliteration: "Mahiru no Kessen" (Japanese: まひるの決戦)	September 26, 2015
Aoi, curious about Sōta's delayed reactions, is tasked by Yachiyo with taking a photo of Hiroomi for an album. Meanwhile, as Sōta and Mahiru go on their date, they are interrupted by Mahiru's father, who Mahiru hits when he starts insulting Sōta, managing to work things out with him. Later, Yachiyo announces her resignation to the rest of the staff, with Sōta encouraging Popura to do her best as the next chief before being mysteriously abducted.
14	"Lord of the Takanashi"; Transliteration: "Rōdo obu za Takanashi" (Japanese: ロード・オブ・ザ・小鳥遊)	December 26, 2015
As Sōta stops showing up at work, Kyoko learns that he has been spending a lot more time crossdressing because of his mother. Worried she is the cause of her problem, Mahiru confronts Sōta and tells him how she thinks of her, but Shizuka catches him and forces him to quit working at Wagnaria. Learning from Kyoko that Shizuka is having Sōta crossdress until he learns to be honest about his feelings, Mahiru heads off to talk with Shizuka, having to confront each of the Takanashi sisters along the way. As Mahiru confronts Shizuka with help from Nazuna, Popura shows up and convinces Shizuka to let Sōta keep working. Afterwards, Shizuka returns to her work while Sōta and Mahiru finally confess to each other.

=== WWW.Working!! (2016) ===
No.	Title	Original release date
1	"Part-Time Jobs Can Change Lives"; Transliteration: "Arubaito wa Jinsei o Kaete Kureru" (Japanese: アルバイトは人生を変えてくれる)	October 1, 2016
High school student Daisuke Higashida reluctantly takes up a part-time job at Wagnaria after his father's company goes bankrupt. Daisuke begins training under floor chief Hana Miyakoshi, who is rather harsh towards dimwitted manager Kenichiro Sakaki, also meeting the other staff members; Sayuri Muranushi, who can see ghosts but refuses to believe in them. Kisaki Kondou, a former delinquent who rarely does any work, Shiho Kamakura, a rich girl who refers to customers as "the common masses" and uses her money to avoid having to apologize. Masahiro Adachi and Takuya Kouno, who both work in the kitchen, and Yuuta Shindou, who is frequently tormented by Kamakura as his father owes a large debt to her father. Daisuke becomes irritated when his family come to the restaurant and he is forced to pay for their meals. Later, Daisuke is manipulated into eating Hana's Valentine's Day chocolate, which, according to legend, is so disgusting that St. Valentine himself comes down from heaven to visit the victim. Despite nearly dying and even meeting St. Valentine Daisuke insists on eating all the chocolates like he promised.
2	"Life Isn't That Easy"; Transliteration: "Jinsei Sonna ni Amakunai" (Japanese: 人生そんなに甘くない)	October 8, 2016
Miyakoshi asks Daisuke to tutor her as her mother is threatening to make her quit if she gets bad grades. Kisaki starts bringing her baby daughter, Hime, to work. Sakaki is punished by Miyakoshi after hiring Kouki Saiki, who can only speak English. Kisaki decides to train him, as only she can speak English. Daisuke tutors Miyakoshi at his house. Miyakoshi reveals her mother, Youko, is a TV chef, and she plans to take over her job, despite being a terrible cook. Muranushi is unpopular with customers as she always appears gloomy, but when she does smile Adachi is left traumatised. Shindou reveals to Kisaki that he was friends with Kamakura in kindergarten and she offered to clear his family debt by marrying him when they grew up, but he turned her down, resulting in her tormenting him ever since. Kisaki suggests he apologize so Shindou almost asks Kamakura to marry him, but he chickens out. Miyakoshi fails at studying and cries, causing Daisuke's father to misunderstand and lose respect for him as a man. Kisaki teaches Saiki some questionable Japanese phrases while Kouno is worried Adachi is still not himself after Muranushi smiled at him. In the end Miyakoshi fails after studying all night causes her to fall asleep during the exam, though her mother lets her keep working anyway.
3	"You're the Only One I Can Ask"; Transliteration: "Kimi ni Shika Tanomenai" (Japanese: 君にしか頼めない)	October 15, 2016
Daisuke suspects a new customer, Miri Yanagiba, might be a ghost. Muranushi insists she is not, though she is the granddaughter of the old man who visits every day, who is definitely a ghost. Daisuke learns Yanagiba was supposed to attend his school but after missing her chance to make friends she became a truant. Daisuke plans to introduce her to Rui Nagata, a girl in his class, so she can be her friend. During the Wagnaria staff's test of courage Muranushi is upset Adachi appears scared of her, but when she smiles at him again it causes him to run away, though he comes back for her after learning a bear might be nearby. Daisuke learns Miyakoshi's father does not live with them anymore because his wife's cooking gave him diabetes and she will not let him come home until he recovers. Shindou tries to apologize to Kamakura, hoping they can be friends again, though this upsets her more, making her even crueler. Miyakoshi finds the bear is actually a raccoon and decides to adopt it, though as she cannot have pets in her flat she forces Daisuke to take it instead. The next day Nagata, who has a crush on Daisuke, sees him with Miyakoshi and assumes they are dating. Yanagiba meets Nagata and decides she has friendship potential. Meanwhile, Daisuke's confusing description of Miyakoshi's raccoon leads Nagata to believe he and Miyakoshi conceived a baby.
4	"I Have a Feeling It'll Go Well"; Transliteration: "Ikeru Kiga Suru" (Japanese: いけるきがする)	October 22, 2016
Shindou becomes depressed after Kamakura torments him worse than usual. Kouno suspects Adachi is in love with Muranushi. Meanwhile, Muranushi suspects Daisuke likes Miyakoshi since he acts differently around her. Miyakoshi refuses to believe her chocolate changed his personality. Her mother, Youko, visits Wagnaria, having mixed up the date of her husband's birthday, revealing that while she pretends not to care, she misses him. After learning Daisuke is the one who survived Miyakoshi's chocolate she offers to let him marry Miyakoshi to make up for the damage to his personality, but he refuses. Youko even sends Miyakoshi to his house in the early morning, as part of her marriage apology plan. As Daisuke walks her home they stop to make wishes at a shrine where Nagata, after misunderstanding their wishes, becomes further convinced they are dating in secret. Miyakoshi decides to make chocolate again. Nagata plans to give Daisuke chocolate. Muranushi gives Adachi chocolate but leaves him confused about what it means. Kamakura gives Shindou dog food. Miyakoshi gives Daisuke chocolate, but it is so bad he passes out and meets St. Valentine again. St. Valentine has decided to help Daisuke, but as it is not yet Valentine's Day he simply tells him to "do his best". Nagata decides not to give Daisuke her chocolate, so Yanagiba does it instead, shocking Daisuke that it tastes of actual chocolate, and annoying Miyakoshi.
5	"I'll Try Getting Revenge"; Transliteration: "Fukushū Shite Miru" (Japanese: ふくしゅうしてみる)	October 29, 2016
The staff notices that Daisuke's personality has gotten worse after Miyakoshi's latest chocolate disaster. Daisuke takes an interest in the manager, Sakaki, who is still employed despite his incompetence and appears to have a lot of spare money. One of Kamakura's bodyguards, Tasaka, who is actually employed to keep Kamakura from killing Shindou, reveals that Sakaki was a delinquent famous for fighting with his cat on his head. Sakaki insists his reputation was exaggerated by rumors, but even today gangs still bribe him not to join their rival gangs, explaining his extra cash. Adachi accidentally upsets Muranushi, who threatens to smile at him. Kamakura buys a katana to threaten Shindou with but almost murders Saiki after he accidentally tells her to be more honest about her feelings for Shindou. Muranushi's mother, who works as an exorcist, visits Wagnaria and warns Adachi that Saitou, the last boy Muranushi smiled at, never recovered. After talking to Nagata Miyakoshi is confused as to why she wants to give Daisuke chocolate when normally people only give chocolate to people they like. After much confusion, Miyakoshi decides to keep giving Daisuke chocolate until it returns his personality to normal and asks Nagata to teach her, and Nagata agrees, despite thinking of Miyakoshi as her romantic rival. Daisuke is warned by Muranushi's mother to take care not to become a victim in the near future.
6	"Fate Survival"; Transliteration: "Unmei Sabaibaru" (Japanese: 運命サバイバル)	November 5, 2016
Valentine's Day has come again. Kamakura gifts Shindou dozens of losing lottery tickets. Muranushi gives Adachi chocolates she made, though he passes out from shock. Miyakoshi gives Daisuke chocolate Nagata helped her make, but it is still so bad he meets St. Valentine who explains that food tastes good if it contains love, so Daisuke will only survive if he loves Miyakoshi. This makes Daisuke cry but when he wakes up his personality has become cheerful and he tells Miyakoshi he wants her to stay a terrible cook. Shindou finds one ticket worth 300 yen which makes him happy so Kamakura goes back to threatening him with her katana. Adachi upsets Muranushi again so he promises to stop being scared of her, and even manages not to faint when she smiles at him. Miyakoshi decides to abandon chocolate and start cooking other things. Kamakura gets a new bodyguard who turns out to be Saitou, the boy who Muranushi once smiled at and never recovered. He is scolded by Kamakura for pretending to hate Muranushi when he actually has a crush on her, but when she realises this is like her own relationship with Shindou she punishes Saitou by forcing him to spend time around Muranushi. Miyakoshi declares she will cook for Daisuke more often, which he confusingly refuses in case her cooking improves and he starts to love her. In the end they agree they definitely don't like each other, leaving the staff confused.
7	"Cooking is Love"; Transliteration: "Ryōri wa Aijō" (Japanese: 料理は愛情)	November 12, 2016
Kamakura continues to torment Shindou. The financially savvy baby Hime gives Shindou lottery tickets she was playing with, only for Shindou to discover a ticket worth 300 million yen, enough to pay his entire debt. He is surprised when this makes Kamakura cry while he feels no relief. Deciding he would rather pay his debt himself he tries to give the ticket back to Kisaki, but she refuses. Saitou suggests that Kamakura use the opportunity to be honest with Shindou about her feelings, but she refuses. Shindou gives the ticket to Kouno, who discovers the ticket was expired. Shindou tells Kamakura he has decided to stay in debt so she doesn't have to be upset. Kamakura becomes flustered and reduces his debt, but only by 500 yen. Daisuke continues to refuse Miyakoshi's cooking so she eats the chocolate herself, faints, and meets St. Valentine. To bring her back Daisuke also eats the chocolate and finds Miyakoshi punishing the unfortunate St. Valentine, who accidentally reveals to Miyakoshi all the previous advice he gave to Daisuke about trying to love her, earning Daisuke's wrath as well. As they both wake up they are comically scolded by Nagata for three hours for risking their lives. Daisuke later notices Miyakoshi acting strangely. Kamakura returns to bullying Shindou, though not as harshly as before.
8	"Funny Story"; Transliteration: "Okashi na Hanashi" (Japanese: おかしなはなし)	November 19, 2016
With St. Valentine telling her love would improve her cooking Miyakoshi asks Daisuke to date her. Daisuke agrees, but only to prove what a bad match they are so she will break up with him. The news devastates Nagata but when Daisuke explains he is only dating Miyakoshi so she will break up with him Nagata scolds him for being a bad boyfriend. Daisuke takes Miyakoshi to an arcade and wins her a stuffed bear, though this does not really impress her. After two weeks of dating Miyakoshi worries her cooking has not improved while Daisuke is depressed at always paying for their dates. Miyakoshi asks if they should kiss, causing Daisuke to run away and forcing Miyakoshi to call her mother to pay their restaurant bill. Daisuke apologises but runs away again when she tries to give him more chocolate. Miyakoshi suggests Muranushi date Adachi, but Muranushi is insulted when Adachi panics and turns her down before she could even ask him. Adachi tries to fix his mistake by admitting he likes Muranushi but ends up upsetting her even more, leaving him unsure of how to apologise. Trying to consider his feelings Miyakoshi buys Daisuke chocolate from a shop, avoiding poisoning him but misunderstanding the point of trying to improve her cooking. Daisuke eats the chocolate but is confused that it appears tasteless and bland.
9	"We're All Illing"; Transliteration: "Bokura wa Minna Yandeiru" (Japanese: 僕らはみんな病んでいる)	November 26, 2016
Muranushi becomes ill and her absence upsets the old man's ghost who visits her every day, causing him to begin haunting Wagnaria. Adachi feels guilty at upsetting Muranushi and causing her to become ill so he decides to visit her home and apologise again with shop sweets he got from Miyakoshi. After he sees how ill she is he insists they go to the doctor, though she refuses after getting upset at her mother. Unsure how to get her to visit the doctor or really express his feelings Adachi asks Muranushi to be his girlfriend and she agrees, though she is unimpressed at his poor timing. Yanagiba also falls ill so Daisuke tricks Nagata into looking after her. Yanagiba becomes depressed and she eventually admits that she feels Nagata is only looking after her because Daisuke asked her and that now Daisuke is dating Miyakoshi Nagata might stop visiting her at Wagnaria. Miyakoshi tries to get along with Saiki but always becomes confused trying to overcome the language barrier. Nagata manages to assure Yanagiba she really is her friend and they make up while discussing Daisuke and Miyakoshi's odd relationship. Muranushi's mother decides to eat Miyakoshi's sweets, but only after exorcising them first.
10	"Howl at Tomorrow"; Transliteration: "Ashita ni Mukatte Hoero" (Japanese: 明日に向かって吼えろ)	December 3, 2016
Miyakoshi continues to enjoy herself with Daisuke always paying for dates but admits she sometimes feels guilty. Shindou remembers that his father had told him to marry Kamakura so his gambling debt would be cancelled. This caused him to turn down Kamakura's offer of marriage on principle. Kisaki suggests Kamakura liked him more when he had an attitude so Shindou practices being arrogant by shouting Kamakura's name, but this only makes her beat him up, though she does become depressed afterward. Tasaka and Saitou plan to cure her depression by convincing her that beating up Shindou shocked his brain into reverting to his old personality, and Kamakura becomes so happy she cries. Shindou manages to explain that the debt made him feel like they couldn't be equals and he hopes they can return to their old relationship once the debt is paid. He almost kisses her, causing Tasaka and Saitou to intervene, revealing the deception but curing Kamakura's depression. A few days later Kamakura uneasily demands Shindou repay the debt as fast as possible. Shindou explains to Kisaki the debt is his father's, but his father disappeared. Kisaki suggests finding his father and forcing him to pay it instead. Later, on his way home Shindou coincidentally bumps into his father, who still wants him to marry Kamakura for the money. After beating his dad up Shindou demands he come home so his mom won't worry anymore.
11	"If Someone Hits You on the Right Cheek, Counter With Your Left Fist"; Transliteration: "Migi no Hō o Naguraretara Sawan de Kauntā" (Japanese: 右の頬を殴られたら左腕でカウンター)	December 10, 2016
Muranushi and Kisaki try to tell Miyakoshi to consider Daisuke's feelings. Daisuke asks why Miyakoshi never pays for dates and she admits she forgot her ATM number and relies on money from her mother. Miyakoshi announces she will be sleeping at Daisuke's house, after which Daisuke learns his family will be absent meaning he and Miyakoshi will be "alone together". However, Miyakoshi reveals her actual plan, to eat chocolate and get advice from St. Valentine. Valentine tells her to think about what would make Daisuke happy, as well as explaining sex. Daisuke arrives to get her but Miyakoshi realises the only way for Daisuke to get there was the chocolate in her mouth, meaning he kissed her, so she runs away. Daisuke admits to Valentine he didn't kiss her, he ate old chocolate hidden in his room. Miyakoshi becomes upset that she might have stolen Daisuke's first kiss. Daisuke apologises for hiding her chocolate, while she thinks he is apologising about the kiss, making her feel worse. Miyakoshi later tries to apologise for stealing his kiss and gives him her bank book as repayment for all the dates and in her panicked state almost "gives herself to him", with Daisuke only being saved by Adachi. Daisuke manages to explain there was no kiss, for which Miyakoshi is relieved. She then demands another date but insists he keep the bank book as she is paying.
12	"The Something Before the Storm"; Transliteration: "Arashi no Mae no Nanika" (Japanese: あらしの前の何か)	December 17, 2016
Everyone at Wagnaria begins acting strangely due to all the romantic problems. Kamakura worries Shindou may never pay his debt and lashes out at him. Adachi asks Muranushi on a date but suspects she is going to break up with him, though it turns out Muranushi thought he wanted to break up with her. She is relieved to learn he was confused over seeing Miyakoshi almost "give herself" to Daisuke and she smiles, though this time it doesn't scare him. Adachi suddenly kisses her, apologises, then runs home. The next day Adachi worries the kiss upset her after she starts carrying a knife. Shindou's father is caught by Saitou, making Kamakura happy as Shindou is now free of the debt, but when Shindou decides to stay loyal to his father she madly announces she will abandon her family, even though her father will most likely blame Shindou and his father and have them assassinated. With the debt no longer Shindou's responsibility Kamakura confesses she loves him and, despite his suffering, Shindou admits he loves her too and kisses her forehead, promising to kiss her properly later. Kamakura's father forces Shindou's father to start working as a tuna fisherman. His father later turns up and explains he turned out to be a good fisherman and earned a small fortune, which he then lost through gambling. Shindou beats him up and threatens him to pay the debt quickly as he now has an important reason to see it paid off so he can date Kamakura properly.
13	"There's a Reason for Everything"; Transliteration: "Subete no Koto Niwa Riyū ga Aru" (Japanese: 全てのことには理由がある)	December 24, 2016
Daisuke dismisses Miyakoshi's worries about sex, assuring her they can continue trying to improve her cooking and nothing else. Miyakoshi becomes unexpectedly enthusiastic about cooking to make Daisuke happy but tries so hard her kitchen emits a disturbing miasma. Daisuke surprisingly orders her to make chocolate again, and while it is disgusting, he does not meet St. Valentine. Valentine instead appears with the news that their consideration of each other's feelings has worked a romantic miracle and they no longer need him. Six months later Shindou has quit Wagnaria and now works in construction. Kamakura returned home but remains a devoted girlfriend to Shindou, though her bodyguards are now employed to stop them getting too romantic, until the debt is fully paid. Adachi tells Muranushi he is quitting Wagnaria to start work at his family's Sushi restaurant, upsetting her, until he asks her to work with him at the restaurant and move into his house, and maybe propose to her once he is a success. Muranushi agrees. Baby Hime moves on from lottery tickets and starts making a fortune on investments. The miasma from Miyakoshi's kitchen distresses her mother so much she calls her husband, they end up reconciling and he moves back into the house. Daisuke suddenly breaks up with Miyakoshi but immediately asks her out again, starting their relationship over based on their mutual attraction, not her terrible cooking. The episode ends with all the couples happily moving forward while Miyakoshi bids the audience farewell, until next time.
