= Mr. CB =

Japanese manga series

- First tankōbon volume cover
- Genre: Sports
- Manga
- Written by: Masaya Tsunamoto
- Illustrated by: Isao Tanishima
- Published by: Akita Shoten
- Imprint: Young Champion Comics
- Magazine: Young Champion
- Original run: May 8, 2018 – present
- Volumes: 18

Mr. CB is a Japanese manga series written by Masaya Tsunamoto and illustrated by Isao Tanishima. It began serialization on Akita Shoten's seinen manga magazine Young Champion in May 2018.

== Synopsis ==
The series is centered around a newly-established third division football team named Tokyo Wanders, whose ambition is to get promoted to the J League in three years. Mamoru Yoshinaga, a footballer with experience in Germany, declared in his interview after signing for the club that the team would be promoted to the J League in three years. After three years, the team remains in the third division. Yoshinaga later discovers Akira Chigira and identifies his talent as a center-back. Yoshinaga forfeits his signing bonus in order for the team to Chigira into team.

== Publication ==
Written by Masaya Tsunamoto and illustrated by Isao Tanishima, Mr. CB began serialization in Akita Shoten's seinen manga magazine Young Champion on May 8, 2018. Its chapters have been compiled into eighteen tankōbon volumes as of June 2026.

No.	Release date	ISBN
1	February 20, 2019	978-4-253-14957-0
2	March 19, 2019	978-4-253-14958-7
3	August 20, 2019	978-4-253-14959-4
4	February 20, 2020	978-4-253-14960-0
5	August 20, 2020	978-4-253-14963-1
6	December 18, 2020	978-4-253-30371-2
7	May 20, 2021	978-4-253-30372-9
8	November 18, 2021	978-4-253-30373-6
9	April 20, 2022	978-4-253-30374-3
10	September 20, 2022	978-4-253-30375-0
11	February 20, 2023	978-4-253-30376-7
12	July 20, 2023	978-4-253-30377-4
13	December 20, 2023	978-4-253-30378-1
14	April 18, 2024	978-4-253-30379-8
15	September 19, 2024	978-4-253-30380-4
16	May 20, 2025	978-4-253-30381-1
17	January 20, 2026	978-4-253-01001-6
18	June 19, 2026	978-4-253-01763-3

== Reception ==
The series was included in Honya Club's Nationwide Bookstore Employees' Top 3 Sports Manga of 2020.

== See also ==
- Giant Killing, another manga series by the same writer
