= Black Joke (manga) =

Manga series (2008–2022)

- Sixth tankōbon volume cover

ブラック・ジョーク (Burakku Jōku)
- Genre: Action, comedy
- Manga
- Written by: Rintaro Koike
- Illustrated by: Masayuki Taguchi
- Published by: Akita Shoten
- Magazine: Young Champion; (2008–2011); Young Champion Retsu; (2011–2022)
- Original run: February 12, 2008 – November 15, 2022
- Volumes: 11

Black Joke (Japanese: ブラック・ジョーク, Hepburn: Burakku Jōku) is a Japanese manga series written by Rintaro Koike and illustrated by Masayuki Taguchi. It was serialized in Akita Shoten's seinen manga magazines Young Champion (2008–2011) and Young Champion Retsu (2011–2022), with its chapters collected in eleven tankōbon volumes.

The series is set in a fictional world where Japan is the 51st state of the United States, and an artificial island in Tokyo Bay known as Neon Island is the only place in American territory where gambling and prostitution are legal. Neon Island is home to many members of numerous mafia organizations. The story centers on Kira Kiyoshi, an ex-Marine and manager of the Onsen Hotel on Neon Island, as well as a member of the only Japanese mafia on the island.

== Publication ==
Written by Rintaro Koike and illustrated by Masayuki Taguchi, Black Joke was serialized in Akita Shoten's seinen manga magazine Young Champion from February 12, 2008, to March 8, 2011. The series was later transferred to Young Champion Retsu, where it ran from May 17, 2011, to November 15, 2022. Akita Shoten collected its chapters in eleven tankōbon volumes, released from September 19, 2008, to January 20, 2023.

=== Volume list ===
No.	Release date	ISBN
1	September 19, 2008	978-4-253-14793-4
2	April 20, 2009	978-4-253-14794-1
3	December 18, 2009	978-4-253-14795-8
4	June 18, 2010	978-4-253-14796-5
5	March 18, 2011	978-4-253-14799-6
6	November 18, 2011	978-4-253-14800-9
7	June 20, 2012	978-4-253-14935-8
8	April 19, 2013	978-4-253-14936-5
9	August 20, 2014	978-4-253-14937-2
10	July 20, 2020	978-4-253-14940-2
11	January 20, 2023	978-4-253-30011-7
