= Ibitsu =

Japanese manga series by Kazuto Okada

いびつ
- Manga
- Written by: Kazuto Okada
- Published by: Akita Shoten
- Magazine: Young Champion
- Original run: August 20, 2010 – March 19, 2013
- Volumes: 7
- Live-action film
- Directed by: Toshiyuki Morioka
- Released: February 2, 2013
- Runtime: 80 minutes

Ibitsu (Japanese: いびつ; lit. 'Warped') is a Japanese manga series written and illustrated by Kazuto Okada. It was adapted into a live action film in 2013.

== Characters ==
- Madoka Moritaka
- Keigo Kakiguchi

== See also ==
- Sundome, another manga series by the same author
