= Hitoshi Tomizawa =

Japanese manga artist

- Notable works: Alien Nine

Hitoshi Tomizawa (富沢ひとし, Tomizawa Hitoshi) is a Japanese manga artist. He is best known for his sci-fi series Alien Nine.

== Career ==
Tomizawa worked as an assistant to Baki the Grappler author Keisuke Itagaki, before publishing his first work as a professional manga artist with the series Uchū Jūbe in the magazine Shōnen Champion.

== Style and themes ==
His manga tend to be short, with sci-fi stories involving children and insects. His art was a fairly standard style for his first series, but starting with Alien 9 it became very distinctive, but with very large eyes and unnatural proportions, and has since been featured in exhibitions including Takashi Murakami's superflat. In a short interview included within Alien 9's English-translated tankōbon, he has cited Yoshiyuki Tomino, Mamoru Oshii, Katsuhiro Otomo, and science fiction authors Larry Niven and Robert Heinlein as influences of his.

== Works ==
- Treasure Hunter (肥前屋兵衛, Uchū Jūbe) (serialized in Weekly Shōnen Champion, 1994–1995)
- Alien Nine (エイリアン9) (serialized in Young Champion, 1998–1999)
- Milk Closet (ミルククローゼット) (serialized in Monthly Afternoon, 2000–2001)
- Propeller Heaven (プロペラ天国, Puropera Tengoku) (serialized in Ultra Jump, 2000–2001)
- Alien Nine Emulators (エイリアン9 エミュレイターズ) (serialized in Champion Red, 2002)
- Radio Depart (ラジオデパート) (one-shot in Afternoon Season Zōkan, 2002)
- Battle Royale II: Blitz Royale (BR2/ブリッツ・ロワイアル) (serialized in Young Champion, 2003–2004, based on Koushun Takami)
- Tokumu Hōkōkan Yumihari (特務咆哮艦ユミハリ) (serialized in Genzo, 2004–2007)
- Yume Nikki (ゆめにっき) (serialized in Manga Life Win, 2013–2014)
- Alien 9 Next (エイリアン9ネクスト) (self-published, 2015–2016)
