= Jingi (manga) =

Japanese manga series

- Cover of the first volume
- Manga
- Written by: Ayumi Tachihara
- Published by: Akita Shoten
- Magazine: Young Champion
- Original run: 1988 – 2002
- Volumes: 33
Further information
Manga
JingiS
Written by	Ayumi Tachihara
Published by	Akita Shoten
Magazine	Young Champion
Original run	2006 – 2012
Volumes	19
Manga
Jingi Zero
Written by	Ayumi Tachihara
Published by	Akita Shoten
Magazine	Young Champion
Original run	2012 – October 30, 2017
Volumes	14
Manga
Jingi Before and Jingi After
Written by	Ayumi Tachihara
Published by	Akita Shoten
Magazine	Young Champion
Published	January 30, 2020
Adaptations
2 OVA episodes (1991–1992); Live-action film (1991)

Jingi (stylized in all caps) is a Japanese manga series written and illustrated by Ayumi Tachihara. It was serialized in Akita Shoten's Young Champion from 1998 to 2002 and published in 33 volumes. A sequel, titled JingiS, was serialized in Young Champion from 2006 to 2012 and published in 19 volumes. Another sequel, titled Jingi Zero, was serialized in Young Champion from 2012 to October 2017. Two spin-offs, titled Jingi Before and Jingi After, were published in Young Champion in January 2020. The series has been adapted into two OVAs and a live-action film.

== Summary ==
The series centers around Jin, a hitman, and Yoshiro, a former far-left terrorist, who meet by chance and together rise through the ranks of yakuza society.

== Media ==
=== Manga ===
Written and illustrated by Ayumi Tachihara, the series was serialized in Akita Shoten's Young Champion magazine from 1998 to 2002. Its individual chapters were collected into 33 tankōbon volumes. A sequel series, titled JingiS, was serialized in Young Champion from 2006 to 2012. Its individual chapters were collected into 19 tankōbon volumes. Another sequel series, titled Jingi Zero, was serialized in Young Champion from 2012 to October 30, 2017. Its individual chapters were collected into 14 tankōbon volumes.

Two spin-offs, Jingi Before and Jingi After, were published in Young Champion on January 20, 2020.

=== Adaptations ===
A two-episode original video animation adaptation of the manga was released from 1991 to 1992.

A live-action film adaptation, directed by Keiji Hasegawa and starring Tsuyoshi Ihara and Riki Takeuchi, was released by the Toei Company in Japan in 1991.

== Reception ==
The series and its sequels combined have 30 million copies in circulation.
