= Giant Killing =

Japanese manga series

- First tankōbon volume cover, featuring Takeshi Tatsumi
- Genre: Drama; Sports
- Manga
- Written by: Masaya Tsunamoto
- Illustrated by: Tsujitomo
- Published by: Kodansha
- English publisher: NA: Kodansha USA (digital)
- Imprint: Morning KC
- Magazine: Morning
- Original run: January 11, 2007 – present
- Volumes: 71
- Anime television series
- Directed by: Yuu Kou
- Produced by: Atsuya Hirooka; Yuji Shibata
- Written by: Toshifumi Kawase
- Music by: Hideharu Mori
- Studio: Studio Deen
- Original network: NHK General TV
- Original run: April 4, 2010 – September 26, 2010
- Episodes: 26
- icon

Giant Killing (stylized in all caps) is a Japanese manga series written by Masaya Tsunamoto and illustrated by Tsujitomo. It has been serialized in Kodansha's seinen manga magazine Morning since January 2007. A 26-episode anime television series adaptation was broadcast on NHK General TV from April to September 2010.

In 2010, Giant Killing won the 34th Kodansha Manga Award in the general category.

== Plot ==
East Tokyo United, ETU, has been struggling in Japan's top football league for a few years. It has taken everything they have just to avoid relegation. To make matters even worse, the fans are starting to abandon the team. In an effort to improve their performance, ETU has hired a new coach, the slightly eccentric Tatsumi Takeshi. Tatsumi, who was considered a great football player when he was younger, abandoned the team years before but has proven himself as the manager of one of England's lower division amateur teams. The task won't be easy, the teams East Tokyo United is pitted against have bigger budgets and better players. However, Tatsumi is an expert at Giant Killing. ETU home stadium in this manga was modeled on Hitachi Kashiwa Soccer Stadium, while the team appears to have been inspired by Tokyo Verdy, which has faced a similar riches-to-rags trajectory in the J. League.

== Characters ==
Takeshi Tatsumi (達海 猛, Tatsumi Takeshi)
Voiced by: Tomokazu Seki
Former East Tokyo United star and member of the Japan national football team, he transfers to a foreign club after a successful spell at ETU. After retirement as a player, Tatsumi coaches FC Eastham, an English Division 5 amateur team, into the fourth round of the FA Cup. Following his success with Eastham, the thirty-five-year-old is convinced by ex-teammate Gotoh, now GM at East Tokyo United, to return to Japan and coach the team where he spent his years as a player. While his somewhat eccentric management decisions are usually contested by the board and supporters, they start to bear fruit as ETU makes themselves a viable contender again.
Shigeyuki Murakoshi (村越 茂幸, Murakoshi Shigeyuki)
Voiced by: Ryotaro Okiayu
Plays Defensive Midfield for East Tokyo United, and is the team captain. He joined ETU as a promising talent in the hopes of playing with then-ETU star Tatsumi, but his dreams were crushed when Tatsumi left for Europe the following season. He is known as "Mr. ETU" throughout the storyline because of his loyalty and dedication to the club, even during the seasons it spent relegated in J2.
Daisuke Tsubaki (椿 大介, Tsubaki Daisuke)
Voiced by: Takahiro Mizushima
Plays Midfield for East Tokyo United. At twenty years old, he was promoted from ETU's reserve team to ETU's "A" team by Tatsumi. He is a very fast runner and is able to stretch opposition defences. Lacking self-confidence, Tsubaki has doubts about his ability to help the team, however Tatsumi encourages him because if he lets his talent show, it will more than compensate for the mistakes he makes.
Luigi Yoshida (ルイジ 吉田, Yoshida Luigi)
Voiced by: Daisuke Ono
Plays Midfield for East Tokyo United. Of half-Japanese and half-Italian descent; known as the "Prince" among ETU teammates because of his ingenious playmaking ability and his often narcissistic attitude, the latter of which leads him to have a lackadaisical approach to the game; this, however, makes him an asset in taking set pieces, because his indifferent look makes him enigmatic enough that opponents have a hard time reading him.
Kazuki Kuroda (黒田 一樹, Kuroda Kazuki)
Voiced by: Kentarō Itō
Plays defense center back for East Tokyo United. Kuroda had problems working with Tatsumi when he first started as manager, prompting him to ask for a transfer to another club. In this time he is able to reflect with fellow defender Sugie on how it is they who need to change and not Tatsumi.
Yusaku Sugie (杉江 勇作, Sugie Yusaku)
Voiced by: Daisuke Kirii
Plays defense center back for East Tokyo United. He is loyal to Kuroda and skipped practice with him so they could reflect on the state of the team and how they were playing.
Hiroshi Midorikawa (緑川 宏, Midorikawa Hiroshi)
The goal keeper for East Tokyo United. One of the older members of the team, he gives advice to Kuroda and Sugie to help them become better defenders.
Yuri Nagata (永田有里, Nagata Yuri)
Voiced by: Masumi Asano
Daughter of ETU's President Nagata, and PR Manager for the club. Was a big fan of ETU and Tatsumi during his player years, and sets off for England alongside GM Gotoh to convince Tatsumi to return to Japan as coach of ETU.

== Media ==
=== Manga ===
Giant Killin, written by Masaya Tsunamoto and illustrated by Tsujitomo, has been serialized in Kodansha's seinen manga magazine Morning since January 11, 2007. The series went on hiatus is September 2016, and resumed publication in January 2017. Kodansha has collected its chapters into individual tankōbon volumes. The first volume was published on April 23, 2007. As of November 20, 2026, seventy-one volumes have been released.

Kodansha USA are publishing the manga in English in a digital format.

==== Volumes ====
No.	Original release date	Original ISBN	English release date	English ISBN
1	April 23, 2007	978-4-06-372593-3	March 7, 2017	978-1-68233-486-7
1–7
2	July 23, 2007	978-4-06-372618-3	June 27, 2017	978-1-68233-487-4
8–17
3	October 23, 2007	978-4-06-372637-4	July 25, 2017	978-1-68233-488-1
18–27
4	January 23, 2008	978-4-06-372660-2	August 15, 2017	978-1-68233-587-1
28–37
5	April 23, 2008	978-4-06-372682-4	August 29, 2017	978-1-68233-588-8
38–47
6	July 23, 2008	978-4-06-372716-6	September 26, 2017	978-1-68233-871-1
48–57
7	October 23, 2008	978-4-06-372740-1	October 31, 2017	978-1-68233-893-3
58–67
8	November 21, 2008	978-4-06-372753-1	November 28, 2017	978-1-68233-980-0
68–77
9	January 23, 2009	978-4-06-372769-2	December 26, 2017	978-1-68233-981-7
78–87
10	April 23, 2009	978-4-06-372789-0	January 30, 2018	978-1-64212-013-4
88–97
11	July 23, 2009	978-4-06-372818-7	March 20, 2018	978-1-64212-158-2
98–107
12	October 23, 2009	978-4-06-372840-8	April 17, 2018	978-1-64212-185-8
108–117
13	January 22, 2010	978-4-06-372868-2	August 21, 2018	978-1-64212-389-0
118–127
14	April 23, 2010	978-4-06-372897-2	October 16, 2018	978-1-64212-484-2
128–137
15	May 21, 2010	978-4-06-372904-7	December 18, 2018	978-1-64212-602-0
138–147
16	July 23, 2010	978-4-06-372918-4	September 10, 2019	978-1-64659-014-8
148–157
17	October 22, 2010	978-4-06-372950-4	November 12, 2019	978-1-64659-119-0
158–167
18	January 21, 2011	978-4-06-372972-6	January 14, 2020	978-1-64659-203-6
168–177
19	April 22, 2011	978-4-06-372992-4	March 10, 2020	978-1-64659-254-8
178–187
20	July 22, 2011	978-4-06-387023-7	May 12, 2020	978-1-64659-357-6
188–197
21	October 22, 2011	978-4-06-387047-3	July 14, 2020	978-1-64659-591-4
198–207
22	January 23, 2012	978-4-06-387074-9	September 8, 2020	978-1-64659-691-1
208–217
23	April 23, 2012	978-4-06-387098-5	November 10, 2020	978-1-64659-797-0
218–227
24	July 23, 2012	978-4-06-387127-2	July 13, 2021	978-1-63699-223-5
228–237
25	October 23, 2012	978-4-06-387148-7	August 10, 2021	978-1-63699-295-2
238–247
26	January 23, 2013	978-4-06-387178-4	September 14, 2021	978-1-63699-355-3
248–257
27	April 23, 2013	978-4-06-387206-4	October 12, 2021	978-1-63699-407-9
258–267
28	July 23, 2013	978-4-06-387228-6	December 14, 2021	978-1-63699-484-0
268–277
29	October 23, 2013	978-4-06-387262-0	February 8, 2022	978-1-63699-515-1
278–287
30	January 23, 2014	978-4-06-387284-2	April 12, 2022	978-1-68491-119-6
288–297
31	April 23, 2014	978-4-06-388323-7	June 14, 2022	978-1-68491-212-4
298–307
32	July 23, 2014	978-4-06-388350-3	August 9, 2022	978-1-68491-384-8
308–317
33	October 23, 2014	978-4-06-388381-7	October 11, 2022	978-1-68491-476-0
318–327
34	January 23, 2015	978-4-06-388416-6	December 13, 2022	978-1-68491-583-5
328–337
35	April 23, 2015	978-4-06-388436-4	February 14, 2023	978-1-68491-696-2
338–347
36	September 23, 2015	978-4-06-388474-6	April 11, 2023	978-1-68491-885-0
348–357
37	November 20, 2015	978-4-06-388510-1	June 13, 2023	978-1-68491-965-9
358–367
38	January 22, 2016	978-4-06-388559-0	August 8, 2023	979-8-88933-093-6
368–377
39	March 23, 2016	978-4-06-388572-9	October 10, 2023	979-8-88933-182-7
378–387
40	May 23, 2016	978-4-06-388595-8	December 12, 2023	979-8-88933-289-3
388–397
41	July 22, 2016	978-4-06-388617-7	February 13, 2024	979-8-88933-372-2
398–407
42	October 21, 2016	978-4-06-388637-5	April 9, 2024	979-8-88933-434-7
408–417
43	March 23, 2017	978-4-06-388659-7	June 11, 2024	979-8-88933-566-5
418–427
44	July 21, 2017	978-4-06-388694-8	August 13, 2024	979-8-88933-692-1
428–437
45	October 23, 2017	978-4-06-510278-7	October 8, 2024	979-8-89478-101-3
438–447
46	January 23, 2018	978-4-06-510735-5	December 10, 2024	979-8-89478-301-7
448–457
47	April 23, 2018	978-4-06-511227-4	February 11, 2025	979-8-89478-366-6
458–467
48	July 23, 2018	978-4-06-511858-0	April 8, 2025	979-8-89478-502-8
468–477
49	October 23, 2018	978-4-06-513496-2	June 10, 2025	979-8-89478-503-5
478–487
50	January 23, 2019	978-4-06-514529-6	August 12, 2025	979-8-89478-504-2
51	April 23, 2019	978-4-06-515481-6	October 14, 2025	979-8-89478-505-9
52	July 23, 2019	978-4-06-516563-8	December 9, 2025	979-8-89478-506-6
53	October 23, 2019	978-4-06-517328-2	February 10, 2026	979-8-89478-507-3
54	March 23, 2020	978-4-06-518917-7	April 14, 2026	979-8-89478-508-0
55	June 23, 2020	978-4-06-519910-7	June 9, 2026	979-8-89478-509-7
56	September 23, 2020	978-4-06-520766-6	July 7, 2026	979-8-89-830166-8
57	December 23, 2020	978-4-06-521770-2	August 11, 2026	979-8-89-830205-4
58	May 21, 2021	978-4-06-523276-7	September 8, 2026	979-8-89-830280-1
59	September 22, 2021	978-4-06-524866-9	October 6, 2026	979-8-89-830289-4
60	February 22, 2022	978-4-06-526771-4	November 10, 2026	979-8-89-830327-3
61	July 22, 2022	978-4-06-528537-4	—	—
62	November 22, 2023	978-4-06-529759-9	—	—
63	March 22, 2024	978-4-06-534888-8	—	—
64	July 23, 2024	978-4-06-536209-9	—	—
65	November 21, 2024	978-4-06-537527-3	—	—
66	March 21, 2025	978-4-06-538846-4	—	—
67	July 23, 2025	978-4-06-540079-1	—	—
68	November 21, 2025	978-4-06-541441-5	—	—
69	March 23, 2026	978-4-06-542927-3	—	—
70	July 22, 2026	978-4-06-544416-0	—	—
71	November 20, 2026	978-4-06-545554-8	—	—

=== Anime ===
An anime television series was produced by Studio Deen, directed by Yuu Kou, and written by Toshifumi Kawase. The anime began airing in Japan on April 4, 2010. On May 21, 2010, it was announced that Crunchyroll had picked up the series for simulcast distribution starting on May 23. The opening theme song to Giant Killing is "My Story", by THE CHERRY COKE$. The closing credit music is "Get tough!" by G.P.S.

==== Episodes ====
No.	Title	Original release date
1	"#01"	April 4, 2010
Takeshi Tatsumi, former player for the East Tokyo United (ETU), led a fifth division team in England to 32nd place in the FA Cup. ETU has recruited him to come back and coach them. He makes a controversial move on the first day of training by picking the starters based on just their 30 meter sprints.
2	"#02"	April 11, 2010
Tatsumi has his starters play a practice match with the veteran players; the young starters use Tatsumi's advice and they defeat the veterans. Tatsumi makes a shocking announcement at a press conference and Murakoshi gets mad at him.
3	"#03"	April 18, 2010
On the first day of camp, Tatsumi's instructions were: self-training. On top of that, Tatsumi makes it even harder by insisting that they all share a single ball. When the players start arguing about what should be focused on, finally a brawl breaks out. While the coaches are trying to break it up, a late player called "Prince" appears.
4	"#04"	April 25, 2010
The first match for the new ETU under Tatsumi's lead is against the champion, Tokyo Victory. The Victory players take note of Gino wearing the captains mark, and the new starter, Tsubaki. During camp Tsubaki did not show much potential, but in this match he shines in tandem with Tatsumi's tactics, shaking up the Victory bench. Tatsumi starts to explain his reasons to coach Matsuhara who was surprised by Tsubaki's good performance. Second half of the Tokyo Victory match. Tsubaki screwed up and gave the opponents a chance to score. Tatsumi tries to fire up Tsubaki by saying that he shouldn't worry about a foul. In order to combat Victory's increasing pace, Tatsumi puts in offensive players midfield. Though Tsubaki was motivated by Tatsumi, it doesn't go well and his efforts turn our disastrous. Meanwhile, Murakoshi re-examines himself as a player and tries to find a hole for the counterattack.
5	"#05"	May 2, 2010
Second half of the Tokyo Victory match. Tsubaki screwed up and gave the opponents a chance to score. Tatsumi tries to fire up Tsubaki by saying that he shouldn't worry about a foul. In order to combat Victory's increasing pace, Tatsumi puts in offensive players midfield. Though Tsubaki was motivated by Tatsumi, it doesn't go well and his efforts turn our disastrous. Meanwhile, Murakoshi re-examines himself as a player and tries to find a hole for the counterattack.
6	"#06"	May 9, 2010
A league press conference is being held. While everybody is in formal attire, Tatsumi wears his normal clothes. He meets Nagoya Grand Palace's manager Fuwa, who has history with ETU, and meets last season's 2nd, Osaka Gunners' manager Dulfer. When the ceremony begins, Goto and Yuri are worried; quite right, as Tatsumi lets loose once again. A dubious Frenchman takes a liking to Tatsumi and takes him away...
7	"#07"	May 16, 2010
A league match against manager Kurashi's Javelin Iwata. After a lucky shot puts Iwata in the lead, ETU is totally overrun by Iwata's assault. After being dissatisfied by the way the game went, the free reporter Fujisawa asks Tatsumi a question at the press conference. While he answers it coolly and whips up another frenzy there, the next match against Sun Arrow Hiroshima is another loss...
8	"#08"	May 23, 2010
After hearing a rumor that Kuroda is about to transfer, Matsuhara feels uneasy. However, Tatsumi declares again that the starting players will be picked with the soccer tennis game. Amongst the disgruntled players, Kuroda finally lets his anger explode and boycotts the training. Matsue, who also left the training, begins to tell Kuroda about a mistake that they as center backs had not noticed yet.
9	"#09"	May 30, 2010
Since Tatsumi became manager, ETU has lost 4 matches in a row. The Skulls fan group can't conceal their anger any longer. At the peak of their anger, they stop the players' bus and demand an apology from Tatsumi. Tatsumi stops Murakoshi from appeasing the crowd and tries to go out himself. Does he have a secret strategy against Nagoya Grand Palace?!
10	"#10"	June 6, 2010
The fans are demanding that Tatsumi is canned. The opponent they face during their last stand is Nagoya Grand Palace, led by ETU's former manager Fuwa. In a stark contrast to ETU, Fuwa has been winning cup and league matches. He is an absolutely rational coach who used expensive foreign players to raise the power of the entire team. In the beginning, the Brazilian trio goes on a fierce offensive, but Tatsumi's plans are already in motion...
11	"#11"	June 13, 2010
ETU vs Nagoya Grand Palace. In the first half, ETU is faced with a relentless assault, but thanks to Tsubaki's repeated smooth plays, the danger of losing a point is always averted. Fuwa slowly starts to realize that Tatsumi's plan has been set in motion. However, ETU does not launch a full assault. While Matsubara can't hide his worries about the defense-only match, Tatsumi is grinning smugly. And the thing Tsubaki sees when he gets on the field is...!
12	"#12"	June 20, 2010
Nagoya can't break ETU's defense line, so they put Carlos up front and attack with their strongest formation. This is exactly what Tatsumi has been waiting for. ETU is desperate to withstand the Brazilian onslaught. They block their shot and begin their own counterattack. That was Tatsumi's plan all along. The ball goes to Gino and ETU's attack finally begins. Who will score?!
13	"#13"	June 27, 2010
ETU control the Brazilian trio and successfully take the lead. 15 minutes left and Nagoya comes attacking back. But, ETU's composure as a team allows them to withstand the onslaught.
14	"#14"	July 4, 2010
Delighted over their first win, Goto takes ETA out to the shopping district and thinks about reviving the old cheering squad. But, the old fans don't seem 100% on board when asked. Though he tries hard, it is not successful and night sets in.
15	"#15"	July 11, 2010
ETU faces off against FC Sapporo for the prelims in the Japan Cup.
16	"#16"	July 18, 2010
Natsuki returns to practice with ETU. He was their top goal scorer the previous season.
17	"#17"	July 25, 2010
The team loses a critical starter for a week with a sprained ankle.
18	"#18"	August 1, 2010
ETU is coming off its fourth match in a row. No one is sure if the team is in top shape or not when the match against Albireos Niigata begins. The built-up pressure and excitement leads Akasaki to get a yellow card while defending. At halftime, Akasaki says something that sparks a giant argument. The coach and others try to break it up in haste when they come to a quick conclusion.
19	"#19"	August 8, 2010
The battle against the Osaka Gunners is about to begin. They employee a highly aggressive offensive formation utilizing four forwards. This is a point of pride for all of Osaka.
20	"#20"	August 15, 2010
ETU begins their match against the Osaka Gunners. They are holding their ground man-to-man for now, but...
21	"#21"	August 22, 2010
ETU has their backs to the wall due to the Osaka Gunners' vicious attacks. They stiffen their defense and brace for a comeback.
22	"#22"	August 29, 2010
Sugie and Kuroda, both vital defensemen for ETU, give up two goals in the first half. How will they recover?
23	"#23"	September 5, 2010
Just before the match against Osaka, a question is posed to Natsuki... Does the ball belong to your team? Or you?
24	"#24"	September 12, 2010
ETU continues their run. Will they prevail? Only time will tell.
25	"#25"	September 19, 2010
ETU has tied the game with a goal off a free kick earned by Tsubaki's legs and stamina. While Matsubara is excited and presses for the next strategy, Tatsumi responds with a disappointing "My plan was to keep Osaka at one point and to win 2-1. I dunno about the 3rd goal." Matsubara is shocked, but Tatsumi continues "I am counting on him changing the fact that ETU lacks the last bit of strength in the end."
26	"#26"	September 26, 2010
Akasaki appears in a match as an Olympic team member. Tatsumi removes Akasaki from the next game's starting lineup so he can regain his strength. Meanwhile, Gino complains about the condition of his foot and Tatsumi pulls him from the starting lineup as well. With the starting lineup for the next match against Kawasaki settled and two of the primary players sitting out, Tatsumi has a thought: To organize a certain event with the local people, the ETU staff, and all the players!?

== Reception ==
Giant Killing won the 34th Kodansha Manga Award in the general category in 2010.

== See also ==
- Mr. CB, another manga series by the same writer
