= Kent H. Dixon =

American author, scholar and translator

Kent Hooker Dixon (born June 3, 1941) is an American author, scholar and translator.

== Early life and education ==
Dixon was born in Miami Beach, Florida. He attended the Asheville School for Boys. In college, summers were spent in France and Italy, learning languages and being drawn to poets and philosophers.

He earned a Bachelor of Arts from the University of North Carolina in comparative literature and French, a Master of Arts from Johns Hopkins University and his Ph.D. from the University of Iowa with concentrations in American literature, modern art and film.

In 1960, he pledged for Beta Theta Pi. Dixon became a member of the Mayflower Club, Colonial Wars, Sons of the Revolution, Order of Founders and Patriots of America.

== Career ==
In 1965, Asheville School for Boys hired Dixon to teach English and French, as well as coach track and swimming. He also assumed the role of faculty advisor for the school's literary magazine. In the role of Jake, Dixon debuted as a performer in the Asheville Community Theatre's 1967 musical presentation of "The Three Penny Opera."

From 1980-2012, Dixon taught literature and creative writing at Wittenberg University. He was granted tenure in 1986. He continued to teach a summer course on white water kayaking and creative writing after retirement.

The Nuclear Dilemma became an important topic for Dixon in the 1980s. He along with three other Wittenberg professors commenced a seminar on the subject in 1982 as a part of a year-long examination of "War and Peace." His opinion of war was shared briefly in 1983 through his view of the threat of nuclear war and its psychological effects, specifically on children impacted by viewing "The Day After."

== Writing ==
Dixon is primarily considered a prose writer focusing on short shorts and translations. His fiction writings have been published in The Iowa Review, TriQuarterly, The Georgia Review, The Antioch Review, Shenandoah, The Gettysburg Review, and the Carolina Quarterly. He has released nonfiction in The American Prospect, Energy Review, Florida Review, Kansas Quarterly and Grand Tour.

"God Crosses His Sevens," a story by Dixon was a 1963 selection in "The Young Writer at Chapel Hill" anthology by UNC creative writing students. It was considered "the best story in the collection," by journalist Larry Walz.

"The Epic of Gilgamesh," is a 2018 graphic novel adaptation of the epic Babylonian poem with influences by Robert Crumb, published by Seven Stories Press.

== Works ==
=== Publications ===
- The Epic of Gilgamesh (2018)
- Obsession: Kayak (2016)
- Bernie's Hole: A Meditation of the Superman, or Maybe Just on Clark Kent (2016)
- Knock, Knock: A Deconstruction (2013)
- From Batista to Fidel, & on To the Real Enemy of the People: ¡Viva la revolución! (2001)
- 48 Hours in the County Jail (1997)
- The House that Crack Built (1993)
- Lorelei (1991)
- Tessellations (1974)
- God Crosses His Sevens (1963)

=== Translations ===
Dixon has translated the work of Charles Baudelaire, Stéphan Mallarmé, Rainer Maria Rilke and Sappho.

- Enivrez-vous - (Get Drunk) by Baudelaire
- L’Etranger - (The Stranger) by Baudelaire
- Le Chien et le flacon - (The Dog and the Perfume) by Baudelaire
- L’après-midi d’un faune - (The Afternoon of a Faun) by Mallarmé
- Leichen-Wäsche - (The Corpse Washers) by Rilke
- To Anaktoria by Sappho
- Unheard Melodies by Sappho

== Awards ==
- Three time Pushcart Prize nominee
- Three Ohio Arts Council awards
- Honorable Mention in Best American Short Stories
- Sport Literate winner (2016)
- Notable Essays listing in Best American Essays: 1997
- Second place in Story magazine's Libido competition (1996)
- First prize in Story magazine's Love Story Competition (1994)

== Personal life ==
Dixon married Beverly Alice Davis on August 21, 1964. She attended the University of North Carolina, as well, and was a member of Kappa Delta sorority. They had a civil ceremony in Norway followed by a homecoming on November 7. The couple divorced when their sons were young. The boys moved with their father from Iowa to California to Ohio before reuniting with Davis in Chapel Hill in the early '80s. Beverly has exhibited her paintings at art shows with their sons, Laird S. Dixon, a sculptor, and Kevin H. Dixon, an underground comic book artist. Kevin collaborated with his father as the illustrator on "The Epic of Gilgamesh."

Dixon later married Mimi Still, daughter of Ray Still, and together raised four sons. Christopher J. Dixon, a venture capitalist at Andreesen Horowitz, donated $75,000 to Wittenberg University in his parents' honor to establish the Dixon Professorship endowment in 2013. The award was intended to attract writer-in-residence candidates to fill the vacant positions left by his parents upon their retirement.
