= Alien Nine =

Japanese manga series

- North American cover of Alien Nine volume 1

エイリアン9 (Eirian Nain)
- Genre: Science fiction
- Manga
- Written by: Hitoshi Tomizawa
- Published by: Akita Shoten
- English publisher: US: CPM Press
- Magazine: Young Champion
- Original run: 9 June 1998 – 24 August 1999
- Volumes: 3
- Original video animation
- Directed by: Jiro Fujimoto (ep. 1); Yasuhiro Irie (ep. 2–4)
- Written by: Sadayuki Murai
- Music by: Kuniaki Haishima
- Studio: J.C.Staff
- Licensed by: AUS: Hanabee; NA: AnimEigo
- Released: 25 June 2001 – 25 February 2002
- Runtime: 30 minutes
- Episodes: 4
- Manga

Alien 9 Emulators
- Written by: Hitoshi Tomizawa
- Published by: Akita Shoten
- English publisher: US: CPM Press
- Magazine: Champion Red
- Original run: 19 August 2002 – 19 December 2002
- Volumes: 1
- Manga

Alien 9 Next
- Written by: Hitoshi Tomizawa
- Published by: Self-funded dōjinshi
- Original run: 19 August 2015 – 21 August 2016
- Volumes: 3

Alien Nine (エイリアン9, Eirian Nain) is a Japanese manga series written and illustrated by Hitoshi Tomizawa. The manga was serialized in Akita Shoten's Young Champion magazine from June 1998 to August 1999, spanning 3 tankōbon volumes. In 2003, Tomizawa released a 1-volume sequel to the series called Alien 9 Emulators. In 2015, Tomizawa also released a sequel doujinshi to Alien 9 and Alien 9 Emulators called Alien 9 Next. Both the manga and anime are noted for their moe art style and heavy violence despite the young main characters, Pokémon-like monster designs, and initial appearances of a slice-of-life-esque series.

It was adapted into an original video animation (OVA) series by J.C.Staff between June 2001 to February 2002. The English adaptation of the series was first licensed by Central Park Media, and has played on Comcast's Anime Selects. Central Park Media released the title under their "US Manga Corps" line, on a single DVD, and later re-released the DVD in a box set with all three manga volumes, which was also licensed by Central Park Media under their "CPM Manga" line. Central Park Media filed for bankruptcy in 2009, and the DVDs and manga volumes subsequently went out of print in North America. In 2026, publisher Peow2 announced they had licensed the complete edition of the manga to be released in 2027.

== Story ==
=== Alien Nine ===
In the year 2014, 16 years after humanity's first contact with aliens, Yuri Otani, a rather melancholic 12-year-old, has just arrived in the sixth grade at Elementary School No. 9. She is elected, against her wishes, by an overwhelming majority of her classmates in the Tsubaki (Camellia) Class to join the "Alien Party", a team whose primary objective is to capture any otherworldly aliens that may appear on campus, advised by the teacher Megumi Hisakawa. To make matters even worse for Yuri, the only way to capture the aliens is to adjoin with a Borg, a symbiotic life-form whose sole purpose is to protect their host as well as incapacitate and capture other aliens, using anything available to their arsenal (which includes, but is not limited to: Borgs, inline roller blades, knee pads, tranquilizer dart guns, and lacrosse sticks.) Yuri is not alone in her tribulations, for she has two other Alien Party member friends – Kasumi Tōmine and Kumi Kawamura. Over time it becomes clear that Kumi and Kasumi are far more capable alien fighters than Yuri, who is terrified of the aliens and wants nothing more than to leave the Alien Party.

It is subsequently revealed that Ms. Hisakawa is the one releasing the aliens for the alien fighters to train with, as the Alien Party is really intended to raise suitable human hosts for symbiotic fusion with the Borg of the Drill Clan (Ms. Hisakawa herself being one result of the process). In an attempt to push Yuri harder in order to speed up her progress, Ms. Hisakawa gives three boys in the school the aggressive "Gladius" parasitic alien in order to serve as training targets because of the apparently "relatively weak" nature of the alien. She also instructs Yuri to take care of the aliens in the alien storeroom by herself, setting her up for the three boys to corner and attack her. However, this backfires when Yuri is overcome by fear and panic, causing her Borg to overreact and kill every alien in the storeroom (including the "Gladius" aliens). As she walks out of the storeroom to meet her close friend Miyu, traumatized and still wearing her Borg, she encounters Kumi and Kasumi (who telepathically sense her overwhelming fear through their connection with their Borgs) and also ends up killing their Borgs as her own Borg instinctively lashes out against the other aliens she fears. She finally collapses at Miyu's feet on her knees in tears, her own Borg dying due to the overreaction and falling off her head.

As a result of the incident, Ms. Hisakawa is rebuked by the headmistress of the school, Ms. Okada (another Borg-fused human), and informed that she may even be replaced by another advisor by the supervisors. With the Borgs dead, it will take about a month for her to create new ones with the memories of the old ones. Fortunately, the incident takes place just before the summer, and the alien fighters go on a vacation together with Miyu in order to cheer up Yuri and allow her to recover from the traumatizing incident with the "Gladius" aliens. With renewed determination, Yuri resolves to do better in the coming semester.

After returning to school, a new alien type known as a "Yellow Knife" lands on the school. Kasumi displays an unusual attraction towards the "Yellow Knife" and ends up letting herself be consumed by it, somehow coming to identify it with her beloved older brother. In order to "protect" Kasumi by making sure nobody gets close to her, the "Yellow Knife" then starts projecting psychic waves that induce headaches in people unprotected by Borg symbiotes. The Alien Party remains unaffected and attempts to cut Kasumi out of the "Yellow Knife". Feeling threatened by the Alien Party and using her desperate loneliness following her older brother's departure for the United States, the "Yellow Knife" then projects her an illusion towards the Alien Party that makes them think they are completely alone in the world. Both Yuri and Kumi are emotionally crippled by the loneliness, but Kumi's Borg manages to snap her out of it and she is able to see through the illusion and reach Yuri. Together, they are able to fatally wound the "Yellow Knife" and extract Kasumi from it, but not before it manages to symbiotically fuse with Kasumi. Kasumi then proceeds to strangle Kumi for hurting the "Yellow Knife" until Yuri's pleas cause the "Yellow Knife" to convince her to stop, since their fusion meant that it would always be with her. The "Yellow Knife" then explodes, perishing.

Still recovering from the "Yellow Knife" incident, Kumi is then discovered dead in the school library by Kasumi. It is at this point that the OVA series ends. In the manga, it is shown that Kumi had become suspicious of Kasumi's behavior following her rescue from the "Yellow Knife" and had gone into the library to research more about the "Yellow Knife" when she was attacked and killed. Her body severely damaged by the alien, she is then put under reconstruction with the cell gel. In the meantime, while looking for clues about the attacker, Yuri and Kasumi are themselves attacked by the alien, a "Lynax". The "Lynax" proves to be beyond the capabilities of Yuri and Kasumi, and they both begin to be overwhelmed. Sensing their desperation, Kumi's reconstruction is sped up by an unusual merging with her Borg, and she recovers just in time to save Yuri and Kasumi.

Following this incident, Yuri, uncomfortable with Kasumi's unusual behavior and Kumi's apparent return from the dead, wanders into the Forest of Spaceships, a dangerous area of the school inhabited by aliens, where she is attacked and separated from her Borg. In order to protect its host, the Borg stores Yuri's memories, but has gone into hiding. In order to restore Yuri's memories, Kumi and Kasumi enter the forest in search of Yuri's Borg. There, they succeed in recovering the critically injured Borg but are themselves attacked by other aliens. Kasumi ends up revealing her fusion with the "Yellow Knife", successfully fending off and killing multiple attacking aliens, while Kumi's arm is torn off, revealing that she no longer has a human body: her arm is nothing more than a layer of skin surrounding several Borg drills. After recovering the Borg, they restore Yuri's memories. In the aftermath, Kasumi and the "Yellow Knife" inside her are interrogated by Ms. Hisakawa. The "Yellow Knife" remarks about how humans make good symbiotic hosts for aliens and that other aliens have figured out the strategy of the Drill Clan; they have now targeted humans for symbiosis as well. With Kasumi having fused with the "Yellow Knife" and Kumi herself turned into a Borg, losing human functions such as reproduction and no longer viable as a symbiotic host, Yuri is the only viable human host left among the Alien Party members for the Drill Clan. Kumi then resolves to protect Yuri from getting fused with any alien and enlists Kasumi's help.

In the third and final semester of school, Yuri's Borg begins to become agitated as it desperately wants to fuse with Yuri. Taking pity on it, Ms. Hisakawa allows Yuri's Borg to attempt to force Yuri to fuse with it, but Yuri resists and the Borg is stopped by Kumi and Kasumi. Meanwhile, the Sunflower Clan, mortal enemies of the Drill Clan, arrive at the school. They succeed in capturing Yuri and attempt to fuse with her and other students in the Tsubaki Class, but are far more aggressive and manipulative, resulting in serious injury to most students the Sunflowers attempt to fuse with. Kasumi attempts to disable Yuri using her "Yellow Knife" psychic abilities, but is overwhelmed by Yuri and three other boys controlled by the Sunflowers. The Sunflowers attempt to fuse with Kasumi, who struggles furiously against them, begging for them to be removed. Yuri, having not completely fused with the Sunflowers, removes the Sunflower from Kasumi just as Ms. Hisakawa and her Borg arrive to kill the Sunflowers and Yuri. Kumi, believing that Yuri can still be saved because she has not fused completely with the Sunflower, stops Ms. Hisakawa. With the help of Yuri's Borg, is able to reach into Yuri's mind and ultimately get her to overcome the Sunflowers.

In the aftermath of the Sunflower invasion, the Tsubaki Class is treated for their injuries, with the students permitted to miss the Japanese entrance exam and pick any junior high school they wish. Headmistress Okada points out to Ms. Hisakawa that it may be a good thing for the humans to be allowed to choose other clans or aliens they wished to fuse with. When Ms. Hisakawa replies that it will be much harder and they'll have to convince the humans that they'll be happier living with the Drill Clan, the headmistress chides her, saying she'd "better get it together."

The following spring, Yuri has moved in together with Kasumi and Kumi, who are attending the same junior high school. While apparently still unchanged from her elementary school habits such as sleeping in late (much to Kumi's chagrin) and apparently still an ordinary human, as she wakes up and gets ready for school, she notices a lock of her hair has started curling into a drill.

=== Alien Nine Emulators ===
Alien Nine Emulators is set in the spring of 2015, picking up immediately after the end of Alien Nine. Yuri, Kumi, Kasumi, and Miyu are now students at the Hinode Junior High School, with the first three now sharing an apartment. Thinking she has put all alien-related matters behind her, Yuri is dismayed to find herself once again drafted as an alien fighter along with Kumi and Kasumi when a spaceship lands at Hinode. They are drafted by Monami Komai, a third-year student at Hinode who is herself an alien fighter and alien symbiont.

Yuri is subsequently kidnapped by 6th and 7th generation Borg symbionts, who intend to use her and another kidnapped student to evolve into 10th generation Borg symbionts. However, the older Borg symbionts are killed by an 8th generation Borg symbiont in order to evolve itself into a 10th generation Borg symbiont. The other alien fighters, along with Ms. Hisakawa who was sent by Principal Okada to investigate the reports of older generation Borg appearing at Hinode, arrive to rescue Yuri. Kumi recognizes the 8th generation Borg as the one who stabbed her in the library back in Elementary School No. 9, leading to her death at the hands of the "Lynax" alien. Enraged, she fights and kills the 8th generation Borg. Principal Okada subsequently informs Ms. Hisakawa that the "committee" suspects that Kumi may be a 10th generation Borg.

A resurgence in the number of aliens arriving at the school leads to Ms. Hisakawa putting the fighters in charge of an "alien district"; since Yuri is not a symbiont, she is given an apparently defective Borg that cannot fuse with her for protection. However, the "defective" Borg is actually Ms. Hisakawa's fused Borg in disguise, assigned to observe the students. It observes Kumi feeling very lonely and homesick and crying in her apartment, thus ruling her out as a 10th generation Borg. Yuri has also become friends with a male schoolmate, which leads to the overprotective Kumi becoming jealous. While reporting its findings to Ms. Hisakawa, Kasumi becomes aware of the true nature of Yuri's Borg. Having tried to comfort Kumi during her bouts of loneliness, she and the Yellow Knife fused with her decide to help Kumi.

In May 2015, Kasumi enacts her plan, and a group of Yellow Knife aliens descend on the Hinode Junior High School. Using psychic interference waves to knock out nearly everyone within a radius of the school and begin to consume students. Kasumi also kills Ms. Hisakawa's Borg, much to her distress. Kasumi then wakes Kumi up, who is swallowed by a Yellow Knife. Revealing that Kumi is dying of loneliness from her refusal to fuse with Yuri, Kasumi tells Yuri that she has an obligation to save Kumi after all the times Kumi has saved her. Yuri is then engulfed by the same Yellow Knife. Ms. Hisakawa, still agitated by her Borg's death, steals the Principal's Borg and attempts to use it to kill Kasumi, but is stopped by Monami. However, Monami's Borg, on its own initiative, stabs Kasumi with a tendril, disabling her. Ms. Hisakawa then goes off to destroy the Yellow Knives and release the trapped students. Inside one of the Yellow Knives, the Borg within Kumi as now taken control and wishes to fuse with Yuri.

Having destroyed some of the Yellow Knives, Monami restrains Ms. Hisakawa before she can destroy the next Yellow Knife and chastises her for her callousness. However, the Yellow Knife releases an apparently fused Yuri and Kumi, much to their surprise. Restrained for examination, "Yuri" is revealed to be Kumi in disguise. Unwilling to sacrifice Yuri in order to save herself, Kumi begs Monami to kill her before her Borg takes over completely. Yuri crawls out from the Yellow Knife's stomach, but by the time she reaches the containment cell, Kumi's Borg has already taken over and she starts to lash out in desperation in order to fuse. In order to save Kumi, Monami disables Kumi and uses her Borg to transfer Kumi's memory into Kasumi's unfused Borg. The story ends with Kasumi and Ms. Hisakawa going to California along with Kumi in order to help her recover, while Yuri remains in Japan as a member of the Hinode Junior High Alien Fighters.

=== Alien 9 Next ===
Alien 9 Next is set 11 years after the original series, in September 2025. Yuri has now joined an alien pest handling company started by Monami, while Kumi, Ms. Hisakawa, and Kasumi (who is now Queen of the Yellow Knives) have embarked on a joint Yellow Knife-Borg venture, creating the first Earth-made "Star Seed." Kumi, along with Borgs carrying Kasumi and Yuri's personalities, embarks on the maiden voyage of the Star Seed as an "astro-navigator". The craft ends up landing on the Borg homeworld, and Kumi is captured by the original Borg. Kasumi's Borg-Yellow Knife hybrid on board the now-crippled Star Seed combines its power with Yuri's Borg to send a signal back to Earth to inform the team. However, the signal compels the Principal to "obey the originals" and she kills Kasumi, leaving two Borgs trapped in the Star Seed with no communications with Earth. Because of her fusion with the Yellow Knives, the Yellow Knives simply birth another Kasumi after she dies, who remarks that the original Borg are no longer a myth. The series ends with a man approaching Monami and Yuri with a request for the alien fighters.

== Characters ==
Yuri Otani (大谷 ゆり, Otani Yuri)
Voiced by: Juri Ihata (Japanese); Kelly Ray (English)
A quiet girl, who was voted by her 6th-grade classmates to be their representative on the Alien Party. Yuri is very reluctant to merge with her Borg. She is easily frightened and there is hardly anything that won't make her cry, being scared or happy. Yuri was the only one in the group to remain fully human after refusing to merge with her borg even after her borg died saving her life from the Sunflowers. But, despite this, her hair curled into a drill.
Kumi Kawamura (川村 くみ, Kawamura Kumi)
Voiced by: Kaori Shimizu (Japanese); Debora Rabbai (English)
The most independent member of the Alien Party, and a 6th-grade student. She has been a member of the Student Council for years and has assisted her widowed mother in her writing activities as well as an above average number of chores for a student her age. In the manga, she is attacked by an alien and is revived by fusing with an alien from the Drill "Clan".
Kasumi Tōmine (遠峰 かすみ, Tōmine Kasumi)
Voiced by: Noriko Shitaya (Japanese); Jessica Calvello (credited as Zoe Fries) (English)
A "genius-type" sixth-grade student, who is talented in piano, ballet, chess, robotics competitions and roller skating. She is the most enthusiastic member of the Alien Party. Kasumi has a brother, whom she greatly loved and who was sent to a private school abroad. In the manga, after being absorbed by a Yellow Knife alien, she becomes part Yellow Knife herself, though hinted at in the anime.
Megumi Hisakawa (久川 めぐみ, Hisakawa Megumi)
Voiced by: Aya Hisakawa (Japanese); Veronica Taylor (English)
The teacher and counsellor in charge of the Alien Party.
Miyu Tamaki (珠木 美佑, Tamaki Miyu)
Voiced by: Manami Nakayama (Japanese); Rachael Lillis (English)
A sixth-grade student and Yuri's good friend and classmate.
Borg (ボウグ, Bōgu)
Voiced by: Ryūsei Nakao (all) (Japanese); Jimmy Zoppi (Kumi's Borg), Joshua Popenoe (Yuri's Borg), Tristan Goddard (Kasumi's Borg) (English)
A symbiotic lifeform, whose sole purpose is to protect their host, incapacitate, and ultimately capture other aliens, using anything available to their arsenal. Borgs feed on the waste of their hosts. It would appear that when one is attached long enough to the Borg, they gain its abilities, as seen with some characters' hair despite the fact they aren't wearing one.

=== Other characters ===
Yuri's Mom
Voiced by: Yuko Kato (Japanese); Lynna Dunham (English)
Hiroshi Iwanami
Voiced by: Yuko Sanpei (Japanese); Michael Sinterniklaas (English)
Yellow Knife
Voiced by: Akira Ishida (Japanese); J. David Brimmer (English)
Principal
Voiced by: Rei Sakuma (Japanese); Suzy Savoy (English)

== Release ==
=== Alien Nine ===
No.	Original release date	Original ISBN	English release date	English ISBN
1	1 February 1999	978-4253146074	1 May 2003	978-1586648916
"Operation 1: Yuri"; "Operation 2: Kumi"; "Operation 3: Kasumi"; "Operation 4: Ms. Hisakawa"; "Operation 5: Alien Landing Today"; "Operation 6: A Chain Attack"; "Operation 7: Alien Keeper"; "Operation 8: Hyper-Growth"; "Operation 9: Summer Vacation"; "Operation 10: Second Semester Begins"
2	1 June 1999	978-4253146081	9 July 2003	978-1586648923
"Operation 11: The Yellow Knife"; "Operation 12: Incision"; "Operation 13: All Alone"; "Operation 14: Rescuing Kasumi"; "Operation 15: The Kumi Incident"; "Operation 16: Reconstruction"; "Operation 17: The Yuri Incident"; "Operation 18: The Forest of Spaceships"; "Operation 19: Gushing Out"; "Operation 20: The Market"
3	1 November 1999	978-4253146098	10 September 2003	978-1586648930
"Operation 21: Third Semester Begins"; "Operation 22: You Can't Stop Me!"; "Operation 23: Yuri the Fool"; "Operation 24: Try This Little Guy"; "Operation 25: Open the Window"; "Operation 26: Stop Interfering!"; "Operation 27: The Helper"; "Operation 28: The Alien Party"; "Operation 29: Who Am I?"; "Operation 30: Back to Normal"

=== Alien Nine Emulators ===
No.	Original release date	Original ISBN	English release date	English ISBN
1	May 2003	978-4253231015	4 February 2004	978-1586649241
"Plan 1: A New World"; "Plan 2: Alien 9"; "Plan 3: Kasumi the Yellow Knife"; "Plan 4: Kumi and Yuri"; "Final Plan 5: Ultimate Symbiotes"; "Special Plan 1: Three Fit Girls"; "Alien Hell"; "Special Plan 2: Maybe None of Us are Fools"

== Anime ==
The first half of the series (through the middle of Volume 2) was later adapted into an original video animation (OVA) series, which was released across four volumes by Bandai Visual from 2001 to 2002, containing one episode each. Animated by J.C.Staff and produced by Genco, the first volume of the series was directed by Jirō Fujimoto, while volumes 2–4 were directed by Yasuhiro Irie, who also handled the entire series' character designs, and was written by Sadayuki Murai. A special TV broadcast was aired prior to the series' DVD release on AT-X. The opening themes are "Flower Psychedelic: Kasumi Tomine Version" by Noriko Shitaya, "Flower Psychedelic: Kumi Kawamura Version" by Kaori Shimizu, and "Flower Psychedelic: Yuri Otani Version" by Juri Ihata, the ending theme is "rebirth" by en avant.

It has been broadcast by the anime television network Animax across its respective networks worldwide, including East Asia and its English-language networks in Southeast Asia (where it was previously also aired by its sister network AXN) and South Asia. The anime was licensed and released in North America by Central Park Media, with the series being aired across the region on Comcast's Select On Demand service. As the OVA series ends halfway through the story, the DVD was made available in America in an "Ultimate Edition", which included all three original volumes of the collected translated manga. The series was later released on Blu-ray by Animeigo in 2026.

Tarō Maki (President of Genco and executive producer of the anime OVA adaptation) has stated in an interview that due to the abruptness of the anime OVA ending, he stated that will raise funds to continue the series. However, this has not happened for over a decade and is considered to be in development hell and is most likely cancelled. That does not, however, rule out the possibility of a reboot to cover all three of the manga volumes plus the sequel, Alien Nine Emulators.

Due to its rarity, it has become a cult classic amongst fans and collectors.

=== Staff ===
- Series composition: Sadayuki Murai
- Character design: Yasuhiro Irie
- Creature design: Kazunori Iwakura
- Art director: Jun'ichi Higashi
- Sound director: Yoshikazu Iwanami
- Music: Kuniaki Haishima
- Photography director: Masaru Takase
- Directors: Jirō Fujimoto (Vol.1), Yasuhiro Irie (Vol.2 – Vol.4)
- Animation production: J.C.Staff
- Production: Alien 9 Production Committee (Bandai Visual, TV Tokyo Media Net, Nippon Columbia, AT-X, GENCO)

=== Episode list ===
No.	Title	Directed by	Written by	Original release date
1	"9th Elementary Anti-Alien Squad"; Transliteration: "Dai 9 shōgakkō eirian taisaku-gakari" (Japanese: 第9小学校 エイリアン対策係)	Jirō Fujimoto	Sadayuki Murai	25 June 2001
2	"Boredom, Spaceship and Overgrowth"; Transliteration: "Taikutsu uchūsen kaseichō" (Japanese: 退屈 宇宙船 過成長)	Katsushi Sakurabi	Seishi Minakami	25 September 2001
3	"Summer Vacation, Borg and Death"; Transliteration: "Natsuyasumi bōgu zetsumei" (Japanese: 夏休み ボウグ 絶命)	Katsushi Sakurabi	Sadayuki Murai	25 November 2001
4	"The End of the Beginning"; Transliteration: "Hajimari no owari" (Japanese: 始まりの終わり)	Yasuhiro Irie	Seishi Minakami	25 February 2002

== Reception ==
On Anime News Network, Zac Bertschy gave the story a grade of A and the art a grade of B+. Helen McCarthy in 500 Essential Anime Movies praises the OVA's pace and interesting character designs, stating that "although this looks at first like a cute, child-friendly sci-fi tale, it's actually a scare allegory on what it means to grow up".

The anime entry in The Encyclopedia of Science Fiction notes that the show's "story creates a pervading sense of unease [and paranoia], with much of what happens clearly intended as a metaphor for puberty. Despite its dry tone and the clean art style, the show can be disturbing, with rape and incest metaphors as well as body horror. This was a memorable, surreal and too short series". SFE also criticizes the anime adaptation for ending abruptly, which the author's entry finds "frustrating [but] not unique in anime adaptions of manga".
