= Sundome =

Japanese manga series

- First tankōbon volume cover

すんドめ
- Genre: Coming-of-age; Romantic comedy; Sex comedy
- Manga
- Written by: Kazuto Okada
- Published by: Akita Shoten
- English publisher: NA: Yen Press
- Magazine: Young Champion
- Original run: May 23, 2006 – October 13, 2009
- Volumes: 8
- Live-action film
- Directed by: Daigo Udagawa
- Produced by: Haruto Jun
- Released: November 20, 2007
- Runtime: 81 minutes
- Live-action film

Sundome 2
- Directed by: Daigo Udagawa
- Released: May 3, 2008
- Runtime: 95 minutes
- Live-action film

Sundome 3
- Directed by: Daigo Udagawa
- Released: December 22, 2008
- Runtime: 85 minutes
- Live-action film

Sundome 4: The Final
- Directed by: Daigo Udagawa
- Released: November 6, 2009
- Runtime: 70 minutes
- Live-action film

Sundome New
- Directed by: Kazuhiro Yokoyama
- Released: April 22, 2017
- Runtime: 78 minutes
- Live-action film

Sundome New 2
- Directed by: Kazuhiro Yokoyama
- Released: April 24, 2017
- Runtime: 73 minutes
- Television drama
- Directed by: Kenichi Kudan
- Written by: Cha Kondō
- Original network: Abema TV
- Original run: November 1, 2023
- Episodes: 6
- icon

Sundome (すんドめ) is a Japanese manga series written and illustrated by Kazuto Okada. It was serialized in Akita Shoten's seinen manga magazine Young Champion from 2006 to 2009, with its chapters collected in eight tankōbon volumes. It was adapted into four live-action films released from 2007 to 2009 and two more released in 2017. A live-action television drama miniseries was released in 2023. The manga is licensed in North America for English release by Yen Press.

== Plot ==
The story is centered on a 15-year-old high school student named Hideo Aiba (Atsushi Ninomya), a member of a school club called the Roman Club. (ROMAN here is a rendering of romance, vernacular fiction; the club's supposed purpose is the search for ghosts, UFOs, and the paranormal.) The story centers around his transactional relationship with a girl named Kurumi Sahana (Akane Suzuki). Most of the events begin as an outing of the Roman Club. Occasionally, Hideo will be out on his own with Kurumi. This is usually at night, serving to contrast the playful daytime events.

== Characters ==
Hideo Aiba (相羽英男, Aiba Hideo)
Hideo has short black hair and a small build. He is the new Roman Club president, and is Kurumi's voluntary plaything. His physical strength and bravery are both lacking in the beginning. Kurumi uses her reward system to get Aiba to change his cowardly and lackluster habits. As time progresses, his strength and endurance improve as Hideo jogs and works out to handle his frustration. Hideo maintains strong feelings for Kurumi, and does anything she tells him to do to get a "reward", going so far as to resist a judo arm-bar from the schools martial arts champ. His feelings lead to jealousy when other men grope Kurumi, or talk to her privately, or buy her things he cannot afford. This leads Hideo, along with his workouts, to strive for self-improvement.
Kurumi Sahana (早華胡桃, Sahana Kurumi)
The school's mysterious new transfer student. She is quiet and self content, but is also Hideo's "master". She has a frail frame, short black hair, a small bust, and few inhibitions. Kurumi plays at naivety, yet is well aware of Hideo's attraction to her. She joins the Roman club to be closer to Hideo. She tortures Aiba by getting him to the brink of orgasm, but refuses to let him ejaculate. She lives alone, only letting Hideo in on this secret. Not much is known about her past or her family background except it is hinted that her parents are dead and that she lived in an orphanage with her siblings.
Katsu Toshitsuku (年着勝, Toshitsuku Katsu)
Member of the Roman Club. He has a peeping fetish, and is often called an octopus face. His opaque glasses conceal his eyes most of the time. For reasons unexplained, he is balding in his teenage years. His classmates frequently use this to insult him. Katsu develops feelings for Kyouko by vol. 2. He first reveals this overtly when attacking Yasu for exploiting Kyouko sexually. He again defends her in vol. 4 by taking a punch from Yasu that was meant for Kyouko.
Tatsuya Yatsu (八津達也, Yatsu Tatsuya)
Member of the Roman Club. He has a leg fetish, and a doll he admires named "Aimu", alt "Ayu". He is a coward, frequently running away from anything threatening. He has some real world skills, as seen in Ch. 5. He volunteers to cut the schools security cameras and disable the locks so the Roman club can swap sofas with the faculty lounge. He also lasted the longest before being found in the Roman club's hide and seek game.
Ex-president
The former President of the Roman Club. At 17, he is the only member of the Roman club who is not a freshman. He was expelled after being seduced into anal sex by an O.B. assassin. His preference is well known by those around him. Members of the Roman club use this to tease the Ex-president. He responds by attempting to bite the offender's head, declaring, "all those who make fun of my preference must be eaten!". In the manga Ibitsu, written by the same author, the Ex-president makes some appearances being referred as "Moto".
Kyouko (京子, Kyōko)
A large-breasted and frivolous girl in the B class. She has bleached hair and tanned skin. Her temperament and lack of understanding leads her to trouble. Kyouko's attitude can change suddenly, from wanting to kill to wanting to befriend. This, combined with her outgoing personality and energetic lifestyle lead her to trouble. She was the most popular girl in school with the boys until Kurumi's arrival. She is not an official member of the Roman Club, but she goes to the club room to read the manga. She has a moral ambiguity, displaying immorality and decency at the same time. Kyouko always argues with Katsu. She has no idea of his feelings for her. Kyouko likes 1000 yen notes, and demands them for her ideas, services, and bets.
The O.B.
A masked alumnus of the Roman Club. By refusing to give up his boyhood dreams or give in to the lure of women, he was permitted to use the Roman clubs vast connections to get into Pro Baseball. He has a strong, athletic body and leads the Roman club in exercises during his visit. He reveals to the Club that their activities are monitored and he knows what they have done and talked about during their time there. In a cryptic dialog, Kurumi asks if the Club's connections have informed him about her. He responded, "in a way". What this means or even pertains to was not revealed at the time. Amusingly, the O.B. gives away that the ex-president's seduction is a joke to the other O.B.s. [O.B. = Old Boy, alumnus]. Hideo challenges the O.B. to a test of courage against the gym's high dive. He wins, as the O.B. has an intense fear of heights.
Yasu (ヤス, Yasu)
A tall student with tan skin, bleached hair, and a light beard. His posse of similar men congregate to brag about sexual exploits with various women. The Roman Club gets into a brawl with this posse after Katsu punches Yasu for exploiting Kyouko. At a karaoke bar, he attacks Kyouko for insulting his small "microphone", but Katsu protects Kyouko by taking his punch in the face. Yasu is subsequently tossed out of the bar.

== Media ==
=== Manga ===
Sundome is written and illustrated by Kazuto Okada. It was serialized in Akita Shoten's seinen manga magazine Young Champion from May 23, 2006, to October 13, 2009. Eight bound volumes of the manga have been released by Akita Shoten between November 20, 2006, and November 20, 2009. It has been licensed in English by Yen Press, which released the volumes between January 2008 and December 2010. It has also been licensed in Taiwan by Ever Glory Publishing and in Spain by Editorial Ivrea.

=== Film ===
The manga was adapted into four films. All the films are directed by Daigo Udagawa. The first film premiered in Japanese cinemas on November 20, 2007. The first film was released on a DVD on December 21, 2007, the second DVD on March 23, 2008, the third DVD on December 22, 2008, and the fourth DVD on November 6, 2009. The box set containing all four movies was released on November 6, 2009. Two other films, titled Sundome New and Sundome New 2, were released in April 2017.

=== Drama ===
A live-action television drama miniseries was announced on October 17, 2023. It is directed by Kenichi Kudan with scripts written by Cha Kondō. All six episodes premiered on Abema TV on November 1, 2023.

== Reception ==
Manga Worth Reading's Ed Sizemore commends the first volume's artwork saying, "Where it really stands out is in the emotionally (sexual or otherwise) intense moments. Here Okada uses true blacks and darker greys to really contrast these panels with the normal narrative panels. It’s an effective device that intuitively lets the reader know something significant is happening. Also, Okada is an excellent cheesecake artist. This is best seen in those moments when Hideo is awash in desire as he is looking at Sahana. Okada draws her in such a way that we can feel his desire as well." A review of the second volume by Sizemore commented on the "difficult, almost stomach-churning" relationship between Kurumi and Hideo. He further commented that Hideo "reminds me of the Mark Heard lyric, "You will weather well, in a climate of love." I can't help but hope that he will rises from the ashes of this relationship. I want him to make friends with people who will genuinely care for him and nurture him to become a well-rounded, well-adjusted man". Sizemore commented that "the Roman club is a twisted version of Genshiken for its members". He also commends Okada's artwork, stating that he is "a master of communicating emotional content. Not just the simple emotions of happiness and sadness, but even the complex emotions of desire, pensiveness, gentleness, and frustration. In volume three, we get to see him be visually playful when drawing the student council president and his many exaggerated facial expressions". On the fifth volume, Sizemore commented "I love the scene where Katsu is showing Kyouko how to get to the next level of a game. It's refreshing and cute to see them bond like that".

For all its kinks and fetishes, Sundome is surprisingly dull when it comes to plot ideas: a challenge against the brawny martial arts club, a creepy nighttime ghost hunt, a sneaky attempt to get into the nurse's office, and other paint-by-number school comedy scenarios. Enjoyment of the story is further hindered by the crowded, frenzied layouts: a lot of essential action is crammed into painfully small panels, with big blocks of dialogue to make things even more visually strained. And if that doesn't hurt your eyes enough, then the designs surely will: it's a fool's errand trying to tell the male characters apart (as if they even had personalities in the first place), and the only way Kurumi would be considered attractive is if you have a thing for oddly skinny girls.

— Carlo Santos, Anime News Network

Kevin Leathers reviewing for the UK Anime Network criticizes the artwork for exaggerating "certain aspects of the body". He commented that the artwork of the manga "seem to take cues from series like GTO and every other manga that has characters drawn in over the top ways to show how crazy they are acting". Comic Book Resources's Danielle Leigh commented on the manga's art, saying "[it] is very disturbing since Kurumi really is just a young adolescent girl and Hideo a very young man — seeing them depicted so graphically bothers me, but what bothers me more is knowing this comics' primary goal is to titillate its audience through these depictions, and because I think it does do more than that I can't simply dismiss it because I dislike its sexualized representations of young adults". Pop Culture Shock's Erin Finnegan criticizes the manga by saying "I found the book neither funny nor titillating. Everything is toned too dark, and the characters designs are unappealing". Jason Thompson, in his online appendix to Manga: The Complete Guide, states that the manga is "like a porn film (or porn manga) which never quite gets to the money shot". He further commented that "love comedy fans will shy away from the general mood of degradation, not to mention the grotesque art, but to its credit the manga never pretends to be cute; it's florid sex-obsession and adolescent angst from beginning to end, and gradually it turns into a psychodrama about Kurumi's upbringing and the connection between these two lonely souls".

Despite the fact that most manga released in the U.S. share the more standard art styles seen in popular shojo, shonen, and seinen series, there are also plenty of Japanese artists using a more 'comicky' style. Each of these styles usually lends itself to the particular theme of the artist’s story and I can appreciate each style for what it accomplishes. The 'comicky' style of 'noodle-limbs' and over-exaggerated facial expressions in nearly every panel is commonly seen in comedies and it works well enough. Being a comedy, Okada's 'comicky' art style should work well with Sundome, but the story is also very provocative. Much of this book revolves around sexual situations and fanservice, which I don't feel works as well with a 'comicky' art style. Okada's characters seem flat, and that creates stiff looking characters. This causes problems because female depictions tend to work against the feeling of sexiness their actions try to evoke. Perhaps with time Okada's skill will increase, giving better flow to the art and story. But for now, the art and story seem to wrestle with each other during the sexual situations.

— Matthew Alexander, Mania.com

The Japan Times's Mark Schilling condemns the first Sundome film for trying to be a pink film by illustrating "its fetishistic eroticism and raunchy sense of humor" through "Atsushi Ninomiya as the hugely frustrated hero, behave as much as possible like the manga originals, which involves much exaggerated posing, moaning, howling and other hormone-driven behavior".

== See also ==
- Ibitsu, another manga series from the same author
