= Kimodameshi =

Japanese group activity to test courage

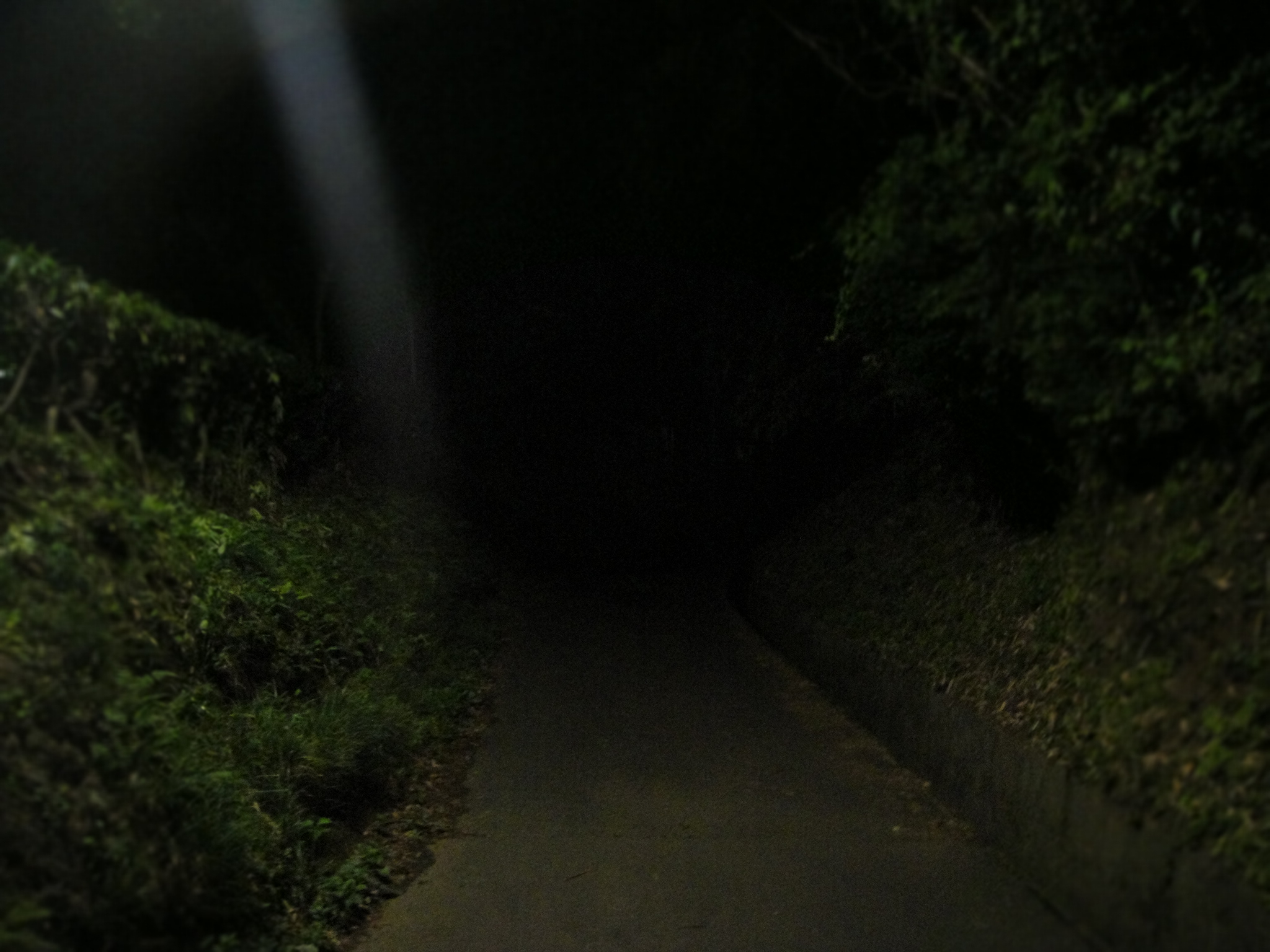
Silk Road in Yarimizu, Hachioji City, Tokyo

Kimodameshi (肝試し or きもだめし, pronounced [kʲimodaꜜmeɕi]; lit. "testing one's liver"), known in English as a test of courage, is a Japanese activity in which people explore frightening and potentially dangerous places to build up courage.

At night, usually during the summer, a group of people visits an ominous place such as a cemetery, haunted house, or secluded forest path to carry out specific missions there. The exercise teaches the group that, working together, they can overcome their fear.

== History ==
In Ōkagami, a Japanese historical tale from the early 12th century, it is written that Emperor Kazan sent three of Fujiwara no Kaneie's sons to a house purportedly haunted by oni at 3 o'clock in the morning; only Fujiwara no Michinaga succeeded in visiting the house, returning with a sword-damaged wooden post as evidence. This suggests that the idea of a "test of courage" had existed near the end of Japan's Heian period.

== Modern day ==
Kimodameshi may be overseen and carried out by school clubs or summer camps. In such instances, some preparation may be involved, and others may assume the role of scaring the participants.

=== Law ===
Without proper consideration, kimodameshi can result in crimes being committed, such as trespassing (per Article 130 of the Penal Code of Japan), vandalism (Article 261), and intimidation or coercion of those unwilling to participate (Articles 222 and 223).

== See also ==
- Ghost hunting
- Haunted house
- Hyakumonogatari Kaidankai
- Kaidan, Japanese ghost stories
- Legend tripping
