= Night Film =

2013 novel by Marisha Pessl

- Author: Marisha Pessl
- Language: English
- Genre: Mystery, Thriller, Horror, Noir, Experimental Fiction, Contemporary
- Published: 2013
- Publisher: Random House
- Publication place: United States
- Media type: Print (hardcover)
- Pages: 602 (Hardcover edition)
- ISBN: 978-1400067886

Night Film is a mystery thriller by Marisha Pessl, published by Random House. The novel was a finalist 2013 Shirley Jackson Award and was ranked sixth on The New York Times Bestseller’s list in September 2013 following its release in August 2013.

== Interactive elements ==
The novel uses screenshots of an author-created web page and involves an app called "Night Film Decoder" that is used to scan particular images used throughout the text to unlock additional text, PDF, video, and audio files which augment the text. Reviewers who rated the novel unfavorably stated that Pessl's inclusion of the decoder was a drawback of the novel.

== Plot ==
Ashley Cordova, the daughter of legendary reclusive director Stanislas Cordova, takes her own life. With the belief that Stanislas Cordova was heavily involved in her death, disgraced investigative journalist Scott McGrath reluctantly teams up with exuberant aspiring actress Nora Halliday and the mysterious and aloof Hopper to determine what really happened. Throughout the investigation the trio interview a variety of people who were closely associated with both Cordova and his daughter, only to discover that the truth of what happened may be beyond natural, scientific explanation.

== Reviews and criticism ==
Writing for the New York Times, Joe Hill said: "No one can accuse Marisha Pessl of unfamiliarity with the tools of the modern thriller. With pages of faked-up old photos, invented Web sites and satellite maps, Night Film — Pessl's second novel, following Special Topics in Calamity Physics (2006) — asserts itself as a multimedia presentation more than an old-fashioned book." Hill notes that despite some of the clunky lines and oddly italicized sentences, the novel "has been precision-engineered to be read at high velocity, and its energy would be the envy of any summer blockbuster."

Meg Wolitzer wrote: "In the novel's best moments, reading this book is like sitting in a movie theater in wraparound darkness, feeling a deep chill that's part air conditioning, part anticipation." Wolitzer noted that, while Pessl's environments and scenes are beautifully rendered in the text, her characters fall flat. However, despite the plot's plainness, and the characters' lack of personalities, Wolitzer believed that "Marisha Pessl had an extremely cool and intricate idea for a novel, and ultimately it works. I was totally happy to sit in the darkness until the very last page, and I didn't move a muscle until the lights came up."

Writing for Vulture, Nitsuh Abebe called the book "a giddily creepy thriller," as well as "a kind of Franken-thriller, 15 percent bookish rumination and 85 percent B-movie charm and strewed with plenty of familiar tropes: mental hospitals, child murder, creepy dolls, witchcraft, Satan worship, secret BDSM sex clubs, the works."

Ron Charles, writing for The Washington Post, said of Pessl: "Her maniacally clever new novel is predicated upon a vast fictional oeuvre of terror that she’s sutured onto the body of American film. Like some unholy trinity of Alfred Hitchcock, Quentin Tarantino and Orson Welles, her Cordova is a monomaniacal genius who creeps into the darkest crevices of the human psyche."

Despite the praise that some critics gave Pessl, other critics felt that she did not successfully write a compelling mystery novel. Janet Maslin wrote that, in addition to purple prose, "credibility problems plague Ms. Pessl from the moment she first toots the Cordova horn. His films sound terrible, at least as they are described here. . . His last known interview, granted to Rolling Stone in 1977, is arrogant and pompous even for that magazine and time." Maslin also does not believe that the interactive aspects of the novel are effective, and she views them as "a badly executed, distracting gimmick" that the audience is not guaranteed to want or enjoy.

Writing for the Los Angeles Review of Books, Maggie Doherty called the book "inexpertly plotted and peppered with screenshots . . . not an absorbing reading experience but an alienating one." She also believed that "Night Film is a novel for the digital age, but if this is the kind of fiction our age produces, then these are dark times indeed," and she linked Night Film to the death of the novel.

== Adaptation ==
In September 2013, it was announced that Chernin Entertainment had optioned the rights to adapt Night Film to film, with Rupert Wyatt directing from a script by Roberto Aguirre-Sacasa. However, there have been no further updates on the adaptation.
