= Young Champion =

Japanese manga magazine

- Categories: Seinen manga
- Frequency: Semimonthly
- Circulation: 100,000
- Founded: 1988
- Company: Akita Shoten
- Country: Japan
- Based in: Tokyo
- Language: Japanese
- Website: www.akitashoten.co.jp/youngchampion

Young Champion (Japanese: ヤングチャンピオン) is a Japanese seinen manga magazine. The magazine was established in 1988. It is published by Akita Shoten, and has its headquarters in Tokyo.

== History ==
The original chief editor was Kabemura. Young Champion Retsu, launched in 2006, and Bessatsu Young Champion, launched in September 2014 are two spin-off magazines. Another spin-off that launched in November 2019, Dokodemo Young Champion, ended in May 2026 after it became too large to be sold in some digital retailers.

== Manga series ==
- Alien Nine by Hitoshi Tomizawa (1998–1999)
- Babel II: The Returner by Takashi Noguchi
- Battle Royale by Masayuki Taguchi and Koushun Takami
- Battle Royale: Angels' Border by Mioko Ōnishi and Koushun Takami
- Battle Royale II: Blitz Royale (BRII ブリッツ ロワイアル) by Hitoshi Tomizawa and Koushun Takami (2003–2004)
- Black Joke by Rintaro Koike and Masayuki Taguchi
- Cutie Honey Seed by Go Nagai and Komugi Hoshino
- Gaki Rock by Daiju Yamauchi
- Gichi Gichi-kun (ギチギチくん) by Suehiro Maruo
- Hangure: Roppongi Matenrou no Requiem
- Ibitsu by Kazuto Okada
- Ikebukuro West Gate Park (池袋ウエストゲートパーク) by Ira Ishida and Sena Aritō (2001–2004)
- Inugami Hakase (犬神博士) by Suehiro Maruo
- Jank Runk Family (ジャンク・ランク・ファミリー) by Hiroshi Takahashi (September 2016 - ongoing)
- Jingi by Ayumi Tachihara
- Kuzu!! by Dai Suzuki
- Love Junkies by Kyo Hatsuki
- Schoolmate by Yuki Azuma
- Sundome by Kazuto Okada
- Tanpen-Renai by Fumi Kanai
- Tōhai (凍牌) by Kōji Shinasaka
- Warau Kyūketsuki (笑う吸血鬼) by Suehiro Maruo (1998–1999, 2003)
- Young Black Jack by Yū-Go Ōkuma and Yoshiaki Tabata (2011–2019)
