= Marisha Pessl =

American writer

- Born: October 26, 1977 (age 48); Michigan
- Education: Barnard College
- Writing career
- Genre: Literary fiction
- Website: marishapessl.com

Marisha Pessl (born October 26, 1977) is an American writer known for her novels Special Topics in Calamity Physics, Night Film, Neverworld Wake, and Darkly.

== Early life ==
Pessl was born 1977 in Clarkston, Michigan, to Klaus, an Austrian engineer for General Motors, and Anne, an American homemaker. Pessl's parents divorced when she was three, and she moved to Asheville, North Carolina with her mother and sister. Pessl had an intellectually stimulating upbringing, recalling that her mother read "a fair chunk of the Western canon out loud" to her and her sister before bed, and entered her in lessons for riding, painting, jazz, and French. She was also a fan of The Chronicles of Narnia, A Wrinkle in Time, and the Nancy Drew books.

Pessl started high school at the Asheville School, a private, co-educational boarding school, but graduated from Asheville High School in 1995. She attended Northwestern University for two years before transferring to Barnard College.

== Career ==
After graduating, she worked as a financial consultant at PricewaterhouseCoopers, while writing in her free time. After two failed attempts at novels, Pessl began writing a third novel in 2001 about the relationship between a daughter and her controlling, charismatic father. Pessl completed the novel, titled Special Topics in Calamity Physics, in 2004 and it was published in 2006 by Viking Penguin to "almost universally positive" reviews, translated into thirty languages, and eventually becoming a New York Times Best Seller. Kirkus Reviews called it "sharp, snappy fun for the literary-minded." Peter Dempsey writing for the Guardian, despite giving it a mixed review overall, called it "a page-turning murder mystery with a gratifyingly complex plot, a dizzying Usual Suspects-style narrative with nods to detective novelists conventional (Agatha Christie) and unconventional (Carlo Emilio Gadda). On a second reading, what appeared to be a high-school tale spatchcocked on to the story of an amateur detective is seen to be a ground-laying exercise of immense skill."

Pessl's second novel, Night Film, a psychological literary thriller about a New York investigative journalist looking into the apparent suicide of the daughter of a renowned filmmaker ("a fictional mash-up of Stanley Kubrick, Roman Polanski and David Lynch"), was published by Random House on August 20, 2013. It was ranked sixth on The New York Times Bestseller’s list following its release.

Pessl's third novel, Neverworld Wake, was released on June 5, 2018. It is described as a "psychological suspense novel with a sci-fi twist." It is set in Watch Hill, Rhode Island. Pessl said in an interview, "I was working on my next adult novel, and I had this little germ of an idea about these five teenagers who used to be friends coming together in a sort of Agatha Christie-style, claustrophobic mansion type setting where they’re stuck. And at the time, I was very much interested in the brain and the consciousness and what’s real and what isn’t, so I definitely started going down this rabbit hole of trapping them and having them stuck in a way that went beyond anything Agatha Christie ever came up with."

== Writing style ==
Writing for Vulture, Nitsuh Abebe said, "Any reader of Pessl’s novels will notice she’s a lover of puzzles and secrets, hidden connections and buried clues."

== Other projects ==
Pessl was also a contributing musician to The Pierces' third studio album, Thirteen Tales of Love and Revenge, released in 2007. She is credited in the liner notes as having played the French horn on track 9 titled "The Power Of..."

== Personal life ==
Pessl married neurosurgeon David Gordon on February 28, 2015. They have three children – Winter, born in 2015, Avalon, born in 2017, and Raine, born in 2019.

== Works ==
=== Novels ===
- —— (2006). Special Topics in Calamity Physics (paperback 1st ed.). Penguin. ISBN 9781101218808.
- —— (2013). Night Film (hardcover 1st ed.). Random House. ISBN 9780307368225.
- —— (2018). Neverworld Wake (hardcover 1st ed.). Delacorte Press. ISBN 9780399553929.
- —— (2024). Darkly (hardcover ed.). Delacorte Press. ISBN 9780593706558.
