= Special Topics in Calamity Physics =

2006 novel by Marisha Pessl

- First US edition
- Author: Marisha Pessl
- Language: English
- Genre: Murder mystery novel
- Publisher: Viking Press
- Publication date: 2006
- Publication place: United States
- Media type: Print (Hardback & Paperback)
- Pages: 519
- ISBN: 0-670-03777-X
- OCLC: 62755674
- Dewey Decimal: 813/.6 22
- LC Class: PS3616.E825 S67 2006

Special Topics in Calamity Physics (2006) is the debut novel by American writer Marisha Pessl.

== Background ==
Pessl wrote three drafts of the book, telling Kenyon Review that "each draft took about a year. It wasn’t so much that I was revising Blue’s voice or the language, but that I wanted to make sure the mystery worked perfectly, that all the twists and turns really worked. Writing from the standpoint of an unreliable narrator, you as the author have to know exactly what’s going on at all times. You have to have a really firm handle on what all of the characters are doing, even if your narrator doesn’t understand. That was really the challenge of this book. And it took two or three drafts to figure that out."

The book was first published in August 2006 by Viking Press, a division of Penguin Group, and was a subject of a bidding war that ended in a sale for six figures.

== Plot ==
Blue van Meer is a book-obsessed, erudite teenager. She is the daughter of itinerant and arrogant academic Gareth van Meer, who, after the death of his amateur lepidopteran-catching wife (and Blue's mother), never manages to keep his daughter at a high school for more than a semester due to their constant moving from city to city. During Blue's senior year, however, they settle in the sleepy town of Stockton, North Carolina. She starts to attend the St. Gallway School and befriends a group of popular, rich, and mysterious teenagers called the Bluebloods. The Bluebloods are also close friends with the film-studies teacher at St. Gallway, Hannah Schneider, a perplexing woman, who intrigues Blue. After Schneider dies, seemingly by suicide, Blue is left to determine why.

== Style and format ==
=== Literary references ===
The book is written in the style of the syllabus for an English Literature course and includes references as footnotes. The chapters are named after literary works like Othello, A Portrait of the Artist as a Young Man, Wuthering Heights, and Women in Love.

=== Non-existent literary references ===
While the book is replete with literary and cinematic references, some of these references, like "The Way of the Moth" and "One Night Stand" lead to non-existent sources.

== Critical reaction ==
The book received many positive reviews and was named one of "The 10 Best Books of 2006" by The New York Times.

Veronique de Turenne, reporting for NPR, said that Pessl had "a thrilling and fearless voice. A writing career is launched, like it or not, at warp speed."

Some negative reviews, including one in The Guardian, accused the text of being overly stylized and Pessl of having "a tin ear for prose".

== Awards and honors ==
It won the inaugural John Sargent, Sr. First Novel Prize in 2006.

== Film adaptation ==
In 2007, Variety reported that a movie version was in the works, to be produced by Scott Rudin and directed by Anna Boden and Ryan Fleck, the writing-directing team behind Half Nelson, however, as of 2021 the project has never progressed to filming.
