= List of animated television series of 2010 =

This is a list of animated television series first aired in 2010.

Title	Seasons	Episodes	Country	Year	Original channel	Technique
Adventure Time	10	283	United States	2010–18	Cartoon Network	Traditional
The Adventures of Chuck and Friends	2	39	United States; Canada	2010–12	The Hub	CGI
AI Football GGO	2	104	China	2010–19	CCTV	Traditional
Algeria, History and Civilization	1	52	Algeria	2010	Télévision Algérienne; Canal Algérie; A3; Beur TV; Dzaïr TV	Traditional
Alphablocks	5	121	United Kingdom	2010–2013 2025–present	CBeebies	CGI
Amar Chitra Katha	1	26	India	2010	Cartoon Network	
The Amazing Professor Ambrosius' Mansion	4	80	Brazil	2010	TV Rá-Tim-Bum	Flash
Angelo Rules	5	272	United States; France; United Kingdom	2010–present	France 3 (seasons 1–2); France 4 (season 3); Télétoon+ (seasons 4–present); Cartoon Network; Super RTL	CGI
Art with Mati & Dada	2	39	Italy	2010–14	Rai 3 Rai Yoyo	Flash
Artzooka!	3	357	Canada, Germany	2010–12	Kids' CBC, Nickelodeon	Live-action/Flash
La Asombrosa Excursión de Zamba	7	62	Argentina	2010–present	Pakapaka	Flash
Astro Plan	1	26	China	2010	Golden Eagle Channel	
The Avengers: Earth's Mightiest Heroes	2	52	United States	2010–12	Disney XD	Traditional
Babar and the Adventures of Badou	3	65	Canada; France; Luxembourg (seasons 1–2)	2010–15	TF1; YTV; Disney Junior	CGI
Balgar	5	29	Bulgaria	2010–present		Flash
Battle for Dream Island	6	112	United States	2010–present	YouTube	Flash
The Beach Crew	1	18	Australia	2010	KidsCo	
Ben 10: Ultimate Alien	3	52	United States	2010–12	Cartoon Network	Traditional
Berry and Dolly	6	85	Hungary	2010–present	Minimax	Flash
Bino and Fino	1	12	Nigeria	2010–present	YouTube	Flash
Biznes po-russki	1	6	Russia	2010	Expert TV	
Black Panther	1	6	United States	2010	BET	Flash
Bobo & Zets	9	31	Israel	2010	HOT VOD Young	CGI
Bolts and Blip	1	26	Canada; South Korea	2010–11	Teletoon; Vortexx	CGI
Brasil Futebol Clube	1	6	Brazil	2010	TV Rá Tim Bum	CGI/Live action
Bubble Bubble Cook	2	104	South Korea	2010–12	MBC	
Cantigas de Roda	1	13	Brazil	2010	TV Rá Tim Bum	Flash/Traditional
Captain Biceps	1	78	France	2010–11	France 3	Flash/Traditional
The Cat in the Hat Knows a Lot About That!	3	80	Canada; United Kingdom; United States	2010–18	Treehouse TV; Kids' CBC; CITV; PBS Kids	Flash
Chi Rho: The Secret	1	26	Germany	2010–11	KI.KA	Traditional
Chloe's Closet	2	52	United States (season 2); United Kingdom (season 1); Ireland; Netherlands; Germany; Turkey (season 2)	2010–14	PBS Kids Sprout; CITV; KiKA	Flash
Choum and Pulip School	1	6	South Korea	2010	EBS	Traditional
Chuck Chicken	2	52	Malaysia; China	2010	TV9; TV3	Flash
City Monsters	1	13	Spain	2010	Super3	Flash
City of Friends	2	52	Norway	2010	TV 2	CGI
Classic Tales	1	130	Spain; Australia	2010	ABC	Flash
Commander Clark	1	52	France	2010	France 5	Flash
The Daltons	2	191	France	2010–16	France 3	Traditional
Dance-A-Lot Robot	1	10	United States	2010	Playhouse Disney	CGI; Live action Flash
The Dating Guy	2	26	Canada	2010	Teletoon Detour	Flash
The Dibidogs	1	26	Finland; China	2010–12	MTV3; MTV3 Junior; CCTV-14	CGI
Dick Figures	6	54	United States	2010–15	YouTube	Flash
Doodlebops Rockin' Road Show	1	26	Canada	2010	Kids' CBC	Flash
Dragons et Princesses	1	10	France	2010	Canal+ Family	CGI
Dreamkix	1	26	South Korea	2010	SBS TV	CGI
Driver Dan's Story Train	2	102	United Kingdom	2010–12	CBeebies; Al Jazeera Children's Channel (MENA)	CGI
The Dukes of Broxstonia	3	30	Australia	2010–13	ABC3	Flash
Ek Tha Jungle	1	26	India	2010	Disney Channel	CGI
Enertips	1	26	Spain	2010	Super3	CGI
Everything's Rosie	4	105	United Kingdom	2010–17	CBeebies; Baraem TV (series 1–2)	CGI
La Fée Coquillette	1	78	France	2010	TF1	Flash
Fish Hooks	3	110	United States	2010–14	Disney Channel	Flash; Live action
The Fixies	6	305	Russia	2010–present	Russia-1 (2010–14); Bibigon; Carousel (2011–present); Russia-K (2014); Da Vinci; PLUSPLUS (2014–22)	CGI/Flash
Flipos	1	13	Chile	2010	Canal 13	CGI
Florrie's Dragons	1	52	United Kingdom; France; South Africa	2010–11	Playhouse Disney	Flash
G.I. Joe: Renegades	1	26	United States	2010–11	The Hub	Traditional
Gasp!	1	52	Australia; Hong Kong	2010–11	ABC3; Nine Network	Flash
Generator Rex	3	60	United States	2010–13	Cartoon Network	Traditional
Gombby's Green Island	2	52	Portugal	2010–12	Canal Panda	CGI
H2Ooooh!	1	26	Italy	2010	Rai 2	CGI
Handy Manny's School for Tools	1	19	United States; Canada	2010–11	Playhouse Disney	CGI
The Happets	1	52	Spain	2010	TV3	CGI
Happy Heroes	21	924	China	2010–present	CCTV-14	Flash
Hareport	1	26	France; Belgium	2010	TF1	CGI
Hero: 108	2	52	United States; Taiwan; Ireland; China; United Kingdom	2010–12	Cartoon Network; Kabillion	Flash
Hero Factory	1	11	United States; Denmark; China	2010–14	Nicktoons	CGI
The Hive	2	78	India; United Kingdom	2010–16	Disney Junior	CGI
Ibn Battuta: The Animated Series	1	13	Malaysia	2010	TV2	CGI
JoNaLu	2	26	Germany	2010–16	KI.KA; Nick Jr.	CGI
The Jungle Book	3	156	India; Germany; France	2010–20	Nickelodeon; TF1 (seasons 1–2); Piwi+ (season 3); ZDF	CGI
Kaeloo	5	241	France	2010–23	Canal+ Family (seasons 1–2); Télétoon+ (seasons 3–4); Canal+ Kids (season 5)	CGI
Kick Buttowski: Suburban Daredevil	2	54	United States	2010–12	Disney XD	Flash
Klumpies	1	26	Belgium	2010	Ketnet	CGI
Kumbh Karan	2	160	India	2010–11	Pogo	Flash
The Little Prince	3	78	France; Italy; Switzerland	2010–15	France 3 TSR; Rai 2 (seasons 1–2); Rai Yoyo (season 3)	CGI
The Little Record Shop	3	36	Germany	2010–13	Animax Germany	Flash
Lulu Zipadoo	2	104	France	2010	France 5	CGI
Mad	4	103	United States	2010–13	Cartoon Network	Live action Traditional; Flash; CGI; Puppet; Stop motion
Martha and Friends	1	6	United States; China	2010–12	Hallmark Channel	CGI
Mary Shelley's Frankenhole	2	20	United States	2010–12	Adult Swim	Stop motion
Maryoku Yummy	1	26	United States; Ireland; India	2010	The Hub	Flash
Marvo the Wonder Chicken	1	52	United Kingdom	2010	Disney XD	Flash
Mawqef Micro	2	42	Syria	2010	Addounia TV	
Mix Master: Final Force	1	39	South Korea; Singapore	2010–11	KBS2; Toonami	Traditional
Monkey See, Monkey Do	2	52	Canada; Israel	2010	TVOKids; Hop! Channel	CGI/Live action
Monster High	6	175	United States	2010–15	YouTube	Flash
Mr. Moon	1	52	Singapore; United Kingdom; Canada	2010	TVOKids; Knowledge Network; SCN; Playhouse Disney	CGI
Muddle Earth	2	26	United Kingdom	2010	BBC One; CBBC	Flash
My Friend Haechi	1	26	South Korea	2010–11	SBS TV	
My Life Me	1	26	Canada; France	2010–11	Télétoon; Teletoon; France 4 Canal J	Flash
My Little Pony: Friendship Is Magic	9	377	United States; Canada	2010–19	Discovery Family	Flash
The Mysteries of Alfred Hedgehog	1	26	France; Canada	2010	TVO; TFO; Knowledge Network; Radio-Canada Télévision; France 5	Flash/Traditional
Neighbors from Hell	1	10	United States	2010	TBS	Flash
The New Adventures of Hanuman	2	52	India	2010–11	Pogo	Flash
Newbie and the Disasternauts	3	39	Brazil	2010–12	TV Rá-Tim-Bum	Flash
NFL Rush Zone	3	65	United States	2010–14	Nicktoons	Traditional
Noodle and Doodle	2	26	United States	2010–11	Sprout; NBC Kids	Traditional/Live action
Octonauts	5	121	United Kingdom; Ireland	2010–present	CBeebies	CGI
Oops! I-Kooo		52	South Korea	2010	EBS1	CGI
Oscar, der Ballonfahrer	1	26	Germany	2010–11	KI.KA	
Oscar's Oasis	1	78	France; South Korea; United Kingdom	2010–11	Canal+ Family / Télétoon+ / TF1; EBS	CGI
Ouk an lavois para tou mi ehontos	1	14	Greece	2010–11	Mega Channel	Flash
Les P'tites Poules	1	32	France	2010	France 5	CGI
Pink Panther and Pals	1	26	United States	2010	Cartoon Network; Boomerang	Traditional
Pirates: Adventures in Art	1	22	Canada	2010–11	CBC Television	CGI
Planet Sheen	1	26	United States	2010–13	Nickelodeon (2010–11); Nicktoons (2012–13)	CGI
Pound Puppies (2010)	3	65	Canada; United States	2010–13	The Hub/Hub Network	Flash
Puppy in My Pocket: Adventures in Pocketville	1	52	Italy	2010–11	Italia 1	Flash
Quà tặng cuộc sống		4000+	Vietnam	2010–present	VTV1; VTV3	Flash
Regular Show	8	261	United States	2010–17	Cartoon Network	Traditional
The Ricky Gervais Show	3	39	United States; United Kingdom	2010–12	HBO; Channel 4/E4	Flash
Rob the Robot	2	104	Canada; Singapore; United Kingdom	2010–13	TVOntario; Knowledge Network; Radio-Canada; Access	CGI
Robotomy	1	10	United States	2010–11	Cartoon Network	Flash
Roll No. 21	1	14	India	2010	Cartoon Network	Flash
Samson et Néon	1	78	France	2010	France 3	
SciGirls	7	46	United States	2010–23	PBS Kids Go! (2010–12); PBS Kids (2015–23)	Flash/Live action
Scooby-Doo! Mystery Incorporated	2	52	United States	2010–13	Cartoon Network	Traditional
Sidekick	3	52	Canada	2010–13	YTV	Flash
Singhasan Battisi			India	2010	Pogo	
The Small Giant	1	52	France; China	2010	Gulli; CCTV-1	Traditional
Spike Team	3	78	Italy	2010–18	Rai 2 Rai Gulp	Flash
Stellina	1	26	France; Italy	2010	Rai 2 Canal+ Family	Traditional
Storybox		52	Portugal	2010	ZON Kids	Flash
Strawberry Shortcake's Berry Bitty Adventures	4	65	United States	2010–15	The Hub/Discovery Family	Stop Motion
Suckers	1	104	Spain	2010	Disney XD	CGI
Sym-Bionic Titan	1	20	United States	2010–11	Cartoon Network	Traditional
T-Pang Rescue	2		China; South Korea	2010	KBS2; CCTV-6	CGI
T.U.F.F. Puppy	3	60	United States	2010–15	Nickelodeon (2010–13); Nicktoons (2013–15)	Traditional
Take Two with Phineas and Ferb	1	20	United States; Canada	2010–11	Disney Channel	Flash/Live action
Tales of Tatonka	2	52	France	2010–11	TiJi; France 3 Piwi+	CGI
Tara Duncan	1	26	France; India	2010–11	M6; Disney Channel; Disney XD	Traditional
Tayo the Little Bus	8	208	South Korea	2010–present	EBS	CGI
Team Smithereen	1	26	United States	2010	Disney XD	CGI/Live action
Team Umizoomi	4	78	United States	2010–15	Nickelodeon; Nick Jr. Channel	Flash; CGI; Live action
Teen Days	1	26	Italy, France	2010	Rai 2, Disney Channel	Traditional
Die Tigerentenbande	2	26	Germany	2010–11	KI.KA	Traditional
Tinga Tinga Tales	2	52	United Kingdom; Kenya	2010–11	CBeebies	Flash
Tobi!	1	4	United States, Australia, Canada	2010	Nickelodeon, Treehouse TV	Flash
Tobot	19	392	South Korea	2010–23	JEI TV; Tooniverse	CGI
Toto Trouble	2	52	France	2010–12	M6	Traditional
Transformers: Prime	3	65	United States	2010–13	The Hub	CGI
Ugly Americans	2	31	United States; Canada	2010–12	Comedy Central	Flash
Uki	1	52	Belgium	2010	Club RTL; Ketnet	CGI
Vocabularry		32	United States	2010	BabyFirstTV	Flash
Vroomiz	3	78	South Korea	2010–16	EBS1	CGI
Wallace and Gromit's World of Invention	1	6	United Kingdom	2010	BBC One	Stop motion/Live action
Wild Animal Baby Explorers	3	52	United States, Singapore, China	2010–14	PBS	CGI/Live action
Wilson & Ditch: Digging America	2	20	United States	2010	pbskidsgo.org	CGI
Woozle & Pip	3	39	Netherlands	2010–15	KRO	Flash
Young Justice	4	98	United States	2010–22	Cartoon Network (2010–13); DC Universe (2019); HBO Max (2021–22)	Traditional
Yummy Toonies	1	104	France	2010	Gulli	Flash
Zakumi – The Animated Series	1	20	Hong Kong	2010	Tele 5	
Zevo-3	1	26	United States	2010–11	Nicktoons	Traditional
Zig & Sharko	4	312	France	2010–present	Canal+ Gulli; M6	Traditional; Flash (season 2)

Anime television series first aired in 2010
Title	Episodes	Country	Year	Original channel	Technique
Amagami SS	25	Japan	2010	JNN	Traditional
And Yet the Town Moves	12	Japan	2010		Traditional
Angel Beats!	13	Japan	2010		Traditional
Arakawa Under the Bridge	13	Japan	2010		Traditional
Arakawa under the Bridge × Bridge	13	Japan	2010		Traditional
B Gata H Kei	12	Japan	2010		Traditional
Baka and Test	13	Japan	2010		Traditional
Bakugan: Gundalian Invaders	39	Japan	2010–11	Teletoon	Traditional
Bakuman	25	Japan	2010–11		Traditional
Battle Spirits: Brave	50	Japan	2010–11		Traditional
The Betrayal Knows My Name	24	Japan	2010		Traditional
Beyblade: Metal Masters	51	Japan	2010–11	TV Tokyo	Traditional
Big Windup! Season 2	13	Japan	2010		Traditional
Black Butler II	12	Japan	2010		Traditional
Cat Planet Cuties	12	Japan	2010		Traditional
A Certain Magical Index II	24	Japan	2010–11		Traditional
Chu-Bra!!	12	Japan	2010		Traditional
Cobra the Animation	13	Japan	2010		Traditional
Dance in the Vampire Bund	12	Japan	2010		Traditional
Demon King Daimao	12	Japan	2010		Traditional
Digimon Fusion	30	Japan	2010–11		Traditional
Duel Masters Cross Shock	50	Japan	2010–11		Traditional
Durarara!!	24	Japan	2010		Traditional
Fortune Arterial: Akai Yakusoku	12	Japan	2010		Traditional
Gag Manga Biyori+	12	Japan	2010		Traditional
Giant Killing	26	Japan	2010		Traditional
Gokujō! Mecha Mote Iinchō Second Collection	51	Japan	2010–11		
Haiyoru! Nyaruani: Remember My Mr. Lovecraft	11	Japan	2010–11		Flash
Hakuoki: Demon of the Fleeting Blossom	12	Japan	2010		Traditional
Hakuoki: Record of the Jade Blood	10	Japan	2010		Traditional
Hanamaru Kindergarten	12	Japan	2010		Traditional
HeartCatch PreCure!	49	Japan	2010–11		Traditional
Heaven's Lost Property: Forte	12	Japan	2010		Traditional
Heroman	26	Japan	2010		Traditional
Hidamari Sketch × Hoshimittsu	12	Japan	2010		Traditional
Highschool of the Dead	12	Japan	2010		Traditional
House of Five Leaves	12	Japan	2010		Traditional
Hyakka Ryōran Samurai Girls	12	Japan	2010		Traditional
Ikki Tousen: Xtreme Xecutor	12	Japan	2010		Traditional
Iron Man	12	Japan	2010		Traditional
Jewelpet Twinkle	52	Japan	2010–11		Traditional
K-On!!	26	Japan	2010		Traditional
Kabushiki Kaisha Zoo	12	Japan	2010	NHK E	
Katanagatari	12	Japan	2010		Traditional
Keshikasu-kun	44	Japan	2010–13		
Kiss×sis	12	Japan	2010		Traditional
Ladies versus Butlers!	12	Japan	2010		Traditional
The Legend of the Legendary Heroes	24	Japan	2010		Traditional
Lilpri	51	Japan	2010–11		Traditional
Magic Kaito	12	Japan	2010–12		Traditional
Maid Sama!	26	Japan	2010		Traditional
Marie & Gali ver.2.0	30	Japan	2010–11		
Mayoi Neko Overrun!	13	Japan	2010		Traditional
Mitsudomoe	13	Japan	2010		Traditional
Miyanishi Tatsuya Gekijō: Omae Umasō da na	20	Japan	2010	TV Tokyo	
MM!	12	Japan	2010	AT-X	Traditional
Motto To Love Ru	12	Japan	2010		Traditional
Night Raid 1931	13	Japan	2010		Traditional
Nodame Cantabile: Finale	11	Japan	2010		Traditional
Nura: Rise of the Yokai Clan	24	Japan	2010		Traditional
Occult Academy	13	Japan	2010		Traditional
Ōkami Kakushi	12	Japan	2010		Traditional
Okami-san and Her Seven Companions	12	Japan	2010		Traditional
Omamori Himari	12	Japan	2010		Traditional
Oreimo	12	Japan	2010		Traditional
Otome Yōkai Zakuro	13	Japan	2010		Traditional
Panty & Stocking with Garterbelt	26	Japan	2010–present		Traditional
Penguin no Mondai MAX	50	Japan	2010–11		
Princess Jellyfish	11	Japan	2010		Traditional
Psychic Detective Yakumo	13	Japan	2010		Traditional
The Qwaser of Stigmata	24	Japan	2010		Traditional
Rainbow: Nisha Rokubō no Shichinin	26	Japan	2010		Traditional
Ring ni Kakero 1: Shadow	6	Japan	2010		Traditional
Scan2Go	52	Japan; South Korea	2010–11	SBS	Traditional
SD Gundam Sangokuden Brave Battle Warriors	51	Japan	2010–11		
Seitokai Yakuindomo	13	Japan	2010		Traditional
Sekirei: Pure Engagement	13	Japan	2010		Traditional
Sengoku Basara: Samurai Kings II	12	Japan	2010		Traditional
Shiki	22	Japan	2010		Traditional
Shimajirō Hesoka	101	Japan	2010–12		Traditional
Shin Koihime Musō: Otome Tairan	12	Japan	2010		Traditional
Shukufuku no Campanella	12	Japan	2010		Traditional
Sound of the Sky	12	Japan	2010		Traditional
Squid Girl	12	Japan	2010		Traditional
Star Driver	25	Japan	2010–11		Traditional
Stitch! ~Best Friends Forever~	29	Japan	2010–11		Traditional
Strike Witches 2	12	Japan	2010		Traditional
Super Robot Wars Original Generation: The Inspector	26	Japan	2010–11		Traditional
Tantei Opera Milky Holmes	12	Japan	2010		Traditional
The Tatami Galaxy	11	Japan	2010		Traditional
Tegami Bachi Reverse	25	Japan	2010–11		Traditional
Togainu no Chi	12	Japan	2010		Traditional
Tono to Issho: 1-Funkan Gekijō	12	Japan	2010		Traditional
Working!!	13	Japan	2010		Traditional
The World God Only Knows	12	Japan	2010		Traditional
Yosuga no Sora	12	Japan	2010		Traditional
Yumeiro Patissiere SP Professional	13	Japan	2010		Traditional

== See also ==
- List of animated feature films of 2010
- List of Japanese animation television series of 2010
