= List of B Gata H Kei episodes =

B Gata H Kei, titled Yamada's First Time: B Gata H Kei in the English dub, is an anime television series from the manga of the same title written by Yoko Sanri. It was produced by Hal Film Maker. It premiered on the KBS and Tokyo MX television network on April 2, 2010, and ran weekly for 12 episodes. FUNimation has licensed the anime series, releasing it on DVD and Blu-ray on January 31, 2012, and later broadcasting it on the Funimation channel and uploading it to various broadband services.

The opening theme song for the series was "Oshiete A to Z" (おしえて A to Z) and its ending theme was "Hadashi no Princess" (裸足のプリンセス). Both theme songs are performed by Yukari Tamura, who voices the title character Yamada. A maxi single containing the two themes was released on April 28, 2010.

== Episode list ==
No.	Title	Original release date
1	"Boy Meets Girl. Please Give Me Your 'First Time'!!"; Transliteration: "Bōi Mītsu Gāru. Anata no 'Hajimete' Watashi ni Chōdai!!" (Japanese: ぼーい♂みーつ♀がーる あなたの「初めて」私にちょうだい!!)	2 April 2010
1	"After School Strategy! Shall We Start With A Kiss?"; Transliteration: "Hōkago Daisakusen! Toriaezu Kisu Shimasho?" (Japanese: 放課後大作戦! とりあえずキスしましょ?)	2 April 2010
We are introduced to Yamada, considered to be her high school's idol, and to her mission in life in high school: to obtain a hundred sexual partners. However, she is rather picky, and decides to concentrate on a guy named Takashi Kosuda, whom she meets at a bookstore while shopping for a dictionary; and her would-be classmate. She then steps her campaign up a notch by finding a way to go home with Kosuda so that she can "get him." She is able to even get into his room; and seemingly with his liberated sister Kazuki's "blessing." However, her inexperience scares her to death that she rushes out of Kosuda's house in haste.
2	"I Know! Let's Go to the Pool. You Want to See My Swimsuit Don't You!"; Transliteration: "Sō da! Pūru ni Ikō. Watashi no Mizugi, Mitai yo ne!" (Japanese: そうだ! プールに行こう 私の水着、見たいよねっ!)	9 April 2010
2	"A Rival Appears! Who is That F Cup!?"; Transliteration: "Raibaru Shutsugen! Dare yo? Ano F Kappu!?" (Japanese: ライバル出現! 誰よ?あのFカップ!?)	9 April 2010
Yamada continues to seduce Kosuda by inviting him over to the pool. For this, she selects a rather sexy swimsuit for him. Yamada's friend Miharu Takeshita was worried Yamada might steal her boyfriend, Daisuke Matsuo, but it didn't happen--instead, Matsuo-senpai and Kosuda become instant friends. Yamada enjoys riding with Kosuda on the water slide, but gets disappointed when she finds out Kosuda is afraid of heights, hence his clinging tightly to her. Kosuda manages to make up with Yamada during the fireworks display, when he hugged Yamada from out of the blue, taking Matsuo-senpai's suggestion. Now Yamada prepares for "the big moment" by buying tons of condoms, while Kosuda seems even scared to buy condoms for himself. Then, back at school, Yamada gets to know Mayu Miyano, a busty childhood friend of Kosuda's. She immediately considers her to be a rival, especially that she seems to be interested in him, and it looks like her entire family and Kosuda's family seems too friendly with each other. However, Yamada (with Miharu Takeshita always beside her) also gets to know that Kosuda has no idea about how she feels. Still insecure, Yamada goes to the absolute bottom of everything by talking to her, but in an unexpected turn of events, Yamada becomes her love consultant of sorts.
3	"Quickie in the Dark Room! Somewhat Dangerous Club Activities!?"; Transliteration: "Anshitsu de Kyūsekkin! Chotto Kiken na Bukatsudō!?" (Japanese: 暗室で急接近! ちょっとキケンな部活動!?)	16 April 2010
3	"Blazing Culture Festival! The School Queen is Yamada (Me)!!"; Transliteration: "Moeru Bunkasai! Gakuen no Joō wa Kono Watashi!!" (Japanese: 燃える文化祭! 学園の女王はこの山田（わたし）!!)	16 April 2010
When Yamada learns of Kosuda's membership in the photography club, and finds out that he is going to develop a few pictures in the dark room, she turns that into a sneaky scheme to "obtain his golden cherry." While the dark room only has the red light on, Yamada undresses and advances behind Kosuda, only to back off when he turns around, but then Yamada accidentally trips the plug to the red dark room lights when another student is heard. Kosuda fumbles around for the light switch and accidentally touches her bare breast, having no clue what he was touching. Disappointed, Yamada runs out of the room after Kosuda finds the switch to the normal room lights, but he catches up with her in his bicycle and offers her a ride home. Meanwhile, with the school festival approaching, Yamada volunteers to become the ghost in their class' haunted house, because she sees it as a chance to kiss Kosuda in the horror booth. Kosuda never came, but Yamada is invited by Misato to participate in a contest for the School Festival Queen. She narrowly wins over Kyoka Kanejō, a transfer student. Kosuda, who was watching the show, thinks her victory will make her more unattainable to him--not knowing that she is waiting for him at the traditional bonfire dance. After some hesitation, he decides to rush over to Yamada for a dance, much to her delight (though she denies her excitement at first), but he has to wait in line. When it was his turn to dance Yamada, the song is over. They still dance, anyway, for quite a while.
4	"Throbbing Christmas Eve. What Does a First Kiss Taste Like?"; Transliteration: "Tokimeki Seiya. Fāsuto Kisu-tte, Nan no Aji?" (Japanese: ときめく聖夜。ファーストキスって、なんの味?)	23 April 2010
4	"We Can't Go Home Like This! Let's Go to the Make-out Park!"; Transliteration: "Kono Mama ja Kaerenai! Icha Rabu Kōen ni Ikō yo!" (Japanese: このままじゃ帰れない! いちゃラブ公園に行こうよ!)	23 April 2010
Jealous of her sister Chika bringing home lots of cute guys as boyfriends almost every day, Yamada steps up again to seduce Kosuda, just in time for Christmas Eve. Yamada tries hard at the library to hint to Kosuda to ask her out, and he does. Kosuda's sister draws up a date plan. Kosuda and Yamada meet up, but nothing seems to go right. Kosuda gives Yamada some earrings, which she interprets as wanting sex, so she pulls Kosuda through the love hotel district, and starts scouting for cheap locations. Kosuda is very nervous but he attempts to kiss her, but is slow so Yamada tries to initiate one and practically gives him a massive headbutt. But their lips touch, and she runs away from Kosuda to hide somewhere. An overjoyed Kosuda decides to ditch the schedule his sister gave him and follow her, since that first kiss seems to have sealed his relationship with Yamada. She reports all progress to Takeshita, then goes out with Kosuda, waiting outside, to a love park, loaded with many couples hidden in the bushes making love. Yamada is thrilled as Kosuda is scared he might become an out-of-control beast should Yamada give the green signal. However, Kosuda finds out it's a total reversal, as Yamada is all geared up. However, inexperience kept on delaying "the main event," until it was eventually canceled because they found out that the park is filled with camera-shooting perverts.
5	"A Valentine of Sweat and Tears! Love(?) From Yamada is Put Into It"; Transliteration: "Ase to Namida no Varentain! Yamada yori Ai? o Komete" (Japanese: 汗と涙のバレンタイン! 山田より愛? を込めて)	30 April 2010
5	"Improve the Erotic Powers! It's My First Time Feeling This Sensation..."; Transliteration: "Migake Ero Pawā! Konna Kankaku, Hajimete na no..." (Japanese: 磨けエロパワー! こんな感覚, 初めてなの...)	30 April 2010
As Mayu Miyano tries in vain to give Kosuda the perfect Valentine's day chocolate cake (she gives it to his sister instead, thinking it is in return for the apples she gave her), Yamada, while getting a mound of chocolates herself, struggles to make even one box of chocolate for Kosuda--and even her best were unpalatable to fish. Kosuda reveals to Yamada the next day that the chocolates given anonymously through the mailbox were "of a unique taste." Then, one night, the Erogamisama (God of Sex) talks to Yamada personally in a dream, telling her that her sexual powers are decreasing. The Erogamisama then advises her to find a way to increase them. She then gets her idea from her classmate Mami Misato about not wearing underwear. She tries the idea the next day, but with some disastrous results. Kosuda finds out that Yamada was indeed not wearing any underwear, but he freaks out and runs away. But, after "releasing the tension" caused by the event, he then realizes that Yamada was indeed trying to show it to him, and it makes him happy. Yamada, on the other hand, simply panics and was quite disappointed.
6	"Kanejō Arrives! That Dazzle is Unforgivable!"; Transliteration: "Kanejō-san ga Kuru! Ano Kirakira ga Yurusenai!" (Japanese: 金城さんが来る! あのキラキラが許せない!)	7 May 2010
6	"Underneath That Rose-colored Smile... is Kanejō’s Dark Secret!!"; Transliteration: "Bara-iro no Egao no Ura ni...... Kanejō no Kuroi Himitsu!!" (Japanese: バラ色の笑顔の裏に...... 金城の黒い秘密!!)	7 May 2010
Looks like Yamada's obstacles in the way of Kosuda has multiplied by three--her sister Chika enrolls in the same school as her; and Mayu Miyano and Kyouka Kanejō, the girl who nearly beat her in last year's beauty contest, are now in the same class as she is! Setting Miyano aside for the moment, Kyouka is getting under Yamada's skin because of her charm and immense talent, envying her in the process, especially that she seems to be getting Kosuda's attention. Well, not that he is interested in her, but because she looks familiar, since she appears in the photography magazine he buys every month. Meanwhile, unknown to Yamada, Kyouka has not forgotten her stealing the School Festival Queen title, and it is her mission to exact revenge on her. In the process a dark, vengeful facade of the otherwise gentle-smiling beauty has been revealed. She has to defeat Yamada and reaffirm herself as the Beauty Queen of the Campus before her brother returns to Japan, since perfection is in the Kanejō family's traits. She plans to do so by stealing her boyfriend, whoever he is. However, her approach of asking her directly proved to be a fatal flaw and, besides, Yamada is already on her guard when Kyouka is nearby. But Kyouka has an even deeper secret she has to hide using very, very tight security (requiring her voice, pulse rate, retinal scan, and even a dozen doors of thick steel to gain access): she has a room filled with anything connected to her brother that helps her satisfy her needs caused by an extreme case of brother complex.
7	"A Huge Duel with School Swimsuits! I Definitely Won’t to Lose to You!"; Transliteration: "Sukumizu de Daikettō! Anta ni dake wa Zettai Makenai!" (Japanese: スク水で大決闘! アンタにだけは絶対負けない!)	14 May 2010
7	"Memories of a Summer Day... Yamada, Returns to the Wild!"; Transliteration: "Natsu no Hi no Omoide...... Yamada, Yasei ni Kaeru!" (Japanese: 夏の日の思いで...... 山田, 野生に帰る!)	14 May 2010
By now Yamada is battling a desperate "war" against the seemingly invincible Kyouka Kanejō. Kyouka even manages to beat Yamada, the fastest swimmer in her class, in a 50-meter freestyle swimming race, even with Yamada trying to cheat. Yamada even tries to enlist the help of her sister Chika, but when she took her to meet Kyouka, she and Chika became fast friends, much to Yamada's dismay. Meanwhile, summer break is coming, and Kosuda asks Yamada out to go somewhere for the summer break. Both see this as an opportunity, but there are hurdles. Part of those hurdles include a non-matching schedule between Yamada and Kosuda, resulting in the both of them not able to find a day reserved for themselves. And, this summer, Yamada got dumbstruck when she finds out Kosuda is out on a family trip, with Mayu Miyano's family! Imagining that Kosuda is getting all lovey-dovey with Miyano, Yamada goes after him, even earning an airsoft rifle in the process as a result of hitching a ride with some airsofters and joining them in an airsoft battle. Though Miyano was quite close to Kosuda, it was nothing romantic. When Yamada finally meets Kosuda while taking pictures of stars, a little clearing of minds led to Kosuda taking pictures of Yamada for the first time, though with a digital camera. Both Yamada and Kosuda were looking for a date, and they got it, under the stars.
8	"Yay, Field Trip! But We’re Not Alone Together..."; Transliteration: "Wāi, Shūgaku Ryokō da! Futarikkiri ni Narenakute..." (Japanese: わーーい, 修学旅行だ! 二人っきりになれなくて...)	21 May 2010
8	"About Yamada, I... am in for a Confusing and Bumpy Ride!"; Transliteration: "Ore, Yamada no Koto ga, Su... Suttamonda no Chindōchū!" (Japanese: 俺, 山田の事が, す... すったもんだの珍道中!)	21 May 2010
It is three days of field trip to Kyoto for Class 2-H, and Yamada and Kosuda see this as another means of confessing to each other. But the task at hand, namely sightseeing for their class report; as well as the entire class being there, is what's keeping them apart--though they really want to get this thing over with. Even with Yamada and Kosuda having to hire their own boat (as they were left behind), their nervousness kept them from confessing to each other. In short, for them, the entire field trip was a waste and a disaster; and their only photo together was ruined by a rowdy, out-of-control Misato intruding (she was so rowdy she nearly ordered a beer, which was tantamount to expulsion). However, Kosuda followed Yamada on her train ride home and did confess to her, despite getting stuck in the train door and the loud train's noise drowning his "I Love You." It took Miharu and a little thinking for her to get what was that "su" syllable meant, but when Kosuda finally tries to ask her about her reaction, she simply avoids him, even running away scared, because "she does not know anything about love, since she is into this only to get de-virginized."
9	"No Way! In Front of Everyone to See... I Never Said I Hate You..."; Transliteration: "Sonna! Minna no Miteru Mae de... Kirai Nante Ittenai jan... Aki" (Japanese: そんな! みんなの見てる前で... 嫌いなんて言ってないじゃん... 秋)	28 May 2010
9	"Hold an Athletic Festival! Just Do Whatever You Like..."; Transliteration: "Taiikusai ni Kakero! Suki ni Sureba Ii jan... Aki" (Japanese: 体育祭にかけろ! 好きにすればいいじゃん... 秋)	28 May 2010
As both Kosuda and Yamada are still reeling from what happened in Kyoto, a (not-so-) secret popularity contest among the boys (which results in a tie between Yamada and Kyouka) enables Kosuda to finally confess to Yamada in public. They were the talk of the town for a few days, and a real shocker for both Kyouka and Miyano. Yamada was pissed off with what Kosuda did, though she is secretly pleased with it. Only when both Yamada and Kosuda were appointed to the athletic meet committee were they able to talk and apologize to each other, nervousness and all, and despite Kosuda's denseness making Yamada angry. Yamada told Takeshita the news, but she only apologized in order to get laid, but Takeshita could see that she is in love with Kosuda. She is just running away because "she does not understand love at all, since she expected it to be fun." Kyouka, on the other hand, is boiling mad because, counting their School Festival beauty contest, Yamada beats her for the second time. On the day of the athletic meet, Yamada tries to dodge Kosuda, because she doesn't know how to face him. He is unavoidable, though, since he is the official photographer. Kosuda feels down because of this, but Matsuo-senpai came to encourage him by relaying what his girlfriend Miharu (Takeshita) is telling him about Yamada. As for Kyouka, she is at edge with Yamada, but she is keeping calm because her brother will be coming to see her. She loses her cool when they erupt on boyfriend issues, sparking an outright war during the juniors' shoulder war, despite them belonging to the same team. Meanwhile, a mysterious guy is taking pictures of that impromptu war. The guy is none other than Keiichi, Kyouka's brother and secret love interest. Much to Kyouka's horror, this instant darling-of-the-crowd of a young man has taken an interest in Yamada. Kosuda is worried, too: here's a handsome guy with a high-tech digital camera hitting effortlessly on Yamada. However, Yamada wants none of Keiichi, making Kyouka angrier for "humiliating her brother in front of a crowd." Later, somehow, Kosuda manages to score a date with Yamada, who ran to the storage room to hide from him. Now that Kosuda has asked her out for a date, she stops running away and happily resumes her cheerleader duties, as well as providing Kosuda a brief fanservice moment as he takes her picture.
10	"The Kanejō Family. The Celebrity Brother’s Dazzling Secret!"; Transliteration: "Kanejō-ke no Ichizoku. Serebu na Ani no Kirakira na Himitsu!" (Japanese: 金城家の一族. セレブな兄のキラキラな秘密!)	4 June 2010
10	"Falling in Love? Don’t Lay a Hand on My Man (Kosuda)!!"; Transliteration: "Koi Suru Tochū? Watashi no Kosuda ni Te o Dasu na!!" (Japanese: 恋する途中? 私の男（コスダ）に手を出すな!!)	4 June 2010
Both Kosuda and Yamada are going for another date, nagging worries and all. Kosuda is delayed unexpectedly, causing Yamada to go jumpy and grab the nearest guy she could get. Unfortunately, the second guy she grabbed was Keiichi. He then invited Yamada over to tea as an apology for what happened at the sports meet, with Kosuda, who caught up with them, looking like a chaperon. During tea Keiichi confesses to Yamada (and the more right now because he has heard from Kosuda that they are just dating), but gets rejected. However, her refusals get replaced by some deep thinking because, contrary to what she thinks of Keiichi, he is still a virgin (because Kyouka had all of those girls who have confessed to him removed by her guards)--and that's what Yamada is looking for! Yamada, though, thinks Keiichi is just tricking her. Overall, that, including Misato's unexpected entry, effectively ruins the date between Yamada and Kosuda. Kosuda pities himself again, while Yamada is just holding herself from choking Misato to death. Meanwhile, Kyouka is having nightmares of her beloved brother meeting up with Yamada and confessing to her for three days, only to find out that it’s true. As Kosuda is still clueless as to Yamada's intentions (which was later dispelled after seeking advice from Miyano,), Yamada tells details of the date to Takeshita, and now she concludes that she likes Kosuda, virgin or not. Meanwhile, Kyouka tries to earn payback against Yamada by stealing her boyfriend. Kyouka goes to all lengths to know everything about Kosuda, even from Miyano (and this disappoints her Erogamisama). The next day Kyouka begins to attract Kosuda. It failed, so she invites him to her house “for a photo shoot.” Yamada sees them, and goes bananas thinking Kyouka is inviting Kosuda over to her house to have sex. Later, Yamada catches sight of Kosuda leaving in Kyouka's familiar golden stretch limousine. At her house, Kyouka, with urgings from her own Erogamisama, seduces Kosuda. However, Ichihara-san, her nanny, catches Kyouka stripping in front of a freaked-out Kosuda, so she requests that she keeps this a secret from her brother. While Kyouka is distracted, Yamada arrives, entering via the window, to get Kosuda, because "she is still on the way there"--she is about to fall in love with him. Kyouka, meanwhile, now armed with sly tactics from her nanny, finds that Kosuda is gone.
11	"Year 2 Class H's Christmas Party. Take Me to the Bed"; Transliteration: "Ninen Etchigumi no Kurisumasu Ibu. Atashi o Beddo ni Tsuretette" (Japanese: 2年H組のクリスマス・イブ あたしをベッドにつれてって♥)	11 June 2010
11	"Kanejō-san is Watching. A "Bare" Broadcast Just Shy of the Limit!"; Transliteration: "Kanejō-san ga Miteru!? Genkai Girigiri "Nama" Hōsō!" (Japanese: 金城さんが見てる!? 限界ギリギリ『生』放送!)	11 June 2010
It's Christmas time again, and Kyouka invites everyone in the class to her family's grand Christmas party. Keiichi tells Kyouka to invite Kosuda over as well, much to her shock. Yamada has no interest in it at first, but gets lured in because of this "Secret Room" Misato is talking about. Kyouka has difficulty inviting her enemy Yamada, but it was solved when the latter demanded an invitation from her. The class, including their teachers, while awed by the party's grandness, finds it difficult to mingle with the rich people Kyouka also invited--save for Takeshita, who draws attention; and Misato, who lunges for Keiichi at will. Kyouka hears of this "Secret Room" thing from Misato, and she begins to suspect it could be her secret "Brother Room." Kyouka's panic arouses Keiichi's attention, so, as a result, she tells Yamada and Kosuda to get going, although letting her go seems to be a mistake. Meanwhile, Yamada and Kosuda break into a proper room and, albeit nervous, tries to seize the opportunity. Kyouka was shocked to know, through surveillance camera, that they entered HER room and "are trying to do it." Kyouka wants to stop them, but, in curiosity, has it recorded. A suspicious Kosuda draws the curtains around the bed, forcing Kyouka to go there by herself, even taking Takeshita along with her as a witness. Things are somewhat smooth sailing for Yamada and Kosuda until Kyouka's entry interrupts them. They were able to hide in the closet before Takeshita parts the curtains for her. The freaked-out Yamada and Kosuda's troubles, not to mention discovering that they are in Kyouka's room, are not yet over, as, after Yamada stupidly gives their position away by meowing, Kyouka is about to search her closet. But before catching the two red-handed, she hears the doors to the Brother Room open, and sees Miyano coming out of it; enabling Yamada and Kosuda to escape. As Kyouka recovers from fainting in her room, Miyano asks her how she made the Brother Room (because she wants one for Kosuda). Since there’s still “unfinished business,” Yamada asks Kosuda for a Christmas date, which he accepts. She asks him, though, to “slow down.” The aftermath of the party for the rest of the class is a zero; with Misato scoring a summons for faking a marriage contract.
12	"The World Revolves Around Us. Goodbye... B-Type H-Style"; Transliteration: "Bokura no Tame ni Sekai wa Mawaru. Sayonara... B Gata H Kei" (Japanese: 僕らのために世界は回る。さよなら... B型H系)	18 June 2010
12	"The Angel Yamada! Farewell B-Type H-Style!!"; Transliteration: "Tenshi ni Natta Yamada! Saraba B Gata H Kei!!" (Japanese: 天使になった山田! さらばB型H系!!)	18 June 2010
Looking at her bed, with the box of condoms Yamada and Kosuda left behind still on it, Kyouka ponders whether they really did "it." Keiichi still looks forward to propose yet again to Yamada, greatly disappointing his sister... Meanwhile, with both of their siblings somehow able to help them about sex, both Yamada and Kosuda are able to say to each other that they want to "do it." They go to a love hotel on Christmas Eve, despite the usual obstacles. With a porn video as an aid and with Kosuda starting things up, things seem to go on smoothly this time, until Yamada accidentally turns on the rotating bed, which was malfunctioning, throwing Kosuda off the bed, fracturing his ankle in the process, and getting him hospitalized. Yamada then thinks of a way to help Kosuda. Yamada then overhears two patients talking about nurses taking care of patients, so, albeit Miyano's sudden appearance, Yamada goes to Kosuda's hospital room in a sexy pink nurse's outfit. She has to hide, though, under Kosuda's sheets, when a real nurse comes in. Yamada thinks Kosuda got turned on by his nurse's comments so she hits him in the groin--but he was turned on because Yamada's face was near his crotch. Things are about to get underway a la "playing doctor" when Kosuda's nurse appears again. Kosuda will be discharged before New Year's Eve, and Yamada finds a chance there, because Kosuda will be home alone, as everyone will go out to pray at the shrine. When his classmates, including Yamada, stopped by his house on their way to the shrine, Yamada secretly stays behind, with Takeshita covering for her. Yamada sneaks into Kosuda's bath--but their attempt at "it" turns into failure yet again as Kosuda faints due to overexposure to hot water and "increased blood pressure." As the rest of the class goes to pray for good fortune, Yamada and Kosuda go to another shrine to pray. This time, they are being a couple is affirmed.
