= List of Psychic Detective Yakumo episodes =

Psychic Detective Yakumo (心霊探偵 八雲, Shinrei Tantei Yakumo) is a novel by Manabu Kaminaga published in Nihon Bungeisha with illustrations by Katoh Akatsuki and later in Kadokawa Bunko with cover illustrations by Yasushi Suzuki. The book has been adapted into two manga series, a live-action drama series and a stage play.

== Episode list ==
No.	Title	Original release date	English release date
1	"The Forbidden Room"; Transliteration: "akazu no ma" (Japanese: 開かずの間)	October 3, 2010	April 18, 2013
After visiting an abandoned building, one of Haruka Ozawa's friends appears to be possessed by a spirit, and another commits suicide. In desperation she turns to Yakumo Saitou, a lackadaisical college student who is rumored to have supernatural abilities. Born with one red eye through which he can communicate with the dead, he agrees to solve Haruka's mystery, for a fee. Haruka remains skeptical, until Yakumo conveys a message to her from her dead twin sister. Yakumo begins to investigate and asks for some help from a detective he knows, Gotou Kazutoshi, who then becomes involved in the case when Yakumo uncovers that the hauntings are actually the result of a serial killer. The killer fearing being discovered kidnaps Haruka. Yakumo figures out where Haruka is taken to with help from her deceased sister and comes just in time to save Haruka. However the culprit escapes and sets fire to the building. Yakumo and Haruka escape the fire, and the killer is arrested by Gotou.
2	"The Curse Of The White Fox"; Transliteration: "byakko no tatari" (Japanese: 白狐の祟り)	October 10, 2010	April 25, 2013
During the night, two constructors begin fixing a new building near a temple for their boss President Irie, when they see a ghost. The scene returns to Haruka coming to see Saitou to bring him her possessed friend Miki. Saitou tells the spirits on her body that the killer is dead, the spirits leave and Miki regains her conscience. After that they go on the bus together Saitou leaves first going back to the university and Haruka leaves for her part-time job. There Haruka serves President Irie and his friend Kunimatsu. She hears about the Fox curse that has been haunting the building/temple from Kunimatsu. After work she goes to the building and to her surprise meets Saitou's uncle and his home which is a temple. She continues to stay and also meets Irie. Irie was picking up a wooden block that had words written on it from his dead lover. There they hear a little girl laughing and the lights breaking which causes Saitou to save Haruka. Saitou was there to investigate the haunting and deduced they were man-made. Kunimatsu, who was in a shed near them, engineered the hauntings to stop Irie from moving the shrine. Irie tells Saitou and Haruka about his love and how he wants to meet her again. Saitou tells him that she had been waiting there for him all along. Suddenly the fox curse appears and turns out to be his lover. Together they meet and everything is solved.
3	"The Darkness Of The Tunnel"; Transliteration: "tonneru no yami" (Japanese: トンネルの闇)	October 17, 2010	May 9, 2013
Yakumo takes up a case regarding the death of a school boy and, Haruka tells him of an experience she had when a co-worker was driving her home through a tunnel. Yakumo begins to believe he can only see spirits but nothing more, and so he cannot help them all the time. Yakumo also considers the lives of people around him (especially Haruka's) that he is endangering.
4	"Connecting Spirits ~ Possession ~"; Transliteration: "tamashii o tsunagu mono ~ hyoui ~" (Japanese: 魂をつなぐもの～憑依～)	October 24, 2010	May 16, 2013
After stopping to help a man lying in the street, Hijikata Makoto (a reporter and daughter of the chief of police), is possessed by the man's spirit once he passes away. The next day Haruka is asked by a girl to investigate the death of a schoolgirl named Ayaka. While Yakumo is asked by Gotou to investigate the possession of Hijikata as a plea from the chief. While investigating the death of the schoolgirl Ayaka, Haruka saw the ghost of the schoolgirl and fell into the river while trying to communicate with the soul. She was saved by 2 policemen and taken to a clinic to recover. Coincidentally, Gotou and Yakumo were also at the clinic to ask Dr Kinoshita some questions about their investigation. Dr Kinoshita revealed that he was the doctor that delivered Yakumo and asked after his mother. Yakumo revealed his mother tried to kill him 10 years ago when he was a child. A policeman (possibly Gotou) managed to scare her off and she fled from the scene. She has been missing since that night. During the attack, Yakumo snapped the red pendant from his mother's neck. Yakumo pleaded with Dr Kinoshita to let him know his mother's reaction when she saw her newborn son with a red left eye. Dr Kinoshita revealed that she was scared out of her mind. This led Yakumo to believe he was an unwanted child. Haruka overheard the entire conversation about Yakumo's mother as she was standing outside the door. Yakumo is disgusted with himself and he attempts to throw his mother's pendant into a river. He is stopped by Haruka who talks him out of it and he asks her to hang onto it for him.
5	"Connecting Spirits ~ Rebirth ~"; Transliteration: "tamashii o tsunagu mono ~ sosei ~" (Japanese: 魂をつなぐもの～蘇生～)	October 31, 2010	May 23, 2013
Ayaka is the daughter of Dr Kinoshita who died during a typhoon and drown in the river. The doctor was also close to Dr Andou Takashi (the ghost possessing Hijikata Makoto). Gotou and Yakumo revealed that they connect Dr Kinoshita to Andou from a photo in Andou's belongings. There was also 2 keys in his belongings. One led to a locker with a bag full of money. Gotou and Yakumo managed to track the 2nd key to a storeroom near a dam. They found a missing girl Hashimoto Rumi along with belongings of 2 murdered young girls. The police believed that Dr Andou was the murderer of the 2 girls. Haruka was attacked by Dr Kinoshita's accomplice who has told him that Haruka would be a good vessel for his daughter's soul. Gotou and Yakumo arrived at the dam but was unable to stop Kinoshita from throwing Haruka into the river and tied down with a weight. With the help of his mother's pendant, Yakumo managed to rescue Haruka. Dr Kinoshita admitted to the murders of the 2 young girls. He has also killed Andou as he was blackmailing Kinoshita and threatened to go to the police. Dr Kinoshita revealed that a man with 2 red eyes advised him that killing girls about the same age as his daughter would allow her soul to possess their bodies, and Ayaka would return. Yakumo and Haruka told him that her daughter did possess the dead girl's body to console them and take away their fear and pain; each time experiencing the pain and torment of death. Satisfied that his murderer has been dealt with, Andou's spirit left the body of Hijikata. It was revealed that the man with 2 red eyes is Yakumo's father.
6	"Cheap Article"; Transliteration: "kakuyasu no bukken" (Japanese: 格安の物件)	November 7, 2010	May 30, 2013
Yakumo and Haruka investigate the haunting of an apartment rented cheaply by a university student, Date Shota. Through the realtor, they learnt that the previous tenant, Shiobara Kimiko had died of natural causes in the apartment and is now haunting it. Yakumo was able to communicate with her ghost and she requested for a letter (hidden behind the mirror in the room) to be burned. Haruku broke Kimiko's request not to read the content of the letter and saw a photo of Kimiko in it. Despite that, Kimiko was sufficiently pacified and wish Haruka well before her spirit departed.
7	"Connecting Thoughts ~ Trap ~"; Transliteration: "tsunagaru omoi ~ wana ~" (Japanese: つながる想い～罠～)	November 14, 2010	May 30, 2013
Detective Gotou enlisted the help of Yakumo to investigate a supposedly ghost video taken at Nanase Mansion, where 4 members of the Nanase family was murdered 15 years ago. The video was obtained by Hijikata Makoto and filmed by a scriptwriter Hoshin Yukiko. Yakumo went off and investigate on his own after watching the video. While interviewing Hoshin, Gotou noticed that she resembles the woman seen with Yakumo's father but was unsure of his observation. Gotou and Yuutarou investigated the Nanase Mansion where Gotou was attacked by Miyuki Nanase (the same woman with Yakumo's father). Miyuki was apparently kidnapped on the day of the Nanase family massacre but has remained missing since. Yakumo tracked down the place where the ghost video was filmed and was also attacked by Miyuki, who claimed to be bringing the darkness to him and wants to destroy him.
8	"Connecting Thoughts ~ Bonds ~"; Transliteration: "tsunagaru omoi ~ en ~" (Japanese: つながる想い～縁～)	November 21, 2010	June 6, 2013
Yakumo and Detective Gotou are still missing. Makoto and Yuutarou contacted Haruka and discussed with Yakumo's uncle, Isshin on finding Yakumo. Haruku figured out that the ghost video was not shot at the Nanase mansion and both Makoto and Yuutarou also verified that Hoshin Yukiko was a fake. Isshin revealed that the ghost in the video is Yakumo's mother, Azusa. He related the story of how Azusa was kidnapped and held captive when she was young. She eventually escaped two weeks later and was assisted by Haruka's mother, Keiko. They continued to keep in touch and Isshin had an unopened letter from Keiko to Azusa. The letter revealed that Azusa's fiancée is Shunsuke Takeda, who is a suspect in the Nanase Family Massacre. Meanwhile, Miyuki (the woman with Yakumo's father) was seen outside Haruka's apartment and is planning to capture her to torture Yakumo further. Shunsuke Takeda also appeared to protect Haruka and had lured to the police and managed to scare Miyuki away.
9	"Connecting Thoughts ~ Light ~"; Transliteration: "tsunagaru omoi ~ hikari ~" (Japanese: つながる想い～光～)	November 28, 2010	June 13, 2013
Ishii finally figured out the identity of Miyuki as the woman with Yakumo's father. After interviewing her tutor, Ishii and Hijikata find Detective Gotou in a secret room within the Nanase Mansion, with a little help from Takeda. After untying Detective Gotou he says that Takeda's spirit told him that Yakumo's father was going to kill Haruka in front of Yakumo. Takeda's spirit also told Haruka that Yakumo is in Nagano. She calls her mother and travels to Nagano, to the place where Yakumo's mother was raped. There she finds Yakumo tied to a chair with wounds on his chest. Haruka thinking that Yakumo was dead and starts crying and yells "Don't give up!". Yakumo was alive but weak from the drugs. They leave the house together, but Miyuki appear and tried to kill Haruka. Detective Gotou and arrive on the scene. It was revealed that that woman is actually Nanase Miyuki, the real culprit in the Nanase Quadruple Murder. Yakumo's mother's spirit appears and helps them by detaining Nanase. Gotou revealed that Takeda has told him the truth at the Nanase Mansion about Yakumo's mother. Takeda had proposed to Azusa but after he became a suspect in the Nanase Family Massacre, the shock was too big for her. Furthermore, she was tormented and manipulated by her rapist (Yakumo's father) that Yakumo will kill more people than Takeda because of his red eyes. He then murdered Takeda to keep his quiet. Despair and fear finally drove Azusa to try and kill Yakumo. Yakumo finally realizing his mother truly loved him tells his father that he has now lost. However, he and Nanase are able to escape the area. They discovered the bodies of Azusa and Takeda and their spirit departed peacefully. It is also said by Yakumo, that he only recently realized, that his mother and Takeda was in love. When Haruka asks him why, he doesn't answer. Yakumo and Haruka seems to have feelings for each other.
10	"End of Despair ~ Notice ~"; Transliteration: "shitsui no hate ni ~ kokuchi ~" (Japanese: 失意の果てに～告知～)	December 5, 2010	June 20, 2013
Haruka and Yakumo accompany Haruka's mother to the train station. She tells them that she will send them something, but they did not hear what as the train door was already closing as she was telling them. Hijikata Makoto is then shown talking to a doctor at a hospital. The doctor tells her of a ghost appearing and asking patients when they will die. Hijikata promises to relay this case to and expert she knows (Yakumo) and begins to leave running into Saitou Isshin and Nao. Isshin tells her that he is there to consult a doctor because of frequent headaches. While he is there he meets a young girl in a wheelchair and they discuss what happens after death. After comforting her he asks her to become friends with Nao. Meanwhile, the hunt for the culprit of the murder case of Quadruple Nanase, Miyuki Nanase, ends with her being captured by the police. While in jail she believes that Yakumo's father will come and give her freedom, once again (as he did when she was young). The doctor reveals to Isshin that he only has about one year left to live. Later that day Yakumo goes to the temple to borrow the car from his uncle to investigate the ghost in the hospital. Isshin invites them to some tea before they leave and gives them a package from Haruka's mother. The package is revealed to be an album she compiled of pictures sent to her by Yakumo's mother of Yakumo as a child. A little later Isshin tells Yakumo privately what the doctor had said. In the meantime Miyuki Nanase reveals to Gotou and his superior that Yakumo's father plans to kill Isshin.
11	"End of Despair ~ Assassin's Dagger ~"; Transliteration: "shitsui no hate ni ~~" (Japanese: 失意の果てに～～)	December 12, 2010	June 27, 2013
Gotou and Ishii rushed to the shrine to protect Isshin; but he knocked Gotou out before confronting Yakumo's father on his own. He was subsequently stabbed, apparently by Yakumo's father. Meanwhile, Haruka and Yakumo proceeded to the hospital to investigate the ghost of the girl. They encountered her apologizing to the patient she has previously confronted. Haruka and Yakumo eventually learnt of Isshin's injuries. Due to the extensive loss of blood, he was declared brain dead by the doctor. Gotou took Nao back to his house to be looked after by his wife. Ishii has deduced and forensic evidence suggest that Yakumo's father may be a spirit but one who is able to interact with the physical world. He possessed Miyuki so that she could be sent to the hospital.
12	"Beyond Despair ~ Hatred ~"; Transliteration: "shitsui no hate ni ~ zouo ~" (Japanese: 失意の果てに～憎悪～)	December 19, 2010	July 4, 2013
Haruka and Yakumo saw the ghost of the little girl over Isshin and followed it to the room of Mamiya Yoshiko, the little girl in the wheelchair that Isshin met in the hospital. Yakumo found out that Yoshiko is the daughter of the Prof Sakakibara, the attending doctor on the night that Isshin was attacked. He found further proof that Prof Sakakibara was the actual attacker of his uncle (from the damaged mirror that he side swiped when he was rushing back to the temple). His motivation for attacking Isshin was so that his organ could be harvested (Isshin is a registered organ donor) and used to save his daughter. Yakumo managed to corner Sakaibara on the hospital heli-pad. Gotou, Ishii, Haruka, Nao and Makoto arrives shortly after. Meanwhile, Miyuki has managed to escape and had also injured two policemen and got away with their gun. After Yakumo subdue Prof Sakaibara, his father appeared and Yakumo confirmed that his father is a spirit of the dead. Suddenly, Miyuki appeared and fire a shot.
13	"Beyond Despair ~ Eternity ~"; Transliteration: "shitsui no hate ni ~ kuon ~" (Japanese: 失意の果てに～久遠～)	December 26, 2010	July 11, 2013
Miyuki shot Gotou in the stomach to generate hatred within Yakumo so that his father's spirit can attempt a possession. Miyuki explained that the purpose of luring Yakumo to embrace the darkness is to ensure that his state of mind is practically the same as his father, allowing his father and his soul to merge and for his father to take over his body. Yakumo appeared to be possessed by his father as both his eyes is now red; but he has tricked Miyuki by using his uncle's red contact lens. He managed to disarm Miyuki but she managed to escape. Yakumo's father vow to continue to pursue his objectives. Yakumo gave his consent to sign the organ release form to save Sakaibara's daughter; but on the condition that Sakibara turned himself in to the police. Meanwhile, Miyuki drove a car into the lake and her body was never found. Gotou and his wife decides to adopt Nao as their daughter. After the funeral of his uncle, Yakumo discovered his uncle's spirit still lurking around and managed to convince his uncle to leave by telling him that both Nao and he will be fine and that they have a family. It was also never said if Yakumo and Haruka got together in the future. Instead everything went back to normal
