= List of The Legend of the Legendary Heroes episodes =

The Legend of the Legendary Heroes is an anime television series adapted from the light novels of the same title by Takaya Kagami and Saori Toyota. Produced by Zexcs and directed by Itsuro Kawasaki, the series was broadcast from July 10, 2010, to December 16, 2010, on TV Tokyo for 24 episodes. The series follows the adventures of Ryner Lute, a student of the Roland Empire Royal Magician's Academy who sets out on a journey to search for the relics of a "Legendary Hero", accompanied by the local swordswoman Ferris Eris. However, the two soon discover that a deadly curse is spreading throughout the continent.

The first DVD and Blu-ray compilation was released in Japan on October 22, 2010. In 2010, Funimation licensed the series for an English simulcast release.

Four pieces of theme music were used: two opening themes and two ending themes. For the first 12 episodes, the opening theme is titled "Lament: Joy Soon" (LAMENT～やがて喜びを～"LAMENT ~Yagate Yorokobi wo~") performed by Aira Yuhki, and the ending theme, "Truth Of My Destiny", is performed by Ceui. The second opening and ending themes, used for the remainder of the series are "Last Inferno" performed by Ceui and Light's Firmento (光のフィルメント, Hikari no Firumento) performed by Ayahi Takagaki, respectively.

== Episodes list ==
No.	Title	Directed by	Written by	Original release date	First English release date
1	"The Napping Kingdom's Ambitions" (Japanese: 昼寝王国の野望)	Itsuro Kawasaki; Yoshiyuki Takayanagi	Kiyoko Yoshimura	July 1, 2010	July 2, 2010
Ryner Lute and Ferris Eris, searching for the legendary hero relics together, are ambushed by magic knights from another country. Managing to fend off the knights, they arrive at Nelpha, entering its ruins inside the forest, filled with booby traps. Milk Callaud, who have been following the two, mistakes Ryner to be under a spell cast by Ferris, knowing nothing of their mission. A hero relic in the form of a boulder begins to chase Ryner and Ferris outside, attacking them with red laser beams, but with the use of a rare gem, the boulder is only temporarily destroyed by its powerful burst of light.
2	"The Hero and the Sleepy Man" (Japanese: 英雄と寝ぼけ男)	Toshinori Watabe	Itsuro Kawasaki	July 8, 2010	July 9, 2010
During his time in military school, Ryner seems to be a waste of space during the magic training session. Sion Astal requests Kiefer Knolles to join his combat squad due to her exceptional skills. He then recommends Ryner to join as well, already knowing his role as the bearer of the Alpha Stigma. However, Sion is also troubled with the duty of stopping assassination attempts and uncovering conspiracies connected to Estabul. After Sion has observed firsthand Ferris's skills in combat against his enemies, he hires her to search for the one responsible for these happenings. As Sion leads his team to Estabul, they are unaware that fifty magic knights of Estabul are awaiting their arrival.
3	"Alpha Stigma" (Japanese: 複写眼(アルファ・スティグマ))	Kōta Okuno	Itsuro Kawasaki	July 15, 2010	July 16, 2010
Kiefer confesses her love for Ryner, but she runs away when he does not take her seriously. The magic knights ambush the school troop when they least expect it. This leads Ryner to use the tabooed power of the Alpha Stigma to defeat the magic knights when most of his friends are seen dead, almost to the point of going berserk and losing control. Ryner is nearly tortured to death as punishment, and he allows to be confined in exchange for Kiefer to be released, also rejecting Sion's offer of escaping from prison.
4	"Ryner Report" (Japanese: ライナ・レポート)	Yoshiyuki Takayanagi	Kiyoko Yoshimura	July 22, 2010	July 23, 2010
Lucile Eris, brother of Ferris, summons Sion to question his suitability as king, by which a wrong answer could be fatal to his life. Ryner bides his time in prison studiously for two years reading a collection of records. Though Ryner is sentenced to his execution in the town under the escort of Ferris, the two test their strength in battle. It turns out that the new king, which so happens to be Sion, is impressed by Ryner's research during his imprisonment, and thereby assigns Ryner and Ferris to seek the hero relics.
5	"A World That Has Begun to Awaken" (Japanese: 目覚め始めた世界)	Hisaya Takabayashi	Kiyoko Yoshimura	July 29, 2010	July 30, 2010
Having traveled to Nelpha, Ryner and Ferris run into Toale Nelphi while researching the hero relics in the town library. Meanwhile, dissent in Roland escalates to the assassination of Fiole Folkal, a commoner who was made secretary to the king, reported during a royal banquet. While Ryner and Ferris stays at Toale's house for dinner, Ryner meets Iris Eris, sister of Ferris, who deems herself to be the only source of contact to Sion. Soon Miran Froaude arrives, offering to aid Sion for whatever means necessary, even to such desperate measures.
6	"Those Lurking in the Darkness" (Japanese: 暗がりに潜む者)	Shizuo Higa	Yuka Yamada	August 5, 2010	August 6, 2010
Sion takes Froaude as his new assistant to Nelpha, where another assassination might occur at the next royal banquet. Ryner and Ferris are asked to be on a lookout outside the manor. Froaude mistakes the two as potential threats, clashing with them using his sorcery against their magic, leaving Ferris wounded. The ring that Froaude wears was given to him through inheritance, allowing him the ability to perform shadow magic. Froaude leaves after saying he will let Toale live for the time being. Ryner and Ferris leave Toale's house the next morning to continue their search for the hero relics.
7	"Don't Let Go of That Hand" (Japanese: その手を離さない)	Yūji Yamaguchi	Keiichirō Ōchi	August 12, 2010	August 13, 2010
At the Nelpha fortress, Ryner and Ferris find nothing but a box of tax evasion papers. Both Sui Orla and Kuu Orla first believed that the box contained treasure, but they are dismayed as well. Milk tries to pursue Ryner away from Ferris inside a forest, but she is easily defeated and tied up. Ryner finds a hero relic in the form of a blade buried underground, using it to prevent the Nelpha army from capturing Milk. However, in the midst of confusion, the blade transforms into a dragon and chases the army away across the countryside. When Milk nearly gives up the hope of carrying out her duty, Luke Stokkart reminds her of the reason why she became the leader of her taboo hunter squad.
8	"The Estabul Revolt" (Japanese: エスタブール反乱)	Tatsuya Oka	Toshizō Nemoto	August 19, 2010	August 20, 2010
Froaude provokes mutiny between Roland and Estabul, which is not what Sion had in mind. Noa Ehn, facing the cruel reality of a life of politics, wishes for peace between the two kingdoms. Claugh Klom leads his army to defeat the opponents, soon reaching toward the main stronghold. However, Froaude issues out a surprise attack inside the fortress, going against the initial order. Noa, realizing that Froaude is the one behind this rebellion, is comforted when Claugh protects her from being attacked.
9	"Rule Fragment" (Japanese: 忘却欠片(ルール・フラグメ))	Kazunobu Shimizu	Ayuna Fujisaki	August 26, 2010	August 27, 2010
Iris reports that Ryner and Ferris should apprehend the dragon that was recently released, but they do not know that Sion recommended them not to pass through the forest. The two run into the devious duo Sui and Kuu, who have possession of the blade hero relic that was left behind. During a heated confrontation, Sui triggers the deadly Alpha Stigma from within Ryner, however Sui has underestimated the limit of this legendary power.
10	"Twilight" (Japanese: 夕暮れ)	Toshinori Watabe	Kiyoko Yoshimura	September 2, 2010	September 3, 2010
Witness to Ryner's monstrous transformation, Ferris is forced to challenge the Alpha Stigma's devastating power, managing to calm him down by bringing him back to his senses. Froaude urges the king to make his next move to address potential attacks on the kingdom. Though Claugh is assigned to take care of Noa, she is violated by a group of unknown assailants from right under his nose, yet his return makes a great impression on them despite being wounded. On the way to Runa, Ryner and Ferris encounter a young girl named Kuku, who pleads for them to rescue her childhood friend Arua rumored to be a bearer of the Alpha Stigma, soon facing a horrible fate.
11	"Devil's Child"; Transliteration: "Akuma no ko" (Japanese: 悪魔の子)	Shunji Yoshida	Keiichirō Ōchi	September 9, 2010	September 10, 2010
Sion promotes several of his supporting nobles to bolster loyalty among his allies. Despite Milk failing to carry out her mission, Rahel Miller allows her to retain her position as captain. The magic knights of Runa tries to activate the Alpha Stigma within Arua by torturing his parents. Ryner, irritated by this, launches an attack on the group, while Ferris defends him. Arua awakens the Alpha Stigma after seeing his mother and father dead, but Ryner is able to put him to sleep not before long. Ryner questions why he was born with such a cursed ability.
12	"The Great Housecleaning Banquet" (Japanese: 大掃除の宴)	Hisaya Takabayashi	Toshizō Nemoto	September 16, 2010	September 17, 2010
Treachery against Roland continues to breed. Affluent and coveted by many nobles, Froaude holds a party at his home to lure in those conspiring against Sion. He kills all the dining guests to ensure that no one stands in the way of the king. Nonetheless, Froaude is then faced against Lir Orla, who performs lightning magic using the ring he wears. Claugh reluctantly save Froaude from the blue flames emitted from the crystal that Lir unleashes. Sui and Kuu force Runa to join forces with Gastark. Ryner and Ferris, after taking out a group of magic knights, trek back to Regit with Arua in tow.
13	"The Hero King of the North" (Japanese: 北の勇者王)	Yūji Yamaguchi	Ayuna Fujisaki	September 23, 2010	September 24, 2010
The magic knights of Roland killed Kiefer's older sister and captured Kiefer's younger sister four years ago, which then urged her to become a military double agent. After Kiefer saves two defenseless children in the midst of war against Stohl, Riphal Edia uses aggressive tactics of invasion by using a long sword hero relic in exchange for his left eye, claiming that he is waging wars to ultimately end the fighting against Gastark. Ryner and Ferris are tracked down by Sui and Kuu, inciting another battle for having interest in retrieving Arua for his unique ability. Froaude is aware that Runa is now in alliance with Gastark.
14	"A World Where No One and Nothing Is Lost" (Japanese: 誰も、なにも失わない世界)	Tatsuya Oka	Yuka Yamada	September 30, 2010	October 1, 2010
Ryner and Ferris, taking Arua with them, head to a manor, where Sui and Kuu have taken Kuku hostage. Ryner is against the idea of using the Alpha Stigma as for the means of war. Just when Kuku is about to face death, Froaude unexpectedly appears and intervenes, but Ryner allows Sui and Kuu to escape. Froaude leaves with saying that the Alpha Stigma may be a blessing instead of a curse. Sion must change the order of his kingdom to ensure peace among nations.
15	"Kill the King" (Japanese: きる・ざ・きんぐ)	Ikehata Hiroshi	Kiyoko Yoshimura	October 7, 2010	October 8, 2010
Ryner and Ferris somehow get lost at sea, washing up on a coast of Roland, briefly running into Luke and Milk. Ryner and Ferris set out in an attempt to assassinate the king who caused all their troubles, but to no avail. The next morning, Sion, after seeing a book fall from over the bedroom door, finds Ryner sleeping in his bed. Though Ryner calls Sion arrogant, he forgives Sion for putting him through so much agony.
15.5	"Iris Report" (Japanese: いりす・れぽ～と)	Itsuro Kawasaki	Itsuro Kawasaki	October 14, 2010	October 15, 2010
Iris examines the adventures her fearless older sister Ferris and the indomitable Ryner have endured since Sion assigned them to find the legendary hero relics.
16	"The Goddess Who Doesn`t Smile" (Japanese: 微笑まない女神)	Seo Hye-jin	Keiichirō Ōchi	October 21, 2010	October 22, 2010
In a flashback we see the Ferris of four years ago, after years of abuse by her parents in the form of harsh training, be found to be unworthy of further training. Her only further use to the family name is as the bearer a child, to be fathered by her own father. Lucile protects Ferris by murdering their parents. Sion asks Ryner to accompany him to Estabul, but Ryner declines the offer. While visiting Arua and Kuku at the Eris residence, he senses a bad vibe coming from the family dojo. There Ryner, showing concern for Ferris, chances upon Lucile, who initiates a mild confrontation. Lucile warns Ryner not to mingle with Ferris, lest he meet his end. Milk later delivers Ryner a letter of invitation to her birthday party being celebrated the following day. Unbeknownst to her, Luke Stokkart switched the invitation for a copy of a writ from Sion to the Pursuit Squadron ordering them to kill Ryner if he goes out of control or is found to act against Roland.
17	"Iino Doue (Annihilation Eye)" (Japanese: 殲滅眼(イーノ・ドゥーエ))	Jirō Fujimoto	Toshizō Nemoto	October 28, 2010	October 29, 2010
Both Ryner and Milk are reported missing, which raises speculations. Sion sends a task force led by Claugh to pursue a supposed Alpha Stigma bearer in Estabul. Meanwhile, Kiefer, beginning her research in Gasark about the Iino Doue, is interrupted by Riphal, who offers to have tea with her. Tiir Rumibul, who is easily able to consume flesh and absorb magic, cuts off Claugh's arm and slaughter much of the task force. Claugh is taken away from the battleground to get treatment for his wounds. Luke, learning that Froaude has captured Milk, halts him from attacking using thread magic.
18	"Cursed Eyes" (Japanese: 呪われた瞳)	Erkin Kawabata	Yuka Yamada	November 4, 2010	November 5, 2010
Ferris finds out from Eslina Folkal that Ryner has been spotted somewhere in Estabul. She locates him at an inn and wrecks the place out of anger, questioning of what Lucile said to him that caused him to storm out of town. Tiir, soon appears and subdues both of them, but that shortly is interrupted when Sion leads the army to attack Tiir with arrows. When Ryner and Ferris safely exit the inn, Sion stops the attack. Tiir offers Ryner an escape from a life of struggle, much to Ferris's dismay and Sion's understanding.
19	"The Directionless Ingrate" (Japanese: 行方知れずの恩知らず)	Toshinori Watabe	Ayuna Fujisaki	November 11, 2010	November 12, 2010
Both Ferris and Sion contemplate their relationships with Ryner. After Riphal surprisingly asks Kiefer for her hand in marriage, Kuu arrives with a wounded Sui, who mentions the name of Ryner, troubling Kiefer. Calne Kaiwal gives Claugh a written synopsis of Ryner, explaining how and why he had been sent to train in a military academy regimen. Tiir takes Ryner to a refuge for children who possess the Iino Doue. Tiir swears vengeance against the heartless humans who murder their kind. Ryner is reminded that although he appears to be monstrous, he is in truth a kindhearted person. However, he still ponders the reasons why he and other like him are born. Ryner later encounters Luke, who was sent to assassinate him.
20	"A Mind Not Filled With Despair" (Japanese: 絶望に埋め尽くされない心)	Masakazu Yamazaki	Kiyoko Yoshimura	November 18, 2010	November 19, 2010
As Ryner fights for his life against Luke near the hideout, Ferris suddenly intervenes. Lir, who has been tailing Tiir, takes the opportunity to strike at the refugees sleeping in the hideout. A furious Ryner attacks Lir at full force when one of the refugees is killed, but Ferris again steps in. Lir tries to force Ryner to activate the Alpha Stigma using a crystallized eye, but Ryner is able to ward off the overwhelming temptation. Lir leaves when Luke joins forces with Ryner while Tiir takes the refugees to safety. Once Lir retreats, Luke also leaves. Ryner agrees to return to Roland with Ferris, but only under the condition that she is the one who takes his life if he were to lose control of the Alpha Stigma.
21	"Roland's Darkness" (Japanese: ローランドの闇)	Yūji Yamaguchi	Toshizō Nemoto	November 25, 2010	November 26, 2010
After Riphal finds out that she is a spy, he chains Kiefer in an underground dungeon. Ryner and Ferris return to Roland, only to be locked in Sion's office to help file many stacks of paperwork. Milk finally awakens from Froaude's spell, only to find that her parents, very dear to her, had been murdered. Ryner is very concerned that Sion is overworking himself. Froaude later confronts Sion, wondering why Ryner is still alive. Sion retaliates by unleashing his full power.
22	"The Beast Called Alpha" (Japanese: αという名の獣)	Tatsuya Oka	Keiichirō Ōchi	December 2, 2010	December 3, 2010
Lieral Lieutolu, claiming to be Ryner's father, sedates Ryner in the garden, but he evades with the body when Lucile appears. Ferris, finding Lieral, fails to save Ryner from this mysterious duke. Trapped in a bizarre inner world, Ryner faces the Alpha, but Iluna Lieutolu, claiming to be his mother, temporarily dissolves it through emergence, telling him to pass through a large door, all before she is devoured by the Alpha. He suddenly yet unexpectedly wakes up in a bed with his longtime companion. Lucile brings Sion into a room where he is to confront his alter ego. Riphal, releasing Kiefer from her cell, orders her to bring Ryner to him, fearing that Sion has already made plans to kill Ryner.
23	"The Last Day" (Japanese: 最後の日)	Itsuro Kawasaki; Yoshiyuki Takayanagi	Kiyoko Yoshimura	December 9, 2010	December 10, 2010
Ryner works his fingers to the bone for Sion's birthday celebration. When he later gets the chance to ditch the office, he runs into Milk and remembers that she gave him an invitation for her party days ago. Claugh has an idea to prepare fireworks for the upcoming festival, despite it could take six months to make it happen. When the party begins at night, fireworks burst into the sky, as even Milk has a birthday of her own. As the party dies down, Ryner and Sion share a moment of reflection in their views of changing the world, but the nostalgia turns into fiery conflict.
24	"A Distant Day's Promise" (Japanese: 遠い日の約束)	Itsuro Kawasaki; Yoshiyuki Takayanagi	Kiyoko Yoshimura	December 16, 2010	December 17, 2010
Sion is consumed by the spirit of the mad hero, as he nearly takes Ryner's life. Iluna comes out of Ryner, who has the spirit of the lonely demon within him, to prevent Sion from killing Ryner out of selfish ambition, but Lucile puts Ryner to sleep after Iluna disappears. Sion hesitates to kill Ryner when confronting the mad hero. When Ryner then finds himself in prison, Ferris helps him narrowly escape peril. Ryner vows to save his friend from the turmoil he endures on the twisted path to achieve his dream.
