= Bino and Fino =

Nigerian children's television series

- Title card
- Genre: Education
- Created by: Adamu Waziri
- Country of origin: Nigeria
- Original languages: English; Twi; Yoruba; Dutch
- No. of episodes: 24

Production
- Running time: 11 minutes

Original release
- Release: October 2010

Bino and Fino is an educational preschool children's cartoon created by Nigerian animator Adamu Waziri. It features a brother and sister, Bino and Fino. With the magical Zeena the Butterfly, they learn about African history and culture. Since 2010 it has been broadcast in over 15 countries, in numerous languages including English, Twi, Yoruba, German, Dutch, Portuguese, Hausa, Igbo, French and Swahili.

It has been compared to Charlie and Lola and Dora the Explorer.
