= List of Shiki episodes =

Cover of the first Japanese DVD compilation featuring Natsuno Yuuki.

The anime series Shiki is an adaptation of the manga series drawn by Ryu Fujisaki, which is itself an adaptation of a novel of the same name by Fuyumi Ono. The story is about a small town in rural Japan named Sotoba, where a series of bizarre deaths occur. The series of deaths coincide with the arrival of the Kirishiki family, who has just moved into a castle built on the outskirts of town. Toshio Ozaki, director of the only hospital in Sotoba, begins to investigate and discovers there are supernatural presences at work, namely vampires, who are called shiki, translated in English as "corpse demon".

The series premiered on Fuji TV, Kansai TV, Tōkai TV and their affiliated stations on July 8, 2010. Funimation has acquired the license to simulcast the series one hour after its initial broadcast in Japan with English subtitles. The first of the DVDs and Blu-ray of the anime were released on October 27, 2010, by Aniplex.

Each episode title is a homophone pronunciation for the Japanese numerals using On'yomi, with each phrase mostly related to death or the corruption of the physical body, both common themes in the series. The series has four pieces of theme music. The first opening theme "Kuchizuke" (くちづけ, Kiss) is a song by Buck-Tick, while the first ending theme "Walk no Yakusoku" (walkの約束, Promise of the Walk) is a song by nangi. The second opening theme is "Calendula Requiem" by kanon×kanon while the second ending theme is "Gekka Reijin" by Buck-Tick.

== Episode listing ==
No.	Title	Original release date
1	"The Shed Blood/First Blood"; Transliteration: "Dai ichi wa" (Japanese: 第遺血話)	July 8, 2010
During a hot summer in a quiet town named Sotoba, bizarre deaths of the elderly in an isolated part of town surprises hospital dean Toshio Ozaki and his best friend, Seishin Muroi, a local priest who discovered the bodies. While the investigation is underway, a moving company arrives in the dead of night with the Kirishiki family, who will be occupying a long abandoned castle in Sotoba. Megumi Shimizu, a high school girl who is classmates with another village girl Kaori Tanaka, constantly fails to befriend Natsuno Yuuki, a boy who hates living in Sotoba and wishes for city life. She has a bad habit of stalking Natsuno around his house at night, though he is aware of her activities. One day, Megumi heads up the hill to the castle and meets the Kirishiki family, then disappears afterwards. Upon learning of her disappearance, most of the townspeople head out to look for Megumi, only to discover her lying catatonic in the woods. Toshio examines Megumi and only finds her to be suffering a case of anemia from insect bites, but nothing serious. However, Megumi passes away a few days later, to the shock of her family and friends.
2	"Decadent/Second Decay"; Transliteration: "Dai futa (ni) wa" (Japanese: 第腐堕話)	July 16, 2010
Toshio is shocked that Megumi died from anemia, and requests her parents to do an autopsy on her, but her father refuses. While heading to Megumi's funeral, Natsuno meets Ritsuko Kunihiro, a nurse working at Toshio's hospital. After paying his respects, Kaori approaches Natsuno and attempts to give Megumi's greeting card present to him, but he declines, stating that he wasn't close to Megumi anyway. Meanwhile, Toshio and his staff conclude that Megumi died from an uncommon type of anemia but the cause of death remains unknown. More deaths start to get the attention of Toshio, with the latest victim refusing to see the doctor. Toshio and Seishin meet up with the town councilman Ishida, who reveals that ten people died from mysterious causes between Sotoba and Mizobe, a neighbouring village, in an unusually short period of time. Toshio has reason to believe an epidemic is spreading, so he, Seishin and Ishida do their best to investigate without panicking the populace. Toshio swears to find out the cause of this and save his village. Natsuno suddenly feels uncomfortable and closes up his window, like he always did to prevent the late Megumi peeking on him. However, it still brings no comfort as he feels a pair of eyes watching him from outside.
3	"Wretched/Third Tragedy"; Transliteration: "Dai san wa" (Japanese: 第惨話)	July 22, 2010
Seishin works on a novel called Shiki, which describes the undead. Natsuno goes to school and meets his best friend, Mutou Toru, along with Ritsuko. He hitches a ride with them to Mizobe, where they later meet up with a classmate, Masao Murasako, who intensely dislikes Natsuno. Masao has an estranged relationship with his family. Natsuno remembers how he did not want anything to do with the villagers since he moved here, until he met Toru. Meanwhile, Toshio still cannot find a source to the anemia-afflicted victims. His childhood friend, Mikiyasu Yasumori, brings his wife Nao, who is worsening from anemia. Toshio questions Mikiyasu if his workers or clients have been behaving strangely, and Mikiyasu tells him that his family met the Kirishiki couple a few nights ago. Seishin meets Kirishiki Sunako, who claims to be a fan of his essays. She hints at knowing his attempted suicide in the past. Nao passes away the next day from her illness. Masao arrives at Toru's house to announce her death and discovers Natsuno staying over. He almost gets into a fight with Natsuno before Toru breaks them up. Toru goes outside to get a soft drink and meets Tatsumi, who is the Kirishiki's steward. He ominously tells Toru that he will be meeting him again very soon.
4	"Fourth Death"; Transliteration: "Dai shi (yon) wa" (Japanese: 第死話)	July 29, 2010
Natsuno goes to bed each night wary of a presence peering at him through his windows. Ritsuko learns from a villager that the local policeman Takami died, with his family suddenly moving away without saying their goodbyes. He is replaced by another officer named Sasaki. Ritsuko realizes that another family also moved away when one of their kin died, and coincidentally, they employed the same mover company. Toshio is called to perform resuscitation on Mikiyasu's son, Susumu. He notices that Mikiyasu is also suffering from early symptoms of the illness. Toshio tells Seishin over the phone that Susumu is indeed suffering from anemia just like the other victims. Unfortunately, both father and son's condition is too late to be saved. Seishin wanders into the forest and encounters Sunako going out for a walk. Sunako tells him that she suffers from a disease that makes it too dangerous for her to be exposed in sunlight. Toshio gathers the hospital staff and announces that nineteen have died since September 10th, with Mikiyasu being the latest victim. They discuss the possible causes and plan to put up a report for the Public Health Department. Natsuno gets a lack of sleep from seeing visions of Megumi and requests to stay at Toru's place. At night, Natsuno senses Megumi and Tatsumi's presence and realizes it's not a nightmare. Megumi is jealous of Toru's presence and is about to bite down on him, with Natsuno unable to move.
5	"Fifth Deceit"; Transliteration: "Dai itsu (go) wa" (Japanese: 第偽話)	August 5, 2010
Natsuno wakes up in the morning but discovers Toru is seemingly unharmed. Seishin goes to interview family and friends of the deceased and learns that a number of them quit their jobs right before they died. He attempts to contact the local librarian but is told he has resigned as well. Natsuno learns that Toru has not come to school since the day he last saw him. He goes to his home and is shocked to see Toru pronounced dead by Toshio. He realizes that his nightmare is real and tears up Megumi's postcard when he receives it. Masao gets into a quarrel with his family over his nephew Hiromi, who is sick. He goes to Toru's funeral and finds Natsuno paying his last respects to Toru. Later, he tries to provoke Natsuno to a fight, but is stopped and driven away by Toru's siblings. Masao goes home and finds a man in white entering his house's courtyard, but when he looks around, he's gone. As Masao enters his house he is attacked by the man in white, who is revealed to be the librarian and a vampire.
6	"Sixth Skull"; Transliteration: "Dai roku wa" (Japanese: 第髏苦話)	August 12, 2010
The revived Megumi picks up the torn pieces of her postcard to Natsuno and is sad and angered at Natsuno's treatment of her. Natsuno confirms that Megumi came to his house and swears that he won't die so easily. Meanwhile, Toshio confirms Hiromi's death while Masao, who has been attacked earlier, is immobilized and unable to call for help. Toshio discovers that the insect bites are a likely vector for infection. He loses his patience when his latest patient's wife makes a diagnosis and treatment despite the seriousness of cyanosis. When Seishin informs Toshio about the bizarre goings-on between the deceased victims, Toshio scolds his friend for checking out something not related to the illness. At night, Sunako comes to visit Seishin and the monk warns her about the dangerous disease spreading in the village, but she doesn't seem at all worried. On September 20th, Masao dies. Natsuno rents a vampire horror movie to watch with Toru's brother and is told about the legend of the "risen". Natsuno discovers that Seishin has been borrowing books on the same subject and visits his temple, but is told by Miwako, Seishin's mother, that her son is out on business. Part-timers working at Toshio's clinic began quitting in fear of catching the disease. Natsuno visits Toshio next, asking him if he is sure of Megumi's death. Toshio laughs it off when Natsuno thinks that Megumi may have revived, and jokes that anyone who did would be a vampire or zombie, seemingly coming to the realization that it might just be the case. When he asks Natsuno how he came up with the thought, the boy leaves. Kaori and her brother Akira sneak into the Kanemasa castle based on Akira's sightings of an already deceased villager heading inside. However, they are unaware of Tatsumi observing them from behind.
7	"Seventh Killing Spirit"; Transliteration: "Dai shichi wa" (Japanese: 第弑魑話)	August 19, 2010
Kaori and Akira are discovered by Natsuno who tells them to leave the vicinity of the mansion. When Akira mentions seeing Yasuyuki, the lumber factory owner who died recently, alive and entering the mansion, Natsuno realizes that both he and the Tanaka siblings know there's something weird with the people at the mansion. Natsuno tells them of seeing Megumi as well. To be sure, they will dig up her grave to check, but their conversation is overheard by Tatsumi. Meanwhile, a revived Masao is trapped in his casket and remembers how he died: the librarian attacked him and drank his blood for several days before he expired, while unable to call for help. He is freed by Tatsumi, who informs him that he is now one of the okiagari, meaning "risen", which has all the aspects of a vampire. Tatsumi is revealed to be a special vampire who can stay outdoors during the day and not drink human blood. He forces and convinces Masao that it's okay to attack and feed on his fellow human villagers in order to survive. Mikiyasu's father sends in his wife to Toshio's clinic, who is now the next victim. Toshio instructs him to allow her to stay at his clinic, and promises to protect her. Later, Seishin informs him of Ishida, the councilman who is now missing as well as the records of deaths in the village. He is stunned when Toshio believes that vampires are the cause of the deaths. Toshio intends to capture the culprit using Setsuko, Mikiyasu's mother, as bait and wants Seishin to help him, but the priest tells him that he will think about it. The Tanaka siblings meet up with Natsuno and they ready themselves to dig up Megumi's grave.
8	"Eighth Night"; Transliteration: "Dai ya (hachi) wa" (Japanese: 第夜話)	August 26, 2010
Natsuno, Kaori and Akira dig up Megumi's coffin to find it empty, confirming their suspicions. Kaori is suddenly captured by someone but manages to repel him using the good-luck charm she gave to Megumi. Natsuno arrives and kills the man in self-defense. They realize that the man has no body heat prior to being "killed", meaning he's one of the vampires. They partially bury him in Megumi's grave, hoping the adults will take notice. In the morning, the three return to the forest and discover that the vampire had revived and covered the grave back up. Natsuno decides to finish off old lady Motohashi, who just died from the "illness", if she arises from her grave. Meanwhile, Seishin suspects Sunako is one of the risen, by her speech and her genetic illness. While Natsuno is still outside, a young girl, Shizuka Matsuo, wearing kindergarten uniform and using a Japanese-style puppet to talk, goes to his house and asks his parents to let her in and claims to know Natsuno. Natsuno's father suspects the girl though he reluctantly invites her in due to his wife's persuasions. However, the girl, whose eyes glow ominously, asks to wait in Natsuno's room.
9	"Ninth Coffin"; Transliteration: "Dai kyū wa" (Japanese: 第柩話)	September 2, 2010
Seishin accompanies Toshio in the clinic at night to spot for any vampires who may attack Setsuko. Toshio speculates to Seishin about how the vampires attack and drink the victim's blood, and how they may use a type of narcotic to prevent them from speaking out. After a fruitless night, Setsuko's condition seems to be stable. Toshio meets his mother and his wife, Kyoko, both of them noticing he's exhausted. The next night, Ritsuko goes to the clinic to give Toshio and Seishin some food while they stay overnight, but encounters the revived Nao. Toshio tells Seishin of his intent to dissect the vampire if they catch one, much to the monk's dismay. Their conversation is interrupted when Setsuko wakes up by herself and tells someone she's here. Toshio and Seishin open the window and witness Nao, who's a vampire staring at them. As Nao leaves, Toshio shouts at her that she will never enter his clinic without permission. In the morning, Setsuko gets better and remembers dreaming of Nao calling her. Meanwhile, Kyoko meets Tatsumi outside the clinic. At night, Toshio and Seishin watch over Setsuko again but this time the clinic's electricity goes out. While Seishin goes to switch on the generator, Setsuko is compelled by Nao to leave and meet her. Toshio tries to stop her but is knocked down by Tatsumi, who introduces himself. Seishin sees a whole bunch of vampires outside, but unable to attack him. As vampires can only be invited, Tatsumi grabs Setsuko, telling Toshio that they have been ordered not to harm him yet. Setsuko is sucked of all blood by the waiting Nao and the other vampires in a feeding frenzy. Toshio grieves for Setsuko while blaming himself for being unable to save her. As the vampires leave, they notice Megumi is not with them. Tatsumi replies that he knows where she went.
10	"Tenth Mourning"; Transliteration: "Dai tō (jū) wa" (Japanese: 第悼話)	September 9, 2010
A flashback shows Tatsumi, on orders from the Kirishiki family, to settle the matter with Toshio and attack his clinic. However, Shisuka Matsuo is also one of the vampires who was ordered to attack as well, and so was not present when Natsuno came home. Megumi protests to Tatsumi that Natsuno is being targeted but he tells her they have to get rid of Natsuno as he knows their existence as well. Megumi wishes to kill and turn Natsuno herself but Tatsumi threatens to purge her if she disobeys orders. Natsuno's father discovers his son has put up talismans and holy objects in his room, and throws them out the following day. Natsuno warns Akira and Kaori not to invite anyone into their house as they may be vampires. On October 4th midnight, after Setsuko is killed, someone comes up to Natsuno's room window. Natsuno investigates and discovers the vampire sent to attack him is Toru. Ashamed, Toru runs off. Megumi encounters Toru and upon hearing his failed attempt, goes to kill Natsuno herself. Natsuno rushes out of his house to look for Toru. However, he encounters Tatsumi, who introduces himself. Tatsumi tells Natsuno that he's a threat just like Toshio and will be eliminated for the safety of their existence. Natsuno tries to run but Tatsumi has him cornered along with Megumi, who arrives. Before they can attack him, Toru appears behind Natsuno and bites him, after which the boy collapses.
11	"Eleventh Slaughter"; Transliteration: "Dai tō to hito (jūichi) wa" (Japanese: 第悼と悲屠話)	September 16, 2010
While Sotoba's villagers are debating the cause of the frequent deaths, the village shaman accuses the residents of Kanemasa mansion of being okiagari. No one around the village including her daughter believes her when she tells them their loved ones were killed by okiagari. Toshio is asked by people if the deaths are being caused by an epidemic, but he only tells them they should cremate any family members that die. Toshio and Seishin argue over the ethics of staking corpses before they become okiagari. Seishin discovers Sunako's secret. Toshio is confronted by the shaman and several villagers wanting the truth and he denies anything to do with okiagari, but when they won't leave he agrees he'll check the pulse of the father at Kanemasa mansion if he agrees to it. At the mansion, Seishirou Kirishiki – Sunako's father – explains why his wife and daughter can't go outside during the daytime. Toshio checks Seishirou's pulse; Mr. Kirishiki has a normal pulse, body temperature, and respiration. That night, the shaman is tricked into rescuing a woman's family to get rid of her.
12	"Twelfth Decay"; Transliteration: "Dai tō to futa (jūni) wa" (Japanese: 第悼と腐堕話)	October 14, 2010
Kaori and Akira meet up with Natsuno who shows them the bite marks on his neck and tells them to leave the village, fearing that they would get attacked. But Akira and Kaori refuse to do so. Realizing that they won't listen, Natsuno tells them to stay away from him saying that the next time they see him he won't be his own self anymore. Later Toru shows up at Natsuno's house, hesitating to attack him. Natsuno confronts him and questions on why they can't coexist and persuades Toru to leave the village with him. Toru tells him that the hunger is unbearable and he can't take it. Natsuno then attempts to stake him, but immediately stops, realizing he can't kill his friend and offers him to suck his blood. Toru refuses but seeing as he can't resist the massive thirst, attacks Natsuno. Later Tatsumi orders Megumi to attack Kaori's father. Natsuno's father meets Seijirou and tells him that he believes nothing is wrong with the village. Meanwhile Natsuno grows weaker and weaker with anemia, with the frequent visitation of Kaori and Akira who later put up protective charms and seals around Natsuno's room. After taking down the seals, Natsuno's father is convinced that the village is evil and forbades Kaori and Akira from seeing Natsuno saying that he'll take care of Natsuno in their place. After they leave he throws them away. Later, Kaori and Akira's father encounters Megumi as she prepares to bite him. Natsuno's father opens up a window and tells Natsuno that he'd check up on him later and leaves. Outside Natsuno's window, Toru is seen waiting to attack Natsuno.
13	"Thirteenth Tragedy"; Transliteration: "Dai tō to san (jūsan) wa" (Japanese: 第悼と惨話)	October 28, 2010
Natsuno dreams of running away from the village, even though he is too weak to move from his bed. Toshio treats his latest patient, Mikiyasu's father Tokujiro, who is now ill. Tokujiro confirms that he dreams of seeing Nao when Toshio asks him. Toshio knows that Nao is now targeting her father-in-law and requests Tokujiro to stay in hospital, but he refuses. Toshio is stunned to hear from his mother that Kyoko has collapsed in her room. He diagnoses her and discovers she has been attacked by vampires as well. Shinmei Muroi, Seishin's father, insists to visit Tokujiro, who is an old friend, despite being permanently paralyzed from a stroke. Meanwhile, Natsuno sees Toru and tells him to enter. He tells Toru that he won't be able to leave the village. Toru sobs as he bites into Natsuno. Natsuno's father returns home and finds a note from his wife, saying that she is leaving the village now that their son is dead. He enters Natsuno's room and find him dead, where he finally snaps. The helpers and monks at the temple discuss the weird deaths going on and learn that a new funeral home and clinic have been opened recently. Seishin brings his father to see Tokujiro, although both of them said nothing at all. He later suspects that his father knows about the okiagari when he queries about the illness. Kaori and Akira grieve over Natsuno's death. While both of them make plans to protect themselves from okiagari, Megumi has set her sights on Kaori's family, starting with her father. Toshio watches as Kyoko flat-lines, observing the fresh bite marks and open windows beside her bed, he then places bags of ice around the corpse, presumably to preserve the body on the chance she becomes an okiagari.
14	"Fourteenth Death"; Transliteration: "Dai tō to shi (jūyon) wa" (Japanese: 第悼と死話)	November 4, 2010
Megumi visits Kaori at night and tells her that her father is dead. Kaori and Akira's mother calls the Ebuchi Clinic and the doctor, who is really an okiagari, arrives and asks to be invited inside. Natsuno seemingly does not come back as an okiagari, but is cremated. It is shown that people who have turned up missing are being used as a source of food for the weak ones that cannot hunt or those that have just risen. Seishin's father has prepared a letter of greeting to be sent to the Kirishikis, which leads Seishin to suspect that his father is aware that they are the root cause of the village's troubles. After Kyoko dies from her illness and revives as an okiagari, Toshio uses her as a guinea pig and records a video of finding ways to repel the okiagari. He discovers that they are afraid of religious icons and they heal quickly from all sorts of injuries. The only way to kill the okiagari is by cutting off the blood, either through beheading or destroying the heart. He drives a wooden stake through the heart of his wife just before Seishin arrives at the clinic to observe the blood-drenched scene.
15	"Fifteenth Deceit"; Transliteration: "Dai tō to itsu (jūgo) wa" (Japanese: 第悼と偽話)	November 11, 2010
Seishin is appalled by what Toshio has done to Kyoko, and walks out on him without saying anything. Toru starts to leave a single flower outside of Natsuno's window every night to commemorate Natsuno's death. Toshio turns to the patrons of the bistro he frequents to asks for their assistance, but is soon shut down. He visits the town office to find that every single person there has been replaced by office workers who can "only work at night". He confronts these people during the night, only to find Chizuru Kirishiki telling him to stay quiet and that his time will soon come. The Kirishiki's have also started their own funeral home system, where they can more easily switch the coffins for any possible future shiki corpses. Kyoko's funeral is held, where Nurse Isaki gets fed up by the cold reactions of Toshio and decides to hand in a letter of resignation via a fellow nurse. Toshio then remembers that Nurse Yuki has disappeared, and apologizes to the messenger nurse. During the evening outside of the clinic, Toshio is visited by a now risen Natsuno, who asks Toshio if he still thinks Megumi is 'dead'. Natsuno then leaves, telling Toshio that he is not alone.
16	"Sixteenth Skull"; Transliteration: "Dai tō to roku (jūroku) wa" (Japanese: 第悼と髏苦話)	November 18, 2010
Sunako's past is briefly recalled, and the story of how she became a shiki becomes clear. Seishirou Kirishiki sees Toru leaving flowers and tells him that it will only make things worse, and then tells him that Sunako has summoned him. Nao, angry that none of her family have risen, swears vengeance to kill other happy families around her. Toru is extremely scared by the summons from Sunako, as it usually accompanies dire punishments that can even lead to death. Sunako offers him some tea, and Toru explains that shiki cannot eat food, but can still drink liquids if they want to. Sunako starts talking to Toru about how troubled he is of killing Natsuno, which Toru explains that it is only natural for him to feel bad. Sunako then tells him that she once knew a girl like that in her past, then starts telling the story. During the story, Sunako replaces the girl with herself and Toru figures out that this is Sunako's own past. After Sunako became a shiki, her family had hidden her away in a shed and brought a maiden every night for her to kill. One night she decided to run away back into her home, but sees that her own family has moved away and another family has moved into her old house. She then started to look for her family, and she didn't give up even when it was only natural that they would all have died with old age. Next, the recently risen Tanaka (father of Kaori and Akira) is blaming Megumi for turning him into a shiki. Megumi then retaliates by saying that he can't say such things to her, as his mere presence shows that it is obvious he killed as well. She then tells Tanaka that he will need to get his own food starting tonight, and to start with his family. He is shocked and says he will never do something like that, but Megumi tells him that if he doesn't kill them then somebody else will. Tanaka then goes and visits his home to find himself restricted from getting inside. The dog Love starts barking which leads his wife to come out. His wife sees her dead husband and is terrified, and tells him that this is no place for him anymore and to go away. This leads Tanaka to feed from her, which Kaori and Akira finds out. Akira then decides that he will attack the shikis, and tells Kaori to make as many wooden stakes as possible. He finds information from the villagers that someone has moved back into an empty house, and promptly takes a wooden stake and runs to the house. Natsuno can be seen outside in daytime talking to Toshio, and tells him that they have only one chance to foil the Kirishiki's plans of a 'Shiki Town', and how all shiki must be exterminated including himself. Akira goes into the house and finds a sleeping shiki, he is about to put the stake through his heart but is stopped by Tatsumi. Akira then wakes up and finds himself bound and gagged in front of the shiki that he was trying to kill, and the episode ends as the shiki wakes up and finds Akira next to him.
17	"Seventeenth Killing Spirit"; Transliteration: "Dai tō to shichi (jūnana) wa" (Japanese: 第悼と弑魑話)	November 25, 2010
Seishin continues to be plagued with what he should do about the attack of the shiki. Seishin's father goes missing. Seishin realizes that his father knew about the shiki and invited the shiki to his room, on the condition that they leave Seishin's and his mother's room alone. Later on, a traumatized Kaori visits Seishin asking for a name for her grave. Due to the death of her mother and father, and the disappearance of her brother, Kaori believes that Megumi will kill her next, and she has dug up her own grave in preparation. Seishin tells her that she should still try to live. Seishin makes a decision and leaves the temple. Meanwhile, Ritsuko receives a call from one of the nurses – the nurse has been taken hostage. Ritsuko runs to save her, but on the way, she passes a truck with the gagged nurse. Ritsuko stands there in the middle of the road as two shiki approach her. Ozaki drives to Ritusko too late – she has already been bitten. Alone in his hospital at night, Chizuru visits Ozaki. She reveals that Seishin has decided to serve the shiki and visited Sunako that day. Ozaki tells Chizuru that he wants to survive to see the village die, and she bites him. Chizuru tells him to burn all evidence of the deaths.
18	"Eighteenth Night"; Transliteration: "Dai tō to ya (jūhachi) wa" (Japanese: 第悼と夜話)	December 2, 2010
Tatsumi visits Natsuno's house, where Natsuno's half crazed father runs up and stabs him with a knife after opening the front door. He then has a talk with Natsuno saying that Natsuno has turned into a jinrou (werewolf), a rare type of shiki and that he is one also. Tatsumi then says that Akira had disappeared after being tied up but Natsuno has no recollection of that happening. He gets enraged and strangles Natsuno and almost kills him, but then tells Natsuno that he should join them or be killed. Later Ritsuko rises up as a shiki and remembers how she died while Toru and Yoshie come inside to see her. Ozaki is then seen lying in bed struggling after being bitten by Chizuru. Later, Ozaki takes Chizuru to the Kagura festival where she meets the rest of the villagers, but it turns out to be a trap set up by Ozaki, who has bite marks from a different shiki on his arm alongside Chizuru's bite marks on his neck, explaining why he wasn't obeying her orders, and she is exposed as a shiki. The villagers then proceed to try to kill her when suddenly Seishiro and Atsushi barge in with a shotgun in order to save her but are abruptly stopped by Atsushi's father and Atsushi quickly drives off with Seishiro. Chizuru finds herself trapped and unable to escape as the villagers approach her.
19	"Nineteenth Coffin"; Transliteration: "Dai tō to kyū (jūkyū) wa" (Japanese: 第悼と柩話)	December 9, 2010
Chizuru is killed by Megumi's father when he drives a stake through her heart. Ozaki explains to the villagers about the shiki, and their weaknesses. The villagers then go around town, knocking on doors asking if there were any other houses that have been reoccupied and announcing a demon cleansing; in one such house is a woman who has risen up, but is being protected by her daughter. Kaori's undead father enters his family's house once again and tries to talk with Kaori, but Kaori beats him to death with a baseball bat in her traumatized state. Sunako orders Tatsumi to kill Ozaki saying that doing so will stop further problems and then to kill the villagers thereby, lowering their numbers. She laments on how lonely Chizuru must have felt as she died. Seishin continues to contemplate his decision to join the shiki side.
20	"Twentieth Mourning"; Transliteration: "Dai futatō (nijū) wa" (Japanese: 第腐汰悼話)	December 16, 2010
As morning hits the village, the villagers rummage through the buildings and hunt sleeping shiki. The villagers learn that a shiki had killed Mrs. Ozaki. They follow the footsteps, only to discover Atsushi, now a shiki. Atsushi's father kills him by impaling him with a stake and his own bare hands. As nighttime falls, the villagers put the dead shiki in a pit. Ozaki reveals that there are more shiki, and the villagers learn that the shiki might be hiding underground. Seishiro shoots at the villagers, but Natsuno stops him. Meanwhile, Toru tries to force Ritsuko to kill Yasuyo, but Ritsuko refuses—killing is against her nature. Toru releases Yasuyo. The villagers prepare an ambush for the remaining shiki. Other villagers drag out shiki from the pipelines to stake them in the heart. Upon hearing about the shiki killings, Sunako grows scared. She feels that she won't be saved because she killed people. As day comes and light streams through, Ritsuko and Toru hold onto each other. Meanwhile, the shiki take control of a human, and use him to shoot the villagers. Ozaki looks on in horror as Atsushi's father discovers the controlled human in the act, and brutally killing him.
20.5	"Twentieth Mourning and Offense"; Transliteration: "Dai futatō to han (nijū han) wa" (Japanese: 第腐汰悼と犯話)	May 25, 2011 (OVA)
In a flashback, Nao explains to Mr. and Mrs. Hasegawa about her joy of marrying into the Yasumori family. After mentioning her son Susumu, Nao asks the couple if they have any children; Mr. Hasegawa tells her that they lost their children* in an accident. Afterward, Mr. Hasegawa reminds his wife that they are not the only people who have suffered losses; and that he is glad that they moved to Sotoba. In the present, more shiki discover the entrance to the irrigation pipeline and take refuge in it; however, Sadafumi Tamo leads a group of villagers into the pipeline to permanently kill them. The shiki retaliate, but are soon overpowered and retreat further into the pipeline, which leads into a dead end crawl space. Nao has hallucinations about her dead family and repents for her sins. Eventually, the villagers run out of stakes, so they capture and bind the remaining shiki and take them to the surface to be burnt by the morning sunlight. Upon seeing the shiki suffer, Hasegawa shows them mercy by impaling each one's hearts with a metal rod, while the other villagers look on. After Hasegawa finishes by killing a barely-recognizable Nao, his wife consoles him as he falls to his knees, crying.
21	"Twenty-First Slaughter"; Transliteration: "Dai futatō to hito (nijūichi) wa" (Japanese: 第腐汰悼と悲屠話)	December 23, 2010
Sunako fears for her life; the villagers seem ever closer to eliminating all shiki. Tatsumi and Seishin execute a plan to save Sunako, but this is not very reliable due to the preparation of the inhabitants, so Seishin escapes to the temple where he lived and hides away. As the mob tries to enter the building, his mother and friends attempt to stop them, but are brutally murdered. Despite this, Seishin and Sunako escape, with the villagers following his trail of blood. Using a suitcase to hide Sunako from the sunlight, Seishin hides her under some brush and flees, hoping that they will follow him and not notice the suitcase.
21.5	"Twenty-First Blood and Offense"; Transliteration: "Dai futatō-ichi to han (nijūichi han) wa" (Japanese: 第腐汰悼遺血と犯話)	June 22, 2011 (OVA)
In a flashback to right after the events of the first three deaths at Sotoba, a woman named Motoko is shown to be overly protective of her children, going as far as to take them to school everyday. Eventually, as the mysterious deaths start piling up, Motoko's father-in-law dies. Her mother-in-law refuses to let Toshio perform an autopsy on the body, claiming that doctors care about the money more than their patients. Eventually Motoko's husband dies; then, her daughter falls ill. Slowly losing her sanity, Motoko carries her daughter over to the Ozaki clinic; however when she arrives, the clinic is closed (because Toshio is conducting experiments on his risen shiki wife.) She then rushes over to the Kanemasa clinic, which is also closed during the daytime. Motoko's mother-in-law shows up and scolds her for shaming herself in public, and states that her daughter is fine. However, her daughter dies, followed by her mother-in-law. Frightened, Motoko locks herself and her now-ill son in their home, where he dies in her arms and eventually rots. Kanami's mother returns as a shiki, obviously terrified by her new form; but Kanami looks after her, going as far as to feed her mother her own blood. Eventually, Toshio reveals the truth of the shiki to the villagers, who then launch an attack on them. Motoko seeks refuge at Kanami's where she discovers Kanami's risen mother, and tells the other villagers out of envy that her father-in-law took her entire family away, leaving her with nothing. Afterwards, the insane Motoko helps in the fight against the shiki. Eventually, Motoko takes a lighter and fuel up to Yamairi where she starts a fire, which quickly spreads and consumes her.
22	"The Final Hunt"; Transliteration: "Saishū wa" (Japanese: 蔡蒐話)	December 30, 2010
Megumi is discovered and brutally killed, while the forest fire begins to consume the village. Toshio leads a group to try and stop fire so that it won't draw the attention of the outside world, however they fail. The remaining villagers have little time to escape the fire and quickly hide the dead bodies inside a deep pit, so that they won't be found by the people coming to help from the town nearby. After rescuing and reuniting Akira and Kaori in the town, Natsuno engages in a fight with Tatsumi. The fight eventually results in them both falling down the pit, where Natsuno ignites explosives, killing himself and Tatsumi. Sunako hides in the burning church, where Atsushi's father finds her. Before he can kill her, however, Seishin saves her by killing him. As the church goes up in flames, she declares that being forsaken by God, she wants to abandon herself and finally die there. Seishin, who has become a jinrou, talks her out of it, saying that even though she's no longer under God's jurisdiction, she never lost her faith in Him. They are the only surviving shiki who managed to escape the village. As the villagers are driven away from Sotoba, now beyond salvation, Ozaki wonders if his fight has been for nothing, since the village wound up destroying itself. As firetrucks pour down the streets towards the burning villages, they pass a car. The camera moves to show Seishin at the wheel, with a box similar to a familiar suitcase in the back seat. In an after-credits scene, surviving members of Sotoba, including Akira, Kaori, Kanami, Yasuyo and Natsuno's father board a bus, which begins to drive away from the fire-ravaged mountainside.
