= List of Ōkami Kakushi episodes =

Ōkami Kakushi is a 12-episode 2010 Japanese anime television series based on the Konami visual novel of the same name. The series is produced by AIC under the direction of Yoshihiro Takamoto. The series was first broadcast on the TBS television network in Japan between January 8 and March 26, 2010. Two pieces of theme music are currently used during the series for the opening and closing. The opening theme is "Toki no Mukō Maboroshi no Sora" (時の向こう 幻の空) performed by FictionJunction. The closing theme is "Tsukishirube" (月導) by Yuuka Nanri.

== Episode list ==
No.	Title	Directed by	Written by	Original release date
1	"The Town of Jōga"; Transliteration: "Jōga-machi" (Japanese: 嫦娥町)	Yoshihiro Takamoto	Touko Machida	January 8, 2010
Hiroshi Kuzumi and his younger sister Mana Kuzumi arrive in the town of Jōga. As they and their father, Masaaki Kuzumi, are moving into their new apartment, Hiroshi meets Isuzu Tsumuhana, a tomboyish girl who lives next door and immediately latches onto him, proclaiming her love. At school, Hiroshi is warmly welcomed by everyone except class president Nemuru Kushinada, who tells him that his very existence is annoying. Later, Hiroshi learns from Isuzu and her friend Kaname that Jōga is known for its hassaku oranges, and that the harvest festival to the wolf god of the town is near. Hiroshi also notices the old district of Jōga, though Isuzu warns him to stay away from it. At night, Ogasawara, one of the people who welcomed Hiroshi, is hunted through the streets by figures in robes and wolf masks and killed by a girl in ceremonial clothes wielding a giant scythe. At school the next day, Ogasawara's desk is gone, and people don't seem to want to talk about it. Nemuru informs Hiroshi that Ogasawara "transferred".
2	"Brother, Sister"; Transliteration: "Ani, Imōto" (Japanese: 兄 妹)	Shū Watanabe	Hideki Shirane	January 15, 2010
Over breakfast Hiroshi's father discusses his research into a man-sized species of wolf believed to have inhabited Jōga in the past, and tells Hiroshi and Mana a local nursery rhyme about a demon that bites people at night to turn them into wolves. Hiroshi explains to Isuzu his concern over Ogasawara's sudden "transfer". Nemuru has a heated argument with Isuzu after school, but Isuzu later plays it off and tells Kaname and Hiroshi that she just wanted her to tell them about the upcoming Hassaku Festival. They run into Issei, Isuzu's older brother, who seems very interested in Hiroshi's family. While visiting Hiroshi's house, Issei proves popular with Hiroshi's father, helping him with his research, and with Mana, who develops a crush on him. Yet another person is killed by the girl with the scythe.
3	"Impulse"; Transliteration: "Shōdō" (Japanese: 衝動)	Osamu Mikasa	Tōko Machida	January 22, 2010
Issei takes Hiroshi, Kaname, Isuzu, and Mana to the river for a picnic. Kaname and Isuzu go for a swim, and Isuzu accidentally drenches Hiroshi, using the opportunity to flirt with him. Issei lends Hiroshi his sweater, but when it is returned Issei begins acting strangely towards him. When Hiroshi develops a cold, Kaname directs him to Jōga hospital, where he encounters Shigetsu Kushinada, Nemuru's uncle and Jōga's head doctor, who prescribes him pills and takes a blood sample to run tests on. On the way out of the hospital, Hiroshi runs into Issei, who had followed him. Shigetsu meets with a man named Sakaki, who claims to be the head of a pharmaceutical company, and makes a deal with him. Issei drives Hiroshi home, but begins flirting with him, his eyes glowing red, and attempts to kiss him, stopping only when the hassaku juice air freshener in his car is shattered. Issei drops Hiroshi off and apologizes, playing off his attack as a practical joke. Shigetsu informs Nemuru of his encounter with Hiroshi.
4	"Premonition"; Transliteration: "Yokan" (Japanese: 予感)	Hiroaki Akagi	Hideki Shirane	January 29, 2010
Kanoko, a girl with glowing red eyes, kisses her boyfriend in an alley. The next morning, Kaname gives Hiroshi a tour of the library and shows him some of Jōga's legends, such as glowing red lights seen flickering in Old Jōga at night, supposed to bring bad luck to those who encounter them. Issei confronts Hiroshi and makes advances on him, but is stopped by Isuzu. While walking with Mana, Hiroshi notices that many people treat him with hostility, but is drawn to Kaori Mana, a woman playing the violin for a crowd of people. Kaori invites them in for tea and offers to teach Mana to play the violin. Issei is called out to the hospital to pick up medication, and picks up a female underclassman on his way home. She confesses her feelings to him, and he kicks her out of his vehicle. Sakaki meets with Kaori, who reminds him of his deceased girlfriend Mieko. Hiroshi goes to retrieve Mana's hat, but while returning sees Kanoko being chased and killed by the girl with the scythe. He runs for help and finds Sakaki, who reveals that a pack of murderers are roaming Jōga.
5	"Runaway"; Transliteration: "Bōsō" (Japanese: 暴走)	Kaoru Suzuki	Tōko Machida	February 5, 2010
Hiroshi revisits the murder scene he witnessed the previous day, remembering Sakaki's revelation about a group of murderers roaming the city. At school, he confronts Nemuru over her cold attitude towards him. Jōga's Vigilance Committee visits Isuzu's home and advises them to relocate until Issei recovers. Isuzu, concerned, talks to her brother, who reassures her that he is all right and apologizes for making her worry. Hiroshi talks to Kaname and tells her about the girl with the scythe, but she believes he is making it up. She then tells him of a legendary demon that sucks its victims' life force from their mouths at night. That evening, Isuzu discovers her brother has run away. Issei attacks Hiroshi, who remembers Kaname's legend and panics when he sees Issei's eyes are glowing red. He runs away, but Issei chases and catches him. Issei's female classmate shows up and he releases Hiroshi, who runs away, and kisses her. The Vigilance Committee arrives, detaining the girl, and Issei flees but is chased by the cloaked figures and killed by the girl with the scythe. The next morning, Hiroshi is told that Issei transferred, but later in the day Isuzu confides that he was murdered.
6	"Love"; Transliteration: "Koi" (Japanese: 恋)	Shinichi Shōji	Hideki Shirane	February 12, 2010
Hiroshi becomes concerned about Isuzu when she skips school, and goes to take her the notes she missed only to be turned away by Isuzu's mother. Later in the evening, Isuzu calls Hiroshi and arranges to meet with him. Meanwhile, the villagers argue about the village's hassaku shortage and how it is affecting the villagers, and one villager, Kasai, suggests killing an unnamed person to eliminate the "problem" altogether. Isuzu takes Hiroshi to the park and confesses her feelings for him, but Hiroshi sees that her eyes are glowing red and attempts to run away. Isuzu corners him, but they are confronted by the girl with the scythe, revealed to be Nemuru. Isuzu attacks Nemuru, but is defeated after a short fight and, taking Hiroshi, runs away. She tells Hiroshi that she is in love with him and is willing to die if she can be with him, but when he hesitates to reply, she admits that she doesn't wish to be killed by Nemuru, who was watching the scene, and jumps off the roof. She is caught and carried away by the masked figures, and Hiroshi tries to follow, but is stopped by Nemuru. Hiroshi angrily confronts Nemuru for an answer as to what is going on, and she tells him to stay away from Isuzu for the time being and then knocks him out.
7	"Loss"; Transliteration: "Sōshitsu" (Japanese: 喪失)	Hisaya Takabayashi	Tōko Machida	February 19, 2010
Hiroshi awakens in his bed, but realizes what had happened was real when both Isuzu and Nemuru are absent from school. Kaname, concerned over Isuzu's continued absence, contacts Hiroshi and tells him her theory that the Jōga wolves were sentient and could assume human shape. She leaves to conduct further research, but is captured by the Vigilance Committee. Imprisoned, she encounters the girl who Issei kissed. The girl, believing Kaname was like her, tells her that Issei had been executed for breaking the law and that she had become something other than human after he had kissed her.
8	"Complication"; Transliteration: "Sakusō" (Japanese: 錯綜)	Kōji Yoshikawa	Atsushi Oka	February 26, 2010
Nemuru releases Kaname from prison and confirms her theory that they are the Jōga wolves in human form, but warns her not to delve further into her research. Sakaki contacts Shigetsu and obtains data on the Jōga wolves from him. The cloaked and masked figures try to arrest Hiroshi, but Nemuru interferes and is later placed under house arrest and stripped of her duties for her disobedience. After hearing that Sakaki has been hired by the village council to capture Hiroshi and has him at a construction site, she leaves to find him but is knocked unconscious by Sakaki after a long fight. Sakaki contacts Hiroshi, who was actually at home, and then traps him in an abandoned shrine with a bound Nemuru.
9	"Secret Room"; Transliteration: "Misshitsu" (Japanese: 密室)	Yoshihito Nishōji	Hideki Shirane	March 5, 2010
Sakaki tosses Hiroshi a knife before locking up the shrine. Hiroshi pressures Nemuru for answers, and she explains Jōga's secrets to him, saying that he is a special type of human, called a "Temptation", that emits a scent Jōga wolves find irresistible. Meanwhile, Kasai persuades Nemuru's father to disown her and have her executed should she become a Fallen. Later, Kaname, worried that Hiroshi is missing, overhears a conversation between Kasai and a Vigilance Committee member and tells Hiroshi's father what she has learned. Kasai poisons Shigetsu, revealing he knew about the deal with Sakaki, and leaves. Before dying, Shigetsu calls Nemuru's father and tells him of Kasai's treachery, prompting him to launch a search for Hiroshi and Nemuru. Hiroshi, despite nightmares of Nemuru attacking him, frees her, and she struggles to control herself, attempting suicide only to be stopped by Hiroshi. She attacks him, but barely stops herself from kissing him and regains control of herself. Meeting up with Hiroshi's father and Kaname, Nemuru's father leads the search party to the shrine by following Hiroshi's scent and breaks down the door. In the hospital, Isuzu awakens.
10	"Hassaku Festival"; Transliteration: "Hassakusai" (Japanese: 八朔祭)	Kaoru Suzuki	Tōko Machida	March 12, 2010
Hiroshi's father shows him the Counting Rhyme and speculates on the history of the Jōga wolves, while Isuzu, fully recovered, contemplates going to the Hassaku Festival and Nemuru learns of her uncle's murder. Kasai contacts Sakaki and they discuss Sakaki's "new plan", one that involves the Hassaku Festival. At the Hassaku festival, Kaname and Hiroshi discuss the revelations of Joga's secrets and Kaname explains the process of the festival to him. As the priestesses to the white wolf Kannon, Joga's deity, escort a shrine carrying a priestess representing Kannon herself, Hiroshi recognizes Kaori, his sister's former violin teacher, as one of the priestesses. As the festival commences, the girl Issei had kissed, released from prison by Sakaki, attacks under the influence of her curse and kisses a boy. She attacks Hiroshi, but Nemuru and her acolytes intervene and kill her. Sakaki arrives and exposes the secret of the Jōga wolves to the crowd. The resulting panic by the humans causes several Jōga wolves to turn on the crowd with the intention of infecting everyone. Kasai confronts Sakaki, and Sakaki professes his desire to entirely destroy Jōga by flooding the city and fatally stabs Kasai before proceeding to Joga's dam's control room. The Jōga wolves target Hiroshi and Kanade, but Nemuru and Isuzu intervene. Kasai manages to warn a Vigilance Committee member, telling him to only tell the Jōga wolves so as to eliminate the humans. The man decides to expose the danger to the entire crowd. After hearing this, Nemuru, her acolytes, Isuzu, Hiroshi, and Kaname rush to stop Sakaki before he destroys the city.
11	"The End"; Transliteration: "Shūen" (Japanese: 終焉)	Yoshihiro Takamoto	Tōko Machida	March 19, 2010
The Vigilance Committee member warns the whole crowd, and as soon as Nemuru hears this she, Isuzu, and her acolytes run upstairs to get to the dam before Sakaki does, taking a shortcut through the forest while Hiroshi and Kanade continue their way upstairs. Nemuru's father arrives at the scene and the Vigilance Committee member shows him the files Sakaki left behind, the same files Shigetsu gave to Sakaki in his guise as the "pharmaceutical company employee". Nemuru's father realizes they had been tricked by Sakaki all along. Sakaki retrieves a revolver from a tree and shoots and injures a security guard once arriving at the dam before opening the gates, almost killing Nemuru and Isuzu, who had just arrived at the foot of the dam. The water floods Jōga, causing massive amounts of destruction and panic among the citizens. Hiroshi and Kanade arrive at the dam, while Isuzu discovers a trail of blood and follows it into the woods. Sakaki shoots her in the leg and threatens to kill her in front of Nemuru so that she experiences the same pain he did. Hiroshi arrives and tries to protect them, but is beaten up by Sakaki. Nemuru offers herself to Sakaki on the condition that he stop his quest for revenge once she is dead, but before he can shoot her Kaori and the other priestesses arrive. Kaori tells Sakaki to shoot her if he wants to end his grudge against Jōga, but Sakaki attempts to shoot Nemuru instead. Kaori takes the shot before grabbing him and jumping into the river below with him. Some time later, Hiroshi concludes that while most of Jōga's human citizens have left, the city is more peaceful, but worries that the peace may not last long. Upon cajoling from Isuzu, Hiroshi begins to call Nemuru by her first name, accepting her into his circle of friends.
12	"Mysterious Tales of Jōga"; Transliteration: "Jōga-machi kitan" (Japanese: 嫦娥町奇譚)	Tōru Kitahata	Tōko Machida; Hideki Shirane; Atsushi Oka	March 26, 2010
Six months after the Hassaku Festival, Hiroshi, Isuzu, Nemuru, and Kaname meet at Jōga's ice-cream parlour to discuss Kaname's idea for an Occult Research Club, much to Hiroshi's dismay. When Kaname comments on a strange rabbit/frog-like doll, called Usaeru (usagi - rabbit and kaeru - frog), on Nemuru's hand-bag, Hiroshi has a flash-back to an incident a few months prior when Nemuru arrived at his house with an Usaeru costume. She and Mana, both fans of the doll, discussed an imaginary home for Usaeru, with both having very different interpretations. Later, Nemuru prepares a spell to transport Mana to her nightmarish version of Usaeru's home, but Hiroshi is accidentally caught up in it and is attacked by a demonic version of Usaeru. In the present, Isuzu brings up another incident in which she and Kaname volunteered at a maid cafe to see the legendary "Phantom Waiter", set to appear on Jōga's TV station for an interview. Hiroshi was invited, only to first be attacked by a Fallen and then be dressed up as a maid by Isuzu. Nemuru arrives at the cafe shortly afterwards to see the interview, as do a pair of thugs. One of the thugs attempts to kiss Hiroshi, thinking him to be a woman and attracted by his scent as a Temptation, prompting Nemuru to attempt to change into her Hunter uniform in the middle of the cafe before being stopped by Isuzu and Kaname. Before things escalate any further, the "Phantom Waiter", revealed to be none other than Nemuru's father, arrives, takes her scythe from one of the acolytes, and scares the thugs away before collapsing from a strained hip, cancelling the interview. In the present, Hiroshi remembers his encounters with Nemuru and Isuzu and how they had changed towards him and each other.
