= Algeria, History and Civilization =

- Also known as: Arabic: Al-Jazā’ir...Tārīkh wa Ḥadhārah (الجَزَائِر... تَارِيخ وَ حَضَارَة)
- Genre: Animated series; Historical
- Based on: History of Algeria
- Country of origin: Algeria
- Original language: Arabic
- No. of seasons: 1
- No. of episodes: 52 episodes

Production
- Running time: 26 minutes
- Production companies: Studios El Bouraq; Artist Home; Numidia Arts

Original release
- Network: Télévision Algérienne; Canal Algérie; A3; Beur TV; Dzaïr TV
- Release: 2010 – 2010

Related
- Adrar 13, Kalila and Dimna, Atomo, Maher, Inspector Tahar

Algeria, History and Civilization (Arabic: الجزائر تاريخ وحضارة Al jazair tarikh oua hatharat) is a historical animated series from Algeria, that tells the country's history in fifty-two episodes, with an average of twenty-six minutes per episode. It aims to educate Algerian youth on selected aspects of their country's history before its independence from France in 1962.
