= List of Occult Academy episodes =

Occult Academy (世紀末オカルト学院, Seikimatsu Okaruto Gakuin) is a Japanese anime television series produced by A-1 Pictures and Aniplex and directed by Tomohiko Ito. The 13-episode anime premiered in Japan on the TV Tokyo television network on July 6, 2010, and the final episode aired on September 27, 2010. Occult Academy is the third project of Anime no Chikara. It was simulcasted by Crunchyroll an hour after the Japanese broadcast. A series of DVD/Blu-ray releases are made over six volumes. Volumes one through five each contain two episodes from the series and comes with extras, such as bonus songs sung by various voice actors for the characters. The final volume covers the last three episodes There are also four spinoff episodes, the first of which is included with the second volume.

The series' opening theme is the song "Flying Humanoid" (フライングヒューマノイド, Furaingu Hyūmanoido) sung by Shoko Nakagawa, and its ending theme is "Kimi ga Iru Basho" (君がいる場所; "Where You Are") sung by Ayahi Takagaki.

== Synopsis ==
Set in the year of 1999, the story revolves around the mysteries of the Waldstein Academy also known as the "Occult Academy" due to its unorthodox researches involving myths, legends and paranormal activity. The main protagonists are Maya Kumashiro, daughter of the late principal of the academy who assumes his position and Fumiaki Uchida, a time traveler sent from the year 2012 with the mission of finding and destroying the "Nostradamus Key", an unknown item that the Nostradamus Prophecies foretold to be the cause of an alien invasion that will devastate Earth.

== List of episodes ==
No.	Title	Original release date
1	"MAYA's Prophecy"; Transliteration: "Maya no Yogen" (Japanese: マヤの予言)	July 5, 2010
In 1999, Maya Kumashiro attends the funeral of her late father, the principal of Waldstein Academy when a recording left by him summons a demon that starts attacking the students, leaving her with no option but to confront it.
2	"The advent of BUNMEI"; Transliteration: "Bunmei no Tōrai" (Japanese: 文明の到来)	July 12, 2010
Maya successfully assumes her father's place as the academy's headmistress. She later meets Fumiaki Uchida whom makes his appearance from the future.
3	"MIKAZE blows through" Transliteration: "Umashi Kaze, Fukinukete" (Japanese: 美し風、吹きぬけて)	July 19, 2010
Having no luck in finding the Nostradamus Key, Bunmei meets Mikaze Nakagawa at the diner she works in. Meanwhile, people are mysteriously disappearing around the city.
4	"The collapse of BUNMEI"; Transliteration: "Bunmei no Hōkai" (Japanese: 文明の崩壊)	July 26, 2010
Maya and Bunmei discover the cause behind the disappearances and must escape from a nest of Mothmen.
5	"The KOZUE of summer" Transliteration: "Natsu no Kozue" (Japanese: 夏のこずえ)	August 2, 2010
During an in-class demonstration, Kozue volunteers herself into an experiment involving Near death experience but part of herself is left in the afterlife.
6	"BUNMEI's distance" Transliteration: "Bunmei no Michinori" (Japanese: 文明の道程)	August 9, 2010
Kozue's other self becomes trapped in the afterlife. To rescue her, Bunmei delves into the afterlife, although he inadvertently reveals fragments of his past to everyone in the lab.
7	"MAYA's amigo" Transliteration: "Maya no Amīgo" (Japanese: マヤの亜美～ゴ)	August 16, 2010
While investigating a crop circle that mysteriously appeared in the outskirts of the city, Maya discovers that it is a prank orchestrated by the Ami's father, whom wants to have Maya regain her lost passion for the occult.
8	"Mamma AMI~ya!"; Transliteration: "Manma Amīya!" (Japanese: まんま亜美～ヤ！)	August 23, 2010
Maya and Ami relationship becomes estranged since the incident with Ami's father. Before they have a chance to make up, Ami is kidnapped by a pack of chupacabra and Maya gathers all help she can in order to save her.
9	"AKARI of snow" Transliteration: "Yuki no Akari" (Japanese: 雪のあかり)	August 30, 2010
The spirit of a Akari, a deceased child, is accidentally summoned during a séance at the academy and Maya decides to find a way to have her finally rest in peace with the help of her friends.
10	"AKARI of fireplace" Transliteration: "Danro no Akari" (Japanese: 暖炉のあかり)	September 6, 2010
Maya and her friends decide to have a Christmas party to fulfill Akari's last wish. While seeing her old house being torn down, Maya realizes the reason why her father built the Occult Academy.
11	"MAYA's death" Transliteration: "Maya no shi" (Japanese: マヤの死)	September 13, 2010
Mikaze tries to convince Bunmei in a Cult ceremony that Maya is actually the Key of Nostradamus and asks his help to separate Maya from her spellbook, but he ends up warning Maya about Mikaze's intentions instead. Maya fakes her own death with Chihiro's help to dissuade the enemy, but Bunmei leads Mikaze to them. Mikaze is revealed to be a Black Mage and she takes the spellbook and burns it. She immobilizes Bunmei with a spell, while, with Chihiro's help, Maya and the others escape with Mikaze behind their back. Chihiro tries to get Maya away from the village, but their plans are thwarted by Mikaze's brainwashed cultists. Mikaze confronts them and Chihiro has no other choice than to battle her. Chihiro is revealed to be a White Mage.
12	"A thousand wind, the search for beauty" Transliteration: "Sen no Kaze, Bi no Tomeyuki" (Japanese: 千の風、美の尋めゆき)	September 20, 2010
Chihiro battles Mikaze to protect Maya but she ends up being defeated by Mikaze.It is revealed that Mikaze was behind all the strange incidents in the village, having summoned the Mothmen and the Chupacabras With her last ounce of strength, she frees Bunmei from the spell he was put in. Maya is helped by Chihiro's assistant in the form of a flying jaguar. Mikaze manages to get a direct hit and Maya and her guardian plummets and crash at the roof of the Occult Academy. Bunmei reaches Maya in time and reveals that the true spellbook wasn't destroyed, but was only a decoy to fool Mikaze. Mikaze is shocked and tries to kill Bunmei with her Black Magic. Maya snaps a picture of them fighting only to realize that it was the Key of Nostradamus. Bunmei resists her spell and reads aloud the chant to seal all beings of darkness from the area. Maya repeats after him and Mikaze disappears in a brilliant flash of light along with all the other monster and anomalies of the village. The town returns to normal and Maya and Bunmei, having thought that they destroyed the Nostradamus' Key, enjoy once again peace.
13	"MAYA's BUNMEI"; Transliteration: "Maya no Bunmei" (Japanese: マヤの文明)	September 27, 2010
Mikaze is defeated, but Bunmei finds that the future is still unaltered. Maya invited Fumiaki, Bunmei's younger self to the year-end ceremonies. Bunmei contacts the future and is told that meeting his younger self might be the True Nostradamus Key. Maya cancels the opening, evoking Fumiaki's mother's rage. Fumiaki wanders off alone to Occult Academy, while his mother searches frantically for him. Before Bunmei's departure, Bunmei encounters his younger self and a rift in the fabric of time occurs.Fumiaki tries to fight the aliens, but is quickly cast aside. Bunmei grabs the spoon his mother placed in Fumiaki's pocket and regains his Psychokinetic Abilities. He fights the aliens on his own and enters the rift to close it, but not before telling Maya to take care of his younger self. The Rift disappears and Maya and Fumiaki walk off into the distance. In the future, Maya's father, who was revealed to be still alive and commander of the Alien Resistance, finds that the world has changed. He returns to his home, while Curry, Bunmei's favorite dish, is being served.
