= List of Kiss×sis episodes =

Kiss×sis is an anime adaptation of the manga series created by Bow Ditama and animated by Feel. The series revolves around a boy named Keita Suminoe who finds himself the centre of attention of his twin step-sisters, Ako and Riko. The anime adaptation consists of two series: a twelve-episode anime television series and a twelve-part original video animation (OVA) series. The first OVA was released on December 22, 2008, with subsequent episodes released with volumes of the manga until April 6, 2015. The anime television series aired on AT-X between April 5, 2010, and June 21, 2010, and was released on DVD from June 23, 2010.

For the television series, the show's theme song is "Balance Kiss" (バランスKISS, Baransu Kisu) by Taketatsu and Tatsumi, while the ending credit music is "Our Steady Boy" by Yui Ogura and Kaori Ishihara. The ending theme for Episode 12 is "Futari" (ふたり; "The Two of Us") by Ogura and Ishihara. For the OVA series, the show's theme song is "Futari no Honey Boy" (ふたりのハニーボーイ, Futari no Hanībōi; "Our Honey Boy") by Ayana Taketatsu and Yuiko Tatsumi, while the music during the ending credits is "Hoshizora Monogatari" (星空物語; "Starry Sky Story") by Nana Takahashi.

== Episodes ==
| No. | Title | Original release date |
|---|---|---|
| 1 | "Wonderful Days"; Transliteration: "Wandafuru Deizu" (Japanese: ワンダフルデイズ) | March 28, 2010 (pre-release); April 5, 2010 (TV) |
Keita Suminoe has a problem with his twin step-sisters, Ako and Riko, being overly romantic towards him while his parents are away. He is uncertain what to do when his parents cannot attend a parent-teacher session. When Ako and Riko find the notice letter while snooping in his room, they go over to his school, only to be chased by several of their admirers. Keita stops everyone and tells his sisters off for causing a ruckus, but when he realizes why they came, he catches up with them and apologizes, revealing he turned down a recommendation to another school, and that he intends to study to get into their high school.
| 2 | "A Lesson for Two"; Transliteration: "Futarikiri no Ressun" (Japanese: 二 人きりのレッスン) | April 12, 2010 |
Ako decides to help Keita study in order to improve his chance of passing, though both have a little trouble staying focused on the matter at hand. Ako shows Keita her chest in order to encourage him to study, but this backfires when her chest ends up being all Keita can think about in class. Ako decides to try an alternative study method and starts writing the notes on her body. Despite embarrassing himself in school, he fares better on the tests. However, when Keita likens a kiss from Ako to a penalty game, Ako gets mad and corners him, eventually tricking him into getting a wrong answer so he has to take the penalty kiss. They press on, but are interrupted by Riko, who has been learning how to prepare food and made a snack for Keita, though it turns out to taste terrible and Keita spits the food in her face. In the end, Keita manages to improve his grade, if only slightly, and he gives all the credit to Ako, whom he thanks, while Riko watches jealously.
| 3 | "Alluring Sweets"; Transliteration: "Miwaku no Suītsu!" (Japanese: 魅惑のスイーツ!) | April 19, 2010 |
Keita gets annoyed with being kissed by Ako and Riko all the time and instigates a total ban on kissing, much to their disappointment. Overhearing that Keita likes sweet things, Riko tries to make him some chocolate, but can only manage something horrific. After finding one of her father's dirty DVDs, she gives Keita some chocolate lipstick, persuading him to kiss it off her lips. Before they manage to go any further, they are interrupted by Ako who destroys the lipstick. Riko gives Keita another chocolate lipstick, however it was made from the horrible tasting chocolate that she had made, and leaves Keita comically half dead.
| 4 | "Qualifications of a Lover"; Transliteration: "Koibito no Shikaku" (Japanese: 恋人の資格) | April 26, 2010 |
While Keita studies at school, Ako and Riko reminisce about their first year of junior high - the first time they were apart from Keita. Meanwhile, their teacher, Yūzuki Kiryū, eavesdrops on their discussions and begins to worry about exactly what kind of relationship they have with their brother. After studying, Keita runs into Ako and Riko at the local shrine, where they were praying for his success. He remembers when he was young and prayed to marry both Ako and Riko, only to be told by his father that polygamy is illegal. Keita makes his wish and the three siblings return home together.
| 5 | "I'm Sorry!"; Transliteration: "Gomen Nasai!" (Japanese: ゴメンナサイ!) | May 3, 2010 |
While talking to his friends, Keita accidentally gropes his fellow student, Miharu Mikuni, and gets slapped. Ako and Riko become suspicious that Keita has been 'cheating'. When Keita goes to study at the library, Miharu, who is a student librarian, becomes too intimidated by her proximity to Keita to go to the bathroom, believing that he will grope her if she takes her eyes off him. Keita chases after her as she tries to get to a washroom, intending to return a book she dropped (which looks like Miharu's student identification booklet) and ends up dragging her into various hiding spots to hide from Ako and Riko, who are looking for Keita. Unfortunately they end up getting locked in the gym storage room and their hashed escape plan leads to Miharu relieving herself on Keita's back. They eventually manage to escape from the room and Keita promises to keep the incident secret, though he gets beaten up when he accidentally sees that Miharu had removed her wet panties, humiliating her in the process, as Ako and Riko discovers his beaten face.
| 6 | "Uneasiness at Akihabara"; Transliteration: "Munasawagi no Akiba" (Japanese: 胸騒ぎのアキバ) | May 10, 2010 |
Unable to view porn from the internet using the PC their father won at a raffle, Ako and Riko decide to buy erotic games in Akihabara. But Keita ends up accompanying them, so they devise a way to hide their real purpose for going to Akihabara. Ako distracts Keita by taking him to a cosplay shop while Riko investigates the adult section of a game shop. While changing, they run into Ako's teacher, Yūzuki Kiryū, who is a closet otaku (dressed as Mahoro from Mahoromatic Maiden). Riko later encounters her while trying to get a special edition game. After meeting Keita and being reminded about Ako and Riko's crush on him, Yūzuki drags him off to talk to him, inadvertently taking him to a cosplay-themed love hotel. After being found by Ako and Riko, the group encounter Keita's kōhai, and Yūzuki's younger sister, Mikazuki, who covers for Yūzuki by stating she was buying the game for her. In return for bailing her out, she gets Yūzuki to cosplay as Mai Shiranui for her that night.
| 7 | "Wh-What!? A Dripping Wet Midsummer Delusion"; Transliteration: "Na, Nan to~?! Bisho Nure Manatsu no Mōsōkyoku" (Japanese: な、なんと～っ!?びしょ濡れ真夏の妄想曲) | May 17, 2010 |
One of Keita's friends, Toda, coaxes him into going to the pool with him and Mikazuki and inviting Ako and Riko by handing him an erotic magazine. Suspicious of what they might be up to, Yūzuki decides to tail them, despite having a financial dilemma (since admission to the pool is costly). While trying to hide from them in the bathroom, she is found by Ako and Riko who, mistaking her for a peeping tom, soak her with water. With her clothes soaked, Yūzuki borrows Keita's gym outfit. Later that night, Yūzuki becomes entranced by the manly smell of Keita's outfit and masturbates while wearing it and fantasizing about Keita. She wakes up the next day to find that his pants became soaked in the process. Oddly, Keita has a nightmare about his teacher doing "stuff" with him.
| 8 | "It's Always That in August"; Transliteration: "Hachigatsu wa Itsumo Are" (Japanese: 八月はいつもアレ) | May 24, 2010 |
The summer festival arrives, and it is the only day Keita has free from his prep school work. Ako and Riko compete for the opportunity to spend the festival night with him, although they all go to the festival together. A number of incidents involving paraders enables both Ako and Riko to spend some time with Keita alone. They also have to contend with Yūzuki, who is patrolling the fair and catches Riko and Keita in the forest; Mikazuki, who is Miss Mikoshi; and a naughty chick that Ako bought which leads to Keita seeing Miharu peeing in the bushes, humiliating her once again. When Keita returns to his sisters, they barely recognize him due to the beating he received from Miharu.
| 9 | "Turning to God Only in Times of Suffering"; Transliteration: "Kurushii Toki wa Kamidanomi" (Japanese: 苦しい時は神頼み) | May 31, 2010 |
As Keita tries to study, Ako and Riko compete with each other to be the most helpful. While alone in the room, Riko and Keita end up engaging in 'footplay' under the kotatsu until Ako catches on. While investigating good luck charms to help Keita with his studies, Ako and Riko learn of one that is made using pubic hair. After much deliberation, the sisters pluck their own hairs to make the charm and give it to Keita, convincing him not to look inside. Keita takes it to school with him though, and Ako and Riko are understandably embarrassed.
| 10 | "At Last, the Real Thing!"; Transliteration: "Tōtō Honban!" (Japanese: とうとう本番！) | June 7, 2010 |
Keita falls ill just before his exams and Ako and Riko get out of school to nurse him back to health. However, his recovery is hampered by the twins fighting to earn his affections. Both of them end up licking the sweat off his body, which passes the cold to them while Keita makes a full recovery. Yūzuki, who proctors the exam, is surprised to find Keita present. While Keita takes his exams, Ako and Riko remember how Keita supported them when they were taking their exams. After returning from his exams, Keita gives his thanks to the "sleeping" Ako and Riko, who cry in shame for not witnessing that.
| 11 | "Nitpicking a Good Day!"; Transliteration: "Ii Hi, Damedashi!" (Japanese: いい日、ダメ出し!) | June 14, 2010 |
Keita eagerly awaits the results of his exams, with Ako and Riko trying to wish him good luck, though they encounter several unlucky omens along the way to school. When they get to the notice boards, Keita's number isn't listed and the trio become depressed. However, Yūzuki shows up after they leave to put up a few more numbers on the board, including Keita's. After noticing the celebratory preparations that Ako and Riko prepared, Keita cheers up and decides it's best not to waste it. Later that evening, Keita is visited by Miharu, whose dog had picked up Keita's mail containing his results from his mailbox. After reading them, Keita learns that he had in fact passed the exams, and hugs Miharu in his excitement. After Miharu is scared off by Ako and Riko, Keita tells them the good news.
| 12 | "One, Two, Threesome!"; Transliteration: "Ichi, Ni no, San Pī!" (Japanese: いち、にの、3P!) | June 21, 2010 |
After Keita's graduation, Ako and Riko arrive to find they were too late to get the second, much less any of the buttons, off of Keita's blazer. (The 2nd button on male uniform is over the heart and is supposed to be given to the girl he loves to confess his feelings). They decide, against Keita's will, to hold a draw for consolation prizes from Keita, with Ako, Riko, Mikazuki and Miharu as participants. The girls all write down their wishes which are then randomly drawn. Ako's plan backfires and she ends up getting Keita's shirt collar. Mikazuki wins the opportunity for Keita to flip her skirt, though he is unaware that she isn't wearing any underwear. Riko wins a chance to kiss Keita in front of everyone, but is unable to go through with it. Miharu gets the remaining prize; to spend five minutes alone with Keita in the equipment room and allowed to do anything. Keita simply uses the time to thank Miharu, but after a slip up, they end up in a compromising position, leading Ako and Riko to assume the worst. Later that night while Keita sleeps, Ako and Riko make a move on him, though this just gives Keita weird dreams. As he unconsciously grabs his jacket, the button he had been saving for them falls out. Realizing he kept it because he cannot bring himself to choose either Ako or Riko and cares for them individually, they decide to leave him alone for the night, respecting his wish. As the new semester starts, Keita walks to high school hand in hand with Ako and Riko. The ending credits shows Keita being welcomed by juniors on his first day. Keita's classmates also meet him. They start to rush in front of his sisters due to admiration. Miharu also feels embarrassed while Keita watches her. His homeroom teacher Yuzuki Kiryu enters the class and gets angry seeing Ako, Riko and Mikazuki getting cozy with Keita in his class and throws them out. Ako and Riko happily take Keita home after school. At home, the Suminoe family enjoys dinner. The remaining part shows the siblings being kids, now growing up as teenagers. Ako and Riko have a final kiss with Keita as the story ends.

== OVA ==
| No. | Title | Original release date |
|---|---|---|
| 0 | "Start from Scratch"; Transliteration: "Zero Kara Hajimeyō" (Japanese: ゼロから始めよう) | December 22, 2008 |
Keita Suminoe, a third year middle school student, has trouble resisting the sexual advances of his twin step sisters, Ako and Riko, who want him to attend the same high school. However, he has already received a recommendation for a sports school.
| 1 | "Under the Same Roof"; Transliteration: "Hitotsu Yane no Shita" (Japanese: ひとつ やね の した) | May 22, 2009 |
Keita injures his hand at school and Ako and Riko compete to help him out.
| 2 | "Christmas for Two"; Transliteration: "Futari de Kurisumasu" (Japanese: ふたりでクリスマス) | November 20, 2009 |
At Christmas, Keita, Ako and Riko go to a karaoke box where they all end up getting very drunk due to a mistake by the staff, allowing each girl to get some special time with Keita.
| 3 | "Secret Rehearsal"; Transliteration: "Himitsu no Yokō Renshū" (Japanese: ひみつの予行練習) | June 4, 2010 |
While searching through Keita's room, Ako and Riko find a dirty magazine featuring siblings in a threesome. Wondering if they may end up doing the same thing with Keita, they have a 'practice threesome' with each other while using a dummy to represent Keita.
| 4 | "The Supreme Bliss' Hot Spring Trip"; Transliteration: "Shifuku no Onsen Ryokō" (Japanese: 至福の温泉旅行) | November 22, 2010 |
The sibling's parents give Keita tickets to a hot spring resort as a graduation gift and suggest that he take the girls along on the trip. The siblings go to the hot spring resort, end up visiting an erotic museum, and find themselves in some compromising situations involving Ako's unintentional purchase of alcohol.
| 5 | "Engrossed in Bewilderment"; Transliteration: "Gorimuchū de Muchumuchu" (Japanese: 五里霧中でむちゅむちゅ) | June 22, 2011 |
Ako and Riko see their parents kissing at the front door, and hear their mother say, "When you come back, you can have all the fun you want." That evening while studying together, Keita, Ako, and Riko, try to block out the sounds of ecstasy coming from their parents' bedroom, and end up in a compromising position in the process. After becoming so aroused by the sounds their parents' (which, as it turns out, they misinterpreted), Ako, Riko, and Keita cannot get to sleep that night, which leads to further intimacy.
| 6 | "Mmm! Physical Examination"; Transliteration: "Mumumu! na Kenkōshidan" (Japanese: むむむっ!な健康診断) | November 30, 2011 |
As the school takes a fitness exam, Ako and Riko compete with each other for the best results. Meanwhile, Keita gets into all sorts of trouble trying to keep the other boys from spying on the girls.
| 7 | "Peach Flowers Bloom in the Rainy Season"; Transliteration: "Chō Tsuyuni Saita Momo no Hana" (Japanese: 長梅雨に咲いた桃の花) | July 6, 2012 |
As Keita gets soaked on a rainy day, Mikazuki invites him to her house, where he ends up having to hide from Yūzuki when she suddenly comes to visit.
| 8 | "After All!? The Eventful Home Visit"; Transliteration: "Yappari!? Haran no Kateihōmon" (Japanese: やっぱり！？波乱の家庭訪問) | February 6, 2013 |
Yūzuki visits Keita's home for a school visit, where their luck runs true to form and something embarrassing happens. Fortunately for Yūzuki, both of Keita's parents are very open minded - maybe a little too open minded.
| 9 | "Going Mad in Youthful Sweat"; Transliteration: "Kuruoshiki Seishun no Ase" (Japanese: 狂おしき青春の汗) | November 6, 2013 |
Whilst Riko is away, Keita develops a taste for licking Ako's sweat. Later that night, Riko makes her own moves on Keita, only to also end up on the receiving end of his newly awakened fetish.
| 10 | "In That Field of View, Many Colours"; Transliteration: "Aru ya Nashiya wa, Jūninto-iro" (Japanese: あるやなしやは、十人十色) | August 6, 2014 |
Keita inadvertently steps into the girl's bath at the public bathhouse and is forced to hide when Ako, Riko, and the others show up.
| 11 | "A Good Relationship Forever"; Transliteration: "Itsumade mo Ī Kankei" (Japanese: いつまでもイイ関係) | April 6, 2015 |
Keita, Ako, and Riko play a game in which they exchange bits of tapioca between their mouths. After realizing that the tapioca juice was actually alcoholic, Ako takes advantage of Keita's drunkness, soon discovering that he possesses memories of the previous times he was intoxicated. Riko attempts to do the same, only to have it backfire on her.
