= Nura: Rise of the Yokai Clan season 1 =

Nura: Rise of the Yokai Clan
- Season 1
- Blu-Ray Set 1 cover of Nura: Rise of the Yokai Clan
- No. of episodes: 24 + 2 recap episodes

Release
- Original network: Yomiuri TV
- Original release: July 6 – December 21, 2010

Season chronology
- Next → Nura: Rise of the Yokai Clan – Demon Capital

Nura: Rise of the Yokai Clan is an anime series adapted from the manga series of the same title written and illustrated by Hiroshi Shiibashi. The anime series, produced by Studio Deen, aired from July 6 to December 21, 2010.

The season uses four pieces of theme music: two opening themes and two ending themes. From episodes 1 to 12, the first opening theme is Fast Forward performed by Monkey Majik while the ending theme is Sparky☆Start performed by Katate Size (Aya Hirano, Yui Horie and Ai Maeda). From episodes 13 to 24, the second opening theme is Sunshine performed by Monkey Majik and the second ending theme is Symphonic Dream performed by Katate Size (Aya Hirano, Yui Horie and Ai Maeda).

== Episodes ==
| No. | Title | Original airdate | English airdate |
|---|---|---|---|
| 1 | "Becoming the Lord of Pandemonium"; Transliteration: "Chimimoryō no Nushi to Nare" (Japanese: 魑魅魍魎の主となれ) | July 6, 2010 | October 2, 2012 |
Rikuo Nura is the third heir of the Nura Clan as one-quarter yōkai and a middle school student as three-quarters human. Meanwhile, Gyuki secretly plans to usurp Rikuo. At school, Rikuo is invited by classmate Kiyotsugu Kiyojuji to the old school building, where it is rumored to be haunted by yōkai at nighttime. Despite being the grandson of Nurarihyon, known as the Lord of Pandemonium, Rikuo only wants to live his life as a human. At the old school building, Rikuo and his childhood friend Kana Ienaga explore the area with Kiyotsugu and his underling Jiro Shima. Rikuo senses the presence of various yōkai and prevents them from being seen by the others. When a yōkai comes out of the shadows, Rikuo's yōkai attendants Yuki Onna and Aotabo come to the rescue. They are soon revealed to be disguised as Rikuo's classmates Tsurara Oikawa and Kurata. Rikuo then brings Kana to the Nura House, seen as a mansion.
| 2 | "Poison Wings Flutter in the Bamboo Thicket"; Transliteration: "Dokubane wa Shikurin ni Mau" (Japanese: 毒羽根は竹林に舞う) | July 13, 2010 | October 13, 2012 |
A bird yōkai with a weak constitution named Zen, a longtime ally of the Nura Clan, briefly visits the Nura House in order to have a discussion concerning Rikuo's future as the third heir of the Nura Clan. However, Rikuo tells Zen that he does not wish to assume leadership, causing Zen to doubt the future of the Nura Clan. Zen leaves with his snake yōkai subordinate Hebidayu, who urges Zen to break ties with the Nura Clan. Hebidayu suddenly betrays Zen at a bamboo thicket. Nurarihyon's crow yōkai messenger Karasu Tengu takes Rikuo to the bamboo thicket, where Rikuo eventually transforms into his yōkai form in order to kill Hebidayu by the sword. Rikuo shares a drink of sake with Zen before the latter returns to his home. Afterwards, Rikuo proclaims to Karasu Tengu that he will become the third heir of the Nura Clan. The next day, Rikuo in his human form meets with Kana and Kiyotsugu and Shima at school, but Rikuo is embarrassed when Tsurara and Aotabo bring his lunch.
| 3 | "Yura Keikain and the Kiyojuji Paranormal Patrol"; Transliteration: "Keikain Yura to Kiyojūji Kaikitanteidan" (Japanese: 花開院ゆらと清十字怪奇探偵団) | July 20, 2010 | October 20, 2012 |
Introduced as a transfer student, Yura Keikain is knowledgeable about yōkai and can sense their presence. Inviting Rikuo, Kana and Yura to become members of the Kiyojuji Paranormal Patrol, Kiyotsugu decides to hold an inaugural ceremony at the Nura House, rumored to be teeming with yōkai. As Rikuo returns home with Tsurara and Aotabo, the Nura Clan yōkai surprisingly drink sake in his honor for his recent transformation. Kana, Yuri, Kiyotsugu and Shima arrive at the Nura House, where the Nura Clan yōkai are forced to hide for the time being. Much comedy ensues when Kiyojuji Paranormal Patrol explores every room in the Nura House against Rikuo's wishes while the Nura Clan yōkai do their best to hide in the shadows. When the Kiyojuji Paranormal Patrol is attacked by a rat yōkai, Yura reveals herself as an onmyōji, sealing and exterminating the rat yōkai. As Yura and Kana later head home through the shopping district, they are attacked by Kyuso, the head of a gang of rat yōkai called the Kyuso Clan.
| 4 | "The Rat of Darkness Devours the Cat"; Transliteration: "Yami no Nezumi wa Neko o Kurau" (Japanese: 闇の鼠は猫を喰らう) | July 27, 2010 | October 27, 2012 |
Rikuo is soon informed that Yura and Kana were abducted and taken to the Kyuso lair. Once Rikuo arrives at the Kyuso lair, Kyuso demands that Rikuo must write and send a letter abdicating his position as presumptive heir, lest Yura and Kana be killed at dawn. On his way home, Rikuo meets Ryota Neko, the head of a gang of cat yōkai called the Bakeneko Clan, who was being chased by members of the Kyuso Clan. Rikuo brings Ryota Neko to the Nura House in order to recuperate. Although Rikuo is willing to send his letter, Ryota Neko heads off to fight despite being severely injured. Moved by this, Rikuo transforms into his yōkai form as Night Rikuo. As dawn approaches, Night Rikuo, Ryota Neko and the Nura Clan yōkai arrive at the Kyuso lair. Yura and Kana are rescued, while Night Rikuo successfully defeats Kyuso after Ryota Neko fails to do so in his condition. In the aftermath, Yura promises to defeat Night Rikuo next time.
| 5 | "Red Plum Blossoms on the Demons' Mountain"; Transliteration: "Onisumuyama ni Akakiume wa Saku" (Japanese: 鬼棲む山に紅き梅は咲く) | August 3, 2010 | November 3, 2012 |
At school, Kiyotsugu calls Yura, Kana, Tsurara, Shima, Natsumi Torii and Saori Maki to a Kiyojuji Paranormal Patrol meeting. However, Rikuo stays home with a fever due to his recent transformation. While Tsurara runs straight home and nurses Rikuo back to health, the other Kiyojuji Paranormal Patrol members come by for a visit. Upon seeing Tsurara spoon-feeding medicine to Rikuo, Kana becomes confused about the nature of their relationship. Kiyotsugu then informs the Kiyojuji Paranormal Patrol members about a yōkai field trip to Ume Rakuen during the weekend. Upon arriving at Ume Rakuen, a mountain filled with red plum blossoms, the Kiyojuji Paranormal Patrol members go on a hike, where they find the Umewakamaru shrine. They meet up with Professor Adashibara, a yōkai researcher and novelist, who explains that Umewakamaru was a yōkai legend living at the top of Ume Rakuen who attacks and devours lost travelers. Upon learning that Ume Rakuen was formerly known as Mount Nejireme, Rikuo realizes that it is the home of the Gyuki Clan.
| 6 | "A Trap Is Set on the Evil Mountain"; Transliteration: "Ma no Yama ni Shikumareshi Wana" (Japanese: 魔の山に仕組まれし罠) | August 10, 2010 | November 10, 2012 |
As Adashibara takes his leave, the Kiyojuji Paranormal Patrol members are unaware that he was being manipulated by Gyuki's head assistant Mezumaru. Aotabo arrives at Ume Rakuen, but has trouble finding Rikuo. The Kiyojuji Paranormal Patrol members arrive at an inn on the mountain. Kana, Natsumi and Saori bathe in the outdoor hot spring, while Rikuo, Tsurara, Kiyotsugu and Shima set out to find yōkai. Jealous of Rikuo and Tsurara being together, Kana decides to search for them. A flashback reveals that Mezumaru was ordered to lure the Kiyojuji Paranormal Patrol members to Ume Rakuen, and Gyuki's head Gozumaru was ordered to trap and kill them. In the present, Mezumaru attempts to attack Natsumi and Saori, only to be warded off by Yura. When Tsurara gets separated by Rikuo, Kiyotsugu and Shima in the woods, she is suddenly attacked by Gozumaru. Just as Gozumaru is about to kill Tsurara, Rikuo saves Tsurara at the nick of time.
| 7 | "Darkness Moves on the Night of the New Moon"; Transliteration: "Shingetsu no Yoru ni Yami ga Ugoita" (Japanese: 新月の夜に闇が動いた) | August 17, 2010 | November 17, 2012 |
While Yura continues to ward off Mezumaru from Natsumi and Saori, the Sanba Garasu (Kuromaru, Tosakamaru and Sasami), who are Karasu Tengu's children, arrive and capture Mezumaru. Aotabo manages to find Kiyotsugu and Shima lying down in a field, bringing them to the inn before leaving. Engaging in a swordfight against Gozumaru, Rikuo manages to hold his own while still in his human form. However, Rikuo finally transforms into Night Rikuo and defeats Gozumaru. Meanwhile, Nurarihyon tells Zen that he trusts Rikuo to discern Gyuki's true intentions. As Kana continues to search for Rikuo and Tsurara, Kana sees Night Rikuo carrying Tsurara in his arms. Leaving Tsurara in Kana's hands, Night Rikuo heads off to find Gyuki's mansion and uncover the truth under the new moon.
| 8 | "Cold-Blooded Umewakamaru!"; Transliteration: "Umewakamaru, Muzu!" (Japanese: 梅若丸、無残!) | August 24, 2010 | November 24, 2012 |
Night Rikuo confronts Gyuki for his assassination attempts. In the past, Gyuki was once a human named Umewakamaru, a miracle child born into nobility. After his father Yoshidano Shosho Korefusa died, his mother Hanoko remarried for survival and left Gyuki at a monastery, where he excelled at everything. News of Hanoko's illness prompted Umewakamaru's desire to visit her. Umewakamaru was deceived by two women leading him to Mount Nejireme, where he discovered that Hanoko was devoured by the yōkai Gyuki. Maddened with grief, Umewakamaru killed Gyuki. In his cold-blooded state, Umewakamaru attacked and devoured lost travelers. He gradually become known as Gyuki. During the first encounter with Nurarihyon, Gyuki was easily defeated in battle. Though anticipating execution, Gyuki was offered to become one of Nurarihyon's officers. Gyuki eventually accepted the offer and swore his loyalty to Nurarihyon.
| 9 | "Gyuki's Beloved Nura Clan"; Transliteration: "Gyūki no Aishita Nura-gumi" (Japanese: 牛鬼の愛した奴良組) | August 31, 2010 | December 1, 2012 |
In the present, Night Rikuo defeats Gyuki in battle. The Sanba Garasu arrives at Gyuki's mansion as Gyuki claims that he only had the best interest of the Nura Clan at heart despite his betrayal. Night Rikuo then prevents Gyuki from committing hara-kiri. The next day, Gyuki is told by Rikuo in human form to stay at the Nura House and be a part of the Nura Clan as a family. At a playground, the rest of the Kiyojuji Paranormal Patrol members discuss recent events before they decide to search for more yōkai. Before the upcoming general assembly, Tsurara shockingly learns that Gozumaru and Mezumaru will be temporarily staying at the Nura House. During the general assembly, the yōkai council members gather at the Nura House. Announcing his intention to succeed Nurarihyon as the third heir, Rikuo pardons Gyuki for his conduct of treason, much to the surprise of Hitotsume Nyudo, who is opposed to this judgment.
| 10 | "Eating the Fruit from Beyond the Evil Mirror"; Transliteration: "Makyō Kitarite Kajitsu o Kurau" (Japanese: 魔鏡来りて果実を喰らう) | September 7, 2010 | December 8, 2012 |
Kana has a recurring dream of when she was six years old and looked into Ungaikyou, a mirror yōkai who promised to take her away on her thirteenth birthday. On the school rooftop, Kiyotsugu gives Kana a Voodoo doll as a birthday gift. While Kana heads to the train station, Kiyotsugu tells Yura, Natsumi and Saori about the legend of Ungaikyou. Before Rikuo arrives at the school rooftop, Kiyotsugu reveals that he also has a Voodoo doll. Kana becomes trapped in an alternate world at the school, but she eventually communicates with Kiyotsugu via the Voodoo dolls, which have a built-in cellphone function. Searching all the boys' school restrooms, Rikuo finally finds Kana. Before Kana is pulled into Ungaikyou, Night Rikuo saves Kana at the last second and defeats Ungaikyou. Now infatuated with Night Rikuo, Kana wants to know more about him. Night Rikuo takes Kana to Bakenekoya, a yōkai eatery owned by Ryota Neko. The next day, Kana asks Rikuo if Night Rikuo is his friend.
| 11 | "The Vanguard Wind Blows from the West"; Transliteration: "Senjin no Kaze, Nishi no Kata Yori" (Japanese: 先陣の風、西の方より) | September 14, 2010 | December 15, 2012 |
At Bakeneko Alley, Ryota Neko notices that a supposed gust of wind has torn up the clothes of Saburo Neko, who was sweeping outside. Soon after, Nurarihyon reluctantly permits Hihi to investigate the incident at Bakeneko Alley. However, Ryota Neko and the Sanba Garasu later learn that Hihi was assassinated. Because of this, Rikuo is forced to increase his bodyguards from two to six, meaning that Kubinashi, Kappa, Kejoro and Kurotabo will be joining Tsurara and Aotabo as Rikuo's attendants. The yōkai council members are also assigned their own bodyguards. While roaming around the shopping district with Natto Kozou, Nurarihyon encounters Yura, who is experiencing a crisis about her confident beliefs against yōkai. At school, Kiyotsugu informs Rikuo, Kana and Tsurara that Shikoku has the largest number of yōkai in Japan. While Yura opens up to Nurarihyon, they are attacked by a kamaitachi yōkai named Muchi, who can manipulate poisonous wind. Yura leaps to defend Nurarihyon and takes him safely to a building rooftop, though she is unaware that this old man is really a yōkai.
| 12 | "Tamazuki and the Seven Shadows " Transliteration: "Tamazuki to Nanatsu no Kage" (Japanese: 玉章と七つの影) | September 21, 2010 | December 22, 2012 |
As Rikuo spots Karasu Tengu flying out of panic, it is deduced that Nurarihyon was wandering around outside. As Muchi disables the building elevator and forces Yura to climb the stairwell, Muchi targets Nurarihyon at the building rooftop. Nurarihyon manages to stealthily kill Muchi with a dagger before Yura reaches the building rooftop, though Nurarihyon leaves without saying goodbye to Yura, who was relieved that he did not get hurt. Nurarihyon then tells Natto Kozou that he will not be returning home for awhile. As Rikuo, Kana, Tsurara, Aotabo walk home from school, Tsurara realizes that Kana may be in love with Night Rikuo. Kubinashi, Kappa and Kejoro sense the presence of a yōkai, who unfortunately cannot be located. Rikuo comes across the fearsome Inugamigyobu Tamazuki, the fearsome leader of the Seven Phantom Travelers of the 88 Demons of Shikoku, while Kana is briefly harassed by Tamazuki's lackey Inugami. As the Seven Phantom Travelers make themselves visible, Tamazuki proclaims his plan to take over the land and destroy the Nura Clan.
| 12.5 | "Lord Gyuki's Rebellion: The Whole Story " Transliteration: "Gyūki-sama Muhon, Tenmatsu" (Japanese: 牛鬼様謀反、顛末) | September 28, 2010 | April 2, 2013 |
This is a recapitulation of episodes 1 through 12.
| 13 | "The Inugamigyobu Tanuki Tamazuki's Beckoning " Transliteration: "Inugamigyōbu Danuki Tamazuki no Temaneki" (Japanese: 隠神刑部狸玉章の手招き) | October 5, 2010 | April 2, 2013 |
At the Nura House, Karasu Tengu frantically worries when Nurarihyon has not come home as of yet. When news of the Seven Phantom Travelers reaches the Nura House, the Nura Clan yōkai begin to worry. The next day at school, Rikuo, Yura and Kana overhear Kiyotsugu informing Shima, Natsumi and Saori that the Seven Phantom Travelers caused calamities in Ukiyoe Town. As Yura and Kana later head home, Yura incurs an injury when she finds herself up against a fire-breathing phoenix yōkai named Inuhoo, though the Sanba Garasu timely arrives and chases away Inuhoo. During another general assembly, Rikuo leads the Nura Clan in Nurarihyon's absence, telling the yōkai council members, including Hihi's son Shōei, that they should not take unauthorized actions but instead unite in arms. Just then, Inugami arrives at the Nura House and kills a fish yōkai husband, leaving the fish yōkai wife in shock. Inugami transforms into his dog yōkai form and runs rampant inside the Nura House, luring Rikuo and his attendants outside, where Tamazuki and the Seven Phantom Travelers are waiting.
| 14 | "Fierce Fire and Sudden Rain " Transliteration: "Gōka to Shūu" (Japanese: 劫火と驟雨) | October 12, 2010 | August 20, 2013 |
Tamazuki and the Seven Phantom Travelers leave after making a threat to the Nura House. The next day, Rikuo invites Kana, Kiyotsugu, Shima, Natsumi and Saori to the Nura House for a yōkai training camp, though Yura is unable to swing by. Nurarihyon and Natto Kozou travel to the Shikoku Mountain, while Gozumaru and Mezumaru trail a reptile yōkai named Gangi Kozo to the entrance of the hideout of Tamazuki and the Seven Phantom Travelers, found at the abandoned Ukiyoe Town Skyscraper. With the Nura House under repairs due to the altercation with Tamazuki and the Seven Phantom Travelers, Tsurara believes that Rikuo and his friends can do other fun activities rather than an expedition. Gangi Kozo finally strikes back at Gozumaru and Mezumaru, forcing them to retreat. Pretending to run an errand, Rikuo transforms into Night Rikuo and accompanies Kappa against Gangi Kozo at in a fierce water fight at a water purification plant, but Inuhoo suddenly swoops in and rescues Gangi Kozo. Yura watches the battle scene from afar, but no one is there when she arrives. Rikuo returns to the Nura House, where his friends are unaware what really happened.
| 15 | "The Fighting Girls " Transliteration: "Tōju, Hyakka Ryōran" (Japanese: 闘女、百花繚乱) | October 19, 2010 | August 20, 2013 |
One of the Seven Phantom Travelers named Kagibari Onna poses as a waitress at Bakenekoya. During a general assembly, Sasami informs Rikuo that Mottainai Obake was ambushed at Oeteke Forest. Tsurara encourages Kana, Kiyotsugu, Shima, Natsumi and Saori to exercise in the courtyard of the Nura House. Having a brief encounter with Kagibari Onna in a back alley, Yura finds herself at the Nura House. After Yura leaves by sundown, Kejoro is tasked with ensuring her safety. Rikuo learns from Karasu Tengu that Kagibari Onna is acting as a spy for Tamazuki. Rikuo transforms into Night Rikuo, accompanying Aotabo and Kurotabo to Bakenekoya. It is learned that Hitotsume was unintentionally giving intel to Kagibari Onna. Kiyotsugu is jealous when Kana and Shima both caught a glimpse of yōkai at the Nura House. Yura lures Kagibari Onna at a construction site, only to be easily defeated. Kejoro arrives and faces Kagibari Onna in a hair fight. Karasu Tengu and the Sanba Garasu bring Night Rikuo to the construction site, where Night Rikuo lets off Kagibari Onna with a warning. When Yura wakes up, Night Rikuo walks away without telling her the whereabouts of Kagibari Onna.
| 16 | "The Sublime Spirit Burns Crimson " Transliteration: "Ketakaki Tamashii, Kurenai ni Moeyu" (Japanese: 気高き魂、紅に燃ゆ) | October 26, 2010 | August 20, 2013 |
Informing the other Kiyojuji Paranormal Patrol members that many shrines of local deities in Ukiyoe Town have been destroyed by an unknown vandal, Kiyotsugu tells them that they must investigate. Rikuo secretly has Aotabo and the Sanba Garasu as escorts. Rikuo and Tsurara find a torn kimono sleeve near a shrine, where Yura comes out of hiding from the bushes and suspects that Rikuo may be a two-timer. Meanwhile, Nurarihyon and Natto Kozou meet Tamazuki's father Inugamigyobu Danuki in the Shikoku Mountain. Deducing that Tamazuki wants to destroy the local deities and weaken the Nura Clan's source of power, Rikuo sends his attendants to guard the remaining shrines in Ukiyoe Town. Kiyotsugu and Shima haphazardly approach a shrine targeted by Lord Sodemogi, the vandal in question. Shima kicks a soccer ball at Lord Sodemogi, preventing him from cursing Kiyotsugu by tugging on his sleeve. Ensuring the safety of Kiyotsugu and Shima, Rikuo and Tsurara corner Lord Sodemogi, but Inuhoo and Tearai Oni intercept until Aotabo and the Sanba Garasu arrive on the scene. Inuhoo is burned alive by the Sanba Garasu, while Tearai Oni is forced to retreat from Aotabo.
| 17 | "Natsumi and Lord Senba"; Transliteration: "Natsumi to Senba-sama" (Japanese: 夏実と千羽様) | November 2, 2010 | August 20, 2013 |
After finding a small shrine still intact, the Kiyojuji Paranormal Patrol members decide to have dinner at the Nura House. Carrying a handful of paper cranes, Natsumi runs into Kurotabo, though she is unaware that he is a yōkai. Karasu Tengu tells Rikuo and Tsurara that the small shrine belongs to a local deity named Lord Senba. Natsumi pays her respects to Senba at his shrine. When Lord Sodemogi curses Natsumi, Kurotabo scares away Lord Sodemogi. While Natsumi is admitted to the hospital, Rikuo and Kurotabo are greeted by Senba, who affirms that defeating Lord Sodemogi may be the only way to break Natsumi's curse. Rikuo transforms into Night Rikuo as the moon rises. Night Rikuo and Kurotabo track Lord Sodemogi in the woods. When Lord Sodemogi approaches a large shrine belonging to Princess Koke, Kurotabo easily defeats Lord Sodemogi, who dies before telling Night Rikuo that Natsumi will succumb to the curse nonetheless. Thanks to her friends hanging paper cranes on Senba's shrine, Natsumi recovers from her curse after having a vision of Senba at the operating table. The next day, Natsumi happily visits Senba's shrine with her friends.
| 18 | "The Evil Dog Howls at the Ruins"; Transliteration: "Kyōken, Haikyo ni Hōkōsu" (Japanese: 凶犬、廃墟に咆哮す) | November 9, 2010 | August 20, 2013 |
At the Shikoku Mountain, Danuki warns Nurarihyon that Inugami is a violent and dangerous yōkai. Meanwhile, the evil Inugami impatiently seeks bloodlust for Rikuo. While Rikuo hangs out with his friends at the Nura House, Rikuo's attendants are on standby. Kiyotsugu informs the other Kiyojuji Paranormal Patrol members that a projector inside the auditorium of the old school building is supposedly haunted by a yōkai. Rikuo stalls his friends from leaving the Nura House until he receives a phone call from Inugami, who posted online about the projector. Kana, Kiyotsugu, Shima, Natsumi and Saori meet up with Yura on the way there, as Kiyotsugu was unknowingly swindled into purchasing a wooden sword. As they all enter the auditorium, Kiyotsugu and Shima go inside the projection room, while Rikuo finally arrives. Rikuo's attendants fight their way inside the old school building teeming with stray yōkai. As Yura evacuates the other girls, Rikuo prepares to retrieve Kiyotsugu and Shima. However, Inugami comes out of the shadows and confronts Rikuo for siding with humans. Rikuo's attendants arrive to surround Inugami, but Inugami transforms into his dog yōkai form and targets Rikuo.
| 19 | "The Curtain Falls in the Darkness"; Transliteration: "Maku wa Yami Yori Hiraku" (Japanese: 幕は闇より開く) | November 16, 2010 | August 20, 2013 |
A flashback reveals that Inugami was ostracized from human society prior to joining Tamazuki and the Seven Phantom Travelers. Tamazuki learned that Inugami's true power is awakened by hatred and anger. In the present, Yura protects the other girls from the stray yōkai in the hallway, while Kubinashi restrains Inugami with unbreakable strings in the auditorium. Inugami still manages to break free, as he proclaims that yōkai stand above humans according to Tamazuki. With Inugami's strength of darkness increasing, Rikuo's attendants are easily defeated by Inugami. As the sun sets, Rikuo transforms into Night Rikuo and easily slashes Inugami. Night Rikuo follows Inugami outside the main school building, where Inugami reverts to his human form after being easily defeated by Night Rikuo. Tamazuki suddenly arrives, threatening the life of Night Rikuo and retrieving Inugami in a breeze.
| 20 | "The 7:3 Pledge of Loyalty"; Transliteration: "Shichibun Sanbun no Sakazuki" (Japanese: 七分三分の盃) | November 23, 2010 | August 20, 2013 |
Danuki informs Nurarihyon that Tamazuki possesses a legendary treasure called the Devil's Blade. Tamazuki gathers the 88 Demons of Shikoku in preparation for a full-scale attack on the Nura Clan. At night, Shōei goes to the Ukiyoe Town Skyscraper in order to avenge the death of Hihi, but Tearai Oni easily overwhelms Shōei. The Sanba Garasu quickly rescue Shōei while staving off Tearai Oni. With Shōei recuperating at the Nura House, Rikuo is encouraged by Zen, Gyuki, Mokugyo Daruma and Garasu Tengu to form his own Night Parade of Hundred Demons since Nurarihyon already has one. Later on, Tsurara, Aotabo, Kurotabo and Kubinashi pledge loyalty to Rikuo during a sake ritual. With Shōei still bent on vengeance, Rikuo starts to form his Night Parade.
| 21 | "Towards the Sunrise"; Transliteration: "Akatsuki ni" (Japanese: 暁に) | November 30, 2010 | March 02, 2013 |
The Nura Clan hears word that Tamazuki and the 88 Demons of Shikoku crossed Chichibo Pass right before sunrise and destroyed its fortress. Nurarihyon, Natto Kozou and Danuki take a sleeping car while discussing the gruesome history of the Devil's Blade. In the streets, Kana chances upon Tamazuki, who claims that he is similar to Night Rikuo, much to Kana's disagreement. Yura steps in to defend Kana from Tamazuki, causing him to fall back. As Night Rikuo sits in the foyer of the Nura House, offering sake to those who will join his Night Parade. As Tamazuki and the Seven Phantom Travelers head out for battle, Tamazuki kills some members of the 88 Demons of Shikoku with the Devil's Blade in order to absorb more power. Before Night Rikuo and his Night Parade head out for battle, Hitotsume stands in the way of this rather foolish mission. With Gyuki believing that there is still a chance, Night Rikuo mobilizes his Night Parade.
| 22 | "Darkness and Ice"; Transliteration: "Yami to Kōri" (Japanese: 闇と氷) | December 7, 2010 | March 09, 2013 |
While taking a bath together at Kana's house, Kana tells Yura that Tamazuki is very different from Night Rikuo. In the middle of the shopping district, Gozumaru and Mezumaru poorly disguise themselves, learning from some members of the 88 Demons of Shikoki that Tamazuki possesses the Devil's Blade. However, Tamazuki attacks Gozumaru and Mezumaru with the Devil's Blade shortly afterwards. When Night Rikuo and his Night Parade soon arrive, Tamazuki transforms into his tanuki yōkai form for the battle commences. As the battle progresses, Night Rikuo spars with Tamazuki. Night Rikuo is brought to his knees when Yosuzume blinds him with her black feathers. As Night Rikuo refuses to join Tamazuki's ranks, Tamazuki attempts to kill Night Rikuo, but Tsurara timely arrives and blocks the blow. Yosuzume then blinds Tsurara as well as the dueling yōkai, including Kejoro, Kagibari Onna, Kubinashi and Inugami. Kurotabo and Shōei encounter Gozumaru and Mezumaru gravely injured. As it is revealed that Tsurara froze her left eye when her right eye was blinded by Yosuzume, Tsurara defeats Yosuzume by encasing her in ice and restores everyone's eyesight.
| 23 | "The Devil's Blade"; Transliteration: "Maō no Kozuchi" (Japanese: 魔王の小槌) | December 14, 2010 | March 16, 2013 |
Yura leaves Kana's house in search of yōkai, though Kana follows after Yura. Shōei brings Gozumaru and Mezumaru to be tended by Zen in the battlefield. As the battle intensifies, Kappa, Aotabo, Kejoro and Kubinashi each fare well against Gangi Kozo, Tearai Oni, Kagibari Onna and Inugami. Tamazuki then uses the Devil's Blade to mercilessly slaughter his own comrades, including Kagibari Onna. Kiyotsugu, Shima, Natsumi and Saori head towards the shopping district after learning about yōkai sightings. Yura comes face-to-face with Tamazuki, but Night Rikuo comes to her rescue. As Rikuo's attendants restrain Tamazuki from attacking Night Rikuo, Inugami abducts Kana as collateral. Instead, Tamazuki slaughters Inugami, who remained loyal to the very end. After acquiring Inugami's strength in the Devil's Blade, Tamazuki faces Night Rikuo in a final showdown.
| 24 | "The Moon Is in the Sky"; Transliteration: "Tsuki wa Sora ni Aru" (Japanese: 月は空にある) | December 21, 2010 | March 23, 2013 |
Night Rikuo and Tamazuki move their fight to a building rooftop. Kiyotsugu, Shima, Natsumi and Saori finally catch up to Kana and Yura in the middle of the shopping district. As daybreak approaches, Night Rikuo struggles in his battle against Tamazuki. Rikuo becomes one with Night Rikuo after coming to the realization that there is a moon in the morning sky. As a flurry of cherry blossoms surrounds the area, Tamazuki is no match against Night Rikuo, who destroys the Devil's Blade and releases the deceased souls. Although Tamazuki's power gradually fades away, Nurarihyon intercepts Night Rikuo from delivering a final blow. Danuki scolds Tamazuki for his heinous actions and begs all the yōkai to forgive him. Two days later, Rikuo recovers from a deep sleep. Nurarihyon tells Rikuo that Tamazuki and Danuki are now back in Shikoku. Rikuo has a toast with his attendants and the council members. With life at the Nura House returning to normal, Rikuo's friends come by for a visit, though Kana suspects that Rikuo looks a little like Night Rikuo.
| 24.5 | "The Afterglow of Youth"; Transliteration: "Shōnen Tachi no Zanshō" (Japanese: 少年たちの残照) | December 28, 2010 | March 30, 2013 |
This is a recapitulation of episodes 13 through 24.
