= Nura: Rise of the Yokai Clan – Demon Capital =

- Blu-Ray Set 1 cover of Nura: Rise of the Yokai Clan – Demon Capital
- No. of episodes: 24 + 2 recap episodes

Release
- Original network: Yomiuri TV
- Original release: July 5 – December 20, 2011

Season chronology
- ← Previous; Nura: Rise of the Yokai Clan

Nura: Rise of the Yokai Clan is an anime series adapted from the manga series of the same title written and illustrated by Hiroshi Shiibashi. The anime series, produced by Studio Deen, aired from July 5 to December 20, 2011.

The season uses four pieces of theme music: two opening themes and two ending themes. From episodes 25 to 36, the first opening theme is Hoshi no Arika performed by LM.C while the ending theme is Orange Smile performed by Katate Size (Aya Hirano, Yui Horie, and Ai Maeda). From episodes 37 to 48, the second opening theme is The LOVE SONG performed by LM.C while the ending theme is Departure performed by Katate Size (Aya Hirano, Yui Horie, and Ai Maeda).

== Episodes ==
No. overall	No. in season	Title	Original airdate	English airdate
25	1	"The Nura Clan's Third Heir Awakens"; Transliteration: "Kakusei, Nura-gumi Sandaime" (Japanese: 覚醒、奴良組三代目)	July 5, 2011	January 28, 2014
In the past, Rikuo Nura was five years old when he shockingly witnessed his father Rihan Nura being stabbed from behind by a mysterious black-haired girl while observing the Japanese roses outside. When Rikuo was eight years old, he played pranks on Tsurara Oikawa, Aotabo and Kurotabo. Nurarihyon also taught Rikuo how to dine and dash. During a general assembly, Gagoze, who infamously kidnapped and ate children, believed that he was destined to assume leadership, though Nurarihyon declared that Rikuo would become the third heir of the Nura Clan. However, Rikuo refused since his elementary school classmates previously told him that all yōkai are evil. The next day, Rikuo was picked up from school by Karasu Tengu after purposely missing the bus. Once at home, Rikuo learned that the bus carrying his classmates was buried in a landslide. Rikuo transformed into Night Rikuo for the first time, leading his Night Parade of Hundred Demons and realizing that Gagoze caused the landslide. After Rikuo's attendants rout the Gagoze Alliance, Rikuo killed Gagoze and saved his classmates, declaring that he will protect humans as the third heir of the Nura Clan. In the present, Rikuo vows to rebuild the Nura Clan.
26	2	"Two Justice"; Transliteration: "Futari no Seigi" (Japanese: 二人の正義)	July 12, 2011	January 28, 2014
At a shrine, a girl named Shinako Suganuma is seemingly terrorized by a yōkai named Jami looming over her bedside. Discovering that Jami was protecting Shinako from the corrupt priest, Night Rikuo then recruits Jami into the Nura Clan. At a yōkai bar in the shopping district, two yōkai impersonate Aotabo and Kurotabo, of which the real ones arrive and kick out the fake ones. The fake Aotabo and the fake Kurotabo are easily defeated by two male onmyōji. When the bar waitresses give all their attention to Kurotabo, Aotabo walks out and is soon overpowered by the two male onmyōji before Kurotabo later finds Aotabo passed out in the alley. Meanwhile, the Kiyojuji Paranormal Patrol decides to search for Yura Keikain, who has been absent from school. Rikuo finds Yura in an abandoned area having a private training session. The two male onmyōji, revealed to be Yura's older brother Ryuji Keikain and Yura's adopted childhood friend Mamiru Keikain, soon appear. Realizing that Rikuo is a yōkai, Ryuji attempts to attack him. However, Yura is eventually defeated when she defends Rikuo from Ryuji. When night falls, Rikuo transforms into Night Rikuo right in front of Yura.
27	3	"Yura's Realization"; Transliteration: "Keikain Yura no Nattoku" (Japanese: 花開院ゆらの納得)	July 19, 2011	January 28, 2014
Before the battle commences, Ryuji activates Gyogen, flowers that can melt anything upon contact. Ryuji challenges Night Rikuo to survive for three minutes. Despite being severely injured, Night Rikuo manages to survive. Ryuji suddenly summons a trigram field as a ruse, but Night Rikuo easily counters the attack. After Night Rikuo slashes Ryuji with his sword, Mamiru then charges at Night Rikuo. Ryuji realizes that he is not wounded because Night Rikuo possesses the spirit blade Nenekirimaru, a sword designed only to harm yōkai. Before Mamiru can deliver the final blow, Rikuo's Night Parade soon intercepts while Yura comes to the realization that Rikuo is Nurarihyon's grandson. Before Ryuji and Mamiru take their leave, they inform Yura that her older brothers Shuji Keikain and Koreto Keikain were killed by Hagoromo Gitsune, leader of the Kyoto Yokai. After Tsurara tends to Yura at the Nura House, Yura asks Night Rikuo whether he is a human or a yōkai. Night Rikuo replies that he is the same person, whether he is a human by day or a yōkai by night.
28	4	"Nurarihyon and Princess Yo"; Transliteration: "Nurarihyon to Yōhime" (Japanese: ぬらりひょんと珱姫)	July 26, 2011	January 28, 2014
400 years ago during the Keicho era, the Nura Clan became the most feared in Kyoto. A beautiful but sheltered woman named Princess Yo had the godly gift of curing diseases and healing wounds, but her father charged exorbitant fees from the customers. Princess Yo was protected from being the target of the Kyoto Yokai by her bodyguard Koremitsu Keikain, who soon bestowed Nenekirimaru to her. Afterwards, Nurarihyon appeared in Princess Yo's bedroom at night, taking interest in her beauty and godly gift. Meanwhile, Hagoromo Gitsune ordered the Kyoto Yokai to bring back a noble human's liver. Nurarihyon later took Princess Yo to the Nura House, introducing her to his comrades. Although he surprised her with a marriage proposal, she insisted that he should not bother to visit her again. The next day, Princess Yo's father and bodyguards ended up being killed by two members of the Kyoto Yokai named Satori and Oni Hitokuchi. When Nurarihyon arrived on the scene, the lone surviving Koremitsu revealed that Princess Yo was captured by the Kyoto Yokai at Osaka Castle, whereas Nenekirimaru was left behind.
29	5	"Towards Today"; Transliteration: "Ima e to Tsunagu" (Japanese: 今へと繋ぐ)	August 2, 2011	January 28, 2014
Against the plea of Gyuki, Nurarihyon took Nenekirimaru with him as he headed towards Osaka Castle, where many princesses with special abilities were held hostage. Before Hagoromo Gitsune prepared to ingest Princess Yo's liver, Nurarihyon stood in the way. Nurarihyon received help from his Night Parade, who engaged in battle against the Kyoto Yokai, including Shokera, Kidomaru, Kyokotsu the father, Ibaraki Doji and the Great Tengu of Mount Kurama. Meanwhile, Koremitsu accompanied Hidemoto Keikain, the thirteen head of the Keikain Family, to Osaka Castle. Just as Nurarihyon struggled to defeat Hagoromo Gitsune and rescue Princess Yo, Nurarihyon ambitiously attempted to prove his love for Princess Yo by using Nenekirimaru to slash Hagoromo Gitsune. Hidemoto arrived in time to immobilize Hagoromo Gitsune, allowing Nurarihyon to exorcise her, not long before she promised to curse Nurarihyon's bloodline. After Nurarihyon told Hidemoto that he will create an atmosphere where humans and yōkai coexist, Princess Yo vowed to remain by Nurarihyon's side. Before taking his Night Parade back home, Nurarihyon shared a drink of sake with Hidemoto.
30	6	"The Legends of Tono"; Transliteration: "Tōno Monogatari" (Japanese: 遠野・物語)	August 9, 2011	January 28, 2014
In the present, Kyokotsu the daughter goes to Ryuenji Temple and devours the eyes of Gora Keikain, the onmyōji guardian of the sixth seal in Kyoto. It is revealed that Kyokotsu works for Hagoromo Gitsune, who appears in her present incarnation and now has gained the sixth liver as an offering. Yura returns to the Keikain Main House, where Ryuji assigns her as a substitute onmyōji guardian. Kiyotsugu Kiyojuji encourages Kana Ienaga, Natsumi Torii, Saori Maki and Jiro Shima to visit Yura in Kyoto. At sunset, Rikuo asks Nurarihyon if he can go to Kyoto, leading Nurarihyon to defeat Night Rikuo in a sparring match at nightfall. Two days later, Nurarihyon has no choice left but to send off Rikuo with the Namahage to the hidden Tono Village for training purposes since his current abilities are somewhat lacking. Once there, Night Rikuo meets Akagappa, leader of Tono Village. When Night Rikuo bails on doing laundry by the creek, he meets Itaku, assigned to be Night Rikuo's instructor. He also meets Tono Village members Amezo, Awashima, Reira, Yukari and Dohiko at an arena. Night Rikuo finally understands what Nurarihyon meant by "bringing fear", while Itaku prepares for a sparring match.
31	7	"Kyokasuigetsu"; Transliteration: "Kyōkasuigetsu" (Japanese: 鏡花水月)	August 16, 2011	January 28, 2014
Itaku uses his sickles in order to cut through Night Rikuo's fear. At an outdoor hot spring, Night Rikuo confesses that he wants to go to Kyoto in order to uphold yōkai chivalry. Meanwhile, Kidomaru arrives in Tono Village, requesting Akagappa to grant him twenty or thirty soldiers in order to fulfill Hagoromo Gitsune's goal of breaking the seals in Kyoto, but Akagappa refuses to help him. Before Kidomaru leaves, he spots Night Rikuo doing laundry by the creek. Kidomaru confronts Night Rikuo and recognizes him as Nurarihyon's grandson. Thanks to his training with the Itaku, Night Rikuo refines his fear to another level, understanding Nurarihyon's technique of Kyokasuigetsu, which personifies fantasy and illusions. Thanks to the effort of Itaku and Reira, Kidomaru retreats before saying that Kyoto will soon fall like the Keikain Family by the hands of Hagoromo Gitsune. Elsewhere, Kyoto Yokai member Minagoroshi Jizo explains that there are eight temples that contain seals linked to the streets of Kyoto taking the form of a spiral. Hagoromo Gitsune prepares to lead a full-scale invasion on the fifth seal in Seieji Temple.
32	8	"Hagoromo-Gitsune Kyoto Invasion"; Transliteration: "Hagoromo Gitsune Kyōto Zenmetsu Shinkō" (Japanese: 羽衣狐京都全滅侵攻)	August 23, 2011	January 28, 2014
Hagoromo Gitsune breaks the fifth seal at Seieji Temple after easily killing Haigo Keikain, the onmyōji guardian of the fifth seal. She then breaks the fourth seal at Nishihoganji Temple, where Kyoto Yokai member Gashadokuro, a large skeleton, was buried underneath. Meanwhile, Masatsugu Keikain, Pato Keikain and Akifusa Keikain, the onmyōji guardians of the third, second and first seals, proceed with their plan to take down Hagoromo Gitsune at Rokukinji Temple, home to the third seal. Akifusa, Pato and Masatsugu manage to imprison and immobilize Hagoromo Gitsune inside a golden spirit barrier, but Gashadokuro breaks the spirit barrier from the outside, allowing Hagoromo Gitsune to attack Akifusa, Pato and Masatsugu. In Tono Village, Night Rikuo hears from Awashima that the onmyōji guardians were defeated by Hagoromo Gitsune. After saying farewell to Akagappa, Night Rikuo asks Itaku, Amezo, Awashima, Reira, Yukari and Dohiko to join his Night Parade before heading out to the Nura House en route to Kyoto.
33	9	"The Grey Onmyoji"; Transliteration: "Haiiro no Onmyōji" (Japanese: 灰色の陰陽師)	August 30, 2011	January 28, 2014
Night Rikuo and the Tono Village friends arrive at the Nura House. Giving his blessing to Night Rikuo before he leaves, Nurarihyon lends the Treasure Ship, a strategic yōkai airbase. Meanwhile, the Kiyojuji Paranormal Patrol visit Kusaka Shrine, though Kiyotsugu and Shima wander off. When Kana encounters two Kyoto Yokai members, Yura comes to the rescue. As Tsurara and Aotabo reach Kusaka Shrine, Aotabo watches over Kana while Tsurara and Yura save Natsumi and Saori from two more Kyoto Yokai members. Yura then explains to the others that the third seal at Rokukinji Temple is broken and that the Kyoto Yokai could run rampant if the remaining two seals are broken. Yura goes to Sokokuji Temple, home to the second seal, in order to reinforce the spirit barrier. However, Masatsugu and Pato have been captured by the Kyoto Yokai, while Akifusa unexpectedly aids the Kyoto Yokai in attempting to destroy the spirit barrier. Yura is almost killed by Akifusa until Ryuji intervenes. As Ryuji deduces that a "grey onmyōji" brainwashed Akifusa, Yura runs off to find Mamiru.
34	10	"Hagun"; Transliteration: "Hagun" (Japanese: 破軍)	September 6, 2011	January 28, 2014
After an intense showdown, Ryuji learns that Akifusa has been possessed by Minagoroshi Jizo. Hagoromo Gitsune and the Kyoto Yokai arrive at the scene and appear to have Ryuji outmatched, that is until Yura and Mamiru also arrive. While Mamiru takes Ryuji to safety, Yura activates Hagun, which summons previous ancestors of the Keikain Family. Guided by the spirit of Hidemoto who is now a part of Hagun, Yura eventually purges Akifusa from being possessed. As Hagoromo Gitsune dispatches Ibaraki Doji and Shokera to attack, Yura activates the Fog of Confusion, which shrouds the onmyōji guardians and allows all of them to retreat from Hagoromo Gitsune. On the Treasure Ship, the Nura Clan members get acquainted with the Tono Village friends. Moreover, a conflict erupts between Kubinashi and Itaku over chain of command.
35	11	"Battle Above Kyoto"; Transliteration: "Kyō Jōkū no Tatakai" (Japanese: 京上空の戦い)	September 13, 2011	January 28, 2014
Hagoromo Gitsune breaks the second seal at Sokokuji Temple, where Tsuchigumo was buried underneath. With Tsuchigumo eager to fight someone strong enough, Kidomaru says that there is someone worthy. Kubinashi and Itaku continue to battle with string against sickles. Zen manages to intervene and restore order on the Treasure Ship. Suddenly, Kyoto Yokai member Hakuzozu interdicts the Treasure Ship and challenges Night Rikuo to a duel. Night Rikuo uses Kyokasuigetsu and manages to destroy Hakuzozu's spear Dakini with Nenekirimaru. Kubinashi recalls when Rihan once said that Rikuo must choose his life path for himself. When the defeated Hakuzozu asks to be beheaded, Night Rikuo spares Hakuzozu by whacking him on the head with the wooden stick Takimaru. Night Rikuo then recruits Hakuzozu into his Night Parade. However, Hakuzozu's minions begin attacking the Treasure Ship above the outskirts of Kyoto as dawn approaches.
36	12	"Long-Standing Wish"; Transliteration: "Shukugan" (Japanese: 宿願)	September 20, 2011	January 28, 2014
Dark whirlwinds are seen forming over the locations of the broken seals, whereas all yōkai surprisingly maintain their forms at daylight. With the Treasure Ship heavily damaged, Night Rikuo and his Night Parade make an emergency landing at the Kamo River. Although declining to join Night Rikuo, Hakuzozu advises him to go to Fushime Inari Shrine, home to the eighth seal. Yura and Hidemoto attend a general assembly for the onmyōji guardians at the Keikain Main House. It is explained that Hagoromo Gitsune plans to take over Nijo Castle, home to the first seal, and intends to give birth to her unborn child there within several weeks, a long-standing wish which first united the Kyoto Yokai. The only way to defeat Hagoromo Gitsune is to combine Yura's Hagun with Night Rikuo's Nenekirimaru. Tsurara interrupts the general assembly to inform Yura and Hidemoto that Night Rikuo is on his way. Night Rikuo and his Night Parade fight their way in the streets teeming with Kyoto Yokai members.
36.5	12.5	"The Destiny of the Demon Capital"; Transliteration: "Innen no Sennen Makyō" (Japanese: 因縁の千年魔京)	September 27, 2011	January 28, 2014
This is a recapitulation of episodes 25 through 36.
37	13	"Torii Labyrinth"; Transliteration: "Meikyū: Torii no Mori" (Japanese: 迷宮・鳥居の森)	October 4, 2011	January 28, 2014
Night Rikuo and his Night Parade split up into groups upon arriving at Fushime Inari Shrine. Kurotabo becomes suspicious when Awashima picks up a heavy stone near the entrance. Awashima spots a crying boy, only to be spirited away in an alternate realm, where Awashina is attacked by the countless arms of Kyoto Yokai member Nijunanamen Senju Mukade holding various weapons through numerous torii scattered around the landscape. Given a glimmer of hope when Kurotabo pierces through the alternate realm, Awashima activates Dance of the Battle Maiden in order to slice Nijunanamen Senju Mukade in half, but to no avail. Amezo once said that some yōkai who appear to be invincible in their own territories can be defeated if their source of power is destroyed. Following this sound advice, Awashima activates the Complete Maternity, Izanami, in order to save the crying boy and destroy Nijunanamen Senju Mukade's source of power before activating the Complete Paternity, Izunagi, in order to defeat Nijunanamen Senju Mukade and escape from the alternate realm. Arriving with Ryuji, Mamiru, Tsurara and Yura, Hidemoto tells Night Rikuo about the ultimate plan to defeat Hagoromo Gitsune.
38	14	"An Ayakashi to Avoid"; Transliteration: "Zettai ni Sōgū Shite wa Naranai Ayakashi" (Japanese: 絶対に遭遇してはならない妖)	October 11, 2011	May 20, 2014
Tsuchigumo suddenly arrives at Fushime Inari Shrine challenging any foe worthy to fight him. Meanwhile, Hagoromo Gitsune finally arrives at Nijo Castle. Hidemoto discreetly informs Yura that Tsuchigumo must be avoided due to his extreme hunger. Tsuchigumo proves to be unbeatable against Night Rikuo and his Night Parade. Night Rikuo continues to fight even when daybreak causes him to gradually revert to his human form. Impressed by Rikuo's tenacity, Tsuchigumo takes an unconscious Tsurara as a hostage and retreats to Sokokuji Temple. Inside Nijo Castle, Hagoromo Gitsune enters the black lake Nuegaike, where she will give birth to her unborn child Nue. Hagoromo Gitsune orders Ibaraki Doji and Shokera to gather more human livers. As Zen and Kejoro start to worry about Rikuo, Gyuki requests to train Rikuo in a secluded shrine after he recovers.
39	15	"Descent Into Darkness..."; Transliteration: "Yami ni Shizumu..." (Japanese: 闇に沈む...)	October 18, 2011	May 20, 2014
While Hagoromo Gitsune breaks the first seal and consumes human livers in preparation for her childbirth at Nijo Castle, Kejoro tries to raise the morale of Rikuo's Night Parade at Fushime Inari Shrine. The Great Tengu of Mount Kurama is seen assisting Gyuki during Rikuo's training to become stronger. Kubinashi goes rogue, disillusioned by the recent events. Kejoro witnesses Kubinashi in the streets when he saves a woman by slaughtering Kyoto Yokai members called the Mukurowaguruma Gang. At Hashira Villa, home to the seventh seal, Kurotabo realizes that Kubinashi slaughtered the Kyoto Yokai members there. Kejoro then witnesses Kubinashi at Ryuenji Temple when he saves schoolchildren by slaughtering Kyoto Yokai members called the Onmoraki. However, Kubinashi and Kejoro are soon bombarded by Ibaraki Doji. Shokera appears outside the Keikain Main House and penetrates the spirit barrier created by the onmyōji guardians. Still in a weak state, Akifusa prepares to duel Shokera.
40	16	"Shared Past"; Transliteration: "Futari no Kako" (Japanese: 二人の過去)	October 25, 2011	May 20, 2014
Tsuchigumo has Tsurara in captivity at Sokokuji Temple, but Kidomaru takes his leave. Roused to protect the Kiyojuji Paranormal Patrol inside the Keikain Main House, Aotabo goes outside to relieve Akifusa and fight Shokera. Kubinashi and Kejoro fare well together against Ibaraki Doji at Ryuenji Temple. A flashback reveals that Kejoro always had Kubinashi's back even when Rihan was alive. Both Shokera and Ibaraki Doji unleash their full power. Kidomaru suddenly arrives at Ryuenji Temple and stacks the odds against Kubinashi and Kejoro. When Aotabo is overwhelmed by Shokera, the former gains the will to defeat the latter and prevents Kana, Natsumi and Saori from being captured. Yura and Hidemoto suddenly arrive to reseal Ryuenji Temple, having shared that they already resealed Fushime Inari Shrine and Hashira Villa.
41	17	"Equipping a Hundred Demons"; Transliteration: "Hyakki Matou Miwaza" (Japanese: 百鬼纏う御業)	November 1, 2011	May 20, 2014
Kidomaru prepares to capture Yura, but Ryuji, Mamiru and Kurotabo intercept. Kappa transports Yura, Kubinashi and Kejoro to the Keikain Main House. After a rough training session with Gyuki and the Great Tengu of Mount Kurama in the woods, Rikuo is treated by Zen, who says that there is a fighting technique separate from invocation and possession. Yura is distraught and exhausted upon seeing the aftermath of Shokera's attack on the Keikain Main House. At night, Gyuki learns that the Great Tengu of Mount Kurama was a former Kyoto Yokai member who was usurped by Minagoroshi Jizo rewriting the memories of the other Kyoto Yokai members. Meanwhile, Night Rikuo, Zen, Gozumaru and Mezumaru are attacked by Kyoto Yokai members called the Kurama Tengu. Mezumaru carries an injured Gozumaru to safety, though Night Rikuo eventually allows Zen to fight despite his weak constitution. Gyuki notes that Night Rikuo must accept his human side which would allow himself to master Equip, a hidden fighting technique.
42	18	"Entrust It All to Me"; Transliteration: "Zenbu Azukero" (Japanese: 全部あずけろ)	November 8, 2011	May 20, 2014
Night Rikuo activates Equip to transfer Zen's fear into Nenekirimaru and uses Poison Wings to defeat the Kurama Tengu. Night Rikuo starts to rally his Night Parade. Minagoroshi Jizo hears word that Seieji Temple, Nishihoganji Temple and Rokukinji Temple are now resealed. Unable to escape from Tsuchigumo at Sokokuji Temple, Tsurara attempts to commit hara-kiri, but Night Rikuo and his Night Parade arrive in the nick of time. Night Rikuo orders Tsurara to entrust him, by which Night Rikuo activates Equip to transfer Tsurara's fear into Nenekirimaru and uses Pink Blossoms Under the Snow to shatter one of Tsuchigumo's four arms. However, an unfazed Tsuchigumo creates a large boxing ring with his Spider Web and repeatedly attacks Night Rikuo, who somehow manages to avoid from being mauled. Tsurara and Zen leap into the boxing ring in order to aid Night Rikuo. Itaku, Amezo and Awashima also arrive to help.
43	19	"A Bond of Trust"; Transliteration: "Senaka-goshi no Kizuna" (Japanese: 背中越しの絆)	November 15, 2011	May 20, 2014
While Amezo and Awashima fends off Tsuchigumo, Tsurara chooses to back out after realizing that her bond with Night Rikuo was not special. Night Rikuo activates Equip to transfer Itaku's fear into Nenekirimaru and uses Indigo Aster Scythe to slice Tsuchigumo in half. Yura and Hidemoto arrive in the boxing ring just as Tsuchigumo gathers his strength in order to challenge Nue, who was both a human and a yōkai in the past. Hagoromo Gitsume prepares for her childbirth in Nuegaike at Nijo Castle, but Nurarihyon appears and questions whether she was one who murdered Rihan. Nurarihyon is attacked by Ibaraki Doji and Kyokotsu. After being surrounded by Kidomaru and Gashadokuro, Nurarihyon is rescued by Karasu Tengu, but they are soon blinded with black feathers by Yosuzume and stabbed with the Devil's Blade by Minagoroshi Jizo. As Nurarihyon and Karasu Tengu manage to escape into the moat, Kidomaru informs Minagoroshi Jizo that Hagoromo Gitsune has entered labor. At the same time, Night Rikuo and his Night Parade arrive at Horikawa River Street, the road that leads to Nijo Castle.
44	20	"The Cycle of Rebirth"; Transliteration: "Rin'ne no Wa" (Japanese: 輪廻の環)	November 22, 2011	May 20, 2014
After easily slaying Kyoto Yokai gatekeepers Gaijiro and Gaitaro on his own, Night Rikuo eventually slays Kyoto Yokai guards Satori and Oni Hitokuchi with Yura's assistance. When Night Rikuo and his Night Parade storm Nijo Castle, they encounter Kidomaru. Meanwhile, Hagoromo Gitsune goes into labor in Nuegaike. Analogizing that the Edo Yokai are like fireworks while the Kyoto Yokai are like hellfire, Kidomaru summons an alternate space called Rajomon Gate, trapping Night Rikuo and his Night Parade inside. Kidomaru uses Plum Tree against Night Rikuo, but Kurotabo blocks the attack with his Dance of the Black Weapons. Kurotabo explains to Night Rikuo that there is more than one variation of Equip, which is the strike method and the meld method. As Kubinashi then restrains Ibaraki Doji, Kidomaru uses Cherry Blossoms against Night Rikuo, but Kurotabo blocks the attack again. When Kidomaru uses Oblivion, Night Rikuo activates Equip to transfer Kurotabo's fear into Nenekirimaru and uses Dance of the Black Weapons to fight back.
45	21	"Birth"; Transliteration: "Tanjō" (Japanese: 誕生)	November 29, 2011	May 20, 2014
Revealed as an onmyōji 1,000 years ago during the Heian period, Abe no Seimei will be reincarnated as Nue. Night Rikuo defeats Kidomaru when the latter uses Slash Infinite as a last resort. Time runs out when Hagoromo Gitsume finally gives birth to Nue. When Hagoromo Gitsume orders the Kyoto Yokai to protect Nue in his vulnerable state, Ryuji and Mamiru distract Hagoromo Gitsume atop Nijo Castle. Yura and Hidemoto attempt to seal Nue in his chrysalis, but Tsuchigumo interferes due to his desire to fight Nue. After rescuing an injured Ryuji, Night Rikuo duels with Hagoromo Gitsune, realizing that she killed Rihan long ago. Hagoromo Gitsune attacks with her Fan of Two Tails, while Night Rikuo counterattacks with his Dance of the Black Weapons. Kubinashi and Itaku fight Ibaraki Doji, while Awashina helps Tsurara and Shōei battle Kyokotsu and Gashadokuro. When Kappa and Amezo try to fend off other Kyoto Yokai members, the Sanba Garasu arrive and find Nurarihyon and Karasu Tengu hiding in the moat now with restored eyesight. Night Rikuo dodges Hagoromo Gitsune when she attacks with her Sword of Three Tails. Tsuchigumo is concerned when he sees Minagoroshi Jizo holding the Devil's Blade.
46	22	"Fragments of the Past"; Transliteration: "Tsuioku no Kakera" (Japanese: 追憶の欠片)	December 6, 2011	May 20, 2014
Minagoroshi Jizo distracts Tsuchigumo, who is soon blinded by Yosuzume's black feathers. Itaku and Awashima are relieved thanks to Kejoro, Jami and Aotabo. Hagoromo Gitsume pins down Night Rikuo with her Spear of Four Tails, but fragments of her past memories come to haunt her. Kubinashi and Kejoro defeat Ibaraki Doji, while Aotabo and Jami defeat Gashadokuro and Kyokotsu. Nue finally comes out of his cocoon as a reborn Seimei. With help from Ryuji and Mamiru, the combined power of Yura's Hagun and Night Rikuo's Nenekirimaru forces Hagoromo Gitsume's spirit out of her host. Hagoromo Gitsune finally realizes that Minagoroshi Jizo and Nue manipulated the events around her. Nue betrays Hagoromo Gitsune and banishes her to Hell, despite her doing everything to ensure his reincarnation. With his eyesight now restored, Tsuchigumo challenges Nue to a fight.
47	23	"Banquet of Darkness"; Transliteration: "Ankoku no Utage" (Japanese: 暗黒の宴)	December 13, 2011	May 20, 2014
Nue effortlessly defeats Tsuchigumo and banishes him to Hell. After handing over the Devil's Blade to Nue, Minagoroshi Jizo is recognized as the left eye of Sanmoto Gorozaemon, who was previously destroyed by Rihan. However, Night Rikuo stabs Minagoroshi Jizo for being behind Rihan's murder. Nue easily shatters Nenekirimaru when Night Rikuo charges at him. After rescuing Night Rikuo, Nurarihyon orders Gyuki, Hitotsume Nyudo, Mokugyo Daruma and the Great Tengu of Mount Kurama to stall Nue. Hagoromo Gitsune's host is revealed to be a yōkai named Yamabuki Otome, Rihan's first wife who left Rihan because she was barren. Otome reveals that Seimei and Sanmoto used Soul Rebirth on her eight years ago in order to plant false memories within her, in which she was taken in by Rihan as his daughter and soon murdered him near the Japanese roses. Nue claims that he stands in the pinnacle of darkness. Night Rikuo and his Night Parade band together against Nue, but Nue remains unharmed due to their haphazard attacks.
48	24	"Rikuo's Declaration"; Transliteration: "Rikuo, Sengensu" (Japanese: リクオ、宣言す)	December 20, 2011	May 20, 2014
Night Rikuo activates Equip to transfer the combined fear of his Night Parade in a powerful attack. As his body starts to deteriorate, Nue realizes that his body has not fully adapted to the human world. Promising to settle the score when he returns, Nue retreats to Hell, taking Kidomaru and Ibaraki Doji with him. Otome passes away after seeing Night Rikuo as the splitting image of Rihan. With the skies no longer shrouded in darkness, Kyokotsu and Gashadokuro leave with Otome's corpse in tow, hoping that Hagoromo Gitsune will return someday. As the Nura Clan visits the Keikain Main House, Hidemoto tells Nurarihyon that Nue might return within a year. Rikuo requests Akifusa to forge a new spirit blade that would surpass Nenekirimaru. The Kiyojuji Paranormal Patrol also drops by the Keikain Main House. After having a dream of sparring with Rihan and Nurarihyon, Rikuo wakes up to attend a general assembly at the Nura House. Nurarihyon informs the yōkai council members that an all-out war will be waged against Nue and his minions. Night Rikuo then gives a declaration, saying that he will not tolerate his Night Parade harming humans or breaking the code of honor.
48.5	24.5	"The Fate of the Demon Capital"; Transliteration: "Kenkon no Sennen Makyō" (Japanese: 乾坤の千年魔京)	December 27, 2011	May 20, 2014
This is a recapitulation of episodes 37 through 48.
