= List of Nura: Rise of the Yokai Clan characters =

Characters that appear in the manga Nura: Rise of the Yokai Clan include humans, yōkai and various other factions. Among them is the Nura household of the Nura Clan, which houses the yōkai who follow Nurarihyon, the master of all yōkai.

== Nura Clan ==
The biggest yōkai faction in eastern Japan. They use the character for "Fear" as their symbol and rule over the Kanto area. Shiibashi describes them as a yakuza of yōkai clan, with Nurarihyon as their leader. There are about ten thousand yōkai who are considered members of the Nura Clan, but the clan itself has been in decline since the death of the Second Head Rihan Nura, Nurarihyon's son and Rikuo's father.

=== Main characters ===
Rikuo Nura (奴良 リクオ, Nura Rikuo)
Teen Rikuo Voiced by: Jun Fukuyama (Japanese); Darrel Guilbeau (human), Grant George (yōkai) (English)
Child Rikuo Voiced by: Eri Kitamura (Japanese); Michelle Ruff (English)
Rikuo is the third and current head of the Nura Clan. He is the son of Rihan and Wakana Nura, and grandson of Nurarihyon. Although he appears to be an average 13-year-old, he is already 1/4 yōkai, and is destined to take over the title of Master of all yōkai from his grandfather, though the main conflict for the first portion of the series lies in his rejection of the idea.
As a child, Rikuo respected and looked up to yōkai, playing pranks on members of the Nura house and often declaring he would become more yōkai-like and take over as the Third Head. However, after a discussion at school, he came to realize the evil nature of yōkai deeds and decided to set himself firmly on the path of living a strictly human life. Since then, he has attempted to become more like a normal human by doing all sorts of good deeds. Even though he appreciates all that his yōkai underlings do for him, he is nevertheless desperate to prevent his school friends from learning of his connection to yōkai. Despite this, in times of impending danger, his yōkai blood awakens and he changes into his yōkai form. He is later able to transform at will, provided that it is nighttime or he is in the dark and reverts to normal in sunlight (specifically, since he only has one fourth of yōkai blood in him, he can only keep his yōkai form for six hours – one fourth of a day). After being tested by Gyuki, Rikuo he decides to accept the position of the Third Head and save both humans and yōkai.
In contrast to his yōkai form, which is confident, strong and inspires "Fear" among his allies, leading many of them to join him, the human Rikuo is seemingly weak but very clever. He is easily able to manipulate one of the council members into isolating himself during a meeting and rationalize against the dissolving of the Gyuki Clan. Though originally he had no recollection of changing to his yōkai form, by the time he faced Gyuki, he admitted to pretending to have no recollection to distance himself from the world of yōkai. Later, he is shown interacting and communicating with his yōkai form. Together they plan to form a Hyakki Yakō of their own. He decides to leave the human side of things to his human form and handle the yōkai-side of things as his yōkai self.
After losing to his grandfather, he is taken to the yōkai village of Tono to train. There, he learns how to use his Fear against other yōkai. He departs for Kyoto to face Hagoromo Gitsune in order to save Yura and avenge his father. After losing to Tsuchigumo, he undergoes three days of training with Gyuki. It is during this training that he first learns how to use the technique of Matoi with Zen. Finally having accepted that he is both human and yōkai, Rikuo becomes even more powerful.
Rikuo's primary weapon is the spirit blade Nenekirimaru, which was designed to only harm yōkai. However, the blade broke when he tried to hurt Abe no Seimei. Rikuo has since asked a member of the Keikain House to create a more powerful blade for him and it is currently being forged. For the time being, Rikuo uses the tree branch he used to defeat both of Kidomaru's yōkai bodyguards when they attacked him at the Tono Village.
Tsurara Oikawa (及川 氷麗, Oikawa Tsurara)
Voiced by: Yui Horie (Japanese); Cassandra Lee (English)
Tsurara is a Yuki Onna who is Rikuo's trusted attendant and part of Rikuo's new "Hyakki Yakō" who follows him to school disguised as Tsurara Oikawa. She is affectionate towards Rikuo and is jealous when other girls pay him attention. Other members of the Nura household believe the situation would become worse if Tsurara were to see what other females did to Rikuo. She is overprotective of Rikuo when he is his "day" or human form and expresses great concern for his well being, which is the reason why she is always around him at school (which causes misunderstandings and concern on Kana's part). She also acts as a cook and, though her food is delicious, most of the time it is chilled or cold. Prior to Rikuo awakening for the first time, she was "easy pickings" for his pranks. She also admires Rikuo's yōkai form because she finds him very reliable and magnificent. Tsurara is the daughter of Setsura, who was attracted to Nurarihyon in his prime; Tsurara seems to have inherited her mother's trait for falling for the Supreme Commanders of the Nura Clan. She is oblivious to the fact Shima has a crush on her.
She also has a fear of Yura as she is an onmyōji and a rivalry with Kana (going so far as to nearly freeze her). However she protects Kana as her death would sadden Rikuo. Tsurara is confident that she'll eventually win Rikuo's heart since they both have yōkai lifespans. She goes to Kyoto to protect the Investigation group along with Aotabo. Later, she rejoins Rikuo but is kidnapped by Tsuchigumo. She is later freed by Rikuo and performs Matoi with him, becoming the second of his subordinates to do so. After the defeat of Hagoromo Gitsune, and Abe no Seimei's departure from Kyoto, Tsurara returns to the Nura house. When Rikuo becomes the new head of the Nura Clan, Tsurara is "promoted" into the elite class of the family, becoming one of the clan's new sub commanders under Rikuo. As a result of her new position, she is given command over one of the clan's territories (which was under her mother's supervision) and is currently working to build up her own "clan" and gain subordinates in order to strength Rikuo's Hyakki Yakō. The Tsurara Clan currently consists of 20 demons that appear from bowls for shaved ice and the yōkai who served under her mother.
In an omake where her mother demands that she take the lips of the third heir, she is stuck with Rikuo in a confined space after an accident in the storage room and is apparently almost kissed by him before being interrupted by Aotabo barging in to rescue them. Tsurara is left thinking there is hope for a chance of Rikuo loving her.
Yura Keikain (花開院 ゆら, Keikain Yura)
Voiced by: Ai Maeda (Japanese); Michelle Ruff (English)
An onmyōji of the Keikain House who specializes in shikigami, she can control four of them at the same time which impresses even Nurarihyon. She was trained by Akifusa and raised to see yōkai as evil, and seeks to complete her training by defeating Nurarihyon and then inheriting the household. When her brother reveals Rikuo to be a yōkai and Nurarihyon's grandson, she says she can accept it if it's him. She has returned to Kyoto to deal with Hagoromo Gitsune and has currently retreated to the Keikain main house.
She fights against yōkai using shikigami; Rokuson the deer, Bukyoku the samurai, Tanro the white wolf and Rentei the koi fish, which she merges with it to form a holy-water cannon. Recently she has also added Kyomon, the elephant, to her arsenal. She is also the only member of the Keikain house who can summon and use "Hagun" to increase her own powers, and is the first since Hidemoto to be able to do so. It is because of this ability that Yura has been designated as the heir and future head of Keikain House. This also implies that after she dies, Yura will become part of Hagun, like Hidemoto did.
Kana Ienaga (家長 カナ, Ienaga Kana)
Voiced by: Aya Hirano (Japanese); Mela Lee (English)
Kana is Rikuo's childhood friend and neighbor. She first appears in the original Nurarihyon no Mago One-Shot as Yura Usami and says she hates things relating to yōkai and spirit mediums. Kana appears to be somewhat a magnet for drawing in yokai as they usually come after her. She is hinted to have some affection for Rikuo, as she gets jealous on seeing Rikuo and Tsurara together. Rikuo made a promise to help her if she is ever in need. After being kidnapped by a yōkai on her 13th birthday, she was saved by "Night" Rikuo and was taken to a yōkai party. The next morning Kana asked Rikuo if he was friends with his yōkai form and blushed when Rikuo asked why. It is evident that she has fallen for "Night" Rikuo to the point that she blushes whenever she thinks of him. However, it is also hinted that she is starting to like Rikuo as she is much concerned and distracted when Tsurara is close to him. After learning that Rikuo and his yōkai form are one and the same entity, Kana's affections are no longer divided. She decided choose accepting them instead denying this revelations. This is also resulting her feeling toward Rikuo is now grow stronger than before.

=== Main house ===
The main house for the Nura Clan, located in Ukiyoe Town. It is a large, old-style Japanese mansion which is home to Rikuo, Rihan, Wakana, Nurarihyon and much of the members of the main house. It also serves as a meeting place for the heads of the yōkai clans under the Nura banner.

Nurarihyon (ぬらりひょん, Nurarihyon)
Elderly Nurarihyon Voiced by: Chikao Ōtsuka (Japanese); William Frederick Knight (English)
Young Nurarihyon Voiced by: Kōji Yusa (Japanese); Keith Silverstein (English)
Nurarihyon is Rihan's father and Rikuo's grandfather. He is the Supreme Commander of the Nura Clan. It is said that he plays pranks on humans, but he doesn't really hate them – rather, he doesn't believe humans should interfere in yōkai affairs. He dislikes the fact that Rikuo goes to school and acts human but respects his grandson's wishes.
400 years ago, he fell in love with Yohime and fought Hagoromo Gitsune in Kyoto when she kidnapped Yohime just to eat her liver. At first things looked grim for Nurarihyon, but he was eventually able to harm Hagoromo Gitsune's host body and save Yohime when Hagoromo Gitsune fled. They then clashed a second time on the roof, fighting to a stalemate. The arrival of Hidemoto Keikain tipped the balance in Nurarihyon's favor. Hagoromo Gitsune was sealed away by Hidemoto but the damage she caused to Nurarihyon during their battle caused Nurarihyon's life span to decrease.
Even in his old age, he can easily beat "Night" Rikuo and Muchi. Normal yōkai feel so much "Fear" that he is invisible to them until he strikes, that is his "Shin Meikyō Shisui". He appears during the final battle with Hagoromo Gitsune in Kyoto and assists Rikuo. After returning from Kyoto, Nurarihyon officially retires as leader and commander of the Nura Clan, allowing his grandson Rikuo to succeed him.
Rihan Nura (奴良 鯉伴, Nura Rihan)
Voiced by: Keiji Fujiwara (Japanese); Matt Mercer (English)
Rihan is Nurarihyon's son and Rikuo's father. He was a half yōkai and the Second Head of the Nura Clan. The Nura Clan's power reached its peak under his leadership, mostly because of his first wife, Yamabuki Otome encouraging him. Like Rikuo, Rihan had a choice when he was younger to either embrace his human side or his yōkai side. He chose to embrace his yōkai side which allowed him to use his yōkai powers at all times. However, he didn't want Rikuo to know about the yakuza aspect of the yōkai world and raised his son in such a way as to prevent him from learning of it.
It is revealed that before he married Wakana, Rihan fell in love and married Yamabuki Otome, a beautiful ayakashi. As a result of Hagoromo Gitsune's curse on Nurarihyon (that his yōkai bloodline would die out), they couldn't have children. Blaming herself, Yamabuki Otome eventually left Rihan a poem describing her pain of not being able to bear him children and she disappeared and, presumably, died. In a scheme to get rid of Rihan and to revive Hagoromo Gitsune, Abe no Seimei and Sanmoto Gorozaemon revived Yamabuki Otome as her younger self and Hagoromo Gitsune possessed the body. Since her form resembled his late first wife, Rihan believed her to be Yamabuki Otome's daughter and treated her as if she were his own. When Rihan recited Yamabuki Otome's farewell poem, Hagoromo Gitsune stabbed him through the chest, with young Rikuo witnessing his father's death.
Yohime (珱姫, Yōhime)
Voiced by: Hōko Kuwashima (Japanese); Cristina Vee (English)
Yohime was a noblewoman who lived 400 years ago. She had the ability to heal illnesses and injuries. Her father took advantage of this ability by charging exorbitant fees for her healing services, thus alienating himself from the local peasants who were unable to pay. Yohime herself was kind but sheltered and only saw the outside world after meeting Nurarihyon, who spirited her away from her family's home to give her a taste of the real world. Because of her ability, and the yōkai belief that eating the liver of an extraordinary human increases their own power, she was kidnapped by Hagoromo Gitsune. Nurarihyon rescued her after a grueling battle and asked her to marry him, which she agreed to. As Nurarihyon's wife, she have birth to Rihan and constantly worried about her husband getting involved in unnecessary fights. Unfortunately, due to her human life span, she never got to meet her grandson. However, she seems aware of Rikuo even in the afterlife; her spirit revived Nurarihyon when he was near death, telling him that he still had a child to look after.
Wakana Nura (奴良 若菜, Nura Wakana)
Voiced by: Risa Mizuno (Japanese); Erika Harlacher (English)
Wakana is Rikuo's mother and Rihan's second wife. She is 30 years old, meaning she gave birth to Rikuo at age 18. She is human, but lives in the Nura mansion and gets along with the yōkai who also live there. According to Kubinashi, she made Rihan smile constantly, thus changing his character. Wakana is slightly absent-minded, often vaguely mentioning the existence of Yokai when Rikuo's friends visit. During the Hundred Tales Clan's attack, Wakana was revealed to keep a gun hidden on her person. In the questions and answers section, Wakana says that Night Rikuo never talks to her because he's so taciturn.
Setsura (雪麗, Setsura)
Voiced by: Yui Horie (Japanese); Cassandra Lee (English)
Setsura is a Yuki Onna who was part of Nurarihyon's Hyakki Yakō 400 years ago. Her solution to things she didn't like was to freeze them. She is Tsurara's mother and had an unrequited love for Nurarihyon, which resulted in her greatly disliking his wife Yohime. She resembles her daughter, only she has red, rather than yellow, eyes. During Nurarihyon's battle with Hagoromo Gitsune 400 years ago, she fought against Ibaraki Doji and was nearly beaten to death by him. Afterwards she helped to raise Rihan, and he saw her as an older sister. In an omake, Nurarihyon worried that she might kill infant Rihan if he let her look after him. Setsura showed great concern for Rihan, even sending Hihi and Hitosume to check on him during the battle with Sanmoto. She also implied that Rihan was either a terrible cook or had bad taste as she wondered if it was something Yamabuki Otome ate that made her unconscious. In the present, Setsura encourages her daughter Tsurara to steal a kiss from Rikuo as this would fulfill her love for Nurarihyon if only by proxy.
Aotabo (青田坊, Aotabō)
Voiced by: Hiroki Yasumoto (Japanese); Kyle Hebert (English)
The degenerate priest who wears the iron blue robe and is the strongest yōkai in the Nura house. He used to be a monk who had killed many warriors. He has fists that can crush rock and palms that can fit a person's head. He was enlightened by a holy man, leading to him protecting children. The holy man once stated it is up to him whether he became a human again or a raging god. He almost became a human but chose the path of a raging god by killing a group of people who were torturing the children he had wished to protect. He has a skull necklace that limits his strength so that he doesn't cause damage unintentionally. At full potential, his is so strong that he was able to kill Shokera, a head of the Kyoto Yokai, in one strike. He is also the leader of a biker gang called the Blood Night Hyakki Yakō, which was an accident on his part because he was trying to protect Rikuo. He is often seen with Kurotabo and the two are known as the assault officers of the Nura Clan. As a member of Rikuo's new "Hyakki Yakō", he goes Kyoto along with Tsurara and disguised as Kurata in order to protect Rikuo's classmates. After Rikuo becomes head of the Nura Clan, Aotabo is promoted into the elite class of the family and becomes one of the Rikuo's territorial commanders.
Kurotabo (黒田坊, Kurotabō)
Voiced by: Kōsuke Toriumi (Japanese); Ben Pronsky (English)
The Assassin and Destruction Monk and Master of the hidden blade, he is often seen with Aotabo, and the two are known as the assault officers of the Nura House. He is a demon created by children as their protector; except for two horns on his head that are normally hidden by his hat, Kuro could pass as a human: in his human form he even dresses as a businessman. Kurotabo saved Natsumi from her curse as repayment for her helping him. As part of Rikuo's new "Hyakki Yakō", he travels with him to Kyoto. He helps Ryuji and Mamiru fight Ibaraki Doji and later teaches Rikuo the second form of Matoi. After Rikuo becomes head of the Nura Clan, Kurotabo is promoted into the elite class of the family and becomes one of Rikuo's territorial commanders. Later, Kurotabo again saves Natsumi from a yōkai that had her trapped in a subway. During that incident, it is revealed that he had once been the supreme general of the Hundred Tales Clan, before joining the Nura Clan under Rihan. He had been manipulated by Sanmoto Gorozaemon but was able to regain his senses and defeated Sanmoto Gorozaemon by performing Matoi with Rihan.
Kubinashi (首無, Kubinashi)
Voiced by: Takahiro Sakurai (Japanese); Todd Haberkorn (English)
As his name would imply, Kubinashi's head floats above his shoulders and he has no neck. He is one of Rikuo's yōkai guardians and frequently takes care of the laundry at the Nura mansion. He fights using red string (which is made from Kejoro's hair and Jurogumo thread) that entangles the target the more it struggles, and which can become as strong as chains when he imbues it with his "Fear". When he was alive, he and a friend were toyed with and killed by yōkai. Prior to this, he had been a bandit who sought to bring justice to the world, doing whatever he saw fit to help others. As a result, he became a yōkai himself in order to exact his revenge by killing any yōkai he came across and was known as "The String Assassin of Hitachi Province". He was defeated by Rihan Nura, who originally intended to kill him, but Kejoro interceded for him and he ended up joining Rihan's Hyakki Yakō.
In Kyoto, after the Nura Clan's forces are devastated by Tsuchigumo, Kubinashi goes back to his old murderous ways and becomes determined to single-handed take down the Kyoto Yokai and ultimately Hagoromo Gitsune herself. He is confronted by Ibaraki Doji at the 6th seal of Ryuenji and is nearly killed trying to fight alone. Kejoro literally knocks sense into him and they battle Ibaraki Doji together with slightly more success. Ultimately, however, they are rescued by Kappa and Yura when things take a turn for the worse. After Rikuo becomes head of the Nura Clan, Kubinashi is promoted into the elite class of the family and becomes one of Rikuo's territorial commanders.
In the anime, Kubinashi's haori changes colors between seasons, being light blue in the first season and dark green-blue in the second season.
Kejoro (毛倡妓, Kejōrō)
Voiced by: Yumi Kakazu (Japanese); Wendee Lee (English)
Kejoro is a beautiful and curvaceous yōkai who uses her hair to fight. She serves as one of Rikuo's guardians and most frequently handles kitchen duties around the Nura mansion. The members of the Kiyojuji Paranormal Patrol frequently mistake her as Rikuo's older sister or a housekeeper. When Rikuo was beaten at the first seal in Kyoto and went to recover and train, she kept the Hyakki Yakō motivated with the idea of not being a disappointment to him when he returned. She has a history with Kubinashi, and had previously traveled together with him. She even offered her life to save him when he lost to Rihan Nura. She is also closest to Kubinashi out of all the yōkai in the series, and they are used to fighting as a team. She was once known as Kino, having known Kubinashi since she was a human child; her technique name suggests she became a courtesan as an adult. During the Kyoto attack, she is almost killed by Kidomaru but is saved by Kappa and Yura. After Rikuo becomes head of the Nura Clan, Kejoro is promoted into the elite class of the family and becomes one of Rikuo's territorial commanders.
Kappa (河童, Kappa)
Voiced by: Masahito Yabe (Japanese); Bryce Papenbrook (English)
A kappa yōkai in the Nura Clan whose "Fear" is water and one of Rikuo's yōkai guardians; he loves cucumbers. He fights extremely well near water and fights in a ninja suit. As part of Rikuo's new "Hyakki Yakō", he travels to Kyoto. He, along with Yura, appears in time to save Kubinashi and Kejoro. According to the questions asked in the Volumes, the white structure on Kappa's head is a bowl.
Natto Kozou (納豆小僧, Nattō Kozōu)
Voiced by: Satomi Arai, Etsuko Kozakura (episodes 9-20) (Japanese); Wendee Lee (English)
One of the yōkai who live in Nura House. As his name implies, his head is in the form of a natto and smells like one. Some yōkai seem to find this unpleasant. He's not very useful for combat purposes, and because of such is usually only good at reconnaissance.
Karasu Tengu (鴉天狗, Karasu Tengu)
Voiced by: Junji Majima (Japanese); Spike Spencer (English)
A yōkai of the Mount Takao Tengu Party. He is one of Nurarihyon's loyal advisers, often serving as a messenger. He appears as a small crow-styled tengu and is strong enough to fly while carrying an 8-year-old Rikuo. 400 years ago, during Nurarihyon's prime, Karasu Tengu appeared as a much larger anthropomorphic crow and fought on the front lines. The Sanba Garasu are his children. His wife takes care of matters in his home territory and she usually beats him whenever he returns home: Karasu believes he's gotten increasingly shorter from each beating. When Rihan led the clan as Second Heir, Karasu was already small.
Nuregarasu (濡鴉, Nuregarasu)
Voiced by: Yukari Tamura (OVA)
The wife of Karasu Tengu. Due to the absence on her husband and eldest children, who work for and live at the Main House, she is left in charge of their territory, She also has another set of triplet children, who are currently infants.
Sanba Garasu (三羽鴉, Sanba Garasu)
The Sanba Garasu are a trio of Tengu yōkai siblings; they are children of Karasu Tengu and Nuregarasu. They serve as spies or sentinels and report to their father, Karasu Tengu, regularly. They are also known to act of their own accord if Rikuo or the Nura Clan is in danger. Each of them has two forms: that of an anthropomorphic crow and that of a winged human. Despite numbering a girl among them, Karasu-Tengu always calls them his "fool-hardy sons".
Kuromaru (黒羽丸, Kuromaru)
Voiced by: Hiro Shimono (Japanese); Doug Erholtz (English)
Kuromaru seems to be the leader of the Sanba Garasu. He wears samurai-like warrior armor. According to "Night" Rikuo, Kuromaru takes his job way too seriously.
Tosakamaru (トサカ丸, Tosakamaru)
Voiced by: Miyu Irino (Japanese); Todd Stone (English)
Tosakamaru is the blond-haired Tengu with a mohawk. He respects his brother and always does as he's told but unlike Kuromaru, Tosakamaru doesn't take his job as seriously.
Sasami (ささ美, Sasami)
Voiced by: Ami Koshimizu (Japanese); Julie Ann Taylor (English)
Sasami is the long-haired Tengu who wears glasses. She is the only female of the Sanba Garasu. She was disgusted by Mezumaru for attacking the women's baths. She wields a pair of short whips as weapons. In an omake, she learns that there's a bird-related meal with the same name as her and she pummels her father, demanding to know why he named her that.
Jami (邪魅, Jami)
Voiced by: Yū Asakawa
Once a loyal samurai who was imprisoned by his lord's wife out of jealousy, he died when the prison flooded. Even in death, he thought only of his lord's safety, and become a yōkai to continue protecting his master and his descendants. In the present day, the latest descendant believes that Jami is haunting her out of revenge for his death and she invited the Kyojoji Paranormal Patrol to investigate. When Night Rikuo arrives, Jami believes him to be an enemy, but learns that he has come to clear up the confusion. They work together to defeat the con artist onmyōji, who was blaming Jami for "yokai" attacks perpetrated by his shikigami. Impressed with his loyalty, Rikuo performed sakazuki with Jami who accepted because Rikuo reminded him of his former lord. He currently resides in the Nura clan main house. Jami is also a powerful yokai, being able to lightly wound Tsuchigumo.
Despite Jami's loyalty, he has never performed Equip with Rikuo.

=== Daruma Alliance ===
Located in Chōfu, Tokyo.

Mokugyo Daruma (木魚達磨, Mokugyo Daruma)
Voiced by: Shinpachi Tsuji (Japanese); Keith Silverstein (English)
Leader of Nura Clan's Daruma Alliance and one of Nurarihyon's advisers. He fought Shokera 400 years ago. He appears to have no mouth, but can still speak.

=== Yakushi Clan ===
The main clan of the Yakushi Clan is based in Kanagawa Prefecture and is composed of bird yōkai whose leader is considered to be the commander of medicines and poisons. By dipping their feathers in alcohol, one can create a potent poison, and the Zen Sect is able to turn any medicine poisonous. At birth, these bird yōkai are beautiful birds, and their wings only become poisonous when they come of age. As a result, they have weak bodies and short lifespans. Their symbol is two crossed feathers.

Zen (鴆, Zen)
Voiced by: Tomokazu Sugita (Japanese); Keith Silverstein (English)
A poisonous bird yōkai who was a childhood friend of Rikuo's. He was disappointed that upon meeting him again, Rikuo had become so soft. Like the rest of his species, he has a short lifespan and a weak constitution, but he specializes in making medicine. When he gets overly worked up, he can lapse into bloody coughing fits. He was rescued by "Night" Rikuo after being betrayed and nearly killed. He continues to support Rikuo and is the first of the Nura yōkai to exchange sakazuki with him. He tells Rikuo to form a new "Hyakki Yakō", as most of the yōkai of the Nura house hold loyalty to the former Nura head and don't view Rikuo as their leader. He joins the force of Nura yōkai who head out to fight Hagoromo Gitsune. He breaks up the battle between Kubinashi and Itaku by pouring medicine over them – and only mentions that it is non-poisonous after the fight stops. Rikuo later punches him for coming along despite his ill health. He is known to complain vociferously when he is left behind when others go off to fight, and becomes the first to perform the Matoi technique with Rikuo. Although throughout much of the series he serves in the role of healer, he also occasionally fights with a sword.
Hebidayu (蛇太夫, Hebidayu)
Voiced by: Masahito Yabe (Japanese); Steve Kramer (English)
A yōkai who looks like a scaly humanoid with a snake's head who can elongate his neck or turn into a large snake. Though he has exchanged sakazuki with Zen, he claims that he only followed Zen because he was the easiest ride to the top. After Zen met with Rikuo and learned that the latter had no intention of succeeding to Nurarihyon's position, Hebidayu turned against him. Along with several like-minded subordinates, he burned down the Zen sect's house and tried to kill Zen, but was killed by "Night" Rikuo.

=== Gyuki Clan ===
The Gyuki Clan's mansion sits atop Mt. Nejireme in Shiga Prefecture, which forms the western boundary of the Nura Clan's territory. They are said to manipulate, bewilder and draw in humans in order to kill them, and their clan emblem is the character for "dread". 400 years ago, the Gyuki Clan was one of the strongest warrior factions and fought against the Nura Clan of the time.

Gyuki (牛鬼, Gyūki)
(Adult) Voiced by: Jōji Nakata (Japanese); Taylor Henry (English)
(Child) Voiced by: Eri Kitamura (Age 7), Sachi Kokuryu (Age 12) (Japanese); Wendee Lee (Age 7), Julie Ann Taylor (Age 12) (English)
Gyuki is the name given to the fearsome yōkai which lives on Mt. Nejireme, said to have the face of a cow and the body of a spider. According to legend, he disguises himself as a human and when he reveals his true appearance, it is even more dreadful than his reputation would imply. He has pledged undying loyalty to Nurarihyon, who offered to be Gyuki's surrogate father when they exchanged sakazuki.
Gyuki was once a human named Umewakamaru who was born into a house of nobles. At the age of seven, after his father's death, he began serving at the temple on Mt. Hiei to pray for his father's soul, and it was during this time that his mother left him there and went off on her own. Though Umewakamaru showed a great aptitude for his studies and learning, his peers at the temple became jealous and injured him several times. Realizing he didn't belong there and missing his mother, he snuck out of the temple and began making his way to the capital. At Ootsu, he was tricked by a pair of yōkai who claimed that his mother was ill and staying with them on Mt. Nejireme. As a result, he was eaten by the same yōkai which had devoured his mother. However, through the power of his hatred and will, he was reborn as a yōkai after his death – destroying the yōkai which had killed his mother and himself in the process. That yōkai was the previous Gyuki, and over time the yōkai who had once been Umewakamaru became known by the same name.
Gyuki is a high ranking subordinate of the Nura clan, and one Nurarihyon's advisers. He was in charge of both the Kyuso Clan's attempt at relieving Rikuo of the title of Third Head and the attacks on Mt. Nejireme. It was revealed that this coup was meant as a test, to see if Rikuo was capable of leading the Nura Clan. Though originally, he tells Rikuo to abandon his human side (as it will likely get him killed), later Gyuki tells Rikuo to embrace both his yōkai and human aspects in order to achieve an even greater power. He later appears in Kyoto after Rikuo loses to Tsuchigumo, and helps him train to unlock the ability, Matoi. After Rikuo succeeds his grandfather and becomes the new head of the Nura Clan, Gyuki retires from his role as a sub-commander to make room for the younger yōkai who have earned the role under Rikuo's leadership. However, he continues to serve as both personal adviser to Rikuo, as well as one of the clan's financial advisers.
Gozumaru (牛頭丸, Gozumaru)
Voiced by: Hiroyuki Yoshino (Japanese); Jason Wishnov (English)
The Gyuki Clan's young head. Cool and cruel, he wields a katana and can also make large insect-like pincers spring from his back. Though able to control creatures via strings, he is not as proficient with the skill as Mezumaru. During Gyuki's conspiracy against Rikuo, Gozumaru separated Rikuo and Tsurara in order to eliminate the latter. When he was about to deliver the finishing blow, Rikuo appeared and rescued Tsurara by defeating Gozumaru despite not being in full "Night" form. Gozumaru is fiercely loyal to Gyuki and even after Gyuki's defeat and subsequent pardon, he still has a low opinion of Rikuo. As a candidate for the Gyuki Clan's next leader, he now lives in the Nura house, though his presence there is also that of a hostage as stipulated in Gyuki's pardon. At one point, he and Mezumaru were sent to the 88 kiyako's base on a reconnaissance mission. Disguised as tanuki, they snuck their way into a restricted area but were discovered and attacked by Tamazuki. Heavily injured, he and Mezumaru were rescued by the Sanba Garasu.
Together with Mezumaru, the first portion of their names form Gozumezu, the term for the horse-headed and ox-headed demons who serve as guardians of the underworld in Chinese mythology.
Mezumaru (馬頭丸, Mezumaru)
Voiced by: Sōichirō Hoshi (Japanese); Steve Cannon (English)
Gyuki Clan's young head assistant. He wears a horse's skull on the top of his head, covering his eyes and upper facial features. Although he is male, he has a face that looks like a girl which embarrasses him whenever Gozumaru makes fun of his appearance. He usually acts in support Gozumaru and lives in the Nura house with him.

=== Bakeneko Clan ===
A clan of anthropomorphic cat yōkai who were originally put in charge of Ukiyoe Town's First District, but were later usurped by the Kyuso Clan. They are a group that has existed for a long time and had built up evil deeds as gamblers before being taken under the Nura Clan's wing. Under their clan's control, the First District thrived as a place for yōkai entertainment – their specialty being gambling. Despite this, the clan seeks to govern their territory with dignity so as not to disgrace the Nura Clan. After regaining control of the First District, they open a Japanese style yōkai eatery called Bakenekoya. The restaurant had existed since the Golden Age of Edo, but was open to humans as well during the time.

Ryota Neko (良太猫, Ryōta Neko)
Voiced by: Makoto Ishii (Japanese); Bryce Papenbrook (English)
Head of the Bakeneko Clan and leader of 1st street, he requested that Rikuo free the 1st street from the Kyuso Clan. He later reappears at the yōkai party for Kana and is a known gambler.
Saburo Neko (三郎猫, Saburō Neko)
Voiced by: Shōhei Kajikawa (Japanese); Erik Scott Kimerer (English)
He is a member of the Bakeneko Clan and an employee at Bakenekoya. He was attacked by Muchi, which left him in a coma. Whether this was temporary has yet to be seen, but he has not appeared in the series since then.

=== Kyuso Clan ===
The Kyuso Clan is composed of rat yōkai, many of which disguise themselves as humans to lure in unsuspecting prey. They have a rivalry with the Bakeneko clan and are used by Gyuki in a conspiracy against Rikuo. Though technically part of the Nura Clan, their leader doesn't approve of Rikuo and they have considered the main house to be weak since the Second Heir's death. When their existence as part of the Nura Clan is brought into question, Nurarihyon wonders why they hadn't been expelled yet.

Kyuso (旧鼠, Kyūso)
Voiced by: Takehito Koyasu (Japanese); Doug Erholtz (English)
Head of the Kyuso Clan and self-proclaimed "emperor of the night". He is an anthropomorphic rat yōkai who first appears as a light-haired playboy going by the name Seiya. He runs a host club, "Club Chu" near the east entrance of Ukiyoe Town's shopping district (the name of which is a pun – in Japanese, "chu" is both the sound a mouse/rat makes, and the sound of a kiss). He calls Gyuki "boss" and acts like a cheerful playboy to attract women to the club – where he and his underlings literally devour them in the basement. In reality, he is a cruel and cold-hearted rat who takes advantage of people's weaknesses. He is able to summon rats to do his bidding, and seems to hate rejection. Kyuso kidnaps Yura and Kana to use as bait in luring out Rikuo, and declares that his clan intends to take over as leaders of the Nura Clan. He orders Rikuo to send out a decree to all the Nura Clan leaders stating that he retracts his claim to be the Third, threatening to kill Yura and Kana if Rikuo doesn't comply. When "Night" Rikuo and the Hyakki Yakō of the main house thwart his plans, Kyūso changes into a large grotesque rat and tries to kill Rikuo. However, he is burned to death by "Night" Rikuo's "Ougi Meikyō Shisui, Sakura" technique.

=== Kanto Great Ape Alliance ===
Located in Yamanashi Prefecture.

Hihi (狒々, Hihi)
Voiced by: Koji Tsujitani (Japanese); Tony Oliver (English)
The former leader of Kanto Great Ape Alliance. He wears a miko suit and a noh mask and was killed by Muchi. Before he was killed, he told his son to choose for himself whether or not he would follow Rikuo. 400 years ago, he looked like a normal human, but in the present day Hihi had red skin (as depicted in the anime) and never removed his mask.
Shōei (猩影, Shōei)
Voiced by: Takanori Hoshino (Japanese); Liam O'Brien (English)
The son of Hihi. His father was murdered by the Shikoku yōkai. He is larger than most other yōkai in the group and strong enough to stop a charging Takarabune with the help of Reira freezing the ground. In the Hundred Tales Clan Arc, he asks Rikuo's help to investigate mysterious disappearances in his area. He cuts open a pathway into Toryanse's domain and perform's Matoi with Rikuo to defeat Toryanse. Shoei reflected on his father's words about choosing to follow Rikuo or not, seeing that a Nura clan commander's true strength comes from helping and rescuing weaker subordinates. He wears a noh mask like his father's when in serious battle, once claiming to be borrowing his strength.

=== One-Eyed Demon Clan ===
Located in Saitama Prefecture.

Hitotsume Nyudo (一ツ目入道, Hitotsume Nyūdō)
Voiced by: Takashi Matsuyama (Japanese); Patrick Seitz (English)
Leader of One-Eyed Demon Clan, he greatly opposes the idea of Rikuo as the Third Head of the Nura Clan. 400 years ago, he had a much different opinion of humans, stating of Kokehime after saving her from Hagoromo Gitsune, "Even if her tears became pearls, the one that fits her best is her smile."

=== Gagoze Alliance ===
Gagoze (ガゴゼ, Gagoze)
Voiced by: Kōsei Hirota (Japanese); Liam O'Brien (English)
Head of the Gagoze Alliance. He was known as a yōkai that kidnapped and ate children. During Nurarihyon's prime, Gagoze loyaly followed his commander's orders and seems to be one of the yokai who believed in eating human livers, since he wondered if that was the reason Nurarihyon brought Yohime with him. After Rihan's death, Gagoze and many of the Nura clan believed that he would be chosen as Nurarihyon's heir and were greatly surprised when Rikuo was named instead. As a result, he tried to kill Rikuo to regain his place as presumptive heir, but the plan failed and he and his subordinates were killed by the young "Night" Rikuo and his fledgling Hyakki Yakō.

=== Land Gods ===
Said to form the foundations of the yōkai world.

Senba (千羽, Senba)
Voiced by: Hiroshi Kamiya (Japanese); Steve Cannon (English)
One of the land gods. Senba has the power to heal disease if someone offers a thousand origami cranes to his shrine; the depths of the wishes those who pray to him make his power grow stronger. Because of years being neglected, he has become small and weak. However, he noted that "Lady Hibari" paid visit to his shrine throughout her life, something that brought him great joy. Thanks to Hibari's faith, he's able to heal Natsumi from Sodemogi's curse. Thanks to Hibari's prayer, he seems to have regained his proper size. Due to Rikuo now knowing of his shrine's existence, Senba may have regular visitors sent to him.
In the anime, Natsumi is the one who visited his shrine over the years, and it was her friends who prayed for her recover instead; Hibari is rewritten to have simply have been ill and Natsumi had prayed to Senba.
Kokehime (苔姫, Kokehime)
Voiced by: Aiko Okubo (Japanese); Kira Buckland (English)
One of the land gods. She wears a Heian-style kimono and usually stays in her shrine. Kokehime was almost cursed by Sodemogi but saved by Kurotabo. 400 years ago, Kokehime was a human, but because of her power that made her tears into pearls, she was targeted by Hagoromo Gitsune. After being saved by the Nura Clan, she moved to Edo. She was shown to be attached to Hitotsume Nyudo after the defeat of Hagorome Gitsune 400 years ago. Afterwards she was worshiped by the people and became a land god.
Shirohebi
The land god of Ukioye town's middle school, who appears in an omake chapter as one of the school mysteries. Due to his age, Shirohebi has become too weak to leave his dwelling in the school pond, something he reminds Karasu-Tengu of when invited to visit the main house. Some time in the past he had a child with a human and his yokai blood granted his descendants great luck, resulting in (at least) his grandchildren becoming rich. His great-granddaughter visits him regularly with offerings and he cares greatly for her, since she's worried about fitting in with humans due snake-like features she inherited. When a collective of yokai cats bothers her, Shirohebi meets with Rikuo and they explain that the Nura clan protects Shirohebi, along with all of his family.

== Tono Village ==
Also known as the yōkai Hidden Village. The yōkai here are neutral and generally do not take sides in the conflicts between yōkai outside of the village. However, the village leaders do not prevent others from leaving if they wish. Some of them are at odds with the Nura Clan because Nurarihyon once convinced a large number of their yōkai to follow him. The village is so full of Yokai aura that light rarely reaches it. Due to this, when Rikuo goes there to train, he is able to stay his Night form at all times. All of the yōkai listed below with the exception of Akagappa and Namahage leave with Rikuo when he goes to fight in Kyoto.

Akagappa (赤河童, Akagappa)
Voiced by: Atsushi Miyauchi (Japanese); Taylor Henry (English)
The leader of the village and possibly the strongest yōkai in the village. Akagappa has said that he need to keep his blood sugar up during stressful conversations or else he'll stumble over his words. It's implied that he respects Nurarihyon, since he would have gone with the others that were recruited from Tono, if he hadn't been in charge of the village.
Itaku (イタク, Itaku)
Voiced by: Daisuke Kishio (Japanese); J.C. Miller (English)
A Kamaitachi yōkai instructed to watch and teach Rikuo. He fights using two or three sickles and his best skill is "Yōkai Ninpo: Rera Makiri", a sickle wind blade. He, like most others, dislike the Kyoto Yokai. He turns into a weasel faced yōkai in the day time. When he gets serious in a fight, he takes a different form, which is his weasel self with a sharper face and his sickles fused into his arms.It is later revealed that Itaku is being groomed to take Akagappa's place as Tono's leader.
Amezo (雨造, Amezō)
Voiced by: Takahiro Mizushima (Japanese); Tony Oliver (English)
A Numa Kappa yōkai, he normally cleans the bathrooms. He fights using water, and usually spars with Awashima. He lists Tsuchigumo in his Top 10 list of fighters.
Awashima (淡島, Awashima)
Voiced by: Ryoka Yuzuki (Japanese); Julie Ann Taylor (English)
An Amanojaku yōkai who normally chops the firewood, Awashina is male by day and female by night; though Awashima is self-considered male. As a female, Awashima's attack is hatsu "Dance of the Battle Maiden" and hyoi of the heavenly nymph Perfect Motherhood Izanami". But as a male, Awashima can use hyoi of the raging god, "Perfect Fatherhood Izanagi". Awashima is named after the second child of Izanagi and Izanami in the Kojiki, Awashima no Kami, who was discarded for being intersex. Awashima consinders himself to be similar to Rikuo because both of them take on a different form at night.
Oddly, though Rikuo remains in his Night form constantly while in Tono, Awashima still changes between sexes.
Reira (冷麗, Reira)
Voiced by: Megumi Toyoguchi (Japanese); Erika Harlacher (English)
A Yuki Onna who normally prepares the baths, she was able to temporarily freeze Kidomaru. Reira discovered that Yuki Onna can use a hot spring so long as they can control their Fear; she tried helping Tsurara getting the hang of this, but was unable to do so.
Yukari (紫, Yukari)
Voiced by: Fumiko Orikasa (Japanese); Cristina Vee (English)
A Zashiki Warashi yōkai, she seems to be the only child in the village. Her type of yokai brings good fortune to those around her. Yukari finds Itaku and Rikuo's daytime appearance to be cute. Her size differs between manga and anime; the manga shows her to be the size of doll, while the anime has Yukari as a normal-sized child. In the English dub, Yukari's laugh is replaced by coughing, implying she has a cold.
Dohiko (土彦, Dohiko)
Voiced by: Eiji Miyashita (Japanese); Patrick Seitz (English)
A Huttachi yōkai in charge of cleaning. He communicate with and control animals.
Namahage (なまはげ, Namahage)
Voiced by: Mitsuaki Madono (Japanese); Geoffrey Chalmers (English)
Two Namahage from Tono, red and blue colored.

== Kiyojuji Paranormal Patrol ==
A group of students formed by Kiyotsugu Kiyojuji to investigate yōkai and the master of all spirits, Nurarihyon, and is named after him. They go wherever yōkai are spotted and are in Kyoto under the Keikain protection. In addition to those listed here, the following are also members: Rikuo Nura, Tsurara Oikawa, Kurata (Aotabou's human identity) and Yura Keikain. After the battle with the Hundred Tales Clan, the entire group now knows of Rikuo's dual identity. A flashback to the Golden Age of Edo shows that with the exception of Yura, Rikuo and Tsurara, the group are reincarnations of children whom Yamabuki Otome once taught. The group is last seen with the rest of the Yokai welcoming a recovered Rikuo back home.

Kiyotsugu Kiyojuji (清十字 清継, Kiyojuji Kiyotsugu)
Voiced by: Kisho Taniyama (Japanese); Sam Riegel (English)
Rich and influential among his class, he used to tease Rikuo about yōkai until he was saved by "Night" Rikuo four years before the present. As a result, he developed an almost suicidal obsession with yōkai, even to the point of wanting to be kidnapped by them (not realizing that kidnapping would be the least of worries under those circumstances). Kiyotsugu has also wanted to meet Rikuo's yokai form again ever since, referring to him as "the Lord of Darkness". Ironically, either due to bad luck or stupidity, Kiyotsugu never sees any of the yokai present until the Hundred Tales Arc. He is constantly inventing new yōkai-related games and quizzes and has a very forceful personality. Only Shima and Yura ever want to join Kiyosugu in his yōkai hunts full-heartedly. Kiyotsugu proved himself a loyal friend to Rikuo during the Hundred Tales Arc, when he risked his life to film Night Rikuo destroying evil yōkai to prove to everyone who watched the film that Rikuo wasn't a villainous yōkai trying to kill humans. Upon meeting Rikuo's yōkai form again, Kiyotsugu is flustered by his idol's gratitude.
Natsumi Torii (鳥居 夏実, Torii Natsumi)
Voiced by: Mana Hirata (Japanese); Erika Harlacher (English)
Rikuo's classmate who has cat-like eyes, Tori is a member of the Kiyojuji Paranormal Patrol. She was cursed by Sodemogi and nearly dies until Senba is given power by Natsumi's grandmother's belief, saving her life. In chapter 144, while heading home, Natsumi saw Kurotabo, the yōkai who saved her, and followed him, eventually losing her way. She then saw a small house and sneaked a peek inside and saw a yōkai painting, scared by this, she tries to escape only to be caught by a tall yōkai. The yōkai then gets inside the house and annoys a yōkai painter for being slow at his work. The yōkai painter explains that he needs "inspiration", that's when the yōkai shows the now seemingly knocked-out Natsumi and the yōkai painter gets to work, eager to find out how the "story" goes now with his new inspiration. A few days later, Saori notices Natsumi's absence and informs everyone, meanwhile Kiyotsugu tells the Investigation squad of a new urban legend. The urban legend tells that the some subways are haunted, including a particular one where a young couple left behind an infant in one of the coin lockers. Even though the baby had died, the baby never stopped growing and to this day has grown considerably. The image of the grown baby matches with Natsumi's face and body, but with a more crazed look, speculating that Natsumi has become a yōkai. However, it turned out that a yōkai was modeled by the artist after Natsumi and the real Natsumi was later rescued by Maki and Kurotabo in chapter 146.
Saori Maki (巻 紗織, Maki Saori)
Voiced by: Kana Asumi (Japanese); Wendee Lee (English)
A classmate of Rikuo's and Natsumi's close friend, Saori is an early bloomer. She is more concerned with relaxing at the spots that the Kiyojuji Paranormal Patrol visits, rather than Kiyotsugu's primary objective of finding yōkai. Saori appears to be easily agitated, and is very protective of Natusmi to the point of overreacting – Kurotabo accidentally bumped into Natsumi while riding a train with Rikuo's other guards, and Saori even got officers involved because of it. She stays with the Natsumi in the hospital after Senba rescues her from Sodemogi's curse. She's a tad smarter than Natsumi since she remembers warnings relating to how to defend oneself against yōkai.
Jiro Shima (島 二郎, Shima Jirō)
Voiced by: Tetsuya Kakihara (Japanese); Donn A. Nordean (English)
Kiyotsugu's underling who has been following Kiyotsugu wherever he has led since they were kids. It's hinted that the only reason Shima hangs out with Kiyotsugu is because he's rich. He has a crush on Tsurara's human form and attends meetings only to be close to Tsurara. This is reinforced in chapter 144, where Shima tells Kiyotsugu that their meeting is meaningless since Tsurara isn't present.

== Keikain House ==
The premiere onmyōji house that protects the seals around Kyoto. Their bloodline has been cursed by Hagoromo Gitsune so that all males die an early death. Thus males from branch families are taken into the main family to supplement its strength.

Hidemoto Keikain (花開院 秀元, Keikain Hidemoto)
Voiced by: Hikaru Midorikawa (Japanese); Liam O'Brien (English)
The 13th head of the Keikain family, who lived 400 years ago. Hidemoto was an old friend of Nurarihyon's, having met him when the yōkai was trying to steal food from his home. He respected Nurarihyon and his desire to protect humans and yōkai alike, even telling him that they could meet again after his death if he asks for one of his descendants to cast Hagun. He fought alongside Nurarihyon against Hagoromo Gitsune. using the shikigami, Hagun, which summons the spirits of all the previous heads of the Keikain family. He lends the spirit blade, Nenekirimaru, to Nurarihyon during the battle during which he tricked Tsuchigumo into falling into a deep sleep and later sealed him. After Hidemoto died he became part of Hagun himself. He reappears in chapter 81 to guide Yura in using Hagun's power. The 27th heir of the Keikain family was named after him.
Ryuji Keikain (花開院 竜二, Keikain Ryūji)
Voiced by: Katsuyuki Konishi (Japanese); Kevin Delaney (English)
He is Yura's older brother and he subscribes to the belief that the world is black and white, with yōkai being absolute black, whereas he and the rest of the onmyōji are white, causing him to have no hesitation in striking yōkai down. He is able to discern that Rikuo is a yōkai as soon as they meet, much to Yura's disbelief, and attacks him to make him change into his "Night" form to prove his point. Despite the shock of discovering Rikuo's true nature, Yura defends him against her brother who abandons the fight out of respect for Rikuo's human blood, saying he doesn't accept "grey" existences; such an existence would cause him to start questioning whether all yōkai are evil, just as Yura has. He is later revealed to have been a potential candidate for the leadership of the household and is injured in his fight with Akifusa and rescued by Mamiru. After Yura discovers her ability to summon "Hagun", and is subsequently named the future leader of the Keikain house, Ryuji begins to show slightly more respect for her. However, Ryuji is still not above using Yura as a pack mule for hauling the luggage he needs on missions.
Mamiru Keikain (花開院 魔魅流, Keikain Mamiru)
Voiced by: Kenji Nojima (Japanese); Steve Cannon (English)
A member of a branch family, he is completely devoted to destroying yōkai to the point where he will fight even if outnumbered. He is said to be the most talented in the house so far and was able to defeat Aotabo, albeit while the latter was in his sealed form. Originally a happy and kind person Yura got along with well, Mamiru changed when he became host to his lightning shikigami, and underwent training to protect Yura; he is now mostly expressionless and usually mumbles combat advice that he's using. He later explains that he changed to protect Yura, the next head of the family.
Masatsugu Keikain (花開院 雅次, Keikain Masatsugu)
Voiced by: Hirofumi Nojima (Japanese); Todd Stone (English)
The protector of the third seal and next leader of the Fukuju branch family, he specializes in barriers and seals. He was defeated at the third seal and is trapped by Hagoromo Gitsune but later rescued by Mamiru.
Pato Keikain (花開院 破戸, Keikain Pato)
Voiced by: Asami Sanada
The protector of the second seal and next leader of the Aika branch family, he is a child who uses the original shikigami "Gomoramaru", a large black cyclops. He is usually seen levitating by focusing on a crystal ball. He was defeated at the third seal and is trapped by Hagoromo Gitsune but rescued by Mamiru. As revealed in the "Yokai Brain" bonus section, Pato can use his crystal to give fortunes to others.
Akifusa Keikain (花開院 秋房, Keikain Akifusa)
Voiced by: Showtaro Morikubo (Japanese); Kaiji Tang (English)
The protector of the first seal and next leader of the Yaso branch family, he was Yura's teacher and uses "Yoso Kioku", a blade he constructed to surpass Hidemoto's blade. It possesses him turning him into a demon to fight. He was defeated at the third seal and fought against the Keikain house at the second seal after being possessed by Minagoroshi Jizo who used the darkness in his heart to take him over. He constructed weapons for the demons to use against the barriers sealing Hagoromo Gitsune and fought Ryuji, stating that he always wanted to fight him since they were both candidates for leadership of the main family. He was purged by Yura and rescued by Ryuji. Rikuo later asks him to reforge Nenekirimaru into a stronger blade to use against Nue. Akifusa unknowingly asks one of Nue (Seimei)'s descendants for assistance in forging the blade, until Rikuo later saves him.

== Antagonists ==
=== Shikoku Hachijuhakki Yako ===
A group of yōkai from the Shikoku area, they were rivals of the Nura Clan during the Shikoku Arc. Setting up base in a skyscraper overlooking Ukiyoe Town, they went on a rampage until they faced off against Rikuo. The group dissolved after most of its members were killed by Tamazuki.

Inugamigyobu Tamazuki (隠神刑部玉章, Inugamigyōbu Tamazuki)
Voiced by: Akira Ishida (Japanese); Vic Mignogna (English)
Leader of the Shikoku Hachijuhakki Yako, his father is the head of the Shikoku Hachijuhakki Yako Tanuki and belongs to the family of Inugamigyobu (lit. hidden god of judgement) Tanuki. In truth, his real name is "Tamazusa"; he changed it to reflect his desires. He is able to inspire his men through his charisma but sees them as disposable. He seeks to return the world to darkness, even inviting Rikuo to join his group. He gained his power by killing his allies and brothers using the Mao's Hammer, the very sword that defeated his clan in the past. He is defeated by Rikuo and spared in deference to his father's request on the condition that he never leave Shikoku and hold a memorial for the allies he killed out of his lust for power. Rikuo later calls upon him and the other yōkai clans in Japan for aid in facing Nue; Tamazuki agrees as he knows Rikuo's strength first-hand and that any force great enough to challenge him is one to be feared.
Inugami (犬神, Inugami)
Voiced by: Nobuhiko Okamoto (Japanese); Erik Scott Kimerer (English)
One of the seven heads of the Shikoku Hachijuhakki Yako, he is a human-turned-Inugami who serves Tamazuki faithfully. He was bullied relentlessly by a group of humans led by Tamazuki and killed them, releasing his power. He hates and envies Rikuo for having both human and yōkai allies. He can transform into a large dog or separate his head from his body. He is killed by Tamazuki for failing to kill Rikuo, and because he now feared Rikuo, making his grudge-based Fear weak. When Tamazuki is pulled into Yosuzume's Mirror World, he is shown to actually regret killing Ingami.
A stray dog appears at the end of the Arc that may be his reincarnation. Tamazuki is later shown caring for the dog, even bringing it with him to the meeting of all clans that Rikuo called.
Yosuzume (夜雀, Yosuzume)
Voiced by: Miyuki Sawashiro
One of the seven heads of the Shikoku Hachijuhakki Yako. A yōkai whose ability, "Genyako", temporarily blinds whoever gets her black feathers in their eyes. She faced Tsurara who froze her right eye before Yosuzume scattered her feathers and was thus able to see and defeat her. She later takes the Maō's Hammer from Tamazuki and returns it to Mitsume Yazura of the Nura Clan, who started the incident. She later appears to be serving Minagoroshi Jizo of the Kyoto Yokai, as a secret servant. The Hundred Tales Clan also make use of her.
She is later revealed to be the shikigami of the Fourth Heir of Gokadoin, with the hidden ability to pull others into a mirror world where their greatest sins come back to haunt them.
Inuhoo (犬鳳凰, Inuhōō)
Voiced by: Takeda Masanori (Japanese); Keith Silverstein (English)
One of the seven heads of the Shikoku Hachijuhakki Yako, he is a bird yōkai who breathes fire. Tamazuki used him as a shield from one of Rikuo's attacks. In the anime, his own fire attacks were sent back at him by the Sanban Garasu, thus destroying him. A random yōkai takes his place in the battle between the Shikoku Hachijuhakki Yako and Nura Clan.

Tearai Oni (手洗い鬼, Tearai Oni)
Voiced by: Atsushi Ono (Japanese); Taylor Henry (English)
One of the seven heads of the Shikoku Hachijuhakki Yako. An Oni who is so large it's said he straddles the gaps between mountains, he is the strongest of the group but loses to Aotabo after he removes his skull necklace.
Muchi (鞭, Muchi)
Voiced by: Satoshi Tsurouka (Japanese); Dave Mallow (English)
A Kamaitachi yōkai from Shikoku that manipulates the wind like a whip to cut enemies or make them fall ill. He targeted Nurarihyon on Tamazuki's orders, but was defeated and disappeared into the wind.
Lord Sodemogi (袖モギ様, Sodemogi-sama)
Voiced by: Chō (Japanese); Geoffrey Chalmers (English)
One of the seven heads of the Shikoku Hachijuhakki Yako. A yōkai who kills other land gods (tsuchigami) who can't fight back and turns their beliefs into his Fear. Legend says that if you receive a tug on your sleeve and turn to see no one there, it is Sodemogi who will then curse you. He seems to enjoy devouring articles of clothing from others. He curses Natsumi, eating away at her life force, and as a result, is killed by Kurotabo to pay back the favor he owed her.
Gangi Kozo (岸涯小僧, Gangi Kozō)
Voiced by: Tetsuo Goto (Japanese); Tony Oliver (English)
One of the seven heads of the Shikoku Hachijuhakki Yako, he is a reptile-like yōkai found near riverbanks. He has zig-zag teeth which he uses to eat fish and animals. At the 88 kiyakō's headquarters, he guarded the entrance to a restricted area before encountering the undercover Gozumaru and Mezumaru. Using their string-manipulation skills, they used him to gain access to important areas of the headquarters, as well as to attack his fellows – which resulted in breaking his teeth. He fought Kappa in the battle against Rikuo's Hyakki Yakō.
Hari Onna (針女, Hari Onna)
Voiced by: Ai Orikasa (Japanese); Jane Alan (English)
One of the seven heads of the Shikoku Hachijuhakki Yako, she is a yōkai who can turn her hair into hooks. She fought Kejoro in the battle against Rikuo's Hyakki Yakō but was unable to defeat her and was later killed by Tamazuki. She was also known as Kagibari Onna in the anime.

=== Kyoto Yokai ===
Known as the central yōkai, they are considered the most blood-thirsty and only fight in mortal combat. However, after Seimei's betrayal of his own mother, Hagoromo Gitsune, they are reformed, but some of them, e.g. Ibaraki-Doji and Kidomaru, still follow Seimei's will.

Hagoromo Gitsune (羽衣狐, Hagoromo Gitsune)
Voiced by: Mamiko Noto (Japanese); Johanna Luis (English)
A yōkai fox (kitsune = gitsune) who was originally considered the master of spirits, she is the head of the Kyoto Yokai. According to Keikain records, Hagorome Gitsune appears in centers of political power during turbulent times, possesses the body of a notable child, and takes control of the body to attain adult form. From her position near the center of government she is able to gain strength by absorbing the large quantities hatred, envy, anger, despair around her and it is said that the stronger the malice in the world, the stronger she will become. Despite her ability to gain enormous strength, she can only live as long as her human host and when that body reaches the end its life (or is killed), she must hide her "true form" somewhere safe until a suitable host for her next reincarnation appears. The only way to prevent her cycle of reincarnation is to seal her "true form".
400 years ago, she posed as the legendary courtesan Yodo-dono at Osaka Castle where she fought Nurarihyon and was defeated. In the 400 years since her defeat, her reincarnation was repeatedly prevented by Rihan Nura, until Abe no Seimei and Sanmoto Gorozaemon successfully plotted his murder by reviving and manipulating Rihan's ex-wife, Yamabuki Otome. Hagoromo Gitsune later uses Yamabuki Otome's revived body as her current host and she gives birth to Nue, Abe no Seimei's reincarnation, during the battle in Kyoto. Rikuo and Yura combine their Nenekirimaru and Hangun to force Hagoromo Gitsune out of her host's body. Soon after he breaks out of his cocoon, Nue kills her and sends her to Hell. In chapter 200 she reincarnates again, in the form of Yamabuki Otome, but with seven tails. Since Nue's betrayal she has come to consider Rikuo to be her own son in Seimei's place and fights at his side in the final battle against Nue.
Kidomaru (鬼童丸, Kidōmaru)
Voiced by: Takaya Kuroda (Japanese); Marc Diraison (English)
Hagoromo Gitsune's loyal servant, he tries to recruit the Tono demons to her cause but is rebuffed. Following this he attempts to kill Rikuo. In the battle 400 years ago, he fought Hihi and stabbed Kejoro while Ibaraki Doji was fighting with her and Kubinashi. He wears an oni mask that is created by his fear when he fights seriously. He has god-like speed and his fear allows his sword to attack like tree branches spreading from a tree or cherry blossom petals scattering. He is defeated by Rikuo and Kurotabo.
Gashadokuro (がしゃどくろ, Gashadokuro)
Voiced by: Taiten Kusunoki (Japanese); Taylor Henry (English)
Gashadokuro, a large skeleton sealed under the fourth seal, is a follower of Hagoromo Gitsune. He appears at the castle and tries to devour Nurarihyon, preventing Ibaraki Doji from attacking Nurarihyon in the process.
Minagoroshi Jizo (鏖地蔵, Minagoroshi Jizō)
Voiced by: Chafurin (Japanese); Geoffrey Chalmers (English)
A yōkai who takes the form of an old man with a large eye ball in his tall forehead (cyclops); he has regular eyes, which appear slashed and therefore unusable. Yosuzume gave him the Mao's Hammer. He has altered Ibaraki Doji, Shokera, Kyokotsu and Kidomaru's memories and took up the Great Tengu of Mount Kurama's seat to further his own ambitions. He is actually the left eye of Sanmoto Gorozaemon, leader of the Edo Hyaku Monogatari Clan which Nura Rihan destroyed. Because of Akifusa's activation of a forbidden technique, he is possessed by Jizo and attacks Ryuji at the location of one of the seals. Minagoroshi Jizo was reduced to a head by an attack from Rikuo, and perished when the combined Fear of Rikuo's night parade charged in to attack Nue.
Kyokotsu (father) (狂骨, Kyōkotsu)
Voiced by: Kazuya Ichijō
A yōkai who took the form of a mummy, having skin-and-bone body covered with bandages. In the present, his daughter seems to have taken up his position and bears the same name. Having served Hagaromo Gitsune since Nue's original life, he possibly died prior to the present day, due to old age.
Kyokotsu (daughter) (狂骨, Kyōkotsu)
Voiced by: Yōko Hikasa (Japanese); Kira Buckland (English)
A Kyoto Yokai who appears as a young girl. Her father fought alongside Hagoromo Gitsune 400 years ago, and she is said to be even more capable than he was. She carries a skull with her at all times, and a countless number of snakes pour forth from it. Her Fear involves these snakes devouring the eyes of her opponent when they're afraid; they can be used to restrain or injury/poison enemies. She views Hagoromo Gitsune as an older sister of sorts and is devotedly loyal to her. Likewise, Hagoromo Gitsune is concerned about her when Kyokotsu is badly wounded in the fight against Seimei. She, Gashadokuro and Hakuzosu are the only yōkai leaders that remain loyal to Hagoromo Gitsune, and refuse to side with Seimei.
Shokera (しょうけら, Shōkera)
Voiced by: Mitsuki Saiga (Japanese); Brianne Siddall (English)
A yōkai in the form of a man with long silver hair, who is deeply religious (the religion likely being Christianity); he goes to confession for every sin he commits, even killing under Hagoromo Gitsune's orders. He can generate a blinding light, and enlarge the cross on his necklace into a spear. Shokera can turn into a form where his eyes and body became those of a bee, growing a pair of giant mosquito wings, with hands similar to those of a praying mantis. He was seen with Hagoromo Gitsune, 400 years ago when he fought Daruma. In the present, he attacks the Keikain with his insect yōkai minions to collect livers; however, he is killed by Aotabo. According to the Keikain report, Shokera is an insect yōkai that comes forth once every 60 days on "Koshin", the 57th day. He ascends to heaven and reports the sins of all humans to heaven while they are sleeping; heaven then takes the lives of sinners. This is why people mustn't sleep on the day of Koshin. To avoid this, one would spend the entire day praying to a statue of the raging god, Shomen Kongo.
Ibaraki Doji (茨木童子, Ibaraki Dōji)
Voiced by: Kenjiro Tsuda (Japanese); Matt Mercer (English)
A yōkai in the form of a man with half of his body looking like wood, and wields a Daishō. He was seen fighting Setsura 400 years ago. His Hatsu is "Onideko" which allows him to manipulate lightning and can shoot in any direction. He is quite rude and likes to see blood. The reason for this is because long ago, an old couple prayed for a child and found Ibaraki Doji who have been abandoned beside a shrine. The old man was a barber and he taught his skill to Ibaraki Doji. One day, Ibaraki Doji injured one of his customers, he panicked and without realizing it, he licked the blood on his hand. Because he was an oni, this reminded him of his taste for blood and he killed the customer and his father. For this he was thrown out of his hometown and soon his name was known by the whole nation. It was then Shuten Doji, commander of the oni, reached out to him. Shuten Doji was the first one to accept him and made him his son. The wood on his face acts as a stupa for Shuten Doji who was killed by Nue. The longer Shuten Doji's face is left uncovered, the more it seems to be taking over Ibaraki and he becomes crazed with a strong bloodlust when the stupa is removed. He also doesn't care who's in his way, he'll kill until he reaches his target; this is supported by how frightened his subordinates were. When he returns from Hell with Seimei, the stupa is repaired.
Tsuchigumo (土蜘蛛, Tsuchigumo)
Voiced by: Jūrōta Kosugi (Japanese); Richard Epcar (English)
Tsuchigumo is a large and enormously strong yōkai who joined Hagoromo Gitsune, not because he believed in her cause, but to find someone strong to fight. He is described by Hidemoto as an ayakashi that must not be encountered. Hidemoto only managed to seal Tsuchigumo 400 years ago by tricking him into a deep sleep. When Tsuchigumo is hungry, he will devour anything, whether human, yōkai or god. He is the only one of the Kyoto yōkai who remembers the Great Tengu of Mount Kurama due to him being sealed before Minagoroshi Jizo started to alter everyone's memories. He fights Rikuo twice; the first time he defeats him and the second time Rikuo is able to overcome him using Matoi with Itsuki. However, Tsuchigumo is not killed and sews himself back together and leaves to rest until Nue awakens. When Nue does awaken he is easily able to defeat Tsuchigumo. He later saves Yura from one of Seimei's descendants and then aids Rikuo using his multiple armed attack Matoi technique.
Great Tengu of Mount Kurama (鞍馬山の大天狗, Kurama-yama no Ōtengu)
Voiced by: Katsuhisa Hoki (Japanese); Geoffrey Chalmers (English)
He is a tengu. He fought Gyuki 400 years ago but he now fights with Rikuo alongside Gyuki. It is revealed when Hagoromo Gitsune became the nine-tails, he no longer had a place by her side because he had been displaced by Minagoroshi Jizo, who had altered Ibaraki Doji, Shokera, Kyokotsu and Kidomaru's memories. He stated this was the only time he could not accept the birth of the Nue because Minagoroshi Jizo had made a fool out of him and that he would stop it without fail. He and Gyuki seem to agree about the need to train Rikuo.
Abe no Seimei (安倍晴明, Abe no Seimei)
Seimei Voiced by: Rikiya Koyama (Japanese); Kevin M. Connolly (English)
Nue Voiced by: Junko Takeuchi (Japanese); Cristina Vee (English)
Abe no Seimei, later known as Nue after he is reborn, was a legendary onmyōji who lived 1,000 years ago. He was greatly respected and admired for his abilities. Humans, however, were unaware that he was half yōkai, the son of Hagoromo Gitsune and a human noble. Seimei desired to increase his power and someday make a world where yōkai, like his mother, would not have to hide from humans and could live as equals. To meet this goal, Seimei sought more power and a way for himself to live forever. To reach this goal of immortality, Abe devised a means for his mother, Hagoromo Gitsune, to give birth to him over and over again in a continuous cycle of reincarnation. However, before he could put this plan into action, his mother, in her fox form, was killed by human nobles. Devastated, Abe killed the gathered nobles and resolved to kill all humans and make a world only for yōkai. In the present, Hagoromo Gitsune, in her current form, gives birth to Abe no Seimei's reincarnation. In this new form, Seimei, now called Nue, is a pure yōkai with no traces of his former humanity. Nue fights both Rikuo and Nurarihyon and they are barely able to harm him. Fortunately for them, Nue notes that his new body is not fully "mature" and retreats to Hell, taking most of the Kyoto Yokai with him and promising to return to finish off the Nura Clan. In the final battle, he, along with his followers, are defeated for good by the united forces of the Nura and Tono clans along with the Kyoto Yokai who remained loyal to Hagoromo and Tamazuki's 88 Warriors.
Nijunanamen Senju Mukade (二十七面千手百足, Nijūnanamen Senju Mukade)
Voiced by: Makoto Yasumura
A yōkai with 27 faces, 1,000 hands and 100 feet. He is an ayakashi that takes root in the "realm of the heart" of the children he frightens. The greater the child's fear of him, the stronger he becomes. He is the guardian of the forest of bewilderment and the gate; if one's surprise at the weight of the "light/heavy stone" is great, they are drawn into his realm. He is killed by Awashima's "Hyoui of the raging god, Perfect fatherhood, Izanagi".
Hakuzozu (白蔵主, Hakuzōzu)
Voiced by: Kentaro Ito (Japanese); Joshua Tomar (English)
Hakuzozu (Hakuzōsu) is a yōkai fox (kitsune) who watches the skies of Kyoto and wields a spear called Dakini. He has a sense of honor in fighting, insisting on a one-on-one battle between himself and the commander of the opposing force. When Rikuo defeats him, he asks for death but Rikuo hits him in the head with a log instead and then tries to recruit him to his side but is rebuffed. Before he leaves, he tells Rikuo to head for Fushime Inari, the location of the first spiral seal.

=== Hundred Tales Clan ===
Originally a group of humans led by Sanmoto Gorazaemon, which told scary stories to create yōkai under their control; after 99 stories, a yōkai is born in the 100th. In the present, the clan comprises the various yōkai born of Sanmoto's body; only his loyal aid remains at the end.

Sanmoto Gorazaemon
Leader of the Hundred Tales Clan. Originally an unusually huge human, who became wealthy through the selling of timber, Sanmoto sought the powers of yōkai for himself. Creating numerous yōkai to gather fear, it became an addictive tea that made its drinker become evil. He even used the tea brainwash Kurotabo into thinking he was a yōkai created from one of the Hundred Stories. When Rihan confronted him, Sanmoto decided to use the 1000th story to turn himself into a yōkai; however, his mind was banished to Hell, while his body attacked randomly and spawned other yōkai. Allying with Nue, Sanmoto helped him manipulate Tamazuki and Hargoromo-Gitsune. When it came time for his revival, Sanmoto was betrayed by Encho; filled with rage, Sanmoto forced himself back to life, but was felled by Rikuo.
Yanagida
A yōkai, who has been Sanmoto's faithful aide since the Golden Age of Edo. After Sanmoto's death, Yanagida allied with the yōkai born of his master's corpse. In the present, he gathers scary stories to be added to the Hundred Tales. After Sanmoto's failed resurrection, Yanagida appears to have lost all remnants of his sanity; he takes off on his own, believing a new scary story can still revive Sanmoto. He later murders Encho, not wanting competition in collecting stories.
Sanmoto's Body Parts
Encho
Sanmoto's "mouth". He appears as a normal man, but with simplistic black eyes (there's no distinct difference between the iris and pupil in his eyes). A storyteller by nature, he spends his time at the theater; a fan of his was the Fourth Gokadoin leader, who he allied with. Encho's Fear manifests as kotodama, which he can use to brainwash others into believing his stories, and paralyze yōkai by speaking some of their tale. When Sanmoto resurrects, Encho is nearly absorbed back into him; however, he was saved by his Gokadoin ally, but lost his left eye. Bandaging his disfigurement, Encho spent his time observing the Gokadoin's actions for his scary stories.
Kyosai
Sanmoto's "arms". Known as the Mad Painter, for his Fear brings his illustrations to life from anything he paints on; whatever is used as the canvas becomes the material for the yōkai's body. Even if Kyosai is felled, his creations will remain. He once used Torii to create a scary story, and even temporarily turned her into a yōkai. Kyosai favors using young women as the canvases for creating his yōkai. After failing to decompose Rikuo to death with his art, Kyosai is slain by Rikuo.
Tamasaburo
Sanmoto's "facial skin". Tamasaburo can use flesh to copy someone's appearance to create disguises; he can also put these on others as well, but he can also copy personalities. He can also trap others in a stage-like dimension, where he controls the "script" for his Comedic Dance; if someone "ad-libs", his Fear is disrupted. Losing to Kubinashi, Tamasaburo was taken captive. When Sanmoto attacked the Nura Clan, Tamasaburo was badly maimed by Sanmoto reclaiming pieces of his body.
Raiden
Sanmoto's "bones". A yōkai who is more brawn than brains, Raiden is considerably larger than rest of the clan, being half the size of a building. He is able to extend his limbs for attack, claiming that his body is harder than diamond. However, Rikuo felled him with the use of his new offensive Fear technique.
Minagoroshi-Gizo
Sanmoto's "left eye". He infiltrated the Kyoto Yokai, brainwashing the top subordonites into thinking he was their ally, and taking the place of Mount Kuruma's Great Tengu. He gave the Devil's Hammer to Nue.
Nokaze
Sanmoto's "stomach". Disguised as a bespectacled woman in a large coat/dress, Nokaze has a more hideous form hidden within. The self-proclaimed "Foul Feeder" for her Ravenous appetite, she takes great pleasure in devouring humans. Initially watching humans attempt killing Rikuo, she became bored and began eating them instead. Threatening Kana, Nokaze forced Rikuo into his Night form, leading to her demise.
Brain
Sanmoto's "brain". Found by Yanagida in the remains of Sanmoto's yōkai body as an infant, it was taken in by the rest of its brethren; it serves as a medium through which Sanmoto can communicate from Hell. By the present, Brain is posing as a member of the Nura Clan, thanks to Tamasaburo. Encho betrays and badly wounds the Brain out of annoyance, angering Sanmoto; Brain consumed the remains of the Fear used to power Aooadon, transforming into an incomplete Demon King Sanmoto Gorazemon.
Devil's Hammer
Sanmoto's "heart". When Sanmoto was rampaging, he found himself at a disadvantage; he pulled out his own heart, turning it into a weapon. It absorbs fear from every yōkai it fells. When a sufficient amount of power is infused into the blade, it becomes a grotesque mix of flesh and bone. 300 years ago, it was used by humans to defend their castle against Inogamigyubo-Tankui's forces; it was later recovered and given to Hargoromo-Gitsune/Yamabuki-Otohime to slay Rihan. Tamazuki would later gain possession of it, slaughtering most of his own Night Parade to strengthen it. In the end, the blade was given to Nue.

== Other Yokai ==
Ungaikyo (雲外鏡, Ungaikyō)
Voiced by: Mitsuo Iwata (Japanese); Tony Oliver (English)
Also known as "the purple mirror". A yōkai that resembles a huge flaming skull attached to a tiny lion-like body. It rides a bicycle and is able to travel via mirrors, trapping its victims in the same manner. If you look into its mirror, you will be killed on your thirteenth birthday. Kana first encountered it when she was 6 years old, when she and some other children found and looked into a purple mirror. The rest of the children turned up missing (and eventually dead) after they started middle school. It reappears on Kana's 13th birthday with the intent to kill her but is stopped by "Night" Rikuo.
Isome Isoguchi (五十目五十口, Isome Isoguchi)
A yōkai with 50 eyes and 50 mouths who attacked Nurarihyon 400 years ago. She took over the shrine of Iso no Kami (a seashore god) and took Hitotsume Nyudo by surprise when he mistook her multitude of eyes to be an attacking the Hyakki Yako. She dresses like a courtesan with a veil over her head and face, and appears like a human until she removes the veil and clothes – there are eyes and mouths covering her face and running up and down her arms and legs. When she meets Nurarihyon, she claims to be good at comforting children but is subsequently shocked when a baby Rihan isn't frightened by her appearance.
Yamabuki Otome (山吹乙女, Yamabuki Otome)
Voiced by: Mamiko Noto (Japanese); Johanna Luis (English)
Yamabuki Otome was a beautiful ayakashi who became Rihan's first wife and the Nura Clan reached its greatest strength while she was at Rihan's side. Unfortunately, due to Hagoromo Gitsune's curse on the Nura bloodline, she was unable to conceive. After more than 50 years of disappointment she left Rihan, leaving behind a poem describing her pain of not being able to bear his children. It is revealed that she lost herself in a dark corner of Hell and was brought back to life in a younger form by Abe no Seimei as part of his and Sanmoto Gorazaemon's plan to eliminate Rihan. Her memories were altered and she was conditioned to kill Rihan on hearing her poem, which she did. Her body was then taken over by Hagoromo Gitsune. Years later, during the battle of Kyoto, after Hagoromo Gitsune was displaced from her body, she shielded Rikuo from Nue's attack and before she died in Rikuo's arms, she said that had she given birth to a child, he would have been just like Rikuo. Her body was given to the Kyoto yōkai who remained loyal to Hagoromo Gitsune and did not follow Nue to Hell.
Her spirit met with Rihan's during the time her body was dormant before Hagoromo Gitsune returned to it. After the battle with Semei, it's left a but unclear who's in control of the body as she said "Otome and the fox left".

== Oneshot-Exclusive Characters ==
Characters who only appeared in the original Nurarihyon no Mago oneshot. Several were later incorporated into the main story or served as inspiration for characters that appear later on. The story surrounding Jami greatly resembles the premise of this oneshot.

Yura Usami (宇佐美 ゆら, Usami Yura)
Kana's predecessor. She is Rikuo's childhood friend and neighbor who openly speaks her mind and hates supernatural things like spirits, mediums, etc. She serves as the class representative.
Daikaku Bandain (槃蛇院 大覚, Bandain Daikaku)
A supposed high-class monk skilled in exorcism who runs a very popular television show. He convinces people that their houses are haunted in order to gain control of the land and hand it over to the Shuei Construction Group. When Usami tries to prevent her grandfather's store from meeting the same fate, Daikaku kidnaps her. Later he nearly rapes her under the pretense of an exorcism, but is stopped by "Night" Rikuo. As a result, Daikan's temple is set ablaze and he is found the following morning with a significant number of injuries.

== Terminology ==
- Sakazuki (盃, Sakazuki) is a pledge of loyalty made over an exchange of wine or sake. A 50-50 portion division gives equal footing to both parties, and is considered a sakazuki of sworn brothers. A 70-30 portion division is a pledge of fealty between a boss and his subordinates.
- Ikigimo (生き肝, Ikigimo) is when a person's liver is taken out while they are still alive. Many yōkai in Nurarihyon's time believed ingesting the life force (i.e. liver) of infants, priests/priestesses and noble persons would increase their strength.
- Osore (畏, Osore) is the unique skills and traits of each yōkai. It refers to the "Fear" of the unknown, an emotional reaction produced when the yōkai represent themselves as "monsters". It is especially important for leaders who wish to draw together gangs of yōkai. There are different types of "Fear" depending on the type of yōkai, such as water or ice. It also plays an important role in battles between yōkai, in which they must "scare one another".
- Hatsu (鬼發, Hatsu) is the first stage of activating "Fear", and is simply an attempt to scare an opponent by exerting a frightening aura. Those affected by "Manifestation" will experience an overwhelming sense of intimidation, and depending on their opponent's skills, may hallucinate. This aura produces a palpable wall of pressure in the atmosphere, and cutting through this tension to reach the enemy is an important part of yōkai combat.
- Hyoui (鬼憑, Hyoui) is the second stage of activating "Fear" used in yōkai battles. It is the process by which a yōkai materializes their "Fear" into an attack that can harm their enemy by severing their "Manifestation". Yōkai can produce a variety of attacks and techniques based on their type of "Fear".
- Matoi (鬼纏, Matoi) is a special technique allowing the leader of the Hyakki Yakō to strengthen their "Fear". This technique was created by the Second Head of the Nura Clan, Rihan Nura, and will only work for a leader who is part human. The explanation for this requirement is that the leader must have a "human heart" to be able to empathize or "understand" his subordinates, in order to invoke Matoi. The technique works by "layering" or "covering" the leader in his subordinate's fear, which augments and strengthens his own power. The leader literally "wears" his subordinate, which also gives him access to his subordinate's unique abilities (when Rikuo used Matoi with Tsurara, his attacks gained the ability to freeze his targets). When Matoi is invoked with a subordinate for the first time, a tattoo-like marking appears on the leader's body, symbolizing the pact they have made.
