= INXS discography =

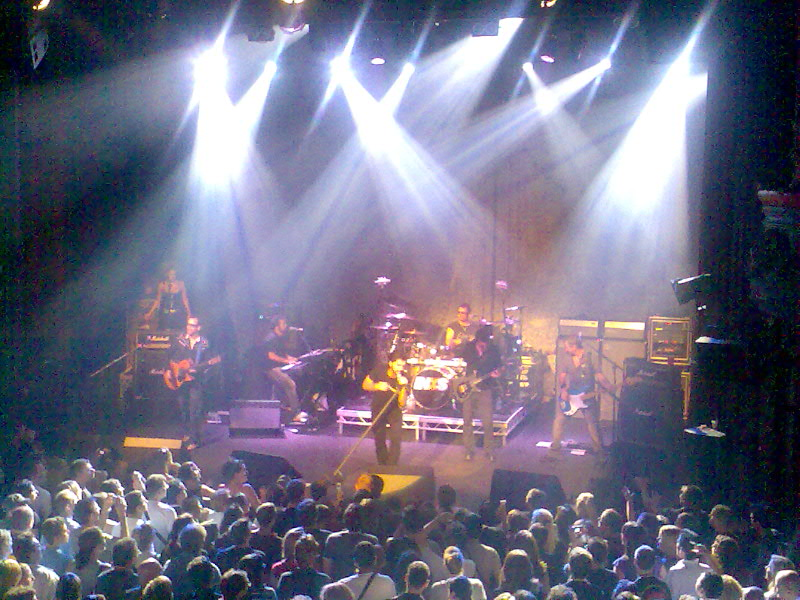
- INXS on stage with J. D. Fortune (2007)
- Studio albums: 12
- Extended plays: 5
- Live albums: 4
- Compilation albums: 12
- Singles: 71
- Video albums: 14
- Music videos: 43

The discography of INXS, an Australian rock band, consists of 12 studio albums, 71 singles, 12 compilation albums, 4 live albums 5 extended plays, 14 video albums and 43 music videos.

== Albums ==
=== Studio albums ===
Year	Album	Peak chart positions										Certifications
Year	Album	AUS	CAN	FRA	GER	NLD	NZ	SWE	SWI	UK	US	Certifications
1980	INXS: Released: 13 October 1980; Label: Deluxe Records; Format: CD, CS, LP	27	—	—	—	—	—	—	—	—	164	ARIA: Gold
1981	Underneath the Colours: Released: 19 October 1981; Label: Deluxe Records; Format: CD, CS, LP	15	—	—	—	—	—	—	—	—	—	ARIA: Gold
1982	Shabooh Shoobah: Released: October 1982; Label: Warner Music; Format: CD, CS, LP	5	—	—	—	—	—	—	—	—	46	ARIA: 2× Platinum; RIAA: Gold
1984	The Swing: Released: April 1984; Label: Warner Music; Format: CD, CS, LP	1	27	—	—	37	6	—	—	—	52	ARIA: 6× Platinum; RMNZ: Platinum; RIAA: Platinum
1985	Listen Like Thieves: Released: 14 October 1985; Label: Warner Music; Format: CD, CS, LP	1	24	—	—	—	4	—	30	48	11	ARIA: 4× Platinum; RMNZ: Platinum; RIAA: 2× Platinum
1987	Kick: Released: 19 October 1987; Label: Warner Music; Format: CD, CS, LP	2 (Note: Kick originally peaked at number two on the Kent Music Report chart dated 2 November 1987. While it reached number one on the same chart on 24 October 1988, this is not officially recognised as its peak due to ARIA becoming the official Australian music chart in June 1988, where it re-peaked at number two on 6 November 1988.)	1	3	11	4	1	21	25	9	3	ARIA: 7× Platinum; MC: Diamond; SNEP: Platinum; BVMI: Gold; NVPI: Gold; RMNZ: Platinum; IFPI SWI: Platinum; BPI: 3× Platinum; RIAA: 6× Platinum
1990	X: Released: 25 September 1990; Label: Warner Music; Format: CD, CS, LP	1	2	7	9	9	2	10	5	2	5	ARIA: 2× Platinum; MC: 2× Platinum; SNEP: Platinum; BVMI: Gold; RMNZ: Platinum; GLF: Gold; IFPI SWI: Platinum; BPI: Platinum; RIAA: 2× Platinum
1992	Welcome to Wherever You Are: Released: 4 August 1992; Label: East West Records; Format: CD, CS, LP	2	10	31	8	35	8	1	2	1	16	ARIA: Gold; MC: Gold; GLF: Gold; IFPI SWI: Gold; BPI: Gold; RIAA: Platinum
1993	Full Moon, Dirty Hearts: Released: 1 November 1993; Label: East West Records; Format: CD, CS, LP	4	19	—	27	70	36	8	9	3	53	ARIA: Gold; BPI: Gold
1997	Elegantly Wasted: Released: 15 April 1997; Label: Mercury; Format: CD, CS, LP	14	14	30	23	31	47	28	13	16	41	MC: Gold
2005	Switch: Released: 29 November 2005; Label: Epic; Format: CD	18	2	—	—	—	7	—	—	—	17	ARIA: Platinum; MC: Platinum; RMNZ: 2× Platinum
2010	Original Sin: Released: 16 November 2010; Label: Petrol Electric; Format: Download, CD	49	—	144	—	—	—	—	—	—	—	
"—" denotes releases that did not chart.

=== Live albums ===
Year	Album	Peak chart positions									Certifications
Year	Album	AUS	FRA	GER	NLD	NZ	SWE	SWI	UK	US	Certifications
1991	Live Baby Live: Released: 4 November 1991; Label: East West Records; Format: CD, CS, LP	3	31	18	26	31	39	15	8	72	ARIA: Platinum; IFPI SWI: Gold; BPI: Platinum
2005	Live at Barker Hangar: Released: 4 October 2005; Label: The Island Def Jam Music Group; Format: Download	—	—	—	—	—	—	—	—	—	
2014	Live at Wembley Stadium 1991: Released: 7 February 2014; Label: UMA; Format: Download; Note: re-released in 2019 on 2xCD and 3xLP	17	—	—	—	40	—	—	—	—	ARIA: Platinum
2022	Live at the US Festival 1983 (Shabooh Shoobah): Released: 28 October 2022; Label: Petrol; Format: LP, CD, digital	—	—	—	—	—	—	—	—	—	
"—" denotes releases that did not chart or were not released in that country.

=== Compilations ===
Year	Album	Peak chart positions										Certifications
Year	Album	AUS	BEL	FRA	GER	NLD	NZ	SWE	SWI	UK	US	Certifications
1982	INXSIVE: 1980–82: Released: 1982; Label: Deluxe Records; Format: LP, CD; Australian market only	74	—	—	—	—	—	—	—	—	—	
1994	The Greatest Hits: Released: 31 October 1994; Label: East West Records; Format: CD, CS, LP	2	45	11	9	25	2	16	7	3	112	ARIA: 2× Platinum; BRMA: Gold; SNEP: 2× Gold; BVMI: Gold; RMNZ: Platinum; IFPI SWI: Gold; BPI: Platinum; RIAA: Platinum
2001	Shine Like It Does: The Anthology (1979–1997): Released: 5 June 2001; Label: Atlantic; Format: CD	—	—	—	—	—	—	—	—	—	—	
2002	The Best of INXS: Released: 4 June 2002 (US); Label: Rhino; Format: CD	—	—	—	—	—	—	—	—	—	144	RIAA: Gold
2002	Stay Young 1979–1982: Released: 11 October 2002 (US); Label: Raven; Format: CD	—	—	—	—	—	—	—	—	—	—	
2002	Definitive INXS: Released: 2002; Label: Mercury; Format: CD	—	37	21	—	—	4	—	—	15	—	ARIA: Platinum; RMNZ: Platinum; BPI: Gold
2002	The Years 1979–1997: Released: 10 December 2002; Label: Universal, Mercury; Format: CD	8	—	—	—	—	—	—	—	—	—	ARIA: Platinum
2004	Original Sin: The Collection: Released: 21 September 2004; Label: Mercury; Format: CD	—	—	—	—	—	—	—	—	—	—	
2004	INXS²: The Remixes: Released: 2004; Label: Universal; Format: CD	91	—	—	—	—	—	—	—	—	—	
2006	Taste It: The Collection: Released: 2006; Label: Mercury; Format: CD	—	—	—	—	—	—	—	—	—	—	
2010	Platinum: Greatest Hits + Seriously Live: Released: 2010; Label: Petrol Electric; Format: CD, download	21	61	—	—	—	—	—	—	—	—	
2011	The Very Best: Released: 21 October 2011; Label: UMA; Format: CD, download	1	—	—	—	—	1	—	—	69	—	ARIA: 8× Platinum; RMNZ: Platinum; BPI: Gold
"—" denotes releases that did not chart or were not released in that country.

== As featured on ==
Year	Album
2019	Mystify: A Musical Journey with Michael Hutchence: Released: 5 July 2019
2021	Original Sin – The Seven Sins: Released: 16 July 2021

== Box sets ==
Year	Album
2011	Remastered: Released: 30 May 2011; Label: Universal; Format: CD
2014	All the Voices: Released: 1 September 2014; Label: UMC; Format: LP

== Extended plays ==
Year	Album	AUS	US
1983	Dekadance: Released: September 1983; Label: Atco; Format: Cassette, vinyl	2	148
1993	Get Out of the House: Released: 1993; Label: Format: CD	—	—
1997	Live in Aspen: February 1997: Released: 1997; Label: Mercury; Format: CD	—	—
2004	Bang the Drum: Released: 17 August 2004; Label: Island Def Jam Music Group; Format: Download	—	—
2008	Six Pack: Released: December 2008; Label: Self-released; Format: CD	—	—
"—" denotes releases that did not chart or were not released in that country.

== Singles ==
Year	Single	Peak chart positions									Certifications	Album
Year	Single	AUS	CAN	GER	NLD	NZ	UK	US	US Main	US Alt	Certifications	Album
1980	"Simple Simon"	—	—	—	—	—	—	—	—	—		non-album single
1980	"Just Keep Walking"	38	—	—	—	—	—	—	—	—		INXS
1981	"The Loved One"	18	—	—	—	—	—	—	—	—		non-album single
1981	"Stay Young"	21	—	—	—	—	—	—	—	—		Underneath the Colours
1982	"Night of Rebellion"	—	—	—	—	—	—	—	—	—		Underneath the Colours
1982	"Underneath the Colours"	—	—	—	—	—	—	—	—	—		Underneath the Colours
1982	"The One Thing"	14	31	—	—	—	—	30	2	—		Shabooh Shoobah
1982	"Don't Change"	14	—	—	—	—	—	80	17	—	ARIA: Gold; RMNZ: Gold	Shabooh Shoobah
1983	"To Look at You"	36	—	—	—	—	—	—	—	—		Shabooh Shoobah
1983	"Black and White"	24	—	—	—	—	—	—	—	—		Shabooh Shoobah
1983	"Original Sin"	1	20	—	31	6	163	58	43	—	RMNZ: Gold	The Swing
1984	"I Send a Message"	3	—	—	—	18	—	77	41	—		The Swing
1984	"Burn for You"	3	—	—	—	29	—	—	—	—		The Swing
1984	"Dancing on the Jetty"	39	—	—	—	—	—	—	—	—		The Swing
1985	"What You Need"	2	21	—	—	14	51	5	3	—		Listen Like Thieves
1985	"This Time"	19	—	—	—	40	79	81	11	—		Listen Like Thieves
1986	"Kiss the Dirt (Falling Down the Mountain)"	15	—	—	—	42	54	—	24	—		Listen Like Thieves
1986	"Listen Like Thieves"	28	—	—	—	—	46	54	12	—		Listen Like Thieves
1987	"Good Times" (Jimmy Barnes and INXS)	2	74	—	—	1	18	47	3	—	RMNZ: Gold	The Lost Boys: Original; Motion Picture Soundtrack
1987	"Need You Tonight"	3	2	16	12	3	2	1	1	—	ARIA: Gold; RMNZ: 3× Platinum; BPI: Platinum	Kick
1987	"New Sensation"	9	1	35	14	16	25	3	8	—	RMNZ: 2× Platinum; BPI: Silver	Kick
1988	"Devil Inside"	6	3	33	41	2	47	2	2	—	RMNZ: Gold	Kick
1988	"Never Tear Us Apart"	11^{[*]}	2	66	9	21	24	7	5	28	ARIA: 7× Platinum; RMNZ: 4× Platinum; BPI: Platinum	Kick
1988	"Kick"	—	—	—	—	—	—	—	33	—		Kick
1989	"Mystify"	—	41	46	53	—	14	—	17	—	RMNZ: Platinum; BPI: Silver	Kick
1990	"Suicide Blonde"	2	1	23	9	1	11	9	1	1	ARIA: Gold; RMNZ: Gold; RIAA: Gold	X
1990	"Disappear"	23	1	43	15	25	21	8	6	10		X
1991	"Bitter Tears"	36	13	—	34	44	30	46	4	6		X
1991	"By My Side"	23	54	56	35	—	42	—	—	—	RMNZ: Gold	X
1991	"The Stairs"	—	—	—	—	—	—	—	—	—		X
1991	"Shining Star"	21	28	—	40	—	27	—	14	4		Live Baby Live
1992	"Heaven Sent"	13	39	47	32	—	31	—	4	2		Welcome to Wherever You Are
1992	"Baby Don't Cry"	30	—	—	46	34	20	—	—	—		Welcome to Wherever You Are
1992	"Taste It"	36	39	—	—	31	21	101	—	5		Welcome to Wherever You Are
1992	"Not Enough Time"	—	7	—	—	—	—	28	13	2		Welcome to Wherever You Are
1993	"Beautiful Girl"	34	9	54	—	50	23	46	—	10	RMNZ: Platinum	Welcome to Wherever You Are
1993	"The Gift"	16	58	—	—	38	11	—	—	6		Full Moon, Dirty Hearts
1993	"Please (You Got That ...)"	37	90	—	—	46	50	—	—	—		Full Moon, Dirty Hearts
1993	"Time"	36	51	—	—	—	—	—	—	25		Full Moon, Dirty Hearts
1994	"Freedom Deep"	111	—	—	—	—	—	—	—	—		Full Moon, Dirty Hearts
1994	"The Strangest Party (These Are the Times)"	34	77	—	—	—	15	—	—	—		The Greatest Hits
1995	"Original Sin" (remix)	—	—	—	—	—	—	—	—	—		The Greatest Hits
1997	"Elegantly Wasted"	48	1	72	90	—	20	—	37	13		Elegantly Wasted
1997	"Everything"	159	—	—	—	—	71	—	—	—		Elegantly Wasted
1997	"Don't Lose Your Head"	94	—	—	—	—	—	—	—	—		Elegantly Wasted
1997	"Searching"	—	—	—	—	—	—	—	—	—		Elegantly Wasted
2001	"Precious Heart" (Tall Paul vs. INXS)	27	30	—	—	—	14	—	—	—		INXS^{2}: The Remixes
2001	"I'm So Crazy" (Par-T-One vs. INXS)	45	—	—	—	—	19	—	—	—		INXS^{2}: The Remixes
2002	"Tight"	80	—	—	93	—	—	—	—	—		The Best of INXS / Definitive
2003	"One of My Kind" (Rogue Traders vs. INXS)	10	—	—	—	—	—	—	—	—		INXS^{2}: The Remixes
2003	"I Get Up"	72	—	—	—	—	—	—	—	—		non-album single
2004	"Bang the Drum"	—	—	—	—	—	—	—	—	—		non-album single
2004	"Mystify" (remix) (Mellow Trax featuring INXS)	—	—	74	—	—	—	—	—	—		non-album single
2004	"Dream on Black Girl (Original Sin)" (Kash vs. INXS)	—	—	—	—	—	—	—	—	—		non-album single
2005	"Pretty Vegas"	9	2	—	—	7	—	37	—	—	MC: Gold; RIAA: Gold	Switch
2006	"Afterglow"	24	3	—	—	—	—	—	—	—		Switch
2006	"Devil's Party"	—	—	—	—	—	—	—	—	—		Switch
2006	"Perfect Strangers"	—	—	—	—	—	—	—	—	—		Switch
2006	"God's Top Ten"	—	88	—	—	—	—	—	—	—		Switch
2010	"Never Tear Us Apart (2010)" (featuring Ben Harper and Mylène Farmer)	—	—	—	—	—	—	—	—	—		Original Sin
2011	"Don't Change (2011)"	—	—	—	—	—	—	—	—	—		Original Sin
2011	"Mediate" (featuring Tricky)	—	—	—	—	—	—		—	—		Original Sin
2019	"Please (You Got That...)" (re-release)	—	—	—	—	—	—	—	—	—		Mystify: A Musical Journey with Michael Hutchence
2023	"Just Keep Walking" (Sgt Slick v INXS)	—	—	—	—	—	—	—	—	—		non album single
"—" denotes releases that did not chart or were not released in that country

Notes

- * When "Never Tear Us Apart" was first released in 1988, it originally peaked at number 14 in Australia. After the airing of the 2014 miniseries INXS: Never Tear Us Apart, the single charted again in Australia and ended up surpassing its original peak, this time peaking at number 11.

== Other appearances ==
- Pretty in Pink: Original Motion Picture Soundtrack (1 song) (1986)
- Crocodile Dundee (1 song featured in movie though only appeared on the "Special Edition" of soundtrack) (1986)
- The Lost Boys: Original Motion Picture Soundtrack (2 songs) (1987)
- Reckless Kelly Soundtrack (1 song, "Born to Be Wild") (1993)
- Beverly Hills Cop III: Original Motion Picture Soundtrack (1 song) (1994)
- Donnie Darko: Original Motion Picture Soundtrack (1 song) (2001)

== Videography ==
=== Video albums ===
Title	Album details	Certifications (sales threshold)
The Swing and Other Stories	Release date: 1985; Label: PolyGram; Formats: VHS	AUS: Platinum
What You Need	Release date: 1986; Label: Atlantic; Formats: VHS	
Living INXS	Release date: 1986; Label: Picture Music International; Formats: VHS, LD	ARIA: Platinum
Kick the Video Flick	Release date: 1987; Label: Warner Music Group; Format: VHS, LD	ARIA: Platinum; BPI: Platinum
In Search of Excellence	Release date: 1989; Label: PolyGram; Format: VHS, LD	ARIA: Platinum
Greatest Video Hits (1980–1990)	Release date: 31 October 1990; Label: Truism; Format: VHS, LD	RIAA: Gold
Live Baby Live	Release date: 1991; Label: A. Vision Entertainment; Format: LD	
Australian Made	Release date: 1992; Label: Warner Music Vision; Format: VHS	
The Great Video Experience	Release date: 1994; Label: PolyGram; Format: VHS, LD	
Live Baby Live	Release date: 2003; Label: Mercury; Format: DVD, UMD	ARIA: 3× Platinum
The Years 1979–1997	Release date: 2003; Label: Mercury; Format: DVD	
I'm Only Looking – The Best of INXS	Release date: 13 July 2004; Label: Mercury; Format: DVD	ARIA: 2× Platinum
Rock Star: INXS	Release date: 11 July 2005; Label: CBS Records; Format: DVD	MC: Platinum; RIAA: Gold
Live Baby Live Wembley Stadium	Release date: 26 June 2020 (worldwide); Label: Eagle Rock Entertainment; Format: DVD, Blu-ray, Ultra HD Blu-ray	

=== Music videos ===
Year	Title	Director	Album
1980	"Just Keep Walking"	Gary Page	INXS
1981	"The Loved One"	Peter Cox	non-album
1981	"Stay Young"	Peter Clifton	Underneath the Colours
1982	"The One Thing"	Soren Jensen	Shabooh Shoobah
1982	"Don't Change"	Scott Hicks	Shabooh Shoobah
1983	"To Look at You"	Scott Hicks	Shabooh Shoobah
1983	"Original Sin" (2 versions)	Yamamoto San	The Swing
1983	"I Send a Message"	Yamamoto San	The Swing
1984	"Burn for You"	Richard Lowenstein	The Swing
1984	"All the Voices"	Richard Lowenstein	The Swing
1984	"Dancing on the Jetty"	Richard Lowenstein	The Swing
1985	"What You Need"	Lynn-Maree Milburn	Listen Like Thieves
1985	"This Time"	Peter Sinclair	Listen Like Thieves
1985	"Kiss the Dirt (Falling Down the Mountain)"	Alex Proyas	Listen Like Thieves
1985	"Listen Like Thieves"	Richard Lowenstein	Listen Like Thieves
1987	"Good Times" (with Jimmy Barnes)	Joel Schumacher	The Lost Boys: Original Motion Picture Soundtrack
1987	"Need You Tonight/Mediate"	Richard Lowenstein	Kick
1987	"New Sensation"	Richard Lowenstein	Kick
1988	"Guns in the Sky"	Richard Lowenstein	Kick
1988	"Devil Inside"	Joel Schumacher	Kick
1988	"Never Tear Us Apart"	Richard Lowenstein	Kick
1989	"Mystify"	Richard Lowenstein	Kick
1990	"Suicide Blonde"	Richard Lowenstein	X
1990	"Disappear"	Claudia Castle	X
1991	"Bitter Tears"	Richard Lowenstein	X
1991	"By My Side"	Richard Lowenstein	X
1992	"Heaven Sent"	Richard Lowenstein	Welcome to Wherever You Are
1992	"Baby Don't Cry"	Paul Boyd	Welcome to Wherever You Are
1992	"Taste It"	Richard Lowenstein	Welcome to Wherever You Are
1992	"Not Enough Time"	Howard Greenhalgh	Welcome to Wherever You Are
1993	"Beautiful Girl"	Mark Pellington	Welcome to Wherever You Are
1993	"The Gift"	Richard Lowenstein	Full Moon, Dirty Hearts
1993	"Cut Your Roses Down"	Richard Lowenstein	Full Moon, Dirty Hearts
1993	"Please (You Got That ...)"	Lucinda Clutterbuck	Full Moon, Dirty Hearts
1994	"The Strangest Party (These Are the Times)"	Big TV! and Monty Whitebloom	The Greatest Hits
1997	"Elegantly Wasted"	Walter Stern	Elegantly Wasted
1997	"Everything"	Paul Boyd	Elegantly Wasted
1997	"Don't Lose Your Head"	Nick Egan	Elegantly Wasted
1997	"Searching"	Nick Egan	Elegantly Wasted
2005	"Pretty Vegas"	Scott Duncan	Switch
2006	"Afterglow"	Scott Duncan	Switch
2006	"Perfect Strangers"		Switch
2017	"Kick"	Steve Hanft	Kick 30

== Featured ==
Type	Title	Song
Film	Reckless	"The One Thing"
Film	Reckless	"To Look at You"
Film	The Lost Boys	"Good Times"
Film	Reckless	"Soul Mistake"
Film	Beverly Hills Cop III	"Keep the Peace"
Film	Donnie Darko: The Director's Cut	"Never Tear Us Apart"
Film	40 Days and 40 Nights	"New Sensation"
Film	Coyote Ugly	"Need You Tonight"
Film	Crocodile Dundee	"Different World"
Film	Face/Off	"Don't Lose Your Head"
Film	Hysterical Blindness	"What You Need"
Film	In the Land of Women	"Beautiful Girl"
Film	Mystery Date	"Disappear"
Film	Mystery Date	"On My Way"
Film	Mystery Date	"Suicide Blonde"
Film	Pretty in Pink	"Do Wot You Do"
Film	Shattered Glass	"New Sensation"
Film	Rock Star	"Devil Inside"
Film	Reckless Kelly	"Born to Be Wild"
Film	Drop Zone	"Strangest Party (These Are the Times)"
Film	Towelhead	"New Sensation"
Film	Adventureland	"Don't Change"
Film	Young Guns 3	"Don't Change"
Film	Hot Tub Time Machine	"What You Need"
Film	Love & Other Drugs	"Beautiful Girl"
TV show	American Dad!	"Never Tear Us Apart"
TV show	‘’Lucifer’’	“Devil Inside”
TV show	One Tree Hill	"Never Tear Us Apart"
TV show	The Mick	"The One Thing"
Ad	Chevy Trucks	"What You Need"
Ad	NRMA Insurance	"By My Side"
Ad	McDonald's	"New Sensation"
Ad	Toyota	"New Sensation"
Ad	Schlitterbahn	"New Sensation"
Game	Grand Theft Auto: Vice City	"Kiss the Dirt"
Game	Grand Theft Auto: Vice City Stories	"The One Thing"
Game	Grand Theft Auto V (re-release)	"New Sensation"
Game	FIFA Football 2005	"What You Need"
Game	Name That Tune Eighties	"Need You Tonight"
Game	Name That Tune Eighties	"New Sensation"
Game	Name That Tune Eighties	"Never Tear Us Apart"
Game	Name That Tune Eighties	"What You Need"
Game	Rock Band 3	"Need You Tonight"
Game	Rocksmith+	"Original Sin"

== See also ==
- Music of Australia
