= The Years 1979–1997 =

Greatest hits album by INXS
- Released: 10 December 2002
- Recorded: Various
- Genre: Rock
- Label: Universal
- Producer: Various

INXS chronology
Definitive INXS (2002)	The Years 1979–1997 (2002)	INXS²: The Remixes (2004)

The Years 1979–1997 is a greatest hits compilation released by Australian rock band INXS on 10 December 2002. It is roughly the Australian equivalent of the American double-disc retrospective, Shine Like It Does: The Anthology (1979–1997), although it substitutes out several tracks that appeared on the American compilation (including the band's very first single, "Simple Simon" and its B-side "We Are the Vegetables"; tracks from the America-only release, Dekadance (consisting of remixed songs from the Shabooh Shoobah album); and several of the band's soundtrack contributions such as the duet with Jimmy Barnes, "Good Times") in favor of later tracks like "By My Side" and "Baby Don't Cry" and full-length versions of many songs that only appeared in their single versions on the American release. This album also includes two previously unreleased tracks ("Tight" and "Salvation Jane"), which were not featured on Shine Like It Does.

Professional ratings
Review scores
Source	Rating
AllMusic	link

== Track listing ==
=== Disc one ===
1. "Just Keep Walking"
2. "The Loved One"
3. "Stay Young"
4. "The One Thing"
5. "Don't Change"
6. "To Look at You"
7. "Original Sin"
8. "I Send a Message"
9. "Burn for You"
10. "Dancing on the Jetty"
11. "This Time"
12. "What You Need"
13. "Kiss the Dirt (Falling Down the Mountain)"
14. "Listen Like Thieves"
15. "Shine Like It Does"
16. "Need You Tonight"
17. "Devil Inside"
18. "New Sensation"
19. "Mystify"
20. "Kick"
21. "Never Tear Us Apart"

=== Disc two ===
1. "Suicide Blonde"
2. "Disappear"
3. "Bitter Tears"
4. "By My Side"
5. "The Stairs"
6. "Shining Star"
7. "Heaven Sent"
8. "Taste It"
9. "Baby Don't Cry"
10. "Beautiful Girl"
11. "Not Enough Time"
12. "The Gift"
13. "Please (You Got That ...) "
14. "Time"
15. "The Strangest Party (These Are the Times)"
16. "Elegantly Wasted"
17. "Don't Lose Your Head"
18. "Searching" (Leadstation Radio Mix)
19. "Salvation Jane"
20. "Tight"

Disc 1:
Track 1 from INXS (1980)
Track 3 from Underneath the Colours (1981)
Tracks 4–6 from Shabooh Shoobah (1982)
Tracks 7–10 The Swing (1984)
Tracks 11–15 from Listen Like Thieves (1985)
Tracks 16–21 from Kick (1987)

Disc 2:
Tracks 1–4 from X (1990)
Tracks 5, 6 from Live Baby Live (1991)
Tracks 7–11 from Welcome to Wherever You Are (1992)
Tracks 12–14 from Full Moon, Dirty Hearts (1993)
Track 15 from Greatest Hits (1994)
Tracks 16–18 from Elegantly Wasted (1997)

OTHER TRACKS/NOTES:
Disc 1:
Track 2: "The Loved One" – Released as a single only, in 1981. (later appeared on the 1982 INXSIVE compilation)
Disc 2:
Track 18: "Searching" – Off the Elegantly Wasted album, was to be released as a single in late 1997, but these plans were cancelled following the death of Michael Hutchence.
Track 19: "Salvation Jane" – This track was recorded in December 1989 for the X album, but was never included on the album.
Track 20: "Tight" – This track was recorded in 1992 for the Welcome to Wherever You Are album, but was dropped. It was mixed by Randy Nicklaus for release.

== Certifications ==
Region	Certification	Certified units/sales
Australia (ARIA)	Platinum	70,000^{^}
^{^} Shipments figures based on certification alone.
