= Shine Like It Does: The Anthology (1979–1997) =

Compilation album by INXS
- Released: 5 June 2001
- Recorded: 1979–1997
- Genre: Rock,
- Length: Disc 1: 75:59; Disc 2: 78:49
- Label: Rhino/Atlantic
- Producer: Various

INXS chronology
INXS: Live in Aspen – February 1997 (1997)	Shine Like It Does: The Anthology (1979–1997) (2001)	The Best of INXS (2002)

Professional ratings
Review scores
Source	Rating
AllMusic	link
The Boston Globe	(favorable)
(The New)Rolling Stone Album Guide	3.5/5 stars
Southtown Star	5/5 stars
The State	4/4 stars
Tampa Bay Times	B+

Shine Like It Does: The Anthology (1979–1997) is a greatest hits compilation released by Australian rock band INXS on 5 June 2001. It features most of their singles, some remixes, and rare tracks heard for the first time on CD. To date, the album has sold 35,000 copies in the US.

Maxine McCaghy from "The Rough Guide To Rock" satisfyingly concluded, a great double - CD collection of singles and remixes." John Heidt of Vintage Guitar (magazine) wrote a positive review for the compilation, he insisted these Australian rockers made perfect pop/rock records that were laced with funk, soul, and R&B. He acknowledged the two discs have all the hits and more."

== Track listing ==
=== Disc one ===
1. "Simple Simon" – 2:34
2. "We Are the Vegetables" – 1:55
3. "Just Keep Walking" – 2:43
4. "The Loved One" – 3:38
5. "Stay Young" – 3:27
6. "The One Thing" – 3:24
7. "Don't Change" – 4:25
8. "To Look at You" (Single Edit) – 3:43
9. "Here Comes II" – 3:52
10. "Black and White" (Extended Version) – 4:57
11. "Original Sin" (featuring Daryl Hall) – 3:46
12. "I Send a Message" – 3:25
13. "Burn for You" (Single Remix) – 3:40
14. "Dancing on the Jetty" – 4:34
15. "This Time" – 3:08
16. "What You Need" – 3:35
17. "Kiss the Dirt (Falling Down the Mountain)" – 3:35
18. "Listen Like Thieves" – 3:48
19. "Shine Like It Does" – 3:05
20. "Different World" (7" mix) – 4:19
21. "Good Times" (with Jimmy Barnes) – 3:52

=== Disc two ===
1. "Need You Tonight" (Single edit) – 3:04
2. "Devil Inside" (Australian single edit) – 3:58
3. "New Sensation" – 3:41
4. "Never Tear Us Apart" – 3:06
5. "Mystify" – 3:18
6. "Kick" – 3:15
7. "Suicide Blonde" (7" mix) – 3:53
8. "Disappear" – 4:09
9. "Bitter Tears" – 3:54
10. "The Stairs" (live) – 5:04
11. "Heaven Sent" – 3:22
12. "Not Enough Time" (Barcelona LP fade) – 4:21
13. "Taste It" – 3:26
14. "Beautiful Girl" (Mendelsohn mix) – 3:11
15. "The Gift" – 4:05
16. "Please (You Got That ...)" (with Ray Charles) – 3:03
17. "The Strangest Party (These Are the Times)" – 3:56
18. "Elegantly Wasted" (radio edit) – 3:54
19. "Let It Ride" – 3:45
20. "Don't Lose Your Head" – 4:03
21. "Searching" (Leadstation radio edit) – 4:20

Disc 1

- Tracks 1–2 and 4 are from the INXSIVE (Compilation was released in 1982; songs were released in 1980 and 1981).
- Track 3 is from INXS (1980).
- Track 5 is from Underneath the Colours (1981).
- Tracks 6–10 are from Shabooh Shoobah (1982).
  - Tracks 9 and 10 are from the 1983 EP Dekadance, which consists of remixes of songs from Shabooh Shoobah
- Tracks 11–14 are from The Swing (1984).
- Tracks 15–19 are from Listen Like Thieves (1985).
- Track 20 is from the "Crocodile" Dundee soundtrack (1986).
- Track 21 is from The Lost Boys soundtrack (1987).

Disc 2

- Tracks 1–6 are from Kick (1987).
- Tracks 7–9 are from X (1990).
- Track 10 is from Live Baby Live (1991).
- Tracks 11–14 are from Welcome to Wherever You Are (1992).
- Tracks 15–16 are from Full Moon, Dirty Hearts (1993).
- Track 17 is from The Greatest Hits (1994).
- Tracks 18–21 are from Elegantly Wasted (1997).
  - Track 19 only appeared on the Japanese version of Elegantly Wasted, though it was also featured as the b-side for the song "Everything" from the same album
