= I'm Only Looking – The Best of INXS =

Best of INXS: I'm Only Looking

Video by INXS
- Released: 13 July 2004
- Recorded: 1980–1997
- Genre: Rock
- Label: Warner Strat. Mkt.
- Director: Clayton Jacobson, Alex Proyas, Baillie Walsh, Big T.V., Claudia Castle

I'm Only Looking is a two-disc compilation DVD by INXS. Disc one contains a number of official videos with commentaries for their most famous hits, and the second disc features a number of remastered live and studio rarities.

== Track listing ==
=== Disc one ===
1. "Just Keep Walking"
2. "The One Thing"
3. "Don't Change"
4. "Original Sin"
5. "This Time"
6. "What You Need"
7. "Kiss the Dirt (Falling Down the Mountain)"
8. "Listen Like Thieves"
9. "Need You Tonight"
10. "Mediate"
11. "Devil Inside"
12. "Never Tear Us Apart"
13. "New Sensation"
14. "Mystify"
15. "Suicide Blonde"
16. "Disappear"
17. "Bitter Tears"
18. "By My Side"
19. "Shining Star"
20. "Not Enough Time"
21. "Taste It"
22. "Baby Don't Cry"
23. "Beautiful Girl"
24. "The Gift"
25. "Elegantly Wasted"

=== Disc Two ===
Live/Rare & Documentary
INXS Live 1980–1997

1. "Simple Simon (Live Gold Coast 1980)"
2. "Original Sin (Live Narara 1984)"
3. "Listen Like Thieves(Live Rockin' The Royals, Melbourne 1985)"
4. "Kick (Live California 1988)"
5. "New Sensation (Live 1991)"
6. "Need You Tonight (Live Osaka 1994)"
7. "Mediate (Live Osaka 1994)"
8. "Searching (Live ARIA Awards Sydney 1996)"
9. "Elegantly Wasted (Live Rocks the Rockies, Aspen 1997)"
10. "Don't Change (Live Montage 1983-1997)"

ReMixed

1. "Suicide Blonde (Launay 12" Version)"
2. "The Stairs (7" single mix)"
3. "Bitter Tears (Lorimer 12" /Live Mix)"
4. "Disappear (Lorimer 12" Mix)"

Welcome to Wherever You Are

1. "Heaven Sent" (Live Montage)
2. Rehearsal / Recording Montage
3. "Taste It" (Live Montage)

Pictures from a Full Moon

1. "Time"
2. "Make Your Peace"
3. "I'm Only Looking"
4. "Please (You Got That...)"

Rare & Unreleased

1. "The One Thing (Live USA 1983)"
2. "The Strangest Party (These Are the Times)"
3. "Everything"
4. "Searching"
5. "Don't Lose Your Head"

"Behind the Scenes" documentary

Photo gallery
