= The Greatest Hits (INXS album) =

Greatest hits album by INXS
- Released: 31 October 1994
- Genres: Rock; alternative rock
- Label: East West
- Producer: Various

INXS chronology
| Full Moon, Dirty Hearts (1993) | The Greatest Hits (1994) | Elegantly Wasted (1997) |

Singles from The Greatest Hits
- 1. "The Strangest Party (These Are the Times)" Released: 10 October 1994

Professional ratings
Review scores
| Source | Rating |
|---|---|
| AllMusic | link |
| Music Week | 5/5 stars |
| NME | 5/10 |
| (The New) Rolling Stone Album Guide | 4/5 stars |
| Smash Hits | 4/5 stars |

The Greatest Hits is a greatest hits compilation released by Australian rock band INXS in 1994. The compilation was a chart success in Australia, peaking at number two, and in the UK, where it reached number three. It stalled at number 112 on the US Billboard 200; however, it was eventually certified platinum. The album included two new songs: "The Strangest Party (These Are the Times)" and "Deliver Me".

== Track listing ==
The Greatest Hits was originally released with different tracks in the UK, US, Australia, Brazil, and Mexico, and also as a limited edition release with All Juiced Up in the UK and Australia. Japan's release carried the US track listing, and all other nations received the UK track listing. The album was subsequently re-released in 1996 in Australia and in 1997 in Japan with the UK track listing.

=== UK track listing ===
Mercury (Catalogue # 526 230–2) – available in the UK since 1994, Australia since 1996 and Japan since 1997.

1. "Mystify"
2. "Suicide Blonde"
3. "Taste It"
4. "The Strangest Party (These Are the Times)"
5. "Need You Tonight"
6. "Original Sin"
7. "Heaven Sent"
8. "Disappear"
9. "Never Tear Us Apart"
10. "The Gift"
11. "Devil Inside"
12. "Beautiful Girl"
13. "Deliver Me"
14. "New Sensation"
15. "What You Need"
16. "Listen Like Thieves"
17. "Bitter Tears"
18. "Baby Don't Cry"

=== US track listing ===
Atlantic (Catalogue # 7-82622-2) – available in the US and Canada since 1994 and in Japan between 1994 and 1997.

1. "The One Thing"
2. "Original Sin"
3. "What You Need"
4. "Listen Like Thieves"
5. "Shine Like It Does"
6. "Need You Tonight"
7. "Devil Inside"
8. "New Sensation"
9. "Never Tear Us Apart"
10. "Suicide Blonde"
11. "Disappear"
12. "The Stairs"
13. "Heaven Sent"
14. "Beautiful Girl"
15. "The Strangest Party (These Are the Times)"
16. "Deliver Me"

=== Australian track listing ===
WEA (Catalogue # 45099-8388-2) – available in Australia between 1994 and 1996.

1. "Just Keep Walking"
2. "The Loved One"
3. "Don't Change"
4. "Original Sin"
5. "I Send a Message"
6. "Burn For You"
7. "What You Need"
8. "This Time"
9. "Kiss the Dirt (Falling Down the Mountain)"
10. "Listen Like Thieves"
11. "Need You Tonight"
12. "Mediate"
13. "Devil Inside"
14. "New Sensation"
15. "Never Tear Us Apart"
16. "Suicide Blonde"
17. "Disappear"
18. "Heaven Sent"
19. "The Gift"
20. "The Strangest Party (These Are the Times)"

=== Brazilian track listing ===
1. "Original Sin"
2. "What You Need"
3. "Need You Tonight"
4. "Devil Inside"
5. "New Sensation"
6. "Never Tear Us Apart"
7. "Suicide Blonde"
8. "Disappear"
9. "By My Side"
10. "Beautiful Girl"
11. "Heaven Sent"
12. "Please (You Got That...)"
13. "The Strangest Party (These Are the Times)"
14. "Deliver Me"

== All Juiced Up ==
A special edition of this compilation includes a bonus CD with remixes.

1. "Taste It" (Youth Accapella Mix)
2. "Cut Your Roses Down" (Sure Is Pure Mix)
3. "Suicide Blonde" (Milk Mix)
4. "Please (You Got That ...)" (E-Smoove Club Need Mix)
5. "Disappear" (Red Zone Mix)
6. "I'm Only Looking" (Morales Bad Yard Mix)
7. "Cut Your Roses Down" (Sure Dub Mix)
8. "What You Need" (Cold Cut Mix)
9. "Devil Inside" (12" Mix)

== Charts ==
=== Weekly charts ===
1994 weekly chart performance for The Greatest Hits
| Chart (1994) | Peak position |
|---|---|
| Australian Albums (ARIA) | 2 |
| Austrian Albums (Ö3 Austria) | 12 |
| Canadian Albums (RPM) | 55 |
| Dutch Albums (Album Top 100) | 25 |
| German Albums (Offizielle Top 100) | 9 |
| New Zealand Albums (RMNZ) | 2 |
| Swedish Albums (Sverigetopplistan) | 16 |
| Swiss Albums (Schweizer Hitparade) | 7 |
| UK Albums (Official Charts) | 3 |
| US Billboard 200 | 112 |

1995 weekly chart performance for The Greatest Hits
| Chart (1995) | Peak position |
|---|---|
| Belgian Albums (Ultratop Flanders) | 45 |
| Belgian Albums (Ultratop Wallonia) | 30 |

=== Year-end charts ===
1994 year-end chart performance for The Greatest Hits
| Chart (1994) | Position |
|---|---|
| Australian Albums (ARIA) | 22 |

1995 year-end chart performance for The Greatest Hits
| Chart (1995) | Position |
|---|---|
| Belgian Albums (Ultratop Wallonia) | 46 |

1998 year-end chart performance for The Greatest Hits
| Chart (1998) | Position |
|---|---|
| Australian Albums (ARIA) | 71 |

== Certifications ==
Certifications for The Greatest Hits
| Region | Certification | Certified units/sales |
|---|---|---|
| Argentina (CAPIF) | Platinum | 60,000^{^} |
| Australia (ARIA) | 2× Platinum | 140,000^{^} |
| Belgium (BRMA) | Gold | 25,000^{*} |
| France (SNEP) | 2× Gold | 200,000^{*} |
| Germany (BVMI) | Gold | 250,000^{^} |
| New Zealand (RMNZ) | Platinum | 15,000^{^} |
| Switzerland (IFPI Switzerland) | Gold | 25,000^{^} |
| United Kingdom (BPI) | Platinum | 300,000^{^} |
| United States (RIAA) | Platinum | 1,000,000^{^} |
Summaries
| Europe (IFPI) | 2× Platinum | 2,000,000^{*} |
^{*} Sales figures based on certification alone.^{^} Shipments figures based on certification alone.
