= INXS: Live at Barker Hangar =

Live album by INXS
- Released: 4 October 2005
- Recorded: 8 May 1993
- Genre: Rock
- Length: 80:04
- Label: Island Def Jam, Atlantic/Rhino
- Producer: Mark Opitz

INXS chronology
Original Sin – The Collection (2004)	INXS: Live at Barker Hangar (2005)	Switch (2005)

INXS: Live at Barker Hangar is a digital download-only live album by the Australian rock band INXS, released on 4 October 2005. It had been recorded at the band's performance on 8 May 1993 at the Barker Hangar at Santa Monica Airport in Southern California. INXS performed to a crowd of nearly 4,000; the concert had sold out in less than three minutes.

Radio network, Westwood One, broadcast the live gig. The music video for "Time", the group's third single from Full Moon, Dirty Hearts (November 1993), includes footage shot at the venue. The four B-side tracks from "Time" (maxi-single version) are from the same concert and appear on INXS: Live at Barker Hangar.

The group had undertaken the Australian leg of their Get out of the House Tour starting on 10 April 1993 with concerts in Perth followed by Sydney, Adelaide, Melbourne and Brisbane. That leg finished in early May and they travelled to San Francisco to commence their North American leg. The show at Barker Hangar was their second, they continued with gigs in Dallas, Chicago, Detroit, Toronto, Montreal, Boston, New York, Philadelphia and Atlanta. The group's European leg was from late May to the end of June.

Mark West of Strange Tales described the tour as "a back-to-basics affair, stripping everything down and benefitting greatly from a marketing campaign that played on it being a return to the 'pub tours' of old", they deliberately chose to perform "gigs in towns they’d never played before and in venues that were much smaller than they were used to".

In 2005 four different digital service providers offered the full album along with exclusive bonus material: iTunes, MSN, Yahoo!, and Real Rhapsody; each offered an additional exclusive track from the encore of the show which were "Time", "Bitter Tears", "Mystify" and "Don't Change", respectively.

At the band's request, a local cover band, Dread Zeppelin, opened the show and performed tracks from that group's third album, Hot & Spicy Beanburger (1993).

== Track listing ==
1. "Communication" – 5:19
2. "Days of Rust" – 3:03
3. "The Gift" – 4:04
4. "The Loved One" – 3:56
5. "Cut Your Roses Down" – 4:17
6. "Taste It" – 5:19
7. "Need You Tonight" – 3:18
8. "Mediate" – 4:17
9. "Full Moon, Dirty Hearts" – 3:53
10. "Please (You Got That...)" – 3:11
11. "Suicide Blonde" – 5:31
12. "I Send a Message" – 3:18
13. "All Around" – 3:17
14. "What You Need" – 5:20
15. "New Sensation" – 3:55
16. "Kick" – 3:25
17. "Devil Inside" – 5:56
18. "Heaven Sent" – 3:31
19. "Time" – 3:13
20. "The Messenger" – 4:35

== Personnel ==
INXS members

- Garry Gary Beers – bass guitar
- Andrew Farriss – keyboards, guitar
- Jon Farriss – percussion, drums
- Tim Farriss – guitar
- Michael Hutchence – vocals
- Kirk Pengilly – guitar, saxophone, vocals

Production work

- Mark Opitz – producer
