= INXS²: The Remixes =

Remix album by INXS
- Released: 26 April 2004
- Recorded: 1985–97, 2004
- Genre: Rock
- Label: Mercury/Universal Music Australia
- Producer: Various

INXS chronology
The Years 1979–1997 (2002)	INXS²: The Remixes (2004)	Original Sin – The Collection (2004)

INXS²: The Remixes or INXS Squared: The Remixes is a collection of remixes of tracks originally by Australian rock group INXS, which was released in April 2004 by Mercury Records/Universal Music Australia. It peaked in the ARIA Albums Chart top 100 and also reached No. 5 on the ARIA Dance Albums Chart. "Suicide Blonde" was remixed by Paul Oakenfold, "New Sensation" by The Beginnerz, and "The Strangest Party" by Apollo 440.

== Track listing ==
All songs performed by INXS unless otherwise stated

1. "Don't Lose Your Head" (Leadstation Solid Gold Mix)
2. "Bitter Tears" (Lorimer 12" Mix)
3. "Original Sin" (Epic Adventure)
4. "Precious Heart" – Tall Paul Vs. INXS
5. "New Sensation" (The Beginnerz Mix)
6. "Disappear" (Morales 12" Mix)
7. "One of My Kind" (Radio Edit) – Rogue Traders Vs. INXS
8. "Everything" (Jaxxclub Vocal)
9. "Tight" (the Automator Mix)
10. "I'm So Crazy" (Radio Edit) – Par-T-One Vs. INXS
11. "Suicide Blonde" (Oakenfold Milk Mix)
12. "The Strangest Party" (Apollo 440 Mix)
13. "Taste It" (Youth 12" Mix)
14. "What You Need" (Coldcut Force Mix 13 Edit)
15. "Searching" (Leadstation Radio Mix)
