= Original Sin – The Collection =

Compilation album by INXS
- Released: 21 September 2004
- Recorded: 1980–1987
- Genre: Rock, pop
- Length: 71:40
- Label: Mercury, Spectrum
- Producer: INXS, Duncan McGuire, Richard Clapton, Mark Opitz, Nile Rodgers, Nick Launay, Chris Thomas

INXS chronology
INXS²: The Remixes (2004)	Original Sin – The Collection (2004)	INXS: Live at Barker Hangar (2004)

Original Sin – The Collection is a compilation album by Australian rock band INXS released on 21 September 2004. It spans their earliest six studio albums INXS (1980), Underneath the Colours (1981), Shabooh Shoobah (1982), The Swing (1984), Listen Like Thieves (1985) and Kick (1987). It is not to be confused with their 2010 release, Original Sin, nor the single of the same name from 1984.

== Reception ==
Professional ratings
Review scores
Source	Rating
Allmusic	link

Allmusic's James Christopher Monger felt the album was "more of a sampler than a 'greatest-hits' package" which provides three tracks from each of their earliest six albums.

== Track listing ==
All tracks are written by Andrew Farriss and Michael Hutchence, except where noted

No.	Title	Length
1.	"Just Keep Walking" (Gary Beers, Andrew Farriss, Jon Farriss, Tim Farriss, Michael Hutchence, Kirk Pengilly)	2:44
2.	"In Vain" (Beers, A Farriss, J Farriss, T Farriss, Hutchence, Pengilly)	4:36
3.	"Learn to Smile" (Beers, A Farriss, J Farriss, T Farriss, Hutchence, Pengilly)	4:57
4.	"Underneath the Colours"	4:01
5.	"Horizons"	5:14
6.	"Barbarian" (Beers, A Farriss, J Farriss, T Farriss, Hutchence, Pengilly)	3:00
7.	"Don't Change" (Beers, A Farriss, J Farriss, T Farriss, Hutchence, Pengilly)	4:28
8.	"Spy of Love" (T Farriss, Hutchence)	3:51
9.	"Here Comes"	3:03
10.	"Original Sin"	5:20
11.	"Melting in the Sun" (J Farriss, T Farriss, Hutchence)	3:26
12.	"Johnson's Aeroplane" (A Farriss)	3:56
13.	"Listen Like Thieves" (Beers, A Farriss, Hutchence)	3:47
14.	"Same Direction"	4:58
15.	"Biting Bullets" (Hutchence, Pengilly)	2:51
16.	"Devil Inside"	5:13
17.	"Wild Life"	3:11
18.	"Calling All Nations"	3:04
