= INXS: Live in Aspen – February 1997 =

Live EP in Aspen February 1997

Live album by INXS
- Released: July 1997
- Recorded: February 1997
- Genre: Rock
- Length: 22:54
- Label: Mercury Records; Pollygram Aust. (Brashs)
- Producer: INXS

INXS chronology
Elegantly Wasted (1997)	Live EP in Aspen February 1997 (1997)	Shine Like It Does: The Anthology (1979–1997) (2001)

Professional ratings
Review scores
Source	Rating
Eil.com	(No Rating)
Imeem.com	5/5 stars

Live in Aspen is from Australian rock band INXS. Recorded live at the Wheeler Opera House in Aspen Colorado USA, it is now considered to be a rare 1997 Australian limited edition 6-track CD. It was released exclusively through Brashs Record Store following the release of the album Elegantly Wasted, and is the final release before the death of lead singer Michael Hutchence in November that same year.

== Track listing ==
1. "New Sensation"
2. "Elegantly Wasted"
3. "Searching"
4. "Need You Tonight"
5. "What You Need"
6. "Kick"

== Videos & Photos (external) ==
1. Need You Tonight
2. INXS Rock the Rockies pictures
