= INXSIVE =

Compilation album by INXS
- Released: 1982
- Recorded: 1980–82
- Genre: Rock
- Length: 48:19
- Label: Deluxe
- Producer: Richard Clapton; Duncan McGuire; INXS

INXS chronology
Underneath the Colours (1981)	INXSIVE (1982)	Shabooh Shoobah (1982)

INXSIVE is the first compilation album by Australian rock band INXS, which was released in 1982 on Deluxe Records for the Australian market only. It appeared in the top 100 of the Kent Music Report Albums Chart. INXSive features highlights from the band's first two studio albums, related B-sides, and two non-album singles: "Simple Simon" and "The Loved One". The latter is a cover of a 1966 single originally by The Loved Ones; INXS later re-recorded this song and released it on the album Kick (October 1987).

It was described by Australian musicologist, Ian McFarlane: "The budget-priced collection INXSive on Deluxe mopped up various album tracks and early singles sides". It completed the band's contract with DeLuxe prior to their move to WEA and PolyGram in hopes of greater worldwide exposure.

== Track listing ==
All tracks are written by INXS, except where noted.

Side one
No.	Title	Writer(s)	Length
1.	"Learn to Smile"		4:57
2.	"Wishy Washy"		3:50
3.	"Stay Young"	Andrew Farriss; Michael Hutchence	3:19
4.	"Prehistoria"	Kirk Pengilly	3:54
5.	"We Are the Vegetables"		1:53
6.	"Underneath the Colours"	Farriss; Hutchence	3:58
7.	"The Loved One"	Gavin Anderson; Gerry Humphreys; Ian H. Clyne; Kim Lynch; Robert John Lovett	3:07

Side two
No.	Title	Writer(s)	Length
8.	"The Unloved One"		2:54
9.	"Simple Simon"		2:32
10.	"Fair Weather Ahead"		4:20
11.	"In Vain"		4:35
12.	"Big Go Go"		3:12
13.	"Lacavocal"	Farriss; Hutchence	3:36
14.	"Just Keep Walking"		2:42
Total length:			48:19
