= Not Enough Time =

1992 single by INXS

Single by INXS

from the album Welcome to Wherever You Are
- B-side: "Light the Planet"; "Deepest Red"; "Firma Terror"; "In My Living Room"
- Released: August 1992
- Length: 4:20
- Label: Atlantic
- Songwriters: Andrew Farriss; Michael Hutchence
- Producers: Mark Opitz; INXS

INXS singles chronology
"Baby Don't Cry" (1992)	"Not Enough Time" (1992)	"Taste It" (1992)

"Not Enough Time" is a song by Australian rock band INXS, released in August 1992 by Atlantic Records, as the third single from their eighth studio album, Welcome to Wherever You Are (1992). The song was written by Andrew Farriss and Michael Hutchence; the music in Sydney and the lyrics in Paris, France. It was released simultaneously with "Baby Don't Cry", but only in the United States, Canada, and Japan. "Not Enough Time" peaked at numbers 23 and 28 on the US Cash Box Top 100 and Billboard Hot 100 charts, and number seven in Canada. The song also appears on the compilation album Barcelona Gold, released to coincide with the 1992 Summer Olympics.

== Composition ==
The lyrics to the song were originally intended for another composition from Welcome To Wherever You Are, which later became the album's opening song, "Questions". The original version can be heard on the 2002 remaster of the album. Australian singer Deni Hines appears as a backing vocalist on the song and went on to marry guitarist Kirk Pengilly a year later in 1993.

== Music video ==
The single's accompanying music video, directed by British director Howard Greenhalgh, premiered on NBC on 28 July 1992, when it was played alongside clips of that day's events from the 1992 Summer Olympics. The video was added to MTV's playlists on the week ending 8 August 1992.

== B-sides ==
The B-sides include a solo composition "Firma Terror" from bassist Gary Beers, another by lead guitarist Kirk Pengilly titled "Light the Planet", and "Deepest Red", an out-take from the X album.

== Track listings ==
- US CD single
1. "Not Enough Time" (Barcelona LP fade) – 4:20
2. "Light the Planet" – 2:50
- US maxi-CD single
1. "Not Enough Time" (Barcelona LP fade) – 4:20
2. "Deepest Red" – 3:20
3. "Firma Terror" – 3:05
4. "In My Living Room" – 3:54
- US cassette single
1. "Not Enough Time" (Barcelona LP fade)
2. "Deepest Red"
- Japanese mini-CD single
1. "Not Enough Time"
2. "Light the Planet"

== Charts ==
=== Weekly charts ===
Chart (1992)	Peak position
Canada Top Singles (RPM)	7
US Billboard Hot 100	28
US Alternative Airplay (Billboard)	2
US Mainstream Rock Airplay (Billboard)	13
US Pop Airplay (Billboard)	17
US Cash Box Top 100	23

=== Year-end charts ===
Chart (1992)	Position
Brazil (Crowley)	52
Canada Top Singles (RPM)	45
US Modern Rock Tracks (Billboard)	14

== Release history ==
Region	Date	Format(s)	Label(s)	Ref.
United States	August 1992	CD; cassette	Atlantic	
Japan	25 October 1992	Mini-CD	EastWest	
