= Simple Simon (song) =

1980 single by INXS

Single by INXS
- B-side: "We Are the Vegetables"
- Released: May 1980
- Recorded: 1980
- Studio: Trafalgar Studios
- Genre: New wave
- Length: 2:32
- Label: Deluxe
- Songwriters: Garry Gary Beers, Andrew Farriss, Jon Farriss, Tim Farriss, Michael Hutchence
- Producer: Martin Hannett (Annandale, New South Wales)

INXS singles chronology
"Simple Simon" (1980)	"Just Keep Walking" (1980)

"Simple Simon" is the debut single by Australian rock band INXS, released in May 1980 via Deluxe Records.

== Background ==
The title track was co-written by five of the group's members, Garry Gary Beers, Andrew Farriss, Jon Farriss, Tim Farriss and Michael Hutchence. The B-side, "We Are the Vegetables", was co-written by A Farriss, J Farriss, T Farriss, Hutchence and Kirk Pengilly. This title refers to an early band name, the Vegetables, which they used when performing in Perth in 1978.

Besides Australia the single was released in France (via RCA Victor). It was not included on the band's first album, INXS, which was issued in October 1980 but appeared on a compilation album, INXSIVE, in 1982.

The song is heavily influenced by ska and punk styles.

== Track listing ==
1. "Simple Simon" (Garry Gary Beers, Andrew Farriss, Jon Farriss, Tim Farriss, Michael Hutchence) – 2:32
2. "We Are the Vegetables" (A Farriss, J Farriss, T Farriss, Hutchence, Kirk Pengilly) – 1:53
