= Baby Don't Cry (INXS song) =

1992 single by INXS

Single by INXS

from the album Welcome to Wherever You Are
- Released: 10 August 1992
- Genre: Pop
- Length: 4:54
- Label: EastWest
- Songwriter: Andrew Farriss
- Producer: Mark Opitz

INXS singles chronology
"Heaven Sent" (1992)	"Baby Don't Cry" (1992)	"Not Enough Time" (1992)

"Baby Don't Cry" is the second single released from Australian rock band INXS's eighth studio album, Welcome to Wherever You Are (1992). It was written by Andrew Farriss about his daughter, Grace. The single was released only in Europe and Australia by East West Records.

Incorporating the 60-piece Australian Concert Orchestra, the song reached number 20 in the United Kingdom, number 30 in Australia and Belgium, number 34 in New Zealand, and number 46 in the Netherlands. In 1993, the song's engineer, Niven Garland, was nominated for Engineer of the Year at the 1993 ARIA Music Award for his work on "Baby Don't Cry", "Heaven Sent", and "Taste It".

== Background ==
The song was written by Andrew Farriss about his daughter, Grace. Farriss said in a December 2001 interview with Debbie Kruger for the Australasian Performing Right Association:

On the following album, Welcome to Wherever You Are, I just had the birth of my first daughter, Grace, and I was very much realising that life had changed for me dramatically because I became a parent and I’d just gone that next step in my life. I was writing lyrics like "Baby Don't Cry" and "Beautiful Girl’ and lyrics just about how wonderful it is to have something else in your life besides yourself to worry about and think about. So I began to have some interesting conversations with Michael, where he was still interested in writing fairly dark introspective lyrics, and I was trying to write very positive happy songs at a point in my life.

== Accolades ==
In 1993, the song's engineer, Niven Garland, was nominated for Engineer of the Year at the 1993 ARIA Music Award for his work on "Baby Don't Cry", "Heaven Sent", and "Taste It".

== Track listings ==
- Australian CD and cassette single
1. "Baby Don't Cry"
2. "Questions"
3. "Ptar Speaks"
4. "Baby Don't Cry" (vocal and orchestra mix)
- UK 7-inch and cassette single
1. "Baby Don't Cry"
2. "Questions" (instrumental)
- UK CD single and Dutch 12-inch single
1. "Baby Don't Cry"
2. "Questions" (instrumental)
3. "Ptar Speaks"
4. "Baby Don't Cry" (vocal and orchestra mix)

== Charts ==
=== Weekly charts ===
Chart (1992)	Peak position
Australia (ARIA)	30
Belgium (Ultratop 50 Flanders)	30
Europe (Eurochart Hot 100)	59
Netherlands (Dutch Top 40 Tipparade)	3
Netherlands (Single Top 100)	46
New Zealand (Recorded Music NZ)	34
UK Singles (Official Charts)	20
UK Airplay (Music Week)	7

=== Year-end charts ===
Chart (1992)	Position
UK Airplay (Music Week)	72

== Release history ==
Region	Date	Format(s)	Label(s)	Ref.
Australia	10 August 1992	CD; cassette	EastWest	
United Kingdom	24 August 1992	7-inch vinyl; CD; cassette	Mercury	
