= Welcome to Wherever You Are =

Studio album by INXS
- Released: 3 August 1992
- Recorded: 1991–1992
- Studio: Rhinoceros (Sydney)
- Genre: Alternative rock; dance-rock; pop rock
- Length: 45:49
- Label: EastWest; Atlantic; Mercury
- Producer: Mark Opitz, INXS

INXS chronology
Live Baby Live (1991)	Welcome to Wherever You Are (1992)	Full Moon, Dirty Hearts (1993)

Singles from Welcome to Wherever You Are
- 1. "Heaven Sent" Released: 22 June 1992; 2. "Baby Don't Cry" Released: August 1992 (AUS); 3. "Not Enough Time" Released: August 1992 (US); 4. "Taste It" Released: 2 November 1992; 5. "Beautiful Girl" Released: 1 February 1993

Welcome to Wherever You Are is the eighth studio album by Australian rock band INXS, which was released on 3 August 1992. With grunge and alternative music breaking into the mainstream, INXS tried to establish a new direction for itself, incorporating sitars, a 60-piece orchestra, and a much more "raw" sound to their music. In its four-star review of the album, Q called it "... a far more engaging and heartfelt collection than anything the group has put out in recent memory ... It rocks," and listed it as one of the 50 Best Albums of 1992. It was the first album by an Australian group to debut on the UK Albums Chart at number one since AC/DC's Back in Black, released in 1980.

Despite the positive critical reception, along with charting well on most countries' album charts (including topping the UK chart and reaching number two in Australia), the album marked a commercial decline for the band, especially in the United States, where it only peaked at number 16 on the Billboard 200 album chart. The commercial decline was partially due to the lack of promotion by their label and changing musical tastes towards grunge and alternative. Also hurting promotions, the band elected to take a break and not tour in support of the album. The plan was that the band would instead record the follow-up (which went on to become 1993's Full Moon, Dirty Hearts) and then tour in support of both albums. The downside of this, however, was that Welcome to Wherever You Are faded from press and public attention more quickly, and, as a result, failed to match the success of INXS's two previous albums, Kick and X.

While the single "Baby Don't Cry" was a Top 20 hit in the UK, the album's biggest American hit was "Not Enough Time", which reached No. 2 on the Billboard Modern Rock Tracks chart and stayed there for five consecutive weeks.

In 2002, a remastered version of the album was released, which included five previously unreleased tracks.

== Background ==
Following the release of their seventh studio album, X, INXS staged a worldwide concert tour titled the X-Factor Tour. The ten-month tour began in October 1990 and consisted of four legs with a total of 121 shows. The 1990–91 tour proved successful, attracting 1.2 million fans across four continents. To coincide with the successful tour, INXS released their first live album, Live Baby Live, a few months after the tour had finished. Live Baby Live features 15 live tracks taken from various shows during the band's Summer XS leg of the tour. Although the album was commercially successful, peaking in the top 10 on both the Australian and UK Albums Chart, as well as earning platinum status in the United States, some critics criticised the album for sounding too studio-like.

The members of INXS began preparations for their eighth studio album towards the end of the X tour. Songwriter and multi-instrumentalist Andrew Farriss had already written a number of songs while the band was on the road, including "Shining Star", which was quickly recorded and added to the Live Baby Live album as a bonus studio track. Once the band got back to Australia, the song-writing duo of Farriss and vocalist Michael Hutchence paired up to begin writing new material. Rehearsals for Welcome to Wherever You Are soon took place at the Sydney Opera House in Sydney.

== Recording and production ==
In November 1991, INXS entered Rhinoceros studios in Sydney to begin work on their eighth studio album. With no time constraints and enough money to make new studio recordings, the band members continued writing new material and experimenting with new sounds. Having worked with producer Chris Thomas previously on Listen Like Thieves, Kick and X, the band chose to work with Australian producer Mark Opitz, who was behind the production of the band's third studio album, Shabooh Shoobah, ten years earlier. For this album, INXS decided to shift their musical direction by incorporating a much "rawer" sound. To achieve this, a variety of techniques were used during production, such as stripping down the polished sound that was present on their previous albums with Thomas. Heavy distortion was used on the guitars. Opitz and Hutchence also used heavy distortion on the vocals, an experience that Hutchence enjoyed. In a 1992 radio interview promoting the release of Welcome to Wherever You Are, guitarist Tim Farriss recalls the same technique used in producing music in the 1960s: "Sometimes they used to mix the vocal back so the band would sound louder, punchier and harder".

The album includes the work and sound of the Australian Concert orchestra on the songs "Baby Don't Cry" and "Men and Women". The band recorded both tracks live in the studio, with the 60-piece orchestra being conducted by Colin Piper and engineered by Neil Sandbach. For the opening track "Questions", guitarist and saxophonist Kirk Pengilly used a brass horn to create a Far East sound. Australian singer Deni Hines was hired to provide backing vocals on one of the album's singles, "Not Enough Time", and the track "Strange Desire". The singer would go on to marry Pengilly one year later. Tim Farriss was absent during most of the album's production because he was suffering from exostosis. Pengilly had to play most of his material. Pengilly himself was recovering from the end of a ten-year relationship. Other band members were also going through eventful experiences in their lives, including drummer Jon Farriss, who was preparing to marry his girlfriend at the time, Leslie Bega, whom he had met the previous year in Los Angeles. Bassist Garry Gary Beers and his then-wife, Jodie, were awaiting the birth of their second child. In the band's 2005 official autobiography, INXS: Story to Story, Optiz recalls, "The album is very much Andrew, Michael and myself. We didn't have everyone's minds on the job because some of them were going through significant things in their personal lives".

In the midst of recording, the band were approached to headline the Concert for Life, a benefit show staged in Sydney's Centennial Park on 28 March 1992. The event was held to help raise money for the Victor Chang Cardiac Research Centre and AIDS Patient Services and Research, at St Vincent's Hospital. More than 62,000 people attended the event, with other Australian acts, including Crowded House and Jimmy Barnes headlining. For the encore, the orchestra were hired once again to help INXS perform their new song, "Baby Don't Cry", as well as "Never Tear Us Apart". The band included two more songs from the new album on their set list: "Taste It" and "All Around". Upon returning to the studio to finish the rest of the album, the band members decided not to tour in support for Welcome to Wherever You Are; instead they came up with the idea of doing a follow-up album, and then touring in support of both. Opitz went on to produce the follow-up, Full Moon, Dirty Hearts, a year later, continuing the band's experimentation with their musical style. Welcome to Wherever You Are is the first studio album to have all members of INXS share production credits.

== Composition ==
As a result of INXS' self-reinvention and intention to explore new musical directions, Welcome to Wherever You Are is the band's most experimental album, as apparent in the use of the 60-piece orchestra, instances of Middle Eastern instrumentation, "layers of distortion", female backing vocals and influences from baggy music ("Taste It") and melancholic songs from the Velvet Underground ("Beautiful Girl"). The album is eclectic in nature, with David Sinclair of Q noting that it strips back the production of its immediate predecessors to allow for "a variety of stylistic adventures of which you would hardly believe INXS to be capable." The music critic Ira Robbins says the album "shuffles the deck with samples, world music accents and surprising conceptual inversions, striking a mindful balance between ambition and common sense", while writer Manny Grillo says it "blends their usual funky dance rock with more alternative rock and world music textures", noting that the orchestra are employed both for anthemic ("Baby Don't Cry") and more serious ("Men and Women") effect. The record has also been called "dance-influenced".

Commenting on the band's new direction, Farriss stated: "In the past we've been a little too conscious of our song style, and we dropped that this time round." Hutchence commented, "Every band comes to a point where they let go. With albums, you're trying to attempt something over and over and get it right. Maybe you don't know when it is right and you go over that hill. We decided to knock it on the head and go into the studio to see what happens, see what we are, start again."

The album's eclectic, experimental direction is immediately apparent with the ethnic opening track, "Questions". A Middle Eastern-flavoured psychedelic song, it has been described as "a mystical Indian drone, peppered with exotic tabla rhythms and underpinned by synths and a drum machine". According to AllMusic: "From the start of the album, it's clear that INXS are out to confuse the standard perceptions of the band; the first instrument on the album is an Eastern-flavored horn." By contrast, "Heaven Sent" is a heavy, Iggy Pop-esque garage rock song, with Hutchence's snarling vocals distorted to sound as though they were sung through a megaphone. "Communication" is a stadium-friendly "tech satire", with lyrics referring to satellite dishes and "communication disinformation". It uses the studio as an instrument and features catchy guitar work. The baggy-adjacent "Taste It" is a groove-based track with an ambient, woolly drum sound.

"Not Enough Time" features a pulsating soul groove, with Sinclair comparing Hutchence's vocals to David Bowie, while "All Around" is a rock song reminiscent of the Beatles. The orchestrations on the anthemic, symphonic "Baby Don't Cry" are comparable to 1960s rock and soul music. Rather than using the orchestra for background shading, as is typical of orchestras on rock songs, INXS and Opitz "push it to the front of the mix, forcing the rock instruments to compete," resulting in a dense arrangement. The melancholic "Beautiful Girl" was inspired by the Velvet Underground and features a delicate melody. "Wishing Well" features a sinuous, bluesy bass line and Hammond organ parts, while "Back On Line" has been described as "an unlikely trip to the spacy land of psychedelia-tinged R&B." The record closes with "Men and Women", a bleak, largely beatless song featuring a murky sound comprising harsh guitar chugs, kettle drums and symphonic orchestration.

== Packaging ==
Previous designs for INXS releases, including Kick and X, were created by visual artist Nick Egan, and included strong shots of the band, but for the release of Welcome to Wherever You Are, INXS wanted to go for a more artistic and creative theme. A technique known as "situation photography" was used to shoot random pictures for the album's cover art, as well as the album's five singles. The album and its accompanying singles would all have the same font style and effect used for the title. The title is printed on a long, narrow piece of paper, and is coated onto the random photograph with adhesive tape.

Welcome to Wherever You Are features a different album cover on each format. The most recognised cover art is the design on CD, which features the Artane Boys Band from Ireland. Atlantic Records also released a limited edition of the album on deluxe digipak. The vinyl edition featured a black & white picture of a Sea Cadet while the cassette cover features a group of boy scouts from 9th/10th Dublin Aughrim Street Scouts performing a human pyramid. The new designs were a departure from the group's previous work with Egan. With INXS missing from the artwork and lack of promotion from the record label, some fans simply wouldn't recognise the new album in record stores. A few months after the album's release, Atlantic re-released the CD edition in Australia with new artwork, this time featuring INXS. The re-printed artwork shows the band walking the desert dressed in suits. The shot was an outtake taken from the photo sessions that were included in the album sleeve.

Lyrics from all twelve songs were printed in the liner notes.

== Critical reception ==
Professional ratings
Review scores
Source	Rating
AllMusic	3.5/5 stars
Chicago Tribune	2.5/4 stars
Encyclopedia of Popular Music	3/5 stars
The Great Rock Discography	6/10
MusicHound Rock	4/5
Q	4/5 stars
The Rolling Stone Album Guide	3/5 stars
Rolling Stone Germany	4.5/5 stars
Select	3/5 stars
Simi Valley Star	4/5 stars

The album was generally positively received by the critics and fans, particularly in Europe and the UK, where it went to the top of Albums Chart in the UK. Hutchence commented that the album received the best critical reaction for any of the band's work. The Independent and Q magazine also included the album in their top 10 albums of the year of 1992.

Andy Gill from The Independent said "It's their best record by some distance, bristling with pop hooks applied in odd directions." Billboard's Melinda Newman wrote that the album started a new phase in INXS' career, blending their love of 1960s pop and R&B with "its own uniquely quirky '90s sound", and praised it for displaying the band's diversity, while David Sinclair of Q opined that INXS' "mild experimentation" and "more enquiring approach to their music" resulted in "a far more engaging and heartfelt collection than anything the group has put out in recent memory." The Miami Herald's Howard Cohen noted the group's new direction, "balancing accessible pop ('Not Enough Time') with inventive excursions ('Questions')", adding that it is not until the chorus of the third song, "Communication", that the album sounds like INXS. Cohen wrote that the 60-piece orchestra on two unalike songs "helps make Welcome the most interesting outing yet from a band nearing its 15th year." NME's Nancy Culp was mixed in her review of the album. She Opined, As far as Inxs albums go, this is probably as good as can be grudgingly expected. But, sadly, artistic garlands might be a bit thin on the ground.'

However, Vic Garbarini, for Rolling Stone, was less positive and felt "this is music that attracts but hasn't the gravity or resonance to hold your attention ... Hutchence seems dissociated from his material, dispassionately competent ... the wealth of musical gifts on the album makes the one-dimensional delivery stand out all the more dramatically". Dave Morrison of Select complained that the album was not a full U2-style reinvention, but countered that INXS were better at "stadium stuff" than any other band. Sylvia Patterson of Smash Hits, Opined this release is thinker's rock for gurls (much better than the usual buffoon's rock for blokes). Ending her review with four out of five stars." Chicago Tribune felt the record was more ambitious than most INXS albums, due to its "Middle Eastern accents, full-blown orchestral pieces and even some distorted Hutchence vocals", but conceded that it largely comprised the "funky bass lines, scratchy rhythm guitars, wailing sax and atmospheric keyboards" that typified the band's sound. Dave Ferman of Fort Worth Star-Telegram wrote that INXS' strength remained in mixing funk, abrasive rock, and pop structures, but believed the "inventive, varied" CD balances songs like those with new touches, both in its instrumentation and drum sounds, and sharp songwriting.

Retrospectively, Ira Robbins of Trouser Press named it an "intriguingly good" departure for the band, adding "the results are uneven but sometimes genuinely rewarding." Writer Stephen Thomas Erlewine stated in his AllMusic review that the album was "one of the band's strongest", singling out the frequent use of "special recording effects and exotic rhythms and sounds". Both Maxine McCoghy of The Rough Guide to Rock (1999) and Martin C. Strong of The Great Rock Discography (2006) described the album as INXS' attempt to abandon the stadium rock genre for an experimental sound. For McCoghy, the resulting album is sometimes patchy, but shows the band's "admirable willingness" to "throw off their rock-god postures", while Strong, who noted the band had just outsold Wembley Stadium before recording Welcome to Wherever You Are, praised it as "a more ambitious and experimental record", highlighting "Beautiful Girl" for being "as good as anything the band have recorded to date."

In 2019 AllMusic's -Zac Johnson said, "Welcome To Wherever You Are is INXS' lesser-appreciated album from their late era, awarding several worthwhile tunes." Welcome To Wherever You Are was listed at #20 on Radio X (United Kingdom)'s 25 "Greatest" Indie Albums of 1992.

=== Commercial performance ===
At the time of its release, Welcome to Wherever You Are entered the UK Albums Chart at number one, making INXS the first Australian band to reach the top spot since AC/DC's Back in Black in 1980. The album was certified gold less than two months later by the British Phonographic Industry (BPI) for sales in excess of 100,000 units. The album charted well in other parts of Europe, reaching number one in Sweden, number two in Switzerland, number three in Norway and number eight in Germany. The album attained gold status in both Sweden and Switzerland.

In the band's native Australia, the album debuted on the Australian Albums Chart at number two on 16 August 1992 and remained at that position for two weeks. In total, it remained in the Australian charts for 13 weeks. It subsequently received a gold accreditation from the Australian Recording Industry Association (ARIA) for shipments of 35,000 units. In New Zealand, the album entered at number 46 on the RIANZ Chart, eventually peaking at number eight. It was present for a total of 12 weeks on the chart.

In the United States, Welcome to Wherever You Are peaked at number 16 on the Billboard 200, and was first certified gold by the Recording Industry Association of America (RIAA) on 2 October 1992 for shipments of 500,000 units. According to writer Nick Talveski, the poor US sales were because "its dance-rock sound did not fit in with radio's then fascination with grunge-rock", thus signalling the band's declining popularity in the country. Five years later, the album was certified platinum on 16 December 1997 for sales of one million copies alone in the United States. In Canada, Welcome to Wherever You Are reached number ten on the RPM Albums Chart It received a gold accreditation by the Canadian Recording Industry Association (CRIA) on 26 March 1993 for shipments of 50,000 units.

== Legacy ==
Although INXS pursued a noisier, more rootsy sound for their next record, Full Moon, Dirty Hearts, the experimental nature of Welcome to Wherever You Are was a creative turning point for Hutchence, who then began an abandoned solo project with punk funk guitarist Andy Gill and Black Grape producer Danny Saber. In a rundown on INXS' discography, Classic Pop's Jon O'Brien wrote that the record "could never be accused of simply retreading over old ground", highlighting its experimental spirit "with a maturity befitting of a band now all well into their mid-thirties" and adding: "More than 30 years on, it’s stood the test of time, too." Welcome to Wherever You Are is also listed in the Gary Graff book 501 Essential Albums of the 90s (2024); contributor Helene Dunbar wrote that it represented the band "pushing in fresh directions of its own" to stay relevant during the grunge era.

== Track listing ==
All tracks are written by Andrew Farriss and Michael Hutchence, except where noted.

Welcome to Wherever You Are track listing
No.	Title	Writer(s)	Length
1.	"Questions"	Andrew Farriss	2:19
2.	"Heaven Sent"	A. Farriss	3:18
3.	"Communication"		5:29
4.	"Taste It"		3:27
5.	"Not Enough Time"		4:26
6.	"All Around"		3:30
7.	"Baby Don't Cry"	A. Farriss	4:57
8.	"Beautiful Girl"	A. Farriss	3:33
9.	"Wishing Well"		3:40
10.	"Back on Line"	Jon Farriss, Hutchence	3:24
11.	"Strange Desire"		4:39
12.	"Men and Women"	Hutchence	4:38

Bonus tracks on 2002 Remaster
No.	Title	Writer(s)	Length
13.	"The Answer"	A. Farriss, Hutchence	4:53
14.	"Wishing Well" (alternate version)	A. Farriss, Hutchence	3:30
15.	"All Around" (alternate version)	A. Farriss, Hutchence	3:25
16.	"The Indian Song"	A. Farriss, Hutchence	4:50
17.	"Heaven Sent" (waltz version)	A. Farriss, Hutchence	3:01

== Personnel ==
Personnel as listed in the album's liner notes are:

INXS

- Michael Hutchence – vocals
- Andrew Farriss – keyboards, guitars, orchestral arrangements (7, 12)
- Tim Farriss – guitars
- Kirk Pengilly – guitars, saxophone, vocals
- Garry Gary Beers – bass, vocals
- Jon Farriss – drums, percussion, vocals

Additional musicians

- Sunil De Silva – percussion (5)
- Australian Concert Orchestra – orchestra (7, 12)
- Mick Kenny – orchestral arrangements (7, 12)
- Colin Piper – conductor (7, 12)
- Phillip Hartl – concertmaster (7, 12)
- Deni Hines – backing vocals (5, 11)

Production

- Mark Opitz – producer
- INXS – producers
- Bob Clearmountain – mixing at A&M Studios (Hollywood, California)
- Niven Garland – engineer
- Melissa Van Twest – assistant engineer
- Neil Sandbach – orchestral engineer (7, 12)
- Leon Zervos – mastering at Studios 301 (Sydney, Australia)
- Steve Pyke – cover photography
- Peggy Sirota – band photography
- Michael Nash Assoc. – design

== Charts and certifications ==
=== Charts ===
Weekly chart performance for Welcome to Wherever You Are
Chart (1992–1993)	Peak position
Australian Albums (ARIA)	2
Austrian Albums (Ö3 Austria)	18
Canadian Albums (RPM)	10
Dutch Albums (Album Top 100)	35
French Albums (SNEP)	31
German Albums (Offizielle Top 100)	8
New Zealand Albums (RMNZ)	8
Norwegian Albums (VG-lista)	3
Swedish Albums (Sverigetopplistan)	1
Swiss Albums (Schweizer Hitparade)	2
UK Albums (OCC)	1
US Billboard 200	16

=== Certifications and sales ===
Certifications for Welcome to Wherever You Are
Region	Certification	Certified units/sales
Argentina (CAPIF)	—	27,000
Australia (ARIA)	Gold	35,000^{^}
Canada (Music Canada)	Gold	50,000^{^}
Sweden (GLF)	Gold	50,000^{^}
Switzerland (IFPI Switzerland)	Gold	25,000^{^}
United Kingdom (BPI)	Gold	100,000^{^}
United States (RIAA)	Platinum	1,000,000^{^}
Summaries
Worldwide (IFPI)	—N/a	2,000,000
^{^} Shipments figures based on certification alone.
