= The Strangest Party (These Are the Times) =

1994 single by INXS

Single by INXS

from the album The Greatest Hits
- Released: 10 October 1994
- Length: 3:54
- Label: Mercury
- Songwriters: Andrew Farriss; Michael Hutchence
- Producer: Chris Thomas

INXS singles chronology
"Freedom Deep" (1994)	"The Strangest Party (These Are the Times)" (1994)	"Elegantly Wasted" (1997)

Music video
- "The Strangest Party (These Are the Times)" on YouTube

"The Strangest Party (These Are the Times)" is a song by Australian band INXS. The track was written by Andrew Farriss and Michael Hutchence and produced by Chris Thomas. It was included as a new track on their 1994 compilation album The Greatest Hits. Released as a single in October 1994 by Mercury Records, the song reached number 15 on the UK Singles Chart and number 30 on the Australian Singles Chart. The accompanying music video for the single features the band performing in a futuristic, black sci-fi like setting.

== Background ==
The song "The Strangest Party (These Are the Times)", alongside the song "Deliver Me", was recorded for the group's Greatest Hits release with producer Chris Thomas, however, the music for the song was originally written by Andrew Farriss during the recording sessions of the band's previous studio album, Full Moon, Dirty Hearts. During the recording of "Deliver Me", the band wanted to add a second new track on the record, and decided to use the material that Andrew had previously written. The lyrics for the song were later added in by Michael Hutchence.

== Lyrics ==
In one interview during the promotion of their Greatest Hits release, Hutchence described the song as a commentary on the band's lifestyle, particularly the lyrics: "You're part of the solution or part of the problem." He also mentions this in the album's liner notes: "I think this new album and especially the new single, 'The Strangest Party' sums up our time so far with INXS. It's certainly been the strangest party I've ever been to."

== Critical reception ==
Upon the release, Larry Flick from Billboard magazine wrote, "New tune placed on band's greatest-hits album mines a familiar and somewhat safe field of funk-fortified rock. After the somewhat experimental nature of its last project, this will probably connect with fans who just want to jam. Smarter minds, however, will be fed by the song's clever lyrics, which are craftily delivered through a catchy, accessible melody." A reviewer from Music & Media commented, "The impression you get is of "The Best of INXS" rolled into one track. It's funky like their first singles, but the open dancey production is the "new sensation" here." Alan Jones from Music Week gave it a full score of five out of five and named it Pick of the Week, adding, "A loose, brooding new cut from the band's forthcoming Greatest Hits album is well up to the usual standard, with a powerful vocal from Hutchence and an exciting mix from Apollo 440, which should also give the band a dance hit."

== B-sides ==
The B-sides were a selection of remixes of album tracks as well as "Sing Something" a solo composition by guitarist Tim Farriss.

== Track listings ==
- INXCD 27 – CD single 1
1. "The Strangest Party (These Are the Times)"
2. "The Strangest Party" (Apollo 440 mix)
3. "Wishing Well" (Courier extended mix)
4. "Sing Something
- INXDD 27 – CD single 2
1. "The Strangest Party (These Are the Times)" (3:52)
2. "Need You Tonight" (Big Bump mix) (8:27)
3. "I'm Only Looking" (Bad Yard club mix) (8:07)
- INXS MC 27 – Cassette and 7-inch red vinyl single
1. "The Strangest Party"
2. "Wishing Well" (Courier extended mix)

== Charts ==
Chart (1994)	Peak position
Australia (ARIA)	34
Belgium (Ultratop 50 Flanders)	25
Europe (Eurochart Hot 100)	53
Europe (European Hit Radio)	8
Iceland (Íslenski Listinn Topp 40)	33
Netherlands (Dutch Top 40 Tipparade)	21
Scottish Singles Sales (Official Charts)	15
UK Singles (Official Charts)	15
UK Airplay (Music Week)	9

== Release history ==
Region	Date	Format(s)	Label(s)	Ref.
United Kingdom	10 October 1994	7-inch vinyl; CD; cassette	Mercury	
Australia	24 October 1994	CD; cassette	Mercury	
Japan	26 November 1994	Mini-CD	Mercury	
