= Kiss the Dirt (Falling Down the Mountain) =

- Cover art for Australian and US vinyl editions

Single by INXS

from the album Listen Like Thieves
- Released: March 1986; 22 August 1986 (UK)
- Recorded: August 1985
- Studio: Rhinoceros Studios (Sydney, Australia)
- Genre: Alternative rock; pop rock; college rock
- Length: 3:56
- Label: Atlantic
- Songwriters: Andrew Farriss; Michael Hutchence
- Producer: Chris Thomas

INXS singles chronology
"What You Need" (1985)	"Kiss the Dirt (Falling Down the Mountain)" (1986)	"Listen Like Thieves" (1986)

Music video
- "Kiss the Dirt (Falling Down the Mountain)" on YouTube

"Kiss the Dirt (Falling Down the Mountain)" is a song by the Australian rock band INXS. It was written by Andrew Farriss and Michael Hutchence from their fifth studio album Listen Like Thieves (1985).

It was released as the album's third single in March 1986 and reached number 15 on the Australian singles chart, becoming the band's tenth top 20 hit in their country. It was, however, the band's seventh single that failed to chart in the United States, but it did manage to reach number 24 on the Mainstream Rock Tracks chart.

The music video shows the band performing on a salt lake and on the moon plains in Coober Pedy in northern South Australia. The band flew direct from the United States to the site and filmed the clip overnight then flew back to the United States. In the bridge, the band is shown performing while fire and gloom cover the area, before the skies clear up at the end. It was directed by Alex Proyas.

== Charts ==
Chart (1986)	Peak position
Australia (Kent Music Report)	15
New Zealand (Recorded Music NZ)	42
UK singles chart	54
US Billboard Album Rock Tracks	24
