= Mystify (song) =

1989 single by INXS

Single by INXS

from the album Kick
- Released: 15 March 1989
- Genre: Funk
- Length: 3:17
- Label: WEA
- Songwriters: Andrew Farriss; Michael Hutchence; Tim Farriss
- Producer: Chris Thomas

INXS singles chronology
"Never Tear Us Apart" (1988)	"Mystify" (1989)	"Suicide Blonde" (1990)

"Mystify" is a song by Australian rock band INXS, released as the fifth and final single from their sixth studio album, Kick (1987). The song was written by Andrew Farriss, Michael Hutchence and Tim Farriss as part of the first sessions for Kick. The song was first previewed to Australian audiences on the Australian Made tour in January 1987.

== Music video ==
The video is a performance-style video shot in black and white, showing the writers of the song, Hutchence and Farriss, starting with part of a piano instrumental version of "Never Tear Us Apart" and seemingly "composing" the song in the studio on a piano. The video then cuts to the band recording and then performing the track to a live audience. It was directed by Richard Lowenstein and produced by Hamish "Hulk" Cameron.

== B-sides ==
The B-sides include remixes and LP versions of previous INXS songs, that following the trend of previous Kick releases, showcase the band's previous work. The German edition of the CD single included the 12-inch vinyl versions of "Shine Like It Does" and "Never Tear Us Apart" from the 1988 US Tour.

== Track listings ==
- UK 7-inch
1. "Mystify" (LP version)
2. "What You Need" (12-inch remix)
- UK 12-inch single
1. "Mystify" (LP version)
2. "Need You Tonight" (Ben Liebrand remix)
3. "Devil Inside" (extended remix)
4. "Listen Like Thieves" (album version)
- UK 12-inch global tour pack
1. "Mystify" (LP version)
2. "Biting Bullets"
3. "Shine Like It Does" (live)
4. "Never Tear Us Apart" (live)
- European 7-inch
1. "Mystify" (LP version)
2. "Need You Tonight" (Mendelsohn 7-inch edit)
- European 12-inch single
1. "Mystify"
2. "Need You Tonight" (Mendelsohn 7-inch edit)
3. "Shine Like It Does" (live)
4. "Never Tear Us Apart" (live)
- UK and German CD single
1. "Mystify" (LP version)
2. "What You Need" (12-inch remix)
3. "Listen Like Thieves" (album version)
4. "Devil Inside" (extended remix)

== Charts ==
Chart (1989)	Peak position
Canada Top Singles (RPM)	41
Europe (Eurochart Hot 100)	38
Ireland (IRMA)	5
Netherlands (Dutch Top 40 Tipparade)	14
Netherlands (Single Top 100)	53
Switzerland (Schweizer Hitparade)	24
UK Singles (OCC)	14
US Album Rock Tracks (Billboard)	17
West Germany (GfK)	46

== Certifications ==
Region	Certification	Certified units/sales
New Zealand (RMNZ)	Platinum	30,000^{‡}
United Kingdom (BPI)	Silver	200,000^{‡}
^{‡} Sales+streaming figures based on certification alone.

== Mellow Trax version ==
In 2004, German DJ Mellow Trax remixed the song. His version peaked at number 74 in Germany.

Chart (2004)	Peak position
Germany (GfK)	74
