= The Gift (INXS song) =

1993 single by INXS

Single by INXS

from the album Full Moon, Dirty Hearts
- Released: 1 October 1993
- Genre: Industrial rock
- Length: 4:03
- Label: EastWest
- Songwriters: Kirk Pengilly; Jon Farriss; Michael Hutchence
- Producers: Mark Opitz; INXS

INXS singles chronology
"Beautiful Girl" (1992)	"The Gift" (1993)	"Please (You Got That ...)" (1993)

Music video
- "The Gift" on YouTube

"The Gift" is the first single released from Australian rock band INXS's ninth studio album, Full Moon, Dirty Hearts (1993). The song was written by Kirk Pengilly, Jon Farriss and Michael Hutchence. Upon its release in October 1993 by East West Records, it reached number two in Portugal, number six on the US Billboard Album Rock Tracks chart, and number 16 in Australia. The accompanying music video was banned by MTV due to featuring controversial content.

== Music video ==
The music video for "The Gift" dramatises issues ranging from war and terrorism to famine and pollution with the band appearing to crash through the TV screen in anger. The video was banned by MTV owing to its use of Holocaust and Gulf War footage.

In an interview with the director and long-term collaborator Richard Lowenstein: "The video uses harrowing visuals in order to portray man's ability to create havoc and destruction. The message behind the video is to show how as viewers, we have become accepting of, and increasingly apathetic to images of gross human suffering and violence."

== B-sides ==
The B-sides on the first of two UK CD Single releases include two remixes of "The Gift", a live version of "Heaven Sent", and a cover of Steppenwolf's "Born to Be Wild", which was specially recorded for the April 1993 launch of Virgin Radio in the UK.

== Track listings ==
- CD single 1
1. "The Gift"
2. "The Gift" (Bonus Beats mix)
3. "Born to Be Wild"
- CD single 2
1. "The Gift"
2. "The Gift" (extended mix)
3. "Heaven Sent" (live)
- CD single 3
1. "The Gift"
2. "Born to Be Wild"
3. "The Gift" (extended mix)
4. "The Gift" (Bonus Beat mix)
5. "Heaven Sent" (live)
- 7-inch and cassette single
1. "The Gift"
2. "The Gift" (extended mix)

== Charts ==
Chart (1993)	Peak position
Australia (ARIA)	16
Belgium (Ultratop 50 Flanders)	36
Europe (Eurochart Hot 100)	27
Europe (European Hit Radio)	28
Ireland (IRMA)	25
New Zealand (Recorded Music NZ)	38
Portugal (AFP)	2
Sweden (Sverigetopplistan)	32
UK Singles (OCC)	11
UK Airplay (Music Week)	32
US Alternative Airplay (Billboard)	6

== Release history ==
Region	Date	Format(s)	Label(s)	Ref.
Australia	1 October 1993	CD; cassette	EastWest	
United Kingdom	11 October 1993	7-inch vinyl; CD; cassette	Mercury	
Japan	21 December 1993	CD	EastWest	
