= Disappear (INXS song) =

1990 single by INXS

Single by INXS

from the album X
- B-side: "Middle Beast"
- Released: 26 November 1990
- Length: 4:09
- Label: WEA
- Songwriters: Jon Farriss; Michael Hutchence
- Producer: Chris Thomas

INXS singles chronology
"Suicide Blonde" (1990)	"Disappear" (1990)	"By My Side" (1991)

"Disappear" is a song by Australian rock band INXS, released in November 1990 by WEA as the second single from their seventh studio album, X (1990). The song was written by Jon Farriss and Michael Hutchence while they were living together in Hong Kong in 1989.

"Disappear" peaked at number eight on the US Billboard Hot 100 in February 1991, becoming the band's seventh and final top-10 single. In Canada, the song reached number one for two weeks. It was a lesser hit on the UK Singles Chart, peaking at number 21 in December 1990. At the APRA Music Awards of 1992 the song won Most Performed Australian Work Overseas.

== B-sides ==
The B-sides of the "Disappear" single are a Coldcut remix of their 1985 hit "What You Need" and a solo composition called "Middle Beast", which was written and performed by bassist Garry Beers.

== Track listings ==
- 7-inch and cassette single
1. "Disappear" – 4:08
2. "Middle Beast" – 4:56
- Australian CD single
1. "Disappear" (extended 12-inch mix) – 6:50
2. "What You Need" (Coldcut Force mix) – 6:32
3. "Disappear" (7-inch mix) – 4:08
4. "Middle Beast" – 4:56
- Australian 12-inch single

A1. "Disappear" (extended 12-inch mix) – 6:50
B1. "Middle Beast" – 4:56
B2. "What You Need" (Coldcut Force mix) – 6:32

- UK CD single
1. "Disappear"
2. "Disappear" (extended 12-inch mix)
3. "What You Need" (Coldcut Force mix)

== Charts ==
=== Weekly charts ===
Chart (1990–1991)	Peak position
Australia (ARIA)	23
Austria (Ö3 Austria Top 40)	19
Belgium (Ultratop 50 Flanders)	12
Canada Top Singles (RPM)	1
Europe (Eurochart Hot 100)	43
Europe (European Hit Radio)	12
Germany (GfK)	43
Ireland (IRMA)	9
Luxembourg (Radio Luxembourg)	18
Netherlands (Dutch Top 40)	9
Netherlands (Single Top 100)	15
New Zealand (Recorded Music NZ)	25
Portugal (AFP)	5
Sweden (Sverigetopplistan)	20
UK Singles (Official Charts)	21
US Billboard Hot 100	8
US Alternative Airplay (Billboard)	10
US Dance Club Songs (Billboard)	41
US Dance Singles Sales (Billboard)	38
US Mainstream Rock (Billboard)	6
US Cash Box Top 100	7

=== Year-end charts ===
Chart (1991)	Position
Canada Top Singles (RPM)	24
US Billboard Hot 100	90
US Album Rock Tracks (Billboard)	31

== Release history ==
Region	Date	Format(s)	Label	Ref.
Australia	26 November 1990	7-inch vinyl; cassette	WEA	
United Kingdom	26 November 1990	7-inch vinyl; 12-inch vinyl; cassette	Mercury; Phonogram	
United Kingdom	10 December 1990	12-inch poster-bag vinyl	Mercury; Phonogram	
United Kingdom	17 December 1990	CD	Mercury; Phonogram	
Japan	25 January 1991	Mini-CD	WEA	
