= Beautiful Girl (INXS song) =

1993 single by INXS

Single by INXS

from the album Welcome to Wherever You Are
- Released: 1 February 1993
- Studio: Rhinoceros (Sydney)
- Length: 3:31
- Label: EastWest
- Songwriter: Andrew Farriss
- Producers: Mark Opitz; INXS

INXS singles chronology
"Taste It" (1992)	"Beautiful Girl" (1993)	"The Gift" (1993)

Music video
- "Beautiful Girl" on YouTube

"Beautiful Girl" a song by Australian rock band INXS, released in February 1993 by Mercury, Atlantic and EastWest Records as the fifth international single from their eighth album, Welcome to Wherever You Are (1992). It peaked at numbers 45 and 46 on the US Cash Box Top 100 and Billboard Hot 100 charts, number nine in Canada and number 34 in Australia.

== Background ==
The song was written by the INXS keyboardist Andrew Farriss, who was inspired to write it after the birth of his daughter Grace. In a December 2001 interview with Debbie Kruger for the Australasian Performing Right Association, Farriss explained: "I was writing lyrics like 'Baby Don't Cry' and 'Beautiful Girl' and lyrics just about how wonderful it is to have something else in your life besides yourself to worry about and think about."

The song was used for an American TV awareness campaign about the effects of anorexia.

== Reception ==
Q said that Hutchence sounded "a lot like Velvets-era Lou Reed on "Beautiful Girl", a delicate melody which the old-style INXS would have beaten to a pulp."

== B-sides ==
The B-sides on the first of two UK CD Single releases include solo compositions from lead guitarist Tim Farriss: "In My Living Room" and another by saxophonist and guitarist Kirk Pengilly entitled "Ashtar Speaks" as well the original version of "Strange Desire" from the Welcome to Wherever You Are album. The second CD release contained a remixed version of "Beautiful Girl", as well as a new remix of "Underneath the Colours" from the Underneath the Colours album and an instrumental version of "Wishing Well", also from the Welcome to Wherever You Are album.

== Track listings ==
- CD5 maxi single INXSCD24 Mercury/UK
1. Beautiful Girl (3:31)
2. Strange Desire (Original Recording) (4:40)
3. In My Living Room (3:56)
4. Ptar Speaks (3:39)
- CD maxi single INXCX24 Mercury/UK
1. Beautiful Girl (Mendelsohn Mix) (3.11)
2. Strange Desire (Original Recording) (4:40)
3. Underneath The Colours (Chicken Mix) (4.08)
4. Wishing Well (Instrumental) (3.26)
- CD5 45099-18322 EastWest/Australia
1. Beautiful Girl (3:31)
2. Strange Desire (Original Recording) (4:40)
3. In My Living Room (3:56)
4. Ptar Speaks (3:39)
5. Wishing Well (Instrumental) (3.26)
- 7-inch vinyl and Cassette single INXS24 Mercury/UK
1. Beautiful Girl (3:31)
2. Strange Desire (Original Recording) (4:40)
- Cassette single 4-87383 Atlantic/US
1. Beautiful Girl (3:31)
2. Strange Desire (Original Recording) (4:40)
- Cassette single 45099-1844-4 EastWest/Australia
1. Beautiful Girl (3:31)
2. Strange Desire (Original Recording) (4:40)
3. In My Living Room (3:56)
4. Ptar Speaks (3:39)

== Charts ==
=== Weekly charts ===
Chart (1993)	Peak position
Australia (ARIA)	34
Belgium (Ultratop 50 Flanders)	39
Canada Top Singles (RPM)	9
Europe (Eurochart Hot 100)	64
Europe (European Hit Radio)	12
Germany (GfK)	39
Iceland (Íslenski Listinn Topp 40)	11
Ireland (IRMA)	28
Netherlands (Single Top 100 Tipparade)	15
New Zealand (Recorded Music NZ)	50
UK Singles (Official Charts)	23
UK Airplay (Music Week)	10
US Billboard Hot 100	46
US Adult Contemporary (Billboard)	45
US Alternative Airplay (Billboard)	10
US Pop Airplay (Billboard)	24
US Cash Box Top 100	45

=== Year-end charts ===
Chart (1993)	Position
Canada Top Singles (RPM)	71

== Certifications ==
Region	Certification	Certified units/sales
New Zealand (RMNZ)	Platinum	30,000^{‡}
^{‡} Sales+streaming figures based on certification alone.

== Release history ==
Region	Date	Format(s)	Label(s)	Ref.
United Kingdom	1 February 1993	7-inch vinyl; CD1; cassette	Mercury	
United Kingdom	8 February 1993	CD2	Mercury	
Australia	14 March 1993	CD; cassette	EastWest	
