= Listen Like Thieves (song) =

- Australian 7-inch vinyl single

Single by INXS

from the album Listen Like Thieves
- B-side: "Different World"
- Released: June 1986
- Recorded: 1985
- Genre: College rock
- Length: 3:47
- Label: Atlantic
- Songwriters: Garry Gary Beers; Andrew Farriss; Jon Farriss; Tim Farriss; Michael Hutchence; Kirk Pengilly
- Producer: Chris Thomas

INXS singles chronology
"Kiss the Dirt (Falling Down the Mountain)" (1986)	"Listen Like Thieves" (1986)	"Good Times" (1986)

"Listen Like Thieves" is the title song and fourth and final single from Australian rock band INXS's fifth album, Listen Like Thieves (1985).

== Background ==
The song was written by Michael Hutchence, Kirk Pengilly, Garry Gary Beers, Andrew Farriss, Tim Farriss and Jon Farriss. The B-side to the single was "Different World", which appeared on the "Crocodile" Dundee soundtrack. It was released as a single during 1986, where it peaked at number 46. The track first appeared on the album which was released in October 1985.

== Music video ==
The music video was shot at the Westgarth Theatre in Melbourne, depicting the band performing in a post-apocalyptic setting.

== Reception ==
Cash Box praised the song as "a grooving, biting rock gem," as did Billboard who called it "crisp arena rock." Stephen Thomas Erlewine referred to the song, and "Kiss the Dirt (Falling Down the Mountain)" as "college rock staples."

== Charts ==
Chart (1986)	Peak position
Australia (Kent Music Report)	28
UK Singles (OCC)	46
US Billboard Hot 100	54
US Album Rock Tracks (Billboard)	12
Chart (1992)	Peak position
UK Singles (OCC)	58

== Cover versions ==
- Was (Not Was) covered the song and released it as a single in 1992 to promote their album Hello Dad... I'm in Jail. It reached number 58 on the UK Singles Chart.
