= Heaven Sent (INXS song) =

1992 single by INXS

Single by INXS

from the album Welcome to Wherever You Are
- B-side: "It Ain't Easy"; "11th Revolution"; "Deepest Red"
- Released: 22 June 1992
- Length: 3:18
- Label: EastWest
- Songwriter: Andrew Farriss
- Producer: Mark Opitz

INXS singles chronology
"Shining Star" (1991)	"Heaven Sent" (1992)	"Baby Don't Cry" (1992)

"Heaven Sent" is the first single from Australian rock band INXS's eighth studio album, Welcome to Wherever You Are (1992). It was released only in Europe, Japan, and Australia by East West Records. The song was written by Andrew Farriss who explained on the liner notes of the 2002 remaster: "Originally I wrote the song as a 3/4 ballad. The band heard it and rocked it up to make it the recording it became. The vocal effect helped give the track some extra attitude."

== B-sides ==
The B-sides include "It Ain't Easy", "11th Revolution", and "Deepest Red", a full band outtake from the X album written by Michael Hutchence and Jon Farriss. The UK 12-inch picture disc and Australian CD single include a demo version of "Heaven Sent" instead of "Deepest Red".

== Reception ==
Q noted the "slashing guitar tone. A more conventional INXS song apart from the snarling "megaphone" vocal, redolent of Stooges-era Iggy Pop. But where the old INXS were all weighed down with big-funk pretensions, this has an air of pure unselfconscious glee. It rocks."

== Track listings ==
- Australian CD single
1. "Heaven Sent"
2. "It Ain't Easy"
3. "11th Revolution"
4. "Deepest Red"
5. "Heaven Sent" (Gliding version)
- Australian cassette single and UK CD single
1. "Heaven Sent"
2. "It Ain't Easy"
3. "11th Revolution"
4. "Deepest Red"
- UK 7-inch and cassette single; Japanese mini-CD single
1. "Heaven Sent"
2. "It Ain't Easy"
- UK 12-inch picture-disc single

A1. "Heaven Sent"
A2. "It Ain't Easy"
B1. "11th Revolution"
B2. "Heaven Sent" (Gliding version)

== Charts ==
Chart (1992)	Peak position
Australia (ARIA)	13
Belgium (Ultratop 50 Flanders)	24
Canada Top Singles (RPM)	39
Europe (Eurochart Hot 100)	46
Germany (GfK)	47
Greece (IFPI)	9
Netherlands (Dutch Top 40)	35
Netherlands (Single Top 100)	32
Portugal (AFP)	10
Sweden (Sverigetopplistan)	35
Switzerland (Schweizer Hitparade)	23
UK Singles (Official Charts)	31
UK Airplay (Music Week)	13
US Alternative Airplay (Billboard)	2
US Mainstream Rock (Billboard)	4

== Release history ==
Region	Date	Format(s)	Label(s)	Ref.
Australia	22 June 1992	CD; cassette	EastWest	
United Kingdom	6 July 1992	7-inch vinyl; cassette	Mercury	
Japan	25 August 1992	Mini-CD	EastWest	
