= Taste It =

1992 single by INXS

Single by INXS

from the album Welcome to Wherever You Are
- Released: 2 November 1992
- Length: 3:31
- Label: EastWest
- Songwriters: Andrew Farriss; Michael Hutchence
- Producers: Mark Opitz; INXS

INXS singles chronology
"Not Enough Time" (1992)	"Taste It" (1992)	"Beautiful Girl" (1993)

"Taste It" is a song by Australian rock band INXS, released in November 1992 by Eastwest Records as the fourth single from their eighth album, Welcome to Wherever You Are (1992). The song was written by Andrew Farriss and Michael Hutchence. It peaked at No. 36 on the Australian Singles Chart and also charted in New Zealand, Switzerland, the United Kingdom, and the United States.

== B-sides ==
The B-sides include a solo compositions from guitarist Kirk Pengilly entitled "Light the Planet" as well as Youth remixes of "Taste It" and a Ralphi Rosario club mix of future single "Not Enough Time". In the UK, a second CD was available with further club mixes of three singles from the X album.

== Reception ==
Q said, "The simple fact is that after a sustained period of rock in excess, INXS have found soul. "Taste It" grooves on a marvellously ambient and woolly drum sound."

== Track listings ==
- Australian CD single
1. "Taste It" (LP version)
2. "Taste It" (Youth 12-inch mix)
3. "Not Enough Time"
- UK 7-inch and cassette single
1. "Taste It" (LP version)
2. "Light the Planet"
- UK CD1
1. "Taste It" (LP version)
2. "Taste It" (Youth 12-inch mix)
3. "Not Enough Time" (Ralphi Rosario mix)
4. "Light the Planet"
- UK CD2
1. "Taste It" (Youth a cappella mix)
2. "Suicide Blonde" (Oakenfold Milk mix)
3. "Disappear" (Morales mix)
4. "Bitter Tears" (Lorimer 12-inch mix)
- German maxi-CD single
1. "Taste It" (LP version)
2. "Taste It" (Youth 12-inch mix)
3. "Light the Planet"
4. "Suicide Blonde" (Oakenfold Milk mix)
- US CD single
1. "Taste It" (LP version)
2. "Questions" (no vocals)
- US cassette single
1. "Taste It" (LP version)
2. "11th Revolution"
- Japanese mini-CD single
1. "Taste It" (LP version)
2. "Taste It" (Youth 12-inch mix)

== Chart performance ==
The song reached No. 21 in the United Kingdom and No. 36 in Australia. In the United States, it reached No. 5 on the Billboard Modern Rock Tracks chart.

=== Weekly charts ===
Chart (1992)	Peak position
Australia (ARIA)	36
Europe (Eurochart Hot 100)	79
New Zealand (Recorded Music NZ)	31
Switzerland (Schweizer Hitparade)	38
UK Singles (Official Charts)	21
UK Airplay (Music Week)	10
UK Club Chart (Music Week)	61
US Bubbling Under Hot 100 (Billboard)	1
US Alternative Airplay (Billboard)	5

== Release history ==
Region	Date	Format(s)	Label	Ref.
United Kingdom	2 November 1992	7-inch vinyl; CD; cassette	Mercury	
Japan	21 December 1992	Mini-CD	EastWest	
