= INXS =

Australian rock band (1977–2012)

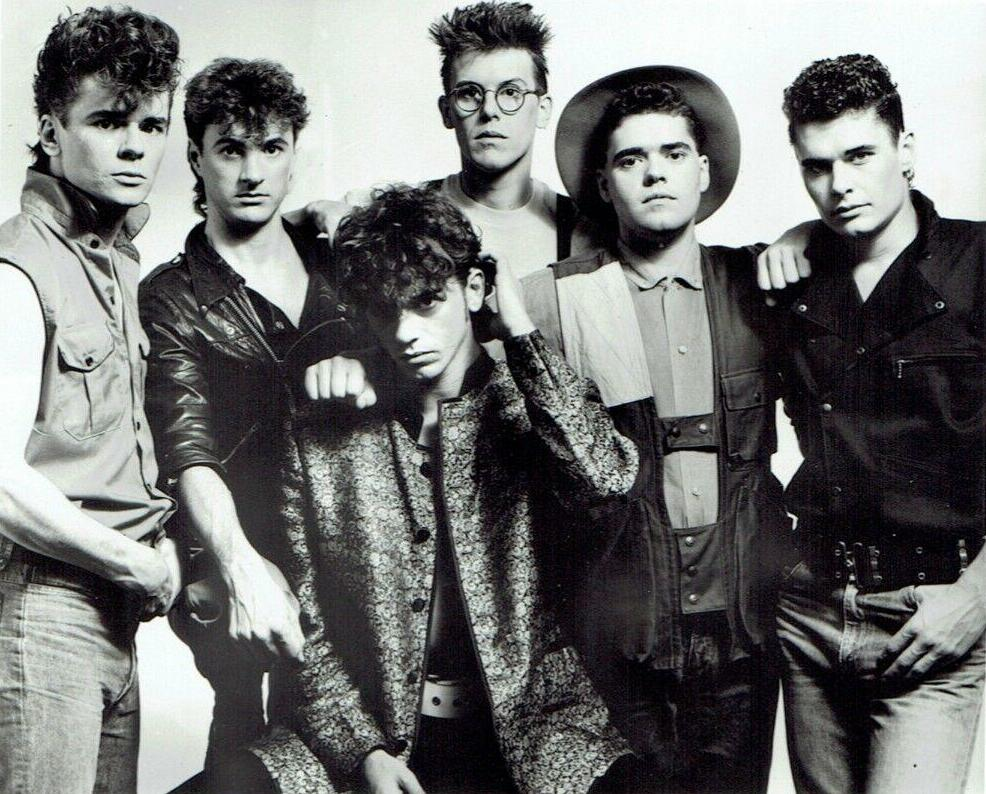
- INXS in 1983

Background information
- Also known as: The Farriss Brothers (1977–1979)
- Origin: Sydney, New South Wales, Australia
- Genres: New wave; pub rock; dance-rock; funk rock; alternative rock
- Works: INXS discography
- Years active: 1977–2012
- Labels: Atlantic; Epic; 101 Distribution; Mercury; DeLuxe; WEA; Eastwest; Polydor; Atco; Petrol Electric; Truism
- Spinoffs: Max Q
- Past members: Garry Gary Beers; Andrew Farriss; Jon Farriss; Tim Farriss; Michael Hutchence; Kirk Pengilly; Jon Stevens; J.D. Fortune; Ciaran Gribbin
- Website: inxs.com

INXS (a phonetic play on "in excess") were an Australian rock band formed in 1977 in Sydney. Originally called the Farriss Brothers, the band's founding members were bassist Garry Gary Beers, main composer and keyboardist Andrew Farriss, drummer Jon Farriss, guitarist Tim Farriss, lead singer and main lyricist Michael Hutchence, and guitarist and saxophonist Kirk Pengilly. For 20 years, INXS were fronted by Hutchence, whose stage presence made him the focal point of the band.

In 1984, INXS had their first number-one hit in Australia with "Original Sin". The band achieved international success in the mid-to-late 1980s and early 1990s with the hit albums Listen Like Thieves, Kick, and X and the singles "What You Need" (1985), "Need You Tonight" (1987) (the band's only US number-one single), "New Sensation" (1987), "Devil Inside" (1988), "Never Tear Us Apart" (1988), and "Suicide Blonde" (1990).

After Hutchence's death on 22 November 1997, INXS made appearances with several guest singers. Beginning in 2000, the band toured and recorded with Jon Stevens as lead singer. In 2005, members of INXS participated in Rock Star: INXS, a reality television series that culminated in the selection of Canadian J.D. Fortune as their new lead singer. Irish singer-songwriter Ciaran Gribbin replaced Fortune as lead singer in 2011. INXS performed their final concert on 11 November 2012.

INXS won six Australian Recording Industry Association (ARIA) awards, including the award for "Best Group" in 1987, 1989 and 1992, respectively. In addition, the band were inducted into the ARIA Hall of Fame in 2001. They have sold over 50 million records worldwide.

== History ==
=== Early years ===
The origins of the band began with Andrew Farriss convincing his Davidson High School classmate, Michael Hutchence, to join his band, Doctor Dolphin. The band contained two further classmates, Kent Kerny and Neil Sanders, as well as Garry Beers and Geoff Kennely, both from the nearby Forest High School. In 1977, Tim Farriss, Andrew's older brother, invited Andrew, Hutchence and Beers to join him and his schoolmate Kirk Pengilly. Tim and Pengilly had been playing together since 1971 as either an acoustic duo known as Kirk and Tim or as a four-piece band called Guinness (named after their bass player's dog). Together with younger brother Jon Farriss, they formed "The Farriss Brothers", which consisted of Garry Beers on bass guitar, Andrew Farriss on keyboards, Jon Farriss on drums, Tim Farriss on lead guitar, Michael Hutchence on lead vocals and Kirk Pengilly on guitar and saxophone. The band made their debut on 16 August 1977 at Whale Beach, 40 km (25 mi) north of Sydney.

The parents of the Farriss boys relocated to Perth, Western Australia in 1978, taking Jon to continue his schooling and as soon as Hutchence and Andrew finished school, the rest of the band followed. They briefly performed as The Vegetables before returning to Sydney ten months later and recording a set of demos. At a chance meeting in the car park of the Royal Antler, a pub in Narrabeen, Tim was approached by Midnight Oil manager Gary Morris.

The band began to regularly support Midnight Oil and other local bands. Morris advised that a member of the Oils crew had come up with a new name and suggested they change it to INXS. The name INXS was inspired by English band XTC and Australian jam makers IXL. Pengilly later explained that Morris was interested in turning the group into a Christian band, which the band briefly considered before rejecting the idea. The band's name is a word play on the phrase "in excess".

The band's first performance as INXS was on 1 September 1979 at the Ocean Beach Hotel in Umina on the Central Coast of New South Wales and by the end of 1979, after passing on the Christian band image, they hired Chris "CM" Murphy as their manager and continued taking on the Australian pub circuit. Murphy was an adept business manager and negotiator and by early 1980 the band had signed a five-album record deal with a Sydney independent label, Deluxe Records, run by Michael Browning, a former manager of AC/DC.

=== 1980s ===
==== From "Simple Simon" to Shabooh Shoobah ====
INXS released their first single, "Simple Simon"/"We Are the Vegetables", in Australia and France in May 1980. The single had its debut TV performance on Simon Townsend's Wonder World. Their debut album, INXS, was recorded at Trafalgar Studios in Annandale, Sydney. It was co-produced by the band and Duncan McGuire (ex-Ayers Rock), with all songs attributed to the entire band, at the insistence of Murphy. Deluxe gave them a budget of $10,000 to record the album, so to keep within the budget they had to record from midnight to dawn, usually after doing one or more performances earlier that night. The album was released in October 1980. It featured "Just Keep Walking" which was their first Australian Top 40 single, with the album peaking in the Top 30 of the Kent Music Report for Australian albums. The album eventually went gold (selling over 35,000 units) but it took a number of years to do so.

These early records demonstrated their new wave/ska/pop style, and were followed by near constant touring with almost 300 shows during 1981 as the band developed their status as a live act. In 1981, they signed Gary Grant as their tour manager, who then became co-manager a year later. Between touring commitments, the band released their third single in May 1981, "The Loved One", which was a cover of a 1966 song by Australian group the Loved Ones. The song was recorded at Studios 301 in Sydney; it was produced by Richard Clapton and peaked in the Top 20.

The success of the single led to Clapton and the band returning to Studios 301 between July and August 1981 to create an album. In October 1981, their second album Underneath the Colours was released and became a hit in Australia peaking at No. 15.

Soon after recording sessions had finished, band members started work on outside projects. Beers, Jon and Andrew Farriss played on Clapton's solo album, The Great Escape. Hutchence recorded "Speed Kills", written by Don Walker of Cold Chisel for the soundtrack of the film Freedom directed by Scott Hicks. It was his first solo single and was released by WEA in early 1982.

Deluxe had been unable to attract international interest so the band decided to record a new song, "The One Thing" at their own expense with Mark Opitz at Paradise Studios. The song turned out so well that Murphy hired Opitz to produce three more songs. Murphy approached WEA Australia with copies of the song, leading to INXS signing a recording deal in July 1982 with WEA for releases in Australia, South East Asia, Japan, New Zealand, Atco Records (a subsidiary of Atlantic Records) for North America, and PolyGram for Europe including the UK.

Murphy and the band were not entirely convinced that Opitz could produce an entire album that would attract international interest, so before recording their third album Pengilly, Hutchence, and Andrew Farriss visited the United Kingdom and USA, with a view to selecting a suitable producer, only to find that no one they wanted was available and that most people advised them that Opitz's work on their single was as good as they could wish for.

In mid-1982, INXS began recording at Rhinoceros Studios with Opitz. In October 1982, Shabooh Shoobah was released internationally on Atlantic/Atco Records, peaking at No. 52 on the US Billboard 200 and No. 46 on the Hot Pop Albums chart. In Australia it peaked at No. 5 and remained in the albums charts for 94 weeks. The single "The One Thing" brought them their first Top 30 hit in United States peaking at No. 30 on 28 May 1983, It was also a Top 20 hit in Canada, and peaked at No. 14 in Australia on 23 August 1982. "One Thing" was their first video to air on the fledgling MTV and significantly added to the ultimate success of the single.

INXS undertook their first US performance in San Diego in March 1983 to a crowd of 24 patrons. Their first tour was as support for Adam and the Ants, then support for Stray Cats, The Kinks, and Hall & Oates followed by The Go-Go's. INXS played alongside many of their contemporaries on New Wave Day in May 1983 at the US Festival in Devore, San Bernardino, California. During that time, their co-manager Gary Grant relocated permanently to New York City to ensure a continual presence in the northern hemisphere. The band remained on the road in the US for most of the year, including support for Men at Work and by mid-1983 were headlining venues such as The Ritz in New York.

==== From "Original Sin" to Listen Like Thieves ====
After a performance in Toronto the band was approached by producer Nile Rodgers; by September 1983, the band had recorded "Original Sin" (originally entitled "Brand New Day") at New York's Power Station Studios. Three tracks from Shabooh Shoobah were featured in the soundtrack for the 1984 film Reckless. The band then travelled to the UK to begin sessions on their fourth album with Nick Launay at the Manor Studios in Oxford.

The album The Swing, released in April 1984, received significant attention from around the world, as "Original Sin" became the band's first No. 1 single in Australia and was popular worldwide with fans and reviewers. During 1984, the single reached no. 1 in Australia (for two weeks in January), Argentina, and France; No. 6 in New Zealand; No. 11 in Canada; No. 23 in Switzerland; No. 31 in the Netherlands; and No. 58 in the US However, "Original Sin" was largely ignored in the UK, and INXS would not have any Top 50 chart success in the United Kingdom until the 1985 album Listen Like Thieves.

During 1984, INXS toured non-stop, performing across Europe, the UK, the US and Australia. By December 1984, The Swing had gone double platinum, making it one of the five biggest domestic albums in the history of Australian music at the time.

In March 1985, the band returned to Sydney's Rhinoceros Studios and recorded the Listen Like Thieves album along with producer Chris Thomas (the Sex Pistols, Pink Floyd, the Pretenders, Elton John). As the band was finishing the recording sessions, Thomas stated that the album was not good enough and still had no "killer" track. Andrew produced a demo tape of a funk song he had been working on called "Funk Song No. 13" and evolved it into "What You Need".

While the band was recording, WEA released Dekadance, a limited edition 12" Vinyl and cassette only EP of INXS remixes from their albums The Swing and Shabooh Shoobah.

On 19 May 1985, INXS won seven awards at the 1984 Countdown Music and Video Awards ceremony. They performed "Burn for You", dressed in Akubras (hats) and Drizabones (outdoor coats/oilskin jackets). The band performed five songs for the July 1985 Oz for Africa concert, in conjunction with the Live Aid benefit. Two INXS songs, "What You Need" and "Don't Change", were also in the BBC's Live Aid broadcast and are contained on the four DVD boxed set released in 2004.

Listen Like Thieves was released in October 1985 to critical approval, reaching No. 3 on the Australian charts and No. 11 on the US charts. With the release of Listen Like Thieves, the band developed a rock sound influenced by Led Zeppelin and XTC while remaining true to the band's original roots in Aussie pubs. It was also the first album to feature songs written by a combination of band members, with Andrew Farris and Hutchence becoming the primary songwriters in the years to follow.

The first US single from the album, "This Time", stalled at No. 81 in late 1985, but the next single, "What You Need"—released there in early 1986—became a top five Billboard hit, bringing INXS its first break-out US success. The single was also a top 20 hit in Canada and reached No. 2 in Australia (September 1985), but only reached No. 51 on the UK charts. The British press dismissed the album, with New Musical Express calling the band 'INX-cusable' and a reviewer declaring Listen Like Thieves to be a 'complete and utter turkey'. In the United States, however, Rolling Stone wrote, "INXS rocks with passion and seals the deal with a backbeat that'll blackmail your feet."

In August 1985, INXS toured ahead of the release of Listen Like Thieves, touring South America before returning to Melbourne to play for Prince Charles and Princess Diana of Wales at a concert. The concert was filmed and later released on a home video entitled Living INXS; an edited version of the concert was played on MTV in the US in 1985 on its Saturday night concert series. INXS toured North America, Europe, and New Zealand from November 1985 to February 1986.

Next, the band took a two-month break, with Andrew Farriss writing and producing "You're Gonna Get Hurt" for Jenny Morris (who had previously been a backing vocalist with the band), and Hutchence featuring in Richard Lowenstein's second feature film Dogs in Space. Lowenstein had previously made the video clip for "Dancing on the Jetty". While a song from the movie, "Rooms for the Memory", written by Ollie Olsen, with vocals by Hutchence charted, the movie was received well by critics but was not a commercial success. Beginning in May 1986, the band performed 32 European shows (including support for Queen at their Live at Wembley '86 concert on 12 July), 42 US shows, and 12 Australian shows. America's influential Musician magazine called INXS "the best live band in the world."

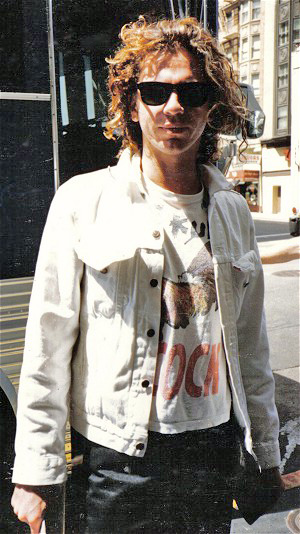
Lead singer Michael Hutchence in 1986

==== From "Good Times" to Kick ====
While the band took an eight-month break before beginning work on a new album, manager CM Murphy decided to stage a series of major outdoor concerts across Australia featuring INXS, Jimmy Barnes, Models, Divinyls, Mental as Anything, The Triffids and I'm Talking. To promote the tour, INXS recorded two songs with Jimmy Barnes of Cold Chisel: The Easybeats cover "Good Times" and "Laying Down the Law" which Barnes co-wrote with Beers, Andrew Farriss, Jon Farriss, Hutchence and Pengilly. "Good Times" was used as the theme song for the Australian Made series of concerts in the summer of 1986–1987. It peaked at No. 2 on the Australian charts, and months later was featured in the Joel Schumacher film The Lost Boys and its soundtrack, allowing it to peak at No. 47 in the US on 1 August 1987.

After the success of "What You Need" and Listen Like Thieves, the band knew their new material would have to be even better and wanted every song on the album to be good enough to be a single. They recorded Kick in Sydney and Paris, produced by Chris Thomas. According to the 2005 official autobiography, Atlantic Records was not happy with the result; the label offered the band $1 million to go back to Australia and record another album, but the band declined.

Despite Atlantic's protests, Kick was released in October 1987 and provided the band with worldwide popularity. The album peaked at No. 1 in Australia, No. 3 on the US Billboard 200, No. 9 in UK, and No. 15 in Austria. It was an upbeat, confident album that yielded four Top 10 US singles: No. 1 single "Need You Tonight", "Devil Inside", "New Sensation", and "Never Tear Us Apart". "Need You Tonight" peaked No. 2 on the UK charts, No. 3 in Australia, and No. 10 in France. The band toured heavily behind the album throughout 1987 and 1988. The video for the 1987 INXS track "Mediate" (which played after the video for "Need You Tonight") replicated the format of Bob Dylan's video for "Subterranean Homesick Blues", even in its use of apparently deliberate errors. In September 1988, the band swept the MTV Video Music Awards, with the video for "Need You Tonight/Mediate" winning in five categories. Kick was nominated for Best Rock Performance by a Duo or Group with Vocal in 1989.

=== 1990–1997: From X to Elegantly Wasted ===
In October 1990, INXS released X which was produced by Chris Thomas. The album peaked at No. 3 in Australia, No. 5 in the US, No. 2 in the UK, No. 5 in Switzerland and No. 10 in Sweden. It followed in the same vein as Kick, and added harmonica to some songs. X scored hits with "Suicide Blonde" and "Disappear" (both Top 10 in the US). "Suicide Blonde" peaked at No. 2 in Australia, No. 11 in the UK and in Switzerland. Other singles from X were "Bitter Tears" and "By My Side", which had less chart success.

Michael Hutchence with INXS in Madrid 1990

INXS performed at Wembley Stadium on 13 July 1991, during their "Summer XS" tour stop in London to a sold-out audience of 74,000 fans. This performance was recorded and filmed to become Live Baby Live, a live album that was released in November 1991 and peaked in the Top 30 in the Australia and UK album charts. The album had less success on The Billboard 200. This concert was the band's most well-attended show of all time; according to a 2017 article by Paul Donoughue of ABC.net.au, it "solidified [INXS's] place in pop history".

On 28 March 1992, INXS performed at the controversial Concert for Life at Centennial Park in Sydney (a fundraiser for the Victor Chang Cardiac Research Centre), and other performers included Crowded House, Yothu Yindi, Jenny Morris, Diesel, Ratcat, and Def FX. Due to inclement weather, the expected attendance of 100,000 never came through, and the event only raised $500,000.

Welcome to Wherever You Are, produced by Mark Opitz and released in August 1992, was an experimental album using sitars and a 60-piece orchestra while adding a more "raw" sound. It received good critical reviews reaching No. 1 in the UK and in Sweden; No. 2 in Australia and Switzerland, and No. 3 in Norway, but had less chart success in the US (peaking at No. 16). Singles from the album included "Taste It" and "Baby Don't Cry", which were Top 20 successes in UK but had less success in US and Australian markets.

In August 1992, Hutchence suffered a fractured skull in an altercation in Copenhagen. He was left with brain damage. The injury led to periods of depression and increased levels of aggression. According to Beers, Hutchence brandished a knife and threatened to kill him during the 1993 recording of Full Moon, Dirty Hearts. Beers recalled, "Over those six weeks, Michael threatened or physically confronted nearly every member of the band."

Full Moon, Dirty Hearts, produced by Opitz, was released in November 1993 and peaked at No. 3 on the UK charts, No. 4 in Australia, No. 8 in Sweden, No. 9 in Switzerland, No. 14 in Norway; it did not reach the Top 50 in the US. The title track featured The Pretenders' Chrissie Hynde, and another track--"Please (You Got That)"—featured Ray Charles. The band made a full video album for the record using unknown Australian students to direct with help from Richard Lowenstein. Full Moon, Dirty Hearts received mixed reviews. It was the last record under INXS's contract with Atlantic in the States.

In 1997, INXS released a comeback album entitled Elegantly Wasted. It fared respectably in Australia (No. 14), Canada (No. 14), France (No. 30), UK (No. 16) (where INXS had more success in the 1990s than in the 1980s), Belgium (No. 7), Switzerland (No. 13), but only reached No. 41 in US.

On 22 November 1997, Hutchence was found dead in his Sydney Ritz-Carlton hotel room. On 6 February 1998, New South Wales State Coroner Derrick Hand presented his report, which ruled that Hutchence's death was a suicide while depressed and under the influence of drugs and alcohol.

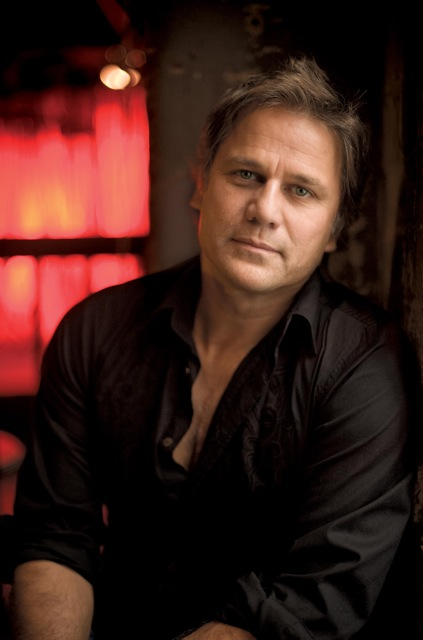
The members of INXS collaborated with several Australian singers before settling on Jon Stevens as a replacement for Hutchence.

=== 1997–2003: Transitional years ===
INXS were fronted by Hutchence for 20 years, and his stage presence had made him the focal point of the band. After his death, INXS did not perform publicly for almost a year, and then only made a few one-off performances with different guest singers until 2000.

On 14 November 1998, they played at the Mushroom 25 Concert with Jimmy Barnes fronting for two songs: "The Loved One" and "Good Times". On 12 June 1999, they headlined the opening of Stadium Australia in Sydney, with US singer-songwriter Terence Trent D'Arby and Russell Hitchcock as guest vocalists, they performed "New Sensation", "Kick", "Never Tear Us Apart" and "What You Need". In December 2000, INXS performed a concert with singers Suze DeMarchi and Jon Stevens sharing the spotlight. DeMarchi was reportedly offered the role of permanent singer in the band.

The former lead singer of Australian band Noiseworks, Jon Stevens, began singing with INXS on a regular basis. INXS played as one of the headline acts at the Sydney 2000 Olympics and then toured through South America and Europe in 2001. Stevens was officially named a member of INXS in 2002, and the band started recording new material in November. He left the band in October 2003 to pursue a solo career.

=== 2004–2011: Rock Star: INXS and J.D. Fortune era ===
INXS returned to the news in 2004 when it was announced that a new reality television program titled Rock Star: INXS would feature a contest to find a new lead vocalist for the band. On 20 September 2005, J.D. Fortune won the eleven-week competition and became the new lead singer of INXS.

With Fortune as lead singer, INXS released the single "Pretty Vegas" on 4 October 2005. The single reached No. 5 on the iTunes Store ranking of daily most downloaded songs on its first day. It peaked at No. 9 in Australia and No. 37 on the Billboard Hot 100, and became a huge radio airplay hit in Fortune's native Canada. On 29 November 2005, Switch—the band's first album with Fortune as lead singer—was released in the United States via Epic Records. The band's new line-up started a world tour in support of Switch in January 2006. In September 2006, INXS and Epic Records parted ways. INXS toured Australia and New Zealand in March 2007 with Simple Minds and support band Arrested Development. The band signed with Petrol Electric Records in December 2008, reuniting them with former manager CM Murphy.

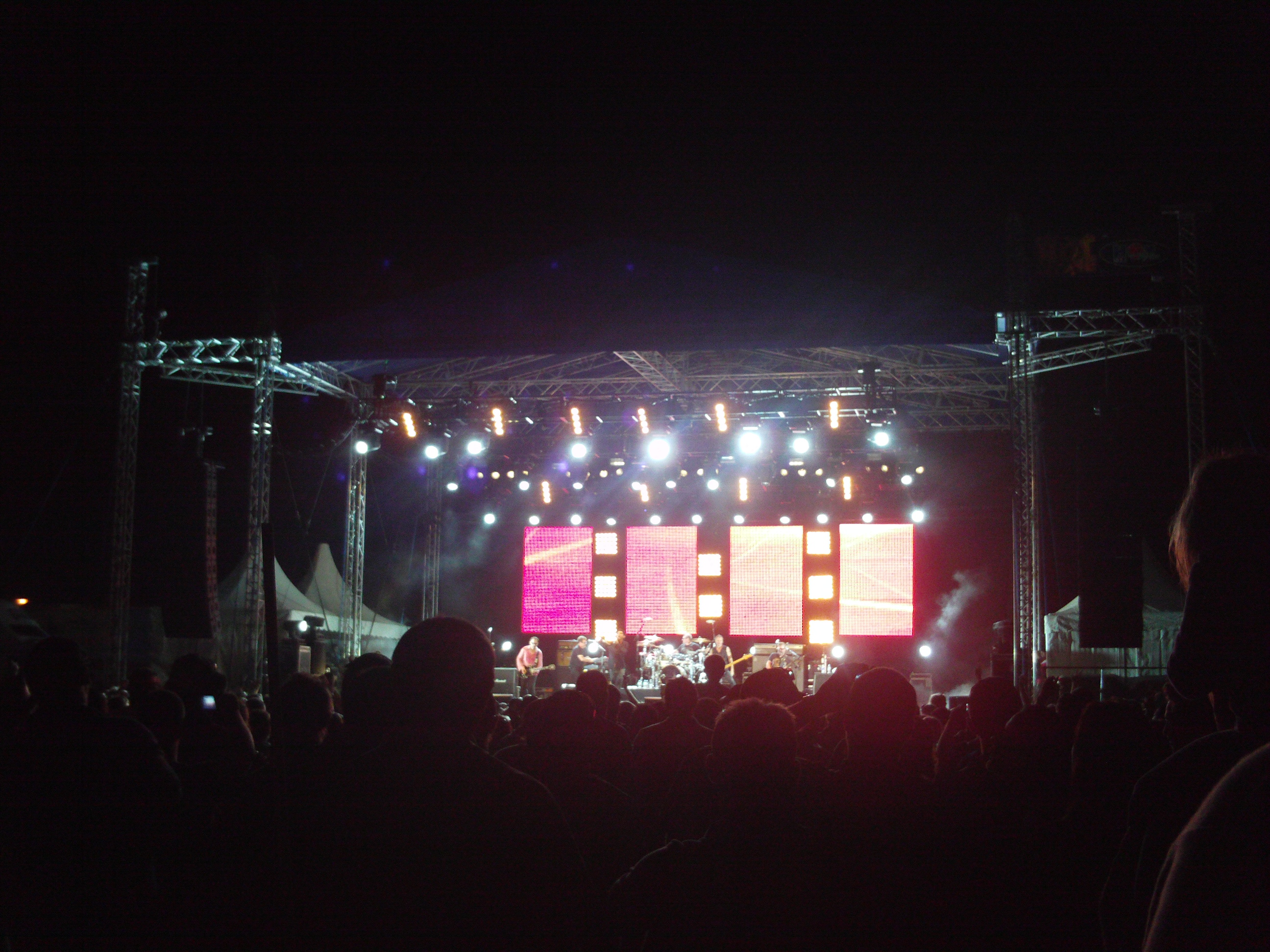
INXS live in Townsville, Australia in 2010

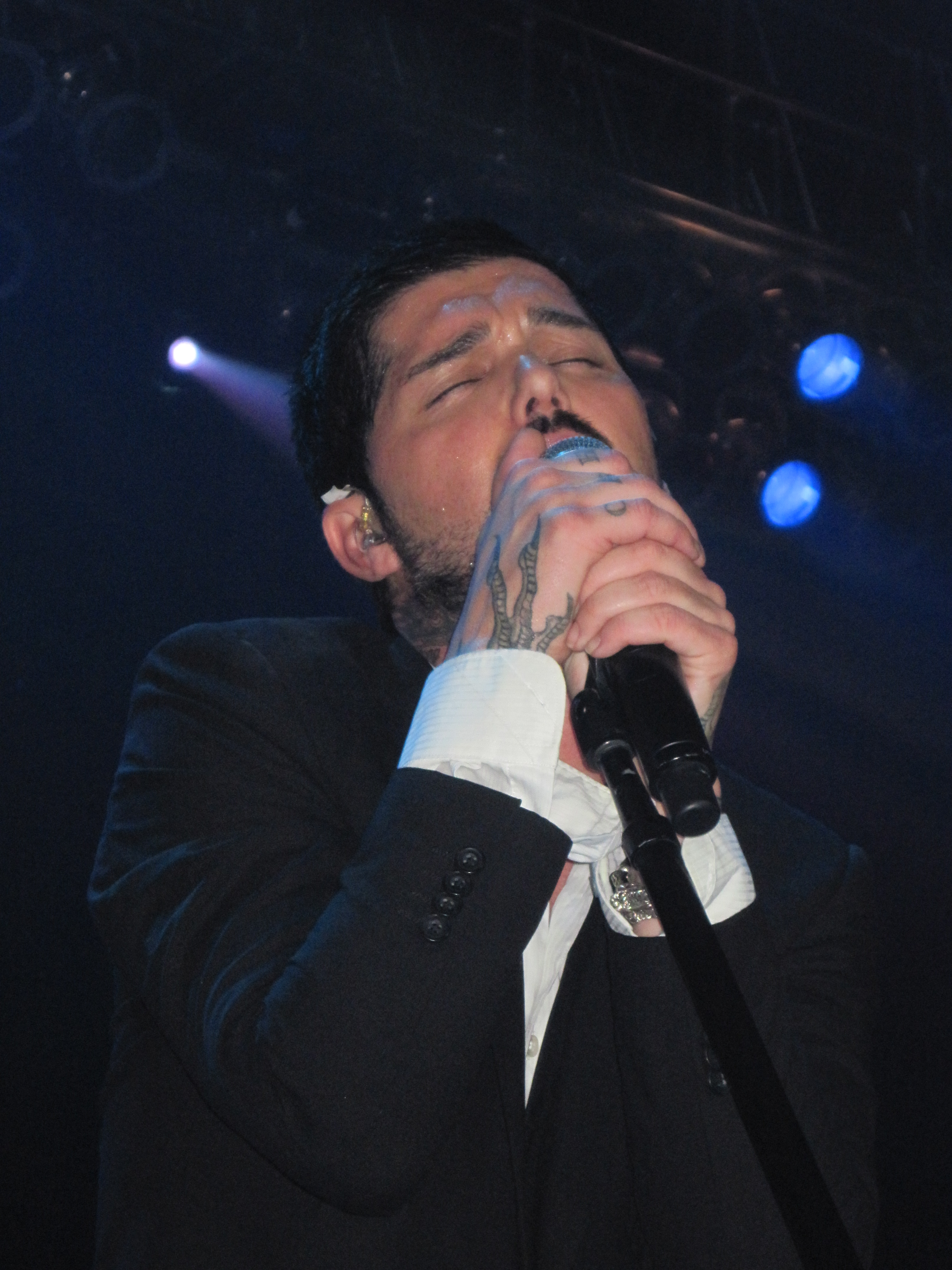
J.D. Fortune performing with the band in July 2011

On 16 February 2009, J.D. Fortune told Entertainment Tonight Canada that INXS had let him go from the band with a shake of the hand at an airport in Hong Kong. Murphy denied this and added that Fortune was next on his list to call regarding a major recording contract he was negotiating for the band. In a 6 March 2009 interview, Fortune said that after returning to Canada from Hong Kong, he believed there were still two more legs of the INXS 2007 tour to complete. When the rest of the tour was cancelled and the band did not return his calls for 10 months, he believed he was out of the band.

On 30 November 2009, Andrew Farriss, Jon Farriss, and Kirk Pengilly performed an acoustic version of "Don't Change" with the Qantas Choir at the Pride of Australia Awards. The band performed at the Vancouver 2010 Winter Olympics on 24 February 2010 with guest singers J.D. Fortune and Argentine singer Deborah de Corral.

During a radio interview with Kirk Pengilly and J.D. Fortune in July 2010 just before the Broome concert, Pengilly confirmed that Fortune had returned as the band's permanent singer. In August 2010, Petrol Records issued Australian radio stations with a one-track promo "Never Tear Us Apart" featuring Ben Harper on vocals, a preview from the upcoming INXS Michael Hutchence tribute album Original Sin. On 25 September 2010, the band performed before the 2010 AFL Grand Final. On 19 October 2010, it was announced in the Courier Mail that INXS, fronted by J.D. Fortune, would tour as part of the A Day on the Green winery concerts in February."

The band recorded an album in memory of Michael Hutchence entitled Original Sin. Released in November 2010, the album featured well-known singers from Australia and around the world, including Ben Harper, Patrick Monahan, and Rob Thomas.

In September 2011, INXS announced that J.D. Fortune had again left the band and Northern Irish singer-songwriter Ciaran Gribbin was the band's frontman for their forthcoming tour of Australia, South America, and Europe in November and December 2011.

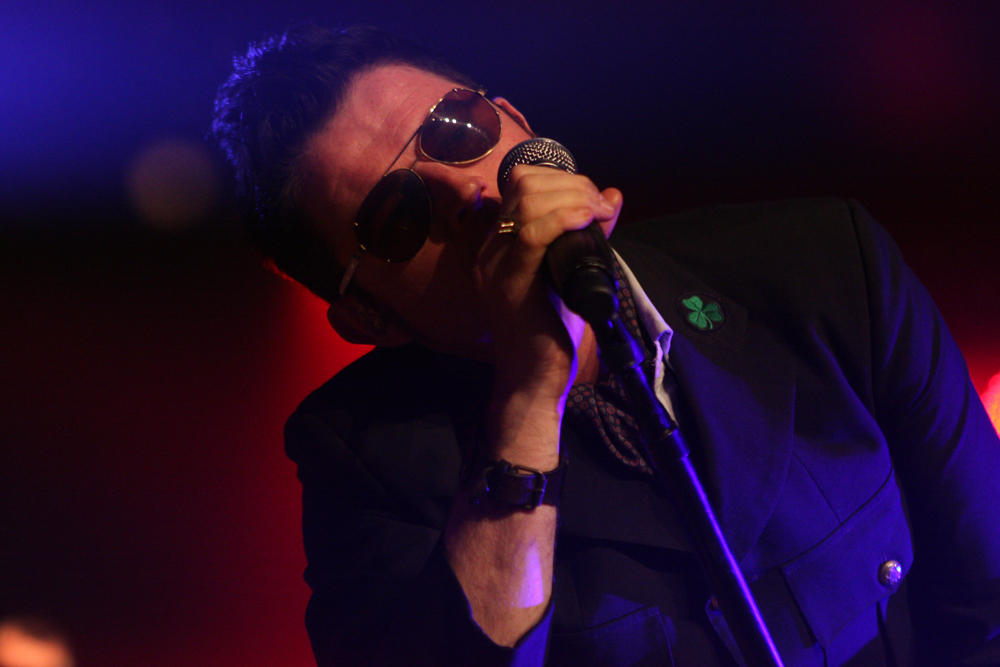
Ciaran Gribbin performing with the band in July 2012

=== 2011–2012: Final years ===
The band released a demo of a song, called "Tiny Summer" in streaming format on their official website in September 2011. When INXS announced Fortune's departure, they also announced that Northern Irish singer-songwriter Ciaran Gribbin would serve as the band's frontman in their upcoming tour of Australia, South America, and Europe in November and December 2011.

At a 11 November 2012 concert at the newly opened Perth Arena, INXS announced that they were playing their final show. Kirk Pengilly stated that it was appropriate to finish where they had started 35 years earlier.

== Later developments ==
In 2013, Australian TV network Seven Network announced that it would produce a miniseries focusing on the band's behind-the-scenes stories. The miniseries was called INXS: Never Tear Us Apart. Band member Tim Farriss was a pre-production consultant on the show. The miniseries premiered on 9 February 2014; the finale aired on 16 February 2014. The miniseries rated very highly and created a renewed interest in the band, which translated to a resurgence in sales of their music that brought them once again to the number one position on the Australian popular music charts.

In 2019, a documentary film about Michael Hutchence was released; the film was entitled Mystify. A soundtrack was also released featuring INXS tracks.

== Band members ==
Founding members
- Tim Farriss – lead guitar, occasional backing vocals (1977–2012)
- Kirk Pengilly – rhythm guitar, saxophone, backing vocals (1977–2012), lead vocals (1997–2000)
- Garry Gary Beers – bass, backing vocals (1977–2012)
- Andrew Farriss – keyboards, harmonica (1977–2012), rhythm guitar, percussion, backing vocals (1984–2012), lead vocals (1997–2000)
- Jon Farriss – drums (1977–2012), percussion (1981–2012), backing vocals (1982–2012)
- Michael Hutchence – lead vocals (1977–1997; his death)

Other members

- Jon Stevens – lead vocals (2000–2003)
- J.D. Fortune – lead vocals (2005–2011)
- Ciaran Gribbin – lead vocals, rhythm guitar (2011–2012)
Former touring musicians
- Jenny Morris – backing vocals (1985–1986)
- Suze DeMarchi – lead vocals (2000)

== Discography ==
- INXS (1980)
- Underneath the Colours (1981)
- Shabooh Shoobah (1982)
- The Swing (1984)
- Listen Like Thieves (1985)
- Kick (1987)
- X (1990)
- Welcome to Wherever You Are (1992)
- Full Moon, Dirty Hearts (1993)
- Elegantly Wasted (1997)
- Switch (2005)
- Original Sin (2010)

== Legacy ==
INXS have been cited as an influence by acts including the 1975, Maroon 5, and Savage Garden.

According to the Recording Industry Association of America (RIAA), INXS have sold over 30 million albums in the United States alone, making them the third-highest selling Australian music act in the United States behind AC/DC and the Bee Gees. They have sold over 50 million records worldwide.

In 2026, INXS were nominated for the Rock and Roll Hall of Fame. They were not inducted.

== Awards ==
INXS have been nominated for numerous music awards, including ARIA Awards, Grammy Awards, and MTV Video Music Awards.

=== APRA Music Awards ===
Year	Nominee / work	Award	Result	Ref.
1988	"What You Need"	Gold Award	Won	
1989	"Need You Tonight"	Gold Award	Won	
1990	"Devil Inside"	Gold Award	Won	
1990	"New Sensation"	Gold Award	Won	
1991	"Suicide Blonde"	Most Performed Australian Work Overseas	Won	
1992	"Disappear"	Most Performed Australian Work Overseas	Won	
2002	"Precious Heart" (with Tall Paul)	Most Performed Dance Work	Nominated	
2026	INXS	Ted Albert Award for Outstanding Services	awarded	

=== ARIA Awards ===
INXS have won six Australian Recording Industry Association (ARIA) Awards. In addition, the band were inducted into the ARIA Hall of Fame in 2001 alongside the Saints. The induction recognised their achievement of a "significant body of recorded work" and that they "had a cultural impact within Australia". INXS have won six other ARIA Awards, including three for 'Best Group' in 1987, 1989 and 1992.

Year	Nominee / work	Award	Result
1987	"Listen Like Thieves"	Best Group	Won
1987	"Good Times" (INXS & Jimmy Barnes)	Single of the Year	Nominated
1987	"Good Times" (INXS & Jimmy Barnes)	Highest Selling Single	Nominated
1988	INXS	Best Group	Nominated
1989	INXS	Outstanding Achievement Award	awarded
1989	"Never Tear Us Apart"	Best Video (Note: The video was directed by Richard Lowenstein.)	Won
1989	"Never Tear Us Apart"	Best Group	Won
1989	"Never Tear Us Apart"	Single of the Year	Nominated
1991	X	Album of the Year	Nominated
1991	X	Best Group	Nominated
1992	Live Baby Live	Best Group	Won
1993	"Baby Don't Cry", "Heaven Sent", "Taste It" (Note: Nomination to Niven Garland for engineering INXS tracks "Baby Don't Cry", "Heaven Sent" and "Taste It".)	Engineer of the Year	Nominated
1993	Welcome to Wherever You Are	Best Group	Nominated
1994	"The Gift" (Note: The video was directed by Richard Lowenstein.)	Best Video	Won
1994	"The Gift"	Highest Selling Single	Nominated
1994	Full Moon, Dirty Hearts	Best Group	Nominated
2001	INXS	Hall of Fame	inducted
2004	I'm Only Looking	Best Music DVD	Nominated

=== ASCAP Pop Music Awards ===
Year	Nominee / work	Award	Result	Ref.
1987	"What You Need"	Most Performed Songs	Won	
1989	"Devil Inside"	Most Performed Songs	Won	
1989	"New Sensation"	Most Performed Songs	Won	
1989	"Never Tear Us Apart"	Most Performed Songs	Won	
1989	"Need You Tonight"	Most Performed Songs	Won	
1991	"Disappear"	Most Performed Songs	Won	

=== Countdown Awards ===
Countdown was an Australian pop music TV series on national broadcaster ABC-TV from 1974 to 1987, it presented music awards from 1979 to 1987, initially in conjunction with magazine TV Week but then independently. The Countdown Music and Video Awards were succeeded by the ARIA Awards. INXS won seven awards at the 1984 awards ceremony, which was broadcast on 25 May 1985. On 20 April 1986 they won three further Countdown awards for 1985. They won further award in the final awards in 1986, from five nominations.

Year	Nominee / work	Award	Result
1980	INXS	Johnny O'Keefe New Talent	Nominated
1982	Shabooh Shoobah	Best Australian Album	Nominated
1982	"One Thing"	Best Australian Single	Nominated
1982	INXS	Most Popular Group	Nominated
1984	"Burn for You"	Best Group Performance in a Video	Won
1984	The Swing	Best Album	Won
1984	INXS	Most Popular Australian Group	Won
1984	Andrew Farriss, Michael Hutchence	Best Songwriter	Won
1984	"Burn for You" (Note: Award was shared between Richard Lowenstein for the INXS video "Burn for You" and B Sharp Productions for Mental As Anything video "Apocalypso".)	Best Promotional Video	Won
1984	"Burn for You"	Best Single	Nominated
1984	"I Send a Message"	Best Single	Nominated
1984	INXS	Most Outstanding Achievement	Won
1984	Michael Hutchence	Most Popular Male	Won
1985	"What You Need" (Note: Award to Richard Lowenstein and Lynn-Maree Milburn for the INXS video "What You Need".)	Best Video	Won
1985	INXS	Most Popular Australian Group	Won
1985	INXS	Most Outstanding Achievement	Won
1986	"Kiss the Dirt"	Best Group Performance in a Video	Won
1986	"Good Times" (with Jimmy Barnes)	Best Group Performance in a Video	Nominated
1986	"Kiss the Dirt"	Best Video	Nominated
1986	"Listen Like Thieves"	Best Video	Nominated
1986	INXS	Most Popular Australian Group	Nominated

=== Grammy Awards ===
INXS received three Grammy Award nominations.

Year	Nominee / work	Award	Result
1988	Kick	Best Rock Performance by a Duo or Group with Vocal	Nominated
1990	"Suicide Blonde"	Best Rock Performance by a Duo or Group with Vocal	Nominated
1994	"Beautiful Girl"	Best Short Form Music Video	Nominated

=== International Rock Awards ===
The International Rock Awards (1989–91) was a music award ceremony broadcast on ABC Television, to honour the top musicians in the genre of rock music.

Year	Nominee / work	Award	Result
1989	Themselves	Artist of the Year	Nominated

=== Mo Awards ===
The Australian Entertainment Mo Awards (commonly known informally as the Mo Awards), were annual Australian entertainment industry awards. They recognise achievements in live entertainment in Australia from 1975 to 2016. INXS won two awards in that time.

Year	Nominee / work	Award	Result (wins only)
1986	INXS	Rock Group of the Year	Won
1988	INXS	Rock Group of the Year	Won

=== MTV Video Music Awards ===
INXS won five MTV Video Music Awards for their 1988 video "Need You Tonight/Mediate".

Year	Nominee / work	Award	Result
1986	"What You Need"	Best Group Video	Nominated
1988	"Need You Tonight/Mediate"	Viewer's Choice	Won
1988	"Need You Tonight/Mediate"	Video of the Year	Won
1988	"Need You Tonight/Mediate"	Best Group Video	Won
1988	"Need You Tonight/Mediate"	Best Concept Video	Nominated
1988	"Need You Tonight/Mediate"	Breakthrough Video	Won
1988	"Need You Tonight/Mediate"	Best Special Effects in a Video	Nominated
1988	"Need You Tonight/Mediate"	Best Art Direction in a Video	Nominated
1988	"Need You Tonight/Mediate"	Best Editing in a Video	Won
1988	"Devil Inside"	Best Editing in a Video	Nominated
1989	"New Sensation"	Best Art Direction in a Video	Nominated

=== Pollstar Concert Industry Awards ===
The Pollstar Concert Industry Awards is an annual award ceremony to honour artists and professionals in the concert industry.

Year	Nominee / work	Award	Result
1986	Themselves	Next Major Arena Headliner	Nominated
1986	Tour	Small Hall/Club of the Year	Nominated
1989	Tour	Most Creative Stage Production	Nominated

=== Brit Awards ===
Year	Nominee / work	Award	Result
1989	INXS	Best International Group	Nominated
1991	INXS	Best International Group	Won
1991	Michael Hutchence	Best International Male	Won
1992	INXS	Best International Group	Nominated

=== Juno Awards ===
Year	Nominee / work	Award	Result
1989	INXS	International Entertainer of the Year	Nominated

=== World Music Awards ===
Year	Nominee / work	Award	Result
1993	INXS	World's Best Selling Australian Artist	Won

=== Žebřík Music Awards ===
Year	Nominee / work	Award	Result	Ref.
1997	Michael Hutchence	Best International Personality	Nominated	
1997	"Elegantly Wasted"	Best International Video	Nominated	
1997	The Death of Michael Hutchence	Best International Průser	Nominated	
