= The Very Best (INXS album) =

Greatest hits album by INXS
- Released: 21 October 2011
- Recorded: 1980–2011
- Genres: Rock; alternative rock; new wave; post-punk; hard rock
- Length: 1:16:26
- Label: Universal Music Australia

INXS chronology
Original Sin (2010)	The Very Best (2011)	Live at Wembley Stadium 1991 (2014)

The Very Best is a greatest hits album released by Australian band INXS in 2011. It initially peaked at number 39 in Australia.

Following the screening of INXS: Never Tear Us Apart, an Australian miniseries about INXS that commenced on 9 February 2014 on the Seven Network, the album re-entered the charts, peaking at number one. When the miniseries screened in New Zealand in August 2014, the album also charted, similarly peaking at number one.

== Track listing ==
The album was released in two formats; a single-disc version and a double-disc version with a DVD. The first disc of the deluxe edition is the same as the standard edition.

Standard edition
No.	Title	Writer(s)	Original album	Length
1.	"Need You Tonight"	Michael Hutchence, Andrew Farriss	Kick (1987)	3:03
2.	"Mystify"	Michael Hutchence, Andrew Farriss	Kick (1987)	3:19
3.	"Suicide Blonde"	Michael Hutchence, Andrew Farriss	X (1990)	3:53
4.	"Taste It"	Michael Hutchence, Andrew Farriss	Welcome to Wherever You Are (1992)	3:20
5.	"Original Sin"	Michael Hutchence, Andrew Farriss	The Swing (1984)	5:18
6.	"Heaven Sent"	Andrew Farriss	Welcome to Wherever You Are (1992)	3:20
7.	"Disappear"	Michael Hutchence, Jon Farriss	X (1990)	4:10
8.	"Never Tear Us Apart"	Michael Hutchence, Andrew Farriss	Kick (1987)	3:05
9.	"The Gift"	Michael Hutchence, Jon Farriss	Full Moon, Dirty Hearts (1993)	4:04
10.	"Devil Inside"	Michael Hutchence, Andrew Farriss	Kick (1987)	5:15
11.	"Beautiful Girl"	Andrew Farriss	Welcome to Wherever You Are (1992)	3:29
12.	"By My Side"	Andrew Farriss, Kirk Pengilly	X (1990)	3:06
13.	"Kiss the Dirt (Falling Down the Mountain)"	Michael Hutchence, Andrew Farriss	Listen Like Thieves (1985)	3:55
14.	"Elegantly Wasted"	Michael Hutchence, Andrew Farriss	Elegantly Wasted (1997)	4:34
15.	"New Sensation"	Michael Hutchence, Andrew Farriss	Kick (1987)	3:41
16.	"What You Need"	Michael Hutchence, Andrew Farriss	Listen Like Thieves (1985)	3:36
17.	"Listen Like Thieves"	Michael Hutchence, Andrew Farriss, Garry Gary Beers, Jon Farriss, Kirk Pengilly, Tim Farriss	Listen Like Thieves (1985)	3:48
18.	"Just Keep Walking"	Michael Hutchence, Andrew Farriss, Garry Gary Beers, Jon Farriss, Kirk Pengilly, Tim Farriss	INXS (1980)	2:44
19.	"Bitter Tears"	Michael Hutchence, Andrew Farriss	X (1990)	3:50
20.	"Baby Don't Cry"	Andrew Farriss	Welcome to Wherever You Are (1992)	4:47
Total length:				76:26

Deluxe edition (Disc 2)
No.	Title	Writer(s)	Original album	Length
1.	"Don't Change"	Michael Hutchence, Andrew Farriss, Garry Gary Beers, Jon Farriss, Kirk Pengilly, Tim Farriss	Shabooh Shoobah (1982)	4:27
2.	"The One Thing"	Michael Hutchence, Andrew Farriss	Shabooh Shoobah (1982)	3:26
3.	"Shining Star"	Andrew Farriss	Live Baby Live (1991)	3:44
4.	"The Stairs"	Michael Hutchence, Andrew Farriss	X (1990)	4:58
5.	"Please (You Got That...)" (with Ray Charles)	Michael Hutchence, Andrew Farriss	Full Moon, Dirty Hearts (1993)	3:04
6.	"Burn For You"	Michael Hutchence, Andrew Farriss	The Swing (1984)	4:59
7.	"I Send a Message"	Michael Hutchence, Andrew Farriss	The Swing (1984)	3:24
8.	"The Loved One"	Gerry Humphrys, Ian Clyne, Rob Lovett	Kick (1987)	3:37
9.	"This Time"	Andrew Farriss	Listen Like Thieves (1985)	3:10
10.	"Shine Like It Does"	Michael Hutchence, Andrew Farriss	Listen Like Thieves (1985)	3:07
11.	"Stay Young"	Michael Hutchence, Andrew Farriss	Underneath the Colours (1981)	3:25
12.	"Kick"	Michael Hutchence, Andrew Farriss	Kick (1987)	3:15
13.	"Calling All Nations"	Michael Hutchence, Andrew Farriss	Kick (1987)	3:05
14.	"To Look at You"	Andrew Farriss	Shabooh Shoobah (1982)	3:58
15.	"Good Times" (with Jimmy Barnes)	Harry Vanda, George Young	The Lost Boys (1987)	3:52
16.	"Need You Tonight" (mash-up; INXS vs. Gwen Stefani)	Michael Hutchence, Andrew Farriss, Gwen Stefani, Pharrell Williams, Chad Hugo	Previously unreleased (2006)	3:50
17.	"New Sensation" (live at the Edinburgh Playhouse)	Michael Hutchence, Andrew Farriss	Previously unreleased	4:06
18.	"What You Need" (live at the Edinburgh Playhouse)	Michael Hutchence, Andrew Farriss	Previously unreleased	5:26
19.	"Mystify" (live at the Edinburgh Playhouse)	Michael Hutchence, Andrew Farriss	Previously unreleased	3:29
20.	"Disappear" (live at the Brixton Academy)	Michael Hutchence, Jon Farriss	Previously unreleased	3:57
Total length:				76:29

DVD
No.	Title	Length
1.	"INXS: The Very Best documentary"
2.	"Taste It" (Top of the Pops)
3.	"The Strangest Party (These Are the Times)" (Top of the Pops)
4.	"Never Tear Us Apart" (Jools Holland)
5.	"Need You Tonight" (promo)
6.	"New Sensation" (promo)
7.	"Beautiful Girl" (promo)
8.	"Suicide Blonde" (promo)
9.	"The Gift" (promo)

== Chart performance ==
The Very Best debuted and peaked at number 39 in Australia on 6 November 2011. When promotion began for the mini-series, it re-entered the charts at number 13 on 10 November 2013. With the airing on the mini-series in February 2014, the album slowly rose to number-one on 17 February 2014. It became the first INXS "best of" album to reach number-one in Australia.

The Very Best took 77 weeks before it reached number-one and holds the record for the longest number of weeks to rise to number one, in ARIA chart history.

The Very Best was the highest selling album in Australia by an Australian artist in 2014 and the fourth overall.

== Charts ==
=== Weekly charts ===
Weekly chart performance for The Very Best
Chart (2011–2019)	Peak position
Australian Albums (ARIA)	1
New Zealand Albums (RMNZ)	1
Portuguese Albums (AFP)	27
Scottish Albums (Official Charts)	60

=== Year-end charts ===
Year-end chart performance for The Very Best
Chart	Year	Position
Australian Albums (ARIA)	2013	44
Australian Albums (ARIA)	2014	4
New Zealand Albums (RMNZ)	2014	17
Australian Albums (ARIA)	2015	29
Australian Albums (ARIA)	2016	45
Australian Albums (ARIA)	2017	24
Australian Albums (ARIA)	2018	35
Australian Albums (ARIA)	2019	28
Australian Albums (ARIA)	2020	34
Australian Albums (ARIA)	2021	35
Australian Albums (ARIA)	2022	40
Australian Albums (ARIA)	2023	58
Australian Albums (ARIA)	2024	81
Australian Albums (ARIA)	2025	87

=== Decade-end charts ===
Decade-end chart performance for The Very Best
Chart (2010–2019)	Position
Australian Albums (ARIA)	11
Australian Artist Albums (ARIA)	1

== Certifications ==
Certifications for The Very Best
Region	Certification	Certified units/sales
Australia (ARIA)	8× Platinum	560,000^{‡}
New Zealand (RMNZ)	Platinum	15,000^{^}
United Kingdom (BPI)	Platinum	300,000^{‡}
^{^} Shipments figures based on certification alone.^{‡} Sales+streaming figures based on certification alone.

== See also ==
- List of number-one albums of 2014 (Australia)
