= Live at Wembley Stadium 1991 =

2014 live album by INXS

Live album by INXS
- Released: 7 February 2014
- Recorded: 13 July 1991
- Venue: Wembley Stadium
- Genre: Rock
- Label: Petrol Electric

INXS live chronology
The Very Best (2011)	Live at Wembley Stadium 1991 (2014)	Live at the US Festival 1983 (Shabooh Shoobah) (2022)

Live at Wembley Stadium 1991 is a live album recorded by Australian band INXS during their Live Baby Live tour. It was released in February 2014.

== Background and release ==
On 13 July 1991, INXS were filmed in concert at Wembley Stadium in London, performing to a sold-out mass of 72,000 fans. This concert was filmed in 35 mm and directed by David Mallet with no less than 17 cameras.

The album was released in February 2014 to coincide with the screening of INXS: Never Tear Us Apart, an Australian miniseries about INXS that commenced airing on 9 February 2014 and concluded the following week on 16 February on the Seven Network.

A fully restored film edition of the Wembley Stadium performance was released in 2019, with CD and vinyl editions.

== Track listing ==
The album was released as a digital download on 7 February 2014.

No.	Title	Length
1.	"Guns in the Sky"	3:27
2.	"New Sensation"	3:54
3.	"I Send a Message"	3:41
4.	"The Stairs"	4:59
5.	"Know the Difference"	3:47
6.	"Disappear"	4:12
7.	"By My Side"	3:10
8.	"Hear That Sound"	3:44
9.	"Original Sin"	6:17
10.	"The Loved One"	4:06
11.	"Wildlife"	3:32
12.	"Mystify"	3:18
13.	"Bitter Tears"	4:12
14.	"Suicide Blonde"	4:32
15.	"What You Need"	6:30
16.	"Kick"	3:30
17.	"Need You Tonight"	2:57
18.	"Mediate"	5:32
19.	"Never Tear Us Apart"	3:47
20.	"Who Pays the Price"	3:39
21.	"Devil Inside"	7:13
22.	"Shining Star" (studio recording)	3:40

== Personnel ==
INXS

- Michael Hutchence – lead vocals
- Andrew Farriss – keyboards, guitars, backing vocals
- Tim Farriss – guitars, backing vocals
- Kirk Pengilly – guitars, saxophone, backing vocals
- Garry Gary Beers – bass, backing vocals
- Jon Farriss – drums, percussion, backing vocals

== Charts ==
Chart (2014)	Peak position
Australian Albums (ARIA)	17
New Zealand Albums (RMNZ)	40

== See also ==
- INXS discography
- Live Baby Live
