= Live Baby Live =

1991 live album by INXS

Live album by INXS
- Released: 4 November 1991
- Recorded: Paris, New York, Toronto, Chicago, London, Dublin, Glasgow, Rio De Janeiro, Montreal, Spain, Switzerland, Melbourne, Sydney, Philadelphia, Las Vegas (original release)
- Genre: Rock
- Length: 63:47 (original album); 94:05 (first reissue); 96:58 (second reissue)
- Label: East West Records
- Producers: Mark Opitz, INXS

INXS chronology
X (1990)	Live Baby Live (1991)	Welcome to Wherever You Are (1992)

Singles from Live Baby Live
- 1. "Shining Star" Released: 21 October 1991; 2. "The Stairs" Released: November 1991 (NL)

Live Baby Live is the first live album by Australian rock band INXS. It was released on 4 November 1991 and features tracks recorded during their Summer XS Tour in Paris, New York, Chicago, London, Dublin, Glasgow, Rio de Janeiro, Montreal, Spain, Switzerland, Melbourne, Sydney, Philadelphia, and Las Vegas. The album peaked in the top 10 on both the Australian and United Kingdom albums charts. It has sold over one million copies in the United States, earning a platinum certification by the RIAA. A single, "Shining Star", was released from and ahead of the album on 21 October. It became the group's ninth Top 40 single on the UK Singles Chart, but failed to appear on the Billboard Hot 100 in the US, despite reaching the top 20 of the rock charts.

The title's two uses of 'live', indistinguishable by spelling alone, are pronounced differently – according to The Greatest Hits album's accompanying booklet – the first is pronounced to rhyme with 'give', whereas the second is pronounced as in 'five'. The name is a play on the first line of "New Sensation".

== Background ==
In September 1990, Australian rock band, INXS released their seventh studio album, X, which was produced by Chris Thomas (Sex Pistols, Pink Floyd, The Pretenders, Elton John) and it peaked at No. 3 in Australia, No. 2 in the United Kingdom, No. 5 in the United States, No. 5 in Switzerland and No. 10 in Sweden. It followed in the same vein as Kick (1987), and added harmonica to some songs. X scored hits with "Suicide Blonde" and "Disappear" (both Top 10 in the US), "Suicide Blonde" peaked at No. 2 in Australia, No. 11 in the UK and in Switzerland. Other singles from X were "Bitter Tears" and "By My Side" but they had less chart success.

Lead singer Michael Hutchence's romance with Australian pop singer Kylie Minogue brought the group a new audience of fans. INXS performed at Wembley Stadium on 13 July 1991, during their Summer XS Tour stop in London to a sold-out audience of 74,000 fans. This performance was recorded and filmed to become their live album Live Baby Live (a video version was also released under the same title), which was released on 11 November 1991 and peaked in the Top 30 of both the Australian and UK albums charts, but had less success on the Billboard 200. The album was co-produced by Mark Opitz and INXS.

== Reception ==
Professional ratings
Review scores
Source	Rating
AllMusic	1/5 stars
(The New) Rolling Stone Album Guide	3.5/5 stars

Controversially, Ian Meldrum questioned the validity of the album's 'live' status. AllMusic gave the album one star out of five. AllMusic's reviewer, Stephen Thomas Erlewine, was unimpressed with Live Baby Live, "[it] is a lifeless live album ... All of the performances sound like the studio versions, stripped of their excitement and savvy productions". Danny Scott of Select magazine called the album "pompous and larger than life" and gave it 4 out of 5 stars, concluding: "INXS are deservedly massive the world over, and this is why." The album reached No. 3 on the ARIA Albums Chart and No. 8 on the UK Albums Chart but was less popular in the United States, peaking at No. 72 on the Billboard 200. Nevertheless, the album was certified platinum by RIAA for sales of over one million copies.

The album's only single, "Shining Star", appeared ahead of the album on 2 November. It is the one new song recorded for the album and peaked at No. 21 on the ARIA Singles Chart, at No. 27 on the UK Singles Chart, becoming the group's ninth Top 40 single there. In the US, it peaked at No. 4 on the Modern Rock Tracks and No. 14 on the Mainstream Rock Tracks charts, but failed to appear on the Billboard Hot 100.

== Track listing ==
All tracks are written by Andrew Farriss and Michael Hutchence, unless otherwise noted.

No.	Title	Writer(s)	Length
1.	"New Sensation"		4:42
2.	"Guns in the Sky"	Hutchence	3:14
3.	"Mystify"		3:11
4.	"By My Side"	Farriss; Hutchence; Chris Thomas	3:15
5.	"Shining Star"	Farriss	3:52
6.	"Need You Tonight"		2:58
7.	"Mediate"	Farriss	4:29
8.	"One x One"		2:58
9.	"Burn for You"		4:43
10.	"The One Thing"		3:21
11.	"This Time"	Farriss	3:06
12.	"The Stairs"		5:07
13.	"Suicide Blonde"		4:36
14.	"Hear That Sound"		3:38
15.	"Never Tear Us Apart"		4:13
16.	"What You Need"		6:16
Total length:			63:39

== Personnel ==
INXS

- Michael Hutchence – lead vocals
- Andrew Farriss – keyboards, guitars, harmonica, percussion, backing vocals
- Tim Farriss – guitars, backing vocals
- Kirk Pengilly – guitars, saxophone, backing vocals
- Garry Gary Beers – bass, backing vocals
- Jon Farriss – drums, backing vocals

== Video release ==
=== Wembley Stadium ===
Live Baby Live is a live video of INXS's performance at Wembley Stadium directed by David Mallet. It was released simultaneously as the live CD of the same name. The concert was the second-last of a string of concerts in London for INXS's Summer XS Tour. The live video included almost the complete performance, with "Lately" (originally played after "Original Sin") being edited out. The video was re-released as a DVD in 2003 and was digitally remixed and mastered in 5.1 surround sound by Michael Costa. The band played to a sold-out crowd of over 72,000 fans. Special features include band interviews and backstage footage. The performance was held on 13 July 1991, on the six-year anniversary of the original Live Aid at the same venue. The video footage was shot with sixteen 35 mm cameras that included one in a helicopter that circled the venue. Amazon.com's editorial reviewer, Tom Keogh, felt "fans can rejoice over the release of this buoyant concert film ... the late Michael Hutchence, is at his feral-romantic best, stalking and swiveling his way through an energized set of welterweight pop". Australian country musician Steve Forde declared, "I missed out on seeing Michael do his thing in person, but that Live Baby Live DVD is bad ass! We put that DVD on the big screen in the front lounge of the tour bus. It's like going to a 101 class to be a frontman rock star. Wembley Stadium chock full, singing every word. Awesome. My favourite track from that set is definitely 'Devil Inside'. Is he still relevant? Absolutely".

=== Video track listing ===
1. "Guns in the Sky"
2. "New Sensation"
3. "I Send a Message"
4. "The Stairs"
5. "Know the Difference"
6. "Disappear"
7. "By My Side"
8. "Hear That Sound"
9. "Original Sin"
10. "The Loved One"
11. "Wild Life"
12. "Mystify"
13. "Bitter Tears"
14. "Suicide Blonde"
15. "What You Need"
16. "Kick"
17. "Need You Tonight"
18. "Mediate"
19. "Never Tear Us Apart"
20. "Who Pays the Price"
21. "Devil Inside"
22. "Shining Star"

== Theatrical release ==
INXS: Live Baby Live
- Directed by: David Mallet
- Produced by: Rosie Holley
- Starring: Michael Hutchence; Andrew Farriss; Jon Farriss; Kirk Pengilly; Tim Farriss; Garry Gary Beers
- Cinematography: Adrian Wild
- Edited by: Kyle Smart
- Music by: INXS
- Production companies: Eagle Rock Films; Petrol Records
- Distributed by: Cinevents (U.K.); Fathom Events; (International)
- Release dates: 14 November 2019 (Australia); 27 November 2019 (United Kingdom)
- Running time: 100 minutes
- Country: United Kingdom
- Language: English
- Box office: US$370,361

In 2019 Live Baby Live at Wembley Stadium had been remastered in 4K resolution and cinematic 16:9 widescreen accompanied with newly restored sound at Abbey Road Studios by Giles Martin and Sam Okell presented in a Dolby Atmos mix. Footage for the performance of "Lately" - originally edited out in the 1991 and 2003 releases - was discovered and was added, being the first time that the full length concert was released with the original setlist, the audio having been previously released as a bonus feature on the DVD release. The film was given a theatrical release for the first time for one-night-only in Australia and New Zealand on 14 November 2019, a U.K., Ireland and continental European release on 27 November and in North and South America on 9 December. A soundtrack for the concert film was released on 15 November on CD, Vinyl, and digital services.

=== Background ===
The film was released on DVD from a 35mm negative, however, INXS manager Chris Murphy had been looking for the original film cans for over a decade. Murphy searched for them in the United States and the United Kingdom; it was eventually discovered in Sydney. During the Ultra HD restoration process, the film was carefully restored shot-by-shot during a twelve-month period.

=== Release ===
Live Baby Live had its world premiere at the Byron Bay International Film Festival in late October 2019. Prior to this, special screenings in July had also taken place including one held in New York City. The concert film was first released in Australia and New Zealand on 14 November 2019 by Fathom Events and in Europe including the U.K., Ireland, Greece, the Netherlands by Cinevents. It is intended to be released on up to 1000 screens worldwide.

A 57-minute edited cut of the restored concert was aired on BBC Two at 11pm on 28 December 2019.

=== Box office ===
INXS: Live Baby Live grossed £48,161 ($62,312) in the United Kingdom and $307,818 in other territories, for a total worldwide gross of $370,361.

=== Home media ===
Eagle Rock Entertainment released the concert film in the US and Canada on DVD and Blu-ray Disc and in the United Kingdom on DVD, Blu-ray and 4K Ultra HD, alongside Blu-ray and DVD editions packaged with the CD soundtrack on 26 June 2020.

=== 2019 remastered track listing ===
Unlike the original release, this is solely taken from a Wembley Stadium date.

1. "Guns in the Sky"
2. "New Sensation"
3. "I Send a Message"
4. "The Stairs"
5. "Know the Difference"
6. "Disappear"
7. "By My Side"
8. "Hear That Sound"
9. "Original Sin"
10. "Lately"
11. "The Loved One"
12. "Wild Life"
13. "Mystify"
14. "Bitter Tears"
15. "Suicide Blonde"
16. "What You Need"
17. "Kick"
18. "Need You Tonight"
19. "Mediate"
20. "Never Tear Us Apart"
21. "Who Pays the Price"
22. "Devil Inside"

Notes

- The 2019 standalone CD and digital editions of the soundtrack do not feature "Shining Star", which features on the end credits and on the original album and first reissue (minus "Lately"), but is included in the editions packaged with the Blu-ray and DVD releases.

== Charts and certifications ==
=== Charts ===
Chart (1991–1992)	Peak position
Australian Albums (ARIA)	3
Austrian Albums (Ö3 Austria)	25
Canadian Albums (RPM)	36
Dutch Albums (Album Top 100)	26
French Albums (SNEP)	31
German Albums (Offizielle Top 100)	18
New Zealand Albums (RMNZ)	31
Swedish Albums (Sverigetopplistan)	39
Swiss Albums (Schweizer Hitparade)	15
UK Albums (Official Charts)	8
US Billboard 200	72

=== Certifications ===
Region	Certification	Certified units/sales
Australia (ARIA)	Platinum	70,000^{^}
Switzerland (IFPI Switzerland)	Gold	25,000^{^}
United States (RIAA)	Platinum	1,000,000^{^}
^{^} Shipments figures based on certification alone.

=== Live Baby Live DVD ===
Region	Certification	Certified units/sales
Australia (ARIA)	3× Platinum	45,000^{^}
^{^} Shipments figures based on certification alone.

=== Live Baby Live Wembley Stadium ===
Chart (2020)	Peak position
Swiss Music DVD Chart (Hitparade)	2
UK Official Music Video Chart (OCC)	2
