= Original Sin (INXS album) =

Studio album by INXS
- Released: 28 October 2010
- Recorded: 2009–2010
- Genre: Alternative rock
- Length: 49:37
- Labels: Petrol Electric; Polydor (France); Atco (US); Groove Merchants (Australia); Epic (Canada)
- Producers: Jon Farriss; James Ash; INXS

INXS chronology
Switch (2005)	Original Sin (2010)	The Very Best (2011)

Professional ratings
Review scores
Source	Rating
AllMusic	3/5 stars

Original Sin is the twelfth and final studio album by the Australian rock band INXS. It was released on physical media on 16 November 2010 by Epic Records, Atco Records and Polydor after having been released digitally on 28 October 2010. Original Sin features covers of their earlier songs, with each song featuring a guest singer. J.D. Fortune, who was the winner of the Rock Star: INXS competition and featured on the band's previous album Switch, performed lead vocals for the 1990 track "The Stairs", being the last contribution from Fortune before his departure in 2011.

== Background ==
Described as a tribute album by the band members, the record features new recordings of INXS songs. "We've re-invented these songs. Some have been done by an orchestra, some [are] stripped down and some tracks may take you [a while] to recognise what it is", said Jon Farriss.

A review in QRO Magazine gave the album a 5/10 rating. The album charted at number 49 on the Australian Albums Chart.

The album was re-issued in 2011 by Atco Records for the US market. This version features an alternative version of track four "Never Tear Us Apart", the French lyric and vocal duet between Ben Harper and Mylène Farmer is replaced with a solo vocal by Harper.

== Track listing ==
All tracks are written by Andrew Farriss and Michael Hutchence, except where noted.

International release
No.	Title	Writer(s)	Vocals	Length
1.	"Drum Opera"	Jon Farriss		2:56
2.	"Mediate"	A. Farriss	Tricky	4:08
3.	"Original Sin"		Rob Thomas and DJ Yaleidys	4:20
4.	"Never Tear Us Apart"	A. Farriss; Hutchence; Mylène Farmer (French lyrics)	Ben Harper and Mylène Farmer (US reissue features Harper on vocals only)	3:57
5.	"Beautiful Girl"		Pat Monahan	4:08
6.	"New Sensation"		Deborah de Corral	3:42
7.	"Just Keep Walking"		Dan Sultan	2:42
8.	"Mystify"		Loane and John Mayer	5:49
9.	"To Look at You"	A. Farriss	Kav Temperley	3:59
10.	"Kick"		Nikka Costa	5:10
11.	"Don't Change"	Garry Gary Beers; A. Farriss; Jon Farriss; Tim Farriss; Hutchence; Kirk Pengilly	Andrew Farriss and Kirk Pengilly	4:15
12.	"The Stairs"		J.D. Fortune	4:31
Total length:				49:37

Bonus tracks
No.	Title	Writer(s)	Vocals	Length
13.	"Love Is (What I Say)"	Beers; A. Farriss; Hutchence; Pengilly; Anthony Braxton-Smith	J.D. Fortune	3:50
14.	"Never Tear Us Apart" (orchestral instrumental)			3:50

iTunes and Australian deluxe edition bonus track
No.	Title	Vocals	Length
13.	"Devil Inside" (released as track 8 on Australian deluxe edition)	Ben Harper and Nikka Costa	5:25

== Personnel ==
- Garry Gary Beers – bass
- Andrew Farriss – keyboards, guitar, vocals on "Don't Change"
- Jon Farriss – drums, percussion, vocals
- Tim Farriss – guitar
- J.D. Fortune – vocals on "The Stairs"
- Kirk Pengilly – guitar, saxophone, vocals
