= X (INXS album) =

Studio album by INXS
- Released: 25 September 1990
- Recorded: 1989–1990
- Studio: Rhinoceros 2 (Sydney, Australia), AIR (London, UK)
- Genre: Alternative rock, pop rock, dance-rock
- Length: 41:42
- Label: WEA
- Producer: Chris Thomas

INXS chronology
| Kick (1987) | X (1990) | Live Baby Live (1991) |

Singles from X
- 1. "Suicide Blonde" Released: 22 August 1990; 2. "Disappear" Released: 26 November 1990; 3. "Bitter Tears" Released: 18 February 1991; 4. "By My Side" Released: 18 March 1991

X is the seventh studio album by Australian rock band INXS, released on 25 September 1990 through WEA in Australia, Mercury Records in Europe, and Atlantic Records in the United States and Canada. The follow-up to the massive seller Kick, X scored hits with "Suicide Blonde" and "Disappear" (both Top 10 in the US). Both singles were later used in the soundtrack to the 1991 American teen comedy Mystery Date. Two other singles from X were "Bitter Tears" and "By My Side" but they had less chart success. A fifth single, "The Stairs", was only issued in the Netherlands to coincide with the release of the Live Baby Live album.

X was the third consecutive INXS album produced by Chris Thomas. The title, the Roman numeral for "10", represents the band's tenth year since their debut album was released in 1980. X features a sample of blues-harp player Charlie Musselwhite on "Suicide Blonde", and Musselwhite himself playing on "Who Pays the Price" and "On My Way". In 2002, a remastered version of the album was released, which included five previously unreleased tracks.

== Background ==
INXS gained great success with the release of their previous studio album, Kick. The multimillion-selling album received critical acclaim and proved to be the band's biggest selling album by far, having gone platinum multiple times. In 1987 and 1988, INXS toured heavily in support of Kick.

During 1989, the band took a break to work on side projects. Vocalist and primary songwriter Michael Hutchence collaborated with Ian 'Ollie' Olsen in the band Max Q, the two having previously worked together on Richard Lowenstein's film Dogs in Space. The remaining members of INXS also got involved in other musical projects, including songwriter and multi-instrumentalist Andrew Farriss, who joined singer-songwriter Jenny Morris in the studio to produce her second solo album, Shiver. Bass guitarist Gary Garry Beers collaborated with ARIA award-winning Sydney band Absent Friends during 1989. Beers first toured with the group, and later recorded tracks for their debut album, Here's Looking Up Your Address. Drummer Jon Farriss joined the recording sessions, contributing percussion on one track. Guitarist and saxophonist Kirk Pengilly, along with lead guitarist Tim Farriss, both paired up to help produce an album for local Sydney band, Crash Politics.

Upon entering the 1990s, INXS wanted to follow up on Kick, their multimillion-selling international success. In a radio interview shortly after the release of X, Hutchence said, "We had to follow-up (on Kick) otherwise we'd disappear".

== Recording and production ==
The band worked again with producer Chris Thomas at the new Rhinoceros studio in Sydney, Australia. Regarding the new studio, Thomas felt that it imposed a different feeling on the band's sound, which reflected in the album's material. In a 2002 interview, Thomas commented, "We worked at the new Rhinoceros studio, which was ridiculously enormous. To some degree, it forced isolation on everything, including the control room. To get a vibe on playback, you had to turn everything up really loud because the room was so big".

Most of the material for X was written by the songwriting duo of Andrew Farriss and Michael Hutchence with the exception of "Disappear", "Faith in Each Other" and "Deepest Red" (excluded from the album), which were written by Hutchence and Jon Farriss, whereas "By My Side" was a collaboration between Andrew and Kirk Pengilly. According to the album's liner notes, Thomas assisted in arranging the song's composition, specifically the chorus; the song's original demo, under the title "Dark of Night", with alternate lyrics was released on the album's 2002 remaster. Some songs that appear on the album were in fact written years prior, including "Lately" and "Disappear" - the lyrics for "Lately" were originally written by Andrew during the recording sessions of the group's fifth studio album, Listen Like Thieves, while Hutchence and Jon wrote the lyrics for "Disappear" when they were living in Hong Kong in 1989.

An idea that Andrew suggested to Hutchence and the rest of the band was the sound of a Blues harp. After discovering Blues musician Charlie Musselwhite had been touring Australia, the band met with him and decided to use his harmonica playing talent on the album. For "Suicide Blonde", the band used samples of Musslewhite's playing rather than recording with the band in the studio; he does play traditional harmonica on "Who Pays the Price" and "On My Way".

Like the band's two previous studio albums produced by Thomas, X features a slickness and polish in its production, a quality that was removed during production of subsequent albums. It was also the group's last studio album produced by Thomas. Their next collaboration was four years later on the recording of both "The Strangest Party (These Are the Times)" and "Deliver Me", which were two new songs that appeared on the band's Greatest Hits compilation released in 1994.

== Music and lyrics ==
Sticking to the formula that was built on Kick, Thomas urged primary songwriters Andrew Farriss and Hutchence to condense their song writing strengths on X. According to the liner notes on the album's 2002 remaster, Thomas stated, "Everything about INXS this time around was grandiose, and this was reflected in the material". He added, "The album got away from the funky stuff and was moving towards the epic on tracks like "Lately" and "The Stairs". Paul Evans of Rolling Stone summed up the changes with "[INXS] focus their strengths, coming up not only with tough, state-of-the-art pop but with the casual confidence of a mature collective personality". Regarding the recorded material, Evans observed that "the record blends R&B; and rock as INXS always has done – but this time the grooves are more solid, the energy and moods less disparate".

Similar to the themes that were explored on Kick, X continues to reflect on the band's personal experiences about relationships and daily life, while touching on social topics such as media, fame and society. The title and lyrics to "Suicide Blonde" came from a phrase that Hutchence first heard used by his then-girlfriend Kylie Minogue, while "Disappear" describes how [Hutchence] is flushed with anxiety when he sees what's going on in the world, but all those problems and fears are cast aside when he's with the one he loves. Hutchence asserted that "The Stairs", a song about singular city life, was the most ambitious song he had ever written; the song describes how tens of millions lead daily lives separated by walls mere inches apart yet never meet. Andrew was inspired to write "By My Side" for his wife, Shelly, and said that the song is about "missing family and people while being on the road". Regarding the lyrics to "Hear That Sound", Hutchence commented, "it is about the power of people, more particularly in large crowds or in marches for the purpose of peaceful protest or celebration".

== Reception ==
Professional ratings
Review scores
| Source | Rating |
|---|---|
| AllMusic | 3.5/5 stars |
| Calgary Herald | B+ |
| Chicago Tribune | 3.5/4 stars |
| The Daily Vault | B+ |
| Dayton Daily News | 3.5/4 stars |
| The Lennox Herald | 9/10 |
| MusicHound Rock | 3.5/5 |
| Q | 3/5 stars |
| (The New)Rolling Stone Album Guide | 3.5/5 stars |
| Select | 1/5 medals |

While reviews for X were generally favourable, with some critics commenting that INXS had stepped up their game, others felt that the album followed too much in the same formula as Kick. AllMusic's Steven McDonald mentions this in the beginning of his review, stating "The seventh album from Australia's INXS basically sticks to the formula set up on Kick, mixing solid remixable dance floor beats with slightly quirky production tricks, Michael Hutchence's rough-edged, bluesy vocals, and some good solid song hooks".

In his 1990 review for Rolling Stone, music critic Paul Evans rated the album four stars out of five and called X the band's "best and most cohesive album". He added, "X is greater than the sum of its parts. It defines the band and clarifies the fullness of its appeal".

Double J (radio station) Their 50 Best Australian albums of the 90's, they included X at #45." Q (magazine) "Wrote" - 3 Stars - Good - listed X in their 50 best albums of 1990." Record Mirror's Robin Smith initiated that the album, isnt't all raunchy rock - not by a long chalk. 'Disappear' and 'The Stairs' shimmer into view, both trim tunes with understated yet memorable choruses and mellow ideas, the disc was given a 5 out of 5 "Perfect Rating"

Radio X (United Kingdom) Placed X at #19, on their list of the 25 best indie albums of 1990." Smash Hits Marc Andrews, called the album "Pretty Good" giving it a 7 out of 10 on the rating scale." Spin (magazine)'s Al Shipley also Put X in his list of the 30 Great Albums of 1990, That Deserve Their Own 30th Anniversary Pieces."

=== Commercial performance ===
Even though the album and its singles did not exceed the success of Kick, it did perform well worldwide, particularly in Europe; In the United Kingdom, the album peaked at number 2 on the UK Albums Chart. In total, it remained in the UK charts for an impressive 44 weeks. The album was certified platinum in January 1991 by the British Phonographic Industry (BPI) for sales in excess of 300,000 copies. X proved successful across Europe, reaching number 5 in Switzerland, number 7 in France, number 9 in (Germany), number 10 in Sweden and number 13 in Norway. The album quickly received gold accreditations in all these regions, subsequently attaining platinum status in both France and Switzerland.

In the band's native Australia, X entered at number 1 on the Australian Albums Chart on 21 October 1990, remaining at the top spot for two weeks. It was present for a total of 34 weeks on the chart. In New Zealand, the album peaked at number 2 on the RIANZ Chart, staying on the chart for 23 weeks. X was certified double platinum by the Australian Recording Industry Association (ARIA) and platinum by the Recording Industry Association of New Zealand (RIANZ) for shipments of 140,000 and 15,000 units respectively.

In the United States, X peaked at number 5 on the Billboard Top 200 on 20 October 1990. Similar to the United Kingdom, the album spent a total of 43 weeks in the charts. Less than two months after its release, X was certified gold by the Recording Industry Association of America (RIAA) on 13 November 1990 for shipments of 500,000 units. The album became double platinum on 16 December 1997 for sales of two million copies in the United States. X was also certified double platinum in Canada in February 1991 for shipments of 200,000 units.

== Track listing ==
All tracks are written by Andrew Farriss and Michael Hutchence, except where noted.

X – Standard edition
| No. | Title | Writer(s) | Length |
|---|---|---|---|
| 1. | "Suicide Blonde" | | 3:53 |
| 2. | "Disappear" | J. Farriss, M. Hutchence | 4:10 |
| 3. | "The Stairs" | | 4:56 |
| 4. | "Faith in Each Other" | J. Farriss, M. Hutchence | 4:09 |
| 5. | "By My Side" | A. Farriss, K. Pengilly | 3:06 |
| 6. | "Lately" | | 3:37 |
| 7. | "Who Pays the Price" | | 3:37 |
| 8. | "Know the Difference" | | 3:18 |
| 9. | "Bitter Tears" | | 3:49 |
| 10. | "On My Way" | | 2:56 |
| 11. | "Hear That Sound" | | 4:05 |

X – 2002 remaster bonus tracks
| No. | Title | Writer(s) | Length |
|---|---|---|---|
| 12. | "Waiting to Be Free" | A. Farriss | 3:11 |
| 13. | "Deepest Red" | J. Farriss, M. Hutchence | 3:24 |
| 14. | "Salvation Jane" (demo) | A. Farriss | 3:22 |
| 15. | "Who Pays the Price" (demo) | | 3:15 |
| 16. | "Dark of Night" (demo) | A. Farriss, K. Pengilly | 2:29 |

== Personnel ==
INXS

- Michael Hutchence – vocals
- Andrew Farriss – keyboards, guitars
- Tim Farriss – guitars
- Garry Gary Beers – bass
- Jon Farriss – drums, keyboards, programming
- Kirk Pengilly – guitars, saxophone, vocals, programming

Additional musician

- Charlie Musselwhite – harmonica (7, 10)

Production

- Chris Thomas – producer
- David Nicholas – engineer
- Brendan Morley – assistant engineer
- Andy Strange – assistant engineer
- Tim Young – mastering
- Tom Bouman – art direction
- Nick Egan – art direction, design
- Michael Halsband – cover photography
- Grant Matthews – inside photography

== Charts and certifications ==
=== Weekly charts ===
Weekly chart performance for X
| Chart (1990–1991) | Peak position |
|---|---|
| Australian Albums (ARIA) | 1 |
| Austrian Albums (Ö3 Austria) | 23 |
| Dutch Albums (Album Top 100) | 9 |
| French Albums (SNEP) | 7 |
| German Albums (Offizielle Top 100) | 9 |
| Hungarian Albums (MAHASZ) | 23 |
| New Zealand Albums (RMNZ) | 2 |
| Norwegian Albums (VG-lista) | 13 |
| Swedish Albums (Sverigetopplistan) | 10 |
| Swiss Albums (Schweizer Hitparade) | 5 |
| UK Albums (OCC) | 2 |
| US Billboard 200 | 5 |

=== Year-end charts ===
1990 year-end chart performance for X
| Chart (1990) | Position |
|---|---|
| Australian Albums (ARIA) | 29 |
| Dutch Albums (Album Top 100) | 83 |

1991 year-end chart performance for X
| Chart (1991) | Position |
|---|---|
| Australian Albums (ARIA) | 39 |
| German Albums (Offizielle Top 100) | 70 |
| US Billboard 200 | 45 |

=== Certifications ===
Certifications for X
| Region | Certification | Certified units/sales |
|---|---|---|
| Australia (ARIA) | 2× Platinum | 140,000^{^} |
| Canada (Music Canada) | 2× Platinum | 200,000^{^} |
| France (SNEP) | Platinum | 300,000^{*} |
| Germany (BVMI) | Gold | 250,000^{^} |
| New Zealand (RMNZ) | Platinum | 15,000^{^} |
| Sweden (GLF) | Gold | 50,000^{^} |
| Switzerland (IFPI Switzerland) | Platinum | 50,000^{^} |
| United Kingdom (BPI) | Platinum | 300,000^{^} |
| United States (RIAA) | 2× Platinum | 2,000,000^{^} |
^{*} Sales figures based on certification alone.^{^} Shipments figures based on certification alone.
