= Kick (INXS album) =

Studio album by INXS
- Released: 12 October 1987
- Recorded: 1986–1987
- Studios: Rhinoceros (Sydney); Studio De La Grande Armée (Paris)
- Genres: New wave; pop rock; funk rock; dance-rock
- Length: 39:50
- Label: WEA
- Producer: Chris Thomas

INXS chronology
Listen Like Thieves (1985)	Kick (1987)	X (1990)

Singles from Kick
- 1. "Need You Tonight" Released: 21 September 1987; 2. "New Sensation" Released: 29 December 1987; 3. "Devil Inside" Released: 8 February 1988; 4. "Never Tear Us Apart" Released: 13 June 1988; 5. "Mystify" Released: 15 March 1989

Kick is the sixth studio album by Australian rock band INXS, released on 12 October 1987 through WEA in Australia, Mercury Records in Europe, and Atlantic Records in the United States and Canada. The album was produced by British producer Chris Thomas, recorded by David Nicholas in Sydney and Paris and mixed by Bob Clearmountain at AIR Studios in London.

The band's most successful studio album, Kick has been certified six times platinum by the RIAA and peaked at number three on the Billboard 200. The album also spawned four US top 10 singles, "New Sensation", "Never Tear Us Apart", "Devil Inside" and "Need You Tonight", the last of which reached the top of the US Billboard singles charts.

== Background ==
Between 1980 and 1984, INXS released four studio albums and had toured their native country Australia extensively. The release of Listen Like Thieves and its second single "What You Need" in 1985 brought the group international acclaim, as well as a breakthrough in the United States. The album peaked at No.11 on the US Billboard 200, and featured the band's first top 5 single in the US, "What You Need". After that success, the band knew their next album would have to be better. According to guitarist and saxophonist Kirk Pengilly, "We wanted an album where all the songs were possible singles". Towards the end of 1986, the band members gathered at the Sydney Opera House in Sydney, Australia to rehearse the songs that Michael Hutchence and Andrew Farriss had written.

== Recording and production ==
In January 1987, INXS entered Rhinoceros Studios in Sydney to begin recording their sixth studio album, and the second with producer Chris Thomas. At the band's request, fellow engineer David Nicholas was brought in to assist with the album's production. Nicholas co-owned Rhinoceros recordings and had previously worked with the band on their 1982 album, Shabooh Shoobah. In the band's 2005 official autobiography, INXS: Story to Story, Nicholas recalled: "There was a really good feeling in the studio that this was going to be something big. The band had just come off a really successful tour of the US on the back of Listen Like Thieves, which really broke them there and they were on fire".

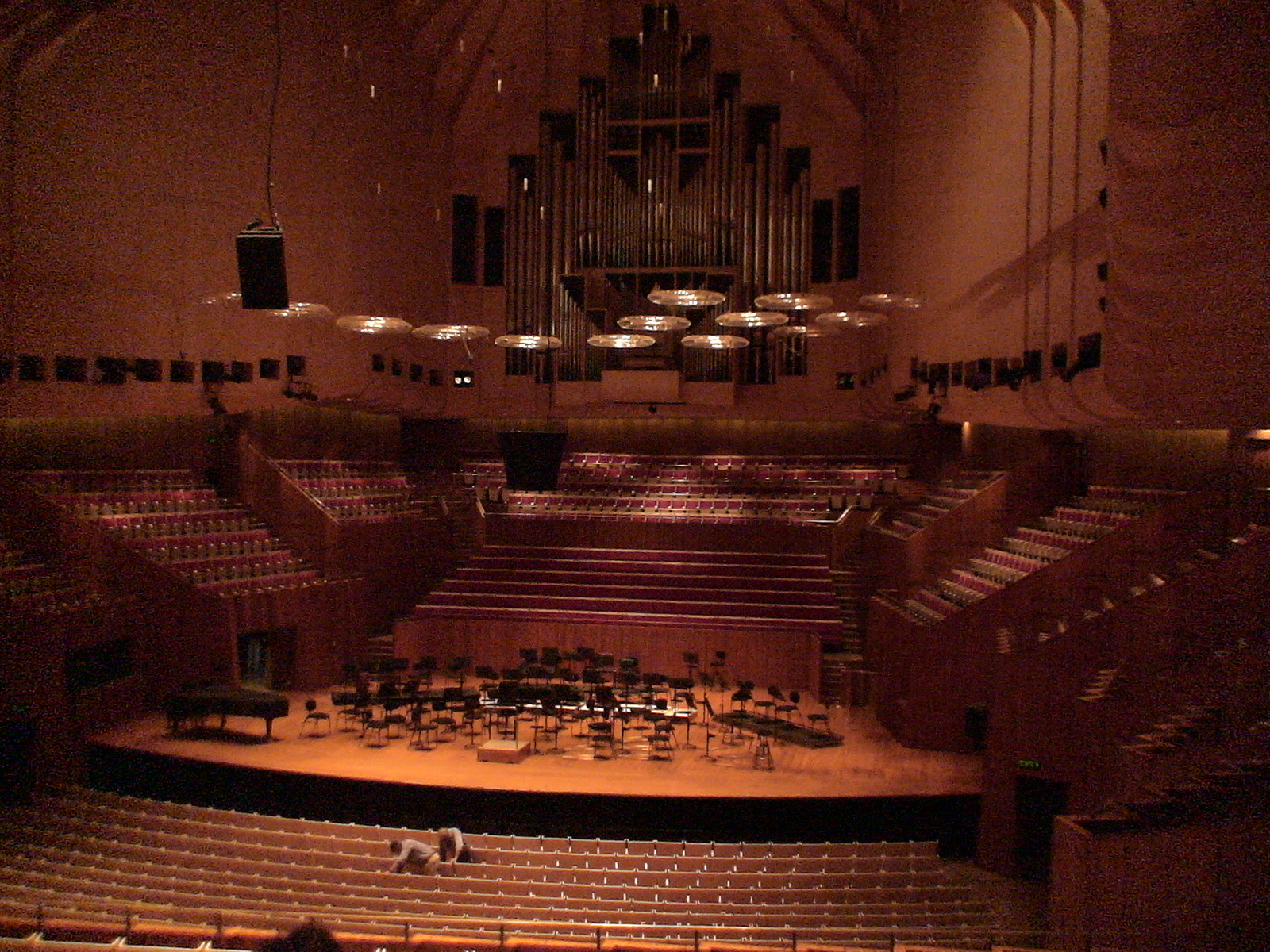
INXS gathered at the Sydney Opera House in Australia to begin the rehearsal sessions for Kick.

During production, management booked dates for the band's upcoming European tour, which proved a problem for Thomas, as he felt the album needed more songs. "They had an incredible momentum building and were gaining fans all the time", Thomas recalls. "There was an audience waiting for the product, but I decided that they didn't have the right songs yet". Thomas persuaded primary songwriters Hutchence and Andrew Farriss to fly to Hong Kong (where Hutchence and drummer Jon Farriss owned an apartment) to write more material for the forthcoming album.

While waiting for a cab to go to the airport to fly to Hong Kong, Andrew thought up the guitar riff for "Need You Tonight". He told the cab driver to wait a couple of minutes while he went back to his motel room to grab something, when in fact, he went back to record the riff on a cassette. The cab driver was furious when Andrew returned to the cab forty-five minutes later. When Hutchence heard the demo in Hong Kong, he wrote the song's lyrics, writing most in just ten minutes.

At the end of their two-week seclusion in Hong Kong, Hutchence and Andrew returned to the recording sessions in Australia with a handful of demo tapes, including "Need You Tonight", "Kick" and "Calling All Nations". Thomas knew the album was done when he heard the recordings, and organised the last portion of the album's production to be carried out at the Studio De La Grande Armee in Paris.

While Kick had been considered as the album's name during the recording sessions in Australia, when the word appeared in a couple of tracks, a song of the same name was written in Hong Kong and it was chosen for certain. There was also the appeal that the word had four letters like the band's name.

"It was a Fats Domino, bluesy, kind of Rolling Stonesy, early sixties song. I heard it and thought we could do more and came up with the idea to substitute strings for the piano. That changed everything. It was what the song deserved because in structure and lyrics it was so strong already".

— Chris Thomas, on the demo for "Never Tear Us Apart".

Certain songs that were recorded early in production remained close to their demo counterparts, while others were changed drastically. Originally, "Never Tear Us Apart" was a piano ballad having no orchestral structure at all. The song's original arrangement was released on Kick 25, the 25th anniversary reissue. The demo of "Mediate" was also longer. When Andrew first played its demo in the studio, "Need You Tonight" was playing in the background. Upon hearing both tracks being played simultaneously, Nicholas labored to have the two tracks combined. Nicholas said in the band's official autobiography, "I rewound his tape and hit play just as "Need You Tonight" ended and synced up so perfectly that I actually thought something was wrong".

The members of INXS spent the final Kick sessions contributing their talents on Richard Clapton's Glory Road, which was being produced in the same studio.

== Music and lyrics ==
With Kick, Thomas fused the funk and soul of The Swing with the mainstream rock of Listen Like Thieves. In an interview with MusicRadar, Andrew Farriss stated, "The melding of funk and rock was always in our heads. We were very excited about the idea of overlaying two types of songs and genres together."

"I think what makes the Kick album so dynamic is that we weren't so much interested in what everybody else was doing as what we wanted to do. It's really that simple. Michael and I were extremely focused as songwriters, and the band was very intent on making a series of recordings that we could be passionate about".

— Andrew Farriss, on the songwriting for the album.

The success of their single "What You Need" provided primary songwriters Hutchence and Andrew Farriss with the confidence and optimism to pen bigger material, and with the rest of the band's blessing, Kick became the first INXS album written by the duo without input from the other members. When it came time to write and record, the band set out to make an album that did not share any musical formula with other hits of the time. According to Andrew Farriss, "Anyone can write a song that sounds contemporary. We wanted our songs to sound like the future".

Andrew Farriss recalls, "Hutchence's instrument was his voice; he couldn't explain what he was thinking in musical terms. He would say things like, 'It needs to feel like this.' And I'd try to translate that into notes".

Upon its release, Kick was noted for being in sync with the visual media of the late 80's, which is instantly evident in the album's opening track "Guns in the Sky"; the song described the state of the world and its obsession with arms. The rest of the album focuses on themes of fun, love and excess; "New Sensation" and "Calling All Nations" are both about a party lifestyle, while "Never Tear Us Apart" describes an instant connection between two people who form an unending bond. The lyrics to "Devil Inside" are about a life of excess. The sequencing of "Need You Tonight" and "Mediate" provides a lyrical contrast, as the former exudes intimacy while the latter addresses social concerns like apartheid. The band also included a new version of "The Loved One", a song by Australian rock band the Loved Ones they had previously covered in their compilation INXSIVE (1982).

== Release ==
"They hated it, absolutely hated it. They said there was no way they could get this music on rock radio. They said it was suited for black radio, but they didn't want to promote it that way. The president of the label told me that he'd give us $1 million to go back to Australia and make another album".

— Chris Murphy, on his meeting with Atlantic Records. In the band's 2005 official autobiography.

In the band's 2005 official autobiography, the band's manager Chris Murphy stated that upon completion of Kick, he flew to New York to play the finished album for the top executives of Atlantic Records. The US record label first rejected the album, feeling that the funk and dance elements would alienate the band's traditional rock following. Murphy said that he resisted Atlantic's proposition of one million dollars to produce the album all over again. He then devised a strategy to get Kick released.

Unbeknownst to Atlantic, Murphy arranged a secret meeting with the staff of Atlantic's radio promotion division to play them "Need You Tonight". He found a market when the head of college radio promotion agreed to concentrate a strategy on campus radio. The song was a chart success on the radio network and received heavy replay. "Need You Tonight" was released in September 1987. Murphy stated that his strategy had worked. Atlantic added Kick to their release schedule for October.

The album's second single, "Devil Inside", crossed over onto album rock play lists. Over the course of four consecutive top five singles and the support of a short college tour, with INXS playing concerts in college bars and university auditoriums across North America, Kick became popular among American fans.

== Tour ==
Following the release of Kick, INXS embarked on a sixteen-month global tour playing arenas and stadiums in major cities across North America, Europe, Japan and Australia. The band started off their Kick tour on 14 August with a number of secret warm-up shows being played across south-eastern and north-eastern Australia, before setting off on a three leg tour of the US beginning in East Lansing on 16 September. The first American leg ran right through to November, followed by UK dates in December.

With the growing popularity of Kick, and the release of its first single, "Need You Tonight", all twelve songs from the album quickly became staples of the tour's setlists, with "Don't Change" being regularly played during a show's encore.

The tour resumed in March with the band playing three sold-out shows at Radio City Music Hall in New York City from 18 to 20 March. Fleets of trucks were hired to transport the band's equipment, lighting and wardrobe across thousands of miles of road over the next three months. During the band's time spent commuting across America, Andrew began writing and playing new material with a guitar. According to INXS: The Official Inside Story of a Band on the Road, Andrew said, "Prior to the Kick tour I'd never written on the road – mainly because I didn't have time I guess. But with Kick I started writing with a guitar, and I was kind of proud that I'd taught myself to do that". INXS finished up the second leg of the American tour with a handful of shows being played in key cities across the California state, including San Francisco, Fresno and San Diego.

In October, INXS made a brief stopover in Japan to play a small number of shows and festivals in Tokyo and Yokohama, before flying on to Australia to finish the last segment of the Calling All Nations tour. Since the culmination of the tour in November 1988, INXS agreed to a one-year respite. This one-year break allowed the members time off to spend with their families and to work on side projects.

== Critical reception ==
Professional ratings
Review scores
Source	Rating
AllMusic	4.5/5 stars
Chicago Sun-Times	3/4 stars
Christgau's Record Guide	B
Classic Rock	4.5/5 stars
Encyclopedia of Popular Music	4/5 stars
Los Angeles Times	2.5/4 stars
Pitchfork	8.4/10
Q	4/5 stars
(The New)Rolling Stone Album Guide	3.5/5 stars
Sound & Vision	4.5/5 stars

AllMusic's Steve Huey retrospectively described the album as "an impeccably crafted pop tour de force, the band succeeding at everything they try". He added, "More to the point, every song is catchy and memorable, branded with indelible hooks". According to Huey, "Kick crystallized all of the band's influences – stones-y rock & roll, pop, funk, contemporary dance-pop – into a cool, stylish dance/rock hybrid."

Robert Christgau called INXS "silly middlebrow hacks", but acknowledged that Kick delivered "danceable rock and roll that sounds smart in the background". Australian rock music historian, Ian McFarlane, asserted that Kick "became the band's most enduring release by mixing the hard rock sound of Thieves with a looser approach to dance grooves". In a retrospective review, Q wrote, "Hutchence's knowing, Jaggeresque vocal swagger turned 'Devil Inside,' 'Never Tear Us Apart' and the mighty 'Mystify' into something beyond what INXS had done before and what they would do again".

BBC Music's Cormac Heron reviewed the 2004 deluxe edition, "superfluous second disc notwithstanding, this is a near flawless collection of songs" and felt that the "production still sounds fresh and the song-writing partnership of Hutchence/Farriss wins you over with an anthemic glory". In a 2012 special review celebrating the anniversary of albums released in 1987, Classic Album Review admired Kick, calling it a "Well crafted pop/rock/dance album" and stating that it "transformed the band from the status of an alternative niche to that of a mainstream pop headliner". "Robin Smith" of The Record Mirror gave the album a "Perfect" 5 out of 5 rating."

Nick Launay, producer of the band's fourth studio album noted, "They'd lean more toward funk on The Swing and then they'd lean toward rock on Thieves to make it in America. By the time Kick came around, it was time to lean toward funk again. When I heard that album, I thought, wow, they got it right".

The album was nominated for Best Rock Performance by a Duo or Group with Vocal in 1989.

== Commercial performance ==
Kick provided the band with worldwide popularity; it peaked at No. 1 in Australia, No. 3 on the US Billboard 200, No. 9 in the UK and No. 15 in Austria. In the US, the album spent a total of 79 weeks on the Billboard 200, staying 22 consecutive weeks in the top 10. It was an upbeat, confident album that yielded four Top 10 US singles, "New Sensation", "Never Tear Us Apart", "Devil Inside" and the No. 1 "Need You Tonight". In Canada, the album debuted at number 14 on the RPM Albums Chart on 5 December 1987. It reached the top of the charts on 14 May 1988 and remained there for 1 week. The album's biggest single "Need You Tonight" peaked at No. 2 on the UK charts, No. 3 in Australia, and No. 10 in France.

Within a year of its release, Kick had achieved gold and platinum status in many countries. In the United States, the album was certified platinum on 22 December 1987, less than two months after its release, by the Recording Industry Association of America (RIAA), for sales of one million copies. By the end of 1989, it was certified quadruple platinum, having sold in excess of four million units in the United States alone. Kick remains the band's best-selling album in Canada, earning a diamond certification from the Canadian Recording Industry Association (CRIA), for shipments of one million copies. In the UK, Kick was the band's first album to attain a platinum certification by the British Phonographic Industry (BPI), achieving this designation in July 1988.

Kick was a commercial success in other territories across Europe, earning platinum accreditations in France, Spain and Switzerland. At the 1988 MTV Video Music Awards, the band was both the most-nominated and most-awarded artist at the show, winning five of their nine nominations, including the awards for Video of the Year and Viewer's Choice for "Need You Tonight/Mediate". The video for "Mediate", which played after "Need You Tonight", replicated the format of Bob Dylan's video for "Subterranean Homesick Blues", even in its use of apparently deliberate errors. This marked the first of a few instances in VMA history where the same artist and music video won both awards at the same ceremony.

== Legacy ==
Kick is the band's best-selling album, with reported sales approaching 20 million worldwide as of 2012. According to the band's official autobiography, the album sold nearly 10 million units internationally only two years after its release. The Recording Industry Association of America (RIAA) certified Kick as six times Platinum, with shipments of six million units, in 1997. In Canada, Kick is the second album by an Australian act to receive a diamond accreditation, the first being AC/DC's Back in Black. Kick remains the band's best selling album in the UK, having gone three times platinum in 1989, with over 1 million units sold. In the band's native Australia, Kick has gone seven times platinum, marking just over 500,000 in sales. 27 years after its release, Kick re-entered the Australian and New Zealand charts where it peaked again at No.2 in Australia and No.11 in New Zealand.

The album has been lauded by critics the world over as a work of "rhythm rock" perfection, and has made its way onto many "best of" lists; in their 1988 issue of "Best Albums of the Year", Rolling Stone readers allocated Kick at number 3. Two years later, the magazine ranked the album at number 11 in their 1990 Australian issue of "100 Greatest Albums of the 80s".

The album achieved the same ranking on ABC's (Australian Broadcasting Corporation) list of 100 Best Australian Albums, a compendium compiled by Australian journalists John O’Donnell, Toby Creswell and Craig Mathieson. Kick was listed at number 5 in a similar list of "Hottest 100 Australian Albums of all time". Slicing Up Eyeballs ranked Kick at number 6 in their 2013 list of "Top 100 Albums of 1987". VH1 placed the album's biggest single "Need You Tonight" at number 16 on its list of "Top 100 songs of the 80's". LA Weekly also listed the song at number 5 on their list of "20 Sexiest Songs of All Time". In December 2021, the album was listed at number two in Rolling Stone Australia's ‘200 Greatest Albums of All Time’ countdown, and in 2025 fourth single "Never Tear Us Apart" was voted number 1 in the Triple J Hottest 100 of Australian Songs.

== Reissues ==
In 1989, a special edition of Kick was released in Japan through WEA, featuring six additional tracks: the b-sides "Move On" and "Different World", and four remixes of the songs "Devil Inside", "New Sensation", "Need You Tonight" and "Guns in the Sky".

Kick was first re-issued in 2002 by Rhino Entertainment as a remastered version. This expanded release included four previously unreleased bonus tracks: a bonus demo of "Mystify", as well as the demos "Jesus Was a Man" and "The Trap". It also features a guitar version of the b-side "Move On", which is one minute shorter and features a number of removed lyrics. Mercury/Universal reissued the album in 2004 as part of their Deluxe Edition series of albums. This two-disc collection was exclusive to the UK only and featured two b-sides: "I'm Coming (Home)" and "On the Rocks", as well as three live tracks recorded during the band's Kick tour in America.

=== Kick 25 ===
In July 2012, Universal Music Group announced that Kick would be re-issued in various formats to celebrate the album's 25th anniversary. This marked the third time the album has been expanded since its initial release. Although the announcement was not officially confirmed on the band's website, track listings for the album's 25th anniversary began appearing on various UK retail websites via Mercury Records, with release dates set in the fall of 2012. INXS confirmed the news on their website a few days after the announcement by Universal Music Group. It was later reported by the Daily Express that a DVD would be included in the collection, featuring brand new video clips of Hutchence, as well as never before seen handwritten lyrics, sourced directly from the singer's family archives. The band's manager stated, "It'll be an amazing, super-duper package. There's stuff that was recorded with Michael for Kick that didn't go on the album".

Various formats of Kick were simultaneously released on 12 September 2012: a deluxe edition, a super deluxe edition, two digital editions available for download and a limited-edition red-vinyl release. Each format includes the original Kick album remastered, with all of the bonus tracks from the 2002 Rhino expanded release and the 2004 Mercury UK deluxe set. The deluxe edition, a two-disc set, includes b-sides, remixes, demos and live performances on the second disc. The super deluxe edition comes in a ten-inch square slipcase, with an 84-page hard back book inside, a red disc wallet for the four discs (three CD's and 1 DVD), an original tour poster and a Kick sticker sheet. The book features unseen photos, interviews and never before seen lyrics penned by Hutchence. The DVD offers video footage from the band's Calling All Nations world tour, promo videos, and a brand new documentary titled 'Track Baby Track', featuring clips and interviews about the making of the album.

=== Kick 30 ===
In October 2017, Universal Music Group announced that Kick would be re-issued in various formats to celebrate the album's 30th anniversary, which features a 3-CD+Blu-ray, 2-LP vinyl edition (half-speed mastered and pressed at 45 rpm) and digital version.

The album is newly remastered with a Dolby Atmos new surround mix created by Giles Martin. New additions include "Guns in the Sky" (Kookaburra Mix), "Need You Tonight" (Ben Liebrand Mix), "Need You Tonight (Mendelsohn 7″ Edit)" and more. A Blu-ray featuring the music in Dolby Atmos was included on the Blu-ray version.

== Track listings ==
All tracks are written by Andrew Farriss and Michael Hutchence, except where noted.

Side one
No.	Title	Writer(s)	Length
1.	"Guns in the Sky"	Michael Hutchence	2:21
2.	"New Sensation"		3:39
3.	"Devil Inside"		5:14
4.	"Need You Tonight"		3:01
5.	"Mediate"	Andrew Farriss	2:36
6.	"The Loved One"	Ian Clyne; Gerry Humphreys; Rob Lovett	3:37

Side two
No.	Title	Length
7.	"Wild Life"	3:10
8.	"Never Tear Us Apart"	3:05
9.	"Mystify"	3:17
10.	"Kick"	3:14
11.	"Calling All Nations"	3:02
12.	"Tiny Daggers"	3:29
Total length:		39:50

Kick – 1989 Japanese 2-CD Special edition (Disc 2)
No.	Title	Length
1.	"Devil Inside" (re-mix version)	6:31
2.	"New Sensation" (Nick 12″ mix)	6:31
3.	"Move On"	4:48
4.	"Need You Tonight" (Mendelsohn mix)	7:03
5.	"Different World"	4:18
6.	"Guns in the Sky" (Kick Ass mix; Hutchence)	6:02
Total length:		75:03

Kick – 2002 expanded edition bonus tracks (previously unreleased)
No.	Title	Length
13.	"Move On" (guitar version)	3:48
14.	"Jesus Was a Man"	6:10
15.	"Mistify" (Chicago demo)	4:11
16.	"The Trap" (demo)	2:32
Total length:		56:31

Kick – 2004 2-CD deluxe edition – Out-Takes and Demos (Disc 2)
No.	Title	Length
1.	"Move On"	4:47
2.	"I'm Coming (Home)" (Tim Farriss)	4:54
3.	"On the Rocks" (Kirk Pengilly)	3:05
4.	"Mistify" (Chicago demo)	4:11
5.	"Jesus Was a Man" (demo)	6:10
6.	"The Trap" (demo)	2:32
7.	"New Sensation" (Nick 12″ mix)	6:28
8.	"Guns in the Sky" (Kick Ass mix; Hutchence)	6:00
9.	"Need You Tonight" (Mendelsohn extended mix)	7:14
10.	"Mediate" (live from America)	3:46
11.	"Never Tear Us Apart" (live from America)	3:28
12.	"Kick" (live from America)	3:36
Total length:		95:58

Kick 25 – 2-CD edition (Disc 2)
No.	Title	Length
1.	"Never Tear Us Apart" (soul version)	3:35
2.	"Move On" (guitar version)	3:48
3.	"I'm Coming (Home)" (T. Farriss)	4:54
4.	"On the Rocks" (Pengilly)	3:05
5.	"Mistify" (Chicago demo)	4:11
6.	"Jesus Was a Man" (demo/outtakes)	6:10
7.	"The Trap" (demo)	2:32
8.	"Never Tear Us Apart" (live from America)	3:37
9.	"Do Wot You Do"	3:18
10.	"Guns in the Sky" (Kick Ass Mix; Hutchence)	6:00
11.	"New Sensation" (Nick 7″)	3:40
12.	"Different World" (7″)	4:19
13.	"Calling All Nations" (Kids on Bridges remix)	3:11
Total length:		92:10

Kick 30 – 3-CD & Blu-ray edition (Disc 2: Demos, Mixes & More)
No.	Title	Length
1.	"Move On" (guitar version)	3:47
2.	"I'm Coming (Home)" (T. Farriss)	4:53
3.	"Mediate" (live from America)	3:53
4.	"Never Tear Us Apart" (live from America)	3:38
5.	"Kick" (live from America)	3:50
6.	"On the Rocks" (Pengilly)	3:09
7.	"Do Wot You Do"	3:18
8.	"Mistify" (Chicago demo)	4:09
9.	"Jesus Was a Man" (demo)	6:09
10.	"The Trap" (demo)	2:31
11.	"Guns in the Sky" (Kick Ass mix; Hutchence)	6:03
12.	"Need You Tonight" (Mendelsohn extended mix)	7:14
13.	"Move On"	4:47

Kick 30 – 3-CD & Blu-ray edition (Disc 3: Additional Mixes & B-Sides)
No.	Title	Length
1.	"Never Tear Us Apart" (soul version)	3:37
2.	"New Sensation" (Nick 12″ mix)	6:33
3.	"New Sensation" (Nick 7″ mix)	3:42
4.	"Devil Inside" (extended remix)	6:31
5.	"Devil Inside" (7″ version)	5:14
6.	"Devil Inside" (radio edit)	3:55
7.	"Different World" (12″ version)	6:20
8.	"Different World" (7″ version)	4:18
9.	"Need You Tonight" (Big Bump mix)	8:25
10.	"Need You Tonight" (Ben Liebrand mix)	7:17
11.	"Need You Tonight" (Mendelsohn 7″ edit)	4:00
12.	"Guns in the Sky" (Kookaburra mix; Hutchence)	2:23
13.	"Calling All Nations" (Kids on Bridges remix)	3:13
14.	"Shine Like it Does" (live)	3:23
Total length:		2:46:02

== Personnel ==
Personnel taken from Kick CD booklet, except where noted.

INXS

- Michael Hutchence – vocals
- Andrew Farriss – keyboards, guitars, Roland TR-707 drum machine on "Need You Tonight"
- Kirk Pengilly – guitar, saxophone, vocals
- Tim Farriss – guitar
- Garry Gary Beers – bass
- Jon Farriss – drums, percussion

Production

- Chris Thomas – producer
- David Nicholas – engineer
- Paula Jones – assistant engineer
- Pauly Grant – assistant engineer
- Brendon Anthony – assistant engineer
- Bob Clearmountain – mixing at AIR Studios
- Richard Moakes – mix assistant
- Nick Egan – art direction, design, cover concept
- Ken Smith – additional art direction, additional design
- Bob Withers – additional art direction, additional design
- Michael Hutchence – cover concept
- Grant Matthews – photography

== Charts and certifications ==
=== Weekly charts ===
Weekly chart performance for Kick
Chart (1987–1988)	Peak position
Australian Albums (Kent Music Report) (Note: Kick originally peaked at number two on the Kent Music Report chart dated 2 November 1987. While it reached number one on the same chart on 24 October 1988, this is not officially recognised as its peak due to ARIA becoming the official Australian music chart in June 1988, where it re-peaked at number two on 6 November 1988.)	2
Canadian Albums (RPM)	1
French Albums (SNEP)	3
Dutch Albums (Album Top 100)	4
New Zealand Albums (RMNZ)	1
Swedish Albums (Sverigetopplistan)	21
Swiss Albums (Schweizer Hitparade)	25
UK Albums (Official Charts)	9
US Billboard 200	3
German Albums (Offizielle Top 100)	11
Austrian Albums (Ö3 Austria)	15

=== Year-end charts ===
1987 year-end chart performance for Kick
Chart (1987)	Position
Australian Albums (Kent Music Report)	40
Canadian Albums (RPM)	76
New Zealand Albums (RMNZ)	30

1988 year-end chart performance for Kick
Chart (1988)	Position
Australian Albums (ARIA)	1
Canadian Albums (RPM)	1
US Billboard 200	4

1989 year-end chart performance for Kick
Chart (1989)	Position
Australian Albums (ARIA)	91
Canadian Albums (RPM)	52

2014 year-end chart performance for Kick
Chart (2014)	Position
Australian Albums (ARIA)	84

=== Certifications ===
Certifications for Kick
Region	Certification	Certified units/sales
Australia (ARIA)	7× Platinum	490,000^{^}
Canada (Music Canada)	Diamond	1,000,000^{^}
France (SNEP)	Platinum	300,000^{*}
Germany (BVMI)	Gold	250,000^{^}
Hong Kong (IFPI Hong Kong)	Gold	10,000^{*}
Netherlands (NVPI)	Gold	50,000^{^}
New Zealand (RMNZ)	Platinum	15,000^{^}
Spain (Promusicae)	Platinum	100,000^{^}
Switzerland (IFPI Switzerland)	Platinum	50,000^{^}
United Kingdom (BPI)	3× Platinum	900,000^{^}
United States (RIAA)	6× Platinum	6,000,000^{^}
Summaries
Worldwide	—	20,000,000
^{*} Sales figures based on certification alone.^{^} Shipments figures based on certification alone.
