= Shining Star (INXS song) =

1991 single by INXS

Single by INXS

from the album Live Baby Live
- B-side: "I Send a Message" (live); "Bitter Tears" (live) – 3:55; "The Loved One" (live)
- Released: 21 October 1991
- Length: 3:54
- Label: EastWest
- Songwriters: Andrew Farriss; Michael Hutchence
- Producer: Mark Opitz

INXS singles chronology
"The Stairs" (1991)	"Shining Star" (1991)	"Heaven Sent" (1992)

"Shining Star" is a song by Australian rock band INXS, released on 21 October 1991 by East West Records as the only single issued from the band's first live album, Live Baby Live (1991). It was produced by Mark Opitz and was the one new studio track recorded for the album. Upon the song's release, it peaked at No. 21 on the Australian ARIA Singles Chart, No. 27 on the UK Singles Chart, becoming the group's ninth top-40 single in the latter country. In the United States, it peaked at No. 4 on the Billboard Modern Rock Tracks chart, No. 14 on the Billboard Album Rock Tracks chart and No. 84 on the Cash Box Top 100.

== Guest vocalists ==
The studio recording features backing vocals by Keith Urban and Stuart McKie. Urban was yet to release his own first album, and was not yet well known to the public, but was invited to the studio by Kirk Pengilly to join in the recording.

== B-sides ==
Four live tracks were released as B-sides: "I Send a Message" (from Wembley, London 1991), "Faith in Each Other" (from London or Sydney 1990), and "Bitter Tears" (from Paris). The fourth track, "The Loved One" (from Wembley, London 1991), was released in Australia in all formats instead of "Faith in Each Other". All these tracks were only available on the single.

== Track listings ==
- Australian version
1. "Shining Star" – 3:51
2. "I Send a Message" (live) – 4:01
3. "Bitter Tears" (live) – 3:55
4. "The Loved One" (live) – 4:55
- UK version and US 12-inch single
1. "Shining Star" (live EP version) – 3:52
2. "I Send a Message" (live) – 3:26
3. "Faith in Each Other" (live) – 4:40
4. "Bitter Tears" (live) – 3:47
- US and Canadian cassette single
1. "Shining Star"
2. "Faith in Each Other" (live)
3. "Bitter Tears" (live)
- Japanese mini-CD single
1. "Shining Star"
2. "Bitter Tears" (live)

== Charts ==
Weekly chart performance for "Shining Star"
Chart (1991)	Peak position
Australia (ARIA)	21
Belgium (Ultratop 50 Flanders)	37
Canada Top Singles (RPM)	28
Europe (Eurochart Hot 100)	83
Europe (European Hit Radio)	18
Ireland (IRMA)	16
Netherlands (Dutch Top 40)	37
Netherlands (Single Top 100)	40
Switzerland (Schweizer Hitparade)	24
UK Singles (Official Charts)	27
UK Airplay (Music Week)	8
US Alternative Airplay (Billboard)	4
US Mainstream Rock Airplay (Billboard)	14
US Cash Box Top 100	84

== Release history ==
Release dates and formats for "Shining Star"
Region	Date	Format(s)	Label	Ref.
Australia	21 October 1991	12-inch vinyl; CD; cassette	EastWest	
United Kingdom	21 October 1991	7-inch vinyl; 12-inch vinyl; CD; cassette	Mercury	
Japan	10 December 1991	Mini-CD	WEA	
