= Never Tear Us Apart =

1988 single by INXS

Single by INXS

from the album Kick
- B-side: "Different World" (7-inch mix); "Guns in the Sky" (Kick Ass remix)
- Released: 13 June 1988
- Genre: Pop rock; blues rock; soul
- Length: 3:02 (single version); 3:43 (video version)
- Label: WEA
- Songwriters: Andrew Farriss; Michael Hutchence
- Producer: Chris Thomas

INXS singles chronology
| "Devil Inside" (1988) | "Never Tear Us Apart" (1988) | "Mystify" (1989) |

Music video
- "Never Tear Us Apart" on YouTube

"Never Tear Us Apart" is a song by Australian rock band INXS, released in June 1988 as the fourth single from their sixth studio album, Kick (1987). A power ballad, the music was written by keyboardist Andrew Farriss, and the lyrics were written by vocalist Michael Hutchence for his then-girlfriend, Michele Bennett.

In 1988, the single peaked at No. 7 on the Billboard Hot 100 chart, No. 5 on Billboard US Mainstream Rock chart, No. 14 on the ARIA Singles Chart, and No. 24 on the UK Singles Chart. In 1989, the song was nominated for four ARIA Music Awards, winning two; for Best Group and Best Video. In 2014, the single peaked at No. 11 on the ARIA Singles Chart following the success of the miniseries INXS: Never Tear Us Apart. It was ranked at No. 282 on Rolling Stone's 2021 list of "The 500 Greatest Songs of All Time", and in 2025 it was named "The Best Australian Song of All Time" on Triple J's Hottest 100 of Australian Songs.

The song has been recorded and released as a single by other artists such as Tom Jones, Natalie Imbruglia, Paloma Faith, The Teskey Brothers and Sophia Laforteza. In 2010, INXS re-recorded the song with Ben Harper and Mylène Farmer for their twelfth studio album, Original Sin.

== Background and composition ==
"Never Tear Us Apart" is a power ballad, written in the tempo of a modern Viennese waltz, layered with synthesizers and containing dramatic pauses before the instrumental breaks. The music was written by keyboardist Andrew Farriss, who recorded a blues-style demo. Kirk Pengilly lends a saxophone solo near the end. According to the liner notes of Shine Like It Does: The Anthology (1979–1997), the song was composed on piano as a bluesy number in the style of Fats Domino. Producer Chris Thomas suggested a synth-based arrangement instead and replaced the demo's piano part with strings.

Vocalist Michael Hutchence wrote the lyrics for his then-girlfriend, Australian film producer Michele Bennett, who was described as Hutchence's "first real love", his "closest friend and confidante", with whom he was in a relationship from 1982 to 1987 and remained close friends until his death – Bennett was the last person that Hutchence called on the morning of his death, on 22 November 1997. According to Hutchence's sister, Tina, Bennett was the only woman that Hutchence said he had considered marrying. Australian filmmaker Richard Lowenstein, who was close friends with Hutchence, also said that he believed that Bennett was the only woman that Hutchence would marry; "I always felt that, after everything, he'd go back and marry Michele and have a baby with her," he told The Independent in 1998. It was Bennett who introduced Hutchence to Lowenstein, who later directed several music videos for INXS, including the one for "Never Tear Us Apart".

The 2019 documentary Mystify: Michael Hutchence, directed by Lowenstein, features a voice-over interview with Hutchence in which he says of the song:

Interviewer: Who are you singing it to? Who don't you wanna be torn apart from?

Hutchence: Well, it's kinda personal. I don't make up love songs, so... That's definitely a song for a girl called Michele.

Interviewer: Does she know?

Hutchence: Yeah, she knows, but we're not together anymore, so it doesn't work, does it? [laughs].

In a 2019 interview with NME, Lowenstein said of "Never Tear Us Apart" after reading Hutchence's diaries as part of his research for his 2019 documentary Mystify: Michael Hutchence:

He felt guilt over every break-up because it brought back memories of his parents' divorce and their break-up. When he got successful he'd feel the guilt of leaving his brother and it just seemed to be everywhere. Going back into his diaries, we'd find evidence of the guilt – it wasn't just all happy-go-lucky rockstar. There was always problems being presented. His break-up with Michele (Bennett, his childhood flame), he was utterly torn between this woman he loved and how their lives were going in so many different directions. That’s why it inspired ‘Never Tear Us Apart’. Kick had gone to Number One and suddenly there's this kid-in-a-candy store mentality – he was travelling around the world and thought he'd never settle down. There was the hedonistic side to him, but always an almost Catholic sense of self-flagellation too.

On what would have been Hutchence's 50th birthday, on 22 January 2010, Andrew Farriss shared a tribute on the band's official website in which he recalled writing the song with Hutchence:

Whilst INXS was on a world tour in 1986 I sat down on an upright piano and started working on the chords that would eventually become "Never Tear Us Apart". I thought it had potential and asked Michael what he thought of it. He told me he really liked it so I recorded a blues style demo for him. I gave the demo to Michael and the eventual lyric that he wrote was truly inspired. Straight from the heart. I know how much that lyric meant to him... it was a personal love lyric very much in the moment for him. It still amazes me how this song and others we wrote have touched so many people around the world. Michael was a brilliant lyricist and I am very fortunate to have written with him and more importantly, shared his friendship.

== Critical reception ==
A reviewer from Cash Box said that "more impassioned crooning from Hutchence elevates this song" and also praised the "searing sax solo." The Stud Brothers of Melody Maker wrote, "This pleads for passion by jump-starting a cello-like synth that kangaroos unhappily along until it collides with a great fairy of a saxophone which ultimately drags it to a sad demise."

== Music video ==
The music video for the song, featuring an extended intro, was filmed in various locations in Prague along with "Guns in the Sky" and "New Sensation", all directed by Richard Lowenstein. It won the ARIA Award for Best Video at the 1989 ARIA Music Awards.

As of November 2026, the video has a total view count of more than 190 million on YouTube from two versions, making it their most popular song on the platform.

In March 2024, to celebrate the 35th anniversary of "Never Tear Us Apart", INXS shared a video on their official YouTube channel featuring behind-the-scenes footage from the music video, deleted scenes and interviews with Michael Hutchence and Andrew Farriss.

== Impact and legacy ==
After Hutchence's death in 1997, his coffin was carried out of St Andrew's Cathedral by the remaining members of INXS and his younger brother Rhett as "Never Tear Us Apart" was played in the background.

In October 2008, Australian soccer club Newcastle Jets adopted the song as a club anthem. In late 2023, the club introduced a special cover of the song by singer Lyn Bowtell for the women's team.

In 2014, skateboarder Dylan Rieder skated to the song in Cherry, the first full-length skate video from Supreme.

In March 2014, Australian Football League club Port Adelaide also adopted the song as an unofficial anthem leading up to the opening siren at its home ground Adelaide Oval. Fans organically created the tradition and faithfully began raising scarves above their heads as it was sung. By June 2014, the club printed official scarves featuring the words "Never Tear Us Apart" that fans have since held aloft during the song. INXS members Tim Farriss and Jon Farriss attended a match in April 2015, partaking in a rendition of the song.

In January 2018, as part of Triple M's "Ozzest 100", listing the 'most Australian' songs of all time, "Never Tear Us Apart" was ranked number 18.

In 2021, it was listed at No. 282 on Rolling Stone's "Top 500 Greatest Songs of All Time".

The song appears in Euphoria, in season 2, episode 3. During the cold open flashback, Cal dances and embraces his friend Derek to the song. It was also prominently used in the 2024 drama film Babygirl.

In July 2025, the song was named "The Best Australian Song of All Time" by Triple J's listeners poll, Triple J's Hottest 100 of Australian Songs, with the biggest votes for the song coming from the 18—29 age group.

The song is used in the teaser trailer for the Pixar film Toy Story 5, which was released in June 2026.

Both the original and a cover of the song by Filipino-American singer Sophia Laforteza of Katseye were featured in the DreamWorks Animation film, Forgotten Island.

== Chart performance ==
The single reached No. 24 in the UK, and stayed on the charts for seven weeks. In the US, it reached No. 7 on the Billboard Hot 100.

In February 2014, after the Channel 7 screening of INXS: Never Tear Us Apart mini-series, "Never Tear Us Apart" charted again in Australia via download sales. It peaked at No. 11 on the ARIA Singles Chart, surpassing its original peak position of No. 14 back in 1988.

=== Weekly charts ===
| Chart (1988–1989) | Peak position |
|---|---|
| Australia (ARIA) | 14 |
| Belgium (Ultratop 50 Flanders) | 8 |
| Canada Top Singles (RPM) | 2 |
| Canada Retail Singles (RPM) | 9 |
| Europe (Eurochart Hot 100) | 60 |
| France (SNEP) | 48 |
| Ireland (IRMA) | 21 |
| Netherlands (Dutch Top 40) | 7 |
| Netherlands (Single Top 100) | 9 |
| New Zealand (Recorded Music NZ) | 21 |
| UK Singles (Official Charts) | 24 |
| US Billboard Hot 100 | 7 |
| US Adult Contemporary (Billboard) | 42 |
| US Alternative Airplay (Billboard) | 28 |
| US Mainstream Rock Airplay (Billboard) | 5 |
| West Germany (GfK) | 66 |

| Chart (2014) | Peak position |
|---|---|
| Australia (ARIA) | 11 |
| New Zealand (Recorded Music NZ) | 27 |

=== Year-end charts ===
| Chart (1988) | Position |
|---|---|
| Belgium (Ultratop 50 Flanders) | 96 |
| Canada Top Singles (RPM) | 30 |
| Netherlands (Dutch Top 40) | 54 |
| Netherlands (Single Top 100) | 58 |
| Tokyo (Tokio Hot 100) | 98 |
| US Billboard Hot 100 | 95 |

== Certifications ==
| Region | Certification | Certified units/sales |
|---|---|---|
| Australia (ARIA) | 7× Platinum | 490,000^{‡} |
| New Zealand (RMNZ) | 4× Platinum | 120,000^{‡} |
| United Kingdom (BPI) | Platinum | 600,000^{‡} |
^{‡} Sales+streaming figures based on certification alone.

== Release history ==
| Region | Date | Format(s) | Label(s) | Ref. |
|---|---|---|---|---|
| United Kingdom | 13 June 1988 | 7-inch vinyl; 12-inch vinyl; CD | Mercury; Phonogram | |
| Australia | 8 August 1988 | 7-inch vinyl | WEA | |
| Japan | 25 September 1988 | Mini-CD | WEA | |

== Accolades ==
| Year | Award | Category | Recipient(s) | Result | Ref. |
|---|---|---|---|---|---|
| 1989 | ARIA Music Awards | Best Group | INXS – "Never Tear Us Apart" | Won | |
| 1989 | ARIA Music Awards | Best Video | Richard Lowenstein – "Never Tear Us Apart" | Won | |
| 1989 | ARIA Music Awards | Single of the Year | INXS – "Never Tear Us Apart" | Nominated | |
| 1989 | ARIA Music Awards | Artisan Awards – Song of the Year | Andrew Farriss / Michael Hutchence | Nominated | |

== Tom Jones feat. Natalie Imbruglia version ==
"Never Tear Us Apart"

Single by Tom Jones feat. Natalie Imbruglia

from the album Reload
- Released: 27 September 1999
- Genre: Rock
- Length: 3:08
- Label: Gut; V2
- Songwriters: Andrew Farriss; Michael Hutchence
- Producer: Johnny Douglas

Tom Jones singles chronology
| "Burning Down the House" (1999) | "Never Tear Us Apart" (1999) | "Baby, It's Cold Outside" (1999) |

The song was covered by Tom Jones for his 1999 album Reload featuring the Australian singer Natalie Imbruglia. The cover version also includes a music video.

=== Track listing ===
CD single

1. "Never Tear Us Apart" – 3:08
2. "Sunny Afternoon" – 3:26
3. "Looking Out My Window" – 3:19
4. "Sometimes We Cry" – 5:00

== Remix version: "Precious Heart" ==
"Precious Heart"

Single by Tall Paul vs. INXS

from the album INXS²: The Remixes
- Released: 6 August 2001
- Label: Mercury
- Songwriters: Paul Newman; Andrew Farriss; Michael Hutchence
- Producer: Paul Newman

INXS singles chronology
| "Searching" (1997) | "Precious Heart" (2001) | "I'm So Crazy" (2001) |

In August 2001, a remix called "Precious Heart" was released as a single, and credited as Tall Paul vs. INXS.

=== Track listing ===
Australian CD single

1. "Precious Heart" (Radio Edit) – 3:36
2. "Precious Heart" (Original Mix) – 7:40
3. "Precious Heart" (Riva Mix) – 7:40
4. "Precious Heart" (Marc O'Toole Remix) – 8:41
5. "Precious Heart" (Lush Mix) – 8:42

UK CD single

1. "Precious Heart" (Radio Edit) – 3:36
2. "Precious Heart" (Original Mix) – 7:40
3. "Precious Heart" (Lush Mix) – 8:42

=== Charts ===
| Chart (2001) | Peak position |
|---|---|
| Australia (ARIA) | 27 |
| Europe (Eurochart Hot 100) | 57 |
| Ireland (IRMA) | 30 |
| Scottish Singles Sales (Official Charts) | 10 |
| UK Singles (Official Charts) | 14 |
| UK Dance (Official Charts) | 2 |
| US Dance Club Songs (Billboard) | 6 |

== "Never Tear Us Apart" (2010 re-recording with Ben Harper and Mylène Farmer) ==
"Never Tear Us Apart"

Single by INXS featuring Ben Harper

from the album Original Sin
- Released: 12 August 2010
- Genre: Rock
- Length: 4:00
- Label: Petrol Electric
- Songwriters: Andrew Farriss; Michael Hutchence; Mylène Farmer (2010 version)

INXS singles chronology
| "Dream on Black Girl (Original Sin)" (2006) | "Never Tear Us Apart" (2010) | "Mediate" (2011) |

INXS re-recorded "Never Tear Us Apart" with Ben Harper and French singer Mylène Farmer, who wrote new French lyrics, for their twelfth studio album, Original Sin. The song was released on iTunes on 12 August 2010, and also as a promotional single to radio stations on 29 October 2010 prior to the release of the album in November 2010. INXS recorded another version of the song with Mylène Farmer for the soundtrack to the 2019 documentary Mystify: Michael Hutchence, titled Mystify: A Musical Journey with Michael Hutchence, released in July 2019.

== Paloma Faith version ==
"Never Tear Us Apart"

Single by Paloma Faith

from the album Fall to Grace (reissue)
- Released: 23 September 2012
- Recorded: 2012
- Length: 3:05
- Label: RCA
- Songwriters: Andrew Farriss; Michael Hutchence
- Producer: Nellee Hooper

Paloma Faith singles chronology
| "30 Minute Love Affair" (2012) | "Never Tear Us Apart" (2012) | "Just Be" (2012) |

Music video
- "Never Tear Us Apart" on YouTube

"Never Tear Us Apart" was recorded by British singer Paloma Faith for a television advertisement campaign for John Lewis. The advert began airing in the UK from 15 September 2012. Faith later confirmed that the song would be released as her next single on 23 September 2012. She commented "I have always loved this song and I feel honoured to sing it." "Never Tear Us Apart" was released as the first single from the reissued version of Faith's second studio album Fall to Grace and serves as the third single overall. The artwork for the song shows the singer saluting, while wearing a metallic gold dress, with "a honeycomb-like bottom half".

Faith's version of the song can be heard on the opening scene of Law & Order: Special Victims Unit fifteenth-season episode "Beast's Obsession." It is also heard in the Netflix series Umbrella Academy. Faith's version also appeared in the first episode of the Showtime series Yellowjackets.

=== Reception ===
Digital Spy's Lewis Corner gave Faith's version of the song four out of five stars. He stated "It's a brave task to reinterpret a much-loved hit, but Faith's soulful tones immediately thwart any doubts that she can't do the song justice." He added that while it was always going to be tough topping the original, Faith comes "admirably close."

=== Track listing ===
Digital download

1. "Never Tear Us Apart" – 3:05
2. "Never Tear Us Apart" (Orchestral Version) – 3:05

=== Charts ===
"Never Tear Us Apart" (Paloma Faith version) chart performance
| Chart (2012) | Peak position |
|---|---|
| Ireland (IRMA) | 42 |
| Scottish Singles Sales (Official Charts) | 18 |
| UK Singles (Official Charts) | 16 |

=== Certifications ===
"Never Tear Us Apart" (Paloma Faith version) certifications
| Region | Certification | Certified units/sales |
|---|---|---|
| United Kingdom (BPI) | Silver | 200,000^{‡} |
^{‡} Sales+streaming figures based on certification alone.

=== Release history ===
"Never Tear Us Apart" (Paloma Faith version) release history
| Region | Date | Format | Label | Ref. |
|---|---|---|---|---|
| United Kingdom | 23 September 2012 | Digital download | RCA | |

== The Teskey Brothers version ==
In April 2021, The Teskey Brothers released a cover of "Never Tear Us Apart" in dedication to Michael Gudinski. Upon released, Josh said "This is an all-time classic Australian song that all of us love, its a pleasure to sing it and I don't know why we didn't do it earlier. We're very proud to dedicate this release to our friend Michael Gudinski who was a huge supporter of Australian music and The Teskey Brothers. Our two worlds collided and we will always be grateful for that."

== Other notable versions ==
The song was also covered by Katseye's Sophia Laforteza on the soundtrack of the 2026 DreamWorks Animation film Forgotten Island (of which INXS' original is also featured in).
