= Bitter Tears (song) =

1991 single by INXS

Single by INXS

from the album X
- B-side: "Soothe Me"; "Tears Are Bitter"
- Released: 18 February 1991
- Length: 3:49
- Label: WEA
- Songwriters: Andrew Farriss; Michael Hutchence
- Producer: Chris Thomas

INXS singles chronology
"By My Side" (1991)	"Bitter Tears" (1991)	"The Stairs" (1991)

"Bitter Tears" is a song by Australian rock band INXS, released in February 1991 by WEA as the third Australian and fourth UK single from their seventh studio album, X (1990). The song was written by Andrew Farriss and Michael Hutchence as part of the sessions for the X album. It peaked at number 30 on the UK Singles Chart and number 36 in Australia. The single was released to coincide with the band headlining the SummerXS concert at Wembley Stadium in July 1991, as documented in the Live Baby Live DVD.

== B-sides ==
The B-sides are a live version of "Faith In Each Other" from the X album, "The Other Side", written and performed by guitarist & saxophonist Kirk Pengilly and "Soothe Me" written and performed by guitarist & keyboard player Andrew Farriss.

== Track listings ==
- UK 7-inch single
1. "Bitter Tears" (LP version)
2. "Soothe Me"
3. "Bitter Tears" (Lorimer 7-inch edit)
- UK 12-inch single
1. "Bitter Tears" (12-inch Lorimer remix)
2. "Disappear" (Morales remix)
3. "Tears Are Bitter" (instrumental club mix)
- UK 12-inch special edition (Wembley Stadium cover)
1. "Bitter Tears" (Lorimer 12-inch mix)
2. "Disappear" (Morales 12-inch mix)
3. "Soothe Me"
- UK CD single
1. "Bitter Tears"
2. "Soothe Me"
3. "Original Sin"
4. "Listen Like Thieves" (extended remix)
- US maxi-CD single
1. "Bitter Tears" (LP version)
2. "Bitter Tears" (12-inch Lorimer remix)
3. "Bitter Tears" (instrumental)
4. "Disappear" (Morales remix)
5. "The Other Side"

== Charts ==
=== Weekly charts ===
Chart (1991)	Peak position
Australia (ARIA)	36
Canada Top Singles (RPM)	13
Europe (Eurochart Hot 100)	65
Europe (European Hit Radio)	23
Netherlands (Dutch Top 40)	27
Netherlands (Single Top 100)	34
New Zealand (Recorded Music NZ)	44
UK Singles (Official Charts)	30
UK Airplay (Music Week)	9
US Billboard Hot 100	46
US Alternative Airplay (Billboard)	6
US Mainstream Rock (Billboard)	4
US Cash Box Top 100	36

=== Year-end charts ===
Chart (1991)	Position
Canada Top Singles (RPM)	99
US Album Rock Tracks (Billboard)	37

== Release history ==
Region	Date	Format(s)	Label(s)	Ref.
Australia	18 February 1991	7-inch vinyl; 12-inch vinyl; CD; cassette	WEA	
Japan	25 March 1991	Mini-CD	WEA	
United Kingdom	1 July 1991	7-inch vinyl; 12-inch vinyl; CD	Mercury	
