= Loane =

French singer-songwriter (born 1986)

- Born: Loane Rathier; 30 May 1986 (age 39); Paris, France
- Genres: Electropop, French contemporary chanson
- Occupation(s): Singer-songwriter, musician
- Instrument(s): Piano, vocals
- Years active: 2007–present
- Labels: EMI Music France
- Website: loane-lesite.fr

Loane is a French singer-songwriter.

== Biography ==
Loane was born in Paris, France. Living with a musically inclined family, she quickly became quite distinguished at the piano even performing pieces by Satie and Debussy. She refined her skills for a few years at a music conservatory. Aside from her musical pursuits, the young pianist also found interest in theater and literature. She also achieved a degree in Information and Communication. Influenced by the wide spectrum of the musical universe, she delved in projects encompassing electronica, folk, and pop, and composed music for movie advertisements. In 2008, she released her first album for Virgin/EMI, backed by producers Fabrice Dumont (Télépopmusik) and Frédéric Fortuny. After being revealed at Le Printemps de Bourge and Les Francofolies, her song Danser was chosen as "live de l'année" on the programme "Ce Soir (ou Jamais!)" on France 3.

In May 2011, her second album Le Lendemain was released. It was composed on the piano and travels between electronic and pop sounds. The album's combination of synthetic and acoustic sound was achieved between Third Side Records and La Frette Studios under supervision of producers David Sztanke and Yann Arnaud. On the album she shares a duet with Lenny Kravitz and singer Christophe lends his voice to the last song of the album.

== Career ==
In 2008, she was one of the revelations of Printemps de Bourges. She is known to the general public by her song Jamais seule. She has performed on stage throughout France.

- 2005: Writing for the soundtrack of the short film "Manue Bolonaise" directed by Sophie Letourneur
- 2007: Writing for the soundtrack of the short film "Love Collection", Cartier, directed by Olivier Dahan
- 2008: Duet with Polar (Some Velvet Morning, 68 Covers, French Songs)
- 2008: Collaboration with Bardi Johannsson (The World Is Gray, Ghosts From The Past)
- 2009: Writing for the soundtrack of Neuilly sa mère directed by Gabriel Julien-Laferrière
- 2009: Duet with Salvatore Adamo (Amour Perdu, Le Bal des gens bien)
- 2010: Duet with William Fitzsimmons (I don't feel it anymore, Derivatives)
- 2010: French adaption of the INXS title Mystify with John Mayer (Original Sin)
- 2010: Cover of Everytime We Say Goodbye with André Manoukian (So in Love)
- 2011: Duet with Lenny Kravitz (Save us, Le Lendemain)
- 2011: Duet with Christophe (Boby radio edit, Le Lendemain)
- 2013: Writing for the soundtrack of the short film '"Haircut Mouse" directed by Michel Gondry
- 2013: Singing and producing the end credit song of the film Mood Indigo directed by Michel Gondry

== Discography ==
- Jamais seule (2008)
- Le lendemain (2011)
