= By My Side (INXS song) =

1991 single by INXS

Single by INXS

from the album X
- Released: 18 March 1991
- Recorded: 1990
- Length: 3:05
- Label: WEA
- Songwriters: Andrew Farriss; Michael Hutchence; Kirk Pengilly
- Producer: Chris Thomas

INXS singles chronology
"Disappear" (1990)	"By My Side" (1991)	"Bitter Tears" (1991)

"By My Side" is a single by Australian band INXS, the third UK single and fourth Australian single taken from their seventh studio album, X (1990). The song was written by Andrew Farriss, Michael Hutchence and Kirk Pengilly as part of the 1990 sessions for the X album. Record producer Chris Thomas, who produced the album, is also given songwriting credits, specifically contributing to the chorus and arrangement, as explained in the liner notes for the X album special edition in 2002. Farriss has said "By My Side" was written about missing family and friends while touring.

"By My Side" peaked at number 42 on the UK Singles Chart, which was the band's poorest chart performance since first breaking into the UK top 40 with "New Sensation" in 1988. Along with "Never Tear Us Apart", "By My Side" was one of two INXS songs played at the funeral of frontman Michael Hutchence following his death on 22 November 1997. In February 2014, after the Channel 7 screening of INXS: Never Tear Us Apart mini-series, the song charted again in Australia through download sales, peaking at number 67 on the ARIA Singles Chart.

== B-sides ==
The three B-sides are a David Morales remix of their previous hit, "Disappear" and two band solo compositions: "The Other Side", written and performed by guitarist and saxophonist, Kirk Pengilly, and "Soothe Me", written and performed by guitarist and keyboard player, Andrew Farriss.

== Track listings ==
- UK 7-inch and cassette single
1. "By My Side" (LP version)
2. "The Other Side"
- UK 12-inch single
1. "By My Side" (The Movie mix)
2. "The Other Side"
3. "Faith in Each Other" (live)
- UK CD single
1. "By My Side" (LP version)
2. "The Other Side"
3. "Faith in Each Other" (live)
4. "Disappear" (Morales remix)
- Japanese maxi-CD and Australian CD poster pack
1. "By My Side" (The Movie mix)
2. "By My Side" (LP version)
3. "Soothe Me"
4. "Faith in Each Other" (live)
- Australian cassette maxi-single
1. "By My Side" (Movie mix)
2. "By My Side" (LP version)
3. "Soothe Me"
4. "Faith in Each Other" (live)

== Charts ==
=== Weekly charts ===
Chart (1991)	Peak position
Australia (ARIA)	23
Belgium (Ultratop 50 Flanders)	25
Canada Top Singles (RPM)	54
Europe (Eurochart Hot 100)	65
Europe (European Hit Radio)	16
France (SNEP)	48
Germany (GfK)	56
Israel (Reshet Gimel)	1
Netherlands (Dutch Top 40)	27
Netherlands (Single Top 100)	35
UK Singles (Official Charts)	42
UK Airplay (Music Week)	20

=== Year-end charts ===
Chart (1991)	Position
Israel (Reshet Gimel)	18

== Certifications ==
Certifications for "By My Side"
Region	Certification	Certified units/sales
New Zealand (RMNZ)	Gold	15,000^{‡}
^{‡} Sales+streaming figures based on certification alone.

== Release history ==
Region	Date	Format(s)	Label	Ref.
United Kingdom	18 March 1991	7-inch vinyl; 12-inch vinyl; CD; cassette	Mercury	
Australia	13 May 1991	CD; cassette	WEA	
Australia	27 May 1991	12-inch vinyl	WEA	
Japan	25 July 1991	CD	EastWest Japan	
