= New Sensation =

1987 single by INXS

- Standard artwork (Australian 12-inch vinyl single pictured)

Single by INXS

from the album Kick
- B-side: "Guns in the Sky"
- Released: 29 December 1987
- Genre: Funk-pop; dance-rock
- Length: 3:38
- Label: Atlantic
- Songwriters: Andrew Farriss; Michael Hutchence
- Producer: Chris Thomas

INXS singles chronology
"Need You Tonight" (1987)	"New Sensation" (1987)	"Devil Inside" (1988)

Music video
- "New Sensation" on YouTube

"New Sensation" is a song by Australian rock group INXS. It was the third single (second in the UK) released from their sixth studio album, Kick (1987). The music was composed by Andrew Farriss and the lyrics were written by Michael Hutchence. The song features a Kirk Pengilly sax solo and lyrics about a partying lifestyle.

"New Sensation" was released in the United Kingdom on 29 December 1987 and was issued worldwide the following year. It reached No. 3 on the US Billboard Hot 100, No. 9 in Australia, No. 25 in the United Kingdom, and No. 1 in Canada. The first line on the track, "Live, baby, live", was later referenced in the title of the band's 1991 release Live Baby Live. The video for the song was filmed on the roof of Municipal House in Prague and directed by Richard Lowenstein.

== Critical reception ==
Cash Box called "New Sensation" "the pop-iest, hookiest song on the album, perhaps the most radio ready." In January 2018, as part of Triple M's "Ozzest 100", the "most Australian" songs of all time, "New Sensation" was ranked number 44.

== Live performances ==
INXS and J.D. Fortune performed the song at the 2010 AFL Grand Final along with "Suicide Blonde". The song was also the first track to be performed at the London Astoria.

== Track listings ==
7-inch: Atlantic / 7-89080 (US)

1. "New Sensation" – 3:38
2. "Guns in the Sky" (Kookaburra mix) – 2:20
- also available on MC (7 89080-4)

7-inch: Mercury / INXS 9 (UK)

1. "New Sensation" – 3:40
2. "Do Wot You Do" – 3:16

12-inch: Atlantic / 0-86572 (U.S.)

1. "New Sensation" (Nick's 12-inch mix) – 6:28
2. "Guns in the Sky" (Kick Ass mix) – 6:00

12-inch: Mercury / INXS 912 (UK)

1. "New Sensation" – 3:40
2. "Do Wot You Do" – 3:16
3. "Love Is (What I Say)"
4. "Same Direction"

12-inch: WEA Records / 0-258016 (Australia)

1. "New Sensation" (Nick's 12-inch mix) – 6:28
2. "Guns in the Sky" (Kick Ass mix) – 6:00
3. "New Sensation" (Nick's 7-inch mix) – 3:40

== Charts ==
=== Weekly charts ===
Chart (1988)	Peak position
Australia (ARIA)	9
Belgium (Ultratop 50 Flanders)	19
Canada Top Singles (RPM)	1
Canada Dance/Urban (RPM)	13
Europe (Eurochart Hot 100)	79
Ireland (IRMA)	15
Italy Airplay (Music & Media)	17
Netherlands (Dutch Top 40)	18
Netherlands (Single Top 100)	14
New Zealand (Recorded Music NZ)	16
South Africa (Springbok Radio)	15
Spain (AFYVE)	9
UK Singles (Official Charts)	25
US Billboard Hot 100	3
US Dance Club Songs (Billboard)	11
US Dance Singles Sales (Billboard)	33
US Mainstream Rock (Billboard)	8
US Cash Box	3
West Germany (GfK)	35

=== Year-end charts ===
Chart (1988)	Position
Canada Top Singles (RPM)	26
US Billboard Hot 100	65

== Certifications ==
Region	Certification	Certified units/sales
New Zealand (RMNZ)	2× Platinum	60,000^{‡}
United Kingdom (BPI)	Silver	200,000^{‡}
^{‡} Sales+streaming figures based on certification alone.

== Covers ==
Alternative rock band Snow Patrol covered the song for their Late Night Tales compilation. Their rendition was received positively by Hot Press magazine, which wrote that the song had been "well and truly patroled".
