= The Stairs (song) =

Single by INXS

from the album Live Baby Live
- Released: 1 November 1991
- Recorded: 1989–90 (album version); 1991 (live)
- Genre: Alternative rock
- Length: 4:56
- Label: Atlantic
- Songwriters: Michael Hutchence, Andrew Farriss
- Producer: Chris Thomas

INXS singles chronology
"Bitter Tears" (1991)	"The Stairs" (1991)	"Shining Star" (1991)

"The Stairs" is a song by Australian rock band INXS that was released on its 1990 studio album X. A live performance of "The Stairs" from the band's July 13, 1991 concert at Wembley Stadium was released in the Netherlands as a limited-edition single in November 1991. Its release coincided with the release of the Live Baby Live album. The song was written by Andrew Farriss and Michael Hutchence.

Hutchence asserted that "The Stairs" was the most ambitious song he had ever written. Farris spoke about the track in an interview with Spin in 1990, explaining that the song "deals with people in highly urbanized environments not communicating. We should have town squares like they used to have where people go to these little socially instituted environments where it's fashionable. Personally, I don't think fashion and trends are really going to solve the world's problems."

The song was used by CBS-TV over the closing credits at the end of their broadcast coverage of the 1994 Winter Olympics. A re-recorded version of the song was released on the 2010 INXS album Original Sin with J.D. Fortune as lead singer.

The B-sides to the single are the studio version of "The Stairs" from the X album and "The One Thing (Live)" from the Live Baby Live album.

== Track listing ==
- Netherlands CDS

Tracks:

1. "The Stairs" (Live)
2. "The Stairs" (LP Version)
3. "The One Thing"
