= Suicide Blonde =

1990 single by INXS

Single by INXS

from the album X
- B-side: "Everybody Wants U Tonight"
- Released: 22 August 1990
- Genre: Alternative rock
- Length: 3:53
- Label: WEA
- Songwriters: Andrew Farriss; Michael Hutchence
- Producer: Chris Thomas

INXS singles chronology
"Mystify" (1989)	"Suicide Blonde" (1990)	"Disappear" (1990)

Music video
- "Suicide Blonde" on YouTube

"Suicide Blonde" is the lead single from Australian rock band INXS's seventh studio album, X (1990). It was released on 22 August 1990 in the United States and on 3 September 1990 in Australia. The song reached number two in Australia, number nine in the United States, and number 11 in the United Kingdom. In Canada and New Zealand, the single peaked at number one. At the APRA Music Awards of 1991, "Suicide Blonde" won the award Most Performed Australian Work Overseas.

"Suicide Blonde" would be the final song performed live in front of an audience by Hutchence with INXS, on 27 September 1997 in Pittsburgh, Pennsylvania, before his death on 22 November 1997.

== Writing and recording ==
"Suicide Blonde" was written by INXS members Michael Hutchence and Andrew Farriss, after the band had gotten back together after a year-long sabbatical in 1989. The song's title originates from the night Hutchence and then-girlfriend Kylie Minogue attended the debut of the 1989 romantic drama film The Delinquents, which stars Minogue. For the premiere, she wore a blonde wig whose colour she called "suicide blonde".

The recording of "Suicide Blonde" showed some new and older influences on INXS. Jon Farriss's drums show the influence of dance music especially the acid house sounds popular in the UK. Similarly, the blues harp intro on the track, performed by Charlie Musselwhite, was sampled rather than recorded live.

== Critical reception ==
David Giles of Music Week stated that "Suicide Blonde" is "less rocky than their previous work, with an emphatic dancefloor appeal".

== Chart performance ==
In the United States, the track reached a peak of number nine on the Billboard Hot 100, and it topped both the Album Rock Tracks and Modern Rock Tracks charts. A dance remix of the track received wide airplay on US top-forty stations, allowing it to reach the top 10 on the Hot Dance Club Play chart. On the UK Singles Chart the single reached a peak of number 11, while on the Australian Singles Chart it reached number two. In Canada, "Suicide Blonde" reached number one for two weeks according to RPM and for one week according to The Record. It also topped the New Zealand Singles Chart, staying at number one for three weeks.

== Track listings ==
- 7-inch, cassette, and mini-CD single
1. "Suicide Blonde" – 3:55
2. "Everybody Wants U Tonight" – 5:08
- US maxi-CD single
1. "Suicide Blonde" (7-inch mix) – 3:54
2. "Suicide Blonde" (Earth mix) – 5:39
3. "Suicide Blonde" (Devastation mix) – 6:19
4. "Suicide Blonde" (Milk mix) – 5:40
5. "Suicide Blonde" (Demolition mix) – 6:53
6. "Everybody Wants U Tonight" – 5:09
- UK 12-inch single

A1. "Suicide Blonde" (Milk mix)
B1. "Suicide Blonde" (Devastation mix)
B2. "Everybody Wants U Tonight"

- UK CD single
1. "Suicide Blonde" (7-inch version)
2. "Suicide Blonde" (Demolition mix)
3. "Everybody Wants U Tonight"
4. "Suicide Blonde" (7-inch Nik mix)
- Japanese mini-album
1. "Suicide Blonde" (Milk mix)
2. "Suicide Blonde" (Devastation mix)
3. "Suicide Blonde" (Demolition mix)
4. "Suicide Blonde" (Nix mix)
5. "Suicide Blonde" (Earth mix)
6. "Suicide Blonde" (7-inch single mix)
7. "Everybody Wants U Tonight"

== Charts ==
=== Weekly charts ===
Chart (1990)	Peak position
Australia (ARIA)	2
Austria (Ö3 Austria Top 40)	24
Belgium (Ultratop 50 Flanders)	4
Canada Retail Singles (The Record)	1
Canada Top Singles (RPM)	1
Europe (Eurochart Hot 100)	24
Finland (Suomen virallinen lista)	8
France (SNEP)	23
Germany (GfK)	23
Ireland (IRMA)	3
Luxembourg (Radio Luxembourg)	7
Netherlands (Dutch Top 40)	5
Netherlands (Single Top 100)	9
New Zealand (Recorded Music NZ)	1
Spain (AFYVE)	13
Sweden (Sverigetopplistan)	16
Switzerland (Schweizer Hitparade)	11
UK Singles (Official Charts)	11
US Billboard Hot 100	9
US Alternative Airplay (Billboard)	1
US Dance Club Songs (Billboard)	25
US Dance Singles Sales (Billboard)	9
US Mainstream Rock (Billboard)	1
US Cash Box Top 100	5
US CHR Airplay (Radio & Records)	10

=== Year-end charts ===
Chart (1990)	Position
Australia (ARIA)	42
Belgium (Ultratop)	57
Canada Top Singles (RPM)	15
Netherlands (Dutch Top 40)	55
Netherlands (Single Top 100)	75
New Zealand (RIANZ)	14
Sweden (Topplistan)	96
US Album Rock Tracks (Billboard)	27

=== Decade-end charts ===
Chart (1990–1999)	Position
Canada (Nielsen SoundScan)	83

== Certifications ==
Region	Certification	Certified units/sales
Australia (ARIA)	Gold	35,000^{^}
New Zealand (RMNZ)	Gold	15,000^{‡}
United States (RIAA)	Gold	500,000^{^}
^{^} Shipments figures based on certification alone.^{‡} Sales+streaming figures based on certification alone.

== Release history ==
Region	Date	Format(s)	Label	Ref.
United States	22 August 1990	7-inch vinyl; 12-inch vinyl; maxi-CD; cassette; maxi-cassette	Atlantic	
Australia	3 September 1990	7-inch vinyl; 12-inch vinyl; CD; cassette	WEA	
United Kingdom	3 September 1990	7-inch vinyl; 12-inch vinyl; cassette	Mercury	
United Kingdom	10 September 1990	CD	Mercury	
Japan	25 October 1990	Mini-CD	WEA	
Japan	28 November 1990	Maxi-CD	WEA	

== See also ==
- List of number-one singles of 1990 (Canada)
- List of number-one singles from the 1990s (New Zealand)
- List of Billboard Mainstream Rock number-one songs of the 1990s
- List of Billboard number-one alternative singles of the 1990s
