= Tim Farriss =

Australian musician (born 1957)

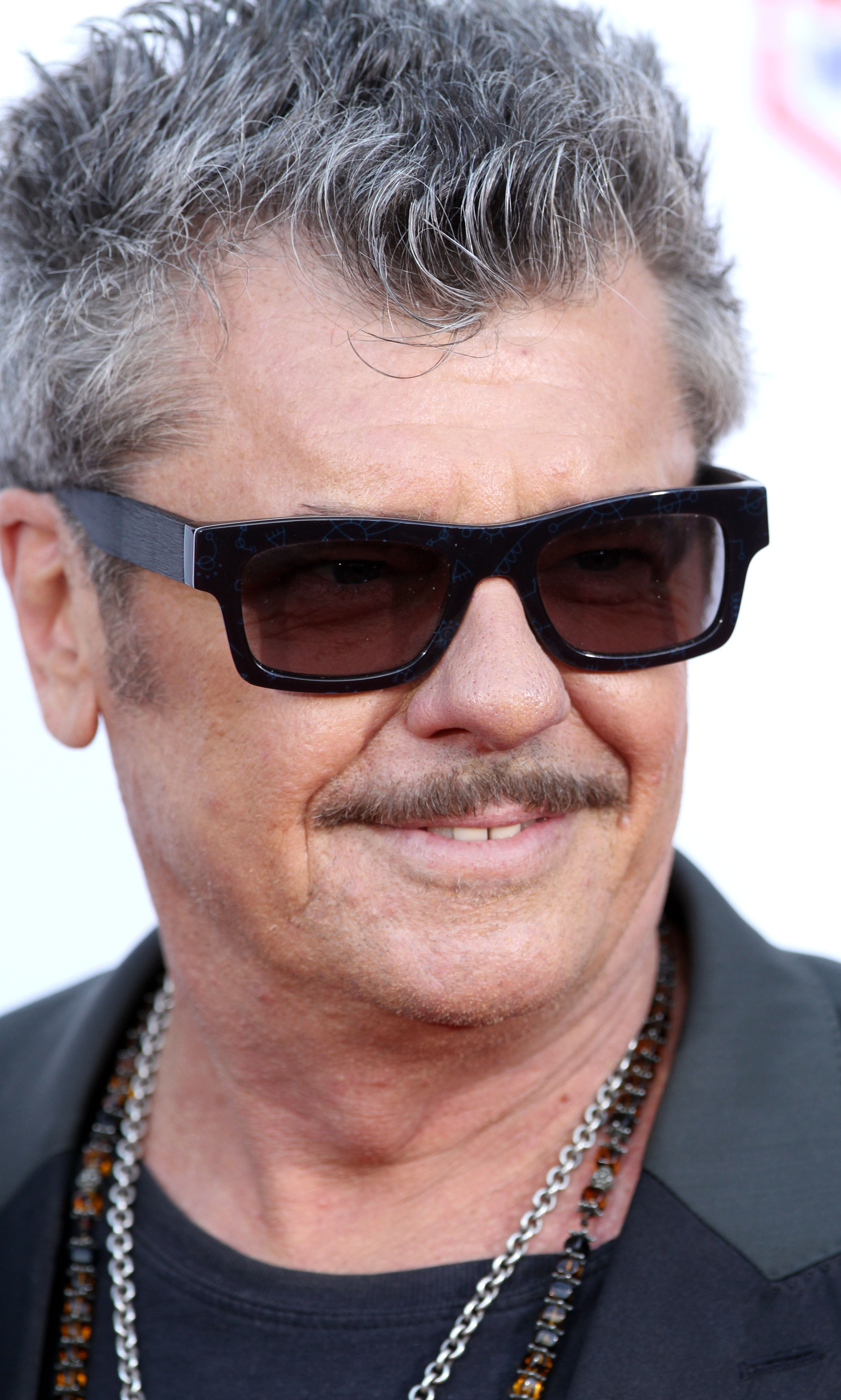
- Farriss in 2014

Background information
- Born: Timothy William Farriss; 16 August 1957 (age 68); Perth, Australia
- Instrument: Guitar
- Years active: 1977–present
- Formerly of: INXS
- Website: inxs.com/band/tim-farriss
- Children: 2
- Relatives: Andrew Farriss; Jon Farriss

Timothy William Farriss (born 16 August 1957) is an Australian musician, founding member and the lead guitarist of the rock band INXS.

== Early life and the formation of INXS ==
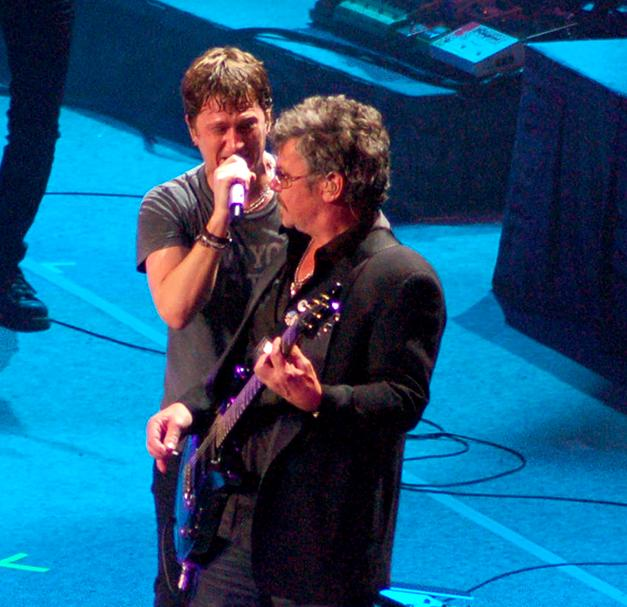
Farriss (right) with Rob Thomas

Farriss was born in Perth, Western Australia, to Dennis and Jill Farriss, and is the oldest of four children: he has two brothers, Andrew and Jon, and a sister, Alison. He was classically trained on the guitar from the ages of eight to twelve by Peter Fredericci, who played with the Australian Symphony Orchestra.

As an adolescent, Farriss attended The Forest High School in Sydney. There, he quickly formed a friendship with Kirk Pengilly. Farriss (lead guitar) and Pengilly (guitar and saxophone) soon formed the band "Guinness," the eventual base and bedrock to the future internationally successful group INXS.

During Farriss's painful recovery from an operation to remove abnormal bone growths in his legs, the result of a Hereditary Multiple Exostoses (which his brother Jon also has), his brother Andrew recruited school friends and "Doctor Dolphin" bandmates Garry Gary Beers (bass guitar) and Michael Hutchence (vocals).

During the Summer XS tour in 1991 INXS played Wembley Stadium in front of 73,791 people, at one point Michael Hutchence told Farriss to "play the fucking riff Timmy", which led to Farriss being nicknamed the Riff Meister, and later the Riff Sheriff. The moment was captured on film and CD for "Live Baby Live".

Farriss plays various G&L (with which INXS hold an endorsement) and Fender guitars, his favourite being a 1956 Stratocaster.

During the 2006 Switch tour, Farriss suffered a knee injury, leading to surgery and the cancellation of several performances; after a short time recuperating he went back on stage wearing a knee support.

== Solo projects ==
Farriss recorded the CD Deep Inside in 1996, which features over 1000 samples of various instruments.

He has also made a fishing video Fish in Space in 1989, the name coming as a humorous reference to bandmate Michael Hutchence's film, Dogs in Space.

Farriss wrote and performed the song "Any Day But Sunday" on the soundtrack for the 1984 film No Small Affair, starring Demi Moore and Jon Cryer.

He also has his own studio, 'Montana', in which he and his sound engineer work with many up and coming Australian artists.

== Personal life ==
On 6 February 1981, Farriss married his high school sweetheart Bethany Anne (Buffy) Reefman and subsequently had two sons. INXS bandmates see Farriss as the "father figure", as he was the first to get married and to have children.

Tim is like the ballast in the band...He's the one who gives the band a bit of leadership, a sense of unity, and he'll usually project a very practical, logical view of everything.

Farriss is a very private man who enjoys deep-sea fishing (tag and release), cricket, swimming, tennis, scuba diving, golf, snowboarding and working on the Kangaroo Valley family farm which he bought from his brother Andrew. He once served as president of the Manly Warringah District Cricket Club.

In January 2015, Farriss severed a finger whilst operating a winch on a boat. He underwent operations to attempt to reattach the finger, followed by physiotherapy. It was uncertain at the time whether he would be able to continue a musical career. Farriss began legal action in 2019 against the owners of the boat for damages, and revealed that he is only able to play a few beginner level chords on the guitar since the accident. He lost his legal case on 28 January 2022 when the Supreme Court of New South Wales handed down its judgment in favour of the defendants. The Court also ordered that Farriss pay the defendants' legal costs.

== Awards ==
=== West Australian Music Industry Awards ===
The West Australian Music Industry Awards (WAMIs) are annual awards presented to the local contemporary music industry, put on annually by the Western Australian Music Industry Association Inc (WAM).

Year	Nominee / work	Award	Result
2008	The Farriss Brothers (Tim (Andrew and Jon)	Hall of Fame	inducted
