= Jon Farriss =

Australian drummer (born 1961)

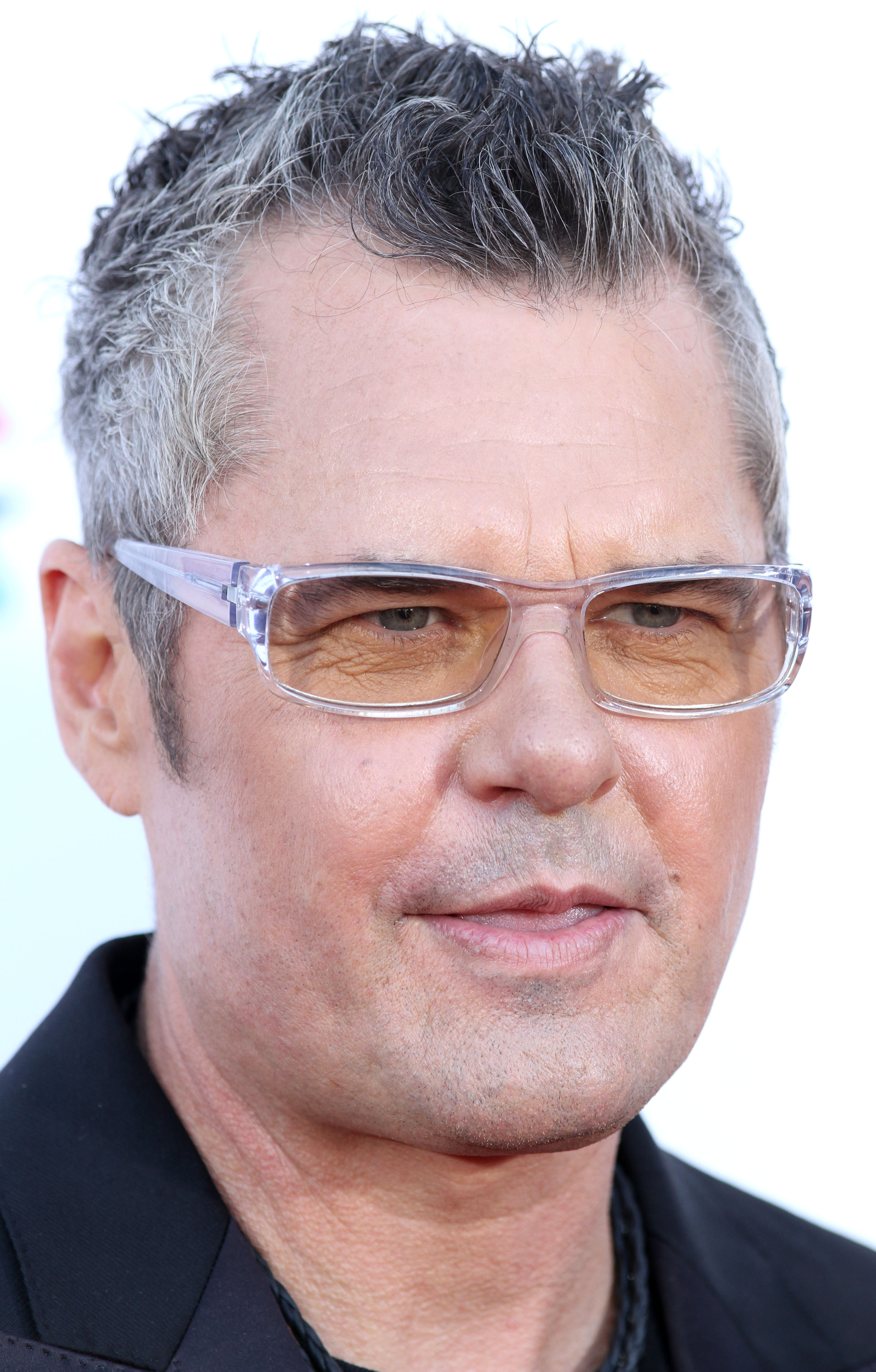

Background information
- Born: Jonathan James Farriss; 10 August 1961 (age 65); Perth, Australia
- Occupations: Musician; record producer
- Instruments: Drums; percussion
- Years active: 1977–present
- Formerly of: INXS
- Website: jonfarriss.com

Jonathan James Farriss (born 10 August 1961) is an Australian drummer and founding member of rock band INXS.

== Biography ==
Jon Farriss was born to Dennis and Jill Farriss, and is the second youngest of four children: brothers and fellow band members Andrew and Tim, and younger sister Alison.

Farriss is known for integrating traditional rock drums with more funk- and dance-influenced beats, as well as acoustic drums, sequencers, and pads. Examples of these techniques can be found in such songs as "Need You Tonight" and "The Stairs".

=== Early years ===
Farriss auditioned to be in the band Guinness with future INXS band-mates Kirk Pengilly and brother Tim, but was rejected for being only nine years old at the time. His first band was playing with a Christian choral group at age eleven years old. He played with bands such as Top Kat, Blackwater, and Fish.

=== INXS ===
Farriss has also been credited with backing vocals on many of INXS's earlier albums. Among his song writing credits with INXS (mostly collaborations with Michael Hutchence) are "Red Red Sun", "The Gift", "Deepest Red", "Faith in Each Other", "Back on Line", "Never Let You Go" (with Fortune) and the hit "Disappear".

He wrote and performed the song "You Never Used to Cry" on the soundtrack for the 1984 film No Small Affair.

Jon appeared on stage with Ringo Starr in February 2013, during Ringo's All Starr Band performance in Sydney. With Ringo singing, Jon played Ringo's drums to The Beatles' song "With a Little Help from My Friends". He was also invited and recognised on stage by Nile Rodgers in Sydney's iconic Opera House, where Nile recalled, "My inspiration to work with INXS was after seeing their drummer Jon Farriss perform live, when the band were playing on a festival with Hall & Oates."

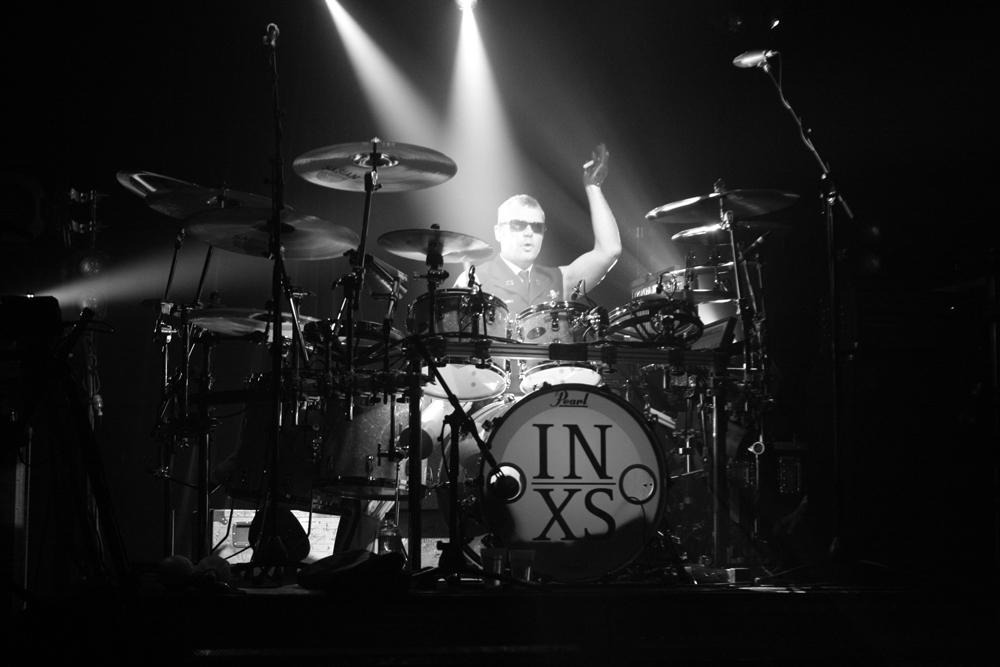
Farriss performing with INXS in 2012

2010 saw Jon as co-executive producer on INXS's tribute album, "Original Sin". He co-produced several tracks on that album featuring artists including Rob Thomas, Ben Harper, Tricky, John Mayer and Pat Monahan. "The Original Sin Project has been a great thing not only for us to have experienced in the studio, but it has also been great taking some of the songs on the road and mixing them in with the normal songs we usually play."

=== Solo career ===
Farriss produced Richard Clapton's Glory Road in 1987 and played on The Great Escape in 1982 as well as performed on drums on three tracks. Farriss co-produced Jimmy Barnes' Love and Fear and performed drums, programming, bass, keyboards, backing vocals.

=== Original Sin ===
Farriss co-executive produced the 2010 tribute album Original Sin which features covers of INXS songs, with each song using a guest singer.

Farriss said, "A lot of artists have covered INXS music, the likes of Tom Jones, Joe Cocker, Snow Patrol, countless others, and we thought, 'Why don't we do that?' Why don't we start doing a remixed, re-imagined cover album but with our own songs", he said. "And that's how it started."

Contributors included Rob Thomas, Ben Harper, Train's Pat Monahan, Nikka Costa and numerous others.

Farriss co-executive produced the album with Chris Murphy. Farriss stated, "There's a pretty stringent gallery of ears that has to pass through the band, including myself. I'm extremely critical of everything. But throughout the project, the more and more it became clear that part of my task as executive producer, along with Chris Murphy, was to sort of integrate producers and, when necessary, co-produce songs. At the end of the day, you can't do everything by yourself. It's a team effort.

=== Smokin Joe (feat Viv Richards) ===
Smokin Joe (feat Viv Richards) was released in March 2015 on Farriss' independent label Drum Opera. Farriss teamed up with one of cricket's greatest players of all time Viv Richards on the soul infused track which features the spoken word of Richards. Farriss executive produced and co-wrote the track with Walter Brandt, Farriss also performed on drums, percussion and programming.

On meeting Viv Richards Farriss recalls "Viv was such a charismatic and affable guy. We hit it off straight away and it wasn't hard to recognise his love of music. Given these parallels, and my desire to hear him on a track, I approached him to see if he was interested in doing something musically, and thankfully he said yes".

"I was very excited yet slightly nervous to work with Viv. I knew this was an uncharted area. But the goal was to have fun – I had no pressure on myself or expectations of it being a chart success or fit into any specific genre or live anywhere in particular, other than in people's hearts" says Farriss of their first meeting in the studio.

== Personal life ==
He was married to actress Leslie Bega from 14 February 1992 to 1999.

In 2006, he married his long-time girlfriend Kerry Norris in a small beach-side ceremony. The couple's first child was born in 2008. Their son was born in 2010.

== Awards ==
=== West Australian Music Industry Awards ===
The West Australian Music Industry Awards (WAMIs) are annual awards presented to the local contemporary music industry, put on annually by the Western Australian Music Industry Association Inc (WAM).

Year	Nominee / work	Award	Result
2008	The Farriss Brothers (Jon (Andrew and Tim)	Hall of Fame	inducted
