= Kirk Pengilly =

Australian rock musician, saxophonist and guitarist (born 1958)

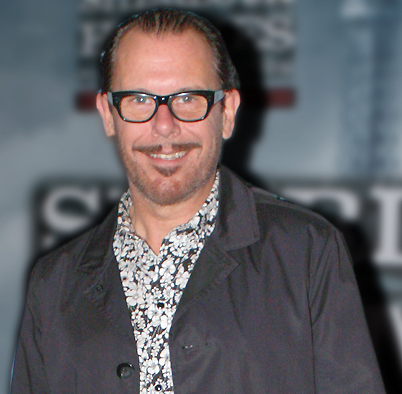
- Pengilly in 2011

Background information
- Also known as: Snore
- Born: 4 July 1958 (age 68); Kew, Victoria, Australia
- Genres: Rock; new wave
- Occupation: Musician
- Instruments: Guitar; saxophone; vocals
- Years active: 1975–present
- Formerly of: INXS
- Website: from the INXS website

Kirk Pengilly (/pɛnˈɡɪliː/ pehn-GIL-ee; born 4 July 1958) is an Australian musician and member of the Australian rock group INXS. Pengilly plays saxophone and guitar, and also performs as a backing vocalist.

== Early career ==
Pengilly moved to Sydney in 1966, and became best friends with fellow band member Tim Farriss with whom he attended Forest High School. Their first band Guinness, formed in 1971, was a high school band in which Pengilly was the principal songwriter and lead singer. The band included American David Stewart on pedal-steel guitar and Malcolm Walker on drums, and was named after bass player Steve Spencer's dog. Guinness played a style of music inspired by progressive rock bands like Yes, Pink Floyd, Emerson Lake and Palmer and Gentle Giant, as well as Bruce Springsteen and Jimmy Buffett.

Mixing country rock and the concert style of rock music worked well for a while, and the band enjoyed some success on Sydney's Northern Beaches and Sydney city venues like Chequers, Frenchs and others. However, the music was not commercially successful and the band struggled to gain a steady following. In late 1976, the group disbanded when David Stewart returned to America. Malcolm played in the club scene with a number of bands, while Steven embarked upon a career as a sound technician in the UK.

== INXS ==
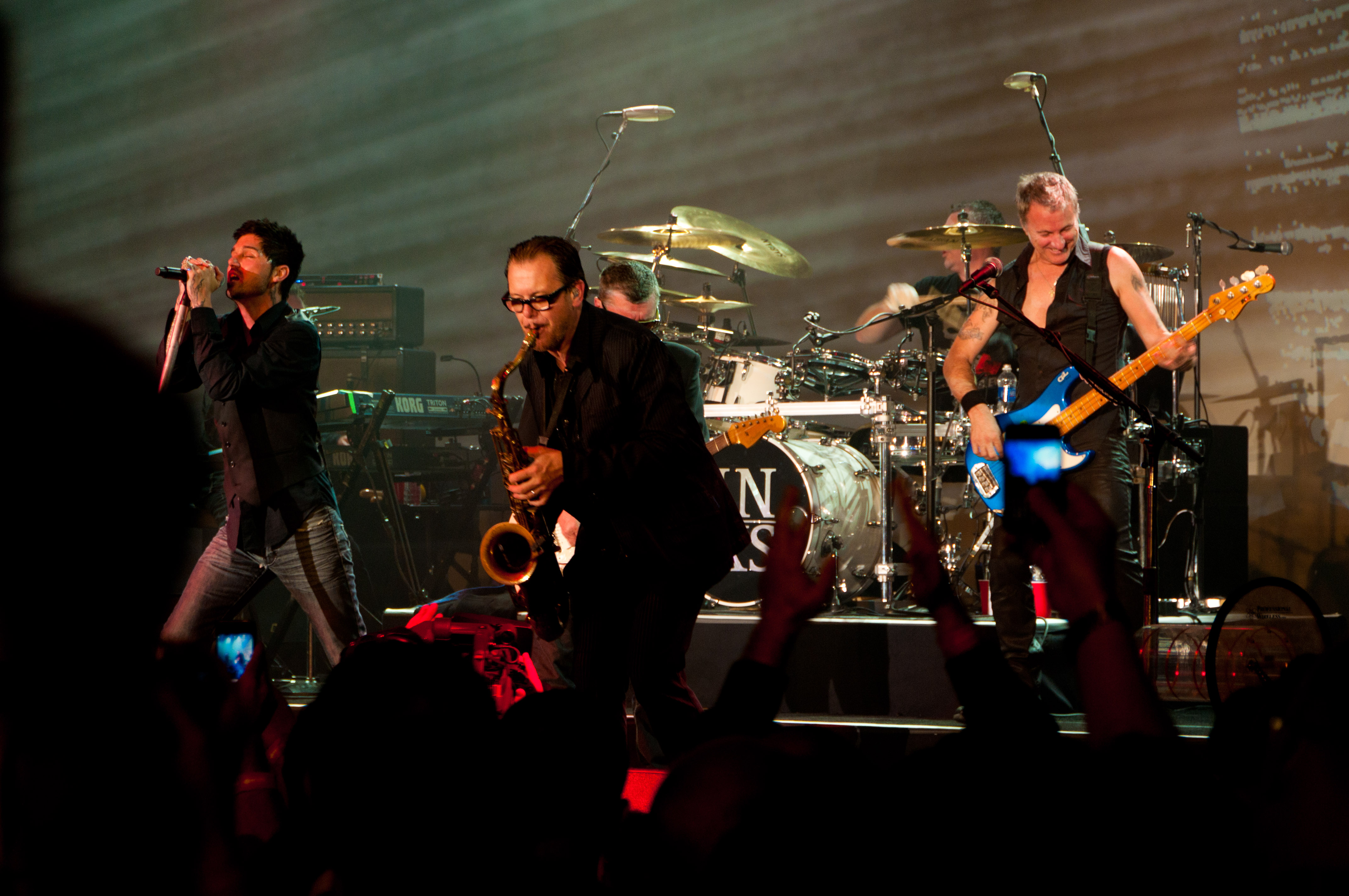
Pengilly performing with INXS in 2010

The Farriss Brothers band was formed in 1977, subsequently changing the band name to INXS in 1979. In the band, Pengilly played guitar and saxophone and provided backing vocals. He co-wrote several songs, including "Don't Change", "By My Side", "Listen Like Thieves", and "Just Keep Walking". Pengilly was also the creator of a rare "Merry Christmas" record sent to early 1980s fanclub members in Australia and the United States.

Pengilly was also the band's spokesperson and archivist, logging daily entries in diaries that date back to the beginning of INXS.

INXS toured the world, with highlights including playing to 250,000 people at the US Festival in California in 1983, performing for Prince Charles and Princess Diana in Melbourne in 1985, playing with Queen at Wembley Stadium in 1986, headlining the Rock in Rio festival where they played to over 150,000 people in 1991, headlining their own concert to 75,000 people at Wembley Stadium, also in 1991, and headlining the HFStival in 1993. The band received three Grammy nominations and were inducted into the Australian ARIA Hall of Fame.

Pengilly stated that Michael Hutchence's death in 1997 came as a major shock because Hutchence was in "a great place" and believes it was an accident. After Hutchence's death, INXS continued playing with various singers before disbanding in 2012.

== Other projects ==
In 1982 Pengilly became involved in a one-off EP project with the band the Igniters. The following year, he, Andrew Farriss and Garry Gary Beers worked together on the 12" release of "Flaming Hands" / "Cast My Love". In 1987, Pengilly appeared in the music video "You're Gonna Get Hurt", released by New Zealand singer Jenny Morris, unrecognizable without his trademark glasses.

When the band was on a break during 1989, Pengilly along with Tim Farriss produced an album for local Sydney band Crash Politics. He played saxophone for Richard Clapton on his Distant Thunder album in 1993, and has also been a session guitarist for Shona Laing and saxophonist for Martin Plaza. His production efforts include an album for his brother Drew's band, Coo, in 1999, and in 2002 Pengilly co-wrote and co-produced the album "Still in Bed" by Hughie Murray.

Pengilly starred in the first series of Celebrity MasterChef Australia and progressed to the finals, where he came second to Olympic swimmer Eamon Sullivan. In December 2016, he and his wife Layne became brand ambassadors for the online health and wellness market-place Inner Origin.

== Personal life ==
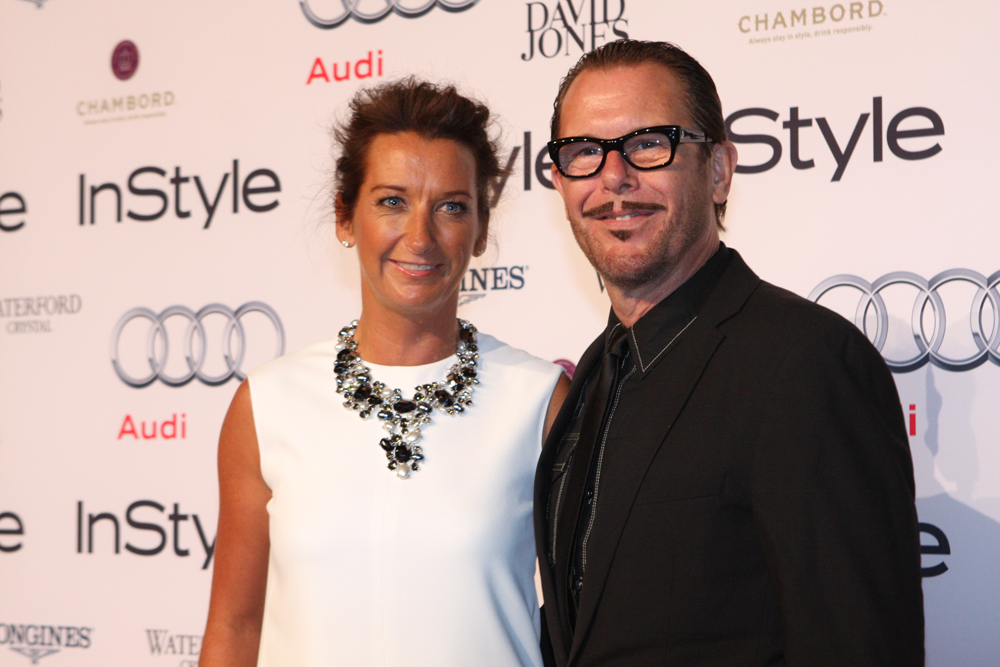
Pengilly and wife Layne Beachley in 2012

Pengilly dated designer Karen Hutchinson for about ten years, and she occasionally traveled with INXS during tours. They have a daughter, actress April Rose Pengilly (b. 1988).

In December 1993, Pengilly married singer Deni Hines. The marriage lasted ten months, and the two parted ways in early 1995.

Pengilly started dating professional surfer Layne Beachley in about 2003. Their relationship started after they were introduced by singer Jon Stevens, a mutual friend. After a seven-year courtship, they were married in a private ceremony on 10 October 2010 at their South Coast home in New South Wales. They renewed their wedding vows in 2014 after Layne had lost her wedding ring whilst surfing. In 2020, they celebrated their 10-year wedding anniversary with a trip to the Blue Mountains, and also stated how the pandemic lockdown helped to bring them closer together. As of 2020, Pengilly and Beachley lived on the northern beaches of Sydney.

Pengilly is an ambassador of the charitable group Glaucoma Australia, after experiencing glaucoma in 1987 at the age of 29.

In 2015, Pengilly underwent surgery for aggressive prostate cancer after indications of the condition started in 2014. After the surgery, he was approached by Movember to become their Key Ambassador, and has worked with the group on several endeavours. Pengilly plays Stratocasters as well as SG1820 Yamaha guitars after being influenced by hearing Carlos Santana playing one.
