= Andrew Farriss =

Australian musician (born 1959)

Andrew Farriss AM
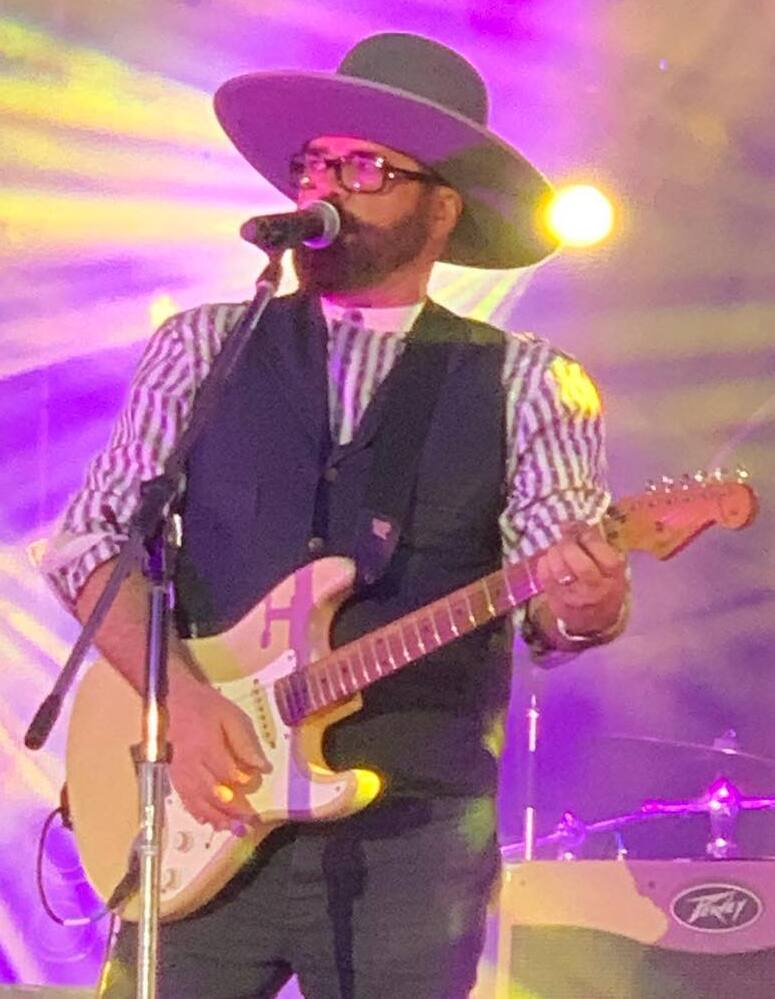
- Farriss performing at the Gympie Muster in 2019

Background information
- Born: Andrew Charles Farriss; 27 March 1959 (age 67); Perth, Western Australia
- Genres: Rock; new wave; country
- Occupation: Musician
- Instruments: Keyboards; guitar; harmonica; percussion; vocals
- Years active: 1977–present
- Formerly of: INXS

Andrew Charles Farriss AM (born 27 March 1959) is an Australian rock musician and multi-instrumentalist best known as the keyboardist, backing vocalist, and main composer for rock band INXS. He released his debut solo album in 2021.

== Career ==
Andrew Charles Farriss was born on 27 March 1959 in Perth, Western Australia, to Dennis and Jill Farriss, and is the second-oldest of four children: he has two brothers, Tim (born 1957) and Jon (born 1961), and a sister, Alison. At the age of five years, Farriss, and his family had a holiday in London where they saw a performance by the Beatles. In 1971 the Farriss family relocated to Sydney, where he attended Davidson High School. With Tim taking up guitar lessons, Farriss "had instinctively taken to playing piano", and Jon played drums. At school, Farriss met Michael Hutchence after preventing a fight with another student. The two became friends, and in 1976 Hutchence, on lead vocals, joined his band, Doctor Dolphin. The line-up included two other classmates, Kent Kerny and Neil Sanders and, from the nearby Forest High School a bass guitarist, Garry Beers, and Geoff Kennely.

Farriss is credited solely with keyboards on the band's earliest albums, but by 1984's The Swing, he was listed as playing guitar as well. On stage, he also plays harmonica and various hand-held percussion instruments.

While INXS's early albums credit the band as songwriters, by their third album, Shabooh Shoobah, the team of Farriss as composer and Hutchence as lyricist was well established for most of the band's material. While there were some INXS songs written by other members of the group, or by Farriss alone, it was this Farriss–Hutchence duo that brought INXS the majority of their international success in the 1980s and 1990s. In fact, Farriss co-wrote all but one of the band's top-40 hits in the US.

Despite extensive writing, recording and touring commitments with INXS, Farriss collaborated with many other Australian artists in a songwriting or production capacity. His most significant early collaboration was with Jenny Morris, a New Zealand singer who had sung back-up vocals on INXS' 1985 hit album, Listen Like Thieves. Farriss has also co-written and produced with the Australian Aboriginal band Yothu Yindi, Australian country singer Tania Kernaghan and Scottish rockers Gun. At the ARIA Music Awards of 1990 he won Producer of the Year for his work on the Jenny Morris album Shiver.

In 2005, INXS launched a reality TV show, Rock Star: INXS, a worldwide search for a new lead singer. While all of INXS knew it would be impossible to replace Michael Hutchence, who died in 1997, they wished to carry on bringing their music to the world.

In 2016, Farriss was inducted into the Australian Songwriters Hall of Fame.

In 2019, Farriss released his debut solo single "Come Midnight". In January 2020 he released his second single "Good Momma Bad". He has performed solo at the Hay Mate drought relief concert, the Gympie Muster, the Tamworth Country Music Festival, and the Bluebird Cafe in Nashville. On 28 August 2020, Farriss released his single "All the Stars Are Mine" and announced his EP Love Makes the World, which was released on 2 October 2020.

On 26 January 2020, Farriss was awarded with the Member of the Order of Australia.

Farriss released his debut, self-titled album in March 2021.

In June 2024, Farris released "Something Stronger" and announced the release of The Prospector, his second solo album, scheduled for release in July 2026.

== Personal life ==
Farriss married Shelley Blanks on 22 April 1989. The couple have three children.

In the official INXS autobiography Story to Story, Farriss describes his dislike of touring and being away from his family.

Farriss married Marlina Neeley in October 2013. The couple live on a cattle farm in the Tamworth Region of New South Wales.

== Discography ==
=== Albums ===
Title	Details	Peak chart positions
Title	Details	AUS country
Andrew Farriss	Released: 19 March 2021; Label: Rockingham Holdings, BMG Australia	9
The Prospector	Released: 11 July 2026; Label: Rockingham Holdings	–

=== Extended plays ===
Title	Details
Love Makes the World	Released: 2 October 2020; Label: Rockingham Holdings, BMG Australia

=== Singles ===
Title	Year	Album
"Come Midnight"	2019	Andrew Farriss
"Good Momma Bad"	2020	Andrew Farriss
"All the Stars are Mine"	2020	Love Makes the World
"Love Makes the World"	2020	Love Makes the World
"Run Baby Run"	2021	Andrew Farriss
"Apache Pass"	2021	Andrew Farriss
"You Are My Rock "	2022	Andrew Farriss
"Someone for Everyone"	2023	The Prospector
"Something Stronger"	2024	The Prospector
"Gold Rush to Ghost Town"	2024	The Prospector
"Southern Cross Shines"	2024	The Prospector
"Mending Fences"	2026	The Prospector
"Rolling Home"	2026	The Prospector

== Awards and nominations ==
=== APRA Awards ===
The APRA Awards are presented annually from 1982 by the Australasian Performing Right Association (APRA), "honouring composers and songwriters". They commenced in 1982.

Year	Nominee / work	Award	Result	Ref.
2021	"Break My Heart" by Dua Lipa (Andrew Farriss, Michael Hutchence, Dua Lipa, Jordan Johnson, Stefan Johnson, Ali Tamposi, Andrew Watt)	Song of the Year	Shortlisted	
2021	"Break My Heart" by Dua Lipa (Andrew Farriss, Michael Hutchence, Dua Lipa, Jordan Johnson, Stefan Johnson, Ali Tamposi, Andrew Watt)	Most Performed Pop Work	Nominated	
2021	"Break My Heart" by Dua Lipa (Andrew Farriss, Michael Hutchence, Dua Lipa, Jordan Johnson, Stefan Johnson, Ali Tamposi, Andrew Watt)	Most Performed Australian Work	Nominated	

=== ARIA Music Awards ===
The ARIA Music Awards is an annual awards ceremony that recognises excellence, innovation, and achievement across all genres of Australian music.

Year	Nominee / work	Award	Result
1990	Andrew Farriss for Shiver by Jenny Morris	Producer of the Year	Won

=== Australian Songwriters Hall of Fame ===
The Australian Songwriters Hall of Fame was established in 2004 to honour the lifetime achievements of some of Australia's greatest songwriters.

Year	Nominee / work	Award	Result
2016	Himself (with Michael Hutchence)	Australian Songwriters Hall of Fame	inducted

=== Countdown Australian Music Awards ===
Countdown was an Australian pop music TV series on national broadcaster ABC-TV from 1974 to 1987, it presented music awards from 1979 to 1987, initially in conjunction with magazine TV Week. The TV Week / Countdown Awards were a combination of popular-voted and peer-voted awards.

Year	Nominee / work	Award	Result
1984	Himself (with Michael Hutchence)	Best Songwriter	Won

=== West Australian Music Industry Awards ===
The West Australian Music Industry Awards (WAMIs) are annual awards presented to the local contemporary music industry, put on annually by the Western Australian Music Industry Association Inc (WAM).

Year	Nominee / work	Award	Result
2008	The Farriss Brothers (Andrew, Tim and Jon)	Hall of Fame	inducted
