= Dekadance =

EP by INXS

EP by INXS
- Released: September 1983
- Recorded: 1982, 1983
- Genre: Rock, dance
- Length: 21:11
- Label: ATCO, US – 90115-1
- Producer: Mark Opitz

INXS chronology
Shabooh Shoobah (1982)	Dekadance (1983)	The Swing (1984)

Dekadance

EP by INXS
- Released: April 1984
- Recorded: 1983
- Genre: Rock, dance
- Label: WEA, Australia – XS-4
- Producer: Nick Launay, Nile Rodgers

Dekadance is the title of two different collections of remixes by Australian rock band INXS: a 1983 four-track 12" and cassette EP released in the United States of songs from Shabooh Shoobah; and a 1985 seven-track cassette released in Australia of songs from The Swing. The latter included a cover version of "Jackson" as a duet by INXS' Michael Hutchence with Jenny Morris, their backing singer. This compilation peaked at No. 2 on the Australian Kent Music Report Albums Chart in April 1985.

The Australian cassette version of Dekadance features remixes from The Swing, and was released in six different versions. Each had a different sleeve, one for each member of the band, which were sourced from the band photo on the cover of The Swing. In following the general theme of the release, the photos themselves were "remixed" by the use of halftone (or similar) printing. Each image wraps completely around the package and is difficult to identify unless the package is dismantled and opened flat. Instead of the usual plastic hinged case, the packaging was a cardboard box that featured a flip-top opening, similar to that of a cigarette packet.

== Track listings ==
=== 12": ATCO 90115-1 (US) ===
All tracks are written by Andrew Farriss, mostly with Michael Hutchence.

Side one
No.	Title	Length
1.	"Black and White" (extended version)	4:54
2.	"To Look at You" (extended version)	6:26

Side two
No.	Title	Length
3.	"The One Thing" (extended version)	6:06
4.	"Here Comes II" (new version)	3:27
Total length:		21:11

=== Cassette: WEA XS 4 (Australia) ===
Side one
No.	Title	Length
1.	"Original Sin" (Produced and mixed by Nile Rodgers)	6:20
2.	"I Send a Message" (Produced and mixed by Nick Launay)	5:01
3.	"Burn for You" (Produced and mixed by Nick Launay)	6:05
4.	"Dancing on the Jetty" (Remix by Andrew Farriss)	4:08

Side two
No.	Title	Length
5.	"Melting in the Sun" (Produced and mixed by Nick Launay)	4:44
6.	"Love Is (What I Say)" (Remix by Mark Opitz)	3:41
7.	"Jackson" (featuring Jenny Morris)	3:19
Total length:		33:18

== Charts ==
=== Weekly charts ===
Chart (1985)	Peak position
Australia (Kent Music Report)	2

=== Year-end charts ===
Chart (1985)	Peak position
Australia (Kent Music Report)	18
