= Troy Davies =

- Birth name: Peter Campbell Davies
- Also known as: Ecco Homo, Vanessa
- Born: 8 May 1959
- Died: 12 April 2007 (aged 47); Sydney, Australia
- Occupation(s): Artist, singer, musician
- Instrument: Vocals

Peter Campbell "Troy" Davies (1959–2007), sometimes known as Ecco Homo or Vanessa, was an Australian artist, singer, and musician.

== Career ==
Under the stage name Ecco Homo, he signed a record deal with RooArt. He released two singles, "Motorcycle Baby" and "New York, New York". The video clip of the former featured Michael Hutchence, and the latter featured Bono and The Edge. Producers and musicians who worked on the singles include Ollie Olsen, Gus Till, Michael Sheridan, Bill McDonald (all from Max Q) and Big Pig's Sherine Abeyratne.

In 2015 the film Ecco Homo, directed by Richard Lowenstein and Lynn-Maree Milburn, was released. It documented Davies' life and career. The film features interviews with people who knew him including Bono, Hutchence and Kriv Stenders.

== Discography ==
- "Motorcycle Baby" (1988) - RooArt Aus #66
- "New York, New York" (1990) - RooArt
