= Strikebound =

- Directed by: Richard Lowenstein
- Written by: Richard Lowenstein
- Based on: Oral history interviews published by Wendy Lowenstein
- Produced by: Miranda Bain; Timothy White
- Starring: Chris Haywood; Carol Burns
- Cinematography: Andrew de Groot
- Edited by: Jill Bilcock
- Music by: Declan Affley
- Distributed by: Ronin Films
- Release date: 20 September 1984
- Running time: 101 minutes
- Country: Australia
- Language: English
- Budget: A$750,000
- Box office: A$157,000 (Australia)

Strikebound is a 1984 Australian film directed by Richard Lowenstein. It is based on the experiences of real people during the 1937 coal-miners' strike in Victoria, Australia, the Korumburra miners' strike.

== Synopsis ==
Strikebound is the dramatised story of a coal-miners' strike in 1937, in the small south Gippsland town of Korumburra. The story is told through the struggles of Agnes and Wattie Doig, two Scottish immigrants, who were real people.

== Cast ==
- Chris Haywood as Wattie Doig
- Carol Burns as Agnes Doig
- Hugh Keays-Byrne as Idris Williams
- Rob Steele as Charlie Nelson
- Nik Forster as Harry Bell
- David Kendall as Birch
- Anthony Hawkins as Police Sergeant
- Marion Edward as Meg
- Tiriel Mora as Militant Miner

== Production ==
Richard Lowenstein had made a short film, Evictions, about unemployed Australian people during the Depression, but felt slightly unsatisfied by the experience and wanted to have another attempt at the subject matter. During the making of the short film he had met Wattie and Agnes Doig and heard stories about unionism in coal mining in Victoria. He spent the next two years researching the story, 15 months of it while on the dole.

Lowenstein's mother, historian Wendy Lowenstein, published Weevils in the Flour in 1978, an oral history about the Depression, including many interviews. Lowenstein used the interviews from Weevils in the Flour when writing his script in 1980-81, and his mother started writing another work based on this, called Dead Men Don't Dig Coal, which was never completed. However, the title of the unpublished manuscript was used in the film credits.

The film was originally envisioned as a 50-minute dramatised documentary called The Sunbeam Shaft but evolved into a feature film. The film was partly shot at a real disused mine in Wonthaggi, and Maldon, in Central Victoria.

The film was co-produced by Victorian filmmaker Miranda Bain (Note: Who now works as a strategic advisor in justice and the courts, and was nominated for an Australian of the Year Award in 2018.) and New Zealand producer Timothy White. Cinematography was by Andrew de Groot, and the film was edited by Jill Bilcock.

It was made on a budget of A$750,000.

== Release ==
The film premiered at the 1984 Cannes Film Festival in May 1984, (Note: Where Lowenstein first met Michael Hutchence, leading to friendship and collaborations on later films.) where it played to sold-out audiences, garnered a full-page re view in Le Matin newspaper, and received many invitations to other film festivals.

It screened at the Karlovy Vary International Film Festival in Czechoslovakia, followed by Venice Film Festival, where it was given an ovation at 's Critics Week, which is unusual. It went on to screen at the Edinburgh, London, New York, and Pia Film Festivals.

It was released in Australian cinemas in September 1984.

In 1985 it screened at Sundance and Seattle Film Festivals, and continued to be screened at other events and festivals in the 1990s.

== Box office ==
Strikebound grossed $157,000 at the box office in Australia.

== Accolades ==
Strikebound won the main award at the Karlovy Vary International Film Festival.

In Australia, film won the AFI Award for Best Achievement in Production Design (Tracy Watt, Harry Zettel, McGregor Knox, and Neil Angwin). It was also nominated in the following categories:

- Best Film (Miranda Bain, Tim White)
- Best Performance by an Actor in a Leading Role (Chris Haywood)
- Best Performance by an Actress in a Leading Role (Carol Burns)
- Best Adapted Screenplay (Richard Loewenstein)
- Best Achievement in Cinematography (Andrew de Groot)
- Best Achievement in Editing (Jill Bilcock)
- Best Achievement in Sound (Dean Gawen, Gethin Creagh, Frank Lipson, Martin Oswin, Rex Watts)
- Best Achievement in Costume Design (Jennie Tate)
