= Maya Gnyp =

Australian film producer

Maya Gnyp is an Academy Award and EMMY Award nominated film producer.

She produced the documentary, I Am Ready, Warden (2024) and was an executive producer of the TV Series Muslim Matchmaker (2025), commissioned by ABC New Studios and released by Hulu and Disney+. I Am Ready, Warden was nominated for the Short Documentary Academy Award during the 97th Oscars, has won two prizes at the Austin Film Festival, and was part of the DocNYC and CinemaEye Shortlists in 2024.

In 2026 she Executive Produced the docu-series created by Smriti Mundhra, Bollywood Dance U, with her partners at Amplify Pics, and 30West.

She has produced the episode "Shelter" for the series Through Our Eyes, and the films Mystify: Michael Hutchence, Finding the Field, Ecco Homo, In Bob We Trust, and Autoluminescent: Rowland S. Howard. "Shelter" won the Audience Award at the 2021 AFI DOCS Film Festival and the 2022 Directors Guild of America Award for Outstanding Children's Program. It was nominated for the 2022 NAACP Image Award for Outstanding Short Form Series or Special, and was nominated for the 2022 Humanitas Prize (Best Documentary), and the 2022 News and Documentary Emmy Award for Outstanding Short Documentary.

Maya was educated at The University of Melbourne, Victoria, The University of California at Berkeley, and at IE Business School. She lives and works between Los Angeles, California and Melbourne, Victoria.

== Filmography ==
Year	Title	Role	
2026	Bollywood Dance U	Executive Producer	4-episode docu-series
2024	I Am Ready, Warden	Producer	American short documentary film directed by Smriti Mundhra, shortlisted for the Best Documentary Short Film at the 97th Academy Awards.
2024	Muslim Matchmaker	Executive Producer	8-episode docu-series
2021	Shelter	Producer	
2021	Eyes on The Prize: Hallowed Ground	Associate Producer	
2019	Mystify: Michael Hutchence	Producer	
2018	Finding the Field	Producer	
2015	Ecco Homo	Producer	
2013	In Bob We Trust	Producer	
2011	Autoluminescent	Producer	
2011	Ben Lee: Catch My Disease	Line Producer	
