= Church of Ecce Homo =

Church of Ecce Homo may refer to:

- Convent of the Sisters of Zion, a convent in the Old City of Jerusalem whose site includes the Church of Ecce Homo
- Ecce Homo, Alcamo, a former church in Alcamo, Sicily
