= This Time (INXS song) =

Single by INXS

from the album Listen Like Thieves
- Released: November 1985
- Recorded: 1985
- Genre: Rock; pop; pop rock
- Length: 3:11
- Label: Atlantic
- Songwriter: Andrew Farriss
- Producer: Chris Thomas

INXS singles chronology
"What You Need" (1985)	"This Time" (1985)	"Kiss the Dirt (Falling Down the Mountain)" (1986)

"This Time" is a song recorded by the Australian band INXS. It is from their 1985 album Listen Like Thieves. "This Time" was the second single after "What You Need" in Australia and New Zealand, but album's lead single elsewhere. It reached the top 20 in Australia. It was the only song from the album solely written by Andrew Farriss.

== B-sides ==
The single was released with various b-sides. The Australian version had the "countryesque" "Sweet as Sin", one of the few INXS songs written solely by Garry Gary Beers or sung by him. The UK release had an extended remix of "Original Sin". In the U.S., the b-side was "I'm Over You", written and sung by Jon Farriss.

== Reception ==
AllMusic wrote "With its soft guitar start, suggesting the Byrds just enough while not playing the revivalist card too openly, INXS then shifts into its fine full-band arrangements, building steadily up to one of the band's best-ever choruses. Michael Hutchence delivers the title with just enough drama and intensity while not absolutely going nuts (what Bono would have made of it can only be imagined in nightmares)."

Reviewed at the time of release, Rolling Stone wrote the song was "another grabby pop song with folkish high harmonies on the chorus." In 2004, it wrote the song " borrowed from U2 a trance- rock momentum." Trouser Press noted it was one of many songs on the album with "solid melodies, strong rhythms and decisive hooks". Cash Box said that the song is "an excellent guitar rocker which draws from American pop music and the band’s own Australian musical heritage."

== Track listing ==
Australian 7" 7-258836

1. "This Time" – 3:11
2. "Sweet as Sin" – 2:20

UK 7" INXS 5

1. "This Time" – 3:11
2. "Original Sin (Extended Version)" – 2:20

US 7" single 7-89497

1. "This Time" – 3:11
2. "I'm Over You" – 4:08

== Charts ==
Chart (1986)	Peak position
Australia (Kent Music Report)	19
Netherlands (Dutch Top 40 Tipparade)	16
New Zealand (Recorded Music NZ)	40
UK Singles Chart	79
US Billboard Hot 100	81
US Billboard Mainstream Rock Tracks	11
