= Reen Nalli =

American music executive (born 1951)

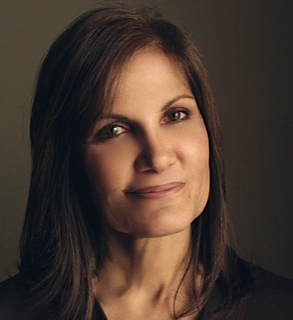

Background information
- Born: February 8, 1951 (age 74); Detroit, Michigan, United States
- Occupation(s): Owner and President, A&R Consultants
- Years active: 1970s–present
- Labels: A&R Consultants (2001–present); Universal Music Group (1995–2010); ATCO Records (1979–1993); Big Tree Records (1971–1979)
- Website: www.aandrconsultants.com

Reen Nalli (born February 8, 1951) is an American music executive. She is the current president of A&R Consultants. She has worked with the likes of INXS, Blue October, and India.Arie.

== Early life and career ==
Reen Nalli was born in Detroit, Michigan, United States, and attended Belleville High School. Her family owned and operated a music store called Al Nalli Music in Ann Arbor where she worked after school. She attended Eastern Michigan University but never graduated.

== Career at Big Tree Records ==
In 1971 Nalli traveled to New York to learn the record business after her brother, Al Nalli signed Brownsville Station (band) to Big Tree Records. This is where she met Dick Webber who would introduce her to Doug Morris who became one of Nalli's mentors. Years later, after working as a receptionist she worked her way up within the company and was given the position of National Promotion Director when Dick Webber left the label.

== ATCO Records ==
After Morris sold Big Tree Records he became the President of the revised ATCO Records making Nalli his Vice President in 1979. Nalli was in charge of promoting, marketing, and publicizing the label's roster including Pete Townsend's solo project as well as overseeing all of Atlantic's custom labels, such as Led Zeppelin's Swan Song Records, the Rolling Stones’ Rolling Stones Records, and Stevie Nick's Modern Records. Nalli signed the band Yes to ATCO, reviving their career with the release of their album 90125, which ended up being the biggest record of their career and spent most of 1984 in Billboard's Top 10. In 1981 Nalli brought the Australian rock band INXS to ATCO and they released Shabooh Shoobah, which ended up going gold. In 1987 they released their biggest selling album Kick which went Platinum six times in the US and had four Top Ten hits including the number one hit “Need You Tonight”. Doug Morris became the President of Atlantic Records and in 1981 Nalli became the head of ATCO Records.

== Universal Music Group to present ==
After 14 years, Nalli returned to Ann Arbor where she began A&R Consultants a grassroots marketing and promotion company doing work with various labels such as Atlantic Records, Interscope, Geffen, and Epic. She eventually closed the doors on her company and returned to her family's music store Nalli Music in the 1990s. She would later relocate to Nashville to begin working as a consultant for Universal Music Group.

She brought a number of artists to Universal Music Group including Platinum selling rock band Blue October. One of Nalli's greatest finds would be neo-soul songstress India.Arie, who she found after her 1999 Lilith Fair performance. Nalli then brought Arie to Nashville to begin working on her music and in 2001 her debut Acoustic Soul was RIAA Double Platinum Certified.

Nalli reopened A&R Consultants in 2001 as a consulting and management company working with artists such as Griffin House, Joe Robinson, Kris Thomas, and Luis Resto (musician).

In 2014, an Australian miniseries called INXS: Never Tear Us Apart based on the rise of INXS was broadcast. It featured Australian actress Jacinta Stapleton in the role of Nalli.
