= Don't Change =

- Artwork for Australian and US releases

Single by INXS

from the album Shabooh Shoobah
- B-side: "Go West"
- Released: 27 October 1982
- Genre: Rock; pub rock; disco-punk; new wave
- Length: 4:24
- Label: WEA
- Songwriter: INXS
- Producer: Mark Opitz

INXS singles chronology
"The One Thing" (1982)	"Don't Change" (1982)	"To Look at You" (1983)

Music video
- "Don't Change" on YouTube

"Don't Change" is a song by Australian rock band INXS. It was released as a single from the album Shabooh Shoobah in October 1982. It has been described as the song that made the band internationally famous.

== Reception ==
Cash Box reviewed the "Don't Change" single saying "churning rhythms and swirling guitars provide a straight ahead forward thrust for singer Michael Hutchence's philosophical pronouncements."

"Don't Change" peaked at number 14 on the Australian Singles Charts and reached number 80 on the Billboard Hot 100 and number 17 on the Billboard Top Tracks chart.

In February 2014, after the Channel 7 screening of INXS: Never Tear Us Apart mini-series, "Don't Change" charted again in Australia via download sales. It peaked at #92 on the ARIA Singles Chart.

In 2017, the song was selected for preservation in the National Film and Sound Archive's Sounds of Australia collection.

In January 2018, as part of Triple M's "Ozzest 100", the 'most Australian' songs of all time, "Don't Change" was ranked number 28.

In a retrospective review, Allmusic described the song as "one of the best rock songs of the 1980s".

== Music video ==
The music video, directed by Scott Hicks, was originally planned to be filmed on an airport runway in South Australia, but was cancelled due to bad weather, so filming took place in a nearby airport hangar.

Hutchence knew Hicks, and had performed on two songs included on the soundtrack of an earlier feature film directed by him, Freedom. The two tracks, "Speed Kills" and "Forest Theme", were written by Don Walker (Cold Chisel). "Speed Kills" was Hutchence's first solo single and was released by WEA in early 1982.

== Uses in media and other versions ==
"Don't Change" plays during the credits of the movie Adventureland and is featured on its soundtrack.

The song has been covered by Brandon Flowers, Everclear, Face to Face, Goo Goo Dolls, Grinspoon, AFI, Bruce Springsteen, Lazlo Bane and Limp Bizkit.

== Track listing ==
7" single Track listing

No.	Title	Writer(s)	Length
1.	"Don't Change"	M. Hutchence, A. Farriss, T. Farris, J. Farris, K. Pengilly, G. Beers	4:24
2.	"Go West"	J. Bushelman, A. Farriss, K. Pengilly	3:10

== Charts ==
Chart (1982)	Peak position
Australia (Kent Music Report)	14
US Billboard Hot 100	80
US Mainstream Rock (Billboard)	17

== Certifications ==
Region	Certification	Certified units/sales
Australia (ARIA)	Gold	35,000^{^}
New Zealand (RMNZ)	Gold	15,000^{‡}
^{^} Shipments figures based on certification alone.^{‡} Sales+streaming figures based on certification alone.
