= To Look at You =

Single by INXS

from the album Shabooh Shoobah
- Released: March 1983
- Recorded: January, June 1982
- Studio: Paradise, Rhinoceros (Sydney)
- Genre: Rock, pop
- Length: 3:54
- Label: Atco, WEA
- Songwriter: Andrew Farriss
- Producer: Mark Opitz

INXS singles chronology
"Don't Change" (1982)	"To Look at You" (1983)	"Black and White" (1983)

"To Look at You" is the ninth single by Australian rock group INXS, and the third released from their third studio album Shabooh Shoobah (1982). The single was released in March 1983 by Atco and WEA.

== B-side ==
The B-side is the instrumental track "The Sax Thing", which already appeared on the single "The One Thing". The double 7" single also features "You Never Used to Cry" and "Here Comes II".

After the success of "The One Thing" and "Don't Change", this single was only released in seven-inch vinyl format. There was no edition released in Europe—only the editions in Australia and in the United States. Therefore, the song could only enter the Australian and US charts, peaking at number 36 in ARIA charts and at 80 in the Billboard 100.

== Music videos ==
The music video for the song was directed by South Australian director Scott Hicks, later known for his award-winning film Shine.

== Reception ==
Of the song, Cash Box said that "Michael Hutchence intones the lyrics upon a 'Shabooh Shoobah' drumbeat" and that "when guitars finally do enter the picture, they seem to slice the melody in half."

== Track listing ==
No.	Title	Writer(s)	Length
1.	"To Look at You"	Andrew Farriss	3:54
2.	"The Sax Thing"	Kirk Pengilly	2:58
