= INXS: Never Tear Us Apart =

2014 Australian television miniseries

- INXS: Never Tear Us Apart logo
- Based on: INXS
- Written by: Dave Warner; Justin Monjo
- Directed by: Daina Reid
- Starring: Damon Herriman; Luke Arnold; Andrew Ryan; Hugh Sheridan; Alex Williams; Ido Drent; Nick Masters
- Theme music composer: Mark Opitz
- Country of origin: Australia
- Original language: English
- No. of episodes: 2

Production
- Producers: Julie McGauran; Kerrie Mainwaring; Andrew Prowse
- Cinematography: Bruce Young
- Editor: Rodrigo Balart
- Running time: 84 minutes
- Production company: Shine Australia

Original release
- Network: Seven Network
- Release: 9 February – 16 February 2014

INXS: Never Tear Us Apart is a two-part Australian miniseries about the rock band INXS and was originally telecast on 9 February 2014, and concluded on 16 February 2014, produced by Shine Australia and airing on the Seven Network.

== Synopsis ==
INXS: Never Tear Us Apart is based on the band's rise to stardom, and focuses on the events leading up to the death of its then-lead singer, Michael Hutchence, in November 1997.

In the early 1980s in Perth, Western Australia, the Farriss Brothers are playing covers at a club with Michael Hutchence on vocals. They are eventually kicked out of the club and their current manager changes the band name to INXS after seeing an IXL commercial then seeing an X and an S and combining them. The police start searching their house for drugs and find a half-smoked joint. Other band members are Jon Farriss, Andrew Farriss, Garry Gary Beers, Kirk Pengilly, and Tim Farriss. They eventually sign on to a record label thanks to Chris Murphy who becomes their new manager. He eventually gets a U.S. tour for three months. Flashbacks show a younger Hutchence being bullied at school and joining the Farriss Brothers band as lead singer. Hutchence starts to date Michele Bennett. He breaks up with her then starts going out with Kylie Minogue.

Murphy advises them to write an album full of singles where he has Hutchence and Andrew writing the songs. They write the single "Need You Tonight" and call the album Kick. Murphy sells the album without record label's consent. The album eventually becomes a hit. Hutchence breaks up with Minogue and begins dating supermodel Helena Christensen. While he and Christensen are out one night, he suffers a sucker punch to the face. He falls and hits his head making him lose his senses of smell and taste, as well as causing dark mood swings. Realising that they are not popular anymore, Murphy suggest that they turn to Grunge music, but they say no. The band takes time off to spend time with their families, while Hutchence begins an affair with Paula Yates, who is married to Bob Geldof. The couple are followed around by the press so much that Hutchence punches a camera man. Paula and Bob go through a public and messy divorce, with Bob being awarded full custody of their three daughters.

Yates becomes pregnant and gives birth to their daughter Tiger Lily and they become a family. Murphy also resigns from INXS. The band and Hutchence get back together to make Elegantly Wasted and start touring again. After practice, in preparation for their 20th anniversary tour, Hutchence goes to his hotel room on 22 November 1997, where he makes various calls, including checking up on the progress of a potential custody agreement between Bob and Paula, which would allow Paula to bring Tiger and her other daughters to Australia for Christmas. However Paula informs Michael that the custody hearing is being adjourned until 17 December and that consequently she would not be bringing their daughter (not wanting to separate Tiger from her sisters) out to Australia. Hutchence angrily phones Geldof, blaming him for the outcome of the hearing and ranting, "She's not your wife anymore!". He then falls into depression and calls Michele for help. The next day at practice, INXS turns on the TV only to see the news of Hutchence's suicide. Tim is especially devastated as he and Michael had an argument and never had the chance to make up. The series ends with actual clips of the real INXS playing live.

== Cast ==
- Luke Arnold as Michael Hutchence
- Toby Wallace as a young Hutchence
- Damon Herriman as Chris Murphy
- Andrew Ryan as Andrew Farriss
- Hugh Sheridan as Garry Gary Beers
- Alex Williams as Kirk Pengilly
- Ido Drent as Jon Farriss
- Nick Masters as Tim Farriss
- Samantha Jade as Kylie Minogue
- Georgina Haig as Paula Yates
- Jane Harber as Michele Bennett
- Mallory Jansen as Helena Christensen
- Jacinta Stapleton as Reen Nalli
- Ali Ryrie-Golding as Julie
- Freya Stafford as Kim D
- Ryan Johnson as Gary Morris
- Sarah Roberts as Shelley
- Brett Swain as Dez Jose
- John Adam as Kel Hutchence
- Jane Allsop as Pat Hutchence

== Production ==
The Mini Series was executively produced by Chris Murphy and Tim Farriss (INXS Guitarist).

Filming of the television miniseries took place throughout the second half of 2013, with post-production taking place in October 2013. The miniseries is the only biopic to have the right to use the band's music. The miniseries was aired in two parts on Sunday evenings, and commenced 9 February 2014.

== Reception ==
The first part of the miniseries achieved a national ratings audience of 2.243 million, winning its timeslot. The first part aired against a television film on Nine Network entitled Schapelle about Schapelle Corby, which attracted 1.153 million viewers.

The second part of the series achieved a national ratings audience of 2.081 million, also winning its timeslot.

Episode	Air date	Viewers (millions)	Nightly rank	Consolidated viewers (millions)	Adjusted rank	Source
"Part 1"	Sunday, 9 February 2014	1.974	#1	2.243	#1	
"Part 2"	Sunday, 16 February 2014	1.767	#2	2.081	#1	

== Impact on ARIA charts ==
The week following the airing, INXS's albums and singles had a resurgence on the Australian ARIA Charts.

Albums

- The Very Best – #1
- Kick – #2
- Live at Wembley Stadium 1991 – #17
- The Swing – #25
- Shabooh Shoobah – #33
- Listen Like Thieves – #36

Singles

- "Never Tear Us Apart" – #11
- "Need You Tonight" – #28

== Awards and nominations ==
Award	Category	Subject	Result
AACTA Awards (4th)	Best Telefeature, Mini Series or Short Run Series	Julie McGauran	Nominated
AACTA Awards (4th)	Best Telefeature, Mini Series or Short Run Series	Kerrie Mainwaring	Nominated
AACTA Awards (4th)	Best Telefeature, Mini Series or Short Run Series	Andrew Prowse	Nominated
AACTA Awards (4th)	Best Direction in Television	Daina Reid	Nominated
AACTA Awards (4th)	Best Lead Actor in a Television Drama	Luke Arnold	Nominated
AACTA Awards (4th)	Best Guest or Supporting Actor in a Television Drama	Andy Ryan	Nominated
Logie Awards (57th)	Most Popular Drama Program	INXS: Never Tear Us Apart	Nominated
Logie Awards (57th)	Most Popular Actor	Luke Arnold	Nominated
Logie Awards (57th)	Most Popular New Talent	Laura Brent	Nominated
Logie Awards (57th)	Most Popular New Talent	Samantha Jade	Nominated
Logie Awards (57th)	Most Outstanding Miniseries or Telemovie	INXS: Never Tear Us Apart	Nominated
Logie Awards (57th)	Most Outstanding Actor	Luke Arnold	Won
