= Memories and Dreams =

1993 documentary film

Memories and Dreams is a 1993 feature documentary film about actress Johanna Kilma-Ocenaskova, directed by Lynn-Maree Milburn. Part fairytale and part drama, the film tells a tale of loss and renewal in which romantic love is but one of many passions. Set almost entirely in Prague, it chronicles the life of Czech-born actress Johanna Kilma-Ocenaskova, from a childhood of freedom and fantasy to the unexpected horrors of World War II and her eventual escape to Australia.

== Festivals and awards ==
- Hot Docs - Canadian International Documentary Festival (2000)
- Australian Film Week - Ireland (1996)
- Yamagata International Documentary Film Festival(1995)
- Australian Cinematographers Society Awards National (1995)
- Aurora Australis: New Independent Film from Australia (1995)
- Würzburg Film Festival (1994)
- Telluride Film Festival(1994)
- International Film Festival Rotterdam (1994)
- Mediawave International Festival of Visual Arts (1994)
- Ljubljana International Film Festival (1994)
- Laboratorio Immagine Donna (1994)
- Hong Kong International Film Festival (1994)
- Dublin Film Festival (1994)
- Creteil Film Des Femmes Festival (1994)
- Cologne Film Festival (1994)
- Brussels International Festival of Cartoons and Animated Films Dessin Anime (1994)
- Berkley Women's Film Festival (1994)
- The International Animation Festival (1994)
- Venice International Film Festival (1993)
- Toronto International Film Festival (1993)
- Melbourne International Film Festival (1993)
- London Film Festival (1993)
- Leipzig International Festival of Documentary and Animation Films (1993)
- Australian Film Institute (1993)
