= The Swing (album) =

Studio album by INXS
- Released: 21 March 1984
- Recorded: September–December 1983
- Studios: Power Station, New York City, US; The Manor, Oxfordshire, UK; Rhinoceros, Sydney, Australia; Emerald City, Sydney, Australia; Paradise, Sydney, Australia
- Genres: New wave; funk rock; dance-rock
- Length: 42:40
- Labels: WEA, Mercury, Atco
- Producers: Nick Launay, Nile Rodgers

INXS chronology
Dekadance (1983)	The Swing (1984)	Listen Like Thieves (1985)

Singles from The Swing
- 1. "Original Sin" Released: December 1983; 2. "I Send a Message" Released: March 1984; 3. "Burn for You" Released: July 1984; 4. "Dancing on the Jetty" Released: October 1984

The Swing is the fourth studio album by Australian rock band INXS, released on 21 March 1984. It peaked at number one on the Kent Music Report Albums Chart for five non-consecutive weeks from early April to mid-May 1984. The lead single "Original Sin" was recorded in New York City with Nile Rodgers and featured Daryl Hall on backing vocals. Overall, the album featured a slightly harder-edged sound than their previous releases.

== Background ==
By 1983 Australian rock band INXS attempted to expand their international profile with their fourth studio album, The Swing. The Sydney-based group had formed in 1977 by three brothers Andrew on guitar and keyboards; Jon on percussion and drums; and Tim Farriss on guitar; together with Garry Gary Beers on bass guitar; Michael Hutchence on lead vocals; and Kirk Pengilly on guitar, saxophone, and vocals.

In September 1983 the band travelled to New York City to work with Nile Rodgers as producer at the Power Station. It was the first time the group had recorded outside Australia and provided the album's lead single, "Original Sin" (December 1983). Rodgers asked Daryl Hall of Hall & Oates to guest on backing vocals for the chorus, Hall later recalled "I don't know why because they're good singers, they didn't need me but I did it anyway".

All four singles were co-written by Andrew with Hutchence, while other album tracks were generally written with one or more additional band members.

From December INXS were working with Nick Launay (Midnight Oil, Models) at The Manor Studio in Oxfordshire, to complete the rest of the album. A cassette extended play of remixes, Dekadance, was also released in Australia.

== Release ==
The Swing peaked at number one on the Australian Kent Music Report Albums Chart for five non-consecutive weeks from early April to mid-May 1984. It remained in the top 100 for over 100;weeks. On the New Zealand Albums Chart it reached No. 6.

Beyond its local success, this album, as its predecessor, entered the US Top 75, reaching No. 52 on the Billboard 200; it also entered the Canadian Top 40, where it reached No. 27 on the RPM 100 Albums. In Europe, The Swing entered the Top 20 in France due to the big success of its single "Original Sin" which reached the French Top 5 during the summer of 1984; and the Top 40 in the Netherlands.

In October 2010, The Swing, was listed in the book, 100 Best Australian Albums at No. 56, with their 1987 album, Kick at No. 11. In 2011 The Swing was re-released as a remastered edition. The remastering engineer was Giovanni Scatola. In February 2014 The Swing returned to the top 50 on the ARIA Albums Chart, with the local airing of a mini-series, INXS: Never Tear Us Apart, on the Seven Network.

== Critical reception ==
Professional ratings
Review scores
Source	Rating
The Albuquerque Tribune	A−
AllMusic	3/5 stars
The Ann Arbor News	(favorable)
Mono Herald and Bridgeport Chronicle-Union	(favorable)
MusicHound Rock	3/5
The Orlando Sentinel	4/5 stars
(The New)Rolling Stone Album Guide	3/5 stars

AllMusic's Stephen Thomas Erlewine noted that The Swing "retains the new wave pop sense and rock attack of their earlier albums, while adding a stronger emphasis on dance rhythms". He liked the improved songwriting "with more than half of the album featuring memorable hooks". Zac Johnson, also of AllMusic, said "Raw and jittering, The Swing arrived before the megahits Listen Like Thieves, Kick, and X, and is a perfect bridge between their punked - up new wave early albums and the pop powerhouses they would still become."

Australian musicologist Ian McFarlane opined that "[it] boasted all the confident swagger and accomplished rock hooks of a band on the cusp of international acceptance". Fellow Australian journalists, John O'Donnell, Toby Creswell and Craig Mathieson, found that Rodgers' effort with "Original Sin" had delivered a track with a "confident rhythm" and helped the band so that "they now had focus; the lyrical image ... fitted their circumstances". Meanwhile, Launay, after hearing that track, "accepted the challenge" of providing a "sense of reinvention" for the group so that "post-punk affectations and new romantic plumage were fading away, revealing a rock band with funk leanings and pop instincts".

Rolling Stone Australia listed The Swing at number 32 on the list of the 200 greatest Australian albums of all time, while Slicing Up Eyeballs' ranked it number 11 on their list of the 100 greatest albums of 1984."

== Track listing ==
All tracks are written by Andrew Farriss and Michael Hutchence, unless otherwise indicated

Side one
No.	Title	Writer(s)	Length
1.	"Original Sin"		5:19
2.	"Melting in the Sun"	Tim Farriss, Jon Farriss, Hutchence	3:25
3.	"I Send a Message"		3:24
4.	"Dancing on the Jetty"		4:34
5.	"The Swing"	Garry Gary Beers, A. Farriss, T. Farriss, Hutchence, Kirk Pengilly, J. Farriss	3:52

Side two
No.	Title	Writer(s)	Length
6.	"Johnson's Aeroplane"	A. Farriss	3:53
7.	"Love Is (What I Say)"	Beers, A. Farriss, T. Farriss, Hutchence, Pengilly, J. Farriss, Ananda Braxton-Smith	3:42
8.	"Face the Change"	J. Farriss, Hutchence, Pengilly	3:34
9.	"Burn for You"		4:59
10.	"All the Voices"		6:06
Total length:			42:40

== Personnel ==
INXS

- Michael Hutchence – vocals
- Andrew Farriss – keyboards, guitars, string arrangements
- Kirk Pengilly – guitars, saxophone, vocals
- Tim Farriss – guitars, bass
- Garry Gary Beers – basses
- Jon Farriss – drums, percussion, vocals

Additional musicians

- William Motzing – string arrangements
- Daryl Hall – backing vocals on "Original Sin"
- Sherine Abeyratne – backing vocals
- Andrew Duffield – backing vocals
- Kim Liat Edwards – backing vocals
- Sean Kelly – backing vocals
- Norma Lewis – backing vocals
- Jenny Morris – backing vocals
- Frank Simms – backing vocals
- David Spinner – backing vocals

Production

- Nile Rodgers – producer (1)
- Nick Launay – producer (2–10), engineer (2–10), mixing
- Jason Corsaro – engineer (1)
- Jeremy Allom – assistant engineer
- Stuart Breed – assistant engineer
- Steve "Barney" Chase – assistant engineer
- Paul Cook – assistant engineer
- David Price – assistant engineer
- Ross – assistant engineer
- Alan Wright – assistant engineer
- Philip Mortlock – cover design, photography
- Jon Watkins – artwork
- Michael Putland – front group photography, black and white photography
- Paul Clarke – photography
- Kirk Pengilly – photography
- Mixed at Townhouse Studios, AIR Studios, Sarm East Studios and Sarm West Studios (London, UK)

== Charts ==
=== Weekly charts ===
Weekly chart performance for The Swing
Chart (1984–1986)	Peak position
Australian Albums (Kent Music Report)	1
Canadian Albums (RPM)	27
French Albums (SNEP)	14
Dutch Albums (Album Top 100)	37
New Zealand Albums (RMNZ)	6
US Billboard 200	52

=== Year-end charts ===
Year-end chart performance for The Swing
Chart (1984)	Position
Australian Albums Chart	4
New Zealand Albums (RMNZ)	21
Chart (1985)	Position
Australian Albums Chart	31

=== Decade-end charts ===
Decade-end chart performance for The Swing
Chart (1980–1989)	Position
Australian Albums Chart	19

== Certifications ==
Certifications for The Swing
Region	Certification	Certified units/sales
Australia (ARIA)	6× Platinum	420,000^{^}
New Zealand (RMNZ)	Platinum	15,000^{^}
United States (RIAA)	Platinum	1,000,000^{^}
^{^} Shipments figures based on certification alone.
