= Dalkeith (film) =

- Directed by: Leigh Sheehan
- Written by: Victor Kazan/Leigh Sheehan (story)
- Produced by: John Chase
- Starring: Ray Barrett; Gus Mercurio; Jacinta Stapleton; Alan Hopgood; Julie Nihill
- Edited by: Martin Fox
- Release date: 2002
- Running time: 93mins
- Country: Australia
- Language: English
- Budget: under A$1million
- Box office: A$10,500 (Australia)

Dalkeith is a film about the story of the residents in the Dalkeith Retirement Home who obtain a greyhound. The movie was marketed to an older audience. They named the dog Dalkeith after the home but due to the intervention of one of the resident's relatives, problems arise.

The film was shot in 15 days in Ballarat and was made with private investment.

== Cast ==
- Ray Barrett as Tarquin St John Smythe
- Gus Mercurio as Enzo Petroni
- Alan Hopgood as Mick
- Julie Nihill as Sally
- Jacinta Stapleton as Kate Johnson
- Tony Bonner as Mick
- Reg Gorman as Len
- Wendy Strehlow as Miss Denham
