= Strictly Speaking (TV series) =

- Presented by: Andrew Hansen
- Judges: Michael Gurr; Jean Kittson; Father Bob Maguire; Leigh Sales
- Country of origin: Australia
- Original language: English
- No. of series: 1
- No. of episodes: 5 aired, 13 total

Production
- Running time: 30 minutes
- Production company: Southern Star Entertainment

Original release
- Network: ABC1
- Release: 29 September – 25 October 2010 (5 episodes)

Strictly Speaking is an Australian television series which began airing on ABC1 on 29 September 2010. The show is hosted by Andrew Hansen. After only 5 episodes, Strictly Speaking was removed from ABC's schedule after failing to attract viewers. On 5 June 2011, the show returned to ABC1 in a new Sunday timeslot.

== Format ==
The format of Strictly Speaking is based around that of a talent show where contestants compete for the title of Australia's best speaker. Each episode, three contestants perform a prepared speech and an impromptu speech in two individual rounds. The first round consists of each contestant performing a prepared speech. At the end of the round the judges decide on a score for each contestant. In the second round, contestants are given a topic to briefly prepare an impromptu speech from. At the end of the second round the judges again gives scores to each contestant, in effect announcing the winner for that episode.

=== Judging Criteria ===
Speeches are judged on the criteria of content, delivery, entertainment and other considerations. In the area of content, contestants are assessed on the subject matter; originality; creativity; quality of writing; structure; clarity and effectiveness of argument; and appropriateness of the speech. In the area of delivery, contestants are assessed on whether the speech was natural or practised; pitch, pace and volume; appearance; fluency; and emotion. In the area of entertainment, speeches are assessed on whether the performance connected with the audience; charisma; and personality. The final judging criteria are that of other considerations where performances are assessed on whether the speaker was speaking to everyone; whether the speaker could have varied pace more; whether the gestures matched the speech; and whether the speech was reasonably within the time limit.

Additional criteria are brought in for the second round to assess the impromptu speech. Judges consider whether the speech addressed the topic; how the topic was used in the speech; originality; whether it featured a logical structure; and whether the argument was concise.

== Production ==
In July 2009, a contestant call went out for anyone who could be considered as a talented or confident public speaker. One month later, auditions for the show began. The auditions narrowed down over 1,500 applications into just 27 spots in the show's first series. On 31 August 2009, it was announced that Andrew Hansen would be the host for the show. On 8 December 2009, the Australian Broadcasting Corporation announced its programming lineup for 2010 which included Strictly Speaking. On 13 September 2010, it was announced that Strictly Speaking would fill the slot that The New Inventors vacated after its grand final on 22 September 2010. The first series began showing on 29 September 2010.

== Episodes ==
Indicates the winner of that round.
Indicates the winner of that round (draw).
Indicates the losers of that round.

=== Series 1 ===
No.	Air Date	Contestants	Round 1 Score	Round 2 Score	Total Score	Notes
1	29 September 2010	Charlie Perry	7	7	14	
1	29 September 2010	Brendan Morant	7.5	5	12.5	
1	29 September 2010	Rebecca Macintosh	6	7	13	
2	6 October 2010	Stephanie Cooper	8	7	15	
2	6 October 2010	Daniel Hobley	8	8	16	
2	6 October 2010	Dana Maray	8	8.5	16.5	
3	13 October 2010	Joe Ware	7.5	8	15.5	
3	13 October 2010	Jennifer Neumann	7.5	7	14.5	
3	13 October 2010	Nat Ware	7	7.5	14.5	
4	20 October 2010	Matthew Robertson	7.5	7.5	15	
4	20 October 2010	Alicia Nowak	8	7	15	
4	20 October 2010	Mark Yettica-Paulson	8.5	8.5	17	
5	27 October 2010	Joe Rafalowicz	7	7	14	
5	27 October 2010	Sue Harold	6	6	12	
5	27 October 2010	Josh Hampton	6	7	13	
6	10 July 2011	Steve Widders	8	8	16	
6	10 July 2011	Lonie Pizarro	7.5	7.5	15	
6	10 July 2011	Lisa Maxwell	7	7	14	
7	17 July 2011	Mary Jane Boughen	7	6	13	
7	17 July 2011	Taylor Bunnag	6.5	8	14.5	
7	17 July 2011	Sam Almaliki	7	7	14	
8	24 July 2011	Toby Halligan	6	8	14	
8	24 July 2011	Krystal Cathcart	7	6	13	
8	24 July 2011	Bill Stuth	6	6	12	
9	31 July 2011	Joel Doutch	7.5	7.5	15	
9	31 July 2011	Rosie Sitorus	7	7	14	
9	31 July 2011	Steve Wisbey	7	6.5	13.5	
Semi Finals
10	7 August 2011	Joel Doutch	8	7	15	
10	7 August 2011	Dana Maray	7.5	7	14.5	
10	7 August 2011	Joe Ware	9	8	17	
11	14 August 2011	Mark Yettica-Paulson	7.5	8.5	16	
11	14 August 2011	Joe Rafalowicz	7	7	14	
11	14 August 2011	Toby Halligan	7.5	8	15.5	
12	21 August 2011	Taylor Bunnag	7	7	14	
12	21 August 2011	Charlie Perry	7.5	7.5	15	
12	21 August 2011	Steve Widders	7	7	14	
Grand Final
13	28 August 2011	Charlie Perry	8	6.5	14.5	
13	28 August 2011	Mark Yettica-Paulson	8.5	8	16.5	
13	28 August 2011	Joe Ware	8.5	7.5	16	

== Reception ==
The ratings for the first episode weren't positive. The Spy Report stated "Strictly Speaking struggled to make an impression, averaging 586,000 viewers". The second episode received fewer viewers but ranked slightly better for the Wednesday ratings.

=== Ratings ===
No.	Viewers	Rank (timeslot)	Rank (day)	Notes
1	586,000	4	27	
2	442,000	4	24	
3	410,000	4	25	
4	436,000	4	29	
5	390,000	4	32	
6	TBA			
