= Musclecar =

MUSCLECAR
- Film poster
- Directed by: Dwayne Labbé
- Written by: Dwayne Labbé
- Produced by: Aaran Creece
- Starring: Jacinta Stapleton
- Cinematography: Darrell Martin
- Edited by: Wayne Dickson; Nathan Burgess
- Music by: Brent Heber; Damien Kalinowski; Boris Sujdovic; Paul Vainickis; Shamus Baldwin
- Production company: SpeedMeatway Productions
- Release date: November 2017
- Running time: 77 minutes
- Country: Australia
- Language: English
- Budget: $175,000

Musclecar is a 2017 Australian comedy horror science fiction film written and directed by Dwayne Labbé Produced by Aaran Creece and starring Jacinta Stapleton.

== Plot ==
Wannabe filmmaker ‘BAMBI’ has just spent her last lump of cash on her film's main prop, a big red beast of an American muscle car. Her obsession turns B-Grade when she discovers a way to run the car on BLOOD. Bambi's unholy spiral into insanity begins using Voodoo she sacrifices her cast one by one needing their blood and their souls. With an OX HEART bolted to the engine it becomes the car's beating ‘heart-muscle’. Now there's no stopping Bambi or her MUSCLECAR.

== Synopsis ==
Bambi Steele is a low budget filmmaker. She is waiting to hear about a one million dollar investment so she can make her debut feature film. When she receives a phone call from Merlin, her agent whose dealing with the investor giving her the Green-light Bambi is obviously ecstatic.

The main prop for her B-Grade horror film is an American muscle car. Bambi loves muscle cars but she's never owned one until now. She takes all her money from her savings account and buys the car telling her friend Kat, that even though she's spending all her money on a car she's not concerned because the money from the investor will be in her account the very next day.

The reality is that the deal goes sour and the finance falls through. A devastated Bambi calls a meeting for her cast to tell them the bad news. In a vote of solidarity the cast members led by leading man Randy, take her to the local Pub to drown their sorrows.

Randy, has a thing for Bambi and it becomes obvious that he will do anything for her.

Bambi is angry about the money and that her film has fallen through. More importantly she is worried about losing her car. She has always wanted a big shiny red muscle car and the 1968 Dodge she buys quickly turns into an obsession. She has no film. no fuel in her car and no money to run it she overhears Lochy a Scotsman and one of her cast say that he used to race drag bikes and run them on alcohol.

Suddenly a patron who has been making unwanted advances towards Bambi decides to pick a fight with Randy. In the process he vomits all over Randy's shoes. Randy in a fit of jealous rage picks the guy up by the scruff of the neck and throws him out onto the street. Unluckily for him a car driving by loses control, mounts the kerb hitting the guy and killing him instantly. The driver falls out of the car drunk.

In a panic everyone leaves the scene except for Bambi. She tells Buck to grab his car, she has a plan for the body. In Bambi's garage she gets Buck to help her throw the body on the back of her car. She cuts the guys throat and begins to drain the blood out of him and pour it into her car. Bambi is convinced that she can run the car on the alcohol in the guys blood. Buck is mortified and leaves.

Later Bambi discovers that there is a book called ‘Voodoo Mechanics’ written by Dr Wahissi Tnuca and Prof Dr Voodoo Munguvern. The book tells her that she can bring her car to life by using Voodoo. She rings her brother Buck and he thinks she's crazy. He can't believe that if there is such a book and if you can bring inanimate objects to life like cars then why hasn't he heard about it.

Undeterred, Bambi buys the book and begins the process. She tells Buck that using human blood, an OX heart and the souls of eight people her car will have ‘a life of its own’.

Buck has always helped his harebrained sister with whatever she wanted to do but this time he fears she's gone too far. Bambi needs help. She calls Randy. She tells him that she helped him by cleaning up his mess and now he has to help her. She first asks him to dispose of the body, which he does. Bambi gives him the impression that she likes him and if he helps her get what she needs for her car she will give him something in return.

She starts with an OX Heart which they get from the local abattoir. Using Voodoo incantations as outlined in the book she starts the ritual.

CAR RAMB SHAR GORA GORA VI.

This time she enlists Buck to help put the heart into the car. Like Dr Frankenstein's monster her instruction manual teaches her how to bolt a heart to the cars engine as she switches from using alcohol to blood in the cars engine.

Bambi soon realises that she needs more blood and more souls. Randy has already helped dispose of the body Bambi first used for blood. Now he has no problem bumping off her cast members. In a jealous rage Randy kills Mort with a fry pan and Lochy follows soon after. As people begin to ask questions the body count soon mounts up.

All the while Randy becomes more desperate for Bambi to make good on her promise. Bambi is able to keep Randy at arms length while taking him further down the rabbit hole. She has him right where she wants and needs him to be.

Floyd, another member of her cast begins to feel that something is not quite right as fellow cast members don't return calls and Bambi and Randy appear evasive.

Kat dies next. Bambi is upset when Randy dumps her body on the floor of the garage ‘I liked Kat’. Like a sick puppy or a cat that keeps bringing its master offerings of dead birds or mice. Randy keeps bringing bodies to Bambi. Her obsession with blood and souls is matched only by his obsession with Bambi.

Nick and Lord Fiendish are the next to go. Drunk and angry, Randy wants payment for all the work he's done. As far as he's concerned ‘No means yes’ in his mind. He attacks Bambi and in desperation she calls Buck for help. He arrives just in time to land a heavy blow square on Randy's chin. Randy leaves but not before a thinly veiled threat. ‘This is your last chance Bambi’.

Buck takes Bambi out to look for a place to bury body parts. But when they return her beloved car is missing. Randy calls her. ‘Missing something Bambi?’

Randy has taken her car and he's threatening to kill it. Randy brings back the car on a promise of getting what he wants. Buck confronts Randy and he runs.

But she soon realises that there is something wrong with the car.

Bambi finds out her car is diseased and she will soon pay the ultimate price to bring her beloved Dodge to life.

== Cast ==
- Jacinta Stapleton as Bambi Steele
- Matthew Blackwood-Hume as Buck Steele
- Tai Scrivener as Randy
- Elizabeth Hagan as Kat
- Mark Petlock as Floyd
- Christopher Phillips as Lochy
- Steve Taylor as Mort
- Lord Fiendish as Fiendish
- Paul Armstrong as the Dentist
- Nick Karavokirakos as Nick
- Chris Griffiths as the Drunk Driver

== Review ==
'Horror/Cult's' James Ackland said. Trust me, the ending is so twisted that I was sweating while laughing. Grind on!!

'Fear Forever's' Erin Grant said. One of its messages is that women don't owe their bodies to anyone. Bambi knows this and it makes her an awesome character.

'Beyond Chron' said, Musclecar entertainingly gives lucky viewers gleefully trashy leers and repeatedly sticks its figurative tongue in their ears.

Screen Realm said of the film, "Musclecar is too caught up in trying to become an instant cult-classic that it fails to even be worthy of a viewing."
