= Logie Awards of 2015 =

Australian television awards ceremony

57th Logie Awards
- Date: 3 May 2015
- Site: Crown Palladium, Melbourne, Victoria

Highlights
- Gold Logie: Carrie Bickmore
- Hall of Fame: Home & Away
- Most awards: Home & Away, Love Child, The Project and Wentworth (2)
- Most nominations: Love Child (7)

Television coverage
- Network: Nine Network

The 57th Annual TV Week Logie Awards was held on Sunday 3 May 2015 at the Crown Palladium in Melbourne, and broadcast live on the Nine Network. The red carpet arrivals coverage was hosted by Shelley Craft and Jules Lund.

Public voting for the "most popular" categories began on 12 January 2015 and ended on 22 February 2015. Nominations were announced on 22 March 2015. Television presenter Carrie Bickmore won the Gold Logie Award for Most Popular Personality on Australian Television. Love Child received the most nominations with seven, followed by INXS: Never Tear Us Apart with six. Hamish & Andy's Gap Year South America and Home and Away both received four nominations. Home and Away was inducted into the Logies Hall of Fame.

== Changes ==
On 24 October 2014, TV Week announced that it would be restoring the Most Outstanding Comedy Program category to the 2015 Logie Awards. The industry-voted category had been absent from Logie ceremonies since 2009 and TV Week said the decision to bring it back came after consulting with the industry, as well as listening to feedback from readers, viewers and voters. TV Week editor Emma Nolan stated, "The standard of Australian comedies has been outstanding in 2014 – and we felt that shows in that genre deserved to be judged up against each other in their own category. In recent years, comedy nominees had competed with other genre shows in the Most Outstanding Light Entertainment Program category.

== Winners and nominees ==
In the tables below, winners are listed first and highlighted in bold.

=== Gold Logie ===
Most Popular Personality on Australian Television
- **Carrie Bickmore in The Project (Network Ten)**
  - Hamish Blake in Hamish & Andy's Gap Year South America (Nine Network)
  - Scott Cam in The Block (Nine Network)
  - Asher Keddie in Offspring and Party Tricks (Network Ten)
  - Andy Lee in Hamish & Andy's Gap Year South America (Nine Network)
  - Steve Peacocke in Home and Away (Seven Network)

=== Acting/Presenting ===
Most Popular Actor	Most Popular Actress
**Steve Peacocke in Home and Away (Seven Network)**; Luke Arnold in INXS: Never Tear Us Apart (Seven Network); Chris Lilley in Jonah from Tonga (ABC); Craig McLachlan in The Doctor Blake Mysteries (ABC); Josh Thomas in Please Like Me (ABC2)	**Asher Keddie in Offspring and Party Tricks (Network Ten)**; Jessica Marais in Carlotta (ABC) and Love Child (Nine Network); Mandy McElhinney in Love Child (Nine Network); Julia Morris in House Husbands (Nine Network); Bonnie Sveen in Home and Away (Seven Network)
Most Outstanding Actor	Most Outstanding Actress
**Luke Arnold in INXS: Never Tear Us Apart (Seven Network)**; Martin Henderson in Secrets & Lies (Network Ten); John Noble in Devil's Playground (Showcase); Richard Roxburgh in Rake (ABC); Ashley Zukerman in The Code (ABC)	**Danielle Cormack in Wentworth (SoHo)**; Marta Dusseldorp in Janet King (ABC); Jessica Marais in Carlotta (ABC); Denise Roberts in Schapelle (Nine Network); Nicole da Silva in Wentworth (SoHo)
Most Popular New Talent	Graham Kennedy Award for Most Outstanding Newcomer
**Miranda Tapsell in Love Child (Nine Network)**; Laura Brent in ANZAC Girls (ABC) and INXS: Never Tear Us Apart (Seven Network); Harriet Dyer in Love Child (Nine Network); Samantha Jade in INXS: Never Tear Us Apart (Seven Network); Olympia Valance in Neighbours (Network Ten)	**Miranda Tapsell in Love Child (Nine Network)**; Silvia Colloca in Made In Italy with Silvia Colloca (SBS One); Harriet Dyer in Love Child (Nine Network); Troy Kinne in Kinne (7mate); Brandon McClelland in ANZAC Girls (ABC)
Most Popular Presenter
**Carrie Bickmore in The Project (Network Ten)**; Grant Denyer in Family Feud (Network Ten); Amanda Keller in The Living Room (Network Ten); Andy Lee in Hamish & Andy's Gap Year South America (Nine Network); Karl Stefanovic in Today (Nine Network)

=== Most Popular Programs ===
Most Popular Drama Program	Most Popular Entertainment Program
**Home and Away (Seven Network)**; House Husbands (Nine Network); INXS: Never Tear Us Apart (Seven Network); Love Child (Nine Network); Offspring (Network Ten)	**Hamish & Andy's Gap Year South America (Nine Network)**; Family Feud (Network Ten); The Project (Network Ten); Sunrise (Seven Network); The Voice (Nine Network)
Most Popular Reality Program	Most Popular Sports Program
**The Block (Nine Network)**; Big Brother (Nine Network); Bondi Rescue (Network Ten); Bondi Vet (Network Ten); My Kitchen Rules (Seven Network)	**The NRL Footy Show (Nine Network)**; The AFL Footy Show (Nine Network); The Cricket Show (Nine Network); The Marngrook Footy Show (NITV); Wide World of Sports (Nine Network)
Most Popular Lifestyle Program
**The Living Room (Network Ten)**; Better Homes and Gardens (Seven Network); Getaway (Nine Network); Grand Designs Australia (The LifeStyle Channel); Selling Houses Australia (The LifeStyle Channel)

=== Most Outstanding Programs ===
Most Outstanding Drama Series	Most Outstanding Miniseries or Telemovie
**Wentworth (SoHo)**; The Code (ABC); Janet King (ABC); Puberty Blues (Network Ten); Rake (ABC)	**Devil's Playground (Showcase)**; ANZAC Girls (ABC); The Broken Shore (ABC); Carlotta (ABC); INXS: Never Tear Us Apart (Seven Network)
Most Outstanding Entertainment Program	Most Outstanding Comedy Program
**The Voice (Nine Network)**; Bogan Hunters (7mate); The Chaser's Media Circus (ABC); The Checkout (ABC); Shaun Micallef's Mad as Hell (ABC)	**Utopia (ABC)**; Black Comedy (ABC); Legally Brown (SBS One); Please Like Me (ABC2); Upper Middle Bogan (ABC)
Most Outstanding Children's Program	Most Outstanding Factual Program
**Nowhere Boys (ABC3)**; Bushwhacked! (ABC3); Move It Mob Style (NITV); Tashi (7TWO); Worst Year of My Life Again (ABC3)	**First Contact (SBS One)**; Brilliant Creatures (ABC); Changing Minds (ABC); Coast Australia (The History Channel); The War That Changed Us (ABC)
Most Outstanding News Coverage	Most Outstanding Sports Coverage
**"Lindt Café Siege", Seven News (Seven Network)**; "Moree", NITV News (NITV); "Peter Greste Trial", 7pm News (ABC); "Sydney Siege", Nine News (Nine Network); "What Is Metadata", Sky News (Foxtel)	**2014 FIFA World Cup (SBS One)**; 2014 Emirates Melbourne Cup Carnival (Seven Network); KFC T20 Big Bash League (Network Ten); Supercheap Auto Bathurst 1000 (Seven Network); 2014 Toyota AFL Grand Final (Seven Network)
Most Outstanding Public Affairs Report
**"Banking Bad", Four Corners (ABC)**; "Ian Thorpe – The Parkinson Interview", Ian Thorpe – The Parkinson Interview (Network Ten); "Ice Towns", The Feed (SBS Two); "Joining the Fight", Insight (SBS One); "Searching for C11", Australian Story (ABC)

== Performers ==
- Ricky Martin – "Mr. Put It Down"
- Meghan Trainor – "All About That Bass" / "Lips Are Movin" and "Dear Future Husband"
- The Script

== Presenters ==
- Dave Hughes
- Amanda Keller and Eddie Perfect
- Delta Goodrem
- Peter Helliar and Denise Scott
- Melanie Vallejo and Daniel Wyllie
- Shane Jacobson
- Chris Brown and Jennifer Hawkins
- Julia Morris
- Justine Clarke and Gary Sweet
- Hamish Blake and Andy Lee
- Gracie Gilbert and Jonathan LaPaglia
- Mick Molloy
- Waleed Aly and Sylvia Jeffreys
- Richard Roxburgh
- Dannii Minogue
- Sonia Kruger and Danny O'Donoghue
- Lachy Hulme
- Kerri-Anne Kennerley, Delta Goodrem and Kate Ritchie

== Most nominations ==
By network

- ABC – 32
- Nine Network – 25
- Seven Network – 20
- Network Ten – 19
- Foxtel – 9
- SBS – 8

By program

- Love Child (Nine Network) – 7
- INXS: Never Tear Us Apart (Seven Network) – 6
- Hamish & Andy's Gap Year South America (Nine Network) / Home and Away (Seven Network) – 4
- ANZAC Girls (ABC) / Carlotta (ABC) / Offspring (Network Ten) / The Project (Network Ten) / Wentworth (SoHo) – 3

== In Memoriam ==
The In Memoriam segment was introduced by Michael Slater who spoke of the passing of Richie Benaud. Harpist Alana Conway performed a cover version of Eva Cassidy's "Songbird". The following deceased were honoured:

- Terry Gill, actor
- Norman Yemm, actor
- Elaine Lee, actress
- Jeff Truman, screenwriter, actor
- Michael Shephard, publicist
- |Mark Byrne, agent
- Thea Cavan, TCN receptionist
- Leigh Spence, director
- Mike Dorsey, actor
- Coralie Condon OAM, entertainer
- Michael McCarthy, host
- Barry Donnelly, actor
- Caterina De Nave, commissioning editor
- Allison Rowe, founding director, Screenrights
- Garry Jones, executive
- Geoff Stone, host
- Ian Ross, news presenter
- Harry Potter, journalist
- Brian Cahill, news presenter
- Tony Dickinson, news presenter
- Ian Cook, news director
- Robert Clark, Head of Children's News
- Murray Travis, journalist
- Barry McQueen, newsreader
- Stella Young, writer, activist
- James Walker, screenwriter
- Ted Roberts, screenwriter, producer
- Jan Gash, make up artist
- Paul Ramsay, founder and chair, Prime Media
- Jerome Ehlers, actor
- Sarah Kemp, actress
- John Walton, actor
- Bill Kerr, actor
- Peter Curtin, actor
- Stephanie Quinlan, presenter
- Gavin Jones, executive producer
- Les Wasley BEM, camera operator
- Max Cleary, camera operator
- Joe Murray, director, producer
- Niki Wilton, floor manager
- Betty Lucas, actress
- Max Morrison, staging manager
- Pete Michell, presenter
- Stephen Phillips, journalist
- Stuart Wagstaff, entertainer
