= Richard Lowenstein =

Australian film director, producer, writer

- Born: 1 March 1959 (age 66); Melbourne, Victoria, Australia
- Occupations: Film-maker; music videographer; writer; producer; director
- Known for: Strikebound, Dogs in Space, He Died with a Felafel in His Hand, Australian Made: The Movie, U2: LoveTown
- Parent(s): Werner Lowenstein; Wendy Lowenstein

Richard Lowenstein (born 1 March 1959) is an Australian filmmaker. He has written, produced and directed feature films such as Strikebound (1984), Dogs in Space (1986) and He Died with a Felafel in His Hand (2001); music videos for bands such as INXS and U2; concert performance films, Australian Made: The Movie (1987) and U2: LoveTown (1989); TV adverts, and the documentaries We're Livin' on Dog Food (2009), Autoluminescent (2011), Ecco Homo (2015) and Mystify: Michael Hutchence (2019).

== Biography ==
Richard Lowenstein was born on 1 March 1959 in Melbourne. His mother was the author, oral historian, and activist, Wendy Lowenstein (née Katherin Wendy Robertson, 1927–2006). His father is Werner Lowenstein, also an activist, who had fled Nazi Germany to United Kingdom and was relocated to Australia in 1940 as one of the Dunera boys. The couple married in July 1947; and had three children, Peter, Martie and Richard. Lowenstein attended Brinsley Road Community School from 1973 to 1974; and graduated from Swinburne Institute of Technology, Film and Television Department in 1979.

His short film, Evictions (1979), which won the Erwin Rado Prize – for Best Short Film – at the Melbourne International Film Festival the following year, described Melbourne during the Great Depression. It was based on his mother's book, Weevils in the Flour (1978). The film detailed police evicting unemployed unionists. In 1980 Lowenstein directed a music video, "Leap for Lunch", for the debut single by art punk band, The Ears – he shared a house with their lead singer, Sam Sejavka. In 1982 he directed one for "Talking to a Stranger", a single by rock band, Hunters & Collectors. He followed with "Lumps of Lead" for the same group and "Fraction Too Much Friction" for Tim Finn as his first solo single in 1983. At the Countdown Music and Video Awards for 1983, he won Best Promotional Video for "Fraction Too Much Friction".

In 1984 he directed his first feature film, Strikebound, a dramatisation of a 1930s coal miners strike, which he wrote based on his mother's book, Dead Men Don't Dig Coal (unpublished), and his own research into unionism in the industry. In June that year he directed his first music videos for INXS with "Burn for You", and followed by "All the Voices" and "Dancing on the Jetty" (both in October). At the Countdown Music and Video Awards for 1984 he won Best Promotional Video for "Burn for You". He established a long term relationship with INXS and produced, edited or directed more of their music videos over subsequent years, including The Swing & Other Stories: Collection of Contemporary Classics from INXS (1985), a VHS-format video compilation with additional interviews and documentary. At the Countdown Music and Video Awards for 1985 he shared the award for Best Video for "What You Need" by INXS with Lyn-Marie Milbourn.

In 1985 he directed White City: The Music Movie, a 60-minute video, for former The Who guitarist, Pete Townshend. Geoffrey Giuliano in his book, Behind Blues Eyes: The Life of Pete Townshend (2002), described "[T]he highlight of the video is the poolside staging of the electric 'Face the Face', in which director Richard Lowenstein effectively captures the excitement of a big-band performance and Townshend's joyous jitterbugging ... in a gold lamé, forties-style tuxedo Lowenstein reveals more story line in these five minutes than the entire video". It was released with Townshend's concept album, White City: A Novel, and included him discussing the music.

In 1986 he wrote and directed a feature film, Dogs in Space, which highlighted late-1970s Melbourne's little band scene with the lead character Sam (portrayed by INXS' lead singer, Michael Hutchence) based on Lowenstein's experiences with The Ear's Sejavka. At the time, Sejavka was a member of new wave band, Beargarden, and objected to Lowenstein and Hutchence's "noxious caricature" of his earlier personality. In 2009 SBS TV's Peter Galvin described the movie as a "cult classic" and "for its fans there's never really been anything quite like [it], before or since". Lowenstein recalled the "punk scene was an embarrassment to the Australian music industry back then. In a similar way, Dogs in Space was a total embarrassment to the Australian film industry because it preferred and knew how to handle innocuous candy-coated fare, like The Man from Snowy River".

For Irish group, U2, he has provided music videos – "Desire" and "Angel of Harlem" (both 1988) and a concert performance film, U2: LoveTown (1989). In 1991 he applied for funding from Film Finance Corporation Australia to adapt Robin Klein's novel, Came Back to Show You I Could Fly, into the children's film, Say a Little Prayer, which he directed in 1993. In 1999 he contributed a chapter, "Telexes in Space: A Tale of Two Films", to the collection, Second Take: Australian Film-makers Talk, edited by Geoff Burton and Raffaele Caputo, which provides an explanation of his film-making style. Lowenstein co-produced the satirical music series John Safran's Music Jamboree (2002) as well as John Safran vs God (2004) for SBS independent.

The dumbing down of the art of filmmaking to merely that of efficient "storytelling" surely has to be one of the most depressing things about the current state of mainstream cinema. ... Yet, this seems to be the main expectation that we as a society have of cinema. The history of the artform has proved that it is much more than that, yet when it comes to cinema language, history seems to be going backwards...

— Richard Lowenstein, quoted in Bill Mousoulis' Melbourne Independent Filmmakers, June 2004.

He is a partner in the Melbourne-based production company, Ghost Pictures. He is also a partner in the feature film production company, Fandango Australia Pty Ltd, along with Italian producer – Domenico Procacci, producer – Sue Murray, lawyer – Bryce Menzies and director – Rolf de Heer. He filmed the 2006 U2 concert at Melbourne's Telstra Dome. In October 2009 Lowenstein was guest programmer on Australian Broadcasting Corporation's TV music video show, rage.

== Filmography ==
- Evictions (1979)
- Strikebound (1984)
- White City: The Music Movie (1985)
- INXS: The Swing and Other Stories (music video compilation, 1985)
- Dogs in Space (1986)
- Australian Made: The Movie (concert performance, 1987)
- INXS: Kick: The Video Flick (music video compilation, 1988)
- U2: LoveTown (concert performance, 1989)
- Say a Little Prayer (1993)
- Naked: Stories of Men – Ghost Story (telemovie, 1996)
- He Died with a Felafel in His Hand (2001)
- U2: The Best of 1980–1990 (music video compilation, 2002)
- I'm Only Looking – The Best of INXS (music video compilation, 2004)
- INXS: Welcome to Wherever You Are (documentary film/concert performance included in the DVD I'm Only Looking – The Best of INXS, 2004)
- We're Livin' on Dog Food (documentary film included in the DVD re-release of Dogs in Space, 2009)
- Autoluminescent (documentary film on the life of Rowland S. Howard)
- Producer – In Bob We Trust (documentary film about Father Bob Maguire, directed by Lynn-Maree Milburn, 2013)
- Ecco Homo (documentary film on the life of Peter Vanessa "Troy" Davies, 2015)
- Mystify: Michael Hutchence (a documentary film on the life of Michael Hutchence, lead singer and lyricist of rock band INXS, 2019)

== Music videos ==
- The Ears – "Leap for Lunch" (1980)
- Hunters & Collectors – "Talking to a Stranger" (1982), "Lumps of Lead" (1982)
- The Church – "It's no Reason" (1983)
- Tim Finn – "Fraction Too Much Friction" (1983), "Staring at the Embers" (1983), "Through the Years" (1983)
- Jo Jo Zep & The Falcons – "Taxi Mary" (1984)
- Jules Taylor – "Rock Daddy" (1984)
- Cold Chisel – "Saturday Night" (1984)
- INXS – "Burn for You" (1984), "All the Voices" (1984), "Dancing on the Jetty", (1984), "What You Need" (1985) "Listen Like Thieves" (1986), "Need You Tonight"/"Mediate" (1987), "Never Tear Us Apart" (1988), "New Sensation" (1988), "Guns in the Sky" (1988), "Suicide Blonde" (1990), "By My Side" (1991), "Bitter Tears" (1991), "Heaven Sent" (1992), "Taste It" (1992), "The Gift" (1993), "Cut Your Roses Down" (1993)
- Models – "Barbados" (1985)
- Pete Townshend – "Face the Face" (1985), "Secondhand Love" (1985), "Give Blood" (1985)
- Big Pig – "Hungry Town" (1986) "Boy Wonder" (1988)
- Crowded House – "Mean to Me" (1986), "Into Temptation" (1988)
- Michael Hutchence – "Rooms for the Memory" (1987)
- U2 – "Desire" (1988), "Angel of Harlem" (1988)
- Max Q – "Way of the World" (1989), "Sometimes" (1990)
- Jenny Morris – "Saved Me" (1989)

== Awards and nominations ==
=== Erwin Rado Prize ===
- 1980 Erwin Rado Prize, Melbourne International Film Festival, for short film, Evictions

=== Countdown Australian Music Awards ===
Countdown was an Australian pop music TV series on national broadcaster ABC-TV from 1974–1987, it presented music awards from 1979–1987, initially in conjunction with magazine TV Week. The TV Week / Countdown Awards were a combination of popular-voted and peer-voted awards.

Year	Nominee / work	Award	Result	Ref.
1983	Tim Finn - "Fraction Too Much Friction"	Best Video	Won	
1984	INXS - "Burn for You"	Best Video	Won	
1985	INXS - "What You Need" (with Lyn-Marie Milbourn)	Best Video	Won	

=== MTV Video Music Awards ===
Year	Nominee / work	Award	Result	Ref.
1988	INXS — "Need You Tonight/Mediate"	Best Editing in a Video	Won	

=== ARIA Music Awards ===
The ARIA Music Awards is an annual awards ceremony that recognises excellence, innovation, and achievement across all genres of Australian music. They commenced in 1987.

Year	Nominee / work	Award	Result	Ref.
1989	INXS - "Never Tear Us Apart"	Best Video	Won	
1994	INXS - "The Gift"	Best Video	Won	
