= I Send a Message =

Single by INXS

from the album The Swing
- B-side: "Mechanical"
- Released: 1984
- Recorded: 1983
- Length: 3:24 (album version); 3:20 (single edit); 5:02 (12" extended version)
- Label: WEA
- Songwriters: Michael Hutchence, Andrew Farriss
- Producer: Nick Launay

INXS singles chronology
"Original Sin" (1983)	"I Send a Message" (1984)	"Burn for You" (1984)

"I Send a Message" was the second single released by Australian rock band INXS from their fourth album The Swing. The music video was directed by Yamamoto San and filmed in Tokyo at the city's oldest Buddhist temple in Main Old City Park.

Cash Box called the song "a powerful dance cut" with a "frenetic back beat" and "staccato vocal."

At the 1984 Countdown Music Awards, the song was nominated for Best Australian Single.

== Track listing ==
7" single Track listing

No.	Title	Writer(s)	Length
1.	"I Send a Message"	M. Hutchence, A. Farriss	4:46
2.	"Mechanical"	A. Farris	4:39

12"/CD Maxi single Track listing

No.	Title	Writer(s)	Length
1.	"I Send a Message" (Extended remix)	M. Hutchence, A. Farriss	5:02
2.	"Burn for You" (Remix)	M. Hutchence, A. Farriss	4:26
3.	"Johnson's Aeroplane" (Remix)	A. Farris	3:54

== Charts ==
The song was released on 12 March 1984 and reached No.3 on the Kent Music Report. It also reached No.18 on the New Zealand Singles charts, No. 18 on the US Billboard Dance Music/Club Play Singles and No. 77 on The Billboard Hot 100.

=== Weekly charts ===
Weekly chart performance for "I Send a Message"
Chart (1984)	Peak position
Australia (Kent Music Report)	3
Netherlands (Single Tip)	*
New Zealand (Recorded Music NZ)	18
US Billboard Hot 100	77
US Dance Club Songs (Billboard)	18
"*" indicates an unranked position.

=== Year-end charts ===
1984 year-end chart performance for "I Send a Message"
Chart (1984)	Position
Australia (Kent Music Report)	45
New Zealand (Recorded Music NZ)	47
