= Burn for You (INXS song) =

1984 single by INXS

Single by INXS

from the album The Swing
- B-side: "Johnson's Aeroplane"
- Released: 26 July 1984
- Recorded: 1983
- Length: 4:59 (album version); 4:26 (single edit); 6:09 (12" extended version)
- Label: WEA
- Songwriters: Michael Hutchence, Andrew Farriss
- Producer: Nick Launay

INXS singles chronology
"I Send a Message" (1984)	"Burn for You" (1984)	"Dancing on the Jetty" (1984)

"Burn for You" is a song by Australian rock band INXS that features on the band's fourth album The Swing. It was the third single to be released from the album and peaked at #3 on the Australian chart in August 1984, remaining there for two weeks. Jenny Morris (New Zealand born) and Sherine Abeyratne provided backing vocals for the song.

== Track listing ==
7" single Track listing

No.	Title	Writer(s)	Length
1.	"Burn for You"	M. Hutchence, A. Farriss	4:46
2.	"Johnson's Aeroplane"	A. Farris	4:39

12"/CD Maxi single Track listing

No.	Title	Writer(s)	Length
1.	"Burn for You" (Extended remix)	M. Hutchence, A. Farriss	6:09
2.	"Burn for You" (Remix)	M. Hutchence, A. Farriss	3:38
3.	"I Send a Message" (Extended remix)	M. Hutchence, A. Farriss	4:46

== Music video ==
The video was filmed by Richard Lowenstein, over a week of the band while on tour in the style of a home movie, in Mackay in North Queensland. Hutchence asked Lowenstein to come to Queensland to direct after seeing his work on the video for the Hunters & Collectors single "Talking to a Stranger". It was the first of fifteen videos that Lowenstein directed for the band. The video won Best Promotional Video at the 1984 Countdown Music and Video Awards, while the band won Best Group Performance in a Video.

== Charts ==
=== Weekly charts ===
Chart (1984)	Peak position
Australia (Kent Music Report)	3
New Zealand (Recorded Music NZ)	29

=== Year-end charts ===
Chart (1984)	Position
Australia (Kent Music Report)	25
