= Ecce Homo, Alcamo =

Church building in Alcamo, Italy

Ecce Homo
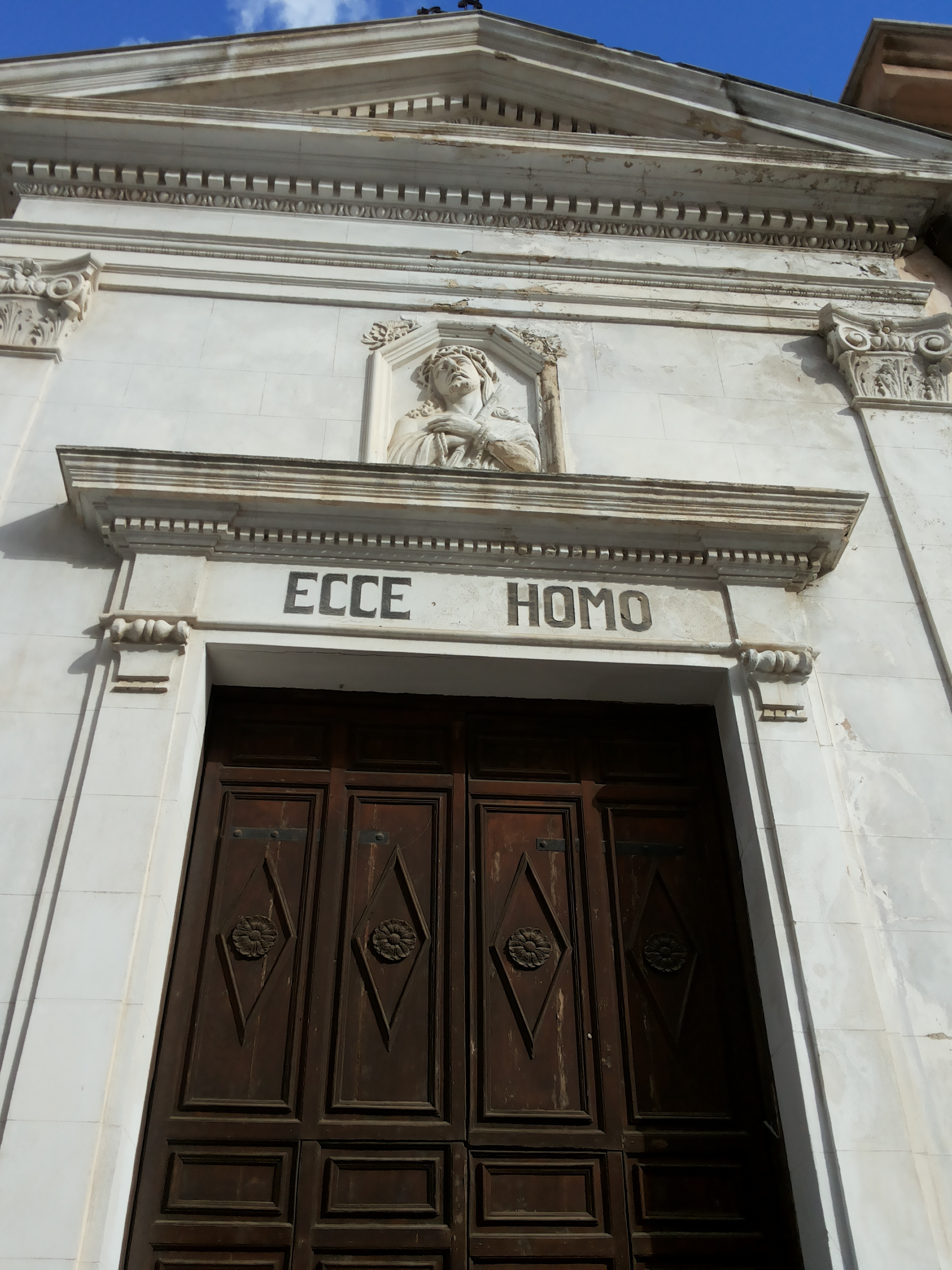
- The façade

Religion
- Affiliation: Catholic
- Province: Trapani
- Region: Sicily
- Rite: Catholic
- Patron: Ecce Homo
- Year consecrated: 1754

Location
- Location: Alcamo, province of Trapani, Italy
- Municipality: Alcamo
- State: Italy
- Interactive map of Ecce Homo
- Territory: Alcamo
- Coordinates: 37°58′51″N 12°57′53″E

Architecture
- Groundbreaking: 1753

Ecce Homo was a Catholic Church in Alcamo, in the province of Trapani, Sicily. It was built in 1753 and used by the Congregation of the Most Holy Ecce Homo until 1968, when it was damaged by an earthquake. Extensively restored in 1992, it is now a multi-use venue space. Ecco Homo refers to the suffering of Jesus Christ, as depicted in many religious artworks. A church of the same name stands in Old Jerusalem, commemorating the spot where Pontius Pilate is supposed to have uttered the words.

== History ==
The present Church was built in 1753 on the same spot where there was a chapel called the Crocifissello (small Crucifix), close to the western town walls. As it was very small, the members of the Congregation asked the municipality for the authorization to have the chapel's courtyard to build a larger Church there.

The construction started in 1753 and was completed the following year; the building was closed to service because of the 1968 Belice earthquake. In 1986, the Monuments and Fine Arts Department of Trapani decided on the first restoration work including the consolidation of the Church, the vault and the roof.

Later, in 1992 the Department completed the works by repairing the stuccoes, replacing the frames the gilt work, and repainted the Church.

Today the Church of the Most Holy Ecce Homo is no longer a temple but a monument rescued from decay. It is now used as an auditorium and as a meeting place for cultural events.

== Description and works ==
The church has a simple portal, surmounted by a niche where you can see a marble alto-rilievo panel representing Ecce homo.

There is one circular nave, similar to that one in the Saints Cosma and Damiano's Church, with beautiful Settecento stucco decorations on the vault; it has an hemispheric shape, with four webs surmounting the windows ending on masonry pillars.

Inside the webs there are represented the prophecy of the Passion, the Flagellation, the Calvary and the Risen's Cross; in the middle of the vault there are the Holy Ghost, as a dove, and the Bible.

There are three altars and these works:

- Ecce Homo, a wooden statue on the high altar
- A wooden Crucifix, on the left altar
- Saint Francis of Paola: a recent statue on the right altar
- Organ with its choir, settled above the entrance opposite the high altar.

== The Congregation ==
The Congregation of the Most Holy Ecce Homo, founded at about 1750 by canonico Don Vincenzo Fiderico, Chapelain of the Hospital Santo Spirito e San Vito and its first Rector, was formed by butchers and other merchants, who, owing to their working hours, were used to meet on Friday night in this Church for their spiritual meetings.

After having been hosted in other churches, in 1753 the bishop of Mazara del Vallo, after some pressing requests made by Congregation, gave them the Church of the Crocifissello, in the district of Chiesa Madre and adjoining a courtyard limited by the old town walls and some houses.

The main scopes were these:

- To promote the greater glory of God the Father and of the Holy Church, the sinners’ conversion and the end of blasfemies.
- To devote oneself to spiritual works and to the Most Holy Ecce Homo
- To take action for the reform of one's habits, by giving other people the good example of Christian life and maintaining the spirit of charity towards everybody, because this is the bond which connects us to God.

These people were excluded:

- All women
- Noblemen or teachers or dignitaries of any kind
- Immoral, irreligious and ed heretical people
- The people condemned for public or private crimes or guilty of illegal purchase of Church property
- Dissolute or scandalous people, such as concubines, adulterers, blasphemers, violators of festivities.

The feast was celebrated on the first Friday of March and it was preceded by a week of spiritual exercises and followed by the Forty Hours Devotion. During the rites and processions, the members of the congregation wore a cloth scapular with two violet ribbons at their ends: one side, with the image of Ecce Homo, was hanging on their chest, and the other, behind their shoulders, had the embroidery of a crown made by thorns and three nails inside it.

The Congregation existed until 1968, when the Belice Earthquake damaged its structure remarkably and the Church was unfit for use.

== See also ==
- Catholic Church in Italy

== Sources ==
- Carlo Cataldo: Guida storico-artistica dei beni culturali di Alcamo-Calatafimi-Castellammare Golfo p. 62; ed. Sarograf, Alcamo,1982
- Carlo Cataldo: La conchiglia di S.Giacomo p. 89–90; ed. Campo, Alcamo, 2001
