= In Bob We Trust =

- DVD cover
- In Bob We Trust
- Directed by: Lynn-Maree Milburn
- Written by: Lynn-Maree Milburn
- Produced by: Richard Lowenstein, Maya Gnyp, Andrew de Groot, Lynn-Maree Milburn
- Starring: Bob Maguire, John Safran
- Cinematography: Andrew de Groot
- Edited by: Lynn-Maree Milburn, Richard Lowenstein, Andrew de Groot, Lora-Mae Adrao
- Production company: Ghost Pictures
- Distributed by: Apparition Entertainment
- Release date: October 2013 (Australia)
- Running time: 102 minutes
- Country: Australia
- Language: English

In Bob We Trust is a 2013 feature documentary about Father Bob Maguire directed by Lynn-Maree Milburn and produced by Ghost Pictures Pty Ltd.

== Story ==
A documentary about Father Bob Maguire, a renegade Catholic Priest from Melbourne, Victoria. The documentary traces Maguire as he is forced to retire from his parish of 38 years, Sts Peter and Paul Parish in South Melbourne. The film begins in 2009 when the Archbishop of Melbourne, Archbishop Denis Hart, "invites" Fr. Bob to retire.

== Crowdfunding campaign ==
In Bob We Trust was initially funded via the crowdfunding website Pozible, raising more than $30,000.
