= Schapelle (film) =

- DVD cover
- Directed by: Khoa Do
- Screenplay by: Katherine Thomson
- Produced by: Stephen Corvini
- Starring: Krew Boylan; Jacinta Stapleton; Denise Roberts; Colin Friels
- Cinematography: Peter A.Holland ACS
- Edited by: Rodrigo Balart
- Music by: Matteo Zingales
- Production company: Fremantle Media Australia
- Distributed by: FremantleMedia International
- Release date: 9 February 2014
- Running time: 95 mins
- Country: Australia
- Language: English

Schapelle is an Australian television film that aired in Australia on Nine Network on 9 February 2014 and in New Zealand on TV One on 20 February 2014. It was produced by Stephen Corvini Fremantle Media Australia, written by playwright Katherine Thomson and directed by Khoa Do, and is based on the true story of Schapelle Corby. It is based on the book Sins of the Father: The untold story behind Schapelle Corby's ill-fated drug run by Eamonn Duff. This source was later to be discredited via a series of legal actions. In the first case the judge awarded $50,000 damages for breach of copyright in the unauthorised use of family photographs. Defamation cases followed, and in October 2015 family members settled for an undisclosed amount.

== Plot ==
Australian Schapelle Corby is arrested at Bali airport for possession of 4 kg of marijuana.

== Cast ==
- Krew Boylan as Schapelle Corby
- Denise Roberts as Rosleigh Rose
- Jacinta Stapleton as Mercedes Corby
- Colin Friels as Mick Corby
- Vince Colosimo as Corby's lawyer
- Russell Kiefel as Malcolm McCauley
- Peter Harvey as himself (TV footage)
- Karl Stefanovic as himself (TV footage)
- Mike Munro as himself (TV footage)

== Production ==
Filming of Schapelle took place throughout the second half of 2013, with scenes depicting Kerobokan Prison, the Indonesian High Court and many others filmed on the Gold Coast, Queensland. The production was initially given the working title of Doc McGee.

Schapelle was originally going to premiere on Monday 10 February, at 8:30pm, but due to the ongoing events involving the real life Schapelle Corby, it was aired on the preceding Sunday instead, going head to head with the Seven Network's INXS: Never Tear Us Apart. The film was watched by a national audience of 1.02 million, however, the Seven offering aired at the same time achieved a higher audience of 1.97 million. It was repeated the following night, the day on which it was originally going to air. The final consolidated audience for Schapelle was 1.96 million. The telemovie was replayed on Sunday 28 May 2017, the day Schapelle Corby was due home from Australia following the completion of her jail sentence for drug trafficking.

In New Zealand Schapelle screened the same night as news headlines (on same network) read "New Zealander, Leeza Tracey Ormsby, 37, may face death for drug importation" and compared the case to Schapelle's.

== Awards and nominations ==
Award	Category	Subject	Result
AACTA Award (4th)	Best Guest or Supporting Actress in a Television Drama	Denise Roberts	Nominated
Logie Awards (57th)	Most Outstanding Actress	Denise Roberts	Nominated

== See also ==
- Bali Nine
