= What You Need (INXS song) =

1985 single by INXS

- Cover art for US and UK editions, also used for the worldwide 12-inch vinyl Extended Mix maxi-single

Single by INXS

from the album Listen Like Thieves
- B-side: "Sweet as Sin"
- Released: 26 August 1985 (AUS); 1986 (US)
- Recorded: 1985
- Genre: Pop rock; funk rock
- Length: 3:35
- Label: Atlantic
- Songwriters: Andrew Farriss; Michael Hutchence; Jon Farriss
- Producer: Chris Thomas

INXS singles chronology
| "Dancing on the Jetty" (1984) | "What You Need" (1985) | "This Time" (1985) |

"What You Need" is a song recorded by the Australian band INXS, from their 1985 album Listen Like Thieves. "What You Need" was the lead single off the album in Australia and New Zealand, while in the US and Europe it was the second single after "This Time". "What You Need" was the band's first American Top Ten hit, peaking at number 5 on the Billboard Hot 100 singles chart.

After the album Listen Like Thieves was recorded and ready to be given to the record label for inspection, producer Chris Thomas was worried that the album didn't have a "hit". As Andrew Farriss recalled in a 2005 interview; "'What You Need' is another example of a huge hit that essentially took no time at all. We'd already finished the Listen Like Thieves album but Chris Thomas (the producer) told us there was still no 'hit'. We left the studio that night knowing we had one day left and we had to deliver 'a hit'. Talk about pressure. The band's performance on that track is amazing. We absolutely nailed it."

A remixed version of "What You Need" was featured on the soundtrack of the sports video game FIFA Football 2005.

== Music video ==
The music video for the song was created using an animation technique known as rotoscope. At the Countdown Music and Video Awards for 1985, the award for Best Video for "What You Need" by INXS was shared by Richard Lowenstein and Lynn-Maree Milburn.

== Track listing ==
UK 7-inch INXS 12

1. "What You Need" – 3:35
2. "Sweet As Sin" – 2:20

UK 12-inch single INXS 512

1. "What You Need" (Remix) – 5:35 (Remix: Nick Launay)
2. "Sweet As Sin" – 2:21
3. "What You Need" (Live) – 3:56
4. "The One Thing" (Live) – 3:31

== Chart performance ==
=== Weekly charts ===
| Chart (1985–1986) | Peak position |
|---|---|
| Australia (Kent Music Report) | 2 |
| Canada Top Singles (RPM) | 21 |
| Canada (The Record) | 23 |
| New Zealand (Recorded Music NZ) | 14 |
| UK Singles Chart | 51 |
| US Billboard Hot 100 | 5 |
| US Billboard Mainstream Rock Tracks | 3 |
| US Cash Box Top 100 | 4 |

=== Year-end charts ===
| Chart (1986) | Position |
|---|---|
| Australia (Kent Music Report) | 18 |
| US Billboard Hot 100 | 56 |
| US Cash Box Top 100 | 27 |
