= Jacinta Stapleton =

Australian actress (born 1979)

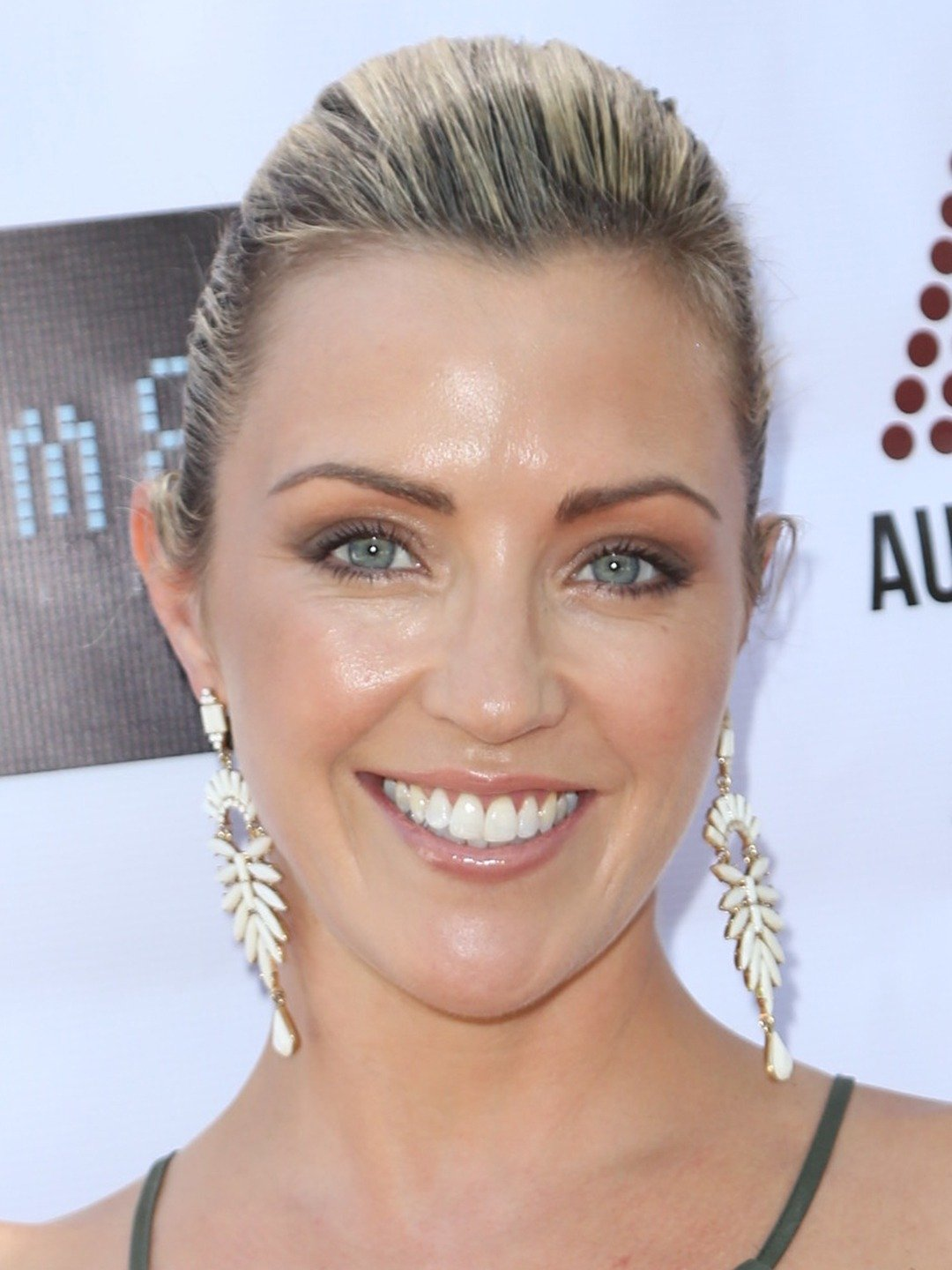
- Stapleton in 2020
- Born: Jacinta Patrice Stapleton; 6 June 1979 (age 47); Malvern, Victoria, Australia
- Occupation: Actress
- Years active: 1988–present
- Relatives: Sullivan Stapleton (brother)

Jacinta Patrice Stapleton (born 6 June 1979) is an Australian actress. Best known for her role as Amy Greenwood in the Australian television soap opera Neighbours from 1997–2000, 2005 and 2020–2023). Her most notable role was playing undercover police officer Christina Dichiera in the primetime crime drama television series Stingers. Her performance garnered an Australian Film Institute nomination for Best Supporting Actress in a Television Drama. She is the sister of Blindspot actor Sullivan Stapleton.

== Early life ==
Stapleton was born in Malvern, Victoria. Her brother Sullivan Stapleton is also an actor. They both joined an acting agency from a young age. When she was six years old, Stapleton made her first television appearance in a commercial. She appeared in almost 60 commercials and did some modelling work. Stapleton studied drama, theatre and dance at Sandringham Secondary College.

== Career ==
Stapleton's starred in the 1988 film Boulevard of Broken Dreams when she was eight years old. She then guested in various television series, including The Flying Doctors and Col'n Carpenter. She played Sophie in the children's series The Genie From Down Under. From 1997 until 2000, Stapleton played the role of Amy Greenwood in the television soap opera Neighbours. She made a cameo in 2005 during the 20th anniversary episode. In November 2020, it was announced that Stapleton would be reprising the role of Amy for a guest stint.

In October 1999, she posed nude for Black+White magazine.

From 2002 to 2004, she played Christina Dichiera in the TV drama Stingers, Stapleton was not told that the character was bisexual at her audition, as the producers thought her sexual orientation should not overshadow her and her job as an undercover police officer. She was nominated for an Australian Film Institute award for Best Supporting Actress in a Television Drama. She also appeared in the 2002 feature film Dalkeith. Stapleton went onto appear in Last Man Standing, Blue Heelers, All Saints, Out of the Blue, and Packed to the Rafters.

In 2006, Stapleton relocated to Los Angeles for work and she appeared in the miniseries Nightmares & Dreamscapes: From the Stories of Stephen King. Stapleton has played Reen Nalli in the INXS: Never Tear Us Apart biopic and Mercedes Corby in the story of Schapelle. She also played Madonna in the Molly Meldrum biopic Molly. She won an award for her role as Bambi Steele in the film Musclecar.

== Film ==
Year	Title	Role	Notes
1988	Boulevard of Broken Dreams	Jessie Garfield	
2002	Dalkeith	Kate Johnson	
2005	The Drop	Leighla	Short
2006	Get Lucky	Jasmine	Short
2010	Matching Jack	Madeline	
2010	Santa's Apprentice	Felix's Mother	Voice
2015	Sucker	Alice	
2016	All Cock and No Bull!	Raina	Short
2017	Musclecar	Bambi Steele	Feature
2018	Paint It Red	Hanika	
2018	And the Winner Is	Anja	Short, completed
2018	The Dunes	Misty	Post-production
2019	Blood Vessel	Shelly	

== Television ==
Year	Title	Role	Notes
1989–90	The Flying Doctors	Cindy / Heather McTaggart	Episodes: "Next to Go", "Wilderness"
1991	Rose Against the Odds	Jenny (young)	TV film
1993	Neighbours	Vikki	Guest role (3 episodes)
1996–1998	The Genie from Down Under	Sophie Mills	Recurring role
1997–2000, 2005, 2020–2023	Neighbours	Amy Greenwood	Regular role (443 episodes)
2000	The Lost World	Thea	Episode: "Amazons"
2001	Stingers	Kristen Rodgers	Episode: "Psychotic Episode"
2002	BeastMaster	Ilira	Episode: "Sisters"
2002–2004	Stingers	Christina Dicheria	Main role (series 6–8)
2005	MDA	Chloe Davis	Episodes: "A Human Cost: Parts 1–4"
2005	Last Man Standing	Syl	Episodes: "1.14", "1.16", "1.17"
2006	Blue Heelers	Tilda Dean	Episodes: "Affluenza", "Going Down Swinging"
2006	Nightmares & Dreamscapes: From the Stories of Stephen King	Cece Pryor	Episode: "You Know They Got a Hell of a Band"
2006–07	All Saints	Jo Henderson	Recurring role (series 9–10)
2008	Valentine's Day	Delvene	TV film
2008	Out of the Blue	Tamara	Recurring role
2009	Dirt Game	Chloe	Episode: "Boab Dreaming"
2010	Cops L.A.C.	Kate Nolan	Episode: "A Veil of Tears"
2010	Dive Olly Dive!	Dr. Katz (voice)	TV series
2011	The Davincibles	Cherie (voice)	TV series
2013	Packed to the Rafters	Carla	Episodes: "Reality Checks", "Role Reversals", "Head vs. Heart"
2014	Schapelle	Mercedes Corby	TV film
2014	INXS: Never Tear Us Apart	Reen Nalli	TV miniseries
2016	Molly	Madonna	Episode: "1.2"
2018	Bite Club	Marie Connors	Episode: "1.2"
