= Wendy Lowenstein =

Australian historian and author

Wendy Lowenstein (born Katherin Wendy Robertson; 25 June 1927 — 16 October 2006) was an Australian historian, author, and teacher. She pioneered oral history in Australia, and became known after her 1978 work, Weevils in the Flour, became a bestseller. She began collecting folklore and oral histories of early Australian working life in the 1960s. She is notable for her recording of people's everyday experiences and her social activism.

== Early life and education ==
Wendy Lowenstein was born Katherin Wendy Robertson on 25 June 1927, the daughter of Douglas and Rita Robertson.

In 1939 she won a scholarship to study at Box Hill Grammar School, and went to her first political meeting that year. Aged 15, she joined her sister Shirley and brother John in the Eureka Youth League (the youth wing of the Communist Party of Australia), as well as the New Theatre in Melbourne, a radical theatre group.

== Career ==
Lowenstein worked as a primary school teacher in the 1960s, and was also a singer of folk music. She later worked different roles, including as high school teacher, teacher-librarian, proofreader, print and radio journalist, folklore collector, writer, oral historian, and a public speaker on working life and self-publishing.

Lowenstein published Weevils in the Flour in 1978, and started writing another book, Dead Men Don't Dig Coal, which was never completed. Her son, filmmaker Richard Lowenstein, used interviews from Weevils in the Flour, but the title of the unpublished manuscript was used in the film credits.

== Other activities ==
Lowenstein was a social activist most of her life. In 1955, she co-founded the Folk Lore Society of Victoria with Ian Turner and she contributed to and edited the Folk Lore Society of Victoria's magazine Gumsucker's Gazette, later Australian Tradition, for 15 years. Shirley Andrews (chairperson) and Lowenstein worked together on the committee which organised the first festival, held in Melbourne in 1967.

She worked voluntarily for organisations such as People for Nuclear Disarmament. She was also involved in a number of other organisations over the course of her life, including: New Theatre, the Eureka Youth League, the Victorian Folk Music Society, the Australian Folklore Expedition, the Boree Log Folk Club, the Colonial Bush Dance Society, Pram Factory Flea Market, various alternative and community schools and centres, Friends of the Earth Australia, Arts Action For Peace, the Palm Sunday Committee, the Victorian Secondary Teachers Association, and the Oral History Association of Australia.

She was awarded writer-in-residence posts at universities, gave workshops, and was a sought-after public speaker at conferences until around 2002.

== Oral history recordings ==
The Lowenstein Oral History Collection consists of at least 741 hours of interviews recorded between 1969 and 1999. The interviews in the collection cover a diverse range of topics, including the social effects of the 1930s Depression and working life in Australia; children's rhymes; Australian folklore; pearl luggers; the Gurindji strike ("Wave Hill walk-off"); and the Patrick's waterside dispute at Melbourne Docklands in 1998.

=== Topics ===
- Australian outback interviews — 1969 (109 work(s); 126 hours). Recorded during a year-long collecting trip in 1969, many used as material for Weevils in the Flour. Copies are held in the Lowenstein Family Collection (LFC), the National Library of Australia (NLA), the State Library of Victoria and some recordings are also available in libraries in Western Australia and Queensland.
- Australian Folklore and Social History [1968–1972]
- 1930s Depression in Australia
- Melbourne waterside workers: 60 work(s); 60 hours
- Communists and the left in the arts and community: 99 works; 125 hours
- Oral history of childhood: 5 work(s); 9 hours
- Robe River / Peko-Wallsend industrial dispute
- Changes to working life in Australia — 1990s
- Wonthaggi coal-mining interviews

== Personal life, death and legacy ==
Lowenstein was married to Werner, and had three children, including filmmaker Richard Lowenstein, Martie and Peter.

Lowenstein developed Alzheimer's disease and died from complications of the disease on 16 October 2006 at The Alfred Hospital in Melbourne.

She left a large collection of oral history, as well as a large collection of manuscripts, correspondence, and other papers covering the period 1918-2003 (mostly 1953–2000), all held at the NLA in Canberra.

Lowenstein Lane in Canberra is named after her.

== Selected publications ==
=== Based on oral history recordings ===
Lowenstein is chiefly known for her written oral histories, which include The Immigrants 1977, Weevils in the Flour 1978, and Under The Hook (with Tom Hills) 1992. She is less well known for her recordings of Australian folklore and her interviews with people about Australian working life. Her work concentrates on early manual labouring industries such as coal mining, cane cutting, northern cattle station work, waterside workers, and the pearling industry. Lowenstein sought to record the worker's perspective in industrial disputes.

- The Immigrants, by Wendy Lowenstein and Morag Loh, Hyland House, Melbourne, 1977. This book tells the experiences of 17 immigrants in their own words. Foreword by Henry Mayer of the University of Sydney.
- Weevils in the flour: An oral record of the 1930s depression in Australia by Wendy Lowenstein, Hyland House/Scribe 1978, Lowenstein's best-known book. The foreword was written by Manning Clark. Published in 1978, it was an immediate bestseller and was awarded the Royal Blind Society's first Talking Book of the Year in 1980. Russel Ward, reviewing the book in The Age wrote: "This great book on the depression is so good, it is impossible to praise it sufficiently without sounding absurd."
- Under the hook: Melbourne Waterside Workers Remember 1900–1998 by Wendy Lowenstein & Tom Hills Bookworkers Press. An oral history written in the words of the rank and file wharfies. Whilst interviewing for Weevils in the Flour, Lowenstein met veteran Melbourne wharfie Tom Hills. With Hills' collaboration, Under the Hook: Melbourne waterside workers remember 1900–1998, was self-published under her Bookworkers' Press imprint. The first edition covered 1900–1990. A revised and updated 2nd edition included interviews during the Patricks dispute of 1998.
- Weevils at work includes the 80 interviews Lowenstein recorded in Pannawonica and Robe River in 1986–1988 during the Pekoe Wallsend industrial dispute. These recordings give a picture of working life, changes in working conditions, family life, and the community affected by the prolonged dispute in Robe River, Western Australia.

=== Miscellaneous ===
- Shocking Shocking Shocking (n.d.) A self-published collection of improper Australian children's play-rhymes.
- Co-author, Cinderella Dressed in Yella, with Ian Turner and June Factor
- Co-author, Self Publishing Without Pain, with M. Saint-Ferjeux, 1990 (self-published)
- Ron Edwards a short life of folklorist Ron Edwards, (Note: Interviewed by Lowenstein in 1991; audio stored in the oral history collection.) published in Australian Academic and Research Libraries (AARL), March 1992.
