= Listen Like Thieves =

Studio album by INXS
- Released: 14 October 1985
- Recorded: August 1985
- Studios: Rhinoceros Studios (Sydney, Australia); AIR Studios (London, United Kingdom)
- Genres: New wave; pop rock; hard rock; plastic soul
- Length: 37:16
- Labels: WEA; Mercury; Atlantic
- Producer: Chris Thomas

INXS chronology
The Swing (1984)	Listen Like Thieves (1985)	Kick (1987)

Singles from Listen Like Thieves
- 1. "What You Need" Released: August 1985; 2. "This Time" Released: November 1985; 3. "Kiss the Dirt (Falling Down the Mountain)" Released: March 1986; 4. "Listen Like Thieves" Released: June 1986

Listen Like Thieves is the fifth studio album by Australian rock band INXS. It was released on 14 October 1985. It spent two weeks at number one on the Australian Kent Music Report Albums Chart. Considered an international breakthrough album for the band, it peaked at No. 11 on the United States Billboard 200, No. 24 on the Canadian RPM 100 Albums and in the top 50 in the United Kingdom.

The album features the band's first top 5 single in the U.S., "What You Need", and it also won the group the Countdown Music and Video Award for 'Best Video'. Listen Like Thieves also marks the beginning of the group's off-and-on alliance with producer Chris Thomas.

In May 2025, Petrol Records and Universal Music Group issued a 40th Anniversary re-release. Available in multiple formats, including many bonus tracks and live concert recordings from the 1985–86 period. The album has been remixed in Dolby Atmos and remastered by Giles Martin.

== Background ==
Listen Like Thieves is the fifth studio album by INXS. The Sydney-based group had formed in 1977 by the three Fariss brothers: Andrew on guitar and keyboards, Jon on percussion and drums, and Tim on guitar, along with Garry Gary Beers on bass guitar, Michael Hutchence as lead vocalist, and Kirk Pengilly on guitar, saxophone, and vocals. Their previous album, The Swing (April 1984), had local chart success peaking at number one on the Australian Kent Music Report Albums Chart and No. 6 in New Zealand. Although appearing on international charts – No. 52 on United States Billboard 200, and No. 27 on the Canadian RPM 100 Albums – INXS wanted to improve their worldwide impact.

After recording their last album in New York and Oxfordshire, they returned to Sydney where they worked with Chris Thomas (Sex Pistols, Pretenders, Roxy Music, Elton John) producing at Rhinoceros Studios.

== Recording and production ==
Listen Like Thieves was recorded over a three-month period at the Rhinoceros studio in Sydney, NSW, Australia. Many of the album's songs were written by the song writing duo of Hutchence and Andrew Farriss.

As production came close to completion, Thomas told the band that the album was lacking a crucial hit single, so the band members left the studio having just a few days to come up with one last song. "Chris Thomas told us there was still no 'hit'", Farriss later recalled. "We left the studio that night knowing we had one day left and we had to deliver a 'hit'. Talk about pressure." Both Hutchence and Farriss searched through the demos that Farriss had composed throughout the album's production. Out of the remaining demos, Thomas persuaded the duo to focus on one particular demo titled "Funk Song no 13". "It was great. I thought, 'I could listen to that groove for 10 minutes!' I said, 'Let's work with that groove'", said Thomas. INXS spent the next two days working on the demo track, which would eventually turn out to be the hit single "What You Need", giving the band their first top 5 hit in the U.S.

== Critical reception ==
Professional ratings
Review scores
Source	Rating
AllMusic	4/5 stars
MusicHound Rock	4/5
The Palm Beach Post	3/5 stars
Pitchfork	8.0/10
(The New)Rolling Stone Album Guide	3.5/5 stars

AllMusic's Stephen Thomas Erlewine noted that with Listen Like Thieves the band "completes its transition into an excellent rock & roll singles band". However "the new configuration only works for three songs", which were its first three singles, "What You Need", "Listen Like Thieves" and "Kiss the Dirt (Falling Down the Mountain)". Despite this commentary, the music critic stated as well that "the album cannot be dismissed" and gave it four out of five stars in his ranking. Australian musicologist Ian McFarlane opined that Listen Like Thieves had "a much harder sound than heard on previous INXS records, but somehow it lacked the pop smarts that had made The Swing so appealing".

Rolling Stone's Parke Puterbaugh felt the group were "going for the jugular – or is that the groin?" and with Thomas they "forge an unlikely union between the sonic extremism of Led Zeppelin-style crunch rock and the step-lively beat of disco" such that the album "rocks with passion and seals the deal with a backbeat that'll blackmail your feet". Paul Bennett writing for The Times Colonist, said This Aussie group deserves to make the big- time with their latest offering of fast paced, intelligently- written rock. He awarded the album four out of five stars."

In 2024, Uncut placed the album at no. 387 on their list of the 500 greatest albums of the 1980s.

== Track listing ==
All tracks are written by Andrew Farriss and Michael Hutchence, unless otherwise indicated

Side one
No.	Title	Writer(s)	Length
1.	"What You Need"		3:35
2.	"Listen Like Thieves"	Garry Gary Beers; Hutchence; Kirk Pengilly; Tim Farriss; A. Farriss; Jon Farriss (Note: Songwriting credited simply to "INXS" on most releases.)	3:46
3.	"Kiss the Dirt (Falling Down the Mountain)"		3:56
4.	"Shine Like It Does"		3:05
5.	"Good + Bad Times"	Pengilly; Hutchence	2:46

Side two
No.	Title	Writer(s)	Length
6.	"Biting Bullets"	Pengilly; Hutchence	2:49
7.	"This Time"	A. Farriss	3:11
8.	"Three Sisters" (instrumental)	T. Farriss (Note: Songwriting also credited to "INXS" on some releases and to "A. Farriss" on some others.)	2:27
9.	"Same Direction"		4:58
10.	"One x One"		3:05
11.	"Red Red Sun"	J. Farriss; A. Farriss	3:32
Total length:			37:16

=== 2025 re-releases ===
In 2025, Atlantic & Rhino Records released a 2 CD version or Listen Like Thieves with a second disc of B-Sides, remixes & live recordings. Atlantic Catalog Group also release a 3 CD, one LP Super Deluxe Edition of Listen Like Thieves as part of the 40th anniversary reissue campaign.

=== 2 CD ===
All tracks are written by Andrew Farriss & Michael Hutchence, unless otherwise indicated.

Disc one, 2025 Mix By Giles Martin & Paul Hicks
No.	Title	Writer(s)	Length
1.	"What You Need"		3:35
2.	"Listen Like Thieves"	Beers; Hutchence; Pengilly; T. Farriss; A. Farriss; J. Farriss	3:46
3.	"Kiss the Dirt (Falling Down the Mountain)"		3:56
4.	"Shine Like It Does"		3:05
5.	"Good + Bad Times"	Pengilly; Hutchence	2:46
6.	"Biting Bullets"	Pengilly; Hutchence	2:49
7.	"This Time"	A. Farriss	3:11
8.	"Three Sisters" (instrumental)	T. Farriss	2:27
9.	"Same Direction"		4:58
10.	"One x One"		3:05
11.	"Red Red Sun"	J. Farriss; A. Farriss	3:32

Disc two, B-Sides, Remixes & Live Recordings
No.	Title	Writer(s)	Length
1.	"Listen Like Thieves" (Extended Remix)	Beers; Hutchence; Pengilly; T. Farriss; A. Farriss; J. Farriss	5:46
2.	"Begotten"	Pengilly	3:07
3.	"What You Need" (Nick Launay Remix)		5:37
4.	"I'm Over You" (B-side of "This Time")	J. Farriss	4:06
5.	"Sweet As Sin" (B-side of "What You Need")	Beers	2:20
6.	"Six Knots"	Pengilly	0:58
7.	"Listen Like Thieves" (Instrumental Remix)	Beers; Hutchence; Pengilly; T. Farriss; A. Farriss; J. Farriss	4:08
8.	"Same Direction" (Live)		5:17
9.	"Kiss the Dirt (Falling Down the Mountain)" (Live)		4:04
10.	"Biting Bullets" (Live)	Hutchence; Pengilly	2:48
11.	"Shine Like It Does" (Live)		3:26
12.	"Listen Like Thieves" (Live)	Beers; Hutchence; Pengilly; T. Farriss; A. Farriss; J. Farriss	3:52
13.	"One X One" (Live)		2:56
14.	"What You Need" (Live)		4:19
15.	"Red Red Sun" (Live)	J. Farriss; A. Farriss	3:15

=== Super Deluxe Edition ===
All tracks are written by Andrew Farriss & Michael Hutchence, unless otherwise indicated.

Disc one
No.	Title	Writer(s)	Length
1.	"What You Need"		3:35
2.	"Listen Like Thieves"	Beers; Hutchence; Pengilly; T. Farriss; A. Farriss; J. Farriss	3:46
3.	"Kiss the Dirt (Falling Down the Mountain)"		3:56
4.	"Shine Like It Does"		3:05
5.	"Good + Bad Times"	Pengilly; Hutchence	2:46
6.	"Biting Bullets"	Pengilly; Hutchence	2:49
7.	"This Time"	A. Farriss	3:11
8.	"Three Sisters" (instrumental)	T. Farriss	2:27
9.	"Same Direction"		4:58
10.	"One x One"		3:05
11.	"Red Red Sun"	J. Farriss; A. Farriss	3:32

Disc two
No.	Title	Writer(s)	Length
1.	"We're Rolling, It's 1985" (Studio Dialogue)		0:12
2.	"Funk Song #11" (Take 2 Working Title Of "What You Need") (Alternative Take)		4:27
3.	"Press The Blue And Red Button" (Studio Dialogue)		0:24
4.	"Kiss the Dirt" (Studio Demo)		3:04
5.	"Meaning of the Song "Listen Like Thieves"" (Interview Excerpt)		0:36
6.	"Listen Like Thieves" (Studio Demo)	Beers; Hutchence; Pengilly; T. Farriss; A. Farriss; J. Farriss	2:33
7.	"INXS SA FM Radio Spot"		0:07
8.	"One X One" (Studio Demo)		3:04
9.	"This Time" (Studio Demo)	A. Farriss	2:49
10.	"Shine Like It Does" (Studio Demo)		2:34
11.	"Good + Bad Times" (Alternate Take)	Pengilly; Hutchence	2:50
12.	"Red Red Sun" (Studio Jam)	J. Farriss; A. Farriss	1:24
13.	"Red Red Sun" (Alternate Outtake)	J. Farriss; A. Farriss	3:50
14.	"Recording of "Same Direction""		0:35
15.	"Funk Song #9" (Working Title Of "Same Direction") (Studio Demo)		4:54
16.	"What You Need" (Calvin Bell Home Demo)		3:48
17.	"Shine Like It Does" (Andrew's Home Demo)		2:30
18.	"Listen Like Thieves" (Home Demo)	Beers; Hutchence; Pengilly; T. Farriss; A. Farriss; J. Farriss	2:23
19.	"Kiss the Dirt" (Calvin Bell Home Demo)		3:15

Disc three, Live from Royal Albert Hall (24 June 1986)
No.	Title	Writer(s)	Length
1.	"Introduction by Pete Drummond"		0:11
2.	"Same Direction"		4:58
3.	"Soul Mistake"		3:20
4.	"Kiss the Dirt (Falling Down The Mountain)"		4:03
5.	"Biting Bullets"	Pengilly; Hutchence	2:50
6.	"Burn for You"		4:55
7.	"Do Wot You Do"		3:12
8.	"Original Sin"		5:15
9.	"Different World"		4:14
10.	"Shine Like It Does"		3:26
11.	"Listen Like Thieves"	Beers; Hutchence; Pengilly; T. Farriss; A. Farriss; J. Farriss	3:52
12.	"One X One"		2:56
13.	"What You Need"		4:19
14.	"Red Red Sun"		3:15

Side one Vinyl LP (2025 Giles Martin & Paul Hicks Mix)
No.	Title	Writer(s)	Length
1.	"What You Need"		3:35
2.	"Listen Like Thieves"	Beers; Hutchence; Pengilly; T. Farriss; A. Farriss; J. Farriss	3:46
3.	"Kiss the Dirt (Falling Down the Mountain)"		3:56
4.	"Shine Like It Does"		3:05
5.	"Good + Bad Times"	Pengilly; Hutchence	2:46

Side two
No.	Title	Writer(s)	Length
6.	"Biting Bullets"	Pengilly; Hutchence	2:49
7.	"This Time"	A. Farriss	3:11
8.	"Three Sisters" (instrumental)	T. Farriss	2:27
9.	"Same Direction"		4:58
10.	"One x One"		3:05
11.	"Red Red Sun"	J. Farriss; A. Farriss	3:32

== Personnel ==
Personnel as listed in the album's liner notes are:

INXS

- Michael Hutchence – vocals
- Andrew Farriss – keyboards, guitar
- Kirk Pengilly – guitar, saxophone, vocals
- Tim Farriss – guitar, synthesizers
- Garry Gary Beers – bass
- Jon Farriss – drums

Additional personnel

- Ray Cooper – percussion on "Same Direction"
- Ann Odell – string arrangements

Production

- Chris Thomas – producer
- Steve Churchyard – engineer
- INXS – art direction
- Philip Mortlock – design, art, photography
- Andy Rosen – inner spread photography
- Stuart Spence – back cover group photography

== Charts and certifications ==
=== Weekly charts ===
Weekly chart performance for Listen Like Thieves
Chart (1985–1986)	Peak position
Australian Albums (Kent Music Report)	1
Canadian Albums (RPM)	24
New Zealand Albums (RMNZ)	4
Swiss Albums (Schweizer Hitparade)	30
UK Albums (Official Charts)	48
US Billboard 200	11

=== Year-end charts ===
1985 year-end chart performance for Listen Like Thieves
Chart (1985)	Peak position
Australia (Kent Music Report)	22
New Zealand Albums (RMNZ)	45

1986 year-end chart performance for Listen Like Thieves
Chart (1986)	Peak position
Australia (Kent Music Report)	14
New Zealand Albums (RMNZ)	18

=== Certifications ===
Certifications for Listen Like Thieves
Region	Certification	Certified units/sales
Australia (ARIA)	4× Platinum	280,000^{^}
New Zealand (RMNZ)	Platinum	15,000^{^}
United States (RIAA)	2× Platinum	2,000,000^{^}
Summaries
Worldwide	—	3,500,000
^{^} Shipments figures based on certification alone.
