= Autoluminescent =

- Directed by: Lynn-Maree Milburn & Richard Lowenstein
- Written by: Lynn-Maree Milburn
- Produced by: Richard Lowenstein, Andrew de Groot, Lynn-Maree Milburn, Genevieve McGuckin, Rowland S. Howard
- Starring: Rowland S. Howard, Harry Howard, Angela Howard, Nick Cave, Mick Harvey, Ollie Olsen, Wim Wenders, Lydia Lunch, Adalita Srsen
- Cinematography: Andrew de Groot
- Edited by: Richard Lowenstein & Lynn-Maree Milburn
- Music by: JP Shilo, Rowland S. Howard, The Birthday Party, These Immortal Souls, Crime and the City Solution
- Production company: Ghost Pictures
- Distributed by: Umbrella Entertainment (ANZ), Odin's Eye Entertainment (ROW Sales Agent)
- Release date: 27 October 2011
- Running time: 110 minutes
- Country: Australia
- Language: English

Autoluminescent, directed by Lynn-Maree Milburn and Richard Lowenstein, is a 2011 documentary film about musician Rowland S. Howard.

== Festivals and awards ==
Autoluminescent won an ATOM Award in 2012 in the Best Documentary Biography section. The world premiere of Autoluminescent was at the Melbourne International Film Festival in August 2011. Autoluminescent premiered internationally at the Santa Barbara International Film Festival in 2012.
