= Ecco Homo =

- Directed by: Lynn-Maree Milburn; Richard Lowenstein.
- Release date: 2015
- Country: Australia
- Language: Ebglish

Ecco Homo is a 2015 documentary film about provocateur, artist & performer: Peter Vanessa "Troy" Davies directed by Lynn-Maree Milburn and Richard Lowenstein.

== Festivals and awards ==
The world premiere of Ecco Homo was at the Melbourne International Film Festival in August 2015.
