= Original Sin (INXS song) =

- Cover art for Australian release

Single by INXS

from the album The Swing
- B-side: "In Vain"; "Just Keep Walking"
- Released: December 1983
- Genre: New wave; funk rock; dance-rock
- Length: 5:19 (album version); 3:45 (single edit); 6:35 (12" extended version)
- Label: WEA
- Songwriters: Michael Hutchence; Andrew Farriss
- Producer: Nile Rodgers

INXS singles chronology
"Black and White" (1983)	"Original Sin" (1983)	"I Send a Message" (1984)

"Original Sin" is a song by Australian rock group INXS, released as the first single from the band's fourth album, The Swing (1984). It was written by Michael Hutchence and Andrew Farriss, and produced by Nile Rodgers.

Released as a single in December 1983, it became the group's first single to reach the Australian top 10, reaching No. 1 in early 1984; it was the group's only No. 1 hit in Australia. The song also reached No. 20 in Canada and No. 58 in the US.

== Composition ==
Pengilly said, "Michael wrote the lyrics and each time I ask him what they mean I get something different. The main theme of it really is — it's almost a hippy song! — it's about everyone joining together, and it's also about people's desires, and waking up the next morning and finding them washed away."

== Details ==
Daryl Hall sings the chorus with Hutchence. During an interview in Australia, Hall said Nile Rodgers called him and asked him to sing on the song. Rodgers had participated in remixing the single "Adult Education" for Hall & Oates the previous year.

Two music videos for the song were filmed in Japan. Riding on motorcycles, the band members accompany a convoy of trucks to a vacant lot, where a fairground is set up and later dismantled around them as they play; at the end, the band then rides away with the trucks. The alternate version (in fact the original one) shows an Asian woman appearing at some moments and has a different ending.

In 2010, INXS rerecorded "Original Sin" with American vocalist Rob Thomas and Cuban female rapper DJ Yalediys as a dance single. It is featured in the 2010 INXS tribute album Original Sin.

== Reception ==
Cash Box said the song "is a politically clever track which dreams of a racially equal and peaceful world, while also working as a tight dance single."

In February 2014, after the Seven Network airing of INXS: Never Tear Us Apart mini-series, "Original Sin" charted again in Australia via download sales. It peaked at no. 61 on the ARIA Singles Chart.

In January 2018, as part of Triple M's "Ozzest 100", the 'most Australian' songs of all time, "Original Sin" was ranked number 58.

== Track listing ==
7" single Track listing

No.	Title	Writer(s)	Length
1.	"Original Sin"	M. Hutchence, A. Farriss	3:45
2.	"In Vain/Just Keep Walking" (Live)	G. Beers, M. Hutchence, A. Farris, J. Farris, T. Farris, K. Pingily	7:24

12"/CD Maxi single Track listing

No.	Title	Writer(s)	Length
1.	"Original Sin" (Extended remix)	M. Hutchence, A. Farriss	6:23
2.	"Jan's Song" (Live)	M. Hutchence, A. Farriss	3:06
3.	"To Look at You" (Live)	A. Farris	3:39

== Charts ==
=== Weekly charts ===
Year	Chart	Peak position
1984	Australia (Kent Music Report)	1
1984	Belgium (Ultratop 50 Flanders)	29
1984	Canada Top Singles (RPM)	20
1984	France (IFOP)	1
1984	Netherlands (Dutch Top 40)	29
1984	Netherlands (Single Top 100)	31
1984	New Zealand (Recorded Music NZ)	6
1984	Paraguay (UPI)	2
1984	Switzerland (Schweizer Hitparade)	23
1984	US Billboard Hot 100	58
1984	US Cash Box Top 100	62
1995	Israel (Israeli Singles Chart)	4
1995	UK Pop Tip Club Chart (Music Week)	32
2006^{1}	France (SNEP)	55
2011	US Billboard Hot Dance Club Songs	1

^{1}Kash vs. INXS – Dream on Black Girl (Original Sin)

=== Year-end charts ===
Chart (1984)	Position
Australia (Kent Music Report)	12
France (IFOP)	55

== Certifications ==
Region	Certification	Certified units/sales
New Zealand (RMNZ)	Gold	15,000^{‡}
^{‡} Sales+streaming figures based on certification alone.

== See also ==
- List of number-one singles in Australia during the 1980s
- List of number-one dance singles of 2011 (U.S.)
