= Bob Maguire =

Australian priest (1934–2023)

The Reverend Bob Maguire AO RFD
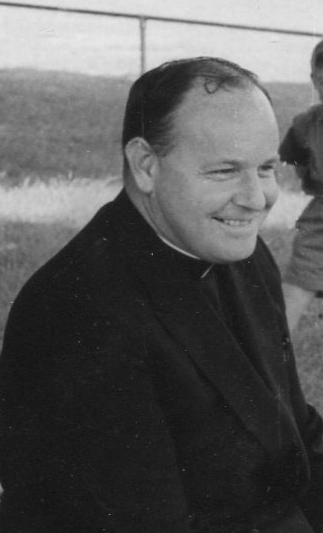
- Maguire in the early 1960s
- Church: Roman Catholic
- In office: 1973–2012
- Predecessor: Lou Heriot
- Successor: Julian Messina OFM Cap

Orders
- Ordination: 24 July 1960

Personal details
- Born: Robert John Maguire; 14 September 1934 Thornbury, Victoria, Australia
- Died: 19 April 2023 (aged 88) Malvern, Victoria, Australia
- Denomination: Roman Catholic
- Parents: Annie McLoughlin and James Maguire
- Occupation: Priest; Radio presenter; Community worker; Australian Army chaplain
- Education: Corpus Christi College, Melbourne
- fatherbobs.com

Robert John Maguire AO RFD (14 September 1934 – 19 April 2023), also known as Robert John Thomas Maguire and commonly known as Father Bob, was an Australian Roman Catholic priest, community worker, and media personality. From 1973 to 2012, Maguire was parish priest of Sts Peter and Paul's Church in South Melbourne. Known for his social justice advocacy and care for the disadvantaged members of society, Maguire was appointed a Member of the Order of Australia (AO) in 1989 for his services to homeless people through the Open Family Foundation.

Maguire remained active in community work in his retirement as chairman of the Father Bob's Foundation.

== Early life and education ==
Robert John Maguire was born on 14 September 1934 in the Melbourne suburb of Thornbury. His father, James Maguire, was a violent alcoholic who migrated from Glasgow in 1922. His mother, Annie (née McLaughlin), from Edinburgh, was usually the subject of her husband's beatings, which frequently left her "cut, bloodied and bruised". Maguire's only memory of his father taking any notice of him was when "he'd been away and when he came home, he beat me with his belt".

Maguire was the youngest of five children. His siblings were Eileen, Kathleen, James (Jim), and Marguerite. The family had to move house a number of times when all of the rent money was spent on drink. The family was very poor and the young Maguire rarely had socks and also had to borrow his brother's old services overcoat to hide the holes in the clothes he wore to school. He "looked up to his long-suffering mum" and saw her as a "model of Christian piety".

Maguire attended Our Lady of Lourdes Catholic Primary School in Armadale from 1940 to 1947, and became an altar boy when he turned eight. He received a scholarship from the Returned Services League to attend the private school Christian Brothers College, St Kilda, from 1948 to 1953.

His sister Kathleen died from tuberculosis in 1945 when he was 11. His father died from lung cancer in 1947, aged 63, and his mother died in 1950, aged 61, leaving Maguire orphaned at 15.

Upon confirmation in the Catholic Church, per custom, he adopted the confirmation name "Thomas" and became Robert John Thomas Maguire.

== Priesthood ==
In 1953, at age 18, Maguire began studying theology at Corpus Christi College, Melbourne, where he received his training for the priesthood. During this time he was a beekeeper, which he described as "one of the finest periods of my life". He was ordained on 24 July 1960 at age 25.

In 1965, Maguire joined the Australian Army Reserve. During the Vietnam War era, as a lieutenant colonel, he was commanding officer of the Character Training Unit for young officers.

From 1973 to 2012, Maguire was parish priest of Sts Peter and Paul's Church in South Melbourne.

== Other activities ==
=== Foundation ===
The Father Bob's Foundation began in 2003 "in an attempt to gather all my social investments together under one Board of Governance". The "Bob Squad" is the foundation's volunteer fund-raising and welfare provision arm, which is styled on and inspired by Maguire's sense of revolutionary approach to social justice. Its slogan is "Viva La Bob" and social media activity were designed to suggest a similarity to the activities of Che Guevara and Martin Luther King Jr. In the mid-1980s, Maguire started Open Family Australia, providing aid to the street children of Melbourne.

Maguire remained as the chairman of the Father Bob's Foundation after retirement. The foundation, which operates within the City of Port Phillip, is engaged in the local community as a grassroots organisation and conducts activities such as delivering meals, providing food from its pantry and social advocacy.

=== Social justice and other community work ===
Maguire was known as a "social justice warrior", one who cared deeply about the well-being of the poor, disadvantaged, the homeless and other vulnerable members of society.

Maguire was the patron of Dance World, a local dance studio that offers scholarships and opportunities to local children. He was previously chairman of Open Family and involved in Emerald Hill Mission, having been an integral part of the establishment of both organisations. According to Maguire, the most important funeral he ever conducted was that of Victor Peirce.

=== Media work ===
Maguire hosted a radio show on Melbourne radio station 3AW.

He made a guest appearance on the Special Broadcasting Service (SBS) television program John Safran vs God with the Melbourne satirist and documentarian John Safran. From November 2005 to January 2006, he joined Safran as co-host of Speaking in Tongues on SBS television. He was co-host of Sunday Night Safran on Australian national youth radio station Triple J on Sunday nights from 2005 to 2015, and accumulated more than 120,000 followers on Twitter.

In October 2009, Maguire started working as a judge for the public speaking contest Strictly Speaking, which aired in late 2010. He joined other judges, including Jean Kittson and host Andrew Hansen.

== Later life ==
On 7 September 2009, Maguire announced on his blog that he had been contacted by church authorities and asked to tender his resignation on his upcoming 75th birthday. He replied with a public announcement that he would leave the decision of whether he should stay or go to his congregation. Maguire was finally forced to retire at age 77. He held his last service at the church on 29 January 2012. It was reported as standing room only with at least 1,000 in attendance.

Maguire's life and forced retirement was the subject of the 2013 feature-length documentary In Bob We Trust, directed by Lynn-Maree Milburn. The documentary premiered at the Melbourne International Film Festival on 27 July 2013.

He continued his work at radio station Triple J until the end of 2015.

Maguire died at Cabrini Hospital in Malvern, Melbourne, on 19 April 2023, at age 88. He was posthumously made an Officer of the Order of Australia.

== Honours and awards ==
2024	Officer of the Order of Australia
?	Reserve Force Decoration
15 September 1980	National Medal
15 May 1986	National Medal – 1st Clasp
1 January 2001	Centenary Medal "For long service to the congregation of Sts Peter and Paul's Church and the local community"

- 12 June 1989: Member of the Order of Australia "for service to homeless youth through the Open Family Foundation"
- 2011: Victorian of the Year
- 2011 & 2016: Finalist for Senior Australian of the Year
