= Dancing on the Jetty =

Single by INXS

from the album The Swing
- Released: December 12th 1984
- Genre: Rock, new wave
- Length: 4:08
- Label: WEA
- Songwriter(s): Andrew Farriss; Michael Hutchence
- Producer(s): Nick Launay

INXS singles chronology
"Burn for You" (1984)	"Dancing on the Jetty" (1984)	"What You Need" (1985)

"Dancing on the Jetty" is the fourteenth single by Australian rock group INXS and the fourth and final one released from their fourth studio album The Swing. The single was released in December 1984 by WEA.

== Background ==
The song was written by Michael Hutchence and Andrew Farriss and produced by Nick Launay. "Dancing on the Jetty" was released only in Australia and reached the 39th place in the Australian Music Charts. The video was filmed by Richard Lowenstein.

== B-side ==
The B-side is the experimental track "The Harbour" written and produced by Andrew Farriss.

== Track listing ==
No.	Title	Writer(s)	Length
1.	"Dancing on the Jetty"	Andrew Farriss, Michael Hutchence	4:08
2.	"The Harbour"	Andrew Farriss	5:11

== Charts ==
Chart (1984)	Peak position
Australia (Kent Music Report)	39
