= Lynn-Maree Milburn =

Australian filmmaker

- Born: Melbourne, Australia
- Occupations: Film Director, Writer, Editor, Producer
- Known for: In Bob We Trust, Autoluminescent, Memories and Dreams

Lynn-Maree Milburn is an Australian writer, director, editor and film producer. Milburn directed the feature-length documentary In Bob We Trust and co-directed the feature-length documentary Autoluminescent,

In 1993 she wrote, animated, produced and directed Memories and Dreams, a feature-length dramatised documentary that was an Official Selection at the Venice, Telluride, and Yamagata Film Festivals, and Hungary's Mediawave. Memories and Dreams won multiple awards including the Jury Prize at Mediawave, Best Film at the Melbourne International Film Festival and the AFI Open Craft Award.

Milburn co-produced Amiel Courtin-Wilson's documentary Chasing Buddha, co-directed John Safran's Music Jamboree for SBS (AFI Award Best Television Comedy 2003), directed several stories for John Safran's Race Relations whilst continuing to direct television commercials. She has animated and directed numerous music videos including "What You Need" for INXS, and "Desire" for U2 winning several local and international awards.

She co-founded the production company, Ghost Pictures Pty Ltd with Andrew de Groot and Richard Lowenstein.

== Filmography ==
- Memories and Dreams (feature-length dramatised documentary, 1993)
- John Safran's Music Jamboree (a light-hearted music documentary television series, hosted by John Safran for SBS television, 2002)
- John Safran's Race Relations (a comedy documentary television series by John Safran broadcast on ABC1, 2009)
- Autoluminescent (documentary feature film on the life of Rowland S. Howard, 2011)
- In Bob We Trust (documentary feature film about Father Bob Maguire, 2013)
- Ecco Homo (documentary feature film on the life of Peter Vanessa "Troy" Davies, 2015)
