= Black and White (INXS song) =

Single by INXS

from the album Shabooh Shoobah
- Released: March 1983
- Recorded: January, June 1982
- Studio: Rhinoceros Recordings (Sydney)
- Genre: Rock, pop
- Length: 4:54
- Label: WEA
- Songwriters: Andrew Farriss, Michael Hutchence
- Producer: Mark Opitz

INXS singles chronology
"To Look at You" (1982)	"Black and White" (1983)	"Original Sin" (1983)

"Black and White" is the tenth single by Australian rock group INXS, and the fourth and final one issued from their third studio album Shabooh Shoobah (1982). The single was released in June 1983 by WEA. The song is a throwback to INXS's quicker-tempo new wave style; "Black and White" peaked at the 24th place in the ARIA Charts.

== B-side ==
The single also contains two songs: "Long in Tooth" written by Andrew Farriss and "Any Day but Sunday" written by Tim Farriss. Both tracks were recorded in Emerald City Studios. "Any Day but Sunday" appeared on the soundtrack for the 1984 film No Small Affair, starring Demi Moore and Jon Cryer.

== Track listing ==
No.	Title	Writer(s)	Length
1.	"Black and White"	Andrew Farriss, Michael Hutchence	4:54
2.	"Long in Tooth"	Andrew Farriss	3:40
3.	"Any Day but Sunday"	Tim Farriss	4:24
