= The One Thing (INXS song) =

- Australian 7-inch vinyl single

Single by INXS

from the album Shabooh Shoobah
- B-side: "Space Shuttle"
- Released: July 1982
- Recorded: 1982
- Genre: New wave
- Length: 3:24 (album version); 3:18 (single edit); 6:06 (12" extended version)
- Label: Warner Music (North America, Oceania, Japan, Southeast Asia); Mercury Records (Europe)
- Songwriters: Michael Hutchence, Andrew Farriss
- Producer: Mark Opitz

INXS singles chronology
| "Underneath the Colours" (1982) | "The One Thing" (1982) | "Don't Change" (1982) |

Music video
- The One Thing on YouTube

"The One Thing" is a song by Australian rock group INXS, released in July 1982 as the first single ahead of their third studio album, Shabooh Shoobah, which appeared in October that year.

At the 1982 Countdown Music Awards, the song was nominated for Best Australian Single.

== Background ==
In January 1982, INXS toured New Zealand as support act for Cold Chisel. Band manager Chris Murphy became convinced their future no longer lay with Deluxe Records. RCA (who distributed Deluxe) had employed music lover Rockin' Rod Woods, who had been promoting Eric Clapton, Split Enz and some of the world's biggest acts. Woods was passionate about the band and brought key music people along to their gigs. He encouraged RCA to sign them worldwide because Murphy had played him some demos of future songs. Deluxe had been unable to attract international interest, and the band decided to record a new song at their own expense, with Mark Opitz at Paradise Studios. The resultant single, "One Thing", peaked at number 14 on the Australian Kent Music Report Singles Chart. Due to the success of the song Murphy hired Opitz to produce three more songs. Murphy also approached WEA Australia with copies of the song, leading to INXS signing a recording deal in July 1982 with WEA for releases in Australia, South East Asia, Japan and New Zealand, Atco Records (a subsidiary of Atlantic Records) for North America and Polygram for Europe and the UK.

Shabooh Shoobah was released in the United States in February 1983 and peaked at number 46 on the Billboard 200 album chart. "The One Thing" brought INXS their first Top 40 hit in the US, reaching number 30 on the Billboard Hot 100 in May–June 1983. It was a big hit on album-oriented rock radio, reaching number 2 on the Billboard Top Tracks chart, and was also a top 20 hit in Canada.

The music video for the song, directed by Soren Jensen, featured the band members having a decadent banquet with a number of beautiful models, including Hutchence's then-girlfriend, Michele Bennett, interspersed with clips of the band playing their instruments. Hutchence knew Jensen, who was an assistant director on the Australian soap opera, The Young Doctors, through his mother, Patricia, who was a make-up artist for the show. The models, Susan Stenmark and Karen Pini, who appear in the music video were also actresses on The Young Doctors. The music video was their first video to air on the fledgling MTV and went into high rotation on the channel, which added to the chart success of the single in the US.

We made a crazy video at home in Australia for "The One Thing." We fed valium to a few cats and had them running around a table while we had a feast with sexy models and Playboy centerfolds, ripping apart a turkey. Next thing we knew we had a top 40 hit in America and were opening for Adam Ant. Tim Farriss

== Track listings ==
7" single

| No. | Title | Writer(s) | Length |
|---|---|---|---|
| 1. | "The One Thing" | M. Hutchence, A. Farriss | 3:18 |
| 2. | "Space Shuttle" | A. Farris | 2:39 |

12" maxi-single

| No. | Title | Writer(s) | Length |
|---|---|---|---|
| 1. | "One Thing" (Extended remix) | M. Hutchence, A. Farriss | 6:06 |
| 2. | "Phantim of the Opera" | M. Hutchence, A. Farriss | 4:26 |
| 3. | "Space Shuttle" | A. Farris | 2:39 |

== Charts ==
=== Weekly charts ===
| Chart (1982–83) | Peak position |
|---|---|
| Australia (Kent Music Report) | 14 |
| Canada (RPM) | 31 |
| U.S. Billboard Hot 100 | 30 |
| U.S. Billboard Top Tracks | 2 |
| U.S. Cash Box Top 100 | 30 |

=== Year-end charts ===
Year-end chart performance for "The One Thing"
| Chart (1982) | Position |
|---|---|
| Australia (Kent Music Report) | 99 |
