= Shabooh Shoobah =

Studio album by INXS
- Released: 13 October 1982
- Recorded: January, June 1982
- Studios: Paradise (Sydney); Rhinoceros (Sydney)
- Genres: New wave, rock, post-punk
- Length: 35:23
- Labels: Warner Music, Mercury
- Producer: Mark Opitz

INXS chronology
INXSIVE (1982)	Shabooh Shoobah (1982)	Dekadance (1983)

Singles from Shabooh Shoobah
- 1. "The One Thing" Released: July 1982; 2. "Don't Change" Released: October 1982; 3. "To Look at You" Released: March 1983; 4. "Black and White" Released: June 1983

Shabooh Shoobah is the third studio album by Australian rock band INXS. It was released on 13 October 1982. It peaked at No. 5 on the ARIA Albums Chart and remained on the chart for 94 weeks. It was the band's first album to be released worldwide and appeared on the United States Billboard 200 and on the Hot Pop Albums Chart. The album spawned four singles, "The One Thing", "Don't Change", "To Look at You" and "Black and White". It was produced by Mark Opitz for WEA Australia with most tracks written by band members Andrew Farriss and Michael Hutchence.

== Background and production ==
INXS's third album, Shabooh Shoobah, developed after they decided in early 1982 to record a new song, "The One Thing", at their own expense, with Mark Opitz at Paradise Studios. The song turned out so well that band hired Opitz to produce three more songs. WEA Australia were approached with copies, leading to INXS signing a recording deal in July 1982 with WEA for releases in Australia, South East Asia, Japan and New Zealand; with sister label Atco Records (a subsidiary of Atlantic Records) for North America and with PolyGram for United Kingdom and the rest of Europe.

Initially, INXS were not convinced that Opitz could produce an entire album that would attract international interest. Prior to recording the rest of Shabooh Shoobah, three band members, Kirk Pengilly, Michael Hutchence, and Andrew Farriss, visited the UK and United States, to select another producer. However, they found that no one they wanted was available and that most people advised them that Opitz's work on their single was as good as they could wish for. So in mid-1982, they commenced recording at Rhinoceros Studios, with Opitz. Tim Farriss felt "Mark was the first producer that was able to capture some glimmer of what the band felt it was like live. Prior to us, Mark had done bands like AC/DC, Cold Chisel, The Angels. Big guitar sounds, mighty drum beats".

The name "Shabooh Shoobah", an onomatopoeia of a rhythm in the song "Spy of Love", was coined by Tim Farriss. The album's cover, featuring a naked male torso and a whippet, was the work of Michael Hutchence and photographer Grant Matthews.

The album spawned four singles, "The One Thing", "Don't Change", "To Look at You" and "Black and White".

== Music videos ==
The music videos for "Don't Change" and "Spy of Love" were directed by South Australian director Scott Hicks, later known for his award-winning film Shine. Hicks also directed the video for "To Look at You" in 1983.

== Release ==
In October, Shabooh Shoobah was released internationally on Atlantic/Atco Records and Mercury Records, peaking at No. 52 on the US Billboard 200 and No. 46 on the Hot Pop Albums chart. In Australia it peaked at No. 5 on the ARIA Albums Chart and remained on the chart for 94 weeks. The lead single, "The One Thing", brought their first US Top 30 hit on 28 May 1983, it was a Top 20 hit in Canada, and peaked at No. 14 in Australia on 23 August 1982. "One Thing" was their first video to air on the fledgling MTV and added to the chart success of the single. INXS undertook their first US performance in San Diego in March 1983, to a crowd of 24 patrons. The tour was as support for Adam Ant, then support for Stray Cats, The Kinks, Hall & Oates followed by The Go-Go's. INXS played alongside many of their contemporaries on New Wave Day in May 1983, at the US Festival in Devore, California. It was during this time that Gary Grant, their co-manager, relocated permanently to New York to ensure a continual presence in the northern hemisphere. The band remained on the road in the US for most of the year, including support for Men at Work and by mid-1983 were headlining venues such as The Ritz in New York. In 2022, the 40th anniversary of the release of the album was marked with a digital-only Deluxe Edition with 15 bonus tracks, a clear vinyl reissue of the LP, plus the album Recorded Live at the US Festival 1983 on CD and LP, featuring performances of nine of its 10 songs ("Golden Playpen" was the only one left out). Four songs from that show were included in the Deluxe Edition.

== Reception ==
Professional ratings
Review scores
Source	Rating
AllMusic	3/5 stars
Arizona Daily Star	B
(The New)Rolling Stone Album Guide	3/5 stars

Reviewed at the time of release, Rolling Stone Australia wrote "After the funk and ska of their last two albums, this one is sort of expensive tribal - a touch of the furry animal, a hint of the pagan and some gilt edging. Perhaps it's too glib to dismiss INXS as the next Duran Duran, but undeniably Shabooh Shoobah has all the hallmarks of current British pop."

Rip It Up wrote "From the opening "The One Thing", it sways and swaggers through two sides of sheer musical bliss. Very ably led by vocalist Michael Hutchence, who handles all songs with an almost arrogant ease."

Paste listed "Shabooh Shoobah" in their list of the 20 Best albums of 1982."

AllMusic writer Marcy Donelson said it was "if not their most celebrated album, still full of dance-rock greatness from the slinky "To Look at You" to the racing "Black and White". Get ready to dance, press play, and pour one out again for Michael Hutchence."

Top 100 Albums of 1982: Slicing Up Eyeballs' Best of the '80s - part 3. Shabooh Shoobah is listed at #7 on the list of 100 greatest albums of 1982."

The Sydney Morning Herald praised the album, saying. "Inxs take it to the top." Paul Bennett of The Times Colonist, called it "a fine rock album, from another group of men who've been hard at work down under." He gave the album 4 out of 5 stars.

It peaked at No. 5 on the ARIA Albums Chart and remained on the chart for 94 weeks. It was the band's first album to be released worldwide and appeared on the United States Billboard 200 and on the Hot Pop Albums Chart.

At the 1982 Countdown Australian Music Awards, the album was nominated for Best Australian Album.

== Track listing ==
All tracks are written by Andrew Farriss and Michael Hutchence, unless otherwise indicated.

Side one
No.	Title	Writer(s)	Length
1.	"The One Thing"		3:24
2.	"To Look at You"	A. Farriss	3:55
3.	"Spy of Love"	Tim Farriss, Hutchence	3:58
4.	"Soul Mistake"		2:57
5.	"Here Comes"		3:00

Side two
No.	Title	Writer(s)	Length
6.	"Black and White"		3:40
7.	"Golden Playpen"	Hutchence, Kirk Pengilly	3:03
8.	"Jan's Song"		3:18
9.	"Old World New World"	Jon Farriss, Hutchence	3:38
10.	"Don't Change"	Garry Gary Beers, A. Farriss, J. Farriss, T. Farriss, Hutchence, Pengilly	4:24

40th Anniversary / Deluxe Edition bonus tracks
No.	Title	Writer(s)	Length
11.	"To Look at You (Extended Mix)"	A. Farriss	6:32
12.	"You Never Used to Cry"	J. Farriss	2:12
13.	"The One Thing (Extended Mix)"		6:09
14.	"The Sax Thing"	Pengilly	3:00
15.	"Soul Mistake (Live at the US Festival / 1983)"		3:09
16.	"Space Shuttle"	A. Farriss	2:42
17.	"Here Comes II"		3:28
18.	"Phantim of the Opera"	T. Farriss	3:11
19.	"Here Comes (Live at the US Festival / 1983)"		3:40
20.	"Long in Tooth"	A. Farriss	3:40
21.	"Black and White (Extended Mix)"		4:54
22.	"Go West"	A. Farriss, Pengilly, Jeffrey Bushelman	3:11
23.	"Spy of Love (Live at the US Festival / 1983)"	T. Farriss, Hutchence	3:22
24.	"Any Day But Sunday"	T. Farriss	4:22
25.	"Old World New World (Live at the US Festival / 1983)"	J. Farriss, Hutchence	4:38

== Personnel ==
INXS

- Michael Hutchence – vocals
- Andrew Farriss – keyboards
- Tim Farriss – guitars
- Kirk Pengilly – guitars, saxophone, vocals
- Garry Gary Beers – bass, vocals
- Jon Farriss – drums, percussion, vocals

Production

- Mark Opitz – producer, engineer
- David Walsh – engineer (1)
- David Nicholas – engineer (2–10)
- Andrew Scott – engineer (2–10)
- Bob Ludwig – mastering (US)
- Paul Ibbotson – mastering (Australia)
- Michael Hutchence – cover art concept
- Grant Matthews – cover art concept, photography
- Recorded at Paradise Studios (track 1) and Rhinoceros Studios (tracks 2–10) (Sydney, Australia)
- Mastered at Masterdisk (New York City, New York) and Festival Studios (Sydney, Australia)

== Charts ==
=== Weekly charts ===
Weekly chart performance for Shabooh Shoobah
Chart (1982–1984)	Peak position
Australian Albums (Kent Music Report)	5
US Top LPs & Tape (Billboard)	46

=== Year-end charts ===
Year-end chart performance for Shabooh Shoobah
Chart (1983)	Position
Australia (Kent Music Report)	22

== Certifications ==
Certifications for Shabooh Shoobah
Region	Certification	Certified units/sales
Australia (ARIA)	2× Platinum	140,000^{^}
United States (RIAA)	Gold	500,000^{^}
^{^} Shipments figures based on certification alone.
