= Eric Prydz discography =

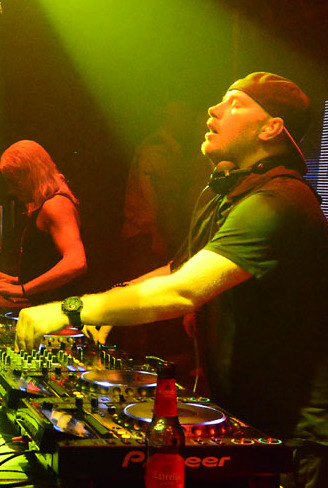
- Prydz performing at Amnesia in Ibiza, 2012
- Studio albums: 1
- EPs: 3
- Compilation albums: 1
- Singles: 19
- Music videos: 7

The following is a comprehensive discography of Swedish DJ and producer Eric Prydz. His discography comprises one studio album, one compilation album, three extended plays, eighteen singles, and other releases under various aliases.

== Albums ==
=== Studio albums ===
Title	Details	Peak chart positions					
Title	Details	AUS	BEL (FL)	SWI	UK	US	US Dance
Opus	Released: 5 February 2016; Labels: Virgin, Astralwerks; Formats: CD, digital download, vinyl	56	19	48	23	164	1

=== Compilation albums ===
Title	Details	Peak chart positions			
Title	Details	BEL (FL)	UK	US Heat	US Dance
Eric Prydz Presents Pryda	Released: 18 May 2012; Label: Virgin; Formats: CD, digital download	84	40	19	14

== Extended plays ==
Title	Details	Charts
Title	Details	UK
EP1	Released: 27 May 2002; Label: Credence; Format: Vinyl	—
EP2	Released: 30 November 2002; Label: Credence; Format: Vinyl	98
EP3	Released: 7 July 2003; Label: Credence; Format: Vinyl	81
"—" denotes a recording that did not chart or was not released in that territory.

== Singles ==
Title	Year	Peak chart positions											Certifications	Album
Title	Year	SWE	AUT	BEL (FL)	BEL (WA)	FRA	GER	IRE	NL	SWI	UK	US Dance	Certifications	Album
"By Your Side" / "Mr. Jingles"	2001	—	—	—	—	—	—	—	—	—	—	—		Non-album singles
"Bass-Ism" / "Groove Yard" (with Marcus Stork)	2001	—	—	—	—	—	—	—	—	—	—	—		Non-album singles
"Tha Disco"	2002	—	—	—	—	—	—	—	—	—	—	—		Non-album singles
"Slammin'"	2003	—	—	—	—	—	—	—	—	—	—	—		Non-album singles
"In and Out" (featuring Adeva)	2004	—	—	—	—	—	—	—	—	—	—	—		Non-album singles
"Call on Me"	2004	1	1	4	13	1	1	1	10	2	1	29	GLF: Gold; ARIA: Platinum; BPI: 2× Platinum; BVMI: 3× Gold; SNEP: Gold; IFPI SWI: Gold	Non-album singles
"Woz Not Woz" (with Steve Angello)	2005	—	—	—	—	50	63	—	—	84	55	—		Non-album singles
"Proper Education" (vs. Pink Floyd)	2006	7	20	2	12	10	4	9	4	12	2	1	IFPI DEN: Gold	Non-album singles
"Pjanoo"	2008	6	22	8	14	21	34	7	3	31	2	—	BPI: Platinum	Eric Prydz Presents Pryda
"2Night"	2011	—	—	—	—	—	—	—	—	—	—	—		Eric Prydz Presents Pryda
"Niton (The Reason)"	2011	—	—	68	—	—	66	—	82	—	45	—		Non-album single
"Every Day"	2012	—	—	55	79	—	—	—	61	—	—	3		Opus
"Liberate"	2014	—	—	100	—	—	—	—	—	—	71	28		Opus
"Tether" (vs. Chvrches)	2015	—	—	83	—	—	—	—	—	—	107	31		Non-album single
"Generate"	2015	—	—	—	—	—	—	—	—	—	—	8		Opus
"Opus"	2015	—	—	3	62	—	—	—	—	—	—	—		Opus
"Breathe" (featuring Rob Swire)	2016	—	—	—	—	—	—	—	—	—	—	—		Opus
"Last Dragon"	2016	—	—	—	—	—	—	—	—	—	—	—		Opus
"Nopus"	2020	—	—	—	—	—	—	—	—	—	—	—		Non-album single
"—" denotes single that did not chart or was not released in that territory.

== Other charted songs ==
Title	Year	Peak chart positions	Album
Title	Year	US Dance	Album
"Allein"	2012	12	Eric Prydz Presents Pryda

== Remixes ==
Title	Year	Original artist(s)	Release
"Echo Vibes"	2002	Outfunk	"Echo Vibes"
"PVC"	2002	Star Alliance	"PVC"
"I'm So Crazy"	2002	Par-T-One vs INXS	"I'm So Crazy"
"C'mon Lady"	2003	Harry's Afro Hut	"C'mon Lady"
"Lost In Music"	2003	Outfunk	"Lost In Music"
"Voices"	2003	Steve Angello	"Voices"
"The Power (Of Bhangra)"	2003	Snap! vs. Motivo	Cult of Snap!
"Come Together"	2003	M Factor	"Come Together"
"Destiny"	2003	The Attic	"Destiny"
"Pride's Paranoia"	2003	Futureshock	"Pride's Paranoia"
"Metropolis"	2003	Oliver Lieb Presents Smoked	Metropolis (The Remixes)
"Miracles"	2003	Pet Shop Boys	Non-album single
"Sex & Sun"	2003	Aloud	"Sex & Sun"
"(Reach Up for The) Sunrise"	2004	Duran Duran	Sunrise (Remixes)
"Lola's Theme"	2004	The Shapeshifters	"Lola's Theme"
"Holding On"	2004	Mutiny featuring Lorraine Cato	"Holding On"
"Rocker"	2004	Alter Ego	Rocker (Remixes)
"Feel the Vibe"	2005	Axwell	"Feel the Vibe"
"And Do You Feel Scared?"	2005	Howard Jones	Non-album remix
"A Bit Patchy"	2006	Switch	"A Bit Patchy"
"1983"	2006	Paolo Mojo	Eric Prydz Presents Pryda
"Thriller"	2006	Michael Jackson	Thriller Education
"Nice"	2006	Duran Duran	"Nice"
"Good Life"	2006	Inner City	Good Life (Eric Prydz Summer 2006 Edit)
"The Beauty and the Beast"	2007	Sven Väth	The Beauty and the Beast (Eric Prydz Re-Edit)
"Ron Hardy Said"	2008	Jim Rivers and Paolo Mojo	"Ron Hardy Said"
"The People"	2009	Sébastien Léger	"The People (Eric Prydz Remix)"
"Flashback"	2009	Calvin Harris	"Flashback"
"Not Going Home"	2010	Faithless	"Not Going Home"
"Thee Anthem"	2010	Felix Da Housecat	"Thee Anthem"
"Personal Jesus"	2011	Depeche Mode	Personal Jesus 2011
"Never Let Me Down Again"	2011	Depeche Mode	Remixes 2: 81–11
"Circles"	2011	Digitalism	"Circles"
"Midnight City"	2012	M83	The Sound of Swedish House
"The Veldt"	2014	Deadmau5 featuring Chris James	5 Years of mau5
"Breathe"	2019	CamelPhat and Cristoph featuring Jem Cooke	Non-album remix
"Consciousness"	2022	Anyma & Chris Avantgarde	Non-album remix

== As Pryda ==
=== Extended plays ===
Title	Details
Pryda 10 Vol I	Released: 6 July 2015; Label: Pryda Recordings; Format: Digital download
Pryda 10 Vol II	Released: 10 August 2015; Label: Pryda Recordings; Format: Digital download
Pryda 10 Vol III	Released: 8 October 2015; Label: Pryda Recordings; Format: Digital download
PR(10)DA	Released: 11 February 2016; Label: Pryda Recordings; Format: Digital download
Elements	Released: 18 May 2018; Label: Pryda Recordings; Format: Digital download
PR(15)DA	Released: 21 June 2019; Label: Pryda Recordings, Arista Records; Format: Digital download
Pryda 15: Vol. 1	Released: 21 June 2019; Label: Pryda Recordings, Arista Records; Format: Digital download
Pryda 15: Vol. 2	Released: 2 August 2019; Label: Pryda Recordings, Arista Records; Format: Digital download
Pryda 15: Vol. 3	Released: 4 October 2019; Label: Pryda Recordings, Arista Records; Format: Digital download
The Return / Of Me	Released: 28 July 2023; Label: Pryda Recordings; Format: Digital download

=== Singles ===
Title	Year	Album
"Human Behaviour" / "Lesson One"	2004	Non-album singles
"Spooks" / "Do It"	2004	Non-album singles
"Nile" / "Sucker DJ"	2005	Non-album singles
"Aftermath" / "The Gift"	2005	Eric Prydz Presents Pryda
"Remember" / "Frankfurt"	2006	Eric Prydz Presents Pryda
"RYMD" / "Armed"	2007	Eric Prydz Presents Pryda
"Ironman" / "Madderferrys"	2007	Non-album single
"Muranyi" / "Balaton"	2007	Eric Prydz Presents Pryda
"Europa" / "Odyssey"	2007	Eric Prydz Presents Pryda
"Pjanoo" / "F12"	2008	Eric Prydz Presents Pryda
"Evouh" / "Wakanpi" / "Rakfunk"	2008	Eric Prydz Presents Pryda
"Animal" / "Miami to Atlanta" / "Loaded"	2009	Eric Prydz Presents Pryda
"Melo" / "Lift" / "Reeperbahn"	2009	Eric Prydz Presents Pryda
"Waves" / "Alfon"	2009	Eric Prydz Presents Pryda
"RYMD 2010" / "Inspiration"	2010	Non-album single
"Emos" / "Viro"	2010	Eric Prydz Presents Pryda
"M.S.B.O.Y." / "The End"	2010	Eric Prydz Presents Pryda
"Niton" / "Vega"	2010	Non-album singles
"Illusions" / "Glimma"	2010	Non-album singles
"Mirage" / "Juletider" / "With Me"	2011	Eric Prydz Presents Pryda
"Bergen" / "Recomondos"	2012	Non-album singles
"Power Drive"	2013	Non-album singles
"Layers"	2013	Non-album singles
"Rotonda"	2013	Non-album singles
"Lycka" / "F.A.T."	2013	Non-album singles
"Mija" / "Origins" / "Backdraft" / "Axis"	2014	Non-album singles
"Choo" / "The End Is Just the Beginning" / "The Future"	2016	Non-album singles
"Lillo"	2016	Non-album singles
"Stay with Me"	2017	Non-album singles

=== Remixes ===
Title	Year	Original artist(s)	Release
"Niton (The Reason)"	2011	Eric Prydz	"Niton (The Reason)"
"Meridian"	2011	Guy J and Henry Saiz	Meridian / La Marea Remixes

== As Cirez D ==
=== Extended plays ===
Title	Details
Vol D	Released: 14 December 2015; Label: Pryda Recordings; Format: Digital download

=== Singles ===
2003

- Diamond Girl / It's Over / W-Dizco

2004

- Control Freak / Hoodpecker
- Deep Inside

2005

- Knockout / Lost Love
- Re-Match / B-Boy
- Teaser / Lollipop

2006

- Punch Drunk / Copyrat
- Mouseville Theme

2007

- Horizons / Tigerstyle

2008

- Läget?
- Stockholm Marathon / The Journey

2009

- The Tunnel / Raptor
- On Off / Fast Forward

2010

- Glow
- Bauerpost / Glow (In the Dark Dub)
- The Tumble / EXIT

2011

- Full Stop
- Tomorrow / Sirtos Madness (with Acki Kokotos)
- Mokba

2013

- Thunderstuck / Drums in the Deep

2014

- Accents / Revolution (free download)
- Ruby

2016

- In the Reds / Century of the Mouse
- Backlash / The Tournament

2017

- The Accuser

2018

- Dare U / The Glitch / Black Hole

2020

- Valborg / The Raid

=== Remixes ===
2006

- Double 99 – R.I.P. Groove (Cirez D Remix)

2008

- Christian Smith & John Selway – Total Departure (Cirez D Remix)

2018

- Beton (featuring Wevie Stonder) – Directions (The Cirez D Edit)

== As A&P Project ==
=== Singles ===
2003

- Sunrize (featuring Zemya Hamilton) (with Steve Angello)

== As AxEr ==
=== Singles ===
2006

- 123 / 321 (with Axwell)

== As Fiol Lasse ==
=== Singles ===
2009

- Svedala

== As Groove System ==
=== Singles ===
2001

- Vacuum Cleaner / Chord Funk (with Marcus Stork)

== As Hardform ==
=== Singles ===
2003

- Dirty Souls / Fear tha Pimps / Back to the Groove (with Marcus Stork)

== As Moo ==
=== Singles ===
2002

- Seashells

2003

- Jonico (Mediterranean Mix) (with Luciano Ingrosso)
- Sunset at Keywest

== As Sheridan ==
=== Singles ===
2002

- Sunlight Dancing
- Wants vs. Needs

2004

- High on You

2006

- Fatz Theme / Flycker

== As The Dukes of Sluca ==
=== Singles ===
2002

- Don't Stop / Steam Machine / Always Searching (with Andreas Postl)

2003

- Mighty Love (vs. Apollo) (with Andreas Postl)

== As Tonja Holma ==
=== Extended plays ===
2017

- Tonja Holma

=== Singles ===
2021

- All Night
