= Stay Young 1979–1982 =

Compilation album by INXS

Compilation album by INXS
- Released: 11 October 2002
- Recorded: 1979–1982
- Genre: Rock
- Label: Raven
- Producer: Martin Hannett; Duncan McGuire; Richard Clapton; Mark Opitz; INXS

INXS chronology
The Best of INXS (2002)	Stay Young 1979–1982 (2002)	Definitive INXS (2002)

Stay Young 1979–1982 or Stay Young 1979–1982: The Complete 'Deluxe Years' is a two disc compilation by Australian rock group INXS's earlier works, when they were signed to the Deluxe label. It features their first two studio albums, INXS (October 1980) and Underneath the Colours (October 1981), along with associated b-sides "We Are the Vegetables", "Scratch", "The Unloved One", "Lacavocal" and "Prehistoria".

It also features demos: "Telefone", "Silent Night" and "Breakaway" performed at ABC Studios in Sydney (1979); live tracks "Reckless Ways", "Pretzel Logic", "Reasons", "Feeling Good" and "Miss Shapiro/You Really Got Me" (performed at the Manly Vale Hotel in Sydney, 24 October 1980); "On a Bus" and "The One Thing" (performed at Wanda Beach in Sydney, 31 January 1982); and the band performing their earlier songs in 1992 at a soundcheck: "Barbarian", "Just Keep Walking", "In Vain" and "Stay Young" (recorded during the Full Moon, Dirty Hearts session on 24 November 1992 in Capri, Italy). It also features "Speed Kills" (a song recorded by lead singer, Michael Hutchence, as a solo single with fellow Australian band, Cold Chisel, for the Freedom movie soundtrack), and a re-recording of the song "Underneath the Colours" as a UK-only b-side for "Beautiful Girl" in 1992.

Liner notes for the compilation were written by journalists, Glenn A. Baker and Ian McFarlane, for the Raven Records label. "Simple Simon" and "The Loved One" were each initially released as non-album singles. "The Loved One" was a cover version; the original by The Loved Ones had appeared in May 1966. INXS recorded another version in 1987 for their sixth studio album, Kick.

== Track listing ==
Disc one

1. "Simple Simon"
2. "On a Bus"
3. "Doctor"
4. "Just Keep Walking"
5. "Learn to Smile"
6. "Jumping"
7. "In Vain"
8. "Roller Skating"
9. "Body Language"
10. "Newsreel Babies"
11. "Wishy Washy"
12. "The Loved One"
13. "Stay Young"
14. "Horizons"
15. "Big Go Go"
16. "Underneath the Colours"
17. "Fair Weather Ahead"
18. "Night of Rebellion"
19. "Follow"
20. "Barbarian"
21. "What Would You Do"
22. "Just to Learn Again"

Disc two

1. "We Are the Vegetables"
2. "Scratch"
3. "The Unloved One"
4. "Lacavocal"
5. "Prehistoria"
6. "Telefone"
7. "Silent Night"
8. "Breakaway"
9. "Reckless Ways" (live)
10. "Pretzel Logic" (live)
11. "Reasons" (live)
12. "Feeling Good" (live)
13. "Miss Shapiro/You Really Got Me" (live)
14. "On a Bus" (live)
15. "The One Thing" (live)
16. "Speed Kills"
17. "Underneath the Colours" (Chicken Mix)
18. "Barbarian"
19. "Just Keep Walking"
20. "In Vain"
21. "Stay Young"
