= Definitive INXS =

Compilation album by INXS
- Released: 14 October 2002
- Recorded: 1980–1997
- Genres: Rock, new wave, alternative rock, post-punk, dance-rock
- Label: Mercury Records
- Producer: Various

INXS chronology
Stay Young 1979–1982 (2002)	Definitive INXS (2002)	The Years 1979–1997 (2002)

Definitive INXS is a compilation of Australian rock band INXS released in 2002. It has almost the same track listing as The Best of INXS. The compilation features most of their hit singles, as well as two previously unreleased tracks, "Salvation Jane" and "Tight". "Salvation Jane" is an outtake taken from the X sessions in 1990. The 2002 remaster of X features the song's original demo. "Tight" was written by songwriter and multi-instrumentalist Andrew Farriss and recorded by the band during the sessions for Welcome to Wherever You Are in 1992. The song was reworked by the remaining members of INXS in 2002 after the death of vocalist Michael Hutchence in 1997. The compilation also features a cover of Steppenwolf's "Born to Be Wild", which was specially recorded for the April 1993 launch of Virgin Radio in the UK and was first included on the Japanese release of Full Moon, Dirty Hearts.

== Reception ==
Professional ratings
Review scores
Source	Rating
AllMusic	4/5 stars

In his AllMusic review, writer Andy Kellman rated the compilation four stars out of five and compared Definitive INXS with other different double-disc INXS anthologies released that same year, calling Definitive INXS "considerably different" and highlighted the differences in both discs. He said, "While it's nice to have the disc of videos, it's the type of thing that only hardcore fans - and not people who just want the hits - would care to have." He ended his review by saying, "The saving grace is that Definitive INXS goes for the price of a single disc, but a band with too many key moments to fit onto one disc is deserving of better, like Shine Like It Does and The Years."

=== Commercial performance ===
Although the album never charted in the band's native Australia, it was soon certified platinum by the Australian Recording Industry Association (ARIA) in March 2003 for sales of 70,000 copies. The album entered the New Zealand charts three years later on 8 August 2005 where it peaked at number 4 and remained in the charts for 4 weeks. It was certified platinum by the Recorded Music NZ (RMNZ) for sales of 15,000 copies. Definitive INXS also performed well in the United Kingdom peaking at number 15 and staying in the charts for 4 weeks. The British Phonographic Industry (BPI) certified the album gold on 22 July 2013 for sales of 100,000 copies.

== Track listing ==
Disc 1

No.	Title	Writer(s)	Album	Length
1.	"Need You Tonight"	Andrew Farriss, Michael Hutchence	Kick 1987	3:04
2.	"What You Need"	A. Farriss, M. Hutchence	Listen Like Thieves 1985	3:36
3.	"Disappear"	Jon Farriss, M. Hutchence	X 1990	4:07
4.	"Baby Don't Cry"	A. Farriss	Welcome to Wherever You Are 1992	4:41
5.	"Elegantly Wasted"	A. Farriss, M. Hutchence	Elegantly Wasted 1997	4:34
6.	"Mystify"	A. Farriss, M. Hutchence	Kick	3:19
7.	"Just Keep Walking"	Garry Gary Beers, A. Farriss, J. Farriss, Tim Farriss, M. Hutchence, Kirk Pengilly	INXS 1980	2:51
8.	"Suicide Blonde"	A. Farriss, M. Hutchence	X	3:51
9.	"Never Tear Us Apart"	A. Farriss, M. Hutchence	Kick	3:03
10.	"Shining Star"	A. Farriss	Live Baby Live 1991	3:43
11.	"Beautiful Girl"	A. Farriss	Welcome to Wherever You Are	3:10
12.	"Listen Like Thieves"	G. Beers, A. Farriss, J. Farriss, T. Farriss, M. Hutchence, K. Pengilly	Listen Like Thieves	3:45
13.	"New Sensation"	A. Farriss, M. Hutchence	Kick	3:41
14.	"Bitter Tears"	A. Farriss, M. Hutchence	X	3:52
15.	"Original Sin"	A. Farriss, M. Hutchence	The Swing 1984	4:02
16.	"Devil Inside"	A. Farriss, M. Hutchence	Kick	3:57
17.	"The Gift"	J. Farriss, M. Hutchence	Full Moon, Dirty Hearts 1993	4:03
18.	"By My Side"	A. Farriss, M. Hutchence, Chris Thomas	X	3:06
19.	"Born to Be Wild"	Mars Bonfire	Full Moon, Dirty Hearts (Japanese Edition)	3:50
20.	"Salvation Jane"	A. Farriss		4:41
21.	"Tight"	A. Farriss		3:38

Disc 2 (Bonus content)

No.	Title	Writer(s)	Length
1.	"Mystify" (Live)	A. Farriss, M. Hutchence	3:28
2.	"Suicide Blonde" (Live)	A. Farriss, M. Hutchence	4:06
3.	"New Sensation" (Live)	A. Farriss, M.Hutchence	4:12
4.	"Tight" (The Automator remix)	A. Farriss	4:36
5.	"Precious Heart" (Radio edit)		2:59
6.	"I'm So Crazy" (Radio edit)		3:11
7.	"Suicide Blonde" (Multimedia track)	A. Farriss, M. Hutchence	3:30

== Charts and certifications ==
=== Charts ===
Chart (2002)	Peak position
Austrian Albums (Ö3 Austria)	23
Belgian Albums (Ultratop Flanders)	37
New Zealand Albums (RMNZ)	4
Irish Albums (IRMA)	34
Scottish Albums (Official Charts)	13
Spanish Albums (Promusicae)	75
Swiss Albums (Schweizer Hitparade)	62
UK Albums (Official Charts)	15

=== Certifications ===
Region	Certification	Certified units/sales
Argentina (CAPIF)	Gold	20,000^{^}
Australia (ARIA)	Platinum	70,000^{^}
New Zealand (RMNZ)	Platinum	15,000^{^}
United Kingdom (BPI)	Gold	100,000^{*}
^{*} Sales figures based on certification alone.^{^} Shipments figures based on certification alone.
