= Stay Young =

Stay Young may refer to:

== Songs ==
- "Stay Young" (Gallagher & Lyle song), a song by Gallagher & Lyle, notably covered by Don Williams in 1983
- "Stay Young" (INXS song), a single by INXS from their 1981 album, Underneath the Colours
- "Stay Young" (Oasis song), the B-side to the 1997 single "D'You Know What I Mean?" by Oasis
- "Stay Young", a song by Coloured Stone
- "Stay Young", a song by Maisie Peters, 2019
- "Stay Young", a song by Paris Hilton from Infinite Icon, 2024
- "Stay Young", a song by Strata from Strata Presents The End of the World, 2007
- "Stay Young", a song by Ultrasound from Everything Picture, 1999
- "Stay Young", a song by We the Kings from We the Kings, 2007
- "Stay Young", a song by Green Day from the deluxe edition of their 2024 album Saviors

== Albums ==
- Stay Young 1979–1982, a compilation album by INXS released in 2002
