= The Best of INXS =

Greatest hits album by INXS
- Released: 4 June 2002
- Genre: Rock
- Length: 78:34
- Label: Atlantic/Rhino
- Producer: Mark Opitz, Nile Rodgers, Chris Thomas, INXS, David McLees, Emily Cagan, Karen Ahmed, David Edwards

INXS chronology
Shine Like It Does: The Anthology (1979–1997) (2001)	The Best of INXS (2002)	Stay Young 1979–1982 (2002)

Professional ratings
Review scores
Source	Rating
AllMusic	link
Rolling Stone	4/5 stars

The Best of INXS is a greatest hits album by Australian rock band INXS, released on 4 June 2002 by Atlantic Records and Rhino Entertainment. It featured digitally remastered versions of tracks from previous albums and reached #144 on the US charts, selling more than 373,000 copies since its release. The compilation features most of their hit singles, as well as two previously unreleased tracks, "Salvation Jane" and "Tight". "Salvation Jane" is an outtake taken from the X sessions in 1990; the 2002 remaster of X features the song's original demo. "Tight" was written by songwriter and multi-instrumentalist Andrew Farriss and recorded by the band during the sessions for Welcome to Wherever You Are in 1992. The song was reworked by the remaining members of INXS in 2002 after the death of vocalist Michael Hutchence in 1997. The nearly identical counterpart compilation released in the same year, Definitive INXS, was a moderate chart success in the UK, peaking at #15.

== Track listing ==
An alternative release of this LP re-organises the track listing.

No.	Title	Writer(s)	Length
1.	"Need You Tonight" (Single version)	Andrew Farriss, Michael Hutchence	3:03
2.	"What You Need"	A. Farriss, Hutchence	3:34
3.	"By My Side"	A. Farriss, Hutchence, Chris Thomas	3:04
4.	"Taste It"	A. Farriss, Hutchence	3:24
5.	"New Sensation"	A. Farriss, Hutchence	3:40
6.	"The One Thing"	A. Farriss, Hutchence	3:25
7.	"Disappear"	Jon Farriss, Hutchence	4:07
8.	"Never Tear Us Apart"	A. Farriss, Hutchence	3:02
9.	"Original Sin" (Single version)	A. Farriss, Hutchence	4:01
10.	"Mystify"	A. Farriss, Hutchence	3:18
11.	"This Time"	A. Farriss	3:08
12.	"Suicide Blonde" (Maxi-single version – 7" mix)	A. Farriss, Hutchence	3:50
13.	"Beautiful Girl" (Mendelsohn mix)	A. Farriss	3:09
14.	"The Gift"	J. Farriss, Hutchence	4:03
15.	"Listen Like Thieves"	A. Farriss, Hutchence, Garry Gary Beers	3:46
16.	"Devil Inside" (Maxi-single version – Australian single edit)	A. Farriss, Hutchence	3:56
17.	"Bitter Tears"	A. Farriss, Hutchence	3:51
18.	"Not Enough Time" (Single version – Barcelona LP fade)	A. Farriss, Hutchence	4:19
19.	"Salvation Jane"	A. Farriss	4:43
20.	"Tight" (Dan the Automator remix)	A. Farriss	4:35
21.	"Don't Change"	A. Farriss, Hutchence, Beers, Kirk Pengilly, Tim Farriss, J. Farriss	4:25

=== Limited special edition disc ===
1. "Mystify" Live from America
2. "Suicide Blonde" Live from America
3. "New Sensation" Live from America
4. "Tight" Dan the Automator remix
5. "Precious Heart" Tall Paul vs. INXS – Radio edit
6. "I'm So Crazy" Par-T-One vs. INXS – Radio edit
7. "Suicide Blonde" Music video
8. "Need You Tonight" Music video
9. "Mystify" Music video

== Personnel ==
=== INXS ===
- Michael Hutchence – vocals, production
- Andrew Farriss – keyboards, guitars, production
- Tim Farriss – guitars, bass, production
- Kirk Pengilly – guitar, saxophone, vocals, production
- Garry Gary Beers – bass, production
- Jon Farriss – drums, production

=== Additional musicians ===
- Sunil DeSilva – percussion on "Not Enough Time"
- Deni Hines – backing vocals on "Not Enough Time"
- Casual – rap on "Tight"
- James Morrison – brass section on "Tight"

== Certifications ==
Region	Certification	Certified units/sales
United States (RIAA)	Gold	500,000^{^}
^{^} Shipments figures based on certification alone.
