= Magic Box =

Magic Box may refer to:

== Arts, entertainment and media ==
=== Television ===
- Star TV (Turkish TV channel), formerly "Magic Box"
- 'Magic Box', a programming block on TNT (American TV network)
- The Magic Box (TV show), a 1990s TV show on The Learning Channel
- The Magic Box (TV series), a 2000s TV show on CTV; see List of programs broadcast by CTV and CTV 2
- "The Magic Box", a 2012 TV special on UTV and BBC One Northern Ireland; see Analogue terrestrial television in the United Kingdom
- "A Magic Box", season 1 episode of Grami's Circus Show
- "The Magic Box", 2018 season 1 episode of Single Parents (TV series)
- 'Magic Box', a challenge in the reality TV game show Endurance (TV series)
- "Magic Box", season 3 episode of Pocoyo

=== Film ===
- The Magic Box, a 1951 British movie
- The Magic Box (2002 film), a Tunisian drama film
- Siegfried & Roy: The Magic Box, a 1999 film directed by Brett Leonard
- The Magic Box: The Films of Shirley Clarke. 1927-1986, a boxset of the short films of Shirley Clarke

=== Albums ===
- Magic Box (The Loved Ones album), 1967
- Magic Box (Bel Canto album), 1996
- Magic Box, a 2006 live album featuring Luther Kent

=== Songs ===
- "Magic Boxes (White Man's Dreaming)", 1997 track from the soundtrack album Oscar and Lucinda: Original Motion Picture Soundtrack for the film Oscar and Lucinda (film)
- "Magic Box" (The Loved Ones song), 1967 title track by The Loved Ones off the eponymous album Magic Box
- "Magic Box I" (Bel Canto song), 1996 song by Bel Canto off the album Magic Box
- "Magic Box II" (Bel Canto song), 1996 song by Bel Canto off the album Magic Box
- "Magic Box" (Laurie Berkner song), a 1998 song by Laurie Berkner off the record Buzz, Buzz

=== Games ===
- Magic Boxes (game), 1989 videogame by John Romero
- The Magic Box (Buffy the Vampire Slayer Roleplaying Game), a supplement for the roleplaying game
- Magic boxes, the mystery prize boxes used in the videogame Fantage

=== Other arts, entertainment and media ===
- David Nixon's Magic Box, a 1970s stage magic show

== Devices ==
- Black box or magic box; a device that produces outputs from inputs magically, but whose operation is unknown
- DNA magic box, a machine that performs rapid DNA chemical analysis
- Television or magic box
- Computer or magic box

== Places ==
- Caja Mágica (Spanish: Magic Box), Manzanares Park Tennis Center, Madrid, Spain
- The Magic Box, Academy Cinema, Bristol, England, UK; a former bar

=== Fictional locations ===
- The Magic Box, a store from the TV show Buffy the Vampire Slayer season 5

== People ==
- Gianfranco Zola (born 1966), soccer player nicknamed "Magic Box"
- Magic Box, an Italian singer who performed the 2003 song "If You..."

== Other uses ==
- A box used in stage magic

== See also ==
- Magic (disambiguation)
- Box (disambiguation)
