= If You =

If You may refer to:

- "If You...", a song by Italian singer Magic Box
- "If You" (Big Bang song)
- "If You" (NU'EST W song)
- "If You", a song by Megan McKenna from the album Story of Me
