= Underneath the Colours =

Studio album by INXS
- Released: 19 October 1981
- Recorded: July–August 1981
- Studio: Studios 301; Paradise Studios (Sydney, Australia).
- Genre: Rock
- Length: 38:35
- Label: Deluxe, Mercury
- Producer: Richard Clapton

INXS chronology
INXS (1980)	Underneath the Colours (1981)	INXSIVE (1982)

Singles from Underneath the Colours
- 1. "Stay Young" Released: September 1981; 2. "Night of Rebellion" Released: January 1982; 3. "Underneath the Colours" Released: January 1982

Professional ratings
Review scores
Source	Rating
AllMusic	2.5/5 stars
(The New)Rolling Stone Album Guide	2.5/5 stars

Underneath the Colours is the second studio album by Australian rock band INXS. It was released in Australia on 19 October 1981 on the Deluxe Records label and reached No 15 on the Australian album charts.

== Background ==
In 1981, INXS signed Gary Grant as their tour manager, who then became co-manager a year later. Between touring commitments, the band released their third single in May 1981, "The Loved One", which was a cover of a 1966 song by Australian group The Loved Ones. The song was recorded at Studios 301 in Sydney, produced by Richard Clapton, and peaked in the Top 20.

The success of the single led to Clapton and the band returning to Studios 301 between July and August 1981 to create their second studio album. The album was released on 19 October 1981 and became a hit in Australia peaking at No. 15.

It was with this album that Michael Hutchence's songwriting started to mature and the band started to find a unique sound. Included were political songs and their very first ballad. It was released outside Australia and New Zealand in 1984, as the band were gaining momentum in their success.

Kirk Pengilly said of the album, "It was very difficult for us. We'd toured the first album and then we had to come up with a follow-up. We weren't really prepared for it and I think the album suffered a bit because of that." Alternately, Hutchence said he was very happy with the album: "The first album was a cheapie, but with this one we had time to spend. We had Richard Clapton producing and he was a big help. We looked at things from a straight studio perspective."

The first single from the album was "Stay Young" in October, which reached No 21 on the Australian Singles chart in November, it was followed by "Night of Rebellion" in January 1982. In July 1982, INXS signed a new deal with WEA Australia for releases in Australia, South East Asia, Japan and New Zealand; with sister label Atco Records (a subsidiary of Atlantic Records) for North America and with PolyGram for United Kingdom and the rest of Europe.

The cover is an uncredited linocut by British artist Cyril Power titled Folk Dance.

== Track listing ==
Side one
No.	Title	Writer(s)	Length
1.	"Stay Young"	Andrew Farriss, Michael Hutchence	3:25
2.	"Horizons"	A. Farriss, Hutchence	5:13
3.	"Big Go Go"	Garry Gary Beers, A. Farriss, Jon Farriss, Tim Farriss, Hutchence, Kirk Pengilly	3:12
4.	"Underneath the Colours"	A. Farriss, Hutchence	3:59
5.	"Fair Weather Ahead"	Beers, A. Farriss, J. Farriss, T. Farriss, Hutchence, Pengilly	4:21

Side two
No.	Title	Writer(s)	Length
6.	"Night of Rebellion"	A. Farriss, Hutchence, Pengilly	3:44
7.	"Follow"	Hutchence, Pengilly	3:53
8.	"Barbarian"	Beers, A. Farriss, J. Farriss, T. Farriss, Hutchence, Pengilly	3:00
9.	"What Would You Do"	Beers, A. Farriss, J. Farriss, T. Farriss, Hutchence, Pengilly	3:08
10.	"Just to Learn Again"	Beers, A. Farriss, Hutchence	4:43
Total length:			38:35

== Personnel ==
INXS

- Michael Hutchence – vocals
- Kirk Pengilly – guitars, saxophone, vocals
- Garry Gary Beers – bass
- Jon Farriss – drums, percussion
- Andrew Farriss – keyboards
- Tim Farriss – guitars

Additional musicians

- Keith Casey – percussion (3, 10)
- Karen Ansel – backing vocals (1, 3)
- Dave Mason – backing vocals (1, 3)

Production

- INXS – arrangements
- Richard Clapton – producer
- Alex Vertikoff – engineer
- David Walsh – second engineer
- Paul Ibbotson – mastering at Festival Studios (Sydney, Australia)
- Art '79 – front cover artwork
- Garry Gary Beers – photography
- Jon Farriss – photography
- Tim Farriss – photography

== Charts ==
Chart performance for Underneath the Colours
Chart (1981–1982)	Peak position
Australian Albums (Kent Music Report)	15
