= Niton (disambiguation) =

Niton is a village on the Isle of Wight in England.

Niton may also refer to:

- Niton (element) (symbol "Nt"), obsolete name of the element radon
- Niton, Alberta, Canada; a locality in Yellowhead County
- "Niton (The Reason)", a song by Eric Prydz
