= Just Keep Walking =

Single by INXS

from the album INXS
- Released: October 1980
- Recorded: 1979–1980
- Studio: Trafalgar (Annandale, New South Wales)
- Genre: New wave; pop
- Length: 2:42
- Label: Deluxe
- Songwriters: Garry Gary Beers; Andrew Farriss; Jon Farriss; Tim Farriss; Michael Hutchence; Kirk Pengilly
- Producers: INXS, Duncan McGuire

INXS singles chronology
"Simple Simon" (1980)	"Just Keep Walking" (1980)	"The Loved One" (1981)

"Just Keep Walking" is a song recorded by Australian rock band INXS. Deluxe Records released the song in October 1980 as the only single from their debut studio album INXS. The song reached the 38th place on the Top 40 list and became their first Australian Top 40 hit, earning the band international fame.

== Background ==
The only single from the eponymous album released the same year, it is the song that helped the band launch its international career. By that time, INXS had already had three years of experience and already released the debut single "Simple Simon".

"Just Keep Walking" is also the subject of the group's first music video, shot like a live performance in a minimalist setting: white background and INXS logo on the black floor.

The song has a remixed version in 2001 under the title "I'm So Crazy" by the Italian group Par-T-One.

The B-side is the song "Scratch", which was not released on album until its inclusion in the 2002 compilation album Stay Young 1979–1982.

== Track listing ==
All tracks are written by Garry Gary Beers, Andrew Farriss, Jon Farriss, Tim Farriss, Michael Hutchence, Kirk Pengilly.

No.	Title	Length
1.	"Just Keep Walking"	2:42
2.	"Scratch"	2:10

== Personnel ==
- Garry Gary Beers – bass
- Jon Farriss – drums, vocals
- Tim Farriss – guitar
- Kirk Pengilly – guitar, vocals
- Andrew Farriss – keyboards
- Duncan McGuire – producer
- Michael Hutchence – vocals
