= Woz Not Woz =

Single by Eric Prydz and Steve Angello
- Released: August 18, 2004 (UK); May 17, 2005 (Europe)
- Recorded: 2004
- Studio: Mouseville Studios, Stockholm
- Genre: Funky house
- Length: 3:01
- Label: Cr2 Records; Universal/Capitol
- Songwriter(s): Eric Prydz; Steve Angello; David Weiss; Don Fagenson
- Producer(s): Eric Prydz; Steve Angello; David Was; Don Was

Eric Prydz singles chronology
"Call on Me" (2004)	"Woz Not Woz" (2004)	"Proper Education" (2006)

Steve Angello singles chronology
"Voices" (2004)	"Woz Not Woz" (2005)	"Tell Me Why" (2006)

"Woz Not Woz" is a song by Swedish house music DJs Eric Prydz and Steve Angello. The song was originally released in 2004 as a single through Cr2 Records (the London-based label's second release at the time). The song is an adaptation of "Wheel Me Out" (1980), the first single released by American group Was (Not Was). It was written by founding group members David Weiss (David Was) and Don Fagenson (Don Was).

== Track listings and formats ==
2004 UK 12" vinyl (Cr2 Records – 12C2002)

A. "Woz Not Woz" (Version 2) – 7:07
B. "Woz Not Woz" (Version 1) – 8:07

2004 UK CD maxi single (Cr2 Records – CDC2002)

1. "Woz Not Woz" (Club Mix) – 7:11
2. "Woz Not Woz" (Dub Mix) – 8:14
3. "Woz Not Woz" (Stringapella) – 3:06
4. "Woz Not Woz" (Drums Tools) – 3:02

2004 France 12" vinyl (Full Force Session – FFS 003)

A1. "Woz Not Woz" (Jerry Ropero & Denis The Menace Remix) – 10:15
B1. "Woz Not Woz" (Sandy. W Executive Remix) – 7:13
B2. "Woz Not Woz" (Original Club Mix) – 7:36

2005 German 12" vinyl (Alphabet City – ALPH 0042-6)

A1. "Woz Not Woz" (Club Mix) – 7:06
B1. "Woz Not Woz" (Abysm Remix) – 7:15
B2. "Woz Not Woz" (Horny United Remix) – 6:26

2005 Europe CD maxi single (Alphabet City – 500.0010.3)

1. "Woz Not Woz" (Club Radio Cut) – 3:01
2. "Woz Not Woz" (Club Mix) – 7:08
3. "Woz Not Woz" (Abysm Remix) – 7:15
4. "Woz Not Woz" (Horny United Remix) – 6:26

2005 Limited Edition Collector's 12" (Cr2 Records – 12C2E002)

A01. "Woz Not Woz" (Horny United Remix)
A02. "Woz Not Woz" (Sandy Wilhelm Remix)
B01. "Woz Not Woz" (Jerry Ropero & Dennis The Menace Remix)
B02. "Woz Not Woz" (Abysm Remix)

== Credits and personnel ==
- Writers – Eric Prydz, Steve Angello, David Weiss, Don Fagenson
- Music – David Weiss, Don Fagenson
- Lyrics – David Weiss, Don Fagenson
- Vocals – Kidz on Glass
- Label(s): Cr2 Records
- Publisher(s): EMI / Virgin Music Inc. / Microdot Songs / 1-800-DON-WAS Inc.

Credits adapted from liner notes.

== Chart performance ==
The song first entered the UK Singles Chart at its peak the week of August 21, 2004 (preceding the release of what would later be Prydz's hit single of that year "Call on Me"), becoming the first major charting single for both artists. It achieved additional success in Europe following its re-release in 2005, particularly in France (where it was a club hit for 8 weeks) and the German-language-speaking countries of Germany, Austria, and Switzerland.

=== Weekly charts ===
Chart (2004–2005)	Peak position
Belgium Dance (Ultratop Flanders)	1
Belgium Dance (Ultratop Wallonia)	1
France (SNEP)	50
Germany (GfK)	63
Scotland (OCC)	57
Switzerland (Schweizer Hitparade)	84
UK Dance (OCC)	2
UK Singles (OCC)	55

== Release history ==
Region	Year	Format	Label
United Kingdom	2004	12" vinyl, CD maxi	Cr2 Records
France	2004	12" vinyl	Full Force Sessions
Germany	2005	12" vinyl	Alphabet City
Austria	2005	12" vinyl	Alphabet City
Switzerland	2005	12" vinyl	Alphabet City
Europe	2005	CD maxi	Alphabet City
