= Tether (song) =

2015 single by Eric Prydz & Chvrches

Single by Eric Prydz & Chvrches
- Released: 16 February 2015
- Recorded: 2014
- Length: 3:06
- Label: Pryda; Virgin
- Songwriter(s): Chvrches
- Producer(s): Eric Prydz

Eric Prydz singles chronology
"Liberate" (2014)	"Tether" (2015)	"Generate" (2015)

Chvrches singles chronology
"Get Away" (2014)	"Tether" (2015)	"Leave a Trace" (2015)

"Tether" is a single by Swedish DJ and producer Eric Prydz. It is a reworked version of Scottish electronic band Chvrches' song of the same name. The song was released as a digital download on 16 February 2015. The song was written by Chvrches and produced by Eric Prydz. It peaked at number 107 on the UK Singles Chart.

== Music video ==
A music video to accompany the release of "Tether" was first released onto YouTube on 19 February 2015 at a total length of three minutes and seventeen seconds.

== Chart performance ==
Chart (2015)	Peak position
Belgium (Ultratip Bubbling Under Flanders)	33
UK Singles (Official Charts Company)	107
US Dance/Mix Show Airplay (Billboard)	33

== Release history ==
Region	Date	Format	Label
Sweden	16 February 2015	Digital download	Pryda Recordings
Sweden	5 April 2015	Digital download	Virgin Records
