= Proper Education =

2006 single by Eric Prydz and Pink Floyd

Single by Eric Prydz vs. Floyd
- Released: 24 November 2006
- Length: 3:21 (radio edit); 6:09 (club mix)
- Label: Pryda; Data
- Songwriters: Eric Prydz; Roger Waters
- Producer: Eric Prydz

Eric Prydz singles chronology
"Woz Not Woz" (2005)	"Proper Education" (2006)	"Pjanoo" (2008)

Pink Floyd singles chronology
"Wish You Were Here (Live)" (1995)	"Proper Education" (2007)	"Louder than Words" (2014)

Alternative cover
- CD2 cover

"Proper Education" is a remix of the 1979 song "Another Brick in the Wall, Part II" by Pink Floyd (credited as "Floyd" for the single) by the Swedish DJ and electronic music producer Eric Prydz. It was released in Sweden on 24 November 2006 and in the United Kingdom on 1 January 2007. "Proper Education" reached number two on the UK Singles Chart and topped the US Billboard Hot Dance Airplay chart in 2007. On 8 December 2007, the song received a nomination for Best Remixed Recording at the 2008 Grammy Awards.

== Music video ==
The music video for the song features Daniel Ilabaca escaping school (which connects to the original song's theme) while doing parkour stunts. They sneak into a number of apartments and perform energy efficient tasks, such as replacing lightbulbs with their energy efficient equivalent, turning down thermostats, turning off televisions, putting bricks in toilets (to save water), etc. Finally, they tap into the apartment complex's power grid and power down the whole building, before re-lighting some of the apartments so that the words "SWITCH OFF" appear in lights on the side of the building. The video ends with the words "you don't need an education to save the planet". The video was shot on the Broadwater Farm Estate in Tottenham.

== Track listings ==
Swedish 12-inch single

A. "Proper Education"
B. "The Dub"

Dutch CD single

1. "Proper Education" (radio edit)
2. "Proper Education" (club mix)
3. "Proper Education" (Sebastian Ingrosso)
4. "Proper Education" (Sébastien Léger remix)

Spanish 12-inch single

A1. "Proper Education" (original) – 6:09
B1. "Proper Education" (dub) – 8:38
B2. "Proper Education" (Sebastian Ingrosso remix) – 8:59

UK CD1

1. "Proper Education" (radio edit)
2. "Proper Education" (club mix)

UK CD2

1. "Proper Education" (radio edit)
2. "Proper Education" (club mix)
3. "Call on Me" (Henrik B remix)
4. "Proper Education" (Sebastian Ingrosso remix)
5. Extended interactive CD-ROM

UK 12-inch single

A. "Proper Education" (club mix)
B. "Proper Education" (Sebastian Ingrosso remix)

US and Australian CD single

1. "Proper Education" (radio edit)
2. "Proper Education" (club mix)
3. "Proper Education" (Sebastian Ingrosso remix)

== Charts ==
=== Weekly charts ===
Chart (2006–2007)	Peak position
Australia (ARIA)	20
Australian Club Chart (ARIA)	1
Australian Dance (ARIA)	3
Austria (Ö3 Austria Top 40)	20
Belgium (Ultratop 50 Flanders)	2
Belgium (Ultratop 50 Wallonia)	12
CIS Airplay (TopHit)	4
Czech Republic Airplay (ČNS IFPI)	6
Denmark (Tracklisten)	3
Europe (Eurochart Hot 100)	2
Finland (Suomen virallinen lista)	1
France (SNEP)	10
Germany (GfK)	4
Hungary (Dance Top 40)	3
Hungary (Rádiós Top 40)	2
Ireland (IRMA)	9
Italy (FIMI)	11
Netherlands (Dutch Top 40)	3
Netherlands (Single Top 100)	4
Romania (Romanian Top 100)	9
Russia Airplay (TopHit)	7
Scotland Singles (OCC)	2
Slovakia Airplay (ČNS IFPI)	29
Spain (Promusicae)	4
Sweden (Sverigetopplistan)	7
Switzerland (Schweizer Hitparade)	12
UK Singles (OCC)	2
UK Dance (OCC)	1
Ukraine Airplay (TopHit)	66
US Dance Club Songs (Billboard)	29
US Dance/Mix Show Airplay (Billboard)	1

Chart (2025)	Peak position
Moldova Airplay (TopHit)	99

=== Year-end charts ===
Chart (2006)	Position
Hungary (Dance Top 40)	97

Chart (2007)	Position
Australian Club Chart (ARIA)	17
Australian Dance (ARIA)	23
Belgium (Ultratop 50 Flanders)	43
Belgium (Ultratop 50 Wallonia)	54
CIS Airplay (TopHit)	24
Europe (Eurochart Hot 100)	27
France (SNEP)	89
Germany (Media Control)	51
Hungary (Dance Top 40)	15
Hungary (Rádiós Top 40)	47
Netherlands (Dutch Top 40)	35
Netherlands (Single Top 100)	72
Russia Airplay (TopHit)	20
Sweden (Sverigetopplistan)	68
Switzerland (Schweizer Hitparade)	58
UK Singles (OCC)	66
US Hot Dance Airplay (Billboard)	17

=== Decade-end charts ===
Chart (2000–2009)	Position
Russia Airplay (TopHit)	113

== Certifications ==
Region	Certification	Certified units/sales
Denmark (IFPI Danmark)	Gold	4,000^{^}
^{^} Shipments figures based on certification alone.

== Release history ==
Region	Date	Format(s)	Label(s)	Ref.
Sweden	24 November 2006	12-inch picture disc	Pryda; Data	
Netherlands	22 December 2006	CD	Spinnin'	
United Kingdom	1 January 2007	12-inch vinyl	Data; Positiva; Ministry of Sound	
United States	30 January 2007	Digital download	Ultra	
Australia	5 March 2007	CD	Ministry of Sound	
United States	6 March 2007	Maxi-CD	Ultra	
