= INXS (album) =

Studio album by INXS
- Released: 13 October 1980
- Recorded: 1979–1980
- Studio: Trafalgar (Annandale, New South Wales)
- Genre: New wave; ska; pop
- Length: 33:23
- Label: Deluxe, Mercury
- Producer: Duncan McGuire, INXS

INXS chronology
INXS (1980)	Underneath the Colours (1981)

Singles from INXS
- 1. "Just Keep Walking" Released: October 1980

INXS is the debut studio album by Australian rock band INXS, released on 13 October 1980, by Deluxe Records. The album showcases a new wave and ska style the band soon abandoned in favor of post-punk, and later, pop rock. INXS recorded the album in midnight to dawn sessions during 1979 to 1980 after performing, on average, two gigs a day at local pubs around Sydney. All tracks are credited to band members, who co-produced the album with Duncan McGuire (ex-Ayers Rock).

The album was exclusive to Australia and New Zealand for four years, with an international release not coming until 1984. INXS peaked at No. 27 on the Kent Music Report albums chart, and spawned the single, "Just Keep Walking" (September 1980), which became their first top 40 hit in the country.

== Background ==
The Farriss Brothers, an Australian progressive rock band, formed in 1977 with a line-up of Garry Gary Beers (bass guitar and double bass); brothers Andrew (keyboards and guitar), Jon (drums, keyboards) and Tim Farriss (lead guitar); Michael Hutchence (lead vocals); and Kirk Pengilly (guitar, saxophone and backing vocals).

The band changed its name to INXS, a phonetic play on "in excess", at the request of Gary Morris, manager of pub rock band Midnight Oil, and transitioned to a ska and punk influenced sound. The band performed its first song with the name on 1 September 1979 at the Ocean Beach Hotel in Umina, then signed a five-album record deal with a Sydney independent label, Deluxe Records, run by Michael Browning, a former manager of AC/DC.

INXS released their first single, "Simple Simon"/"We Are the Vegetables", in Australia and France in May 1980. The single had its debut TV performance on Simon Townsend's Wonder World.

== Recording ==
The self-titled debut album was recorded at Trafalgar Studios in Annandale, Sydney. It was co-produced by the band and Duncan McGuire (ex-Ayers Rock), with all songs attributed to the entire band, at the insistence of Murphy. Deluxe gave them a budget of $10,000 to record the album, so to keep within the budget they had to record from midnight to dawn, usually after doing one or more performances earlier that night. Later Hutchence recalled working on INXS:

I'm not a great fan of the first album. It's naïve and kinda cute, almost. It's these young guys struggling for a sound. All I can hear is what was going to happen later and it's probably an interesting album because of that. "Just Keep Walking" was the first time we thought we'd written a song. And that became an anthem around town. It's funny, I remember kids in pubs saying it and hearing it on the radio the first time. We'd never heard that before.

Tim Farriss remarked that the lyric "Shove it, brother / Just keep walking" from the song "sort of summed up our attitude. We took on an 'angry young man' status because we were working our guts out and still starving."

== Musical style ==
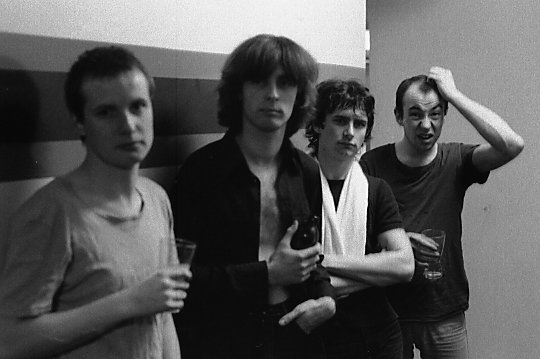
XTC, an English rock band compared to INXS

INXS is primarily a new wave, ska, and pop album, that shifts the focus among keyboards, sax and guitar during its 33 minute and 23 second run time. Stephen Thomas Erlewine of AllMusic described the album as a "variation on droning new wave synth pop," with only traces of R&B and dance that defined the band's later work.

Alicia Kennedy of Stereogum summarized the ten songs as "ska-infected", with "Doctor", "Jumping" and "Body Language" best demonstrating the sound, while opener "On A Bus" leans towards pop rock and "Newsreel Babies" is closer to new wave. Christopher Thelen of The Daily Vault compared the album to the early works of XTC, another band who combined new wave and Jamaican ska beats, but is less heavy on the latter.

The band's second studio album, Underneath the Colors (1981), while also influenced by post-punk, ska and new wave, is the beginning of their transition to rock music, with a sound that leaned more toward punk-funk, and is seen as setting the band up for mainstream success. This success came on the band's third studio album and first internationally, Shabooh Shoobah (1982), which ditched ska entirely in favor of post-punk.

== Release ==
INXS was released on 13 October 1980, by Deluxe Records. The album, exclusive to Australia and New Zealand, was an instant success in both countries, peaking in the Top 30 of the Kent Music Report in the former, and was certified gold (selling over 35,000 units) by the ARIA, but it took a number of years to do so. Its first and only single, "Just Keep Walking", was released the same month. The single, exclusive to Australia and the United Kingdom, proved to be their first Top 40 single in the former, but was unsuccessful in the latter, a theme for the band in the early 1980s.

These early records demonstrated their new wave/ska/pop style, and were followed by near constant touring with almost 300 shows during 1981 as the band developed their status as a live act. In 1981, they signed Gary Grant as their tour manager, who then became co-manager a year later. Between touring commitments, the band released their third single in May 1981, "The Loved One", which was a cover of a 1966 song by Australian group The Loved Ones. The song was recorded at Studios 301 in Sydney; it was produced by Richard Clapton and peaked in the Top 20.

After the success of the band's third and fourth albums, Shabooh Shoobah (1982) and The Swing (1984) respectively, their self-titled debut album and Underneath the Colors were released outside Australia and New Zealand in 1984, by Atco Records. The four albums had local chart success, but also appeared on international charts, with INXS peaking at No. 164 on the Billboard 200. This allowed the band to find worldwide success on their fifth album, Listen Like Thieves (1985), peaking at No. 48 in the United Kingdom. While its reviews were mixed, this was a first for INXS, who had been ignored in the country.

== Critical reception ==
Professional ratings
Review scores
Source	Rating
AllMusic	2/5 stars
(The New)Rolling Stone Album Guide	2.5/5 stars
The Daily Vault	C+

AllMusic's Stephen Thomas Erlewine was not impressed by INXS "playing a competent but unremarkable variation on droning new wave synth pop," and while Hutchence "already exuded a powerful vocal charisma," the album is only worthwhile when hinting at the "R&B and dance roots that would form the basis of their biggest hits."

The Daily Vault's Christopher Thelen observed "a group not quite certain of where they wanted to go musically" on the album, and contrary to AllMusic's review, feels Hutchence's performance is a mixed bag. Despite this, he feels comparisons to the band's later work, such as 1985's Listen Like Thieves and 1987's Kick, is unfair, and adds "it does show signs of promise," but loses momentum by the end, with "Doctor" being particularly bad.

Trouser Press's Ira Robbins declared the album is "dull rock that sounds like a less musical Joe Jackson or a no-soul Graham Parker," as the band struggles to write music appealing to an American audience. Robbins is also indifferent to 1981's Underneath the Colors, with its "underwhelming songs" and poorly mixed drums, but confesses the audio quality is "much better." Robbins opined 1984's The Swing is the first INXS album of "real significance."

Stereogum ranked INXS in tenth place on their list "INXS Albums From Worst To Best" with Alicia Kennedy describing the album as "unbalanced" and "ska-infected" as Hutchence gets comfortable with his voice." She wrote "he's often doing a very campy, Adam Ant–type accent" but there are good moments, such as "In Vain" and "Learn To Smile"

== Track listing ==
All tracks are written by Garry Gary Beers, Andrew Farriss, Jon Farriss, Tim Farriss, Michael Hutchence & Kirk Pengilly

Side one
No.	Title	Length
1.	"On a Bus"	3:49
2.	"Doctor"	2:37
3.	"Just Keep Walking"	2:43
4.	"Learn to Smile"	4:55
5.	"Jumping"	3:21

Side two
No.	Title	Length
6.	"In Vain"	4:26
7.	"Roller Skating"	2:47
8.	"Body Language"	2:05
9.	"Newsreel Babies"	2:41
10.	"Wishy Washy"	3:51
Total length:		33:23

== Personnel ==
Personnel taken from INXS liner notes.

INXS

- Michael Hutchence – vocals
- Tim Farriss – guitar
- Kirk Pengilly – saxophone, vocals, guitar
- Garry Gary Beers – bass, vocals
- Jon Farriss – drums, vocals
- Andrew Farriss – keyboards

Production details

- Producer – Duncan McGuire, INXS
- Engineer – Duncan McGuire
- Studios – Trafalgar Studios, Annandale, New South Wales
  - Mixing studio – A.T.A. Studios

Artwork

- Cover art – Gecko Graphics, Noël Coward

== Charts ==
Chart performance for INXS
Chart (1980–1981)	Peak position
Australian Albums (Kent Music Report)	27
Chart (1984)	Peak position
US Billboard 200	164
