= Liberate (Eric Prydz song) =

Single by Eric Prydz

from the album Opus
- Released: 21 March 2014
- Recorded: 2014
- Genre: Vocal trance; tribal house
- Length: 6:44
- Label: Pryda; Virgin
- Songwriters: Eric Prydz; Tom Havelock
- Producer: Eric Prydz

Eric Prydz singles chronology
"Every Day" (2012)	"Liberate" (2014)	"Tether" (2015)

"Liberate" is a single by Swedish DJ and producer Eric Prydz. The song was released as a digital download on 21 March 2014 as the second single from his debut studio album Opus (2016). The song was written by Eric Prydz and Tom Cane. It peaked at number 71 on the UK Singles Chart. The song was featured in the opening scene and soundtrack of Forza Horizon 2 in Horizon Bass Arena.

== Music video ==
A music video to accompany the release of "Liberate" was first released onto YouTube on 12 June 2014 at a total length of three minutes and three seconds. As of April 2016, it has received over three million views.

== Track listing ==
Digital download
No.	Title	Length
1.	"Liberate"	6:44

Remixes
No.	Title	Length
1.	"Liberate" (Lane 8 remix)	5:14
2.	"Liberate" (Matrix & Futurebound remix)	4:48
3.	"We Are Mirage" (vs. Empire of the Sun)	6:19

== Charts ==
Chart (2014)	Peak position
Belgium (Ultratip Bubbling Under Flanders)	50
UK Singles (OCC)	71
US Hot Dance/Electronic Songs (Billboard)	37
US Dance Club Songs (Billboard)	28
US Dance/Mix Show Airplay (Billboard)	14

== Release history ==
Region	Date	Format	Label
Sweden	21 March 2014	Digital download	Pryda
Sweden	3 June 2014	Digital download	Virgin
