= Night of Rebellion =

Single by INXS

from the album Underneath the Colours
- Released: January 1982
- Recorded: July–August 1981
- Studio: Studios 301, Paradise Studios (Sydney, Australia)
- Genre: Rockabilly
- Length: 3:29
- Label: Deluxe
- Songwriters: Andrew Farriss; Michael Hutchence; Kirk Pengilly
- Producers: Andrew Farriss; Richard Clapton

INXS singles chronology
"Stay Young" (1981)	"Night of Rebellion" (1982)	"Underneath the Colours" (1982)

"Night of Rebellion" is a song recorded by Australian rock band INXS. Deluxe released the song in January 1982 as the second single from their studio album Underneath the Colours (1981). The song was written by Andrew Farriss, Michael Hutchence, and Kirk Pengilly, and produced by Andrew Farriss and Richard Clapton.

== Releases ==
The song was also included in the following albums: Stay Young 1979–1982 and The INXS Collection 1980-1993. "Night of Rebellion" was only released in Australia and was not as successful as its predecessor single "Stay Young", failing to appear in the charts.

The B-side includes the song "Prehistoria", an instrumental track composed by Kirk Pengilly and produced by Andrew Farriss. The track features loads of dinosaur and bird noises in the background. In New Zealand, the single "Underneath the Colors" was released with the same B-side containing "Night of Rebellion".

== Reception ==
John Teerds of The Age stated that "Night of Rebellion" is a "pacey song with a good chorus and leads into a side with the emphasis on rockier numbers" while Jon O'Brien of Classic Pop called it a "rockabilly toe-tapper."

== Track listing ==
7" single track listing

No.	Title	Writer(s)	Length
1.	"Night of Rebellion"	Andrew Farriss, Michael Hutchence, Kirk Pengilly	3:29
2.	"Prehistoria"	Kirk Pengilly	3:54
