= Opus (instrumental) =

Single by Eric Prydz

from the album Opus
- Released: 27 July 2015
- Recorded: 2015
- Genre: Progressive house
- Length: 9:03
- Label: Pryda; Virgin
- Songwriter: Eric Prydz
- Producer: Eric Prydz

Eric Prydz singles chronology
"Generate" (2015)	"Opus" (2015)	"Breathe" (2015)

"Opus" is an instrumental by Swedish DJ and producer Eric Prydz. It was released as a digital download on 27 July 2015 as the fourth single from his debut studio album Opus (2016). The instrumental was written and produced by Eric Prydz and peaked at number three in Belgium.

"Opus" is widely considered to be Eric Prydz' masterpiece.

== Composition ==
"Opus" is an instrumental house track set to the F♯ minor key at a tempo of 126 beats per minute. It starts as a set of electronic synths set at 31.5 BPM and gradually builds up to a progressive house track as it continues to accelerate to 126 BPM in a range of three minutes and 42 seconds.

== Reactions ==
In an article titled This Video of Confused Ibiza Clubbers Is an Ode to the Beautiful Disappointment of Life on the website Vice, Angus Harrison takes a philosophical approach to an Ibiza nightclub video where Maceo Plex plays the Four Tet remix of Opus to a bewildered crowd. Although Angus comments that he likes both versions, he feels like the Four Tet remix is superior because it lacks the standard drop that is, in his view, too common and too formulaic.

== Track listing ==
Digital download
No.	Title	Length
1.	"Opus"	9:03
2.	"Opus (Four Tet Remix)"	10:00

== Chart performance ==
Chart (2015)	Peak position
Belgium (Ultratop 50 Flanders)	3
Belgium (Ultratip Bubbling Under Wallonia)	12

== Release history ==
Region	Date	Format	Label
Sweden	27 July 2015	Digital download	Pryda
Sweden	17 August 2015	Digital download	Virgin

== Track history ==
Opus was first played as the finale track for Prydz's 2015 set at EDC Las Vegas. In just over a month after first play, the song was released on Beatport. It has been played as the penultimate track in all seven EPIC 4.0 sets thus far.
