= Tight (song) =

Single by INXS

from the album The Best of INXS
- Released: October 2002
- Recorded: 1992
- Genre: Rock
- Length: 3:38
- Label: Mercury
- Songwriter: Andrew Farriss
- Producer: Mark Opitz

INXS singles chronology
"I'm So Crazy" (2002)	"Tight" (2002)	"One of My Kind" (2002)

"Tight" is the only single released from The Best of INXS album by INXS. The song was written by Andrew Farriss and recorded by the band during the sessions for Welcome to Wherever You Are in 1992.

According to the liner notes from the UK album release, the song had been originally intended for Tom Jones to sing on. However, following Hutchence's death in 1997, the track was reworked by the rest of the band in 2002.

== B-sides ==
A number of different mixes of "Tight" were available on European, Australian and US editions of the CD.

== Video ==
The video for "Tight" was a tribute montage, showing video and live footage of Michael Hutchence and the rest of the band.

== Track listings ==
European CD single Mercury 063 885–2

1. Tight (Remixed By Randy Nicklaus) 3:38
2. Tight (Thick Dick Vocal) 7:50
3. Tight (Dino Lenny Mix) 7:17
4. Tight (Dan The Automator Mix) 4:20 (4:35)

== Charts ==
Chart (2002)	Peak position
Australia (ARIA Charts)	80
Netherlands	93
