= Pjanoo =

2008 single by Eric Prydz

Single by Eric Prydz

from the album Eric Prydz Presents Pryda
- Released: 8 August 2008
- Recorded: 2006
- Genre: Progressive house
- Length: 2:37 (radio edit); 7:31 (club mix)
- Label: Pryda; Data; Ultra
- Songwriter: Eric Prydz
- Producer: Eric Prydz

Eric Prydz singles chronology
"Proper Education" (2006)	"Pjanoo" (2008)	"Niton (The Reason)" (2011)

"Pjanoo" (pronounced [ˈpjɑ̌ːnʊ]) is a keyboard-based house track by Swedish DJ and producer Eric Prydz. "Pjanoo" peaked at number six on the Swedish Singles Chart. Outside Sweden, "Pjanoo" peaked within the top ten of the charts in various other European countries, most notably the United Kingdom, where it peaked at number two on the UK Singles Chart behind Katy Perry's "I Kissed a Girl", topped the UK Dance Chart for ten non-consecutive weeks and received moderate airplay amongst British radio stations, being heavily used by BBC Radio 1 in advertisements for their "Radio 1 Big Weekend" and "Weekend in Ibiza" events.

== Background and release ==
Professional ratings
Review scores
Source	Rating
Digital Spy	3/5 stars

The song has been on promotional release since 17 March 2008 with Eric Prydz's own label, Pryda, with a limited number of 12" pressings available on special order. The song was released on 8 August 2008 by Ministry of Sound's Imprint Label, Data Records.

Prydz stated: "I played it in a club in northern UK in 2006. Didn't get the reaction I thought I would, so I didn't play it for years until I found the CD while playing at 'Ambassadeur' club in Stockholm. Played it for fun again and it went off. Someone filmed it and it ended up on YouTube."

British drum and bass producer High Contrast made a successful drum and bass remix of "Pjanoo" which was released by Data Records on 26 August 2008, with a track length of 7:43.

Despite showing overall resentment towards Prydz, Pitchfork nonetheless conceded that the song was "one of the year's best dance tracks".

== Music video ==
A cowboy in the Old West has a fistful of dollars but he cannot find a drink anywhere because the temperature is over 40 °C (104 °F). He finds an old pub named Pjanoo, and goes into the pub to find a drink. Then an old piano plays by itself, and the cowboy finds two shrunken Native Americans who provide a rain dance, causing rain to fall very heavily. A water tap has water running and the cowboy runs to the tap to have a drink and then runs out of the pub.

== Formats and track listing ==
12″ Vinyl Promo (Pryda 11)

1. "Pjanoo"
2. "F12"

CD maxi

1. "Pjanoo" (Radio Edit) – 2:37
2. "Pjanoo" (Club Mix) – 7:31
3. "Pjanoo" (High Contrast Remix) – 7:04
4. "Pjanoo" (Afterlife Mix) – 5:38
5. "Pjanoo" (Fred Falke Mix) – 6:24
6. "Pjanoo" (Guy J Remix) – 7:43

CD single

1. "Pjanoo" (Radio Edit) – 2:37
2. "Pjanoo" (Afterlife Radio Edit) – 2:50

iTunes Single

1. "Pjanoo" (Radio Edit) – 2:37
2. "Pjanoo" (Dana Bergquist and Peder G Remix) – 9:03

Free Download (2019)

1. "Pjanoo" (Lucas & Steve Remix) – 3:16

== Charts ==
=== Weekly charts ===
Chart (2008–2009)	Peak position
Austria (Ö3 Austria Top 40)	22
Belgium (Ultratop 50 Flanders)	8
Belgium (Ultratop 50 Wallonia)	14
CIS Airplay (TopHit)	43
Czech Republic Airplay (ČNS IFPI)	9
Europe (European Hot 100 Singles)	7
Euro Digital Song Sales (Billboard)	2
France (SNEP)	21
Germany (GfK)	34
Hungary (Dance Top 40)	23
Ireland (IRMA)	7
Netherlands (Dutch Top 40)	4
Netherlands (Single Top 100)	3
Russia Airplay (TopHit)	29
Scottish Singles Sales (Official Charts)	5
Spain (Promusicae)	14
Sweden (Sverigetopplistan)	6
Switzerland (Schweizer Hitparade)	31
UK Dance (Official Charts)	1
UK Singles (Official Charts)	2

=== Year-end charts ===
2008 year-end chart performance for "Pjanoo"
Chart (2009)	Position
Belgium (Ultratop 50 Flanders)	58
CIS (TopHit)	196
Europe (European Hot 100 Singles)	68
Hungary (Dance Top 40)	77
Netherlands (Dutch Top 40)	19
Netherlands (Single Top 100)	44
Russia Airplay (TopHit)	184
UK Singles (OCC)	75

2009 year-end chart performance for "Pjanoo"
Chart (2009)	Position
Russia Airplay (TopHit)	151

== Certifications ==
Region	Certification	Certified units/sales
New Zealand (RMNZ)	Gold	15,000^{‡}
United Kingdom (BPI)	Platinum	600,000^{‡}
^{‡} Sales+streaming figures based on certification alone.

== In popular culture ==
- Used frequently as an anthem at sports events, specifically during halftime of Knicks games in Madison Square Garden.
- Heard in the nightclub in the episode "Night Out In London" of the British sitcom The Inbetweeners.
- Mixed with the songs "Shout" by Tears for Fears and "Somebody Told Me" by The Killers in the video game DJ Hero.
- The Club mix version was used in the first trailer for the video game Grand Theft Auto: The Ballad of Gay Tony, and is available on the in-game radio station Vladivostok FM.
- The Cascada song "Fever" has parts loosely based upon "Pjanoo".
- Used by the BBC in television advertisements for Sport Relief 2010.
- Used by Sky Sports as the theme for their coverage of International One Day Cricket.
- A sample is used in short clips of the German TV magazine stern TV.
- It was heard on an episode of British sitcom Coming of Age.
- Piano riff is used in Blank & Jones Remix of "I Don't Want to Be a Hero" by Johnny Hates Jazz.
- Used in the 2020 Summer Olympics Weightlifting.

== Samples ==
The main melody was sampled in the 2013 song Rollercoaster by Justin Bieber. The main rhythm was sampled in the intro of the 2020 song Hypnotized Purple Disco Machine and Sophie and the Giants.
