= Niton (The Reason) =

Single by Eric Prydz
- Released: 6 February 2011
- Recorded: 2010
- Genre: House
- Length: 2:45
- Label: Ministry of Sound
- Songwriters: Eric Prydz; Jan Burton
- Producer: Eric Prydz

Eric Prydz singles chronology
"Pjanoo" (2008)	"Niton (The Reason)" (2011)	"Every Day" (2012)

"Niton (The Reason)" is a single by Swedish DJ and producer, Eric Prydz. It was released by digital download on 6 February 2011 on Ministry of Sound. The music video was uploaded to YouTube on 9 December 2010. On 13 February 2011 the song entered the UK Singles Chart at number 45.

== Critical reception ==
Robert Copsey of Digital Spy gave the song a positive review stating:

Nobody does elusive DJ/producer better than Eric Prydz. Not only does he take yonks between ~~albums~~ singles, but he also goes by no fewer than nine separate monikers - our favourite being the oh-so macho 'Dukes of Sluca'. However, three years after his hypnotic instrumental hit 'Pjanoo', Prydz is returning under his familiar guise, seemingly eager to regain his place amidst today's Eurodance boffs.

After beginning in jangly electronic fashion, 'Niton' soon becomes a suitably uplifting techno-house rocket powered by a piano riff not too dissimilar to 'Pjanoo's'. Thankfully, the addition of bassy synths, thrilling electronic whooshes and surprisingly thoughtful lyrics ensure that this not only sounds bang-on-trend - but, just as importantly, nothing like a certain Gallic knob-twiddler with a very public affection for party jams.

== Track listing ==
Digital download
No.	Title	Length
1.	"Niton (The Reason)" (Radio Edit)	2:45
2.	"Niton (The Reason)" (Club Mix)	5:36
3.	"Niton (The Reason)" (Sigma Remix)	6:06
4.	"Niton (The Reason)" (Pryda 82 Mix)	4:27
5.	"Niton (The Reason)" (Treasure Fingers Epicwave Remix)	6:24
6.	"Niton (The Reason)" (Original Mix)	8:05

CD single
No.	Title	Length
1.	"Niton (The Reason)" (Radio Edit)	2:43
2.	"Niton (The Reason)" (Extended Mix)	5:34

== Chart performance ==
Chart (2011)	Peak position
Belgium (Ultratip Bubbling Under Flanders)	18
Germany (Media Control AG)	66
Netherlands (Single Top 100)	82
UK Dance (Official Charts)	7
UK Singles (The Official Charts Company)	45

== Release history ==
Region	Date	Format	Label
United Kingdom	6 February 2011	Digital download	Ministry of Sound
