= Magic Box (The Loved Ones album) =

Studio album by The Loved Ones
- Released: October 1967
- Recorded: 1966–1967
- Studio: Armstrong Studios, Melbourne, Australia
- Genre: Rock
- Label: W&G Records

The Loved Ones chronology
The Loved Ones (EP) (1966)	Magic Box (1967)	Live On Blueberry Hill (1987)

Singles from Magic Box
- 1. "Sad Dark Eyes"/"The Woman I Love" Released: February 1967; 2. "A Love Like Ours"/"The Lovely Car" Released: April 1967; 3. "Love Song"/"Magic Box" Released: August 1967

Magic Box (also known by its cover title as The Loved Ones' Magic Box) is the debut and sole studio album from Australian rock band The Loved Ones.

== History ==
The group began work on the album in 1967. Despite having several national hits, their record label W&G Records would not allow the band to record in state-of-the art 4-track facilities. In August, the band would self-finance their own 4-track recording session in Sydney. These tapes were rejected by W&G, who thought the recording levels were too high and shelved the tracks altogether, preferring to record the band at the same sound level as a string quartet.

The band would disband after a disastrous two-week tour of Perth, where the promoters disappeared with the money. Magic Box was released shortly after using a combination of recently recorded songs, previously released singles and unreleased studio warm-ups ("Shake Rattle And Roll" and "I Want You To Love Me").

=== Releases and mastering issues ===
The album was released in both mono and stereo by W&G Records in 1967 on both LP and reel to reel stereo tape. The album remained a popular seller and was reissued in stereo by Astor Records in 1977.

The album was reissued in 1985 on Glenn A. Baker's label Raven Records with a different track order and bonus tracks. However, when the album was remastered, only the left hand channel of the stereo master was used. This means some instruments and an intro to 'Sad Dark Eyes' (an electric piano in the right hand channel) are missing on the Raven Records release. The 1995 Karussell compact disc uses the Raven Records master as its source, meaning the true stereo or mono version of Magic Box has never been released on compact disc or reissued to vinyl since 1977. Both CD reissues included a Wild Cherries rehearsal take of 'Without You', which has been incorrectly attributed to the Loved Ones.

In 2019, the album was reissued for Record Store Day in hot pink coloured vinyl. While the release restores the songs to their original 1967 track listing, it still uses the Raven master with the missing right channel.

== Reception ==
Professional ratings
Review scores
Source	Rating
Everybody's	mixed
Allmusic	4.5/5 stars

The album received mixed contemporary reviews, criticizing the production and that the selection of songs did not represent the band's sound: "...50 percent of it harks back to the jazz scene of the [19]30s, and through it runs a silver thread of genius. Pity."

Though Allmusic gave the album a 4.5-star rating, writer Richie Unterberger said: "The rest of the material is usually less fearsome and innovative, though much of it still carries an air of subdued menace."

The album was included in the 2010 book 100 Best Australian Albums.

== Track listings ==
=== Original 1967 LP release ===
==== Side A ====
No.	Title	Writer(s)	Length
1.	"The Magic Box"	Gerry Humphreys, Rob Lovett, Danny De Lacy, Gavin Anderson, Treva Richards	1:58
2.	"Shake, Rattle & Roll"	Charles Calhoun	3:14
3.	"More Than Love"	Humphreys, Lovett, De Lacy, Anderson, Kim Lynch, Richards	2:09
4.	"Everlovin' Man"	Humphreys, Lovett, De Lacy, Anderson, Lynch, Richards	2:12
5.	"Blueberry Hill"	Al Lewis, Larry Stock, Vincent Rose	2:38
6.	"Love Song"	Humphreys, Lovett, De Lacy, Anderson, Richards	2:12

==== Side B ====
No.	Title	Writer(s)	Length
1.	"A Love Like Ours"	Humphreys, Lovett, De Lacy, Anderson, Lynch, Richards	2.10
2.	"The Woman I Love"	Humphreys, Lovett, De Lacy, Anderson, Lynch, Richards	3:14
3.	"I Want You To Love Me"	Muddy Waters	2:42
4.	"The Loverly Car"	Humphreys, Lovett, De Lacy, Anderson, Lynch, Richards	1:56
5.	"Sad Dark Eyes"	Humphreys, Lovett, De Lacy, Anderson, Lynch, Richards	2:14
6.	"The Loved One"	Humphreys, Lovett, Ian H. Clyne	2:45

=== Reissues ===
The Raven Records reissue and subsequent reissues have a mastering error where only the left channel of the stereo mix was used and panned mono.

==== 1985 Raven reissue ====
No.	Title	Writer(s)	Length
1.	"The Loved One"		2.45
2.	"Everlovin' Man"		2:08
3.	"Sad Dark Eyes" (Faulty stereo. Missing right channel and 7 seconds of the electric piano intro.)		2.14
4.	"A Love Like Ours"		2:10
5.	"Love Song"		2:12
6.	"Blueberry Hill"		2.38
7.	"Shake, Rattle & Roll"		3:14
8.	"This Is Love" (Bonus track from the "Blueberry Hill" EP)	Ian H. Clyne	2:25
9.	"Magic Box"		1.58
10.	"More Than Love"		2:09
11.	"The Woman I Love"		1:58
12.	"The Loverly Car"		1:56
13.	"I Want You To Love Me"		2:45
14.	"(I'm No Good) Without You (Rehearsal)" (this track is actually by the Wild Cherries NOT the Loved Ones)		3.47
15.	"Everlovin' Man (Live at Festival Hall, Melbourne, April 23, 1967)"		2:08
16.	"Ongo Bongo Man" (Gerry & The Joy Band)
17.	"Rave On" (Gerry & The Joy Band)
18.	"Oh Lonesome Me" (Gerry & The Joy Band)
19.	"My Name Is Earl" (Gerry & The Joy Band)

==== 1995 Karussell reissue ====
No.	Title	Length
1.	"The Loved One"	2.45
2.	"Everlovin' Man"	2:08
3.	"Sad Dark Eyes"	2.14
4.	"A Love Like Ours"	2:10
5.	"Love Song"	2:12
6.	"Blueberry Hill"	2.38
7.	"Shake, Rattle & Roll"	3:14
8.	"This Is Love"	2:25
9.	"Magic Box"	1.58
10.	"More Than Love"	2:09
11.	"The Woman I Love"	1:58
12.	"The Loverly Car"	1:56
13.	"I Want You To Love Me"	2:45
14.	"(I'm No Good) Without You (Rehearsal)" (this track is actually by the Wild Cherries NOT the Loved Ones)	3.47
15.	"Everlovin' Man (Live at Festival Hall, Melbourne, April 1967)"	2:08
16.	"Sad Dark Eyes (Live at Festival Hall, Melbourne, April 1967)"	2:25
17.	"The Loved One (Live at Festival Hall, Melbourne, April 1967)"	3:32

== Personnel ==
- Gerry Humphrys – vocals
- Rob Lovett – guitar, bass
- Ian Clyne - electric piano, organ
- Kim Lynch - bass
- Gavin Anderson – drums
- Treva Richards – electric piano
- Danny DeLacey – guitar
