= In Records (Australia) =

In Records was an Australian record label of the 1960s. It was a subsidiary label of the Melbourne-based W&G Records company for their pop releases, which was set up in the mid-1960s. It is best known for the recordings by renowned 1960s beat group, the Loved Ones. In 1967, In Records released a 7-inch record by The Elois (pronounced Elys), "I'm a Man" / "By My Side". Other artists on their roster were the Blackout, the Chessmen, Johnny Dark, John Hawes Group, In-Sect, Little Gulliver & the Children, the Probe, the Sect, Somebody's Image and Roland Storm. In 1968, the Adelaide group, League of Gentlemen, recorded "Spooky" (Sharpe/Middlebrooks) and "Walking down Regent Street" (Potger) in the Melbourne studios of W&G.
