= Every Day (Eric Prydz song) =

Single by Eric Prydz

from the album Opus
- Released: 15 October 2012
- Recorded: 2012
- Genre: Progressive house; house
- Length: 6:43
- Label: Pryda; Virgin
- Songwriter(s): Eric Prydz; John Ciafone; Lemuel Springsteen

Eric Prydz singles chronology
"Niton (The Reason)" (2011)	"Every Day" (2012)	"Liberate" (2014)

"Every Day" is a single by Swedish DJ and producer, Eric Prydz. It was released by digital download on 15 October 2012 through Pryda Recordings as first single from the album Opus. The song has peaked to number 61 in the Netherlands. "Every Day" contains an interpolation of "Everyday" (2002) by American house producer John Ciafone.

== Track listing ==
Digital download
No.	Title	Writer(s)	Length
1.	"Every Day"	Eric Prydz; John Ciafone; Lemuel Springsteen	6:43
2.	"Every Day" (Fehrplay remix)	Prydz; Ciafone; Springsteen	7:00

Digital download — remixes
No.	Title	Writer(s)	Length
1.	"Every Day"	Prydz; Ciafone; Springsteen	6:44
2.	"We Are Mirage" (Eric Prydz and Empire of the Sun)	Prydz; Luke Steele; Jonathan Sloan; Nicholas Littlemore	6:20
3.	"Every Day" (Andy C remix)	Prydz; Ciafone; Springsteen	4:35
4.	"Every Day" (Fehrplay remix)	Prydz; Ciafone; Springsteen	7:01

== Credits and personnel ==
- Eric Prydz – songwriter, producer, programming, instrumentation
- John Ciafone – songwriter
- Lemuel Springsteen – songwriter
- Daniel Pearce – vocals, backing vocals
- Hal Ritson – backing vocals, vocal producer

Credits adapted from DR.

== Chart performance ==
=== Weekly charts ===
Chart (2012–13)	Peak position
Australia Club Chart (ARIA)	2
Belgium (Ultratip Bubbling Under Flanders)	5
Belgium (Ultratop Flanders Dance)	11
Belgium (Ultratip Bubbling Under Wallonia)	29
Belgium (Ultratop Wallonia Dance)	28
Global Dance Tracks (Billboard)	8
Mexico Espanol Airplay (Billboard)	141
Netherlands (Mega Dance Top 30)	9
Netherlands (Single Top 100)	61
Slovakia (Rádio Top 100)	15
US Dance Club Songs (Billboard)	3
US Dance/Mix Show Airplay (Billboard)	10

=== Year-end charts ===
Chart (2013)	Position
US Dance/Mix Show Airplay (Billboard)	33

== Release history ==
Region	Date	Format	Label
Netherlands	22 October 2012	Digital download	Virgin
