= Eric Prydz Presents Pryda =

Compilation album by Pryda
- Released: 21 May 2012
- Recorded: 2004–2012
- Genre: Progressive house; electro house; tech house
- Length: 64:14 (digital download); 227:29 (CD)
- Label: Virgin
- Producer: Eric Prydz

Pryda chronology
Eric Prydz Presents Pryda (2012)	Opus (2016)

Singles from Eric Prydz Presents Pryda
- 1. "Aftermath" Released: 24 May 2005; 2. "Human Behaviour" / "Lesson One" Released: 1 June 2007; 3. "Rymd" / "Armed" Released: 9 July 2007; 4. "Muranyi" / "Balaton" Released: 13 September 2007; 5. "Remember" / "Frankfurt" Released: 22 November 2007; 6. "Europa" Released: 20 December 2007; 7. "Pjanoo" / "F12" Released: 25 August 2008; 8. "Evouh" / "Rakfunk" / "Wakanpi" Released: 1 October 2008; 9. "Animal" / "Miami to Atlanta" / "Loaded" Released: 18 February 2009; 10. "Melo" / "Lift" / "Reeperbahn" Released: 14 April 2009; 11. "Waves" Released: 17 August 2009; 12. "Viro" / "Emos" Released: 28 April 2010; 13. "M.S.B.O.Y" / "The End" Released: 30 June 2010; 14. "Mirage" Released: 13 June 2011; 15. "2Night" Released: 19 August 2011

Professional ratings
Review scores
Source	Rating
AllMusic	4/5 stars
Harder Blogger Faster	4/5 stars

Eric Prydz Presents Pryda (also known simply as Pryda) is a retrospective compilation album by Swedish DJ Eric Prydz. The album is a compilation of all of Prydz' work under the alias "Pryda", mostly previously released on singles through Pryda Recordings. It was released on 21 May 2012 through Virgin Records on digital download format, and a 3-disc CD box set was also released by Virgin, on 22 May 2012.

== Overview ==
Pryda is Prydz' first full-length album following his career of releasing music in single and EP format. All of the tracks on the two retrospective mixes were previously released as singles on Pryda Recordings, as well as "Pjanoo" on the first disc. Prydz states in the CD booklet: "This album is a reflection of the last 8 years of my life, I'm so pleased to finally be able to present this to you."

== Track listing ==
The Beatport edition of the album only includes the first disc of the CD box set, with "You (Interlude)" and "Pjanoo" excluded, and "SW4" replaced with "SW4 (Club Mix)". This edition is entirely unmixed for use in DJ sets. The three disc CD version was also released on digital download.

=== Digital download – Beatport edition ===
No.	Title	Length
1.	"Shadows"	6:04
2.	"Agag"	5:50
3.	"Beyond 8"	5:42
4.	"Javlar"	6:23
5.	"Sunburst"	5:31
6.	"Hardrock Lausanne"	4:56
7.	"You"	6:57
8.	"SW4" (Club Mix)	6:34
9.	"Leja"	5:56
10.	"Mighty Love" (instrumental)	5:40
11.	"Allein"	5:36
Total length:		64:14

=== CD and digital download ===
Disc 1: Eric Prydz Presents Pryda
No.	Title	Length
1.	"Shadows"	6:05
2.	"Agag"	5:51
3.	"Beyond 8"	5:44
4.	"Javlar"	6:24
5.	"Sunburst"	5:33
6.	"Hardrock Lausanne"	4:58
7.	"You"	6:58
8.	"SW4"	5:27
9.	"Leja"	5:57
10.	"Mighty Love" (instrumental)	5:41
11.	"Allein"	5:36
12.	"You" (interlude)	3:18
13.	"Pjanoo" (Eric's Intro Edit)	5:59
Total length:		73:32

Disc 2: Retrospective Mix 01
No.	Title	Length
1.	"Lesson One"	4:41
2.	"Miami to Atlanta"	4:27
3.	"Genesis"	7:29
4.	"Rakfunk"	3:26
5.	"Europa"	6:02
6.	"Aftermath" (Eric's Edit)	9:01
7.	"Frankfurt"	5:35
8.	"Armed"	5:51
9.	"Reeperbahn"	5:58
10.	"Muranyi"	5:54
11.	"1983" (Eric Prydz Remix; Originally by Paolo Mojo)	10:40
12.	"The Gift"	6:25
Total length:		75:29

Disc 3: Retrospective Mix 02
No.	Title	Length
1.	"The End"	7:22
2.	"Rymd"	8:04
3.	"Waves"	5:58
4.	"Emos"	6:59
5.	"Viro" (Eric's Intro Edit)	8:47
6.	"Glimma"	4:57
7.	"Juletider"	5:13
8.	"With Me"	5:21
9.	"2Night"	6:58
10.	"Melo" (Eric's Special Edit)	6:28
11.	"M.S.B.O.Y"	5:35
12.	"Mirage"	6:47
Total length:		78:28

== Charts ==
Chart	Peak position
Belgian Albums (Ultratop Flanders)	84
UK Albums Chart (OCC)	40
US Dance/Electronic Albums (Billboard)	14
US Heatseekers Albums (Billboard)	19

== Release history ==
Region	Date	Label	Format
Various	21 May 2012	Virgin	Digital download
Various	22 May 2012	Virgin	CD
