= Stay Young (INXS song) =

Single by INXS

from the album Underneath the Colours
- B-side: "Lacavocal"
- Released: September 1981
- Recorded: July – August 1981; EMI Studios 301, Sydney
- Length: 3:25 (album version); 3:19 (single edit)
- Label: Deluxe
- Songwriters: Michael Hutchence, Andrew Farriss
- Producer: Richard Clapton

INXS singles chronology
"The Loved One" (1981)	"Stay Young" (1981)	"Night of Rebellion" (1982)

Music video
- "Stay Young" on YouTube

"Stay Young" is a song by Australian rock band INXS. It was released as the first single from the band's second album Underneath the Colours, in September 1981. "Stay Young" peaked at number 21 on the Australian Singles Charts in November.

The song included Dave Mason and Karen Ansel from the Australian band The Reels on backing vocals.

== Video ==
The video was directed by Peter Clifton who directed the 1976 Led Zeppelin concert film, The Song Remains the Same. The video was filmed on Clontarf Beach, Clontarf, Sydney, Australia. The production company was ECV (Enterprise Colour Video) in Crow's Nest, Sydney, Australia. Cameraman: Jim Walpole, Editor: David Gillies, Offline Editor: Grant Shanks.

== Track listing ==
7" single Track listing

No.	Title	Writer(s)	Length
1.	"Stay Young"	M. Hutchence, A. Farriss	3:19
2.	"Lacavocal" (Produced by M. Hutchence)	M. Hutchence, A. Farriss	3:36

== Charts ==
Chart (1981)	Peak position
Australia (Kent Music Report)	21
