= Opus (Eric Prydz album) =

2016 studio album by Eric Prydz

Studio album by Eric Prydz
- Released: 5 February 2016
- Recorded: 2012–2015
- Genre: Progressive house; electro house; tech house
- Length: 124:50
- Label: Virgin
- Producer: Eric Prydz

Eric Prydz chronology
Eric Prydz Presents Pryda (2012)	Opus (2016)

Singles from Opus
- 1. "Every Day" Released: 15 October 2012; 2. "Liberate" Released: 3 June 2014; 3. "Generate" Released: 18 June 2015; 4. "Opus" Released: 17 August 2015; 5. "Breathe" Released: 8 January 2016; 6. "Last Dragon" Released: 2 February 2016

Opus is the only studio album by Swedish DJ Eric Prydz. It was released on 5 February 2016 in Sweden through Virgin Records. The album includes the singles "Every Day", "Liberate", "Generate", "Opus", "Breathe" and "Last Dragon".

== Singles ==
"Every Day" was released as the lead single from the album on 15 October 2012; the song has charted in Belgium and the Netherlands. "Liberate" was released as the second single from the album on 3 June 2014, the song has charted in Belgium. "Generate" was released as the third single from the album on 18 June 2015. "Opus" was released as the fourth single from the album on 17 August 2015, the song has charted in Belgium. "Breathe" was released as the fifth single from the album on 8 January 2016. "Last Dragon" was released as the sixth single from the album on 2 February 2016.

== Critical reception ==
Professional ratings
Aggregate scores
Source	Rating
Metacritic	72/100
Review scores
Source	Rating
AllMusic	4/5 stars
The Guardian	3/5 stars
Mixmag	8/10
Pitchfork	6.2/10
PopMatters	7/10
Spin	8/10
Tom Hull	A−

Opus received generally positive reviews from music critics. At Metacritic, which assigns a normalised rating out of 100 to reviews from mainstream critics, the album has an average score of 72 based on 5 reviews, indicating "generally favorable reviews".

AllMusic's David Jeffries said that both the "electronica elite and sweaty club kids" will enjoy a record that "neither challenges nor fades into the background but entices and pleases the whole way through", concluding that: "Opus, the album, is keenly constructed and an excellent beginning-to-end journey in spite of its size." Andrew Unterberger of Spin wrote that "even haters will have to acknowledge Opus as being undeniable for what it is, an iconic collection of 21st-century house music that's so expansive and far-reaching it outgrows its very genre, unable to be contained within any four-walled enclosure."

Spin ranked it number 76 among the best albums released during the decade of the 2010s, across all genres. The magazine's writer Dan Weiss said: "It's the ultimate musical stealthbrag. It’s also the best traditional EDM record you've ever heard, not least because it holds up for two fucking hours but it's also a hell of a simulated rave for your airbuds, a window to the boundless paradise of desk-chair dancing and not caring how stupid your co-workers think you look."

== Track listing ==
Opus includes the following tracks. The CD version is split across two discs, with 10 tracks on the first (ending with "Eclipse"), and nine on the second (beginning with "Sunset at Café Mambo").

All tracks are written by Eric Prydz; additional writers noted.

No.	Title	Writer(s)	Length
1.	"Liam"		5:44
2.	"Black Dyce"		6:17
3.	"Collider"		5:23
4.	"Som Sas"		6:37
5.	"Last Dragon"		6:45
6.	"Moody Mondays" (featuring The Cut)	Neil Ormandy	4:42
7.	"Floj"		7:45
8.	"Trubble"		7:48
9.	"Klepht"		6:08
10.	"Eclipse"		5:58
11.	"Sunset at Café Mambo"		6:30
12.	"Breathe" (featuring Rob Swire)	Stefan Skarbek; Robert Swire-Thompson; Ormandy	3:09
13.	"Generate"	Thomas Havelock	7:11
14.	"Oddity"		8:05
15.	"Mija" (Re-scored)		6:31
16.	"Every Day"	John Ciafone; Lem Springsteen	7:14
17.	"Liberate"	Havelock	6:44
18.	"The Matrix"		7:16
19.	"Opus"		9:03
Total length:			124:50

== Charts ==
Chart (2016)	Peak position
Australian Albums (ARIA)	56
Belgian Albums (Ultratop Flanders)	19
Belgian Albums (Ultratop Wallonia)	49
Scottish Albums (OCC)	18
Swiss Albums (Schweizer Hitparade)	48
UK Albums (OCC)	23
UK Dance Albums (OCC)	1
US Billboard 200	164
US Top Dance Albums (Billboard)	1
US Heatseekers Albums (Billboard)	3

== Release history ==
Region	Date	Label	Format
Sweden	5 February 2016	Virgin	Digital download; CD
United States	5 February 2016	Astralwerks	CD
Europe	4 April 2016	Virgin	Vinyl
