= Par-T-One =

- Origin: Italy
- Genres: Electropunk, house, big beat
- Years active: 2001
- Members: Sergio Casu; Andrea Pareo

Par-T-One is an Italian electronic music group led by Sergio Casu, aka Sergione, and Andrea Pareo. They have also been sought after as re-mixers and house music DJs. According to the press, Sergio was in the Italian army before he became a DJ.

They released the single, "I'm So Crazy", based on "Just Keep Walking" by INXS and sampling "Like an Eagle" by Dennis Parker (aka Wade Nichols). The song reached number 19 on the UK Singles Chart, and top ten in Scotland. The video (directed by Sam Brown and Paul Gore, who have had later success by directing videos for James Blunt and The Bravery) won and has been nominated for various awards in the short film category and best promo video.

In 2021, they collaborated with Salmo on the song "Fuori di testa" from his 2021 album Flop.

== Discography ==
=== Singles ===
List of singles, with selected chart positions
Title	Year	Peak chart positions			
Title	Year	AUS	BEL (FL)	FRA	UK
"I'm So Crazy" (vs. INXS)	2001	45	34	76	19

=== Remixes ===
- La La Land - Green Velvet
- I Want You Back - X-Press 2
- Bring It On -Playgroup (including dub)
- Call Me - Dino
- Doo Uap, Doo Uap, Doo Uap - Gabin
- I Can't Say What I Am - Margot
- O Superman - Silverspin
- We've Got The Time - Jupiter Age
- Challenge Destiny - Rollerblade
- Chase the Sun - Planet Funk

== Websites ==
DJ Pareo's Website
