= Call on Me (Eric Prydz song) =

2004 single

Single by Eric Prydz
- Released: 13 September 2004
- Length: 7:34 (original); 2:57 (radio edit)
- Label: T56
- Songwriters: Eric Prydz; Steve Winwood; Will Jennings
- Producer: Eric Prydz

Eric Prydz singles chronology
| "In and Out" (2004) | "Call on Me" (2004) | "Woz Not Woz" (2005) |

Music video
- "Call on Me" on YouTube

"Call on Me" is a song by the Swedish DJ and producer Eric Prydz, released on 13 September 2004. It is based on a replayed sample of the 1982 Steve Winwood song "Valerie", and was inspired by a similar track created by the French duo Together. Its music video features women performing aerobics.

"Call on Me" reached number one on several record charts and won awards at the Echo Music Prize and International Dance Music Awards. In 2025, Billboard named "Call on Me" the 57th-greatest dance song. Prydz refused to perform it for decades, calling it "lazy". In 2025, he played it for the first time in 20 years at a show in Austin, Texas.

== Production ==
"Call on Me" is based on a replayed sample of the 1982 Steve Winwood song "Valerie". Prydz was inspired by a similar track created by the French duo Together, comprising Thomas Bangalter (of Daft Punk) and DJ Falcon. After Together declined to release their track, Prydz recreated it. Winwood rerecorded his vocals for "Call on Me". The "Valerie" instrumental was recreated by the company Replay Heaven, which recreates samples to simplify licensing.

== Reception ==
"Call on Me" reached number one on the UK singles chart in September 2004. It returned to number one on 17 October, selling 23,519 copies. It was the lowest-selling UK number one since records began, as singles were facing competition from downloads, which were not yet included in the chart.

In 2005, "Call on Me" won Dance Production of the Year at the Echo Music Prize. At the International Dance Music Awards, it was nominated for Best House/Garage Track and Best Pop Dance Track in 2005 and Best Underground Dance Track in 2006. In 2025, Billboard named "Call on Me" the 57th-greatest dance song, describing it as "a bright, bubbly and beloved anthem reminiscent of a sparklier time in dance music".

== Music video ==
The "Call on Me" video was directed by Huse Monfaradi, who proposed a "throwaway idea about sexual aerobics". In the video, Juan Pablo Di Pace plays a man participating in an aerobics class of women led by an instructor played by Deanne Berry. Soon after shooting began, power was lost after an excavator cut through a cable, and the video was nearly canceled to claim the insurance.

The video was noted for its eroticism. In 2004, the British prime minister, Tony Blair, said: "The first time it came on, I nearly fell off my rowing machine." In 2005, the video won Best Dance Video at the IDMA. In 2016, Vice wrote that "there's something so genuinely real about the video, something so almost tactile about it, so genuinely filled with priapic longing and lycra-encased lust that watching it now, feels like an act of genuine transgression ... 'Call on Me' definitely is a work of art. It is amazingly lurid, amazingly tacky, amazingly brash and amazingly bold." In 2011, NME named it the fifth-worst music video, citing its "lowest-common-denominator vibe". Monfaradi said no one in the production felt the video was "over the top, or extraordinary or even erotic".

== Live performances ==
Prydz refused to play "Call on Me" for years, calling it "super lazy". After he refused to play it at a show in Canada, some members of the audience threw bottles at him. On 15 March 2025, Prydz played it at a show in Austin, Texas, for the first time in two decades.

== Track listings ==
- Swedish, UK, and Australian CD single
1. "Call on Me" (radio edit) – 2:57
2. "Call on Me" (Eric Prydz vs Retarded Funk mix) – 7:36
3. "Call on Me" (JJ Stockholm club mix) – 8:01
4. "Call on Me" (Filterheadz remix) – 7:13
5. "Call on Me" (Red Kult Dub Pass 2 mix) – 7:50
- Swedish and UK DVD single
1. "Call on Me" (daytime version video)
2. "Call on Me" (late night version video)
3. "Call on Me" (radio edit audio)
4. "Call on Me" (Eric Prydz vs. Retarded Funk mix audio)
5. Photo gallery
- French CD single
1. "Call on Me" (radio edit) – 2:49
2. "Call on Me" (Eric Prydz vs Retarded Funk mix) – 7:33
- French DVD single
1. "Call on Me" (dirty version video) – 2:53
2. "Call on Me" (clean version video) – 2:53
- UK 12-inch single

A1. "Call on Me" (Eric Prydz vs Retarded Funk mix)
B1. "Call on Me" (Red Kult Dub Pass 2 mix)
B2. "Call on Me" (Filterheadz remix)

- US 12-inch single

A1. "Call on Me" (Eric Prydz vs Retarded Funk mix) – 7:33
A2. "Call on Me" (Filterheadz remix) – 7:05
B1. "Call on Me" (JJ Stockholm club remix) – 7:51
B2. "Call on Me" (Red Kult Dub Pass 2 mix) – 7:53

== Charts ==
=== Weekly charts ===
Weekly chart performance for "Call on Me"
| Chart (2004–2006) | Peak position |
|---|---|
| Australia (ARIA) | 2 |
| Australian Club Chart (ARIA) | 3 |
| Australian Dance (ARIA) | 1 |
| Austria (Ö3 Austria Top 40) | 1 |
| Belgium (Ultratop 50 Flanders) | 4 |
| Belgium (Ultratop 50 Wallonia) | 13 |
| CIS Airplay (TopHit) | 8 |
| Czech Republic (IFPI) | 2 |
| Denmark (Tracklisten) | 2 |
| Europe (Eurochart Hot 100) | 1 |
| Finland (Suomen virallinen lista) | 4 |
| France (SNEP) | 1 |
| Germany (GfK) | 1 |
| Greece (IFPI) | 2 |
| Hungary (Rádiós Top 40) | 3 |
| Hungary (Dance Top 40) | 4 |
| Ireland (IRMA) | 1 |
| Ireland Dance (IRMA) | 1 |
| Netherlands (Dutch Top 40) | 4 |
| Netherlands (Single Top 100) | 10 |
| New Zealand (Recorded Music NZ) | 38 |
| Norway (VG-lista) | 1 |
| Romania (Romanian Top 100) | 4 |
| Russia Airplay (TopHit) | 7 |
| Scottish Singles Sales (Official Charts) | 1 |
| Spain (Promusicae) | 10 |
| Sweden (Sverigetopplistan) | 1 |
| Switzerland (Schweizer Hitparade) | 2 |
| UK Singles (Official Charts) | 1 |
| UK Dance (Official Charts) | 1 |
| Ukraine Airplay (TopHit) | 57 |
| US Dance Club Songs (Billboard) | 29 |
| US Dance Singles Sales (Billboard) | 23 |
| US Dance Airplay (Billboard) | 5 |

=== Year-end charts ===
2004 year-end chart performance for "Call on Me"
| Chart (2004) | Position |
|---|---|
| Australia (ARIA) | 46 |
| Australian Club Chart (ARIA) | 27 |
| Australian Dance (ARIA) | 2 |
| Austria (Ö3 Austria Top 40) | 18 |
| Belgium (Ultratop 50 Flanders) | 60 |
| CIS Airplay (TopHit) | 30 |
| Europe (Eurochart Hot 100) | 9 |
| France (SNEP) | 88 |
| Germany (Media Control GfK) | 12 |
| Ireland (IRMA) | 10 |
| Netherlands (Dutch Top 40) | 36 |
| Netherlands (Single Top 100) | 85 |
| Russia Airplay (TopHit) | 18 |
| Sweden (Hitlistan) | 24 |
| Switzerland (Schweizer Hitparade) | 34 |
| UK Singles (OCC) | 4 |

2005 year-end chart performance for "Call on Me"
| Chart (2005) | Position |
|---|---|
| Australian Dance (ARIA) | 19 |
| Austria (Ö3 Austria Top 40) | 71 |
| Belgium (Ultratop 50 Wallonia) | 89 |
| Europe (Eurochart Hot 100) | 13 |
| France (SNEP) | 20 |
| Germany (Media Control GfK) | 71 |
| Hungary (Rádiós Top 40) | 86 |
| Romania (Romanian Top 100) | 91 |
| Sweden (Hitlistan) | 66 |
| Switzerland (Schweizer Hitparade) | 36 |
| UK Singles (OCC) | 199 |
| US Hot Dance Airplay (Billboard) | 37 |

=== Decade-end charts ===
Decade-end chart performance for "Call on Me"
| Chart (2000–2009) | Position |
|---|---|
| Germany (Media Control GfK) | 84 |

== Certifications ==
Certifications and sales for "Call on Me"
| Region | Certification | Certified units/sales |
|---|---|---|
| Australia (ARIA) | Platinum | 70,000^{^} |
| Denmark (IFPI Danmark) | Platinum | 90,000^{‡} |
| France (SNEP) | Gold | 200,000^{*} |
| Germany (BVMI) | 3× Gold | 450,000^{‡} |
| Italy (FIMI) | Gold | 50,000^{‡} |
| New Zealand (RMNZ) | 2× Platinum | 60,000^{‡} |
| Spain (Promusicae) | Gold | 30,000^{‡} |
| Sweden (GLF) | Gold | 10,000^{^} |
| Switzerland (IFPI Switzerland) | Gold | 20,000^{^} |
| United Kingdom (BPI) | 2× Platinum | 1,200,000^{‡} |
^{*} Sales figures based on certification alone.^{^} Shipments figures based on certification alone.^{‡} Sales+streaming figures based on certification alone.

== Release history ==
Release dates and formats for "Call on Me"
| Region | Date | Format(s) | Label(s) | Ref. |
|---|---|---|---|---|
| United Kingdom | 13 September 2004 | 12-inch vinyl; CD; DVD | Data | |
| Australia | 18 October 2004 | CD | Ministry of Sound | |
| United States | 26 October 2004 | Digital EP | Ultra | |
