= If You... =

Single by Magic Box
- Released: August 19, 2003
- Genre: Italodance; Eurodance
- Length: 3:27
- Label: Spy Records
- Songwriter: Tristano De Bonis
- Producer: Rossano Prini

Magic Box singles chronology
"4 Your Love" (2002)	"If You..." (2003)	"This Is Better" (2003)

"If You..." is a song performed by the Italian singer Magic Box. It was written by Tristano De Bonis, and produced by Rossano Prini and Gianluca Mensi. The single was released in January 2003 by Spy/Time.

== Charts ==
Chart (2003)	Peak position
Australia (ARIA)	61
Brazil (Billboard Brasil Hot 100)	82
Brazil Hot Pop Songs	31
Lebanon (Lebanese Top 20)	9
