= I'm So Crazy =

Single by Par-T-One vs. INXS

from the album INXS²: The Remixes
- Released: 1 October 2001
- Genre: Electronic rock, house
- Label: Mercury
- Songwriter(s): Andrew Farriss, Michael Hutchence
- Producer(s): Par-T-One

INXS singles chronology
"Precious Heart" (2001)	"I'm So Crazy" (2001)	"Tight" (2002)

"I'm So Crazy" is a song by Italian electronic duo Par-T-One and Australian rock group INXS. It is a remixed version of the INXS song "Just Keep Walking" released in 1980.

== Background ==
The music video depicts people doing the pogo move, and Michael Hutchence's vocal style resembling a skinhead. It was directed by Sam Brown and Paul Gore, who had later success directing videos for James Blunt and the Bravery. The video was nominated for various awards in the short film and best promo video categories.

The song contains samples of Dennis Parker's "Like an Eagle" and "I'm So in Love".

The single reached No. 19 on the UK Singles Chart.

== Track listing ==
1. "I'm So Crazy" (Radio Edit)
2. "I'm So Crazy" (Original Version)
3. "I'm So Crazy" (Erick Morillo vs Who the Funk / Harry 'Choo Choo' Romero Mix)
4. "I'm So Crazy" (Crazy Guitar Mix)

== Charts ==
Chart performance for "I'm So Crazy"
Chart (2001)	Peak position
Australia (ARIA)	45
Belgium (Ultratop 50 Flanders)	34
France (SNEP)	76
UK Singles (OCC)	19
