= The Loved One (song) =

1966 single by The Loved Ones

- Side A of Australian single

Single by The Loved Ones

from the album Magic Box
- B-side: "This Is Love"
- Released: May 1966
- Recorded: 1966
- Genre: Rhythm and blues, rock
- Length: 2:45
- Label: In/W&G
- Songwriters: Ian Clyne, Gerry Humphrys, Rob Lovett

The Loved Ones singles chronology
"The Loved One" (1966)	"Ever Lovin' Man" (1966)

"The Loved One" is a song by Australian R&B/rock band the Loved Ones and was released in May 1966 as the debut single ahead of their extended play The Loved Ones (also known as the Blueberry Hill EP), which appeared in December. The song also featured on their debut long play album, Magic Box, in October 1967. "The Loved One" reached No. 2 on the Australian Top 40 singles charts in 1966.

== Background ==
The Loved Ones were formed in Melbourne in 1965 by Gerry Humphrys, Ian Clyne and Kim Lynch. They had previously been members of a youthful trad jazz band, the Red Onion Jazz Band, in which Humphrys and Lynch had played clarinet and tuba respectively. They recruited drummer Gavin Anderson and ex–Wild Cherries guitarist Rob Lovett. The band were renowned as an exciting, if erratic, live act in a Stones–Animals mould and quickly rose to prominence in the local club and dance scene.

The group's visual impact was heightened by their striking mod stage attire. The band had a strong focal point thanks to the charismatic stage presence, saturnine good looks and growling blues-influenced baritone voice of Humphrys. The Loved Ones were one of the first Australian rock bands to use electric piano as part of their regular stage setup, and their distinctive keyboard-based sound set them apart from most of their contemporaries.

They signed to the In Records label (a subsidiary of W&G Records) early in 1966. They shot to national prominence, scoring a major Australian hit with "The Loved One", which reached No. 2 on the Australian Top 40 singles charts in May. "Ever Lovin' Man" was issued in July and reached No. 9. A reworking of Fats Domino's "Blueberry Hill" appeared on their first extended play, Blueberry Hill, in December—together with the two previous singles. "Sad Dark Eyes" followed in January 1967.

They released an album in 1967 titled Magic Box, a collection of their singles. The Loved Ones split later that year in October, just two years after they were formed.

In 2001, "The Loved One" was selected as No. 6 on the Australasian Performing Right Association (APRA)'s list of Top 30 Australian songs of all time.

In 2011, "The Loved One" was on the soundtrack, and over the opening titles, of the ABC TV drama Paper Giants.

== Track listing ==
No.	Title	Writer(s)	Length
1.	"The Loved One"	I. Clyne, G. Humphrys, R. Lovett	2:45
2.	"This Is Love"	I. Clyne	2:25

== Personnel ==
The Loved Ones' members

- Gavin Anderson – drums
- Ian Clyne – piano
- Gerry Humphrys – vocals
- Rob Lovett – guitar
- Kim Lynch – bass guitar

== INXS version ==
"The Loved One"

Song by INXS

from the album Kick
- B-side: "The Unloved One"
- Released: October 12, 1987
- Recorded: 1987
- Genre: Blues rock; pop rock
- Length: 3:37
- Songwriters: Ian Clyne, Gerry Humphrys, Rob Lovett
- Producer: Chris Thomas

INXS singles chronology
"Just Keep Walking" (1980)	"The Loved One" (1987)	"I Send a Message"

"The Loved One" was recorded twice by INXS. The original studio version was issued as a stand-alone single in March 1981, in Australia only. It reached No. 20 on the national charts, and was later featured on their 1982 compilation album Inxsive.

The band re-recorded the track (in a substantially different arrangement) for their 1987 international hit album Kick. INXS also frequently performed the song live, and one such version is featured on their 1991 live video, Live Baby Live.

=== Track listing (original 1981 single) ===
No.	Title	Writer(s)	Length
1.	"The Loved One"	I. Clyne, G. Humphrys, R. Lovett	3:07
2.	"The Unloved One"	M. Hutchence, A. Farriss, T. Farriss, J. Farriss, G. Beers, K. Pengilly	3:54

== Releases ==
Year	Format	Chart peak AUS	Label	Catalogue No.
May 1966	7" single (The Loved Ones)	2	In	INS-2610
March 1981	7" single (INXS)	20	Deluxe	103741
