= The Loved Ones (Australian band) =

Australian rock band

- The Loved Ones in 1967; From left: Kim Lynch, Rob Lovett, Gavin Anderson, Treva Richards (sitting), Gerry Humphrys

Background information
- Origin: Melbourne, Australia
- Genres: R&B, rock, blues rock
- Years active: 1965–1967, 1987
- Labels: W&G; In (1966–1967); Astor; Karussell/PolyGram; Raven; Mushroom
- Past members: see members list below

The Loved Ones were an Australian rock band formed in 1965 in Melbourne following the British Invasion. The line-up of Gavin Anderson on drums, Ian Clyne on organ and piano, Gerry Humphrys on vocals and harmonica, Rob Lovett on guitar and Kim Lynch on bass guitar recorded their early hits. Their signature song, "The Loved One", reached number two on Australian singles charts and was later covered by INXS. In 2001 it was selected as number six on the Australasian Performing Right Association's (APRA) list of Top 30 Australian songs of all time. Their debut album, The Loved Ones' Magic Box, was released late in 1967 and included their other hit singles, "Ever Lovin' Man" and "Sad Dark Eyes". They disbanded in October 1967 and, although the band's main career lasted only two years, they are regarded as one of the most significant Australian bands of the 1960s. They reformed for a short tour in 1987 which provided the album Live on Blueberry Hill. Humphrys lived in London from the mid-1970s until his death on 4 December 2005. On 27 October 2010, the Loved Ones were inducted into the Australian Recording Industry Association (ARIA) Hall of Fame.

== History ==
=== 1965–1966: Formation and debut EP ===
The Loved Ones were formed in Melbourne in October 1965 by Gerry Humphrys (originally from London) on vocals and harmonica, Kim Lynch on bass guitar and Ian Clyne on organ and piano. They were all former members of a trad jazz group, the Red Onion Jazz Band, in which Humphrys played clarinet and sang and Lynch played tuba. Red Onions Jazz Band was released as an eponymous album in 1964 on W&G Records' blue label. Following the British Invasion, led by the Beatles' tour of Australia in mid-1964, the band split as the three members wanted to switch to R&B and felt they had drifted towards more mainstream 1940s jazz. The Loved Ones were named after Evelyn Waugh's short and darkly satirical novel The Loved One. To round out the line-up, Humphrys, Lynch and Clyne recruited former Wild Cherries guitarist Rob Lovett. Their first drummer, Terry Nott, was soon followed by Gavin Anderson.

The Loved Ones became renowned as an exciting, if erratic, live act in a Rolling Stones/Animals mould and rose to prominence in the local club and dance scene. The group's visual impact was heightened by their striking mod stage attire and the band had a strong focal point thanks to the charismatic stage presence, saturnine good looks and growling blues-influenced baritone voice of Humphrys, who is widely acknowledged as one of Australia's finest male pop-rock vocalists. The Loved Ones were also one of the first Australian pop bands to use the electric piano (a Hohner pianet) as part of their regular stage set-up and their distinctive keyboard-based sound set them apart from most of their contemporaries.

Early in 1966, they signed to the In Records label, a subsidiary of W&G Records. Their debut single was "The Loved One", which reached number nine on the singles charts in May. The song was written by Clyne, Humphrys and Lovett. It has a complex double rhythm, which is joined by hand clapping, and Humphrys' bluesy and soaring vocals. According to Lovett, the inspiration for the hand claps came from Clyne, who went to a nightclub to talk to another musician:

Yeah, the organist said he liked it but he thought we should put some hand-claps in so the audience didn't get lost. In those days most people were brought up with 'easy listenin' music – C&W, very straightforward. In the end, the hand-claps were more dominant than the 2-beat pattern so the whole thing sounded a bit like a crazy waltz. As it turned out the organist was absolutely right. It would never have made it without his suggestion and the way he played. He really gave it some atmosphere and suspenseful excitement – building up on the first chord sequence till it burst out into the second and Gerry screamed out his, 'Yonder she's walking'.

The director, Peter Lamb, filmed the group performing it for a documentary on mid-1960s Melbourne, Approximately Panther (1966), with Go-Set writer Doug Panther interviewing other local acts including Lynne Randell and Bobby & Laurie. The song was an Australian Top 20 hit again in 1981 when covered by INXS.

The Loved Ones' released their second single, "Ever Lovin' Man", in July 1966, which peaked at number seven on the Go-Set National Top 40 singles chart in October while "The Loved One" was still in the Top 20. To promote their singles, the group appeared on ATV-0 popular music series The Go!! Show on 24 October to perform "The Loved One", "Ever Lovin' Man" and "More Than Love".

A cover of Fats Domino's version of "Blueberry Hill" was released in December 1966, which reached number 11 on the Go-Set singles chart. A self-titled EP was released After some personal crises, Clyne left and moved to Sydney; he was replaced by Treva Richards (ex Delta Set) on piano and organ in September.

We had a falling out between Ian and the rest of us. Nothing really that Ian did, except he did get sick of being the only one to do any of the promotional or organising work. We were all kids, and if anyone would do it, the rest stood back. As a result, Ian was cast into the position of being the nagging parent, and became more in tune with our manager than the rest of us. Without going through the details, it came messily down to his being fired.

— Rob Lovett

After leaving the Loved Ones, Clyne played in the Black Pearls, the Ram Jam Big Band, Excalibur, Levi Smith's Clefs and Chain; he was in Aunty Jack's backing group, the Gong, in the mid-1970s.

=== 1967: The Loved Ones' Magic Box and split ===
In February 1967, The Loved Ones released "Sad Dark Eyes", which peaked in the Top 20. This was the first single with Richards' input. "A Love Like Ours" was released in April and also reached the Top 20. Each captured an emotional intensity and musical inventiveness which marked them out from their peers. On 23 April, they performed at Festival Hall, Melbourne and recorded live versions of "Ever Lovin' Man", "Sad Dark Eyes" and "The Loved One". They supported the national tour by Eric Burdon and the Animals and Dave Dee, Dozy, Beaky, Mick & Tich in April. In May, Lynch left and they added a new lead guitarist, Danny De Lacy (from Los Angeles), with Lovett moving to bass guitar.

In August 1967, "Love Song", was released but did not chart. They released their debut album, The Loved Ones' Magic Box, in October 1967. The Loved Ones split in late October, two years after they formed.

The split was a non-event. We had been in Perth for two weeks on what felt like a very long tour. A miserable tour by the end. It started off so well. We were mobbed at the airport and smuggled off in the caterer's van. We had people who spotted us and chased the cars that whisked us off, waving their autograph books in vain. We did TV, we did radio, we did concerts, we did a trip round Albany, Kalgoorlie and other places on the way – one-nighters – but the record company, W&G, hadn't thought to put any records in the shops. Anyway, at the end of the tour the promoters disappeared. I can't remember if we even had our tickets home. We got back to Melbourne broke and completely dispirited. People tell me our last gig was at Opus (Ormond Hall in Prahran) but I have to say I haven't any recollection of it.

— Rob Lovett

The Loved Ones' Magic Box is considered a classic recording which enjoys cult status and has reportedly never been out-of-print since it was released.

=== 1968–1986: After disbandment ===
Humphrys initially managed rock'n'rollers the Valentines (with vocalists Bon Scott and Vince Lovegrove). He formed Gerry and The Joy Band in 1971, a floating aggregation that, at times, included members of Daddy Cool and the Aztecs. At that time he moved to the suburban fringes of Sandringham and hosted many functions at his Spring Street residence. He went on to bigger things by hosting the inaugural Sunbury Pop Festival in 1972. In 1973 he returned to London in an unsuccessful attempt to save his failing marriage, giving up his music career to become a psychiatric nurse.

Lovett formed a vocal trio, the Virgil Brothers, with Peter Doyle and Malcolm McGee (Wild Cherries, Python Lee Jackson) in 1968. The Virgil Brothers were managed by Lovett's wife, journalist Lily Brett, and released a number of singles and toured the UK before splitting up in 1970. In the early '70s Lovett's songs were recorded by Peter Doyle in The New Seekers. In the early 1990s Lovett joined The Fudds, alongside Chris Dyson, Stewart MacFarlane, Vic Mavridis and Peter Robertson. They released several albums over the following seven years.

Anderson also moved into management, looking after The Party Machine until they split in 1969; he relocated to London and then New York. In 1981 he formed a PR company, Gavin Anderson & Company, which became a large and successful strategic communications business with headquarters in New York and offices throughout the world. Nott joined the psychedelic band, Grunewald Burlesque, and later became an architect in Melbourne. After Lynch left the band he turned to painting. Richards married and moved to Adelaide to raise a family. He lived for a number of years in the former Barr-Smith "Auchendarroch" property in the Adelaide Hills.

=== 1987: Reformation and Live on Blueberry Hill ===
Following a resurgence of interest in the Loved Ones, prompted in part by the INXS cover of "The Loved One", the band reformed for a live tour in September 1987. The line-up of Clyne, Humphrys, Lovett and Lynch was augmented by Melbourne drummer Peter Luscombe sitting in for Anderson. The album Live on Blueberry Hill followed on Mushroom Records.

=== 1999–present: Current activities and ARIA Hall of Fame ===
In 1999, author Richard Miles wrote More Than a Loved One: The Musical Career of Gerry Humphrys. In 2000, filmmaker Nigel Buesst directed the documentary, Gerry Humphrys – the Loved One. The film includes interviews with band mates, performance footage and Buesst's efforts to track down and interview Humphrys at his suburban home in south London.

An Australian Broadcasting Corporation TV series, Long Way to the Top, was broadcast in August 2001. The Loved Ones featured in "Episode 2: Ten Pound Rocker 1963–1968" where they are described as having "quirky rhythms and charismatic lead singer Gerry Humphries [sic], the Loved Ones soon gained a serious cult status". The TV series inspired the Long Way to the Top national concert tour during August–September 2002, which featured a host of the best Australian acts of the 1950s, 1960s and 1970s. Although invited onto the tour, the band had to decline as Humphrys had to remain in the UK.

Humphrys remained in London where he died of a heart attack on 4 December 2005. He had three daughters.

In 2010, the Loved Ones were inducted into the ARIA Hall of Fame. On hearing of their induction the band said "We were kids who discovered we could actually write and play music we believed in ... and other kids liked it too." Attending in person were Clyne, Lynch and Richards, with Anderson (a resident of New York) and Lovett (London) unavailable. They were inducted by concert promoter, Michael Chugg, while rocker Diesel performed their signature tune, "The Loved One". In October 2010, Magic Box (1967) was listed in the book 100 Best Australian Albums.

== Members ==
- Gerry Humphrys (b. 19 July 1941, London – d. 4 December 2005, London) – vocals, harmonica, hand-claps (1965–1967, 1987)
- Kim Lynch (b. 18 May 1945, Sydney) – bass guitar (1965–1967, 1987)
- Rob Lovett (b. 11 November 1944, Melbourne) – guitar, bass guitar (1965–1967, 1987)
- Ian Clyne – piano, organ, guitar (1965–1966, 1987)
- Terence "Terry" Nott (b. 28 September 1945, Melbourne) – drums (1965)
- Gavin Anderson (b. 12 September 1945, Melbourne) – drums (1965–1967)
- Treva Richards (b. 3 December 1945, Hamilton, Victoria) – electric piano, piano, organ (1966–1967)
- Danny De Lacy (b. 5 August 1943, Los Angeles) – guitar (1967)
- Peter Luscombe – drums (1987)

== Discography ==
=== Studio albums ===
Title	Album details
The Loved Ones' Magic Box	Released: October 1967; Format: LP; Label: W&G (WG-S/25/5127)

=== Live albums ===
Title	Album details
Live on Blueberry Hill	Released: October 1997; Format: LP, Cassette, CD; Label: Mushroom Records (L 38882); Recorded: Ferntree Gully Hotel

=== Extended plays ===
Title	Album details
The Loved Ones	Released: December 1966; Format: 7-inch EP; Label: W&G (WG-E.2712)

=== Singles ===
Year	Title	Peak chart positions		Album
Year	Title	Go-Set	KMR	Album
1966	"The Loved One"	9	11	The Loved Ones
1966	"Ever Lovin' Man"	7	9	The Loved Ones
1966	"Blueberry Hill"	11	10	The Loved Ones
1967	"Sad Dark Eyes"	20	27	The Loved Ones' Magic Box
1967	"A Love Like Ours"	18	26	The Loved Ones' Magic Box
1967	"Love Song"	—	83	The Loved Ones' Magic Box
"—" denotes a recording that did not chart or was not released in that territory.

== Awards and nominations ==
=== ARIA Music Awards ===
The ARIA Music Awards is an annual awards ceremony that recognises excellence, innovation, and achievement across all genres of Australian music. They commenced in 1987. The Loved Ones were inducted into the Hall of Fame in 2010.

Year	Nominee / work	Award	Result
2010	themselves	ARIA Hall of Fame	inductee

=== Go-Set Pop Poll ===
The Go-Set Pop Poll was coordinated by teen-oriented pop music newspaper Go-Set and was established in February 1966 and conducted an annual poll during 1966 to 1972 of its readers to determine the most popular personalities.

Year	Nominee / work	Award	Result
1966	themselves	Top Australian Group	4th

=== Legacy and influence ===
- In 2001 "The Loved One" was selected as number six on the Australasian Performing Right Association's list of ten best Australian songs of all time.
