= Eric Prydz =

Swedish DJ and record producer (born 1976)

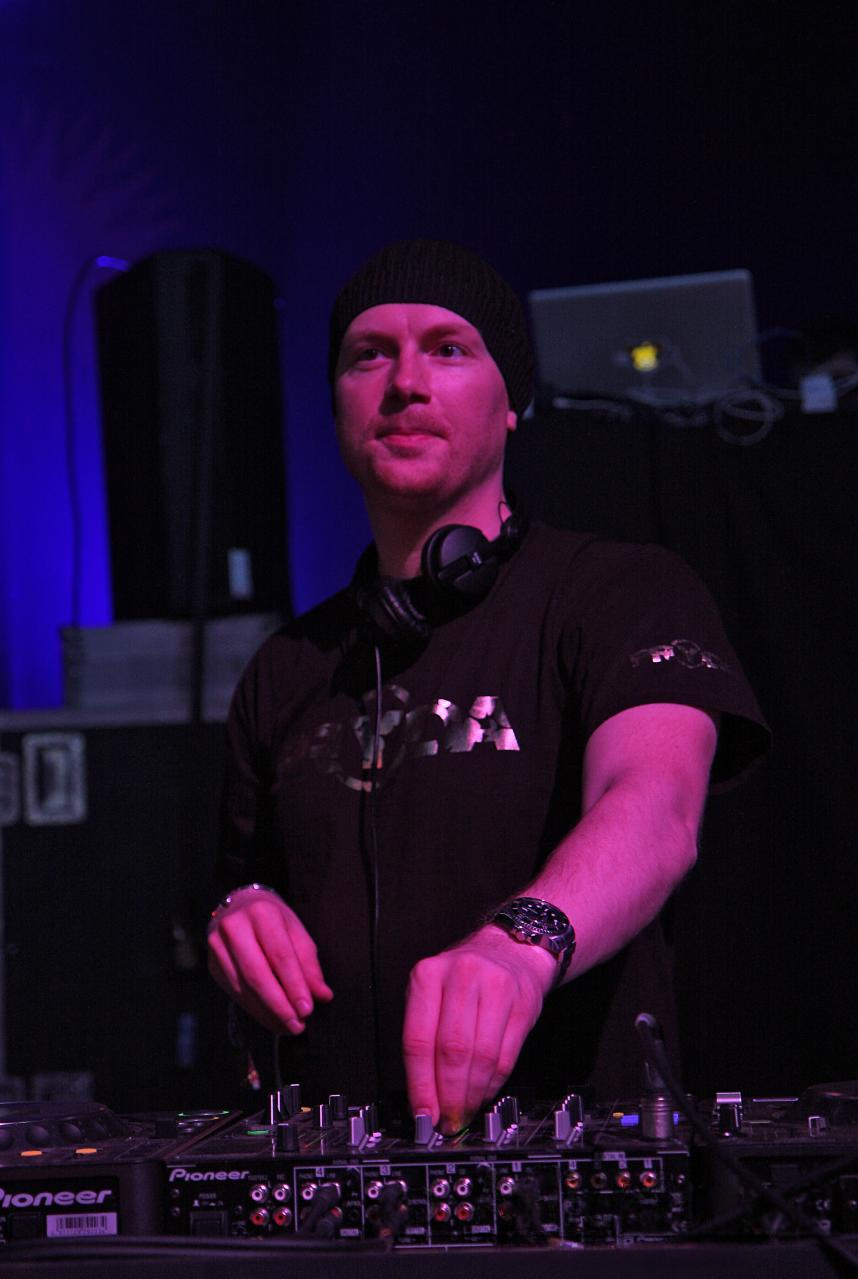
- Prydz at Glastonbury in 2009

Background information
- Also known as: AxEr; A&P Project; Cirez D; Dukes of Sluca; Groove System; Hardform; Pryda; Moo; Sheridan; Tonja Holma; Fiol Lasse
- Born: Eric Sheridan Prydz; 19 July 1976 (age 50)
- Origin: Täby, Stockholm County, Sweden
- Genres: House; techno; progressive house; tech house
- Occupations: DJ; record producer
- Years active: 2001–present
- Labels: Pryda; Mouseville; Pryda Friends; Virgin; EMI; Astralwerks; Ministry of Sound; Arista
- Formerly of: Swedish House Mafia
- Website: ericprydz.com

Eric Sheridan Prydz (/prɪdz/; Swedish: [ˈêːrɪk ˈɕêːrɪdan ˈprʏts]; born 19 July 1976), also known by his many aliases including Pryda (/ˈpraɪdə/) and Cirez D (/ˈsaɪrɛz/), is a Swedish DJ and record producer. He rose to prominence with his 2004 hit single "Call on Me", and saw continued chart success with "Proper Education" in 2007, "Pjanoo" in 2008, and "Opus" in 2015. In 2016, he released his debut studio album, Opus.

In 2017, he won DJ of the Year at the Electronic Music Awards and was also nominated for Live Act of the Year.

== Career ==
=== 2004–2008: "Call on Me" and Swedish House Mafia ===
Prydz is perhaps best known for his 2004 hit single "Call on Me". It topped the UK singles chart for five weeks and was number one on the German Top 100 for six consecutive weeks. Although this track made him immensely popular, Prydz has stopped playing it in his shows in an attempt to distance himself from it. In some respects he has succeeded, and with his newer songs, Prydz has gained recognition from both underground and mainstream fans. In 2006, he released a remixed version of Pink Floyd's "Another Brick in the Wall, Part 2", titled "Proper Education", with a video.

In 2008, Prydz released the critically acclaimed single "Pjanoo", which topped the UK Dance Chart.

Together with Axwell, Sebastian Ingrosso and Steve Angello, Prydz formed a group of DJs that informally referred to themselves as the Swedish House Mafia. When the group with the same name officially formed in late 2008, Prydz decided not to join his friends. He has collaborated with Axwell under the name Axer and with Angello as A&P Project.

=== 2009–2013: Eric Prydz Presents Pryda ===
In 2009, Prydz released "Miami to Atlanta", where the "Pryda snare" was first used. The Pryda snare is a popular technique in house and trance music consisting of a compressed and sustained snare sample at the end of a bar. Commonly used to mark progressions in a song structure, it has been widely sampled in the electronic dance music world, notably by producers such as Martin Garrix, Dimitri Vegas & Like Mike, and W&W.

On 21 May 2012, Prydz released his debut artist album, Eric Prydz Presents Pryda, as a 3-disc album on Virgin Records (Astralwerks in the USA). Disc 1 is made up of new unreleased Pryda productions, which some fans may have heard as works in progress (including Shadows, Agag, Mighty Love, Allein and the intro edit of Pjanoo). Discs 2 and 3 bring together many of the classic tracks from the Pryda catalogue, sequenced and continuously mixed by the man himself, including some of his special re-edits.

The Ministry of Sound club in London hosted the launch of Eric Prydz Presents Pryda on 14 April 2012, where Prydz played some of the tracks from the album. Inserting the CD in a computer and visiting Prydz's Facebook page provides access to a download of 'Tijuana', a track previously known as 'Space Miami ID' in .WAV format.

His 2013 Essential Mix was named Essential Mix of the Year by Pete Tong.

=== 2014–present: PR(10)DA, PR(15)DA EPs and Opus ===
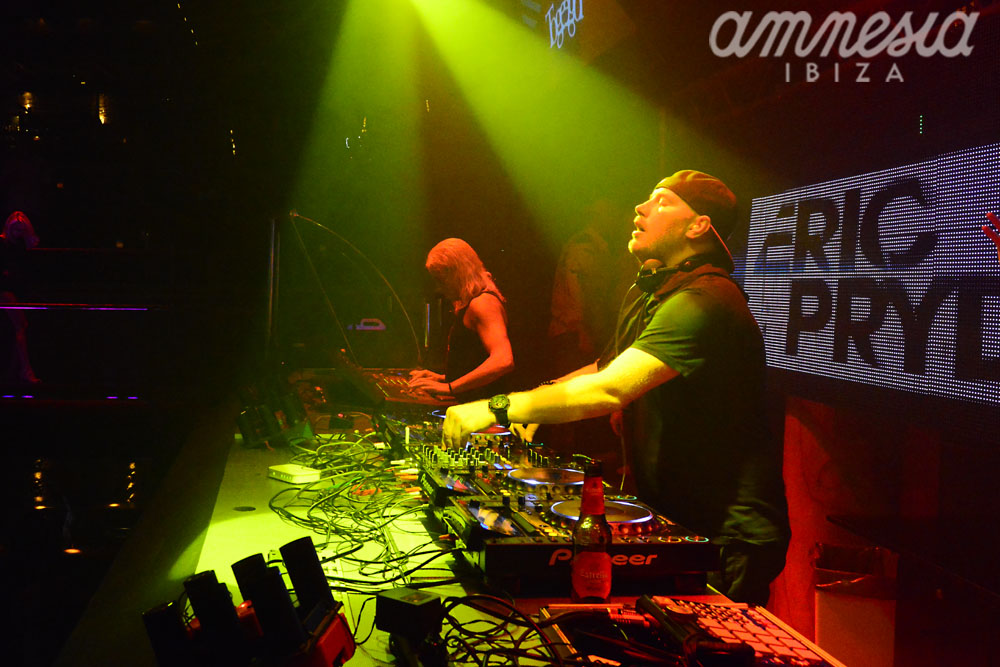
Eric Prydz performing at Amnesia in Ibiza, 2012

2014 was the 10th year of Prydz's label Pryda Recordings, and, as a result, on 9 January 2014, Prydz announced a special upcoming artist album which was initially due for release later that year. On 4 May 2015, Prydz announced PR(10)DA, a collection of unreleased tracks from January 2004 to December 2014. PR(10)DA was released over three EPs, leading up to an album release in February 2016.

On 19 May 2014, Prydz announced via social media the third installment of his concert, Eric Prydz in Concert, titled EPIC 3.0. Promising the 'world's largest indoor hologram', new music, and new visuals, the show was to be held at Madison Square Garden during the Fall. Prydz performed his EPIC 3.0 show on 27 September 2014, playing a large range of new and unreleased material. The show incorporated a 4K 20-metre (66 ft) hologram and 32 lasers.

On 4 July 2015, Prydz was the first DJ with a set featured as a "One Mix" on Beats 1, the worldwide radio station on Apple Music.

On 5 February 2016, Prydz released his debut studio album Opus.

On 28 June 2016, Prydz collaborated with Luke Versalko from Mashable to produce a short documentary that details the making of his Epic 4.0 show. In June 2016, he also appeared on Insomniacs Night Owl Radio.

To celebrate the 15th anniversary of the Prydz's Pryda alias, on 10 April 2019 he announced the release of PR(15)DA, a collection of 27 songs.

On 19 July 2019, Prydz announced EPIC 6.0. This instalment of his EPIC series involved a multi-storey eight-meter-wide transparent LED holosphere, which surrounded Prydz during his performance at Tomorrowland festival. The sphere was made up of seventy-two interlocking handmade panels, which contained over 2.4 million LEDs to illuminate with galaxies, darts of electricity, and alien planets.

Prydz presented a HOLO performance at the 22nd Coachella Valley Music and Arts Festival in April 2023.

On March 15, 2025, Prydz performed "Call On Me" for the first time in 20 years as part of the "20 Years of PRYDA" show in Austin, Texas.

Aside from producing music, Prydz also runs the record labels Pryda, Pryda Friends, Pryda Presents, and Mouseville, which release most of his own music. On Pryda, he releases music as Pryda. On Mouseville Records, started in 2002, he releases techno tracks as Cirez D.

== Personal life ==
Prydz has a fear of flying, which means he mainly tours on a bus. He moved from London to Los Angeles in 2012, where he lived until his return to Sweden in 2021 after getting divorced from his former wife Sofie, with whom he has two children.

== Awards and nominations ==
Award	Year	Nominee(s)	Category	Result	Ref.
Echo Music Prize	2005	Eric Prydz	Best Dance Act	Won	
Echo Music Prize	2005	"Call on Me"	Download of the Year	Nominated	
Grammy Awards	2008	"Proper Education" (Club Mix - Radio Edit)	Best Remixed Recording, Non-Classical	Nominated	
Grammy Awards	2013	"Midnight City" (Eric Prydz Private Remix)	Best Remixed Recording, Non-Classical	Nominated	
International Dance Music Awards	2005	Eric Prydz	Best New Dance Artist (Solo)	Won	
International Dance Music Awards	2005	"Call on Me"	Best House/Garage Track	Nominated	
International Dance Music Awards	2005	"Call on Me"	Best Pop Dance Track	Nominated	
International Dance Music Awards	2005	"Call on Me"	Best Dance Video	Won	
International Dance Music Awards	2006	"Call on Me"	Best Underground Dance Track	Nominated	
International Dance Music Awards	2008	"Proper Education"	Best Breaks/Electro Track	Nominated	
International Dance Music Awards	2009	"Pjanoo"	Best Underground Dance Track	Won	
International Dance Music Awards	2009	"Pjanoo"	Best House/Garage Track	Nominated	
International Dance Music Awards	2009	"Pjanoo"	Best Music Video	Nominated	
International Dance Music Awards	2013	"Every Day"	Best Progressive Track	Nominated	
International Dance Music Awards	2013	Epic Radio	Best Podcast	Nominated	
International Dance Music Awards	2014	Eric Prydz	Best European DJ	Nominated	
International Dance Music Awards	2014	Eric Prydz	Best EDM/Pop DJ	Nominated	
International Dance Music Awards	2015	Eric Prydz	Best Progressive House/Electro DJ	Nominated	
International Dance Music Awards	2016	Eric Prydz	Best Progressive House/Electro DJ	Nominated	
International Dance Music Awards	2016	"Tether" (vs. Chvrches)	Best Alternative/Indie Rock Dance Track	Won	
International Dance Music Awards	2016	"Generate"	Best Electro/Progressive House Track	Nominated	

== Discography ==
Studio albums

- Opus (2016)

== DJ Magazine Top 100 ==
Year	Position	Notes	Ref.
2005	187	Non Entry	
2006	123	Non Entry (Up 64)	
2007	36	New Entry (Up 87)	
2008	21	Up 15	
2009	34	Down 13	
2010	30	Up 4	
2011	46	Down 16	
2012	52	Down 8	
2013	54	Down 2	
2014	60	Down 6	
2015	57	Up 3	
2016	66	Down 9	
2017	34	Up 32	
2018	20	Up 14	
2019	17	Up 3	
2020	22	Down 5	
2021	31	Down 9	
2022	29	Up 2	
2023	39	Down 10	
2024	46	Down 7	
