= Pip (musician) =

American singer

- Born: Phillip Andrew Arnold; April 26, 1992 (age 34); Marietta, Georgia
- Genres: Pop, rock
- Occupations: Singer, musician, actor
- Instruments: Vocals, piano
- Years active: 2011–present
- Website: www.pipmusic.com

Phillip Andrew Arnold (born April 26, 1992, in Marietta, Georgia), known professionally as Pip, is an American, funk-pop artist who participated in season 2 of The Voice as part of Team Adam Levine.

== Early life ==
During their childhood, Pip was interested in music, reading, lacrosse, and Boy Scouts of America, attaining the rank of Eagle Scout in 2009.

Pip's musical aspirations were fostered by their older sister who holds a degree in musical theater. Growing up in a large musical family Pip learned to play various instruments, mainly piano, sang lead in local shows, and performed/entertained in the Marietta area. During four years at Kennesaw Mountain High School Pip starred in several plays, landing the lead of Huckleberry Finn during their senior year in the musical Big River.

== The Glee Project and The Voice ==
Pip auditioned in 2011 for Oxygen show The Glee Project Season 1, landing a spot only on the first episode's audition rounds. In 2011 Pip was chosen as 1 of 5 select performers from Atlanta's 11alive "The Voice" VIP Early Auditions Contest (Pip was selected during a blind audition by co-host Chesley McNeil). Pip moved forward into national auditions and was picked as 1 of 120 contestants to fly out to Studio City, California for the blind auditions of NBCUniversal TV reality show The Voice.

Pip first appeared in episode 3 of season 2, auditioning with the song "The House of the Rising Sun". Judges Adam Levine, Blake Shelton, Cee Lo Green and Christina Aguilera all turned around for Pip; they picked Levine.

Pip competed on "Team Adam" on season 2 of The Voice, retaining their status on the team by winning the "Battle Rounds" against Nathan Parrett, singing Amy Winehouse's "You Know I'm No Good". They performed The Killers' song "When You Were Young" on the live shows, moving on in the competition with teammates Tony Lucca, Katrina Parker, and Mathai . On April 23, 2012, they performed Keane's "Somewhere Only We Know" for the quarter-finals, but was instantly eliminated by Levine at the end of the show. Despite being eliminated they reappeared on the season 2 finale performing "I Want You Back" on stage with Jermaine Paul, Jamar Rogers, and James Massone.

== After The Voice ==
After The Voice, Pip moved to Los Angeles to continue their music career. Pip's debut single, "Who Cares", was released September 11, 2012. It is the lead single from their debut EP No Formalities, released on January 4, 2013.

In February 2014, Pip signed a deal with Indi.com to start marketing and distributing music on a bigger scale. Releasing the single "Hooked" on May 19, 2014, with an EP and possible tour in the works for later in 2014. Indi.com was backing Pip's single "Trash Talk", partnering it with a new music video and anti-bullying campaign.

In November 2015, Pip joined the cast of For The Record: The Brat Pack on Norwegian Escape, as "The Geek", a role they would later reprise in November 2016.

Pip has also been involved in making movies with long time collaborator Nanea Miyata. They served as First Assistant Director on Christmas Harmony (2018), where they also appeared in a minor role, and once again in Dead In The Water (2021) which they also wrote and released their single "Burn" for.

Pip was also part of a NYC-based wedding/event band for several years called "The Chromantics"

== Personal life ==
In 2012, Pip set up a charity called Youth in Mission to help fund youth involvement in mission work around the world, in honor of their mentor, missionary, and close family friend, the late Stewart Hay. In 2014 the charity became a non-profit corporation, with Pip as president. Pip currently resides in New York City. Pip is openly gay.

== Discography ==
=== Extended plays ===
- 2014: No Formalities

=== Singles ===
- 2014: "Hooked"
- 2021: "Burn"
- 2022: "Nothing / Sad N Stuff"

=== Featured ===
- 2022: "Beam Me Up" by Mystery Skulls
