= Erin Martin =

American singer (born 1983)

LIANA LUXE
- Born: Lyanna Erin Martin; October 14, 1983 (age 42); Berrien Springs, Michigan, U.S.
- Genres: Pop, folk-pop, indie pop, R&B
- Occupations: Musician, reality television star, model
- Years active: 2007-present
- Label: The Altera Group
- Website: lianaluxe.com

Lyanna Erin Martin, born October 14, 1983, known professionally as LIANA LUXE, is an American musician, reality television star and model. Best known for her appearances as a contestant on the hit VH1 celebreality show Rock of Love with Bret Michaels season 2, and as a contestant on the second season of The Voice; where she would be a part of Team CeeLo Green.

== Early life ==
Martin was born in Berrien Springs, Michigan to a Scottish-Irish father and an Afro-Cuban mother. For 10 years, her father was the president of a local playhouse that enabled Martin to be involved in musical theatre. When she wasn't involved in theatre productions she participated in renaissance fairs. Martin began playing piano at the age of 12, she also began playing the guitar in 2007 after being gifted an electric guitar and AMP from a friend.

Martin moved to Chicago at the age of 17, she attended Lake Michigan College. She later received her associate of arts degree from Ivy Tech, and also attended Indiana University South Bend.

== Modeling career ==
Martin began modeling at the age of 14. She signed with several modeling agencies such as; Aria, Elite Chicago and Ford Models. Martin mostly modeled in commercials and print advertisements, some brands she modeled for included; Carson Pirie Scott, Crate & Barrel, Kohl's, Noxzema, Pepsi, Roots & Always and Whirlpool. Martin was also featured in several magazines such as; Flor Magazine, Shore Magazine and Time Out Chicago. She was also the cover girl for issues of; Chicago Magazine, New City and Red Eye.

In 2025 Martin entered in Maxim's official 2025 cover girl competition.

== Television career ==
In 2008 Martin was a contestant on the hit VH1 celebreality series Rock of Love with Bret Michaels season 2. Martin was eliminated in the first episode placing 17th. Despite being eliminated episode 1, she was one of the 4 contestants to receive a V.I.P pass from Michaels. In a later interview Martin explained why she was eliminated, stating quote; "He said I was too innocent and I didn't fit in with any of the other girls. But he also said my music was more important than the show and that being on the show could ruin my career, so he kicked me off."

In 2012 Martin was a contestant on the second season of NBC's The Voice. The blind auditions, Martin performed "Hey There Delilah" by Plain White T's. Judges Blake Shelton and CeeLo Green pushed the "I Want You" buttons, both wanting her on their teams. Green commented on Martin's voice being bizarre, strange and unique stating it was wonderful. Shelton commented that Martin is what The Voice is all about. Martin ultimately chose Green as her coach and became 1 of 12 contestants in "Team Cee Lo". For the battle round Green paired Martin up with The Shield Brothers to sing Tina Turner's hit, "What's Love Got To Do With It". The decision surprised many views as The Shield Brothers are a Rock 'n' Roll duo, while Martin was a folk/pop singer. Adam Levine commented on the battle claiming Martin's was a unique approach, but ultimately deciding to go with The Shield Brothers. Christina Aguilera also went on to side with The Shield Brothers. Both Green and Shelton chose Martin, eventually advancing her to the live shows; which saw Martin trending worldwide on Twitter. For the live show, Martin performed "Walk Like an Egyptian" by The Bangles. Aguilera and Shelton were critical of the performance but both reaffirmed that Martin did have a special and unique voice. During the results show it was announced that Martin was in the bottom 3 alongside; Cheesa and Tony Vincent. Martin performed "Your Song" by Sir Elton John as her "Last Chance Performance". Green chose to save Cheesa, eliminating both Martin and Vincent.

| Episode | Round | Song | Result |
|---|---|---|---|
| 3 | Audition | "Hey There Delilah" | Safe |
| 8 | Battle Round | "What's Love Got To Do With It" | Safe |
| 12 | Live Performance | "Walk Like an Egyptian" | Bottom 3 |
| 13 | Last Chance Performance | "Your Song" | Eliminated |

== Music career ==
In 2009 Martin was the lead vocalists for Roy Davis Jr's singles "I Have a Vision" and "What Cha Gonna Do". "I Have a Vision" placed 3rd in the official UK dance charts.

In 2011 Martin released her single "Two Come Together". She released a second single in 2011 titled "Balloon" which was featured in an episode of ABC's Pretty Little Liars, she also released a third single titled "Firestarter". Furthermore she released 2 EP's titled Kinder Than Silence and Marianne. In 2016 she released another single titled "One Day".

Martin began writing and producing the LIANA LUXE project and released her first single "Mary Anne" to all streaming platforms in January 2024. "Mary Anne" was recorded and produced by Grammy Award-winning and Hip-Hop legend Ernest Dion (No I.D.) Wilson. Sterling Stacy (Lil' Baby Don Toliver) contributed as vocal, mixing and mastering engineer. She released a second single in 2024 titled "Cold".

== Personal life ==
At 10 years old Martin was diagnosed with ulcerative colitis. An inflammatory bowel disease that affects the lining of the large intestines and rectum. After 4 years of suffering from the disease, Martin had successful surgery to remove her intestine.

== Filmography ==
=== Film and television ===
| Year | Title | Role | Notes |
|---|---|---|---|
| 2007 | What Goes Around | | Short film |
| 2008 | Rock of Love with Bret Michaels season 2 | Self, contestant | 17th place, 2 episodes |
| 2012 | The Voice season 2 | Self, contestant | 18th place, 4 episodes |
| 2012 | The Tonight Show with Jay Leno | Self, vocalist | 1 episode |
| 2013 | One Small Hitch | Jazz singer | |

== Discography ==
| Year | Title | Notes |
|---|---|---|
| 2009 | I Have a Vision | Lead vocalist |
| 2009 | What Cha Gonna Do | Lead vocalist, number 3 on UK dance charts |
| 2011 | Balloon | Debut single |
| 2011 | Firestarter | Single |
| 2011 | Kinder Than Silence | Debut EP |
| 2011 | Marianne | EP |
| 2016 | One Day | Single |
| 2024 | Mary Anne | Single |
| 2024 | Cold | Single |

== See also ==
- List of people diagnosed with ulcerative colitis
