= The Voice (American TV series) season 2 =

The Voice
- Season 2
- Promotional poster featuring coaches Shelton, Green, Aguilera, and Levine
- Hosted by: Carson Daly; Christina Milian (social media)
- Coaches: Adam Levine; CeeLo Green; Christina Aguilera; Blake Shelton
- No. of contestants: 48 artists
- Winner: Jermaine Paul
- Winning coach: Blake Shelton
- Runner-up: Juliet Simms

Release
- Original network: NBC
- Original release: February 5 – May 8, 2012

Season chronology
- ← Previous; Season 1 Next → Season 3

The second season of the American reality talent show The Voice premiered on NBC on February 5, 2012, in the 10 p.m. ET slot immediately following coverage of Super Bowl XLVI. The first promo aired on NBC on Saturday, October 8, 2011, during an episode of Saturday Night Live.

The show sought artists (solo and duos) that perform various types of music: pop, rock, R&B, hip-hop, alternative, Latin, country, blues, and indie. Auditions were held July 15 to August 31, 2011, in Chicago, New York, San Francisco, Los Angeles, Houston, Atlanta, Nashville, and Orlando.

All four coaches returned for their second season. The season expanded from the first season, where each coach has 12 artists (a usual size on almost all seasons) on their team, up from eight as in the first season. The blind auditions and the battle rounds were ballso extended.

Executive producer Mark Burnett also claimed that a results show would air on Tuesday nights for the second season.

The season premiered on Sunday, February 5, 2012, immediately following Super Bowl XLVI; Jermaine Paul was named the winner of the season, marking Blake Shelton's first win as a coach. Paul was also the second African-American male winner and the first winner from New York.

== Coaches and hosts ==
All four of the original coaches returned for this season. Carson Daly, the host of the show, also returned. Alison Haislip was replaced by singer and actress Christina Milian as the show's social media correspondent, increasing the show's involvement with its fans and offering behind the scenes information and news that would only be given by her. Celebrity guest mentors also worked with the four coaches during the battle rounds.

Coaches and Host(s) of The Voice Season 2

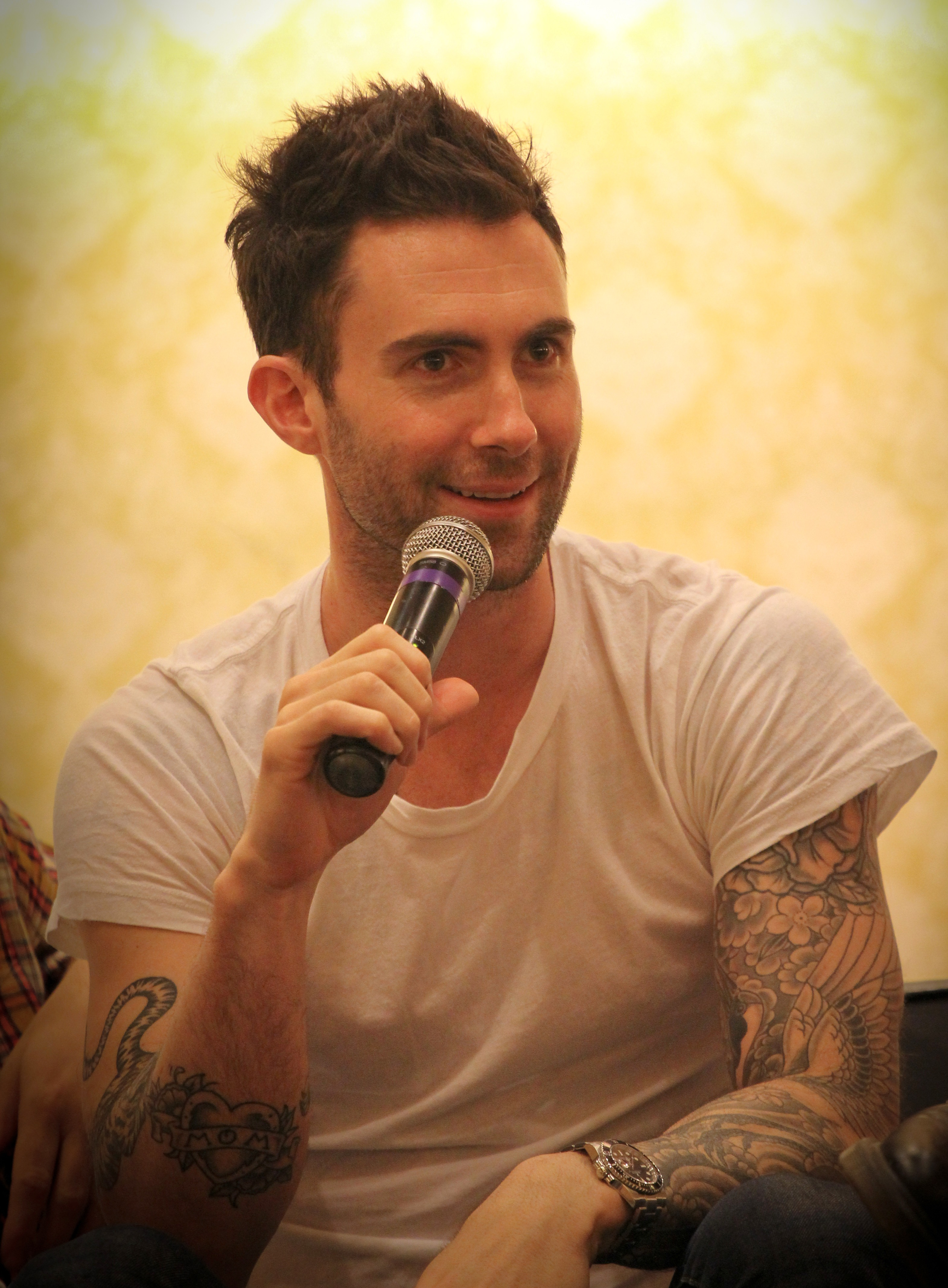
Adam Levine

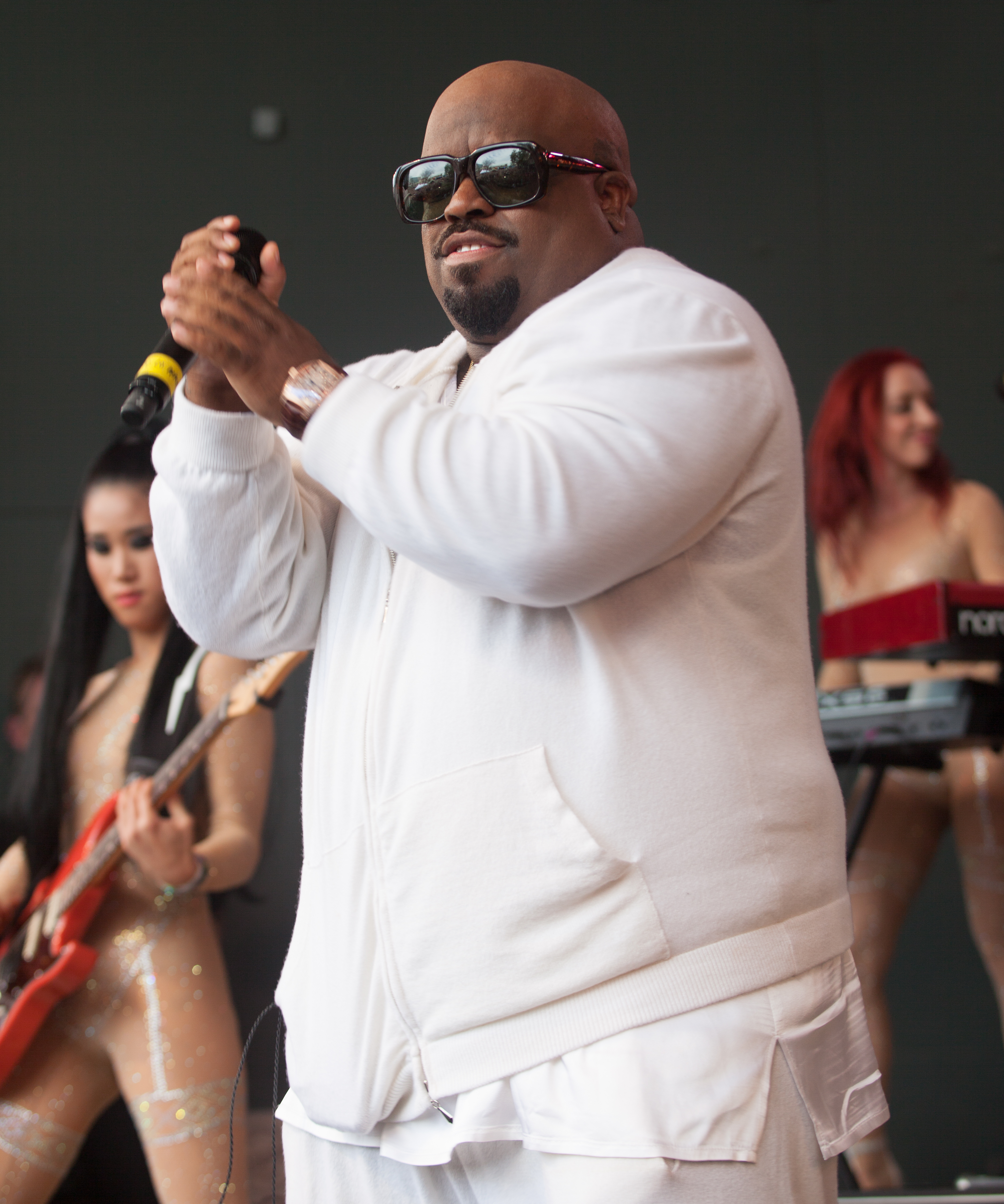
CeeLo Green

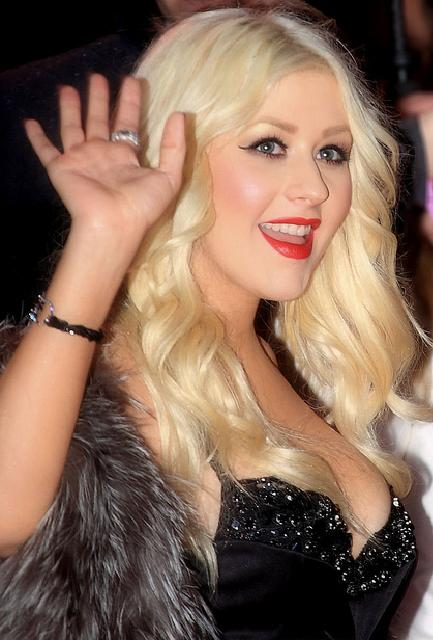
Christina Aguilera

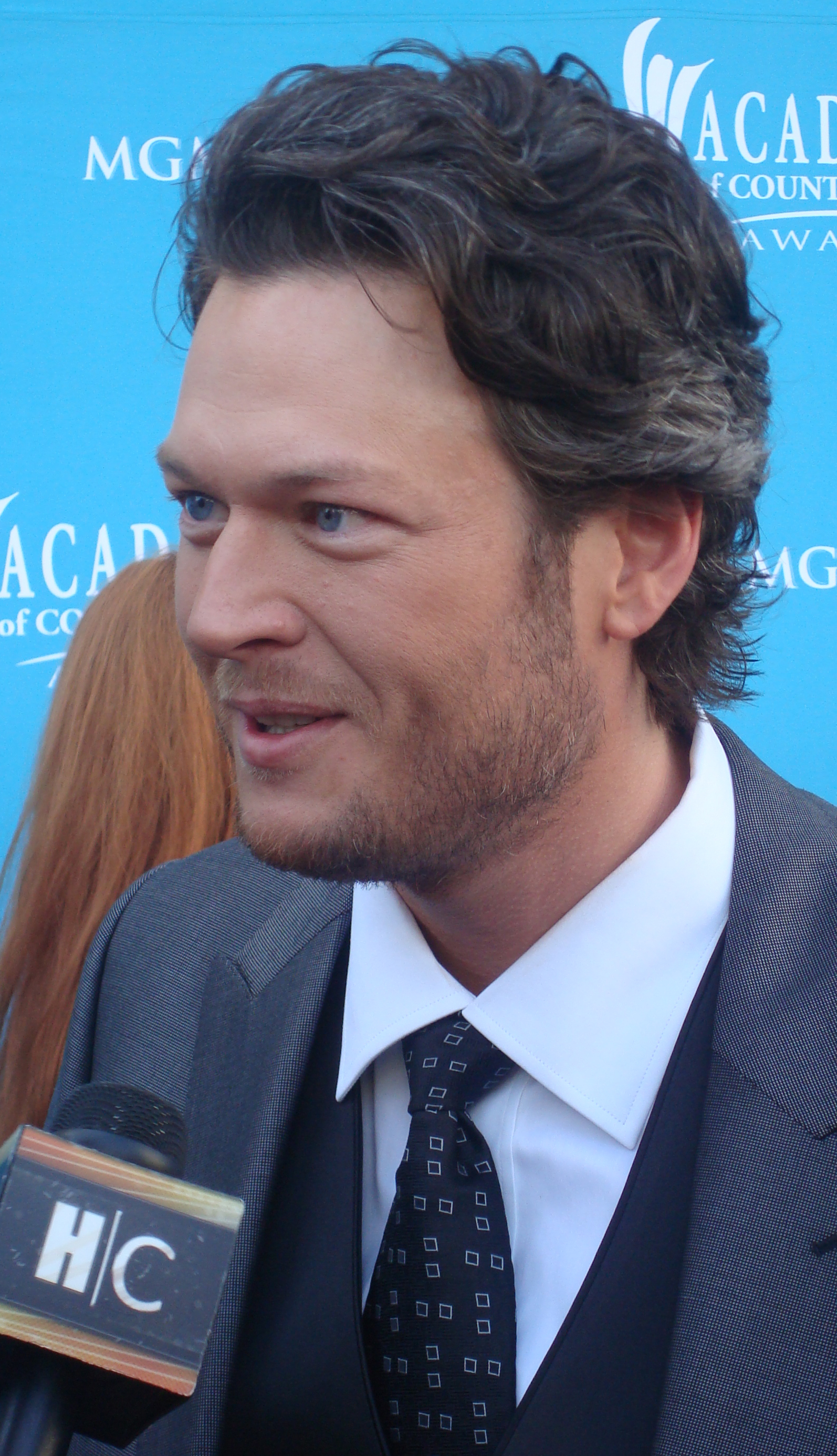
Blake Shelton

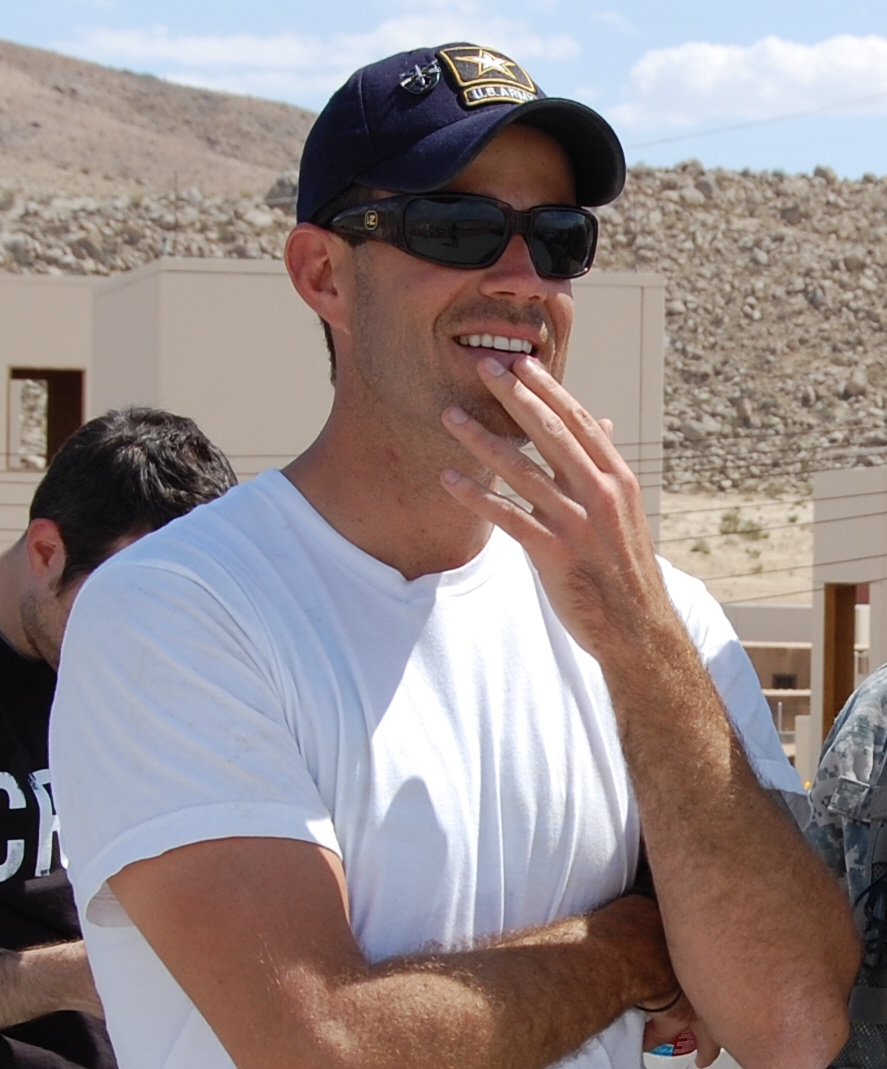
Carson Daly (Host)

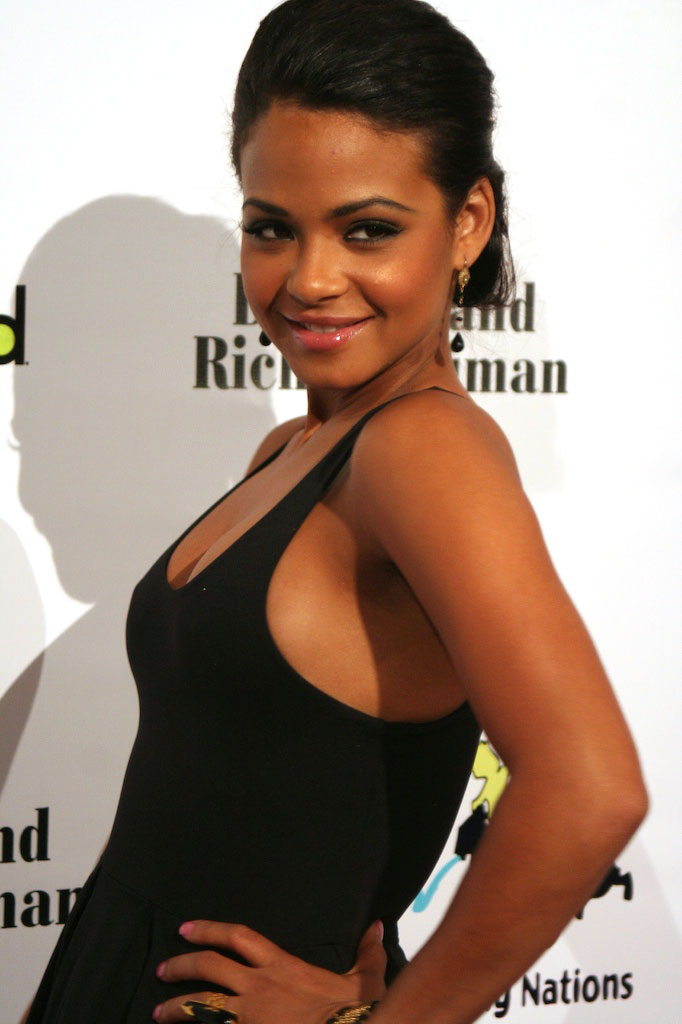
Christina Milian (Backstage)

== Auditions ==
Cities where the auditions were held.

Auditions took place in the following cities:

Location	Date	Venue
Chicago	July 15 & 16, 2011	Navy Pier
East Rutherford, New Jersey	July 22 & 23, 2011	Izod Center
Nashville, Tennessee	July 29 & 30, 2011	Nashville Municipal Auditorium
Atlanta, Georgia	August 5, 2011	Atlanta Convention Center at AmericasMart
Orlando, Florida	August 11, 2011	Loews Royal Pacific Resort
Houston, Texas	August 17, 2011	Reliant Center
South San Francisco, California	August 23, 2011	South San Francisco Conference Center
Inglewood, California	August 30 & 31, 2011	The Forum

== Teams ==
Color key

- Winner
- Runner-up
- Third place
- Fourth place
- Eliminated in the Live Shows
- Eliminated in the Battles

Coaches	Top 48 Artists					
Adam Levine						
Adam Levine	Tony Lucca	Katrina Parker	Sharon Mathai	Pip Arnold	Karla Davis	Kim Yarbrough
Adam Levine	Chris Cauley	Nicolle Galyon	Whitney Myer	Orlando Napier	Nathan Parrett	Angel Taylor
CeeLo Green						
CeeLo Green	Juliet Simms	Jamar Rogers	Cheesa	James Massone	Erin Martin	Tony Vincent
CeeLo Green	Sarah Golden	Justin Hopkins	Angie Johnson	Jamie Lono	The Shields Brothers	WADE Brown
Christina Aguilera						
Christina Aguilera	Chris Mann	Lindsey Pavao	Ashley de la Rosa	Jesse Campbell	Sera Hill	Moses Stone
Christina Aguilera	Monique Benabou	Anthony Evans	Jonathas	Lee Koch	The Line	Geoff McBride
Blake Shelton						
Blake Shelton	Jermaine Paul	Erin Willett	RaeLynn	Jordis Unga	Naia Kete	Charlotte Sometimes
Blake Shelton	ALyX Vance	Brian Fuente	Lex Land	Gwen Sebastian	Jordan Rager	Adley Stump

== Blind auditions ==
Color key

✔	Coach hit his/her "I WANT YOU" button
	Artist defaulted to this coach's team
	Artist selected to join this coach's team
	Artist eliminated with no coach pressing his or her "I WANT YOU" button

=== Episode 1 (Feb. 5) ===
Order	Artist	Age	Hometown	Song	Coach's and artist's choices			
Order	Artist	Age	Hometown	Song	Adam	CeeLo	Christina	Blake
1	RaeLynn	17	Baytown, Texas	"Hell on Heels"	✔	—	—	✔
2	Jesse Campbell	42	Maywood, Illinois	"A Song for You"	✔	✔	✔	✔
3	Daniel Rosa	21	Riverside, California	"Animal"	—	—	—	—
4	Juliet Simms	25	Clearwater, Florida	"Oh! Darling"	✔	✔	✔	—
5	Chris Mann	29	Wichita, Kansas	"Because We Believe"	—	✔	✔	—
6	Gönül Aksoy	30	New York City, New York	"Tainted Love"	—	—	—	—
7	Ben Baxter	23	Belton, Texas	"I'll Be"	—	—	—	—
8	Mark Trussell	23	Nashville, Tennessee	"Baby"	—	—	—	—
9	Tony Lucca	35	Waterford, Michigan	"Trouble"	✔	✔	✔	✔

=== Episode 2 (Feb. 6) ===
The coaches performed a medley of Prince songs at the start of the show. The songs included were "1999," "Little Red Corvette," "I Wanna Be Your Lover," and "Kiss", sung by Christina Aguilera, CeeLo Green, Adam Levine, and Blake Shelton, respectively.

Order	Artist	Age	Hometown	Song	Coach's and artist's choices			
Order	Artist	Age	Hometown	Song	Adam	CeeLo	Christina	Blake
1	The Line (Hailey Steele and Leland Grant)	N/A	Nashville, Tennessee	"American Girl"	✔	✔	✔	✔
2	Jamar Rogers	29	New York City, New York	"Seven Nation Army"	—	✔	—	—
3	Neal Middleton	33	Salt Lake City, Utah	"I Heard It Through the Grapevine"	—	—	—	—
4	TJ Gibson	N/A	Centerville, Ohio	"Calling All Angels"	—	—	—	—
5	Aly Jados	N/A	N/A	"Because the Night"	—	—	—	—
6	Sam James	25	Worcester, Massachusetts	"I Don't Want to Be"	—	—	—	—
7	Gwen Sebastian	37	Hebron, North Dakota	"Stay"	✔	✔	—	✔
8	Pamela Rose	28	Cooper City, Florida	"Already Gone"	—	—	—	—
9	Kim Yarbrough	50	Los Angeles, California	"Tell Me Something Good"	✔	—	✔	—
10	Angie Johnson	31	St. Louis, Missouri	"Heartbreaker"	—	✔	—	—
11	Dez Duron	21	Shreveport, Louisiana	"I Want It That Way"	—	—	—	—
12	Lindsey Pavao	22	Sacramento, California	"Say Aah"	—	✔	✔	✔
13	Hoja Lopez	25	Houston, Texas	"Teenage Dream"	—	—	—	—
14	Jermaine Paul	33	Orange County, New York	"Complicated"	—	✔	—	✔
15	Angel Taylor	23	Los Angeles, California	"Someone Like You"	✔	✔	—	✔

=== Episode 3 (Feb. 13) ===
Order	Artist	Age	Hometown	Song	Coach's and artist's choices			
Order	Artist	Age	Hometown	Song	Adam	CeeLo	Christina	Blake
1	Sarah Golden	27	Houston, Texas	"You and I"	—	✔	—	✔
2	Elley Duhé	19	Vancleave, Mississippi	"Mercy"	—	—	—	—
3	Pip	19	Marietta, Georgia	"The House of the Rising Sun"	✔	✔	✔	✔
4	Erin Willett	22	Gaithersburg, Maryland	"I Want You Back"	—	—	—	✔
5	David Grace	28	Santa Fe, Texas	"Sweet Home Alabama"	—	—	—	—
6	Katrina Parker	34	Los Angeles, California	"One of Us"	✔	—	—	—
7	Geoff McBride	51	Santa Rosa Beach, Florida	"Higher Ground"	—	✔	✔	—
8	Erin Martin	27	Chicago, Illinois	"Hey There Delilah"	—	✔	—	✔
9	James Massone	23	Wakefield, Massachusetts	"Find Your Love"	—	✔	✔	✔
10	Winter Rae	26	Los Angeles, California	"Take a Bow"	—	—	—	—
11	Chris Cauley	27	Atlanta, Georgia	"Grenade"	✔	✔	—	—
12	Nathan Parrett	24	Los Angeles, California	"The Joker"	✔	—	—	—
13	Brian Fuente	24	Nashville, Tennessee	"Paris (Ooh La La)"	—	—	—	✔
14	Moses Stone	26	Maryland	"Let's Get It Started"	—	—	✔	—
15	Jordis Unga	29	Los Angeles, California	"Maybe I'm Amazed"	—	✔	✔	✔

=== Episode 4 (Feb. 20) ===
Order	Artist	Age	Hometown	Song	Coach's and artist's choices			
Order	Artist	Age	Hometown	Song	Adam	CeeLo	Christina	Blake
1	Ducky	26	Carlisle, Pennsylvania	"Tighten Up"	—	—	—	—
2	Jonathas	24	Rio de Janeiro, Brazil	"U Got It Bad"	—	✔	✔	—
3	Monique Benabou	23	Alameda, California	"Mr. Know It All"	—	—	✔	—
4	Naia Kete	21	Santa Monica, California	"The Lazy Song"	—	✔	—	✔
5	Erick Macek	31	Bethlehem, Pennsylvania	"Free Fallin'"	—	—	—	—
6	Charlotte Sometimes	23	Wall, New Jersey	"Apologize"	✔	✔	✔	✔
7	Tony Vincent	38	New York City, New York	"We Are the Champions"	—	✔	—	—
8	Anthony Evans	33	Dallas, Texas	"What's Going On"	—	—	✔	—
9	Jamie Lono	22	Chicago, Illinois	"Folsom Prison Blues"	✔	✔	—	—
10	Dylan Chambers	19	Arlington, Texas	"Valerie"	—	—	—	—
11	Nathan Anderson	N/A	Collierville, Tennessee	"Walking in Memphis"	—	—	—	—
12	Luna Searles	N/A	N/A	"Come to My Window"	—	—	—	—
13	Adam Lasher	N/A	Los Angeles, California	"How You Remind Me"	—	—	—	—
14	Justin Hopkins	30	Tigard, Oregon	"Babylon"	—	✔	—	—
15	Nicolle Galyon	27	Sterling, Kansas	"You Save Me"	✔	—	—	—
16	Ashley de la Rosa	17	Orlando, Florida	"Shark in the Water"	—	—	✔	—
17	Jordan Rager	17	Loganville, Georgia	"Chicken Fried"	—	—	—	✔
18	ALyX	19	Dallas, Texas	"Just Like a Pill"	—	—	—	✔
19	Karla Davis	25	Monroe, North Carolina	"If I Die Young"	✔	—	—	—
20	Eric Tipton	31	Sanger, Texas	"You Make My Dreams"	—	—	—	—
21	Mathai	18	Dallas, Texas	"Rumour Has It"	✔	✔	—	✔

=== Episode 5 (Feb. 27) ===
Order	Artist	Age	Hometown	Song	Coach's and artist's choices			
Order	Artist	Age	Hometown	Song	Adam	CeeLo	Christina	Blake
1	Whitney Myer	25	Reno, Nevada	"No One"	✔	✔	✔	✔
2	David Dunn	27	Midland, Texas	"The Man Who Can't Be Moved"	—	—	—	—
3	The Shields Brothers (Tristen & Rory)	N/A	Rixeyville, Virginia	"Dancing with Myself"	—	✔	—	—
4	Cheesa	21	Honolulu, Hawaii	"If I Were a Boy"	—	✔	—	—
5	Preston Shannon	64	Memphis, Tennessee	"In the Midnight Hour"	—	—	—	—
6	Lex Land	24	Austin, Texas	"I Can't Make You Love Me"	✔	✔	—	✔
7	Cameron Novack	28	St. Louis, Missouri	"You Oughta Know"	—	—	—	—
8	Orlando Napier	25	Los Angeles, California	"Waiting on the World to Change"	✔	—	—	—
9	Lee Koch	27	Temecula, California	"Like a Rolling Stone"	Team full	—	✔	—
10	WADE	19	Harvest, Alabama	"Rehab"	Team full	✔	—	—
11	Adley Stump	21	Tulsa, Oklahoma	"Last Name"	Team full	Team full	✔	✔
12	Beta	N/A	N/A	"You Make Me Feel..."	Team full	Team full	—	Team full|
13	Aaron Gordon	N/A	Kelowna, British Columbia, Canada	"So Sick"	Team full	Team full	—	Team full|
14	Lana Lowe	N/A	Beaumont, Texas	"Last Friday Night (T.G.I.F.)"	Team full	Team full	—	Team full|
15	Sera Hill	24	Atlanta, Georgia	"I'm Goin' Down"	Team full	Team full	✔	Team full|

== The Battles ==
After the Blind Auditions, each coach had 12 artists for the Battle Rounds, airing from March 5 to March 26.

As with the previous season, celebrity guest mentors worked with the coaches during the battle rounds. The four coaches began narrowing down the playing field by training the artists with the help of the mentors.

Color key

Artist won the Battle and advances to the Live shows
Artist lost the Battle and was eliminated

Episode & Date	Coach	Order	Winner	Song	Loser
Episode 6 (Monday, March 5, 2012)	Adam Levine	1	Tony Lucca	"Beautiful Day"	Chris Cauley
Episode 6 (Monday, March 5, 2012)	Blake Shelton	2	RaeLynn	"Free Fallin'"	Adley Stump
Episode 6 (Monday, March 5, 2012)	Christina Aguilera	3	Chris Mann	"The Power of Love"	Monique Benabou
Episode 6 (Monday, March 5, 2012)	CeeLo Green	4	Cheesa	"Total Eclipse of the Heart"	Angie Johnson
Episode 6 (Monday, March 5, 2012)	Blake Shelton	5	Jordis Unga	"Ironic"	Brian Fuente
Episode 6 (Monday, March 5, 2012)	Christina Aguilera	6	Jesse Campbell	"If I Ain't Got You"	Anthony Evans
Episode 7 (Monday, March 12, 2012)	Christina Aguilera	1	Sera Hill	"Chain of Fools"	Geoff McBride
Episode 7 (Monday, March 12, 2012)	Blake Shelton	2	Charlotte Sometimes	"Pumped Up Kicks"	Lex Land
Episode 7 (Monday, March 12, 2012)	CeeLo Green	3	Juliet Simms	"Stay with Me"	Sarah Golden
Episode 7 (Monday, March 12, 2012)	Adam Levine	4	Kim Yarbrough	"No More Drama"	Whitney Myer
Episode 7 (Monday, March 12, 2012)	Christina Aguilera	5	Lindsey Pavao	"Heart-Shaped Box"	Lee Koch
Episode 7 (Monday, March 12, 2012)	CeeLo Green	6	Jamar Rogers	"I Want to Know What Love Is"	Jamie Lono
Episode 8 (Monday, March 19, 2012)	Adam Levine	1	Pip	"You Know I'm No Good"	Nathan Parrett
Episode 8 (Monday, March 19, 2012)	CeeLo Green	2	Erin Martin	"What's Love Got to Do with It"	The Shields Brothers
Episode 8 (Monday, March 19, 2012)	Christina Aguilera	3	Ashley de la Rosa	"No Air"	Jonathas
Episode 8 (Monday, March 19, 2012)	Blake Shelton	4	Jermaine Paul	"Get Outta My Dreams, Get into My Car"	ALyX
Episode 8 (Monday, March 19, 2012)	Adam Levine	5	Katrina Parker	"Bleeding Love"	Angel Taylor
Episode 8 (Monday, March 19, 2012)	Blake Shelton	6	Erin Willett	"We Belong"	Gwen Sebastian
Episode 9 (Monday, March 26, 2012)	CeeLo Green	1	James Massone	"True Colors"	WADE
Episode 9 (Monday, March 26, 2012)	Adam Levine	2	Mathai	"Love Song"	Nicolle Galyon
Episode 9 (Monday, March 26, 2012)	Christina Aguilera	3	Moses Stone	"(I Can't Get No) Satisfaction"	The Line
Episode 9 (Monday, March 26, 2012)	Adam Levine	4	Karla Davis	"Easy"	Orlando Napier
Episode 9 (Monday, March 26, 2012)	Blake Shelton	5	Naia Kete	"I'm Yours"	Jordan Rager
Episode 9 (Monday, March 26, 2012)	CeeLo Green	6	Tony Vincent	"Faithfully"	Justin Hopkins

The advisors for these episodes were as follows: Alanis Morissette and Robin Thicke for Team Adam; Kelly Clarkson and Miranda Lambert for Team Blake; Kenneth "Babyface" Edmonds and Ne-Yo for Team CeeLo; and Jewel and Lionel Richie for Team Christina. Each advisor was partnered with one artist (for a total of six) as follows:

Coach	Adviser	Artists					
Adam Levine	Alanis Morissette	Chris Cauley	Whitney Myer	Pip	Katrina Parker	Mathai	Karla Davis
Adam Levine	Robin Thicke	Tony Lucca	Kim Yarbrough	Nathan Parrett	Angel Taylor	Nicolle Galyon	Orlando Napier
Blake Shelton	Kelly Clarkson	Adley Stump	Brian Fuente	Charlotte Sometimes	Jermaine Paul	Erin Willett	Naia Kete
Blake Shelton	Miranda Lambert	RaeLynn	Jordis Unga	Lex Land	ALyX	Gwen Sebastian	Jordan Rager
CeeLo Green	Babyface	Cheesa	Sarah Golden	Jamie Lono	The Shields Brothers	WADE	Tony Vincent
CeeLo Green	Ne-Yo	Angie Johnson	Juliet Simms	Jamar Rogers	Erin Martin	James Massone	Justin Hopkins
Christina Aguilera	Jewel	Monique Benabou	Anthony Evans	Sera Hill	Lee Koch	Ashley de la Rosa	THE LiNE
Christina Aguilera	Lionel Richie	Chris Mann	Jesse Campbell	Geoff McBride	Lindsey Pavao	Jonathas	Moses Stone

== Live shows ==
=== Week 1 (April 2 & 3) ===
The live performance show aired on Monday, April 2, 2012; the elimination show aired Tuesday, April 3, 2012. The top three artists from each team advanced based on the viewers' vote, leaving the bottom three facing the coaches' save through the Last Chance performances. The first live week show featured Team Blake and Team Christina.

Color key

Artist was saved by the public's vote
Artist was part of the bottom two or three in his/her team
Artist was saved by his/her coach
Artist was eliminated immediately by his/her coach
Artist was eliminated

Order	Coach	Artist	Song	Result
1	Blake Shelton	Jermaine Paul	"Livin' on a Prayer"	Public's vote
2	Christina Aguilera	Chris Mann	"Bridge Over Troubled Water"	Public's vote
3	Blake Shelton	RaeLynn	"Wake Up Call"	Public's vote
4	Christina Aguilera	Moses Stone	"Stronger"	Bottom three
5	Blake Shelton	Naia Kete	"Turning Tables"	Bottom three
6	Christina Aguilera	Lindsey Pavao	"Somebody That I Used to Know"	Public's vote
7	Blake Shelton	Jordis Unga	"Alone"	Bottom three
8	Christina Aguilera	Sera Hill	"Find Your Love"	Bottom three
9	Blake Shelton	Erin Willett	"Living for the City"	Public's vote
10	Christina Aguilera	Ashley de la Rosa	"Right Through You"	Bottom three
11	Blake Shelton	Charlotte Sometimes	"Misery Business"	Bottom three
12	Christina Aguilera	Jesse Campbell	"What a Wonderful World"	Public's vote
Last Chance Performances
1	Blake Shelton	Naia Kete	"If I Were a Boy"	Eliminated
2	Blake Shelton	Charlotte Sometimes	"Iris"	Eliminated
3	Blake Shelton	Jordis Unga	"Wild Horses"	Blake's Choice
4	Christina Aguilera	Ashley de la Rosa	"Paris (Ooh La La)"	Christina's Choice
5	Christina Aguilera	Sera Hill	"Vision of Love"	Eliminated
6	Christina Aguilera	Moses Stone	"Breakeven"	Eliminated

Non-competition performances
Order	Performers	Song
1	Gym Class Heroes featuring Neon Hitch and Team Adam	"Ass Back Home"

=== Week 2 (April 9 & 10) ===
The live performance show aired on Monday, April 9, 2012; the elimination show aired on Tuesday, April 10, 2012. Similar to the previous week, four artists per team advanced; the public's votes decided the top three artists, and the fourth artist advanced through the Last Chance performance. The second week featured Team Adam and Team CeeLo.

Order	Coach	Artist	Song	Result
1	Adam Levine	Katrina Parker	"Tonight, Tonight"	Bottom three
2	CeeLo Green	Cheesa	"Don't Leave Me This Way"	Bottom three
3	Adam Levine	Tony Lucca	"In Your Eyes"	Public's vote
4	Adam Levine	Kim Yarbrough	"Rolling in the Deep"	Bottom three
5	CeeLo Green	James Massone	"Don't Know Why"	Public's vote
6	CeeLo Green	Juliet Simms	"Roxanne"	Public's vote
7	Adam Levine	Mathai	"Ordinary People"	Public's vote
8	CeeLo Green	Tony Vincent	"Everybody Wants to Rule the World"	Bottom three
9	Adam Levine	Karla Davis	"Airplanes"	Bottom three
10	CeeLo Green	Erin Martin	"Walk Like an Egyptian"	Bottom three
11	Adam Levine	Pip	"When You Were Young"	Public's vote
12	CeeLo Green	Jamar Rogers	"Are You Gonna Go My Way"	Public's vote
Last Chance Performances
1	Adam Levine	Kim Yarbrough	"Spotlight"	Eliminated
2	Adam Levine	Karla Davis	"I Can't Make You Love Me"	Eliminated
3	Adam Levine	Katrina Parker	"Don't Speak"	Adam's Choice
4	CeeLo Green	Tony Vincent	"Sweet Dreams (Are Made of This)"	Eliminated
5	CeeLo Green	Cheesa	"All By Myself"	CeeLo's Choice
6	CeeLo Green	Erin Martin	"Your Song"	Eliminated

Non-competition performances
Order	Performers	Song
1	Jessie J with Team Xtina	"Domino"

=== Week 3 (April 16 & 17) ===
The live performance show aired on Monday, April 16, 2012; the elimination show aired Tuesday, April 17, 2012.

In a surprise twist, each coach was mandated to make an Instant Elimination for at least one contestant per team. The remaining three artists faced public vote; the artist with the highest vote advanced, while the other two artists competed for the coaches' save during the Last Chance performance.

The first week featured Team Blake and Team Christina.

- Guest performance: The Wanted – "Chasing the Sun" with Team Blake

Order	Coach	Artist	Song	Result
1	Blake Shelton	RaeLynn	"She's Country"	Middle two
2	Christina Aguilera	Jesse Campbell	"Halo"	Eliminated
3	Blake Shelton	Jordis Unga	"A Little Bit Stronger"	Eliminated
4	Christina Aguilera	Ashley de la Rosa	"Foolish Games"	Middle two
5	Blake Shelton	Erin Willett	"Set Fire to the Rain"	Middle two
6	Christina Aguilera	Lindsey Pavao	"Part of Me"	Middle two
7	Blake Shelton	Jermaine Paul	"Against All Odds (Take a Look at Me Now)"	Public's vote
8	Christina Aguilera	Chris Mann	"Viva la Vida"	Public's vote
Last Chance Performances
1	Christina Aguilera	Ashley de la Rosa	"You and I"	Eliminated
2	Christina Aguilera	Lindsey Pavao	"Please Don't Go"	Christina's Choice
3	Blake Shelton	Erin Willett	"Proud Mary"	Blake's Choice
4	Blake Shelton	RaeLynn	"If I Die Young"	Eliminated

Non-competition performances
Order	Performers	Song
1	Christina Aguilera, her 4 finalists (Jesse Campbell, Ashley De La Rosa, Lindsey Pavao and Chris Mann), and the Crenshaw High School choir	"Fighter"
2	Maroon 5 featuring Wiz Khalifa	"Payphone"
3	Blake Shelton and his 4 Finalists (Erin Willett, RaeLynn, Jermaine Paul and Jordis Unga)	"Heartache Tonight"

=== Week 4 (April 23 & 24) ===
The live performance show aired on Monday, April 23, 2012; the results show aired Tuesday, April 24, 2012. Similar to the previous week, coaches were mandated to instantly eliminate an artist, leaving the three remaining artists with the public's vote.

The second week featured Teams Adam and Team CeeLo.

- Guest performance: Florence and the Machine - "No Light, No Light" with Team CeeLo

Order	Coach	Artist	Song	Result
1	CeeLo Green	Jamar Rogers	"It's My Life"	Public's vote
2	Adam Levine	Katrina Parker	"Jar of Hearts"	Middle two
3	Adam Levine	Mathai	"I'm Like a Bird"	Middle two
4	CeeLo Green	James Massone	"Just the Way You Are"	Eliminated
5	Adam Levine	Tony Lucca	"...Baby One More Time"	Public's vote
6	CeeLo Green	Cheesa	"I Have Nothing"	Middle two
7	Adam Levine	Pip	"Somewhere Only We Know"	Eliminated
8	CeeLo Green	Juliet Simms	"Cryin'"	Middle two
Last Chance Performances
1	Adam Levine	Mathai	"Cowboy Casanova"	Eliminated
2	Adam Levine	Katrina Parker	"Perfect"	Adam's Choice
3	CeeLo Green	Cheesa	"Already Gone"	Eliminated
4	CeeLo Green	Juliet Simms	"Torn"	CeeLo's Choice

Non-competition performances
Order	Performers	Song
1	CeeLo Green and his 4 Finalists (Jamar Rogers, James Massone, Cheesa and Juliet Simms)	"Dancing in the Street"
2	Goodie Mob and CeeLo Green	"Fight to Win"
3	Adam Levine and his 4 finalists (Katrina Parker, Mathai, Pip, and Tony Lucca)	"Instant Karma!"

=== Week 5: Semifinals (April 30 & May 1) ===
The live performance show aired on Monday, April 30, 2012; the results show aired on Tuesday, May 1, 2012. To determine which artist advanced to the finale, the coach's score and the public vote got weighted equally. Each coach split 100 points between their remaining team members, while the public's vote was converted into a matching 100-point split. The artist from each team with the highest combined total advanced to the finals.

Season one finalists Dia Frampton, Vicci Martinez, Beverly McClellan, and Javier Colon returned on the results show to perform duets (with the exception of Colon).

Frampton performed her new single, "Don't Kick the Chair," with Kid Cudi. Martinez partnered with her season one coach CeeLo Green for her song, "Come Along." McClellan joined Cyndi Lauper to perform Lauper's "Money Changes Everything." Colon performed his newest single, "A Drop in the Ocean."

Order	Coach	Contestant	Song	Coach points	Public points	Total points	Result
1	Adam Levine	Tony Lucca	"How You Like Me Now?"	60	48	108	Advanced to Finals
2	Blake Shelton	Erin Willett	"Without You"	50	27	77	Eliminated
3	Christina Aguilera	Chris Mann	"Ave Maria"	50	54	104	Advanced to Finals
4	CeeLo Green	Jamar Rogers	"If You Don't Know Me by Now"	40	39	79	Eliminated
5	Blake Shelton	Jermaine Paul	"Open Arms"	50	73	123	Advanced to Finals
6	Adam Levine	Katrina Parker	"Killing Me Softly With His Song"	40	52	92	Eliminated
7	Christina Aguilera	Lindsey Pavao	"Skinny Love"	50	46	96	Eliminated
8	CeeLo Green	Juliet Simms	"It's a Man's Man's Man's World"	60	61	121	Advanced to Finals

Non-competition performances
Order	Performers	Song
1	Team Adam & Team CeeLo (Tony Lucca, Katrina Parker, Jamar Rogers and Juliet Simms)	"All These Things That I've Done"
2	Blake Shelton	"Over"
3	Team Blake & Team Christina (Erin Willett, Jermaine Paul, Chris Mann and Lindsey Pavao)	"The Edge of Glory"

=== Week 6: Finale (May 7 & 8) ===
The live performance show aired on Monday, May 7, 2012, with the final results show following on Tuesday, May 8, 2012. Each finalist performed a solo cover song, a duet with their coach, and a song dedicated to the coach.

Coach	Artist	Order	Solo song	Order	Coach tribute song	Order	Duet song (with Coach)	Result
Blake Shelton	Jermaine Paul	1	"I Believe I Can Fly"	8	"God Gave Me You"	10	"Soul Man"	**Winner**
CeeLo Green	Juliet Simms	12	"Free Bird"	2	"Crazy"	6	"Born to Be Wild"	Runner-up
Christina Aguilera	Chris Mann	9	"You Raise Me Up"	5	"The Voice Within"	3	"The Prayer"	Fourth place
Adam Levine	Tony Lucca	4	"99 Problems"	11	"Harder to Breathe"	7	"Yesterday"	Third place

Finale performances of the Top 4 artists
Order	Performers	Song
1	Jermaine Paul (with Pip, James Massone & Jamar Rogers)	"I Want You Back"
2	Chris Mann (with Katrina Parker & Lindsey Pavao)	"Bitter Sweet Symphony"
3	Juliet Simms (with Jamar Rogers, RaeLynn & Erin Willett)	"With A Little Help From My Friends"
4	Tony Lucca and Jordis Unga	"Go Your Own Way"

Finale performances of the Guest names
Order	Performers	Song
1.71	Flo Rida and Juliet Simms	"Whistle" and "Wild Ones"
1.72	Hall & Oates (with Chris Mann, Tony Lucca, and Jermaine Paul)	"Rich Girl"
1.73	Lady Antebellum	"Wanted You More"
1.74	Justin Bieber	"Boyfriend"

Note: The golden colored songs are the iTunes top ten bonuses as well as the bolded names.

== Elimination chart ==
Color key
Artist's info

- Team Adam
- Team CeeLo
- Team Christina
- Team Blake

Results info

- Artist was saved by the public's votes
- Artist was in the bottom 2 or bottom 3, but was saved via the Last Chance performance
- Artist was in the bottom 2 or bottom 3 and lost during their Last Chance performance
- Artist was immediately eliminated by their coach
- Artist advanced to the final
- Artist received the fewest accumulated total points and was eliminated
- Artist did not perform on that particular week

Live show results per week
Artist	Week 1 Playoffs	Week 2	Week 3	Week 4	Week 5	Week 6 Finale
Jermaine Paul	Safe		Safe		Advanced	Winner
Juliet Simms		Safe		Bottom two	Advanced	Runner-up
Tony Lucca		Safe		Safe	Advanced	3rd place
Chris Mann	Safe		Safe		Advanced	4th place
Katrina Parker		Bottom three		Bottom two	Eliminated	Eliminated (Week 5)
Lindsey Pavao	Safe		Bottom two		Eliminated	Eliminated (Week 5)
Jamar Rogers		Safe		Safe	Eliminated	Eliminated (Week 5)
Erin Willett	Safe		Bottom two		Eliminated	Eliminated (Week 5)
Cheesa		Bottom three		Bottom two	Eliminated (Week 4)	
Mathai		Safe		Bottom two	Eliminated (Week 4)	
James Massone		Safe		Eliminated	Eliminated (Week 4)	
Pip		Safe		Eliminated	Eliminated (Week 4)	
Ashley De La Rosa	Bottom three		Bottom two	Eliminated (Week 3)		
RaeLynn	Safe		Bottom two	Eliminated (Week 3)		
Jesse Campbell	Safe		Eliminated	Eliminated (Week 3)		
Jordis Unga	Bottom three		Eliminated	Eliminated (Week 3)		
Karla Davis		Bottom three	Eliminated (Week 2)			
Erin Martin		Bottom three	Eliminated (Week 2)			
Tony Vincent		Bottom three	Eliminated (Week 2)			
Kim Yarbrough		Bottom three	Eliminated (Week 2)			
Sera Hill	Bottom three	Eliminated (Week 1)				
Naia Kete	Bottom three	Eliminated (Week 1)				
Charlotte Sometimes	Bottom three	Eliminated (Week 1)				
Moses Stone	Bottom three	Eliminated (Week 1)				

== Performances by guests/coaches ==
Episode	Show segment	Performer(s)	Title	Hot 100 reaction	Hot Digital Songs reaction	Performance type
11	Live Rounds week 1 results	Gym Class Heroes ft. Neon Hitch (backed by Team Adam's Top 6)	"Ass Back Home"	17 (+2)	30 (+2)	live performance
13	Live Rounds week 2 results	Jessie J (backed by Team Christina's Top 4)	"Domino"	28 (-3)	44 (+5)	live performance
14	Quarter-Finals week 1	Maroon 5 ft. Wiz Khalifa	"Payphone"	3 (debut)	1 (debut)	live performance
15	Quarter-Final week 1 results	The Wanted (backed by Team Blake's Top 3)	"Chasing the Sun"	111 (debut)	did not chart	live performance
15	Quarter-Final week 1 results	Justin Bieber	"Boyfriend"	4 (+1)	4 (=)	music video teaser
16	Quarter-Finals week 2	Goodie Mob	"Fight to Win"	did not chart	did not chart	live performance
17	Quarter-Final week 2 results	Florence and the Machine (backed by Team CeeLo's Top 3	"No Light, No Light"	did not chart	did not chart	live performance
18	Semi-Finals	Blake Shelton	"Over"	did not chart	did not chart	live performance
19	Semi-Final results	Dia Frampton ft. Kid Cudi	"Don't Kick the Chair"	did not chart	did not chart	live performance
19	Semi-Final results	Vicci Martinez ft. Cee Lo Green	"Come Along"	did not chart	did not chart	live performance
19	Semi-Final results	Cyndi Lauper (with Beverly McClellan)	"Money Changes Everything"	did not chart	did not chart	live performance
19	Semi-Final results	Javier Colon	"A Drop in the Ocean"	did not chart	did not chart	live performance
21	Final results	Flo Rida	"Whistle"	77 (+18)	28 (+11)	live performance
21	Final results	Flo Rida (with Juliet Simms)	"Wild Ones"	5 (=)	7 (+2)	live performance
21	Final results	Hall & Oates (with Tony Lucca, Chris Mann, and Jermaine Paul)	"Rich Girl"	did not chart	did not chart	live performance
21	Final results	Lady Antebellum	"Wanted You More"	did not chart	did not chart	live performance
21	Final results	Justin Bieber	"Boyfriend"	9 (-1)	4 (+1)	live performance

== Ratings ==
Season two premiered following NBC's broadcast of Super Bowl XLVI, and was watched by 37.6 million viewers with a 16.3 rating in the key 18–49 demographic, making it the highest rated Super Bowl lead-out program since Grey's Anatomy in 2006.

#	Episode	Original air date	Production	Timeslot (ET)	Viewers (millions)	Rating/share (adults 18-49)
1	"The Blind Auditions Premiere, Part 1"	February 5, 2012	201	Sunday 10:21pm	37.61	16.3/37
2	"The Blind Auditions Premiere, Part 2"	February 6, 2012	202	Monday 8:00pm	17.84	6.7/17
3	"The Blind Auditions, Part 3"	February 13, 2012	203	Monday 8:00pm	16.28	6.0/15
4	"The Blind Auditions, Part 4"	February 20, 2012	204	Monday 8:00pm	16.04	6.0/15
5	"The Blind Auditions, Part 5"	February 27, 2012	205	Monday 8:00pm	14.89	5.4/14
6	"Let the Battles Begin"	March 5, 2012	206	Monday 8:00pm	16.85	6.2/16
7	"The Battles, Part 2"	March 12, 2012	207	Monday 8:00pm	14.51	5.2/14
8	"The Battles, Part 3"	March 19, 2012	208	Monday 8:00pm	11.95	4.6/12
9	"The Battles, Part 4"	March 26, 2012	209	Monday 8:00pm	12.00	4.5/12
10	"Live Performance, Week 1"	April 2, 2012	210	Monday 8:00pm	10.67	4.1/11
11	"Results, Week 1"	April 3, 2012	210A	Tuesday 9:00pm	8.45	3.2/9
12	"Live Performance, Week 2"	April 9, 2012	211	Monday 8:00pm	10.52	4.0/11
13	"Live Results, Four Go Home, Week 2"	April 10, 2012	211A	Tuesday 9:00pm	9.00	3.5/9
14	"The Quarterfinals, Part 1"	April 16, 2012	212	Monday 8:00pm	10.02	3.7/10
15	"Quarterfinals: Live Results"	April 17, 2012	212A	Tuesday 9:00pm	8.86	3.3/9
16	"Quarterfinals, Part 2"	April 23, 2012	213	Monday 8:00pm	10.31	3.8/10
17	"Quarterfinals Results, Week 2"	April 24, 2012	213A	Tuesday 9:00pm	8.93	3.4/8
18	"Semifinals: Live Performance"	April 30, 2012	214	Monday 8:00pm	9.52	3.5/9
19	"Semifinals Results"	May 1, 2012	214A	Tuesday 9:00pm	8.90	3.1/8
20	"Live Finale Performance"	May 7, 2012	215	Monday 8:00pm	10.74	3.8/10
21	"Live Finale Results"	May 8, 2012	215A	Tuesday 9:00pm	11.90	4.4/11

== Artists' appearances in other media ==
- Tony Lucca was part of The Mickey Mouse Club with Christina Aguilera.
- Adam Lasher, who failed to turn a chair in the blind auditions, later auditioned for season fourteen of American Idol. He was cut in Hollywood Week. He auditioned again the next season, and advanced to the Top 24.
- Erin Martin appeared on Rock of Love – season two, but was eliminated after the first episode.
- Jamar Rogers auditioned for American Idol – season eight, but his journey ended in the green mile round (top 36 selection).
- Jordis Unga appeared on Rockstar: INXS and finished in 5th place.
- Justin Hopkins appeared on America's Got Talent – season five, but was eliminated in the Vegas Rounds.
- Pip and Mathai both appeared on the casting special of The Glee Project (Episode 0). Pip's placing is unknown, although he was given airtime on the show. Mathai made it into the Top 20, but was not shortlisted for the Top 12.
- WADE was a contestant on American Idol – season ten, advancing to the Las Vegas rounds.
- Erin Willett appeared on seventeenth season of The Biggest Loser, but she finished in Week 11.
