= Kete =

Kete may refer to:

== Places ==
- Kete, a junior Jüz in contemporary Kazakhstan

== Other uses ==
- Kete (food) an Armenian flaky pastry
- Kete (basket), traditional Māori baskets, normally woven from flax leaves
- Kete (surname), a surname (including a list of people with the name)
- Kete language
- Akete, drums used in Asante and Nyabinghi music
- USS Kete (SS-369), a United States Navy submarine
