= Juliet Simms =

American singer-songwriter

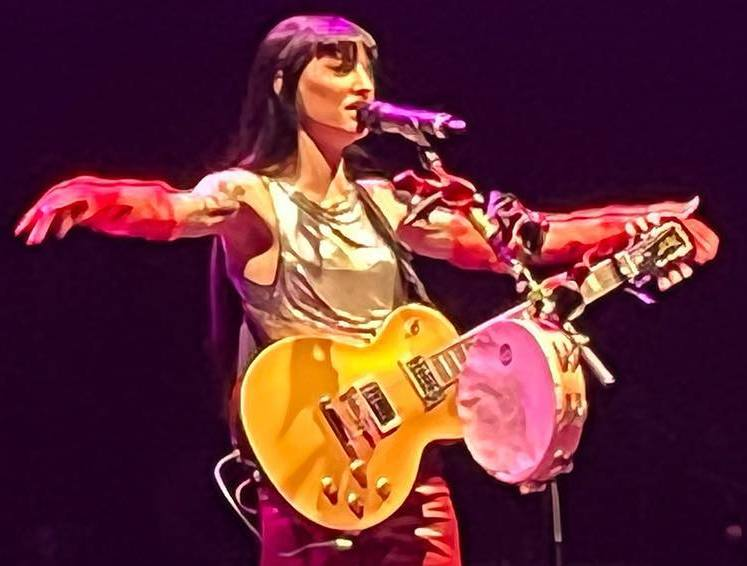
- Simms performing as Lilith Czar in 2022 in Worcester, Massachusetts

Background information
- Also known as: Lilith Czar
- Born: Juliet Nicole Simms; February 26, 1986 (age 40); San Francisco, California, U.S.
- Origin: Clearwater, Florida, U.S.
- Genres: Rock; pop; soul; folk rock; alternative rock; indie rock; punk rock
- Occupations: Singer; songwriter
- Instruments: Vocalist; Guitar; Piano
- Years active: 2000–present
- Labels: Epic, RCA, Umbrella Records, Sony, Paper + Plastick Records, Universal Republic Records, Ju Ju Productions, Sumerian Records
- Formerly of: Automatic Loveletter
- Website: https://www.lilithczarmusic.com/

Juliet Nicole Simms (born February 26, 1986), also known as Lilith Czar, is an American singer and songwriter.

She established a fan base as the front woman of the band Automatic Loveletter. In 2007 – in the band's earliest years – she became friends with Kevin Lyman. This resulted in her being a returning act on the Warped Tour summer circuit. After the summer of 2011 and working the circuit solo for the first time, Simms has since produced her own content as a solo artist.

In 2011, Simms auditioned for Season 2 of NBC's The Voice. She sang "Oh! Darling" by The Beatles for her blind audition, and chose CeeLo Green as her coach. She went on to cover songs such as "Roxanne" by The Police and "It's a Man's Man's Man's World" by James Brown. After placing second on The Voice, Simms signed with Universal Republic Records, and then ultimately left the record label due to lack of creative control.

Simms went on to become an independent solo artist, releasing 3 EPs and several singles and music videos, before signing with Sumerian Records in 2019.

On April 16, 2016, Simms married Black Veil Brides frontman Andy Biersack.

In 2021, she rebranded and now goes by the stage name of Lilith Czar. Lilith Czar released the album Created From Filth and Dust under Sumerian Records in 2021.

== Automatic Loveletter ==
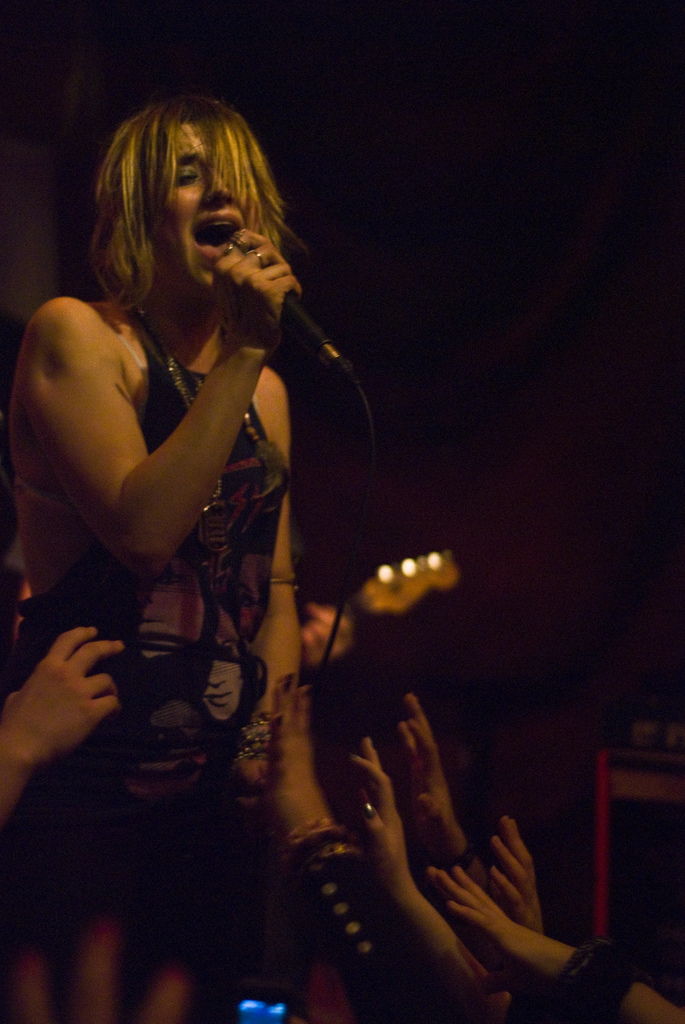
Simms performing with Automatic Loveletter in 2008

Simms was the front woman and songwriter/guitarist for the band Automatic Loveletter from 2006 to 2011, releasing four EPs and two full-length albums before their disbandment in late 2011. Automatic Loveletter released its debut album, Truth or Dare, on June 22, 2010, followed by the album The Kids Will Take Their Monsters On through an independent record label, Paper & Plastick, on June 23, 2011.

Automatic Loveletter was formed with Simms on guitar and lead vocals, Daniel Currier on drums, and brother Tommy Simms playing bass and producing, with bassist Sean Noll sitting in on occasion in Tommy's home studio in the Tampa Bay area. The band was first called Stars and Scars and recorded its first song together in December 2005, naming the song after the band but written by Simms. They also recorded "Tin Lizzy", written by Tommy Simms.

They were signed by Allison Hagendorf, the host of Fuse TV's The Pop TV Show, who was then working at Epic Records. Epic struggled with the Sony BMG 2005 Payola Scandal and internal problems, finally dropping over 70 bands in 2007. Automatic Loveletter was not dropped but was also not supported for the next year and a half touring in the drummer's Ford Excursion and burning their own copies of their Epic-produced CD with hand painted slip covers to help fund their tours.

Automatic Loveletter recorded their never-released debut EP in 2007 with producer Matt Squire. "He challenged me and I challenged him," Simms said. "I felt very comfortable and that's when the best of me comes out. The entire time was playful and fun and that's what music is about to me — having a good time." Simms took her songbook to Matt Squire and narrowed down the tunes and crafted them to fit together, sometimes taking songs in entirely new directions. "The Answer", for instance, was originally a ballad, but became one of the more upbeat numbers on the album. Currier and lead guitarist Nelson played on the album, Noll officially joining just before some of their first tours together and Tommy Simms occasionally touring with the band to play lead or rhythm guitar in larger venues and outdoor concerts. The band played both the main Bamboozle and Bamboozle Left in 2008.

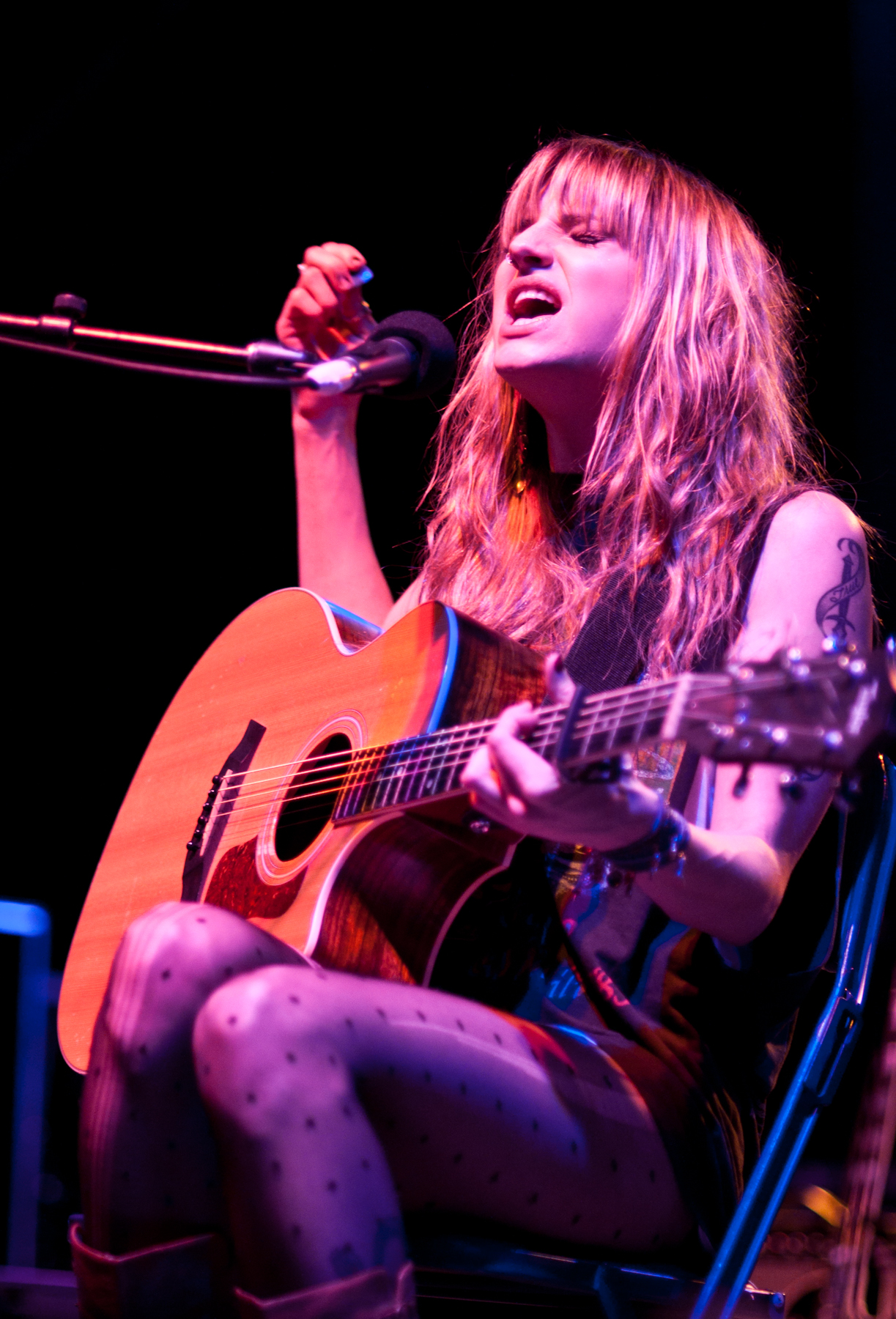
Simms performing in 2010 in San Diego, California

The tracks "The Answer", "Parker", "August 28th 3:30 A.M.", "Hush" and "Make-Up Smeared Eyes (Acoustic)" were released on their first official EP release in Recover 2007. But after the tour, when Epic was scheduled to release the album Automatic Loveletter, they were told to continue touring and asked by then President Charlie Walk to write more upbeat music.

Instead, Simms submitted a fan favorite "Black Ink Revenge" which was rejected several times for rewrite until it became "My Goodbye" one of the tracks off the upcoming Sony release. "I had been signed to Epic for going on three years, I toured in cars with my completely broke band and was feeling like I disappointed my fans who had been promised music for over a year so I sat in my room for four days re - writing and re - submitting that song like 5 times. I like "My Goodbye" a LOT but it was the result of a lot of pressure and the desire to get an album released."

"My Goodbye", "The Day that Saved Us", and "Hush (New Version)" were quickly released as another self-titled EP just before the final chapter with Epic Records when they fired all the members except Currier before the first headlining tour.

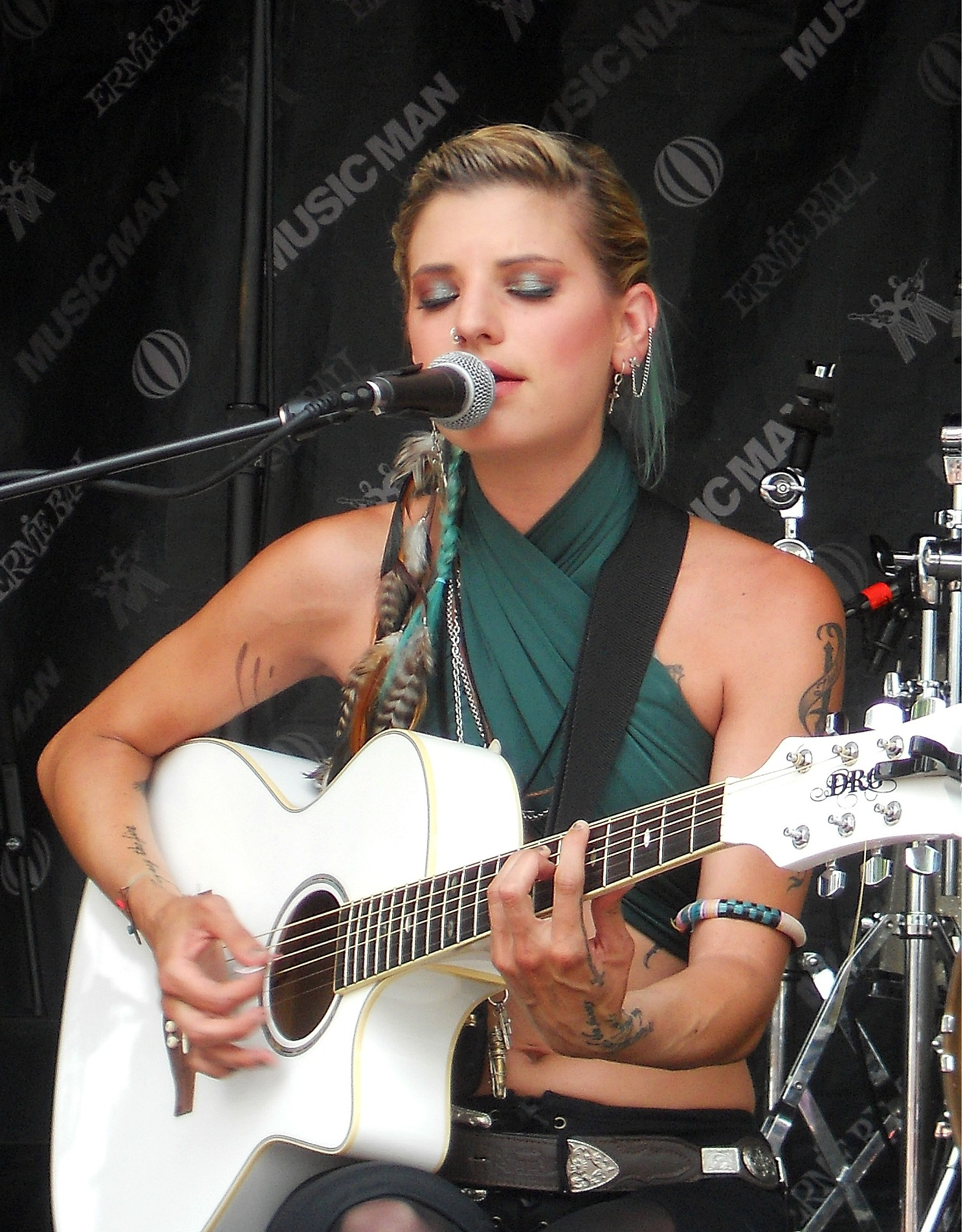
Simms performing during Warped Tour 2011

Epic held auditions for new members and hired Jacob Fatoroochi, James Bowen, and Wayne Miller. Halfway through the tour, Epic called Simms and told her that all of the pay for the band was being withdrawn and the band was dropped from the label. Despite this setback, the band pulled together and stayed on to complete the tour. Automatic Loveletter went on to sell out venues like the Knitting Factory in LA and San Francisco. "It was very liberating. After crying my eyes out for a couple hours, I had some of my best show's ever on that tour." The band was picked up by Sony and Simms was asked to write for a new album produced by Josh Abraham.

In 2011, Automatic Loveletter released an entirely acoustic album through Paper + Plastick Records called "The Kids Will Take Their Monsters On". The album was produced by Shane Henderson.

== Solo career ==
=== The Voice (2012) ===
Simms was a contestant on the 2012 season of the American television show The Voice. She sang the Beatles' "Oh! Darling" for her blind audition, and chose to be a member of Team Cee Lo.

Simms advanced to the live rounds after defeating Sarah Golden in a duet. In her first live show, she performed "Roxanne" by The Police. During the quarterfinals, Simms covered "Cryin'" by Aerosmith.

Simms was the only female contestant to advance onto the finals, edging out Jamar Rogers, after covering "It's A Man's Man's Man's World". Simms' cover of "It's A Man's Man's Man's World" reached #70 and also attained positions in three other charts on Billboard.

For the finale, Simms sang Lynyrd Skynyrd's "Free Bird." She placed second behind Jermaine Paul.

Performances on The Voice Season 2
Round in Season	Song\Artist		Result
Blind Audition	"Oh! Darling"	The Beatles	Coaches Adam, Christina, and CeeLo turned Joined Coach CeeLo
Battle Round	"Stay With Me" (vs Sarah Golden)	Faces	Saved by CeeLo Green
Live Show 2	"Roxanne"	The Police	Saved (Public Vote)
Quarter-Finals	"Cryin'"	Aerosmith	Bottom 2 (Saved by CeeLo Green)
Last Chance Performance	"Torn"	Ednaswap	Bottom 2 (Saved by CeeLo Green)
Semi-Finals	"It's a Man's Man's Man's World"	James Brown	Safe (121 Points)
Finale	"Crazy"	Gnarls Barkley	Runner-Up
Finale	"Born to Be Wild" (with CeeLo Green)	Steppenwolf	Runner-Up
Finale	"Free Bird"	Lynyrd Skynyrd	Runner-Up

Simms' "The Voice Performances" singles released by Universal Republic Records. Made available on iTunes and CD

Title	Original Artist	Release
"Roxanne"	The Police	January 1, 2012
"Oh! Darling"	The Beatles	February 5, 2012
"Stay With Me"	Faces	March 13, 2012
"Cryin'"	Aerosmith	April 23, 2012
"It's a Man's Man's Man's World"	James Brown	April 30, 2012
"Born to Be Wild"	Steppenwolf	May 7, 2012
"Free Bird"	Lynyrd Skynyrd	May 7, 2012

=== Post-The Voice (2012–2021) ===
Shortly after finishing The Voice, Simms was signed by CeeLo Green, her coach on the show. Her debut single "Wild Child" was released on December 11, 2012, followed by a music video in April 2013, for which Cee Lo Green was an executive producer. An album was scheduled for release in 2013, but ultimately was not released after she left the label. Simms completed a US tour with Secondhand Serenade and Veronica Ballestrini during March and April 2013.

Simms transitioned her branding after The Voice, and has since produced her own content as a solo artist. On January 27, 2015, Simms released her "All or Nothing" EP. The recording and development of the album was primarily funded by PledgeMusic, A music video for the EP's fourth track, "End of the World", was released May 2015. Simms heavily promoted the EP during the Vans Warped Tour of that year, where she also began dating Andy Biersack of Black Veil Brides. They married in April 2016.

Simms second solo EP, From the Grave, was crowd-funded though PledgeMusic with pledgers receiving a free download of the song 'Someday.' The EP was released July 15, 2016.

Simms was featured on the seventh installment in the Fearless Records compilation series Punk Goes Pop. She and Biersack performed a duet cover of Adele's 2015 hit song When We Were Young on July 14, 2017. A music video was also released for the cover upon the release of Punk Goes Pop Vol. 7. On April 27, 2018, she released her new single 'Take Me', which was written about the emotional hardships of two touring musicians in a committed relationship. The music video was released on May 9, 2018.

In 2019, Simms announced her signing to Sumerian Records and released single "Bad Love" to kick off the Rockstar Energy Disrupt 2019 Tour in August 2019. Following this, she released her second single with Sumerian, '100 Little Deaths' in September 2019. In 2020, Simms released a 3-song EP titled 'Descent' along with a music video for the lead song off of the EP, 'All American'.

=== Rebrand as Lilith Czar (2021–present) ===
After leaving fans in the dark on social media after her 2020 EP 'Descent', Simms posted teasers and photos, hiding her face. In February 2021, Simms announced her new name Lilith Czar, inspired by Lilith, the female equal to Adam, and a czar, meaning a ruler. She announced a new album called Created from Filth and Dust, which was released by Sumerian Records on April 23, 2021.

On February 19, 2021, she released the single 'King', featuring the lyrics “If it’s a man’s world, I want to be king.” Simms has said that the song: "came to me because of some guy in a band that was really misogynistic towards me. I felt sick of being treated badly because I have a vagina and boobs, and that’s where the lyric, ‘If it’s a man’s world, I want to be king’ comes from. Work on this song began in the middle of 2019, but it went through a huge number of rewrites over the course of the following 12 months. I scrutinised over every note and did a significant number of takes when it came to recording, and so many ended up being thrown away. It was pretty painful."

In 2022, Simms toured with The Trinity Of Terror Tour in America, also featuring Black Veil Brides, Motionless In White, and Ice Nine Kills. She also supported Taylor Momsen and The Pretty Reckless alongside The Warning. In 2023, Simms toured in the United Kingdom with Black Veil Brides and Cemetery Sun.

In 2025, Simms featured on track 'Hearse for Two' by The Funeral Portrait.

== Personal life ==
On October 31, 2016, Simms was detained by the FBI off of an airplane for allegedly hitting her husband Andy Biersack while under the influence on a flight to Los Angeles. According to the video testimony given by a witness to the incident, Simms forcibly struck Biersack in the face twice and struck herself in the face with the airline handcuffs until her nose began to bleed. Following the incident, both released statements about the effects of alcohol and confirming that they did not separate.

Both of Simms' parents are members of the Church of Scientology and the family moved to Clearwater, Florida, which is the "worldwide spiritual headquarters" of Scientology, when Simms was eight years old, but Simms has not spoken about her adult involvement with the Church. Her father, Jeffrey Simms, claimed that "I'm sure she's known as a Scientologist by many in the Church... But [the support] isn't an organized thing. She probably has more fans from the Vans Warped Tour."

== Discography ==
Albums, Extended Plays, and Singles
Moniker	Title	Release type	Release		Label (at the time)
Automatic Loveletter	Recover	EP	November 6, 2007	Re-released by Hot Topic label with two bonus tracks, 2008*	Epic\Sony BMG Music Entertainment
Automatic Loveletter	The Ghosts We Carry Home	Intended for release; unreleased	2007\2008	*Unfinished\unreleased	Epic\Sony Music Entertainment
Automatic Loveletter	Automatic Loveletter	EP	February 3, 2009	*Previously unavailable due to licensing issues with then label Sony.	Epic\Sony Music Entertainment
Automatic Loveletter	"Heart Song"	Single	April, 2010		Epic\Sony Music Japan International, Inc.
Automatic Loveletter	Truth or Dare	Album	June 22, 2010 Limited-Run U.S Release	2011 Worldwide Release	Epic\Sony Music Japan International, Inc.
Automatic Loveletter	The Kids Will Take Their Monsters On	Album	June 28, 2011		Paper + Plastick Records
Juliet Simms	Wild Child	Single	December 11, 2012		Universal Republic Records
Juliet Simms	All or Nothing	EP	January 27, 2015		Ju Ju Productions, Inc.
Juliet Simms	From the Grave	Album	July 15, 2016		Ju Ju Productions
Juliet Simms	"Take Me"	Single	April 27, 2018		Ju Ju Productions, Inc.
Juliet Simms	Bad Love	Single	June 21, 2019		Sumerian Records
Juliet Simms	100 Little Deaths	Single	August 23, 2019		Sumerian Records
Juliet Simms	All American	Single	6 November 2020		Sumerian Records
Lilith Czar	Created From Filth and Dust	Album	April 23, 2021	First album released under the name Lilith Czar	Sumerian Records

Feature Artist Work
Band	Album	Song	Release
LoveHateHero	Just Breathe	"Theatre of Robots"	2005
Cartel	Cartel	"Lose It"	2007
All Time Low	So Wrong, It's Right	"Remembering Sunday"	2007
Secondhand Serenade	A Twist in My Story	"Fix You"	2009
Secondhand Serenade	Hear Me Now	Hear Me Now	2010
Win Win Winter	Then The Archers Bowed And Broke Their Bows	"Here In The Horse's Heart"	2011
Black Veil Brides	Wretched and Divine: The Story of the Wild Ones	"Lost It All"	2013
Simple Plan	Taking One For The Team	"I Dream About You"	2016
Andy Black	The Shadow Side	"Homecoming King", "Ribcage", "Drown Me Out", "The Void"	2016
The Funeral Portrait	Greetings From Suffocate City	"Hearse For Two"	2025
Black Veil Brides	Vindicate	"Cut"	2026

Recorded Covers
Title	Original Artist	Cover By	Notes\Release	Recording Year\Date
"Voices Carry"	'Til Tuesday	Automatic Loveletter	Was exclusively available for download on PledgeMusic 2014.*	2007 (estimated)
"Careless Whisper"	Wham!	3OH!3 Featured w. Alex Gaskarth	Was available for online downloading at some point in 2008.*	2008 (estimated)
"Take Me Home Tonight"	Eddie Money	Feature Artist for Every Avenue	Punk Goes Classic Rock	April 27, 2010
"Gimme Shelter"	The Rolling Stones	Juliet Simms	Was exclusively available for download on PledgeMusic 2014.*	July, 2014 (estimated)
"When We Were Young"	Adele	Feature Artist for Andy Black	Single via Fearless Records	2017

== Music videos ==
Music video filmography
Year	Video	Director
2006	"Hush"	Luke Watson
2008	"Make-Up Smeared Eyes"	Northern Five
2010	"Heart Song"	Chad Feehan
2010	"Story Of My Life"	Ehashin
2013	"Wild Child"	Tabitha Denholm
2015	"End Of The World"	Joshua Shultz
2017	"Trouble Finds You"	Patrick Fogarty
2017	"Say Hello"	Joshua Shultz
2018	"Take Me"	Joshua Shultz
2019	“Bad Love”	Patrick Fogarty
2019	”100 Little Deaths”	Patrick Fogarty
2020	"All American"	Patrick Fogarty
2021	"King"	Patrick Fogarty
2021	”Lola”	Patrick Fogarty
2021	"Anarchy"	Patrick Fogarty

== Charts ==
Year	Song	Peak chart positions		Album	Certifications
Year	Song	US	US Main.	Album	Certifications
as Juliet Simms
2012	"Roxanne"	86	—	Non-album single	US: 45,000
2012	"It's a Man's Man's Man's World"	70	—	Non-album single	US: 67,000
2012	"Free Bird"	101	—	Non-album single	US: 40,000
as Lilith Czar
2021	"Anarchy"	—	23	Created from Filth and Dust	
2022	"100 Little Deaths"	—	37	Created from Filth and Dust	
as featured artist
2026	"Cut" (Black Veil Brides feat. Lilith Czar)	—	28	Vindicate	
"—" denotes a release that did not chart.
