= Kete (surname) =

Kete is a surname. Notable people with the surname include:

- Emma Kete (born 1987), New Zealand footballer
- Molefi Kete Asante (born 1942), American academic, historian and philosopher
- Naia Kete (born 1990), American reggae singer and contestant on the second season of "The Voice"
