= Moses Stone =

American singer-songwriter, rapper, record producer, and entrepreneur (born 1986)

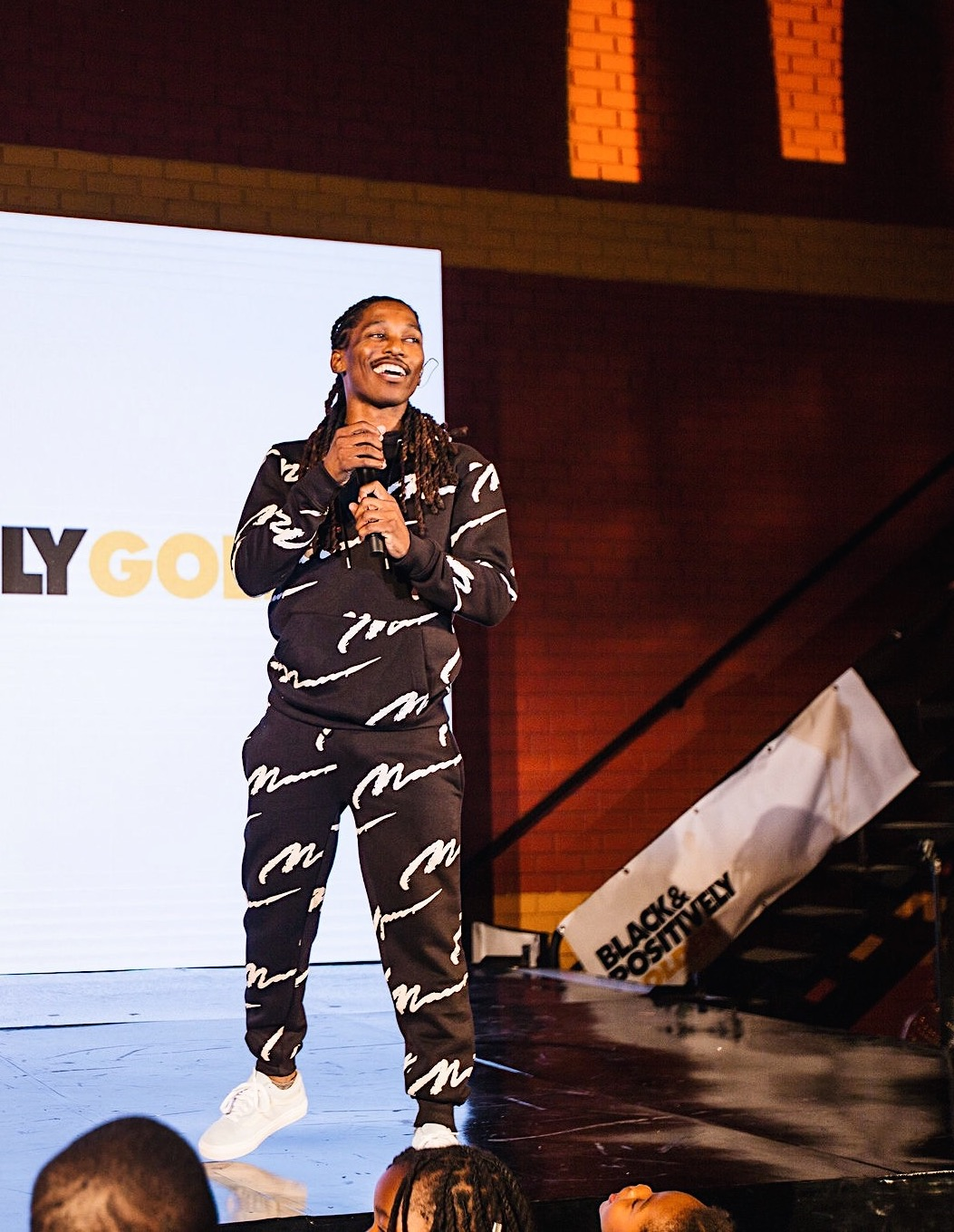
- Stone at McDonald's – Black & Positively Golden Day (2019)

Background information
- Born: Moses Kenneth Haughton Jr. October 19, 1986 (age 39); Washington, D.C., U.S.
- Origin: Washington, D.C. / Laurel, Maryland
- Genres: Hip hop; R&B; Pop; Reggae
- Occupations: Singer; songwriter; rapper; record producer; DJ; entrepreneur; actor; author
- Instruments: Vocals, piano, guitar
- Years active: 2004–present
- Label: ARTSKY
- Website: www.mosesstone.io

Moses Kenneth Haughton Jr. (born October 19, 1986), known professionally as Moses Stone, is an American singer-songwriter, rapper, Billboard-charting record producer, DJ, entrepreneur, actor, and author. Born in Washington, D.C. and raised in Prince George's County, Maryland, Stone is of Jamaican-American heritage — his mother, Renita R. Lattimore, is American, and his father, Moses Haughton Sr., is from Kingston, Jamaica.

He is the founder of Haughton Ventures Inc., a private equity venture firm; Ventured Brands, a brand acquisition, development, marketing, and licensing company; and ARTSKY, a full-service media, entertainment, and content creation company.

Stone is known as the songwriter, vocalist, and official ambassador of McDonald's Black & Positively Golden campaign, for which he wrote and performed the anthem "We Golden." The campaign received a 2019 Clio Awards Shortlist recognition in the Film Technique: Music Original category. He is a Billboard-charting record producer, holding a production credit on Decade of a Love King (2018) by three-time Grammy-nominated R&B artist Raheem DeVaughn, released via BMG Rights Management. In 2012, he became the first rapper and singer to compete on NBC's The Voice, where he was a member of Christina Aguilera's team.

== Early life ==
Stone was born on October 19, 1986, in Washington, D.C., and raised in Prince George's County, Maryland — specifically in the communities of Landover and Laurel. He is of Jamaican-American heritage; his mother, Renita R. Lattimore, is American, and his father, Moses Haughton Sr., is from Kingston, Jamaica. Stone has traced his love of music back to age six, when he was first introduced to rap by an older cousin. By his early teens he was already performing across the DMV region, at venues including Bar Nun in Washington, D.C., Howard University, and talent shows and festivals throughout the Maryland, Virginia, and D.C. area.

Stone graduated from Laurel High School in 2004 and subsequently relocated to Hollywood, California, where he enrolled at the Musicians Institute in the Independent Artist Program, studying hip hop, pop, jazz, funk, electronica, reggae, and related genres. While at MI, he co-founded an indie hip-hop band called Every Thursday with a fellow student, and landed an internship at Universal Music Group Distribution, advancing to a project manager role overseeing work across Universal Records, Universal Music Gospel, Machete Music, Universal Music Latin, and Fontana Distribution.

== Musical career ==
=== Early recognition ===
As a child and teenage performer known as "Young Moses," Stone competed in televised talent competitions and built an early reputation across the DMV. He appeared on MTV's Say What? Karaoke and BET's 106 & Park Wild Out Wednesday, winning audience competitions on both programs. His stage presence also earned him a spot at Showtime at the Apollo in Harlem, New York, where he placed third and was the only rapper to win an Amateur Night competition there in 2004. He also opened for LeToya Luckett — a former member of the Grammy Award-winning group Destiny's Child — at Hunter College in New York City.

Stone affiliated with Eruption Music Group (EMG), a full-service independent label and management operation. He was featured on "Angel," a power ballad available on iTunes and major digital retailers, and was named a featured solo artist by the company. The association earned Stone a feature in Billboard — the music industry's most prominent trade publication — in a piece spotlighting the label and its affiliated artists.

=== 2012: NBC's The Voice ===
In 2012, Stone auditioned for the Emmy Award-nominated second season of NBC's The Voice, becoming the first rapper and singer hybrid in the show's history. During the blind auditions, his hybrid style as an MC and vocalist successfully turned multiple coaches' chairs, ultimately leading him to choose Christina Aguilera's Team Xtina. The panel that season included Aguilera, Adam Levine of Maroon 5, country star Blake Shelton, and Cee Lo Green.

Stone advanced through the battle rounds and into the first live shows, where he delivered a high-energy mashup of Kanye West's "Stronger" and "Power" alongside background dancers. He was also mentored during the competition by music icon Lionel Richie. Following his run on the show, Stone appeared on The Tonight Show with Jay Leno as a representative of Team Christina.

Following the show, Stone released his debut single "My Moment" and performed it live at a SKYY Vodka event at Coachella in 2012. He also performed at the Viper Room on the Sunset Strip in West Hollywood, California, and delivered a live nationally broadcast performance at the Home Depot Center in Carson, California, for the Showtime Championship Boxing main event — the Lateef Kayode vs. Antonio Tarver fight — before an arena crowd of 18,800 attendees. He subsequently released the mixtape Resilient (2012) and its follow-up Resilient 2 (2014).

=== Music placements and production credits ===
As a songwriter and producer, Stone secured music placements across a wide range of major television networks and programming, including Keeping Up with the Kardashians, Bad Girls Club, My Super Sweet 16, The Daily Show, Saturday Night Live, Access Hollywood, E! News, WWE, NFL programming, NBA programming, NBC, NCAA sports, Netflix, Hulu, MTV, VH1, and Oxygen. Through his production company Art Sky Productions, Stone also created music and sound branding for the NFL, NBA, Oprah, The PGA Tour, and APM Music.

In February 2016, Stone produced "Come Together" for three-time Grammy-nominated Washington, D.C.-area R&B recording artist Raheem DeVaughn. The track was covered across multiple independent music publications. SoulBounce described Stone's production as turning "what would otherwise be a traditional R&B banger into a fully modern fusion of R&B and trap." The production credit was subsequently included on DeVaughn's sixth studio album Decade of a Love King (2018), released via BMG Rights Management, which debuted at number 22 on the Billboard Independent Albums chart and number 95 on the Billboard Top Current Albums chart, making Stone a Billboard-charting record producer.

In 2016, Stone guest starred on the Nickelodeon series Game Shakers, portraying the character Hatchit in the Season 2 episode "Babe's Bench."

=== 2015–2016: McDonald's Summer & Lovin' and All-Day Breakfast campaigns ===
Stone first partnered with McDonald's in 2015 as the ambassador for their "Summer & Lovin'" campaign, producing and performing the music for the commercial. The spot premiered during the NBA Finals, drawing an audience of over 20.4 million viewers. McDonald's subsequently extended his involvement through their All-day breakfast campaign in 2015 and 2016.

=== 2019: McDonald's Black & Positively Golden and Clio Award recognition ===
In 2019, Stone became the songwriter, vocalist, and official ambassador of McDonald's Black & Positively Golden campaign, the brand's largest African American-focused initiative in 16 years, replacing the 365Black platform McDonald's had used since 2003. Stone wrote and performed the campaign anthem "We Golden," which debuted nationally on March 30, 2019, during the 50th NAACP Image Awards on TV One. On March 29, 2019, Stone performed the anthem at the campaign's official launch event at the YWCA in Leimert Park, Los Angeles, alongside recording artist Normani and actress Yvonne Orji.

"We Golden" was reported as the number one rated commercial among African American audiences in over 16 years. The campaign received a 2019 Clio Awards Shortlist recognition in the Film Technique: Music Original category, entered by Burrell Communications Group on behalf of McDonald's.

=== 2019: International collaborations and streaming milestones ===
Also in 2019, Stone expanded his global footprint through international collaborations. His feature on "Only One" by Saint Clue and Rubika amassed over one million streams online. The follow-up collaboration "Come Alive" — featuring Stone alongside Swedish singer Linn Sandin — surpassed 2.5 million streams and received international broadcast recognition, premiering live on BBC Radio and serving as an official soundtrack at ESL One York 2019, one of the year's most prominent global esports events. The track was released on September 20, 2019, through Intercord, and is available across all major streaming platforms.

=== Entrepreneurship and authorship ===
Stone is the founder of several companies operating across entertainment, media, private equity, and brand development, including Haughton Ventures Inc., Ventured Brands, and ARTSKY — encompassing Art Sky Entertainment (record label), Art Sky Productions (music production and licensing), and Art Sky Agency (creative digital agency). In 2020, he published Stumbling Into Entrepreneurship: Lessons For Success. The Mindset Needed to Become Your Own Boss (ISBN 979-8631341203).

== Musical style ==
Stone's music incorporates elements of hip hop, pop, R&B, and reggae, blending rapping and singing in a hybrid style that he pioneered on national television. His work as a songwriter and producer spans commercial music, sync licensing, record production, and sound branding across television, film, and live entertainment.

== Discography ==
=== Albums ===
Year	Title	Notes
2004	Young Moses	Debut independent release
2006	Chapter 2: Through the Eyes of a Minor	Independent release
2015	Warrior	Independent album release
2017	Soon You'll Understand	Five-track EP

=== Mixtapes ===
Year	Title	Notes
2010	The Audition	Eight-track hip hop / rap project
2012	Resilient	Debut mixtape; released following The Voice Season 2
2014	Resilient 2	Follow-up mixtape

=== Selected singles ===
Year	Title	Notes
2012	"My Moment"	Debut post-Voice single; performed live at SKYY Vodka Coachella event (2012)
2016	"Young & Invincible" feat. Lisa Scinta	Featured on Young Hollywood
2017	"You Got It" feat. Gabby Moe	Independent single
2017	"Big City"	Independent single
2017	"Gone" feat. Shwayze & Hero DeLano	Beach/reggae-influenced single; video filmed in Malibu
2019	"Still"	Independent single
2019	"We Golden"	McDonald's Black & Positively Golden anthem; McDonald's largest African American-focused campaign in 16 years; 2019 Clio Awards Shortlist
2019	"Come Alive" feat. Linn Sandin	With Saint Clue & Rubika; 2.5M+ streams; BBC Radio premiere; ESL One York 2019 official soundtrack; released via Intercord
2019	"Only One" feat. Moses Stone	With Saint Clue & Rubika; 1M+ streams

=== Production credits ===
Year	Artist	Track / Project	Notes
2016	Raheem DeVaughn	"Come Together"	Three-time Grammy-nominated artist; praised by SoulBounce, The Boombox, and YouKnowIGotSoul
2018	Raheem DeVaughn	Decade of a Love King (Track 10 — Art Sky Productions)	Billboard-charting album; peaked at #22 Billboard Independent Albums and #95 Billboard Top Current Albums; released via BMG Rights Management
2019	McDonald's / Moses Stone	"We Golden"	Campaign anthem; 2019 Clio Awards Shortlist
2015–2016	McDonald's	"Summer & Lovin'", All-Day Breakfast spots	Multi-year national campaign music production
Various	NFL, NBA, Oprah, PGA Tour, APM Music	Various sync placements	Through Art Sky Productions

== Filmography ==
=== Television ===
Year	Title	Role	Notes
2008	Who Are You Wearin'?	Himself	Early credited appearance
2012	The Voice (Season 2)	Himself	First rapper and singer in show history; Team Christina Aguilera
2012	The Tonight Show with Jay Leno	Himself	Team Christina guest appearance
2012	Showtime Championship Boxing (Kayode vs. Tarver)	Himself	Live national performance; Home Depot Center, Carson, CA; 18,800 attendees
2016	Game Shakers (Season 2, "Babe's Bench")	Hatchit	Guest role; Nickelodeon

=== Commercials ===
Year	Title	Role	Notes
2010	Monsters.com	College Student	Main Role
2013	Domino's Pizza	Studio Engineer	Main Role
2015	McDonald's — "Summer & Lovin'"	Performer / Ambassador / Producer	Premiered during NBA Finals; 20.4M viewers
2015–2016	McDonald's — All-Day Breakfast	Performer / Ambassador / Producer	National multi-spot campaign
2019	McDonald's — Black & Positively Golden	Songwriter / Vocalist / Ambassador	Clio Awards Shortlist; McDonald's largest African American-focused campaign in 16 years; premiered at 50th NAACP Image Awards

== Books ==
- Stumbling Into Entrepreneurship: Lessons For Success. The Mindset Needed to Become Your Own Boss (2020). ISBN 979-8631341203

== Awards and recognition ==
Year	Award	Category	Result
2019	Clio Awards	Film Technique: Music Original — McDonald's "Black & Positively Golden"	Shortlist Recipient
2019	Billboard Charts	Producer credit — Decade of a Love King, Raheem DeVaughn (BMG Rights Management); peaked #22 Billboard Independent Albums, #95 Billboard Top Current Albums	Billboard-charting producer
2019	50th NAACP Image Awards	Campaign national broadcast premiere — "We Golden"	Featured
2019	McDonald's Corporate Newsroom	Largest African American-focused campaign in 16 years	Official songwriter, vocalist, and ambassador
2013	Billboard	Spotlight feature — Eruption Music Group	Featured artist
2012	NBC's The Voice (Season 2)	First rapper and singer in show history — Team Christina Aguilera	Historic first
2007	BET's 106 & Park Wild Out Wednesday	Audience competition	First place
2004	MTV's Say What? Karaoke	Audience competition	First place
2004	Showtime at the Apollo	Live performance — Amateur Night	Placed third; only rapper to win Amateur Night
