= Sarah Golden =

American singer

Sarah Golden (born October 24, 1983) is an independent American Folk Singer/Songwriter from Houston, Texas. She was a contestant on the second season of the American reality talent show The Voice, in 2012.

== Personal life ==
Sarah Golden is the youngest of three. Her mother was a vocal major, choir director and sang with the Houston Symphony Corral. Her brother, Willy T Golden is a multi-instrumentalist who plays lap steel and pedal steel for a variety of Texas bands, including Charlie and the Regrets, Tremoloco, Broken Spokes, Paige Lewis, and Sean Reefer and the Resin Valley Boys

== The Voice (2012) ==
Sarah Golden was a contestant on the second season of NBC's reality television show, The Voice, which aired in 2012. She sang Lady Gaga's "You and I" for her blind audition and received chair turns from American country music singer, Blake Shelton, and Goodie Mob and Gnarles Barkley member, CeeLo Green. She chose CeeLo as her coach. Golden finished in the top 30 vocalists after the battle rounds, where she was paired against the season's runner-up, Juliet Simms. The two battled it out in a duet of Rod Stewart's, "Stay With Me", and CeeLo chose Juliet as the winner.

Episode	Song	Original Artist	Result
3	"You and I"	Lady Gaga	CeeLo Green and Blake Shelton turned; Golden chose CeeLo Green
7	"Stay With Me" (vs. Juliet Simms)	Rod Stewart	Eliminated

== Achievements ==
Year	Association	Category	Result
2026	Kerrville Folk Festival	Grassy Hill New Folk Competition	Won
2026	InterContinental Music Awards	Best of North America - Folk Live Wire	Won
2026	Southeast Regional Folk Alliance (SERFA)	Official Showcase Artist	Selected
2025	Southwest Regional Folk Alliance (SWRFA)	Official Showcase Artist	Selected
2025	Folk Alliance International	Scholarship	Recipient
2025	Howlin' Dog Music Group	Grant	Recipient
2025	InterContinental Music Awards	Best of North America - Folk Who is Gonna Rebuild LA	Won
2025	Corpus Christi Songwriters Festival	Most Impactful Song Who is Gonna Rebuild LA	Won
2025	OutSmart Magazine's Gayest & Greatest 2025 Reader's Choice Awards	Favorite Local Musician	Finalist
2025	OutSmart Magazine's Gayest & Greatest 2025 Reader's Choice Awards	Favorite Female Entertainer	Finalist
2014	RightOutTV Music & Video Awards	Best Folk/Roots/Country Song The One I Love	Won
2014	RightOutTV Music & Video Awards	Song of the Year The One I Love	Nominated
2014	RightOutTV Music & Video Awards	Best Song with a Social Message The One I Love	Nominated
2013	RightOutTV Music & Video Awards	Adult Contemporary Song of the Year Who Gives a Damn	Won
2013	AbOUT Magazine's F.A.C.E. Awards	Female Vocalist of the Year	Nominated
2012	Houston Press Music Awards	Best Folk Artist	Nominated
2012	AbOUT Magazine's F.A.C.E. Awards	Best Female LGBT Artist	Nominated
2002	Kerrville Folk Festival	Ballad Tree Performer	Selected

Prior to her appearance on The Voice, Sarah finished in the top 100 contestants on the American reality television series on the NBC television network, America's Got Talent in 2009, where she advanced to the Las Vegas round before being eliminated.

== Discography ==
- Live Wire (2026)
- The One I Love single (2013)
- Sessions EP (2012)
- Truth (2002)

In the Fall of 2012, Sarah released her EP, Sessions, which serves as a precursor to her sophomore album, Live Wire, recorded and produced by Edgewater Music Group in Sugar Land, TX.
