= Naia Kete =

American singer-songwriter and musician

- Born: December 22, 1989 (age 36); Northampton, Massachusetts, United States
- Origin: Northampton, Massachusetts, United States
- Genres: Pop, reggae, neo soul
- Occupation: Singer-songwriter
- Instruments: Vocals, guitar
- Years active: 2010–present
- Website: naiakete.com

Naia Kete (born December 22, 1989) is an American singer-songwriter and musician whose music spans numerous influences ranging from pop, reggae and soul. Naia was born in Northampton, Massachusetts and currently lives in Southern California where she built a street following singing at the Third Street Promenade in Santa Monica. She currently fronts her pop reggae group SayReal on bass and lead vocals, alongside her brother Imani Elijah on keys and Lee John on drums.

In early 2012, she was a contestant on the second season of the NBC television show, The Voice as a member of Team Blake making it into the Top 24. Responding to her performance on the show, Naia earned accolades from the press with Rolling Stone's review of her as "an earthy soulstress...[who has] a dynamic sound, and her smile is magic." In March 2012 Entertainment Weekly picked Naia Kete as one of their Top 10 to win The Voice.

SayReal's latest independent EP Heavy on the Down features a latest single written by Naia "All My Sisters" both streaming everywhere and on iTunes.

In April 2012 Naia Kete attended the premier and walked the red carpet at the premiere of the film Marley.
