= Katrina Parker =

American singer

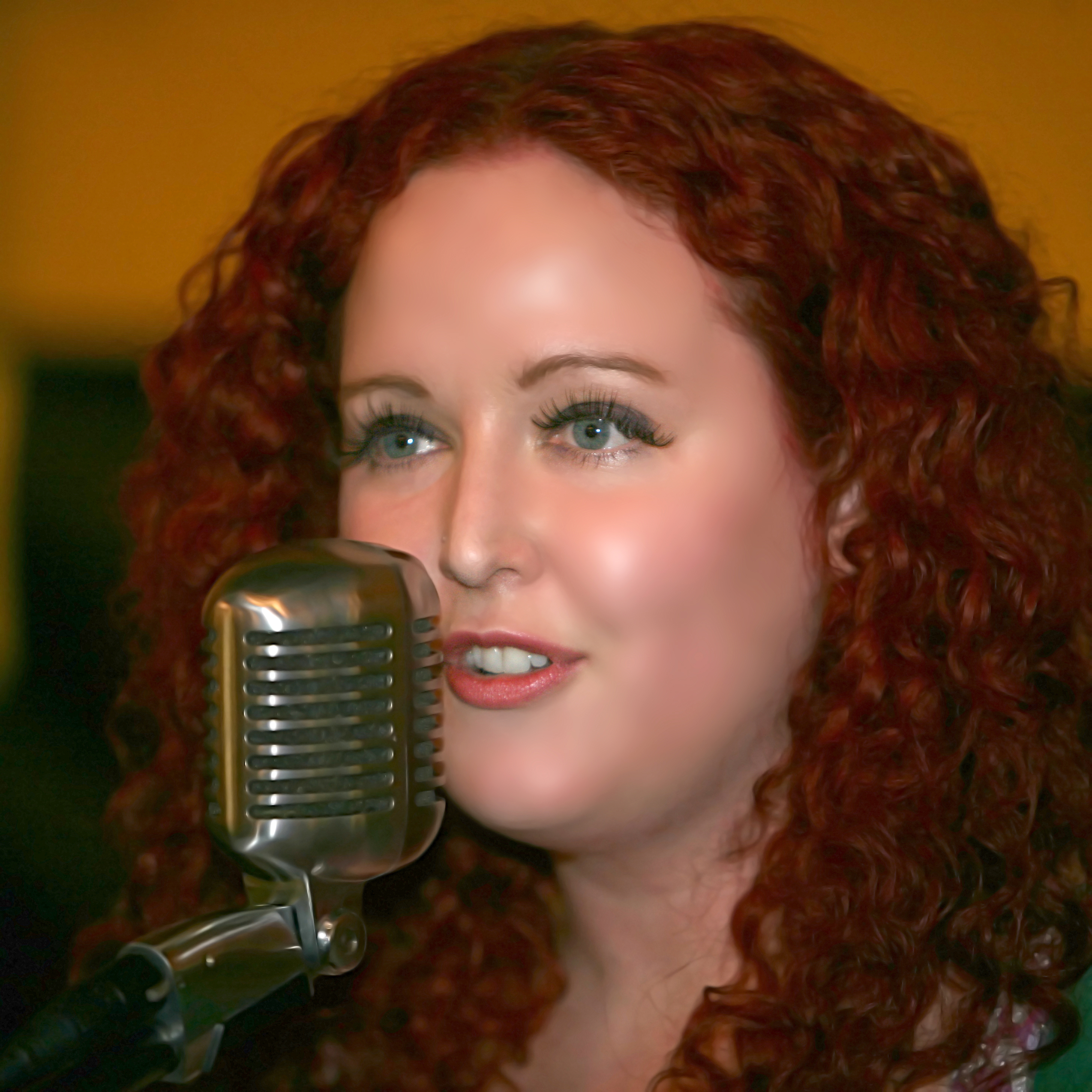
- Katrina Parker at San Diego Indie Music Fest 2008

Background information
- Born: Holly Ridge, North Carolina, U.S.
- Origin: Holly Ridge, North Carolina, U.S.
- Genres: Alternative, soul, pop
- Occupation: Musician
- Instruments: Piano, vocals
- Years active: 2005–present
- Website: http://www.katrinaparker.com/

Katrina Parker (born November 28, 1977) is an American singer based in Hollywood, Los Angeles.

== The Voice ==
Parker was a contestant in the second season of The Voice, and came in at second place on Adam Levine's team. She would have reached the show finals based on viewer's votes, but Levine chose to give 60 points to Tony Lucca and 40 points to Parker, which gave Lucca 16 more total points.

| Episode | Round | Song | Original artist | Result |
|---|---|---|---|---|
| 3 | Blind Auditions | "One of Us" | Joan Osborne | Safe |
| 8 | Battle Rounds | "Bleeding Love" (vs. Angel Taylor) | Leona Lewis | Safe |
| 12 | Live Performances | "Tonight, Tonight" | The Smashing Pumpkins | Bottom 3 |
| 13 | Last Chance Performances | "Don't Speak" | No Doubt | Saved |
| 16 | Quarter-finals | "Jar of Hearts" | Christina Perri | Bottom 2 |
| 17 | Last Chance Performances | "Perfect" | P!nk | Saved |
| 18 | Semi-finals | "Killing Me Softly With His Song" | Roberta Flack | Eliminated |

== Post-The Voice ==
Parker funded her debut album In & Out of the Dark through Kickstarter, reaching the funding goal on February 16, 2013. The album's lead single of the same name was released on August 13, 2013, followed by the album's release on September 10, 2013. Parker is releasing her second album, "Stars", on September 6, 2019. Leading up to the release she released four singles: the title track, "Stars" on July 9, 2019, the only cover on the album, "Ring of Fire" on July 23, 2019, "Follow Me" on August 6, 2019, and "Don't Give It Up" on August 20, 2019, which premiered on Billboard.com.

== Discography ==
- Only Dreaming (2005)
- In and Out of the Dark (2013)
- Stars (2019)

=== Singles ===
| Year | Single | Peak positions | Album |
| Year | Single | US | Album |
|---|---|---|---|
| 2012 | "One of Us" | – | Non-album releases by The Voice |
| 2012 | "Bleeding Love" | – | Non-album releases by The Voice |
| 2012 | "Tonight, Tonight" | – | Non-album releases by The Voice |
| 2012 | "Jar of Hearts" | – | Non-album releases by The Voice |
| 2012 | "Killing Me Softly with His Song" | 125 | Non-album releases by The Voice |
| 2013 | "In & Out of the Dark" | – | In and Out of the Dark |
| 2019 | "Stars" | – | Stars |
| 2019 | "Ring of Fire" | – | Stars |
| 2019 | "Follow Me" | – | Stars |
| 2019 | "Don't Give It Up" | – | Stars |
