= Cheesa =

American musician (born 1990)

- Also known as: Cheesa
- Born: Cheesa Laureta; August 4, 1990 (age 36); Oahu, Hawaii, U.S.
- Genres: R&B, pop, dance
- Occupations: Singer, songwriter
- Years active: 2011–present

Cheesa Laureta (born August 4, 1990), known by the mononym Cheesa, is a Filipina-American pop/R&B singer and songwriter most noted for her run on NBC's The Voice in 2012. After being chosen by Cee Lo Green, mentored by Babyface, and making it to the quarter-finals, Laureta was eliminated from The Voice in April 2012. Since The Voice, Laureta focused on developing her solo career, releasing the single "I'm Not Perfect" (featuring Charice) and her debut album, Naked.

== Early life ==
Cheesa Laureta was born on August 4, 1990, in Oahu, Hawaii, to Filipino parents Martiniana and Joseph. She lived in Ewa Beach and Kalihi and attended the all-girl Catholic St. Francis School in Manoa. At age 16, Cheesa and her family moved to Los Angeles to pursue her dream of being a singer. Cheesa graduated from Hollywood High School in 2008, and auditioned for The Voice in 2011. Her brother is musical-director Troy Laureta, who has worked with singers Ariana Grande and Jake Zyrus.

== The Voice ==
Cheesa auditioned for The Voice in 2011, when she was 21. The episode featuring her blind audition was aired February 27, 2012. Her rendition of Beyoncé's "If I Were a Boy" earned her a spot on Cee Lo Green's team. While preparing for the Battle Rounds, Cheesa worked closely with Babyface, one of her biggest influences. The March 5, 2012 broadcast of The Voice saw Cheesa beat teammate and competitor Angie Johnson in the Battle Round singing Bonnie Tyler's "Total Eclipse of the Heart". In the Live Round on April 9, 2012, Cheesa's version of Harold Melvin & the Blue Notes's "Don't Leave Me This Way" placed her in Cee Lo's Bottom Three, but her Last Chance Performance on April 10, 2012 of "All by Myself" convinced Cee Lo to keep her in the running. Cheesa's career on The Voice came to a close in the live quarter-finals and elimination rounds held on April 23 and 24, 2012. She ended up in Cee Lo Green's Bottom Two after singing "I Have Nothing" by Whitney Houston. In her Last Chance Performance, she sang Kelly Clarkson's "Already Gone", but Cee Lo ultimately had to eliminate her.

Show	Song	Original Artist	Order	Result
Blind Audition	"If I Were a Boy"	Beyoncé	4	Cee Lo Green turned; Cheesa joined his team
Battle Round	"Total Eclipse of the Heart"	Bonnie Tyler	4	Winner of Battle Round
Live Rounds 1	"Don't Leave Me This Way"	Harold Melvin & the Blue Notes	2	Saved by Cee Lo
Quarter-Finals	"I Have Nothing"	Whitney Houston	6	Eliminated

== Solo career ==
The Voice provided Cheesa her first experience performing as a solo artist, and since the season's end she has continued to develop her solo career. In a collaboration with fellow Filipino vocalist Charice, Cheesa released the single "I'm Not Perfect" on September 6, 2012. The soulful ballad advocating self-acceptance reached number one in Asia and number 12 on the US Pop iTunes Chart. Following the success of her single, Cheesa released her debut studio album Naked on April 30, 2013. Included on the album are "I'm Not Perfect" and a dubstep rendition of Britney Spears' "Toxic".

== Management ==
Cheesa is a member of, and managed by, the Assembly Entertainment, a Los Angeles-based music production and artist management company that has worked with the likes of Charice, Jordan Pruitt, Melanie Fiona, David Foster, and Darkchild.

== Discography ==
- "Bakit Pa" - Kaibigan: A Troy Laureta OPM Collective, Vol. 1 (2020), Star Music
- "Kaba" - Giliw: A Troy Laureta OPM Collective, Vol. 2 (2021), Star Music
- "Missing You" - Dalamhati: A Troy Laureta OPM Collective, Vol. 2 (2023), Star Music
