= Mathai (singer) =

American singer-songwriter

- Born: Sharon Mathai; November 27, 1992 (age 33); Queens, New York, U.S.
- Origin: Dallas, Texas, U.S.
- Genres: Pop, jazz
- Occupation: Singer-songwriter
- Instrument: Vocals
- Years active: 2012–present

Sharon Mathai, known professionally as Mathai, is an American former singer. She was on the second season of NBC's The Voice and was one of the top 10 contestants.

Trained in jazz during her childhood, Mathai started developing her vocal style around the age of sixteen with a sound reminiscent of Billie Holiday, Norah Jones, Nelly Furtado, and Adele, although two of her biggest influences are Johnny Cash and Amy Winehouse.

== Early life ==
Sharon Mathai was born on November 27, 1992, in Queens, New York into a Malayali family. Her parents, Samuel and Elsa, are from Kerala, India. She stated that she could understand Malayalam but could not speak very fluently. She adopted the stage name Mathai, which is the name 'Matthew' in Malayalam, as derived from Hebrew. She had started singing at age 3, primarily in church events. When she was 10, her family moved to Dallas, Texas. Mathai attended Coppell High School and Texas Women's University.

== Career ==
=== Beginnings ===
During the winter of 2010, Mathai had the opportunity to perform during the AMTC convention in Orlando, Florida where she was discovered by two entertainment executives, and soon took a break from school to move to Atlanta to pursue her music career.

In late 2010 she auditioned for The Glee Project, a spin-off of the television series GLEE on FOX. After advancing to the final round, she did not make the cast, but she was convinced that singing was what she wanted to do.

In November 2011, on a dare from friends, Mathai auditioned for Season 2 of the talent competition series, The Voice on NBC. After making it through the blind auditions, her rendition of "Rumor Has It" by Adele's caused coaches (Adam Levine, Blake Shelton, and Cee-Lo Green) to turn around and woo her to join their team. Mathai joined Team Adam and over the next several weeks continued to advance before being eliminated after making the top ten.

=== After The Voice ===
Mathai collaborated with Lecrae on the track "Free From it All" from Gravity, which was released September 4, 2012 and peaked at No. 3 on the Billboard 200. The album won the Grammy Award for Best Gospel Album.

Mathai's EP, Girl Like Me, was released on July 4, 2013. Her debut single, "Once Again", was released on March 25, 2013. The EP was written and produced by Mathai and Grammy Award-winning producers Dru Castro and Pierre Medor.

== Personal life ==
Mathai is currently working as a nurse.

Since 2018, she has been married to Binoy Chacko. Upon marriage, she changed her last name, making her name "Sharon Chacko". The couple have two children.
