= Tony Vincent =

American actor, songwriter, singer (born 1973)

- Born: Anthony Peter Strascina; Albuquerque, New Mexico, U.S.
- Genre: Alternative
- Occupations: Actor; singer; songwriter
- Years active: 1993–present
- Website: tonyvincent.com

Tony Vincent (born July 25, 1973) is an American actor, songwriter, and singer known for his work on Broadway, London's West End, and as a finalist on NBC's The Voice. He is based in New York City and Nashville.

== Early career ==
Vincent was born in Albuquerque, New Mexico. His professional career began while attending Belmont University in Nashville, Tennessee. Using the school's recording studio, he recorded what became his first single, "Love Falling Down." It was originally released only to his hometown radio station, KLYT in Albuquerque. The song proved popular when it hit No. 1 on that station's charts, he and a college friend organized a campaign to release the single nationally.

The single was released nationwide in May 1993 and appeared on the national CCM Billboard Hot 100 in July 1993, becoming the first independently released single ever to do so. After signing a recording contract with EMI, Vincent spent six more years recording in Nashville. During that time, Vincent had six #1 songs on Billboard's radio charts and his song, "One Deed", from the album of the same name, was featured in a national United Way of America campaign.

== Musical Theatre ==
In 1998, Vincent moved to New York, and by March 1998 had landed a role in the American touring production of Rent. In January 1999, Vincent returned to New York and made his Broadway debut in the cast of Rent at the Nederlander Theatre, playing the roles of both Roger Davis and Mark Cohen at different time periods.

In 2000, Vincent was cast in the role of Simon Zealotes in the film remake of Jesus Christ Superstar in London. This new production brought about a revival of the show on Broadway, and a last minute cast departure saw Vincent take on the role Judas at composer Andrew Lloyd Webber's request. Vincent's performance as Judas won him a nomination for an Outer Critics award for "Best Featured Actor." Impressed with his Broadway performances, Webber selected Vincent to travel through China in 2001, introducing the composer's music in a cultural exchange production later released on DVD as "Andrew Lloyd Webber-Masterpiece (Live in Beijing)."

In 2001, Vincent landed the lead role of Galileo Figaro in Queen's musical, We Will Rock You on London's West End. He performed the role from May 2002 through November 2003. Vincent also performed "Bohemian Rhapsody" with Queen for the band's June 2002 appearance at Party at the Palace, a celebration of Queen Elizabeth's 50th anniversary as monarch.

The North American premiere of We Will Rock You opened in Las Vegas in 2004. Vincent remained with the show until July 2005, when he returned to New York City to resume work on his solo music career after signing a priority record deal this time via David Massey and Tommy Mottola for Epic Records.

Vincent originated the role of St. Jimmy in American Idiot, the Tony award-winning stage musical based on Green Day's award-winning album of the same name. The production premiered at the Berkeley Repertory Theatre in September 2009 and, after being extended twice, became Berkeley Rep's most popular and highest grossing production.

When American Idiot opened on Broadway at the St. James Theatre on April 20, 2010, Vincent received considerable praise for his portrayal of St. Jimmy. Charles Isherwood of the New York Times praised the show as "performed with galvanizing intensity by a terrific cast, … a pulsating portrait of wasted youth that invokes all the standard genre conventions … only to transcend them through the power of its music and the artistry of its execution," and describing Vincent's performance as having "mesmerizing vitality and piercing vocalism." Peter Travers of Rolling Stone in his review of American Idiot, wrote "the standout is vocal powerhouse Tony Vincent as St. Jimmy, Johnny's dealer and toxic ideology," American Idiot... cuts its own path to the heart. You won't know what hit you. American Idiot knows no limits – it's a global knockout."

In April 2010, Vincent, along with co-star John Gallagher, Jr., received a 2010 Drama League Award nomination for the Distinguished Performance Award.

Vincent played his final performance as St. Jimmy on December 30, 2010, and was succeeded by Green Day frontman Billie Joe Armstrong. The show closed on Broadway on April 24, 2011.

Vincent returned to Broadway in the production of Rocktopia in March 2018.

== "NBC's The Voice" ==
Vincent was a contestant on the second season of the hit reality talent show The Voice. Cee Lo Green was so impressed by Vincent's powerful (blind audition) performance of We Are The Champions that he snatched him up for his Team (TeamCeeLo) and commented that Freddie Mercury would have been proud. Vincent won his Battle Round against teammate Justin Hopkins singing Journey's "Faithfully".

During the Live round, Vincent sang Tears for Fears' "Everybody Wants to Rule the World", but received mixed reviews from the judges, who felt the song held back his true voice dynamic. Vincent ended up in the Sing-Off of the Last Chance Performances, singing Eurythmics' "Sweet Dreams", but was eliminated as a finalist from the competition.

== Music career ==
Vincent released three solo albums during the 90's – Love Falling Down (1993), Tony Vincent (1995) and One Deed (1997).

In 2007 Vincent released a five-song EP entitled A Better Way, a collaboration with platinum-selling producer Adam Anders, and in 2012 released his highly anticipated studio project, In My Head, which he co-produced with Swedish artist Ulf Dernevik.

Along with performing rock-focused symphonic performances with orchestras across the globe, Vincent currently operates his independent recording studio, SoundShop370, in South Nashville, where he is actively involved in producing, songwriting, mixing and collaborating with artists. He also leads a comprehensive artist development program for aspiring contemporary artists, musicians, and musical theater performers.

== Side Projects ==
In 2005, the multi-platinum vocal group Il Divo included the song, Hoy Que Ya No Estas Aqui (As Far As Any Man Can See), co-written by Vincent and Jorgen Elofsson (translation by Rudy Perez), on their self-titled debut album.

Tony has been successful in the voice over world, and, to date, has done voice over work for Pepperidge Farm, Mrs Fields and for the Fisher-Price interactive game, I Can Play Guitar.

Vincent has been a guest artist with The SAS Band for several live concerts in the UK. He is also a recurring guest artist at the Vanemuine Theater in Tartu, Estonia as well as a recurring guest artist at BBC Radio 2's rock concerts around the world with the BBC Concert Orchestra. The concerts, produced in conjunction with the BBC and the Maltese Tourism Authority in Valletta, Malta and presented by Gary Davies, draw thousands each year.

== Philanthropy ==
Vincent supports the work of the Broadway Dreams Foundation and regularly participates in their intensive theatre training courses as a faculty member and guest instructor.

Vincent is also a regular guest artist at David Foster Foundation events to support families whose children are undergoing life-saving organ transplants. The Foundation's 2022 gala raised over $11.2 million in one night.

A native of Albuquerque, NM, Vincent supports his home town chapter of United Way. His single "One Deed" was used for a nation-wide fundraising campaign, One Great Deed. In 2024, he returned to Albuquerque to perform at the organization's 90th anniversary celebration.

== Personal life ==
Vincent was married to vocalist Aspen Vincent from 2008-2020. They share two children: a daughter born in 2012 and a son born in 2018. They are divorced as of 2020 and both living in Nashville, Tennessee. Vincent remarried in 2022.

== Discography ==
Year	Title	Label	Producer
1993	Love Falling Down (EP)	Adobe Flats Music	Tony Vincent
1995	Tony Vincent	EMI/CMG	Charlie Peacock and Brent Bourgeois
1997	One Deed	EMI/CMG	Dennis Matkosky
2001	Jesus Christ Superstar	Sony Music	Simon Lee
2004	We Will Rock You (The Original London Cast Recording)	EMI UK	Brian May
2005	Killer Queen: A Tribute to Queen	Hollywood	Oliver Leiber
2007	A Better Way (EP)	Adobe Flats Music	Adam Anders
2010	"21 Guns", featuring American Idiot cast	Warner Bros	Billie Joe Armstrong
2010	American Idiot: The Original Broadway Cast Recording	Warner Bros	Billie Joe Armstrong
2012	"We Are the Champions" (NBC's The Voice)	Universal Republic Records	Bill Appleberry
2012	""Faithfully"" (NBC's The Voice)	Universal Republic Records	
2012	"Everybody Wants to Rule the World" (NBC's The Voice)	Universal Republic Records	
2012	In My Head (EP)	Adobe Flats Music	Tony Vincent / Ulf Dernevik

== Filmography ==
Year	Title	Role
2000	Jesus Christ Superstar	Simon Zealotes
2001	The Music of Andrew Lloyd Webber: Masterpiece Live in Beijing	Himself (concert film)
2007	Fable	Michael
2009	Freud's Magic Powder	El Conquistador
2013	Broadway Idiot	Himself (documentary)

== Stage work ==
Year	Title	Role	Venue
1998	Rent	Swing	First National Tour
1999	Rent	Understudy Roger; Understudy Mark	Broadway
1999	Rent	Mark Cohen	Broadway
2000	Jesus Christ Superstar	Judas Iscariot	Broadway
2002-03	We Will Rock You	Galileo Figaro	West End
2004-05	We Will Rock You	Galileo Figaro	Las Vegas
2009	American Idiot	St. Jimmy	Berkeley Repertory Theatre
2010-11	American Idiot	St. Jimmy	Broadway
2014	Randy Newman's Faust	Henry Faust	Off-Broadway
2018	Rocktopia	Lead	Broadway

== Television ==
Date	Title	Episode	Network	Role
April 1, 2013	The Carrie Diaries	"A First Time For Everything" (#112)	The CW	Gate Keeper
November 25, 2015 – January 2, 2024	Nature Cat	Interlude segments, "Pet Sounds" (#104b), "Freezin' in the Summer Season" (#302a)	PBS Kids	Dog Gone male performer
