= Kim Yarbrough =

American singer and actress (born 1971)

- Born: August 1, 1971 (age 54); Memphis, Tennessee, U.S.
- Genres: R&B
- Occupations: Singer-songwriter, actress
- Instruments: Vocals, violin
- Years active: 2009–present
- Website: www.kimyarbrough.com

Kim Yarbrough (born August 1, 1961) is an American singer and actress.

== Career ==
Kim started acting at the age of 8. Her first short was "2081" as an Orchestra Member, where she was the featured violinist. She then appeared on major TV series such as "Bones" and "Sonny with a Chance" as a larger woman and a gospel singer. Yarbrough then appeared in the TV Movie "Dad's Home" as Doris. In 2010 she guest starred on "The Defenders" in the pilot episode as the Clerk. She then played a recurring character part of the Requisitions Officer in the TV series "Dexter". She later appeared in another TV movie, "Grace", and then a short, "Mushroom Pizza". She joined the recurring cast of "Conan" playing numerous characters from 2010 to 2011. She is currently working on another movie called "Somewhere Slow". Recently she has co-starred in episodes of "Vegas", "Hollywood Heights", and "2 Broke Girls". Kim will also be playing a recurring role as Madame Labuef on the new Nickelodeon television series, "The Haunted Hathaways".

== The Voice ==
Episode	Round	Song	Result
2	Blind Auditions	"Tell Me Something Good"	Advanced
7	Battle Rounds	"No More Drama"	Advanced
12	Live Performances	"Rolling in the Deep"	Bottom 3
13	Last Chance Performances	"Spotlight"	Eliminated

Kim competed in the second season of The Voice. After having 2 judges turn around in the blind audition, she chose Adam Levine as her coach. In the battle rounds she sang "No More Drama" with fellow team-mate Whitney Meyer. After the battle, Kim was crowned the winner. In the live performances she sang "Rolling in the Deep" by Adele. In the eliminations, she was one of the bottom three on her team. For her song she chose "Spotlight" by Jennifer Hudson. In the end, she along with Karla Davis were eliminated in favor of Katrina Parker. She came in 18th place out of 48 contestants. She returned in the finale and sang "Superstition" alongside former contestants Naia Kete, Sera Hill and Cheesa.

== Filmography ==
Feature film
Year	Film	Role	Notes
2013	Somewhere Slow	Tanisha	
2018	Spider-Man: Into the Spider-Verse	Alchemax Scientist in Cafeteria (voice)	Cameo
Film Made for Television or Video
Year	Film	Role	Notes
2009	2081	Orchestra Member	Short
2010	Dad's Home	Doris	TV movie
2011	Grace	Church choir member	TV movie
2011	Mushroom Pizza	Destiny	Short
Television
Year	Title	Role	Notes
2010	Dexter	Requisitions Officer	Recurring (2 episodes)
2010–2011	Conan	Mother Hubbard/Lana Hubbard	Recurring (3 episodes)
2013–2014	The Haunted Hathaways	Madame Labuef	Recurring guest star (4 episodes)
2021–2022	Kid Cosmic	Flo (voice)	Recurring (Season 1), Main (Season 2-3)
Television guest appearances
Year	Title	Role	Episode title/Notes
2009	Bones	Large Woman	"The Foot in the Foreclosure"
2010	Sonny with a Chance	Gospel Singer	"Gassie Passes"
2010	The Defenders	Clerk	"Pilot"
2011	It's Always Sunny in Philadelphia	Backup Singer No. 2	"Frank's Brother"
2012	The Voice	Herself	as a contestant
2012	Vegas	Alice	"(Il)Legitimate"
2012	Hollywood Heights	Vocal Coach	"Eddie Takes Off"
2012	2 Broke Girls	Darlene	"And the Pre-Approved Credit Card"
2013	Southland	Adeline	"Under the Big Top"
2014	New Girl	Another Teacher	"Fired Up"
2019	9-1-1	April	"Chimney Begins"

== Discography ==
=== Albums ===
Year	Album details	Peak chart positions	
Year	Album details	US	US Heat
2013	Brand New Day (Strong Enough): Released:2013; Label: Format: CD, digital download	–	–

=== Extended plays ===
Year	Album details	Peak chart positions	
Year	Album details	US	US Heat
2009	Dharma 888: Released: May 26, 2009; Label: Format: CD, digital download	–	–
