= Lex Land =

North American musician

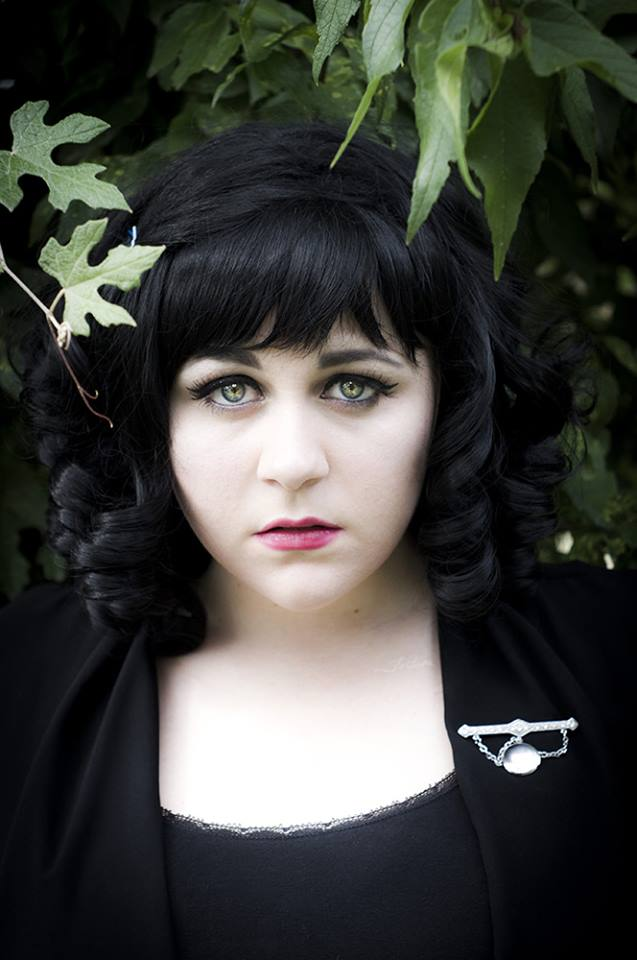

Background information
- Also known as: Holly Frost
- Born: Alexa Holland
- Genres: Jazz, alternative rock, pop rock, folk
- Occupations: Singer, musician, songwriter
- Instruments: Vocals, Guitar, Piano, Ukulele, Bass
- Years active: 2003–present
- Parent: Dexter Holland
- Website: hollyfrost.com

Alexa Holland, known by her stage name Lex Land, is an American singer-songwriter and jazz vocalist from Los Angeles, currently residing in Austin, Texas. She was a contestant on the second season of NBC's singing competition The Voice. Land also fronts three other projects: Moorhaunter, One Big Dark Room, and The Kremer Land Swing Band. She is the daughter of Dexter Holland, the lead vocalist of The Offspring.

Intelligent Noise Records released her first two albums, Orange Days on Lemon Street in 2008, and Were My Sweetheart to Go... in 2011. Both albums had songs featured on television programs.

In 2009, she performed as the last live in-studio guest for NBC's Last Call With Carson Daly. She has performed live twice on Los Angeles station KCRW's Morning Becomes Eclectic: once in 2009 and again in 2011.

== Personal life ==
Holland is the daughter of Dexter Holland, lead singer, rhythm guitarist and primary songwriter of the American punk rock band the Offspring.

== Discography ==
- Orange Days on Lemon Street (Studio album, 2008)
- Lex Land: Live from KCRW (Live album, 2009)
- Were My Sweetheart to Go (Studio album, 2011)
- "Santa Baby" (Single, 2011)
- "I Can't Make You Love Me (The Voice Performance)" (Single, 2012)
- A Valentine EP (Studio album, 2018)

=== Background vocals ===
- "Build Me This" Joshua James, 2009
- "The Path You Came Here By" Jordan Moser, 2009
- "Transatlantic Hope" Joast, 2010
- "Won Over Frequency" Gavin Castleton, 2010
- "Paper Anchors" Jarrett Killen, 2010
- "Accidental Thief" Matt the Electrician, 2011
- "Sleeping Bag" Jordan Moser, 2012
- "Circus Heart" Rebecca Loebe, 2012
- "Kaleidoscope" David Karsten Daniels, 2016
- "Christmas Street" Bob Schneider, 2016

== The Voice ==
Round	Order	Song	Original Artist	Notes
Blind Auditions	6	"I Can't Make You Love Me"	Bonnie Raitt	Adam Levine, CeeLo Green, and Blake Shelton turned their chairs, Joined Team Blake
Battle Rounds	2	"Pumped Up Kicks"	Foster the People	Eliminated; Lost to Charlotte Sometimes
