= Jermaine Paul =

American singer

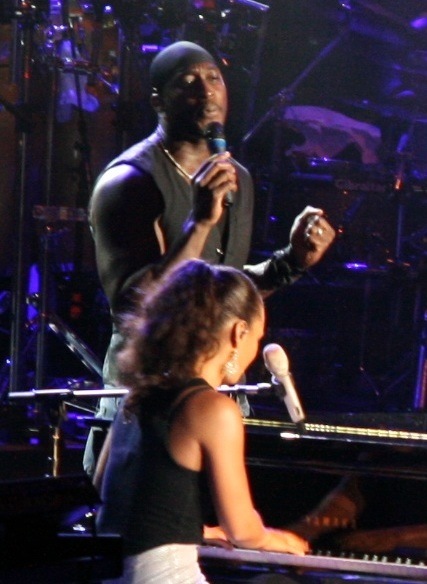
- Paul performing with Alicia Keys in the foreground, 2006

Background information
- Born: Jeremiah Jermaine Paul; July 26, 1979 (age 47); Harriman, New York, U.S.
- Genres: R&B, gospel
- Occupations: Singer, songwriter
- Years active: 1996–present
- Formerly of: 1Accord
- Website: jermainepaul.com

Jeremiah Jermaine Paul (born July 26, 1979) is an American R&B singer. He is best known for his backing vocals on Alicia Keys' singles "Diary", "Unbreakable", and her cover of Marvin Gaye's "If This World Were Mine". The former of which received a nomination for Best R&B Performance by a Duo or Group with Vocals at the 47th Annual Grammy Awards. Paul was initially a member of the short-lived R&B group 1Accord, who signed with Shaquille O'Neal's T.W.Is.M. Records in 1994.

In 2012, Paul won season 2 of American reality competition series The Voice. That same year, his cover of R. Kelly's "I Believe I Can Fly" peaked at number 83 on the Billboard Hot 100.

== Early life ==
Jeremiah Jermaine Paul was born on July 26, 1979, in Harriman, New York, and was raised in Spring Valley, New York, the fifth of 10 children. His father encouraged his involvement in music by "turning their living room into a musical performance area". "It was loaded with instruments—piano, drums and guitars—and some of the kids, including Jermaine, formed a group to perform gospel songs in local churches." By the time he was 12 years old, he began to acquire a reputation for singing at local churches and talent shows with his family. Jermaine joined numerous adult choirs.

At the age of two, Jermaine and his brother moved to Alabama with their grandfather. There, he was introduced to the guitar. He played his step-grandmother's old Gibson guitar at the local church. With some knowledge of the guitar, and the yearning to go back to New York, he wrote his first song.

At the age of 14, he moved back to his birthplace in up-state New York to Harriman (Hudson Valley). There he attended Monroe-Woodbury High School and was introduced to rock and jazz. While taking guitar lessons he was selected to join the all-state, all-county chorus, and the classically trained high school voice ensemble.

== Career ==
At 15, Paul joined a quartet group named 1Accord and signed to basketball star Shaquille O'Neal's label, T.W.Is.M Records. He began writing and producing songs of his own. Paul auditioned for the first season of American Idol but did not receive any callbacks from the producers. He began recording backing vocals for artists such as Alicia Keys, Mary J. Blige, Joss Stone, Blackstreet and Jaguar Wright. He had a Grammy nomination at the 48th Grammy Awards in the Grammy Award for Best R&B Performance by a Duo or Group with Vocals category ("If This World Were Mine") by Alicia Keys featuring Jermaine Paul. The track was from the J Records album So Amazing: An All-Star Tribute to Luther Vandross.

=== The Voice (2012) ===
In 2012, he auditioned for the 2nd season of The Voice singing "Complicated" from Avril Lavigne. Two of the four coaches turned their chairs (Blake Shelton and CeeLo Green), with Paul opting to be on Team Blake. He was the eventual winner of the second season.

Performances on The Voice
Show	Song	Original Artist	Order	Result
Blind Audition	"Complicated"	Avril Lavigne	2.14	CeeLo Green and Blake Shelton turned Paul joined Blake Shelton's Team
Battles (Top 48)	"Get Outta My Dreams, Get into My Car" (vs. ALyX)	Billy Ocean	8.4	Saved by Blake Shelton
Live Show	"Livin' on a Prayer"	Bon Jovi	10.1	Saved (Public Vote)
Quarter-Finals (First Week)	"Against All Odds"	Phil Collins	12.7	Saved (Public Vote)
Semi-Finals	"Open Arms"	Journey	18.5	Safe (123 Points)
Live Finale (Final 4)	"I Believe I Can Fly"	R. Kelly	20.1	Winner
Live Finale (Final 4)	"God Gave Me You"	Dave Barnes	20.8	Winner
Live Finale (Final 4)	"Soul Man" (w/ Blake Shelton)	Sam and Dave	20.10	Winner

=== After The Voice ===
His winning song, a cover of "I Believe I Can Fly" made it up to #83 on the US Billboard Hot 100. The follow-up, "Soul Man", with his coach Blake Shelton did not break the Hot 100, reaching just #108.

His single "I Believe in This Life" reportedly taken from his forthcoming album premiered on The Voice on November 8, 2012.

== Personal life ==
Since 2012, Paul has been an ordained minister in the United Methodist Church. As of 2025, he is the pastor at Golden Hill United Methodist Church in Bridgeport, Connecticut.

== Discography ==
=== Singles ===
Year	Single	Peak positions	Album
Year	Single	US	Album
2012	"Complicated"	—	Highlights from Season 2 The Voice
2012	"Get Outta My Dreams, Get into My Car"	—	Highlights from Season 2 The Voice
2012	"Livin' on a Prayer"	—	Highlights from Season 2 The Voice
2012	"Against All Odds"	—	Highlights from Season 2 The Voice
2012	"Open Arms"	—	Highlights from Season 2 The Voice
2012	"I Believe I Can Fly"	83	Highlights from Season 2 The Voice
2012	"Soul Man"^{A} (with coach, Blake Shelton)	108	Highlights from Season 2 The Voice
2012	"I Believe in This Life"		
"—" denotes releases that did not chart

- ^{A}Did not enter the Hot 100 but charted on Bubbling Under Hot 100 Singles.

=== Appearances ===
Singles as backing vocalist

Year	Song	Album
1996	"Don't Wanna Be Alone" (Shaquille O'Neal featuring 1Accord)	You Can't Stop the Reign
1997	"Don't Stop, Don't Quit" (1Accord)	Booty Call Soundtrack
1998	"Rivers" (Shaquille O'Neal featuring 1Accord)	Respect
2003	"Diary" (Alicia Keys featuring Tony! Toni! Toné! and Jermaine Paul)	The Diary of Alicia Keys
2005	"Unbreakable" (Alicia Keys featuring Jermaine Paul)	Unplugged
2005	"Gold Digger" (Remix) (Kanye West featuring Focus)	Late Registration
2005	"If This World Were Mine" (Alicia Keys featuring Jermaine Paul)	So Amazing: An All-Star Tribute to Luther Vandross
2008	"The Preamble"	The Preamble
2009	"Airplane"	

Awards and achievements
Preceded by Javier Colon	The Voice (American); Winner; 2012 (Spring)	Succeeded by Cassadee Pope
Preceded by "Stitch by Stitch"	The Voice (American); Winner's song "I Believe I Can Fly"; 2012 (Spring)	Succeeded by Cry
