= God's Top Ten =

Single by INXS

from the album Switch
- Released: 2006
- Recorded: 2004–2005
- Genre: Alternative rock
- Length: 4:54
- Label: Epic
- Songwriter: Andrew Farriss
- Producer: Guy Chambers

INXS singles chronology
"Perfect Strangers" (2006)	"God's Top Ten" (2006)	"Dream on Black Girl (Original Sin)" (2006)

"God's Top Ten" is a song by Australian band INXS released as the fifth single from their eleventh studio album, Switch (2005), the first with new lead singer, J.D. Fortune, winner of the Rock Star: INXS competition. The song was written by keyboardist Andrew Farriss as a gift for INXS's late vocalist Michael Hutchence's daughter, Tiger Hutchence-Geldof. The song also features vocals by Suzie McNeil and was released as a single in 2006, but only in Poland and Canada as an airplay single, where it peaked at No. 18 and No. 88 respectively.

== Song information ==
"God's Top Ten" was written by INXS guitarist and keyboardist, Andrew Farriss, and is predominantly about the late INXS frontman Michael Hutchence (1960–1997), his partner, Paula Yates (1959–2000), and their daughter, Tiger Lily. Andrew and Tim Farriss (his brother, on guitar) have both separately said in TV interviews that this song is actually a gift for Tiger Lily. In addition to new lead singer, J. D. Fortune's vocals, "God's Top Ten" also features the vocals of his fellow Rock Star: INXS contestant Suzie McNeil. Jane Stevenson of the Toronto Sun reviewed Switch (November 2005) and described this track "A pretty piano hook kicks off this soulful, strings-laden tribute to [the couple and their daughter] with McNeil and Fortune trading verses and singing together".

During a radio interview with the BBC, Andrew changed the lyrics around to the song from "When you hear his songs, on the radio, I don't need to tell you what you already know" to "When she hears his songs on the radio, I don't need to tell her what she already knows" and also changed "He's on God's top ten, where heaven never ends" to "He's on God's top ten, he'll always be my friend". The term "God's Top Ten" was also used in the band's song "Here Comes", off their album Shabooh Shoobah. The lyrics read "Here comes my kamikaze, Here comes God's top ten, Nothing to be done to stop it, Nothing to get in its way".

== Charts ==
Chart (2006)	Peak position
Canadian Hot 100	88
Polish Singles Chart	18
