= Billy Sawilchik =

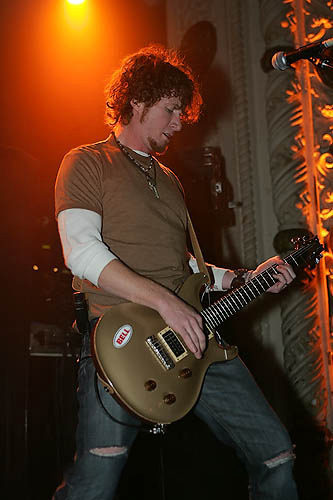
- Billy Sawilchik at Metro Chicago, Illinois 2006

Background information
- Born: William Craig Sawilchik; July 28, 1971 (age 54); Oak Lawn, Illinois, United States
- Genres: Alternative rock, Indie rock, Post-grunge
- Occupation: Guitarist
- Instruments: Guitar, acoustic guitar
- Years active: 1994-present
- Label: Epic Records
- Website: Official Website; Lovehammers Website

William Craig Sawilchik (born July 28, 1971 in Oak Lawn, Illinois, United States), better known as Billy Sawilchik, is the lead guitarist, co-songwriter and back up vocalist for the band The Lovehammers.

In 1994, Billy joined the band (then known under the name Swinging Lovehammers) and recorded their first full-length album Ultrasound in 1997.

Sawilchik's playing style has been described as very experimental. This experimental flair is most apparent in his live performances, during which Sawilchik often improvises or retools his solos and riffs. His influences range from classic rock monoliths such as Jimmy Page to rockabilly/blues legends Carl Perkins and Chuck Berry to punk, pop-punk and hardcore bands like Social Distortion and Face To Face. Sawilchik has finely crafted these influences over the years to create his own distinct sound evident in both his live performances and recordings with The Lovehammers.

He is married with two sons.

== Early career ==
Born to Rich and Beverly Sawilchik, Billy is the second to youngest of his two brothers and older sister. At the age of 12, he taught himself to play guitar. He attended St Laurence High School then, Illinois State University where he majored in Business Marketing and Advertising. His first band was called EZ Access. In college he joined the band 9 Arms - a five person band with a one armed drummer. During a show with 9 Arms the original line up of Swinging Lovehammers (Marty Casey, Dino Kourelis, Bob Kourelis and Ben Kelly) recruited him to play a set with them at a house party. In May 1994 he left 9 Arms and officially joined Swinging Lovehammers. Upon first entering the band, he split guitar duties with bandmate and guitarist Ben Kelly until his departure in 2003. Sawilchik then became and remained the band's only lead guitarist. Swinging Lovehammers officially changed their name to The Lovehammers in August 2001.

On November 6, 2001 the band re-released their second LP L'Strange. It featured the song "Real Man", a comment on the dichotomy of sexual politics and the male/female power exchange. Sawilchik co-wrote the song with lead singer Marty Casey and came up with the concept while at a stripclub in Wisconsin. "I was just thinking through the eyes of a dancer and their perception as to what role they are to play to the crowd. Marty embellished the complete lyrics after I gave brought [sic] the chorus and theme."

== Rockstar: INXS / Major label debut ==
In the summer of 2005 The Lovehammers took a short hiatus while their lead singer, Marty Casey entered the reality television singing competition Rockstar: INXS wherein INXS searched for a replacement lead singer for their reunion. Billy Sawilchik supported Casey in his endeavor and was even spotted on television in the audience during one of Casey's performances. When Casey was named runner up, INXS invited The Lovehammers to play as the opening band on their tour. The Lovehammers (who had always been an indie band) were immediately signed to the Sony/Epic label where they released a new full-length CD under the moniker Marty Casey & Lovehammers. The album was composed mostly of re-recordings and re-workings of old songs from their other indie releases with the exception of one song, "Casualty". The new disc was well received for the most part. Although some critics claimed that major label production had erased some of the signature raw energy of The Lovehammers, the album reviews had been largely favorable, although a less stellar review cited Sawilchik's performance as a great contribution to the album's sound, referring to him as a "capable axeman". They were a featured artist on VH1.com and performed a short acoustic set for VH1's VSpot. In 2006, The Lovehammers headlined their own North American tour, dubbing it 'Get Live'. The Lovehammers are still on Sony/Epic.

== Discography ==
=== Studio albums ===
Year	Title	Label
1997	Ultrasound	REEP Records
2002	L'Strange	REEP Records
2003	Murder on My Mind	Swinging Lovehammers Records
2006	Marty Casey and Lovehammers	Epic Records
2009	Heavy Crown	REEP Records/Fontana/INgrooves
2012	Set Fire	REEP Records/Fontana/INgrooves

== Gear ==
- Guitars
  - Washburn Damen Idol
  - Washburn Pilsen Idol
  - Black Gretsch Customized Duo Jet
  - Gibson Firebird
  - Gibson Les Paul Standard
  - Gibson Black Custom 85'
  - Paul Reed Smith Standard Gold Top
  - Gibson SG Historic Reissue VOS
- Amps
  - Marshall
- Strings
  - Dean Markley Strings

== Selected interviews and endorsements ==
- Lovehammers Fanclub Interview: A Conversation With Lovehammers
- Billy Sawilchik Endorses Dean Markley Strings (QuickTime Video)
- Billy Sawilchik on KLITE Manilla Radio Station
- Billy Sawilchik Washburn Guitar Artist Page
