= Pretty Vegas =

2005 single by INXS

Single by INXS

from the album Switch
- Released: 19 September 2005
- Genre: Rock
- Length: 3:26
- Label: Epic
- Songwriters: Andrew Farriss; J.D. Fortune; Marty Casey; Jordis Unga
- Producer: Guy Chambers

INXS singles chronology
"Mystify (Remix)" (2004)	"Pretty Vegas" (2005)	"Afterglow" (2006)

"Pretty Vegas" is a song by Australian rock band INXS. It was released in September 2005 as the lead single from their 11th studio album, Switch, and the first with new Canadian lead singer J.D. Fortune, winner of the Rock Star: INXS competition.

== Release ==
"Pretty Vegas" was first released exclusively through the iTunes Store on 19 September 2005. A video for the song was released on the same day. The song debuted on the show Rock Star: INXS during the time when Fortune was vying for the lead vocalist spot in INXS. The eight contestants were challenged to write lyrics to a melody written by Andrew Farriss. They were divided into two teams of four. When Fortune did not see eye-to-eye with his team (which included runner-up Marty Casey), he decided to venture out on his own and write his own lyrics.

== Chart performance ==
The song peaked at number 37 on the US Billboard Hot 100 singles chart on 22 October 2005. After the release of INXS' album Switch, the single reached number seven on the Billboard Adult Top 40 chart. The single was also somewhat of a comeback song in Australia, becoming their first ARIA top 10 single in 14 years, peaking at number nine. The song was certified gold by the Recording Industry Association of America (RIAA) on 26 January 2006. The single was also certified gold by Music Canada on 8 March 2006 for sales of over 10,000 digital copies.

== Track listings ==
Australian maxi-CD single

1. "Pretty Vegas" (album version) – 3:27
2. "Pretty Vegas" (live) – 4:17

Digital download

1. "Pretty Vegas" – 3:26

== Charts ==
=== Weekly charts ===
Chart (2005–2006)	Peak position
Australia (ARIA)	9
Canada Hot AC Top 30 (Radio & Records)	2
Canada Rock Top 30 (Radio & Records)	3
New Zealand (Recorded Music NZ)	7
US Billboard Hot 100	37
US Adult Pop Airplay (Billboard)	7

=== Year-end charts ===
Chart (2006)	Position
US Adult Top 40 (Billboard)	27

== Certifications ==
Region	Certification	Certified units/sales
Canada (Music Canada)	Gold	10,000^{*}
United States (RIAA)	Gold	500,000^{*}
^{*} Sales figures based on certification alone.

== Release history ==
Region	Date	Format	Label	Ref.
United States	19 September 2005	Digital download	Epic	
United States	17 October 2005	Hot adult contemporary radio	Epic	
Australia	14 November 2005	CD	Epic	
