= Mig =

Mig, MiG, or MIG may refer to:

== Business ==
- MiG, a Russian aircraft corporation
  - Any of the MiG aircraft
- Marfin Investment Group, Greek private equity company
- Atlas Arteria, formerly Macquarie Infrastructure Group, toll roads company
- Mortgage indemnity guarantee

== Other uses ==
- Mig33 mobile social networking, Australian digital media company
- Mig Flash, an accessory for playing backed up Nintendo Switch games
- Luton Town MIGs, English football hooligans
- Monokine Induced by Gamma interferon, or CXCL9
- IATA code for Mianyang Nanjiao Airport, China
- Mig Ayesa, an Australian singer-songwriter
  - MiG (album), a 2007 album by Mig Ayesa
- Metal inert gas welding or MIG welding
