= Devil's Party =

Single by INXS

from the album Switch
- Released: 4 May 2006
- Recorded: 2005
- Genre: Alternative rock
- Label: Epic
- Songwriters: J. D. Fortune; Andrew Farriss
- Producer: Guy Chambers

INXS singles chronology
"Afterglow" (2006)	"Devil's Party" (2006)	"Perfect Strangers" (2006)

"Devil's Party" is a song by Australian band INXS. It was released in May 2006 as the third single from their eleventh studio album Switch (2005), which was also the first with new lead singer J.D. Fortune, winner of the Rock Star: INXS competition.

It received considerable airplay in Canada, reaching number 6 on their Adult Contemporary chart and number 18 on their Rock chart.

== Charts ==
Chart (2006)	Peak position
Canada Hot AC Top 40 (Radio & Records)	6
Canada Rock Top 30 (Radio & Records)	18
