= Afterglow (INXS song) =

Single by INXS

from the album Switch
- Released: 25 April 2006
- Genre: Bhangra rock, soft rock
- Length: 4:09
- Label: Epic
- Songwriters: Andrew Farriss, Desmond Child
- Producer: Guy Chambers

INXS singles chronology
"Pretty Vegas" (2005)	"Afterglow" (2006)	"Devil's Party" (2006)

"Afterglow" is a song by Australian rock band INXS. It was released in April 2006 as the second single from the band's eleventh studio album, Switch (2005).

== Background and writing ==
The song was written by Andrew Farriss and Desmond Child, and was a tribute to Michael Hutchence, one of INXS' founders, who committed suicide in 1997. In singing the song, J.D. Fortune, winner of Rock Star: INXS, described his role in Hutchence's legacy—his "afterglow". It is a bhangra rock song written in F sharp minor.

== Music video ==
The video for the single features actress Estella Warren and J. D. Fortune in a loft in downtown Los Angeles. J. D. Fortune walks alone on the empty Sixth Street Viaduct and is later joined by the rest of the band of INXS.

== Critical reception ==
Music critic Matt Collar of the publication AllMusic praised the song as an "epic ballad", noting how it drew influence from U2's track "With or Without You".

The song has been described as "bhangra rock", with melody reminiscent of INXS' earlier work with Hutchence.

== Chart performance ==
"Afterglow" peaked at number 24 in Australia on the ARIA Singles chart, spending 10 weeks in the top 50. The song reached number 22 on the US Billboard Adult Top 40 chart, and number 20 on the Hot Adult Top 40 Tracks chart.

== Charts ==
=== Weekly charts ===
Chart (2006)	Peak position
Australia (ARIA)	24
Canada Hot AC Top 30 (Radio & Records)	4
US Billboard Hot Adult Top 40 Tracks	20
