= Perfect Strangers (INXS song) =

Single by INXS

from the album Switch
- Released: 2006
- Recorded: 2005
- Genre: Rock
- Length: 4:12
- Label: Epic
- Songwriter(s): David Scott Alpsach (Scott Spock), Garry Gary Beers, Tony Bruno, Graham Edwards, Lauren Christy, Shelly Peiken
- Producer(s): Guy Chambers

INXS singles chronology
"Devil's Party" (2006)	"Perfect Strangers" (2006)	"God's Top Ten" (2006)

"Perfect Strangers" is a song by Australian band INXS released as the fourth single from their eleventh studio album Switch, which was also the first album with lead singer J.D. Fortune, winner of the Rock Star: INXS competition. The single was released in 2005.

The song's music video was filmed at an INXS concert in Vancouver, Canada.
