= Migs =

Migs or MIGS may refer to:

- Luton Town MIGs, a football firm following English side Luton Town
- Mastercard Internet Gateway Service
- Metal-induced gap states
- Miguel Cabrera (born 1983), Venezuelan baseball player
- Minimally invasive glaucoma surgery
- Montreal Institute for Genocide and Human Rights Studies
- Montreal International Games Summit

== See also ==
- Mig (disambiguation)
