= Jordis Unga =

American singer

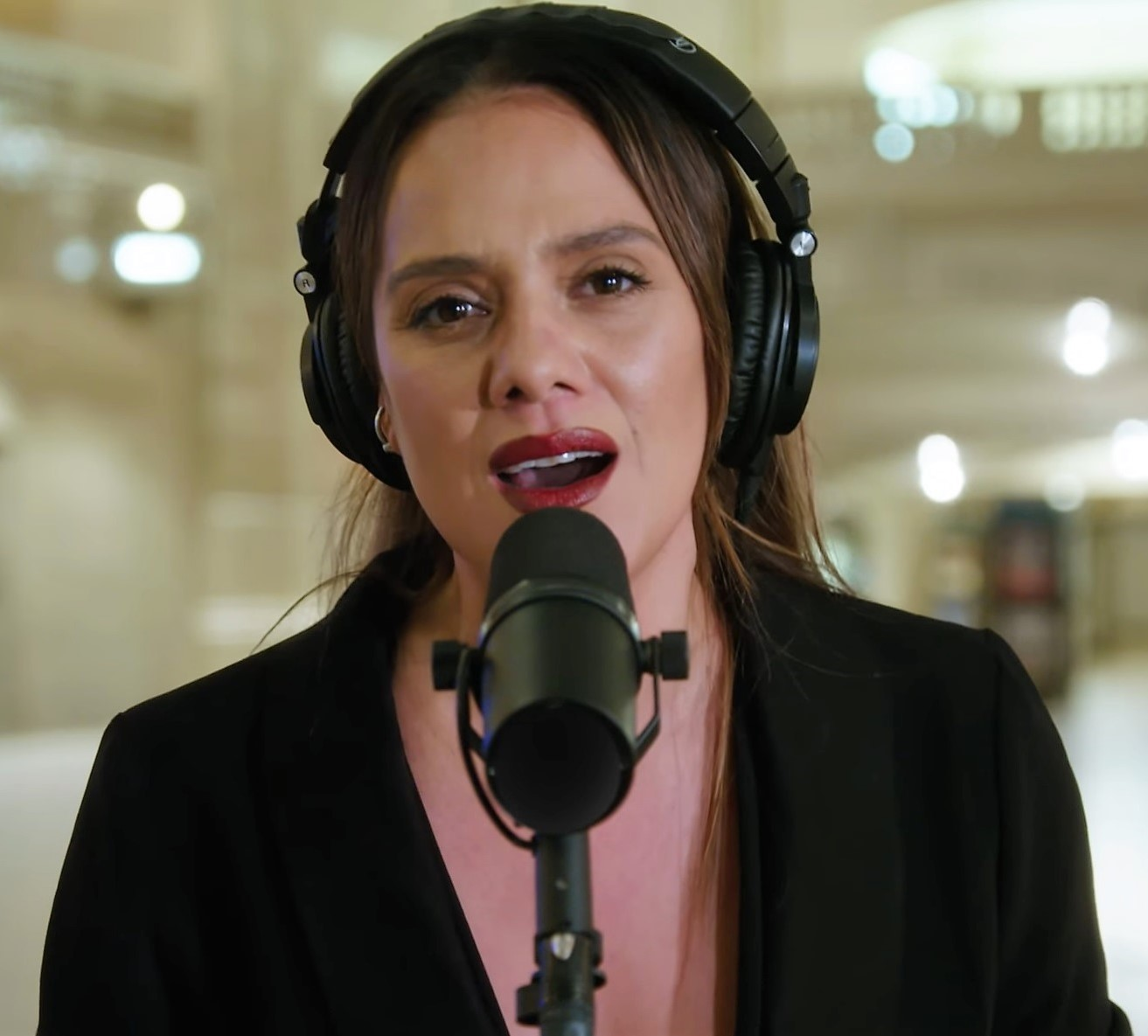
- Unga performs "This is Me" for the 2020 United States Census

Background information
- Born: Jordis Losana Sikahema Unga; August 6, 1982 (age 44); Chicopee, Massachusetts, U.S.
- Origin: Forest Lake, Minnesota, U.S.
- Genres: Rock; R&B; Soul
- Occupations: Singer, songwriter
- Years active: 2002–present

Jordis Losana Sikahema Unga (born August 6, 1982) is an American rock singer from Forest Lake, Minnesota. After years of building a cult following in Minneapolis, as a vocalist for The Fighting Tongs and Liars Club, Unga reached international fame for her performances on the first season of the CBS television reality show Rock Star: INXS where 15 contestants competed to become the lead vocalist for the Australian rock band INXS. She finished fifth overall. Unga was also a contestant on the second season of NBC's The Voice as a part of "Team Blake". She was eliminated on April 16, 2012, finishing in the Top 16 of the competition. In 2014, Unga released her debut album, A Letter from Home.

== Biography ==
=== Early years ===
Unga comes from a musical family. Her father, originally from Tonga, moved the family around a lot when she was young. Eventually the family settled down in St. Paul, Minnesota when she was about 10 years old. Through her aunt, she is related to Sione Vailahi, a professional wrestler.

Unga attended Forest Lake Area High School, and, in 2000, the Perpich Center for Arts Education for her senior year of high school where she studied music.

Early 2002, Unga was the front singer for The Fighting Tongs. The band adopted the name from the movie Big Trouble in Little China. The band supported Twisted Sister, Anthrax, Sevendust and Damageplan. It was dissolved after recording a self-financed EP, Horseshoes and Hand Grenades. Ex-members including Unga, drummer Corey Frazee, guitarist "Moose" Hitchcock and bassist Josh Hoglund formed "Liars Club".

Unga first appeared on television as a contestant on Star Search (2004) but was knocked out of the competition in the first round.

=== Rock Star: INXS (2005) ===
She appeared on the first season of the CBS television reality show Rock Star: INXS where 15 contestants competed to become the lead vocalist for the Australian rock band INXS. Contestants were housed in the Paramour Mansion, and squared off in a singing contest featuring well-known rock songs. Each week, viewers voted for their favorite contestant. The three contestants with the fewest votes performed an INXS song the following night. Except for the second week, each week one finalist was asked to perform an encore performance of the song they performed the night before, noted as an "Encore Performance".

As the youngest contestant at age 22, Unga received international notoriety for her rendition of The Who's 'Baba O'Riley'. Dave Navarro, one of the judges, declared, "Let's close the competition now!" Unga scored high marks in the second round of the competition with Nirvana's "Heart-Shaped Box". Halfway through the competition, Unga was invited by Navarro to perform The Clash's "Should I Stay or Should I Go" with his band Camp Freddy at the West Hollywood House of Blues. Camp Freddy featured former The Cult bassist Billy Morrison on guitar and ex-Jane's Addiction drummer Stephen Perkins.

During the show, Unga achieved the feat of simultaneously having the top four most downloaded songs on MSN Music, reaching the No. 1 position on the MSN charts being an unprecedented feat for an unsigned artist.

Unga's performances on Rock Star: INXS by week of the performance:

- Week 1:
  - Baba O'Riley (The Who)
  - Heart-Shaped Box (Nirvana)
- Week 2:
  - The Reason (Hoobastank)
- Week 3:
  - Gimme Some Lovin' (The Spencer Davis Group)
- Week 4:
  - The Man Who Sold the World (David Bowie) – Encore Performance
- Week 5:
  - Layla (Derek and the Dominos)
- Week 6:
  - Knockin' on Heaven's Door (Bob Dylan)
- Week 7:
  - Dream On (Aerosmith)
- Week 8:
  - Imagine (John Lennon)
  - Listen Like Thieves (INXS) – Bottom 3 Performance
- Week 9:
  - We Are the Champions (Queen)
  - Try Not (Jordis Unga)
  - Us (INXS) – Ensemble of remaining contestants with INXS
  - Need You Tonight (INXS) – 'Bottom 3 Performance'

Unga placed fifth after being eliminated on September 7, 2005, but left the show with an Epic Records recording contract.

=== After Rock Star: INXS ===
After the competition, Unga spent time writing songs and recording demos for her debut album, but it was never released. Epic Records paired her with various collaborators, including David Hodges and the duo Anne Preven and Scott Cutler of Ednaswap.

Unga's first official live performance was October 15, 2005, singing the national anthem at Staples Center in Los Angeles, California for the boxing event 'The Rematch; Mora vs. Manfredo Jr.'

Unga was invited by Yolanda 'Lonnie' and Muhammad Ali to perform at the Grand Opening for the Muhammad Ali Center located in Louisville, Kentucky on November 19, 2005. She performed John Lennon's 'Imagine'. As a part of the ceremonies, Unga shared the stage with James Taylor, Richie Havens, Hootie and the Blowfish, Jim Carrey, Chris Tucker and Herbie Hancock. Other celebrities in attendance were President Bill Clinton, Angelina Jolie, Brad Pitt, B.B. King, Evander Holyfield, and Montel Williams.

Unga has co-written music with Oscar-nominated songwriters Anne Preven and Scott Cutler, Grammy winning artist and producer David Hodges, and Kevin Griffin (lead singer of Better than Ezra).

=== In The Voice (2012) ===
In 2012, Jordis Unga took part in the second season of the American reality television series The Voice. On the program broadcast on February 13, 2012, she sang "Maybe I'm Amazed" from Paul McCartney. Three of the 4 judges, Cee-Lo Green, Christina Aguilera and Blake Shelton, hit their "I Want You" buttons. Unga eventually chose Blake Shelton as mentor becoming part of the 12-member "Team Blake".

On March 5, 2012, Unga defeated Brian Fuente in the Battle Rounds to advance to the Live Shows.

Unga was eliminated in the quarterfinal round on April 16, 2012. On the finale results show, she was called back by finalist Tony Lucca to perform Fleetwood Mac's "Go Your Own Way" with him as one of his final performances.

=== A Letter from Home (2012–present) ===
In 2012, Jordis started a Kickstarter campaign in order to release her debut album 'A Letter from Home'. The campaign gained 1,424 backers and pledged $75,949 (with a goal of $33,300), and raised $45,000 within the first three days. However, Unga's Kickstarter campaign became the subject of multiple Federal Trade Commission complaints due to unfulfilled rewards.

== Discography ==
=== Studio albums ===
- A Letter from Home (2014)

=== Compilations ===
- A Night at the Mayan Theatre (2005) (includes her interpretation of "Baba O'Riley" by The Who and "The Man Who Sold the World" by David Bowie as a bonus track.)
- The Best of Rock Star: INXS (2005) (includes her performances of "Heart-Shaped Box by Nirvana, "The Man Who Sold the World" by David Bowie and "Imagine" by John Lennon)

== Videography ==
A DVD titled Rock Star: INXS The DVD was released on November 29, 2005, containing selected performances by the final six contestants (J.D. Fortune, Marty Casey, Mig Ayesa, Suzie McNeil, Jordis Unga, and Ty Taylor) as well as the post-finale mini-concert by INXS & J.D. Fortune, short behind-the-scenes footage, and extras including the contestants' casting interviews and a photo slideshow.

Unga's performances for Rock Star: INXS The DVD were taken from episodes throughout the series:

- Week 1, Episode 2: Jordis Unga – "Heart-Shaped Box" (Nirvana)
- Week 4, Episode 11: – "The Man Who Sold the World"
- Week 8, Episode 23 – "Imagine" (John Lennon)
