= Kitten Forever =

Feminist punk-rock trio from Minneapolis

- Origin: Minneapolis, Minnesota, United States
- Genres: Punk rock, riot grrrl, dance-punk
- Years active: 2006–2022
- Labels: Tardigrade Records, Unnecessary Friction Records, Guilt Ridden Pop, Atlas Chair Records, Rat Queen Records
- Members: Corrie Harrigan; Laura Larson; Liz Elton

Kitten Forever was an American feminist punk trio based in Minneapolis. The all-woman band formed in June 2006 and included Corrie Harrigan, Laura Larson, and Liz Elton. Reviler described them as a trio who "collapse pop melodies underneath fuzzy, broken-speaker bass and chaotic drumming, all held together by glue and safety pins vocals that bring to mind the kinetic energy and art-punk attitude of Karen O."

Kitten Forever released their first album, Born Ready, in 2008. In July 2013, they released their second full-length album, Pressure, which they promoted on their RIDE OR DIE WITCH NO BUMMER SUMMER: NOTHING'S BETTER THAN FRIENDS TOUR. The album was recorded at Ecstattic Studios by Ali Jaafar and included the single "Famous Friends".

On Pressure, Kitten Forever began their signature live show attraction, the ability to switch instruments as well as roles mid-performance and deliver a complex and dynamic show. This approach to performing and songwriting gives the band a unified front, deconstructing traditional stage hierarchy. They also began using a telephone microphone, inspired by the sound of punk band Mika Miko.

On July 18, 2015, Kitten Forever performed before Jack Off Jill during their only US reunion show.

Their third album, 7 Hearts, was released on JD Samson's Atlas Chair Records in 2016. With just 15 tracks, run through in under 30 minutes, 7 Hearts continues the take no s— party vibes that excelled on the band’s second full-length Pressure and elevates them with harder, nuanced messages about feminism and power. 7 Hearts was recorded by Matt Castore and mastered by Sarah Register.

With their fourth full-length release, Semi-Permanent, Kitten Forever returned to their DIY roots, self-releasing the 11-song album on their own label Rat Queen Records in 2018. They toured on this album as support for Screaming Females during their All At Once US tour.

On June 10, 2022, Kitten Forever "crossed the rainbow bridge," announcing on Bandcamp that they are no longer a band.

== Band members ==
- Corrie Harrigan (drums, bass, vocals)
- Laura Larson (drums, bass, vocals)
- Liz Elton (bass, vocals)

Harrigan and Elton both attended the Perpich Center for Arts Education in Golden Valley, Minnesota.

Larson also plays in the band Scrunchies, and formerly in Baby Guts.

== Discography ==
=== EPs ===
- Fat Crush (2007)
- Magical Realism (2009)

=== Studio albums ===
- Born Ready (2008)
- Pressure (2013)
- 7 Hearts (2016)
- Semi-Permanent (2018)
