= Perpich Center for Arts Education =

Art agency in Golden Valley, Minnesota

Coordinates: 44°59′00.3″N 93°21′34.8″W

Perpich Arts High School

Location
- Olson Memorial Highway; Golden Valley, Minnesota; United States

Information
- Established: 1989; 37 years ago
- Grades: 11-12
- Capacity: 310

The Perpich Center for Arts Education is an agency of the state of Minnesota that seeks to advance K-12 education throughout the state by teaching in and through the arts. A 33-acre (130,000 m^{2}) campus in Golden Valley houses the center's three main components: the outreach and professional development group, Perpich Arts High School, and the Perpich Arts Library. Perpich serves as a resource for arts education, students, teachers, artists and arts and youth organizations in Minnesota.

Perpich Arts High School is a tuition-free public high school delivering a comprehensive education centered in the arts. The school is open to all 11th- and 12th-grade students who are Minnesota residents. Students apply and audition in 10th or 11th grade, in one of six areas: dance, literary arts, media arts, music, theater, or visual arts. With enrollment limited to 310 students, the school offers the benefit of learning in a small community while allowing students to take advantage of arts resources in the Twin Cities. Students living in the Twin Cities area usually commute, while those from the greater Minnesota area live in a supervised residence hall on campus.

== History ==
Former Minnesota Governor Rudy Perpich and his wife, Lola Perpich, provided the vision for the creation of the center after an extended stay in Vienna, Austria. Inspired by the seamless integration of arts and academics in Viennese schools, the Perpiches worked to create something similar in Minnesota when Rudy was reelected governor in 1983. After a long debate, the idea of an arts high school was expanded to include professional development in arts education available to all Minnesota teachers and a statewide resource library.

The center was established in legislation in 1985 and was titled the Minnesota School of the Arts and Resource Center. Opening as The Minnesota Center for Arts Education in the autumn of 1989, the school began with junior students who graduated in 1991. The school has graduated nearly 3,500 alumni, many of whom have gone on to top-ranked colleges and conservatories across the country and are leading practitioners in their arts as well as successful doctors, teachers, lawyers, scientists, and community leaders.

The center is on property that belonged to the Golden Valley Lutheran College, and most of its buildings were originally part of that school. All the buildings have been modified to accommodate the Perpich Center's mission. A major addition to the main school building was made in 1998-99.

== Art areas ==
=== Theater ===
Perpich's theater program offers a general introduction to theatrical practice, with a primary focus in acting skills. Students gain a working understanding of the Stanislavsky System, with particular emphasis on ensemble performance and physical expression. The program explores classical and contemporary performance theory and practice, including musical theater. All students in the program are engaged in class and production work throughout the year.

=== Dance ===
Perpich's dance program, directed by Mary Harding, focuses mostly on modern dance, with ballet and jazz training. Students are taught improvisation, dance history, theory, and choreography. Three dance concerts are performed per year along with additional collaborative performances on campus and in the community.

=== Music ===
In the music department students perform in small ensembles. Unlike a typical high-school music program, there is no orchestra or band. There is a choir for the first part of the year. Students form ensembles of two to five members and work collaboratively to arrange or compose music for their voices and instruments. They perform many concerts a year. Students also study a wide range of music topics in seminars, including theory and ear training, several seminars in electronic music, African drumming, guitar techniques and styles, soloing, and recording.

=== Literary arts ===
In their junior year literary arts students start with an intense study and practice of memoir, and then move on to short fiction, eventually creating a research-based, character-driven short story.

In their senior year students focus on work in a variety of genres, with a strong emphasis on poetry.

In both their junior and senior years, students may read selected pieces of their writing in public readings arranged by the school. Literary students are also encouraged to arrange public readings not affiliated with the center.

Several collaborative works have come from the center's literary arts community, including an anthology independently published by the graduating classes of 2006 and 2007: "Lit Kids: Mama Bird and the Electric Rabbit" (Mill City Press, 2007).

=== Media arts ===
The media arts program includes work with digital and traditional photography, computer animation, digital film, film history and criticism, and screenwriting. The department competes annually in national competitions, and students are required to present work in the community and develop a portfolio for review.

=== Visual arts ===
The visual arts department is the school's largest. It comprises a painting and drawing studio, printmaking studio, ceramics room, computer lab, and gallery space.

All juniors are taught painting, drawing, graphic design, printmaking, documentation, portfolio development, and art history.

The senior year is a year of electives. Choices include paper-making, oil painting, advanced drawing, stop-motion animation, ceramics sculpture, digital imaging, grant writing, public art, sculpture, jewelry, monotype printmaking, screen printing, and portfolio development.

== Noted alumni ==
- Natalie Denise Sperl, actress, model and musician
- Sean Tillmann (Har Mar Superstar) (1995), musician and actor
- Jordis Unga (2000), contestant on Star Search, Rock Star: INXS, and The Voice
- Anni Rossi, viola player
- Josette Bynum (1995), professional wrestler, Total Non-Stop Action (TNA)
- Corrie Harrigan and Liz Elton (2005) of Kitten Forever
- Paper Tiger, (hip hop producer)
- Katherine Gerdes (1999), fashion designer, contestant on Project Runway (season 3)
- Jenny Zigrino (2005), comedian and actress
- Samantha Rei (1999), fashion designer, contestant on Project Runway (season 16), author, illustrator
- Nate Towle (2012), guitarist of Satan's Satyrs

== Location ==
The Perpich Center is on Olson Memorial Highway in Golden Valley, Minnesota.
