= Switch (INXS album) =

Studio album by INXS
- Released: 29 November 2005
- Recorded: 2004–2005
- Genre: Funk rock
- Length: 44:04
- Label: Epic
- Producer: Guy Chambers

INXS chronology
INXS: Live at Barker Hangar (2005)	Switch (2005)	Original Sin (2010)

Singles from Switch
- 1. "Pretty Vegas" Released: 4 October 2005; 2. "Afterglow" Released: 25 April 2006; 3. "Devil's Party" Released: 4 May 2006; 4. "Perfect Strangers" Released: 17 June 2006; 5. "God's Top Ten" Released: 3 July 2006

Switch is the eleventh studio album by the Australian rock band INXS, and their last to be composed of entirely new material. It was released on 29 November 2005 and produced by Guy Chambers. It was their first full-length studio album since the 1997 suicide of original vocalist Michael Hutchence, and the only album to feature Canadian singer and new vocalist J.D. Fortune.

The album received mixed critical reviews. The album's songwriting and quality from song to song was found to be inconsistent and varied by critics such as Matt Collar of Allmusic. However, some reviewers also complimented frontman J.D. Fortune's singing as well as the inclusion of guest vocalists such as Suzie McNeil, who had starred with Fortune in the program Rock Star: INXS. The album was also commercially successful, reaching the top 20 in Australia, Canada, New Zealand, and the United States.

== Background ==
INXS co-founder and original lead singer, Michael Hutchence, died on 22 November 1997, reportedly of suicide. The band went through numerous lead singers following Hutchence's death, and performed irregularly, including a showing at the 2000 Summer Olympics closing ceremony alongside Men at Work. INXS were inducted into the ARIA Hall of Fame in 2001, as they faded out of the public spotlight.

In 2005, the remaining members of INXS – Andrew Farriss, Garry Gary Beers, Tim Farriss, Kirk Pengilly, and Jon Farriss – joined forces with Mark Burnett to be the subjects of the first series of Rock Star; Rock Star: INXS. Tim Farriss told Entertainment Weekly "after Michael died, we wanted to search the world for a new singer but didn't know how we could effectively do that ... By having Mark ... embrace the concept, we've now found a fantastic way to make that happen." J.D. Fortune ultimately won the competition, with Tim Farriss declaring the band chose him because of his "slightly dangerous edge" and "star quality".

== History ==
The first single released from Switch was "Pretty Vegas", written by J.D. Fortune and Andrew Farriss. It was released exclusively through iTunes Store on 4 October 2005 for two weeks. Three singles were released from the album in America ("Pretty Vegas", "Afterglow", and "Devil's Party"), with "Pretty Vegas" reaching number 37 on the Billboard Hot 100.

In an interview with guitarist/saxophonist, Kirk Pengilly, the last song in the track listing for Switch, "God's Top Ten" is dedicated to Hutchence and his daughter, Tiger. It paints Michael as a "wild colonial boy, drifting with the stars." "God's Top Ten" was only released as an airplay single in Canada and Poland to promote the album.

The song "Afterglow" is also dedicated to Hutchence.

The album was digitally released through US service providers with different non-album cuts such as "Let's Ride," "Amateur Night," "Easy Easy" and an alternate mix of 'Devil's Party'.

Upon its release INXS were praised for recapturing their old magic, but some critics commented Fortune may have relied too much on Hutchence's signature style of singing rather than adopting his own.

=== 2006 re-issues ===
On 14 April 2006, a DualDisc version of the album was released in Australia. The CD audio side of the disc features the album in full. The DVD side contains all 11 songs in enhanced stereo, "The Making of Switch", a video documentary directed by Matt Skerritt, produced by Gregg Gilmore and Calvin Aurand and the "Pretty Vegas" music video. Then on 4 August 2006, a tour edition was also released in Australia with different cover art and a bonus disc featuring "Pretty Vegas", "Hot Girls", "Hungry", and "Devil's Party" all recorded live in Canada, plus music videos for "Pretty Vegas", "Afterglow", and "Perfect Strangers". "The Making of Switch" video documentary (30 min) was also added.

16 October 2006, saw the release of a UK edition with different cover art and featured extra tracks: "Taste It" (live), "Never Let You Go" (Digital Dog Remix), and "Afterglow" (Redanka's Afterdark Remix); plus the "Afterglow" music video. It was reissued by indie label MX3 (distributed by Universal, like the back catalogue).

== Album and single releases ==
Switch was released on 29 November 2005. In Canada, both the album and the single, Pretty Vegas, went platinum and reached number one on the chart. The album received platinum certification in Dec. 2005 by the Canadian Recording Industry Association (CRIA), and Canadian sales of the album have exceeded 170,000 units. The album went platinum and peaked at number 18 on the ARIA Singles Chart, and spent an up-and-down 30 weeks in the top 50. It also peaked at number nine on the RIANZ Singles Chart, on which it spent 34 weeks.

Switch peaked at number 17 on the Billboard 200, and appeared on the Canadian Hot 100 and Top Internet Albums charts at numbers two and 56, respectively. The album has sold 391,000 copies in the US since release. The single "Pretty Vegas" received gold certification from the Recording Industry Association of America (RIAA) on 26 January 2006.

Total sales of the album are estimated at just below one million.

== World tour ==
The first leg of the Switched On world tour began with sold out dates in Vancouver, B.C. at the Queen Elizabeth Theatre on 18 January 2006, Toronto's Massey Hall on 7 February, and included 20-plus dates through 18 February in Washington.

INXS would eventually tour Canada two more times (coast to coast) before finally wrapping up the tour in late 2007.

== Reception ==
Professional ratings
Review scores
Source	Rating
AllMusic	3/5 stars
BBC	3/5 stars
The Boston Phoenix	1.5/4 stars
Entertainment Weekly	C−
PopMatters	5/10 stars
The Sydney Morning Herald	(negative)
Toronto Sun	3.5/5 stars

AllMusic's Matt Collar rated Switch three stars out of five. He began the review negatively, with the claim "For all intents and purposes, the death of Australian rock band INXS' lead singer, Michael Hutchence, in 1997 ended the band's career." He argued that without Hutchence, there was little point in the band continuing, and criticised their use of Rockstar: INXS, arguing "all the band was looking for was a relatively good-looking, relatively tuneful young man who could evince some cocksure rock smarminess." Describing Hutchence as the best part of the old INXS, Collar argued that Switch could never equal its predecessors, but nonetheless noted some quality work—Fortune's lyrics on "Devil's Party" and "Afterglow" were approved of, though his vocals, Collar argued, could nowhere near match the original. Fortune's role as a "Sex God" was criticised, especially on "the icky and somewhat offensive 'Hot Girls.'" Collar concluded that the band had acknowledged they would never equal their success with Hutchence, and that "one's interest in Switch largely depends on the listener's ability to come to that same conclusion."

BBC's Jez Burr also rated the album three out of five. Burr noted "Devil's Party", stating that the resemblance between Fortune's vocals and Hutchence was uncanny. It thus described INXS as a Hutchence tribute band, and the album as "caught in a timewarp that is 1989."

The Boston Phoenix rated Switch one and a half stars. Reviewer Mikael Wood described the album as "contrived", much like the TV show it came as a result of. Wood attacked the album's lyrics and musical style, claiming it contained "clumsy pre-fab grooves about hot girls and perfect strangers and how it ain’t pretty when the pretty leaves you. No joke, guys."

Entertainment Weekly gave the album a C−. Reviewer David Browne said that INXS occasionally resembled their old selves—"churning out riffy half-songs just as they always did." This, he said, was preferable to the "strip-joint sleaze" that composed the rest of the album, which he summarised as secondhand.

Mike Schiller of PopMatters agreed and gave Switch a score of five out of ten. Schiller again criticised the workings of Rockstar: INXS, noting aspects of favouritism, of the loss of Hutchence being too great, and of the "questionable popularity of INXS." He argued that Switch did not resemble an INXS album; rather, he said it sounded like "Rock Star INXS: The Album" – "rushed, undercooked, and a bit uncomfortable." Schiller, like Collar, praised "Devil's Party", as well as "Pretty Vegas" – he pointed out that Fortune sounded best on the songs he helped write. Meanwhile, the collaborative songwriting was criticised, with Schiller arguing that Guy Chambers "just doesn't quite know how to fit his songwriting style into the INXS template." He also pointed out that Rockstar INXS runner-up Suzie McNeil's performance on closing track "God's Top Ten" showed " a strong performance here that outshines Fortune's." Overall, he argued, Switch did not seem like an album by a well-versed band, but a solo artist hiring some extra musicians.

The Sydney Morning Herald's Bernard Zuel reviewed the album negatively, stating that the album more resembled the work of a cover band than Hutchence-era INXS. He argued that the majority of songs on the album were near replicas of earlier INXS songs, stating "you can hear 1985's Listen Like Thieves all through several songs." Zuel pointed out that Farriss' songwriting was still good, but that overall the album was "pretty much what you would have expected to hear from INXS in 1998, or 1988 for that matter."

Jane Stevenson of Toronto Sun said Switch "raises as many questions as it answers" about INXS's future, in a three-and-a-half out of five stars review. She echoed Zuel's comments that the album sounded like INXS were "stuck in the '80s." Despite this, the review noted that the album could have been a good deal worse—Farriss' collaborations with Chambers and Child were praised, described as slick and well-polished.

== Track listing ==
Switch track listing
No.	Title	Writer(s)	Length
1.	"Devil's Party"	Andrew Farriss, J.D. Fortune	3:25
2.	"Pretty Vegas"	A. Farriss, Fortune, Marty Casey, Jordis Unga	3:25
3.	"Afterglow"	A. Farriss, Desmond Child	4:08
4.	"Hot Girls"	A. Farriss, Guy Chambers, The Matrix	3:30
5.	"Perfect Strangers"	Garry Gary Beers, Tony Bruno, The Matrix, Shelly Peiken	4:12
6.	"Remember Who's Your Man"	A. Farriss, Gregg Alexander, Annie Roboff	3:28
7.	"Hungry"	A. Farriss	4:47
8.	"Never Let You Go"	Jon Farriss, Fortune	4:18
9.	"Like It or Not"	Kirk Pengilly, Hughie Murray	3:44
10.	"Us"	A. Farriss, Chambers	4:07
11.	"God's Top Ten"	A. Farriss	4:54

== Personnel ==
Personnel as listed in the album's liner notes are:

INXS

- J.D. Fortune – vocals
- Andrew Farriss – keyboards, guitars, horn arrangements
- Tim Farriss – guitars
- Kirk Pengilly – guitars, saxophone, vocals, horn arrangements
- Garry Gary Beers – bass, vocals
- Jon Farriss – drums, percussion, vocals

Additional musicians

- Guy Chambers – keyboards, guitars, orchestra arrangements
- Paul Mirkovich – acoustic piano, backing vocals
- Richard Flack – programming
- Paul Stanborough – guitars
- Dan Higgins – baritone saxophone, tenor saxophone, flute
- Andrew Martin – trombone
- Wayne Bergeron – trumpets, flugelhorn
- Suzie McNeil – backing vocals, lead vocals (11)
- Deanna Johnston – backing vocals
- Ann Lewis – backing vocals
- Lisbeth Scott – backing vocals

Production

- Guy Chambers – producer
- Richard Flack – additional production, recording, mixing (1, 3, 5–8, 10, 11)
- Tim Palmer – mixing (2, 9)
- Paul Stanborough – additional engineer, digital editing
- Todd Parker – additional digital editing
- Zack Horne – assistant engineer
- Steve Jones – assistant engineer
- Assen Stoyanov – assistant engineer, mix assistant
- Tracy Walker – assistant engineer
- John Hanes – mix assistant
- Tim Roberts – mix assistant
- Jamie Seyberth – mix assistant
- Doug Sax – mastering
- Dylan Chambers – record coordinator
- Brandy Flower – art direction, design
- Sheryl Nields – photography
- Scott Duncan – back cover photography
- Lynne Bugai – stylist

Studios

- Recorded at Westlake Studios (Los Angeles, California)
- Mixed at Westlake Studios; Paramount Recording Studios (Hollywood, California); MixStar Studios (Virginia Beach, Virginia); Sphere Studios (London, UK)
- Mastered at The Mastering Lab (Hollywood, California)

== Charts and certifications ==
=== Weekly charts ===
Weekly chart performance for Switch
Chart (2005–2006)	Peak position
Australian Albums (ARIA)	18
Canadian Albums (Billboard)	2
New Zealand Albums (RMNZ)	7
US Billboard 200	17

=== Year-end charts ===
Year-end chart performance for Switch
Chart (2006)	Position
Australian Albums (ARIA)	54
US Billboard 200	198

== Sales and certifications ==
Sales and certifications for Switch
Region	Certification	Certified units/sales
Australia (ARIA)	Platinum	70,000^{^}
Canada (Music Canada)	Platinum	100,000^{^}
New Zealand (RMNZ)	2× Platinum	30,000^{^}
United States (RIAA)	—	391,000
^{^} Shipments figures based on certification alone.
