= Lovehammers =

American rock band

- Origin: Chicago, Illinois, U.S.
- Genres: Alternative rock; indie rock; post-grunge; pop-punk
- Years active: 1994–present
- Labels: Epic; Reep
- Members: Marty Casey; Dino Kourelis; Bob Kourelis; Billy Sawilchik
- Past members: Ben Kelly; John Murdoch
- Website: lovehammers.com

Lovehammers is an American alternative rock band based in Chicago. Their sound is best described as a combination of pop-punk with grunge influences.

Since 1997, Lovehammers have independently released six full-length albums, several EPs, and one major label LP. Originally they performed under the moniker "Swinging Lovehammers", then for their self-titled major label debut (released January 2006), they were known as Marty Casey & Lovehammers. Currently they are going by "Lovehammers". They have also appeared live on VH1, playing acoustic versions of their songs: "Trees", "The Tunnel", and "The Riddle".

== History ==
=== Beginnings ===
Lovehammers band members Marty Casey, Bobby Kourelis, and his younger brother Dino Kourelis became friends in 1982 when the three were on the same Little League T-Ball team in their hometown of Hickory Hills, Illinois. As young teens they formed a cover band with neighborhood friends Ben Kelly on guitar and John Murdoch as lead vocalist. They called themselves "Swinging Lovehammers". After entering college, John Murdoch left the band and Marty Casey took over as vocalist.

In 1994, they discovered Billy Sawilchik, who was playing lead guitar for a band called 9 Arms. In May 1994 they officially recruited him to become a member of Swinging Lovehammers. With this line-up in place the band began writing original material.

In 1997, Swinging Lovehammers released their first full-length album, Ultrasound. It featured an early incarnation of the band's, now signature, genre melding "un-pretentious rock" sound.

In 1999, the band released Demolition, a four-song EP recorded at DV Productions in Milwaukee, Wisconsin. Demolition features the songs "Real Man", "Give It Up", "Counterfeit", and "Confusion". These songs were later re-released on the Lovehammers second LP L'Strange. The song "Rain on the Brain" was awarded a place in the John Lennon Songwriting Contest that same year.

By the year 2000, Swinging Lovehammers began to acquire a larger fanbase throughout the Midwest, winning various Battle of the Bands competitions and booking gigs at notable venues and festivals such as House of Blues, Summerfest and Lincoln's Fest. They also began receiving local radio play.

=== Name change and Ben Kelly's departure ===
Around 2000, Swinging Lovehammers' fanbase swelled and their devotees became known as 'Hammerheads.' On September 30, 2000, Swinging Lovehammers released the original version of their second album, "L'strange". By October, Mötley Crüe's Nikki Sixx reviews the band favorably, calling them "another new band to keep your eyes open for." On March 24, 2001, Swinging Lovehammers released their second EP "How We Live". It was produced by legendary indie rock impresario Steve Albini, known for his work with Nirvana, PJ Harvey and Pixies. On August 8, 2001, the band officially changed its name from Swinging Lovehammers to the simpler Lovehammers. Bass player Dino Kourelis explained the change on the band's official website: "You can call us whatever you want. Most people call us Lovehammers anyway. We will keep all names to make everyone happy. We made a little change for marketing reasons, as well as 'change is good.'" On November 6, 2001, Lovehammers re-released L'Strange complete with new cover art which reflects the name change.

In late 2003, Ben Kelly officially left the band. Marty Casey explained the departure in an informal message posted to the website: "He [Ben] was a part of this band for a long time. I can't honestly sit here and say I do not miss him.... There are only 24 hours in a day and Ben was operating on a 48 hour schedule. We wanted to put every single moment of energy into our next CD. This is what I have been building up to for my entire life. I wanted to put every moment of my life into creating the best Lovehammer CD anyone has ever heard. This requires singular focus from every person involved in the record." Billy Sawilchik became and remains the band's only lead guitarist.

On July 27, 2003, Lovehammers released their third full-length album entitled Murder on My Mind. The album featured a number of songs written by Marty Casey during his stay in New York City, including "Wait For No One",' "Better Off (Walk Away)", and "Eyes Can't See", which form a thematic trilogy.

=== Rockstar:INXS and major label debut ===
In 2005, Lovehammers were opening for Cake and Gomez on the 21 city Virgin College Mega Tour. At that time, Marty Casey was participating in ongoing auditions for the reality television show Rockstar: INXS (which aired on CBS and VH1. The show's premise was a televised singing competition between 15 contestants competing to become the lead vocalist for the Australian rock band INXS. Casey made it onto the show and quickly became a fan favorite. Despite the remaining band-members' initial apprehension, they supported Casey and could occasionally be seen in the crowd cheering him on during his performances. On September 6, 2005, Marty Casey debuted a different version of the pop-heavy Lovehammers song "Trees", which had been previously available for download on the Lovehammers website. It became an instant hit with the audience and debuted on MSN.com as a #1 download. When Marty was announced runner up, losing to Canadian singer J.D. Fortune, the Lovehammers were immediately offered a contract with Epic records and a spot as the opening band on INXS's Switched On tour.

During mid-2006, Lovehammers headlined the 'Get Live' tour. Most of the dates were quickly sold out, and the reviews were overwhelmingly favorable.

On January 24, 2006, Lovehammers released their major label debut entitled Marty Casey & Lovehammers, composed mostly of retooled versions of previously released and recorded Lovehammers tracks. The album was generally very well received by critics and fans alike.

=== Recent events: 2007–present ===
In 2007, Lovehammers recorded a live acoustic compilation CD/DVD produced by Stonecutter Records entitled Acoustic Chicago, which features unplugged tracks from various Chicago based bands. They are also in the process of writing and recording their next major-label LP. They have also organized a charity campaign called 'Shoeboxes @ Home,' which helps provide necessities for both men and women serving overseas in the military as well as military veterans in need residing in the United States.

In 2009, Lovehammers released a new album titled Heavy Crown. The album was previously set to be called 'Let Me Out,' but was later changed to Heavy Crown. The album offered a refreshing respite from today's over-compartmentalized musical climate with a different sound from previous albums. The Lovehammers challenged themselves with the writing process and sought a combination of both light and dark.

During 2009–2010 Lovehammers did some touring and released a single from Heavy Crown: "Guns". Lovehammers had decent success with "Guns", reaching #51 on Billboard's Active Rock charts. Rather than releasing another single, the band decided to take a break from touring to concentrate on song writing and building their own studio. The seeds had been planted for "Set Fire" which would be released a couple years later. Lovehammers continued to play select festivals including Summerfest, as well as the band-created Hammerfest and Hammer Cruise. In June 2009, they played a free concert at the Taste of Chicago with Wallflowers and select support slots such as Kiss, Thin Lizzy, and Slash.

In preparation for their seventh album, titled "Set Fire", band members Marty Casey, Bob Kourelis, Dino Kourelis, and Billy Sawilchik took a non-traditional approach to music-making and started their own recording studio: REEP. Without the normal rush or cost of studio time, the Lovehammers were able to write and record at their own pace, allowing the creation of more music as songs evolved organically. The finished material was given to mixer Anthony Focx from Nashville (Aerosmith, Steven Tyler, Metallica, Sick Puppies, Mötley Crüe, etc.) for completion. Having built and engineered their own studio to avoid outside pressures and timelines, "Set Fire" is the hardest hitting album the Lovehammers have ever delivered. No lyric toned down, no guitar solo removed due to radio time constraints…together band members worked incessantly for 18 months to create a collection of songs that would blow their own minds.

In November 2012, Lovehammers released "Set Fire" through their record label REEP in conjunction with Fontana/INgrooves. Currently, "Set Fire" broke into 3 Billboard charts, including Billboard New Artists - #13, Billboard Heatseekers - #13 and Billboard East North Central Heatseekers Regional - #1.

In 2013, Lovehammers released the first single from "Set Fire:" "Into the Insane". It received moderate success on the Active and Modern Rock charts. "Into the Insane" reached #51 on Active Rock, and peaked at #42 on Modern Rock. Due to the success of "Set Fire" and its first single, Lovehammers decided to release a second single to Active, Modern, and Alternative Rock. They announced that this single will be "Price I Pay". Lovehammers went back into the studio with legendary rock producer Johnny K to re-record guitars, some vocals, and to re-mix "Price I Pay" for radio.

== Members ==
Current members

- Marty Casey – lead vocals, guitar, songwriter (1994–present)
- Dino Kourelis – bass (1994–present)
- Bob Kourelis – drums (1994–present)
- Billy Sawilchik – lead guitar, backing vocals (1994–present)

Former members

- Ben Kelley – lead guitar (1994–2003)
- John Murdoch – lead vocals (1994)

== Discography ==
=== Studio albums ===
Title	Album details	Peak positions
Title	Album details	US
Ultrasound	Release date: 1997; Label: REEP Records	—
L'Strange	Release date: 2002; Label: REEP Records	—
Murder on My Mind	Release date: 2003; Label: Swinging Lovehammers Records	—
Marty Casey and Lovehammers	Release date: 2006; Label: Epic Records	67
Heavy Crown	Release date: 2009; Label: REEP Records/Fontana Distribution/Ingrooves	—
Set Fire	Release date: 2012; Label: REEP Records/Fontana Distribution/Ingrooves	—
"—" denotes releases that did not chart

=== Singles and EPs ===
Year	Title	Label
1999	Demolition EP	REEP Records
2001	How We Live EP	Swinging Lovehammers Records
2006	Trees	Epic/Sony/REEP Records
2006	Merry Christmas (All Year Long)	Swinging Lovehammers Records
2009	Guns	Reep/Fontana/INgrooves
2012	Into the Insane	REEP/Fontana/INgrooves
2013	Price I Pay	REEP/TAC/INgrooves
2014	Black Angel	Lovehammers Records

=== DVDs ===
Year	Title	
2004	Live/Raw	Swinging Lovehammers Inc.
2006	And The Rest Is History...	Swinging Lovehammers Inc.

=== Music videos ===
Year	Title	Director
2006	"Merry Christmas (All Year Long)"	Kyle Ervin
2008	"Sleeper"	Stock Yard Film
2013	"Price I Pay"	Lester Cohn / puredDV
