= Golden Valley Lutheran College =

Coordinates: 44.983682°N 93.358845°W

Golden Valley Lutheran College was founded as the Lutheran Bible Institute. The LBI was a two-year degree-granting Lutheran educational institution established in 1919 in Saint Paul, Minnesota. It moved to Minneapolis in 1929 and then to Golden Valley, Minnesota in 1961. It opened Lutheran Bible Institute of Seattle in 1944, which would become Trinity Lutheran College, a four-year degree-granting institution.

Former Minnesota Timberwolves, Detroit Pistons, and Washington Wizards head coach Flip Saunders began his basketball coaching career here in 1977 and never lost a home game as coach, going 56–0. Former pro wrestler (and now evangelist) Nikita Koloff played football at the college. Pro wrestler Road Warrior Animal also played football here.

In 1967 the school was changed into a two-year junior college and renamed Golden Valley Lutheran College. The school closed in 1985. Most of the campus is intact and is used as the Perpich Center for Arts Education, a public high school.
