= Lior Goldenberg =

Israeli music producer

- ליאור גולדנברג
- Born: September 28, 1974 (age 50); Tel Aviv, Israel
- Occupation: Producer

Lior Goldenberg (Hebrew: ליאור גולדנברג; born September 28, 1974) is a producer and mixer from Tel Aviv, Israel. He currently resides in Los Angeles, California. He has worked with Rancid, Macy Gray, Sheryl Crow, MxPx, Vanessa Carlton, Marilyn Manson, Andrew W.K., Crosby, Stills, Nash & Young, Alanis Morissette, Ziggy Marley, and indie bands Allen Stone, Crash Kings, Saint Motel and Wil Seabrook. He works out of his private studio in Woodland Hills.

On October 4, 2011 Allen Stone released a self-titled album that was produced by Lior. In an interview Allen described the experience of working with Lior as "a dream come true."
