= Mig Ayesa =

Australian vocalist

MiG Ayesa
- Born: Miguel Alfonso Ramon Legarda Ayesa; 12 January 1970 (age 56); Manila, Philippines
- Genres: Rock, pop
- Instruments: Vocals, piano
- Years active: 1999–present
- Label: Decca Records (2005–present)
- Website: www.mig-music.com

Miguel Alfonso Ramon Legarda "MiG" Ayesa (born 12 January 1970) is a Filipino-Australian singer and actor who was a finalist in the reality television show RockStar: INXS as well as appearing in stage productions of We Will Rock You (London); Thriller Live and Bridges of Madison County (Manila).

== Life and career ==
Ayesa was born in Manila, Philippines and raised in Sydney. Ayesa was studying communications at Macquarie University in Sydney when he was offered the role of Ritchie Valens in the theatre production of Buddy: The Buddy Holly Story. He decided to put his studies on hold and went on tour with the production all across Australia. He has since performed in theatres, commercials, television series and film. He has also been a part of several bands: Randy Badass and the Slickmaster Five, Lovetown, The Honkies and The Riva Band.

=== Theatre ===
Ayesa moved from Sydney to London in 2001 to look for a publishing company for his material. He appeared in Rent by Jonathan Larson in London's West End in 2002 playing the role of Angel at The Prince of Wales Theatre. Ayesa played the character of Galileo Figaro in the musical We Will Rock You, which is based entirely on Queen material. In the final months of 2007, Ayesa returned to the stage as Galileo Figaro in the International Tour of We Will Rock You, successfully completing runs in New Zealand, Korea, Singapore, Hong Kong and finishing in Bangkok with his debut CD being released in those respective countries.

Ayesa appeared in Handel's Messiah Rocks in 2008, which was released on CD/DVD fall of 2009, as well as airing as a PBS-TV special across the USA.

In January 2010, Ayesa made his Broadway debut in Jason Gilkison's ballroom dancing revue Burn the Floor. He toured with the show to Australia, Japan, Korea, Canada, and the U.S. In September 2010, Ayesa opened the first national tour of Rock of Ages, in the role of rocker Stacee Jaxx. In March 2011, he returned to Broadway and as Stacee Jaxx for the show's reopening at the Helen Hayes Theatre.

Ayesa returned to London to reprise his role in Thriller Live in January 2012. In May of that year, he reprised the role of Stacee Jaxx in a completely sold out new production of Rock of Ages in the Philippines.

In February 2013, Ayesa reprised the role of Galileo Figaro for the 2013 We Will Rock You 10th Anniversary World Arena Tour, successfully completing runs in Finland, Denmark, the UK, Ireland, Netherlands, Luxembourg, Czech Republic, Turkey, Bulgaria, and Croatia. In June, he returned to the Philippines for Rock of Ages, again as Stacee Jaxx, and also for a third season in October 2014.

Ayesa performed The Music of Queen - Rock and Symphonic Spectacular in Sydney and Perth with fellow former We Will Rock You cast members Michael Falzon, Amanda Harrison and Carly Thomas-Smith. The concert series began on 7 February 2014 followed by two performances on 8 February at Sydney Opera House, before three performances in Perth, Western Australia (Joondalup Resort, Riverside Theatre and Boardwalk Theatre) with the Perth Symphony Orchestra. All three of the Opera House performances sold out and the Perth shows were at capacity, including an 8000-person event for the City of Joondalup at the Joondalup Resort. In June, Ayesa returned to New Zealand to play Rooster in Annie. He returned to the West End in November for Thriller Live, which then toured Australia and New Zealand.

In November 2015, Ayesa returned to the Philippines to star as Robert Kincaid in the first international production of The Bridges of Madison County. The production also starred Joanna Ampil and ran from 20 November till 6 December. It was the first production of the musical outside the US.

In 2018, Ayesa starred in the Philippine-Australian jukebox musical All Out of Love: The Musical, which is based on the songs of Air Supply.

=== Television and film ===
Ayesa is also known for working in the role of the money-grubbing landlord Joe, in the kids television show The Ferals on the ABC. He also had a small part in the film Queen of the Damned as a vampire who was out to kill Lestat for spreading vampire secrets.

Ayesa was also a competitor of the CBS television series Rock Star: INXS to be the new lead singer of INXS and was one of the final three contestants along with runner-up Marty Casey and winner J. D. Fortune. While Ayesa got off to a shaky start with his version of Nirvana's "Smells Like Teen Spirit", he quickly recovered and became a front runner with versions of "Live and Let Die" and "Baby, I Love Your Way", receiving third place in the worldwide competition.

In November 2014, Ayesa announced the launch of his new TV travel reality show Fil It Up. Co-hosted with Sophie Sumner, it aired in January 2015. In conjunction with this, Ayesa released the new video for United As One.

== Discography ==
Ayesa's major label debut, the self-titled album MiG, was released on Decca on 10 April 2007. The CD is a collection of classic and contemporary rock and roll staples, showcasing Ayesa's interpretations of his favourite songs. Brian May from the band Queen took an interest in his work and they worked on a collaboration with his band MiGnition.

During his time with Rock Star: INXS, "Baby, I Love Your Way", with Peter Frampton on acoustic guitar, was released on 22 August 2006 to Yahoo Music, and 29 August to other internet music sites. Exclusive to the US and Canadian release are three original songs, written by Ayesa and Matthew Wilder: "She Loved", "Could It Be" and "You and I". He was signed by Decca/Universal Music Group and his self-titled debut CD was released in the US, Canada, Australia, Philippines and New Zealand in 2007.

August 2011, he released his second album, More Than Ever.

Date	Title	Label	Chart
Albums
2007	MiG	Decca Records	–
2007	MiG (US version)	Decca Records	–
