= Wil Seabrook =

American singer-songwriter

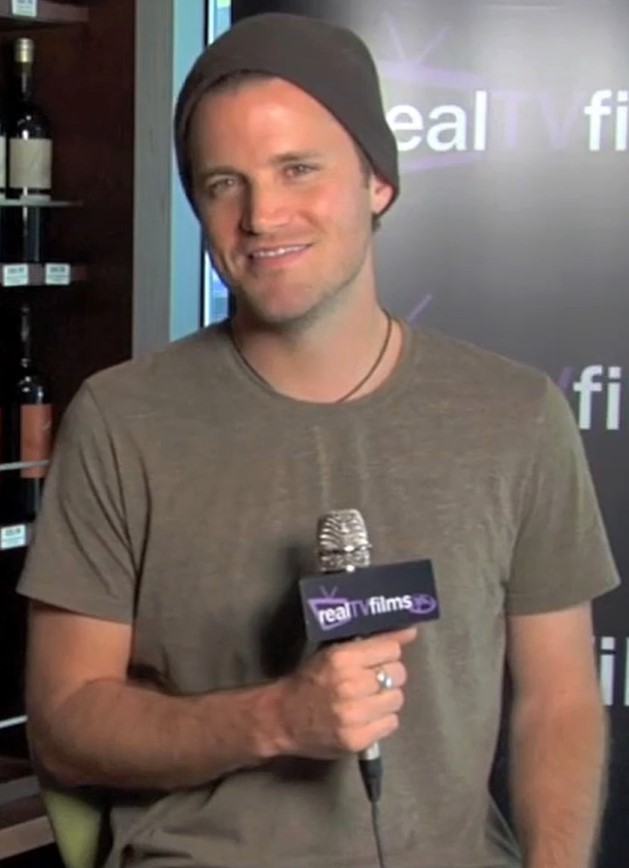
- Seabrook interviewed in 2011

Background information
- Born: October 25, 1976 (age 48)
- Origin: Morganton, North Carolina
- Occupations: Musician
- Website: wilseabrook.com

Wil Seabrook (born October 25, 1976) is a musician, singer, and songwriter from Morganton, North Carolina. He currently resides in Los Angeles, California.

== Career ==
Wil Seabrook released his self-titled debut album in August, 2000. Its first single "You Do What You Have To" was named Record of the Week by BBC Radio 2. After his band, The Wil Seabrook Band, toured with Dave Matthews Band, Sister Hazel and Dishwalla, he ventured out again as a solo artist and released New EP in 2005.

Also in 2005, Wil appeared in the first season of Rock Star INXS. He performed two songs in the regular competition, Heroes and Right Here, Right Now. After his performance of Right Here Right Now was ranked in the bottom three, Seabrook became the second contestant to be eliminated from the show (July 13, 2005). For his elimination performance, Seabrook sang Need You Tonight.

Wil then signed with Mercy Records and began to record his second studio album One Dozen Summers in November 2006. Shortly thereafter, in January 2007, he toured to promote the album in anticipation of its release on August 14, 2007.

In early 2009, Wil was commissioned to write a song for The Elizabeth Glaser Pediatric AIDS Foundation titled "Tomorrow Will Come." Lior Goldenberg produced and mixed the track. All proceeds from the sale of the track go directly to the Foundation. That same year, Wil signed on with ATN Management and performed the song "Inside" in the movie The six wives of Henrey Lefay.

== Scientology ==
Wil Seabrook practices and endorses Scientology. In 2011 he founded Rock For Human Rights, a group supported by the Church of Scientology and affiliated with Youth for Human Rights International and Citizens Commission on Human Rights. The group has toured America, Europe and Asia with a general human rights-focused message ("Freedom of Expression," "The Right to Public Assembly," "The Right to Democracy," etc.) aimed at school-age children; their 2017 single, "Candle," features singer Alexio Kawara of Zimbabwe. In addition to his human rights advocacy, Wil has written blogs promoting religious freedom for STAND League.

== Discography ==
=== The Wil Seabrook Band ===
1. 2002 - The Wil Seabrook Band (EP)
2. 2003 - It's Your Life and They're Living It for You (Maverick, never released)

=== Wil Seabrook ===
1. 2000 - Wil Seabrook
2. 2005 - New (EP)
3. 2007 - One Dozen Summers
4. 2008 - How You Fall (EP)
5. 2009 - Exit to Temple Street
