= Lynne Osterman =

American politician and project manager

Lynne Osterman (born December 12, 1962) is an American politician and project manager.

Born in Golden Valley, Minnesota, Osterman received her bachelor's degree in communications from St. Cloud State University. Osterman is a consultant, serving primarily nonprofit organizations. She lives in New Hope, Minnesota. Osterman has remained somewhat involved in politics throughout her adult life, weighing in on issues as a registered lobbyist on behalf of her clients, having served in the Minnesota House of Representatives in 2003 and 2004 as a Republican.
