= Golden Valley, Minnesota =

City in Minnesota, United States

- City
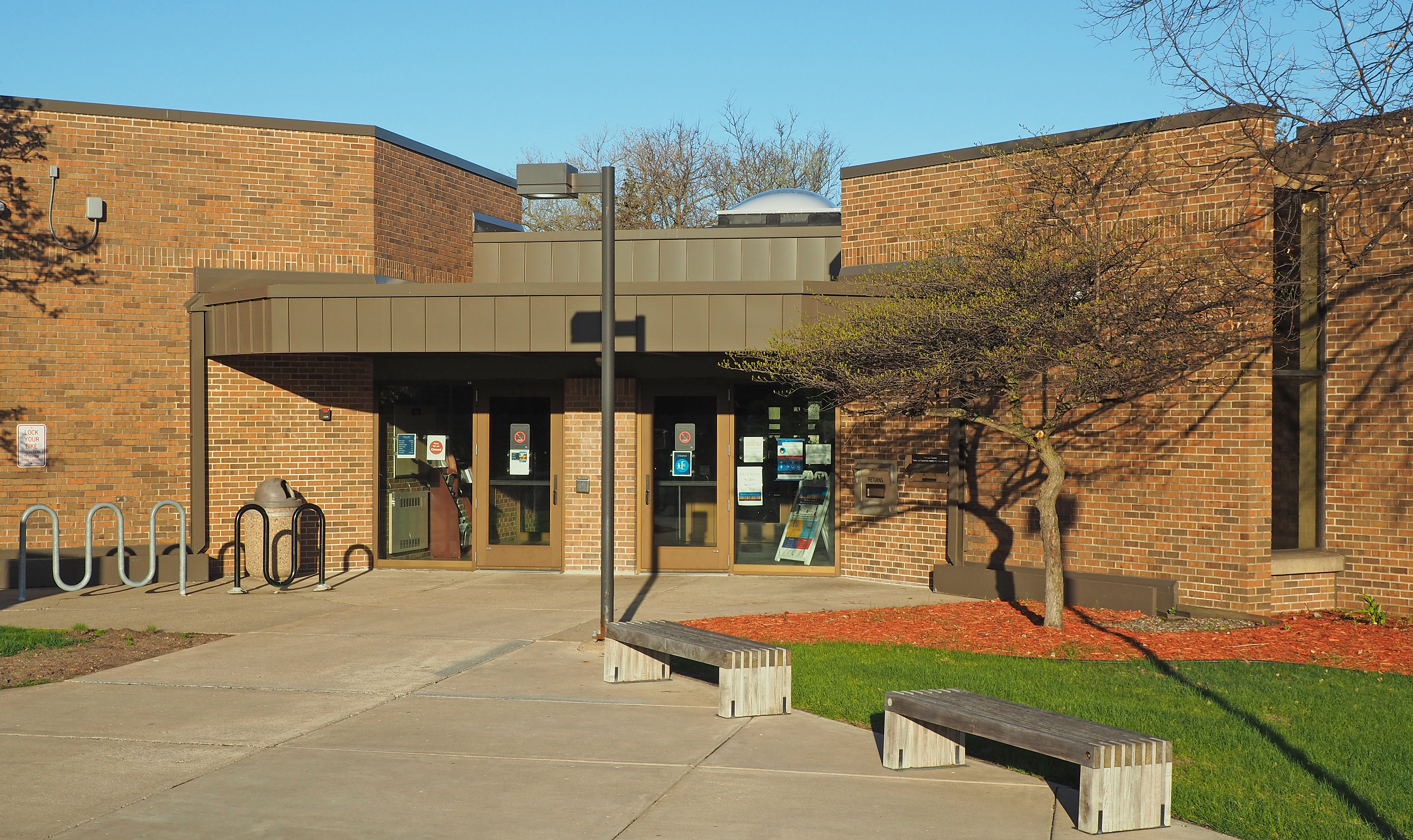
- Golden Valley Library

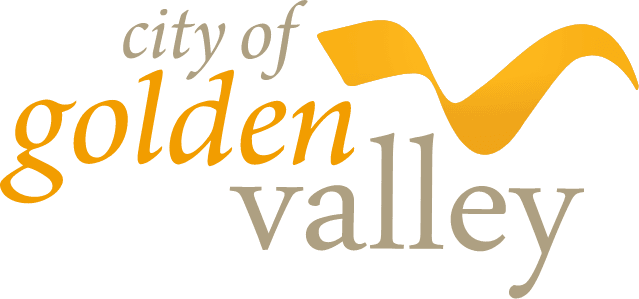
- Logo

- Location of Golden Valley, Minnesota
- Coordinates: 44.990233°N 93.358736°W
- Country: United States
- State: Minnesota
- County: Hennepin
- Founded: 1886
- Incorporated: December 17, 1886

Government
  - Type: Council–manager
  - Mayor: Roslyn Harmon
  - City manager: Noah Schuchman
  - Councilmembers: Sophia Ginis; Maurice Harris; Denise La Mere-Anderson; Gillian Rosenquist

Area
  - Total: 10.544 sq mi (27.309 km^{2})
  - Land: 10.204 sq mi (26.427 km^{2})
  - Water: 0.340 sq mi (0.880 km^{2}) 3.22%
- Elevation: 856 ft (261 m)

Population (2020)
  - Total: 22,552
  - Estimate (2024): 21,263
  - Density: 2,084/sq mi (804.6/km^{2})
- Time zone: UTC–6 (Central (CST))
  - Summer (DST): UTC–5 (CDT)
- ZIP Codes: 55416, 55422, 55426, 55427
- Area code: 763
- FIPS code: 27-24308
- GNIS feature ID: 0644201
- Sales tax: 9.775%
- Website: goldenvalleymn.gov

Golden Valley is a western first-ring suburb of Minneapolis in Hennepin County, Minnesota, United States. Its population was 22,552 at the 2020 census, and was estimated to be 21,263 in 2024. The city is mostly residential and is bordered by Interstate 394. Over 15% of it is parks or nature reserves. Minnesota State Highway 55 runs through the city, providing a direct route to downtown Minneapolis.

Golden Valley is the main corporate headquarters of General Mills, a major flour-milling and food-products company originally located in Minneapolis. It is the site of Pentair's U.S. headquarters and local NBC affiliate KARE. The city was also home to the former Minneapolis-Honeywell headquarters, which is now the Resideo Technologies corporate offices.

== History ==
Golden Valley is located on the ancestral lands of the Dakota people. The first white settlers arrived in the early 1850s. Golden Valley was incorporated on December 17, 1886. In the early 20th century, it was mostly a farming community.

== Geography ==
According to the United States Census Bureau, the city has a total area of 10.544 square miles (27.31 km^{2}), of which 0.340 sq mi (0.88 km^{2}) (0.03% or 218 ac) is covered by water. The 45th parallel north runs through Golden Valley, coinciding roughly with Duluth Street.

Interstate 394, U.S. Highway 169, and Minnesota State Highways 55 and 100 are four of the main routes in the area.

== Education ==
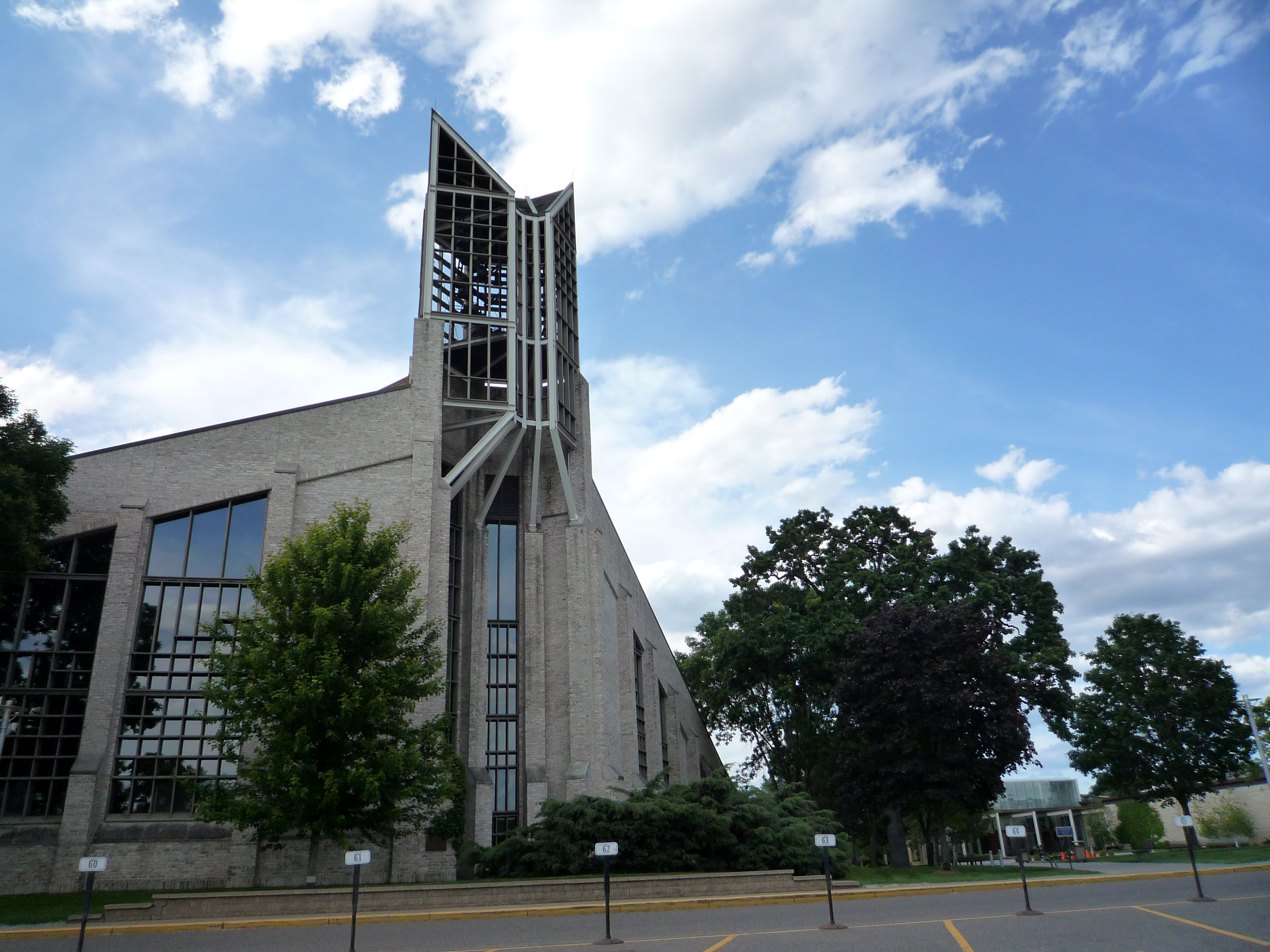
The chapel at Breck School, a private Episcopal school in Golden Valley

Most children who live in Golden Valley attend school in the Robbinsdale School District ISD #281 or the Hopkins School District ISD #270, as all of the city's territory belongs to one or the other. Some students attend public schools in other districts chosen by their families under Minnesota's open-enrollment statute.

Golden Valley High School was founded in 1957, and the adjacent Golden Valley Middle School opened in 1964. Both closed in the early 1980s after the Golden Valley School District merged with the Hopkins School District. Carl Sandburg Junior High School opened in 1959. In 1988, it became Sandburg Middle School. In 1981, the Breck School, a private Episcopal school, purchased the former Golden Valley High School and Middle School property and moved from Minneapolis to the campus of the former Golden Valley schools.

King of Grace Lutheran School is a Christian preschool, elementary school, and middle school of the Evangelical Lutheran Synod in Golden Valley.

Also, a private elementary Catholic School named Good Shepherd Catholic School changed its name in 2006 from Parkvalley Catholic.

What is now the site of the Perpich Center for Arts Education was originally Golden Valley Lutheran College, which closed in May 1985.

== Economy ==
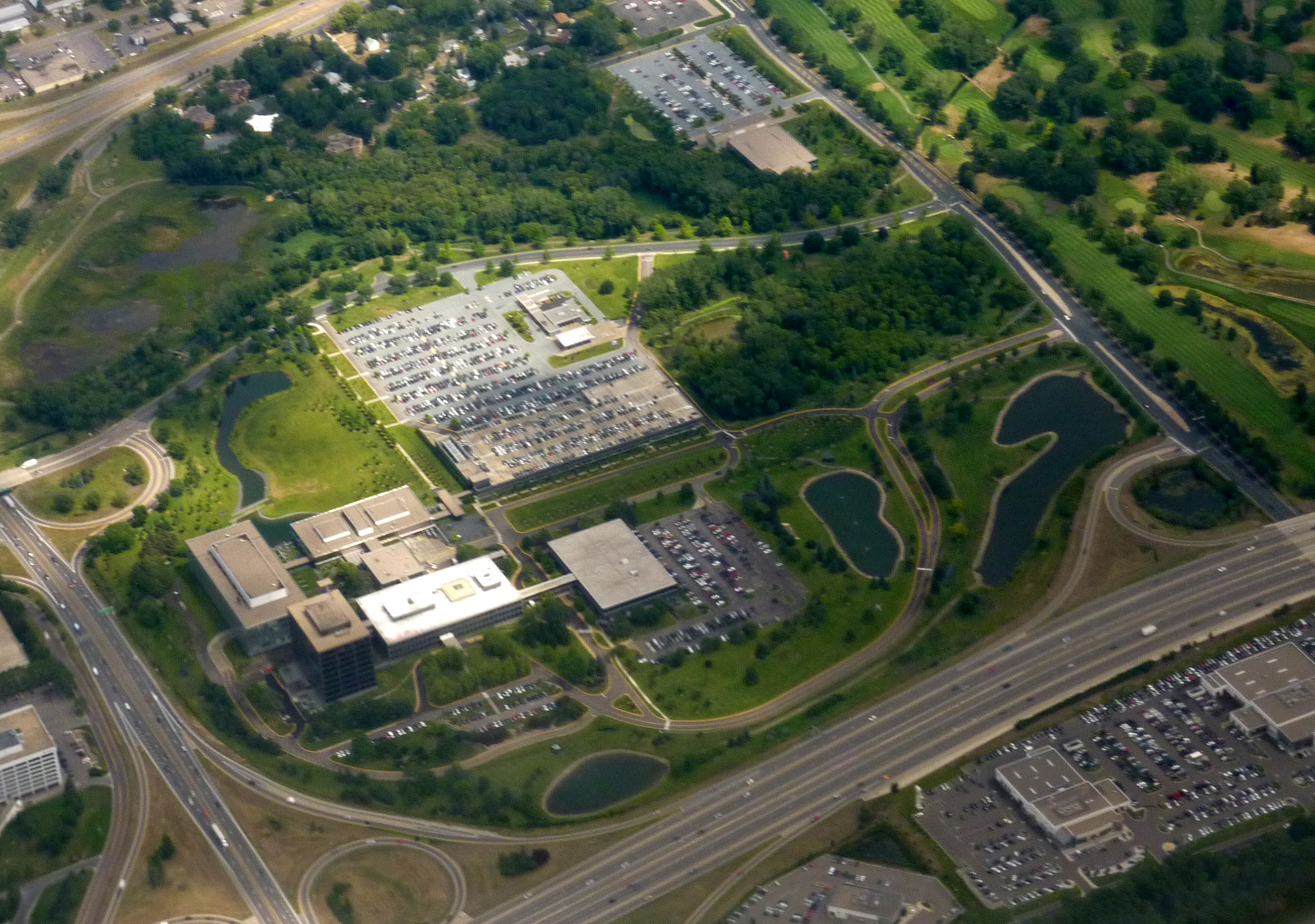
General Mills' corporate campus in Golden Valley

Major employers in the city include:

- General Mills
- UnitedHealth Group
- Honeywell
- Tennant
- Pentair
- KARE, NBC television affiliate for the Twin Cities
- Minnesota United FC – headquarters for the Major League Soccer franchise
- Bluestone Garden
- USFamily.net

Golden Valley's population is around 22,000, but more than 30,000 people work there, because of the presence of large employers, including General Mills, Honeywell, and Pentair.

=== Top employers ===
According to the City's 2023 Annual Comprehensive Financial Report, the largest employers in the city are:

Number	Employer	Type of business	Number of employees	Percentage
1	General Mills, Inc.	Multinational food manufacturer and marketer	3,100	9.0%
2	Allianz Life Insurance Company	Insurance	2,000	5.8%
3	Honeywell Incorporated	Manufacturing	2,000	5.8%
4	Lubrication Technologies	Industrial lubrication solutions	750	2.2%
5	M.A. Mortenson Company	Construction contractor	575	1.7%
6	G.H. Tennant Company	Cleaning products	466	1.4%
7	Courage Center	Nonprofit rehabilitation facility	400	1.2%
8	Preferred One	Life and health insurance	300	0.9%
9	Marsh & McLennan Agency	Insurance brokerage and risk management	300	0.9%
10	Breck School	Education	250	0.7%
—	Total employees	—	10,141	29.5%

== Demographics ==
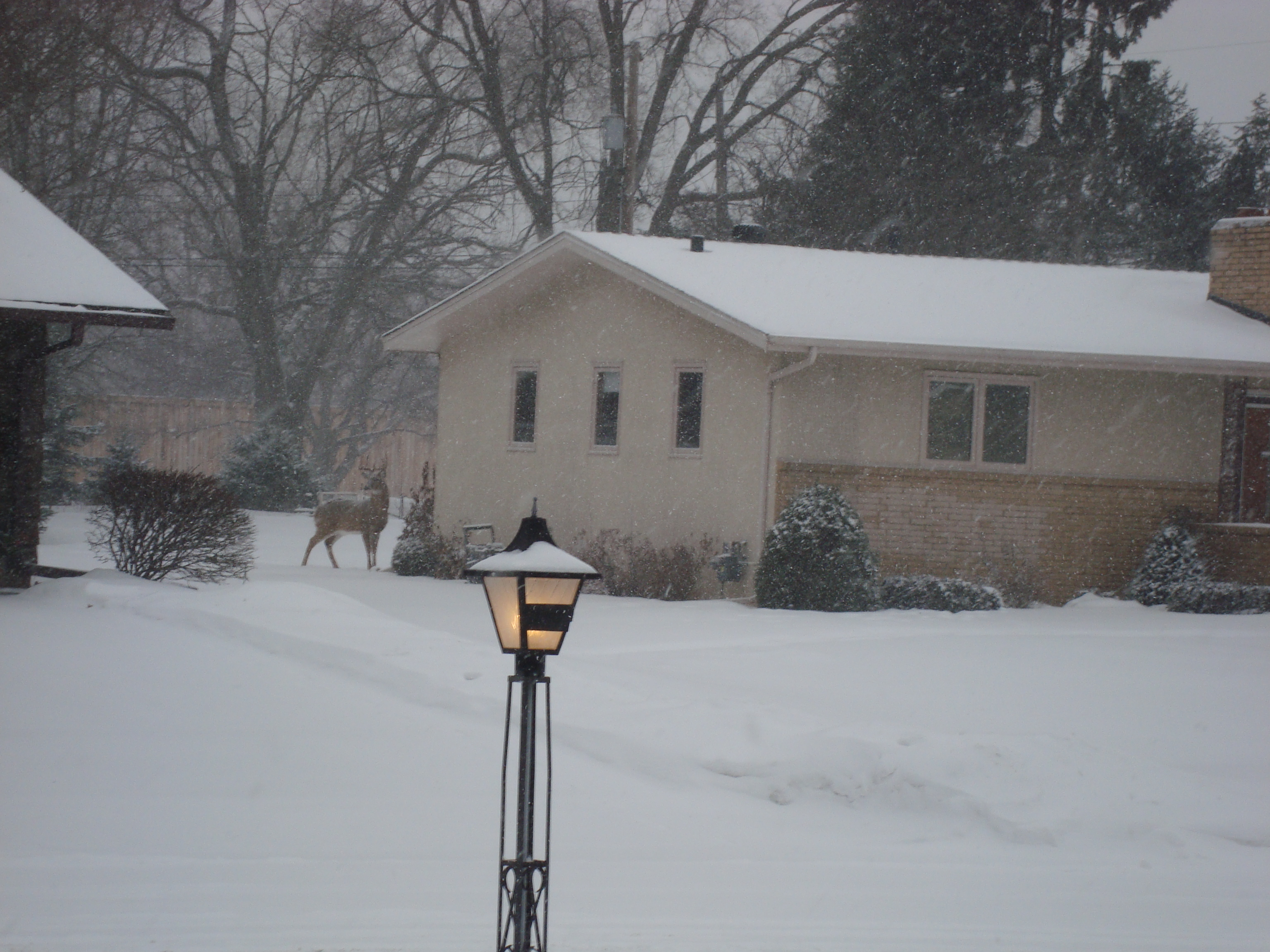
A deer in a Golden Valley neighborhood

Historical population
Census	Pop.	Note	%±
1860	301		—
1870	1,173		289.7%
1880	2,752		134.6%
1890	509		−81.5%
1900	680		33.6%
1910	692		1.8%
1920	830		19.9%
1930	1,320		59.0%
1940	2,048		55.2%
1950	5,551		171.0%
1960	14,559		162.3%
1970	24,246		66.5%
1980	22,775		−6.1%
1990	20,971		−7.9%
2000	20,281		−3.3%
2010	20,371		0.4%
2020	22,552		10.7%
2024 (est.)	21,263		−5.7%
U.S. Decennial Census; 2020 Census

=== Racial and ethnic composition ===
Golden Valley, Minnesota – racial and ethnic composition Note: the US Census treats Hispanic/Latino as an ethnic category. This table excludes Latinos from the racial categories and assigns them to a separate category. Hispanics/Latinos may be of any race.
Race / ethnicity (NH = non-Hispanic)	Pop. 2000	Pop. 2010	Pop. 2020	% 2000	% 2010	% 2020
White alone (NH)	18,236	17,113	18,036	89.92%	84.01%	79.98%
Black or African American alone (NH)	720	1,412	1,512	3.55%	6.93%	6.70%
Native American or Alaska Native alone (NH)	51	72	54	0.25%	0.35%	0.24%
Asian alone (NH)	581	708	849	2.86%	3.48%	3.76%
Pacific Islander alone (NH)	5	4	0	0.02%	0.02%	0.00%
Other race alone (NH)	30	40	131	0.15%	0.20%	0.58%
Mixed race or multiracial (NH)	301	484	1,114	1.48%	2.38%	4.94%
Hispanic or Latino (any race)	357	538	856	1.76%	2.64%	3.80%
Total	20,281	20,371	22,552	100.00%	100.00%	100.00%

=== 2020 census ===
As of the 2020 census, 22,552 people, 9,957 households, and 5,829 families were residing in the city. The population density was 2,211.6 inhabitants per square mile (853.9/km^{2}), and the 10,495 housing units had an average density of 1,028.5 per square mile (397.1/km^{2}).

The median age was 42.2 years. 17.5% of residents were under the age of 18 and 21.6% were 65 years of age or older. For every 100 females there were 96.4 males, and for every 100 females age 18 and over there were 94.7 males age 18 and over.

100.0% of residents lived in urban areas, while 0.0% lived in rural areas.

Of the 9,957 households, 23.1% had children under the age of 18 living in them. Of all households, 48.0% were married-couple households, 17.7% were households with a male householder and no spouse or partner present, and 26.7% were households with a female householder and no spouse or partner present. About 31.7% of all households were made up of individuals and 14.6% had someone living alone who was 65 years of age or older.

Of the housing units, 5.1% were vacant. The homeowner vacancy rate was 0.8% and the rental vacancy rate was 8.1%.

Racial composition as of the 2020 census
Race	Number	Percent
White	18,187	80.6%
Black or African American	1,529	6.8%
American Indian and Alaska Native	82	0.4%
Asian	853	3.8%
Native Hawaiian and Other Pacific Islander	0	0.0%
Some other race	350	1.6%
Two or more races	1,551	6.9%
Hispanic or Latino (of any race)	856	3.8%

=== 2010 census ===
As of the 2010 census, 20,371 people, 8,816 households, and 5,417 families lived in the city. The population density was 1,998.2 inhabitants per square mile (771.5/km^{2}). The 9,349 housing units had an average density of 917.47 per square mile (354.2/km^{2}). The racial makeup of the city was 85.37% White, 7.07% African American, 0.42% Native American, 3.55% Asian, 0.88% from some other races and 2.71% from two or more races. Hispanic or Latino people of any race were 2.64% of the population.

Of the 8,816 households, 25.6% had children under 18 living with them, 50.3% were married couples living together, 8.1% had a female householder with no husband present, 3.1% had a male householder with no wife present, and 38.6% were not families. About 30.4% of all households were made up of individuals, and 14.5% had someone living alone who was 65 or older. The average household size was 2.26 and the average family size was 2.84.

The median age in the city was 45.7 years. The age distribution was 19.9% under 18, 5.1% from 18 to 24, 23.7% from 25 to 44, 30.9% from 45 to 64, and 20.3% were 65 or older. The gender makeup of the city was 48.6% male and 51.4% female.

=== 2000 census ===
As of the 2000 census, 20,281 people, 8,449 households, and 5,508 families were living in the city. The population density was 1,982.3 inhabitants per square mile (765.4/km^{2}). The 8,589 housing units had an average density of 839.5 per square mile (324.1/km^{2}). The racial makeup of the city was 91.07% White, 3.59% African American, 0.29% Native American, 2.87% Asian, 0.58% from some other race, and 1.61% from two or more races. Hispanic or Latino people of any race were 1.76% of the population.

Of the 8,449 households, 26.5% had children under 18 living with them, 55.5% were married couples living together, 7.5% had a female householder with no husband present, and 34.8% were not families; 27.6% of all households were made up of individuals, and 12.1% had someone living alone who was 65 or older. The average household size was 2.31 and the average family size was 2.84.

In the city, the age distribution was 20.6% under 18, 5.0% from 18 to 24, 28.2% from 25 to 44, 26.5% from 45 to 64, and 19.6% who were 65 or older. The median age was 43 years. For every 100 females, there were 93.7 males. For every 100 females 18 and over, there were 89.9 males.

The median income for a household in the city was $62,063, and for a family was $75,899. Males had a median income of $49,890 versus $35,967 for females. The per capita income for the city was $34,094. About 0.8% of families and 3.0% of the population were below the poverty line, including 2.2% of those under 18 and 3.6% of those 65 or over.

=== 2023 American Community Survey ===
As of the 2023 American Community Survey, an estimated 9,671 households were in Golden Valley, with an average of 2.22 persons per household. The city has a median household income of $114,435. About 8.1% of the city's population lived at or below the poverty line. Golden Valley had an estimated 66.5% employment rate, with 61.7% of the population holding a bachelor's degree or higher and 96.7% holding a high-school diploma.

The top-five reported ancestries (people were allowed to report up to two ancestries, thus the figures generally add to more than 100%) were English (88.4%), Spanish (3.4%), Indo-European (6.1%), Asian and Pacific Islander (1.5%), and other (0.6%).

== Government ==
Golden Valley is a statutory city, where the mayor votes with the city council, and operates under the council–manager form of government. The city council sets the policy and overall direction for the city, and appoints a city manager to serve as administrator. The city manager directs city staff in carrying out council decisions and providing services.

The mayor serves a four-year term. The four council members serve staggered four-year terms. Two council seats are up for election every two years, in odd-numbered years. The council members run citywide, with no wards. The current mayor is Roslyn Harmon. The current city council includes Tracey Fussy, Sophia Ginis, Maurice Harris, and Chris Queitzsch.

== Politics ==
Golden Valley is in Minnesota's 5th congressional district, represented in the U.S. House of Representatives by Ilhan Omar, a Democrat. The city is split between two state legislative districts: 46A, represented by Representative Larry Kraft and Senator Ron Latz, and 45B, represented by Representative Patty Acomb and Senator Kelly Morrison. All four are Democrats.

Presidential election results

Precinct General Election Results
Year	Republican	Democratic	Third parties
2024	21.8% 3,305	76.0% 11,546	2.2% 335
2020	22.7% 3,590	75.1% 11,896	2.2% 348
2016	24.1% 3,313	68.0% 9,365	7.9% 1,093
2012	32.8% 4,595	65.3% 9,153	1.9% 262
2008	32.7% 4,564	65.9% 9,205	1.4% 208
2004	36.9% 5,138	61.9% 8,610	1.2% 163
2000	36.9% 4,792	57.0% 7,402	6.1% 793
1996	35.5% 4,347	56.6% 6,926	7.9% 973
1992	32.7% 4,486	47.9% 6,575	19.4% 2,673
1988	49.6% 6,666	50.4% 6,785	0.0% 0
1984	54.8% 7,541	45.2% 6,231	0.0% 0
1980	46.6% 6,347	40.6% 5,522	12.8% 1,745
1976	54.4% 7,266	43.8% 5,841	1.8% 239
1972	61.3% 7,491	37.3% 4,553	1.4% 168
1968	51.7% 5,680	45.6% 5,013	2.7% 302
1964	50.5% 4,749	49.2% 4,629	0.3% 25
1960	61.6% 4,422	38.3% 2,749	0.1% 10
1956	67.9% 3,368	31.7% 1,571	0.4% 21

== Notable people ==
- Lucinda Anderson, Olmypic Biathlete
- John R. Arlandson, Minnesota state legislator and lawyer
- Tom Barnard, KQRS radio morning show host and voice-over artist
- Scott Z. Burns, screenwriter, producer, director
- David King, drummer of the Bad Plus, Happy Apple, and other groups
- Brian Klaas, political commentator, author, and professor
- Jordan Leopold, former player for U.S. Olympic hockey team and the Minnesota Wild
- Trent Lockett, professional basketball player
- Kelly Lynch, actress
- Lynne Osterman, Minnesota state legislator
- Aaron Sele, former Major League Baseball pitcher
- Craig Taborn, jazz pianist
