= MiG (album) =

Studio album by MiG Ayesa
- Released: April 2007
- Label: Decca Records
- Producer: Matthew Wilder

MiG is MiG Ayesa's debut self-titled solo album, first released in April 2007. It is made up of rock covers with orchestral arrangements, including an arrangement of "Baby, I Love Your Way" which original artist, Peter Frampton, played the acoustic guitar in. A second version was later released, containing 3 originals, "She Loved", "Could It Be" and "You and I".

== Track listing ==
1. "Baby, I Love Your Way" featuring Peter Frampton (Peter Frampton)
2. "Kiss from a Rose" (Seal)
3. "Life on Mars?" (David Bowie)
4. "Waterloo Sunset" (Ray Davies)
5. "Can't Find My Way Home" (Steve Winwood)
6. "Wrapped Around Your Finger" (Sting)
7. "Have You Ever Seen the Rain?" (John Fogerty)
8. "Who Wants to Live Forever" (Brian May)
9. "Someone Saved My Life Tonight" (Elton John, Bernie Taupin)
10. "Jeremy" (Eddie Vedder, Jeff Ament)
11. "Angie" (Mick Jagger, Keith Richards)

=== U.S. track listing ===
1. "Baby, I Love Your Way" featuring Peter Frampton
2. "She Loved" (MiG Ayesa and Matthew Wilder)
3. "Kiss from a Rose"
4. "Life on Mars?"
5. "Could It Be" (MiG Ayesa and Matthew Wilder)
6. "Waterloo Sunset"
7. "Can't Find My Way Home"
8. "Wrapped Around Your Finger"
9. "Who Wants to Live Forever"
10. "You and I" (Ayesa and Matthew Wilder)
11. "Jeremy"
12. "Angie"
