= Luton Town MIGs =

Football hooligan "firm"

- Founded: 1982; 44 years ago
- Founding location: Luton, Bedfordshire, England
- Years active: 1982–present
- Territory: Luton area
- Activities: Football hooliganism, riots and street fighting

The MIGs (Men in Gear) are a football hooligan "firm" associated with the English football club Luton Town, which was originally formed in the 1980s.

== History ==
=== 1980s ===
The MIGs formed around 1982, taking over from the "bovver boy" skinhead type hooligans of the 1970s, wearing designer clothes and trainers (hence Men In Gear) and became highly organised. Also, for the first time, becoming multi-racial and integrated from the various estates in the town, some received banning orders or prison sentences. They have had rivalries with firms from Watford and Queens Park Rangers.

The events on 13 March 1985 when Millwall visited Kenilworth Road to play Luton Town in an FA Cup quarter final match, whilst not instigated by the MIGs had an effect on future matches between the two clubs. The hooligan element among Millwall's fans started to riot, and invaded the pitch. The game was halted after just 14 minutes of play and the referee took both teams off for 25 minutes. When he blew the final whistle, the pitch was invaded again. Over 700 seats were ripped out of the stands and the surrounding streets also saw more violence. The violence that ensued resulted in a ban on away fans by Luton Town, which in turn resulted in Luton's expulsion from the League Cup. The ban on away fans was lifted by Luton in the 1990–91 season.

"Operation Spoonbill" in March 1988 saw the arrest of eight fans during dawn raids on 17 homes by police. The arrested were aged between 24 and 38 and were accused of belonging to a gang called the 'MIGs'. All were charged with conspiracy to commit acts of disorder. Eventually all the conspiracy charges were dropped, though five were charged with lesser public order offences.

=== 1990s ===
A group of MIGs hooligans were involved in a mass brawl with members of the Lea Valley chapter of the Hells Angels Motorcycle Club at the Blockers Arms public house in Luton in May 1990. The MIGs gained the upper hand, forcing the bikers from the pub. With further violence seeming inevitable, undercover police officers were assigned to observe key figures on both sides. However, the MIGs decided to pay the Hells Angels £2,000 in compensation rather than face the continued threat of retaliation.

=== 2000s ===
In March 2000, on the fifteenth anniversary of the Luton riot, a group calling themselves "MIGs 2000" were blamed for revenge attacks on Millwall fans when the two teams met at Kenilworth Road. Bedfordshire Police said that they were aware, weeks before the match, of plans by MIGs 2000, to attack Millwall fans in retribution for the events of 1985. They were said to want revenge with the attitude of, "They've trashed our town once they're not doing it again."

The police launched a huge match day operation, bringing in 130 police officers as well as police horses, dogs and a helicopter. Ten people were arrested on the day of the match. Before the match two pubs where Millwall fans were drinking were attacked. About 30 MIG 2000 threw bottles at the Duke of Clarence in Upper George Street at about 1:30 pm and tried to force their way into the pub to attack Millwall fans peacefully drinking inside. Glass doors were smashed and the manager ordered his staff out of the bar for their own safety. Police had to deal with a similar incident an hour later outside the Nelson Flagship pub in Dunstable Road when the Luton gang had doubled. Whilst Millwall fans had a fierce reputation, it was the local Luton hooligans who were entirely blamed for the violence and the Millwall fans were praised for their generally good behaviour.

Earlier that season, Luton fans were strongly criticised by the police when, during a home game against Cardiff City, they set fire to a Welsh flag in the wooden main stand which the police said could have sparked a serious disturbance, and caused a tragedy.

In November 2001, Luton hooligans left the train at Leicester and ambushed 30 members of Leicester City’s "Baby Squad" at the station. Police had to draw batons to break up the fight. The Mig Crew had exited the train on the way back from a League game at Mansfield Town.

In 2001 it was reported that tensions were running high in Luton, a town with a 30,000 Muslim community accounting for 20% of the town's population. On 2 November, Asian shops and homes were warned by the police to be prepared for possible attacks over the weekend by members of the MIGs, described as being "a gang of white football hooligans who terrorised Luton Asians 10 years ago". A local Luton newspaper reported that the MIGs had met in the Nags Head Inn in Dunstable the previous Monday evening, 29 October, to draw up a "battle plan". The landlady of the pub denied any such meeting had taken place.

Twenty four Luton fans were arrested in September 2002 after violence at a Worthington Cup match against Watford at Vicarage Road on 10 September. Ten minutes before the game was due to start, rival fans fought running battles on the pitch after dozens of Luton fans had jumped over advertising hoardings and run onto the pitch. One fan was seen tearing up a corner flag and brandishing it like a weapon. The kick-off was delayed 15 minutes and riot police eventually restored order by forcing the fans back into their seats and blocking off the area behind the Vicarage Road goal. There had also been violence in Watford town centre before the match, with what was described as an "orchestrated" and "arranged" fight outside the Moon Under Water pub. The Football Association launched an investigation into the day's events, and when The Football League also announced that they would be launching an investigation, the two football authorities agreed to launch a joint investigation. Both clubs said they would ban for life any of their fans found to be involved.

Nearly a year later, in August 2003, at the start of the 2003–04 season, it was revealed that most MIG members had not attended any Luton Town matches since the match with Watford the previous season, with most of the 24 still awaiting trial. Bedfordshire Police had received money to help stamp out hooliganism, with £200,000 earmarked for an investigation into the fighting at the Watford match in the 2002–03 season and some going toward preventing opposing fans from causing trouble that season with Luton apparently being seen as an easy target, and Luton followers seen as an "easy touch" by other hooligan firms. In December 2003, ten Luton fans and four Watford fans were jailed at Luton Crown Court for between seven and fifteen months for their part in the fighting on the pitch at Vicarage Road the previous season. and a day later six Luton fans were jailed for between eight and fourteen months for their part in the fight at the Moon Under Water pub.

A report by the BBC in April 2005 "found Luton to be largely free from football hooliganism – high or low-level."

In November 2005, Police arrested 18 Luton hooligans after fighting broke out at the Black Horse, in Coventry Road as yobs battled each other both inside and outside the premises, using bar furniture as weapons. One local resident, who asked not to be named, said: "It was really bad. I saw one lad with his arm broken and his face smashed up. It's not very nice for the area."

In October 2007, Luton and Nottingham Forest hooligans clashed after a League One game in which two Forest hooligans required hospital treatment after violent clashes, one for a head injury. Police arrested five Luton hooligans for public order offences and one Forest hooligan for throwing a missile. In addition to the trouble at the game, ten Luton hooligans were banned from football matches in England and Wales for up to five years.

In March 2008, The Southwark News reported on violent clashes between Millwall and Luton thugs near Rotherhithe New Road and Rotherhithe Old Road and also earlier in The Surrey Docks area. The running battles reached a climax at Whelan's public house with the Millwall group barricading themselves inside. Four arrests were reported.

In September 2009, before a match between Oxford United and Luton, there were arrests on the night as a result of "minor disorder before the match" involving mainly Luton hooligans.

=== 2010s ===
In March 2010 it was reported that Hayes and Yeading wanted Luton to be promoted from the Conference – so they would not have to play them the following season.

On 4 May 2010, Luton hooligans stormed onto the Kenilworth Road pitch after losing 2-0 on aggregate in the play-off semi-finals to York City. This caused the York players to be taken up to the top of the away stand for safety. The Luton hooligans started throwing coins, bottles and other missiles at the York players and fans. Richard Brodie, a York striker, told the police that he was hit on the head with a pound coin after he was ushered back into safety. The Luton hooligans rioted for hours after the match through the streets of Luton. By 23 September 2011, six Luton men were jailed for up to 13 months in prison and 23 other offenders received lesser sentences.

Football hooligans from Lincoln and Luton were jailed in December 2013 for a total of almost 30 years for an attack on rival fans before the Lincoln City and Luton Town match in October 2012.

An outbreak of fighting in August 2018 before a match between Luton Town and Southend United resulted in sentences of between 8 and 31 months plus a total of 47 years of football banning orders for Luton hooligans. Prosecutor Thomas Godfrey told the court the clash had all the "hallmarks" of being "orchestrated" and arranged in advance. The banning orders mean those convicted cannot attend any club games or international fixtures in the UK or follow England abroad. In addition, the men cannot go into Luton town centre when the club is playing at home or go to any town or city where the team is playing an away match.

Luton Town and Bristol City F.C. hooligans engaged in a mass brawl after a football match in November 2019. Rival groups of opposing football fans were involved in the disorder and several assaults took place.

== Tommy Robinson ==
Ex-MIG member, Tommy Robinson, has written two books about his experiences with the firm:

- MIG Crew is about the MIGs firm. Its foreword is by one of Britain's most notorious prisoners, Charles Bronson.
- MIG Down charts his 25 years in football violence.

The ex-English Defence League leader, Stephen Yaxley-Lennon, took on the hooligan's name as a pseudonym.
