= Marty Casey =

American singer

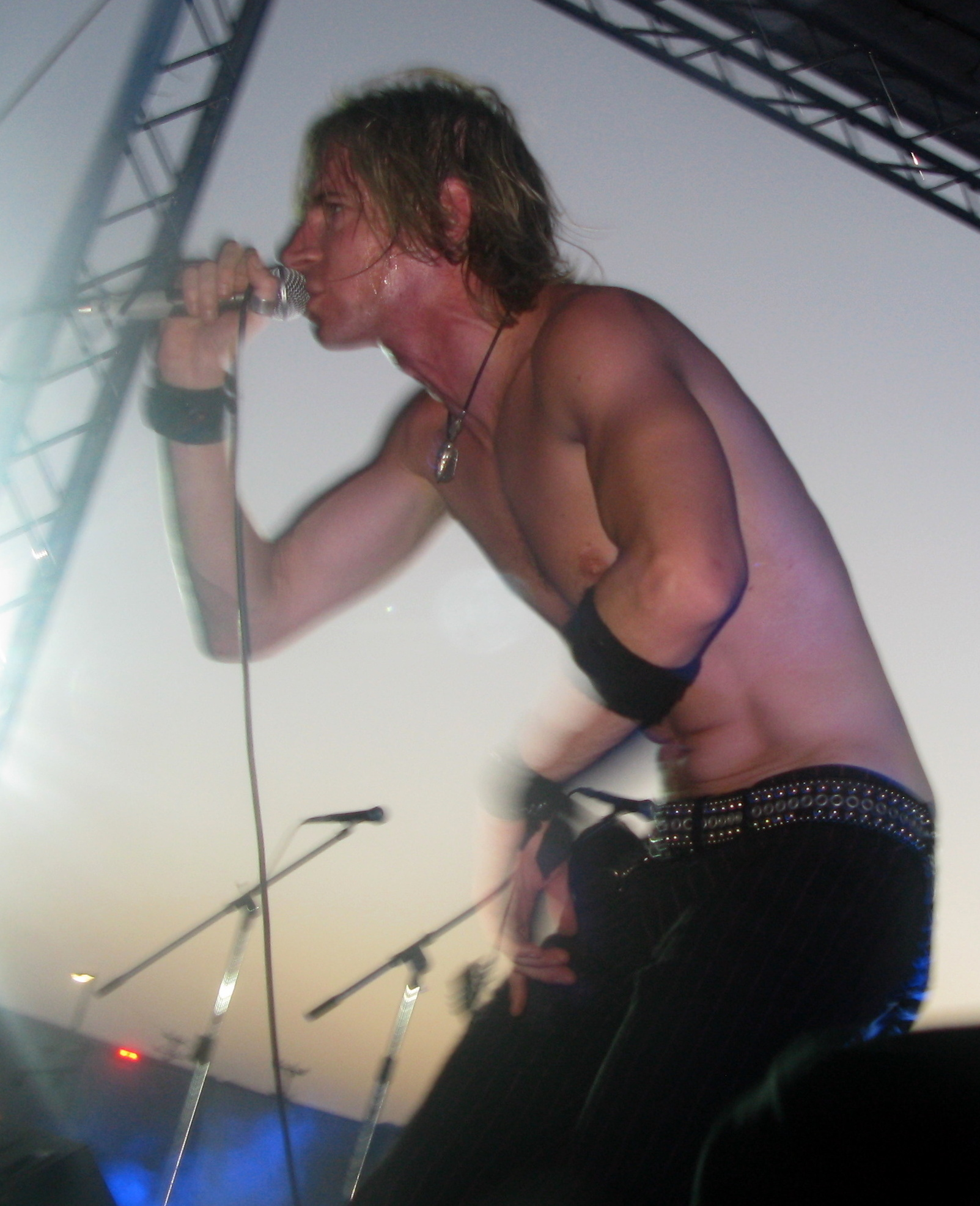
- Casey with Tracii Guns' L.A. Guns in 2008

Background information
- Born: Martin Xavier Casey; September 26, 1973 (age 52)
- Origin: Chicago, Illinois, U.S.
- Genres: Alternative rock; indie rock; post-grunge; hard rock
- Occupations: Singer; musician; songwriter
- Instruments: Vocals; guitar
- Years active: 1987–present
- Member of: Lovehammers

Martin Xavier "Marty" Casey (born September 26, 1973) is an American rock musician who is the lead singer, primary songwriter and second guitarist of Lovehammers. After years of building a strong local following in Chicago and the Midwest, Casey achieved international fame on the first season of the reality show Rock Star: INXS. Casey made it to the final two of the competition, finishing as the runner-up to winner J.D. Fortune. Although he was not chosen as the new singer for INXS, he was invited to tour as opening act. In 2006, Marty Casey and the Lovehammers opened on the first leg of the INXS Switched On Tour. Marty was a fan favorite on Rock Star: INXS, receiving the most viewer votes, and topping the download charts with his performances of both covers and original material.

== Biography ==
=== Early life ===
The youngest of six children, Marty Casey was born in the Chicago suburb of Hickory Hills, Illinois. As a child and youth, he was an avid sportsman, competing in both baseball and wrestling. When he was eight years old he met future Swinging Lovehammers bandmates Bobby and Dino Kourelis while playing together on a local T-Ball team. Casey and the Kourelis brothers formed Lovehammers (initially named The Swinging Lovehammers) in 1988. During this time Casey attended Amos Alonzo Stagg High School in Palos Hills, Illinois. After receiving a degree in Finance at the University of Illinois at Urbana–Champaign, he worked part-time as a real estate appraiser while continuing to record and tour with his band. He was a member of Star Course, a student run organization at the University of Illinois. He was also a member of Delta Sigma Phi fraternity.

While touring with artists including Nickelback, Jerry Cantrell, Interpol, New Found Glory, and Cake, Casey and the Lovehammers began to build a small but loyal following.

His musical influences include: Guns N' Roses, AC/DC, Cyndi Lauper, Rob Bass, Joe Cocker, and Accept.

A number of the band's songs have been included in television shows and movies. The group's DVD, "Live/Raw" charted well on the Billboard musical DVD charts in 2004. Casey was a finalist in the annual John Lennon Songwriting Contest, with his song "Rain on the Brain," featured on the L'Strange album.

=== Rock Star: INXS ===
During the competition, Casey gained the respect of the INXS band members as well as viewers. His performances consistently received high marks, and he received the most votes of any contestant on the show. Near the end of the competition, he performed his original song "Trees", which became a fan favorite. "Trees" was picked up by mainstream radio.

Casey's extended family and long-term fans (known as Hammerheads) were very supportive of his run on the show, co-hosting viewing parties for the fans at Chicago bars, and even organizing shuttle buses to bring fans to the parties. Casey spoke frequently of being "humbled" and "honored" by all the support he received.

On his Rock Star: INXS blog, Casey wrote: "I love writing music and I think performing those creations completes the cycle and helps me define my life. Writing music is the thought and performing is the action. Great thoughts must be put into action in order to exist. Action without thought can be a train wreck."

=== Post Rock Star: INXS ===
After revealing J.D. Fortune as the winner and new INXS front man, INXS guitarist Tim Farriss offered Casey the job of opening act on INXS's upcoming tour, which Casey accepted. During the tour, Casey and his band released their major label debut, Marty Casey and Lovehammers (released January 24, 2006, through Epic Records). The album could be described as a "best-of" compilation of songs from previous indie albums, though songs were chosen largely on the basis of accessibility as well as to showcase the band to a more mainstream audience. Though some songs were re-recorded and remixed for the recording, the album featured only one completely new track. There was some criticism that the album was sold under "Marty Casey and Lovehammers" as opposed to their current bandname – "Swinging Lovehammers" – however, fans generally understood that the album's purpose was to capitalize on Marty's TV exposure and to increase their fan base.

Casey continues to tour with Lovehammers, now as headliners. As natives of Chicago's South Side, they are avid fans of the Chicago White Sox, and were particularly excited to be asked to play before some games in October 2005 and 2006.

In 2008, he joined Tracii Guns' version of LA Guns. He both co-wrote and provided vocals, touring with the L.A. Guns through 2009. In a 2009 interview, Tracii stated that L.A. Guns parted ways with Alexus Records and that he was unsure whether the material recorded with Marty Casey or the VH1 pilot would ever be released.

Casey returned to the Lovehammers in 2009 in order to record and release the album Heavy Crown.

In January 2009, Casey conducted a two-week solo acoustic tour of New Zealand, in support of charity CanTeen, which supports young people living with cancer. The tour was run by Christchurch resident Tania Gilchrist. One New Zealand radio interview took place in Invercargill on January, 12th 2009, airing on 89.2 MORE FM's The Morning Fix with Andy George Andy George. It can be viewed here.

== Discography ==
=== Studio Albums ===
See also: Lovehammers Discography

Title	Album details	Peak positions
Title	Album details	US
Marty Casey and Lovehammers^{[A]}	Release date: 2006; Label: Epic Records	67
The Ground You Walk On	Release date: 2017	—
"—" denotes releases that did not chart

A Also an official studio album for Lovehammers

=== Soundtrack Albums ===
Title	Album details	Peak positions
Title	Album details	US
Rock Star: A Night At The Mayan Theatre (with various artists)	Release date: 2005; Label: Burnett/Epic Records	68
"—" denotes releases that did not chart

=== Singles ===
Single	Year	Peak chart positions		Certifications	Album
Single	Year	US (Pop)	US Digital	Certifications	Album
"Wish You Were Here"	2005	71	74		"Non-album single"
"Trees"	2005	97	—		"Non-album single"
"—" denotes single that did not chart

=== DVD Releases ===
- Live/Raw (2004) (With Lovehammers)
- Rock Star: INXS / The DVD (2005)
- And the Rest is History... (2006) (With Lovehammers)

=== Music Videos ===
- Merry Christmas (All Year Long) (2006) (View here)
- Sleeper (2008) by Stock Yard Film (View here)
- Price I Pay (2013) (View here)

== See also ==
- Lovehammers
- INXS
- Rockstar: INXS
- LA Guns
