= Rock Star: INXS =

American TV show

- Hosted by: Brooke Burke; Dave Navarro
- Judges: Tim Farriss; Andrew Farriss; Jon Farriss; Kirk Pengilly; Garry Gary Beers
- No. of contestants: 15
- Winner: J.D. Fortune
- Runner-up: Marty Casey
- No. of episodes: 32

Release
- Original network: CBS; VH1 in-house episodes from mid-August to finale
- Original release: July 11 – September 20, 2005

Season chronology
- Next → Supernova

Rock Star: INXS is the first season of the reality television show Rock Star where fifteen contestants competed to become the lead vocalist for the Australian rock band INXS.

INXS enjoyed great popularity through the 1980s and early 1990s, but after frontman Michael Hutchence died in 1997, the band attempted to continue with alternate singers, but remained largely dormant until this show. The winner of the series, J. D. Fortune, was announced on Tuesday, September 20, 2005, and became the band's new lead singer. Following the series, on November 29, 2005, the band released the studio album Switch with Fortune on lead vocals.

== Background ==
Contestants were housed in the Paramour Mansion, and squared off in a singing contest featuring well-known rock songs. Each week, viewers voted for their favorite contestant. The three contestants with the fewest votes performed an INXS song the following night. The members of the band then decided which contestant would be sent home, with lead guitarist Tim Farriss invoking the show's catchphrase to the departing contestant, "You're just not right for our band, INXS."

The show originally appeared three nights a week on CBS. The format consisted of a half-hour behind-the-scenes episode on Monday, a one-hour performance episode on Tuesday and a half-hour elimination episode on Wednesday. However, on August 3, 2005, CBS announced the behind-the-scenes episode would move to Sunday nights on VH1 effective August 7, 2005, due to low ratings in the United States. As the show continued, the ratings improved. This prompted the Wednesday results show to be expanded to one hour for the duration of its run. The winner, J. D. Fortune, was announced on Tuesday, September 20, 2005.

Runner-up Marty Casey and his Chicago-based band Lovehammers were invited to open for INXS on their 2006 tour.

Directed by Michael A. Simon, the show was executive produced by Survivor's Mark Burnett and hosted by Brooke Burke and former Jane's Addiction and Red Hot Chili Peppers guitarist Dave Navarro. Other executive producers were David Goffin (American Idol, On the Lot, Eco-Challenge, Combat Missions), Lisa Hennessy (Eco-Challenge) and INXS managers David Edwards and Michael Murchison, with Conrad Riggs as co-executive producer.

Five musicians (Paul Mirkovich, Jim McGorman, Nate Morton, Sasha Krivtsov, and Rafael Moreira) made up the house band that backed the 15 contestants during the show.

A.J. Dickerson and Scott C. Wilson were among the many video editors of the Tuesday performance shows. Scott C. Wilson did the final mixes on the Tuesday performance shows.

== Finals ==
Three contestants reached the finale: Mig Ayesa, Marty Casey, and J. D. Fortune. Fortune was considered by many the underdog of the three as he established a renegade image during the competition, while Casey was considered the favorite due to his popularity with voters. In the finale, Ayesa, Casey, and Fortune each selected a song that was performed previously on the show. Ayesa chose Queen's "Bohemian Rhapsody", Casey chose Pink Floyd's "Wish You Were Here", and Fortune chose The Rolling Stones' "You Can't Always Get What You Want". Based on these performances, INXS eliminated Ayesa.

Afterwards, Casey and Fortune each performed an INXS song with, for the first time on the show, all five members of INXS. Casey performed "Don't Change" and Fortune performed "What You Need". Following the performances, INXS announced Fortune as the winner.

== Original songs ==
During the competition, Casey and Fortune performed two original songs that became fan favorites. Both songs would receive multiple encores during the competition. Casey's original song was called "Trees" and was described by host Dave Navarro as a song that he could imagine being heard on the radio "today". In fact, the song received some radioplay as a result of its exposure on the show.

At one point in the competition, the remaining eight contestants were divided into two teams of four and challenged to write lyrics to a melody written by Andrew Farriss. When Fortune did not see eye to eye with his team (which included Casey), he decided to venture out on his own and write his own lyrics. Initially considered to have jeopardized his chances of winning the competition (since it was perceived he couldn't work in a team), Fortune's move resulted in his creation of the lyrics of "Pretty Vegas", which became a favorite of INXS, played a major role in his ultimate victory, and became the first single from their new album Switch.

== Top 15 finalists ==
The following is a list of songs performed by each finalist during the competition. The number represents the week in which the song was performed. Except for the second week, each week one finalist was asked to perform an encore performance of the song they performed the night before, noted as an "Encore Performance".

Each week (except for the first and final weeks), the three finalists who had the lowest total audience votes were asked to perform an INXS song of the band's choice, noted as a "Bottom 3 Performance". After everyone performed one non-INXS song in the first and last episodes, the band chose one contestant to be eliminated out of the entire group. There was no voting for the bottom three.

In the seventh week, two contestants were given the chance to perform original songs (Mig & Deanna.)

For the ninth week performance episode, each contestant performed an original song as well as a non-INXS song. In the elimination episode that week, all the remaining contestants plus Dave Navarro performed as an ensemble with INXS on their new track Us, as the opening act for that week's encore.

For the tenth week performance, INXS chose two songs for each of the remaining contestants to perform.

The ages given below were the ages of the contestants during the recording of the show.

- J. D. Fortune – 32 years old, born September 1, 1973, in Mississauga, Ontario, but raised in Salt Springs, Nova Scotia (Winner, selected to be the lead singer of INXS, September 20, 2005) Formerly lived in his car.

1. "American Woman" (The Guess Who)
1. "California Dreamin'" (The Mamas & the Papas) – Encore Performance
2. "Hand in My Pocket" (Alanis Morissette)
3. "We Are the Champions" (Queen)
4. "The Letter" (Joe Cocker)
5. "Crazy" (Seal)
6. "As Tears Go By" (The Rolling Stones)
7. "Cold as Ice" (Foreigner)
8. "Suspicious Minds" (Elvis Presley)

Bottom 3 Performance This Time" (INXS)

9. "Come as You Are" (Nirvana)
9. "Pretty Vegas" (J. D. Fortune) – Encore Performance
9. "Us" (INXS) – Ensemble of remaining contestants with INXS

Bottom 3 Performance Mystify (INXS)

10. "Pretty Vegas" (J. D. Fortune) – Encore Performance (Note: Marty Casey won the encore but J.D. Fortune was selected to perform an additional encore by audience response.)
10. "Money" (Pink Floyd)

Bottom 3 Performance "By My Side" (INXS)

11. "You Can't Always Get What You Want" (The Rolling Stones)
11. "What You Need" (INXS)
11. "Easy Easy" (INXS)

- Marty Casey – 32 years old, from Chicago, Illinois (Eliminated last, September 20, 2005) Worked as a real estate appraiser.

1. "You Really Got Me" (The Kinks)
1. "Take Me Out" (Franz Ferdinand)
2. "What I Like About You" (The Romantics)
3. "Lithium" (Nirvana) – Encore Performance
4. "With Arms Wide Open" (Creed)
5. "Mr. Brightside" (The Killers)
6. "...Baby One More Time" (Britney Spears)
7. "I Alone" (Live)

Bottom 3 Performance "Don't Change" (INXS)

8. "Wish You Were Here" (Pink Floyd) – Encore Performance (Note: Suzie McNeil won the encore and was asked to choose another contestant to do an encore as well, so she chose Marty Casey.)
9. "Everlong" (Foo Fighters)
9. "Trees" (Marty Casey)
9. "Us" (INXS) – Ensemble of remaining contestants with INXS
10. "Trees" (Marty Casey) – Encore Performance
10. "Creep" (Radiohead)
11. "Wish You Were Here" (Pink Floyd)
11. "Don't Change" (INXS)

- MiG Ayesa – 35 years old, from London, England (born in the Philippines, and raised in Sydney) (Eliminated thirteenth, September 20, 2005) Best known for his role as Galileo Figaro in the musical We Will Rock You: a Tribute to the Music of Queen.

1. "Smells Like Teen Spirit" (Nirvana)
1. "All Day and All of the Night" (The Kinks)
2. "Walk This Way" (Aerosmith)
3. "Lola" (The Kinks)
4. "We Will Rock You" (Queen)
5. "All Right Now" (Free)
6. "Baby, I Love Your Way" (Peter Frampton) – Encore Performance
7. "Do or Die" (Mig Ayesa)
8. "Live and Let Die" (Paul McCartney)
9. "Hard to Handle" (Otis Redding)
9. "Home in Me" (Mig Ayesa)
9. "Us" (INXS) – Ensemble of remaining contestants with INXS
10. "Paint It Black" (The Rolling Stones)
10. "Kiss from a Rose" (Seal)

Bottom 3 Performance What You Need (INXS)

11. "Bohemian Rhapsody" (Queen)

- Suzie McNeil – 29 years old, from Toronto, Ontario (Originally from Mississauga, Ontario) (Eliminated twelfth, September 14, 2005)

1. "Remedy" (The Black Crowes)
1. "Call Me" (Blondie)

Bottom 3 Performance "Never Tear Us Apart" (INXS)

2. "Roxanne" (The Police)
3. "Superstition" (Stevie Wonder)
4. "Get Back" (The Beatles)
5. "Losing My Religion" (R.E.M.)

Bottom 3 Performance "Bitter Tears" (INXS)

6. "Bring It On Home to Me" (Sam Cooke) – Bottom 3 Performance By My Side (INXS)
7. "Start Me Up" (The Rolling Stones) – Encore Performance
8. "Bohemian Rhapsody" (Queen) – Encore Performance
9. "I Can't Make You Love Me" (Bonnie Raitt)
9. "Soul Life" (Suzie McNeil)
9. "Us" (INXS) – Ensemble of remaining contestants with INXS

Bottom 3 Performance "Never Tear Us Apart" (INXS)

10. "Interstate Love Song" (Stone Temple Pilots)
10. "What's Up" (4 Non Blondes)

Bottom 3 Performance "Suicide Blonde" (INXS)

- Jordis Unga – 23 years old, from St. Paul, Minnesota (Eliminated eleventh, September 7, 2005). The show's youngest contestant.

1. "Baba O'Riley" (The Who)
1. "Heart Shaped Box" (Nirvana)
2. "The Reason" (Hoobastank)
3. "Gimme Some Lovin'" (The Spencer Davis Group)
4. "The Man Who Sold the World" (David Bowie) – Encore Performance
5. "Layla" (Eric Clapton)
6. "Knockin' on Heaven's Door" (Bob Dylan)
7. "Dream On" (Aerosmith)
8. "Imagine" (John Lennon)

Bottom 3 Performance "Listen Like Thieves" (INXS)

9. "We Are the Champions" (Queen)
9. "Try Not" (Jordis Unga)
9. "Us" (INXS) – Ensemble of remaining contestants with INXS

Bottom 3 Performance "Need You Tonight" (INXS)

- Ty Taylor – 36 years old, from Las Vegas, Nevada (originally from Montclair, New Jersey) (Eliminated tenth, August 31, 2005). The show's oldest contestant.

1. "Cult of Personality" (Living Colour)
1. "Heartbreaker" (Pat Benatar)
2. "Somebody Told Me" (The Killers)
3. "Everybody Hurts" (R.E.M.)
4. "Everlong" (Foo Fighters)

Bottom 3 Performance "Kick" (INXS)

5. "No Woman No Cry" (Bob Marley) – Encore Performance
6. "Maggie May" (Rod Stewart)
7. "Proud Mary" (Creedence Clearwater Revival)

Bottom 3 Performance "What You Need" (INXS)

8. "You Can't Always Get What You Want" (The Rolling Stones)

Bottom 3 Performance "The One Thing" (INXS)

- Deanna Johnston – 36 years old, from Reseda, California (Originally from Kingston, Ontario) (Eliminated ninth, August 24, 2005).

1. "Piece of My Heart" (Janis Joplin)
1. "Should I Stay or Should I Go" (The Clash)
2. "The One I Love" (R.E.M.)
3. "Give a Little Bit" (Supertramp)
4. "I'm the Only One" (Melissa Etheridge)
5. "Long Train Running" (The Doobie Brothers)
6. "I Can't Make You Love Me" (Bonnie Raitt)

Bottom 3 Performance "Never Tear Us Apart" (INXS)

7. "My Truth" (Deanna Johnston)

Bottom 3 Performance "Elegantly Wasted" (INXS)

- Jessica Robinson – 26 years old, from Chicago, Illinois (Eliminated eighth, August 17, 2005)

1. "Celebrity Skin" (Hole)
1. "I Want You to Want Me" (Cheap Trick)
2. "Purple Haze" (Jimi Hendrix)

Bottom 3 Performance "Don't Change" (INXS)

3. "Because the Night" (Patti Smith)

Bottom 3 Performance "Elegantly Wasted" (INXS)

4. "Blister in the Sun" (Violent Femmes)
5. "Come as You Are" (Nirvana)

Bottom 3 Performance "Disappear" (INXS)

6. "Torn" (Natalie Imbruglia)

Bottom 3 Performance "Mystify" (INXS)

- Brandon Calhoon – 32 years old, from Beaverton, Michigan (Eliminated seventh, October 8, 2005)

1. "Rock and Roll All Nite" (KISS)
1. "Hard to Handle" (Otis Redding)
2. "Sweet Home Alabama" (Lynyrd Skynyrd)
3. "Tempted" (Squeeze)
4. "If You Could Only See" (Tonic)

Bottom 3 Performance "Devil Inside" (INXS)

5. "It's All Over Now" (The Rolling Stones)

Bottom 3 Performance "Don't Lose Your Head" (INXS)

- Tara Slone – 31 years old, from Toronto, Ontario (born in Montreal, Quebec and raised in Nova Scotia) (Eliminated sixth, March 8, 2005)

1. "Middle of the Road" (The Pretenders)
1. "Take It Easy" (Eagles)

Bottom 3 Performance "New Sensation" (INXS)

2. "Paranoid" (Black Sabbath) – Bottom 3 Performance "Mystify" (INXS)
3. "Suffragette City" (David Bowie)
4. "Message in a Bottle" (The Police)

Bottom 3 Performance "Beautiful Girl" (INXS)

- Heather Luttrell – 28 years old, from Atlanta, Georgia (Eliminated fifth, with Daphna Dove, July 27, 2005)

1. "Burning Down the House" (Talking Heads)
1. "Somebody to Love" (Jefferson Airplane)
2. "It's Only Rock 'n' Roll" (The Rolling Stones)
3. "If It Makes You Happy" (Sheryl Crow)

Bottom 3 Performance "By My Side" (INXS)

- Daphna Dove – 30 years old, from Los Angeles, California (born in Germany, and raised in New York City) (Eliminated fourth, with Heather Luttrell, July 27, 2005)

1. "One Way or Another" (Blondie)
1. "People Are Strange" (The Doors)
2. "I Hate Myself for Loving You" (Joan Jett)
3. "Rock the Casbah" (The Clash)

Bottom 3 Performance What You Need (INXS)

- Neal Carlson – 30 years old, from Queens, New York (Eliminated third, July 20, 2005)

1. "Brown Sugar" (The Rolling Stones)
1. "Fortunate Son" (Creedence Clearwater Revival)
2. "Summer of '69" (Bryan Adams)

Bottom 3 Performance Suicide Blonde (INXS)

- Wil Seabrook – 29 years old, from Pasadena, California (Originally from Morganton, North Carolina) (Eliminated second, July 13, 2005)

1. "Heroes" (David Bowie)
1. "Right Here Right Now" (Jesus Jones) – Bottom 3 Performance Need You Tonight (INXS)

- Dana Robbins – 31 years old, from Studio City, California (Originally from Las Vegas, Nevada) (Eliminated first)

1. "Knockin' on Heaven's Door" (Bob Dylan) (Note: The first episode in week one was a combined behind-the-scenes, performance, and elimination episode. The members of INXS themselves picked the bottom three contestants, and Dana Robbins was eliminated back at the mansion without any of the three performing an INXS song first.)

== Elimination chart ==
| Week: | | 1 | | 2 | 3 | 4 | 5 | 6 | 7 | 8 | 9 | | 10 | | 11 |
| Place | Contestant | Result | | | | | | | | | | | | | |
| 1 | J.D. Fortune | Btm 3 | Encore | | | | | | | Btm 3 | B3 | En | B3 | En | Winner |
| 2 | Marty Casey | | | | Encore | | | | Btm 3 | Encore | | | Encore | | Runner-up |
| 3 | Mig Ayesa | | | | | | | Encore | | | | | Btm 3 | | 3rd |
| 4 | Suzie McNeil | Btm 3 | Btm 3 | | | | Btm 3 | Btm 3 | Encore | Encore | Btm 3 | | Elim | | |
| 5 | Jordis Unga | | | | | Encore | | | | Btm 3 | Elim | | | | |
| 6 | Ty Taylor | | | | | Btm 3 | Encore | | Btm 3 | Elim | | | | | |
| 7 | Deanna Johnston | | | | | | | Btm 3 | Elim | | | | | | |
| 8 | Jessica Robinson | | | Btm 3 | Btm 3 | | Btm 3 | Elim | | | | | | | |
| 9 | Brandon Calhoun | | | | | Btm 3 | Elim | | | | | | | | |
| 10 | Tara Slone | | Btm 3 | Btm 3 | | Elim | | | | | | | | | |
| 11–12 | Heather Luttrell | | | | Elim | | | | | | | | | | |
| 11–12 | Daphna Dove | | | | Elim | | | | | | | | | | |
| 13 | Neal Carlson | | | Elim | | | | | | | | | | | |
| 14 | Wil Seabrook | | Elim | | | | | | | | | | | | |
| 15 | Dana Robbins | Elim | | | | | | | | | | | | | |

== A Night at the Mayan Theatre ==
The show spawned a soundtrack entitled A Night at the Mayan Theatre, containing the performance from each contestant from the premiere episode, as well as two bonus tracks of Jordis Unga performing "The Man Who Sold the World" and Mig Ayesa performing "Baby, I Love Your Way".

The list of the contestants' performances is:

- J. D. Fortune – "American Woman" (The Guess Who)
- Marty Casey – "You Really Got Me" (The Kinks)
- Mig Ayesa – "Smells Like Teen Spirit" (Nirvana) & "Baby, I Love Your Way" (Peter Frampton)
- Suzie McNeil – "Remedy" (The Black Crowes)
- Jordis Unga – "Baba O'Riley" (The Who) & "The Man Who Sold the World" (David Bowie)
- Ty Taylor – "Cult of Personality" (Living Colour)
- Deanna Johnston – "Piece of My Heart" (Janis Joplin)
- Jessica Robinson – "Celebrity Skin" (Hole)
- Brandon Calhoon – "Rock and Roll All Nite" (Kiss)
- Tara Slone – "Middle of the Road" (The Pretenders)
- Heather Luttrell – "Burning Down the House" (Talking Heads)
- Daphna Dove – "One Way or Another" (Blondie)
- Neal Carlson – "Brown Sugar" (The Rolling Stones)
- Wil Seabrook – "Heroes" (David Bowie)
- Dana Robbins – "Knockin' on Heaven's Door" (Bob Dylan)

== Rock Star: INXS The DVD ==
A DVD titled Rock Star: INXS The DVD was released on November 29, 2005, containing selected performances by the final six contestants (J. D. Fortune, Marty Casey, Mig Ayesa, Suzie McNeil, Jordis Unga, and Ty Taylor) as well as the post-finale mini-concert by INXS & J. D., short behind-the-scenes footage, and extras including the contestants' casting interviews and a photo slideshow: The DVD when RIAA Certified Gold in 2005.

- J.D.'s Welcome
- Show Performances

- The following performances with introductions (some not aired on the show) by the contestants:

1. J. D. Fortune – "California Dreamin'" (The Mamas & the Papas)†
2. Jordis Unga – "Heart-Shaped Box" (Nirvana)†
3. Suzie McNeil – "Losing My Religion" (R.E.M.)
4. Marty Casey – "Mr. Brightside" (The Killers)
5. Ty Taylor – "Everybody Hurts" (R.E.M.)†
6. Jordis Unga – "The Man Who Sold the World" (David Bowie)†
7. Mig Ayesa – "Live and Let Die" (Paul McCartney)
8. J. D. Fortune – "The Letter" (Joe Cocker)†
9. Marty Casey – "...Baby One More Time" (Britney Spears)
10. Suzie McNeil – "Bring It On Home to Me" (Sam Cooke)
11. Ty Taylor – "No Woman, No Cry" (Bob Marley)
12. Jordis Unga – "Imagine" (John Lennon)
13. Marty Casey – "Creep" (Radiohead)‡
14. Mig Ayesa – "Kiss from a Rose" (Seal)‡
15. J. D. Fortune – "Money" (Pink Floyd)
16. Marty Casey – "Wish You Were Here" (Pink Floyd)
17. Suzie McNeil – "Bohemian Rhapsody" (Queen)

† Includes the contestant's unaired intro.
‡ The contestant's intro for this performance differs from the one that was broadcast.

Unlike most of the soundtrack CD, the performances for Rock Star: INXS The DVD were taken from episodes throughout the series:

Week 1, Episode 2: J. D. Fortune – "California Dreamin'" (The Mamas & the Papas)↑, Jordis Unga – "Heart-Shaped Box" (Nirvana)
Week 3, Episode 8: Ty Taylor – "Everybody Hurts" (R.E.M.)
Week 4, Episode 11: Jordis Unga – "The Man Who Sold the World" (David Bowie)↑, J. D. Fortune – "The Letter" (Joe Cocker)
Week 5, Episode 14: Suzie McNeil – "Losing My Religion" (R.E.M.)↓, Marty Casey – "Mr. Brightside" (The Killers), Ty Taylor – "No Woman, No Cry" (Bob Marley)↑
Week 6, Episode 17 (INXS selected the songs): Marty Casey – "...Baby One More Time" (Britney Spears), Suzie McNeil – "Bring It On Home to Me" (Sam Cooke)↓
Week 8, Episode 23 (With choir, strings, & brass): Mig Ayesa – "Live and Let Die" (Paul McCartney), Jordis Unga – "Imagine" (John Lennon)↓, Marty Casey – "Wish You Were Here" (Pink Floyd)↑. Suzie McNeil – "Bohemian Rhapsody" (Queen)↑
Week 10, Episode 29 (INXS selected the songs): Marty Casey – "Creep" (Radiohead)↑, Mig Ayesa – "Kiss from a Rose" (Seal)↓, J. D. Fortune – "Money" (Pink Floyd)↓↑

↑Performance won an encore the following night.
↓Contestant was in bottom three in the elimination show following this performance.

- Continuous playback of the above performances both with and without the intros.

- INXS & J.D. First Concert (immediately following the finale episode)
1. "Need You Tonight"
2. "Never Tear Us Apart"
3. "Suicide Blonde"
4. "Pretty Vegas"
5. "Don't Change"
- Behind the Scenes
1. Mansion First Impressions
2. Rocker Photo Shoot
3. Backstage Vocal Warm-up
4. Rockers Get Made Up
5. Rockstar Mansion VIP Party
6. The Rockers Get Tattooed
7. Suzie Wrestles Mig
8. Backstage Tour With J.D., Marty and Mig
9. A Rocker Trip Down Memory Lane
10. Q&A With INXS, J.D. and Suzie at Star 98.7
11. J.D. Prepares For "We Are the Champions"
12. Jordis Talks About "The Man Who Sold the World"
- Extras
1. Casting Interviews
2. Photo Slideshow
3. Human Being
4. "Too Hot For TV" (Ass Cake, Piercing, Late Night Mansion Jam)

== Album ==
INXS released the album Switch following the series with J.D. Fortune on lead vocals and went on tour. Switch was released on November 29, 2005, and peaked at number 17 on the Billboard 200, and appeared on the Canadian Hot 100 and Top Internet Albums charts at numbers two and 56, respectively. The album has sold 391,000 copies in the U.S. since release. The single "Pretty Vegas" received gold certification from the Recording Industry Association of America (RIAA) on January 26, 2006. In Canada, both the album and the single, Pretty Vegas, went platinum and reached number one on the charts. The album received platinum certification in Dec. 2005 by the Canadian Recording Industry Association (CRIA), and Canadian sales of the album have exceeded 170,000 units. The album went platinum and peaked at number 18 on the ARIA Charts.

== Further seasons ==
By the end of the competition, CBS was encouraging musicians to submit audition tapes for consideration in a second Rock Star competition. Speculation on which band would be at the center of the competition varied. Van Halen and Alice in Chains were reportedly considered, but both denied the rumours. However, in March 2006, it was announced that the new season would focus on finding a lead singer for a new group entitled Supernova, featuring Mötley Crüe drummer Tommy Lee, former Metallica bassist Jason Newsted, and former Guns N' Roses guitarist Gilby Clarke. The second season of Rock Star premiered on July 5, 2006, on CBS in the United States. Once again, it was hosted by Dave Navarro and Brooke Burke.
