= J.D. Fortune =

Canadian singer and songwriter (born 1973)

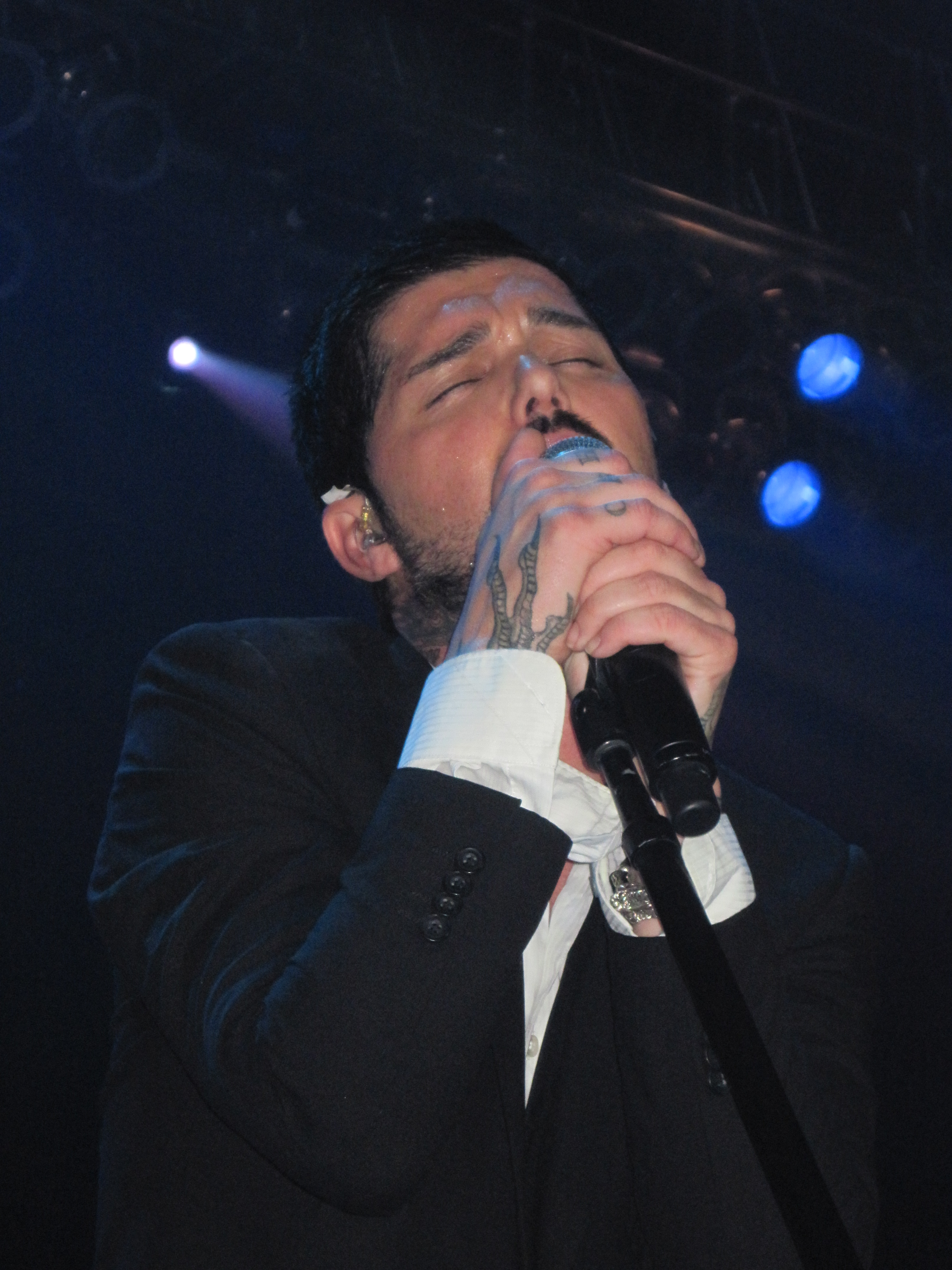
- Fortune at an INXS performance at Mystic Lake Casino, Minneapolis, Minnesota, 28 July 2011

Background information
- Born: Jason Dean Bennison; 1 September 1973 (age 53); Mississauga, Ontario, Canada
- Origin: Salt Springs, Nova Scotia, Canada
- Genres: Rock, new wave
- Occupation: Musician
- Instruments: Vocals, guitar
- Labels: Sony; Red Rebel Music
- Formerly of: INXS
- Website: jdfortune.com

Jason Dean Bennison (born 1 September 1973), better known by his stage name J.D. Fortune, is a Canadian singer and songwriter. He was the frontman of the Australian rock band INXS for six years after winning the first season of the CBS reality television series Rock Star: INXS; in 2005, replacing its late lead singer Michael Hutchence. After the show, Fortune fronted INXS through an extended 2 1/2-year world tour supporting the release of the album Switch, INXS's first studio album with Fortune, and the only album with new INXS material after Hutchence's death.

Switch also marked Fortune's only album with the band before parting ways in August 2011 due to creative differences and to work on his solo projects.

== Early life ==
J.D. Fortune was born Jason Bennison on 1 September 1973 in Mississauga, Ontario and raised in Salt Springs, Pictou County, Nova Scotia to Robert Bennison and Sandra (née Fortune). He also has a younger sister, Sarah-Jane, and had a dog named Presley (named after Elvis Presley)

Bennison's parents divorced when he was five years old and he mostly spent his earlier years with his grandparents while his mom worked shifts for a living. Bennison was his estranged father's name; he adopted his mother's maiden name upon starting his career in music.

He had his early education at Cawthra Park Secondary School and West Pictou Consolidated School but dropped out before graduating after being offered a job on a television show in Toronto, Canada.

He began to show his interest in music and performing at a very young age after finding the soundtrack for Kurt Russell's movie Elvis. He stated, “That was my video game, my TV, my everything back then, I just listened to that album all day long, every day.”

Fortune held a number of jobs before finding his way into the music industry; he worked as an extra on the Jerry O'Connell children's show My Secret Identity, worked at a martial art school as a teacher and an Elvis Presley impersonator at a local karaoke bar, and briefly worked as a truck driver. At one point he served in the Canadian army but was kicked out for drug use before completing training.

== Career ==
=== Early music career ===
Fortune performed at the Friendship Festival and at Toronto's Rogers Centre in front of 50,000 people. He also worked as an entertainer and pop songwriter for an Ontario TV show and Elvis Presley impersonator. He fronted a band named JUICe, which recorded an album named In Retrospect.

Fortune also recorded the song "Always Be in the Game" for the Beyblade V-Force: Let It Rip soundtrack and "Swing Low Let It Rip" for the Beyblade anime series.

=== Rock Star: INXS/INXS ===
Fortune was living in his car, under a bridge, when he applied for and was selected as a contestant on CBS's TV show Rock Star: INXS. On September 20, 2005, after an eleven-week televised audition process, Fortune won and joined INXS.

INXS, with Fortune, released their only album of original content with him, Switch in November 2005. Three singles from the album were released over the next twelve months including the track "Pretty Vegas" which was co-written by Fortune and INXS's Andrew Farriss, amongst others. The week of 25 February 2006, "Pretty Vegas" reached its highest charting at Number 7 on the Billboard Hot Adult Top 40 Tracks.

On 16 February 2009, Fortune revealed in an interview with Entertainment Tonight Canada that INXS fired him from the band with a handshake at a Hong Kong airport. Fortune admitted to heavy cocaine use during the latest INXS tour and acknowledged that his drug habit had likely contributed to INXS's decision. Fortune stated he had been off cocaine for the past two years; at the time, he was living out of his car and had put all his remaining money into his solo album The Death of a Motivational Speaker. Former INXS manager and now record company head Chris Murphy responded at the time by saying that Fortune had never been fired by the band, but that the band was reluctant to continue working with him because of the drug-use allegations.

However, later in 2010, Fortune performed with INXS several times. On 24 February 2010, Fortune performed with INXS at the Vancouver Olympics in a sold-out performance. On 10 July 2010, INXS, fronted by Fortune, performed at an outdoor concert for an estimated 13,000 people at the 2010 Sucrogen Townsville 400 in Townsville, Australia. On 16 July 2010, Fortune fronted INXS at an outdoor concert at the Mangrove Resort in Broome, Western Australia. On 1 September 2010, Fortune and INXS performed before 17,000 attendees of VMware's 2010 VMWorld at the Moscone Center, San Francisco. On 25 September 2010, INXS and Fortune headlined the pre-match entertainment at the AFL Grand Final Event in Melbourne, Australia. During a radio interview prior to the performance in Broome, Western Australia, Kirk Pengilly confirmed that Fortune was a permanent member of INXS.

On September 29, 2010, INXS announced an Australian tour for early 2011. The tour, with JD Fortune, included eight performances across Australia from 25 January 2011 to 12 February 2011. This was followed by three performances in South America: Buenos Aires, Argentina, Santiago, Chile and Iquique, Chile in February 2011. JD Fortune and INXS returned to Canada for a performance at the Sound Academy in Toronto Ontario on 2 March 2011.

On 19 October 2010, INXS released the single "The Stairs", featuring Fortune (the original version of "The Stairs" had appeared on INXS' 1990 album, X) on iTunes Canada. This tune was followed by the November 2010 release of an album of primarily previously released songs as performed by a number of artists. The album, Original Sin, was released in Australia and Canada. A bonus track, "Love Is" with Fortune was released in Australia through iTunes.

In 2011, INXS with Fortune completed shows in Australia, UK, Portugal, South America, Canada, and the United States. In September 2011, Fortune and INXS announced that they had mutually agreed to go their separate ways and pursue different artistic projects. Later Fortune said, "I had no idea I had left INXS the second time to be honest with you. I woke up 18 August and I had to find out from their web site, which, to this day, I still find bizarre."

=== Solo music ===
In March 2010, Fortune announced that a previously unreleased solo work, entitled "One More Day", would be used in CBS television on-air campaign for a new television series Miami Medical. The series aired on 2 April 2010. "One More Day" is a previously unreleased track from a new CD that is being worked on. In September 2011, J.D. Fortune announced that he was developing several projects as a solo artist that were on hold until he had completed his obligations with the INXS tour.

On 8 February 2011, Fortune announced via Twitter that his song "Wicked World" would begin airing in a promotion for an episode of the CBS Television program Criminal Minds.

On 10 July 2012, he played his first live performance for the public with his band Fortune. Some of the members of Fortune are fellow Canadians from the band Crush Luther. The show was at Stone Pony in Asbury Park, New Jersey.

On 4 March 2014, he began the "Seven in 7: Los Angeles" project, writing, recording, producing and releasing a new song each day for seven days and another in 2015, "Seven in 7: Ontario". Two Seven in 7 albums were released through Red Rebel Music.

On 6 January 2015, Fortune signed with manager Gerry Pass of Chrome Artists Management in Los Angeles.
