= Essex Chanel =

- Origin: Chicago, Illinois, USA
- Genres: Indie rock, folk rock, experimental rock
- Years active: 2005–present
- Label: Sweet Goodness
- Members: Travis Lee Wiggins
- Website: essexchanel.com

Essex Chanel a multi-genre musical project formed in 2005 in Chicago, Illinois by Travis Lee Wiggins.

== History ==
Wiggins started Essex Chanel to go in a different musical direction than his first band, Fetla. After Fetla went on a 2-year hiatus in 2005, Essex Chanel became Wiggins's primary project.

Most of Essex Chanel's recorded output is arranged and produced by Wiggins. Wiggins likes to experiment and use different musical styles from release-to-release, sometimes even from song-to-song. “With each album, I go in a different direction. I challenge myself,” Wiggins said in the RedEye.

In November 2010, Essex Chanel released song number 250, The Good Times. The song was played on Chicago's WXRT-FM's Local Anesthetic.

In January 2011, Essex Chanel confirmed they would be a guest on Chic-a-Go-Go.

== Musical style and influences ==
Essex Chanel is typically categorized as indie rock, indie pop, or folk pop, but due to the experimentation of Wiggins’ songwriting the music has fallen into an additional variety of music genres, including bluegrass, folk, Americana, dance/electronica, honky-tonk, alternative and classical, while still retaining mostly a pop-influenced base with an emphasis on melody, playfulness and orchestration.

Essex Chanel is most commonly compared to Ween due to a similarity in the way both bands genre-jump and use a wide array of music influences, as well as the sense of humor both groups have.

Essex Chanel's release Love is Proximity was compared to Sufjan Stevens, Arcade Fire, and The Magnetic Fields 69 Love Songs.

== Collaborators ==
Wiggins has collaborated with many musicians for Essex Chanel: Stephen Dranger, Mike Regan, Allison Trumbo, Aleksandra Lederer, Mitch Nimnicht, Steven Aleck, Robert Pleshar, Micah Travisonno, Brian Koehler, Joseph Khalifah, Luke Krause, Angelina Lucero (who had played with Pretty Good Dance Moves), & Sara Ma.

== Music videos ==
Essex Chanel broke into the national scene in 2010 with the release of a music video for the single "Skinny Dippin'." The A.V. Club said "Not many bands can pull off a song about skinny-dipping and have it sound charming instead of creepy, but Essex Chanel is schooled in all kinds of charm, filtered through frontman Travis Lee Wiggins’ vision." The video was in rotation on JBTV, MTV Latin America, Fuse TV On Demand, and at the 9:30 Club, among others.

== Discography ==
=== Albums ===
- Siren (9.8.2005)
- One Last Hurrah Before I Die (5.9.2006)
- Travis Wiggins Gets Drunk (7.21-7.24.2006)
- 67 Car Commercials (9.17.2006)
- 67 Car Commercials BONUS (3.6.2007)
- Biting the Hand that Feeds You (3.13.2007)
- Cropcircles (4.8.2007)
- Dancing at Weddings (1.18.2008)
- Love is Proximity (9.23.2009)
- Love is Proximity Sessions, Disk 1 (11.24.2009)
- Love is Proximity Sessions, Disk 2 (1.26.2010)
- Love is Proximity Sessions, Disk 3 (3.23.2010)

=== EPs ===
- Spur of the Moment (7.8.2006)
- French With Me (2.14.2011)

=== Projects ===
- January 2007 (1.1.2007-1.31.2007)
- The Album is Dead (5.5.2007)
