= The Redwalls (album) =

Studio album by The Redwalls
- Released: October 23, 2007
- Genre: Rock
- Length: 43:34
- Label: MAD Dragon UNLTD
- Producer: Tore Johansson

The Redwalls chronology
De Nova (2005)	The Redwalls (2007)

Professional ratings
Review scores
Source	Rating
Allmusic	3.5/5 stars

The Redwalls is the self-titled third album by Chicago-based rock band The Redwalls, released in the United States on October 23, 2007. The album was recorded in Sweden with producer Tore Johansson (Franz Ferdinand, The Cardigans) while under Capitol Records. Before its release Capitol merged with Virgin Records and the band was dropped. However, they retained the rights to the album and eventually signed with MAD Dragon UNLTD, an independent student collective run by Drexel University. Lead guitarist Andrew Langer called Capitol's relinquishing of the release rights "the best thing they could have ever done for us."

== Track listing ==
#	Title	Time
1	"Hangman"	3:13
2	"Modern Diet"	2:58
3	"Summer Romance"	3:24
4	"You Can't Forget Yourself"	3:39
5	"Put Us Down"	2:45
6	"Game of Love"	4:17
7	"Don't You Wanna Come Out"	2:47
8	"Into the Maelstrom"	3:35
9	"Little Sister"	5:19
10	"They Are Among Us"	3:31
11	"Each and Every Night"	3:17
12	"In the Time of the Machine"	4:26

== Chart positions ==
Chart (2007)	Peak position
U.S. Billboard Top Heatseekers (East North Central)	9
