= Winter Child =

Studio album by Matt Duke
- Released: September 12, 2006 (US)
- Recorded: 2005–2006
- Studio: Drexel University (Philadelphia, PA); Shinebox (Greenwich Village, NYC)
- Genre: Alternative Rock, singer-songwriter
- Length: 43:08
- Label: Mad Dragon
- Producer: Jim Klein, Stewart Lerman, Steuart Smith

Matt Duke chronology
XYX (2005)	Winter Child (2006)	Kingdom Underground (2008)

Professional ratings
Review scores
Source	Rating
Allmusic	3/5 stars

Winter Child is the first studio album of American singer-songwriter Matt Duke. It was released by the student-run record label Mad Dragon in the US on September 12, 2006, and distributed by Ryko Distribution.

== History ==
After the production of Mad Dragon's first compilation album, XYX, which featured Duke, Mad Dragon asked Duke sign a deal to produce a full-length album. Production for the album began thereafter and continued for the next year and a half. The original producer of the album was Jim Klein, a professor and director of the Mad Dragon program, but disagreements during production lead Duke to switch production to Stewart Lerman and Steuart Smith at the Shinebox Studio in New York. A student-produced music video was made for the song "Oysters" and the audio CD was released as an enhanced CD that featured an electronic press kit.

== Theme and lyrical content ==
Winter Child uses literary inspirations as a basis for some songs. The title track is a reference to the Ernest Hemingway short story Hills Like White Elephants and the song "Listen To Your Window" takes inspiration from John Banville.

== Track listing ==
All songs written by Matt Duke.

No.	Title	Length
1.	"Oysters"	3:57
2.	"Don't Ask (For Too Much)"	3:28
3.	"The Love We'll Never Know"	2:19
4.	"Tidal Waves"	4:05
5.	"Nausea"	3:45
6.	"One Small Bird"	3:07
7.	"Listen To Your Window"	3:15
8.	"Winter Child"	3:13
9.	"Ballroom Dancing"	3:46
10.	"Taxidermy and the Skiffle Explosion"	2:34
11.	"Yellow Lights"	4:18
12.	"To Whom It May Concern"	5:23

== Personnel ==
=== Musicians ===
- Matt Duke – Vocal, acoustics, electrics, keyboards, percussion, piano
- Steuart Smith – Acoustics, electrics, keyboards, harmonica, percussion, bass, vocals
- Stewart Lerman – Percussion, acoustics
- Steve Holley – Drums, percussion
- Rob Morsberger – String arrangements, keyboards, accordion
- David Mansfield – Violin, viola
- Debbie Assael – Cello
- Andrew Keenan – Pedal steel
- Jim Klein – Piano on "Nausea," producer on "When the Bough Breaks"
- Gretchen Witt – Vocals on "Ballroom Dancing"

=== Production ===
- Stewart Lerman – Production (Tracks 1, 2, 3, 4, 5, 6, 7, 8, 9, 10, 11), mixer
- Steuart Smith – Production (Tracks 1, 3, 4, 6, 7, 8, 9, 11)
- Jim Klein – Production (Tracks 2, 5, 10, 12)
- Greg Calbi – Mastering
- Michael Pierce – Artwork concept and design
- Matt Duke – Illustrations
- Stephanie Pistel – Photography
