= Heavy Meta =

Heavy Meta may refer to:

- Heavy Meta (Nekrogoblikon album), 2015
- Heavy Meta (Ron Gallo album), 2017
