= Acoustic Kingdom Underground =

EP by Matt Duke
- Released: June 30, 2009 (US)
- Recorded: February 2009; Pyramid Recording, NYC
- Genre: Alternative Rock, singer-songwriter, acoustic
- Length: 23:44
- Label: Rykodisc
- Producer: Jason Finkel

Matt Duke EP chronology
Acoustic Kingdom Underground (2009)	TFDI (2009)

Acoustic Kingdom Underground is the first EP of singer-songwriter Matt Duke and his second offering from Rykodisc. It was released in the US on June 30, 2009.

== History ==
Months after the tour and release of Kingdom Underground, Ryko asked Duke to record a supplemental EP of acoustic tracks to the Kingdom Underground album that was called Acoustic Kingdom Underground. This was to match the feel and sound of Duke's live shows, as he was touring solo without a band. The producer of that EP, Jason Finkel, would later become the producer of Duke's next full-length release, One Day Die.

All of the songs from the album come from the release of Kingdom Underground with the exception of "Ash Like Snow", a song that had been written years earlier.

== Track listing ==
All songs written by Matt Duke, except for "The Father, The Son and The Harlot's Ghost" and "Walk It Off" which are written by Matt Duke/Marshall Altman.

No.	Title	Length
1.	"Kingdom Underground [Acoustic Version]"	4:30
2.	"The Father, The Son and the Harlot's Ghost [Acoustic Version]"	4:31
3.	"Walk It Off [Acoustic Version]"	3:34
4.	"Sex And Reruns [Acoustic Version]"	3:29
5.	"Ash Like Snow [Acoustic Version]"	4:43
6.	"Rabbit [Acoustic Version]"	2:57

== Personnel ==
=== Musicians ===
- Matt Duke: Vocals, Acoustic Guitar

=== Production ===
- Jason Finkel: Producer, Engineer, Mixer
- Kevin Blackler: Masterer
- Doug Seymour: Photography
- Jamie Hoyt-Vitale: Design
