= Antoinette Westphal College of Media Arts and Design =

College of Drexel University

Antoinette Westphal College of Media Arts & Design
- Parent institution: Drexel University
- Dean: Debra Ruben (interim)
- Location: Philadelphia, Pennsylvania, USA
- Campus: University City Campus
- Website: www.drexel.edu/westphal/

The Antoinette Westphal College of Media Arts & Design, formerly the Nesbitt College of Design Arts, is one of the colleges of Drexel University. In 2005, the college was renamed after alumna Antoinette Passo Westphal at the request of her husband after one of the largest private donations to the university in its history.

The college is the home to the Mandell Theater, the Pearlstein Gallery, Drexel's television station (DUTV), the Kal Rudman Institute for Entertainment Industry Studies, MAD Dragon Records and Drexel's Robert & Penny Fox Historic Costume Collection.

== History ==
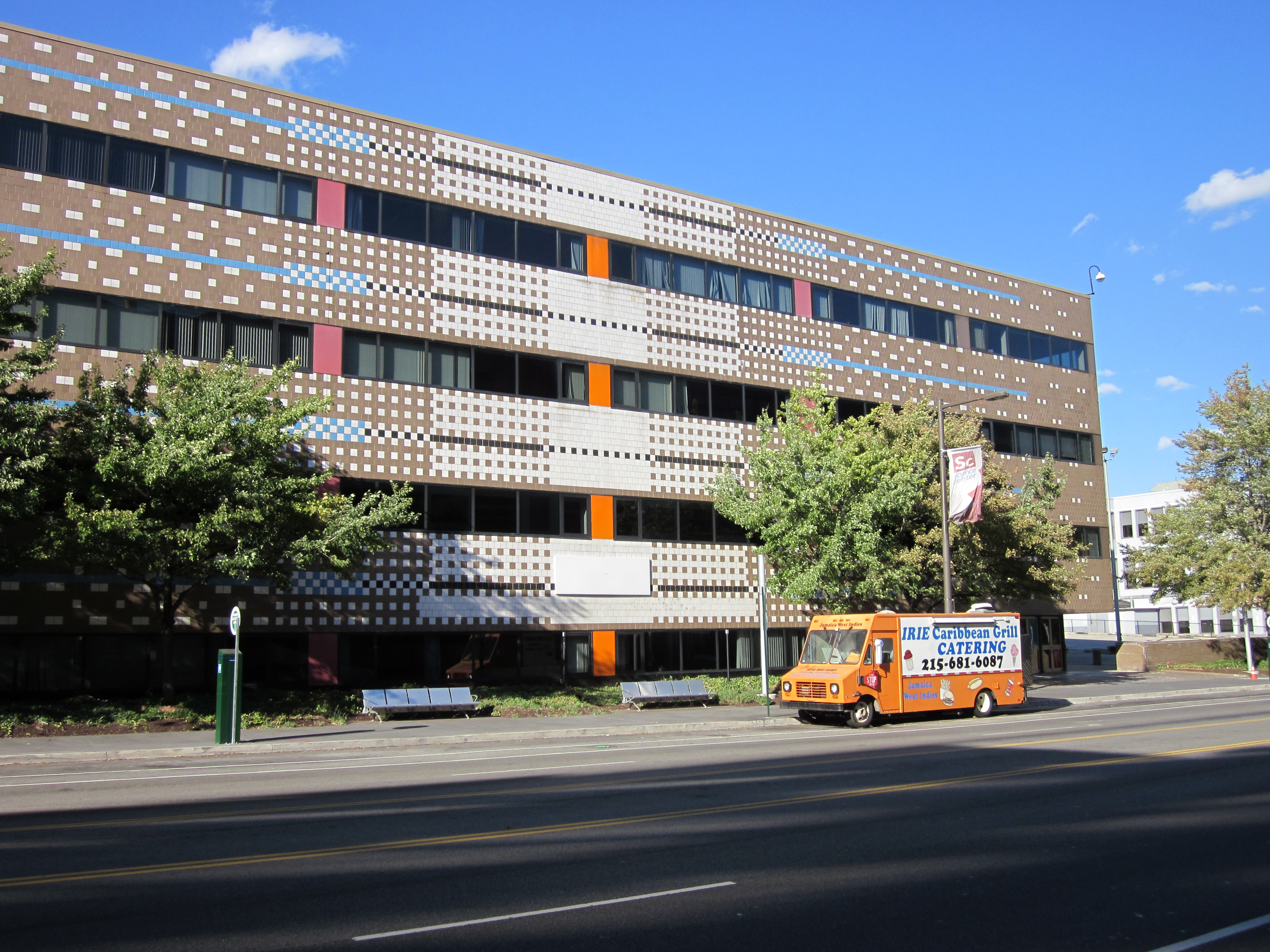
Drexel URBN Center, home of the Westphal College of Media Arts & Design

The college was originally created within the Drexel Institute as the Department of Domestic Economy in 1891. Throughout its existence it has been known as the School of Domestic Science and Arts, the College of Home Economics, the Nesbitt College of Design, Nutrition, Human Behavior, and Home Economics, and the College of Media Arts and Design. In 2005 it was renamed the Antoinette Westphal College of Media Arts and Design after alumnae Antoinette Passo Westphal.

In January 2009, the Westphal College received the largest public philanthropic gift ever recorded at Drexel University, $25 million. The gift is being used for the development and expansion of the college, purchasing a 130,000 sq ft (12,000 m^{2}) building from the Institute of Scientific Information. The building was converted into the home for Westphal's design classes.

== Academics ==
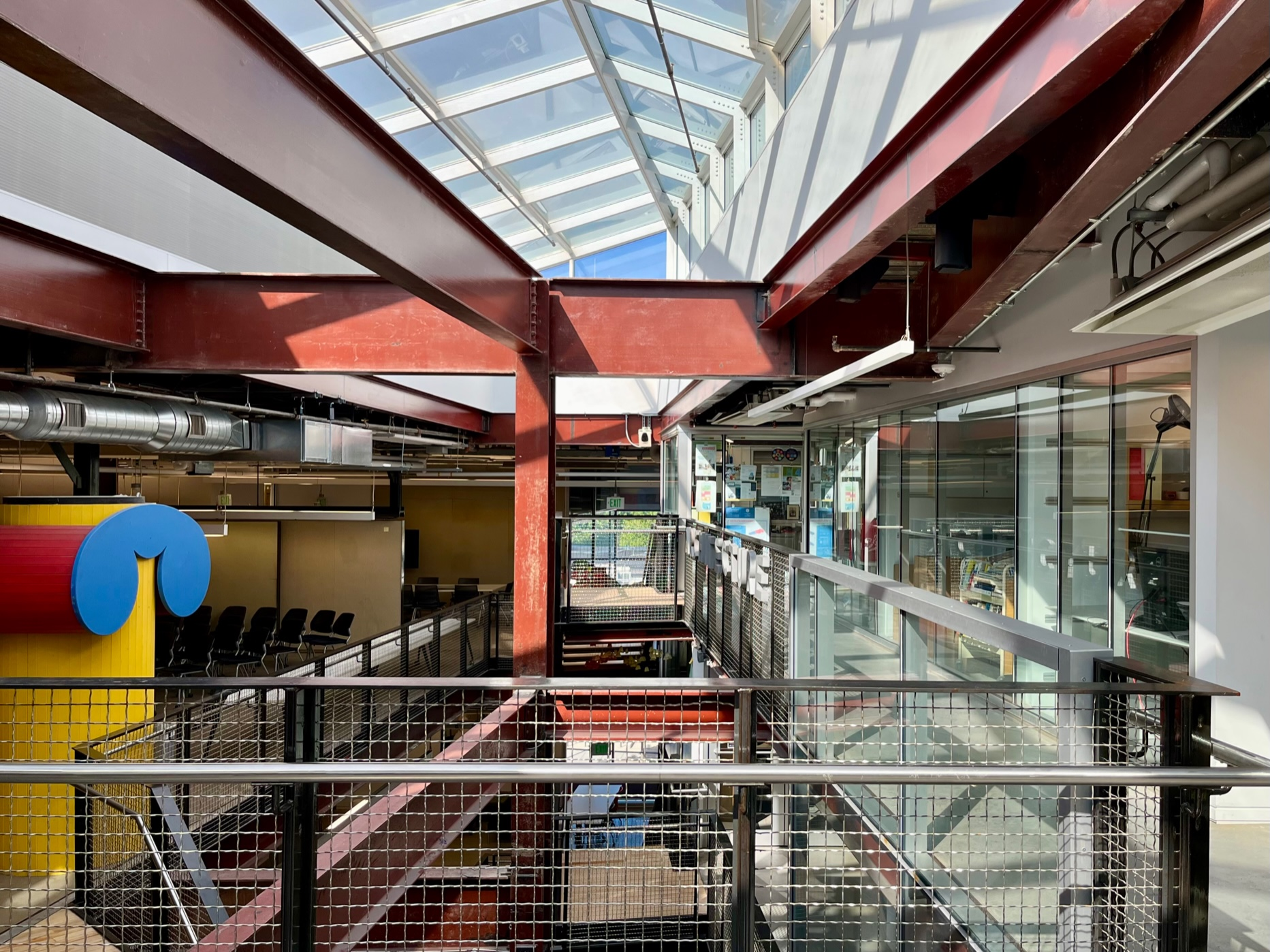
The top floor of Drexel's URBN Center (as seen in 2022)

The college offers eighteen undergraduate and nine graduate programs in media, design and the performing arts. Like other programs of study at Drexel, the Antoinette Westphal College offers students the ability to go out on co-op tailored to the college's area of study. Additionally AWCoMAD offers summer programs to high school students involving one of 12 areas of study: Architecture, Dance, Design & Merchandising, Fashion Design, Film & Television, Graphic Design, Industrial Design & Making, Interior Design, Music Industry, and Photography.

In January 2010, the college launched its 14th undergraduate program in Product Design and seated its first class in fall 2010. This was followed by the launch of three separate programs in Digital Media in June 2010. The original Digital Media program was split into Animation & Visual Effects, Game Art & Production and Interactive Digital Media.

=== Programs of study ===
==== Undergraduate ====
- Animations & Visual Effects
- Architecture (B.Arch)
- Architectural Studies (B.S.)
- Art History
- Dance
- Design & Merchandising
- Digital Media & Virtual Production
- Entertainment & Arts Management
- Fashion Design
- Film & Television
- Game Design & Production
- Graphic Design
- User Experience & Interaction Design
- Interior Design
- Music Industry
- Photography
- Product Design
- Screenwriting & Playwriting
- Undeclared: Media or Undeclared: Design

==== Graduate ====
- Arts Administration & Museum Leadership (also an on-line degree program)
- Design Research
- Digital Media
- Fashion Design
- Interior Architecture & Design
- Retail & Merchandising
- Television & Media Management
- Urban Strategy

=== Rankings ===
DesignIntelligence, a journal published by the Design Futures Council, in 2009 ranked Drexel University's Interior Design programs among the top ten in the nation. The undergraduate Interior Design program is now ranked 13th in the nation.

The joint Computer Science (College of Engineering) and Digital Media (Antoinette Westphal College of Media Arts & Design) gaming program ranked No. 7 among the "Top Undergraduate Schools for Video Game Design Study for 2011" and No. 5 among the top graduate schools (Princeton Review)

Fashionista.com ranked Drexel fashion 8th in the U.S. and 16th best in the world and Drexel Design & Merchandising as 3rd best in the U.S.

AWCoMAD's Entertainment & Arts Management Program was ranked 14th best Bachelor's Entertainment Management Degree in the U.S. by BestCollegeReviews.org.

Drexel Graphic Design received "Highest Honors" among the top design schools by Graphic Design USA (GDUSA).

Drexel Product Design is ranked 14th in the U.S. by College Values Online

==== Awards ====
DUTV, Drexel University's student-run and faculty supervised television station broadcast in metropolitan Philadelphia on Comcast and Fios, won a 2011 Telly award for DNews, a monthly news magazine devoted to all-things Drexel.

The Mandell Professionals in Residence Project, a project that brings professional theatre companies to the campus for a term of instruction and performance, has been nominated for six Barrymore awards and won a Barrymore for 2009's Long Christmas Ride Home with Azuka Theatre. The Barrymore Awards are Philadelphia's version of the Tony Awards.

In 2010, CMJ named WKDU 91.7 FM, Drexel's student-run radio station, college station of the year and champion of the local scene.

The graphic design program has won more than 130 industry awards since September 2009, including three students to Watch in Graphic Design USA.

MAD Dragon Records, the student-run record label that is part of the Music Industry program, has been named college label of the year twice by the Independent Music Awards (2007, 2008). In 2010, the label was beaten out for label of the year by Be Frank Records, a record label owned and operated by two students of the music industry program. MAD Dragon Records is distributed by ADA, a subsidiary of Warners Music, and has released more than 15 albums under Sabinson's tenure. The Redwalls, a MAD Dragon recording act, appeared on The Tonight Show with Jay Leno and Late Night with David Letterman.

An Antoinette Westphal College of Media Arts & Design student was the first American to win the 2005 International Competition for Young Fashion Designers in Paris, France. In 2009, Fashion graduate student Milka Osoro became the second Drexel student to win the grand prize at the Arts of Fashion symposium and competition.

In 2007 the college's brochure, designed by its students, won the Graphic Arts Association Franklin Award for Excellence. In addition to the fashion and graphic design awards, MAD Dragon Records, the record label run through the college, has won several Independent Music Awards throughout its history.

== Sources ==
- Antoinette Westphal College of Media Arts and Design
