= Foreground Music =

Studio album by Ron Gallo
- Released: March 3, 2023
- Recorded: 2022
- Genre: Psychedelic rock; garage punk
- Length: 34:43
- Label: Kill Rock Stars
- Producer: Ron Gallo

Ron Gallo chronology
Peacemeal (2021)	Foreground Music (2023)

Singles from Foreground Music
- 1. "Entitled Man" Released: September 6, 2022; 2. "Anything But This" Released: October 11, 2022; 3. "Foreground Music" Released: November 15, 2022; 4. "Yucca Valley Marshalls" Released: December 15, 2022; 5. "At Least I'm Dancing" Released: January 17, 2023

Foreground Music is the fifth solo studio album by Ron Gallo, released on March 3, 2023, through Kill Rock Stars.

== Background and recording ==
Ron Gallo described the album as "what would an existential crisis be like if it was fun".

== Critical reception ==
Professional ratings
Review scores
Source	Rating
Mojo	4/5 stars
Uncut	7/10

In a positive review for Mojo, James McNair called Foreground Music a "garagey art-rock and fractured funk" album and further said that "the New Jersey-born Gallo brings fizzing zeal and a bounteous grab-bag of ideas, his songs' hooks as striking as his idiosyncratic lyrics". McNair gave Foreground Music a four star rating. Peter Watts, writing for Uncut magazine gave the album a 7 out of 10 rating. Watts praised the eclectic mix of sounds on the album but said Gallo was at his best when "occupying a place between the rawness of Jack White and lysergic drawl of Kevin Morby"

== Track listing ==
No.	Title	Length
1.	"Entitled Man"	2:25
2.	"Foreground Music"	3:11
3.	"At Least I'm Dancing"	2:53
4.	"Vanity March"	4:04
5.	"Yucca Valley Marshalls"	3:43
6.	"San Benedetto"	3:06
7.	"Can My Flowers Even Grow Here?"	3:23
8.	"Big Truck Energy"	3:56
9.	"Life Is a Privilege? (Interlude)"	1:29
10.	"Anything But This"	2:43
11.	"I Love Someone Buried Deep Inside of You"	3:44
Total length:		34:43
