= Really Nice Guys =

EP by Ron Gallo
- Released: January 19, 2018
- Genres: Indie rock, comedy rock
- Length: 22:36
- Label: New West
- Producer: Ron Gallo

Ron Gallo chronology
Heavy Meta (2017)	Really Nice Guys (2018)	Stardust Birthday Party (2018)

Professional ratings
Review scores
Source	Rating
Music Connection	9/10 stars

Really Nice Guys is an extended play by Philadelphian musician, Ron Gallo. The album was released on January 19, 2018, through New West Records.

== Track listing ==
All tracks are written by Ron Gallo, except where noted.

No.	Title	Length
1.	"Rough Mix"	1:39
2.	"Really Nice Guys"	2:08
3.	"Related Artists (For Fans Of...)" (Ron Gallo, Dylan Sevey and Joe Bisirri)	0:56
4.	"I'm on the Guestlist"	3:57
5.	"YouTubular"	3:31
6.	"The East Nashville Kroger Conversation"	2:41
7.	"Emotional Impact For Sale"	4:08
8.	"Pull Quote (Feat. Jerry)"	3:36
Total length:		22:36
