= Kingdom Underground =

Second album by Matt Duke

Studio album by Matt Duke
- Released: September 22, 2008 (US)
- Recorded: January 2008 at: The Galt Line (Burbank, California)
- Genre: Alternative rock, singer-songwriter
- Length: 42:53
- Label: Rykodisc
- Producer: Marshall Altman

Matt Duke chronology
Winter Child (2006)	Kingdom Underground (2008)	One Day Die (2011)

Singles from Kingdom Underground
- 1. "The Father, The Son and The Harlot's Ghost" Released: 2008

Kingdom Underground is the second studio album of singer-songwriter Matt Duke and his first major-label record. It was released by Rykodisc in the US on September 22, 2008, and featured the single "The Father, The Son and The Harlot's Ghost".

== History ==
Duke had recorded the album Winter Child on the student-run record label Mad Dragon at Drexel University when Rykodisc started to work with Mad Dragon and other student-run record labels across the country to distribute their albums with Ryko Distribution. It was from this union that Rykodisc became aware of Matt Duke and had asked him to sign with Ryko after the release of Winter Child.

With Duke now signed to Ryko, Ryko played a demo of the song "I've Got Atrophy on the Brain" to producer Marshall Altman to see if he'd have interest in handling production for Duke's next record. Altman agreed to spend a few days with Duke in Los Angeles to see if they'd be able to work together. After the meeting in Los Angeles, both Duke and Altman agreed to work together for the next album. Duke flew back home and began writing and compiling songs to record for the new album over the next few months. With the songs written, Duke flew to Burbank, California to spend the next four weeks recording the songs at The Galt Line recording studio. Songs were recorded with the acoustic guitar while Duke and Altman worked with engineer Eric Robinson. A live band was brought in to play over the acoustic guitar tracks for the final tracks.

The lead-off single for the record was "The Father, The Son and The Harlot's Ghost" but no music video was recorded. The follow-up single would have been "Sex & Reruns" but it was never followed through. Months after the release, Ryko asked Duke to record a supplemental EP of acoustic versions of songs from Kingdom Underground, which ultimately became Acoustic Kingdom Underground.

== Theme and lyrical content ==
Duke as an artist uses themes and lyrics that can focus on literary references and his religious Irish Catholic upbringing. The song "Rabbit" is based on the John Updike Rabbit series of novels, "The Father, The Son and The Harlot's Ghost" is based on the novel Trinity by Leon Uris, while "Ash Like Snow" is based on Ayn Rand's We the Living. "Kingdom Underground," the hidden title track on the album, is a song based on the Creation and Adam & Eve from Satan's perspective. The album Kingdom Underground was to be a concept album based on the John Milton poem Paradise Lost, before being abandoned to become a standard album.

== Track listing ==
All songs written by Matt Duke, except for "The Father, The Son and The Harlot's Ghost" and "Walk It Off" which are written by Matt Duke/Marshall Altman.

No.	Title	Length
1.	"The Father, The Son and The Harlot's Ghost"	4:28
2.	"Sex and Reruns"	3:39
3.	"30 Some Days"	3:24
4.	"I've Got Atrophy On the Brain"	4:32
5.	"Rabbit"	3:01
6.	"Opossum"	3:57
7.	"A Happy Hooligan"	3:04
8.	"Rose"	3:50
9.	"Walk It Off"	3:59
10.	"Split Milk"	4:15
11.	"Kingdom Underground [hidden track]"	4:44

== Personnel ==
=== Musicians ===
- Matt Duke: vocals, acoustic guitar, tack piano, toy piano
- Michael Chaves: electric guitar, keyboards (Rabbit)
- iZler: electric guitar
- Jim McGorman: piano, Wurlitzer
- Aaron Sterling: drums
- Jonathan Ahrens: bass
- Eric Robinson: Hammond organ, programming
- Marshall Altman: backing vocals, programming, keyboards

=== Production ===
- Marshall Altman: Producer, Arranger, Recorder
- Eric Robinson: Recorder, Mixer
- Gene Grimaldi: Masterer
- George Bates: Illustration, Type, Design
- Bo Streeter: Photography
- Jamie Silvers: Management
