= Matt Duke (musician) =

American musician and singer-songwriter

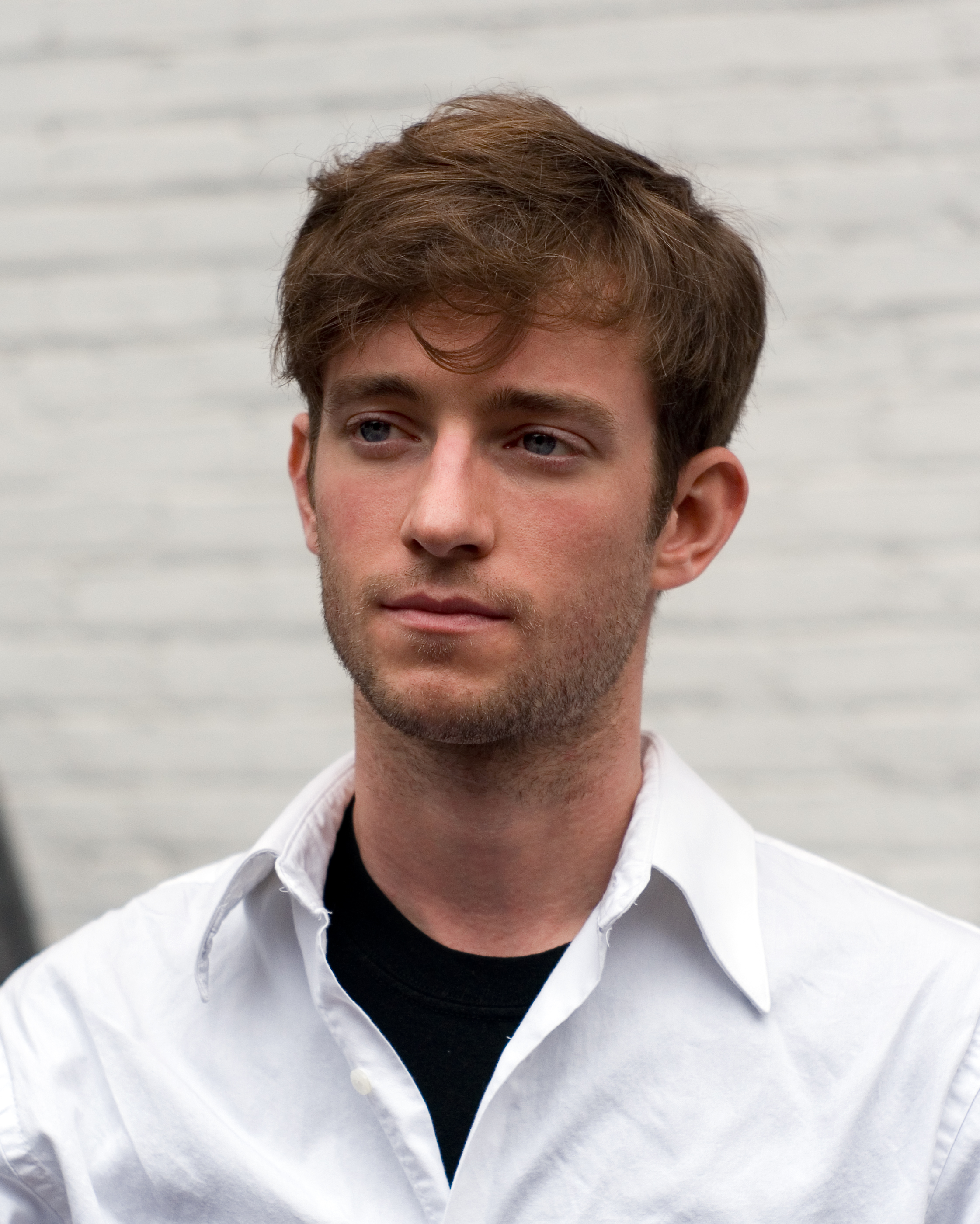

Background information
- Born: Matthew Thomas Duke; January 20, 1985 (age 41); Reston, Virginia, U.S.
- Origin: Mount Laurel Township, New Jersey, U.S.
- Genres: Alternative rock, acoustic, singer-songwriter
- Occupations: Musician, singer-songwriter
- Instruments: Vocals, guitar
- Years active: 2003–present
- Labels: MAD Dragon Records, Rykodisc
- Formerly of: TFDI

Matthew Thomas Duke (born January 20, 1985) is an American musician and singer-songwriter who was born in Reston, Virginia and raised in Mount Laurel Township, New Jersey. He released an independent album, Winter Child, through the student-run MAD Dragon Records at Drexel University in Philadelphia. Later he signed to the major label Rykodisc and has since released multiple albums: two full-length albums: Kingdom Underground and One Day Die, and two EPs.

== Early life ==
Duke was born in Reston, Virginia to Thomas, a contracts negotiator, and Angela, a teacher. Matt Duke is of Irish, Italian and Polish descent, and had a religious Roman Catholic upbringing. He lived in Reston until the age of 5, when his family moved to Mount Laurel Township, New Jersey, where he lived until adulthood. Growing up in South Jersey he attended the Our Lady of Good Counsel parish grade school until 8th grade, and then Saint Joseph's Preparatory School in Philadelphia for high school.

As a child and teenager, he performed in local theatre productions through school and community programs. In his late teens and early 20s he worked a variety of jobs including: sandwich-maker, framer, gardener and construction worker.

== Career ==
=== Early career ===
As a child Duke played the piano at the behest of his mother. He then quit playing and picked up guitar at the age of 13. The guitar was his mother's '70s Penco and she left him to teach himself, after he had quit playing piano she said she would not pay for lessons lest he quit again. The next three years Duke spent learning to play the guitar, from internet tablature and playing along with the radio to bands like Alice in Chains and Nirvana. By the time that he was sixteen he started to play live shows at a local coffeehouse in Collingswood, New Jersey, "The Living Room", doing a mixture of original material and cover songs. He performed at open-mic nights at The Point in Bryn Mawr, PA. For his 18th birthday his family gave him a present of recording time to record the songs he had written for posterity. Duke and a friend recorded six songs in two hours at his church, and CD copies ended up being passed around to friends and family.

=== MAD Dragon: XYX & Winter Child ===
One of the CDs ended up in the hands of his friend who was a student at the newly formed MAD Dragon Records, which is a student-run record label operating out of Drexel University. The CD was played in an A&R class at MAD Dragon, headed by Marcy Rauer Wagman (then a professor at Drexel, and the creator and head of MAD Dragon's family of entities), which then led to MAD Dragon Records asking Duke to sign a one-year promotional deal with them, with the intent of using students for all aspects of the process like recording and promotion. Duke, Julia Othmer and Trisha O'Keefe were asked to contribute songs to a compilation record, which became XYX. XYX was the first CD released by MAD Dragon Records and featured four songs from each artist, with O'Keefe and Duke using the Drexel recording studios in the fall of 2004. Jim Klein, a professor at Drexel and part of the MAD Dragon program, handled production for Duke's part of the album. Duke, O'Keefe and Othmer supported the album with a small tour around Northeast which was booked by the students through the student-run Drako Booking Agency, part of the MAD Dragon enterprise.

After the tour was over, MAD Dragon wanted Duke to sign a recording artist deal to produce a full-length album. Winter Child, the next album released by Duke, was recorded on-and-off over the next year. "Winter Child" was primarily recorded in a New York studio with Stewart Lerman and Steuart Smith. Jim Klein contributed several tracks as well. During the making of Winter Child, Marcy Rauer Wagman arranged a meeting between MAD Dragon and Ryko Distribution; as a result, Ryko Distribution became interested in distributing content from MAD Dragon Records and other student-run record labels. This deal lead to Ryko Distribution distributing the Winter Child record. A student-made music video for the song "Oysters" was also made and the song was treated as the single from the album.

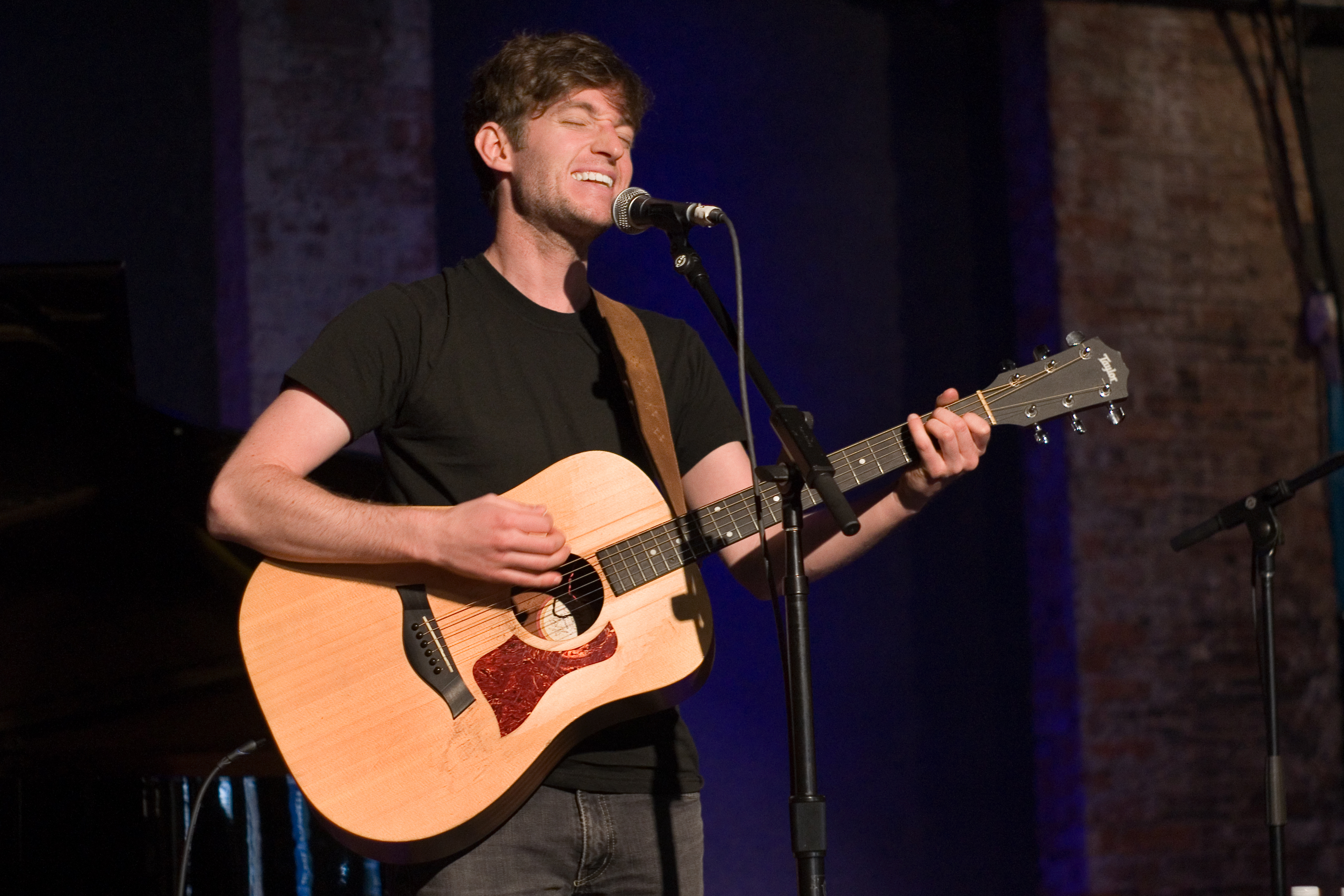
Matt Duke performing at the City Winery in NYC on April 28, 2011

=== Kingdom Underground, Acoustic Kingdom Underground and TFDI ===
After the release and tour to promote the album, Ryko took interest in Duke and asked him to sign a record deal with them, to produce the full-length album that would become Kingdom Underground. Using a demo of the song "I've Got Atrophy on the Brain" that was recorded with students at Drexel, Ryko got the interest of producer Marshall Altman and Altman agreed to meet Duke in Los Angeles to see how the two would work. After the meeting in Los Angeles, Duke and Altman agreed to work, leaving Duke to head back to Philadelphia to prepare and write songs for the release. With the songs written, Duke traveled to Burbank, California to record with Altman and finished the production of the album in just four weeks. Kingdom Underground was released later that year on September 23, 2008.

Months after the tour and release of Kingdom Underground Ryko asked Duke to record a supplemental EP of acoustic tracks to the Kingdom Underground album, called Acoustic Kingdom Underground. This was to match the feel and sound of Duke's live shows, as he was touring solo without a band. The producer of that EP, Jason Finkel, would later become the producer of Duke's next full-length release. After recording Acoustic Kingdom Underground, Duke was invited to be the opener for a co-headlining tour featuring Jay Nash and Tony Lucca. During this time the three became friends and recorded an impromptu collection of songs during the tour at a studio in Evanston, Illinois, calling the collaboration TFDI, they released these songs as an EP with the same name.

=== One Day Die ===
Following the tour with Jay Nash and Tony Lucca, Duke returned home and began to focus on his next full-length album, One Day Die. Duke asked Finkel, who had produced his acoustic EP, to be the producer for this album and the two began work in September 2009 on material. The album was then pushed back indefinitely, when, on November 1 of that same year, Duke suffered a hand injury in an accident, breaking two bones near his pinkie on his right hand. Duke was unable to play the guitar after the surgery and during his rehabilitation, but he worked on writing during his downtime, and was successfully able to play guitar again a few months later. Well enough to play, production for the album began again, and the direction of the album changed as a result of the accident. The album was released on March 29, 2011, two and a half years later than Kingdom Underground.

== Style ==
Duke has said that his musical styling has been influenced by the likes of '90s grunge and rock bands like Pearl Jam, Alice in Chains, Soundgarden and Nirvana. Other influences include Ani DiFranco and Conor Oberst. He tours primarily as a solo act, with just an acoustic guitar for accompaniment.

As a songwriter, Duke's lyrical influences greatly refer to his religious upbringing and literary references, with many songs either directly based on novels, literary characters and/or religion. The track from Kingdom Underground's "Rabbit" is based on the John Updike Rabbit series of novels, for example. Other songs are based or reference such works as Ayn Rand, Don DeLillo, John Milton and Leon Uris. References to religion can be seen in songs like "The Father, The Son and The Harlot's Ghost" and the title track to Kingdom Underground, which is a song about the story of Adam & Eve through the perspective of Satan.

== Discography ==
- Floating Mass Demo/The Major Joke EP (2003)
- XYX (2005)
- Winter Child (2006)
- Kingdom Underground (2008)
- Acoustic Kingdom Underground (2009)
- TFDI (2009)
- One Day Die (2011)
- Love on a Major Scale EP (2013)
- singer/songwriter (2014)
- The Phoenix (2016)
