= Canyon Songs =

Studio album by Tony Lucca
- Released: August 8, 2006
- Recorded: Canyons of Hollywood Hills
- Genre: Rock
- Length: 39:05
- Label: Rock Ridge Music

Tony Lucca chronology
Shotgun (2004)	Canyon Songs (2006)	Come Around Again (2008)

Professional ratings
Review scores
Source	Rating
Allmusic	4.5/5 stars

Canyon Songs is the fourth full-length studio album by Tony Lucca released on August 8, 2006.

== Album information ==
This album marks the second album Lucca released with his record label, Rock Ridge Music. The album was almost entirely written and recorded by Tony Lucca in the canyons of the Hollywood Hills.

== Track listing ==
All songs written by Tony Lucca, except "Sarah Jane", co-written by Cole Garlak.

1. "Death Of Me" – 2:58
2. "Darlin' I" – 3:50
3. "Longing" – 3:18
4. "Sarah Jane" – 3:49
5. "The Hustler, The Widow, And The Boy From Detroit" – 4:00
6. "Songbird" – 4:41
7. "So Long" – 4:50
8. "Julia" – 3:44
9. "Feels Like Love" – 3:19
10. "Around The Bend" – 4:36

== Personnel ==
- Stevie Blacke – Violin, Cello
- Russell Cook – Engineer, Mixing
- Brandy Flower – Design
- Robin Giles – Vocals (background)
- Chasen Hampton – Vocals
- Tim Hatfield – Producer, Engineer, Overdubs, Mixing, (Sara Jane)
- Tim Jones – Vocals (background)
- Josh Kelley – Engineer, Shaker
- Ann Klein – Pedal Steel, Guitar (Electric)
- Tony Lucca – Guitar (Acoustic), Bass, Guitar (Electric), Vocals, Vocals (background), Producer, Guitar (Classical), Shaker, Wurlitzer
- Ben Peeler – Pedal Steel
- Dan Shike – Mastering
- Todd Sickafoose – Bass
- Jason Spiewak – A&R
- Mike Vizcarra – The man who now sits next to the right of God
- C.C. White – Vocals (background)
- Brian Wright – Mandolin
- Dave Yaden – Organ, Piano
