= De Nova =

Studio album by The Redwalls
- Released: June 21, 2005
- Genre: Rock
- Length: 48:52
- Label: Capitol
- Producer: Rob Schnapf

The Redwalls chronology
Universal Blues (2003)	De Nova (2005)	The Redwalls (2007)

Professional ratings
Review scores
Source	Rating
Allmusic	4/5 stars
Blender	3/5 stars
Q	3/5 stars
Rolling Stone	2/5 stars

De Nova is the second album by Chicago-based rock band The Redwalls, released in the United States on June 21, 2005 through Capitol Records. Produced by Rob Schnapf (Elliott Smith, The Vines), De Nova was the first album the band released on Capitol since initially signing with the label in 2003. "It's Alright" was featured on an episode of the HBO Original Series Entourage.

== Track listing ==
#	Title	Composer(s)	Time
1	"Robinson Crusoe"	Baren, J./Baren, L./Langer, A.	3:44
2	"Falling Down"	Baren, J./Baren, L./Langer, A.	3:44
3	"Thank You"	Baren, J./Baren, L./Langer, A.	4:19
4	"Love Her"	Baren, J./Baren, L./Langer, A.	3:42
5	"Build a Bridge"	Baren, J./Baren, L./Langer, A.	3:15
6	"Hung Up on the Way I'm Feeling"	Baren, J./Baren, L./Langer, A.	3:44
7	"On My Way"	Baren, J./Baren, L./Langer, A.	3:14
8	"It's Alright"	Baren, J./Baren, L./Langer, A.	3:03
9	"Front Page"	Baren, J./Baren, L./Langer, A.	5:54
10	"How the Story Goes"	Baren, J./Baren, L./Langer, A.	4:03
11	"Back Together"	Baren, J./Baren, L./Langer, A.	4:13
12	"Glory of War"	Baren, J./Baren, L./Langer, A.	3:59
13	"Rock & Roll"	Baren, J./Baren, L./Langer, A.	1:58

== Chart positions ==
Chart (2005)	Peak position
U.S. Billboard Top Heatseekers (East North Central)	3

== Personnel ==
- Justin Baren – Group Member
- Logan Baren – Group Member
- Ben Greeno – Group Member
- Andrew Langer – Group Member
- Jeff Turmes – Saxophones
- Doug Boehm – Engineer
- Ted Jensen – Mastering
- Eric Roinestad – Art Direction, Design
- Rob Schnapf – Producer, Mixing, Musician
- Anita Kornick – A&R
- Julian Raymond – A&R
- Daniel Gabbay – Photography
- Adam Roehlke – Photography
- Jonathan "JP" Parker – Photography
- The Cobrasnake – Photography
- Mary Fagot – Photography, Creative Director
