= One Day Die =

Studio album by Matt Duke
- Released: March 29, 2011 (US)
- Recorded: 2009–2010; Recording; Secret Garden; Mission Studios; Pyramid Studios; Mixing; Studio 4A; Mastering; Sterling Studios
- Genre: Alternative rock, singer-songwriter
- Length: 42:53
- Label: Rykodisc
- Producer: Jason Finkel

Matt Duke chronology
Kingdom Underground (2008)	One Day Die (2011)

Singles from One Day Die
- 1. "Needle and Thread" Released: January 18, 2011

One Day Die is the third studio album of singer-songwriter Matt Duke and his second major-label record. It was released by Rykodisc in the US on March 29, 2011, and featured the single "Needle and Thread".

== Background ==
Following a tour and collaboration with Jay Nash and Tony Lucca that resulted in the EP TFDI, Duke began assembling material for his next full-length album. He enlisted producer Jason Finkel, who had been the producer of the Acoustic Kingdom Underground EP that he had recorded earlier that year, to help lead the album. Duke and Finkel began pre-production in September 2009, working on songs such as "Seriously, Indulge Me" and "Needle and Thread." However, production for the album was stopped indefinitely when Duke broke his right hand in an accident in November. Unable to play guitar, Duke spent the next four months tending and rehabbing his hand, while also focusing on writing. The inability to play guitar and time off lead Duke to rethink his album and when it was determined that he'd be able to play again, he went into the studio with a changed direction for the album. Recording continued in February and mixing was finished around August 2010. The single "Needle and Thread" was released on January 18, 2011 while the album was released on March 29, two and a half years after Kingdom Underground was released.

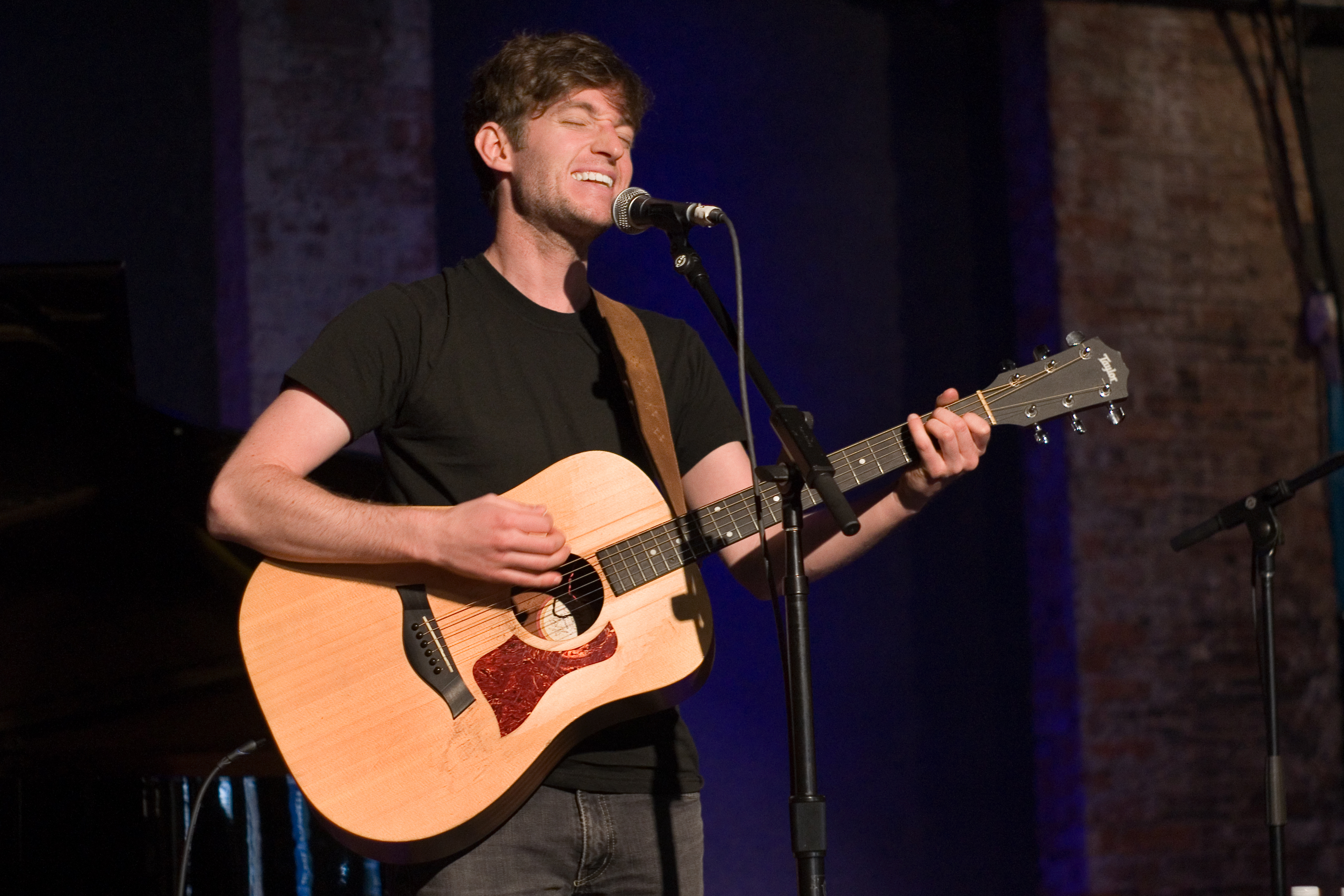
Matt Duke performing at the City Winery in NYC on April 28, 2011, to help promote the album

== Songs and themes ==
While the previous albums Winter Child and Kingdom Underground could be described as records built around others, meaning songs were interpretations of people and events as seen through Duke, One Day Die was about Duke himself. Duke said that the time of not being able to play because of his hand injury caused him to turn inward and reexamine events from his life, which provided much of the material for the record. Previously written songs were reworked and new songs were created when Duke returned to the studio. A total of 14 songs were recorded for the album, but three were cut before the album was mastered. The three cut songs included: "Slip and Fall," which appeared as an acoustic song on the iTunes single release of "Needle and Thread;" "Dead Meat" which was described as a rock blues song; and an unnamed cover of a Nine Inch Nails song.

During a live show at the City Winery in New York City on April 28, 2011, Duke talked about the song inspiration for "The Hour" which contains the lyrics "One Day Die," that later became the title of the album. Duke said that the song is primarily about his mother coping with the death of a close friend and next-door neighbor, and is the first song that he had written for his mother.

== Track listing ==
All songs written by Matt Duke

No.	Title	Length
1.	"M.L.T."	3:59
2.	"Kangaroo Court"	2:46
3.	"Love You Anymore (Featuring Cara Salimando)"	3:44
4.	"Needle and Thread"	3:13
5.	"Lay"	2:47
6.	"The Hour"	2:45
7.	"The Bench On the Hill and Tom Ramblewood"	4:45
8.	"Psycho-Babble"	2:35
9.	"Seriously, Indulge Me"	3:10
10.	"Shangri-La"	2:56
11.	"Abandoned"	3:44
Total length:		42:53

== Personnel ==
=== Musicians ===
- Matt Duke: Vocals, Guitars, Keyboards, Percussion
- Geoff Kraly: Bass
- Carter McLean: Drums, Percussions
- Jason Spiewak: Piano on "Love You Anymore" and "Abandoned"
- Cara Salimando: Vocal on "Love You Anymore"

=== Production ===
- Jason Finkel: Producer, Engineer, Arranger, Mixer
- Justin Shturtz: Masterer
- Jerrod Landon Porter: Layout and design
- Gary French: Cover illustration
- Anna White: Photography
- Jason Spiewak: Management
- Marcie Jacobson: Management
- Tom Derr: Management
- Ruby Marchand: A&R
