= The Swimmers (band) =

American rock band

- Origin: Philadelphia, Pennsylvania, U.S.
- Genre: Indie rock
- Labels: MAD Dragon Records (2007–present)
- Members: Steve Yutzy-Burkey, Krista Yutzy-Burkey, Scott French, Rick Sieber
- Website: The Swimmers on Myspace

The Swimmers are an American four-piece rock band from Philadelphia and include drums, guitar, keyboard (or synth more recently), and bass. They are signed to Drexel University's MAD Dragon Records and released their first album, Fighting Trees in 2008. It garnered rave reviews from The Philadelphia Inquirer, Magnet, The Tripwire and Time Out Chicago. For their second record, The Swimmers started fresh by building a home studio and producing and recording it themselves. According to lead singer, Steve Yutzy-Burkey, “It was a very focused and isolated time in the studio, and much of the grit was in the mixing process. These songs were darker and more intricate than the last record, and they demanded a very affected, refined sound.” Their record, People Are Soft was released on November 3, 2009. The first music video from People Are Soft, "What This World Is Coming To", premiered on The Music Slut blog in September 2009. People Are Soft has received rave reviews from numerous blogs, and was recommended in Pitchfork Media's Guide to Upcoming Fall 2009 Releases. In its first week at college radio, The Swimmers was the 12th most added.

The Swimmers' "Fighting Tree" was nominated in the 8th Annual Independent Music Awards for College Record Label Album of the year. In January, 2011, they were nominated again for The 10th Annual Independent Music Awards in the College Record Label Release, Pop/Rock Song, and Artist/Band Publicity Photography categories.

== Discography ==
- Fighting Trees (2008)
- People Are Soft (2009)
