= Toy Soldiers (band) =

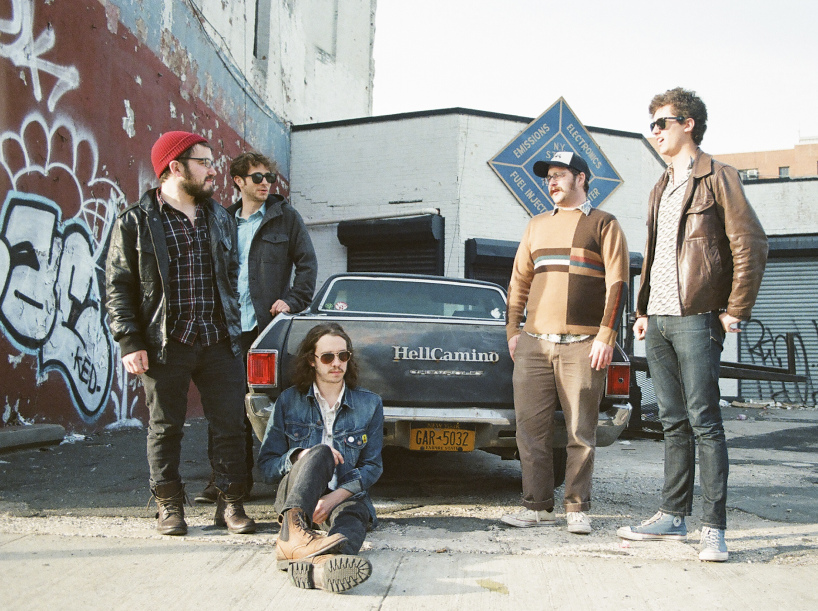
- Toy Soldiers in New York City

Background information
- Origin: Philadelphia, Pennsylvania
- Genres: Blues, soul, rock, americana
- Years active: 2007–2014
- Members: Ron Gallo, Dominic Billett, Bill McCloskey, Matt Kelly and Luke Leidy

Toy Soldiers were an American rock band from Philadelphia, Pennsylvania. The group's sound melds elements of folk, roots rock, blues, and soul.

== History ==
Toy Soldiers formed in 2007 as a two-piece with Ron Gallo as the primary songwriter, alongside former drummer Mike Baurer. The name Toy Soldiers was taken from a painting on display at the Philadelphia Museum of Art. Though the band's sound was initially lo-fi and sparse, they eventually expanded to as large as ten members, including keyboards, horns, and backing vocalists. The band's membership remained fluid at times, with some members occasionally meeting each other for the first time as they took the stage for shows. Their debut album, Whisper Down the Lane, was initially self-released in the fall of 2009, but after signing with MAD Dragon Records, the group re-recorded several songs for the re-release of the album. MAD Dragon reissued the record on May 18, 2010. Critic Richie Unterberger noted the album's gospel and old-time music influences and likened Gallo's singing to that of Lou Reed and Marc Bolan. The group accompanied the CD release with several live dates, including as a headliner and with Midlake. The group played the WXPN Xponential Music Festival in July 2010.

By October 2010, there was an entirely new and solidified lineup consisting of Gallo, Dominic Billett, Matt Kelly, Bill McCloskey and Luke Leidy. The new group recorded a new EP titled Get Through the Time released on Ropeadope Records on September 20, 2011. They also released a split EP, Midweek Mountain Getaway with Nashville Singer-Songwriter, Jordan Hull.

The band won The 10th Annual Independent Music Awards in the Blues Song category for their song "Throw Me Down". Toy Soldiers were also nominated for Alt. Country Album and College Label Release. They were also selected as the TriStateIndie Band of the Year in 2011 and 2012. They have made appearances at 2012–13 SXSW, 2008–2012 CMJ, XPoNential Music Festival 2010, Philadelphia Folk Fest 2013 and have shared the stage with Dr. Dog, Fitz and the Tantrums, The Felice Brothers, Justin Townes Earle, Jonny Fritz, The Walkmen, J. Roddy Walston and The Business and more.

In late 2012, USA Today named the band one of 5 "Bands to Watch" in 2013, saying "Toy Soldiers is a rowdy collection of five talented young musicians who have honed their sometimes soulful, often blues-y rock n roll with relentless touring during the last two years, growing into one of Philadelphia's best live bands."

Seth Klinger made a documentary titled The Maybe Trails. It followed the band on their March 2012 and 2013 tours through Austin, Texas for SXSW and was premiered in April 2013 at Johnny Brenda's in Philadelphia.

In April 2013, Toy Soldiers recorded four songs at Converse Rubber Tracks Studios in Brooklyn, New York and released them digitally and on 7" vinyl (entitled Converse Rubber Tracks Sessions) on July 4, 2013, at their first annual 4 July BBQ in Philadelphia. In June 2013, the group was selected to record a live video session for Paste Magazine at the Aloft Washington Harbor Hotel. The video premiered on Paste.com on July 15, and a few days later, Paste also premiered "Tell The Teller," the first single from their upcoming album.

Over the course of 15 sessions from January through August 2012, the group recorded what would become their second album (and first under the new configuration), entitled The Maybe Boys. In February 2012, the band released a limited edition EP previewing three tracks from the sessions, called Tell The Teller EP. The full-length record, including those three tracks from the preview, was released on September 10, 2013, and distributed by The Orchard.

Some notable press for the album included a video premiere for the single "Red Dress" on Esquire.com, mp3 premiere of "Red Dress on The A.V. Club, premiere of "Forget How It Used To Be" on GuitarWorld.com, a "Key Session" on WXPN, a Huffington Post "A-Sides" Session and more.

== Members ==
Current

- Ron Gallo – vocals, guitar, harmonica
- Dominic Billett – drums, vocals
- Matt Kelly – guitar, vocals
- Luke Leidy – piano, organ
- Bill McCloskey – bass

Former

- Bennett Daniels – bass
- Dan King – guitar
- Noah Skaroff – saxophone, banjo, lap steel guitar, organ, vocals
- Tom Cladek – drums
- Kate Foust – vocals
- Tyler Beck – bass
- Josiah Wise – vocals
- Zach Poyatt – vocals, guitar, piano
- Mike Baurer – drums
- Vinchelle Woods – vocals
- Garrett Smith – percussion

== Discography ==
- Whisper Down the Lane (May 2010)
- Get Through the Time EP (Sept 2011)
- Midweek Mountain Getaway (Oct 2011) [Split EP with Jordan Hull]
- Tell The Teller EP (Feb 2012)
- Converse Rubber Tracks Sessions (July 2013)
- The Maybe Boys (Sept 2013)
