= Ron Gallo =

American singer-songwriter

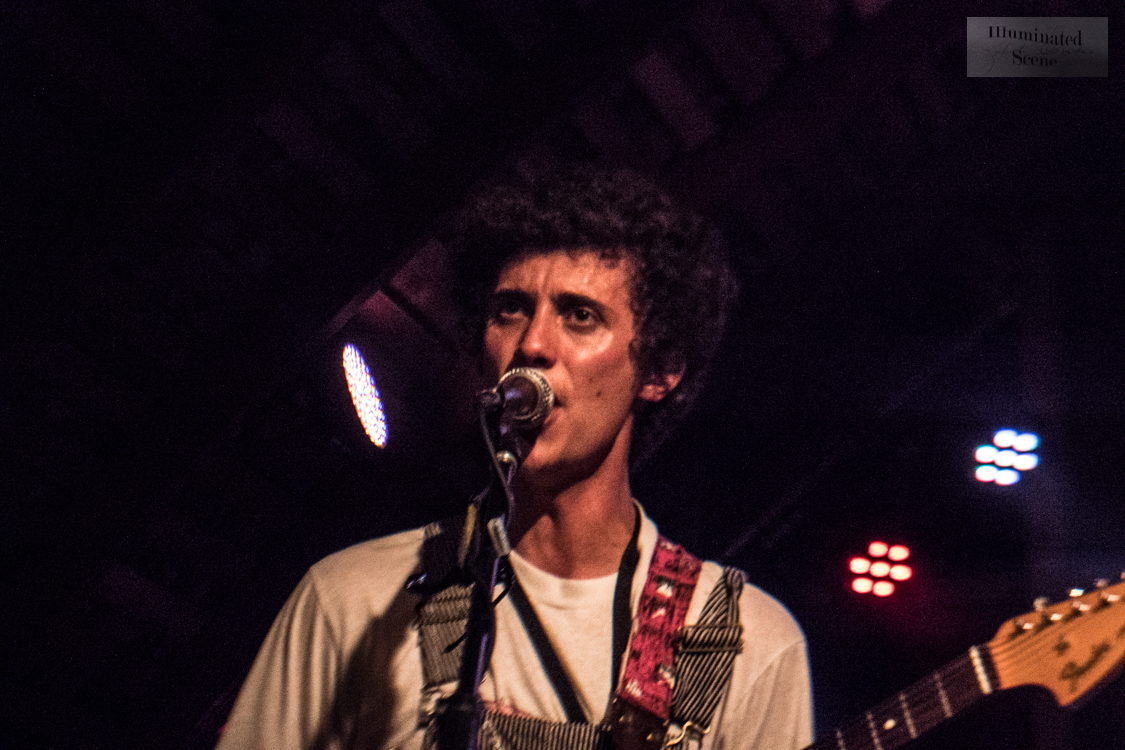
- Ron Gallo in 2016

Background information
- Born: Ronald James Gallo III; September 29, 1992 (age 34); New Jersey
- Origin: Philadelphia, PA, USA
- Genres: Garage punk; indie pop; lo-fi; art rock; post-punk
- Occupations: Musician; singer-songwriter
- Instruments: Vocals; guitar; bass guitar
- Years active: 2014–present
- Labels: Kill Rock Stars; New West Records; American Diamond Recordings
- Website: rongallomusic.com

Ronald James Gallo III is an American musician, singer, songwriter and artist. He began a solo career in 2014, after fronting various bands including Philadelphia-based band Toy Soldiers and since then has released five albums, Heavy Meta, Stardust Birthday Party, Really Nice Guys (EP), Peacemeal, Foreground Music and checkmate. Stylistically Gallo has shifted from release to release, with his recent albums exploring art rock and garage punk. During live performances 2016 - 2019 Gallo was backed by bassist Joe Bisirri and drummer Dylan Sevey.

== Career ==
On December 15, 2016, NPR premiered a video for "Please Yourself" from Heavy Meta in which Gallo disrupts an intersection of downtown Nashville by performing on a truck bed. The article describes Gallo as an "insurgent poet and rock 'n' roll disruptor" and the album as a "burst of literate electricity" Heavy Meta was released worldwide on February 4, 2017, on New West Records. In support of the record, Gallo has toured nationally and internationally, sharing the stage with White Reaper, Twin Peaks, Thee Oh Sees, The Black Angels, The Gories, FIDLAR, and Hurray for the Riff Raff amongst others. Gallo has also received coverage from various national outlets including The Fader, and has performed at festivals such as Coachella, Bonnaroo, Austin City Limits Music Festival, SXSW, and Governors Ball Music Festival.

On January 16, 2018, the Really Nice Guys EP was release via New West Records. It is a joke concept album about Gallo's experience in the music industry. The EP explores many different genres, from thrash punk to psychedelic pop to Indian influenced music. The EP also features a skit entitled, “The East Nashville Kroger Conversation” featuring Gallo and his two band members pretending to run into each other at a grocery store in Nashville. On the day of the release, the band filmed a mockumentary of the same title, following Gallo as he goes through an identity crisis as well as the band around town as they perform a series of unsuccessful release shows and showcasing for their record label. It was directed by Christian Gentry.

On October 5, Gallo's second full-length "Stardust Birthday Party" was released. The record was a slight sonic shift from his previous work exploring more post-punk, and new wave influences while discussing his own spiritual path and asking a variety of existential questions. The 7th Level described the album genre as "Zen Punk" The Guardian described the album as "Stardust Birthday Party brings the fruits of meditation to Nashville-based Gallo's jams – a little like Bodhisattva Vow marked the influx of MCA's Buddhism into the Beastie Boys."

On March 14 and 15, 2020, Gallo and a newly formed band performed two live stream performances from his home on Instagram live as result of the spread of Coronavirus and his appearance at the Melted festival in Columbus, OH being canceled. The performance was to make up for the lost show and to encourage people to stay home during the pandemic. This performance was one of the first of its kind in response to the virus.

Due to the success of the live streams, Gallo launched Really Nice Fest on March 18, 2020. Calling it "an ongoing, everchanging digital festival" named after a blog/online creative outlet Really Nice (http://reallynice.world) he started in December 2019. The digital festival features himself and other artists and friends from all over the world performing live stream sets, Q & A, DJ sets, talk show segments, tutorials, etc. The festival is planned to continue on through the duration of the Coronavirus quarantine period.

On June 10, 2020, Gallo released a new single "You Are Enough", signaling a stylistic transformation into a more pop direction with influence from 90's R&B and Hip-Hop, following up with three more singles "Hide (Myself Behind)", "Wunday (Crazy After Dark)" and "Easter Island" and announcing a new album "Peacemeal" which was released March 12, 2021.

On September 6, 2022, Gallo announced signing with label Kill Rock Stars and released the single, "Entitled Man".

On November 15, 2022, Gallo announced a new album entitled "Foreground Music", alongside a single and music video of the same title, to be released on Kill Rock Stars on March 3, 2023. The album was co-produced with his partner, Chiara D'Anzieri (also known as Santa Chiara (musician) and features the already released singles "Anything But This" (co-written with Chiara D'Anzieri), "Yucca Valley Marshalls" and "At Least I'm Dancing".

On March 3, 2023 Gallo released "Foreground Music", his first album for new label home, Kill Rock Stars.

In February 2025, Gallo began an online song series called "7AM Songs of Resistance For The Internet" which involved him quickly writing short songs, often socio-political or reactionary to the news and sharing them to social media. His song reaction to the Oval Office meeting between Donald Trump and Ukrainian President, Volodymyr Zelenskyy "If Only Zelenskyy Had a Nice Suit" went viral garnering 8 million views overnight. The series has reached over 80 songs and reached millions worldwide including the praise of SZA, Mark Ruffalo, Cat Power, Moby and more.

On October 17th, 2025 Gallo released his sixth album "checkmate" on label Kill Rock Stars.

== Discography ==
=== Solo ===
Studio albums

- Ronny (2014)
- Heavy Meta (2017)
- Stardust Birthday Party (2018)
- Peacemeal (2021)
- Foreground Music (2023)
- 7AM Songs of Resistance For the Internet (2025)
- checkmate (2025)

Extended plays

- Really Nice Guys (2018)

Singles

- "Hide Myself Behind You" (2020)

=== With Toy Soldiers ===
Toy Soldiers

- The Maybe Boys (2013)
