= Universal Blues =

Studio album by The Redwalls
- Released: November 18, 2003
- Genre: Rock
- Length: 38:00
- Label: Undertow
- Producer: The Redwalls, Dan Dietrich

The Redwalls chronology
Universal Blues (2003)	De Nova (2005)

Professional ratings
Review scores
Source	Rating
AllMusic	4/5 stars

Universal Blues is the debut album by Chicago-based rock band The Redwalls, released in the United States on November 18, 2003 by Undertow Music. In 2007, the band re-released Universal Blues on Princeton Lane Records with six bonus tracks from early band demos.

== Critical reception ==
Reviewers frequently noted Universal Blues' heavy debt to 1960s rock, particularly the Beatles. In a contemporary review for PopMatters, Adrien Begrand described the album as a throwback to mid-1960s British rock and wrote that listening to it was “instantly transported” to the early Beatles era, emphasizing the band’s focus on pop hooks amid the 2000s garage-rock revival. Begrand also highlighted specific Beatles-like details, including comparisons between Logan Baren’s vocal style and John Lennon and an observation that “Colorful Revolution” borrows a bassline associated with “Ob-La-Di, Ob-La-Da”.

An AllMusic review by critic Tim Sendra (reprinted by Qobuz) similarly framed the record as an overt homage to classic 1960s rock, citing influences including Dylan, the Beatles, CCR, and the Rolling Stones. Sendra was more critical of the band’s originality, characterizing the album as near “note-perfect” imitation, but argued that its enthusiasm and songcraft made it an enjoyable listen despite the derivativeness.

== Track listing ==
#	Title	Composer(s)	Time
1	"Colorful Revolution"	Andrew Langer	3:43
2	"You'll Never Know"	The Redwalls	5:26
3	"It's Alright"	The Redwalls	2:57
4	"Speed Racer"	The Redwalls	2:28
5	"How the Story Goes"	The Redwalls	3:56
6	"It's Love You're On"	The Redwalls	2:45
7	"What a Shame"	The Redwalls	3:08
8	"Home"	The Redwalls	2:45
9	"Balinese"	ZZ Top	4:35
10	"I Just Want to Be the One"	The Redwalls	2:20
11	"Universal Blues"	The Redwalls	3:33

== Re-release bonus tracks ==
1. "Let It Ride"
2. "In My Song"
3. "Better Days"
4. "Please Listen"
5. "Untrue"
6. "Just a Day Away"
