= The Redwalls =

American rock band

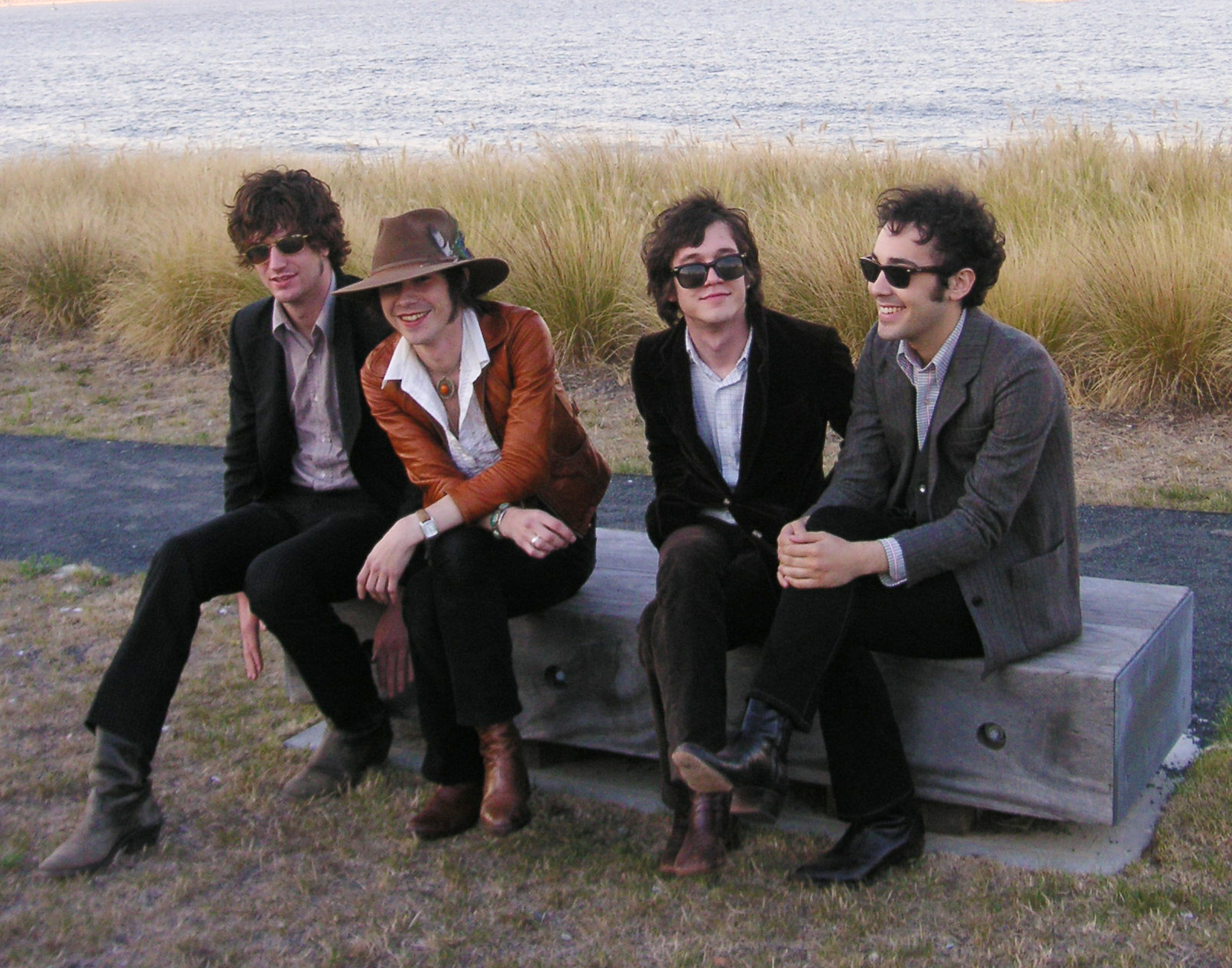
- The Redwalls in 2005. Left to right: Ben Greeno, Logan Baren, Justin Baren, Andrew Langer.

Background information
- Origin: Deerfield, Illinois, U.S.
- Genres: Indie rock, alternative rock
- Years active: 2001–2012; 2024–2025
- Labels: Undertow Music (2003); Capitol (2003–2007); MAD Dragon Records (2007–2009)
- Past members: Logan Baren; Justin Baren; Jason Roberts; Andrew Langer; Jordan Kozer; Rob Jensen; Ben Greeno
- Website: theredwalls.music

The Redwalls are an American rock band from Deerfield, Illinois, in suburban Chicago. In 2005, their retro sound drew comparisons to the Beatles and other British Invasion–era acts.

After initially disbanding in 2012, the group returned to recording activity in 2024. Founding member Justin Baren, bassist and vocalist, died in December 2025 at the age of 40.

The band's final performing lineup during their initial run consisted of vocalist and guitarist Logan Baren, bassist Justin Baren, and drummer Ben Greeno. Former members include lead guitarist Andrew Langer and a series of drummers; founding member Jordan Kozer played on debut album Universal Blues.

== History ==
Formed in 2001 while still in high school, the Redwalls were originally a British Invasion–inspired cover band named the Pages, initially learning songs by the Beatles and the Rolling Stones. They played their first show at the local jazz club Pops for Champagne. Soon after, they began writing original material and earned a regular booking at the local Evanston club Nevin's Live, with the venue's booking manager Mitchell Marlow, who eventually quit his post to manage the band full-time. With the help of Marlow's longtime friend and former Wilco drummer Ken Coomer, the band's demo recording made its way to Capitol Records' A&R Julian Raymond, and while in the midst of working on their debut LP for the Chicago-based indie label Undertow, the band signed to Capitol in mid-2003. The band changed their name to The Redwalls at the label's request due to a conflict regarding an earlier Capitol signing known as Pages, who were better known as Mr. Mister. The band finished recording in 2003, however after completing sessions for the album, Kozer quit the group to attend college and was replaced by Ben Greeno. The Redwalls' debut album Universal Blues was later released on November 18, 2003. Reviewing Universal Blues, PopMatters wrote that the album evoked the sound of the early Beatles.

In 2007, The Redwalls finished recording material for a third album, however, the band was dropped from Capitol Records. They quickly signed with indie label MAD Dragon Records and their album The Redwalls was released on October 23, 2007. In addition, their song "Build a Bridge" was featured on an AT&T commercial. By 2008, the band embarked on a US tour, which culminated with performances on the Late Show with David Letterman and The Tonight Show with Jay Leno on April 10, 2008. In the latter part of 2008, Ben Greeno left the group and was replaced by Rob Jensen. The Redwalls once again began touring in the UK, this time supporting the Zutons. However, lead guitarist Andrew Langer left the group to focus on other musical projects. Commenting on his decision to leave the band, he stated that "The Redwalls was our childhood dream. It was a fun and exciting experience for a while, but as my musical taste grew outside of that bubble, it became apparent that I wanted to move in a different direction". Session musician Duane Leinan joined the band in 2010 playing bass guitar.

The Redwalls released their debut UK single "Memories" on January 5, 2009. Shortly after, drummer Rob Jensen announced his departure from the group to focus on other musical projects. In regards to Jensen's departure, Justin stated through the band's MySpace:

The Redwalls started when my brother and I started to sing and to play in harmony. And from that we have always found people to play in harmony with. And that is the idea of The Redwalls. There are many more songs to be sung, and many more people to sing and play with. But the idea remains the same. Thank you to all our fans and know that we are always singing. The music will stand for itself. We have many songs we can't wait to share with you.

=== Hiatus, disbandment, and later recordings ===
The band later disbanded in 2012. According to the Chicago Sun-Times, the Baren brothers recorded sessions at Parr Street Studios in Liverpool in 2012 that remained unreleased for years. The band returned to the studio in 2024, working on new material.

=== Post-split ===
Following his departure from the band, guitarist Andrew Langer joined Ezra Furman and the Harpoons as guitarist in 2008 and also formed the Sleeptalkers with the original Redwalls drummer Jordan Kozer. They self-released their debut album Back To Earth in 2009.

Justin Baren died on November 28, 2025, at the age of 40.

== Musical style and influences ==
The Redwalls have been described as a Chicago-area indie rock band whose early recordings drew comparisons to the Beatles and other British Invasion acts. A Pitchfork review of De Nova identified the album's genre as “Electronic / Rock” and characterized the band as “60s pop” revivalists.

In a concert review, critic Jim DeRogatis wrote that the band's inspiration leaned toward the Beatles’ early, R&B-driven period, highlighting “proto-punk” energy alongside soul-, blues- and Motown-inflected rhythms, while also noting a visible Britpop influence in the group's harmonies. Houston Press similarly framed the band's appeal in terms of “good, old-fashioned… rock and roll,” emphasizing harmonies and classic-rock touchstones.

On their 2007 self-titled album, Chicago magazine noted a shift toward experimentation, describing the band as emerging from “garage rock revival” origins while incorporating electronic dance and psychedelic elements. In announcing the album's release, Glide described the band's approach as rooted in rhythm and blues and power pop, while presenting a “grittier” rock direction than earlier work. A Dallas Observer feature similarly discussed the band's blend of retro rock references with pop songwriting.

== Discography ==
- Universal Blues (2003)
- De Nova (2005)
- The Redwalls (2007)

=== EPs ===
- The Wall to Wall Sessions (2007)
