= Pretty Good Dance Moves =

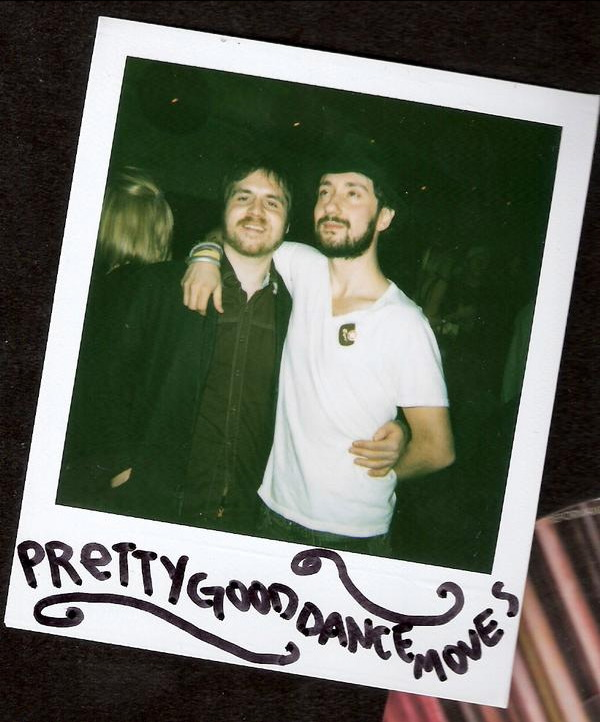
- Pretty Good Dance Moves

Background information
- Origin: Chicago / Brooklyn, United States
- Genres: Indietronica, electropop
- Years active: 2007–present
- Members: Jimmy Giannopoulos; Aaron Allietta
- Website: prettygooddancemoves.com

Pretty Good Dance Moves is an indietronica band from Chicago, Illinois in the United States. Their style has been described as electropop. They are influenced by 1980s new wave, electronic, pop, and indie rock genres.

== Career ==
Pretty Good Dance Moves started in 2007 in Chicago after Aaron Allieta and Jimmy Giannopoulos met while bartending together. They recorded their first songs "P.G.D.M" and "Demons Dancing" between June and September 2007. Giannopoulos and Allieta soon contacted Genevieve Schatz of the Chicago band Company of Thieves to work together on music. Schatz's vocal performances are featured on the earliest songs Pretty Good Dance Moves produced, which were written and recorded between January and May 2007.

In 2008, the band won Famecast's award for best electronic video, which included $10,000 and a feature in Billboard magazine. In 2011, Pretty Good Dance Moves signed to Mad Dragon Records to release Limo, their first full-length album. The LP, consisting of 8 songs, was released on February 7, 2012, and featured vocals from Sabina Sciubba of Brazilian Girls.

== Style ==
The music magazine SPIN has compared their earliest songs to indietronica band The Postal Service. Pretty Good Dance Moves EP has also been compared to James Murphy's house music project LCD Soundsystem, UK downtempo group Zero 7, and the Brazilian Girls.

== Collaborations ==
Pretty Good Dance Moves has collaborated with Genevieve Schatz from Chicago band Company of Thieves, American comedian Kristen Schaal in the making of the music video "Demons Dancing," and America's Next Top Model runner up Shandi Sullivan in the making of the music video for "In the Heat of the Night". The band currently collaborates with members of Chicago indie rock group The Changes and Chicago electronic rock band Walter Meego.
