= Tony Lucca =

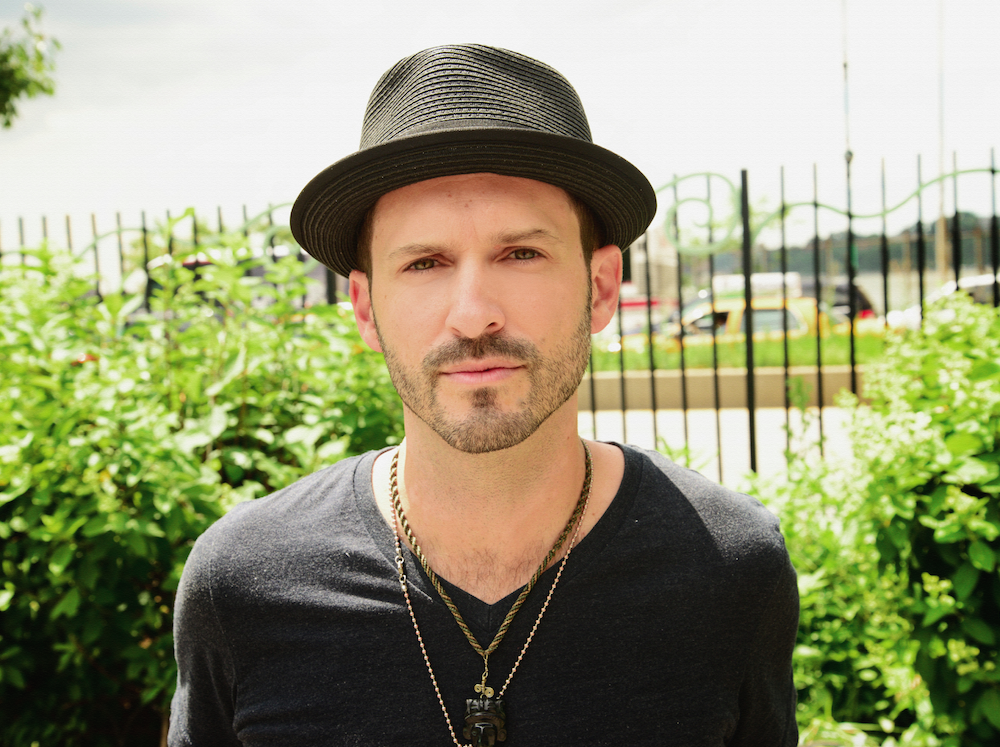

Background information
- Born: Anthony James Lucca; January 23, 1976 (age 50); Pontiac, Michigan, U.S.
- Origin: Waterford, Michigan, U.S.
- Genres: Rock; folk; acoustic; singer-songwriter; dancer; actor
- Instruments: Vocals; guitar
- Years active: 1991–present
- Labels: 222; Rock Ridge; Lucca
- Spouse: Rachel Lucca (m. 2007)
- Website: tonylucca.com
- Children: 1

Anthony James Lucca (born January 23, 1976) is an American singer, songwriter, record producer, actor, and dancer. He is perhaps best known for starting his career on The All New Mickey Mouse Club. After the All New Mickey Mouse Club, Lucca went to Los Angeles for a brief career as an actor, then became a full-time musician. He has toured with several acts, including Maroon 5, Kelly Clarkson, *NSYNC, Marc Anthony, Sara Bareilles, Matt Duke, Tyrone Wells, and Chris Whitley. He finished in third place on the second season (2012) of the American reality television singing competition talent show, The Voice, broadcast on NBC.

== Early life ==
Lucca was born in Pontiac, Michigan, the son of Sally and Tony Lucca. Lucca is of Italian, Welsh, French, and English descent. Lucca grew up around a large and musical extended family, as his mother Sally was tenth of twelve children of the Detroit jazz piano player James "Jimmy" Stevenson. Lucca grew up in Waterford, Michigan, and began singing at age 3 and child modeling at age 9. When he was 12, he began playing in Detroit-area bands with his cousin, Cole Garlak.

== Professional and musical career ==
=== Early career ===
When Lucca was 14, he went to Detroit to audition for the Disney movie Newsies, only to find out the audition was for The All New Mickey Mouse Club instead. Encouraged by his sister, he auditioned for the show and was picked for callbacks in Los Angeles. In Los Angeles, he was selected along with 8 other kids to join the cast for the fourth season of the show. Lucca moved to Orlando, Florida, with his mother and lived in an apartment complex with other castmates and traveled back to Michigan between seasons. Other famous cast members on the show included Britney Spears, JC Chasez, Christina Aguilera, Justin Timberlake, Ryan Gosling, and Keri Russell. He remained with the show for four seasons, until the show was canceled after the seventh season.

In 1995, after the cancellation of the All New Mickey Mouse Club, Lucca moved to Los Angeles to begin an acting career. He lived with fellow Mickey Mouse Club castmate Keri Russell, his girlfriend at the time. Russell and Lucca were cast and played leads together on the Aaron Spelling-produced Malibu Shores, a television teen drama series, which lasted for one season. During this time he filmed commercials for Levi Jeans, J.C. Penney, and Blockbuster Video. He had minor success in movies, appearing in an NBC movie of the week, Her Last Chance with Kellie Martin and Jonathan Brandis, as well as two independent features. He left acting in 1997 to pursue music.

In 1997, Lucca self-released his first music album, So Satisfied, which he also co-produced. In 1998, he launched his website www.tonylucca.com and began to sell his debut CD and its self-released follow-up, Strong Words Softly Spoken through the website and at live shows he later released two EPs and a limited series of Live & Limited CDs through his site; each CD sold was numbered and signed. In 2001 and 2002, he served as opening act for boy band NSYNC, whose members were fellow Mickey Mouse Club co-stars Justin Timberlake and JC Chasez.

Lucca's third full-length album and his first commercially distributed, Shotgun, was released in 2004 in conjunction with Lightyear and New Vibe Records; the album was executive co-produced by JC Chasez, who Lucca toured with to support the album. 2006 saw the release of Canyon Songs, recorded in both Laurel and Beachwood Canyons, and Live in Hollywood, a live concert album; both albums were distributed by Rock Ridge Music. Come Around Again was released in 2008.

Lucca participated in a cooperative tour with Jay Nash and Matt Duke, which resulted in the 2009 EP entitled TFDI. The collaboration, which stands for "Totally Fuckin' Doing It" was recorded in the Evanston, Illinois, studio SPACE during an impromptu visit to the studio, after the three artists formed a friendship during the tour. Lucca briefly returned to acting in 2010, starring in a 901 Silver Tequila commercial, which was directed by the brand's founder Justin Timberlake. He also played himself on an episode of Parenthood, appearing as a performing musician. Lucca's sixth album was released in 2010, entitled Rendezvous With the Angels, on Rock Ridge Music. Solo, an acoustic CD composed of b-sides and previously unreleased recordings was released in November 2010, and given away for free in conjunction with Amazon.com's MP3 web store. Lucca recorded a second collaborative CD with Jay Nash and Matt Duke, TFDI II, which was released mid-2011.

=== The Voice and 222 Records (2012–2018) ===
On February 5, 2012, Tony appeared on the Blind Auditions of the American reality talent show The Voice in its second season. He performed Ray LaMontagne's "Trouble", and all four judges hit their red "I Want You" button for him. He chose to join Adam Levine's team. It was also in this show he reunited with fellow Mouseketeer Christina Aguilera. He advanced to the semi-finals, which he performed "How You Like Me Now" by The Heavy and moved on to the final round. For the final round on May 7, he performed Hugo's country-styled version of the Jay-Z song, "99 Problems". On May 8, 2012, Lucca made his last performance on the show duetting with fellow contestant Jordis Unga formerly of Team Blake on the Fleetwood Mac song, "Go Your Own Way". Later that night, it was announced he had placed third in the competition, barely placing ahead of Mann by one quarter of a percentage point and coming behind winner Jermaine Paul from Team Blake and first runner-up Juliet Simms from Team Cee Lo. Lucca was later signed to Adam Levine's record label, 222 Records.

Performances on The Voice
Show	Song	Original artist	Order	Result
Blind Audition	"Trouble"	Ray LaMontagne	9	All four chairs turned Lucca joined Adam Levine's Team
Battles (Top 48)	"Beautiful Day" (vs. Chris Cauley)	U2	—N/a	Saved by Adam Levine
Live Show	"In Your Eyes"	Peter Gabriel	3	Saved (Public Vote)
Quarter-finals (First Week)	"...Baby One More Time"	Britney Spears	5	Saved (Public Vote)
Semi-finals	"How You Like Me Now?"	The Heavy	1	Safe (108 Points)
Live Finale (Final 4)	"99 Problems"	Jay-Z	4	3rd Place
Live Finale (Final 4)	"Harder To Breathe"	Maroon 5	11	3rd Place
Live Finale (Final 4)	"Yesterday" (with Adam Levine)	The Beatles	7	3rd Place

Lucca released a six-song EP, With the Whole World Watching, on July 16, 2013. Lucca toured extensively following the release, including six dates on the Honda Civic Tour opening for Kelly Clarkson and Maroon 5.

Lucca joined Patreon in 2013. On November 12, 2013, while plugging Patreon on his YouTube channel, Tony announced he is no longer with Adam Levine's record label 222 Records. Excerpt: "Some of you know that recently I was signed to a fairly high profile record deal. -Super cool. What most of you don't know is that, said "record deal", has since come to an end. -Not as cool. Your basic record business 101 really..."

Tony Lucca then moved to Nashville, Tennessee to further develop his songwriting. He funded his 2015 album Tony Lucca via crowd-funding platform Kickstarter, also releasing a corresponding collection of songs called Made To Shine – The Kickstarter Sessions. Lucca would later share that the 2015 album took a personal toll on him, like "going through a really bad breakup," and told Billboard that after the record he "was in no hurry to get back in the studio" but instead elected to co-write as many songs as he could with Nashville collaborators.

In 2018, Lucca partnered with Nashville startup company RootNote and began work on his new record Ain't No Storm, which he recorded with Nashville-based producer and former Wilco drummer Ken Coomer. He released the first single and music video, "Everything's Changing," in November 2018. At the end of 2018, he signed a publishing deal with Demolition Music.

=== Ain't No Storm (2019–present) ===
Tony Lucca independently released Ain't No Storm on March 29, 2019. The album received critical acclaim, with PopMatters calling it an "expanding of his musical boundaries" and likening Lucca to contemporaries Amos Lee, Jason Isbell, and Ben Schneider. Others called it "one helluva record," "highly crafted songwriting," and "more inspired than ever."

== Other ventures ==
Many of Lucca's songs have been featured in various TV shows, including Friday Night Lights, Brothers & Sisters, Shark and Felicity and in the movie Open Range. He appeared in an episode of the E! True Hollywood Story series, covering his time spent on The All New Mickey Mouse Club in 2007. He has performed numerous times on NBC's Last Call with Carson Daly as a part of the show's band.

== Personal life ==
Lucca dated his fellow Mouseketeer (and eventual Malibu Shores co-star) Keri Russell on-and-off for eight years.

On July 7, 2007, Lucca married Rachel. He adopted her son and they later had a daughter together.

== Discography ==
=== Studio albums ===
- So Satisfied (1997)
- Strong Words, Softly Spoken (1997, re-issued 1999)
- Shotgun (2004)
- Canyon Songs (2006; re-issued 2013 'Bonus Edition')
- Come Around Again (2008)
- Rendezvous with the Angels (2010)
- TFDI – When I Stop Running with Jay Nash and Matt Duke (2011)
- Solo (2011)
- Under the Influence (2011)
- Tony Lucca (2015)
- Ain't No Storm (2019)
- How Happy It Feels (2023)
- Heirloom (2025)

=== Live albums ===
- Live & Limited V3 (2005) – CD-R-only independent release; recorded February 2005 in Brooklyn, New York; limited to 300 copies
- Live in Hollywood (2006) – digital-only independent release
- Live at Jammin' Java (2011)

=== EPs ===
- So Far (2001)
- Simply Six (2002)
- Songs from the DVD "Anatomy of a Blackbird" (2005) – digital-only release
- Through the Cracks (2006)
- Close Enough (2008)
- TFDI with Jay Nash and Matt Duke
- TFDI II with Jay Nash and Matt Duke
- With the Whole World Watching (2013)
- Drawing Board (2014)
- Made to Shine: The Kickstarter Sessions (2015)
- Sessions Volume 1: Sun Studio (2016)
- Sessions Volume 2: Muscle Shoals (2016)
- TFDI – Beggars & Ballers with Jay Nash and Matt Duke (2017)
- TFDI – The Minute You Get It with Jay Nash and Matt Duke (2017)

=== Singles ===
List of singles, with selected chart positions, showing year released and album name
Title	Year	Peak chart positions	Album
Title	Year	US	Album
"Trouble"	2012	—	Non-album releases by The Voice
"Beautiful Day"	2012	—	Non-album releases by The Voice
"In Your Eyes"	2012	—	Non-album releases by The Voice
"...Baby One More Time"	2012	117	Non-album releases by The Voice
"How You Like Me Now?"	2012	—	Non-album releases by The Voice
"99 Problems"	2012	58	Non-album releases by The Voice
"Yesterday" (with Adam Levine)	2012	68	Non-album releases by The Voice
"Never Gonna Let You Go"	2013	—	With the Whole World Watching
"Delilah (When the Lights Go Out)"	2014	—	Tony Lucca
"Imagination"	2014	—	Tony Lucca
"Right On Time"	2014	—	Tony Lucca
"Home for the Holidays"	2014	—	A Rock by the Sea Christmas: Volume Five
"Nashville"	2018	—	Non-album single
"—" denotes a recording that did not chart or was not released in that territory.

== Selected filmography ==
- 1991–1995 The All New Mickey Mouse Club as himself
- 1993 Emerald Cove as Jeff Chambers
- 1996 Her Last Chance as Cody
- 1996 Malibu Shores as Zack Morrison
- 1997 Take a Number as Todd
- 1998 Too Pure as Jared
- 2004 The Wayne Brady Show as himself
- 2007 E! True Hollywood Story: The All New Mickey Mouse Club as himself

=== DVDs ===
- Anatomy of a Blackbird (2005) – recorded live at Mama Juana's in Los Angeles, California
- A Night at The Mint (2009) – recorded live at The Mint in Los Angeles, California
