= Heavy Meta (Ron Gallo album) =

Studio album by Ron Gallo
- Released: February 3, 2017
- Recorded: November 2016
- Genre: Garage punk, indie rock
- Label: New West
- Producer: Joe Bisirri and Ron Gallo

Ron Gallo chronology
Ronny (2014)	Heavy Meta (2017)	Really Nice Guys (2018)

Heavy Meta (stylized as HEAVY META) is the second solo studio album by Ron Gallo, released on February 3, 2017.

== Reception ==
Professional ratings
Aggregate scores
Source	Rating
Metacritic	72/100
Review scores
Source	Rating
AllMusic	4/5 stars
American Songwriter	4/5 stars
The Independent	3/5 stars
The Observer	4/5 stars
The Skinny	2/5 stars

Heavy Meta score of 72 out of 100 on the online review aggregate site Metacritic, indicating "Generally favorable reviews"."

== Track listing ==
No.	Title	Length
1.	"Young Lady, You're Scaring Me"	3:40
2.	"Put The Kids To Bed"	2:54
3.	"Kill The Medicine Man"	2:33
4.	"Poor Traits Of The Artist"	2:56
5.	"Why Do You Have Kids?"	3:16
6.	"Please Yourself"	1:23
7.	"Black Market Eyes"	5:49
8.	"Can't Stand You"	3:47
9.	"Started A War"	3:46
10.	"Don't Mind The Lion"	5:18
11.	"All The Punks Are Domesticated"	3:56

== Charting ==
- "Young Lady, You're Scaring Me": No. 30 Adult Alternative Songs, No. 46 Mediabase Alternative

== Personnel ==
- Produced by: Joe Bisirri & Ron Gallo
- Mixed by: Joe Bisirri
- Recorded by: Joe Bisirri
- Mastered by: Ryan Schwabe
- A&R: Kim Buie
