= MAD Dragon Music Group =

Music company run by Drexel University

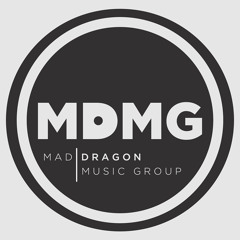
Logo of MAD Dragon Music Group

The Music Industry Program Entities, or the MAD Dragon Music Group (MDMG), is an umbrella company owned by Drexel University, run by university students and overseen by faculty and staff. The purpose of the company is to provide industry experience to the students in the university's Music Industry program. The companies of MDMG include MAD Dragon Records, DraKo Booking, MAD Dragon Publishing, MADKo Concerts, and artist services company Bantic Media.

== History of the Music Industry program ==
The brainchild of Jonathan Estrin, the dean of the college at that time, the Music Industry program came about in 2000 when he came to Drexel to head the College of Media Arts and Design and wanted to revive the sub-par music program, "re-envisioning the media-oriented university for the new century". Part of the process was redesigning the curriculum, which showed that the music program would need an overhaul and the addition of a recording studio. After obtaining $250,000 in funding staffing was hired for the program. Marcy Rauer Wagman, an entertainment lawyer and former songwriter/producer, was hired to teach about industry law, business models, royalties, and create and manage a student-run record label. The concept of having an umbrella organization was the brainchild of Wagman in 2003 as a way for students to have experience in all aspects of the music industry.

The name MAD Dragon came from the fact that the College of Media Arts and Design was often abbreviated as CoMAD and the university's mascot is a dragon.

== MAD Dragon Records ==
The record label, MAD Dragon Records, is the only student run record label with a national distribution deal. It was signed through RYKO Distribution in Spring 2005 and is run out of the University itself. The venture between Ryko and MAD Dragon allows the LPs that are produced to be distributed nationally while allowing the students to continue to work with the artist. MAD Dragon Records is currently distributed by the Alternative Distribution Alliance (ADA/Warner).

On December 18, 2007, MAD Dragon Records' work with Hoots & Hellmouth won them the 2008 College Record Label Award from the Independent Music Awards (IMA). They won again in 2009 for their work with The Redwalls. They received over 15 IMA nominations in 2009 and 2010.

MAD Dragon worked with or put out records for artists such as Jules Shear, The Swimmers, Matt Duke, Andrew Lipke, Hoots and Hellmouth, Toy Soldiers, Kuf Knotz, The Spinning Leaves, Pretty Good Dance Moves, and The Redwalls.

== The Other MIP Entities ==
DraKo Booking is the booking agency responsible for booking regional, national and all types of tours around the United States for artists.

MADKo Concerts books and promotes independent concerts in the Philadelphia area featuring local artists.

MAD Dragon Publishing helps artists to place their music in film, commercials and television.

MAD Dragon Media, formerly known as Bantic Media and previously D3, is the MIP Entities' artist services company.

== See also ==
- List of record labels
