= Alex McNamara =

British actor, vocalist and drummer

Alex McNamara (born Alexander Beattie; 1 May 1979 in London) is a British actor, vocalist, and drummer most noted for his performances as Khashoggi in the West End production of We Will Rock You at the Dominion Theatre, and for being one of the lead vocalists with the hugely successful Australian Pink Floyd Show (2011–2015).

== Career ==
He attended Forest School in Walthamstow, where he completed GCSEs. During this time, he became the youngest ever accepted member of the National Youth Choir of Great Britain under Michael Brewer, and began his training as a singer and 'cellist. In 1995 he went on to study A-Levels in Music, English Literature and History at Bancroft's School in Woodford Green, Essex; whilst also attending the Guildhall School of Music and Drama on Saturdays and training as a classical singer under Mollie Petrie.

In 1999, he went on to study and gain a BA Hons degree in Drama from Middlesex University in North London, and in 2002 finally completed a year's postgraduate diploma in Musical Theatre at Mountview Academy of Theatre Arts in Wood Green.

In March 2005, McNamara auditioned for Queen legends Brian May and Roger Taylor and comedian/author Ben Elton for the West End production of We Will Rock You. He was offered the speaking ensemble role of Bob the Builder and first cover to the role of Khashoggi (played by Alex Bourne), which he accepted, and he joined the cast in April. Later in 2005, Alex took over the role of Khashoggi full-time for a period of almost three months when Bourne sustained an injury, and appeared numerous times in the role between 2005–2007, also performing live onstage with Brian and Roger on several occasions, including Freddie Mercury's 60th Birthday Anniversary, and ITV's Al Murray's Happy Hour.

In late 2010, McNamara was invited to join The Australian Pink Floyd Show as one of their vocalists, singing both backing and lead vocals. "Aussie Floyd" or TAPFS (as commonly abbreviated) are the world's biggest selling tribute act, and long-running testament to the iconic band Pink Floyd. In 2011, McNamara embarked on his first UK & European Tour with the band: playing celebrated venues such as the Eventim London Hammersmith Apollo, Liverpool's Echo Arena and the Manchester O2. The band's performance at Hammersmith in March was given a 4* review by David Sinclair in The Times. In June 2011, the band were joined onstage at the Hampton Court Palace Festival by bassist Guy Pratt of Pink Floyd, who sang a duet with Alex in the track Run Like Hell. A month later in July, TAPFS performed at the Chester Rocks Festival supporting Iggy and the Stooges. The band are due to tour the U.S. and Canada from October 2011, with another UK and European "Exposed in the Light" tour booked for 2012.

Songs he sang on the 2011 tour included "Time", "Wish You Were Here", "Dogs", "Breathe", "Coming Back to Life", and "Comfortably Numb".

In 2015, McNamara announced via his Facebook page that he had decided to leave the Australian Pink Floyd.

== Credits ==
=== Theatre ===
- Little Shop of Horrors
- Return to the Forbidden Planet
- Rent
- A Midsummer Night's Dream
- The Rocky Horror Show
- The Tempest
- The Rake's Return
- First Lady Suite

=== Events ===
- Backing singer for Bombay Bicycle Club, unplugged performance at The Union Chapel, Islington
- Vocalist & Presenter for Honda's live racing event, at the British International Motor Show (2008), ExCel London.

=== Commercials and corporate ===
- T-Mobile
- McDonald's
- A.X.A Insurance
- Metro Newspaper
- Only I.T Ltd
