= The Australian Pink Floyd Show =

Pink Floyd tribute band

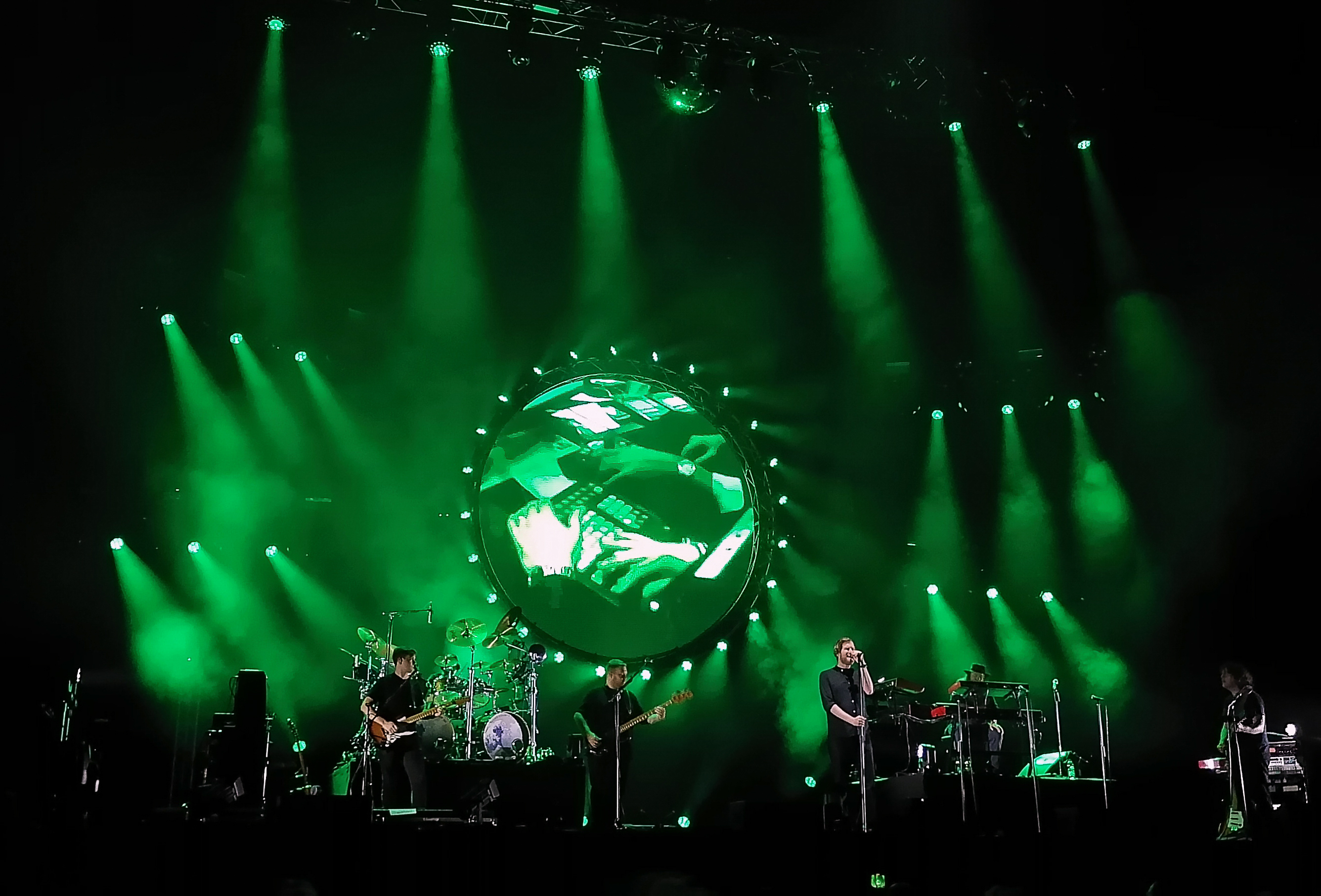
- The Australian Pink Floyd Show (2022)

Background information
- Origin: Adelaide, Australia
- Genres: Progressive rock, psychedelic rock
- Years active: 1988–present
- Label: Black Hill Pictures
- Members: Paul Bonney; David Domminney Fowler; Lorelei McBroom; Emily Lynn; Lara Smiles; Chris Barnes; Ricky Howard; Luc Ledy Lepine; Matt Riddle; Alex François; Chess Galea; Kelly Lamont
- Past members: Lee Smith; Grant Ross; Trevor Turton; Jason Sawford; Steve Mac; Peter Whiteley; Colin Wilson; Damian Darlington; Ian Cattell; Carl Brunsdon; Ola Bienkowska; Emily Gervers; Amy Smith; Jacquie Williams; Bobby Harrison; Arran Ahmun; Rob Stringer; Bianca Antoinette Glynn; Alex McNamara; Mike Kidson; David Parsons
- Website: aussiefloyd.com

The Australian Pink Floyd Show, more frequently referred to as the Australian Pink Floyd, is a Pink Floyd tribute band formed in 1988 in Adelaide, South Australia. Their live shows attempt to recreate the look, feel, and sound of Pink Floyd's later world tours, employing visual aids such as lasers, inflatables and a large display panel similar to the ones used by the original band. The Australian Pink Floyd Show plays venues worldwide.

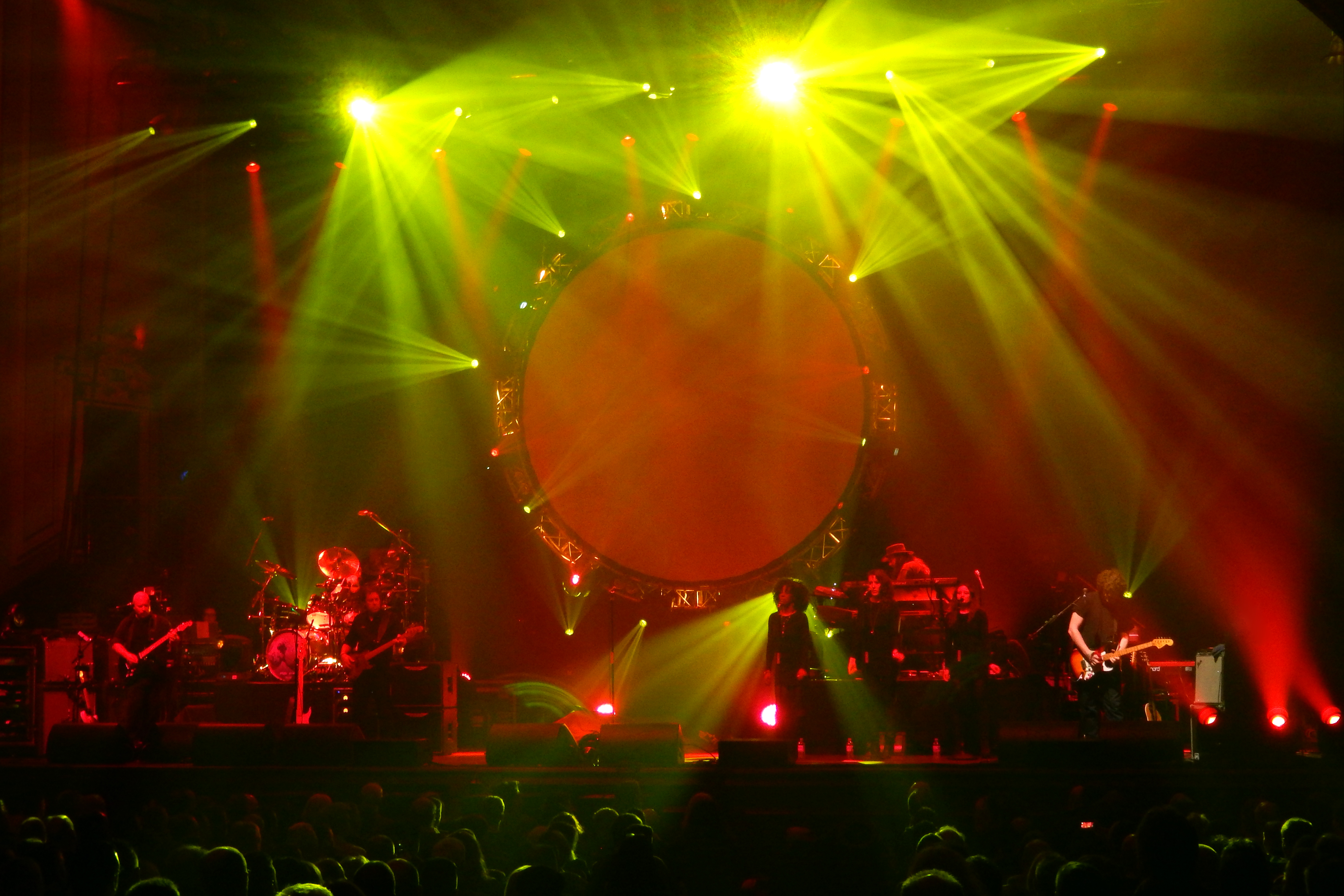
The Australian Pink Floyd Show performing in 2015

The band is noted for replicating the nuances of Pink Floyd's work. Steve Mac's guitar rig closely resembles David Gilmour's set-up, and includes elements custom-produced by Pete Cornish, who worked extensively with Gilmour. The band associates itself with individuals who have worked with Pink Floyd over the years, including Colin Norfield (who worked as a sound engineer for Gilmour in his solo career and for Pink Floyd during their 1994 Division Bell Tour) and Clive Brooks – Nick Mason's long-time drum technician.

The show includes a round screen with intelligent lights arranged around its perimeter. During a concert, movies and animations are displayed on-screen, complementing the band's light show. Inflatables (such as the pig used by Pink Floyd during the Division Bell Tour, and Skippy – the band's own giant pink kangaroo and named after the Australian TV series Skippy The Bush Kangaroo) are frequently employed in the band's shows.

== Band members ==
The current line up consists of:

- Paul Bonney – drums (1998–present)
- David Domminney Fowler – guitar, vocals (2010–present)
- Emily Lynn – backing vocals (2010–present)
- Lara Smiles – backing vocals (2010–present)
- Lorelei McBroom – backing vocals (2011–present)
- Chris Barnes – vocals (2015–present)
- Ricky Howard – bass guitar, vocals (2015–present)
- Luc Ledy-Lepine – guitar (2022–present)
- Matt Riddle – keyboards (2026–present)
- Alex François – saxophones (2022–present)
- Chess Galea - backing vocals (2025–present)
- Kelly Lamont - backing vocals (2025–present)

== History ==
=== 1988–2000 ===
The band was originally formed in 1988 in Adelaide, South Australia, by guitarist Lee Smith. Smith placed an advert in Allan's Music, a city music store, which read "Vocalist and Keyboardist required for band. Professional attitude expected. We only play Pink Floyd". Vocalist and guitarist Steve Mac, and keyboardist Jason Sawford joined the existing line up of Grant Ross (drummer), Trevor Turton (bass) and Smith (guitars). Their first live show was performed to a select group of family and friends. The band settled on the name "Think Floyd", and thereafter played a number of venues around Adelaide until the lack of a regular audience saw them drift apart.

By 1992, when Mac and Smith refocused efforts to bring Think Floyd to a larger audience, Turton had left the band. Peter Whiteley (bass/vocals) was auditioned and joined the band during rehearsals for an interstate tour of Australia's East coast due to take place the following year in May 1993. During the period of rehearsals, Mac visited family in the UK where he met with Glenn Povey, publisher of the most popular Pink Floyd fanzine of that time, 'Brain Damage'. During the meeting it was decided that Think Floyd should headline Povey's planned Pink Floyd fan convention to be held at Wembley in August 1993. The purpose of Think Floyd's 1993 East coast tour became one of raising funds for the band's trip to the UK. At the end of the East coast tour Whiteley left the band, and was replaced by bassist and vocalist Colin Wilson.

Think Floyd was renamed 'The Australian Pink Floyd Show' prior to their departure for England on 8 August 1993. TAPFS's first UK show was a hugely successful three-hour performance at Povey's Wembley convention. Such was the enthusiastic reception of TAPFS that Povey took responsibility for booking the band numerous shows in the UK throughout the remainder of 1993. Despite the immense success and growing popularity of TAPFS, its founding member Lee Smith left the band towards the end of that year and returned to Australia citing homesickness.

In 1994, David Gilmour attended an Australian Pink Floyd Show performance at the Fairfield Halls in Croydon. He subsequently invited the band to attend the end-of-tour after-show party for The Division Bell Tour at Earls Court in London.

The Australian Pink Floyd is the only Pink Floyd tribute act to play for a member of Pink Floyd; in 1996 they performed at David Gilmour's 50th birthday party.

In 1995, the band appeared on Irish national television, performing "Young Lust" on the chat show Kenny Live.

In 1998, the band played Glastonbury, performing on the acoustic stage.

=== 2000–2010 ===
In 2004, the band performed The Dark Side of the Moon at the King's Dock, Liverpool. The performance was recorded and released as a DVD the same year. This was released as a two-DVD set with the full concert on disc one and bonuses on disc two. Also in 2004, the band commenced a major tour of the United States, Canada, Germany, and Italy, including a show in Switzerland. The Liverpool Pops DVD (and more recently the 2004 Royal Albert Hall performance) has aired on television in the United States.

In 2005, the band released a CD of their renditions of Animals and Wish You Were Here at the Liverpool Pops Festival. In the same year the band undertook a two-week tour of South America consisting of dates in Mexico City, Buenos Aires, and Brazil. A documentary about the group was shot at the Bell Centre in Montreal, Quebec and broadcast in North America on the Discovery Channel in 2007.

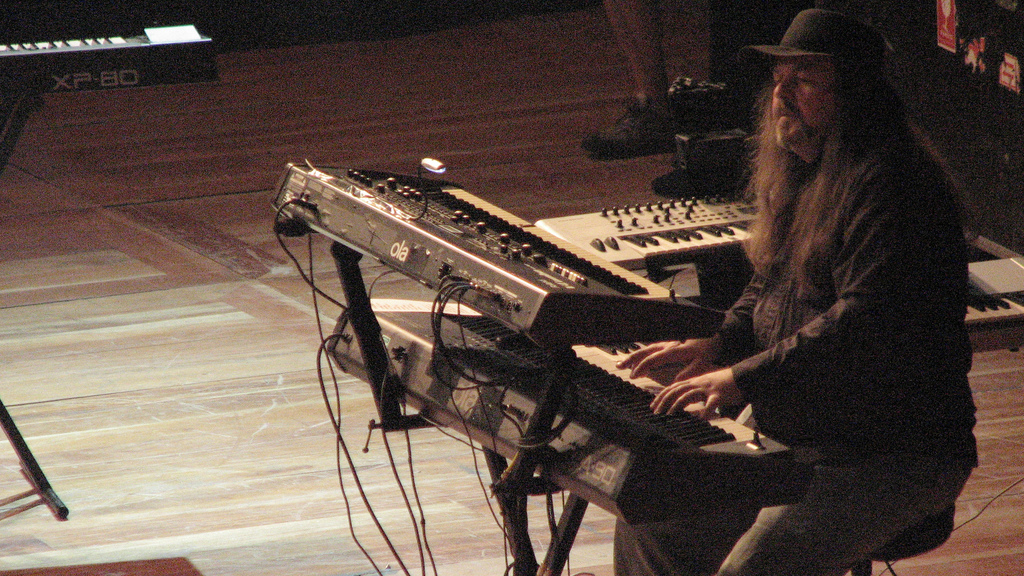
Jason Sawford performing at Teatro do Bourbon County in 2007

In 2007, the band performed at several major European Music Festivals, including the Sweden Rock Festival, the Malta Jazz Festival, the Arrow Rock Festival, Rock Werchter, and Festival do Sudoeste. A DVD of the band performing at the Royal Albert Hall in London in 2007 was released later that year.

In September 2007, the group commenced its longest ever continuous tour of the Americas, performing for the first time in Panama, Venezuela, and Chile. In the same month a performance of the show in Buenos Aires was aired on Argentine national television as part of the Pepsi music festival

Screen and inflatable pig used by the band in their 2008 shows

February 2008 saw the group commence their "Best of The Wall" tour in a five-week tour of Europe, performing in Spain, Luxembourg, Poland, Norway, and (for the first time) the Czech Republic and Israel.

The group performed at the Isle of Wight Festival in June 2008, were the headline act of the last night of Guilfest 2008, and in August of the same year made their first appearance at the Lokerse Feesten in Lokeren, Belgium.

The band played their first shows in Ukraine and Slovakia in September 2008.

A complete production of The Wall, incorporating new animation based on the original Gerald Scarfe imagery, was performed for the first time by the band during their 2008 North American tours. The production continued throughout the 2009 European tour, which included dates in the United Kingdom, Germany, Poland, the Czech Republic, Italy, Switzerland, Norway, Denmark, Sweden, France, Spain, Portugal and, for the first time, Serbia.

Mid 2009 saw the group perform for the first time in Austria at the Lovely Days Festival in Wiesen, and the Castle Clam Classic Rock Festival in Klam. In the June they were the closing act of the Bospop festival in the Netherlands.

Early 2010 saw the band commence its longest ever tour of Europe, playing in Croatia for the first time.

=== Since 2010 ===
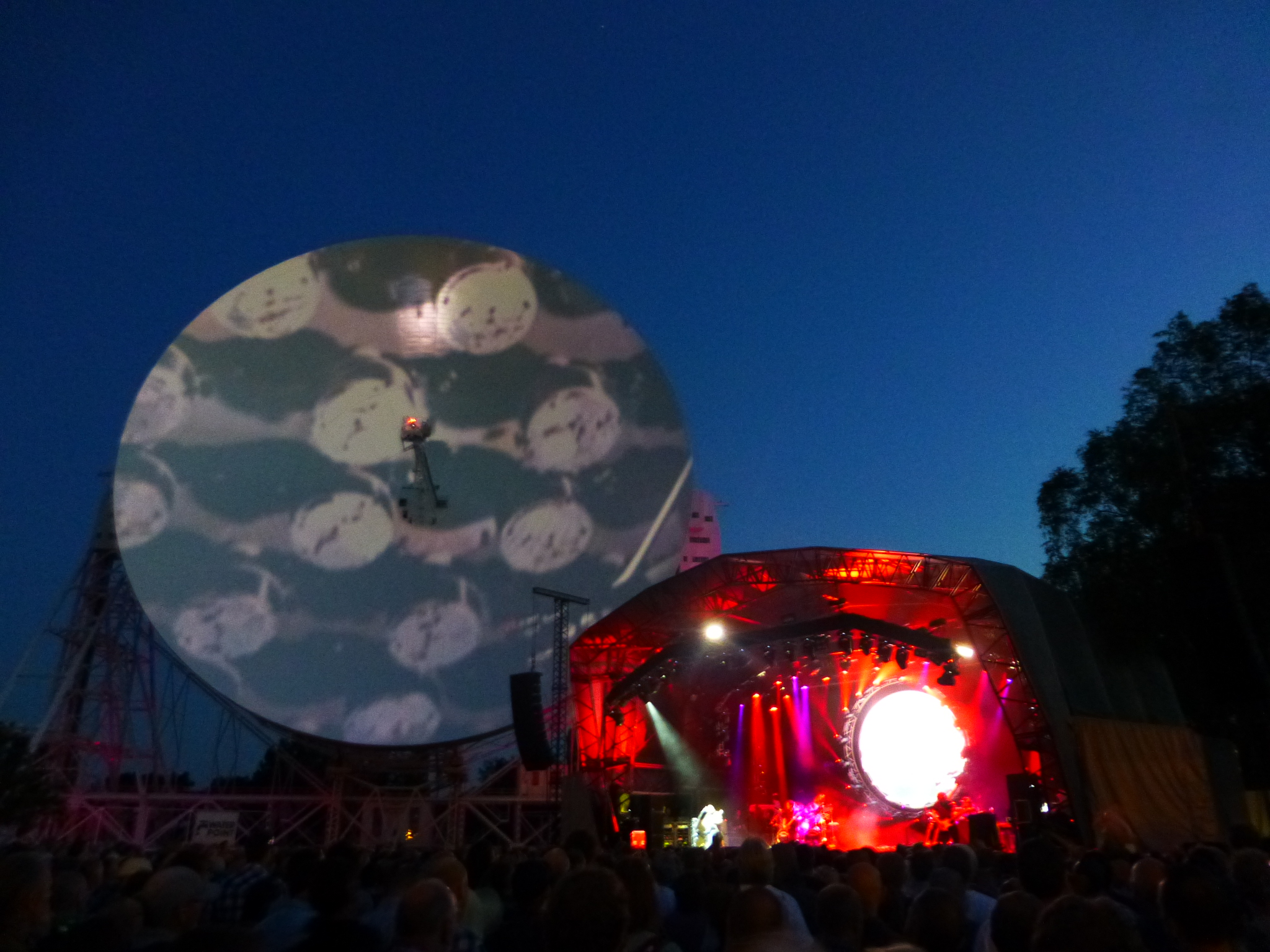
The band playing "The Dark Side of the Moon" in front of the Lovell Telescope at Jodrell Bank.

In 2010, new management was appointed and David Domminney Fowler was recruited as a guitarist, alongside vocalist Alex McNamara.

2011 saw the introduction of 3D stereoscopic projection and quadrophonic sound into the band's performances. The Australian Pink Floyd is the first ever band to implement stereographic 3D on tour.

Performing in June 2011 at the Hampton Court Palace Festival in London, the band was joined by Guy Pratt, long-time session bass player for Pink Floyd, for a rendition of Run Like Hell.

For the North American segment of their 2011 tour, the band added Lorelei McBroom as a backing vocalist. Lorelei had previously performed live with Pink Floyd on the Momentary Lapse of Reason tour in 1988 and 1989. At a show in Anaheim, Lorelei was joined by her sister Durga McBroom,-- she had sung for Pink Floyd on the Momentary Lapse and Division Bell tours – to sing The Great Gig in the Sky.

In 2012, the Australian Pink Floyd completed their Exposed in the Light tour. Lorelei McBroom rejoined the group for both the European and North American segments of the tour.

In 2013, the band toured Europe with their Eclipsed By The Moon tour, celebrating the 40th anniversary of The Dark Side of the Moon. In July 2013 the band played in front of the Lovell Telescope at Jodrell Bank in England.

In 2016, Chris Barnes (vocals) and Ricky Howard (bass/vocals) were welcomed to the TAPFS family.

2022 saw new members Luc Ledy-Lepine (guitar), and Alex Francois (saxophone) join the band.

On January, 9th, 2025, Jason Sawford died. The band announced his death on YouTube.

Matt Riddle joined on keyboards replacing founder member Jason Sawford.

Throughout 2025, backing vocalists Chess Galea and Kelly Lamont filled in for Lara Smiles.
