= Brenda Edwards =

English singer and television presenter (born 1969)

- Born: Brenda Claudina Susan Artman; 2 March 1969 (age 57); Luton, Bedfordshire, England
- Occupations: Singer; actress; television personality
- Television: The X Factor; Loose Women; Songs of Praise
- Children: 2, including Jamal
- Musical career
- Genres: Pop; musical theatre; gospel
- Years active: 1990s–present
- Website: brendaedwardsglobal.com

Brenda Claudina Susan Edwards (née Artman; born 2 March 1969) is an English singer, actress, television personality and presenter. In 2005, she was the ninth contestant eliminated on the second series of The X Factor. Since 2019, she has been a weekly panellist on the ITV daytime chat show Loose Women. In October 2020, Edwards, Charlene White, Judi Love and Kéllé Bryan became the first all black panel in the show's 25-year history; they have featured several times together. In January 2021, she became a presenter on the BBC One programme Songs of Praise.

== Early life ==
Brenda Claudina Susan Artman was born on 2 March 1969 in Luton, Bedfordshire, to a Saint Vincentian family. Edwards and her older brother Rodney were raised by relatives following the death of their parents in a car crash on 22 December 1974. Her grandmother, who was a member of the Church of God in Christ in Bury Park, encouraged her granddaughter to attend when she was eight, and Edwards soon discovered a love of music and singing, which led to her joining the Sunday school junior choir, and she soon became the choir mistress, as well as a member of the Pentecostal Collective Church of God in Christ (COGIC) mass choir.

Edwards eventually made the move from gospel to secular music, and at 18 she sang at local nightclubs, weddings, funerals and bar mitzvahs. Prior to finding a successful entertainment career, Edwards worked full-time in accounts.

== Career ==
=== 1990s: Career beginnings ===
Having provided vocals for a number of unsigned and small label recordings, Edwards then found some success on the 1996 track "Wiggly World Part Two" by Junior Jack (as Mr. Jack).

=== 2005: The X Factor ===
Edwards appeared in the second series of The X Factor in 2005. She was in the Over-25s category alongside Andy Abraham, Chico Slimani and Maria Lawson, and mentored by Sharon Osbourne. The first live show saw Edwards singing "Son of a Preacher Man". This was followed by performances of "Rescue Me" and "Midnight Train to Georgia". Performances of "I'm Outta Love" and "I'll Never Love This Way Again" won her a place in the semi-final, where she was voted out after her renditions of "Respect" and "Without You", with just 23 votes separating her and the act in third place.

=== 2007–2009: Musicals ===
After The X Factor, Edwards was chosen to play the role of Mama Morton in the hit West End musical Chicago, and her run in the show continued until March 2007. She was invited back to play Mama Morton over the Christmas period, between 10 December 2007 and 26 January 2008. She returned to play Mama Morton once again in November 2008, continuing in the role into early 2009.

In 2007, Edwards was cast as Pearl – a role created specifically for her – in a West End production of Carmen Jones at the Royal Festival Hall, from 25 July until 2 September 2007. The same year, she won the Favourite Reality Star award at the 2007 Screen Nation awards. In 2009, Edwards toured the UK in the Queen musical We Will Rock You as Killer Queen.

=== 2010–present: Stage roles and Loose Women ===
On 21 June 2010, she started her role as Killer Queen in the West End production of We Will Rock You, replacing Mazz Murray, who was on maternity leave. Edwards took two weeks off to appear in another West End musical, and then returned.

In 2010, Edwards announced she would release her debut album in 2011. The first single from the album was titled "You Know How To Love Me", taken from the musical When Midnight Strikes by Charles Miller and Kevin Hammonds. It received its radio premiere on BBC Radio 2 and was released on 15 November 2010.

In 2012, Edwards appeared as blues singer Bessie Smith in a workshop of a musical about her life. The following year, Edwards played Mrs Johnson in The Wright Way, a sitcom on BBC One. In 2014, she played a commentator only seen as a giant pair of lips in the Alan Carr interactive gameshow The Singer Takes It All. Between 2015 and 2016, Edwards toured the UK and Ireland in the musical Hairspray, playing Motormouth Maybelle. In 2017, she returned to tour the UK and Ireland again with Hairspray, reprising her role as Motormouth Maybelle.

Between February and March 2019, Edwards was a guest panellist on ITV's Loose Women. She was then brought in as a regular panelist to fill in for Linda Robson. Robson returned in early 2020; however, Edwards has remained on the panel ever since, making weekly appearances on the show.

In July 2019, it was announced that Edwards would be playing the lead role of Delores Van Cartier in the forthcoming UK tour and West End revival of Sister Act: The Musical, with Whoopi Goldberg confirming that the part was being revised specifically to allow Edwards to play the role after being rejected from the original UK casting for being "too old". (The original versions had Delores as a 23-year-old, contrary to the older character portrayed in the movie from which the musical was based.)

In January 2021, Edwards joined the BBC's Songs of Praise.

In June 2022, Edwards portrayed Matron "Mama" Morton in the UK tour of Chicago, as a replacement for Gemma Collins, who had been forced to withdraw from the role due to a knee injury.

In November 2025, Edwards originated the role of Tanya in the West End production of Paddington: The Musical.

== Personal life ==
Edwards has two children, Jamal (1990–2022) and Tanisha, from a previous relationship. Jamal was the creator of SB.TV and owned Just Jam, a subsidiary Sony record label, until his death in 2022. She told Coleen Nolan that he died holding her hand. In 2011, Edwards and Jamal featured in an advert for Google Chrome.

Edwards has had stage III breast cancer, and survived domestic violence at the hands of a former partner.
