= Peter Johansson (musician) =

Swedish actor-singer (born 1977)

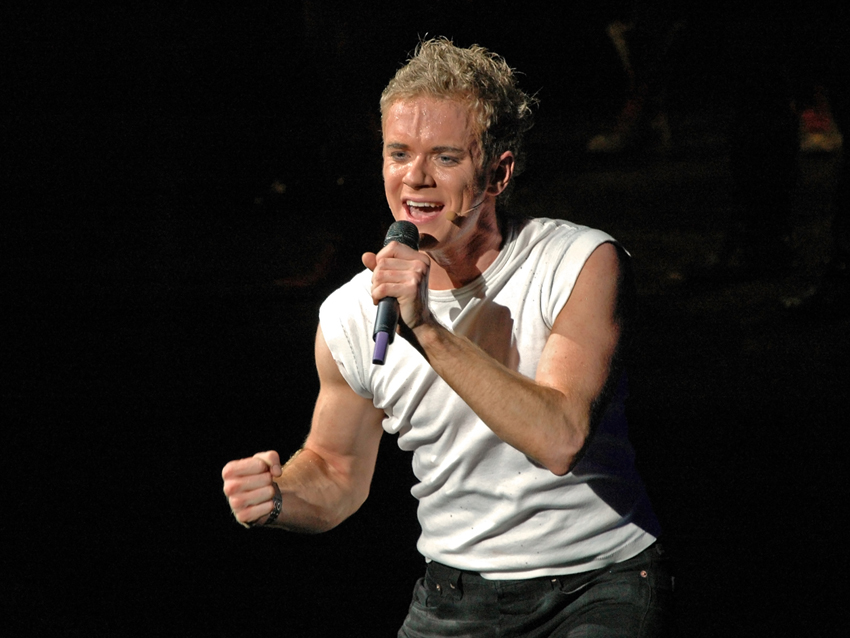
Peter Johansson

Peter Johansson (born 22 August 1977 in Norrköping, Sweden) is a Swedish singer, actor, pianist, guitarist, dancer and musical artist. He was educated at School of musical theatre, Bjärnum and Ballet Academy, conservatory of musical theatre, Gothenburg, Sweden.

From 1998 to 2005, Peter Johansson played guitar in power metal band Axenstar.

He has participated in the German production of Saturday Night Fever in Cologne, Germany in 2001–2002 and A Chorus Line at the Gothenburg Opera, Sweden, in 2002–2003.

From April 2003 to September 2007 Peter Johansson performed in the Queen musical We Will Rock You in West End, London. From June 2005 he made the leading role Galileo. On leaving the show he was given a gold disc and a special We Will Rock You guitar – a variation of the Queen guitarist Brian May’s Red Special – for his efforts.

In 2006–2007 filmmakers Magnus Roudén and Gunnar Ernblad made a documentary for Swedish television about Peter Johansson in London (We Will Rock You) and in Sweden (Rhapsody In Rock, church concerts, Footloose etc.).

In 2007 he moved back to Sweden to perform in Footloose at Stora Teatern in Gothenburg. The musical was also given in Stockholm in 2008.

Since 2008 Johansson has toured with several different shows in Sweden including Champions of Rock, Rock of Ages, Jesus Christ Superstar and Jersey Boys.
