= We Will Rock You (musical) =

Musical based on the songs of Queen

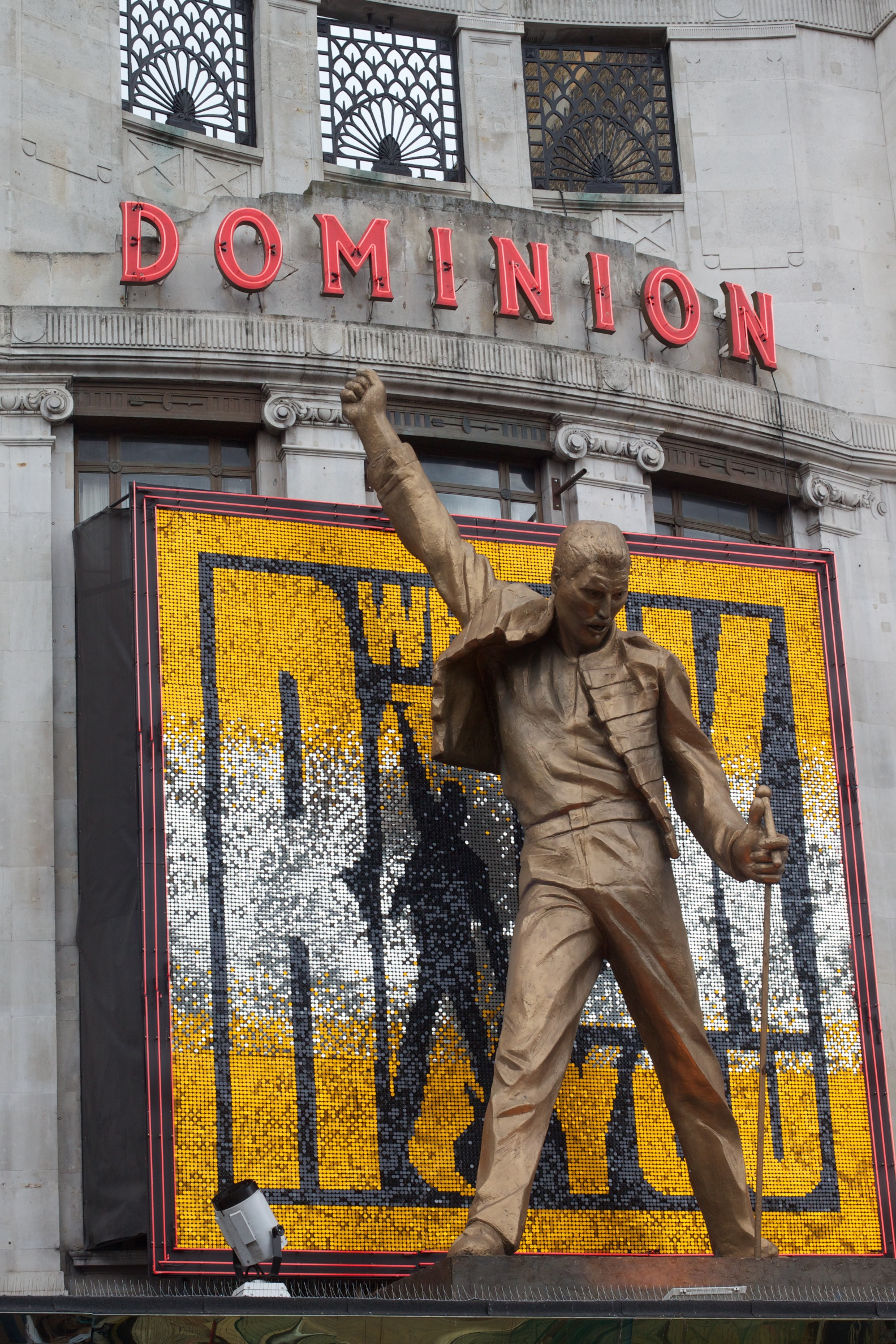
- We Will Rock You at the Dominion Theatre, London
- Music: Queen
- Lyrics: Queen
- Book: Ben Elton
- Productions: 2002 West End; 2009 UK tour 2010 UK tour 2013 10th anniversary tour 2019 North America tour 2019 UK tour 2023 West End
- Awards: Laurence Olivier Award for Most Popular Show

We Will Rock You (often abbreviated as WWRY) is a jukebox musical based on the songs of British rock band Queen with a book by Ben Elton. The musical tells the story of a renegade group known as the Bohemians who struggle to restore the free exchange of thought and culture in a vaguely Orwellian society.

Directed by Christopher Renshaw and choreographed by Arlene Phillips, the original West End production opened in 2002. Although the musical was at first panned by critics, it has become an audience favourite, becoming the longest-running musical at the Dominion Theatre, celebrating its tenth anniversary on 14 May 2012.

The original production closed on 31 May 2014, at that time the eleventh longest-running musical in West End history. Numerous international and touring productions have followed, and We Will Rock You has been seen in six of the world's continents. By December 2022 the musical had been seen by 20 million people across 28 countries.

From 2 June to 27 August 2023, We Will Rock You returned to the West End for a 12-week run at the London Coliseum.

== Development ==
According to Brian May, Queen's manager Jim Beach had spoken with the band about creating a jukebox musical with Queen's songs since the mid-1990s. Initially, the intent was to create a biographical story of Freddie Mercury. About this time, Robert De Niro's production company Tribeca Productions expressed interest in a Queen musical, but it found the original idea difficult to work with.

In 2000, Ben Elton was approached to start talks with May and Taylor on the project. He suggested taking the musical down a different path than initially imagined, creating an original story that would capture the spirit of much of their music. He worked closely with May and Taylor to incorporate Queen's songs into the story. Elton has also stated that he was in part inspired by the computer-controlled dystopia of the 1999 science-fiction film The Matrix. The script was eventually completed midway through 2001.

== Productions ==
=== West End and UK tours ===
We Will Rock You opened in the West End at the Dominion Theatre on 14 May 2002, following previews from 26 April. It was directed by Christopher Renshaw and choreographed by Arlene Phillips, with musical supervision and vocal arrangements by Mike Dixon. The production featured a nine-piece live band. The cast included Tony Vincent as Galileo, Hannah Jane Fox as Scaramouche, Sharon D. Clarke as Killer Queen, Nigel Planer as Pop, Nigel Clauzel as Brit and Kerry Ellis as Meat. For her performance, Clarke was nominated for "Best Performance in a Supporting Role in a Musical or Entertainment" at the 2003 Olivier Awards. Notable cast replacements included Mig Ayesa, Alex Gaumond, Ricardo Alfonso and Peter Murphy as Galileo, Mazz Murray and Brenda Edwards as Killer Queen, and Rachel Tucker as Meat. In 2005 We Will Rock You became the longest-running musical at the Dominion Theatre, surpassing the previous record-holder Grease. The production closed on 31 May 2014, shortly after its 12th anniversary, and after 4,600 performances at the Dominion Theatre.

A UK tour was launched in 2009 at the Palace Theatre, Manchester. The cast included Gaumond as Galileo, Sarah French-Ellis as Scaramouche, Edwards as Killer Queen, Georgina Hagen as Meat, Jonathan Wilkes as Khashoggi and Kevin Kennedy as Pop. A second UK tour launched in December 2010, also at the Palace Theatre in Manchester. The show embarked on a further UK and Ireland tour, beginning at the Bromley Churchill Theatre, on 16 September 2019. After a hiatus due to the COVID-19 pandemic, the tour resumed performances on 7 February 2022 at the Kings Theatre in Portsmouth, closing on 10 September 2022 at the Palace Theatre in Manchester.

Following the UK tour, the show returned to the West End in 2023, opening at the London Coliseum on 2 June for a limited 12-week run directed by Ben Elton and choreographed by Jacob Fearey. Ian McIntosh and Elena Skye resumed the roles of Galileo and Scaramouche respectively from the touring production, and Brenda Edwards continued as Killer Queen. Also joining the cast were Lee Mead as Khashoggi, Christine Allado as Meat, and Adrian Hansel as Brit. Ben Elton made his stage debut as the Rebel Leader (previously known as Pop).

=== Australasia and the Asian Pacific ===
The first international production premiered at the Regent Theatre in Melbourne, Australia, on 7 August 2003. The cast included Michael Falzon as Galileo, Kate Hoolihan as Scaramouche, Annie Crummer as Killer Queen, and Amanda Harrison as Oz. The production closed on 4 March 2004 before touring to Perth, Brisbane and Sydney. It then made a stop at the Shinjuku Koma Theater in Tokyo, Japan, where it ran from 27 May to 24 August 2005 with Peter Murphy as Galileo and Pippa Grandison as Scaramouche. A second tour launched in 2006, performing in Tokyo and Osaka.

An Australasian tour was launched at the end of 2007 in New Zealand; the cast included Ayesa as Galileo and Crummer as Killer Queen. The tour performed in Auckland at The Civic, The Edge (26 October to 2 December 2007), in Seoul, South Korea, at the Seongnam Arts Centre (2 to 24 February 2008), in Singapore at the Esplanade Theatre (28 March to 27 April 2008), in Hong Kong at The Lyric Theatre of The Hong Kong Academy for Performing Arts (16 May to 22 June 2008) and in Bangkok, Thailand, at the Muangthai Ratchadalai Theatre (12 to 27 July 2008).

A new tour of Australia commenced in Sydney on 30 April 2016, before touring to Brisbane and Melbourne. Another production was scheduled for 2023-2024. It was supposed to have over 500 cast members including Courtney Act as Killer Queen and Peter Rowsthorn as Buddy. In October 2022 it was announced that the tour was cancelled because of legal reasons.

=== Spain ===
A Spanish-language production ran from 1 October 2003 (opening officially on 3 November) to 30 May 2004 at Teatro Calderón, Madrid, with Momo Cortés and Miquel Fernández as Galileo. The songs "We Will Rock You", "We Are the Champions" and "Bohemian Rhapsody" retained their English lyrics. After closing at Teatro Calderón, the show toured around Spain. In 2007 the production returned to Teatro Calderón with previews from 23 January and an official opening on 12 February. Daniel Diges and Julián Fontalvo shared the role of Galileo. The production closed on 6 January 2008.

A new production began previews on 9 October 2021 at the Gran Teatro Príncipe Pío in Madrid, and officially opened on 24 November.

=== Las Vegas and North American tours ===
A resident production at the Paris Las Vegas hotel and casino in Las Vegas, Nevada, began previews on 4 August 2004, with an official opening on 8 September. Tony Vincent, who originated the role of Galileo in London, reprised the role, which he alternated with Jason Wooten. Aspen Miller and Kacie Sheik shared the role of Scaramouche, Patti Russo was Killer Queen, and Ty Taylor was Brit. The Las Vegas production "trimmed" down the book into a single act show. The production closed on 27 November 2005.

On 15 October 2013, a North American tour began at the Hippodrome Theatre in Baltimore, Maryland, directed by Elton. The cast included Brian Justin Crum as Galileo, Ruby Lewis as Scaramouche, PJ Griffith as Khashoggi, Jacqueline Arnold as Killer Queen, Jared Zirilli as Britney, Ryan Knowles as Buddy and Erica Peck as Oz. The tour covered nearly the whole of the US, and two stops in Ontario, Canada; in all, the tour included 298 performances in 29 cities.

A second North American tour launched on 3 September 2019 at the Centennial Concert Hall in Winnipeg, Manitoba, Canada, and included a stop at the Madison Square Garden in New York City from 14 to 17 November 2019.

=== Russia, Germany, Switzerland and Austria ===
A Russian production opened in the Estrada Theatre, Moscow on 17 October 2004. The production's dialogue and all songs but three were translated into Russian, by Evgeny Margulis of Mashina Vremeni. This production closed only four months after its opening due to disagreements between the show's producers, despite fan protests to keep the show going.

A German production opened in the Musical Dome, Cologne, on 12 December 2004. The spoken dialogue was in German, but the musical numbers consisted of a mix of German and English lyrics. According to Brian May, Ben Elton intended German to represent the show's "present day", and English represented the distant past. The production closed in Cologne on 30 September 2008. It next opened at the Apollo Theatre in Stuttgart on 13 November 2008 after previews from 7 November 2008. The production opened in Berlin on 21 October 2010 and closed for good on 21 October 2011.

A German-language production opened in Zürich, Switzerland, on 3 December 2006 at Theatre Stadthof 11, Oerlikon using the book of the Cologne production. The production starred Jessica Kessler as Scaramouche, Brigitte Oelke as Killer Queen and Rachel Fischer as Ozzy. This production closed at the end of 2007. It reopened in Vienna, Austria, on 24 January 2008, at the Raimund Theatre where it ran until 13 July 2008.

Another tour started in December 2012 in Basel, Switzerland, and closed in June 2013 in Essen, Germany. It restarted in September 2014 in Munich, followed by Frankfurt and Vienna.

From 17 July to 25 August 2024 a production ran at AVB Kultur & Freizeit in Amstetten, Austria.

Stage Entertainment Germany announced a new production of the musical, which will open on October 17, 2025, at the Stage Palladium Theater in Stuttgart. Author Ben Elton has reworked the book for the Stuttgart production in an attempt to better integrate the musical into the digital age. For example, the character name “Commander Khashoggi” has been changed to “Commander Zuckermusk.” The leading roles are played by Kasper Nilsson (Galileo), Sjoerd Anne van der Meer (Alternate Galileo), Isabell Waltsgott (Scaramouche), Aisata Blackman (Killer Queen) and Christian Schöne (Zuckermusk)

=== South Africa ===
A South African production opened at the Civic Theatre in Johannesburg on 9 May 2006. It starred Francois Schreuder as Galileo, Helen Burger as Scaramouche, Vicky Sampson as Killer Queen, and Helen Goldberg as Oz. The production made tour stops at the Artscape in Cape Town (from 25 July) and the Playhouse Opera in Durban (29 September to 29 October 2006) before closing.

=== Canada ===
A Canadian production began previews on 14 March and officially opened on 10 April 2007 at the Canon Theatre, Toronto. Yvan Pednault played Galileo. Erica Peck was Scaramouche, Alana Bridgewater was Killer Queen, Suzie McNeil was Oz and Evan Buliung was Khashoggi. The production closed at the Canon Theatre on 11 May 2008 and reopened at the Panasonic Theatre on 16 July 2008 after major rewrites to trim the show. Cuts included dialogue between "Ga-Ga" and "I Want to Break Free"; "One Vision" was cut; and the Act Two song sequence was changed. In October 2008, Camilla Scott took over the role of Khashoggi, a character that had previously been portrayed as a male. The production closed on 28 June 2009.

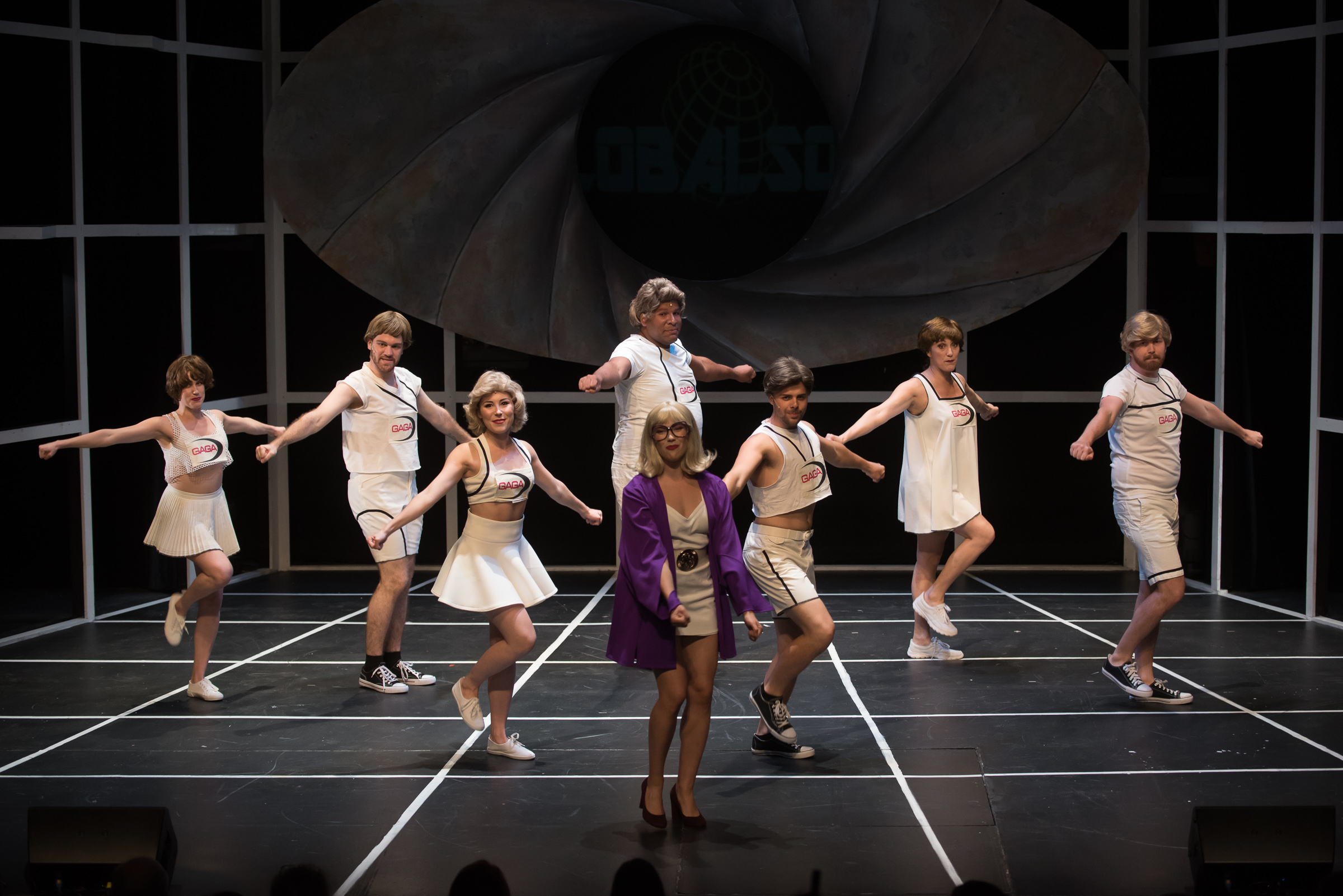
The cast at Magnus Theatre performs "Radio Gaga" (2017)

Another production opened at the Magnus Theatre in Thunder Bay, Ontario, on 8 September 2017. It played to sold-out audiences and was extended, closing on 30 September 2017.

A French-language production opened on 1 May 2025 at Théâtre Saint-Denis in Montreal, Quebec. Pierre-Olivier Grondin is Galileo, Frédérique Cyr-Deschênes is Scaramouche, Annie Villeneuve is Killer Queen, Patrick Olafson is Khashoggi, Benoît Finley is Ozzy, Laurence Champagne is Axl (also known as Meat in previous productions) and Martin Rouette is Brit. The run in Montreal closed on 18 May 2025, but this production is scheduled to visit Quebec City’s Théâtre du Capitole from 20 June to 13 July 2025, Trois-Rivières’s Amphitéâtre Cogeco on 5 and 6 September 2025 and finally Gatineau’s Théâtre du Casino du Lac-Leamy from 2 October to 19 October 2025.

=== Other productions ===
In April 2007 a non-equity production of We Will Rock You began at the Jedlicka Performing Art Centre in Chicago.

An Italian production opened on 4 December 2009 at the Allianz Teatro in Milan, Italy. All the dialogues are in Italian and almost all the songs are in English, except for "Radio Ga Ga" and "No One But You". The tour visited Milan, Bologna, Trieste and Rome.

From 12 September to 18 December 2010 a production was played in Stockholm, Sweden at the venue Cirkus. The production moved to Oslo, Norway on 23 January 2011 at Folketeateret. It closed on 16 April 2011.

A production of the show opened on 23 April 2015 on board the new Royal Caribbean cruise ship, Anthem of the Seas.

An Icelandic production opened on 15 August 2019 at the Háskólabíó Theater in Reykjavík, Iceland. The spoken dialogue and most lyrics were translated into Icelandic by Jóhann Axel Andersen. Directed by Vignir Rafn Valþórsson, with Chantelle Carey as choreographer, the cast included Kristinn Óli Haraldsson as Galileo and Þórhallur Sigurðsson as Pop.

A French production opened on 28 September 2018 at the Casino de Paris in Paris, directed by Ned Grujic, with choreography by Raffaele Lucania.

An international tour will start in the Philippines on 27 October 2022, with scheduled stops in South Korea, Singapore, and South Africa.

A new Italian tour kicked off on 2 February 2023 at the Teatro Nazionale in Milan, starring Martha Rossi as Scaramouche, Damiano Borgi as Galileo, Natascia Fonzetti as Killer Queen, Salvo Bruno as Khashoggi, Mattia Braghero as Brit, Alessandra Ferrari as Oz and Massimiliano Colonna as Pop.

A Polish non-replica version, directed by Wojciech Kępczyński and translated by Michał Wojnarowski, premiered on 15 April 2023 in Roma Musical Theater in Warsaw, Poland. The last, 417th spectacle was performed on 26 January 2025.

Since 2006, the show has been licensed for amateur and school productions in the UK, with proceeds going to the Mercury Phoenix Trust.

== Critical reception ==
London's critics almost uniformly panned the show, criticising the concept and direction. The Guardian wrote that the premise "really is as sixth form as it sounds", called the production "ruthlessly packaged and manufactured" and opined that the "sometimes funny" libretto existed mainly to "devise more unlikely ways to wring out another Queen song." The Daily Mirror wrote that "Ben Elton should be shot for this risible story." The Daily Telegraph described it as "guaranteed to bore you rigid" and "prolefeed at its worst." However, some individual performances received praise.

== Characters and casts ==
Character	West End (2002)	Australia (2003)	Las Vegas (2004)	Toronto (2007)	First UK tour (2009)	North American tour (2019)	West End (2023)
Galileo	Tony Vincent	Michael Falzon	Tony Vincent; Jason Wooten	Yvan Pedneault	Alex Gaumond	Trevor Coll	Ian McIntosh
Scaramouche	Hannah Jane Fox	Kate Hoolihan	Aspen Miller; Kacie Sheik	Erica Peck	Sarah French-Ellis	Keri Kelly	Elena Skye
Killer Queen	Sharon D. Clarke	Annie Crummer	Patti Russo	Alana Bridgewater	Brenda Edwards	Krystle Chance	Brenda Edwards
Khashoggi	Alexander Hanson	Ross Girven	Rich Hebert	Evan Buliung	Jonathan Wilkes	Kyle Gruninger	Lee Mead
Brit	Nigel Clauzel	Jason Chong	Ty Taylor	Sterling Jarvis	Wayne Robinson	Brian Christensen	Adrian Hansel
Meat / Oz	Kerry Ellis	Amanda Harrison	Carly Thomas	Suzie McNeil	Georgina Hagen	Alysse Ernewein	Christine Allado
Pop / Buddy / Rebel Leader	Nigel Planer	Robert Grubb	Douglas Crawford	Jack Langedijk	Kevin Kennedy	Kevin Doe	Ben Elton

=== Notable replacements ===
==== West End ====
- Galileo: MiG Ayesa, Peter Johansson, Ricardo Afonso, Alex Gaumond, Noel Sullivan, David Leigh (u/s), Oliver Tompsett
- Scaramouche: Jenna Lee-James, Sabrina Aloueche, Lauren Samuels, Amanda Harrison (u/s), Tamara Wall (u/s), Emma Hatton (u/s)
- Killer Queen: Mazz Murray
- Khashoggi: Clive Carter, Alex McNamara
- Meat: Rachael Wooding, Rachel Tucker, Rachel John, Tamara Wall (u/s), Rebecca Trehearn (u/s)
- Pop: Jeff Shankley, Kevin Kennedy

==== UK Tour ====
- Galileo: Michael Falzon, Noel Sullivan
- Killer Queen: Ashley J Russell
- Khashoggi: Darren Day, Rhydian Roberts, Earl Carpenter, Jonathan Wilkes
- Brit: Leon Lopez
- Pop: Ian Reddington

== Plot ==
=== Act One ===
The story is set exactly 300 years in the future in a vaguely Orwellian world. Earth has been renamed as the "iPlanet" (sometimes called "Planet Mall" in older productions) and is controlled by the Globalsoft Corporation ("Innuendo"). On the iPlanet, mainstream commercial conformity reigns, in which Ga Ga Kids watch the same movies, listen to computer-generated music, wear the same clothes and hold the same thoughts and opinions. Musical instruments are forbidden, and rock music is unknown ("Radio Ga Ga").

In the newest graduating class is black sheep Galileo, who has dreams and hears strange words in his head, most of which are lyrics of songs long since lost, though he does not understand their significance. Despite his teacher's advice, Galileo refuses to conform like the rest of his classmates ("I Want to Break Free"). He is captured by Khashoggi, commander of Globalsoft's police. The teacher also reveals a second anomaly, a young goth woman named Scaramouche who is openly mocked and derided by her peers ("Somebody to Love"). She, too is arrested by Khashoggi.

Ruling Globalsoft Corporation is Killer Queen ("Killer Queen"). She has heard of a prophecy that instruments have been hidden somewhere on the iPlanet in the "place of living rock", and a "bright star" will show the way to them. She orders Khashoggi to get to the bottom of the matter and crush the rebel Bohemians who believe in the prophecy. Killer Queen then basks in her power over the iPlanet ("Play the Game").

Galileo and Scaramouche wake up in a hospital. They realise that they are kindred spirits, feared by the rest of their society. ("Under Pressure") They flee together from the hospital. Khashoggi has blown up all the rocks on the iPlanet, but cannot find any supposed hidden instruments. Killer Queen insists that they have won, and the prophecy will not come to pass ("A Kind of Magic").

On the streets, Bohemians Britney and Oz climb out of the sewers, where they have been gathering materials to make musical instruments. Britney is a believer in the Dreamer who will fulfil the prophecy, and insists to the cynical Oz that it's the key to bringing real music back into the world ("I Want It All"). Brit and Oz hear footsteps approaching, and hide.

Galileo and Scaramouche arrive, with Galileo talking about his belief that he has a destiny. He says that he dreamt a name for the woman: "Scaramouche". Britney and Oz reveal themselves, and accuse Galileo and Scaramouche of being spies, because Galileo keeps spouting words of the "sacred text". Galileo insists that he only hears those words in his head. Britney tests him, singing the first few lines of "Bohemian Rhapsody". Galileo responds correctly with the subsequent lines, and Britney realises that he is the Dreamer of the prophecy. They bring Galileo and Scaramouche to the Heartbreak Hotel, which is located at the ruins of the Tottenham Court Road tube station, where the Bohemians have made their home ("Headlong").

The Bohemians explain to Galileo and Scaramouche that they take their names after singers long gone, and mourn the deaths of those who died young ("No One But You"). The group then celebrates the reason rock bands started playing music in the first place, which was for love ("Crazy Little Thing Called Love").

Khashoggi and his police suddenly arrive at the Heartbreak Hotel, where they round up the Bohemians for capture. Britney breaks free and battles the police in order to enable Galileo and Scaramouche to escape, but is killed in the process.

=== Act Two ===
The Ga Ga Kids of the iPlanet move on in their regular fashion ("One Vision").

Galileo and Scaramouche have escaped the Heartbreak Hotel, and realise that back at the hospital, tracking devices were installed in their heads. They remove them, and upon realising that they are all that's left of the rebels, they confess their love for each other ("Who Wants to Live Forever").

The surviving Bohemians have been rounded up by Khashoggi to be tortured ("Flash"). When he cannot get any information from them about the prophecy, he has them brain-drained ("Seven Seas of Rhye"—interpolating "Lazing on a Sunday Afternoon").

Galileo wakes up, and tells Scaramouche that he had a dream that the Bohemians were sent to the Seven Seas of Rhye. Scaramouche agrees they have to go there, but then Galileo insists that she stay because she's a "chick", to which Scaramouche takes offence. They argue, and decide that both of them will go to the Seven Seas of Rhye, but their relationship will be purely professional.

Back at Globalsoft headquarters ("Fat Bottomed Girls") Khashoggi reports that the Bohemians are no longer a problem. Killer Queen prematurely starts to celebrate ("Don't Stop Me Now"). Khashoggi interrupts her, explaining that Galileo and Scaramouche escaped. Killer Queen declares this is the last time Khashoggi has disappointed her, and has him brain-drained ("Another One Bites the Dust").

Galileo and Scaramouche are making their way to the Seven Seas of Rhye, arguing all the way ("Hammer to Fall"). At the Seven Seas of Rhye pub in Montreux, Pop the librarian is serving drinks to the lifeless Bohemians ("These Are the Days of Our Lives"). When Galileo and Scaramouche arrive, Pop explains the full nature of the prophecy to them as inscribed by the three remaining members of the band Queen just before they were sentenced to death (Brian May, his last request being a final guitar solo, apparently delayed his execution for three and a half days). Scaramouche figures out that the bright shining star of the prophecy is rock star Freddie Mercury's statue, and that it's pointing to Wembley Stadium, the "place of living rock". After initially preparing to travel by bicycle, (opening of "Bicycle Race") Scaramouche protests that the method "isn't very cool", and so they travel there by motorcycle. ("Headlong [reprise]")

Wembley Stadium is in ruins, with no instruments to be found. Reconciling and their love for each other rekindled ("Love of My Life"), Scaramouche inspires Galileo to perform the opening of "We Will Rock You", and an electric guitar is revealed. Galileo cannot play it, but Scaramouche can ("Brighton Rock solo"). Pop hacks into Globalsoft's network so their music can be heard by everyone on the iPlanet, and Killer Queen is defeated ("Tie Your Mother Down", "We Will Rock You/We Are the Champions").

After the curtain calls ("We Will Rock You [fast version]"), the entire company performs "Bohemian Rhapsody" as an encore.

=== Variations ===
International productions of the musical feature changes in the story and song line-up in order to better reach target audiences. All the main characters retain their general personalities across productions, but the names vary depending on the production. (See characters section below.)

The dialogue contains many references to popular culture, with lyrics from numerous non-Queen songs and albums inserted into the text. These references are constantly changing and, according to writer Elton, this is to keep the show "fresh". Songs that have been referenced include The Beatles' "Help!", "Strawberry Fields Forever", "Penny Lane", "Lucy in the Sky with Diamonds", "I Am the Walrus" and "Hello, Goodbye", Little Richard's "Tutti Fruitti" and "Long Tall Sally", the theme from The Wombles, The Goodies' "Funky Gibbon", Bruce Springsteen's "Born to Run", David Bowie's "Rebel Rebel" and "Space Oddity", The Wild Ones' "Wild Thing", The Rolling Stones' "Honky Tonk Women", Bob Dylan's "Mr. Tambourine Man", ABBA's "Dancing Queen" and "Fernando", Oasis' "(What's the Story) Morning Glory?", Eminem's "The Real Slim Shady", Spice Girls' "Wannabe", Elton John's "Goodbye Yellow Brick Road", Black Lace's "Agadoo", The Clash's "Complete Control", Teletubbies and songs by Amy Winehouse and Michael Jackson.

May often performed with the London production on special occasions such as anniversaries and Freddie Mercury's birthday. At the final performance of the original production in 2014, he and Roger Taylor both performed.

Hannah Jane Fox, who originated Scaramouche, was the last original principal cast member to remain with the show. She gave her final performance on 28 January 2006, four years after the musical opened at the Dominion Theatre, and the event was celebrated with May appearing on stage to perform the guitar solo during the "Bohemian Rhapsody" encore.

On 5 September 2006, the London show celebrated what would have been Freddie Mercury's 60th birthday. During the song "Don't Stop Me Now", ordinarily sung by Killer Queen, the band "McFly" (who were at No. 1 with the song on the singles charts the previous week) emerged onto the stage to sing it instead. Brian May and Roger Taylor joined the encore, performing Taylor's "Say It's Not True" as a duo. Ben Elton also addressed the audience on this special occasion. The following week, tickets to the London show went on sale from £19.46, Mercury's birth year.

On 14 May 2007, the London show celebrated its fifth anniversary with a special show featuring both May and Taylor playing in the final section of the show. Writer Ben Elton also made an appearance to present a special plaque to the cast, May and Taylor. During the portion of the show based in Pop's bar, the line "But the Pub Landlord has a Bike" was followed by a cameo appearance of British comedian Al Murray, who came up through the stage on a motorcycle.

The London show's sixth anniversary performance was held on 21 May 2008, a week after its actual anniversary due to the unavailability of Brian May. For the first time since the show opened, the Killer Queen character performed the entire song "Don't Stop Me Now", a musical number which is normally interrupted by the Khashoggi character. This unique performance is acknowledged by Killer Queen's dialogue: "No, you didn't let me finish, you never let me finish. For six long years, night after night, week after week, year after year. Well, tonight, I'm going to finish", to which Khashoggi replied: "It's not in the script!" Killer Queen proceeded to yell, "Screw the script!" before continuing the song. Additionally, May joined Killer Queen and the dancers on stage for the performance. After the encore, Elton made a thank you speech, after which the entire cast performed "The Show Must Go On", accompanied by May on guitar.

The seventh anniversary of the London show was celebrated on Monday 18 May 2009. The show contained a special appearance from Brian May and Ben Elton who emerged together in a cloud of smoke during the encore rendition of "Bohemian Rhapsody" with May playing guitar. As with the year before, Elton gave a thank you speech and the entire cast performed "The Show Must Go On", accompanied by May on guitar.

On Saturday 12 September 2009 at the early matinee performance Brian May again emerged in a cloud of smoke playing the guitar in "Bohemian Rhapsody". The reason for this appearance was not clear. He did the same again at the matinee on Saturday 14 November 2009.

On Sunday 31 January 2010 in The O2 Dublin, Brian May once again played "Bohemian Rhapsody" with the company during the finale of both the matinee and evening shows to celebrate the end of their year-long tour.

On Saturday 5 September 2010, May also appeared though a cloud of smoke, again to play "Bohemian Rhapsody". This was due to the annual cast change, as well as a celebration of what would have been Freddie Mercury's 64th birthday, and afterwards Brian gave a farewell speech to the cast who were leaving.

On Saturday 5 October 2013, May appeared through the cloud of smoke to play "Bohemian Rhapsody" once more. This was because it was cast change and some of the cast were leaving. May appeared to be very emotional when he was giving his speech.

The 20th anniversary UK tour, also directed by Ben Elton, was choreographed and staged by Jacob Fearey. This version opened at the King's Theatre with the full cast onstage for "Innuendo". The script is the same as the School Cast's version, but with fewer elements of the original. "Play the Game" is cut, and the chorus is backstage for most of the numbers. "Don't Stop Me Now" is left in its entirety, without Khashoggi interrupting Killer Queen. For the first time in the show's history, "The Show Must Go On" has been added to the production closing Act 1.

In the new West End version, in Act 2, "Love of My Life" is only played as a brief instrumental. Some of the elements of the 20th anniversary tour production remain.

== Shows with Queen ==
Queen guitarist Brian May and drummer Roger Taylor often perform at premieres and special events. Bassist John Deacon left the band in 1997 after frontman Freddie Mercury's death, and has not performed with May or Taylor since.

When Bohemian Rhapsody is performed with May and/or Taylor, May comes up from a trap in the stage with a lot of smoke. (Only at the Dominion Theatre. Elsewhere he walks from the Wembley gate in the back, to the front of stage.) He performs the solo immediately before the opera section. Then the opera section begins, and he walks off stage. During the rock section Taylor comes up on the Heartbreak Hotel platform and May runs back on stage. (Only at the Dominion Theatre. Elsewhere Taylor's drum kit is pushed by stage crew and May runs on stage.) They perform the rock section with the cast and the ending section. They end the song before the stage goes into blackout.

Date	City	Venue	Member(s)	Performance	Notes
2002
18 May	London	BBC Television Centre	May & Taylor	(1) "Somebody to Love" (2) "Hammer to Fall" (3) "We Will Rock You" (4) "We Are the Champions"	Parkinson
3 June	London	Buckingham Palace	May & Taylor	(1) "Bohemian Rhapsody"	Party at the Palace
12 November	London	Dominion Theatre	May	(1) "Bohemian Rhapsody"	
16 November	London	BBC Television Centre	May & Taylor	(1) "Bohemian Rhapsody"	Children in Need

=== 2003 ===
Date	City	Venue	Member(s)	Performance	Notes
2003
20 September	London	Dominion Theatre	May	(1) "Bohemian Rhapsody"	Matinee and Evening performances
27 September	London	Dominion Theatre	May	(1) "Bohemian Rhapsody"	Evening performance
20 October	London	Dominion Theatre	May	(1) "Bohemian Rhapsody"	
27 October	London	Dominion Theatre	May	(1) "Bohemian Rhapsody"	
29 October	London	Dominion Theatre	May	(1) "Bohemian Rhapsody"	Evening performance
30 October	London	Dominion Theatre	May	(1) "Bohemian Rhapsody"	Evening performance

=== 2004 ===
Date	City	Venue	Member(s)	Performance	Notes
2004
2 January	Madrid	Teatro Calderón	May	(1) "Bohemian Rhapsody"	
27 January	Madrid	Teatro Calderón	May	(1) "Bohemian Rhapsody" (2) "Tie Your Mother Down"	Madrid's 100th We Will Rock You performance.
31 January	London	Dominion Theatre	May	(1) "Bohemian Rhapsody" (2) "We Are the Champions" (Evening only)	Matinee and Evening performances.
5 April	London	Dominion Theatre	May	(1) "Bohemian Rhapsody" (2) "We Are the Champions"	
3 May	Madrid	Teatro Calderón	May	(1) "Bohemian Rhapsody"	Press launch for the cast album.
11 May	London	Dominion Theatre	May	(1) "Bohemian Rhapsody" (2) "We Are the Champions"	BBC Sport Relief Charity special.
30 May	Madrid	Teatro Calderón	May	(1) "Bohemian Rhapsody"	Final We Will Rock You performance.
11 December	Nuremberg	Television Studio	May & Taylor	(1) "We Will Rock You" (2) "We Are the Champions"	Wetten, dass..? Q+PR tour announcement.
18 December	Paris Hotel	Las Vegas	May	(1) "Bohemian Rhapsody" (2) "Brighton Rock" (3) "The Show Must Go On"	Matinee and Evening performances

=== 2005 ===
Date	City	Venue	Member(s)	Performance	Notes
2005
12 January	London	Dominion Theatre	May & Taylor	(1) "Bohemian Rhapsody" (2) "Tie Your Mother Down" (3) "The Show Must Go On"	1,000th West End performance.
17 August	London	Dominion Theatre	May & Taylor	They were presented a couple of awards on stage (Longest Running Live Show in the Dominion Theatre and Most Successful Albums Act in UK Chart History).	On 13 August We Will Rock You took over the no.1 position of the longest running show at the Dominion Theatre. Ben Elton also attended on the 17th to celebrate this event.

=== 2006 ===
Date	City	Venue	Member(s)	Performance	Notes
2006
28 January	London	Dominion Theatre	May	(1) "Bohemian Rhapsody"	Hannah Jane Fox's last show.
11 May	London	Dominion Theatre	May	(1) "Bohemian Rhapsody" (2) "The Show Must Go On"	4th anniversary.
5 September	London	Dominion Theatre	May & Taylor	(1) "Bohemian Rhapsody" (2) "Love of My Life" (3) "Say It's Not True" (4) "The Show Must Go On"	Marking Freddie Mercury's 60th birthday. McFly performed "Don't Stop Me Now".
7 October	London	Dominion Theatre	May	(1) "Bohemian Rhapsody"	Matinee and Evening performances. Originally West End's final show. May announced an extension.

=== 2007 ===
Date	City	Venue	Member(s)	Performance	Notes
2007
10 March	London	The London Studios	May & Taylor	(1) "Tie Your Mother Down"	Al Murray's Happy Hour
14 May	London	Dominion Theatre	May & Taylor	(1) "Bohemian Rhapsody" (2) "The Show Must Go On"	5th anniversary.
1 August	Toronto	Canon Theatre	May & Taylor	(1) "Bohemian Rhapsody" (2) "The Show Must Go On"	The Show Must Go On was performed with Canadian Idol Top 7 finalists.
29 September	London	Dominion Theatre	May	(1) "Bohemian Rhapsody"	Matinee and Evening performances.
29 December	London	Dominion Theatre	May	(1) "Bohemian Rhapsody"	Matinee and Evening performances.

=== 2008 ===
Date	City	Venue	Member(s)	Performance	Notes
2008
24 January	Vienna	Raimund; Theater	May	(1) "Bohemian Rhapsody"	We Will Rock You Austria
21 May	London	Dominion Theatre	May	(1) "Don't Stop Me Now" (2) "Bohemian Rhapsody" (3) "The Show Must Go On"	Technical faults stopped May performing onstage during "Bohemian Rhapsody".

=== 2009 ===
Date	City	Venue	Member(s)	Performance	Notes
2009
10 January	London	Dominion Theatre	May	(1) "Bohemian Rhapsody"	Matinee and Evening performances.
25 March	Manchester	Palace; Theatre	May & Taylor	(1) "Bohemian Rhapsody"	We Will Rock You UK Tour
18 May	London	Dominion Theatre	May	(1) "Bohemian Rhapsody" (2) "The Show Must Go On"	7th anniversary.
11 June	Sunderland	Empire; Theatre	May	(1) "Bohemian Rhapsody"	
2 July	Birmingham	The; Hippodrome	May & Taylor	(1) "Bohemian Rhapsody"	May fell into Taylor's drum kit but recovered and finished the song.
12 September	London	Dominion Theatre	May	(1) "Bohemian Rhapsody" (2) "The Show Must Go On" (Evening only)	Matinee and Evening performances.
17 September	Bristol	The; Hippodrome	May	(1) "Bohemian Rhapsody"	Rufus Taylor played drums on "Bohemian Rhapsody".
9 November	Edinburgh	The; Playhouse	May & Taylor	(1) "Bohemian Rhapsody"	Edinburgh premiere.
12 November	Stuttgart	Apollo Theater	May	(1) "Bohemian Rhapsody" (2) "The Show Must Go On"	We Will Rock You Stuttgart 1st anniversary.
4 December	Milan	Allianz; Teatro	May	(1) "Bohemian Rhapsody"	

=== 2010 ===
Date	City	Venue	Member(s)	Performance	Notes
2010
15 January	Dublin	RTÉ Studios	May & Taylor	(1) "We Will Rock You" (2) "We Are the Champions"	The Late Late Show
31 January	Dublin	The O_{2}	May	(1) "Bohemian Rhapsody"	Matinee and Evening performances. Taylor attended but did not perform.
10 May	London	Dominion Theatre	May & Taylor	(1) "Bohemian Rhapsody"	8th anniversary.
3 September	Utrecht	Beatrix; Theatre	May	(1) "Bohemian Rhapsody"	
4 September	London	Dominion Theatre	May	(1) "Bohemian Rhapsody"	Matinee and Evening performances
12 September	Stockholm	Cirkus Arena Restaurang	May	(1) "Bohemian Rhapsody"	
21 October	Berlin	Theater des Westens	May	(1) "Bohemian Rhapsody"	

=== 2011 ===
Date	City	Venue	Member(s)	Performance	Notes
2011
20 January	Glasgow	King's Theatre	May	(1) "Bohemian Rhapsody"	Taylor attended the performance but did not play.
27 January	Oslo	Folketeatret	May	(1) "Bohemian Rhapsody"	Taylor attended the performance but did not play.
23 February	Copenhagen	Forum København (Copenhagen Forum)	Taylor	(1) "Bohemian Rhapsody"	May attended the performance but could not play due to a hand injury. This is currently the only performance with Taylor only, without May performing alongside him.
22 March	Cardiff	Millennium Centre	May	(1) "Bohemian Rhapsody"	Taylor attended the performance but did not play.
31 May	London	Dominion Theatre	May	(1) "Bohemian Rhapsody" (2) "The Show Must Go On"	9th anniversary
8 June	Aberdeen	His Majesty's Theatre	May	(1) "Bohemian Rhapsody"	
7 July	Birmingham	The; Hippodrome	May	(1) "Bohemian Rhapsody"	
20 August	London	Dominion Theatre	May	(1) "Bohemian Rhapsody"	Mazz Murray's final performance.
13 September	London	Dominion Theatre	May	(1) "We Will Rock You" (2) "We Are the Champions"	Children in Need: Pop Goes The Musical. With Mel C.
13 October	Bristol	The; Hippodrome	May	(1) "Bohemian Rhapsody"	
1 December	Edinburgh	The; Playhouse	May	(1) "Bohemian Rhapsody"	Gala performance in aid of the Mercury Phoenix Trust.

=== 2012 ===
Date	City	Venue	Member(s)	Performance	Notes
2012
15 April	London	Royal Opera House	May	(1) "Bohemian Rhapsody"	Olivier Awards
14 May	London	Dominion Theatre	May & Taylor	(1) "Bohemian Rhapsody" (2) "The Show Must Go On"	Technical fault prevented Taylor appearing onstage until the final minute of "The Show Must Go On".

=== 2013 ===
Date	City	Venue	Member(s)	Performance	Notes
2013
27 March	Nottingham	Capital FM; Arena	May	(1) "Bohemian Rhapsody"	Taylor attended but did not perform.
5 October	London	Dominion Theatre	May	(1) "Bohemian Rhapsody"	Cast change with Rachel John and Wayne Robinson leaving
16 October	Baltimore	France-Merrick P.A.C.	May	(1) "Bohemian Rhapsody"	Taylor attended but did not perform.

=== 2014 ===
Date	City	Venue	Member(s)	Performance	Notes
2014
31 May	London	Dominion Theatre	May & Taylor	(1) "Bohemian Rhapsody" (2) "The Show Must Go On"	Performed at both shows due to show closing at the Dominion Theatre

=== 2022 ===
Date	City	Venue	Member(s)	Performance	Notes
2022
8 February	Portsmouth	Kings Theatre	May	(1) "Bohemian Rhapsody"	Opening night gala for the 20th Anniversary UK Tour

=== 2023 ===
Date	City	Venue	Member(s)	Performance	Notes
2023
5 June	London	Coliseum	May	(1) "Bohemian Rhapsody"	Press night for the 2023 London revival
7 June	London	Coliseum	May	(1) "Bohemian Rhapsody"	Gala night for the 2023 London revival. Taylor appeared on stage with May but did not perform.
27 August	London	Coliseum	May	(1) “Bohemian Rhapsody”	100th performance in the London Coliseum (Closing performance of 2023 London revival)

=== 2025 ===
Date	City	Venue	Member(s)	Performance	Notes
2023
17 October	Stuttgart	Stage Palladium Theater	May	(1) "Bohemian Rhapsody"	Opening night for 2025/26 Stuttgart production

== Characters ==
Galileo Figaro – the central character of the musical; a dreamer who hears strange words in his head. He is eventually revealed to be a reincarnation of Freddie Mercury. The character's name is a reference to the lyrics in the Queen song "Bohemian Rhapsody".

Scaramouche – a sarcastic, cynical character and Galileo's love interest. In the finale she shows talent playing the electric guitar, and Galileo declares that she is a reincarnation of Brian May, only this time "he's a babe". The character's name is a reference to the lyrics in the Queen song "Bohemian Rhapsody".

Killer Queen – the villain of the musical, she rules over iPlanet with an iron fist. The character's name is a reference to the Queen song "Killer Queen".

Brit (alternatively Paris, Duff, Vic and J.B.) – Brit, short for Britney Spears, is the main male Bohemian rebel. In other productions, his name is either Paris (short for Paris Hilton), Duff (short for Hilary Duff), Vic (short for Victoria Beckham) or J.B. (short for Jeanette Biedermann).

Meat (alternatively Oz, Ozzy) – Meat, short for Meat Loaf, is the main female Bohemian. In some productions, the character is named Oz after Ozzy Osbourne.

Commander Khashoggi – Killer Queen's second-in-command, he is head of Globalsoft's police and carries out Killer Queen's dirty work. The character's name is a reference to the Queen song "Khashoggi's Ship" (which is about the real life Saudi arms dealer Adnan Khashoggi).

Pop (alternatively Polo, Bap, DJ, Buddy, Cliff or simply Rebel Leader) – an elderly librarian trying to figure out the "exact date the music died" (based on the 3 February 1959 plane crash that killed Buddy Holly, Ritchie Valens and the Big Bopper), who in some productions has a crush on Scaramouche, believed to be named after the creation of reality television talent shows (the example given varies depending on the production, but includes Popstars, Pop Idol, The X Factor, or the relevant regional variant). Probably named after Iggy Pop or simply a diminutive of "Grandfather". In the German production his full name is "Bap Niedecken". The name refers to the German band "Bap" (Cologne dialect for "Papa" = "Father") and the singer Wolfgang Niedecken. In the Brazilian production his name is "Toca Raul", a reference to Raul Seixas, and to a popular expression associated with him (Toca Raul = Play Raul) but that is also said during many rock concerts in Brazil, regardless of the singer.

Other Bohemians – the other Bohemians have constantly changing names following media trends. These are usually music-related, and have included Paul McCartney, Bruce Springsteen, Robbie Williams, Beyoncé, Madonna, Amy Winehouse, Bob the Builder, Boy George, Cliff Richard, Spice Girls, Elton John, Jackson Five, David Bowie, Prince, Burton Cummings, John Farnham, Charlotte Church, Crazy Frog, Eddie Cochran, Avril Lavigne, Shania Twain, Lily Allen, Kelly Osbourne and Clay Aiken, Cheeky Girls, Kurt Cobain and recently Michael Jackson, Whitney Houston, Gary Barlow, Lady Gaga, Justin Bieber, Katy Perry, Britney Spears, Jay Z and Frankie Valli.

== Music ==
As a jukebox musical, the show's music consists entirely of Queen material. The musical numbers of the original London production are as follows.

Act I

1. "Innuendo" – Freddie Mercury and ensemble
2. "Radio Ga Ga" – Ga Ga Kids
3. "I Want to Break Free" – Galileo
4. "I Want to Break Free" (reprise) – Scaramouche
5. "Somebody to Love" – Scaramouche and Teen Queens
6. "Killer Queen" – Killer Queen and Yuppies
7. "Play the Game" – Killer Queen and Yuppies
8. "Death on Two Legs"* (instrumental)
9. "Under Pressure" – Galileo and Scaramouche
10. "A Kind of Magic" – Killer Queen, Khashoggi and Yuppies
11. "I Want It All" – Brit and Meat
12. "Headlong" – Brit, Meat, Galileo and Scaramouche
13. "No-One but You (Only the Good Die Young)" – Meat and Bohemians
14. "Crazy Little Thing Called Love"* – Brit, Meat, Galileo, Scaramouche and Bohemians
15. "Ogre Battle" (instrumental)

Act II

1. "One Vision" / "Radio Ga Ga" (reprise) – Ga Ga Kids
2. "Who Wants to Live Forever" – Galileo and Scaramouche
3. "Flash" – Bohemians
4. "Seven Seas of Rhye" – Khashoggi and Bohemians
5. "Fat Bottomed Girls"* – Queen, Killer Queen and Sex Yuppies
6. "Don't Stop Me Now" – Killer Queen
7. "Another One Bites the Dust" – Killer Queen
8. "Hammer to Fall" – Galileo and Scaramouche
9. "These Are the Days of Our Lives" – Pop and Bohemians
10. "Bicycle Race"* – Bohemians
11. "Headlong" (reprise)* – Galileo, Scaramouche and Pop
12. "Love of My Life" – Bohemians
13. "Brighton Rock" solo* (instrumental)
14. "Tie Your Mother Down"* (instrumental)
15. "We Will Rock You" – Galileo and Bohemians
16. "We Are the Champions" – Galileo and ensemble

Encore

1. "We Will Rock You" (fast version) – Ensemble
2. "Bohemian Rhapsody" – Entire cast

Later in the London production, the "One Vision" sequence was changed to include Freddie Mercury's recorded vocals for the bridge. Previously, the bridge had been sung by the ensemble.

In the original London production, "Fat Bottomed Girls" was a short instrumental interlude prior to "Another One Bites the Dust". Subsequent international productions expanded the song into a full song and dance sequence. Due to the positive response, the change was transferred back to the London production.

On special occasions, "The Show Must Go On" is added to the encore.

For the single-act Las Vegas production, "Who Wants to Live Forever" is replaced by "You're My Best Friend". In the 2013-14 North American tour, "You're My Best Friend" is added after "I Want It All." "Who Wants to Live Forever" is reinstated, after "Flash" and "Seven Seas of Rhye."

For the Australasian tour, Canadian production and the 2013-14 North American tour, "Play the Game" is replaced by "Now I'm Here".

For the revamped Canadian production and the 2013-14 North American tour, "One Vision" is removed. "Flash" and "Seven Seas of Rhye" are repositioned to the start of Act Two.

For the 20th Anniversary UK tour, "Play the Game" and "Ogre Battle" were cut and replaced by "The Show Must Go On", which is positioned at the end of Act One. Additionally, "Don't Stop Me Now" is extended into the full length of the song for this production and is now a duet between Killer Queen and Scaramouche.

For the 2023 West End production, "The Show Must Go On" followed "Ogre Battle" at the end of Act One, with "Play the Game" still cut. "Don't Stop Me Now" was initially a duet between Killer Queen and Scaramouche, but later sung by Killer Queen on her own. "Radio Ga Ga" was not played as a reprise during "One Vision" in Act Two. "Hammer to Fall" was moved to after "Seven Seas of Rhye". "Bicycle Race" was extended, the lead vocal being performed by Pop.

=== Recordings ===
The cover of the original London cast album, featuring Tony Vincent.

A cast recording of the original London production was released in November 2002. Not all songs in the show were included in the album, the omitted tracks have been marked* in the above list. In August 2003, the London cast recording was given an Australian edition re-release, containing a bonus track of the original Australian Killer Queen, Annie Crummer, singing a studio version of "Another One Bites the Dust".

In 2004, Kerry Ellis, who was the original Meat in the London production, worked with Brian May to record an instrumental studio version of "No One But You (Only the Good Die Young)". This version is available through the official Queen website and in Ellis' limited-release CD single titled Wicked in Rock.

A Madrid cast recording was released in 2004. The recording includes a bonus second disc containing an extended Spanish-translated studio version of "No One But You" ("Solo Por Ti") sung by the original Meat, Eva María Cortés, and video clips of the original Madrid production.

A Cologne cast recording was released in 2005. It is the only We Will Rock You cast recording to contain "Fat Bottomed Girls".

In 2012, a 10th Anniversary Edition of the London Cast Recording was issued, comprising the original cast recording album, along with a CD containing bonus material.

=== Discography ===
Year	Release	Format	Peak chart positions								Certifications (sales thresholds)	Album
Year	Release	Format	UK	AUS	AUT	FRA	GER	IRE	NL	US	Certifications (sales thresholds)	Album
2002	We Will Rock You (The Original London Cast)	Album	—	—	—	—	—	—	—	—		
2003	We Will Rock You: Australasian Edition (The Original London Cast, Queen & Annie Crummer)	Album	—	—	—	—	—	—	—	—		
2003	"Another One Bites The Dust" (Queen + Annie Crummer)	Single	—	—	—	–	—	—	—	—		We Will Rock You: Australasian Edition
2004	We Will Rock You: Spanish Cast (The Madrid Cast)	Album	—	—	—	—	—	—	—	—		
2004	"Solo por Ti (No One But You)" (Queen + Eva Maria)	Single	—	—	—	—	–	—	—	—		We Will Rock You: Spanish Cast
2005	We Will Rock You: German Cast (The Köln Cast)	Album	—	—	—	—	—	—	—	—		
2011	We Will Rock You: Italian Cast (The Italian Cast)	Album	—	—	—	—	—	—	—	—		Only sold during the first Italian performances in 2011 and published by Barley Arts. Recorded during the 2009 tour in Milan.
2012	We Will Rock You 10th Anniversary (The Original London Cast)	Album	—	—	—	—	—	—	—	—		
2019	We Will Rock You: Hungarian Cast (The Hungarian Cast)	Album	—	—	—	—	—	—	—	—		Limited edition the Hungarian performances in 2019 and published by PS Produkció Ltd. Recorded during the 2018 performance in Budapest.

- Alana Bridgewater-recorded version of Fat Bottomed Girls on her debut album "Horizon".
- The 10th Anniversary album including the original 2002 album, along with a bonus CD with the following tracks:
  1. Another One Bites the Dust (2003 Remix) – Annie Crummer, Queen
  2. Sólo por Ti (No One But You) (In Spanish) (Short Version) – Eva Maria Cortes, Queen
  3. Sin Control (Headlong) (In Spanish) – The Spanish Cast
  4. Algo Loco Es el Amor (Crazy Little Thing Called Love) (In Spanish) – The Spanish Cast
  5. Killer Queen (In German) – The German Cast
  6. Play the Game (In German) – The German Cast
  7. Bohemian Rhapsody ('Party at the Palace' Live at Buckingham Palace, 2002) – The London Cast, Queen
  8. Radio Ga Ga ["Wetten, dass..?" German TV Live Performance, 2004] – The German Cast
  9. Somebody to Love ["Wetten, dass..?" German TV Live Performance, 2004] – The German Cast, Queen
  10. We Will Rock You ["Wetten, dass..?" German TV Live Performance, 2004] – The German Cast, Queen
  11. We Are the Champions ["Wetten, dass..?" German TV Live Performance, 2004] – The German Cast, Queen

== Awards and nominations ==
=== Original London production ===
Year	Award ceremony	Category	Nominee	Result
2003	Laurence Olivier Award	Best Performance in a Supporting Role in a Musical	Sharon D. Clarke	Nominated
2010	Laurence Olivier Award	Audience Award for Most Popular Show		Nominated
2011	Laurence Olivier Award	Audience Award for Most Popular Show		Won

=== Australia ===
Year	Award ceremony	Category	Nominee	Result
2004	Helpmann Award	Best Musical		Nominated
2004	Helpmann Award	Best Male Actor in a Musical	Michael Falzon	Nominated
2004	Helpmann Award	Best Female Actor in a Musical	Kate Hoolihan	Won
2004	Helpmann Award	Best Male Actor in a Supporting Role in a Musical	Robert Grubb	Won
2004	Helpmann Award	Best Female Actor in a Supporting Role in a Musical	Amanda Harrison	Won
2004	Helpmann Award	Best Direction of a Musical	Ben Elton	Nominated
2004	Helpmann Award	Best Choreography in a Musical	Arlene Phillips	Nominated
2004	Helpmann Award	Best Music Direction	Mike Dixon, Brian May and Roger Taylor	Won
2004	Helpmann Award	Best Sound Design	Bobby Aitken	Won

=== South Africa ===
Year	Award ceremony	Category	Nominee	Result
2006	Naledi Theatre Awards	Best Male Performance in a Musical	Neels Calsen	Nominated
2006	Naledi Theatre Awards	Best Female Performance in a Musical	Helen Burger	Nominated
2006	Naledi Theatre Awards	Best Comedy Performance (Male) – Play, Musical or Revue	Malcolm Terrey	Nominated
2006	Naledi Theatre Awards	Best Musical Director / Score / Arrangement	Bryan Schimmel	Nominated
2006	Naledi Theatre Awards	Best Theatre Sound Design	Mark Malherbe	Won

=== Toronto ===
Year	Award ceremony	Category	Nominee	Result
2007	Dora Mavor Moore Award	Outstanding Production of a Musical		Won
2007	Dora Mavor Moore Award	Outstanding Performance by a Male in a Principal Role – Musical	Yvan Pedneault	Nominated
2007	Dora Mavor Moore Award	Outstanding Performance by a Female in a Principal Role – Musical	Erica Peck	Nominated
2007	Dora Mavor Moore Award	Outstanding Direction of a Musical	Ben Elton	Nominated
2007	Dora Mavor Moore Award	Outstanding Choreography in a Play or Musical	Arlene Phillips	Nominated
2007	Dora Mavor Moore Award	Outstanding Musical Direction	Rick Fox	Nominated
2007	Dora Mavor Moore Award	Outstanding Costume Design	Tim Goodchild	Nominated
2007	Dora Mavor Moore Award	Outstanding Sound Design/Composition	Bobby Aitken	Nominated

== See also ==
- Rock of Ages
