= Erica Peck =

Canadian stage actress

- Born: 1986 (age 39–40); London, Ontario, Canada
- Education: Sheridan College
- Occupations: Actress, singer, entrepreneur
- Years active: 2007–present

Erica Peck is a Canadian actress, singer, and entrepreneur. In 2007, she originated the role of Scaramouche in the Canadian premiere production of We Will Rock You at the Canon Theatre. Peck also appeared in the Canadian premiere production of Kinky Boots, and in the North American tours of We Will Rock You and Kinky Boots.

She has appeared in several musical theatre productions across Canada, mostly in Ontario. Peck has appeared in 5 productions with Stratford Festival, including You're a Good Man, Charlie Brown, The Rocky Horror Show, and Rent.

== Early life and education ==
Peck was born in London, Ontario, but grew up in Mississauga where she attended Cawthra Park Secondary School. She attended the musical theatre program at Sheridan College, but did not graduate, as she left to star in the Canadian production of We Will Rock You with Mirvish Productions.

== Career ==
=== Theatre ===
Peck made her professional stage debut when she starred as Scaramouche in the original Canadian production of We Will Rock You. The musical played at the Canon Theatre in Toronto between March 2007, and June 2009. After this, Peck played Mary McGuire in the original Canadian production of The Boys in the Photograph, a musical by Andrew Lloyd Webber, which played at the Royal Alexandra Theatre.

She made her Stratford Festival debut in 2012, when she played Lucy in a production of You're a Good Man, Charlie Brown.

In 2013, Peck joined the North American tour of We Will Rock You, where she played the dual role of Meat/Oz.

Peck was cast in the Canadian premiere production of Kinky Boots. She was a member of the ensemble and an understudy for Lauren and Nicola in the musical, which played at the Royal Alexandra Theatre between May 2015 and June 2016. She later joined the first national tour of Kinky Boots.

In 2018, Peck played Magenta in The Rocky Horror Show at the Stratford Festival. The show was extended three times before eventually closing on December 2, 2018, which made it the longest running show in Stratford's history.

In 2023, Peck played Maureen Johnson in a production of Rent at the Stratford Festival.

In 2024, Peck began playing Molly Brown in the original Canadian production of Titanique. The musical premiered at the Segal Centre in Montreal, where it is playing between October 27 and November 24, 2024. It will then transfer to the CAA Theatre, where it will play between December 5, 2024 and January 12, 2025.

=== Business ===
Peck is the founder and owner of "WILDTHINGVINTAGE", a vintage clothing company that operates on Etsy and at various markets and festivals in Toronto. Her clothing appeared in the movie Can You Ever Forgive Me?. Her other notable clients include Marc Jacobs, Frances Bean Cobain, and Feist.

== Theatre credits ==
| Year | Production | Role | Theatre | Category | Ref. |
|---|---|---|---|---|---|
| 2007–2009 | We Will Rock You | Scaramouche | Canon Theatre | Mirvish Productions | |
| 2009 | The Boys in the Photograph | Mary McGuire | Royal Alexandra Theatre | Mirvish Productions | |
| 2012 | You're a Good Man, Charlie Brown | Lucy | Avon Theatre | Stratford Festival | |
| 2012 | Wanderlust | Ensemble | Tom Patterson Theatre | Stratford Festival | |
| 2013–2014 | We Will Rock You | Meat/Oz | First National Tour | | |
| 2015–2016 | Kinky Boots | Ensemble, u/s Lauren, Nicola | Royal Alexandra Theatre | Mirvish Productions | |
| 2016 | Seussical | Bird Girl / Mrs. Mayor | Regional: Young People's Theatre | | |
| 2016–2017 | Kinky Boots | Ensemble, u/s Lauren | First National Tour | | |
| 2017 | Maddie's Karaoke Birthday Party | Casey | Toronto Fringe Festival | | |
| 2018 | The Rocky Horror Show | Magenta / Usherette | Avon Theatre | Stratford Festival | |
| 2023 | Rent | Maureen Johnson | Festival Theatre | Stratford Festival | |
| 2023 | A Wrinkle in Time | Aunt Beast | Avon Theatre | Stratford Festival | |
| 2024–2025 | Titanique | Molly Brown | Segal Centre for Performing Arts | Mirvish Productions | |
| 2024–2025 | Titanique | Molly Brown | CAA Theatre | Mirvish Productions | |

== Awards and nominations ==
| Year | Award | Category | Nominated work | Result | Ref. |
|---|---|---|---|---|---|
| 2007 | Dora Awards | Outstanding Female Performance in a Musical | We Will Rock You | Nominated | |
| 2023 | BroadwayWorld Awards | Best Supporting Performer In A Musical | Rent | Nominated | |
