= Hampton Court Palace Festival =

Annual music festival in London

Coordinates: 51.4035°N 0.3384°W

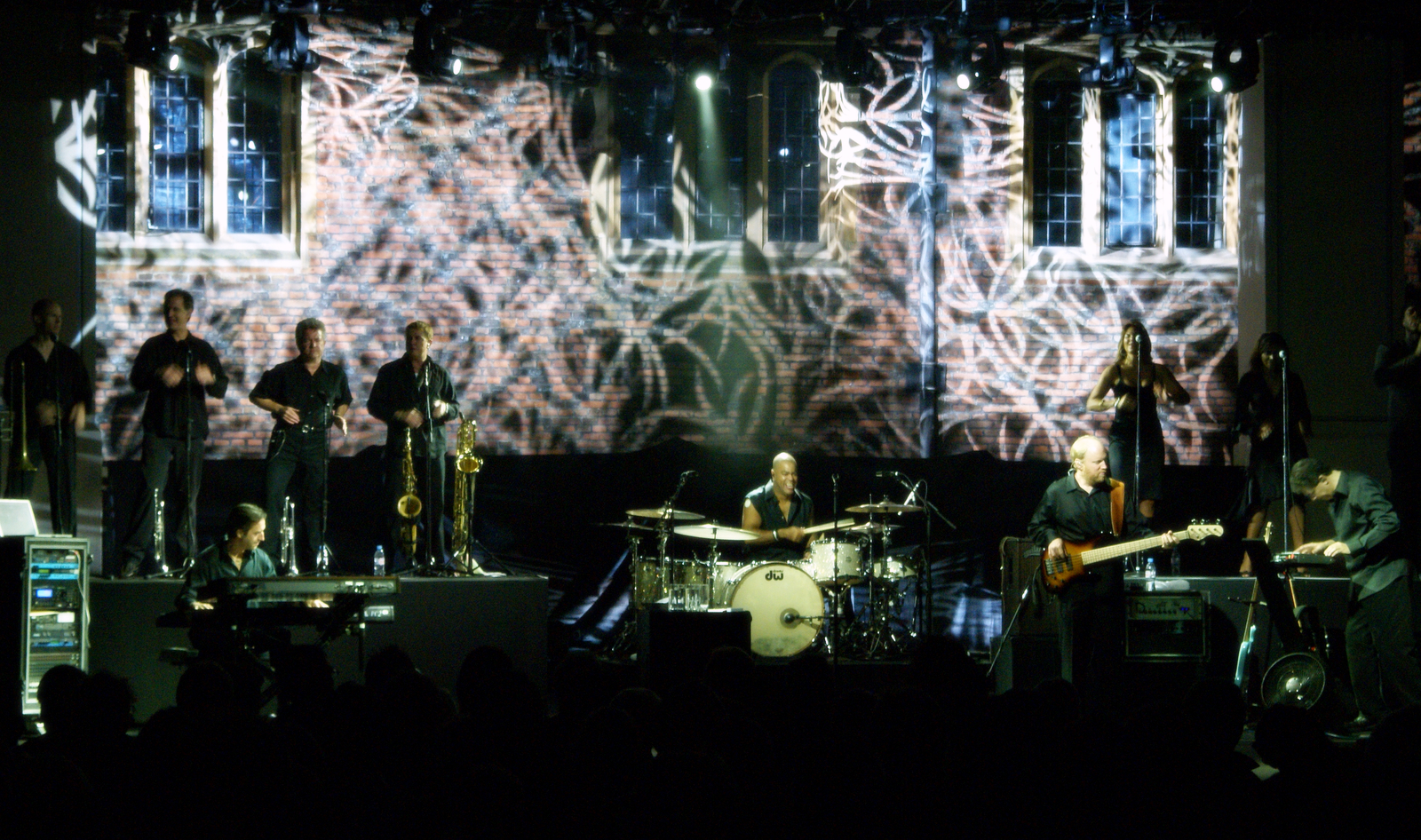
- Performers at the 2007 festival
- Genre: Pop, Classical, R&B, Mixed
- Dates: 6 Jun 2019 – 22 Jun 2019
- Venue: Hampton Court Palace
- Locations: Hampton Court Palace, UK
- Years active: 1993–present
- Website: hamptoncourtpalacefestival.com

The Hampton Court Palace Festival (also promoted as the Hampton Court Palace Music Festival) is an annual musical event at Hampton Court Palace in London.

Established in 1993, the festival is known for presenting artists across a range of music genres, such as Sir Elton John, Kylie Minogue, Eric Clapton, Tom Jones, Andrea Bocelli, Frankie Valli, Van Morrison, Jools Holland, Liza Minnelli, James Morrison Buena Vista Social Club, Dame Kiri Te Kanawa, José Carreras, Josh Groban and Keane. The concerts are held in the Base Court courtyard of the palace and continue a tradition of entertainment introduced by monarchs and nobility in the 1500s-1600s.

The event is held over 18 days in June, and is run in conjunction with Historic Royal Palaces. The venue supports an audience of 3,000, and the events culminate in a Festival Finale with a programme of classical favourites and a firework display on the East Front Gardens.

In August 2010 PWR Events Limited were awarded the contract to promote and manage the festival.
